= 2002 FIVB Men's Volleyball World Championship squads =

Below are listed all participating squads of the 2002 FIVB Men's Volleyball World Championship, held in Salta, Córdoba, Mar del Plata, Buenos Aires, Santa Fe and San Juan, Argentina from 28 September to 13 October 2002 .

== Squads ==
=== Argentina ===
#NR	NAME	BIRTH DATE (AGE)
1.	Marcos Milinkovic	22 December 1971 (aged 30)
2.	Jorge Elgueta	21 November 1969 (aged 32)
3.	Gustavo Porporatto	7 May 1981 (aged 21)
6.	Javier Weber	6 January 1966 (aged 36)
7.	Hugo Conte	14 April 1963 (aged 39)
8.	Hernán Ferraro	13 May 1968 (aged 34)
10.	Alejandro Spajic	7 May 1976 (aged 26)
11.	Jerónimo Bidegain	16 January 1977 (aged 25)
13.	Santiago Darraidou	24 November 1980 (aged 21)
15.	Leonardo Patti	6 July 1968 (aged 34)
17.	Pablo Meana	10 June 1975 (aged 27)
18.	Gastón Giani	26 April 1979 (aged 23)
Coach	Carlos Getzelevitch	

=== Australia ===
#NR	NAME	BIRTHDATE
1.	Daniel Howard	13 December 1976 (aged 25)
2.	Steven Keir	8 November 1979 (aged 22)
3.	Grant Sorenssen	27 March 1982 (aged 20)
4.	Benjamin Hardy	21 September 1974 (aged 28)
5.	Luke Campbell	8 November 1979 (aged 22)
7.	Matthew Young	17 July 1981 (aged 21)
9.	Andrew Earl	15 September 1982 (aged 20)
10.	Anthony Wardrop	10 June 1982 (aged 20)
13.	Davis Ferguson	13 March 1982 (aged 20)
14.	Zane Christensen	19 July 1985 (aged 17)
15.	Hidde Van Beest	20 July 1979 (aged 23)
18.	Brett Alderman	27 February 1979 (aged 23)
Coach	Jon Uriarte	15 October 1961 (aged 40)

=== Brazil ===
#NR	NAME	BIRTHDATE
3.	Giovane Gávio	7 September 1970 (aged 32)
5.	Henrique Randow	5 April 1978 (aged 24)
6.	Mauricio Lima	27 January 1968 (aged 34)
7.	Gilberto Godoy	23 December 1976 (aged 25)
9.	André Nascimento	4 March 1979 (aged 23)
10.	Sérgio Santos	15 October 1975 (aged 26)
11.	Anderson Rodrigues	21 May 1974 (aged 28)
12.	Nalbert Bitencourt	9 March 1974 (aged 28)
13.	Gustavo Endres	23 August 1975 (aged 27)
14.	Rodrigo Santana	17 April 1979 (aged 23)
17.	Ricardo García	19 November 1975 (aged 26)
18.	Dante Amaral	30 September 1980 (aged 21)
Coach	Bernardo Rezende	28 May 1959 (aged 43)

=== Bulgaria ===
#NR	NAME	BIRTHDATE
1.	Evgeni Ivanov	3 June 1974 (aged 28)
2.	Vesselin Dimtchev	21 December 1973 (aged 28)
4.	Yuli Vasilev	20 July 1975 (aged 27)
6.	Ivaylo Stefanov	19 July 1973 (aged 29)
7.	Danail Milushev	3 February 1984 (aged 18)
8.	Hristo Tsvetanov	29 March 1978 (aged 24)
11.	Vladimir Nikolov	3 October 1977 (aged 24)
12.	Nikolay Ivanov	14 June 1972 (aged 30)
13.	Vladimir Atapov	4 August 1981 (aged 21)
16.	Georgi Valov	6 May 1979 (aged 23)
17.	Plamen Konstantinov	14 June 1973 (aged 29)
18.	Daniel Peyev	11 May 1970 (aged 32)
Coach	Asen Galabinov	

=== Canada ===
#NR	NAME	BIRTHDATE
1.	Doug Bruce	7 May 1974 (aged 28)
2.	Sébastien Ruette	22 June 1977 (aged 25)
3.	Keith Sanheim	1 March 1970 (aged 32)
4.	Jason Dufault	24 October 1979 (aged 22)
8.	Scott Koskie	14 December 1971 (aged 30)
9.	Paul Duerden	22 October 1974 (aged 27)
11.	Steven Brinkman	12 January 1978 (aged 24)
12.	Christopher Wolfenden	22 June 1977 (aged 25)
13.	Daniel Lewis	3 April 1976 (aged 26)
14.	Murray Grapentine	24 August 1977 (aged 25)
15.	Jason Haldane	23 July 1971 (aged 31)
16.	Terence Martin	1 November 1975 (aged 26)
Coach	Stelio DeRocco	

=== PR China ===
#NR	NAME	BIRTHDATE
1.	Zhang Xiaodong	22 November 1982 (aged 19)
2.	Sui Shengsheng	30 May 1980 (aged 22)
3.	Zheng Liang	3 May 1970 (aged 32)
4.	Lu Fei	17 January 1982 (aged 20)
7.	Tang Miao	4 May 1982 (aged 20)
8.	Shi Hairong	27 March 1977 (aged 25)
9.	He Jiong	16 February 1977 (aged 25)
10.	Li Hang	3 February 1979 (aged 23)
12.	Shen Qiong	5 September 1981 (aged 21)
14.	Wang Haichuan	17 November 1979 (aged 22)
15.	Chu Hui	11 February 1981 (aged 21)
16.	Li Chun	1 April 1982 (aged 20)
Coach	Di Anhe	

=== Croatia ===
#NR	NAME	BIRTHDATE
2.	Ratko Periš	30 March 1976 (aged 26)
3.	Robert Celan	23 July 1975 (aged 27)
4.	Ante Jakovčević	9 January 1974 (aged 28)
5.	Dejan Laninović	18 April 1971 (aged 31)
6.	Stanislav Zimakijević	26 March 1976 (aged 26)
7.	Ivan Donald Marić	7 April 1974 (aged 28)
8.	Igor Šimunčić	12 December 1974 (aged 27)
9.	Igor Omrčen	26 September 1980 (aged 22)
11.	Darko Antunovic	26 November 1972 (aged 29)
12.	Tomislav Čošković	22 April 1979 (aged 23)
14.	Inoslav Krnić	14 April 1979 (aged 23)
17.	Vadim Evtoukovich	14 October 1975 (aged 26)
Coach	Igor Arbutina	27 July 1972 (aged 30)

=== Cuba ===
#NR	NAME	BIRTHDATE
1.	Yosleider Cala	22 October 1984 (aged 17)
3.	Yaniel Garay	20 November 1980 (aged 21)
4.	Yasser Portuondo	2 February 1983 (aged 19)
5.	Dariel García	13 June 1981 (aged 21)
7.	Ariel Gil Valdes	3 August 1983 (aged 19)
8.	Pavel Pimienta	3 February 1976 (aged 26)
9.	Maikel Salas	22 April 1981 (aged 21)
10.	Tomás Aldazabal	30 May 1976 (aged 26)
11.	Raidel Poey	20 February 1982 (aged 20)
15.	Javier González Panton	21 April 1983 (aged 19)
17.	Odelvis Dominic	6 May 1977 (aged 25)
18.	Javier Brito	5 September 1975 (aged 27)
Coach	Elizeo Ramos	

=== Czech Republic ===
#NR	NAME	BIRTHDATE
1.	Martin Lébl	12 April 1980 (aged 22)
2.	Jiří Popelka	11 May 1977 (aged 25)
5.	Jaroslav Škach	27 June 1975 (aged 27)
6.	Martin Kryštof	11 October 1982 (aged 19)
7.	Michal Rak	14 August 1979 (aged 23)
8.	Přemysl Kubala	16 December 1973 (aged 28)
9.	Ondřej Hudeček	9 May 1981 (aged 21)
10.	Jiří Novák	19 November 1974 (aged 27)
12.	Ivo Dubš	4 July 1974 (aged 28)
13.	Jiří Cerha	26 September 1979 (aged 23)
14.	Petr Zapletal	20 December 1977 (aged 24)
16.	Petr Pláteník	16 March 1981 (aged 21)
Coach	Julio Velasco	9 February 1952 (aged 50)

=== Egypt ===
#NR	NAME	BIRTHDATE
1.	Hamdy Awad	14 April 1972 (aged 30)
2.	Ashraf Abouel Hassan	17 May 1975 (aged 27)
3.	Mohamed El Mahdy	2 September 1978 (aged 24)
4.	Nehad Shehata	25 February 1975 (aged 27)
6.	Mahmoud Hassona	3 November 1972 (aged 29)
8.	Eslan Awad	5 August 1976 (aged 26)
9.	Ibrahim Rashwan	12 August 1978 (aged 24)
10.	Mahmoud Abdel Aziz	7 April 1975 (aged 27)
11.	Mohamed Moselhy	7 January 1972 (aged 30)
12.	Mohamed Bekheet	9 September 1976 (aged 26)
13.	Weal Said	6 January 1979 (aged 23)
14.	Ahmed Abd Elsatar	2 February 1980 (aged 22)
Coach	Abdelhamid Elwassimy	

=== France ===
#NR	NAME	BIRTHDATE
2.	Hubert Henno	6 October 1976 (aged 25)
3.	Dominique Daquin	10 November 1972 (aged 29)
7.	Stéphane Antiga	3 February 1976 (aged 26)
8.	Laurent Capet	5 May 1972 (aged 30)
9.	Frantz Granvorka	10 March 1976 (aged 26)
10.	Vincent Montméat	1 September 1977 (aged 25)
11.	Loïc De Kergret	20 August 1970 (aged 32)
12.	Luc Marquet	15 April 1970 (aged 32)
14.	Philippe Barca-Cysique	22 April 1977 (aged 25)
16.	Mathias Patin	25 April 1974 (aged 28)
17.	Olivier Kieffer	27 August 1979 (aged 23)
18.	Sébastien Frangolacci	31 March 1976 (aged 26)
0.	Rémi Gaillard	7 February 1975 (aged 27)
Coach	Philippe Blain	

=== Greece ===
#NR	NAME	BIRTHDATE
2.	Marios Giourdas	2 March 1973 (aged 29)
3.	Theodoros Chatziantoniou	16 March 1974 (aged 28)
4.	Chrysanthos Kyriazis	21 April 1972 (aged 30)
5.	Theodoros Bozidis	8 April 1973 (aged 29)
6.	Vasileios Kournetas	2 August 1976 (aged 26)
9.	Christos Dimitrakopoulos	1 July 1974 (aged 28)
10.	Antonios Tsakiropoulos	1 July 1969 (aged 33)
11.	Nikolaos Roumeliotis	12 October 1978 (aged 23)
12.	Georgios Ntrakovits	20 October 1968 (aged 33)
14.	Sotirios Pantaleon	21 June 1980 (aged 22)
15.	Ilias Lappas	20 July 1979 (aged 23)
18.	Zlatkov Bayev	31 May 1977 (aged 25)
Coach	Stelios Prosalikas	

=== Italy ===
#NR	NAME	BIRTHDATE
1.	Luigi Mastrangelo	17 August 1975 (aged 27)
3.	Pasquale Gravina	1 May 1970 (aged 32)
4.	Ferdinando De Giorgi	10 October 1961 (aged 40)
5.	Valerio Vermiglio	1 March 1976 (aged 26)
6.	Samuele Papi	20 May 1973 (aged 29)
7.	Andrea Sartoretti	19 June 1971 (aged 31)
9.	Cristian Casoli	27 January 1975 (aged 27)
11.	Hristo Zlatanov	21 April 1976 (aged 26)
12.	Mirko Corsano	28 October 1973 (aged 28)
13.	Andrea Giani	22 April 1970 (aged 32)
14.	Alessandro Fei	29 November 1978 (aged 23)
16.	Luca Tencati	16 March 1979 (aged 23)
Coach	Andrea Anastasi	8 October 1960 (aged 41)

=== Japan ===
#NR	NAME	BIRTHDATE
3.	Nobuhiro Ito	4 November 1977 (aged 24)
4.	Nobuyoshi Hosokawa	17 May 1973 (aged 29)
5.	Hiroyuki Kai	17 July 1978 (aged 24)
7.	Makoto Yamaguchi	1 May 1976 (aged 26)
8.	Katsutoshi Tsumagari	2 November 1975 (aged 26)
9.	Hiroaki Kawaura	13 November 1975 (aged 26)
10.	Takeshi Kitajima	16 December 1982 (aged 19)
11.	Yoichi Kato	12 August 1976 (aged 26)
13.	Ryu Morishige	18 July 1980 (aged 22)
14.	Takahiro Yamamoto	12 July 1978 (aged 24)
15.	Atsushi Kobayashi	10 March 1974 (aged 28)
17.	Yuta Abe	8 August 1981 (aged 21)
Coach	Mikiyasu Tanaka	

=== Kazakhstan ===
#NR	NAME	BIRTHDATE
1.	Marat Imangaliyev	17 March 1980 (aged 22)
3.	Ildar Gafarov	2 April 1972 (aged 30)
4.	Antonios Vazhenin	6 February 1975 (aged 27)
5.	Denis Zhukov	9 April 1976 (aged 26)
7.	Roman Panenko	26 March 1977 (aged 25)
8.	Marat Adryshev	25 April 1972 (aged 30)
10.	Vladimir Derevyanko	21 January 1971 (aged 31)
11.	Bakhytzhan Baitureyev	24 December 1967 (aged 34)
12.	Dmitriy Gorbatkov	21 September 1981 (aged 21)
13.	Airat Shigapov	2 January 1976 (aged 26)
15.	Danil Semeyev	24 November 1971 (aged 30)
16.	Dmitriy Zavgorodniy	4 January 1982 (aged 20)
Coach	Alexander Zapevalov	

=== Netherlands ===
#NR	NAME	BIRTHDATE
1.	Jan van Gendt	18 July 1974 (aged 28)
2.	Nico Freriks	22 December 1981 (aged 20)
3.	Sander Olsthoorn	21 July 1974 (aged 28)
4.	Reinder Nummerdor	10 September 1976 (aged 26)
5.	Guido Görtzen	9 November 1970 (aged 31)
6.	Richard Schuil	2 May 1973 (aged 29)
12.	Jochem de Gruyter	18 April 1978 (aged 24)
13.	Joppe Paulides	13 April 1982 (aged 20)
14.	Robert Horstink	26 December 1981 (aged 20)
15.	Joram Maan	15 October 1981 (aged 20)
16.	Allan van de Loo	10 January 1975 (aged 27)
18.	Dennis van der Veen	19 February 1982 (aged 20)
Coach	Bert Goedkoop	

=== Poland ===
#NR	NAME	BIRTHDATE
3.	Piotr Gruszka	8 March 1977 (aged 25)
4.	Marcin Nowak	17 October 1975 (aged 26)
6.	Dawid Murek	24 July 1977 (aged 25)
7.	Grzegorz Wagner	13 December 1965 (aged 36)
8.	Rafał Musielak	22 August 1973 (aged 29)
9.	Wojciech Serafin	20 June 1978 (aged 24)
10.	Robert Prygiel	17 April 1976 (aged 26)
12.	Jarosław Stancelewski	11 May 1974 (aged 28)
13.	Sebastian Świderski	26 June 1977 (aged 25)
14.	Paweł Papke	13 February 1977 (aged 25)
15.	Piotr Lipiński	4 January 1979 (aged 23)
16.	Arkadiusz Gołaś	10 May 1981 (aged 21)
Coach	Waldemar Wspaniały	2 October 1946 (aged 55)

=== Portugal ===
#NR	NAME	BIRTHDATE
1.	Roberto Reis	2 March 1980 (aged 22)
2.	Carlos Teixeira	11 March 1976 (aged 26)
3.	Nuno Pinheiro	31 December 1984 (aged 17)
5.	Fábio Milhazes	15 March 1982 (aged 20)
6.	Manuel Fernando Silva	28 December 1973 (aged 28)
8.	Hugo Gaspar	2 September 1982 (aged 20)
9.	Adriano Filipe Paço	28 January 1976 (aged 26)
11.	Ubirajara Pereira	25 August 1970 (aged 32)
12.	João José	7 June 1978 (aged 24)
14.	Flavio Cruz	28 August 1982 (aged 20)
15.	Jorge Alves	27 February 1978 (aged 24)
18.	Eurico Peixoto	13 May 1981 (aged 21)
Coach	Juan Diaz	

=== Russia ===
#NR	NAME	BIRTHDATE
2.	Vadim Khamuttskikh	26 November 1969 (aged 32)
4.	Ruslan Olikhver	11 April 1969 (aged 33)
5.	Pavel Abramov	23 April 1979 (aged 23)
8.	Evgeni Mitkov	23 March 1972 (aged 30)
9.	Sergey Tetyukhin	23 September 1975 (aged 27)
10.	Roman Yakovlev	13 August 1976 (aged 26)
11.	Konstantin Ushakov	24 March 1970 (aged 32)
14.	Taras Khtey	22 May 1982 (aged 20)
13.	Andrey Egorchev	8 February 1978 (aged 24)
14.	Aleksandr Kosarev	30 September 1977 (aged 24)
15.	Aleksandr Gerasimov	22 January 1975 (aged 27)
18.	Aleksey Kuleshov	24 February 1979 (aged 23)
Coach	Guennadi Chipouline	

=== Spain ===
#NR	NAME	BIRTHDATE
1.	Rafael Pascual	16 March 1970 (aged 32)
4.	Alfonso Flores	24 August 1975 (aged 27)
5.	Luis Pedro Suela	7 July 1976 (aged 26)
6.	Juan Carlos Vega	15 September 1975 (aged 27)
8.	Gustavo Saucedo	5 January 1978 (aged 24)
9.	Alexis Valido	9 March 1976 (aged 26)
10.	Cosme Prenafeta	9 December 1971 (aged 30)
11.	Carlos Carreño	19 April 1973 (aged 29)
12.	Guillermo Falasca	24 October 1977 (aged 24)
14.	José Luis Moltó	29 June 1975 (aged 27)
16.	Juan José Salvador	18 December 1975 (aged 26)
17.	Enrique de la Fuente	11 August 1975 (aged 27)
Coach	Francisco Hervás	7 March 1962 (aged 40)

=== Tunisia ===
#NR	NAME	BIRTHDATE
1.	Mohamed Trabelsi	15 September 1981 (aged 21)
3.	Mehdi Gara	1 March 1981 (aged 21)
5.	Samir Sellami	13 July 1977 (aged 25)
7.	Chaker Ghezal	14 January 1977 (aged 25)
9.	Khaled Belaïd	30 December 1973 (aged 28)
10.	Walid Ben Abbes	19 June 1980 (aged 22)
11.	Marouane Fehri	1 July 1979 (aged 23)
13.	Noureddine Hfaiedh	27 August 1973 (aged 29)
14.	Mehrez Berriri	13 April 1975 (aged 27)
15.	Ghazi Guidara	18 May 1974 (aged 28)
17.	Walid Ben Cheikh	21 January 1980 (aged 22)
18.	Hosni Karamosly	1 June 1980 (aged 22)
Coach	Antonio Giacobbe	

=== United States ===
#NR	NAME	BIRTHDATE
1.	Lloy Ball	17 February 1972 (aged 30)
2.	Christopher Seiffert	6 January 1978 (aged 24)
4.	David McKienzie	5 July 1979 (aged 23)
5.	Erik Sullivan	9 August 1972 (aged 30)
6.	Scott Bunker	27 April 1976 (aged 26)
8.	William Priddy	1 October 1977 (aged 24)
9.	Ryan Millar	22 January 1978 (aged 24)
10.	Riley Salmon	2 July 1976 (aged 26)
11.	Brook Billings	30 April 1980 (aged 22)
13.	Clayton Stanley	20 January 1978 (aged 24)
17.	Polster Poister	8 February 1979 (aged 23)
18.	Adam Naeve	9 February 1978 (aged 24)
Coach	Doug Beal	4 March 1947 (aged 55)

=== Venezuela ===
#NR	NAME	BIRTHDATE
2.	Carlos Tejada	29 September 1982 (aged 19)
3.	Andy Rojas	2 October 1977 (aged 24)
4.	Gustavo Valderrama	31 July 1977 (aged 25)
5.	Rodman Valera	20 April 1982 (aged 20)
6.	Carlos Luna	25 January 1981 (aged 21)
7.	Luis Díaz	20 August 1983 (aged 19)
8.	Andrés Manzanillo	1 August 1977 (aged 25)
9.	Héctor Guzmán	4 February 1978 (aged 24)
10.	Ronald Méndez	26 October 1982 (aged 19)
11.	Ernardo Gómez	30 July 1982 (aged 20)
14.	Thomas Ereu	25 October 1979 (aged 22)
18.	Fredy Cedeño	10 September 1981 (aged 21)
Coach	José David Suárez	b1953

=== Yugoslavia ===
#NR	NAME	BIRTHDATE
1.	Rajko Jokanović	27 November 1971 (aged 30)
2.	Goran Marić	2 November 1981 (aged 20)
4.	Bojan Janić	11 March 1982 (aged 20)
6.	Slobodan Boškan	18 August 1975 (aged 27)
7.	Đula Mešter	3 April 1972 (aged 30)
8.	Vasa Mijić	11 April 1973 (aged 29)
9.	Nikola Grbić	6 September 1973 (aged 29)
10.	Vladimir Grbić	14 December 1970 (aged 31)
12.	Andrija Gerić	24 January 1977 (aged 25)
13.	Goran Vujević	27 February 1973 (aged 29)
14.	Ivan Miljković	13 September 1979 (aged 23)
18.	Igor Vušurović	24 September 1974 (aged 28)
Coach	Veselin Vuković	
