= 2005 FIVB Volleyball World League squads =

This article show all participating team squads at the 2005 FIVB Volleyball World League, played by 12 countries from 27 May to 10 July 2005. The Final Round was held in Belgrade, Serbia and Montenegro.

== Argentina ==
The following is the roster in the 2005 FIVB Volleyball World League.

No.	Name	Date of birth	Height	Weight	Spike	Block	2005 club
1	Guillermo Garcia	21 September 1983	196 cm (6 ft 5 in)	78 kg (172 lb)	345 cm (136 in)	303 cm (119 in)	Origenes Bolivar, ARG
2	Gustavo Scholtis	16 December 1982	203 cm (6 ft 8 in)	70 kg (150 lb)	341 cm (134 in)	320 cm (130 in)	Alianza Cba. Deportes, Córdoba
3	Gustavo Porporatto	7 May 1981	197 cm (6 ft 6 in)	78 kg (172 lb)	353 cm (139 in)	323 cm (127 in)	Numancia, ESP
4	Alejandro Spajic	7 May 1976	204 cm (6 ft 8 in)	95 kg (209 lb)	360 cm (140 in)	340 cm (130 in)	Lokomotiv Belgorod, RUS
5	Gabriel Arroyo	3 March 1977	194 cm (6 ft 4 in)	90 kg (200 lb)	350 cm (140 in)	338 cm (133 in)	Vélez Sarsfield, ARG
6	Demian Gonzalez	21 February 1983	192 cm (6 ft 4 in)	74 kg (163 lb)	330 cm (130 in)	308 cm (121 in)	Club de Amigos, ARG
7	Ignacio Bernasconi	19 September 1985	195 cm (6 ft 5 in)	80 kg (180 lb)	330 cm (130 in)	310 cm (120 in)	Conarpesa, ARG
8	Hernán Ferraro	13 May 1968	170 cm (5 ft 7 in)	74 kg (163 lb)	300 cm (120 in)	300 cm (120 in)	Rosario Scholem Sonder, ARG
9	Lucas Chavez	3 April 1982	196 cm (6 ft 5 in)	78 kg (172 lb)	348 cm (137 in)	318 cm (125 in)	Alianza Cba. Deportes, ARG
10	Pablo Peralta	9 December 1979	204 cm (6 ft 8 in)	103 kg (227 lb)	350 cm (140 in)	330 cm (130 in)	Alianza Cba. Deportes, ARG
11	Jeronimo Bidegain	16 January 1977	200 cm (6 ft 7 in)	96 kg (212 lb)	352 cm (139 in)	335 cm (132 in)	Swiss Medical, ARG
12	Alexis Gonzalez	21 July 1981	182 cm (6 ft 0 in)	70 kg (150 lb)	321 cm (126 in)	300 cm (120 in)	Son Amar Las Palmas, ESP
13	Santiago Darraidou	24 November 1980	194 cm (6 ft 4 in)	95 kg (209 lb)	345 cm (136 in)	335 cm (132 in)	Fenherbace, TUR
14	Javier Filardi	7 February 1980	191 cm (6 ft 3 in)	90 kg (200 lb)	345 cm (136 in)	315 cm (124 in)	Alianza Cba. Deportes, ARG
15	Leonardo Patti	6 July 1978	187 cm (6 ft 2 in)	82 kg (181 lb)	340 cm (130 in)	320 cm (130 in)	Origenes Bolivar, ARG
16	Marcos Dominguez	24 August 1982	195 cm (6 ft 5 in)	86 kg (190 lb)	351 cm (138 in)	317 cm (125 in)	Club de Amigos, ARG
17	Maximo Torcello	31 March 1981	198 cm (6 ft 6 in)	88 kg (194 lb)	345 cm (136 in)	315 cm (124 in)	Conarpesa, ARG
18	Gaston Giani	26 April 1979	193 cm (6 ft 4 in)	83 kg (183 lb)	345 cm (136 in)	330 cm (130 in)	Arona Tenerife, ESP

== Brazil ==
The following is the roster in the 2005 FIVB Volleyball World League.

No.	Name	Date of birth	Height	Weight	Spike	Block	2005 club
1	Roberto Minuzzi	27 August 1981	200 cm (6 ft 7 in)	88 kg (194 lb)	344 cm (135 in)	329 cm (130 in)	Telemig Celular Minas, BRA
2	Marcelo Elgarten	9 November 1974	183 cm (6 ft 0 in)	78 kg (172 lb)	321 cm (126 in)	308 cm (121 in)	Unisul, BRA
3	Wesley Ribeiro	24 April 1979	190 cm (6 ft 3 in)	82 kg (181 lb)	335 cm (132 in)	319 cm (126 in)	Telemig Celular/Minas, BRA
4	André Heller	17 December 1975	199 cm (6 ft 6 in)	93 kg (205 lb)	339 cm (133 in)	321 cm (126 in)	Trentino, Italy
5	Henrique Randow	5 April 1978	201 cm (6 ft 7 in)	88 kg (194 lb)	337 cm (133 in)	320 cm (130 in)	Latina, Italy
6	Joao Paulo Tavares	30 March 1983	204 cm (6 ft 8 in)	93 kg (205 lb)	332 cm (131 in)	327 cm (129 in)	Unisul, BRA
7	Gilberto Godoy Filho	23 December 1976	192 cm (6 ft 4 in)	85 kg (187 lb)	325 cm (128 in)	312 cm (123 in)	Soc. Piemonte Volley SRL, ITA
8	Murilo Endres	3 May 1981	190 cm (6 ft 3 in)	76 kg (168 lb)	343 cm (135 in)	319 cm (126 in)	Wizard Suzano, BRA
9	André Nascimento	4 March 1979	195 cm (6 ft 5 in)	95 kg (209 lb)	340 cm (130 in)	320 cm (130 in)	Wizard Suzano, BRA
10	Sérgio Dutra Santos	15 October 1975	184 cm (6 ft 0 in)	78 kg (172 lb)	325 cm (128 in)	310 cm (120 in)	Coprasystel Piacenza, Italy
11	Anderson Rodrigues	21 May 1974	190 cm (6 ft 3 in)	95 kg (209 lb)	330 cm (130 in)	321 cm (126 in)	Coprasystel Piacenza, Italy
12	Samuel Fuchs	4 March 1984	200 cm (6 ft 7 in)	89 kg (196 lb)	342 cm (135 in)	316 cm (124 in)	Telemig Celular Minas, BRA
13	Gustavo Endres	23 August 1975	203 cm (6 ft 8 in)	98 kg (216 lb)	337 cm (133 in)	325 cm (128 in)	Volley Treviso, ITA
14	Rodrigo Santana	17 April 1979	205 cm (6 ft 9 in)	85 kg (187 lb)	350 cm (140 in)	328 cm (129 in)	Wizard Suzano, BRA
15	Renato Felizardo	4 July 1978	200 cm (6 ft 7 in)	89 kg (196 lb)	359 cm (141 in)	343 cm (135 in)	Callipo Volley SPA, ITA
16	Raphael Margarido	28 April 1983	185 cm (6 ft 1 in)	83 kg (183 lb)	310 cm (120 in)	303 cm (119 in)	Banespa, BRA
17	Ricardo Garcia	19 November 1975	191 cm (6 ft 3 in)	89 kg (196 lb)	337 cm (133 in)	320 cm (130 in)	Modena V. SPA, Italy
18	Dante Amaral	30 September 1980	201 cm (6 ft 7 in)	86 kg (190 lb)	345 cm (136 in)	327 cm (129 in)	Daytona Volley SRL, ITA

== Bulgaria ==
The following is the roster in the 2005 FIVB Volleyball World League.

No.	Name	Date of birth	Height	Weight	Spike	Block	2005 club
1	Evgeni Ivanov	3 June 1974	210 cm (6 ft 11 in)	98 kg (216 lb)	351 cm (138 in)	340 cm (130 in)	Tourcoing
2	Hristo Tsvetanov	29 March 1978	198 cm (6 ft 6 in)	85 kg (187 lb)	345 cm (136 in)	330 cm (130 in)	Stade Poitevin
3	Andrey Zhekov	12 March 1980	190 cm (6 ft 3 in)	82 kg (181 lb)	340 cm (130 in)	326 cm (128 in)	Levski Siconco
4	Boyan Yordanov	12 March 1983	197 cm (6 ft 6 in)	86 kg (190 lb)	358 cm (141 in)	335 cm (132 in)	Levski Siconco
5	Svetozar Ivanov	28 October 1977	208 cm (6 ft 10 in)	100 kg (220 lb)	347 cm (137 in)	336 cm (132 in)	Slavia
6	Matey Kaziyski	23 September 1984	202 cm (6 ft 8 in)	93 kg (205 lb)	360 cm (140 in)	335 cm (132 in)	Slavia
7	Krasimir Gaydarski	23 February 1983	204 cm (6 ft 8 in)	96 kg (212 lb)	350 cm (140 in)	330 cm (130 in)	Levski Siconco
8	Danail Mihaylov	1 July 1974	197 cm (6 ft 6 in)	87 kg (192 lb)	338 cm (133 in)	325 cm (128 in)	Club Deportivo Numancia
9	Nikolay Naydenov	22 April 1974	200 cm (6 ft 7 in)	90 kg (200 lb)	338 cm (133 in)	320 cm (130 in)	Lukoil Neftohimik
10	Smilen Mlyakov	17 June 1981	200 cm (6 ft 7 in)	98 kg (216 lb)	347 cm (137 in)	335 cm (132 in)	O.PE.Rethymnoy
11	Vladimir Nikolov	3 October 1977	200 cm (6 ft 7 in)	95 kg (209 lb)	345 cm (136 in)	325 cm (128 in)	Tours
12	Vladislav Stoyanov	17 May 1978	202 cm (6 ft 8 in)	96 kg (212 lb)	345 cm (136 in)	335 cm (132 in)	Slavia
13	Teodor Salparov	16 August 1982	185 cm (6 ft 1 in)	73 kg (161 lb)	320 cm (130 in)	305 cm (120 in)	Luch Moscow
14	Todor Aleksiev	21 April 1983	200 cm (6 ft 7 in)	96 kg (212 lb)	347 cm (137 in)	327 cm (129 in)	Levski Siconco
15	Kostadin Stoykov	7 December 1977	199 cm (6 ft 6 in)	85 kg (187 lb)	349 cm (137 in)	329 cm (130 in)	Levski Siconco
16	Danail Milushev	3 February 1984	200 cm (6 ft 7 in)	93 kg (205 lb)	358 cm (141 in)	335 cm (132 in)	Lukoil Neftohimik
17	Plamen Konstantinov	14 June 1973	202 cm (6 ft 8 in)	93 kg (205 lb)	347 cm (137 in)	330 cm (130 in)	Gabeca Pallavolo Montichiari
18	Ivan Kolev	2 January 1987	200 cm (6 ft 7 in)	92 kg (203 lb)	335 cm (132 in)	330 cm (130 in)	CSKA

== Cuba ==
The following is the roster in the 2005 FIVB Volleyball World League.

No.	Name	Date of birth	Height	Weight	Spike	Block	2005 club
1	Raidel Poey Romero	20 February 1982	198 cm (6 ft 6 in)	82 kg (181 lb)	360 cm (140 in)	340 cm (130 in)	Ciudad Habana, CUB
2	Tomás Aldazabal M.	30 May 1976	193 cm (6 ft 4 in)	83 kg (183 lb)	360 cm (140 in)	340 cm (130 in)	Ciudad Habana, CUB
3	Jorge Luis Sánchez Salgado	23 March 1985	197 cm (6 ft 6 in)	81 kg (179 lb)	345 cm (136 in)	313 cm (123 in)	La Habana, CUB
4	Yasser Portuondo	2 February 1983	196 cm (6 ft 5 in)	90 kg (200 lb)	351 cm (138 in)	319 cm (126 in)	Ciudad Habana, CUB
5	Osmany Juantorena Portuondo	12 August 1985	190 cm (6 ft 3 in)	78 kg (172 lb)	350 cm (140 in)	330 cm (130 in)	Santiago de Cuba, CUB
6	Javier González Panton	21 January 1983	193 cm (6 ft 4 in)	80 kg (180 lb)	358 cm (141 in)	330 cm (130 in)	Ciudad Habana, CUB
7	Osmany Camejo Durruty	18 February 1983	202 cm (6 ft 8 in)	90 kg (200 lb)	350 cm (140 in)	330 cm (130 in)	Ciudad Habana, CUB
8	Pavel Pimienta Allen	3 August 1976	204 cm (6 ft 8 in)	96 kg (212 lb)	365 cm (144 in)	340 cm (130 in)	Camaguey, CUB
9	Michael Sánchez Bozlueva	5 June 1986	206 cm (6 ft 9 in)	91 kg (201 lb)	358 cm (141 in)	328 cm (129 in)	Ciudad Habana, CUB
10	Dariel Garcia Cortina	13 June 1981	199 cm (6 ft 6 in)	91 kg (201 lb)	362 cm (143 in)	334 cm (131 in)	Ciudad Habana, CUB
11	Jesus Cruz López	15 February 1982	203 cm (6 ft 8 in)	100 kg (220 lb)	350 cm (140 in)	325 cm (128 in)	Ciudad Habana, CUB
12	Henry Bell Cisnero	27 July 1983	188 cm (6 ft 2 in)	84 kg (185 lb)	358 cm (141 in)	328 cm (129 in)	Santiago de Cuba, CUB
13	Roberlandy Simón Aties	11 June 1987	206 cm (6 ft 9 in)	91 kg (201 lb)	358 cm (141 in)	326 cm (128 in)	Ciudad Habana, CUB
14	Raydel Corrales Pouto	15 February 1982	201 cm (6 ft 7 in)	94 kg (207 lb)	355 cm (140 in)	325 cm (128 in)	Cienfuegos, CUB
15	Oriol Camejo Durruty	22 July 1986	207 cm (6 ft 9 in)	94 kg (207 lb)	354 cm (139 in)	326 cm (128 in)	Ciudad Habana, CUB
16	Sirianis Mendez	14 March 1983	193 cm (6 ft 4 in)	81 kg (179 lb)	350 cm (140 in)	320 cm (130 in)	Matanzas, CUB
17	Odelvis Dominico Speek	6 May 1977	205 cm (6 ft 9 in)	87 kg (192 lb)	360 cm (140 in)	356 cm (140 in)	Ciudad Habana, CUB
18	Yoandri Díaz Carmenate	4 January 1985	196 cm (6 ft 5 in)	89 kg (196 lb)	358 cm (141 in)	328 cm (129 in)	Ciudad Habana, CUB

== France ==
The following is the roster in the 2005 FIVB Volleyball World League.

No.	Name	Date of birth	Height	Weight	Spike	Block	2005 club
1	Loic Geiler	14 April 1984	194 cm (6 ft 4 in)	68 kg (150 lb)	330 cm (130 in)	304 cm (120 in)	MUC Volley-Ball, FRA
2	Hubert Henno	6 October 1976	188 cm (6 ft 2 in)	83 kg (183 lb)	330 cm (130 in)	310 cm (120 in)	Tours, FRA
3	Jean François Exiga	9 March 1982	176 cm (5 ft 9 in)	75 kg (165 lb)	0 cm (0 in)	0 cm (0 in)	Ajaccio
4	Gérald Hardy Dessources	9 February 1983	197 cm (6 ft 6 in)	90 kg (200 lb)	348 cm (137 in)	320 cm (130 in)	Tours, FRA
5	Junot Mistoco	16 August 1979	198 cm (6 ft 6 in)	105 kg (231 lb)	356 cm (140 in)	325 cm (128 in)	Arago Sete, FRA
6	Jean Charles Monneraye	25 August 1980	209 cm (6 ft 10 in)	103 kg (227 lb)	356 cm (140 in)	332 cm (131 in)	Tourcoing, FRA
7	Stéphane Antiga	3 February 1976	200 cm (6 ft 7 in)	94 kg (207 lb)	344 cm (135 in)	321 cm (126 in)	Palma, ITA
8	Ludovic Castard	18 January 1983	205 cm (6 ft 9 in)	75 kg (165 lb)	344 cm (135 in)	321 cm (126 in)	Arago de Sète, FRA
9	Frantz Granvorka	10 March 1976	195 cm (6 ft 5 in)	90 kg (200 lb)	364 cm (143 in)	327 cm (129 in)	Verona, ITA
10	Vincent Montmeat	1 September 1977	196 cm (6 ft 5 in)	88 kg (194 lb)	348 cm (137 in)	330 cm (130 in)	Poitiers, FRA
11	Loïc Lemarrec	1 March 1977	190 cm (6 ft 3 in)	82 kg (181 lb)	330 cm (130 in)	310 cm (120 in)	AS Cannes, FRA
12	Pierre Pujol	13 July 1984	182 cm (6 ft 0 in)	67 kg (148 lb)	325 cm (128 in)	300 cm (120 in)	Poitiers, FRA
13	Gabriel Zobo Lebay	8 January 1979	193 cm (6 ft 4 in)	100 kg (220 lb)	360 cm (140 in)	329 cm (130 in)	Montpellier UC, FRA
14	Philippe Barca-Cysique	22 April 1977	194 cm (6 ft 4 in)	88 kg (194 lb)	347 cm (137 in)	325 cm (128 in)	AS Cannes, FRA
15	Guillaume Samica	28 September 1981	196 cm (6 ft 5 in)	82 kg (181 lb)	343 cm (135 in)	318 cm (125 in)	Cuneo, ITA
16	Mathias Patin	25 April 1974	185 cm (6 ft 1 in)	73 kg (161 lb)	325 cm (128 in)	315 cm (124 in)	Paris, FRA
17	Oliver Kieffer	27 August 1979	200 cm (6 ft 7 in)	85 kg (187 lb)	355 cm (140 in)	335 cm (132 in)	Paris, FRA
18	Sebastien Frangolacci	31 March 1976	192 cm (6 ft 4 in)	88 kg (194 lb)	340 cm (130 in)	322 cm (127 in)	Paris, FRA

== Greece ==
The following is the roster in the 2005 FIVB Volleyball World League.

No.	Name	Date of birth	Height	Weight	Spike	Block	2005 club
1	Konstantinos Christofidelis	26 June 1977	195 cm (6 ft 5 in)	87 kg (192 lb)	341 cm (134 in)	320 cm (130 in)	Olympiakos S.F.P., Piraeus, Greece
2	Marios Giourdas	2 March 1973	202 cm (6 ft 8 in)	90 kg (200 lb)	356 cm (140 in)	341 cm (134 in)	G.S. IRAKLIS, Thessaloniki, Greece
3	Theodoros Chatziantoniou	16 March 1974	204 cm (6 ft 8 in)	95 kg (209 lb)	360 cm (140 in)	350 cm (140 in)	Olympiakos S.F.P., Piraeus, Greece
4	Chrysanthos Kyriazis	21 April 1972	195 cm (6 ft 5 in)	84 kg (185 lb)	338 cm (133 in)	322 cm (127 in)	E.A. PATRON, Patra, Greece
5	Sotirios Tsergas	3 July 1978	192 cm (6 ft 4 in)	84 kg (185 lb)	336 cm (132 in)	320 cm (130 in)	G.S. PANELLINIOS, Athens, Greece
6	Vasileios Kournetas	2 August 1976	191 cm (6 ft 3 in)	82 kg (181 lb)	336 cm (132 in)	320 cm (130 in)	Olympiakos S.F.P., Piraeus, Greece
7	Georgios Stefanou	12 January 1981	187 cm (6 ft 2 in)	82 kg (181 lb)	295 cm (116 in)	305 cm (120 in)	Panathinaikos, Athens, Greece
8	Efstathios Ntonas	2 February 1981	200 cm (6 ft 7 in)	96 kg (212 lb)	330 cm (130 in)	330 cm (130 in)	Panathinaikos, Athens, Greece
9	Christos Dimitrakopoulos	1 July 1974	188 cm (6 ft 2 in)	86 kg (190 lb)	325 cm (128 in)	325 cm (128 in)	Olympiakos S.F.P., Piraeus, Greece
10	Antonios Tsakiropoulos	1 July 1969	205 cm (6 ft 9 in)	93 kg (205 lb)	350 cm (140 in)	336 cm (132 in)	Olympiakos S.F.P., Piraeus, Greece
11	Nikolaos Roumeliotis	12 October 1978	201 cm (6 ft 7 in)	97 kg (214 lb)	343 cm (135 in)	320 cm (130 in)	E.A. PATRON, Patra, Greece
12	Nikolaos Smaragdis	12 February 1982	202 cm (6 ft 8 in)	85 kg (187 lb)	328 cm (129 in)	318 cm (125 in)	Panathinaikos, Athens, Greece
13	Andreas Andreadis	14 January 1982	205 cm (6 ft 9 in)	99 kg (218 lb)	260 cm (100 in)	315 cm (124 in)	Panathinaikos, Athens, Greece
14	Sotirios Pantaleon	21 June 1980	200 cm (6 ft 7 in)	77 kg (170 lb)	330 cm (130 in)	312 cm (123 in)	Panathinaikos, Athens, Greece
15	Ilias Lappas	20 July 1979	194 cm (6 ft 4 in)	92 kg (203 lb)	335 cm (132 in)	320 cm (130 in)	Panathinaikos, Athens, Greece
16	Antrei Kravarik	28 July 1971	204 cm (6 ft 8 in)	97 kg (214 lb)	360 cm (140 in)	350 cm (140 in)	G.S. IRAKLIS, Thessaloniki, Greece
17	Konstantinos Prousalis	6 October 1980	192 cm (6 ft 4 in)	83 kg (183 lb)	320 cm (130 in)	295 cm (116 in)	P.A.O.K., Thessaloniki, Greece
18	Tontor-Zlatko Baev	31 May 1977	200 cm (6 ft 7 in)	95 kg (209 lb)	340 cm (130 in)	333 cm (131 in)	G.S. IRAKLIS, Thessaloniki, Greece

== Italy ==
The following is the roster in the 2005 FIVB Volleyball World League.

No.	Name	Date of birth	Height	Weight	Spike	Block	2005 club
1	Luigi Mastrangelo	17 August 1975	202 cm (6 ft 8 in)	90 kg (200 lb)	368 cm (145 in)	336 cm (132 in)	Lube Banca Marche Macerata, Cu
2	Marco Meoni	25 May 1973	197 cm (6 ft 6 in)	86 kg (190 lb)	338 cm (133 in)	313 cm (123 in)	Unimade, Parma
3	Giacomo Sintini	16 January 1979	195 cm (6 ft 5 in)	82 kg (181 lb)	350 cm (140 in)	325 cm (128 in)	RPA, Perugia
4	Leonardo Morsut	23 September 1980	199 cm (6 ft 6 in)	93 kg (205 lb)	350 cm (140 in)	325 cm (128 in)	Edilbasso, Padova
5	Valerio Vermiglio	1 March 1976	190 cm (6 ft 3 in)	83 kg (183 lb)	342 cm (135 in)	320 cm (130 in)	Sisley, Treviso
6	Alessandro Farina	16 May 1976	182 cm (6 ft 0 in)	80 kg (180 lb)	342 cm (135 in)	310 cm (120 in)	Sisley, Treviso
7	Simone Rosalba	31 January 1976	197 cm (6 ft 6 in)	92 kg (203 lb)	345 cm (136 in)	316 cm (124 in)	Coprasystel, Piacenza
8	Alberto Cisolla	10 October 1977	197 cm (6 ft 6 in)	86 kg (190 lb)	367 cm (144 in)	345 cm (136 in)	Sisley, Treviso
9	Cristian Savani	22 February 1982	194 cm (6 ft 4 in)	83 kg (183 lb)	354 cm (139 in)	335 cm (132 in)	Bossini Montichiari, Montichia
10	Luca Tencati	16 March 1979	200 cm (6 ft 7 in)	97 kg (214 lb)	350 cm (140 in)	330 cm (130 in)	Sisley Treviso, Treviso
11	Ventzislav Simeonov	3 February 1977	199 cm (6 ft 6 in)	103 kg (227 lb)	356 cm (140 in)	318 cm (125 in)	Bossini Sangemini, Montichiari
12	Mirko Corsano	28 October 1973	190 cm (6 ft 3 in)	87 kg (192 lb)	342 cm (135 in)	303 cm (119 in)	Lube Banca Marche, Macerata
13	Hristo Zlatanov	21 April 1976	204 cm (6 ft 8 in)	103 kg (227 lb)	355 cm (140 in)	315 cm (124 in)	Coprasystel, Piacenza
14	Alessandro Fei	29 November 1978	204 cm (6 ft 8 in)	90 kg (200 lb)	352 cm (139 in)	321 cm (126 in)	Sisley, Treviso
15	Andrea Semenzato	12 September 1981	205 cm (6 ft 9 in)	92 kg (203 lb)	340 cm (130 in)	325 cm (128 in)	Sisley Treviso, ITA
16	Michal Lasko	11 March 1981	202 cm (6 ft 8 in)	100 kg (220 lb)	348 cm (137 in)	337 cm (133 in)	A.P.I. Pallavolo, Verona
17	Paolo Cozzi	26 May 1980	200 cm (6 ft 7 in)	86 kg (190 lb)	363 cm (143 in)	328 cm (129 in)	Kerakoll, Modena
18	Matej Cernic	13 September 1978	192 cm (6 ft 4 in)	80 kg (180 lb)	354 cm (139 in)	335 cm (132 in)	Kerakoll Modena, Modena

== Japan ==
The following is the roster in the 2005 FIVB Volleyball World League.

No.	Name	Date of birth	Height	Weight	Spike	Block	2005 club
1	Nobuharu Saito	29 September 1973	205 cm (6 ft 9 in)	97 kg (214 lb)	356 cm (140 in)	330 cm (130 in)	TORAY Arrows, Shizuoka, JPN
2	Marcos Sugiyama	16 November 1973	187 cm (6 ft 2 in)	88 kg (194 lb)	350 cm (140 in)	335 cm (132 in)	Sakai Blazers, Osaka, JPN
3	Hiroyoshi Hanano	24 July 1974	178 cm (5 ft 10 in)	78 kg (172 lb)	315 cm (124 in)	290 cm (110 in)	Suntory Sunbirds, Osaka, Japan
4	Kenji Onoue	12 May 1978	200 cm (6 ft 7 in)	85 kg (187 lb)	340 cm (130 in)	335 cm (132 in)	JT Thunders, Hiroshima, JPN
5	Hiroyuki Kai	17 July 1978	189 cm (6 ft 2 in)	89 kg (196 lb)	330 cm (130 in)	320 cm (130 in)	Sakai Blazers, Osaka, Japan
6	Ryuji Naohiro	1 October 1978	198 cm (6 ft 6 in)	86 kg (190 lb)	350 cm (140 in)	340 cm (130 in)	JT Thunders, Hiroshima, JPN
7	Taiji Yamamoto	6 January 1979	185 cm (6 ft 1 in)	83 kg (183 lb)	330 cm (130 in)	315 cm (124 in)	TORAY Arrows, Shizuoka, JPN
8	Masaji Ogino	8 January 1970	197 cm (6 ft 6 in)	97 kg (214 lb)	340 cm (130 in)	320 cm (130 in)	Suntory Sunbirds, Osaka, Japan
9	Daisuke Usami	29 March 1979	184 cm (6 ft 0 in)	83 kg (183 lb)	340 cm (130 in)	320 cm (130 in)	NEC Blue Rockets, Tokyo, JPN
10	Osamu Tanabe	10 April 1979	181 cm (5 ft 11 in)	73 kg (161 lb)	323 cm (127 in)	293 cm (115 in)	TORAY Arrows, Shizuoka, JPN
11	Keisuke Imai	5 February 1980	197 cm (6 ft 6 in)	87 kg (192 lb)	352 cm (139 in)	340 cm (130 in)	Panasonic Panthers, Osaka, JPN
12	Kota Yamamura	20 October 1980	205 cm (6 ft 9 in)	90 kg (200 lb)	350 cm (140 in)	340 cm (130 in)	Suntory Sunbirds, Osaka, Japan
13	Rio Matsunaga	9 October 1981	190 cm (6 ft 3 in)	80 kg (180 lb)	345 cm (136 in)	315 cm (124 in)	Panasonic Panthers, Osaka, JPN
14	Ko Tanimura	15 August 1982	194 cm (6 ft 4 in)	82 kg (181 lb)	345 cm (136 in)	333 cm (131 in)	Panasonic Panthers (To be), JP
15	Yusuke Matsuta	31 October 1982	202 cm (6 ft 8 in)	87 kg (192 lb)	350 cm (140 in)	340 cm (130 in)	Tokai University, Kanagawa, JP
16	Takeshi Kitajima	16 December 1982	195 cm (6 ft 5 in)	85 kg (187 lb)	348 cm (137 in)	335 cm (132 in)	Sakai Blazers (To be), Osaka,
17	Yu Koshikawa	30 June 1984	190 cm (6 ft 3 in)	86 kg (190 lb)	345 cm (136 in)	325 cm (128 in)	Suntory Sunbirds, Osaka, Japan
18	Tatsuya Fukuzawa	1 July 1986	189 cm (6 ft 2 in)	78 kg (172 lb)	345 cm (136 in)	330 cm (130 in)	Chuo University (To be), Tokyo

== Poland ==
The following is the roster in the 2005 FIVB Volleyball World League.

No.	Name	Date of birth	Height	Weight	Spike	Block	2005 club
1	Michal Bakiewicz	22 March 1981	196 cm (6 ft 5 in)	79 kg (174 lb)	338 cm (133 in)	324 cm (128 in)	PZU AZS, Olsztyn, POL
2	Piotr Gacek	16 September 1978	185 cm (6 ft 1 in)	78 kg (172 lb)	325 cm (128 in)	305 cm (120 in)	Pamapol Domex AZS, Czestochowa
3	Arkadiusz Golas	10 May 1981	201 cm (6 ft 7 in)	82 kg (181 lb)	365 cm (144 in)	342 cm (135 in)	Edilbasso&Partners, Padova, IT
4	Piotr Gruszka	8 March 1977	206 cm (6 ft 9 in)	102 kg (225 lb)	352 cm (139 in)	325 cm (128 in)	Skra, Belchatow, POL
5	Wojciech Grzyb	4 January 1981	205 cm (6 ft 9 in)	104 kg (229 lb)	358 cm (141 in)	334 cm (131 in)	AZS Olsztyn, POL
6	Krzysztof Ignaczak	15 May 1972	188 cm (6 ft 2 in)	86 kg (190 lb)	330 cm (130 in)	315 cm (124 in)	Skra, Belchatow, POL
7	Wojciech Jurkiewicz	21 June 1977	205 cm (6 ft 9 in)	95 kg (209 lb)	350 cm (140 in)	330 cm (130 in)	Pamapol Domex AZS, Czestochowa
8	Lukasz Kadziewicz	20 September 1980	206 cm (6 ft 9 in)	84 kg (185 lb)	350 cm (140 in)	328 cm (129 in)	Gazprom, Surgut, RUS
9	Dawid Murek	24 July 1977	196 cm (6 ft 5 in)	94 kg (207 lb)	341 cm (134 in)	325 cm (128 in)	Panathinaikos, Athens, GREECE
10	Pawel Papke	13 February 1977	196 cm (6 ft 5 in)	100 kg (220 lb)	347 cm (137 in)	325 cm (128 in)	PZU AZS, Olsztyn, POL
11	Daniel Plinski	10 December 1978	205 cm (6 ft 9 in)	95 kg (209 lb)	348 cm (137 in)	330 cm (130 in)	Jastrzebski Wegiel, Jastrzebie
12	Andrzej Stelmach	15 August 1972	200 cm (6 ft 7 in)	98 kg (216 lb)	330 cm (130 in)	220 cm (87 in)	Skra, Belchatow, POL
13	Sebastian Swiderski	26 June 1977	193 cm (6 ft 4 in)	88 kg (194 lb)	354 cm (139 in)	325 cm (128 in)	RPA Volley, Perugia ITA
14	Grzegorz Szymanski	12 July 1978	202 cm (6 ft 8 in)	92 kg (203 lb)	345 cm (136 in)	328 cm (129 in)	Pamapol Domex AZS, Czestochowa
15	Michal Winiarski	28 September 1983	197 cm (6 ft 6 in)	82 kg (181 lb)	348 cm (137 in)	325 cm (128 in)	Pamapol AZS, Czestochowa, POL
16	Mariusz Wlazly	4 August 1983	195 cm (6 ft 5 in)	75 kg (165 lb)	362 cm (143 in)	343 cm (135 in)	Skra, Belchatow, POL
17	Pawel Woicki	29 June 1983	182 cm (6 ft 0 in)	75 kg (165 lb)	315 cm (124 in)	300 cm (120 in)	Pamapol Domex AZS, Czestochowa
18	Pawel Zagumny	18 October 1977	200 cm (6 ft 7 in)	88 kg (194 lb)	336 cm (132 in)	317 cm (125 in)	PZU AZS, Olsztyn, POL

== Portugal ==
The following is the roster in the 2005 FIVB Volleyball World League.

No.	Name	Date of birth	Height	Weight	Spike	Block	2005 club
1	António Miguel Costa	2 October 1984	191 cm (6 ft 3 in)	82 kg (181 lb)	337 cm (133 in)	328 cm (129 in)	SC Espinho, Espinho, POR
2	Carlos Teixeira	11 March 1976	185 cm (6 ft 1 in)	76 kg (168 lb)	311 cm (122 in)	293 cm (115 in)	SL Benfica, Lisboa, POR
3	Nuno Pinheiro	31 December 1984	193 cm (6 ft 4 in)	89 kg (196 lb)	327 cm (129 in)	315 cm (124 in)	Prisma Taranto, Italy, ITA
4	João Malveiro	8 December 1979	200 cm (6 ft 7 in)	90 kg (200 lb)	341 cm (134 in)	337 cm (133 in)	AAA, Ponta Delgada, POR
5	Fábio Milhazes	15 March 1982	200 cm (6 ft 7 in)	80 kg (180 lb)	341 cm (134 in)	335 cm (132 in)	G.C. Vilacondense, V.Conde, PO
6	Nuno Soares	5 June 1987	195 cm (6 ft 5 in)	85 kg (187 lb)	320 cm (130 in)	305 cm (120 in)	Castelo Maia GC, Maia, POR
7	Alexandre Castro	3 March 1980	191 cm (6 ft 3 in)	95 kg (209 lb)	327 cm (129 in)	295 cm (116 in)	Leixoes S.C., Matosinhos, POR
8	Hugo Gaspar	2 September 1982	200 cm (6 ft 7 in)	79 kg (174 lb)	354 cm (139 in)	343 cm (135 in)	Sysley Treviso, Italy, ITA
9	Carlos Fidalgo	16 May 1987	199 cm (6 ft 6 in)	85 kg (187 lb)	343 cm (135 in)	337 cm (133 in)	SL Benfica, Lisboa, POR
10	Rui Santos	24 March 1984	201 cm (6 ft 7 in)	88 kg (194 lb)	339 cm (133 in)	334 cm (131 in)	Esmoriz G.C., Esmoriz, POR
11	Eden Sequeira	28 October 1980	198 cm (6 ft 6 in)	90 kg (200 lb)	350 cm (140 in)	343 cm (135 in)	Assoc. Acad. Coimbra, Coimbra,
12	João José	7 June 1978	195 cm (6 ft 5 in)	87 kg (192 lb)	352 cm (139 in)	345 cm (136 in)	VFB Friedrichshafen, Germany
13	André Lopes	12 September 1982	193 cm (6 ft 4 in)	84 kg (185 lb)	342 cm (135 in)	332 cm (131 in)	SL Benfica, Lisboa, POR
14	Flávio Cruz	28 August 1982	195 cm (6 ft 5 in)	85 kg (187 lb)	348 cm (137 in)	341 cm (134 in)	Allegrini Bergamo, Italy, ITA
15	Marco Ferreira	4 October 1987	200 cm (6 ft 7 in)	80 kg (180 lb)	332 cm (131 in)	327 cm (129 in)	SL Benfica, POR, Lisboa, POR
16	Valdir Sequeira	22 November 1981	194 cm (6 ft 4 in)	82 kg (181 lb)	351 cm (138 in)	344 cm (135 in)	A.A. Coimbra, Coimbra, POR
17	Hugo Ribeiro	15 November 1977	180 cm (5 ft 11 in)	80 kg (180 lb)	315 cm (124 in)	300 cm (120 in)	Castelo Maia G.C., Castelo Mai
18	Eurico Peixoto	13 May 1981	192 cm (6 ft 4 in)	85 kg (187 lb)	332 cm (131 in)	326 cm (128 in)	Sudtirol Alto Adige Bolzano, IT

== Serbia and Montenegro ==
The following is the roster in the 2005 FIVB Volleyball World League.

No.	Name	Date of birth	Height	Weight	Spike	Block	2005 club
1	Vlado Petkovic	6 January 1983	198 cm (6 ft 6 in)	97 kg (214 lb)	325 cm (128 in)	318 cm (125 in)	Crvena Zvezda, Beograd (SCG)
2	Dejan Bojovic	3 April 1983	198 cm (6 ft 6 in)	86 kg (190 lb)	360 cm (140 in)	345 cm (136 in)	Crvena Zvezda, Beograd (SCG)
3	Goran Maric	2 November 1981	204 cm (6 ft 8 in)	87 kg (192 lb)	344 cm (135 in)	327 cm (129 in)	Sira, Ancona (ITA)
4	Bojan Janic	11 March 1982	198 cm (6 ft 6 in)	83 kg (183 lb)	345 cm (136 in)	322 cm (127 in)	Tanno Callipo, Vibo Valentia (
5	Aleksandar Mitrovic	24 September 1982	193 cm (6 ft 4 in)	93 kg (205 lb)	350 cm (140 in)	324 cm (128 in)	Icom Volley s.r.l., Latina (IT
6	Branko Roljic	28 September 1981	199 cm (6 ft 6 in)	95 kg (209 lb)	339 cm (133 in)	320 cm (130 in)	Vojvodina Novolin, Novi Sad (S
7	Dragan Stankovic	18 October 1985	205 cm (6 ft 9 in)	80 kg (180 lb)	343 cm (135 in)	333 cm (131 in)	Crvena Zvezda, Beograd (SCG)
8	Marko Samardzic	22 February 1983	190 cm (6 ft 3 in)	82 kg (181 lb)	326 cm (128 in)	310 cm (120 in)	Crvena Zvezda Beograd, SCG
9	Nikola Grbic	6 September 1973	194 cm (6 ft 4 in)	91 kg (201 lb)	346 cm (136 in)	320 cm (130 in)	Copra Volley s.r.l., Piacenza
10	Vladan Djordjevic	10 January 1983	194 cm (6 ft 4 in)	90 kg (200 lb)	332 cm (131 in)	318 cm (125 in)	Aon hotVolleys, Vienna (AUT)
11	Nikola Kovacevic	14 February 1983	193 cm (6 ft 4 in)	78 kg (172 lb)	350 cm (140 in)	340 cm (130 in)	Crvena Zvezda, Beograd (SCG)
12	Andrija Geric	24 January 1977	203 cm (6 ft 8 in)	101 kg (223 lb)	350 cm (140 in)	323 cm (127 in)	AS Volley Lube s.r.l., Macerat
13	Goran Vujevic	27 February 1973	192 cm (6 ft 4 in)	94 kg (207 lb)	339 cm (133 in)	315 cm (124 in)	Itas, Trentino (ITA)
14	Ivan Miljkovic	13 September 1979	206 cm (6 ft 9 in)	88 kg (194 lb)	354 cm (139 in)	333 cm (131 in)	AS Volley Lube s.r.l., Macerat
15	Ivan Ilic	19 December 1976	194 cm (6 ft 4 in)	85 kg (187 lb)	330 cm (130 in)	315 cm (124 in)	Buducnost Podgoricka banka, Po
16	Nikola Rosic	5 August 1984	192 cm (6 ft 4 in)	85 kg (187 lb)	328 cm (129 in)	315 cm (124 in)	Budvanska rivijera, Budva (SCG
17	Milan Markovic	20 January 1980	203 cm (6 ft 8 in)	101 kg (223 lb)	348 cm (137 in)	321 cm (126 in)	Arkas St John SK, Izmir (TUR)
18	Marko Zlatic	9 July 1979	203 cm (6 ft 8 in)	92 kg (203 lb)	340 cm (130 in)	316 cm (124 in)	Buducnost Podgoricka banka, Poland

== Venezuela ==
The following is the roster in the 2005 FIVB Volleyball World League.

No.	Name	Date of birth	Height	Weight	Spike	Block	2005 club
1	Alcides Olivar	8 March 1985	200 cm (6 ft 7 in)	81 kg (179 lb)	346 cm (136 in)	339 cm (133 in)	Yaracuy, San Felipe, VEN
2	Deivi Yustiz	15 June 1985	198 cm (6 ft 6 in)	76 kg (168 lb)	354 cm (139 in)	345 cm (136 in)	Yaracuy, San Felipe, Ven
3	Andy Rojas	2 October 1977	197 cm (6 ft 6 in)	95 kg (209 lb)	315 cm (124 in)	318 cm (125 in)	Ermoli Castelnuovo, ITA
4	Gustavo Valderrama	31 July 1977	192 cm (6 ft 4 in)	80 kg (180 lb)	323 cm (127 in)	323 cm (127 in)	Zulia, VEN
5	Rodman Valera	20 April 1982	188 cm (6 ft 2 in)	82 kg (181 lb)	337 cm (133 in)	332 cm (131 in)	Compoktuna, ESP
6	Carlos Luna	25 January 1981	194 cm (6 ft 4 in)	85 kg (187 lb)	339 cm (133 in)	331 cm (130 in)	Zulia, Venezuela
7	Luis Diaz	20 August 1983	204 cm (6 ft 8 in)	92 kg (203 lb)	349 cm (137 in)	342 cm (135 in)	Palma de Mallorca, Esp
8	Andres Manzanillo	1 August 1977	197 cm (6 ft 6 in)	80 kg (180 lb)	334 cm (131 in)	334 cm (131 in)	Dos Antiguos Alunos, Portugal
9	Franklin García	21 November 1985	198 cm (6 ft 6 in)	85 kg (187 lb)	344 cm (135 in)	338 cm (133 in)	Barinas, VEN
10	Ronald Mendez	26 October 1982	203 cm (6 ft 8 in)	84 kg (185 lb)	357 cm (141 in)	352 cm (139 in)	Bolivar, Argentina
11	Ernardo Gomez	30 July 1982	195 cm (6 ft 5 in)	90 kg (200 lb)	355 cm (140 in)	350 cm (140 in)	Toyoda Gosei, JAP
12	Carlos Tejeda	29 July 1980	198 cm (6 ft 6 in)	90 kg (200 lb)	340 cm (130 in)	315 cm (124 in)	Aragua, VEN
13	Iván Márquez	4 October 1981	205 cm (6 ft 9 in)	85 kg (187 lb)	339 cm (133 in)	333 cm (131 in)	Verening, BELGICA
14	Thomas Ereu	25 October 1979	194 cm (6 ft 4 in)	85 kg (187 lb)	352 cm (139 in)	345 cm (136 in)	Arona Tenerife, ESP
15	Francisco Soteldo	23 March 1986	200 cm (6 ft 7 in)	76 kg (168 lb)	347 cm (137 in)	341 cm (134 in)	Lara, Barqusimeto, VEN
16	Enderwuin Herrera	31 May 1983	190 cm (6 ft 3 in)	80 kg (180 lb)	343 cm (135 in)	338 cm (133 in)	Episcopal, ESPAÑA
17	Juan Carlos Blanco	27 July 1981	195 cm (6 ft 5 in)	83 kg (183 lb)	341 cm (134 in)	336 cm (132 in)	Indios de Miranda, VEN
18	Fredy Cedeno	10 September 1981	205 cm (6 ft 9 in)	95 kg (209 lb)	353 cm (139 in)	348 cm (137 in)	Arona Tenerife, España
