= 2007 FIVB Volleyball Men's World Cup squads =

This article shows all participating team squads at the 2007 FIVB Volleyball Men's World Cup, held from November 18 to December 2, 2007, in several cities in Japan.

== Argentina ==
- Head Coach: Jon Uriarte

#	Name	Date of birth	Weight	Height	Spike	Block
1	Marcos Milinkovic	22.12.1971	99	205	355	338
2	Gustavo Scholtis	16.12.1982	85	206	349	332
3	Diego Stepanenko	25.02.1985	90	204	349	337
4	Luciano de Cecco	02.06.1988	84	194	333	315
6	Santiago Orduna	31.08.1983	72	184	333	324
9	Lucas Chávez	03.04.1982	88	200	348	328
11	Joaquin Lucas Layus	11.11.1994	89	207	333	318
12	Martín Meana	26.04.1982	83	188	347	320
13	Guillermo García	21.09.1983	78	196	345	303
15	Rodrigo Quiroga	23.03.1987	84	194	345	327
17	Rodrigo Aschemacher	06.03.1989	91	202	343	327
18	Gastón Giani	26.04.1979	86	194	345	330

== Australia ==
- Head Coach: Russell Borgeaud

#	Name	Date of birth	Weight	Height	Spike	Block
2	Jarryd Christensen	22.08.1988	88	198	345	328
3	Nathan Roberts	17.02.1986	87	199	342	328
4	Benjamin Hardy	21.09.1974	94	198	335	320
5	Luke Campbell	08.11.1979	98	202	346	335
6	Igor Yudin	17.06.1987	85	200	357	330
7	Matthew Young	17.07.1981	78	188	335	323
8	Andrew Grant	22.04.1985	93	206	345	327
9	Andrew Earl	15.09.1982	85	196	336	322
11	Phillip DeSalvo	11.03.1985	78	182	326	308
13	David Ferguson	13.03.1982	90	205	348	328
17	Paul Carroll	16.05.1986	93	204	340	325
18	Brett Alderman	27.02.1979	90	191	343	328

== Brazil ==
- Head Coach: Bernardo Rezende

#	Name	Date of birth	Weight	Height	Spike	Block
1	Bruno Rezende	02.07.1986	76	190	323	302
2	Marcelo Elgarten	09.11.1974	78	183	321	308
4	André Heller	17.12.1975	93	199	339	321
6	Samuel Fuchs	04.03.1984	89	200	342	316
7	Gilberto Godoy Filho	23.12.1976	85	192	325	312
8	Murilo Endres	03.05.1981	76	190	343	319
9	André Nascimento	04.03.1979	95	195	340	320
10	Sérgio Dutra Santos	15.10.1975	78	184	325	310
11	Anderson Rodrigues	21.05.1974	95	190	330	321
13	Gustavo Endres	23.08.1975	98	203	337	325
14	Rodrigo Santana	17.04.1979	85	205	350	328
18	Dante Amaral	30.09.1980	86	201	345	327

== Bulgaria ==
- Head Coach: Martin Stoev

#	Name	Date of birth	Weight	Height	Spike	Block
1	Evgeni Ivanov	03.06.1974	99	210	351	340
2	Hristo Tsvetanov	29.03.1978	85	198	345	330
3	Andrey Zhekov	12.03.1980	82	190	340	263
4	Boyan Yordanov	12.03.1983	86	197	358	335
5	Krasimir Gaydarski	23.02.1983	96	204	350	330
6	Matey Kaziyski	23.09.1984	93	202	370	335
7	Nikolai Nikolov	29.07.1986	85	203	344	330
8	Ivan Stanev	07.07.1985	92	190	335	315
11	Vladimir Nikolov	03.10.1977	95	200	345	325
15	Todor Aleksiev	21.04.1983	96	200	347	327
17	Plamen Konstantinov	14.06.1973	93	202	347	330

== Egypt ==
- Head Coach: Ahmed Zakaria

#	Name	Date of birth	Weight	Height	Spike	Block
1	Hamdy Awad El-Safi	14.04.1972	105	202	346	327
2	Abdalla Ahmed	10.10.1983	72	198	352	331
3	Mohamed Gabal	21.01.1984	97	195	345	320
4	Ahmed El-Naeim	19.08.1984	87	197	342	316
5	Ossama Bekheit	12.01.1977	72	192	335	326
6	Wael Al-Aydy	08.12.1971	76	178	—	—
8	Saleh Youssef Fathy	25.07.1982	92	191	338	316
9	Mohamed El-Mahdy	02.09.1978	96	196	340	335
11	Mohamed El-Nafrawy	09.06.1983	92	200	335	320
13	Mohamed Badawy Moneim	11.01.1986	99	197	335	322
14	Hossam Shaarawy	15.02.1984	92	199	344	324
18	Mohamed El-Daabousi	01.03.1987	102	201	339	320

== Japan ==
- Head Coach: Tatsuya Ueta

#	Name	Date of birth	Weight	Height	Spike	Block
3	Shinya Chiba	05.12.1977	81	184	343	320
4	Kunihiro Shimizu	11.08.1986	94	192	348	330
5	Daisuke Usami	29.03.1979	83	184	340	320
7	Takahiro Yamamoto	12.07.1978	90	200	345	331
8	Masaji Ogino	08.01.1970	100	197	340	320
9	Takaaki Tomimatsu	20.07.1984	82	191	350	340
11	Yoshihiko Matsumoto	07.01.1981	75	193	356	330
12	Kota Yamamura	20.10.1980	95	205	350	330
15	Katsutoshi Tsumagari	02.11.1975	76	183	323	315
16	Yusuke Ishijima	09.01.1984	100	197	345	335
17	Yu Koshikawa	30.06.1984	87	190	345	325
18	Kosuke Tomonaga	22.07.1980	83	184	321	310

== Puerto Rico ==
- Head Coach: Carlos Cardona

#	Name	Date of birth	Weight	Height	Spike	Block
1	José Rivera	02.07.1977	85	192	325	320
2	Gregory Berrios	24.01.1979	83	182	305	299
4	Víctor Rivera	30.08.1976	88	195	345	329
5	Víctor Bird	16.03.1982	90	195	335	328
6	Ángel Pérez	20.05.1982	86	190	325	318
9	Luis Rodríguez	13.07.1969	89	202	340	333
12	Héctor Soto	20.06.1978	85	197	340	332
13	Alexis Matias	21.07.1974	88	195	335	325
14	Fernando Morales	04.02.1982	68	186	299	292
15	Enrique Escalante	06.08.1984	88	195	330	324
17	Emanuel Batista	12.01.1989	68	187	300	292
18	Mannix Román	17.01.1983	190	85	295	288

== Russia ==
- Head Coach: Vladimir Alekno

#	Name	Date of birth	Weight	Height	Spike	Block
1	Alexander Korneev	11.09.1980	96	200	348	339
2	Semen Poltavskiy	08.02.1981	89	205	346	338
4	Pavel Kruglov	17.09.1985	90	205	351	342
5	Pavel Abramov	23.04.1979	89	198	357	336
6	Sergey Grankin	21.01.1985	87	195	351	320
8	Serguei Tetioukine	23.09.1975	89	197	345	338
9	Vadim Khamuttskikh	26.11.1969	85	196	342	331
10	Yury Berezhko	27.01.1984	90	193	346	338
13	Alexei Ostapenko	26.05.1986	100	208	355	340
15	Alexander Volkov	14.02.1985	94	210	355	335
16	Alexey Verbov	31.01.1982	77	185	315	310
18	Alexei Kulechov	24.02.1979	96	206	353	344

== South Korea ==
- Head Coach: Yoo Jung-Tak

#	Name	Date of birth	Weight	Height	Spike	Block
1	Kim Hak-Min	04.09.1983	78	192	327	319
2	You Kwang-Woo	22.04.1985	80	185	320	312
4	Moon Sung-Min	14.09.1986	85	198	329	321
5	Yeo Oh-Hyun	02.09.1978	66	175	280	279
7	Lee Sun-Kyu	14.03.1981	87	200	325	320
8	Ha Hyun-Yong	09.05.1982	80	198	330	322
9	Shin Young-Soo	01.07.1982	90	197	300	290
12	Park Jun-Bum	12.06.1988	90	200	332	318
14	Kim Yo-han	16.08.1985	87	198	335	326
16	Song Byung-Il	03.04.1983	82	196	310	297
17	Ha Kyoung-Min	27.07.1982	82	201	320	310
18	Shin Yung-Suk	04.10.1986	88	200	335	325

== Spain ==
- Head Coach: Marcelo Méndez

#	Name	Date of birth	Weight	Height	Spike	Block
1	Rafael Pascual	16.03.1970	94	194	355	330
2	Ibán Pérez	13.11.1983	89	198	350	325
4	Manuel Sevillano	02.07.1981	90	194	340	320
6	Alfonso Flores	24.08.1975	90	189	340	330
9	Alexis Valido	09.03.1976	85	188	325	312
10	Miguel Ángel Falasca	29.04.1973	92	195	335	315
11	Javier Subiela	22.03.1984	88	198	340	325
12	Guillermo Falasca	24.10.1977	104	200	355	330
14	José Luis Moltó	29.06.1975	95	207	360	345
16	Julián García-Torres	08.11.1980	93	202	350	325
17	Enrique de la Fuente	11.08.1975	95	195	345	325
18	Israel Rodríguez	27.08.1981	95	195	360	340

== Tunisia ==
- Head Coach: Antonio Giaccobbe

#	Name	Date of birth	Weight	Height	Spike	Block
1	Amine Besrour	05.12.1978	78	181	309	295
3	Skander Ben Tara	22.01.1985	90	200	340	328
4	Marouane Garci	21.03.1988	73	194	317	308
8	Aymen Ben Brik	08.05.1985	68	188	330	322
9	Khaled Belaïd	30.12.1973	82	195	326	312
10	Haykel Jerbi	04.04.1988	63	187	305	286
12	Hichem Kaabi	03.09.1986	76	194	335	320
13	Noureddine Hfaiedh	27.08.1973	86	200	350	315
14	Bilel Ben Hassine	22.06.1982	72	192	330	305
15	Ghazi Guidara	18.05.1974	75	186	326	305
16	Chokri Jouini	25.04.1989	70	194	320	275
18	Hosni Karamosly	01.06.1980	82	197	338	315

== United States ==
- Head Coach: Hugh McCutcheon

#	Name	Date of birth	Weight	Height	Spike	Block
1	Lloy Ball	17.02.1972	95	203	351	316
2	Sean Rooney	13.11.1982	100	206	354	336
3	James Polster	08.02.1979	100	198	352	333
4	David Lee	08.03.1982	105	203	350	325
5	Richard Lambourne	06.05.1975	90	190	324	312
8	William Priddy	01.10.1977	89	196	353	330
9	Ryan Millar	22.01.1978	98	204	354	326
10	Riley Salmon	02.07.1976	89	197	345	331
12	Thomas Hoff	09.06.1973	94	198	353	333
13	Clayton Stanley	20.01.1978	104	205	357	332
14	Kevin Hansen	19.03.1982	93	196	349	330
15	Gabriel Gardner	18.03.1976	103	209	353	335
