= 2007 Asian Men's Volleyball Championship =

International volleyball tournament

Tournament details
- Host country: Indonesia
- City: Jakarta
- Dates: 31 August – 9 September
- Teams: 17
- Venues: 2 (in 1 host city)

Final positions
- Champions: Australia (1st title)
- Runners-up: Japan
- Third place: South Korea
- Fourth place: China

Tournament awards
- MVP: (Australia) Dan Howard

The Asian Men's Volleyball Championship was the fourteenth staging of the Asian Men's Volleyball Championship, a biennial international volleyball tournament organised by the Asian Volleyball Confederation (AVC) with Indonesian Volleyball Federation (PBVSI). The tournament was held in Jakarta, Indonesia from 31 August to 9 September 2007.

== Venues ==
Jakarta, Indonesia
Istora Senayan	Senayan Tennis Indoor Stadium
Capacity: 10,000	Capacity: Unknown

== Pools composition ==
The teams are seeded based on their final ranking at the 2005 Asian Men's Volleyball Championship.

Pool A	Pool B	Pool C	Pool D
Indonesia (Host)	Japan (1st)	China (2nd)	South Korea (3rd)
Qatar (7th); Maldives; Chinese Taipei	Iran (6th); Pakistan; Vietnam	Thailand (5th); Sri Lanka; Saudi Arabia	India (4th); Kazakhstan; Kuwait; Australia

== Preliminary round ==
=== Pool A ===
Pos	Team	Pld	W	L	Pts	SW	SL	SR	SPW	SPL	SPR	Qualification
1	Chinese Taipei	2	2	0	4	6	1	6.000	179	132	1.356	Pool E
2	Qatar	2	1	1	3	4	3	1.333	169	148	1.142	
3	Maldives	2	0	2	2	0	6	0.000	82	150	0.547	

Date	Time		Score		Set 1	Set 2	Set 3	Set 4	Set 5	Total
31 Aug	17:00	Qatar	1–3	Chinese Taipei	19–25	30–28	24–26	21–25		94–104
01 Sep	13:45	Maldives	0–3	Qatar	15–25	15–25	14–25			44–75
02 Sep	18:15	Chinese Taipei	3–0	Maldives	25–13	25–15	25–10			75–38

=== Pool B ===
Pos	Team	Pld	W	L	Pts	SW	SL	SR	SPW	SPL	SPR	Qualification
1	Iran	2	2	0	4	6	2	3.000	193	158	1.222	Pool F
2	Pakistan	2	1	1	3	4	5	0.800	198	197	1.005	
3	Vietnam	2	0	2	2	3	6	0.500	174	210	0.829	

Date	Time		Score		Set 1	Set 2	Set 3	Set 4	Set 5	Total
31 Aug	14:45	Iran	3–1	Vietnam	25–17	25–16	23–25	25–14		98–72
01 Sep	16:00	Pakistan	1–3	Iran	18–25	25–20	22–25	21–25		86–95
02 Sep	13:45	Vietnam	2–3	Pakistan	20–25	25–21	28–26	21–25	8–15	102–112

=== Pool C ===
Pos	Team	Pld	W	L	Pts	SW	SL	SR	SPW	SPL	SPR	Qualification
1	Thailand	2	2	0	4	6	1	6.000	172	133	1.293	Pool E
2	Saudi Arabia	2	1	1	3	4	3	1.333	153	145	1.055	
3	Sri Lanka	2	0	2	2	0	6	0.000	103	150	0.687	

Date	Time		Score		Set 1	Set 2	Set 3	Set 4	Set 5	Total
31 Aug	20:00	Thailand	3–0	Sri Lanka	25–17	25–17	25–21			75–55
01 Sep	18:15	Saudi Arabia	1–3	Thailand	25–22	21–25	16–25	16–25		78–97
02 Sep	16:00	Sri Lanka	0–3	Saudi Arabia	14–25	11–25	23–25			48–75

=== Pool D ===
Pos	Team	Pld	W	L	Pts	SW	SL	SR	SPW	SPL	SPR	Qualification
1	Australia	3	3	0	6	9	1	9.000	247	170	1.453	Pool F
2	India	3	2	1	5	7	5	1.400	277	264	1.049	
3	Kazakhstan	3	1	2	4	5	6	0.833	234	252	0.929	
4	Kuwait	3	0	3	3	0	9	0.000	155	227	0.683	

Date	Time		Score		Set 1	Set 2	Set 3	Set 4	Set 5	Total
31 Aug	14:45	Australia	3–1	India	22–25	25–19	25–18	25–23		97–85
31 Aug	17:00	Kuwait	0–3	Kazakhstan	19–25	16–25	25–27			60–77
01 Sep	16:00	India	3–2	Kazakhstan	25–20	24–26	25–20	25–27	18–16	117–109
01 Sep	18:15	Australia	3–0	Kuwait	25–11	25–15	25–11			75–37
02 Sep	16:00	Kuwait	0–3	India	19–25	22–25	17–25			58–75
02 Sep	18:15	Kazakhstan	0–3	Australia	14–25	20–25	14–25			48–75

== Classification round ==
- The results and the points of the matches between the same teams that were already played during the preliminary round shall be taken into account for the classification round.

=== Pool E ===
Pos	Team	Pld	W	L	Pts	SW	SL	SR	SPW	SPL	SPR	Qualification
1	China	3	3	0	6	9	5	1.800	310	278	1.115	Championship
2	Thailand	3	1	2	4	7	8	0.875	322	316	1.019	Championship
3	Indonesia	3	1	2	4	7	8	0.875	314	326	0.963	Championship
4	Chinese Taipei	3	1	2	4	6	8	0.750	294	320	0.919	Championship

Date	Time		Score		Set 1	Set 2	Set 3	Set 4	Set 5	Total
03 Sep	16:00	Indonesia	3–2	Thailand	25–23	22–25	25–18	22–25	15–12	109–103
03 Sep	20:30	China	3–1	Chinese Taipei	25–15	20–25	25–18	25–21		95–79
04 Sep	16:00	Indonesia	2–3	Chinese Taipei	17–25	25–17	31–33	25–21	16–18	114–114
04 Sep	18:15	China	3–2	Thailand	25–18	18–25	25–23	19–25	19–17	106–108
05 Sep	16:00	Indonesia	2–3	China	16–25	15–25	25–21	25–23	10–15	91–109
05 Sep	18:15	Chinese Taipei	2–3	Thailand	18–25	25–23	25–23	22–25	11–15	101–111

=== Pool F ===
Pos	Team	Pld	W	L	Pts	SW	SL	SR	SPW	SPL	SPR	Qualification
1	Australia	3	3	0	6	9	6	1.500	318	313	1.016	Championship
2	Japan	3	2	1	5	8	4	2.000	275	251	1.096	Championship
3	South Korea	3	1	2	4	6	6	1.000	275	279	0.986	Championship
4	Iran	3	0	3	3	2	9	0.222	237	262	0.905	Championship

Date	Time		Score		Set 1	Set 2	Set 3	Set 4	Set 5	Total
03 Sep	13:45	Japan	2–3	Australia	21–25	25–19	25–20	20–25	9–15	100–104
03 Sep	18:15	South Korea	3–0	Iran	27–25	28–26	25–21			80–72
04 Sep	13:45	Japan	3–0	Iran	25–22	28–26	25–15			78–63
04 Sep	20:30	South Korea	2–3	Australia	25–20	22–25	25–20	21–25	18–20	111–110
05 Sep	13:45	Japan	3–1	South Korea	25–16	26–24	21–25	25–19		97–84
05 Sep	20:30	Iran	2–3	Australia	23–25	25–17	16–25	25–22	13–15	102–104

=== Pool G ===
Pos	Team	Pld	W	L	Pts	SW	SL	SR	SPW	SPL	SPR	Qualification
1	Qatar	3	3	0	6	9	0	MAX	229	161	1.422	9th–12th place
2	Saudi Arabia	3	2	1	5	6	3	2.000	213	168	1.268	9th–12th place
3	Sri Lanka	3	1	2	4	3	7	0.429	201	229	0.878	13th–16th place
4	Maldives	3	0	3	3	1	9	0.111	164	249	0.659	13th–16th place

Date	Time		Score		Set 1	Set 2	Set 3	Set 4	Set 5	Total
04 Sep	13:45	Qatar	3–0	Sri Lanka	25–18	25–9	29–27			79–54
04 Sep	16:00	Saudi Arabia	3–0	Maldives	25–13	25–11	25–21			75–45
05 Sep	13:45	Maldives	1–3	Sri Lanka	20–25	12–25	26–24	17–25		75–99
05 Sep	16:00	Qatar	3–0	Saudi Arabia	25–23	25–17	25–23			75–63

=== Pool H ===
Pos	Team	Pld	W	L	Pts	SW	SL	SR	SPW	SPL	SPR	Qualification
1	India	4	4	0	8	12	2	6.000	346	281	1.231	9th–12th place
2	Kazakhstan	4	3	1	7	11	4	2.750	359	312	1.151	9th–12th place
3	Pakistan	4	2	2	6	6	8	0.750	317	316	1.003	13th–16th place
4	Vietnam	4	1	3	5	6	9	0.667	302	341	0.886	13th–16th place
5	Kuwait	4	0	4	4	0	12	0.000	234	308	0.760	

Date	Time		Score		Set 1	Set 2	Set 3	Set 4	Set 5	Total
03 Sep	18:15	India	3–0	Vietnam	25–16	25–16	25–15			75–47
03 Sep	20:30	Pakistan	3–0	Kuwait	25–18	25–13	31–29			81–60
04 Sep	18:15	Pakistan	0–3	Kazakhstan	19–25	23–25	15–25			57–75
04 Sep	20:30	Vietnam	3–0	Kuwait	25–20	25–15	25–21			75–56
05 Sep	18:15	Vietnam	1–3	Kazakhstan	18–25	17–25	25–23	18–25		78–98
05 Sep	20:30	Pakistan	0–3	India	20–25	27–29	20–25			67–79

== Final round ==
- The results and the points of the matches between the same teams that were already played during the previous rounds shall be taken into account for the final round.

=== Classification 13th–16th ===
Pos	Team	Pld	W	L	Pts	SW	SL	SR	SPW	SPL	SPR
13	Pakistan	3	3	0	6	9	2	4.500	263	202	1.302
14	Sri Lanka	3	2	1	5	6	6	1.000	249	259	0.961
15	Vietnam	3	1	2	4	7	6	1.167	285	261	1.092
16	Maldives	3	0	3	3	1	9	0.111	174	249	0.699

Date	Time		Score		Set 1	Set 2	Set 3	Set 4	Set 5	Total
06 Sep	13:45	Sri Lanka	3–2	Vietnam	11–25	13–25	25–21	26–24	15–13	90–108
06 Sep	16:00	Pakistan	3–0	Maldives	25–11	25–13	25–16			75–40
07 Sep	13:45	Maldives	0–3	Vietnam	18–25	23–25	18–25			59–75
07 Sep	16:00	Sri Lanka	0–3	Pakistan	24–26	18–25	18–25			60–76

=== Classification 9th–12th ===
Pos	Team	Pld	W	L	Pts	SW	SL	SR	SPW	SPL	SPR
9	India	3	3	0	6	9	4	2.250	300	271	1.107
10	Kazakhstan	3	2	1	5	8	4	2.000	277	263	1.053
11	Qatar	3	1	2	4	6	6	1.000	256	264	0.970
12	Saudi Arabia	3	0	3	3	0	9	0.000	190	225	0.844

Date	Time		Score		Set 1	Set 2	Set 3	Set 4	Set 5	Total
06 Sep	18:15	Qatar	1–3	Kazakhstan	21–25	25–18	16–25	20–25		82–93
06 Sep	20:30	India	3–0	Saudi Arabia	25–22	25–22	25–19			75–63
07 Sep	18:15	Saudi Arabia	0–3	Kazakhstan	23–25	19–25	22–25			64–75
07 Sep	20:30	Qatar	2–3	India	25–22	25–21	21–25	18–25	10–15	99–108

=== Championship ===
Pos	Team	Pld	W	L	Pts	SW	SL	SR	SPW	SPL	SPR
1	Australia	7	6	1	13	20	9	2.222	665	616	1.080
2	Japan	7	5	2	12	17	7	2.429	563	482	1.168
3	South Korea	7	5	2	12	18	6	3.000	575	514	1.119
4	China	7	5	2	12	15	13	1.154	625	613	1.020
5	Iran	7	3	4	10	11	16	0.688	617	612	1.008
6	Thailand	7	2	5	9	12	17	0.706	616	638	0.966
7	Indonesia	7	1	6	8	7	20	0.350	564	640	0.881
8	Chinese Taipei	7	1	6	8	8	20	0.400	554	664	0.834

Date	Time		Score		Set 1	Set 2	Set 3	Set 4	Set 5	Total
06 Sep	13:45	China	3–0	Iran	36–34	25–22	25–20			86–76
06 Sep	16:00	Australia	3–0	Chinese Taipei	25–15	25–20	25–21			75–56
06 Sep	18:15	Thailand	0–3	South Korea	21–25	20–25	21–25			62–75
06 Sep	20:30	Japan	3–0	Indonesia	25–18	25–21	25–15			75–54
07 Sep	13:45	Thailand	2–3	Iran	20–25	25–22	16–25	25–22	11–15	97–109
07 Sep	16:00	Japan	3–0	Chinese Taipei	25–13	25–14	25–12			75–39
07 Sep	18:15	Australia	3–0	Indonesia	25–20	36–34	27–25			88–79
07 Sep	20:30	China	0–3	South Korea	20–25	17–25	21–25			58–75
08 Sep	13:45	Australia	3–0	Thailand	25–21	25–20	25–19			75–60
08 Sep	16:00	China	0–3	Japan	20–25	22–25	21–25			63–75
08 Sep	18:15	Indonesia	0–3	Iran	22–25	24–26	16–25			62–76
08 Sep	20:30	South Korea	3–0	Chinese Taipei	25–22	25–21	25–17			75–60
09 Sep	11:30	Chinese Taipei	2–3	Iran	20–25	32–30	26–24	19–25	8–15	105–119
09 Sep	14:00	Indonesia	0–3	South Korea	17–25	17–25	21–25			55–75
09 Sep	16:10	China	3–2	Australia	21–25	26–24	21–25	25–23	15–12	108–109
09 Sep	18:15	Thailand	3–0	Japan	25–20	25–20	25–23			75–63

== Final standing ==
Rank	Team
1st place, gold medalist(s)	Australia
2nd place, silver medalist(s)	Japan
3rd place, bronze medalist(s)	South Korea
4	China
5	Iran
6	Thailand
7	Indonesia
8	Chinese Taipei
9	India
10	Kazakhstan
11	Qatar
12	Saudi Arabia
13	Pakistan
14	Sri Lanka
15	Vietnam
16	Maldives
17	Kuwait

Qualified for the 2007 World Cup and 2008 World Olympic Qualifier 3
Qualified for the 2008 World Olympic Qualifier 3
Qualified for the 2008 World Olympic Qualifier 1 or 2
Already qualified as hosts for the 2007 World Cup and 2008 World Olympic Qualifier 3
Already qualified as hosts for the 2008 Summer Olympics

2007 Asian Men's champions

Australia
1st title

Team Roster
Benjamin Hardy, Dan Howard, Luke Campbell, David Ferguson, Andrew Grant, Andrew Earl, Igor Yudin, Nathan Roberts, Paul Carroll, Phillip De Salvo, Matthew Young, Brett Alderman
Head Coach: Russell Borgeuad

== Awards ==
- MVP: (Australia) Dan Howard
- Best scorer: (Iran) Mohammad Mohammadkazem
- Best spiker: (South Korea) Lee Kyung-soo
- Best blocker: (South Korea) Lee Sun-kyu
- Best server: (Japan) Yu Koshikawa
- Best setter: (Japan) Kosuke Tomonaga
- Best libero: (South Korea) Yeo Oh-hyun
- Best receiver: (Thailand) Siriphum Supachai
