= You Kwang-woo =

South Korean volleyball player (born 1985)

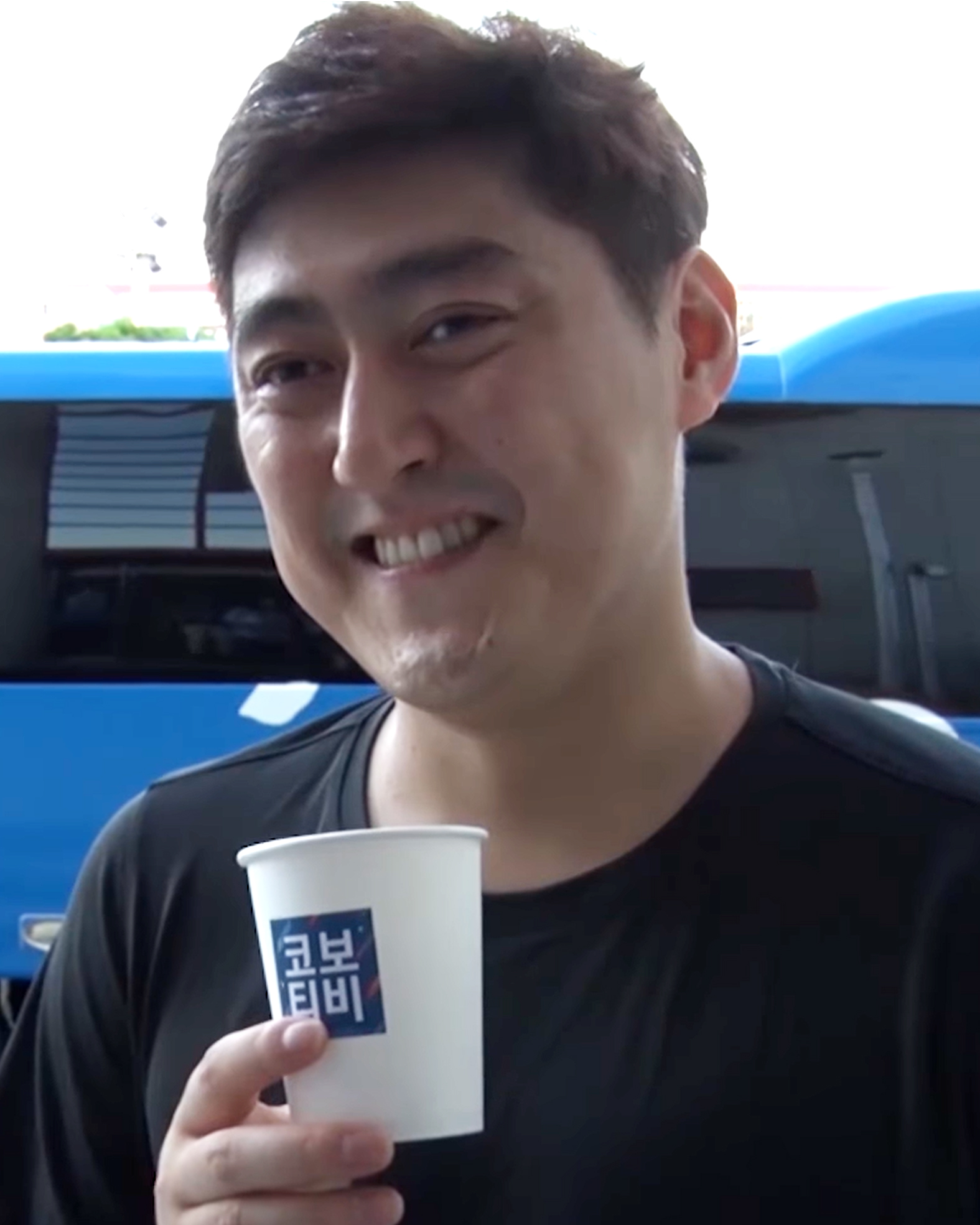
- You in 2018

Personal information
- Nationality: South Korean
- Born: 22 April 1985 (age 41) Seoul, South Korea
- Education: Inha University
- Height: 185 cm (6 ft 1 in)
- Weight: 85 kg (187 lb)
- Spike: 311 cm (122 in)
- Block: 300 cm (118 in)

Volleyball information
- Position: Setter
- Current club: Seoul Woori Card Wibee
- Number: 3

Career
- Years: Team
- 2007–2017 2017–: Samsung Fire Bluefangs; Woori Card Wibee

National team
- Years: Team
- 2007–2015: South Korea
Medal record
Asian Championship
Bronze medal – third place	2007 Jakarta
Asian Junior Championship
Gold medal – first place	2004 Doha
- Updated on 18 December 2017

You Kwang-woo (Korean: 유광우; born 22 April 1985 in Seoul) is a South Korean male volleyball player. You competed at the 2007 FIVB World Cup and the 2015 FIVB World League as part of the South Korea men's national volleyball team. On club level he currently plays for Incheon Korean Air Jumbos.
