= Henrique Randow =

Brazilian volleyball player (born 1978)

Personal information
- Full name: Henrique Zech Coelho Von Randow
- Nationality: Brazilian
- Born: 5 April 1978 (age 48); Belo Horizonte, Minas Gerais
- Height: 2.01 m (6 ft 7 in)
- Weight: 102 kg (225 lb)

Volleyball information
- Position: Middle blocker

National team
2001–2005	Brazil
Honours
Men's volleyball
Representing Brazil
World Championship
Gold medal – first place	2002 Argentina	Team
World Grand Champions Cup
Silver medal – second place	2001 Japan	Team
World League
Gold medal – first place	2001 Katowice	Team
Gold medal – first place	2003 Madrid	Team
Gold medal – first place	2004 Rome	Team
Gold medal – first place	2005 Belgrade	Team
Silver medal – second place	2002 Belo Horizonte	Team

Henrique Zech Coelho Van Randow known as Henrique (born April 5, 1978) is a former Brazilian volleyball player.

He competed at the 2002 FIVB Men's Volleyball World Championship, where Brazil won their first world title.
