= Steve Keir =

Australian volleyball player (born 1979)

Steven Keir

Personal information
- Nationality: Australian
- Born: 8 November 1979 (age 46)

National team
2000	Australia

Steven "Steve" Keir (born 8 November 1979) is a former Australian male volleyball player. He was part of the Australia men's national volleyball team. He competed with the national team at the 2000 Summer Olympics in Sydney, Australia, finishing 8th.

== See also ==
- Australia at the 2000 Summer Olympics
