= Zane Christensen =

Australian volleyball player (born 1985)

Personal information
- Nationality: Australian
- Born: 19 July 1985 (age 41)
- Height: 2.09 m (6 ft 10 in)
- Weight: 103 kg (227 lb)
- Spike: 368 cm (145 in)
- Block: 342 cm (135 in)

Volleyball information
- Number: 14

Career
- Years: Team
- 2004: (Italy) Copra Asystel Piacenza

National team
- Years: Team
- 2004: Australia

Zane Christensen (born 19 July 1985) is a former Australian male volleyball player. He was part of the Australia men's national volleyball team. He competed with the national team at the 2004 Summer Olympics in Athens, Greece. He played with Copra Asystel Piacenza in 2004.

== Clubs ==
- (Italy) Copra Asystel Piacenza (2004)

== See also ==
- Australia at the 2004 Summer Olympics
