= Igor Yudin =

Australian volleyball player (born 1987)

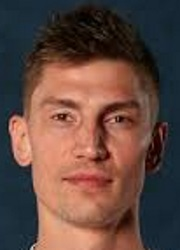

Personal information
- Nationality: Russian; Australian
- Born: 17 June 1987 (age 39); Yekaterinburg, Russia
- Height: 2.02 m (6 ft 8 in)
- Weight: 88 kg (194 lb)
- Spike: 365 cm (144 in)
- Block: 356 cm (140 in)

Volleyball information
- Position: Outside hitter/Opposite

Career
Years	Teams
2005–2006; 2006–2011; 2011–2012; 2012–2013; 2013–2014; 2014–2015; 2015; 2016–2017; 2017–2018; 2018–2020; 2020–2021	Minas Tênis Clube; Jastrzębski Węgiel; AZS Olsztyn; Yaroslavich Yaroslavl; Kuzbass Kemerovo; Dynamo Krasnodar; Galatasaray Istanbul; Łuczniczka Bydgoszcz; Zenit Kazan; Gas Sales Piacenza; Emma Villas Volley

National team
2004–2012	Australia
Honours
Representing Australia
Men's volleyball
Asian Championship
Gold medal – first place	2007 Indonesia
- Last updated: 15 December 2021

Igor Yudin (born 17 June 1987) is an Australian volleyball player with Russian origins, a member of Australia men's national volleyball team in 2004–2012, a participant of the 2012 Olympic Games, 2007 Asian Champion.

== Personal life ==
Yudin was born in Yekaterinburg, Russia. He moved to Australia with his family, when he was 14. He has a mother called Tatiana, a stepfather called Russel, and a sister called Victoria who live in Australia. His wife, daughter, and son live Poland. Yudin has had a Russian citizenship since 2013. Igor attended Eltham High School.

== Career ==
He was the Australian volleyball captain at the 2012 Olympic Games. In 2013, He has had a Russian citizenship and stopped playing for the Australian national team. In 2016, Yudin started playing for Russia.

== Sporting achievements ==
=== Clubs ===
==== FIVB Club World Championship ====
- Poland 2017 - with Zenit Kazan

==== CEV Challenge Cup ====
- 2008/2009 - with Jastrzębski Węgiel

==== National championships ====
- 2005/2006 Brazilian Championship, with Minas Tênis Clube
- 2006/2007 Polish Championship, with Jastrzębski Węgiel
- 2008/2009 Polish Championship, with Jastrzębski Węgiel
- 2009/2010 Polish Cup, with Jastrzębski Węgiel
- 2009/2010 Polish Championship, with Jastrzębski Węgiel
- 2017/2018 Russian Championship, with Zenit Kazan

=== National team ===
- 2007 Asian Championship
