= Steven Brinkman =

Canadian volleyball player (born 1978)

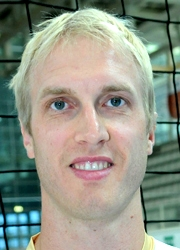
- Portrait of Steve Brinkman

Personal information
- Nationality: Canadian
- Born: 12 January 1978 (age 48)

Volleyball information
- Number: 11

National team
2002-2010	Canada

Steven Brinkman (born 12 January 1978) is a Canadian male volleyball player. He was part of the Canada men's national volleyball team at the 2002 FIVB Volleyball Men's World Championship and 2006 FIVB Volleyball Men's World Championship.
