= Grant Sorensen =

Australian volleyball player (born 1982)

Personal information
- Nationality: Australian
- Born: 27 March 1982 (age 44)
- Height: 197 cm (6 ft 6 in)
- Weight: 93 kg (205 lb)
- Spike: 340 cm (134 in)
- Block: 328 cm (129 in)

Volleyball information
- Number: 3

Career
Years	Teams
2002	Queensland Pirates, Brisbane

National team
2002-2004	Australia

Grant Sorensen (born 27 March 1982) is an Australian retired volleyball player. He was part of the Australia men's national volleyball team at the 2002 FIVB Volleyball Men's World Championship in Japan. Two years later he played at the 2004 Summer Olympics in Athens. He was born in Ipswich, Queensland, Australia and his team played for Queensland Pirates. Sorensen ended his career in 2004.

== Clubs ==
- Queensland Pirates, Brisbane (2002)
