= Alessandro Farina =

Italian footballer (born 1979)

Personal information
- Date of birth: 20 February 1979 (age 47)
- Place of birth: Olbia, Italy
- Height: 1.84 m (6 ft 1/2 in)
- Position: Defender

Senior career*
Years	Team	Apps	(Gls)
1995–2002	Olbia	120	(0)
2002–2004	Fermana	63	(0)
2004–2005	Latina	31	(1)
2005–2006	Acireale	32	(1)
2006	Grosseto	5	(0)
2007–2010	Cavese	94	(1)
2010–2012	Latina	59	(3)
2012–2013	Mantova	29	(0)
2013–2016	Olbia		
2016	San Teodoro	10	(0)
- * Club domestic league appearances and goals

Alessandro Farina (born 20 February 1979) is an Italian former football defender.

== Appearances on Italian Series ==
Serie C1 : 147 Apps, 1 Goal

Serie C2 : 58 Apps, 1 Goal

Serie D : 93 Apps

Total : 298 Apps, 2 Goals
