= Hidde Van Beest =

Australian volleyball player (born 1979)

Hidde Van Beest (born 20 July 1979 in Arnhem, Gelderland) is an Australian volleyball player, who was born in the Netherlands. A Queensland resident, he played college volleyball in the United States, and twice competed for Australia at the Summer Olympics: Sydney 2000 and Athens 2004.

He attended Craigslea State High School, where he excelled in his chosen sport from the outset.
