= Vincent Montmeát =

French volleyball player (born 1977)

Personal information
- Nationality: French
- Born: 1 September 1977 (age 49)
- Height: 1.96 m (6 ft 5 in)
- Weight: 88 kg (194 lb)
- Spike: 348 cm (137 in)
- Block: 330 cm (130 in)

Volleyball information
- Number: 10

Career
- Years: Team
- 2004: (France) Stade Poitevin Poitiers

National team
- Years: Team
- 2004: France

Vincent Montmeát (born 1 September 1977) is a former French male volleyball player. He was part of the France men's national volleyball team. He competed with the national team at the 2004 Summer Olympics in Athens, Greece. He played with Stade Poitevin Poitiers in 2004.

== Clubs ==
- (France) Stade Poitevin Poitiers (2004)

== See also ==
- France at the 2004 Summer Olympics
