= Jerónimo Bidegain =

Argentine volleyball player

- Bidegain in 2007

Personal information
- Full name: Jerónimo Aníbal Bidegain
- Born: January 16, 1977 (age 49); Buenos Aires, Argentina
- Height: 2.00 m (6 ft 7 in)
- Weight: 93 kg (205 lb)
- Spike: 350 cm (140 in)
- Block: 325 cm (128 in)

Volleyball information
- Position: Hitter - Receptor Attack
- Current club: Retired

National team
1993-2008	Argentina
Honours
Men's volleyball
Representing Argentina

Jerónimo Aníbal Bidegain (born January 16, 1977) is a former Argentine volleyball player, recognized for his career in international competitions and tournaments. He accompanied the Argentine national team in the Olympic Games of Athens 2004 and the Olympic Games of Sydney 2000.

== Career ==
Bidegain began his career at an early age at Club Italiano de Caballito, showing an exceptional talent that led him to his first transfer to Club de Amigos and a little later on loan to *Ferro Carril Oeste, club with which he was crowned South American Champion in Lima Peru in 1998, along with Hugo Conte and Waldo Kantor.

The growth of his career allowed him to play in different parts of the world and in competitions such as La Liga of Spain, the Super Cup, and Champions League.

He became a part of the Argentine national team from an early age, starting in the junior categories in 1993, and quickly moving on to the youth teams until he secured a place in the senior national team.

=== Brazil ===
He was acquired by Ulbra Ferrace São Paulo Futebol Clube, where he participated in different regional and national tournaments; the Campeonato Gaúcho de Voleibol Masculino tournament, the FPV – Federação Paulista de Volleyball and also the Brazilian Super League.

Brazilian Super League, in addition to regional tournaments in the municipality of Botucatu.

=== Europe and Asia ===
After consolidating his career in Argentina, Bidegain made the leap to Europe where he played for several renowned clubs. In Spain he joined Almeria and made one of the best campaigns in his career, becoming champion of La Liga, Champion of the Copa del Rey, Champion of the Super Cup, and participating in the championship of champions, the Champions League.

In Italy he played Lega Pallavolo Serie A and was part of the Italian team Pallavolo Modena with Llay Ball, Roman Yakovlev, and Alexei Kazakov.

He also had a brief stint in the Greek Orestiadas.

In 2001 he returned to Argentina to play for the club ROJAS SCHOLEM, and together with teammates from the national team, they become champions of the Argentine League, champions of the Super Cuatro Tournament. Once again, as he had already done with FerroCarril Oeste, he was crowned South American champion, but this time in Uruguay and with a club.

=== Role as Manager of the Women's National Team: Las Panteras. ===
Bidegain also had a brief but influential stint as manager of the Argentine women's volleyball national team. His transition from player to manager proved to be a transformational change for the team. Bidegain's experience, passion, and strategic vision resulted in unprecedented exposure and publicity campaign for the team on the eve of the Rio 2016 Olympic Games.

His ability to inspire and lead in their pursuit of sporting excellence translated into a wave of support and enthusiasm throughout Argentina. The publicity campaign and exposure generated during this time helped elevate women's volleyball to new heights in Argentina.

== Real Estate Development. ==
After his retirement from professional volleyball, Bidegain started a new career in real estate development. He applied the discipline and dedication that characterized him as an athlete to his new facet as an entrepreneur. Over time, he became a successful real estate developer, participating in outstanding projects in Argentina and abroad.

== Teams ==
- 1993- 1996 (Argentina) Club Italiano
- 1996-1998 (Argentina) Club De Amigos
- 1998 (Argentina) Ferro Carril Oeste
- 1999-2002 (Italy) Panini Modena
- 2002-2003 (Spain) CV Almería (Champion)
- 2003-2004 (Argentina) Swiss Medical Monteros (Champion)
- 2005-2006 (Brazil) ULBRA
- 2006-2007 (Turkey) Fenerbahçe Istanbul
- 2007 (Argentina) Azul Volley
- 2008 (Italy) Olio Pignatelli Isernia
- 2009 (Argentina) Chubut Volley
- 2011 Retirement (Argentina) Instituto Dr. Carlos Pellegrini
