= Sébastien Frangolacci =

French volleyball player

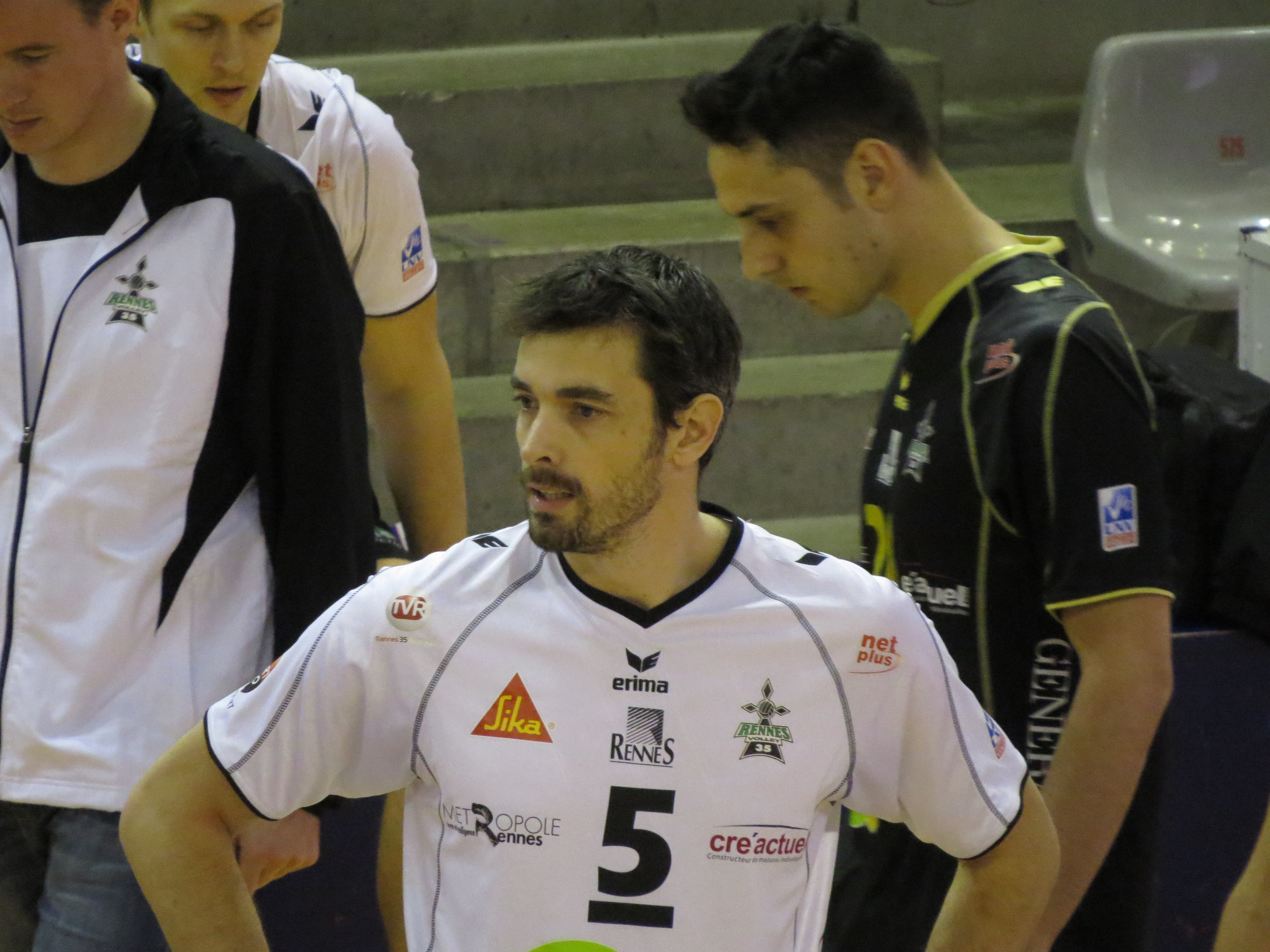

Personal information
- Nationality: French
- Born: 31 March 1976 (age 50); Champigny-sur-Marne, France
- Height: 1.92 m (6 ft 4 in)
- Weight: 88 kg (194 lb)
- Spike: 340 cm (134 in)
- Block: 322 cm (127 in)

Volleyball information
- Position: Outside hitter
- Current club: AS Sartrouville VB

Career
Years	Teams
1995–2001; 2001–2005; 2005–2006; 2006–2008; 2008–2010; 2010–2014; 2014–2016; 2016–	Asnières Volley 92; Paris Volley; Stade Poitevin Poitiers; Tours VB; Stade Poitevin Poitiers; Rennes Volley 35; Paris Volley; AS Sartrouville VB

National team
2011–	France
Honours
Men's volleyball
Representing France
World Championship
Bronze medal – third place	2002 Argentina
European Championships
Silver medal – second place	2003 Germany
- Last updated: 2 January 2018

Sébastien Frangolacci (born 31 March 1976) is a French volleyball player, who won the bronze medal with the France men's national volleyball team at the 2002 World Championship. He was part of French squad at the 2004 Olympics.
