= Chrysanthos Kyriazis =

Greek volleyball player (born 1972)

Personal information
- Nationality: Greek
- Born: 21 April 1972 (age 54); Preveza
- Height: 195 cm (6 ft 5 in)
- Weight: 84 kg (185 lb)
- Spike: 338 cm (133 in)
- Block: 322 cm (127 in)

Career
Years	Teams
2001-2004	Olympiacos

National team
Greece

Chrysanthos Kyriazis (born 21 April 1972) is a retired Greek volleyball player. He was part of the Greece men's national volleyball team at the 2002 FIVB Volleyball Men's World Championship in Argentina. At club level, he played for Olympiacos.

== Clubs ==
- (Greece) Olympiacos
