= Benjamin Hardy =

Australian volleyball player (born 1974)

Personal information
- Full name: Benjamin Kirk Hardy
- Nickname: Captain Kirk
- Nationality: Australian
- Born: 21 September 1974 (age 52); Sydney, Australia
- Height: 1.98 m (6 ft 6 in)
- Weight: 94 kg (207 lb)
- Spike: 335 cm (132 in)
- Block: 320 cm (130 in)

Volleyball information
- Position: Outside hitter
- Number: 4

Career
Years	Teams
1994–1996; 1996–1998; 1998–1999; 1999–2000; 2000–2001; 2001–2002; 2002–2003; 2003–2004; 2004–2008; 2008–2011	Evivo Düren; Felbach Stuttgart; Pallavolo Reima Crema; Trentino Volley; Sempre Volley; Bossini Montichiari; Pallavolo Loreto; Brillrover Bolzano; Knack Randstad Roeselare; Jastrzębski Węgiel

National team
Australia
Honours
Representing Australia
Men's volleyball
Asian Championships
Gold medal – first place	2007 Indonesia
Silver medal – second place	1999 Iran
Silver medal – second place	2001 South Korea
- Last updated: 20 February 2017

Benjamin Kirk Hardy (born 21 September 1974) is an Australian former volleyball player.

== Career ==
Hardy played for Australia's volleyball team at the 2000 Olympics. He was a captain of Australian national team. He won a gold medal at the 2007 Asian Men's Volleyball Championship. He ended his sport career in 2011.

== Achievements ==
=== Club ===
- 1998/1998 Australian Volleyball League Championship, with AIS
- 2004/2005 Belgium Cup, with Knack Randstad Roeselare
- 2004/2005 Belgium Championship, with Knack Randstad Roeselare
- 2005/2006 Belgium Cup, with Knack Randstad Roeselare
- 2005/2006 Belgium Championship, with Knack Randstad Roeselare
- 2006/2007 Belgium Championship, with Knack Randstad Roeselare
- 2007/2008 Belgium Championship, with Knack Randstad Roeselare
- 2009/2010 Polish Championship, with Jastrzębski Węgiel
- 2009/2010 Polish Championship, with Jastrzębski Węgiel
- 2011/2012 Australian Championship, with Canberra Heat
- 2013/2014 Australian Championship, with Canberra Heat

=== International ===
Asian Championships:

- 1999 Iran
- 2001 South Korea
- 2007 Indonesia
