= Mathias Patin =

French volleyball player (born 1974)

Medal record

Representing France

Men's Volleyball

World Championships
Bronze medal – third place	Argentina 2002	Team

European Championships
Silver medal – second place	2003 Germany	Team

Mathias Patin (born April 25, 1974 in Colombes, Hauts-de-Seine) is a French volleyball player, who won the bronze medal with the France men's national volleyball team at the 2002 World Championships. He is 1.85 meters tall and plays as a passer. He is now teaching in Paris 1 Panthéon-Sorbonne University in Paris, France.

== Clubs ==
Club	Country	From	Until
Asnières Volley 92	France	1995–1996	2002–2003
Paris Volley	France	2003–2004	2004–2005
Arago de Sète	France	2005–2006	2005–2006
Tours Volley-Ball	France	2006–2007	2007–2008
Asnières Volley 92	France	2007–2008	...

== Awards ==
- Championnat de France : 2003 (Championship of France Pro A of male volley ball)
