= Alexis Valido =

Spanish volleyball player (born 1976)

Personal information
- Full name: José Alexis Valido Moreno
- Nationality: Spanish
- Born: March 9, 1976 (age 50); Las Palmas de Gran Canaria, Spain
- Height: 1.88 m (6 ft 2 in)
- Weight: 80 kg (176 lb)
Medal record
Men's volleyball
Representing Spain
Mediterranean Games
Silver medal – second place	2009 Pescara	Team

José Alexis Valido Moreno (born March 9, 1976) is a Spanish volleyball player who represented his native country at the 2000 Summer Olympics in Sydney, Australia. There he finished ninth place with the Men's National Team.
