= Santiago Darraidou =

Argentine volleyball player

Personal information
- Full name: Santiago Pedro Darraidou
- Born: November 24, 1980 (age 45); Buenos Aires, Argentina
- Height: 1.94 m (6 ft 4 in)
- Weight: 96 kg (212 lb)

Volleyball information
- Position: Outside hitter
- Current club: (Argentina) CA Sarmiento (R)
- Number: 13

National team
2002-	Argentina

Santiago Pedro Darraidou (born November 24, 1980) is an Argentine volleyball player. Darraidou is 194 cm and weighs 96 kg. He speaks Spanish, English and Italian.

== Clubs ==
Club	Country	Season
Koyote Salta	Argentina	2001-2002
Kerakoll Modena	Italy	2002-2003
Orestiada	Greece	2003-2004
Fenerbahçe	Turkey	2004-2005
Bolivar	Argentina	2005-2006
Sport Club Ulbra	Brazil	2006-2007
Alexandroupoli	Greece	2007-2008
Meram Belediye	Turkey	2007-2008
Unicaja Almeria	Spain	2007-2008
Olio Pignatelli Isernia	Italy	2008-2009
AEK Athens	Greece	2009-2010
Globo Sora	Italy	2010-2011
MSM Bella Vista	Argentina	2011-2012
CA Sarmiento (R)	Argentina	2012-2013

== International Caps Argentina ==
Tournament	Year	Final Position
FIVB World League	2002	9th Place
FIVB World Championship	2002	6th Place
Olympic Games	2004	5th Place
FIVB World League	2005	10th Place
FIVB America's Cup	2005	4th Place

== Titles and awards ==
- 2005 - Best blocker FIVB America's Cup
