= Lucas Chávez (volleyball) =

Argentine volleyball player (born 1982)

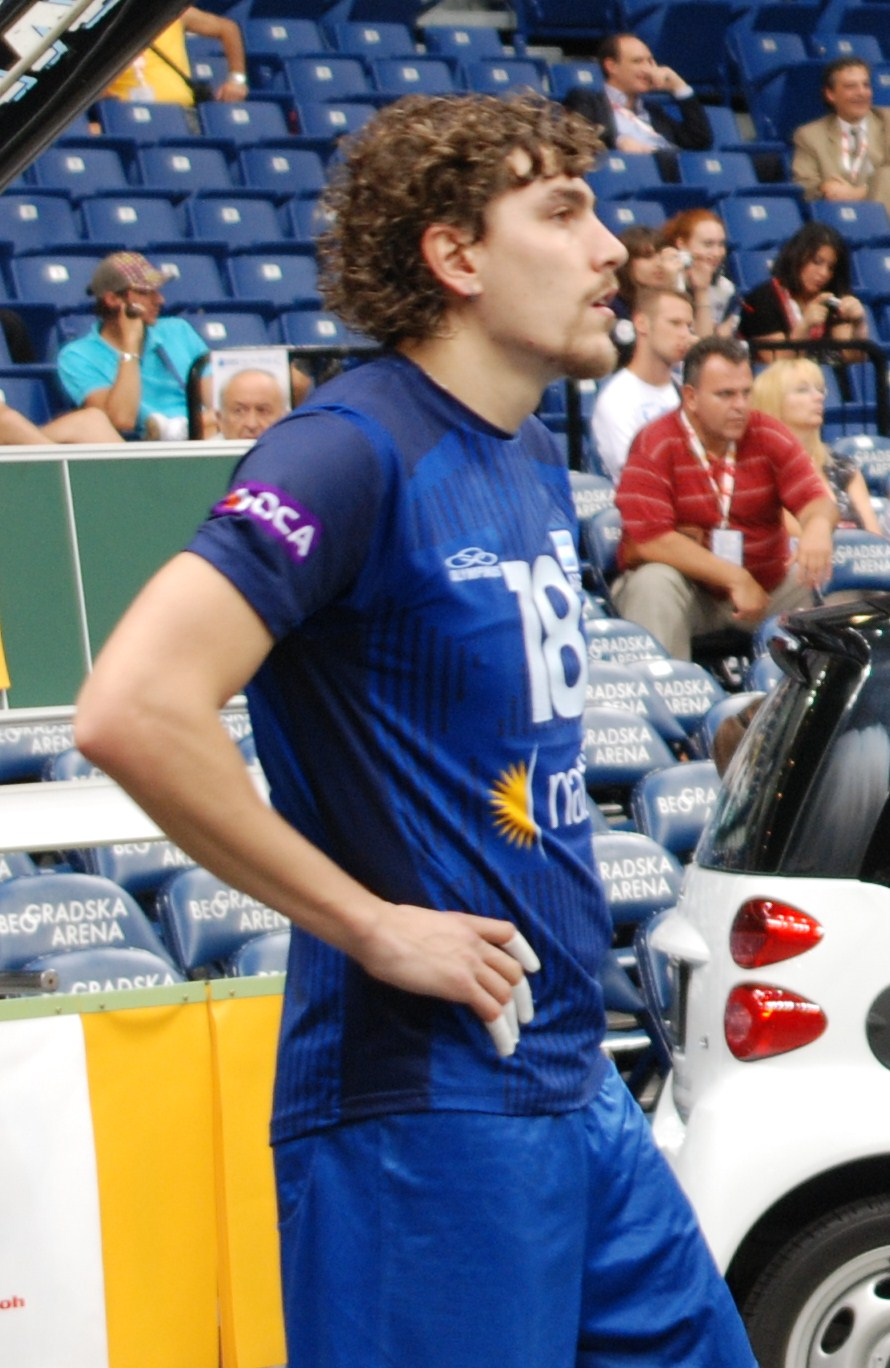
- Chávez in 2009

Personal information
- Full name: Lucas Matías Chávez
- Born: 3 April 1982 (age 44); Buenos Aires, Argentina
- Height: 1.99 m (6 ft 6 in)
- Weight: 95 kg (209 lb)
- Spike: 348 cm (137 in)
- Block: 328 cm (129 in)

Volleyball information
- Position: Wing-Spiker
- Current club: Anorthosis Famagusta
- Number: 18

National team
2007–	Argentina

Lucas Matías Chávez (born 3 April 1982 in Buenos Aires) is an Argentine volleyball player of Cyprus powerhouse Anorthosis Famagusta and Argentina men's national volleyball team. Chávez is 199 cm and weighs 95 kg.

He started his career with Club Italiano in Argentina and also played with Guaynabo Mets in Puerto Rico (2009–10) and Fenerbahçe Istanbul (2006–07) in Turkey and Hypo Tirol Innsbruck in Austria (2003–04). He was selected European Top Teams Cup Best Scorer in 2004 when he was playing for Innsbruck.
