= Hernán Ferraro =

Argentine volleyball player (born 1968)

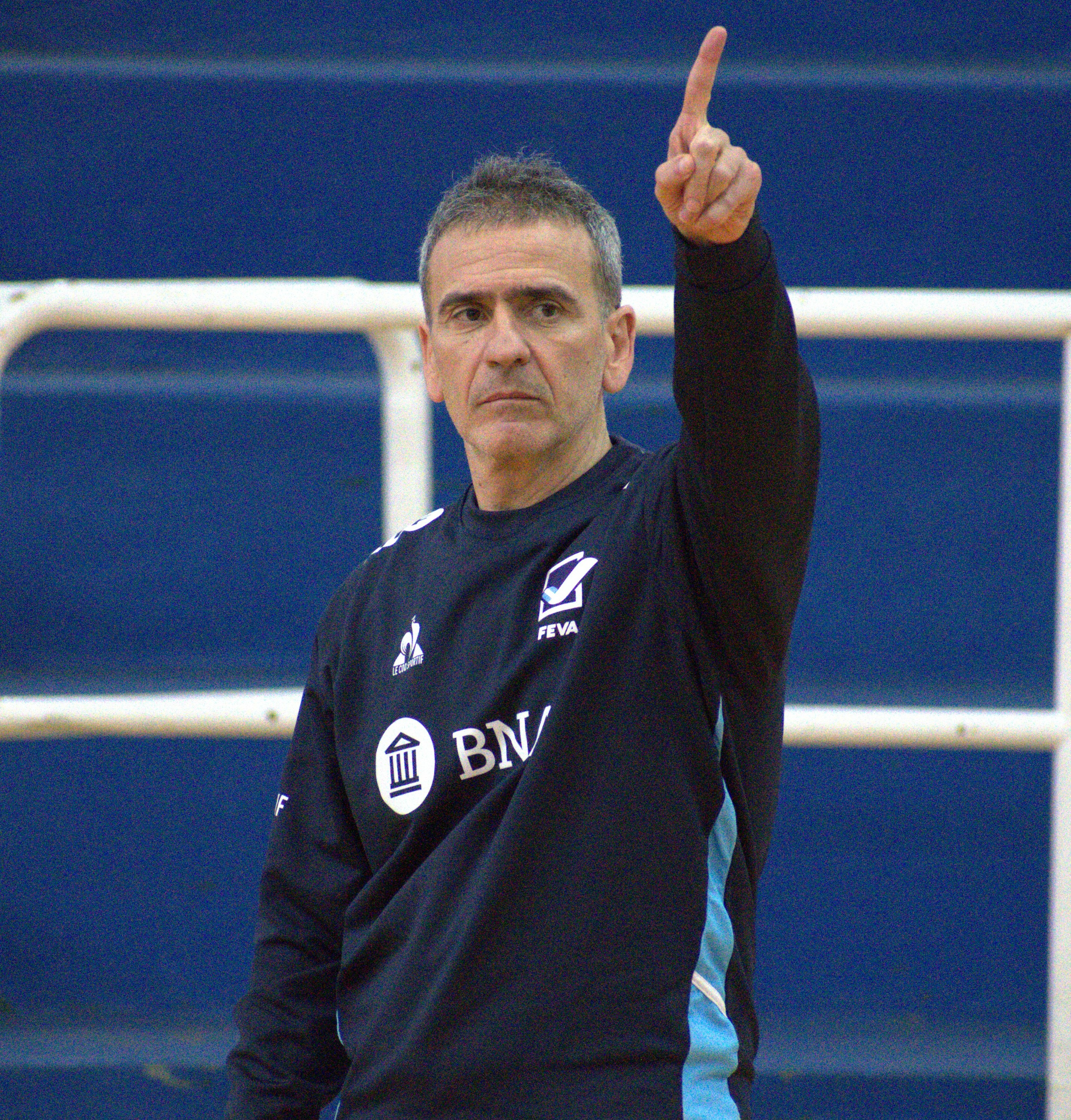
- Ferraro in 2022

Personal information
- Full name: Hernán Josue Ferraro
- Nationality: Argentine
- Born: 13 May 1968 (age 58); Buenos Aires
- Height: 1.71 m (5 ft 7 in)
- Weight: 74 kg (163 lb)
- Spike: 300 cm (120 in)
- Block: 300 cm (120 in)

Volleyball information
- Number: 8

Career
Years	Teams
2004	(Argentina) Azul; Rojas Scholem; Náutico Hacoaj; Rosario Sonder; Boca JRS

National team
2004	Argentina

Hernán Ferraro (born 13 May 1968) is an Argentine male former volleyball player. He was part of the Argentina men's national volleyball team. He competed with the national team at the 2004 Summer Olympics in Athens, Greece. He played with Rojas Scholem in 2004. After retiring, he took several coaching jobs before becoming the principal coach of the Argentina women's national volleyball team in 2018.

== Clubs ==
- (Argentina) Rojas Scholem (2004)

== See also ==
- Argentina at the 2004 Summer Olympics
