= Nikolaos Roumeliotis =

Greek volleyball player (born 1978)

Nikos Roumeliotis
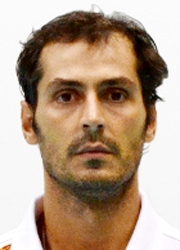

Personal information
- Nationality: Greek
- Born: 12 October 1978 (age 48); Sydney, Australia
- Hometown: Patras, Greece
- Height: 2.01 m (6 ft 7 in)
- Weight: 97 kg (214 lb)
- Spike: 343 cm (135 in)
- Block: 320 cm (130 in)

Career
Years	Teams
1995–2001; 2001–2002; 2002–2006; 2006–2009; 2009–2011; 2011–2012; 2012–2018; 2018–2019	(Greece) E.A. Patras (Italy) Alimenti Sardi Cagliari (Greece) E.A. Patras (Greece) Olympiacos Piraeus (Greece) Aris Thessaloniki (Italy) Acqua Paradiso Monza Brianza (Greece) Panachaiki (Greece) Pamvohaikos

National team
Greece

Nikolaos Roumeliotis (Greek: Νίκος Ρουμελιώτης; born 12 October 1978) is a retired Greek male volleyball player. He was part of the Greece men's national volleyball team. He competed with the national team at the 2004 Summer Olympics in Athens, Greece.

== Personal ==
Roumeliotis is married to the former volleyball player Vasso Karantasiou, and they have one son.

== See also ==
- Greece at the 2004 Summer Olympics
