= David Ferguson (volleyball) =

Australian volleyball player (born 1982)

Personal information
- Nationality: Australian
- Born: 13 March 1982 (age 44)
- Height: 2.05 m (6 ft 9 in)
- Weight: 92 kg (203 lb)
- Spike: 348 cm (137 in)
- Block: 328 cm (129 in)

Volleyball information
- Number: 13

Career
Years	Teams
2004	(Netherlands) Lycurgus

National team
2004	Australia

David Ferguson (born 13 March 1982) is a former Australian male volleyball player. He was part of the Australia men's national volleyball team. He competed with the national team at the 2004 Summer Olympics in Athens, Greece. He played with Lycurgus in 2004.

== Clubs ==
- (Australia) Canberra Heat (2002)
- (Netherlands) Lycurgus (2004)

== See also ==
- Australia at the 2004 Summer Olympics
