= Oliver Kieffer =

French volleyball player (born 1979)

Medal record

Representing France

Men's Volleyball

World Championships
Bronze medal – third place	Argentina 2002	Team

European Championships
Silver medal – second place	2003 Germany	Team
Silver medal – second place	2009 Turkey	Team

World League
Silver medal – second place	2006 Moscow	Team

Oliver Kieffer (born August 27, 1979 in Nanterre, Hauts-de-Seine) is a French volleyball player, who won the bronze medal with the France men's national volleyball team at the 2002 World Championships. Standing at 200 m, he plays as a middle-blocker.
