= Javier González Panton =

Cuban volleyball player (born 1983)

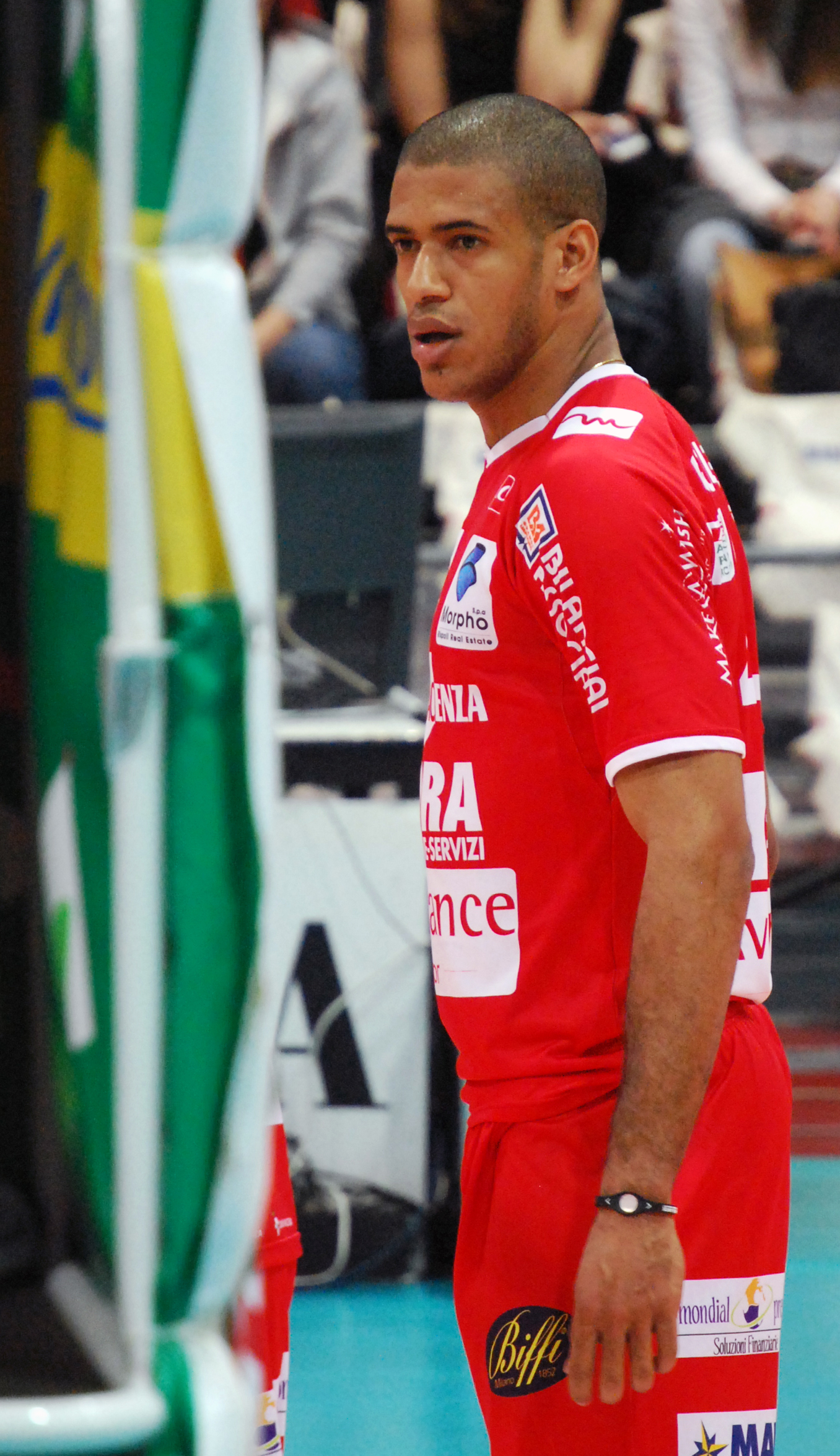

Personal information
- Nationality: Cuban
- Born: 21 January 1983 (age 43)
- Height: 193 cm (6 ft 4 in)
- Weight: 80 kg (176 lb)
- Spike: 358 cm (141 in)
- Block: 330 cm (130 in)

Volleyball information
- Number: 15

Career
Years	Teams
2018-	Montpellier (LAM)

National team
2002-2005	Cuba

Javier González Panton (born 21 April 1983) is a Cuban male volleyball player. He was part of the Cuba men's national volleyball team at the 2002 FIVB Volleyball Men's World Championship in Argentina. He played for ASUL Lyon, CVB52 Chaumont. His actual club is the MVUC Montpellier in France.

== Clubs ==
- ASUL Lyon (2014–2016)
- CVB52HM CHaumont(2016–2018)
- MVUC Montpellier (2018-)
