= Gustavo Porporatto =

Argentine volleyball player (born 1981)

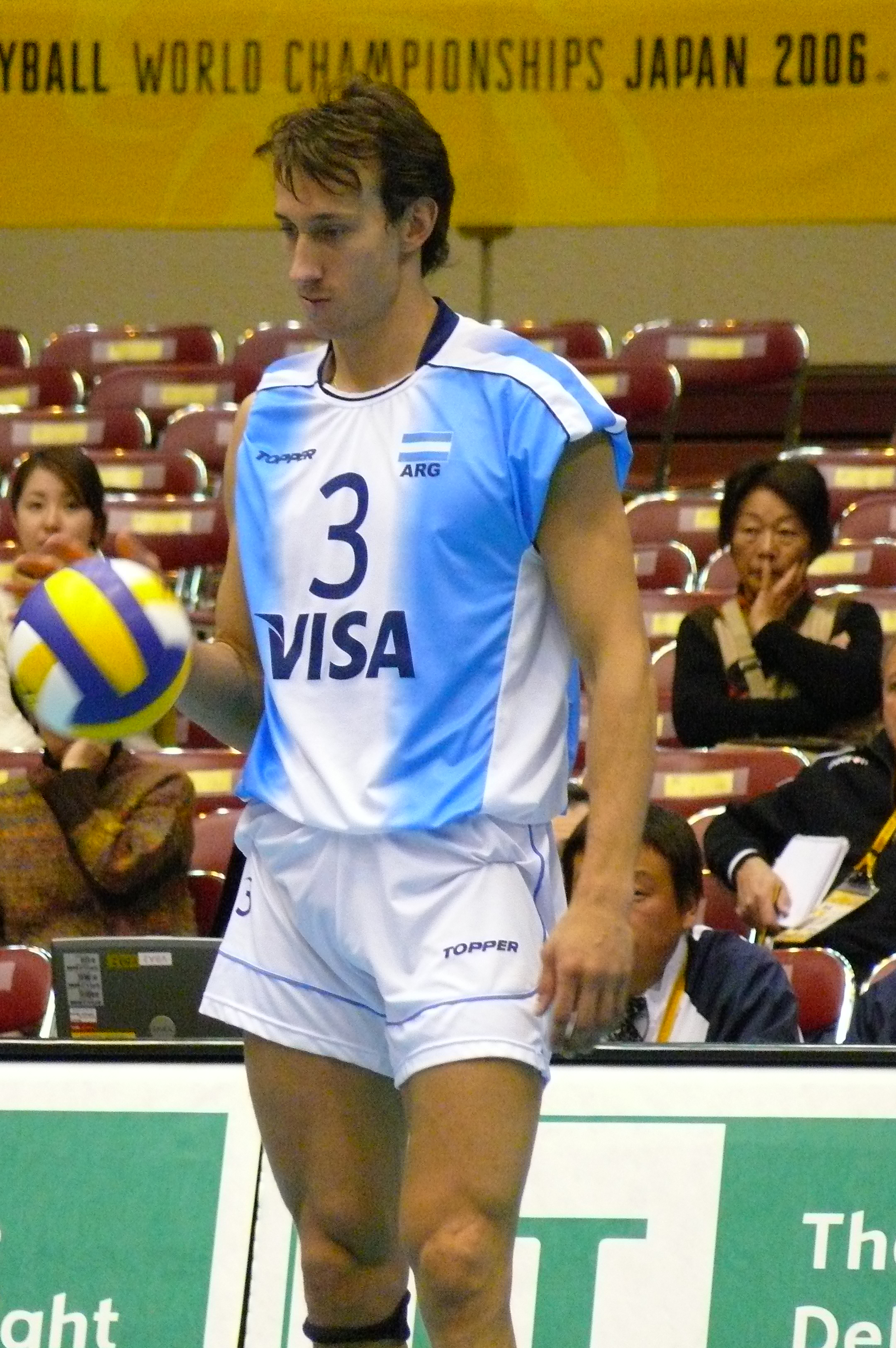

Personal information
- Full name: Gustavo Federico Porporatto
- Nickname: "Porpo"
- Born: 7 May 1981 (age 45); Argentina
- Hometown: Córdoba
- Height: 1.99 m (6 ft 6 in)
- Weight: 95 kg (209 lb)
- Spike: 363 cm (143 in)
- Block: 337 cm (133 in)

Volleyball information
- Position: central
- Number: 3

Career
Teams
	1998-2016

National team
1999-2014	Argentina

Gustavo Federico Porporatto Is an Argentine former male volleyball player. He was part of the Argentina men's national volleyball team. He competed with the national team at the 2004 Summer Olympics in Athens (Greece), the Men's World Championship 2002 in Argentine, the Men's World Championship 2006 in Japán and the Men's world Championship 2014 in Poland.

== Clubs ==
- -1998/1999: Club Municipalidad (Córdoba)
- -1999/2000: Club Ciudad (Buenos Aires)
- -2000/2001: Club Scholem Aleijem (Buenos Aires)
- -2001/2002: Club Rojas Scholem (Buenos Aires)
- -2002/2003: Club Rojas Scholem (Buenos Aires)
- -2003/2004: Club Budvanska Rivijera (Serbia y Montenegro)
- -2003/2004: Club Swiss Medical Monteros (Tucumán)
- -2004/2005: Club Numancia Caja Duero (España)
- -2005/2006: Club Son Amar Palma (España)
- -2006/2007: Club Stade Poitiers (Francia)
- -2007/2008: Club Atlético Belgrano (Córdoba)
- -2008/2009: Club Atlético Belgrano (Córdoba)
- -2009/2010: UPCN Voley Club (San Juan)
- -2010/2011: UPCN Voley Club (San Juan)
- -2012/2013: Club Olimpo (Bahía Blanca)
- -2013/2014: Club La Unión (Formosa)
- -2014/2015: Club Lomas Voley (Buenos Aires)
- -2015/2016: Club La Unión (Formosa)
