= Hristo Zlatanov =

Bulgarian-Italian volleyball player

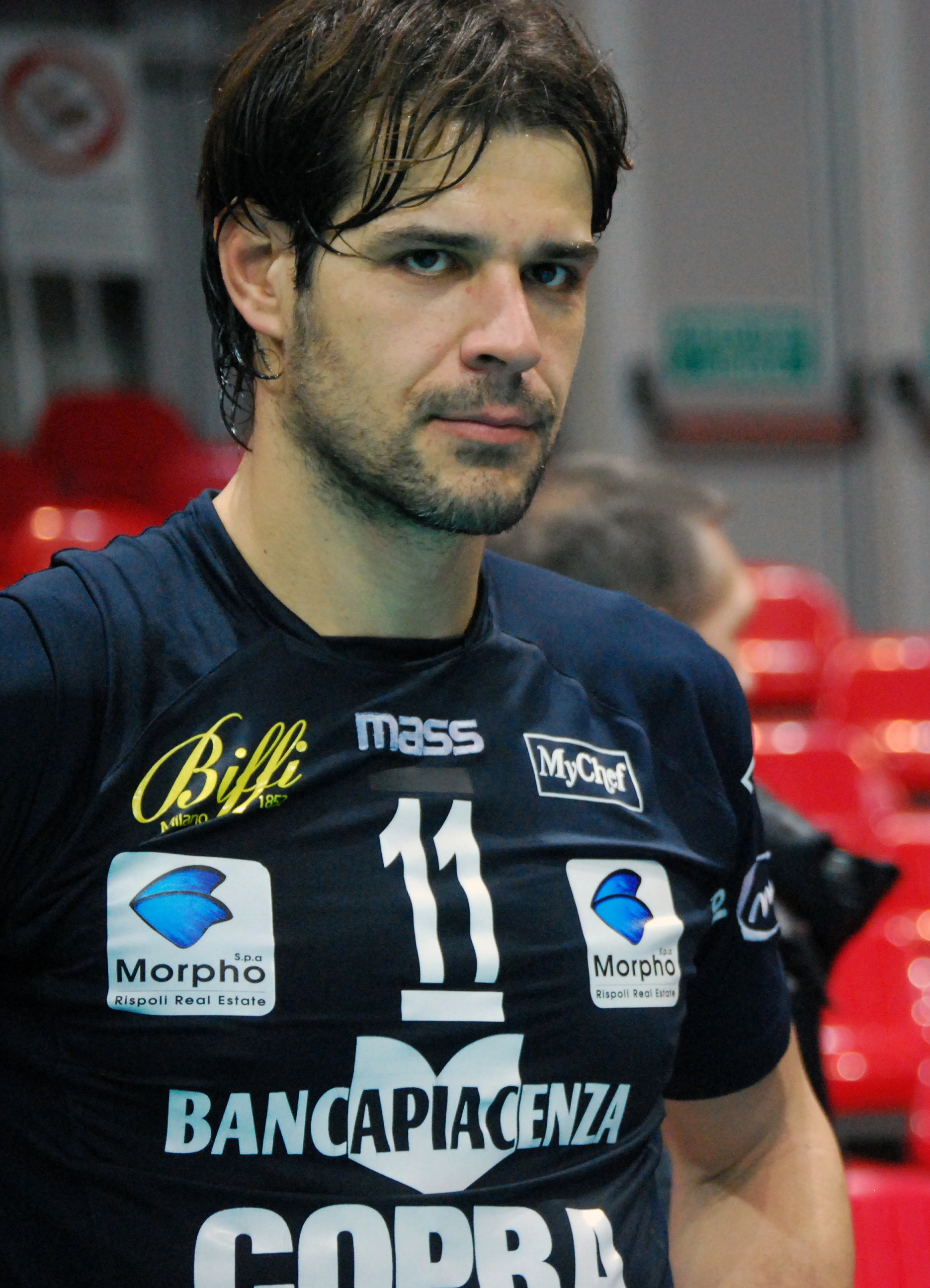

Personal information
- Nationality: Bulgarian; Italian
- Born: 21 April 1976 (age 50); Sofia, Bulgaria
- Height: 2.01 m (6 ft 7 in)
- Weight: 103 kg (227 lb)
- Spike: 355 cm (140 in)
- Block: 315 cm (124 in)

Volleyball information
- Position: Outside hitter/Opposite
- Number: 11

Career
Years	Teams
1993–1994; 1994–1997; 1997–1998; 1998–2000; 2000–2003; 2003–2017	Gonzaga Milano; Porto Ravenna; Roma Volley; Palermo Volley; Volley Milano; LPR Piacenza

National team
1997–2008	Italy
Honours
Men's volleyball
Representing Italy
World League
Gold medal – first place	1997 Moscow
Gold medal – first place	1999 Mar del Plata
Silver medal – second place	2003 Madrid
Silver medal – second place	2004 Rome
- Last updated: 3 January 2018

Hristo Dimitrov Zlatanov (Bulgarian: Христо Златанов - born 21 April 1976) is a Bulgarian-Italian former volleyball player who played on the Italian national volleyball team. He participated in the 2008 Summer Olympics in Beijing, China.

== Personal life ==
Zlatanov is the son of the legendary Bulgarian volleyball player Dimitar Zlatanov. In 2024, his son Manuel Hristov Zlatanov became FIVB U-17 World Champion with the Italian U-17 Volleybal National Team.
