= Dan Howard =

Australian volleyball player (born 1976)

Personal information
- Nationality: Australian
- Born: 13 December 1976 (age 49)
- Height: 2.08 m (6 ft 10 in)
- Weight: 98 kg (216 lb)
- Spike: 375 cm (148 in)
- Block: 340 cm (130 in)

Volleyball information
- Number: 1

Career
Years	Teams
2004	(Italy) Marmi Lanza Verona

National team
2000–2004	Australia

Daniel Howard (born 13 December 1976) is a former Australian male volleyball player. He was part of the Australia men's national volleyball team. He competed with the national team at the 2000 Summer Olympics in Sydney, Australia and at the 2004 Summer Olympics in Athens, Greece. He played with Marmi Lanza Verona in 2004.

== Clubs ==
- (Italy) Marmi Lanza Verona (2004)

== See also ==
- Australia at the 2000 Summer Olympics
- Australia at the 2004 Summer Olympics
- 3 x World Championships in 1998, 2002 and 2006
