= Krasimir Gaydarski =

Bulgarian volleyball player (born 1983)

Personal information
- Nationality: Bulgarian
- Born: 23 February 1983 (age 43)
- Height: 2.04 m (6 ft 8 in)
- Weight: 98 kg (216 lb)

National team
Bulgaria

Krasimir Gaydarski or Krasimir Gajdarski (Bulgarian: Красимир Гайдарски; born 23 February 1983) is a Bulgarian male volleyball player. He was part of the Bulgaria men's national volleyball team. He competed with the national team at the 2008 Summer Olympics in Beijing, China. He played with Olympiacos in 2008.

== Clubs ==
- 2003-2007 (Bulgaria) Levski Sofia
- 2007-2009 (Greece) Olympiacos S.C.
- 2009-2010 (Germany) SCC Berlin
- 2010 (Russia) Neftyanik Orenburg
- 2011-2012 (Iran) Kalleh Mazandaran
- 2012-2013 (Bulgaria) Levski Volley

== See also ==
- Bulgaria at the 2008 Summer Olympics
