= Andrew Earl (volleyball) =

Australian volleyball player (born 1982)

Personal information
- Nationality: Australian
- Born: 15 September 1982 (age 44)
- Height: 1.96 m (6 ft 5 in)
- Weight: 85 kg (187 lb)
- Spike: 336 cm (132 in)
- Block: 322 cm (127 in)

Volleyball information
- Number: 9

Career
Years	Teams
2004	(Spain) Vigo

National team
2004	Australia

Andrew Earl (born 15 September 1982) is a former Australian male volleyball player. He was part of the Australia men's national volleyball team. He competed with the national team at the 2004 Summer Olympics in Athens, Greece. He played with Vigo in 2004.

== Clubs ==
- (Spain) Vigo (2004)

== See also ==
- Australia at the 2004 Summer Olympics
