= Matthew Young (volleyball) =

Australian volleyball player (born 1981)

Personal information
- Nationality: Australian
- Born: 17 July 1981 (age 45)
- Height: 1.87 m (6 ft 2 in)
- Weight: 78 kg (172 lb)
- Spike: 335 cm (132 in)
- Block: 323 cm (127 in)

Volleyball information
- Number: 7

Career
Years	Teams
2004	(Spain) Jusam-Electronics

National team
2004	Australia

Matthew Young (born 17 July 1981) is a former Australian male volleyball player. He was part of the Australia men's national volleyball team. He competed with the national team at the 2004 Summer Olympics in Athens, Greece. He played with Jusam-Electronics in 2004. He now works as head of volleyball at Brisbane Grammar School

== Clubs ==
- (Spain) Jusam-Electronics (2004)

== See also ==
- Australia at the 2004 Summer Olympics
