= Luke Campbell (volleyball) =

Australian volleyball player (born 1979)

Personal information
- Nationality: Australian
- Born: 8 November 1979 (age 46)
- Height: 2.02 m (6 ft 8 in)
- Weight: 98 kg (216 lb)
- Spike: 346 cm (136 in)
- Block: 335 cm (132 in)

Volleyball information
- Number: 5

Career
| Years | Teams |
|---|---|
| 2004 | (Germany) SV Bayer Wuppertal |

National team
| 2004 | Australia |

Luke Campbell (born 8 November 1979) is a former Australian male volleyball player. He was part of the Australia men's national volleyball team. He competed with the national team at the 2004 Summer Olympics in Athens, Greece. He played with SV Bayer Wuppertal in 2004.

== Clubs ==
- (Germany) SV Bayer Wuppertal (2004)

== See also ==
- Australia at the 2004 Summer Olympics
