= Gastón Giani =

Argentine volleyball player (born 1979)

Personal information
- Nationality: Argentine
- Born: 26 April 1979 (age 47)
- Height: 1.94 m (6 ft 4 in)
- Weight: 86 kg (190 lb)
- Spike: 345 cm (136 in)
- Block: 330 cm (130 in)

Volleyball information
- Number: 18

Career
Years	Teams
2002-2005	(Spain) Tenerife
2005-2008	(Turkey) Izmir

National team
2002-2014	Argentina

Gastón Giani (born 26 April 1979) is a former Argentine male volleyball player. He was part of the Argentina men's national volleyball team. He competed with the national team at the 2004 Summer Olympics in Athens, Greece. He played with Tenerife in 2002-2005 and with Izmir in 2005–2008.

== Clubs ==
- (Spain) Tenerife (2002–2005)
- (Turkey) Izmir (2005–2008)

== See also ==
- Argentina at the 2004 Summer Olympics
