= Brett Alderman =

Australian volleyball player (born 1977)

Personal information
- Nationality: Australian
- Born: 12 December 1977 (age 48)
- Height: 1.91 m (6 ft 3 in)
- Weight: 87 kg (192 lb)
- Spike: 343 cm (135 in)
- Block: 328 cm (129 in)

Volleyball information
- Number: 18

Career
Years	Teams
2004	(Germany) TSV Unterhaching

National team
2004	Australia

Brett Norman Wells Alderman (born 12 December 1977) is a former Australian male volleyball player. He was part of the Australia men's national volleyball team. He competed with the national team at the 2004 Summer Olympics in Athens, Greece. He played with TSV Unterhaching in 2004.

== Clubs ==
- (Germany) TSV Unterhaching (2004)

== See also ==
- Australia at the 2004 Summer Olympics
