= 2003 FIVB Volleyball Men's World Cup squads =

This article shows all participating team squads at the 2003 FIVB Volleyball Men's World Cup, held from November 16 to November 29, 2003 in several cities in Japan.

== Brazil ==
- Head Coach: Bernardo Rezende

| # | Name | Date of Birth | Height | Weight | Spike | Block |
|---|---|---|---|---|---|---|
| 3 | Giovane Gávio | 07.09.1970 | 196 | 89 | 340 | 322 |
| 4 | André Heller | 17.12.1975 | 199 | 93 | 339 | 321 |
| 6 | Maurício Lima | 27.01.1968 | 184 | 79 | 321 | 304 |
| 7 | Giba | 23.12.1976 | 192 | 85 | 325 | 312 |
| 9 | André Nascimento | 04.03.1979 | 195 | 95 | 340 | 320 |
| 10 | Sérgio Dutra Santos | 15.10.1975 | 184 | 78 | 325 | 310 |
| 11 | Anderson Rodrigues | 21.05.1974 | 190 | 95 | 330 | 321 |
| 12 | Nalbert Bittencourt (c) | 09.03.1974 | 195 | 82 | 329 | 309 |
| 13 | Gustavo Endres | 23.08.1975 | 203 | 98 | 337 | 325 |
| 14 | Rodrigo Santana | 17.04.1979 | 205 | 85 | 350 | 328 |
| 17 | Ricardo Garcia | 19.11.1975 | 191 | 89 | 337 | 320 |
| 18 | Dante Amaral | 30.09.1980 | 201 | 86 | 345 | 327 |

== Canada ==
- Head Coach: Stelio DeRocco

| # | Name | Date of Birth | Height | Weight | Spike | Block |
|---|---|---|---|---|---|---|
| 1 | Douglas Bruce | 07.05.1974 | 197 | 94 | 345 | 320 |
| 5 | Lucas Snider | 06.08.1977 | 183 | 93 | 334 | 319 |
| 6 | Sebastien Ruette | 22.06.1977 | 200 | 95 | 362 | 328 |
| 7 | Jason Haldane | 23.07.1971 | 203 | 102 | 355 | 325 |
| 8 | Scott Koskie (c) | 14.12.1971 | 190 | 85 | 330 | 312 |
| 9 | Paul Duerden | 22.10.1974 | 195 | 98 | 358 | 320 |
| 10 | Brett Youngberg | 15.09.1979 | 204 | 97 | 357 | 333 |
| 11 | Steve Brinkman | 12.01.1978 | 202 | 92 | 352 | 320 |
| 12 | Chris Wolfenden | 22.06.1977 | 194 | 94 | 341 | 321 |
| 13 | Ross Ballard | 14.11.1972 | 195 | 95 | 342 | 322 |
| 14 | Murray Grapentine | 24.08.1977 | 202 | 98 | 359 | 334 |
| 15 | Fred Winters | 25.09.1982 | 198 | 95 | 359 | 327 |

== China ==
- Head Coach: Di Anhe

| # | Name | Date of Birth | Height | Weight | Spike | Block |
|---|---|---|---|---|---|---|
| 1 | Zhang Xiaodong | 22.11.1979 | 203 | 75 | 350 | 341 |
| 2 | Hu Song | 21.02.1983 | 198 | 75 | 350 | 340 |
| 4 | Yuan Zhi | 29.09.1981 | 195 | 88 | 348 | 334 |
| 6 | Cui Xiaodong | 17.11.1980 | 205 | 80 | 355 | 345 |
| 7 | Tang Miao | 04.05.1982 | 204 | 85 | 355 | 345 |
| 8 | Shi Hairong (c) | 27.03.1977 | 192 | 75 | 350 | 336 |
| 9 | He Jiong | 16.02.1977 | 188 | 76 | 342 | 332 |
| 10 | Li Hang | 03.02.1979 | 203 | 89 | 360 | 343 |
| 11 | Li Chun | 01.04.1982 | 190 | 82 | 348 | 332 |
| 12 | Shen Qiong | 05.09.1981 | 198 | 84 | 359 | 349 |
| 13 | Wu Xiaojiang | 07.03.1978 | 197 | 86 | 357 | 336 |
| 15 | Chu Hui | 11.02.1981 | 187 | 70 | 355 | 323 |

== Egypt ==
- Head Coach: Veselin Vuković

| # | Name | Date of Birth | Height | Weight | Spike | Block |
|---|---|---|---|---|---|---|
| 1 | Hamdy Awad El-Safy (c) | 14.04.1972 | 202 | 105 | 346 | 327 |
| 2 | Youssef Saleh | 25.07.1982 | 191 | 85 | 342 | 338 |
| 4 | Mohamed Shehata | 25.02.1975 | 193 | 98 | 337 | 325 |
| 5 | Ossama Kemsan | 12.01.1977 | 192 | 72 | 335 | 326 |
| 6 | Wael El-Aydy | 08.12.1971 | 178 | 76 | 0 | 0 |
| 7 | Ashraf El-Hassan | 17.05.1975 | 184 | 84 | 326 | 318 |
| 8 | Mohamed Awad Eslam | 05.08.1976 | 192 | 88 | 335 | 324 |
| 9 | Mohamed El-Mahdy | 02.09.1978 | 196 | 95 | 340 | 335 |
| 11 | Mohamed Moselhy | 07.01.1972 | 183 | 85 | 334 | 326 |
| 13 | Weal Said | 06.01.1979 | 202 | 87 | 345 | 337 |
| 14 | Abdelnaeim Salah | 19.08.1984 | 197 | 84 | 342 | 332 |
| 18 | Mahmoud Hassona | 03.11.1972 | 198 | 100 | 334 | 325 |

== France ==
- Head Coach: Philippe Blain

| # | Name | Date of Birth | Height | Weight | Spike | Block |
|---|---|---|---|---|---|---|
| 2 | Hubert Henno | 06.10.1976 | 188 | 83 | 330 | 310 |
| 3 | Dominique Daquin (c) | 10.11.1972 | 197 | 85 | 352 | 325 |
| 6 | Jean-Charles Monneraye | 25.08.1980 | 209 | 103 | 356 | 332 |
| 7 | Stéphane Antiga | 03.02.1976 | 200 | 94 | 344 | 321 |
| 8 | Laurent Capet | 05.05.1972 | 202 | 92 | 350 | 325 |
| 9 | Frantz Granvorka | 10.03.1976 | 195 | 90 | 364 | 327 |
| 11 | Loïc De Kergret | 20.08.1970 | 193 | 89 | 335 | 315 |
| 13 | Marc Schalk | 03.12.1973 | 197 | 85 | 350 | 325 |
| 14 | Philippe Barça-Cysique | 22.04.1977 | 194 | 88 | 347 | 325 |
| 16 | Mathias Patin | 25.04.1974 | 185 | 73 | 325 | 315 |
| 17 | Oliver Kieffer | 27.08.1979 | 200 | 85 | 355 | 335 |
| 18 | Sébastien Frangolacci | 31.03.1976 | 192 | 88 | 340 | 322 |

== Italy ==
- Head Coach: Gian Paolo Montali

| # | Name | Date of Birth | Height | Weight | Spike | Block |
|---|---|---|---|---|---|---|
| 1 | Luigi Mastrangelo | 17.08.1975 | 202 | 90 | 368 | 336 |
| 2 | Marco Meoni | 25.05.1973 | 197 | 86 | 338 | 313 |
| 5 | Valerio Vermiglio | 01.03.1976 | 189 | 86 | 315 | 300 |
| 6 | Samuele Papi | 20.05.1973 | 190 | 84 | 345 | 308 |
| 7 | Andrea Sartoretti | 19.06.1971 | 194 | 88 | 353 | 319 |
| 8 | Alberto Cisolla | 10.10.1977 | 197 | 86 | 367 | 345 |
| 10 | Luca Tencati | 16.03.1979 | 200 | 90 | 365 | 352 |
| 12 | Damiano Pippi | 23.08.1971 | 194 | 86 | 341 | 311 |
| 13 | Andrea Giani (c) | 22.04.1970 | 196 | 97 | 356 | 322 |
| 16 | Francesco Biribanti | 17.01.1976 | 201 | 94 | 360 | 340 |
| 17 | Paolo Cozzi | 26.05.1980 | 200 | 86 | 363 | 328 |
| 18 | Matej Černič | 13.09.1978 | 192 | 80 | 354 | 335 |

== Japan ==
- Head Coach: Mikiyasu Tanaka

| # | Name | Date of Birth | Height | Weight | Spike | Block |
|---|---|---|---|---|---|---|
| 2 | Daisuke Usami | 29.03.1979 | 184 | 82 | 339 | 325 |
| 3 | Nobuhiro Ito | 04.11.1977 | 200 | 85 | 350 | 340 |
| 4 | Nobuyoshi Hosokawa | 17.05.1973 | 191 | 87 | 340 | 320 |
| 5 | Kenji Onoue | 12.05.1978 | 199 | 79 | 345 | 340 |
| 6 | Atsushi Kobayashi | 10.03.1974 | 194 | 92 | 335 | 318 |
| 8 | Katsutoshi Tsumagari | 02.11.1975 | 183 | 75 | 322 | 310 |
| 9 | Takehiro Kihara | 13.09.1974 | 193 | 82 | 338 | 328 |
| 11 | Yoichi Kato (c) | 12.08.1976 | 190 | 82 | 347 | 329 |
| 14 | Takahiro Yamamoto | 12.07.1978 | 200 | 87 | 345 | 330 |
| 16 | Ryu Morishige | 18.07.1980 | 191 | 83 | 346 | 330 |
| 17 | Yuta Abe | 08.08.1981 | 192 | 78 | 335 | 322 |
| 18 | Akira Koshiya | 12.06.1979 | 190 | 73 | 335 | 320 |

== Serbia and Montenegro ==
- Head Coach: Ljubomir Travica

| # | Name | Date of Birth | Height | Weight | Spike | Block |
|---|---|---|---|---|---|---|
| 3 | Goran Marić | 02.11.1981 | 204 | 87 | 344 | 327 |
| 4 | Bojan Janić | 11.03.1982 | 198 | 83 | 345 | 322 |
| 6 | Slobodan Boškan | 18.08.1975 | 197 | 87 | 343 | 320 |
| 8 | Vasa Mijić | 11.04.1973 | 186 | 80 | 332 | 307 |
| 9 | Nikola Grbić (c) | 06.09.1973 | 194 | 91 | 346 | 320 |
| 10 | Vladimir Grbić | 14.12.1970 | 193 | 87 | 360 | 350 |
| 11 | Novica Bjelica | 09.02.1983 | 202 | 97 | 343 | 324 |
| 12 | Andrija Gerić | 24.01.1977 | 203 | 101 | 350 | 323 |
| 13 | Goran Vujević | 27.02.1973 | 192 | 94 | 339 | 315 |
| 14 | Ivan Miljković | 13.09.1979 | 206 | 88 | 354 | 333 |
| 15 | Ivan Ilić | 19.12.1976 | 194 | 85 | 337 | 318 |
| 18 | Igor Vusurović | 24.09.1974 | 200 | 86 | 342 | 323 |

== South Korea ==
- Head Coach: Cha Joo-Hyun

| # | Name | Date of Birth | Height | Weight | Spike | Block |
|---|---|---|---|---|---|---|
| 1 | Ko Hee-Jin | 13.07.1980 | 200 | 90 | 330 | 320 |
| 4 | Chang Kwang-Kyun | 14.03.1981 | 190 | 81 | 321 | 312 |
| 5 | Yeo Oh-Hyun | 02.09.1978 | 175 | 66 | 268 | 266 |
| 6 | Choi Tae-Woong (c) | 09.04.1976 | 185 | 78 | 330 | 317 |
| 9 | Shin Sun-Ho | 28.05.1978 | 195 | 80 | 318 | 316 |
| 10 | Lee Sun-Kyu | 14.03.1981 | 202 | 87 | 325 | 320 |
| 12 | Yoon Kwan-Yeol | 10.01.1978 | 198 | 97 | 337 | 334 |
| 13 | Kim Young-Rae | 28.07.1981 | 193 | 80 | 320 | 311 |
| 14 | Suk Jin-Wook | 05.12.1976 | 186 | 73 | 320 | 312 |
| 15 | Lee Hyung-Doo | 11.05.1980 | 190 | 76 | 313 | 311 |
| 16 | Shin Young-Soo | 01.07.1982 | 200 | 90 | 300 | 290 |
| 18 | Chang Byung-Chul | 15.08.1976 | 195 | 85 | 325 | 316 |

== Tunisia ==
- Head Coach: Antonio Giacobbe

| # | Name | Date of Birth | Height | Weight | Spike | Block |
|---|---|---|---|---|---|---|
| 2 | Mohamed Trabelsi | 15.09.1981 | 202 | 92 | 340 | 320 |
| 3 | Mehdi Gara | 01.03.1981 | 189 | 78 | 332 | 317 |
| 5 | Samir Sellami | 13.07.1977 | 194 | 82 | 320 | 308 |
| 7 | Chaker Ghezal | 14.01.1977 | 199 | 90 | 352 | 335 |
| 9 | Khaled Belaïd | 30.12.1973 | 195 | 82 | 326 | 312 |
| 10 | Oualid Ben Abbes | 19.06.1980 | 186 | 76 | 331 | 308 |
| 11 | Marouan Fehri | 01.07.1979 | 197 | 79 | 325 | 306 |
| 13 | Noureddine Hfaiedh | 27.08.1973 | 200 | 86 | 350 | 315 |
| 14 | Mehrez Berriri | 13.04.1975 | 186 | 80 | 328 | 305 |
| 15 | Ghazi Guidara (c) | 18.05.1974 | 186 | 75 | 326 | 305 |
| 16 | Tarek Sammari | 01.01.1978 | 192 | 82 | 328 | 312 |
| 18 | Hosni Karamosly | 01.06.1980 | 197 | 82 | 338 | 315 |

== United States ==
- Head Coach: Doug Beal

| # | Name | Date of Birth | Height | Weight | Spike | Block |
|---|---|---|---|---|---|---|
| 1 | Lloy Ball (c) | 17.02.1972 | 203 | 95 | 351 | 316 |
| 5 | Erik Sullivan | 09.08.1972 | 193 | 86 | 340 | 320 |
| 7 | Donald Suxho | 21.02.1976 | 196 | 100 | 349 | 329 |
| 8 | William Priddy | 01.10.1977 | 196 | 89 | 353 | 330 |
| 9 | Ryan Millar | 22.01.1978 | 204 | 98 | 354 | 326 |
| 10 | Riley Salmon | 02.07.1976 | 197 | 89 | 345 | 331 |
| 11 | Brook Billings | 30.04.1980 | 196 | 95 | 351 | 331 |
| 12 | Thomas Hoff | 09.06.1973 | 198 | 94 | 353 | 333 |
| 13 | Clayton Stanley | 20.01.1978 | 205 | 104 | 357 | 332 |
| 15 | Gabriel Gardner | 18.03.1976 | 209 | 103 | 353 | 335 |
| 17 | James Polster | 08.02.1979 | 198 | 100 | 352 | 333 |
| 18 | Adam Naeve | 09.02.1978 | 211 | 98 | 353 | 338 |

== Venezuela ==
- Head Coach: Miguel Cambero

| # | Name | Date of Birth | Height | Weight | Spike | Block |
|---|---|---|---|---|---|---|
| 4 | Gustavo Valderrama | 31.07.1977 | 192 | 80 | 323 | 323 |
| 5 | Rodman Valera | 20.04.1982 | 188 | 82 | 337 | 332 |
| 6 | Carlos Luna | 25.01.1981 | 194 | 85 | 339 | 331 |
| 7 | Luis Díaz | 20.08.1983 | 204 | 92 | 349 | 342 |
| 8 | Andrés Manzanillo | 01.08.1977 | 197 | 80 | 334 | 334 |
| 10 | Ronald Méndez | 26.10.1982 | 203 | 84 | 357 | 352 |
| 11 | Ernardo Gómez (c) | 30.07.1982 | 195 | 85 | 355 | 350 |
| 12 | Carlos Tejeda | 28.07.1980 | 198 | 90 | 340 | 315 |
| 13 | Iván Márquez | 04.10.1981 | 205 | 85 | 339 | 333 |
| 14 | Thomas Ereu | 25.10.1979 | 193 | 85 | 338 | 330 |
| 17 | Juan Carlos Blanco | 27.07.1981 | 195 | 83 | 341 | 336 |
| 18 | Fredy Cedeño | 10.09.1981 | 202 | 90 | 353 | 348 |
