= Sérgio Santos (volleyball) =

Brazilian volleyball player

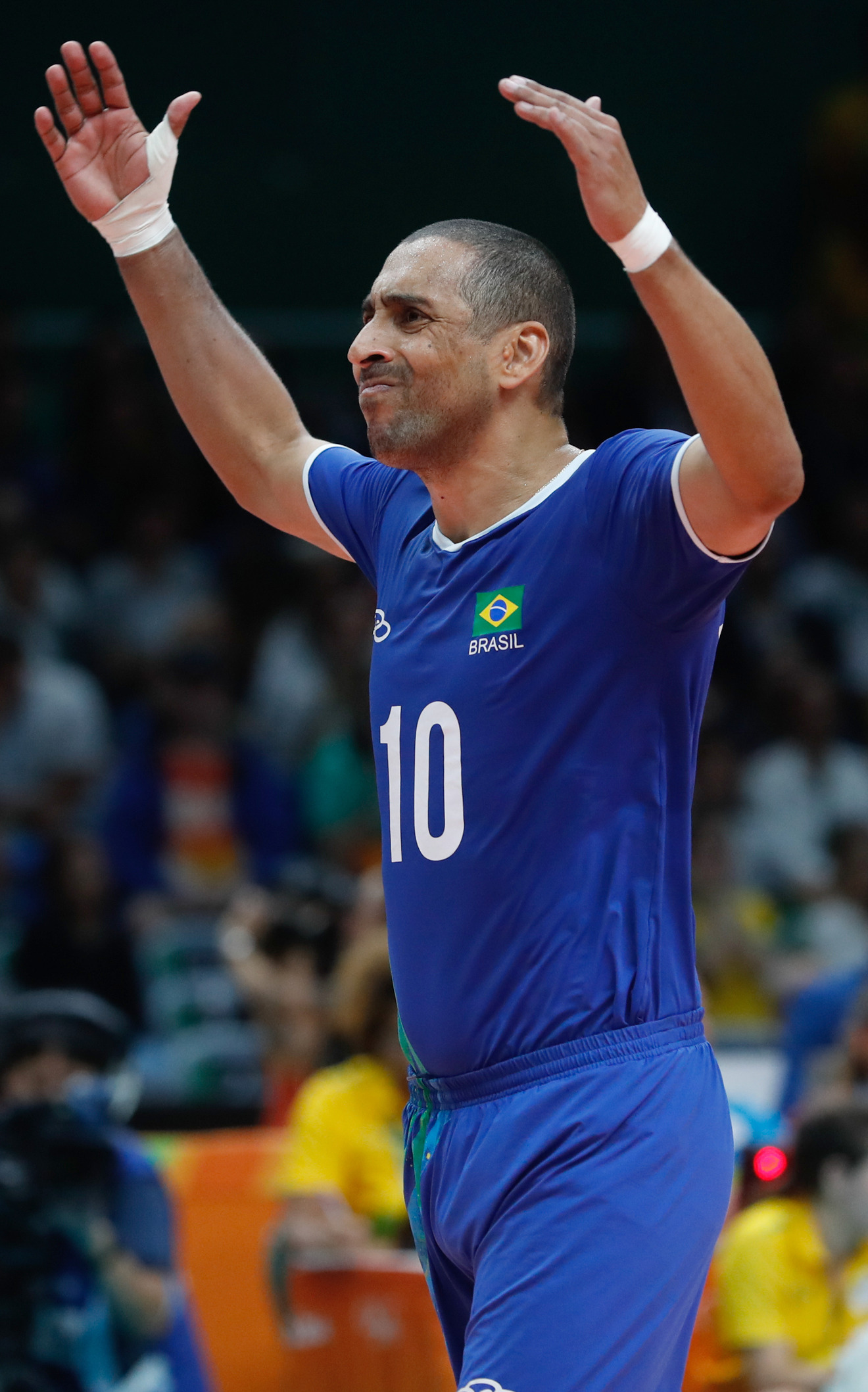
- Serginho at the 2016 Olympics

Personal information
- Full name: Sérgio Dutra dos Santos
- Nickname: Serginho
- Born: 15 October 1975 (age 51); Diamante do Norte, Brazil
- Height: 1.84 m (6 ft 0 in)
- Weight: 78 kg (172 lb)
- Spike: 325 cm (128 in)
- Block: 310 cm (120 in)

Volleyball information
- Position: Libero
- Current club: retired
- Number: 10

Career
Years	Teams
1992–1997	SE Palmeiras
1997–1999	CRET São Caetano
1999–2000	EC União Suzano
2000–2004	EC Banespa
2004–2008	Copra Berni Piacenza
2008–2010	BVC São Bernardo
2010–2017	SESI São Paulo
2017–2019	Corinthians/Guarulhos
2019–2020	Ribeirão Preto Vôlei

National team
2001–2016	Brazil
Honours
Men's volleyball
Representing Brazil
Event	1st	2nd	3rd
Olympic Games	2	2	0
World Championship	2	0	0
World Grand Champions Cup	2	0	0
World Cup	2	0	1
World League	7	3	0
South American Championship	7	0	0
Pan American Games	1	0	1
America's Cup	1	2	0
Total	24	7	2
Olympic Games
Gold medal – first place	2004 Athens	Team
Gold medal – first place	2016 Rio de Janeiro	Team
Silver medal – second place	2008 Beijing	Team
Silver medal – second place	2012 London	Team
World Championship
Gold medal – first place	2002 Argentina	
Gold medal – first place	2006 Japan	
World Grand Champions Cup
Gold medal – first place	2005 Japan	
Gold medal – first place	2009 Japan	
World League
Gold medal – first place	2001 Katowice	
Gold medal – first place	2003 Madrid	
Gold medal – first place	2004 Rome	
Gold medal – first place	2005 Belgrade	
Gold medal – first place	2006 Moscow	
Gold medal – first place	2007 Katowice	
Gold medal – first place	2009 Belgrade	
Silver medal – second place	2002 Belo Horizonte	
Silver medal – second place	2011 Gdańsk	
Silver medal – second place	2016 Kraków	
World Cup
Gold medal – first place	2003 Japan	
Gold medal – first place	2007 Japan	
Bronze medal – third place	2011 Japan	
Pan American Games
Gold medal – first place	2007 Rio de Janeiro	Team
Bronze medal – third place	2003 Santo Domingo	Team
South American Championship
Gold medal – first place	2001 Colombia	
Gold medal – first place	2003 Brazil	
Gold medal – first place	2005 Brazil	
Gold medal – first place	2007 Chile	
Gold medal – first place	2009 Colombia	
Gold medal – first place	2011 Brazil	
Gold medal – first place	2015 Brazil	
- Last updated: 24 August 2016

Sérgio Dutra dos Santos, known as Serginho or Escadinha (born 15 October 1975) is a Brazilian former volleyball player and four-time Olympian. As a member of the Brazilian national volleyball team, he won gold medals at the 2004 and 2016 Olympics, and silver medals at the 2008 and 2012 Olympics.

Additionally, Serginho is a two-time World Champion (2006, 2010), and a multimedalist of the World League, South American Championship, World Cup, and the Grand Champions Cup. In 2009, he became the first libero to be named Most Valuable Player in the history of the FIVB World League.

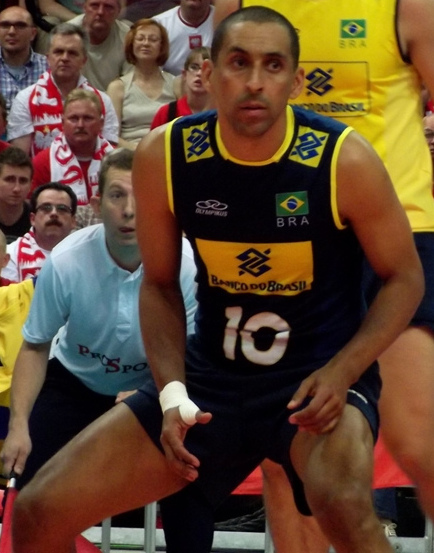
Serginho during match of 2012 FIVB World League.

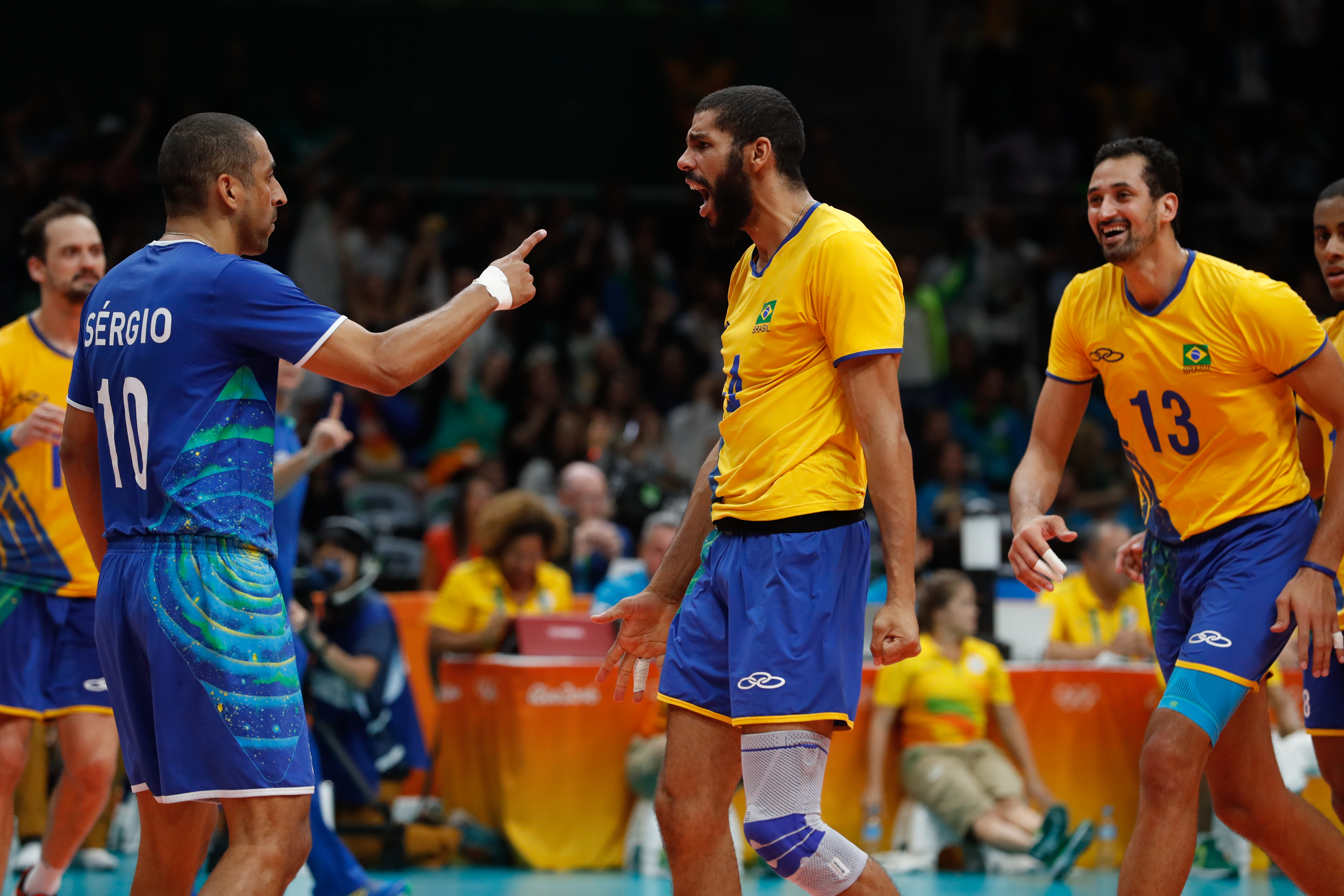
Sérgio Santos with teammates Wallace de Souza, Maurício Souza during match with France at 2016 Olympics in Rio.

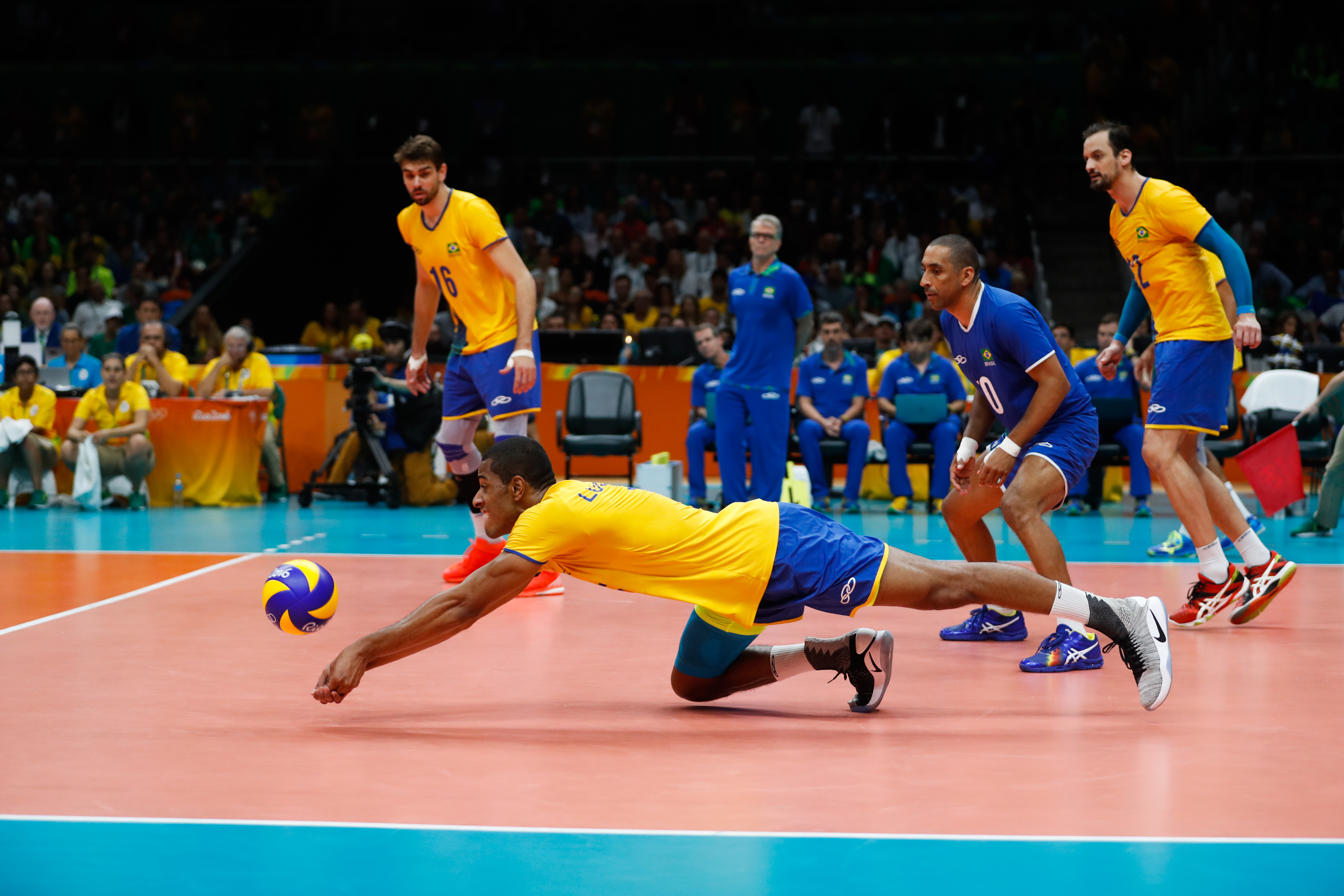
The finale with Italy at 2016 Olympics in Rio.

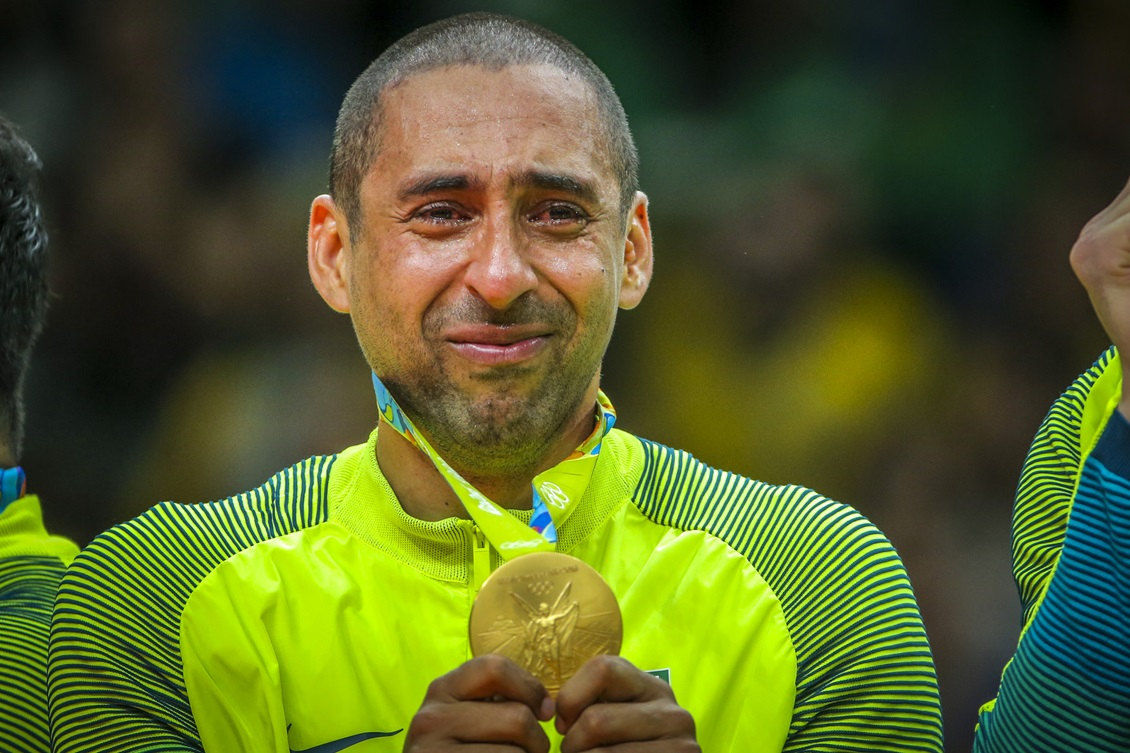
Medal ceremony at 2016 Olympics.

== Career ==
Serginho is widely regarded as one of the best liberos of all time and is unquestionably the best libero of the 2000s, with more awards than any other libero. Known for his outstanding service reception and digging capabilities, teams often attempt to avoid Sergio when serving. Beyond his defensive abilities, he is also capable of running the offense as a 'second setter' if the setter is forced to make the first contact. This is in large part due to Sergio playing the setting position while growing up and subbing in as a setter for his professional club teams over the years.

Serginho is a multimedialist of every volleyball tournament in the 2000s. He is a seven-time South American Champion, and he won with Brazil every South American Championship during his whole career in the national team. In 2002 and 2006, he achieved titles of World Champion. During his career, he achieved seven gold and three silver medals of the FIVB World League. In his achievements are also medals in World Cup, World Grand Champions Cup, and Pan American Games.

In 2004, Serginho became an Olympic Champion for the first time. However, in the next two Olympics, the Brazilian national volleyball team won silver medals only. Serginho semi-retired from the national team after the 2012 Olympics, and returned only for the 2015 World League. After that he declined to compete at the 2016 Rio Olympics, but was persuaded by Bernardinho to return. Bernardinho claimed that, while Serginho no longer had the agility that made him famous, he had experience and maturity to lead the team during a tournament that would certainly be rife with pressure on the Brazilian team, since they were playing on their country and coming from two losses on previous Olympics. Serginho was essential to motivate his team against France. They were losing, and on a break, Serginho told his colleagues that, while they all had at least one more chance at going to the Olympics, he didn't – those would be his last Olympic Games. Eventually, Brazil won the gold medal against Italy, and Serginho was acclaimed by the cheering fans, who called him king. After the match against Italy, Serginho was named the tournament's most valued player. He announced after the Rio finals against Italy he will play professionally for two more years.

== Sporting achievements ==
=== Clubs ===
==== CEV Champions League ====
- 2007/2008 – with Copra Piacenza

==== CEV Top Teams Cup ====
- 2005/2006 – with Copra Piacenza

==== National championships ====
- 1993/1994 Brazilian Championship, with SE Palmeiras
- 1994/1995 Brazilian Championship, with SE Palmeiras
- 2001/2002 Brazilian Championship, with CRET São Caetano
- 2002/2003 Brazilian Championship, with CRET São Caetano
- 2004/2005 Italian Championship, with Copra Piacenza
- 2006/2007 Italian Championship, with Copra Piacenza
- 2007/2008 Italian Championship, with Copra Piacenza
- 2010/2011 Brazilian Championship, with SESI São Paulo
- 2012/2013 Brazilian Championship, with SESI São Paulo
- 2013/2014 Brazilian Championship, with SESI São Paulo
- 2014/2015 Brazilian Championship, with SESI São Paulo

=== National team ===
- 2001 America's Cup
- 2001 FIVB World League
- 2001 South American Championship
- 2002 FIVB World League
- 2002 FIVB World Championship
- 2003 Pan American Games
- 2003 FIVB World League
- 2003 South American Championship
- 2003 FIVB World Cup
- 2004 FIVB World League
- 2004 Olympic Games
- 2005 America's Cup
- 2005 FIVB World League
- 2005 South American Championship
- 2005 FIVB World Grand Champions Cup
- 2006 FIVB World League
- 2006 FIVB World Championship
- 2007 Pan American Games
- 2007 FIVB World League
- 2007 South American Championship
- 2007 FIVB World Cup
- 2008 America's Cup
- 2008 Olympic Games
- 2009 FIVB World League
- 2009 South American Championship
- 2009 FIVB World Grand Champions Cup
- 2010 FIVB World League
- 2010 FIVB World Championship
- 2011 FIVB World League
- 2011 South American Championship
- 2011 FIVB World Cup
- 2012 Olympic Games
- 2015 South American Championship
- 2016 FIVB World League
- 2016 Olympic Games

=== Individual ===
- 2001 Brazilian League – Best Libero
- 2001 America's Cup – Best Digger
- 2002 Brazilian League – Best Libero
- 2002 Brazilian League – Best Digger
- 2002 FIVB World League – Best Digger
- 2003 Brazilian League – Best Libero
- 2003 Brazilian League – Best Receiver
- 2003 Pan American Games – Best Libero
- 2003 FIVB World League – Best Digger
- 2003 FIVB World League – Best Receiver
- 2003 FIVB World Cup – Best Libero
- 2004 Olympic Games – Best Digger
- 2004 Olympic Games – Best Receiver
- 2004 Olympic Games – Best Libero
- 2006 CEV Top Teams Cup – Best Libero
- 2007 Pan American Games – Best Receiver
- 2007 Pan American Games – Best Libero
- 2007 South American Championship – Best Libero
- 2007 FIVB World Cup – Best Libero
- 2008 CEV Champions League – Best Libero
- 2008 America's Cup – Best Receiver
- 2008 America's Cup – Best Libero
- 2009 FIVB World League – Most Valuable Player
- 2009 South American Championship – Best Libero
- 2009 FIVB World Grand Champions Cup – Best Libero
- 2010 Brazilian League – Best Digger
- 2011 Brazilian League – Best Digger
- 2011 South American Club Championship – Best Digger
- 2011 South American Club Championship – Best Libero
- 2011 South American Championship – Best Digger
- 2011 South American Championship – Best Receiver
- 2011 South American Championship – Best Libero
- 2011 South American Championship – Most Valuable Player
- 2011 FIVB World Cup – Best Receiver
- 2011 FIVB Club World Championship – Best Receiver
- 2011 FIVB Club World Championship – Best Libero
- 2015 South American Championship – Most Valuable Player
- 2016 Olympic Games – Best Libero
- 2016 Olympic Games – Most Valuable Player

Awards
Preceded by ?	Best Digger of FIVB World League; 2002; 2003	Succeeded by (Bulgaria) Teodor Salparov
Preceded by (Russia) Pavel Abramov	Best Digger of FIVB World League; 2003	Succeeded by (Brazil) Dante Amaral
Preceded by –	Best Libero of FIVB World Cup; 2003; 2007	Succeeded by (China) Ren Qi
Preceded by (Federal Republic of Yugoslavia) Vasa Mijić	Best Digger; Olympic Games; Athens 2004	Succeeded by (Russia) Aleksey Verbov
Preceded by (Argentina) Pablo Meana	Best Receiver; Olympic Games; Athens 2004	Succeeded by (Poland) Michał Winiarski
Preceded by –	Best Libero; Olympic Games; Athens 2004	Succeeded by (Italy) Mirko Corsano
Preceded by (United States) Lloy Ball	Most Valuable Player of FIVB World League; 2009	Succeeded by (Brazil) Murilo Endres
Preceded by –	Best Receiver of FIVB World Cup; 2011	Succeeded by –
Preceded by (Germany) Markus Steuerwald	Best Libero; Olympic Games; Rio 2016	Succeeded by (France) Jenia Grebennikov
Preceded by (Brazil) Murilo Endres	Most Valuable Player; Olympic Games; Rio 2016	Succeeded by (France) Earvin N'Gapeth
