= 2006 FIVB Volleyball World League =

International sport competition

2006 World League
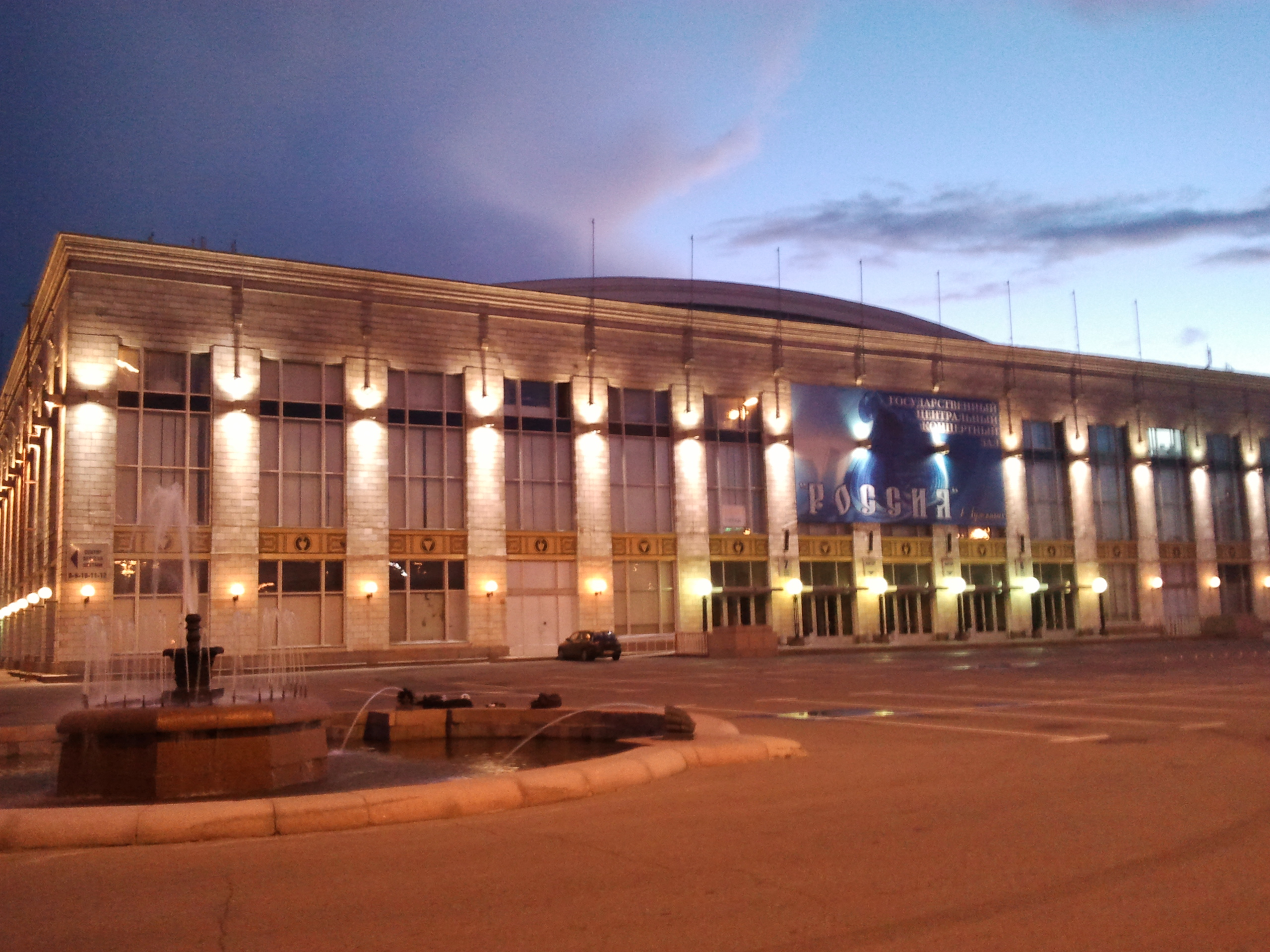
- The final round was held at Luzhniki Palace of Sports in Moscow

Tournament details
- Host country: Russia (Final)
- Dates: 14 July – 27 August
- Teams: 16

Final positions
- Champions: Brazil (6th title)

Tournament awards
- MVP: (Brazil) Gilberto Godoy Filho

The 2006 FIVB Volleyball World League was the 17th edition of the annual men's international volleyball tournament, played by 16 countries from 14 July to 27 August 2006. The Final Round was held in Moscow, Russia.

== Pools composition ==
Pool A	Pool B	Pool C	Pool D
Serbia and Montenegro; United States; Poland; Japan	Brazil; Argentina; Portugal; Finland	Italy; Russia; China; France	Cuba; South Korea; Bulgaria; Egypt

== Intercontinental round ==
- The Final Round hosts Russia, the winners of each pool and a wild card chosen by the FIVB will qualify for the Final Round. If Russia are ranked first in Pool C, the team ranked second of Pool C will qualify for the Final Round.

=== Pool A ===
Pos	Team	Pld	W	L	Pts	SW	SL	SR	SPW	SPL	SPR	Qualification
1	Serbia and Montenegro	12	9	3	21	29	18	1.611	1108	1039	1.066	Final round
2	Poland	12	9	3	21	31	19	1.632	1161	1118	1.038	
3	United States	12	5	7	17	22	23	0.957	1027	985	1.043	
4	Japan	12	1	11	13	11	33	0.333	924	1078	0.857	

Date		Score		Set 1	Set 2	Set 3	Set 4	Set 5	Total	Report
14 Jul	United States	3–1	Poland	25–22	23–25	23–25	23–25		94–97	P2
15 Jul	Japan	3–0	Serbia and Montenegro	25–22	25–22	25–20			75–64	P2
15 Jul	United States	1–3	Poland	24–26	13–25	25–20	22–25		84–96	P2
16 Jul	Japan	1–3	Serbia and Montenegro	28–26	16–25	26–28	22–25		92–104	P2
21 Jul	Serbia and Montenegro	3–1	Poland	25–17	22–25	25–19	32–30		104–91	P2
22 Jul	Japan	0–3	United States	15–25	22–25	17–25			54–75	P2
22 Jul	Serbia and Montenegro	3–2	Poland	25–19	22–25	25–17	16–25	15–11	103–97	P2
23 Jul	Japan	0–3	United States	12–25	21–25	18–25			51–75	P2
29 Jul	Poland	1–3	Serbia and Montenegro	17–25	25–21	24–26	21–25		87–97	P2
29 Jul	United States	3–0	Japan	25–18	25–20	25–18			75–56	P2
30 Jul	Poland	3–1	Serbia and Montenegro	25–23	21–25	25–18	25–19		96–85	P2
30 Jul	United States	3–1	Japan	25–15	21–25	25–17	25–15		96–72	P2
4 Aug	United States	1–3	Serbia and Montenegro	25–13	34–36	22–25	17–25		98–99	P2
5 Aug	Japan	2–3	Poland	19–25	28–30	25–21	25–18	20–22	117–116	P2
5 Aug	United States	3–1	Serbia and Montenegro	27–25	25–22	25–27	25–21		102–95	P2
6 Aug	Japan	0–3	Poland	33–35	21–25	17–25			71–85	P2
12 Aug	Poland	3–2	United States	17–25	21–25	25–19	25–23	17–15	105–107	P2
12 Aug	Serbia and Montenegro	3–0	Japan	26–24	25–17	25–19			76–60	P2
13 Aug	Poland	3–0	United States	25–22	25–19	25–23			75–64	P2
13 Aug	Serbia and Montenegro	3–1	Japan	25–18	25–20	21–25	25–21		96–84	P2
18 Aug	Serbia and Montenegro	3–2	United States	21–25	24–26	25–16	25–16	15–13	110–96	P2
19 Aug	Poland	3–1	Japan	24–26	25–23	25–23	25–13		99–85	P2
19 Aug	Serbia and Montenegro	3–0	United States	25–23	25–15	25–23			75–61	P2
20 Aug	Poland	3–2	Japan	22–25	25–18	25–19	23–25	22–20	117–107	P2

=== Pool B ===
Pos	Team	Pld	W	L	Pts	SW	SL	SR	SPW	SPL	SPR	Qualification
1	Brazil	12	12	0	24	36	6	6.000	1047	865	1.210	Final round
2	Argentina	12	7	5	19	22	21	1.048	979	1010	0.969	
3	Finland	12	4	8	16	19	26	0.731	1007	1040	0.968	
4	Portugal	12	1	11	13	11	35	0.314	994	1112	0.894	

Date		Score		Set 1	Set 2	Set 3	Set 4	Set 5	Total	Report
14 Jul	Finland	3–0	Portugal	25–21	29–27	25–19			79–67	P2
15 Jul	Argentina	0–3	Brazil	20–25	23–25	22–25			65–75	P2
15 Jul	Finland	3–0	Portugal	26–24	25–20	25–22			76–66	P2
16 Jul	Argentina	0–3	Brazil	17–25	17–25	20–25			54–75	P2
22 Jul	Brazil	3–1	Argentina	25–15	24–26	25–22	25–23		99–86	P2
22 Jul	Portugal	3–2	Finland	25–23	18–25	16–25	25–22	15–13	99–108	P2
23 Jul	Brazil	3–0	Argentina	25–15	25–17	25–21			75–53	P2
23 Jul	Portugal	2–3	Finland	25–15	22–25	25–20	27–29	10–15	109–104	P2
28 Jul	Finland	0–3	Argentina	22–25	18–25	22–25			62–75	P2
29 Jul	Portugal	0–3	Brazil	23–25	20–25	15–25			58–75	P2
29 Jul	Finland	0–3	Argentina	23–25	20–25	23–25			66–75	P2
30 Jul	Portugal	0–3	Brazil	20–25	16–25	22–25			58–75	P2
4 Aug	Finland	0–3	Brazil	17–25	22–25	21–25			60–75	P2
5 Aug	Portugal	2–3	Argentina	22–25	20–25	27–25	25–16	12–15	106–106	P2
5 Aug	Finland	1–3	Brazil	17–25	25–27	25–22	17–25		84–99	P2
6 Aug	Portugal	2–3	Argentina	25–23	29–27	25–27	19–25	19–21	117–123	P2
12 Aug	Brazil	3–1	Finland	22–25	25–19	25–19	25–20		97–83	P2
12 Aug	Argentina	3–0	Portugal	25–22	25–18	30–28			80–68	P2
13 Aug	Brazil	3–1	Finland	25–23	25–21	23–25	25–23		98–92	P2
13 Aug	Argentina	3–0	Portugal	25–22	32–30	25–22			82–74	P2
19 Aug	Brazil	3–1	Portugal	22–25	25–20	25–21	25–18		97–84	P2
19 Aug	Argentina	3–2	Finland	22–25	36–34	25–18	27–29	15–12	125–118	P2
20 Aug	Brazil	3–1	Portugal	25–17	32–34	25–20	25–17		107–88	P2
20 Aug	Argentina	0–3	Finland	19–25	19–25	17–25			55–75	P2

=== Pool C ===
Pos	Team	Pld	W	L	Pts	SW	SL	SR	SPW	SPL	SPR	Qualification
1	France	12	9	3	21	29	19	1.526	1110	1065	1.042	Final round
2	Russia (Note: Qualified as hosts) (H)	12	8	4	20	30	16	1.875	1060	977	1.085	Final round
3	Italy (Note: Qualified as wild card)	12	7	5	19	27	19	1.421	1057	1002	1.055	Final round
4	China	12	0	12	12	4	36	0.111	808	991	0.815	

(H) Host
Notes:

Date		Score		Set 1	Set 2	Set 3	Set 4	Set 5	Total	Report
15 Jul	Russia	2–3	France	22–25	23–25	25–19	25–20	13–15	108–104	P2
15 Jul	China	0–3	Italy	14–25	14–25	25–27			53–77	P2
16 Jul	China	0–3	Italy	17–25	24–26	18–25			59–76	P2
16 Jul	Russia	3–0	France	25–20	32–30	25–20			82–70	P2
21 Jul	Italy	1–3	France	20–25	25–19	20–25	23–25		88–94	P2
22 Jul	China	1–3	Russia	22–25	30–28	19–25	29–31		100–109	P2
23 Jul	China	0–3	Russia	23–25	23–25	18–25			64–75	P2
23 Jul	Italy	2–3	France	29–27	25–23	20–25	21–25	14–16	109–116	P2
28 Jul	Italy	0–3	Russia	21–25	21–25	18–25			60–75	P2
29 Jul	China	0–3	France	26–28	22–25	23–25			71–78	P2
30 Jul	China	0–3	France	21–25	20–25	22–25			63–75	P2
30 Jul	Italy	1–3	Russia	16–25	19–25	25–23	23–25		83–98	P2
5 Aug	Russia	3–0	China	25–12	25–17	25–22			75–51	P2
5 Aug	France	2–3	Italy	27–29	27–25	25–21	24–26	17–19	120–120	P2
6 Aug	Russia	3–2	China	25–13	21–25	25–17	16–25	15–12	102–92	P2
6 Aug	France	3–2	Italy	23–25	25–18	26–28	25–20	16–14	115–105	P2
11 Aug	Italy	3–0	China	25–18	25–21	25–20			75–59	P2
12 Aug	France	0–3	Russia	23–25	24–26	18–25			65–76	P2
12 Aug	Italy	3–0	China	25–14	25–22	25–13			75–49	P2
13 Aug	France	3–2	Russia	25–17	18–25	25–20	16–25	15–9	99–96	P2
19 Aug	France	3–1	China	25–18	25–17	22–25	27–25		99–85	P2
19 Aug	Russia	0–3	Italy	22–25	27–29	24–26			73–80	P2
20 Aug	France	3–0	China	25–22	25–22	25–18			75–62	P2
20 Aug	Russia	2–3	Italy	18–25	25–22	17–25	25–22	6–15	91–109	P2

=== Pool D ===
Pos	Team	Pld	W	L	Pts	SW	SL	SR	SPW	SPL	SPR	Qualification
1	Bulgaria	12	10	2	22	33	8	4.125	990	838	1.181	Final round
2	Cuba	12	10	2	22	30	11	2.727	971	832	1.167	
3	South Korea	12	4	8	16	15	28	0.536	925	994	0.931	
4	Egypt	12	0	12	12	5	36	0.139	779	1001	0.778	

Date		Score		Set 1	Set 2	Set 3	Set 4	Set 5	Total	Report
15 Jul	South Korea	1–3	Cuba	23–25	16–25	25–21	21–25		85–96	P2
15 Jul	Bulgaria	3–0	Egypt	26–24	25–21	25–16			76–61	P2
16 Jul	South Korea	0–3	Cuba	20–25	24–26	21–25			65–76	P2
16 Jul	Bulgaria	3–0	Egypt	25–16	25–19	25–19			75–54	P2
21 Jul	Cuba	3–0	Egypt	25–18	25–18	25–12			75–48	P2
22 Jul	South Korea	1–3	Bulgaria	21–25	25–27	25–22	21–25		92–99	P2
22 Jul	Cuba	3–0	Egypt	25–17	25–19	25–19			75–55	P2
23 Jul	South Korea	0–3	Bulgaria	20–25	22–25	21–25			63–75	P2
28 Jul	Egypt	1–3	South Korea	25–21	15–25	19–25	16–25		75–96	P2
30 Jul	Egypt	0–3	South Korea	23–25	22–25	18–25			63–75	P2
31 Jul	Cuba	3–1	Bulgaria	25–19	25–21	22–25	25–16		97–81	P2
1 Aug	Cuba	0–3	Bulgaria	20–25	22–25	21–25			63–75	P2
4 Aug	Egypt	1–3	Cuba	14–25	21–25	25–23	11–25		71–98	P2
5 Aug	Bulgaria	3–1	South Korea	25–21	16–25	25–16	25–19		91–81	P2
6 Aug	Bulgaria	3–0	South Korea	25–19	25–19	25–18			75–56	P2
6 Aug	Egypt	0–3	Cuba	13–25	17–25	23–25			53–75	P2
12 Aug	South Korea	3–2	Egypt	25–19	21–25	25–20	21–25	15–13	107–102	P2
12 Aug	Bulgaria	2–3	Cuba	22–25	27–29	25–13	25–15	14–16	113–98	P2
13 Aug	South Korea	3–1	Egypt	21–25	25–22	28–26	25–19		99–92	P2
13 Aug	Bulgaria	3–0	Cuba	30–28	25–19	25–21			80–68	P2
18 Aug	Egypt	0–3	Bulgaria	20–25	19–25	11–25			50–75	P2
18 Aug	Cuba	3–0	South Korea	25–17	25–19	25–13			75–49	P2
19 Aug	Cuba	3–0	South Korea	25–18	25–18	25–21			75–57	P2
20 Aug	Egypt	0–3	Bulgaria	20–25	19–25	16–25			55–75	P2

== Final round ==
- Venue: Luzhniki Small Sports Arena, Moscow, Russia
- All times are Moscow Summer Time (UTC+04:00).

=== Pool play ===
==== Pool E ====
Pos	Team	Pld	W	L	Pts	SW	SL	SR	SPW	SPL	SPR	Qualification
1	Russia	3	2	1	5	8	5	1.600	287	261	1.100	Semifinals
2	France	3	1	2	4	7	8	0.875	325	317	1.025	Semifinals
3	Serbia and Montenegro	3	1	2	4	3	8	0.375	241	262	0.920	

Date	Time		Score		Set 1	Set 2	Set 3	Set 4	Set 5	Total	Report
23 Aug	20:07	Russia	3–0	Serbia and Montenegro	25–20	26–24	25–18			76–62	P2
24 Aug	20:07	France	2–3	Russia	23–25	25–21	22–25	25–21	10–15	105–107	P2
25 Aug	17:07	Serbia and Montenegro	3–2	France	26–24	22–25	25–19	20–25	18–16	111–109	P2

==== Pool F ====
Pos	Team	Pld	W	L	Pts	SW	SL	SR	SPW	SPL	SPR	Qualification
1	Bulgaria	3	3	0	6	9	0	MAX	231	194	1.191	Semifinals
2	Brazil	3	2	1	5	6	6	1.000	246	258	0.953	Semifinals
3	Italy	3	0	3	3	3	9	0.333	244	282	0.865	

Date	Time		Score		Set 1	Set 2	Set 3	Set 4	Set 5	Total	Report
23 Aug	14:07	Brazil	0–3	Bulgaria	17–25	23–25	20–25			60–75	P2
24 Aug	14:07	Italy	1–3	Brazil	14–25	25–17	19–25	21–25		79–92	P2
25 Aug	14:07	Bulgaria	3–0	Italy	25–20	29–27	25–19			79–66	P2

==== Playoff ====
- The results were included in the standings of the Pool E and F.

Date	Time		Score		Set 1	Set 2	Set 3	Set 4	Set 5	Total	Report
23 Aug	17:07	France	3–2	Italy	25–18	23–25	23–25	25–20	15–11	111–99	P2
24 Aug	17:07	Serbia and Montenegro	0–3	Bulgaria	24–26	20–25	24–26			68–77	P2
25 Aug	20:07	Russia	2–3	Brazil	25–15	18–25	25–13	24–26	12–15	104–94	P2

=== Final four ===
Semifinals
26 August
Bulgaria	0
France	3
26 August
Russia	1
Brazil	3

Final
27 August
France	2
Brazil	3
3rd place match
27 August
Bulgaria	0
Russia	3

==== Semifinals ====
Date	Time		Score		Set 1	Set 2	Set 3	Set 4	Set 5	Total	Report
26 Aug	16:07	Bulgaria	0–3	France	21–25	20–25	20–25			61–75	P2
26 Aug	19:07	Russia	1–3	Brazil	19–25	19–25	29–27	27–29		94–106	P2

==== 3rd place match ====
Date	Time		Score		Set 1	Set 2	Set 3	Set 4	Set 5	Total	Report
27 Aug	16:07	Bulgaria	0–3	Russia	20–25	19–25	19–25			58–75	P2

==== Final ====
Date	Time		Score		Set 1	Set 2	Set 3	Set 4	Set 5	Total	Report
27 Aug	19:07	France	2–3	Brazil	25–22	25–23	22–25	23–25	13–15	108–110	P2

== Final standing ==
Rank	Team
1st place, gold medalist(s)	Brazil
2nd place, silver medalist(s)	France
3rd place, bronze medalist(s)	Russia
4	Bulgaria
5	Serbia and Montenegro
6	Italy
7	Argentina
7	Cuba
7	Poland
10	Finland
10	South Korea
10	United States
13	China
13	Egypt
13	Japan
13	Portugal

2006 World League champions

Brazil
6th title

12-man Roster for Final Round
Marcelinho, André Heller, Giba, Murilo, André, Sérgio, Anderson, Samuel, Gustavo, Rodrigão, Ricardo, Dante
Head coach
Bernardinho

== Awards ==
- Most valuable player
  (Brazil) Gilberto Godoy Filho
- Best scorer
  (France) Sébastien Ruette
- Best spiker
  (Bulgaria) Matey Kaziyski
- Best blocker
  (France) Vincent Montméat
- Best server
  (Brazil) André Nascimento
- Best setter
  (Bulgaria) Andrey Zhekov
- Best libero
  (Russia) Aleksey Verbov
