= Rodrigão =

Brazilian volleyball player

Rodrigo Santana
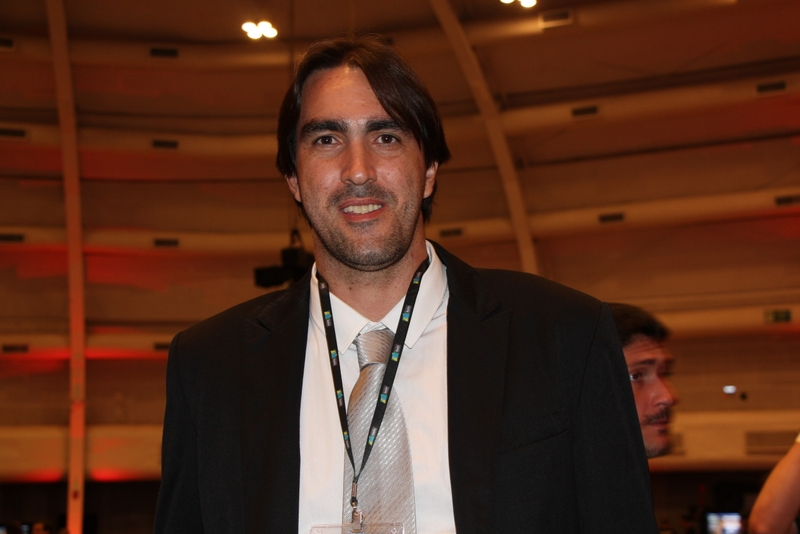

Personal information
- Nickname: Rodrigão
- Born: 17 April 1979 (age 47); São Paulo, Brazil
- Height: 2.05 m (6 ft 9 in)
- Weight: 85 kg (187 lb)
- Spike: 350 cm (138 in)
- Block: 328 cm (129 in)

Volleyball information
- Position: Middle blocker
- Current club: Retired

Career
Years	Teams
1996–2000	ECUS/Suzano
2000–2003	EC Banespa
2003–2004	4Torri Ferrara Volley
2004–2005	ECUS/Suzano
2005–2009	Lube Volley
2009–2011	EC Pinheiros
2011–2012	SESI São Paulo
2013–2014	RJX
2014–2015	Barij Essence Kashan VC
2014–2015	Palembang Bank Sumsel Babel

National team
2000–2012	Brazil
Honours
Men's volleyball
Representing Brazil
Event	1st	2nd	3rd
Olympic Games	1	2	0
World Championship	3	0	0
World Cup	2	0	1
World Grand Champions Cup	2	1	0
World League	8	2	1
Pan American Games	1	0	1
Total	17	5	3
Olympic Games
Gold medal – first place	2004 Athens	Team
Silver medal – second place	2008 Beijing	Team
Silver medal – second place	2012 London	Team
World Championship
Gold medal – first place	2002 Argentina	Team
Gold medal – first place	2006 Japan	Team
Gold medal – first place	2010 Italy	Team
World Cup
Gold medal – first place	2003 Japan	Team
Gold medal – first place	2007 Japan	Team
Bronze medal – third place	2011 Japan	Team
World Grand Champions Cup
Gold medal – first place	2005 Japan	Team
Gold medal – first place	2009 Japan	Team
Silver medal – second place	2001 Japan	Team
World League
Gold medal – first place	2001 Katowice	Team
Gold medal – first place	2003 Madrid	Team
Gold medal – first place	2004 Rome	Team
Gold medal – first place	2005 Belgrade	Team
Gold medal – first place	2006 Moscow	Team
Gold medal – first place	2007 Katowice	Team
Gold medal – first place	2009 Belgrade	Team
Gold medal – first place	2010 Córdoba	Team
Silver medal – second place	2002 Belo Horizonte	Team
Silver medal – second place	2011 Gdańsk	Team
Bronze medal – third place	2000 Rotterdam	Team
Pan American Games
Gold medal – first place	2007 Rio de Janeiro	Team
Bronze medal – third place	2003 Santo Domingo	Team
South American Championship
Gold medal – first place	2011 Cuiabá	Team

Rodrigo Santana (born 17 April 1979), commonly known as Rodrigão, is a Brazilian former volleyball player who won a gold medal at the 2004 Summer Olympics and a silver medal at the 2008 Summer Olympics and 2012 Summer Olympics. Santana with brazil team won the World Championship in 2002 Argentina, 2006 Japan and 2010 Italy. He also won the World Cup, the Pan-American Games, and the South American Championship, in Chile, where he was elected as the Best attacker.

He was born in São Paulo.

== Sporting achievements ==
=== Clubs ===
- 1996/1997 Brazilian Superliga, with Minas Tênis Clube
- 2005/2006 Italian League, with Lube Volley

==== CEV Challenge Cup ====
- 2005/2006 – with Lube Volley

=== National team ===
- 2000 FIVB World League
- 2001 FIVB World League
- 2001 South American Championship
- 2001 FIVB World Grand Champions Cup
- 2002 FIVB World League
- 2002 FIVB World Championship
- 2003 FIVB World League
- 2003 Pan American Games
- 2003 South American Championship
- 2003 FIVB World Cup
- 2004 FIVB World League
- 2004 Olympic Games
- 2005 FIVB World League
- 2005 South American Championship
- 2005 FIVB World Grand Champions Cup
- 2006 FIVB World League
- 2006 FIVB World Championship
- 2007 FIVB World League
- 2007 Pan American Games
- 2007 South American Championship
- 2007 FIVB World Cup
- 2008 Olympic Games
- 2009 FIVB World League
- 2009 South American Championship
- 2009 FIVB World Grand Champions Cup
- 2010 FIVB World League
- 2010 FIVB World Championship
- 2011 FIVB World League
- 2011 South American Championship
- 2011 FIVB World Cup
- 2012 Olympic Games

=== Individual ===
- 2007 South American Championship – Best Spiker
- 2011 South American Club Championship – Best Blocker
