= 2005 FIVB Volleyball Men's World Grand Champions Cup =

2005 Men's World Grand Champions Cup

Tournament details
- Host country: Japan
- Dates: 22–27 November
- Teams: 6
- Venues: 2 (in 2 host cities)

Final positions
- Champions: Brazil (2nd title)

Tournament awards
- MVP: (Brazil) André Nascimento

The 2005 FIVB Volleyball Men's World Grand Champions Cup was held in Nagano and Tokyo, Japan from 22 to 27 November 2005.

== Qualification ==
Team	Qualified as
Japan	Hosts
Egypt	2005 African Champions
Italy	2005 European Champions
United States	2005 NORCECA Champions
Brazil	2005 South American Champions
China	Wild Card

== Competition formula ==
The competition formula of the 2005 Men's World Grand Champions Cup was the single Round-Robin system. Each team plays once against each of the 5 remaining teams. Points were accumulated during the whole tournament, and the final standing was determined by the total points gained.

== Venues ==
- Nagano White Ring, Nagano, Japan
- Tokyo Metropolitan Gymnasium, Tokyo, Japan

== Results ==
- All times are Japan Standard Time (UTC+09:00).

Pos	Team	Pld	W	L	Pts	SW	SL	SR	SPW	SPL	SPR
1	Brazil	5	5	0	10	15	6	2.500	505	443	1.140
2	United States	5	4	1	9	13	4	3.250	414	356	1.163
3	Italy	5	3	2	8	11	6	1.833	399	358	1.115
4	Japan	5	2	3	7	8	13	0.615	463	469	0.987
5	Egypt	5	1	4	6	5	14	0.357	368	433	0.850
6	China	5	0	5	5	6	15	0.400	405	495	0.818

=== Nagano round ===
Date	Time		Score		Set 1	Set 2	Set 3	Set 4	Set 5	Total	Report
22 Nov	12:00	United States	1–3	Brazil	27–25	22–25	19–25	24–26		92–101	P2
22 Nov	15:00	Italy	3–0	China	25–15	25–15	25–17			75–47	P2
22 Nov	18:00	Egypt	2–3	Japan	16–25	25–23	25–14	23–25	5–15	94–102	P2
23 Nov	12:00	China	2–3	Brazil	25–23	28–26	11–25	18–25	10–15	92–114	P2
23 Nov	15:00	Italy	3–0	Egypt	25–20	25–18	25–19			75–57	P2
23 Nov	18:00	Japan	1–3	United States	22–25	25–22	21–25	23–25		91–97	P2

=== Tokyo round ===
Date	Time		Score		Set 1	Set 2	Set 3	Set 4	Set 5	Total	Report
25 Nov	12:00	Egypt	3–2	China	25–23	21–25	21–25	25–21	15–12	107–106	P2
25 Nov	15:00	United States	3–0	Italy	25–23	25–20	25–18			75–61	P2
25 Nov	18:00	Brazil	3–1	Japan	25–21	25–20	23–25	25–18		98–84	P2
26 Nov	12:00	Egypt	0–3	United States	12–25	21–25	15–25			48–75	P2
26 Nov	15:00	Italy	2–3	Brazil	30–32	20–25	25–23	25–22	13–15	113–117	P2
26 Nov	18:00	China	2–3	Japan	14–25	26–24	20–25	37–35	8–15	105–124	P2
27 Nov	12:00	United States	3–0	China	25–16	25–21	25–18			75–55	P2
27 Nov	15:00	Brazil	3–0	Egypt	25–21	25–20	25–21			75–62	P2
27 Nov	18:00	Japan	0–3	Italy	20–25	22–25	20–25			62–75	P2

== Final standing ==
Rank	Team
1st place, gold medalist(s)	Brazil
2nd place, silver medalist(s)	United States
3rd place, bronze medalist(s)	Italy
4	Japan
5	Egypt
6	China

2005 Men's World Grand Champions Cup champions

Brazil
Second title

Team Roster

Marcelinho, André Heller, Giba, Murilo, André, Sérgio, Anderson, Samuel, Gustavo, Rodrigão, Ezinho, Ricardo

Head Coach: Bernardinho

== Awards ==
- MVP: (Brazil) André Nascimento
- Best scorer: (Brazil) André Nascimento
- Best spiker: (Italy) Alessandro Fei
- Best blocker: (United States) Ryan Millar
- Best server: (Egypt) Abdalsalam Abdallah
- Best setter: (Brazil) Ricardo Garcia
- Best libero: (Italy) Mirko Corsano
