= Murilo Endres =

Brazilian volleyball player (born 1981)

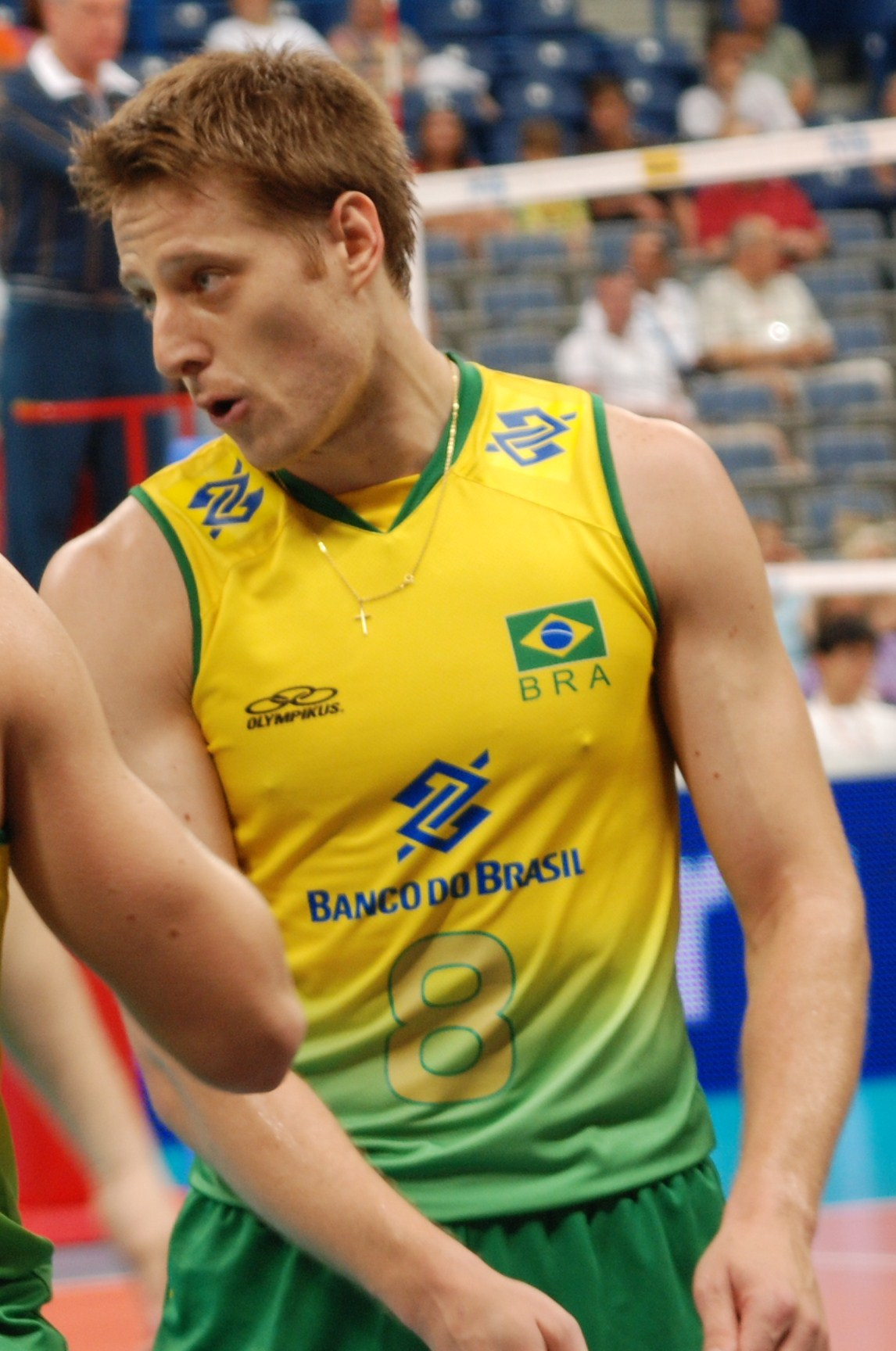

Personal information
- Full name: Murilo Endres
- Nickname: Murilo
- Born: 3 May 1981 (age 45) Passo Fundo, Brazil
- Height: 1.90 m (6 ft 3 in)
- Weight: 76 kg (168 lb)
- Spike: 343 cm (135 in)
- Block: 319 cm (126 in)

Volleyball information
- Position: Outside spiker / libero
- Current club: SESI São Paulo
- Number: 8

Career
- Years: Team
- 1998–2003: EC Banespa
- 2003–2005: EC União Suzano
- 2005–2006: Callipo Vibo Valentia
- 2006–2009: Trenkwalder Modena
- 2009–: SESI São Paulo

National team
- Years: Team
- 2004–2016: Brazil
Honours
Men's volleyball
Representing Brazil
Event	1st	2nd	3rd
Olympic Games	0	2	0
World Championship	2	1	0
World Grand Champions Cup	2	0	0
World Cup	1	0	1
World League	6	2	0
South American Championship	4	0	0
Pan American Games	1	0	0
Total	16	5	1
Olympic Games
Silver medal – second place	2008 Beijing	
Silver medal – second place	2012 London	
World Championship
Gold medal – first place	2006 Japan	
Gold medal – first place	2010 Italy	
Silver medal – second place	2014 Poland	
World Cup
Gold medal – first place	2007 Japan	
Bronze medal – third place	2011 Japan	
World Grand Champions Cup
Gold medal – first place	2005 Japan	
Gold medal – first place	2009 Japan	
World League
Gold medal – first place	2004 Rome	
Gold medal – first place	2005 Belgrade	
Gold medal – first place	2006 Moscow	
Gold medal – first place	2007 Katowice	
Gold medal – first place	2009 Belgrade	
Gold medal – first place	2010 Cordoba	
Silver medal – second place	2011 Gdańsk	
Silver medal – second place	2014 Florence	
Pan American Games
Gold medal – first place	2007 Rio de Janeiro	
South American Championship
Gold medal – first place	2005 Lages	
Gold medal – first place	2007 Santiago	
Gold medal – first place	2009 Bogotá	
Gold medal – first place	2011 Cuiabá	
- Updated on 7 January 2018

Murilo Endres (born 3 May 1981) is a Brazilian volleyball player, member of Brazil men's national volleyball team and Brazilian club SESI São Paulo. He is a double silver medalist of the Olympic Games from Beijing 2008 and London 2012, World Champion (2006, 2010), silver medalist of the World Championship 2014, multimedalist of the World League, South American Championship, World Cup and the Grand Champions Cup.

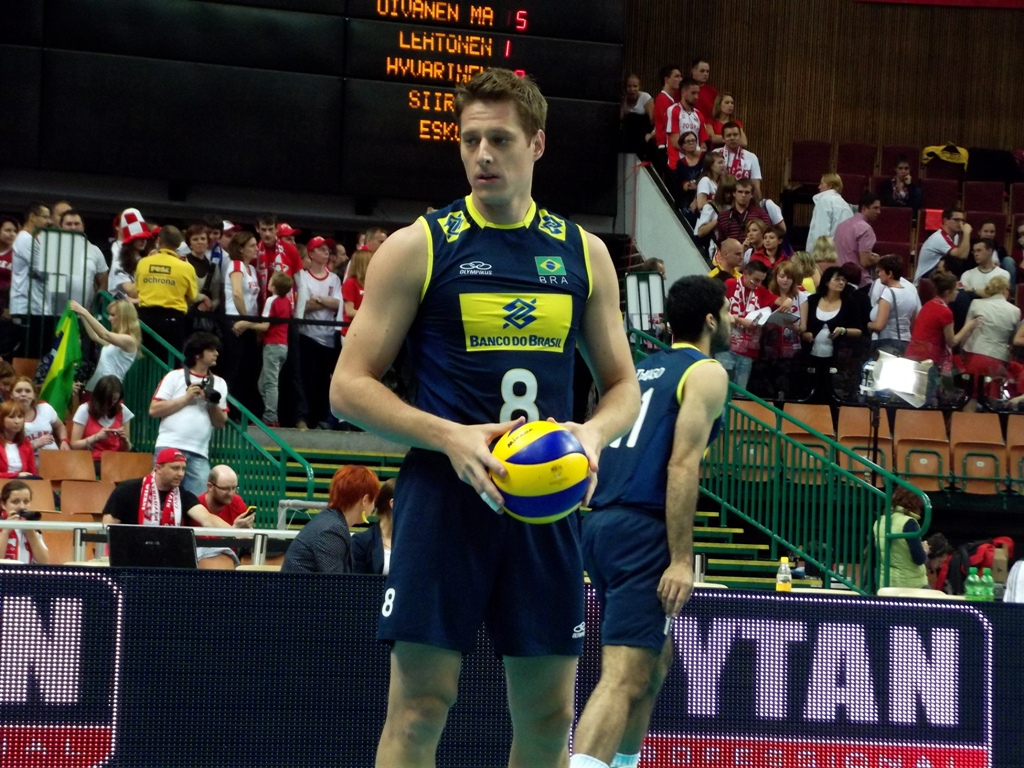
On June 1, 2012 before the match of intercontinental round at Spodek, Katowice (World League 2012).

== Career ==
=== Club ===
From 2006 up to the 2009 season Endres played in Italian League at the club Modena. He played as wing spiker for Sesi São Paulo for the 2010/2011 season, in Brazil.

=== National team ===
With the Brazil national team he won seven World Leagues (2003, 2004, 2005, 2006, 2007, 2009, 2010), one World Cup (2007) and two World Championships (2006, 2010). He was named the MVP of 2010 World Championship and 2010 World League. He competed at the 2008 Summer Olympics and at the 2012 Summer Olympics, winning the silver medal both times. Murilo won the silver medal and the "Best receiver" award at the 2011 FIVB World League. Murilo Endres star player national team in season 2012. He was also named the MVP of the 2012 Summer Olympics tournament. Murilo went through a shoulder surgery in 2013 and was out of the national team for the whole season. In 2014, the wing spiker got back to the national team and helped the team to achieve the silver medal in the FIVB World League. Murilo Endres in 2010 year he was given Prêmio Brasil Olímpico as the best Brazilian athlete of the year. Murilo went through a shoulder surgery in 2013 and was out of the national team for the whole season. In 2014, the wing spiker got back to the national team and helped the team to achieve the silver medal in the FIVB World League and in the FIVB World Championship. After recovery from surgery, Murilo was part of the team that played the World League in 2015.

Endres served an eight-month competition ban during 2017 for an anti-doping rule violation for unintentional use of furosemide that he had ingested from a contaminated product.

== Personal life ==
He was born in Passo Fundo, Rio Grande do Sul, Brazil. He has an older brother Gustavo, who is also volleyball player.

On October 22, 2009 he married Jaqueline Carvalho, who is also a Brazilian volleyball player with whom he has a son.

== Sporting achievements ==
=== Clubs ===
==== Challenge Cup ====
- 2007/2008 - with Trenkwalder Modena

==== National championships ====
- 2010/2011 Brazilian Championship, with SESI São Paulo

=== National team ===
- 2001 FIVB U21 World Championship
- 2004 FIVB World League
- 2005 FIVB World League
- 2005 South American Championship
- 2005 FIVB World Grand Champions Cup
- 2006 FIVB World League
- 2006 FIVB World Championship
- 2007 FIVB World League
- 2007 South American Championship
- 2007 FIVB World Cup
- 2008 Olympic Games
- 2009 FIVB World League
- 2009 South American Championship
- 2009 FIVB World Grand Champions Cup
- 2010 FIVB World League
- 2010 FIVB World Championship
- 2011 FIVB World League
- 2011 South American Championship
- 2011 FIVB World Cup
- 2012 Olympic Games
- 2014 FIVB World League
- 2014 FIVB World Championship

=== Individually ===
- 2009 South American Championship - Most Valuable Player
- 2010 FIVB World League - Most Valuable Player
- 2010 FIVB World Championship - Most Valuable Player
- 2010 Prêmio Brasil Olímpico – Best athlete of the Year
- 2011 Brazilian Championship - Best Receiver
- 2011 Brazilian Championship - Most Valuable Player
- 2011 FIVB World League - Best Receiver
- 2012 Olympic Games London - Most Valuable Player
- 2013 Brazilian Championship - Best Receiver
- 2014 FIVB World Championship - Best Outside Spiker

Awards
Preceded by (Brazil) Gilberto de Godoy	Most Valuable Player of South American Championship; 2009	Succeeded by (Brazil) Sérgio Santos
Preceded by (Brazil) Sérgio Santos	Most Valuable Player of FIVB World League; 2010	Succeeded by (Russia) Maxim Mikhaylov
Preceded by (Brazil) Gilberto de Godoy	Most Valuable Player of FIVB World Championship; 2010	Succeeded by (Poland) Mariusz Wlazły
Preceded by -	Best Receiver of FIVB World League; 2011	Succeeded by (Bulgaria) Todor Aleksiev
Preceded by (United States) Clayton Stanley	Most Valuable Player; Olympic Games; London 2012	Succeeded by (Brazil) Sérgio Santos
Preceded by -	Best Outside Spiker of FIVB World Championship; 2014 ex aequo (Brazil) Ricardo Lucarelli	Succeeded by TBD
