= André Nascimento (volleyball) =

Brazilian volleyball player (born 1979)

Personal information
- Full name: André Luiz da Silva Nascimento
- Born: 4 March 1979 (age 47); São João de Meriti, Brazil
- Height: 1.95 m (6 ft 5 in)
- Weight: 91 kg (201 lb)
- Spike: 340 cm (134 in)
- Block: 320 cm (126 in)

Volleyball information
- Position: Opposite hitter

Career
Years	Teams
1999–2002	Suzano
2002–2004	Panathinaikos Athens
2004–2005	Suzano
2005–2007	Trentino Volley
2007–2008	Modena Volley
2008–2011	Minas Tênis Clube
2011–2012	Suntory Sunbirds
2014	APAV Vôlei
2015–2016	Montes Claros Vôlei
2016–2017	Vôlei Itapetininga

National team
2001–2008	Brazil
Honours
Men's volleyball
Representing Brazil
Event	1st	2nd	3rd
Olympic Games	1	1	0
World Championship	2	0	0
World Cup	2	0	0
World Grand Champions Cup	1	1	0
World League	6	1	0
Pan American Games	1	0	1
Total	13	3	1
Olympic Games
Gold medal – first place	2004 Athens	Team
Silver medal – second place	2008 Beijing	Team
World Championship
Gold medal – first place	2002 Argentina	Team
Gold medal – first place	2006 Japan	Team
World Cup
Gold medal – first place	2003 Japan	Team
Gold medal – first place	2007 Japan	Team
World Grand Champions Cup
Gold medal – first place	2005 Japan	Team
Silver medal – second place	2001 Japan	Team
World League
Gold medal – first place	2001 Katowice	Team
Gold medal – first place	2003 Madrid	Team
Gold medal – first place	2004 Rome	Team
Gold medal – first place	2005 Belgrade	Team
Gold medal – first place	2006 Moscow	Team
Gold medal – first place	2007 Katowice	Team
Silver medal – second place	2002 Belo Horizonte	Team
Pan American Games
Gold medal – first place	2007 Rio de Janeiro	Team
Bronze medal – third place	2003 Santo Domingo	Team

André Luiz da Silva Nascimento (born 4 March 1979) is a Brazilian former volleyball player who won a gold medal at the 2004 Summer Olympics and a silver medal at the 2008 Summer Olympics.

He was born in São João de Meriti.

== Awards ==
=== Individuals ===
- 2002 FIVB World Championship "Best Spiker"
- 2005 FIVB World Grand Champions Cup "Most Valuable Player"
- 2005 FIVB World Grand Champions Cup "Best Scorer"
- 2006 World League "Best Server"

Awards
Preceded by (Argentina) Marcos Milinkovic	2002 FIVB World Championship's; Men's Best Spiker; 2002	Succeeded by (Brazil) Dante Amaral
