= 2007 FIVB Volleyball Men's World Cup =

Volleyball competition held in Japan

2007 Men's World Cup
Tournament details
- Host country: Japan
- Dates: 18 November – 2 December
- Teams: 12 (from 5 confederations)
- Venue: 8 (in 7 host cities)

Final positions
- Champions: Brazil (2nd title)
- Runners-up: Russia
- Third place: Bulgaria
- Fourth place: United States

Tournament awards
- MVP: (Brazil) Gilberto Godoy Filho

The 2007 FIVB Men's World Cup was held from 18 November to 2 December 2007 in Japan. The tournament was the first step in the qualification process for the 2008 Summer Olympics in Beijing, China. The top three teams qualified for the Olympics, and joined China as they had already secured a berth as the host country.

== Qualification ==
Means of qualification	Host	Date	Vacancies	Qualified
Host Country	—	―	1	Japan
2007 Men's European Volleyball Championship	6–16 September 2007	Russia	2	Spain
2007 Men's European Volleyball Championship	6–16 September 2007	Russia	2	Russia
2007 Men's NORCECA Volleyball Championship	16–21 September 2007	(United States) Anaheim	2	United States
2007 Men's NORCECA Volleyball Championship	16–21 September 2007	(United States) Anaheim	2	Puerto Rico
2007 Men's South American Volleyball Championship	5–9 September 2007	Chile	2	Brazil
2007 Men's South American Volleyball Championship	5–9 September 2007	Chile	2	Argentina
2007 Asian Men's Volleyball Championship	31 Aug – 9 Sep 2007	(Indonesia) Jakarta	1	Australia
2007 Men's African Volleyball Championship	16–22 September 2007	(South Africa) Durban	2	Egypt
2007 Men's African Volleyball Championship	16–22 September 2007	(South Africa) Durban	2	Tunisia
Wild Cards	―	―	2	South Korea
Wild Cards	―	―	2	Bulgaria
Total			12	

== Venues ==
Site	First round	Second round	Third round	Fourth round	2007 FIVB Volleyball Men's World Cup is located in Japan
A	Saitama	Hiroshima	Fukuoka	Tokyo	2007 FIVB Volleyball Men's World Cup is located in Japan
A	Saitama Super Arena	Hiroshima Green Arena	Marine Messe Fukuoka	Tokyo Metropolitan Gymnasium	2007 FIVB Volleyball Men's World Cup is located in Japan
A	Capacity: 22,500	Capacity: 4,750	Capacity: 15,000	Capacity: 10,000	2007 FIVB Volleyball Men's World Cup is located in Japan
B	Matsumoto	Toyama	Okayama	Tokyo	2007 FIVB Volleyball Men's World Cup is located in Japan
B	Matsumoto City Gymnasium	Toyama City Gymnasium	Okayama Momotaro Arena	Komazawa Gymnasium	2007 FIVB Volleyball Men's World Cup is located in Japan
B	Capacity: 6,000	Capacity: 5,000	Capacity: 11,000	Capacity: 3,875	2007 FIVB Volleyball Men's World Cup is located in Japan

== Format ==
The competition system of the 2007 World Cup for Men was the single Round-Robin system. Each team played once against each of the 11 other teams. Points were accumulated throughout the whole tournament. The final standing was determined by the number of points gained.

== Results ==
Pos	Team	Pld	W	L	Pts	SW	SL	SR	SPW	SPL	SPR
1	Brazil	11	10	1	21	30	4	7.500	852	673	1.266
2	Russia	11	9	2	20	29	9	3.222	899	742	1.212
3	Bulgaria	11	9	2	20	29	13	2.231	988	881	1.121
4	United States	11	8	3	19	28	12	2.333	947	843	1.123
5	Spain	11	7	4	18	22	15	1.467	848	825	1.028
6	Puerto Rico	11	5	6	16	21	19	1.105	878	869	1.010
7	Argentina	11	5	6	16	15	23	0.652	825	876	0.942
8	Australia	11	4	7	15	14	25	0.560	839	940	0.893
9	Japan	11	3	8	14	14	26	0.538	865	923	0.937
10	Egypt	11	3	8	14	13	27	0.481	829	922	0.899
11	South Korea	11	2	9	13	9	31	0.290	818	947	0.864
12	Tunisia	11	1	10	12	12	32	0.375	909	1056	0.861

All times are Japan Standard Time (UTC+09:00).

=== First round ===
==== Site A ====
Date	Time		Score		Set 1	Set 2	Set 3	Set 4	Set 5	Total	Report
18 Nov	13:00	Australia	3–2	South Korea	22–25	25–20	23–25	25–20	29–27	124–117	P2 P3
18 Nov	15:50	Argentina	0–3	Russia	16–25	22–25	17–25			55–75	P2 P3
18 Nov	18:30	Japan	2–3	Tunisia	25–22	21–25	25–18	22–25	14–16	107–106	P2 P3
19 Nov	12:30	Australia	0–3	Russia	22–25	26–28	10–25			58–78	P2 P3
19 Nov	15:00	Argentina	3–1	Tunisia	25–19	25–21	23–25	25–23		98–88	P2 P3
19 Nov	18:00	Japan	3–0	South Korea	25–15	25–20	25–21			75–56	P2 P3
20 Nov	12:30	Russia	3–1	Tunisia	22–25	25–15	25–12	25–16		97–68	P2 P3
20 Nov	15:00	Argentina	3–0	South Korea	26–24	25–22	25–20			76–66	P2 P3
20 Nov	18:00	Japan	0–3	Australia	19–25	21–25	21–25			61–75	P2 P3

==== Site B ====
Date	Time		Score		Set 1	Set 2	Set 3	Set 4	Set 5	Total	Report
18 Nov	12:30	Egypt	0–3	Puerto Rico	17–25	19–25	17–25			53–75	P2 P3
18 Nov	15:00	Bulgaria	3–1	Spain	25–21	19–25	25–20	25–17		94–83	P2 P3
18 Nov	18:00	United States	3-0	Brazil	28–26	30-28	25–20			83–46	P2 P3
19 Nov	13:00	Bulgaria	3–1	Egypt	25–19	25–18	23–25	25–18		98–80	P2 P3
19 Nov	15:30	Puerto Rico	3–1	United States	25–21	20–25	25–17	25–22		95–85	P2 P3
19 Nov	18:30	Brazil	3–0	Spain	30–28	25–17	25–16			80–61	P2 P3
20 Nov	13:00	Bulgaria	3–1	Puerto Rico	19–25	25–18	27–25	25–17		96–85	P2 P3
20 Nov	15:30	Spain	3–1	United States	21–25	25–20	27–25	25–20		98–90	P2 P3
20 Nov	18:30	Brazil	3–0	Egypt	25–18	25–14	25–17			75–49	P2 P3

=== Second round ===
==== Site A ====
Date	Time		Score		Set 1	Set 2	Set 3	Set 4	Set 5	Total	Report
22 Nov	12:30	South Korea	0–3	Russia	16–25	14–25	19–25			49–75	P2 P3
22 Nov	15:00	Australia	3–1	Tunisia	25–22	35–37	26–24	25–22		111–105	P2 P3
22 Nov	18:00	Japan	3–0	Argentina	25–23	25–19	26–24			76–66	P2 P3
23 Nov	12:30	South Korea	3–2	Tunisia	25–17	23–25	21–25	25–22	15–9	109–98	P2 P3
23 Nov	15:00	Argentina	3–1	Australia	25–21	21–25	25–14	25–23		96–83	P2 P3
23 Nov	18:00	Japan	0–3	Russia	19–25	20–25	23–25			62–75	P2 P3

==== Site B ====
Date	Time		Score		Set 1	Set 2	Set 3	Set 4	Set 5	Total	Report
22 Nov	13:30	Egypt	0–3	Spain	19–25	21–25	19–25			59–75	P2 P3
22 Nov	15:30	Brazil	3–0	Puerto Rico	25–13	25–21	25–17			75–51	P2 P3
22 Nov	18:30	United States	3–2	Bulgaria	29–27	20–25	28–30	25–22	15–12	117–116	P2 P3
23 Nov	12:00	Puerto Rico	3–0	Spain	25–18	25–22	25–18			75–58	P2 P3
23 Nov	15:00	Brazil	3–0	Bulgaria	25–14	25–21	25–19			75–54	P2 P3
23 Nov	18:00	Egypt	0–3	United States	22–25	18–25	19–25			59–75	P2 P3

=== Third round ===
==== Site A ====
Date	Time		Score		Set 1	Set 2	Set 3	Set 4	Set 5	Total	Report
25 Nov	12:30	Argentina	3–2	Puerto Rico	19–25	22–25	25–16	25–21	15–13	106–100	P2 P3
25 Nov	15:00	Spain	0–3	Russia	21–25	13–25	15–25			49–75	P2 P3
25 Nov	18:00	Japan	3–2	Egypt	25–17	19–25	21–25	25–23	15–9	105–99	P2 P3
26 Nox	15:00	Spain	3–0	Argentina	26–24	25–22	25–18			76–64	P2 P3
26 Nov	15:00	Egypt	0–3	Russia	19–25	18–25	19–25			56–75	P2 P3
26 Nov	18:00	Japan	0–3	Puerto Rico	23–25	23–25	21–25			67–75	P2 P3
27 Nov	12:30	Argentina	3–1	Egypt	25–22	25–19	16–25	25–21		91–87	P2 P3
27 Nov	15:00	Puerto Rico	0–3	Russia	22–25	21–25	19–25			62–75	P2 P3
27 Nov	18:00	Japan	1–3	Spain	26–24	19–25	18–25	19–25		82–99	P2 P3

==== Site B ====
Date	Time		Score		Set 1	Set 2	Set 3	Set 4	Set 5	Total	Report
25 Nov	12:30	Tunisia	1–3	United States	25–22	19–25	19–25	17–25		80–97	P2 P3
25 Nov	15:00	Bulgaria	3–0	South Korea	25–20	25–20	25–19			75–59	P2 P3
25 Nov	18:00	Brazil	3–0	Australia	25–19	25–19	25–21			75–59	P2 P3
26 Nov	13:00	South Korea	0–3	United States	18–25	15–25	18–25			51–75	P2 P3
26 Nov	15:30	Australia	0–3	Bulgaria	17–25	19–25	13–25			49–75	P2 P3
26 Nov	18:30	Brazil	3–0	Tunisia	25–19	25–16	25–21			75–56	P2 P3
27 Nov	13:00	Australia	0–3	United States	17–25	12–25	19–25			48–75	P2 P3
27 Nov	15:30	Bulgaria	3–1	Tunisia	26–24	22–25	25–15	25–17		98–81	P2 P3
27 Nov	18:30	Brazil	3–0	South Korea	25–20	25–17	25–20			75–57	P2 P3

=== Fourth round ===
==== Site A ====
Date	Time		Score		Set 1	Set 2	Set 3	Set 4	Set 5	Total	Report
30 Nov	14:00	Argentina	0–3	Brazil	20–25	22–25	16–25			58–75	P2 P3
30 Nov	16:30	Bulgaria	3–2	Russia	25–21	23–25	25–22	22–25	15–12	110–105	P2 P3
30 Nov	19:30	Japan	0–3	United States	18–25	25–27	19–25			62–77	P2 P3
1 Dec	14:00	Argentina	0–3	United States	16–25	19–25	18–25			53–75	P2 P3
1 Dec	16:30	Brazil	3–0	Russia	25–22	25–22	25–18			75–62	P2 P3
1 Dec	19:30	Japan	1–3	Bulgaria	25–22	20–25	20–25	20–25		85–97	P2 P3
2 Dec	14:00	Argentina	0–3	Bulgaria	17–25	22–25	23–25			62–75	P2 P3
2 Dec	16:30	Russia	3–2	United States	25–23	20–25	22–25	25–17	15–8	107–98	P2 P3
2 Dec	19:30	Japan	1–3	Brazil	25–23	21–25	19–25	18–25		83–98	P2 P3

==== Site B ====
Date	Time		Score		Set 1	Set 2	Set 3	Set 4	Set 5	Total	Report
30 Nov	12:30	Puerto Rico	3–0	Tunisia	25–17	25–17	25–23			75–57	P2 P3
30 Nov	15:00	Egypt	3–1	South Korea	21–25	25–16	25–19	25–22		96–82	P2 P3
30 Nov	18:00	Spain	3-0	Australia	25–21	25-19	25–20			75–41	P2 P3
1 Dec	12:30	Egypt	3–1	Tunisia	25–21	18–25	25–21	25–22		93–89	P2 P3
1 Dec	15:00	Spain	3–0	South Korea	25–22	25–17	28–26			78–65	P2 P3
1 Dec	18:00	Australia	3–1	Puerto Rico	25–21	15–25	25–18	25–21		90–85	P2 P3
2 Dec	12:00	Spain	3–1	Tunisia	25–16	25–22	21–25	25–18		96–81	P2 P3
2 Dec	14:30	South Korea	3–2	Puerto Rico	21–25	25–18	26–24	20–25	15–8	107–100	P2 P3
2 Dec	17:30	Australia	1–3	Egypt	14–25	25–23	21–25	22–25		82–98	P2 P3

== Final standing ==
Rank	Team
1st place, gold medalist(s)	Brazil
2nd place, silver medalist(s)	Russia
3rd place, bronze medalist(s)	Bulgaria
4	United States
5	Spain
6	Puerto Rico
7	Argentina
8	Australia
9	Japan
10	Egypt
11	South Korea
12	Tunisia

Qualified for the 2008 Summer Olympics

2007 Men's World Cup champions

Brazil
2nd title

Team roster
Bruno, Marcelinho, André Heller, Samuel, Giba (c), Murilo, André, Sérgio, Anderson, Gustavo, Rodrigão, Dante
Head coach
Bernardinho

== Awards ==
- Most Valuable Player
  (Brazil) Gilberto Godoy Filho
- Best Scorer
  (Puerto Rico) Héctor Soto
- Best Spiker
  (Brazil) Dante Amaral
- Best Blocker
  (Spain) José Luis Moltó
- Best Server
  (Russia) Semen Poltavskiy
- Best Setter
  (Spain) Miguel Angel Falasca
- Best Libero
  (Brazil) Sérgio Santos
