= 2007 FIVB Volleyball World League =

International sport competition

2007 World League
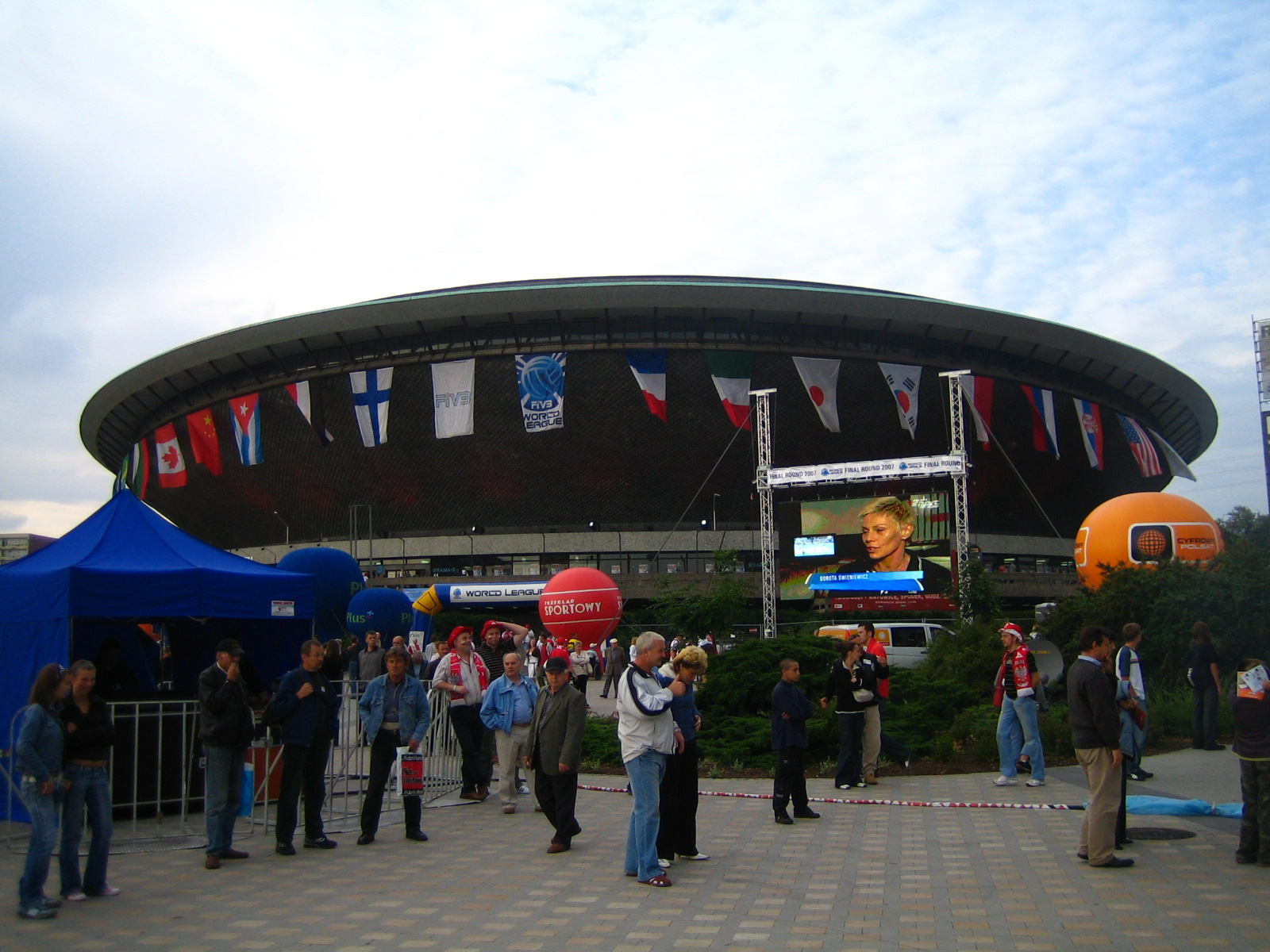
- The Spodek hosted the final round

Tournament details
- Host country: Poland (Final)
- Dates: 25 May – 15 July
- Teams: 16

Final positions
- Champions: Brazil (7th title)

Tournament awards
- MVP: (Brazil) Ricardo Garcia

The 2007 FIVB Volleyball World League was the 18th edition of the annual men's international volleyball tournament, played by 16 countries from 25 May to 15 July 2007. The Final Round was held in Katowice, Poland.

== Pools composition ==
Pool A	Pool B	Pool C	Pool D
Brazil; Canada; South Korea; Finland	France; United States; Japan; Italy	Russia; Cuba; Egypt; Serbia	Bulgaria; Argentina; China; Poland

== Intercontinental round ==
- The Final Round hosts Poland, the winners of each pool and a wild card chosen by the FIVB would qualify for the Final Round. If Poland were ranked first in Pool D, the second-ranked team of Pool D would qualify for the Final Round. Since Poland were ranked first in Pool D, the second-ranked Bulgaria also qualified.

=== Pool A ===
Pos	Team	Pld	W	L	Pts	SW	SL	SR	SPW	SPL	SPR	Qualification
1	Brazil	12	12	0	24	36	5	7.200	1008	826	1.220	Final round
2	Finland	12	7	5	19	24	22	1.091	1043	1025	1.018	
3	South Korea	12	3	9	15	17	28	0.607	962	1065	0.903	
4	Canada	12	2	10	14	10	32	0.313	913	1010	0.904	

Date		Score		Set 1	Set 2	Set 3	Set 4	Set 5	Total	Report
25 May	Canada	3–1	Finland	18–25	25–20	28–26	25–18		96–89	P2 P3
26 May	South Korea	0–3	Brazil	17–25	23–25	26–28			66–78	P2 P3
26 May	Canada	1–3	Finland	25–19	22–25	24–26	19–25		90–95	P2 P3
27 May	South Korea	2–3	Brazil	25–23	19–25	29–27	23–25	15–17	111–117	P2 P3
1 Jun	Brazil	3–1	Finland	25–17	25–14	20–25	25–19		95–75	P2 P3
2 Jun	South Korea	3–1	Canada	26–24	26–24	20–25	25–23		97–96	P2 P3
2 Jun	Brazil	3–0	Finland	25–15	25–19	25–20			75–54	P2 P3
3 Jun	South Korea	3–0	Canada	25–19	25–23	25–19			75–61	P2 P3
8 Jun	Brazil	3–0	South Korea	25–19	25–16	25–15			75–50	P2 P3
8 Jun	Finland	3–0	Canada	25–23	25–15	25–18			75–56	P2 P3
9 Jun	Brazil	3–0	South Korea	25–22	25–19	25–14			75–55	P2 P3
9 Jun	Finland	3–1	Canada	26–24	24–26	25–18	25–23		100–91	P2 P3
15 Jun	Brazil	3–0	Canada	25–21	25–20	25–13			75–54	P2 P3
15 Jun	Finland	3–1	South Korea	25–22	26–24	22–25	25–19		98–90	P2 P3
16 Jun	Brazil	3–1	Canada	25–14	20–25	25–22	25–18		95–79	P2 P3
16 Jun	Finland	3–1	South Korea	22–25	25–19	25–22	25–17		97–83	P2 P3
22 Jun	Canada	0–3	Brazil	18–25	23–25	21–25			62–75	P2 P3
23 Jun	South Korea	1–3	Finland	16–25	19–25	26–24	14–25		75–99	P2 P3
23 Jun	Canada	0–3	Brazil	23–25	22–25	22–25			67–75	P2 P3
24 Jun	South Korea	2–3	Finland	25–21	20–25	25–22	19–25	12–15	101–108	P2 P3
29 Jun	Finland	0–3	Brazil	21–25	22–25	23–25			66–75	P2 P3
29 Jun	Canada	3–1	South Korea	25–19	21–25	25–21	25–19		96–84	P2 P3
30 Jun	Finland	1–3	Brazil	20–25	25–23	21–25	21–25		87–98	P2 P3
30 Jun	Canada	0–3	South Korea	20–25	22–25	23–25			65–75	P2 P3

=== Pool B ===
Pos	Team	Pld	W	L	Pts	SW	SL	SR	SPW	SPL	SPR	Qualification
1	United States	12	10	2	22	33	12	2.750	1110	1003	1.107	Final round
2	France (Note: Qualified as wild card)	12	7	5	19	28	23	1.217	1156	1125	1.028	Final round
3	Italy	12	4	8	16	19	30	0.633	1097	1152	0.952	
4	Japan	12	3	9	15	17	32	0.531	1048	1131	0.927	

Notes:

Date		Score		Set 1	Set 2	Set 3	Set 4	Set 5	Total	Report
26 May	United States	2–3	France	25–13	19–25	17–25	26–24	13–15	100–102	P2 P3
27 May	United States	3–1	France	25–22	25–22	22–25	25–20		97–89	P2 P3
1 Jun	Italy	3–2	France	25–20	25–20	22–25	15–25	17–15	104–105	P2 P3
1 Jun	United States	3–1	Japan	25–17	23–25	27–25	25–19		100–86	P2 P3
2 Jun	United States	3–1	Japan	20–25	25–22	25–22	25–18		95–87	P2 P3
3 Jun	Italy	0–3	France	20–25	23–25	26–28			69–78	P2 P3
8 Jun	France	3–1	United States	25–22	19–25	38–36	25–18		107–101	P2 P3
9 Jun	Japan	1–3	Italy	25–17	18–25	20–25	21–25		84–92	P2 P3
9 Jun	France	1–3	United States	25–22	27–29	23–25	21–25		96–101	P2 P3
10 Jun	Japan	3–2	Italy	26–24	25–22	22–25	31–33	15–13	119–117	P2 P3
15 Jun	United States	3–1	Italy	25–21	25–21	25–27	29–27		104–96	P2 P3
16 Jun	France	3–0	Japan	25–19	25–22	25–20			75–61	P2 P3
16 Jun	United States	3–0	Italy	25–19	30–28	25–23			80–70	P2 P3
17 Jun	France	3–2	Japan	25–13	25–19	22–25	20–25	15–12	107–94	P2 P3
22 Jun	France	2–3	Italy	25–23	18–25	19–25	25–23	17–19	104–115	P2 P3
23 Jun	Japan	0–3	United States	17–25	23–25	15–25			55–75	P2 P3
23 Jun	France	3–1	Italy	25–23	25–20	25–27	25–14		100–84	P2 P3
24 Jun	Japan	0–3	United States	23–25	22–25	22–25			67–75	P2 P3
29 Jun	Italy	1–3	United States	18–25	25–23	16–25	29–31		88–104	P2 P3
30 Jun	Japan	2–3	France	26–24	25–19	19–25	24–26	11–15	105–109	P2 P3
1 Jul	Japan	3–1	France	19–25	25–20	25–19	25–20		94–84	P2 P3
1 Jul	Italy	0–3	United States	26–28	21–25	13–25			60–78	P2 P3
6 Jul	Italy	2–3	Japan	21–25	21–25	25–19	25–23	11–15	103–107	P2 P3
8 Jul	Italy	3–1	Japan	25–21	27–25	22–25	25–18		99–89	P2 P3

=== Pool C ===
Pos	Team	Pld	W	L	Pts	SW	SL	SR	SPW	SPL	SPR	Qualification
1	Russia	12	10	2	22	31	10	3.100	1022	898	1.138	Final round
2	Cuba	12	7	5	19	26	19	1.368	1047	990	1.058	
3	Serbia	12	7	5	19	24	18	1.333	968	977	0.991	
4	Egypt	12	0	12	12	2	36	0.056	796	968	0.822	

Date		Score		Set 1	Set 2	Set 3	Set 4	Set 5	Total	Report
25 May	Cuba	3–1	Egypt	25–17	25–20	22–25	25–21		97–83	P2 P3
26 May	Russia	3–0	Serbia	29–27	25–14	25–21			79–62	P2 P3
26 May	Cuba	3–0	Egypt	25–18	25–22	25–19			75–59	P2 P3
27 May	Russia	3–1	Serbia	25–21	25–23	21–25	30–28		101–97	P2 P3
1 Jun	Serbia	3–0	Egypt	25–23	25–19	32–30			82–72	P2 P3
1 Jun	Cuba	2–3	Russia	26–24	23–25	15–25	25–20	13–15	102–109	P2 P3
2 Jun	Serbia	3–0	Egypt	28–26	25–20	25–22			78–68	P2 P3
2 Jun	Cuba	3–1	Russia	27–25	25–19	21–25	30–28		103–97	P2 P3
8 Jun	Egypt	0–3	Russia	15–25	34–36	19–25			68–86	P2 P3
8 Jun	Cuba	3–2	Serbia	25–19	22–25	28–30	25–17	15–12	115–103	P2 P3
9 Jun	Cuba	1–3	Serbia	23–25	23–25	32–30	21–25		99–105	P2 P3
10 Jun	Egypt	0–3	Russia	19–25	22–25	22–25			63–75	P2 P3
16 Jun	Russia	3–0	Egypt	25–19	25–8	25–15			75–42	P2 P3
16 Jun	Serbia	3–2	Cuba	15–25	18–25	25–19	27–25	15–6	100–100	P2 P3
17 Jun	Russia	3–1	Egypt	24–26	26–24	25–17	25–22		100–89	P2 P3
17 Jun	Serbia	0–3	Cuba	18–25	16–25	16–25			50–75	P2 P3
22 Jun	Egypt	0–3	Serbia	22–25	22–25	18–25			62–75	P2 P3
23 Jun	Russia	3–0	Cuba	26–24	30–28	25–15			81–67	P2 P3
24 Jun	Russia	3–0	Cuba	25–16	25–21	29–27			79–64	P2 P3
24 Jun	Egypt	0–3	Serbia	23–25	20–25	23–25			66–75	P2 P3
29 Jun	Egypt	0–3	Cuba	22–25	20–25	20–25			62–75	P2 P3
29 Jun	Serbia	0–3	Russia	31–33	23–25	12–25			66–83	P2 P3
1 Jul	Egypt	0–3	Cuba	23–25	17–25	22–25			62–75	P2 P3
1 Jul	Serbia	3–0	Russia	25–22	25–16	25–19			75–57	P2 P3

=== Pool D ===
Pos	Team	Pld	W	L	Pts	SW	SL	SR	SPW	SPL	SPR	Qualification
1	Poland (Note: Qualified as hosts) (H)	12	12	0	24	36	11	3.273	1133	995	1.139	Final round
2	Bulgaria	12	8	4	20	28	15	1.867	1013	929	1.090	Final round
3	China	12	4	8	16	18	29	0.621	1007	1076	0.936	
4	Argentina	12	0	12	12	9	36	0.250	913	1066	0.856	

(H) Host
Notes:

Date		Score		Set 1	Set 2	Set 3	Set 4	Set 5	Total	Report
25 May	Poland	3–0	China	25–20	25–16	25–21			75–57	P2 P3
26 May	Poland	3–2	China	24–26	25–20	23–25	25–16	15–13	112–100	P2 P3
26 May	Bulgaria	3–0	Argentina	25–22	25–21	25–19			75–62	P2 P3
27 May	Bulgaria	3–0	Argentina	25–14	25–19	25–23			75–56	P2 P3
1 Jun	Poland	3–1	Argentina	23–25	27–25	25–17	25–23		100–90	P2 P3
1 Jun	Bulgaria	3–1	China	25–16	19–25	25–22	25–17		94–80	P2 P3
3 Jun	Bulgaria	3–0	China	25–18	25–16	25–21			75–55	P2 P3
3 Jun	Poland	3–0	Argentina	25–16	25–22	25–18			75–56	P2 P3
9 Jun	China	1–3	Poland	28–26	14–25	18–25	17–25		77–101	P2 P3
9 Jun	Argentina	2–3	Bulgaria	25–20	21–25	25–21	18–25	13–15	102–106	P2 P3
10 Jun	China	2–3	Poland	25–20	25–19	20–25	29–31	14–16	113–111	P2 P3
10 Jun	Argentina	0–3	Bulgaria	19–25	18–25	13–25			50–75	P2 P3
16 Jun	China	0–3	Bulgaria	23–25	24–26	18–25			65–76	P2 P3
16 Jun	Argentina	1–3	Poland	29–31	12–25	25–17	18–25		84–98	P2 P3
17 Jun	China	0–3	Bulgaria	22–25	24–26	27–29			73–80	P2 P3
17 Jun	Argentina	0–3	Poland	21–25	23–25	17–25			61–75	P2 P3
23 Jun	China	3–0	Argentina	25–17	25–17	25–21			75–55	P2 P3
23 Jun	Bulgaria	1–3	Poland	25–21	19–25	23–25	23–25		90–96	P2 P3
24 Jun	China	3–2	Argentina	22–25	25–22	25–19	23–25	15–11	110–102	P2 P3
24 Jun	Bulgaria	1–3	Poland	23–25	22–25	25–20	20–25		90–95	P2 P3
29 Jun	Poland	3–1	Bulgaria	22–25	25–23	25–22	25–16		97–86	P2 P3
29 Jun	Argentina	2–3	China	20–25	25–16	25–23	15–25	13–15	98–104	P2 P3
30 Jun	Poland	3–1	Bulgaria	23–25	25–20	25–23	25–23		98–91	P2 P3
1 Jul	Argentina	1–3	China	25–18	21–25	26–28	25–27		97–98	P2 P3

== Final round ==
- Venue: Spodek, Katowice, Poland
- All times are Central European Summer Time (UTC+02:00).

=== Pool play ===
==== Pool E ====
Pos	Team	Pld	W	L	Pts	SW	SL	SR	SPW	SPL	SPR	Qualification
1	Poland	2	2	0	4	6	2	3.000	204	197	1.036	Semifinals
2	United States	2	1	1	3	3	3	1.000	157	153	1.026	Semifinals
3	France	2	0	2	2	2	6	0.333	185	196	0.944	

Date	Time		Score		Set 1	Set 2	Set 3	Set 4	Set 5	Total	Report
11 Jul	20:08	Poland	3–2	France	38–36	19–25	21–25	25–21	15–11	118–118	P2 P3
12 Jul	20:07	France	0–3	United States	21–25	20–25	26–28			67–78	P2 P3
13 Jul	20:07	Poland	3–0	United States	25–22	36–34	25–23			86–79	P2 P3

==== Pool F ====
Pos	Team	Pld	W	L	Pts	SW	SL	SR	SPW	SPL	SPR	Qualification
1	Russia	2	1	1	3	4	3	1.333	167	163	1.025	Semifinals
2	Brazil	2	1	1	3	5	4	1.250	203	199	1.020	Semifinals
3	Bulgaria	2	1	1	3	3	5	0.600	172	180	0.956	

Date	Time		Score		Set 1	Set 2	Set 3	Set 4	Set 5	Total	Report
11 Jul	17:07	Brazil	2–3	Bulgaria	25–21	20–25	25–21	23–25	12–15	105–107	P2 P3
12 Jul	17:07	Bulgaria	0–3	Russia	23–25	21–25	21–25			65–75	P2 P3
13 Jul	17:07	Russia	1–3	Brazil	25–22	23–25	20–25	24–26		92–98	P2 P3

=== Final four ===
Semifinals
14 July
Russia	3
United States	1
14 July
Poland	1
Brazil	3

Final
15 July
Russia	1
Brazil	3
3rd place match
15 July
Poland	1
United States	3

==== Semifinals ====
Date	Time		Score		Set 1	Set 2	Set 3	Set 4	Set 5	Total	Report
14 Jul	17:07	Russia	3–1	United States	25–22	17–25	25–13	25–21		92–81	P2 P3
14 Jul	20:07	Poland	1–3	Brazil	23–25	25–23	21–25	23–25		92–98	P2 P3

==== 3rd place match ====
Date	Time		Score		Set 1	Set 2	Set 3	Set 4	Set 5	Total	Report
15 Jul	17:07	Poland	1–3	United States	19–25	21–25	25–22	19–25		84–97	P2 P3

==== Final ====
Date	Time		Score		Set 1	Set 2	Set 3	Set 4	Set 5	Total	Report
15 Jul	20:07	Russia	1–3	Brazil	25–18	23–25	26–28	22–25		96–96	P2 P3

== Final standing ==
Rank	Team
1st place, gold medalist(s)	Brazil
2nd place, silver medalist(s)	Russia
3rd place, bronze medalist(s)	United States
4	Poland
5	Bulgaria
6	France
7	Cuba
7	Finland
9	China
9	Italy
9	Serbia
9	South Korea
13	Argentina
13	Canada
13	Egypt
13	Japan

2007 World League champions

Brazil
7th title

12-man Roster for Final Round
Marcelinho, André Heller, Samuel, Giba, Murilo, André, Sérgio, Anderson, Gustavo, Rodrigão, Ricardo, Dante
Head coach
Bernardinho

== Awards ==
- Most valuable player
  (Brazil) Ricardo Garcia
- Best scorer
  (Russia) Semyon Poltavskiy
- Best spiker
  (Russia) Yury Berezhko
- Best blocker
  (Brazil) Gustavo Endres
- Best server
  (Russia) Semyon Poltavskiy
- Best setter
  (Poland) Paweł Zagumny
- Best libero
  (United States) Richard Lambourne
