= Ricardo Garcia (volleyball) =

Brazilian volleyball player (born 1975)

Personal information
- Full name: Ricardo Bermudez Garcia
- Born: 19 November 1975 (age 50); São Paulo, Brazil
- Height: 1.91 m (6 ft 3 in)
- Weight: 89 kg (196 lb)
- Spike: 337 cm (133 in)
- Block: 320 cm (126 in)

Volleyball information
- Position: Setter
- Current club: Retired

Career
Years	Teams
2003–2004	Minas Tênis Clube
2004–2008	Modena Volley
2008–2010	Volley Treviso
2010–2013	Vôlei Futuro
2013–2018	Maringá Vôlei

National team
1997–2018	Brazil
Honours
Men's volleyball
Representing Brazil
Event	1st	2nd	3rd
Olympic Games	1	1	0
World Championship	2	0	0
World Cup	1	0	0
World Grand Champions Cup	2	1	0
World League	6	1	0
Pan American Games	0	0	1
Total	12	3	1
Olympic Games
Gold medal – first place	2004 Athens	Team
Silver medal – second place	2012 London	Team
World Championship
Gold medal – first place	2002 Argentina	Team
Gold medal – first place	2006 Japan	Team
World Cup
Gold medal – first place	2003 Japan	
World Grand Champions Cup
Gold medal – first place	1997 Japan	Team
Gold medal – first place	2005 Japan	Team
Silver medal – second place	2001 Japan	Team
World League
Gold medal – first place	2001 Katowice	Team
Gold medal – first place	2003 Madrid	
Gold medal – first place	2004 Rome	
Gold medal – first place	2005 Belgrade	
Gold medal – first place	2006 Moscow	
Gold medal – first place	2007 Katowice	
Silver medal – second place	2002 Belo Horizonte	
Pan American Games
Bronze medal – third place	2003 Santo Domingo	Team

Ricardo Bermudez Garcia (Note: This name uses Portuguese naming customs: the first or maternal family name is Bermudez and the second or paternal family name is Garcia.) (born 19 November 1975), known as Ricardinho, is a Brazilian volleyball player. He competed in the 2004 Summer Olympics.

Ricardinho was born in São Paulo. In 2004, he was part of the Brazilian team which won the gold medal in the Olympic tournament. He played all eight matches.

In 2007, Ricardinho was dismissed from the team, reportedly because of conflicts with other team members. He rejoined the team for the 2012 Olympics in London where they won the silver medal.

== Sporting achievements ==
=== Individuals ===
- 2004 FIVB World League – Best Setter
- 2004 Summer Olympics – Best Setter
- 2005 America's Cup – Best Setter
- 2005 FIVB World Grand Champions Cup – Best Setter
- 2007 FIVB World League – Most Valuable Player
