= Bernardo Rezende =

Brazilian volleyball coach and former player

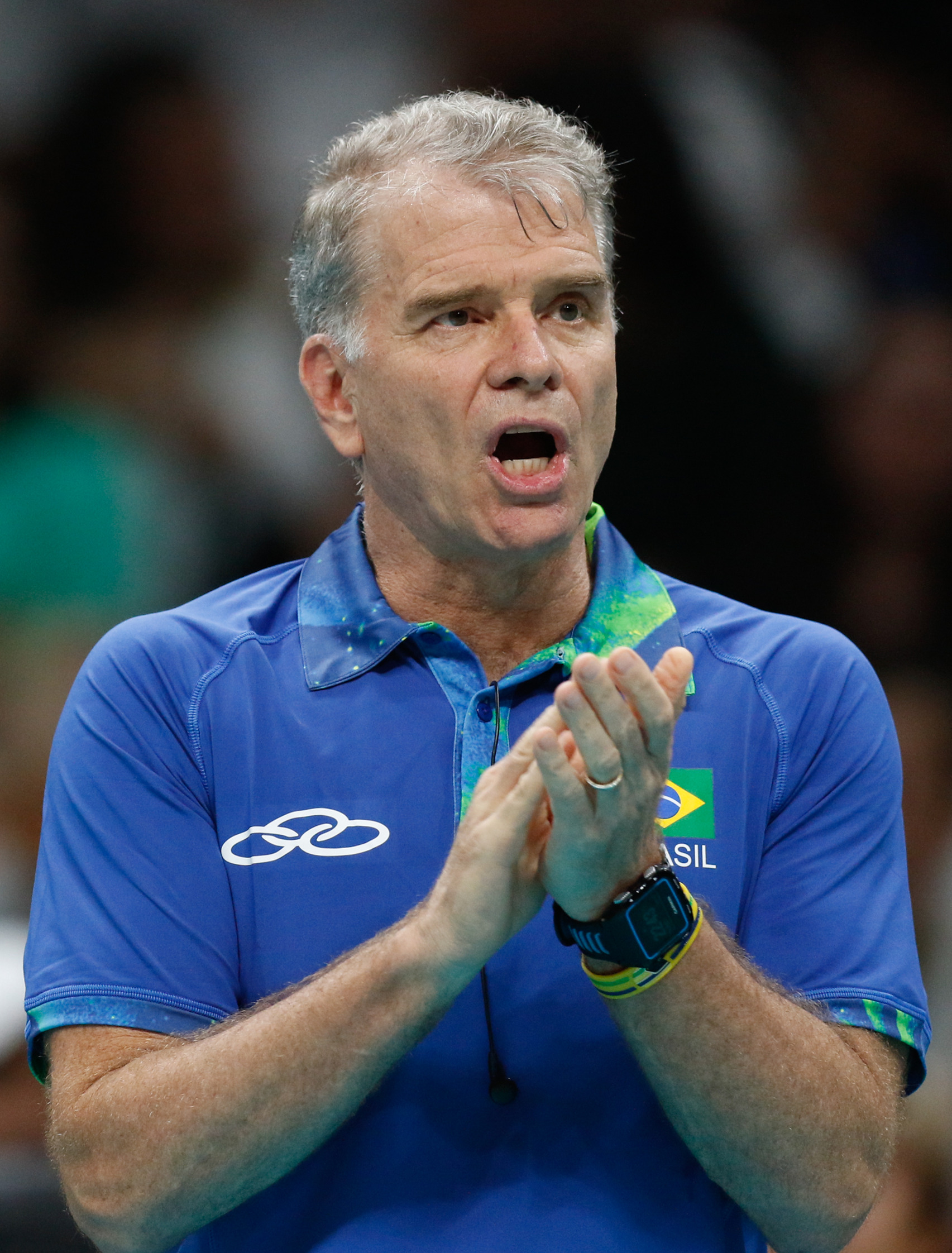
- Bernardinho at the 2016 Olympics

Personal information
- Full name: Bernardo Rocha de Rezende
- Nickname: Bernardinho
- Born: 25 August 1959 (age 67); Rio de Janeiro, Brazil
- Hometown: Rio de Janeiro Brazil
- Height: 185 cm (6 ft 1 in)
- Weight: 80 kg (176 lb)

Coaching information
- Current team: Rio de Janeiro VC (since 2004)
Previous teams coached
Years	Teams
1990–1992; 1994–2000; 2001–2017; 2004– 2021–2022; 2023–	Pallavolo Sirio Perugia; Brazil Women; Brazil Men; Rio de Janeiro VC; France; Brazil Men
Honours
Men's volleyball
Representing Brazil (player)
Olympic Games
Silver medal – second place	1984 Los Angeles	Team
World Championship
Silver medal – second place	1982 Argentina
FIVB World Cup
Bronze medal – third place	1981 Japan
Pan American Games
Gold medal – first place	1983 Caracas	Team
CSV South American Championship
Gold medal – first place	1981 Santiago
Gold medal – first place	1983 São Paulo
Men's volleyball
Representing Brazil (coach)
Olympic Games
Gold medal – first place	2004 Athens	Team
Gold medal – first place	2016 Rio de Janeiro	Team
Silver medal – second place	2008 Beijing	Team
Silver medal – second place	2012 London	Team
World Championship
Gold medal – first place	2002 Argentina
Gold medal – first place	2006 Japan
Gold medal – first place	2010 Italy
Silver medal – second place	2014 Poland
World Cup
Gold medal – first place	2003 Japan
Gold medal – first place	2007 Japan
Bronze medal – third place	2011 Japan
World League
Gold medal – first place	2001 Katowice
Gold medal – first place	2003 Madrid
Gold medal – first place	2004 Rome
Gold medal – first place	2005 Belgrade
Gold medal – first place	2006 Moscow
Gold medal – first place	2007 Katowice
Gold medal – first place	2009 Belgrade
Silver medal – second place	2002 Belo Horizonte
Silver medal – second place	2011 Gdańsk
Silver medal – second place	2016 Kraków
World Grand Champions Cup
Gold medal – first place	2005 Japan
Gold medal – first place	2009 Japan
Gold medal – first place	2013 Japan
Pan American Games
Gold medal – first place	2007 Rio de Janeiro	Team
Gold medal – first place	2011 Guadalajara	Team
Bronze medal – third place	2003 Santo Domingo	Team
South American Championship
Gold medal – first place	2001 Colombia
Gold medal – first place	2003 Brazil
Gold medal – first place	2005 Brazil
Gold medal – first place	2007 Chile
Gold medal – first place	2009 Colombia
Gold medal – first place	2011 Brazil
Gold medal – first place	2015 Brazil
Women's volleyball
Representing Brazil (coach)
Olympic Games
Bronze medal – third place	1996 Atlanta	Team
Bronze medal – third place	2000 Sydney	Team
World Championship
Silver medal – second place	1994 Brazil
World Cup
Silver medal – second place	1995 Japan
World Grand Champions Cup
Bronze medal – third place	1997 Japan

Bernardo Rocha de Rezende (born 25 August 1959), known as Bernardo Rezende and nicknamed Bernardinho, is a Brazilian volleyball coach and former player. He is the current coach of the female volleyball team Rio de Janeiro Vôlei Clube. Rezende is one of the most successful coaches in the history of volleyball, accumulating more than 30 major titles in a twenty-year career directing the Brazilian male and female national teams.

Rezende has won two Olympic gold medals during his coaching career, as head coach of Brazil men's national volleyball team at 2004 Athens and 2016 Rio Olympics. He also won two bronze medals as head coach of Brazil women's national volleyball team at the 1996 Atlanta and 2000 Sydney Olympics. He is the first and only head coach to lead national teams to win six Olympics medals. As of 2021, with 48 medals overall, he is the most successful team sport coach of all time.

He was inducted into the International Volleyball Hall of Fame in 2022.

== Career ==
=== Player ===
Rezende played volleyball from 1979 to 1985, and competed in two Olympics, winning a silver medal at the 1984 Summer Olympics. He also finished fifth at the 1980 Summer Olympics and won a gold medal at the 1983 Pan American Games. Rezende played in Fluminense, Volley Atlantica Boavista, Flamengo and Vasco da Gama from 1972 to 1988. With Atlântica Boavista he was the winner of Brazil Super League in 1981.

=== Coach ===
In 1988, Rezende stopped playing to work started his coaching career as an assistant to Bebeto de Freitas at the 1988 Summer Olympics. In 1990 he became the coach of Italian women's team Perugia, and remained there for two years. In 1990 he became coach of Brazil women's team. That year, Brazil placed second in the FIVB World Championship and won the FIVB World Grand Prix.

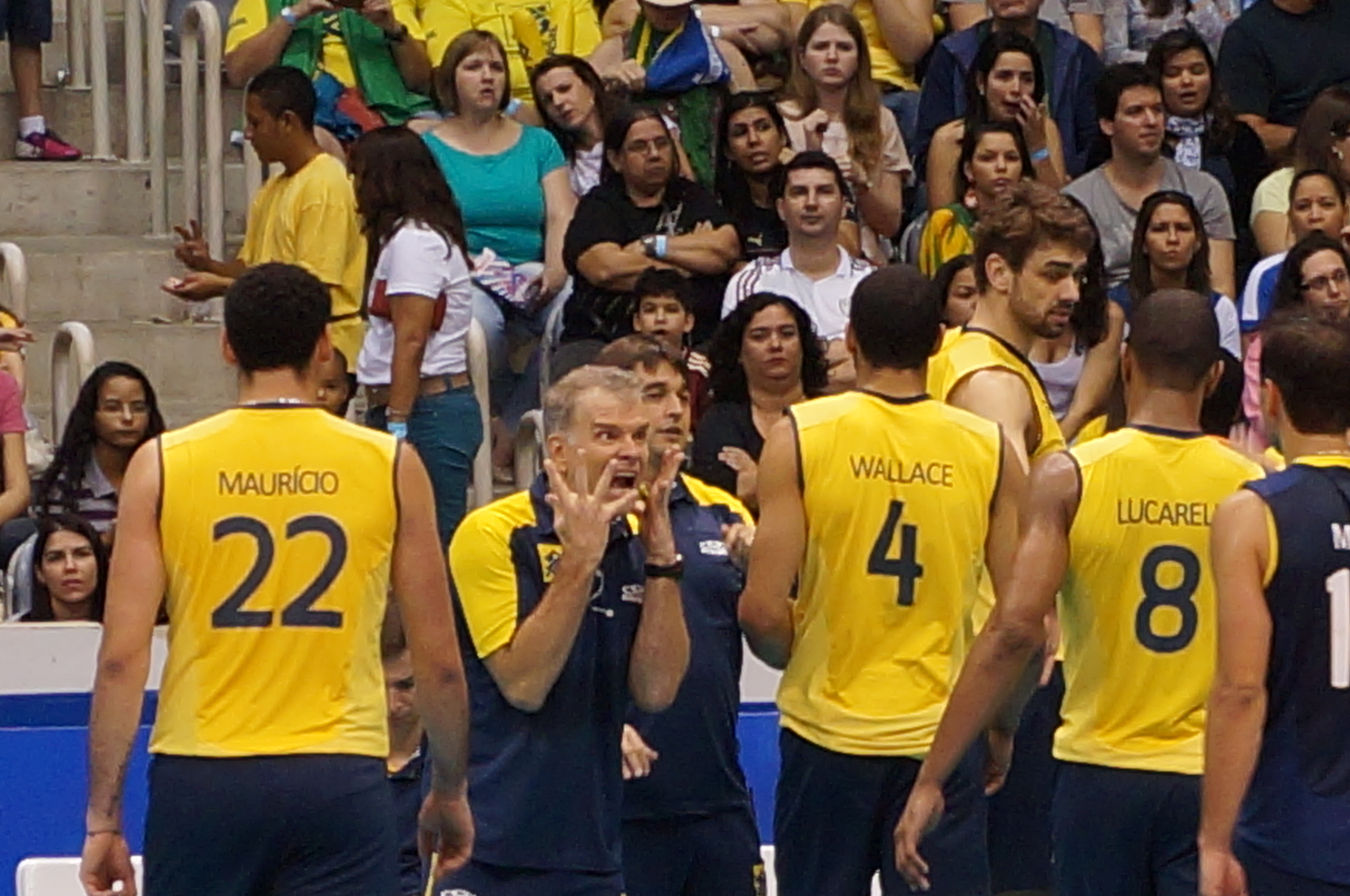
Rezende at FIVB World League 2013

In 1996, the team won the bronze medal at the Atlanta Olympic Games and the gold medal at the FIVB World Grand Prix. In 1998 Rezende led the Brazilians to a South American title, earned qualification for the FIVB World Championship and won bronze in the FIVB World Grand Championship Cup in Japan. In 1999, Rezende won the gold medal at the Pan American Games in Winnipeg, a silver medal in the FIVB World Grand Prix, gold in the South American Championship for the third time, and bronze at the FIVB World Cup. In 2000, he led Brazil to third place in the FIVB World Grand Prix, and also to third place at the Olympic Games in Sydney 2000. Rezende left as coach of the women's team in 2000.

Since 2001, Rezende has been the coach of the Brazilian male national team, with whom he won two Olympic titles in 2004 and 2016. After this success Rezende accepted the challenge of leading the Brazilian men in 2001. Bernardinho led the team to memorable victories including first place in the 2001 and 2003 editions of the FIVB World League, and the gold medal at the 2002 FIVB World Championship. In 2003, Rezende's star shone even stronger. He guided the team to titles in the FIVB World League and the FIVB World Cup, and bronze at the Pan American Games in Dominican Republic. In July 2004, Brazil claimed their fourth FIVB World League title. In August, the team won its second Olympic gold medal in Athens and make new historic team. Bernardinho returned at the end of the year to the Superliga to coach Rexona-Ades.

In 2005, still coaching the Brazilian men team, Rezende earned another four international medals, gold in the FIVB World League, gold at the South American Championship and gold at the FIVB World Grand Champions Cup in Japan. He also won silver at the America's Cup. In 2006, Bernardinho won the FIVB World League, for the fifth time, and the FIVB World Championship for the second time. The success did not let up in 2007, with victories in the FIVB World League, the FIVB World Cup, the Pan American Games and the South American Championship. He also led a young team to second place at the America's Cup.

In 2008, Brazil failed in the most important tournaments of the season, finishing second in the Beijing Olympic Games and fourth in the FIVB World League, the Final Round of which was played in Rio de Janeiro. In 2009, however, the coach commanded a renewed team that won the FIVB World League, the FIVB World Grand Championship Cup and the South American Championship. In 2010, Brazil started the season winning the ninth title of the FIVB World League, overcoming the Italian record. In the end of the year, Bernardo his third FIVB World Championship title with Brazil.

In 2011, Rezende led the Brazilian national team to winning the silver medal in the FIVB World League and a gold medal in the South American Championship. By the end of the year, Brazil assured its spot at the London Olympic Games by finishing third in the FIVB World Cup. In 2012 Rezende Once again climbed to the Olympic Games final and won silver medal. From 2013 to 2015, Brazil won the silver medal in the 2013 FIVB World League and 2014 FIVB World League, gold medal in the 2013 FIVB World Grand Championship Cup, and gold medals in the 2013 South American Championship and 2015 South American Championship. Brazil began 2016 with a silver medal in 2016 FIVB World League. Rezende once again defeated his great rival Italy to win the gold medal in the Rio 2016 Olympics.

== Individual awards ==
- 2008 - Brazilian Superliga - Best Coach
- 2011 - Brazilian Superliga - Best Coach
- 2011 - ESPN - Best Coach in Volleyball
- 2012 - Volleyball Globe - Best Coach

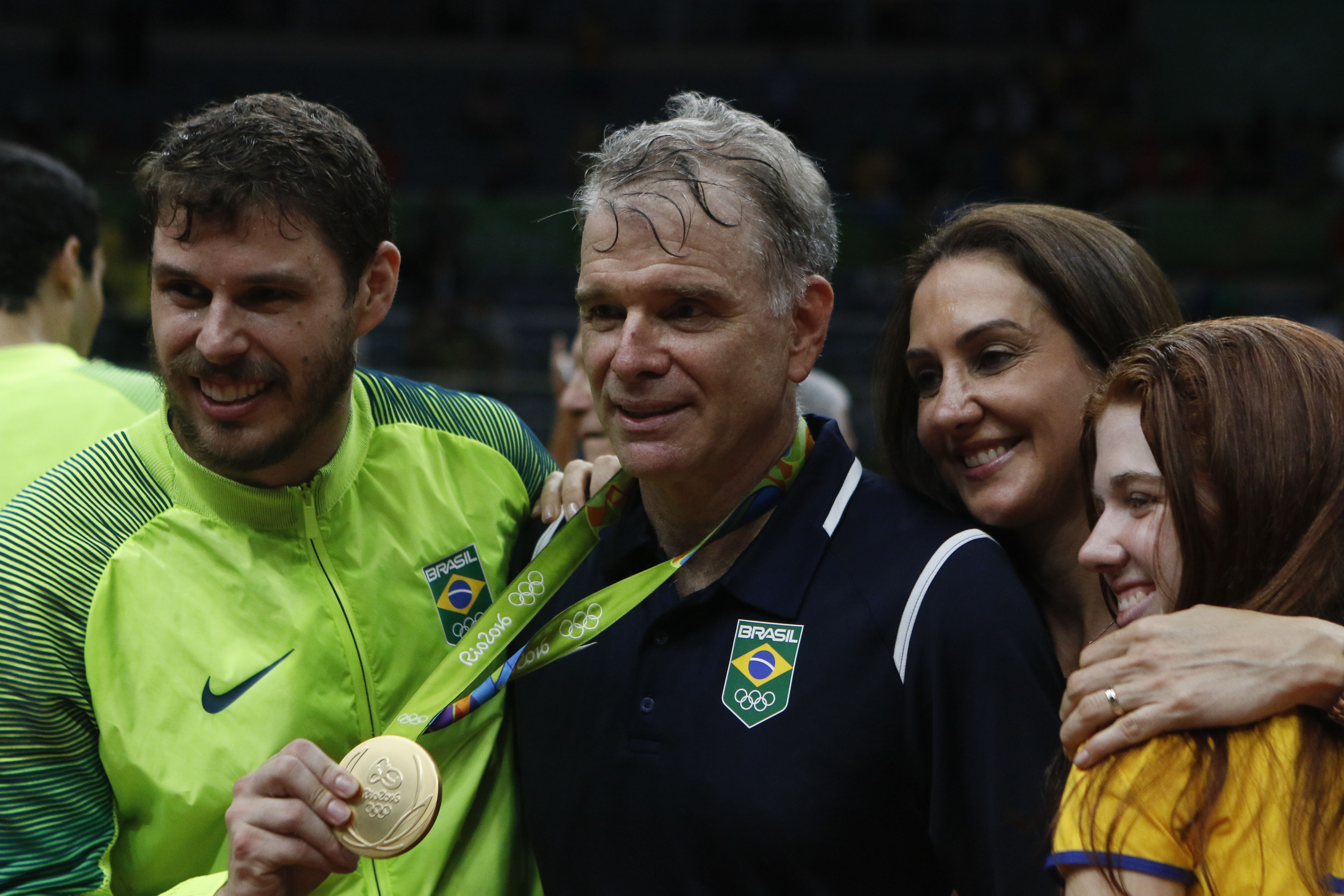
Rezende with his son Bruno and his wife Fernanda Venturini.

== Personal life ==
In 1999, Rezende married volleyball player Fernanda Venturini, with whom he has two daughters. They got divorced in 2020. From his previous marriage to player Vera Mossa he had a son who is currently the setter and captain of the Brazilian volleyball team, Bruno Rezende (Bruninho). Since August 2024, he is in a relationship with the journalist Ana Paula Araújo who currently hosts the morning show Bom Dia Brasil at the Rede Globo.

== Management ==
Rezende besides lecturer is also a businessman on several fronts separate business and is part of the board of directors of all of them:

- Delirio Tropical - Restaurant founded in 1983 with 9 units in Rio de Janeiro.
- Bodytech Group - The largest fitness centers in Latin America, with 50 units and more than 87,000 students.
- Instituto Compartilhar - NGO created by Rezende with the mission to develop young people from disadvantaged communities through by sport.
- eduK - Online educational institution.
