= Dante Amaral =

Brazilian volleyball player

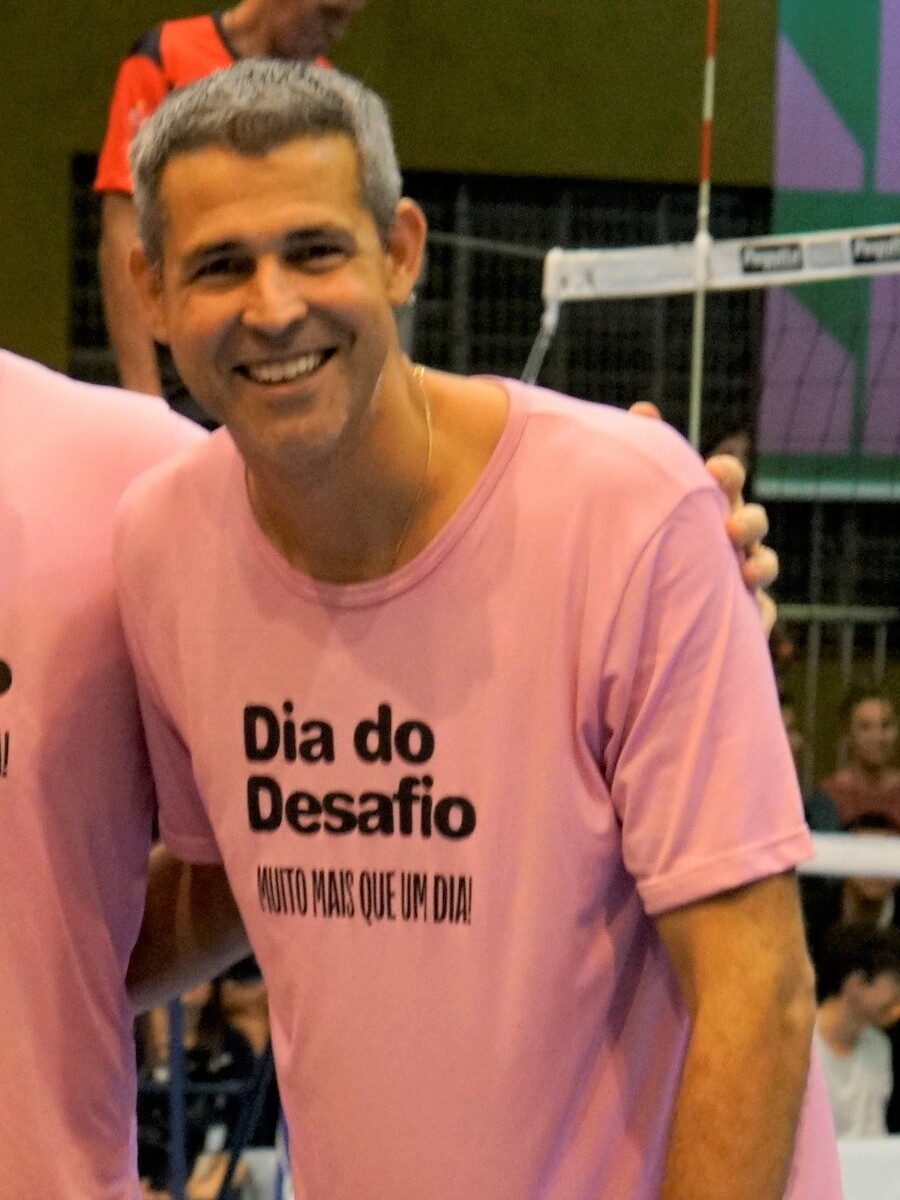

Personal information
- Full name: Dante Guimarães Santos do Amaral
- Born: 30 September 1980 (age 46); Itumbiara, GO, Brazil
- Height: 201 cm (6 ft 7 in)
- Weight: 86 kg (190 lb)
- Spike: 345 cm (136 in)
- Block: 327 cm (129 in)

Volleyball information
- Position: Outside spiker
- Current club: Retired

Career
Years	Teams
1999–2000	Três Corações
2000–2001	Suzano São Paulo
2001–2002	Minas Tênis Clube
2002–2005	Pallavolo Modena
2005–2008	Panathinaikos V.C.
2008–2011	VC Dynamo Moscow
2011–2012	RJX
2012–2014	Panasonic Panthers
2014–2015	Funvic Taubaté
2015–2016	EC São José
2016–2017	PAOK Thessaloniki
2017–2018	Funvic Taubaté

National team
1999–2013	Brazil
Honours
Men's volleyball
Representing Brazil
Event	1st	2nd	3rd
Olympic Games	1	2	0
World Championship	3	0	0
World Cup	2	0	1
World Grand Champions Cup	0	1	0
World League	7	3	0
Pan American Games	1	0	1
Total	14	6	2
Olympic Games
Gold medal – first place	2004 Athens	Team
Silver medal – second place	2008 Beijing	Team
Silver medal – second place	2012 London	Team
World Championship
Gold medal – first place	2002 Argentina	Team
Gold medal – first place	2006 Japan	Team
Gold medal – first place	2010 Italy	Team
World Cup
Gold medal – first place	2003 Japan	Team
Gold medal – first place	2007 Japan	Team
Bronze medal – third place	2011 Japan	Team
World Grand Champions Cup
Silver medal – second place	2001 Japan	Team
World League
Gold medal – first place	2001 Katowice	Team
Gold medal – first place	2003 Madrid	Team
Gold medal – first place	2004 Rome	Team
Gold medal – first place	2005 Belgrade	Team
Gold medal – first place	2006 Moscow	Team
Gold medal – first place	2007 Katowice	Team
Gold medal – first place	2010 Córdoba	Team
Silver medal – second place	2002 Belo Horizonte	Team
Silver medal – second place	2011 Gdańsk	Team
Silver medal – second place	2013 Mar del Plata	Team
Pan American Games
Gold medal – first place	2007 Rio de Janeiro	Team
Bronze medal – third place	2003 Santo Domingo	Team
South American Championship
Gold medal – first place	2011 Cuiabá	Team
Gold medal – first place	2013 Cabo Frio	Team

Dante Guimarães Santos do Amaral (born 30 September 1980) is a Brazilian former professional volleyball player, who is best known as Dante. Measuring 2.01 metres (6 ft 7 in) he played in the position of outside hitter. He was born in Itumbiara.

== Biography ==
=== Career ===
Dante began his professional career in 1999 with the club Tres Corações. After another two years at Brazilian clubs Suzano São Paulo and Minas Belo Horizonte, in 2002 he got transferred to Italy, playing with Pallavolo Modena, where he won the CEV Cup. In 2005 he joined Greek team Panathinaikos. He won the Greek championship in 2006 and the Greek cup and supercup in 2007.

Dante was also a member of the Brazil men's national volleyball team since 1999. Among the titles he has won with Brazil is the Olympic gold medal in 2004 and the World Championship in 2002 and 2006. In both the 2004 Olympic Games and 2006 World Championship he was nominated as the best spiker, while he was the best blocker in 2005 World League.

Amaral won the Best Spiker award in the 2011 South American Championship. His team won the gold medal and the 2011 World Cup berth.

== Sporting achievements ==
=== Clubs ===
- 2001/2002 Brazilian Superliga, with Minas Tênis Clube
- 2005/2006 Greek League, with Panathinaikos Athens
- 2012/2013 Brazilian Superliga, with Minas Tênis Clube
- 2016/2017 Greek League, with P.A.O.K. Thessaloniki

=== CEV Champions League ===
- 2002/2003 – with Modena Volley
- 2009/2010 – with Dynamo Moscow
- 2010/2011 – with Dynamo Moscow

=== CEV Challenge Cup ===
- 2003/2004 – with Modena Volley

=== National team ===
- 1999 South American Championship
- 2001 FIVB World League
- 2001 South American Championship
- 2001 FIVB World Grand Champions Cup
- 2002 FIVB World League
- 2002 FIVB World Championship
- 2003 FIVB World League
- 2003 South American Championship
- 2003 FIVB World Cup
- 2003 Pan American Games
- 2004 FIVB World League
- 2004 Olympic Games
- 2005 FIVB World League
- 2005 South American Championship
- 2006 FIVB World League
- 2006 FIVB World Championship
- 2007 FIVB World League
- 2007 FIVB World Cup
- 2007 Pan American Games
- 2008 Olympic Games
- 2010 FIVB World League
- 2010 FIVB World Championship
- 2011 FIVB World League
- 2011 FIVB World Cup
- 2012 Olympic Games
- 2013 FIVB World League

=== Individual ===
- 2004 FIVB World League – Best Receiver
- 2004 Summer Olympics – Best Spiker
- 2005 FIVB World League – Best Blocker
- 2005 America's Cup – Most Valuable Player
- 2005 America's Cup – Best Attacker
- 2006 FIVB World Championship – Best Spiker
- 2007 FIVB World Cup – Best Spiker
- 2008 FIVB World League – Best Spiker
- 2010 CEV Champions League – Best Spiker
- 2010 Memorial of Hubert Jerzy Wagner – Best Receiver
- 2011 South American Championship – Best Spiker
- 2014 Kurowashiki Tournament – Ideal Player

Awards
Preceded by (Brazil) André Nascimento	2006 FIVB World Championship's; Men's Best Spiker; 2006	Succeeded by (Russia) Maksim Mikhaylov
