= 2004 FIVB Volleyball World League squads =

This article show all participating team squads at the 2004 FIVB Volleyball World League, played by 12 countries from 4 May to 18 July 2004. The Final Round was held in Rome, Italy.

== Brazil ==
The following is the roster in the 2004 FIVB Volleyball World League.

No.	Name	Date of birth	Height	Weight	Spike	Block	2004 club
1	Roberto Minuzzi	27 August 1981	200 cm (6 ft 7 in)	88 kg (194 lb)	344 cm (135 in)	329 cm (130 in)	S.C.Ulbra, BRA
2	Marcelo Elgarten	9 November 1974	183 cm (6 ft 0 in)	78 kg (172 lb)	321 cm (126 in)	308 cm (121 in)	Unisul E. C., BRA
3	Giovane Gavio	7 September 1970	196 cm (6 ft 5 in)	89 kg (196 lb)	340 cm (130 in)	322 cm (127 in)	Minas Tenis Clube, BRA
4	André Heller	17 December 1975	199 cm (6 ft 6 in)	93 kg (205 lb)	339 cm (133 in)	321 cm (126 in)	Unisul E.C., BRA
5	Henrique Randow	5 April 1978	201 cm (6 ft 7 in)	88 kg (194 lb)	337 cm (133 in)	320 cm (130 in)	Minas Tenis Clube, BRA
6	Mauricio Lima	27 January 1968	184 cm (6 ft 0 in)	79 kg (174 lb)	321 cm (126 in)	304 cm (120 in)	Montichiari, ITA
7	Gilberto Godoy Filho	23 December 1976	192 cm (6 ft 4 in)	85 kg (187 lb)	325 cm (128 in)	312 cm (123 in)	Cuneo Piemonte Volley, ITA
8	Murilo Endres	3 May 1981	190 cm (6 ft 3 in)	76 kg (168 lb)	343 cm (135 in)	319 cm (126 in)	E.C. Suzano, BRA
9	André Nascimento	4 March 1979	195 cm (6 ft 5 in)	95 kg (209 lb)	340 cm (130 in)	320 cm (130 in)	Minas Tenis Clube, BRA
10	Sérgio Dutra Santos	15 October 1975	184 cm (6 ft 0 in)	78 kg (172 lb)	325 cm (128 in)	310 cm (120 in)	Banespa, BRA
11	Anderson Rodrigues	21 May 1974	190 cm (6 ft 3 in)	95 kg (209 lb)	330 cm (130 in)	321 cm (126 in)	NEC, JPN
12	Alan Domingos	15 February 1980	189 cm (6 ft 2 in)	75 kg (165 lb)	354 cm (139 in)	323 cm (127 in)	S.C.Ulbra, BRA
13	Gustavo Endres	23 August 1975	203 cm (6 ft 8 in)	98 kg (216 lb)	337 cm (133 in)	325 cm (128 in)	Icom Latina, ITA
14	Rodrigo Santana	17 April 1979	205 cm (6 ft 9 in)	85 kg (187 lb)	350 cm (140 in)	328 cm (129 in)	Estensi 4 Torri Ferrara, ITA
15	Renato Felizardo	4 July 1978	200 cm (6 ft 7 in)	89 kg (196 lb)	359 cm (141 in)	343 cm (135 in)	Ulbra, BRA
16	Joel Monteiro	24 April 1974	200 cm (6 ft 7 in)	95 kg (209 lb)	335 cm (132 in)	326 cm (128 in)	Societá Pallavolo Montichiari,
17	Ricardo Garcia	19 November 1975	191 cm (6 ft 3 in)	89 kg (196 lb)	337 cm (133 in)	320 cm (130 in)	Minas Tenis Clube, BRA
18	Dante Amaral	30 September 1980	201 cm (6 ft 7 in)	86 kg (190 lb)	345 cm (136 in)	327 cm (129 in)	Daytona Volley SRL, ITA

== Bulgaria ==
The following is the roster in the 2004 FIVB Volleyball World League.

No.	Name	Date of birth	Height	Weight	Spike	Block	2004 club
1	Evgeni Ivanov	3 June 1974	210 cm (6 ft 11 in)	98 kg (216 lb)	351 cm (138 in)	340 cm (130 in)	Tourcoing, France
2	Hristo Tsvetanov	29 March 1978	198 cm (6 ft 6 in)	85 kg (187 lb)	345 cm (136 in)	330 cm (130 in)	Levski Siconco
3	Andrey Zhekov	12 March 1980	190 cm (6 ft 3 in)	82 kg (181 lb)	340 cm (130 in)	326 cm (128 in)	Levski Siconco
4	Ivan Kolchagov	17 June 1981	205 cm (6 ft 9 in)	98 kg (216 lb)	355 cm (140 in)	335 cm (132 in)	Taragona, Spain
5	Svetozar Ivanov	28 October 1977	208 cm (6 ft 10 in)	100 kg (220 lb)	347 cm (137 in)	336 cm (132 in)	Slavia
6	Matey Kaziyski	23 September 1984	202 cm (6 ft 8 in)	93 kg (205 lb)	360 cm (140 in)	335 cm (132 in)	Lukoil Neftohimik, Burgas, BUL
7	Tsanko Tsankov	29 June 1979	216 cm (7 ft 1 in)	110 kg (240 lb)	355 cm (140 in)	348 cm (137 in)	Slavia, Sofia, BUL
8	Danail Mihaylov	1 July 1974	197 cm (6 ft 6 in)	87 kg (192 lb)	338 cm (133 in)	325 cm (128 in)	Levski Siconco
9	Nikolay Naydenov	22 April 1974	200 cm (6 ft 7 in)	90 kg (200 lb)	338 cm (133 in)	320 cm (130 in)	Levski Siconco, Sofia, BUL
10	Smilen Mlyakov	17 June 1981	200 cm (6 ft 7 in)	98 kg (216 lb)	347 cm (137 in)	335 cm (132 in)	CSKA Royal Cake
11	Vladimir Nikolov	3 October 1977	200 cm (6 ft 7 in)	95 kg (209 lb)	345 cm (136 in)	325 cm (128 in)	Tours Volley-ball, France
12	Nikolay Ivanov	14 June 1972	192 cm (6 ft 4 in)	93 kg (205 lb)	329 cm (130 in)	323 cm (127 in)	Neftianik, Russia
13	Teodor Salparov	16 August 1982	185 cm (6 ft 1 in)	73 kg (161 lb)	320 cm (130 in)	305 cm (120 in)	CSKA Royal Cake
14	Tsvetan Hristov	24 June 1980	201 cm (6 ft 7 in)	95 kg (209 lb)	345 cm (136 in)	330 cm (130 in)	CSKA Royal Cake
15	Kostadin Stoykov	7 December 1977	199 cm (6 ft 6 in)	85 kg (187 lb)	349 cm (137 in)	329 cm (130 in)	Levski Siconco, Sofia, BUL
16	Danail Milushev	3 February 1984	200 cm (6 ft 7 in)	93 kg (205 lb)	358 cm (141 in)	335 cm (132 in)	Lukoil Neftohimik, Burgas, BUL
17	Plamen Konstantinov	14 June 1973	202 cm (6 ft 8 in)	93 kg (205 lb)	347 cm (137 in)	330 cm (130 in)	Panathinaikos, Greece
18	Krasimir Stefanov	27 December 1977	202 cm (6 ft 8 in)	91 kg (201 lb)	350 cm (140 in)	325 cm (128 in)	Levski Siconco

== China ==
The following is the roster in the 2004 FIVB Volleyball World League.

No.	Name	Date of birth	Height	Weight	Spike	Block	2004 club
1	Xiaodong Zhang	22 November 1979	203 cm (6 ft 8 in)	75 kg (165 lb)	350 cm (140 in)	341 cm (134 in)	Jaingsu, China
2	Song Hu	21 February 1983	198 cm (6 ft 6 in)	75 kg (165 lb)	350 cm (140 in)	340 cm (130 in)	Beijing, China
3	Liang Zheng	3 May 1970	201 cm (6 ft 7 in)	83 kg (183 lb)	363 cm (143 in)	353 cm (139 in)	Zhejiang, Hangzhou, China
4	Zhi Yuan	29 September 1981	195 cm (6 ft 5 in)	88 kg (194 lb)	348 cm (137 in)	334 cm (131 in)	Liaoning, Shenyang, China
5	Hebing Wang	10 February 1970	191 cm (6 ft 3 in)	81 kg (179 lb)	348 cm (137 in)	324 cm (128 in)	Zhejiang, Hangzhou, China
6	Xiaodong Cui	17 November 1980	205 cm (6 ft 9 in)	80 kg (180 lb)	355 cm (140 in)	345 cm (136 in)	Shanghai Cable TV Club
7	Miao Tang	4 May 1982	204 cm (6 ft 8 in)	85 kg (187 lb)	355 cm (140 in)	345 cm (136 in)	Shanghai, Shanghai, China
8	Hairong Shi	27 March 1977	192 cm (6 ft 4 in)	75 kg (165 lb)	350 cm (140 in)	336 cm (132 in)	Jiangsu, Nanjing, China
9	Jiong He	16 February 1977	188 cm (6 ft 2 in)	76 kg (168 lb)	342 cm (135 in)	332 cm (131 in)	Shanghai, Shanghai, China
10	Hang Li	3 February 1979	203 cm (6 ft 8 in)	89 kg (196 lb)	360 cm (140 in)	343 cm (135 in)	Zhejiang, China
11	Chun Li	1 April 1982	190 cm (6 ft 3 in)	82 kg (181 lb)	348 cm (137 in)	332 cm (131 in)	Army, Beijing, China
12	Qiong Shen	5 September 1981	198 cm (6 ft 6 in)	84 kg (185 lb)	359 cm (141 in)	349 cm (137 in)	Shanghai, Shanghai, China
13	Ming Mi	1 October 1977	193 cm (6 ft 4 in)	93 kg (205 lb)	345 cm (136 in)	335 cm (132 in)	Zhejiang, Hangshou
14	Shengsheng Sui	30 May 1980	192 cm (6 ft 4 in)	75 kg (165 lb)	345 cm (136 in)	334 cm (131 in)	Liaoning, Shenyang, China
15	Hui Chu	11 February 1981	187 cm (6 ft 2 in)	70 kg (150 lb)	355 cm (140 in)	323 cm (127 in)	Liaoning, China
16	Enliang Li	15 March 1981	185 cm (6 ft 1 in)	72 kg (159 lb)	338 cm (133 in)	328 cm (129 in)	Shandong, Jinan, China
17	Xiang Zhang	30 May 1971	192 cm (6 ft 4 in)	82 kg (181 lb)	350 cm (140 in)	340 cm (130 in)	Sichuan, Chengdu
18	Jiajie An	17 July 1972	202 cm (6 ft 8 in)	85 kg (187 lb)	350 cm (140 in)	340 cm (130 in)	Shandong, Jinan, China

== Cuba ==
The following is the roster in the 2004 FIVB Volleyball World League.

No.	Name	Date of birth	Height	Weight	Spike	Block	2004 club
1	Raidel Poey Romero	20 February 1982	198 cm (6 ft 6 in)	82 kg (181 lb)	360 cm (140 in)	340 cm (130 in)	Ciudad Habana, CUB
2	Miguel A. Dalmaut C.	21 September 1984	197 cm (6 ft 6 in)	83 kg (183 lb)	353 cm (139 in)	330 cm (130 in)	Villa Clara
3	Charles Vinent	21 February 1983	192 cm (6 ft 4 in)	75 kg (165 lb)	352 cm (139 in)	322 cm (127 in)	V. Clara
4	Yasser Portuando	2 February 1983	196 cm (6 ft 5 in)	90 kg (200 lb)	351 cm (138 in)	319 cm (126 in)	Santigao de Cuba, CUB
5	Osmany Juantorena Portuondo	12 August 1985	190 cm (6 ft 3 in)	77 kg (170 lb)	350 cm (140 in)	330 cm (130 in)	Santiago de Cuba, CUB
6	Javier Gonzalez P.	21 January 1983	193 cm (6 ft 4 in)	80 kg (180 lb)	358 cm (141 in)	330 cm (130 in)	Ciudad Habana, CUB
7	Ariel Gil	3 August 1983	200 cm (6 ft 7 in)	90 kg (200 lb)	362 cm (143 in)	328 cm (129 in)	Matanzas, CUB
8	Pavel Pimienta Allen	3 August 1976	204 cm (6 ft 8 in)	96 kg (212 lb)	365 cm (144 in)	340 cm (130 in)	Camaguey, CUB
9	Maikel Salas	22 April 1981	192 cm (6 ft 4 in)	78 kg (172 lb)	351 cm (138 in)	345 cm (136 in)	Santiago de Cuba, CUB
10	Dariel Garcia C.	13 June 1981	199 cm (6 ft 6 in)	91 kg (201 lb)	362 cm (143 in)	334 cm (131 in)	Ciudad Habana, CUB
11	Jesus Cruz R.	15 February 1982	203 cm (6 ft 8 in)	100 kg (220 lb)	350 cm (140 in)	325 cm (128 in)	Ciudad Habana, CUB
12	Yenry Bell	27 July 1983	188 cm (6 ft 2 in)	84 kg (185 lb)	358 cm (141 in)	328 cm (129 in)	Santiago de Cuba, CUB
13	Joan Llanez Diaz	21 October 1983	200 cm (6 ft 7 in)	83 kg (183 lb)	355 cm (140 in)	325 cm (128 in)	S. de Cuba
14	Raydel Corrales Pouto	15 February 1982	201 cm (6 ft 7 in)	94 kg (207 lb)	355 cm (140 in)	325 cm (128 in)	Santiago de Cuba, Cuba
15	Nicolas Ernestos Vives Coffibny	24 April 1970	189 cm (6 ft 2 in)	86 kg (190 lb)	345 cm (136 in)	335 cm (132 in)	Cienfuegos
16	Sirianis Mendez	14 March 1983	193 cm (6 ft 4 in)	81 kg (179 lb)	350 cm (140 in)	320 cm (130 in)	Matanzas
17	Odelvis Dominico Speek	6 May 1977	205 cm (6 ft 9 in)	87 kg (192 lb)	360 cm (140 in)	356 cm (140 in)	Ciudad Habana, CUB
18	Javier Brito Pons	5 September 1975	185 cm (6 ft 1 in)	70 kg (150 lb)	340 cm (130 in)	314 cm (124 in)	Ciudad Habana, CUB

== France ==
The following is the roster in the 2004 FIVB Volleyball World League.

No.	Name	Date of birth	Height	Weight	Spike	Block	2004 club
1	Johan Cohen	23 September 1975	190 cm (6 ft 3 in)	90 kg (200 lb)	330 cm (130 in)	319 cm (126 in)	Poitiers, FRA
2	Hubert Henno	6 October 1976	188 cm (6 ft 2 in)	83 kg (183 lb)	330 cm (130 in)	310 cm (120 in)	Tours, FRA
3	Dominique Daquin	10 November 1972	197 cm (6 ft 6 in)	85 kg (187 lb)	352 cm (139 in)	325 cm (128 in)	Moscou, RUS
4	Ludovic Castard	18 January 1983	194 cm (6 ft 4 in)	80 kg (180 lb)	344 cm (135 in)	321 cm (126 in)	Sète, FRA
5	Frederic Gibert	15 April 1973	201 cm (6 ft 7 in)	95 kg (209 lb)	348 cm (137 in)	327 cm (129 in)	Tours, FRA
6	Jean Charles Monneraye	25 August 1980	209 cm (6 ft 10 in)	103 kg (227 lb)	356 cm (140 in)	332 cm (131 in)	Tourcoing, FRA
7	Stéphane Antiga	3 February 1976	200 cm (6 ft 7 in)	94 kg (207 lb)	344 cm (135 in)	321 cm (126 in)	Cuneo, ITA
8	Laurent Capet	5 May 1972	202 cm (6 ft 8 in)	92 kg (203 lb)	350 cm (140 in)	325 cm (128 in)	Tourcoing, FRA
9	Frantz Granvorka	10 March 1976	195 cm (6 ft 5 in)	90 kg (200 lb)	364 cm (143 in)	327 cm (129 in)	Salonique, GRE
10	Vincent Montmeat	1 September 1977	196 cm (6 ft 5 in)	88 kg (194 lb)	348 cm (137 in)	330 cm (130 in)	Poitiers, FRA
11	Loïc De Kergret	20 August 1970	193 cm (6 ft 4 in)	89 kg (196 lb)	335 cm (132 in)	315 cm (124 in)	Tours, FRA
12	Pierre Pujol	13 July 1984	182 cm (6 ft 0 in)	67 kg (148 lb)	325 cm (128 in)	300 cm (120 in)	Poitiers, FRA
13	Marc Schalk	3 December 1973	197 cm (6 ft 6 in)	85 kg (187 lb)	350 cm (140 in)	325 cm (128 in)	Cannes, FRA
14	Philippe Barca-Cysique	22 April 1977	194 cm (6 ft 4 in)	88 kg (194 lb)	347 cm (137 in)	325 cm (128 in)	Nice, FRA
15	Guillaume Samica	28 September 1981	196 cm (6 ft 5 in)	82 kg (181 lb)	343 cm (135 in)	318 cm (125 in)	Trieste, ITA
16	Mathias Patin	25 April 1974	185 cm (6 ft 1 in)	73 kg (161 lb)	325 cm (128 in)	315 cm (124 in)	Paris, FRA
17	Oliver Kieffer	27 August 1979	200 cm (6 ft 7 in)	85 kg (187 lb)	355 cm (140 in)	335 cm (132 in)	Paris, FRA
18	Sebastien Frangolacci	31 March 1976	192 cm (6 ft 4 in)	88 kg (194 lb)	340 cm (130 in)	322 cm (127 in)	Paris, FRA

== Greece ==
The following is the roster in the 2004 FIVB Volleyball World League.

No.	Name	Date of birth	Height	Weight	Spike	Block	2004 club
1	Konstantinos Christofidelis	26 June 1977	195 cm (6 ft 5 in)	87 kg (192 lb)	341 cm (134 in)	320 cm (130 in)	Olympiakos, Piraeus, Greece
2	Marios Giourdas	2 March 1973	202 cm (6 ft 8 in)	90 kg (200 lb)	356 cm (140 in)	341 cm (134 in)	Parma, Italy
3	Theodoros Chatziantoniou	16 March 1974	204 cm (6 ft 8 in)	95 kg (209 lb)	360 cm (140 in)	350 cm (140 in)	Panathinaikos, Athens, Greece
4	Chrysanthos Kyriazis	21 April 1972	195 cm (6 ft 5 in)	84 kg (185 lb)	338 cm (133 in)	322 cm (127 in)	OLYMPIAKOS, Piraeus, Greece
5	Theodoros Bozidis	8 April 1973	195 cm (6 ft 5 in)	93 kg (205 lb)	330 cm (130 in)	325 cm (128 in)	GS IRAKLIS, Thessaloniki, Gree
6	Vasileios Kournetas	2 August 1976	191 cm (6 ft 3 in)	82 kg (181 lb)	336 cm (132 in)	320 cm (130 in)	Olympiakos, Piraeus, Greece
7	Georgios Stefanou	12 January 1981	187 cm (6 ft 2 in)	82 kg (181 lb)	295 cm (116 in)	305 cm (120 in)	Panathinaikos, Athens, Greece
8	Efstathios Ntonas	2 February 1981	200 cm (6 ft 7 in)	96 kg (212 lb)	330 cm (130 in)	330 cm (130 in)	Panathinaikos, Athens, Greece
9	Christos Dimitrakopoulos	1 July 1974	188 cm (6 ft 2 in)	86 kg (190 lb)	325 cm (128 in)	325 cm (128 in)	OLYMPIAKOS, Piraeus, Greece
10	Antonios Tsakiropoulos	1 July 1969	205 cm (6 ft 9 in)	93 kg (205 lb)	350 cm (140 in)	336 cm (132 in)	Olympiakos, Piraeus, Greece
11	Nikolaos Roumeliotis	12 October 1978	201 cm (6 ft 7 in)	97 kg (214 lb)	343 cm (135 in)	320 cm (130 in)	E.A. PATRON, Patra, Greece
12	Nikolaos Smaragdis	12 February 1982	202 cm (6 ft 8 in)	85 kg (187 lb)	328 cm (129 in)	318 cm (125 in)	Panathinaikos, Athens, Greece
13	Georgios Papazoglou	27 June 1973	199 cm (6 ft 6 in)	96 kg (212 lb)	340 cm (130 in)	320 cm (130 in)	A.O. ORESTIADA, Orestiada, GRE
14	Sotirios Pantaleon	21 June 1980	200 cm (6 ft 7 in)	77 kg (170 lb)	330 cm (130 in)	312 cm (123 in)	Panathinaikos, Athens, Greece
15	Ilias Lappas	20 July 1979	194 cm (6 ft 4 in)	92 kg (203 lb)	335 cm (132 in)	320 cm (130 in)	P.A.O.K., Thessaloniki, Greece
16	Andrej Kravarik	28 July 1971	204 cm (6 ft 8 in)	97 kg (214 lb)	360 cm (140 in)	350 cm (140 in)	G.S. IRAKLIS, Thessaloniki, Gr
17	Konstantinos Prousalis	6 October 1980	192 cm (6 ft 4 in)	83 kg (183 lb)	320 cm (130 in)	295 cm (116 in)	P.A.O.K., Thessalomiki, Greece
18	Tontor - Zlatko Baev	31 May 1977	200 cm (6 ft 7 in)	95 kg (209 lb)	340 cm (130 in)	333 cm (131 in)	GS IRAKLIS, Thessaloniki, Greece

== Italy ==
The following is the roster in the 2004 FIVB Volleyball World League.

No.	Name	Date of birth	Height	Weight	Spike	Block	2004 club
1	Luigi Mastrangelo	17 August 1975	202 cm (6 ft 8 in)	90 kg (200 lb)	368 cm (145 in)	336 cm (132 in)	Lube Banca Marche Macerata, Cu
2	Marco Meoni	25 May 1973	197 cm (6 ft 6 in)	86 kg (190 lb)	338 cm (133 in)	313 cm (123 in)	Unimade, Parma
3	Pietro Rinaldi	26 March 1972	197 cm (6 ft 6 in)	85 kg (187 lb)	340 cm (130 in)	312 cm (123 in)	Icom, Latina
4	Manuel Coscione	29 January 1980	188 cm (6 ft 2 in)	84 kg (185 lb)	342 cm (135 in)	320 cm (130 in)	Edilbasso, Padova
5	Valerio Vermiglio	1 March 1976	190 cm (6 ft 3 in)	83 kg (183 lb)	342 cm (135 in)	320 cm (130 in)	Sisley, Treviso
6	Samuele Papi	20 May 1973	190 cm (6 ft 3 in)	84 kg (185 lb)	345 cm (136 in)	308 cm (121 in)	Sisley, Treviso
7	Andrea Sartoretti	19 June 1971	194 cm (6 ft 4 in)	88 kg (194 lb)	353 cm (139 in)	319 cm (126 in)	Itas Diatec, Trento
8	Alberto Cisolla	10 October 1977	197 cm (6 ft 6 in)	86 kg (190 lb)	367 cm (144 in)	345 cm (136 in)	Sisley, Treviso
9	Cristian Savani	22 February 1982	194 cm (6 ft 4 in)	83 kg (183 lb)	354 cm (139 in)	335 cm (132 in)	Bossini Montichiari, Montichia
10	Luca Tencati	16 March 1979	200 cm (6 ft 7 in)	97 kg (214 lb)	350 cm (140 in)	330 cm (130 in)	Sisley Treviso, Treviso
11	Hristo Zlatanov	21 April 1976	204 cm (6 ft 8 in)	103 kg (227 lb)	355 cm (140 in)	315 cm (124 in)	Coprasystel, Piacenza
12	Damiano Pippi	23 August 1971	193 cm (6 ft 4 in)	84 kg (185 lb)	323 cm (127 in)	305 cm (120 in)	Kerakoll Modena, Modena
13	Andrea Giani	22 April 1970	196 cm (6 ft 5 in)	97 kg (214 lb)	356 cm (140 in)	322 cm (127 in)	Kerakoll Modena, Modena
14	Alessandro Fei	29 November 1978	204 cm (6 ft 8 in)	90 kg (200 lb)	352 cm (139 in)	321 cm (126 in)	Sisley, Treviso
15	Paolo Tofoli	14 August 1966	188 cm (6 ft 2 in)	81 kg (179 lb)	345 cm (136 in)	321 cm (126 in)	Itas Diatec Trentino, Trento
16	Francesco Biribanti	17 January 1976	201 cm (6 ft 7 in)	94 kg (207 lb)	360 cm (140 in)	340 cm (130 in)	Icom, Latina
17	Paolo Cozzi	26 May 1980	200 cm (6 ft 7 in)	86 kg (190 lb)	363 cm (143 in)	328 cm (129 in)	Kerakoll, Modena
18	Matej Cernic	13 September 1978	192 cm (6 ft 4 in)	80 kg (180 lb)	354 cm (139 in)	335 cm (132 in)	Kerakoll Modena, Modena

== Japan ==
The following is the roster in the 2004 FIVB Volleyball World League.

No.	Name	Date of birth	Height	Weight	Spike	Block	2004 club
1	Hiroaki Kawaura	13 November 1975	200 cm (6 ft 7 in)	82 kg (181 lb)	357 cm (141 in)	340 cm (130 in)	Toyoda Gosei Trefuerza, Aichi,
2	Daisuke Usami	29 March 1979	184 cm (6 ft 0 in)	82 kg (181 lb)	345 cm (136 in)	325 cm (128 in)	NEC Blue Rockets, Tokyo, JPN
3	Ayumu Shinoda	14 December 1979	193 cm (6 ft 4 in)	83 kg (183 lb)	343 cm (135 in)	323 cm (127 in)	Toray Arrows, Shizuoka, JPN
4	Ryu Morishige	18 July 1980	191 cm (6 ft 3 in)	83 kg (183 lb)	346 cm (136 in)	330 cm (130 in)	Toyoda-Gosei Trefuerza, Aichi,
5	Yusuke Matsuta	31 October 1982	201 cm (6 ft 7 in)	89 kg (196 lb)	355 cm (140 in)	345 cm (136 in)	Tokai University, Kanagawa, JP
6	Keisuke Imai	5 February 1980	196 cm (6 ft 5 in)	85 kg (187 lb)	353 cm (139 in)	340 cm (130 in)	Panasonic Panthers, Osaka, JPN
7	Satoru Maeda	9 August 1977	185 cm (6 ft 1 in)	80 kg (180 lb)	330 cm (130 in)	317 cm (125 in)	JT Thunders, Hiroshima, JPN
8	Katsutoshi Tsumagari	2 November 1975	183 cm (6 ft 0 in)	75 kg (165 lb)	322 cm (127 in)	310 cm (120 in)	Suntory Sunbirds, Osaka, JPN
9	Ko Tanimura	15 August 1982	194 cm (6 ft 4 in)	77 kg (170 lb)	340 cm (130 in)	333 cm (131 in)	Chuo University, Tokyo, JPN
10	Naoki Morokuma	19 June 1978	190 cm (6 ft 3 in)	83 kg (183 lb)	340 cm (130 in)	330 cm (130 in)	Toyoda-Gosei Trefuerza, Aichi,
11	Kyohei Shibata	24 June 1981	189 cm (6 ft 2 in)	74 kg (163 lb)	343 cm (135 in)	323 cm (127 in)	Toray Arrows, Shizuoka, JPN
12	Daisuke Sakai	22 October 1981	180 cm (5 ft 11 in)	75 kg (165 lb)	320 cm (130 in)	310 cm (120 in)	JT Thunders, Hiroshima, JPN
13	Hiroyuki Kai	17 July 1978	189 cm (6 ft 2 in)	87 kg (192 lb)	340 cm (130 in)	325 cm (128 in)	Sakai Blazers, Osaka, JPN
14	Takahiro Yamamoto	12 July 1978	200 cm (6 ft 7 in)	87 kg (192 lb)	345 cm (136 in)	330 cm (130 in)	Panasonic Panthers, Osaka, JPN
15	Nobuharu Saito	29 September 1973	205 cm (6 ft 9 in)	95 kg (209 lb)	355 cm (140 in)	340 cm (130 in)	Toray Arrows, Shizuoka, JPN
16	Yu Koshikawa	30 June 1984	189 cm (6 ft 2 in)	87 kg (192 lb)	345 cm (136 in)	325 cm (128 in)	Suntory Sunbirds, Osaka, JPN
17	Yuta Abe	8 August 1981	192 cm (6 ft 4 in)	78 kg (172 lb)	335 cm (132 in)	322 cm (127 in)	Tokai University, Kanagawa, JP
18	Akira Koshiya	12 June 1979	190 cm (6 ft 3 in)	73 kg (161 lb)	335 cm (132 in)	320 cm (130 in)	Toray Arrows, Shizuoka, JPN

== Poland ==
The following is the roster in the 2004 FIVB Volleyball World League.

No.	Name	Date of birth	Height	Weight	Spike	Block	2004 club
1	Andrzej Stelmach	15 August 1972	200 cm (6 ft 7 in)	98 kg (216 lb)	330 cm (130 in)	320 cm (130 in)	Skra, Belchatow POL
2	Michal Winiarski	28 September 1983	198 cm (6 ft 6 in)	80 kg (180 lb)	340 cm (130 in)	321 cm (126 in)	Pamapol AZS, Czestochowa, POL
3	Piotr Gruszka	8 March 1977	206 cm (6 ft 9 in)	98 kg (216 lb)	350 cm (140 in)	325 cm (128 in)	Tourcoing, Lille Metropole, FR
4	Damian Dacewicz	28 September 1974	209 cm (6 ft 10 in)	100 kg (220 lb)	356 cm (140 in)	335 cm (132 in)	KP Polska Energia, Sosnowiec,
5	Pawel Zagumny	18 October 1977	200 cm (6 ft 7 in)	92 kg (203 lb)	336 cm (132 in)	317 cm (125 in)	PZU AZS, Olsztyn, POL
6	Dawid Murek	24 July 1977	196 cm (6 ft 5 in)	92 kg (203 lb)	341 cm (134 in)	325 cm (128 in)	Panathinaikos, Athen, GRE
7	Wojciech Grzyb	4 January 1981	205 cm (6 ft 9 in)	104 kg (229 lb)	355 cm (140 in)	332 cm (131 in)	PZU AZS Olsztyn, POL
8	Krzysztof Ignaczak	15 May 1978	188 cm (6 ft 2 in)	86 kg (190 lb)	330 cm (130 in)	315 cm (124 in)	Skra, Belchatow, POL
9	Jakub Oczko	27 December 1981	192 cm (6 ft 4 in)	83 kg (183 lb)	330 cm (130 in)	314 cm (124 in)	Pamapol AZS, Czestochowa, POL
10	Mariusz Wlazly	4 August 1983	195 cm (6 ft 5 in)	75 kg (165 lb)	355 cm (140 in)	330 cm (130 in)	SKRA, Belchatow, POL
11	Lukasz Kadziewicz	20 September 1980	206 cm (6 ft 9 in)	84 kg (185 lb)	348 cm (137 in)	323 cm (127 in)	PZU AZS, Olsztyn, POL
12	Piotr Gabrych	5 July 1972	197 cm (6 ft 6 in)	95 kg (209 lb)	342 cm (135 in)	318 cm (125 in)	Ivett, Jastrzebie, POL
13	Sebastian Swiderski	26 June 1977	193 cm (6 ft 4 in)	88 kg (194 lb)	354 cm (139 in)	325 cm (128 in)	RPA Volley, Perugia, ITA
14	Pawel Papke	13 February 1977	196 cm (6 ft 5 in)	100 kg (220 lb)	347 cm (137 in)	325 cm (128 in)	PZU AZS, Olsztyn
15	Michal Ruciak	22 August 1983	189 cm (6 ft 2 in)	75 kg (165 lb)	336 cm (132 in)	305 cm (120 in)	Skra, Belchatow, POL
16	Arkadiusz Golas	10 May 1981	201 cm (6 ft 7 in)	82 kg (181 lb)	365 cm (144 in)	342 cm (135 in)	Pamapol AZS, Czestochowa, POL
17	Michal Bakiewicz	22 March 1981	196 cm (6 ft 5 in)	79 kg (174 lb)	338 cm (133 in)	324 cm (128 in)	Skra, Belchatow, POL
18	Robert Szczerbaniuk	29 May 1977	199 cm (6 ft 6 in)	94 kg (207 lb)	350 cm (140 in)	327 cm (129 in)	Mostostal, Kedz-Kozle, POL

== Portugal ==
The following is the roster in the 2004 FIVB Volleyball World League.

No.	Name	Date of birth	Height	Weight	Spike	Block	2004 club
1	Roberto Mauro Silva Reis	2 March 1980	190 cm (6 ft 3 in)	85 kg (187 lb)	335 cm (132 in)	311 cm (122 in)	Esmoriz G.C., Esmoriz, POR
2	Carlos Miguel Jesus Teixeira	11 March 1976	185 cm (6 ft 1 in)	76 kg (168 lb)	311 cm (122 in)	293 cm (115 in)	AAA, Ponta Delgada, POR
3	Nuno Miguel Araujo Pinheiro	31 December 1984	192 cm (6 ft 4 in)	89 kg (196 lb)	327 cm (129 in)	315 cm (124 in)	Vitoria S.C., Guimaraes, POR
4	Joao Carlos Beja Calado Malveiro	8 December 1979	198 cm (6 ft 6 in)	90 kg (200 lb)	343 cm (135 in)	321 cm (126 in)	A.A. Coimbra, Coimbra, POR
5	Fabio Machado Cadeco Milhazes	15 March 1982	198 cm (6 ft 6 in)	80 kg (180 lb)	337 cm (133 in)	320 cm (130 in)	G.C. Vilacondense, V.Conde, PO
6	Manuel Fernando Paiva Silva	28 December 1973	190 cm (6 ft 3 in)	93 kg (205 lb)	345 cm (136 in)	325 cm (128 in)	Numancia Caja Dureo, Soria, ES
7	Marco Aurelio Lopes Soares	13 August 1971	186 cm (6 ft 1 in)	87 kg (192 lb)	305 cm (120 in)	295 cm (116 in)	C.S. Maritimo, Funchal, Portug
8	Hugo Fernando Lucas Gaspar	2 September 1982	200 cm (6 ft 7 in)	79 kg (174 lb)	354 cm (139 in)	322 cm (127 in)	Esmoriz G.C., Esmoriz, POR
9	Jose Roberto Sousa Vieira	6 June 1983	202 cm (6 ft 8 in)	89 kg (196 lb)	332 cm (131 in)	310 cm (120 in)	C.S. Maritimo, Funchal, Portug
10	Luis Maria Jardim Palma Pessoa	16 June 1981	200 cm (6 ft 7 in)	78 kg (172 lb)	336 cm (132 in)	325 cm (128 in)	Assoc. Acad. Coimbra, Coimbra,
11	Eden Luri Sousa Sequeira	28 October 1980	197 cm (6 ft 6 in)	90 kg (200 lb)	342 cm (135 in)	330 cm (130 in)	Assoc. Acad. Coimbra, Coimbra,
12	Joao Miguel Sequeira Jose	7 June 1978	194 cm (6 ft 4 in)	87 kg (192 lb)	340 cm (130 in)	335 cm (132 in)	Castelo Maia G.C., Castelo Mai
13	Andre Reis Lopes	12 September 1982	192 cm (6 ft 4 in)	84 kg (185 lb)	345 cm (136 in)	330 cm (130 in)	A.A. Coimbra, Coimbra, POR
14	Flavio Rodolfo Gonçalves Cruz	28 August 1982	195 cm (6 ft 5 in)	85 kg (187 lb)	340 cm (130 in)	330 cm (130 in)	C.S. Maritimo, Funchal, POR
15	Jorge Miguel Silva Ribeiro Oliveira Al	7 February 1978	187 cm (6 ft 2 in)	85 kg (187 lb)	343 cm (135 in)	325 cm (128 in)	Castelo Maia G.C., Maia, POR
16	Valdir Sousa Sequeira	22 November 1981	194 cm (6 ft 4 in)	82 kg (181 lb)	351 cm (138 in)	335 cm (132 in)	A.A. Coimbra, Coimbra, POR
17	Hugo Miguel Sousa Ribeiro	15 November 1977	180 cm (5 ft 11 in)	80 kg (180 lb)	315 cm (124 in)	300 cm (120 in)	Castelo Maia G.C., Castelo Mai
18	Eurico Manuel Correia Peixoto	13 May 1981	192 cm (6 ft 4 in)	85 kg (187 lb)	340 cm (130 in)	314 cm (124 in)	Esmoriz G.C., Esmoriz, POR

== Serbia and Montenegro ==
The following is the roster in the 2004 FIVB Volleyball World League.

No.	Name	Date of birth	Height	Weight	Spike	Block	2004 club
1	Vlado Petkovic	6 January 1983	198 cm (6 ft 6 in)	97 kg (214 lb)	325 cm (128 in)	315 cm (124 in)	Crvena Zvezda Beograd, SCG
2	Milan Vasic	2 September 1980	204 cm (6 ft 8 in)	98 kg (216 lb)	355 cm (140 in)	330 cm (130 in)	Pallavolo LORETO S.r.l., ITA
3	Goran Maric	2 November 1981	204 cm (6 ft 8 in)	87 kg (192 lb)	344 cm (135 in)	327 cm (129 in)	Vojvodina Novi Sad, SCG
4	Bojan Janic	11 March 1982	198 cm (6 ft 6 in)	83 kg (183 lb)	345 cm (136 in)	322 cm (127 in)	Estense 4Torri - Ferara, ITA
5	Aleksandar Mitrovic	24 September 1982	193 cm (6 ft 4 in)	93 kg (205 lb)	350 cm (140 in)	324 cm (128 in)	Partizan Beograd, SCG
6	Branko Roljic	28 September 1981	199 cm (6 ft 6 in)	95 kg (209 lb)	340 cm (130 in)	320 cm (130 in)	Vojvodina Novi Sad, SCG
7	Dula Mester	3 April 1972	203 cm (6 ft 8 in)	90 kg (200 lb)	346 cm (136 in)	325 cm (128 in)	Vojvodina - Novi sad, SCG
8	Vasa Mijic	11 April 1973	186 cm (6 ft 1 in)	80 kg (180 lb)	332 cm (131 in)	307 cm (121 in)	Vojvodina - Novi Sad, SCG
9	Nikola Grbic	6 September 1973	194 cm (6 ft 4 in)	91 kg (201 lb)	346 cm (136 in)	320 cm (130 in)	Copasystel - Piacenza, ITA
10	Vladimir Grbic	14 December 1970	193 cm (6 ft 4 in)	87 kg (192 lb)	360 cm (140 in)	350 cm (140 in)	Dinamo - Moscow, RUS
11	Novica Bjelica	9 February 1983	202 cm (6 ft 8 in)	97 kg (214 lb)	343 cm (135 in)	324 cm (128 in)	Buducnost Podgorica, SCG
12	Andrija Geric	24 January 1977	203 cm (6 ft 8 in)	101 kg (223 lb)	350 cm (140 in)	323 cm (127 in)	Lube Banka - Mecerata, ITA
13	Goran Vujevic	27 February 1973	192 cm (6 ft 4 in)	94 kg (207 lb)	339 cm (133 in)	315 cm (124 in)	Icom Latina, ITA
14	Ivan Miljkovic	13 September 1979	206 cm (6 ft 9 in)	88 kg (194 lb)	354 cm (139 in)	333 cm (131 in)	Lube Banka Macerata, ITA
15	Ivan Ilic	19 December 1976	194 cm (6 ft 4 in)	85 kg (187 lb)	337 cm (133 in)	318 cm (125 in)	Buducnost Podgorica, SCG
16	Nikola Rosic	5 August 1984	192 cm (6 ft 4 in)	80 kg (180 lb)	323 cm (127 in)	304 cm (120 in)	Partizan Beograd, SCG
17	Milan Markovic	20 January 1980	203 cm (6 ft 8 in)	101 kg (223 lb)	348 cm (137 in)	321 cm (126 in)	Olympiakos - Athens, GRE
18	Andjelko Dangubic	6 September 1983	209 cm (6 ft 10 in)	90 kg (200 lb)	335 cm (132 in)	326 cm (128 in)	Buducnost Podgorica, SCG

== Spain ==
The following is the roster in the 2004 FIVB Volleyball World League.

No.	Name	Date of birth	Height	Weight	Spike	Block	2004 club
1	Rafael Pascual	16 March 1970	194 cm (6 ft 4 in)	88 kg (194 lb)	355 cm (140 in)	329 cm (130 in)	Gioca del Colle, ITA
2	Gustavo Saucedo	5 January 1978	191 cm (6 ft 3 in)	91 kg (201 lb)	346 cm (136 in)	325 cm (128 in)	Nice Volley-ball, FRA
3	Miguel Angel Falasca	29 April 1973	194 cm (6 ft 4 in)	90 kg (200 lb)	345 cm (136 in)	322 cm (127 in)	C.V. Son Amar, Palma Mallorca
4	Alfonso Flores	24 August 1975	189 cm (6 ft 2 in)	90 kg (200 lb)	340 cm (130 in)	330 cm (130 in)	Numancia Caja Duero, Soria (E
5	Luis Pedro Suela	7 July 1976	195 cm (6 ft 5 in)	85 kg (187 lb)	343 cm (135 in)	320 cm (130 in)	Gioca del Colle, ITA
6	Israel Rodríguez	27 August 1981	194 cm (6 ft 4 in)	85 kg (187 lb)	343 cm (135 in)	325 cm (128 in)	C.V. Elche, Elche / Alicante
7	Jordi Gens	21 July 1978	188 cm (6 ft 2 in)	82 kg (181 lb)	342 cm (135 in)	325 cm (128 in)	Nice Volley-ball, FRA
8	Pedro Cabrera	31 October 1978	205 cm (6 ft 9 in)	99 kg (218 lb)	336 cm (132 in)	325 cm (128 in)	C.S. Gran Canaria, Las Palmas
9	Alexis Valido	9 March 1976	188 cm (6 ft 2 in)	85 kg (187 lb)	325 cm (128 in)	312 cm (123 in)	VB Friedrichschafen, GER
10	Cosme Prenafeta	9 December 1971	188 cm (6 ft 2 in)	86 kg (190 lb)	325 cm (128 in)	316 cm (124 in)	Unicaja Almería, ESP
11	Carlos Luis Carreno	19 April 1973	198 cm (6 ft 6 in)	82 kg (181 lb)	345 cm (136 in)	321 cm (126 in)	Unicaja Almería, ESP
12	Guillermo Falasca	24 October 1977	200 cm (6 ft 7 in)	102 kg (225 lb)	340 cm (130 in)	325 cm (128 in)	Taviano, ITA
13	José Antonio Casilla	29 August 1979	199 cm (6 ft 6 in)	88 kg (194 lb)	345 cm (136 in)	315 cm (124 in)	C.V. Unicaja, Almería (ESP)
14	Jose Luis Molto	29 June 1975	206 cm (6 ft 9 in)	94 kg (207 lb)	352 cm (139 in)	329 cm (130 in)	C.V. Son Amar, Palma de Mallo
15	Manuel Sevillano	2 July 1981	193 cm (6 ft 4 in)	84 kg (185 lb)	342 cm (135 in)	319 cm (126 in)	Numancia Caja Duero, Soria (Es
16	Juan Jose Salvador	18 December 1975	200 cm (6 ft 7 in)	90 kg (200 lb)	352 cm (139 in)	329 cm (130 in)	C.V. Unicaja, Almería (ESP)
17	Jose Luis Lobato	19 February 1977	188 cm (6 ft 2 in)	85 kg (187 lb)	340 cm (130 in)	315 cm (124 in)	C.V. Arona Tenerife Sur, Arona
18	Juan Bosco Alcaraz	27 September 1984	205 cm (6 ft 9 in)	90 kg (200 lb)	350 cm (140 in)	335 cm (132 in)	P.T.V. Málaga (ESP)
