= Laurent Capet =

French volleyball player

Medal record

Men's volleyball

Representing France

World Championship
Bronze medal – third place	2002 Buenos Aires	Team

European Championship
Silver medal – second place	2003 Berlin	Team

Laurent Capet (born 5 May 1972 in Dieppe, Seine-Maritime) is a French volleyball player, who won the bronze medal with the Men's National Team at the 2002 World Championships in Argentina.

== International Competitions ==
- 1993 – European Championship (9th place)
- 1997 – European Championship (4th place)
- 1999 – World League (7th place)
- 1999 – European Championship (6th place)
- 2000 – World League (7th place)
- 2001 – World League (6th place)
- 2001 – European Championship (7th place)
- 2002 – World League (7th place)
- 2002 – World Championship (bronze medal)
- 2003 – World League (10th place)
- 2003 – European Championship (silver medal)
- 2003 – FIVB World Cup (5th place)
- 2004 – World League (5th place)
- 2004 – Summer Olympics (9th place)
