= Loïc De Kergret =

French volleyball player

Medal record

Men's Volleyball

Representing France

World Championships
Bronze medal – third place	2002 Buenos Aires	Team

European Championships
Silver medal – second place	2003 Berlin	Team

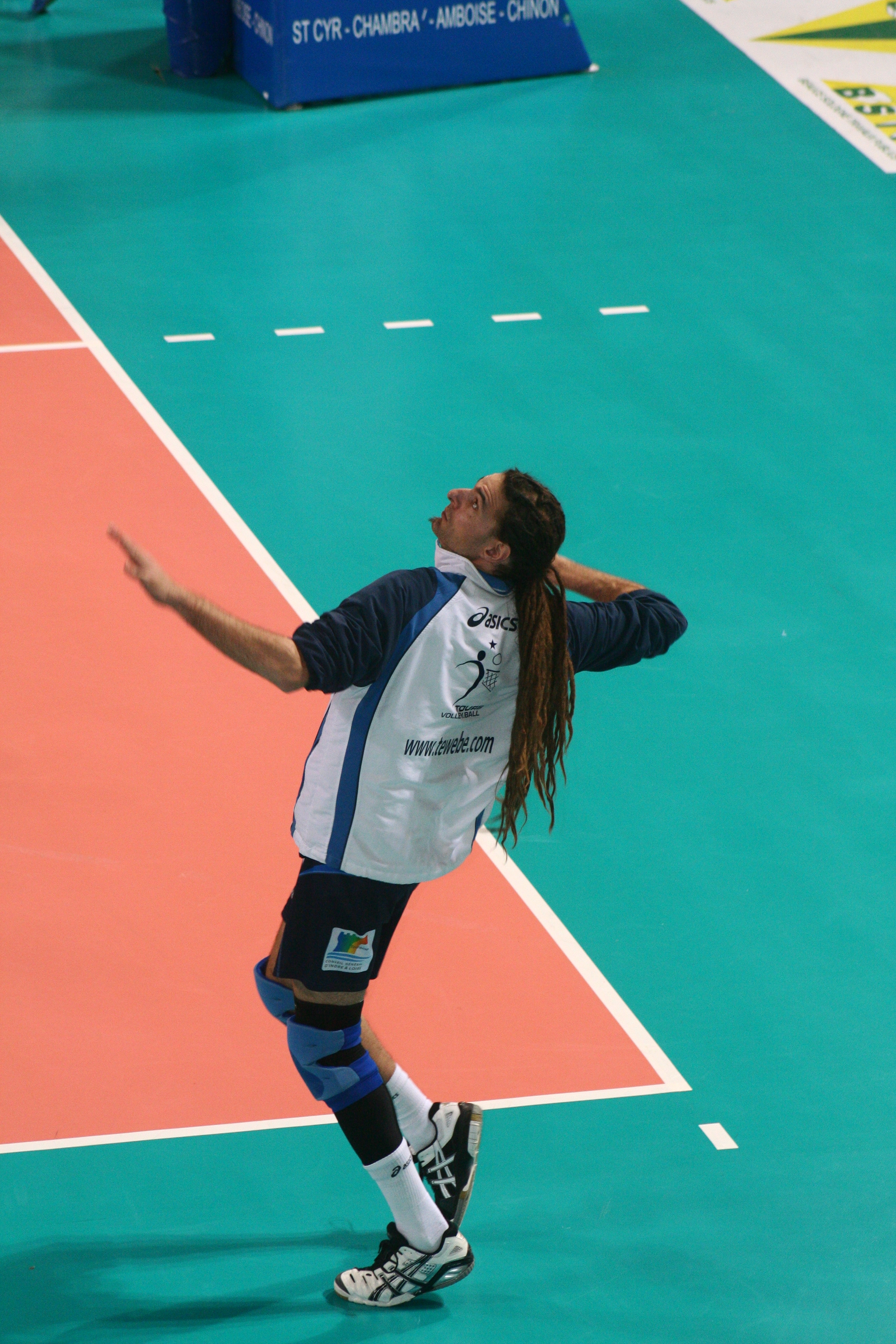
Loïc De Kergret

Loïc De Kergret (born 20 August 1970 in Paris) is a French volleyball player, who won the bronze medal with the Men's National Team at the 2002 World Championships in Argentina.

With Tours VB he won the silver medal at the Men's CEV Champions League 2006–07 and was awarded Final Four' "Best Setter".

== International Competitions ==
- 1997 – European Championship (4th place)
- 1999 – World League (7th place)
- 1999 – European Championship (6th place)
- 2000 – World League (7th place)
- 2002 – World League (7th place)
- 2002 – World Championship (bronze medal)
- 2003 – European Championship (silver medal)
- 2003 – FIVB World Cup (5th place)
- 2004 – World League (5th place)
- 2004 – Summer Olympics (9th place)

== Clubs ==
- (France) Tours VB (2006-2007)

== Awards ==
=== Individuals ===
- 2006–07 CEV Champions League "Best Setter"
