= Marcelo Elgarten =

Brazilian volleyball player (born 1974)

Personal information
- Nickname: Marcelinho
- Nationality: (Brazil) Brazilian
- Born: 9 November 1974 (age 51); Rio de Janeiro, Brazil
- Height: 1.86 m (6 ft 1 in)
- Weight: 84 kg (185 lb)
- Spike: 321 cm (126 in)
- Block: 308 cm (121 in)

Volleyball information
- Position: Setter
- Current club: Retired

Career
| Years | Teams |
|---|---|
| 1987–1992; 1992–1998; 1998–1999; 1999–2000; 2000–2001; 2001–2003; 2003–2004; 2005–2008; 2008–2009; 2009–2011; 2011; 2011–2014; 2014–2015; 2015–2017; 2017–2018; 2018–2019 | CIB Rio De Janeiro; Report Suzano; Olimpikus; Palermo Volley; Ulbra/Canoas; Wizard Suzano; Unisul Esporte Clube; Panathinaikos; Unisul Esporte Clube; EC Pinheiros; Sisley Treviso; Vivo/Minas; Sesi São Paulo; Pallavolo Lugano; Botafogo; Corinthians-Guarulhos |

National team
| 1999–2008 | Brazil |
Honours
Men's volleyball
Representing Brazil
| Event | 1st | 2nd | 3rd |
|---|---|---|---|
| Olympic Games | 0 | 1 | 0 |
| World Championship | 1 | 0 | 0 |
| World Cup | 1 | 0 | 0 |
| World Grand Champions Cup | 1 | 0 | 0 |
| World League | 5 | 1 | 2 |
| Pan American Games | 1 | 1 | 0 |
| Total | 9 | 3 | 2 |
Olympic Games
| Silver medal – second place | 2008 Beijing | Team |
World Championship
| Gold medal – first place | 2006 Japan | Team |
World Cup
| Gold medal – first place | 2007 Japan | Team |
World Grand Champions Cup
| Gold medal – first place | 2005 Japan | Team |
World League
| Gold medal – first place | 2001 Katowice | |
| Gold medal – first place | 2004 Rome | Team |
| Gold medal – first place | 2005 Belgrade | Team |
| Gold medal – first place | 2006 Moscow | Team |
| Gold medal – first place | 2007 Katowice | Team |
| Silver medal – second place | 2002 Belo Horizonte | |
| Bronze medal – third place | 1999 Mar del Plata | |
| Bronze medal – third place | 2000 Rotterdam | |
Pan American Games
| Gold medal – first place | 2007 Rio de Janeiro | Team |
| Silver medal – second place | 1999 Winnipeg | Team |

Marcelo Elgarten (born 9 November 1974), commonly known as Marcelinho, is a Brazilian former volleyball player. He won a silver medal at the 2008 Summer Olympics.

Elgarten was born in Rio de Janeiro, and is Jewish.

== Individual awards ==
- 2007 Pan-American Games "Best Setter"
- Men's World Cup 2007; Rated 3rd best setter

== See also ==
- List of notable Jewish volleyball players
