= Nobuharu =

- Gender: Male

Origin
- Origin: Japanese
- Meaning: Different meanings depending on the kanji used

Nobuharu (written: 宣治, 信春 or 信治) is a masculine Japanese given name. Notable people with the name include:

- Nobuharu Asahara (朝原 宣治; born 1972), Japanese sprinter and long jumper
- Baba Nobuharu (馬場 信春; 1514/15–1575), Japanese samurai
- Oda Nobuharu (織田 信治; 1549–1570), Japanese samurai
- Nobuharu Saito (齋藤 信治; born 1973), Japanese volleyball player
- Yagyu Nobuharu (柳生 延春; 1919–2007), Japanese swordsman
- Nobuharu Matsushita (松下 信治; born 1993), Japanese racing driver
