= Luigi Mastrangelo =

Italian volleyball player (born 1975)

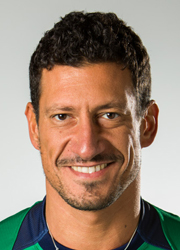
- Mastrangelo with Piemonte in 2011

Personal information
- Full name: Luigi Mastrangelo
- Nickname: Gigi
- Nationality: Italian
- Born: 17 August 1975 (age 51); Mottola, Italy
- Height: 2.02 m (6 ft 8 in)
- Weight: 90 kg (198 lb)
- Spike: 368 cm (145 in)
- Block: 336 cm (132 in)

Volleyball information
- Position: Middle-blocker
- Current team: (Italy) Bre Banca Lannutti Cuneo

National team
| 1999-2012 | Italy (363) |
Honours
Men's volleyball
Representing Italy
Olympic Games
| Silver medal – second place | 2004 Athens |
| Bronze medal – third place | 2000 Sydney |
| Bronze medal – third place | 2012 London |
World Cup
| Silver medal – second place | 2003 Japan |
European Championship
| Gold medal – first place | 1999 Austria |
| Gold medal – first place | 2003 Germany |
| Gold medal – first place | 2005 Italy/Serbia and Montenegro |
| Silver medal – second place | 2011 Austria/Czech Republic |
World League
| Gold medal – first place | 1999 Mar del Plata |
| Gold medal – first place | 2000 Rotterdam |
| Silver medal – second place | 2001 Katowice |
| Silver medal – second place | 2004 Rome |
| Bronze medal – third place | 2003 Madrid |
- Last updated: 5 October 2016

Luigi Mastrangelo (born 17 August 1975) is an Italian men's volleyball player, a member of Italy men's national volleyball team 1999-2012. Mastrangelo with national team winner silver and bronze medalist of the Olympic Games, multiple winner of the European Championship and World League. He was the star of the Italian team in their course.

== Career ==
=== Clubs ===
| Club | Country | From | To |
|---|---|---|---|
| Cuneo VBC | Italy | 1994 | 1995 |
| VBC Mondovì | Italy | 1995 | 1996 |
| PV Sant'Antioco | Italy | 1996 | 1997 |
| Piemonte Volley | Italy | 1997 | 2002 |
| Lube Banca Macerata | Italy | 2002 | 2005 |
| Pallavolo Modena | Italy | 2005 | 2006 |
| M. Roma Volley | Italy | 2006 | 2008 |
| Martina Franca Volley | Italy | 2008 | 2009 |
| Bre Banca Lannutti Cuneo | Italy | 2009 | 2014 |

== Sporting achievements ==
=== Individually ===
- 1999 FIVB World League - Best Server
- 2001 FIVB World League - Best Server
- 2003 CEV European Championship - Best Blocker
- 2004 FIVB World League - Best Blocker
- 2005 CEV European Championship - Best Blocker
- 2008 CEV Cup - Best Blocker
- 2008 CEV Cup - Best Server
- 2009 Volleyit Magazine - Player of the Year Italy
- 2011 Memorial of Hubert Jerzy Wagner - Best Blocker

=== State awards ===
- 2000 Knight's Order of Merit of the Italian Republic
- 2004 Officer's Order of Merit of the Italian Republic

Awards
| Preceded by (Federal Republic of Yugoslavia) Goran Vujević | Best Server of FIVB World League; 2001 | Succeeded by (Russia) Vadim Khamuttskikh |
| Preceded by (France) Dominique Daquin | Best Blocker of CEV European Championship; 2003; 2005 | Succeeded by (Spain) José Luis Moltó |
| Preceded by (Federal Republic of Yugoslavia) Andrija Gerić | Best Blocker of FIVB World League; 2004 | Succeeded by (Brazil) Dante Amaral |
| Preceded by - | Best Blocker of CEV Cup; 2007/2008 | Succeeded by (Bulgaria) Vladimir Nikolov |
| Preceded by - | Best Server of CEV Cup; 2007/2008 | Succeeded by (Russia) Sergey Khoroshev |
