= Marco Meoni =

Italian volleyball player (born 1973)

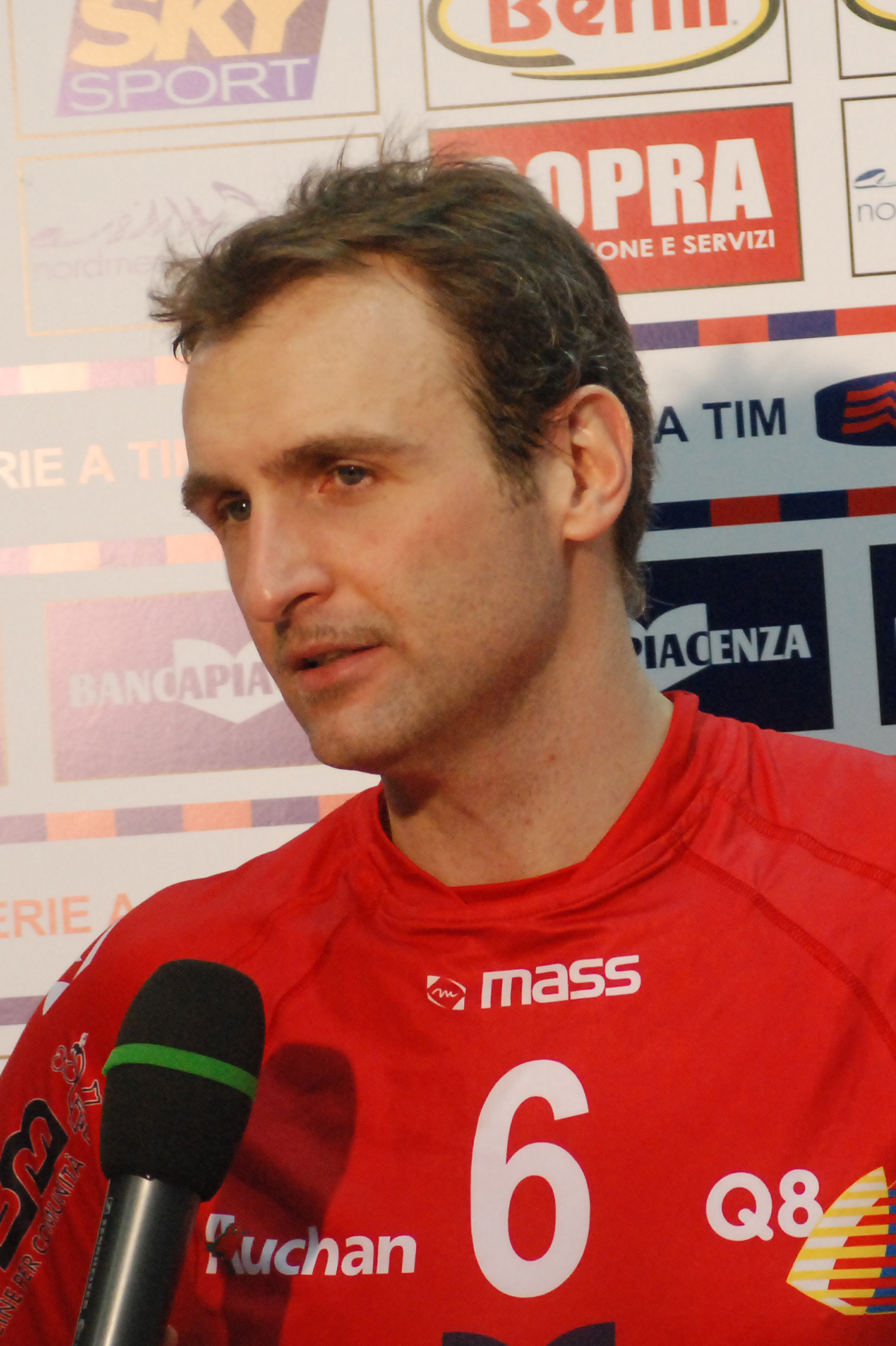
- Meoni with Piacenza in 2009

Personal information
- Born: 25 May 1973 (age 53); Padua, Italy
- Height: 197 cm (6 ft 6 in)

Volleyball information
- Position: Setter
- Number: 2; 6 (2008)

National team
1994-2008	Italy
Honours
Men's volleyball
Representing Italy
Olympic Games
Silver medal – second place	1996 Atlanta	Team
Bronze medal – third place	2000 Sydney	Team
World Championship
Gold medal – first place	1998 Japan	Team
FIVB World Cup
Silver medal – second place	2003 Japan	Team
World League
Gold medal – first place	1995 Rio de Janeiro
Gold medal – first place	1997 Moscow
Gold medal – first place	1999 Mar del Plata
Gold medal – first place	2000 Rotterdam
Silver medal – second place	1996 Rotterdam
Bronze medal – third place	2003 Madrid
European Championship
Gold medal – first place	1995 Greece
Gold medal – first place	1999 Austria
Gold medal – first place	2003 Germany
Silver medal – second place	2001 Czech Republic
Bronze medal – third place	1997 Netherlands

Marco Meoni (born 25 May 1973) is a volleyball player from Italy, who won the silver medal with the Men's National Team at the 1996 Summer Olympics, wearing the number two jersey. A year earlier he was on the side that claimed the European title in Greece. He is a two-time Olympian for his native country, also winning bronze at the 2000 Summer Olympics in Sydney, Australia.

With Copra Piacenza he won the silver medal at the 2007-08 Indesit Champions League and also was individually awarded "Most Valuable Player". After retiring in 2013, he returned to play in Italy's Superlega in January 2015, again for Copra Piacenza.

== Clubs ==
- (Italy) Copra Piacenza (2007–2008)

== Awards ==
=== Individuals ===
- 2007–08 CEV Indesit Champions League Final Four "Best Setter"

=== Clubs ===
- 2007–08 CEV Indesit Champions League - Runner-Up, with Copra Piacenza
