= Samuele Papi =

Italian volleyball player

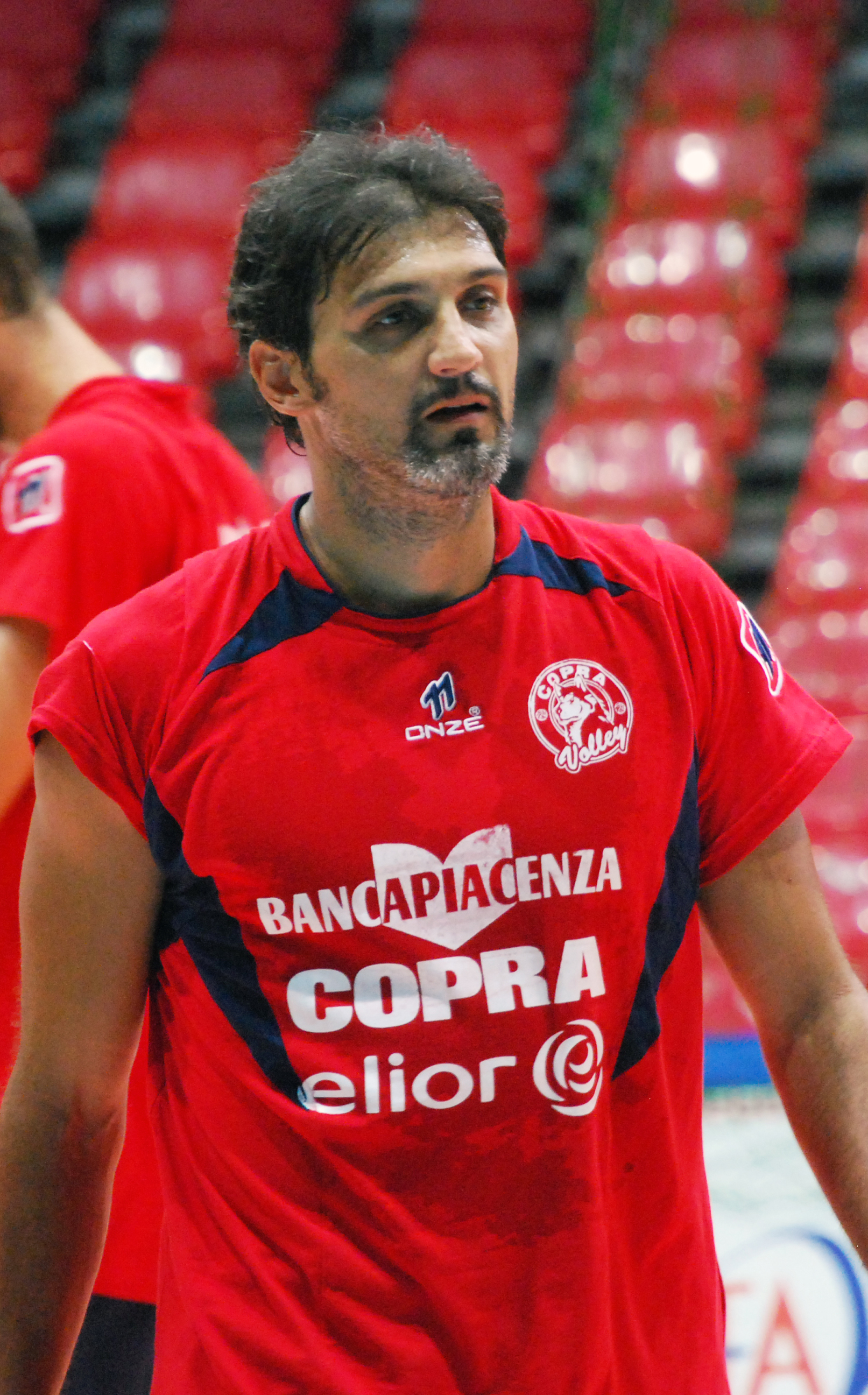
- Papi with Piacenza in 2011

Personal information
- Born: 20 May 1973 (age 53); Ancona, Italy
- Height: 1.91 m (6 ft 3 in)
- Weight: 84 kg (185 lb)
- Spike: 345 cm (136 in)
- Block: 310 cm (122 in)

Volleyball information
- Position: Outside hitter
- Number: 6

Career
Years	Teams
1990–1994; 1994–1998; 1998–2011; 2011–2017	Pallavolo Falconara; Bre Banca Lannutti Cuneo; Sisley Treviso; LPR Piacenza

National team
1993–2012	Italy (361)
Honours
Men's volleyball
Representing Italy
Olympic Games
Silver medal – second place	1996 Atlanta
Silver medal – second place	2004 Athens
Bronze medal – third place	2000 Sydney
Bronze medal – third place	2012 London
World Championship
Gold medal – first place	1994 Greece
Gold medal – first place	1998 Japan
World Cup
Gold medal – first place	1995 Japan
Silver medal – second place	2003 Japan
Bronze medal – third place	1999 Japan
World League
Gold medal – first place	1994 Milan
Gold medal – first place	1995 Rio de Janeiro
Gold medal – first place	1997 Moscow
Gold medal – first place	1999 Mar del Plata
Gold medal – first place	2000 Rotterdam
Silver medal – second place	1996 Rotterdam
Silver medal – second place	2001 Katowice
Silver medal – second place	2004 Rome
Bronze medal – third place	2003 Madrid
European Championship
Gold medal – first place	1995 Greece
Gold medal – first place	1999 Austria
Gold medal – first place	2003 Germany
Silver medal – second place	2001 Czech Republic
Bronze medal – third place	1997 Netherlands
- Last updated: 3 January 2018

Samuele Papi (born 20 May 1973) is an Italian former volleyball player, a member of Italy men's national volleyball team in 1993–2012, silver and bronze medalist of the Olympic Games, multiple winner of the European Championship and World Championship, silver medalist of the World Cup 2003, three-time CEV Champions League winner, double CEV Cup winner, four-time Challenge Cup winner, six-time Italian Champion.

== Career ==
Papi won five Italian titles, three European Champions cups, and, with the Italian national team, two World Championships (1994 and 1998) and three European Championships. He competed at four Summer Olympics, winning two silver medals and two bronze medals.

== Individual awards ==
- 2003 European Championship "Best Receiver"
- 2004 FIVB Volleyball World League "Best Spiker"

== Awards ==
- 2000 Knight's Order of Merit of the Italian Republic
- 2004 Officer's Order of Merit of the Italian Republic

== See also ==
- Legends of Italian sport - Walk of Fame
