= Alessandro Fei (volleyball) =

Italian volleyball player (born 1978)

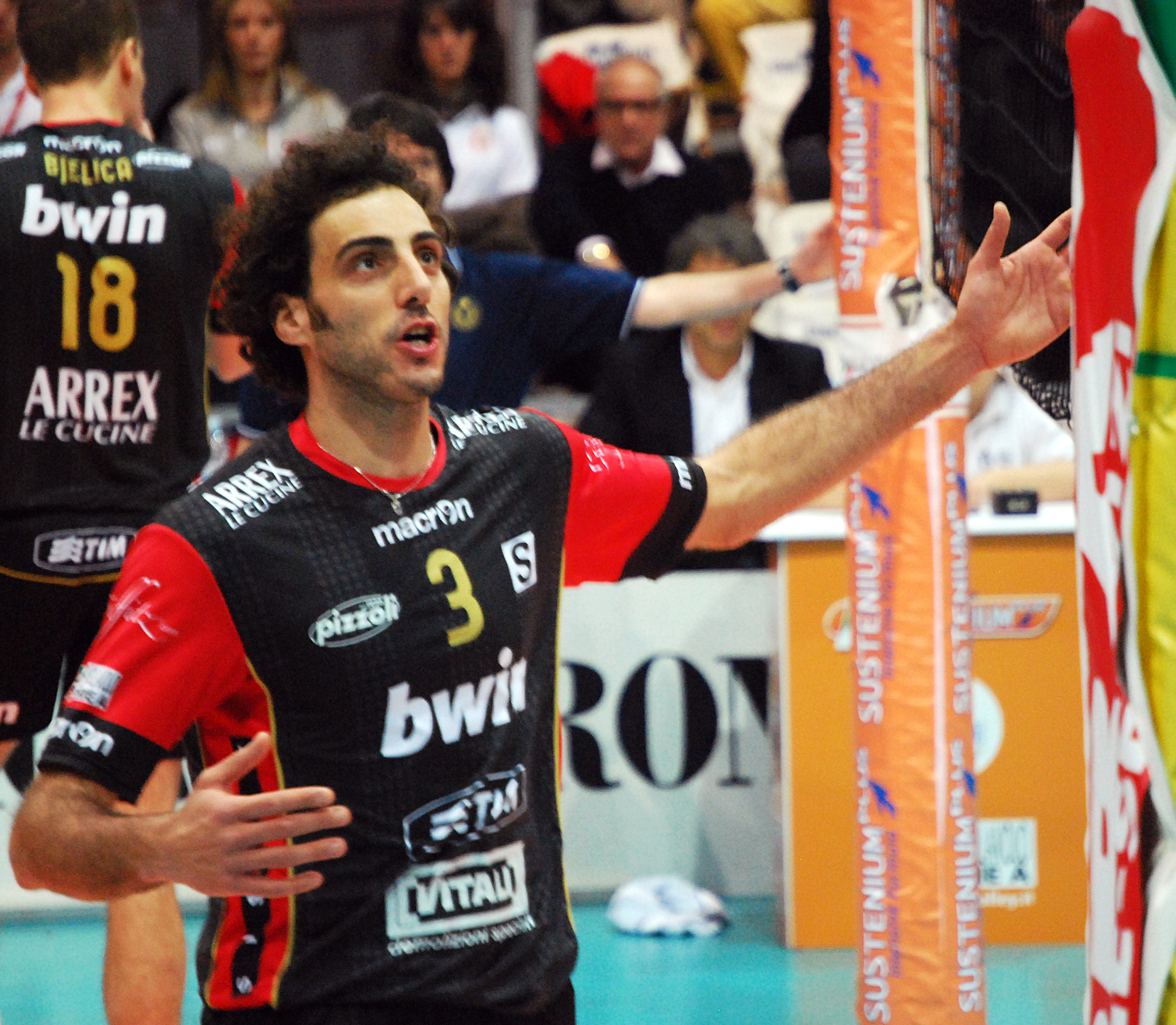

Personal information
- Nationality: Italian
- Born: 29 November 1978 (age 47); Saronno, Italy
- Hometown: Foiano, Italy
- Height: 2.04 m (6 ft 8 in)
- Weight: 90 kg (198 lb)
- Spike: 358 cm (141 in)
- Block: 336 cm (132 in)

Volleyball information
- Position: Opposite
- Number: 3

Career
Years	Teams
1993–1994; 1994–1998; 1998–2001; 2001–2011; 2011–2012; 2012–2014; 2014–2016; 2016–	Pallavolo Foiano; Petrarca Padova; Lube Banca Macerata; Sisley Treviso; Sisley Belluno; Copra Elior Piacenza; Cucine Lube Civitanova; Ninfa Latina

National team
1998-	Italy (310)
Honours
Men's volleyball
Representing Italy
Olympic Games
Silver medal – second place	2004 Athens
Bronze medal – third place	2000 Sydney
Bronze medal – third place	2012 London
World Championship
Gold medal – first place	1998 Japan
European Championship
Gold medal – first place	2003 Germany
Gold medal – first place	2005 Italy/Serbia and Montenegro
Silver medal – second place	2001 Czech Republic
World League
Gold medal – first place	1999 Mar del Plata
Gold medal – first place	2000 Rotterdam
Silver medal – second place	2001 Katowice
Silver medal – second place	2004 Rome
Bronze medal – third place	2003 Madrid
- Last updated: 9 February 2017

Alessandro Fei (born 29 November 1978) is an Italian men's volleyball player, a member of Italy men's national volleyball team and Italian club Ninfa Latina. Fei was a silver and bronze medalist at the Olympic Games, World Champion 1998, European Champion (2003, 2005), silver medalist of the European Championship 2001, medalist of the World League (gold in 1999, 2000, silver in 2001, 2004, bronze in 2003), CEV Champions League winner, three-time CEV Cup winner, Challenge Cup winner, four-time Italian Champion.

He was chosen among the 2005 Italian League All-Star team. With Sisley Treviso, Fei won the 2005–06 CEV Champions League and was awarded "Most Valuable Player" and "Best Server".

== Sporting achievements ==
=== Clubs ===
==== CEV Champions League ====
- 2005/2006 - with Sisley Treviso
- 2014/2015 - with Cucine Lube Civitanova

==== CEV Cup ====
- 2000/2001 - with Lube Banca Macerata
- 2002/2003 - with Sisley Treviso
- 2010/2011 - with Sisley Treviso

==== Challenge Cup ====
- 2012/2013 - with Copra Elior Piacenza

==== National championships ====
- 2000/2001 Italian Cup, with Lube Banca Macerata
- 2001/2002 Italian SuperCup2001, with Sisley Treviso
- 2002/2003 Italian Championship, with Sisley Treviso
- 2003/2004 Italian SuperCup2003, with Sisley Treviso
- 2003/2004 Italian Championship, with Sisley Treviso
- 2003/2004 Italian Cup, with Sisley Treviso
- 2004/2005 Italian SuperCup2004, with Sisley Treviso
- 2004/2005 Italian Cup, with Sisley Treviso
- 2004/2005 Italian Championship, with Sisley Treviso
- 2005/2006 Italian SuperCup2005, with Sisley Treviso
- 2006/2007 Italian Cup, with Sisley Treviso
- 2006/2007 Italian Championship, with Sisley Treviso
- 2007/2008 Italian SuperCup2007, with Sisley Treviso

=== National team ===
- 1998 FIVB World Championship
- 1999 FIVB World League
- 2000 FIVB World League
- 2000 Olympic Games
- 2001 FIVB World League
- 2001 CEV European Championship
- 2003 CEV European Championship
- 2003 FIVB World League
- 2004 FIVB World League
- 2004 Olympic Games
- 2005 CEV European Championship
- 2005 FIVB World Grand Champions Cup
- 2012 Olympic Games

=== Individual ===
- 2004 Italian SuperCup - Most Valuable Player
- 2005 Italian SuperCup - Most Valuable Player
- 2005 FIVB World Grand Champions Cup - Best Spiker
- 2006 CEV Champions League - Best Server
- 2006 CEV Champions League - Most Valuable Player
- 2014 Italian Cup - Most Valuable Player

=== State awards ===
- 2000 Knight's Order of Merit of the Italian Republic
- 2004 Officer's Order of Merit of the Italian Republic

Awards
Preceded by (South Korea) Kim Sang-Woo	Best Spiker of FIVB World Grand Champions Cup; 2005	Succeeded by (Japan) Tatsuya Fukuzawa
Preceded by (United States) Clayton Stanley	Best Server of CEV Champions League; 2005/2006	Succeeded by (Bulgaria) Matey Kaziyski
Preceded by (Bulgaria) Vladimir Nikolov	Most Valuable Player of CEV Champions League; 2005/2006	Succeeded by (Germany) Jochen Schöps
