= Matej Černič =

Italian volleyball player (born 1978)

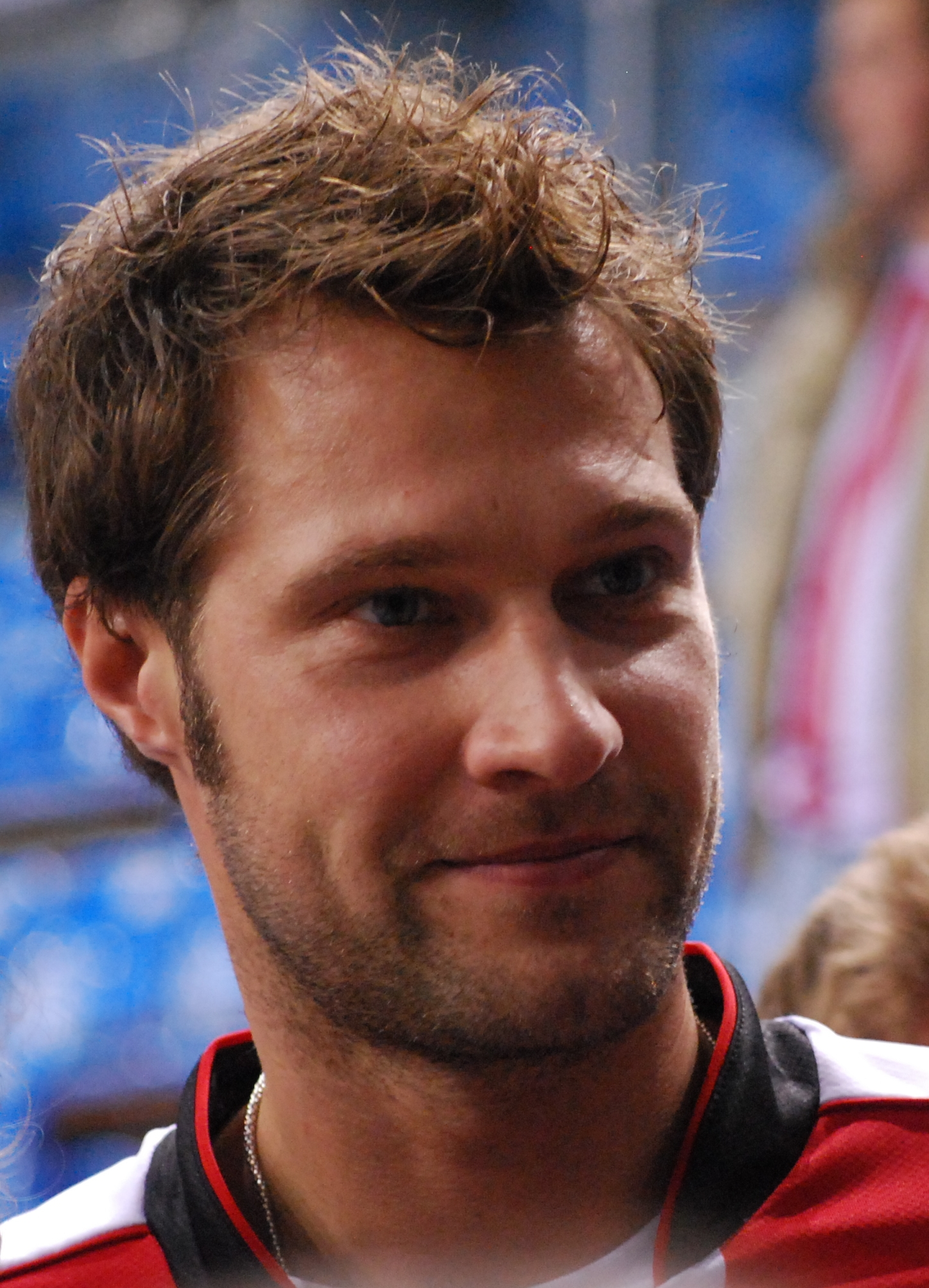

Personal information
- Full name: Matej Černič
- Born: 13 September 1978 (age 48); Gorizia, Italy
- Height: 1.92 m (6 ft 4 in)
- Weight: 80 kg (176 lb)
- Spike: 355 cm (140 in)
- Block: 336 cm (132 in)

Volleyball information
- Position: Outside hitter
- Current team: Azzurra Alessano

Career
Years	Teams
1997–1998; 1998–2002; 2002–2005; 2005–2006; 2006–2007; 2007–2008; 2008–2009; 2009–2010; 2010–2011; 2011–2012; 2012–2013; 2013–2014; 2014–2015; 2015–	Zinella Volley Bologna; 4Torri Ferrara; Pallavolo Modena; Iraklis Thessaloniki; Fakel Novy Urengoy; Dinamo Moscow; Martina Franca Volley; Perugia Volley; Asseco Resovia Rzeszów; Tonno Callipo Vibo Valentia; Fenerbahçe Grundig; Corigliano Volley; Pallavolo Matera Bulls; Azzurra Alessano

National team
1998–2010	Italy
Honours
Men's volleyball
Representing Italy
Olympic Games
Silver medal – second place	2004 Athens
World Cup
Silver medal – second place	2003 Japan
European Championship
Gold medal – first place	2003 Germany
Gold medal – first place	2005 Serbia/Italy and Montenegro
World League
Silver medal – second place	2004 Rome
Bronze medal – third place	2003 Madrid
- Last updated: 19 February 2017

Matej Černič (born 13 September 1978) is an Italian volleyball player who won the silver medal with the Italian men's national team at the 2004 Summer Olympics, held in Athens. He is of Slovene ethnicity and belongs to the Slovene minority in Italy.

== Sporting achievements ==
=== Individually ===
- 2009 Memorial of Hubert Jerzy Wagner - Best Receiver

=== State awards ===
- 2004 Officer's Order of Merit of the Italian Republic
