= Daisuke Usami =

Japanese volleyball player (born 1979)

Personal information
- Full name: Daisuke Usami
- Nationality: Japanese
- Born: 29 March 1979 (age 47) Yokote, Akita, Japan
- Height: 1.84 m (6 ft 0 in)
- Weight: 88 kg (194 lb)
- Spike: 320 cm (130 in)
- Block: 310 cm (120 in)

Volleyball information
- Position: Setter

Career
- Years: Team
- 2001–2006: (Japan) Blue Rockets Tokyo
- 2006–2013: (Japan) Panasonic Panthers

National team
- Years: Team
- 2001–2012: Japan

Daisuke Usami (宇佐美 大輔, Usami Daisuke; born March 29, 1979) is a retired Japanese volleyball player. He played as a setter and was one of the key players in the Japan men's national volleyball team in the 2000s. Usami was named Most Spectacular Player at the 2003 FIVB World Cup, where Japan ended in ninth place.

== Honours ==
- 2001 FIVB World League — 9th place
- 2002 World Championship — 9th place
- 2003 FIVB World League — 13th place
- 2003 FIVB World Cup — 9th place
- 2004 FIVB World League — 10th place
- 2007 FIVB World Cup — 9th place

== Individual awards ==
- 2003 FIVB Men's World Cup#Awards — Most Spectacular Player

== Sources ==
- FIVB biography
