= Milan Marković (volleyball) =

Montenegrin volleyball player (born 1980)

Personal information
- Born: 20 January 1980 (age 46)
Medal record
Men's volleyball
Representing Serbia and Montenegro
World League
Silver medal – second place	2005 Belgrade	Team
Bronze medal – third place	2004 Rome	Team

Milan Marković (born 20 January 1980) is volleyball player in Podgorica.

He was member of Serbia and Montenegro national team from 2001 to 2005. From 2006 he played for Montenegro national team.

He was a member of the national team representing Serbia and Montenegro at the 2004 Summer Olympics in Athens. He won a silver medal in the 2005 FIVB Volleyball World League and a bronze medal 2004.
