= Takahiro Yamamoto =

Japanese male volleyball player

Personal information
- Full name: Takahiro Yamamoto
- Nationality: Japanese
- Born: 12 July 1978 (age 48); Tottori, Tottori, Japan
- Height: 2.01 m (6 ft 7 in)
- Weight: 90 kg (200 lb)
- Spike: 345 cm (136 in)
- Block: 331 cm (130 in)

Volleyball information
- Position: Opposite spiker
- Current team: (Japan) Panasonic Panthers

National team
2001–2012	Japan

Takahiro Yamamoto (山本 隆弘; born July 12, 1978) is a retired volleyball player from Japan, who was one of the key players in the Japan men's national volleyball team in the 2000s. On club level, he only played for Panasonic Panthers.

Yamamoto plays as a wing-spiker and was named Best Scorer and Best Server at the 2008 Olympic Qualification Tournament.

== Honours ==
- 2001 FIVB World League — 9th place
- 2001 World Grand Champions Cup — 5th place
- 2002 FIVB World League — 13th place
- 2002 World Championship — 9th place
- 2003 FIVB World League — 13th place
- 2003 FIVB World Cup — 9th place
- 2004 FIVB World League — 10th place
- 2006 World Championship — 8th place
- 2008 Olympic Qualification Tournament — 2nd place (qualified)

== Individual awards ==
- 2003 FIVB World Cup — Most Valuable Player
- 2003 FIVB World Cup — Best Scorer

== Sources ==
- FIVB biography
