= 2005 Men's European Volleyball Championship =

Tournament details
- Host country: Italy; Serbia and Montenegro
- Dates: September 2–11
- Teams: 16
- Venues: 2 (in 2 host cities)

Final positions
- Champions: Italy (6th title)

Tournament awards
- MVP: (Italy) Alberto Cisolla

The 24th Men's European Volleyball Championship was the first continental volleyball competition hosted by two nations – Serbia and Montenegro and Italy, namely in their respective capitals, Belgrade and Rome. Championship took place from September 2 to September 11, 2005.

== Teams ==
Preliminary competitions consisted of two groups with six teams each, based in Rome and Belgrade, with first two teams from each groups progressing to semi-finals.

Group A – Rome (PalaLottomatica)

- Croatia
- Italy
- Poland
- Portugal
- Russia
- Ukraine

Group B – Belgrade (Belgrade Arena)

- France
- Greece
- Netherlands
- Czech Republic
- Serbia and Montenegro
- Spain

== Preliminary round ==
- All times are Central European Summer Time (UTC+02:00).

=== Pool A ===
- venue: PalaLottomatica, Rome, Italy

Pos	Team	Pld	W	L	Pts	SW	SL	SR	SPW	SPL	SPR	Qualification
1	Russia	5	5	0	10	15	5	3.000	485	444	1.092	Semifinals
2	Italy	5	4	1	9	13	4	3.250	453	370	1.224	Semifinals
3	Poland	5	3	2	8	10	7	1.429	413	387	1.067	
4	Croatia	5	2	3	7	9	9	1.000	427	442	0.966	
5	Portugal	5	1	4	6	6	14	0.429	409	458	0.893	
6	Ukraine	5	0	5	5	3	15	0.200	380	426	0.892	

September 3, 2005
Poland	3-0	Croatia	PalaLottomatica	15:30
Italy	3-0	Portugal	PalaLottomatica	18:00
Ukraine	0-3	Russia	PalaLottomatica	21:00
September 4, 2005
Portugal	2-3	Croatia	PalaLottomatica	15:30
Italy	3-0	Ukraine	PalaLottomatica	18:00
Poland	1-3	Russia	PalaLottomatica	21:00
September 5, 2005
Ukraine	2-3	Portugal	PalaLottomatica	15:30
Italy	3-0	Poland	PalaLottomatica	18:00
Croatia	2-3	Russia	PalaLottomatica	21:00
September 7, 2005
Poland	3-1	Ukraine	PalaLottomatica	15:30
Russia	3-1	Portugal	PalaLottomatica	18:00
Italy	3-1	Croatia	PalaLottomatica	21:00
September 8, 2005
Poland	3-0	Portugal	PalaLottomatica	15:30
Croatia	3-0	Ukraine	PalaLottomatica	18:00
Italy	1-3	Russia	PalaLottomatica	21:00

=== Pool B ===
- venue: Belgrade Arena, Belgrade, Serbia and Montenegro

Pos	Team	Pld	W	L	Pts	SW	SL	SR	SPW	SPL	SPR	Qualification
1	Serbia and Montenegro	5	5	0	10	15	3	5.000	432	358	1.207	Semifinals
2	Spain	5	3	2	8	11	10	1.100	458	469	0.977	Semifinals
3	Greece	5	3	2	8	10	11	0.909	472	482	0.979	
4	France	5	2	3	7	12	10	1.200	491	488	1.006	
5	Czech Republic	5	2	3	7	8	11	0.727	425	431	0.986	
6	Netherlands	5	0	5	5	4	15	0.267	391	441	0.887	

September 2, 2005
Greece	3-2	Netherlands	Belgrade Arena	15:30
France	3-0	Czech Republic	Belgrade Arena	18:00
Spain	0-3	Serbia and Montenegro	Belgrade Arena	21:00
September 3, 2005
Netherlands	1-3	France	Belgrade Arena	15:30
Spain	3-1	Greece	Belgrade Arena	18:00
Czech Republic	1-3	Serbia and Montenegro	Belgrade Arena	21:00
September 4, 2005
France	2-3	Spain	Belgrade Arena	15:30
Czech Republic	3-0	Netherlands	Belgrade Arena	18:00
Greece	0-3	Serbia and Montenegro	Belgrade Arena	21:00
September 6, 2005
Spain	2-3	Czech Republic	Belgrade Arena	15:30
Serbia and Montenegro	3-0	Netherlands	Belgrade Arena	18:00
France	2-3	Greece	Belgrade Arena	21:00
September 7, 2005
Netherlands	1-3	Spain	Belgrade Arena	15:30
Czech Republic	1-3	Greece	Belgrade Arena	18:00
France	2-3	Serbia and Montenegro	Belgrade Arena	21:00

== Final round ==
- venue: PalaLottomatica, Rome, Italy
- All times are Central European Summer Time (UTC+02:00).

Semifinals
10 September
Russia	3
Spain	2
10 September
Italy	3
Serbia and Montenegro	2

Final
11 September
Italy	3
Russia	2
3rd place
11 September
Spain	0
Serbia and Montenegro	3

=== Semifinals ===
September 10, 2005
Russia	3-2	Spain	PalaLottomatica	18:00
Italy	3-2	Serbia and Montenegro	PalaLottomatica	21:00

=== Final ===
September 11, 2005
3°/4° place
Serbia and Montenegro	3-0	Spain	PalaLottomatica	18:00
1°/2° place
Italy	3-2	Russia	PalaLottomatica	21:00

== Final ranking ==
Place	Team
1st place, gold medalist(s)	Italy
2nd place, silver medalist(s)	Russia
3rd place, bronze medalist(s)	Serbia and Montenegro
4	Spain
5	Poland
6	Greece
7	France
8	Croatia
9	Czech Republic
10	Portugal
11	Netherlands
12	Ukraine

2005 Men's European champions

Italy
Sixth title

Team Roster

Matej Černič, Alberto Cisolla, Mirko Corsano, Paolo Cozzi, Alessandro Fei, Michal Lasko, Luigi Mastrangelo, Alessandro Paparoni, Cristian Savani, Giacomo Sintini, Luca Tencati, and Valerio Vermiglio.
Head coach: Gian Paolo Montali.

== Individual awards ==
- MVP: Alberto Cisolla (ITA)
- Best server: Ivan Miljković (SCG)
- Best libero: Mirko Corsano (ITA)
- Best setter: Nikola Grbić (SCG)
- Best spiker: Israel Rodríguez (ESP)
- Best blocker: Luigi Mastrangelo (ITA)
- Best receiver: Pavel Abramov (RUS)
