= Yagyu Nobuharu =

Japanese swordsman

Yagyu Nobuharu (January 11, 1919 – May 4, 2007) was a swordsman during the Shōwa period (20th century) of Japan. Nobuharu had been renowned as the 21st head of the famed Yagyu Shinkage ryū art of the sword. Nobuharu had many very treasured illustrated technique drawings of Kamiizumi Nobutsuna, the founder of the Shinkage ryu. Nobuharu had elaborated to many notable swordsmen during the period, such as Morita Monjuro the current transmission of his descended art. Nobuharu had said that the difference between the present day art of the sword greatly differed from the time of Nobutsuna's life when people had fought within armor. Nobuharu had shown that the art of the sword had seemed to be more lax because the present-day warriors wore more ordinary clothing, not armor that would need a powerful amount of energy to break through. During the time of Nobuharu's teachings, subtlety became considered as being more important than strength. Nobuharu would continue to show this to his disciples, thus effectively passing on the proper needed teachings up until his death.
