= Andrea Sartoretti =

Italian volleyball player

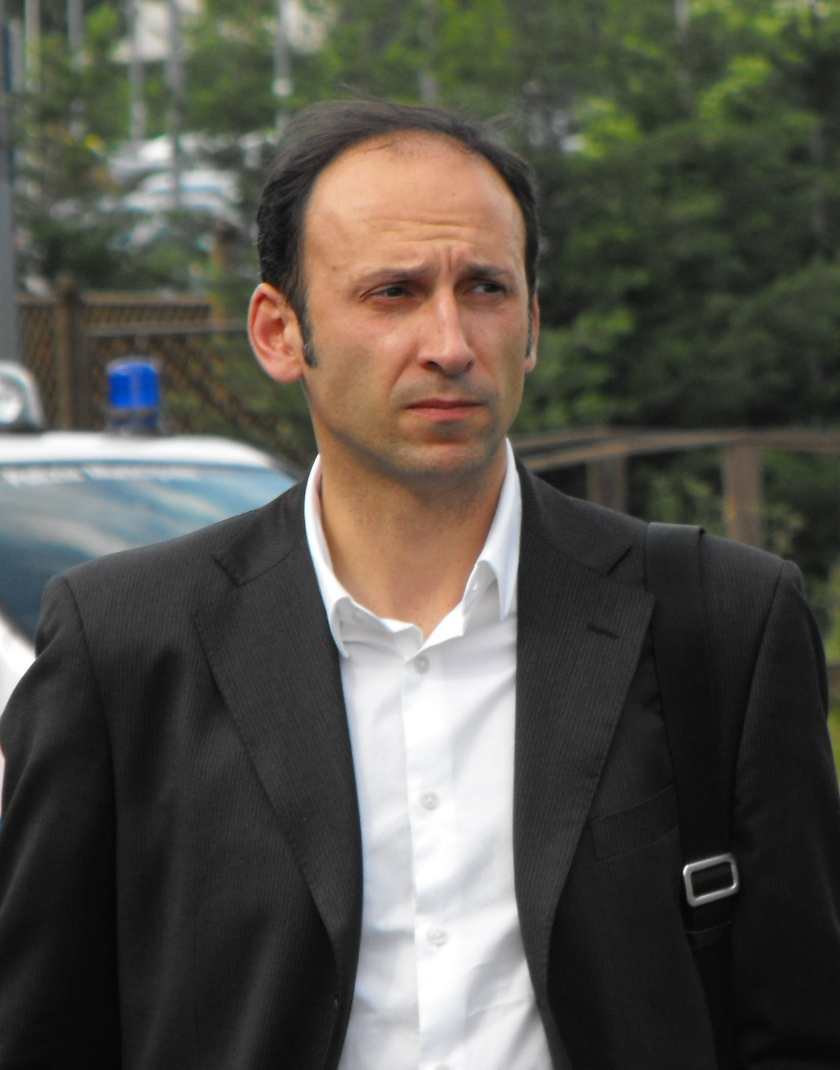

Personal information
- Nickname: Sartorace
- Born: 19 June 1971 (age 55); Perugia, Italy
- Height: 194 cm (6 ft 4 in)
Honours
Men's volleyball
Representing Italy
Olympic Games
Silver medal – second place	1996 Atlanta	Team
Silver medal – second place	2004 Athens	Team
Bronze medal – third place	2000 Sydney	Team
World Cup
Silver medal – second place	2003 Japan	Team
European Championship
Silver medal – second place	2001 Ostrava	Team
Summer Universiade
Bronze medal – third place	1995 Fukuoka	Team

Andrea Sartoretti (born 19 June 1971) is an Italian former volleyball player.

== Biography ==
Born at Perugia, Sartoretti debuted in the Italian Serie in 1991, winning the Award as best Under 23 player. A 1.94 cm athlete, he usually played opposite hitter. Sartoretti was known for his powerful serve, which gained him the nickname of Sartorace.

Sartoretti won one Italian Serie A1 national title in 1997, with Pallavolo Modena. He also won three CEV Champions Leagues and two European Supercups in his stay at Messaggero Ravenna (1991–1996).

Sartoretti earned his first cap for Italy national team in 1993. He won four World Leagues (two times declared MVP), two European (2001 and 2003) and a World (1998) titles. He has won two silver medals and a bronze medal in three Olympic Games between 1996 and 2004.

Sartoretti ended his playing career in 2009. He is currently part GM of Modena Volley. Sartoretti made 330 appearances for the national team of Italy.

== Clubs ==
Team	Country	From	To
Città di Castello	Italy	1988–1989	1990–1991
Ravenna	Italy	1991–1992	1995–1996
Modena	Italy	1996–1997	1996–1997
Montichiari	Italy	1997–1998	1999–2000
Cuneo	Italy	2000–2001	2001–2002
Trento	Italy	2002–2003	2004–2005
Modena	Italy	2005–2006	2008–2009

== Individual awards ==
- 2000 World League "Most Valuable Player"
- 2003 European Championship "Most Valuable Player"
- 2003 European Championship "Best Server"
- 2003 FIVB World Cup "Best Server"
- 2004 Summer Olympics "Best Server"
- 2004 Summer Olympics "Best Scorer"
- 2004 World League "Most Valuable Player"

=== State awards ===
- 2000 Knight's Order of Merit of the Italian Republic
- 2004 Officer's Order of Merit of the Italian Republic

Awards
Preceded by (Federal Republic of Yugoslavia) Ivan Miljković	Most Valuable Player of European Championship; 2003	Succeeded by (Italy) Alberto Cisolla
