= Paolo Cozzi =

Italian volleyball player (born 1980)

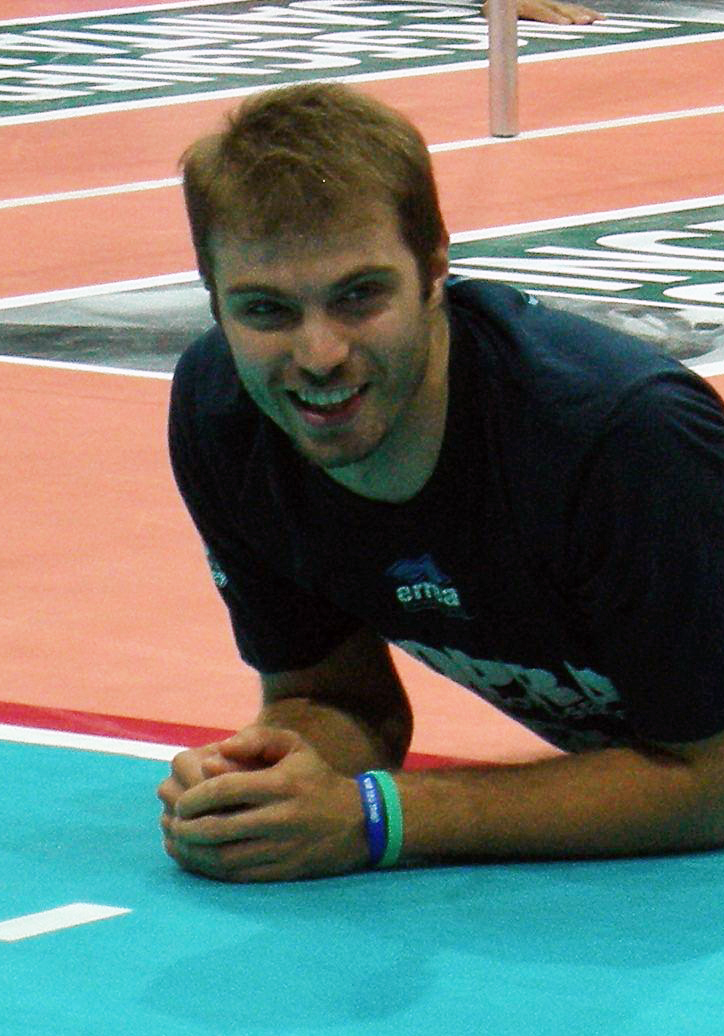

Medal record

Men's volleyball

Representing Italy

Olympic Games
Silver medal – second place	2004 Athens	Team competition

World Cup
Silver medal – second place	2003 Japan	Team competition

European Championship
Gold medal – first place	2005 Serbia/Italy	Team competition

U19 World Championship
Gold medal – first place	1997 Iran	Team competition

Paolo Cozzi (born 26 May 1980 in Milan) is a volleyball player from Italy, who won the silver medal with the Italian men's national team at the 2004 Summer Olympics in Athens, Greece.

== State awards ==
- 2004 Officer's Order of Merit of the Italian Republic
