= Dominique Daquin =

French volleyball player (born 1972)

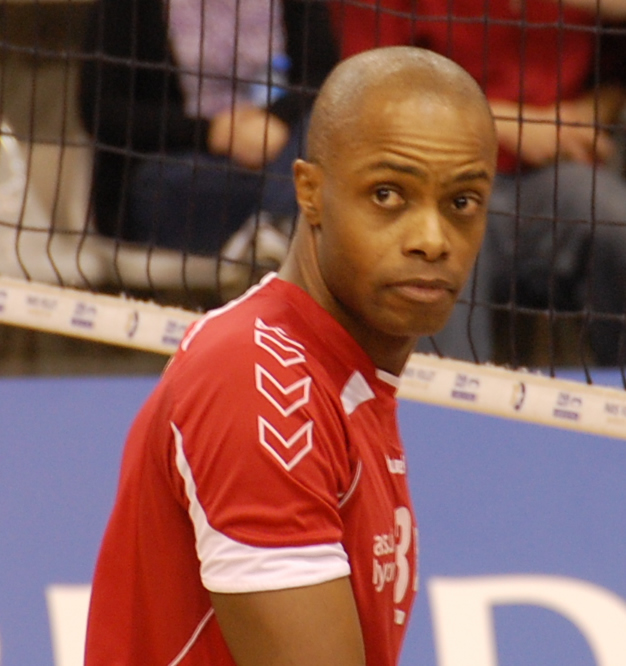

Personal information
- Nationality: French
- Born: 10 November 1972 (age 53); Le Robert, France
- Height: 1.98 m (6 ft 6 in)
- Weight: 85 kg (187 lb)
- Spike: 352 cm (139 in)
- Block: 325 cm (128 in)

Volleyball information
- Position: Middle blocker

Career
Years	Teams
1992–1993; 1993–1998; 1998–2000; 2000–2001; 2001–2003; 2003–2005; 2005–2008; 2008–2009; 2009–2012	ASUL Lyon VB; AS Cannes VB; Stade Poitevin Poitiers; Palerme Volley; Icom Latina; Dinamo Moscow; Montpellier UC; Marseille Volley 13; ASUL Lyon VB

National team
1994–2006	France
Honours
Men's volleyball
Representing France
World Championship
Bronze medal – third place	2002 Argentina
European Championships
Silver medal – second place	2003 Germany
- Last updated: 2 January 2018

Dominique Daquin (born 10 November 1972 in Martinique) is a French volleyball player, who won the bronze medal with the France men's national volleyball team at the 2002 World Championship. Standing at 1.97 m, he plays as a middle-blocker.

== Individual awards ==
- 2001 European Championship "Best Blocker"
