= Nobuharu Saito =

Japanese volleyball player (born 1973)

Personal information
- Nationality: Japanese
- Born: 29 September 1973 (age 52) Imaichi, Japan

Sport
- Sport: Volleyball

Nobuharu Saito (齋藤 信治, Saitō Nobuharu; born 29 September 1973) is a Japanese volleyball player. He competed in the men's tournament at the 2008 Summer Olympics.
