= 2003 Men's European Volleyball Championship =

Tournament details
- Host country: Germany
- Dates: September 5–14
- Teams: 12
- Venue: 1 (in 1 host city)

Final positions
- Champions: Italy (5th title)

Tournament awards
- MVP: (Italy) Andrea Sartoretti

The 2003 Men's European Volleyball Championship was the 23rd edition of the event, organized by Europe's governing volleyball body, the Confédération Européenne de Volleyball. It was hosted in Berlin, Germany from September 5 to September 14, 2003.

== Qualification ==
The first five from the 2001 edition of the Men's European Volleyball Championship — Serbia & Montenegro, Italy, Czech Republic, Russia, and Poland — plus hosts Germany were automatically qualified. The four group winners qualified, and the two best numbers two.

== Teams ==
Group A

- Bulgaria
- Greece
- Netherlands
- Poland
- Russia
- Serbia and Montenegro

Group B

- Czech Republic
- France
- Germany
- Italy
- Spain
- Slovakia

== Preliminary round ==
=== Group A ===
	Team	Points	G	W	L	PW	PL	Ratio	SW	SL	Ratio
1.	Serbia and Montenegro	9	5	4	1	454	299	1.138	14	5	2.800
2.	Russia	8	5	3	2	439	366	1.199	10	9	1.111
3.	Netherlands	8	5	3	2	463	449	1.031	10	10	1.000
4.	Poland	7	5	2	3	485	479	1.013	11	11	1.000
5.	Bulgaria	7	5	2	3	320	416	0.769	7	11	0.636
6.	Greece	6	5	1	4	402	454	0.885	7	13	0.538

=== Group B ===
	Team	Points	G	W	L	PW	PL	Ratio	SW	SL	Ratio
1.	Italy	10	5	5	0	415	329	1.261	15	2	7.500
2.	France	9	5	4	1	418	364	1.148	13	4	3.250
3.	Germany	8	5	3	2	417	398	1.048	10	8	1.250
4.	Spain	7	5	2	3	403	428	0.942	7	11	0.636
5.	Czech Republic	6	5	1	4	399	440	0.907	5	13	0.385
6.	Slovakia	5	5	0	5	354	447	0.792	3	15	0.200

== Final round ==
Semi-finals
2003-09-13 – Berlin
Italy	3
Russia	0
2003-09-13 – Berlin
Serbia and Montenegro	2
France	3

Final
2003-09-14 – Berlin
Italy	3
France	2
3rd place
2003-09-14 – Berlin
Russia	3
Serbia and Montenegro	1

5-8th place
2003-09-13 – Berlin
Netherlands	3
Spain	2
2003-09-13 – Berlin
Poland	3
Germany	1

5th place
2003-09-14 – Berlin
Poland	3
Netherlands	0
7th place
2003-09-14 – Berlin
Spain	1
Germany	3

== Final ranking ==
Place	Team
1.	Italy
2.	France
3.	Russia
4.	Serbia and Montenegro
5.	Poland
6.	Netherlands
7.	Germany
8.	Spain
9.	Bulgaria
10.	Czech Republic
11.	Greece
12.	Slovakia

2003 Men's European champions

Italy
Fifth title

Team Roster
Francesco Biribanti, Matej Černič, Paolo Cozzi, Alessandro Fei, Andrea Giani, Luigi Mastrangelo, Marco Meoni, Samuele Papi, Damiano Pippi, Andrea Sartoretti, Cristian Savani, and Valerio Vermiglio.
Head coach: Gian Paolo Montali.

== Awards ==
- Most valuable player
  Andrea Sartoretti (ITA)
- Best scorer
  Richard Schuil (NED)
- Best spiker
  Piotr Gruszka (POL)
- Best blocker
  Luigi Mastrangelo (ITA)
- Best server
  Andrea Sartoretti (ITA)
- Best receiver
  Samuele Papi (ITA)
- Best setter
  Nikola Grbić (SCG)
- Best digger
  Hubert Henno (FRA)
