= 2003 FIVB Volleyball Men's World Cup =

International volleyball competition

2003 Men's World Cup
Tournament details
- Host country: Japan
- Dates: 16–30 November
- Teams: 12 (from 5 confederations)
- Venues: 7 (in 6 host cities)

Final positions
- Champions: Brazil (1st title)
- Runners-up: Italy
- Third place: Serbia and Montenegro
- Fourth place: United States

Tournament awards
- MVP: (Japan) Takahiro Yamamoto

The 2003 FIVB Men's World Cup was held from 16 to 29 November 2003 in Japan. Twelve men's national teams played in cities all over Japan for the right to a fast lane ticket into the 2004 Summer Olympics in Athens, Greece.

Teams were made up as follows: hosts Japan, continental champions and vice-champions from Europe, Asia, NORCECA and South America, continental champion from Africa plus two wild-card teams nominated jointly by FIVB and the Japan Volleyball Association. Teams played a single-round robin format (66 games overall), in two parallel groups (site A and site B). The men played in Tokyo, Hiroshima, Fukuoka, Nagano, Hamamatsu, and Okayama.

== Qualification ==
Means of qualification	Date	Host	Vacancies	Qualified
Host country	—	―	1	Japan
2003 Men's European Volleyball Championship	5–14 September 2003	Germany	2	Italy
2003 Men's European Volleyball Championship	5–14 September 2003	Germany	2	France
2003 Men's NORCECA Volleyball Championship	25–30 September 2003	(Mexico) Culiacán	2	United States
2003 Men's NORCECA Volleyball Championship	25–30 September 2003	(Mexico) Culiacán	2	Canada
2003 Men's South American Volleyball Championship	2–6 September 2003	(Brazil) Rio de Janeiro	2	Brazil
2003 Men's South American Volleyball Championship	2–6 September 2003	(Brazil) Rio de Janeiro	2	Venezuela
2003 Asian Men's Volleyball Championship	5–12 September 2003	(China) Tianjin	2	South Korea
2003 Asian Men's Volleyball Championship	5–12 September 2003	(China) Tianjin	2	China
2003 Men's African Volleyball Championship	1–6 August 2003	(Egypt) Cairo	1	Tunisia
Wild Cards	―	―	2	Serbia and Montenegro
Wild Cards	―	―	2	Egypt
Total			12	

== Results ==
Pos	Team	Pld	W	L	Pts	SW	SL	SR	SPW	SPL	SPR
1	Brazil	11	11	0	22	33	4	8.250	916	720	1.272
2	Italy	11	9	2	20	29	8	3.625	910	762	1.194
3	Serbia and Montenegro	11	9	2	20	29	10	2.900	951	842	1.129
4	United States	11	8	3	19	24	13	1.846	883	794	1.112
5	France	11	7	4	18	24	16	1.500	950	868	1.094
6	South Korea	11	5	6	16	20	20	1.000	909	915	0.993
7	Canada	11	5	6	16	18	23	0.783	883	954	0.926
8	Venezuela	11	4	7	15	14	23	0.609	832	893	0.932
9	Japan	11	3	8	14	14	27	0.519	879	948	0.927
10	China	11	2	9	13	13	28	0.464	898	1012	0.887
11	Tunisia	11	2	9	13	9	30	0.300	803	932	0.862
12	Egypt	11	1	10	12	7	32	0.219	787	961	0.819

=== First round ===
==== Site A ====
Venue: Yoyogi National Gymnasium, Tokyo

Date		Score		Set 1	Set 2	Set 3	Set 4	Set 5	Total
16 Nov	China	0–3	Serbia and Montenegro	16–25	16–25	24–26			56–76
16 Nov	Canada	0–3	United States	17–25	17–25	17–25			51–75
16 Nov	Japan	3–0	Egypt	25–20	25–17	25–23			75–60
17 Nov	Egypt	0–3	Canada	22–25	16–25	20–25			58–75
17 Nov	Serbia and Montenegro	3–0	United States	26–24	25–21	25–22			76–67
17 Nov	Japan	3–1	China	23–25	25–21	25–18	25–20		98–84
18 Nov	United States	3–1	China	23–25	25–20	25–20	25–19		98–84
18 Nov	Serbia and Montenegro	3–1	Egypt	28–30	25–18	25–21	25–12		103–81
18 Nov	Japan	3–2	Canada	25–21	25–16	25–27	20–25	15–13	110-102

==== Site B ====
Venue: White Ring, Nagano

Date		Score		Set 1	Set 2	Set 3	Set 4	Set 5	Total
16 Nov	Italy	3–0	Tunisia	25–16	25–13	25–23			75–52
16 Nov	France	3–0	Venezuela	25–23	25–21	25–21			75–65
16 Nov	South Korea	0–3	Brazil	21–25	19–25	17–25			57–75
17 Nov	Tunisia	0–3	South Korea	19–25	20–25	26–28			65–78
17 Nov	Venezuela	0–3	Italy	21–25	15–25	15–25			51–75
17 Nov	Brazil	3–1	France	24–26	25–21	25–20	25–22		99–89
18 Nov	Brazil	3–0	Venezuela	25–19	25–16	25–20			75–55
18 Nov	France	3–2	Tunisia	23–25	23–25	25–18	25–21	18–16	114–105
18 Nov	Italy	3–1	South Korea	25–18	21–25	25–18	25–21		96–82

=== Second round ===
==== Site A ====
Venue: Hiroshima Green Arena, Hiroshima

Date		Score		Set 1	Set 2	Set 3	Set 4	Set 5	Total
20 Nov	Serbia and Montenegro	3–1	Canada	25–14	23–25	25–20	26–24		99–83
20 Nov	Egypt	0–3	China	22–25	20–25	29–31			71–81
20 Nov	United States	3–1	Japan	19–25	25–14	25–23	25–19		94–81
21 Nov	United States	3–1	Egypt	25–22	25–19	22–25	25–14		97–80
21 Nov	Canada	3-2	China	25–23	24–26	34–36	25–22	15–13	123–120
21 Nov	Japan	1–3	Serbia and Montenegro	25–21	18–25	22–25	20–25		85–96

==== Site B ====
Venue: Hamamatsu Arena, Hamamatsu

Date		Score		Set 1	Set 2	Set 3	Set 4	Set 5	Total
20 Nov	South Korea	3–1	France	20–25	25–23	25–23	25–21		95–92
20 Nov	Venezuela	3-0	Tunisia	25–23	25–21	25–22			75–66
20 Nov	Brazil	3–1	Italy	25–18	26–24	20–25	25–22		96–89
21 Nov	Italy	3–0	France	25–22	26–24	25–20			76–66
21 Nov	South Korea	3–1	Venezuela	25–21	25–22	23–25	26–24		99–92
21 Nov	Brazil	3–0	Tunisia	25–17	25–16	25–11			75–44

=== Third round ===
==== Site A ====
Venue: Marine Messe, Fukuoka

Date		Score		Set 1	Set 2	Set 3	Set 4	Set 5	Total
23 Nov	United States	3–0	Tunisia	25–13	25–17	25–22			75–52
23 Nov	Serbia and Montenegro	3–0	South Korea	27–25	25–20	26–24			78–69
23 Nov	Japan	0–3	Venezuela	20–25	18–25	23–25			61–75
24 Nov	United States	3–0	South Korea	25–20	25–20	25–17			75–57
24 Nov	Serbia and Montenegro	3–0	Venezuela	25–23	25–22	25–18			75–63
24 Nov	Japan	2–3	Tunisia	25–23	25–22	22–25	21–25	10–15	103-110
25 Nov	Serbia and Montenegro	3–0	Tunisia	25–16	25–14	25–21			75–51
25 Nov	United States	3–0	Venezuela	28–26	25–16	25–13			78–65
25 Nov	Japan	0–3	South Korea	22–25	13–25	23–25			58–75

==== Site B ====
Venue: Okayama General and Cultural Gymnasium, Okayama

Date		Score		Set 1	Set 2	Set 3	Set 4	Set 5	Total
23 Nov	Italy	3–0	Canada	25–22	25–19	25–20			75–61
23 Nov	Brazil	3–1	China	25–21	25–20	23–25	25–18		98–84
23 Nov	France	3–0	Egypt	25–15	25–23	25–15			75–53
24 Nov	Brazil	3–0	Canada	25–13	25–17	25–14			75–44
24 Nov	Italy	3–0	Egypt	25–16	25–16	25–17			75–49
24 Nov	France	3–1	China	25–16	25–14	24–26	25–19		99–75
25 Nov	Italy	3–0	China	25–15	25–15	25–20			75–50
25 Nov	Brazil	3–0	Egypt	25–20	25–20	25–13			75–53
25 Nov	France	3–0	Canada	25–19	25–20	25–16			75–55

=== Fourth round ===
==== Site A ====
Venue: Yoyogi National Gymnasium, Tokyo

Date		Score		Set 1	Set 2	Set 3	Set 4	Set 5	Total
28 Nov	Italy	3-0	United States	25-12	29–27	25–22			79-61
28 Nov	Serbia and Montenegro	1–3	Brazil	25–23	21–25	21–25	21–25		88–98
28 Nov	Japan	0–3	France	23–25	18–25	21–25			62–75
29 Nov	Brazil	3-0	United States	25–20	25–21	25–23			75-64
29 Nov	Serbia and Montenegro	1–3	France	18–25	22–25	25–21	19–25		84–96
29 Nov	Japan	1–3	Italy	21–25	25–27	27–25	20–25		93–102
30 Nov	Serbia and Montenegro	3–1	Italy	25–18	21–25	30–28	25–22		101–93
30 Nov	United States	3–1	France	25–19	20–25	26–24	28–26		99–94
30 Nov	Japan	0–3	Brazil	17–25	20–25	16–25			53–75

==== Site B ====
Venue: Tokyo Metropolitan Gymnasium, Tokyo

Date		Score		Set 1	Set 2	Set 3	Set 4	Set 5	Total
28 Nov	Venezuela	3–1	China	23–25	25–22	28–26	25–20		101–93
28 Nov	Tunisia	0–3	Canada	23–25	20–25	20–25			63–75
28 Nov	Egypt	3–2	South Korea	25–20	21–25	18–25	25–23	15–11	104–104
29 Nov	Venezuela	1–3	Canada	21–25	25–23	20–25	21–25		87–98
29 Nov	Tunisia	3–1	Egypt	25–20	25–19	23–25	25–16		98–80
29 Nov	South Korea	3–0	China	25–19	25–21	26–24			76–64
30 Nov	Venezuela	3–1	Egypt	31–29	25–23	22–25	25–21		103–98
30 Nov	Tunisia	1–3	China	17–25	26–24	25–27	29–31		97–107
30 Nov	Canada	3–2	South Korea	28–30	26–24	20–25	27–25	15–13	116–117

== Final standing ==
Rank	Team
1st place, gold medalist(s)	Brazil
2nd place, silver medalist(s)	Italy
3rd place, bronze medalist(s)	Serbia and Montenegro
4	United States
5	France
6	South Korea
7	Canada
8	Venezuela
9	Japan
10	China
11	Tunisia
12	Egypt

Qualified for the 2004 Summer Olympics

2003 Men's World Cup champions

Brazil
1st title

Team roster
Giovane, André Heller, Maurício, Giba, André, Sérgio, Anderson, Nalbert (c), Gustavo, Rodrigão, Ricardo, Dante
Head coach
Bernardinho

== Awards ==
- Most valuable player
  (Japan) Takahiro Yamamoto
- Best scorer
  (Japan) Takahiro Yamamoto
- Best spiker
  (Brazil) Giovane Gávio
- Best blocker
  (Serbia and Montenegro) Andrija Gerić
- Best server
  (Italy) Andrea Sartoretti
- Best setter
  (Serbia and Montenegro) Nikola Grbić
- Best libero
  (Brazil) Sérgio Santos
- Most spectacular player
  (Japan) Daisuke Usami
