= 2000 FIVB Volleyball World League =

11th edition of annual men's global volleyball contest

2000 World League
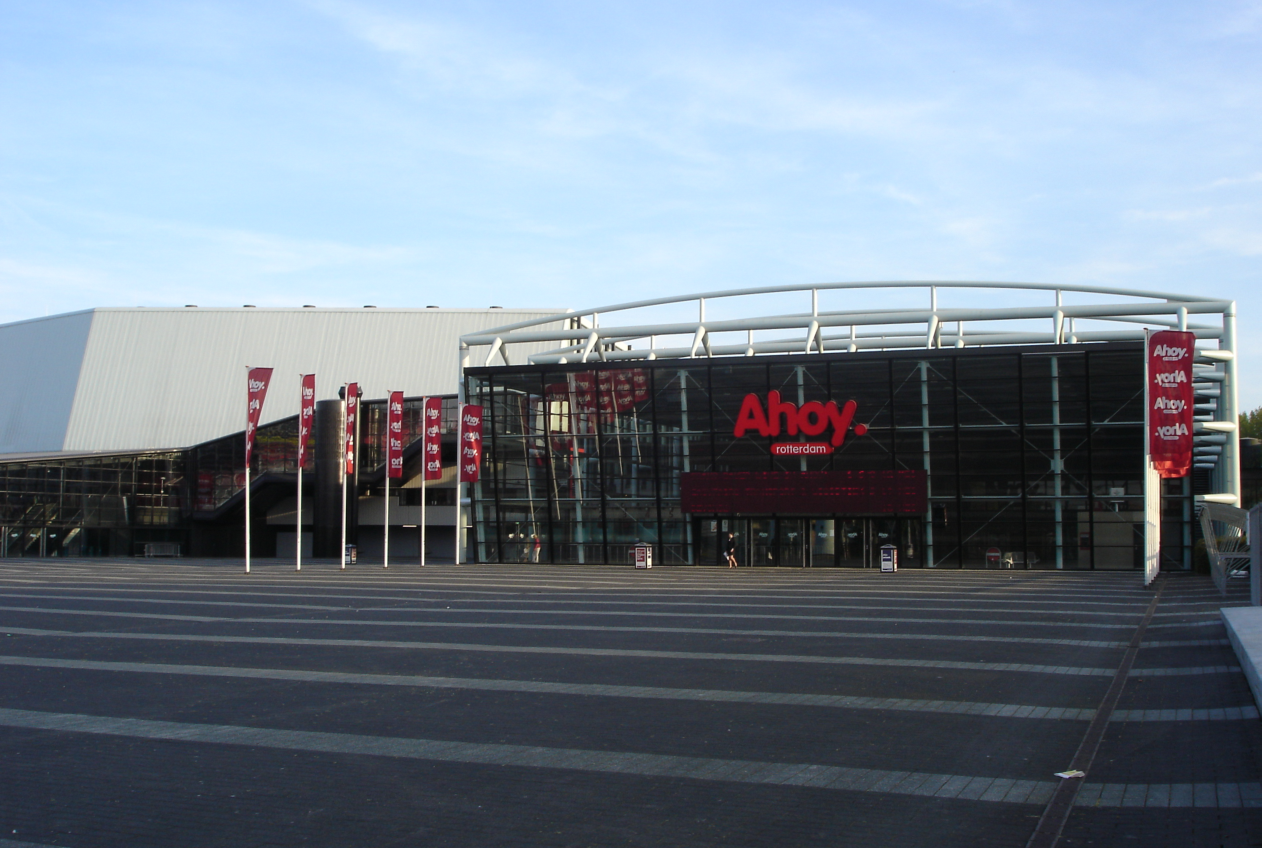
- Ahoy Rotterdam Host Final

Tournament details
- Host country: Netherlands (Final)
- Dates: 26 May – 16 July
- Teams: 12

Final positions
- Champions: Italy (8th title)

Tournament awards
- MVP: (Italy) Andrea Sartoretti

The 2000 FIVB Volleyball World League was the 11th edition of the annual men's international volleyball tournament, played by 12 countries from 26 May to 16 July 2000. The Final Round was held in Rotterdam, Netherlands.

== Pools composition ==
| Pool A | Pool B | Pool C |
|---|---|---|
| Argentina; Canada; Italy; Yugoslavia | Cuba; France; Netherlands; Russia | Brazil; Poland; Spain; United States |

== Intercontinental round ==
=== Pool A ===
| Pos | Team | Pld | W | L | Pts | SW | SL | SR | SPW | SPL | SPR | Qualification |
|---|---|---|---|---|---|---|---|---|---|---|---|---|
| 1 | Yugoslavia | 12 | 9 | 3 | 21 | 32 | 15 | 2.133 | 1116 | 1013 | 1.102 | Final round |
| 2 | Italy | 12 | 8 | 4 | 20 | 28 | 23 | 1.217 | 1160 | 1131 | 1.026 | Final round |
| 3 | Argentina | 12 | 4 | 8 | 16 | 23 | 28 | 0.821 | 1136 | 1151 | 0.987 | |
| 4 | Canada | 12 | 3 | 9 | 15 | 15 | 32 | 0.469 | 1010 | 1127 | 0.896 | |

| Date | | Score | | Set 1 | Set 2 | Set 3 | Set 4 | Set 5 | Total |
|---|---|---|---|---|---|---|---|---|---|
| 26 May | Italy | 1–3 | Yugoslavia | 25–20 | 19–25 | 14–25 | 21–25 | | 79–95 |
| 26 May | Canada | 3–2 | Argentina | 22–25 | 25–18 | 25–22 | 25–27 | 15–13 | 112–105 |
| 27 May | Canada | 3–2 | Argentina | 15–25 | 27–25 | 25–16 | 18–25 | 16–14 | 101–105 |
| 28 May | Italy | 3–2 | Yugoslavia | 20–25 | 25–27 | 25–23 | 25–17 | 15–9 | 110–101 |
| 2 Jun | Argentina | 3–1 | Italy | 24–26 | 31–29 | 25–21 | 25–23 | | 105–99 |
| 2 Jun | Canada | 3–1 | Yugoslavia | 25–18 | 17–25 | 25–23 | 25–20 | | 92–86 |
| 3 Jun | Argentina | 1–3 | Italy | 25–23 | 23–25 | 20–25 | 17–25 | | 85–98 |
| 3 Jun | Canada | 0–3 | Yugoslavia | 22–25 | 21–25 | 23–25 | | | 66–75 |
| 9 Jun | Canada | 1–3 | Italy | 25–27 | 19–25 | 25–23 | 15–25 | | 84–100 |
| 10 Jun | Argentina | 3–2 | Yugoslavia | 31–33 | 28–30 | 26–24 | 25–19 | 15–12 | 125–118 |
| 10 Jun | Canada | 1–3 | Italy | 21–25 | 20–25 | 25–21 | 25–27 | | 91–98 |
| 11 Jun | Argentina | 1–3 | Yugoslavia | 15–25 | 25–13 | 24–26 | 23–25 | | 87–89 |
| 16 Jun | Italy | 3–2 | Argentina | 25–19 | 22–25 | 25–18 | 20–25 | 16–14 | 108–101 |
| 17 Jun | Yugoslavia | 3–0 | Canada | 25–16 | 25–14 | 25–19 | | | 75–49 |
| 18 Jun | Yugoslavia | 3–1 | Canada | 26–24 | 21–25 | 38–36 | 25–16 | | 110–101 |
| 18 Jun | Italy | 3–2 | Argentina | 25–22 | 25–19 | 23–25 | 22–25 | 15–13 | 110–104 |
| 23 Jun | Yugoslavia | 3–0 | Argentina | 25–23 | 25–15 | 25–23 | | | 75–61 |
| 23 Jun | Italy | 3–1 | Canada | 25–17 | 26–24 | 21–25 | 25–23 | | 97–89 |
| 24 Jun | Yugoslavia | 3–1 | Argentina | 25–21 | 19–25 | 25–13 | 25–21 | | 94–80 |
| 25 Jun | Italy | 3–1 | Canada | 23–25 | 25–16 | 25–16 | 25–21 | | 98–78 |
| 30 Jun | Yugoslavia | 3–1 | Italy | 25–23 | 25–20 | 25–27 | 25–18 | | 100–88 |
| 30 Jun | Argentina | 3–0 | Canada | 25–22 | 25–12 | 25–22 | | | 75–56 |
| 1 Jul | Yugoslavia | 3–1 | Italy | 23–25 | 25–18 | 25–20 | 25–12 | | 98–75 |
| 1 Jul | Argentina | 3–1 | Canada | 28–26 | 25–16 | 25–27 | 25–22 | | 103–91 |

=== Pool B ===
| Pos | Team | Pld | W | L | Pts | SW | SL | SR | SPW | SPL | SPR | Qualification |
|---|---|---|---|---|---|---|---|---|---|---|---|---|
| 1 | Russia | 12 | 9 | 3 | 21 | 31 | 14 | 2.214 | 1073 | 987 | 1.087 | Final round |
| 2 | France | 12 | 7 | 5 | 19 | 24 | 21 | 1.143 | 1027 | 1040 | 0.988 | |
| 3 | Cuba | 12 | 5 | 7 | 17 | 21 | 24 | 0.875 | 1074 | 1063 | 1.010 | |
| 4 | Netherlands (Note: Qualified as hosts) (H) | 12 | 3 | 9 | 15 | 13 | 30 | 0.433 | 944 | 1028 | 0.918 | Final round |

(H) Host
Notes:

| Date | | Score | | Set 1 | Set 2 | Set 3 | Set 4 | Set 5 | Total |
|---|---|---|---|---|---|---|---|---|---|
| 27 May | France | 3–1 | Cuba | 25–21 | 41–43 | 25–23 | 25–22 | | 116–109 |
| 27 May | Netherlands | 1–3 | Russia | 23–25 | 21–25 | 25–20 | 22–25 | | 91–95 |
| 28 May | France | 3–2 | Cuba | 25–18 | 23–25 | 25–22 | 11–25 | 16–14 | 100–104 |
| 28 May | Netherlands | 1–3 | Russia | 25–19 | 19–25 | 16–25 | 22–25 | | 82–94 |
| 2 Jun | France | 3–1 | Russia | 25–21 | 25–21 | 21–25 | 25–22 | | 96–89 |
| 3 Jun | Netherlands | 1–3 | Cuba | 13–25 | 25–27 | 29–27 | 25–27 | | 92–106 |
| 3 Jun | France | 3–1 | Russia | 25–22 | 25–22 | 20–25 | 25–23 | | 95–92 |
| 4 Jun | Netherlands | 1–3 | Cuba | 26–24 | 18–25 | 21–25 | 22–25 | | 87–99 |
| 9 Jun | Russia | 3–0 | Netherlands | 26–24 | 25–20 | 25–22 | | | 76–66 |
| 9 Jun | Cuba | 3–1 | France | 21–25 | 25–21 | 25–19 | 25–22 | | 96–87 |
| 10 Jun | Russia | 2–3 | Netherlands | 25–19 | 19–25 | 26–24 | 22–25 | 11–15 | 103–108 |
| 10 Jun | Cuba | 1–3 | France | 27–25 | 23–25 | 21–25 | 18–25 | | 89–100 |
| 16 Jun | Cuba | 0–3 | Russia | 23–25 | 22–25 | 19–25 | | | 64–75 |
| 17 Jun | Netherlands | 3–1 | France | 25–16 | 25–22 | 19–25 | 25–22 | | 94–85 |
| 17 Jun | Cuba | 1–3 | Russia | 25–23 | 22–25 | 17–25 | 25–27 | | 89–100 |
| 18 Jun | Netherlands | 3–0 | France | 25–22 | 25–20 | 25–22 | | | 75–64 |
| 23 Jun | Russia | 3–1 | France | 25–20 | 25–18 | 22–25 | 25–16 | | 97–79 |
| 23 Jun | Cuba | 3–0 | Netherlands | 25–22 | 25–21 | 25–19 | | | 75–62 |
| 24 Jun | Russia | 3–0 | France | 25–21 | 25–17 | 25–17 | | | 75–55 |
| 24 Jun | Cuba | 3–0 | Netherlands | 25–18 | 25–20 | 31–29 | | | 81–67 |
| 30 Jun | Russia | 3–0 | Cuba | 25–21 | 25–22 | 25–19 | | | 75–62 |
| 30 Jun | France | 3–0 | Netherlands | 25–19 | 25–20 | 25–22 | | | 75–61 |
| 1 Jul | Russia | 3–1 | Cuba | 31–29 | 25–22 | 20–25 | 26–24 | | 102–100 |
| 1 Jul | France | 3–0 | Netherlands | 25–22 | 25–16 | 25–21 | | | 75–59 |

=== Pool C ===
| Pos | Team | Pld | W | L | Pts | SW | SL | SR | SPW | SPL | SPR | Qualification |
|---|---|---|---|---|---|---|---|---|---|---|---|---|
| 1 | United States | 12 | 10 | 2 | 22 | 31 | 15 | 2.067 | 1104 | 999 | 1.105 | Final round |
| 2 | Brazil | 12 | 8 | 4 | 20 | 28 | 16 | 1.750 | 1050 | 967 | 1.086 | Final round |
| 3 | Poland | 12 | 5 | 7 | 17 | 21 | 24 | 0.875 | 1018 | 1038 | 0.981 | |
| 4 | Spain | 12 | 1 | 11 | 13 | 9 | 34 | 0.265 | 871 | 1039 | 0.838 | |

| Date | | Score | | Set 1 | Set 2 | Set 3 | Set 4 | Set 5 | Total |
|---|---|---|---|---|---|---|---|---|---|
| 26 May | Spain | 0–3 | Poland | 19–25 | 19–25 | 16–25 | | | 54–75 |
| 27 May | Brazil | 1–3 | United States | 23–25 | 16–25 | 25–20 | 23–25 | | 87–95 |
| 28 May | Brazil | 1–3 | United States | 25–16 | 23–25 | 25–27 | 23–25 | | 96–93 |
| 28 May | Spain | 0–3 | Poland | 20–25 | 22–25 | 18–25 | | | 60–75 |
| 2 Jun | Poland | 1–3 | United States | 25–19 | 17–25 | 16–25 | 21–25 | | 79–94 |
| 2 Jun | Spain | 0–3 | Brazil | 22–25 | 21–25 | 21–25 | | | 64–75 |
| 3 Jun | Poland | 1–3 | United States | 27–25 | 18–25 | 20–25 | 21–25 | | 86–100 |
| 4 Jun | Spain | 0–3 | Brazil | 22–25 | 21–25 | 18–25 | | | 61–75 |
| 9 Jun | Poland | 3–1 | Brazil | 25–23 | 25–17 | 20–25 | 23–25 | | 93–90 |
| 9 Jun | Spain | 1–3 | United States | 31–29 | 19–25 | 21–25 | 27–29 | | 98–108 |
| 10 Jun | Poland | 0–3 | Brazil | 20–25 | 15–25 | 33–35 | | | 68–85 |
| 11 Jun | Spain | 0–3 | United States | 21–25 | 16–25 | 15–25 | | | 52–75 |
| 16 Jun | United States | 3–2 | Poland | 25–27 | 25–19 | 29–31 | 25–22 | 15–12 | 119–111 |
| 17 Jun | Brazil | 1–3 | Spain | 20–25 | 25–18 | 23–25 | 18–25 | | 86–93 |
| 17 Jun | United States | 3–1 | Poland | 25–19 | 25–27 | 25–23 | 25–19 | | 100–88 |
| 18 Jun | Brazil | 3–2 | Spain | 21–25 | 21–25 | 25–18 | 25–19 | 15–13 | 107–100 |
| 23 Jun | United States | 3–0 | Spain | 25–18 | 25–15 | 26–24 | | | 76–57 |
| 24 Jun | Brazil | 3–0 | Poland | 27–25 | 25–18 | 25–17 | | | 77–60 |
| 24 Jun | United States | 3–1 | Spain | 25–16 | 25–18 | 22–25 | 25–12 | | 97–71 |
| 25 Jun | Brazil | 3–1 | Poland | 26–24 | 25–22 | 22–25 | 25–22 | | 98–93 |
| 30 Jun | Poland | 3–2 | Spain | 29–27 | 25–16 | 24–26 | 22–25 | 15–7 | 115–101 |
| 30 Jun | United States | 0–3 | Brazil | 21–25 | 24–26 | 18–25 | | | 63–76 |
| 1 Jul | Poland | 3–0 | Spain | 25–22 | 25–19 | 25–19 | | | 75–60 |
| 1 Jul | United States | 1–3 | Brazil | 14–25 | 25–27 | 25–21 | 20–25 | | 84–98 |

== Final round ==
- Venue: Rotterdam Ahoy, Rotterdam, Netherlands

=== Pool play ===
| Pos | Team | Pld | W | L | Pts | SW | SL | SR | SPW | SPL | SPR | Qualification |
|---|---|---|---|---|---|---|---|---|---|---|---|---|
| 1 | Italy | 5 | 4 | 1 | 9 | 13 | 8 | 1.625 | 460 | 462 | 0.996 | Final |
| 2 | Russia | 5 | 3 | 2 | 8 | 13 | 7 | 1.857 | 454 | 413 | 1.099 | Final |
| 3 | Yugoslavia | 5 | 3 | 2 | 8 | 11 | 8 | 1.375 | 440 | 403 | 1.092 | 3rd place match |
| 4 | Brazil | 5 | 2 | 3 | 7 | 8 | 11 | 0.727 | 414 | 421 | 0.983 | 3rd place match |
| 5 | Netherlands | 5 | 2 | 3 | 7 | 7 | 12 | 0.583 | 409 | 435 | 0.940 | |
| 6 | United States | 5 | 1 | 4 | 6 | 8 | 14 | 0.571 | 472 | 515 | 0.917 | |

| Date | | Score | | Set 1 | Set 2 | Set 3 | Set 4 | Set 5 | Total |
|---|---|---|---|---|---|---|---|---|---|
| 10 Jul | Russia | 3–0 | Yugoslavia | 25–23 | 25–20 | 25–22 | | | 75–65 |
| 10 Jul | Italy | 3–1 | United States | 25–19 | 20–25 | 25–20 | 25–23 | | 95–87 |
| 10 Jul | Brazil | 3–0 | Netherlands | 25–21 | 25–23 | 25–21 | | | 75–65 |
| 11 Jul | Italy | 3–2 | Russia | 26–24 | 19–25 | 25–22 | 13–25 | 17–15 | 100–111 |
| 11 Jul | United States | 3–2 | Brazil | 22–25 | 19–25 | 25–23 | 25–23 | 15–11 | 106–107 |
| 11 Jul | Yugoslavia | 3–1 | Netherlands | 25–19 | 15–25 | 25–20 | 25–13 | | 90–77 |
| 12 Jul | Yugoslavia | 3–1 | United States | 25–15 | 19–25 | 36–34 | 25–14 | | 105–88 |
| 12 Jul | Italy | 3–0 | Brazil | 25–19 | 25–21 | 26–24 | | | 76–64 |
| 12 Jul | Russia | 3–0 | Netherlands | 25–16 | 25–17 | 26–24 | | | 76–57 |
| 14 Jul | Yugoslavia | 3–0 | Brazil | 25–21 | 30–28 | 25–16 | | | 80–65 |
| 14 Jul | Russia | 3–1 | United States | 25–22 | 23–25 | 25–20 | 25–21 | | 98–88 |
| 14 Jul | Netherlands | 3–1 | Italy | 25–23 | 25–27 | 25–19 | 25–22 | | 100–91 |
| 15 Jul | Italy | 3–2 | Yugoslavia | 16–25 | 25–15 | 17–25 | 25–23 | 15–12 | 98–100 |
| 15 Jul | Brazil | 3–2 | Russia | 25–22 | 20–25 | 25–11 | 18–25 | 15–11 | 103–94 |
| 15 Jul | Netherlands | 3–2 | United States | 25–19 | 19–25 | 25–18 | 26–28 | 15–13 | 110–103 |

=== Finals ===
==== 3rd place match ====
| Date | | Score | | Set 1 | Set 2 | Set 3 | Set 4 | Set 5 | Total |
|---|---|---|---|---|---|---|---|---|---|
| 16 Jul | Yugoslavia | 0–3 | Brazil | 19–25 | 21–25 | 21–25 | | | 61–75 |

==== Final ====
| Date | | Score | | Set 1 | Set 2 | Set 3 | Set 4 | Set 5 | Total |
|---|---|---|---|---|---|---|---|---|---|
| 16 Jul | Italy | 3–2 | Russia | 25–22 | 18–25 | 20–25 | 25–21 | 15–13 | 103–106 |

== Final standing ==
| Rank | Team |
|---|---|
| 1st place, gold medalist(s) | Italy |
| 2nd place, silver medalist(s) | Russia |
| 3rd place, bronze medalist(s) | Brazil |
| 4 | Yugoslavia |
| 5 | Netherlands |
| 6 | United States |
| 7 | France |
| 8 | Argentina |
| 8 | Cuba |
| 8 | Poland |
| 11 | Canada |
| 11 | Spain |

2000 World League champions

Italy
8th title

== Awards ==
- Most valuable player
  - (Italy) Andrea Sartoretti
- Best server
  - (Federal Republic of Yugoslavia) Goran Vujević
- Best spiker
  - (Netherlands) Guido Görtzen
- Best blocker
  - (Netherlands) Martin van der Horst
