= 2004 FIVB Volleyball World League =

International sport competition

2004 World League
Tournament details
- Host country: Italy (Final)
- Dates: 4 June – 18 July
- Teams: 12

Final positions
- Champions: Brazil (4th title)

Tournament awards
- MVP: (Italy) Andrea Sartoretti

The 2004 FIVB Volleyball World League was the 15th edition of the annual men's international volleyball tournament, played by 12 countries from 4 June to 18 July 2004. The Final Round was held in Rome, Italy.

== Pools composition ==
Pool A	Pool B	Pool C
Brazil; Greece; Spain; Portugal	France; Bulgaria; Japan; Poland	Italy; China; Serbia and Montenegro; Cuba

== Intercontinental round ==
- The Final Round hosts Italy, the winners of each pool and a wild card chosen by the FIVB will qualify for the Final Round. If Italy are ranked first in Pool C, the team ranked second of Pool C will qualify for the Final Round.

=== Pool A ===
Pos	Team	Pld	W	L	Pts	SW	SL	SR	SPW	SPL	SPR	Qualification
1	Brazil	12	12	0	24	36	6	6.000	1031	822	1.254	Final round
2	Greece	12	5	7	17	22	25	0.880	1030	1016	1.014	
3	Spain	12	4	8	16	19	26	0.731	953	1015	0.939	
4	Portugal	12	3	9	15	12	32	0.375	875	1036	0.845	

Date		Score		Set 1	Set 2	Set 3	Set 4	Set 5	Total	Report
4 Jun	Greece	0–3	Brazil	19–25	22–25	22–25			63–75	P2
5 Jun	Spain	3–0	Portugal	25–21	25–21	25–16			75–58	P2
6 Jun	Spain	1–3	Portugal	26–24	13–25	18–25	17–25		74–99	P2
6 Jun	Greece	2–3	Brazil	25–21	13–25	19–25	26–24	9–15	92–110	P2
11 Jun	Greece	3–0	Portugal	25–20	25–16	25–18			75–54	P2
12 Jun	Brazil	3–1	Spain	26–28	25–14	25–19	25–20		101–81	P2
13 Jun	Brazil	3–0	Spain	25–16	25–22	25–16			75–54	P2
13 Jun	Greece	3–1	Portugal	25–18	22–25	25–22	25–13		97–78	P2
18 Jun	Spain	1–3	Greece	26–24	15–25	17–25	16–25		74–99	P2
19 Jun	Brazil	3–0	Portugal	25–16	25–19	25–16			75–51	P2
20 Jun	Brazil	3–0	Portugal	25–17	25–16	25–20			75–53	P2
20 Jun	Spain	0–3	Greece	23–25	20–25	26–28			69–78	P2
26 Jun	Brazil	3–0	Greece	25–20	25–22	25–21			75–63	P2
26 Jun	Portugal	1–3	Spain	25–21	20–25	19–25	11–25		75–96	P2
27 Jun	Brazil	3–0	Greece	25–21	25–19	25–22			75–62	P2
27 Jun	Portugal	0–3	Spain	15–25	21–25	17–25			53–75	P2
2 Jul	Spain	2–3	Brazil	20–25	21–25	25–23	36–34	4–15	106–122	P2
3 Jul	Portugal	3–2	Greece	23–25	22–25	25–23	28–26	15–13	113–112	P2
4 Jul	Spain	0–3	Brazil	15–25	23–25	19–25			57–75	P2
4 Jul	Portugal	3–2	Greece	18–25	17–25	26–24	25–22	15–13	101–109	P2
9 Jul	Greece	3–2	Spain	21–25	25–20	16–25	25–14	15–13	102–97	P2
10 Jul	Portugal	0–3	Brazil	19–25	20–25	23–25			62–75	P2
11 Jul	Portugal	1–3	Brazil	25–23	19–25	19–25	15–25		78–98	P2
11 Jul	Greece	1–3	Spain	23–25	25–20	13–25	17–25		78–95	P2

=== Pool B ===
Pos	Team	Pld	W	L	Pts	SW	SL	SR	SPW	SPL	SPR	Qualification
1	Bulgaria	12	9	3	21	31	13	2.385	1042	950	1.097	Final round
2	France	12	9	3	21	29	17	1.706	1072	992	1.081	
3	Poland	12	6	6	18	22	24	0.917	1063	1055	1.008	
4	Japan	12	0	12	12	8	36	0.222	907	1087	0.834	

Date		Score		Set 1	Set 2	Set 3	Set 4	Set 5	Total	Report
4 Jun	Bulgaria	2–3	France	25–20	17–25	22–25	29–27	13–15	106–112	P2
5 Jun	Japan	1–3	Poland	25–22	27–29	16–25	22–25		90–101	P2
6 Jun	Japan	2–3	Poland	21–25	30–28	32–34	25–23	7–15	115–125	P2
6 Jun	Bulgaria	3–0	France	25–21	25–23	25–22			75–66	P2
11 Jun	Poland	3–1	Bulgaria	25–22	25–15	21–25	25–23		96–85	P2
11 Jun	France	3–0	Japan	25–19	25–19	25–16			75–54	P2
12 Jun	Poland	1–3	Bulgaria	22–25	25–22	22–25	20–25		89–97	P2
12 Jun	France	3–0	Japan	25–19	25–18	25–18			75–55	P2
18 Jun	Poland	3–0	Japan	29–27	25–19	25–20			79–66	P2
18 Jun	France	0–3	Bulgaria	22–25	18–25	18–25			58–75	P2
19 Jun	Poland	3–0	Japan	25–13	30–28	25–21			80–62	P2
19 Jun	France	3–1	Bulgaria	24–26	30–28	25–20	25–20		104–94	P2
25 Jun	France	3–2	Poland	25–22	26–24	22–25	22–25	17–15	112–111	P2
26 Jun	Japan	1–3	Bulgaria	27–29	21–25	25–23	23–25		96–102	P2
26 Jun	France	2–3	Poland	20–25	25–23	23–25	25–18	8–15	101–106	P2
27 Jun	Japan	2–3	Bulgaria	15–25	18–25	25–21	25–22	10–15	93–108	P2
2 Jul	Bulgaria	3–0	Poland	25–23	25–20	25–15			75–58	P2
3 Jul	Japan	0–3	France	13–25	23–25	20–25			56–75	P2
3 Jul	Bulgaria	3–0	Poland	25–23	25–15	25–22			75–60	P2
4 Jul	Japan	2–3	France	27–25	19–25	16–25	29–27	11–15	102–117	P2
9 Jul	Poland	1–3	France	25–22	25–27	22–25	25–27		97–101	P2
10 Jul	Poland	0–3	France	17–25	24–26	20–25			61–76	P2
10 Jul	Bulgaria	3–0	Japan	25–22	25–17	25–19			75–58	P2
11 Jul	Bulgaria	3–0	Japan	25–22	25–19	25–19			75–60	P2

=== Pool C ===
Pos	Team	Pld	W	L	Pts	SW	SL	SR	SPW	SPL	SPR	Qualification
1	Serbia and Montenegro	12	10	2	22	34	14	2.429	1133	1010	1.122	Final round
2	Italy (Note: Qualified as hosts) (H)	12	7	5	19	27	19	1.421	1036	1000	1.036	Final round
3	Cuba	12	4	8	16	18	29	0.621	1017	1078	0.943	
4	China	12	3	9	15	14	31	0.452	968	1066	0.908	

(H) Host
Notes:

Date		Score		Set 1	Set 2	Set 3	Set 4	Set 5	Total	Report
4 Jun	Italy	3–0	China	25–17	25–22	25–20			75–59	P2
4 Jun	Cuba	1–3	Serbia and Montenegro	21–25	17–25	25–23	29–31		92–104	P2
5 Jun	Cuba	3–2	Serbia and Montenegro	25–20	23–25	25–21	15–25	18–16	106–107	P2
6 Jun	Italy	3–1	China	25–19	26–28	25–22	25–20		101–89	P2
11 Jun	Serbia and Montenegro	2–3	China	26–28	25–20	22–25	25–19	14–16	112–108	P2
11 Jun	Italy	2–3	Cuba	27–29	25–23	25–23	19–25	13–15	109–115	P2
12 Jun	Serbia and Montenegro	3–0	China	25–17	25–20	25–19			75–56	P2
13 Jun	Italy	3–0	Cuba	25–19	25–23	25–14			75–56	P2
18 Jun	Serbia and Montenegro	3–1	Cuba	25–17	25–22	15–25	25–15		90–79	P2
18 Jun	China	1–3	Italy	25–12	21–25	23–25	21–25		90–87	P2
19 Jun	Serbia and Montenegro	3–0	Cuba	25–22	26–24	25–19			76–65	P2
19 Jun	China	0–3	Italy	26–28	15–25	15–25			56–78	P2
25 Jun	Italy	2–3	Serbia and Montenegro	25–21	30–32	25–17	24–26	8–15	112–111	P2
25 Jun	China	3–1	Cuba	25–23	21–25	25–21	25–23		96–92	P2
26 Jun	China	3–1	Cuba	21–25	25–23	25–20	25–21		96–89	P2
27 Jun	Italy	1–3	Serbia and Montenegro	25–22	20–25	17–25	19–25		81–97	P2
2 Jul	Cuba	2–3	Italy	25–17	16–25	25–21	19–25	8–15	93–103	P2
3 Jul	China	2–3	Serbia and Montenegro	25–27	27–25	20–25	25–20	11–15	108–112	P2
3 Jul	Cuba	0–3	Italy	21–25	19–25	20–25			60–75	P2
4 Jul	China	0–3	Serbia and Montenegro	20–25	23–25	20–25			63–75	P2
9 Jul	Cuba	3–1	China	25–22	25–19	20–25	25–22		95–88	P2
10 Jul	Serbia and Montenegro	3–1	Italy	26–24	25–17	23–25	25–20		99–86	P2
10 Jul	Cuba	3–0	China	25–18	25–23	25–18			75–59	P2
11 Jul	Serbia and Montenegro	3–0	Italy	25–20	25–16	25–18			75–54	P2

== Final round ==
- Venue: PalaLottomatica, Rome, Italy
- All times are Central European Summer Time (UTC+02:00).

=== First final round ===
Date	Time		Score		Set 1	Set 2	Set 3	Set 4	Set 5	Total	Report
16 Jul	18:37	Italy	3–0	Serbia and Montenegro	25–18	25–22	25–23			75–63	P2
16 Jul	21:07	Brazil	3–1	Bulgaria	25–17	32–30	18–25	25–21		100–93	P2

=== Final four ===
Semifinals
17 July
Brazil	3
Serbia and Montenegro	0
17 July
Italy	3
Bulgaria	0

Final
18 July
Brazil	3
Italy	1
3rd place match
18 July
Serbia and Montenegro	3
Bulgaria	0

==== Semifinals ====
Date	Time		Score		Set 1	Set 2	Set 3	Set 4	Set 5	Total	Report
17 Jul	18:37	Italy	3–0	Bulgaria	25–21	25–18	25–21			75–60	P2
17 Jul	21:07	Brazil	3–0	Serbia and Montenegro	25–23	32–30	25–20			82–73	P2

==== 3rd place match ====
Date	Time		Score		Set 1	Set 2	Set 3	Set 4	Set 5	Total	Report
18 Jul	16:07	Serbia and Montenegro	3–0	Bulgaria	25–23	25–19	25–20			75–62	P2

==== Final ====
Date	Time		Score		Set 1	Set 2	Set 3	Set 4	Set 5	Total	Report
18 Jul	18:37	Brazil	3–1	Italy	27–25	25–19	25–27	25–17		102–88	P2

== Final standing ==
Place	Team
1st place, gold medalist(s)	Brazil
2nd place, silver medalist(s)	Italy
3rd place, bronze medalist(s)	Serbia and Montenegro
4	Bulgaria
5	France
5	Greece
7	Cuba
7	Poland
7	Spain
10	China
10	Japan
10	Portugal

2004 World League champions

Brazil
4th title

Team Roster
Giovane Gávio, André Heller, Henrique Randow, Mauricio Lima, Gilberto Godoy Filho, Murilo Endres, André Nascimento, Sérgio Dutra Santos, Anderson Rodrigues, Gustavo Endres, Ricardo Garcia, Dante Amaral
Head coach
Bernardo Rezende

== Awards ==
- Best scorer (most valuable player)
  (Italy) Andrea Sartoretti
- Best spiker
  (Italy) Samuele Papi
- Best blocker
  (Italy) Luigi Mastrangelo
- Best server
  (Bulgaria) Matey Kaziyski
