= 2010 FIVB Men's Volleyball World Championship squads =

This is a list of all participating squads of the 2010 FIVB Men's Volleyball World Championship, held in several cities in Italy from 25 September to 10 October 2010.

== Squads ==
=== Argentina ===
The following is the Argentine roster in the 2010 FIVB Men's Volleyball World Championship.

Head coach:	Javier Weber
Assistant:	Flavio Leoni

No.	Name	Date of birth	2010 club
1	Mariano Giustiniano	4 April 1986	(Argentina) Boca Juniors
2	Pablo Crer	6 December 1989	(Argentina) Rosario Sonder
3	Martín Blanco Costa	16 December 1985	(Argentina) Club La Unión
4	Lucas Ocampo	20 March 1986	(Italy) Zinella Volley Bologna
5	Nicolás Uriarte	21 March 1990	(Italy) Zinella Volley Bologna
6	Gustavo Scholtis	16 December 1982	(Puerto Rico) Indios de Mayagüez
7	Facundo Conte	25 August 1989	(Italy) Zinella Volley Bologna
8	Demián González	21 February 1983	(Argentina) UPCN Vóley Club
9	Rodrigo Quiroga (C)	23 March 1987	(Italy) Tonno Callipo Vibo Valentia
11	Sebastián Sole	12 June 1991	(Argentina) Rosario Sonder
12	Federico Pereyra	19 June 1988	(Argentina) Club Ciudad de Bolívar
15	Luciano De Cecco	2 June 1988	(Russia) Dynamo-Yantar Kaliningrad
16	Alexis González	21 July 1981	(France) Tours VB
18	Franco López	4 February 1989	

=== Australia ===
The following is the Australian roster in the 2010 FIVB Men's Volleyball World Championship.

Head coach:	Russell Borgeaud
Assistant:	Andrew Strugnell

No.	Name	Date of birth	2010 club
1	Aidan Zingel	19 November 1990	(Sweden) Linköpings VC
3	Nathan Roberts	17 February 1986	(Italy) Pallavolo Pineto
4	Benjamin Hardy (C)	21 September 1974	(Poland) Jastrzębski Węgiel
5	Travis Passier	26 April 1989	(Denmark) Marienlyst Odense
6	Igor Yudin	17 June 1987	(Poland) Jastrzębski Węgiel
7	Matthew Young	17 July 1981	
8	Andrew Grant	22 April 1985	(Finland) Pielaveden Sampoa
9	Adam White	8 November 1989	(Netherlands) Langhenkel Orion
10	Shane Alexander	7 January 1986	(Greece) Foinikas Syros
11	Joel Tyrrell	9 December 1989	
12	Aden Tutton	6 December 1984	(Netherlands) Langhenkel Orion
16	William Thwaite	8 September 1987	
17	Paul Carroll	16 May 1986	(Italy) Volley Forli
19	Thomas Edgar	21 June 1989	(Sweden) Linköpings VC

=== Brazil ===
The following is the Brazilian roster in the 2010 FIVB Men's Volleyball World Championship.

Head coach:	Bernardo Rezende
Assistant:	Roberley Luiz Leonaldo

No.	Name	Date of birth	2010 club
1	Bruno Rezende	2 July 1986	(Brazil) Cimed Florianópolis
4	Alan Domingos	15 February 1980	(Brazil) Esporte Clube Pinheiros
5	Sidão	9 July 1982	(Brazil) SESI São Paulo
6	Leandro Vissotto	30 April 1983	(Italy) Itas Diatec Trentino
7	Giba (C)	23 December 1976	(Brazil) Esporte Clube Pinheiros
8	Murilo Endres	3 May 1981	(Brazil) SESI São Paulo
9	Théo Lopes	31 August 1983	(Japan) Suntory Sunbirds
12	João Paulo Tavares	30 March 1983	(Japan) Panasonic Panthers
13	João Paulo Bravo	7 January 1979	(Italy) CoprAtlantide Piacenza
14	Rodrigão	17 April 1979	(Brazil) Esporte Clube Pinheiros
16	Lucas Saatkamp	6 March 1986	(Brazil) Cimed Florianópolis
17	Marlon Muraguti Yared	27 July 1977	(Brazil) Brasil Vôlei Clube
18	Dante Amaral	30 September 1980	(Russia) Dinamo Moscow
19	Mário Pedreira	5 March 1982	(Brazil) Cimed Florianópolis

=== Bulgaria ===
The following is the Bulgarian roster in the 2010 FIVB Men's Volleyball World Championship.

Head coach:	Silvano Prandi
Assistant:	Camillo Placì

No.	Name	Date of birth	2010 club
2	Hristo Tsvetanov	29 March 1978	(Russia) Lokomotiv Yekaterinburg
3	Andrey Zhekov	12 March 1980	(Greece) Olympiacos Piraeus
4	Vladislav Ivanov	14 March 1987	(Bulgaria) Levski Volley
5	Svetoslav Gotsev	31 August 1990	(Bulgaria) Pirin Razlog
6	Matey Kaziyski	23 September 1984	(Italy) Itas Diatec Trentino
10	Valentin Bratoev	21 October 1987	(Italy) Pallavolo Massa
11	Vladimir Nikolov (C)	3 October 1977	(Italy) Bre Banca Lannutti Cuneo
12	Viktor Yosifov	16 October 1985	(Italy) Roma Volley
13	Teodor Salparov	16 August 1982	(Russia) Dinamo Moscow
15	Todor Aleksiev	21 April 1983	(Russia) Lokomotiv Yekaterinburg
17	Nikolay Penchev	22 May 1992	(Bulgaria) Victoria Plovdiv
18	Nikolay Nikolov	29 July 1986	(Bulgaria) CSKA Sofia
19	Tsvetan Sokolov	31 December 1989	(Italy) Itas Diatec Trentino
20	Konstantin Mitev	27 October 1984	(Bulgaria) Arda Kardzhali

=== Canada ===
The following is the Canadian roster in the 2010 FIVB Men's Volleyball World Championship.

Head coach:	Glenn Hoag
Assistant:	Vincent Pichette

No.	Name	Date of birth	2010 club
1	Louis-Pierre Mainville (C)	3 April 1986	
2	Nicholas Cundy	14 September 1983	(Portugal) Benfica Lisboa
3	Daniel Lewis	3 April 1976	(Slovenia) ACH Volley
4	Joshua Howatson	7 October 1984	(Spain) Unicaja Almería
6	Justin Duff	10 May 1988	(Canada) Winnipeg Wesmen
7	Dallas Soonias	25 April 1984	(Spain) Unicaja Almería
8	Adam Simac	9 August 1983	(Germany) VC Franken
9	Dustin Schneider	27 February 1985	(Austria) VCA Niederösterreich
10	Toontje Van Lankvelt	1 July 1984	(Austria) SK Posojilnica Aich-Dob
12	Gavin Schmitt	27 January 1986	(South Korea) Daejeon Samsung Bluefangs
13	Olivier Faucher	14 September 1984	
14	Adam Kaminski	27 May 1984	(Slovenia) OK Salonit Anhovo Kanal
15	Frederic Winters	25 September 1982	(Turkey) Halkbank Ankara
17	John Gordon Perrin	17 August 1989	(Canada) Thompson Rivers WolfPack

=== China ===
The following is the Chinese roster in the 2010 FIVB Men's Volleyball World Championship.

Head coach:	Zhou Jianan
Assistant:	Xie Guochen

No.	Name	Date of birth	2010 club
1	Bian Hongmin	22 September 1989	(China) Zhejiang New Century Tourism
3	Yuan Zhi	29 September 1981	(China) Liaoning Brilliance Auto
4	Zhang Chen	28 June 1985	(China) Jiangsu Zenith Steel
5	Guo Peng	1 July 1982	(China) Ba'yi Keming Surface Industry
7	Zhong Weijun	20 April 1989	(China) Ba'yi Keming Surface Industry
8	Cui Jianjun	1 August 1985	(China) Henan Tianguan
9	Jiao Shuai	28 January 1984	(China) Henan Tianguan
10	Chen Ping	1 September 1989	(China) Jiangsu Zenith Steel
12	Shen Qiong (C)	5 September 1981	(China) Shanghai Volleyball Club
14	Xu Jingtao	7 July 1988	(China) Ba'yi Keming Surface Industry
15	Li Runming	1 March 1990	(China) Shandong Volleyball CLub
16	Ren Qi	24 February 1984	(China) Shanghai Volleyball Club

=== Cameroon ===
The following is the Cameroonian roster in the 2010 FIVB Men's Volleyball World Championship.

Head coach:	Peter Nonnenbroich
Assistant:	Reniof Blaise Mayam

No.	Name	Date of birth	2010 club
1	Olivier Nongny Mefani	9 February 1987	
2	Georges Kari	13 July 1981	
5	Fadawa Oumarou	18 July 1987	
6	Malloum Adam Abbas (C)	12 April 1971	
7	Jean Patrice Ndaki Mboulet	5 May 1979	
9	Jean Pierre Ndongo	5 February 1986	
10	Maliki Moussa	2 February 1978	(France) Nantes Rezé Métropole Volley
11	Francis Tonemassa	31 August 1980	(France) Saint-Quentin Volley
12	Sem Dolegombai	18 May 1990	
13	Jean Merlin Nziemi	13 October 1974	
14	Nathan Wounembaina	22 November 1984	(Belgium) VC Euphony Asse-Lennik
16	David Feughouo	5 May 1989	(France) AS Cannes Volley-Ball
17	Serge Patrice Ag	22 March 1974	
18	Alain Fossi Kamto	4 November 1980	

=== Cuba ===
The following is the Cuban roster in the 2010 FIVB Men's Volleyball World Championship.

Head coach:	Orlando Samuels Blackwood
Assistant:	Idalberto Valdez Pedro

No.	Name	Date of birth	2010 club
1	Wilfredo León	31 July 1993	Santiago De Cuba
4	Yoandy Leal	31 August 1988	(Cuba) La Habana
6	Keibel Gutiérrez	6 May 1987	(Cuba) Ciudad Habana
7	Osmany Camejo	18 February 1983	(Cuba) Villa Clara
8	Rolando Cepeda	13 March 1989	(Cuba) Sancti Spíritus
11	Rafael Ortiz Ortega	3 February 1990	(Cuba) Ciudad Habana
12	Henry Bell Cisnero	27 July 1983	Santiago De Cuba
13	Robertlandy Simón (C)	11 June 1987	(Cuba) Ciudad Habana
14	Raydel Hierrezuelo	14 July 1987	(Cuba) Ciudad Habana
16	Isbel Mesa Sandobal	2 June 1989	(Cuba) Ciudad Habana
18	Yoandri Díaz	4 January 1985	(Cuba) Ciudad Habana
19	Fernando Hernández	11 September 1989	(Cuba) Ciudad Habana

=== Czech Republic ===
The following is the Czech roster in the 2010 FIVB Men's Volleyball World Championship.

Head coach:	Jan Svoboda
Assistant:	Milan Hadrava

No.	Name	Date of birth	2010 club
2	Jiří Popelka	11 May 1977	(Italy) New Mater Castellana Grotte
6	Petr Konečný	16 February 1975	(France) Tours VB
7	Aleš Holubec	13 March 1984	(France) Tours VB
8	Martin Kryštof	11 October 1982	(Germany) Berlin Recycling Volleys
9	Ondřej Hudeček	9 May 1981	(France) Montpellier UC
12	Jakub Veselý	2 September 1986	(France) Arago de Sète
13	Jiří Bence	8 May 1985	(Czech Republic) VO Příbram
14	Petr Zapletal	20 December 1977	(Turkey) Bozkurt Belediyesi
15	Jan Štokr	16 January 1983	(Italy) RPA-LuigiBacchi.it Perugia
16	Peter Pláteník	16 March 1981	(Turkey) Ziraat Bankası Ankara
17	David Konečný	10 October 1982	(France) Tours VB
18	Lukáš Ticháček	12 January 1982	(Germany) VfB Friedrichshafen

=== Egypt ===
The following is the Egyptian roster in the 2010 FIVB Men's Volleyball World Championship.

Head coach:	Antonio Giacobbe
Assistant:	Sherif el-Shemerly

No.	Name	Date of birth	2010 club
1	Saleh Youssef	25 July 1982	(Egypt) Zamalek Giza
2	Abdalla Ahmed	10 October 1983	(Qatar) Al Arabi Doha
4	Ahmad Abd al-Hajj	19 August 1984	(Egypt) Al Alhy Cairo
5	Abdel Latif Ahmed	13 August 1983	(Egypt) Al Alhy Cairo
6	Wael Al Aydy	8 December 1971	(Egypt) Al Alhy Cairo
7	Ashraf Abouelhassan (C)	17 May 1975	(Egypt) Zamalek Giza
9	Rashad Attia	2 September 1986	(Egypt) Tala'a El-Gaish
10	Ahmed Kotb	6 September 1991	(Egypt) Al Alhy Cairo
11	Ahmed Afifi	30 March 1988	(Egypt) Zamalek Giza
13	Mohamed Badawy	11 January 1986	(Egypt) Zamalek Giza
14	Ahmed El Sheikh	19 July 1988	(Egypt) Zamalek Giza
17	Mahmoud Abdel Kader	12 May 1985	(Egypt) Al Alhy Cairo

=== France ===
The following is the French roster in the 2010 FIVB Men's Volleyball World Championship.

Head coach:	Philippe Blain
Assistant:	Olivier Lecat

No.	Name	Date of birth	2010 club
2	Hubert Henno	6 October 1976	(Italy) Bre Banca Lannutti Cuneo
3	Gérald Hardy-Dessources	9 February 1983	(France) AS Cannes Volley-Ball
4	Antonin Rouzier	18 August 1986	(France) Stade Poitevin Poitiers
5	Romain Vadeleux	12 February 1983	(France) Saint-Quentin Volley
6	Benjamin Toniutti	30 October 1989	(France) Arago de Sète
7	Stéphane Antiga	3 February 1976	(Poland) PGE Skra Bełchatów
8	Earvin N’Gapeth	23 March 1991	(France) Tours VB
9	Guillaume Samica	28 September 1981	(Greece) Panathinaikos Athens
11	Édouard Rowlandson	20 July 1988	(France) Arago de Sète
12	Nicolas Marechal	4 March 1987	(France) Stade Poitevin Poitiers
13	Pierre Pujol	13 July 1984	(France) AS Cannes Volley-Ball
16	Kévin Le Roux	11 May 1989	(France) AS Cannes Volley-Ball
17	Oliver Kieffer (C)	27 August 1979	(France) Stade Poitevin Poitiers
18	Jean-François Exiga	9 March 1982	(Italy) Acqua Paradiso Monza Brianza

=== Germany ===
The following is the German roster in the 2010 FIVB Men's Volleyball World Championship.

Head coach:	Raúl Lozano
Assistant:	Juan Manuel Serramalera

No.	Name	Date of birth	2010 club
1	Sebastian Prüsener	26 May 1982	(Germany) Netzhoppers Königs Wusterhausen
3	Sebastian Schwarz	2 October 1985	(Germany) Generali Unterhaching
4	Simon Tischer	24 April 1982	(Greece) Iraklis Thessaloniki
5	Björn Andrae (C)	14 May 1981	(Italy) Tonno Callipo Vibo Valentia
6	Denys Kaliberda	24 June 1990	(Germany) Generali Unterhaching
7	Lukas Bauer	26 February 1989	(Germany) VfB Friedrichshafen
8	Marcus Böhme	25 August 1985	(Germany) VfB Friedrichshafen
10	Jochen Schöps	8 October 1983	(Russia) Iskra Odintsovo
12	Ferdinand Tille	8 December 1988	(Germany) Generali Unterhaching
13	Christian Dünnes	16 June 1984	(Germany) SWD Powervolleys Düren
14	Robert Kromm	9 March 1984	(Italy) Marmi Lanza Verona
15	Max Günthör	9 August 1985	(Germany) Generali Unterhaching
17	Patrick Steuerwald	3 March 1986	(Germany) Generali Unterhaching
18	Georg Grozer	27 November 1984	(Germany) VfB Friedrichshafen

=== Iran ===
The following is the Iranian roster in the 2010 FIVB Men's Volleyball World Championship.

Head coach:	Hossein Maadani
Assistant:	Behrouz Ataei

No.	Name	Date of birth	2010 club
1	Adel Gholami	9 February 1986	(Iran) Kaleh Mazandaran
3	Mojtaba Attar	7 August 1979	(Iran) Damash Gilan
4	Saeid Marouf	20 October 1985	(Iran) Saipa Karaj
6	Mohammad Mousavi	22 August 1987	(Iran) Paykan Tehran
7	Hamzeh Zarini	18 October 1985	(Iran) Damash Gilan
9	Alireza Nadi (C)	2 September 1980	(Iran) Damash Gilan
10	Mohsen Andalib	17 July 1983	(Iran) Saipa Karaj
12	Farhad Nazari Afshar	22 May 1984	(Iran) Saipa Karaj
13	Mehdi Mahdavi	13 February 1984	(Iran) Damash Gilan
14	Arash Keshavarzi	16 February 1987	(Iran) Damash Gilan
15	Hesam Bakhsheshi	21 March 1984	(Iran) Paykan Tehran
16	Abdolreza Alizadeh	19 February 1987	(Iran) Kaleh Mazandaran
18	Mohammad Mohammadkazem	19 May 1987	(Iran) Paykan Tehran
19	Arash Kamalvand	11 May 1989	(Iran) Paykan Tehran

=== Italy ===
The following is the Italian roster in the 2010 FIVB Men's Volleyball World Championship.

Head coach:	Andrea Anastasi
Assistant:	Andrea Gardini

No.	Name	Date of birth	2010 club
1	Luigi Mastrangelo	17 August 1975	(Italy) Bre Banca Lannutti Cuneo
2	Davide Marra	12 March 1984	(Italy) Pallavolo Loreto
3	Simone Parodi	16 June 1986	(Italy) Bre Banca Lannutti Cuneo
4	Andrea Bari	5 March 1980	(Italy) Itas Diatec Trentino
5	Valerio Vermiglio (C)	1 March 1976	(Italy) Lube Banca Macerata
7	Michał Łasko	11 March 1981	(Italy) Marmi Lanza Verona
11	Cristian Savani	22 February 1982	(Italy) Sir Safety Perugia
12	Simone Buti	19 September 1983	(Italy) Marmi Lanza Verona
13	Dragan Travica	28 August 1986	(Italy) Acqua Paradiso Monza Brianza
14	Alessandro Fei	29 November 1978	(Italy) Sisley Treviso
15	Emanuele Birarelli	8 February 1981	(Italy) Itas Diatec Trentino
17	Andrea Sala	27 December 1978	(Italy) Itas Diatec Trentino
18	Matej Černic	13 September 1978	(Italy) RPA-LuigiBacchi.it Perugia
19	Ivan Zaytsev	2 October 1988	(Italy) M. Roma Volley

=== Japan ===
The following is the Japan roster in the 2010 FIVB Men's Volleyball World Championship.

Head coach:	Tatsuya Ueta
Assistant:	Naoki Morokuma

No.	Name	Date of birth	2010 club
1	Daisuke Sakai	22 October 1981	(Japan) JT Thunders
2	Yuta Abe	8 August 1981	(Japan) Torray Arrows
3	Takeshi Nagano	11 July 1985	(Japan) Panasonic Panthers
4	Daisaku Nishio	10 June 1982	(Japan) Osaka Blazers Sakai
6	Yoshifumi Suzuki	31 March 1983	(Japan) Suntory Sunbirds
9	Takaaki Tomimatsu	20 July 1984	(Japan) Torray Arrows
11	Yoshihiko Matsumoto	7 January 1981	(Japan) Osaka Blazers Sakai
12	Kota Yamamura (C)	20 October 1980	(Japan) Suntory Sunbirds
13	Kunihiro Shimizu	11 August 1986	(Japan) Panasonic Panthers
14	Tatsuya Fukuzawa	1 July 1986	(Japan) Panasonic Panthers
16	Yusuke Ishijima	9 January 1984	(Japan) Osaka Blazers Sakai
17	Yu Koshikawa	30 June 1984	(Italy) Pallavolo Padova
18	Yuta Yoneyama	29 August 1984	(Japan) Torray Arrows
19	Shun Imamura	20 July 1987	(Japan) Osaka Blazers Sakai

=== Mexico ===
The following is the Mexican roster in the 2010 FIVB Men's Volleyball World Championship.

Head coach:	Jorge Azair
Assistant:	Sergio Hernández Herrera

No.	Name	Date of birth	2010 club
1	Mario Becerra	18 May 1978	
2	Edgar Herrera	22 January 1988	
4	Gustavo Mayer	3 October 1979	
5	Jesús Rangel	20 September 1980	
6	Samuel Córdova	13 March 1989	
7	Iván Contreras (C)	29 January 1974	(Belgium) Knack Randstad Roeselare
8	Ignacio Ramírez	17 September 1976	
9	Carlos Guerra	3 August 1981	
10	Pedro Rangel	16 September 1988	
12	José Martell	21 October 1976	
14	Tomas Aguilera	15 November 1988	
15	Leonardo Manzo	2 May 1989	
18	Irving Bricio	3 September 1980	
19	Jorge Quiñones	13 November 1981	

=== Poland ===
The following is the Polish roster in the 2010 FIVB Men's Volleyball World Championship.

Head coach:	Daniel Castellani
Assistant:	Krzysztof Stelmach

No.	Name	Date of birth	2010 club
1	Piotr Nowakowski	18 December 1987	(Poland) AZS Częstochowa
2	Michał Winiarski	28 September 1983	(Poland) PGE Skra Bełchatów
3	Piotr Gruszka	8 March 1977	(Poland) Delecta Bydgoszcz
5	Paweł Zagumny (C)	18 October 1977	(Greece) Panathinaikos Athens
6	Bartosz Kurek	29 August 1988	(Poland) PGE Skra Bełchatów
9	Zbigniew Bartman	4 May 1987	(Italy) Prisma Volley
10	Mariusz Wlazły	4 August 1983	(Poland) PGE Skra Bełchatów
12	Patryk Czarnowski	1 November 1985	(Poland) Jastrzębski Węgiel
14	Michał Ruciak	22 August 1983	(Poland) ZAKSA Kędzierzyn-Koźle
15	Piotr Gacek	16 September 1978	(Poland) PGE Skra Bełchatów
16	Krzysztof Ignaczak	15 May 1978	(Poland) Asseco Resovia Rzeszów
17	Michał Bąkiewicz	22 March 1981	(Poland) PGE Skra Bełchatów
18	Marcin Możdżonek	9 February 1985	(Poland) PGE Skra Bełchatów
19	Grzegorz Łomacz	1 October 1987	(Poland) Jastrzębski Węgiel

=== Puerto Rico ===
The following is the Puerto Rican roster in the 2010 FIVB Men's Volleyball World Championship.

Head coach:	Carlos Cardona
Assistant:	Ramón Hernández

No.	Name	Date of birth	2010 club
1	José Rivera	2 July 1977	(Puerto Rico) Nuevos Gigantes de Carolina
2	Harry Rosario	9 January 1976	(Puerto Rico) Plataneros de Corozal
3	Juan Figueroa	3 June 1986	(Puerto Rico) Plataneros de Corozal
4	Víctor Rivera	30 August 1976	(Puerto Rico) Mets de Guaynabo
5	Roberto Muñiz	11 June 1980	(Puerto Rico) Leones de Ponce
6	Ángel Pérez	20 May 1982	(Puerto Rico) Mets de Guaynabo
7	Enrique Escalante	6 August 1984	(Puerto Rico) Plataneros de Corozal
8	Daniel Erazo	16 August 1987	(Puerto Rico) Plataneros de Corozal
9	Luis Rodríguez	13 July 1969	(Puerto Rico) Mets de Guaynabo
12	Héctor Soto (C)	20 June 1978	(Turkey) Arkas Izmir
13	Alexis Matías	21 July 1974	(Puerto Rico) Mets de Guaynabo
14	Fernando Morales	4 February 1982	(Puerto Rico) Plataneros de Corozal

=== Russia ===
The following is the Russian roster in the 2010 FIVB Men's Volleyball World Championship.

Head coach:	Daniele Bagnoli
Assistant:	Yaroslav Antonov

No.	Name	Date of birth	2010 club
1	Evgeny Sivozhelez	6 August 1986	(Russia) Dinamo Moscow
2	Semyon Poltavskiy	8 February 1981	(Russia) Dinamo Moscow
4	Taras Khtey	22 May 1982	(Russia) Lokomotiv-Belogorie Belgorod
6	Sergey Grankin (C)	21 January 1985	(Russia) Dinamo Moscow
8	Denis Biryukov	8 December 1988	(Russia) Lokomotiv-Belogorie Belgorod
10	Yury Berezhko	27 January 1984	(Russia) Dinamo Moscow
11	Sergey Makarov	28 March 1980	(Russia) Iskra Odintsovo
13	Dmitry Muserskiy	29 October 1988	(Russia) Lokomotiv-Belogorie Belgorod
14	Anton Astashenkov	27 October 1981	(Russia) Iskra Odintsovo
15	Aleksandr Volkov	14 February 1985	(Russia) Dinamo Moscow
16	Aleksey Verbov	31 January 1982	(Russia) Zenit Kazan
17	Maxim Mikhaylov	19 March 1988	(Russia) Yaroslavich Yaroslavl
18	Dmitry Shcherbinin	10 September 1989	(Russia) Dinamo Moscow
19	Valery Komarov	21 March 1980	(Russia) Lokomotiv Novosibirsk

=== Serbia ===
The following is the Serbian roster in the 2010 FIVB Men's Volleyball World Championship.

Head coach:	Igor Kolaković
Assistant:	Željko Bulatović

No.	Name	Date of birth	2010 club
1	Nikola Kovačević	14 February 1983	(Greece) Aris Thessaloniki
4	Bojan Janić	11 March 1982	(Russia) Yaroslavich Yaroslavl
5	Vlado Petković	6 January 1983	(South Korea) Seoul Woori Card Wibee
6	Miloš Terzić	13 June 1987	(Serbia) OK Crvena Zvezda
7	Dragan Stanković	18 October 1985	(Italy) Lube Banca Macerata
8	Marko Samardžić	22 February 1983	(Greece) Aris Thessaloniki
9	Nikola Grbić (C)	6 September 1973	(Italy) Bre Banca Lannutti Cuneo
10	Miloš Nikić	31 March 1986	(Italy) Andreoli Latina
12	Milan Rašić	2 February 1985	(Serbia) OK Crvena Zvezda
14	Ivan Miljković	13 September 1979	(Greece) Olympiacos Pireaus
15	Saša Starović	19 October 1988	(Russia) Ural Ufa
17	Borislav Petrović	6 January 1988	(Serbia) OK Vojvodina
18	Marko Podraščanin	29 August 1987	(Italy) Lube Banca Macerata
19	Nikola Rosić	5 August 1984	(Germany) VfB Friedrichshafen

=== Spain ===
The following is the Spanish roster in the 2010 FIVB Men's Volleyball World Championship.

Head coach:	Julio Velasco
Assistant:	Francisco Manuel Hervás

No.	Name	Date of birth	2010 club
2	Gustavo Saucedo	5 January 1978	(Spain) Tarragona SPiSP
4	Manuel Sevillano	2 July 1981	(Spain) Unicaja Almería
5	Francisco José Rodríguez	15 September 1980	(Spain) CV Teruel
6	Sergio Noda	23 March 1987	(Italy) Volley Lupi Santa Croce
7	Guillermo Hernán	25 July 1985	(Spain) CV Teruel
8	Alberto Salas	13 September 1984	(Spain) Numancia CMA Soria
10	Jorge Fernández Valcárcel	4 May 1989	(Spain) CV Pòrtol
12	Francesc Llenas	13 September 1982	(Spain) CV Teruel
13	Jordi Gens	21 July 1978	(Greece) Panellinios Kypseli
14	Ibán Pérez	13 November 1983	(Spain) CV Teruel
16	Julián García-Torres (C)	8 November 1980	(Spain) CV Teruel
17	Marlon Palharini	3 February 1984	(Spain) CV Barcelona

=== Tunisia ===
The following is the Tunisian roster in the 2010 FIVB Men's Volleyball World Championship.

Head coach:	Mkaouar Fethi
Assistant:	Hedi Karray

No.	Name	Date of birth	2010 club
1	Niaz Sallem	10 May 1988	
2	Ahmed Kadhi	19 April 1989	
4	Marouen Garci	21 March 1988	
8	Mohamed Ben Slimen (C)	29 November 1981	
10	Hamza Nagga	29 May 1990	
11	Ismail Moalla	30 January 1990	
12	Anouer Taouerghi	17 August 1983	
13	Haykel Jerbi	4 April 1988	
15	Amen Allah Hmissi	6 April 1988	
16	Hichem Kaabi	13 September 1986	
18	Aymen Karoui	7 April 1989	
19	Nabil Miladi	28 February 1989	

=== United States ===
The following is the American roster in the 2010 FIVB Men's Volleyball World Championship.

Head coach:	Alan Knipe
Assistant:	Gary Sato

No.	Name	Date of birth	2010 club
1	Matthew Anderson	18 April 1987	(South Korea) Cheonan Hyundai Capital Skywalkers
2	Sean Rooney	13 November 1982	(Russia) Fakel Novy Urengoy
4	David Lee	8 March 1982	(Russia) Lokomotiv Novosibirsk
5	Richard Lambourne	6 May 1975	(Poland) Delecta Bydgoszcz
6	Paul Lotman	3 November 1985	(France) Stade Poitevin Poitiers
7	Jonathan Winder	4 January 1986	(Germany) VC Bottrop 90
8	William Priddy (C)	1 October 1977	(Russia) Lokomotiv Novosibirsk
10	Riley Salmon	2 July 1976	(Brazil) Minas Tênis Clube
13	Clayton Stanley	20 January 1978	(Russia) Zenit Kazan
14	Kevin Hansen	19 March 1982	(Russia) Fakel Novy Urengoy
15	Russell Holmes	1 July 1982	(Austria) Hypo Tirol Innsbruck
16	Carson Clark	20 January 1989	(United States) University of California
17	Maxwell Holt	12 March 1987	(Italy) Marmi Lanza Verona
19	Alfredo Reft	15 December 1982	(Portugal) Benfica Lisboa

=== Venezuela ===
The following is the Venezuelan roster in the 2010 FIVB Men's Volleyball World Championship.

Head coach:	Idolo Gilberto Herrera Delgado
Assistant:	Renee Oliveros Ortega

No.	Name	Date of birth	2010 club
1	Régulo Briceño	13 February 1989	
2	Deivi Yustiz	15 June 1985	
4	Joel Silva	14 September 1985	
5	Rodman Valera	20 April 1982	
7	Luis Díaz	20 August 1983	(Italy) Trenkwalder Modena
8	Máximo Montoya	26 June 1989	
9	José Carrasco	20 May 1989	
12	Carlos Tejeda	28 July 1980	
13	Iván Márquez	4 October 1981	(Italy) Tonno Callipo Vibo Valentia
14	Thomas Ereu	25 October 1979	(Italy) Pallavolo Pineto
15	Luis Arias	17 January 1989	
18	Fredy Cedeño	10 September 1981	(Cyprus) Anorthosis Famagusta
