= 2006 FIVB Men's Volleyball World Championship squads =

This is a list of the all participating squads at the 2006 FIVB Men's Volleyball World Championship, held in several cities in Japan from 17 November to 3 December 2006.

== Squads ==
=== Argentina ===
#NR	NAME	BIRTHDATE
1.	Marcos Milinkovic	22 December 1971 (aged 34)
2.	Jerónimo Bidegain	16 January 1977 (aged 29)
4.	Nicolás Efrón	10 March 1979 (aged 27)
5.	Aníbal Gramaglia	29 December 1981 (aged 24)
6.	Gustavo Scholtis	16 December 1982 (aged 23)
8.	Leandro Concina	4 November 1984 (aged 22)
15.	Luciano De Cecco	2 June 1988 (aged 18)
16.	Martín Hernández	23 March 1985 (aged 21)
17.	Pablo Meana	10 June 1975 (aged 31)
18.	Gastón Giani	26 April 1979 (aged 27)
Coach	Jon Uriarte	15 October 1961 (aged 45)

=== Australia ===
#NR	NAME	BIRTHDATE
1.	Daniel Howard	13 December 1976 (aged 29)
3.	Nathan Roberts	17 February 1986 (aged 20)
4.	Benjamin Hardy	21 September 1974 (aged 32)
5.	Luke Campbell	8 November 1979 (aged 27)
6.	Igor Yudin	17 June 1987 (aged 19)
7.	Matthew Young	17 July 1981 (aged 25)
8.	Andrew Grant	22 April 1985 (aged 21)
9.	Andrew Earl	15 September 1982 (aged 24)
11.	Phillip DeSalvo	11 March 1985 (aged 21)
14.	Nigel Panagopka	19 July 1987 (aged 19)
17.	Paul Carroll	16 May 1986 (aged 20)
18.	Brett Alderman	27 February 1979 (aged 27)
Coach	Russell Borgeaud	

=== Brazil ===
#NR	NAME	BIRTHDATE
2.	Marcelinho	9 November 1974 (aged 32)
4.	André Heller	17 December 1975 (aged 30)
7.	Gilberto Godoy	23 December 1976 (aged 29)
8.	Murilo Endres	3 May 1981 (aged 25)
9.	André Nascimento	4 March 1979 (aged 27)
10.	Sérgio Santos	15 October 1975 (aged 31)
11.	Anderson Rodrigues	21 May 1974 (aged 32)
12.	Samuel Fuchs	4 March 1984 (aged 22)
13.	Gustavo Endres	23 August 1975 (aged 31)
14.	Rodrigo Santana	17 April 1979 (aged 27)
17.	Ricardo García	19 November 1975 (aged 30)
18.	Dante Amaral	30 September 1980 (aged 26)
Coach	Bernardo Rezende	28 May 1959 (aged 47)

=== Bulgaria ===
#NR	NAME	BIRTHDATE
1.	Evgeni Ivanov	June 3, 1974 (aged 32)
2.	Hristo Tsvetanov	29 March 1978 (aged 28)
3.	Andrey Zhekov	12 March 1980 (aged 26)
4.	Boyan Yordanov	12 March 1983 (aged 23)
5.	Ivan Zarev	25 June 1986 (aged 20)
6.	Matey Kaziyski	23 September 1984 (aged 22)
11.	Vladimir Nikolov	3 October 1977 (aged 29)
13.	Teodor Salparov	16 August 1982 (aged 24)
15.	Krasimir Gaydarski	23 February 1983 (aged 23)
16.	Todor Aleksiev	21 April 1983 (aged 23)
17.	Plamen Konstantinov	14 June 1973 (aged 33)
19.	Daniel Peev	11 May 1970 (aged 36)
Coach	Martin Stoev	

=== Canada ===
#NR	NAME	BIRTHDATE
1.	Louis-Pierre Mainville	3 April 1986 (aged 20)
2.	Christian Bernier	20 November 1981 (aged 24)
3.	Michael Munday	14 October 1980 (aged 26)
4.	Pascal Cardinal	24 May 1979 (aged 27)
8.	Scott Koskie	14 December 1971 (aged 34)
9.	Paul Duerden	22 October 1974 (aged 32)
10.	Brett Youngberg	15 September 1979 (aged 27)
11.	Steven Brinkman	12 January 1978 (aged 28)
13.	Daniel Lewis	3 April 1976 (aged 30)
14.	Murray Grapentine	24 August 1977 (aged 29)
15.	Frederic Winters	25 September 1982 (aged 24)
Coach	Glenn Hoag	

=== China ===
#NR	NAME	BIRTHDATE
3.	Cui Xiaodong	17 November 1980 (aged 26)
4.	Yuan Zhi	29 September 1981 (aged 25)
5.	Guo Peng	1 July 1982 (aged 24)
6.	Wang Haichuan	11 November 1979 (aged 27)
7.	Tang Miao	4 May 1982 (aged 24)
8.	Cui Jianjun	1 August 1985 (aged 21)
10.	Li Chun	1 April 1982 (aged 24)
11.	Yu Dawei	21 June 1984 (aged 22)
12.	Shen Qiong	5 September 1981 (aged 25)
14.	Jiang Fudong	10 January 1983 (aged 23)
16.	Ren Qi	24 February 1984 (aged 22)
17.	Sui Shengsheng	30 May 1980 (aged 26)
Coach	Zhou Jianan	

=== Cuba ===
#NR	NAME	BIRTHDATE
1.	Yadier Sánchez	8 January 1987 (aged 19)
2.	Tomás Aldazabal	30 May 1976 (aged 30)
3.	Jorge Luis Sánchez	23 March 1985 (aged 21)
4.	Yasser Portuondo	2 February 1983 (aged 23)
8.	Pavel Pimienta	3 February 1976 (aged 30)
9.	Michael Sánchez	5 June 1986 (aged 20)
13.	Robertlandy Simón	11 June 1987 (aged 19)
15.	Oriol Camejo	22 July 1986 (aged 20)
16.	Raydel Corrales	15 February 1982 (aged 24)
17.	Odelvis Dominic	6 May 1977 (aged 29)
18.	Yoandri Díaz	4 January 1985 (aged 21)
Coach	Roberto García	

=== Czech Republic ===
#NR	NAME	BIRTHDATE
1.	Martin Lébl	12 April 1980 (aged 26)
2.	Jiří Popelka	11 May 1977 (aged 29)
3.	Marek Novotný	4 May 1978 (aged 28)
6.	Ondřej Hudeček	9 May 1981 (aged 25)
7.	Michal Rak	14 August 1979 (aged 27)
11.	Jan Štokr	16 January 1983 (aged 23)
12.	Jiří Zadražil	12 November 1980 (aged 26)
14.	Petr Zapletal	20 December 1977 (aged 28)
15.	Přemysl Obdržálek	12 March 1977 (aged 29)
16.	Petr Pláteník	16 March 1981 (aged 25)
17.	David Konecný	10 October 1982 (aged 24)
18.	Lukáš Ticháček	12 January 1982 (aged 24)
Coach	Zdeněk Haník	

=== Egypt ===
#NR	NAME	BIRTHDATE
1.	Hamdy Awad	14 April 1972 (aged 34)
2.	Abdalla Ahmed	10 October 1983 (aged 23)
3.	Mohamed Gabal	21 January 1984 (aged 22)
4.	Ahmed Abd Elnaeim	19 August 1984 (aged 22)
5.	Ossama Bekheit	12 January 1977 (aged 29)
6.	Wael Al Aydy	8 December 1971 (aged 34)
7.	Ashraf Abouel Hassan	17 May 1975 (aged 31)
8.	Saleh Youssef	25 July 1982 (aged 24)
10.	Mahmoud Elkoumy	19 October 1983 (aged 23)
11.	Mohamed Elnafrawy	9 June 1983 (aged 23)
14.	Hossam Shaarawy	15 February 1984 (aged 22)
17.	Mahmoud Abdelkader	12 May 1985 (aged 21)
Coach	Rys Grzegorz	

=== France ===
#NR	NAME	BIRTHDATE
1.	Xavier Kapfer	7 November 1981 (aged 25)
3.	Gérald Hardy	9 February 1983 (aged 23)
7.	Stéphane Antiga	3 February 1976 (aged 30)
8.	Ludovic Castard	18 January 1983 (aged 23)
9.	Frantz Granvorka	10 March 1976 (aged 30)
11.	Loïc Le Marrec	1 March 1977 (aged 29)
12.	Florian Kilama	29 March 1982 (aged 24)
13.	Pierre Pujol	13 July 1984 (aged 22)
15.	Guillaume Samica	28 September 1981 (aged 25)
17.	Olivier Kieffer	27 August 1979 (aged 27)
18.	Jean-François Exiga	9 March 1982 (aged 24)
Coach	Phillipe Blain	

=== Germany ===
#NR	NAME	BIRTHDATE
1.	Marcus Popp	23 September 1981 (aged 25)
3.	Thomas Kröger	11 June 1979 (aged 27)
4.	Simon Tischer	24 April 1982 (aged 24)
5.	Björn Andrae	14 May 1981 (aged 25)
9.	Stefan Hübner	13 June 1975 (aged 31)
10.	Jochen Schöps	8 October 1983 (aged 23)
11.	Frank Dehne	14 February 1976 (aged 30)
12.	Christian Pampel	6 September 1979 (aged 27)
13.	Ralph Bergmann	26 May 1970 (aged 36)
14.	Robert Kromm	9 March 1984 (aged 22)
16.	Eugen Bakumovski	11 October 1980 (aged 26)
17.	Norbert Walter	1 July 1979 (aged 27)
Coach	Stelian Moculescu	

=== Greece ===
#NR	NAME	BIRTHDATE
1.	Konstantinos Christofidelis	26 June 1977 (aged 29)
6.	Vasileios Kournetas	2 August 1976 (aged 30)
7.	Georgios Stefanou	12 January 1981 (aged 25)
8.	Konstantinos Prousalis	6 October 1980 (aged 26)
10.	Ioannis Kyriakidis	7 July 1982 (aged 24)
11.	Nikolaos Roumeliotis	12 October 1978 (aged 28)
12.	Nikolaos Smaragdis	12 February 1982 (aged 24)
13.	Andreas Andreadis	14 January 1982 (aged 24)
14.	Sotirios Pantaleon	21 June 1980 (aged 26)
15.	Ilias Lappas	20 July 1979 (aged 27)
16.	Antrei Kravarik	28 July 1971 (aged 35)
18.	Tontor-Zlatkov Bayev	31 May 1977 (aged 29)
Coach	Konstantinos Charitonidis	

=== Iran ===
#NR	NAME	BIRTHDATE
1.	Amir Hossein Monazzami	10 March 1978 (aged 28)
2.	Mohammad Shariati	13 February 1979 (aged 27)
3.	Amir Hosseini	23 July 1975 (aged 31)
4.	Davoud Moghbeli	5 January 1983 (aged 23)
5.	Peyman Akbari	23 October 1977 (aged 29)
6.	Mohammad Mansouri	23 August 1986 (aged 20)
8.	Farhad Zarif	3 March 1983 (aged 23)
9.	Alireza Nadi	2 September 1980 (aged 26)
10.	Behnam Mahmoudi	25 April 1980 (aged 26)
11.	Mohammad Torkashvand	25 January 1979 (aged 27)
14.	Mohammad Soleimani	23 September 1987 (aged 19)
17.	Mohammad Mohammadkazem	28 September 1985 (aged 21)
Coach	Milorad Kijac	

=== Italy ===
#NR	NAME	BIRTHDATE
1.	Luigi Mastrangelo	17 August 1975 (aged 31)
2.	Manuel Coscione	29 January 1980 (aged 26)
5.	Valerio Vermiglio	1 March 1976 (aged 30)
6.	Samuele Papi	20 May 1973 (aged 33)
8.	Alberto Cisolla	10 October 1977 (aged 29)
9.	Cristian Savani	22 February 1982 (aged 24)
12.	Mirko Corsano	28 October 1973 (aged 33)
14.	Alessandro Fei	29 November 1978 (aged 27)
15.	Andrea Semenzato	12 September 1981 (aged 25)
16.	Michal Lasko	11 March 1981 (aged 25)
18.	Matej Černič	13 September 1978 (aged 28)
Coach	Gianpaolo Montali	

=== Japan ===
#NR	NAME	BIRTHDATE
1.	Nobuharu Saito	29 September 1973 (aged 33)
3.	Shinya Chiba	5 December 1977 (aged 28)
4.	Kenji Onoue	12 May 1978 (aged 28)
6.	Ryuji Naohiro	1 October 1978 (aged 28)
7.	Takahiro Yamamoto	12 July 1978 (aged 28)
8.	Masaji Ogino	8 January 1970 (aged 36)
12.	Kota Yamamura	20 October 1980 (aged 26)
15.	Katsutoshi Tsumagari	2 November 1975 (aged 31)
16.	Yusuke Ishijima	9 January 1984 (aged 22)
17.	Yu Koshikawa	30 June 1984 (aged 22)
18.	Kosuke Tomonaga	22 July 1980 (aged 26)
Coach	Tatsuya Ueta	

=== Kazakhstan ===
#NR	NAME	BIRTHDATE
2.	Yevgeniy Senatorov	1 May 1979 (aged 27)
3.	Anton Yudin	13 May 1982 (aged 24)
4.	Yevgeniy Andreyev	4 April 1974 (aged 32)
7.	Dmitriy Gorbatkov	21 September 1981 (aged 25)
8.	Sergey Trikoz	30 March 1978 (aged 28)
9.	Marat Imangaliyev	17 March 1980 (aged 26)
10.	Alexey Stepanov	29 May 1978 (aged 28)
11.	Vladimir Derevyanko	21 January 1971 (aged 35)
12.	Denis Zhukov	9 April 1976 (aged 30)
14.	Anton Rubtsov	26 October 1981 (aged 25)
15.	Svyatoslav Miklashevich	6 August 1978 (aged 28)
16.	Kirill Konovalov	20 October 1979 (aged 27)
Coach	Vladimir Kondra	

=== Poland ===
#NR	NAME	BIRTHDATE
2.	Michał Winiarski	28 September 1983 (aged 23)
3.	Piotr Gruszka	8 March 1977 (aged 29)
4.	Daniel Pliński	10 December 1978 (aged 27)
5.	Paweł Zagumny	18 October 1977 (aged 29)
7.	Wojciech Grzyb	4 January 1981 (aged 25)
9.	Łukasz Żygadło	2 August 1979 (aged 27)
10.	Mariusz Wlazły	4 August 1983 (aged 23)
11.	Łukasz Kadziewicz	20 September 1980 (aged 26)
12.	Grzegorz Szymański	12 July 1978 (aged 28)
13.	Sebastian Świderski	26 June 1977 (aged 29)
15.	Piotr Gacek	16 September 1978 (aged 28)
17.	Michał Bąkiewicz	22 March 1981 (aged 25)
Coach	Raúl Lozano	3 September 1956 (aged 50)

=== Puerto Rico ===
#NR	NAME	BIRTHDATE
1.	José Rivera	2 July 1977 (aged 29)
2.	Gregory Berrios	24 January 1979 (aged 27)
4.	Víctor Rivera	30 August 1976 (aged 30)
5.	José Quiñones	20 February 1979 (aged 27)
6.	Ángel Pérez	20 May 1982 (aged 24)
8.	René Esteves	25 November 1977 (aged 28)
9.	Luis Rodríguez	13 July 1969 (aged 37)
10.	Víctor Bird	16 March 1982 (aged 24)
11.	Roberto Muñiz	11 June 1980 (aged 26)
12.	Héctor Soto	20 June 1978 (aged 28)
13.	Alexis Matias	21 July 1974 (aged 32)
16.	Enrique Escalante	6 August 1984 (aged 22)
Coach	Carlos Cardona	

=== Russia ===
#NR	NAME	BIRTHDATE
1.	Alexander Korneev	11 September 1980 (aged 26)
3.	Alexander Volkov	14 February 1985 (aged 21)
4.	Stanislav Dineykin	10 October 1973 (aged 33)
5.	Pavel Abramov	23 April 1979 (aged 27)
6.	Serguei Grankine	21 January 1985 (aged 21)
7.	Alexei Kazakov	18 March 1976 (aged 30)
9.	Semen Poltavsky	8 February 1981 (aged 25)
15.	Yuriy Berezhko	27 January 1984 (aged 22)
16.	Alexey Verbov	31 January 1982 (aged 24)
17.	Sergei Makarov	28 March 1980 (aged 26)
18.	Alexey Kuleshov	24 February 1979 (aged 27)
Coach	Zoran Gajić	

=== Serbia and Montenegro ===
#NR	NAME	BIRTHDATE
2.	Dejan Bojović	3 April 1983 (aged 23)
6.	Slobodan Boškan	18 August 1975 (aged 31)
8.	Marko Samardzic	22 February 1983 (aged 23)
9.	Nikola Grbić	6 September 1973 (aged 33)
10.	Vladimir Grbić	14 December 1970 (aged 35)
11.	Novica Bjelica	9 February 1983 (aged 23)
12.	Andrija Gerić	24 January 1977 (aged 29)
13.	Goran Vujević	27 February 1973 (aged 33)
14.	Ivan Miljković	13 September 1979 (aged 27)
15.	Veljko Petković	23 January 1977 (aged 29)
16.	Milos Nikić	31 March 1986 (aged 20)
18.	Marko Podraščanin	29 August 1987 (aged 19)
Coach	Igor Kolaković	

=== South Korea ===
#NR	NAME	BIRTHDATE
1.	Shin Jin-Sik	1 February 1975 (aged 31)
3.	Kwon Young-Min	5 July 1980 (aged 26)
4.	Moon Sung-Min	14 September 1986 (aged 20)
5.	Yeo Oh-Hyun	2 September 1978 (aged 28)
6.	Song Byung-Il	3 April 1983 (aged 23)
7.	Lee Sun-Kyu	14 March 1981 (aged 25)
9.	Who In-Jung	19 April 1974 (aged 32)
10.	Yun Bong-Woo	20 January 1982 (aged 24)
11.	Lee Kyung-Soo	27 April 1979 (aged 27)
12.	Kim Yo-han	16 August 1985 (aged 21)
16.	Ha Kyoung-Min	27 July 1982 (aged 24)
18.	Chang Byung-Chul	15 August 1976 (aged 30)
Coach	Kim Ho-Chul	

=== Tunisia ===
#NR	NAME	BIRTHDATE
2.	Mohamed Trabelsi	15 September 1981 (aged 25)
3.	Skander Ben Tara	22 January 1985 (aged 21)
5.	Samir Sellami	13 July 1977 (aged 29)
6.	Aymen Ben Brik	8 May 1985 (aged 21)
7.	Chaker Ghezal	14 January 1977 (aged 29)
9.	Khaled Belaïd	30 December 1973 (aged 32)
10.	Walid Ben Abbes	19 June 1980 (aged 26)
13.	Noureddine Hfaiedh	27 August 1973 (aged 33)
15.	Ghazi Guidara	18 May 1974 (aged 32)
16.	Hichem Kaabi	3 September 1986 (aged 20)
17.	Amine Besrour	5 December 1978 (aged 27)
18.	Hosni Karamosly	1 June 1980 (aged 26)
Coach	Antonio Giacobbe	

=== United States ===
#NR	NAME	BIRTHDATE
1.	Kyrt Ellis	14 September 1987 (aged 19)
2.	James Polster	8 February 1979 (aged 27)
5.	Richard Lambourne	6 May 1975 (aged 31)
6.	Phillip Eatherton	2 January 1974 (aged 32)
8.	William Priddy	1 October 1977 (aged 29)
9.	Ryan Millar	22 January 1978 (aged 28)
10.	Riley Salmon	2 July 1976 (aged 30)
12.	Thomas Hoff	9 June 1973 (aged 33)
13.	Clayton Stanley	20 January 1978 (aged 28)
15.	Gabriel Gardner	18 March 1976 (aged 30)
16.	David McKienzie	5 July 1979 (aged 27)
18.	Richard Taliaferro	28 September 1977 (aged 29)
Coach	Hugh McCutcheon	13 October 1969 (aged 37)

=== Venezuela ===
#NR	NAME	BIRTHDATE
2.	Ismel Ramos	18 April 1985 (aged 21)
4.	Joel Silva	14 September 1985 (aged 21)
6.	Carlos Luna	25 January 1981 (aged 25)
7.	Luis Díaz	20 August 1983 (aged 23)
10.	Renzo Sánchez	13 February 1985 (aged 21)
11.	Ernardo Gómez	30 July 1982 (aged 24)
12.	Carlos Tejeda	29 July 1980 (aged 26)
13.	Iván Márquez	4 October 1981 (aged 25)
14.	Thomas Ereu	25 October 1979 (aged 27)
15.	Francisco Soteldo	23 March 1986 (aged 20)
17.	Juan Carlos Blanco	27 July 1981 (aged 25)
18.	Fredy Cedeño	10 September 1981 (aged 25)
Coach	Eliseo Ramos	
