= 2009 FIVB Volleyball World League squads =

This article show all participating team squads at the 2009 FIVB Volleyball World League, played by 16 countries.

== Argentina ==
The following is the roster in the 2009 FIVB Volleyball World League.

No.	Name	Date of birth	Height	Weight	Spike	Block	2009 club
1	Gabriel Arroyo	3 March 1977	194 cm (6 ft 4 in)	95 kg (209 lb)	352 cm (139 in)	327 cm (129 in)	Ciudad de Bolivar Club
2	Javier Filardi	7 February 1980	190 cm (6 ft 3 in)	89 kg (196 lb)	340 cm (130 in)	318 cm (125 in)	UPCN San Juan Volley
3	Martín Blanco Costa	16 December 1985	202 cm (6 ft 8 in)	98 kg (216 lb)	346 cm (136 in)	334 cm (131 in)	UPCN San Juan Voley
4	Lucas Ocampo	20 March 1986	196 cm (6 ft 5 in)	100 kg (220 lb)	335 cm (132 in)	318 cm (125 in)	Lomas Volley
5	Nicolás Uriarte	21 March 1990	192 cm (6 ft 4 in)	82 kg (181 lb)	346 cm (136 in)	326 cm (128 in)	PGE Skra Belchatow
6	Gustavo Scholtis	16 December 1982	206 cm (6 ft 9 in)	87 kg (192 lb)	358 cm (141 in)	338 cm (133 in)	La Unión de Formosa Club
7	Gustavo Federico Porporatto	7 May 1981	199 cm (6 ft 6 in)	94 kg (207 lb)	365 cm (144 in)	260 cm (100 in)	La Union de Formosa
8	Demián González	21 February 1983	192 cm (6 ft 4 in)	81 kg (179 lb)	328 cm (129 in)	318 cm (125 in)	Brazil Kirin Club
9	Rodrigo Quiroga	23 March 1987	190 cm (6 ft 3 in)	86 kg (190 lb)	345 cm (136 in)	321 cm (126 in)	Vôlei Canoas
10	Alejandro Spajic	26 April 1976	204 cm (6 ft 8 in)	95 kg (209 lb)	360 cm (140 in)	340 cm (130 in)	UPCN San Juan Voley
11	Facundo Conte	25 August 1989	198 cm (6 ft 6 in)	90 kg (200 lb)	355 cm (140 in)	326 cm (128 in)	PGE Skra Belchatow
12	Leandro Martín Concina	4 November 1984	196 cm (6 ft 5 in)	94 kg (207 lb)	340 cm (130 in)	320 cm (130 in)	Gioia del Colle - ITA
13	Federico Pereyra	19 June 1988	200 cm (6 ft 7 in)	99 kg (218 lb)	335 cm (132 in)	325 cm (128 in)	Nolio Maaseik Club
14	Guillermo García	21 September 1983	193 cm (6 ft 4 in)	92 kg (203 lb)	352 cm (139 in)	340 cm (130 in)	Ciudad de Bolívar
15	Luciano De Cecco	2 June 1988	194 cm (6 ft 4 in)	89 kg (196 lb)	333 cm (131 in)	315 cm (124 in)	Sir Safety Perugia
16	Alexis González	21 July 1981	184 cm (6 ft 0 in)	83 kg (183 lb)	321 cm (126 in)	300 cm (120 in)	Ciudad de Bolivar
17	Pablo Meana	10 June 1975	187 cm (6 ft 2 in)	87 kg (192 lb)	325 cm (128 in)	315 cm (124 in)	Drean Bolivar - ARG
18	Lucas Chávez	3 April 1982	199 cm (6 ft 6 in)	95 kg (209 lb)	335 cm (132 in)	318 cm (125 in)	Guaynabo Mets - PTR

== Brazil ==
The following is the roster in the 2009 FIVB Volleyball World League.

No.	Name	Date of birth	Height	Weight	Spike	Block	2009 club
1	Bruno Rezende	2 July 1986	190 cm (6 ft 3 in)	76 kg (168 lb)	323 cm (127 in)	302 cm (119 in)	RJX
2	Raphael Vieira De Oliveira	14 June 1979	190 cm (6 ft 3 in)	82 kg (181 lb)	330 cm (130 in)	306 cm (120 in)	Taubaté Funvic
3	Eder Carbonera	19 October 1983	204 cm (6 ft 8 in)	101 kg (223 lb)	350 cm (140 in)	330 cm (130 in)	Sada Cruzeiro Volei
4	Leandro Araújo da Silva	17 December 1983	205 cm (6 ft 9 in)	94 kg (207 lb)	354 cm (139 in)	330 cm (130 in)	Sada Cruzeiro
5	Sidnei Santos	9 July 1982	203 cm (6 ft 8 in)	98 kg (216 lb)	344 cm (135 in)	318 cm (125 in)	Taubaté Funvic
6	Leandro Vissotto Neves	30 April 1983	212 cm (6 ft 11 in)	108 kg (238 lb)	370 cm (150 in)	345 cm (136 in)	JT Thunders
7	Gilberto Godoy Filho	23 December 1976	192 cm (6 ft 4 in)	85 kg (187 lb)	325 cm (128 in)	312 cm (123 in)	Cimed/Sky
8	Murilo Endres	3 May 1981	190 cm (6 ft 3 in)	76 kg (168 lb)	343 cm (135 in)	319 cm (126 in)	SESI
9	Leonardo Miranda	10 March 1982	198 cm (6 ft 6 in)	93 kg (205 lb)	315 cm (124 in)	303 cm (119 in)	SESI
10	Sérgio Dutra Santos	15 October 1975	184 cm (6 ft 0 in)	78 kg (172 lb)	325 cm (128 in)	310 cm (120 in)	SESI
11	Thiago Soares Alves	26 July 1986	194 cm (6 ft 4 in)	88 kg (194 lb)	330 cm (130 in)	308 cm (121 in)	RJX
12	Joao Paulo Tavares	30 March 1983	205 cm (6 ft 9 in)	95 kg (209 lb)	332 cm (131 in)	327 cm (129 in)	CIMED SKY
13	Tiago Barth	13 June 1988	209 cm (6 ft 10 in)	87 kg (192 lb)	360 cm (140 in)	330 cm (130 in)	SESI
14	Rodrigo Santana	17 April 1979	205 cm (6 ft 9 in)	85 kg (187 lb)	350 cm (140 in)	328 cm (129 in)	Al-Rayyan
15	Rodrigo Pinto	20 February 1980	202 cm (6 ft 8 in)	98 kg (216 lb)	328 cm (129 in)	318 cm (125 in)	Pineto
16	Lucas Saatkamp	6 March 1986	209 cm (6 ft 10 in)	101 kg (223 lb)	340 cm (130 in)	321 cm (126 in)	SESI
17	Marlon Yared	27 July 1977	190 cm (6 ft 3 in)	80 kg (180 lb)	315 cm (124 in)	304 cm (120 in)	VIVO/MINAS
18	João Paulo Bravo	7 January 1979	190 cm (6 ft 3 in)	87 kg (192 lb)	340 cm (130 in)	320 cm (130 in)	Arkas Spor Kulubu
19	Mário Pedreira Júnior	3 May 1982	192 cm (6 ft 4 in)	91 kg (201 lb)	330 cm (130 in)	321 cm (126 in)	Volley Piacenza

== Bulgaria ==
The following is the roster in the 2009 FIVB Volleyball World League.

No.	Name	Date of birth	Height	Weight	Spike	Block	2009 club
1	Georgi Bratoev	21 October 1987	203 cm (6 ft 8 in)	96 kg (212 lb)	340 cm (130 in)	325 cm (128 in)	Lokomotiv Kharkiv
2	Hristo Tsvetanov	29 March 1978	198 cm (6 ft 6 in)	85 kg (187 lb)	345 cm (136 in)	330 cm (130 in)	ASUL Lyon
3	Andrey Zhekov	12 March 1980	190 cm (6 ft 3 in)	82 kg (181 lb)	340 cm (130 in)	326 cm (128 in)	Tomis
4	Vladislav Ivanov	14 March 1987	188 cm (6 ft 2 in)	80 kg (180 lb)	320 cm (130 in)	310 cm (120 in)	ASU Lyon
5	Krasimir Gaydarski	23 February 1983	204 cm (6 ft 8 in)	96 kg (212 lb)	350 cm (140 in)	330 cm (130 in)	SCC Berlin
6	Matey Kaziyski	23 September 1984	203 cm (6 ft 8 in)	93 kg (205 lb)	370 cm (150 in)	335 cm (132 in)	Al-Rayyan Sports Club
7	Miroslav Gradinarov	10 February 1985	203 cm (6 ft 8 in)	91 kg (201 lb)	350 cm (140 in)	330 cm (130 in)	TOAC TUC Toulouse
8	Svetozar Ivanov	28 October 1977	208 cm (6 ft 10 in)	100 kg (220 lb)	347 cm (137 in)	336 cm (132 in)	CSKA
9	Metodi Ananiev	17 February 1986	203 cm (6 ft 8 in)	100 kg (220 lb)	363 cm (143 in)	345 cm (136 in)	Indykpol AZS UWM
10	Danail Milushev	3 February 1984	200 cm (6 ft 7 in)	102 kg (225 lb)	360 cm (140 in)	340 cm (130 in)	F.C.Tokyo
11	Vladimir Nikolov	3 October 1977	200 cm (6 ft 7 in)	95 kg (209 lb)	345 cm (136 in)	325 cm (128 in)	ASU Lyon
12	Teodor Bogdanov	29 January 1986	207 cm (6 ft 9 in)	90 kg (200 lb)	360 cm (140 in)	340 cm (130 in)	Levski Siconco
13	Teodor Salparov	16 August 1982	187 cm (6 ft 2 in)	77 kg (170 lb)	320 cm (130 in)	305 cm (120 in)	Zenit
14	Stoyko Nenchev	25 November 1984	200 cm (6 ft 7 in)	92 kg (203 lb)	345 cm (136 in)	320 cm (130 in)	CSKA
15	Todor Aleksiev	21 April 1983	204 cm (6 ft 8 in)	105 kg (231 lb)	355 cm (140 in)	340 cm (130 in)	Gazprom - Ugra Surgut
16	Martin Penev	29 February 1984	194 cm (6 ft 4 in)	95 kg (209 lb)	338 cm (133 in)	315 cm (124 in)	Lokomotiv - Izumrud
17	Plamen Konstantinov	14 June 1973	202 cm (6 ft 8 in)	93 kg (205 lb)	350 cm (140 in)	330 cm (130 in)	Iraklis THESSALONIKI
18	Ivan Zarev	25 June 1986	199 cm (6 ft 6 in)	87 kg (192 lb)	341 cm (134 in)	328 cm (129 in)	CSKA
19	Tsvetan Sokolov	31 December 1989	205 cm (6 ft 9 in)	100 kg (220 lb)	337 cm (133 in)	319 cm (126 in)	Marek Union Ivkoni

== China ==
The following is the roster in the 2009 FIVB Volleyball World League.

No.	Name	Date of birth	Height	Weight	Spike	Block	2009 club
1	Bian Hongmin	22 September 1989	210 cm (6 ft 11 in)	95 kg (209 lb)	355 cm (140 in)	330 cm (130 in)	Zhejiang
2	Ji Zhe	25 October 1986	200 cm (6 ft 7 in)	90 kg (200 lb)	347 cm (137 in)	341 cm (134 in)	Henan
3	Dai Qingyao	26 September 1991	205 cm (6 ft 9 in)	100 kg (220 lb)	350 cm (140 in)	340 cm (130 in)	Shanghai
4	Zhang Chen	28 June 1985	200 cm (6 ft 7 in)	89 kg (196 lb)	356 cm (140 in)	340 cm (130 in)	Jiangsu
5	Guo Peng	1 July 1982	200 cm (6 ft 7 in)	84 kg (185 lb)	360 cm (140 in)	337 cm (133 in)	Army
6	Liang Chunlong	25 March 1988	206 cm (6 ft 9 in)	91 kg (201 lb)	351 cm (138 in)	333 cm (131 in)	Liaoning
7	Zhong Weijun	20 April 1989	200 cm (6 ft 7 in)	88 kg (194 lb)	347 cm (137 in)	335 cm (132 in)	Army
8	Cui Jianjun	1 August 1985	192 cm (6 ft 4 in)	94 kg (207 lb)	350 cm (140 in)	335 cm (132 in)	Henan
9	Jiao Shuai	28 January 1984	194 cm (6 ft 4 in)	75 kg (165 lb)	350 cm (140 in)	341 cm (134 in)	Henan
10	Ping Chen	1 September 1989	195 cm (6 ft 5 in)	78 kg (172 lb)	352 cm (139 in)	335 cm (132 in)	Jiangsu
11	Yu Dawei	21 June 1984	199 cm (6 ft 6 in)	90 kg (200 lb)	345 cm (136 in)	335 cm (132 in)	Shandong
12	Shen Qiong	5 September 1981	198 cm (6 ft 6 in)	84 kg (185 lb)	359 cm (141 in)	349 cm (137 in)	Shanghai
13	Jiang Kun	3 December 1985	197 cm (6 ft 6 in)	90 kg (200 lb)	340 cm (130 in)	330 cm (130 in)	Sichuan
14	Gao Qi	30 December 1982	196 cm (6 ft 5 in)	85 kg (187 lb)	358 cm (141 in)	345 cm (136 in)	Hubei
15	Li Runming	1 March 1990	198 cm (6 ft 6 in)	93 kg (205 lb)	350 cm (140 in)	326 cm (128 in)	Shandong
16	Ren Qi	24 February 1984	174 cm (5 ft 9 in)	70 kg (150 lb)	322 cm (127 in)	312 cm (123 in)	Shanghai
17	Ding Hui	24 June 1989	185 cm (6 ft 1 in)	80 kg (180 lb)	330 cm (130 in)	320 cm (130 in)	Zhejiang
18	Fang Yingchao	3 August 1982	198 cm (6 ft 6 in)	79 kg (174 lb)	360 cm (140 in)	350 cm (140 in)	Shanghai

== Cuba ==
The following is the roster in the 2009 FIVB Volleyball World League.

No.	Name	Date of birth	Height	Weight	Spike	Block	2009 club
1	Wilfredo Leon Venero	31 July 1993	202 cm (6 ft 8 in)	96 kg (212 lb)	350 cm (140 in)	346 cm (136 in)	Santiago de Cuba
2	Lian Sem Estrada Jova	12 December 1982	196 cm (6 ft 5 in)	83 kg (183 lb)	339 cm (133 in)	335 cm (132 in)	Santiago de Cuba
3	Gustavo Leyva Alvarez	14 December 1985	180 cm (5 ft 11 in)	75 kg (165 lb)	305 cm (120 in)	300 cm (120 in)	Ciudad Habana
4	Yoandy Leal Hidalgo	31 August 1988	201 cm (6 ft 7 in)	84 kg (185 lb)	361 cm (142 in)	348 cm (137 in)	Sada Cruzeiro Volei
5	Miguel Angel Dalmau	21 September 1984	197 cm (6 ft 6 in)	83 kg (183 lb)	353 cm (139 in)	330 cm (130 in)	Villa Clara
6	Keibel Gutierrez Torna	6 May 1987	178 cm (5 ft 10 in)	80 kg (180 lb)	305 cm (120 in)	295 cm (116 in)	Villa Clara
7	Osmany Roberto Camejo Durruthy	18 February 1983	202 cm (6 ft 8 in)	90 kg (200 lb)	350 cm (140 in)	330 cm (130 in)	Ciudad Habana
8	Rolando Cepeda Abreu	13 March 1989	198 cm (6 ft 6 in)	77 kg (170 lb)	359 cm (141 in)	344 cm (135 in)	S.Spiritus
9	Michael Sánchez Bozhulev	5 June 1986	206 cm (6 ft 9 in)	100 kg (220 lb)	365 cm (144 in)	340 cm (130 in)	Al-Rayyan Sports Club
10	David De La Torre Morell	15 February 1986	200 cm (6 ft 7 in)	86 kg (190 lb)	350 cm (140 in)	332 cm (131 in)	Santiago De Cuba
11	Gonzalez Raidel Delgado	8 September 1987	195 cm (6 ft 5 in)	81 kg (179 lb)	347 cm (137 in)	330 cm (130 in)	La Habana
12	Yenry Bell Cisnero	27 July 1981	188 cm (6 ft 2 in)	84 kg (185 lb)	358 cm (141 in)	328 cm (129 in)	Santiago de Cuba
13	Robertlandy Simón Aties	11 June 1987	206 cm (6 ft 9 in)	91 kg (201 lb)	358 cm (141 in)	326 cm (128 in)	Al-Rayyan Sports Club
14	Raydel Hierrezuelo Aguirre	14 July 1987	196 cm (6 ft 5 in)	87 kg (192 lb)	340 cm (130 in)	335 cm (132 in)	Ciudad Habana
15	Darienn Ferrer Delis	31 October 1982	204 cm (6 ft 8 in)	84 kg (185 lb)	362 cm (143 in)	346 cm (136 in)	Santiago de Cuba
16	Leonardo Leyva Martinez	23 March 1990	206 cm (6 ft 9 in)	73 kg (161 lb)	249 cm (98 in)	339 cm (133 in)	Ciudad de la Habana
17	Odelvis Dominico Speck	6 May 1977	205 cm (6 ft 9 in)	87 kg (192 lb)	360 cm (140 in)	356 cm (140 in)	Ciudad Habana
18	Yosmany Díaz Carmenate	8 January 1988	196 cm (6 ft 5 in)	89 kg (196 lb)	358 cm (141 in)	328 cm (129 in)	Ciudad Habana
19	Fernando Hernandez Ramos	11 September 1989	196 cm (6 ft 5 in)	78 kg (172 lb)	358 cm (141 in)	339 cm (133 in)	C.Habana

== Finland ==
The following is the roster in the 2009 FIVB Volleyball World League.

No.	Name	Date of birth	Height	Weight	Spike	Block	2009 club
1	Jesse Mäntylä	24 March 1987	176 cm (5 ft 9 in)	70 kg (150 lb)	321 cm (126 in)	289 cm (114 in)	Hurrikaani-Loimaa (FIN)
2	Joni Markkula	10 February 1983	192 cm (6 ft 4 in)	84 kg (185 lb)	330 cm (130 in)	311 cm (122 in)	Vammalan Lentopallo (FIN)
3	Mikko Esko	3 September 1978	198 cm (6 ft 6 in)	89 kg (196 lb)	331 cm (130 in)	319 cm (126 in)	Nizhni Novgorod (RUS)
4	Olli-Pekka Ojansivu	31 December 1987	197 cm (6 ft 6 in)	90 kg (200 lb)	344 cm (135 in)	325 cm (128 in)	Kokkolan Tiikerit (FIN)
5	Antti Siltala	14 March 1984	193 cm (6 ft 4 in)	90 kg (200 lb)	348 cm (137 in)	330 cm (130 in)	Jenisei Krasnojarsk (RUS)
6	Tuomas Sammelvuo	16 February 1976	192 cm (6 ft 4 in)	90 kg (200 lb)	341 cm (134 in)	315 cm (124 in)	San Giustino (ITA)
7	Matti Hietanen	3 January 1983	199 cm (6 ft 6 in)	93 kg (205 lb)	350 cm (140 in)	320 cm (130 in)	Gdansk (POL)
8	Jari Tuominen	11 September 1986	200 cm (6 ft 7 in)	89 kg (196 lb)	345 cm (136 in)	320 cm (130 in)	Cantún (ITA)
9	Kalle Määttä	4 October 1984	191 cm (6 ft 3 in)	78 kg (172 lb)	328 cm (129 in)	310 cm (120 in)	Team Lakkapää (FIN)
10	Joni Mikkonen	13 June 1986	194 cm (6 ft 4 in)	86 kg (190 lb)	348 cm (137 in)	320 cm (130 in)	Saimaa Volley (FIN)
11	Janne Heikkinen	11 April 1976	202 cm (6 ft 8 in)	102 kg (225 lb)	348 cm (137 in)	330 cm (130 in)	Belchatow (POL)
12	Olli Kunnari	2 February 1982	197 cm (6 ft 6 in)	85 kg (187 lb)	342 cm (135 in)	315 cm (124 in)	Vammalan Lentopallo (FIN)
13	Mikko Oivanen	26 May 1986	198 cm (6 ft 6 in)	92 kg (203 lb)	360 cm (140 in)	320 cm (130 in)	Czarni Radom (POL)
14	Konstantin Shumov	15 February 1985	205 cm (6 ft 9 in)	98 kg (216 lb)	351 cm (138 in)	331 cm (130 in)	Treia (ITA)
15	Matti Oivanen	26 May 1986	198 cm (6 ft 6 in)	90 kg (200 lb)	355 cm (140 in)	320 cm (130 in)	Hurrikaani-Loimaa (FIN)
16	Urpo Sivula	15 March 1988	195 cm (6 ft 5 in)	100 kg (220 lb)	350 cm (140 in)	330 cm (130 in)	Raision Loimu (FIN)
17	Anssi Vesanen	21 February 1980	201 cm (6 ft 7 in)	105 kg (231 lb)	360 cm (140 in)	326 cm (128 in)	Tampereen Isku-Volley (FIN)
18	Jukka Lehtonen	22 February 1982	197 cm (6 ft 6 in)	90 kg (200 lb)	346 cm (136 in)	325 cm (128 in)	LEKA Volley (FIN)
19	Pasi Hyvärinen	22 November 1987	184 cm (6 ft 0 in)	80 kg (180 lb)	320 cm (130 in)	300 cm (120 in)	KyKy-Betset (FIN)

== France ==
The following is the roster in the 2009 FIVB Volleyball World League.

No.	Name	Date of birth	Height	Weight	Spike	Block	2009 club
1	Yannick Bazin	18 June 1983	190 cm (6 ft 3 in)	95 kg (209 lb)	337 cm (133 in)	315 cm (124 in)	Galatazarai
2	Ludovic Castard	18 January 1983	197 cm (6 ft 6 in)	95 kg (209 lb)	348 cm (137 in)	325 cm (128 in)	AS Cannes
3	Gérald Hardy-Dessources	9 February 1983	197 cm (6 ft 6 in)	93 kg (205 lb)	360 cm (140 in)	335 cm (132 in)	Tours VB
4	Antonin Rouzier	18 August 1986	201 cm (6 ft 7 in)	100 kg (220 lb)	350 cm (140 in)	330 cm (130 in)	Ankara
5	Romain Vadeleux	12 February 1983	196 cm (6 ft 5 in)	100 kg (220 lb)	355 cm (140 in)	335 cm (132 in)	Lube Macerata
6	Jean-Philippe Sol	1 January 1986	198 cm (6 ft 6 in)	92 kg (203 lb)	345 cm (136 in)	325 cm (128 in)	Arago de Sète
7	Stéphane Antiga	3 February 1976	200 cm (6 ft 7 in)	94 kg (207 lb)	347 cm (137 in)	327 cm (129 in)	PGE Skra
8	Marien Moreau	25 October 1983	201 cm (6 ft 7 in)	100 kg (220 lb)	345 cm (136 in)	328 cm (129 in)	Munich
9	Guillaume Samica	28 September 1981	198 cm (6 ft 6 in)	88 kg (194 lb)	355 cm (140 in)	327 cm (129 in)	Zaksa
10	Jean-Stéphane Tolar	4 July 1984	199 cm (6 ft 6 in)	90 kg (200 lb)	330 cm (130 in)	309 cm (122 in)	Tourcoing VLM
11	Loïc Le Marrec	1 March 1977	190 cm (6 ft 3 in)	82 kg (181 lb)	330 cm (130 in)	312 cm (123 in)	Tours VB
12	Nicolas Marechal	4 March 1987	198 cm (6 ft 6 in)	93 kg (205 lb)	338 cm (133 in)	327 cm (129 in)	Skra Belchatov
13	Pierre Pujol	13 July 1984	186 cm (6 ft 1 in)	90 kg (200 lb)	335 cm (132 in)	315 cm (124 in)	AS Cannes
14	Loic Geiler	14 April 1984	198 cm (6 ft 6 in)	85 kg (187 lb)	352 cm (139 in)	328 cm (129 in)	AS Cannes
15	Baptiste Geiler	12 March 1987	198 cm (6 ft 6 in)	93 kg (205 lb)	335 cm (132 in)	318 cm (125 in)	Friedrichshafen
16	Emmanuel Ragondet	6 August 1987	191 cm (6 ft 3 in)	77 kg (170 lb)	338 cm (133 in)	320 cm (130 in)	Arago de Sète
17	Oliver Kieffer	27 August 1979	200 cm (6 ft 7 in)	85 kg (187 lb)	355 cm (140 in)	335 cm (132 in)	Stade Poitevin
18	Jean-François Exiga	9 March 1982	176 cm (5 ft 9 in)	75 kg (165 lb)	320 cm (130 in)	312 cm (123 in)	Tours VB
19	Edouard Rowlandson	20 July 1988	190 cm (6 ft 3 in)	89 kg (196 lb)	330 cm (130 in)	310 cm (120 in)	Arago de Sète

== Italy ==
The following is the roster in the 2009 FIVB Volleyball World League.

No.	Name	Date of birth	Height	Weight	Spike	Block	2009 club
1	Roberto Cazzaniga	28 October 1979	200 cm (6 ft 7 in)	85 kg (187 lb)	351 cm (138 in)	335 cm (132 in)	Samgas
2	Simone Parodi	16 June 1986	196 cm (6 ft 5 in)	82 kg (181 lb)	350 cm (140 in)	335 cm (132 in)	Volley Lube
3	Mauro Gavotto	16 April 1979	201 cm (6 ft 7 in)	88 kg (194 lb)	350 cm (140 in)	330 cm (130 in)	Acqua Paradiso
4	Loris Manià	27 January 1979	190 cm (6 ft 3 in)	76 kg (168 lb)	330 cm (130 in)	315 cm (124 in)	Trenkwalder
5	Valerio Vermiglio	1 March 1976	193 cm (6 ft 4 in)	85 kg (187 lb)	342 cm (135 in)	320 cm (130 in)	ZENIT Kazan
6	Davide Saitta	23 June 1987	187 cm (6 ft 2 in)	82 kg (181 lb)	333 cm (131 in)	321 cm (126 in)	Andreoli
7	Michal Lasko	11 March 1981	202 cm (6 ft 8 in)	104 kg (229 lb)	348 cm (137 in)	337 cm (133 in)	Jastrzebski Wegel
8	Alberto Cisolla	17 October 1977	197 cm (6 ft 6 in)	86 kg (190 lb)	355 cm (140 in)	340 cm (130 in)	Macerata
9	Matteo Martino	28 January 1987	197 cm (6 ft 6 in)	84 kg (185 lb)	340 cm (130 in)	322 cm (127 in)	Lube Banca Marche
10	Giacomo Sintini	16 January 1979	196 cm (6 ft 5 in)	85 kg (187 lb)	320 cm (130 in)	305 cm (120 in)	Trentino Volley
11	Cristian Savani	22 February 1982	195 cm (6 ft 5 in)	95 kg (209 lb)	354 cm (139 in)	335 cm (132 in)	Lube Banca Marche
12	Andrea Bari	5 March 1980	185 cm (6 ft 1 in)	81 kg (179 lb)	327 cm (129 in)	310 cm (120 in)	Trentino Diatec
13	Francesco Fortunato	23 July 1977	201 cm (6 ft 7 in)	96 kg (212 lb)	363 cm (143 in)	335 cm (132 in)	Bre Banca Lannutti
14	Dragan Travica	28 August 1986	200 cm (6 ft 7 in)	94 kg (207 lb)	335 cm (132 in)	320 cm (130 in)	Belogorie Belgorod
15	Emanuele Birarelli	8 February 1981	202 cm (6 ft 8 in)	95 kg (209 lb)	340 cm (130 in)	316 cm (124 in)	Sir Safety Umbria Volley
16	Rocco Barone	14 December 1987	201 cm (6 ft 7 in)	86 kg (190 lb)	346 cm (136 in)	327 cm (129 in)	Tonno Callipo
17	Andrea Sala	27 December 1978	202 cm (6 ft 8 in)	96 kg (212 lb)	359 cm (141 in)	340 cm (130 in)	Trentino Betclic
18	Matej Cernic	13 September 1978	192 cm (6 ft 4 in)	80 kg (180 lb)	354 cm (139 in)	335 cm (132 in)	Assecco Resovia
19	Ivan Zaytsev	2 October 1988	204 cm (6 ft 8 in)	100 kg (220 lb)	370 cm (150 in)	355 cm (140 in)	Acqua Paradiso

== Japan ==
The following is the roster in the 2009 FIVB Volleyball World League.

No.	Name	Date of birth	Height	Weight	Spike	Block	2009 club
1	Osamu Tanabe	10 April 1979	181 cm (5 ft 11 in)	73 kg (161 lb)	330 cm (130 in)	300 cm (120 in)	Toray Arrows
2	Yuta Abe	8 August 1981	191 cm (6 ft 3 in)	85 kg (187 lb)	342 cm (135 in)	320 cm (130 in)	Suntory Sunbirds
3	Kozo Takahashi	21 March 1982	188 cm (6 ft 2 in)	77 kg (170 lb)	328 cm (129 in)	318 cm (125 in)	Toyoda Gosei Trefuerza
4	Yusuke Matsuta	31 October 1982	200 cm (6 ft 7 in)	90 kg (200 lb)	345 cm (136 in)	340 cm (130 in)	Panasonic Panthers
5	Daisuke Usami	29 March 1979	184 cm (6 ft 0 in)	88 kg (194 lb)	320 cm (130 in)	310 cm (120 in)	Panasonic Panthers
6	Takeshi Kitajima	16 December 1982	195 cm (6 ft 5 in)	85 kg (187 lb)	346 cm (136 in)	330 cm (130 in)	Sakai Blazers
7	Yusuke Inoue	5 August 1983	173 cm (5 ft 8 in)	72 kg (159 lb)	315 cm (124 in)	300 cm (120 in)	Sakai Blazers
8	Kazuki Maeda	17 August 1983	186 cm (6 ft 1 in)	74 kg (163 lb)	336 cm (132 in)	323 cm (127 in)	FC Tokyo
9	Akira Ogawa	5 September 1983	189 cm (6 ft 2 in)	78 kg (172 lb)	345 cm (136 in)	330 cm (130 in)	JT Thunders
10	Takahisa Otake	12 June 1984	185 cm (6 ft 1 in)	70 kg (150 lb)	325 cm (128 in)	320 cm (130 in)	Panasonic Panthers
11	Yoshihiko Matsumoto	7 January 1981	193 cm (6 ft 4 in)	80 kg (180 lb)	340 cm (130 in)	330 cm (130 in)	Sakai Blazers
12	Kota Yamamura	20 October 1980	205 cm (6 ft 9 in)	95 kg (209 lb)	350 cm (140 in)	335 cm (132 in)	Suntory Sunbirds
13	Kunihiro Shimizu	11 August 1986	192 cm (6 ft 4 in)	97 kg (214 lb)	345 cm (136 in)	335 cm (132 in)	Panasonic Panthers
14	Tatsuya Fukuzawa	1 July 1986	189 cm (6 ft 2 in)	86 kg (190 lb)	355 cm (140 in)	345 cm (136 in)	Panasonic Panthers
15	Takaaki Tomimatsu	20 July 1984	192 cm (6 ft 4 in)	85 kg (187 lb)	350 cm (140 in)	330 cm (130 in)	Toray Arrows
16	Yusuke Ishijima	9 January 1984	197 cm (6 ft 6 in)	102 kg (225 lb)	345 cm (136 in)	335 cm (132 in)	Sakai Blazers
17	Yu Koshikawa	30 June 1984	189 cm (6 ft 2 in)	87 kg (192 lb)	340 cm (130 in)	320 cm (130 in)	JT Thunders
18	Yuta Yoneyama	29 August 1984	185 cm (6 ft 1 in)	85 kg (187 lb)	340 cm (130 in)	320 cm (130 in)	Toray Arrows
19	Shiro Furuta	29 January 1988	188 cm (6 ft 2 in)	88 kg (194 lb)	350 cm (140 in)	330 cm (130 in)	Hosei University

== South Korea ==
The following is the roster in the 2009 FIVB Volleyball World League.

No.	Name	Date of birth	Height	Weight	Spike	Block	2009 club
1	Lim Si-hyoung	29 March 1985	191 cm (6 ft 3 in)	80 kg (180 lb)	320 cm (130 in)	310 cm (120 in)	Hyundai Capital
2	Park Chul-woo	25 July 1985	198 cm (6 ft 6 in)	88 kg (194 lb)	332 cm (131 in)	319 cm (126 in)	Samsung Fire&Marine Insurance
3	Kwon Young-min	5 July 1980	190 cm (6 ft 3 in)	82 kg (181 lb)	315 cm (124 in)	309 cm (122 in)	Hyundai Capital Co.
4	Moon Sung-min	14 September 1986	198 cm (6 ft 6 in)	89 kg (196 lb)	329 cm (130 in)	321 cm (126 in)	Hyundai Capital Co.
5	Yeo Oh-hyun	2 September 1978	175 cm (5 ft 9 in)	70 kg (150 lb)	280 cm (110 in)	279 cm (110 in)	Hyundai Capital
6	Choi Tae-woong	9 April 1976	185 cm (6 ft 1 in)	80 kg (180 lb)	315 cm (124 in)	302 cm (119 in)	Hyundai Capital
7	Lee Sun-kyu	14 March 1981	199 cm (6 ft 6 in)	90 kg (200 lb)	325 cm (128 in)	320 cm (130 in)	Samsung Fire & Marine Insuranc
8	Ha Hyun-yong	9 May 1982	198 cm (6 ft 6 in)	88 kg (194 lb)	330 cm (130 in)	322 cm (127 in)	LIG Insurance
9	Shin Young-soo	1 July 1982	197 cm (6 ft 6 in)	90 kg (200 lb)	335 cm (132 in)	313 cm (123 in)	Korean Airlines co.
10	Yun Bong-woo	20 January 1982	199 cm (6 ft 6 in)	88 kg (194 lb)	332 cm (131 in)	320 cm (130 in)	Hyundai Capital co.
11	Kang Dong-jin	31 August 1983	192 cm (6 ft 4 in)	86 kg (190 lb)	322 cm (127 in)	311 cm (122 in)	Korean Airlines co.
12	Song Byung-il	3 April 1983	196 cm (6 ft 5 in)	85 kg (187 lb)	317 cm (125 in)	297 cm (117 in)	Woori Capital
13	Ko Hee-jin	13 July 1980	198 cm (6 ft 6 in)	91 kg (201 lb)	330 cm (130 in)	320 cm (130 in)	Samsung Fire&Marine Insurance
14	Kim Yo-han	16 August 1985	200 cm (6 ft 7 in)	95 kg (209 lb)	335 cm (132 in)	326 cm (128 in)	LIG Insurance
15	Han Sun-soo	16 December 1985	189 cm (6 ft 2 in)	80 kg (180 lb)	310 cm (120 in)	297 cm (117 in)	Korean Army
16	Kim Hak-min	4 September 1983	193 cm (6 ft 4 in)	81 kg (179 lb)	327 cm (129 in)	319 cm (126 in)	Korean Airlines Co.
17	Ha Kyoung-min	27 July 1982	201 cm (6 ft 7 in)	83 kg (183 lb)	320 cm (130 in)	310 cm (120 in)	Kepco 45
18	Shin Yung-suk	4 October 1986	198 cm (6 ft 6 in)	90 kg (200 lb)	335 cm (132 in)	325 cm (128 in)	Korean Army
19	Lee Kang-joo	30 June 1983	185 cm (6 ft 1 in)	75 kg (165 lb)	305 cm (120 in)	290 cm (110 in)	Samsung Fire&Marine Insurance

== Netherlands ==
The following is the roster in the 2009 FIVB Volleyball World League.

No.	Name	Date of birth	Height	Weight	Spike	Block	2009 club
1	Dennis Van Der Veen	19 February 1982	202 cm (6 ft 8 in)	100 kg (220 lb)	335 cm (132 in)	312 cm (123 in)	Paris Volley
2	Nico Freriks	22 December 1981	193 cm (6 ft 4 in)	87 kg (192 lb)	332 cm (131 in)	314 cm (124 in)	Paykan Tehran
3	Yannick Van Harskamp	2 April 1986	190 cm (6 ft 3 in)	88 kg (194 lb)	335 cm (132 in)	316 cm (124 in)	Topvolley Precura Antwerpen
4	Robert Horstink	26 December 1981	202 cm (6 ft 8 in)	96 kg (212 lb)	365 cm (144 in)	350 cm (140 in)	Sisley Treviso
5	Bart-Jan van der Mark	20 May 1985	207 cm (6 ft 9 in)	99 kg (218 lb)	342 cm (135 in)	316 cm (124 in)	Langhenkel Volley
6	Roland Rademaker	18 March 1982	192 cm (6 ft 4 in)	83 kg (183 lb)	325 cm (128 in)	317 cm (125 in)	Tourcoing
7	Richard Rademaker	18 March 1982	191 cm (6 ft 3 in)	80 kg (180 lb)	325 cm (128 in)	315 cm (124 in)	Zadkine Rotterdam.Nesselande
8	Kay Van Dijk	25 June 1984	214 cm (7 ft 0 in)	102 kg (225 lb)	365 cm (144 in)	355 cm (140 in)	Al-Ain
9	Jeroen Trommel	1 August 1980	194 cm (6 ft 4 in)	90 kg (200 lb)	340 cm (130 in)	310 cm (120 in)	IBB Spor
10	Jeroen Rauwerdink	13 September 1985	200 cm (6 ft 7 in)	92 kg (203 lb)	350 cm (140 in)	320 cm (130 in)	Ziraat Bankasi Ankara
11	Jan Willem Snippe	21 May 1986	200 cm (6 ft 7 in)	94 kg (207 lb)	356 cm (140 in)	340 cm (130 in)	Saint-Nazaire
12	Wytze Kooistra	3 June 1982	209 cm (6 ft 10 in)	102 kg (225 lb)	360 cm (140 in)	350 cm (140 in)	Olympiakos
13	Tije Vlam	9 October 1985	207 cm (6 ft 9 in)	102 kg (225 lb)	347 cm (137 in)	330 cm (130 in)	Al-Arabi
14	Niels Klapwijk	19 September 1985	200 cm (6 ft 7 in)	89 kg (196 lb)	350 cm (140 in)	320 cm (130 in)	Besiktas
15	Lars Lorsheijd	8 June 1985	200 cm (6 ft 7 in)	97 kg (214 lb)	357 cm (141 in)	350 cm (140 in)	Tourcoing
16	Dick Kooy	3 December 1987	202 cm (6 ft 8 in)	80 kg (180 lb)	360 cm (140 in)	340 cm (130 in)	Halkbank Ankara
17	Johannes Cornelius Bontje	12 May 1981	206 cm (6 ft 9 in)	98 kg (216 lb)	366 cm (144 in)	340 cm (130 in)	Noliko Maaseik
18	Jelte Maan	19 March 1986	190 cm (6 ft 3 in)	86 kg (190 lb)	343 cm (135 in)	330 cm (130 in)	Noliko Maaseik
19	Mathijs Mast	14 September 1984	200 cm (6 ft 7 in)	90 kg (200 lb)	340 cm (130 in)	330 cm (130 in)	SV Dynamo Volleybal

== Poland ==
The following is the roster in the 2009 FIVB Volleyball World League.

No.	Name	Date of birth	Height	Weight	Spike	Block	2009 club
1	Piotr Nowakowski	18 December 1987	205 cm (6 ft 9 in)	90 kg (200 lb)	355 cm (140 in)	340 cm (130 in)	Asseco Resovia
2	Grzegorz Lomacz	1 October 1987	187 cm (6 ft 2 in)	80 kg (180 lb)	335 cm (132 in)	315 cm (124 in)	Cuprum
3	Jakub Jarosz	10 February 1987	195 cm (6 ft 5 in)	84 kg (185 lb)	353 cm (139 in)	328 cm (129 in)	Transfer
4	Rafal Buszek	28 April 1987	194 cm (6 ft 4 in)	81 kg (179 lb)	345 cm (136 in)	327 cm (129 in)	ZAKSA
5	Pawel Zagumny	18 October 1977	200 cm (6 ft 7 in)	88 kg (194 lb)	336 cm (132 in)	317 cm (125 in)	ZAKSA
6	Bartosz Kurek	29 August 1988	205 cm (6 ft 9 in)	87 kg (192 lb)	352 cm (139 in)	326 cm (128 in)	Lube Banca Marche
7	Wojciech Grzyb	4 January 1981	205 cm (6 ft 9 in)	104 kg (229 lb)	360 cm (140 in)	340 cm (130 in)	LOTOS Trefl
8	Marcin Wika	9 November 1983	194 cm (6 ft 4 in)	86 kg (190 lb)	335 cm (132 in)	310 cm (120 in)	Asseco Resovia
9	Zbigniew Bartman	4 May 1987	198 cm (6 ft 6 in)	95 kg (209 lb)	352 cm (139 in)	320 cm (130 in)	Asseco Resovia
10	Marcel Gromadowski	19 December 1985	200 cm (6 ft 7 in)	94 kg (207 lb)	348 cm (137 in)	318 cm (125 in)	Paris Volley
11	Lukasz Kadziewicz	20 September 1980	206 cm (6 ft 9 in)	84 kg (185 lb)	360 cm (140 in)	335 cm (132 in)	Al-Arabi
12	Pawel Woicki	29 June 1983	183 cm (6 ft 0 in)	80 kg (180 lb)	330 cm (130 in)	305 cm (120 in)	Transfer Bydgoszcz
13	Karol Klos	8 August 1989	201 cm (6 ft 7 in)	87 kg (192 lb)	357 cm (141 in)	326 cm (128 in)	PGE Skra
14	Fabian Drzyzga	3 January 1990	196 cm (6 ft 5 in)	90 kg (200 lb)	325 cm (128 in)	304 cm (120 in)	Asseco Resovia
15	Michal Ruciak	22 August 1983	189 cm (6 ft 2 in)	75 kg (165 lb)	336 cm (132 in)	305 cm (120 in)	ZAKSA
16	Krzysztof Ignaczak	15 May 1978	188 cm (6 ft 2 in)	86 kg (190 lb)	330 cm (130 in)	315 cm (124 in)	Asseco Resovia
17	Michal Bakiewicz	22 March 1981	197 cm (6 ft 6 in)	92 kg (203 lb)	339 cm (133 in)	318 cm (125 in)	PGE Skra
18	Marcin Mozdzonek	9 February 1985	211 cm (6 ft 11 in)	93 kg (205 lb)	358 cm (141 in)	338 cm (133 in)	Halkbank
19	Pawel Zatorski	21 June 1990	184 cm (6 ft 0 in)	73 kg (161 lb)	328 cm (129 in)	304 cm (120 in)	ZAKSA

== Russia ==
The following is the roster in the 2009 FIVB Volleyball World League.

No.	Name	Date of birth	Height	Weight	Spike	Block	2009 club
1	Vladimir Melnik	21 July 1980	200 cm (6 ft 7 in)	95 kg (209 lb)	347 cm (137 in)	338 cm (133 in)	Ural
2	Semen Poltavskiy	8 February 1981	205 cm (6 ft 9 in)	89 kg (196 lb)	360 cm (140 in)	338 cm (133 in)	Yaroslavich
3	Evgeny Sivozhelez	6 August 1986	196 cm (6 ft 5 in)	90 kg (200 lb)	330 cm (130 in)	320 cm (130 in)	Zenit Kazan
4	Dmitriy Muserskiy	29 October 1988	218 cm (7 ft 2 in)	104 kg (229 lb)	375 cm (148 in)	347 cm (137 in)	Belogorie
5	Pavel Abramov	23 April 1979	200 cm (6 ft 7 in)	87 kg (192 lb)	347 cm (137 in)	336 cm (132 in)	Iskra
6	Sergey Grankin	21 January 1985	195 cm (6 ft 5 in)	96 kg (212 lb)	351 cm (138 in)	320 cm (130 in)	Dinamo
7	Alexey Kazakov	18 March 1976	217 cm (7 ft 1 in)	112 kg (247 lb)	358 cm (141 in)	344 cm (135 in)	Belogorie
8	Sergey Tetyukhin	23 September 1975	197 cm (6 ft 6 in)	89 kg (196 lb)	345 cm (136 in)	338 cm (133 in)	Belogorie
9	Alexey Cheremisin	23 September 1980	202 cm (6 ft 8 in)	98 kg (216 lb)	350 cm (140 in)	338 cm (133 in)	ZENIT Kazan
10	Yury Berezhko	27 January 1984	196 cm (6 ft 5 in)	93 kg (205 lb)	346 cm (136 in)	338 cm (133 in)	Dinamo
11	Oleg Samsonychev	22 March 1982	198 cm (6 ft 6 in)	96 kg (212 lb)	338 cm (133 in)	330 cm (130 in)	Iskra
12	Alexander Butko	18 March 1986	198 cm (6 ft 6 in)	97 kg (214 lb)	339 cm (133 in)	327 cm (129 in)	Lokomotiv
13	Denis Kalinin	28 April 1984	200 cm (6 ft 7 in)	86 kg (190 lb)	341 cm (134 in)	320 cm (130 in)	Iskra
14	Anton Astashenkov	27 October 1981	204 cm (6 ft 8 in)	105 kg (231 lb)	361 cm (142 in)	328 cm (129 in)	LOKOMOTIV NOVOSIBIRSK
15	Alexander Volkov	14 February 1985	210 cm (6 ft 11 in)	90 kg (200 lb)	360 cm (140 in)	335 cm (132 in)	ZENIT Kazan
16	Alexey Verbov	31 January 1982	183 cm (6 ft 0 in)	79 kg (174 lb)	315 cm (124 in)	310 cm (120 in)	ZENIT Kazan
17	Maxim Mikhaylov	19 March 1988	202 cm (6 ft 8 in)	103 kg (227 lb)	345 cm (136 in)	330 cm (130 in)	Zenit Kazan
18	Alexey Kuleshov	24 February 1979	206 cm (6 ft 9 in)	100 kg (220 lb)	353 cm (139 in)	344 cm (135 in)	Iskra
19	Alexander Yanutov	19 June 1983	195 cm (6 ft 5 in)	103 kg (227 lb)	335 cm (132 in)	315 cm (124 in)	Gazprom-Yugra

== Serbia ==
The following is the roster in the 2009 FIVB Volleyball World League.

No.	Name	Date of birth	Height	Weight	Spike	Block	2009 club
1	Nikola Kovacevic	14 February 1983	193 cm (6 ft 4 in)	78 kg (172 lb)	350 cm (140 in)	340 cm (130 in)	Calzedonia Verona (ITA)
2	Goran Maric	2 November 1981	204 cm (6 ft 8 in)	87 kg (192 lb)	344 cm (135 in)	327 cm (129 in)	Marmi Lanza Verona (ITA)
3	Novica Bjelica	9 February 1983	202 cm (6 ft 8 in)	97 kg (214 lb)	343 cm (135 in)	324 cm (128 in)	Copra Piacenza (ITA)
4	Bojan Janic	11 March 1982	198 cm (6 ft 6 in)	83 kg (183 lb)	345 cm (136 in)	322 cm (127 in)	Trefl Pilka Siatkowa (POL)
5	Vlado Petkovic	6 January 1983	198 cm (6 ft 6 in)	97 kg (214 lb)	325 cm (128 in)	318 cm (125 in)	Shahrdari Urmia SC (IRN)
6	Milos Terzic	13 June 1987	202 cm (6 ft 8 in)	88 kg (194 lb)	340 cm (130 in)	320 cm (130 in)	Tours Volleyball (FRA)
7	Dragan Stankovic	18 October 1985	205 cm (6 ft 9 in)	94 kg (207 lb)	343 cm (135 in)	333 cm (131 in)	Lube Banka Macerata (ITA)
8	Marko Samardzic	22 February 1983	190 cm (6 ft 3 in)	82 kg (181 lb)	326 cm (128 in)	310 cm (120 in)	Trefl Pilka Siatkowa (POL)
9	Nikola Grbic	6 September 1973	194 cm (6 ft 4 in)	91 kg (201 lb)	346 cm (136 in)	320 cm (130 in)	Itas Diatec Trentino (ITA)
10	Milos Nikic	31 March 1986	194 cm (6 ft 4 in)	79 kg (174 lb)	350 cm (140 in)	330 cm (130 in)	Gubernia Nizhniy Novgorod (RUS
11	Mihajlo Mitic	17 September 1990	201 cm (6 ft 7 in)	86 kg (190 lb)	335 cm (132 in)	320 cm (130 in)	Sir Safety Perugia (ITA)
12	Andrija Geric	24 January 1977	203 cm (6 ft 8 in)	101 kg (223 lb)	350 cm (140 in)	323 cm (127 in)	Panathinaikos (GRE)
13	Tomislav Dokic	27 February 1986	204 cm (6 ft 8 in)	97 kg (214 lb)	355 cm (140 in)	325 cm (128 in)	Foinikas SC Syros Isleand (GRE
14	Ivan Miljkovic	13 September 1979	206 cm (6 ft 9 in)	104 kg (229 lb)	354 cm (139 in)	333 cm (131 in)	Fenerbahce Istanbul (TUR)
15	Sasa Starovic	19 October 1988	207 cm (6 ft 9 in)	89 kg (196 lb)	335 cm (132 in)	321 cm (126 in)	Andreoli Latina (ITA)
16	Nemanja Petric	28 July 1987	202 cm (6 ft 8 in)	86 kg (190 lb)	333 cm (131 in)	320 cm (130 in)	Sir Safety Perugia (ITA)
17	Borislav Petrovic	6 January 1988	201 cm (6 ft 7 in)	96 kg (212 lb)	350 cm (140 in)	330 cm (130 in)	Stade Poitevin VB Pro (FRA)
18	Marko Podrascanin	29 August 1987	203 cm (6 ft 8 in)	100 kg (220 lb)	343 cm (135 in)	326 cm (128 in)	Lube Banka Macerata (ITA)
19	Nikola Rosic	5 August 1984	192 cm (6 ft 4 in)	85 kg (187 lb)	328 cm (129 in)	315 cm (124 in)	Energy Investments Lugano

== United States ==
The following is the roster in the 2009 FIVB Volleyball World League.

No.	Name	Date of birth	Height	Weight	Spike	Block	2009 club
1	Matthew Anderson	18 April 1987	202 cm (6 ft 8 in)	100 kg (220 lb)	360 cm (140 in)	332 cm (131 in)	Zenit Kazan
2	Sean Rooney	13 November 1982	206 cm (6 ft 9 in)	100 kg (220 lb)	354 cm (139 in)	336 cm (132 in)	Woori Card Hansae
3	Evan Patak	23 June 1984	201 cm (6 ft 7 in)	113 kg (249 lb)	363 cm (143 in)	330 cm (130 in)	Toulouse
4	David Lee	8 March 1982	203 cm (6 ft 8 in)	105 kg (231 lb)	350 cm (140 in)	325 cm (128 in)	Lokomotiv Nobosibirsk
5	Richard Lambourne	6 May 1975	190 cm (6 ft 3 in)	90 kg (200 lb)	324 cm (128 in)	312 cm (123 in)	USA Men's Volleyball Team
6	Paul Lotman	3 November 1985	200 cm (6 ft 7 in)	102 kg (225 lb)	336 cm (132 in)	312 cm (123 in)	Asseco Resovia
7	Donald Suxho	21 February 1976	196 cm (6 ft 5 in)	98 kg (216 lb)	337 cm (133 in)	319 cm (126 in)	Trentino Volley
8	Andrew Hein	1 July 1984	210 cm (6 ft 11 in)	105 kg (231 lb)	360 cm (140 in)	345 cm (136 in)	Toulouse OAC-TUC
9	Jonathan Winder	4 January 1986	203 cm (6 ft 8 in)	91 kg (201 lb)	340 cm (130 in)	306 cm (120 in)	Saems Tourcoing VB
10	David Smith	15 May 1985	201 cm (6 ft 7 in)	86 kg (190 lb)	348 cm (137 in)	314 cm (124 in)	Tours Volley-Ball
11	Brook Billings	30 April 1980	196 cm (6 ft 5 in)	95 kg (209 lb)	351 cm (138 in)	331 cm (130 in)	Fenerbahce
12	Thomas Hoff	9 June 1973	198 cm (6 ft 6 in)	94 kg (207 lb)	353 cm (139 in)	333 cm (131 in)	USA Men's Volleyball Team
13	Clayton Stanley	20 January 1978	205 cm (6 ft 9 in)	104 kg (229 lb)	357 cm (141 in)	332 cm (131 in)	Ural UFA
14	Kevin Hansen	19 March 1982	196 cm (6 ft 5 in)	93 kg (205 lb)	349 cm (137 in)	330 cm (130 in)	Arkas Spor
15	Russell Holmes	1 July 1982	205 cm (6 ft 9 in)	95 kg (209 lb)	352 cm (139 in)	335 cm (132 in)	Asseco Resovia
16	Jayson Jablonsky	23 July 1985	198 cm (6 ft 6 in)	91 kg (201 lb)	345 cm (136 in)	335 cm (132 in)	Fujian Men's Volleyball Club
17	Delano Thomas	26 January 1983	201 cm (6 ft 7 in)	95 kg (209 lb)	366 cm (144 in)	339 cm (133 in)	ACH Volley
18	Scott Touzinsky	22 April 1982	198 cm (6 ft 6 in)	88 kg (194 lb)	344 cm (135 in)	330 cm (130 in)	SCC Berlin
19	Alfredo Reft	15 December 1982	178 cm (5 ft 10 in)	83 kg (183 lb)	319 cm (126 in)	309 cm (122 in)	USA Men's Volleyball Team

== Venezuela ==
The following is the roster in the 2009 FIVB Volleyball World League.

No.	Name	Date of birth	Height	Weight	Spike	Block	2009 club
1	Angel Petit	18 February 1983	190 cm (6 ft 3 in)	75 kg (165 lb)	300 cm (120 in)	330 cm (130 in)	Almeria
2	Deivi Yustiz	15 June 1985	201 cm (6 ft 7 in)	78 kg (172 lb)	338 cm (133 in)	333 cm (131 in)	Yaracuy
3	Andy Agustin Rojas Guevara	2 October 1977	197 cm (6 ft 6 in)	95 kg (209 lb)	315 cm (124 in)	318 cm (125 in)	Unicaja Almeria
4	Joel Alexander Silva Pantoja	14 September 1985	189 cm (6 ft 2 in)	85 kg (187 lb)	330 cm (130 in)	325 cm (128 in)	BYU
5	Rodman Jose Valera Capon	20 April 1982	189 cm (6 ft 2 in)	82 kg (181 lb)	333 cm (131 in)	328 cm (129 in)	Compoktuna
6	Carlos Alberto Luna Contreras	25 January 1981	194 cm (6 ft 4 in)	85 kg (187 lb)	339 cm (133 in)	333 cm (131 in)	Toyoda
7	Luis Diaz	20 August 1983	205 cm (6 ft 9 in)	82 kg (181 lb)	343 cm (135 in)	337 cm (133 in)	Tonno Calippo
8	Ismel Antonio Ramos Valles	18 April 1985	195 cm (6 ft 5 in)	78 kg (172 lb)	341 cm (134 in)	336 cm (132 in)	Raision Loimu
9	Fernando Gonzalez	30 June 1989	194 cm (6 ft 4 in)	84 kg (185 lb)	333 cm (131 in)	328 cm (129 in)	Chubut Voley
10	Ronald Jose Mendez Garcia	26 October 1982	203 cm (6 ft 8 in)	84 kg (185 lb)	357 cm (141 in)	352 cm (139 in)	Bolivar
11	Ernardo Andres Gomez Canas	30 July 1982	195 cm (6 ft 5 in)	100 kg (220 lb)	355 cm (140 in)	350 cm (140 in)	Toyoda Gosei
12	Carlos Arturo Tejeda Rivera	28 July 1980	201 cm (6 ft 7 in)	88 kg (194 lb)	345 cm (136 in)	340 cm (130 in)	Almeria
13	Iván Márquez	4 October 1981	205 cm (6 ft 9 in)	90 kg (200 lb)	372 cm (146 in)	367 cm (144 in)	Pallavolo Pineto
14	Thomas Ereu	25 October 1979	192 cm (6 ft 4 in)	86 kg (190 lb)	340 cm (130 in)	335 cm (132 in)	Taviano
15	Francisco Soteldo	23 March 1986	200 cm (6 ft 7 in)	86 kg (190 lb)	347 cm (137 in)	341 cm (134 in)	Lara
16	Jesus Danian Chourio Pirela	2 January 1991	201 cm (6 ft 7 in)	88 kg (194 lb)	345 cm (136 in)	340 cm (130 in)	Zulia
17	Juan Carlos Blanco	31 July 1981	195 cm (6 ft 5 in)	83 kg (183 lb)	341 cm (134 in)	336 cm (132 in)	Karava
18	Fredy Ramon Cedeno Marquez	10 September 1981	205 cm (6 ft 9 in)	97 kg (214 lb)	358 cm (141 in)	335 cm (132 in)	Unicaja Almeria
19	Darwin Correa	5 July 1987	170 cm (5 ft 7 in)	71 kg (157 lb)	315 cm (124 in)	300 cm (120 in)	Vargas
