= Norbert Walter =

Norbert Walter may refer to:

- Norbert Walter (economist) (1944–2012), German economist
- Norbert Walter (volleyball) (born 1979), German volleyball player
