= Danyluk =

Danyluk is a surname. Notable people with the surname include:

- Andrea Danyluk (1963–2022), American computer scientist and computer science educator
- Anton Danyluk (born 1994), Scottish television personality
- Ray Danyluk (born 1952 or 1953), Canadian politician
- Terry Danyluk (born 1960), Canadian volleyball player
