= João Paulo Bravo =

Brazilian volleyball player (born 1979)

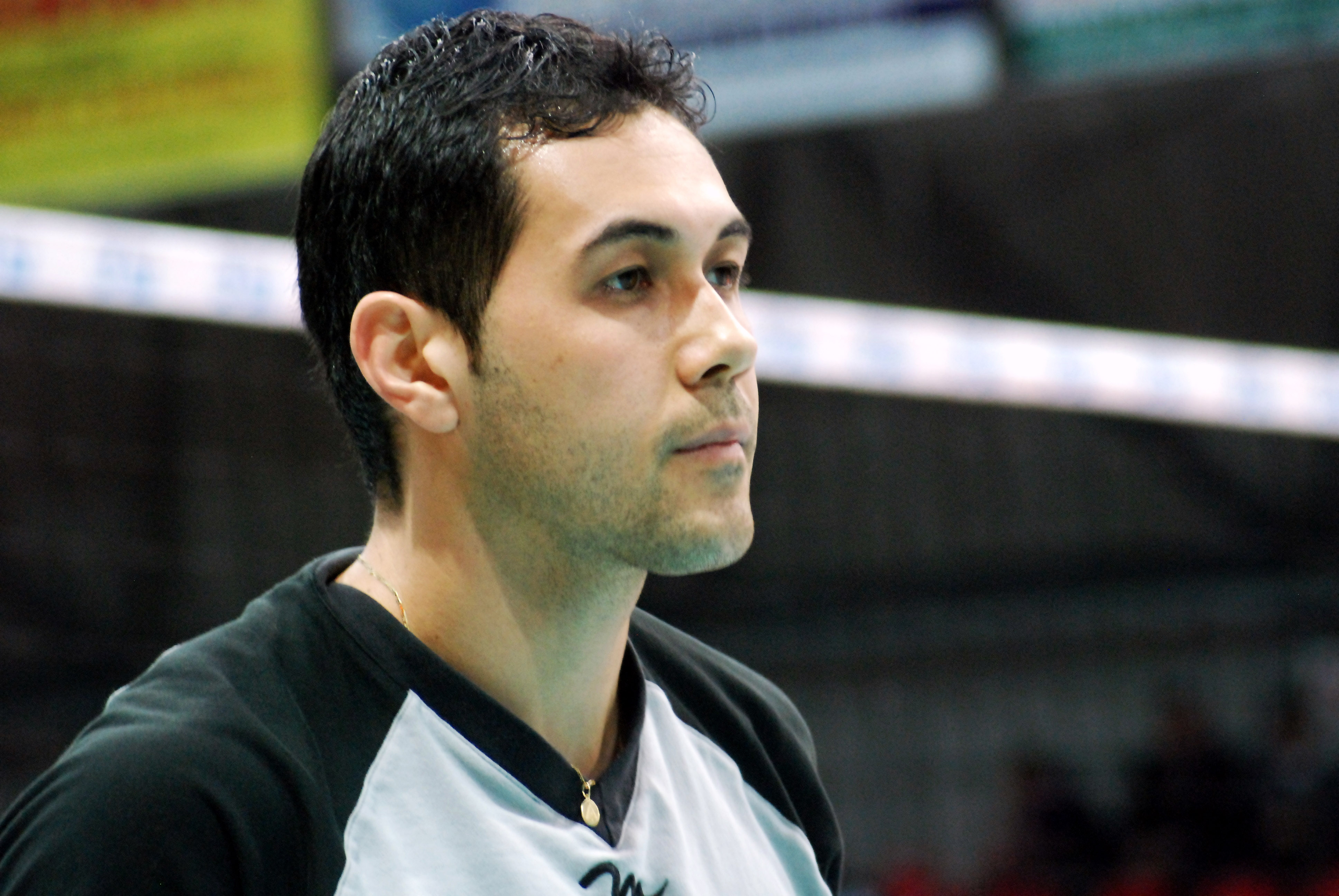
- Bravo in 2008

Personal information
- Full name: João Paulo Pereira Bravo
- Born: 7 January 1979 (age 47); Presidente Prudente, São Paulo, Brazil
- Height: 1.90 m (6 ft 3 in)
- Weight: 87 kg (192 lb)
- Spike: 340 cm (134 in)
- Block: 320 cm (126 in)

Coaching information
- Current team: Canada (AC); Arkas Spor Izmir (AC)
Previous teams coached
Years	Teams
2018–2019; 2021– 2023–	Canada U21; Arkas Spor Izmir (AC); Canada (AC)

Volleyball information
- Position: Outside spiker

Career
Years	Teams
1999–2000	Barão Hering/Blumenau
2000–2002	Unisul Esporte Clube
2002–2005	Noliko Maaseik
2004–2005	Gigantes de Adjuntas
2005–2006	Volley Piacenza
2006–2007	Volley Callipo
2007–2010	Volley Piacenza
2010–2013	Arkas Spor
2013–2015	Vôlei Ranata
2014–2016	Al-Arabi SC
2015–2021	Arkas Spor

National team
2009–2013	Brazil
Honours
Men's volleyball
Representing Brazil
World Championship
Gold medal – first place	2010 Italy	Team
World League
Gold medal – first place	2009 Belgrade	Team
Silver medal – second place	2011 Gdańsk	Team
World Cup
Bronze medal – third place	2011 Japan	Team
South American Championship
Gold medal – first place	2009 Colombia
Gold medal – first place	2011 Brazil
- Last updated: 7 July 2025

João Paulo Pereira Bravo (born January 7, 1979) is a Brazilian professional volleyball coach and former player. He is currently an assistant coach for the Canadian men's national team and the Turkish club Arkas Spor.

== Career ==
Bravo began his volleyball career in Brazil, where he won an award in 2000 as the most promising young player in the country. In 2002, Bravo transferred to the Belgian team Noliko Maaseik, where he not only was chosen the most valuable player in the country, but also experienced league and cup championships. He transferred to the Italian team Piacenza in 2005, and played in the Italian 1st league for five seasons, including one year for Vibo Valentia. With Piacenza, Bravo experienced championships in the Italian league, Italian Cup and the Europe Top Teams Cup. In 2008, he was chosen the best server in the European Champions League. He was part of the Brazil men's national volleyball team at the 2010 FIVB Volleyball Men's World Championship in Italy. He played for Arkas Spor Kulubu.
