= Zdeněk Haník =

Czech volleyball player (born 1986)

Zdenek Hanik
Personal information
- Nationality: Czech
- Born: 11 July 1986 (age 40)
- Height: 178 cm (5 ft 10 in)
- Weight: 80 kg (176 lb)
- Spike: 330 cm (130 in)
- Block: 315 cm (124 in)

Volleyball information
- Number: 2 (national team)

Career
- Years: Team
- 2015: Volley Amriswil

National team
- Years: Team
- 2015: Czech Republic

Zdenek Hanik (born 11 July 1986) is a Czech male volleyball player. He is part of the Czech Republic men's national volleyball team. On club level he plays for Volley Amriswil.
