= Pascal Cardinal =

Canadian volleyball player (born 1979)

Personal information
- Nationality: Canadian
- Born: 24 May 1979 (age 47)
- Height: 1.98 m (6 ft 6 in)
- Weight: 100 kg (220 lb)
- Spike: 354 cm (139 in)
- Block: 322 cm (127 in)

Volleyball information
- Number: 4

National team
(junior)1998-1999, (senior) 2001-2009	Canada

Pascal Cardinal (born 24 May 1979) is a Canadian male volleyball player. He was part of the Canada men's national volleyball team at the 2006 FIVB Volleyball Men's World Championship in Japan. He played CIS volleyball for the Alberta Golden Bears where he was a member of the CIS National Championship team in 2002 and was named the CIS Men's Volleyball Player of the Year in 2003, his fifth and final year with the program.
