= Nicholas Cundy (volleyball) =

Canadian volleyball player (born 1983)

Personal information
- Nationality: Canadian
- Born: 14 September 1983 (age 43)
- Height: 191 cm (6 ft 3 in)
- Weight: 88 kg (194 lb)
- Spike: 350 cm (138 in)
- Block: 320 cm (126 in)

Volleyball information
- Number: 2 (national team)

National team
| 2012 | Canada |

Nicholas Cundy (born 14 September 1983) is a former Canadian male volleyball player. He was part of the Canada men's national volleyball team. He played CIS volleyball for the Alberta Golden Bears where he was a member of the CIS National Championship team in 2005 and was named the CIS Men's Volleyball Player of the Year that same year.
