= Jesús Chourio =

Venezuelan volleyball player (born 1991)

Personal information
- Full name: Jesus Danian Chourio Pirela
- Nationality: Venezuelan
- Born: 2 January 1991 (age 35)
- Height: 2.01 m (6 ft 7 in)
- Weight: 88 kg (194 lb)
- Spike: 345 cm (136 in)
- Block: 340 cm (134 in)

Volleyball information
- Number: 13

Career
Years	Teams
2014	Zulia

National team
2014	Venezuela

Jesús Danian Chourio Pirela (born 2 January 1991) is a Venezuelan male volleyball player. He was part of the Venezuela men's national volleyball team at the 2014 FIVB Volleyball Men's World Championship in Poland. He played for Zulia.

== Clubs ==
- (Venezuela) Zulia (2014)
- (Finland) VaLePa (2015–2017)
