= Terry Danyluk =

Canadian volleyball player and coach

Current position
- Title: General Manager
- Team: Alberta Golden Bears

Biographical details
- Born: 22 March 1960 (age 66); Tofield, Alberta, Canada

Playing career
- 1978: Team Canada
- 1978–1981: Alberta Golden Bears
- 1981–1987: Team Canada

Coaching career (HC unless noted)
- 1991–2001: Alberta Golden Bears
- 2001–2003: Alberta Golden Bears (Asst.)
- 2003–2019: Alberta Golden Bears

Administrative career (AD unless noted)
- 2019–present: Alberta Golden Bears (GM)

Head coaching record
- Overall: 762–226 (.771)

Accomplishments and honors

Championships
- 8x U Sports National Champion (1981, 1997, 2002, 2005, 2008, 2009, 2014, 2015); 13x Canada West Conference Champion (1981, 1995, 1996, 1997, 1999, 2002, 2005, 2006, 2008, 2009, 2010, 2014, 2015)

Awards
- 5x U Sports Coach of the Year (1997, 1999, 2004, 2007, 2009); 2x Player of the Year Award (1980, 1981)

Terry Danyluk (born 22 March 1960) is the general manager for the Alberta Golden Bears men's volleyball team and is a former Canadian volleyball player. He was previously the head coach for the Golden Bears men's volleyball team for 26 seasons where he won six U Sports National Championships and won one National Championship as an assistant coach. He played CIAU men's volleyball for the Golden Bears from 1978 to 1981 where he won his first national championship and was twice named the U Sports Men's Volleyball Player of the Year.

Danyluk also competed in the men's tournament at the 1984 Summer Olympics and was a member of Canada men's national volleyball team in 1978 and from 1981 to 1987.

== University playing career ==
After spending some time with Canada's senior men's team as an 18 year old, Danyluk played for half a season with the Alberta Golden Bears' men's volleyball team during the 1978–79 season. He then played his first full season in CIAU men's volleyball in 1979–80 where he was named a CIAU All-Canadian and was the first recipient of the Men's Volleyball Player of the Year Award. He also played in his first national championship tournament where he was named the CIAU tournament most valuable player despite the Golden Bears finishing in third place in round-robin play.

For the 1980–81 season, Danyluk was again named a CIAU All-Canadian and the Men's Volleyball Player of the Year. He also won the University of Alberta's Wilson Trophy as the school's Male Athlete of the Year. The Golden Bears returned to the National Championship tournament in 1981 where the team finished in second place in the round-robin, but defeated the Manitoba Bisons in the final to win the first national championship in Golden Bears men's volleyball history. Danyluk was again named the tournament MVP.

== Coaching career ==
Following a playing career with Team Canada and professionally in Europe, Danyluk became the Alberta Golden Bears men's volleyball head coach in 1991. He took over a program that had zero conference championships in the previous ten seasons and just one national tournament appearance since 1981 (when he won as a player). In his first season, the team finished with a 12–4 record and in the second, the team returned to the national tournament where they finished in fifth place. In 1995, the Golden Bears won their first Canada West conference championship since 1981 and would repeat as conference champions in 1996 and 1997. After a silver medal finish at nationals in 1996, Danyluk led the Golden Bears to a 14–0 conference record in the 1996–97 season and the second national championship win in program history at the 1997 tournament. For the strong season, he was named the CIAU men's volleyball coach of the year, which he won again in 1999.

Following the 2000–01 season, Danyluk relinquished head coaching duties to Richard Schick so that he could focus on completing his master's degree at the University of Alberta. Danyluk continued to serve as an assistant coach for the team where he won his third national championship as the Golden Bears won the 2002 gold medal game. After two seasons as an assistant coach, he returned as head coach in 2003. From there the Golden Bears continued their dominance as they played in the national gold medal match in eight consecutive seasons from the aforementioned 2002 to 2009, winning three more national championships in 2005, 2008, and 2009. The streak was highlighted by the 2008–09 team that finished with a program-best 18–0 conference record and finished as repeat champions for the first time in team history. He also won the coach of the year award three more times, winning in 2004, 2007, and 2009.

In the increasingly competitive Canada West Conference, Danyluk led the Golden Bears to another conference title in 2010, but finished third in the national tournament. While his teams would return to nationals for the next three years, they would lose their opening match in each year between 2011 and 2013. In 2014 and 2015, however, the Golden Bears not only won the conference titles again, but they were crowned back-to-back national champions, bringing Danyluk to a total of eight national championships won, including six as a head coach. In 2017, he was inducted into the Volleyball Canada Hall of Fame.

In his final season, in 2018–19, Danyluk's Golden Bears finished in third place in Canada West with a 17–5 record, but were upset in the Canada West Quarter-Finals by the Thompson Rivers WolfPack. Because of their regular season finish, the Golden Bears were given an At-Large berth for the 2019 national tournament where they finished in fourth place. Overall, in his head coaching career, Danyluk's teams qualified for the national tournament in 24 of his 26 seasons coached along with an additional two other seasons as an assistant coach. In 2019, he became the general manager of Golden Bears.
