= Aden Tutton =

Australian volleyball player (born 1984)

Aden Tutton (born 6 December 1984) is an Australian volleyball player. He is competing for Australia at the 2012 Summer Olympics.

== Information ==
Aden Tutton has spent seven years on the national team. Tutton's primary training base was in Doetinchem, Netherlands. His secondary training base is in Canberra, Australia. The club that Tutton played for is Langhenkel Volley that is located in Doetinchem, Netherlands. He has the nickname of Tuts. Tutton was born in the year of 1984 on 12 June in Glenelg, South Australia. He currently resides in Adelaide, South Australia.

== Details ==
Tutton was the age of 27 when he appeared in the 2012 Olympics. He weighs about 176 pounds. His height is about 5'9.

== Education ==
The education that Aden Tutton is as follows:

- Immanuel College (SA, Australia)
- Bachelor of Human Movement - University of South Australia
