= Kōzō Takahashi =

Japanese volleyball player (born 1982)

Personal information
- Nationality: Japanese
- Born: 21 March 1982 (age 44); Matsuyama, Ehime, Japan
- Hometown: Aichi, Japan
- Height: 188 cm (6 ft 2 in)
- Weight: 77 kg (170 lb)
- Spike: 328 cm (129 in)
- Block: 318 cm (125 in)

Volleyball information
- Position: Setter
- Number: 3 (national team)

Career
Years	Teams
2009	Toyoda Gosei Trefuerza

National team
2009	Japan

Kōzō Takahashi (高橋幸造, Takahashi Kōzō; born 21 March 1982) is a former Japanese male volleyball player who played the position of setter. He was part of the Japan men's national volleyball team. On club level he played for Toyoda Gosei Trefuerza.
