= Andrey Zhekov =

Bulgarian volleyball player and coach

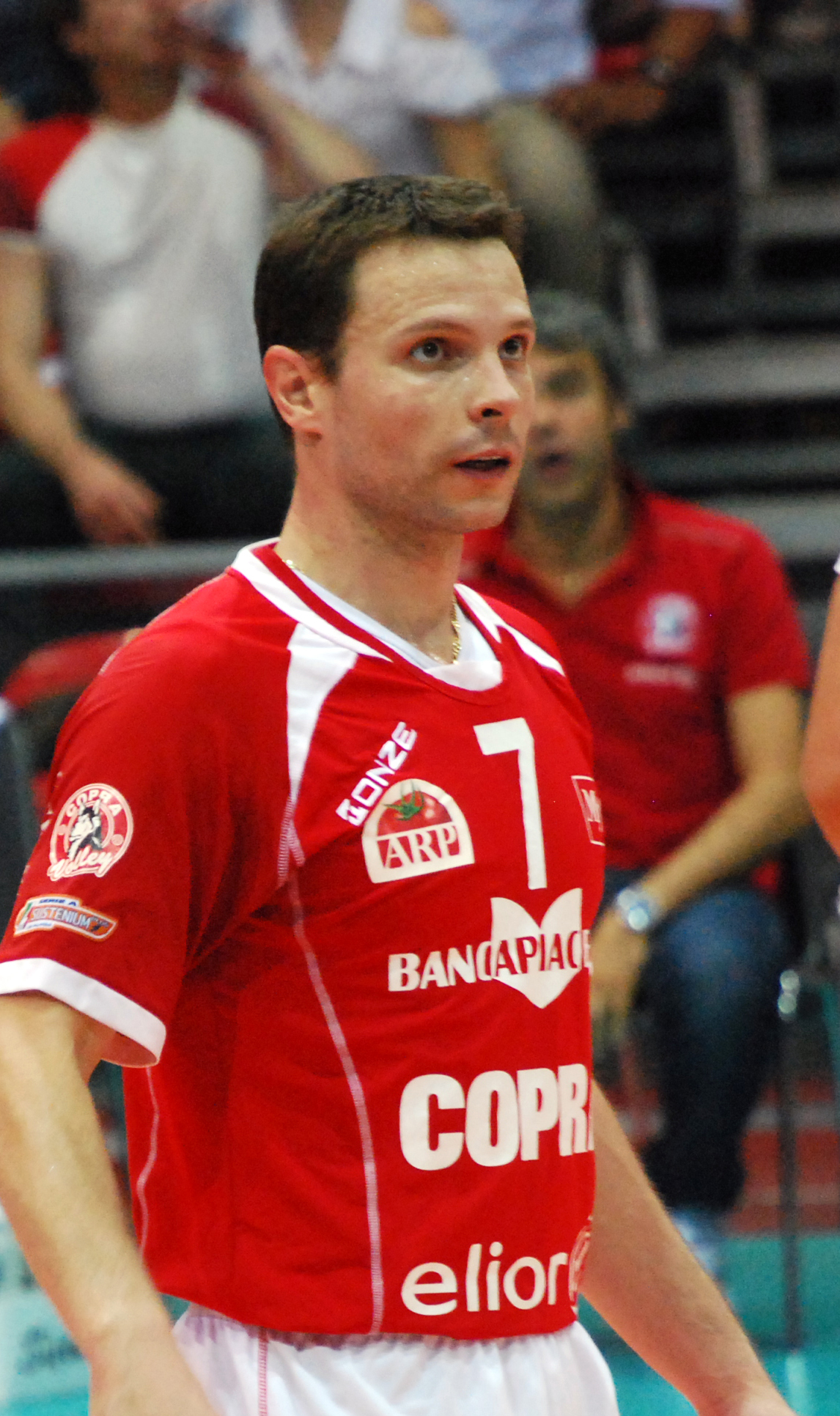

Personal information
- Born: March 12, 1980 (age 46); Sofia, Bulgaria
- Height: 1.90 m (6 ft 3 in)
- Weight: 82 kg (181 lb)
- Spike: 340 cm (134 in)
- Block: 326 cm (128 in)

Coaching information
- Current team: (Russia) Lokomotiv Novosibirsk (assistant coach)
Previous teams coached
Years	Teams
2019–2022; 2022–	Levski Volley (assistant coach); Lokomotiv Novosibirsk (assistant coach)

Volleyball information
- Position: setter

National team
Bulgaria
Honours
Men's volleyball
Representing Bulgaria
World Championship
Bronze medal – third place	2006 Japan	Team
FIVB World Cup
Bronze medal – third place	2007 Japan	Team
European Championships
Bronze medal – third place	2009 Turkey	Team

Andrey Zhekov (Bulgarian: Андрей Жеков; born March 12, 1980) is a former Bulgarian volleyball player and current head coach of Levski Volley. He entered the national team in 1998 at the age of 18. 190 cm tall and weighing 82 kg Zhekov is the former setter of the Bulgarian national team. Club Champion of Bulgaria with the teams of Levski Volley and Slavia Sofia. Zhekov is married and has two children.

In an interview Zhekov says that he'll not be playing in the 2012–13 season.

== Clubs ==
- (Bulgaria) Levski Volley (1999–2006)
- (Russia) Ural Ufa (2006–2007)
- (Greece) E.A. Patras (2007–2010)
- (Greece) Olympiacos S.C. (2010)
- (Turkey) Galatasaray SK (2010–2011)
- (Italy) Copra Volley (2011–2012)
- (Romania) Tomis Constanta (2013–2014)
- (Bulgaria) Levski Volley (2015–2016)
- (Romania) CS Arcada Galați (2017)
- (Turkey) Beşiktaş JK (2017)

== Individual awards ==
- 2006 World League "Best Setter"
