= Norbert Walter (volleyball) =

German volleyball player (born 1979)

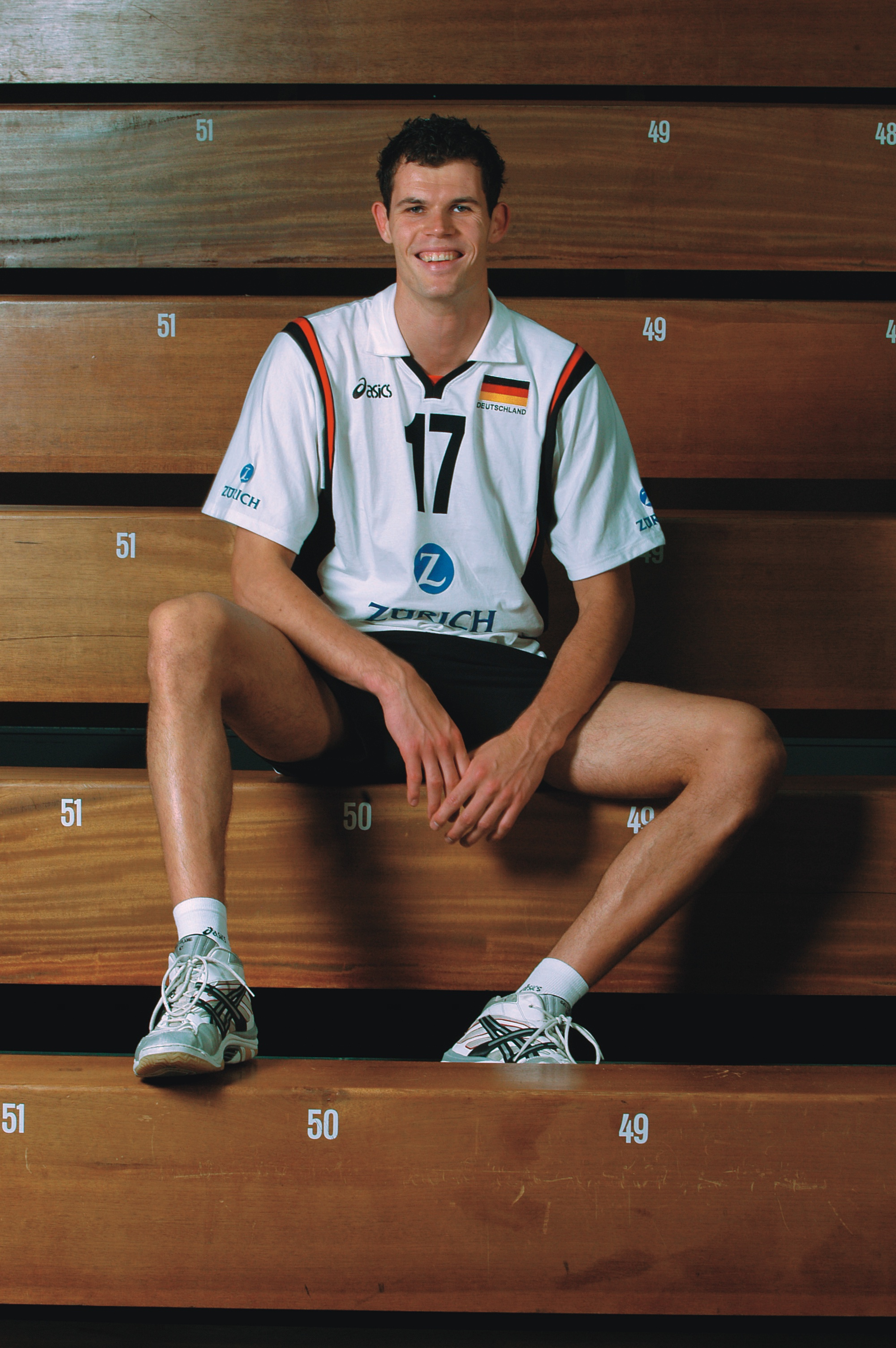
- Walter in 2006

Personal information
- Born: 1 July 1979 (age 47); Berlin, Germany
- Height: 2.10 m (6 ft 11 in)

Volleyball information
- Current team: Canadiens Mantova (2008–)

National team
Germany

Norbert Walter (born 1 July 1979) is a German professional volleyball player. His position on the field is middle blocker. He is currently playing for Italian side Canadiens Mantova. He's playing for the national team since 1999.

Before coming to Belgium, Walter played in Germany (a.o. SCC Berlin and VfB Friedrichshafen), Austria (Aon hotVolleys Vienna), France and Knack Randstad Roeselare in Belgium.
