= Joel Silva (volleyball) =

Venezuelan volleyball player (born 1985)

Personal information
- Born: 14 September 1985 (age 40) San Fernando de Apure, Venezuela

Sport
- Sport: Volleyball

Joel Silva (born 14 September 1985) is a Venezuelan volleyball player. He competed in the men's tournament at the 2008 Summer Olympics.
