= Hristo Tsvetanov =

Bulgarian volleyball player (born 1978)

Personal information
- Born: 29 March 1978 (age 48)
- Height: 1.98 m (6 ft 6 in)
- Weight: 85 kg (187 lb)
- Spike: 345 cm (136 in)
- Block: 330 cm (130 in)

Volleyball information
- Position: spiker

National team
Bulgaria
Honours
Men's volleyball
Representing Bulgaria
World Championship
Bronze medal – third place	2006 Japan	Team
FIVB World Cup
Bronze medal – third place	2007 Japan	Team competition
European Championships
Bronze medal – third place	2009 Turkey	Team

Hristo Tsvetanov (Bulgarian: Христо Цветанов; born 29 March 1978, in Cherven Bryag) is a Bulgarian male volleyball player who was a member of the Bulgaria men's national volleyball team. He was a part of the Bulgarian national team that competed in the 2008 Summer Olympics. At club level, Tsvetanov started his career in Lokomotiv Sofia and then moved to Levski Siconco Sofia. He later played for Diatec Trentino in Italy and Olympiacos in Greece.
