= Louis-Pierre Mainville =

Canadian volleyball player (born 1986)

Personal information
- Nationality: Canadian
- Born: 3 April 1986 (age 40)
- Height: 1.97 m (6 ft 6 in)
- Weight: 100 kg (220 lb)
- Spike: 350 cm (138 in)
- Block: 324 cm (128 in)

Volleyball information
- Number: 1

Career
Years	Teams
2010	Team Canada

National team
2010	Canada

Louis-Pierre Mainville (born 3 April 1986) is a Canadian male volleyball player. He was part of the Canada men's national volleyball team at the 2010 FIVB Volleyball Men's World Championship in Italy. He played for Team Canada. He currently lives with his wife and three sons in Hamilton, ON. He is also currently the Director of Athlete Development for the Ontario Volleyball Association.

== Clubs ==
- Team Canada (2010)
