= Ivan Zarev =

Bulgarian volleyball player (born 1986)

Personal information
- Full name: Ivan Zarev
- Born: February 25, 1986 (age 40)
- Height: 1.99 m (6 ft 6 in)
- Weight: 87 kg (192 lb)
- Spike: 341 cm (134 in)
- Block: 328 cm (129 in)

Volleyball information
- Position: setter
- Current team: CSKA Sofia

National team
Bulgaria

Ivan Zarev (Bulgarian: Иван Зарев, born February 25, 1986) is a Bulgarian volleyball player. He is the current reserve setter of the Bulgarian national team. Zarev made his club debut for Slavia Sofia and is now playing for CSKA Sofia.
