= Andrew Grant (volleyball) =

Australian volleyball player (born 1985)

Andrew Grant (born 22 April 1985) is an Australian volleyball player. He is competed for Australia at the 2012 Summer Olympics. After the 2012 Summer Olympics he returned to Australia and married longtime girlfriend Nancy Owens.
