= Sergey Makarov (volleyball) =

Russian volleyball player (born 1980)

Personal information
- Nationality: Russian
- Born: 28 March 1980 (age 46)
- Hometown: Moscow
- Height: 1.96 m (6 ft 5 in)
- Weight: 97 kg (214 lb)
- Spike: 337 cm (133 in)
- Block: 329 cm (130 in)

Volleyball information
- Position: Setter
- Current club: Kuzbass
- Number: 2

Career
Years
1996/97
2000/01
2001/04
2004/05
2005/07
2007/09
2009/11
2011/12
2012/13
2014-
Teams
(Russia) MGFSO
(Russia) MGFSO
(Russia) Dynamo Moscow
(Russia) Iskra
(Russia) Dynamo Moscow
(Russia) Lokomotiv Novosibirsk
(Russia) Iskra
(Russia) Fakel
(Russia) Belogorie
(Russia) Kuzbass

National team
2011-	Russia

Sergey Makarov (born 28 March 1980) is a Russian male volleyball player. He was part of the Russia men's national volleyball team at the 2014 FIVB Volleyball Men's World Championship in Poland. He played for Kuzbass. In 2011, as a part of the national team, Makarov won the World Cup.

== Clubs ==
- MGFSO (Today, the "Dynamo") (1996/97, 2000/01)
- Dynamo Moscow (2001/02, 2003/04)
- Iskra (2004/05)
- Dynamo Moscow (2005/07)
- Locomotiv Novosibirsk (2007/09)
- Iskra (2009/11)
- Fakel (2011/12)
- Belogorie (2012/13)
- Kuzbass (2014-)
