= Paul Carroll (volleyball) =

Australian volleyball player (born 1986)

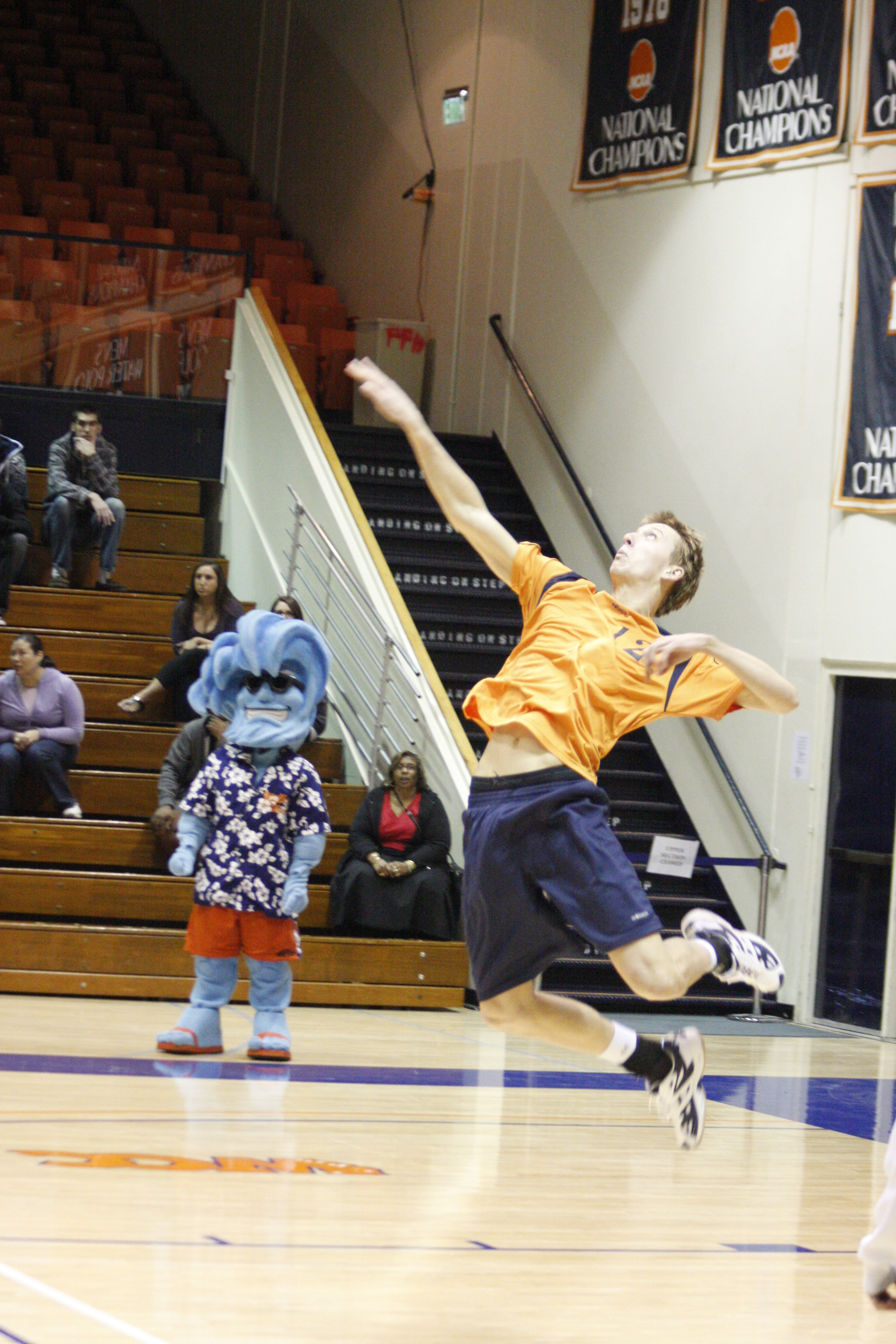

Personal information
- Nationality: Australia
- Born: 16 May 1986 (age 40); Taree, Australia
- Height: 2.07 m (6 ft 9 in)
- Weight: 98 kg (216 lb)
- Spike: 354 cm (139 in)
- Block: 340 cm (130 in)
- Education: Pepperdine University

Volleyball information
- Position: Opposite Spiker
- Current club: (United States) Pepperdine Waves (associate head coach)

Career
Years	Teams
2006–2009; 2009–2010; 2010–2011; 2011–2018; 2018–2019	(United States) Pepperdine Waves (Italy) Yoga Forli (Germany) Generali Haching (Germany) Berlin Recycling Volleys (Russia) Yenisey Krasnoyarsk

National team
2005–2019	Australia

Paul Carroll (born 16 May 1986) is an Australian former volleyball player. Carroll is a 207 cm right side/opposite who has been a key member of the Australian National Men's Team (the Volleyroos) since his debut in 2005 at the age of 19. In 2008, he was named Australian Male Volleyballer of the Year.

Carroll was a three-time All-American first-team selection at Pepperdine University and was named the National Player of the Year by the AVCA and Volleyball Magazine in 2009. He finished third all-time at Pepperdine in kills (2,101), service aces (154) and points (2,454.0). Carroll set Pepperdine records in the rally-scoring era for both kills in a season (661 in 2009) and kills in a single match (37 three times). He twice led the nation in kills per game. The Waves advanced to the NCAA Championships twice in his four seasons.

He played professionally in Italy, Germany and Russia from 2009 to 2019. He was named MVP of the German Bundesliga in 2010–2011. He helped lead Berlin Recycling Volleys to six league championships in Germany in a seven-year span. He reached the CEV Champions League Final Four twice, and won a bronze medal in 2015.

After retiring, Carroll was appointed as the Pepperdine Waves' associate head coach.
