= Pierre Pujol =

French volleyball player (born 1984)

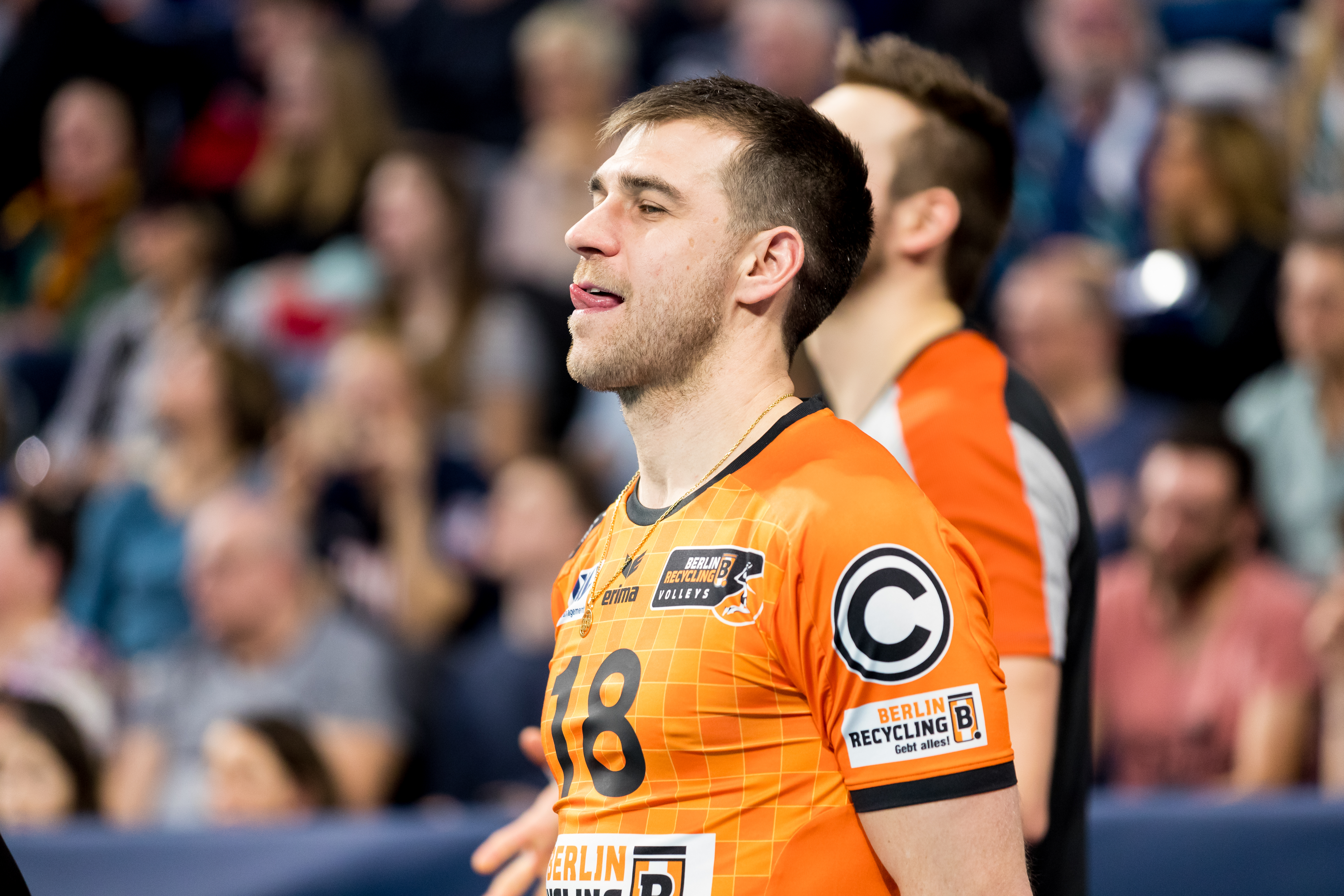

Personal information
- Full name: Pierre Michel Pujol
- Nationality: French
- Born: 13 July 1984 (age 42); Bordeaux, France
- Height: 1.90 m (6 ft 3 in)
- Weight: 85 kg (187 lb)
- Spike: 335 cm (132 in)
- Block: 315 cm (124 in)

Volleyball information
- Position: Setter
- Current club: Dinamo București

Career
Years	Teams
2003–2007; 2007–2008; 2008–2010; 2010–2011; 2011–2012; 2012–2017; 2017–2018; 2018–2019; 2019–2021; 2021–2022; 2022–2023; 2023–	Stade Poitevin Poitiers; Sisley Treviso; AS Cannes; Sisley Treviso; Fart Kielce; AS Cannes; Berlin Recycling Volleys; GFC Ajaccio VB; Berlin Recycling Volleys; Gas Sales Piacenza; BBTS Bielsko-Biała; Dinamo București

National team
2003–	France
Honours
Men's volleyball
Representing France
FIVB World League
Silver medal – second place	2006 Moscow
Bronze medal – third place	2016 Kraków
CEV European Championship
Gold medal – first place	2015 Bulgaria/Italy

Pierre Michel Pujol (born 13 July 1984) is a French professional volleyball player who plays as a setter for Dinamo București. He is a former member of the France national team with which he competed at the 2010 World Championship held in Italy.

== Honours ==
=== Club ===
- CEV Cup
  - 2010–11 – with Sisley Treviso
- Domestic
  - 2006–07 French Championship, with Stade Poitevin Poitiers
  - 2007–08 Italian SuperCup, with Sisley Treviso
  - 2009–10 French Championship, with AS Cannes
  - 2017–18 German Championship, with Berlin Recycling Volleys
  - 2019–20 German SuperCup, with Berlin Recycling Volleys
  - 2019–20 German Cup, with Berlin Recycling Volleys
  - 2020–21 German Championship, with Berlin Recycling Volleys
  - 2020–21 German SuperCup, with Berlin Recycling Volleys
