= 2018 Women's Junior South American Volleyball Championship =

Tournament details
- Host country: Peru
- Dates: 17 – 21 October
- Teams: 8
- Venue: 1 (in Lima host cities)

Final positions
- Champions: Brazil (20th title)

Tournament awards
- MVP: Victoria Mayer (ARG)

The 2018 Women's Junior South American Volleyball Championship was the 24th edition of the tournament, organised by South America's governing volleyball body, the Confederación Sudamericana de Voleibol (CSV). The top two teams qualified for the 2019 Junior World Championship.

== Competing nations ==
The following national teams participated in the tournament, teams were seeded according to how they finished in the previous edition of the tournament:

Pool A	Pool B
Peru (Host); Uruguay; Chile; Ecuador	Brazil; Argentina; Colombia; Bolivia

== First round ==
- All times are Peruvian Standard Time (UTC−05:00)

=== Pool A ===
Pos	Team	Pld	W	L	Pts	SPW	SPL	SPR	SW	SL	SR	Qualification
1	Peru	3	3	0	9	225	132	1.705	9	0	MAX	Semifinals
2	Chile	3	2	1	6	219	182	1.203	6	4	1.500	Semifinals
3	Ecuador	3	1	2	3	206	250	0.824	4	7	0.571	
4	Uruguay	3	0	3	0	167	248	0.673	1	9	0.111	

Date	Time		Score		Set 1	Set 2	Set 3	Set 4	Set 5	Total
17 Oct	13:00	Uruguay	0–3	Chile	8–25	11–25	20–25			39–75
17 Oct	19:00	Peru	3–0	Ecuador	25–10	25–10	25–20			75–40
18 Oct	13:00	Uruguay	1–3	Ecuador	25–23	19–25	22–25	15–25		81–98
18 Oct	19:00	Peru	3–0	Chile	25–23	25–8	25–14			75–45
19 Oct	15:00	Chile	3–1	Ecuador	25–15	25–15	24–26	25–12		99–68
19 Oct	19:00	Peru	3–0	Uruguay	25–21	25–13	25–13			75–47

=== Pool B ===
Pos	Team	Pld	W	L	Pts	SPW	SPL	SPR	SW	SL	SR	Qualification
1	Argentina	3	3	0	9	248	169	1.467	9	1	9.000	Semifinals
2	Brazil	3	2	1	6	234	203	1.153	7	3	2.333	Semifinals
3	Colombia	3	1	2	3	189	190	0.995	3	6	0.500	
4	Bolivia	3	0	3	0	116	225	0.516	0	9	0.000	

Date	Time		Score		Set 1	Set 2	Set 3	Set 4	Set 5	Total
17 Oct	15:00	Brazil	3–0	Bolivia	25–13	25–16	25–12			75–41
17 Oct	17:00	Argentina	3–0	Colombia	25–17	25–14	25–19			75–50
18 Oct	15:00	Argentina	3–0	Bolivia	25–7	25–16	25–14			75–37
18 Oct	17:00	Brazil	3–0	Colombia	25–16	25–23	27–25			77–64
19 Oct	13:00	Colombia	3–0	Bolivia	25–14	25–11	25–13			75–38
19 Oct	17:00	Brazil	1–3	Argentina	25–20	26–28	20–25	11–25		82–98

== Final round ==
=== 5th to 8th places bracket ===
5th to 8th Classification
20 Oct – Lima
Ecuador	0
Bolivia	3
20 Oct – Lima
Colombia	3
Uruguay	0

5th place match
21 Oct – Lima
Bolivia	0
Colombia	3
7th place match
21 Oct – Lima
Ecuador	1
Uruguay	3

=== Championship bracket ===
Semifinals
20 Oct – Lima
Peru	1
Brazil	3
20 Oct – Lima
Argentina	3
Chile	0

Final
21 Oct – Lima
Brazil	3
Argentina	2
Third place
21 Oct – Lima
Peru	3
Chile	0

=== Classification 5 to 8 ===
Date	Time		Score		Set 1	Set 2	Set 3	Set 4	Set 5	Total
20 Oct	14:00	Ecuador	0–3	Bolivia	24–26	16–25	23–25			63–76
20 Oct	16:00	Colombia	3–0	Uruguay	25–12	25–21	25–12			75–45

=== Semifinals ===
Date	Time		Score		Set 1	Set 2	Set 3	Set 4	Set 5	Total
20 Oct	18:00	Argentina	3–0	Chile	25–12	27–25	25–16			77–53
20 Oct	20:00	Peru	1–3	Brazil	22–25	25–23	23–25	14–25		84–98

=== 7th place match ===
Date	Time		Score		Set 1	Set 2	Set 3	Set 4	Set 5	Total
21 Oct	12:00	Ecuador	1–3	Uruguay	22–25	16–25	25–19	21–25		84–94

=== 5th place match ===
Date	Time		Score		Set 1	Set 2	Set 3	Set 4	Set 5	Total
21 Oct	14:00	Bolivia	0–3	Colombia	15–25	13–25	11–25			39–75

=== Bronze Medal match ===
Date	Time		Score		Set 1	Set 2	Set 3	Set 4	Set 5	Total
21 Oct	16:00	Peru	3–0	Chile	25–16	25–19	25–15			75–50

=== Gold Medal match ===
Date	Time		Score		Set 1	Set 2	Set 3	Set 4	Set 5	Total
21 Oct	18:00	Brazil	3–2	Argentina	25–23	25–21	25–27	19–25	15–12	109–108

== Final standing ==
Rank	Team
1st place, gold medalist(s)	Brazil
2nd place, silver medalist(s)	Argentina
3rd place, bronze medalist(s)	Peru
4	Chile
5	Colombia
6	Bolivia
7	Uruguay
8	Ecuador

Qualified for the 2019 Junior World Championship

2018 Women's Junior South American Volleyball Championship

Brazil
20th title

12–woman roster
Rosely Nogueira, Laura Kudiess, Nicole Drewnick, Beatriz Santana, Daniela Seibt, Jheovana Sebastião, Kisy Nascimento, Tainara Santos (c), Daniela Cechetto, Larissa Besen, Julia Bergmann, Keyla Alves
Head coach

== Individual awards ==
- Most valuable player
  - Victoria Mayer (ARG)
- Best Opposite
  - Jheovana Sebastião (BRA)
- Best outside hitters
  - Ángeles Ligorria (ARG)
  - Tainara Santos (BRA)
- Best middle blockers
  - Bianca Farriol (ARG)
  - Flavia Montes (PER)
- Best setter
  - Victoria Mayer (ARG)
- Best libero
  - Keyla Alves (BRA)
