= 2026 Copa Sudamericana (women's volleyball) =

2026 Women's Volleyball Copa Sudamericana
Tournament details
- Host country: Peru
- City: Lima
- Dates: 22–26 July
- Teams: 8
- Venue: 1 (in 1 host city)

Final positions
- Champions: Brazil (1st title)
- Runners-up: Colombia
- Third place: Argentina
- Fourth place: Chile

Tournament awards
- MVP: (Brazil) Sabrina Machado

Tournament statistics
- Matches played: 20

The 2026 Women's Volleyball Copa Sudamericana was the second edition of the Women's Volleyball Copa Sudamericana, the annual second-tier international volleyball competition organised by the Confederación Sudamericana de Voleibol (CSV) for women's national teams of South America. It was held in Lima, Peru from 22 to 26 July 2026.

Starting with this edition, the tournament was rebranded Copa Sudamericana instead of Copa América, the name it was known by in the inaugural edition.

The tournament served as qualifiers for other two international competitions. The top four teams—other than Brazil and Argentina—qualified for the 2026 Women's South American Volleyball Championship in Rio de Janeiro, Brazil, while Brazil and Argentina qualified automatically as the hosts and the top-ranked team in the FIVB Women's World Ranking (aside from Brazil), respectively. The top team—other than Peru and Brazil—qualified for the 2027 Pan American Games women's volleyball tournament in Lima, Peru, while Peru and Brazil qualified automatically as the hosts and the 2025 Junior Pan American Games women's volleyball tournament champions, respectively.

Brazil won their first Copa Sudamericana title by beating runners-up Colombia 3–0 in the final. Defending champion Argentina failed to retain the title but managed to finish on the podium after defeating Chile 3–0 in the third-place match. Colombia, Chile, Peru and Venezuela qualified for the 2026 Women's South American Championship, with Colombia also qualifying for the 2027 Pan American Games women's volleyball tournament.

== Host and venue ==
San Borja	Location of venue in Lima metropolitan area.
Coliseo Eduardo Dibós	Location of venue in Lima metropolitan area.
Capacity: 4,600	Location of venue in Lima metropolitan area.

In January 2026, Gino Vegas, president of the Peruvian Volleyball Federation, confirmed Peru as the host nation for the tournament, reaffirming what had been announced by CSV President Marco Tulio Teixeira in June 2025 and by Gino Vegas himself in December 2025. Lima was confirmed as the host city on 4 June 2026.

The competition is entirely played at the Coliseo Eduardo Dibós located in the San Borja District of Lima. It was originally scheduled to take place at the Polideportivo Lucha Fuentes before being moved to the Coliseo Eduardo Dibós.

== Teams ==
Eight of the twelve CSV member associations entered the tournament.

Team	App	Previous best performance
Argentina (holders)	2nd	Champions (2025)
Bolivia	1st	None (Debut)
Brazil	2nd	Third place (2025)
Chile	2nd	Fourth place (2025)
Ecuador	1st	None (Debut)
Colombia	1st	None (Debut)
Peru (hosts)	2nd	Runners-up (2025)
Venezuela	2nd	Fifth place (2025)

Since Brazil's main team was competing in the 2026 FIVB Women's Volleyball Nations League, they entered the tournament with an alternative squad called "Seleção B".

== Competition format ==
The competition format consisted of a two groups of four teams each, which were played on a single round-robin basis in the preliminary round. The group standing procedure was as follows:

1. Total number of victories (matches won, matches lost);
2. Match points;
  - Match won 3–0 or 3–1: 3 points for the winner, 0 points for the loser
  - Match won 3–2: 2 points for the winner, 1 point for the loser
  - Match forfeited: 3 points for the winner, 0 points (0–25, 0–25, 0–25) for the loser
3. Sets ratio;
4. Points ratio;
5. If the tie continues between two teams: result of the last match between the tied teams. If the tie continues between three or more teams: a new classification would be made taking into consideration only the matches involving the teams in question.

Once the preliminary round is completed, the top two teams in each group advance to the semi-finals, while the third and fourth placed teams advanced to the semi-finals for 5th to 8th places. The winners of the semi-finals advance to the final to define the champions while the losers of the semi-finals decide third and fourth place. Winners of the 5th to 8th semi-finals play for the fifth and sixth place while losers play for seventh and eighth place.

== Preliminary round ==
All match times are local times, PET (UTC-5).

=== Group A ===
Pos	Team	Pld	W	L	Pts	SW	SL	SR	SPW	SPL	SPR	Qualification
1	Brazil	3	3	0	9	9	0	MAX	225	144	1.563	Semi-finals
2	Chile	3	2	1	6	6	3	2.000	197	190	1.037	Semi-finals
3	Peru (H)	3	1	2	3	3	6	0.500	185	192	0.964	5th–8th semi-finals
4	Bolivia	3	0	3	0	0	9	0.000	144	225	0.640	5th–8th semi-finals

Source: FIVB
Rules for classification: Group standing procedure
(H) Host

Date	Time		Score		Set 1	Set 2	Set 3	Set 4	Set 5	Total	Attd	Report
22 Jul	13:15	Brazil	3–0	Bolivia	25–18	25–19	25–11			75–48		P2 Report
22 Jul	18:15	Chile	3–0	Peru	25–20	25–19	25–22			75–61		P2 Report
23 Jul	13:15	Chile	3–0	Bolivia	25–18	25–14	25–22			75–54	407	P2 Report
23 Jul	18:15	Brazil	3–0	Peru	25–14	25–15	25–20			75–49		P2 Report
24 Jul	13:15	Brazil	3–0	Chile	25–13	25–18	25–16			75–47	599	P2 Report
24 Jul	18:15	Peru	3–0	Bolivia	25–18	25–14	25–10			75–42	3,046	P2 Report

=== Group B ===
Pos	Team	Pld	W	L	Pts	SW	SL	SR	SPW	SPL	SPR	Qualification
1	Colombia	3	3	0	9	9	1	9.000	251	169	1.485	Semi-finals
2	Argentina	3	2	1	6	7	4	1.750	252	206	1.223	Semi-finals
3	Venezuela	3	1	2	3	4	6	0.667	192	199	0.965	5th–8th semi-finals
4	Ecuador	3	0	3	0	0	9	0.000	104	225	0.462	5th–8th semi-finals

Source: FIVB
Rules for classification: Group standing procedure

Date	Time		Score		Set 1	Set 2	Set 3	Set 4	Set 5	Total	Attd	Report
22 Jul	10:45	Argentina	3–0	Ecuador	25–10	25–11	25–13			75–34		P2 Report
22 Jul	15:45	Colombia	3–0	Venezuela	25–19	25–14	25–13			75–46	871	P2 Report
23 Jul	10:45	Colombia	3–0	Ecuador	25–14	25–9	25–13			75–36	346	P2 Report
23 Jul	15:45	Argentina	3–1	Venezuela	25–15	15–25	25–15	25–16		90–71	588	P2 Report
24 Jul	10:45	Venezuela	3–0	Ecuador	25–13	25–10	25–11			75–34	336	P2 Report
24 Jul	15:45	Argentina	1–3	Colombia	11–25	25–27	25–21	26–28		87–101		P2 Report

== Final round ==
=== 5th–8th places ===
5th–8th semi-finals
25 July
Venezuela	3
Bolivia	0
25 July
Peru	3
Ecuador	0

5th place match
26 July
Venezuela	1
Peru	3
7th place match
26 July
Bolivia	3
Ecuador	0

==== 5th–8th semi-finals ====
Date	Time		Score		Set 1	Set 2	Set 3	Set 4	Set 5	Total	Attd	Report
25 Jul	11:30	Venezuela	3–0	Bolivia	25–12	25–15	28–26			78–53	375	P2 Report
25 Jul	19:00	Peru	3–0	Ecuador	25–11	25–14	25–8			75–33	3,988	P2 Report

==== 7th place match ====
Date	Time		Score		Set 1	Set 2	Set 3	Set 4	Set 5	Total	Attd	Report
26 Jul	10:00	Bolivia	3–0	Ecuador	25–18	25–18	25–16			75–52	104	P2 Report

==== 5th place match ====
Date	Time		Score		Set 1	Set 2	Set 3	Set 4	Set 5	Total	Attd	Report
26 Jul	15:00	Venezuela	1–3	Peru	20–25	20–25	28–26	20–25		88–101	3,811	P2 Report

=== 1st–4th places ===
Semi-finals
25 July
Colombia	3
Chile	0
25 July
Brazil	3
Argentina	1

Final
26 July
Colombia	0
Brazil	3
3rd place match
26 July
Chile	0
Argentina	3

==== Semi-finals ====
Date	Time		Score		Set 1	Set 2	Set 3	Set 4	Set 5	Total	Attd	Report
25 Jul	14:00	Colombia	3–0	Chile	25–19	25–20	25–13			75–52	866	P2 Report
25 Jul	16:30	Brazil	3–1	Argentina	25–17	20–25	25–22	28–26		98–90		P2 Report

==== 3rd place match ====
Date	Time		Score		Set 1	Set 2	Set 3	Set 4	Set 5	Total	Attd	Report
26 Jul	12:30	Chile	0–3	Argentina	14–25	21–25	20–25			55–75	1,171	P2 Report

==== Final ====
Date	Time		Score		Set 1	Set 2	Set 3	Set 4	Set 5	Total	Attd	Report
26 Jul	17:30	Colombia	0–3	Brazil	22–25	21–25	22–25			65–75	3,854	P2 Report

== Final standing ==
Rank	Team
1st place, gold medalist(s)	Brazil
2nd place, silver medalist(s)	Colombia
3rd place, bronze medalist(s)	Argentina
4	Chile
5	Peru
6	Venezuela
7	Bolivia
8	Ecuador

2026 Copa Sudamericana

Brazil
1st title

Team Roster:

1 Vivian Lima, 2 Bruninha, 4 Juju Gandra, 5 Jaqueline Schmitz, 6 Aline Segato, 7 Kenya Malachias, 9 Sabrina Machado, 10 Lanna Gabriella, 11 Karina Souza (C), 12 Lívia Santos, 13 Mariana Brambilla, 15 Glayce Vasconcelos, 20 Paulina Souza (L), 21 Kika (L).

Head coach: (Brazil) Wagão

== Individual awards ==
The following individual awards were presented at the end of the tournament.

- Most valuable player (MVP)

Sabrina Machado (BRA)

- Best middle blockers

Valerin Carabalí (COL)
Lanna Gabriella (BRA)

- Best setter

Maria Alejandra Marin (COL)

- Best opposite spiker

Bianca Cugno (ARG)

- Best outside spikers

Karina Souza (BRA)
Brenda Lobatón (PER)

- Best libero

Carla Ruz (CHI)

== See also ==
- 2026 AVC Women's Volleyball Cup
- 2026 Women's European Volleyball League
- 2026 Women's South American Volleyball Championship
