= 2018 Girls' Youth South American Volleyball Championship =

Tournament details
- Host country: Colombia
- Dates: 8–12 July 2018
- Teams: 8
- Venue: 1

Final positions
- Champions: Argentina (2nd title)

Tournament awards
- MVP: Bianca Cugno (ARG)

The 2018 Girls' Youth South American Volleyball Championship was the 21st edition of the Girls' Youth South American Volleyball Championship, organised by South America's governing volleyball body, the Confederación Sudamericana de Voleibol (CSV). The tournament will be held in Valledupar, Colombia from 8 to 12 July 2018.

A total of eight teams played in the tournament, with players born on or after 1 January 2002 eligible to participate.

Same as previous editions, the tournament acted as the CSV qualifiers for the FIVB Volleyball Girls' U18 World Championship. The top three teams qualified for the 2019 FIVB Volleyball Girls' U18 World Championship as the CSV representatives.

== Competing nations ==
The following national teams participated:

- Argentina
- Bolivia
- Brazil
- Chile
- Colombia
- Ecuador
- Peru
- Uruguay

== Preliminary round ==
- All times are local (UTC−5).

=== Pool A ===
Pos	Team	Pld	W	L	Pts	SW	SL	SR	SPW	SPL	SPR	Qualification
1	Brazil	3	3	0	8	9	2	4.500	260	176	1.477	Semifinals
2	Colombia	3	2	1	7	8	3	2.667	233	201	1.159	Semifinals
3	Chile	3	1	2	3	3	6	0.500	174	201	0.866	5th–8th place classification
4	Ecuador	3	0	3	0	0	9	0.000	136	225	0.604	5th–8th place classification

Date	Time		Score		Set 1	Set 2	Set 3	Set 4	Set 5	Total	Report
8 Jul	18:00	Brazil	3–0	Ecuador	25–17	25–13	25–11			75–41	P1
8 Jul	20:00	Colombia	3–0	Chile	25–10	25–21	25–16			75–47	P1
9 Jul	18:00	Brazil	3–0	Chile	25–11	25–20	25–21			75–52	P1
9 Jul	20:00	Colombia	3–0	Ecuador	25–20	25–12	25–12			75–44	P1
10 Jul	18:00	Chile	3–0	Ecuador	25–18	25–16	25–17			75–51	P1
10 Jul	20:00	Brazil	3–2	Colombia	23–25	22–25	25–10	25–16	15–7	110–83	P1

=== Pool B ===
Pos	Team	Pld	W	L	Pts	SW	SL	SR	SPW	SPL	SPR	Qualification
1	Argentina	3	3	0	8	9	2	4.500	253	195	1.297	Semifinals
2	Peru	3	2	1	7	8	3	2.667	258	192	1.344	Semifinals
3	Uruguay	3	1	2	3	3	6	0.500	173	208	0.832	5th–8th place classification
4	Bolivia	3	0	3	0	0	9	0.000	139	228	0.610	5th–8th place classification

Date	Time		Score		Set 1	Set 2	Set 3	Set 4	Set 5	Total	Report
8 Jul	14:00	Argentina	3–0	Bolivia	25–12	25–11	25–13			75–36	P1
8 Jul	16:00	Peru	3–0	Uruguay	25–15	25–13	25–16			75–44	P1
9 Jul	14:00	Peru	3–0	Bolivia	25–15	25–17	25–13			75–45	P1
9 Jul	16:00	Argentina	3–0	Uruguay	25–15	25–18	25–18			75–51	P1
10 Jul	14:00	Bolivia	0–3	Uruguay	26–28	13–25	19–25			58–78	P1
10 Jul	16:00	Peru	2–3	Argentina	25–22	23–25	21–25	25–15	14–16	108–103	P1

== Final rounds ==
=== 5–8th-place classification ===
5–8th-place semifinals
11 July
Chile	3
Bolivia	0
11 July
Uruguay	3
Ecuador	1

Fifth place
12 July
Chile	3
Uruguay	1
Seventh place
12 July
Bolivia	0
Ecuador	3

==== 5–8th semifinals ====
Date	Time		Score		Set 1	Set 2	Set 3	Set 4	Set 5	Total	Report
11 Jul	14:00	Chile	3–0	Bolivia	25–18	25–23	25–18			75–59	P1
11 Jul	16:00	Uruguay	3–1	Ecuador	13–25	25–23	25–22	25–14		88–84	P1

==== Seventh-place match ====
Date	Time		Score		Set 1	Set 2	Set 3	Set 4	Set 5	Total	Report
12 Jul	14:00	Bolivia	0–3	Ecuador	21–25	22–25	21–25			64–75	P1

==== Fifth-place match ====
Date	Time		Score		Set 1	Set 2	Set 3	Set 4	Set 5	Total	Report
12 Jul	16:00	Chile	3–1	Uruguay	25–18	25–7	21–25	25–9		96–59	P1

=== Championship ===
Semifinals
11 July
Brazil	0
Peru	3
11 July
Argentina	3
Colombia	0

Final
12 July
Peru	1
Argentina	3
Third place
12 July
Brazil	3
Colombia	0

==== Semifinals ====
Date	Time		Score		Set 1	Set 2	Set 3	Set 4	Set 5	Total	Report
11 Jul	18:00	Brazil	0–3	Peru	9–25	15–25	11–25			35–75	P1
11 Jul	20:00	Argentina	3–0	Colombia	25–12	25–23	25–20			75–55	P1

==== Third-place match ====
Date	Time		Score		Set 1	Set 2	Set 3	Set 4	Set 5	Total	Report
12 Jul	18:00	Brazil	3–0	Colombia	25–20	25–12	25–21			75–53	P1

==== Final ====
Date	Time		Score		Set 1	Set 2	Set 3	Set 4	Set 5	Total	Report
12 Jul	20:00	Peru	1–3	Argentina	19–25	25–23	19–25	22–25		85–98	P1

== Final standing ==
Rank	Team	Qualification
1st place, gold medalist(s)	Argentina	Qualified for the 2019 Youth; World Championship
2nd place, silver medalist(s)	Peru	Qualified for the 2019 Youth; World Championship
3rd place, bronze medalist(s)	Brazil	Qualified for the 2019 Youth; World Championship
4	Colombia	
5	Chile	
6	Uruguay	
7	Ecuador	
8	Bolivia	

2018 Girls' Youth South American Volleyball Championship

Argentina
2nd title

== All-Star Team ==
- Most valuable player
  - Bianca Cugno (ARG)
- Best Outside Hitters
  - Ana Karina Olaya (COL)
  - Bianca Cugno (ARG)
- Best setter
  - Yadhira Anchante (PER)
- Best Middle Blockers
  - María Tiziana Puljiz (ARG)
  - María Fernanda López-Torres (PER)
- Best Opposite
  - Ana Cristina Souza (BRA)
- Best libero
  - Letícia Moura (BRA)
