= 2026 Women's South American Volleyball Championship =

Tournament details
- Host country: Brazil
- City: Rio de Janeiro
- Dates: 8–13 September
- Teams: 6
- Venue: 1 (in 1 host city)

Final positions
- Champions: Brazil (24th title)
- Runners-up: Argentina
- Third place: Colombia
- Fourth place: Venezuela

Tournament awards
- MVP: (Brazil) Gabriela Guimarães
- Best Setter: (Brazil) Roberta Ratzke
- Best OH: (Colombia) Ana Karina Olaya; (Brazil) Ana Cristina de Souza
- Best MB: (Venezuela) Alejandra Argüello; (Argentina) Candelaria Herrera
- Best OPP: (Argentina) Bianca Cugno
- Best Libero: (Argentina) Agostina Pelozo

Tournament statistics
- Matches played: 15
- Attendance: 64,752 (4,317 per match)

The 2026 Women's South American Volleyball Championship was the 36th edition of the Women's South American Volleyball Championship, held in Rio de Janeiro, Brazil, and organized by the South American volleyball governing body, the Confederación Sudamericana de Voleibol (CSV). For the first time, the tournament winner directly qualified for the 2028 Summer Olympics, while the top three teams secured qualification for the 2027 FIVB World Cup.

Hosts Brazil captured their 24th title and secured a spot for the 2028 Olympic Games after an undefeated run capped by a 3–0 victory over Argentina in the final match day. Alongside champions Brazil, runners-up Argentina qualified for the 2027 FIVB World Cup, while Chile secured the bronze medal and final World Cup berth.

== Year change ==
On 22 June 2023, the Fédération Internationale de Volleyball (FIVB) announced a comprehensive restructuring of the international calendar for the 2025–2028 cycle. As part of this overhaul, continental championships shifted from odd-numbered years to even-numbered years, beginning in 2026. The structural change was implemented to prioritize athlete health and recovery by reducing calendar congestion, as well as to streamline the qualification pathways for major global tournaments such as the FIVB World Cup and the Olympic Games.

== Competing nations ==
The following national teams participated:

- Argentina
- Brazil (Hosts)
- Chile
- Colombia
- Peru
- Venezuela

== Venues ==
All Matches
Rio de Janeiro, Brazil
Ginásio do Maracanãzinho
Capacity: 11,800

== Pool standing procedure ==
1. Number of matches won
2. Match points
3. Sets ratio
4. Points ratio
5. If the tie continues as per the point ratio between two teams, the priority will be given to the team which won the last match between them. When the tie in points ratio is between three or more teams, a new classification of these teams in the terms of points 1, 2 and 3 will be made taking into consideration only the matches in which they were opposed to each other.

Match won 3–0 or 3–1: 3 match points for the winner, 0 match points for the loser
Match won 3–2: 2 match points for the winner, 1 match point for the loser

== Standing and results ==
- All times are Brasília Time (UTC−03:00).

Pos	Team	Pld	W	L	Pts	SW	SL	SR	SPW	SPL	SPR	Qualification
1st place, gold medalist(s)	Brazil (H)	5	5	0	15	15	0	MAX	392	275	1.425	Qualified for the 2027 World Cup, 2028 Summer Olympics, and 2028 South American Championship
2nd place, silver medalist(s)	Argentina	5	4	1	11	12	6	2.000	419	375	1.117	Qualified for the 2027 World Cup
3rd place, bronze medalist(s)	Colombia	5	2	3	7	9	9	1.000	408	410	0.995	Qualified for the 2027 World Cup
4	Venezuela	5	2	3	6	7	11	0.636	392	414	0.947	
5	Peru	5	1	4	3	5	13	0.385	360	434	0.829	
6	Chile	5	1	4	3	4	13	0.308	351	414	0.848	

Source: FIVB Live Center
(H) Host

Date	Time		Score		Set 1	Set 2	Set 3	Set 4	Set 5	Total	Attd	Report
8 Sep	14:00	Colombia	3–0	Chile	25–19	25–20	25–19			75–58	549	P2 Report
8 Sep	17:00	Argentina	3–1	Peru	20–25	25–15	25–18	27–25		97–83	1,670	P2 Report
8 Sep	20:00	Brazil	3–0	Venezuela	25–14	25–13	25–19			75–46	7,043	P2 Report
9 Sep	14:00	Chile	3–1	Venezuela	25–18	25–20	21–25	25–22		96–85	850	P2 Report
9 Sep	17:00	Argentina	3–2	Colombia	27–29	25–11	21–25	25–23	15–8	113–96	3,850	P2 Report
9 Sep	20:00	Brazil	3–0	Peru	25–16	25–16	25–15			75–47	6,587	P2 Report
10 Sep	14:00	Argentina	3–0	Chile	25–21	25–18	25–17			75–56	442	P2 Report
10 Sep	17:00	Venezuela	3–1	Peru	25–21	25–16	23–25	25–15		98–77	3,461	P2 Report
10 Sep	20:00	Brazil	3–0	Colombia	25–19	25–18	36–34			86–71	8,766	P2 Report
12 Sep	10:30	Argentina	3–0	Venezuela	25–23	25–20	25–21			75–64	2,950	P2 Report
12 Sep	13:30	Brazil	3–0	Chile	25–13	30–28	25–11			80–52	10,538	P2 Report
12 Sep	16:30	Colombia	3–0	Peru	25–15	25–19	25–20			75–54	950	P2 Report
13 Sep	09:00	Colombia	1–3	Venezuela	25–23	24–26	20–25	22–25		91–99	4,600	P2 Report
13 Sep	12:00	Brazil	3–0	Argentina	26–24	25–19	25–16			76–59	11,866	P2 Report
13 Sep	15:30	Chile	1–3	Peru	24–26	25–23	20–25	20–25		89–99	630	P2 Report

== Awards ==
2026 Women's South American Volleyball champions

Brazil
24th title

The following awards were given at the conclusion of the tournament:

- Most valuable player
  (Brazil) Gabriela Guimarães
- Best setter
  (Brazil) Roberta Ratzke
- Best outside spikers
  (Colombia) Ana Karina Olaya
  (Brazil) Ana Cristina de Souza
- Best middle blockers
  (Venezuela) Alejandra Argüello
  (Argentina) Candelaria Herrera
- Best opposite spiker
  (Argentina) Bianca Cugno
- Best libero
  (Argentina) Agostina Pelozo

== See also ==
- 2026 AVC Women's Volleyball Continental Championship
- 2026 Women's NORCECA Volleyball Championship
- 2026 Women's European Volleyball Championship
- 2026 Women's African Nations Volleyball Championship
- 2026 Copa Sudamericana (women's volleyball)
