= Copa Sudamericana (disambiguation) =

The Copa Sudamericana is a South American football tournament.

Copa Sudamericana may also refer to:

- Copa Sudamericana (trophy)
- Copa Sudamericana (women's volleyball)
- Copa Sudamericana (men's volleyball)
