= Volleyball at the 2026 South American Games =

Volleyball competitions at the 2026 South American Games

- Venue: Estadio Claudio Newell
- Dates: September 15–25
- Competitors: 132 from 7 nations
- Teams: 11 (6 men and 5 women)

Medalists
gold medal	Chile (men)
gold medal	Chile (women)
silver medal	Argentina (men)
silver medal	Argentina (women)
bronze medal	Colombia (men)
bronze medal	Colombia (women)

Volleyball competitions at the 2026 South American Games in Rosario, Santa Fe, and Rafaela, Argentina, are scheduled to be held between September 15 and 25 at Estadio Claudio Newell, located within Parque de la Independencia in Rosario.

Two medal events were scheduled to be contested: a men's and women's tournament. Chile and Peru are the defending champions of the South American Games men's and women's volleyball events.

== Participating nations ==
A total of 7 ODESUR nations registered teams for the volleyball events. Each nation was able to enter a maximum of 24 athletes (one team of 12 players per gender). Bolivia and Peru will only participate in the men's tournament while Venezuela will only participate in the women's. The other four nations will participate in both.

Nation	Men's	Women's
Argentina	Yes	Yes
Bolivia	Yes	—N/a
Chile	Yes	Yes
Colombia	Yes	Yes
Paraguay	Yes	Yes
Peru	Yes	—N/a
Venezuela	—N/a	Yes
Total: 7 NOCs	6/6	5/5

== Schedule ==
The competition schedule is as follows:

G	Group stage	½	Semifinals	B	Bronze medal match	F/G	Final/Gold medal match

Date Event	Tue 15	Wed 16	Thu 17	Fri 18	Sat 19	Sun 20	Mon 21	Tue 22	Wed 23	Thu 24	Fri 25	
Women	G	G	G	G	G							
Men							G	G	G	½	B	F

== Medal summary ==
=== Medal table ===
* Host nation (Argentina)

Rank	Nation	Gold	Silver	Bronze	Total
1	Chile	2	0	0	2
2	Argentina*	0	2	0	2
3	Colombia	0	0	2	2
Totals (3 entries)		2	2	2	6

=== Medalists ===
Event	Gold	Silver	Bronze
Men's tournament	Chile; Sebastián Albornoz; Noé Aravena; Gabriel Araya; Matías Banda; Dusan Bonacic; Kaj Bonacic; Jaime Bravo; Tomás Gago; Vicente Ibarra; Matías Jadue; Vicente Parraguirre; Vicente Valenzuela	Argentina; Benjamin Flores; Iñaki Ramos; Pedro Ojuez; Federico Debonis; Gustavo Maciel; Ivan Pavon; Jose Cejas; Leandro Klaczynski; Nahuén D´Aversa; German Gomez; Santiago Arroyo; Samuel Guidi	Colombia; Luis Cuenu; Leandro Mejia; Miguel Martinez; Pablo Tello; Carlos Andrés Martínez; Samuel Jaramillo; Juan Castañeda; Maicol Ortiz; Santiago Andres Ruiz; Jorge Mesa; Miguel Rodríguez; Heider Banguera
Women's tournament	Chile; Consuelo Alarcón; Dominga Aylwin; Laura Cisternas; Florencia Giglio; Daniela Maureira; María Nielsen; Beatriz Novoa; Carla Ruz; Paula Salinas; Petra Schwartzman; Celeste Somervell; Trinidad Trujillo	Argentina; Morena Chiappero; Emma Oldani; Dalma Pérez; Julieta Medina; Julieta Ruelli; Martina Bednarek; Martina Da Dalt; Victoria Caballero; Helena Cugno; Elena Guerrico; María Martínez; María Matich	Colombia; Sofía Vélez; Laura Rojas; Juliana Toro; Ivonee Montaño; Katherin Ramírez; Nicoll Torres; Danny Mesa; Melanie Gallego; Wendy Vargas; Karen Rentería; Valery Balanta; Helen Lozano

== Men's tournament ==
=== Group A ===
Pos	Team	Pld	W	L	Pts	SW	SL	SR	SPW	SPL	SPR	Qualification
1	Argentina (H)	2	2	0	6	6	0	MAX	150	103	1.456	Semifinals
2	Colombia	2	1	1	3	3	3	1.000	130	124	1.048	Semifinals
3	Bolivia	2	0	2	0	0	6	0.000	97	150	0.647	Fifth place match

Updated to match(es) played on 22 September. Source: Santa Fe 2026
Rules for classification: 1) Matches won; 2) Points; 3) Sets ratio; 4) Points ratio; 5) Head-to-head result.
(H) Host

Date	Time		Score		Set 1	Set 2	Set 3	Set 4	Set 5	Total	Attd	Report
21 Sep	15:00	Argentina	3–0	Bolivia	25–15	25–12	25–21			75–48		P2 Report
22 Sep	15:00	Argentina	3–0	Colombia	25–18	25–20	25–17			75–55		P2 Report
23 Sep	15:00	Colombia	3–0	Bolivia	25–14	25–18	25–17			75–49		P2 Report

=== Group B ===
Pos	Team	Pld	W	L	Pts	SW	SL	SR	SPW	SPL	SPR	Qualification
1	Chile	2	2	0	6	6	0	MAX	150	115	1.304	Semifinals
2	Peru	2	1	1	3	3	4	0.750	155	160	0.969	Semifinals
3	Paraguay	2	0	2	0	1	6	0.167	141	171	0.825	Fifth place match

Updated to match(es) played on 22 September. Source: Santa Fe 2026
Rules for classification: 1) Matches won; 2) Points; 3) Sets ratio; 4) Points ratio; 5) Head-to-head result.

Date	Time		Score		Set 1	Set 2	Set 3	Set 4	Set 5	Total	Attd	Report
21 Sep	10:00	Peru	3–1	Paraguay	25–22	21–25	25–18	25–20		96–85		P2 Report
22 Sep	10:00	Chile	3–0	Peru	25–23	25–17	25–19			75–59		P2 Report
23 Sep	10:00	Chile	3–0	Paraguay	25–23	25–14	25–19			75–56		P2 Report

=== Final round ===
The final round consisted of the fifth place match (between the third placed teams of pools A and B), the semi-finals and the bronze and gold medal matches. The semi-finals match-ups were:

- Semifinal 1: Winners Pool A v Runners-up Pool B
- Semifinal 2: Winners Pool B v Runners-up Pool A

Winners of semi-finals played the gold medal match, while losers played the bronze medal match.

Semi-finals
24 September
Argentina	3
Peru	0
24 September
Chile	3
Colombia	0

Gold medal match
25 September
Argentina	1
Chile	3

Fifth place match
24 September
Bolivia	0
Paraguay	3

Bronze medal match
25 September
Colombia	3
Peru	0

=== Fifth place match ===
Date	Time		Score		Set 1	Set 2	Set 3	Set 4	Set 5	Total	Attd	Report
24 Sep	10:00	Bolivia	0–3	Paraguay	16–25	13–25	17–25			46–75		P2 Report

=== Semifinals ===
Date	Time		Score		Set 1	Set 2	Set 3	Set 4	Set 5	Total	Attd	Report
24 Sep	15:00	Chile	3–0	Colombia	25–17	25–20	25–22			75–59		P2 Report
24 Sep	19:00	Argentina	3–0	Peru	25–18	25–14	31–29			81–61		P2 Report

=== Third place match ===
Date	Time		Score		Set 1	Set 2	Set 3	Set 4	Set 5	Total	Attd	Report
25 Sep	15:00	Colombia	3–0	Peru	25–23	25–19	25–23			75–65		P2 Report

=== Final ===
Date	Time		Score		Set 1	Set 2	Set 3	Set 4	Set 5	Total	Attd	Report
25 Sep	19:00	Argentina	1–3	Chile	20–25	25–22	20–25	20–25		85–97		P2 Report

== Final standings ==
2026 South American Games
Men's champions

Chile
Second title

Rank	Team
1st place, gold medalist(s)	Chile
2nd place, silver medalist(s)	Argentina
3rd place, bronze medalist(s)	Colombia
4	Peru
5	Paraguay
6	Bolivia

== Women's tournament ==
Standings

Pos	Team	Pld	W	L	Pts	SW	SL	SR	SPW	SPL	SPR	Final result
1	Chile	4	4	0	12	12	2	6.000	352	264	1.333	Gold medal
2	Argentina (H)	4	2	2	7	9	6	1.500	343	289	1.187	Silver medal
3	Colombia	4	2	2	6	6	8	0.750	319	330	0.967	Bronze medal
4	Venezuela	4	2	2	5	8	8	1.000	346	356	0.972	Fourth place
5	Paraguay	4	0	4	0	1	12	0.083	201	322	0.624	Fifth place

Source: Santa Fe 2026
Rules for classification: 1) Matches won; 2) Points; 3) Sets ratio; 4) Points ratio; 5) Head-to-head result.
(H) Host

Date	Time		Score		Set 1	Set 2	Set 3	Set 4	Set 5	Total	Attd	Report
15 Sep	16:00	Venezuela	1–3	Chile	25–23	11–25	20–25	23–25		79–98		P2 Report
15 Mar	18:00	Argentina	3–0	Paraguay	25–15	25–11	25–16			75–42	1,000	P2 Report
16 Mar	10:00	Colombia	3–1	Venezuela	27–25	20–25	27–25	30–28		104–103		P2 Report
16 Mar	15:00	Argentina	1–3	Chile	17–25	27–29	25–22	19–25		88–101		P2 Report
17 Mar	10:00	Colombia	3–1	Paraguay	27–25	20–25	25–17	25–7		97–74		P2 Report
17 Mar	15:00	Argentina	2–3	Venezuela	25–15	25–9	23–25	21–25	11–15	105–89		P2 Report
18 Mar	10:00	Chile	3–0	Colombia	28–26	25–17	25–18			78–61		P2 Report
18 Mar	15:00	Venezuela	3–0	Paraguay	25–19	25–12	25–18			75–49		P2 Report
19 Mar	15:00	Chile	3–0	Paraguay	25–13	25–11	25–12			75–36		P2 Report
19 Mar	19:00	Argentina	3–0	Colombia	25–17	25–20	25–20			75–57		P2 Report

2026 South American Games
Women's champions

Chile
First title

== See also ==
- Volleyball at the South American Games
