= 2023 Women's South American Volleyball Championship =

Tournament details
- Host country: Brazil
- City: Recife
- Dates: 19–23 August
- Teams: 5
- Venue: 1 (in 1 host city)

Final positions
- Champions: Brazil (23rd title)
- Runners-up: Argentina
- Third place: Colombia
- Fourth place: Chile

Tournament awards
- MVP: (Brazil) Gabriela Guimarães
- Best Setter: (Brazil) Roberta Ratzke
- Best OH: (Brazil) Gabriela Guimarães (Colombia) Amanda Coneo
- Best MB: (Brazil) Thaísa Menezes (Argentina) Candelaria Herrera
- Best OPP: (Brazil) Kisy Nascimento
- Best Libero: (Brazil) Nyeme Costa

The 2023 Women's South American Volleyball Championship was the 35th edition of the Women's South American Volleyball Championship held in Recife, Brazil and organised by South America's governing volleyball body, the Confederación Sudamericana de Voleibol (CSV). Top three of the tournament qualified for the 2025 FIVB Volleyball Women's World Championship as the CSV representatives.

== Competing nations ==
The following national teams participated:

- Argentina
- Brazil (Hosts)
- Chile
- Colombia
- Peru

== Venues ==
All Matches
Recife, Brazil
Ginásio de Esportes Geraldo Magalhães
Capacity: 15,000

== Pool standing procedure ==
1. Number of matches won
2. Match points
3. Sets ratio
4. Points ratio
5. If the tie continues as per the point ratio between two teams, the priority will be given to the team which won the last match between them. When the tie in points ratio is between three or more teams, a new classification of these teams in the terms of points 1, 2 and 3 will be made taking into consideration only the matches in which they were opposed to each other.

Match won 3–0 or 3–1: 3 match points for the winner, 0 match points for the loser
Match won 3–2: 2 match points for the winner, 1 match point for the loser

== Round robin ==
- All times are Brasília Time (UTC−03:00).

Pos	Team	Pld	W	L	Pts	SW	SL	SR	SPW	SPL	SPR
1	Brazil (H)	4	4	0	12	12	0	MAX	300	196	1.531
2	Argentina	4	3	1	9	9	4	2.250	304	291	1.045
3	Colombia	4	2	2	6	6	7	0.857	302	279	1.082
4	Chile	4	1	3	2	3	11	0.273	253	329	0.769
5	Peru	4	0	4	1	4	12	0.333	305	369	0.827

Source: FIVB Live Center
(H) Host

Date	Time		Score		Set 1	Set 2	Set 3	Set 4	Set 5	Total	Report
19 Aug	18:00	Argentina	3–1	Peru	25–16	24–26	25–23	25–19		99–84	Report
19 Aug	20:30	Brazil	3–0	Chile	25–13	25–11	25–21			75–45	Report
20 Aug	16:00	Chile	0–3	Colombia	10–25	24–26	13–25			47–76	Report
20 Aug	18:30	Brazil	3–0	Argentina	25–17	25–16	25–17			75–50	Report
21 Aug	18:00	Peru	1–3	Colombia	25–20	17–25	15–25	20–25		77–95	Report
21 Aug	20:30	Chile	0–3	Argentina	23–25	23–25	15–25			61–75	Report
22 Aug	18:00	Argentina	3–0	Colombia	25–20	29–27	26–24			80–71	Report
22 Aug	20:30	Brazil	3–0	Peru	25–14	25–18	25–9			75–41	Report
23 Aug	18:00	Peru	2–3	Chile	23–25	25–23	17–25	25–12	13–15	103–100	Report
23 Aug	20:30	Brazil	3–0	Colombia	25–19	25–22	25–19			75–60	Report

== Final standing ==
Rank	Team
1st place, gold medalist(s)	Brazil
2nd place, silver medalist(s)	Argentina
3rd place, bronze medalist(s)	Colombia
4	Chile
5	Peru

Qualified for the 2025 World Championship

2023 Women's South American Champions

Brazil
23rd title

== Awards ==
- Most valuable player
  (Brazil) Gabriela Guimarães
- Best setter
  (Brazil) Roberta Ratzke
- Best outside spikers
  (Brazil) Gabriela Guimarães
  (Colombia) Amanda Coneo
- Best middle blockers
  (Brazil) Thaísa Menezes
  (Argentina) Candelaria Herrera
- Best opposite spiker
  (Brazil) Kisy Nascimento
- Best libero
  (Brazil) Nyeme Costa

== See also ==
- South American Men's Volleyball Championship
- Women's U22 South American Volleyball Championship
- Women's Junior South American Volleyball Championship
- Girls' Youth South American Volleyball Championship
- Girls' U16 South American Volleyball Championship
- Volleyball at the Pan American Games
- Men's Pan-American Volleyball Cup
- Women's Pan-American Volleyball Cup
