= 2025 Copa América (women's volleyball) =

2025 Women's Volleyball Copa América
Tournament details
- Host country: Brazil
- City: Betim
- Dates: 2–6 July
- Teams: 5
- Venue: 1 (in 1 host city)

Final positions
- Champions: Argentina (1st title)
- Runners-up: Peru
- Third place: Brazil
- Fourth place: Chile

Tournament awards
- MVP: (Argentina) Bianca Cugno

Tournament statistics
- Matches played: 10
- Attendance: 8,855 (886 per match)

The 2025 Women's Volleyball Copa América was the inaugural edition of the Women's Volleyball Copa América, the annual second-tier international volleyball competition organised by the Confederación Sudamericana de Voleibol (CSV) for women's national teams of South America. It was held in Betim, Brazil from 2 to 5 July 2025.

The Copa América was announced in 2024 as a competition for teams that do not participate in the FIVB Women's Volleyball Nations League, including guest teams from North, Central America and Caribbean Volleyball Confederation (NORCECA).

Argentina won the first Copa América title after finishing first of the single group. Runners-up Peru and third-place Brazil completed the podium.

== Host and venue ==
Betim	Location of the host city in the Federative Unit of Minas Gerais
Ginásio Poliesportivo Divino Ferreira Braga	Location of the host city in the Federative Unit of Minas Gerais
Capacity: 6,000	Location of the host city in the Federative Unit of Minas Gerais

Brazil was announced as host country of the tournament on 30 May 2025, with Betim being confirmed as host city on 12 June 2025.

The competition was entirely played at the Ginásio Poliesportivo Divino Ferreira Braga.

== Teams ==
Five of the twelve CSV member associations entered the tournament. Initially Mexico had confirmed their presence as a NORCECA guest team, however, they had to decline their participation due to visa issues.

- Argentina
- Brazil (Hosts)
- Chile
- Peru
- Venezuela

Since Brazil's senior team were competing in the 2025 FIVB Women's Volleyball Nations League, they entered the tournament with an alternative squad composed of U23 players.

== Competition format ==
The competition format consisted of a single group which was played on a single round-robin basis. No finals or placement matches were played. The group standing procedure was as follows:

1. Total number of victories (matches won, matches lost);
2. Match points;
  - Match won 3–0 or 3–1: 3 points for the winner, 0 points for the loser
  - Match won 3–2: 2 points for the winner, 1 point for the loser
  - Match forfeited: 3 points for the winner, 0 points (0–25, 0–25, 0–25) for the loser
3. Sets ratio;
4. Points ratio;
5. If the tie continues between two teams: result of the last match between the tied teams. If the tie continues between three or more teams: a new classification would be made taking into consideration only the matches involving the teams in question.

== Standings ==
Pos	Team	Pld	W	L	Pts	SW	SL	SR	SPW	SPL	SPR
1	Argentina (C)	4	4	0	12	12	1	12.000	321	224	1.433
2	Peru	4	3	1	9	9	4	2.250	301	270	1.115
3	Brazil (H)	4	2	2	6	8	6	1.333	313	293	1.068
4	Chile	4	1	3	3	3	9	0.333	236	284	0.831
5	Venezuela	4	0	4	0	0	12	0.000	202	302	0.669

Source: FIVB
Rules for classification: Group standing procedure
(C) Champion; (H) Host

== Results ==
All match times are local times, BRT (UTC-3).

Date	Time		Score		Set 1	Set 2	Set 3	Set 4	Set 5	Total	Attd	Report
2 Jul	17:00	Argentina	3–0	Peru	25–13	25–22	25–19			75–54	50	P2 Report
2 Jul	20:00	Brazil	3–0	Venezuela	25–12	25–16	27–25			77–53	900	P2 Report
3 Jul	17:00	Argentina	3–0	Chile	25–21	25–17	25–14			75–52	50	P2 Report
3 Jul	20:00	Brazil	1–3	Peru	25–22	20–25	23–25	19–25		87–97	1,500	P2 Report
4 Jul	15:00	Argentina	3–0	Venezuela	25–11	25–18	25–15			75–44	55	P2 Report
4 Jul	18:00	Chile	0–3	Peru	18–25	22–25	22–25			62–75	150	P2 Report
5 Jul	13:00	Peru	3–0	Venezuela	25–22	25–9	25–15			75–46	150	P2 Report
5 Jul	16:00	Brazil	3–0	Chile	25–20	25–10	25–17			75–47	2,000	P2 Report
6 Jul	13:00	Chile	3–0	Venezuela	25–23	25–22	25–14			75–59	500	P2 Report
6 Jul	16:00	Brazil	1–3	Argentina	17–25	17–25	25–21	15–25		74–96	3,500	P2 Report

== Final standing ==
Rank	Team
1st place, gold medalist(s)	Argentina
2nd place, silver medalist(s)	Peru
3rd place, bronze medalist(s)	Brazil
4	Chile
5	Venezuela

2025 Copa América

Argentina
1st title

Team Roster:

1 Elina Rodríguez, 2 Azul Benítez, 3 Candela Salinas, 6 Bianca Bertolino, 9 Bianca Cugno, 10 Daniela Bulaich, 11 Bianca Farriol, 12 Avril García, 14 Victoria Mayer (C), 15 Antonela Fortuna (L), 18 Martina Bednarek, 19 Brenda Graff, 20 Agostina Pelozo (L), 21 Micaela Cabrera.

Head coach: (Argentina) Facundo Morando

== Individual awards ==
The following individual awards were presented at the end of the tournament.

- Most valuable player (MVP)

Bianca Cugno (ARG)

- Best middle blockers

Bianca Farriol (ARG)
Diana de la Peña (PER)

- Best setter

Victoria Mayer (ARG)

- Best opposite spiker

Bianca Cugno (ARG)

- Best outside spikers

Kiara Montes (PER)
Ana Luiza Rüdiger (BRA)

- Best libero

Lelê (BRA)

== See also ==
- 2025 Copa América (men's volleyball)
