= 2025 Copa América (men's volleyball) =

2025 Men's Volleyball Copa América
Tournament details
- Host country: Brazil
- City: Betim
- Dates: 25–29 June
- Teams: 5
- Venue: 1 (in 1 host city)

Final positions
- Champions: Brazil (1st title)
- Runners-up: Argentina
- Third place: Venezuela
- Fourth place: Chile

Tournament awards
- MVP: (Brazil) Paulo Vinicios Silva

Tournament statistics
- Matches played: 10
- Attendance: 8,919 (892 per match)

The 2025 Men's Volleyball Copa América was the inaugural edition of the Copa América, the annual second-tier international volleyball competition organised by the Confederación Sudamericana de Voleibol (CSV) for men's national teams of South America. It was held in Betim, Brazil from 25 to 29 June 2025.

The Copa América was announced in 2024 as a competition for teams that do not participate in the FIVB Men's Volleyball Nations League, including guest teams from North, Central America and Caribbean Volleyball Confederation (NORCECA).

Brazil won the first Copa América title after finishing first of the single group. Runners-up Argentina and third-place Venezuela completed the podium.

== Host and venue ==
Betim	Location of the host city in the Federative Unit of Minas Gerais
Ginásio Poliesportivo Divino Ferreira Braga	Location of the host city in the Federative Unit of Minas Gerais
Capacity: 6,000	Location of the host city in the Federative Unit of Minas Gerais

Brazil was announced as host country of the tournament on 30 May 2025, with Betim being confirmed as host city on 12 June 2025.

The competition was entirely played at the Ginásio Poliesportivo Divino Ferreira Braga.

== Teams ==
Five of the twelve CSV member associations entered the tournament. Initially Mexico had confirmed their presence as a NORCECA guest team, however, they had to decline their participation due to visa issues.

- Argentina
- Brazil (Hosts)
- Chile
- Peru
- Venezuela

Since Argentina and Brazil were playing in the 2025 FIVB Men's Volleyball Nations League, both fielded alternate teams. Argentina fielded a squad of U21 and senior players, while Brazil fielded a combination of U23, U26 and senior players.

== Competition format ==
The competition format consisted of a single group which was played on a single round-robin basis. No finals or placement matches were played. The group standing procedure was as follows:

1. Total number of victories (matches won, matches lost);
2. Match points;
  - Match won 3–0 or 3–1: 3 points for the winner, 0 points for the loser
  - Match won 3–2: 2 points for the winner, 1 point for the loser
  - Match forfeited: 3 points for the winner, 0 points (0–25, 0–25, 0–25) for the loser
3. Sets ratio;
4. Points ratio;
5. If the tie continues between two teams: result of the last match between the tied teams. If the tie continues between three or more teams: a new classification would be made taking into consideration only the matches involving the teams in question.

== Standings ==
Pos	Team	Pld	W	L	Pts	SW	SL	SR	SPW	SPL	SPR
1	Brazil (H, C)	4	4	0	12	12	0	MAX	304	243	1.251
2	Argentina	4	3	1	9	9	5	1.800	324	310	1.045
3	Venezuela	4	2	2	6	7	7	1.000	330	314	1.051
4	Chile	4	1	3	3	5	9	0.556	305	323	0.944
5	Peru	4	0	4	0	0	12	0.000	227	300	0.757

Source: FIVB
Rules for classification: Group standing procedure
(C) Champion; (H) Host

=== Results ===
All match times are local times, BRT (UTC-3).

Date	Time		Score		Set 1	Set 2	Set 3	Set 4	Set 5	Total	Attd	Report
25 Jun	17:00	Chile	3–0	Peru	25–15	25–21	25–20			75–56	100	P2 Report
25 Jun	20:00	Brazil	3–0	Venezuela	25–22	25–21	28–26			78–69	300	P2 Report
26 Jun	17:00	Argentina	3–1	Venezuela	25–22	25–17	19–25	26–24		95–88	200	P2 Report
26 Jun	20:00	Brazil	3–0	Peru	25–18	25–13	25–20			75–51	1,219	P2 Report
27 Jun	15:00	Argentina	3–1	Chile	25–17	19–25	25–23	25–16		94–81	100	P2 Report
27 Jun	18:00	Peru	0–3	Venezuela	19–25	15–25	21–25			55–75	200	P2 Report
28 Jun	13:00	Argentina	3–0	Peru	25–22	25–20	25–23			75–65	500	P2 Report
28 Jun	16:00	Brazil	3–0	Chile	25–20	25–20	25–23			75–63	1,500	P2 Report
29 Jun	13:00	Chile	1–3	Venezuela	25–22	15–25	22–25	24–26		86–98	800	P2 Report
29 Jun	16:00	Brazil	3–0	Argentina	25–21	25–14	26–24			76–59	4,000	P2 Report

== Final standing ==
Rank	Team
1st place, gold medalist(s)	Brazil
2nd place, silver medalist(s)	Argentina
3rd place, bronze medalist(s)	Venezuela
4	Chile
5	Peru

2025 Copa América

Brazil
1st title

Team Roster:

1 Leo Lukas, 2 Gustavo Cardoso, 3 Gabriel Ostapechen, 5 Luiz Ricardo (L), 6 Guilherme Amorim, 7 Paulo Vinicios Silva (C), 8 Guilherme Sabino, 9 Geovane Kuhnen, 10 Witallo, 12 Gabriel Bieler, 14 Matheus Pedrosa, 16 Mateus Pássaro (L), 18 Samuel Neufeld, 20 Pietro Santos.

Head coach: (Brazil) Fabiano Magoo

== Individual awards ==
The following individual awards were presented at the end of the tournament.

- Most valuable player (MVP)

Paulo Vinicios Silva (BRA)

- Best middle blockers

Pietro Santos (BRA)
Imanol Salazar (ARG)

- Best setter

Gabriel Bieler (BRA)

- Best opposite spiker

Pablo César Denis (ARG)

- Best outside spikers

Willner Rivas (VEN)
Paulo Vinicios Silva (BRA)

- Best libero

Luiz Ricardo (BRA)

== See also ==
- 2025 Copa América (women's volleyball)
