= Elina Maria Rodríguez =

Argentinean volleyball player (born 1997)

Elina Rodríguez

Personal information
- Full name: Elina María Rodríguez
- Nickname: Eli
- Born: February 11, 1997 (age 29); Santa Fé, Argentina
- Height: 189 cm (6 ft 2 in)
- Weight: 72 kg (159 lb)
- Spike: 300 cm (118 in)
- Block: 2.84 m (112 in)

Volleyball information
- Position: Outside hitter
- Current club: (France) Paris Saint-Cloud
- Number: 6

Career
| Years | Teams |
|---|---|
| 2014-17 | (Argentina) San Lorenzo |
| 2018-19 | (Brazil) Hinode Barueri |
| 2018-19 | (Italy) Imoco Volley Conegliano |
| 2019-20 | (Italy) LPM BAM Mondovì |
| 2020-21 | (France) Vandœuvre Nancy Volley-Ball |
| 2021-22 | (France) Paris Saint-Cloud |

National team
| 2015- | Argentina |
Honours
Women's volleyball
Representing Argentina
Pan American Games
| Bronze medal – third place | 2019 Lima | Team |
Pan-American Cup
| Gold medal – first place | 2024 León/Irapuato | Team |

Elina Maria Rodríguez is an Argentine volleyball player. She is part of the Argentina women's national volleyball team. She competed at the 2020 Summer Olympics.
