= 2026 Copa Sudamericana (men's volleyball) =

2026 Men's Volleyball Copa Sudamericana
Tournament details
- Host country: Bolivia
- City: Cochabamba
- Dates: 5–9 August
- Teams: 8
- Venue: 1 (in 1 host city)

Final positions
- Champions: Argentina (1st title)
- Runners-up: Brazil
- Third place: Colombia
- Fourth place: Chile

Tournament awards
- MVP: (Argentina) Federico Arquez

Tournament statistics
- Matches played: 20

The 2026 Men's Volleyball Copa Sudamericana is the second edition of the Men's Volleyball Copa Sudamericana, the annual second-tier international volleyball competition organised by the Confederación Sudamericana de Voleibol (CSV) for men's national teams of South America. It was held in Cochabamba, Bolivia from 5 to 9 August 2026 and it was co-organized by the Bolivian Volleyball Federation and the Club Olympic.

Starting with this edition, the tournament was rebranded Copa Sudamericana instead of Copa América, the name it was known by in the inaugural edition.

The tournament served as qualifiers for other two international competitions. The top four teams—other than Brazil and Argentina—qualified for the 2026 Men's South American Volleyball Championship in Rio de Janeiro, Brazil, while Brazil and Argentina qualified automatically as the hosts and the top-ranked team in the FIVB Men's World Ranking (aside from Brazil), respectively. The top team—other than Peru and Brazil—qualified for the 2027 Pan American Games men's volleyball tournament in Lima, Peru, while Peru and Brazil qualified automatically as the hosts and the 2025 Junior Pan American Games men's volleyball tournament champions, respectively.

Argentina won their first Copa Sudamericana title by beating runners-up and defending champion Brazil 3–2 in the final. Colombia defeated Chile 3–0 in the third-place match. Colombia, Chile, Bolivia and Venezuela qualified for the 2026 Men's South American Championship, with Argentina also qualifying for the 2027 Pan American Games men's volleyball tournament.

== Host and venue ==
Cochabamba	Location of venue in Cochabamba Department.
Coliseo de La Coronilla	Location of venue in Cochabamba Department.
Capacity: 10,000	Location of venue in Cochabamba Department.

In April 2026, Bernardo Pavisic, president of the Club Olympic announced Cochabamba, Bolivia as the host city for the tournament, which was confirmed by the CSV in June 2026.

The competition is entirely played at the Coliseo de La Coronilla.

== Teams ==
Eight of the twelve CSV member associations entered the tournament.

Team	App	Previous best performance
Argentina	2nd	Runners-up (2025)
Bolivia (hosts)	1st	None (Debut)
Brazil (holders)	2nd	Champions (2025)
Chile	2nd	Fourth place (2025)
Colombia	1st	None (Debut)
Paraguay	1st	None (Debut)
Peru	2nd	Fifth place (2025)
Venezuela	2nd	Third place (2025)

Both Brazil and Argentina decided to send an alternate team made up of a mix of senior players and several youth players, since their main teams had just competed in the 2026 FIVB Men's Volleyball Nations League.

== Competition format ==
The competition format consisted of a two groups of four teams each, which were played on a single round-robin basis in the preliminary round. The group standing procedure was as follows:

1. Total number of victories (matches won, matches lost);
2. Match points;
  - Match won 3–0 or 3–1: 3 points for the winner, 0 points for the loser
  - Match won 3–2: 2 points for the winner, 1 point for the loser
  - Match forfeited: 3 points for the winner, 0 points (0–25, 0–25, 0–25) for the loser
3. Sets ratio;
4. Points ratio;
5. If the tie continues between two teams: result of the last match between the tied teams. If the tie continues between three or more teams: a new classification would be made taking into consideration only the matches involving the teams in question.

Once the preliminary round is completed, the top two teams in each group advance to the semi-finals, while the third and fourth placed teams advanced to the semi-finals for 5th to 8th places. The winners of the semi-finals advance to the final to define the champions while the losers of the semi-finals decide third and fourth place. Winners of the 5th to 8th semi-finals play for the fifth and sixth place while losers play for seventh and eighth place.

== Premilimary round ==
All match times are local, BOT (UTC-4).

=== Group A ===
Pos	Team	Pld	W	L	Pts	SW	SL	SR	SPW	SPL	SPR	Qualification
1	Argentina	3	3	0	9	9	2	4.500	277	240	1.154	Semi-finals
2	Chile	3	2	1	6	7	3	2.333	247	208	1.188	Semi-finals
3	Bolivia (H)	3	1	2	3	3	6	0.500	193	210	0.919	5th–8th semi-finals
4	Peru	3	0	3	0	1	9	0.111	190	249	0.763	5th–8th semi-finals

Source: FIVB
Rules for classification: Group standing procedure
(H) Host

Date	Time		Score		Set 1	Set 2	Set 3	Set 4	Set 5	Total	Attd	Report
5 Aug	13:00	Chile	3–0	Peru	25–15	25–16	25–16			75–47		P2 Report
5 Aug	20:30	Argentina	3–0	Bolivia	25–16	25–22	25–22			75–60		P2 Report
6 Aug	18:00	Chile	3–0	Bolivia	27–25	25–18	25–15			77–58		P2 Report
6 Aug	20:30	Argentina	3–1	Peru	23–25	25–17	26–24	25–19		99–85		P2 Report
7 Aug	18:00	Bolivia	3–0	Peru	25–21	25–20	25–17			75–58		P2 Report
7 Aug	20:30	Argentina	3–1	Chile	26–24	27–29	25–20	25–22		103–95		P2 Report

=== Group B ===
Pos	Team	Pld	W	L	Pts	SW	SL	SR	SPW	SPL	SPR	Qualification
1	Brazil	3	3	0	9	9	1	9.000	245	206	1.189	Semi-finals
2	Colombia	3	2	1	6	7	4	1.750	266	233	1.142	Semi-finals
3	Venezuela	3	1	2	3	4	7	0.571	241	249	0.968	5th–8th semi-finals
4	Paraguay	3	0	3	0	1	9	0.111	183	247	0.741	5th–8th semi-finals

Source: FIVB
Rules for classification: Group standing procedure

Date	Time		Score		Set 1	Set 2	Set 3	Set 4	Set 5	Total	Attd	Report
5 Aug	15:30	Brazil	3–0	Paraguay	25–16	25–19	25–15			75–50		P2 Report
5 Aug	18:00	Colombia	3–1	Venezuela	23–25	25–14	25–22	25–20		98–81		P2 Report
6 Aug	13:00	Colombia	3–0	Paraguay	25–20	25–20	25–17			75–57		P2 Report
6 Aug	15:30	Brazil	3–0	Venezuela	25–23	25–22	25–18			75–63		P2 Report
7 Aug	13:00	Venezuela	3–1	Paraguay	25–18	25–19	22–25	25–14		97–76		P2 Report
7 Aug	15:30	Brazil	3–1	Colombia	26–24	19–25	25–23	25–21		95–93		P2 Report

== Final round ==
=== 5th–8th places ===
5th–8th semi-finals
8 August
Venezuela	3
Peru	1
8 August
Bolivia	3
Paraguay	1

5th place match
9 August
Venezuela	1
Bolivia	3
7th place match
9 August
Peru	3
Paraguay	0

==== 5th–8th semi-finals ====
Date	Time		Score		Set 1	Set 2	Set 3	Set 4	Set 5	Total	Attd	Report
8 Aug	13:00	Venezuela	3–1	Peru	25–22	10–25	25–23	25–23		85–93		P2 Report
8 Aug	20:30	Bolivia	3–1	Paraguay	25–19	22–25	25–18	25–13		97–75		P2 Report

==== 7th place match ====
Date	Time		Score		Set 1	Set 2	Set 3	Set 4	Set 5	Total	Attd	Report
9 Aug	9:00	Peru	3–0	Paraguay	25–18	25–18	25–17			75–53		P2 Report

==== 5th place match ====
Date	Time		Score		Set 1	Set 2	Set 3	Set 4	Set 5	Total	Attd	Report
9 Aug	14:00	Venezuela	1–3	Bolivia	25–18	22–25	23–25	23–25		93–93		P2 Report

=== 1st–4th places ===
Semi-finals
8 August
Argentina	3
Colombia	1
8 August
Brazil	3
Chile	2

Final
9 August
Argentina	3
Brazil	2
3rd place match
9 August
Colombia	3
Chile	0

==== Semi-finals ====
Date	Time		Score		Set 1	Set 2	Set 3	Set 4	Set 5	Total	Attd	Report
8 Aug	15:30	Argentina	3–1	Colombia	23–25	28–26	27–25	25–15		103–91		P2 Report
8 Aug	18:00	Brazil	3–2	Chile	25–17	23–25	23–25	25–13	19–17	115–97		P2 Report

==== 3rd place match ====
Date	Time		Score		Set 1	Set 2	Set 3	Set 4	Set 5	Total	Attd	Report
9 Aug	11:30	Colombia	3–0	Chile	25–23	27–25	25–22			77–70		P2 Report

==== Final ====
Date	Time		Score		Set 1	Set 2	Set 3	Set 4	Set 5	Total	Attd	Report
9 Aug	16:30	Argentina	3–2	Brazil	21–25	25–21	20–25	25–20	15–10	106–101		P2 Report

== Final standing ==
Rank	Team
1st place, gold medalist(s)	Argentina
2nd place, silver medalist(s)	Brazil
3rd place, bronze medalist(s)	Colombia
4	Chile
5	Bolivia
6	Venezuela
7	Peru
8	Paraguay

2026 Copa Sudamericana

Argentina
1st title

Team Roster:

1 Santiago Arroyo (L), 2 Lucas Conde, 4 Iñaki Ramos, 5 Ignacio Luengas (C), 6 Iván Pavón, 8 Lucas Astegiano, 9 Federico Debonis, 11 Federico Arquez, 12 Imanol Salazar, 19 Leandro Klaczynski, 22 Pedro Agustín Ojuez, 25 Gustavo Maciel, 66 Pablo Denis Cabañas, 67 Samuel Guidi.

Head coach: (Argentina) Damian Arredondo

== Individual awards ==
The following individual awards were presented at the end of the tournament.

- Most valuable player (MVP)

Federico Arquez (ARG)

- Best middle blockers

Daniel Aponza (COL)
Gustavo Maciel (ARG)

- Best setter

Gabriel Bieler (BRA)

- Best opposite spiker

Miguel Amaranto (COL)

- Best outside spikers

Maicon França (BRA)
Pablo Choque (BOL)

- Best libero

Santiago Arroyo (ARG)

== See also ==
- 2026 AVC Men's Volleyball Cup
- 2026 Men's European Volleyball League
- 2026 Men's South American Volleyball Championship
