= 2024 Women's Pan-American Volleyball Cup =

Tournament details
- Host country: Mexico
- Cities: León; Irapuato
- Dates: 18–25 August
- Teams: 12 (from 2 confederations)
- Venues: 2 (in 2 host cities)

Final positions
- Champions: Argentina (2nd title)
- Runners-up: United States
- Third place: Colombia
- Fourth place: Dominican Republic

Tournament awards
- MVP: (Argentina) Bianca Farriol
- Best Setter: (Mexico) Karen Rivera
- Best OH: (Colombia) Ana Karina Olaya (United States) Veronica Perry
- Best MB: (Argentina) Bianca Farriol (Dominican Republic) Cándida Arias
- Best OPP: (United States) Kendall Kipp
- Best Libero: (Colombia) Camila Gómez

Tournament statistics
- Matches played: 44

The 2024 Women's Pan-American Volleyball Cup, officially named 2024 NORCECA XVII Panamerican Women Cup, was the 21st edition of the Women's Pan-American Volleyball Cup, the annual volleyball tournament organized by the Pan-American Volleyball Union (UPV) that brings together the NORCECA and Confederación Sudamericana de Voleibol (CSV) women's national teams. It was held in Mexico from 18 to 25 August 2024.

Argentina were the defending champions.

== Host cities and venues ==
León	Locations of host cities in the state of Guanajuato.	Irapuato
Domo de la Feria	Locations of host cities in the state of Guanajuato.	Inforum
Capacity: 4,463	Locations of host cities in the state of Guanajuato.	Capacity: 6,000

León was announced as the host city for the tournament in January 2024 while Irapuato was confirmed as the second host city at a later date, both located in the state of Guanajuato. This was the eleventh time that Mexico hosts the tournament, most recent in 2022.

Domo de la Feria in León and Inforum Irapuato in Irapuato were the venues of the competition.

== Participating teams ==
A maximum of 12 national teams could qualify for the tournament based on their respective continental ranking plus the points earned during their participation in the 2023 Pan-American Cup, as follows: the host nation, the top 7 teams in the NORCECA Continental Ranking as of 1 January 2024 and the top 4 teams in the CSV Continental Ranking that confirmed their participation.

The following were the teams eligible to participate in the tournament (teams that confirmed their participation marked in bold and confederation ranking, if given, shown in brackets):

NORCECA (North, Central America and Caribbean Volleyball Confederation)

- **United States** (1)
- **Dominican Republic** (2)
- **Puerto Rico** (3)
- **Canada** (4)
- **Mexico** (5, hosts)
- **Cuba** (6)
- **Costa Rica** (7)
- **Suriname** (15)
- ~~Guatemala~~ (18)

CSV (South American Volleyball Confederation)

- ~~Brazil~~
- **Argentina** (holders)
- **Colombia**
- **Chile**
- **Peru**
- ~~Venezuela~~

=== Squads ===
Each national team had to register a squad with a minimum of 12 and a maximum of 14 players.

== Competition format ==
In the Pan-American Cups the competition format depends on the number of participating teams. With 12 teams, two groups of six teams each were formed. The pool standing procedure was as follows:

1. Number of matches won;
2. Match points;
  - Match won 3–0: 5 match points for the winner, 0 match points for the loser
  - Match won 3–1: 4 match points for the winner, 1 match points for the loser
  - Match won 3–2: 3 match points for the winner, 2 match point for the loser
3. Points ratio;
4. Sets ratio;
5. If the tie continues between two teams: result of the last match between the tied teams;
6. If the tie continues between three or more teams: a new classification would be made taking into consideration only the matches between involved teams.

The winner of each group advanced directly to the semi-finals, while the runners-up and the third placed teams advanced to the quarter-finals.

=== Groups composition ===
Teams were distributed into two groups of six teams. As hosts, Mexico had the right to choose the group in which to be placed and were assigned to the head of its group (Group A). The remaining teams were distributed into the groups according to their position in the NORCECA and CSV Continental Rankings (as of 1 January 2024) and taking into account the points earned in the 2023 Pan-American Cup, following the serpentine system and starting with the highest-ranked NORCECA team as head of the remaining group (Group A)

Group A	Group B
Mexico	United States
Dominican Republic	Argentina
Colombia	Puerto Rico
Canada	Chile
Peru	Cuba
Suriname	Costa Rica

Mexico also had the right to choose their first match in the preliminary round and propose the times and order of all matches.

== Preliminary round ==
Group A took place at Domo de la Feria in León, while Group B took place at Inforum Irapuato in Irapuato. All match times are local times, CST (UTC−6), as listed by NORCECA.

=== Group A ===
Pos	Team	Pld	W	L	Pts	SPW	SPL	SPR	SW	SL	SR	Qualification
1	Colombia	5	4	1	21	444	366	1.213	14	4	3.500	Semi-finals
2	Dominican Republic	5	4	1	18	444	364	1.220	13	6	2.167	Quarter-finals
3	Mexico (H)	5	3	2	13	471	440	1.070	11	10	1.100	Quarter-finals
4	Peru	5	2	3	12	437	401	1.090	9	10	0.900	7th–10th semi-finals
5	Canada	5	2	3	11	397	391	1.015	8	10	0.800	7th–10th semi-finals
6	Suriname	5	0	5	0	144	375	0.384	0	15	0.000	11th place match

Source: NORCECA
(H) Host

Date	Time		Score		Set 1	Set 2	Set 3	Set 4	Set 5	Total	Report
18 Aug	14:00	Dominican Republic	1–3	Peru	25–27	14–25	25–15	15–25		79–92	P2 P3
18 Aug	17:00	Colombia	3–0	Canada	27–25	25–21	25–18			77–64	P2 P3
18 Aug	20:00	Mexico	3–0	Suriname	25–6	25–12	25–10			75–28	P2 P3
19 Aug	14:00	Colombia	3–0	Suriname	25–4	25–12	25–9			75–25	P2 P3
19 Aug	17:00	Peru	1–3	Canada	25–22	24–26	21–25	23–25		93–98	P2 P3
19 Aug	20:00	Mexico	1–3	Dominican Republic	21–25	20–25	28–26	16–25		85–101	P2 P3
20 Aug	14:00	Dominican Republic	3–0	Suriname	25–7	25–13	25–4			75–24	P2 P3
20 Aug	17:00	Colombia	3–0	Peru	25–19	25–18	35–33			85–70	P2 P3
20 Aug	20:00	Mexico	3–2	Canada	19–25	25–19	23–25	26–24	15–12	108–105	P2 P3
21 Aug	14:00	Canada	3–0	Suriname	25–16	25–9	25–13			75–38	P2 P3
21 Aug	17:00	Dominican Republic	3–2	Colombia	18–25	25–17	28–26	28–30	15–10	114–108	P2 P3
21 Aug	20:00	Mexico	3–2	Peru	22–25	25–23	25–23	23–25	15–11	110–107	P2 P3
22 Aug	11:00	Peru	3–0	Suriname	25–10	25–11	25–8			75–29	P2 P3
22 Aug	14:00	Dominican Republic	3–0	Canada	25–15	25–23	25–17			75–55	P2 P3
22 Aug	17:00	Mexico	1–3	Colombia	24–26	23–25	25–23	21–25		93–99	P2 P3

=== Group B ===
Pos	Team	Pld	W	L	Pts	SPW	SPL	SPR	SW	SL	SR	Qualification
1	United States	5	5	0	23	417	282	1.479	15	2	7.500	Semi-finals
2	Argentina	5	4	1	21	385	306	1.258	13	3	4.333	Quarter-finals
3	Puerto Rico	5	3	2	11	381	399	0.955	9	10	0.900	Quarter-finals
4	Cuba	5	2	3	13	387	384	1.008	9	9	1.000	7th–10th semi-finals
5	Chile	5	1	4	7	315	377	0.836	5	12	0.417	7th–10th semi-finals
6	Costa Rica	5	0	5	0	238	375	0.635	0	15	0.000	11th place match

Source: NORCECA

Date	Time		Score		Set 1	Set 2	Set 3	Set 4	Set 5	Total	Report
18 Aug	14:00	Argentina	3–0	Costa Rica	25–16	25–14	25–22			75–52	P2 P3
18 Aug	17:00	Puerto Rico	3–2	Cuba	25–22	15–25	22–25	28–26	15–8	105–106	P2 P3
18 Aug	20:00	United States	3–0	Chile	25–13	25–16	25–18			75–47	P2 P3
19 Aug	14:00	Cuba	3–0	Costa Rica	25–18	25–19	25–18			75–55	P2 P3
19 Aug	17:00	Argentina	3–0	Chile	25–23	25–13	25–8			75–44	P2 P3
19 Aug	20:00	United States	3–0	Puerto Rico	25–14	25–20	25–15			75–49	P2 P3
20 Aug	14:00	Chile	3–0	Costa Rica	25–9	25–22	25–20			75–51	P2 P3
20 Aug	17:00	Puerto Rico	0–3	Argentina	16–25	19–25	16–25			51–75	P2 P3
20 Aug	20:00	United States	3–1	Cuba	21–25	25–12	25–21	25–10		96–68	P2 P3
21 Aug	14:00	United States	3–0	Costa Rica	25–8	25–12	25–15			75–35	P2 P3
21 Aug	17:00	Puerto Rico	3–2	Chile	18–25	25–19	25–20	18–25	15–9	101–98	P2 P3
21 Aug	20:00	Cuba	0–3	Argentina	25–27	15–25	23–25			63–77	P2 P3
22 Aug	11:00	Puerto Rico	3–0	Costa Rica	25–12	25–14	25–19			75–45	P2 P3
22 Aug	14:00	Chile	0–3	Cuba	18–25	15–25	18–25			51–75	P2 P3
22 Aug	17:00	Argentina	1–3	United States	19–25	18–25	25–21	21–25		83–96	P2 P3

== Final round ==
All match times are local times, CT (UTC−6), as listed by NORCECA.

=== 5th–12th places ===
The 5th to 12th placement matches were played at Inforum Irapuato in Irapuato.

7th–10th quarter-finals
23 August
4B	Cuba	1
5A	Canada	3
23 August
4A	Peru	2
5B	Chile	3

5th–8th semi-finals
24 August
5A	Canada	2
3B	Puerto Rico	3
24 August
5B	Chile	1
3A	Mexico	3

5th place match
25 August
Puerto Rico	1
Mexico	3

11th place match
23 August
Suriname	0
Costa Rica	3

9th place match
24 August
Cuba	3
Peru	0

7th place match
25 August
Canada	3
Chile	0

==== 7th–10th quarter-finals ====
Winners advanced to the 5th–8th semi-finals where they faced the quarter-finals losers. Losers played the 9th place match.

Date	Time		Score		Set 1	Set 2	Set 3	Set 4	Set 5	Total	Report
23 Aug	17:00	Cuba	1–3	Canada	25–27	25–20	19–25	24–26		93–98	P2 P3
23 Aug	20:00	Peru	2–3	Chile	20–25	28–26	26–28	25–19	8–15	107–113	P2 P3

==== 5th–8th semi-finals ====
Date	Time		Score		Set 1	Set 2	Set 3	Set 4	Set 5	Total	Report
24 Aug	14:00	Canada	2–3	Puerto Rico	25–16	16–25	16–25	25–16	10–15	92–97	P2 P3
24 Aug	17:00	Chile	1–3	Mexico	26–28	12–25	25–22	14–25		77–100	P2 P3

==== 11th place match ====
Date	Time		Score		Set 1	Set 2	Set 3	Set 4	Set 5	Total	Report
23 Aug	14:00	Suriname	0–3	Costa Rica	15–25	13–25	13–25			41–75	P2 P3

==== 9th place match ====
Date	Time		Score		Set 1	Set 2	Set 3	Set 4	Set 5	Total	Report
24 Aug	20:00	Cuba	3–0	Peru	25–20	25–12	25–21			75–53	P2 P3

==== 7th place match ====
Date	Time		Score		Set 1	Set 2	Set 3	Set 4	Set 5	Total	Report
25 Aug	17:00	Canada	3–0	Chile	25–23	25–23	25–20			75–66	P2 P3

==== 5th place match ====
Date	Time		Score		Set 1	Set 2	Set 3	Set 4	Set 5	Total	Report
25 Aug	20:00	Puerto Rico	1–3	Mexico	20–25	25–15	19–25	16–25		80–90	P2 P3

=== 1st–4th places ===
The 1st to 4th placement matches were played at Domo de la Feria in León.

Quarter-finals
19 July
2A	Dominican Republic	3
3B	Puerto Rico	2
19 July
2B	Argentina	3
3A	Mexico	2

Semi-finals
20 July
1B	United States	3
2A	Dominican Republic	0
20 July
1A	Colombia	1
2B	Argentina	3

Final
21 July
United States	0
Argentina	3
3rd place match
21 July
Dominican Republic	0
Colombia	3

==== Quarter-finals ====
Winners advanced to the semifinals, while the losers advanced to compete for the 5th to 8th places.

Date	Time		Score		Set 1	Set 2	Set 3	Set 4	Set 5	Total	Report
23 Aug	17:00	Dominican Republic	3–2	Puerto Rico	19–25	24–26	25–23	27–25	15–8	110–107	P2 P3
23 Aug	20:00	Argentina	3–2	Mexico	15–25	21–25	25–17	25–13	15–12	101–92	P2 P3

==== Semi-finals ====
Date	Time		Score		Set 1	Set 2	Set 3	Set 4	Set 5	Total	Report
24 Aug	17:00	United States	3–0	Dominican Republic	25–18	25–23	28–26			78–67	P2 P3
24 Aug	20:00	Colombia	1–3	Argentina	25–15	26–28	18–25	23–25		92–93	P2 P3

==== 3rd place match ====
Date	Time		Score		Set 1	Set 2	Set 3	Set 4	Set 5	Total	Report
25 Aug	17:00	Dominican Republic	0–3	Colombia	18–25	19–25	14–25			51–75	P2 P3

==== Final ====
Date	Time		Score		Set 1	Set 2	Set 3	Set 4	Set 5	Total	Report
25 Aug	20:00	United States	0–3	Argentina	18–25	20–25	19–25			57–75	P2 P3

== See also ==
- 2024 Men's Pan-American Volleyball Cup
