= Candelaria Herrera =

Argentine volleyball player (born 1999)

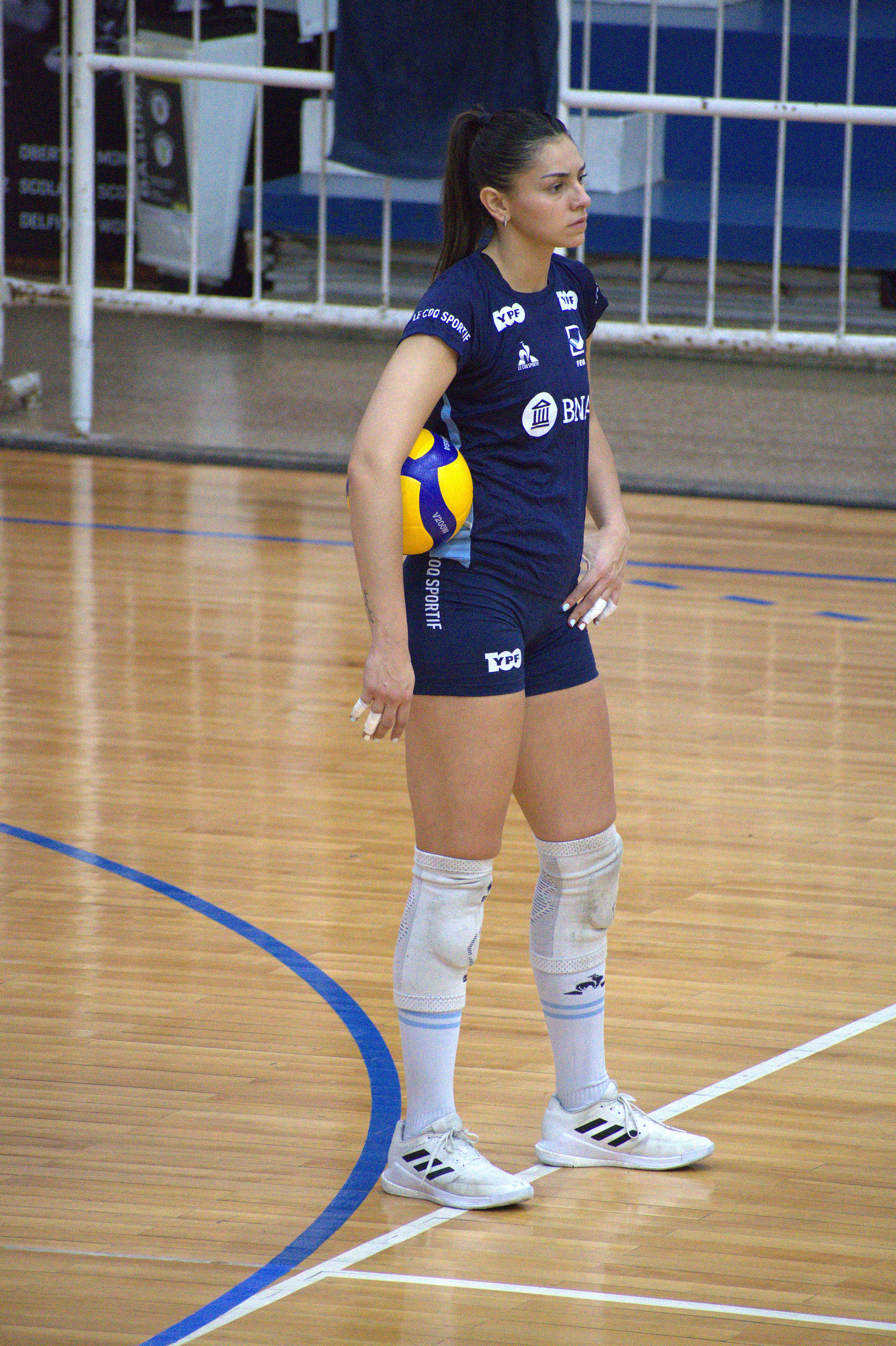
- Herrera in 2022

Personal information
- Full name: Candelaria Lucía Herrera Rodríguez
- Nationality: Argentina
- Born: 28 January 1999 (age 27); San Juan
- Height: 1.84 m (6 ft 0 in)
- Weight: 79 kg (174 lb)
- Spike: 319 cm (126 in)
- Block: 300 cm (118 in)
- Education: Iowa State University

Volleyball information
- Position: Middle blocker
- Current club: LOVB Omaha
- Number: 17

Career
Years	Teams
2020–2021; 2021–2024; 2024–	Gimnasia y Esgrima La Plata; Levallois Paris Saint-Cloud; LOVB Omaha

National team
2016–	Argentina
Honours
Pan American Games
Bronze medal – third place	2019 Lima	Team
Pan-American Cup
Gold medal – first place	2023 Ponce	Team
Gold medal – first place	2024 León/Irapuato	Team
South American Championship
Silver medal – second place	2023 Recife	Team

Candelaria Lucía Herrera Rodríguez (Note: In this Spanish name, the first or paternal surname is Herrera and the second or maternal family name is Rodríguez.) (born 28 January 1999 San Juan, Argentina) is an Argentine volleyball player who participated with the Argentina national team. She competed at the 2020 Summer Olympics.

== Career ==
She participated at the 2016 Women's Pan-American Volleyball Cup. She qualified for the 2020 Summer Olympics.

She played for Florida A&M University, and Iowa State University.
