= Copa Sudamericana (women's volleyball) =

South American volleyball competition

- Most recent season or competition: 2026 Copa Sudamericana (women's volleyball)
- Sport: Volleyball
- Founded: 2024; 2 years ago
- First season: 2025
- No. of teams: 8
- Continent: South America (CSV)
- Most recent champion: Brazil (1st title)
- Most titles: Argentina; Brazil (1 title each)

The Women's Volleyball Copa Sudamericana is an annual international volleyball competition organized by the Confederación Sudamericana de Voleibol (CSV) for senior women's national volleyball teams of South America. It is the women's second-tier competition ranking below the Women's South American Volleyball Championship.

The creation of the Copa Sudamericana (then called Copa América) was announced on 13 July 2024 by President Marco Tullio Teixeira during the 76th Ordinary Congress of the CSV in Belo Horizonte, Brazil. The tournament would feature some invited teams from the North, Central America and Caribbean Volleyball Confederation (NORCECA) and would be played annually during the dates of the FIVB Women's Volleyball Nations League, in order to give competition opportunities to the teams that do not participate at this tournament.Those that are participating can also send in their teams.

Starting with its second edition in 2026, the tournament adopted its current name, the Copa Sudamericana, replacing the name Copa América that was used in the inaugural edition in 2025.

A corresponding tournament for male players is the Men's Volleyball Copa Sudamericana.

== Results summary ==
Year	Host	Final			3rd place match			Teams
Year	Host	Champions	Score	Runners-up	3rd place	Score	4th place	Teams
2025; Details	(Brazil); Betim	Argentina	Round-robin	Peru	Brazil	Round-robin	Chile	5
2026; Details	(Peru); Lima	Brazil	3–0	Colombia	Argentina	3–0	Chile	8

== Medals summary ==
Rank	Nation	Gold	Silver	Bronze	Total
1	Argentina	1	0	1	2
1	Brazil	1	0	1	2
3	Colombia	0	1	0	1
3	Peru	0	1	0	1
Totals (4 entries)		2	2	2	6
