= 2023 Women's Pan-American Volleyball Cup =

Volleyball tournament

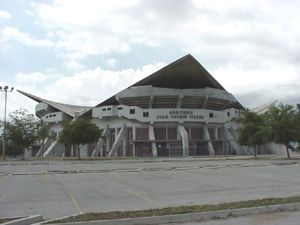
- Auditorio Juan Pachín Vicéns, host venue of the tournament

Tournament details
- Host country: Puerto Rico
- Dates: 6–13 August
- Teams: 10
- Venue: 1 (in 1 host city)

Final positions
- Champions: Argentina (1st title)
- Runners-up: Puerto Rico
- Third place: United States
- Fourth place: Dominican Republic

Tournament awards
- MVP: (Argentina) Bianca Cugno

Tournament statistics
- Matches played: 33
- Attendance: 31,458 (953 per match)

The 2023 Women's Pan-American Volleyball Cup was the 20th edition of the annual women's volleyball tournament. It was held at the Auditorio Juan Pachín Vicéns in Ponce, Puerto Rico from 6–13 August 2023.

The competition gave two spots to the women's volleyball tournament of the 2023 Pan American Games, in Santiago, Chile.

Argentina won their first gold medal while Puerto Rico finished as runners-up for the third time in its history. The United States defeated the Dominican Republic to claim the bronze medal. Bianca Cugno of Argentina was the most valuable player.

== Pool composition ==
| Pool A | Pool B |
|---|---|
| Canada; Colombia; Costa Rica; Peru; United States | Argentina; Chile; Dominican Republic; Mexico; Puerto Rico |

== Preliminary rounds ==
=== Pool A ===
| Pos | Team | Pld | W | L | Pts | SPW | SPL | SPR | SW | SL | SR | Qualification |
|---|---|---|---|---|---|---|---|---|---|---|---|---|
| 1 | United States | 4 | 4 | 0 | 20 | 300 | 206 | 1.456 | 12 | 0 | MAX | Semifinals |
| 2 | Colombia | 4 | 3 | 1 | 12 | 332 | 290 | 1.145 | 9 | 6 | 1.500 | Quarterfinals |
| 3 | Canada | 4 | 2 | 2 | 9 | 314 | 317 | 0.991 | 7 | 8 | 0.875 | Quarterfinals |
| 4 | Peru | 4 | 1 | 3 | 9 | 327 | 331 | 0.988 | 7 | 9 | 0.778 | Classification 7/10 |
| 5 | Costa Rica | 4 | 0 | 4 | 0 | 171 | 300 | 0.570 | 0 | 12 | 0.000 | Classification 7/10 |

Source: NORCECA

| Date | Time | | Score | | Set 1 | Set 2 | Set 3 | Set 4 | Set 5 | Total | Report |
|---|---|---|---|---|---|---|---|---|---|---|---|
| 6 Aug | 14:00 | United States | 3–0 | Costa Rica | 25–12 | 25–12 | 25–17 | | | 75–41 | Report |
| 6 Aug | 18:00 | Colombia | 3–1 | Canada | 25–19 | 25–20 | 24–26 | 25–19 | | 99–84 | Report |
| 7 Aug | 14:00 | Canada | 3–0 | Costa Rica | 25–12 | 25–17 | 25–15 | | | 75–44 | Report |
| 7 Aug | 16:00 | United States | 3–0 | Peru | 25–23 | 25–20 | 25–13 | | | 75–56 | Report |
| 8 Aug | 14:00 | Peru | 3–0 | Costa Rica | 25–15 | 25–19 | 25–18 | | | 75–52 | Report |
| 8 Aug | 16:00 | Colombia | 0–3 | United States | 14–25 | 21–25 | 19–25 | | | 54–75 | Report |
| 9 Aug | 14:00 | Colombia | 3–0 | Costa Rica | 25–13 | 25–12 | 25–9 | | | 75–34 | Report |
| 9 Aug | 16:00 | Canada | 3–2 | Peru | 25–22 | 25–21 | 22–25 | 13–25 | 15–6 | 100–99 | Report |
| 10 Aug | 14:00 | Colombia | 3–2 | Peru | 18–25 | 21–25 | 25–20 | 25–17 | 15–10 | 104–97 | Report |
| 10 Aug | 18:00 | Canada | 0–3 | United States | 17–25 | 20–25 | 18–25 | | | 55–75 | Report |

=== Pool B ===
| Pos | Team | Pld | W | L | Pts | SPW | SPL | SPR | SW | SL | SR | Qualification |
|---|---|---|---|---|---|---|---|---|---|---|---|---|
| 1 | Dominican Republic | 4 | 4 | 0 | 17 | 353 | 286 | 1.234 | 12 | 3 | 4.000 | Semifinals |
| 2 | Argentina | 4 | 2 | 2 | 13 | 325 | 314 | 1.035 | 9 | 6 | 1.500 | Quarterfinals |
| 3 | Puerto Rico | 4 | 2 | 2 | 11 | 370 | 359 | 1.031 | 9 | 8 | 1.125 | Quarterfinals |
| 4 | Mexico | 4 | 2 | 2 | 8 | 303 | 315 | 0.962 | 6 | 8 | 0.750 | Classification 7/10 |
| 5 | Chile | 4 | 0 | 4 | 1 | 246 | 323 | 0.762 | 1 | 12 | 0.083 | Classification 7/10 |

Source: NORCECA

| Date | Time | | Score | | Set 1 | Set 2 | Set 3 | Set 4 | Set 5 | Total | Report |
|---|---|---|---|---|---|---|---|---|---|---|---|
| 6 Aug | 16:00 | Mexico | 0–3 | Argentina | 20–25 | 19–25 | 18–25 | | | 57–75 | Report |
| 6 Aug | 20:00 | Puerto Rico | 3–0 | Chile | 25–22 | 25–17 | 25–23 | | | 75–62 | Report |
| 7 Aug | 18:00 | Chile | 0–3 | Dominican Republic | 23–25 | 15–25 | 15–25 | | | 53–75 | Report |
| 7 Aug | 20:00 | Puerto Rico | 3–2 | Argentina | 20–25 | 25–18 | 25–18 | 23–25 | 15–7 | 108–93 | Report |
| 8 Aug | 18:00 | Puerto Rico | 1–3 | Mexico | 25–22 | 21–25 | 22–25 | 19–25 | | 87–97 | Report |
| 8 Aug | 20:00 | Dominican Republic | 3–1 | Argentina | 25–23 | 25–18 | 21–25 | 25–16 | | 96–82 | Report |
| 9 Aug | 18:00 | Argentina | 3–0 | Chile | 25–16 | 25–19 | 25–18 | | | 75–53 | Report |
| 9 Aug | 20:00 | Mexico | 0–3 | Dominican Republic | 13–25 | 21–25 | 17–25 | | | 51–75 | Report |
| 10 Aug | 16:00 | Mexico | 3–1 | Chile | 25–15 | 23–25 | 25–20 | 25–18 | | 98–78 | Report |
| 10 Aug | 20:00 | Puerto Rico | 2–3 | Dominican Republic | 23–25 | 13–25 | 25–18 | 25–23 | 14–16 | 100–107 | Report |

== Final rounds ==
=== Championship bracket ===
Quarterfinals
B2 | Argentina | 3
A3 | Canada | 1
A2 | Colombia | 2
B3 | Puerto Rico | 3

Semifinals
A1 | United States | 1
B2 | Argentina | 3
B1 | Dominican Republic | 2
B3 | Puerto Rico | 3

Final
B2 | Argentina | 3
B3 | Puerto Rico | 2
3rd place
A1 | United States | 3
B1 | Dominican Republic | 1

=== Classification 7/10 ===
| Date | Time | | Score | | Set 1 | Set 2 | Set 3 | Set 4 | Set 5 | Total | Report |
|---|---|---|---|---|---|---|---|---|---|---|---|
| 11 Aug | 14:00 | Mexico | 3–0 | Costa Rica | 25–22 | 25–19 | 25–11 | | | 75–52 | Report |
| 11 Aug | 16:00 | Peru | 3–1 | Chile | 25–20 | 16–25 | 25–22 | 25–16 | | 91–83 | Report |

=== Quarterfinals ===
| Date | Time | | Score | | Set 1 | Set 2 | Set 3 | Set 4 | Set 5 | Total | Report |
|---|---|---|---|---|---|---|---|---|---|---|---|
| 11 Aug | 18:00 | Argentina | 3–1 | Canada | 25–21 | 25–20 | 23–25 | 25–12 | | 98–78 | Report |
| 11 Aug | 20:00 | Colombia | 2–3 | Puerto Rico | 20–25 | 25–17 | 25–20 | 20–25 | 11–15 | 101–102 | Report |

=== Final classification 9/10 ===
| Date | Time | | Score | | Set 1 | Set 2 | Set 3 | Set 4 | Set 5 | Total | Report |
|---|---|---|---|---|---|---|---|---|---|---|---|
| 12 Aug | 12:00 | Costa Rica | 0–3 | Chile | 20–25 | 9–25 | 18–25 | | | 47–75 | Report |

=== Classification 5/8 ===
| Date | Time | | Score | | Set 1 | Set 2 | Set 3 | Set 4 | Set 5 | Total | Report |
|---|---|---|---|---|---|---|---|---|---|---|---|
| 12 Aug | 14:00 | Mexico | 0–3 | Colombia | 17–25 | 16–25 | 22–25 | | | 55–75 | Report |
| 12 Aug | 16:00 | Peru | 3–0 | Canada | 25–20 | 25–22 | 25–21 | | | 75–63 | Report |

=== Semifinals ===
| Date | Time | | Score | | Set 1 | Set 2 | Set 3 | Set 4 | Set 5 | Total | Report |
|---|---|---|---|---|---|---|---|---|---|---|---|
| 12 Aug | 18:00 | United States | 1–3 | Argentina | 26–24 | 23–25 | 20–25 | 25–27 | | 94–101 | Report |
| 12 Aug | 20:00 | Dominican Republic | 2–3 | Puerto Rico | 18–25 | 25–21 | 25–20 | 22–25 | 7–15 | 97–106 | Report |

=== Final classification 7/8 ===
| Date | Time | | Score | | Set 1 | Set 2 | Set 3 | Set 4 | Set 5 | Total | Report |
|---|---|---|---|---|---|---|---|---|---|---|---|
| 13 Aug | 12:00 | Mexico | 3–1 | Canada | 25–13 | 21–25 | 25–20 | 25–23 | | 96–81 | Report |

=== Final classification 5/6 ===
| Date | Time | | Score | | Set 1 | Set 2 | Set 3 | Set 4 | Set 5 | Total | Report |
|---|---|---|---|---|---|---|---|---|---|---|---|
| 13 Aug | 14:00 | Colombia | 3–2 | Peru | 22–25 | 25–23 | 19–25 | 25–23 | 15–7 | 106–103 | Report |

=== 3rd place match ===
| Date | Time | | Score | | Set 1 | Set 2 | Set 3 | Set 4 | Set 5 | Total | Report |
|---|---|---|---|---|---|---|---|---|---|---|---|
| 13 Aug | 16:00 | United States | 3–1 | Dominican Republic | 25–22 | 25–20 | 21–25 | 27–25 | | 98–92 | Report |

=== Final ===
| Date | Time | | Score | | Set 1 | Set 2 | Set 3 | Set 4 | Set 5 | Total | Report |
|---|---|---|---|---|---|---|---|---|---|---|---|
| 13 Aug | 18:00 | Argentina | 3–2 | Puerto Rico | 25–17 | 25–22 | 23–25 | 19–25 | 15–6 | 107–95 | Report |

== Final standing ==
| Rank | Team |
|---|---|
| 1st place, gold medalist(s) | Argentina |
| 2nd place, silver medalist(s) | Puerto Rico |
| 3rd place, bronze medalist(s) | United States |
| 4 | Dominican Republic |
| 5 | Colombia |
| 6 | Peru |
| 7 | Mexico |
| 8 | Canada |
| 9 | Chile |
| 10 | Costa Rica |

2023 Women's Pan-American Cup champions

Argentina
1st title

14-woman roster
Tatiana Vera, Yamila Nizetich, Eugenia Nosach, Candela Sol Salinas, Erika Mercado, Bianca Cugno, Daniela Bulaich,
Tatiana Rizzo, Bianca Farriol, Victoria Mayer, Antonela Fortuna, Candelaria Herrera, Brenda Graff and Agostina Pelozo
Head coach
Daniel Castellani

== Individual awards ==
- Most valuable player
  Bianca Cugno (ARG)
- Best setter
  Ivonne Martínez (MEX)
- Best outside hitters
  Simone Lee (USA)
  Ana Karina Olaya (COL)
- Best middle blockers
  Geraldine González (DOM)
  Jocelyn Urías (MEX)
- Best opposite
  Bianca Cugno (ARG)
- Best scorer
  Bianca Cugno (ARG)
- Best server
  Bianca Cugno (ARG)
- Best libero
  Joseline Landeros (MEX)
- Best digger
  Joseline Landeros (MEX)
- Best receiver
  Ysabella Sánchez (PER)

== See also ==
- 2023 Men's Pan-American Volleyball Cup
