= Paola Ampudia =

Colombian volleyball player (born 1988)

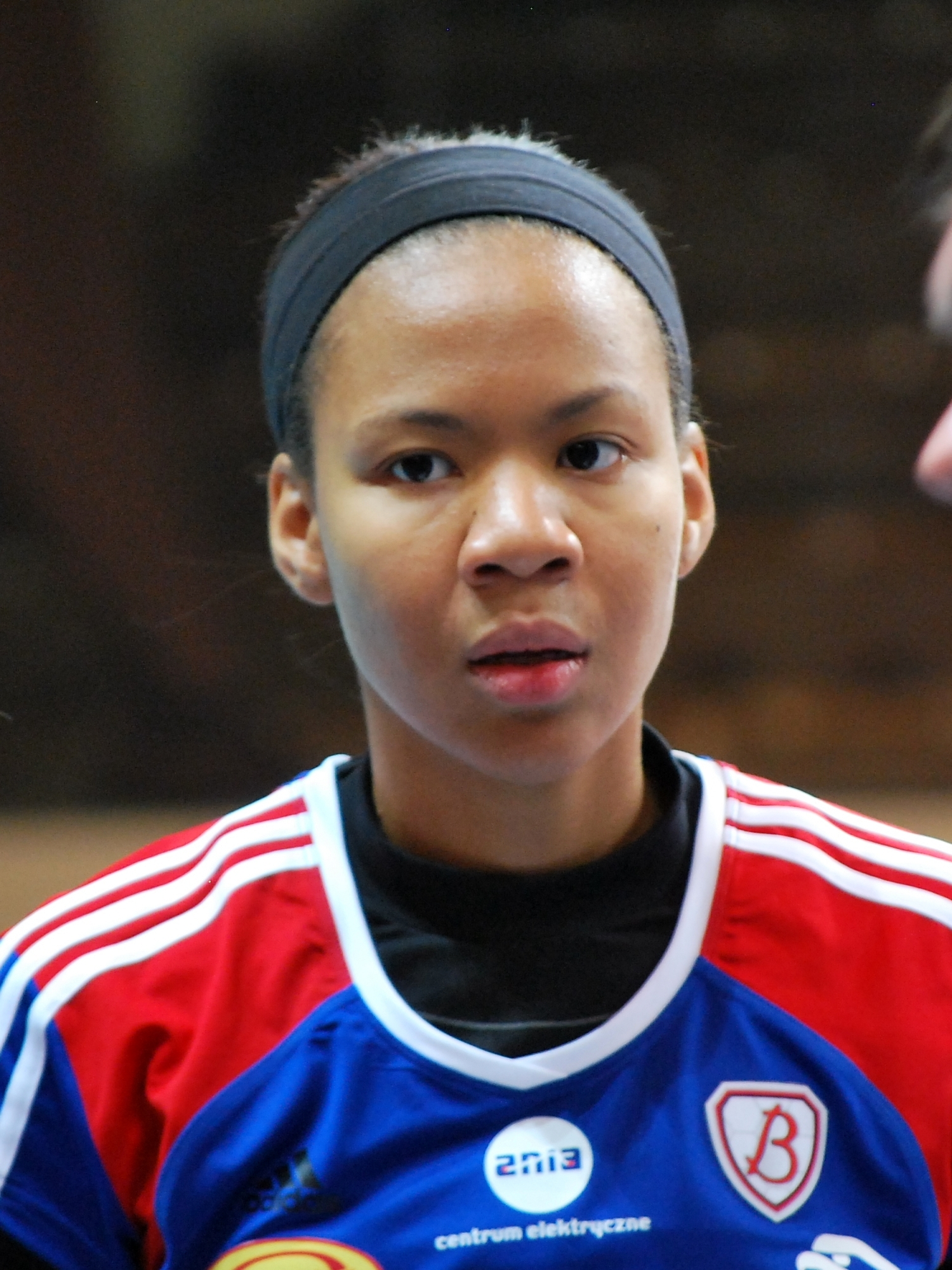

Personal information
- Nationality: Colombian
- Born: 5 August 1988 (age 38)
- Height: 185 cm (6 ft 1 in)
- Weight: 72 kg (159 lb)
- Spike: 308 cm (121 in)
- Block: 303 cm (119 in)
- Education: University of Missouri

Career
Teams
	Liga Vallecaucana

National team
2015	Colombia

Paola Ampudia (born 5 August 1988) is a Colombian volleyball player. She is part of the Colombia women's national volleyball team. On club level she played for Liga Vallecaucana in 2015.

She played for the University of Missouri.

== Clubs ==
Club	Country	Season
University of Missouri	United States	2007–2010
Leonas de Ponce	Puerto Rico	2011-2011
Robursport Volley Pesaro	Italy	2011–2012
İqtisadçı VK	Azerbaijan	2012-2012
Budowlani Łódź	Poland	2012–2013
Jakarta Elektrik PLN	Indonesia	2013–2014
Club Tupac Amaru	Peru	2014–2015
