= Bianca Farriol =

Argentine volleyball player (born 2001)

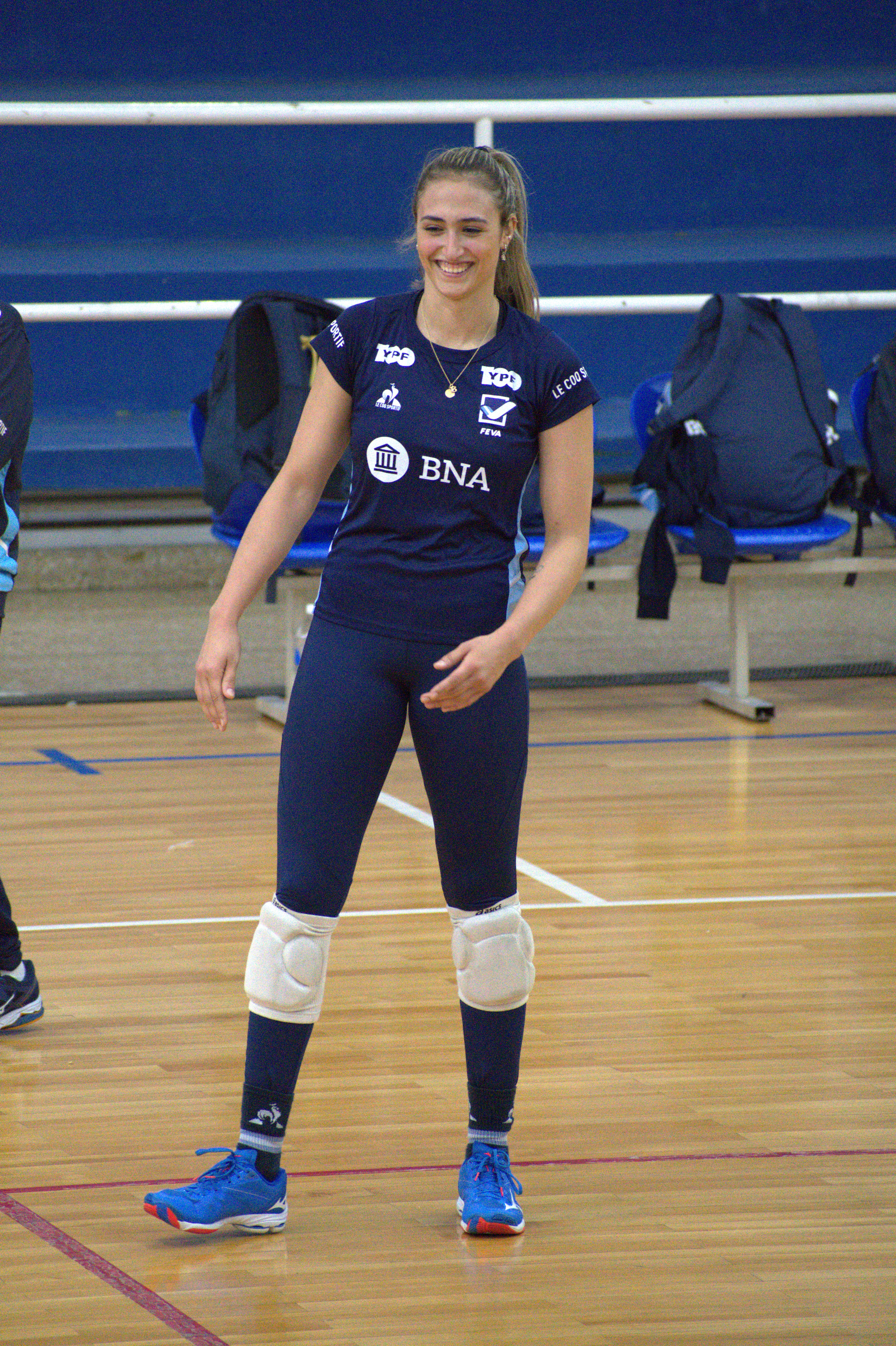
- Farriol in 2022

Personal information
- Nationality: Argentine
- Born: 18 December 2001 (age 24) Buenos Aires
- Education: Universidad La Matanza
- Height: 187 cm (6 ft 2 in)
- Weight: 75 kg (165 lb)
- Spike: 305 cm (120 in)
- Block: 290 cm (114 in)

Volleyball information
- Position: Middle blocker
- Current club: (Italy) HR Volley Macerata
- Number: 11 (club and national team)

Career
- Years: Team
- 2018–2020 2020–2023 2023–2025 2025–: (Argentina) San Lorenzo de Almagro (France) Béziers Volley (Greece) Olympiacos Piraeus (Italy) HR Volley Macerata

National team
- Years: Team
- 2018–: Argentina
Honours
Junior South American Championship
Silver medal – second place	2018 Lima	Team
Pan-American Cup
Gold medal – first place	2023 Ponce	Team
Gold medal – first place	2024 León/Irapuato	Team
South American Championship
Bronze medal – third place	2021 Barrancabermeja	Team
Silver medal – second place	2023 Recife	Team
- Updated on 18 April 2025

Bianca Farriol (born 18 December 2001) is an Argentine volleyball player. She is part of the Argentina women's national volleyball team. She competed at the 2020 Summer Olympics. At club level, she plays in Italian Volley League for HR Volley Macerata.

== Career ==
She participated in the 2018 FIVB Volleyball Women's Nations League.

== Sporting achievements ==
=== National team ===
- 2018 Junior South American Championship
- 2021 South American Championship
- 2023 Pan-American Volleyball Cup
- 2023 South American Championship
- 2024 Pan-American Volleyball Cup

=== Clubs ===
==== International competitions ====
- 2019 South American Club Championship, with San Lorenzo de Almagro
- 2020 South American Club Championship, with San Lorenzo de Almagro

==== National championships ====
- 2018–2019 Argentinian League, with San Lorenzo de Almagro
- 2020–2021 French League, with Béziers Volley
- 2023–2024 Hellenic Championship, with Olympiacos Piraeus
- 2024–2025 Hellenic Championship, with Olympiacos Piraeus

==== National trophies ====
- 2021 French Super Cup, with Béziers Volley
- 2022–2023 French Cup, with Béziers Volley
- 2023–2024 Hellenic Cup, with Olympiacos Piraeus
- 2024 Hellenic Super Cup, with Olympiacos Piraeus
- 2024–2025 Hellenic Cup, with Olympiacos Piraeus

=== Individuals ===
- 2018 Junior South American Championship: Best Middle blocker
- 2019 South American Club Championship: Dream team (Middle blocker)
- 2022-23 French Championship: Best blocker (97 block points)
- 2024 Hellenic Cup: Best blocker (16/12 winning blocks/sets)
- 2023-24 Hellenic championship: Best blocker (60/58 winning blocks/sets)
- 2024 Pan-American Volleyball Cup: MVP – Best blocker
- 2025 Hellenic Cup: Best blocker (10 block points)
