= Cindy Ramírez =

Colombian volleyball player (born 1989)

Cindy María Ramírez

Personal information
- Nationality: Colombian
- Born: 6 May 1989 (age 37)
- Height: 195 cm (6 ft 5 in)
- Weight: 82 kg (181 lb)
- Spike: 315 cm (124 in)
- Block: 323 cm (127 in)

Volleyball information
- Position: Middle blocker

Career
| Years | Teams |
|---|---|
| 2015 | Liga Vallecaucana |

National team
| 2005- | Colombia |

Cindy María Ramírez (born 6 May 1989) is a Colombian volleyball player. She is part of the Colombia women's national volleyball team. She competed among others at the 2005 Bolivarian Games, 2013 Bolivarian Games and in the 2015 FIVB World Grand Prix. On club level she played for Liga Vallecaucana in 2015.
