= Copa Sudamericana (men's volleyball) =

- Most recent season or competition: 2026 Copa Sudamericana (men's volleyball)
- Sport: Volleyball
- Founded: 2024; 2 years ago
- First season: 2025
- No. of teams: 5
- Continent: South America (CSV)
- Most recent champion: Argentina (1st title)
- Most titles: Argentina; Brazil (1 title each)

The Men's Volleyball Copa Sudamericana is an annual international volleyball competition organized by the Confederación Sudamericana de Voleibol (CSV) for senior men's national volleyball teams of South America. It is the second-tier competition of national volleyball teams in South America, ranking below the Men's South American Volleyball Championship.

The creation of the Copa Sudamericana, formerly known as Copa América, was announced on 13 July 2024 by President Marco Tullio Teixeira during the 76th Ordinary Congress of the CSV in Belo Horizonte, Brazil. The tournament woud feature some invited teams from the North, Central America and Caribbean Volleyball Confederation (NORCECA) and would be played during the dates of the FIVB Men's Volleyball Nations League, in order to give competition opportunities to the teams that do not participate in this world competition.

The tournament is considered a re-edition of the Volleyball America's Cup, an extinct continental competition played from 1998 to 2008 between national men's teams of the CSV and NORCECA.

Starting with its second edition in 2026, the tournament adopted its current name, the Copa Sudamericana, replacing the name Copa América that was used in the inaugural edition in 2025.

== Results summary ==
Year	Host	Final			3rd place match			Teams
Year	Host	Champions	Score	Runners-up	3rd place	Score	4th place	Teams
2025; Details	(Brazil); Betim	Brazil	Round-robin	Argentina	Venezuela	Round-robin	Chile	5
2026; Details	(Bolivia); Cochabamba	Argentina	3–2	Brazil	Colombia	3–0	Chile	8

== Medals summary ==
Rank	Nation	Gold	Silver	Bronze	Total
1	Argentina	1	1	0	2
1	Brazil	1	1	0	2
3	Colombia	0	0	1	1
3	Venezuela	0	0	1	1
Totals (4 entries)		2	2	2	6
