= Women's Pan-American Volleyball Cup =

Women's volleyball tournament organized by NORCECA

- Current season, competition or edition: 2026 Women's Pan-American Volleyball Cup
- Sport: Volleyball
- Founded: 2002; 24 years ago
- First season: 2002
- Continents: NORCECA
- Most recent champions: United States (8th title)
- Most titles: United States (8 titles)

The Women's Pan-American Volleyball Cup is a continental cup organized by NORCECA with teams from all over America (North-, South- and Central America, and the Caribbean), that served as a qualifier for the World Grand Prix. The tournament also granted places for the Final Four Women's Volleyball Cup. Since 2018 the event also serves as Pan American Games classification. The men have their own equivalent of the tournament, the Men's Pan-American Cup.

== Results ==
Pan-American Cup
Year	Host	Champion	Runner-up	3rd place	4th place
2002; Details	Tijuana, Mexico	Cuba	Dominican Republic	Canada	Mexico
2003; Details	Saltillo, Mexico	United States	Dominican Republic	Cuba	Brazil
2004; Details	Tijuana and Mexicali, Mexico	Cuba	United States	Dominican Republic	Brazil
2005; Details	Santo Domingo, Dominican Republic	Cuba	Dominican Republic	Brazil	United States
2006; Details	San Juan, Puerto Rico	Brazil	Cuba	Dominican Republic	United States
2007; Details	Colima, Mexico	Cuba	Brazil	Dominican Republic	United States
2008; Details	Tijuana and Mexicali, Mexico	Dominican Republic	Brazil	Argentina	Puerto Rico
2009; Details	Miami, United States	Brazil	Dominican Republic	Puerto Rico	United States
2010; Details	Rosarito and Tijuana, Mexico	Dominican Republic	Peru	United States	Cuba
2011; Details	Ciudad Juárez, Mexico	Brazil	Dominican Republic	United States	Cuba
2012; Details	Ciudad Juárez, Mexico	United States	Brazil	Cuba	Dominican Republic
2013; Details	Lima, Peru	United States	Dominican Republic	Argentina	Brazil
2014; Details	Ciudad de México and Pachuca, Mexico	Dominican Republic	United States	Puerto Rico	Argentina
2015; Details	Lima and Callao, Peru	United States	Dominican Republic	Argentina	Cuba
2016; Details	Santo Domingo, Dominican Republic	Dominican Republic	Puerto Rico	United States	Cuba
2017; Details	Lima and Cañete, Peru	United States	Dominican Republic	Puerto Rico	Peru
2018; Details	Santo Domingo, Dominican Republic	United States	Dominican Republic	Canada	Brazil
2019; Details	Trujillo and Chiclayo, Peru	United States	Dominican Republic	Colombia	Puerto Rico
2020	Cancelled due to COVID-19 pandemic				
2021; Exceptional edition	Santo Domingo, Dominican Republic	Dominican Republic	Mexico	United States	Canada
2022; Details	Hermosillo, Mexico	Dominican Republic	Colombia	United States	Mexico
2023; Details	Ponce, Puerto Rico	Argentina	Puerto Rico	United States	Dominican Republic
2024; Details	León and Irapuato, Mexico	Argentina	United States	Colombia	Dominican Republic
2025; Details	Colima, Mexico	Dominican Republic	Colombia	Puerto Rico	Mexico
2026; Details	León, Mexico	United States	Dominican Republic	Mexico	Puerto Rico

== Medal table ==
Rank	Nation	Gold	Silver	Bronze	Total
1	United States	8	3	5	16
2	Dominican Republic	6	11	3	20
3	Cuba	4	1	2	7
4	Brazil	3	3	1	7
5	Argentina	2	0	3	5
6	Puerto Rico	0	2	4	6
7	Colombia	0	2	2	4
8	Peru	0	1	0	1
9	Canada	0	0	2	2
10	Mexico	0	0	1	1
Totals (10 entries)		23	23	23	69

== Participating nations ==
Nation	(Mexico) 2002	(Mexico) 2003	(Mexico) 2004	(Dominican Republic) 2005	(Puerto Rico) 2006	(Mexico) 2007	(Mexico) 2008	(United States) 2009	(Mexico) 2010	(Mexico) 2011	(Mexico) 2012	(Peru) 2013	(Mexico) 2014	(Peru) 2015	(Dominican Republic) 2016	(Peru) 2017	(Dominican Republic) 2018	(Peru) 2019	(Dominican Republic) 2021*	(Mexico) 2022	(Puerto Rico) 2023	(Mexico) 2024	(Mexico) 2025	(Mexico) 2026	Years
Argentina	5th	–	8th	9th	10th	6th	3rd	6th	5th	6th	5th	3rd	4th	3rd	5th	8th	9th	5th	–	–	1st	1st	–	–	19
Barbados	–	–	–	10th	12th	–	–	–	–	–	–	–	–	–	–	–	–	–	–	–	–	–	–	–	2
Brazil	–	4th	4th	3rd	1st	2nd	2nd	1st	8th	1st	2nd	4th	–	7th	–	–	4th	–	–	–	–	–	–	–	13
Canada	3rd	6th	5th	6th	7th	9th	8th	7th	7th	7th	8th	7th	6th	5th	6th	6th	3rd	6th	4th	9th	8th	7th	8th	5th	24
Chile	–	–	–	–	–	–	–	–	–	12th	–	–	–	–	–	12th	–	–	–	–	9th	8th	–	–	4
Colombia	–	–	–	–	–	–	–	–	–	–	11th	9th	7th	8th	7th	7th	5th	3rd	–	2nd	5th	3rd	2nd	–	12
Costa Rica	–	–	9th	11th	11th	8th	9th	8th	11th	11th	9th	11th	10th	11th	12th	–	12th	–	–	8th	10th	11th	9th	8th	19
Cuba	1st	3rd	1st	1st	2nd	1st	11th	–	4th	4th	3rd	6th	5th	4th	4th	5th	7th	8th	5th	5th	–	9th	7th	6th	22
Dominican Republic	2nd	2nd	3rd	2nd	3rd	3rd	1st	2nd	1st	2nd	4th	2nd	1st	2nd	1st	2nd	2nd	2nd	1st	1st	4th	4th	1st	2nd	24
Guatemala	–	–	10th	–	–	–	–	11th	–	–	–	–	–	–	–	–	–	11th	–	–	–	–	–	10th	4
Jamaica	–	–	–	12th	–	–	–	–	–	–	–	–	–	–	–	–	–	–	–	–	–	–	–	–	1
Mexico	4th	8th	7th	7th	9th	10th	10th	9th	9th	9th	12th	12th	8th	10th	11th	11th	10th	9th	2nd	4th	7th	5th	4th	3rd	24
Nicaragua	–	–	–	–	–	–	–	–	–	–	–	–	–	–	–	–	–	–	–	10th	–	–	–	9th	2
Peru	–	–	–	–	6th	7th	7th	5th	2nd	8th	7th	8th	9th	9th	9th	4th	8th	7th	–	7th	6th	10th	6th	–	18
Puerto Rico	7th	7th	6th	5th	5th	5th	4th	3rd	6th	5th	6th	5th	3rd	6th	2nd	3rd	6th	4th	6th	6th	2nd	6th	3rd	4th	24
Suriname	–	–	–	–	–	–	–	–	–	–	–	–	–	–	–	–	–	–	–	–	–	12th	–	–	1
Trinidad and Tobago	–	–	–	–	–	12th	12th	10th	10th	10th	10th	10th	11th	–	10th	9th	11th	10th	–	–	–	–	10th	–	13
United States	6th	1st	2nd	4th	4th	4th	5th	4th	3rd	3rd	1st	1st	2nd	1st	3rd	1st	1st	1st	3rd	3rd	3rd	2nd	–	1st	23
Uruguay	–	–	–	–	–	11th	–	–	–	–	–	–	–	12th	–	–	–	–	–	–	–	–	–	–	2
Venezuela	–	5th	–	8th	8th	–	6th	–	–	–	–	–	–	–	8th	10th	–	–	–	–	–	–	5th	7th	8
Total	7	8	10	12	12	12	12	11	11	12	12	12	11	12	12	12	12	11	6	10	10	12	10	10	–

* = exceptional edition

== Most valuable player by edition ==
- 2002 – (Cuba) Yumilka Ruíz
- 2003 – (Dominican Republic) Milagros Cabral
- 2004 – (Cuba) Zoila Barros
- 2005 – (Dominican Republic) Yudelkys Bautista
- 2006 – (Brazil) Mari Steinbrecher
- 2007 – (Cuba) Nancy Carrillo
- 2008 – (Dominican Republic) Sidarka Núñez
- 2009 – (Dominican Republic) Bethania de la Cruz
- 2010 – (Dominican Republic) Prisilla Rivera
- 2011 – (Brazil) Sheilla Castro
- 2012 – (United States) Kristin Richards
- 2013 – (United States) Nicole Fawcett
- 2014 – (Dominican Republic) Brenda Castillo
- 2015 – (United States) Krista Vansant
- 2016 – (Dominican Republic) Brayelin Martinez
- 2017 – (United States) Micha Hancock
- 2018 – (United States) Lauren Carlini
- 2019 – (United States) Micha Hancock
- 2021 – (Dominican Republic) Prisilla Rivera
- 2022 – (Dominican Republic) Niverka Marte
- 2023 – (Argentina) Bianca Cugno
- 2024 – (Argentina) Bianca Farriol
- 2025 – (Dominican Republic) Gaila González
- 2026 – (United States) Jess Mruzik

== See also ==
- Women's Junior Pan-American Volleyball Cup
- Girls' Youth Pan-American Volleyball Cup
