= Ecuador women's national volleyball team =

National sports team

Ecuador
- Association: Federación Ecuatoriana de Voleibol
- Confederation: CSV
- FIVB ranking: 102 (2 October 2026)

Uniforms
Home

Summer Olympics
- Appearances: 0
- www.voleibolecuador.org

The Ecuador women's national volleyball team represents Ecuador in international competitions in women's volleyball. The dominant forces in women's volleyball on the South American continent are Brazil and Peru.

== Results ==
=== South American Championships ===
- 1977 — 8th place

=== Bolivarian Games ===
- 2005 — 4th place

== Roster ==
2005 (Bolivarian Games)

- Head Coach:

#	Name	Date of Birth	Height	Weight	Spike	Block
1	Kerly Avecillas	14.07.1984	176	80
2	Diana Bruzzone	18.05.1986	166	61
3	Pamela Castillo	02.02.1987	176	70
4	Victoria Davila	22.06.1983	174	76
5	Stephany Donoso	15.11.1984	150	53
6	Mercedes Gómez	24.09.1987	178	72
9	Malena Izquierdo	06.04.1986	164	66
11	Tania Manangon	18.12.1987	179	64
12	Estefania Mata	28.04.1987	179	70
13	Betsy Melendes	11.02.1987	151	54
14	Carla Ortíz (c)	05.08.1982	160	53
17	Carla Sereni	24.02.1987	176	67
