= Bolivia women's national volleyball team =

National sports team

Bolivia
- Association: Bolivia Volleyball Federation
- Confederation: CSV
- FIVB ranking: NR (29 June 2025)

Uniforms
Home

The Bolivia women's national volleyball team represents Bolivia in international women's volleyball competitions and friendly matches.

It finished 6th at the 2005 Women's South American Volleyball Championship.
