= Bianca Cugno =

Argentine volleyball player (born 2003)

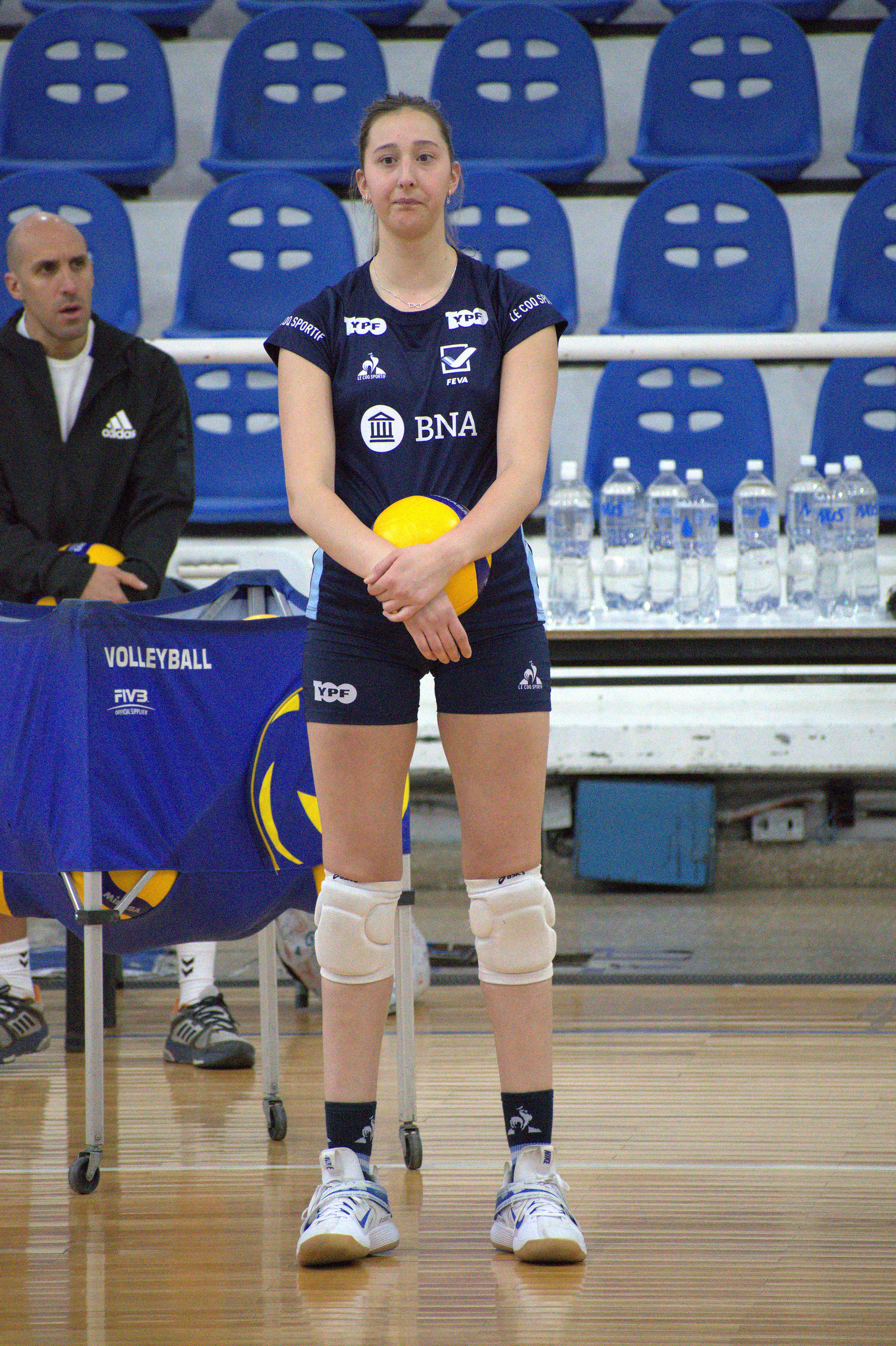

Personal information
- Born: 22 April 2003 (age 23); Devoto, Córdoba, Argentina
- Height: 1.94 m (6 ft 4 in)
- Weight: 72 kg (159 lb)

Volleyball information
- Position: Opposite
- Number: 9

Career
Years	Teams
2017-2018	Selección Argentina Juvenil
2018-2019	Universitario Córdoba
2019-2020	Estudiantes de La Plata
2020-2021	Boca Juniors
2021-2023	Béziers Volley
2023-2025	Levallois Paris Saint-Cloud
2025-2026	Osasco Voleibol Clube
2026-

Bianca Cugno (born 22 April 2003, Devoto, Córdoba, Argentina) is an Argentine volleyball player who plays as an opposite for the Brazilian club Osasco Voleibol Clube and for the Argentina women's national volleyball team.

== History ==
After training in the Sociedad Sportiva de Devoto Cugno jumped to the Club Universitario de Córdoba, then ended up in Estudiantes de La Plata and Boca Juniors to finally emigrate to French volleyball at the age of 18. With Béziers Volley she achieved the title of the French Cup in 2023, to be transferred to Levallois Paris Saint-Cloud, also in the French first division, in mid-2023. With this team, she was crowned league champion in the 2023/24 season after defeating Nantes Neptunes, and was recognized as the most valuable player in the first of two finals. In the same season they managed to reach the semi-finals of the CEV Cup (second most important in Europe), being eliminated by the Italian Chieri '76, later champion of the competition. The following season she and her team played in the Champions League, where they were eliminated in the first round. At the end of the 24/25 season, the Brazilian club Osasco announced his signing.

At the national team level, she participated in two youth world championships before making it to the senior team, with which he played the 2022 FIVB Women's Volleyball World Championship She was named by the FIVB as "a player to watch" and "one of Argentina's most promising talents" during the under-20 world cup of 2021. In 2023, she was crowned champion of the Pan American Cup with the Argentine national team, after scoring 16 points in the final (14 attacks, 1 block, 1 serve). In the tournament, she also won the individual awards for best scorer, best server, best opposite player, and most valuable player of the tournament. The following year, they won the competition twice after defeating the United States in the final. In July 2025, she was crowned Copa América champion, also winning the awards for best opposite number and most valuable player of the tournament.

== Career ==
- Sociedad Sportiva de Devoto
- Club Universitario de Córdoba (Argentina) (2018–19)
- Estudiantes de La Plata (Argentina) (2019–20)
- Boca Juniors (Argentina) (2020–21)
- Béziers Volley (France) (2021–23)
- Levallois Paris Saint-Cloud (France) (2023–25)
- Osasco Voleibol Clube (Brazil) (2025-)

== International career ==
=== Youth tournaments ===
Competition	Host	Position
2017 South American Women's Under-16 Volleyball Championship	Paraguay	1º
2018 Girls' Youth South American Volleyball Championship	Colombia	1º
2019 FIVB Volleyball Girls' U18 World Championship	Egypt	12°
2019 FIVB Volleyball Women's U20 World Championship	Mexico	11°
2021 FIVB Volleyball Women's U20 World Championship	Netherlands	11°

=== Major tournaments ===
Competition	Host	Position
2021 Women's South American Volleyball Championship	Colombia	3º
2022 FIVB Women's Volleyball World Championship	Slovenia/Poland	16°
2023 Women's Pan-American Volleyball Cup	Puerto Rico	1º
2025 Copa América	Brazil	1º

== Individual distinctions ==
- Best player (MVP) and best opposite – 2018 Girls' Youth South American Volleyball Championship
- Best player (MVP) – 2017 South American Women's Under-16 Volleyball Championship
- Best scorer, best server, best opposite and most valuable player – 2023 Women's Pan-American Volleyball Cup
- Best player (MVP) and best opposite – 2025 Copa América
