= Colombia women's national volleyball team =

National sports team

Colombia
- Association: Federación Colombiana de Voleibol
- Confederation: CSV
- Head coach: (Brazil) Guilherme Schmitz
- FIVB ranking: 23 ▼1 (2 October 2026)

Uniforms
Home	Away

World Championship
- Appearances: 2 (First in 2022)
- Best result: 21st place (2022)
- www.fedevolei.com (in Spanish)
Honours
Event	1st	2nd	3rd
Challenger Cup	0	1	1
Pan-American Cup	0	2	2
Pan American Games	0	1	0
CAC Games	0	2	0
South American Championship	0	3	4
Copa Sudamericana	0	1	0
Total	0	10	7
Challenger Cup
Silver medal – second place	2018 Lima	
Bronze medal – third place	2023 Laval	
Pan-American Cup
Silver medal – second place	2022 Hermosillo	
Silver medal – second place	2025 Colima	
Bronze medal – third place	2019 Lima	
Bronze medal – third place	2024 León-Irapuato	
Pan American Games
Silver medal – second place	2019 Lima	Team
Central American and Caribbean Games
Silver medal – second place	2018 Barranquilla	Team
Silver medal – second place	2026 Santo Domingo	
South American Championship
Silver medal – second place	2017 Cali	
Silver medal – second place	2019 Cajamarca	
Silver medal – second place	2021 Barrancabermeja	
Bronze medal – third place	1991 São Paulo	
Bronze medal – third place	2015 Cartagena	
Bronze medal – third place	2023 Recife	
Bronze medal – third place	2026 Rio de Janeiro	
Copa Sudamericana
Silver medal – second place	2026 Lima	

The Colombia women's national volleyball team represents Colombia in international competitions in women's volleyball. The squad won its first continental medal at the 1991 edition of the South American Championship.

Boosted by the FIVB's Volleyball Empowerment program, the Colombian women's volleyball team has reached new heights in recent years.

== Results ==
=== World Championship ===
- 2022 — 21st place
- 2025 — 26th place
- 2027 — qualified

=== World Grand Prix ===
- 1993 to 2014 — did not participate
- 2015 — 23rd place
- 2016 — 24th place
- 2017 — 19th place

=== Challenger Cup ===
- 2018 — Silver medal
- 2019 — did not qualify
- 2022 — 4th place
- 2023 — Bronze medal
- 2024 — did not qualify

=== Pan American Games ===
- 1955 – did not participate
- 1959 – did not participate
- 1963 – did not participate
- 1967 – did not participate
- 1971 – 7th place
- 1975 – did not participate
- 1979 – did not participate
- 1983 – did not participate
- 1987 – did not participate
- 1991 – did not participate
- 1995 – did not participate
- 1999 – did not participate
- 2003 – did not participate
- 2007 – did not participate
- 2011 – did not participate
- 2015 – did not participate
- 2019 – Silver medal

=== Pan-American Cup ===
- 2002 to 2011 — did not participate
- 2012 — 11th place
- 2013 — 9th place
- 2014 — 7th place
- 2015 — 8th place
- 2016 — 7th place
- 2017 — 7th place
- 2018 — 5th place
- 2019 — 3rd place
- 2021 — did not participate
- 2022 — 2nd place

=== South American Championship ===
- 1951 — did not compete
- 1956 — did not compete
- 1958 — did not compete
- 1961 — did not compete
- 1962 — did not compete
- 1964 — did not compete
- 1967 — did not compete
- 1969 — 6th place
- 1971 — 7th place
- 1973 — 7th place
- 1975 — did not compete
- 1977 — did not compete
- 1979 — did not compete
- 1981 — did not compete
- 1983 — 5th place
- 1985 — 4th place
- 1987 — did not compete
- 1989 — did not compete
- 1991 — Bronze medal
- 1993 — 4th place
- 1995 — 5th place
- 1997 — 6th place
- 1999 — did not compete
- 2001 — did not compete
- 2003 — 4th place
- 2005 — did not compete
- 2007 — 6th place
- 2009 — 4th place
- 2011 — 4th place
- 2013 — 4th place
- 2015 — Bronze medal
- 2017 — Silver medal
- 2019 — Silver medal
- 2021 — Silver medal
- 2023 — Bronze medal
- 2026 — Bronze medal

=== Bolivarian Games ===
- 2005 — 3rd place

== Squads ==
#	Player	Birth Date	Height	2016/17 Club	Position
2.	Yeisy Soto	17/04/1996	186	(France) Angels Beziers	Middle Blocker
4.	Dayana Segovia	24/03/1996	182	(France) Angels Beziers	Opposite
5.	Angie Velasquez	13/06/2000	170	(Portugal) CD aves	Setter
6.	Lorena Zuleta	16/01/1981	192	(Kazakhstan) ZHETYSU Almaty Club	Middle Blocker
7.	Madelaynne Montaño	06/01/1983	186	(Poland) KPS Chemik Police	Outside Hitter
8.	Mery Mancilla	04/05/1984	186	(Colombia) Santiago de Cali	Setter
9.	Juliana Toro	29/01/1995	159	(Colombia) Liga Antioqueña	Libero
10.	Diana Arrechea	14/09/1994	176	(Switzerland) Zesar VFM	Outside Hitter
11.	Lybis Marmolejo	09/05/1992	181	(Colombia) Liga Antioqueña	Unknown
12.	Ivonne Montaño	12/11/1995	187	(Germany) SC Potsdam	Middle Blocker
13.	Camila Gómez	06/07/1995	158	(Brazil) Sesc RJ Flamengo	Libero
15.	María Marín (c)	04/11/1995	178	(Switzerland) Zesar VFM	Setter
16.	Melissa Rangel	16/10/1994	193	(Peru) Rebaza Acosta	Middle Blocker
17.	Daniela Castro	05/06/1993	184	(Colombia) Liga Bolivarense	Middle Blocker
19.	Maria Margarita Martinez	19/05/1995	178	(France) VCMB LM	Outside Hitter
20.	Amanda Coneo	20/12/1996	177	(France) Asptt Mulhouse	Outside hitter

- 2005 Bolivarian Games — Bronze Medal
  - Paola Ampudia, Sandra Montoya, Carolina Bahamon (c), Paula Cortés, Katerine Trejos, Mery Mancilla, Kenny Moreno, Diana Arango, Laura Cadavid, Silvia Lobo, Jessica Angulo and Cindy Ramírez
- 2011 South American Championship — 4th place
  - Madelaynne Montaño, Jessica Angulo, Cindy Ramírez, Martha Nieva, Lorena Zuleta, Paola Ampudia, Mery Mancilla, Danna Escobar, Kenny Moreno, Estanislada Cuéllar, Paola Cortés and Sandra Montoya.
