= Confederación Sudamericana de Voleibol =

Continental governing body for the sports of volleyball in South America

Confederación Sudamericana de Voleibol (CSV)
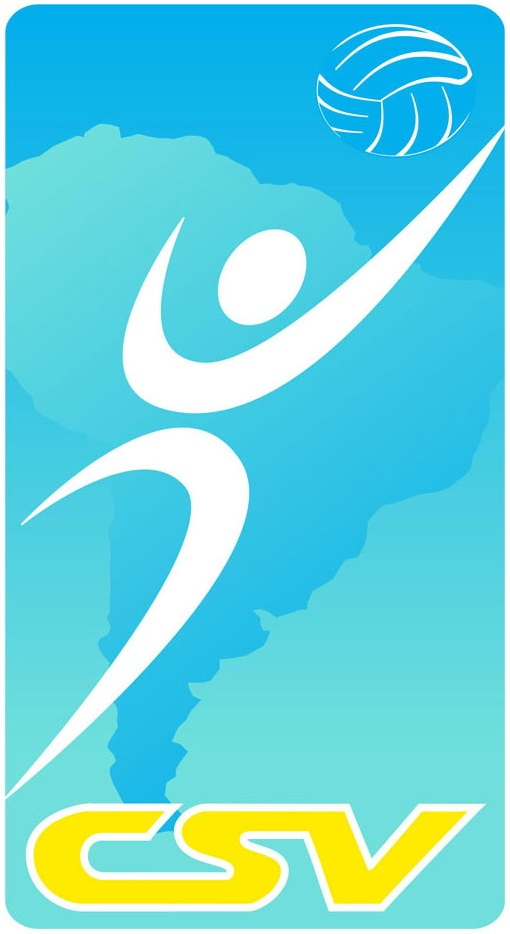
- Abbreviation: CSV
- Formation: 1946
- Type: Regional sports governing body
- Headquarters: Rio de Janeiro, Brazil
- Location: South America
- Members: 12 member associations
- Official language: Spanish and Portuguese
- President: (Colombia) Rafael Lloreda
- Parent organization: FIVB
- Website: VoleySur.org

The Confederación Sudamericana de Voleibol (CSV, Portuguese: Confederação Sul-americana de Voleibol, transl. South American Volleyball Confederation) is the sports governing body for volleyball in South America. Its headquarters are located in Rio de Janeiro, Brazil.

== Profile ==
The CSV's origins are still under dispute. Some argue it was founded in Buenos Aires, Argentina on February 12, 1946; some, that it was founded in Rio de Janeiro, Brazil on July 3 of the same year. Either way, it was formed even before the FIVB itself, and stands as the oldest of all volleyball continental confederations.

Up to now (2004), the CSV has had a total of eight presidents, all but one from national federations with some volleyball tradition at a certain point in history: Brazil, Peru, Argentina, Venezuela and Colombia, which is the exception. Following the election of the current president, Brazilian Mr. Ary Graça Filho, in 2003 the headquarters were relocated from Lima, Peru to Rio de Janeiro, Brazil.

The CSV presides over national volleyball federations located in South America and organizes continental competitions such as the South American Men's Volleyball Championship (first edition, 1951) and the Pan American Games, sometimes in conjunction with the FIVB and with other confederations, notably NORCECA with whom CSV co-organises the Pan-American tournaments. It also takes part in the organization of qualification tournaments for major events such as the Olympic Games or the men's and women's world championships, and of international competitions hosted by one of its affiliated federations.

== Teams ==
Lately, the only national South American federation with expressive results in international competitions is Brazil, which maintains intensive development programs for men's and women's volleyball.

Argentina has some tradition in men's volleyball, but it has shown unmistakable signs of decline: in recent years, Venezuela has been constantly threatening to take its long held position as the second volleyball force of the continent. However, Argentina is still one of the dominant forces in Men's volleyball.

With a silver medal at the Seoul Olympic Games, Peru had a very strong women's volleyball team in the 1980s. Its level of play has nevertheless dropped after the retirement of superstar players like Cecilia Tait, Natalia Málaga, Rosa García and Gabriela Pérez del Solar.

In recent years, the Junior and Youth categories in both boys and girls categories have started to shine in the CSV; as with their senior teams, Brazil in one of the world main forces in Junior and Youth categories but Argentina and Peru have started to shine in the Boys and Girls category respectively; after the I Youth Olympic Games where Argentinean boys got silver and Peruvian girls took bronze, Argentina claimed the top spot and Peru the third spot at the FIVB Senior World Rankings.

== Affiliated federations ==
As of 2022, the following 12 national federations were affiliated to the CSV:

Code	Federation	National teams	Founded	FIVB affiliation	CSV affiliation	IOC member
ARG	Argentina	Men's; U23; U21; U19; U17; Women's; U23; U21; U19; U17	2003	2003	2003	Yes
BOL	Bolivia	Men's; U23; U21; U19; U17; Women's; U23; U21; U19; U17				Yes
BRA	Brazil	Men's; U23; U21; U19; U17; Women's; U23; U21; U19; U17	1954			Yes
CHI	Chile	Men's; U23; U21; U19; U17; Women's; U23; U21; U19; U17				Yes
COL	Colombia	Men's; U23; U21; U19; U17; Women's; U23; U21; U19; U17				Yes
ECU	Ecuador	Men's; U23; U21; U19; U17; Women's; U23; U21; U19; U17				Yes
GUF	French Guiana	Men's; U23; U21; U19; U17; Women's; U23; U21; U19; U17				No
GUY	Guyana	Men's; U23; U21; U19; U17; Women's; U23; U21; U19; U17				Yes
PAR	Paraguay	Men's; U23; U21; U19; U17; Women's; U23; U21; U19; U17	1943			Yes
PER	Peru	Men's; U23; U21; U19; U17; Women's; U23; U21; U19; U17	1942			Yes
URU	Uruguay	Men's; U23; U21; U19; U17; Women's; U23; U21; U19; U17				Yes
VEN	Venezuela	Men's; U23; U21; U19; U17; Women's; U23; U21; U19; U17				Yes

== FIVB World Rankings ==
FIVB Men's Rankings (as of 1 October 2026)
CSV*	FIVB	+/-	National Team	Points
1	6	▲1	Brazil	333.79
2	14	Steady	Argentina	245.7
3	28	▲4	Chile	151.35
4	42	▲9	Colombia	120.97
5	56	▼8	Venezuela	87.09
6	105	▲15	Peru	30.89
*Local rankings based on FIVB ranking points

FIVB Women's Rankings (as of 2 October 2026)
CSV*	FIVB	+/-	National Team	Points
1	2	Steady	Brazil	420.13
2	20	▼3	Argentina	207.22
3	23	▼1	Colombia	175.63
4	45	▼7	Peru	101.43
5	63	▲23	Venezuela	62.96
6	65	▲1	Chile	62.31
*Local rankings based on FIVB ranking points

== Competitions ==
=== Organised entirely by CSV ===
==== Men ====
- Men's South American Volleyball Championship
- Men's Copa Sudamericana
- Men's South American Volleyball Club Championship
- U23 South American Volleyball Championship (U23)
- Junior South American Volleyball Championship (U21)
- Youth South American Volleyball Championship (U19)
- Child South American Volleyball Championship (U17)

==== Women ====
- Women's South American Volleyball Championship
- Women's Copa Sudamericana
- Women's South American Volleyball Club Championship
- U22 South American Volleyball Championship (U22)
- Junior South American Volleyball Championship (U21)
- Youth South American Volleyball Championship (U19)
- Child South American Volleyball Championship (U17)

=== Title holders ===
	Championship	Copa Sudamericana	U–20	U–18	U–16	Club Championship
Men	Brazil (2026)	Argentina (2026)	Brazil (2024)	Brazil (2026)	Brazil (2026)	(Brazil) Vôlei Renata (2026)
Women	Brazil (2026)	Brazil (2026)	Brazil (2024)	Brazil (2024)	Venezuela (2025)	(Brazil) SESI Bauru (2026)

=== Organised alongside NORCECA ===
==== Men ====
- Men's Pan-American Volleyball Cup
- U23 Pan-American Volleyball Cup (U23)
- Junior Pan-American Volleyball Cup (U21)
- Youth Pan-American Volleyball Cup (U19)

==== Women ====
- Women's Pan-American Volleyball Cup
- U23 Pan-American Volleyball Cup (U23)
- Junior Pan-American Volleyball Cup (U20)
- Youth Pan-American Volleyball Cup (U18)

==== Current champions ====
	Senior Pan-American Cup (M / W)	U23 Pan-American Cup (M / W)	Junior Pan-American Cup (M / W)	Youth Pan-American Cup (M / W)
Men	United States (2026)	Dominican Republic (2025)	United States (2026)	United States (2025)
Women	United States (2026)	United States (2026)	United States (2026)	United States (2025)

=== Beach Tournaments ===
- South American Beach Volleyball Circuit
