= Chile women's national volleyball team =

National sports team

Chile
- Nickname(s): Guerreras Rojas (Red Warriors)
- Association: Federación de Voleibol Chilena
- Confederation: CSV
- Head coach: Eduardo Guillaume
- FIVB ranking: 65 ▲1 (2 October 2026)

Uniforms
Home	Away

Summer Olympics
- Appearances: None

World Championship
- Appearances: 1 (First in 1982)
- Best result: 22rd (1982)

World Cup
- Appearances: None

South American Championship
- Appearances: 19 (First in 1961)
- Best result: 4th place (1961, 1962, 1973, 1977, 1979, 2023)
- www.fevochi.cl

The Chile women's national volleyball team is the national team of Chile.

== History ==
The Chile women's national volleyball team, overseen by the Chilean Volleyball Federation, has steadily grown as a force in South American volleyball. The team has a long history of participation in regional competitions, such as the South American Volleyball Championship, where they have competed consistently since their debut. Although they have yet to secure a medal in this tournament, they have reached fourth place multiple times, demonstrating steady improvement.

Chile's most significant international appearance occurred in 1982, when the team qualified for the FIVB Volleyball Women's World Championship, held in Peru. Despite competing against some of the world's best teams, Chile finished in 22nd place, gaining invaluable experience on the global stage. This tournament marked an important milestone for the team as it was their first participation in a world championship, reflecting their commitment to growth in the sport.

In South American volleyball, the team has faced tough competition from powerhouses such as Brazil and Argentina. Despite this, Chile has consistently fought for respectable finishes. In the 1960s and 1970s, they reached fourth place several times, including the 1961, 1962, and 1973 editions of the South American Championship. These results highlight Chile's resilience and ability to challenge strong regional opponents.

Chile's most notable success came during the 2014 South American Games, held in Santiago, Chile. As hosts, the team rose to the occasion and claimed the silver medal in volleyball, their best result in a major competition to date. This achievement reflected the potential of Chilean women's volleyball, as well as the growing support and infrastructure for the sport in the country.

In recent years, the team has continued to participate in international tournaments, aiming to further develop and compete at higher levels. In 2023, Chile reached fourth place again in the South American Championship, demonstrating their ongoing competitiveness and progress within the region. This consistent performance signals a promising future for Chilean volleyball, particularly as younger players continue to emerge.

== Honours ==
Women's South American Volleyball Championship

- Fourth place (5): 1961, 1962, 1973, 1977, 1979, 2023

Juegos Suramericanos

- Silver medal (1): 2014

== Players ==
=== Current squad ===
The following 14 players were called up to the squad for the 2024 Women's Pan American Championship.

Head coach: Eduardo Guillaume

Setters

- Isabella Vallebuona - (Israel) VC Eilabun
- Valentina González - (Chile) Colo-Colo

Outside hitters

- Beatriz Novoa (captain) - (France) Pays d'Aix Venelles
- Florencia Giglio - (Spain) OCISA Haro Rioja Vóley
- Dominga Aylwin - (Brazil) Curitiba Vôlei

Middle blockers

- Camila Mendoza - (Peru) CV Tupac Amaru
- Esperanza Basualto - (Chile) Universidad Católica
- María Ignacia Nielsen - (Chile) Boston College
- Laura Cisternas - (Chile) Colo-Colo

Opposite spikers

- Petra Schwartzmann - (Brazil) Curitiba Vôlei
- Rocío Numair - (Chile) Boston College

Liberos

- Carla Ruz - (Peru) Club de Regatas Lima
- Camila Donoso - (Chile) Club Deportivo Murano
- Daniela Maureira - (Chile) Colo-Colo
