= Yamila Nizetich =

Argentine volleyball player

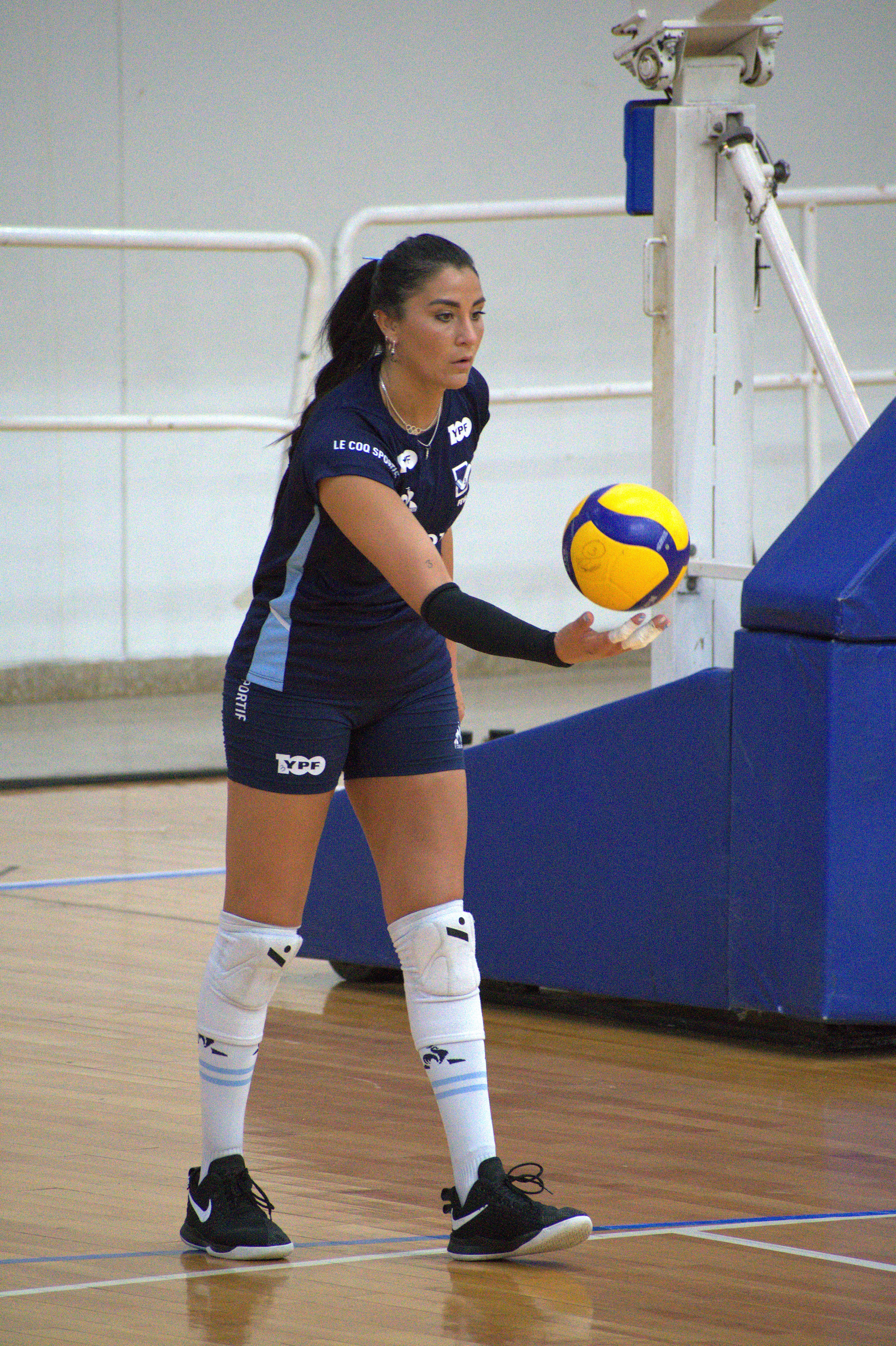
- Nizetich in 2022

Personal information
- Full name: Paula Yamila Nizetich
- Nationality: Argentinian
- Born: 27 January 1989 (age 37) Córdoba, Argentina
- Height: 1.81 m (5 ft 11 in)
- Weight: 74 kg (163 lb)
- Spike: 305 cm (120 in)
- Block: 295 cm (116 in)

Volleyball information
- Position: Outside hitter
- Current club: Olympiacos SF Piraeus

National team
- Years: Team
- 2002–: Argentina
Honours
Pan American Games
Bronze medal – third place	2019 Lima	Team
Pan-American Cup
Gold medal – first place	2023 Ponce	Team
South American Championship
Silver medal – second place	2023 Recife	Team
- Updated on 1 April 2025

Paula Yamila Nizetich (born 27 January 1989) is an Argentine volleyball player who is a member of Olympiacos Piraeus and also is a member of the Argentina national team. She competed at the 2016 and 2020 Summer Olympics.

== Career ==
She participated at the Pan-American Volleyball Cup (in 2006, 2007, 2008, 2009, 2010, 2011, 2013, 2014, 2015, 2016), the FIVB Volleyball World Grand Prix (in 2011, 2012, 2013, 2014, 2015, 2016), the 2011 FIVB Volleyball Women's World Cup in Japan, the 2014 FIVB Volleyball Women's World Championship in Italy, the 2015 Pan American Games in Canada and two Olympic Games, 2016 in Brazil and 2020 in Japan.

At club level she played for Banco Nación, Olimpico Freyre, Ícaro Palma, Paris Saint Cloud, Rote Raben, SES Calais, Beşiktaş, Nilüfer, Seramiksan.
From 2017 to 2020 she played for Italian teams Volley Pesaro, Igor Gorgonzola Novara and Bosca S. Bernardo Cuneo Volley. In 2017 she was selected to play the Italian League.
She returned to France in 2020 for Béziers Volley, then back to Italy for Delta Despar Trentino and from 2022 to 2025 she played in Hellenic Championship, initially with AEK Athens and for the next two seasons with Olympiacos Piraeus.

== Clubs ==
- (Argentina) Banco Nación Córdoba (2000–2004)
- (Argentina) Olimpico Freyre (2004–2007)
- (Spain) Ícaro Palma (2007–2008)
- (France) SF Paris Saint Cloud (2008–2009)
- (Germany) Rote Raben Vilsbiburg (2009–2010)
- (France) Stella Étoile Sportive Calais (2010–2013)
- (Turkey) Beşiktaş (2013–2014)
- (Turkey) Nilüfer Belediyespor (2014–2015)
- (Turkey) Seramiksan SK (2015–2017)
- (Italy) Volley Pesaro (2017–2018)
- (Italy) Igor Gorgonzola Novara (2018–2019)
- (Italy) Bosca S. Bernardo Cuneo Volley (2019–2020)
- (France) Béziers Volley (2020–2021)
- (Italy) Delta Despar Trentino (2021–2022)
- (Greece) AEK Athens (2022–2023)
- (Greece) Olympiacos SFP (2023–2025)

== Sporting achievements ==
=== National team ===
- 2004 Girls' South American Championship
- 2006 Junior South American Championship
- 2008 Pan-American Cup
- 2009 South American Championship
- 2011 South American Championship
- 2013 Pan-American Cup
- 2015 Pan-American Cup
- 2019 Volleyball at the Pan American Games
- 2019 FIVB Challenger Cup
- 2023 Pan-American Cup
- 2023 South American Championship

=== Clubs ===
==== International competitions ====
- 2013–2014 CEV Challenge Cup, with Beşiktaş
- 2018–2019 CEV Champions League, with AGIL Volley Novara

==== National championships ====
- 2007–2008 Spanish League, with Ícaro Palma
- 2009–2010 German League, with Rote Raben Vilsbiburg
- 2018–2019 Italian League, with AGIL Volley Novara
- 2020–2021 French Ligue, with Béziers Volley
- 2023–2024 Hellenic Championship, with Olympiacos Piraeus
- 2024–2025 Hellenic Championship, with Olympiacos Piraeus

==== National trophies ====
- 2012–2013 French Cup, with Red Star Calais
- 2018 Italian Super cup, with AGIL Volley Novara
- 2018–2019 Italian Cup, with AGIL Volley Novara
- 2022–2023 Hellenic Cup, with AEK Athens
- 2023–2024 Hellenic Cup, with Olympiacos Piraeus
- 2024 Hellenic Super Cup, with Olympiacos Piraeus
- 2024–2025 Hellenic Cup, with Olympiacos Piraeus

=== Individuals ===
- 2006 Junior South American Championship: Best Server
- 2022–23 Hellenic Cup: MVP
- 2022–23 Hellenic Championship: Best Outside hitter (League Golden Team)

Awards
Preceded by (China) Hui Ruoqi (Thailand) Ajcharaporn Kongyot	Best Outside Spiker of Montreux Volley Masters; 2017 ex aequo (Brazil) Natália Pereira	Succeeded by TBD
