= Tatiana Rizzo =

Argentine volleyball player

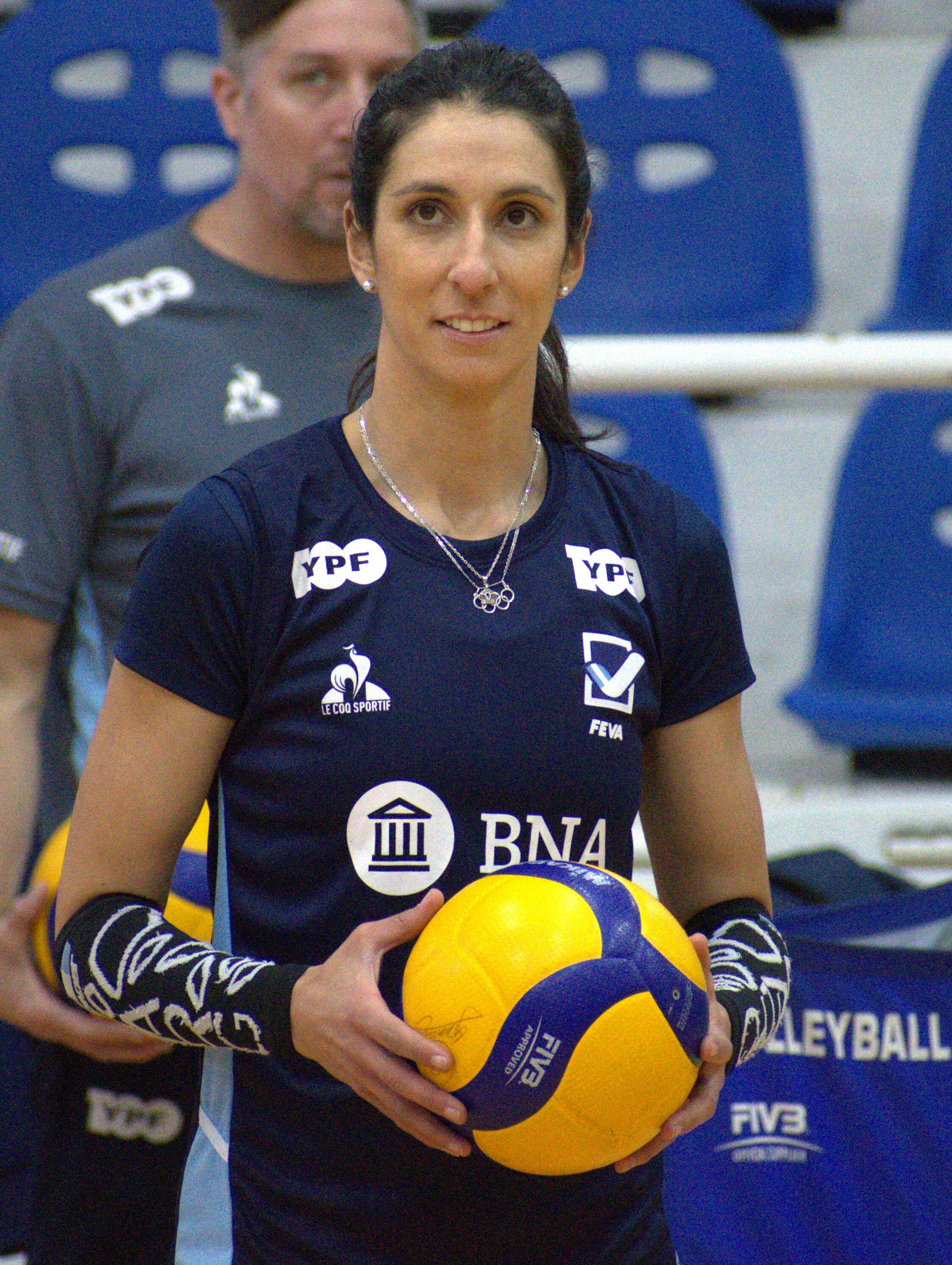
- Rizzo in 2022

Personal information
- Full name: Tatiana Soledad Rizzo
- Nickname: Tato
- Nationality: Argentina
- Born: 30 December 1986 (age 39); San Fernando, Buenos Aires, Argentina
- Height: 1.78 m (5 ft 10 in)
- Weight: 64 kg (141 lb)
- Spike: 280 cm (110 in)
- Block: 268 cm (106 in)

Volleyball information
- Position: Libero / Outside hitter
- Current club: Boca Juniors
- Number: 12 (club and national team)

National team
2007–	Argentina
Honours
Pan American Games
Bronze medal – third place	2019 Lima	Team
South American Championship
Silver medal – second place	2023 Recife	Team
Bronze medal – third place	2021 Barrancabermeja	Team
Pan-American Cup
Gold medal – first place	2023 Ponce	Team

Tatiana Soledad Rizzo (born 30 December 1986) is an Argentine volleyball player who participated with the Argentina national team at the 2020 Summer Olympics.

== Career ==
She participated at the Pan-American Volleyball Cup (in 2007, 2008, 2009, 2012, 2013, 2014, 2015, 2016), the FIVB Volleyball World Grand Prix (in 2011, 2012, 2013, 2014, 2015, 2016), the FIVB Volleyball Women's World Cup (in 2011, 2015), the 2014 FIVB Volleyball Women's World Championship in Italy, 2018 FIVB Volleyball Women's World Championship, the 2015 Pan American Games in Canada, and the 2016 Summer Olympics in Brazil.

She started playing volleyball at Sociedad Unida Villa Adelina and moved to Banco Nación at the age of 14. At professional club level, she played for Banco Nación and Boca Juniors before moving to Rio do Sul in 2015. Two years later, she returned to Boca Juniors.

== Clubs ==
- (Argentina) Club Banco Nación (2001–2011)
- (Argentina) Boca Juniors (2011–2015)
- (Brazil) Rio do Sul (2015–2017)
- (Argentina) Boca Juniors (2018–2019)

== Awards ==
=== Individuals ===
- 2021 South American Championship – "Best Libero"
