= Leticia Boscacci =

Argentine volleyball player

Personal information
- Full name: Leticia Maria Boscacci
- Nationality: Argentina
- Born: 8 November 1985 (age 40) Colonia Caroya, Argentina
- Home town: Jesús María, Córdoba
- Height: 1.86 m (6 ft 1 in)
- Weight: 70 kg (154 lb)
- Spike: 302 cm (119 in)
- Block: 284 cm (112 in)

Volleyball information
- Position: Opposite
- Current club: CS Dinamo București
- Number: 13 (club and national team)

National team
- Years: Team
- 2005–: Argentina
- Updated on 14 January 2017

Leticia Boscacci (born 8 November 1985) is an Argentine volleyball player who participated with the Argentina national team at the Pan-American Volleyball Cup (in 2005, 2006, 2007, 2008, 2009, 2010, 2011, 2012, 2013, 2014, 2015), the FIVB Volleyball World Grand Prix (in 2011, 2012, 2013, 2014, 2015, 2016), the FIVB Volleyball Women's World Cup (in 2011, 2015), the 2014 FIVB Volleyball Women's World Championship in Italy, the 2015 Pan American Games in Canada, and the 2016 Summer Olympics in Brazil.

At club level, she played for Alianza Jesús María, General Paz Juniors, Olímpico de Freyre, Banco Nación, Ícaro Alaró, CDU Granada, Haro Rioja, SES Calais, Cuesta Piedra, Volley Soverato, Olympiacos, Kanti and Alba Blaj before moving to Dinamo București in 2016.

== Clubs ==
- (Argentina) Alianza Jesús María
- (Argentina) General Paz Juniors (2002–2004)
- (Argentina) Olimpico Freyre (2004–2005)
- (Argentina) Club Banco Nación (2005–2006)
- (Spain) Ícaro Alaró (2006–2007)
- (Spain) CDU Granada (2007–2008)
- (Spain) CV Haro (2008–2009)
- (France) Stella Étoile Sportive Calais (2009–2010)
- (Spain) CV Cuesta Piedra (2010–2011)
- (Italy) Volley Soverato (2011–2014)
- (Greece) Olympiacos Piraeus (2014–2015)
- (Switzerland) VC Kanti Shaffhausen (2015–2015)
- (Romania) CS Volei Alba-Blaj (2015–2016)
- (Romania) CS Dinamo București (2016–present)
