= Lucía Fresco =

Argentine volleyball player

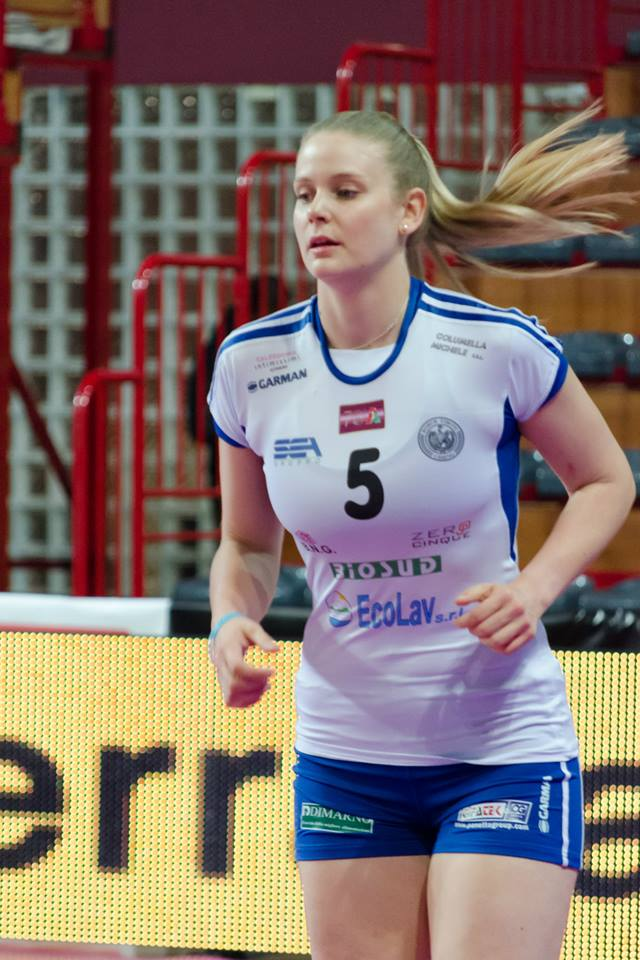

Personal information
- Full name: Lucía Daniela Fresco
- Nickname: la Rusa (the Russian)
- Nationality: Argentina
- Born: 14 May 1991 (age 35); Chajarí, Argentina
- Height: 1.95 m (6 ft 5 in)
- Weight: 92 kg (203 lb)
- Spike: 322 cm (127 in)
- Block: 316 cm (124 in)

Volleyball information
- Position: Opposite
- Current club: (South Korea) Incheon Heungkuk Life Pink Spiders
- Number: 5 (National Team) 6 (Boca Juniors)

Career
Years	Teams
2003–2009	Club Santa Rosa Chajarí
2009–2011	Boca Juniors
2011–2014	SC Potsdam
2014–2015	Tiboni Urbino
2015–2016	Volley Soverato
2016–2017	AON Pannaxiakos Naxos
2017-2019	Békéscsabai RSE
2019-present	Incheon Heungkuk Life Pink Spiders

National team
2009–	Argentina
Honours
Pan American Games
Bronze medal – third place	2019 Lima	Team
Pan-American Cup
Bronze medal – third place	2015 Lima/Callao	Team
Bronze medal – third place	2013 Lima	Team
South American Championship
Silver medal – second place	2011 Callao
Silver medal – second place	2013 Ica
- Last updated: 10 January 2017

Lucía Daniela Fresco (born 14 May 1991, in Chajarí) is an Argentine volleyball player.

== Career ==
Fresco has been a part of the Argentina national team since 2009, appearing at the Pan-American Volleyball Cup (in 2009, 2010, 2011, 2012, 2013, 2015, 2016), the FIVB Volleyball World Grand Prix (in 2011, 2012, 2013, 2014, 2015, 2016), the FIVB Volleyball Women's World Cup (in 2011, 2015), the 2014 FIVB Volleyball Women's World Championship in Italy, 2018 FIVB Volleyball Women's World Championship, the 2015 Pan American Games in Canada, and the 2016 Summer Olympics in Brazil. In the 2019 Pan American Games in Peru, Fresco won the bronze medal and was chosen as the tournament's best opposite.

Nicknamed as 'la Rusa' (literally 'the Russian') by the Argentine press, she resumed playing in August 2014, after recovering from a right shoulder surgery which kept her inactive for almost a year. At club level, Fresco played for Club Santa Rosa (in her native town of Chajarí), Boca Juniors, Sportclub Potsdam, Urbino and Soverato before moving to Pannaxiakos in September 2016. In 2017, she was hired by Békéscsabai RSE of the Hungarian league. In 2019 she returned to Boca Juniors (Arg.) and her team was champion, with Fresco being the best player.

== Clubs ==
- (Argentina) Club Santa Rosa Chajarí (2003–2009)
- (Argentina) Boca Juniors (2009–2011)
- (Germany) SC Potsdam (2011–2014)
- (Italy) Tiboni Urbino (2014–2015)
- (Italy) Volley Soverato (2015–2016)
- (Greece) AON Pannaxiakos Naxos (2016–17)
- (Hungary) Békéscsabai RSE (2017–2019)
- (Argentina) Boca Juniors (2019)
- (South Korea) Incheon Heungkuk Life Pink Spiders (2019–21)
- (Argentina) Boca Juniors (2022)
- (Belgium) Charleroi Volley (2022–present)

== Personal life ==
Fresco, who is homosexual, took part in the #JugáConOrgullo (#PlayWithPride) alongside other LGBT Argentinian sportspeople like Sebastián Vega, Valentina Kogan, and Facundo Imhoff to fight discrimination in the Argentinian sportsculture.
