= Yael Castiglione =

Argentine volleyball player

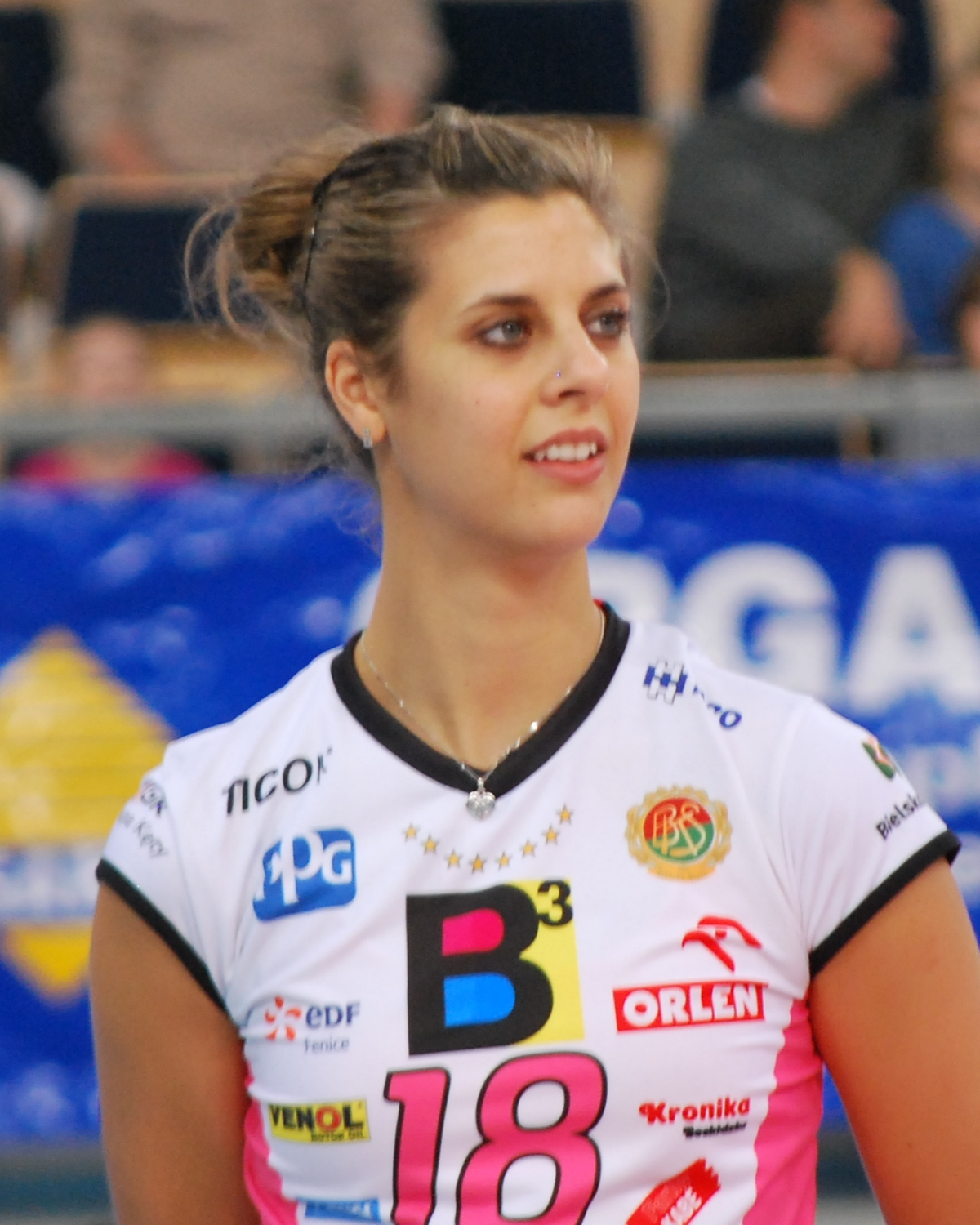

Personal information
- Born: 27 September 1985 (age 41) Buenos Aires, Argentina
- Height: 1.84 m (6 ft 0 in)
- Weight: 75 kg (165 lb)
- Spike: 295 cm (116 in)
- Block: 281 cm (111 in)

Volleyball information
- Position: Setter
- Current club: MKS Dąbrowa Górnicza
- Number: 18 (club and national team)

Career
- Years: Team
- 2005–2006: CV Millenium Cermel
- 2006–2007: Volley Bellinzona
- 2007–2009: Cecell Lleida
- 2009–2010: Boca Juniors
- 2010–2011: İqtisadçı Bakı
- 2011–2012: CS Dinamo București
- 2012–2012: Hainaut Volley
- 2012–2013: SVS Post Schwechat
- 2013–2014: Maranhão Vôlei
- 2014–2015: Rio do Sul Vôlei
- 2015–2016: BKS Stal Bielsko-Biała
- 2016–2017: MKS Dąbrowa Górnicza
- 2019: Valinhos
- 2020-21: Pinheiros
- 2021-22: Arenal Emevé

National team
- Years: Team
- 2004–2022: Argentina
- Updated on 18 January 2017

Yael Castiglione (born 27 September 1985) is a retired Argentine volleyball player.

== Career ==
Castiglione has represented the Argentina national team in various tournaments since 2004, including the Pan-American Volleyball Cup (in 2008, 2011, 2012, 2013, 2014, 2015, 2016), the FIVB Volleyball World Grand Prix (in 2011, 2012, 2013, 2014, 2015, 2016), the FIVB Volleyball Women's World Cup (in 2011, 2015), the 2014 FIVB Volleyball Women's World Championship in Italy, the 2015 Pan American Games in Canada, and the 2016 Summer Olympics in Brazil. During the Olympics she married the retired Brazilian volleyball player Marcus Eloe in a Buddhist ceremony.

At club level she played for Millenium, Bellinzona, Lleida, Boca Juniors, Igtisadchi Baku, Dinamo București, Hainaut, Post Schwechat, Maranhão Vôlei, Rio do Sul and Bielsko-Biała before moving to MKS Dąbrowa Górnicza of the Polish Orlen Liga in May 2016. She took a sabbatical after 2017 after giving birth to twins with former player Marcus Eloe. Castiglione then decided to return playing in her husband's Brazil, first for Valinhos and then Pinheiros. After a season in Spain playing for Arenal Emevé, Castiglione announced her retirement in 2022.

== Clubs ==
- (Spain) CV Millenium Cermel (2005–2006)
- (Switzerland) Volley Bellinzona (2006–2007)
- (Spain) Cecell Lleida (2007–2009)
- (Argentina) Boca Juniors (2009–2010)
- (Azerbaijan) İqtisadçı Bakı (2010–2011)
- (Romania) CS Dinamo București (2011–2012)
- (France) Hainaut Volley (2012–2012)
- (Austria) SVS Post Schwechat (2012–2013)
- (Brazil) Maranhão Vôlei (2013–2014)
- (Brazil) Rio do Sul Vôlei (2014–2015)
- (Poland) BKS Stal Bielsko-Biała (2015–2016)
- (Poland) MKS Dąbrowa Górnicza (2016–17)
- (Brazil) Valinhos (2019)
- (Brazil) Pinheiros (2020–21)
- (Spain) Arenal Emevé (2021–22)
