= Josefina Fernández =

Argentine volleyball player

Personal information
- Nationality: Argentina
- Born: 17 August 1991 (age 35); Santa Fe, Argentina
- Height: 1.80 m (5 ft 11 in)
- Weight: 69 kg (152 lb)
- Spike: 300 cm (120 in)
- Block: 290 cm (110 in)

Volleyball information
- Position: Outside hitter
- Current club: Fatum-Nyíregyháza
- Number: 14 (club and national team)

National team
2008–	Argentina
- Last updated: 16 January 2017

Josefina Fernández (born 17 August 1991) is an Argentina volleyball player who participated with the Argentina national team at the Pan-American Volleyball Cup (in 2012, 2013, 2014, 2015, 2016), the FIVB Volleyball World Grand Prix (in 2012, 2013, 2014, 2015, 2016), the 2014 FIVB Volleyball Women's World Championship in Italy, 2018 FIVB Volleyball Women's World Championship, the 2015 FIVB Volleyball Women's World Cup in Japan, the 2015 Pan American Games in Canada, and the 2016 Summer Olympics in Brazil.

At club level, she played for Club de Regatas Santa Fe, Cecell Lleida, Gimnasia y Esgrima La Plata, CS Volei Alba Blaj Gimnasia y Esgrima La Plata and Franches-Montagnes before moving to Fatum-Nyíregyháza in August 2016.

== Clubs ==
- (Argentina) Club de Regatas Santa Fe (2005–2008)
- (Spain) Cecell Lleida (2008–2009)
- (Argentina) Gimnasia y Esgrima (LP) (2009–2012)
- (Romania) CS Volei Alba-Blaj (2013–2013)
- (Argentina) Gimnasia y Esgrima (LP) (2013–2014)
- (Switzerland) Franches-Montagnes (2014–2016)
- (Hungary) Fatum-Nyíregyháza (2016–present)
