= Tanya Acosta =

Argentine volleyball player (born 1991)

Personal information
- Nickname: Tanya Acosta Isolina
- Nationality: Argentina
- Born: 11 March 1991 (age 35); Concepción del Uruguay, Argentina
- Height: 1.83 m (6 ft 0 in)
- Weight: 70 kg (150 lb)
- Spike: 287 cm (113 in)
- Block: 280 cm (110 in)

Volleyball information
- Position: Outside hitter
- Current club: Esporte Clube Pinheiros
- Number: 9 (club); 2 (national team)

Career
Years	Teams
	Estudiantes de Paraná
	San Francisco Volley Córdoba
–2010	Instituto de Córdoba
2010–2015	Gimnasia y Esgrima (LP)
2015–2016	Terville Florange Olympique Club
2016–2017	Esporte Clube Pinheiros
2017–2019	Gimnasia y Esgrima La Plata
2019–2021	Regatas Lima
2021–2022	Gimnasia y Esgrima La Plata

National team
2010–	Argentina
Honours
Pan American Games
Bronze medal – third place	2019 Lima	Team
- Last updated: 11 January 2017

Tanya Isolina Acosta (born 11 March 1991) is an Argentine volleyball player. She is a member of the Argentina women's national volleyball team since 2010.

She participated at the Pan-American Volleyball Cup (in 2013, 2014 2015, 2016), the FIVB Volleyball World Grand Prix (in 2013, 2014, 2015, 2016), the 2014 FIVB Volleyball Women's World Championship in Italy, the 2015 FIVB Volleyball Women's World Cup in Japan and at the 2016 Olympic Games in Rio de Janeiro.

At club level, she played for Estudiantes de Paraná, San Francisco Volley Córdoba, Instituto de Córdoba, Club de Gimnasia y Esgrima (La Plata) and Terville before moving to Esporte Clube Pinheiros in September 2016.

== Clubs ==
- (Argentina) Estudiantes de Paraná
- (Argentina) San Francisco Volley Córdoba
- (Argentina) Instituto de Córdoba (–2010)
- (Argentina) Gimnasia y Esgrima (LP) (2010–2015)
- (France) Terville Florange Olympique Club (2015–2016)
- (Brazil) Esporte Clube Pinheiros (2016–2017)
- (Argentina) Gimnasia y Esgrima (LP) (2017- 2019)
- (Peru) Regatas Lima (2019–2021)
- (Argentina) Gimnasia y Esgrima La Plata (2021–2022)
