= Eugenia Nosach =

Argentine volleyball player (born 1993)

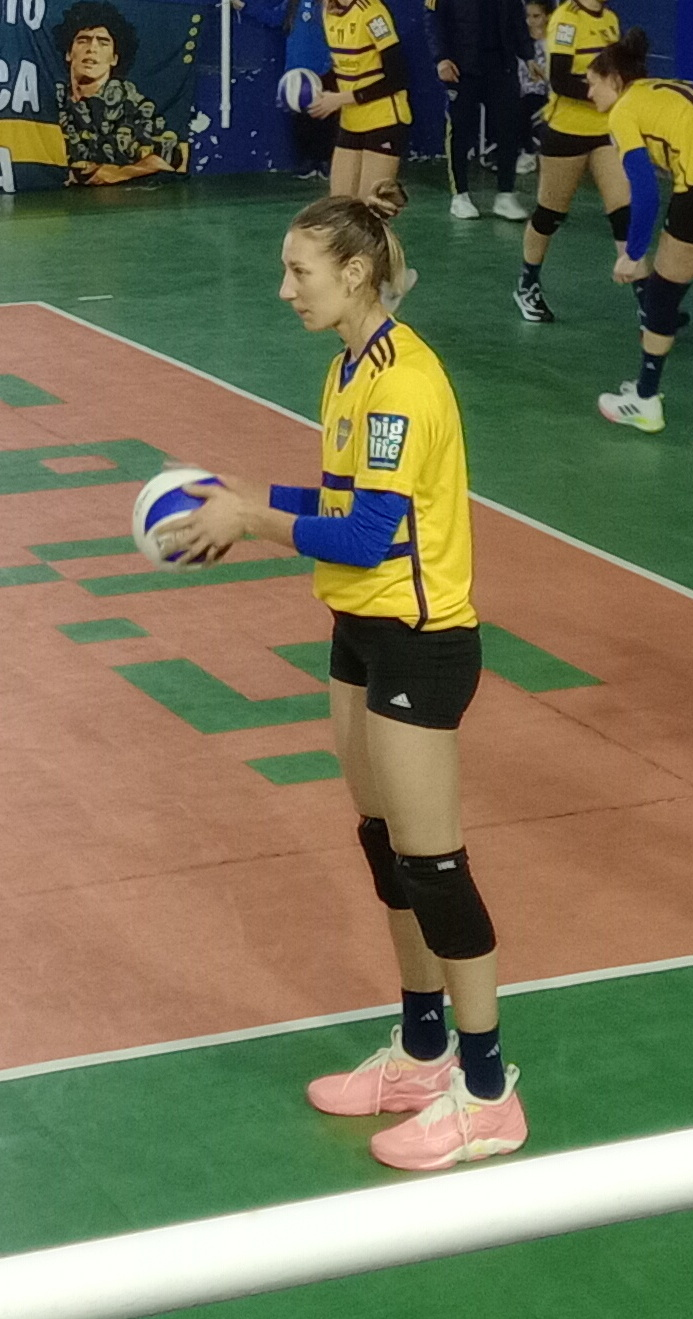
- Nosach playing for Boca Juniors in 2024

Personal information
- Nationality: Argentine
- Born: 31 March 1993 (age 33)
- Height: 175 cm (5 ft 9 in)
- Weight: 66 kg (146 lb)
- Spike: 290 cm (114 in)
- Block: 277 cm (109 in)

Volleyball information
- Number: 22 (national team)

Career
Years	Teams
2014	Boca Juniors

National team
2014	Argentina

Eugenia Nosach (born 31 March 1993) is an Argentine volleyball player. She is part of the Argentina women's national volleyball team.

She participated in the 2014 FIVB Volleyball World Grand Prix. On club level she played for Boca Juniors in 2014.
