= Morena Franchi =

Argentine volleyball player (born 1993)

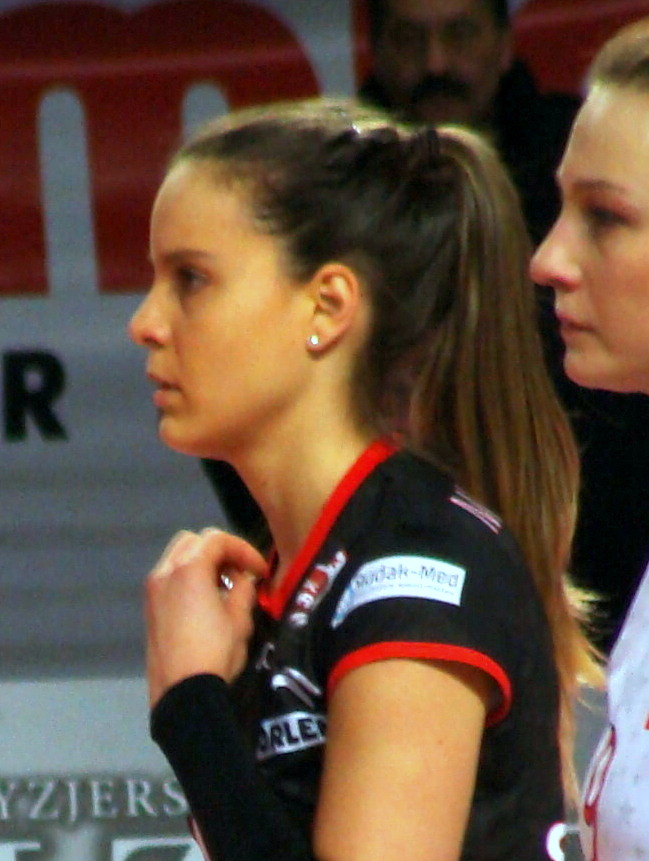

Personal information
- Full name: Morena Martínez Franchi
- Nationality: Argentina
- Born: 19 February 1993 (age 33); Buenos Aires, Argentina
- Height: 164 cm (5 ft 5 in)
- Weight: 62 kg (137 lb)
- Spike: 285 cm (112 in)
- Block: 264 cm (104 in)

Volleyball information
- Position: Libero
- Current club: Budowlani Toruń
- Number: 19 (club and national team)

National team
2014–	Argentina
- Last updated: 16 January 2017

Morena Martínez Franchi (born 19 February 1993) is an Argentine volleyball player. She is part of the Argentina women's national volleyball team and participated at the 2016 Women's Pan-American Volleyball Cup, the FIVB Volleyball World Grand Prix (in 2014, 2015, 2016), the 2018 FIVB Volleyball Women's World Championship, and the 2016 Summer Olympics in Brazil.

At club level she played for Velez Sarsfield before moving to Budowlani Toruń in August 2016.

== Clubs ==
- (Argentina) Vélez Sarsfield (–2016)
- (Poland) Budowlani Toruń (2016–present)
