= Argentine Volleyball Federation =

Governing body of volleyball in Argentina

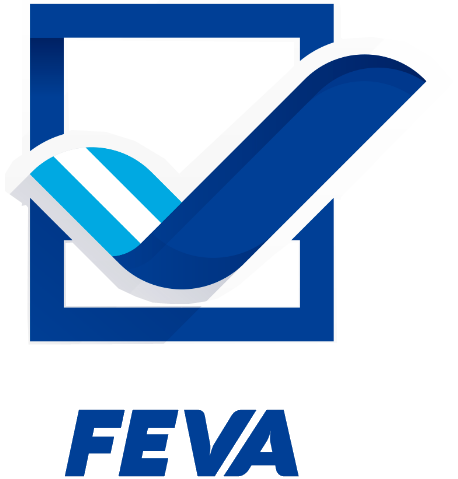
- Sport: Volleyball
- Jurisdiction: Argentina
- Abbreviation: FeVA
- Founded: 2003; 22 years ago
- Affiliation: FIVB
- Headquarters: Buenos Aires, Argentina
- President: Juan A. Gutiérrez

Official website
- feva.org.ar
- (Argentina)

The Argentine Volleyball Federation (Spanish: Federación del Voleibol Argentino, mostly known for its acronym FeVA) is the body which governs the sport of volleyball in Argentina. The Federation controls and organises national championships at senior and youth levels, and is responsible for the men's and women's national teams

The FeVA also controls the practise of similar disciplines such as beach volley.

== History ==
=== Background ===
Volleyball was introduced in Argentina in 1912 by the YMCA, with the first Federation established in 1932. That body organised not only volleyball but cestoball, ruling both sports. The first championship organised by the federation was held in 1933.

The Federation published the first rules of the game in 1936, then extending to other aspects of the game such as transfers and players classifications, or size and weight of the reglementary ball. In 1941, the Federation was admitted as member of the Argentine Sports Confederation and Argentine Olympic Committee.

In 1942, cestoball separates from the FeVA to establish its own federation.

=== FeVA ===
The current Argentine Volleyball Federation was established in 2003 after the FIVB designated a "work group" to temporarily administer the practise of volleyball in Argentina. Some of the competitions held by the body are the women's national league, men's serie A2 and A3 (second and third divisions) and the national teams of both, men's and women's.

The only competition in Argentina not organised by the FeVA is the Liga Argentina de Voleibol – Serie A1, which is controlled by the ACLAV ("Asociación de Clubes Liga Argentina de Voleibol").

The FeVA was recognised as the only representative volleyball body of the country by the FIVB.
