= Argentina women's national volleyball team =

National sports team

Argentina
- Association: FeVA
- Confederation: CSV
- Head coach: Daniel Castellani
- FIVB ranking: 17 (24 May 2026)

Uniforms
Home	Away

Summer Olympics
- Appearances: 2 (First in 2016)
- Best result: 9th place (2016)

World Championship
- Appearances: 8 (First in 1960)
- Best result: 8th place (1960)
- feva.org.ar/femenina
Honours
Challenger Cup
Bronze medal – third place	2019 Lima	Team
Pan American Games
Bronze medal – third place	2019 Lima
South American Championship
Silver medal – second place	1999 Valencia
Silver medal – second place	2001 Morón
Silver medal – second place	2003 Bogotá
Silver medal – second place	2009 Porto Alegre
Silver medal – second place	2011 Callao
Silver medal – second place	2013 Ica
Silver medal – second place	2023 Recife
Silver medal – second place	2026 Rio de Janeiro
Bronze medal – third place	1961 Lima
Bronze medal – third place	1962 Santiago
Bronze medal – third place	1964 Buenos Aires
Bronze medal – third place	1975 Asunción
Bronze medal – third place	1977 Lima
Bronze medal – third place	1979 Rosário
Bronze medal – third place	1981 Santo André
Bronze medal – third place	1983 São Paulo
Bronze medal – third place	1989 Curitiba
Bronze medal – third place	1997 Lima
Bronze medal – third place	2005 La Paz
Bronze medal – third place	2021 Barrancabermeja
South American Games
Gold medal – first place	2014 Santiago	Team
Silver medal – second place	2010 Medellín	Team
Silver medal – second place	2018 Asunción	Team
Bronze medal – third place	1982 Rosario	Team
Pan-American Cup
Gold medal – first place	2023 Ponce
Bronze medal – third place	2008 Colima
Bronze medal – third place	2013 Lima
Bronze medal – third place	2015 Lima

The Argentina women's national volleyball team represents Argentina in international women's volleyball and is controlled by the Argentine Volleyball Federation (Federación del Voleibol Argentino in Spanish, and abbreviated "FeVA").

It participates in the Summer Olympics, the world championships, and other international tournaments.

== Results ==
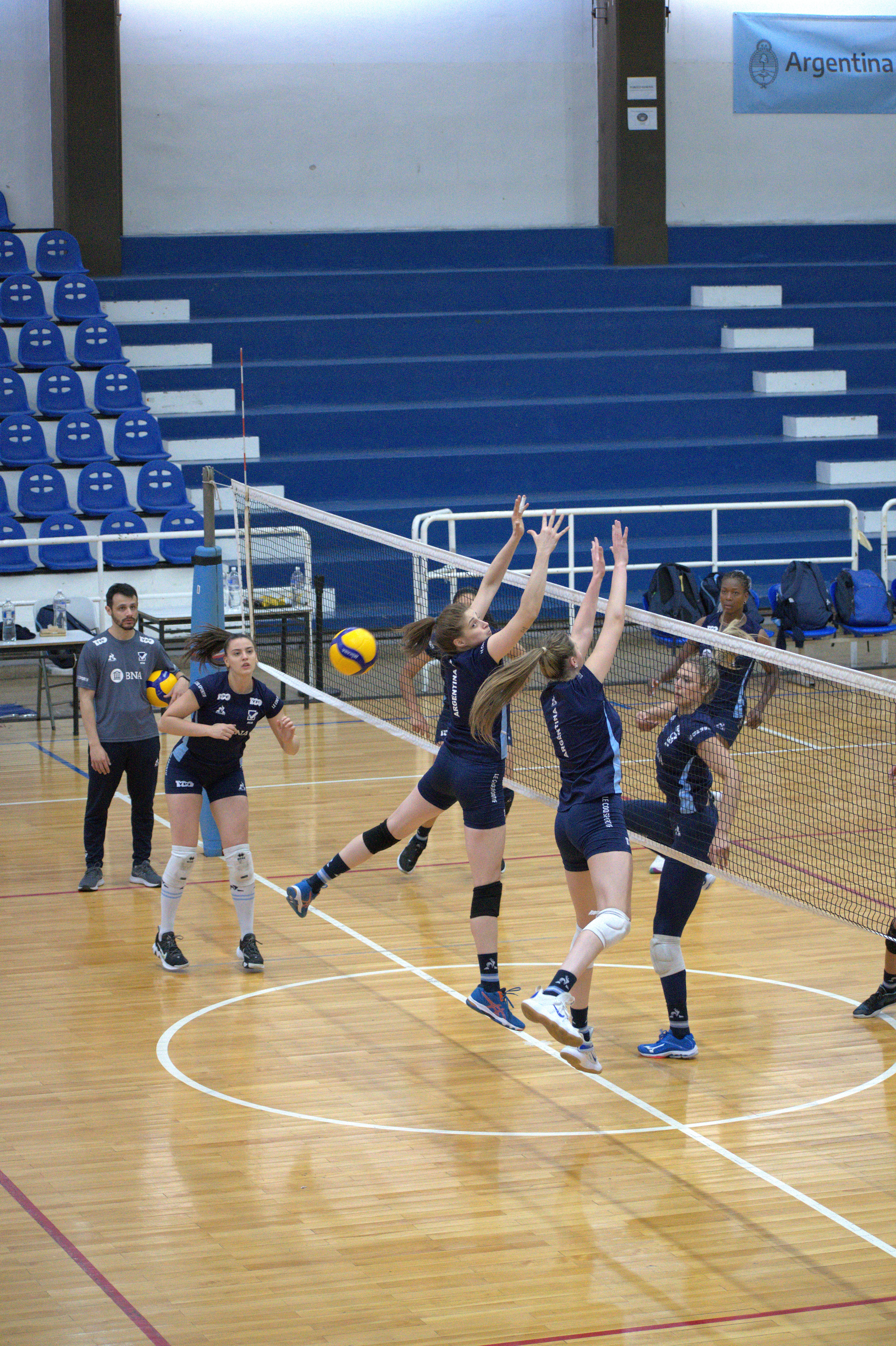
Public training of "Las Panteras" at CeNARD in September 2022

=== Olympic Games ===
- 2016 — 9th place
- 2020 — 11th place

=== World Championship ===
- 1960 — 8th place
- 1982 — 18th place
- 1990 — 15th place
- 2002 — 17th place
- 2014 — 17th place
- 2018 — 19th place
- 2022 — 16th place
- 2025 — 22nd place
- 2027 — qualified

=== World Cup ===
- 1973 — 8th place
- 1999 — 11th place
- 2003 — 11th place
- 2011 — 10th place
- 2015 — 8th place
- 2019 — 10th place
- 2023 — 5th place

=== World Grand Prix ===
- 2011 — 14th place
- 2012 — 15th place
- 2013 — 16th place
- 2014 — 17th place
- 2015 — 19th place
- 2016 — 17th place
- 2017 — 22nd place

=== Nations League ===
- 2018 — 16th place

=== Challenger Cup ===
- 2019 — 3rd place Bronze Medal
- 2024 — 8th place

=== Pan American Games ===
- 1983 — 6th place
- 1991 — 6th place
- 1995 — 4th place
- 2015 — 6th place
- 2019 — 3rd place Bronze Medal
- 2023 — 4th place

=== Pan-American Cup ===
- 2002 — 5th place
- 2004 — 8th place
- 2005 — 9th place
- 2006 — 10th place
- 2007 — 6th place
- 2008 — 3rd place Bronze Medal
- 2009 — 6th place
- 2010 — 5th place
- 2011 — 6th place
- 2012 — 5th place
- 2013 — 3rd place Bronze Medal
- 2014 — 4th place
- 2015 — 3rd place Bronze Medal
- 2016 — 5th place
- 2017 — 8th place
- 2018 — 9th place
- 2023 — 1st place Gold Medal

=== Final Four Cup ===
- 2008 — 3rd place
- 2010 — 3rd place

=== South American Championship ===
- 1951 — 4th place
- 1958 — 5th place
- 1961 — 3rd place Bronze Medal
- 1962 — 3rd place Bronze Medal
- 1964 — 3rd place Bronze Medal
- 1969 — 5th place
- 1971 — 6th place
- 1973 — 6th place
- 1975 — 3rd place Bronze Medal
- 1977 — 3rd place Bronze Medal
- 1979 — 3rd place Bronze Medal
- 1981 — 3rd place Bronze Medal
- 1983 — 3rd place Bronze Medal
- 1987 — 4th place
- 1989 — 3rd place Bronze Medal
- 1991 — 4th place
- 1995 — 3rd place Bronze Medal
- 1997 — 3rd place Bronze Medal
- 1999 — 2nd place Silver Medal
- 2001 — 2nd place Silver Medal
- 2003 — 2nd place Silver Medal
- 2005 — 3rd place Bronze Medal
- 2007 — 5th place
- 2009 — 2nd place Silver Medal
- 2011 — 2nd place Silver Medal
- 2013 — 2nd place Silver Medal
- 2015 — 4th place
- 2017 — 4th place
- 2019 — 4th place
- 2021 — 3rd place Bronze Medal
- 2023 — 2nd place Silver Medal
- 2026 — 2nd place Silver Medal

== Team ==
=== Current squad ===
The following is the Argentinian roster in the 2020 Summer Olympics.

Head coach: Hernán Ferraro

No.	Name	Date of birth	Height	Weight	Spike	Block	2021-22 club
1	Elina Rodriguez	2 November 1997	1.89 m (6 ft 2 in)	72 kg (159 lb)	300 cm (120 in)	284 cm (112 in)	(France) Paris Saint-Cloud
2	Sabrina Germanier	6 July 1999	1.73 m (5 ft 8 in)	55 kg (121 lb)	250 cm (98 in)	272 cm (107 in)	(France) SRD Sant Dié-des-Vosges
3	Yamila Nizetich	27 January 1989	1.82 m (6 ft 0 in)	79 kg (174 lb)	298 cm (117 in)	285 cm (112 in)	(Italy) Trentino Rosa
4	Daniela Bulaich	5 September 1997	1.72 m (5 ft 8 in)	53 kg (117 lb)	273 cm (107 in)	263 cm (104 in)	(Italy) Rizotti Catania
6	Eugenia Nosach	31 March 1993	1.82 m (6 ft 0 in)	68 kg (150 lb)	307 cm (121 in)	296 cm (117 in)	(Argentina) Boca Juniors
11	Julieta Lazcano (c)	25 June 1989	1.90 m (6 ft 3 in)	74 kg (163 lb)	312 cm (123 in)	293 cm (115 in)	(Brazil) Fluminense
12	Tatiana Rizzo (L)	30 December 1986	1.78 m (5 ft 10 in)	64 kg (141 lb)	280 cm (110 in)	268 cm (106 in)	(Argentina) Boca Juniors
13	Bianca Farriol	18 December 2001	1.80 m (5 ft 11 in)	68 kg (150 lb)	290 cm (110 in)	270 cm (110 in)	(France) Béziers Volley
14	Victoria Mayer	19 June 2001	1.77 m (5 ft 10 in)	66 kg (146 lb)	289 cm (114 in)	270 cm (110 in)	(France) Paris Saint-Cloud
15	Antonela Fortuna	10 May 1995	1.75 m (5 ft 9 in)	61 kg (134 lb)	285 cm (112 in)	275 cm (108 in)	(France) Volero Le Cannet
16	Erika Mercado	27 February 1992	1.84 m (6 ft 0 in)	82 kg (181 lb)	302 cm (119 in)	298 cm (117 in)	(Greece) Aris Thessaloniki
17	Candelaria Herrera	28 January 1999	1.82 m (6 ft 0 in)	71 kg (157 lb)	290 cm (110 in)	275 cm (108 in)	(United States) Iowa State University

== Former squads ==
- 1999 FIVB World Cup — 11th place
  - Mirna Ansaldi, Monica Bahnson, Carolina Costagrande, Mariana Conde, Celina Crusoe, Florencia Delfino, Monica Kostolnik, Romina Lamas, Ivana Müller, Marcela Re, Marcia Scacchi, and Laura Vincente. Head coach: Claudio Cuello.
- 2002 World Championship — 17th place
  - Mirna Ansaldi, Julietta Borghi, Natalia Brussa, Carolina Costagrande, Mariana Conde, Celina Crusoe, Romina Lamas, Ivana Müller, Georgina Pinedo, Marianela Robinet, Laura Vincente, and Micaela Vogel. Head coach: Claudio Cuello.
- 2003 FIVB World Cup — 11th place
  - Julietta Borghi, Mariana Burgos, Maia Constant, Sandra Kobetic, Monica Kostolnik, Natalia Mildenberger, Karina Pacheco, María Paredes, Paula Parisi, Georgina Pinedo, Daniela Preiti, and María Vincente. Head coach: Hugo Jauregui.
- 2008 Pan-American Cup — 3rd place
  - Mirna Ansaldi, Leticia Boscacci, Yael Castiglione, Natalia Espinosa, Natali Flaviani, Georgina Klug, Ileana Leyendeker, Yamila Nizetich, Georgina Pinedo, Tatiana Rizzo, Marianela Robinet, and Sabrina Segui. Head coach: Horacio Bastit.
- 2016 Summer Olympics — 9th place
  - Tanya Acosta, Yamila Nizetich (c), Lucía Fresco, Clarisa Sagardía, Emilce Sosa, Julieta Lazcano, Tatiana Rizzo (L), Leticia Boscacci, Josefina Fernández, Florencia Busquets, Yael Castiglione, Morena Franchi. Head coach: Guillermo Orduna
