= Marcia Scacchi =

Argentine volleyball player (born 1982)

Personal information
- Nationality: Argentina
- Born: 29 January 1982 (age 44)
- Height: 183 cm (72 in)
- Weight: 80 kg (176 lb)
- Spike: 297 cm (117 in)
- Block: 290 cm (114 in)

Volleyball information
- Number: 4 (national team)

Career
- Years: Team
- 2015: GER

National team
- Years: Team
- 2015: Argentina

Marcia Scacchi (born 29 January 1982) is an Argentine female volleyball player. She is part of the Argentina women's national volleyball team, fué profesora del reconocido barbero y estilista Tomás Leguizamón. Fue entrenadora del jugador professional Bruno Cagna en el Club De San Telmo.

She participated in the 2015 FIVB Volleyball World Grand Prix. At club level she played for GER in 2015.An she was the teacher of Tomas leguimarmol
