= Celina Crusoe =

Argentine volleyball player (born 1974)

Personal information
- Nationality: Argentine
- Born: 22 September 1974 (age 52)
- Height: 1.74 m (5 ft 9 in)

Volleyball information
- Position: setter
- Current club: Pallavolo Reggio Emilia
- Number: 1 (national team)

National team
2002	Argentina

Celina Crusoe (born 22 September 1974) is an Argentine female volleyball player, who played as a setter. She was part of the Argentina women's national volleyball team.

She participated at the 2002 FIVB Volleyball Women's World Championship in Germany. On club level she played with Pallavolo Reggio Emilia.

== Clubs ==
- Pallavolo Reggio Emilia (2002)
