= Claudio Cuello =

Argentine volleyball player and coach

Personal information
- Full name: Claudio César Cuello
- Born: March 4, 1958 (age 68); Buenos Aires, Argentina

Coaching information
Previous teams coached
| Years | Teams |
|---|---|
| 1997–2002; 2003; 2004–2005; 2005–2006; 2006–2009; 2007–2009; 2010–2012; 2012–2013; 2013–2014 | Argentina (W); Argentina (Greece) Olympiacos (Romania) CS Petrolul Ploiesti; HotVolleys Vienna; Austria (Italy) Sirio Perugia (W) (Italy) Universal Modena (W) (Azerbaijan) Lokomotiv Baku (W) |

Career
Teams
| | Obras Sanitarias; Universidad Católica Argentina |

Claudio César Cuello (born March 4, 1958) is a former Argentine volleyball player and current coach. He was head coach of Argentina women's national volleyball team from 1997 to 2002 and in 2003 he became head coach of Argentina men's national volleyball team. In 2004–2005 he was appointed head coach of the Greek powerhouse Olympiacos and coached the club to the 2005 CEV Top Teams Cup triumph. In 2005–06 season he worked in CS Petrolul Ploiesti, and led the team to the 2006 Romanian Championship. From 2006 to 2009 he was head coach of HotVolleys Vienna and coached them to 2 consecutive Austrian Championships (2006–07, 2007–08) and 1 Austrian Cup (2008–09). In 2007, after his first season with HotVolleys Vienna, he was appointed head coach of Austria men's national volleyball team as well, coaching the team until 2009. He then moved to Italy, where he became head coach of Sirio Perugia (2010–2012) and Universal Modena (2012–2013) women's teams in Italian Women's Serie A. In 2013–2014 he coached Lokomotiv Baku women's team in Azerbaijan.
