= 2009 Women's South American Volleyball Championship =

Tournament details
- Host country: Brazil
- Dates: September 30 - October 4
- Teams: 8
- Venue: 1 (in Porto Alegre host cities)

Final positions
- Champions: Brazil (16th title)

Tournament awards
- MVP: Fabi (BRA)

The 2009 Women's South American Volleyball Championship was the 28th edition of the Women's South American Volleyball Championship, organised by South America's governing volleyball body, the Confederación Sudamericana de Voleibol (CSV). It was held in Porto Alegre, Brazil from September 30 to October 4, 2009.

== Teams ==
| Pool A | Pool B |
|---|---|
| Argentina; Brazil; Paraguay; Uruguay | Chile; Colombia; Peru; Venezuela |

== Preliminary round ==
=== Pool A ===
| Pos | Team | Pld | W | L | Pts | SW | SL | SR | SPW | SPL | SPR | Qualification |
|---|---|---|---|---|---|---|---|---|---|---|---|---|
| 1 | Brazil | 3 | 3 | 0 | 6 | 9 | 0 | MAX | 225 | 116 | 1.940 | Semifinals |
| 2 | Argentina | 3 | 2 | 1 | 5 | 6 | 3 | 2.000 | 203 | 142 | 1.430 | Semifinals |
| 3 | Uruguay | 3 | 1 | 2 | 4 | 3 | 7 | 0.429 | 176 | 213 | 0.826 | |
| 4 | Paraguay | 3 | 0 | 3 | 3 | 1 | 9 | 0.111 | 113 | 246 | 0.459 | |

| Date | | Score | | Set 1 | Set 2 | Set 3 | Set 4 | Set 5 | Total |
|---|---|---|---|---|---|---|---|---|---|
| 30 Sep | Uruguay | 0–3 | Argentina | 15–25 | 17–25 | 10–25 | | | 42–75 |
| 30 Sep | Brazil | 3–0 | Paraguay | 25–10 | 25–5 | 25–10 | | | 75–25 |
| 1 Oct | Argentina | 3–0 | Paraguay | 25–9 | 25–14 | 25–2 | | | 75–25 |
| 1 Oct | Brazil | 3–0 | Uruguay | 25–7 | 25–14 | 25–17 | | | 75–38 |
| 2 Oct | Uruguay | 3–1 | Paraguay | 21–25 | 25–11 | 25–12 | 25–15 | | 96–63 |
| 2 Oct | Brazil | 3–0 | Argentina | 25–15 | 25–15 | 25–23 | | | 75–53 |

=== Pool B ===
| Pos | Team | Pld | W | L | Pts | SW | SL | SR | SPW | SPL | SPR | Qualification |
|---|---|---|---|---|---|---|---|---|---|---|---|---|
| 1 | Peru | 3 | 3 | 0 | 6 | 9 | 1 | 9.000 | 342 | 247 | 1.385 | Semifinals |
| 2 | Colombia | 3 | 2 | 1 | 5 | 7 | 4 | 1.750 | 333 | 320 | 1.041 | Semifinals |
| 3 | Venezuela | 3 | 1 | 2 | 4 | 4 | 6 | 0.667 | 209 | 237 | 0.882 | |
| 4 | Chile | 3 | 0 | 3 | 3 | 0 | 9 | 0.000 | 150 | 230 | 0.652 | |

| Date | | Score | | Set 1 | Set 2 | Set 3 | Set 4 | Set 5 | Total |
|---|---|---|---|---|---|---|---|---|---|
| 30 Sep | Venezuela | 1–3 | Colombia | 10–25 | 29–27 | 23–25 | 23–25 | | 85–102 |
| 30 Sep | Peru | 3–0 | Chile | 25–16 | 25–13 | 25–18 | | | 75–47 |
| 1 Oct | Venezuela | 3–0 | Chile | 25–19 | 25–13 | 30–28 | | | 80–60 |
| 1 Oct | Peru | 3–1 | Colombia | 21–25 | 25–20 | 25–20 | 25–13 | | 96–78 |
| 2 Oct | Colombia | 3–0 | Chile | 25–19 | 25–9 | 25–15 | | | 75–43 |
| 2 Oct | Peru | 3–0 | Venezuela | 25–19 | 25–11 | 25–14 | | | 75–44 |

== Final round ==
Semifinals
2009-10-03 - Porto Alegre
Peru | 1
Argentina | 3
2009-10-03 - Porto Alegre
Brazil | 3
Colombia | 0

Final
2009-10-04 - Porto Alegre
Argentina | 0
Brazil | 3
3rd place
2009-10-04 - Porto Alegre
Peru | 3
Colombia | 1

=== Semifinals ===
| Date | | Score | | Set 1 | Set 2 | Set 3 | Set 4 | Set 5 | Total |
|---|---|---|---|---|---|---|---|---|---|
| 3 Oct | Brazil | 3–0 | Colombia | 25–16 | 25–14 | 25–6 | | | 75–36 |
| 3 Oct | Peru | 1–3 | Argentina | 25–17 | 23–25 | 19–25 | 21–25 | | 88–92 |

=== Seventh place ===
| Date | | Score | | Set 1 | Set 2 | Set 3 | Set 4 | Set 5 | Total |
|---|---|---|---|---|---|---|---|---|---|
| 3 Oct | Paraguay | 0–3 | Chile | 19–25 | 15–25 | 22–25 | | | 56–75 |

=== Fifth place ===
| Date | | Score | | Set 1 | Set 2 | Set 3 | Set 4 | Set 5 | Total |
|---|---|---|---|---|---|---|---|---|---|
| 3 Oct | Uruguay | 3–2 | Venezuela | 24–26 | 27–29 | 25–16 | 34–32 | 15–8 | 125–111 |

=== Third place ===
| Date | | Score | | Set 1 | Set 2 | Set 3 | Set 4 | Set 5 | Total |
|---|---|---|---|---|---|---|---|---|---|
| 4 Oct | Colombia | 1–3 | Peru | 11–25 | 21–25 | 25–21 | 14–25 | | 71–96 |

=== First place ===
| Date | | Score | | Set 1 | Set 2 | Set 3 | Set 4 | Set 5 | Total |
|---|---|---|---|---|---|---|---|---|---|
| 4 Oct | Brazil | 3–0 | Argentina | 25–16 | 25–16 | 25–22 | | | 75–54 |

== Final standing ==
| Rank | Team |
|---|---|
| 1st place, gold medalist(s) | Brazil |
| 2nd place, silver medalist(s) | Argentina |
| 3rd place, bronze medalist(s) | Peru |
| 4 | Colombia |
| 5 | Uruguay |
| 6 | Venezuela |
| 7 | Chile |
| 8 | Paraguay |

| Qualified for the 2009 World Grand Champions Cup |

2009 Women's South American champions

Brazil
16th title

Team Roster
Danielle Lins, Sheilla Castro, Caroline Gattaz, Adenizia da Silva, Marianne Steinbrecher, Natália Pereira, Fabiana de Oliveira, Paula Pequeno, Joyce Silva, Welissa Gonzaga, Ana Tiemi Takagui, Camila Brait
Head coach
José Roberto Guimarães

== Individual awards ==
- Most valuable player
  - Fabiana de Oliveira (BRA)
- Best spiker
  - Leyla Chihuán (PER)
- Best blocker
  - Caroline Gattaz (BRA)
- Best server
  - Yael Castiglione (ARG)
- Best digger
  - Marianela Robinet (ARG)
- Best setter
  - Danielle Lins (BRA)
- Best receiver
  - Fabiana de Oliveira (BRA)
- Best libero
  - Marianela Robinet (ARG)
