= Paula Parisi =

Argentine volleyball player (born 1967)

Personal information
- Nationality: Argentine
- Born: 15 September 1967 (age 59)
- Height: 177 cm (70 in)
- Weight: 68 kg (150 lb)
- Spike: 305 cm (120 in)
- Block: 283 cm (111 in)

Volleyball information
- Number: 7 (national team)

Career
Years	Teams
2003	GELP, ARG

National team
2003	Argentina

Paula Parisi (born 15 September 1967) is a retired Argentine female volleyball player. She was part of the Argentina women's national volleyball team.

She participated in the 2003 FIVB Volleyball World Grand Prix. On club level she played for GELP, ARG in 2003.
