= 2008 Women's Pan-American Volleyball Cup =

Tournament details
- Host country: Mexico
- Dates: May 30 – June 7, 2008
- Teams: 12
- Venue(s): Auditorio del Estado, Gimnasio de Usos Múltiples (in Mexicali and Tijuana host cities)

Final positions
- Champions: Dominican Republic (1st title)

Tournament awards
- MVP: (Dominican Republic) Sidarka Núñez

The 2008 Women's Pan-American Volleyball Cup was the seventh edition of the annual women's volleyball tournament, played by twelve countries from May 30 to June 7, 2008, in Mexicali and Tijuana, Mexico. The intercontinental event served as a qualifier for the 2009 FIVB World Grand Prix in Tokyo, Japan.

== Competing nations ==
Group A — Tijuana	Group B — Mexicali
Argentina; Costa Rica; Dominican Republic; Mexico; Trinidad and Tobago; United States	Brazil; Cuba; Canada; Peru; Puerto Rico; Venezuela

== Preliminary round ==
=== Group A ===
	Team	Points	G	W	L	PW	PL	Ratio	SW	SL	Ratio
1	Dominican Republic	9	5	4	1	428	329	1.301	13	5	2.600
2	United States	9	5	4	1	408	317	1.287	14	3	4.667
3	Argentina	9	5	4	1	377	306	1.232	12	4	3.000
4	Mexico	7	5	2	3	349	399	0.875	6	12	0.500
5	Costa Rica	6	5	1	4	316	393	0.804	5	12	0.417
6	Trinidad and Tobago	5	5	0	5	261	395	0.661	1	15	0.067

- Friday May 30, 2008

Argentina	3–0	Trinidad and Tobago	25–13, 25–17, 25–16
United States	2–3	Dominican R.	25–20, 18–25, 27–25, 23–25, 8–15
Mexico	3–2	Costa Rica	25–19, 21–25, 23–25, 25–19, 15–10

- Saturday May 31, 2008

Costa Rica	0–3	United States	20–25, 10–25, 25–27
Dominican R.	3–0	Trinidad and Tobago	25–12, 25–17, 25–17
Argentina	3–0	Mexico	25–16, 25–18, 25–16

- Sunday June 1, 2008

Costa Rica	0–3	Dominican R.	15–25, 17–25, 19–25
United States	3–0	Argentina	25–16, 25–18, 30–28
Mexico	3–1	Trinidad and Tobago	25–23, 25–14, 20–25, 25–14

- Monday June 2, 2008

Trinidad and Tobago	0–3	Costa Rica	21–25, 15–25, 21–25
Dominican R.	1–3	Argentina	25–15, 23–25, 23–25, 22–25
United States	3–0	Mexico	25–18, 25–22, 25–14

- Tuesday June 3, 2008

Trinidad and Tobago	0–3	United States	11–25, 11–25, 14–25
Costa Rica	0–3	Argentina	15–25, 7–25, 15–25
Mexico	0–3	Dominican R.	19–25, 15–25, 7–25

=== Group B ===
	Team	Points	G	W	L	PW	PL	Ratio	SW	SL	Ratio
1	Brazil	10	5	5	0	398	264	1.508	15	1	15.000
2	Canada	9	5	4	1	420	387	1.085	13	6	2.167
3	Puerto Rico	8	5	3	2	373	353	1.057	10	7	1.429
4	Peru	7	5	2	3	344	382	0.901	6	11	0.545
5	Venezuela	6	5	1	4	342	398	0.859	5	12	0.417
6	Cuba	5	5	0	5	336	429	0.783	3	15	0.200

- Friday May 30, 2008

Venezuela	0–3	Brazil	11–25, 21–25, 19–25
Peru	0–3	Puerto Rico	20–25, 17–25, 21–25
Cuba	2–3	Canada	25–20, 19–25, 25–21, 12–25, 15–17

- Saturday May 31, 2008

Venezuela	2–3	Peru	25–22, 19–25, 23–25, 25–20, 11–15
Puerto Rico	3–1	Cuba	20–25, 25–16, 25–16, 25–16
Brazil	3–1	Canada	25–14, 23–25, 25–13, 25–13

- Sunday June 1, 2008

Canada	3–0	Venezuela	25–20, 25–21, 25–22
Puerto Rico	0–3	Brazil	20–25, 14–25, 14–25
Cuba	0–3	Peru	24–26, 14–25, 16–25

- Monday June 2, 2008

Venezuela	3–0	Cuba	25–23, 25–20, 25–22
Canada	3–1	Puerto Rico	25–16, 25–19, 22–25, 25–20
Brazil	3–0	Peru	25–11, 25–20, 25–22

- Tuesday June 3, 2008

Puerto Rico	3–0	Venezuela	25–17, 25–21, 25–12
Peru	0–3	Canada	20–25, 12–25, 18–25
Cuba	0–3	Brazil	20–25, 11–25, 16–25

== Final round ==
Semi-finals
2008-06-06 – Mexicali, Mexico
Brazil	3
Argentina	0
2008-06-06 – Mexicali, Mexico
Dominican Republic	3
Puerto Rico	1

Final
2008-06-07 – Mexicali, Mexico
Brazil	2
Dominican Republic	3
3rd place
2008-06-07 – Mexicali, Mexico
Argentina	3
Puerto Rico	1

=== Classification 11–12 ===
- Thursday June 5, 2008

Trinidad and Tobago	0–3	Cuba	14–25, 12–25, 14–25

=== Classification 1/8 Finals ===
- Thursday June 5, 2008

Costa Rica	0–3	Peru	15–25, 19–25, 13–25
Mexico	1–3	Venezuela	27–25, 16–25, 19–25, 19–25

=== Quarterfinals ===
- Thursday June 5, 2008

Argentina	3–2	Canada	22–25, 26–24, 25–14, 21–25, 15–13
United States	1–3	Puerto Rico	21–25, 32–34, 25–14, 18–25

=== Classification 9–10 ===
- Friday June 6, 2008

Costa Rica	3–1	Mexico	31–29, 18–25, 25–19, 25–23

=== Classification 5–8 ===
- Friday June 6, 2008

Peru	0–3	United States	19–25, 15–25, 16–25
Venezuela	3–2	Canada	25–17, 16–25, 25–17, 14–25, 15–9

=== Semifinals ===
- Friday June 6, 2008

Brazil	3–0	Argentina	25–14 25–15 25–23
Dominican Republic	3–1	Puerto Rico	18–25 25–19 25–22 25–17

=== Classification 7–8, 5–6 ===
- Saturday June 7, 2008

Peru	3–2	Canada	26–24 25–12 23–25 18–25 15–6
United States	3–2	Venezuela	27–25 28–26 17–25 22–25 15–7

=== Finals ===
- Saturday June 7, 2008

Argentina	3–1	Puerto Rico	26–24 25–18 16–25 25–18
Brazil	2–3	Dominican Republic	24–26 28–30 25–22 25–19 11–15

== Final ranking ==
Place	Team
1.	Dominican Republic
2.	Brazil
3.	Argentina
4.	Puerto Rico
5.	United States
6.	Venezuela
7.	Peru
8.	Canada
9.	Costa Rica
10.	Mexico
11.	Cuba
12.	Trinidad and Tobago

2008 Women's Pan-American Cup winners

Dominican Republic
First title

- Dominican Republic, Brazil, Puerto Rico and the United States qualified for the 2009 World Grand Prix

== Individual awards ==
- Most valuable player
  - Sidarka Núñez (DOM)
- Best scorer
  - Desiree Glod (VEN)
- Best spiker
  - Alexis Crimes (USA)
- Best blocker
  - Cindy Rondón (DOM)
- Best server
  - Patricia Soto (PER)
- Best digger
  - Camila Brait (BRA)
- Best setter
  - Angela McGinnis (USA)
- Best receiver
  - Marianela Robinet (ARG)
- Best libero
  - Marianela Robinet (ARG)
- Rising Star
  - Brenda Castillo (DOM)
