= 2011 FIVB Volleyball World Grand Prix =

Worldwide women's volleyball tournament

2011 FIVB World Grand Prix

Tournament details
- Host country: Macau (Final)
- Dates: 5–28 August
- Teams: 16
- Venue: 1 (in 1 host city)

Final positions
- Champions: United States (4th title)
- Runners-up: Brazil
- Third place: Serbia
- Fourth place: Russia

Tournament awards
- MVP: Destinee Hooker (USA)

The 2011 FIVB World Grand Prix was a women's volleyball tournament played by 16 countries from 5 to 28 August 2011. The finals were held at the Macau East Asian Games Dome in Macau, China.

The United States won the tournament, after defeating 3–0 to Brazil in the gold medal match. Destinee Hooker of the United States won the MVP award.

== Competing nations ==
The following national teams qualified:

Europe	Americas	Asia
Poland; Serbia; Italy; Germany; Russia	Brazil; Peru; United States; Cuba; Argentina; Dominican Republic	China; Japan; South Korea; Kazakhstan; Thailand

== Pool standing procedure ==
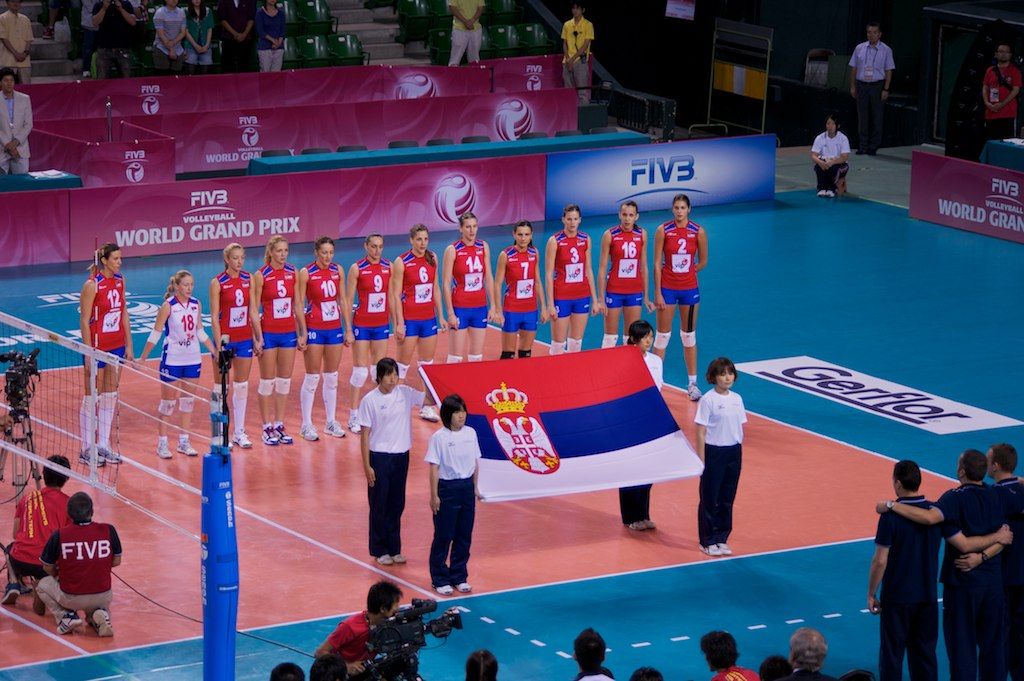
Serbia at 2011 FIVB Volleyball World Grand Prix won the Bronze medal

1. Match points
2. Numbers of matches won
3. Sets ratio
4. Points ratio

Match won 3–0 or 3–1: 3 match points for the winner, 0 match points for the loser
Match won 3–2: 2 match points for the winner, 1 match point for the loser

== Calendar ==
Week 1 5–7 August 2011
Group A: Bydgoszcz, Poland	Group B: Nakhon Pathom, Thailand	Group C: Busan, South Korea	Group D: Luohe, China
Poland; Italy; Dominican Republic; Argentina	Thailand; Cuba; Peru; Russia	South Korea; Brazil; Japan; Germany	China; United States; Serbia; Kazakhstan
Week 2 12–14 August 2011
Group E: Zielona Góra, Poland	Group F: Almaty, Kazakhstan	Group G: Quanzhou, China	Group H: Komaki, Japan
Poland; Cuba; South Korea; Argentina	Kazakhstan; Italy; Brazil; Thailand	China; Russia; Germany; Peru	Japan; United States; Serbia; Dominican Republic
Week 3 19–21 August 2011
Group I: Hong Kong	Group J: Hong Kong	Group K: Bangkok, Thailand	Group L: Tokyo, Japan
China; Poland; Dominican Republic; Kazakhstan	United States; Italy; Germany; Peru	Thailand; Cuba; Brazil; Argentina	Japan; Russia; Serbia; South Korea
Week 4 Final Round 24–28 August 2011
Macau

== Preliminary round ==
=== Ranking ===
The host China and top seven teams in the preliminary round advanced to the final round.

Pos	Team	Pld	W	L	Pts	SPW	SPL	SPR	SW	SL	SR	Qualification
1	Brazil	9	9	0	27	722	514	1.405	27	2	13.500	Final round
2	United States	9	8	1	23	708	559	1.267	25	5	5.000	Final round
3	Russia	9	7	2	21	751	626	1.200	23	9	2.556	Final round
4	Serbia	9	6	3	20	762	700	1.089	23	11	2.091	Final round
5	Italy	9	7	2	19	804	718	1.120	22	13	1.692	Final round
6	Japan	9	6	3	18	664	645	1.029	18	11	1.636	Final round
7	China	9	6	3	17	702	669	1.049	19	12	1.583	Hosts for the Final round
8	Thailand	9	5	4	15	695	693	1.003	17	15	1.133	Final round
9	South Korea	9	5	4	13	708	732	0.967	15	17	0.882	
10	Poland	9	4	5	13	733	727	1.008	16	16	1.000	
11	Cuba	9	2	7	9	748	814	0.919	15	21	0.714	
12	Dominican Republic	9	3	6	8	767	829	0.925	13	23	0.565	
13	Germany	9	2	7	7	670	729	0.919	10	22	0.455	
14	Argentina	9	2	7	4	622	752	0.827	7	25	0.280	
15	Kazakhstan	9	0	9	2	613	757	0.810	5	27	0.185	
16	Peru	9	0	9	0	482	696	0.693	1	27	0.037	

=== First round ===
==== Pool A ====
Date		Score		Set 1	Set 2	Set 3	Set 4	Set 5	Total	Report
5 Aug	Poland	3–0	Argentina	25–20	25–17	25–22			75–59	P2 P3
5 Aug	Italy	3–1	Dominican Republic	25–18	22–25	25–18	25–17		97–78	P2 P3
6 Aug	Poland	2–3	Dominican Republic	25–21	17–25	24–26	25–23	16–18	107–113	P2 P3
6 Aug	Italy	3–1	Argentina	25–17	23–25	25–20	25–18		98–80	P2 P3
7 Aug	Poland	1–3	Italy	12–25	25–21	24–26	14–25		75–97	P2 P3
7 Aug	Dominican Republic	2–3	Argentina	25–20	22–25	19–25	25–23	11–15	102–108	P2 P3

==== Pool B ====
Date		Score		Set 1	Set 2	Set 3	Set 4	Set 5	Total	Report
5 Aug	Russia	3–1	Cuba	24–26	25–18	25–23	25–20		99–87	P2 P3
5 Aug	Thailand	3–0	Peru	25–20	25–13	25–16			75–49	P2 P3
6 Aug	Peru	0–3	Russia	12–25	9–25	14–25			35–75	P2 P3
6 Aug	Cuba	2–3	Thailand	25–23	25–17	26–28	23–25	10–15	109–108	P2 P3
7 Aug	Peru	0–3	Cuba	24–26	19–25	22–25			65–76	P2 P3
7 Aug	Russia	3–0	Thailand	25–18	25–19	27–25			77–62	P2 P3

==== Pool C ====
Date		Score		Set 1	Set 2	Set 3	Set 4	Set 5	Total	Report
5 Aug	Brazil	3–0	Japan	25–18	25–16	25–21			75–55	P2 P3
5 Aug	South Korea	3–1	Germany	25–19	25–19	20–25	25–20		95–83	P2 P3
6 Aug	South Korea	0–3	Japan	20–25	21–25	22–25			63–75	P2 P3
6 Aug	Brazil	3–1	Germany	25–21	23–25	25–15	25–23		98–84	P2 P3
7 Aug	South Korea	0–3	Brazil	17–25	20–25	22–25			59–75	P2 P3
7 Aug	Japan	3–0	Germany	25–22	25–13	25–19			75–54	P2 P3

==== Pool D ====
Date		Score		Set 1	Set 2	Set 3	Set 4	Set 5	Total	Report
5 Aug	Serbia	2–3	United States	22–25	19–25	25–23	25–20	10–15	101–108	P2 P3
5 Aug	China	3–0	Kazakhstan	25–18	25–23	25–16			75–57	P2 P3
6 Aug	Kazakhstan	0–3	United States	15–25	21–25	12–25			48–75	P2 P3
6 Aug	China	1–3	Serbia	21–25	25–23	21–25	18–25		85–98	P2 P3
7 Aug	China	0–3	United States	20–25	17–25	16–25			53–75	P2 P3
7 Aug	Serbia	3–0	Kazakhstan	25–19	25–15	25–22			75–56	P2 P3

=== Second round ===
==== Pool E ====
Date		Score		Set 1	Set 2	Set 3	Set 4	Set 5	Total	Report
12 Aug	Poland	3–0	Argentina	25–20	25–20	25–23			75–63	P2 P3
12 Aug	Cuba	2–3	South Korea	25–17	16–25	17–25	25–23	12–15	95–105	P2 P3
13 Aug	Poland	0–3	South Korea	21–25	32–34	23–25			76–84	P2 P3
13 Aug	Cuba	2–3	Argentina	19–25	25–15	25–20	18–25	14–16	101–101	P2 P3
14 Aug	Poland	3–1	Cuba	25–15	25–21	23–25	25–20		98–81	P2 P3
14 Aug	South Korea	3–0	Argentina	25–22	25–16	25–21			75–59	P2 P3

==== Pool F ====
Date		Score		Set 1	Set 2	Set 3	Set 4	Set 5	Total	Report
12 Aug	Kazakhstan	2–3	Italy	25–22	25–22	18–25	19–25	12–15	99–109	P2 P3
12 Aug	Thailand	0–3	Brazil	16–25	23–25	16–25			55–75	P2 P3
13 Aug	Brazil	3–0	Kazakhstan	25–14	25–18	25–20			75–52	P2 P3
13 Aug	Italy	3–2	Thailand	24–26	19–25	25–22	25–15	15–12	108–100	P2 P3
14 Aug	Kazakhstan	0–3	Thailand	24–26	23–25	21–25			68–76	P2 P3
14 Aug	Italy	1–3	Brazil	23–25	26–24	18–25	18–25		85–99	P2 P3

==== Pool G ====
Date		Score		Set 1	Set 2	Set 3	Set 4	Set 5	Total	Report
12 Aug	Germany	0–3	Russia	18–25	19–25	21–25			58–75	P2 P3
12 Aug	China	3–0	Peru	25–16	25–20	25–13			75–49	P2 P3
13 Aug	Peru	0–3	Russia	20–25	17–25	17–25			54–75	P2 P3
13 Aug	China	3–2	Germany	14–25	22–25	25–23	25–21	18–16	104–110	P2 P3
14 Aug	Peru	0–3	Germany	23–25	15–25	18–25			56–75	P2 P3
14 Aug	China	0–3	Russia	22–25	23–25	20–25			65–75	P2 P3

==== Pool H ====
Date		Score		Set 1	Set 2	Set 3	Set 4	Set 5	Total	Report
12 Aug	United States	3–0	Dominican Republic	25–22	25–22	25–10			75–54	P2 P3
12 Aug	Japan	3–1	Serbia	25–16	25–21	17–25	25–21		92–83	P2 P3
13 Aug	Serbia	3–0	Dominican Republic	25–17	25–20	25–22			75–59	P2 P3
13 Aug	Japan	0–3	United States	22–25	14–25	18–25			54–75	P2 P3
14 Aug	Japan	3–1	Dominican Republic	25–22	26–24	23–25	25–20		99–91	P2 P3
14 Aug	United States	1–3	Serbia	12–25	25–17	23–25	15–25		75–92	P2 P3

=== Third round ===
==== Pool I ====
Date		Score		Set 1	Set 2	Set 3	Set 4	Set 5	Total	Report
19 Aug	Kazakhstan	0–3	Poland	20–25	12–25	20–25			52–75	P2 P3
19 Aug	China	3–0	Dominican Republic	26–24	25–22	25–18			76–64	P2 P3
20 Aug	Dominican Republic	3–1	Poland	24–26	28–26	26–24	25–17		103–93	P2 P3
20 Aug	China	3–1	Kazakhstan	25–16	19–25	25–20	25–21		94–82	P2 P3
21 Aug	Dominican Republic	3–2	Kazakhstan	15–25	27–25	21–25	25–15	15–9	103–99	P2 P3
21 Aug	China	3–0	Poland	25–20	25–17	25–22			75–59	P2 P3

==== Pool J ====
Date		Score		Set 1	Set 2	Set 3	Set 4	Set 5	Total	Report
19 Aug	Italy	3–0	Peru	25–18	25–16	25–18			75–52	P2 P3
19 Aug	United States	3–0	Germany	25–10	25–18	25–23			75–51	P2 P3
20 Aug	Germany	3–1	Peru	25–14	20–25	25–19	25–18		95–76	P2 P3
20 Aug	United States	3–0	Italy	25–23	25–19	25–18			75–60	P2 P3
21 Aug	United States	3–0	Peru	25–13	25–18	25–15			75–46	P2 P3
21 Aug	Germany	0–3	Italy	15–25	22–25	23–25			60–75	P2 P3

==== Pool K ====
Date		Score		Set 1	Set 2	Set 3	Set 4	Set 5	Total	Report
19 Aug	Cuba	0–3	Brazil	18–25	13–25	12–25			43–75	P2 P3
19 Aug	Thailand	3–0	Argentina	25–23	25–15	25–14			75–52	P2 P3
20 Aug	Brazil	3–0	Argentina	25–12	25–15	25–8			75–35	P2 P3
20 Aug	Cuba	1–3	Thailand	25–23	21–25	21–25	13–25		80–98	P2 P3
21 Aug	Argentina	0–3	Cuba	24–26	23–25	18–25			65–76	P2 P3
21 Aug	Brazil	3–0	Thailand	25–16	25–12	25–18			75–46	P2 P3

==== Pool L ====
Date		Score		Set 1	Set 2	Set 3	Set 4	Set 5	Total	Report
19 Aug	Russia	2–3	South Korea	22–25	25–17	25–20	23–25	11–15	106–102	P2 P3
19 Aug	Japan	0–3	Serbia	20–25	22–25	18–25			60–75	P2 P3
20 Aug	Russia	3–2	Serbia	25–13	21–25	21–25	25–17	15–8	108–88	P2 P3
20 Aug	Japan	3–0	South Korea	25–19	25–22	29–27			79–68	P2 P3
21 Aug	Serbia	3–0	South Korea	25–18	25–16	25–23			75–57	P2 P3
21 Aug	Japan	3–0	Russia	25–23	25–19	25–19			75–61	P2 P3

== Final round ==
The finals took place 24–28 August at the Macau East Asian Games Dome in Macau, China.

=== Pool A ===
Pos	Team	Pld	W	L	Pts	SW	SL	SR	SPW	SPL	SPR	Qualification
1	Serbia	3	3	0	8	9	3	3.000	281	252	1.115	Semifinals
2	Russia	3	2	1	6	7	4	1.750	259	234	1.107	Semifinals
3	Thailand	3	1	2	3	4	7	0.571	246	250	0.984	5th place match
4	China	3	0	3	1	3	9	0.333	230	280	0.821	7th place match

Date		Score		Set 1	Set 2	Set 3	Set 4	Set 5	Total	Report
24 Aug	Thailand	1–3	Russia	18–25	22–25	27–25	17–25		84–100	P2 P3
24 Aug	China	2–3	Serbia	25–20	18–25	25–23	16–25	16–18	100–111	P2 P3
25 Aug	Russia	1–3	Serbia	25–20	17–25	21–25	21–25		84–95	P2 P3
25 Aug	China	1–3	Thailand	12–25	21–25	25–19	17–25		75–94	P2 P3
26 Aug	Serbia	3–0	Thailand	25–23	25–22	25–23			75–68	P2 P3
26 Aug	China	0–3	Russia	21–25	11–25	23–25			55–75	P2 P3

=== Pool B ===
Pos	Team	Pld	W	L	Pts	SW	SL	SR	SPW	SPL	SPR	Qualification
1	Brazil	3	3	0	9	9	1	9.000	248	200	1.240	Semifinals
2	United States	3	2	1	5	7	5	1.400	273	261	1.046	Semifinals
3	Japan	3	1	2	3	3	6	0.500	197	215	0.916	5th place match
4	Italy	3	0	3	1	2	9	0.222	216	258	0.837	7th place match

Date		Score		Set 1	Set 2	Set 3	Set 4	Set 5	Total	Report
24 Aug	Japan	0–3	United States	22–25	17–25	23–25			62–75	P2 P3
24 Aug	Brazil	3–0	Italy	25–16	25–17	25–17			75–50	P2 P3
25 Aug	United States	3–2	Italy	25–19	21–25	22–25	25–22	15–10	108–101	P2 P3
25 Aug	Brazil	3–0	Japan	25–17	25–22	25–21			75–60	P2 P3
26 Aug	Italy	0–3	Japan	23–25	23–25	19–25			65–75	P2 P3
26 Aug	Brazil	3–1	United States	22–25	26–24	25–21	25–20		98–90	P2 P3

=== 7th place match ===
Date		Score		Set 1	Set 2	Set 3	Set 4	Set 5	Total	Report
27 Aug	China	2–3	Italy	13–25	25–14	25–22	16–25	10–15	89–101	P2 P3

=== 5th place match ===
Date		Score		Set 1	Set 2	Set 3	Set 4	Set 5	Total	Report
27 Aug	Thailand	0–3	Japan	14–25	23–25	23–25			60–75	P2 P3

=== Semifinals ===
Date		Score		Set 1	Set 2	Set 3	Set 4	Set 5	Total	Report
27 Aug	Serbia	0–3	United States	22–25	20–25	21–25			63–75	P2 P3
27 Aug	Brazil	3–0	Russia	26–24	25–17	25–23			76–64	P2 P3

=== Bronze medal match ===
Date		Score		Set 1	Set 2	Set 3	Set 4	Set 5	Total	Report
28 Aug	Serbia	3–0	Russia	25–21	25–20	25–16			75–57	P2 P3

=== Final ===
Date		Score		Set 1	Set 2	Set 3	Set 4	Set 5	Total	Report
28 Aug	United States	3–0	Brazil	26–24	25–20	25–21			76–65	P2 P3

== Final standing ==
Rank	Team
1st place, gold medalist(s)	United States
2nd place, silver medalist(s)	Brazil
3rd place, bronze medalist(s)	Serbia
4	Russia
5	Japan
6	Thailand
7	Italy
8	China
9	South Korea
10	Poland
11	Cuba
12	Dominican Republic
13	Germany
14	Argentina
15	Kazakhstan
16	Peru

2011 FIVB World Grand Prix winners

United States
Fourth title

Team roster:
Kimberly Glass, Alisha Glass, Nicole Davis, Heather Bown, Lindsey Berg, Jennifer Tamas, Jordan Larson, Logan Tom, Foluke Akinradewo, Nancy Metcalf, Megan Hodge, Destinee Hooker, Tamari Miyashiro.
Head coach: Hugh McCutcheon

== Individual awards ==
- Most valuable player:
  - Destinee Hooker (USA)
- Best spiker:
  - Milena Rašić (SRB)
- Best blocker:
  - Iuliia Morozova (RUS)
- Best server:
  - Thaísa Menezes (BRA)
- Best receiver:
  - Fernanda Garay (BRA)
- Best libero:
  - Victoria Kuzyakina (RUS)
- Best setter:
  - Danielle Lins (BRA)
- Best scorer:
  - Jovana Brakočević (SRB)
- Best digger:
  - Fabiana de Oliveira (BRA)
