= 2013 Women's Pan-American Volleyball Cup =

Tournament details
- Host country: Peru
- Dates: 10–16 June
- Teams: 12
- Venues: 4 (in Lima, Callao, Iquitos, Huacho host cities)

Final positions
- Champions: United States (3rd title)

Tournament awards
- MVP: Nicole Fawcett (USA)

The 2013 Pan-American Volleyball Cup was the twelfth edition of the annual women's volleyball tournament, played by twelve countries over June, 2013 in Lima, Callao, Iquitos, Huacho, in Peru. Team USA defeated 3–0 to the Dominican Republic in the gold medal match, Argentina took the bronze over Brazil. Puerto Rico and Cuba joined the previous four teams, qualifying to the 2014 FIVB World Grand Prix.

== Competing nations ==
Group A	Group B	Group C
Argentina; Puerto Rico; United States; Trinidad and Tobago	Cuba; Canada; Peru; Costa Rica	Colombia; Mexico; Brazil; Dominican Republic

== Pool standing procedure ==
Match won 3–0: 5 points for the winner, 0 point for the loser
Match won 3–1: 4 points for the winner, 1 points for the loser
Match won 3–2: 3 points for the winner, 2 points for the loser
In case of tie, the teams were classified according to the following criteria:
points ratio and sets ratio

=== Group A ===
Pos	Team	Pld	W	L	Pts	SPW	SPL	SPR	SW	SL	SR	Qualification
1	United States	3	3	0	13	266	195	1.364	9	2	4.500	Semifinals
2	Argentina	3	2	1	10	208	186	1.118	6	3	2.000	Quarterfinals
3	Puerto Rico	3	1	2	7	233	240	0.971	5	6	0.833	
4	Trinidad and Tobago	2	0	2	0	139	225	0.618	0	6	0.000	

Date	Time		Score		Set 1	Set 2	Set 3	Set 4	Set 5	Total	Report
10 June	18:00	Argentina	3–0	Puerto Rico	25–23	25–21	25–15			75–59	P2P3
10 June	20:00	United States	3–0	Trinidad and Tobago	25–13	25–12	25–13			75–38	P2P3
11 June	18:00	Trinidad and Tobago	0–3	Argentina	23–25	18–25	11–25			52–75	P2P3
11 June	20:00	Puerto Rico	2–3	United States	30–28	25–23	14–25	17–25	13–15	99–116	P2P3
12 June	18:00	Puerto Rico	3–0	Trinidad and Tobago	25–19	25–18	25–12			75–49	P2P3
12 June	20:00	United States	3–0	Argentina	25–17	25–19	25–22			75–58	P2P3

=== Group B ===
Pos	Team	Pld	W	L	Pts	SPW	SPL	SPR	SW	SL	SR	Qualification
1	Cuba	3	3	0	11	285	260	1.096	9	4	2.250	Quarterfinals
2	Canada	3	2	1	10	286	266	1.075	8	5	1.600	Quarterfinals
3	Peru	3	1	2	9	280	264	1.061	7	6	1.167	
4	Costa Rica	3	0	3	0	164	225	0.729	0	9	0.000	

Date	Time		Score		Set 1	Set 2	Set 3	Set 4	Set 5	Total	Report
10 June	18:00	Cuba	3–2	Canada	21–25	20–25	25–21	25–20	15–13	106–104	P2P3
10 June	20:00	Peru	3–0	Costa Rica	25–19	25–18	15–16			65–53	P2P3
11 June	18:00	Costa Rica	0–3	Cuba	20–25	14–25	17–25			51–75	P2P3
11 June	20:00	Peru	2–3	Canada	19–25	25–22	20–25	25–20	11–15	100–107	P2P3
12 June	18:00	Canada	3–0	Costa Rica	25–18	25–23	25–19			75–60	P2P3
12 June	20:00	Cuba	3–2	Peru	19–25	25–21	20–25	25–22	15–12	104–105	P2P3

=== Group C ===
Pos	Team	Pld	W	L	Pts	SPW	SPL	SPR	SW	SL	SR	Qualification
1	Dominican Republic	3	3	0	14	256	201	1.274	9	1	9.000	Semifinals
2	Brazil	3	2	1	10	272	235	1.157	7	4	1.750	Quarterfinals
3	Mexico	3	1	2	6	200	230	0.870	4	6	0.667	
4	Colombia	3	0	3	0	163	225	0.724	0	9	0.000	

Date	Time		Score		Set 1	Set 2	Set 3	Set 4	Set 5	Total	Report
10 June	18:00	Colombia	0–3	Mexico	18–25	23–25	16–25			57–75	P2P3
10 June	20:00	Brazil	1–3	Dominican Republic	25–21	20–25	21–25	33–35		99–106	P2P3
11 June	18:00	Dominican Republic	3–0	Colombia	25–19	25–14	25–21			75–54	P2P3
11 June	20:00	Mexico	1–3	Brazil	25–23	16–25	21–25	15–25		77–98	P2P3
12 June	18:00	Dominican Republic	3–0	Mexico	25–17	25–13	25–18			75–48	P2P3
12 June	20:00	Brazil	3–0	Colombia	25–11	25–23	25–18			75–52	P2P3

== Final round ==
=== Championship bracket ===
Quarterfinals
B2	Canada	2
C2	Brazil	3
B1	Cuba	0
A2	Argentina	3

Semifinals
A1	United States	3
C2	Brazil	0
C1	Dominican Republic	3
A2	Argentina	0

Finals
A1	United States	3
C1	Dominican Republic	0
Third place
C2	Brazil	0
A2	Argentina	3

=== 5th and 8th places bracket ===
Classification 7–10
B3	Peru	3
C3	Mexico	2
A3	Puerto Rico	3
B4	Costa Rica	0

Classification 5–8
B1	Cuba	3
B3	Peru	1
B2	Canada	1
A3	Puerto Rico	3

Classification 5–6
B1	Cuba	2
A3	Puerto Rico	3
Classification 7–8
B3	Peru	0
B2	Canada	3

=== 9th and 12th places bracket ===
Classification 9–12
A4	Trinidad and Tobago	3
C3	Mexico	0
C4	Colombia	3
B4	Costa Rica	2

Classification 9–10
A4	Trinidad and Tobago	2
C4	Colombia	3
Classification 11–12
C3	Mexico	1
B4	Costa Rica	3

=== Classification 7–10 ===
Date	Time		Score		Set 1	Set 2	Set 3	Set 4	Set 5	Total	Report
14 June	19:00	Peru	3–2	Mexico	20–25	26–28	25–20	25–17	16–14	112–104	P2P3
14 June	18:00	Puerto Rico	3–0	Costa Rica	25–5	25–14	25–12			75–31	P2P3

=== Quarterfinals ===
Date	Time		Score		Set 1	Set 2	Set 3	Set 4	Set 5	Total	Report
14 June	20:00	Canada	2–3	Brazil	20–25	25–23	13–25	25–20	9–15	92–108	P2P3
14 June	17:00	Cuba	0–3	Argentina	24–26	22–25	23–25			69–76	P2P3

=== Classification 9–12 ===
Date	Time		Score		Set 1	Set 2	Set 3	Set 4	Set 5	Total	Report
15 June	16:00	Trinidad and Tobago	3–0	Mexico	25–17	25–22	26–24			76–63	P2P3
15 June	18:00	Colombia	3–2	Costa Rica	35–33	15–25	20–25	25–22	15–6	110–111	P2P3

=== Classification 5–8 ===
Date	Time		Score		Set 1	Set 2	Set 3	Set 4	Set 5	Total	Report
15 June	18:00	Peru	1–3	Cuba	25–18	16–25	15–25	16–25		72–93	P2P3
15 June	20:00	Puerto Rico	3–1	Canada	27–25	18–25	25–17	25–19		95–86	P2P3

=== Semifinals ===
Date	Time		Score		Set 1	Set 2	Set 3	Set 4	Set 5	Total	Report
15 June	20:00	United States	3–0	Brazil	25–11	25–20	25–22			75–53	P2P3
15 June	16:00	Dominican Republic	3–0	Argentina	25–18	25–18	25–11			75–47	P2P3

=== 11th place match ===
Date	Time		Score		Set 1	Set 2	Set 3	Set 4	Set 5	Total	Report
16 June	12:00	Mexico	1–3	Costa Rica	25–27	25–23	22–25	21–25		93–100	P2P3

=== 9th place match ===
Date	Time		Score		Set 1	Set 2	Set 3	Set 4	Set 5	Total	Report
16 June	14:00	Trinidad and Tobago	2–3	Colombia	25–19	25–13	18–25	14–25	13–15	95–97	P2P3

=== 7th place match ===
Date	Time		Score		Set 1	Set 2	Set 3	Set 4	Set 5	Total	Report
16 June	16:00	Peru	0–3	Canada	21–25	14–25	19–25			54–75	P2P3

=== 5th place match ===
Date	Time		Score		Set 1	Set 2	Set 3	Set 4	Set 5	Total	Report
16 June	17:00	Cuba	2–3	Puerto Rico	26–24	25–18	18–25	22–25	9–15	100–107	P2P3

=== Bronze medal match ===
Date	Time		Score		Set 1	Set 2	Set 3	Set 4	Set 5	Total	Report
15 June	15:00	Brazil	0–3	Argentina	23–25	22–25	15–25			60–75	P2P3

=== Gold medal match ===
Date	Time		Score		Set 1	Set 2	Set 3	Set 4	Set 5	Total	Report
16 June	19:00	United States	3–0	Dominican Republic	25–12	25–20	25–18			75–50	P2P3

== Final standing ==
Rank	Team
1st place, gold medalist(s)	United States
2nd place, silver medalist(s)	Dominican Republic
3rd place, bronze medalist(s)	Argentina
4	Brazil
5	Puerto Rico
6	Cuba
7	Canada
8	Peru
9	Colombia
10	Trinidad and Tobago
11	Costa Rica
12	Mexico

Qualified for the 2014 World Grand Prix

== Individual awards ==
- Most valuable player
  (United States) Nicole Fawcett
- Best scorer
  (Mexico) Samantha Bricio
- Best spiker
  (United States) Megan Hodge
- Best blocker
  (Canada) Jaimie Thibeault
- Best server
  (United States) Nicole Fawcett
- Best digger
  (Argentina) Lucia Gaido
- Best setter
  (Argentina) Yael Castiglione
- Best receiver
  (United States) Kayla Banwarth
- Best libero
  (Argentina) Lucia Gaido
