= 2011 FIVB Volleyball Women's World Cup =

Women's world cups 2011

2011 Women's World Cup
Tournament details
- Host country: Japan
- Dates: 4–18 November
- Teams: 12
- Venues: 7 (in 6 host cities)

Final positions
- Champions: Italy (2nd title)
- Runners-up: United States
- Third place: China

Tournament awards
- MVP: (Italy) Carolina Costagrande

The 2011 FIVB Women's World Cup was played from 4 to 18 November 2011 in Japan. The tournament was the first step in the qualification process for the 2012 Summer Olympics in London, United Kingdom. The top three teams qualified for the Olympics, and joined Great Britain as they had already secured a berth as the host country.

== Qualification ==
12 teams participated in the World Cup:

- The host nation's team.
- The five champions of their respective continental championships in 2011.
- Four highest-ranked second-place teams of their respective continental championships in 2011 (according to the FIVB World Ranking as of January 15, 2011).
- Two wild cards chosen from among the participants of the continental championships in 2011.

| Competition | Date | Venue | Qualified |
|---|---|---|---|
| Host country | — | — | Japan |
| 2011 African Championship | August 17–24, 2011 | (Kenya) Nairobi | Kenya; Algeria |
| 2011 NORCECA Championship | September 12–17, 2011 | (Puerto Rico) Caguas | United States; Dominican Republic |
| 2011 Asian Championship | September 15–23, 2011 | (Chinese Taipei) Taipei | China; South Korea |
| 2011 European Championship | Sep. 24 – Oct. 2, 2011 | Serbia; Italy | Serbia; Germany |
| 2011 South American Championship | Sep. 28 – Oct. 2, 2011 | (Peru) Callao | Brazil |
| Wild card | October 5, 2011 | (Japan) Tokyo | Italy; Argentina |
| Total | | | 12 |

FIVB World Ranking for second-place teams (as of January 15, 2011)

| Rank | Team | Continent |
|---|---|---|
| 10 | Germany | Europe |
| 13 | Dominican Republic | NORCECA |
| 15 | Algeria | Africa |
| 18 | South Korea | Asia |
| 25 | Argentina | South America |

== Venues ==
| Round | Site A | Site B |
|---|---|---|
| 1st | Hiroshima Sun Plaza, Hiroshima | White Ring, Nagano |
| 2nd | Hiroshima Sun Plaza, Hiroshima | Toyama City Gymnasium, Toyama |
| 3rd | Hokkaido Prefectural Sports Center, Sapporo | Momotaro Arena, Okayama |
| 4th | Yoyogi National Gymnasium, Tokyo | Tokyo Metropolitan Gymnasium, Tokyo |

== Format ==
The competition system of the 2011 World Cup for Women is the single Round-Robin system. Each team played once against each of the 11 remaining teams. Points were accumulated during the whole tournament, and the final ranking was determined by the total points gained.

The teams were divided into 2 groups of 6 teams each.
Rounds 1 + 2 (30 matches, 5 days): Teams played against teams in the same group
Rounds 3 + 4 (36 matches, 6 days): Teams played against teams in the other group

== Pool standing procedure ==
1. Match points
2. Numbers of matches won
3. Sets ratio
4. Points ratio

Match won 3–0 or 3–1: 3 match points for the winner, 0 match points for the loser
Match won 3–2: 2 match points for the winner, 1 match point for the loser

== Results ==
| Pos | Team | Pld | W | L | Pts | SW | SL | SR | SPW | SPL | SPR |
|---|---|---|---|---|---|---|---|---|---|---|---|
| 1 | Italy | 11 | 10 | 1 | 28 | 31 | 8 | 3.875 | 931 | 721 | 1.291 |
| 2 | United States | 11 | 9 | 2 | 26 | 27 | 10 | 2.700 | 892 | 726 | 1.229 |
| 3 | China | 11 | 8 | 3 | 26 | 30 | 13 | 2.308 | 997 | 821 | 1.214 |
| 4 | Japan | 11 | 8 | 3 | 24 | 27 | 11 | 2.455 | 889 | 739 | 1.203 |
| 5 | Brazil | 11 | 8 | 3 | 21 | 25 | 16 | 1.563 | 941 | 808 | 1.165 |
| 6 | Germany | 11 | 6 | 5 | 20 | 25 | 17 | 1.471 | 944 | 871 | 1.084 |
| 7 | Serbia | 11 | 5 | 6 | 18 | 22 | 19 | 1.158 | 926 | 877 | 1.056 |
| 8 | Dominican Republic | 11 | 5 | 6 | 12 | 17 | 25 | 0.680 | 861 | 927 | 0.929 |
| 9 | South Korea | 11 | 3 | 8 | 11 | 13 | 24 | 0.542 | 709 | 838 | 0.846 |
| 10 | Argentina | 11 | 3 | 8 | 9 | 9 | 26 | 0.346 | 686 | 809 | 0.848 |
| 11 | Algeria | 11 | 1 | 10 | 3 | 4 | 31 | 0.129 | 544 | 854 | 0.637 |
| 12 | Kenya | 11 | 0 | 11 | 0 | 3 | 33 | 0.091 | 561 | 890 | 0.630 |

=== First round ===
==== Site A ====
| Date | Time | | Score | | Set 1 | Set 2 | Set 3 | Set 4 | Set 5 | Total | Report |
|---|---|---|---|---|---|---|---|---|---|---|---|
| 4 Nov | 11:00 | China | 3–0 | Algeria | 25–13 | 25–14 | 25–19 | | | 75–46 | P2 P3 |
| 4 Nov | 14:30 | Dominican Republic | 1–3 | Argentina | 25–18 | 17–25 | 18–25 | 22–25 | | 82–93 | P2 P3 |
| 4 Nov | 18:20 | Italy | 3–1 | Japan | 25–20 | 23–25 | 25–18 | 25–15 | | 98–78 | P2 P3 |
| 5 Nov | 11:00 | Algeria | 0–3 | Dominican Republic | 7–25 | 15–25 | 20–25 | | | 42–75 | P2 P3 |
| 5 Nov | 15:00 | Italy | 3–2 | China | 25–20 | 22–25 | 21–25 | 25–21 | 15–12 | 108–103 | P2 P3 |
| 5 Nov | 18:20 | Japan | 3–0 | Argentina | 25–19 | 25–11 | 25–20 | | | 75–50 | P2 P3 |
| 6 Nov | 11:00 | Dominican Republic | 0–3 | Italy | 26–28 | 13–25 | 12–25 | | | 51–78 | P2 P3 |
| 6 Nov | 15:00 | Argentina | 3–1 | Algeria | 25–18 | 25–12 | 20–25 | 25–16 | | 95–71 | P2 P3 |
| 6 Nov | 18:20 | China | 3–2 | Japan | 20–25 | 25–19 | 20–25 | 25–23 | 15–13 | 105–105 | P2 P3 |

==== Site B ====
| Date | Time | | Score | | Set 1 | Set 2 | Set 3 | Set 4 | Set 5 | Total | Report |
|---|---|---|---|---|---|---|---|---|---|---|---|
| 4 Nov | 11:00 | Serbia | 3–0 | South Korea | 27–25 | 25–22 | 25–22 | | | 77–69 | P2 P3 |
| 4 Nov | 14:30 | Kenya | 0–3 | Germany | 19–25 | 14–25 | 8–25 | | | 41–75 | P2 P3 |
| 4 Nov | 18:20 | United States | 3–1 | Brazil | 25–22 | 17–25 | 27–25 | 25–19 | | 94–91 | P2 P3 |
| 5 Nov | 11:00 | South Korea | 0–3 | Germany | 20–25 | 16–25 | 15–25 | | | 51–75 | P2 P3 |
| 5 Nov | 15:00 | Serbia | 0–3 | United States | 16–25 | 25–27 | 20–25 | | | 61–77 | P2 P3 |
| 5 Nov | 18:20 | Brazil | 3–0 | Kenya | 25–15 | 25–16 | 25–9 | | | 75–40 | P2 P3 |
| 6 Nov | 11:00 | Kenya | 1–3 | Serbia | 25–19 | 22–25 | 11–25 | 11–25 | | 69–94 | P2 P3 |
| 6 Nov | 15:00 | Germany | 1–3 | Brazil | 21–25 | 25–23 | 23–25 | 21–25 | | 90–98 | P2 P3 |
| 6 Nov | 18:20 | United States | 3–0 | South Korea | 25–10 | 25–12 | 25–13 | | | 75–35 | P2 P3 |

=== Second round ===
==== Site A ====
| Date | Time | | Score | | Set 1 | Set 2 | Set 3 | Set 4 | Set 5 | Total | Report |
|---|---|---|---|---|---|---|---|---|---|---|---|
| 8 Nov | 11:00 | China | 3–1 | Dominican Republic | 23–25 | 25–13 | 25–19 | 25–18 | | 98–75 | P2 P3 |
| 8 Nov | 15:00 | Italy | 3–0 | Argentina | 25–19 | 25–10 | 25–19 | | | 75–48 | P2 P3 |
| 8 Nov | 18:20 | Japan | 3–0 | Algeria | 25–8 | 25–10 | 25–17 | | | 75–35 | P2 P3 |
| 9 Nov | 11:00 | Argentina | 0–3 | China | 10–25 | 18–25 | 23–25 | | | 51–75 | P2 P3 |
| 9 Nov | 15:00 | Algeria | 0–3 | Italy | 14–25 | 14–25 | 15–25 | | | 43–75 | P2 P3 |
| 9 Nov | 18:20 | Dominican Republic | 0–3 | Japan | 20–25 | 19–25 | 16–25 | | | 55–75 | P2 P3 |

==== Site B ====
| Date | Time | | Score | | Set 1 | Set 2 | Set 3 | Set 4 | Set 5 | Total | Report |
|---|---|---|---|---|---|---|---|---|---|---|---|
| 8 Nov | 11:00 | United States | 3–0 | Kenya | 25–16 | 25–13 | 25–21 | | | 75–50 | P2 P3 |
| 8 Nov | 15:00 | South Korea | 2–3 | Brazil | 25–22 | 18–25 | 25–18 | 13–25 | 8–15 | 89–105 | P2 P3 |
| 8 Nov | 18:20 | Serbia | 2–3 | Germany | 22–25 | 26–24 | 23–25 | 25–23 | 11–15 | 107–112 | P2 P3 |
| 9 Nov | 11:00 | Kenya | 0–3 | South Korea | 21–25 | 15–25 | 14–25 | | | 50–75 | P2 P3 |
| 9 Nov | 15:00 | Brazil | 3–2 | Serbia | 21–25 | 21–25 | 25–18 | 25–19 | 15–12 | 107–99 | P2 P3 |
| 9 Nov | 18:20 | Germany | 3–0 | United States | 32–30 | 25–19 | 26–24 | | | 83–73 | P2 P3 |

=== Third round ===
==== Site A ====
| Date | Time | | Score | | Set 1 | Set 2 | Set 3 | Set 4 | Set 5 | Total | Report |
|---|---|---|---|---|---|---|---|---|---|---|---|
| 11 Nov | 11:00 | Italy | 3–0 | South Korea | 25–15 | 25–12 | 25–17 | | | 75–44 | P2 P3 |
| 11 Nov | 15:00 | China | 2–3 | Brazil | 23–25 | 27–25 | 25–21 | 20–25 | 15–17 | 110–113 | P2 P3 |
| 11 Nov | 19:20 | Japan | 0–3 | Serbia | 22–25 | 20–25 | 21–25 | | | 63–75 | P2 P3 |
| 12 Nov | 11:00 | Italy | 3–0 | Brazil | 25–23 | 25–16 | 25–22 | | | 75–61 | P2 P3 |
| 12 Nov | 15:00 | China | 3–1 | Serbia | 21–25 | 25–19 | 25–23 | 25–23 | | 96–90 | P2 P3 |
| 12 Nov | 18:20 | Japan | 3–0 | South Korea | 25–21 | 25–18 | 25–17 | | | 75–56 | P2 P3 |
| 13 Nov | 11:00 | Italy | 3–0 | Serbia | 29–27 | 25–19 | 25–20 | | | 79–66 | P2 P3 |
| 13 Nov | 15:00 | China | 3–0 | South Korea | 25–12 | 25–8 | 25–16 | | | 75–36 | P2 P3 |
| 13 Nov | 18:20 | Japan | 3–0 | Brazil | 26–24 | 25–19 | 25–23 | | | 76–66 | P2 P3 |

==== Site B ====
| Date | Time | | Score | | Set 1 | Set 2 | Set 3 | Set 4 | Set 5 | Total | Report |
|---|---|---|---|---|---|---|---|---|---|---|---|
| 11 Nov | 11:00 | Dominican Republic | 3–1 | Kenya | 25–18 | 25–14 | 26–28 | 25–19 | | 101–79 | P2 P3 |
| 11 Nov | 15:00 | Algeria | 0–3 | Germany | 10–25 | 8–25 | 19–25 | | | 37–75 | P2 P3 |
| 11 Nov | 18:20 | Argentina | 0–3 | United States | 12–25 | 15–25 | 19–25 | | | 46–75 | P2 P3 |
| 12 Nov | 11:00 | Dominican Republic | 3–2 | Germany | 30–28 | 22–25 | 25–14 | 18–25 | 15–12 | 110–104 | P2 P3 |
| 12 Nov | 15:00 | Argentina | 3–0 | Kenya | 26–24 | 25–13 | 25–16 | | | 76–53 | P2 P3 |
| 12 Nov | 18:20 | Algeria | 0–3 | United States | 12–25 | 12–25 | 9–25 | | | 33–75 | P2 P3 |
| 13 Nov | 11:00 | Argentina | 0–3 | Germany | 22–25 | 17–25 | 18–25 | | | 57–75 | P2 P3 |
| 13 Nov | 15:00 | Algeria | 3–1 | Kenya | 19–25 | 25–20 | 25–16 | 25–23 | | 94–84 | P2 P3 |
| 13 Nov | 18:20 | Dominican Republic | 0–3 | United States | 21–25 | 19–25 | 14–25 | | | 54–75 | P2 P3 |

=== Fourth round ===
==== Site A ====
| Date | Time | | Score | | Set 1 | Set 2 | Set 3 | Set 4 | Set 5 | Total | Report |
|---|---|---|---|---|---|---|---|---|---|---|---|
| 16 Nov | 11:00 | China | 2–3 | United States | 21–25 | 29–31 | 25–18 | 25–19 | 10–15 | 110–108 | P2 P3 |
| 16 Nov | 15:00 | Italy | 3–2 | Germany | 22–25 | 22–25 | 25–21 | 25–13 | 15–13 | 109–97 | P2 P3 |
| 16 Nov | 18:20 | Japan | 3–0 | Kenya | 25–11 | 25–10 | 25–9 | | | 75–30 | P2 P3 |
| 17 Nov | 11:00 | China | 3–0 | Kenya | 25–7 | 25–15 | 25–10 | | | 75–32 | P2 P3 |
| 17 Nov | 15:00 | Italy | 1–3 | United States | 23–25 | 15–25 | 25–22 | 21–25 | | 84–97 | P2 P3 |
| 17 Nov | 18:20 | Japan | 3–2 | Germany | 25–20 | 23–25 | 25–27 | 25–17 | 15–12 | 113–101 | P2 P3 |
| 18 Nov | 11:00 | Italy | 3–0 | Kenya | 25–6 | 25–10 | 25–17 | | | 75–33 | P2 P3 |
| 18 Nov | 15:00 | China | 3–0 | Germany | 25–18 | 25–18 | 25–21 | | | 75–57 | P2 P3 |
| 18 Nov | 18:20 | Japan | 3–0 | United States | 29–27 | 25–23 | 25–18 | | | 79–68 | P2 P3 |

==== Site B ====
| Date | Time | | Score | | Set 1 | Set 2 | Set 3 | Set 4 | Set 5 | Total | Report |
|---|---|---|---|---|---|---|---|---|---|---|---|
| 16 Nov | 11:00 | Dominican Republic | 3–2 | Serbia | 14–25 | 19–25 | 25–23 | 25–22 | 15–12 | 98–107 | P2 P3 |
| 16 Nov | 15:00 | Algeria | 0–3 | South Korea | 17–25 | 21–25 | 15–25 | | | 53–75 | P2 P3 |
| 16 Nov | 18:20 | Argentina | 0–3 | Brazil | 20–25 | 19–25 | 9–25 | | | 48–75 | P2 P3 |
| 17 Nov | 11:00 | Dominican Republic | 3–2 | South Korea | 25–19 | 25–17 | 26–28 | 21–25 | 15–12 | 112–101 | P2 P3 |
| 17 Nov | 15:00 | Algeria | 0–3 | Brazil | 18–25 | 8–25 | 13–25 | | | 39–75 | P2 P3 |
| 17 Nov | 18:20 | Argentina | 0–3 | Serbia | 15–25 | 18–25 | 23–25 | | | 56–75 | P2 P3 |
| 18 Nov | 11:00 | Algeria | 0–3 | Serbia | 19–25 | 14–25 | 18–25 | | | 51–75 | P2 P3 |
| 18 Nov | 14:00 | Dominican Republic | 0–3 | Brazil | 21–25 | 10–25 | 17–25 | | | 48–75 | P2 P3 |
| 18 Nov | 17:00 | Argentina | 0–3 | South Korea | 17–25 | 26–28 | 23–25 | | | 66–78 | P2 P3 |

== Final standing ==
| Rank | Team |
|---|---|
| 1st place, gold medalist(s) | Italy |
| 2nd place, silver medalist(s) | United States |
| 3rd place, bronze medalist(s) | China |
| 4 | Japan |
| 5 | Brazil |
| 6 | Germany |
| 7 | Serbia |
| 8 | Dominican Republic |
| 9 | South Korea |
| 10 | Argentina |
| 11 | Algeria |
| 12 | Kenya |

| Qualified for the 2012 Summer Olympics |

2011 Women's World Cup champions

Italy
2nd title

== Awards ==
- Most Valuable Player
  (Italy) Carolina Costagrande
- Best scorer
  (Dominican Republic) Bethania de la Cruz
- Best spiker
  (United States) Destinee Hooker
- Best blocker
  (Germany) Christiane Furst
- Best server
  (Dominican Republic) Bethania de la Cruz
- Best digger
  (Japan) Yuko Sano
- Best setter
  (Japan) Yoshie Takeshita
- Best receiver
  (Brazil) Fabiana de Oliveira
- Best libero
  (South Korea) Nam Jie-youn
