= 2014 FIVB Volleyball World Grand Prix =

International women's volleyball tournament

2014 World Grand Prix
Tournament details
- Host country: Japan (Group 1 Final)
- Dates: 25 July – 24 August
- Teams: 28
- Venues: 20 (in 20 host cities)

Final positions
- Champions: Brazil (10th title)

Tournament awards
- MVP: Yuko Sano (JPN)

The 2014 FIVB Volleyball World Grand Prix was the 22nd edition of the annual women's international volleyball tournament played by 28 countries from 25 July to 24 August 2014. The Group 1 final round was held in Tokyo, Japan. The Brazilian star team won the tournament for the tenth time, their second consecutive victory.

== Qualification ==
- No qualification tournament.
- 28 teams were invited.

=== Qualified teams ===
Africa	Asia and Oceania	Europe	North, Central America and Caribbean	South America
Algeria; Kenya	Australia; China; Japan; Kazakhstan; South Korea; Thailand	Belgium; Bulgaria; Croatia; Czech Republic; Germany; Italy Netherlands; Poland; Russia; Serbia; Turkey	Canada; Cuba; Dominican Republic; Mexico; Puerto Rico; United States	Argentina; Brazil; Peru

== Format ==
- This was the first time the World Grand Prix featured 28 teams.
- During the Intercontinental Round, Pools A to O would play matches in three stand-alone tournaments, for a total of nine matches per team. Pool P to S eould feature two stand-alone tournaments, for a total of six matches per team.
- Six teams would qualify for the World Grand Prix Finals featuring the top four teams from all matches, plus the winner of the Final Four of Group 2 and the hosts (if the hosts are one of the top four teams, then the fifth top team would also participate).
- The last ranked team of Group 1 after the Intercontinental Round could be relegated if the winner of the Final Four of Group 2 met the promotion requirements set by the FIVB.

== Pools composition ==
The pools composition was announced on 1 December 2014.

Group 1			Group 2		Group 3	
Week 2			Week 1			
Pool A Turkey	Pool B South Korea	Pool C Italy	Pool J Peru	Pool K Puerto Rico	Pool P Kazakhstan	Pool Q Mexico
United States; Japan; Turkey; Russia	Germany; Thailand; Serbia; South Korea	China; Italy; Dominican Rep; Brazil	Canada; Poland; Belgium; Peru	Cuba; Puerto Rico; Netherlands; Argentina	Kazakhstan; Australia; Czech Republic; Croatia	Kenya; Algeria; Bulgaria; Mexico
Week 3			Week 2			
Pool D Brazil	Pool E Turkey	Pool F Hong Kong	Pool L Belgium	Pool M Peru	Pool R Czech Republic	Pool S Croatia
United States; Brazil; South Korea; Russia	Germany; Turkey; Serbia; Dominican Rep	China; Italy; Thailand; Japan	Canada; Netherlands; Belgium; Argentina	Cuba; Poland; Puerto Rico; Peru	Kazakhstan; Algeria; Czech Republic; Mexico	Kenya; Australia; Bulgaria; Croatia
Week 4			Week3		Final round	
Pool G Thailand	Pool H Russia	Pool I Macau	Pool N Argentina	Pool O Netherlands	Group 1 (Week 6) Japan	
United States; Thailand; Dominican Rep; Brazil	Germany; Italy; Turkey; Russia	China; Japan; Serbia; South Korea	Canada; Cuba; Argentina; Peru	Netherlands; Poland; Belgium; Puerto Rico	Japan; Brazil; China Turkey; Russia; Belgium	

== Intercontinental round ==
- All times are local.

=== Group 1 ===
==== Ranking ====
Pos	Team	Pld	W	L	Pts	SW	SL	SR	SPW	SPL	SPR	Qualification
1	Brazil	9	9	0	26	27	3	9.000	748	570	1.312	Qualified for the final round
2	China	9	5	4	17	21	15	1.400	829	773	1.072	Qualified for the final round
3	Turkey	9	6	3	16	22	17	1.294	883	868	1.017	Qualified for the final round
4	Russia	9	5	4	16	19	16	1.188	807	777	1.039	Qualified for the final round
5	United States	9	5	4	15	20	18	1.111	850	817	1.040	
6	Serbia	9	4	5	13	18	18	1.000	806	790	1.020	
7	Japan	9	4	5	13	17	20	0.850	784	831	0.943	Qualified as host country for the final round
8	South Korea	9	4	5	13	16	19	0.842	753	810	0.930	
9	Italy	9	5	4	12	18	18	1.000	769	780	0.986	
10	Germany	9	4	5	12	16	18	0.889	761	786	0.968	
11	Thailand	9	2	7	6	11	24	0.458	712	808	0.881	
12	Dominican Republic	9	1	8	3	7	26	0.269	689	781	0.882	

==== Week 1 ====
===== Pool A =====
- Venue: Baskent Volleyball Hall, Ankara, Turkey

Date	Time		Score		Set 1	Set 2	Set 3	Set 4	Set 5	Total	Report
1 Aug	16:00	United States	1–3	Russia	25–22	18–25	20–25	20–25		83–97	P2 P3
1 Aug	19:00	Turkey	3–0	Japan	29–27	25–19	25–21			79–67	P2 P3
2 Aug	16:00	Russia	3–1	Japan	25–23	25–13	24–26	25–18		99–80	P2 P3
2 Aug	19:00	Turkey	3–2	United States	25–21	27–29	25–21	20–25	15–12	112–108	P2 P3
3 Aug	16:00	Japan	2–3	United States	27–25	17–25	22–25	26–24	11–15	103–114	P2 P3
3 Aug	19:00	Turkey	3–2	Russia	25–23	29–27	14–25	18–25	15–10	101–110	P2 P3

===== Pool B =====
- Venue: Hwaseong Stadium, Hwaseong, South Korea

Date	Time		Score		Set 1	Set 2	Set 3	Set 4	Set 5	Total	Report
1 Aug	13:40	Serbia	3–0	Germany	26–24	25–20	25–15			76–59	P2 P3
1 Aug	16:10	South Korea	3–1	Thailand	23–25	25–22	25–16	25–20		98–83	P2 P3
2 Aug	14:10	South Korea	3–1	Germany	21–25	25–20	25–22	25–21		96–88	P2 P3
2 Aug	16:40	Serbia	2–3	Thailand	19–25	25–18	25–20	19–25	13–15	101–103	P2 P3
3 Aug	14:10	South Korea	1–3	Serbia	22–25	24–26	25–21	9–25		80–97	P2 P3
3 Aug	16:40	Thailand	0–3	Germany	21–25	22–25	21–25			64–75	P2 P3

===== Pool C =====
- Venue: PalaSerradimigni, Sassari, Italy

Date	Time		Score		Set 1	Set 2	Set 3	Set 4	Set 5	Total	Report
1 Aug	17:30	Brazil	3–1	China	25–21	23–25	25–17	25–16		98–79	P2 P3
1 Aug	20:10	Italy	3–0	Dominican Republic	25–18	25–23	25–15			75–56	P2 P3
2 Aug	17:40	China	3–0	Dominican Republic	25–18	25–21	25–23			75–62	P2 P3
2 Aug	20:00	Brazil	3–0	Italy	25–21	25–16	25–15			75–52	P2 P3
3 Aug	17:30	Dominican Republic	0–3	Brazil	24–26	19–25	18–25			61–76	P2 P3
3 Aug	20:10	Italy	3–2	China	25–18	18–25	25–22	18–25	15–10	101–100	P2 P3

==== Week 2 ====
===== Pool D =====
- Venue: Ibirapuera Gymnasium, São Paulo, Brazil

Date	Time		Score		Set 1	Set 2	Set 3	Set 4	Set 5	Total	Report
8 Aug	11:00	Russia	1–3	United States	25–22	19–25	18–25	17–25		79–97	P2 P3
8 Aug	14:45	Brazil	3–0	South Korea	25–16	25–12	25–15			75–43	P2 P3
9 Aug	10:00	Brazil	3–0	Russia	25–15	25–21	25–17			75–53	P2 P3
9 Aug	12:30	United States	3–0	South Korea	25–15	25–17	25–16			75–48	P2 P3
10 Aug	10:00	Brazil	3–0	United States	25–20	25–22	29–27			79–69	P2 P3
10 Aug	12:30	Russia	1–3	South Korea	25–21	21–25	25–27	22–25		93–98	P2 P3

===== Pool E =====
- Venue: Başkent Volleyball Hall, Ankara, Turkey

Date	Time		Score		Set 1	Set 2	Set 3	Set 4	Set 5	Total	Report
8 Aug	16:00	Serbia	0–3	Germany	21–25	28–30	18–25			67–80	P2 P3
8 Aug	19:00	Turkey	2–3	Dominican Republic	25–23	25–19	22–25	22–25	9–15	103–107	P2 P3
9 Aug	16:00	Germany	3–2	Dominican Republic	25–19	19–25	22–25	25–16	16–14	107–99	P2 P3
9 Aug	19:00	Turkey	3–2	Serbia	18–25	25–19	22–25	25–20	17–15	107–104	P2 P3
10 Aug	16:00	Dominican Republic	0–3	Serbia	21–25	22–25	25–27			68–77	P2 P3
10 Aug	19:00	Turkey	3–1	Germany	25–15	25–19	21–25	25–20		96–79	P2 P3

===== Pool F =====
- Venue: Hong Kong Coliseum, Hong Kong, China

Date	Time		Score		Set 1	Set 2	Set 3	Set 4	Set 5	Total	Report
8 Aug	18:30	Japan	2–3	Italy	20–25	17–25	25–21	25–20	11–15	98–106	P2 P3
8 Aug	20:30	China	3–1	Thailand	29–27	25–18	20–25	25–15		99–85	P2 P3
9 Aug	13:15	Italy	3–0	Thailand	25–19	25–21	25–23			75–63	P2 P3
9 Aug	15:45	China	3–0	Japan	25–16	25–14	25–22			75–52	P2 P3
10 Aug	13:15	Japan	3–1	Thailand	25–18	25–15	19–25	25–20		94–78	P2 P3
10 Aug	15:45	China	3–1	Italy	25–20	25–18	22–25	25–16		97–79	P2 P3

==== Week 3 ====
===== Pool G =====
- Venue: Indoor Stadium Huamark, Bangkok, Thailand

Date	Time		Score		Set 1	Set 2	Set 3	Set 4	Set 5	Total	Report
15 Aug	16:00	Thailand	3–1	Dominican Republic	25–17	25–23	20–25	25–22		95–87	P2 P3
15 Aug	18:30	Brazil	3–2	United States	29–31	22–25	25–22	25–19	15–9	116–106	P2 P3
16 Aug	14:00	Brazil	3–0	Dominican Republic	25–19	25–11	29–27			79–57	P2 P3
16 Aug	16:30	Thailand	2–3	United States	19–25	25–19	25–20	12–25	10–15	91–104	P2 P3
17 Aug	14:00	Dominican Republic	1–3	United States	21–25	25–15	19–25	27–29		92–94	P2 P3
17 Aug	16:30	Thailand	0–3	Brazil	15–25	18–25	17–25			50–75	P2 P3

===== Pool H =====
- Venue: DS Yantarny, Kaliningrad, Russia

Date	Time		Score		Set 1	Set 2	Set 3	Set 4	Set 5	Total	Report
15 Aug	16:40	Turkey	1–3	Germany	25–20	34–36	20–25	22–25		101–106	P2 P3
15 Aug	19:10	Russia	3–1	Italy	25–27	25–19	25–19	25–18		100–83	P2 P3
16 Aug	16:40	Italy	3–2	Germany	22–25	21–25	25–18	25–14	15–12	108–94	P2 P3
16 Aug	19:10	Russia	3–1	Turkey	28–26	19–25	25–21	25–15		97–87	P2 P3
17 Aug	16:40	Italy	1–3	Turkey	23–25	19–25	25–22	23–25		90–97	P2 P3
17 Aug	19:10	Germany	0–3	Russia	25–27	24–26	24–26			73–79	P2 P3

===== Pool I =====
- Venue: Macau Forum, Macau, China

Date	Time		Score		Set 1	Set 2	Set 3	Set 4	Set 5	Total	Report
15 Aug	17:00	Japan	3–1	Serbia	25–17	10–25	25–17	25–19		85–78	P2 P3
15 Aug	20:30	China	3–1	South Korea	24–26	25–18	25–22	25–19		99–85	P2 P3
16 Aug	14:30	Japan	3–2	South Korea	22–25	25–21	20–25	27–25	15–13	109–109	P2 P3
16 Aug	17:00	China	2–3	Serbia	26–24	26–28	25–21	20–25	15–17	112–115	P2 P3
17 Aug	13:00	South Korea	3–1	Serbia	20–25	25–23	25–19	26–24		96–91	P2 P3
17 Aug	15:30	China	1–3	Japan	20–25	22–25	25–18	26–28		93–96	P2 P3

=== Group 2 ===
==== Ranking ====
Pos	Team	Pld	W	L	Pts	SW	SL	SR	SPW	SPL	SPR	Qualification or relegation
1	Netherlands	9	8	1	23	26	7	3.714	771	644	1.197	Qualified for the final four
2	Puerto Rico	9	7	2	19	21	12	1.750	756	695	1.088	Qualified for the final four
3	Belgium	9	6	3	19	21	9	2.333	714	629	1.135	Qualified for the final four
4	Poland	9	5	4	14	17	17	1.000	738	752	0.981	Qualified as host country for the final four
5	Argentina	9	4	5	13	14	18	0.778	718	715	1.004	
6	Peru	9	3	6	9	12	18	0.667	713	757	0.942	Relegated to Group 3
7	Canada	9	2	7	6	11	23	0.478	701	790	0.887	
8	Cuba	9	1	8	5	9	24	0.375	666	795	0.838	Relegated to Group 3

==== Week 1 ====
===== Pool J =====
- Venue: Coliseo Eduardo Dibos, Lima, Peru

Date	Time		Score		Set 1	Set 2	Set 3	Set 4	Set 5	Total	Report
25 Jul	16:40	Poland	3–1	Belgium	25–18	25–23	22–25	25–21		97–87	P2 P3
25 Jul	19:10	Peru	3–1	Canada	25–21	25–18	25–27	25–16		100–82	P2 P3
26 Jul	15:40	Poland	3–1	Canada	25–15	14–25	25–21	25–11		89–72	P2 P3
26 Jul	18:10	Peru	0–3	Belgium	21–25	14–25	19–25			54–75	P2 P3
27 Jul	15:40	Belgium	3–0	Canada	25–13	25–19	28–26			78–58	P2 P3
27 Jul	18:10	Peru	1–3	Poland	22–25	23–25	25–21	20–25		90–96	P2 P3

===== Pool K =====
- Venue: Coliseo Guillermo Angulo, Carolina, Puerto Rico

Date	Time		Score		Set 1	Set 2	Set 3	Set 4	Set 5	Total	Report
25 Jul	17:00	Netherlands	3–0	Cuba	25–11	25–13	25–20			75–44	P2 P3
25 Jul	20:00	Puerto Rico	3–0	Argentina	25–22	25–18	25–22			75–62	P2 P3
26 Jul	17:00	Cuba	1–3	Argentina	18–25	25–23	23–25	12–25		78–98	P2 P3
26 Jul	20:00	Puerto Rico	0–3	Netherlands	22–25	11–25	22–25			55–75	P2 P3
27 Jul	17:00	Argentina	0–3	Netherlands	19–25	19–25	24–26			62–76	P2 P3
27 Jul	20:00	Puerto Rico	3–0	Cuba	25–20	25–17	25–17			75–54	P2 P3

==== Week 2 ====
===== Pool L =====
- Venue: Sportoase Leuven, Leuven, Belgium

Date	Time		Score		Set 1	Set 2	Set 3	Set 4	Set 5	Total	Report
1 Aug	17:00	Netherlands	3–0	Argentina	25–20	25–18	25–12			75–50	P2 P3
1 Aug	20:00	Belgium	3–0	Canada	25–17	25–20	25–19			75–56	P2 P3
2 Aug	17:00	Argentina	2–3	Canada	25–23	25–22	24–26	22–25	13–15	109–111	P2 P3
2 Aug	20:00	Netherlands	3–2	Belgium	27–29	20–25	25–19	25–23	15–6	112–102	P2 P3
3 Aug	15:00	Canada	2–3	Netherlands	25–15	20–25	19–25	25–21	9–15	98–101	P2 P3
3 Aug	18:00	Argentina	0–3	Belgium	26–28	16–25	19–25			61–78	P2 P3

===== Pool M =====
- Venue: Coliseo Gran Chimú, Trujillo, Peru

Date	Time		Score		Set 1	Set 2	Set 3	Set 4	Set 5	Total	Report
1 Aug	16:40	Poland	3–0	Cuba	25–21	26–24	25–12			76–57	P2 P3
1 Aug	19:10	Peru	0–3	Puerto Rico	23–25	16–25	22–25			61–75	P2 P3
2 Aug	15:40	Poland	1–3	Puerto Rico	24–26	26–24	10–25	22–25		82–100	P2 P3
2 Aug	18:10	Peru	3–0	Cuba	25–20	25–21	25–17			75–58	P2 P3
3 Aug	15:40	Cuba	2–3	Puerto Rico	15–25	25–22	26–24	16–25	12–15	94–111	P2 P3
3 Aug	18:10	Peru	2–3	Poland	25–18	23–25	18–25	25–22	12–15	103–105	P2 P3

==== Week 3 ====
===== Pool N =====
- Venue: Microestadio Lomas de Zamora, Buenos Aires, Argentina

Date	Time		Score		Set 1	Set 2	Set 3	Set 4	Set 5	Total	Report
8 Aug	18:40	Canada	0–3	Cuba	25–27	18–25	22–25			65–77	P2 P3
8 Aug	21:10	Argentina	3–0	Peru	25–13	25–22	25–15			75–50	P2 P3
9 Aug	18:10	Cuba	2–3	Peru	25–27	30–28	23–25	25–22	13–15	116–117	P2 P3
9 Aug	20:40	Argentina	3–1	Canada	25–22	23–25	25–21	25–16		98–84	P2 P3
10 Aug	18:10	Peru	0–3	Canada	21–25	20–25	22–25			63–75	P2 P3
10 Aug	20:40	Argentina	3–1	Cuba	25–21	25–15	28–30	25–22		103–88	P2 P3

===== Pool O =====
- Venue: Topsport Centre Doetinchem, Doetinchem, Netherlands

Date	Time		Score		Set 1	Set 2	Set 3	Set 4	Set 5	Total	Report
8 Aug	16:00	Belgium	3–0	Poland	25–20	25–19	25–12			75–51	P2 P3
8 Aug	19:00	Netherlands	2–3	Puerto Rico	25–23	25–20	21–25	22–25	13–15	106–108	P2 P3
9 Aug	15:00	Puerto Rico	3–1	Poland	25–18	25–18	18–25	25–22		93–83	P2 P3
9 Aug	18:00	Netherlands	3–0	Belgium	25–22	26–24	25–20			76–66	P2 P3
10 Aug	15:00	Puerto Rico	0–3	Belgium	16–25	22–25	26–28			64–78	P2 P3
10 Aug	18:00	Poland	0–3	Netherlands	18–25	21–25	20–25			59–75	P2 P3

=== Group 3 ===
==== Ranking ====
Pos	Team	Pld	W	L	Pts	SW	SL	SR	SPW	SPL	SPR	Qualification
1	Czech Republic	6	6	0	18	18	2	9.000	502	373	1.346	Qualified for the final four
2	Bulgaria	6	6	0	16	18	7	2.571	597	494	1.209	Qualified as host country for the final four
3	Croatia	6	4	2	12	14	8	1.750	529	481	1.100	Qualified for the final four
4	Kazakhstan	6	3	3	9	11	9	1.222	455	426	1.068	Qualified for the final four
5	Kenya	6	3	3	9	12	12	1.000	503	516	0.975	
6	Mexico	6	2	4	6	8	13	0.615	452	495	0.913	
7	Australia	6	0	6	1	3	18	0.167	382	500	0.764	
8	Algeria	6	0	6	1	3	18	0.167	375	510	0.735	

==== Week 1 ====
===== Pool P =====
- Venue: Baluan Sports and Culture Palace, Almaty, Kazakhstan

Date	Time		Score		Set 1	Set 2	Set 3	Set 4	Set 5	Total	Report
25 Jul	15:00	Croatia	1–3	Czech Republic	30–32	21–25	25–19	20–25		96–101	P2P3
25 Jul	18:00	Kazakhstan	3–0	Australia	25–21	25–16	25–16			75–53	P2P3
26 Jul	15:00	Australia	0–3	Czech Republic	21–25	14–25	20–25			55–75	P2P3
26 Jul	18:00	Kazakhstan	1–3	Croatia	22–25	22–25	27–25	20–25		91–100	P2P3
27 Jul	15:00	Croatia	3–0	Australia	25–18	25–12	25–17			75–47	P2P3
27 Jul	18:00	Kazakhstan	1–3	Czech Republic	16–25	24–26	27–25	16–25		83–101	P2P3

===== Pool Q =====
- Venue: Olympic Gymnasium Juan de la Barrera, Mexico City, Mexico

Date	Time		Score		Set 1	Set 2	Set 3	Set 4	Set 5	Total	Report
25 Jul	17:00	Algeria	2–3	Bulgaria	15–25	25–22	18–25	25–23	17–19	100–114	P2P3
25 Jul	19:30	Mexico	1–3	Kenya	18–25	23–25	25–18	22–25		88–93	P2P3
26 Jul	15:30	Bulgaria	3–2	Kenya	25–19	23–25	26–24	24–26	15–12	113–106	P2P3
26 Jul	18:00	Mexico	3–0	Algeria	25–19	25–22	25–23			75–64	P2P3
27 Jul	14:00	Kenya	3–0	Algeria	25–14	25–18	25–13			75–45	P2P3
27 Jul	16:30	Mexico	1–3	Bulgaria	23–25	20–25	25–23	21–25		89–98	P2P3

==== Week 2 ====
===== Pool R =====
- Venue: City Hall Brno, Brno, Czech Republic

Date	Time		Score		Set 1	Set 2	Set 3	Set 4	Set 5	Total	Report
1 Aug	16:00	Mexico	0–3	Kazakhstan	18–25	16–25	19–25			53–75	P2P3
1 Aug	19:00	Czech Republic	3–0	Algeria	25–8	25–7	25–17			75–32	P2P3
2 Aug	16:00	Mexico	0–3	Czech Republic	14–25	18–25	19–25			51–75	P2P3
2 Aug	19:00	Kazakhstan	3–0	Algeria	25–8	25–19	25–17			75–44	P2P3
3 Aug	16:00	Algeria	1–3	Mexico	27–29	25–17	20–25	18–25		90–96	P2P3
3 Aug	19:00	Czech Republic	3–0	Kazakhstan	25–15	25–20	25–21			75–56	P2P3

===== Pool S =====
- Venue: Žatika Sport Centre, Poreč, Croatia

Date	Time		Score		Set 1	Set 2	Set 3	Set 4	Set 5	Total	Report
1 Aug	17:15	Australia	0–3	Bulgaria	14–25	19–25	13–25			46–75	P2P3
1 Aug	20:15	Croatia	3–0	Kenya	25–20	25–17	25–22			75–59	P2P3
2 Aug	17:15	Bulgaria	3–1	Kenya	21–25	25–8	25–20	25–11		96–64	P2P3
2 Aug	20:15	Australia	1–3	Croatia	18–25	25–20	23–25	16–25		82–95	P2P3
3 Aug	17:15	Kenya	3–2	Australia	25–17	18–25	25–21	22–25	15–11	105–99	P2P3
3 Aug	20:15	Croatia	1–3	Bulgaria	27–25	24–26	18–25	19–25		88–101	P2P3

== Final round ==
=== Group 3 ===
- Venue: Arena Samokov, Samokov, Bulgaria

Semifinals
16 Aug
Czech Republic	3
Croatia	2
16 Aug
Bulgaria	3
Kazakhstan	1

Final
17 Aug
Czech Republic	0
Bulgaria	3
3rd place match
17 Aug
Croatia	3
Kazakhstan	0

==== Semifinals ====
Date	Time		Score		Set 1	Set 2	Set 3	Set 4	Set 5	Total	Report
16 Aug	16:10	Czech Republic	3–2	Croatia	26–28	25–21	20–25	25–21	15–10	111–105	P2P3
16 Aug	19:10	Bulgaria	3–1	Kazakhstan	25–16	25–23	21–25	25–14		96–78	P2P3

==== 3rd place match ====
Date	Time		Score		Set 1	Set 2	Set 3	Set 4	Set 5	Total	Report
17 Aug	16:10	Croatia	3–0	Kazakhstan	25–20	25–22	25–17			75–59	P2P3

==== Final ====
Date	Time		Score		Set 1	Set 2	Set 3	Set 4	Set 5	Total	Report
17 Aug	19:10	Czech Republic	0–3	Bulgaria	16–25	13–25	17–25			46–75	P2P3

=== Group 2 ===
- Venue: Hala Widowwiskowo Sportowa, Koszalin, Poland

Semifinals
15 Aug
Poland	0
Belgium	3
15 Aug
Netherlands	3
Puerto Rico	1

Final
16 Aug
Belgium	3
Netherlands	2
3rd place match
16 Aug
Poland	0
Puerto Rico	3

==== Semifinals ====
Date	Time		Score		Set 1	Set 2	Set 3	Set 4	Set 5	Total	Report
15 Aug	17:30	Poland	0–3	Belgium	19–25	16–25	15–25			50–75	P2P3
15 Aug	20:15	Netherlands	3–1	Puerto Rico	22–25	31–29	25–20	25–12		103–86	P2P3

==== 3rd place match ====
Date	Time		Score		Set 1	Set 2	Set 3	Set 4	Set 5	Total	Report
16 Aug	17:30	Poland	0–3	Puerto Rico	19–25	17–25	22–25			58–75	P2P3

==== Final ====
Date	Time		Score		Set 1	Set 2	Set 3	Set 4	Set 5	Total	Report
16 Aug	20:15	Belgium	3–2	Netherlands	20–25	25–23	25–23	25–27	15–10	110–108	P2P3

=== Group 1 ===
==== Final Six ====
- Venue: Ariake Coliseum, Tokyo, Japan

Pos	Team	Pld	W	L	Pts	SW	SL	SR	SPW	SPL	SPR
1	Brazil	5	4	1	13	14	3	4.667	405	314	1.290
2	Japan	5	4	1	12	12	4	3.000	381	321	1.187
3	Russia	5	3	2	7	10	10	1.000	415	445	0.933
4	Turkey	5	2	3	7	10	12	0.833	475	483	0.983
5	China	5	2	3	6	8	12	0.667	439	443	0.991
6	Belgium	5	0	5	0	2	15	0.133	316	425	0.744

Date	Time		Score		Set 1	Set 2	Set 3	Set 4	Set 5	Total	Report
20 Aug	12:20	China	3–1	Belgium	25–19	25–27	25–18	25–15		100–79	100–79
20 Aug	15:00	Turkey	3–2	Brazil	25–18	25–23	21–25	19–25	15–12	105–103	105–103
20 Aug	19:05	Japan	3–1	Russia	22–25	25–20	25–21	25–17		97–83	97–83
21 Aug	12:20	Russia	3–0	Belgium	25–23	25–16	25–19			75–58	75–58
21 Aug	15:00	Brazil	3–0	China	25–23	25–20	25–21			75–64	75–64
21 Aug	19:05	Japan	3–0	Turkey	25–13	25–17	25–17			75–47	75–47
22 Aug	12:20	Turkey	2–3	Russia	22–25	24–26	25–13	27–25	12–15	110–104	110–104
22 Aug	15:00	Belgium	0–3	Brazil	10–25	12–25	12–25			34–75	34–75
22 Aug	19:05	China	0–3	Japan	21–25	17–25	21–25			59–75	59–75
23 Aug	12:20	Turkey	2–3	China	22–25	25–18	25–22	23–25	19–21	114–111	114–111
23 Aug	15:00	Russia	0–3	Brazil	12–25	21–25	20–25			53–75	53–75
23 Aug	19:05	Japan	3–0	Belgium	26–24	25–16	25–15			76–55	76–55
24 Aug	12:20	China	2–3	Russia	25–21	25–14	22–25	20–25	13–15	105–100	105–100
24 Aug	15:00	Belgium	1–3	Turkey	26–24	21–25	23–25	20–25		90–99	90–99
24 Aug	19:05	Brazil	3–0	Japan	25–15	25–18	27–25			77–58	77–58

== Final standing ==
Rank	Team
1st place, gold medalist(s)	Brazil
2nd place, silver medalist(s)	Japan
3rd place, bronze medalist(s)	Russia
4	Turkey
5	China
6	United States
7	Serbia
8	South Korea
9	Italy
10	Germany
11	Thailand
12	Dominican Republic
13	Belgium
14	Netherlands
15	Puerto Rico
16	Poland
17	Argentina
18	Peru
19	Canada
20	Cuba
21	Bulgaria
22	Czech Republic
23	Croatia
24	Kazakhstan
25	Kenya
26	Mexico
27	Australia
28	Algeria

2014 World Grand Prix champions

Brazil
10th title

14-woman roster for Group 1 final round
Fabiana Claudino (c), Dani Lins, Ana Carolina da Silva, Adenízia da Silva, Thaísa Menezes, Jaqueline Carvalho, Tandara Caixeta, Gabriela Guimarães, Sheilla Castro, Fernanda Garay, Monique Pavão, Fabíola de Souza, Camila Brait, Léia Silva,
Head coach
José Roberto Guimarães

== Awards ==
- Most Valuable Player
  (Japan) Yuko Sano
- Best Outside Hitters
  (China) Xiaotong Liu
  (Japan) Miyu Nagaoka
- Best Setter
  (Brazil) Danielle Lins
- Best Middle Blockers
  (Russia) Irina Fetisova
  (Brazil) Fabiana Claudino
- Best Libero
  (Japan) Yuko Sano
- Best Opposite
  (Brazil) Sheilla Castro
