= Volleyball at the 2013 Bolivarian Games – Men's tournament =

The men's tournament of volleyball at the 2013 Bolivarian Games in Trujillo, Peru was held between November 17 and November 21 at the Coliseo Gran Chimu.

This edition of the tournament, was the first with 6 teams instead of the usual 4. The defending champions were Venezuela. Chile won the gold medal for the first time.

== Teams ==
Men
- Bolivia
- Chile
- Colombia
- Ecuador
- Peru
- Venezuela

== Round-Robyn ==
This edition of the tournament will feature a sole Round-Robyn round with the top team being declared the champion. Matches were not seeded, instead the order of the matches were decided in a Draw at the technical meeting.

Pos	Team	Pld	W	L	Pts	SW	SL	SR	SPW	SPL	SPR
1	Chile	5	5	0	14	15	3	5.000	433	330	1.312
2	Venezuela	5	4	1	12	13	3	4.333	376	313	1.201
3	Colombia	5	3	2	10	11	9	1.222	447	416	1.075
4	Peru	5	2	3	6	7	10	0.700	380	373	1.019
5	Ecuador	5	1	4	3	5	12	0.417	328	413	0.794
6	Bolivia	5	0	5	0	1	12	0.083	274	393	0.697

=== Match results ===
Date		Score		Set 1	Set 2	Set 3	Set 4	Set 5	Total
17 Nov	Peru	0–3	Chile	23–25	22–25	16–25			61–75
17 Nov	Colombia	3–1	Ecuador	25–15	24–26	25–19	25–19		99–79
17 Nov	Venezuela	3–0	Bolivia	25–15	25–12	25–20			75–47
18 Nov	Peru	0–3	Venezuela	22–25	22–25	14–25			58–75
18 Nov	Colombia	3–1	Bolivia	25–20	25–10	18–25	25–11		93–66
18 Nov	Ecuador	0–3	Chile	14–25	21–25	16–25			51–75
19 Nov	Bolivia	0–3	Ecuador	21–25	18–25	23–25			62–75
19 Nov	Venezuela	1–3	Chile	25–21	16–25	18–25	17–25		76–96
19 Nov	Peru	1–3	Colombia	25–17	22–25	20–25	17–25		84–92
20 Nov	Venezuela	3–0	Ecuador	25–13	25–17	25–19			75–49
20 Nov	Peru	3–0	Bolivia	25–21	25–21	25–15			75–57
20 Nov	Colombia	2–3	Chile	26–24	25–23	16–25	22–25	11–15	100–112
21 Nov	Venezuela	3–0	Colombia	25–22	25–19	25–22			75–63
21 Nov	Chile	3–0	Bolivia	25–20	25–10	25–12			75–42
21 Nov	Peru	3–1	Ecuador	25–15	27–29	25–15	25–15		102–74

== Final standings ==
Rank	Team
1st place, gold medalist(s)	Chile
2nd place, silver medalist(s)	Venezuela
3rd place, bronze medalist(s)	Colombia
4.	Peru
5.	Ecuador
6.	Bolivia

2013 Men's Bolivarian champions

Chile
1st title

== Medalists ==
Gold	Silver	Bronze
Chile Simon Guerra; Aaron Reyes; Gabriel Araya; Tomás Parraguirre; Matias Parraguirre; Vicente Parraguirre; Rafael Grimalt; Karim Musa; Rodrigo Jeria; Rafael Albornoz; Tomas Gago; Esteban Villarreal	Venezuela Alberto Briceño; Pedro Brito; Héctor Mata; Carlos Paez; Willner Rivas; Héctor Salerno; Jhoser Contreras; José Manuel Enríquez; Jonathan Quijada; Luis Arias; Edwin Flores; Daniel Escobar	Colombia Andrés Piza; Hugo Bravo; Faver Rivas; Humberto Machacón; Alexander Moreno; José Polchlopek; Julian Churi; Juan Camilo Ambulia; José García; William Bermudez; Kevin Carabali; David Renteria
