= Volleyball at the South American Games =

Volleyball has been in the South American Games event since the first inaugural edition in 1978 in La Paz, Bolivia but cancelled later in the third edition in Santiago, Chile 1986 South American Games then return since the 2010 South American Games in Medellín, Colombia.

== Indoor Volleyball ==
=== Men's tournaments ===
==== Summaries ====
Year	Host	Final			Third-place game		
Year	Host	Gold Medal	Score	Silver Medal	Bronze Medal	Score	Fourth Place
1978; Details	(Bolivia); La Paz	Argentina		Bolivia	Paraguay		
1982; Details	(Argentina); Rosario	Argentina		Brazil	Peru		
No Volleyball Event From 1986 to 2006
2010; Details	(Colombia); Medellín	Argentina	3 – 1	Venezuela	Colombia	3 – 1	Chile
2014; Details	(Chile); Santiago	Argentina	^n/a	Chile	Ecuador	^n/a	Peru
2018; Details	(Bolivia); Cochabamba	Argentina	3 – 2	Chile	Venezuela	3 – 1	Colombia
2022; Details	(Paraguay); Asunción	Chile	^n/a	Colombia	Peru	^n/a	Paraguay
2026; Details	(Argentina); Santa Fe	Chile	3 – 1	Argentina	Colombia	3 – 0	Peru

^n/a A round-robin tournament determined the final standings.

=== Medal summary ===
Rank	Nation	Gold	Silver	Bronze	Total
1	Argentina	5	1	0	6
2	Chile	2	2	0	4
3	Colombia	0	1	2	3
4	Venezuela	0	1	1	2
5	Bolivia	0	1	0	1
5	Brazil	0	1	0	1
7	Peru	0	0	2	2
8	Ecuador	0	0	1	1
8	Paraguay	0	0	1	1
Totals (9 entries)		7	7	7	21

=== Women's tournaments ===
==== Summaries ====
Year	Host	Final			Third-place game		
Year	Host	Champion	Score	Second Place	Third Place	Score	Fourth Place
1978; Details	(Bolivia); La Paz	Bolivia		Paraguay			
1982; Details	(Argentina); Rosario	Peru		Brazil	Argentina		
No Volleyball Events from 1986 to 2006
2010; Details	(Colombia); Medellín	Brazil	3 – 0	Argentina	Peru	3 – 0	Colombia
2014; Details	(Chile); Santiago	Argentina	^n/a	Chile	Brazil	^n/a	Peru
2018; Details	(Bolivia); Cochabamba	Colombia	3 – 0	Argentina	Peru	3 – 0	Bolivia
2022; Details	(Paraguay); Asunción	Peru	3 – 2	Argentina	Chile	3 – 0	Colombia
2026; Details	(Argentina); Santa Fe	Chile	^n/a	Argentina	Colombia	^n/a	Venezuela

^n/a A round-robin tournament determined the final standings.

=== Medal summary ===
Rank	Nation	Gold	Silver	Bronze	Total
1	Peru	2	0	2	4
2	Argentina	1	4	1	6
3	Brazil	1	1	1	3
3	Chile	1	1	1	3
5	Colombia	1	0	1	2
6	Bolivia	1	0	0	1
7	Paraguay	0	1	0	1
Totals (7 entries)		7	7	6	20
