= Humberto Machacón =

Colombian volleyball player (born 1989)

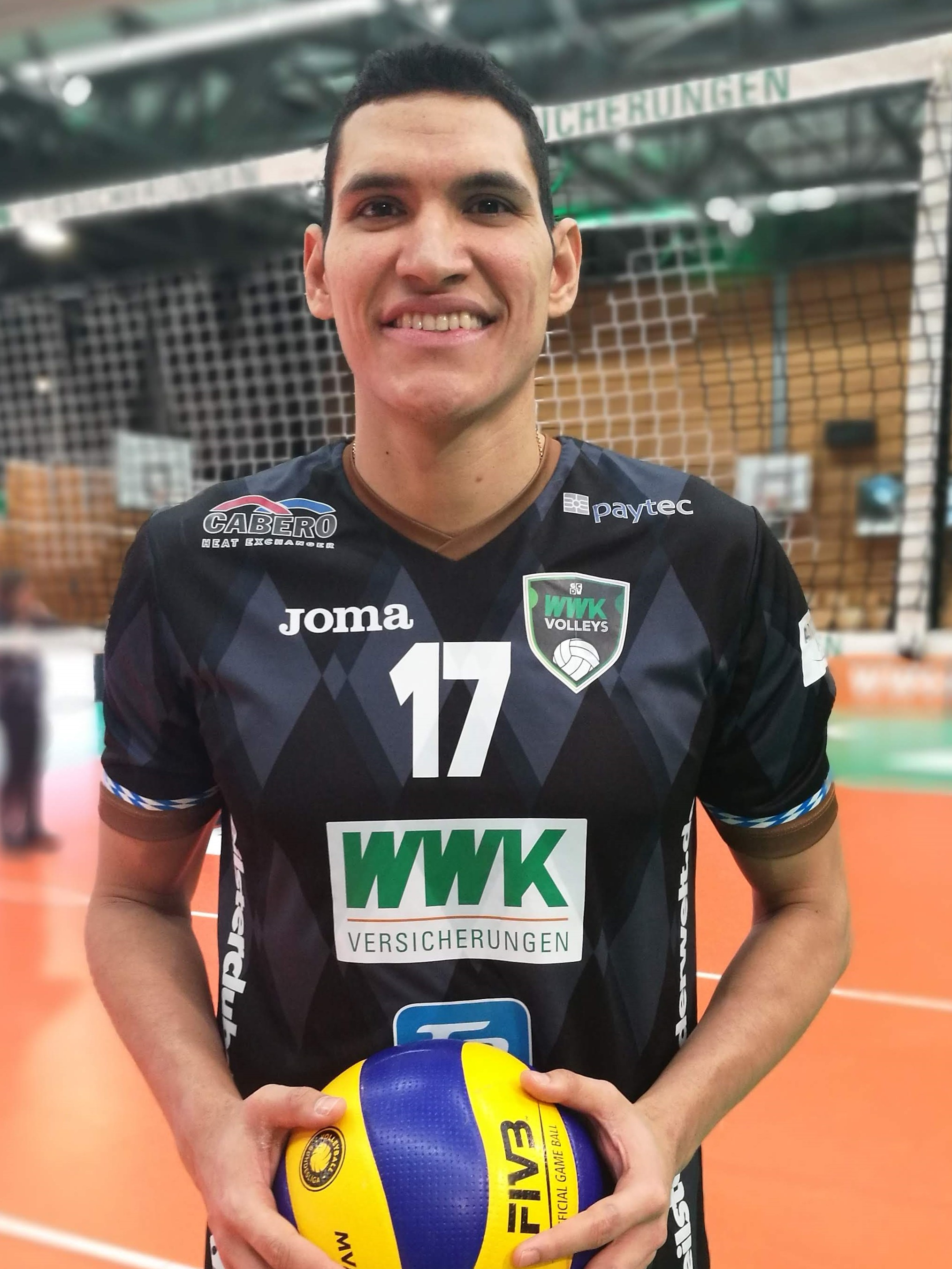

Personal information
- Full name: Humberto Junior Machacón Cabrera
- Nationality: Colombian
- Born: 5 October 1989 (age 37); Barranquilla
- Height: 198 cm (6 ft 6 in)
- Spike: 355 cm (140 in)
- Block: 335 cm (132 in)

Volleyball information
- Position: Outside hitter/spiker

Career
Years	Teams
2010–11	(Spain) CV Teruel
2012–13	(Greece) Foinikas Syros
2013–14	(Turkey) Sivas Belediye Spor
2014–15	(Poland) Effektor Kielce
2015–16	(Spain) Cajasol Juvasa Voley
2016–17	(France) Plessis-Robinson Volley-ball
2018–	(Germany) TSV Herrsching

National team
2008–	Colombia
Honours
Men's volleyball
Representing Colombia
South American Games
Bronze medal – third place	2010 Medellín	Colombia
Bolivarian Games
Bronze medal – third place	2013 Trujillo	Colombia
Central American and Caribbean Games
Silver medal – second place	2018 Barranquilla	Colombia
South American Championship
Bronze medal – third place	2013 Cabo Frio	Colombia

Humberto Junior Machacón Cabrera (born October 5, 1989) in Barranquilla is a professional volleyball player from Colombia.

He plays as an outside hitter in the Colombian national team and for TSV Herrsching in the German Volleyball Bundesliga.

== Career ==
Machacón started his professional career in the Liga Vallecaucana de Voleibol in Cali, Colombia. At the age of 21 he was signed by CV Teruel in the Spanish Superliga. With Teruel he won both the league and the cup. He subsequently played for other European clubs in Greece's first league, the Polish PlusLiga and in Turkey. In 2018 he was signed by TSV Herrsching.

Machacón has been part of the Colombian national team since his youth. He participated and placed on the podium in several occasions, like the South American Games 2010, in the Bolivarian Games 2013, in the Southamerican Championship 2014 and in the Central American Games 2018.
