= 2019 Men's South American Volleyball Championship =

2019 Men's South American Championship
Tournament details
- Host country: Chile
- Dates: 10–14 September
- Teams: 8 (from 1 confederation)
- Venue: 3 (in 3 host cities)

Final positions
- Champions: Brazil (32nd title)
- Runners-up: Argentina
- Third place: Chile
- Fourth place: Venezuela

Tournament awards
- MVP: (Brazil) Alan Souza
- Best Setter: (Argentina) Matías Sánchez
- Best OH: (Brazil) Yoandy Leal (Chile) Dusan Bonacić
- Best MB: (Brazil) Flávio Gualberto (Chile) Gabriel Araya
- Best OPP: (Argentina) Bruno Lima
- Best Libero: (Argentina) Santiago Danani

The 2019 Men's South American Volleyball Championship was the 33rd edition of the Men's South American Volleyball Championship, organised by South America's governing volleyball body, the Confederación Sudamericana de Voleibol (CSV). The tournament was held in Mostazal, Santiago and Temuco, Chile from 10 to 14 September 2019. The top four teams which had not yet qualified to the 2020 Summer Olympics qualified for the 2020 South American Olympic Qualification Tournament.

== Pools composition ==
Pool A	Pool B
Brazil	Chile (Hosts)
Argentina	Venezuela
Colombia	Peru
Ecuador	Bolivia

== Venues ==
- Gimnasio Olímpico Regional UFRO, Temuco, Chile – Pool A and 5th–8th places
- Centro Nacional de Entrenamiento Olímpico, Santiago, Chile – Pool B and Semifinals
- Gran Arena Monticello, Mostazal, Chile – 3rd place match and Final

== Pool standing procedure ==
1. Number of matches won
2. Match points
3. Sets ratio
4. Points ratio
5. If the tie continues as per the point ratio between two teams, the priority will be given to the team which won the last match between them. When the tie in points ratio is between three or more teams, a new classification of these teams in the terms of points 1, 2 and 3 will be made taking into consideration only the matches in which they were opposed to each other.

Match won 3–0 or 3–1: 3 match points for the winner, 0 match points for the loser
Match won 3–2: 2 match points for the winner, 1 match point for the loser

== Preliminary round ==
- All times are Chile Summer Time (UTC−03:00).

=== Pool A ===
Pos	Team	Pld	W	L	Pts	SW	SL	SR	SPW	SPL	SPR	Qualification
1	Brazil	3	3	0	9	9	1	9.000	243	172	1.413	Semifinals
2	Argentina	3	2	1	6	7	3	2.333	240	172	1.395	Semifinals
3	Colombia	3	1	2	3	3	6	0.500	159	201	0.791	5th–8th semifinals
4	Ecuador	3	0	3	0	0	9	0.000	128	225	0.569	5th–8th semifinals

Date	Time		Score		Set 1	Set 2	Set 3	Set 4	Set 5	Total	Report
10 Sep	19:00	Argentina	3–0	Colombia	25–15	25–12	25–15			75–42	Result
10 Sep	21:00	Brazil	3–0	Ecuador	25–10	25–16	25–14			75–40	Result
11 Sep	19:00	Argentina	3–0	Ecuador	25–11	25–14	25–12			75–37	Result
11 Sep	21:00	Brazil	3–0	Colombia	25–15	25–10	25–17			75–42	Result
12 Sep	13:00	Colombia	3–0	Ecuador	25–20	25–14	25–17			75–51	Result
12 Sep	15:00	Brazil	3–1	Argentina	25–23	25–21	18–25	25–21		93–90	Result

=== Pool B ===
Pos	Team	Pld	W	L	Pts	SW	SL	SR	SPW	SPL	SPR	Qualification
1	Venezuela	3	2	1	7	8	4	2.000	278	245	1.135	Semifinals
2	Chile	3	2	1	6	7	3	2.333	241	180	1.339	Semifinals
3	Peru	3	2	1	5	6	5	1.200	225	231	0.974	5th–8th semifinals
4	Bolivia	3	0	3	0	0	9	0.000	138	226	0.611	5th–8th semifinals

Date	Time		Score		Set 1	Set 2	Set 3	Set 4	Set 5	Total	Report
10 Sep	18:30	Venezuela	2–3	Peru	25–22	21–25	21–25	25–17	14–16	106–105	Result
10 Sep	20:30	Chile	3–0	Bolivia	25–9	25–17	25–13			75–39	Result
11 Sep	18:30	Venezuela	3–0	Bolivia	25–13	25–17	25–19			75–49	Result
11 Sep	20:30	Chile	3–0	Peru	25–14	25–17	25–13			75–44	Result
12 Sep	18:30	Peru	3–0	Bolivia	25–12	26–24	25–14			76–50	Result
12 Sep	20:30	Chile	1–3	Venezuela	22–25	20–25	25–21	24–26		91–97	Result

== Final round ==
- All times are Chile Summer Time (UTC−03:00).

=== 5th–8th places ===
5th–8th semifinals
13 September
Peru	3
Ecuador	0
13 September
Colombia	3
Bolivia	0

5th place match
14 September
Peru	3
Colombia	2
7th place match
14 September
Ecuador	3
Bolivia	1

==== 5th–8th semifinals ====
Date	Time		Score		Set 1	Set 2	Set 3	Set 4	Set 5	Total	Report
13 Sep	19:00	Peru	3–0	Ecuador	25–22	25–22	25–15			75–59	Result
13 Sep	21:00	Colombia	3–0	Bolivia	25–19	25–19	25–18			75–56	Result

==== 7th place match ====
Date	Time		Score		Set 1	Set 2	Set 3	Set 4	Set 5	Total	Report
14 Sep	19:00	Ecuador	3–1	Bolivia	22–25	25–15	25–23	25–21		97–84	Result

==== 5th place match ====
Date	Time		Score		Set 1	Set 2	Set 3	Set 4	Set 5	Total	Report
14 Sep	21:00	Peru	3–2	Colombia	25–23	13–25	20–25	26–24	15–10	99–107	Result

=== Final four ===
Semifinals
13 September – Santiago
Venezuela	0
Argentina	3
13 September – Santiago
Brazil	3
Chile	0

Final
14 September – Mostazal
Argentina	2
Brazil	3
3rd place match
14 September – Mostazal
Venezuela	0
Chile	3

==== Semifinals ====
Date	Time		Score		Set 1	Set 2	Set 3	Set 4	Set 5	Total	Report
13 Sep	18:30	Venezuela	0–3	Argentina	13–25	16–25	13–25			42–75	Result
13 Sep	20:30	Brazil	3–0	Chile	25–16	25–17	25–21			75–54	Result

==== 3rd place match ====
Date	Time		Score		Set 1	Set 2	Set 3	Set 4	Set 5	Total	Report
14 Sep	16:00	Venezuela	0–3	Chile	21–25	18–25	13–25			52–75	Result

==== Final ====
Date	Time		Score		Set 1	Set 2	Set 3	Set 4	Set 5	Total	Report
14 Sep	18:30	Argentina	2–3	Brazil	26–24	25–22	29–31	20–25	13–15	113–117	Result

== Final standing ==
Rank	Team
1st place, gold medalist(s)	Brazil
2nd place, silver medalist(s)	Argentina
3rd place, bronze medalist(s)	Chile
4	Venezuela
5	Peru
6	Colombia
7	Ecuador
8	Bolivia

Qualified for the 2020 South American Olympic Qualifier
Already qualified for the 2020 Summer Olympics via the 2019 Intercontinental Olympic Qualifier

2019 Men's South American champions

Brazil
32nd title

14–man roster
Douglas Souza (c), Isac Santos, Cledenilson Batista, Eduardo Sobrinho, Fernando Kreling, Yoandy Leal, Matheus Santos, Hugo Hamacher, Thales Hoss, Felipe Roque, Alan Souza, Maique Nascimento, Flávio Gualberto, Victor Cardoso
Head coach
Renan Dal Zotto

== Awards ==
- Most valuable player
  (Brazil) Alan Souza
- Best setter
  (Argentina) Matías Sánchez
- Best outside spikers
  (Brazil) Yoandy Leal
  (Chile) Dusan Bonacić
- Best middle blockers
  (Brazil) Flávio Gualberto
  (Chile) Gabriel Araya
- Best opposite spiker
  (Argentina) Bruno Lima
- Best libero
  (Argentina) Santiago Danani

== See also ==
- South American Women's Volleyball Championship
- Men's U23 South American Volleyball Championship
- Men's Junior South American Volleyball Championship
- Boys' Youth South American Volleyball Championship
- Boys' U17 South American Volleyball Championship
- Volleyball at the Pan American Games
- Men's Pan-American Volleyball Cup
- Women's Pan-American Volleyball Cup
