= 1971 Men's South American Volleyball Championship =

The 1971 Men's South American Volleyball Championship, the 9th tournament, took place in 1971 in Montevideo (Uruguay).

== Final positions ==
Place	Team
	Brazil
	Uruguay
	Argentina
4	Chile
5	Colombia
6	Peru
7	Paraguay
8	Bolivia
