= Volleyball at the 2013 Bolivarian Games =

The volleyball (Spanish:Voleibol) tournaments, for the 2013 Bolivarian Games in Trujillo, starts on the 16 and ends on 29 November 2013. The indoor volleyball competition takes place at Coliseo Gran Chimu, in the Víctor Larco Herrera district in Trujillo.

== Participating teams ==
Men
- Bolivia
- Chile
- Colombia
- Ecuador
- Peru
- Venezuela

Women
- Bolivia
- Colombia
- Dominican Republic
- Guatemala
- Peru
- Venezuela

== Medal table ==
Key:

* Host nation (Peru)

Rank	Nation	Gold	Silver	Bronze	Total
1	Chile (CHI)	1	0	0	1
1	Peru (PER)*	1	0	0	1
3	Venezuela (VEN)	0	2	0	2
4	Colombia (COL)	0	0	2	2
Totals (4 entries)		2	2	2	6

=== Medalists ===
Event	Gold	Silver	Bronze
Men	Chile Simon Guerra; Aaron Reyes; Gabriel Araya; Tomás Parraguirre; Matias Parraguirre; Vicente Parraguirre; Rafael Grimalt; Karim Musa; Rodrigo Jeria; Rafael Albornoz; Tomas Gago; Esteban Villarreal	Venezuela Alberto Briceño; Pedro Brito; Héctor Mata; Carlos Paez; Willner Rivas; Héctor Salerno; Jhoser Contreras; José Manuel Enríquez; Jonathan Quijada; Luis Arias; Edwin Flores; Daniel Escobar	Colombia Andrés Piza; Hugo Bravo; Faver Rivas; Humberto Machacón; Alexander Moreno; José Polchlopek; Julian Churi; Juan Camilo Ambulia; José García; William Bermudez; Kevin Carabali; David Renteria
Women	Peru Ángela Leyva; Mabel Olemar; Alexandra Muñoz; Maguilaura Frias; Grecia Herrada; Shiamara Almeida; Andrea Urrutia; Luciana Del Valle; Raffaella Camet; Clarivett Yllescas; María de Fátima Acosta; Karla Ortiz	Venezuela Yessica Paz; Luz Delfines; Génesis Francesco; Naimir García; Ahizar Zuniaga; Leyna Morillo; Yorohanny Tovar; Desiree Glod; Mariangel Pérez; Aleoscar Blanco; María José Pérez; Isis Francesco	Colombia Paola Ampudia; Paula Cortes; Amanda Coneo; Yuranny Romaña; Angie Vente; Mery Mancilla; Martha Nieva; Verónica Pasos; María Marín; Melisa Rangel; Cindy Ramírez; Juliana Toro
