= Volleyball at the 2020 Summer Olympics – Men's South American qualification =

2020 Men's South American Olympic Qualification Tournament
Tournament details
- Host country: Chile
- City: Mostazal
- Dates: 10–12 January
- Teams: 4 (from 1 confederation)
- Venue: 1 (in 1 host city)

Final positions
- Champions: Venezuela (2nd title)
- Runners-up: Chile
- Third place: Colombia
- Fourth place: Peru

Tournament statistics
- Matches played: 6

The South American Qualification Tournament for the 2020 Men's Olympic Volleyball Tournament was a volleyball tournament for men's national teams held in Mostazal, Chile from 10 to 12 January 2020. 4 teams played in the tournament and the winners Venezuela qualified for the 2020 Summer Olympics.

== Qualification ==
The top four teams from the 2019 South American Championship which had not yet qualified to the 2020 Summer Olympics qualified for the tournament. Final standings of the 2019 South American Championship are shown in brackets.

- Chile (3)
- Venezuela (4)
- Peru (5)
- Colombia (6)

== Venue ==
- Gran Arena Monticello, Mostazal, Chile

== Pool standing procedure ==
1. Number of matches won
2. Match points
3. Sets ratio
4. Points ratio
5. Result of the last match between the tied teams

Match won 3–0 or 3–1: 3 match points for the winner, 0 match points for the loser
Match won 3–2: 2 match points for the winner, 1 match point for the loser

== Round robin ==
- All times are Chile Summer Time (UTC−03:00).

| Pos | Team | Pld | W | L | Pts | SW | SL | SR | SPW | SPL | SPR |
|---|---|---|---|---|---|---|---|---|---|---|---|
| 1 | Venezuela | 3 | 2 | 1 | 7 | 8 | 4 | 2.000 | 289 | 261 | 1.107 |
| 2 | Chile | 3 | 2 | 1 | 6 | 7 | 5 | 1.400 | 305 | 301 | 1.013 |
| 3 | Colombia | 3 | 2 | 1 | 5 | 7 | 5 | 1.400 | 274 | 262 | 1.046 |
| 4 | Peru | 3 | 0 | 3 | 0 | 1 | 9 | 0.111 | 216 | 260 | 0.831 |

| Date | Time | | Score | | Set 1 | Set 2 | Set 3 | Set 4 | Set 5 | Total | Report |
|---|---|---|---|---|---|---|---|---|---|---|---|
| 10 Jan | 19:50 | Peru | 0–3 | Colombia | 19–25 | 23–25 | 21–25 | | | 63–75 | P2 |
| 10 Jan | 22:30 | Chile | 1–3 | Venezuela | 35–37 | 14–25 | 27–25 | 22–25 | | 98–112 | P2 |
| 11 Jan | 15:50 | Colombia | 3–2 | Venezuela | 23–25 | 25–22 | 25–19 | 24–26 | 15–10 | 112–102 | P2 |
| 11 Jan | 18:40 | Chile | 3–1 | Peru | 36–34 | 24–26 | 25–21 | 25–21 | | 110–102 | P2 |
| 12 Jan | 15:50 | Venezuela | 3–0 | Peru | 25–19 | 25–16 | 25–16 | | | 75–51 | P2 |
| 12 Jan | 18:30 | Chile | 3–1 | Colombia | 25–22 | 22–25 | 25–21 | 25–19 | | 97–87 | P2 |

== Final standing ==
| Rank | Team |
|---|---|
| 1 | Venezuela |
| 2 | Chile |
| 3 | Colombia |
| 4 | Peru |

| Qualified for the 2020 Summer Olympics |

== Qualifying team for Summer Olympics ==
| Team | Qualified on | Previous appearances in Summer Olympics (Note: Bold indicates champions for that year. Italic indicates hosts for that year.) |
|---|---|---|
| Venezuela | 12 January 2020 | 1 (2008) |

== See also ==
- Volleyball at the 2020 Summer Olympics – Women's South American qualification
