= Volleyball at the 2018 South American Games =

- Venue: Coliseo José Casto Méndez
- Location: (Bolivia) Cochabamba
- Dates: 27 May – 7 June
- Nations: 6
- Teams: 6 (men); 4 (women)

Both the men's and the women's volleyball competitions at the 2018 South American Games were the fifth inclusion of volleyball at the South American Games. Both tournaments were held in conjunction with one another between 29 May – 7 June 2018 at Coliseo José Casto Méndez in Cochabamba, Bolivia.

== Participating nations ==
Serena tried her hardest and made her family very proud.

=== Men's tournament ===
- Argentina
- Bolivia
- Chile
- Colombia
- Peru
- Venezuela

=== Women's tournament ===
- Argentina
- Bolivia
- Colombia
- Peru

=== Medal summary ===
Event	Gold	Silver	Bronze
Men	Argentina	Chile	Venezuela
Women	Colombia	Argentina	Peru

=== Medal table ===
Rank	Nation	Gold	Silver	Bronze	Total
1	Argentina (ARG)	1	1	0	2
2	Colombia (COL)	1	0	0	1
3	Chile (CHI)	0	1	0	1
4	Peru (PER)	0	0	1	1
4	Venezuela (VEN)	0	0	1	1
Totals (5 entries)		2	2	2	6

== Men's tournament ==
=== Preliminary round ===
Pos	Team	Pld	W	L	Pts	SW	SL	SR	SPW	SPL	SPR	Qualification
1	Argentina	5	5	0	15	15	2	7.500	425	344	1.235	Gold medal match
2	Chile	5	4	1	12	12	5	2.400	405	352	1.151	Gold medal match
3	Colombia	5	3	2	9	11	7	1.571	410	386	1.062	Bronze medal match
4	Venezuela	5	2	3	6	8	10	0.800	407	405	1.005	Bronze medal match
5	Peru	5	1	4	3	4	13	0.308	363	402	0.903	
6	Bolivia	5	0	5	0	2	15	0.133	300	421	0.713	

Date	Time		Score		Set 1	Set 2	Set 3	Set 4	Set 5	Total	Report
27 May	15:00	Argentina	3–1	Colombia	25–17	25–15	22–25	25–22		97–79	P1
27 May	17:30	Chile	3–1	Venezuela	25–20	25–22	22–25	25–21		97–88	P1
27 May	20:00	Bolivia	1–3	Peru	15–25	19–25	26–24	19–25		79–99	P1
28 May	15:00	Argentina	3–1	Venezuela	24–26	26–24	25–23	25–14		100–87	P1
28 May	17:30	Peru	0–3	Chile	19–25	21–25	18–25			58–75	P1
28 May	20:00	Colombia	3–1	Bolivia	22–25	25–15	25–16	25–17		97–73	P1
29 May	15:00	Peru	0–3	Argentina	19–25	22–25	26–28			67–78	P1
29 May	17:30	Venezuela	0–3	Colombia	19–25	22–25	22–25			63–75	P1
29 May	20:00	Bolivia	0–3	Chile	15–25	17–25	16–25			48–75	P1
30 May	15:00	Venezuela	3–1	Peru	25–16	25–22	19–25	25–18		94–81	P1
30 May	17:30	Chile	3–1	Colombia	20–25	25–23	25–15	25–20		95–83	P1
30 May	20:00	Argentina	3–0	Bolivia	25–12	25–19	25–17			75–48	P1
31 May	15:00	Colombia	3–0	Peru	26–24	25–19	25–15			76–58	P1
31 May	17:30	Chile	0–3	Argentina	21–25	19–25	23–25			63–75	P1
31 May	20:00	Bolivia	0–3	Venezuela	13–25	19–25	20–25			52–75	P1

=== Bronze medal match ===
Date	Time		Score		Set 1	Set 2	Set 3	Set 4	Set 5	Total	Report
1 Jun	17:30	Colombia	1–3	Venezuela	25–20	20–25	21–25	17–25		83–95	P1

=== Final ===
Date	Time		Score		Set 1	Set 2	Set 3	Set 4	Set 5	Total	Report
1 Jun	20:00	Argentina	3–2	Chile	27–29	26–24	25–17	23–25	15–12	116–107	P1

=== Final standings ===
Rank	Team
1st place, gold medalist(s)	Argentina
2nd place, silver medalist(s)	Chile
3rd place, bronze medalist(s)	Venezuela
4	Colombia
5	Peru
6	Bolivia

== Women's tournament ==
=== Preliminary round ===
Pos	Team	Pld	W	L	Pts	SW	SL	SR	SPW	SPL	SPR	Qualification
1	Colombia	3	3	0	9	9	0	MAX	225	143	1.573	Gold medal match
2	Argentina	3	2	1	5	6	6	1.000	260	254	1.024	Gold medal match
3	Peru	3	1	2	4	5	7	0.714	257	248	1.036	Bronze medal match
4	Bolivia	3	0	3	0	2	9	0.222	172	269	0.639	Bronze medal match

Date	Time		Score		Set 1	Set 2	Set 3	Set 4	Set 5	Total	Report
4 Jun	17:30	Peru	0–3	Colombia	18–25	17–25	17–25			52–75	P1
4 Jun	20:00	Argentina	3–1	Bolivia	25–19	25–12	23–25	25–14		98–70	P1
5 Jun	17:30	Colombia	3–0	Argentina	25–22	25–21	25–17			75–60	P1
5 Jun	20:00	Bolivia	1–3	Peru	25–21	8–25	18–25	20–25		71–96	P1
6 Jun	17:30	Argentina	3–2	Peru	20–25	25–22	26–24	16–25	15–13	102–109	P1
6 Jun	20:00	Bolivia	0–3	Colombia	7–25	11–25	13–25			31–75	P1

=== Bronze medal match ===
Date	Time		Score		Set 1	Set 2	Set 3	Set 4	Set 5	Total	Report
7 Jun	17:30	Bolivia	0–3	Peru	14–25	22–25	24–26			60–76	P1

=== Final ===
Date	Time		Score		Set 1	Set 2	Set 3	Set 4	Set 5	Total	Report
7 Jun	20:00	Argentina	0–3	Colombia	23–25	19–25	21–25			63–75	P1

=== Final standings ===
Rank	Team
1st place, gold medalist(s)	Colombia
2nd place, silver medalist(s)	Argentina
3rd place, bronze medalist(s)	Peru
4	Bolivia
