= Volleyball at the 2005 Bolivarian Games – Men's tournament =

This article shows the men's tournament for the 2005 Bolivarian Games, held from August 13 to 18, 2005 at the Mayor Coliseum in Pereira, Colombia.

== Competing nations ==
Bolivia
Colombia
Ecuador
Venezuela

== Preliminary round ==
Pos	Team	Pld	W	L	Pts	SPW	SPL	SPR	SW	SL	SR
1	Venezuela	3	3	0	6	225	154	1.461	9	0	MAX
2	Colombia	3	2	1	5	201	180	1.117	6	3	2.000
3	Bolivia	3	1	2	4	225	250	0.900	3	8	0.375
4	Ecuador	3	0	3	3	200	267	0.749	2	9	0.222

August 13, 2005; 15:00	Venezuela	3–0	Bolivia	Referees: Jorge Erazo (COL)
August 13, 2005; 15:00	(25–15, 25–21, 25–14)			Referees: Jorge Erazo (COL)

August 14, 2005; 15:00	Colombia	3–0	Ecuador	Referees: Piedad Londoño (COL)
August 14, 2005; 15:00	(25–15, 25–15, 25–17)			Referees: Piedad Londoño (COL)

August 15, 2005; 13:00	Ecuador	0–3	Venezuela	Referees: Jorge Erazo (COL)
August 15, 2005; 13:00	(15–25, 19–25, 19–25)			Referees: Jorge Erazo (COL)

August 15, 2005; 19:00	Colombia	3–0	Bolivia	Referees: Elbis Zamora (VEN)
August 15, 2005; 19:00	(25–19, 25–22, 25–17)			Referees: Elbis Zamora (VEN)

August 16, 2005; 13:00	Ecuador	2–3	Bolivia	Referees: Mauricio Villafañe (COL)
August 16, 2005; 13:00	(29–27, 27–25, 20–25, 18–25, 6–15)			Referees: Mauricio Villafañe (COL)

August 16, 2005; 19:00	Colombia	0–3	Venezuela	Referees: Rocio Huarcaya (PER)
August 16, 2005; 19:00	(16–25, 17–25, 18–25)			Referees: Rocio Huarcaya (PER)

== Final round ==
Semi-finals
2005-08-17 – Pereira, Colombia
Venezuela	3
Ecuador	0
2005-08-17 – Pereira, Colombia
Colombia	3
Bolivia	0

Final
2005-08-18 – Pereira, Colombia
Venezuela	3
Colombia	0
3rd place
2005-08-18 – Pereira, Colombia
Bolivia	3
Ecuador	0

=== Semifinals ===
August 17, 2005; 14:00	Venezuela	3–0	Ecuador	Referees: Omar Castro (COL)
August 17, 2005; 14:00	(25–17, 25–19, 25–20)			Referees: Omar Castro (COL)

August 17, 2005; 20:00	Colombia	3–0	Bolivia	Referees: Elbis Zamora (VEN)
August 17, 2005; 20:00	(25–19, 25–14, 25–14)			Referees: Elbis Zamora (VEN)

=== Finals ===
==== Bronze-medal match ====
August 18, 2005; 17:00	Bolivia	3–0	Ecuador	Referees: Jorge Erazo (COL)
August 18, 2005; 17:00	(25–15, 25–23, 25–17)			Referees: Jorge Erazo (COL)

==== Gold-medal match ====
August 18, 2005; 19:00	Colombia	0–3	Venezuela	Referees: Rocio Huarcaya (PER)
August 18, 2005; 19:00	(29–31, 19–25, 13–25)			Referees: Rocio Huarcaya (PER)

=== Final standings ===
1. Venezuela
2. Colombia
3. Bolivia
4. Ecuador

2005 Bolivarian Games winners

Venezuela
