= Bruno Lima =

Argentine volleyball player (born 1996)

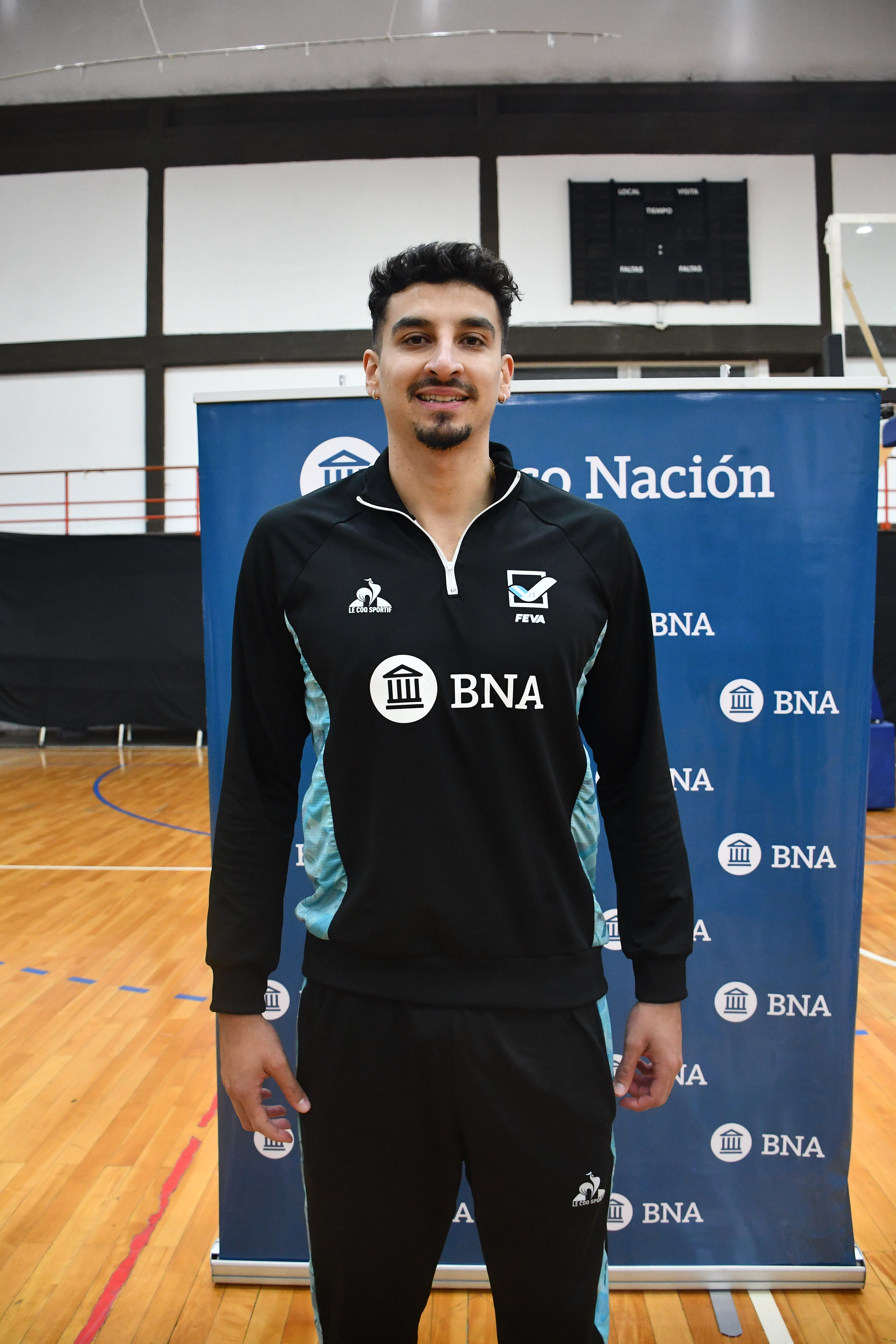
- Lima in 2024

Personal information
- Full name: Bruno Lima Basolu
- Born: 4 February 1996 (age 30); San Juan, Argentina
- Height: 1.98 m (6 ft 6 in)
- Weight: 85 kg (187 lb)
- Spike: 341 cm (134 in)
- Block: 320 cm (126 in)

Volleyball information
- Position: Opposite
- Current club: Vôlei Renata

Career
Years	Teams
2011–2014; 2014–2015; 2015–2017; 2017–2018; 2018; 2018–2019; 2019–2020; 2020–2021; 2021–2022; 2022–2023; 2023–	Obras de San Juan; Bolívar Voley; Obras de San Juan; Chaumont VB 52; Obras de San Juan; Volleyball Bisons Bühl; Gigantes del Sur; Afyon Belediye Yüntaş; Nice VB; Al Hilal; Vôlei Renata

National team
Argentina
Honours
Men's volleyball
Representing Argentina
Olympic Games
Bronze medal – third place	2020 Tokyo
Pan American Games
Silver medal – second place	2023 Santiago
Pan American Cup
Gold medal – first place	2017 Gatineau
Silver medal – second place	2016 Mexico City
CSV South American Championship
Gold medal – first place	2023 Recife
Silver medal – second place	2019 Chile

Bruno Lima Basolu (born 4 February 1996) is an Argentine professional volleyball player who plays as an opposite spiker for Vôlei Renata and the Argentina national team. Lima won a bronze medal at the Olympic Games 2020 Tokyo.

== Honours ==
=== Club ===
- Domestic
  - 2014–15 Argentine Cup, with Bolívar Vóley
  - 2017–18 French SuperCup, with Chaumont VB 52

=== Youth national team ===
- 2012 CSV U19 South American Championship
- 2015 FIVB U21 World Championship
- 2016 U23 Pan American Cup

=== Individual awards ===
- 2019: CSV South American Championship – Best opposite spiker
