= Volleyball at the 2022 South American Games – Men's tournament =

2022 South American Games men's volleyball tournament
Tournament details
- Host country: Paraguay
- City: Asunción
- Dates: 4–8 October 2022
- Teams: 5 (from 1 confederation)
- Venue: 1 (in 1 host city)

Final positions
- Champions: Chile (2nd title)
- Runners-up: Colombia
- Third place: Peru
- Fourth place: Paraguay

Tournament statistics
- Matches played: 10

The men's tournament of the volleyball at the 2022 South American Games was held from 4 to 8 October 2022 at the Paraguayan Volleyball Federation facilities in the SND complex cluster in Asunción, Paraguay. It was the sixth appearance of the volleyball men's tournament since the first edition in La Paz 1978 (it was not held from Santiago 1986 to Buenos Aires 2006).

Argentina were the five-time defending champions, having won all the previous editions of the tournament, but did not participate in this edition leaving its place vacant.

Chile won the gold medal and their first South American Games men's volleyball title after finishing in the first place of the single group with a match record of 4 wins and 0 losses and without conceding any set. Colombia and Peru got the silver and bronze medals respectively.

== Schedule ==
The tournament was held over a 5-day period, from 4 to 8 October.

GM	Group matches	G	Gold medal match

Tue 4	Wed 5	Thu 6	Fri 7	Sat 8	
GM	GM	GM	GM	GM	G
2 M	2 M	2 M	2 M	2 M	

== Teams ==
A total of six ODESUR NOCs entered teams for the men's tournament.

Teams	App	Previous best performance
Bolivia	3rd	Silver medal (1978)
Chile	4th	Silver medal (2014, 2018)
Colombia	4th	Bronze medal (2010)
Paraguay	2nd	Bronze medal (1978)
Peru	5th	Bronze medal (1982)

=== Rosters ===
Each participating NOC had to enter a roster of 12 players (Technical manual Article 9.3).

== Competition format ==
The tournament consisted of a single group of 5 teams in which each team played once against the other 4 teams in the group on a single round-robin format (Technical manual Article 5). The top three teams were awarded gold, silver and bronze medals respectively.

== Results ==
=== Standings ===
The pool ranking criteria was the following (Technical manual Articles 5.2 and 5.3):

1. Number of matches won
2. Match points
  - Match won 3–0 or 3–1: 3 points for the winner, 0 points for the loser
  - Match won 3–2: 2 points for the winner, 1 point for the loser
3. Sets ratio
4. Points ratio
5. Result of the match between the tied teams

Pos	Team	Pld	W	L	Pts	SW	SL	SR	SPW	SPL	SPR	Final result
1	Chile (C)	4	4	0	12	12	0	MAX	302	200	1.510	Gold medal
2	Colombia	4	3	1	7	9	7	1.286	341	330	1.033	Silver medal
3	Peru	4	2	2	7	8	6	1.333	303	303	1.000	Bronze medal
4	Paraguay (H)	4	1	3	4	5	9	0.556	299	311	0.961	Fourth place
5	Bolivia	4	0	4	0	0	12	0.000	202	303	0.667	Fifth place

Source: ASU2022
Rules for classification: 1) Matches won; 2) Points; 3) Sets Ratio; 4)Points ratio; 5) Head-to-head result.
(C) Champion; (H) Host

=== Matches ===
All match times are in PYST (UTC−3).

4 October 2022; 9:00	Chile	3–0	Bolivia	Paraguayan Volleyball Federation – SND court 1 Referees: Cristina Gamarra (PAR), Jonatan Escudero (ARG)
4 October 2022; 9:00	(25–9, 25–14, 25–13); Report			Paraguayan Volleyball Federation – SND court 1 Referees: Cristina Gamarra (PAR), Jonatan Escudero (ARG)

4 October 2022; 12:00	Paraguay	0–3	Peru	Paraguayan Volleyball Federation – SND court 1 Referees: José Blanco (VEN), Sebastián Leyton (CHI)
4 October 2022; 12:00	(21–25, 20–25, 22–25); Report			Paraguayan Volleyball Federation – SND court 1 Referees: José Blanco (VEN), Sebastián Leyton (CHI)

5 October 2022; 9:00	Peru	3–0	Bolivia	Paraguayan Volleyball Federation – SND court 1 Referees: Yeison García (COL), Fabián Gal (URU)
5 October 2022; 9:00	(25–20, 25–14, 25–22); Report			Paraguayan Volleyball Federation – SND court 1 Referees: Yeison García (COL), Fabián Gal (URU)

5 October 2022; 11:30	Paraguay	2–3	Colombia	Paraguayan Volleyball Federation – SND court 1 Referees: Andre Calado (BRA), Jaime Suárez (BOL)
5 October 2022; 11:30	(25–21, 25–22, 23–25, 21–25, 6–15); Report			Paraguayan Volleyball Federation – SND court 1 Referees: Andre Calado (BRA), Jaime Suárez (BOL)

6 October 2022; 9:00	Colombia	3–2	Peru	Paraguayan Volleyball Federation – SND court 1 Referees: Cristina Gamarra (PAR), José Blanco (VEN)
6 October 2022; 9:00	(25–19, 23–25, 25–17, 21–25, 15–10); Report			Paraguayan Volleyball Federation – SND court 1 Referees: Cristina Gamarra (PAR), José Blanco (VEN)

6 October 2022; 11:30	Paraguay	0–3	Chile	Paraguayan Volleyball Federation – SND court 1 Referees: Jonatan Escudero (ARG), Andrés Checa (ECU)
6 October 2022; 11:30	(20–25, 19–25, 22–25); Report			Paraguayan Volleyball Federation – SND court 1 Referees: Jonatan Escudero (ARG), Andrés Checa (ECU)

7 October 2022; 9:00	Colombia	3–0	Bolivia	Paraguayan Volleyball Federation – SND court 1 Referees: Fabián Gal (URU), Julio Lluque (PER)
7 October 2022; 9:00	(25–15, 28–26, 25–16); Report			Paraguayan Volleyball Federation – SND court 1 Referees: Fabián Gal (URU), Julio Lluque (PER)

7 October 2022; 11:30	Chile	3–0	Peru	Paraguayan Volleyball Federation – SND court 1 Referees: Jaime Suárez (BOL), Yeison García (COL)
7 October 2022; 11:30	(25–14, 25–20, 25–23); Report			Paraguayan Volleyball Federation – SND court 1 Referees: Jaime Suárez (BOL), Yeison García (COL)

8 October 2022; 10:30	Chile	3–0	Colombia	Paraguayan Volleyball Federation – SND court 1 Referees: Andre Calado (BRA), Cristina Gamarra (PAR)
8 October 2022; 10:30	(25–11, 25–12, 25–23); Report			Paraguayan Volleyball Federation – SND court 1 Referees: Andre Calado (BRA), Cristina Gamarra (PAR)

8 October 2022; 19:30	Paraguay	3–0	Bolivia	Paraguayan Volleyball Federation – SND court 1 Referees: Sebastián Leyton (CHI), Andrés Checa (ECU)
8 October 2022; 19:30	(25–19, 25–17, 25–17); Report			Paraguayan Volleyball Federation – SND court 1 Referees: Sebastián Leyton (CHI), Andrés Checa (ECU)

== Final ranking ==
Rank	Team
1st place, gold medalist(s)	Chile
2nd place, silver medalist(s)	Colombia
3rd place, bronze medalist(s)	Peru
4	Paraguay
5	Bolivia

2022 Men's South American Games

Chile
First title

Team roster: Esteban Villarreal, Vicente Ibarra, Gabriel Araya, Tomás Parraguirre, Vicente Parraguirre, Tomás Gago, Sebastián Albornoz, Dusan Bonacic (c), Vicente Mardones, Sebastián Castillo (L), Jaime Bravo
Kaj Bonacic
Head coach: Daniel Nejamkin

== Medalists ==
Gold	Silver	Bronze
Chile Esteban Villarreal; Vicente Ibarra; Gabriel Araya; Tomás Parraguirre; Vicente Parraguirre; Tomás Gago; Sebastián Albornoz; Dusan Bonacic (c); Vicente Mardones; Sebastián Castillo (L); Jaime Bravo; Kaj Bonacic Head coach: Daniel Nejamkin	Colombia Orian Medina; Juan Velasco; Ronnie Mosquera; Leiner Aponzá; Juan Estupiñan; Samuel Jaramillo; Daniel Medina (c); Roosvuelt Ramos (L); Oliver Murillo; Santiago Ruiz; Jhon Cuello; Harry Rivas Head coach: Jorge Schmidt	Peru Jassir Morón (L); Sebastián Blanco; Bruno Seminario; Benjamín Patrón; Hiroshi la Torre; Eduardo Romay (c); Daniel Barbieri; Juan Silva-Santisteban; Benny Bernaola; Álvaro Hidalgo; Francis Mendoza; Daniel Porras Head coach: Juan Carlos Gala
