= Rodrigo Quiroga =

Argentine volleyball player (born 1987)

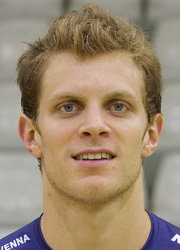
- Quiroga in 2011

Personal information
- Full name: Rodrigo Daniel Quiroga
- Born: March 23, 1987 (age 39); San Juan, Argentina
- Height: 1.94 m (6 ft 4 in)
- Weight: 84 kg (185 lb)
- Spike: 345 cm (136 in)
- Block: 327 cm (129 in)

Volleyball information
- Position: Outside hitter
- Current club: Jastrzębski Węgiel
- Number: 7

Career
Years	Teams
2005–2006; 2006–2007; 2007–2008; 2008–2009; 2009; 2009–2010; 2010–2011; 2011–2012; 2012; 2012–2013; 2013–2014; 2014–2015; 2015–2016; 2016–2017; 2017–	Club de Amigos; Bassano Volley; Pallavolo Catania; Volley Cavriago; Kalleh Mazandaran VC; Callipo Sport; Iraklis Thessaloniki; GS Costa Ravenna; Fenerbahçe Istanbul; Minas Tênis Clube; Ziober Maringá; Canoas Volei; Obras Sanitarias de San Juan; Al-Nasr Dubai VC; Jastrzębski Węgiel

National team
2007-	Argentina (161)
Honours
Men's volleyball
Representing Argentina
Pan American Games
Gold medal – first place	2015 Canada
South American Championship
Silver medal – second place	2007 Chile
Silver medal – second place	2009 Colombia
Silver medal – second place	2011 Brazil
Silver medal – second place	2013 Brazil
Silver medal – second place	2015 Brazil
- Last updated: 12 January 2018

Rodrigo Daniel Quiroga (born March 23, 1987) is an Argentine volleyball player member of the Argentina men's national volleyball team and Polish club Jastrzębski Węgiel. He participated at the 2012 Summer Olympics. Rodrigo won the silver medal at the South American Championship in 2007, 2009, 2011 and 2013 and the gold medal at the 2015 Pan American Games.

== Personal life ==
He is nephew of Raúl Quiroga, who was bronze medalist of the Olympic Games 1988 and son of Daniel Quiroga - a former volleyball player. His brother Gonzalo also plays volleyball.

== Career ==
=== Clubs ===
In September 2014 Quiroga signed a contract with Brazilian team Vôlei Canoas.

== Sporting achievements ==
=== Clubs ===
==== Men's South American Volleyball Club Championship ====
- 2013 - with Vivo/Minas

==== National championships ====
- 2005/2006 Argentine Championship, with Club de Amigos
- 2011/2012 Turkish Cup, with Fenerbahçe Grundig
- 2011/2012 Turkish Championship, with Fenerbahçe Grundig

=== National team ===
==== Pan American Games ====
- 2015 Canada

==== South American Championship ====
- 2007 Chile
- 2009 Colombia
- 2011 Brazil
- 2013 Brazil

=== Individually ===
- 2013 South American Club Championship - Best Outside Spiker
- 2013 South American Championship - Best Outside Spiker
- 2015 South American Championship - Best Outside Spiker
