= Volleyball at the 2023 Pan American Games – Men's tournament =

Volleyball – Men's tournament at the 2023 Pan American Games
- Venue: Arena Parque O'Higgins
- Dates: 30 October – 4 November
- Competitors: 96 from 8 nations

Medalists
Gold medal	Brazil
Silver medal	Argentina
Bronze medal	Colombia

The men's volleyball tournament at the 2023 Pan American Games was the 18th edition of the volleyball event for men at the Pan American Games. It was held from 30 October to 4 November 2023. All games were played at the Arena Parque O'Higgins in Santiago, Chile.

== Schedule ==
The schedule is as follows.

Legend
G	Group stage	¼	Quarter-finals	½	Semi-finals	B	Bronze medal match	F	Gold medal match

Mon 30	Tue 31	Wed 1	Thu 2	Fri 3	Sat 4	
G	G	G	¼	½	B	F

== Qualification ==
A total eight men's teams qualified to compete at the games in each tournament. The host nation (Chile) qualified automatically, along with seven other teams in various qualifying tournaments.

Event	Dates	Location	Quota(s)	Qualified
Host Nation	—N/a	—N/a	1	Chile
2021 Pan-American Cup	3–9 September	(Dominican Republic) Santo Domingo	1	Mexico
2021 Junior Pan American Games	26–30 November	(Colombia) Cali	2	Brazil; Dominican Republic
2022 Pan-American Cup	9–14 August	(Canada) Gatineau	1	Cuba
CSV Qualifying Tournament	20–24 September	(Chile) Santiago	2	Argentina; Colombia
2023 Pan-American Cup	13–21 August	(Mexico) Guadalajara	1	~~Canada~~; Puerto Rico
Total			8	

== Results ==
All times are in Chile Time (UTC−3).

=== Group A ===
Pos	Team	Pld	W	L	Pts	SPW	SPL	SPR	SW	SL	SR
1	Brazil	3	3	0	8	261	202	1.292	9	2	4.500
2	Cuba	3	2	1	6	292	285	1.025	8	5	1.600
3	Colombia	3	1	2	3	190	215	0.884	3	6	0.500
4	Mexico	3	0	3	1	219	260	0.842	2	9	0.222

Source: Santiago 2023

30 October 2023; 10:30	Brazil	3–0	Colombia	Arena Parque O'Higgins, Santiago; Attendance: 8,000
30 October 2023; 10:30	(25–20, 25–17, 25–10); P2 P3			Arena Parque O'Higgins, Santiago; Attendance: 8,000

30 October 2023; 13:30	Cuba	3–2	Mexico	Arena Parque O'Higgins, Santiago; Attendance: 4,500
30 October 2023; 13:30	(25–20, 24–26, 19–25, 27–25, 15–10); P2P3			Arena Parque O'Higgins, Santiago; Attendance: 4,500

31 October 2023; 10:30	Cuba	3–0	Colombia	Arena Parque O'Higgins, Santiago; Attendance: 4,000
31 October 2023; 10:30	(25–22, 25–23, 25–23); P2P3			Arena Parque O'Higgins, Santiago; Attendance: 4,000

31 October 2023; 13:30	Brazil	3–0	Mexico	Arena Parque O'Higgins, Santiago; Attendance: 8,814
31 October 2023; 13:30	(25–13, 25–15, 25–20); P2P3			Arena Parque O'Higgins, Santiago; Attendance: 8,814

1 November 2023; 10:30	Brazil	3–2	Cuba	Arena Parque O'Higgins, Santiago; Attendance: 10,000
1 November 2023; 10:30	(25–23, 25–16, 18–25, 25–27, 18–16); P2P3			Arena Parque O'Higgins, Santiago; Attendance: 10,000

1 November 2023; 13:30	Colombia	3–0	Mexico	Arena Parque O'Higgins, Santiago; Attendance: 6,000
1 November 2023; 13:30	(25–23, 25–23, 25–19); P2P3			Arena Parque O'Higgins, Santiago; Attendance: 6,000

=== Group B ===
Pos	Team	Pld	W	L	Pts	SPW	SPL	SPR	SW	SL	SR
1	Argentina	3	3	0	9	251	208	1.207	9	1	9.000
2	Chile	3	2	1	6	253	253	1.000	6	5	1.200
3	Puerto Rico	3	1	2	3	245	264	0.928	4	7	0.571
4	Dominican Republic	3	0	3	0	265	289	0.917	3	9	0.333

Source: Santiago 2023

30 October 2023; 17:30	Argentina	3–0	Puerto Rico	Arena Parque O'Higgins, Santiago; Attendance: 7,000
30 October 2023; 17:30	(25–23, 26–24, 25–15); P2P3			Arena Parque O'Higgins, Santiago; Attendance: 7,000

30 October 2023; 20:30	Chile	3–1	Dominican Republic	Arena Parque O'Higgins, Santiago; Attendance: 9,752
30 October 2023; 20:30	(25–20, 21–25, 25–22, 25–21); P2P3			Arena Parque O'Higgins, Santiago; Attendance: 9,752

31 October 2023; 17:30	Argentina	3–1	Dominican Republic	Arena Parque O'Higgins, Santiago; Attendance: 10,000
31 October 2023; 17:30	(20–25, 30–28, 25–17, 25–20); P2P3			Arena Parque O'Higgins, Santiago; Attendance: 10,000

31 October 2023; 20:30	Chile	3–1	Puerto Rico	Arena Parque O'Higgins, Santiago; Attendance: 10,000
31 October 2023; 20:30	(26–28, 25–18, 25–21, 25–23); P2P3			Arena Parque O'Higgins, Santiago; Attendance: 10,000

1 November 2023; 17:30	Puerto Rico	3–1	Dominican Republic	Arena Parque O'Higgins, Santiago; Attendance: 9,100
1 November 2023; 17:30	(25–23, 18–25, 25–19, 25–20); P2P3			Arena Parque O'Higgins, Santiago; Attendance: 9,100

1 November 2023; 20:30	Chile	0–3	Argentina	Arena Parque O'Higgins, Santiago; Attendance: 10,000
1 November 2023; 20:30	(15–25, 20–25, 21–25); P2P3			Arena Parque O'Higgins, Santiago; Attendance: 10,000

== Elimination round ==
=== Championship bracket ===
Quarterfinals
A2	Cuba	3
B3	Puerto Rico	2
B2	Chile	1
A3	Colombia	3

Semifinals
B1	Argentina	3
A2	Cuba	1
A1	Brazil	3
A3	Colombia	0

Final
B1	Argentina	0
A1	Brazil	3
Third place
A2	Cuba	1
A3	Colombia	3

=== Quarterfinals ===
2 November 2023; 10:30	Chile	1–3	Colombia	Arena Parque O'Higgins, Santiago; Attendance: 9,800
2 November 2023; 10:30	(20–25, 25–21, 19–25, 23–25); P2P3			Arena Parque O'Higgins, Santiago; Attendance: 9,800

2 November 2023; 13:30	Cuba	3–2	Puerto Rico	Arena Parque O'Higgins, Santiago; Attendance: 4,000
2 November 2023; 13:30	(25–16, 25–21, 13–25, 22–25, 15–11); P2P3			Arena Parque O'Higgins, Santiago; Attendance: 4,000

==== 5–8th place semifinals ====
3 November 2023; 10:30	Dominican Republic	3–2	Chile	Arena Parque O'Higgins, Santiago
3 November 2023; 10:30	(22–25, 25–19, 21–25, 26–24, 16–14)			Arena Parque O'Higgins, Santiago

3 November 2023; 13:30	Mexico	3–2	Puerto Rico	Arena Parque O'Higgins, Santiago
3 November 2023; 13:30	(25–21, 22–25, 25–21, 28–30, 16–14)			Arena Parque O'Higgins, Santiago

=== Semifinals ===
3 November 2023; 17:30	Argentina	3–1	Cuba	Arena Parque O'Higgins, Santiago
3 November 2023; 17:30	(21–25, 25–22, 25–18, 25–18)			Arena Parque O'Higgins, Santiago

3 November 2023; 20:30	Brazil	3–0	Colombia	Arena Parque O'Higgins, Santiago
3 November 2023; 20:30	(26–24, 25–18, 25–15)			Arena Parque O'Higgins, Santiago

=== Seventh place match ===
4 November 2023; 10:00	Chile	3–0	Puerto Rico	Arena Parque O'Higgins, Santiago
4 November 2023; 10:00	(25–22, 25–15, 25–18)			Arena Parque O'Higgins, Santiago

=== Fifth place match ===
4 November 2023; 13:00	Dominican Republic	3–1	Mexico	Arena Parque O'Higgins, Santiago
4 November 2023; 13:00	(31–33, 25–22, 25–18, 25–22)			Arena Parque O'Higgins, Santiago

=== Bronze medal match ===
4 November 2023; 17:00	Cuba	1–3	Colombia	Arena Parque O'Higgins, Santiago
4 November 2023; 17:00	(30–32, 25–15, 27–29, 17–25)			Arena Parque O'Higgins, Santiago

=== Gold medal match ===
4 November 2023; 20:00	Argentina	0–3	Brazil	Arena Parque O'Higgins, Santiago
4 November 2023; 20:00	(23–25, 13–25, 22–25)			Arena Parque O'Higgins, Santiago

== Final standings ==
Rank	Team
1st place, gold medalist(s)	Brazil
2nd place, silver medalist(s)	Argentina
3rd place, bronze medalist(s)	Colombia
4	Cuba
5	Dominican Republic
6	Mexico
7	Chile
8	Puerto Rico

== Awards ==
- Most valuable player
- Best setter
- Best outside hitters
- Best middle blockers
- Best opposite
- Best libero
