= 1967 Men's South American Volleyball Championship =

The 1967 Men's South American Volleyball Championship, the 7th tournament, took place in 1967 in Santos (Brazil).

== Final positions ==
Place	Team
	Brazil
	Venezuela
	Chile
4	Uruguay
5	Paraguay
