= Volleyball at the 2018 Central American and Caribbean Games =

- Venue: Humberto Perea Coliseum
- Location: (Colombia) Barranquilla
- Dates: 20 July – 2 August
- Nations: 9
- Teams: 8 (men); 8 (women)

Champions
- Men: Puerto Rico
- Women: Dominican Republic

The volleyball competition at the 2018 Central American and Caribbean Games was held in Barranquilla, Colombia at the Humberto Perea Coliseum. The women's tournament was held from the 20 to 25 July, whilst the men's tournament was held from the 28 July to 2 August.

== Medal summary ==
=== Medalists ===
| Event | Gold | Silver | Bronze |
|---|---|---|---|
| Men | Puerto Rico | Colombia | Mexico |
| Women | Dominican Republic | Colombia | Puerto Rico |

=== Medal table ===
| Rank | Nation | Gold | Silver | Bronze | Total |
|---|---|---|---|---|---|
| 1 | Puerto Rico (PUR) | 1 | 0 | 1 | 2 |
| 2 | Dominican Republic (DOM) | 1 | 0 | 0 | 1 |
| 3 | Colombia (COL)* | 0 | 2 | 0 | 2 |
| 4 | Mexico (MEX) | 0 | 0 | 1 | 1 |
| Totals (4 entries) | | 2 | 2 | 2 | 6 |

== Men's tournament ==
=== Qualification ===
| Means of qualification | Date | Vacancies | Qualifier |
|---|---|---|---|
| Host country | 11 June 2014 | 1 | Colombia |
| NORCECA Ranking | 31 December 2017 | 6 | Cuba; Puerto Rico; Mexico; Dominican Republic; Guatemala; Trinidad and Tobago |
| Invitation | | 1 | Venezuela |
| Total | | 8 | |

=== Pools composition ===
| Pool A | Pool B |
|---|---|
| Cuba (16) | Colombia (41) |
| Dominican Republic (38) | Guatemala (41) |
| Mexico (19) | Puerto Rico (29) |
| Venezuela (22) | Trinidad and Tobago (50) |

=== Pool standing procedure ===
1. Number of matches won
2. Match points
3. Points ratio
4. Sets ratio
5. Result of the last match between the tied teams

Match won 3–0: 5 match points for the winner, 0 match points for the loser
Match won 3–1: 4 match points for the winner, 1 match point for the loser
Match won 3–2: 3 match points for the winner, 2 match points for the loser

=== Preliminary round ===
- All times are local (UTC–5).

==== Pool A ====
| Pos | Team | Pld | W | L | Pts | SPW | SPL | SPR | SW | SL | SR | Qualification |
|---|---|---|---|---|---|---|---|---|---|---|---|---|
| 1 | Cuba | 3 | 3 | 0 | 15 | 227 | 174 | 1.305 | 9 | 0 | MAX | Semifinals |
| 2 | Mexico | 3 | 2 | 1 | 9 | 228 | 216 | 1.056 | 6 | 4 | 1.500 | Quarterfinals |
| 3 | Venezuela | 3 | 1 | 2 | 4 | 258 | 272 | 0.949 | 4 | 8 | 0.500 | Quarterfinals |
| 4 | Dominican Republic | 3 | 0 | 3 | 2 | 207 | 258 | 0.802 | 2 | 9 | 0.222 | 5–8th place semifinals |

| Date | Time | | Score | | Set 1 | Set 2 | Set 3 | Set 4 | Set 5 | Total | Report |
|---|---|---|---|---|---|---|---|---|---|---|---|
| 28 Jul | 17:00 | Cuba | 3–0 | Venezuela | 25–21 | 27–25 | 25–21 | | | 77–67 | P2 P3 |
| 28 Jul | 19:00 | Dominican Republic | 0–3 | Mexico | 24–26 | 20–25 | 13–25 | | | 57–76 | P2 P3 |
| 29 Jul | 17:00 | Venezuela | 3–2 | Dominican Republic | 18–25 | 25–17 | 25–23 | 24–26 | 15–11 | 107–102 | P2 P3 |
| 29 Jul | 19:45 | Cuba | 3–0 | Mexico | 25–23 | 25–18 | 25–18 | | | 75–59 | P2 P3 |
| 30 Jul | 17:25 | Mexico | 3–1 | Venezuela | 25–19 | 18–25 | 25–22 | 25–18 | | 93–84 | P2 P3 |
| 30 Jul | 19:50 | Dominican Republic | 0–3 | Cuba | 22–25 | 12–25 | 14–25 | | | 48–75 | P2 P3 |

==== Pool B ====
| Pos | Team | Pld | W | L | Pts | SPW | SPL | SPR | SW | SL | SR | Qualification |
|---|---|---|---|---|---|---|---|---|---|---|---|---|
| 1 | Puerto Rico | 3 | 3 | 0 | 15 | 226 | 156 | 1.449 | 9 | 0 | MAX | Semifinals |
| 2 | Colombia | 3 | 2 | 1 | 8 | 243 | 234 | 1.038 | 6 | 5 | 1.200 | Quarterfinals |
| 3 | Guatemala | 3 | 1 | 2 | 4 | 206 | 237 | 0.869 | 3 | 7 | 0.429 | Quarterfinals |
| 4 | Trinidad and Tobago | 3 | 0 | 3 | 3 | 230 | 278 | 0.827 | 3 | 9 | 0.333 | 5–8th place semifinals |

| Date | Time | | Score | | Set 1 | Set 2 | Set 3 | Set 4 | Set 5 | Total | Report |
|---|---|---|---|---|---|---|---|---|---|---|---|
| 28 Jul | 15:00 | Puerto Rico | 3–0 | Guatemala | 25–14 | 25–16 | 25–17 | | | 75–47 | P2 P3 |
| 28 Jul | 21:00 | Colombia | 3–2 | Trinidad and Tobago | 19–25 | 25–19 | 22–25 | 25–19 | 15–8 | 106–96 | P2 P3 |
| 29 Jul | 15:00 | Trinidad and Tobago | 0–3 | Puerto Rico | 11–25 | 18–25 | 19–25 | | | 48–75 | P2 P3 |
| 29 Jul | 21:45 | Colombia | 3–0 | Guatemala | 25–17 | 25–21 | 26–24 | | | 76–62 | P2 P3 |
| 30 Jul | 15:00 | Guatemala | 3–1 | Trinidad and Tobago | 25–22 | 25–17 | 22–25 | 25–22 | | 97–86 | P2 P3 |
| 30 Jul | 21:30 | Colombia | 0–3 | Puerto Rico | 17–25 | 24–26 | 20–25 | | | 61–76 | P2 P3 |

=== Final round ===
==== Bracket ====
Quarterfinals
31 July
Mexico | 3
Guatemala | 0
31 July
Colombia | 3
Venezuela | 2

Semifinals
1 August
Mexico | 1
Puerto Rico | 3
1 August
Colombia | 3
Cuba | 2

Final
2 August
Puerto Rico | 3
Colombia | 0
Third place
2 August
Mexico | 3
Cuba | 2

5–8th place semifinals
1 August
Venezuela | 3
Trinidad and Tobago | 0
1 August
Guatemala | 0
Dominican Republic | 3

5th place
2 August
Venezuela | 3
Dominican Republic | 0
7th place
2 August
Trinidad and Tobago | 1
Guatemala | 3

==== Quarterfinals ====
| Date | Time | | Score | | Set 1 | Set 2 | Set 3 | Set 4 | Set 5 | Total | Report |
|---|---|---|---|---|---|---|---|---|---|---|---|
| 31 Jul | 19:00 | Mexico | 3–0 | Guatemala | 25–12 | 25–15 | 25–11 | | | 75–38 | P2 P3 |
| 31 Jul | 21:00 | Colombia | 3–2 | Venezuela | 23–25 | 25–22 | 26–28 | 26–24 | 15–13 | 115–112 | P2 P3 |

==== 5–8th place semifinals ====
| Date | Time | | Score | | Set 1 | Set 2 | Set 3 | Set 4 | Set 5 | Total | Report |
|---|---|---|---|---|---|---|---|---|---|---|---|
| 1 Aug | 15:00 | Venezuela | 3–0 | Trinidad and Tobago | 25–16 | 25–16 | 25–17 | | | 75–49 | P2 P3 |
| 1 Aug | 17:00 | Guatemala | 0–3 | Dominican Republic | 19–25 | 19–25 | 20–25 | | | 58–75 | P2 P3 |

==== 7th place match ====
| Date | Time | | Score | | Set 1 | Set 2 | Set 3 | Set 4 | Set 5 | Total | Report |
|---|---|---|---|---|---|---|---|---|---|---|---|
| 2 Aug | 12:00 | Trinidad and Tobago | 1–3 | Guatemala | 22–25 | 25–27 | 25–23 | 17–25 | | 89–100 | P2 P3 |

==== 5th place match ====
| Date | Time | | Score | | Set 1 | Set 2 | Set 3 | Set 4 | Set 5 | Total | Report |
|---|---|---|---|---|---|---|---|---|---|---|---|
| 2 Aug | 14:30 | Venezuela | 3–0 | Dominican Republic | 25–17 | 25–20 | 25–11 | | | 75–48 | P2 P3 |

==== Semifinals ====
| Date | Time | | Score | | Set 1 | Set 2 | Set 3 | Set 4 | Set 5 | Total | Report |
|---|---|---|---|---|---|---|---|---|---|---|---|
| 1 Aug | 19:00 | Mexico | 1–3 | Puerto Rico | 29–27 | 23–25 | 15–25 | 22–25 | | 89–102 | P2 P3 |
| 1 Aug | 21:45 | Colombia | 3–2 | Cuba | 20–25 | 25–11 | 20–25 | 30–28 | 23–21 | 118–110 | P2 P3 |

==== Third place match ====
| Date | Time | | Score | | Set 1 | Set 2 | Set 3 | Set 4 | Set 5 | Total | Report |
|---|---|---|---|---|---|---|---|---|---|---|---|
| 2 Aug | 16:05 | Mexico | 3–2 | Cuba | 22–25 | 20–25 | 25–23 | 25–22 | 15–8 | 107–103 | P2 P3 |

==== Final ====
| Date | Time | | Score | | Set 1 | Set 2 | Set 3 | Set 4 | Set 5 | Total | Report |
|---|---|---|---|---|---|---|---|---|---|---|---|
| 2 Aug | 19:10 | Puerto Rico | 3–0 | Colombia | 25–14 | 25–21 | 25–14 | | | 75–49 | P2 P3 |

=== Final standings ===
| Rank | Team |
|---|---|
| 1st place, gold medalist(s) | Puerto Rico |
| 2nd place, silver medalist(s) | Colombia |
| 3rd place, bronze medalist(s) | Mexico |
| 4 | Cuba |
| 5 | Venezuela |
| 6 | Dominican Republic |
| 7 | Guatemala |
| 8 | Trinidad and Tobago |

=== Individual awards ===
- Most valuable player
  - Sequiel Sánchez (PUR)
- Best scorer
  - Liberman Agámez (COL)
- Best setter
  - Pedro Rangel (MEX)
- Best outside hitters
  - Manuel López (CUB)
  - Sequiel Sánchez (PUR)
- Best opposite
  - Maurice Torres (PUR)
- Best server
  - Maurice Torres (PUR)
- Best middle blockers
  - Marc-Anthony Honoré (TTO)
  - Liván Osoria (CUB)
- Best libero
  - Yonder García (CUB)
- Best digger
  - Yonder García (CUB)
- Best receiver
  - Arnel Cabrera (PUR)

== Women's tournament ==
=== Qualification ===
| Means of qualification | Date | Vacancies | Qualifier |
|---|---|---|---|
| Host country | 11 June 2014 | 1 | Colombia |
| NORCECA Ranking | 31 December 2017 | 6 | Dominican Republic; Puerto Rico; Cuba; Mexico; Trinidad and Tobago; Costa Rica |
| Invitation | | 1 | Venezuela |
| Total | | 8 | |

=== Pools composition ===
| Pool A | Pool B |
|---|---|
| Cuba (25) | Colombia (28) |
| Dominican Republic (9) | Costa Rica (39) |
| Mexico (26) | Puerto Rico (13) |
| Venezuela (113) | Trinidad and Tobago (34) |

=== Preliminary round ===
- All times are local (UTC–5).

==== Pool A ====
| Pos | Team | Pld | W | L | Pts | SPW | SPL | SPR | SW | SL | SR | Qualification |
|---|---|---|---|---|---|---|---|---|---|---|---|---|
| 1 | Dominican Republic | 3 | 3 | 0 | 13 | 271 | 203 | 1.335 | 9 | 2 | 4.500 | Semifinals |
| 2 | Mexico | 3 | 2 | 1 | 9 | 258 | 250 | 1.032 | 7 | 5 | 1.400 | Quarterfinals |
| 3 | Venezuela | 3 | 1 | 2 | 3 | 205 | 268 | 0.765 | 3 | 8 | 0.375 | Quarterfinals |
| 4 | Cuba | 3 | 0 | 3 | 5 | 290 | 303 | 0.957 | 5 | 9 | 0.556 | 5–8th place semifinals |

| Date | Time | | Score | | Set 1 | Set 2 | Set 3 | Set 4 | Set 5 | Total | Report |
|---|---|---|---|---|---|---|---|---|---|---|---|
| 20 Jul | 17:30 | Dominican Republic | 3–0 | Venezuela | 25–11 | 29–27 | 25–11 | | | 79–49 | P2 P3 |
| 20 Jul | 21:10 | Cuba | 2–3 | Mexico | 22–25 | 25–21 | 25–20 | 19–25 | 8–15 | 99–106 | P2 P3 |
| 21 Jul | 15:00 | Venezuela | 0–3 | Mexico | 20–25 | 18–25 | 16–25 | | | 54–75 | P2 P3 |
| 21 Jul | 19:00 | Dominican Republic | 3–1 | Cuba | 25–18 | 25–17 | 20–25 | 25–17 | | 95–77 | P2 P3 |
| 22 Jul | 17:00 | Cuba | 2–3 | Venezuela | 28–30 | 25–18 | 21–25 | 25–12 | 15–17 | 114–102 | P2 P3 |
| 22 Jul | 19:40 | Mexico | 1–3 | Dominican Republic | 25–22 | 16–25 | 19–25 | 17–25 | | 77–97 | P2 P3 |

==== Pool B ====
| Pos | Team | Pld | W | L | Pts | SPW | SPL | SPR | SW | SL | SR | Qualification |
|---|---|---|---|---|---|---|---|---|---|---|---|---|
| 1 | Colombia | 3 | 3 | 0 | 15 | 229 | 159 | 1.440 | 9 | 0 | MAX | Semifinals |
| 2 | Puerto Rico | 3 | 2 | 1 | 9 | 237 | 208 | 1.139 | 6 | 4 | 1.500 | Quarterfinals |
| 3 | Trinidad and Tobago | 3 | 1 | 2 | 6 | 214 | 226 | 0.947 | 4 | 6 | 0.667 | Quarterfinals |
| 4 | Costa Rica | 3 | 0 | 3 | 0 | 138 | 225 | 0.613 | 0 | 9 | 0.000 | 5–8th place semifinals |

| Date | Time | | Score | | Set 1 | Set 2 | Set 3 | Set 4 | Set 5 | Total | Report |
|---|---|---|---|---|---|---|---|---|---|---|---|
| 20 Jul | 15:00 | Puerto Rico | 3–1 | Trinidad and Tobago | 19–25 | 25–17 | 25–16 | 25–20 | | 94–78 | P2 P3 |
| 20 Jul | 19:30 | Colombia | 3–0 | Costa Rica | 25–14 | 25–9 | 25–7 | | | 75–30 | P2 P3 |
| 21 Jul | 17:00 | Costa Rica | 0–3 | Puerto Rico | 17–25 | 14–25 | 20–25 | | | 51–75 | P2 P3 |
| 21 Jul | 21:25 | Colombia | 3–0 | Trinidad and Tobago | 25–22 | 25–19 | 25–20 | | | 75–61 | P2 P3 |
| 22 Jul | 15:00 | Trinidad and Tobago | 3–0 | Costa Rica | 25–18 | 25–23 | 25–16 | | | 75–57 | P2 P3 |
| 22 Jul | 22:15 | Puerto Rico | 0–3 | Colombia | 20–25 | 27–29 | 21–25 | | | 68–79 | P2 P3 |

=== Final round ===
==== Bracket ====
Quarterfinals
23 July
Mexico | 3
Trinidad and Tobago | 1
23 July
Puerto Rico | 3
Venezuela | 0

Semifinals
24 July
Mexico | 1
Colombia | 3
24 July
Puerto Rico | 0
Dominican Republic | 3

Final
25 July
Colombia | 0
Dominican Republic | 3
Third place
25 July
Mexico | 2
Puerto Rico | 3

5–8th place semifinals
24 July
Venezuela | 3
Costa Rica | 0
24 July
Trinidad and Tobago | 3
Cuba | 0

5th place
25 July
Venezuela | 0
Trinidad and Tobago | 3
7th place
25 July
Costa Rica | 1
Cuba | 3

==== Quarterfinals ====
| Date | Time | | Score | | Set 1 | Set 2 | Set 3 | Set 4 | Set 5 | Total | Report |
|---|---|---|---|---|---|---|---|---|---|---|---|
| 23 Jul | 19:00 | Mexico | 3–1 | Trinidad and Tobago | 20–25 | 25–22 | 25–22 | 25–17 | | 95–86 | P2 P3 |
| 23 Jul | 21:35 | Puerto Rico | 3–0 | Venezuela | 25–15 | 25–14 | 25–16 | | | 75–45 | P2 P3 |

==== 5–8th place semifinals ====
| Date | Time | | Score | | Set 1 | Set 2 | Set 3 | Set 4 | Set 5 | Total | Report |
|---|---|---|---|---|---|---|---|---|---|---|---|
| 24 Jul | 15:00 | Venezuela | 3–0 | Costa Rica | 25–15 | 25–12 | 25–13 | | | 75–40 | P2 P3 |
| 24 Jul | 17:00 | Trinidad and Tobago | 3–0 | Cuba | 25–19 | 25–16 | 25–22 | | | 75–57 | P2 P3 |

==== 7th place match ====
| Date | Time | | Score | | Set 1 | Set 2 | Set 3 | Set 4 | Set 5 | Total | Report |
|---|---|---|---|---|---|---|---|---|---|---|---|
| 25 Jul | 15:00 | Costa Rica | 1–3 | Cuba | 19–25 | 13–25 | 25–23 | 12–25 | | 69–98 | P2 P3 |

==== 5th place match ====
| Date | Time | | Score | | Set 1 | Set 2 | Set 3 | Set 4 | Set 5 | Total | Report |
|---|---|---|---|---|---|---|---|---|---|---|---|
| 25 Jul | 17:10 | Venezuela | 0–3 | Trinidad and Tobago | 24–26 | 19–25 | 20–25 | | | 63–76 | P2 P3 |

==== Semifinals ====
| Date | Time | | Score | | Set 1 | Set 2 | Set 3 | Set 4 | Set 5 | Total | Report |
|---|---|---|---|---|---|---|---|---|---|---|---|
| 24 Jul | 19:00 | Mexico | 1–3 | Colombia | 14–25 | 25–23 | 18–25 | 20–25 | | 77–98 | P2 P3 |
| 24 Jul | 21:40 | Puerto Rico | 0–3 | Dominican Republic | 22–25 | 15–25 | 19–25 | | | 56–75 | P2 P3 |

==== Third place match ====
| Date | Time | | Score | | Set 1 | Set 2 | Set 3 | Set 4 | Set 5 | Total | Report |
|---|---|---|---|---|---|---|---|---|---|---|---|
| 25 Jul | 19:10 | Mexico | 2–3 | Puerto Rico | 24–26 | 25–15 | 19–25 | 29–27 | 12–15 | 109–108 | P2 P3 |

==== Final ====
| Date | Time | | Score | | Set 1 | Set 2 | Set 3 | Set 4 | Set 5 | Total | Report |
|---|---|---|---|---|---|---|---|---|---|---|---|
| 25 Jul | 22:30 | Colombia | 0–3 | Dominican Republic | 19–25 | 17–25 | 19–25 | | | 55–75 | P2 P3 |

=== Final standings ===
| Rank | Team |
|---|---|
| 1st place, gold medalist(s) | Dominican Republic |
| 2nd place, silver medalist(s) | Colombia |
| 3rd place, bronze medalist(s) | Puerto Rico |
| 4 | Mexico |
| 5 | Trinidad and Tobago |
| 6 | Venezuela |
| 7 | Cuba |
| 8 | Costa Rica |

=== Individual awards ===
- Most valuable player
  - Prisilla Rivera (DOM)
- Best scorer
  - Andrea Rangel (MEX)
- Best setter
  - María Marín (COL)
- Best outside hitters
  - Channon Thompson (TTO)
  - Amanda Coneo (COL)
- Best opposite
  - Gaila González (DOM)
- Best server
  - Krystle Esdelle (TTO)
- Best middle blockers
  - Sinead Jack (TTO)
  - Lisvel Elisa Eve (DOM)
- Best libero
  - Brenda Castillo (DOM)
- Best digger
  - Brenda Castillo (DOM)
- Best receiver
  - Amanda Coneo (COL)
