= 1956 Men's South American Volleyball Championship =

The 1956 Men's South American Volleyball Championship, the 2nd tournament, took place in 1956 in Montevideo (Uruguay).

== Final positions ==
Place	Team
	Brazil
	Uruguay
	Paraguay
4	Peru
5	Chile

Source: Todor66.com
