= Volleyball at the 2010 South American Games =

- Venue: Coliseo de Envigado, Coliseo Yesid Santos
- Dates: March 20-29

Volleyball at the 2010 South American Games in Medellín was held from March 20 to March 29. All games were played at Coliseo de Envigado, Coliseo Yesid Santos.

== Medal summary ==
=== Medal table ===
| Rank | Nation | Gold | Silver | Bronze | Total |
|---|---|---|---|---|---|
| 1 | Argentina (ARG) | 1 | 1 | 0 | 2 |
| 2 | Brazil (BRA) | 1 | 0 | 0 | 1 |
| 3 | Venezuela (VEN) | 0 | 1 | 0 | 1 |
| 4 | Colombia (COL) | 0 | 0 | 1 | 1 |
| 4 | Peru (PER) | 0 | 0 | 1 | 1 |
| Totals (5 entries) | | 2 | 2 | 2 | 6 |

== Men ==
=== Group stage ===
==== Group A ====
| Team | W | L | Pts |
|---|---|---|---|
| Venezuela | 2 | 0 | 4 |
| Chile | 1 | 1 | 2 |
| Brazil | 0 | 2 | 0 |

| 20-03-2010 | Brazil | 1–3 | Chile | Coliseo de Envigado, Coliseo Yesid Santos |

| 21-03-2010 | Brazil | 0–3 | Venezuela | Coliseo de Envigado, Coliseo Yesid Santos |

| 22-03-2010 | Venezuela | 3–2 | Chile | Coliseo de Envigado, Coliseo Yesid Santos |

==== Group B ====
| Team | W | L | Pts |
|---|---|---|---|
| Argentina | 3 | 0 | 6 |
| Colombia | 2 | 1 | 4 |
| Peru | 1 | 2 | 2 |
| Ecuador | 0 | 3 | 0 |

| 20-03-2010 | Argentina | 3–0 | Peru | Coliseo de Envigado, Coliseo Yesid Santos |

| 20-03-2010 | Colombia | 3–0 | Ecuador | Coliseo de Envigado, Coliseo Yesid Santos |

| 21-03-2010 | Argentina | 3–0 | Ecuador | Coliseo de Envigado, Coliseo Yesid Santos |

| 21-03-2010 | Colombia | 3–0 | Peru | Coliseo de Envigado, Coliseo Yesid Santos |

| 22-03-2010 | Peru | 3–1 | Ecuador | Coliseo de Envigado, Coliseo Yesid Santos |

| 22-03-2010 | Colombia | 0–3 | Argentina | Coliseo de Envigado, Coliseo Yesid Santos |

=== 5th/6th placement ===
| 23-03-2010 | Brazil | 3–0 | Peru | Coliseo de Envigado, Coliseo Yesid Santos |

=== Semifinals ===
| 23-03-2010 | Argentina | 3–0 | Chile | Coliseo de Envigado, Coliseo Yesid Santos |

| 23-03-2010 | Venezuela | 3–1 | Colombia | Coliseo de Envigado, Coliseo Yesid Santos |

=== Bronze-medal match ===
| 24-03-2010 | Colombia | 3–1 | Chile | Coliseo de Envigado, Coliseo Yesid Santos |

=== Gold-medal match ===
| 24-03-2010 | Argentina | 3–1 | Venezuela | Coliseo de Envigado, Coliseo Yesid Santos |

== Women ==
=== Group stage ===
==== Group A ====
| Team | W | L | Pts |
|---|---|---|---|
| Brazil | 2 | 0 | 4 |
| Colombia | 1 | 1 | 2 |
| Uruguay | 0 | 2 | 0 |

| 25-03-2010 | Brazil | 3–0 | Uruguay | Coliseo de Envigado, Coliseo Yesid Santos |

| 26-03-2010 | Uruguay | 0–3 | Colombia | Coliseo de Envigado, Coliseo Yesid Santos |

| 27-03-2010 | Brazil | 3–0 | Colombia | Coliseo de Envigado, Coliseo Yesid Santos |

==== Group B ====
| Team | W | L | Pts |
|---|---|---|---|
| Argentina | 3 | 0 | 6 |
| Peru | 2 | 1 | 4 |
| Venezuela | 1 | 2 | 2 |
| Chile | 0 | 3 | 0 |

| 25-03-2010 | Peru | 3–0 | Chile | Coliseo de Envigado, Coliseo Yesid Santos |

| 25-03-2010 | Argentina | 3–0 | Venezuela | Coliseo de Envigado, Coliseo Yesid Santos |

| 26-03-2010 | Argentina | 3–0 | Chile | Coliseo de Envigado, Coliseo Yesid Santos |

| 26-03-2010 | Peru | 3–0 | Venezuela | Coliseo de Envigado, Coliseo Yesid Santos |

| 27-03-2010 | Venezuela | 3–0 | Chile | Coliseo de Envigado, Coliseo Yesid Santos |

| 27-03-2010 | Peru | 2–3 | Argentina | Coliseo de Envigado, Coliseo Yesid Santos |

=== 5th/6th placement ===
| 28-03-2010 | Uruguay | 0–3 | Venezuela | Coliseo de Envigado, Coliseo Yesid Santos |

=== Semifinals ===
| 28-03-2010 | Brazil | 3–0 | Peru | Coliseo de Envigado, Coliseo Yesid Santos |

| 28-03-2010 | Argentina | 3–1 | Colombia | Coliseo de Envigado, Coliseo Yesid Santos |

=== Bronze-medal match ===
| 29-03-2010 | Peru | 3–0 | Colombia | Coliseo de Envigado, Coliseo Yesid Santos |

=== Gold-medal match ===
| 29-03-2010 | Brazil | 3–0 | Argentina | Coliseo de Envigado, Coliseo Yesid Santos |
