= Sinead Jack =

Turkish volleyball player (born 1993)

Sinead Jack-Kısal
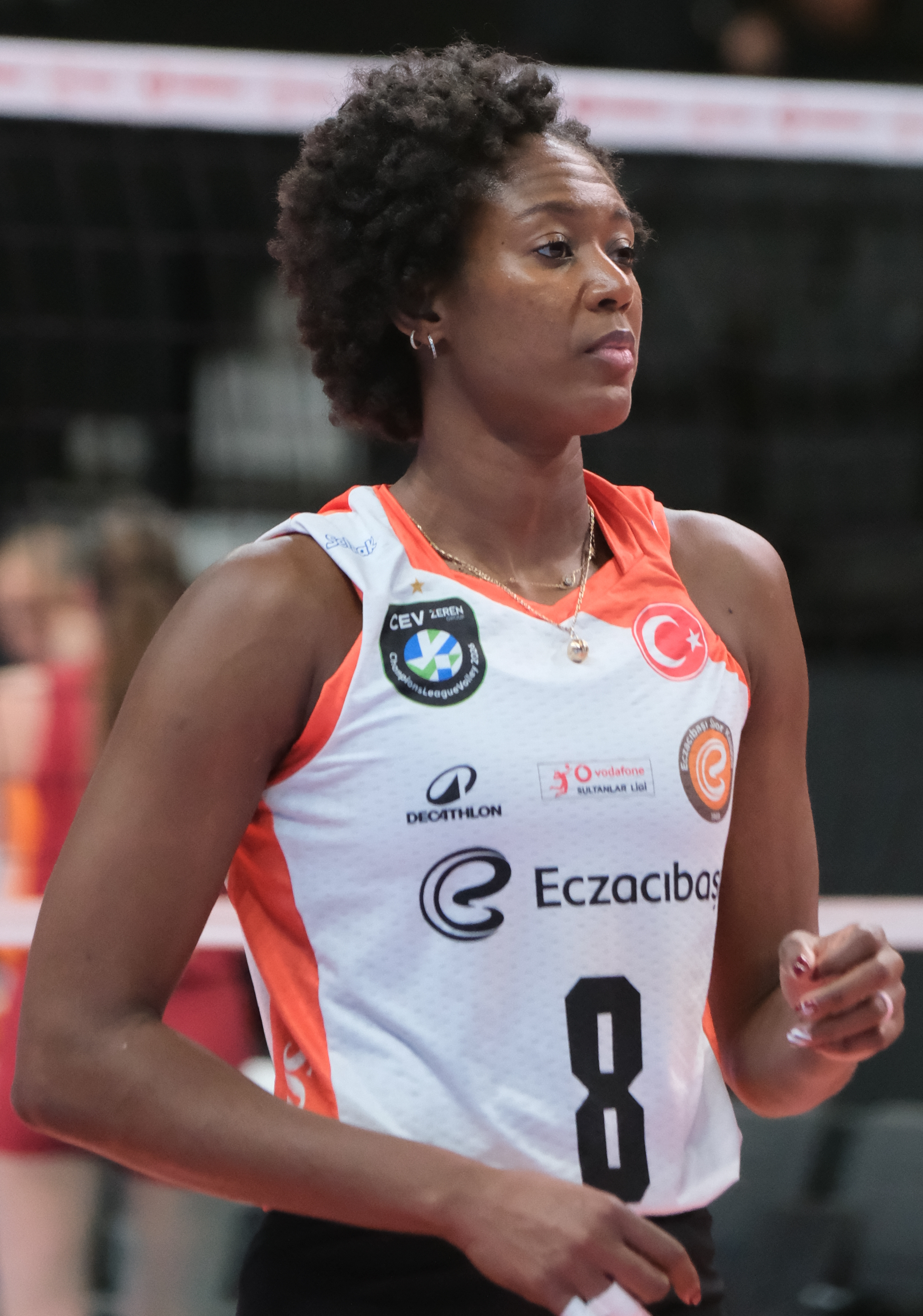
- Jack-Kısal in 2025

Personal information
- Full name: Sinead Jack Kısal
- Nationality: Trinidad and Tobago; Turkish (from 2019)
- Born: Sinead Jack; 8 November 1993 (age 32); San Juan, Trinidad and Tobago
- Height: 1.98 m (6 ft 6 in)
- Weight: 83 kg (183 lb)
- Spike: 324 cm (128 in)
- Block: 314 cm (124 in)

Volleyball information
- Position: Middle blocker
- Current club: Fenerbahçe
- Number: 88

Career
Years	Teams
2010–2013	AZS Białystok
2013–2016	VC Uralochka-NTMK
2016–2018	Galatasaray
2018–2020	Denso Airybees
2020–2021	İlbank
2021	Chemik Police
2021–2022	Megabox Volley Vallefoglia
2022–2026	Eczacıbaşı Dynavit
2026–	Fenerbahçe

National team
2011–2018	Trinidad and Tobago
2025–	Turkey
Honours
Women's volleyball
Representing Turkey
FIVB World Championship
Silver medal – second place	2025 Thailand	Team
FIVB Nations League
Gold medal – first place	2026 Macau	Team
European Championship
Gold medal – first place	2026 Azerbaijan/Czech Republic/Sweden/Turkey	Team

Sinead Jack Kısal (born Sinead Jack, 8 November 1993) is a professional volleyball player who plays as a middle blocker for Sultans League club Fenerbahçe. Born in Trinidad and Tobago, she plays for the Turkey national team. She is a former Trinidad and Tobago international.

== Personal life ==
Sinead Jack was born in Trinidad and Tobago on 8 November 1993. On 8 August 2019, she married Turkish volleyball player Murathan Kısal (born 22 November 1989), and gained Turkish citizenship.

== Club career ==
She is 1.96 m (6 ft 5 in) and plays in the middle blocker position.

After starting her sports career in Trinidad and Tobago, Sinead Jack made her first professional signing with the Polish team AZS Białystok in 2010. Later, she took part in the squad of Uralochka-NTMK in Russia (2013-2016). For the 2016–17 season, she signed with the Turkish club Galatasaray in Istanbul. Due to her significant contribution to the team's success, her contract was extended for one year in July 2017. Later, she was with Denso Airybees in Japan (2018-2020), İlbank in Turkey (2020-2021), Chemik Police in Poland (2020-2021) and Megabox Del Savio Vallefoglia in Italy (2021-2022), respectively. In 2022, she transferred to Eczacıbaşı in Turkey.

In 2026, in her final season with Eczacıbaşı Jack-Kısal won a silver medal in the 2026 Champions League 2025–26 CEV Women's Champions League and was named Best Middle Blocker.

She has signed with Fenerbahçe for the 2026/2027 season.

== International career ==
=== Trinidad and Tobago ===
Playing for the Trinidad and Tobago women's national volleyball team, she participated at the 2011 Women's Pan-American Volleyball Cup. Jack won the 2013 NORCECA Championship Best Middle Blocker award. She won the 2017 Pan-American Cup Best Middle Blocker award, and the same award in the 2018 Central American and Caribbean Games.

=== Türkiye ===
In January 2025, the Turkish Volleyball Federation stated that Jack Kısal will be eligible to play for the Turkey women's national volleyball team due to her Turkish citizenship obtained by marriage years ago. In April 2025, she was selected to the Türkiye national team for the 2025 FIVB Women's Volleyball Nations League.

== Awards ==
=== Clubs ===
- 2016-17 Turkish League - Runner-Up, with Galatasaray

=== Individuals ===
- 2013 NORCECA Championship "Best Middle Blocker"
- 2017 Pan-American Cup "Best Middle Blocker"
- 2018 Central American and Caribbean Games "Best Middle Blocker"
