= 1961 Men's South American Volleyball Championship =

The 1961 Men's South American Volleyball Championship, the 4th tournament, took place in 1961 in Lima (Peru).

== Final positions ==
Place	Team
	Brazil
	Argentina
	Peru
4	Colombia
