= 2013 Men's South American Volleyball Championship =

2013 Men's South American Championship
Tournament details
- Host country: Brazil
- Dates: 6–10 August
- Teams: 5
- Venue: 1 (in 1 host city)

Final positions
- Champions: Brazil (29th title)

Tournament awards
- MVP: (Brazil) Sidnei Santos

The 2013 Men's South American Volleyball Championship was the 30th edition of the tournament, organised by CSV. It was held in Cabo Frio, Brazil from 6 to 10 August 2013. The top two teams qualified for the 2014 World Championship and the champions also qualified for the 2013 World Grand Champions Cup.

Initially, format of the tournament was two pools of three teams with semifinals and final. But, CSV changed format to five-team round-robin after Venezuela withdrew.

== Teams ==
- Brazil (Hosts)
- Argentina
- Chile
- Colombia
- Paraguay

== Venue ==
All matches
Cabo Frio, Brazil
Ginásio Poliesportivo Alfredo Barreto
Capacity: 3,200

== Pool standing procedure ==
1. Match points
2. Number of matches won
3. Sets ratio
4. Points ratio
5. Result of the last match between the tied teams

Match won 3–0 or 3–1: 3 match points for the winner, 0 match points for the loser
Match won 3–2: 2 match points for the winner, 1 match point for the loser

== Round robin ==
- All times are Brasília Time (UTC−03:00).

Pos	Team	Pld	W	L	Pts	SW	SL	SR	SPW	SPL	SPR
1	Brazil	4	4	0	11	12	2	6.000	333	221	1.507
2	Argentina	4	3	1	10	11	3	3.667	325	244	1.332
3	Colombia	4	2	2	5	6	8	0.750	272	306	0.889
4	Chile	4	1	3	4	5	10	0.500	312	341	0.915
5	Paraguay	4	0	4	0	1	12	0.083	192	322	0.596

Date	Time		Score		Set 1	Set 2	Set 3	Set 4	Set 5	Total	Report
06 Aug	17:35	Argentina	3–0	Chile	25–20	25–12	25–23			75–55	P2
06 Aug	20:30	Brazil	3–0	Paraguay	25–7	25–9	25–5			75–21	P2
07 Aug	17:35	Chile	3–1	Paraguay	22–25	25–16	25–20	25–21		97–82	P2
07 Aug	20:35	Brazil	3–0	Colombia	25–15	25–18	25–12			75–45	P2
08 Aug	17:35	Colombia	3–2	Chile	18–25	25–17	23–25	25–22	18–16	109–105	P2
08 Aug	20:50	Argentina	3–0	Paraguay	25–13	25–10	25–15			75–38	P2
09 Aug	17:37	Argentina	3–0	Colombia	25–17	25–9	25–17			75–43	P2
09 Aug	20:33	Brazil	3–0	Chile	25–19	25–19	25–17			75–55	P2
10 Aug	18:47	Colombia	3–0	Paraguay	25–23	25–13	25–15			75–51	P2
10 Aug	21:45	Brazil	3–2	Argentina	19–25	25–20	25–19	24–26	15–10	108–100	P2

== Final standing ==
Rank	Team
1st place, gold medalist(s)	Brazil
2nd place, silver medalist(s)	Argentina
3rd place, bronze medalist(s)	Colombia
4	Chile
5	Paraguay

Qualified for the 2014 World Championship and the 2013 World Grand Champions Cup
Qualified for the 2014 World Championship

2013 Men's South American champions

Brazil
29th title

14–man roster
Bruno (c), Wallace, Sidão, Vissotto, William, Lucarelli, Alan, Lipe, M. Souza, Renan, Lucas, Dante, Mario Jr., Maurício
Head coach
Bernardinho

== Awards ==
- Most valuable player
  (Brazil) Sidnei Santos
- Best setter
  (Brazil) Bruno Rezende
- Best outside spikers
  (Brazil) Ricardo Lucarelli Souza
  (Argentina) Rodrigo Quiroga
- Best middle blockers
  (Brazil) Sidnei Santos
  (Argentina) Sebastian Solé
- Best opposite spiker
  (Colombia) Alexander Moreno
- Best libero
  (Brazil) Mario Pedreira
