= Sequiel Sánchez =

Puerto Rican volleyball player (born 1990)

Sequiel Sanchez

Personal information
- Nationality: Puerto Rico
- Born: 24 March 1990 (age 36); San Sebastián, Puerto Rico
- Height: 182 cm (6 ft 0 in)
- Weight: 83 kg (183 lb)
- Spike: 290 cm (114 in)
- Block: 275 cm (108 in)

Volleyball information
- Number: 11

Career
Years	Teams
2014	Guaynabo Mets

National team
2008-2011	Puerto Rico

Sequiel Sanchez (born 24 March 1990) is a Puerto Rican male volleyball player. With his club Guaynabo Mets he competed at the 2014 FIVB Volleyball Men's Club World Championship.

== Achievements ==
=== Puerto Rican national team ===
Team

- 2014 Central American and Caribbean Games: Runner-up
- 2017 Men's Pan-American Volleyball Cup: Runner-up
- 2018 Central American and Caribbean Games; Champion

Individual

- 2018 Central American and Caribbean Games: Second Best Spiker
- 2018 Central American and Caribbean Games; Most Valuable Player
