= Volleyball at the Pan American Games =

- No. of events: 2 (men: 1; women: 1)

Volleyball for both men and women has been played at the Pan American Games since 1955, when the second edition of the multi-sports event was staged in Mexico City.

== Men's tournament ==
Pan American Games
Year	Host	Gold	Silver	Bronze	4th Place
1955; Details	Mexico City, Mexico	United States	Mexico	Brazil	Dominican Republic
1959; Details	Chicago, United States	United States	Brazil	Mexico	Dominican Republic
1963; Details	São Paulo, Brazil	Brazil	United States	Argentina	Chile
1967; Details	Winnipeg, Canada	United States	Brazil	Cuba	Mexico
1971; Details	Cali, Colombia	Cuba	United States	Brazil	Venezuela
1975; Details	Mexico City, Mexico	Cuba	Brazil	Mexico	United States
1979; Details	San Juan, Puerto Rico	Cuba	Brazil	Canada	Mexico
1983; Details	Caracas, Venezuela	Brazil	Cuba	Argentina	United States
1987; Details	Indianapolis, United States	United States	Cuba	Brazil	Argentina
1991; Details	Havana, Cuba	Cuba	Brazil	Argentina	United States
1995; Details	Mar del Plata, Argentina	Argentina	United States	Cuba	Venezuela
1999; Details	Winnipeg, Canada	Cuba	Brazil	Canada	Argentina
2003; Details	(Dominican Republic); Santo Domingo, Dominican R.	Venezuela	Cuba	Brazil	United States
2007; Details	Rio de Janeiro, Brazil	Brazil	United States	Cuba	Venezuela
2011; Details	Guadalajara, Mexico	Brazil	Cuba	Argentina	Mexico
2015; Details	Toronto, Canada	Argentina	Brazil	Canada	Puerto Rico
2019; Details	Lima, Peru	Argentina	Cuba	Brazil	Chile
2023; Details	Santiago, Chile	Brazil	Argentina	Colombia	Cuba

=== MVP by edition ===
- 1955 – 1999 – Unknown
- 2003 – (Venezuela) Ernardo Gómez
- 2007 – (Brazil) Gilberto Godoy
- 2011 – (Cuba) Wilfredo León
- 2015 – (Argentina) Facundo Conte
- 2019 – (Argentina) Nicolás Bruno
- 2023 – (Brazil) Henrique Honorato

== Women's tournament ==
Pan American Games
Year	Host	Gold	Silver	Bronze	4th Place
1955; Details	Mexico City, Mexico	Mexico	United States	Brazil	Dominican Republic
1959; Details	Chicago, United States	Brazil	United States	Peru	Puerto Rico
1963; Details	São Paulo, Brazil	Brazil	United States	Mexico	Peru
1967; Details	Winnipeg, Canada	United States	Peru	Cuba	Brazil
1971; Details	Cali, Colombia	Cuba	Peru	Mexico	Brazil
1975; Details	Mexico City, Mexico	Cuba	Peru	Mexico	Canada
1979; Details	San Juan, Puerto Rico	Cuba	Peru	Brazil	United States
1983; Details	Caracas, Venezuela	Cuba	United States	Peru	Brazil
1987; Details	Indianapolis, United States	Cuba	Peru	United States	Brazil
1991; Details	Havana, Cuba	Cuba	Brazil	Peru	Canada
1995; Details	Mar del Plata, Argentina	Cuba	United States	Canada	Argentina
1999; Details	Winnipeg, Canada	Brazil	Cuba	United States	Dominican Republic
2003; Details	(Dominican Republic); Santo Domingo, Dominican R.	Dominican Republic	Cuba	United States	Brazil
2007; Details	Rio de Janeiro, Brazil	Cuba	Brazil	United States	Peru
2011; Details	Guadalajara, Mexico	Brazil	Cuba	United States	Dominican Republic
2015; Details	Toronto, Canada	United States	Brazil	Dominican Republic	Puerto Rico
2019; Details	Lima, Peru	Dominican Republic	Colombia	Argentina	Brazil
2023; Details	Santiago, Chile	Dominican Republic	Brazil	Mexico	Argentina

=== MVP by edition ===
- 1955 – 1999 – Unknown
- 2003 – (Dominican Republic) Yudelkys Bautista
- 2007 – (Cuba) Nancy Carrillo
- 2011 – (Cuba) Yoana Palacio
- 2015 – (United States) Carli Lloyd
- 2019 – (Dominican Republic) Bethania de la Cruz
- 2023 – (Dominican Republic) Niverka Marte

== Medal table ==
Rank	Nation	Gold	Silver	Bronze	Total
1	Cuba	13	8	4	25
2	Brazil	9	11	7	27
3	United States	6	9	5	20
4	Argentina	3	1	5	9
5	Dominican Republic	3	0	1	4
6	Mexico	1	1	6	8
7	Venezuela	1	0	0	1
8	Peru	0	5	3	8
9	Colombia	0	1	1	2
10	Canada	0	0	4	4
Totals (10 entries)		36	36	36	108

== See also ==
- Volleyball at the Junior Pan American Games
