= Men's South American Volleyball Championship =

Volleyball tournament

- Upcoming season or competition: 2026 Men's South American Volleyball Championship
- Sport: Volleyball
- Founded: 1951
- No. of teams: 6 (Finals)
- Continent: South America (CSV)
- Most recent champion: Brazil (34th title)
- Most titles: Brazil (34 titles)

The Men's South American Volleyball Championship is the official competition for senior men's national volleyball teams of South America, organized by the Confederación Sudamericana de Voleibol (CSV). The initial gap between championships was variable, but since 1967 they have been awarded every two years. The competition has been dominated by Brazil, which won 34 of the 36 editions. The first tournament not won by Brazil was the 1964 championship, when the team did not compete due to political turmoil in the country, and the tournament was won by Argentina. Recently, in the 2023 edition, Argentina won their second title, ending Brazil's dominance since 1967.

== History ==
Year	Host	Final			3rd place match			Teams
Year	Host	Champions	Score	Runners-up	3rd place	Score	4th place	Teams
1951; Details	(Brazil); Rio de Janeiro	Brazil	Round-robin	Uruguay	Peru	Round-robin	Argentina	4
1956; Details	(Uruguay); Montevideo	Brazil	Round-robin	Uruguay	Paraguay	Round-robin	Peru	5
1958; Details	(Brazil); Porto Alegre	Brazil	Round-robin	Paraguay	Uruguay	Round-robin	Argentina	5
1961; Details	(Peru); Lima	Brazil	Round-robin	Chile	Argentina	Round-robin	Peru	5
1962; Details	(Chile); Santiago	Brazil	Round-robin	Argentina	Venezuela	Round-robin	Paraguay	7
1964; Details	(Argentina); Buenos Aires	Argentina	Round-robin	Venezuela	Uruguay	Round-robin	Paraguay	5
1967; Details	(Brazil); Santos	Brazil	Round-robin	Venezuela	Chile	Round-robin	Uruguay	5
1969; Details	(Venezuela); Caracas	Brazil	Round-robin	Venezuela	Uruguay	Round-robin	Chile	8
1971; Details	(Uruguay); Montevideo	Brazil	Round-robin	Uruguay	Argentina	Round-robin	Chile	8
1973; Details	(Colombia); Bucaramanga	Brazil	Round-robin	Argentina	Venezuela	Round-robin	Chile	5
1975; Details	(Paraguay); Asunción	Brazil	Round-robin	Venezuela	Argentina	Round-robin	Uruguay	8
1977; Details	(Peru); Chiclayo / Lima / Trujillo	Brazil	Round-robin	Venezuela	Argentina	Round-robin	Peru	7
1979; Details	(Argentina); Rosario	Brazil	Round-robin	Venezuela	Paraguay	Round-robin	Chile	7
1981; Details	(Chile); Santiago	Brazil	Round-robin	Argentina	Chile	Round-robin	Venezuela	6
1983; Details	(Brazil); São Paulo	Brazil	Round-robin	Argentina	Chile	Round-robin	Venezuela	7
1985; Details	(Venezuela); Caracas	Brazil	Round-robin	Venezuela	Argentina	Round-robin	Uruguay	6
1987; Details	(Uruguay); Montevideo	Brazil	Round-robin	Argentina	Venezuela	Round-robin	Paraguay	7
1989; Details	(Brazil); Curitiba	Brazil	Round-robin	Argentina	Venezuela	Round-robin	Peru	7
1991; Details	(Brazil); Osasco	Brazil	3–1	Argentina	Venezuela	Round-robin	Peru	7
1993; Details	(Argentina); Córdoba	Brazil	3–2	Argentina	Chile	Round-robin	Venezuela	6
1995; Details	(Brazil); Porto Alegre	Brazil	3–1	Argentina	Venezuela	3–0	Chile	8
1997; Details	(Venezuela); Caracas	Brazil	3–0	Venezuela	Argentina	Round-robin	Peru	4 / 10
1999; Details	(Argentina); Córdoba	Brazil	3–1	Argentina	Venezuela	3–0	Uruguay	4 / 9
2001; Details	(Colombia); Cali	Brazil	Round-robin	Argentina	Venezuela	Round-robin	Colombia	4 / 9
2003; Details	(Brazil); Rio de Janeiro	Brazil	Round-robin	Venezuela	Argentina	Round-robin	Chile	5
2005; Details	(Brazil); Lages	Brazil	Round-robin	Argentina	Venezuela	Round-robin	Colombia	6
2007; Details	(Chile); Santiago / Viña del Mar	Brazil	3–0	Argentina	Venezuela	3–1	Chile	8
2009; Details	(Colombia); Bogotá	Brazil	Round-robin	Argentina	Venezuela	Round-robin	Colombia	7
2011; Details	(Brazil); Cuiabá	Brazil	Round-robin	Argentina	Venezuela	Round-robin	Colombia	7
2013; Details	(Brazil); Cabo Frio	Brazil	Round-robin	Argentina	Colombia	Round-robin	Chile	5
2015; Details	(Brazil); Maceió	Brazil	3–0	Argentina	Colombia	3–0	Venezuela	8
2017; Details	(Chile); Santiago / Temuco	Brazil	3–0	Venezuela	Argentina	3–0	Chile	8
2019; Details	(Chile); Santiago	Brazil	3–2	Argentina	Chile	3–0	Venezuela	8
2021; Details	(Brazil); Brasília	Brazil	Round-robin	Argentina	Chile	Round-robin	Colombia	5
2023; Details	(Brazil); Recife	Argentina	Round-robin	Brazil	Colombia	Round-robin	Chile	5
2026; Details	(Brazil); Rio de Janeiro	Brazil	Round-robin	Argentina	Chile	Round-robin	Colombia	6

== Medals summary ==
Rank	Nation	Gold	Silver	Bronze	Total
1	Brazil	34	1	0	35
2	Argentina	2	20	8	30
3	Venezuela	0	10	12	22
4	Uruguay	0	3	3	6
5	Chile	0	1	7	8
6	Paraguay	0	1	2	3
7	Colombia	0	0	3	3
8	Peru	0	0	1	1
Totals (8 entries)		36	36	36	108

== Most valuable player by edition ==
- 1951–2005 – Unknown
- 2007 – Gilberto Godoy Filho (BRA)
- 2009 – Murilo Endres (BRA)
- 2011 – Sérgio Santos (BRA)
- 2013 – Sidnei Santos (BRA)
- 2015 – (Brazil) Sérgio Santos (2)
- 2017 – Maurício Borges Silva (BRA)
- 2019 – Alan Souza (BRA)
- 2021 – Bruno Rezende (BRA)
- 2023 – Luciano Vicentín (ARG)
- 2026 – Ricardo Lucarelli (BRA)

== See also ==
- South American Women's Volleyball Championship
- Men's U23 South American Volleyball Championship
- Men's Junior South American Volleyball Championship
- Boys' Youth South American Volleyball Championship
- Boys' U17 South American Volleyball Championship
- Volleyball at the Pan American Games
- Men's Pan-American Volleyball Cup
