= Héctor Salerno =

Venezuelan volleyball player (born 1991)

Personal information
- Nationality: Venezuelan
- Born: 18 June 1991 (age 35)
- Height: 1.96 m (6 ft 5 in)
- Weight: 88 kg (194 lb)
- Spike: 358 cm (141 in)
- Block: 351 cm (138 in)

Volleyball information
- Position: Punta/Receptlr
- Number: 05

National team
Venezuela

Héctor Salerno (born 18 June 1991) is a Venezuelan male volleyball player. He was part of the Venezuela men's national volleyball team at the 2014 FIVB Volleyball Men's World Championship in Poland. He played with Aragua VC.

== Clubs ==
- Aragua VC (2014)
