= Volleyball at the 2022 Bolivarian Games =

Volleyball competitions at the 2022 Bolivarian Games

- Volleyball pictogram
- Venue: Coliseo Cubierto Julio Monsalvo Castilla
- Dates: 24 June – 5 July 2022
- Competitors: 128 from 6 nations
- Teams: 11 (6 men and 5 women)

Volleyball competitions at the 2022 Bolivarian Games in Valledupar, Colombia were held from 24 June to 5 July 2022 at Coliseo Cubierto Julio Monsalvo Castilla.

Two medal events were scheduled to be contested: a men's and women's tournament. A total of 132 athletes (72 athletes–6 teams for men and 60 athletes–5 teams for women) competed in the events. Both tournaments were restricted to under-23 players.

Venezuela and Dominican Republic were the defending men's and women's gold medalists, respectively. Colombia won the gold medal in both men and women tournaments.

== Participating nations ==
A total of 6 nations (5 ODEBO nations and 1 invited) registered teams for the volleyball events. Each nation was able to enter a maximum of 24 athletes (one team of 12 athletes per gender). Hosts Colombia, Dominican Republic, Peru, Venezuela and Bolivia participated in both events while Chile only participated in the men's tournament.

- Bolivia (20 athletes)
- Chile (12)
- Colombia (24)
- Dominican Republic (24)
- Peru (24)
- Venezuela (24)

== Medal summary ==
=== Medal table ===
* Host nation (Host nation)

Rank	Nation	Gold	Silver	Bronze	Total
1	Colombia*	2	0	0	2
2	Chile	0	1	0	1
2	Dominican Republic	0	1	0	1
4	Peru	0	0	2	2
Totals (4 entries)		2	2	2	6

=== Medalists ===
Event	Gold	Silver	Bronze
Men's tournament	Colombia (COL); Cristian Murillo; Marlon Mendoza; Oliver Murillo; Miguel Ángel Martínez; Leiner Aponzá; Juan Estupiñán; Samuel Jaramillo; Daniel Medina; Roosvuelt Ramos; Daniel Aponza; John Cuello; Santiago Ruiz	Chile (CHI); Martín Collao; Guillermo Urra; Horacio Gutierrez; Kaj Bonacic; Vicente Valenzuela; Samuel Díaz; Jorge Orrego; Matías Jadue; Vicente Arancibia; Rafael Fuentes; Jaime Bravo; Yordan Araya	Peru (PER); Jassir Morón; Santiago La Jara; Martín Gómez; Hiroshi La Torre; Ángel Cerpa; Sebastián Blanco; Leonel Despaigne; Piero Porras; Sebastián Thiermann; Favián Del Aguila; Bruno Seminario; Randal Carrasco
Women's tournament	Colombia (COL); Darlevis Mosquera; Nathalia Borrero; Laura Grajales; Ana Olaya; Valerin Carabalí; Laura Zapata; Maria Caycedo; Genesis Rodríguez; Jazmín Vergara; Angie Velásquez; Sofía Cuartas; Kenia Mendoza	Dominican Republic (DOM); Yaneirys Rodríguez; Iliana Rodríguez; Camila De La Rosa; Madeline Guillén; Natalia Martínez; Ailyn Liberato; Ariana Rodríguez; Alondra Tapia; Alanae Margaritha; Esthefany Rabit; Seliann Concepción; Romina Cornelio	Peru (PER); Estefany Mariñas; Alisson Alarcón; Alondra Alarcón; Jade Rodríguez; Maria Fernanda Cisneros; Saskya Silvano; Maria José Rojas; Maria Fernanda Denegri; Antuanette Arteaga; Lizanyela López; Jade Cuya; Ximena Ingaruca

== Venue ==
All matches in both events will be played at Coliseo Cubierto Julio Monsalvo Castilla in Valledupar, with a capacity for 20,000 spectators.

== Men's tournament ==
2022 Bolivarian Games Men's Volleyball tournament
Tournament details
- Host country: Colombia
- City: Valledupar
- Dates: 24–28 June 2022
- Teams: 6 (from 2 confederations)
- Venue: 1 (in 1 host city)

Final positions
- Champions: Colombia (2nd title)
- Runners-up: Chile
- Third place: Peru
- Fourth place: Dominican Republic

The men's tournament was held from 24 to 28 June 2022 and consisted of a group stage and a final stage.

All match times are in COT (UTC−5).

=== Group stage ===
The group stage consisted of two groups of 3 teams, each group was played under round-robin format with the top two teams progressing to the semi-finals.

==== Pool A ====
Pos	Team	Pld	W	L	Pts	SW	SL	SR	SPW	SPL	SPR	Qualification
1	Colombia (H)	2	2	0	4	6	0	MAX	150	106	1.415	Semi-finals
2	Peru	2	1	1	3	3	4	0.750	146	166	0.880	Semi-finals
3	Venezuela	2	0	2	2	1	6	0.167	147	171	0.860	5th–6th place match

Source: Bolivarianos Valledupar 2022
(H) Host

24 June 2022; 13:00	Peru	3–1	Venezuela	Coliseo Cubierto Julio Monsalvo Castilla; Referees: Edwin López (COL), Cristian Herrera (CHI)
24 June 2022; 13:00	(25–22, 20–25, 26–24, 25–20); Report			Coliseo Cubierto Julio Monsalvo Castilla; Referees: Edwin López (COL), Cristian Herrera (CHI)

25 June 2022; 20:00	Colombia	3–0	Venezuela	Coliseo Cubierto Julio Monsalvo Castilla; Referees: Cristian Herrera (CHI), Jorge Nazario (PER)
25 June 2022; 20:00	(25–23, 25–15, 25–18); Report			Coliseo Cubierto Julio Monsalvo Castilla; Referees: Cristian Herrera (CHI), Jorge Nazario (PER)

26 June 2022; 20:40	Colombia	3–0	Peru	Coliseo Cubierto Julio Monsalvo Castilla; Referees: Cristian Herrera (CHI), Brian Noroño (VEN)
26 June 2022; 20:40	(25–17, 25–10, 25–23); Report			Coliseo Cubierto Julio Monsalvo Castilla; Referees: Cristian Herrera (CHI), Brian Noroño (VEN)

==== Pool B ====
Pos	Team	Pld	W	L	Pts	SW	SL	SR	SPW	SPL	SPR	Qualification
1	Chile	2	2	0	4	6	2	3.000	193	169	1.142	Semi-finals
2	Dominican Republic	2	1	1	3	5	5	1.000	218	222	0.982	Semi-finals
3	Bolivia	2	0	2	2	2	6	0.333	160	180	0.889	5th–6th place match

Source: Bolivarianos Valledupar 2022

24 June 2022; 11:00	Chile	3–0	Bolivia	Coliseo Cubierto Julio Monsalvo Castilla; Referees: Brayan Noroño (VEN), Jorge Nazario (PER)
24 June 2022; 11:00	(25–21, 25–19, 25–16); Report			Coliseo Cubierto Julio Monsalvo Castilla; Referees: Brayan Noroño (VEN), Jorge Nazario (PER)

25 June 2022; 17:00	Dominican Republic	3–2	Bolivia	Coliseo Cubierto Julio Monsalvo Castilla; Referees: Edwin López (COL), Jorge Nazario (PER)
25 June 2022; 17:00	(25–19, 21–25, 19–25, 25–23, 15–12); Report			Coliseo Cubierto Julio Monsalvo Castilla; Referees: Edwin López (COL), Jorge Nazario (PER)

26 June 2022; 17:00	Dominican Republic	2–3	Chile	Coliseo Cubierto Julio Monsalvo Castilla; Referees: Brayan Noroño (VEN), Edwin López (COL)
26 June 2022; 17:00	(26–24, 20–25, 23–25, 30–28, 14–16); Report			Coliseo Cubierto Julio Monsalvo Castilla; Referees: Brayan Noroño (VEN), Edwin López (COL)

=== Final stage ===
The final stage consisted of the 5th–6th place match (between the third placed teams of pools A and B), the semi-finals and the bronze and gold medal matches. The semi-finals match-ups were:

- Semifinal 1: Winners Pool B v Runners-up Pool A
- Semifinal 2: Winners Pool A v Runners-up Pool B

Winners of semi-finals played the gold medal match, while losers played the bronze medal match.

Semi-finals
Colombia	3
Dominican Republic	1
Chile	3
Peru	2

Gold medal match
Colombia	3
Chile	0
Bronze medal match
Dominican Republic	2
Peru	3

5th–6th place match
Venezuela	3
Bolivia	2

==== Semi-finals ====
27 June 2022; 17:00	Chile	3–2	Peru	Coliseo Cubierto Julio Monsalvo Castilla; Referees: Misael Galindo (COL), Edwin López (COL)
27 June 2022; 17:00	(25–21, 23–25, 23–25, 25–13, 16–14); Report			Coliseo Cubierto Julio Monsalvo Castilla; Referees: Misael Galindo (COL), Edwin López (COL)

27 June 2022; 21:00	Colombia	3–1	Dominican Republic	Coliseo Cubierto Julio Monsalvo Castilla; Referees: Brian Noroño (VEN), Cristian Herrera (CHI)
27 June 2022; 21:00	(25–20, 22–25, 25–18, 26–24); Report			Coliseo Cubierto Julio Monsalvo Castilla; Referees: Brian Noroño (VEN), Cristian Herrera (CHI)

==== 5th–6th place match ====
27 June 2022; 15:00	Venezuela	3–2	Bolivia	Coliseo Cubierto Julio Monsalvo Castilla; Referees: Cristian Herrera (CHI), Jorge Nazario (PER)
27 June 2022; 15:00	(31–33, 25–18, 24–26, 25–22, 15–11); Report			Coliseo Cubierto Julio Monsalvo Castilla; Referees: Cristian Herrera (CHI), Jorge Nazario (PER)

==== Bronze medal match ====
28 June 2022; 17:00	Dominican Republic	2–3	Peru	Coliseo Cubierto Julio Monsalvo Castilla; Referees: Cristian Herrera (CHI), Edwin López (COL)
28 June 2022; 17:00	(22–25, 17–25, 25–19, 25–19, 11–15); Report			Coliseo Cubierto Julio Monsalvo Castilla; Referees: Cristian Herrera (CHI), Edwin López (COL)

==== Gold medal match ====
28 June 2022; 19:00	Colombia	3–0	Chile	Coliseo Cubierto Julio Monsalvo Castilla; Referees: Brian Noroño (VEN), Misael Galindo (COL)
28 June 2022; 19:00	(25–18, 25–20, 25–19); Report			Coliseo Cubierto Julio Monsalvo Castilla; Referees: Brian Noroño (VEN), Misael Galindo (COL)

== Women's tournament ==
Volleyball at the 2022 Bolivarian Games
Tournament details
- Host country: Colombia
- City: Valledupar
- Dates: 1–5 July 2022
- Teams: 5 (from 2 confederations)
- Venue: 1 (in 1 host city)
- Runners-up: Dominican Republic
- Third place: Peru
- Fourth place: Venezuela

The women's tournament was held from 1 to 5 July 2022 and consisted of a single group of 5 teams in which each team played once against the other 4 teams in the group on a single round-robin basis. The top three teams were awarded gold, silver and bronze medals respectively.

=== Standings ===
Pos	Team	Pld	W	L	Pts	SW	SL	SR	SPW	SPL	SPR	Final result
1	Colombia (H)	4	4	0	8	12	2	6.000	326	250	1.304	Gold medal
2	Dominican Republic	4	3	1	7	11	3	3.667	328	214	1.533	Silver medal
3	Peru	4	2	2	6	6	6	1.000	248	237	1.046	Bronze medal
4	Venezuela	4	1	3	5	3	10	0.300	221	312	0.708	Fourth place
5	Bolivia	4	0	4	4	1	12	0.083	212	322	0.658	Fifth place

Source: Bolivarianos Valledupar 2022
(H) Host

=== Matches ===
All match times are in COT (UTC−5).

1 July 2022; 17:00	Dominican Republic	3–0	Venezuela	Coliseo Cubierto Julio Monsalvo Castilla; Referees: Fernando Prieto (COL), Cinthya Martínez (COL)
1 July 2022; 17:00	(25–11, 25–8, 25–13); Report			Coliseo Cubierto Julio Monsalvo Castilla; Referees: Fernando Prieto (COL), Cinthya Martínez (COL)

1 July 2022; 19:00	Colombia	3–0	Bolivia	Coliseo Cubierto Julio Monsalvo Castilla; Referees: Pedro Roa (COL), Consuelo Fuentes (PER)
1 July 2022; 19:00	(25–18, 25–23, 25–9); Report			Coliseo Cubierto Julio Monsalvo Castilla; Referees: Pedro Roa (COL), Consuelo Fuentes (PER)

2 July 2022; 17:00	Peru	3–0	Bolivia	Coliseo Cubierto Julio Monsalvo Castilla; Referees: Cinthya Martínez (COL), Edwin López (COL)
2 July 2022; 17:00	(25–11, 25–14, 25–11); Report			Coliseo Cubierto Julio Monsalvo Castilla; Referees: Cinthya Martínez (COL), Edwin López (COL)

2 July 2022; 19:00	Colombia	3–0	Venezuela	Coliseo Cubierto Julio Monsalvo Castilla; Referees: Consuelo Fuentes (PER), Fernando Prieto (COL)
2 July 2022; 19:00	(25–6, 25–16, 25–19); Report			Coliseo Cubierto Julio Monsalvo Castilla; Referees: Consuelo Fuentes (PER), Fernando Prieto (COL)

3 July 2022; 17:00	Dominican Republic	3–0	Peru	Coliseo Cubierto Julio Monsalvo Castilla; Referees: Fernando Prieto (COL), Pedro Roa (VEN)
3 July 2022; 17:00	(25–14, 25–11, 25–17); Report			Coliseo Cubierto Julio Monsalvo Castilla; Referees: Fernando Prieto (COL), Pedro Roa (VEN)

3 July 2022; 20:00	Venezuela	3–1	Bolivia	Coliseo Cubierto Julio Monsalvo Castilla; Referees: Edwin López (COL), Consuelo Fuentes (PER)
3 July 2022; 20:00	(25–20, 25–21, 22–25, 25–21); Report			Coliseo Cubierto Julio Monsalvo Castilla; Referees: Edwin López (COL), Consuelo Fuentes (PER)

4 July 2022; 17:00	Dominican Republic	3–0	Bolivia	Coliseo Cubierto Julio Monsalvo Castilla; Referees: Cintya Martínez (COL), Consuelo Fuentes (PER)
4 July 2022; 17:00	(25–12, 25–13, 25–14); Report			Coliseo Cubierto Julio Monsalvo Castilla; Referees: Cintya Martínez (COL), Consuelo Fuentes (PER)

4 July 2022; 19:00	Colombia	3–0	Peru	Coliseo Cubierto Julio Monsalvo Castilla; Referees: Pedro Roa (VEN), Edwin López (COL)
4 July 2022; 19:00	(25–18, 25–15, 25–23); Report			Coliseo Cubierto Julio Monsalvo Castilla; Referees: Pedro Roa (VEN), Edwin López (COL)

5 July 2022; 11:00	Peru	3–0	Venezuela	Coliseo Cubierto Julio Monsalvo Castilla; Referees: Ewin López (COL), Cintya Martínez (COL)
5 July 2022; 11:00	(25–15, 25–14, 25–22); Report			Coliseo Cubierto Julio Monsalvo Castilla; Referees: Ewin López (COL), Cintya Martínez (COL)

5 July 2022; 13:00	Colombia	3–2	Dominican Republic	Coliseo Cubierto Julio Monsalvo Castilla; Referees: Pedro Roa (VEN), Consuelo Fuentes (PER)
5 July 2022; 13:00	(17–25, 25–20, 19–25, 25–21, 15–12); Report			Coliseo Cubierto Julio Monsalvo Castilla; Referees: Pedro Roa (VEN), Consuelo Fuentes (PER)
