= Luis Arias (volleyball) =

Venezuelan volleyball player (born 1989)

Personal information
- Full name: Luis Antonio Arias Guzmán
- Nationality: Venezuela
- Born: 17 January 1989 (age 36); Puerto la Cruz, Venezuela
- Height: 1.96 m (6 ft 5 in)

Sport
- Sport: Volleyball

Luis Antonio Arias Guzmán (born 17 January 1989) is a Venezuelan volleyball player. He competed in the 2020 Summer Olympics.
