= Colombia men's national volleyball team =

National volleyball team

Colombia
- Association: Federación Colombiana de Voleibol (FCV)
- Confederation: CSV
- Head coach: Paolo Montagnani
- FIVB ranking: 51 (3 August 2026)

Uniforms
Home	Away

World Championship
- Appearances: 1 (First in 2025)
- Best result: 26th (2025)

South American Championship
- Appearances: 18 (First in 1961)
- Best result: (2013, 2015, 2023)
- www.fedevolei.com.co
Honours
Event	1st	2nd	3rd
Pan American Games	0	0	1
CAC Games	1	1	0
South American Games	0	1	1
South American Championship	0	0	3
Copa Sudamericana	0	0	1
Bolivarian Games	3	3	2
Total	4	5	8
Pan American Games
Bronze medal – third place	2023 Santiago	Team
Central American and Caribbean Games
Gold medal – first place	2026 Santo Domingo	Team
Silver medal – second place	2018 Barranquilla	Team
South American Games
Silver medal – second place	2022 Asunción	Team
Bronze medal – third place	2010 Medellín	Team
South American Championship
Bronze medal – third place	2013 Cabo Frio	Team
Bronze medal – third place	2015 Maceió	Team
Bronze medal – third place	2023 Recife	Team
Copa Sudamericana
Bronze medal – third place	2026 Cochabamba	Team
Bolivarian Games
Gold medal – first place	1985 Cuenca	Team
Gold medal – first place	2022 Valledupar	Team
Gold medal – first place	2025 Lima-Ayacucho	Team
Silver medal – second place	1973 Panama City	Team
Silver medal – second place	2001 Ambato	Team
Silver medal – second place	2005 Armenia-Pereira	Team
Bronze medal – third place	2013 Trujillo	Team
Bronze medal – third place	2017 Santa Marta	Team

The Colombia men's national volleyball team represents Colombia in international volleyball competitions and friendly matches.

== Competition record ==
=== World Championship ===
- (Philippines) 2025 – 26th place

=== South American Championship ===
- (Colombia) 2009 – 4th place
- (Brazil) 2011 – 4th place
- (Brazil) 2013 – (bronze) 3rd place
- (Brazil) 2015 – (bronze) 3rd place
- (Chile) 2017 – 5th place
- (Chile) 2019 – 6th place
- (Brazil) 2021 – 4th place
- (Brazil) 2023 – (bronze) 3rd place

=== Copa Sudamericana ===
Champions Runners up Third place

Copa Sudamericana record
Year	Round	Position	GP	MW	ML	SW	SL	Squad
(Brazil) 2025	Did not participate							
(Bolivia) 2026	Semifinals	3rd	5	3	2	11	7	Squad
Total	0 Title	1/2	5	3	2	11	7	—

=== Bolivarian Games ===
- 2005 — 2nd place
- 2005 — 3rd place

== Team ==
=== Current squad ===
The following is Colombian roster for the 2025 World Championship.

Head coach: (Italy) Paolo Montagnani

No.	Name	Date of birth	Pos.	Height	Weight	Spike	Block	2025–26 club
1	Ronald Jiménez	January 9, 1990 (age 36)	OP	2.01 m (6 ft 7 in)	90 kg (200 lb)	375 cm (148 in)	350 cm (140 in)	(Argentina) UPCN Vóley Club
2	Marlon Mendoza	October 21, 2000 (age 25)	OH	1.92 m (6 ft 4 in)	71 kg (157 lb)	352 cm (139 in)	338 cm (133 in)	(Brazil) Praia Clube
5	Roosvuelt Ramos	October 21, 2000 (age 25)	L	1.80 m (5 ft 11 in)	70 kg (150 lb)	322 cm (127 in)	308 cm (121 in)	(Colombia) Zion Volley Club
6	Santiago Ruiz	March 27, 2002 (age 24)	OH	1.89 m (6 ft 2 in)	92 kg (203 lb)	350 cm (140 in)	315 cm (124 in)	(Kosovo) KV Ferizaj
7	Andrés Piza	August 3, 1991 (age 35)	OH	2.02 m (6 ft 8 in)	92 kg (203 lb)	350 cm (140 in)	315 cm (124 in)	(Turkey) Cizre Belediyespor
8	Leandro Mejía	November 8, 1996 (age 29)	MB	2.02 m (6 ft 8 in)	95 kg (209 lb)	0 cm (0 in)	0 cm (0 in)	(Chile) Deportes Linares
9	Jharold Caicedo	September 3, 2001 (age 24)	L	1.94 m (6 ft 4 in)	85 kg (187 lb)	360 cm (140 in)	325 cm (128 in)	Free agent
10	Gustavo Larrahondo	March 13, 1998 (age 28)	OP	1.97 m (6 ft 6 in)	100 kg (220 lb)	367 cm (144 in)	352 cm (139 in)	(Argentina) Ciudad Voley
11	Samuel Jaramillo	December 27, 2002 (age 23)	S	1.90 m (6 ft 3 in)	89 kg (196 lb)	340 cm (130 in)	320 cm (130 in)	(Finland) Raision Loimu
12	Cristian Palacios	March 21, 1993 (age 33)	MB	2.02 m (6 ft 8 in)	0 kg (0 lb)	351 cm (138 in)	348 cm (137 in)	(Spain) Grupo Egido Pinto
13	Juan Ambuila	March 27, 1993 (age 33)	S	1.98 m (6 ft 6 in)	88 kg (194 lb)	0 cm (0 in)	0 cm (0 in)	(Brazil) Montes Claros Vôlei
17	Miguel Ángel Martínez	October 23, 2003 (age 22)	OP	2.02 m (6 ft 8 in)	89 kg (196 lb)	355 cm (140 in)	338 cm (133 in)	(Spain) CV Playas de Benidorm
20	Juan Felipe Castañeda	March 3, 2003 (age 23)	OH	2.00 m (6 ft 7 in)	82 kg (181 lb)	355 cm (140 in)	345 cm (136 in)	(Puerto Rico) Cafeteros de Yauco
23	Daniel Aponza	August 27, 2001 (age 24)	MB	2.00 m (6 ft 7 in)	85 kg (187 lb)	365 cm (144 in)	348 cm (137 in)	(France) Saint-Nazaire Volley-Ball Atlantique
