= Ecuador men's national volleyball team =

National volleyball team

Ecuador
- Association: Federación Ecuatoriana de Voleibol
- Confederation: CSV
- Head coach: Johnny Molina

Uniforms
Home	Away

Summer Olympics
- Appearances: 0
- www.voleibolecuador.org

The Ecuador men's national volleyball team represents Ecuador in international volleyball competitions and friendly matches.

== Squads ==
Squad at the 2009 Bolivarian Games.

- Head Coach:

#	Name	Date of Birth	Weight	Height	Spike	Block
2	Stefano Berti	05.02.1993	75	175
3	Mario Yáñez	06.06.1982	82	191
4	Roberto Vilela	21.02.1985	68	182
5	Luis Sánchez	21.04.1985	82	175
6	Israel Vera	16.06.1979	80	185
7	Juan Carlos Pinzón	04.03.1981	78	183
8	Víctor Weir (c)	19.02.1975	87	186
9	Manuel Macías	09.10.1985	75	174
10	Miguel Valencia	23.10.1985	76	184
11	Richard Santos	21.02.1986	67	196
12	Daniel Maldonado	10.07.1987	78	183
