= Chile men's national volleyball team =

National sports team

Chile
- Nickname(s): Guerreros Rojos (Red Warriors)
- Association: Federación de Vóleibol de Chile (Fevochi)
- Confederation: CSV
- Head coach: Daniel Nejamkin
- FIVB ranking: 28 ▲4 (1 October 2026)

Uniforms
Home	Away

World Championship
- Appearances: 2 (First in 1982)
- Best result: 23rd (1982)

World Cup
- Appearances: 1 (First in 1991)
- Best result: 12th (1991)

South American Championship
- Appearances: 31 (First in 1956)
- Best result: (1961)
- www.fevochi.cl
Honours
South American Championship
Silver medal – second place	1961 Lima	Team
Bronze medal – third place	1967 Santos	Team
Bronze medal – third place	1981 Santiago	Team
Bronze medal – third place	1983 São Paulo	Team
Bronze medal – third place	1993 Córdoba	Team
Bronze medal – third place	2019 Santiago	Team
Bronze medal – third place	2021 Brasília	Team
Pan-American Cup
Bronze medal – third place	2023 Guadalajara	Team

The Chile men's national volleyball team represents Chile in international volleyball competitions and friendly matches.

== History ==
The Chile men's national volleyball team has a long history of participation in international competitions. They first competed in the Men's South American Volleyball Championship in 1956, and in 1961, they won a silver medal, which remains their best performance in this event. They have also participated in two FIVB Volleyball Men's World Cup, debuting in 1982 and achieving their best finish at 23rd place. Chile made its sole World Cup appearance in 1991, finishing 12th. The team has had several notable results in regional tournaments, including multiple bronze medals at the South American Championship, with recent success in 2019 and 2021.

=== South American Championship ===
Chile has competed in the South American Volleyball Championship since 1956. The team won the silver medal in 1961, its best result in the competition at that time, and later recorded third-place finishes in 1967, 1981, 1983, 1993, 2019, and 2021.

The team has shown resilience at the Pan American Games, achieving fourth place in both 1963 and 2019. They have consistently participated in the Pan American Games, with their most recent appearance in 2023, continuing their tradition of competitive play in the Americas.

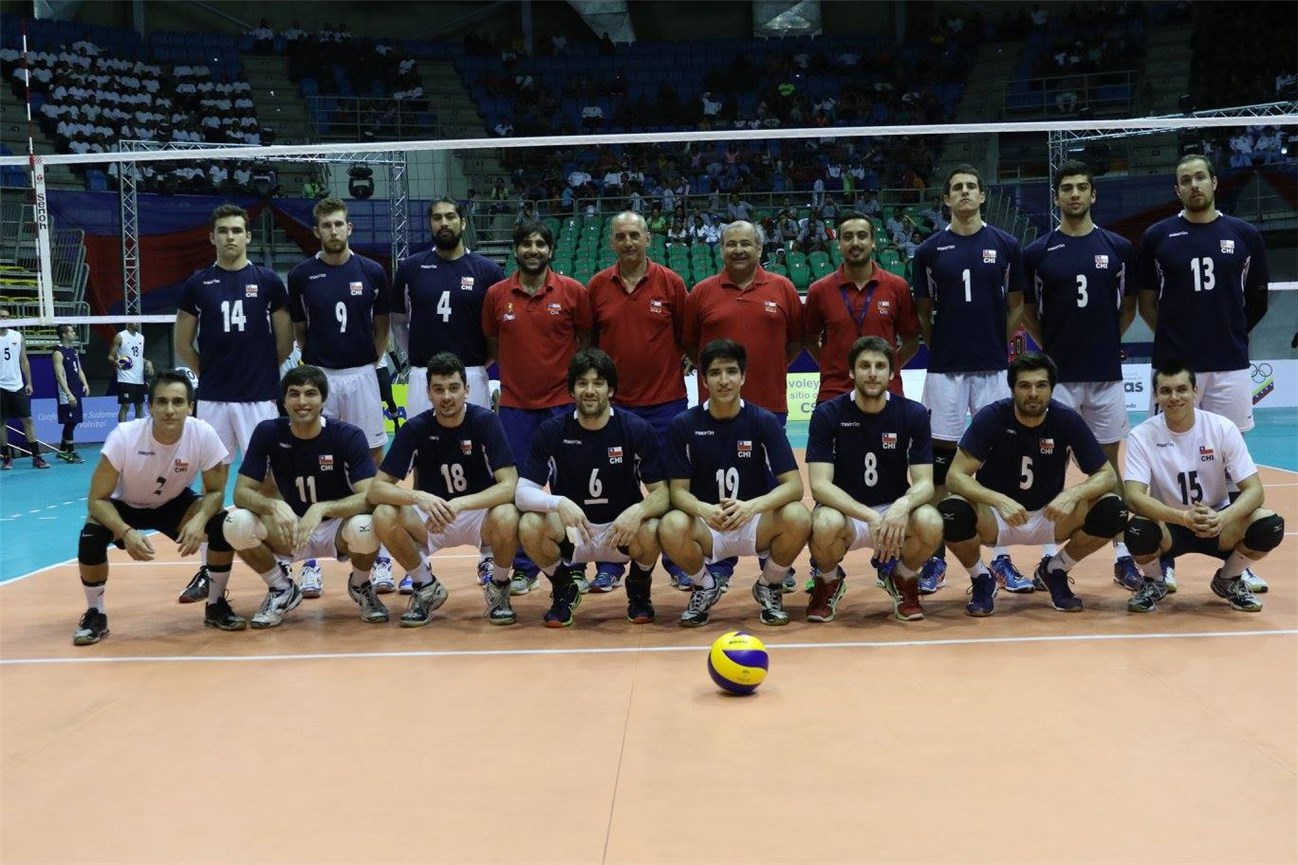
Chilean national team who played at the 2015 Olympic Qualifying Championship in Caracas.

The Chilean team has also been successful in the Bolivarian Games, where they won the gold medal in 2013 and silver medals in 2017 and 2022. These accomplishments underscore their strength in regional competitions.

Led by head coach Daniel Nejamkin, the team is currently ranked 29th in the world as of July 2024, reflecting their steady progress on the global stage. Chile also had a notable appearance in the Challenger Cup, participating five times between 2018 and 2024, with their best result coming in 2023 when they finished fourth. This competition has provided Chile with more opportunities to face high-level international teams and improve their skills.

At the Pan American Cup, Chile's best finish came in 2023, where they secured the bronze medal. This result marked an important achievement for the team on the international stage and highlighted their development in recent years.

== Competition record ==
=== World Championship ===
- (Argentina) 1982 – 23rd place
- (Philippines) 2025 – 31st place

=== World Cup ===
- (Japan) 1991 – 12th place

=== Challenger Cup ===
- (Portugal) 2018 – 5th place
- (Slovenia) 2019 – 6th place
- (South Korea) 2022 – 8th place
- (Qatar) 2023 – 4th place
- (China) 2024 – 7th place

=== South American Championship ===
- (Uruguay) 1956 – 5th place
- (Brazil) 1958 – 5th place
- (Peru) 1961 – Runners-up
- (Brazil) 1967 – 3rd place
- (Chile) 1981 – 3rd place
- (Brazil) 1983 – 3rd place
- (Argentina) 1993 – 3rd place
- (Brazil) 1995 – 4th place
- (Venezuela) 1997 – 6th place
- (Brazil) 2003 – 4th place
- (Brazil) 2005 – 5th place
- (Chile) 2007 – 4th place
- (Colombia) 2009 – 5th place
- (Brazil) 2011 – 5th place
- (Brazil) 2013 – 4th place
- (Brazil) 2015 – 5th place
- (Chile) 2017 – 4th place
- (Chile) 2019 – 3rd place
- (Brazil) 2021 – 3rd place
- (Brazil) 2023 – 4th place
- (Brazil) 2026 – 3rd place

=== Copa Sudamericana ===
Champions Runners up Third place Fourth place

Copa Sudamericana record
Year	Round	Position	GP	MW	ML	SW	SL	Squad
(Brazil) 2025	Round robin	4th	4	1	3	5	9	Squad
(Bolivia) 2026	Qualified							
Total	0 Title	2/2	4	1	3	5	9	—

=== Pan-American Cup ===
- (Mexico) 2016 – 7th place
- (Mexico) 2018 – 8th place
- (Mexico) 2019 – 4th place
- (Canada) 2022 – 4th place
- (Mexico) 2023 – (bronze) 3rd place

=== Pan-American Games ===
- (Brazil) 1963 – 4th place
- (Colombia) 1971 – 7th place
- (Peru) 2019 – 4th place
- (Chile) 2023 – 7th place

=== Bolivarian Games ===
- (Peru) 2013 – (gold) Gold medal
- (Colombia) 2017 – (silver) Silver medal
- (Colombia) 2022 – (silver) Silver medal

== Players ==
=== Current squad ===
Head coach: (Argentina) Daniel Nejamkin

#	Name	Age	Height	Weight	Attack	Block	Position	Club
1	Simón Guerra	30 years old	201 cm	87 kg	350 cm	330 cm	MB	(England) Polonia London
2	Vicente Ibarra	25 years old	203 cm	90 kg	335 cm	320 cm	OH	(Argentina) Ciudad de Buenos Aires
3	Gabriel Araya	31 years old	201 cm	92 kg	345 cm	330 cm	MB	(Greece) AS Kerkis
4	Tomás Parraguirre	35 years old	198 cm	113 kg	335 cm	315 cm	OP	(Spain) Arona Tenerife Sur
7	Rafael Albornoz	29 years old	193 cm	85 kg	347 cm	327 cm	OH	(Spain) Arona Tenerife Sur
9	Dusan Bonacić (captain)	31 years old	198 cm	93 kg	351 cm	326 cm	OH	(Qatar) Al Rayyan
10	Vicente Mardones	26 years old	208 cm	90 kg	350 cm	320 cm	OP	(United States) Limestone University
11	Vicente Parraguirre	31 years old	196 cm	91 kg	341 cm	315 cm	OH	(Argentina) Ciudad de Buenos Aires
13	Lucas Lavín	26 years old	188 cm	74 kg	310 cm	290 cm	L	(Chile) Stadio Italiano
14	Esteban Villarreal	29 years old	193 cm	83 kg	325 cm	305 cm	S	(Spain) Unicaja Costa
15	Sebastián Castillo	31 years old	180 cm	75 kg	318 cm	305 cm	L	(Chile) Deportes Usach
16	Tomás Gago	29 years old	198 cm	85 kg	350 cm	335 cm	MB	(United States) Purdue University Fort Wayne
17	Jaime Bravo	24 years old	181 cm	70 kg	300 cm	290 cm	L	(Chile) FullVolley
18	Kaj Bonacić	21 years old	190 cm	85 kg	340 cm	322 cm	OH	(Chile) Murano
19	Matías Banda	31 years old	191 cm	83 kg	325 cm	310 cm	S	(England) Polonia London

=== Past squads ===
Chile
- (Chile) 1982 FIVB Volleyball Men's World Championship — 1st round
  Jorge Hevia (captain), Erwin Gevert, Ricardo Vorphal, Arie Husid, Santiago Guerra, Roberto Bozzo, Gonzalo Landaeta, José Luis Alvarez, Víctor Oliveros, Alex Gevert, James Lamig y Andrés Acuña.
- Head coach: Miguel Holz

== See also ==
- Chile women's national volleyball team
