= Bolivia men's national volleyball team =

National volleyball team

Bolivia
- Association: Federación Boliviana de Voleibol
- Confederation: CSV
- Head coach: Fernando Quiroga

Uniforms
Home	Away

Summer Olympics
- Appearances: 0

Bolivia men's national volleyball team
Medal record

The Bolivia men's national volleyball team represents Bolivia in international volleyball competitions and friendly matches.

== Results ==
=== Bolivarian Games ===
- 2005 — 3rd place

== Squads ==
Squad at the 2005 Bolivarian Games.

- Head Coach: Raúl David García

#	Name	Date of Birth	Weight	Height	Spike	Block
2	Rodrigo Zelada	02.01.1988	68	185
3	Carlos Julio Languidey	20.09.1986	90	189
5	Rolando Ismael	30.10.1986	82	193
6	René Fernando Barrientos	30.12.1973	75	171
7	Cristian Rodolfo Lazarte	03.06.1984	73	182
8	Dorian Ovidio Guachalla (c)	20.07.1977	81	186
9	Armin Zubieta	05.07.1985	73	182
10	Iván Franco Meruvia	25.12.1985	75	191
11	Edson Pérez	01.08.1980	69	180
12	Daniel Calvo	17.07.1980	83	185
