= 2010 FIVB Women's Volleyball World Championship squads =

Below are listed all participating squads of the 2010 FIVB Women's Volleyball World Championship, held in several cities in Japan from 29 October to 14 November 2010.

== Squads ==
- This player is in main roster

=== Pool A ===
==== Algeria ====
No	Player	Height	Weight	Club	Position
1	Fatma Zohra Cherif	178 cm (5 ft 10 in)	68 kg (150 lb; 10.7 st)	(Algeria) WA Tlemcen	
2	Manel Yaakoubi	178 cm (5 ft 10 in)	70 kg (150 lb; 11 st)	(Algeria) Nejmet Chlef	
3	Salima Hammouche	158 cm (5 ft 2 in)	54 kg (119 lb; 8.5 st)	(Algeria) Groupement Sportif des Pétroliers	L
4	Fatma Zahra Djouad	180 cm (5 ft 11 in)	62 kg (137 lb; 9.8 st)	(Algeria) Naceria Club Bejaïa	OH
5	Celia Bourihane	177 cm (5 ft 9 1/2 in)	60 kg (130 lb; 9.4 st)	(Algeria) Naceria Club Bejaïa	
6	Silya Magnana	180 cm (5 ft 11 in)	71 kg (157 lb; 11.2 st)	(Algeria) ASW Bejaïa	MB
7	Chanez Ayadi	172 cm (5 ft 7 1/2 in)	59 kg (130 lb; 9.3 st)	(Algeria) Naceria Club Bejaïa	
8	Zohra Bensalem	178 cm (5 ft 10 in)	68 kg (150 lb; 10.7 st)	(Algeria) Groupement Sportif des Pétroliers	OH/OP
9	Narimène Madani	180 cm (5 ft 11 in)	77 kg (170 lb; 12.1 st)	(Algeria) MB Bejaïa	MB
10	Fatma-Zohra Oukazi	175 cm (5 ft 9 in)	67 kg (148 lb; 10.6 st)	(Algeria) Groupement Sportif des Pétroliers	S
11	Mouni Abderrahim	171 cm (5 ft 7 1/2 in)	60 kg (130 lb; 9.4 st)	(Algeria) ASW Bejaïa	OH
12	Safia Boukhima	176 cm (5 ft 9 1/2 in)	64 kg (141 lb; 10.1 st)	(Algeria) ASW Bejaïa	OH
13	Nawal Mansouri	174 cm (5 ft 8 1/2 in)	64 kg (141 lb; 10.1 st)	(Algeria) Naceria Club Bejaïa	L
14	Faïza Tsabet	181 cm (5 ft 11 1/2 in)	77 kg (170 lb; 12.1 st)	(Spain) CV Tenerife	OP/OH
15	Aicha Mezemate	187 cm (6 ft 1 1/2 in)	84 kg (185 lb; 13.2 st)	(Algeria) Naceria Club Bejaïa	
16	Kahina Messaoudene	183 cm (6 ft 0 in)	56 kg (123 lb; 8.8 st)	(Algeria) ASW Bejaïa	
17	Lydia Oulmou	186 cm (6 ft 1 in)	74 kg (163 lb; 11.7 st)	(France) Istres Volleyball	MB
18	Tassadit Aïssou	184 cm (6 ft 1/2 in)	80 kg (180 lb; 13 st)	(Algeria) ASW Bejaïa	MB
18	Sarah Akroun	175 cm (5 ft 9 in)	60 kg (130 lb; 9.4 st)	(Algeria) ASW Bejaïa	

Coach: Mouloud Ikhedji

==== Costa Rica ====
No	Player	Height	Weight	Club	Position
1	Dionisia Thompson	169 cm (5 ft 6 1/2 in)	78 kg (172 lb; 12.3 st)	(Costa Rica) Goicoechea	S
2	Catalina Fernández	182 cm (5 ft 11 1/2 in)	70 kg (150 lb; 11 st)	University of Costa Rica	MB
3	Viviana Murillo Chávez	163 cm (5 ft 4 in)	63 kg (139 lb; 9.9 st)	(Costa Rica) Santa Bárbara	
4	Adriana Chinchilla Monge	170 cm (5 ft 7 in)	65 kg (143 lb; 10.2 st)	(Costa Rica) Goicoechea	OH
5	Karen Cope	170 cm (5 ft 7 in)	50 kg (110 lb; 7.9 st)	University of Costa Rica	OP
6	Angela Willis	188 cm (6 ft 2 in)	67 kg (148 lb; 10.6 st)	USA	MB
7	Mariela Quesada Sequeira	177 cm (5 ft 9 1/2 in)	70 kg (150 lb; 11 st)	(United States) Palm Beach Atlantic University	OH
8	Susana Chávez González	160 cm (5 ft 3 in)	55 kg (121 lb; 8.7 st)	University of Costa Rica	
9	Verania Willis	182 cm (5 ft 11 1/2 in)	73 kg (161 lb; 11.5 st)	USA	OH
10	Paola Ramírez Vargas	186 cm (6 ft 1 in)	85 kg (187 lb; 13.4 st)	University of Costa Rica	MB
11	Onicka Pinnock Gibbons	170 cm (5 ft 7 in)	58 kg (128 lb; 9.1 st)	(Costa Rica) Santa Bárbara	
12	Marie Hadar Smith	185 cm (6 ft 1 in)	80 kg (180 lb; 13 st)	(United States) Humboldt High School	OP
13	Tamara Piva	175 cm (5 ft 9 in)	75 kg (165 lb; 11.8 st)	(Costa Rica) Goicoechea	
14	Irene Fonseca Ávila	182 cm (5 ft 11 1/2 in)	70 kg (150 lb; 11 st)	(Costa Rica) Santa Bárbara	S
15	Marcela Araya	167 cm (5 ft 5 1/2 in)	52 kg (115 lb; 8.2 st)	University of Costa Rica	
16	Mijal Hines Cuza	186 cm (6 ft 1 in)	84 kg (185 lb; 13.2 st)	(Costa Rica) Goicoechea	MB
17	Marianela Alfaro	166 cm (5 ft 5 1/2 in)	59 kg (130 lb; 9.3 st)	(Costa Rica) Santa Bárbara	L
18	María Fernanda Conejo	182 cm (5 ft 11 1/2 in)	75 kg (165 lb; 11.8 st)	University of Costa Rica	
19	Angélica Jiménez	185 cm (6 ft 1 in)	85 kg (187 lb; 13.4 st)	(Costa Rica) Goicoechea	

Coach: Braulio Godínez

==== Japan ====
No	Player	Height	Weight	Club	Position
1	Megumi Kurihara	187 cm (6 ft 1 1/2 in)	68 kg (150 lb; 10.7 st)	(Japan) Pioneer Red Wings	OP/OH
2	Hitomi Nakamichi	159 cm (5 ft 2 1/2 in)	54 kg (119 lb; 8.5 st)	(Japan) Toray Arrows	S
3	Yoshie Takeshita	159 cm (5 ft 2 1/2 in)	52 kg (115 lb; 8.2 st)	(Japan) JT Marvelous	S
4	Kaori Inoue	182 cm (5 ft 11 1/2 in)	59 kg (130 lb; 9.3 st)	(Japan) Denso Airybees	MB
5	Ai Yamamoto	184 cm (6 ft 1/2 in)	69 kg (152 lb; 10.9 st)	(Japan) JT Marvelous	MB
6	Yuko Sano	160 cm (5 ft 3 in)	54 kg (119 lb; 8.5 st)	(Azerbaijan) Igtisadchi Baku	L
7	Mai Yamaguchi	178 cm (5 ft 10 in)	62 kg (137 lb; 9.8 st)	(Japan) Okayama Seagulls	OP/OH
8	Chie Yoshizawa	172 cm (5 ft 7 1/2 in)	66 kg (146 lb; 10.4 st)	(Japan) JT Marvelous	OH/OP
9	Mizuho Ishida	174 cm (5 ft 8 1/2 in)	67 kg (148 lb; 10.6 st)	(Japan) Hisamitsu Springs	OH
10	Yuki Shoji	182 cm (5 ft 11 1/2 in)	67 kg (148 lb; 10.6 st)	(Japan) Ageo Medics	MB
11	Erika Araki	186 cm (6 ft 1 in)	80 kg (180 lb; 13 st)	(Japan) Toray Arrows	MB
12	Saori Kimura	187 cm (6 ft 1 1/2 in)	66 kg (146 lb; 10.4 st)	(Japan) Toray Arrows	OH
13	Hiroko Matsuura	180 cm (5 ft 11 in)	76 kg (168 lb; 12.0 st)	(Japan) NEC Red Rockets	S/OH
14	Yukiko Ebata	178 cm (5 ft 10 in)	70 kg (150 lb; 11 st)	(Japan) Hitachi Rivale	OH
15	Maiko Kano	184 cm (6 ft 1/2 in)	68 kg (150 lb; 10.7 st)		OP/OH
16	Saori Sakoda	178 cm (5 ft 10 in)	64 kg (141 lb; 10.1 st)	(Japan) Toray Arrows	OH
17	Akiko Ino	168 cm (5 ft 6 in)	59 kg (130 lb; 9.3 st)	(Japan) NEC Red Rockets	L/R
18	Maiko Sakashita	180 cm (5 ft 11 in)	74 kg (163 lb; 11.7 st)	(Japan) JT Marvelous	OP
19	Kanari Hamaguchi	167 cm (5 ft 5 1/2 in)	60 kg (130 lb; 9.4 st)	(Japan) Toray Arrows	L
20	Kotoe Inoue	161 cm (5 ft 3 1/2 in)	55 kg (121 lb; 8.7 st)	(Japan) JT Marvelous	L

Coach: Masayoshi Manabe

==== Peru ====
No	Player	Height	Weight	Club	Position
1	Angélica Aquino	170 cm (5 ft 7 in)	65 kg (143 lb; 10.2 st)	(Peru) Divino Maestro	OH
2	Mirtha Uribe	182 cm (5 ft 11 1/2 in)	67 kg (148 lb; 10.6 st)	(Peru) Deportivo Alianza	MB
3	Paola García	182 cm (5 ft 11 1/2 in)	68 kg (150 lb; 10.7 st)	(Peru) Divino Maestro	MB
4	Patricia Soto	179 cm (5 ft 10 1/2 in)	67 kg (148 lb; 10.6 st)	(Peru) Club de Regatas Lima	OP/OH
5	Vanessa Palacios	167 cm (5 ft 5 1/2 in)	66 kg (146 lb; 10.4 st)	(Peru) Divino Maestro	L
6	Jessenia Uceda	178 cm (5 ft 10 in)	69 kg (152 lb; 10.9 st)	(Peru) Deportivo Géminis	OH
7	Yulissa Zamudio Ore	184 cm (6 ft 1/2 in)	61 kg (134 lb; 9.6 st)	(Peru) Alianza Lima	MB
8	Daniela Uribe	180 cm (5 ft 11 in)	63 kg (139 lb; 9.9 st)	(Peru) Deportivo Alianza	OP
9	Raffaella Camet	177 cm (5 ft 9 1/2 in)	67 kg (148 lb; 10.6 st)	(Peru) Sporting Cristal	OP
10	Leyla Chihuán	180 cm (5 ft 11 in)	67 kg (148 lb; 10.6 st)	(Peru) Regatas Lima	MB
11	Clarivett Yliescas	179 cm (5 ft 10 1/2 in)	63 kg (139 lb; 9.9 st)	(Peru) Divino Maestro	MB
12	Carla Rueda	180 cm (5 ft 11 in)	65 kg (143 lb; 10.2 st)	(Peru) Deportivo Géminis	OP/OH
13	Zoila La Rosa	171 cm (5 ft 7 1/2 in)	57 kg (126 lb; 9.0 st)	(Peru) Divino Maestro	S
14	Elena Keldibekova	177 cm (5 ft 9 1/2 in)	72 kg (159 lb; 11.3 st)	(Peru) Regatas Lima	S
15	Karla Ortiz	178 cm (5 ft 10 in)	60 kg (130 lb; 9.4 st)	(Peru) Divino Maestro	OH/OP
16	Alexandra Muñoz	177 cm (5 ft 9 1/2 in)	63 kg (139 lb; 9.9 st)	(Peru) Divino Maestro	S
17	Vivian Baella	173 cm (5 ft 8 in)	63 kg (139 lb; 9.9 st)	(Peru) Regatas Lima	L/OH
18	Grecia Herrada	174 cm (5 ft 8 1/2 in)	65 kg (143 lb; 10.2 st)	(Peru) Deportivo Géminis	OH

Coach: (South Korea) Cheol Yong Kim

==== Poland ====
No	Player	Height	Weight	Club	Position
2	Mariola Zenik	174 cm (5 ft 8 1/2 in)	64 kg (141 lb; 10.1 st)	(Poland) Bank BPS Muszyna	L/R
3	Karolina Kosek	183 cm (6 ft 0 in)	68 kg (150 lb; 10.7 st)	(Poland) Organika Budowlani Łódź	OH
4	Izabela Bełcik	185 cm (6 ft 1 in)	65 kg (143 lb; 10.2 st)	(Poland) Atom Trefl Sopot	S
5	Berenika Okuniewska	188 cm (6 ft 2 in)	72 kg (159 lb; 11.3 st)	(Poland) BKS Aluprof Bielsko-Biała	MB
6	Agnieszka Bednarek-Kasza	185 cm (6 ft 1 in)	70 kg (150 lb; 11 st)	(Poland) Bank BPS Muszyna	MB
7	Małgorzata Glinka-Mogentale	191 cm (6 ft 3 in)	84 kg (185 lb; 13.2 st)	(Turkey) VB Güneş Sigorta Türk Telekom	OP/OH
8	Katarzyna Zaroślińska	187 cm (6 ft 1 1/2 in)	72 kg (159 lb; 11.3 st)	(Poland) Organika Budowlani Łódź	OP
9	Joanna Staniucha-Szczurek	184 cm (6 ft 1/2 in)	76 kg (168 lb; 12.0 st)	(Poland) Tauron MKS Dąbrowa Górnicza	OH
10	Klaudia Kaczorowska	184 cm (6 ft 1/2 in)	68 kg (150 lb; 10.7 st)	(Poland) Bank BPS Muszyna	OH
11	Anna Werblińska	178 cm (5 ft 10 in)	66 kg (146 lb; 10.4 st)	(Poland) BKS Aluprof Bielsko-Biała	OH
12	Milena Sadurek	177 cm (5 ft 9 1/2 in)	65 kg (143 lb; 10.2 st)	(Poland) Bank BPS Muszyna	S
13	Paulina Maj	166 cm (5 ft 5 1/2 in)	58 kg (128 lb; 9.1 st)	(Poland) Atom Trefl Sopot	L/R
14	Joanna Wołosz	181 cm (5 ft 11 1/2 in)	65 kg (143 lb; 10.2 st)	(Poland) Impel Gwardia Wrocław	S
15	Katarzyna Gajgał	190 cm (6 ft 3 in)	85 kg (187 lb; 13.4 st)	(Poland) Bank BPS Muszyna	MB
16	Aleksandra Jagieło	180 cm (5 ft 11 in)	70 kg (150 lb; 11 st)	(Poland) Bank BPS Muszyna	OH
17	Joanna Kaczor	193 cm (6 ft 4 in)	64 kg (141 lb; 10.1 st)	(Poland) Bank BPS Muszyna	OP/OH
18	Krystyna Strasz	165 cm (5 ft 5 in)	55 kg (121 lb; 8.7 st)	(Poland) Tauron MKS Dąbrowa Górnicza	L/R
19	Maja Tokarska	194 cm (6 ft 4 1/2 in)	72 kg (159 lb; 11.3 st)	(Poland) Impel Gwardia Wrocław	MB
20	Zuzanna Efimienko	198 cm (6 ft 6 in)	72 kg (159 lb; 11.3 st)	(Poland) Impel Gwardia Wrocław	MB

Coach: Jerzy Matlak

==== Serbia ====
No	Player	Height	Weight	Club	Position
1	Jelena Nikolić	194 cm (6 ft 4 1/2 in)	75 kg (165 lb; 11.8 st)	(Turkey) VakıfBank İstanbul	OH
2	Jovana Brakočević	196 cm (6 ft 5 in)	77 kg (170 lb; 12.1 st)	(China) Evergrande	OP
3	Sanja Malagurski	191 cm (6 ft 3 in)	77 kg (170 lb; 12.1 st)	(Serbia) Crvena Zvezda Beograd	OP/OH
4	Bojana Živković	186 cm (6 ft 1 in)	69 kg (152 lb; 10.9 st)	(Serbia) Crvena Zvezda Beograd	S
5	Nataša Krsmanović	186 cm (6 ft 1 in)	70 kg (150 lb; 11 st)	(Azerbaijan) Rabita Baku	MB
6	Jasna Majstorović	180 cm (5 ft 11 in)	62 kg (137 lb; 9.8 st)	(Romania) CS Constanta	OH
7	Brižitka Molnar	182 cm (5 ft 11 1/2 in)	66 kg (146 lb; 10.4 st)	(Greece) Panathinaikos Athens	OH/OP
8	Ana Antonijević	185 cm (6 ft 1 in)	71 kg (157 lb; 11.2 st)	(France) RC Cannes	S
9	Jovana Vesović	182 cm (5 ft 11 1/2 in)	68 kg (150 lb; 10.7 st)	(Romania) CS Dinamo București	OH
10	Maja Ognjenović	184 cm (6 ft 1/2 in)	68 kg (150 lb; 10.7 st)	(Greece) Olympiacos S.C.	S
11	Stefana Veljković	183 cm (6 ft 0 in)	68 kg (150 lb; 10.7 st)	(Serbia) Poštar 064 Beograd	MB
12	Amadea Duraković	188 cm (6 ft 2 in)	68 kg (150 lb; 10.7 st)	(France) RC Cannes	OH/OP
13	Ana Bjelica	190 cm (6 ft 3 in)	70 kg (150 lb; 11 st)	(Serbia) Crvena Zvezda Beograd	OP/OH
14	Nađa Ninković	189 cm (6 ft 2 1/2 in)	67 kg (148 lb; 10.6 st)	(Serbia) Crvena Zvezda Beograd	MB
15	Sara Klisura	185 cm (6 ft 1 in)	69 kg (152 lb; 10.9 st)	(Serbia) Spartak Subotica	OH
16	Milena Rašić	193 cm (6 ft 4 in)	58 kg (128 lb; 9.1 st)	(France) RC Cannes	MB
17	Silvija Popović	178 cm (5 ft 10 in)	60 kg (130 lb; 9.4 st)	(Azerbaijan) Rabita Baku	L
18	Suzana Ćebić	167 cm (5 ft 5 1/2 in)	60 kg (130 lb; 9.4 st)	(Germany) Vfb 91 Suhl	L
19	Dragana Marinković	197 cm (6 ft 5 1/2 in)	75 kg (165 lb; 11.8 st)	(Italy) Zoppas Cornegliano	MB
20	Danica Radenković	184 cm (6 ft 1/2 in)	65 kg (143 lb; 10.2 st)	(Serbia) Spartak Subotica	S

Coach: Zoran Terzić

=== Pool B ===
==== Brazil ====
No	Player	Height	Weight	Club	Position
1	Fabiana Claudino	194 cm (6 ft 4 1/2 in)	76 kg (168 lb; 12.0 st)	(Brazil) Unilever Vôlei	MB
2	Caroline Gattaz	191 cm (6 ft 3 in)	87 kg (192 lb; 13.7 st)	(Brazil) Unilever Vôlei	MB
3	Danielle Lins	184 cm (6 ft 1/2 in)	68 kg (150 lb; 10.7 st)	(Brazil) Unilever Vôlei	S
4	Paula Pequeno	187 cm (6 ft 1 1/2 in)	74 kg (163 lb; 11.7 st)	(Brazil) Vôlei Futuro	OH
5	Adenízia Silva	186 cm (6 ft 1 in)	63 kg (139 lb; 9.9 st)	(Brazil) Sollys/Osasco	MB
6	Thaísa Menezes	196 cm (6 ft 5 in)	79 kg (174 lb; 12.4 st)	(Brazil) Sollys/Osasco	MB
7	Hélia Souza	176 cm (5 ft 9 1/2 in)	65 kg (143 lb; 10.2 st)	(Turkey) Fenerbahçe Acıbadem	S
8	Jaqueline Carvalho	187 cm (6 ft 1 1/2 in)	70 kg (150 lb; 11 st)	(Brazil) Sollys/Osasco	OH
9	Natalia Martins	185 cm (6 ft 1 in)	69 kg (152 lb; 10.9 st)	(Brazil) São Caetano	MB
10	Wélissa Gonzaga	179 cm (5 ft 10 1/2 in)	76 kg (168 lb; 12.0 st)	(Brazil) Sollys/Osasco	OH
11	Joyce Silva	190 cm (6 ft 3 in)	67 kg (148 lb; 10.6 st)	(Brazil) Unilever Vôlei	OP/OH
12	Natália Pereira	186 cm (6 ft 1 in)	76 kg (168 lb; 12.0 st)	(Brazil) Sollys/Osasco	OH/OP
13	Sheilla Castro	186 cm (6 ft 1 in)	64 kg (141 lb; 10.1 st)	(Brazil) São Caetano	OP
14	Fabiana de Oliveira	185 cm (6 ft 1 in)	64 kg (141 lb; 10.1 st)	(Brazil) Unilever Vôlei	L
15	Ana Tiemi Takagui	187 cm (6 ft 1 1/2 in)	74 kg (163 lb; 11.7 st)	(Brazil) Sollys/Osasco	S
16	Fernanda Rodrigues	180 cm (5 ft 11 in)	74 kg (163 lb; 11.7 st)	(Brazil) Pinheiros	OH
17	Fabíola de Souza	184 cm (6 ft 1/2 in)	70 kg (150 lb; 11 st)	(Brazil) Pinheiros	S
18	Camila Brait	170 cm (5 ft 7 in)	58 kg (128 lb; 9.1 st)	(Brazil) Sollys/Osasco	L
19	Juciely Cristina Barreto	184 cm (6 ft 1/2 in)	71 kg (157 lb; 11.2 st)	(Brazil) São Caetano	MB
20	Regiane Bidias	190 cm (6 ft 3 in)	74 kg (163 lb; 11.7 st)	(Brazil) Unilever Vôlei	OH

Coach: José Roberto Guimarães

==== Czech Republic ====
No	Player	Height	Weight	Club	Position
1	Andrea Kossanyiova	185 cm (6 ft 1 in)	65 kg (143 lb; 10.2 st)	(Czech Republic) PVK Olymp Praha	OP
2	Šárka Barborková	192 cm (6 ft 3 1/2 in)	71 kg (157 lb; 11.2 st)	(Germany) Rote Raben Vilsbiburg	OH
3	Kristýna Pastulová	197 cm (6 ft 5 1/2 in)	80 kg (180 lb; 13 st)	(Czech Republic) PVK Přerov	MB
4	Aneta Havlíčková	190 cm (6 ft 3 in)	88 kg (194 lb; 13.9 st)	(Italy) Busto Arsizio	OP
5	Julie Jasova	179 cm (5 ft 10 1/2 in)	62 kg (137 lb; 9.8 st)	(Germany) VT Aurubis Hamburg	L
6	Kateřina Bucková	190 cm (6 ft 3 in)	71 kg (157 lb; 11.2 st)	(France) Rocheville Le Cannet	MB
7	Tereza Tobiasova	180 cm (5 ft 11 in)	65 kg (143 lb; 10.2 st)	(Czech Republic) VK Královo Pole Brno	OH
8	Sarka Melicharkova	183 cm (6 ft 0 in)	64 kg (141 lb; 10.1 st)	(Czech Republic) VK Královo Pole Brno	OH
9	Anna Kallistova	189 cm (6 ft 2 1/2 in)	71 kg (157 lb; 11.2 st)	(Czech Republic) PVK Olymp Praha	MB
10	Pavla Vincourová	180 cm (5 ft 11 in)	62 kg (137 lb; 9.8 st)	(Czech Republic) VK Královo Pole Brno	MB
11	Michaela Jelinkova	186 cm (6 ft 1 in)	80 kg (180 lb; 13 st)	(Germany) USC Münster	S
12	Martina Jakubšová	185 cm (6 ft 1 in)	80 kg (180 lb; 13 st)	(Czech Republic) PVK Olymp Praha	OH
13	Tereza Vanžurová	185 cm (6 ft 1 in)	80 kg (180 lb; 13 st)	(Czech Republic) PVK Olymp Praha	OH
14	Lucie Muhlsteinova	178 cm (5 ft 10 in)	70 kg (150 lb; 11 st)	(Poland) MKS Dąbrowa Górnicza	S
15	Helena Kojdová	185 cm (6 ft 1 in)	64 kg (141 lb; 10.1 st)	(Czech Republic) TJ Sokol Frydek-Mistek	OH/OP
16	Helena Havelková	187 cm (6 ft 1 1/2 in)	64 kg (141 lb; 10.1 st)	(Italy) Busto Arsizio	OH
17	Ivana Plchotova	192 cm (6 ft 3 1/2 in)	71 kg (157 lb; 11.2 st)	(Poland) MKS Dąbrowa Górnicza	MB
18	Martina Utla	185 cm (6 ft 1 in)	68 kg (150 lb; 10.7 st)	(Czech Republic) VK Královo Pole Brno	OP

Coach: Jirí Šiller

==== Italy ====
No	Player	Height	Weight	Club	Position
1	Annamaria Quaranta	184 cm (6 ft 1/2 in)	67 kg (148 lb; 10.6 st)	(Italy) Pallavolo Sirio Perugia	OH/OP
2	Cristina Barcellini	187 cm (6 ft 1 1/2 in)	78 kg (172 lb; 12.3 st)	(Italy) Asystel Novara	OH
3	Ilaria Garzaro	189 cm (6 ft 2 1/2 in)	70 kg (150 lb; 11 st)	(Italy) Chateau d'Ax Urbino Volley	MB
4	Lucia Crisanti	186 cm (6 ft 1 in)	70 kg (150 lb; 11 st)	(Italy) Busto Arsizio	MB
5	Giulia Rondon	189 cm (6 ft 2 1/2 in)	74 kg (163 lb; 11.7 st)	(Italy) Pallavolo Sirio Perugia	S
6	Chiara Arcangeli	167 cm (5 ft 5 1/2 in)	57 kg (126 lb; 9.0 st)	(Italy) Pallavolo Sirio Perugia	L
7	Noemi Signorile	182 cm (5 ft 11 1/2 in)	74 kg (163 lb; 11.7 st)	(Italy) Foppapedretti Bergamo	S
9	Chiara Di Iulio	184 cm (6 ft 1/2 in)	65 kg (143 lb; 10.2 st)	(Italy) Chateau d'Ax Urbino Volley	OH
10	Paola Cardullo	164 cm (5 ft 4 1/2 in)	56 kg (123 lb; 8.8 st)	(Italy) MC Carnaghi Villa Cortese	L
11	Serena Ortolani	187 cm (6 ft 1 1/2 in)	63 kg (139 lb; 9.9 st)	(Italy) Foppapedretti Bergamo	OP/OH
12	Francesca Piccinini	184 cm (6 ft 1/2 in)	71 kg (157 lb; 11.2 st)	(Italy) Foppapedretti Bergamo	OH
13	Valentina Arrighetti	185 cm (6 ft 1 in)	72 kg (159 lb; 11.3 st)	(Italy) Foppapedretti Bergamo	MB
14	Eleonora Lo Bianco	171 cm (5 ft 7 1/2 in)	67 kg (148 lb; 10.6 st)	(Italy) Foppapedretti Bergamo	S
15	Antonella Del Core	184 cm (6 ft 1/2 in)	70 kg (150 lb; 11 st)	(Turkey) Eczacıbaşı Zentiva	OH
16	Lucia Bosetti	180 cm (5 ft 11 in)	65 kg (143 lb; 10.2 st)	(Italy) Foppapedretti Bergamo	OH/OP
17	Simona Gioli	185 cm (6 ft 1 in)	70 kg (150 lb; 11 st)	(Russia) Dynamo Moscow	MB/OP
18	Marta Bechis	181 cm (5 ft 11 1/2 in)	59 kg (130 lb; 9.3 st)	(Italy) Asystel Novara	S
19	Immacolata Sirressi	175 cm (5 ft 9 in)	62 kg (137 lb; 9.8 st)	(Italy) Florens Castellana Grotte	L
20	Carolina del Pilar Costagrande	188 cm (6 ft 2 in)	80 kg (180 lb; 13 st)	(Russia) Dynamo Moscow	OH/OP

Coach: Massimo Barbolini

==== Kenya ====
No	Player	Height	Weight	Club	Position
1	Jane Wairimu	174 cm (5 ft 8 1/2 in)	58 kg (128 lb; 9.1 st)	Kenya Prisons	
2	Everlyne Makuto	181 cm (5 ft 11 1/2 in)	75 kg (165 lb; 11.8 st)	Kenya Prisons	
3	Asha Makuto	175 cm (5 ft 9 in)	68 kg (150 lb; 10.7 st)	Kenya Pipeline Company	
4	Esther Mwombe	175 cm (5 ft 9 in)	68 kg (150 lb; 10.7 st)	Kenya Prisons	
5	Diana Khisa	180 cm (5 ft 11 in)	73 kg (161 lb; 11.5 st)	Kenya Prisons	
6	Florence Bosire	175 cm (5 ft 9 in)	57 kg (126 lb; 9.0 st)	Kenya Prisons	
7	Jannet Wanja	175 cm (5 ft 9 in)	59 kg (130 lb; 9.3 st)	(Rwanda) APR	
8	Mildred Odwako	175 cm (5 ft 9 in)	63 kg (139 lb; 9.9 st)	Kenya Pipeline Company	
9	Joan Kibor	184 cm (6 ft 1/2 in)	68 kg (150 lb; 10.7 st)	Kenya Prisons	
10	Roseline Odhiambo	179 cm (5 ft 10 1/2 in)	71 kg (157 lb; 11.2 st)	Kenya Pipeline Company	
11	Jackline Barasa	180 cm (5 ft 11 in)	86 kg (190 lb; 13.5 st)	Kenya Commercial Bank	
12	Lydia Maiyo	185 cm (6 ft 1 in)	74 kg (163 lb; 11.7 st)	Kenya Prisons	
13	Loice Tarus	178 cm (5 ft 10 in)	60 kg (130 lb; 9.4 st)	Kenya Prisons	
14	Mercy Moim	183 cm (6 ft 0 in)	70 kg (150 lb; 11 st)	Kenya Prisons	
15	Brackcides Khadambi	180 cm (5 ft 11 in)	69 kg (152 lb; 10.9 st)	Kenya Prisons	
16	Judith Tarus	150 cm (4 ft 11 in)	59 kg (130 lb; 9.3 st)	Kenya Prisons	
17	Edinah Rotich	180 cm (5 ft 11 in)	73 kg (161 lb; 11.5 st)	(India) Friends Volleyball Club	
18	Elizabeth Wanyama	174 cm (5 ft 8 1/2 in)	68 kg (150 lb; 10.7 st)	Kenya Prisons	
19	Bilha Chepchirchir	168 cm (5 ft 6 in)	57 kg (126 lb; 9.0 st)	(Kenya) Blue Triangle	
20	Rodah Lyali	169 cm (5 ft 6 1/2 in)	72 kg (159 lb; 11.3 st)	Kenya Pipeline Company	

Coach: (Japan) Hidehiro Irisawa

==== Netherlands ====
No	Player	Height	Weight	Club	Position
1	Kim Staelens	184 cm (6 ft 1/2 in)	78 kg (172 lb; 12.3 st)		S
2	Femke Stoltenborg	190 cm (6 ft 3 in)	73 kg (161 lb; 11.5 st)	(Netherlands) TVC Amstelveen	S
3	Francien Huurman	194 cm (6 ft 4 1/2 in)	80 kg (180 lb; 13 st)		MB
4	Chaïne Staelens	194 cm (6 ft 4 1/2 in)	77 kg (170 lb; 12.1 st)	(Japan) Denso Airybees	OH
5	Robin de Kruijf	193 cm (6 ft 4 in)	81 kg (179 lb; 12.8 st)		MB
6	Maret Grothues	180 cm (5 ft 11 in)	67 kg (148 lb; 10.6 st)		OH
7	Quinta Steenbergen	189 cm (6 ft 2 1/2 in)	75 kg (165 lb; 11.8 st)	(Netherlands) TVC Amstelveen	MB
8	Alice Blom	178 cm (5 ft 10 in)	64 kg (141 lb; 10.1 st)	(Azerbaijan) Azerrail Baku	OH
9	Myrthe Schoot	184 cm (6 ft 1/2 in)	71 kg (157 lb; 11.2 st)		L
10	Janneke van Tienen	177 cm (5 ft 9 1/2 in)	73 kg (161 lb; 11.5 st)		L
11	Caroline Wensink	187 cm (6 ft 1 1/2 in)	78 kg (172 lb; 12.3 st)	(Poland) Muszynianka Fakro Muszyna	MB/OH
12	Manon Flier	193 cm (6 ft 4 in)	73 kg (161 lb; 11.5 st)	(Italy) Robursport Volley Pesaro	OP
13	Anne Buijs	191 cm (6 ft 3 in)	74 kg (163 lb; 11.7 st)	(Belgium) Asterix Kieldrecht	OH/OP
14	Laura Dijkema	184 cm (6 ft 1/2 in)	71 kg (157 lb; 11.2 st)		S
15	Ingrid Visser	191 cm (6 ft 3 in)	71 kg (157 lb; 11.2 st)	(Spain) CAV Murcia 2005	MB
16	Debby Stam	184 cm (6 ft 1/2 in)	68 kg (150 lb; 10.7 st)	(Poland) Muszynianka Fakro Muszyna	OH
17	Nicole Koolhaas	198 cm (6 ft 6 in)	77 kg (170 lb; 12.1 st)	(France) Vandoeuvre Nancy Volley Ball	OP
18	Judith Blansjaar	177 cm (5 ft 9 1/2 in)	73 kg (161 lb; 11.5 st)	(Netherlands) TVC Amstelveen	S

Coach: Avital Selinger

==== Puerto Rico ====
No	Player	Height	Weight	Club	Position
1	Debora Seilhamer	182 cm (5 ft 11 1/2 in)	68 kg (150 lb; 10.7 st)	(Puerto Rico) Indias de Mayagüez	L
2	Pamela Cartagena	188 cm (6 ft 2 in)	55 kg (121 lb; 8.7 st)	(Puerto Rico) Pinkin de Corozal	OP/OH
3	Vilmarie Mojica	177 cm (5 ft 9 1/2 in)	63 kg (139 lb; 9.9 st)	(Puerto Rico) Pinkin de Corozal	S
4	Tatiana Encarnación	182 cm (5 ft 11 1/2 in)	72 kg (159 lb; 11.3 st)	(Puerto Rico) Gigantes de Carolina	OH
5	Sarai Álvarez	189 cm (6 ft 2 1/2 in)	61 kg (134 lb; 9.6 st)	(Puerto Rico) Indias de Mayagüez	OP
6	Yarimar Rosa	188 cm (6 ft 2 in)	58 kg (128 lb; 9.1 st)	(Puerto Rico) National Team	OH
7	Stephanie Enright	182 cm (5 ft 11 1/2 in)	64 kg (141 lb; 10.1 st)	(Puerto Rico) National Team	OH
8	Noami Santos	193 cm (6 ft 4 in)	63 kg (139 lb; 9.9 st)	(Puerto Rico) National Team	OH/MB
9	Áurea Cruz	182 cm (5 ft 11 1/2 in)	63 kg (139 lb; 9.9 st)	(Italy) MC Carnaghi Villa Cortese	OH
10	Génesis Collazo	186 cm (6 ft 1 in)	74 kg (163 lb; 11.7 st)	(Puerto Rico) Pinkin de Corozal	MB
11	Karina Ocasio	195 cm (6 ft 5 in)	76 kg (168 lb; 12.0 st)	(Turkey) Galatasaray Medical Park	OH/OP
12	Michelle Nogueras	182 cm (5 ft 11 1/2 in)	58 kg (128 lb; 9.1 st)	(Puerto Rico) Criollas de Caguas	S
13	Darangelys Yantin	188 cm (6 ft 2 in)	60 kg (130 lb; 9.4 st)	(Puerto Rico) Pinkin de Corozal	MB/OH
14	Glorimar Ortega	179 cm (5 ft 10 1/2 in)	70 kg (150 lb; 11 st)	(Puerto Rico) Gigantes de Carolina	S
15	Shara Venegas	182 cm (5 ft 11 1/2 in)	68 kg (150 lb; 10.7 st)	(Puerto Rico) Llaneras de Toa Baja	L
16	Alexandra Oquendo	189 cm (6 ft 2 1/2 in)	75 kg (165 lb; 11.8 st)	(Puerto Rico) Criollas de Caguas	MB
17	Sheila Ocasio	196 cm (6 ft 5 in)	74 kg (163 lb; 11.7 st)	(Puerto Rico) Valencianas de Juncos	MB
19	Wilnelia González	183 cm (6 ft 0 in)	65 kg (143 lb; 10.2 st)	(Puerto Rico) Vaqueras de Bayamón	MB

Coach: (Argentina) Carlos Cardona

=== Pool C ===
==== Croatia ====
No	Player	Height	Weight	Club	Position
1	Zrinka Tomić	177 cm (5 ft 9 1/2 in)	63 kg (139 lb; 9.9 st)	(Croatia) ŽOK Cestorad	S
2	Ana Grbac	187 cm (6 ft 1 1/2 in)	64 kg (141 lb; 10.1 st)	(Switzerland) Voléro Zürich	S
3	Cecilia Dujić	184 cm (6 ft 1/2 in)	71 kg (157 lb; 11.2 st)	(Croatia) ŽOK Split 1700	OH/OP
4	Marina Miletić	180 cm (5 ft 11 in)	67 kg (148 lb; 10.6 st)	(Croatia) ŽOK Rijeka	OH
5	Mirela Delić	188 cm (6 ft 2 in)	80 kg (180 lb; 13 st)	(Azerbaijan) Rabita Baku	MB
6	Sanja Popović	186 cm (6 ft 1 in)	76 kg (168 lb; 12.0 st)	(Italy) Pallavolo Sirio Perugia	OP/OH
7	Mia Todorović	169 cm (5 ft 6 1/2 in)	62 kg (137 lb; 9.8 st)	(Croatia) ŽOK Rijeka	L
8	Mia Jerkov	192 cm (6 ft 3 1/2 in)	68 kg (150 lb; 10.7 st)	(South Korea) HeungKuk Life Insurance	OH
9	Ilijana Dugandžić	189 cm (6 ft 2 1/2 in)	71 kg (157 lb; 11.2 st)		MB
10	Bernarda Brčić	192 cm (6 ft 3 1/2 in)	81 kg (179 lb; 12.8 st)	(Croatia) ŽOK Rijeka	S
11	Katarina Barun	183 cm (6 ft 0 in)	84 kg (185 lb; 13.2 st)	(Italy) Asystel Volley Novara	OP
12	Senna Ušić Jogunica	191 cm (6 ft 3 in)	78 kg (172 lb; 12.3 st)	(Italy) Scavolini Pesaro	OH
13	Marina Katić	183 cm (6 ft 0 in)	84 kg (185 lb; 13.2 st)	(Romania) VC 2004 Tomis Constanta	S
14	Mirela Bareš	170 cm (5 ft 7 in)	60 kg (130 lb; 9.4 st)	(Croatia) ŽOK Cestorad	L
15	Ivana Miloš	187 cm (6 ft 1 1/2 in)	70 kg (150 lb; 11 st)	(Croatia) ŽOK Rijeka	MB
16	Hana Čutura	191 cm (6 ft 3 in)	83 kg (183 lb; 13.1 st)	(Germany) USC Münster	OH
17	Jelena Alajbeg	183 cm (6 ft 0 in)	75 kg (165 lb; 11.8 st)	(Switzerland) Voléro Zürich	OP/OH
18	Maja Poljak	194 cm (6 ft 4 1/2 in)	80 kg (180 lb; 13 st)	(Turkey) VakıfBank	MB
19	Matea Ikić	185 cm (6 ft 1 in)	79 kg (174 lb; 12.4 st)	(Poland) MKS Dąbrowa Górnicza	OH

Coach: Miroslav Aksentijević

==== Cuba ====
No	Player	Height	Weight	Club	Position
1	Wilma Salas Rosell	188 cm (6 ft 2 in)	60 kg (130 lb; 9.4 st)	Santiago de Cuba	OH
2	Yanelis Santos Allegne	181 cm (5 ft 11 1/2 in)	69 kg (152 lb; 10.9 st)	(Cuba) Ciego de Ávila	OP/S
3	Alena Rojas Orta	186 cm (6 ft 1 in)	78 kg (172 lb; 12.3 st)	(Cuba) Ciudad de la Habana	MB
4	Yoana Palacio Mendoza	184 cm (6 ft 1/2 in)	67 kg (148 lb; 10.6 st)	(Cuba) Ciudad Habana	OH
5	Yunieska Batista Robles	185 cm (6 ft 1 in)	70 kg (150 lb; 11 st)	(Cuba) Isla de la Juventud	U
6	Daymara Lescay Cajigal	184 cm (6 ft 1/2 in)	72 kg (159 lb; 11.3 st)	(Cuba) Guantanamo	MB
7	Lisbet Arredondo Reyes	181 cm (5 ft 11 1/2 in)	62 kg (137 lb; 9.8 st)	(Cuba) Villa Clara	L
8	Emily Borrell Cruz	167 cm (5 ft 5 1/2 in)	55 kg (121 lb; 8.7 st)	(Cuba) Villa Clara	L
9	Rachel Sánchez Pérez	188 cm (6 ft 2 in)	75 kg (165 lb; 11.8 st)	(Cuba) Pinar del Río	MB
10	Ana Lidia Cleger Abel	183 cm (6 ft 0 in)	69 kg (152 lb; 10.9 st)	Santiago de Cuba	S/OP
11	Leanny Castañeda Simon	188 cm (6 ft 2 in)	70 kg (150 lb; 11 st)	(Cuba) Guantánamo	MB
12	Rosir Calderón Díaz	191 cm (6 ft 3 in)	70 kg (150 lb; 11 st)	(Cuba) Ciudad de la Habana	OH/OP
13	Rosanna Giel Ramos	187 cm (6 ft 1 1/2 in)	62 kg (137 lb; 9.8 st)	(Cuba) Ciego de Ávila	MB
14	Kenia Carcaces Opón	189 cm (6 ft 2 1/2 in)	69 kg (152 lb; 10.9 st)	(Cuba) Holguín	OH
15	Yusidey Silie Frómeta	184 cm (6 ft 1/2 in)	77 kg (170 lb; 12.1 st)	(Cuba) Ciudad de la Habana	S/OP
16	Yudit Pumariega de León	186 cm (6 ft 1 in)	65 kg (143 lb; 10.2 st)	(Cuba) Cienfuegos	U
17	Gyselle de la Caridad Silva Franco	184 cm (6 ft 1/2 in)	70 kg (150 lb; 11 st)	Santiago de Cuba	OP/MB
18	Dayesi Maso Casales	184 cm (6 ft 1/2 in)	69 kg (152 lb; 10.9 st)	(Cuba) Camagüey	U
19	Jennifer Álvarez Hernández	184 cm (6 ft 1/2 in)	72 kg (159 lb; 11.3 st)	(Cuba) Cienfuegos	U

Coach: Juan Gala

==== Germany ====
No	Player	Height	Weight	Club	Position
1	Lenka Dürr	171 cm (5 ft 7 1/2 in)	59 kg (130 lb; 9.3 st)	(Germany) Rote Raben Vilsiburg	L
2	Kathleen Weiß	173 cm (5 ft 8 in)	66 kg (146 lb; 10.4 st)	(Azerbaijan) Igtisadchi Baku	S
3	Denise Hanke	180 cm (5 ft 11 in)	58 kg (128 lb; 9.1 st)	(Germany) Schweriner SC	S
4	Kerstin Tzscherlich	179 cm (5 ft 10 1/2 in)	72 kg (159 lb; 11.3 st)	(Germany) Dresdner SC	L
5	Lena Möllers	188 cm (6 ft 2 in)	78 kg (172 lb; 12.3 st)	(Germany) Rote Raben Vilsiburg	S
6	Saskia Hippe	186 cm (6 ft 1 in)	76 kg (168 lb; 12.0 st)	(Germany) Dresdner SC	OP/OH
7	Patricia Grohmann	186 cm (6 ft 1 in)	80 kg (180 lb; 13 st)	(Germany) SC Podstam	OH
8	Kathy Radzuweit	198 cm (6 ft 6 in)	76 kg (168 lb; 12.0 st)	(Germany) VT Aurubis Hamburg	MB
9	Corina Ssuschke	189 cm (6 ft 2 1/2 in)	75 kg (165 lb; 11.8 st)	(Czech Republic) VK Prostejov	OP/OH
10	Anne Matthes	182 cm (5 ft 11 1/2 in)	66 kg (146 lb; 10.4 st)	(Italy) PVF Matera	OH
11	Christiane Fürst	193 cm (6 ft 4 in)	76 kg (168 lb; 12.0 st)	(Turkey) Fenerbahçe Acıbadem	MB
12	Heike Beier	184 cm (6 ft 1/2 in)	73 kg (161 lb; 11.5 st)	(Russia) Leningradka Saint Petersburg	OH
13	Tatjana Zautys	182 cm (5 ft 11 1/2 in)	71 kg (157 lb; 11.2 st)	(Germany) Rote Raben Vilsiburg	OP/OH
14	Margareta Kozuch	187 cm (6 ft 1 1/2 in)	70 kg (150 lb; 11 st)	(Russia) Zarechie Odintsovo	OP/OH
15	Maren Brinker	184 cm (6 ft 1/2 in)	68 kg (150 lb; 10.7 st)	(Germany) Allianz Volley Stuttgart	OH
16	Anja Brandt	196 cm (6 ft 5 in)	77 kg (170 lb; 12.1 st)	(Germany) Schweriner SC	MB
17	Lisa Thomsen	174 cm (5 ft 8 1/2 in)	68 kg (150 lb; 10.7 st)	(Germany) Schweriner SC	L/R
18	Nadja Schaus	187 cm (6 ft 1 1/2 in)	66 kg (146 lb; 10.4 st)	(Germany) Schweriner SC	MB/OH
19	Janine Volker	178 cm (5 ft 10 in)	69 kg (152 lb; 10.9 st)	(Germany) Schweriner SC	L/OH
20	Mareen Apitz	191 cm (6 ft 3 in)	75 kg (165 lb; 11.8 st)	(Germany) Dresdner SC	S

Coach: (Italy) Giovanni Guidetti

==== Kazakhstan ====
No	Player	Height	Weight	Club	Position
1	Natalya Zhukova	184 cm (6 ft 1/2 in)	72 kg (159 lb; 11.3 st)		MB
2	Tatyana Pyurova	182 cm (5 ft 11 1/2 in)	67 kg (148 lb; 10.6 st)	(Kazakhstan) Zhetyssu Almaty	OH/OP
3	Sana Jarlagassova	189 cm (6 ft 2 1/2 in)	77 kg (170 lb; 12.1 st)	(Kazakhstan) Almaty	OH
4	Olga Karpova	184 cm (6 ft 1/2 in)	65 kg (143 lb; 10.2 st)	(Kazakhstan) Zhetyssu Almaty	MB/OH
5	Olga Nassedkina	190 cm (6 ft 3 in)	77 kg (170 lb; 12.1 st)	(Kazakhstan) Zhetyssu Almaty	MB
6	Olessya Arslanova	187 cm (6 ft 1 1/2 in)	71 kg (157 lb; 11.2 st)	(Kazakhstan) Zhetyssu Almaty	OH/MB
7	Alena Omelchenko	195 cm (6 ft 5 in)	78 kg (172 lb; 12.3 st)	(Kazakhstan) Zhetyssu Almaty	MB
8	Korinna Ishimtseva	184 cm (6 ft 1/2 in)	73 kg (161 lb; 11.5 st)	(Kazakhstan) Zhetyssu Almaty	S
9	Irina Lukomskaya	175 cm (5 ft 9 in)	73 kg (161 lb; 11.5 st)	(Kazakhstan) Almaty	S
10	Yelena Ezau	174 cm (5 ft 8 1/2 in)	57 kg (126 lb; 9.0 st)	(Kazakhstan) Irtysh-Kazchrome	L
11	Marina Storozhenko	175 cm (5 ft 9 in)	60 kg (130 lb; 9.4 st)	(Kazakhstan) Zhetyssu Almaty	L
12	Irina Zaitseva	185 cm (6 ft 1 in)	68 kg (150 lb; 10.7 st)	(Kazakhstan) Zhetyssu Almaty	OH
13	Yuliya Kutsko	190 cm (6 ft 3 in)	76 kg (168 lb; 12.0 st)	(Azerbaijan) Lokomotiv Baku	OP
14	Yana Petrenko	180 cm (5 ft 11 in)	70 kg (150 lb; 11 st)	(Kazakhstan) Astana	MB
15	Lyudmila Anarbayeva	192 cm (6 ft 3 1/2 in)	72 kg (159 lb; 11.3 st)	(Kazakhstan) Zhetyssu Almaty	MB/OH
16	Inna Matveyeva	186 cm (6 ft 1 in)	74 kg (163 lb; 11.7 st)	(Russia) Samarodok Khabarovsk	OP
17	Olga Drobyshevskaya	185 cm (6 ft 1 in)	75 kg (165 lb; 11.8 st)	(Kazakhstan) Zhetyssu Almaty	OP/OH
18	Alexandra Issayeva	180 cm (5 ft 11 in)	78 kg (172 lb; 12.3 st)	(Azerbaijan) Rabita Baku	S
19	Zarina Sitkazinova	182 cm (5 ft 11 1/2 in)	68 kg (150 lb; 10.7 st)	(Kazakhstan) Gracia KZ	MB

Coach: Nelli Chsherbakova

==== Thailand ====
No	Player	Height	Weight	Club	Position
1	Piyanut Pannoy	173 cm (5 ft 8 in)	68 kg (150 lb; 10.7 st)	(Thailand) Federbrau	L
2	Yupa Sanitklang	167 cm (5 ft 5 1/2 in)	60 kg (130 lb; 9.4 st)	(Thailand) Federbrau	L
3	Rasamee Supamool	180 cm (5 ft 11 in)	68 kg (150 lb; 10.7 st)	(Thailand) Federbrau	OH/OP
4	Hattaya Bamrungsuk	180 cm (5 ft 11 in)	62 kg (137 lb; 9.8 st)	(Thailand) Federbrau	MB
5	Pleumjit Thinkaow	180 cm (5 ft 11 in)	63 kg (139 lb; 9.9 st)	(Thailand) Federbrau	MB
6	Onuma Sittirak	176 cm (5 ft 9 1/2 in)	72 kg (159 lb; 11.3 st)	(Thailand) Federbrau	OP/OH
7	Patcharee Deesamer	180 cm (5 ft 11 in)	74 kg (163 lb; 11.7 st)	(Thailand) Federbrau	MB
8	Utaiwan Kaensing	190 cm (6 ft 3 in)	86 kg (190 lb; 13.5 st)	(Thailand) Federbrau	MB
9	Jurairat Ponleka	181 cm (5 ft 11 1/2 in)	65 kg (143 lb; 10.2 st)	(Thailand) Federbrau	S
10	Wilavan Apinyapong	174 cm (5 ft 8 1/2 in)	68 kg (150 lb; 10.7 st)	(Thailand) Federbrau	OH
11	Amporn Hyapha	180 cm (5 ft 11 in)	70 kg (150 lb; 11 st)	(Thailand) Federbrau	MB
12	Kamonporn Sukmak	174 cm (5 ft 8 1/2 in)	63 kg (139 lb; 9.9 st)	(Thailand) Federbrau	S
13	Nootsara Tomkom	170 cm (5 ft 7 in)	57 kg (126 lb; 9.0 st)	(Thailand) Federbrau	S
14	Sutadta Chuewulim	172 cm (5 ft 7 1/2 in)	62 kg (137 lb; 9.8 st)	(Thailand) Federbrau	OH/OP
15	Malika Kanthong	178 cm (5 ft 10 in)	63 kg (139 lb; 9.9 st)	(Thailand) Federbrau	OH
16	Sontaya Keawbundit	178 cm (5 ft 10 in)	68 kg (150 lb; 10.7 st)	(Thailand) Federbrau	OH
17	Wanitchaya Luangtonglang	178 cm (5 ft 10 in)	51 kg (112 lb; 8.0 st)	(Thailand) Federbrau	OH
18	Em-orn Phanusit	179 cm (5 ft 10 1/2 in)	70 kg (150 lb; 11 st)	(Thailand) Federbrau	OP/MB
19	Tapaphaipun Chaisri	168 cm (5 ft 6 in)	60 kg (130 lb; 9.4 st)	(Thailand) Federbrau	L

Coach: Kiattipong Radchatagriengkai

==== United States ====
No	Player	Height	Weight	Club	Position
1	Ogonna Nnamani	186 cm (6 ft 1 in)	80 kg (180 lb; 13 st)	(Czech Republic) VK Prostějov	OP/OH
2	Alisha Glass	184 cm (6 ft 1/2 in)	72 kg (159 lb; 11.3 st)	(United States) US National Team	S
3	Christa Harmotto	188 cm (6 ft 2 in)	79 kg (174 lb; 12.4 st)	(China) Evergrande Guangdong	MB
4	Lindsey Berg	176 cm (5 ft 9 1/2 in)	75 kg (165 lb; 11.8 st)	(Italy) Asystel Novara	S
5	Stacy Sykora	178 cm (5 ft 10 in)	61 kg (134 lb; 9.6 st)	(United States) US National Team	L
6	Nicole Davis	168 cm (5 ft 6 in)	73 kg (161 lb; 11.5 st)	(Azerbaijan) Lokomotiv Baku	L
7	Heather Bown	188 cm (6 ft 2 in)	90 kg (200 lb; 14 st)	(Italy) Giannino Pieralsi Volley Jesi	MB
8	Cynthia Barboza	183 cm (6 ft 0 in)	68 kg (150 lb; 10.7 st)	(Japan) Toray Arrows	OH
9	Jennifer Tamas (C)	191 cm (6 ft 3 in)	82 kg (181 lb; 12.9 st)	(Puerto Rico) Llaneras de Toa Baja	MB
10	Kimberly Glass	190 cm (6 ft 3 in)	75 kg (165 lb; 11.8 st)	(United States) US National Team	OH
11	Jordan Larson	190 cm (6 ft 3 in)	75 kg (165 lb; 11.8 st)	(Puerto Rico) Vaqueras de Bayamón	OH/OP
12	Nancy Metcalf	187 cm (6 ft 1 1/2 in)	73 kg (161 lb; 11.5 st)	(Turkey) Eczacıbaşı İstanbul	OP/OH
13	Lauren Paolini	193 cm (6 ft 4 in)	73 kg (161 lb; 11.5 st)	(United States) University of Texas	MB
14	Nicole Fawcett	196 cm (6 ft 5 in)	82 kg (181 lb; 12.9 st)	(Russia) VC Dynamo-Yantar Kaliningrad	OP/OH
15	Logan Tom	186 cm (6 ft 1 in)	80 kg (180 lb; 13 st)	(China) Evergrande Guangdong	OH
16	Foluke Akinradewo	191 cm (6 ft 3 in)	79 kg (174 lb; 12.4 st)	(United States) US National Team	MB
17	Mary Spicer	175 cm (5 ft 9 in)	65 kg (143 lb; 10.2 st)	(Poland) Centrostal Bydgoszcz	S
18	Megan Hodge	194 cm (6 ft 4 1/2 in)	80 kg (180 lb; 13 st)	(Puerto Rico) Criollas de Caguas	OH
19	Destinee Hooker	196 cm (6 ft 5 in)	73 kg (161 lb; 11.5 st)	(South Korea) GS Seoul Kixx	OP
20	Angela Pressey	173 cm (5 ft 8 in)	74 kg (163 lb; 11.7 st)	(United States) US National Team	OH/L

Coach: (New Zealand) Hugh McCutcheon

=== Pool D ===
==== Canada ====
No.	Name	Date of birth	Height	Weight	Spike	Block	2010 club
1	Tricia Mayba	2 July 1989	186 cm (6 ft 1 in)	76 kg (168 lb; 12.0 st)	306 cm (120 in)	290 cm (110 in)	University of Manitoba
2	Julie Young	7 March 1986	188 cm (6 ft 2 in)	72 kg (159 lb; 11.3 st)	287 cm (113 in)	273 cm (107 in)	Team Canada
3	Janie Guimond	11 April 1984	165 cm (5 ft 5 in)	64 kg (141 lb; 10.1 st)	284 cm (112 in)	263 cm (104 in)	Team Canada
4	Tammy Louise Mahon	4 November 1980	180 cm (5 ft 11 in)	76 kg (168 lb; 12.0 st)	298 cm (117 in)	282 cm (111 in)	Panathinaikos
5	Tiffany Dodds	21 January 1986	192 cm (6 ft 3 1/2 in)	84 kg (185 lb; 13.2 st)	309 cm (122 in)	302 cm (119 in)	Ageo Mdeicss
6	Claire Hanna	27 April 1986	182 cm (5 ft 11 1/2 in)	62 kg (137 lb; 9.8 st)	292 cm (115 in)	278 cm (109 in)	Team Canada
7	Tonya Mokelki	10 May 1985	182 cm (5 ft 11 1/2 in)	67 kg (148 lb; 10.6 st)	309 cm (122 in)	288 cm (113 in)	SV Sinsheim
8	Carla Bradstock	11 August 1985	178 cm (5 ft 10 in)	68 kg (150 lb; 10.7 st)	282 cm (111 in)	271 cm (107 in)	Team Canada
9	Sarah Pavan	16 August 1986	196 cm (6 ft 5 in)	73 kg (161 lb; 11.5 st)	314 cm (124 in)	302 cm (119 in)	Korea Expressway
10	Marisa Field	10 July 1987	189 cm (6 ft 2 1/2 in)	71 kg (157 lb; 11.2 st)	309 cm (122 in)	291 cm (115 in)	SV Sinsheim
11	Nadine Alphonse	22 July 1983	186 cm (6 ft 1 in)	70 kg (150 lb; 11 st)	312 cm (123 in)	302 cm (119 in)	Team Canada
12	Sherline Holness	11 February 1980	188 cm (6 ft 2 in)	80 kg (180 lb; 13 st)	312 cm (123 in)	295 cm (116 in)	Team Canada
13	Marie-Pier Murray-Methot	23 March 1986	184 cm (6 ft 1/2 in)	86 kg (190 lb; 13.5 st)	305 cm (120 in)	286 cm (113 in)	Team Canada
14	Ashley Voth	24 September 1988	188 cm (6 ft 2 in)	70 kg (150 lb; 11 st)	308 cm (121 in)	283 cm (111 in)	University of Manitoba
16	Jennifer Hinze	20 May 1988	186 cm (6 ft 1 in)	75 kg (165 lb; 11.8 st)	306 cm (120 in)	284 cm (112 in)	University of British Columbia
17	Brittney Page	4 February 1984	184 cm (6 ft 1/2 in)	78 kg (172 lb; 12.3 st)	305 cm (120 in)	287 cm (113 in)	Team Canada
18	Kyla Richey	20 June 1989	188 cm (6 ft 2 in)	79 kg (174 lb; 12.4 st)	302 cm (119 in)	287 cm (113 in)	University of British Columbia
19	Lauren O'Reilly	4 April 1989	178 cm (5 ft 10 in)	69 kg (152 lb; 10.9 st)	293 cm (115 in)	273 cm (107 in)	Trinity Western University
20	Kelci French	28 January 1990	183 cm (6 ft 0 in)	65 kg (143 lb; 10.2 st)	296 cm (117 in)	276 cm (109 in)	Team Canada

==== China ====
No.	Name	Date of birth	Height	Weight	Spike	Block	2010 club
1	Wang Yimei	11 January 1988	190 cm (6 ft 3 in)	90 kg (200 lb; 14 st)	318 cm (125 in)	305 cm (120 in)	Liaoning
2	Zhang Lei	11 January 1985	181 cm (5 ft 11 1/2 in)	71 kg (157 lb; 11.2 st)	316 cm (124 in)	310 cm (120 in)	SHANGHAI
3	Yang Jie	1 March 1994	192 cm (6 ft 3 1/2 in)	72 kg (159 lb; 11.3 st)	308 cm (121 in)	300 cm (120 in)	Shanghai
4	Shen Jingsi	3 May 1989	186 cm (6 ft 1 in)	75 kg (165 lb; 11.8 st)	302 cm (119 in)	294 cm (116 in)	Army
5	Luo Yu	27 February 1987	190 cm (6 ft 3 in)	75 kg (165 lb; 11.8 st)	310 cm (120 in)	300 cm (120 in)	Zhejiang
6	Zhou Suhong	23 April 1979	182 cm (5 ft 11 1/2 in)	73 kg (161 lb; 11.5 st)	310 cm (120 in)	300 cm (120 in)	Zhejiang, CHN
7	Zhang Xian	16 March 1985	167 cm (5 ft 5 1/2 in)	57 kg (126 lb; 9.0 st)	290 cm (110 in)	280 cm (110 in)	Yunnan
8	Wei Qiuyue	26 September 1988	184 cm (6 ft 1/2 in)	65 kg (143 lb; 10.2 st)	305 cm (120 in)	300 cm (120 in)	Tianjin
9	Wang Qian	14 March 1989	172 cm (5 ft 7 1/2 in)	65 kg (143 lb; 10.2 st)	290 cm (110 in)	280 cm (110 in)	Tianjin
10	Li Juan	15 May 1981	187 cm (6 ft 1 1/2 in)	73 kg (161 lb; 11.5 st)	317 cm (125 in)	305 cm (120 in)	Tianjin
11	Xu Yunli	2 August 1987	196 cm (6 ft 5 in)	75 kg (165 lb; 11.8 st)	317 cm (125 in)	315 cm (124 in)	Fujian
12	Xue Ming	23 February 1987	193 cm (6 ft 4 in)	72 kg (159 lb; 11.3 st)	324 cm (128 in)	315 cm (124 in)	Beijing
13	Liu Xiaotong	16 February 1990	188 cm (6 ft 2 in)	73 kg (161 lb; 11.5 st)	306 cm (120 in)	300 cm (120 in)	Beijing
14	Chen Liyi	27 April 1989	184 cm (6 ft 1/2 in)	75 kg (165 lb; 11.8 st)	310 cm (120 in)	290 cm (110 in)	Tianjin
15	Ma Yunwen	19 October 1986	189 cm (6 ft 2 1/2 in)	76 kg (168 lb; 12.0 st)	315 cm (124 in)	307 cm (121 in)	Shanghai
16	Bian Yuqian	14 June 1990	180 cm (5 ft 11 in)	70 kg (150 lb; 11 st)	300 cm (120 in)	292 cm (115 in)	Shanghai
17	Chen Yao	25 September 1988	191 cm (6 ft 3 in)	74 kg (163 lb; 11.7 st)	315 cm (124 in)	305 cm (120 in)	Army
18	Fan Linlin	1 December 1991	190 cm (6 ft 3 in)	77 kg (170 lb; 12.1 st)	316 cm (124 in)	301 cm (119 in)	Army

==== Dominican Republic ====
No	Player	Height	Weight	Club	Position
1	Annerys Vargas Valdez	195 cm (6 ft 5 in)	70 kg (150 lb; 11 st)	(Dominican Republic) Seleccion Nacional	MB
2	Rossy Dahiana Burgos Herrera	180 cm (5 ft 11 in)	70 kg (150 lb; 11 st)	(Dominican Republic) Seleccion Nacional	OH/OP
3	Lisvel Elisa Eve Mejía	194 cm (6 ft 4 1/2 in)	70 kg (150 lb; 11 st)	(Dominican Republic) Deportivo Nacional	MB/OH
4	Marianne Fersola Norberto	190 cm (6 ft 3 in)	60 kg (130 lb; 9.4 st)	(Dominican Republic) Mirador	MB
5	Brenda Castillo	168 cm (5 ft 6 in)	55 kg (121 lb; 8.7 st)	(Dominican Republic) San Cristóbal	L
6	Carmen Rosa Caso Sierra	168 cm (5 ft 6 in)	59 kg (130 lb; 9.3 st)	(Dominican Republic) Arlenis Cordero	L
7	Niverka Dharlenis Marte Frica	180 cm (5 ft 11 in)	71 kg (157 lb; 11.2 st)	(Dominican Republic) Deportivo Nacional	S
8	Cándida Estefany Arias Pérez	191 cm (6 ft 3 in)	68 kg (150 lb; 10.7 st)	(Dominican Republic) San Cristóbal	MB
9	Sidarka de los Milagros Núñez	188 cm (6 ft 2 in)	62 kg (137 lb; 9.8 st)	(Dominican Republic) Liga Juan Guzmán	OP/OH
10	Milagros Cabral de la Cruz	181 cm (5 ft 11 1/2 in)	63 kg (139 lb; 9.9 st)	(Dominican Republic) Los Cachorros	OH
11	Jeoselyna Rodríguez Santos	184 cm (6 ft 1/2 in)	63 kg (139 lb; 9.9 st)	(Dominican Republic) Mirador	OP
12	Karla Miguelina Echenique Medina	181 cm (5 ft 11 1/2 in)	62 kg (137 lb; 9.8 st)	(Dominican Republic) Deportivo Nacional	S
13	Cindy Rondón	183 cm (6 ft 0 in)	61 kg (134 lb; 9.6 st)	(Dominican Republic) Seleccion Nacional	MB
14	Prisilla Rivera Brens	186 cm (6 ft 1 in)	70 kg (150 lb; 11 st)	(Dominican Republic) San Pedro	OH/MB
15	Brayelín Elizabeth Martínez	201 cm (6 ft 7 in)	72 kg (159 lb; 11.3 st)	(Dominican Republic) Mirador	MB
16	Gabriela Alexandra Reyes Hinojosa	175 cm (5 ft 9 in)	77 kg (170 lb; 12.1 st)	(Dominican Republic) Mirador	S
17	Gina Altagracia Mambrú	180 cm (5 ft 11 in)	65 kg (143 lb; 10.2 st)	(Dominican Republic) Los Cachorro	OP
18	Bethania de la Cruz de Peña	190 cm (6 ft 3 in)	70 kg (150 lb; 11 st)	(Dominican Republic) Deportivo Nacional	OH
19	Ana Yorkira Binet Stephens	174 cm (5 ft 8 1/2 in)	58 kg (128 lb; 9.1 st)	(Dominican Republic) Samana	OH/L
20	Marisol Concepción Contreras	191 cm (6 ft 3 in)	75 kg (165 lb; 11.8 st)	(Dominican Republic) Monte Plata	OH

Coach: (Brazil) Marcos Kwiek

==== Russia ====
No	Player	Height	Weight	Club	Position
1	Maria Borodakova	190 cm (6 ft 3 in)	80 kg (180 lb; 13 st)	(Russia) Dinamo Kazan	MB
2	Lesya Makhno	188 cm (6 ft 2 in)	73 kg (161 lb; 11.5 st)	(Russia) WVC Dynamo Moscow	OH/OP
3	Maria Perepelkina	187 cm (6 ft 1 1/2 in)	72 kg (159 lb; 11.3 st)	(Russia) WVC Dynamo Moscow	MB
4	Elena Murtazaeva	190 cm (6 ft 3 in)	73 kg (161 lb; 11.5 st)	(Russia) Dinamo Krasnodar	MB
5	Lioubov Shashkova	193 cm (6 ft 4 in)	72 kg (159 lb; 11.3 st)	(Turkey) Fenerbahçe Acıbadem	OH/OP
6	Ksenia Naumova	190 cm (6 ft 3 in)	73 kg (161 lb; 11.5 st)	(Russia) Zarechie Odintsovo	OH/OP
7	Svetlana Kryuchkova	174 cm (5 ft 8 1/2 in)	63 kg (139 lb; 9.9 st)	(Russia) WVC Dynamo Moscow	L
8	Nataliya Goncharova	196 cm (6 ft 5 in)	75 kg (165 lb; 11.8 st)	(Russia) WVC Dynamo Moscow	OP/OH
9	Olga Fateeva	190 cm (6 ft 3 in)	72 kg (159 lb; 11.3 st)	(Italy) Sirio Perugia	OP/OH
10	Daria Vekshina	170 cm (5 ft 7 in)	59 kg (130 lb; 9.3 st)	(Russia) Omichka Omsk	L
11	Yekaterina Gamova	206 cm (6 ft 9 in)	80 kg (180 lb; 13 st)	(Russia) Dinamo Kazan	OP/OH
12	Vera Ulyakina	180 cm (5 ft 11 in)	73 kg (161 lb; 11.5 st)	(Russia) Dinamo Kazan	S
13	Yevgeniya Startseva	186 cm (6 ft 1 in)	68 kg (150 lb; 10.7 st)	(Russia) Dinamo Krasnodar	S
14	Ekaterina Kabeshova	174 cm (5 ft 8 1/2 in)	61 kg (134 lb; 9.6 st)	(Russia) Dinamo Kazan	L
15	Tatiana Kosheleva	191 cm (6 ft 3 in)	67 kg (148 lb; 10.6 st)	(Russia) Dinamo Kazan	OP/OH
16	Yulia Merkulova	205 cm (6 ft 8 1/2 in)	75 kg (165 lb; 11.8 st)	(Russia) WVC Dynamo Moscow	MB
17	Ekaterina Bogacheva	185 cm (6 ft 1 in)	73 kg (161 lb; 11.5 st)	(Russia) Zarechie Odintsovo	MB
18	Liudmila Malofeeva	190 cm (6 ft 3 in)	80 kg (180 lb; 13 st)	(Russia) Omichka Omsk	OP
19	Irina Uraleva	170 cm (5 ft 7 in)	65 kg (143 lb; 10.2 st)	(Russia) Proton Balakovo	S
20	Maria Zhadan	178 cm (5 ft 10 in)	70 kg (150 lb; 11 st)	(Russia) Zarechie Odintsovo	S

Coach: Vladimir Kuzyutkin

==== South Korea ====
No.	Name	Date of birth	Height	Weight	Spike	Block	2010 club
1	Oh Ji-young	11 July 1988	170 cm (5 ft 7 in)	68 kg (150 lb; 10.7 st)	275 cm (108 in)	266 cm (105 in)	Korea Expressway Corp
2	Yoon Hye-suk	19 June 1983	174 cm (5 ft 8 1/2 in)	60 kg (130 lb; 9.4 st)	293 cm (115 in)	283 cm (111 in)	Hyundai
3	Han Soo-ji	1 February 1989	182 cm (5 ft 11 1/2 in)	78 kg (172 lb; 12.3 st)	305 cm (120 in)	296 cm (117 in)	KT&G
4	Kim Sa-nee	21 June 1981	180 cm (5 ft 11 in)	75 kg (165 lb; 11.8 st)	302 cm (119 in)	292 cm (115 in)	Hungkuk Life Insurance Co.
5	La Hea-won	28 June 1986	184 cm (6 ft 1/2 in)	73 kg (161 lb; 11.5 st)	302 cm (119 in)	294 cm (116 in)	GS Caltex
6	Park Jeong-ah	26 March 1993	185 cm (6 ft 1 in)	68 kg (150 lb; 10.7 st)	300 cm (120 in)	290 cm (110 in)	NAMSUNG Women's Highschool
7	Kim Min-ji	25 May 1985	187 cm (6 ft 1 1/2 in)	77 kg (170 lb; 12.1 st)	304 cm (120 in)	296 cm (117 in)	GS Caltex
8	Nam Jie-youn	25 May 1983	172 cm (5 ft 7 1/2 in)	63 kg (139 lb; 9.9 st)	285 cm (112 in)	273 cm (107 in)	GS Caltex
9	Yim Myung-ok	5 May 1986	176 cm (5 ft 9 1/2 in)	65 kg (143 lb; 10.2 st)	278 cm (109 in)	266 cm (105 in)	KT&G
10	Kim Yeon-koung	26 February 1988	193 cm (6 ft 4 in)	73 kg (161 lb; 11.5 st)	307 cm (121 in)	299 cm (118 in)	JT Marvelous
11	Han Yoo-mi	5 February 1982	180 cm (5 ft 11 in)	65 kg (143 lb; 10.2 st)	307 cm (121 in)	297 cm (117 in)	Korea Volleyball Association
12	Han Song-yi	5 September 1984	186 cm (6 ft 1 in)	67 kg (148 lb; 10.6 st)	305 cm (120 in)	298 cm (117 in)	Heungkuk Life Insurance Co.
13	Jung Dae-young	12 August 1981	183 cm (6 ft 0 in)	71 kg (157 lb; 11.2 st)	303 cm (119 in)	292 cm (115 in)	GS Caltex
14	Hwang Youn-joo	13 August 1986	177 cm (5 ft 9 1/2 in)	68 kg (150 lb; 10.7 st)	303 cm (119 in)	294 cm (116 in)	Hyundai
15	Kim Se-young	4 June 1981	190 cm (6 ft 3 in)	72 kg (159 lb; 11.3 st)	309 cm (122 in)	300 cm (120 in)	KT&G
16	Lee So-ra	1 September 1987	177 cm (5 ft 9 1/2 in)	62 kg (137 lb; 9.8 st)	295 cm (116 in)	285 cm (112 in)	Korea Expressway Corp.
17	Yang Hyo-jin	14 December 1989	190 cm (6 ft 3 in)	69 kg (152 lb; 10.9 st)	287 cm (113 in)	280 cm (110 in)	Hyundai
18	Lee Bo-lam	8 August 1988	185 cm (6 ft 1 in)	75 kg (165 lb; 11.8 st)	283 cm (111 in)	274 cm (108 in)	Korea Expressway Corp.
19	Kim Hee-jin	29 April 1991	186 cm (6 ft 1 in)	75 kg (165 lb; 11.8 st)	300 cm (120 in)	295 cm (116 in)	Joongang Women`s High school

==== Turkey ====
No	Player	Height	Weight	Club	Position
1	Özge Kırdar Çemberci	183 cm (6 ft 0 in)	70 kg (150 lb; 11 st)	(Turkey) VB Güneş Sigorta Türk Telekom	S
2	Gülden Kayalar Kuzubaşıoğlu	168 cm (5 ft 6 in)	56 kg (123 lb; 8.8 st)	(Turkey) Eczacıbaşı Zentiva	L
5	Ayşe Gökçen Denkel Zop	193 cm (6 ft 4 in)	81 kg (179 lb; 12.8 st)	(Turkey) Eczacıbaşı Zentiva	MB
7	Elif Nedime Ağca Öner	186 cm (6 ft 1 in)	72 kg (159 lb; 11.3 st)	(Turkey) Eczacıbaşı Zentiva	S
8	Bahar Toksoy	190 cm (6 ft 3 in)	68 kg (150 lb; 10.7 st)	(Turkey) VB Güneş Sigorta Türk Telekom	MB
10	Gözde Kırdar Sonsırma	186 cm (6 ft 1 in)	70 kg (150 lb; 11 st)	(Turkey) VB Güneş Sigorta Türk Telekom	OH
11	Naz Aydemir	186 cm (6 ft 1 in)	68 kg (150 lb; 10.7 st)	(Turkey) Fenerbahçe Acıbadem	S
12	Esra Gümüş	181 cm (5 ft 11 1/2 in)	76 kg (168 lb; 12.0 st)	(Turkey) Eczacıbaşı Zentiva	OH
13	Neriman Özsoy	188 cm (6 ft 2 in)	76 kg (168 lb; 12.0 st)	(Poland) Atom Trefl Sopot	OH
14	Eda Erdem	187 cm (6 ft 1 1/2 in)	75 kg (165 lb; 11.8 st)	(Turkey) Fenerbahçe Acıbadem	MB
16	Seda Tokatlıoğlu	192 cm (6 ft 3 1/2 in)	80 kg (180 lb; 13 st)	(Turkey) Fenerbahçe Acıbadem	OP/OH
17	Neslihan Darnel	187 cm (6 ft 1 1/2 in)	72 kg (159 lb; 11.3 st)	(Turkey) VB Güneş Sigorta Türk Telekom	OP
19	Büşra Cansu	185 cm (6 ft 1 in)	69 kg (152 lb; 10.9 st)	(Turkey) Eczacıbaşı Zentiva	MB
20	Gizem Güreşen	178 cm (5 ft 10 in)	70 kg (150 lb; 11 st)	(Turkey) VB Güneş Sigorta Türk Telekom	L

Coach: Mehmet Nuri Bedestenlioğlu
