= Volleyball at the 2010 Summer Youth Olympics – Girls' tournament =

2010 Summer Youth Olympics
Tournament details
- Host country: Singapore
- Dates: August 21–26, 2010
- Teams: 6
- Venue: Toa Payoh Sports Hall (in Singapore host cities)

Final positions
- Champions: Belgium (1st title)
- Runners-up: United States
- Third place: Peru

Volleyball at the 2010 Summer Youth Olympics took place at the Toa Payoh Sports Hall in Singapore.

== Preliminary round ==
=== Group A ===
Pos	Team	Pld	W	L	Pts	SW	SL	SR	SPW	SPL	SPR
1	Peru	2	2	0	4	6	0	MAX	150	95	1.579
2	Japan	2	1	1	3	3	3	1.000	134	109	1.229
3	Singapore	2	0	2	2	0	6	0.000	70	150	0.467

Date		Score		Set 1	Set 2	Set 3	Set 4	Set 5	Total
21 Aug	Singapore	0–3	Peru	11–25	13–25	12–25			36–75
22 Aug	Singapore	0–3	Japan	9–25	16–25	9–25			34–75
23 Aug	Peru	3–0	Japan	25–22	25–19	25–18			75–59

=== Group B ===
Pos	Team	Pld	W	L	Pts	SW	SL	SR	SPW	SPL	SPR
1	United States	2	2	0	4	6	2	3.000	173	163	1.061
2	Belgium	2	1	1	3	5	3	1.667	178	131	1.359
3	Egypt	2	0	2	2	0	6	0.000	93	150	0.620

Date		Score		Set 1	Set 2	Set 3	Set 4	Set 5	Total
21 Aug	Belgium	3–0	Egypt	25–11	25–12	25–10			75–33
22 Aug	Belgium	2–3	United States	22–25	25–15	20–25	25–18	11–15	103–98
23 Aug	Egypt	0–3	United States	18–25	19–25	23–25			60–75

== Semi-finals ==
Date		Score		Set 1	Set 2	Set 3	Set 4	Set 5	Total
24 Aug	Peru	1–3	Belgium	19–25	25–19	21–25	22–25		87–94
24 Aug	United States	3–0	Japan	25–20	25–23	25–23			75–66

== 5th-place match ==
Date		Score		Set 1	Set 2	Set 3	Set 4	Set 5	Total
25 Aug	Singapore	1–3	Egypt	25–20	18–25	19–25	19–25		81–95

== Bronze-medal match ==
Date		Score		Set 1	Set 2	Set 3	Set 4	Set 5	Total
25 Aug	Peru	3–1	Japan	22–25	30–28	25–11	25–17		102–81

== Final ==
Date		Score		Set 1	Set 2	Set 3	Set 4	Set 5	Total
26 Aug	Belgium	3–1	United States	17–25	25–20	25–18	25–12		92–75

== Medalists ==
Gold	Silver	Bronze
Belgium Laurine Klinkenberg; Laura Heyrman; Delfien Brugman; Elien Ruysschaert; Ilka Van de Vyver (c); Lore Van den Vonder; Sophie Van Nimmen (L); Mira Juwet; Karolien Vleugels; Tara Lauwers; Lotte Penders; Valerie El Houssine Head coach: Julien Van de Vyver	United States Samantha Cash (c); Crystal Graff; Micha Hancock; Natalie Hayes; Christina Higgins; Madison Kamp; Elizabeth McMahon; Katie Mitchell; Tiffany Morales (L); Olivia Okoro; Taylor Simpson; Laura Teknipp Head coach: Rod Wilde	Peru Cary Vasquez; Brenda Daniela Uribe; Grecia Herrada; María de Fátima Acosta (L); Vivian Baella; Alexandra Muñoz; Lisset Sosa; Katerinne Olemar; Raffaella Camet; Diana Gonzales; Clarivett Yllescas (c); Sandra Chumacero Head coach: Natalia Málaga
