= Peru at the 2010 Summer Youth Olympics =

- IOC code: PER
- NOC: Comité Olímpico Peruano
- Website: www.coperu.org (in Spanish)

in Singapore
- Competitors: 26 in 10 sports
- Flag bearer: Kimberly Garcia
- Medals Ranked 84th: Gold 0 Silver 0 Bronze 1 Total 1

Summer Youth Olympics appearances
- 2010; 2014; 2018; 2026

Peru participated at the 2010 Summer Youth Olympics in Singapore.

The Peruvian squad consisted of 26 athletes competing in 10 sports: aquatics (swimming), athletics, badminton, judo, sailing, taekwondo, tennis, volleyball, weightlifting and wrestling.

== Medalists ==
Medal	Name	Sport	Event	Date
Gold	Lesly Cano	Judo	Mixed Team	25 Aug
Bronze	Peru women's youth volleyball team: Clarivet Yllescas; Daniela Uribe; Sandra Chumacero; Mabel Olemar; Raffaella Camet; Vivian Baella; Grecia Herrada; Cary Vasquez; Alexandra Muñoz; Diana Gonzales; Maria de Fatima Acosta; Lisset Sosa	Volleyball	Girls' tournament	25 Aug

== Athletics ==
=== Girls ===
Track and Road Events

Athletes	Event	Qualification		Final	
Athletes	Event	Result	Rank	Result	Rank
Charo Inga	Girls’ 3000m	DSQ qB		DNS	
Kimberly García	Girls’ 5km Walk			23:17.04	7

== Badminton ==
Boys

Athlete	Event	Group Stage				Knock-Out Stage			
Athlete	Event	Match 1	Match 2	Match 3	Rank	Quarterfinal	Semifinal	Final	Rank
Mario Cuba	Boys’ Singles	Richardson (NZL) W 2-0 (21-13, 21-18)	Huang (SIN) L 0-2 (15-21, 10-21)	Bhamidipati (IND) L 0-2 (12-21, 12-21)	3	Did not advance			

Girls

Athlete	Event	Group Stage				Knock-Out Stage			
Athlete	Event	Match 1	Match 2	Match 3	Rank	Quarterfinal	Semifinal	Final	Rank
Katherine Winder	Girls’ Singles	Deng (CHN) L 0-2 (12-21, 5-21)	Suwarno (INA) L 0-2 (9-21, 12-21)	Cheng (NZL) W 2-1 (21-16, 19-21, 21-10)	3	Did not advance			

== Judo ==
Individual

Athlete	Event	Round 1	Round 2	Round 3	Semifinals	Final	Rank
Athlete	Event	Opposition Result	Opposition Result	Opposition Result	Opposition Result	Opposition Result	Rank
Lesly Cano	Girls' -44 kg	BYE	Thakur (IND); W 020-000		Bae (KOR); L 000-100	Bronze Medal Match; Valnova (BLR); L 000-001	5

Team

Team	Event	Round 1	Round 2	Semifinals	Final	Rank
Team	Event	Opposition Result	Opposition Result	Opposition Result	Opposition Result	Rank
Essen; Lesly Cano (PER); Pedro Rivadulla (ESP); Andrea Krisandova (SVK); Kairat Agibayev (KAZ); Daryl Lokuku Ngambomo (COD); Miku Tashiro (JPN); Alex Maxell Garcia Mendoza (CUB)	Mixed Team	Munich; W 4-3	Chiba; W 5-2	Cairo; W 5-2	Belgrade; W 6-1	Gold medal

== Sailing ==
Windsurfing

Athlete	Event	Race											Points	Rank
Athlete	Event	1	2	3	4	5	6	7	8	9	10	M*	Points	Rank
Matias Canseco	Boys' Techno 293	17	12	~~19~~	15	15	15	13	18	15	17	17	154	16
Josefina Roder	Girls' Techno 293	18	18	18	18	17	~~DNF~~	18	17	15	15	15	169	18

== Swimming ==
Athletes	Event	Heat		Semifinal		Final	
Athletes	Event	Time	Position	Time	Position	Time	Position
Sebastian Arispe	Boys’ 100m Freestyle	52.27	22	Did not advance			
Sebastian Arispe	Boys’ 200m Freestyle	1:55.95	25			Did not advance	
Sebastian Arispe	Boys’ 400m Freestyle	4:06.82	19			Did not advance	
Kaori Miyahara	Girls’ 200m Freestyle	2:09.15	27			Did not advance	
Kaori Miyahara	Girls’ 400m Freestyle	4:29.27	17			Did not advance	
Andrea Cedron	Girls’ 200m Freestyle	2:09.59	29			Did not advance	
Andrea Cedron	Girls’ 400m Freestyle	4:27.26	14			Did not advance	

== Taekwondo ==
Athlete	Event	Quarterfinal	Semifinal	Final	Rank
Christian Ocampo	Boys' +73kg	Stefan Bozalo (CAN); L 0-8	did not advance		5

== Tennis ==
Singles

Athlete	Event	Round 1	Round 2	Quarterfinals	Semifinals	Final	Rank
Duilio Beretta	Boys' Singles	Triki (TUN); W 2-0 (6-4, 6-4)	Morrissey (IRL); L 0-2 (2-6, 6-7)	Did not advance			

Doubles

Athlete	Event	Round 1	Quarterfinals	Semifinals	Final	Rank
Duilio Beretta (PER); Juan Sebastián Gómez (COL)	Boys' Doubles	Acosta (ECU); Quiroz (ECU); L 0-2 (0-6, 6-7)	Did not advance			

== Volleyball ==
Squad list	Event	Preliminary		Semifinal	Final	Rank
Squad list	Event	Group A	Rank	Semifinal	Final	Rank
Clarivet Yllescas (C); Brenda Daniela Uribe; Maria de Fatima Acosta; Diana Gonzales; Alexandra Muñoz; Cary Vasquez; Grecia Herrada; Katerinne Olemar; Lisset Sosa; Sandra Chumacero; Raffaella Camet; Vivian Baella	Girls' Volleyball	Singapore; W 3-0	1	Belgium; L 1-3	Japan; W 3-1	Bronze medal
Clarivet Yllescas (C); Brenda Daniela Uribe; Maria de Fatima Acosta; Diana Gonzales; Alexandra Muñoz; Cary Vasquez; Grecia Herrada; Katerinne Olemar; Lisset Sosa; Sandra Chumacero; Raffaella Camet; Vivian Baella	Girls' Volleyball	Japan; W' 3-0	1	Belgium; L 1-3	Japan; W 3-1	Bronze medal

August 21, 2010; 12:30	Singapore	0–3	Peru	Toa Payoh Sports Hall; Attendance: 1,700; Referees: Lourdes Perez Perez (Cuba), Vittorio Sampaolo (Italia)
August 21, 2010; 12:30	(11–25, 13–25, 12–25)			Toa Payoh Sports Hall; Attendance: 1,700; Referees: Lourdes Perez Perez (Cuba), Vittorio Sampaolo (Italia)

August 23, 2010; 12:30	Japan	0–3	Peru	Toa Payoh Sports Hall; Attendance: 1,250; Referees: Brian McDougall (Great Britain), Mary Blalock (United States)
August 23, 2010; 12:30	(22–25, 19–25, 18–25)			Toa Payoh Sports Hall; Attendance: 1,250; Referees: Brian McDougall (Great Britain), Mary Blalock (United States)

August 24, 2010; 10:00	Belgium	3–1	Peru	Toa Payoh Sports Hall; Attendance: 1,300; Referees: Wang Hao Juan (China), Lourdes Perez Perez (Cuba)
August 24, 2010; 10:00	(25–19, 19–25, 25–21, 25–22)			Toa Payoh Sports Hall; Attendance: 1,300; Referees: Wang Hao Juan (China), Lourdes Perez Perez (Cuba)

August 25, 2010; 15:30	Peru	3–1	Japan	Toa Payoh Sports Hall; Attendance: 1,900; Referees: Lourdes Perez Perez (Cuba), Mary Blalock (United States)
August 25, 2010; 15:30	(22–25, 30–28, 25–11, 25–17)			Toa Payoh Sports Hall; Attendance: 1,900; Referees: Lourdes Perez Perez (Cuba), Mary Blalock (United States)

== Weightlifting ==
Athlete	Event	Snatch	Clean & Jerk	Total	Rank
Silvana Saldarriaga	Girls' 58kg	65	93	158	5

== Wrestling ==
Freestyle

Athlete	Event	Pools		Final	Rank
Athlete	Event	Groups	Rank	Final	Rank
Robinson Rios	Boys' 46kg	Davila (VEN); L Fall (0–7)	3	5th Place Match; Abdelnaeem (EGY); L Fall (6–5)	6
Robinson Rios	Boys' 46kg	Sheikh (IRI); L Fall (2–7)	3	5th Place Match; Abdelnaeem (EGY); L Fall (6–5)	6
