= Volleyball at the 2010 Summer Youth Olympics =

Volleyball at the I Summer Youth Olympic Games
- Venue: Toa Payoh Sports Hall
- Dates: 21 – 26 August 2010
- No. of events: 2 (1 boys, 1 girls)
- Competitors: from 12 nations

Volleyball at the 2010 Summer Youth Olympics took place August 21–26 at Toa Payoh Sports Hall in Singapore.

== Teams ==
Continent	Boys	Girls
Europe	Serbia; Russia	Belgium
Africa	Democratic Republic of the Congo	Egypt
Norceca	Cuba	United States
Asia	Iran	Singapore; Japan
South America	Argentina	Peru

== Medal summary ==
Event	Gold	Silver	Bronze
Boys' volleyball	Cuba; Wilfredo León; Alejandro González; Calos Araujo; Juan Andres León; Alexis Lamadrid (c); Yonder Garcia (L); Yulian Duran; Daniel Albo; Nelson Loyola; Yassel Perdomo Head coach: Rodolfo Sánchez	Argentina; Mauro Llanos; Luciano Verasio; Leonardo Plaza; Frederico Martina; Gonzalo Lapera; Ramiro Nunez; Esteban Martínez; Gonzalo Quiroga (c); Tomás Ruiz (L); Ezequiel Palacios; Nicolas Mendez; Damian Villalba Head coach: Juan Manuel	Russia; Vladimir Manerov; Bogdan Glivenko; Ivan Komarov; Dmitriy Solodilin (L); Valentin Golubev; Aleksandr Shchurin; Filipp Mokievskiy; Aleksey Tertyshnikov; Konstantin Osipov (c); Ilya Nikitin; Vadim Zolotukhin; Maxim Kulikov Head coach: Andrey Kukushkin
Girls' volleyball	Belgium; Laurine Klinkenberg; Laura Heyrman; Delfien Brugman; Elien Ruysschaert; Ilka Van de Vyver (c); Lore Van den Vonder; Sophie Van Nimmen (L); Mira Juwet; Karolien Vleugels; Tara Lauwers; Lotte Penders; Valerie El Houssine Head coach: Julien Van de Vyver	United States; Samantha Cash (c); Crystal Graff; Micha Hancock; Natalie Hayes; Christina Higgins; Madison Kamp; Elizabeth McMahon; Katie Mitchell; Tiffany Morales (L); Olivia Okoro; Taylor Simpson; Laura Teknipp Head coach: Rod Wilde	Peru; Cary Vasquez; Brenda Daniela Uribe; Grecia Herrada; María Fátima Acosta (L); Vivian Baella; Alexandra Muñoz; Lisset Sosa; Katerinne Olemar; Raffaella Camet; Diana Gonzales; Clarivett Yllescas (c); Sandra Chumacero Head coach: Natalia Málaga

== Participating teams ==
=== Boys ===
Group A

- Democratic Republic of the Congo
- Russia
- Serbia

Group B

- Argentina
- Cuba
- Iran

=== Girls ===
Group A

- Japan
- Peru
- Singapore

Group B

- Belgium
- Egypt
- United States
