= Malofeev =

Malofeyev or Malofeev (Russian: Малофеев) is a Russian surname originating from the masculine given name Malachi; its feminine coounterpart is Malofeyeva or Malofeeva. Notable people with the surname include:

- Alexander Malofeev (born 2001), Russian pianist
- Eduard Malofeyev (born 1942), Soviet–Belarusian soccer coach and former player
- Konstantin Malofeev (born 1974), Russian businessman
- Liudmila Malofeeva (born 1988), Russian volleyball player
- Mikhail Malofeyev (1956–2000), Russian general
