= Herrada =

Herrada is a Spanish surname. Notable people with the surname include:

- Grecia Herrada (born 1993), Peruvian volleyball player
- Jesús Herrada (born 1990), Spanish cyclist
- José Herrada (born 1985), Spanish cyclist
