= Makuto =

Makuto is a surname. Notable people with the surname include:

- Asha Makuto (born 1986), Kenyan volleyball player
- Everlyne Makuto (born 1990), Kenyan volleyball player
- Violet Makuto (born 1992), Kenyan volleyball player
