= Vivian Baella =

Peruvian volleyball player

Personal information
- Full name: Vivian Isabel Baella Guevara
- Nickname: SuperVivian
- Born: August 3, 1992 (age 34) Rioja, San Martín
- Home town: Lima, Peru
- Height: 173 cm (5 ft 8 in)
- Weight: 63 kg (139 lb)
- Spike: 291 cm (115 in)
- Block: 280 cm (110 in)
Beach volleyball information
- Years: Teammate
- 2010–2011 2012: Grecia Herrada; Sandra Chumacero

Indoor volleyball information
- Position: Wing Spiker
- Current club: Alianza Lima
- Number: 5

National team
- Years: Team
- 2008–2011: Peru
Honours
Women's volleyball
Representing Peru
Youth Olympic Games
Bronze medal – third place	2010 Singapore	Team
Junior Pan American Cup
Gold medal – first place	2011 Callao	Team
Junior South American Championship
Silver medal – second place	2010 Antioquia	Team
Bronze medal – third place	2008 Lima	Team
Youth South American Championship
Silver medal – second place	2008 Lima	Team
- Updated on August 2012

Vivian Isabel Baella Guevara (born August 3, 1992 in Rioja, Peru) is a Peruvian indoor volleyball and beach volleyball player who plays for the Peru national team. Vivian gained fame after her performance in the 2008 Youth South American Volleyball Championship.

== Career ==
=== 2008 ===
Vivian made her debut with Peru's Junior Volleyball Team in the Junior South American Volleyball Championship, she was captain of the team. She helped her country win the Bronze Medal in the tournament and Vivian was named Best Spiker.

=== 2010 ===
She represented Peru's Junior Volleyball Team again at the Junior South American Volleyball Championship winning the Silver Medal. Her team also won the Bronze Medal at the First Youth Olympic Games.

=== 2011 ===
Vivian played with her National Junior Team at the first Junior Pan-American Cup, held in her country, Peru. Her team won the Gold Medal.

She also participated with her team in the 2011 Women's Junior World Championship which has held in Peru, her team finished in 6th place.

Vivian alongside teammate Grecia Herrada started playing Beach Volleyball for the 2011 season finishind third in Peru's national tournament and qualifying for the South American Beach Volleyball Championship.

=== 2012 ===
Vivian decided to change from indoor volleyball to beach volleyball completely, with the beginning of the first Beach Volleyball program in Peru, led by Seoul Olympics silver medallist Rosa García. Vivian partnered with fellow Youth Olympics bronze medallist Sandra Chumacero for the 2012 FIVB Junior Beach Volleyball World Championship in Halifax, Canada. The Peruvian duo did not pass the first round of competition.

=== 2013 ===
Vivian is convened for Peru women's national volleyball team and the Peru women's national volleyball team U23. Currently plays for Volleyball Club Alianza Lima in the Peruvian League volleyball.

== Super Vivian ==
After being captain of Peru's Junior Team in 2008 and helping her country get back into the podium, Mauri created an Animated Series called Super Vivian that follows Vivian as the best player in the team. Vivian has stated that she does not like being called Super Vivian as she sees that the comic is not at all based on reality since the animated series shows her as being the only good player in the team and "standing up" to her coach Natalia Málaga.

== Clubs ==
- (Peru) Regatas Lima (2008–2011)
- (Peru) Alianza Lima (2012–present)

== Awards ==
=== Individuals ===
- 2008 Youth South American Championship "Best Spiker"

=== National team ===
==== Junior team ====
- 2008 Junior South American Championship – Bronze Medal
- 2010 Junior South American Championship – Silver Medal
- 2010 Youth Olympic Games – Bronze Medal
- 2011 Junior Pan-American Cup – Gold Medal

=== Clubs ===
- 2009 Volleyball National Championship – Runner-up with Regatas Lima
