= Ilka Van de Vyver =

Belgian volleyball player

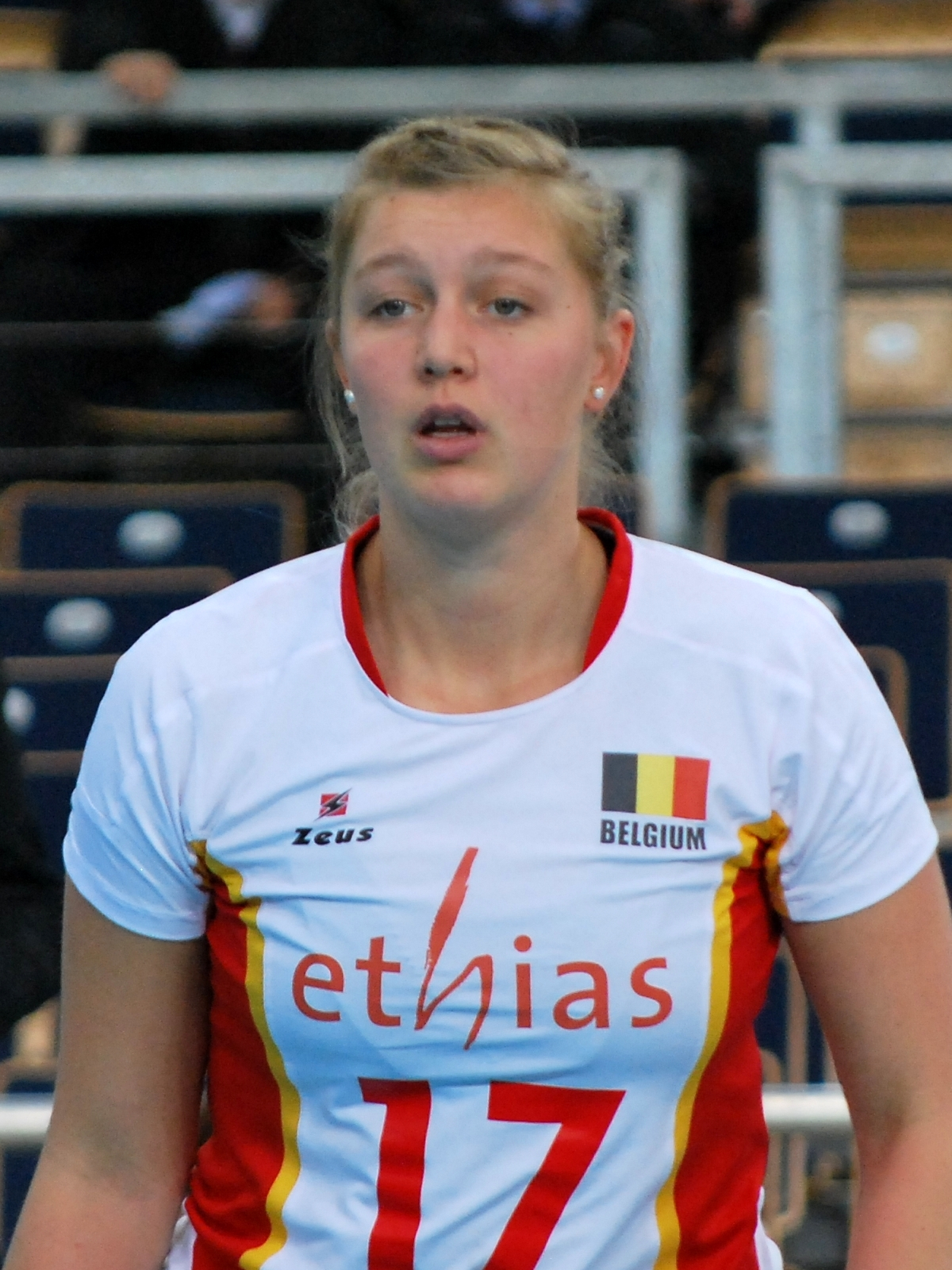

Personal information
- Nationality: Belgium
- Born: 26 January 1993 (age 33)
- Height: 1.79 m (5 ft 10 in)
- Weight: 75 kg (165 lb)
- Spike: 296 cm (117 in)
- Block: 273 cm (107 in)

Volleyball information
- Position: Setter
- Current club: AEK
- Number: 8

Career
Years	Teams
2009–2012; 2012–2015; 2015–2016; 2016–2017; 2017–2019; 2019–2021; 2021–2022; 2022–2023; 2022–2023; 2023–2024; 2024–2026; 2026–	Asterix Kieldrecht; RC Cannes; Azzurra S. Casciano; Calcit Volleyball; Rote Raben Vilsbiburg; CSM Târgoviște; Allianz MTV Stuttgart; Sigorta Shop; CSM Târgoviște; CSO Voluntari; PAOK; AEK

National team
2012–	Belgium
Honours
Women's volleyball
Representing Belgium
European Championships
Bronze medal – third place	2013 Germany	Team
Youth Olympic Games
Gold medal – first place	2010 Singapore	Team

Ilka Van de Vyver (born 26 January 1993) is a Belgian volleyball player. She is a member of the Belgium women's national volleyball team and plays for AEK since 2026.

She was part of the Belgian national team at the 2014 FIVB Volleyball Women's World Championship in Italy, and the 2017 FIVB Volleyball World Grand Prix.

== Clubs ==
- (Belgium) Asterix Kieldrecht (2009–2012)
- (France) RC Cannes (2012–2015)
- (Italy) Azzurra S. Casciano (2015–2016)
- (Slovenia) Calcit Volleyball (2016–2017)
- (Germany) Rote Raben Vilsbiburg (2017–present)
