= 2016 Women's Junior South American Volleyball Championship =

Tournament details
- Host country: Brazil
- Dates: 26–30 October
- Teams: 6
- Venue: 1 (in Uberaba host cities)

Final positions
- Champions: Brazil (19th title)

Tournament awards
- MVP: Lorrayna da Silva (BRA)

The 2016 Women's Junior South American Volleyball Championship was the 23rd edition of the tournament, organised by South America's governing volleyball body, the Confederación Sudamericana de Voleibol (CSV). The champion will qualify for the 2017 Junior World Championship.

== Competing nations ==
The following national teams will participate in the tournament:

Pool A

Argentina
Brazil
Chile
Paraguay
Peru
Uruguay

== Competition format ==
The championship consisted of a single Round-Robin pool between the six teams, the champion was determined from the ranking after the round.

== Competition ==
- All times are Brasília standard time (UTC-3)

Pos	Team	Pld	W	L	Pts	SW	SL	SR	SPW	SPL	SPR
1	Brazil	5	5	0	15	15	1	15.000	398	233	1.708
2	Argentina	5	4	1	12	13	4	3.250	410	301	1.362
3	Peru	5	3	2	9	10	6	1.667	375	290	1.293
4	Uruguay	5	2	3	6	6	10	0.600	280	370	0.757
5	Chile	5	1	4	3	3	13	0.231	272	382	0.712
6	Paraguay	5	0	5	0	2	15	0.133	258	417	0.619

Date	Time		Score		Set 1	Set 2	Set 3	Set 4	Set 5	Total
26-Oct	14:30	Argentina	3–0	Chile	25–17	25–8	25–18			75–43
26-Oct	17:00	Peru	3–0	Uruguay	25–18	25–9	25–10			75–37
26-Oct	19:30	Brazil	3–0	Paraguay	25-13	25-7	25-12			75-32
27-Oct	14:30	Peru	3–0	Chile	25-13	25-12	25-15			75-40
27-Oct	17:00	Argentina	3–0	Paraguay	25-8	25-6	25-14			75-28
27-Oct	19:30	Uruguay	0–3	Brazil	11-25	9-25	10-25			30-75
28-Oct	14:30	Paraguay	1–3	Uruguay	25-23	23-25	18-25	19-25		85-98
28-Oct	17:00	Peru	1–3	Argentina	31-29	21-25	20-25	23-25		95-104
28-Oct	19:30	Chile	0–3	Brazil	11-25	18-25	6-25			35-75
29-Oct	14:00	Paraguay	0–3	Peru	9-25	15-25	10-25			34-75
29-Oct	16:00	Uruguay	3–0	Chile	25-17	25-17	28-26			78-60
29-Oct	18:00	Brazil	3–1	Argentina	25-22	25-14	23-25	25-20		98-81
30-Oct	8:00	Chile	3–1	Paraguay	25-20	19-25	25-15	25-19		94-79
30-Oct	10:00	Argentina	3–0	Uruguay	25-13	25-10	25-14			75-37
30-Oct	12:00	Brazil	3–0	Peru	25-19	25-22	25-14			75-55

== Final standing ==
Rank	Team
1st place, gold medalist(s)	Brazil
2nd place, silver medalist(s)	Argentina
3rd place, bronze medalist(s)	Peru
4	Uruguay
5	Chile
6	Paraguay

Qualified for the 2017 Junior World Championship

2016 Women's Junior South American Volleyball Championship

Brazil
19th title

12–woman Roster
Diana Alecrim, Lorena Viezel, Glayce Vasconcelos, Nyema Costa, Amanda Sehn, Beatriz Carvalho, Karina Souza, Jackeline Santos, Lorrayna da Silva, Julia Moura, Tamara de Paula
Head coach

== Awards ==
Players who received individual awards:

- Most valuable player
  - Lorrayna da Silva (BRA)
- Best setter
  - Jackeline Santos (BRA)
- Best Outside Hitters
  - Glayce Vasconcelos (BRA)
  - Leslie Leyva (PER)
- Best Opposite
  - Lorrayna da Silva (BRA)
- Best Middle Blockers
  - Diana Alecrim (BRA)
  - Agostina Beltramino (ARG)
- Best libero
  - Valentina Gonzalez (ARG)
