= Clarivett Yllescas =

Peruvian volleyball player

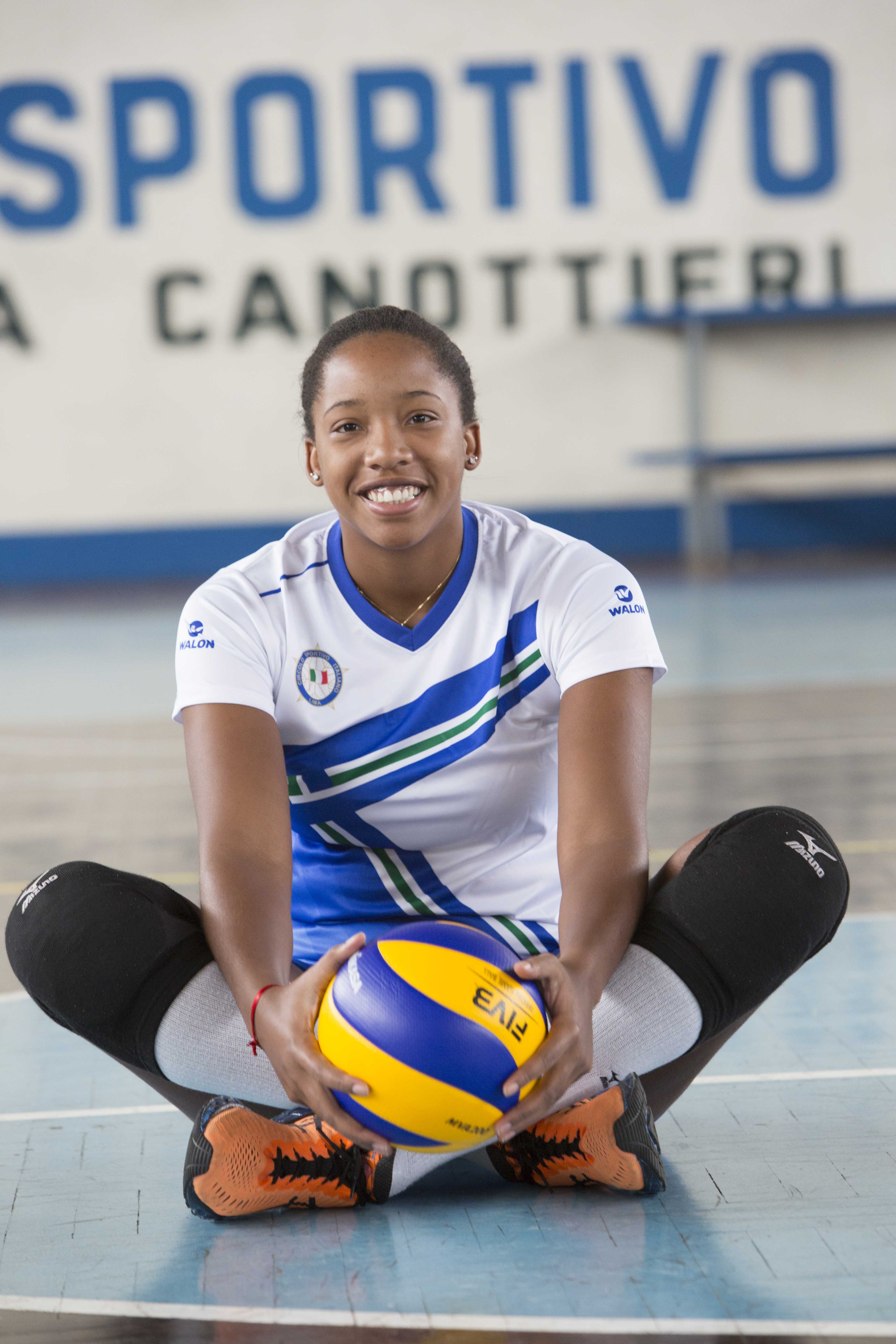

Personal information
- Full name: Clarivett Yamily Yllescas Abad
- Nationality: Peruvian
- Born: 11 August 1993 (age 33); Chincha, Ica Region
- Hometown: Lima, Peru
- Height: 184 cm (6 ft 0 in)
- Weight: 70 kg (154 lb)
- Spike: 305 cm (120 in)
- Block: 295 cm (116 in)

Volleyball information
- Position: Middle Blocker
- Current club: Volley Club de Marcq-en-Baroeul Lille Métropole
- Number: 11

Career
Years	Teams
2010–2012; 2013–2016; 2016–2018; 2018–2019	Divino Maestro; CV Universidad César Vallejo; Circolo Sportivo Italiano; Volley Club de Marcq-en-Baroeul Lille Métropole

National team
2009–present	Peru
Honours
Women's volleyball
Representing Peru
Youth Olympic Games
Bronze medal – third place	2010 Singapore	National team
South American Championship
Bronze medal – third place	2011 Callao	National team
Bronze medal – third place	2013 Ica	National team
Bronze medal – third place	2019 Cajamarca	National team
Bolivarian Games
Gold medal – first place	2013 Trujillo	National team
Junior Pan American Cup
Gold medal – first place	2011 Callao	National team
Junior South American Championship
Silver medal – second place	2010 Antioquia	National team
- Last updated: August 2017

Clarivett Yamily Yllescas Abad (Note: In this Spanish name, the first or paternal surname is Yllescas and the second or maternal family name is Abad.) (born 11 August 1993 in Chincha, Ica Region) is a Peruvian volleyball player who plays for the Peru team.

== Career ==
=== 2010: Rise to fame ===
Clarivett signed with Peruvian volleyball club Divino Maestro for the 2010–11 season.

Later that year she debuted as captain of Peru's U20 National Volleyball Team at the 2010 South America Volleyball Championship U20 winning the Silver Medal. Her team also won the Bronze Medal at the 2010 Youth Olympic Games.

=== 2011–2012: Rebirth of Peruvian Volleyball ===
Clarivett helped her club, Divino Mestro, win the 2010–11 season of the Peruvian volleyball league

Clarivett played with her National Junior Team at the U-20 Pan-American Cup, held in her country, Peru. Her team won the Gold Medal

She also participated with her team in the 2011 Women's Junior World Championship which has held in Peru, her team finished in 6th place.

Right after the Junior World Championship, Clarivett joined Peru's senior team for the 2011 World Grand Prix, she also represented her country at the 2011 South American Championship winning the bronze medal.

=== 2013–present: Hiatus due to injury ===
Late 2012 Clarivett signed to play for Universidad César Vallejo Club for the 2012–13 season of the Peruvian Volleyball League, however, Clarivett suffered from a stress fracture of the left ankle which left her unable to play the season. In January 2013 it was revealed Clarivett would not be able to play for at least six months.

== Clubs ==
- (Peru) Divino Maestro (2010 – 2012)
- (Peru) CV Universidad César Vallejo (2013 – 2016)
- (Peru) Circolo Sportivo Italiano (2016 – 2018)
- (France) Volley Club de Marcq-en-Baroeul Lille Métropole (2018 – 2023)
- (Peru) Alianza Lima (2023 – 2025)

== Awards ==
=== National team ===
==== Senior team ====
- 2013 Bolivarian Games – Gold Medal
- 2013 South American Championship – Bronze Medal
- 2011 South American Championship – Bronze Medal

==== Junior team ====
- 2010 Junior South American Championship – Silver Medal
- 2010 Youth Olympic Games – Bronze Medal
- 2011 Junior Pan-American Cup – Gold Medal

=== Clubs ===
- 2010–11 Liga Nacional Superior de Voleibol – Champion with Divino Maestro
- 2023–24 Liga Nacional Superior de Voleibol – Champion with Alianza Lima
- 2024–25 Liga Nacional Superior de Voleibol – Champion with Alianza Lima
