= Raffaella Camet =

Peruvian volleyball player

Personal information
- Full name: Raffaella Camet Bertello
- Born: September 14, 1992 (age 34) Lima, Peru
- Home town: Lima, Peru
- Height: 1.77 m (5 ft 9 1/2 in)
- Weight: 67 kg (148 lb)
- Spike: 303 cm (119 in)
- Block: 290 cm (114 in)

Volleyball information
- Position: Opposite
- Current club: Sporting Cristal
- Number: 9

National team
- Years: Team
- 2009 -: Peru
Honours
Women's volleyball
Representing Peru
Youth Olympic Games
Bronze medal – third place	2010 Singapore	National team
Bolivarian Games
Gold medal – first place	2013 Trujillo	National team
Junior Pan American Cup
Gold medal – first place	2011 Callao	National team
Junior South American Championship
Silver medal – second place	2010 Antioquia	National team
Bronze medal – third place	2008 Lima	National team
- Updated on August 2013

Raffaella Camet Bertello (born September 14, 1992, in Lima, Peru) is a Peruvian volleyball player who plays for the Peru national team.

== Career ==
=== Volleyball ===
==== 2013-present: Senior team ====
On 2013, Raffaella was promoted to the starting line-up of the senior team for the 2013 Pan-American Cup. Rafaella was Peru's best scorer for the tournament.

=== Model work and sponsorships ===
==== 2009-2011: Minor modeling and national campaigns ====
After the success of her junior team in international competitions, Raffaella signed as the face of Inca Kola.

==== 2012-present: Red Bull and Volley Barrio ====
In 2012, Rafaella signed with Red Bull to be the face of the "Gives you wings" campaign in South America and Europe.

As part of the Red Bull campaigns, in April 2013 Raffaella Camet alongside fellow Peruvian volleyball player Maguilaura Frias participated in the first Red Bull Volley Barrio in South America that was held in the Peruvian cities of Trujillo, Arequipa and Lima, a tournament in which neighborhoods play "street volleyball" with a monetary prize.

Raffaella was the lead in a Webseries about the event called "Volley Barrio, Defend your little country"

== Clubs ==
- (Peru) Sporting Cristal (2009-2013)

== Awards ==
=== National team ===
- 2013 Bolivarian Games - Gold medal
- 2013 South American Championship - Bronze medal

==== Junior team ====
- 2010 Junior South American Championship - Silver Medal
- 2010 Youth Olympic Games - Bronze medal
- 2011 Junior Pan-American Cup - Gold medal

=== Clubs ===
- 2012-13 LNSV - Third Place with Sporting Cristal
