= 2011 Women's Junior Pan-American Volleyball Cup =

Tournament details
- Host country: Peru
- Dates: June 14–22, 2011
- Teams: 7
- Venue: 1 (in 1 host city)

Final positions
- Champions: Peru (1st title)

Tournament awards
- MVP: Daniela Uribe (PER)

The 2011 Women's Junior Pan-American Volleyball Cup was the first edition of the annual women's volleyball tournament, played by seven countries from June 14–22, 2011 in Callao, Peru.

== Competing nations ==
Group A	Group B
El Salvador; Mexico; Peru; Venezuela	Dominican Republic; Costa Rica; Cuba; Argentina (withdrew)

== Preliminary round ==
=== Group A ===
Pos	Team	Pld	W	L	Pts	SPW	SPL	SPR	SW	SL	SR	Qualification
1	Peru	3	3	0	9	225	143	1.573	9	0	MAX	Semifinals
2	Mexico	3	2	1	6	205	171	1.199	6	3	2.000	Quarterfinals
3	Venezuela	3	1	2	3	201	194	1.036	3	6	0.500	Quarterfinals
4	El Salvador	3	0	3	0	102	225	0.453	0	9	0.000	

Date	Time		Score		Set 1	Set 2	Set 3	Set 4	Set 5	Total	Report
16 June	14:00	Mexico	3–0	Venezuela	25–17	26–24	25–23			76–64	P2
16 June	20:00	Peru	3–0	El Salvador	25–8	25–7	25–12			75–27	P2
17 June	14:00	Mexico	3–0	El Salvador	25–13	25–8	25–11			75–32	P2
17 June	20:00	Peru	3–0	Venezuela	25–23	25–21	25–18			75–62	P2
18 June	13:00	Venezuela	3–0	El Salvador	25–11	25–19	25–13			75–43	P2
18 June	19:00	Mexico	0–3	Peru	15–25	19–25	20–25			54–75	54–75

=== Group B ===
Pos	Team	Pld	W	L	Pts	SPW	SPL	SPR	SW	SL	SR	Qualification
1	Dominican Republic	2	2	0	6	150	108	1.389	6	0	MAX	Semifinals
2	Cuba	2	1	1	3	142	126	1.127	3	3	1.000	Quarterfinals
3	Costa Rica	2	0	2	0	92	150	0.613	0	6	0.000	Quarterfinals

Date	Time		Score		Set 1	Set 2	Set 3	Set 4	Set 5	Total	Report
16 June	16:00	Dominican Republic	3–0	Cuba	25–22	25–23	25–22			75–67	P2
17 June	16:00	Dominican Republic	3–0	Costa Rica	25–15	25–10	25–16			75–41	P2
18 June	15:00	Cuba	3–0	Costa Rica	25–17	25–17	25–17			75–51	75–51

== Final round ==
=== Championship bracket ===
Quarterfinals
A3	Venezuela	2
B2	Cuba	3
A2	Mexico	3
B3	Costa Rica	0

Semifinals
A1	Peru	3
B2	Cuba	1
B1	Dominican Republic	3
A2	Mexico	0

Finals
A1	Peru	3
B1	Dominican Republic	1
Third place
A2	Mexico	1
B2	Cuba	3

=== Quarterfinals ===
Date	Time		Score		Set 1	Set 2	Set 3	Set 4	Set 5	Total	Report
19 June	16:00	Venezuela	2–3	Cuba	25–18	22–25	22–25	25–17	9–15	103–100	P2
19 June	18:00	Mexico	3–0	Costa Rica	25–19	25–15	25–18			75–52	75–52

=== Semifinals ===
Date	Time		Score		Set 1	Set 2	Set 3	Set 4	Set 5	Total	Report
20 June	16:00	Dominican Republic	3–0	Mexico	25–11	25–17	25–16			75–44	P2
20 June	20:00	Peru	3–1	Cuba	21–25	25–8	25–22	25–15		96–70	96–70

=== Fifth place match ===
Date	Time		Score		Set 1	Set 2	Set 3	Set 4	Set 5	Total	Report
20 June	18:00	Venezuela	3–0	Costa Rica	25–16	25–19	25–15			75–50	75–50

=== Bronze medal match ===
Date	Time		Score		Set 1	Set 2	Set 3	Set 4	Set 5	Total	Report
21 June	16:00	Mexico	1–3	Cuba	20–25	18–25	25–17	23–25		86–92	86–92

=== Final ===
Date	Time		Score		Set 1	Set 2	Set 3	Set 4	Set 5	Total	Report
21 June	20:00	Dominican Republic	1–3	Peru	25–18	27–29	20–25	17–25		89–97	89–97

== Final standing ==
Rank	Team
1st place, gold medalist(s)	Peru
2nd place, silver medalist(s)	Dominican Republic
3rd place, bronze medalist(s)	Cuba
4	Mexico
5	Venezuela
6	Costa Rica
7	El Salvador

2011 Women's Junior Pan-American Cup champions

Peru
1st title

Team Roster:

Daniela Uribe, Grecia Herrada, Vivian Baella, Alexandra Muñoz, Lisset Sosa, Mabel Olemar, Rafaella Camet, Ginna López, Clarivett Yllescas, Danae Carranza, Diana Gonzales,

María de Fátima Acosta (L)
Head Coach: Natalia Málaga

== Individual awards ==
- Most valuable player
  - Daniela Uribe (PER)
- Best scorer
  - Samantha Bricio (MEX)
- Best spiker
  - Daniela Uribe (PER)
- Best blocker
  - Candida Arias (DOM)
- Best server
  - Alexandra Muñoz (PER)
- Best digger
  - Genesis Duran (VEN)
- Best setter
  - Alexandra Muñoz (PER)
- Best receiver
  - María de Fátima Acosta (PER)
- Best libero
  - Genesis Duran (VEN)
