= Democratic Republic of the Congo at the 2010 Summer Youth Olympics =

- IOC code: COD
- NOC: Comité Olympique Congolais

in Singapore
- Competitors: 16 in 5 sports
- Flag bearer: Daryl Lokuku Ngambomo

Summer Youth Olympics appearances
- 2010; 2014; 2018

The Democratic Republic of the Congo competed at the 2010 Summer Youth Olympics, the inaugural Youth Olympic Games, held in Singapore from 14 August to 26 August 2010.

== Medalists ==
Medal	Name	Sport	Event	Date
Gold	Daryl Lokuku Ngambomo	Judo	Mixed Team	25 Aug

== Athletics ==
=== Boys ===
Track and road events

Athletes	Event	Qualification		Final	
Athletes	Event	Result	Rank	Result	Rank
Yorghena Embole Mokulu	Boys' 400m	DNF qD		51.24	24

== Fencing ==
Group Stage

Athlete	Event	Match 1	Match 2	Match 3	Match 4	Match 5	Match 6	Seed
Gracia Makwanya Nyabileke	Girls’ Sabre	Merza (USA); L 0-5	Wan (CHN); L 1-5	Musch (GER); L 4-5	Hilwiyah (IRQ); L 4-5	Wator (POL); L 0-5	Komaschuk (UKR); L 2-5	13

Knock-Out Stage

Athlete	Event	Round of 16	Quarterfinals	Semifinals	Final	Rank
Gracia Makwanya Nyabileke	Girls’ Sabre	Musch (GER); L 2-15	did not advance			13

== Judo ==
Individual

Athlete	Event	Round 1	Round 2	Round 3	Semifinals	Final	Rank
Athlete	Event	Opposition Result	Opposition Result	Opposition Result	Opposition Result	Opposition Result	Rank
Daryl Lokuku Ngambomo	Boys' -81 kg	Pretivatii (MDA); W 001-000	Lee (KOR); L 001-010	Repechage; Dedeic (MNE); L 000-100	did not advance		9

Team

Team	Event	Round 1	Round 2	Semifinals	Final	Rank
Team	Event	Opposition Result	Opposition Result	Opposition Result	Opposition Result	Rank
Essen; Lesly Cano (PER); Pedro Rivadulla (ESP); Andrea Krisandova (SVK); Kairat Agibayev (KAZ); Daryl Lokuku Ngambomo (COD); Miku Tashiro (JPN); Alex Maxell Garcia Mendoza (CUB)	Mixed Team	Munich; W 4-3	Chiba; W 5-2	Cairo; W 5-2	Belgrade; W 6-1	Gold medal

== Taekwondo ==
Athlete	Event	Preliminary	Quarterfinal	Semifinal	Final	Rank
Sephora Baelenge	Girls' -63kg	BYE	Samantha Silvestri (FRA); L 1-15	did not advance		5

== Volleyball ==
Squad List	Event	Group Stage		5th Place Match	Rank
Squad List	Event	Group A	Rank	5th Place Match	Rank
Guelord Kadima; Tshitshi Tshidende; Darby Misiyo Ango; Faustin Shesha Masako; Maxime Kazadi (C); Patrick Tshibangu; N. Magloir Mayaula; Ousman Badiya; Francis Mujani; Patrick Misano; Salva Mbuyi Banza; Djo Inginda	Boys' Volleyball	Serbia; L 1-3 (15-25, 18-25, 25-22, 21-25)	3	Iran; L 0-3 (9-25, 15-25, 17-25)	6
Guelord Kadima; Tshitshi Tshidende; Darby Misiyo Ango; Faustin Shesha Masako; Maxime Kazadi (C); Patrick Tshibangu; N. Magloir Mayaula; Ousman Badiya; Francis Mujani; Patrick Misano; Salva Mbuyi Banza; Djo Inginda	Boys' Volleyball	Russia; L 0-3 (22-25, 15-25, 13-25)	3	Iran; L 0-3 (9-25, 15-25, 17-25)	6
