= Alexandra Muñoz =

Peruvian volleyball player

Personal information
- Full name: Alexandra Miryec Muñoz Lurita
- Nickname: Miyi
- Born: August 16, 1992 (age 34); Lima, Peru
- Hometown: Lima
- Height: 1.77 m (5 ft 10 in)
- Weight: 63 kg (139 lb)
- Spike: 287 cm (113 in)
- Block: 281 cm (111 in)

Volleyball information
- Position: Setter
- Current club: Divino Maestro
- Number: 6

National team
| 2009 - | Peru |
Honours
Women's volleyball
Representing Peru
Youth Olympic Games
| Bronze medal – third place | 2010 Singapore | National team |
Bolivarian Games
| Gold medal – first place | 2012 Trujillo | National team |
South American Championship
| Bronze medal – third place | 2011 Callao | National team |
| Bronze medal – third place | 2013 Ica | National team |
Junior Pan American Cup
| Gold medal – first place | 2011 Callao | National team |
Junior South American Championship
| Silver medal – second place | 2010 Antioquia | National team |
- Last updated: November 2013

Alexandra Miryec Muñoz Lurita (born August 16, 1992) is a Peruvian volleyball player who has represented her country at the 2010 Youth Olympics where she helped her team win a Bronze Medal. She is currently the starting setter for the Peru national team.

== Career ==
=== 2009 ===
Alexandra made her debut with the Peru U18 team at the 2009 Youth World Championship, her team finished in 6th place, the best result for any Peruvian team since 1993. Alexandra along with most of her teammates gained fame after the tournament.

=== 2010 ===
Alexandra signed with Peruvian volleyball club Divino Maestro for the 2010-11 season.

Later that year she participated at the 2010 South America Volleyball Championship U20 winning the Silver Medal. Her team also won the Bronze Medal at the 2010 Youth Olympic Games.

=== 2011 ===
Alexandra helped her club, Divino Mestro, win the 2010-11 season of the Peruvian volleyball league

Alexandra played with her National Junior Team at the U-20 Pan-American Cup, held in her country, Peru. Her team won the Gold Medal and Alexandra was named "Best Setter" of the tournament, she also won the "Best Server" award.

She also participated with her team in the 2011 Women's Junior World Championship which has held in Peru, her team finished in 6th place.

Right after the Junior World Championship, Alexandra joined Peru's senior team for the 2011 World Grand Prix.

Alexandra represented her country at the 2011 Pan American Games, as of that tournament, Alexandra is the starting setter for the team.

== Clubs ==
- (Peru) Divino Maestro (2010–2012)
- (Peru) CV Universidad Cesar Vallejo (2013–2014)

== Awards ==
=== Individuals ===
- 2011 Junior Pan-American Cup "Best Setter"
- 2011 Junior Pan-American Cup "Best Server"
- 2012 Copa Latina "Best Setter"
- 2012 Copa Latina "Best Server"
- 2016 Pan-American Cup "Best Setter"

=== National team ===
==== Senior team ====
- 2013 Bolivarian Games – Gold Medal
- 2011 South American Championship – Bronze Medal
- 2013 South American Championship – Bronze Medal

==== Junior team ====
- 2010 Junior South American Championship – Silver Medal
- 2010 Youth Olympic Games – Bronze Medal
- 2011 Junior Pan-American Cup – Gold Medal

=== Clubs ===
- 2010-11 Liga Nacional Superior de Voleibol – Champion with Divino Maestro
