= Francyne Aparecida =

Brazilian volleyball player

Francyne Aparecida Jacintho

Personal information
- Nationality: Brazilian
- Born: July 16, 1992 (age 34)
- Height: 1.9 m (6 ft 3 in)
- Weight: 66 kg (146 lb)
- Spike: 304 cm (120 in)
- Block: 243 cm (96 in)

Volleyball information
- Position: Middle blocker
- Current club: Praia Clube

National team
2016	Brazil
Honours
Women's volleyball
Representing Brazil

Francyne Aparecida Jacintho (born 16 July 1992) is a Brazilian volleyball player who has represented her country in world championships. She is a member of the Brazil women's national volleyball team.

She was part of the Brazil national indoor volleyball team at the 2010 Women's Pan-American Volleyball Cup, and 2016 Montreux Volley Masters.

She participated at the 2018 FIVB Volleyball Women's Club World Championship.

== Clubs ==
- 2016 Rexona-Sesc
- 2018 Praia Clube
