= Esther Mwombe =

Kenyan volleyball player (born 1987)

Personal information
- Nationality: Kenyan
- Born: 10 April 1987 (age 39)
- Height: 1.73 m (5 ft 8 in)
- Weight: 67 kg (148 lb)
- Spike: 290 cm (114 in)
- Block: 275 cm (108 in)

Volleyball information
- Number: 4

Career
Years	Teams
2010	Kenya Prisons

National team
2010	Kenya

Esther Mwombe (born 10 April 1987) is a retired Kenyan female volleyball player.

She was part of the Kenya women's national volleyball team at the 2010 FIVB Volleyball Women's World Championship in Japan. She played with Kenya Prisons.

== Clubs ==
- Kenya Prisons (2010)
