= Alexandra Issayeva =

Kazakhstani volleyball player (born 1982)

Personal information
- Nationality: Kazakhstani
- Born: 14 July 1982 (age 44)
- Height: 1.80 m (5 ft 11 in)
- Weight: 78 kg (172 lb)
- Spike: 295 cm (116 in)
- Block: 285 cm (112 in)

Volleyball information
- Position: spiker
- Number: 18

Career
Years	Teams
2010	(Azerbaijan) Rabita Baku

National team
2010	Kazakhstan

Alexandra Issayeva (born 14 July 1982) is a retired Kazakhstani volleyball player. She was part of the Kazakhstan women's national volleyball team.

She participated in the 2010 FIVB Volleyball Women's World Championship. She played with Rabita Baku.

== Clubs ==
- (Azerbaijan) Rabita Baku (2010)
