= Bilha Chepchirchir =

Kenyan volleyball player (born 1990)

Personal information
- Nationality: Kenyan
- Born: 13 October 1990 (age 36)
- Height: 1.68 m (5 ft 6 in)
- Weight: 57 kg (126 lb)
- Spike: 297 cm (117 in)
- Block: 288 cm (113 in)

Volleyball information
- Number: 19

Career
| Years | Teams |
|---|---|
| 2010 | (Kenya) Blue Triangle |

National team
| 2010 | Kenya |

Bilha Chepchirchir (born 13 October 1990) is a Kenyan female volleyball player. She was part of the Kenya women's national volleyball team.

She participated in the 2010 FIVB Volleyball Women's World Championship. She played with Blue Triangle.

== Clubs ==
- (Kenya) Blue Triangle (2010)
