= Yudit Pumariega =

Cuban volleyball player

Yudit Pumariega de León
Personal information
- Full name: Yudit Pumariega de León
- Nationality: Cuban
- Born: 19 February 1991
- Died: 1 August 2013 (aged 22)
- Height: 1.86 m (6 ft 1 in)
- Weight: 65 kg (143 lb)
- Spike: 310 cm (122 in)
- Block: 300 cm (118 in)

Volleyball information
- Position: Outside hitter
- Number: 16 (national team)

Career
- Years: Team
- 2010: Cienfuegos

National team
- Years: Team
- 2010: Cuba

Yudit Pumariega de León (19 February 1991 - 1 August 2013), also known as Yudit Pumariega, was a Cuban volleyball player. She was part of the Cuban women's national volleyball team.

Pumariega participated in the 2010 FIVB World Championship. She played with the club team Cienfuegos.

She died in a car accident on 1 August 2013.

== Clubs ==
- (Cuba) Cienfuegos (2010)
