= Sarah Akroun =

Algerian volleyball player (born 1994)

Sarah Akroun (born February 5, 1994, in Béjaïa) is an Algerian volleyball player. She plays as a setter.

She played for the Association sportive de la wilaya de Béjaïa in 2016 and for SC Nord Parisien in 2017–19.

She was African Player of the Year in 2019; in 2023, she was listed as the 33rd best Algerian volleyball player of all time.

== Club information ==
Current club : (Algeria) ASW Béjaïa
