= Liudmila Malofeeva =

Russian volleyball player (born 1988)

Personal information
- Nationality: Russian
- Born: 18 May 1988 (age 38)
- Height: 1.90 m (6 ft 3 in)
- Weight: 80 kg (176 lb)
- Spike: 309 cm (122 in)
- Block: 303 cm (119 in)

Volleyball information
- Position: opposite
- Number: 18

Career
Years	Teams
2010	(Russia) Omichka Omsk

National team
2010	Russia

Liudmila Malofeeva (born 18 May 1988) is a retired Russian female volleyball player. She was part of the Russia women's national volleyball team.

She participated in the 2010 FIVB Volleyball Women's World Championship. She played with Omichka Omsk.

== Clubs ==
- (Russia) Omichka Omsk (2010)
