= Brenda Uribe =

Peruvian volleyball player

Brenda Daniela Uribe

Personal information
- Full name: Brenda Daniela Uribe Soriano
- Born: 11 December 1993 (age 32); Lima, Peru
- Hometown: Lima
- Height: 1.83 m (6 ft 0 in)
- Weight: 63 kg (139 lb)
- Spike: 297 cm (117 in)
- Block: 282 cm (111 in)

Volleyball information
- Position: Middle Blocker/Opposite
- Current club: Alianza Lima

National team
2009 -	Peru
Honours
Women's volleyball
Representing Peru
Youth Olympic Games
Bronze medal – third place	2010 Singapore	National team
Junior Pan American Cup
Gold medal – first place	2011 Callao	National team
Junior South American Championship
Silver medal – second place	2010 Antioquia	National team
Bronze medal – third place	2008 Lima	National team
- Last updated: December 2011

Brenda Daniela Uribe Soriano (born 11 December 1993, in Lima, Peru) is a Peruvian volleyball player who plays for the Peru national team.

== Career ==
=== 2009 ===
Brenda debuted in Deportivo Alianza Club in Lima, Peru.

=== 2010 ===
She debuted internationally with her U20 National Volleyball Team at the 2010 South America Volleyball Championship U20 winning the Silver Medal. Her team also won the Bronze Medal at the 2010 Youth Olympic Games.

=== 2011 ===
Brenda played with her National Junior Team at the U-20 Pan-American Cup, held in her country, Peru. Her team won the Gold Medal and Brenda was named MVP of the tournament, she also won the "Best Spiker" award.

She also participated with her team in the 2011 Women's Junior World Championship which has held in Peru, her team finished in 6th place.

Right after the Junior World Championship, Brenda joined Peru's senior team for the 2011 World Grand Prix, she made her debut with the senior team in Peru's first match, against Thailand

Brenda signed with Alianza Lima Club after returning from the 2011 World Grand Prix. She captain of the U20 squad and won the Silver Medal with her team at Peru's first Junior National Volleyball Championship.

== Clubs ==
- (Peru) Deportivo Alianza (2009–2011)
- (Peru) Alianza Lima (2011–2012)
- (Peru) CV Universidad San Martin de Porres (2012-2014)
- (Peru) Jaamsa (2015–2016)
- (Peru) Alianza Lima (2016–still)

== Awards ==
=== Individuals ===
- 2010 Junior South American Championship "Best Spiker"
- 2011 Junior Pan-American Cup "Most Valuable Player"
- 2011 Junior Pan-American Cup "Best Spiker"
- 2011-12 Liga Nacional Superior de Voleibol "Best Scorer"

=== National team ===
==== Junior team ====
- 2010 Junior South American Championship – Silver Medal
- 2010 Youth Olympic Games – Bronze Medal
- 2011 Junior Pan-American Cup – Gold Medal

=== Clubs ===
- 2011 Junior Volleyball National Championship – Runner-up with Alianza Lima
