= Toa Payoh Sports Hall =

Sports facility in Singapore

Coordinates: 1.330366°N 103.851662°E

The Toa Payoh Sports Hall is located in the heart of a residential community in the central region of Singapore and is part of the Toa Payoh Sports & Recreation Centre.

The Sports Hall sits in Toa Payoh New Town, one of the earliest public housing estates in Singapore.

The Toa Payoh Sports Hall was upgraded and converted to host the inaugural Youth Olympic Games’ weightlifting and volleyball competitions for the first time.

With a seating capacity of 2,000 spectators, the Toa Payoh Sports Hall has hosted a wide range of sports events.

== Events ==
It was the venue for the table tennis competition during the 1993 Southeast Asian Games. Other major table tennis events hosted here include the Commonwealth Champions (2000), Women’s World Cup (2002), the Volkswagen Pro-Tour (2004, 2006), and the South-east Asian Championships (2006).

In 2007, the venue also hosted the Five Nations Netball Tournament involving Singapore, Canada, Sri Lanka, Trinidad and Tobago and Northern Ireland.

In 2010, the venue was also a new home for Singapore Lights for playing in the ANZ Championship.
