= Asha Makuto =

Kenyan volleyball player (born 1986)

Personal information
- Nationality: Kenyan
- Born: 2 May 1986 (age 40)
- Height: 1.75 m (5 ft 9 in)
- Weight: 68 kg (150 lb)
- Spike: 285 cm (112 in)
- Block: 255 cm (100 in)

Volleyball information
- Number: 3

Career
| Years | Teams |
|---|---|
| 2010 | Kenya Pipeline Company |

National team
| 2010 | Kenya |

Asha Makuto (born 2 May 1986) is a retired Kenyan female volleyball player. She was part of the Kenya women's national volleyball team.

She participated at the 2010 FIVB Volleyball Women's World Championship in Japan. She played with Kenya Pipeline Company.

== Clubs ==
- Kenya Pipeline Company (2010)
