= 2010 Women's Junior South American Volleyball Championship =

Tournament details
- Host country: Colombia
- Dates: October 11–15
- Teams: 7
- Venues: 2 (in Antioquia host cities)

Final positions
- Champions: Brazil (16th title)

Tournament awards
- MVP: Gabriella Souza (BRA)

The 2010 Women's Junior South American Volleyball Championship was the 20th edition of the tournament, organised by South America's governing volleyball body, the Confederación Sudamericana de Voleibol (CSV). It was held in Envigado and Itagüí, Antioquia, Colombia. The winning national team qualified to the 2011 Junior World Championship alongside Peru who had already secured a berth as Host.

== Competing nations ==
The following national teams qualified, they were seeded according to how they finished in the previous edition of the tournament:

Pool A	Pool B
Colombia (Host & 5th); Venezuela (2nd); Chile (7th); Uruguay (8th)	Brazil (1st); Peru (3rd); Argentina (4th); Ecuador (withdrew)

== First round ==
=== Pool A ===
Pos	Team	Pld	W	L	Pts	SW	SL	SR	SPW	SPL	SPR	Qualification
1	Colombia	3	3	0	6	9	1	9.000	241	187	1.289	Semifinals
2	Venezuela	3	2	1	5	7	3	2.333	227	202	1.124	Semifinals
3	Chile	3	1	2	4	3	6	0.500	141	186	0.758	
4	Uruguay	3	0	3	3	0	9	0.000	126	175	0.720	

Date		Score		Set 1	Set 2	Set 3	Set 4	Set 5	Total
11 Oct	Venezuela	3–0	Chile	25–15	25–21	25–18			75–54
11 Oct	Colombia	3–0	Uruguay	25–18	25–13	25–22			75–53
12 Oct	Venezuela	3–0	Uruguay	25–19	25–18	25–20			75–57
12 Oct	Colombia	3–0	Chile	25–22	25–17	25–18			75–57
13 Oct	Chile	3–0	Uruguay	25–22	25–22	25–20			75–64
13 Oct	Colombia	3–1	Venezuela	16–25	25–19	25–18	25–15		91–77

=== Pool B ===
Pos	Team	Pld	W	L	Pts	SW	SL	SR	SPW	SPL	SPR	Qualification
1	Brazil	2	2	0	4	6	0	MAX	150	120	1.250	Semifinals
2	Peru	2	1	1	3	3	3	1.000	138	138	1.000	Semifinals
3	Argentina	2	0	2	2	0	6	0.000	120	150	0.800	

Date		Score		Set 1	Set 2	Set 3	Set 4	Set 5	Total
11 Oct	Peru	3–0	Argentina	25–21	25–22	25–20			75–63
12 Oct	Brazil	3–0	Argentina	25–22	25–17	25–18			75–57
13 Oct	Brazil	3–0	Peru	25–21	25–19	25–23			75–63

== Final round ==
=== Championship ===
Semifinals
2010-10-14 – Antioquia
Colombia	0
Peru	3
2010-10-14 – Antioquia
Brazil	3
Venezuela	0

Final
2010-10-15 – Antioquia
Peru	0
Brazil	3
Third place
2010-10-15 – Antioquia
Colombia	2
Venezuela	3

=== Semifinals ===
Date		Score		Set 1	Set 2	Set 3	Set 4	Set 5	Total
14 Oct	Brazil	3–0	Venezuela	25–13	25–16	25–20			75–49
14 Oct	Colombia	0–3	Peru	17–25	11–25	15–25			43–75

=== Classification 5–7 ===
Date		Score		Set 1	Set 2	Set 3	Set 4	Set 5	Total
14 Oct	Argentina	3–0	Uruguay	25–18	25–9	25–13			75–40

=== Fifth place ===
Date		Score		Set 1	Set 2	Set 3	Set 4	Set 5	Total
15 Oct	Argentina	3–0	Chile	25–18	25–20	25–11			75–49

=== Third place ===
Date		Score		Set 1	Set 2	Set 3	Set 4	Set 5	Total
15 Oct	Colombia	2–3	Venezuela	17–25	18–25	25–22	25–21	14–16	99–109

=== First place ===
Date		Score		Set 1	Set 2	Set 3	Set 4	Set 5	Total
15 Oct	Brazil	3–0	Peru	25–15	25–13	25–14			75–42

== Final standing ==
Rank	Team
1st place, gold medalist(s)	Brazil
2nd place, silver medalist(s)	Peru
3rd place, bronze medalist(s)	Venezuela
4	Colombia
5	Argentina
6	Chile
7	Uruguay

Qualified for the 2011 Junior World Championship

2010 Women's Junior South American Volleyball Championship

Brazil
16th title

== Individual awards ==
- Most valuable player
  - Gabriella Souza (BRA)
- Best spiker
  - Daniela Uribe (PER)
- Best blocker
  - Francyne Aparecida (BRA)
- Best server
  - Raquel Aguilar (VEN)
- Best digger
  - Génesis Duran (VEN)
- Best setter
  - Priscila Heldes (BRA)
- Best receiver
  - Samara Almeida (BRA)
- Best libero
  - Camila Gómez (COL)
