= Women's Junior South American Volleyball Championship =

International sport competition

- Current season, competition or edition: 2024 Women's Junior South American Volleyball Championship
- Sport: Volleyball
- Founded: 1972
- Continent: South America (CSV)
- Most recent champion: Brazil (22nd title)
- Most titles: Brazil (22 titles)

The Women's Junior South American Volleyball Championship is a sport competition for national women's volleyball teams with players under 21 years, currently held biannually and organized by the Confederación Sudamericana de Voleibol (CSV), the South American volleyball federation.

== Results summary ==
Year	Host	Final			3rd place match			Teams
Year	Host	Champions	Score	Runners-up	3rd place	Score	4th place	Teams
1972; Details	(Brazil); Rio de Janeiro	Brazil	Round-robin	Peru	Argentina	Round-robin	Chile	4
1974; Details	(Argentina); Mendoza	Brazil	Round-robin	Peru	Argentina	Round-robin	Paraguay	7
1976; Details	(Bolivia); La Paz	Brazil	Round-robin	Peru	Argentina	Round-robin	Bolivia	6
1978; Details	(Brazil); Rio de Janeiro	Brazil	Round-robin	Peru	Argentina	Round-robin	Paraguay	6
1980; Details	(Chile); Rancagua	Peru	Round-robin	Brazil	Argentina	Round-robin	Chile	7
1982; Details	(Argentina); Santa Fe	Peru	Round-robin	Brazil	Argentina	Round-robin	Chile	6
1984; Details	(Peru); Iquitos	Brazil	3–0	Peru	Colombia	3–0	Argentina	8
1986; Details	(Brazil); São Paulo	Peru	Round-robin	Brazil	Argentina	Round-robin	Venezuela	7
1988; Details	(Venezuela); Caracas	Peru	Round-robin	Brazil	Argentina	Round-robin	Venezuela	6
1990; Details	(Argentina); San Miguel de Tucumán	Brazil	Round-robin	Peru	Argentina	Round-robin	Venezuela	7
1992; Details	(Bolivia); Oruro	Brazil	Round-robin	Argentina	Peru	Round-robin	Bolivia	5
1994; Details	(Colombia); Medellín	Brazil	3–0	Argentina	Peru	3–0	Colombia	6
1996; Details	(Venezuela); Caracas	Brazil	Round-robin	Argentina	Peru	Round-robin	Colombia	6
1998; Details	(Argentina); Santa Fe	Brazil	Round-robin	Argentina	Peru	Round-robin	Venezuela	8
2000; Details	(Colombia); Medellín	Brazil	3–0	Argentina	Venezuela	3–2	Peru	6
2002; Details	(Bolivia); La Paz	Brazil	Round-robin	Venezuela	Argentina	Round-robin	Peru	6
2004; Details	(Bolivia); La Paz	Brazil	Round-robin	Argentina	Venezuela	Round-robin	Bolivia	5
2006; Details	(Venezuela); Caracas	Brazil	Round-robin	Argentina	Venezuela	Round-robin	Peru	6
2008; Details	(Peru); Lima	Brazil	3–0	Venezuela	Peru	3–2	Argentina	8
2010; Details	(Colombia); Envigado / Itagüí	Brazil	3–0	Peru	Venezuela	3–2	Colombia	7
2012; Details	(Peru); Lima	Brazil	3–1	Peru	Colombia	3–1	Chile	8
2014; Details	(Colombia); Barrancabermeja	Brazil	Round-robin	Peru	Argentina	Round-robin	Chile	5
2016; Details	(Brazil); Uberaba	Brazil	Round-robin	Argentina	Peru	Round-robin	Uruguay	6
2018; Details	(Peru); Lima	Brazil	3–2	Argentina	Peru	3–0	Chile	8
2022; Details	(Peru); Cajamarca	Brazil	3–0	Argentina	Colombia	3–2	Peru	6
2024; Details	(Chile); Osorno	Brazil	3–2	Argentina	Chile	3–0	Colombia	6

== Medals summary ==
Rank	Nation	Gold	Silver	Bronze	Total
1	Brazil	22	4	0	26
2	Peru	4	9	7	20
3	Argentina	0	11	11	22
4	Venezuela	0	2	4	6
5	Colombia	0	0	3	3
6	Chile	0	0	1	1
Totals (6 entries)		26	26	26	78

== Most valuable player by edition ==
- 1972 - 1992 - Unknown
- 1994 - Priscila Pal (BRA)
- 1996 - Unknown
- 1998 - Unknown
- 2000 - Unknown
- 2002 - Unknown
- 2004 - Regiane Bidias (BRA)
- 2006 - Betina Schmidt (BRA)
- 2008 - Ivna Marra (BRA)
- 2010 - Gabriella Souza (BRA)
- 2012 - Diana Arrechea (COL)
- 2014 - Drussyla Costa (BRA)
- 2016 - Lorrayna da Silva (BRA)
- 2018 - Victoria Mayer (ARG)
- 2022 - Helena Wenk (BRA)
- 2024 - Rebeca Borges (BRA)

== See also ==
- Men's Junior South American Volleyball Championship
- Women's U22 South American Volleyball Championship
- Girls' Youth South American Volleyball Championship
- Girls' U16 South American Volleyball Championship
