= Grecia Herrada =

Peruvian volleyball player (born 1993)

Grecia Virgilia Herrada García

Personal information
- Nationality: Peruvian
- Born: 13 March 1993 (age 33)
- Height: 174 cm (5 ft 9 in)
- Weight: 65 kg (143 lb)
- Spike: 295 cm (116 in)
- Block: 285 cm (112 in)

Volleyball information
- Position: outside hitter

Career
Years	Teams
2010	Deportivo Géminis

National team
2010	Peru

Grecia Virgilia Herrada García (born 13 March 1993) was a Peruvian female volleyball player.

She was part of the Peru women's national volleyball team at the 2010 FIVB Volleyball Women's World Championship in Japan. She played with Deportivo Géminis.

== Clubs ==
- (Peru) Deportivo Géminis (2010)
