= 2007 FIVB Volleyball World League squads =

This article show all participating team squads at the 2007 FIVB Volleyball World League, played by 16 countries from 25 May to 15 July 2007. The Final Round was held in Katowice, Poland.

== Argentina ==
The following is the roster in the 2007 FIVB Volleyball World League.

No.	Name	Date of birth	Height	Weight	Spike	Blocky	2007 club
1	Marcos Milinkovic	22 December 1971	205 cm (6 ft 9 in)	99 kg (218 lb)	355 cm (140 in)	338 cm (133 in)	IBB - TUR
2	Gustavo Scholtis	16 December 1982	206 cm (6 ft 9 in)	87 kg (192 lb)	358 cm (141 in)	338 cm (133 in)	La Unión de Formosa Club
3	Diego Stepanenko	25 February 1985	204 cm (6 ft 8 in)	90 kg (200 lb)	349 cm (137 in)	337 cm (133 in)	Palma Volley - ESP
4	Luciano De Cecco	2 June 1988	194 cm (6 ft 4 in)	89 kg (196 lb)	333 cm (131 in)	315 cm (124 in)	Sir Safety Perugia
5	Anibal Gramaglia	29 December 1981	204 cm (6 ft 8 in)	90 kg (200 lb)	349 cm (137 in)	338 cm (133 in)	Belgrano de Córdoba - ARG
6	Santiago Orduna	31 August 1983	185 cm (6 ft 1 in)	75 kg (165 lb)	333 cm (131 in)	324 cm (128 in)	Soria - ESP
7	Ignacio Bernasconi	23 September 1985	195 cm (6 ft 5 in)	75 kg (165 lb)	335 cm (132 in)	323 cm (127 in)	VC Handelsgids - BEL
8	Leandro Martín Concina	4 November 1984	196 cm (6 ft 5 in)	94 kg (207 lb)	340 cm (130 in)	320 cm (130 in)	Gioia del Colle - ITA
9	Lucas Chávez	3 April 1982	199 cm (6 ft 6 in)	95 kg (209 lb)	335 cm (132 in)	318 cm (125 in)	Guaynabo Mets - PTR
10	Rodrigo Aschemacher	6 March 1989	204 cm (6 ft 8 in)	97 kg (214 lb)	340 cm (130 in)	322 cm (127 in)	Unión de Formosa - ARG
11	Franco Giachetta	28 March 1987	201 cm (6 ft 7 in)	94 kg (207 lb)	342 cm (135 in)	323 cm (127 in)	Drean Bolivar - ARG
12	Martin Meana	26 April 1982	188 cm (6 ft 2 in)	83 kg (183 lb)	347 cm (137 in)	320 cm (130 in)	UPCN - ARG
13	Pablo Bengolea	8 May 1986	197 cm (6 ft 6 in)	93 kg (205 lb)	345 cm (136 in)	320 cm (130 in)	Olsztyn
14	Lucas Ocampo	20 March 1986	196 cm (6 ft 5 in)	100 kg (220 lb)	335 cm (132 in)	318 cm (125 in)	Lomas Volley
15	Rodrigo Quiroga	23 March 1987	190 cm (6 ft 3 in)	86 kg (190 lb)	345 cm (136 in)	321 cm (126 in)	Vôlei Canoas
16	Martin Hernández	23 March 1985	202 cm (6 ft 8 in)	80 kg (180 lb)	351 cm (138 in)	330 cm (130 in)	Gigantes del Sur - ARG
17	José Luis González	27 December 1984	206 cm (6 ft 9 in)	97 kg (214 lb)	350 cm (140 in)	333 cm (131 in)	BBTS Bielsko-Biala
18	Gastón Giani	26 April 1979	194 cm (6 ft 4 in)	86 kg (190 lb)	345 cm (136 in)	330 cm (130 in)	Tigre Volley Club - ARG
19	Facundo Santucci	6 March 1987	186 cm (6 ft 1 in)	86 kg (190 lb)	326 cm (128 in)	296 cm (117 in)	Toulouse Club

== Brazil ==
The following is the roster in the 2007 FIVB Volleyball World League.

No.	Name	Date of birth	Height	Weight	Spike	Block	2007 club
1	Bruno Rezende	2 July 1986	190 cm (6 ft 3 in)	76 kg (168 lb)	323 cm (127 in)	302 cm (119 in)	Cimed Florianópolis
2	Marcelo Elgarten	9 November 1974	183 cm (6 ft 0 in)	78 kg (172 lb)	321 cm (126 in)	308 cm (121 in)	Panathinaikos Athens
4	André Heller	17 December 1975	199 cm (6 ft 6 in)	93 kg (205 lb)	339 cm (133 in)	321 cm (126 in)	Trentino Volley
5	Sidnei Santos	9 July 1982	203 cm (6 ft 8 in)	90 kg (200 lb)	348 cm (137 in)	335 cm (132 in)	Cimed Florianópolis
6	Samuel Fuchs	4 March 1984	200 cm (6 ft 7 in)	89 kg (196 lb)	342 cm (135 in)	316 cm (124 in)	Minas Tênis Clube
7	Gilberto Godoy Filho	23 December 1976	192 cm (6 ft 4 in)	85 kg (187 lb)	325 cm (128 in)	312 cm (123 in)	Piemonte Volley
8	Murilo Endres	3 May 1981	190 cm (6 ft 3 in)	76 kg (168 lb)	343 cm (135 in)	319 cm (126 in)	Volley Callipo
9	André Nascimento	4 March 1979	195 cm (6 ft 5 in)	95 kg (209 lb)	340 cm (130 in)	320 cm (130 in)	Trentino Volley
10	Sérgio Dutra Santos	15 October 1975	184 cm (6 ft 0 in)	78 kg (172 lb)	325 cm (128 in)	310 cm (120 in)	Volley Piacenza
11	Anderson Rodrigues	21 May 1974	190 cm (6 ft 3 in)	95 kg (209 lb)	330 cm (130 in)	321 cm (126 in)	Piemonte Volley
12	Nalbert Bitencourt	9 March 1974	195 cm (6 ft 5 in)	82 kg (181 lb)	329 cm (130 in)	309 cm (122 in)	Minas Tênis Clube
13	Gustavo Endres	23 August 1975	203 cm (6 ft 8 in)	98 kg (216 lb)	337 cm (133 in)	325 cm (128 in)	Volley Treviso
14	Rodrigo Santana	17 April 1979	205 cm (6 ft 9 in)	85 kg (187 lb)	350 cm (140 in)	328 cm (129 in)	Lube Volley
16	Wesley Ribeiro	24 April 1979	190 cm (6 ft 3 in)	82 kg (181 lb)	335 cm (132 in)	319 cm (126 in)	E.C. Pinheiros
17	Ricardo Garcia	19 November 1975	191 cm (6 ft 3 in)	89 kg (196 lb)	337 cm (133 in)	320 cm (130 in)	Modena Volley
18	Dante Amaral	30 September 1980	201 cm (6 ft 7 in)	86 kg (190 lb)	345 cm (136 in)	327 cm (129 in)	Panathinaikos Athens

== Bulgaria ==
The following is the roster in the 2007 FIVB Volleyball World League.

No.	Name	Date of birth	Height	Weight	Spike	Block	2007 club
1	Georgi Bratoev	21 October 1987	203 cm (6 ft 8 in)	96 kg (212 lb)	340 cm (130 in)	325 cm (128 in)	Lokomotyv Kharkiv
3	Andrey Zhekov	12 March 1980	190 cm (6 ft 3 in)	82 kg (181 lb)	340 cm (130 in)	326 cm (128 in)	Tomis
4	Boyan Yordanov	12 March 1983	197 cm (6 ft 6 in)	86 kg (190 lb)	358 cm (141 in)	335 cm (132 in)	Pallavolo Genova
5	Krasimir Gaydarski	23 February 1983	204 cm (6 ft 8 in)	96 kg (212 lb)	350 cm (140 in)	330 cm (130 in)	SCC Berlin
6	Matey Kaziyski	23 September 1984	203 cm (6 ft 8 in)	93 kg (205 lb)	370 cm (150 in)	335 cm (132 in)	Al-Rayyan Sports Club
7	Nikolay Nikolov	29 July 1986	206 cm (6 ft 9 in)	97 kg (214 lb)	350 cm (140 in)	332 cm (131 in)	Shahrdari Urmia
8	Konstantin Mitev	27 October 1984	196 cm (6 ft 5 in)	84 kg (185 lb)	350 cm (140 in)	325 cm (128 in)	Pirin
11	Vladimir Nikolov	3 October 1977	200 cm (6 ft 7 in)	95 kg (209 lb)	345 cm (136 in)	325 cm (128 in)	ASU Lyon
12	Teodor Bogdanov	29 January 1986	207 cm (6 ft 9 in)	90 kg (200 lb)	360 cm (140 in)	340 cm (130 in)	Levski Siconco
13	Teodor Salparov	16 August 1982	187 cm (6 ft 2 in)	77 kg (170 lb)	320 cm (130 in)	305 cm (120 in)	Zenit
15	Todor Aleksiev	21 April 1983	204 cm (6 ft 8 in)	105 kg (231 lb)	355 cm (140 in)	340 cm (130 in)	Gazprom - Ugra Surgut
17	Plamen Konstantinov	14 June 1973	202 cm (6 ft 8 in)	93 kg (205 lb)	350 cm (140 in)	330 cm (130 in)	Iraklis THESSALONIKI

== Canada ==
The following is the roster in the 2007 FIVB Volleyball World League.

No.	Name	Date of birth	Height	Weight	Spike	Block	2007 club
1	Louis-Pierre Mainville	3 April 1986	200 cm (6 ft 7 in)	100 kg (220 lb)	340 cm (130 in)	324 cm (128 in)	Team Canada
2	Christian Bernier	20 November 1981	192 cm (6 ft 4 in)	91 kg (201 lb)	341 cm (134 in)	318 cm (125 in)	VCA Hypo Niederoesterreich
3	Daniel Lewis	3 April 1976	189 cm (6 ft 2 in)	86 kg (190 lb)	340 cm (130 in)	325 cm (128 in)	BBTS Bielsko-Bia?a
4	Pascal Cardinal	24 May 1979	199 cm (6 ft 6 in)	93 kg (205 lb)	354 cm (139 in)	321 cm (126 in)	Hypo Tirol
5	Michael Munday	14 October 1980	196 cm (6 ft 5 in)	90 kg (200 lb)	345 cm (136 in)	325 cm (128 in)	Dubai
6	Brock Davidiuk	24 April 1983	194 cm (6 ft 4 in)	88 kg (194 lb)	333 cm (131 in)	310 cm (120 in)	Team Canada
7	Joshua Howatson	7 October 1984	199 cm (6 ft 6 in)	95 kg (209 lb)	346 cm (136 in)	325 cm (128 in)	Amriswil
8	Scott Koskie	14 December 1971	190 cm (6 ft 3 in)	85 kg (187 lb)	330 cm (130 in)	312 cm (123 in)	Montpellier VC
9	Paul Duerden	22 October 1974	196 cm (6 ft 5 in)	98 kg (216 lb)	358 cm (141 in)	320 cm (130 in)	Arkas Sport Club
10	Brett Youngberg	15 September 1979	204 cm (6 ft 8 in)	97 kg (214 lb)	357 cm (141 in)	333 cm (131 in)	Stade Poitvin
11	Steve Brinkman	12 January 1978	203 cm (6 ft 8 in)	96 kg (212 lb)	344 cm (135 in)	335 cm (132 in)	Panachaiki Gymnastiki Enosi
12	Chris Wolfenden	22 June 1977	194 cm (6 ft 4 in)	89 kg (196 lb)	341 cm (134 in)	321 cm (126 in)	Team Canada
13	Mark Dodds	19 June 1983	198 cm (6 ft 6 in)	90 kg (200 lb)	350 cm (140 in)	325 cm (128 in)	SCC
14	Murray Grapentine	24 August 1977	202 cm (6 ft 8 in)	98 kg (216 lb)	359 cm (141 in)	334 cm (131 in)	Cannes VC
15	Frederic Winters	25 September 1982	195 cm (6 ft 5 in)	98 kg (216 lb)	359 cm (141 in)	327 cm (129 in)	Sada Cruisero Volei
16	Nathan Toews	17 June 1985	204 cm (6 ft 8 in)	95 kg (209 lb)	345 cm (136 in)	312 cm (123 in)	University of Manitoba
17	Alexandre Gaumont Casias	26 November 1984	195 cm (6 ft 5 in)	93 kg (205 lb)	358 cm (141 in)	329 cm (130 in)	Rennes Volley 35
18	Nicholas Cundy	14 September 1983	191 cm (6 ft 3 in)	88 kg (194 lb)	350 cm (140 in)	320 cm (130 in)	AS CANNES

== China ==
The following is the roster in the 2007 FIVB Volleyball World League.

No.	Name	Date of birth	Height	Weight	Spike	Block	2007 club
1	Zhong Weijun	20 April 1989	200 cm (6 ft 7 in)	88 kg (194 lb)	347 cm (137 in)	335 cm (132 in)	Army
2	Hu Song	21 February 1983	198 cm (6 ft 6 in)	75 kg (165 lb)	350 cm (140 in)	340 cm (130 in)	Beijing
3	Cui Xiaodong	17 November 1980	205 cm (6 ft 9 in)	80 kg (180 lb)	355 cm (140 in)	345 cm (136 in)	Shanghai
4	Yuan Zhi	29 September 1981	194 cm (6 ft 4 in)	95 kg (209 lb)	348 cm (137 in)	334 cm (131 in)	Liaoning
5	Guo Peng	1 July 1982	200 cm (6 ft 7 in)	84 kg (185 lb)	360 cm (140 in)	337 cm (133 in)	Army
6	Wang Haichuan	11 November 1979	200 cm (6 ft 7 in)	80 kg (180 lb)	355 cm (140 in)	340 cm (130 in)	Liaoning
7	Tang Miao	4 May 1982	204 cm (6 ft 8 in)	85 kg (187 lb)	355 cm (140 in)	345 cm (136 in)	Shanghai
8	Cui Jianjun	1 August 1985	192 cm (6 ft 4 in)	94 kg (207 lb)	350 cm (140 in)	335 cm (132 in)	Henan
9	Zhou Hong	1 October 1987	200 cm (6 ft 7 in)	75 kg (165 lb)	340 cm (130 in)	325 cm (128 in)	Jiangsu
10	Li Chun	1 April 1982	190 cm (6 ft 3 in)	82 kg (181 lb)	348 cm (137 in)	332 cm (131 in)	Army
11	Yu Dawei	21 June 1984	199 cm (6 ft 6 in)	90 kg (200 lb)	345 cm (136 in)	335 cm (132 in)	Shandong
12	Shen Qiong	5 September 1981	198 cm (6 ft 6 in)	84 kg (185 lb)	359 cm (141 in)	349 cm (137 in)	Shanghai
13	Liang Chunlong	25 March 1988	206 cm (6 ft 9 in)	91 kg (201 lb)	351 cm (138 in)	333 cm (131 in)	Liaoning
14	Jiang Fudong	10 January 1983	197 cm (6 ft 6 in)	85 kg (187 lb)	345 cm (136 in)	336 cm (132 in)	Sichuan
15	Chu Hui	11 February 1981	187 cm (6 ft 2 in)	70 kg (150 lb)	355 cm (140 in)	323 cm (127 in)	Beijing
16	Ren Qi	24 February 1984	174 cm (5 ft 9 in)	70 kg (150 lb)	322 cm (127 in)	312 cm (123 in)	Shanghai
17	Sui Shengsheng	30 May 1980	192 cm (6 ft 4 in)	75 kg (165 lb)	345 cm (136 in)	334 cm (131 in)	Liaoning
18	Fang Yingchao	3 August 1982	198 cm (6 ft 6 in)	79 kg (174 lb)	360 cm (140 in)	350 cm (140 in)	Shanghai
19	Xie Wenhao	16 July 1983	202 cm (6 ft 8 in)	80 kg (180 lb)	348 cm (137 in)	330 cm (130 in)	Army

== Cuba ==
The following is the roster in the 2007 FIVB Volleyball World League.

No.	Name	Date of birth	Height	Weight	Spike	Block	2007 club
1	Raidel Poey Romero	20 February 1982	198 cm (6 ft 6 in)	82 kg (181 lb)	360 cm (140 in)	340 cm (130 in)	Ciudad Habana
2	Tomás Aldazabal M.	30 May 1976	193 cm (6 ft 4 in)	83 kg (183 lb)	360 cm (140 in)	340 cm (130 in)	Ciudad Habana
3	Jorge Luis Sánchez Salgado	23 March 1985	197 cm (6 ft 6 in)	81 kg (179 lb)	345 cm (136 in)	313 cm (123 in)	La Habana
4	Yasser Portuondo	2 February 1983	196 cm (6 ft 5 in)	90 kg (200 lb)	351 cm (138 in)	319 cm (126 in)	Ciudad Habana
5	Miguel Angel Dalmau	21 September 1984	197 cm (6 ft 6 in)	83 kg (183 lb)	353 cm (139 in)	330 cm (130 in)	Villa Clara
6	Keibel Gutierrez Torna	6 May 1987	178 cm (5 ft 10 in)	80 kg (180 lb)	305 cm (120 in)	295 cm (116 in)	Villa Clara
7	Ariel Gil	3 August 1983	200 cm (6 ft 7 in)	90 kg (200 lb)	362 cm (143 in)	328 cm (129 in)	Matanzas
8	Pavel Pimienta Allen	3 August 1976	204 cm (6 ft 8 in)	96 kg (212 lb)	365 cm (144 in)	340 cm (130 in)	Camaguey
9	Michael Sánchez Bozhulev	5 June 1986	206 cm (6 ft 9 in)	100 kg (220 lb)	365 cm (144 in)	340 cm (130 in)	Al-Rayyan Sports Club
10	Rolando Jurquin Despaigne	7 June 1987	201 cm (6 ft 7 in)	95 kg (209 lb)	341 cm (134 in)	328 cm (129 in)	Santiago De Cuba
11	Yadier Sanchez Sierra	8 January 1987	200 cm (6 ft 7 in)	83 kg (183 lb)	335 cm (132 in)	335 cm (132 in)	Sada Cruzeiro Volei
12	Pedro Iznaga Ortiz	11 August 1986	195 cm (6 ft 5 in)	87 kg (192 lb)	340 cm (130 in)	333 cm (131 in)	Camaguey
13	Robertlandy Simón Aties	11 June 1987	206 cm (6 ft 9 in)	91 kg (201 lb)	358 cm (141 in)	326 cm (128 in)	Al-Rayyan Sports Club
14	Raydel Hierrezuelo Aguirre	14 July 1987	196 cm (6 ft 5 in)	87 kg (192 lb)	340 cm (130 in)	335 cm (132 in)	Ciudad Habana
15	Oreol Camejo Durruthy	22 July 1986	207 cm (6 ft 9 in)	94 kg (207 lb)	354 cm (139 in)	326 cm (128 in)	Lokomotiv Novosibirsk
16	Raydel Corrales Pouto	15 February 1982	201 cm (6 ft 7 in)	94 kg (207 lb)	355 cm (140 in)	325 cm (128 in)	Cienfuegos
17	Odelvis Dominico Speck	6 May 1977	205 cm (6 ft 9 in)	87 kg (192 lb)	360 cm (140 in)	356 cm (140 in)	Ciudad Habana
18	Yosmany Díaz Carmenate	8 January 1988	196 cm (6 ft 5 in)	89 kg (196 lb)	358 cm (141 in)	328 cm (129 in)	Ciudad Habana
19	Fernandez Pedro Lopez	10 October 1986	198 cm (6 ft 6 in)	84 kg (185 lb)	340 cm (130 in)	325 cm (128 in)	Santi Spiritu

== Egypt ==
The following is the roster in the 2007 FIVB Volleyball World League.

No.	Name	Date of birth	Height	Weight	Spike	Block	2007 club
1	Hamdy Awad	14 April 1972	202 cm (6 ft 8 in)	105 kg (231 lb)	346 cm (136 in)	327 cm (129 in)	AHLY
2	Abdallah Bekhit	10 October 1983	198 cm (6 ft 6 in)	72 kg (159 lb)	352 cm (139 in)	331 cm (130 in)	AHLY
3	Mohamed Gabal	21 January 1984	195 cm (6 ft 5 in)	97 kg (214 lb)	345 cm (136 in)	320 cm (130 in)	El Gaish
4	Ahmed Abdelhay	19 August 1984	197 cm (6 ft 6 in)	87 kg (192 lb)	342 cm (135 in)	316 cm (124 in)	ARMY CLUB
5	Osama Bekheit	12 January 1977	192 cm (6 ft 4 in)	72 kg (159 lb)	335 cm (132 in)	326 cm (128 in)	AHLY
6	Wael Alaydy	8 December 1971	178 cm (5 ft 10 in)	78 kg (172 lb)	320 cm (130 in)	300 cm (120 in)	ZAMALEK
7	Ashraf Abouelhassan	17 May 1975	186 cm (6 ft 1 in)	86 kg (190 lb)	325 cm (128 in)	318 cm (125 in)	ZAMALEK
8	Saleh Youssef	25 July 1982	194 cm (6 ft 4 in)	91 kg (201 lb)	345 cm (136 in)	332 cm (131 in)	Zamalek
9	Mohamed El Mahdy	2 September 1978	196 cm (6 ft 5 in)	96 kg (212 lb)	340 cm (130 in)	335 cm (132 in)	AHLY
10	Mahmoud Abdel Aziz	7 April 1975	195 cm (6 ft 5 in)	105 kg (231 lb)	340 cm (130 in)	325 cm (128 in)	ZAMALEK
11	Mohamed Elnafrawy	9 June 1983	200 cm (6 ft 7 in)	92 kg (203 lb)	335 cm (132 in)	320 cm (130 in)	AHLY
12	Mahmoud Ismail (javelin)	7 April 1986	193 cm (6 ft 4 in)	89 kg (196 lb)	348 cm (137 in)	341 cm (134 in)	ZAMALEK
13	Mohamed Badawy	11 January 1986	197 cm (6 ft 6 in)	97 kg (214 lb)	351 cm (138 in)	343 cm (135 in)	ZAMALEK
14	Hossameldin Gomaa	15 February 1984	199 cm (6 ft 6 in)	92 kg (203 lb)	344 cm (135 in)	324 cm (128 in)	AHLY
15	Aly Elian	1 February 1983	204 cm (6 ft 8 in)	91 kg (201 lb)	350 cm (140 in)	340 cm (130 in)	ZAMALEK
16	Mohamed Seif Elnasr	5 September 1983	202 cm (6 ft 8 in)	89 kg (196 lb)	345 cm (136 in)	339 cm (133 in)	ZAMALEK
17	Mahmoud Abd El kader	12 May 1985	195 cm (6 ft 5 in)	94 kg (207 lb)	342 cm (135 in)	316 cm (124 in)	AHLY
18	Mohamed El Daabousi	1 March 1987	202 cm (6 ft 8 in)	107 kg (236 lb)	348 cm (137 in)	342 cm (135 in)	ZAMALEK
19	Ahmed Elhefnawy	5 September 1972	188 cm (6 ft 2 in)	80 kg (180 lb)	0 cm (0 in)	0 cm (0 in)	ZAMALEK

== Finland ==
The following is the roster in the 2007 FIVB Volleyball World League.

No.	Name	Date of birth	Height	Weight	Spike	Block	2007 club
1	Tapio Kangasniemi	7 March 1979	186 cm (6 ft 1 in)	87 kg (192 lb)	335 cm (132 in)	300 cm (120 in)	Tampereen Isku-Volley (FIN)
2	Joni Markkula	10 February 1983	192 cm (6 ft 4 in)	84 kg (185 lb)	330 cm (130 in)	311 cm (122 in)	Vammalan Lentopallo (FIN)
3	Mikko Esko	3 September 1978	198 cm (6 ft 6 in)	89 kg (196 lb)	331 cm (130 in)	319 cm (126 in)	Nizhni Novgorod (RUS)
4	Antti Esko	30 July 1982	190 cm (6 ft 3 in)	86 kg (190 lb)	335 cm (132 in)	314 cm (124 in)	Vammalan Lentopallo (FIN)
5	Antti Siltala	14 March 1984	193 cm (6 ft 4 in)	90 kg (200 lb)	348 cm (137 in)	330 cm (130 in)	Jenisei Krasnojarsk (RUS)
6	Tuomas Sammelvuo	16 February 1976	192 cm (6 ft 4 in)	90 kg (200 lb)	341 cm (134 in)	315 cm (124 in)	San Giustino (ITA)
7	Matti Hietanen	3 January 1983	199 cm (6 ft 6 in)	93 kg (205 lb)	350 cm (140 in)	320 cm (130 in)	Gdansk (POL)
8	Ilkka Sammelvuo	21 January 1979	197 cm (6 ft 6 in)	91 kg (201 lb)	345 cm (136 in)	315 cm (124 in)	Cambrai (FRA)
9	Teppo Heikkilä	10 March 1983	187 cm (6 ft 2 in)	77 kg (170 lb)	336 cm (132 in)	313 cm (123 in)	Kempeleen Lentopallo (FIN)
10	Miika Heikkinen	6 August 1977	200 cm (6 ft 7 in)	94 kg (207 lb)	350 cm (140 in)	325 cm (128 in)	Innsbruck (AUT)
11	Olli-Pekka Ojansivu	31 December 1987	197 cm (6 ft 6 in)	90 kg (200 lb)	344 cm (135 in)	325 cm (128 in)	Kokkolan Tiikerit (FIN)
12	Olli Kunnari	2 February 1982	197 cm (6 ft 6 in)	85 kg (187 lb)	342 cm (135 in)	315 cm (124 in)	Vammalan Lentopallo (FIN)
13	Mikko Oivanen	26 May 1986	198 cm (6 ft 6 in)	92 kg (203 lb)	360 cm (140 in)	320 cm (130 in)	Czarni Radom (POL)
14	Konstantin Shumov	15 February 1985	205 cm (6 ft 9 in)	98 kg (216 lb)	351 cm (138 in)	331 cm (130 in)	Treia (ITA)
15	Matti Oivanen	26 May 1986	198 cm (6 ft 6 in)	90 kg (200 lb)	355 cm (140 in)	320 cm (130 in)	Hurrikaani-Loimaa (FIN)
16	Urpo Sivula	15 March 1988	195 cm (6 ft 5 in)	100 kg (220 lb)	350 cm (140 in)	330 cm (130 in)	Raision Loimu (FIN)
17	Tuukka Anttila	13 January 1980	204 cm (6 ft 8 in)	95 kg (209 lb)	355 cm (140 in)	335 cm (132 in)	Salon Piivolley (FIN)
18	Jukka Lehtonen	22 February 1982	197 cm (6 ft 6 in)	90 kg (200 lb)	346 cm (136 in)	325 cm (128 in)	LEKA Volley (FIN)
19	Jarmo Kaaretkoski	12 December 1982	186 cm (6 ft 1 in)	80 kg (180 lb)	316 cm (124 in)	294 cm (116 in)	Santasport (FIN)

== France ==
The following is the roster in the 2007 FIVB Volleyball World League.

No.	Name	Date of birth	Height	Weight	Spike	Block	2007 club
1	Xavier Kapfer	7 November 1981	191 cm (6 ft 3 in)	96 kg (212 lb)	354 cm (139 in)	320 cm (130 in)	Fart Kielce
2	Bojidar Slavev	30 June 1984	203 cm (6 ft 8 in)	95 kg (209 lb)	348 cm (137 in)	325 cm (128 in)	Toulouse
3	Gérald Hardy-Dessources	9 February 1983	197 cm (6 ft 6 in)	93 kg (205 lb)	360 cm (140 in)	335 cm (132 in)	Tours VB
4	Antonin Rouzier	18 August 1986	201 cm (6 ft 7 in)	100 kg (220 lb)	350 cm (140 in)	330 cm (130 in)	Ankara
5	Romain Vadeleux	12 February 1983	196 cm (6 ft 5 in)	100 kg (220 lb)	355 cm (140 in)	335 cm (132 in)	Lube Macerata
6	Jean-Philippe Sol	1 January 1986	198 cm (6 ft 6 in)	92 kg (203 lb)	345 cm (136 in)	325 cm (128 in)	Arago de Sète
7	Stéphane Antiga	3 February 1976	200 cm (6 ft 7 in)	94 kg (207 lb)	347 cm (137 in)	327 cm (129 in)	PGE Skra
8	Ludovic Castard	18 January 1983	197 cm (6 ft 6 in)	95 kg (209 lb)	348 cm (137 in)	325 cm (128 in)	AS Cannes
9	Frantz Granvorka	10 March 1976	195 cm (6 ft 5 in)	90 kg (200 lb)	364 cm (143 in)	327 cm (129 in)	Tarente
10	Vincent Montmeát	1 September 1977	196 cm (6 ft 5 in)	88 kg (194 lb)	348 cm (137 in)	330 cm (130 in)	Tourcoing
11	Loïc Le Marrec	1 March 1977	190 cm (6 ft 3 in)	82 kg (181 lb)	330 cm (130 in)	312 cm (123 in)	Tours VB
13	Pierre Pujol	13 July 1984	186 cm (6 ft 1 in)	90 kg (200 lb)	335 cm (132 in)	315 cm (124 in)	AS Cannes
14	Loic Geiler	14 April 1984	198 cm (6 ft 6 in)	85 kg (187 lb)	352 cm (139 in)	328 cm (129 in)	AS Cannes
15	Guillaume Samica	28 September 1981	198 cm (6 ft 6 in)	88 kg (194 lb)	355 cm (140 in)	327 cm (129 in)	Zaksa
16	Toafa Takaniko	29 May 1985	194 cm (6 ft 4 in)	92 kg (203 lb)	340 cm (130 in)	330 cm (130 in)	Arago de Sète
17	Oliver Kieffer	27 August 1979	200 cm (6 ft 7 in)	85 kg (187 lb)	355 cm (140 in)	335 cm (132 in)	Stade Poitevin
18	Jean-François Exiga	9 March 1982	176 cm (5 ft 9 in)	75 kg (165 lb)	320 cm (130 in)	312 cm (123 in)	Tours VB
19	Julien Lemay	17 May 1982	181 cm (5 ft 11 in)	71 kg (157 lb)	335 cm (132 in)	320 cm (130 in)	Volley Club Menen

== Italy ==
The following is the roster in the 2007 FIVB Volleyball World League.

No.	Name	Date of birth	Height	Weight	Spike	Block	2007 club
1	Luigi Mastrangelo	17 August 1975	202 cm (6 ft 8 in)	90 kg (200 lb)	368 cm (145 in)	336 cm (132 in)	Bre banca Lannuti Cuneo
3	Simone Parodi	16 June 1986	196 cm (6 ft 5 in)	82 kg (181 lb)	350 cm (140 in)	335 cm (132 in)	Volley Lube
4	Marco Nuti	2 October 1970	190 cm (6 ft 3 in)	83 kg (183 lb)	343 cm (135 in)	319 cm (126 in)	Prisma
5	Giordano Mattera	29 August 1983	198 cm (6 ft 6 in)	89 kg (196 lb)	327 cm (129 in)	313 cm (123 in)	Maggiora
6	Alessandro Farina	16 May 1976	182 cm (6 ft 0 in)	80 kg (180 lb)	342 cm (135 in)	310 cm (120 in)	Sisley
7	Alessandro Paparoni	17 August 1981	191 cm (6 ft 3 in)	75 kg (165 lb)	340 cm (130 in)	314 cm (124 in)	Lube Banca Marche
8	Alberto Cisolla	10 October 1977	197 cm (6 ft 6 in)	86 kg (190 lb)	367 cm (144 in)	345 cm (136 in)	Sisley
10	Luca Tencati	16 March 1979	200 cm (6 ft 7 in)	97 kg (214 lb)	350 cm (140 in)	330 cm (130 in)	Cimone
11	Mauro Gavotto	16 April 1979	201 cm (6 ft 7 in)	88 kg (194 lb)	350 cm (140 in)	330 cm (130 in)	Acqua Paradiso
12	Matteo Martino	28 January 1987	197 cm (6 ft 6 in)	84 kg (185 lb)	340 cm (130 in)	322 cm (127 in)	Lube Banca Marche
13	Lorenzo Perazzolo	30 October 1984	195 cm (6 ft 5 in)	92 kg (203 lb)	349 cm (137 in)	321 cm (126 in)	Pallavolo Padova
14	Alessandro Fei	29 November 1978	204 cm (6 ft 8 in)	90 kg (200 lb)	358 cm (141 in)	336 cm (132 in)	Copra Elior Piacenza
16	Cristian Casoli	27 January 1975	192 cm (6 ft 4 in)	85 kg (187 lb)	345 cm (136 in)	315 cm (124 in)	Trentino Volley
17	Andrea Sala	27 December 1978	202 cm (6 ft 8 in)	96 kg (212 lb)	359 cm (141 in)	340 cm (130 in)	Trentino Betclic
18	Matej Černič	13 September 1978	192 cm (6 ft 4 in)	80 kg (180 lb)	354 cm (139 in)	335 cm (132 in)	Resovia
19	Rocco Barone	14 December 1987	201 cm (6 ft 7 in)	86 kg (190 lb)	346 cm (136 in)	327 cm (129 in)	Tonno Callipo

== Japan ==
The following is the roster in the 2007 FIVB Volleyball World League.

No.	Name	Date of birth	Height	Weight	Spike	Block	2007 club
2	Hiroaki Kawaura	13 November 1975	200 cm (6 ft 7 in)	82 kg (181 lb)	357 cm (141 in)	340 cm (130 in)	Toyoda Gosei Trefuerza
4	Shunichi Shimano	5 January 1981	180 cm (5 ft 11 in)	65 kg (143 lb)	335 cm (132 in)	320 cm (130 in)	Toyoda Gosei Trefuerza
5	Hiroyuki Kai	17 July 1978	189 cm (6 ft 2 in)	89 kg (196 lb)	330 cm (130 in)	320 cm (130 in)	Toyoda Gosei Trefuerza
6	Ryuji Naohiro	1 October 1978	198 cm (6 ft 6 in)	84 kg (185 lb)	350 cm (140 in)	340 cm (130 in)	JT Thunders
7	Takahiro Yamamoto	12 July 1978	201 cm (6 ft 7 in)	98 kg (216 lb)	345 cm (136 in)	335 cm (132 in)	Panasonic Panthers
8	Yusuke Imada	20 February 1981	195 cm (6 ft 5 in)	78 kg (172 lb)	340 cm (130 in)	320 cm (130 in)	Toray Arrows
9	Takaaki Tomimatsu	20 July 1984	191 cm (6 ft 3 in)	82 kg (181 lb)	350 cm (140 in)	340 cm (130 in)	Toray Arrows
10	Osamu Tanabe	10 April 1979	181 cm (5 ft 11 in)	73 kg (161 lb)	330 cm (130 in)	300 cm (120 in)	Toray Arrows
11	Yoshihiko Matsumoto	7 January 1981	193 cm (6 ft 4 in)	80 kg (180 lb)	340 cm (130 in)	330 cm (130 in)	Sakai Blazers
12	Kota Yamamura	20 October 1980	205 cm (6 ft 9 in)	95 kg (209 lb)	350 cm (140 in)	335 cm (132 in)	Suntory Sunbirds
13	Yuta Abe	8 August 1981	191 cm (6 ft 3 in)	85 kg (187 lb)	342 cm (135 in)	320 cm (130 in)	Suntory Sunbirds
14	Ryu Morishige	18 July 1980	191 cm (6 ft 3 in)	83 kg (183 lb)	346 cm (136 in)	330 cm (130 in)	Toyoda-Gosei Trefuerza
15	Katsutoshi Tsumagari	2 November 1975	183 cm (6 ft 0 in)	78 kg (172 lb)	320 cm (130 in)	305 cm (120 in)	Suntory Sunbirds
16	Yusuke Ishijima	9 January 1984	197 cm (6 ft 6 in)	102 kg (225 lb)	345 cm (136 in)	335 cm (132 in)	Sakai Blazers
17	Yu Koshikawa	30 June 1984	189 cm (6 ft 2 in)	87 kg (192 lb)	340 cm (130 in)	320 cm (130 in)	JT Thunders
18	Kosuke Tomonaga	22 July 1980	184 cm (6 ft 0 in)	83 kg (183 lb)	320 cm (130 in)	310 cm (120 in)	Sakai Blazers
19	Kunihiro Shimizu	11 August 1986	192 cm (6 ft 4 in)	94 kg (207 lb)	348 cm (137 in)	330 cm (130 in)	Tokai Univ. Volleyball Club

== South Korea ==
The following is the roster in the 2007 FIVB Volleyball World League.

No.	Name	Date of birth	Height	Weight	Spike	Block	2007 club
1	Kim Hak-min	4 September 1983	193 cm (6 ft 4 in)	81 kg (179 lb)	327 cm (129 in)	319 cm (126 in)	Korean Airlines
2	You Kwang-woo	22 April 1985	185 cm (6 ft 1 in)	85 kg (187 lb)	311 cm (122 in)	300 cm (120 in)	Samsung fire & Marine Insuranc
3	Kwon Young-min	5 July 1980	190 cm (6 ft 3 in)	82 kg (181 lb)	315 cm (124 in)	309 cm (122 in)	Hyundai Capital
4	Moon Sung-min	14 September 1986	198 cm (6 ft 6 in)	89 kg (196 lb)	329 cm (130 in)	321 cm (126 in)	Hyundai Capital
5	Yeo Oh-hyun	2 September 1978	175 cm (5 ft 9 in)	70 kg (150 lb)	280 cm (110 in)	279 cm (110 in)	Hyundai Capital
6	Choi Tae-Woong	9 April 1976	185 cm (6 ft 1 in)	80 kg (180 lb)	315 cm (124 in)	302 cm (119 in)	Hyundai Capital
7	Ko Hee-jin	13 July 1980	198 cm (6 ft 6 in)	91 kg (201 lb)	330 cm (130 in)	320 cm (130 in)	Samsung Fire&Marine Insurance
8	Ha Hyun-yong	9 May 1982	198 cm (6 ft 6 in)	88 kg (194 lb)	330 cm (130 in)	322 cm (127 in)	LIG Insurance
9	Shin Young-soo	1 July 1982	197 cm (6 ft 6 in)	90 kg (200 lb)	335 cm (132 in)	313 cm (123 in)	Korean Airlines co.
10	Yun Bong-woo	20 January 1982	199 cm (6 ft 6 in)	88 kg (194 lb)	332 cm (131 in)	320 cm (130 in)	Hyundai Capital
11	Lee Kyung-Soo	27 April 1979	198 cm (6 ft 6 in)	90 kg (200 lb)	332 cm (131 in)	315 cm (124 in)	LIG Insurance
12	Song In-seok	14 August 1978	197 cm (6 ft 6 in)	87 kg (192 lb)	335 cm (132 in)	325 cm (128 in)	Hyundai Capital
13	Park Chul-woo	25 July 1985	198 cm (6 ft 6 in)	88 kg (194 lb)	332 cm (131 in)	319 cm (126 in)	Samsung Fire&Marine Insurance
14	Kim Yo-han	16 August 1985	200 cm (6 ft 7 in)	95 kg (209 lb)	335 cm (132 in)	326 cm (128 in)	LIG Insurance
15	Kang Dong-jin	31 August 1983	192 cm (6 ft 4 in)	86 kg (190 lb)	322 cm (127 in)	311 cm (122 in)	Korean Airlines co.
16	Song Byung-il	3 April 1983	196 cm (6 ft 5 in)	85 kg (187 lb)	317 cm (125 in)	297 cm (117 in)	Woori Capital
17	Ha Kyoung-min	27 July 1982	201 cm (6 ft 7 in)	83 kg (183 lb)	320 cm (130 in)	310 cm (120 in)	Kepco 45
18	Shin Yung-suk	4 October 1986	198 cm (6 ft 6 in)	90 kg (200 lb)	335 cm (132 in)	325 cm (128 in)	Korean Army
19	Choi Bu-sik	12 July 1978	180 cm (5 ft 11 in)	80 kg (180 lb)	290 cm (110 in)	281 cm (111 in)	Korean Airlines

== Poland ==
The following is the roster in the 2007 FIVB Volleyball World League.

No.	Name	Date of birth	Height	Weight	Spike	Block	2007 club
1	Grzegorz Pilarz	12 February 1980	190 cm (6 ft 3 in)	82 kg (181 lb)	335 cm (132 in)	315 cm (124 in)	Resovia
2	Michal Winiarski	28 September 1983	200 cm (6 ft 7 in)	82 kg (181 lb)	345 cm (136 in)	332 cm (131 in)	Fakiel Novy Urengoy
3	Piotr Gruszka	8 March 1977	206 cm (6 ft 9 in)	102 kg (225 lb)	355 cm (140 in)	330 cm (130 in)	GS RoburAngelo Costa
4	Daniel Plinski	10 December 1978	204 cm (6 ft 8 in)	100 kg (220 lb)	345 cm (136 in)	325 cm (128 in)	PGE Skra
5	Pawel Zagumny	18 October 1977	200 cm (6 ft 7 in)	88 kg (194 lb)	336 cm (132 in)	317 cm (125 in)	ZAKSA
6	Zbigniew Bartman	4 May 1987	198 cm (6 ft 6 in)	95 kg (209 lb)	352 cm (139 in)	320 cm (130 in)	Resovia
7	Wojciech Grzyb	4 January 1981	205 cm (6 ft 9 in)	104 kg (229 lb)	360 cm (140 in)	340 cm (130 in)	LOTOS Trefl
8	Robert Prygiel	17 April 1976	200 cm (6 ft 7 in)	100 kg (220 lb)	350 cm (140 in)	331 cm (130 in)	KS Jastrzebski Wegiel
9	Lukasz Zygadlo	2 August 1979	200 cm (6 ft 7 in)	89 kg (196 lb)	337 cm (133 in)	325 cm (128 in)	Zienit Kazan
10	Mariusz Wlazly	4 August 1983	194 cm (6 ft 4 in)	80 kg (180 lb)	360 cm (140 in)	329 cm (130 in)	PGE Skra
11	Lukasz Kadziewicz	20 September 1980	206 cm (6 ft 9 in)	84 kg (185 lb)	360 cm (140 in)	335 cm (132 in)	Al-Arabi
12	Grzegorz Szymanski	12 July 1978	202 cm (6 ft 8 in)	92 kg (203 lb)	355 cm (140 in)	335 cm (132 in)	AZS UWM
13	Sebastian Swiderski	26 June 1977	193 cm (6 ft 4 in)	88 kg (194 lb)	354 cm (139 in)	325 cm (128 in)	ZAKSA
14	Lukasz Perlowski	3 April 1984	203 cm (6 ft 8 in)	88 kg (194 lb)	355 cm (140 in)	335 cm (132 in)	Resovia
15	Piotr Gacek	16 September 1978	185 cm (6 ft 1 in)	78 kg (172 lb)	325 cm (128 in)	305 cm (120 in)	LOTOS Trefl
16	Krzysztof Ignaczak	15 May 1978	188 cm (6 ft 2 in)	86 kg (190 lb)	330 cm (130 in)	315 cm (124 in)	Resovia
18	Marcin Mozdzonek	9 February 1985	211 cm (6 ft 11 in)	93 kg (205 lb)	358 cm (141 in)	338 cm (133 in)	Halkbank
19	Bartosz Kurek	29 August 1988	205 cm (6 ft 9 in)	87 kg (192 lb)	352 cm (139 in)	326 cm (128 in)	Lube Banca Marche

== Serbia ==
The following is the roster in the 2007 FIVB Volleyball World League.

No.	Name	Date of birth	Height	Weight	Spike	Block	2007 club
1	Branimir Perić	26 May 1981	198 cm (6 ft 6 in)	90 kg (200 lb)	335 cm (132 in)	320 cm (130 in)	Tiscali Cagliari (ITA)
2	Dejan Bojović	3 April 1983	198 cm (6 ft 6 in)	96 kg (212 lb)	360 cm (140 in)	345 cm (136 in)	Toray Arrows (JPN)
3	Novica Bjelica	9 February 1983	202 cm (6 ft 8 in)	97 kg (214 lb)	343 cm (135 in)	324 cm (128 in)	Copra Piacenza (ITA)
4	Bojan Janic	11 March 1982	198 cm (6 ft 6 in)	83 kg (183 lb)	345 cm (136 in)	322 cm (127 in)	Trefl Pilka Siatkowa (POL)
5	Aleksandar Mitrović	24 September 1982	195 cm (6 ft 5 in)	93 kg (205 lb)	350 cm (140 in)	324 cm (128 in)	Halk Bankasi SK Ankara (TUR)
6	Nikola Kovačević	14 February 1983	193 cm (6 ft 4 in)	78 kg (172 lb)	350 cm (140 in)	340 cm (130 in)	Calzedonia Verona (ITA)
7	Dragan Stanković	18 October 1985	205 cm (6 ft 9 in)	94 kg (207 lb)	343 cm (135 in)	333 cm (131 in)	Lube Banka Macerata (ITA)
8	Marko Samardžić	22 February 1983	190 cm (6 ft 3 in)	82 kg (181 lb)	326 cm (128 in)	310 cm (120 in)	Trefl Pilka Siatkowa (POL)
9	Vlado Petković	6 January 1983	198 cm (6 ft 6 in)	97 kg (214 lb)	325 cm (128 in)	318 cm (125 in)	Shahrdari Urmia SC (IRN)
10	Nemanja Dukić	23 April 1983	194 cm (6 ft 4 in)	87 kg (192 lb)	345 cm (136 in)	330 cm (130 in)	Buducnost PB Podgorica (MNE)
11	Miloš Nikić	31 March 1986	194 cm (6 ft 4 in)	79 kg (174 lb)	350 cm (140 in)	330 cm (130 in)	Gubernia Nizhniy Novgorod (RUS)
12	Andrija Gerić	24 January 1977	203 cm (6 ft 8 in)	101 kg (223 lb)	350 cm (140 in)	323 cm (127 in)	Panathinaikos (GRE)
13	Tomislav Dokić	27 February 1986	204 cm (6 ft 8 in)	97 kg (214 lb)	355 cm (140 in)	325 cm (128 in)	Foinikas SC Syros Isleand (GRE)
14	Ivan Miljković	13 September 1979	206 cm (6 ft 9 in)	104 kg (229 lb)	354 cm (139 in)	333 cm (131 in)	Fenerbahçe (TUR)
15	Saša Starović	19 October 1988	207 cm (6 ft 9 in)	89 kg (196 lb)	335 cm (132 in)	321 cm (126 in)	Andreoli Latina (ITA)
16	Ivan Ilić	19 December 1976	194 cm (6 ft 4 in)	85 kg (187 lb)	330 cm (130 in)	315 cm (124 in)	Aon HotVolleys Vienna (AUT)
17	Dejan Radić	6 November 1984	200 cm (6 ft 7 in)	95 kg (209 lb)	360 cm (140 in)	340 cm (130 in)	Vojvodina NS Seme (SRB)
18	Marko Podraščanin	29 August 1987	203 cm (6 ft 8 in)	100 kg (220 lb)	343 cm (135 in)	326 cm (128 in)	Lube Banka Macerata (ITA)
19	Nikola Rosić	5 August 1984	192 cm (6 ft 4 in)	85 kg (187 lb)	328 cm (129 in)	315 cm (124 in)	Energy Investments Lugano (SUI)

== Russia ==
The following is the roster in the 2007 FIVB Volleyball World League.

No.	Name	Date of birth	Height	Weight	Spike	Block	2007 club
1	Alexander Korneev	11 September 1980	200 cm (6 ft 7 in)	96 kg (212 lb)	348 cm (137 in)	339 cm (133 in)	VC Dinamo Moscow
3	Alexander Volkov	14 February 1985	210 cm (6 ft 11 in)	90 kg (200 lb)	360 cm (140 in)	335 cm (132 in)	VC Zenit Kazan
4	Taras Khtey	22 May 1982	205 cm (6 ft 9 in)	109 kg (240 lb)	351 cm (138 in)	339 cm (133 in)	VC Belogorie
5	Pavel Abramov	23 April 1979	200 cm (6 ft 7 in)	87 kg (192 lb)	347 cm (137 in)	336 cm (132 in)	VC Iskra Odintsovo
9	Vadim Khamuttskikh	26 November 1969	196 cm (6 ft 5 in)	85 kg (187 lb)	342 cm (135 in)	331 cm (130 in)	Fakel Novy Urengoy
10	Roman Danilov	4 January 1985	205 cm (6 ft 9 in)	90 kg (200 lb)	356 cm (140 in)	325 cm (128 in)	VC Lokomotiv Novosibirsk
11	Oleg Samsonychev	22 March 1982	198 cm (6 ft 6 in)	96 kg (212 lb)	338 cm (133 in)	330 cm (130 in)	VC Iskra Odintsovo
12	Alexander Ianutov	19 June 1983	195 cm (6 ft 5 in)	92 kg (203 lb)	337 cm (133 in)	329 cm (130 in)	VC Lokomotiv Novosibirsk
14	Alexander Abrosimov	25 August 1983	207 cm (6 ft 9 in)	98 kg (216 lb)	341 cm (134 in)	325 cm (128 in)	VC Lokomotiv Novosibirsk
15	Maxim Tereshin	5 August 1979	200 cm (6 ft 7 in)	93 kg (205 lb)	353 cm (139 in)	341 cm (134 in)	VC Neftyanik Orenburg
19	Vitaly Evdoshenko	3 May 1983	183 cm (6 ft 0 in)	77 kg (170 lb)	331 cm (130 in)	320 cm (130 in)	VC Lokomotiv Novosibirsk

== United States ==
The following is the roster in the 2007 FIVB Volleyball World League.

No.	Name	Date of birth	Height	Weight	Spike	Block	2007 club
1	Lloy Ball	17 February 1972	203 cm (6 ft 8 in)	95 kg (209 lb)	351 cm (138 in)	316 cm (124 in)	ZENIT Kazan
2	Sean Rooney	13 November 1982	206 cm (6 ft 9 in)	100 kg (220 lb)	354 cm (139 in)	336 cm (132 in)	Woori Card Hansae
4	Richard Brandon Taliaferro	28 September 1977	196 cm (6 ft 5 in)	100 kg (220 lb)	342 cm (135 in)	325 cm (128 in)	ACH Volley
5	Richard Lambourne	6 May 1975	190 cm (6 ft 3 in)	90 kg (200 lb)	324 cm (128 in)	312 cm (123 in)	USA Men's Volleyball Team
6	Phillip Eatherton	2 January 1974	206 cm (6 ft 9 in)	101 kg (223 lb)	356 cm (140 in)	335 cm (132 in)	AZS Czestochowa
7	David Lee	8 March 1982	203 cm (6 ft 8 in)	105 kg (231 lb)	350 cm (140 in)	325 cm (128 in)	Lokomotiv Novosibirsk
8	William Reid Priddy	1 October 1977	194 cm (6 ft 4 in)	89 kg (196 lb)	353 cm (139 in)	330 cm (130 in)	USA Men's Volleyball Team
9	Ryan Millar	22 January 1978	204 cm (6 ft 8 in)	98 kg (216 lb)	354 cm (139 in)	326 cm (128 in)	Lokomotiv Novosibirsk
10	Riley Salmon	2 July 1976	198 cm (6 ft 6 in)	89 kg (196 lb)	345 cm (136 in)	331 cm (130 in)	Corozal Plataneros
11	Brook Billings	30 April 1980	196 cm (6 ft 5 in)	95 kg (209 lb)	351 cm (138 in)	331 cm (130 in)	Fenerbahce
12	Thomas Hoff	9 June 1973	198 cm (6 ft 6 in)	94 kg (207 lb)	353 cm (139 in)	333 cm (131 in)	USA Men's Volleyball Team
13	Clayton Stanley	20 January 1978	205 cm (6 ft 9 in)	104 kg (229 lb)	357 cm (141 in)	332 cm (131 in)	Ural UFA
14	Kevin Hansen	19 March 1982	196 cm (6 ft 5 in)	93 kg (205 lb)	349 cm (137 in)	330 cm (130 in)	Arkas Spor
15	Gabriel Gardner	18 March 1976	209 cm (6 ft 10 in)	103 kg (227 lb)	353 cm (139 in)	335 cm (132 in)	USA Men's Volleyball Team
16	David McKienzie	5 July 1979	193 cm (6 ft 4 in)	95 kg (209 lb)	358 cm (141 in)	340 cm (130 in)	Kuwait Sporting Club
17	Delano Thomas	26 January 1983	201 cm (6 ft 7 in)	95 kg (209 lb)	366 cm (144 in)	339 cm (133 in)	ACH Volley
19	Alfredo Reft	15 December 1982	178 cm (5 ft 10 in)	83 kg (183 lb)	319 cm (126 in)	309 cm (122 in)	USA Men's Volleyball Team
