= 2008 FIVB Volleyball World League squads =

This article show all participating team squads at the 2008 FIVB Volleyball World League, played by 16 countries from 13 June to 27 July 2008. The Final Round was held in Rio de Janeiro, Brazil.

== Brazil ==
The following is the Brazilian roster in the 2008 FIVB Volleyball World League.

No.	Name	Date of birth	Height	Weight	Spike	Block	2008 club
1	Bruno Rezende	2 July 1986	190 cm (6 ft 3 in)	76 kg (168 lb)	323 cm (127 in)	302 cm (119 in)	RJX
2	Marcelo Elgarten	9 November 1974	183 cm (6 ft 0 in)	78 kg (172 lb)	321 cm (126 in)	308 cm (121 in)	Panathinaikos
3	Eder Carbonera	19 October 1983	204 cm (6 ft 8 in)	101 kg (223 lb)	350 cm (140 in)	330 cm (130 in)	Sada Cruzeiro Volei
4	André Heller	17 December 1975	199 cm (6 ft 6 in)	93 kg (205 lb)	339 cm (133 in)	321 cm (126 in)	Pallavolo Modena
5	Sidnei Santos	9 July 1982	203 cm (6 ft 8 in)	90 kg (200 lb)	348 cm (137 in)	335 cm (132 in)	SESI
6	Samuel Fuchs	4 March 1984	200 cm (6 ft 7 in)	89 kg (196 lb)	342 cm (135 in)	316 cm (124 in)	Minas Tênis Clube
7	Gilberto Godoy Filho	23 December 1976	192 cm (6 ft 4 in)	85 kg (187 lb)	325 cm (128 in)	312 cm (123 in)	Cimed/Sky Sports
8	Murilo Endres	3 May 1981	190 cm (6 ft 3 in)	76 kg (168 lb)	343 cm (135 in)	319 cm (126 in)	SESI
9	André Nascimento	4 March 1979	195 cm (6 ft 5 in)	95 kg (209 lb)	340 cm (130 in)	320 cm (130 in)	Pallavolo Modena
10	Sérgio Dutra Santos	15 October 1975	184 cm (6 ft 0 in)	78 kg (172 lb)	325 cm (128 in)	310 cm (120 in)	SESI
11	Anderson Rodrigues	21 May 1974	190 cm (6 ft 3 in)	95 kg (209 lb)	330 cm (130 in)	321 cm (126 in)	Cimed
12	Nalbert Bitencourt	9 March 1974	195 cm (6 ft 5 in)	82 kg (181 lb)	329 cm (130 in)	309 cm (122 in)	Minas Tênis Clube
13	Gustavo Endres	23 August 1975	203 cm (6 ft 8 in)	98 kg (216 lb)	337 cm (133 in)	325 cm (128 in)	Cimed/Sky Sports
14	Rodrigo Santana	17 April 1979	205 cm (6 ft 9 in)	85 kg (187 lb)	350 cm (140 in)	328 cm (129 in)	Al-Rayyan
15	Manius Abbadi	13 April 1976	202 cm (6 ft 8 in)	86 kg (190 lb)	328 cm (129 in)	318 cm (125 in)	Piemonte Volley
16	Lucas Saatkamp	6 March 1986	209 cm (6 ft 10 in)	101 kg (223 lb)	340 cm (130 in)	321 cm (126 in)	SESI
17	Marlon Yared	27 July 1977	190 cm (6 ft 3 in)	80 kg (180 lb)	315 cm (124 in)	304 cm (120 in)	VIVO/Minas Tênis Clube
18	Dante Amaral	30 September 1980	201 cm (6 ft 7 in)	86 kg (190 lb)	345 cm (136 in)	327 cm (129 in)	Panasonic Panthers
19	Alan Domingos	15 February 1980	190 cm (6 ft 3 in)	89 kg (196 lb)	354 cm (139 in)	323 cm (127 in)	Campinas

== Bulgaria ==
The following is the roster in the 2008 FIVB Volleyball World League.

No.	Name	Date of birth	Height	Weight	Spike	Block	2008 club
1	Evgeni Ivanov	3 June 1974	210 cm (6 ft 11 in)	98 kg (216 lb)	351 cm (138 in)	340 cm (130 in)	Jastrzebski Wegiel SA
2	Hristo Tsvetanov	29 March 1978	198 cm (6 ft 6 in)	85 kg (187 lb)	345 cm (136 in)	330 cm (130 in)	ASUL Lyon
3	Andrey Zhekov	12 March 1980	190 cm (6 ft 3 in)	82 kg (181 lb)	340 cm (130 in)	326 cm (128 in)	Tomis
4	Boyan Yordanov	12 March 1983	197 cm (6 ft 6 in)	86 kg (190 lb)	358 cm (141 in)	335 cm (132 in)	Pallavolo Genova
5	Krasimir Gaydarski	23 February 1983	204 cm (6 ft 8 in)	96 kg (212 lb)	350 cm (140 in)	330 cm (130 in)	SCC Berlin
6	Matey Kaziyski	23 September 1984	203 cm (6 ft 8 in)	93 kg (205 lb)	370 cm (150 in)	335 cm (132 in)	Al-Rayyan Sports Club
7	Nikolay Nikolov	29 July 1986	206 cm (6 ft 9 in)	97 kg (214 lb)	350 cm (140 in)	332 cm (131 in)	Shahrdari Urmia
8	Ivan Stanev	7 July 1985	190 cm (6 ft 3 in)	86 kg (190 lb)	335 cm (132 in)	325 cm (128 in)	Neftohimik
9	Metodi Ananiev	17 February 1986	203 cm (6 ft 8 in)	100 kg (220 lb)	363 cm (143 in)	345 cm (136 in)	Indykpol AZS UWM
10	Danail Milushev	3 February 1984	200 cm (6 ft 7 in)	102 kg (225 lb)	360 cm (140 in)	340 cm (130 in)	F.C.Tokyo
11	Vladimir Nikolov	3 October 1977	200 cm (6 ft 7 in)	95 kg (209 lb)	345 cm (136 in)	325 cm (128 in)	ASU Lyon
12	Teodor Bogdanov	29 January 1986	207 cm (6 ft 9 in)	90 kg (200 lb)	360 cm (140 in)	340 cm (130 in)	Levski Siconco
13	Teodor Salparov	16 August 1982	187 cm (6 ft 2 in)	77 kg (170 lb)	320 cm (130 in)	305 cm (120 in)	Zenit
14	Kostadin Stoykov	7 December 1977	199 cm (6 ft 6 in)	85 kg (187 lb)	349 cm (137 in)	329 cm (130 in)	VC Nova
15	Todor Aleksiev	21 April 1983	204 cm (6 ft 8 in)	105 kg (231 lb)	355 cm (140 in)	340 cm (130 in)	Gazprom - Ugra Surgut
16	Martin Penev	29 February 1984	194 cm (6 ft 4 in)	95 kg (209 lb)	338 cm (133 in)	315 cm (124 in)	Lokomotiv - Izumrud
17	Plamen Konstantinov	14 June 1973	202 cm (6 ft 8 in)	93 kg (205 lb)	350 cm (140 in)	330 cm (130 in)	Iraklis Thessaloniki
18	Ivan Zarev	25 June 1986	199 cm (6 ft 6 in)	87 kg (192 lb)	341 cm (134 in)	328 cm (129 in)	CSKA
19	Tsvetan Sokolov	31 December 1989	205 cm (6 ft 9 in)	100 kg (220 lb)	337 cm (133 in)	319 cm (126 in)	Marek Union Ivkoni

== China ==
The following is the roster in the 2008 FIVB Volleyball World League.

No.	Name	Date of birth	Height	Weight	Spike	Block	2008 club
1	Bian Hongmin	22 September 1989	210 cm (6 ft 11 in)	95 kg (209 lb)	355 cm (140 in)	330 cm (130 in)	Zhejiang
2	Ji Zhe	25 October 1986	200 cm (6 ft 7 in)	90 kg (200 lb)	347 cm (137 in)	341 cm (134 in)	Henan
3	Ma Ming	5 April 1983	205 cm (6 ft 9 in)	90 kg (200 lb)	350 cm (140 in)	345 cm (136 in)	Liaoning
4	Yuan Zhi	29 September 1981	194 cm (6 ft 4 in)	95 kg (209 lb)	348 cm (137 in)	334 cm (131 in)	Liaoning
5	Guo Peng	1 July 1982	200 cm (6 ft 7 in)	84 kg (185 lb)	360 cm (140 in)	337 cm (133 in)	Army
6	Shi Hairong	27 March 1977	192 cm (6 ft 4 in)	80 kg (180 lb)	350 cm (140 in)	335 cm (132 in)	Jiangsu
7	Zhong Weijun	20 April 1989	200 cm (6 ft 7 in)	88 kg (194 lb)	347 cm (137 in)	335 cm (132 in)	Army
8	Cui Jianjun	1 August 1985	192 cm (6 ft 4 in)	94 kg (207 lb)	350 cm (140 in)	335 cm (132 in)	Henan
9	Jiao Shuai	28 January 1984	194 cm (6 ft 4 in)	75 kg (165 lb)	350 cm (140 in)	341 cm (134 in)	Henan
10	Li Chun	1 April 1982	190 cm (6 ft 3 in)	82 kg (181 lb)	348 cm (137 in)	332 cm (131 in)	Army
11	Yu Dawei	21 June 1984	199 cm (6 ft 6 in)	90 kg (200 lb)	345 cm (136 in)	335 cm (132 in)	Shandong
12	Shen Qiong	5 September 1981	198 cm (6 ft 6 in)	84 kg (185 lb)	359 cm (141 in)	349 cm (137 in)	Shanghai
13	Jiang Kun	3 December 1985	197 cm (6 ft 6 in)	90 kg (200 lb)	340 cm (130 in)	330 cm (130 in)	Sichuan
14	Jiang Fudong	10 January 1983	197 cm (6 ft 6 in)	85 kg (187 lb)	345 cm (136 in)	336 cm (132 in)	Sichuan
15	Yang Yaning	16 June 1984	183 cm (6 ft 0 in)	73 kg (161 lb)	336 cm (132 in)	326 cm (128 in)	Shandong
16	Ren Qi	24 February 1984	174 cm (5 ft 9 in)	70 kg (150 lb)	322 cm (127 in)	312 cm (123 in)	Shanghai
17	Sui Shengsheng	30 May 1980	192 cm (6 ft 4 in)	75 kg (165 lb)	345 cm (136 in)	334 cm (131 in)	Liaoning
18	Fang Yingchao	3 August 1982	198 cm (6 ft 6 in)	79 kg (174 lb)	360 cm (140 in)	350 cm (140 in)	Shanghai
19	Xie Wenhao	16 July 1983	202 cm (6 ft 8 in)	80 kg (180 lb)	348 cm (137 in)	330 cm (130 in)	Army

== Cuba ==
The following is the roster in the 2008 FIVB Volleyball World League.

No.	Name	Date of birth	Height	Weight	Spike	Block	2008 club
1	Wilfredo Leon Venero	31 July 1993	202 cm (6 ft 8 in)	96 kg (212 lb)	350 cm (140 in)	346 cm (136 in)	Santiago de Cuba
2	Lian Sem Estrada Jova	12 December 1982	196 cm (6 ft 5 in)	83 kg (183 lb)	339 cm (133 in)	335 cm (132 in)	Santiago de Cuba
3	Gustavo Leyva Alvarez	14 December 1985	180 cm (5 ft 11 in)	75 kg (165 lb)	305 cm (120 in)	300 cm (120 in)	Ciudad Habana
4	Yoandy Leal Hidalgo	31 August 1988	201 cm (6 ft 7 in)	84 kg (185 lb)	361 cm (142 in)	348 cm (137 in)	Sada Cruzeiro Volei
5	Miguel Angel Dalmau	21 September 1984	197 cm (6 ft 6 in)	83 kg (183 lb)	353 cm (139 in)	330 cm (130 in)	Villa Clara
6	Keibel Gutierrez Torna	6 May 1987	178 cm (5 ft 10 in)	80 kg (180 lb)	305 cm (120 in)	295 cm (116 in)	Villa Clara
7	Osmany Roberto Camejo Durruthy	18 February 1983	202 cm (6 ft 8 in)	90 kg (200 lb)	350 cm (140 in)	330 cm (130 in)	Ciudad Habana
8	Rodriguez Pedro Ruiz	13 November 1985	200 cm (6 ft 7 in)	84 kg (185 lb)	350 cm (140 in)	335 cm (132 in)	Villa Clara
9	Rolando Cepeda Abreu	13 March 1989	198 cm (6 ft 6 in)	77 kg (170 lb)	359 cm (141 in)	344 cm (135 in)	S.Spiritus
10	Rolando Jurquin Despaigne	7 June 1987	201 cm (6 ft 7 in)	95 kg (209 lb)	341 cm (134 in)	328 cm (129 in)	Santiago De Cuba
11	Yadier Sanchez Sierra	8 January 1987	200 cm (6 ft 7 in)	83 kg (183 lb)	335 cm (132 in)	335 cm (132 in)	Sada Cruzeiro Volei
12	Yenry Bell Cisnero	27 July 1981	188 cm (6 ft 2 in)	84 kg (185 lb)	358 cm (141 in)	328 cm (129 in)	Santiago de Cuba
13	Robertlandy Simón Aties	11 June 1987	206 cm (6 ft 9 in)	91 kg (201 lb)	358 cm (141 in)	326 cm (128 in)	Al-Rayyan Sports Club
14	Raydel Hierrezuelo Aguirre	14 July 1987	196 cm (6 ft 5 in)	87 kg (192 lb)	340 cm (130 in)	335 cm (132 in)	Ciudad Habana
15	Oreol Camejo Durruthy	22 July 1986	207 cm (6 ft 9 in)	94 kg (207 lb)	354 cm (139 in)	326 cm (128 in)	LOKOMOTIV NOVOSIBIRSK
16	Raydel Corrales Pouto	15 February 1982	201 cm (6 ft 7 in)	94 kg (207 lb)	355 cm (140 in)	325 cm (128 in)	Cienfuegos
17	Odelvis Dominico Speck	6 May 1977	205 cm (6 ft 9 in)	87 kg (192 lb)	360 cm (140 in)	356 cm (140 in)	Ciudad Habana
18	Darien Ferrer Delis	31 October 1983	204 cm (6 ft 8 in)	84 kg (185 lb)	362 cm (143 in)	346 cm (136 in)	Santiago de Cuba
19	Fernandez Pedro Lopez	10 October 1986	198 cm (6 ft 6 in)	84 kg (185 lb)	340 cm (130 in)	325 cm (128 in)	Santi Spiritu

== Egypt ==
The following is the roster in the 2008 FIVB Volleyball World League.

No.	Name	Date of birth	Height	Weight	Spike	Block	2008 club
1	Hamdy Awad	14 April 1972	202 cm (6 ft 8 in)	105 kg (231 lb)	346 cm (136 in)	327 cm (129 in)	AHLY
2	Abdallah Bekhit	10 October 1983	198 cm (6 ft 6 in)	72 kg (159 lb)	352 cm (139 in)	331 cm (130 in)	AHLY
3	Mohamed Gabal	21 January 1984	195 cm (6 ft 5 in)	97 kg (214 lb)	345 cm (136 in)	320 cm (130 in)	El Gaish
4	Ahmed Abdelhay	19 August 1984	197 cm (6 ft 6 in)	87 kg (192 lb)	342 cm (135 in)	316 cm (124 in)	ARMY CLUB
5	Abdellatif Ahmed	13 August 1983	202 cm (6 ft 8 in)	90 kg (200 lb)	345 cm (136 in)	325 cm (128 in)	ZAMALEK
6	Wael Alaydy	8 December 1971	178 cm (5 ft 10 in)	78 kg (172 lb)	320 cm (130 in)	300 cm (120 in)	ZAMALEK
7	Ashraf Abouelhassan	17 May 1975	186 cm (6 ft 1 in)	86 kg (190 lb)	325 cm (128 in)	318 cm (125 in)	ZAMALEK
8	Saleh Youssef	25 July 1982	194 cm (6 ft 4 in)	91 kg (201 lb)	345 cm (136 in)	332 cm (131 in)	Zamalek
9	Mohamed El Mahdy	2 September 1978	196 cm (6 ft 5 in)	96 kg (212 lb)	340 cm (130 in)	335 cm (132 in)	AHLY
10	Ahmed Afifi	30 March 1988	194 cm (6 ft 4 in)	92 kg (203 lb)	347 cm (137 in)	342 cm (135 in)	ZAMALEK
11	Mohamed Elnafrawy	9 June 1983	200 cm (6 ft 7 in)	92 kg (203 lb)	335 cm (132 in)	320 cm (130 in)	AHLY
12	Mahmoud Ismail (javelin)	7 April 1986	193 cm (6 ft 4 in)	89 kg (196 lb)	348 cm (137 in)	341 cm (134 in)	ZAMALEK
13	Mohamed Badawy	11 January 1986	197 cm (6 ft 6 in)	97 kg (214 lb)	351 cm (138 in)	343 cm (135 in)	ZAMALEK
14	Hossameldin Gomaa	15 February 1984	199 cm (6 ft 6 in)	92 kg (203 lb)	344 cm (135 in)	324 cm (128 in)	AHLY
15	Ahmed Abdel Fattah	14 June 1986	198 cm (6 ft 6 in)	95 kg (209 lb)	335 cm (132 in)	325 cm (128 in)	POLICE UNION
16	Mohamed Seif Elnasr	5 September 1983	202 cm (6 ft 8 in)	89 kg (196 lb)	345 cm (136 in)	339 cm (133 in)	ZAMALEK
17	Mahmoud Abd El kader	12 May 1985	195 cm (6 ft 5 in)	94 kg (207 lb)	342 cm (135 in)	316 cm (124 in)	AHLY
18	Mohamed El Daabousi	1 March 1987	202 cm (6 ft 8 in)	107 kg (236 lb)	348 cm (137 in)	342 cm (135 in)	ZAMALEK
19	Mohamed Moawad	26 August 1987	194 cm (6 ft 4 in)	90 kg (200 lb)	321 cm (126 in)	310 cm (120 in)	AHLY

== Finland ==
The following is the roster in the 2008 FIVB Volleyball World League.

No.	Name	Date of birth	Height	Weight	Spike	Block	2008 club
1	Jarmo Kaaretkoski	12 December 1982	186 cm (6 ft 1 in)	80 kg (180 lb)	316 cm (124 in)	294 cm (116 in)	Santasport (FIN)
2	Joni Markkula	10 February 1983	192 cm (6 ft 4 in)	84 kg (185 lb)	330 cm (130 in)	311 cm (122 in)	Vammalan Lentopallo (FIN)
3	Mikko Esko	3 September 1978	198 cm (6 ft 6 in)	89 kg (196 lb)	331 cm (130 in)	319 cm (126 in)	Nizhni Novgorod (RUS)
4	Olli-Pekka Ojansivu	31 December 1987	197 cm (6 ft 6 in)	90 kg (200 lb)	344 cm (135 in)	325 cm (128 in)	Kokkolan Tiikerit (FIN)
5	Antti Siltala	14 March 1984	193 cm (6 ft 4 in)	90 kg (200 lb)	348 cm (137 in)	330 cm (130 in)	Jenisei Krasnojarsk (RUS)
6	Henri Rajala	26 September 1988	191 cm (6 ft 3 in)	81 kg (179 lb)	340 cm (130 in)	318 cm (125 in)	Raision Loimu (FIN)
7	Matti Hietanen	3 January 1983	199 cm (6 ft 6 in)	93 kg (205 lb)	350 cm (140 in)	320 cm (130 in)	Gdansk (POL)
8	Simo-Pekka Olli	13 November 1985	204 cm (6 ft 8 in)	100 kg (220 lb)	343 cm (135 in)	330 cm (130 in)	Raision Loimu (FIN)
9	Kalle Määttä	4 October 1984	191 cm (6 ft 3 in)	78 kg (172 lb)	328 cm (129 in)	310 cm (120 in)	Team Lakkapää (FIN)
10	Toni Kankaanpää	18 March 1984	194 cm (6 ft 4 in)	89 kg (196 lb)	345 cm (136 in)	318 cm (125 in)	Korson Veto (FIN)
11	Henri Tuomi	14 December 1982	196 cm (6 ft 5 in)	93 kg (205 lb)	345 cm (136 in)	320 cm (130 in)	Raision Loimu (FIN)
12	Olli Kunnari	2 February 1982	197 cm (6 ft 6 in)	85 kg (187 lb)	342 cm (135 in)	315 cm (124 in)	Vammalan Lentopallo (FIN)
13	Mikko Oivanen	26 May 1986	198 cm (6 ft 6 in)	92 kg (203 lb)	360 cm (140 in)	320 cm (130 in)	Czarni Radom (POL)
14	Konstantin Shumov	15 February 1985	205 cm (6 ft 9 in)	98 kg (216 lb)	351 cm (138 in)	331 cm (130 in)	Treia (ITA)
15	Matti Oivanen	26 May 1986	198 cm (6 ft 6 in)	90 kg (200 lb)	355 cm (140 in)	320 cm (130 in)	Hurrikaani-Loimaa (FIN)
16	Urpo Sivula	15 March 1988	195 cm (6 ft 5 in)	100 kg (220 lb)	350 cm (140 in)	330 cm (130 in)	Raision Loimu (FIN)
17	Tuukka Anttila	13 January 1980	204 cm (6 ft 8 in)	95 kg (209 lb)	355 cm (140 in)	335 cm (132 in)	Salon Piivolley (FIN)
18	Jukka Lehtonen	22 February 1982	197 cm (6 ft 6 in)	90 kg (200 lb)	346 cm (136 in)	325 cm (128 in)	LEKA Volley (FIN)
19	Pasi Hyvärinen	22 November 1987	184 cm (6 ft 0 in)	80 kg (180 lb)	320 cm (130 in)	300 cm (120 in)	KyKy-Betset (FIN)

== France ==
The following is the roster in the 2008 FIVB Volleyball World League.

No.	Name	Date of birth	Height	Weight	Spike	Block	2008 club
1	Yannick Bazin	18 June 1983	190 cm (6 ft 3 in)	95 kg (209 lb)	337 cm (133 in)	315 cm (124 in)	Galatazarai
2	Bojidar Slavev	30 June 1984	203 cm (6 ft 8 in)	95 kg (209 lb)	348 cm (137 in)	325 cm (128 in)	Toulouse
3	Gérald Hardy-Dessources	9 February 1983	197 cm (6 ft 6 in)	93 kg (205 lb)	360 cm (140 in)	335 cm (132 in)	Tours VB
4	Antonin Rouzier	18 August 1986	201 cm (6 ft 7 in)	100 kg (220 lb)	350 cm (140 in)	330 cm (130 in)	Ankara
5	Romain Vadeleux	12 February 1983	196 cm (6 ft 5 in)	100 kg (220 lb)	355 cm (140 in)	335 cm (132 in)	Lube Macerata
6	Jean-Philippe Sol	1 January 1986	198 cm (6 ft 6 in)	92 kg (203 lb)	345 cm (136 in)	325 cm (128 in)	Arago de Sète
7	Stéphane Antiga	3 February 1976	200 cm (6 ft 7 in)	94 kg (207 lb)	347 cm (137 in)	327 cm (129 in)	PGE Skra
8	Marien Moreau	25 October 1983	201 cm (6 ft 7 in)	100 kg (220 lb)	345 cm (136 in)	328 cm (129 in)	Munich
9	Guillaume Samica	28 September 1981	198 cm (6 ft 6 in)	88 kg (194 lb)	355 cm (140 in)	327 cm (129 in)	Zaksa
10	Jean-Stéphane Tolar	4 July 1984	199 cm (6 ft 6 in)	90 kg (200 lb)	330 cm (130 in)	309 cm (122 in)	Tourcoing VLM
11	Loïc Le Marrec	1 March 1977	190 cm (6 ft 3 in)	82 kg (181 lb)	330 cm (130 in)	312 cm (123 in)	Tours VB
12	Nicolas Marechal	4 March 1987	198 cm (6 ft 6 in)	93 kg (205 lb)	338 cm (133 in)	327 cm (129 in)	Skra Belchatov
13	Pierre Pujol	13 July 1984	186 cm (6 ft 1 in)	90 kg (200 lb)	335 cm (132 in)	315 cm (124 in)	AS Cannes
14	Loic Geiler	14 April 1984	198 cm (6 ft 6 in)	85 kg (187 lb)	352 cm (139 in)	328 cm (129 in)	AS Cannes
15	Samuele Tuia	24 July 1986	195 cm (6 ft 5 in)	95 kg (209 lb)	345 cm (136 in)	325 cm (128 in)	Skra Belchatov
16	Emmanuel Ragondet	6 August 1987	191 cm (6 ft 3 in)	77 kg (170 lb)	338 cm (133 in)	320 cm (130 in)	Arago de Sète
17	Gary Gendrey	30 November 1985	198 cm (6 ft 6 in)	85 kg (187 lb)	353 cm (139 in)	327 cm (129 in)	Tourcoing LVM
18	Jean-François Exiga	9 March 1982	176 cm (5 ft 9 in)	75 kg (165 lb)	320 cm (130 in)	312 cm (123 in)	Tours VB
19	Edouard Rowlandson	20 July 1988	190 cm (6 ft 3 in)	89 kg (196 lb)	330 cm (130 in)	310 cm (120 in)	Arago de Sète

== Italy ==
The following is the roster in the 2008 FIVB Volleyball World League.

No.	Name	Date of birth	Height	Weight	Spike	Block	2008 club
1	Luigi Mastrangelo	17 August 1975	202 cm (6 ft 8 in)	90 kg (200 lb)	368 cm (145 in)	336 cm (132 in)	Bre banca Lannuti Cuneo
2	Dore Della Lunga	25 July 1984	190 cm (6 ft 3 in)	83 kg (183 lb)	350 cm (140 in)	325 cm (128 in)	Trentino Diatec
3	Mauro Gavotto	16 April 1979	201 cm (6 ft 7 in)	88 kg (194 lb)	350 cm (140 in)	330 cm (130 in)	Acqua Paradiso
4	Loris Manià	27 January 1979	190 cm (6 ft 3 in)	76 kg (168 lb)	330 cm (130 in)	315 cm (124 in)	Modena Volley
5	Valerio Vermiglio	1 March 1976	193 cm (6 ft 4 in)	85 kg (187 lb)	342 cm (135 in)	320 cm (130 in)	ZENIT Kazan
6	Marco Meoni	25 May 1973	197 cm (6 ft 6 in)	86 kg (190 lb)	338 cm (133 in)	313 cm (123 in)	Copra Nordmeccanica
7	Alessandro Paparoni	17 August 1981	191 cm (6 ft 3 in)	75 kg (165 lb)	340 cm (130 in)	314 cm (124 in)	Lube Banca Marche
8	Alberto Cisolla	10 October 1977	197 cm (6 ft 6 in)	86 kg (190 lb)	367 cm (144 in)	345 cm (136 in)	Trenkwalder
9	Matteo Martino	28 January 1987	197 cm (6 ft 6 in)	84 kg (185 lb)	340 cm (130 in)	322 cm (127 in)	Lube Banca Marche
10	Luca Tencati	16 March 1979	200 cm (6 ft 7 in)	97 kg (214 lb)	350 cm (140 in)	330 cm (130 in)	Cimone
11	Hristo Zlatanov	21 April 1976	204 cm (6 ft 8 in)	103 kg (227 lb)	355 cm (140 in)	315 cm (124 in)	Copra Nordmeccanica
12	Mirko Corsano	28 October 1973	190 cm (6 ft 3 in)	87 kg (192 lb)	342 cm (135 in)	303 cm (119 in)	Lube Banca Marche
13	Lorenzo Perazzolo	30 October 1984	195 cm (6 ft 5 in)	92 kg (203 lb)	349 cm (137 in)	321 cm (126 in)	Pallavolo Padova
14	Alessandro Fei	29 November 1978	204 cm (6 ft 8 in)	90 kg (200 lb)	358 cm (141 in)	336 cm (132 in)	Copra Elior Piacenza
15	Emanuele Birarelli	8 February 1981	202 cm (6 ft 8 in)	95 kg (209 lb)	340 cm (130 in)	316 cm (124 in)	Sir Safety Umbria Volley
16	Vigor Bovolenta	30 May 1974	202 cm (6 ft 8 in)	95 kg (209 lb)	362 cm (143 in)	327 cm (129 in)	Copra Nordmeccanica
17	Andrea Sala	27 December 1978	202 cm (6 ft 8 in)	96 kg (212 lb)	359 cm (141 in)	340 cm (130 in)	Trentino Betclic
18	Cristian Casoli	27 January 1975	192 cm (6 ft 4 in)	85 kg (187 lb)	345 cm (136 in)	315 cm (124 in)	Trentino Volley
19	Dragan Travica	28 August 1986	197 cm (6 ft 6 in)	90 kg (200 lb)	325 cm (128 in)	310 cm (120 in)	Acqua Paradiso

== Japan ==
The following is the roster in the 2008 FIVB Volleyball World League.

No.	Name	Date of birth	Height	Weight	Spike	Block	2008 club
1	Hisashi Aizawa	8 March 1986	195 cm (6 ft 5 in)	86 kg (190 lb)	353 cm (139 in)	335 cm (132 in)	Toray Arrows
2	Yuichiro Sakamoto	27 August 1975	195 cm (6 ft 5 in)	88 kg (194 lb)	343 cm (135 in)	333 cm (131 in)	Suntory Sunbirds
3	Takeshi Kitajima	16 December 1982	195 cm (6 ft 5 in)	85 kg (187 lb)	346 cm (136 in)	330 cm (130 in)	Sakai Blazers
4	Kyohei Shibata	24 June 1981	190 cm (6 ft 3 in)	84 kg (185 lb)	355 cm (140 in)	325 cm (128 in)	Toray Arrows
5	Daisuke Usami	29 March 1979	184 cm (6 ft 0 in)	88 kg (194 lb)	320 cm (130 in)	310 cm (120 in)	Panasonic Panthers
6	Masayuki Iwata	30 January 1982	179 cm (5 ft 10 in)	66 kg (146 lb)	315 cm (124 in)	300 cm (120 in)	Panasonic Panthers
7	Takahiro Yamamoto	12 July 1978	201 cm (6 ft 7 in)	98 kg (216 lb)	345 cm (136 in)	335 cm (132 in)	Panasonic Panthers
8	Masaji Ogino	8 January 1970	197 cm (6 ft 6 in)	98 kg (216 lb)	340 cm (130 in)	320 cm (130 in)	Suntory Sunbirds
9	Takaaki Tomimatsu	20 July 1984	192 cm (6 ft 4 in)	85 kg (187 lb)	350 cm (140 in)	330 cm (130 in)	Toray Arrows
10	Ko Tanimura	15 August 1982	194 cm (6 ft 4 in)	81 kg (179 lb)	340 cm (130 in)	330 cm (130 in)	Panasonic Panthers
11	Yoshihiko Matsumoto	7 January 1981	193 cm (6 ft 4 in)	80 kg (180 lb)	340 cm (130 in)	330 cm (130 in)	Sakai Blazers
12	Kota Yamamura	20 October 1980	205 cm (6 ft 9 in)	95 kg (209 lb)	350 cm (140 in)	335 cm (132 in)	Suntory Sunbirds
13	Kunihiro Shimizu	11 August 1986	192 cm (6 ft 4 in)	97 kg (214 lb)	345 cm (136 in)	335 cm (132 in)	Panasonic Panthers
14	Tatsuya Fukuzawa	1 July 1986	189 cm (6 ft 2 in)	86 kg (190 lb)	355 cm (140 in)	345 cm (136 in)	Panasonic Panthers
15	Katsutoshi Tsumagari	2 November 1975	183 cm (6 ft 0 in)	78 kg (172 lb)	320 cm (130 in)	305 cm (120 in)	Suntory Sunbirds
16	Yusuke Ishijima	9 January 1984	197 cm (6 ft 6 in)	102 kg (225 lb)	345 cm (136 in)	335 cm (132 in)	Sakai Blazers
17	Yu Koshikawa	30 June 1984	189 cm (6 ft 2 in)	87 kg (192 lb)	340 cm (130 in)	320 cm (130 in)	JT Thunders
18	Kosuke Tomonaga	22 July 1980	184 cm (6 ft 0 in)	83 kg (183 lb)	320 cm (130 in)	310 cm (120 in)	Sakai Blazers
19	Daisuke Sakai	22 October 1981	180 cm (5 ft 11 in)	75 kg (165 lb)	320 cm (130 in)	305 cm (120 in)	Japan Volleyball Association

== South Korea ==
The following is the roster in the 2008 FIVB Volleyball World League.

No.	Name	Date of birth	Height	Weight	Spike	Block	2008 club
1	Chang Kwang-Kyun	14 March 1981	190 cm (6 ft 3 in)	82 kg (181 lb)	321 cm (126 in)	312 cm (123 in)	Korean Airlines Co.
2	Park Sang-Ha	4 April 1986	198 cm (6 ft 6 in)	89 kg (196 lb)	327 cm (129 in)	315 cm (124 in)	Korean Army
3	Kwon Young-Min	5 July 1980	190 cm (6 ft 3 in)	82 kg (181 lb)	315 cm (124 in)	309 cm (122 in)	Hyundai Capital Co.
4	Moon Sung-Min	14 September 1986	198 cm (6 ft 6 in)	89 kg (196 lb)	329 cm (130 in)	321 cm (126 in)	Hyundai Capital Co.
5	Yeo Oh-Hyun	2 September 1978	175 cm (5 ft 9 in)	70 kg (150 lb)	280 cm (110 in)	279 cm (110 in)	Hyundai Capital
6	Choi Tae-Woong	9 April 1976	185 cm (6 ft 1 in)	80 kg (180 lb)	315 cm (124 in)	302 cm (119 in)	Hyundai Capital
7	Lee Sun-Kyu	14 March 1981	199 cm (6 ft 6 in)	90 kg (200 lb)	325 cm (128 in)	320 cm (130 in)	Samsung Fire & Marine Insurance
8	Ha Hyun-Yong	9 May 1982	198 cm (6 ft 6 in)	88 kg (194 lb)	330 cm (130 in)	322 cm (127 in)	LIG Insurance
9	Shin Young-Soo	1 July 1982	197 cm (6 ft 6 in)	90 kg (200 lb)	335 cm (132 in)	313 cm (123 in)	Korean Airlines co.
10	Yun Bong-Woo	20 January 1982	199 cm (6 ft 6 in)	88 kg (194 lb)	332 cm (131 in)	320 cm (130 in)	Hyundai Capital co.
11	Lee Kyung-Soo	27 April 1979	198 cm (6 ft 6 in)	90 kg (200 lb)	332 cm (131 in)	315 cm (124 in)	LIG Insurance
12	Park Jun-Bum	12 June 1988	198 cm (6 ft 6 in)	90 kg (200 lb)	332 cm (131 in)	318 cm (125 in)	KEPCO 45
13	Ko Hee-Jin	13 July 1980	198 cm (6 ft 6 in)	91 kg (201 lb)	330 cm (130 in)	320 cm (130 in)	Samsung Fire&Marine Insurance
14	Kim Yo-han	16 August 1985	200 cm (6 ft 7 in)	95 kg (209 lb)	335 cm (132 in)	326 cm (128 in)	LIG Insurance
15	Joo Sang-Yong	10 June 1982	197 cm (6 ft 6 in)	87 kg (192 lb)	325 cm (128 in)	314 cm (124 in)	Hyundai Capital Co.
16	Song Byung-Il	3 April 1983	196 cm (6 ft 5 in)	85 kg (187 lb)	317 cm (125 in)	297 cm (117 in)	Woori Capital
17	Ha Kyoung-Min	27 July 1982	201 cm (6 ft 7 in)	83 kg (183 lb)	320 cm (130 in)	310 cm (120 in)	Kepco 45
18	Shin Yung-Suk	4 October 1986	198 cm (6 ft 6 in)	90 kg (200 lb)	335 cm (132 in)	325 cm (128 in)	Korean Army
19	Choi Bu-Sik	12 July 1978	180 cm (5 ft 11 in)	80 kg (180 lb)	290 cm (110 in)	281 cm (111 in)	Korean Airlines Co.

== Poland ==
The following is the roster in the 2008 FIVB Volleyball World League.

No.	Name	Date of birth	Height	Weight	Spike	Block	2008 club
1	Piotr Nowakowski	18 December 1987	205 cm (6 ft 9 in)	90 kg (200 lb)	355 cm (140 in)	340 cm (130 in)	Asseco Resovia
2	Michal Winiarski	28 September 1983	200 cm (6 ft 7 in)	82 kg (181 lb)	345 cm (136 in)	332 cm (131 in)	Fakiel Novy Urengoy
3	Piotr Gruszka	8 March 1977	206 cm (6 ft 9 in)	102 kg (225 lb)	355 cm (140 in)	330 cm (130 in)	GS RoburAngelo Costa
4	Daniel Plinski	10 December 1978	204 cm (6 ft 8 in)	100 kg (220 lb)	345 cm (136 in)	325 cm (128 in)	PGE Skra
5	Pawel Zagumny	18 October 1977	200 cm (6 ft 7 in)	88 kg (194 lb)	336 cm (132 in)	317 cm (125 in)	ZAKSA
6	Bartosz Kurek	29 August 1988	205 cm (6 ft 9 in)	87 kg (192 lb)	352 cm (139 in)	326 cm (128 in)	Lube Banca Marche
7	Wojciech Grzyb	4 January 1981	205 cm (6 ft 9 in)	104 kg (229 lb)	360 cm (140 in)	340 cm (130 in)	LOTOS Trefl
8	Marcin Wika	9 November 1983	194 cm (6 ft 4 in)	86 kg (190 lb)	335 cm (132 in)	310 cm (120 in)	Asseco Resovia
9	Lukasz Zygadlo	2 August 1979	200 cm (6 ft 7 in)	89 kg (196 lb)	337 cm (133 in)	325 cm (128 in)	Zienit Kazan
10	Mariusz Wlazly	4 August 1983	194 cm (6 ft 4 in)	80 kg (180 lb)	360 cm (140 in)	329 cm (130 in)	PGE Skra
11	Lukasz Kadziewicz	20 September 1980	206 cm (6 ft 9 in)	84 kg (185 lb)	360 cm (140 in)	335 cm (132 in)	Al-Arabi
12	Pawel Woicki	29 June 1983	183 cm (6 ft 0 in)	80 kg (180 lb)	330 cm (130 in)	305 cm (120 in)	Transfer Bydgoszcz
13	Sebastian Swiderski	26 June 1977	193 cm (6 ft 4 in)	88 kg (194 lb)	354 cm (139 in)	325 cm (128 in)	ZAKSA
14	Krzysztof Gierczynski	23 January 1976	193 cm (6 ft 4 in)	81 kg (179 lb)	337 cm (133 in)	324 cm (128 in)	Asseco Resovia
15	Piotr Gacek	16 September 1978	185 cm (6 ft 1 in)	78 kg (172 lb)	325 cm (128 in)	305 cm (120 in)	LOTOS Trefl
16	Krzysztof Ignaczak	15 May 1978	188 cm (6 ft 2 in)	86 kg (190 lb)	330 cm (130 in)	315 cm (124 in)	Asseco Resovia
17	Michal Bakiewicz	22 March 1981	197 cm (6 ft 6 in)	92 kg (203 lb)	339 cm (133 in)	318 cm (125 in)	PGE Skra
18	Marcin Mozdzonek	9 February 1985	211 cm (6 ft 11 in)	93 kg (205 lb)	358 cm (141 in)	338 cm (133 in)	Halkbank
19	Zbigniew Bartman	4 May 1987	198 cm (6 ft 6 in)	95 kg (209 lb)	352 cm (139 in)	320 cm (130 in)	Asseco Resovia

== Russia ==
The following is the roster in the 2008 FIVB Volleyball World League.

No.	Name	Date of birth	Height	Weight	Spike	Block	2008 club
1	Alexander Korneev	11 September 1980	200 cm (6 ft 7 in)	96 kg (212 lb)	348 cm (137 in)	339 cm (133 in)	Dinamo Moscow
2	Semen Poltavskiy	8 February 1981	205 cm (6 ft 9 in)	89 kg (196 lb)	360 cm (140 in)	338 cm (133 in)	Yaroslavich Yaroslavl
3	Alexander Kosarev	30 September 1977	203 cm (6 ft 8 in)	95 kg (209 lb)	339 cm (133 in)	328 cm (129 in)	Belogorie
4	Pavel Kruglov	17 September 1985	205 cm (6 ft 9 in)	98 kg (216 lb)	351 cm (138 in)	342 cm (135 in)	Dinamo
5	Pavel Abramov	23 April 1979	200 cm (6 ft 7 in)	87 kg (192 lb)	347 cm (137 in)	336 cm (132 in)	Iskra
6	Sergey Grankin	21 January 1985	195 cm (6 ft 5 in)	96 kg (212 lb)	351 cm (138 in)	320 cm (130 in)	Dinamo
7	Alexey Cheremisin	23 September 1980	202 cm (6 ft 8 in)	98 kg (216 lb)	350 cm (140 in)	338 cm (133 in)	ZENIT Kazan
8	Sergey Tetyukhin	23 September 1975	197 cm (6 ft 6 in)	89 kg (196 lb)	345 cm (136 in)	338 cm (133 in)	Belogorie
9	Vadim Khamuttskikh	26 November 1969	196 cm (6 ft 5 in)	85 kg (187 lb)	342 cm (135 in)	331 cm (130 in)	Fakel Novy Urengoy
10	Yury Berezhko	27 January 1984	196 cm (6 ft 5 in)	93 kg (205 lb)	346 cm (136 in)	338 cm (133 in)	Dinamo
11	Oleg Samsonychev	22 March 1982	198 cm (6 ft 6 in)	96 kg (212 lb)	338 cm (133 in)	330 cm (130 in)	Iskra
12	Dmitry Krasikov	8 February 1987	202 cm (6 ft 8 in)	93 kg (205 lb)	349 cm (137 in)	330 cm (130 in)	Fakel
13	Alexey Ostapenko	26 May 1986	208 cm (6 ft 10 in)	94 kg (207 lb)	355 cm (140 in)	340 cm (130 in)	Gubernia
14	Andrey Egorchev	8 February 1978	206 cm (6 ft 9 in)	113 kg (249 lb)	353 cm (139 in)	342 cm (135 in)	Dinamo-TTG Kazan
15	Alexander Volkov	14 February 1985	210 cm (6 ft 11 in)	90 kg (200 lb)	360 cm (140 in)	335 cm (132 in)	ZENIT Kazan
16	Alexey Verbov	31 January 1982	183 cm (6 ft 0 in)	79 kg (174 lb)	315 cm (124 in)	310 cm (120 in)	ZENIT Kazan
17	Maxim Mikhaylov	19 March 1988	202 cm (6 ft 8 in)	103 kg (227 lb)	345 cm (136 in)	330 cm (130 in)	Zenit Kazan
18	Alexey Kuleshov	24 February 1979	206 cm (6 ft 9 in)	100 kg (220 lb)	353 cm (139 in)	344 cm (135 in)	Iskra
19	Alexander Yanutov	19 June 1983	195 cm (6 ft 5 in)	103 kg (227 lb)	335 cm (132 in)	315 cm (124 in)	Gazprom-Yugra

== Serbia ==
The following is the roster in the 2008 FIVB Volleyball World League.

No.	Name	Date of birth	Height	Weight	Spike	Block	2008 club
1	Nikola Kovacevic	14 February 1983	193 cm (6 ft 4 in)	78 kg (172 lb)	350 cm (140 in)	340 cm (130 in)	Calzedonia Verona (ITA)
2	Dejan Bojovic	3 April 1983	198 cm (6 ft 6 in)	96 kg (212 lb)	360 cm (140 in)	345 cm (136 in)	Toray Arrows (JPN)
4	Bojan Janic	11 March 1982	198 cm (6 ft 6 in)	83 kg (183 lb)	345 cm (136 in)	322 cm (127 in)	Trefl Pilka Siatkowa (POL)
5	Vlado Petkovic	6 January 1983	198 cm (6 ft 6 in)	97 kg (214 lb)	325 cm (128 in)	318 cm (125 in)	Shahrdari Urmia SC (IRN)
6	Konstantin Cupkovic	2 January 1987	202 cm (6 ft 8 in)	96 kg (212 lb)	365 cm (144 in)	340 cm (130 in)	PGE Skra
7	Dragan Stankovic	18 October 1985	205 cm (6 ft 9 in)	94 kg (207 lb)	343 cm (135 in)	333 cm (131 in)	Lube Banka Macerata (ITA)
8	Marko Samardzic	22 February 1983	190 cm (6 ft 3 in)	82 kg (181 lb)	326 cm (128 in)	310 cm (120 in)	Trefl Pilka Siatkowa (POL)
9	Nikola Grbic	6 September 1973	194 cm (6 ft 4 in)	91 kg (201 lb)	346 cm (136 in)	320 cm (130 in)	Itas Diatec Trentino (ITA)
10	Milos Nikic	31 March 1986	194 cm (6 ft 4 in)	79 kg (174 lb)	350 cm (140 in)	330 cm (130 in)	Gubernia Nizhniy Novgorod (RUS)
11	Mihajlo Mitic	17 September 1990	201 cm (6 ft 7 in)	86 kg (190 lb)	335 cm (132 in)	320 cm (130 in)	Sir Safety Perugia (ITA)
12	Andrija Geric	24 January 1977	203 cm (6 ft 8 in)	101 kg (223 lb)	350 cm (140 in)	323 cm (127 in)	Panathinaikos (GRE)
13	Tomislav Dokic	27 February 1986	204 cm (6 ft 8 in)	97 kg (214 lb)	355 cm (140 in)	325 cm (128 in)	Foinikas Syros V.C. (GRE)
14	Ivan Miljkovic	13 September 1979	206 cm (6 ft 9 in)	104 kg (229 lb)	354 cm (139 in)	333 cm (131 in)	Fenerbahce (TUR)
15	Sasa Starovic	19 October 1988	207 cm (6 ft 9 in)	89 kg (196 lb)	335 cm (132 in)	321 cm (126 in)	Andreoli Latina (ITA)
16	Nemanja Petric	28 July 1987	202 cm (6 ft 8 in)	86 kg (190 lb)	333 cm (131 in)	320 cm (130 in)	Sir Safety Perugia (ITA)
17	Dejan Radic	6 November 1984	200 cm (6 ft 7 in)	95 kg (209 lb)	360 cm (140 in)	340 cm (130 in)	Vojvodina NS Seme (SRB)
18	Marko Podrascanin	29 August 1987	203 cm (6 ft 8 in)	100 kg (220 lb)	343 cm (135 in)	326 cm (128 in)	Lube Banka Macerata (ITA)
19	Nikola Rosic	5 August 1984	192 cm (6 ft 4 in)	85 kg (187 lb)	328 cm (129 in)	315 cm (124 in)	Energy Investments Lugano (SUI)

== Spain ==
The following is the roster in the 2008 FIVB Volleyball World League.

No.	Name	Date of birth	Height	Weight	Spike	Block	2008 club
1	Guillermo Falasca Fernandez	24 October 1977	200 cm (6 ft 7 in)	107 kg (236 lb)	350 cm (140 in)	325 cm (128 in)	Ankara (TUR)
2	Ibán Perez Manzaneres	13 November 1983	198 cm (6 ft 6 in)	87 kg (192 lb)	350 cm (140 in)	325 cm (128 in)	CAI VB Teruel
3	Gustavo Delgado Escribano	21 January 1986	192 cm (6 ft 4 in)	89 kg (196 lb)	340 cm (130 in)	315 cm (124 in)	CV CAI Teruel (ESP)
4	Manuel Sevillano	2 July 1981	194 cm (6 ft 4 in)	92 kg (203 lb)	342 cm (135 in)	319 cm (126 in)	Saint Nazaire Atlantique (FRA)
5	Francisco José Rodríguez	25 September 1980	189 cm (6 ft 2 in)	88 kg (194 lb)	340 cm (130 in)	315 cm (124 in)	CAI Voleibol Teruel
6	Alfonso Flores	24 August 1975	189 cm (6 ft 2 in)	90 kg (200 lb)	340 cm (130 in)	330 cm (130 in)	Unicaja Arukasur Almería
7	Guillermo Hernán	25 July 1982	181 cm (5 ft 11 in)	68 kg (150 lb)	335 cm (132 in)	315 cm (124 in)	Paris Volley (FRA)
8	Alberto Salas	13 September 1984	194 cm (6 ft 4 in)	84 kg (185 lb)	353 cm (139 in)	325 cm (128 in)	CMA Numancia Soria
9	Alexis Valido	9 March 1976	185 cm (6 ft 1 in)	93 kg (205 lb)	0 cm (0 in)	0 cm (0 in)	Unicaja Almería
10	Miguel Angel Falasca Fernandez	29 April 1973	195 cm (6 ft 5 in)	92 kg (203 lb)	345 cm (136 in)	322 cm (127 in)	PGE Belchatow (POL)
11	Javier Subiela	22 March 1984	198 cm (6 ft 6 in)	89 kg (196 lb)	350 cm (140 in)	325 cm (128 in)	CAI VB Teruel
12	Daniel Ruíz	19 August 1981	194 cm (6 ft 4 in)	85 kg (187 lb)	325 cm (128 in)	315 cm (124 in)	Avignon
13	Juan Carlos Barcala	25 January 1984	201 cm (6 ft 7 in)	94 kg (207 lb)	348 cm (137 in)	325 cm (128 in)	CV CAI Teruel (ESP)
14	Jose Luis Moltó	29 June 1975	206 cm (6 ft 9 in)	98 kg (216 lb)	355 cm (140 in)	330 cm (130 in)	Taranto
15	Luis Pedro Suela	7 July 1976	195 cm (6 ft 5 in)	85 kg (187 lb)	343 cm (135 in)	320 cm (130 in)	Arkas Izmir
16	Julián García-Torres	8 November 1980	202 cm (6 ft 8 in)	91 kg (201 lb)	353 cm (139 in)	330 cm (130 in)	CAI VB Teruel
17	Enrique De La Fuente	11 August 1975	194 cm (6 ft 4 in)	94 kg (207 lb)	348 cm (137 in)	328 cm (129 in)	Drac Palma C.V. Portol
18	Israel Rodríguez Calderon	27 August 1981	194 cm (6 ft 4 in)	85 kg (187 lb)	343 cm (135 in)	325 cm (128 in)	Tomis Constanta (ROU)
19	Juan Contreras	25 August 1986	176 cm (5 ft 9 in)	70 kg (150 lb)	335 cm (132 in)	315 cm (124 in)	Universidad de Granada

== United States ==
The following is the roster in the 2008 FIVB Volleyball World League.

No.	Name	Date of birth	Height	Weight	Spike	Block	2008 club
1	Lloy Ball	17 February 1972	203 cm (6 ft 8 in)	95 kg (209 lb)	351 cm (138 in)	316 cm (124 in)	ZENIT Kazan
2	Sean Rooney	13 November 1982	206 cm (6 ft 9 in)	100 kg (220 lb)	354 cm (139 in)	336 cm (132 in)	Woori Card Hansae
3	Evan Patak	23 June 1984	201 cm (6 ft 7 in)	113 kg (249 lb)	363 cm (143 in)	330 cm (130 in)	Toulouse
4	David Lee	8 March 1982	203 cm (6 ft 8 in)	105 kg (231 lb)	350 cm (140 in)	325 cm (128 in)	Lokomotiv Nobosibirsk
5	Richard Lambourne	6 May 1975	190 cm (6 ft 3 in)	90 kg (200 lb)	324 cm (128 in)	312 cm (123 in)	USA Men's Volleyball Team
6	Phillip Eatherton	2 January 1974	206 cm (6 ft 9 in)	101 kg (223 lb)	356 cm (140 in)	335 cm (132 in)	AZS Czestochowa
7	Donald Suxho	21 February 1976	196 cm (6 ft 5 in)	98 kg (216 lb)	337 cm (133 in)	319 cm (126 in)	Trentino Volley
8	William Reid Priddy	1 October 1977	194 cm (6 ft 4 in)	89 kg (196 lb)	353 cm (139 in)	330 cm (130 in)	USA Men's Volleyball Team
9	Ryan Millar	22 January 1978	204 cm (6 ft 8 in)	98 kg (216 lb)	354 cm (139 in)	326 cm (128 in)	Lokomotiv Nobosibirsk
10	Riley Salmon	2 July 1976	198 cm (6 ft 6 in)	89 kg (196 lb)	345 cm (136 in)	331 cm (130 in)	Corozal Plataneros
11	Brook Billings	30 April 1980	196 cm (6 ft 5 in)	95 kg (209 lb)	351 cm (138 in)	331 cm (130 in)	Fenerbahce
12	Thomas Hoff	9 June 1973	198 cm (6 ft 6 in)	94 kg (207 lb)	353 cm (139 in)	333 cm (131 in)	USA Men's Volleyball Team
13	Clayton Stanley	20 January 1978	205 cm (6 ft 9 in)	104 kg (229 lb)	357 cm (141 in)	332 cm (131 in)	Ural UFA
14	Kevin Hansen	19 March 1982	196 cm (6 ft 5 in)	93 kg (205 lb)	349 cm (137 in)	330 cm (130 in)	Arkas Spor
15	Gabriel Gardner	18 March 1976	209 cm (6 ft 10 in)	103 kg (227 lb)	353 cm (139 in)	335 cm (132 in)	USA Men's Volleyball Team
16	Richard Brandon Taliaferro	28 September 1977	196 cm (6 ft 5 in)	100 kg (220 lb)	342 cm (135 in)	325 cm (128 in)	ACH Volley
17	Delano Thomas	26 January 1983	201 cm (6 ft 7 in)	95 kg (209 lb)	366 cm (144 in)	339 cm (133 in)	ACH Volley
18	Scott Touzinsky	22 April 1982	198 cm (6 ft 6 in)	88 kg (194 lb)	344 cm (135 in)	330 cm (130 in)	SCC Berlin
19	Alfredo Reft	15 December 1982	178 cm (5 ft 10 in)	83 kg (183 lb)	319 cm (126 in)	309 cm (122 in)	USA Men's Volleyball Team

== Venezuela ==
The following is the roster in the 2008 FIVB Volleyball World League.

No.	Name	Date of birth	Height	Weight	Spike	Block	2008 club
1	Ismel Antonio Ramos Valles	18 April 1985	195 cm (6 ft 5 in)	78 kg (172 lb)	341 cm (134 in)	336 cm (132 in)	Raision Loimu
2	Deivi Yustiz	15 June 1985	201 cm (6 ft 7 in)	78 kg (172 lb)	338 cm (133 in)	333 cm (131 in)	Yaracuy
3	Pedro Siso	5 January 1987	195 cm (6 ft 5 in)	86 kg (190 lb)	338 cm (133 in)	334 cm (131 in)	Karava
4	Joel Alexander Silva Pantoja	14 September 1985	189 cm (6 ft 2 in)	85 kg (187 lb)	330 cm (130 in)	325 cm (128 in)	BYU
5	Rodman Jose Valera Capon	20 April 1982	189 cm (6 ft 2 in)	82 kg (181 lb)	333 cm (131 in)	328 cm (129 in)	Compoktuna
6	Carlos Alberto Luna Contreras	25 January 1981	194 cm (6 ft 4 in)	85 kg (187 lb)	339 cm (133 in)	333 cm (131 in)	Toyoda
7	Luis Diaz	20 August 1983	205 cm (6 ft 9 in)	82 kg (181 lb)	343 cm (135 in)	337 cm (133 in)	Tonno Calippo
8	Andy Agustin Rojas Guevara	2 October 1977	197 cm (6 ft 6 in)	95 kg (209 lb)	315 cm (124 in)	318 cm (125 in)	Unicaja Almeria
9	Francisco Soteldo	23 March 1986	200 cm (6 ft 7 in)	86 kg (190 lb)	347 cm (137 in)	341 cm (134 in)	Lara
10	Ronald Jose Mendez Garcia	26 October 1982	203 cm (6 ft 8 in)	84 kg (185 lb)	357 cm (141 in)	352 cm (139 in)	Bolívar
11	Ernardo Andres Gomez Canas	30 July 1982	195 cm (6 ft 5 in)	100 kg (220 lb)	355 cm (140 in)	350 cm (140 in)	Toyoda Gosei
12	Carlos Arturo Tejeda Rivera	28 July 1980	201 cm (6 ft 7 in)	88 kg (194 lb)	345 cm (136 in)	340 cm (130 in)	Almeria
13	Iván Márquez	4 October 1981	205 cm (6 ft 9 in)	90 kg (200 lb)	372 cm (146 in)	367 cm (144 in)	Pallavolo Pineto
14	Thomas Ereu	25 October 1979	192 cm (6 ft 4 in)	86 kg (190 lb)	340 cm (130 in)	335 cm (132 in)	Taviano
15	Gustavo Valderrama	31 July 1977	192 cm (6 ft 4 in)	80 kg (180 lb)	323 cm (127 in)	323 cm (127 in)	Zulia
16	Jorge Luis Silva Blanco	22 April 1980	186 cm (6 ft 1 in)	80 kg (180 lb)	355 cm (140 in)	331 cm (130 in)	Regatas san Nicolas
17	Juan Carlos Blanco	31 July 1981	195 cm (6 ft 5 in)	83 kg (183 lb)	341 cm (134 in)	336 cm (132 in)	Karava
18	Fredy Ramon Cedeno Marquez	10 September 1981	205 cm (6 ft 9 in)	97 kg (214 lb)	358 cm (141 in)	335 cm (132 in)	Unicaja Almeria
