= Raydel =

Raydel is a masculine given name. Notable people with the name include:

- Raydel Corrales (born 1982), Cuban volleyball player
- Raydel Hierrezuelo (born 1987), Cuban volleyball player
