= Andrea Sala =

Andrea Sala may refer to:

- Andrea Sala (volleyball) (born 1978), Italian volleyball player
- Andrea Sala (footballer) (born 1993), Italian footballer
- Andrea Sala, mayor of Vigevano since 2010, member of Lega Lombarda
