= Ludovic Castard =

French volleyball player (born 1983)

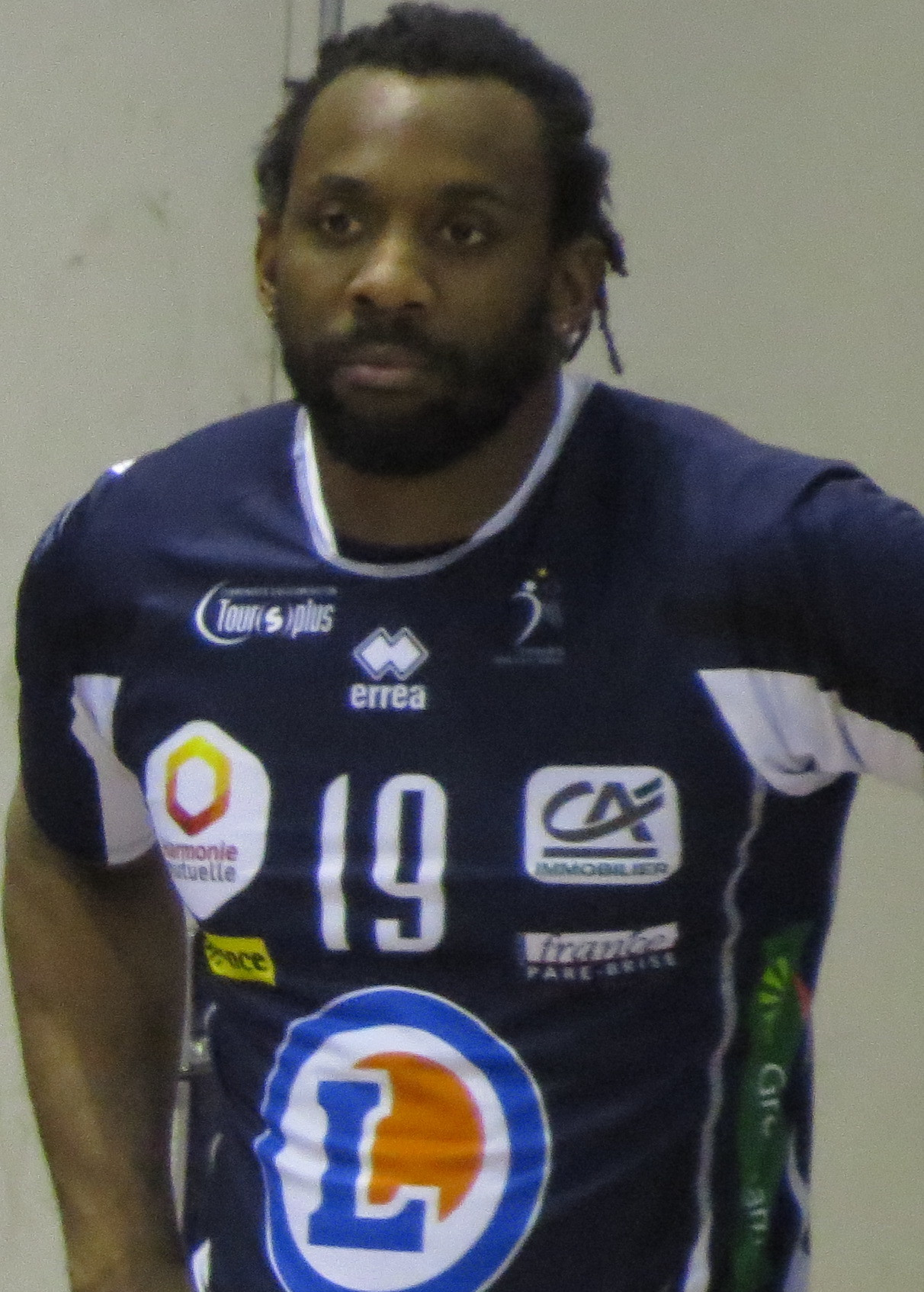
- Castard with Tours in April 2016

Personal information
- Nationality: French
- Born: 18 January 1983 (age 43)
- Hometown: Cannes, France
- Height: 197 cm (6 ft 6 in)
- Weight: 95 kg (209 lb)
- Spike: 348 cm (137 in)
- Block: 325 cm (128 in)
- Education: CNVB (1999–2003)

Volleyball information
- Position: Opposite

Career
| Years | Teams |
|---|---|
| 2003–2006 | Arago de Sète |
| 2006–2008 | Paris |
| 2008–2010 | Cannes |
| 2010 | Panathinaikos |
| 2010–2011 | KPS Kielce |
| 2012 | Arago de Sète |
| 2012–2013 | Montpellier |
| 2013 | Pallavolo Molfetta |
| 2013–2015 | Cannes |
| 2016 | Tours |
| 2016–2020 | Ajaccio |

National team
| 2004–2015 | France |

Ludovic Castard (born 18 January 1983) is a retired French male volleyball player. He was part of the France men's national volleyball team at the 2006 FIVB Volleyball Men's World Championship in Japan. He is of Guadeloupean descent.
