= Hyundai Capital =

South Korean financial services company

Hyundai Capital Services
- Type: Subsidiary
- Industry: Consumer Finance
- Founded: 1993; 33 years ago
- Headquarters: Seoul, South Korea
- Key people: Hyung Jin (David) Chung (CEO)
- Products: Auto Financing; Private Financing; Corporate Financing
- Revenue: ▲KRW 3,245 bn (2020)
- Operating income: ▲KRW 386 bn (2020)
- Net income: ▲KRW 349 bn (2020)
- Total assets: ▲KRW 30,376 bn (2020)
- Parent: Hyundai Motor Group

Hyundai Capital Services (Korean: 현대캐피탈) is a South Korean provider of consumer financial services ranging from auto-financing, private financing, and corporate financing. The company is a financial service unit of Hyundai Motor Group. Hyundai Capital operates in 12 countries – Korea, the U.S., the U.K., China, Germany, Canada, Russia, Brazil, India, Australia, Indonesia, and Singapore.

== History ==
In December 1993, Hyundai Capital Services was founded under the name Hyundai Auto Finance overlooking automotive and housing finances. In 1999, the company changed its name to Hyundai Capital Services.

Hyundai Capital Services started its auto leasing business in 2001 with its inaugural product, "Just Drive." In October 2004, the company established strategic partnership with U.S. conglomerate, General Electric. The partnership paved ways for the companies to share their know-hows and strength in a wide range of businesses including treasury, risk management, finance product design, IT and corporate culture. In 2005, the company founded Hyundai Capital Skywalkers professional volleyball team and completed Skywalkers multi-base camp, Castle of Skywalkers. Hyundai Capital Services obtained Information Security Management System(ISMS) 'ISO27001' certificate in January 2008.

In July 2010, Hyundai Capital Services issued first bonds in Switzerland CHF 200 million-worth Eurobond. In January 2015, Hyundai Capital Services won the S&P credit ratings of A−. Hyundai Capital Services issued US$500 million-worth green bond in March 2016, becoming the first private firm in Korea to issue such debt. In March 2017 Hyundai Capital Services issued Kangaroo bonds worth AUD 400 million, Hyundai Capital Services issued Hyundai Capital's first and greatest dual tranche global bonds worth US$900 million with 5 and 10 years of maturity. In September 2017, Hyundai Capital Services launched "Delivery Car," which service to deliver the car to the place of customer's choice. In May 2018, Hyundai Capital Services signed an MOU with KT Corporation, South Korea's largest telecommunications company, to develop AI finance services. In October 2018, Hyundai Capital Services rolled out "Easy Drive Program," which is a long-term rental car service for foreigners. Hyundai Capital won "Best Corporate 2018" award from the Asset in January 2019.

In 2019, Hyundai Capital issued CHF-denominated green bond worth 200 million, KRW-denominated green bonds worth 200 billion. The company established BAIC Hyundai Leasing in Beijing and Hyundai Capital Singapore branch. In September 2019, Hyundai Capital opened "Digital Auto Finance" website, which offers integrated auto finance services for new car purchases. In 2020, Hyundai Capital issued CHF-denominated public bonds worth 300 million, USD-denominated ABS abroad worth 650 million, KRW-denominated sustainable bonds worth 230 billion, and CHF-denominated green bonds worth 300 million. In July 2020, Hyundai Capital Bank Europe GmbH (HCBE), completed takeover of German auto finance company Sixt Leasing SE, and in December 2020, Hyundai Capital established Hyundai Capital Indonesia (HCID).

== Services ==
Hyundai Capital Services provides auto financing, private financing and corporate financing services. The auto financing service offers lease, rental services as well as new car installment loan, used car loan, direct used car loan. For the private financing service, the company offers credit Loan, car secured loan, housing mortgage loan, loan for lease, housing finance corporation. For the corporate financing service, the company provides corporate loan and corporate lease.

== Global Operations ==
Hyundai Capital currently operates in 9 countries outside South Korea. Its financially operating firms are based in the U.S., Canada, Germany, the U.K., and China. Offices in Russia, Brazil, India, Australia, and the EU provide financial consulting for Hyundai and Kia local distribution companies at respective countries. The company's focus on digital transformation in auto finance propelled its online CPO (Certified Pre-Owned) car business. As of 2020, Hyundai Capital has 4,800 global employees and 96 trillion won in global assets.

Hyundai Capital America

Founded in 1989, Hyundai Capital America (HCA) is a part of the Hyundai Motor Group family of companies, supporting the financial services needs of Hyundai Motor America, Genesis Motor America, and Kia Motors America. Founded in 1989, Hyundai Capital America (HCA) is a part of the Hyundai Motor Group family of companies, supporting the financial services needs of Hyundai Motor America, Genesis Motor America, and Kia Motors America. With assets of over US$35 billion as of 2020, HCA effectively serves more than 1.8 million customers and 1,600 dealers nationwide.

Hyundai Capital Bank Europe

Hyundai Capital Europe, the European Hyundai Capital subsidiary established in 2010 in Germany, received the European Central Bank as well as the German financial authorities' approval to establish a captive bank in Germany in 2016. In January 2017, the bank, Hyundai Capital Bank Europe GmbH (HCBE), has officially launched its operations starting with providing financial services to customers and dealers of the Kia brand. HCBE was the first non-European financial service provider to obtain a banking license from the European Central Bank. HCBE laid a solid foundation for yet another leap forward with the launch of a strategic joint venture with Santander Consumer Finance in 2019. The takeover of Sixt Leasing SE in 2020 is set to propel HCBE's competitive edge in Europe.

Hyundai Capital UK

Hyundai Capital UK (HCUK) is a captive finance company which commenced trading in 2012. It is a joint venture between Hyundai Capital, Hyundai Motor UK, Kia Motors UK and Santander Consumer Finance. It operates under two consumer facing brands, Hyundai Finance and Kia Finance, to provide both retail and wholesale finance to over 350 Hyundai and Kia franchised dealers in the U.K. In 2020 HCUK exceeded GBP 50 million PBT for the first time, continuing its sustainable year on year growth.

Beijing Hyundai Auto Finance

In China, the company joined hands with Beijing Automobile Investment (BAI), Beijing Hyundai Motor and Hyundai Motor to set up Beijing Hyundai Auto Finance (BHAF) in June 2012. BHAF currently covers five brands: Beijing Hyundai Motor Company (BHMC), Dongfeng Yueda Kia Motor (DYK), BAIC, Hyundai Truck & Bus China (HTBC), and Hyundai Import (HI). It provides retail and inventory finance, commercial vehicle finance, and fleet finance. BHAF has been showing resilient growth with its capital increasing from RMB 500 million to 4 billion through three rounds of capital injection.

Hyundai Capital Canada

Established in 2014, Hyundai Capital Canada (HCCA) is headquartered in Toronto and operates as Hyundai Motor Finance, Kia Motors Finance, and Genesis Finance, offering a wide variety of customized financial products for customers and over 400 dealerships. With assets of CAD 3 billion, the company posted pre-tax income of CAD 29 million in 2020.

Banco Hyundai Capital Brasil

Established in 2018, Banco Hyundai Capital Brasil (BHCB) is a joint venture between Hyundai Capital and Santander Consumer Finance. BHCB provides various financial products including wholesale and retail financing for Hyundai Motor dealers and retail customers nationwide under the Hyundai Financiamentos brand.

BAIC Hyundai Leasing Co., Ltd.

In 2018, Hyundai Capital jointly launched an auto lease company with BAIC Group. BAIC Hyundai Leasing provides various auto leasing products.

Sixt Leasing SE

In July 2020, Hyundai Capital acquired Sixt Leasing SE in Germany. Sixt Leasing specializes in management and full-service leasing of large fleets.
