= Alexander Abrosimov =

Russian mathematician

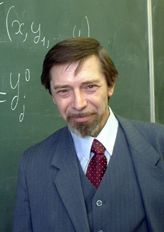
- Born: November 16, 1948; Samara, Russia
- Died: June 20, 2011 (aged 62); Nizhny Novgorod, Russia
- Education: UNN, Moscow State University
- Known for: Pedagogics, mathematics
- Scientific career
- Fields: Mathematics
- Institutions: Advanced School of General and Applied Physics, UNN
- Doctoral advisor: Shabat, Boris Vladimirovich

Alexánder Víktorovich Abrósimov (Russian: Александр Викторович Абросимов; November 16, 1948 – June 20, 2011) was a Russian mathematician and teacher.

== Life ==
Dr. Abrosimov was born in 1948 in the city of Kuibyshev (now Samara). In 1971, he graduated from the Department of Mechanics and Mathematics of State University of Gorky (now Lobachevsky State University of Nizhny Novgorod). Dr. Abrosimov undertook graduate studies in the Department of Mechanics and Mathematics of Lomonosov Moscow State University under the supervision of Professor Boris Shabat. In 1984 he defended his Ph.D. dissertation “Complex Differential Systems and the Tangential Cauchy–Riemann Equations”. Dr. Abrosimov was Associate Professor in the Theory of Functions Subdepartment in the Department of Mechanics and Mathematics and Invited Lecturer in the Advanced School of General and Applied Physics (the base department of the Institute of Applied Physics and the Institute for Physics of Microstructures of the Russian Academy of Sciences).

== Work ==
Beginning from his first works in 1971–3, Dr. Abrosimov studied overdetermined systems of partial differential equations where he successfully applied an original approach developed.

A bright mathematical work in 1988 was devoted to an explicit procedure enabling one to decide whether two given smooth real hypersurfaces are locally CR-diffeomorphic.

Subsequently, Dr. Abrosimov applied his original technique to describe CR-automorphisms of real quadrics of higher codimension. In this direction, he obtained important results and elaborated methods nowadays well known to CR-geometry specialists.

First, Dr. Abrosimov proved that holomorphic automorphisms of a quadric of codimension two are furnished by birational transformations of degree two.

Secondly, he convincingly demonstrated the power of the machinery of differential algebra in CR-geometry. In particular, he proved that under mild conditions the stabilizer of a point in the group of automorphisms of a quadric in Cn is a linear group.

Thirdly, he was amongst the first researchers to look into scrutinizing a class of CR-manifolds of codimension one. To date, the class has remained a focus of active attention and efforts of research.

Overall, Dr. Abrosimov published more than 25 scientific works on complex analysis. Some of the works of Dr. Abrosimov in CR-geometry and adjacent fields in complex analysis are deemed pioneering and his contribution important.

== Selected papers ==
1. A.V. Abrosimov and L.G. Mikhailov (1971). On Some Overdetermined Systems in Partial Derivatives. Proceedings of the Academy of Sciences of the Tadjik SSR, Vol. IV, No. 6, (8 pages).

2. A.V. Abrosimov and L.G. Mikhailov (1973). Generalized Cauchy–Riemann System in Many Independent Complex Variables. Proceedings of the USSR Academy of Sciences, Vol. 210, No. 1 (4 pages).

3. A.V. Abrosimov (1977). Beltrami System in Many Independent Complex Variables. Proceedings of the USSR Academy of Sciences, Vol. 236, No. 6 (4 pages).

4. A.V. Abrosimov (1983). Complex Differential Systems and the Cauchy–Riemann Tangent Equations. Sbornik: Mathematics. Vol. 122, No. 4 (16 pages).

5. A.V. Abrosimov (1988). On Locally Biholomorphic Equivalence of Smooth Hypersurfaces in С2. Proceedings of the USSR Academy of Sciences, Vol. 299, No. 4 (5 pages).

6. A.V. Abrosimov (1995). A Description of Locally Biholomorphic Automorphisms of Standard Quadrics of Codimension Two. American Mathematical Society, 1064–5616/95 (42 pages).

7. A.V. Abrosimov (2003). Linearity of Standard Quadrics of Codimension m in Cn+m . Mathematical Notes, No. 1 (5 pages).
