= Romain Vadeleux =

French volleyball player (born 1983)

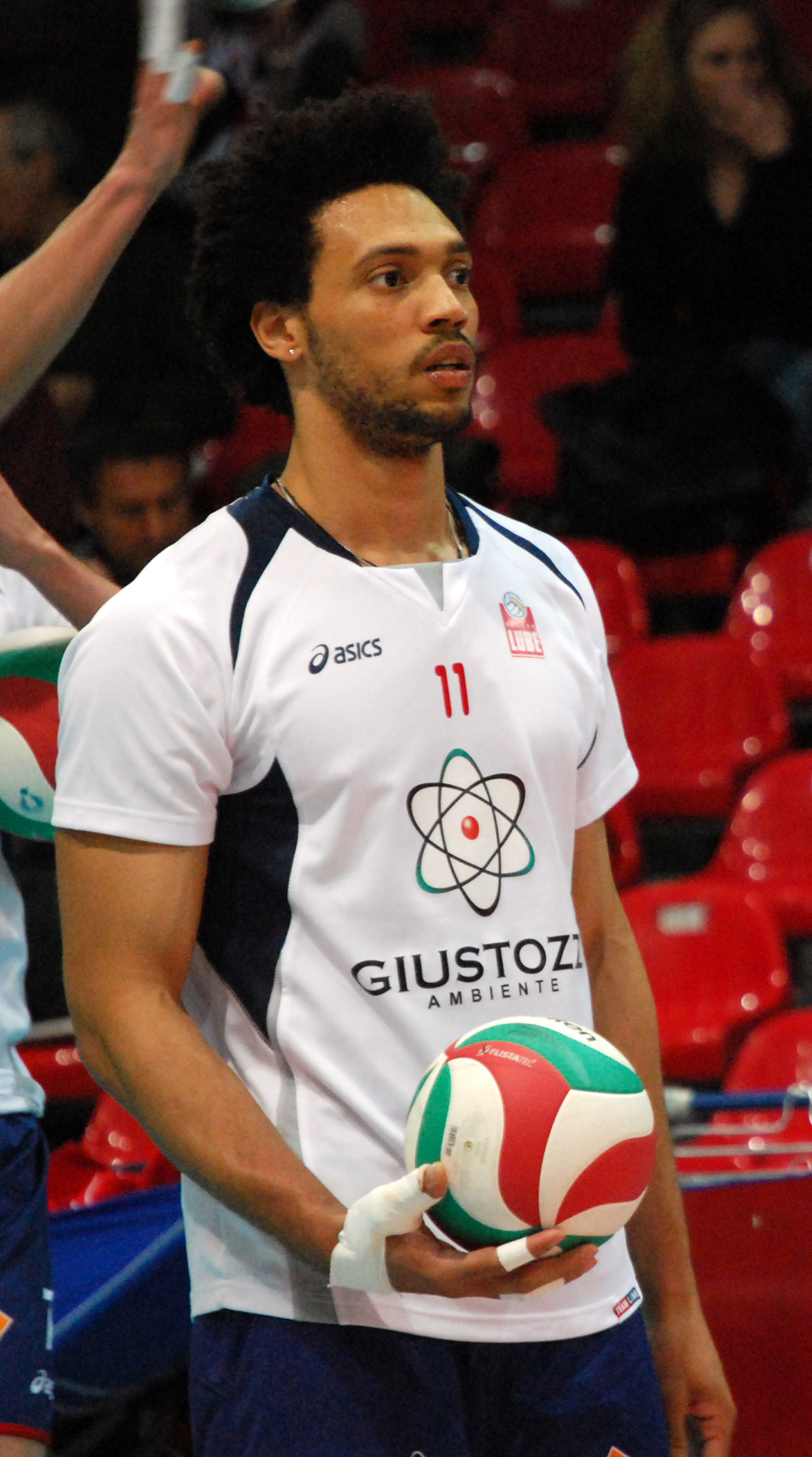

Personal information
- Nationality: French
- Born: 12 February 1983 (age 43); Fort-de-France, France
- Height: 1.96 m (6 ft 5 in)
- Weight: 100 kg (220 lb)
- Spike: 355 cm (140 in)
- Block: 335 cm (132 in)

Volleyball information
- Position: Middle blocker
- Number: 5

Career
Years	Teams
2000–2003; 2003–2005; 2005–2006; 2006–2008; 2008–2009; 2009–2010; 2010–2011; 2011–2012; 2012–2013; 2013–2015	CNVB; Arago de Sète; Avignon Volley-Ball; Paris Volley; AS Cannes Volley-Ball; Saint-Quentin Volley; Lube Banca Marche Macerata; Rennes Volley 35; Chaumont VB 52; Lausanne UC

National team
France
Honours
Men's volleyball
Representing France
World League
Silver medal – second place	2006 Moscow
European Championship
Silver medal – second place	2009 Turkey
- Last updated: 1 January 2018

Romain Vadeleux (born 12 February 1983) is a retired French male volleyball player. He was part of the France men's national volleyball team at the 2010 FIVB Volleyball Men's World Championship in Italy. He played for Lausanne.
