= Konstantin Mitev =

Bulgarian volleyball player (born 1964)

Personal information
- Nationality: Bulgarian
- Born: 16 January 1964 (age 61); Plovdiv, Bulgaria

Sport
- Sport: Volleyball

Konstantin Mitev (Bulgarian: Константин Митев; born 16 January 1964) is a Bulgarian volleyball player. He competed in the men's tournament at the 1988 Summer Olympics.
