= Dejan Bojović =

Serbian volleyball player (born 1983)

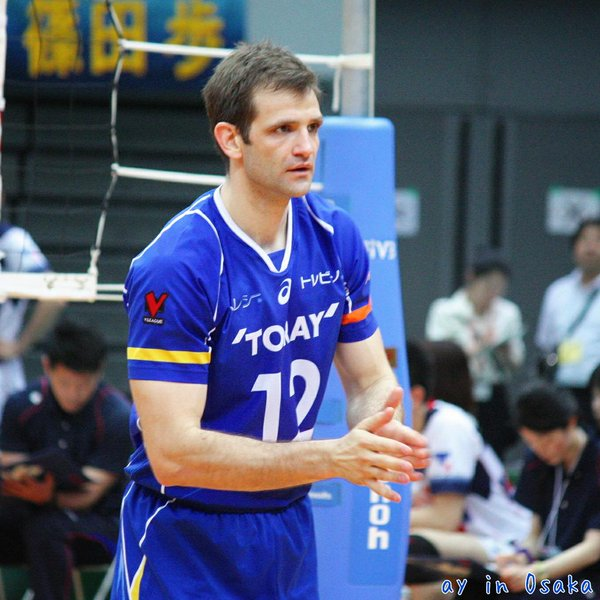

Personal information
- Born: 3 April 1983 (age 43); Smederevska Palanka, SR Serbia, SFR Yugoslavia
- Height: 1.98 m (6 ft 6 in)
- Weight: 96 kg (212 lb)
- Spike: 362 cm (143 in)
- Block: 345 cm (136 in)

Volleyball information
- Position: Opposite

Career
Years	Teams
2000–2005; 2005–2006; 2006–2007; 2007–2008; 2008–2015	OK Crvena Zvezda; OK Vojvodina; Olympiacos S.C. Pallavolo Gabeca; Toray Arrows

National team
Serbia and Montenegro; Serbia
Honours
Men's volleyball
Representing Serbia and Montenegro
European Championship
Bronze medal – third place	2005 Serbia/Italy
World League
Silver medal – second place	2005 Belgrade
Representing Serbia
World League
Silver medal – second place	2008 Rio de Janeiro
- Last updated: 13 February 2017

Dejan Bojović (Serbian: Дејан Бојовић; born 3 April 1983) is former Serbian volleyball player, a member of Serbia men's national volleyball team, a participant of the 2008 Olympic Games, medalist of European Championship and World League.

== Achievements ==
- 2002/2003 Serbian Championship winner
- 2005/2006 Serbian Cup winner
- 2008/2009 Emperors Cup winner
- 2008/2009 Japanese Championship winner, V-league MVP, Best 6 award
- 2008/2009 Best 6 award – Kurowashi Cup
- 2009/2010 Best scorer award – V-league
- 2010/2011 Kurowashi Cup winner, Best 6 award
- 2011/2012 Best 6 award – V-league
- 2013/2014 Emperors Cup winner
- 2014/2015 Best 6 award – Kurowashi Cup
