= Tomislav Dokić =

Serbian volleyball player (born 1986)

Personal information
- Nationality: Serbian
- Born: 27 February 1986 (age 40)
- Height: 204 cm (6 ft 8 in)
- Weight: 97 kg (214 lb)
- Spike: 355 cm (140 in)
- Block: 325 cm (128 in)

Volleyball information
- Number: 13 (national team)

National team
- Years: Team
- 2013: Serbia
Honours
Men's volleyball
Representing Serbia
World League
Gold medal – first place	2016 Kraków
Bronze medal – third place	2010 Cordoba
- Updated on 17 July 2016

Tomislav Dokić (born 27 February 1986) is a Serbian male volleyball player. He is a part of the Serbia men's national volleyball team.

== Sporting achievements ==
=== National team ===
- 2016 FIVB World League
