= Delano Thomas =

American volleyball player (born 1983)

Personal information
- Born: January 26, 1983 (age 43); Berkeley, California, U.S.
- Height: 6 ft 7 in (201 cm)
- Education: University of Hawaii

Volleyball information
- Position: Middle blocker
Medal record
Men's volleyball
Representing the United States
Pan American Games
| Silver medal – second place | 2007 Rio de Janeiro | Team |

Delano Thomas (born January 26, 1983) is an American indoor volleyball player who played as a middle blocker for the United States national team. He was named "Best Server" at the 2007 Pan American Games, where he won a silver medal.

Thomas attended the University of Hawaiʻi from 2001 to 2005.
