= Mauro Gavotto =

Italian volleyball player (born 1979)

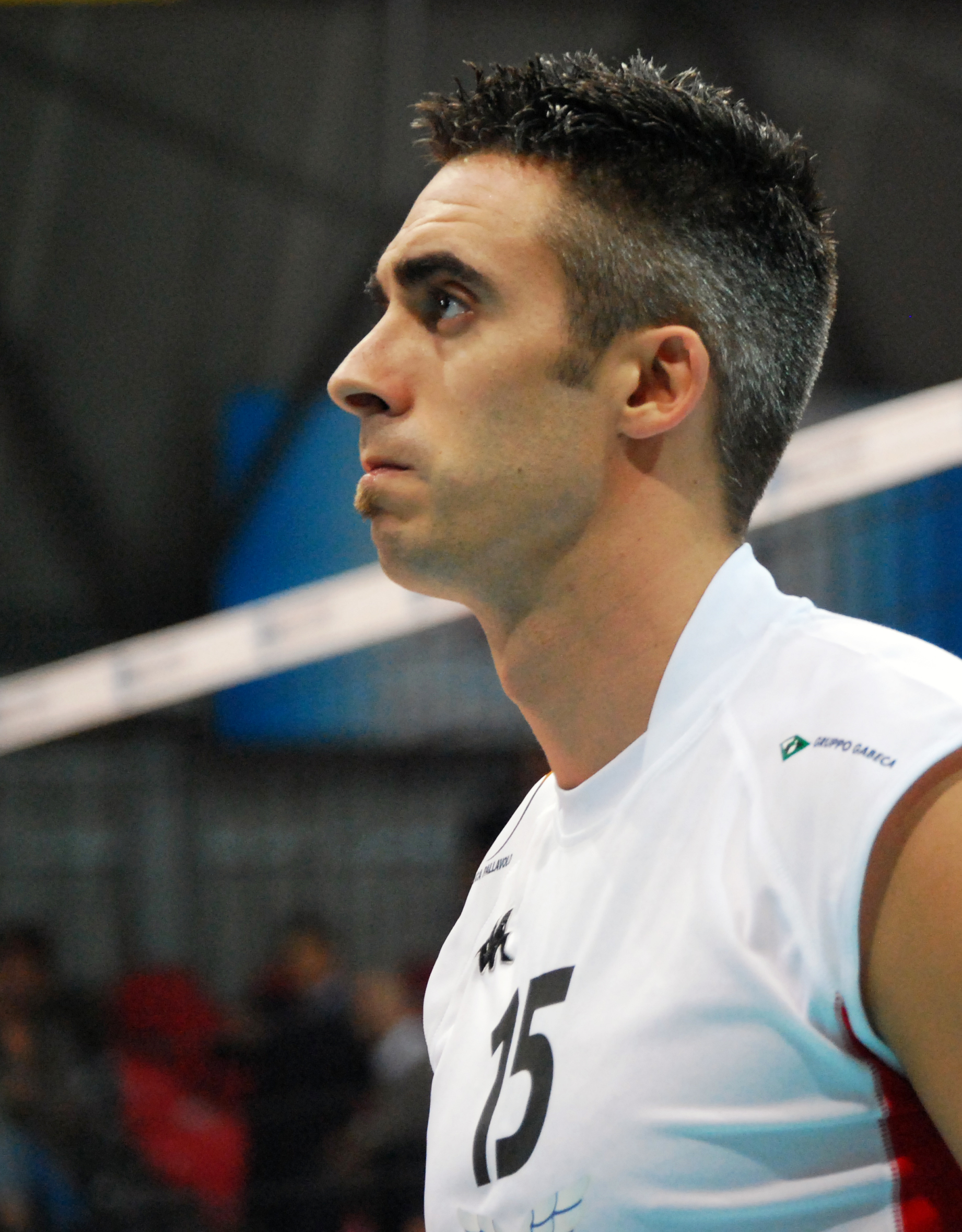

Personal information
- Born: 16 April 1979 (age 47); Cuneo, Italy
- Height: 2.01 m (6 ft 7 in)
- Weight: 88 kg (194 lb)

Volleyball information
- Current club: Pallavolo Gabeca

National team
2001-	Italy

Mauro Gavotto (born 16 April 1979 in Cuneo) is an Italian volleyball player. He finished 4th with his team at the 2008 Summer Olympics. Gavotto in 2004, 2005 Serie A1 League Most Valuable Player.
