= Matteo Martino =

Italian volleyball player (born 1987)

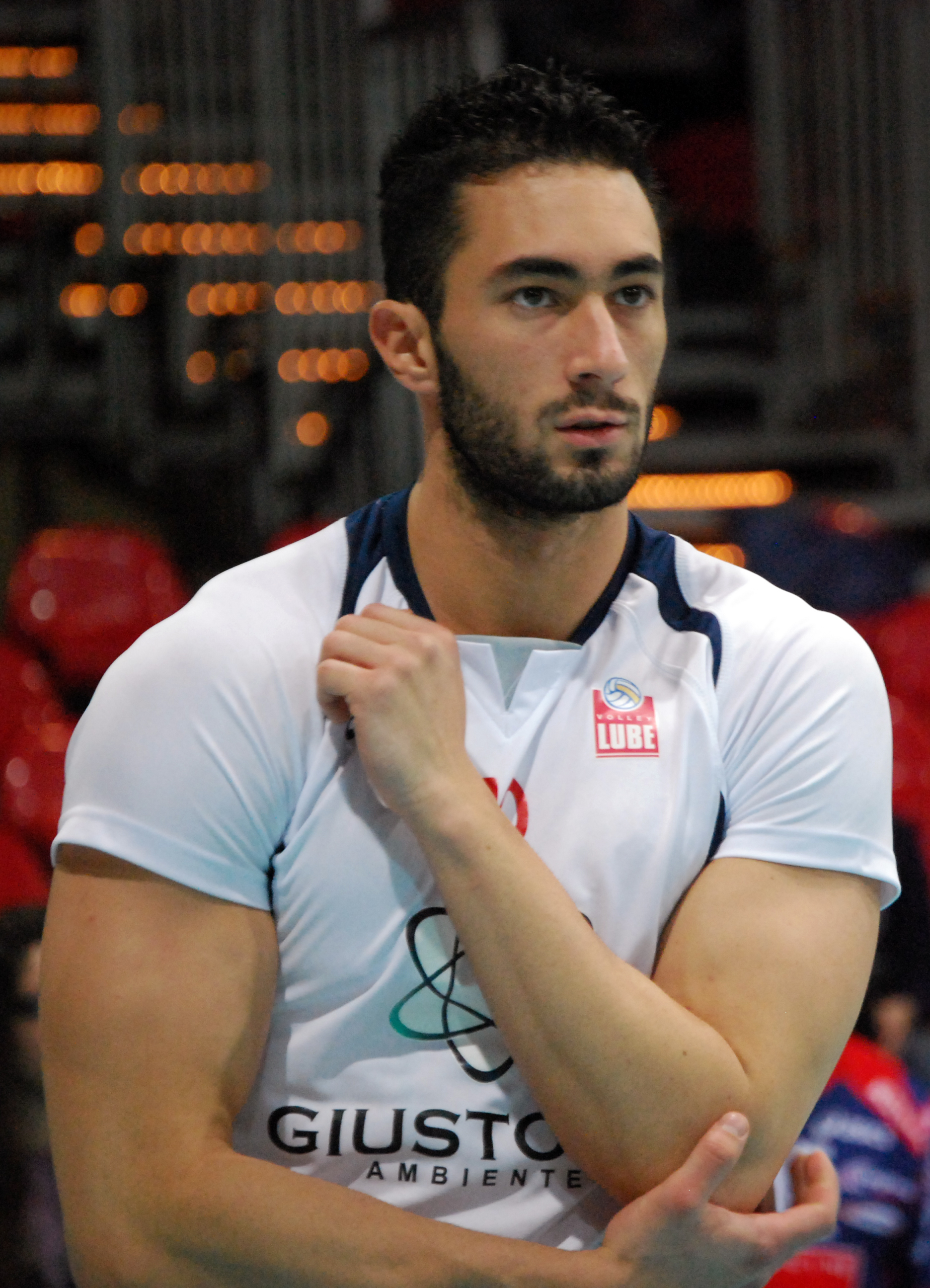

Personal information
- Full name: Matteo Martino
- Born: 28 January 1987 (age 39); Alessandria, Italy
- Height: 1.98 m (6 ft 6 in)
- Weight: 84 kg (185 lb)
- Spike: 355 cm (140 in)
- Block: 325 cm (128 in)

Volleyball information
- Position: Outside Hitter
- Current team: (China) Guangdong Volleyball Club
- Number: 7

National team
2005-2009	Italy
- Last updated: 28 October 2017

Matteo Martino (born 28 January 1987 in Alessandria) is an Italian volleyball player. He finished 4th with his team at the 2008 Summer Olympics. Since 2014 he has been playing for French club Montpellier UC.

== Career ==
=== Clubs ===
Club	Country	From	To
PV Cuneo	Italy	2005	2006
Reima Crema	Italy	2006	2007
Sparkling Volley Milano	Italy	2007	2008
Lube Banca Macerata	Italy	2008	2011
Casa Modena	Italy	2011	2012
Jastrzębski Węgiel	Poland	2012	2013
Lube Banca Macerata	Italy	2013	2014
Montpellier UC	France	2014	
VK Gubernija	Russia	2014	2015
Al-Ahli Sports Club	Saudi Arabia	2015	2016
Guangdong Volleyball Club	China	2016	

== Sporting achievements ==
- 2007 Junior World Championship "Best Scorer"
- 2007 Junior World Championship "Best Spiker"
- 2007 Junior World Championship "Best Receiver"
