= Andrea Sala (volleyball) =

Italian volleyball player (born 1978)

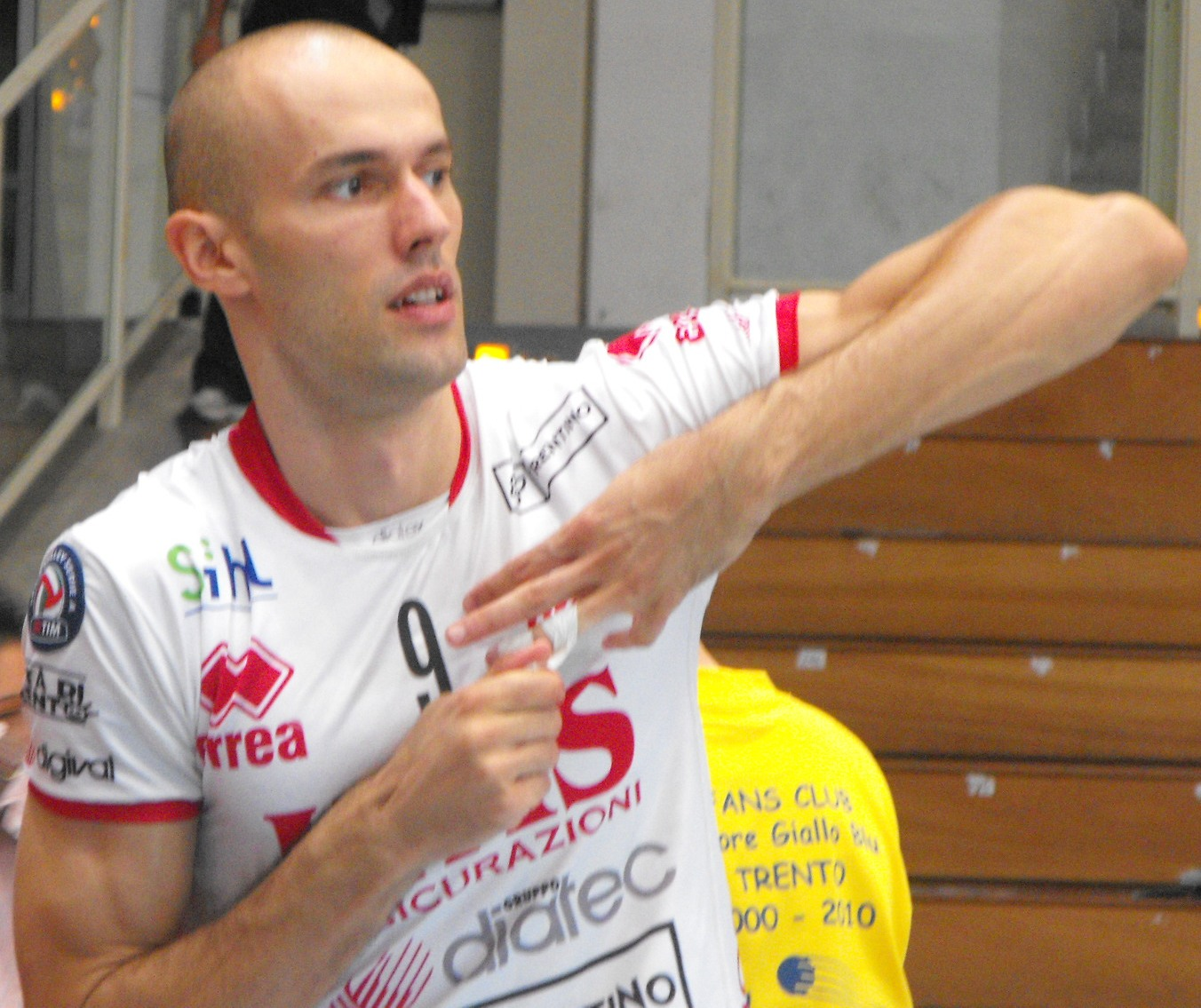
- Sala in 2009

Personal information
- Nationality: Italian
- Born: December 27, 1978 (age 47); Gallarate, Varese
- Height: 2.02 m (6 ft 8 in)

Volleyball information
- Position: Middle blocker

Career
Years	Teams
1997–2000; 2000–2001; 2001–2003; 2003–2004; 2004–2005; 2005–2009; 2009–2011; 2011–2013; 2013–2015; 2015–2016	Pavic Romagnano Sesia; Mec&Gregory's Molveno; Trentino Volley; Piemonte Volley; Callipo Sport; Gabeca Montichiari; Trentino Volley; Pallavolo Modena; Modena Volley; Volley Milano

National team
2007–2011	Italy (97)
- Last updated: 3 November 2017

Andrea Sala (born 27 December 1978 in Gallarate) is a retired Italian volleyball player. As of 2010 he had 87 caps for Italy national volleyball team.
