= Raydel Corrales =

Cuban volleyball player (born 1982)

Personal information
- Full name: Raydel Corrales Poutou
- Born: February 15, 1982 (age 44)
Honours
Men's volleyball
Representing Cuba
America's Cup
Bronze medal – third place	2005 São Leopoldo	Team
Bronze medal – third place	2007 Manaus	Team
Pan American Games
Silver medal – second place	2003 San Domingo	Team
Bronze medal – third place	2007 Rio de Janeiro	Team
NORCECA Championship
Bronze medal – third place	2007 Anaheim	Team

Raydel Corrales Poutou (born on February 15, 1982) is a volleyball player from Cuba, who plays in different positions. He twice won a bronze medal with the Men's National Team in 2007.
