= Arago de Sète =

Arago de Séte
- Full name: Arago de Séte Volleyball
- Nickname: Arago
- Founded: 1953
- Ground: Halle des Sports Louis Marty; 50 Rue des Fauvettes, Sète (Capacity: 1,100)
- Chairman: René Game
- Manager: Fabien Dugrip
- League: LNV Ligue A
- 2023–24: 10th
- Website: Club home page

Uniforms
Home	Away

Arago de Séte is a French professional volleyball club based in Sete, France. They currently compete in the top flight of French volleyball, the LNV Ligue A.

== History ==
Arago de Séte was founded in 1953 by former students of the Arago School, including Maurice Vié, who became the club's first president. The club initially included a variety of sports in addition to volleyball, including judo and table tennis. In 1968 the club became volleyball specific.

== Team ==
=== First Team Squad ===
This is the Arago de Séte team for the 2018–19 Ligue A season.

Head coach: (France) Fabian Dugrip

No.	Name	Date of birth	Height	Position
2	(Italy) Manuel Coscione	January 29, 1980 (age 46)	1.88 m (6 ft 2 in)	Setter
3	(France) Antoine Carreno	December 22, 1999 (age 26)	1.78 m (5 ft 10 in)	Libero
4	(France) Arthur Piazzeta	November 28, 1997 (age 28)	1.92 m (6 ft 4 in)	Setter
5	(France) Theo Bastien		1.88 m (6 ft 2 in)	Outside hitter
6	(France) Axel Truhtchev	April 29, 1995 (age 31)	1.96 m (6 ft 5 in)	Outside hitter
7	(Bulgaria) Branimir Grozdanov	May 21, 1994 (age 31)	1.98 m (6 ft 6 in)	Outside hitter
8	(Finland) Elviss Krastins	September 15, 1994 (age 31)	1.92 m (6 ft 4 in)	Outside hitter
9	(France) Baptist Enfoux	April 1, 1996 (age 30)	2.00 m (6 ft 7 in)	Outside hitter
10	(France) Samuel Jeanlys	March 27, 1999 (age 27)	2.02 m (6 ft 8 in)	Opposite
11	(France) Killian Weidner	April 17, 1997 (age 29)	2.03 m (6 ft 8 in)	Middle
12	(France) Steve Peironet Tupchii	May 20, 1985 (age 40)	1.84 m (6 ft 0 in)	Libero
13	(France) Vasyl Tupchii	January 13, 1992 (age 34)	2.02 m (6 ft 8 in)	Opposite
14	(Canada) Arthur Szwarc	March 30, 1995 (age 31)	2.09 m (6 ft 10 in)	Middle
16	(France) Daryl Bultor	November 17, 1995 (age 30)	1.90 m (6 ft 3 in)	Middle
18	(France) Mathis Courdavault		1.92 m (6 ft 4 in)	Setter
19	(France) Pierre Bouleau	August 6, 1998 (age 27)	1.76 m (5 ft 9 in)	Libero
