= 2016 FIVB Volleyball World League squads =

This article shows the roster of all participating teams at the 2016 FIVB Volleyball World League.

== Group 1 ==
=== Argentina ===
Head coach:	Julio Velasco
Assistant coach:	Julian Alvarez
Doctor(s):	Fernando Locaso
	Aldo Bustos
Physiotherapist(s):	Nicolas Zarate
	Mariano Alzogaray

N°	Name	Date of birth	Height	Weight	Spike	Block	2016 Club
1	Nicolas Bruno	24 February 1989 (age 37)	187	85	338	318	Club Ciudad de Bolívar
2	Lisandro Zanotti	4 October 1990 (age 35)	195	88	336	315	Lomas Volley
3	Jan Martinez Franchi	28 January 1998 (age 28)	190	85	333	316	Club Ciudad de Buenos Aires
4	Martin Ramos	26 August 1991 (age 34)	197	94	348	328	UPCN San Juan
5	Nicolás Uriarte	21 March 1990 (age 36)	192	87	342	322	PGE Skra Bełchatów
6	Cristian Poglajen	14 July 1989 (age 36)	195	94	342	322	Montes Claros Vôlei
7	Facundo Conte	25 August 1989 (age 36)	197	88	354	334	PGE Skra Bełchatów
8	Demián González	21 February 1983 (age 43)	192	82	326	310	Brazil Kirin Club
9	Rodrigo Quiroga	23 March 1987 (age 39)	191	83	336	316	Vôlei Canoas
10	Nicolás Lazo	16 April 1995 (age 31)	192	85	340	320	UPCN San Juan
11	Sebastian Solé	12 June 1991 (age 34)	200	94	362	342	Diatec Trentino
12	Bruno Lima	4 February 1996 (age 30)	198	87	345	320	Club Obras De San Juan
13	Ezequiel Palacios	2 October 1992 (age 33)	198	95	345	325	La Unión de Formosa Club
14	Pablo Crer	12 June 1989 (age 36)	202	85	357	337	Club Ciudad de Bolívar
15	Luciano De Cecco (C)	2 June 1988 (age 37)	191	98	332	315	Sir Safety Perugia
16	Alexis González	21 July 1981 (age 44)	184	85	327	310	Club Ciudad de Bolívar
17	Facundo Imhoff	25 January 1989 (age 37)	202	88	345	325	Lomas Volley
18	Facundo Santucci	6 March 1987 (age 39)	185	87	322	302	Toulouse Club
19	Joaquin Gallego	21 November 1996 (age 29)	204	102	343	323	Club Ciudad de Bolívar
20	Javier Vega	13 May 1991 (age 34)	190	94	336	316	La Unión de Formosa Club
21	Sebastián Closter	13 May 1989 (age 36)	172	68	298	278	Gigantes del Sur

=== Australia ===
Head coach:	Roberto Santilli
Assistant coach:	Benjamin Kirk Hardy
Doctor(s):	Charles Howse
Physiotherapist(s):	Darren Austin

N°	Name	Date of birth	Height	Weight	Spike	Block	2016 Club
1	Aidan Zingel	19 November 1990 (age 35)	207	100	361	346	BluVolley Verona
2	Jacob Ross Guymer	21 June 1993 (age 32)	203	100	350	339	Abiant Lycurgus
3	Nathan Roberts	17 February 1986 (age 40)	199	90	342	328	BAM Mondovi'
4	Paul Sanderson	7 January 1986 (age 40)	195	94	348	335	Knack Randstad Roeselare
5	Travis Passier	26 April 1989 (age 37)	206	99	351	340	Australian Institute of Sport
6	Thomas Edgar (C)	21 June 1989 (age 36)	212	106	357	341	Beijing BAIC Motors
7	Harrison Peacock	31 January 1991 (age 35)	192	87	353	339	MKS Będzin
8	Jacques Borgeaud	19 June 1991 (age 34)	178	70	321	310	University of Regina
9	Max Staples	27 July 1994 (age 31)	194	83	358	345	Noliko Maaseik
10	Benjamin Bell	24 February 1990 (age 36)	200	92	345	333	BK Marienlyst
11	Luke Perry	20 November 1995 (age 30)	180	75	331	315	VfB Friedrichshafen
12	Nehemiah Mote	21 June 1993 (age 32)	204	91	362	354	TV Buhl
13	Samuel Walker	19 February 1995 (age 31)	208	90	350	337	ACH Ljubljana
14	Grigory Sukochev	18 February 1988 (age 38)	196	86	340	329	CSM București
16	Jordan Richards	25 September 1993 (age 32)	193	80	354	342	TV Schonenwerd
17	Paul Carroll	16 May 1986 (age 39)	207	98	354	340	SCC Berlin
18	Lincoln Alexander Williams	6 October 1993 (age 32)	200	104	353	330	VK Selver Tallinn
19	Beau Graham	17 April 1994 (age 32)	202	86	351	332	Habo Volley
20	William Mercer	28 May 1991 (age 34)	199	90	355	342	Linköpings HC
23	Mitchell Tulley	15 October 1996 (age 29)	206	83	356	342	Australian Institute of Sport
25	Jordan Colotti	7 May 1996 (age 29)	188	76	335	325	Australian Institute of Sport

=== Belgium ===
Head coach:	Dominique Baeyens
Assistant coach:	Christophe Achten
Doctor(s):	Frank Pauwels
Physiotherapist(s):	Maarten Klaps

N°	Name	Date of birth	Height	Weight	Spike	Block	2016 Club
1	Bram Van Den Dries	14 August 1989 (age 36)	208	99	361	325	Indykpol AZS Olsztyn
2	Thomas Konings	7 March 1997 (age 29)	202	92	352	320	Knack Randstad Roeselare
3	Sam Deroo (C)	29 April 1992 (age 34)	202	103	354	327	Kedzierzyn
4	Lowie Stuer	24 November 1995 (age 30)	194	82	333	302	VDK Gent Dames
5	Lienert Cosemans	20 October 1993 (age 32)	203	93	340	315	Lindemans Asse-Lennik
6	Sebastien Dumont	18 January 1994 (age 32)	176	76	328	298	Noliko Maaseik
7	Francois Lecat	19 April 1993 (age 33)	200	96	347	320	Verona
8	Kevin Klinkenberg	4 October 1990 (age 35)	197	94	343	314	Łuczniczka Bydgoszcz
9	Pieter Verhees	8 December 1989 (age 36)	205	112	350	322	Monza
10	Simon Van De Voorde	19 December 1989 (age 36)	208	100	355	320	Trentino
11	Lou Kindt	25 May 1997 (age 28)	202	85	345	322	Lindemans Asse-Lennik
12	Gert Van Walle	7 August 1987 (age 38)	197	91	350	318	Beauvais OC
13	Sander Depovere	8 January 1995 (age 31)	196	85	332	310	Topvolley Antwerpen
14	Jelle Ribbens	17 March 1992 (age 34)	185	79	331	300	Nice
15	Stijn D'Hulst	24 April 1991 (age 35)	187	78	315	290	Knack Randstad Roeselare
16	Matthias Valkiers	8 April 1990 (age 36)	194	92	339	310	Prefaxis Menen
17	Tomas Rousseaux	31 March 1994 (age 32)	199	90	352	317	Monza
18	Seppe Baetens	13 February 1989 (age 37)	191	92	345	312	Lindemans Asse-Lennik
19	Laszlo De Paepe	24 June 1996 (age 29)	202	89	342	317	VDK Gent Dames
20	Arno Van De Velde	30 December 1995 (age 30)	210	93	356	350	Knack Randstad Roeselare
21	Jolan Cox	12 July 1991 (age 34)	194	72	342	315	Topvolley Antwerpen

=== Brazil ===
Head coach:	Bernardo Rezende
Assistant coach:	Roberley Leonaldo
Doctor(s):	Ney Amaral
Physiotherapist(s):	Guilherme Tenius

N°	Name	Date of birth	Height	Weight	Spike	Block	2016 Club
1	Bruno Mossa Rezende (C)	2 July 1986 (aged 29)	190	76	323	302	Modena Volley
2	Isac Santos	13 December 1990 (aged 25)	205	84	339	306	Sada Cruzeiro
3	Eder Carbonera	19 October 1983 (aged 32)	204	101	350	330	Sada Cruzeiro
4	Wallace de Souza	26 June 1987 (aged 28)	198	87	344	318	Sada Cruzeiro
5	Sidnei dos Santos Jr.	9 July 1982 (aged 33)	203	98	344	318	SESI São Paulo
6	Tiago Brendle	21 October 1985 (aged 30)	188	83	315	300	Campinas
7	William Arjona	31 July 1979 (aged 36)	185	78	300	295	Sada Cruzeiro
8	Murilo Endres	3 May 1981 (aged 35)	190	76	343	319	SESI São Paulo
9	Raphael Vieira De Oliveira	14 June 1979 (aged 37)	190	82	330	306	Taubaté Funvic
10	Sérgio Santos	15 October 1975 (aged 40)	184	78	325	310	SESI São Paulo
11	Wallace Martins	22 March 1983 (aged 33)	204	100	344	318	Campinas
12	Luiz Fonteles	19 June 1984 (aged 31)	196	89	330	320	Taubaté Funvic
13	Maurício Souza	29 September 1988 (aged 27)	209	93	344	323	Taubaté Funvic
14	Douglas Souza	20 August 1995 (aged 20)	199	75	338	317	SESI São Paulo
15	Lucas Lóh	18 January 1991 (aged 25)	195	83	336	320	Campinas
16	Lucas Saatkamp	6 March 1986 (aged 30)	209	101	340	321	Modena Volley
17	Evandro Guerra	27 December 1981 (aged 34)	207	103	359	332	Suntory Sunbirds
18	Ricardo Lucarelli Souza	14 February 1992 (aged 24)	195	79	338	308	Taubaté Funvic
19	Maurício Borges Silva	4 February 1989 (aged 27)	199	99	335	315	Arkas Spor
20	Franco Willian Cargnin Paese	1 March 1990 (aged 26)	202	93	315	307	Campinas
21	Leandro Vissotto Neves	30 April 1983 (aged 33)	212	108	370	345	JT Thunders

=== Bulgaria ===
Head coach:	Plamen Konstantinov
Assistant coach:	Alessandro Piroli
Doctor(s):	Dinko Z Ahariev
Physiotherapist(s):	Petar Atanasov

N°	Name	Date of birth	Height	Weight	Spike	Block	2016 Club
1	Trifon Lapkov	1 February 1996 (age 30)	198	93	335	310	Montana Volley
2	Metodi Ananiev	17 February 1986 (age 40)	203	100	363	345	Levski Volley
3	Georgi Manchev	20 July 1990 (age 35)	198	88	345	335	Dobrudzha 07
4	Martin Bozhilov	11 April 1988 (age 38)	190	82	320	305	Marek Union-Ivkoni
5	Svetoslav Gotsev	31 August 1990 (age 35)	205	97	358	335	Shahrdari Tabriz
6	Rozalin Penchev	11 December 1994 (age 31)	197	79	337	327	Tokat Belediye Plevne
7	Miroslav Gradinarov	10 February 1985 (age 41)	203	91	350	330	Military Sports Association QA
8	Todor Skrimov	9 January 1990 (age 36)	191	87	348	330	Volley Milano
9	Lubomir Agontsev	26 August 1987 (age 38)	190	87	330	320	Montana Volley
10	Georgi Seganov	10 June 1993 (age 32)	198	83	335	325	VC CSKA
11	Branimir Grozdanov	21 May 1994 (age 31)	198	88	338	327	Besiktas
12	Viktor Yosifov (C)	16 October 1985 (age 40)	204	100	350	340	Ninfa Latina
13	Dobromir Ivanov	11 February 1988 (age 38)	185	75	329	319	Montana Volley
14	Teodor Todorov	1 September 1989 (age 36)	208	94	365	345	Pallavolo Lugano
15	Dimitar Marinkov	9 September 1993 (age 32)	196	84	328	316	Dobrudzha 07
16	Vladislav Ivanov	14 March 1987 (age 39)	188	80	320	310	ASUL Lyon
17	Nikolay Penchev	22 May 1992 (age 33)	197	87	341	335	Asseco Resovia Rzeszów
18	Dobromir Dimitrov	7 July 1991 (age 34)	198	84	345	335	Sir Safety Conad Perugia
19	Tsvetan Sokolov	31 December 1989 (age 36)	206	100	370	350	Halkbank Ankara
20	Aleks Grozdanov	28 March 1998 (age 28)	206	86	355	334	Dobrudzha 07
21	Krasimir Georgiev	13 February 1995 (age 31)	203	83	346	333	Volley Milano

=== France ===
Head coach:	Laurent Tillie
Assistant coach:	Arnaud Josserand
Doctor(s):	Eric Verdonck
Physiotherapist(s):	Jean-Paul Andrea

N°	Name	Date of birth	Height	Weight	Spike	Block	2016 Club
1	Jonas Aguenier	28 April 1992 (age 34)	202	92	340	310	AS Cannes
2	Jenia Grebennikov	13 August 1990 (age 35)	188	85	345	330	Volley Lube
3	Médéric Henry	20 June 1995 (age 30)	212	106	345	327	Arago de Sète
4	Antonin Rouzier	18 August 1986 (age 39)	200	102	350	330	Arkas Spor
5	Trevor Clevenot	28 June 1994 (age 31)	199	89	335	316	Toulouse
6	Benjamin Toniutti (C)	30 October 1989 (age 36)	183	73	320	300	Zaksa Kedzierzyn
7	Kevin Tillie	2 November 1990 (age 35)	200	85	345	325	Zaksa Kedzierzyn
8	Antoine Brizard	22 May 1994 (age 31)	194	96	340	310	Toulouse
9	Earvin N'Gapeth	12 February 1991 (age 35)	194	101	358	327	Modena Volley
10	Kevin Le Roux	11 May 1989 (age 36)	209	98	365	345	Halkbank Ankara
11	Julien Lyneel	15 April 1990 (age 36)	191	87	345	325	Asseco Resovia Rzeszów
12	Stephen Boyer	10 April 1996 (age 30)	196	85	335	314	Chaumont VB 52
13	Pierre Pujol	13 July 1984 (age 41)	186	90	335	315	AS Cannes
14	Nicolas Le Goff	15 February 1992 (age 34)	206	115	365	328	SCC Berlin
15	Horacio d'Almeida	11 June 1988 (age 37)	202	109	355	330	Chaumont VB 52
16	Nicolas Marechal	4 March 1987 (age 39)	198	93	338	327	PGE Skra Bełchatów
17	Franck Lafitte	8 March 1989 (age 37)	203	94	350	330	Arago de Sète
18	Thibault Rossard	28 August 1993 (age 32)	193	85	350	320	Arago de Sète
19	Toafa Takaniko	29 May 1985 (age 40)	194	92	340	330	GFC Ajaccio
21	Mory Sidibe	17 June 1987 (age 38)	194	92	367	330	Palembang Bank Sumsel Babel
22	Hubert Henno	6 October 1976 (age 49)	188	92	330	310	Tours VB

=== Iran ===
Head coach:	Raúl Lozano
Assistant coach:	Cichello Juan Manuel
Doctor(s):	Afroozi Siyamak
Physiotherapist(s):

N°	Name	Date of birth	Height	Weight	Spike	Block	2016 Club
1	Shahram Mahmoudi	20 July 1988 (age 37)	198	95	347	332	Sarmayeh Bank
2	Milad Ebadipour	17 October 1993 (age 32)	196	78	350	310	Shahrdari Urmia
3	Saman Faezi	23 August 1991 (age 34)	204	87	343	335	Paykan
4	Saeid Marouf (C)	20 October 1985 (age 40)	189	81	331	311	Shahrdari Urmia
5	Farhad Ghaemi	28 August 1989 (age 36)	197	73	355	335	Paykan
6	Mohammad Mousavi	22 September 1987 (age 38)	203	86	362	344	Sarmayeh Bank
7	Hamzeh Zarini	18 October 1985 (age 40)	198	98	351	330	Kalleh Mazandaran
8	Farhad Zarif	3 March 1983 (age 43)	165	60	290	271	Sarmayeh Bank
9	Adel Gholami	9 February 1986 (age 40)	195	88	341	330	Sarmayeh Bank
10	Amir Ghafour	6 June 1991 (age 34)	202	90	354	334	Paykan
11	Rahman Davoodi	18 February 1988 (age 38)	195	95	348	328	Matin Varamin
12	Mojtaba Mirzajanpour	7 October 1991 (age 34)	205	88	355	348	Paykan
13	Mehdi Mahdavi	13 February 1984 (age 42)	191	96	330	310	Sarmayeh Bank
14	Mohammad Javad Manavinejad	27 November 1995 (age 30)	200	84	340	320	Paykan
15	Mostafa Sharifat	16 September 1987 (age 38)	204	85	332	313	Matin Varamin
16	Armin Tashakkori	16 August 1986 (age 39)	200	94	352	343	Saipa Alborz
17	Seyed Amin Alavi	22 September 1989 (age 36)	194	85	340	335	Samen Khorasan
18	Alireza Behboudi	10 March 1979 (age 47)	192	90	334	320	Ardakan
19	Mehdi Marandi	12 May 1986 (age 39)	172	69	295	280	Paykan
20	Alireza Mobasheri	10 June 1988 (age 37)	190	90	345	320	Sarmayeh Bank
21	Mohammad Fallah	3 March 1993 (age 33)	190	90	330	310	Sarmayeh Bank

=== Italy ===
Head coach:	Gianlorenzo Blengini
Assistant coach:	Medei Giampaolo
Doctor(s):	Benelli Piero
Physiotherapist(s):	Lama Davide

N°	Name	Date of birth	Height	Weight	Spike	Block	2016 Club
1	Davide Candellaro	7 June 1989 (age 36)	200	88	340	320	Pallavolo Molfetta
2	Gabriele Nelli	4 December 1993 (age 32)	210	100	355	320	Trentino Volley
3	Pasquale Sottile	17 August 1979 (age 46)	186	73	332	310	Top Volley
4	Luca Vettori	26 April 1991 (age 35)	200	95	345	323	Modena Volley
5	Osmany Juantorena	12 August 1985 (age 40)	200	85	370	340	Volley Lube
6	Simone Giannelli	9 August 1996 (age 29)	198	92	342	265	Trentino Volley
7	Salvatore Rossini	13 July 1986 (age 39)	185	82	312	301	Modena Volley
8	Gabriele Maruotti	25 March 1988 (age 38)	195	92	348	340	Top Volley
9	Ivan Zaytsev	2 October 1988 (age 37)	204	100	370	355	Dynamo Moscow
10	Filippo Lanza	3 March 1991 (age 35)	198	98	350	330	Trentino Volley
11	Simone Buti	19 September 1983 (age 42)	206	100	346	328	Sir Safety Umbria Volley
12	Enrico Cester	16 March 1988 (age 38)	202	93	336	321	Volley Lube
13	Massimo Colaci	21 February 1985 (age 41)	180	75	314	306	Trentino Volley
14	Matteo Piano	24 October 1990 (age 35)	208	102	352	325	Modena Volley
15	Emanuele Birarelli (C)	8 February 1981 (age 45)	202	95	340	316	Sir Safety Umbria Volley
16	Oleg Antonov	28 July 1988 (age 37)	198	88	340	310	Trentino Volley
17	Simone Anzani	24 February 1992 (age 34)	204	100	350	330	Blu Volley Verona
18	Giulio Sabbi	10 August 1989 (age 36)	201	92	352	325	Volley Lube
19	Iacopo Botto	22 September 1987 (age 38)	191	76	345	320	Vero Volley
20	Michele Fedrizzi	21 May 1991 (age 34)	192	80	354	325	Pallavolo Molfetta
21	Riccardo Sbertoli	23 May 1998 (age 27)	188	85	326	246	Power Volley

=== Poland ===
Head coach:	Stéphane Antiga
Assistant coach:	Philippe Blain
Doctor(s):	Jan Sokal
	Krzysztof Zając
Physiotherapist(s):	Paweł Brandt

N°	Name	Date of birth	Height	Weight	Spike	Block	2016 Club
1	Piotr Nowakowski	18 December 1987 (age 38)	205	90	355	340	Asseco Resovia Rzeszów
2	Maciej Muzaj	21 May 1994 (age 31)	208	86	360	320	Asseco Resovia Rzeszów
3	Dawid Konarski	31 August 1989 (age 36)	198	93	353	320	ZAKSA Kędzierzyn
5	Wojciech Żaliński	8 January 1988 (age 38)	195	88	340	330	Czarni Radom
6	Bartosz Kurek	29 August 1988 (age 37)	205	87	352	326	Asseco Resovia Rzeszów
7	Karol Kłos	8 August 1989 (age 36)	201	87	357	326	PGE Skra Bełchatów
8	Andrzej Wrona	27 December 1988 (age 37)	205	95	350	265	PGE Skra Bełchatów
10	Damian Wojtaszek	7 September 1988 (age 37)	180	76	330	301	Asseco Resovia Rzeszów
11	Fabian Drzyzga	3 January 1990 (age 36)	196	90	325	304	Asseco Resovia Rzeszów
12	Grzegorz Łomacz	1 October 1987 (age 38)	187	80	335	315	Cuprum Lubin
13	Michał Kubiak (C)	23 February 1988 (age 38)	191	80	328	312	Halkbank Ankara
15	Piotr Gacek	16 September 1978 (age 47)	185	78	325	305	Lotos Trefl Gdańsk
17	Paweł Zatorski	21 June 1990 (age 35)	184	73	328	304	ZAKSA Kędzierzyn
18	Marcin Możdżonek	9 February 1985 (age 41)	211	93	358	338	Cuprum Lubin
19	Bartłomiej Lemański	19 March 1996 (age 30)	217	103	360	345	AZS Politechnika Warszawska
20	Mateusz Mika	21 January 1991 (age 35)	206	86	352	320	Lotos Trefl Gdańsk
21	Rafał Buszek	28 April 1987 (age 39)	194	81	345	327	ZAKSA Kędzierzyn
22	Bartosz Bednorz	25 July 1994 (age 31)	201	84	350	315	Indykpol AZS Olsztyn
23	Mateusz Bieniek	5 April 1994 (age 32)	210	98	351	326	Effector Kielce
24	Paweł Woicki	29 June 1983 (age 42)	183	80	330	305	Łuczniczka Bydgoszcz
25	Artur Szalpuk	20 March 1995 (age 31)	201	93	350	335	Czarni Radom

=== Russia ===
Head coach:	Vladimir Alekno
Assistant coach:	Busato Sergio
Doctor(s):	Arutyunov Gurgen
Physiotherapist(s):	Grevtsov Pavel

N°	Name	Date of birth	Height	Weight	Spike	Block	2016 Club
	Andrey Ashchev	10 May 1983 (age 42)	202	105	350	338	Zenit
	Konstantin Bakun	15 March 1985 (age 41)	204	96	348	325	Gazprom-Ugra
	Yury Berezhko	27 January 1984 (age 42)	196	93	346	338	Dinamo
	Lukas Divis	20 February 1986 (age 40)	201	91	356	334	Lokomotiv
	Artem Ermakov	16 March 1982 (age 44)	188	80	323	313	Dinamo
	Sergey Grankin	21 January 1985 (age 41)	195	96	351	320	Dinamo
	Alexander Gutsalyuk	15 January 1988 (age 38)	205	105	362	345	Zenit
	Taras Khtey	22 May 1982 (age 43)	205	109	351	339	Belogorie
	Egor Kliuka	15 June 1995 (age 30)	203	93	360	350	Fakel
	Igor Kobzar	13 April 1991 (age 35)	198	86	337	315	Zenit
	Dmitry Kovalev	15 March 1991 (age 35)	198	82	340	330	Ural Ufa
	Valentin Krotkov	1 September 1991 (age 34)	195	84	340	330	Yugra-Samotlor
	Alexander Markin	28 July 1990 (age 35)	196	94	350	330	Dinamo
	Maxim Mikhaylov	19 March 1988 (age 38)	202	103	345	330	Zenit
	Dmitriy Muserskiy	29 October 1988 (age 37)	218	104	375	347	Belogorie
	Victor Poletaev	27 July 1995 (age 30)	197	86	360	340	Zenit
	Sergey Tetyukhin	23 September 1975 (age 50)	197	89	345	338	Belogorie
	Alexey Verbov	31 January 1982 (age 44)	183	79	315	310	Zenit
	Alexander Volkov	14 February 1985 (age 41)	210	90	360	335	Ural Ufa
	Dmitry Volkov	25 May 1995 (age 30)	201	88	340	330	Fakel
	Artem Volvich	22 January 1990 (age 36)	208	96	350	330	Lokomotiv

=== Serbia ===
Head coach:	Nikola Grbić
Assistant coach:	Dragan Kobiljski
Doctor(s):	Martinovic Ljuban
Physiotherapist(s):	Stojkovic Borko

N°	Name	Date of birth	Height	Weight	Spike	Block	2016 Club
1	Aleksandar Okolic	26 June 1993 (age 32)	205	90	347	320	OK Crvena Zvezda
2	Uros Kovacevic	6 May 1993 (age 32)	197	90	340	320	Blu Volley Verona
3	Milan Katic	22 October 1993 (age 32)	202	99	345	331	HDI Istanbul
4	Nemanja Petric	28 July 1987 (age 38)	202	86	333	320	Modena Volley
5	Aleksa Brdjovic	29 July 1993 (age 32)	204	90	355	330	ZSK Gazprom-Ugra Surgut
6	Goran Skundric	23 November 1987 (age 38)	197	94	340	320	C.V.M. Tomis Constanța
7	Dragan Stankovic (C)	18 October 1985 (age 40)	205	94	355	330	Volley Lube
8	Marko Ivovic	22 December 1990 (age 35)	194	89	365	330	Belogorie Belgorod
9	Nikola Jovovic	13 February 1992 (age 34)	197	75	335	315	Vero Volley
10	Milos Nikic	31 March 1986 (age 40)	194	79	350	330	Modena Volley
11	Maksim Buculjevic	20 September 1991 (age 34)	192	83	320	307	OK Crvena Zvezda
12	Aleksandar Blagojević	5 August 1993 (age 32)	197	87	330	310	OK Crvena Zvezda
13	Nemanja Jakovljević	6 November 1986 (age 39)	198	90	343	325	OK Crvena Zvezda
14	Aleksandar Atanasijevic	4 September 1991 (age 34)	200	92	350	329	Sir Safety Umbria Volley
15	Tomislav Dokic	27 February 1986 (age 40)	204	97	355	325	Foinikas Syros
16	Drazen Luburic	2 November 1993 (age 32)	202	90	337	331	Volley Piacenza
17	Neven Majstorović	17 March 1989 (age 37)	193	90	335	325	Czarni Radom
18	Marko Podrascanin	29 August 1987 (age 38)	203	100	354	332	Volley Lube
19	Nikola Rosic	5 August 1984 (age 41)	192	85	330	320	Dragons Lugano
20	Srecko Lisinac	17 July 1992 (age 33)	205	90	355	342	PGE Skra Bełchatów
21	Petar Krsmanovic	1 June 1990 (age 35)	205	98	354	330	UPCN San Juan

=== United States ===
Head coach:	John Speraw
Assistant coach:	Matthew Fuerbringer
Doctor(s):	David Dyck Jr.
Physiotherapist(s):	Aaron Brock

No.	Name	Date of birth	Height	Weight	Spike	Block	2016 Club
	Taylor Averill	5 March 1992 (aged 24)	201	94	370	330	Pallavolo Padova
	Carson Clark	20 January 1989 (aged 27)	205	93	365	360	USA Men's Volleyball Team
	Michael Brinkley	15 October 1992 (aged 23)	178	68	305	300	UC Irvine Anteaters
1	Matthew Anderson	18 April 1987 (aged 29)	202	100	360	332	Zenit Kazan
2	Aaron Russell	4 June 1993 (aged 23)	205	98	356	337	Perugia Volley
3	Taylor Sander	17 March 1992 (aged 24)	196	80	345	320	Blu Volley Verona
4	David Lee (C)	8 March 1982 (aged 34)	203	105	350	325	P.A.O.K. Volley
5	James Shaw	5 March 1994 (aged 22)	203	98	354	338	Stanford Cardinal
6	Paul Lotman	3 November 1985 (aged 30)	200	102	336	312	SCC Berlin
7	Kawika Shoji	11 November 1987 (aged 28)	190	79	331	315	Arkas Spor
8	William Reid Priddy	1 October 1977 (aged 38)	194	89	353	330	Volley Lube
9	Murphy Troy	31 May 1989 (aged 27)	202	99	360	350	Lotos Trefl Gdańsk
10	Thomas Jaeschke	4 September 1993 (aged 22)	198	84	348	330	Asseco Resovia Rzeszów
11	Micah Christenson	8 May 1993 (aged 23)	198	88	349	340	Volley Lube
12	Russell Holmes	1 July 1982 (aged 33)	205	95	352	335	Asseco Resovia Rzeszów
13	Daniel Mcdonnell	15 September 1988 (aged 27)	200	90	355	345	USA Men's Volleyball Team
14	Micah Maʻa	16 April 1997 (aged 19)	192	84	323	307	Pacific Rim Volleyball Academy
15	Benjamin Patch	21 June 1994 (aged 21)	203	90	368	348	BYU Cougars
16	Jayson Jablonsky	23 July 1985 (aged 30)	198	91	345	335	P.A.O.K. Volley
17	Maxwell Holt	12 March 1987 (aged 29)	205	90	351	333	Dinamo Moscow
18	Garrett Muagututia	26 February 1988 (aged 28)	205	92	359	345	Tianjin VC
20	David Smith	15 May 1985 (aged 31)	201	86	348	314	Tours VB
21	Dustin Watten	27 October 1986 (aged 29)	182	80	306	295	Nancy Volley
22	Erik Shoji	24 August 1989 (aged 26)	184	83	330	321	SCC Berlin

== Group 2 ==
=== Canada ===
Head coach:	Glenn Hoag
Assistant coach:	Vincent Pichette
Physiotherapist(s):	Jean-Sebastien Hartell

N°	Name	Date of birth	Height	Weight	Spike	Block	2016 Club
1	TJ Sanders	14 December 1991 (age 34)	191	81	326	308	MKS Będzin
2	John Gordon Perrin	17 August 1989 (age 36)	201	95	353	329	Volley Piacenza
3	Daniel Lewis	3 April 1976 (age 50)	189	86	340	325	BBTS Bielsko-Biała
4	Nicholas Hoag	19 August 1992 (age 33)	200	91	342	322	Paris Volley
5	Rudy Verhoeff	24 June 1989 (age 36)	198	88	349	317	SWD Düren
6	Justin Duff	10 May 1988 (age 37)	200	102	370	335	S.L. Benfica
7	Dallas Soonias	25 April 1984 (age 42)	200	91	356	323	Team Canada
8	Adam Simac	9 August 1983 (age 42)	203	101	348	336	Team Canada
10	Toontje Van Lankvelt	1 July 1984 (age 41)	197	91	347	317	Jastrzębski Węgiel
11	Daniel Jansen Van Doorn	21 March 1990 (age 36)	207	98	351	328	Pamvohaikos
12	Gavin Schmitt	27 January 1986 (age 40)	208	106	372	340	Funvic Taubate
14	Max Burt	25 July 1988 (age 37)	207	101	350	327	Nantes Rezé Métropole Volley
15	Frederic Winters (C)	25 September 1982 (age 43)	195	98	359	327	Sada Cruzeiro Vôlei
16	Jason Derocco	19 September 1989 (age 36)	198	94	342	318	Jastrzębski Węgiel
17	Graham Vigrass	17 June 1989 (age 36)	205	97	354	330	Arkas Spor
19	Blair Cameron Bann	26 February 1988 (age 38)	184	84	314	295	SWD Düren
20	Stephen Timothy Maar	6 December 1994 (age 31)	199	99	350	328	Team Canada
21	Jay Blankenau	27 September 1989 (age 36)	194	94	334	307	Abiant Lycurgus
22	Steven Marshall	23 November 1989 (age 36)	193	87	350	322	SVG Luneburg
24	Lucas Van Berkel	29 November 1991 (age 34)	210	108	350	326	Pribam VB
25	Brett James Walsh	19 February 1994 (age 32)	195	84	332	313	Team Canada

=== China ===
Head coach:	Xie Guochen
Assistant coach:	Yang Liqun
Doctor(s):	Song Weiping
Physiotherapist(s):	Zeng Lei

N°	Name	Date of birth	Height	Weight	Spike	Block	2016 Club
1	Zhan Guojun	16 December 1988 (age 37)	197	91	235	230	Shanghai
2	Chen Longhai	29 March 1991 (age 35)	201	85	351	340	Shanghai
3	Yuan Zhi	29 September 1981 (age 44)	194	95	348	334	Liaoning
4	Zhang Chen	28 June 1985 (age 40)	200	89	356	340	Jiangsu
5	Li Yuanbo	27 September 1995 (age 30)	196	80	352	343	Henan
6	Li Runming	1 March 1990 (age 36)	198	93	350	326	Shandong
7	Zhong Weijun	20 April 1989 (age 37)	200	88	347	335	Army
8	Cui Jianjun	1 August 1985 (age 40)	192	94	350	335	Henan
9	Jiao Shuai (C)	28 January 1984 (age 42)	194	75	350	341	Henan
10	Ji Daoshuai	7 February 1992 (age 34)	195	85	355	335	Shandong
11	Geng Xin	15 November 1989 (age 36)	208	97	348	338	Shandong
12	Rao Shuhan	23 December 1996 (age 29)	209	85	354	344	Fujian
13	Fang Yingchao	3 August 1982 (age 43)	198	79	360	350	Shanghai
14	Dai Qingyao	26 September 1991 (age 34)	205	100	350	340	Shanghai
15	Chu Hui	11 February 1981 (age 45)	187	70	355	323	Beijing
16	Tong Jiahua	13 December 1992 (age 33)	180	76	317	305	Shanghai
17	Ke Junhuang	28 June 1994 (age 31)	183	72	330	320	Fujian
18	Liu Xiangdong	23 February 1993 (age 33)	198	93	340	330	Jiangsu
19	Song Jianwei	4 January 1992 (age 34)	194	75	340	330	Shandong
20	Tang Chuanhang	4 October 1995 (age 30)	201	85	345	340	Army
21	Mao Tianyi	2 June 1993 (age 32)	200	84	350	333	Army

=== Cuba ===
Head coach:	Rodolfo Luis Sanchez Sanchez
Assistant coach:	Pavel Noel Pimienta Allen
Doctor(s):	Antonio Jose Iznaga Dapresa
Physiotherapist(s):	Pedro Roche Ricard

N°	Name	Date of birth	Height	Weight	Spike	Block	2016 Club
1	Yosvani Gonzalez Nicolas	18 April 1988 (age 38)	196	85	345	330	La Habana
2	Osniel Lazaro Melgarejo Hernandez	18 December 1997 (age 28)	195	83	345	320	Sancti Spíritus
3	Ricardo Norberto Calvo Manzano	2 October 1996 (age 29)	193	74	343	334	Villa Clara
4	Javier Ernesto Jimenez Scull	16 November 1989 (age 36)	198	89	352	345	Matanzas
5	Javier Octavio Concepcion Rojas	27 December 1997 (age 28)	200	84	356	350	La Habana
6	Osniel Cecilio Rendon Gonzalez	26 October 1996 (age 29)	202	90	350	340	Matanzas
7	Yonder Roman Garcia Alvarez	26 February 1993 (age 33)	183	78	325	320	Ciudad Habana
8	Rolando Cepeda Abreu (C)	13 March 1989 (age 37)	198	77	359	344	Sancti Spíritus
9	Livan Osoria Rodriguez	12 May 1994 (age 31)	201	96	345	325	Santiago de Cuba
10	Darienn Ferrer Delis	31 October 1982 (age 43)	202	90	350	348	Santiago de Cuba
11	Miguel Angel Lopez Castro	25 March 1997 (age 29)	189	75	345	320	Cienfuegos
12	Abrahan Alfonso Gavilan	23 February 1995 (age 31)	197	72	343	320	La Habana
13	Mario Luis Rivera Sanchez	26 October 1982 (age 43)	180	92	343	323	Pinar del Rio
14	Osmany Santiago Uriarte Mestre	4 June 1995 (age 30)	197	81	352	348	Sancti Spíritus
15	Dariel Albo Miranda	17 January 1992 (age 34)	201	82	343	316	La Habana
16	Luis Tomas Sosa Sierra	18 May 1995 (age 30)	196	76	345	320	La Habana
17	Reinier Rojas Cohimbra	31 July 1986 (age 39)	190	78	335	325	La Habana
18	Roamy Raul Alonso Arce	24 July 1997 (age 28)	201	93	350	330	Matanzas
19	Lionnis Salazar Rubiera	25 July 1997 (age 28)	185	77	332	332	Santiago de Cuba
21	Adrian Eduardo Goide Arredondo	26 June 1998 (age 27)	191	80	344	340	Sancti Spíritus
22	José Isacc Masso Alvarez	2 December 1997 (age 28)	199	79	349	347	Guantanamo

=== Czech Republic ===
Head coach:	Miguel Angel Falasca Fernandez
Assistant coach:	Michal Nekola
Doctor(s):	Oldrich Vastl
Physiotherapist(s):	Martin Sedlak

N°	Name	Date of birth	Height	Weight	Spike	Block	2016 Club
1	Jakub Vesely	2 September 1986 (age 39)	207	100	356	340	VK Benátky nad Jizerou
2	Jan Hadrava	3 June 1991 (age 34)	199	99	354	338	Nantes Rezé Métropole Volley
3	Marek Beer	24 May 1988 (age 37)	201	101	354	334	Hypo Tirol Innsbruck
4	Daniel Pfeffer	27 April 1990 (age 36)	184	80	331	322	VK Karlovarsko
5	Lubomir Stanek	5 July 1975 (age 50)	205	105	344	336	VK Dukla Liberec
6	Jiri Vasicek	11 June 1992 (age 33)	192	84	339	323	VSC Zlin
7	Ales Holubec (C)	13 March 1984 (age 42)	199	90	357	335	Nantes Rezé Métropole Volley
8	Filip Habr	27 April 1988 (age 38)	201	92	348	335	Jihostroj České Budějovice
9	Marek Zmrhal	10 August 1993 (age 32)	203	92	348	328	Volejbal Brno
10	Michal Finger	2 September 1993 (age 32)	201	89	361	336	VfB Friedrichshafen
11	Martin Krystof	11 October 1982 (age 43)	179	78	310	300	Jihostroj České Budějovice
12	Matyas Demar	1 October 1991 (age 34)	204	100	100	257	Nantes Rezé Métropole Volley
13	Jan Galabov	12 June 1996 (age 29)	190	90	348	329	VK Dukla Liberec
14	Adam Bartos	27 April 1992 (age 34)	198	85	350	330	Tours VB
15	Donovan Dzavoronok	23 May 1997 (age 28)	202	85	345	334	VK Karlovarsko
16	Jakub Janouch	13 June 1990 (age 35)	194	88	335	325	VK Dukla Liberec
17	Adam Zajicek	25 February 1993 (age 33)	201	92	345	331	VK Dukla Liberec
18	Vaclav Kopacek	21 October 1982 (age 43)	182	80	302	290	VK Dukla Liberec
19	Petr Michalek	19 August 1989 (age 36)	190	80	344	325	Jihostroj České Budějovice
20	Vladimir Sobotka	7 May 1985 (age 40)	203	93	350	328	Jihostroj České Budějovice
21	Filip Krestan	15 December 1987 (age 38)	200	94	348	330	AOV Kladno

=== Egypt ===
Head coach:	Flavio Gulinelli
Assistant coach:	Nehad Shehata
Doctor(s):	Amr Hassan
Physiotherapist(s):	Ihab Tantawy

N°	Name	Date of birth	Height	Weight	Spike	Block	2016 Club
3	Abd Elhalim Mohamed Abou	3 June 1989 (age 36)	210	88	285	270	Ahly
4	Ahmed Abdelhay	19 August 1984 (age 41)	197	87	342	316	ARMY
5	Abdellatif Ahmed	13 August 1983 (age 42)	202	90	345	325	Zamalek
6	Mamdouh Abdelrehim	5 August 1989 (age 36)	207	90	338	325	ARMY
7	Ashraf Abouelhassan (C)	17 May 1975 (age 50)	186	86	325	318	Zamalek
8	Mohamed Thakil	12 July 1986 (age 39)	184	71	326	315	ARMY
9	Rashad Atia	2 September 1986 (age 39)	201	91	348	342	ARMY
10	Mohamed Masoud	1 May 1994 (age 31)	211	105	358	342	Smouha
11	Ahmed Afifi	30 March 1988 (age 38)	194	92	347	342	Zamalek
12	Hossam Abdalla	16 February 1988 (age 38)	203	97	343	321	Ahly
13	Badawy Mohamed Moneim	11 January 1986 (age 40)	195	91	326	319	Zamalek
14	Omar Hassan	4 April 1991 (age 35)	191	104	333	324	ARMY
15	Ahmed Elkotb	23 July 1991 (age 34)	197	80	328	318	Ahly
16	Mohamed Hassan	28 September 1993 (age 32)	193	76	319	302	Zamalek
17	Reda Haikal	7 November 1990 (age 35)	198	85	359	342	Zamalek
18	Ahmed Shafik	7 December 1994 (age 31)	190	97	349	323	Ahly
19	Mohamed Moawad	26 August 1987 (age 38)	194	90	321	310	Ahly
20	Islam Abdelkader	9 February 1994 (age 32)	194	85	319	310	ARMY
21	Mohamed Khater	4 July 1991 (age 34)	200	85	334	328	El Tayaran
22	Ahmed Abdelaal	8 June 1989 (age 36)	188	89	0	0	ARMY
23	Hussein Seddik	21 May 1994 (age 31)	207	94	345	334	Petrojet

=== Finland ===
Head coach:	Tuomas Sammelvuo
Assistant coach:	Nicola Giolito
Doctor(s):	Jari Syrjänen
Physiotherapist(s):	Jesse Kutila

N°	Name	Date of birth	Height	Weight	Spike	Block	2016 Club
1	Anssi Hakala	12 May 1984 (age 41)	184	80	320	305	Lentopalloseura ETTA
2	Eemi Tervaportti (C)	26 July 1989 (age 36)	193	80	338	317	Galatasaray
3	Akseli Lankinen	31 August 1997 (age 28)	194	77	335	315	LEKA Volley
4	Lauri Kerminen	18 January 1993 (age 33)	185	80	332	290	Kuzbass Kemerovo
5	Peetu Mäkinen	19 August 1995 (age 30)	200	84	330	310	Vammalan Lentopallo
6	Niklas Seppänen	30 June 1993 (age 32)	193	84	335	320	Nice VB
7	Eemeli Kouki	26 October 1991 (age 34)	194	84	340	330	Hurrikaani Loimaa
8	Elviss Krastins	15 September 1994 (age 31)	192	85	335	315	Vammalan Lentopallo
9	Tommi Siirilä	5 August 1993 (age 32)	203	102	350	325	GFC Ajaccio
10	Samuli Kaislasalo	3 August 1995 (age 30)	203	94	350	325	LEKA Volley
11	Sauli Sinkkonen	14 September 1989 (age 36)	201	94	345	330	Tampereen Isku-Volley
12	Jan Helenius	13 October 1996 (age 29)	183	74	320	300	Tampereen Isku-Volley
13	Antti Ropponen	17 August 1995 (age 30)	190	87	340	318	Kokkolan Tiikerit
14	Markus Kaurto	31 August 1993 (age 32)	196	85	345	320	Team Lakkapää
15	Henrik Porkka	14 January 1998 (age 28)	202	82	360	330	LEKA Volley
16	Olli-Pekka Ojansivu	31 December 1987 (age 38)	197	90	344	325	Kokkolan Tiikerit
17	Joni Savimäki	28 January 1991 (age 35)	192	90	349	320	Liiga Riento
18	Miki Jauhiainen	8 July 1997 (age 28)	205	85	355	325	Tampereen Isku-Volley
19	Eetu Pennanen	18 September 1992 (age 33)	183	78	335	318	Lentopalloseura ETTA
20	Mauri Kurppa	6 April 1993 (age 33)	185	90	330	315	Hurrikaani Loimaa
21	Niko Haapakoski	1 May 1996 (age 29)	192	74	325	312	Lentopalloseura ETTA

=== Japan ===
Head coach:	Masashi Nambu
Assistant coach:	Koichiro Shimbo
Doctor(s):	Yoshito Hashimoto
Physiotherapist(s):	Masaru Ogata

N°	Name	Date of birth	Height	Weight	Spike	Block	2016 Club
1	Kunihiro Shimizu (C)	11 August 1986 (age 39)	193	94	345	335	Panasonic Panthers
2	Kentaro Takahashi	8 February 1995 (age 31)	201	93	345	330	University of Tsukuba
3	Takeshi Nagano	11 July 1985 (age 40)	176	65	315	300	Panasonic Panthers
4	Tatsuya Fukuzawa	1 July 1986 (age 39)	189	84	355	345	Panasonic Panthers
5	Takaaki Tomimatsu	20 July 1984 (age 41)	191	83	350	340	Toray Arrows
6	Akihiro Yamauchi	30 November 1993 (age 32)	204	72	348	328	Panasonic Panthers
7	Masashi Kuriyama	14 July 1988 (age 37)	189	89	340	330	Suntory Sunbirds
8	Masahiro Yanagida	6 July 1992 (age 33)	186	78	335	305	Suntory Sunbirds
9	Shinji Takahashi	16 July 1980 (age 45)	182	76	315	305	JTEKT Stings
10	Hideomi Fukatsu	1 June 1990 (age 35)	180	70	330	305	Panasonic Panthers
11	Yūki Ishikawa	11 December 1995 (age 30)	191	74	345	330	Chuo University
12	Takashi Dekita	13 August 1991 (age 34)	199	92	350	330	Osaka Blazers Sakai
13	Shunsuke Watanabe	11 April 1988 (age 38)	181	70	325	300	Toray Arrows
14	Daisuke Sakai	22 October 1981 (age 44)	180	76	320	305	Suntory Sunbirds
15	Taishi Onodera	27 February 1996 (age 30)	202	97	330	320	Tokai University
16	Shuzo Yamada	27 November 1992 (age 33)	193	78	340	323	Toyoda Gosei Trefuerza
17	Masahiro Sekita	20 November 1993 (age 32)	177	70	320	305	Panasonic Panthers
18	Yuta Yoneyama	29 August 1984 (age 41)	185	83	340	320	Toray Arrows
19	Ryota Denda	3 July 1991 (age 34)	191	88	345	327	Toyoda Gosei Trefuerza
20	Hidetomo Hoshino	29 September 1990 (age 35)	187	87	331	313	Toray Arrows
21	Sho Sano	17 December 1991 (age 34)	190	86	340	325	Toray Arrows

=== South Korea ===
Head coach:	Kim Nam-sung
Assistant coach:	Kim Sung-hyun
Doctor(s):	Park Ji-hun
	Lee Jae-hyup
Physiotherapist(s):	Nam Hyoung-chun
	Park Chan-ho

N°	Name	Date of birth	Height	Weight	Spike	Block	2016 Club
1	Lee Kang-won	5 May 1990 (age 35)	198	91	330	312	Gumi KB Insurance Stars
2	Han Sun-soo (C)	16 December 1985 (age 40)	189	80	310	297	Incheon Korean Air Jumbos
3	No Jae-wook	10 July 1992 (age 33)	191	86	310	300	Hyundai Capital Skywalkers
4	Park Jin-woo	18 March 1990 (age 36)	198	78	340	318	Woori Card Hansae
5	Kim Yo-han	16 August 1985 (age 40)	200	95	335	326	Gumi KB Insurance Stars
6	Kim Hak-min	4 September 1983 (age 42)	193	81	327	319	Incheon Korean Air Jumbos
7	Jin Seong-tae	3 February 1993 (age 33)	197	85	315	305	Hyundai Capital Skywalkers
8	Park Sang-ha	4 April 1986 (age 40)	198	89	327	315	Woori Card Hansae
9	Kwak Myoung-woo	8 April 1991 (age 35)	193	83	310	300	Ansan OK Savings Bank Rush & Cash
10	Bu Yong-chan	30 November 1989 (age 36)	175	65	290	284	Gumi KB Insurance Stars
11	Choi Min-ho	28 April 1988 (age 38)	198	86	330	312	Hyundai Capital Skywalkers
12	Son Hyun-jong	8 April 1992 (age 34)	197	79	315	305	Gumi KB Insurance Stars
13	Jeong Seong-hyeon	18 May 1991 (age 34)	180	69	290	280	Ansan OK Savings Bank Rush & Cash
14	Song Hui-chae	29 April 1992 (age 34)	191	76	305	295	Ansan OK Savings Bank Rush & Cash
15	Moon Sung-min	14 September 1986 (age 39)	198	89	329	321	Hyundai Capital Skywalkers
16	Choi Hong-suk	26 June 1988 (age 37)	195	80	328	320	Woori Card Hansae
17	Seo Jae-duck	21 July 1989 (age 36)	195	88	315	305	Suwon KEPCO Vixtorm
18	Jung Ji-seok	10 March 1995 (age 31)	194	87	310	300	Incheon Korean Air Jumbos
19	Kim Hyeong-jin	10 March 1995 (age 31)	187	77	305	292	Hongik University
20	Jo Jae-sung	1 August 1995 (age 30)	193	79	300	285	Kyung Hee University
21	Im Dong-hyeok	3 September 1999 (age 26)	199	86	245	240	Jecheon Industrial High School

=== Netherlands ===
Head coach:	Gido Vermeulen
Assistant coach:	Ron Zwerver
Doctor(s):	Rob Vesters
Physiotherapist(s):	Stephan Lutjenkossink
	Alewijn Huisman

N°	Name	Date of birth	Height	Weight	Spike	Block	2016 Club
1	Daan Van Haarlem	15 March 1989 (age 37)	198	89	332	323	Vase Kladno
2	Wessel Keemink	29 May 1993 (age 32)	197	81	337	326	Inter Rijswijk
3	Maarten Van Garderen	24 January 1990 (age 36)	200	89	359	338	Ravenna
4	Thijs Ter Horst	18 September 1991 (age 34)	204	94	364	344	Volley Piacenza
5	Dirk Sparidans	5 March 1989 (age 37)	181	86	326	300	VC Euphony Asse-Lennik
6	Jasper Diefenbach (C)	17 March 1988 (age 38)	195	90	345	330	Montpellier Volley
7	Gijs Jorna	30 May 1989 (age 36)	196	85	340	310	Noliko Maaseik
8	Bas Van Bemmelen	18 August 1989 (age 36)	207	92	350	336	SWD Powervolleys Düren
9	Ewoud Gommans	17 November 1990 (age 35)	202	89	340	320	AS Cannes
10	Jeroen Rauwerdink	13 September 1985 (age 40)	200	92	350	320	Ziraat Bankası Ankara
11	Robin Overbeeke	21 March 1989 (age 37)	198	92	347	328	VC Euphony Asse-Lennik
12	Kay Van Dijk	25 June 1984 (age 41)	214	102	365	355	Al-Ain
13	Floris Van Rekom	8 May 1991 (age 34)	196	82	352	332	Nantes Rezé Métropole Volley
14	Nimir Abdel-Aziz	5 February 1992 (age 34)	201	86	365	350	Poitiers
15	Thomas Koelewijn	18 December 1988 (age 37)	206	100	360	350	AZS Olsztyn
16	Wouter Ter Maat	7 May 1991 (age 34)	200	90	351	338	VDK Gent Dames
17	Michael Parkinson	23 November 1991 (age 34)	203	98	365	350	SWD Powervolleys Düren
18	Robbert Andringa	28 April 1990 (age 36)	192	85	330	310	VC Euphony Asse-Lennik
19	Just Dronkers	7 June 1993 (age 32)	187	78	330	308	Abiant Lycurgus
20	Fabian Plak	23 July 1997 (age 28)	197	83	330	326	Talentteam Papendal Arnhem
21	Sjoerd Hoogendoorn	17 February 1991 (age 35)	198	85	354	332	Argos Volley

=== Portugal ===
Head coach:	José Francisco dos Santos
Assistant coach:	Hugo Silva
Doctor(s):	C Magalhães
	R Aido
Physiotherapist(s):	Gustavo Figueiredo

N°	Name	Date of birth	Height	Weight	Spike	Block	2016 Club
1	Marcel Keller Gil	8 May 1990 (age 35)	208	94	352	333	Monteros Voley Club
2	Bruno Cunha	18 August 1997 (age 28)	193	90	320	308	Vitoria SC
3	Afonso Guerreiro	28 December 1994 (age 31)	197	70	319	300	Sau Mamede
4	Filip Cveticanin	19 June 1996 (age 29)	199	90	320	310	Castêlo da Maia Ginásio Clube
5	Marco Ferreira	4 October 1987 (age 38)	202	94	359	337	SC Espinho
6	Alexandre Ferreira (C)	13 November 1991 (age 34)	202	87	361	346	Ziraat Bankası Ankara
7	Ivo Casas	21 September 1992 (age 33)	180	71	290	278	SL Benfica
8	Tiago Violas	27 March 1989 (age 37)	193	82	326	303	AJ Fonte Bastardo
9	Phelipe Martins	2 March 1991 (age 35)	201	91	307	289	SC Espinho
10	André Rosa	26 January 1997 (age 29)	184	80	312	295	Esmoriz Ginásio Clube
11	João Oliveira	31 July 1995 (age 30)	196	80	330	318	SL Benfica
12	Lourenço Martins	30 April 1997 (age 28)	195	78	308	298	Castelo da Maia GC
13	Valdir Sequeira	22 November 1981 (age 44)	196	86	351	344	Maccabi Tel Aviv
14	Fabrício Silva	24 October 1981 (age 44)	196	96	347	320	SC Espinho
15	Miguel Tavares Rodrigues	2 March 1993 (age 33)	188	68	315	293	LPR Piacenza
16	Hugo Gaspar	2 September 1982 (age 43)	200	83	354	343	SL Benfica
17	João Fidalgo	2 November 1986 (age 39)	172	67	307	285	AJ Fonte Bastardo
18	André Reis Lopes	12 September 1982 (age 43)	193	86	342	332	SL Benfica
19	Diogo Pereira	21 June 1997 (age 28)	200	70	310	300	VC Viana
20	Francisco Rocha	5 July 1991 (age 34)	194	88	313	291	CA Madalena
21	José Monteiro	21 October 1991 (age 34)	183	70	301	290	AJ Fonte Bastardo

=== Slovakia ===
Head coach:	Miroslav Palgut
Assistant coach:	Andrej Kravarik
Doctor(s):	Jan Berec
Physiotherapist(s):	Pawel Baryla

N°	Name	Date of birth	Height	Weight	Spike	Block	2016 Club
2	Tomas Krisko	19 December 1988 (age 37)	202	91	350	328	VK Dukla Liberec
3	Emanuel Kohut	21 July 1982 (age 43)	206	97	359	345	volley Piacenza
4	Peter Ondrovic	28 March 1995 (age 31)	199	95	347	325	TSV Herrsching
5	Matej Kubs	26 May 1988 (age 37)	188	82	341	315	SPU Nitra
6	Filip Palgut	23 September 1991 (age 34)	202	90	348	330	SK Posojilnica Aich/Dob
7	Peter Michalovic	26 May 1990 (age 35)	200	95	349	335	Callipo Sport
8	Martin Sopko (C)	30 January 1982 (age 44)	195	90	354	330	Mirad Presov
9	Peter Mlynarcik	29 November 1991 (age 34)	200	98	350	330	SK Posojilnica Aich/Dob
10	Peter Kasper	12 March 1985 (age 41)	201	105	345	330	SPU Nitra
11	Martin Turis	27 August 1993 (age 32)	181	183	325	310	SPU Nitra
12	Matej Patak	8 June 1990 (age 35)	197	88	353	330	AZS Częstochowa
13	Stefan Chrtiansky	17 August 1989 (age 36)	207	97	350	335	Hypo Tirol Innsbruck
15	Juraj Zatko	5 June 1987 (age 38)	192	87	347	320	SPU Nitra (SVK)
16	Radoslav Presinsky	14 January 1989 (age 37)	206	100	345	327	AERO Odolena Voda
18	Lubos Kostolani	28 November 1990 (age 35)	203	95	352	335	TV Bühl
19	Filip Gavenda	13 January 1996 (age 30)	200	88	359	330	Power Volley Milano
21	Jan Halaj	17 June 1991 (age 34)	189	87	316	300	Mirad Presov
22	Marek Mikula	23 February 1988 (age 38)	196	88	341	323	VK Ostrava
23	Michal Petras	5 December 1996 (age 29)	191	79	352	320	COP Trencin
24	Marek Ludha	19 November 1993 (age 32)	200	90	349	327	SPU Nitra
25	Jan Tarabus	27 August 1995 (age 30)	202	98	350	325	Spartak VKP Komarno

=== Turkey ===
Head coach:	Emanuele Zanini
Assistant coach:	Ali Yilmaz
Doctor(s):	Abdulaziz Turksoylu
Physiotherapist(s):	Murat Aydin

N°	Name	Date of birth	Height	Weight	Spike	Block	2016 Club
1	Ulas Kiyak (C)	11 August 1981 (age 44)	187	82	335	310	Halkbank Ankara
2	Gokhan Gokgoz	6 January 1993 (age 33)	200	94	345	327	Arkas Spor
3	Ozkan Hayirli	27 May 1984 (age 41)	201	93	329	320	I.B.B.
4	Baturalp Burak Gungor	28 July 1993 (age 32)	189	70	345	330	Ziraat Bankasi
5	Hasan Yesilbudak	11 January 1984 (age 42)	192	82	320	310	Halkbank Ankara
6	Burak Mert	23 October 1990 (age 35)	185	81	315	295	I.B.B.
7	Brahim Basaran	13 July 1985 (age 40)	204	93	345	320	M. Milli Piyango
8	Burutay Subasi	15 July 1990 (age 35)	195	97	345	325	Halkbank Ankara
9	Serhat Coskun	18 July 1986 (age 39)	198	82	348	338	M. Milli Piyango
10	Arslan Eksi	17 July 1985 (age 40)	198	80	340	322	I.B.B.
11	Ibrahim Emet	15 January 1986 (age 40)	210	97	348	332	Galatasaray
12	Vahit Emre Savas	7 March 1995 (age 31)	200	87	332	318	Ziraat Bankasi
13	Ogulcan Yatgin	28 April 1997 (age 29)	197	87	320	309	Fenerbahce
14	Faik Samet Gunes	27 May 1993 (age 32)	203	96	343	330	Halkbank Ankara
15	Metin Toy	3 May 1994 (age 31)	202	95	348	328	Fenerbahce
16	Murat Yenipazar	1 January 1993 (age 33)	193	74	339	322	I.B.B.
17	Caner Dengin	15 December 1987 (age 38)	190	77	310	298	Halkbank Ankara
18	Kadir Cin	7 May 1987 (age 38)	204	95	343	326	I.B.B.
19	Yigit Gulmezoglu	28 December 1995 (age 30)	194	81	355	320	Arkas Spor
20	Mustafa Koc	23 February 1992 (age 34)	202	90	360	345	Arkas Spor
21	Firat Ezel Filiz	29 October 1988 (age 37)	198	100	345	330	Belediye Plevne

== Group 3 ==
=== Spain ===
Head coach:	Fernando Muñoz
Assistant coach:	Carlos Carreño
Doctor(s):	Juan Antonio Vallejo
Physiotherapist(s):	Omid Etemad

N°	Name	Date of birth	Height	Weight	Spike	Block	2016 Club
1	Augusto Renato Colito Lopes	23 January 1997 (age 29)	195	90	350	340	UBE L'Illa-Grau
2	Sergi Reñé Giralt	31 August 1997 (age 28)	203	85	338	330	CV Sant Martí
3	Sergio Noda Blanco (C)	23 March 1987 (age 39)	191	87	338	325	Emma Villas Siena
4	Ignacio Sánchez	24 February 1991 (age 35)	191	76	332	321	CDV Río Duero
5	Alejandro Vigil	11 February 1993 (age 33)	204	89	348	330	CV Teruel
6	Borja Ruiz	26 July 1992 (age 33)	200	87	340	330	CV Almería
7	Andrés J. Villena	27 February 1993 (age 33)	194	88	356	330	CV Almería
8	Mario Ferrera	18 January 1987 (age 39)	187	85	330	310	CV Almería
9	Daniel Rocamora Blazquez	27 May 1988 (age 37)	203	104	348	332	Unirea Dej
10	Jorge Fernández Valcarcel	4 May 1989 (age 36)	201	90	345	325	Paris Volley
11	Miguel Ángel De Amo	16 September 1985 (age 40)	185	79	342	320	CV Almería
12	Gerard Osorio	29 March 1993 (age 33)	200	89	346	331	Ushuaïa Ibiza Voley
13	Antoni Llabres	20 November 1991 (age 34)	189	77	330	320	CV Almería
14	Miguel Angel Fornes	6 September 1993 (age 32)	202	94	354	339	Narbonne Volley
15	Carlos Jiménez	12 August 1995 (age 30)	192	65	320	309	CDV Río Duero
16	Carlos Mora Sabaté	19 March 1990 (age 36)	197	88	340	320	SVG Lüneburg
17	Francisco J. Ruiz	7 June 1991 (age 34)	178	70	334	310	CV Teruel
18	Juan Manuel González Limón	11 January 1994 (age 32)	192	83	334	315	CV Almería
19	Javier Sánchez Carreres	21 January 1996 (age 30)	190	76	320	310	Vecindario ACE G.C.
20	Daniel Macarro Tortajada	18 November 1993 (age 32)	198	90	335	325	CDV Río Duero
21	David Sanllehí	20 June 1991 (age 34)	188	75	338	320	Herbiers

=== Germany ===
Head coach:	Vital Heynen
Assistant coach:
Doctor(s):	Oliver Oetke
Physiotherapist(s):	Ulf Nitschke

N°	Name	Date of birth	Height	Weight	Spike	Block	2016 Club
1	Christian Fromm	15 August 1990 (age 35)	204	99	345	324	Sir Safety Perugia
2	Ruben Schott	8 July 1994 (age 31)	192	85	326	309	Berlin Recycling Volleys
3	Thilo Späth-Westerholt	8 June 1987 (age 38)	187	86	321	301	VfB Friedrichshafen
4	Moritz Karlitzek	12 August 1996 (age 29)	191	91	335	310	TV Rottenburg
5	Sebastian Kühner	15 March 1987 (age 39)	203	94	360	341	Berlin Recycling Volleys
6	Denys Kaliberda	24 June 1990 (age 35)	193	95	343	314	Sir Safety Perugia
7	Dirk Westphal	31 January 1986 (age 40)	203	92	354	331	Nantes Rezé Métropole Volley
8	Marcus Böhme (C)	25 August 1985 (age 40)	211	116	360	330	Cuprum Lubin
9	Jan Zimmermann	12 February 1993 (age 33)	190	82	340	312	United Volleys Rhein Main
10	Moritz Reichert	15 March 1995 (age 31)	194	85	336	314	United Volleys Rhein Main
11	Lukas Kampa	29 November 1986 (age 39)	196	90	335	320	Czarni Radom
12	Leonhard Tille	17 March 1995 (age 31)	182	72	325	312	VSG Coburg/Grub
13	Simon Hirsch	3 April 1992 (age 34)	204	96	352	344	Ninfa Latina
14	Tom Strohbach	27 May 1992 (age 33)	196	83	338	329	TV Rottenburg
15	Tim Broshog	2 December 1987 (age 38)	205	112	340	332	Noliko Maaseik
16	Julian Zenger	26 August 1997 (age 28)	190	80	330	315	VfB Friedrichshafen
17	David Sossenheimer	21 June 1996 (age 29)	193	85	325	313	TV Bühl
18	Georg Klein	22 August 1991 (age 34)	201	94	348	335	Topvolley Antwerpen
19	Daniel Malescha	28 April 1994 (age 32)	203	90	330	315	TSV Herrsching
20	Philipp Collin	28 October 1990 (age 35)	204	98	342	335	Tours VB
21	Tobias Krick	22 October 1998 (age 27)	210	85	350	330	United Volleys Rhein Main

=== Greece ===
Head coach:	Sotirios Drikos
Assistant coach:	Konstantinos Delikostas
Doctor(s):	Michail Chantes
Physiotherapist(s):	Stylianos Navrozidis

N°	Name	Date of birth	Height	Weight	Spike	Block	2016 Club
1	Dmytro Filippov	4 December 1990 (age 35)	198	84	343	320	Olympiacos S.C.
2	Mitar Tzourits (C)	25 April 1989 (age 37)	211	95	360	350	Trentino Volley
3	Dimitrios Gkaras	12 November 1985 (age 40)	181	74	282	280	P.A.O.K.
4	Georgios Papalexiou	28 August 1999 (age 26)	202	79	292	282	Niki Aiginio
5	Athanassios Terzis	17 March 1979 (age 47)	193	85	335	325	P.A.O.K.
6	Konstantinos Stivachtis	22 May 1980 (age 45)	186	80	305	295	Olympiakos S.C.
7	Georgios Petreas	19 November 1986 (age 39)	201	92	342	320	GFC Ajaccio VB
8	Georgios Tzioumakas	23 January 1995 (age 31)	202	85	332	312	Perugia Volley
9	Dimitrios Zisis	2 April 1994 (age 32)	183	72	290	280	Foinikas Syros
10	Andreas Andreadis	14 January 1982 (age 44)	205	99	260	315	Foinikas Syros
11	Ioannis Roumeliotakis	25 June 1989 (age 36)	188	82	322	305	Kifisias
12	Nikolaos Smaragdis	12 February 1982 (age 44)	202	89	328	318	P.A.O.K.
13	Rafail Koumentakis	5 May 1993 (age 32)	203	84	330	310	CMC Romagna
14	Anestis Dalakouras	18 June 1993 (age 32)	196	82	307	328	Ethnikos Alexandroupolis
15	Andreas-Dimitrios Fragkos	21 December 1989 (age 36)	200	93	320	315	Narbonne Volley
16	Athanasios Maroulis	9 July 1988 (age 37)	191	83	336	320	Panathinaikos
17	Athanasios Protopsaltis	12 September 1993 (age 32)	185	73	325	316	Narbonne Volley
18	Anastasios-Stamatios Aspiotis	19 March 1991 (age 35)	201	80	335	320	APS Kyzikos Neas Peramou
19	Nikolaos Palentzas	6 April 1991 (age 35)	198	88	330	315	Iraklis Thessaloniki
20	Panagiotis Pelekoudas	8 November 1989 (age 36)	202	97	348	339	Pamvohaikos
21	Menelaos Kokkinakis	21 January 1993 (age 33)	193	79	325	305	Olympiacos S.C.

=== Kazakhstan ===
Head coach:	Rafail Gilyazutdinov
Assistant coach:	Patrakov Andrey
Doctor(s):	Ismailov Rustam

N°	Name	Date of birth	Height	Weight	Spike	Block	2016 Club
1	Roman Fartov	2 December 1992 (age 33)	184	83	325	315	Pavlodar VC
2	Anton Kuznetsov	25 September 1989 (age 36)	204	91	346	335	Almaty VC
3	Nursultan Bimurza	10 March 1994 (age 32)	195	75	335	320	Almaty VC
4	Alexandr Stolnikov (C)	17 July 1988 (age 37)	197	95	340	325	Atyrau VC
5	Sergey Kuznetsov	26 October 1993 (age 32)	197	89	330	315	Atyrau VC
6	Almaz Issin	28 May 1990 (age 35)	194	77	345	335	Pavlodar VC
7	Asset Bazarkulov	1 March 1987 (age 39)	202	87	340	330	Altay VC
8	Kanat Gabdulin	4 March 1985 (age 41)	194	85	330	325	Almaty VC
9	Vitaliy Mironenko	18 May 1985 (age 40)	187	90	331	329	Pavlodar VC
10	Maxim Michshenko	10 September 1990 (age 35)	197	94	355	315	Esil VC
11	Damir Akimov	22 September 1991 (age 34)	202	100	360	330	Altay VC
12	Nodirkhan Kadirkhanov	6 September 1991 (age 34)	203	85	340	330	Almaty VC
13	Vitaliy Erdshtein	5 May 1992 (age 33)	205	90	350	335	Almaty VC
14	Sergey Kostiv	25 January 1987 (age 39)	201	99	350	335	Essil VC
15	Vladimir Prokofyev	9 February 1993 (age 33)	203	94	345	330	TNK-Kazchrome
16	Mirlan Badashev	5 August 1989 (age 36)	173	79	320	300	Altay VC
17	Vassiliy Donets	10 July 1988 (age 37)	195	90	340	325	Altay VC
18	Vitaliy Vorivodin	31 July 1990 (age 35)	194	101	347	335	Almaty VC
19	Maxim Mamedov	19 July 1987 (age 38)	200	88	340	320	TNK-Kazchrome
20	Sergey Rezanov	22 November 1994 (age 31)	196	86	354	330	Ushkyn-Iskra
21	Mikhail Bobkov	31 August 1996 (age 29)	199	86	340	320	Almaty VC

=== Mexico ===
Head coach:	Jorge Azair
Assistant coach:	Gerardo Iván Contreras Gamez
Doctor(s):	Kethzel Garcia Padron
Physiotherapist(s):	Sergio Iván Hernandez Rangel

N°	Name	Date of birth	Height	Weight	Spike	Block	2016 Club
1	Daniel Vargas	1 September 1986 (age 39)	197	94	340	330	Raision Loimu
2	Iván Arturo Márquez Ramírez	2 January 1992 (age 34)	195	79	312	292	Nuevo Leon
3	Marco Antonio Macias Vargas	12 February 1985 (age 41)	193	86	344	330	Changos de Naranjito
4	Gonzalo Ruiz De La Cruz	28 April 1988 (age 38)	186	87	345	325	IMSS ATN
5	Jesus Rangel	20 September 1980 (age 45)	190	82	337	330	Nuevo Leon
6	Jesus Alberto Perales	22 December 1993 (age 32)	197	88	328	304	Nuevo Leon
7	Jorge Quiñones	13 November 1981 (age 44)	186	80	330	325	Virtus Guanajuato
8	Ignacio Ramirez	17 September 1976 (age 49)	185	83	328	318	Nayarit
9	Carlos Guerra (C)	3 August 1981 (age 44)	196	95	348	335	Chenois Geneve Volleyball
10	Pedro Rangel	16 September 1988 (age 37)	192	85	340	324	Nuevo Leon
11	Jorge Barajas	7 May 1991 (age 34)	188	80	320	317	Colima
12	Jose Martell	21 October 1976 (age 49)	195	85	350	340	IMSS Valle De Mexico
13	Samuel Cordova	13 March 1989 (age 37)	200	89	353	335	Baja California
14	Tomas Aguilera	15 November 1988 (age 37)	202	95	350	340	Chihuahua
16	Miguel Antonio Chávez Pasos	13 May 1996 (age 29)	202	73	335	293	Sonora
17	Nestor Orellana	7 January 1992 (age 34)	192	84	332	327	Nuevo Leon
19	José Mendoza Perdomo	31 May 1993 (age 32)	170	71	290	265	Jalisco
20	Julian Duarte	19 June 1994 (age 31)	200	98	321	302	Nuevo Leon
21	Jose Martinez	23 January 1993 (age 33)	200	100	345	334	Virtus Guanajuato
23	Ridl Alexis Garay Nava	9 June 1997 (age 28)	194	74	326	299	Jalisco
24	Alejandro Moreno	6 September 1994 (age 31)	191	80	338	320	Nuevo Leon

=== Montenegro ===
Head coach:	Slobodan Boškan
Assistant coach:	Vladimir Rackovic
Doctor(s):	Miroslav Kezunovic
Physiotherapist(s):	Vladimir Dragojevic

N°	Name	Date of birth	Height	Weight	Spike	Block	2016 Club
1	Aleksandar Minic	9 November 1986 (age 39)	205	103	347	340	OK Vojvodina
2	Simo Dabovic	9 April 1987 (age 39)	195	93	335	335	Foinikas Syros
3	Luka Babic	7 July 1994 (age 31)	211	103	350	339	Budvanska Rivijera Budva
4	Gojko Cuk	10 October 1988 (age 37)	209	101	345	335	Chaumont VB 52
5	Rajko Strugar	11 April 1995 (age 31)	193	85	330	320	Orange Nassau
6	Vojin Cacic (C)	31 March 1990 (age 36)	203	101	355	340	Al Hojaj
7	Nikola Radonic	30 July 1994 (age 31)	191	78	0	0	OK Borac
8	Nikola Lakcevic	14 July 1995 (age 30)	190	89	315	305	Budvanska Rivijera Budva
9	Marko Bojic	13 November 1988 (age 37)	201	88	355	335	Palembang Bank Sumsel Babel
10	Balsa Radunovic	12 August 1992 (age 33)	205	93	350	330	Al Hilal
11	Bozidar Cuk	13 June 1992 (age 33)	201	97	335	325	Dragons Lugano
12	Slobodan Bojic	11 August 1992 (age 33)	200	92	348	335	TNK Kazchrome
13	Bojan Radovic	27 September 1992 (age 33)	203	100	340	330	OK Budućnost Podgorica
14	Blazo Milic	22 November 1987 (age 38)	210	88	345	335	Orestiada
15	Jovan Delic	28 March 1993 (age 33)	197	84	340	325	Novi Pazar
16	Marko Vukasinovic	30 July 1993 (age 32)	196	88	348	330	Orestiada
17	Ivan Jecmenica	17 March 1990 (age 36)	202	90	350	340	Budvanska Rivijera Budva
18	Milos Culafic	13 August 1986 (age 39)	205	100	360	340	Toulouse
19	Ljubomir Popovic	14 November 1988 (age 37)	182	87	300	295	Jedinstvo BRCKO

=== Puerto Rico ===
Head coach:	Javier Gaspar
Assistant coach:	Abdel Otero
Physiotherapist(s):	Wilfredo Nazario

N°	Name	Date of birth	Height	Weight	Spike	Block	2016 Club
1	Steven Morales	7 April 1992 (age 34)	195	82	346	317	San Sebastian
2	Edgardo Goas	27 January 1989 (age 37)	197	95	345	330	Arecibo
3	Kevin Lopez	24 April 1995 (age 31)	188	68	245	238	National Team
4	Dennis Del Valle	27 January 1989 (age 37)	175	58	300	290	Guaynabo
5	Pedro Nieves	29 June 1993 (age 32)	198	92	312	305	National Team
6	Giovanni Llinas	22 October 1994 (age 31)	195	84	326	314	National Team
7	Arturo Iglesias	22 November 1995 (age 30)	183	68	246	243	National Team
8	Eddie Rivera	16 June 1992 (age 33)	181	69	248	242	Guaynabo
9	Jonathan Martinez Albino	27 October 1993 (age 32)	193	77	306	298	National Team
12	Joseth Irizarry	29 April 1996 (age 30)	186	68	246	242	National Team
13	Pedro Rosario	18 May 1994 (age 31)	189	78	244	238	National Team
14	Brian Negron	15 February 1996 (age 30)	199	88	302	297	National Team
15	Jonathan Rodriguez	16 September 1997 (age 28)	193	82	243	238	National Team
16	Ricardo Archilla	5 November 1991 (age 34)	198	88	342	306	National Team
17	Pedrito Sierra	21 July 1989 (age 36)	196	89	305	298	Fajardo
19	Jair Santiago	24 August 1995 (age 30)	205	86	310	302	National Team
20	Sequiel Sánchez	24 March 1990 (age 36)	191	89	325	305	Naranjito
21	Arnel De Jesus	30 July 1990 (age 35)	186	73	245	239	National Team
22	Josue Rivera	14 April 1992 (age 34)	192	82	335	310	National Team
23	Jose Quinones	2 February 1994 (age 32)	192	78	245	239	National Team
24	Arnel Cabrera Rivera	11 October 1994 (age 31)	189	79	245	239	National Team

=== Qatar ===
Head coach:	Roberto Piazza
Assistant coach:	Massimiliano Glaccdrdi
Physiotherapist(s):	Abdelhafid Semaoui

N°	Name	Date of birth	Height	Weight	Spike	Block	2016 Club
1	Borislav Georgiev	12 May 1992 (age 33)	198	95	340	315	Police SC
2	Mohamed Jumah	14 April 1985 (age 41)	199	70	335	325	Al Arabi
3	Milos Stevanovic	27 September 1988 (age 37)	192	85	320	310	El Jaish
4	Ribeiro Renan	30 December 1989 (age 36)	195	90	330	315	Al Arabi
5	Saad Sulaman	30 June 1987 (age 38)	178	75	290	275	Al Rayyan
6	John Chigbo	4 April 1989 (age 37)	201	95	340	325	POLICE S.C.
7	Bojan Djukic	6 June 1991 (age 34)	193	85	330	315	El Jaish
8	Marko Stevanovic	25 July 1987 (age 38)	185	80	295	275	El Jaish
9	Bairami Ali (C)	15 June 1983 (age 42)	190	87	345	325	Al Rayyan
10	Ndir Sadikh	2 February 1986 (age 40)	198	90	345	330	POLICE S.C.
11	Ahmad Diab	15 February 1990 (age 36)	207	90	349	330	Al Arabi
12	Mubarak Dahi Waleed	1 April 1991 (age 35)	201	92	330	315	Al Rayyan
13	Raimi Wadidie	—	188	80	350	340	Al Sadd
14	Jorge Garcia	31 March 1991 (age 35)	202	90	350	335	Al Arabi
15	Ilija Ivovic	12 November 1990 (age 35)	190	88	330	315	El Jaish
16	Ibrahim Ibrahim	15 January 1985 (age 41)	206	90	360	336	Al Arabi
17	Belal Abunabot	1 January 1991 (age 35)	200	95	355	330	Al Rayyan
18	Andre Luiz Queiroz Franca	—	195	90	323	300	Al Rayyan
19	Birama Faye	—	210	95	350	335	Al Rayyan
20	Thiago De Oliveira Guimarães	7 August 1991 (age 34)	200	90	340	320	Al Arabi
21	Mohammed Abdulrahman	2 October 1984 (age 41)	180	85	290	270	Al Arabi

=== Slovenia ===
Head coach:	Andrea Giani
Assistant coach:	Matteo De Cecco
Doctor(s):	Mile Majstorovic
Physiotherapist(s):	Marko Macuh

N°	Name	Date of birth	Height	Weight	Spike	Block	2016 Club
1	Toncek Stern	14 November 1995 (age 30)	198	95	352	340	Calcit KAMNIK
2	Alen Pajenk	23 April 1986 (age 40)	203	92	366	336	Fenerbahce
3	Žiga Štern	2 January 1994 (age 32)	193	88	346	330	Calcit KAMNIK
4	Miha Bregar	25 October 1993 (age 32)	200	98	345	333	MOK Krka
5	Alen Šket	28 March 1988 (age 38)	205	92	350	336	Top Volley Latina
6	Mitja Gasparini	26 June 1984 (age 41)	202	93	346	333	Paris Volley
7	Matej Kök	11 December 1996 (age 29)	196	96	355	340	Astec Triglav KRANJ
8	Klemen Hribar	17 July 1990 (age 35)	185	85	320	393	Calcit KAMNIK
9	Dejan Vincic	15 September 1986 (age 39)	200	93	354	338	Beauvais
10	Saso Stalekar	3 May 1996 (age 29)	214	98	354	340	Calcit KAMNIK
11	Danijel Koncilja	4 September 1990 (age 35)	201	94	360	340	SK Posojilnica Aich/Dob
12	Jan Klobucar	11 December 1992 (age 33)	196	92	354	345	United Volleys Rhein-Mein
13	Jani Kovacic	14 June 1992 (age 33)	186	83	320	305	AS Cannes
14	Jan Pokeršnik	15 December 1989 (age 36)	199	84	355	325	ACH Volley
15	Mario Koncilja	4 December 1992 (age 33)	201	94	355	330	ACH Volley
16	Gregor Ropret	1 March 1989 (age 37)	192	89	343	325	Hypo Tirol Innsbruck
17	Tine Urnaut (C)	3 September 1988 (age 37)	200	88	365	332	Trentino Volley
18	Klemen Čebulj	21 February 1992 (age 34)	202	96	366	345	Volley Lube
19	Aleš Kök	11 December 1996 (age 29)	198	88	335	308	Astec Triglav KRANJ
20	Diko Puric	2 October 1993 (age 32)	202	93	336	317	ACH Volley
21	Ziga Donik	21 September 1995 (age 30)	191	80	339	312	ACH Volley

=== Chinese Taipei ===
Head coach:	Ke-Chou Chen
Assistant coach:	Cheng, Yi-Hsiang

N°	Name	Date of birth	Height	Weight	Spike	Block	2016 Club
1	Kuo-Chun Lin	11 April 1993 (age 33)	189	72	320	310
2	Hong-Jie Liu	10 November 1993 (age 32)	189	80	327	320
3	Hsing-Kuo Lee	20 September 1995 (age 30)	191	75	315	295
4	Ju-Chien Tai	14 November 1988 (age 37)	181	77	320	310
5	Li-Yi Tung	10 October 1994 (age 31)	165	62	0	0
7	Hung-Min Liu	10 November 1993 (age 32)	191	85	325	315
8	Liang-Hao Chang	7 July 1994 (age 31)	194	86	320	310
9	Tien-Yu Chiang	7 February 1988 (age 38)	196	95	335	325
10	Tsung-Hsuan Wu	9 July 1994 (age 31)	185	75	325	300
11	Chien-Feng Huang	31 December 1990 (age 35)	195	82	345	332
12	Mei-Chung Hsu	16 October 1991 (age 34)	188	90	333	3000
13	Chun-Ching Huang	22 March 1993 (age 33)	196	88	335	330
14	Ming Chun Wang	30 July 1988 (age 37)	188	85	310	300
15	Wen-Chen Hsu	30 June 1996 (age 29)	188	73	310	305
16	Yung-Shun Lin	13 October 1990 (age 35)	172	68	311	198
17	Pei-Hung Huang	17 September 1990 (age 35)	188	74	325	321
19	Chien-Chen Chen (C)	20 November 1989 (age 36)	188	87	338	325
20	Shao-Chieh Chuang	18 October 1994 (age 31)	194	80	330	310
21	Chia-Hsuan Li	6 September 1993 (age 32)	170	66	300	270
22	Hsiu-Chih Shih	24 July 1995 (age 30)	184	77	320	310
23	Hung-Jen Tseng	23 December 1996 (age 29)	190	94	315	310

=== Tunisia ===
Head coach:	Fethi Mkaouar
Assistant coach:	Riadh Hedhili
Doctor(s):	Karim Grindi
Physiotherapist(s):	Hamdi Ben Rais

N°	Name	Date of birth	Height	Weight	Spike	Block	2016 Club
1	Tayeb Korbosli	5 June 1993 (age 32)	188	75	280	270	C O Kelibia
2	Ahmed Kadhi	19 April 1989 (age 37)	199	99	345	318	E.S.Sahel
3	Elyes Garfi	8 June 1993 (age 32)	202	90	350	340	E.S.Tunis
4	Bahri Messaoud	21 June 1991 (age 34)	185	80	320	290	C.S.Sfaxien
5	Oualid Ben Abbes	19 June 1980 (age 45)	186	76	331	308	C.S.Sfaxien
6	Mohamed Ali Ben Othmen Miladi	12 May 1991 (age 34)	188	73	315	289	E.S.Tunis
7	Elyes Karamosli	22 August 1989 (age 36)	198	99	345	320	E.S.Tunis
8	Nabil Miladi	28 February 1988 (age 38)	196	73	355	340	E.S.Tunis
9	Mahdi Ben Cheikh (C)	13 May 1979 (age 46)	184	85	320	305	E.S.Tunis
10	Hamza Nagga	29 May 1990 (age 35)	191	84	326	311	E.S.Sahel
11	Ismail Moalla	30 January 1990 (age 36)	195	84	324	308	El Zamalek SC
12	Anouer Taouerghi	17 August 1983 (age 42)	178	74	302	292	E.S.Sahel
13	Haykel Jerbi	4 April 1988 (age 38)	199	81	280	290	E S Sahel
14	Bilel Ben Hassine	22 June 1983 (age 42)	195	88	330	315	E.S.Tunis
15	Hichem Kaabi	13 September 1986 (age 39)	194	84	360	345	E.S.Tunis
16	Khaled Ben Slimene	14 December 1994 (age 31)	193	78	290	285	C O Kelibia
17	Chokri Jouini	25 April 1989 (age 37)	196	72	355	330	E.S.Tunis
18	Wassim Ben Tara	3 August 1996 (age 29)	199	87	340	320	ASUL Lyon
19	Mohamed Ayech	31 March 1991 (age 35)	198	86	324	310	E.S.Sahel
20	Omar Agrebi	26 August 1992 (age 33)	205	82	325	310	C.S.Sfaxien
21	Karim Brini	1 March 1985 (age 41)	183	79	312	302	SAYDIA

=== Venezuela ===
Head coach:	Vincenzo Nacci
Assistant coach:	Ihosvanny Chambers Hernandez
Doctor(s):	Armando Camara
Physiotherapist(s):	Benny Ednel Sosa

N°	Name	Date of birth	Height	Weight	Spike	Block	2016 Club
1	Regulo Alberto Briceno	13 February 1989 (age 37)	175	85	332	327	Aragua
2	Jhonlenn Cruz Barreto Pena	14 May 1987 (age 38)	185	80	330	325
3	Fernando Gonzalez	30 June 1989 (age 36)	194	84	333	328	Chubut Voley
4	Héctor Mata	27 January 1991 (age 35)	179	77	310	304	Anzoategui
5	Emerson Alexander Rodriguez Gonzalez	2 February 1993 (age 33)	2	96	0	0
6	Carlos Julio Paez Diaz	9 November 1991 (age 34)	192	82	342	337	Carabobo
7	Edson Alberto Valencia Gonzalez	2 December 1987 (age 38)	195	92	330	325	Huracanes
8	Hector Salerno	18 June 1991 (age 34)	196	76	358	351	Aragua
9	José Carrasco	20 May 1989 (age 36)	195	89	345	347	Yaracuy
10	Kervin Pinerua (C)	22 February 1991 (age 35)	191	85	339	334	Miranda
11	Luis Miguel	13 May 1995 (age 30)	200	78	334	330	Distrito Capital
12	Julio Andrez Perez Zerpa	4 July 1995 (age 30)	195	79	338	334	Zulia
13	Jesus Danian Chourio Pirela	2 January 1991 (age 35)	201	88	345	340	Zulia
14	Maximo Antonio Montoya Martine	26 June 1989 (age 36)	198	86	347	343	Apure
15	Roberth Abreu	5 May 1996 (age 29)	200	89	340	333	Yaracuy
16	Andy Agustin Rojas Guevara	2 October 1977 (age 48)	197	95	315	318	Unicaja Almeria
17	Paul Viloria	30 June 1995 (age 30)	201	92	343	338	Distrito Capital
18	Jonathan Quijada	25 September 1995 (age 30)	203	82	346	341	Aragua
19	Willner Enrique Rivas Quijada	2 April 1995 (age 31)	194	81	339	336	Distrito Capital
20	Oscar Enrique Garcia Marquina	16 September 1995 (age 30)	168	76	320	315	Barinas
21	Richard Alexander Yrigoyen Bethancourt	5 February 1995 (age 31)	196	79	335	320	Cojedes
