= Volleyball at the 2010 Asian Games – Men's tournament =

Men at the 2010 Asian Games
- Venue: Guangyao Gymnasium; Zhongda Gymnasium; Guangzhou Gymnasium
- Date: 13–26 November 2010
- Competitors: 216 from 18 nations

Medalists
gold medal	Japan
silver medal	Iran
bronze medal	South Korea

The 2010 Men's Asian Games Volleyball Tournament was the 14th edition of the event, organized by the Asian governing body, the AVC. It was held in Guangzhou, China from November 13 to November 26, 2010.

== Squads ==
Athletes from Kuwait	China	Chinese Taipei	Hong Kong
Abdullah Jasem; Sultan Ahmad; Mohammad Al-Banna; Abdulwahab Al-Jiran; Sultan Khalaf; Ebrahim Safar; Meshal Al-Omar; Ahmad Al-Mulla; Abdullah Bouftain; Mohammad Al-Qattan; Abdullah Al-Enzi; Abdulrahman Al-Otaibi	Bian Hongmin; Yuan Zhi; Zhang Chen; Guo Peng; Liang Chunlong; Zhong Weijun; Cui Jianjun; Jiao Shuai; Chen Ping; Shen Qiong; Li Runming; Ren Qi	Huang Chien-feng; Wen Shen-ming; Wang Ming-chun; Chiang Tien-yu; Chien Chang-fu; Chen Chien-chen; Chien Wei-lun; Peng Wei-ming; Lu Ching-chuan; Tsai Han-yi; Huang Pei-hung; Tai Chia-jui	Chung Wai Wing; Jacky Kwong; Keung Chun Keung; Cheng Chun Man; Alex Chan; Ko Yiu Hung; Fok Shu Wing; Kwok Chung Kan; Hui Pui Tak; Wong Ka Wai; Chan Kam Yin; Yu Hing Lung
India	Indonesia	Iran	Japan
Guttikonda Pradeep; Vibin George; Sivasubramanian Kanagaraj; Sanjay Kumar; Balwinder Singh; Sube Singh; Naveen Raja Jacob; Navjit Singh; Gurchand Singh; Mohan Ukkrapandian; Gurinder Singh; P. S. Srikanth	Adam; Septiohadi; Mahfud Nurcahyadi; Bagus Wahyu Ardyanto; Heryanto; Ma'ruf Herlambang; Didi Irwadi; Ahmad Grahari; Antho Bertiyawan; Veleg Dhany Ristan; Ramzil Huda; Muhammad Riviansyah	Adel Gholami; Mojtaba Attar; Saeid Marouf; Mohammad Mousavi; Hamzeh Zarini; Alireza Nadi; Mohsen Andalib; Farhad Nazari Afshar; Mehdi Mahdavi; Arash Keshavarzi; Mohammad Mohammadkazem; Arash Kamalvand	Akio Nagae; Takeshi Nagano; Naoya Suga; Daisuke Usami; Yoshifumi Suzuki; Yuya Ageba; Takaaki Tomimatsu; Kota Yamamura; Kunihiro Shimizu; Tatsuya Fukuzawa; Yusuke Ishijima; Yuta Yoneyama
Kazakhstan	Mongolia	Myanmar	Pakistan
Yuriy Stulov; Asset Bazarkulov; Anton Yudin; Alexandr Stolnikov; Sergey Kuznetsov; Dmitriy Gorbatkov; Marat Imangaliyev; Vitaliy Mironenko; Nodirkhan Kadirkhanov; Vitaliy Erdshtein; Sergey Yembulayev; Vitaliy Vorivodin	Otgonbayaryn Ochirbat; Renchingiin Khangai; Chuluunbatyn Otgonbayar; Dashpuntsagiin Bazarvaani; Erdenebilegiin Batkhüü; Erdene-Ochiryn Enkhmönkh; Enebatyn Mönkhsaikhan; Mönkhbatyn Mönkh-Orgil; Erdenebatyn Saikhanbaatar; Erdenebilegiin Sainbileg; Ganbatyn Erdembileg; Erdenebatyn Gan-Erdene	U Ye Myint; Kyaw Kyaw Htwe; Kyaw Swa Win; Win Tun Oo; Sai Nyi Lay; Kyaw Shwe; Aung Ko Latt; Aung Thu; Do Mae Ni Ko; Ye Yint Tun; Aung Myat Tun; Chit Po Po	Mohib Rasool; Farooq Khan; Pir Bakhsh Yasin; Asif Nadeem; Zaheer Abbas; Muhammad Ismail Khan; Aimal Khan; Naseer Ahmed; Muhammad Razzaq; Shujah Abbas Naqvi; Munir Khan; Aamir Sharif
Qatar	Saudi Arabia	South Korea	Thailand
Saeed Faraj Al-Obaidan; Jumah Faraj; Ali Hassan Asadi; Sulaiman Saeed; John Chigbo; Abdulrashid Owail; Ali Ishaq Bairami; Mohammed Al-Beshri; Mubarak Dahi; Ali Hamid Yagoub; Ibrahim Mohammed; Saeed Juma Al-Hitmi	Majed Al-Jahani; Ahmed Al-Bakhit; Naif Al-Buhassoun; Yahya Hanash; Asaad Azouz; Khalil Hajji; Ibrahim Al-Harbi; Thamer Al-Dossari; Ismail Al-Khaibari; Masfer Al-Bishi; Ibrahim Majrashi; Yasser Al-Makawni	Shin Young-soo; Han Sun-soo; Kwon Young-min; Moon Sung-min; Yeo Oh-hyun; Kim Hak-min; Kim Yo-han; Ko Hee-jin; Park Chul-woo; Suk Jin-wook; Ha Hyun-yong; Shin Yung-suk	Jirayu Raksakaew; Montri Vaenpradab; Wanchai Tabwises; Shotivat Tivsuwan; Yuranan Buadang; Kittikun Sriutthawong; Piyarat Toontupthai; Pisanu Harnkhomtun; Pongsakorn Nimawan; Somporn Wannaprapa; Kitsada Somkane; Saranchit Charoensuk
Turkmenistan	Vietnam		
Gurbanmuhammet Gylyçdurdyýew; Berdimämmet Täçgeldiýew; Maksat Ymamgulyýew; Timur Akmyradow; Merdan Azimow; Batyr Soýunow; Oleg Owodkow; Arslan Ýazgulyýew; Gurban Ýazgulyýew; Ruslan Artykow; Mämed Batyrow; Guwanç Karaýew	Huỳnh Văn Tuấn; Lưu Đình Toàn; Giang Văn Đức; Lê Bình Giang; Hoàng Văn Phương; Ngô Văn Kiều; Lê Quang Khánh; Phạm Ngọc Kiên; Phạm Thái Hưng; Bùi Văn Hải; Nguyễn Xuân Thành; Phạm Minh Tuấn		

== Results ==
All times are China Standard Time (UTC+08:00)

=== Preliminary ===
==== Group A ====
Pos	Team	Pld	W	L	Pts	SPW	SPL	SPR	SW	SL	SR	Qualification
1	China	3	3	0	6	268	220	1.218	9	2	4.500	Second round / Group E–F
2	Thailand	3	2	1	5	305	300	1.017	7	7	1.000	Second round / Group E–F
3	Pakistan	3	1	2	4	283	308	0.919	6	8	0.750	Second round / Group G–H
4	Chinese Taipei	3	0	3	3	254	282	0.901	4	9	0.444	Second round / Group G–H

Source: Results

Date	Time	Venue		Score		Set 1	Set 2	Set 3	Set 4	Set 5	Total	Report
13 Nov	18:00	G-yao	Chinese Taipei	2–3	Thailand	23–25	25–17	25–21	13–25	9–15	95–103	
13 Nov	20:00	G-yao	China	3–1	Pakistan	20–25	25–13	25–19	25–15		95–72	
14 Nov	16:00	G-yao	Pakistan	2–3	Thailand	19–25	30–28	20–25	25–18	13–15	107–111	
14 Nov	20:00	G-yao	China	3–0	Chinese Taipei	25–18	25–18	25–21			75–57	
16 Nov	16:00	G-yao	Chinese Taipei	2–3	Pakistan	18–25	25–21	25–18	22–25	12–15	102–104	Report
17 Nov	18:00	G-yao	China	3–1	Thailand	25–19	21–25	25–22	27–25		98–91	Report

==== Group B ====
Pos	Team	Pld	W	L	Pts	SPW	SPL	SPR	SW	SL	SR	Qualification
1	South Korea	3	3	0	6	225	148	1.520	9	0	MAX	Second round / Group E–F
2	India	3	2	1	5	232	222	1.045	6	4	1.500	Second round / Group E–F
3	Kazakhstan	3	1	2	4	236	252	0.937	4	7	0.571	Second round / Group G–H
4	Vietnam	3	0	3	3	175	246	0.711	1	9	0.111	Second round / Group G–H

Source: Results

Date	Time	Venue		Score		Set 1	Set 2	Set 3	Set 4	Set 5	Total	Report
13 Nov	16:00	G-yao	South Korea	3–0	Vietnam	25–12	25–10	25–16			75–38	
14 Nov	18:00	G-yao	India	3–1	Kazakhstan	24–26	25–23	25–18	25–21		99–88	
15 Nov	16:00	G-yao	Vietnam	1–3	Kazakhstan	19–25	25–21	11–25	23–25		78–96	
15 Nov	18:00	G-yao	South Korea	3–0	India	25–19	25–20	25–19			75–58	
16 Nov	18:00	G-yao	India	3–0	Vietnam	25–20	25–16	25–23			75–59	Report
17 Nov	16:00	G-yao	Kazakhstan	0–3	South Korea	16–25	14–25	22–25			52–75	Report

==== Group C ====
Pos	Team	Pld	W	L	Pts	SPW	SPL	SPR	SW	SL	SR	Qualification
1	Iran	4	4	0	8	306	214	1.430	12	0	MAX	Second round / Group E–F
2	Saudi Arabia	4	3	1	7	331	307	1.078	9	5	1.800	Second round / Group E–F
3	Indonesia	4	2	2	6	336	334	1.006	7	8	0.875	Second round / Group G–H
4	Turkmenistan	4	1	3	5	302	329	0.918	5	9	0.556	Second round / Group G–H
5	Mongolia	4	0	4	4	231	322	0.717	1	12	0.083	

Source: Results

Date	Time	Venue		Score		Set 1	Set 2	Set 3	Set 4	Set 5	Total	Report
13 Nov	14:00	Zhong.	Indonesia	3–2	Turkmenistan	20–25	26–24	26–28	25–21	15–12	112–110	
13 Nov	16:00	Zhong.	Iran	3–0	Mongolia	25–12	25–9	25–13			75–34	
14 Nov	18:00	Zhong.	Turkmenistan	0–3	Iran	10–25	17–25	27–29			54–79	
14 Nov	20:00	Zhong.	Saudi Arabia	3–1	Indonesia	19–25	25–19	25–22	25–22		94–88	
15 Nov	14:00	Zhong.	Iran	3–0	Saudi Arabia	25–20	25–20	27–25			77–65	
15 Nov	16:00	Zhong.	Mongolia	0–3	Turkmenistan	19–25	21–25	23–25			63–75	
16 Nov	18:00	Zhong.	Indonesia	0–3	Iran	15–25	23–25	23–25			61–75	Report
16 Nov	20:00	Zhong.	Saudi Arabia	3–1	Mongolia	25–15	22–25	25–19	25–20		97–79	Report
17 Nov	14:00	Zhong.	Mongolia	0–3	Indonesia	22–25	17–25	16–25			55–75	Report
17 Nov	16:00	Zhong.	Turkmenistan	0–3	Saudi Arabia	18–25	23–25	22–25			63–75	Report

==== Group D ====
Pos	Team	Pld	W	L	Pts	SPW	SPL	SPR	SW	SL	SR	Qualification
1	Japan	4	4	0	8	307	186	1.651	12	0	MAX	Second round / Group E–F
2	Qatar	4	3	1	7	323	277	1.166	9	5	1.800	Second round / Group E–F
3	Athletes from Kuwait	4	2	2	6	314	312	1.006	8	7	1.143	Second round / Group G–H
4	Myanmar	4	1	3	5	238	299	0.796	4	9	0.444	Second round / Group G–H
5	Hong Kong	4	0	4	4	192	300	0.640	0	12	0.000	

Source: Results

Date	Time	Venue		Score		Set 1	Set 2	Set 3	Set 4	Set 5	Total	Report
13 Nov	18:00	Zhong.	Myanmar	3–0	Hong Kong	25–21	25–17	25–13			75–51	
13 Nov	20:00	Zhong.	Athletes from Kuwait	2–3	Qatar	25–20	18–25	12–25	26–24	12–15	93–109	
14 Nov	14:00	Zhong.	Hong Kong	0–3	Athletes from Kuwait	17–25	18–25	16–25			51–75	
14 Nov	16:00	Zhong.	Japan	3–0	Myanmar	25–12	25–14	25–9			75–35	
15 Nov	18:00	Zhong.	Athletes from Kuwait	0–3	Japan	19–25	17–25	12–25			48–75	
15 Nov	20:00	Zhong.	Qatar	3–0	Hong Kong	25–17	25–19	25–15			75–51	
16 Nov	14:00	Zhong.	Myanmar	1–3	Athletes from Kuwait	19–25	22–25	25–23	11–25		77–98	Report
16 Nov	16:00	Zhong.	Japan	3–0	Qatar	25–19	25–15	32–30			82–64	Report
17 Nov	18:00	Zhong.	Qatar	3–0	Myanmar	25–15	25–18	25–18			75–51	Report
17 Nov	20:00	Zhong.	Hong Kong	0–3	Japan	11–25	16–25	12–25			39–75	Report

=== Second round ===
- The results and the points of the matches between the same teams that were already played during the preliminary round shall be taken into account for the second round.

==== Group E ====
Pos	Team	Pld	W	L	Pts	SPW	SPL	SPR	SW	SL	SR	Qualification
1	Iran	3	3	0	6	231	189	1.222	9	0	MAX	Quarterfinals
2	China	3	2	1	5	234	220	1.064	6	4	1.500	Quarterfinals
3	Thailand	3	1	2	4	263	288	0.913	4	8	0.500	Quarterfinals
4	Saudi Arabia	3	0	3	3	230	261	0.881	2	9	0.222	Quarterfinals

Source: Results

Date	Time	Venue		Score		Set 1	Set 2	Set 3	Set 4	Set 5	Total	Report
19 Nov	18:00	Zhong.	Iran	3–0	Thailand	25–17	27–25	25–21			77–63	Report
19 Nov	20:00	Zhong.	China	3–0	Saudi Arabia	25–20	25–15	25–17			75–52	Report
20 Nov	18:00	Zhong.	Thailand	3–2	Saudi Arabia	25–23	27–25	20–25	20–25	17–15	109–113	Report
20 Nov	20:00	Zhong.	China	0–3	Iran	17–25	19–25	25–27			61–77	Report

==== Group F ====
Pos	Team	Pld	W	L	Pts	SPW	SPL	SPR	SW	SL	SR	Qualification
1	South Korea	3	3	0	6	246	207	1.188	9	1	9.000	Quarterfinals
2	India	3	2	1	5	245	228	1.075	6	5	1.200	Quarterfinals
3	Japan	3	1	2	4	280	272	1.029	6	6	1.000	Quarterfinals
4	Qatar	3	0	3	3	168	232	0.724	0	9	0.000	Quarterfinals

Source: Results

Date	Time	Venue		Score		Set 1	Set 2	Set 3	Set 4	Set 5	Total	Report
19 Nov	14:00	Zhong.	South Korea	3–0	Qatar	25–16	25–22	25–18			75–56	Report
19 Nov	16:00	Zhong.	Japan	2–3	India	20–25	19–25	25–21	28–26	13–15	105–112	Report
20 Nov	14:00	Zhong.	India	3–0	Qatar	25–15	25–13	25–20			75–48	Report
20 Nov	16:00	Zhong.	South Korea	3–1	Japan	25–23	21–25	25–23	25–22		96–93	Report

==== Group G ====
Pos	Team	Pld	W	L	Pts	SPW	SPL	SPR	SW	SL	SR	Qualification
1	Pakistan	3	3	0	6	289	273	1.059	9	4	2.250	Placement 9–12
2	Chinese Taipei	3	2	1	5	252	206	1.223	8	3	2.667	Placement 9–12
3	Indonesia	3	1	2	4	275	293	0.939	5	8	0.625	Placement 13–16
4	Turkmenistan	3	0	3	3	220	264	0.833	2	9	0.222	Placement 13–16

Source: Results

Date	Time	Venue		Score		Set 1	Set 2	Set 3	Set 4	Set 5	Total	Report
19 Nov	14:00	G-yao	Pakistan	3–0	Turkmenistan	25–19	25–19	27–25			77–63	Report
19 Nov	16:00	G-yao	Indonesia	0–3	Chinese Taipei	18–25	23–25	14–25			55–75	Report
20 Nov	14:00	G-yao	Chinese Taipei	3–0	Turkmenistan	25–17	25–16	25–15			75–48	Report
20 Nov	16:00	G-yao	Pakistan	3–2	Indonesia	25–22	23–25	20–25	25–23	15–13	108–108	Report

==== Group H ====
Pos	Team	Pld	W	L	Pts	SPW	SPL	SPR	SW	SL	SR	Qualification
1	Kazakhstan	3	3	0	6	266	198	1.343	9	2	4.500	Placement 9–12
2	Athletes from Kuwait	3	2	1	5	275	270	1.019	7	6	1.167	Placement 9–12
3	Myanmar	3	1	2	4	199	233	0.854	4	6	0.667	Placement 13–16
4	Vietnam	3	0	3	3	236	275	0.858	3	9	0.333	Placement 13–16

Source: Results

Date	Time	Venue		Score		Set 1	Set 2	Set 3	Set 4	Set 5	Total	Report
19 Nov	18:00	G-yao	Kazakhstan	3–0	Myanmar	25–14	25–11	25–22			75–47	Report
19 Nov	20:00	G-yao	Athletes from Kuwait	3–2	Vietnam	20–25	25–23	25–16	19–25	15–9	104–98	Report
20 Nov	18:00	G-yao	Vietnam	0–3	Myanmar	21–25	21–25	18–25			60–75	Report
20 Nov	20:00	G-yao	Kazakhstan	3–1	Athletes from Kuwait	20–25	25–20	25–11	25–17		95–73	Report

=== Placement 13–16 ===
Placement 13–16
21 November
Indonesia	3
Vietnam	2
21 November
Myanmar	3
Turkmenistan	0

Placement 13th–14th
23 November
Indonesia	3
Myanmar	1
Placement 15th–16th
23 November
Vietnam	1
Turkmenistan	3

==== Semifinals ====
Date	Time	Venue		Score		Set 1	Set 2	Set 3	Set 4	Set 5	Total	Report
21 Nov	14:00	G-yao	Indonesia	3–2	Vietnam	22–25	22–25	25–20	25–23	15–12	109–105	Report
21 Nov	16:00	G-yao	Myanmar	3–0	Turkmenistan	28–26	25–15	25–14			78–55	Report

==== Placement 15th–16th ====
Date	Time	Venue		Score		Set 1	Set 2	Set 3	Set 4	Set 5	Total	Report
23 Nov	14:00	Zhong.	Vietnam	1–3	Turkmenistan	16–25	19–25	25–20	23–25		83–95	Report

==== Placement 13th–14th ====
Date	Time	Venue		Score		Set 1	Set 2	Set 3	Set 4	Set 5	Total	Report
23 Nov	16:00	Zhong.	Indonesia	3–1	Myanmar	19–25	25–18	25–22	25–20		94–85	Report

=== Placement 9–12 ===
Placement 9–12
21 November
Pakistan	3
Athletes from Kuwait	0
21 November
Kazakhstan	3
Chinese Taipei	2

Placement 9th–10th
23 November
Pakistan	0
Kazakhstan	3
Placement 11th–12th
23 November
Athletes from Kuwait	0
Chinese Taipei	3

==== Semifinals ====
Date	Time	Venue		Score		Set 1	Set 2	Set 3	Set 4	Set 5	Total	Report
21 Nov	18:00	G-yao	Pakistan	3–0	Athletes from Kuwait	27–25	25–21	25–21			77–67	Report
21 Nov	20:00	G-yao	Kazakhstan	3–2	Chinese Taipei	26–24	25–27	25–22	23–25	23–21	122–119	Report

==== Placement 11th–12th ====
Date	Time	Venue		Score		Set 1	Set 2	Set 3	Set 4	Set 5	Total	Report
23 Nov	18:00	Zhong.	Athletes from Kuwait	0–3	Chinese Taipei	23–25	18–25	22–25			63–75	Report

==== Placement 9th–10th ====
Date	Time	Venue		Score		Set 1	Set 2	Set 3	Set 4	Set 5	Total	Report
23 Nov	20:00	Zhong.	Pakistan	0–3	Kazakhstan	21–25	22–25	29–31			72–81	Report

=== Final round ===
Quarterfinals
21 November
South Korea	3
Saudi Arabia	0
21 November
China	0
Japan	3
21 November
Iran	3
Qatar	1
21 November
India	0
Thailand	3

Semifinals
24 November
South Korea	2
Japan	3
24 November
Iran	3
Thailand	0

Gold medal match
26 November
Japan	3
Iran	1
Bronze medal match
26 November
South Korea	3
Thailand	0

Placement 5–8
24 November
Qatar	0
India	3
24 November
Saudi Arabia	0
China	3

Placement 5th–6th
26 November
India	0
China	3
Placement 7th–8th
26 November
Qatar	0
Saudi Arabia	3

==== Quarterfinals ====
Date	Time	Venue		Score		Set 1	Set 2	Set 3	Set 4	Set 5	Total	Report
21 Nov	14:00	Zhong.	China	0–3	Japan	14–25	22–25	23–25			59–75	Report
21 Nov	16:00	Zhong.	India	0–3	Thailand	20–25	23–25	22–25			65–75	Report
21 Nov	18:00	Zhong.	South Korea	3–0	Saudi Arabia	25–19	25–19	25–17			75–55	Report
21 Nov	20:00	Zhong.	Iran	3–1	Qatar	16–25	25–16	25–23	25–14		91–78	Report

==== Placement 5–8 ====
Date	Time	Venue		Score		Set 1	Set 2	Set 3	Set 4	Set 5	Total	Report
24 Nov	14:00	G-yao	Qatar	0–3	India	23–25	16–25	17–25			56–75	Report
24 Nov	16:00	G-yao	Saudi Arabia	0–3	China	20–25	21–25	15–25			56–75	Report

==== Semifinals ====
Date	Time	Venue		Score		Set 1	Set 2	Set 3	Set 4	Set 5	Total	Report
24 Nov	18:00	G-yao	South Korea	2–3	Japan	27–25	25–21	19–25	20–25	12–15	103–111	Report
24 Nov	20:00	G-yao	Iran	3–0	Thailand	25–16	25–21	25–16			75–53	Report

==== Placement 7th–8th ====
Date	Time	Venue		Score		Set 1	Set 2	Set 3	Set 4	Set 5	Total	Report
26 Nov	18:00	Zhong.	Qatar	0–3	Saudi Arabia	22–25	26–28	26–28			74–81	Report

==== Placement 5th–6th ====
Date	Time	Venue		Score		Set 1	Set 2	Set 3	Set 4	Set 5	Total	Report
26 Nov	20:00	Zhong.	India	0–3	China	18–25	17–25	18–25			53–75	Report

==== Bronze medal match ====
Date	Time	Venue		Score		Set 1	Set 2	Set 3	Set 4	Set 5	Total	Report
26 Nov	19:00	G-zhou	South Korea	3–0	Thailand	25–19	25–17	28–26			78–62	Report

==== Gold medal match ====
Date	Time	Venue		Score		Set 1	Set 2	Set 3	Set 4	Set 5	Total	Report
26 Nov	21:00	G-zhou	Japan	3–1	Iran	25–19	25–13	23–25	25–18		98–75	Report

== Final standing ==
Rank	Team	Pld	W	L
1st place, gold medalist(s)	Japan	9	7	2
2nd place, silver medalist(s)	Iran	9	8	1
3rd place, bronze medalist(s)	South Korea	8	7	1
4	Thailand	8	4	4
5	China	8	6	2
6	India	8	5	3
7	Saudi Arabia	9	4	5
8	Qatar	9	3	6
9	Kazakhstan	7	5	2
10	Pakistan	7	4	3
11	Chinese Taipei	7	3	4
12	Athletes from Kuwait	8	3	5
13	Indonesia	8	4	4
14	Myanmar	8	3	5
15	Turkmenistan	8	2	6
16	Vietnam	7	0	7
17	Hong Kong	4	0	4
17	Mongolia	4	0	4
