= 2016 Memorial of Hubert Jerzy Wagner squads =

This article shows the rosters of all participating teams at the 2016 Memorial of Hubert Jerzy Wagner in Kraków, Poland.

== Bulgaria ==
The following is the Bulgarian roster in the 2016 Memorial of Hubert Jerzy Wagner.

Head coach: (Bulgaria) Plamen Konstantinov

No.	Name	Date of birth	Height	Weight	Spike	Block	2016 club
	Trifon Lapkov	1 February 1996	1.98 m (6 ft 6 in)	93 kg (205 lb)	335 cm (132 in)	310 cm (120 in)	(Bulgaria) VC Montana
	Metodi Ananiev	17 February 1986	2.03 m (6 ft 8 in)	100 kg (220 lb)	363 cm (143 in)	345 cm (136 in)	(Bulgaria) VC Levski Sofia
	Georgi Manchev	20 July 1990	1.98 m (6 ft 6 in)	88 kg (194 lb)	345 cm (136 in)	335 cm (132 in)	(Bulgaria) VC Dobrudzha 07 Dobrich
	Svetoslav Gotsev	31 August 1990	2.05 m (6 ft 9 in)	97 kg (214 lb)	358 cm (141 in)	335 cm (132 in)	(Iran) Shahrdari Tabriz VC
	Todor Skrimov	9 January 1990	1.92 m (6 ft 4 in)	82 kg (181 lb)	340 cm (130 in)	310 cm (120 in)	(Italy) Power Volley Milano
	Georgi Seganov	10 June 1993	1.98 m (6 ft 6 in)	83 kg (183 lb)	335 cm (132 in)	325 cm (128 in)	(Bulgaria) VC CSKA Sofia
	Branimir Grozdanov	21 May 1994	1.98 m (6 ft 6 in)	88 kg (194 lb)	338 cm (133 in)	327 cm (129 in)	(Turkey) Beşiktaş Istanbul
	Viktor Yosifov	16 October 1985	2.04 m (6 ft 8 in)	100 kg (220 lb)	350 cm (140 in)	340 cm (130 in)	(Italy) Ninfa Latina
	Petar Karakashev	11 February 1991	1.83 m (6 ft 0 in)	0 kg (0 lb)	326 cm (128 in)	308 cm (121 in)	(Bulgaria) VC Pirin Razlog
	Teodor Todorov	1 September 1989	2.08 m (6 ft 10 in)	94 kg (207 lb)	365 cm (144 in)	345 cm (136 in)	(Switzerland) PV Lugano
	Vladislav Ivanov	14 March 1987	1.88 m (6 ft 2 in)	80 kg (180 lb)	320 cm (130 in)	310 cm (120 in)	(France) ASUL Lyon Volley
	Nikolay Penchev	22 May 1992	1.96 m (6 ft 5 in)	85 kg (187 lb)	341 cm (134 in)	320 cm (130 in)	(Poland) Asseco Resovia Rzeszów
	Tsvetan Sokolov	31 December 1989	2.07 m (6 ft 9 in)	108 kg (238 lb)	362 cm (143 in)	330 cm (130 in)	(Turkey) Halkbank Ankara
	Alex Grozdanov	28 March 1998	2.06 m (6 ft 9 in)	0 kg (0 lb)	0 cm (0 in)	0 cm (0 in)	(Bulgaria) VC Dobrudzha 07 Dobrich

== Poland ==
The following is the Polish roster in the 2016 Memorial of Hubert Jerzy Wagner.

Head coach: (France) Stéphane Antiga

No.	Name	Date of birth	Height	Weight	Spike	Block	2016 club
1	Piotr Nowakowski	18 December 1987	2.05 m (6 ft 9 in)	90 kg (200 lb)	355 cm (140 in)	340 cm (130 in)	(Poland) Asseco Resovia Rzeszów
3	Dawid Konarski	31 August 1989	1.98 m (6 ft 6 in)	101 kg (223 lb)	353 cm (139 in)	335 cm (132 in)	(Poland) ZAKSA Kędzierzyn-Koźle
6	Bartosz Kurek	29 August 1988	2.07 m (6 ft 9 in)	104 kg (229 lb)	375 cm (148 in)	340 cm (130 in)	(Poland) Asseco Resovia Rzeszów
7	Karol Kłos	8 August 1989	2.01 m (6 ft 7 in)	83 kg (183 lb)	357 cm (141 in)	326 cm (128 in)	(Poland) PGE Skra Bełchatów
11	Fabian Drzyzga	3 January 1990	1.96 m (6 ft 5 in)	90 kg (200 lb)	325 cm (128 in)	304 cm (120 in)	(Poland) Asseco Resovia Rzeszów
12	Grzegorz Łomacz	1 October 1987	1.87 m (6 ft 2 in)	81 kg (179 lb)	336 cm (132 in)	309 cm (122 in)	(Poland) Cuprum Lubin
13	Michał Kubiak (C)	23 February 1988	1.91 m (6 ft 3 in)	80 kg (180 lb)	328 cm (129 in)	312 cm (123 in)	(Turkey) Halkbank Ankara
15	Piotr Gacek	16 September 1978	1.85 m (6 ft 1 in)	80 kg (180 lb)	328 cm (129 in)	305 cm (120 in)	(Poland) Lotos Trefl Gdańsk
17	Paweł Zatorski	21 June 1990	1.84 m (6 ft 0 in)	73 kg (161 lb)	328 cm (129 in)	304 cm (120 in)	(Poland) ZAKSA Kędzierzyn-Koźle
18	Marcin Możdżonek	9 February 1985	2.11 m (6 ft 11 in)	93 kg (205 lb)	358 cm (141 in)	338 cm (133 in)	(Poland) Cuprum Lubin
20	Mateusz Mika	21 January 1991	2.06 m (6 ft 9 in)	86 kg (190 lb)	352 cm (139 in)	320 cm (130 in)	(Poland) Lotos Trefl Gdańsk
21	Rafał Buszek	28 April 1987	1.94 m (6 ft 4 in)	81 kg (179 lb)	345 cm (136 in)	327 cm (129 in)	(Poland) ZAKSA Kędzierzyn-Koźle
23	Mateusz Bieniek	5 April 1994	2.10 m (6 ft 11 in)	98 kg (216 lb)	351 cm (138 in)	329 cm (130 in)	(Poland) Effector Kielce
25	Artur Szalpuk	20 March 1995	2.02 m (6 ft 8 in)	92 kg (203 lb)	348 cm (137 in)	325 cm (128 in)	(Poland) Cerrad Czarni Radom
