= Bregar =

Bregar is a surname. Notable people with the surname include:

- Drago Bregar (1952–1977), Slovene mountaineer
- John Bregar (born 1985), Canadian actor
- Miha Bregar (born 1993), Slovene volleyball player
- Uroš Bregar (born 1979), Slovene handball coach
