= Nursultan =

Nursultan (Kazakh: Нұрсұлтан, Nūrsūltan, [no̙ɾso̙ɫtɑn]) is a Kazakh male name of Arabic origin. Nur sultan can be literally translated as "radiant sultan", "the sultan of sunlight" in Arabic.

== People ==
- Nursultan Nazarbayev (born 1940), president of Kazakhstan from 1990 to 2019
- Nursultan Belgibayev (born 1991), Kazakhstani ice hockey player
- Nursultan Mamayev (born 1993), Kazakhstani taekwondo practitioner
- Nursultan Bimurza (born 1994), Kazakhstani volleyball player

== See also ==
- Nur-Sultan (Kazakh: Нұр-Сұлтан, Nūr-Sūltan), a city in Kazakhstan previously and currently known as Astana
- Nursultan Nazarbayev International Airport, Kazakhstan's second busiest airport
