= Stolnikov =

Stolnikov (masculine, Russian: Стольников) or Stolnikova (feminine, Russian: Стольникова) is a Russian surname. Notable people with the surname include:

- Alexandr Stolnikov (born 1988), Kazakh volleyball player
- Vladimir Stolnikov (1934–1990), Russian boxer
