= Pennanen =

Pennanen is a Finnish surname. Notable people with the surname include:

- Pekka Pennanen (1872–1960), Finnish politician
- Martti Pennanen (1923–2010), Finnish film and stage actor
- Petteri Pennanen (born 1990), Finnish football player
- Eetu Pennanen (born 1992), Finnish volleyball player
