= Peter Kasper =

Peter Kasper can refer to:

- Peter Kasper (ice hockey) (born 1974), Austrian ice hockey player
- Peter Kasper (volleyball) (born 1985), Slovak volleyball player
