= Shotivat Tivsuwan =

Thai volleyball player (born 1986)

Personal information
- Full name: Shotivat Tivsuwan
- Nickname: Chai
- Nationality: Thailand
- Born: 20 July 1986 (age 40)
- Hometown: Chaiyaphum, Thailand
- Height: 1.90 m (6 ft 3 in)
- Weight: 76 kg (168 lb)

Volleyball information
- Position: Middle Blocker
- Number: 6

National team
2008–2011	Thailand
Honours
Men's volleyball
Representing Thailand
Southeast Asian Games
Silver medal – second place	2009 Vientiane	Team
Gold medal – first place	2011 Palembang/Jakarta	Team

Shotivat Tivsuwan (Thai: โชติวัฒน์ ติ้วสุวรรณ; born 20 July 1986) is a retired Thai male volleyball player. He was part of the Thailand men's national volleyball team. He won the silver medal at the 2009 Southeast Asian Games. He participated at the 2010 Asian Games.

== Career ==
Shotivat played with the Thai club Federbrau in 2010. For the 2016, he moved to NK Fitness Samutsakhon

== Clubs ==
- (Thailand) Chaiyaphum (2006)
- (Thailand) Federbrau (2010)
- (Thailand) Kasetsart (2013–2016)
- (Thailand) NK Fitness Samutsakhon (2016–2017)
- (Thailand) Visakha (2018–2019)

== Award ==
=== Individual ===
- 2006 Thailand League – "Best Middle Blocker"
- 2006 Thailand League – "Best Serve"

=== Clubs ===
- 2014 Thai-Denmark Super League - Champion, with Kasetsart
- 2017 Thai-Denmark Super League - Bronze medal, with NK Fitness Samutsakhon
- 2018 Thai-Denmark Super League - Runner-up, with Visakha
