= Klemen Hribar =

Slovenian volleyball player (born 1990)

Personal information
- Nationality: Slovenian
- Born: 17 July 1990 (age 36); Ljubljana
- Height: 1.86 m (6 ft 1 in)
- Weight: 87 kg (192 lb)
- Spike: 317 cm (125 in)
- Block: 302 cm (119 in)

Volleyball information
- Position: Libero
- Current club: Calcit Kamnik
- Number: 2

Career
Years	Teams
2011–	Calcit Kamnik

National team
2015–	Slovenia
- Last updated: 15 March 2017

Klemen Hribar (born 17 July 1990) is a Slovenian male volleyball player. He is part of the Slovenia men's national volleyball team and plays the position of Libero. He competed at multiple events, the first of which was the 2006–07 Youth European Championships. Most recently, Hribar competed at the 2015 Men's European Volleyball Championship. At club level, he plays for Calcit Kamnik.

== See also ==
- Slovenia men's national volleyball team
