= Almaz Issin =

Kazakhstani volleyball player (born 1990)

Personal information
- Nationality: Kazakhstani
- Born: 28 May 1990 (age 36)
- Height: 194 cm (6 ft 4 in)
- Weight: 77 kg (170 lb)
- Spike: 345 cm (136 in)
- Block: 335 cm (132 in)

Volleyball information
- Number: 10 (national team)

Career
Years	Teams
2015	Pavlodar Vc

National team
2015	Kazakhstan

Almaz Issin (born 28 May 1990) is a Kazakhstani male volleyball player. He is part of the Kazakhstan men's national volleyball team. On club level he plays for Pavlodar Vc.
