= Arturo Iglesias =

Guatemalan sports shooter

Personal information
- Nationality: Guatemalan
- Born: 3 July 1951 (age 73)

Sport
- Sport: Sports shooting

Arturo Iglesias (born 3 July 1951) is a Guatemalan sports shooter. He competed at the 1976 Summer Olympics, the 1980 Summer Olympics and the 1984 Summer Olympics.
