= Drago Bregar =

Slovenian mountaineer

- Born: 23 August 1952; Višnja Gora, Yugoslavia
- Died: 10 July 1977 (aged 24); Gasherbrum I, Pakistan
- Occupation: Mountaineer

Drago Bregar (23 August 1952 – 10 July 1977) was a Slovenian mountaineer.

Drago Bregar was the first Yugoslav death in the Himalayas. In the summer of 1977, he was a member of a Slovenian expedition in Karakoram, that climbed a new route on Gasherbrum I. (8080 m, 26510 ft). Ljubljana branch of the Alpine Association of Slovenia is named after Drago Bregar.

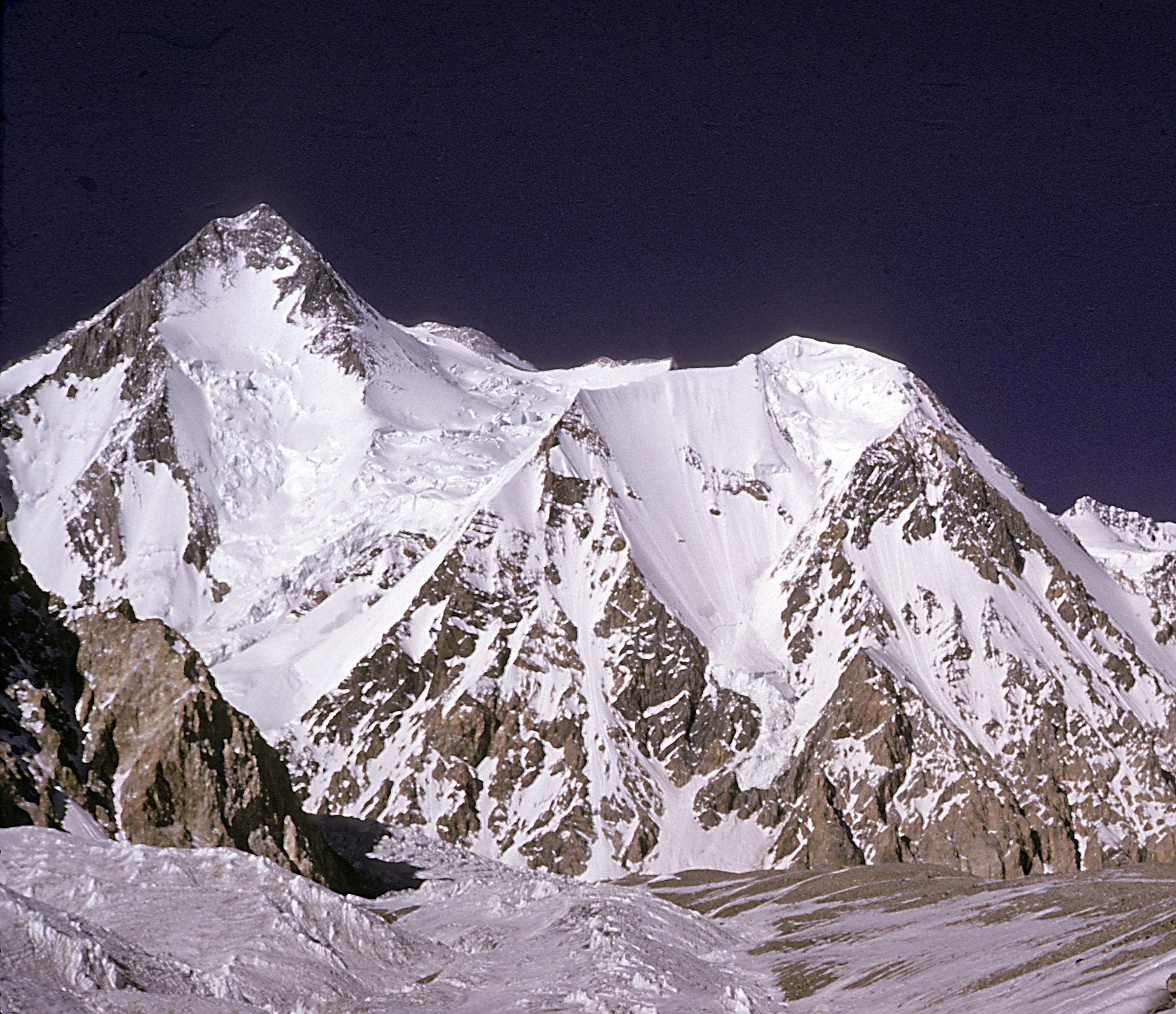
Gasherbrum I

In the Summer of 1975, Bregar was a member of a Yugoslav expedition in the Caucasus Mountains. On 17 July, the whole team reached the summit of Elbrus (5642 m, 18510 ft), the highest mountain in Europe. After that, the next goal was Nakratau (4277 m, 12157 ft). The climbers climbed through three different routes on the North wall of the mountain. Bregar was in a four-man team, together with Janez Dornik, Drago Šegregur and Franci Šter, that climbed the route Zamora. The route is mixed with rocks and ice, which was a chance for Drago to show his renowned skills in ice climbing.

Between 8 May and 22 August 1977, Slovenian climbers made their first trip to Karakoram in Pakistan, driving there and back. Two years before, on 6 October 1975, they reached the summit of their first eight-thousander, Makalu. On 8 July 1977, Nejc Zaplotnik and Andrej Štremfelj climbed a new route on the southwest face of Gasherbrum I, which was the second eight-thousander for the climbers. Bregar, who was the most experienced climber of the expedition with numerous ice climbing achievements in the Alps, tried to solo-climb the new Slovenian route the next day. However, the weather got worse and he got stuck not far from the peak of the mountain. The rest of the team tried to search for him, however, after six days of continuous snowing, they had to stop the rescue mission. Drago Bregar was aged 24.
