= Akseli Lankinen =

Finnish volleyball player (born 1997)

Personal information
- Nationality: Finnish
- Born: 31 August 1997 (age 29)

Volleyball information
- Position: setter
- Number: 1 (national team)

Career
Years	Teams
2015	(Finland) Kuortane Lentopallo

National team
2015	Finland

Akseli Lankinen (born 31 August 1997) is a Finnish male volleyball player. He is part of the Finland men's national volleyball team. He competed at the 2015 European Games in Baku. On club level he plays for Kuortane Lentopallo.
