= Firat Ezel Filiz =

Turkish volleyball player (born 1988)

Personal information
- Nationality: Turkish
- Born: 29 October 1988 (age 38)
- Height: 198 cm (6 ft 6 in)
- Weight: 100 kg (220 lb)
- Spike: 345 cm (136 in)
- Block: 330 cm (130 in)

Volleyball information
- Number: 24 (national team)

Career
Years	Teams
2015	Inegöl Belediyesi

National team
2015	Turkey

Firat Ezel Filiz (born 29 October 1988) is a Turkish male volleyball player. He is part of the Turkey men's national volleyball team. On club level he plays for Inegöl Belediyesi.
