= Ridl Garay =

Mexican volleyball player (born 1997)

Ridl Alexis Garay Nava

Personal information
- Nationality: Mexican
- Born: 9 June 1997 (age 29)
- Height: 194 cm (6 ft 4 in)
- Weight: 74 kg (163 lb)
- Spike: 326 cm (128 in)
- Block: 299 cm (118 in)

Career
Years	Teams
2015	Jalisco

National team
2015	Mexico

Ridl Alexis Garay Nava (born 9 June 1997) is a Mexican male volleyball player. He is part of the Mexico men's national volleyball team. On club level he plays for Jalisco.
