= Aleš Kök =

Slovenian volleyball player (born 1996)

Personal information
- Nationality: Slovenian
- Born: 11 December 1996 (age 29)
- Height: 1.98 m (6 ft 6 in)
- Weight: 88 kg (194 lb)
- Spike: 335 cm (132 in)
- Block: 308 cm (121 in)

Volleyball information
- Position: Setter
- Current club: Astec Triglav
- Number: 17 (National Team)

Career
Years	Teams
2015-2016	(Slovenia) Astec Triglav

National team
2015-2016	Slovenia
- Last updated: 17 March 2017

Aleš Kök (born 11 December 1996) is a Slovenian male volleyball player. He is part of the Slovenia men's national volleyball team. He competed at the 2015 Men's European Volleyball Championship. At club level he plays for Astec Triglav.

== See also ==
- Slovenia men's national volleyball team
