= Antti Ropponen =

Finnish volleyball player (born 1995)

Personal information
- Nationality: Finnish
- Born: 17 August 1995 (age 31)
- Height: 1.90 m (6 ft 3 in)
- Weight: 87 kg (192 lb)
- Spike: 342 cm (135 in)
- Block: 315 cm (124 in)

Volleyball information
- Position: Opposite
- Current club: Loimaan Hurrikaani

National team
Finland

Antti Ropponen (born 17 August 1995) is a Finnish volleyball player for Hurrikaani Loimaa and the Finnish national team.

He participated at the 2017 Men's European Volleyball Championship.
