= Diogo Pereira (volleyball) =

Portuguese volleyball player (born 1997)

Personal information
- Nationality: Portuguese
- Born: 21 June 1997 (age 29)
- Height: 200 cm (6 ft 7 in)
- Weight: 70 kg (154 lb)
- Spike: 310 cm (122 in)
- Block: 300 cm (118 in)

Volleyball information
- Number: 21 (national team)

Career
Years	Teams
2015	VC Viana

National team
2015	Portugal

Diogo Pereira (born 21 June 1997) is a Portuguese male volleyball player. He is part of the Portugal men's national volleyball team. On club level he plays for VC Viana.
