= Son Hyun-jong =

South Korean volleyball player (born 1992)

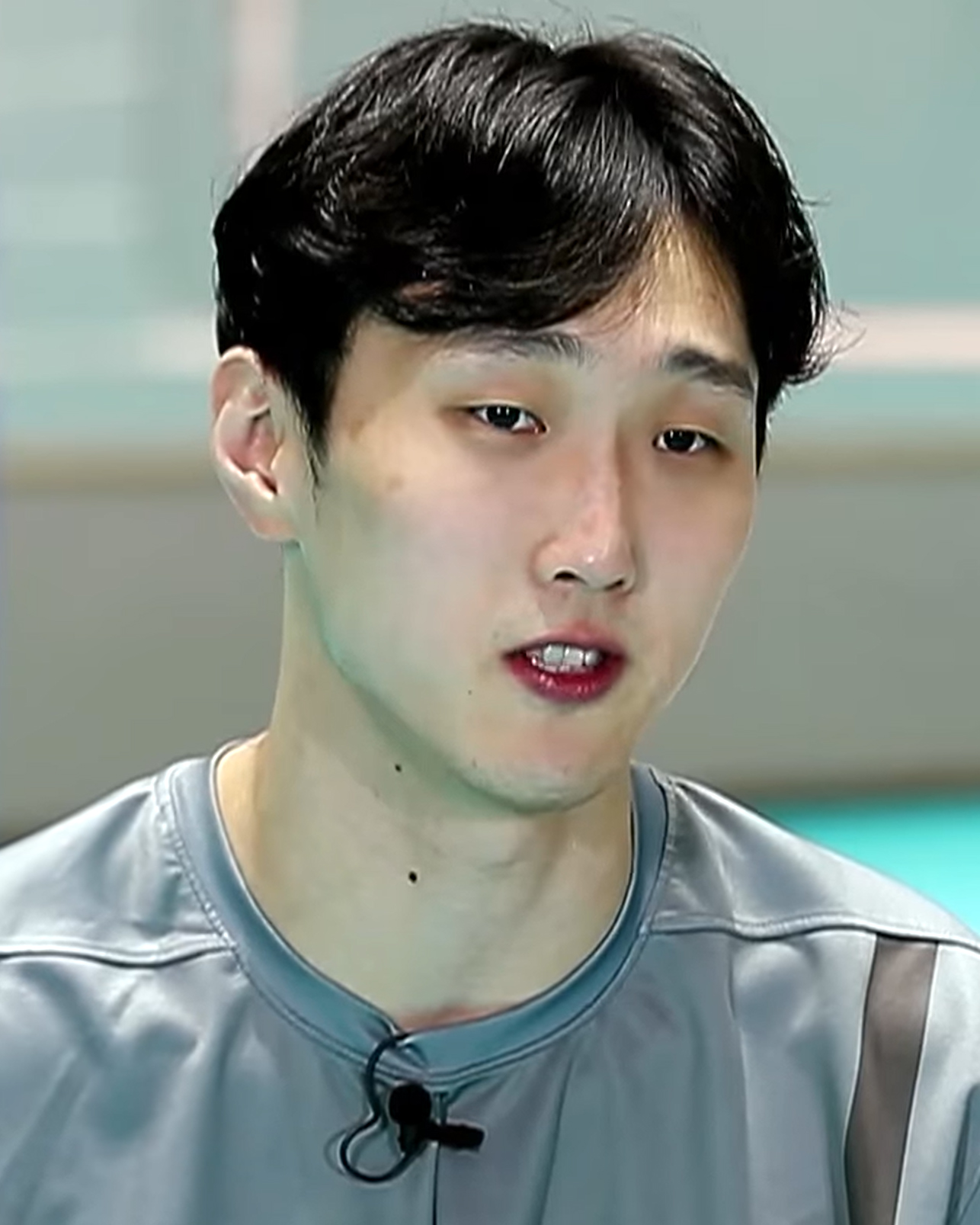
- Son in 2018

Personal information
- Nationality: South Korean
- Born: 8 April 1992 (age 34); Seoul, South Korea
- Height: 197 cm (6 ft 6 in)
- Weight: 90 kg (198 lb)
- Spike: 315 cm (10 ft 4 in)
- Block: 305 cm (10 ft 0 in)
- Education: Inha University

Volleyball information
- Position: Outside hitter
- Current club: Uijeongbu KB Stars
- Number: 8

Career
Years	Teams
2013–	LIG Greaters / KB Stars

Son Hyun-jong (Korean: 손현종; born 8 April 1992 in Seoul) is a South Korean male volleyball player. On club level he plays for the Uijeongbu KB Stars.

== Career ==
While attending Moonil High School in 2010, Son was selected for the South Korean junior national team to compete at the 2010 Asian Youth (U18) Championship and the 2010 Asian Junior (U20) Championship.

As a sophomore at Inha University in 2012, Son was selected for the South Korean collegiate national team to compete at the 2012 AVC Cup, where the team finished in fifth place.

In the 2013 V-League Draft, Son was selected tenth overall by the Gumi LIG Greaters.
