= Asset Bazarkulov =

Kazakhstani volleyball player (born 1987)

Personal information
- Nationality: Kazakhstani
- Born: 1 March 1987 (age 39)
- Height: 202 cm (6 ft 8 in)
- Weight: 87 kg (192 lb)
- Spike: 340 cm (134 in)
- Block: 330 cm (130 in)

Volleyball information
- Number: 7 (national team)

Career
Years	Teams
2015	Almaty

National team
2015	Kazakhstan

Asset Bazarkulov (born 1 March 1987) is a Kazakhstani male volleyball player. He is part of the Kazakhstan men's national volleyball team. On club level he plays for Almaty.
