= Peter Kasper (volleyball) =

Slovak volleyball player (born 1985)

Personal information
- Nationality: Slovak
- Born: 12 March 1985 (age 41)
- Height: 201 cm (6 ft 7 in)
- Weight: 105 kg (231 lb)
- Spike: 345 cm (136 in)
- Block: 330 cm (130 in)

Volleyball information
- Number: 23 (national team)

Career
Years	Teams
2015	Chemes Spisska Nova Ves

National team
2015	Slovakia

Peter Kasper (born 12 March 1985) is a Slovak male volleyball player. He is part of the Slovakia men's national volleyball team. On club level he plays for Chemes Spisska Nova Ves.
