= Eetu Pennanen =

Finnish volleyball player (born 1992)

Personal information
- Nationality: Finnish
- Born: 18 September 1992 (age 34)
- Height: 1.83 m (6 ft 0 in)
- Weight: 78 kg (172 lb)
- Spike: 335 cm (132 in)
- Block: 315 cm (124 in)

Volleyball information
- Position: Outside spiker

National team
Finland

Eetu Pennanen (born 18 September 1992) is a Finnish volleyball player for the Finnish national team.

He participated at the 2017 Men's European Volleyball Championship.
