= Miha Bregar =

Slovenian volleyball player (born 1993)

Personal information
- Nationality: Slovenian
- Born: 25 October 1993 (age 33); Ljubljana
- Height: 2 m (6 ft 7 in)
- Weight: 98 kg (216 lb)
- Spike: 345 cm (136 in)
- Block: 333 cm (131 in)

Volleyball information
- Position: Middle Blocker
- Number: 4 (Mok Krka)

Career
Years	Teams
Unknown	(Slovenia) Mok Krka

National team
2011-2012	Slovenia
- Last updated: 14 March 2017

Miha Bregar (born 25 October 1993) is a Slovenian male volleyball player. He is part of the Slovenia men's national volleyball team and plays the position of Middle Blocker. He competed at the 2011 CEV Youth Volleyball European Championship and 2012 CEV Junior Volleyball European Championship. At club level he plays for Mok Krka.

== See also ==
- Slovenia men's national volleyball team
