= Mubarak Dahi =

Qatari male volleyball player

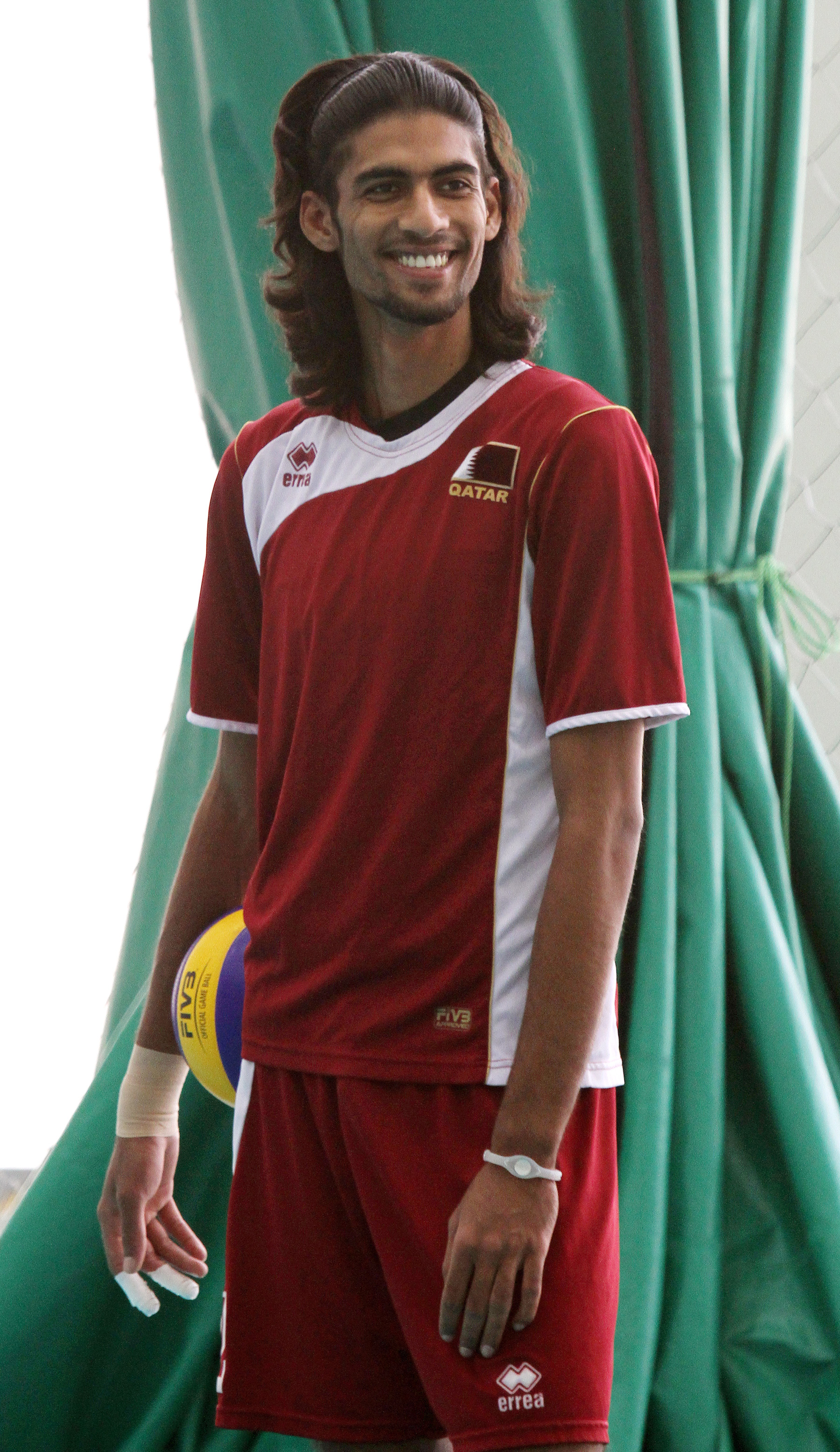
- Mubarak Dahi Waleed in 2012

Personal information
- Full name: Mubarak Dahi Waleed
- Nationality: Qatari
- Born: 1 April 1991 (age 35)
- Height: 202 cm (6 ft 8 in)
- Weight: 92 kg (203 lb)
- Spike: 350 cm (138 in)
- Block: 325 cm (128 in)

Volleyball information
- Number: 12

Career
Years	Teams
2012	Al-Rayyan Sport Club
Honours
Volleyball
Representing Qatar
International Competitions
Gold medal – first place	2024	Asian Men's Volleyball Challenge Cup
Bronze medal – third place	2025	2025 AVC Nations Cup

Mubarak Dahi Waleed (Arabic: مبارك ضاحي, born 1 April 1991) is a Qatari male volleyball player. With his club Al-Rayyan Sport Club he competed at the 2012 FIVB Volleyball Men's Club World Championship.

== Honours ==
=== Club ===
- AVC Champions League
  - 2025 – with Al Rayyan
