= Sergey Kuznetsov (volleyball) =

Kazakhstani volleyball player (born 1993)

Personal information
- Nationality: Kazakhstani
- Born: 26 October 1993 (age 33)
- Height: 197 cm (6 ft 6 in)
- Weight: 89 kg (196 lb)
- Spike: 321 cm (126 in)
- Block: 315 cm (124 in)

Volleyball information
- Number: 5 (national team)

Career
Years	Teams
2015	Almaty VC

National team
2015	Kazakhstan

Sergey Kuznetsov (born 26 October 1993) is a Kazakhstani male volleyball player. He is part of the Kazakhstan men's national volleyball team. On club level he plays for Almaty VC.
