= Vitaliy Mironenko =

Kazakhstani volleyball player (born 1985)

Personal information
- Nationality: Kazakhstani
- Born: 18 May 1985 (age 41)
- Height: 187 cm (6 ft 2 in)
- Weight: 90 kg (198 lb)
- Spike: 331 cm (130 in)
- Block: 329 cm (130 in)

Volleyball information
- Number: 22 (national team)

Career
- Years: Team
- 2015: Almaty Vc

National team
- Years: Team
- 2015: Kazakhstan

Vitaliy Mironenko (born 18 May 1985) is a Kazakhstani male volleyball player. He is part of the Kazakhstan men's national volleyball team. On club level he plays for Almaty Vc.
