= Vitaliy Erdshtein =

Kazakhstani volleyball player (born 1992)

Personal information
- Nationality: Kazakhstani
- Born: 5 May 1992 (age 34) Г. Темиртау
- Home town: Алматы
- Education: КазНУ им. Аль-Фараби
- Height: 207 cm (6 ft 9 in)
- Weight: 98 kg (216 lb)
- Spike: 355 cm (140 in)
- Block: 335 cm (132 in)

Volleyball information
- Position: Диагональный
- Number: 13 (national team)

Career
- Years: Team
- 2015: Almaty Vc

National team
- Years: Team
- 2015: Kazakhstan

Vitaliy Erdshtein (born 5 May 1992) is a Kazakhstani male volleyball player. He is part of the Kazakhstan men's national volleyball team. On Club level he plays for Almaty Vc.
