= Nursultan Bimurza =

Kazakhstani volleyball player (born 1994)

Personal information
- Nationality: Kazakhstani
- Born: 10 March 1994 (age 32)
- Height: 195 cm (6 ft 5 in)
- Weight: 75 kg (165 lb)
- Spike: 325 cm (128 in)
- Block: 320 cm (126 in)

Volleyball information
- Number: 20 (national team)

Career
Years	Teams
2015	Atyrau Vc

National team
2015	Kazakhstan

Nursultan Bimurza (born 10 March 1994) is a Kazakhstani volleyball player. He is part of the Kazakhstan men's national volleyball team. On club level he plays for Atyrau Vc.
