= Georgi Manchev =

Bulgarian volleyball player (born 1990)

Personal information
- Nationality: Bulgarian
- Born: 20 July 1990 (age 36)
- Height: 198 cm (6 ft 6 in)
- Weight: 88 kg (194 lb)
- Spike: 345 cm (136 in)
- Block: 335 cm (132 in)

Volleyball information
- Position: Setter
- Number: 3 (national team)

Career
Years	Teams
2012-2013	VC CSKA Sofia

National team
2015	Bulgaria

Georgi Manchev (Bulgarian: Георги Манчев) (born 20 July 1990) is a Bulgarian male volleyball player. He is part of the Bulgaria men's national volleyball team. On club level he played for VC CSKA Sofia.
