= Metodi Ananiev =

Bulgarian volleyball player (born 1986)

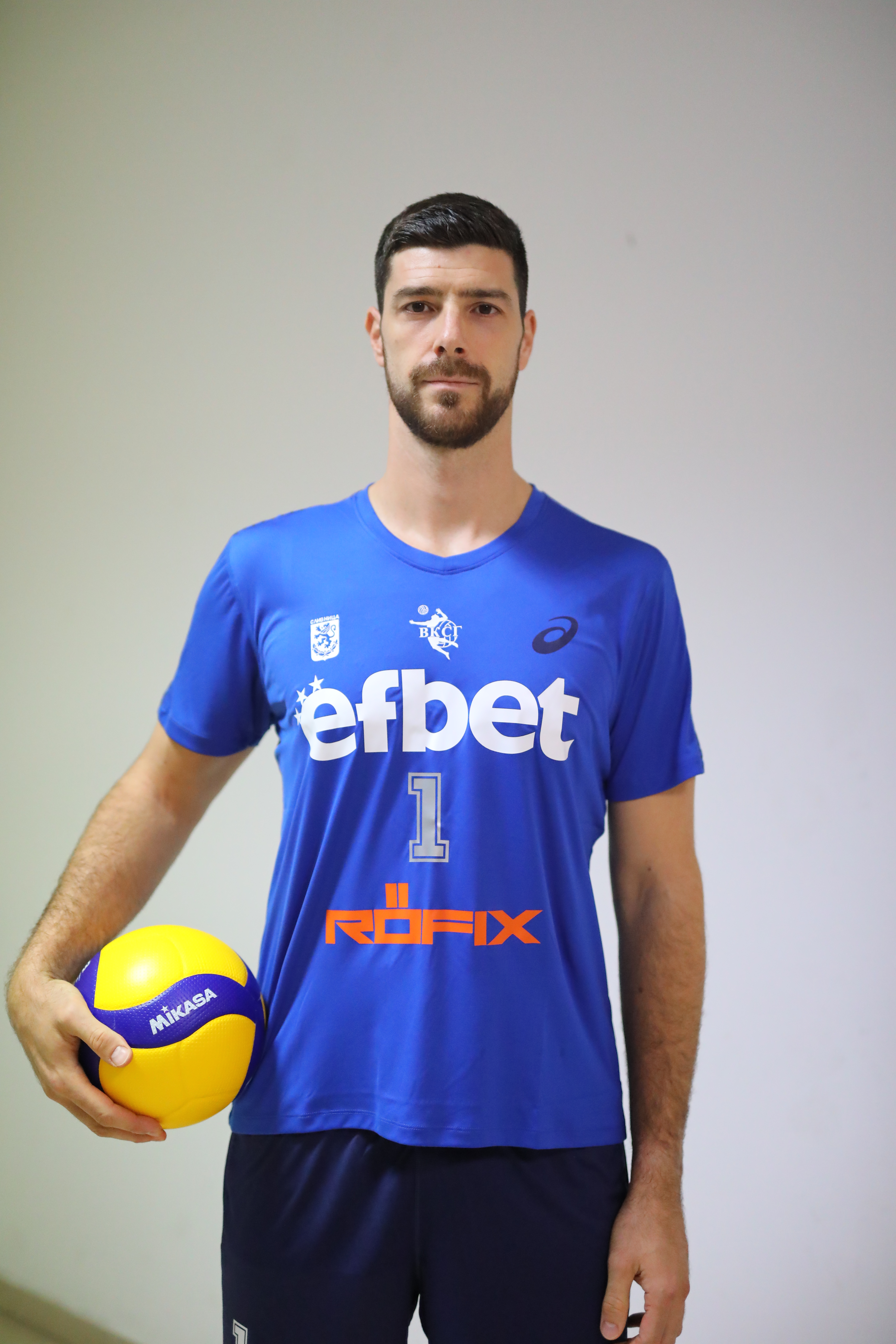

Personal information
- Nationality: Bulgarian
- Born: 17 February 1986 (age 40)
- Height: 203 cm (6 ft 8 in)
- Weight: 100 kg (220 lb)
- Spike: 363 cm (143 in)
- Block: 345 cm (136 in)

Volleyball information
- Position: Outside hitter
- Number: 24 (national team)

National team
2007-2012	Bulgaria

Metodi Ananiev (Bulgarian: Методи Ананиев; born 17 February 1986) is a Bulgarian male volleyball and beach volleyball player. He was part of the Bulgarian team of CSKA Sofia and Bulgaria men's national volleyball team.
