= Alexandr Stolnikov =

Kazakhstani volleyball player (born 1988)

Personal information
- Nationality: Kazakhstani
- Born: 17 July 1988 (age 38)
- Height: 197 cm (6 ft 6 in)
- Weight: 95 kg (209 lb)
- Spike: 340 cm (134 in)
- Block: 325 cm (128 in)

Volleyball information
- Number: 4 (national team)

Career
Years	Teams
2015	Tnk Kazchrome

National team
2015	Kazakhstan

Alexandr Stolnikov (born 17 July 1988) is a Kazakhstani male volleyball player. He is part of the Kazakhstan men's national volleyball team. On club level he plays for Tnk Kazchrome. Aleksandr Stolnikov was born on 17 July 1988 in Almaty, Kazakhstan. He started playing volleyball like his parents. Professional career began in 2000. His first professional volleyball club was «Condensat» (Uralsk). Alexander's national team debut took place at the qualifying round for the World Cup in Chinese Taipei. The club he plays at now – is « TNK-Kazkhrom».
