= Volleyball at the 2008 Summer Olympics – Men's team rosters =

This article shows the rosters of all participating teams at the men's indoor volleyball tournament at the 2008 Summer Olympics in Beijing.

== Pool A ==
=== Bulgaria ===
The following is the Bulgarian roster in the men's volleyball tournament of the 2008 Summer Olympics.

Head Coach: Martin Stoev

No.	Name	Date of birth	Height	Weight	Spike	Block	2008 club
1	Evgeni Ivanov	3 June 1974	2.10 m (6 ft 11 in)	98 kg (216 lb)	351 cm (138 in)	340 cm (130 in)	(Poland) Jastrzębski Węgiel
2	Hristo Tsvetanov	29 March 1978	1.98 m (6 ft 6 in)	85 kg (187 lb)	345 cm (136 in)	330 cm (130 in)	(Montenegro) Budvanska Rivijera Budva
3	Andrey Zhekov	12 March 1980	1.90 m (6 ft 3 in)	82 kg (181 lb)	340 cm (130 in)	326 cm (128 in)	(Greece) Patron Patra
4	Boyan Yordanov	12 March 1983	1.97 m (6 ft 6 in)	86 kg (190 lb)	358 cm (141 in)	335 cm (132 in)	(Greece) Olympiacos
5	Krasimir Gaydarski	23 February 1983	2.04 m (6 ft 8 in)	96 kg (212 lb)	350 cm (140 in)	330 cm (130 in)	(Greece) Olympiacos
6	Matey Kaziyski	23 September 1984	2.02 m (6 ft 8 in)	93 kg (205 lb)	370 cm (150 in)	335 cm (132 in)	(Italy) Trentino Volley
11	Vladimir Nikolov	3 October 1977	2.00 m (6 ft 7 in)	95 kg (209 lb)	345 cm (136 in)	325 cm (128 in)	(Italy) Trentino Volley
13	Teodor Salparov (c)	16 August 1982	1.85 m (6 ft 1 in)	73 kg (161 lb)	320 cm (130 in)	305 cm (120 in)	(Bulgaria) CSKA Sofia
14	Kostadin Stoykov	7 December 1977	1.99 m (6 ft 6 in)	85 kg (187 lb)	349 cm (137 in)	329 cm (130 in)	(Russia) VC Nova
15	Todor Aleksiev	21 April 1983	2.00 m (6 ft 7 in)	96 kg (212 lb)	347 cm (137 in)	327 cm (129 in)	(Bulgaria) Levski Siconco
17	Plamen Konstantinov (L)	14 June 1973	2.02 m (6 ft 8 in)	93 kg (205 lb)	350 cm (140 in)	330 cm (130 in)	(Greece) Iraklis
18	Ivan Tasev	21 March 1967	1.89 m (6 ft 2 in)	90 kg (200 lb)	334 cm (131 in)	316 cm (124 in)	(Bulgaria) CSKA Sofia

=== China ===
The following is the Chinese roster in the men's volleyball tournament of the 2008 Summer Olympics.

Head Coach: Zhou Jianan

No.	Name	Date of birth	Height	Weight	Spike	Block	2008 club
1	Bian Hongmin	22 September 1989	2.10 m (6 ft 11 in)	95 kg (209 lb)	355 cm (140 in)	330 cm (130 in)	(China) Zhejiang
4	Yuan Zhi	29 September 1981	1.95 m (6 ft 5 in)	88 kg (194 lb)	348 cm (137 in)	334 cm (131 in)	(China) Liaoning
5	Guo Peng	1 July 1982	2.00 m (6 ft 7 in)	84 kg (185 lb)	360 cm (140 in)	337 cm (133 in)	(China) Army
6	Shi Hairong	27 March 1977	1.92 m (6 ft 4 in)	80 kg (180 lb)	350 cm (140 in)	335 cm (132 in)	(China) Jiangsu
8	Cui Jianjun	1 August 1985	1.90 m (6 ft 3 in)	89 kg (196 lb)	350 cm (140 in)	335 cm (132 in)	(China) Henan
9	Jiao Shuai	28 January 1984	1.94 m (6 ft 4 in)	76 kg (168 lb)	350 cm (140 in)	341 cm (134 in)	(China) Henan
11	Yu Dawei	21 June 1984	1.99 m (6 ft 6 in)	90 kg (200 lb)	345 cm (136 in)	335 cm (132 in)	(China) Shandong
12	Shen Qiong (c)	5 September 1981	1.98 m (6 ft 6 in)	84 kg (185 lb)	359 cm (141 in)	349 cm (137 in)	(China) Shanghai
14	Jiang Fudong	10 January 1983	1.97 m (6 ft 6 in)	85 kg (187 lb)	345 cm (136 in)	336 cm (132 in)	(China) Sichuan
16	Ren Qi (L)	24 February 1984	1.74 m (5 ft 9 in)	70 kg (150 lb)	322 cm (127 in)	312 cm (123 in)	(China) Shanghai
17	Sui Shengsheng	30 May 1980	1.92 m (6 ft 4 in)	75 kg (165 lb)	345 cm (136 in)	334 cm (131 in)	(China) Liaoning
18	Fang Yingchao	3 August 1982	1.98 m (6 ft 6 in)	79 kg (174 lb)	360 cm (140 in)	350 cm (140 in)	(China) Shanghai

=== Italy ===
The following is the Italian roster in the men's volleyball tournament of the 2008 Summer Olympics.

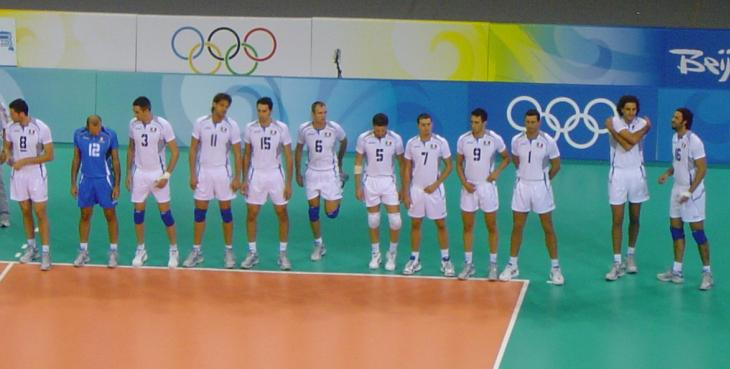
Italy's team just before the group stage match against the United States. From left: Cisolla, Corsano, Gavotto, Zlatanov, Birarelli, Meoni, Vermiglio, Paparoni, Martino, Mastrangelo, Fei, Bovolenta.

Head Coach: Andrea Anastasi

No.	Name	Date of birth	Height	Weight	Spike	Block	2008 club
1	Luigi Mastrangelo	17 August 1975	2.02 m (6 ft 8 in)	90 kg (200 lb)	368 cm (145 in)	336 cm (132 in)	(Italy) M. Roma Volley
3	Mauro Gavotto	16 April 1979	2.01 m (6 ft 7 in)	88 kg (194 lb)	350 cm (140 in)	330 cm (130 in)	(Italy) Acqua Paradiso Gabeca
5	Valerio Vermiglio	1 March 1976	1.90 m (6 ft 3 in)	83 kg (183 lb)	342 cm (135 in)	320 cm (130 in)	(Italy) Lube Banca Marche
6	Marco Meoni	25 May 1973	1.97 m (6 ft 6 in)	86 kg (190 lb)	338 cm (133 in)	313 cm (123 in)	(Italy) Copra Nordmeccanica
7	Alessandro Paparoni	17 August 1981	1.91 m (6 ft 3 in)	75 kg (165 lb)	340 cm (130 in)	314 cm (124 in)	(Italy) Lube Banca Marche
8	Alberto Cisolla (c)	10 October 1977	1.97 m (6 ft 6 in)	86 kg (190 lb)	367 cm (144 in)	345 cm (136 in)	(Italy) Sisley Treviso
9	Matteo Martino	28 January 1987	1.97 m (6 ft 6 in)	84 kg (185 lb)	340 cm (130 in)	322 cm (127 in)	(Italy) Sparkling Milano
11	Hristo Zlatanov	21 April 1976	2.04 m (6 ft 8 in)	103 kg (227 lb)	355 cm (140 in)	315 cm (124 in)	(Italy) Copra Nordmeccanica
12	Mirko Corsano (L)	28 October 1973	1.90 m (6 ft 3 in)	87 kg (192 lb)	342 cm (135 in)	303 cm (119 in)	(Italy) Lube Banca Marche
14	Alessandro Fei	29 November 1978	2.04 m (6 ft 8 in)	90 kg (200 lb)	358 cm (141 in)	336 cm (132 in)	(Italy) Sisley Treviso
15	Emanuele Birarelli	8 February 1981	2.00 m (6 ft 7 in)	95 kg (209 lb)	332 cm (131 in)	316 cm (124 in)	(Italy) Itas Diatec
16	Vigor Bovolenta	30 May 1974	2.02 m (6 ft 8 in)	95 kg (209 lb)	362 cm (143 in)	327 cm (129 in)	(Italy) Copra Nordmeccanica

=== Japan ===
The following is the Japanese roster in the men's volleyball tournament of the 2008 Summer Olympics.

Head Coach: Tatsuya Ueta

No.	Name	Date of birth	Height	Weight	Spike	Block	2008 club
1	Nobuharu Saito	29 September 1973	2.05 m (6 ft 9 in)	95 kg (209 lb)	345 cm (136 in)	330 cm (130 in)	(Japan) Toray Arrows
5	Daisuke Usami	29 March 1979	1.83 m (6 ft 0 in)	83 kg (183 lb)	330 cm (130 in)	320 cm (130 in)	(Japan) Panasonic Panthers
7	Takahiro Yamamoto	12 July 1978	2.01 m (6 ft 7 in)	90 kg (200 lb)	345 cm (136 in)	331 cm (130 in)	(Japan) Panasonic Panthers
8	Masaji Ogino (c)	8 January 1970	1.97 m (6 ft 6 in)	98 kg (216 lb)	340 cm (130 in)	320 cm (130 in)	(Japan) Suntory Sunbirds
11	Yoshihiko Matsumoto	7 January 1981	1.93 m (6 ft 4 in)	80 kg (180 lb)	358 cm (141 in)	340 cm (130 in)	(Japan) NEC Blue Rockets
12	Kota Yamamura	20 October 1980	2.05 m (6 ft 9 in)	95 kg (209 lb)	350 cm (140 in)	340 cm (130 in)	(Japan) Suntory Sunbirds
13	Kunihiro Shimizu	11 August 1986	1.94 m (6 ft 4 in)	95 kg (209 lb)	345 cm (136 in)	320 cm (130 in)	(Japan) Tokai University
14	Tatsuya Fukuzawa	1 July 1986	1.89 m (6 ft 2 in)	84 kg (185 lb)	355 cm (140 in)	330 cm (130 in)	(Japan) Chuo University
15	Katsutoshi Tsumagari (L)	2 November 1975	1.83 m (6 ft 0 in)	78 kg (172 lb)	320 cm (130 in)	305 cm (120 in)	(Japan) Suntory Sunbirds
16	Yusuke Ishijima	9 January 1984	1.97 m (6 ft 6 in)	100 kg (220 lb)	345 cm (136 in)	335 cm (132 in)	(Japan) Osaka Blazers Sakai
17	Yu Koshikawa	30 June 1984	1.90 m (6 ft 3 in)	87 kg (192 lb)	348 cm (137 in)	335 cm (132 in)	(Japan) Suntory Sunbirds
18	Kosuke Tomonaga	22 July 1980	1.84 m (6 ft 0 in)	83 kg (183 lb)	320 cm (130 in)	310 cm (120 in)	(Japan) Osaka Blazers Sakai

=== United States ===
The following is the American roster in the men's volleyball tournament of the 2008 Summer Olympics.

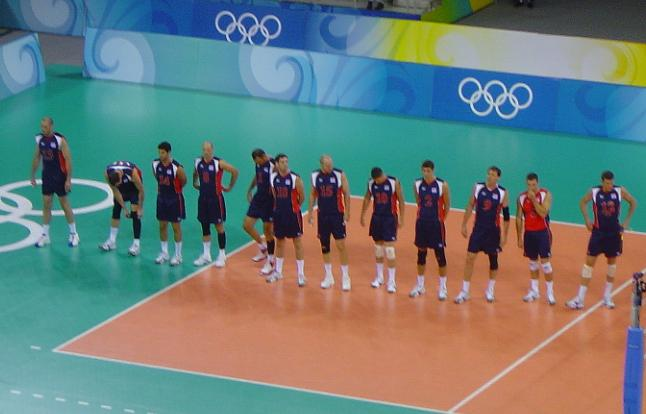
The United States team just before the group stage match against Italy. From left: Stanley, Lee, Hansen, Priddy, Ball, Touzinsky, Gardner, Salmon, Rooney, Millar, Lambourne, Hoff.

Head Coach: (New Zealand) Hugh McCutcheon

No.	Name	Date of birth	Height	Weight	Spike	Block	2008 club
1	Lloy Ball	17 February 1972	2.03 m (6 ft 8 in)	95 kg (209 lb)	351 cm (138 in)	316 cm (124 in)	(Russia) Zenit Kazan
2	Sean Rooney	13 November 1982	2.06 m (6 ft 9 in)	100 kg (220 lb)	354 cm (139 in)	336 cm (132 in)	(Russia) Dinamo-Yantar Kaliningrad
4	David Lee	8 March 1982	2.03 m (6 ft 8 in)	105 kg (231 lb)	350 cm (140 in)	325 cm (128 in)	(Turkey) Halkbank Ankara
5	Richard Lambourne (L)	6 May 1975	1.90 m (6 ft 3 in)	90 kg (200 lb)	324 cm (128 in)	312 cm (123 in)	(Poland) AZS Olsztyn
8	William Priddy	1 October 1977	1.96 m (6 ft 5 in)	89 kg (196 lb)	353 cm (139 in)	330 cm (130 in)	(Russia) Lokomotiv Novosibirsk
9	Ryan Millar	22 January 1978	2.04 m (6 ft 8 in)	98 kg (216 lb)	354 cm (139 in)	326 cm (128 in)	(Italy) Sparkling Milano
10	Riley Salmon	2 July 1976	1.97 m (6 ft 6 in)	89 kg (196 lb)	345 cm (136 in)	331 cm (130 in)	(Italy) Top Volley SRL
12	Thomas Hoff (c)	9 June 1973	1.98 m (6 ft 6 in)	94 kg (207 lb)	353 cm (139 in)	333 cm (131 in)	(Russia) Fakel New Urengoy
13	Clay Stanley	20 January 1978	2.05 m (6 ft 9 in)	104 kg (229 lb)	357 cm (141 in)	332 cm (131 in)	(Russia) Zenit Kazan
14	Kevin Hansen	19 March 1982	1.96 m (6 ft 5 in)	93 kg (205 lb)	349 cm (137 in)	330 cm (130 in)	(France) Stade Poitevin Poitiers
15	Gabriel Gardner	18 March 1976	2.09 m (6 ft 10 in)	103 kg (227 lb)	353 cm (139 in)	335 cm (132 in)	(Italy) Sparkling Milano
18	Scott Touzinsky	22 April 1982	1.98 m (6 ft 6 in)	86 kg (190 lb)	344 cm (135 in)	330 cm (130 in)	(Slovenia) ACH Volley Bled

=== Venezuela ===
The following is the Venezuelan roster in the men's volleyball tournament of the 2008 Summer Olympics.

Head Coach: (Brazil) Ricardo Navajas

No.	Name	Date of birth	Height	Weight	Spike	Block	2008 club
3	Andy Rojas (c)	2 October 1977	1.97 m (6 ft 6 in)	95 kg (209 lb)	315 cm (124 in)	318 cm (125 in)	(Italy) Ermoli
4	Joel Silva (L)	14 September 1985	1.88 m (6 ft 2 in)	78 kg (172 lb)	334 cm (131 in)	329 cm (130 in)	(Venezuela) Apure
5	Rodman Valera	20 April 1982	1.88 m (6 ft 2 in)	82 kg (181 lb)	337 cm (133 in)	332 cm (131 in)	(Venezuela) Compoktuna
6	Carlos Luna	25 January 1981	1.94 m (6 ft 4 in)	85 kg (187 lb)	339 cm (133 in)	331 cm (130 in)	(Japan) Toyoda Gosei Trefuerza
7	Luis Díaz	20 August 1983	2.04 m (6 ft 8 in)	92 kg (203 lb)	349 cm (137 in)	342 cm (135 in)	(Italy) Tonno Calippo
10	Ronald Méndez	26 October 1982	2.03 m (6 ft 8 in)	84 kg (185 lb)	357 cm (141 in)	352 cm (139 in)	(Venezuela) Bolívar
11	Ernardo Gómez	30 July 1982	1.95 m (6 ft 5 in)	90 kg (200 lb)	355 cm (140 in)	350 cm (140 in)	(Japan) Toyoda Gosei Trefuerza
12	Carlos Tejeda	29 July 1980	1.98 m (6 ft 6 in)	90 kg (200 lb)	340 cm (130 in)	315 cm (124 in)	(Spain) CV Almería
13	Iván Márquez	4 October 1981	2.05 m (6 ft 9 in)	85 kg (187 lb)	339 cm (133 in)	333 cm (131 in)	(Netherlands) Verening
14	Thomas Ereu	25 October 1979	1.94 m (6 ft 4 in)	85 kg (187 lb)	352 cm (139 in)	345 cm (136 in)	(Italy) Taviano
17	Juan Carlos Blanco	27 July 1981	1.95 m (6 ft 5 in)	83 kg (183 lb)	341 cm (134 in)	336 cm (132 in)	(Venezuela) Karava
18	Freddy Cedeño	10 September 1981	2.05 m (6 ft 9 in)	95 kg (209 lb)	353 cm (139 in)	348 cm (137 in)	(Spain) Arona

== Pool B ==
=== Brazil ===
The following is the Brazilian roster in the men's volleyball tournament of the 2008 Summer Olympics.

Head Coach: Bernardinho

No.	Name	Date of birth	Height	Weight	Spike	Block	2008 club
1	Bruno Rezende	2 July 1986	1.90 m (6 ft 3 in)	76 kg (168 lb)	323 cm (127 in)	302 cm (119 in)	(Brazil) Cimed
2	Marcelo Elgarten	9 November 1974	1.83 m (6 ft 0 in)	78 kg (172 lb)	321 cm (126 in)	308 cm (121 in)	(Greece) Panathinaikos VC
4	André Heller	17 December 1975	1.99 m (6 ft 6 in)	93 kg (205 lb)	339 cm (133 in)	321 cm (126 in)	(Italy) Pallavolo Modena
6	Samuel Fuchs	4 March 1984	2.00 m (6 ft 7 in)	89 kg (196 lb)	342 cm (135 in)	316 cm (124 in)	(Russia) Lokomotiv Belgorod
7	Giba (c)	23 December 1976	1.92 m (6 ft 4 in)	85 kg (187 lb)	325 cm (128 in)	312 cm (123 in)	(Russia) Iskra Odintsovo
8	Murilo Endres	3 May 1981	1.90 m (6 ft 3 in)	76 kg (168 lb)	343 cm (135 in)	319 cm (126 in)	(Italy) Pallavolo Modena
9	André Nascimento	4 March 1979	1.95 m (6 ft 5 in)	95 kg (209 lb)	340 cm (130 in)	320 cm (130 in)	(Italy) Pallavolo Modena
10	Sérgio Santos (L)	15 October 1975	1.84 m (6 ft 0 in)	78 kg (172 lb)	325 cm (128 in)	310 cm (120 in)	(Italy) Copra Nordmeccanica
11	Anderson Rodrigues	21 May 1974	1.90 m (6 ft 3 in)	95 kg (209 lb)	330 cm (130 in)	321 cm (126 in)	(Brazil) Sport Club Ulbra
13	Gustavo Endres	23 August 1975	2.03 m (6 ft 8 in)	98 kg (216 lb)	337 cm (133 in)	325 cm (128 in)	(Italy) Sisley Treviso
14	Rodrigão	17 April 1979	2.05 m (6 ft 9 in)	85 kg (187 lb)	350 cm (140 in)	328 cm (129 in)	(Italy) Lube Banca Marche
18	Dante Amaral	30 September 1980	2.01 m (6 ft 7 in)	88 kg (194 lb)	345 cm (136 in)	327 cm (129 in)	(Greece) Panathinaikos VC

=== Egypt ===
The following is the Egyptian roster in the men's volleyball tournament of the 2008 Summer Olympics.

Head Coach: Ahmed Zakaria

No.	Name	Date of birth	Height	Weight	Spike	Block	2008 club
1	Hamdy Awad (c)	14 April 1972	2.02 m (6 ft 8 in)	105 kg (231 lb)	346 cm (136 in)	327 cm (129 in)	(Egypt) AHLY
2	Abdalla Ahmed	10 October 1983	1.98 m (6 ft 6 in)	72 kg (159 lb)	352 cm (139 in)	331 cm (130 in)	(Italy) Gabeca Montichiari
3	Mohamed Gabal	21 January 1984	1.95 m (6 ft 5 in)	97 kg (214 lb)	345 cm (136 in)	320 cm (130 in)	(Egypt) Elgaish
4	Ahmed Abdel Naeim	19 August 1984	1.97 m (6 ft 6 in)	87 kg (192 lb)	342 cm (135 in)	316 cm (124 in)	(Egypt) AHLY
5	Abdel Latif Ahmed	13 August 1983	2.02 m (6 ft 8 in)	90 kg (200 lb)	345 cm (136 in)	325 cm (128 in)	(Egypt) AHLY
6	Wael Al-Aydy (L)	8 December 1971	1.78 m (5 ft 10 in)	76 kg (168 lb)	305 cm (120 in)	290 cm (110 in)	(Egypt) AHLY
7	Ashraf Abouelhassan	17 May 1975	1.84 m (6 ft 0 in)	87 kg (192 lb)	321 cm (126 in)	302 cm (119 in)	(Egypt) Zamalek
8	Saleh Youssef	25 July 1982	1.94 m (6 ft 4 in)	90 kg (200 lb)	348 cm (137 in)	326 cm (128 in)	(Egypt) Zamalek
13	Mohamed Badawy	11 January 1986	1.97 m (6 ft 6 in)	99 kg (218 lb)	335 cm (132 in)	322 cm (127 in)	(Egypt) Zamalek
14	Hossameldin Gomaa	15 February 1984	1.99 m (6 ft 6 in)	92 kg (203 lb)	344 cm (135 in)	324 cm (128 in)	(Egypt) AHLY
16	Mohamed Seif El-Nasr	5 September 1983	2.03 m (6 ft 8 in)	80 kg (180 lb)	346 cm (136 in)	326 cm (128 in)	(Egypt) Zalamek
17	Mahmoud Abd El Kader	12 May 1985	1.95 m (6 ft 5 in)	94 kg (207 lb)	342 cm (135 in)	316 cm (124 in)	(Egypt) AHLY

=== Germany ===
The following is the German roster in the men's volleyball tournament of the 2008 Summer Olympics.

Head Coach: (Romania) Stelian Moculescu

No.	Name	Date of birth	Height	Weight	Spike	Block	2008 club
1	Marcus Popp	23 September 1981	1.92 m (6 ft 4 in)	90 kg (200 lb)	358 cm (141 in)	338 cm (133 in)	(Italy) Marmi Lanza Verona
4	Simon Tischer	24 April 1982	1.94 m (6 ft 4 in)	88 kg (194 lb)	346 cm (136 in)	328 cm (129 in)	(Greece) Iraklis
5	Björn Andrae (c)	14 May 1981	2.00 m (6 ft 7 in)	92 kg (203 lb)	350 cm (140 in)	330 cm (130 in)	(Poland) AZS Olsztyn
7	Mark Siebeck	14 October 1975	1.96 m (6 ft 5 in)	92 kg (203 lb)	345 cm (136 in)	320 cm (130 in)	(Turkey) Halkbank Ankara
8	Marcus Böhme	25 August 1985	2.11 m (6 ft 11 in)	111 kg (245 lb)	345 cm (136 in)	321 cm (126 in)	(Germany) SCC Berlin
9	Stefan Hübner	13 June 1975	2.00 m (6 ft 7 in)	99 kg (218 lb)	365 cm (144 in)	345 cm (136 in)	(Italy) Sisley Treviso
10	Jochen Schöps	8 October 1983	2.00 m (6 ft 7 in)	100 kg (220 lb)	360 cm (140 in)	335 cm (132 in)	(Russia) Iskra Odintsovo
11	Frank Dehne	14 February 1976	2.02 m (6 ft 8 in)	100 kg (220 lb)	340 cm (130 in)	320 cm (130 in)	(Italy) Marmi Lanza Verona
12	Christian Pampel	6 September 1979	1.98 m (6 ft 6 in)	92 kg (203 lb)	360 cm (140 in)	340 cm (130 in)	(Russia) Gazprom-Jugra Surgut
13	Ralph Bergmann	26 May 1970	2.06 m (6 ft 9 in)	95 kg (209 lb)	350 cm (140 in)	327 cm (129 in)	(Germany) Moerser SC
14	Robert Kromm	9 March 1984	2.12 m (6 ft 11 in)	100 kg (220 lb)	360 cm (140 in)	345 cm (136 in)	(Italy) Sempre Volley
19	Thomas Kröger (L)	11 June 1979	1.90 m (6 ft 3 in)	82 kg (181 lb)	328 cm (129 in)	302 cm (119 in)	(Germany) VfB Friedrichshafen

=== Poland ===
The following is the Polish roster in the men's volleyball tournament of the 2008 Summer Olympics.

Head Coach: (Argentina) Raúl Lozano

No.	Name	Date of birth	Height	Weight	Spike	Block	2008 club
2	Michał Winiarski	28 September 1983	2.00 m (6 ft 7 in)	82 kg (181 lb)	355 cm (140 in)	335 cm (132 in)	(Italy) Itas Diatec Trentino
3	Piotr Gruszka (c)	8 March 1977	2.06 m (6 ft 9 in)	102 kg (225 lb)	355 cm (140 in)	330 cm (130 in)	(Turkey) Arkas Izmir
4	Daniel Pliński	10 December 1978	2.05 m (6 ft 9 in)	99 kg (218 lb)	350 cm (140 in)	330 cm (130 in)	(Poland) Skra Bełchatów
5	Paweł Zagumny	18 October 1977	2.00 m (6 ft 7 in)	88 kg (194 lb)	336 cm (132 in)	317 cm (125 in)	(Poland) AZS Olsztyn
8	Marcin Wika	9 November 1983	1.94 m (6 ft 4 in)	86 kg (190 lb)	335 cm (132 in)	310 cm (120 in)	(Poland) Asseco Resovia
10	Mariusz Wlazły	4 August 1983	1.97 m (6 ft 6 in)	75 kg (165 lb)	362 cm (143 in)	343 cm (135 in)	(Poland) Skra Bełchatów
11	Łukasz Kadziewicz	20 September 1980	2.06 m (6 ft 9 in)	84 kg (185 lb)	360 cm (140 in)	335 cm (132 in)	(Poland) Trefl Gdańsk
12	Paweł Woicki	29 June 1983	1.82 m (6 ft 0 in)	75 kg (165 lb)	315 cm (124 in)	300 cm (120 in)	(Poland) Asseco Resovia
13	Sebastian Świderski	26 June 1977	1.93 m (6 ft 4 in)	88 kg (194 lb)	354 cm (139 in)	325 cm (128 in)	(Italy) Lube Banca Marche
14	Krzysztof Gierczyński	23 January 1976	1.93 m (6 ft 4 in)	81 kg (179 lb)	337 cm (133 in)	324 cm (128 in)	(Poland) Asseco Resovia
16	Krzysztof Ignaczak (L)	15 May 1978	1.88 m (6 ft 2 in)	86 kg (190 lb)	330 cm (130 in)	315 cm (124 in)	(Poland) Asseco Resovia
18	Marcin Możdżonek	9 February 1985	2.11 m (6 ft 11 in)	93 kg (205 lb)	355 cm (140 in)	335 cm (132 in)	(Poland) AZS Olsztyn

=== Russia ===
The following is the Russian roster in the men's volleyball tournament of the 2008 Summer Olympics.

Head Coach: Vladimir Alekno

No.	Name	Date of birth	Height	Weight	Spike	Block	2008 club
1	Aleksandr Korneev	11 September 1980	2.00 m (6 ft 7 in)	96 kg (212 lb)	348 cm (137 in)	339 cm (133 in)	(Russia) Zenit Kazan
2	Semen Poltavskiy	8 February 1981	2.05 m (6 ft 9 in)	89 kg (196 lb)	346 cm (136 in)	338 cm (133 in)	(Russia) Dynamo Moscow
3	Aleksandr Kosarev	30 September 1977	2.03 m (6 ft 8 in)	95 kg (209 lb)	339 cm (133 in)	328 cm (129 in)	(Russia) Lokomotiv-Belogorie
6	Sergey Grankin	21 January 1985	1.95 m (6 ft 5 in)	87 kg (192 lb)	351 cm (138 in)	320 cm (130 in)	(Russia) Dynamo Moscow
8	Sergey Tetyukhin	23 September 1975	1.97 m (6 ft 6 in)	89 kg (196 lb)	345 cm (136 in)	338 cm (133 in)	(Russia) Lokomotiv-Belogorie
9	Vadim Khamuttskikh (c)	26 November 1969	1.96 m (6 ft 5 in)	85 kg (187 lb)	342 cm (135 in)	331 cm (130 in)	(Russia) Lokomotiv-Belogorie
10	Yury Berezhko	27 January 1984	1.98 m (6 ft 6 in)	90 kg (200 lb)	346 cm (136 in)	338 cm (133 in)	(Russia) Dynamo Moscow
13	Aleksey Ostapenko	26 May 1986	2.08 m (6 ft 10 in)	94 kg (207 lb)	355 cm (140 in)	340 cm (130 in)	(Russia) Dynamo Moscow
15	Aleksandr Volkov	14 February 1985	2.10 m (6 ft 11 in)	90 kg (200 lb)	355 cm (140 in)	335 cm (132 in)	(Russia) Dynamo Moscow
16	Aleksey Verbov (L)	31 January 1982	1.83 m (6 ft 0 in)	77 kg (170 lb)	315 cm (124 in)	310 cm (120 in)	(Russia) Iskra Odintsovo
17	Maxim Mikhaylov	19 March 1988	2.03 m (6 ft 8 in)	85 kg (187 lb)	345 cm (136 in)	330 cm (130 in)	(Russia) Yaroslavich
18	Aleksey Kuleshov	24 February 1979	2.06 m (6 ft 9 in)	96 kg (212 lb)	353 cm (139 in)	344 cm (135 in)	(Russia) Iskra Odintsovo

=== Serbia ===
The following is the Serbian roster in the men's volleyball tournament of the 2008 Summer Olympics.

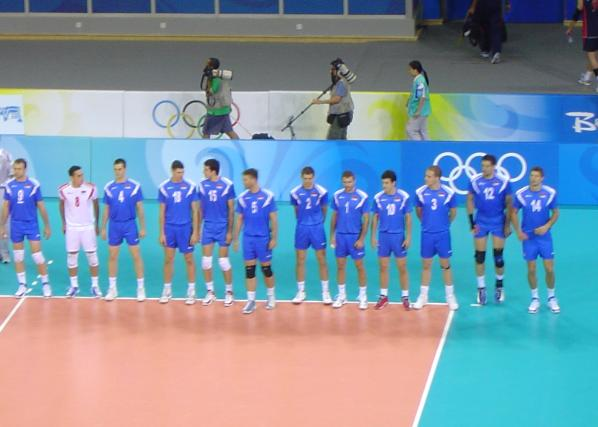
Serbia's team just before the group stage match against Brazil. From left: Grbić, Samardžić, Janić, Podraščanin, Starović, Petković, Bojović, Kovačević, Nikić, Bjelica, Gerić, Miljković.

Head Coach: (Montenegro) Igor Kolaković

No.	Name	Date of birth	Height	Weight	Spike	Block	2008 club
1	Nikola Kovačević	14 February 1983	1.93 m (6 ft 4 in)	78 kg (172 lb)	350 cm (140 in)	340 cm (130 in)	(Italy) RPA Perugia
2	Dejan Bojović	3 April 1983	1.98 m (6 ft 6 in)	86 kg (190 lb)	360 cm (140 in)	345 cm (136 in)	(Italy) Gabeca Montichiari
3	Novica Bjelica	9 February 1983	2.02 m (6 ft 8 in)	97 kg (214 lb)	343 cm (135 in)	324 cm (128 in)	(Italy) Copra Nordmeccanica
4	Bojan Janić	11 March 1982	1.98 m (6 ft 6 in)	83 kg (183 lb)	345 cm (136 in)	322 cm (127 in)	(Italy) Marmi Lanza Verona
5	Vlado Petković	6 January 1983	1.98 m (6 ft 6 in)	97 kg (214 lb)	325 cm (128 in)	318 cm (125 in)	(Montenegro) Budućnost Podgorica
8	Marko Samardžić (L)	22 February 1983	1.90 m (6 ft 3 in)	82 kg (181 lb)	326 cm (128 in)	310 cm (120 in)	(France) Tours VB
9	Nikola Grbić (c)	6 September 1973	1.94 m (6 ft 4 in)	91 kg (201 lb)	346 cm (136 in)	320 cm (130 in)	(Italy) Trentino Volley
10	Miloš Nikić	31 March 1986	1.94 m (6 ft 4 in)	79 kg (174 lb)	350 cm (140 in)	330 cm (130 in)	(Italy) Sparkling Milano
12	Andrija Gerić	24 January 1977	2.03 m (6 ft 8 in)	101 kg (223 lb)	350 cm (140 in)	323 cm (127 in)	(Italy) Lube Banca Marche
14	Ivan Miljković	13 September 1979	2.06 m (6 ft 9 in)	88 kg (194 lb)	354 cm (139 in)	333 cm (131 in)	(Italy) M. Roma Volley
15	Saša Starović	19 October 1988	2.07 m (6 ft 9 in)	89 kg (196 lb)	335 cm (132 in)	321 cm (126 in)	(Montenegro) Budućnost Podgorica
18	Marko Podraščanin	29 August 1987	2.04 m (6 ft 8 in)	92 kg (203 lb)	343 cm (135 in)	326 cm (128 in)	(Italy) Famigliulo Corigliano

== See also ==
- Volleyball at the 2008 Summer Olympics – Women's team rosters
