= 2006 FIVB Volleyball World League squads =

This article show all participating team squads at the 2006 FIVB Volleyball World League, played by 16 countries from 14 July to 27 August 2006. The Final Round was held in Moscow, Russia.

== Argentina ==
The following is the roster in the 2006 FIVB Volleyball World League.

No.	Name	Date of birth	Height	Weight	Spike	Block	2006 club
1	Marcos Milinkovic	22 December 1971	205 cm (6 ft 9 in)	99 kg (218 lb)	355 cm (140 in)	338 cm (133 in)	IBB - TUR
2	Guillermo García	21 September 1983	193 cm (6 ft 4 in)	92 kg (203 lb)	352 cm (139 in)	340 cm (130 in)	Ciudad de Bolívar
4	Nicolas Efron	10 March 1979	198 cm (6 ft 6 in)	92 kg (203 lb)	349 cm (137 in)	320 cm (130 in)	Alianza J. María - ARG
5	Martin Meana	26 April 1982	188 cm (6 ft 2 in)	83 kg (183 lb)	347 cm (137 in)	320 cm (130 in)	UPCN - ARG
6	Gustavo Scholtis	16 December 1982	206 cm (6 ft 9 in)	87 kg (192 lb)	358 cm (141 in)	338 cm (133 in)	La Unión de Formosa Club
7	Ignacio Bernasconi	23 September 1985	195 cm (6 ft 5 in)	75 kg (165 lb)	335 cm (132 in)	323 cm (127 in)	VC Handelsgids - BEL
8	Demián González	21 February 1983	192 cm (6 ft 4 in)	81 kg (179 lb)	328 cm (129 in)	318 cm (125 in)	Brazil Kirin Club
9	Lucas Chávez	3 April 1982	199 cm (6 ft 6 in)	95 kg (209 lb)	335 cm (132 in)	318 cm (125 in)	Guaynabo Mets - PTR
12	Matías Macor	4 June 1980	198 cm (6 ft 6 in)	85 kg (187 lb)	340 cm (130 in)	328 cm (129 in)	Gigantes del Sur - ARG
13	Matías Zublena	14 September 1982	198 cm (6 ft 6 in)	80 kg (180 lb)	320 cm (130 in)	310 cm (120 in)	Boca Juniors - ARG
14	Juan Porello	27 June 1977	195 cm (6 ft 5 in)	98 kg (216 lb)	350 cm (140 in)	330 cm (130 in)	Petrom Ploiesti - ROM
15	Luciano De Cecco	2 June 1988	194 cm (6 ft 4 in)	89 kg (196 lb)	333 cm (131 in)	315 cm (124 in)	Sir Safety Perugia
16	Martin Hernandez	23 March 1985	202 cm (6 ft 8 in)	80 kg (180 lb)	351 cm (138 in)	330 cm (130 in)	Gigantes del Sur - ARG
17	Pablo Meana	10 June 1975	187 cm (6 ft 2 in)	87 kg (192 lb)	325 cm (128 in)	315 cm (124 in)	Drean Bolivar - ARG
18	Gastón Giani	26 April 1979	194 cm (6 ft 4 in)	86 kg (190 lb)	345 cm (136 in)	330 cm (130 in)	Tigre Volley Club - ARG

== Brazil ==
The following is the roster in the 2006 FIVB Volleyball World League.

No.	Name	Date of birth	Height	Weight	Spike	Block	2006 club
1	Bruno Rezende	2 July 1986	190 cm (6 ft 3 in)	76 kg (168 lb)	323 cm (127 in)	302 cm (119 in)	Cimed Florianópolis
2	Marcelo Elgarten	9 November 1974	183 cm (6 ft 0 in)	78 kg (172 lb)	321 cm (126 in)	308 cm (121 in)	Panathinaikos Athens
4	André Heller	17 December 1975	199 cm (6 ft 6 in)	93 kg (205 lb)	339 cm (133 in)	321 cm (126 in)	Trentino Volley
5	Sidnei Santos	9 July 1982	203 cm (6 ft 8 in)	90 kg (200 lb)	348 cm (137 in)	335 cm (132 in)	Cimed Florianópolis
6	Leandro Vissotto Neves	30 April 1983	212 cm (6 ft 11 in)	108 kg (238 lb)	370 cm (150 in)	345 cm (136 in)	Minas Tênis Clube
7	Gilberto Godoy Filho	23 December 1976	192 cm (6 ft 4 in)	85 kg (187 lb)	325 cm (128 in)	312 cm (123 in)	Piemonte Volley
8	Murilo Endres	3 May 1981	190 cm (6 ft 3 in)	76 kg (168 lb)	343 cm (135 in)	319 cm (126 in)	Volley Callipo
9	André Nascimento	4 March 1979	195 cm (6 ft 5 in)	95 kg (209 lb)	340 cm (130 in)	320 cm (130 in)	Trentino Volley
10	Sérgio Dutra Santos	15 October 1975	184 cm (6 ft 0 in)	78 kg (172 lb)	325 cm (128 in)	310 cm (120 in)	Volley Piacenza
11	Anderson Rodrigues	21 May 1974	190 cm (6 ft 3 in)	95 kg (209 lb)	330 cm (130 in)	321 cm (126 in)	Piemonte Volley
12	Samuel Fuchs	4 March 1984	200 cm (6 ft 7 in)	89 kg (196 lb)	342 cm (135 in)	316 cm (124 in)	Minas Tênis Clube
13	Gustavo Endres	23 August 1975	203 cm (6 ft 8 in)	98 kg (216 lb)	337 cm (133 in)	325 cm (128 in)	Volley Treviso
14	Rodrigo Santana	17 April 1979	205 cm (6 ft 9 in)	85 kg (187 lb)	350 cm (140 in)	328 cm (129 in)	Lube Volley
16	Wesley Ribeiro	24 April 1979	190 cm (6 ft 3 in)	82 kg (181 lb)	335 cm (132 in)	319 cm (126 in)	E.C. Pinheiros
17	Ricardo Garcia	19 November 1975	191 cm (6 ft 3 in)	89 kg (196 lb)	337 cm (133 in)	320 cm (130 in)	Modena Volley
18	Dante Amaral	30 September 1980	201 cm (6 ft 7 in)	86 kg (190 lb)	345 cm (136 in)	327 cm (129 in)	Panathinaikos Athens

== Bulgaria ==
The following is the roster in the 2006 FIVB Volleyball World League.

No.	Name	Date of birth	Height	Weight	Spike	Block	2006 club
3	Andrey Zhekov	12 March 1980	190 cm (6 ft 3 in)	82 kg (181 lb)	340 cm (130 in)	326 cm (128 in)	Tomis
4	Boyan Yordanov	12 March 1983	197 cm (6 ft 6 in)	86 kg (190 lb)	358 cm (141 in)	335 cm (132 in)	Pallavolo Genova
6	Matey Kaziyski	23 September 1984	203 cm (6 ft 8 in)	93 kg (205 lb)	370 cm (150 in)	335 cm (132 in)	Al-Rayyan Sports Club
7	Svetozar Ivanov	28 October 1977	208 cm (6 ft 10 in)	100 kg (220 lb)	347 cm (137 in)	336 cm (132 in)	CSKA
8	Danail Mihaylov	1 July 1974	197 cm (6 ft 6 in)	87 kg (192 lb)	338 cm (133 in)	325 cm (128 in)	Halk Bankasi Sporkulubu
11	Vladimir Nikolov	3 October 1977	200 cm (6 ft 7 in)	95 kg (209 lb)	345 cm (136 in)	325 cm (128 in)	ASU Lyon
12	Teodor Bogdanov	29 January 1986	207 cm (6 ft 9 in)	90 kg (200 lb)	360 cm (140 in)	340 cm (130 in)	Levski Siconco
13	Teodor Salparov	16 August 1982	187 cm (6 ft 2 in)	77 kg (170 lb)	320 cm (130 in)	305 cm (120 in)	Zenit
15	Krasimir Gaydarski	23 February 1983	204 cm (6 ft 8 in)	96 kg (212 lb)	350 cm (140 in)	330 cm (130 in)	SCC Berlin
16	Todor Aleksiev	21 April 1983	204 cm (6 ft 8 in)	105 kg (231 lb)	355 cm (140 in)	340 cm (130 in)	Gazprom - Ugra Surgut
17	Plamen Konstantinov	14 June 1973	202 cm (6 ft 8 in)	93 kg (205 lb)	350 cm (140 in)	330 cm (130 in)	Iraklis THESSALONIKI
18	Nikolay Nikolov	29 July 1986	206 cm (6 ft 9 in)	97 kg (214 lb)	350 cm (140 in)	332 cm (131 in)	Shahrdari Urmia

== China ==
The following is the roster in the 2006 FIVB Volleyball World League.

No.	Name	Date of birth	Height	Weight	Spike	Block	2006 club
1	Guo Song	1 March 1982	206 cm (6 ft 9 in)	94 kg (207 lb)	350 cm (140 in)	340 cm (130 in)	Beijing Club
2	Hu Song	21 February 1983	198 cm (6 ft 6 in)	75 kg (165 lb)	350 cm (140 in)	340 cm (130 in)	Beijing
3	Cui Xiaodong	17 November 1980	205 cm (6 ft 9 in)	80 kg (180 lb)	355 cm (140 in)	345 cm (136 in)	Shanghai
4	Yuan Zhi	29 September 1981	194 cm (6 ft 4 in)	95 kg (209 lb)	348 cm (137 in)	334 cm (131 in)	Liaoning
5	Guo Peng	1 July 1982	200 cm (6 ft 7 in)	84 kg (185 lb)	360 cm (140 in)	337 cm (133 in)	Army
6	Wang Haichuan	11 November 1979	200 cm (6 ft 7 in)	80 kg (180 lb)	355 cm (140 in)	340 cm (130 in)	Liaoning
7	Tang Miao	4 May 1982	204 cm (6 ft 8 in)	85 kg (187 lb)	355 cm (140 in)	345 cm (136 in)	Shanghai
8	Kang Kang	21 November 1984	195 cm (6 ft 5 in)	84 kg (185 lb)	341 cm (134 in)	332 cm (131 in)	Beijing Club
9	Zhou Hong	1 October 1987	200 cm (6 ft 7 in)	75 kg (165 lb)	340 cm (130 in)	325 cm (128 in)	Jiangsu
10	Li Chun	1 April 1982	190 cm (6 ft 3 in)	82 kg (181 lb)	348 cm (137 in)	332 cm (131 in)	Army
11	Yu Dawei	21 June 1984	199 cm (6 ft 6 in)	90 kg (200 lb)	345 cm (136 in)	335 cm (132 in)	Shandong
12	Shen Qiong	5 September 1981	198 cm (6 ft 6 in)	84 kg (185 lb)	359 cm (141 in)	349 cm (137 in)	Shanghai
14	Wang Jin	2 May 1976	202 cm (6 ft 8 in)	85 kg (187 lb)	350 cm (140 in)	338 cm (133 in)	Henan
15	Chu Hui	11 February 1981	187 cm (6 ft 2 in)	70 kg (150 lb)	355 cm (140 in)	323 cm (127 in)	Beijing
16	Ren Qi	24 February 1984	174 cm (5 ft 9 in)	70 kg (150 lb)	322 cm (127 in)	312 cm (123 in)	Shanghai
17	Sui Shengsheng	30 May 1980	192 cm (6 ft 4 in)	75 kg (165 lb)	345 cm (136 in)	334 cm (131 in)	Liaoning
18	Zhang Xiang	30 May 1971	192 cm (6 ft 4 in)	85 kg (187 lb)	350 cm (140 in)	340 cm (130 in)	Sichuan

== Cuba ==
The following is the roster in the 2006 FIVB Volleyball World League.

No.	Name	Date of birth	Height	Weight	Spike	Block	2006 club
1	Raidel Poey Romero	20 February 1982	198 cm (6 ft 6 in)	82 kg (181 lb)	360 cm (140 in)	340 cm (130 in)	Ciudad Habana
2	Tomás Aldazabal M.	30 May 1976	193 cm (6 ft 4 in)	83 kg (183 lb)	360 cm (140 in)	340 cm (130 in)	Ciudad Habana
3	Jorge Luis Sanchez Salgado	23 March 1985	198 cm (6 ft 6 in)	79 kg (174 lb)	345 cm (136 in)	330 cm (130 in)	La Habana
4	Yasser Portuondo	2 February 1983	196 cm (6 ft 5 in)	90 kg (200 lb)	351 cm (138 in)	319 cm (126 in)	Ciudad Habana
6	Keibel Gutierrez Torna	6 May 1987	178 cm (5 ft 10 in)	80 kg (180 lb)	305 cm (120 in)	295 cm (116 in)	Villa Clara
8	Pavel Pimienta Allen	3 August 1976	204 cm (6 ft 8 in)	96 kg (212 lb)	365 cm (144 in)	340 cm (130 in)	Camaguey
9	Michael Sánchez Bozhulev	5 June 1986	206 cm (6 ft 9 in)	100 kg (220 lb)	365 cm (144 in)	340 cm (130 in)	Al-Rayyan Sports Club
10	Dariel Garcia Cortina	13 June 1981	199 cm (6 ft 6 in)	91 kg (201 lb)	362 cm (143 in)	334 cm (131 in)	Ciudad Habana
11	Gonzalez Raidel Delgado	8 September 1987	195 cm (6 ft 5 in)	81 kg (179 lb)	347 cm (137 in)	330 cm (130 in)	La Habana
12	Yenry Bell Cisnero	27 July 1981	188 cm (6 ft 2 in)	84 kg (185 lb)	358 cm (141 in)	328 cm (129 in)	Santiago de Cuba
13	Roberlandy Simon Aties	11 June 1987	206 cm (6 ft 9 in)	91 kg (201 lb)	358 cm (141 in)	326 cm (128 in)	Ciudad Habana
14	Ariel Gil	3 August 1983	200 cm (6 ft 7 in)	90 kg (200 lb)	362 cm (143 in)	328 cm (129 in)	Matanzas
15	Oreol Camejo Durruthy	22 July 1986	207 cm (6 ft 9 in)	94 kg (207 lb)	354 cm (139 in)	326 cm (128 in)	LOKOMOTIV NOVOSIBIRSK
16	Maikel Bastida	1 March 1983	195 cm (6 ft 5 in)	91 kg (201 lb)	342 cm (135 in)	325 cm (128 in)	Villa Clara
17	Odelvis Dominico Speck	6 May 1977	205 cm (6 ft 9 in)	87 kg (192 lb)	360 cm (140 in)	356 cm (140 in)	Ciudad Habana
18	Yosmany Díaz Carmenate	8 January 1988	196 cm (6 ft 5 in)	89 kg (196 lb)	358 cm (141 in)	328 cm (129 in)	Ciudad Habana

== Egypt ==
The following is the roster in the 2006 FIVB Volleyball World League.

No.	Name	Date of birth	Height	Weight	Spike	Block	2006 club
1	Hamdy Awad	14 April 1972	202 cm (6 ft 8 in)	105 kg (231 lb)	346 cm (136 in)	327 cm (129 in)	AHLY
2	Abdallah Bekhit	10 October 1983	198 cm (6 ft 6 in)	72 kg (159 lb)	352 cm (139 in)	331 cm (130 in)	AHLY
3	Mohamed Gabal	21 January 1984	195 cm (6 ft 5 in)	97 kg (214 lb)	345 cm (136 in)	320 cm (130 in)	El Gaish
4	Ahmed Abdelhay	19 August 1984	197 cm (6 ft 6 in)	87 kg (192 lb)	342 cm (135 in)	316 cm (124 in)	ARMY CLUB
5	Ossama Bekheit	12 January 1977	192 cm (6 ft 4 in)	72 kg (159 lb)	335 cm (132 in)	326 cm (128 in)	AHLY
6	Wael Alaydy	8 December 1971	178 cm (5 ft 10 in)	78 kg (172 lb)	320 cm (130 in)	300 cm (120 in)	ZAMALEK
7	Ashraf Abouelhassan	17 May 1975	186 cm (6 ft 1 in)	86 kg (190 lb)	325 cm (128 in)	318 cm (125 in)	ZAMALEK
8	Saleh Youssef	25 July 1982	194 cm (6 ft 4 in)	91 kg (201 lb)	345 cm (136 in)	332 cm (131 in)	Zamalek
9	Mohamed El Mahdy	2 September 1978	196 cm (6 ft 5 in)	96 kg (212 lb)	340 cm (130 in)	335 cm (132 in)	AHLY
10	Mahmoud Elkoumy	19 October 1983	196 cm (6 ft 5 in)	80 kg (180 lb)	330 cm (130 in)	326 cm (128 in)	AHLY
11	Mohamed Elnafrawy	9 June 1983	200 cm (6 ft 7 in)	92 kg (203 lb)	335 cm (132 in)	320 cm (130 in)	AHLY
13	Mohamed Badawy	11 January 1986	197 cm (6 ft 6 in)	97 kg (214 lb)	351 cm (138 in)	343 cm (135 in)	ZAMALEK
14	Hossameldin Gomaa	15 February 1984	199 cm (6 ft 6 in)	92 kg (203 lb)	344 cm (135 in)	324 cm (128 in)	AHLY
15	Aly Elian	1 February 1983	204 cm (6 ft 8 in)	91 kg (201 lb)	350 cm (140 in)	340 cm (130 in)	ZAMALEK
16	Mohamed Seif Elnasr	5 September 1983	202 cm (6 ft 8 in)	89 kg (196 lb)	345 cm (136 in)	339 cm (133 in)	ZAMALEK
17	Mahmoud Abd El kader	12 May 1985	195 cm (6 ft 5 in)	94 kg (207 lb)	342 cm (135 in)	316 cm (124 in)	AHLY
18	Ahmed Rayan	16 March 1982	198 cm (6 ft 6 in)	81 kg (179 lb)	340 cm (130 in)	330 cm (130 in)	ZAMALEK

== Finland ==
The following is the roster in the 2006 FIVB Volleyball World League.

No.	Name	Date of birth	Height	Weight	Spike	Block	2006 club
1	Tapio Kangasniemi	7 March 1979	186 cm (6 ft 1 in)	87 kg (192 lb)	335 cm (132 in)	300 cm (120 in)	Tampereen Isku-Volley (FIN)
2	Jukka Lehtonen	22 February 1982	197 cm (6 ft 6 in)	90 kg (200 lb)	346 cm (136 in)	325 cm (128 in)	LEKA Volley (FIN)
3	Mikko Esko	3 September 1978	198 cm (6 ft 6 in)	89 kg (196 lb)	331 cm (130 in)	319 cm (126 in)	Nizhni Novgorod (RUS)
4	Simo-Pekka Olli	13 November 1985	204 cm (6 ft 8 in)	100 kg (220 lb)	343 cm (135 in)	330 cm (130 in)	Raision Loimu (FIN)
5	Mika Pyrhönen	23 August 1975	197 cm (6 ft 6 in)	95 kg (209 lb)	335 cm (132 in)	310 cm (120 in)	Tampereen Isku-Volley
6	Tuomas Sammelvuo	16 February 1976	192 cm (6 ft 4 in)	90 kg (200 lb)	341 cm (134 in)	315 cm (124 in)	San Giustino (ITA)
7	Matti Hietanen	3 January 1983	199 cm (6 ft 6 in)	93 kg (205 lb)	350 cm (140 in)	320 cm (130 in)	Gdansk (POL)
8	Mikko Oivanen	26 May 1986	198 cm (6 ft 6 in)	92 kg (203 lb)	360 cm (140 in)	320 cm (130 in)	Czarni Radom (POL)
9	Teppo Heikkilä	10 March 1983	187 cm (6 ft 2 in)	77 kg (170 lb)	336 cm (132 in)	313 cm (123 in)	Kempeleen Lentopallo (FIN)
10	Henri Tuomi	14 December 1982	196 cm (6 ft 5 in)	93 kg (205 lb)	345 cm (136 in)	320 cm (130 in)	Raision Loimu (FIN)
11	Miika Heikkinen	6 August 1977	200 cm (6 ft 7 in)	94 kg (207 lb)	350 cm (140 in)	325 cm (128 in)	Innsbruck (AUT)
12	Olli Kunnari	2 February 1982	197 cm (6 ft 6 in)	85 kg (187 lb)	342 cm (135 in)	315 cm (124 in)	Vammalan Lentopallo (FIN)
14	Konstantin Shumov	15 February 1985	205 cm (6 ft 9 in)	98 kg (216 lb)	351 cm (138 in)	331 cm (130 in)	Treia (ITA)
15	Matti Oivanen	26 May 1986	198 cm (6 ft 6 in)	90 kg (200 lb)	355 cm (140 in)	320 cm (130 in)	Hurrikaani-Loimaa (FIN)
16	Urpo Sivula	15 March 1988	195 cm (6 ft 5 in)	100 kg (220 lb)	350 cm (140 in)	330 cm (130 in)	Raision Loimu (FIN)
17	Joni Markkula	10 February 1983	192 cm (6 ft 4 in)	84 kg (185 lb)	330 cm (130 in)	311 cm (122 in)	Vammalan Lentopallo (FIN)
18	Antti Siltala	14 March 1984	193 cm (6 ft 4 in)	90 kg (200 lb)	348 cm (137 in)	330 cm (130 in)	Jenisei Krasnojarsk (RUS)

== France ==
The following is the roster in the 2006 FIVB Volleyball World League.

No.	Name	Date of birth	Height	Weight	Spike	Block	2006 club
1	Xavier Kapfer	7 November 1981	191 cm (6 ft 3 in)	96 kg (212 lb)	354 cm (139 in)	320 cm (130 in)	Fart Kielce
2	Hubert Henno	6 October 1976	188 cm (6 ft 2 in)	83 kg (183 lb)	330 cm (130 in)	310 cm (120 in)	Macerata
3	Gérald Hardy-Dessources	9 February 1983	197 cm (6 ft 6 in)	93 kg (205 lb)	360 cm (140 in)	335 cm (132 in)	Tours VB
4	Sebastien Ruette	22 June 1977	201 cm (6 ft 7 in)	93 kg (205 lb)	362 cm (143 in)	330 cm (130 in)	Tours VB
5	Junot Mistoco	16 August 1979	197 cm (6 ft 6 in)	92 kg (203 lb)	353 cm (139 in)	326 cm (128 in)	Arago de Sète
7	Stéphane Antiga	3 February 1976	200 cm (6 ft 7 in)	94 kg (207 lb)	347 cm (137 in)	327 cm (129 in)	PGE Skra
8	Ludovic Castard	18 January 1983	197 cm (6 ft 6 in)	95 kg (209 lb)	348 cm (137 in)	325 cm (128 in)	AS Cannes
9	Frantz Granvorka	10 March 1976	195 cm (6 ft 5 in)	90 kg (200 lb)	364 cm (143 in)	327 cm (129 in)	Tarente
10	Vincent Montmeat	1 September 1977	196 cm (6 ft 5 in)	88 kg (194 lb)	348 cm (137 in)	330 cm (130 in)	Tourcoing
11	Loïc Le Marrec	1 March 1977	190 cm (6 ft 3 in)	82 kg (181 lb)	330 cm (130 in)	312 cm (123 in)	Tours VB
13	Pierre Pujol	13 July 1984	186 cm (6 ft 1 in)	90 kg (200 lb)	335 cm (132 in)	315 cm (124 in)	AS Cannes
14	Philippe Barca-Cysique	22 April 1977	195 cm (6 ft 5 in)	89 kg (196 lb)	347 cm (137 in)	325 cm (128 in)	Paykan
15	Guillaume Samica	28 September 1981	198 cm (6 ft 6 in)	88 kg (194 lb)	355 cm (140 in)	327 cm (129 in)	Zaksa
16	Bertrand Carletti	19 April 1982	205 cm (6 ft 9 in)	97 kg (214 lb)	348 cm (137 in)	323 cm (127 in)	Trévise
17	Oliver Kieffer	27 August 1979	200 cm (6 ft 7 in)	85 kg (187 lb)	355 cm (140 in)	335 cm (132 in)	Stade Poitevin
18	Jean-François Exiga	9 March 1982	176 cm (5 ft 9 in)	75 kg (165 lb)	320 cm (130 in)	312 cm (123 in)	Tours VB

== Italy ==
The following is the roster in the 2006 FIVB Volleyball World League.

No.	Name	Date of birth	Height	Weight	Spike	Block	2006 club
1	Luigi Mastrangelo	17 August 1975	202 cm (6 ft 8 in)	90 kg (200 lb)	368 cm (145 in)	336 cm (132 in)	Bre banca Lannuti Cuneo
3	Giacomo Sintini	16 January 1979	196 cm (6 ft 5 in)	85 kg (187 lb)	320 cm (130 in)	305 cm (120 in)	Trentino Volley
4	Dario Messana	25 May 1979	188 cm (6 ft 2 in)	82 kg (181 lb)	340 cm (130 in)	310 cm (120 in)	RPA
5	Valerio Vermiglio	1 March 1976	193 cm (6 ft 4 in)	85 kg (187 lb)	342 cm (135 in)	320 cm (130 in)	ZENIT Kazan
6	Samuele Papi	20 May 1973	190 cm (6 ft 3 in)	84 kg (185 lb)	345 cm (136 in)	310 cm (120 in)	Copra Elior Piacenza
7	Alessandro Paparoni	17 August 1981	191 cm (6 ft 3 in)	75 kg (165 lb)	340 cm (130 in)	314 cm (124 in)	Lube Banca Marche
8	Alberto Cisolla	10 October 1977	197 cm (6 ft 6 in)	86 kg (190 lb)	367 cm (144 in)	345 cm (136 in)	Sisley
10	Luca Tencati	16 March 1979	200 cm (6 ft 7 in)	97 kg (214 lb)	350 cm (140 in)	330 cm (130 in)	Cimone
12	Mirko Corsano	28 October 1973	190 cm (6 ft 3 in)	87 kg (192 lb)	342 cm (135 in)	303 cm (119 in)	Lube Banca Marche
13	Leonardo Morsut	29 September 1980	199 cm (6 ft 6 in)	93 kg (205 lb)	350 cm (140 in)	325 cm (128 in)	Itas Trentino
14	Alessandro Fei	29 November 1978	204 cm (6 ft 8 in)	90 kg (200 lb)	358 cm (141 in)	336 cm (132 in)	Copra Elior Piacenza
16	Michal Lasko	11 March 1981	202 cm (6 ft 8 in)	104 kg (229 lb)	348 cm (137 in)	337 cm (133 in)	Jastrzebski Wegel
18	Matej Cernic	13 September 1978	192 cm (6 ft 4 in)	80 kg (180 lb)	354 cm (139 in)	335 cm (132 in)	Assecco Resovia

== Japan ==
The following is the roster in the 2006 FIVB Volleyball World League.

No.	Name	Date of birth	Height	Weight	Spike	Block	2006 club
2	Keisuke Kurihara	9 October 1976	178 cm (5 ft 10 in)	69 kg (152 lb)	320 cm (130 in)	310 cm (120 in)	Suntory Sunbirds
4	Kenji Onoue	12 May 1978	198 cm (6 ft 6 in)	85 kg (187 lb)	340 cm (130 in)	330 cm (130 in)	JT Thunders
5	Yohei Takasugi	4 February 1978	194 cm (6 ft 4 in)	90 kg (200 lb)	340 cm (130 in)	325 cm (128 in)	Toray Arrows
6	Ryuji Naohiro	1 October 1978	198 cm (6 ft 6 in)	84 kg (185 lb)	350 cm (140 in)	340 cm (130 in)	JT Thunders
7	Takahiro Yamamoto	12 July 1978	201 cm (6 ft 7 in)	98 kg (216 lb)	345 cm (136 in)	335 cm (132 in)	Panasonic Panthers
8	Masaji Ogino	8 January 1970	197 cm (6 ft 6 in)	98 kg (216 lb)	340 cm (130 in)	320 cm (130 in)	Suntory Sunbirds
9	Akira Masuno	6 July 1978	170 cm (5 ft 7 in)	66 kg (146 lb)	310 cm (120 in)	300 cm (120 in)	Sakai Blazers
10	Osamu Tanabe	10 April 1979	181 cm (5 ft 11 in)	73 kg (161 lb)	330 cm (130 in)	300 cm (120 in)	Toray Arrows
11	Yoshihiko Matsumoto	7 January 1981	193 cm (6 ft 4 in)	80 kg (180 lb)	340 cm (130 in)	330 cm (130 in)	Sakai Blazers
12	Kota Yamamura	20 October 1980	205 cm (6 ft 9 in)	95 kg (209 lb)	350 cm (140 in)	335 cm (132 in)	Suntory Sunbirds
14	Yoshifumi Suzuki	31 March 1983	200 cm (6 ft 7 in)	95 kg (209 lb)	340 cm (130 in)	300 cm (120 in)	Suntory Sunbirds
15	Katsutoshi Tsumagari	2 November 1975	183 cm (6 ft 0 in)	78 kg (172 lb)	320 cm (130 in)	305 cm (120 in)	Suntory Sunbirds
16	Yusuke Ishijima	9 January 1984	197 cm (6 ft 6 in)	102 kg (225 lb)	345 cm (136 in)	335 cm (132 in)	Sakai Blazers
17	Yu Koshikawa	30 June 1984	189 cm (6 ft 2 in)	87 kg (192 lb)	340 cm (130 in)	320 cm (130 in)	JT Thunders
18	Kosuke Tomonaga	22 July 1980	184 cm (6 ft 0 in)	83 kg (183 lb)	320 cm (130 in)	310 cm (120 in)	Sakai Blazers

== South Korea ==
The following is the roster in the 2006 FIVB Volleyball World League.

No.	Name	Date of birth	Height	Weight	Spike	Block	2006 club
1	Lee Hyung-Doo	11 May 1980	190 cm (6 ft 3 in)	76 kg (168 lb)	313 cm (123 in)	311 cm (122 in)	Samsung fire&Marine Insurance
2	Oh Jung-Rok	14 June 1980	170 cm (5 ft 7 in)	67 kg (148 lb)	270 cm (110 in)	261 cm (103 in)	Hyundai Capital co.
3	Kwon Young-Min	5 July 1980	190 cm (6 ft 3 in)	82 kg (181 lb)	315 cm (124 in)	309 cm (122 in)	Hyundai Capital Co.
4	Moon Sung-Min	14 September 1986	198 cm (6 ft 6 in)	89 kg (196 lb)	329 cm (130 in)	321 cm (126 in)	Hyundai Capital Co.
5	Yeo Oh-Hyun	2 September 1978	175 cm (5 ft 9 in)	70 kg (150 lb)	280 cm (110 in)	279 cm (110 in)	Hyundai Capital
6	Choi Tae-Woong	9 April 1976	185 cm (6 ft 1 in)	80 kg (180 lb)	315 cm (124 in)	302 cm (119 in)	Hyundai Capital
7	Lee Sun-Kyu	14 March 1981	199 cm (6 ft 6 in)	90 kg (200 lb)	325 cm (128 in)	320 cm (130 in)	Samsung Fire & Marine Insurance
8	Ha Hyun-Yong	9 May 1982	198 cm (6 ft 6 in)	88 kg (194 lb)	330 cm (130 in)	322 cm (127 in)	LIG Insurance
9	Who In-Jung	19 April 1974	198 cm (6 ft 6 in)	86 kg (190 lb)	339 cm (133 in)	330 cm (130 in)	Hyundai Capital co.
10	Yun Bong-Woo	20 January 1982	199 cm (6 ft 6 in)	88 kg (194 lb)	332 cm (131 in)	320 cm (130 in)	Hyundai Capital co.
11	Lee Kyung-Soo	27 April 1979	198 cm (6 ft 6 in)	90 kg (200 lb)	332 cm (131 in)	315 cm (124 in)	LIG Insurance
12	Jang Yeong-Ki	26 June 1980	187 cm (6 ft 2 in)	81 kg (179 lb)	320 cm (130 in)	309 cm (122 in)	Hyundai Capital co.
13	Park Chul-Woo	25 July 1985	198 cm (6 ft 6 in)	88 kg (194 lb)	332 cm (131 in)	319 cm (126 in)	Samsung Fire&Marine Insurance
14	Kim Yo-han	16 August 1985	200 cm (6 ft 7 in)	95 kg (209 lb)	335 cm (132 in)	326 cm (128 in)	LIG Insurance
15	Kang Dong-Jin	31 August 1983	192 cm (6 ft 4 in)	86 kg (190 lb)	322 cm (127 in)	311 cm (122 in)	Korean Airlines co.
16	Song Byung-Il	3 April 1983	196 cm (6 ft 5 in)	85 kg (187 lb)	317 cm (125 in)	297 cm (117 in)	Woori Capital
17	Ha Kyoung-Min	27 July 1982	201 cm (6 ft 7 in)	83 kg (183 lb)	320 cm (130 in)	310 cm (120 in)	Kepco 45
18	Chang Byung-Chul	15 August 1976	195 cm (6 ft 5 in)	85 kg (187 lb)	325 cm (128 in)	316 cm (124 in)	Samsung fire&Marine Insurance

== Portugal ==
The following is the roster in the 2006 FIVB Volleyball World League.

No.	Name	Date of birth	Height	Weight	Spike	Block	2006 club
2	Frederico Siqueira	5 April 1983	206 cm (6 ft 9 in)	105 kg (231 lb)	350 cm (140 in)	348 cm (137 in)	VC Argez Duvel Puurs
6	Pedro Sousa	26 September 1987	191 cm (6 ft 3 in)	81 kg (179 lb)	327 cm (129 in)	315 cm (124 in)	Vitória S.C.
7	Alexandre Castro	3 March 1980	191 cm (6 ft 3 in)	95 kg (209 lb)	327 cm (129 in)	295 cm (116 in)	Leixões S.C.
9	Luis A. Sousa Pinto	5 August 1976	188 cm (6 ft 2 in)	80 kg (180 lb)	316 cm (124 in)	295 cm (116 in)	Esmoriz G.C.
17	Hugo Ribeiro	15 November 1977	180 cm (5 ft 11 in)	80 kg (180 lb)	315 cm (124 in)	300 cm (120 in)	Esmoriz GC

== Serbia and Montenegro ==
The following is the roster in the 2006 FIVB Volleyball World League.

No.	Name	Date of birth	Height	Weight	Spike	Block	2006 club
3	Branko Roljic	28 September 1981	199 cm (6 ft 6 in)	95 kg (209 lb)	339 cm (133 in)	320 cm (130 in)	Halkbank Ankara (TUR)
4	Bojan Janic	11 March 1982	198 cm (6 ft 6 in)	83 kg (183 lb)	345 cm (136 in)	322 cm (127 in)	Trefl Pilka Siatkowa (POL)
6	Slobodan Boskan	18 August 1975	197 cm (6 ft 6 in)	87 kg (192 lb)	343 cm (135 in)	320 cm (130 in)	Tours VB Tours (FRA)
7	Dragan Stankovic	18 October 1985	205 cm (6 ft 9 in)	94 kg (207 lb)	343 cm (135 in)	333 cm (131 in)	Lube Banka Macerata (ITA)
8	Marko Samardzic	22 February 1983	190 cm (6 ft 3 in)	82 kg (181 lb)	326 cm (128 in)	310 cm (120 in)	Trefl Pilka Siatkowa (POL)
9	Nikola Grbic	6 September 1973	194 cm (6 ft 4 in)	91 kg (201 lb)	346 cm (136 in)	320 cm (130 in)	Itas Diatec Trentino (ITA)
10	Vladimir Grbic	14 December 1970	193 cm (6 ft 4 in)	87 kg (192 lb)	360 cm (140 in)	350 cm (140 in)	TOP Volley Latina (ITA)
13	Goran Vujevic	27 February 1973	192 cm (6 ft 4 in)	94 kg (207 lb)	339 cm (133 in)	315 cm (124 in)	Perugia Volley (ITA)
15	Veljko Petkovic	23 January 1977	199 cm (6 ft 6 in)	96 kg (212 lb)	329 cm (130 in)	310 cm (120 in)	Olympiakos Athens (GRE)
16	Ivan Ilic	25 January 1988	191 cm (6 ft 3 in)	82 kg (181 lb)	327 cm (129 in)	305 cm (120 in)	Mladi Radnik Pozarevac
18	Andjelko Dangubic	6 September 1983	209 cm (6 ft 10 in)	90 kg (200 lb)	335 cm (132 in)	326 cm (128 in)	Buducnost Podgorica

== Russia ==
The following is the roster in the 2006 FIVB Volleyball World League.

No.	Name	Date of birth	Height	Weight	Spike	Block	2006 club
1	Alexander Korneev	11 September 1980	200 cm (6 ft 7 in)	96 kg (212 lb)	348 cm (137 in)	339 cm (133 in)	Dinamo Moscow
2	Pavel Kruglov	17 September 1985	205 cm (6 ft 9 in)	98 kg (216 lb)	351 cm (138 in)	342 cm (135 in)	Dinamo
3	Alexander Volkov	14 February 1985	210 cm (6 ft 11 in)	90 kg (200 lb)	360 cm (140 in)	335 cm (132 in)	ZENIT Kazan
4	Taras Khtey	22 May 1982	205 cm (6 ft 9 in)	109 kg (240 lb)	351 cm (138 in)	339 cm (133 in)	Belogorie
5	Pavel Abramov	23 April 1979	200 cm (6 ft 7 in)	87 kg (192 lb)	347 cm (137 in)	336 cm (132 in)	Iskra
8	Sergey Tetyukhin	23 September 1975	197 cm (6 ft 6 in)	89 kg (196 lb)	345 cm (136 in)	338 cm (133 in)	Belogorie
11	Konstantin Ushakov	24 March 1970	198 cm (6 ft 6 in)	77 kg (170 lb)	343 cm (135 in)	332 cm (131 in)	Kuzbass
12	Sergey Baranov	10 August 1981	208 cm (6 ft 10 in)	109 kg (240 lb)	356 cm (140 in)	343 cm (135 in)	Lokomotiv
14	Alexander Abrosimov	25 August 1983	207 cm (6 ft 9 in)	98 kg (216 lb)	341 cm (134 in)	325 cm (128 in)	Lokomotiv
15	Artem Ermakov	16 March 1982	188 cm (6 ft 2 in)	80 kg (180 lb)	323 cm (127 in)	313 cm (123 in)	Dinamo
17	Sergey Makarov	28 March 1980	196 cm (6 ft 5 in)	97 kg (214 lb)	337 cm (133 in)	329 cm (130 in)	Kuzbass

== United States ==
The following is the roster in the 2006 FIVB Volleyball World League.

No.	Name	Date of birth	Height	Weight	Spike	Block	2006 club
1	David Lee	8 March 1982	203 cm (6 ft 8 in)	105 kg (231 lb)	350 cm (140 in)	325 cm (128 in)	Lokomotiv Nobosibirsk
4	Christopher Tamas	27 January 1981	195 cm (6 ft 5 in)	95 kg (209 lb)	351 cm (138 in)	332 cm (131 in)	Reyal Voley Guadalajara
5	Richard Lambourne	6 May 1975	190 cm (6 ft 3 in)	90 kg (200 lb)	324 cm (128 in)	312 cm (123 in)	USA Men's Volleyball Team
6	Phillip Eatherton	2 January 1974	206 cm (6 ft 9 in)	101 kg (223 lb)	356 cm (140 in)	335 cm (132 in)	AZS Czestochowa
8	William Reid Priddy	1 October 1977	194 cm (6 ft 4 in)	89 kg (196 lb)	353 cm (139 in)	330 cm (130 in)	USA Men's Volleyball Team
9	Ryan Millar	22 January 1978	204 cm (6 ft 8 in)	98 kg (216 lb)	354 cm (139 in)	326 cm (128 in)	Lokomotiv Nobosibirsk
10	Riley Salmon	2 July 1976	198 cm (6 ft 6 in)	89 kg (196 lb)	345 cm (136 in)	331 cm (130 in)	Corozal Plataneros
11	Brook Billings	30 April 1980	196 cm (6 ft 5 in)	95 kg (209 lb)	351 cm (138 in)	331 cm (130 in)	Fenerbahce
12	Thomas Hoff	9 June 1973	198 cm (6 ft 6 in)	94 kg (207 lb)	353 cm (139 in)	333 cm (131 in)	USA Men's Volleyball Team
13	Clayton Stanley	20 January 1978	205 cm (6 ft 9 in)	104 kg (229 lb)	357 cm (141 in)	332 cm (131 in)	Ural UFA
14	Kevin Hansen	19 March 1982	196 cm (6 ft 5 in)	93 kg (205 lb)	349 cm (137 in)	330 cm (130 in)	Arkas Spor
15	Gabriel Gardner	18 March 1976	209 cm (6 ft 10 in)	103 kg (227 lb)	353 cm (139 in)	335 cm (132 in)	USA Men's Volleyball Team
16	David McKienzie	5 July 1979	193 cm (6 ft 4 in)	95 kg (209 lb)	358 cm (141 in)	340 cm (130 in)	Kuwait Sporting Club
17	Delano Thomas	26 January 1983	201 cm (6 ft 7 in)	95 kg (209 lb)	366 cm (144 in)	339 cm (133 in)	ACH Volley
