= 2011 FIVB Volleyball Men's World Cup squads =

Men's volleyball world cup team list

This article shows all participating team squads at the 2011 FIVB Volleyball Men's World Cup.

== Argentina ==
The following is the roster in the 2011 FIVB Volleyball World League.

No.	Name	Date of birth	Height	Weight	Spike	Block
2	Ivan Castellani	19 January 1991	196 cm (6 ft 5 in)	82 kg (181 lb)	336 cm (132 in)	320 cm (130 in)
7	Facundo Conte	25 August 1989	198 cm (6 ft 6 in)	90 kg (200 lb)	355 cm (140 in)	326 cm (128 in)
8	Maximiliano Cavanna	2 July 1988	185 cm (6 ft 1 in)	79 kg (174 lb)	314 cm (124 in)	300 cm (120 in)
9	Rodrigo Quiroga	23 March 1987	190 cm (6 ft 3 in)	86 kg (190 lb)	345 cm (136 in)	321 cm (126 in)
10	Nicolas Bruno	24 February 1989	187 cm (6 ft 2 in)	83 kg (183 lb)	338 cm (133 in)	308 cm (121 in)
11	Sebastian Solé	12 June 1991	202 cm (6 ft 8 in)	88 kg (194 lb)	360 cm (140 in)	328 cm (129 in)
12	Federico Pereyra	19 June 1988	200 cm (6 ft 7 in)	99 kg (218 lb)	335 cm (132 in)	325 cm (128 in)
13	Cristian Poglajen	14 July 1989	195 cm (6 ft 5 in)	93 kg (205 lb)	346 cm (136 in)	320 cm (130 in)
14	Pablo Crer	12 June 1989	205 cm (6 ft 9 in)	78 kg (172 lb)	350 cm (140 in)	330 cm (130 in)
15	Luciano De Cecco	2 June 1988	194 cm (6 ft 4 in)	89 kg (196 lb)	333 cm (131 in)	315 cm (124 in)
16	Alexis González	21 July 1981	184 cm (6 ft 0 in)	83 kg (183 lb)	321 cm (126 in)	300 cm (120 in)
17	Mariano Giustiniano	4 April 1986	189 cm (6 ft 2 in)	91 kg (201 lb)	335 cm (132 in)	318 cm (125 in)
18	Franco López	4 February 1989	187 cm (6 ft 2 in)	79 kg (174 lb)	326 cm (128 in)	304 cm (120 in)
19	Maximiliano Gauna	20 April 1989	197 cm (6 ft 6 in)	93 kg (205 lb)	338 cm (133 in)	320 cm (130 in)

== Brazil ==
The following is the roster in the 2011 FIVB Volleyball World League.

No.	Name	Date of birth	Height	Weight	Spike	Block
1	Bruno Rezende	2 July 1986	190 cm (6 ft 3 in)	76 kg (168 lb)	323 cm (127 in)	302 cm (119 in)
4	Wallace De Souza	26 June 1987	198 cm (6 ft 6 in)	87 kg (192 lb)	344 cm (135 in)	318 cm (125 in)
5	Sidnei Dos Santos Jr.	9 July 1982	203 cm (6 ft 8 in)	98 kg (216 lb)	344 cm (135 in)	318 cm (125 in)
6	Leandro Vissotto Neves	30 April 1983	212 cm (6 ft 11 in)	108 kg (238 lb)	370 cm (150 in)	345 cm (136 in)
7	Gilberto Godoy Filho	23 December 1976	192 cm (6 ft 4 in)	85 kg (187 lb)	325 cm (128 in)	312 cm (123 in)
8	Murilo Endres	3 May 1981	190 cm (6 ft 3 in)	76 kg (168 lb)	343 cm (135 in)	319 cm (126 in)
9	Theo Lopes	31 August 1983	199 cm (6 ft 6 in)	80 kg (180 lb)	345 cm (136 in)	324 cm (128 in)
10	Sérgio Dutra Santos	15 October 1975	184 cm (6 ft 0 in)	78 kg (172 lb)	325 cm (128 in)	310 cm (120 in)
13	Gustavo Endres	23 August 1975	203 cm (6 ft 8 in)	98 kg (216 lb)	337 cm (133 in)	325 cm (128 in)
14	Rodrigo Santana	17 April 1979	205 cm (6 ft 9 in)	85 kg (187 lb)	350 cm (140 in)	328 cm (129 in)
15	João Paulo Bravo Pereira	7 January 1979	190 cm (6 ft 3 in)	87 kg (192 lb)	340 cm (130 in)	320 cm (130 in)
16	Lucas Saatkamp	6 March 1986	209 cm (6 ft 10 in)	101 kg (223 lb)	340 cm (130 in)	321 cm (126 in)
17	Marlon Muraguti Yared	27 July 1977	188 cm (6 ft 2 in)	82 kg (181 lb)	310 cm (120 in)	289 cm (114 in)
18	Dante Amaral	30 September 1980	201 cm (6 ft 7 in)	86 kg (190 lb)	345 cm (136 in)	327 cm (129 in)

== China ==
The following is the roster in the 2011 FIVB Volleyball World League.

No.	Name	Date of birth	Height	Weight	Spike	Block
1	Hongmin Bian	22 September 1989	210 cm (6 ft 11 in)	95 kg (209 lb)	355 cm (140 in)	330 cm (130 in)
2	Guojun Zhan	16 December 1988	197 cm (6 ft 6 in)	91 kg (201 lb)	235 cm (93 in)	230 cm (91 in)
3	Zhi Yuan	29 September 1981	194 cm (6 ft 4 in)	95 kg (209 lb)	348 cm (137 in)	334 cm (131 in)
4	Chen Zhang	28 June 1985	200 cm (6 ft 7 in)	89 kg (196 lb)	356 cm (140 in)	340 cm (130 in)
6	Chunlong Liang	25 March 1988	206 cm (6 ft 9 in)	91 kg (201 lb)	351 cm (138 in)	333 cm (131 in)
7	Weijun Zhong	20 April 1989	200 cm (6 ft 7 in)	88 kg (194 lb)	347 cm (137 in)	335 cm (132 in)
8	Jianjun Cui	1 August 1985	192 cm (6 ft 4 in)	94 kg (207 lb)	350 cm (140 in)	335 cm (132 in)
10	Ping Chen	1 September 1989	195 cm (6 ft 5 in)	78 kg (172 lb)	352 cm (139 in)	335 cm (132 in)
11	Xin Geng	15 November 1989	200 cm (6 ft 7 in)	80 kg (180 lb)	350 cm (140 in)	340 cm (130 in)
14	Jingtao Xu	7 July 1988	202 cm (6 ft 8 in)	76 kg (168 lb)	356 cm (140 in)	320 cm (130 in)
15	Runming Li	1 March 1990	198 cm (6 ft 6 in)	93 kg (205 lb)	350 cm (140 in)	326 cm (128 in)
16	Qi Ren	24 February 1984	174 cm (5 ft 9 in)	70 kg (150 lb)	322 cm (127 in)	312 cm (123 in)
17	Fanwei Kong	4 December 1989	176 cm (5 ft 9 in)	80 kg (180 lb)	320 cm (130 in)	305 cm (120 in)
18	Jianwei Song	4 January 1992	194 cm (6 ft 4 in)	75 kg (165 lb)	350 cm (140 in)	340 cm (130 in)

== Cuba ==
The following is the roster in the 2011 FIVB Volleyball World League.

No.	Name	Date of birth	Height	Weight	Spike	Block
1	Wilfredo Leon Venero	31 July 1993	202 cm (6 ft 8 in)	96 kg (212 lb)	350 cm (140 in)	346 cm (136 in)
2	Lian Sem Estrada Jova	12 December 1982	196 cm (6 ft 5 in)	83 kg (183 lb)	339 cm (133 in)	335 cm (132 in)
4	Yassel Perdomo Naranjo	23 March 1993	201 cm (6 ft 7 in)	96 kg (212 lb)	355 cm (140 in)	325 cm (128 in)
6	Keibel Gutierrez Torna	6 May 1987	178 cm (5 ft 10 in)	80 kg (180 lb)	305 cm (120 in)	295 cm (116 in)
7	Yordan Bisset Astengo	21 October 1994	194 cm (6 ft 4 in)	89 kg (196 lb)	336 cm (132 in)	314 cm (124 in)
8	Rolando Cepeda Abreu	13 March 1989	198 cm (6 ft 6 in)	77 kg (170 lb)	359 cm (141 in)	344 cm (135 in)
12	Yenry Bell Cisnero	27 July 1981	188 cm (6 ft 2 in)	84 kg (185 lb)	358 cm (141 in)	328 cm (129 in)
13	David Fiel Rodriguez	28 August 1993	204 cm (6 ft 8 in)	93 kg (205 lb)	374 cm (147 in)	369 cm (145 in)
14	Raydel Hierrezuelo Aguirre	14 July 1987	196 cm (6 ft 5 in)	87 kg (192 lb)	340 cm (130 in)	335 cm (132 in)
16	Isbel Mesa Sandobal	2 June 1989	204 cm (6 ft 8 in)	89 kg (196 lb)	358 cm (141 in)	331 cm (130 in)
18	Yosmany Díaz Carmenate	8 January 1988	196 cm (6 ft 5 in)	89 kg (196 lb)	358 cm (141 in)	328 cm (129 in)
19	Fernando Hernandez Ramos	11 September 1989	196 cm (6 ft 5 in)	78 kg (172 lb)	358 cm (141 in)	339 cm (133 in)

== Egypt ==
The following is the roster in the 2011 FIVB Volleyball World League.

No.	Name	Date of birth	Height	Weight	Spike	Block
2	Abdallah Bekhit	10 October 1983	198 cm (6 ft 6 in)	72 kg (159 lb)	352 cm (139 in)	331 cm (130 in)
4	Ahmed Abdelhay	19 August 1984	197 cm (6 ft 6 in)	87 kg (192 lb)	342 cm (135 in)	316 cm (124 in)
5	Abdellatif Ahmed	13 August 1983	202 cm (6 ft 8 in)	90 kg (200 lb)	345 cm (136 in)	325 cm (128 in)
6	Wael Alaydy	8 December 1971	178 cm (5 ft 10 in)	78 kg (172 lb)	320 cm (130 in)	300 cm (120 in)
7	Ashraf Abouelhassan	17 May 1975	186 cm (6 ft 1 in)	86 kg (190 lb)	325 cm (128 in)	318 cm (125 in)
9	Rashad Atia	2 September 1986	201 cm (6 ft 7 in)	91 kg (201 lb)	348 cm (137 in)	342 cm (135 in)
10	Reda Haikal	7 November 1990	198 cm (6 ft 6 in)	85 kg (187 lb)	359 cm (141 in)	342 cm (135 in)
11	Ahmed Afifi	30 March 1988	194 cm (6 ft 4 in)	92 kg (203 lb)	347 cm (137 in)	342 cm (135 in)
13	Mohamed Badawy	11 January 1986	197 cm (6 ft 6 in)	97 kg (214 lb)	351 cm (138 in)	343 cm (135 in)
15	Ahmed Abdel Fattah	14 June 1986	198 cm (6 ft 6 in)	95 kg (209 lb)	335 cm (132 in)	325 cm (128 in)
16	Mohamed Ketat	2 March 1984	205 cm (6 ft 9 in)	93 kg (205 lb)	350 cm (140 in)	316 cm (124 in)
17	Mahmoud Abd El Kader	12 May 1985	195 cm (6 ft 5 in)	94 kg (207 lb)	342 cm (135 in)	316 cm (124 in)
18	Mohamed Issa	12 April 1988	200 cm (6 ft 7 in)	80 kg (180 lb)	335 cm (132 in)	0 cm (0 in)
19	Mohamed Moawad	26 August 1987	194 cm (6 ft 4 in)	90 kg (200 lb)	321 cm (126 in)	310 cm (120 in)

== Iran ==
The following is the roster in the 2011 FIVB Volleyball World League.

No.	Name	Date of birth	Height	Weight	Spike	Block
3	Amir Hosseini	23 July 1975	183 cm (6 ft 0 in)	73 kg (161 lb)	339 cm (133 in)	320 cm (130 in)
4	Seyed Mohammad Mousavi Eraghi	22 August 1987	203 cm (6 ft 8 in)	86 kg (190 lb)	362 cm (143 in)	344 cm (135 in)
7	Hamzeh Zarini	18 October 1985	198 cm (6 ft 6 in)	98 kg (216 lb)	351 cm (138 in)	330 cm (130 in)
8	Farhad Zarif Ahangaran V.	3 March 1983	165 cm (5 ft 5 in)	60 kg (130 lb)	290 cm (110 in)	271 cm (107 in)
9	Alireza Nadi	2 September 1980	200 cm (6 ft 7 in)	90 kg (200 lb)	334 cm (131 in)	320 cm (130 in)
10	Amir Ghafour	6 June 1991	202 cm (6 ft 8 in)	90 kg (200 lb)	354 cm (139 in)	334 cm (131 in)
12	Farhad Nazari Afshar	22 May 1984	195 cm (6 ft 5 in)	85 kg (187 lb)	345 cm (136 in)	331 cm (130 in)
13	Mehdi Mahdavi	13 February 1984	191 cm (6 ft 3 in)	96 kg (212 lb)	330 cm (130 in)	310 cm (120 in)
14	Arash Keshavarzi	16 February 1987	198 cm (6 ft 6 in)	94 kg (207 lb)	344 cm (135 in)	325 cm (128 in)
15	Hesam Bakhsheshi	21 March 1984	200 cm (6 ft 7 in)	91 kg (201 lb)	341 cm (134 in)	323 cm (127 in)
16	Seyed Mehdi Bazargarde Shalkohimojarad	16 March 1979	200 cm (6 ft 7 in)	93 kg (205 lb)	360 cm (140 in)	350 cm (140 in)
19	Arash Kamalvand	11 May 1989	201 cm (6 ft 7 in)	91 kg (201 lb)	345 cm (136 in)	325 cm (128 in)

== Italy ==
The following is the roster in the 2011 FIVB Volleyball World League.

No.	Name	Date of birth	Height	Weight	Spike	Block
1	Luigi Mastrangelo	17 August 1975	202 cm (6 ft 8 in)	90 kg (200 lb)	368 cm (145 in)	336 cm (132 in)
3	Simone Parodi	16 June 1986	196 cm (6 ft 5 in)	82 kg (181 lb)	350 cm (140 in)	335 cm (132 in)
4	Andrea Bari	5 March 1980	185 cm (6 ft 1 in)	81 kg (179 lb)	327 cm (129 in)	310 cm (120 in)
7	Michal Lasko	11 March 1981	202 cm (6 ft 8 in)	104 kg (229 lb)	348 cm (137 in)	337 cm (133 in)
9	Ivan Zaytsev	2 October 1988	202 cm (6 ft 8 in)	92 kg (203 lb)	355 cm (140 in)	348 cm (137 in)
10	Dante Boninfante	7 March 1977	194 cm (6 ft 4 in)	75 kg (165 lb)	334 cm (131 in)	315 cm (124 in)
11	Cristian Savani	22 February 1982	195 cm (6 ft 5 in)	95 kg (209 lb)	354 cm (139 in)	335 cm (132 in)
12	Simone Buti	19 September 1983	206 cm (6 ft 9 in)	100 kg (220 lb)	346 cm (136 in)	328 cm (129 in)
13	Dragan Travica	28 August 1986	200 cm (6 ft 7 in)	94 kg (207 lb)	335 cm (132 in)	320 cm (130 in)
14	Alessandro Fei	29 November 1978	204 cm (6 ft 8 in)	90 kg (200 lb)	358 cm (141 in)	336 cm (132 in)
15	Emanuele Birarelli	8 February 1981	202 cm (6 ft 8 in)	95 kg (209 lb)	340 cm (130 in)	316 cm (124 in)
17	Andrea Giovi	19 August 1983	183 cm (6 ft 0 in)	80 kg (180 lb)	310 cm (120 in)	290 cm (110 in)
18	Giulio Sabbi	10 August 1989	201 cm (6 ft 7 in)	92 kg (203 lb)	352 cm (139 in)	325 cm (128 in)
20	Mattia Rosso	28 May 1985	198 cm (6 ft 6 in)	98 kg (216 lb)	347 cm (137 in)	315 cm (124 in)

== Japan ==
The following is the roster in the 2011 FIVB Volleyball World League.

No.	Name	Date of birth	Height	Weight	Spike	Block
2	Yuta Abe	8 August 1981	191 cm (6 ft 3 in)	85 kg (187 lb)	342 cm (135 in)	320 cm (130 in)
3	Takeshi Nagano	11 July 1985	176 cm (5 ft 9 in)	69 kg (152 lb)	315 cm (124 in)	300 cm (120 in)
5	Daisuke Usami	29 March 1979	184 cm (6 ft 0 in)	88 kg (194 lb)	320 cm (130 in)	310 cm (120 in)
6	Yoshifumi Suzuki	31 March 1983	200 cm (6 ft 7 in)	95 kg (209 lb)	340 cm (130 in)	300 cm (120 in)
7	Takahiro Yamamoto	12 July 1978	201 cm (6 ft 7 in)	98 kg (216 lb)	345 cm (136 in)	335 cm (132 in)
8	Kazuyoshi Yokota	1 May 1986	194 cm (6 ft 4 in)	85 kg (187 lb)	345 cm (136 in)	325 cm (128 in)
10	Osamu Tanabe	10 April 1979	181 cm (5 ft 11 in)	73 kg (161 lb)	330 cm (130 in)	300 cm (120 in)
11	Yoshihiko Matsumoto	7 January 1981	193 cm (6 ft 4 in)	80 kg (180 lb)	340 cm (130 in)	330 cm (130 in)
12	Kota Yamamura	20 October 1980	205 cm (6 ft 9 in)	95 kg (209 lb)	350 cm (140 in)	335 cm (132 in)
13	Kunihiro Shimizu	11 August 1986	192 cm (6 ft 4 in)	97 kg (214 lb)	345 cm (136 in)	335 cm (132 in)
14	Tatsuya Fukuzawa	1 July 1986	189 cm (6 ft 2 in)	86 kg (190 lb)	355 cm (140 in)	345 cm (136 in)
15	Daisuke Yako	7 October 1988	194 cm (6 ft 4 in)	89 kg (196 lb)	335 cm (132 in)	325 cm (128 in)
16	Yusuke Ishijima	9 January 1984	197 cm (6 ft 6 in)	102 kg (225 lb)	345 cm (136 in)	335 cm (132 in)
18	Yuta Yoneyama	29 August 1984	185 cm (6 ft 1 in)	85 kg (187 lb)	340 cm (130 in)	320 cm (130 in)

== Poland ==
The following is the roster in the 2011 FIVB Volleyball World League.

No.	Name	Date of birth	Height	Weight	Spike	Block
1	Piotr Nowakowski	18 December 1987	205 cm (6 ft 9 in)	90 kg (200 lb)	355 cm (140 in)	340 cm (130 in)
2	Michal Winiarski	28 September 1983	200 cm (6 ft 7 in)	82 kg (181 lb)	345 cm (136 in)	332 cm (131 in)
5	Pawel Zagumny	18 October 1977	200 cm (6 ft 7 in)	88 kg (194 lb)	336 cm (132 in)	317 cm (125 in)
6	Bartosz Kurek	29 August 1988	205 cm (6 ft 9 in)	87 kg (192 lb)	352 cm (139 in)	326 cm (128 in)
7	Jakub Jarosz	10 February 1987	195 cm (6 ft 5 in)	84 kg (185 lb)	353 cm (139 in)	328 cm (129 in)
9	Zbigniew Bartman	4 May 1987	198 cm (6 ft 6 in)	95 kg (209 lb)	352 cm (139 in)	320 cm (130 in)
13	Michal Kubiak	23 February 1988	191 cm (6 ft 3 in)	80 kg (180 lb)	328 cm (129 in)	312 cm (123 in)
14	Michal Ruciak	22 August 1983	189 cm (6 ft 2 in)	75 kg (165 lb)	336 cm (132 in)	305 cm (120 in)
15	Lukasz Zygadlo	2 August 1979	200 cm (6 ft 7 in)	89 kg (196 lb)	337 cm (133 in)	325 cm (128 in)
16	Krzysztof Ignaczak	15 May 1978	188 cm (6 ft 2 in)	86 kg (190 lb)	330 cm (130 in)	315 cm (124 in)
17	Pawel Zatorski	21 June 1990	184 cm (6 ft 0 in)	73 kg (161 lb)	328 cm (129 in)	304 cm (120 in)
18	Marcin Mozdzonek	9 February 1985	211 cm (6 ft 11 in)	93 kg (205 lb)	358 cm (141 in)	338 cm (133 in)
19	Patryk Czarnowski	1 November 1985	201 cm (6 ft 7 in)	85 kg (187 lb)	355 cm (140 in)	335 cm (132 in)
20	Lukasz Wisniewski	3 February 1989	198 cm (6 ft 6 in)	96 kg (212 lb)	345 cm (136 in)	323 cm (127 in)

== Russia ==
The following is the roster in the 2011 FIVB Volleyball World League.

No.	Name	Date of birth	Height	Weight	Spike	Block
2	Denis Biriukov	8 December 1988	202 cm (6 ft 8 in)	93 kg (205 lb)	352 cm (139 in)	324 cm (128 in)
3	Nikolay Apalikov	26 August 1982	203 cm (6 ft 8 in)	103 kg (227 lb)	353 cm (139 in)	344 cm (135 in)
4	Taras Khtey	22 May 1982	205 cm (6 ft 9 in)	109 kg (240 lb)	351 cm (138 in)	339 cm (133 in)
6	Evgeny Sivozhelez	6 August 1986	196 cm (6 ft 5 in)	90 kg (200 lb)	330 cm (130 in)	320 cm (130 in)
7	Sergey Makarov	28 March 1980	196 cm (6 ft 5 in)	97 kg (214 lb)	337 cm (133 in)	329 cm (130 in)
8	Sergey Tetyukhin	23 September 1975	197 cm (6 ft 6 in)	89 kg (196 lb)	345 cm (136 in)	338 cm (133 in)
9	Aleksandr Sokolov	1 March 1982	193 cm (6 ft 4 in)	97 kg (214 lb)	315 cm (124 in)	310 cm (120 in)
10	Roman Yakovlev	13 August 1976	202 cm (6 ft 8 in)	102 kg (225 lb)	344 cm (135 in)	332 cm (131 in)
12	Alexander Butko	18 March 1986	198 cm (6 ft 6 in)	97 kg (214 lb)	339 cm (133 in)	327 cm (129 in)
13	Dmitriy Muserskiy	29 October 1988	218 cm (7 ft 2 in)	104 kg (229 lb)	375 cm (148 in)	347 cm (137 in)
16	Pavel Kruglov	17 September 1985	205 cm (6 ft 9 in)	98 kg (216 lb)	351 cm (138 in)	342 cm (135 in)
17	Maxim Mikhaylov	19 March 1988	202 cm (6 ft 8 in)	103 kg (227 lb)	345 cm (136 in)	330 cm (130 in)
18	Alexander Volkov	14 February 1985	210 cm (6 ft 11 in)	90 kg (200 lb)	360 cm (140 in)	335 cm (132 in)
20	Alexey Obmochaev	22 May 1989	188 cm (6 ft 2 in)	80 kg (180 lb)	325 cm (128 in)	310 cm (120 in)

== Serbia ==
The following is the roster in the 2011 FIVB Volleyball World League.

No.	Name	Date of birth	Height	Weight	Spike	Block
1	Nikola Kovacevic	14 February 1983	193 cm (6 ft 4 in)	78 kg (172 lb)	350 cm (140 in)	340 cm (130 in)
2	Uros Kovacevic	6 May 1993	197 cm (6 ft 6 in)	90 kg (200 lb)	340 cm (130 in)	310 cm (120 in)
3	Milos Vemic	8 March 1987	202 cm (6 ft 8 in)	90 kg (200 lb)	338 cm (133 in)	320 cm (130 in)
5	Vlado Petkovic	6 January 1983	198 cm (6 ft 6 in)	97 kg (214 lb)	325 cm (128 in)	318 cm (125 in)
6	Milos Terzic	13 June 1987	202 cm (6 ft 8 in)	88 kg (194 lb)	340 cm (130 in)	320 cm (130 in)
7	Dragan Stankovic	18 October 1985	205 cm (6 ft 9 in)	94 kg (207 lb)	343 cm (135 in)	333 cm (131 in)
10	Milos Nikic	31 March 1986	194 cm (6 ft 4 in)	79 kg (174 lb)	350 cm (140 in)	330 cm (130 in)
11	Mihajlo Mitic	17 September 1990	201 cm (6 ft 7 in)	86 kg (190 lb)	335 cm (132 in)	320 cm (130 in)
12	Milan Rasic	2 February 1985	205 cm (6 ft 9 in)	86 kg (190 lb)	340 cm (130 in)	320 cm (130 in)
14	Ivan Miljkovic	13 September 1979	206 cm (6 ft 9 in)	104 kg (229 lb)	354 cm (139 in)	333 cm (131 in)
16	Aleksandar Atanasijevic	4 September 1991	200 cm (6 ft 7 in)	92 kg (203 lb)	350 cm (140 in)	329 cm (130 in)
17	Borislav Petrovic	6 January 1988	201 cm (6 ft 7 in)	96 kg (212 lb)	350 cm (140 in)	330 cm (130 in)
18	Marko Podrascanin	29 August 1987	203 cm (6 ft 8 in)	100 kg (220 lb)	343 cm (135 in)	326 cm (128 in)
19	Nikola Rosic	5 August 1984	192 cm (6 ft 4 in)	85 kg (187 lb)	328 cm (129 in)	315 cm (124 in)

== United States ==
The following is the roster in the 2011 FIVB Volleyball World League.

No.	Name	Date of birth	Height	Weight	Spike	Block
1	Matthew Anderson	18 April 1987	202 cm (6 ft 8 in)	100 kg (220 lb)	360 cm (140 in)	332 cm (131 in)
2	Sean Rooney	13 November 1982	206 cm (6 ft 9 in)	100 kg (220 lb)	354 cm (139 in)	336 cm (132 in)
3	Evan Patak	23 June 1984	201 cm (6 ft 7 in)	113 kg (249 lb)	363 cm (143 in)	330 cm (130 in)
4	David Lee	8 March 1982	203 cm (6 ft 8 in)	105 kg (231 lb)	350 cm (140 in)	325 cm (128 in)
5	Richard Lambourne	6 May 1975	190 cm (6 ft 3 in)	90 kg (200 lb)	324 cm (128 in)	312 cm (123 in)
6	Paul Lotman	3 November 1985	200 cm (6 ft 7 in)	102 kg (225 lb)	336 cm (132 in)	312 cm (123 in)
8	William Reid Priddy	1 October 1977	194 cm (6 ft 4 in)	89 kg (196 lb)	353 cm (139 in)	330 cm (130 in)
9	Ryan Millar	22 January 1978	204 cm (6 ft 8 in)	98 kg (216 lb)	354 cm (139 in)	326 cm (128 in)
10	Riley Salmon	2 July 1976	198 cm (6 ft 6 in)	89 kg (196 lb)	345 cm (136 in)	331 cm (130 in)
12	Russell Holmes	1 July 1982	205 cm (6 ft 9 in)	95 kg (209 lb)	352 cm (139 in)	335 cm (132 in)
13	Clayton Stanley	20 January 1978	205 cm (6 ft 9 in)	104 kg (229 lb)	357 cm (141 in)	332 cm (131 in)
14	Kevin Hansen	19 March 1982	196 cm (6 ft 5 in)	93 kg (205 lb)	349 cm (137 in)	330 cm (130 in)
15	Brian Thornton	22 April 1985	190 cm (6 ft 3 in)	88 kg (194 lb)	327 cm (129 in)	314 cm (124 in)
17	Maxwell Holt	12 March 1987	205 cm (6 ft 9 in)	90 kg (200 lb)	351 cm (138 in)	333 cm (131 in)
