= Egypt men's national volleyball team =

Men's national volleyball team representing Egypt

Egypt
- Nickname(s): The Pharaohs
- Association: Egyptian Volleyball Federation (FEVB)
- Confederation: CAVB
- Head coach: Marco Bonitta
- FIVB ranking: 29 (15 October 2026)

Uniforms
Home	Away	Third

Summer Olympics
- Appearances: 6 (First in 1976)
- Best result: 9th (2016)

World Championship
- Appearances: 11 (First in 1974)
- Best result: 13th (2010)

World Cup
- Appearances: 8 (First in 1977)
- Best result: 8th (1985)

African Championship
- Appearances: 21 (First in 1971)
- Best result: (gold) (1976, 1983, 2005, 2007, 2009, 2011, 2013, 2015, 2023)
- www.fevb.org

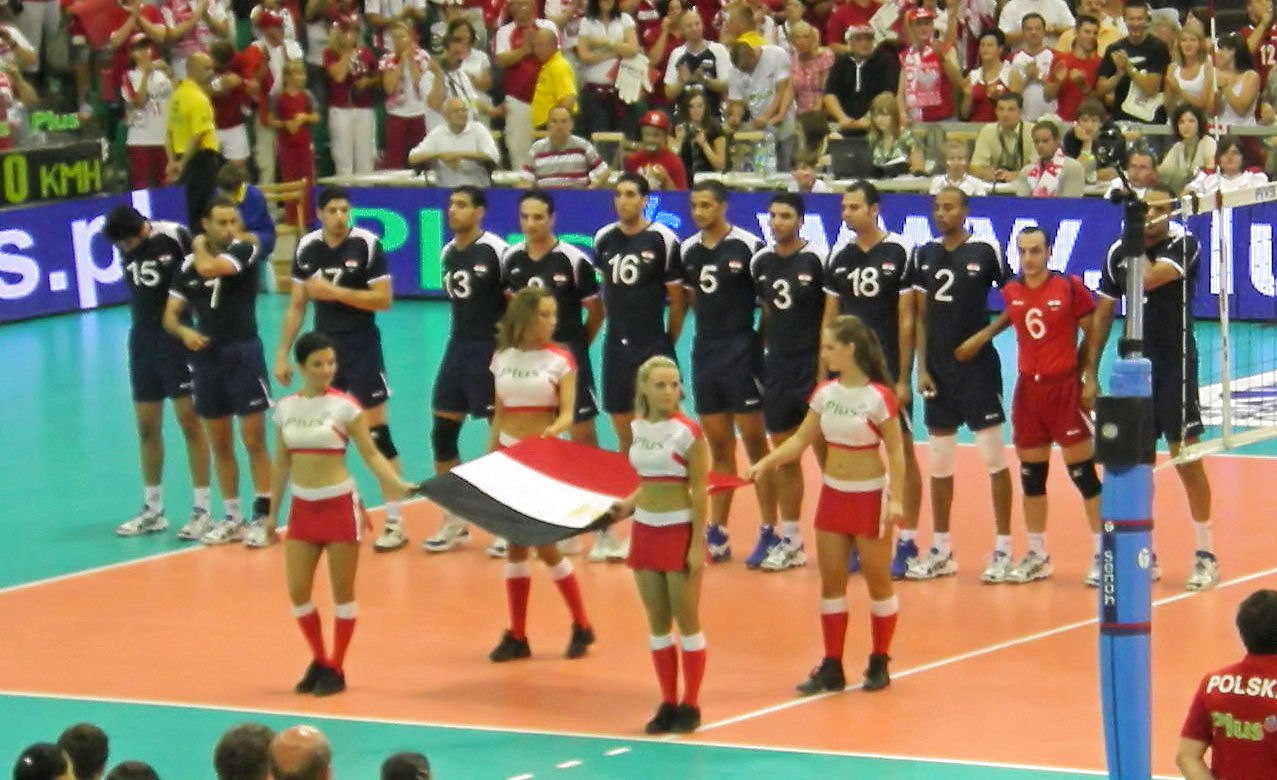
Egypt men's national volleyball team, Poznań 2008.

Egypt men's national volleyball team
Medal record

Challenger Cup
Bronze medal – third place	2024	Team

African Championship
Gold medal – first place	1976	
Gold medal – first place	1983	
Gold medal – first place	2005	
Gold medal – first place	2007	
Gold medal – first place	2009	
Gold medal – first place	2011	
Gold medal – first place	2013	
Gold medal – first place	2015	
Gold medal – first place	2023	
Silver medal – second place	1971	
Silver medal – second place	1991	
Silver medal – second place	1995	
Silver medal – second place	1999	
Silver medal – second place	2003	
Silver medal – second place	2017	
Bronze medal – third place	1989	
Bronze medal – third place	1993	
Bronze medal – third place	2021	

Mediterranean Games
Gold medal – first place	2005	

The Egypt men's national volleyball team represents Egypt in international volleyball competition. The team is governed by the Egyptian Volleyball Federation, which represents the country in international competitions and friendly matches.

== Competition record ==
=== Olympic Games ===
Year	Round	Position	M	W	L	SW	SL
(Japan) 1964	Did not qualify						
(Mexico) 1968	Did not qualify						
(West Germany) 1972	Did not qualify						
(Canada) 1976	Group Stages	WD*	0	0	0	0	0
(Soviet Union) 1980	Did not qualify						
(United States) 1984	Group Stages	10th	5	0	5	2	15
(South Korea) 1988	Did not qualify						
(Spain) 1992	Did not qualify						
(United States) 1996	Did not qualify						
(Australia) 2000	Group Stages	11th	5	0	5	1	15
(Greece) 2004	Did not qualify						
(China) 2008	Group Stages	11th	5	0	5	0	15
(United Kingdom) 2012	Did not qualify						
(Brazil) 2016	Group Stages	9th	5	1	4	3	12
(Japan) 2020	Did not qualify						
(France) 2024	Group Stages	12th	3	0	3	0	9
(United States) 2028	To be determined						
(Australia) 2032	To be determined						
Total		6/18	23	1	22	6	66

- Egypt withdrew because of the Congolese-led boycott after they lost to Brazil 1–3. The result of that match was annulled.

=== World Championship ===
Year	Round	Position	Pld	W	L
(Czechoslovakia) 1949	Did not enter				
(Soviet Union) 1952	Did not enter				
(France) 1956	Did not enter				
(Brazil) 1960	Did not enter				
(Soviet Union) 1962	Did not enter				
(Czechoslovakia) 1966	Did not enter				
(Bulgaria) 1970	Did not qualify				
(Mexico) 1974	Group Stages	17th	10	3	7
(Italy) 1978	Group Stages	23rd	9	2	7
(Argentina) 1982	Did not qualify				
(France) 1986	Group Stages	14th	6	1	5
(Brazil) 1990	Did not qualify				
(Greece) 1994	Did not qualify				
(Japan) 1998	Group Stages	19th	3	0	3
(Argentina) 2002	Group Stages	19th	3	0	3
(Japan) 2006	Group Stages	21st	5	1	4
(Italy) 2010	Second Round	13th	5	1	4
(Poland) 2014	Group Stages	21st	5	0	5
(Italy) (Bulgaria) 2018	Group Stages	20th	5	1	4
(Poland) (Slovenia) 2022	First Round	19th	3	0	3
(Philippines) 2025	Group Stages	25th	3	1	2
(Poland) 2027	to be determined				
(Qatar) 2029	to be determined				
Total		11/23	51	8	43

=== World Cup ===
Year	Round	Position	Pld	W	L
(Poland) 1965	Did not enter				
(East Germany) 1969	Disqualified				
(Japan) 1977	Group Stages	11th	5	1	4
(Japan) 1981	Disqualified				
(Japan) 1985	Round Robin	8th	7	0	7
(Japan) 1989	Disqualified				
(Japan) 1991	Disqualified				
(Japan) 1995	Round Robin	11th	11	1	10
(Japan) 1999	Disqualified				
(Japan) 2003	Round Robin	12th	11	1	10
(Japan) 2007	Round Robin	10th	11	3	8
(Japan) 2011	Round Robin	12th	11	1	10
(Japan) 2015	Round Robin	10th	11	2	9
(Japan) 2019	Round Robin	10th	11	2	9
Total		8/14	78	11	67

=== World Grand Champions Cup ===
Year	Round	Position	Pld	W	L
(Japan) 1993	Did not enter				
(Japan) 1997	Did not enter				
(Japan) 2001	Did not enter				
(Japan) 2005	Round Robin	5th	5	1	4
(Japan) 2009	Round Robin	6th	5	0	5
(Japan) 2013	Did not enter				
(Japan) 2017	Did not enter				
Total		2/7	10	1	9

=== World League ===
- 2006 – 13th
- 2007 – 13th
- 2008 – 13th
- 2010 – 14th
- 2015 – 21st
- 2016 – 20th
- 2017 – 24th

=== Challenger Cup ===
Challenger Cup record
Year	Round	Position	GP	W	L	SW	SL	Squad
(Portugal) 2018	Did not enter							
(Slovenia) 2019	Group stage	5th	2	0	2	4	6	Squad
(South Korea) 2022	Did not enter							
(Qatar) 2023	Did not enter							
(China) 2024	Semifinals	3rd	3	2	1	6	7	Squad
Total		2/5	5	2	3	10	13	—

=== Universiade ===
- 2009 – (bronze)

=== All-Africa Games ===
- 1965 – (gold)
- 1973 – (gold)
- 1991 – (silver)
- 1995 – (gold)
- 1999 – (bronze)
- 2003 – (gold)
- 2007 – (gold)
- 2015 – (bronze)
- 2019 – (bronze)
- 2023 – (gold)

=== Mediterranean Games ===
- 1971 – 5th
- 1975 – 6th
- 1979 – 5th
- 1983 – 5th
- 2005 – (gold)
- 2022 – 8th

=== European Championship ===
- 1955 – 14th
- 1958 – 15th

=== Arab Volleyball Challenge Cup ===
- (Jordan) 2025 – (silver)

== Friendly tournament ==
=== Memorial of Hubert Jerzy Wagner ===
- 2006 Memorial of Hubert Jerzy Wagner - 7th
- 2021 Memorial of Hubert Jerzy Wagner - (silver)
- 2024 Memorial of Hubert Jerzy Wagner - 4th

== Team ==
=== Current squad ===
Roster for the 2024 Summer Olympics.

The roster was announced on 9 July 2024.

Head coach: (Spain) Fernando Muñoz

- 2 Ahmed Azab Abdelrahman OH
- 5 Mohamed Osman Elhaddad MB
- 6 Mohamed Hassan L
- 8 Abdelrahman Elhossiny Eissa OH
- 9 Mohamed Sayedin Asran OH
- 10 Mohamed Masoud MB
- 12 Hossam Abdalla (c) S
- 14 Seifeldin Hassan Aly OP
- 15 Abdelrahman Seoudy MB
- 16 Mostafa Gaber Abdelsalam Abdelmoaty S
- 17 Reda Haikal OP
- 22 Mohamed Moustafa Issa OH

=== Former squads ===
- 2003 FIVB World Cup — 12th place
  Hamdy Awad El-Safi (c), Youssef Saleh, Mohamed Shehata, Ossama Kemsan, Wael El-Aydy, Ashraf El-Hassan, Mohamed Awad Eslam, Mohamed El-Mahdy, Mohamed Moselhy, Weal Said, Abdelnaeim Salah El-Dein, and Mahmoud Hassona. Head Coach: Veselin Vuković.
- 2005 Mediterranean Games — 1st place
  Mahmoud Abdullah El-Kader, Ahmed Abdalla El-Naeim, Abdullah Alla Ahmed, Wael Al-Aydy, Hamdy Awad, Mohamed Badawy, Ossama Bekheit, Mahmoud El-Komy, Mohamed El-Mahdy, Mohamed El-Nafrawy, Mohamed El-Nasr, and Ayman Shwkry. Head Coach: Veselin Vuković.
- 2005 World Grand Champions Cup — 5th place
  Hamdy Awad El-Safi (c), Ahmed Abdalla El-Salam, Ahmed El-Naeim, Ossama Bekheit, Wael El-Aydy, Youssef Saleh, Mohamed El-Mahdy, Mahmoud El-Komy, Mohamed El-Nafrawy, Mohamed Badawy, Mohamed El-Daabousi and Hossam Shaarawy. Head Coach: Ahmed Zakaria.
- 2006 FIVB World League — 13th place
  Hamdy Awad El-Safi (c), Ahmed Abdalla El-Salam, Mohamed Gabl, Ahmed El-Naeim, Ossama Bekheit, Wael El-Aydy, Ashraf Abouel Hassan, Youssef Saleh, Mohamed El-Mahdy, Mahmoud El-Komy, Mohamed El Sayed, Hamdy Rashad, Mohamed Badawy, Hossam Mostafa, Elian Aly Hussein, Mohamed Seif Al-Masr, Mahmoud Abdelkader, and Ahmed Awadalla. Head Coach: Grzegorz Rys.
- 2008 Summer Olympics — 11th place

Hamdy Awad, Abdalla Ahmed, abdallah abdelsalam, Mohamed Gabal, Ahmed Abdel Naeim, Abdel Latif Ahmed, Wael Al Aydy, Ashraf Abouelhassan, Saleh Youssef, Mohamed Badawy, Hossameldin Gomaa, Mohamed Seif Elnasr, and Mahmoud Abd El kader. Head Coach: Ahmed Zakaria.

== See also ==
- Egypt men's national under-21 volleyball team
- Egypt men's national under-19 volleyball team
- Egypt men's national under-17 volleyball team
