= Gabal =

Gabal is a surname. Notable people with the surname include:

- Mohamed Abou Gabal (born 1989), Egyptian footballer
- Mohamed Gabal (born 1984), Egyptian volleyball player
