= Hamdy El-Safy =

Egyptian volleyball player (born 1972)

Hamdy El Safy

Personal information
- Full name: Hamdy El Safy AbdulHakam Awad
- Nationality: Egyptian
- Born: 14 April 1972 (age 54)
- Hometown: Alexandria
- Height: 202 cm (6 ft 8 in)
- Weight: 105 kg (231 lb)
- Spike: 346 cm (136 in)
- Block: 327 cm (129 in)

Coaching information
Previous teams coached
Years	Teams
2014–now	Al Ahly Women's Volleyball

Volleyball information
- Position: wing hitter
- Current club: Al Ahly (volleyball)

Career
Years	Teams
1989-2010; 2011	Al Ahly (volleyball); Jasko

National team
1992-2009	Egypt
Honours
Men's volleyball
Representing Egypt
African Championship
Gold medal – first place	2005 Egypt
Gold medal – first place	2007 South Africa
Gold medal – first place	2009 Morocco
Silver medal – second place	1995 Tunisia
Silver medal – second place	1999 Egypt
Silver medal – second place	2003 Egypt
Mediterranean Games
Gold medal – first place	2005 Almería

Hamdy Awad El-Safi (Arabic: حمدي الصافي عبدالحكم عوض) (born 14 April 1972) is a former Egyptian male volleyball player. He was included in the Egypt men's national volleyball team that finished 11th at the 2000 Summer Olympics in Sydney, Australia.

== Clubs ==
- Al Ahly SC (Egypt) :

- 14 × Egyptian Volleyball League : 1989–90, 1993–94, 1994–95, 1995–96, 1998–99, 1999–2000, 2001/02, 2002/03, 2003/04, 2005/06, 2006/07, 2008/09, 2009/10, 2010/11.

- 12 × Egyptian Volleyball Cup : 1989/90, 1995/96, 1998/99, 2001/02, 2002/03, 2003/04, 2004/05, 2005/06, 2006/07, 2007/08, 2009/10, 2010/11.

- 7 × African Clubs Championship (volleyball) : 1995 - 1996 - 1997 - 2003 - 2004 - 2006 - 2010.

- 6 × African Club Championship Cup Winners : 1991 - 1992 - 1995 - 1996 - 1997 - 2000 1 : 2001

- 5 × Arab Clubs Championship (volleyball) : 2001 - 2002 - 2005 - 2006 - 2010.

- El Mokawloon SC (Egypt)

1 × African Club Championship Cup Winners : 1993 (loan)

- Al-Hilal (Saudi Arabia) :

1 × AVC Club Volleyball Championship : 1998 (loan)

- CS Sfaxien VB (Tunisia)

1 × Arab Clubs Championship (volleyball) : 2008 (loan)

== National team ==
- 3 × Men's African Volleyball Championship : 2005 - 2007 - 2009
- 3 × Men's African Volleyball Championship : 1995 - 1999 - 2003
- 1 × Volleyball at the 2005 Mediterranean Games : 2005
- 2 × African Games : 2003 - 2007
- 5th place at 2005 FIVB Volleyball Men's World Grand Champions Cup
- 1 × Arab Games : 2006

== See also ==
- Egypt at the 2000 Summer Olympics
