= Marko Samardžić =

Serbian volleyball player

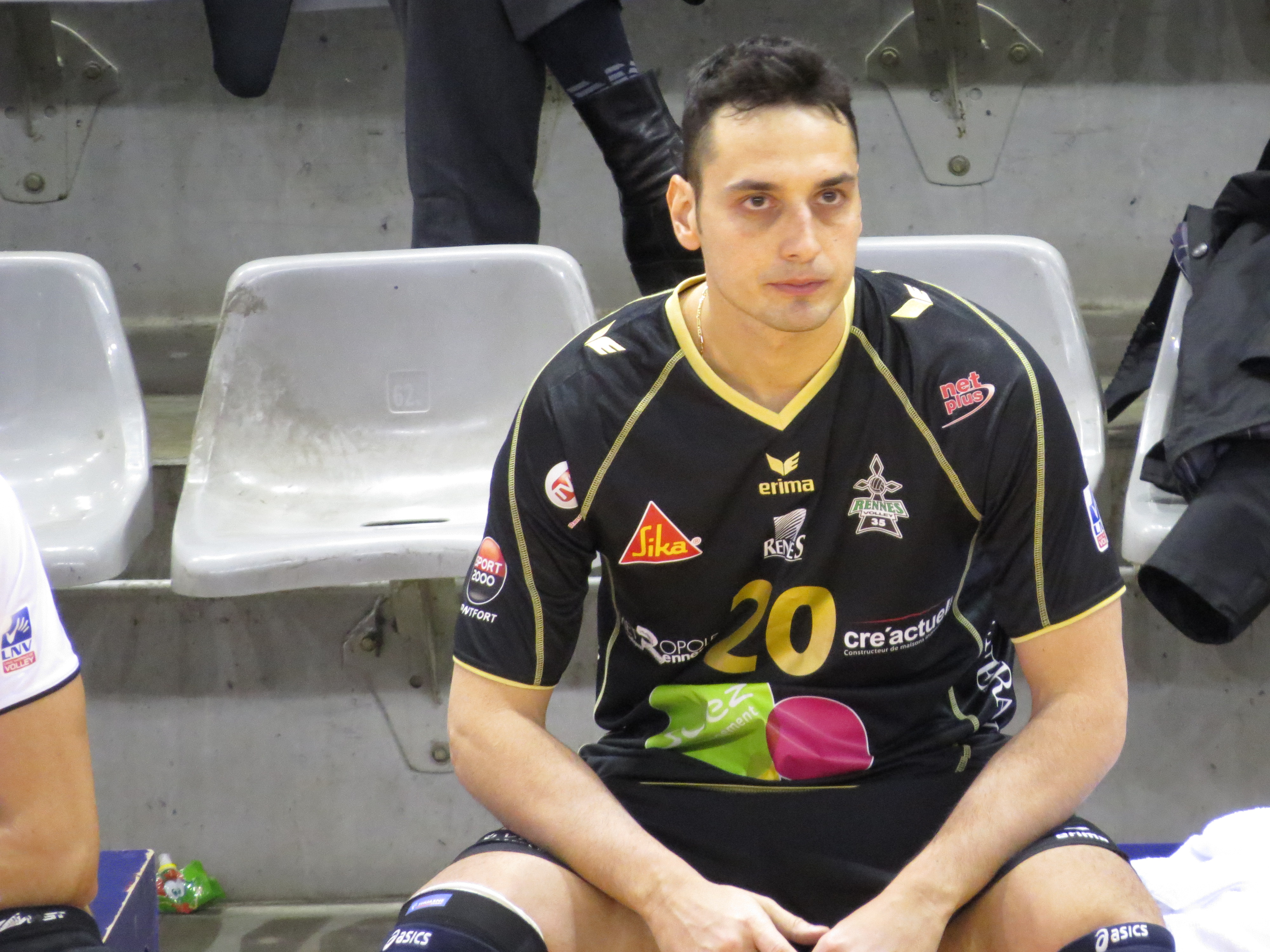
- Samardžić in 2014

Personal information
- Born: 22 February 1983 (age 43); Belgrade, SR Serbia, SFR Yugoslavia
- Height: 1.90 m (6 ft 3 in)
- Weight: 82 kg (181 lb)
- Spike: 326 cm (128 in)
- Block: 310 cm (120 in)

Volleyball information
- Position: Libero
- Current club: retired

National team
Serbia
Honours
Men's volleyball
Representing Serbia
World Championship
Bronze medal – third place	2010 Italy
European Championship
Bronze medal – third place	2005 Serbia / Italy
Bronze medal – third place	2007 Russia
World League
Silver medal – second place	2005 Belgrade
Silver medal – second place	2008 Rio de Janeiro
Silver medal – second place	2009 Belgrade

Marko Samardžić (Serbian: Марко Самарџић born 22 February 1983, in Belgrade, SR Serbia, Yugoslavia) is a former Serbian volleyball player (libero). He was a member of the national team at the 2008 Summer Olympics in Beijing.

== Career ==
- 2000–05 (Federal Republic of Yugoslavia) OK Crvena Zvezda
- 2005–07 (Serbia and Montenegro) OK Vojvodina
- 2007–08 (France) Tours VB
- 2008–09 (Poland) Trefl Gdańsk
- 2009–12 (Greece) Aris
