= 2007 Men's African Volleyball Championship =

The 2007 Men's African Volleyball Championship was held in Durban, South Africa, with 9 teams participating in the continental championship. The African Men's Volleyball Championship is the official competition for senior men's national volleyball teams of Africa, organized by the African Volleyball Confederation (CAVB).

Egypt defeated Tunisia 3-2 in the final to win the championship.

== Teams ==
- Cameroon
- South Africa
- Rwanda
- Mozambique
- Egypt
- Tunisia
- Kenya
- Botswana
- Zimbabwe

== Preliminary round ==
=== Group A ===
	Team	Points	G	W	L	PW	PL	Ratio	SW	SL	Ratio
1.	Cameroon	6	3	3	0	263	209	1.258	9	2	4.500
2.	South Africa	5	3	2	1	244	226	1.080	6	5	1.200
3.	Rwanda	4	3	1	2	284	279	1.018	7	6	1.167
4.	Mozambique	3	3	0	3	148	225	0.658	0	9	0.000

	Date	Teams	Set	1	2	3	4	5	Total points	Time	Audience
1.	16-Sep	MOZ-RSA	0-3	16-25	17-25	14-25			47-75		
2.	17-Sep	RWA-CMR	2-3	16-25	30-28	23-25	25-20	11-15	105-113		
3	18-Sep	CMR-MOZ	3-0	25-22	25-12	25-11			75-45		
4	18-Sep	RWA-RSA	2-3	19-25	25-22	22-25	25-23	13-15	104-110		
5	19-Sep	MOZ-RWA	0-3	19-25	22-25	15-25			56-75		
6	19-Sep	RSA-CMR	0-3	18-25	22-25	19-25			59-75		

=== Group B ===
	Team	Points	G	W	L	PW	PL	Ratio	SW	SL	Ratio
1.	Tunisia	8	4	4	0	304	229	1.328	12	0	MAX
2.	Egypt	7	4	3	1	297	230	1.291	9	3	3.000
3.	Kenya	6	4	2	2	306	316	0.968	6	8	0.750
4.	Botswana	5	4	1	3	292	323	0.904	4	10	0.400
5.	Zimbabwe	5	4	0	4	252	353	0.714	2	12	0.167

	Date	Teams	Set	1	2	3	4	5	Total points	Time	Audience
1.	16-Sep	BOT-KEN	1-3	21-25	20-25	25-16	19-25		85-91		
2.	16-Sep	ZIM-EGY	0-3	17-25	13-25	11-25			41-75		
3.	17-Sep	ZIM-TUN	0-3	17-25	20-25	12-25			49-75		
4.	17-Sep	KEN-EGY	0-3	24-26	12-25	19-25			55-76		
5.	18-Sep	TUN-KEN	3-0	25-20	25-23	25-19			75-62		
6.	18-Sep	EGY-BOT	3-0	25-23	25-10	25-22			75-55		
7.	19-Sep	ZIM-KEN	1-3	19-25	17-25	25-23	19-25		80-98		
8.	19-Sep	TUN-BOT	3-0	25-22	25-14	25-11			75-47		
9.	20-Sep	ZIM-BOT	1-3	14-25	32-30	13-25	23-25		82-105		
10.	20-Sep	TUN-EGY	3-0	25-21	29-27	25-23			79-71		

== Final round ==
Semi-finals
2007-09-22 – UKZN Westville Campus Sports Centre
Cameroon	0
Egypt	3
2007-09-22 – UKZN Westville Campus Sports Centre
Tunisia	3
South Africa	0

Final
2007-09-23 – UKZN Westville Campus Sports Centre
Egypt	3
Tunisia	2
3rd place
2007-09-23 – UKZN Westville Campus Sports Centre
Cameroon	3
South Africa	0

== Final ranking ==
1. Egypt

2. Tunisia

3. Cameroon

4. South Africa

2007 Men's African champions

Egypt
Fourth title
