= Miloš Nikić =

Serbian volleyball player

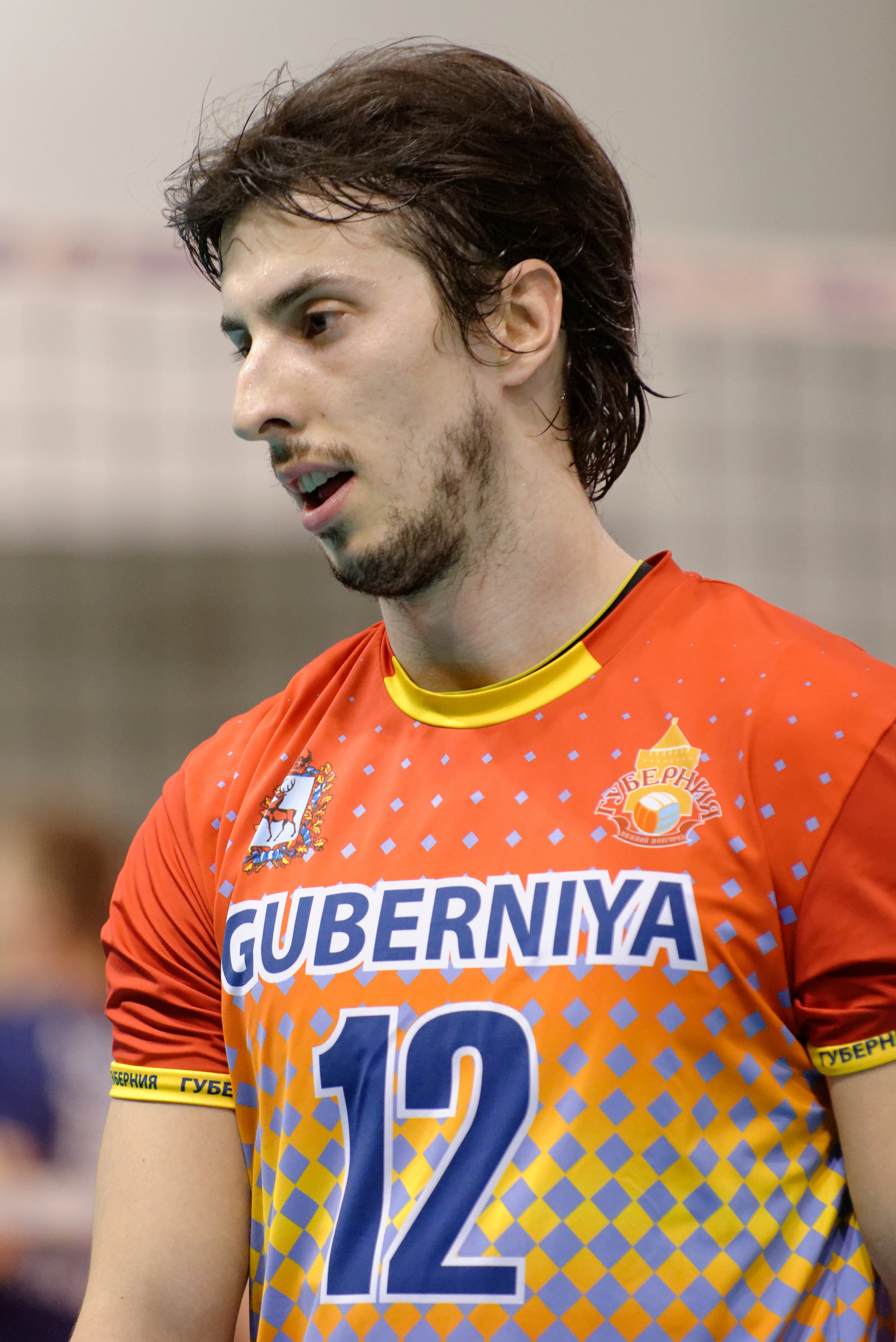
- Nikić with Guberniya Nizhny Novgorod during CEV Cup final in March 2014.

Personal information
- Full name: Miloš Nikić
- Born: 31 March 1986 (age 40); Cetinje, SR Montenegro, SFR Yugoslavia
- Height: 1.94 m (6 ft 4 in)
- Weight: 79 kg (174 lb)
- Spike: 350 cm (140 in)
- Block: 330 cm (130 in)

Volleyball information
- Position: Receiver
- Current club: (Italy) DHL Modena Volley
- Number: 10 (national team)

National team
Serbia
Honours
Men's volleyball
Representing Serbia
World Championship
Bronze medal – third place	2010 Italy
European Championship
Gold medal – first place	2011 Austria / Czech Republic
Bronze medal – third place	2007 Russia
Bronze medal – third place	2013 Denmark / Poland
World League
Gold medal – first place	2016 Kraków
Silver medal – second place	2008 Rio de Janeiro
Silver medal – second place	2009 Belgrade
Bronze medal – third place	2010 Cordoba
- Last updated: 17 July 2016

Miloš Nikić (Serbian Cyrillic: Милош Никић, born 31 March 1986) is a Serbian volleyball player (Wing-spiker). He was part of the Serbia and Montenegro men's national volleyball team at the 2006 FIVB Volleyball Men's World Championship in Japan. He was a member of the Serbian national team at the 2008 Summer Olympics in Beijing and 2012 Summer Olympics in London. He plays for Italian club DHL Modena Volley.

== Career ==
=== Clubs ===
Club	Country	From	To
Budvanska Rivijera Budva	Montenegro	2006	2007
Sparkling Milan	Italy	2007	2008
Knack Randstad Roeselare	Belgium	2008	2009
Andreoli Latina	Italy	2009	2010
RPA LuigiBacchi.it San Giustino	Italy	2010	2011
Acqua Paradiso Monza Brianza	Italy	2011	2012
Guberniya Nizhny Novgorod	Russia	2012	2014
Fenerbahçe Grundig	Turkey	2014	2015
DHL Modena Volley	Italy	2015	2016

== Sporting achievements ==
=== Clubs ===
==== National championships ====
- 2015–16 Italian Cup, with DHL Modena Volley

=== National team ===
- 2016 FIVB World League
