= Abdel Latif Ahmed =

Egyptian volleyball player (born 1983)

Abdel Latif Ahmed (Arabic: عبدالطيف أحمد) (born August 13, 1983) is an Egyptian indoor volleyball player. He was part of the Egypt national team at the 2008 Summer Olympics. He is a middle blocker and is 202 cm tall.

== Clubs ==
- Current – (Egypt) El Nasr
- Debut – (Egypt) AHLY
