= Saleh Youssef =

Egyptian volleyball player (born 1982)

Personal information
- Full name: Saleh Youssef Fathy
- Nationality: Egyptian
- Born: 25 July 1982 (age 44)
- Height: 194 cm (6 ft 4 in)
- Weight: 91 kg (201 lb)
- Spike: 345 cm (136 in)
- Block: 332 cm (131 in)

Volleyball information
- Number: 8 (national team)

Career
- Years: Team
- 2007: Zamalek

National team
- Years: Team
- 2007-2008: Egypt

Saleh Youssef Fathy (born 25 July 1982) is a former Egyptian male volleyball player. He was part of the Egypt men's national volleyball team at the 2008 Summer Olympics. On club level he played for Zamalek. He is an outside hitter and is 194 cm tall.

== Clubs ==
- Current – (Tunisia) Esperance
- Debut – (Egypt) Zamalek
