= Bojan Janić =

Serbian volleyball player

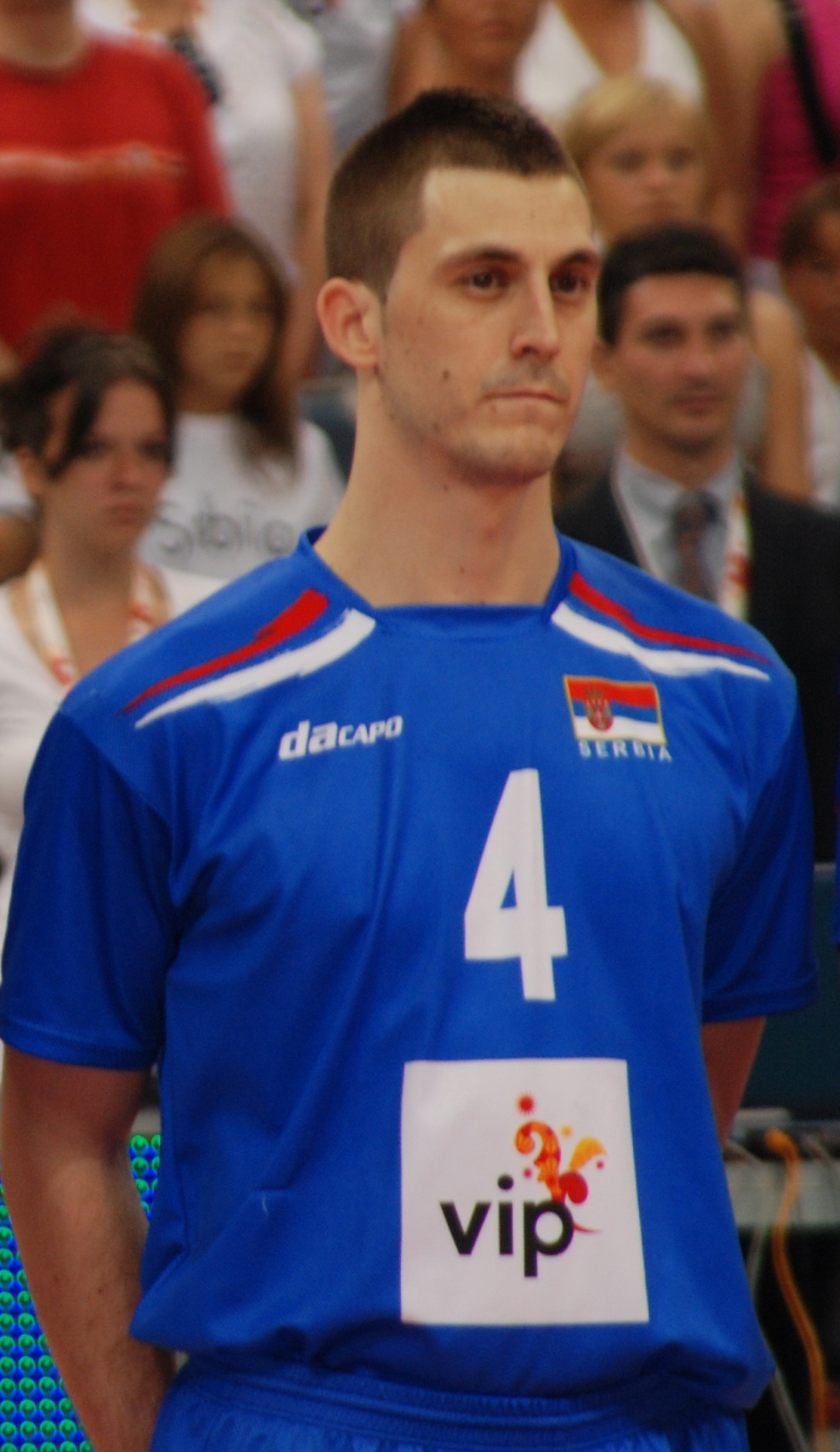
- Janić with Serbia during World League in July 2009.

Personal information
- Born: 11 March 1982 (age 44); Leskovac, SR Serbia, SFR Yugoslavia
- Height: 1.98 m (6 ft 6 in)
- Weight: 87 kg (192 lb)
- Spike: 345 cm (136 in)
- Block: 322 cm (127 in)

Volleyball information
- Current club: (Romania) C.V.M. Tomis Constanța
- Number: 4

National team
2003–2006; 2006–2012	Serbia and Montenegro; Serbia
Honours
Men's volleyball
World Championship
Bronze medal – third place	2010 Italy
European Championship
Bronze medal – third place	2005 Serbia/Italy
Bronze medal – third place	2007 Russia
World Cup
Bronze medal – third place	2003 Japan
World League
Silver medal – second place	2003 Madrid
Silver medal – second place	2005 Belgrade
Silver medal – second place	2008 Rio de Janeiro
Silver medal – second place	2009 Belgrade
Bronze medal – third place	2002 Belo Horizonte
Bronze medal – third place	2004 Rome
Bronze medal – third place	2010 Crodoba
Mediterranean Games
Bronze medal – third place	2005 Almería

Bojan Janić (Serbian Cyrillic: Бојан Јанић born 11 March 1982 in Leskovac, SR Serbia, Yugoslavia) is a Serbian volleyball player and former captain of the Serbia national team. He was a member of the national team at the 2008 Summer Olympics in Beijing and 2012 Summer Olympics in London.

== Career ==
- 1996-02 (Serbia and Montenegro) OK Crvena Zvezda
- 2002-03 (Serbia and Montenegro) OK Vojvodina
- 2003-04 (Italy) Estense 4 Torri Ferrara
- 2004-05 (Italy) Tonno Calipo Vibo Valentina
- 2005-06 (Spain) Unicaja Almeria
- 2006-07 (Italy) Codyeco S.Croce
- 2007-08 (Italy) Blu Volley Verona
- 2008-09 (Poland) Trefl Gdańsk
- 2009-11 (Russia) Yaroslavich Yaroslavl
- 2011-12 (Russia) Fakel, Novy Urengoy
- 2012-13 (Turkey) Galatasaray
- 2013-14 (China) Tang Dynasty Hotel Shanghai
- 2014- (Romania) C.V.M. Tomis Constanța

== Personal ==
Besides his native Serbian, Bojan is fluent in English, Russian and Italian. He married Serbian actress Nada Macanković.

Sporting positions
Preceded by Ivan Miljković	Serbia captain 2012	Succeeded by Dragan Stanković
