= Aleksandr Korneev =

Russian volleyball player (born 1980)

Personal information
- Full name: Aleksandr Vladimirovich Korneev
- Born: 11 September 1980 (age 45) Moscow, Russia
- Height: 200 cm (6 ft 7 in)
Medal record
Men's volleyball
Representing Russia
Olympic Games
Bronze medal – third place	2008 Beijing	Team competition

Aleksandr Vladimirovich Korneev (Russian: Александр Владимирович Корнеев, born 11 September 1980) is a retired volleyball player from Russia.

He was born in Moscow. His daughter Alina is a professional tennis player and two-time junior Grand Slam champion.

He competed at the 2008 Summer Olympics, where Russia claimed the bronze medal.
