= Mohamed Badawy =

Egyptian volleyball player (born 1986)

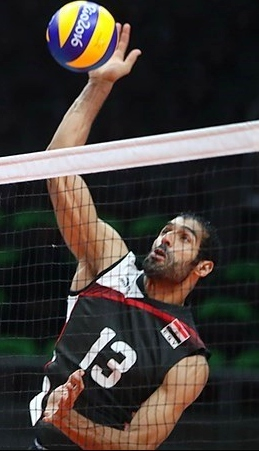
- Badawy at the 2016 Olympics

Personal information
- Nationality: Egyptian
- Born: 11 January 1986 (age 40); Giza, Egypt
- Height: 1.95 m (6 ft 5 in)
- Weight: 91 kg (201 lb)
- Spike: 335 cm (132 in)
- Block: 322 cm (127 in)

Volleyball information
- Current club: Al Ahly SC
- Number: 13

Career
Years	Teams
2001-2011	(Egypt) Zamalek SC
2012	(Italy) Vibo Valentia
2013–2014	(Libya) Al-Ahly SC (Benghazi)
2014–2016	(Egypt) Zamalek SC
2016–now	(Egypt) Al Ahly SC

National team
2006 - present	Egypt
Honours
Men's volleyball
Representing Egypt
African Championship
Gold medal – first place	2007 South Africa
Gold medal – first place	2009 Morocco
Gold medal – first place	2011 Morocco
Gold medal – first place	2013 Tunisia
Gold medal – first place	2015 Egypt
- Last updated: August 2018

Badawy Mohamed Moneim (born 11 January 1986) is an Egyptian male volleyball player. As a member of the Egypt men's national volleyball team he competed at the 2008 and 2016 Olympics and 2010 and 2014 world championships.
