= Mohamed Seif El-Nasr =

Egyptian volleyball player (born 1983)

Personal information
- Nationality: Egyptian
- Born: 5 September 1983 (age 41); Cairo, Egypt

Sport
- Sport: Volleyball

Mohamed Seif El-Nasr (born 5 September 1983) is an Egyptian volleyball player. He competed in the men's tournament at the 2008 Summer Olympics.
