= Mohamed Gabal =

Egyptian volleyball player (born 1984)

Mohamed Gabal (Arabic: محمد جبل) (born January 21, 1984) is an Egyptian indoor volleyball player. He was part of the Egypt national team at the 2008 Summer Olympics. He is a hitter and is 195 cm tall.

== Clubs ==
- Current – (Egypt) Elmahala
- Debut – (Egypt) Elgaish
