= Wael Al-Aydy =

Egyptian volleyball player (born 1971)

Wael Alaydy
Personal information
- Nickname: Al-Aydy
- Nationality: Egyptian
- Born: 8 December 1971 (age 54)
- Height: 1.78 m (5 ft 10 in)
- Weight: 78 kg (172 lb)
- Spike: 320 cm (126 in)
- Block: 300 cm (118 in)

Volleyball information
- Position: Libero
- Number: 6

Career
- Years: Team
- 2010: ZAMALEK

National team
- Years: Team
- 2010: Egypt

Wael Al-Aydy (Arabic: وائل العايدي) (born December 8, 1971) is an Egyptian indoor volleyball player, who played with the Egypt national team at the 2008 Summer Olympics. He plays as a libero. He was part of the Egypt men's national volleyball team at the 2010 FIVB Volleyball Men's World Championship in Italy. He played for ZAMALEK in 2010.

== Clubs ==
- Current – (Egypt) El Tayran
- Debut – (Egypt) AHLY
