= Kevin Hansen (volleyball) =

American volleyball player

Personal information
- Born: Kevin Christopher Hansen; March 19, 1982 (age 44); Newport Beach, California, U.S.
- Height: 6 ft 5 in (196 cm)
- Education: Stanford University

Volleyball information
- Position: Setter

National team
United States
Medal record
Men's volleyball
Representing the United States
Olympic Games
Gold medal – first place	2008 Beijing	Team competition
FIVB World League
Gold medal – first place	2008 Rio de Janeiro	Team competition
Bronze medal – third place	2007 Katowice	Team competition
Pan American Games
Silver medal – second place	2007 Rio de Janeiro	Team competition

Kevin Christopher Hansen (born March 19, 1982) is an American volleyball player. He made his Olympic debut at the 2008 Summer Olympics with the U.S. national team.

== Personal life ==
Hansen was born and raised in Newport Beach, California. He attended high school at Corona del Mar and was named the California Interscholastic Federation (CIF) Most Valuable Player in 2000 and led the volleyball team to the CIF Division I Championship the same season.

Hansen is a type I diabetic, first diagnosed when he was 10 years old, and manages his condition with insulin injections at least four times a day.

== College ==
Hansen continued on to Stanford University from 2000 until 2005 (as he redshirted his freshman year), and majored in economics.

He finished his career third on Stanford's list of career leaders with 5,036 assists, thus becoming just the third player in Stanford men's volleyball history to eclipse 5,000 career assists. He was an American Volleyball Coaches Association (AVCA) First-Team All-American as a fifth year senior in 2005.

== U.S. national team ==
Hansen joined the U.S. national team in June 2005, primarily as the backup setter to veteran player Lloy Ball.

=== International competition ===
In 2008, he played at the FIVB World League, where Team USA won the gold medal. In 2007, he participated in Americas' Cup, earning a gold medal, the Pan American Games, earning a silver medal, and the FIVB World League, earning a bronze medal. His first major international competition was in 2005 at the World University Games.

=== Olympics ===
Hansen made his Olympic debut at the 2008 Summer Olympics.
