= Yusuke Ishijima =

Japanese volleyball player (born 1984)

Personal information
- Nationality: Japanese
- Born: 9 January 1984 (age 42) Matsubushi, Saitama, Japan
- Height: 1.98 m (6 ft 6 in)
- Weight: 100 kg (220 lb)
- Spike: 345 cm (136 in)
- Block: 335 cm (132 in)

Volleyball information
- Position: Outside hitter

Career
- Years: Team
- 2005–2006: (Japan) Osaka Blazers Sakai
- 2005–2006: (Brazil) Ulbra/Canoas
- 2006–2017: (Japan) Osaka Blazers Sakai

National team
- Years: Team
- 2008–2013: Japan

Yusuke Ishijima (石島 雄介, Ishijima Yūsuke; born 9 January 1984) is a former Japanese male volleyball player. He was part of the Japan men's national volleyball team. He competed with the national team at the 2008 Summer Olympics in Beijing, China. He played with Osaka Blazers Sakai in 2005–2006 season, then transferred to Italian club one season and backed to Sakai again until 2017.

He also participated in the 2020 Summer Olympics in Tokyo in beach volleyball.

== See also ==
- Japan at the 2008 Summer Olympics
