= Yoshihiko Matsumoto =

Japanese volleyball player (born 1981)

Personal information
- Nationality: Japanese
- Born: 7 January 1981 (age 44); Nagano, Japan

Sport
- Sport: Volleyball

Yoshihiko Matsumoto (松本 慶彦, Matsumoto Yoshihiko, born 7 January 1981) is a Japanese volleyball player. He competed in the men's tournament at the 2008 Summer Olympics.
