= Hossameldin Gomaa =

Egyptian volleyball player (born 1984)

Personal information
- Nationality: Egyptian
- Born: 15 February 1984 (age 41)

Sport
- Sport: Volleyball

Hossameldin Gomaa (born 15 February 1984) is an Egyptian volleyball player. He competed in the men's tournament at the 2008 Summer Olympics.
