= Ashraf Abouelhassan =

Egyptian indoor volleyball player

Personal information
- Nationality: Egyptian
- Born: 17 May 1975 (age 51); Giza, Egypt
- Height: 184 cm (6 ft 0 in)

Volleyball information
- Position: setter

National team
2000-2002	Egypt

Ashraf Abouelhassan Mahmud (Arabic: أشرف أبو الحسن, born 17 May 1975) is an Egyptian indoor volleyball player. He was included in the Egypt men's national volleyball team that finished 11th at the 2000 Summer Olympics in Sydney, Australia. He is setter and is 184 cm tall. He plays for Zamalek

== Clubs ==
- Current – (Libya) Ahly Benghazi
- Debut – (Egypt) Zamalek
