= Mahmoud Abd El Kader =

Egyptian volleyball player (born 1985)

Personal information
- Nationality: Egyptian
- Born: 12 May 1985
- Height: 1.95 m (6 ft 5 in)
- Weight: 94 kg (207 lb)

Sport
- Sport: Volleyball

Mahmoud Abd El Kader (born 12 May 1985) is an Egyptian volleyball player. He competed in the 2008 Summer Olympics.
