= China men's national volleyball team =

China
- Association: Chinese Volleyball Association (CVA)
- Confederation: AVC
- Head coach: Vital Heynen
- FIVB ranking: 34 (15 October 2026)

Uniforms
Home	Away	Third

Summer Olympics
- Appearances: 2 (First in 1984)
- Best result: 5th (2008)

World Championship
- Appearances: 16 (First in 1956)
- Best result: 7th (1978, 1982)

World Cup
- Appearances: 6 (First in 1977)
- Best result: 5th (1977, 1981)

Asian Championship
- Appearances: 21 (First in 1975)
- Best result: (1979, 1997, 1999)
- www.volleyballchina.com (in Chinese)
Honours
Event	1st	2nd	3rd
Challenger Cup	1	0	0
Asian Championship	3	6	6
Asian Games	3	4	2
Asian Cup	2	2	1
Total	9	12	9
Medal record
Challenger Cup
Gold medal – first place	2024 Linyi	Team
Asian Championship
Gold medal – first place	1979 Manama	Team
Gold medal – first place	1997 Doha	Team
Gold medal – first place	1999 Tehran	Team
Silver medal – second place	1983 Tokyo	Team
Silver medal – second place	1987 Kuwait	Team
Silver medal – second place	1995 Seoul	Team
Silver medal – second place	2003 Tianjin	Team
Silver medal – second place	2005 Suphanburi	Team
Silver medal – second place	2011 Tehran	Team
Bronze medal – third place	1975 Melbourne	Team
Bronze medal – third place	1989 Seoul	Team
Bronze medal – third place	1991 Perth	Team
Bronze medal – third place	2013 Dubai	Team
Bronze medal – third place	2015 Tehran	Team
Bronze medal – third place	2021 Chiba/Funabashi	Team
Asian Games
Gold medal – first place	1986 Seoul	Team
Gold medal – first place	1990 Beijing	Team
Gold medal – first place	1998 Bangkok	Team
Silver medal – second place	1982 New Delhi	Team
Silver medal – second place	1994 Hiroshima	Team
Silver medal – second place	2006 Doha	Team
Silver medal – second place	2022 Hangzhou	Team
Bronze medal – third place	1974 Tehran	Team
Bronze medal – third place	1978 Bangkok	Team
Asian Cup
Gold medal – first place	2012 Vinh Yen	Team
Gold medal – first place	2022 Nakhon Pathom	Team
Silver medal – second place	2010 Urmia	Team
Silver medal – second place	2016 Nakhon Pathom	Team
Bronze medal – third place	2008 Nakhon Ratchasima	Team

The China men's national volleyball team (Chinese: 中国国家男子排球队) represents China in international volleyball competitions and friendly matches, governed by Chinese Volleyball Association. The team now ranks 28th in the FIVB World Rankings and the current head coach is Vital Heynen.

The team competed twice in the Olympic Games, finishing in eighth place at the 1984 Summer Olympics in Los Angeles, California, and fifth place in the 2008 Summer Olympics at home in Beijing. China have been consistently competing the FIVB World Championship, with a best of seventh place in both 1978 and 1982. On a continental level, China won three gold medals at the Asian Games, in 1986, 1990 and 1998. China also won 3 gold medals at the Asian Championship in 1979, 1997 and 1999.

== Competition record ==
=== Olympic Games ===
Champions Runners up Third place Fourth place

Olympic Games record									Qualification record				
Year	Round	Position	GP	MW	ML	SW	SL	Squad	GP	MW	ML	SW	SL
(Japan) 1964	did not participate or did not qualify								did not participate				
(Mexico) 1968	did not participate or did not qualify								Unknown Asian qualifier				
(West Germany) 1972	did not participate or did not qualify								did not participate				
(Canada) 1976	did not participate or did not qualify								1975 Asian Championship				
(Soviet Union) 1980	qualified but later withdrew due to US-led boycott								1979 Asian Championship				
(United States) 1984	Preliminary round	8th place	6	1	5	4	15	Squad	5	3	2	13	6
(South Korea) 1988	did not qualify								9	6	3	19	13
(Spain) 1992	did not qualify								5	3	2	9	7
(United States) 1996	did not qualify								3	1	2	3	6
(Greece) 2000	did not qualify								6	3	3	11	11
(Australia) 2004	did not qualify								7	5	2	15	9
(China) 2008	Quarterfinals	5th place	6	2	4	9	19	Squad	Qualified as host				
(United Kingdom) 2012	did not qualify								7	3	4	13	14
(Brazil) 2016	did not qualify								7	2	5	14	15
(Japan) 2020	did not qualify								8	4	4	16	16
(France) 2024	did not qualify								7	1	6	10	18
(United States) 2028	Future events								Future events				
(Australia) 2032	Future events								Future events				
Total	2/18		12	3	9	13	34	—	64	31	33	123	115

=== World Cup ===
Champions Runners up Third place Fourth place

World Cup record
Year	Round	Position	GP	MW	ML	SW	SL	Squad
(Czechoslovakia) 1949	did not participate							
(Soviet Union) 1952	did not participate							
(France) 1956	Final group	9th place	11	3	8	12	27	Squad
(Brazil) 1960	did not participate							
(Soviet Union) 1962	Final group	9th place	12	5	7	19	21	Squad
(Czechoslovakia) 1966	9th–16th places	9th place	12	10	2	33	11	Squad
(Bulgaria) 1970	did not qualify							
(Mexico) 1974	13th–18th places	15th place	11	7	4	22	15	Squad
(Italy) 1978	5th–8th places	7th place	9	5	4	20	16	Squad
(Argentina) 1982	5th–8th places	7th place	9	6	3	21	9	Squad
(France) 1986	9th–12th places	12th place	8	1	7	4	21	Squad
(Brazil) 1990	did not qualify							
(Greece) 1994	First round	15th place	3	1	2	3	6	Squad
(Japan) 1998	Second round	15th place	10	2	8	11	23	Squad
(Argentina) 2002	Second round	13th place	6	1	5	6	16	Squad
(Japan) 2006	First round	17th place	5	2	3	9	13	Squad
(Italy) 2010	First round	19th place	3	0	3	1	9	Squad
(Poland) 2014	Second round	15th place	9	4	5	12	21	Squad
(Italy) (Bulgaria) 2018	First round	22nd place	5	0	5	3	15	Squad
(Poland) (Slovenia) 2022	First round	24th place	3	0	3	0	9	Squad
(Philippines) 2025	Preliminary round	30th place	3	0	3	1	9	Squad
(Poland) 2027	to be determined							
(Qatar) 2029	to be determined							
Total	16/23		119	47	72	177	241	—

=== World Cup (1965–2019) ===
Champions Runners up Third place Fourth place

World Cup (1965–2019) record (Defunct)
Year	Round	Position	GP	MW	ML	SW	SL	Squad
(Poland) 1965	did not qualify							
(East Germany) 1969	did not qualify							
(Japan) 1977	5th–8th places	5th place	8	4	4	17	12	Squad
(Japan) 1981	Round robin	5th place	7	3	4	12	14	Squad
(Japan) 1985	did not qualify							
(Japan) 1989	did not qualify							
(Japan) 1991	did not qualify							
(Japan) 1995	Round robin	9th place	11	3	8	11	26	Squad
(Japan) 1999	Round robin	11th place	11	1	10	10	31	Squad
(Japan) 2003	Round robin	10th place	11	2	9	13	28	Squad
(Japan) 2007	did not participate (as their country hosted the 2008 Summer Olympics)							
(Japan) 2011	Round robin	11th place	11	1	10	9	30	Squad
(Japan) 2015	did not qualify							
(Japan) 2019	did not qualify							
Total	6/14		59	14	45	72	141	—

=== World Grand Champions Cup ===
Champions Runners up Third place Fourth place

World Grand Champions Cup record (Defunct)
Year	Round	Position	GP	MW	ML	SW	SL	Squad
(Japan) 1993	did not qualify							
(Japan) 1997	Round robin	4th place	5	3	2	9	10	Squad
(Japan) 2001	did not qualify							
(Japan) 2005	Round robin	6th place	5	0	5	6	15	Squad
(Japan) 2009	did not qualify							
(Japan) 2013	did not qualify							
(Japan) 2017	did not qualify							
Total	2/7		10	3	7	15	25	—

=== World League ===
Champions Runners up Third place Fourth place

World League record (Defunct)
Year	Round	Position	GP	MW	ML	SW	SL	Squad
(Japan) 1990	Intercontinental round	8th place	12	0	12	2	36	Squad
(Italy) 1991	did not participate							
(Italy) 1992	Intercontinental round	9th place	12	3	9	17	31	Squad
(Brazil) 1993	Intercontinental round	7th place	20	9	11	36	40	Squad
(Italy) 1994	Intercontinental round	11th place	12	1	11	5	33	Squad
(Brazil) 1995	Intercontinental round	11th place	12	4	8	18	28	Squad
(Netherlands) 1996	Final round	6th place	16	4	12	20	40	Squad
(Russia) 1997	Intercontinental round	10th place	12	2	10	8	31	Squad
(Italy) 1998	did not participate							
(Argentina) 1999	did not participate							
(Netherlands) 2000	did not participate							
(Poland) 2001	did not participate							
(Brazil) 2002	Intercontinental round	9th place	12	4	8	21	27	Squad
(Spain) 2003	did not participate							
(Italy) 2004	Intercontinental round	10th place	12	3	9	14	31	Squad
(Serbia and Montenegro) 2005	did not participate							
(Russia) 2006	Intercontinental round	13th place	12	0	12	4	36	Squad
(Poland) 2007	Intercontinental round	9th place	12	4	8	18	29	Squad
(Brazil) 2008	Intercontinental round	7th place	12	6	6	24	23	Squad
(Serbia) 2009	Intercontinental round	13th place	12	3	9	14	29	Squad
(Argentina) 2010	Intercontinental round	15th place	12	1	11	11	34	Squad
(Poland) 2011	did not qualify							
(Bulgaria) 2012	did not qualify							
(Argentina) 2013	did not participate							
(Italy) 2014	G3 Final round	23rd place	8	6	2	20	10	Squad
(Brazil) 2015	G3 Final round	24th place	8	6	2	21	15	Squad
(Poland) 2016	G2 Intercontinental round	19th place	9	4	5	13	17	Squad
(Brazil) 2017	G2 Intercontinental round	17th place	9	5	4	19	16	Squad
Total	18/28		214	65	149	285	506	—

=== Nations League ===
Champions Runners up Third place Fourth place

Nations League record
Year	Round	Position	GP	MW	ML	SW	SL	Squad
(France) 2018	Preliminary round	15th place	15	3	12	15	39	Squad
(United States) 2019	Preliminary round	16th place	15	1	14	9	42	Squad
(Italy) 2021	qualified but withdrew							
(Italy) 2022	Preliminary round	13th place	12	3	9	14	28	Squad
(Poland) 2023	Preliminary round	16th place	12	2	10	12	33	Squad
(Poland) 2024	did not qualify							
(China) 2025	Final round	8th place	13	3	10	13	33	Squad
(China) 2026	Final round	8th place	13	1	12	11	36	Squad
(N/A) 2027	qualified							
Total	7/9		80	13	67	74	211	—

=== Challenger Cup ===
Champions Runners up Third place Fourth place

Challenger Cup record (Defunct)
Year	Round	Position	GP	MW	ML	SW	SL	Squad
(Portugal) 2018	did not participate (Note: China participated in Nations League)							
(Slovenia) 2019	did not participate							
(South Korea) 2022	did not participate							
(Qatar) 2023	Quarterfinals	5th place	1	0	1	1	3	Squad
(China) 2024	Final	(gold) Champions	3	3	0	9	1	Squad
Total	1 Title	2/5	4	3	1	10	4	—

=== AVC Continental Championship ===
Champions Runners up Third place Fourth place

AVC Continental Championship record
Year	Round	Position	GP	MW	ML	SW	SL	Squad
(Australia) 1975	Round robin	(bronze) 3rd place	6	4	2	14	6	Squad
(Bahrain) 1979	Round robin	(gold) Champions	6	6	0	18	1	Squad
(Japan) 1983	Round robin	(silver) Runners up	8	6	2	21	11	Squad
(Kuwait) 1987	Final round	(silver) Runners up	7	6	1	21	N/A	Squad
(South Korea) 1989	Final round	(bronze) 3rd place	8	6	2	20	11	Squad
(Australia) 1991	Round robin	(bronze) 3rd place	7	5	2	18	6	Squad
(Thailand) 1993	Final round	4th place	8	5	3	18	9	Squad
(South Korea) 1995	Round robin	(silver) Runners up	N/A					Squad
(Qatar) 1997	Round robin	(gold) Champions	5	5	0	15	1	Squad
(Iran) 1999	Round robin	(gold) Champions	6	5	1	16	3	Squad
(South Korea) 2001	Final round	4th place	6	3	3	10	11	Squad
(China) 2003	Round robin	(silver) Runners up	6	5	1	17	4	Squad
(Thailand) 2005	Final round	(silver) Runners Up	5	4	1	12	8	Squad
(Indonesia) 2007	Round robin	4th place	7	5	2	15	13	Squad
(Philippines) 2009	Final round	4th place	8	5	3	20	10	Squad
(Iran) 2011	Final round	(silver) Runners up	8	5	3	19	11	Squad
(United Arab Emirates) 2013	Final round	(bronze) 3rd place	7	6	1	20	6	Squad
(Iran) 2015	Final round	(bronze) 3rd place	8	7	1	23	8	Squad
(Indonesia) 2017	Final round	6th place	8	4	4	14	12	Squad
(Iran) 2019	Final round	6th place	8	4	4	15	14	Squad
(Japan) 2021	Final round	(bronze) 3rd place	7	5	2	18	9	Squad
(Iran) 2023	Final round	4th place	6	4	2	12	13	Squad
(Japan) 2026	Final round	6th place	4	2	2	8	6	–
Total	3 Titles	23/23	–	–	–	–	–	—

=== Asian Games ===
Champions Runners up Third place Fourth place

Asian Games record
Year	Round	Position	GP	MW	ML	SW	SL	Squad
(Japan) 1958	did not participate							
(Indonesia) 1962	did not participate							
(Thailand) 1966	did not participate							
(Thailand) 1970	did not participate							
(Iran) 1974	Final round	3rd place	5	3	2	10	8	Squad
(Thailand) 1978	Round robin	3rd place	9	8	1	24	4	Squad
(India) 1982	Round robin	Runners up	6	5	1	15	5	Squad
(South Korea) 1986	Round robin	Champions	8	8	0	24	2	Squad
(China) 1990	Final round	Champions	6	6	0	18	3	Squad
(Japan) 1994	Final round	Runners up	5	4	1	14	4	Squad
(Thailand) 1998	Final round	Champions	6	6	0	18	2	Squad
(South Korea) 2002	Final round	4th place	5	3	2	13	9	Squad
(Qatar) 2006	Final	Runners up	3	2	1	7	6	Squad
(China) 2010	Final round	5th place	8	6	2	18	8	Squad
(South Korea) 2014	Final round	4th place	8	5	3	19	8	Squad
(Indonesia) 2018	Final round	9th place	6	3	3	13	12	Squad
(China) 2022	Final	Runners up	5	4	1	13	4	Squad
(Japan) 2026	Final round	4th place	6	4	2	14	10	Squad
Total	3 Titles	14/18	86	67	19	220	85	—

=== AVC Cup ===
Champions Runners up Third place Fourth place

AVC Cup record
Year	Round	Position	GP	MW	ML	SW	SL	Squad
(Sri Lanka) 2018	did not participate							
(Kyrgyzstan) 2022	did not participate							
(Taiwan) 2023	did not participate							
(Bahrain) 2024	5th–8th places	5th place	5	4	1	12	6	Squad
(Bahrain) 2025	did not participate							
(India) 2026	did not participate							
Total	1/6		5	4	1	12	6	—

=== AVC Cup for Men ===
Champions Runners up Third place Fourth place

AVC Cup for Men record (Defunct)
Year	Round	Position	GP	MW	ML	SW	SL	Squad
(Thailand) 2008	Final round	3rd place	6	3	3	14	9	Squad
(Iran) 2010	Final round	Runners up	6	4	2	14	9	Squad
(Vietnam) 2012	Final round	Champions	6	5	1	17	4	Squad
(Kazakhstan) 2014	Final round	5th place	6	4	2	14	10	U20 Squad
(Thailand) 2016	Final round	Runners up	6	5	1	16	5	Squad
(Taiwan) 2018	qualified but withdrew							
(Thailand) 2022	Final round	Champions	6	6	0	18	5	Squad
Total	2 Titles	6/7	36	27	9	93	42	—

== Team ==
=== Current squad ===
The following is the China roster for the 2026 FIVB Men's Volleyball Nations League.

Head Coach: (Belgium) Vital Heynen

No.	Name	Date of birth	Pos.	Height	Weight	Spike	Block	2025–26 club
1	Wen Zihua	25 November 1999 (age 26)	OP	2.01 m (6 ft 7 in)	83 kg (183 lb)	363 cm (143 in)	358 cm (141 in)	(China) Baoding Woli
2	Jiang Chuan	9 August 1994 (age 32)	OP	2.05 m (6 ft 9 in)	91 kg (201 lb)	360 cm (140 in)	350 cm (140 in)	(China) Beijing BAIC Motor
3	Wang Hebin	27 June 1999 (age 27)	S	1.88 m (6 ft 2 in)	80 kg (180 lb)	350 cm (140 in)	345 cm (136 in)	(China) Guangdong Taishan Heli
4	Li Lei	23 April 2001 (age 25)	OH	2.01 m (6 ft 7 in)	94 kg (207 lb)	345 cm (136 in)	335 cm (132 in)	(China) Qingdao Xinglun Youyou
5	Hu Hanlin	22 February 2008 (age 18)	MB	2.05 m (6 ft 9 in)	80 kg (180 lb)	330 cm (130 in)	325 cm (128 in)	(China) Qingdao Xinglun Youyou
6	Yu Yuantai	3 December 1997 (age 28)	OH	1.86 m (6 ft 1 in)	81 kg (179 lb)	345 cm (136 in)	340 cm (130 in)	(China) Jiangsu
7	Li Tianyue	22 October 2001 (age 25)	L	1.85 m (6 ft 1 in)	80 kg (180 lb)	360 cm (140 in)	350 cm (140 in)	(China) Jiangsu
9	Li Yongzhen	7 August 1998 (age 28)	MB	1.98 m (6 ft 6 in)	85 kg (187 lb)	345 cm (136 in)	340 cm (130 in)	(Portugal) Sporting CP
11	Wu Zhai	10 October 1997 (age 29)	S	1.89 m (6 ft 2 in)	80 kg (180 lb)	335 cm (132 in)	325 cm (128 in)	(China) Fujian Fuqing
12	Zhang Zhejia	31 August 1995 (age 31)	MB	2.08 m (6 ft 10 in)	100 kg (220 lb)	355 cm (140 in)	345 cm (136 in)	(China) Shanghai Bright
13	Fan Xuanyu	13 October 2002 (age 24)	S	1.95 m (6 ft 5 in)	70 kg (150 lb)	335 cm (132 in)	325 cm (128 in)	(China) Qingdao Xinglun Youyou
15	Peng Shikun	26 August 2000 (age 26)	MB	2.08 m (6 ft 10 in)	100 kg (220 lb)	355 cm (140 in)	345 cm (136 in)	(Japan) Osaka Bluteon
16	Qu Zongshuai	20 January 1999 (age 27)	L	1.86 m (6 ft 1 in)	80 kg (180 lb)	320 cm (130 in)	310 cm (120 in)	(China) Shanghai Bright
18	Wang Changli	10 August 2002 (age 24)	MB	2.05 m (6 ft 9 in)	85 kg (187 lb)	355 cm (140 in)	345 cm (136 in)	(China) Tianjin Food Group
23	Wang Bin	23 June 2001 (age 25)	OH	1.95 m (6 ft 5 in)	95 kg (209 lb)	335 cm (132 in)	330 cm (130 in)	(China) Zhejiang Zhende
24	Yang Baoqi	28 August 2004 (age 22)	OH	1.97 m (6 ft 6 in)	92 kg (203 lb)	361 cm (142 in)	356 cm (140 in)	(China) Baoding Woli
25	Li Hai	17 November 2005 (age 20)	OP	2.01 m (6 ft 7 in)	75 kg (165 lb)	350 cm (140 in)	330 cm (130 in)	(China) Qingdao Xinglun Youyou
27	Xue Zhihong	27 October 2001 (age 25)	OH	1.95 m (6 ft 5 in)	74 kg (163 lb)	342 cm (135 in)	320 cm (130 in)	(China) Tianjin Food Group

=== Former squads ===
List of former squads

Olympic Games

- 1984

Cao Ping, Liu Changcheng, Shen Keqin, Song Jinwei, Xiao Qingsong, Yang Liqun, Yan Jianming, Yu Juemin, Ju Jixin, Zhang Yousheng, Zhao Feng, Zuo Yue. Head coach: Zou Zhihua.

- 2008

Bian Hongmin, Yuan Zhi, Guo Peng, Shi Hairong, Cui Jianjun, Jiao Shuai, Yu Dawei, Shen Qiong, Jiang Fudong, Ren Qi, Sui Shengsheng, Fang Yingchao. Head coach: Zhou Jianan.

FIVB Volleyball Men's Olympic Qualification Tournaments

- 2023

Jiang Chuan (c), Wang Dongchen, Wang Hebin, Yang Yiming, Yu Yuantai, Yu Yaochen, Li Yongzhen, Peng Shikun, Qu Zongshuai, Zhang Guanhua, Miao Ruantong, Zhang Jingyin, Wang Bin, Dai Qingyao. Head coach: Wu Sheng.

FIVB Men's Volleyball World Championship

- 1994

Weng Yiqing, Zhang Di, Li Haiyun, Hou Jing, Li Mu, Lu Weizhong, Zhang Liming, Zhou Jianan, Chen Feng, Zheng Liang, Zhang Xiang, Yan Feng, An Jiajie, Xie Guochen. Head Coach: Fulin Shen.

- 1998

Zheng Liang, Chen Qi, Lu Weizhong, Zhang Liming, Zhou Jianan, Chen Fang, Wang Hebing, Zhang Xiang, Zhao Yong, An Jiajie, Zhu Gang, Li Tieming. Head Coach: Wang Jiawei.

- 2002

Shi Hairong (c), Zhang Xiaodong, Sui Shengsheng, Zheng Liang, Lu Fei, Tang Miao, He Jiong, Li Hang, Shen Qiong, Wang Haichuan, Chu Hui, Li Chun. Head Coach: Di Anhe.

- 2006

Cui Xiaodong, Yuan Zhi, Guo Peng, Wang Haichuan, Tang Miao, Cui Jianjun, Li Chun, Yu Dawei, Shen Qiong, Jiang Fudong, Ren Qi, Sui Shengsheng. Head Coach: Zhou Jianan.

- 2010

Bian Hongmin, Yuan Zhi, Zhang Chen, Guo Peng, Liang Chunlong, Zhong Weijun, Cui Jianjun, Jiao Shuai, Chen Ping, Shen Qiong, Li Runming, Ren Qi. Head Coach: Zhou Jianan.

- 2014

Chen Longhai, Yuan Zhi, Liang Chunlong, Zhong Weijun, Cui Jianjun, Jiao Shuai, Geng Xin, Kong Fanwei, Kou Zhichao, Xu Jingtao, Li Runming, Ren Qi, Ji Daoshuai, Fang Yingchao. Head Coach: Xie Guochen.

- 2018

Ji Daoshuai (c), Jiang Chuan, Mao Tianyi, Zhang Binglong, Zhang Jingyin, Yu Yaochen, Du Haixiang, Chen Longhai, Tang Chuanhang, Tong Jiahua, Liu Libin, Rao Shuhan, Miao Ruantong, Ma Xiaoteng. Head Coach: Raúl Lozano.

- 2022

Yu Yaochen (c), Dai Qingyao, Yang Yiming, Zhang Binglong, Yu Yuantai, Yang Tianyuan, Li Yongzhen, Liu Meng, Zhang Zhejia, Peng Shikun, Zhang Guanhua, Miao Ruantong, Zhang Jingyin, Wang Bin. Head Coach: Wu Sheng.

- 2025

Jiang Chuan (c), Wen Zihua, Wang Hebin, Li Lei, Yu Yuantai, Yu Yaochen, Li Yongzhen, Ji Daoshuai, Zhang Zhejia, Peng Shikun, Qu Zongshuai, Wang Bin, Li Tianyue, Liu Libin. Head coach: Vital Heynen.
FIVB Volleyball Men's World Cup

- 2003

Shi Hairong (c), Zhang Xiaodong, Hu Song, Yuan Zhi, Cui Xiaodong, Tang Miao, He Jiong, Li Hang, Li Chun, Shen Qiong, Wu Xiaojiang, Chu Hui. Head Coach: Di Anhe.

- 2011

Cui Jianjun (c), Bian Hongmin, Zhan Guojun, Yuan Zhi, Zhang Chen, Liang Chunlong, Zhong Weijun, Chen Ping, Geng Xin, Xu Jingtao, Li Runming, Ren Qi, Kong Fanwei, Song Jianwei. Head Coach: Zhou Jianan.

FIVB Volleyball Men's World Grand Champions Cup

- 1997

Sui Shengsheng (c), Xie Wenhao, Yuan Zhi, Guo Peng, Tang Miao, Zhang Chen, He Jiong, Li Chun, Shen Qiong, Fang Yingchao, Chu Hui, Yu Dawei. Head Coach: Di Anhe.

FIVB Volleyball World League

- 2009

Shen Qiong (c), Bian Hongmin, Dai Qingyao, Guo Peng, Liang Chunlong, Zhong Weijun, Cui Jianjun, Jiao Shuai, Chen Ping, Yu Dawei, Jiang Kun, Li Runming, Ren Qi, Ding Hui. Head Coach: Zhou Jian'an.

- 2010

Shen Qiong (c), Bian Hongmin, Yuan Zhi, Zhang Chen, Liang Chunlong, Zhong Weijun, Cui Jianjun, Jiao Shuai, Chen Ping, Yu Dawei, Jiang Kun, Xu Jingtao, Li Runming, Ren Qi, Ding Hui. Head Coach: Zhou Jian'an.

- 2014

Zhong Weijun (c), Bian Hongmin, Yuan Zhi, Zhang Chen, Liang Chunlong, Cui Jianjun, Jiao Shuai, Geng Xin, Kou Zhichao, Li Runming, Chu Hui, Ji Daoshuai. Head Coach: Xie Guochen.

- 2015

Jiao Shuai (c), Zhang Zhejia, Yuan Zhi, Zhang Chen, Li Yuanbo, Li Runming, Cui Jianjun, Ji Daoshuai, Geng Xin, Dai Qingyao, Rao Shuhan, Tong Jiahua, Ke Junhuang, Song Jianwei. Head Coach: Xie Guochen.

- 2016

Chen Longhai, Zhang Chen, Li Yuanbo, Li Runming, Cui Jianjun, Jiao Shuai (c), Ji Daoshuai, Geng Xin, Rao Shuhan, Dai Qingyao, Tong Jiahua, Ke Junhuang, Liu Xiangdong and Song Jianwei. Head Coach: Yang Liqun (Week 1 and Week 2), Xie Guochen (Week 3).

- 2017

Zhong Weijun (c), Li Rui, Jiang Chuan, Mao Tianyi, Zhang Binglong, Li Runming, Han Tianyi, Zhan Guojun, Ji Daoshuai, Chen Longhai, Tong Jiahua, Ke Junhuang, Tang Chuanhang, Liu Libin and Rao Shuhan. Head Coach: Raúl Lozano.

FIVB Men's Volleyball Nations League

- 2018

Ji Daoshuai (c), Jiang Chuan, Mao Tianyi, Yu Yaochen, Du Haixiang, Chen Longhai, Tang Chuanhang, Tong Jiahua, Liu Libin, Rao Shuhan, Miao Ruantong, Zhang Zuyuan, Chen Jiajie. Head coach: Raúl Lozano.

- 2019

Ji Daoshuai (c), Dai Qingyao, Jiang Chuan, Mao Tianyi, Wang Jingyi, Yu Yaochen, Du Haixiang, Zhang Zhejia, Chen Longhai, Tong Jiahua, Liu Libin, Rao Shuhan, Peng Shikun, Chen Jiajie, Ma Xiaoteng. Head Coach: Raúl Lozano.

- 2022

Yu Yaochen (c), Yang Yiming, Zhang Binglong, Yu Yuantai, Yang Tianyuan, Li Yongzhen, Jiang Zhengyang, Peng Shikun, Wang Hebin, Wang Jingyi, Yuan Dangyi, Zhang Guanhua, Miao Ruantong, Zhang Jingyin. Head coach: Wu Sheng.

- 2023

Jiang Chuan (c), Wang Dongchen, Wang Hebin, Yang Yiming, Yu Yuantai, Guo Cheng, Li Yongzhen, Liu Meng, Zhai Dejun, Peng Shikun, Qu Zongshuai, Chen Leiyang, Zhang Guanhua, Rao Shuhan, Zhang Jingyin, Wang Bin. Head coach: Wu Sheng.

- 2025

Jiang Chuan (c), Wen Zihua, Wang Hebin, Yu Yuantai, Yu Yaochen, Li Yongzhen, Ji Daoshuai, Zhang Zhejia, Zhai Dejun, Peng Shikun, Qu Zongshuai, Rao Shuhan, Miao Ruantong, Zhang Jingyin, Wang Bin, Li Tianyue. Head coach: Vital Heynen.

FIVB Volleyball Men's Challenger Cup

- 2023

Yu Yaochen (c), Li Lei, Yu Yuantai, Guo Cheng, Li Yongzhen, Zhai Dejun, Qu Zongshuai, Rao Shuhan, Miao Ruantong, Zhang Jingyin, Wen Zihua, Dai Qingyao. Head coach: Wu Sheng.

- 2024

Jiang Chuan (c), Wang Hebin, Li Lei, Yu Yuantai, Wang Dongchen, Li Yongzhen, Yang Tianyuan, Zhai Dejun, Peng Shikun, Qu Zongshuai, Wang Jingyi, Rao Shuhan, Zhang Jingyin, Mao Tianyi. Head coach: Vital Heynen.

Asian Men's Volleyball Championship

- 2021

Jiang Chuan (c), Zhang Binglong, Yang Yiming, Yu Yuantai, Yu Yaochen, Yang Tianyuan, Li Yongzhen, Liu Meng, Jiang Zhengyang, Peng Shikun, Zhang Guanhua, Yuan Dangyi, Miao Ruantong, Zhang Jingyin. Head Coach: Wu Sheng.

Asian Games

- 1974

Chen Fulin, Dong Chuanqiang, Fu Yuting, Jiang Shensheng, Wang Chuan, Wang Dexue, Yu Youwei, Yuan Liubin, Yuan Weimin, Zhang Yuan, Zhao Chengqing, Zhu Jiaming. Head Coach:

- 1978

Chen Fulin, Chen Gang, Hou Jie, Hu Jin, Li Jianxin, Wang Jiawei, Wang Qingheng, Xu Zhen, Zheng Zongyuan, Zhou Zhongyu. Head Coach: Dai Tingbin.

- 1982

Cao Ping, Chen Fulin, Chen Gang, Guo Ming, Hou Xiaofei, Hu Jin, Pan Lijun, Wang Jiawei, Wang Tieshan, Xu Zhen, Xue Yongye, Yu Yansen. Head Coach: Dai Tingbin.

- 1986

Jiang Jie, Ju Genyin, Liu Changcheng, Lu Cheng, Ma Jun, Song Jinwei, Wang Jiawei, Yang Liqun, Yu Yiqing, Zhang Renjiang, Zhao Duo, Zuo Yue. Head Coach: Zou Zhihua.

- 1990

Cao Maowen, Jiang Jie, Ju Genyin, Li Haiyun, Su Xuehui, Weng Yiqing, Wu Wei, Xu Guorong, Yan Feng, Zhang Jianwei, Zhang Renjiang, Zhou Jianan. Head Coach: Yu Youwei.

- 1994

Chen Feng, Hou Jing, Li Haiyun, Lu Weizhong, Weng Yiqing, Xie Guochen, Yan Feng, Zhang Di, Zhang Liming, Zhang Xiang, Zheng Liang, Zhou Jianan. Head Coach: Shen Fulin.

- 1998

Chen Fang, Chen Qi, An Jiajie, Li Tieming, Lu Weizhong, Wang Hebing, Zhang Liming, Zhang Xiang, Zhao Yong, Zheng Liang, Zhou Jianan, Zhu Gang. Head Coach: Wang Jiawei.

- 2002

Liu Guangxin, Wang Ye, Ma Ming, Hu Song, An Jiajie, Guo Liang, Wang Jin, Yuan Zhi, Xie Guochen, Zhang Xiang, Wang Jianli, Liu Wei. Head Coach: Di Anhe.

- 2006

Cui Xiaodong, Yuan Zhi, Guo Peng, Wang Haichuan, Tang Miao, Cui Jianjun, Li Chun, Yu Dawei, Shen Qiong, Jiang Fudong, Ren Qi, Sui Shengsheng.

- 2010

Bian Hongmin, Yuan Zhi, Zhang Chen, Guo Peng, Liang Chunlong, Zhong Weijun, Cui Jianjun, Jiao Shuai, Chen Ping, Shen Qiong, Li Runming, Ren Qi. Head Coach: Zhou Jianan.

- 2014

Zhong Weijun (c), Yuan Zhi, Zhang Chen, Liang Chunlong, Cui Jianjun, Geng Xin, Kou Zhichao, Xu Jingtao, Li Runming, Ren Qi, Ji Daoshuai, Mao Tianyi. Head Coach: Xie Guochen.

- 2018

Li Rui, Yu Yuantai, Zhang Chen, Zhong Weijun, Li Runming, Wang Jingyi, Yuan Dangyi, Zhan Guojun, Li Liye, Li Yuanbo, Zhang Zhejia, Peng Shikun, Ren Qi, Chen Jiajie. Head Coach: Raúl Lozano.

- 2022

Jiang Chuan (c), Wang Dongchen, Wang Hebin, Yu Yuantai, Yu Yaochen, Li Yongzhen, Peng Shikun, Qu Zongshuai, Zhang Guanhua, Zhang Jingyin, Wang Bin, Dai Qingyao. Head Coach: Wu Sheng.

Asian Men's Volleyball Cup

- 2022

Yu Yaochen (c), Dai Qingyao, Qu Zongshuai, Yang Yiming, Zhang Binglong, Yu Yuantai, Li Yongzhen, Liu Meng, Jiang Zhengyang, Zhang Zhejia, Peng Shikun, Zhang Guanhua, Zhang Jingyin, Wang Bin. Head Coach: Wu Sheng.

AVC Men's Challenge Cup

- 2024

Jiang Chuan (c), Wang Hebin, Li Lei, Yu Yuantai, Wang Dongchen, Li Yongzhen, Yang Tianyuan, Zhang Binglong, Zhai Dejun, Peng Shikun, Qu Zongshuai, Wang Jingyi, Zhang Jingyin, Liu Ze. Head coach: Vital Heynen.

== Head coaches ==
Note: The following list may not be complete.

- (China) Dai Tingbin (1977–1982)
- (China) Zhu Jiamin (1983)
- (China) Zou Zhihua (1984–1988)
- (China) Yu Youwei (1989–1990)
- (China) Shen Fulin (1991–1997, 2019)
- (China) Wang Jiawei (1997–2000)
- (China) Di Anhe (2001–2005)
- (China) Zhou Jianan (2005–2012)
- (China) Xie Guochen (2013–2016)
- (Argentina) Raúl Lozano (2017–2019)
- (China) Shen Fulin (2019–2020)
- (China) Wu Sheng (2021–2023)
- (Belgium) Vital Heynen (2024–present)

== Kit providers ==
The table below shows the history of kit providers for the China national volleyball team.

Period	Kit provider
2000–2014	Asics
2015–	Adidas

=== Sponsorship ===
Primary sponsors include: main sponsors like China Construction Bank.

== See also ==
- China women's national volleyball team
- China men's national under-21 volleyball team
- China men's national under-19 volleyball team
