= 2016 AVC Cup for Men squads =

This article shows the rosters of all participating teams at the 2016 AVC Cup for Men in Nakhon Pathom, Thailand.

== Pool A ==
=== Thailand ===
The following is the Thai roster in the 2016 AVC Cup for Men.

- Head coach: Monchai Supajirakul

No.	Name	Date of birth	Height	Weight	Spike	Block	2016 club
1	Jirayu Raksakaew	3 August 1987	1.95 m (6 ft 5 in)	82 kg (181 lb)	345 cm (11 ft 4 in)	330 cm (10 ft 10 in)	(Thailand) Air Force
2	Montri Vaenpadab	18 August 1987	1.93 m (6 ft 4 in)	80 kg (180 lb)	339 cm (11 ft 1 in)	310 cm (10 ft 2 in)	(Thailand) Ratchaburi
4	Kitisak Saengsee	16 January 1995	1.90 m (6 ft 3 in)	85 kg (187 lb)	340 cm (11 ft 2 in)	305 cm (10 ft 0 in)	(Thailand) Air Force
8	Chakkit Chandahuadong	5 November 1996	1.83 m (6 ft 0 in)	72 kg (159 lb)	310 cm (10 ft 2 in)	300 cm (9 ft 10 in)	(Thailand) Nakhon Ratchasima
9	Kittikun Sriutthawong (C)	10 January 1986	1.93 m (6 ft 4 in)	74 kg (163 lb)	338 cm (11 ft 1 in)	306 cm (10 ft 0 in)	(Thailand) NK Fitness
10	Kittinon Namkhunthod	16 July 1992	1.88 m (6 ft 2 in)	73 kg (161 lb)	320 cm (10 ft 6 in)	311 cm (10 ft 2 in)	(Thailand) Wing 46 Phitsanulok
13	Mawin Maneewong	5 October 1996	1.93 m (6 ft 4 in)	75 kg (165 lb)	325 cm (10 ft 8 in)	310 cm (10 ft 2 in)	(Thailand) Air Force
14	Kitsada Somkane	28 September 1990	1.90 m (6 ft 3 in)	77 kg (170 lb)	342 cm (11 ft 3 in)	312 cm (10 ft 3 in)	(Thailand) Nakhon Ratchasima
15	Kittipong Suksala	3 October 1997	2.02 m (6 ft 8 in)	110 kg (240 lb)	335 cm (11 ft 0 in)	345 cm (11 ft 4 in)	(Thailand) Nakhon Ratchasima
16	Kantapat Koonmee	17 April 1998	2.04 m (6 ft 8 in)	81 kg (179 lb)	345 cm (11 ft 4 in)	355 cm (11 ft 8 in)	(Thailand) Air Force
17	Boonyarid Wongtorn	29 January 1998	1.82 m (6 ft 0 in)	73 kg (161 lb)	310 cm (10 ft 2 in)	300 cm (9 ft 10 in)	(Thailand) Nakhon Ratchasima
18	Montri Puanglib	24 March 1990	1.67 m (5 ft 6 in)	70 kg (150 lb)	311 cm (10 ft 2 in)	281 cm (9 ft 3 in)	(Thailand) Ratchaburi
19	Piyarat Toontupthai	10 December 1987	1.72 m (5 ft 8 in)	72 kg (159 lb)	316 cm (10 ft 4 in)	308 cm (10 ft 1 in)	(Thailand) Air Force
20	Kissada Nilsawai	17 April 1992	2.02 m (6 ft 8 in)	87 kg (192 lb)	350 cm (11 ft 6 in)	335 cm (11 ft 0 in)	(Thailand) Air Force

=== China ===
The following is the Chinese roster in the 2016 AVC Cup for Men.

- Head coach: Li Mu

No.	Name	Date of birth	Height	Weight	Spike	Block	2016 club
1	Liu Libin	16 February 1995	1.98 m (6 ft 6 in)	90 kg (200 lb)	355 cm (11 ft 8 in)	345 cm (11 ft 4 in)	(China) Beijing
2	Jiang Chuan	9 August 1994	1.97 m (6 ft 6 in)	90 kg (200 lb)	355 cm (11 ft 8 in)	340 cm (11 ft 2 in)	(China) Beijing
3	Liu Meng	11 February 1995	1.95 m (6 ft 5 in)	80 kg (180 lb)	340 cm (11 ft 2 in)	330 cm (10 ft 10 in)	(China) Shandong
5	Li Yuanbo	27 September 1995	2.00 m (6 ft 7 in)	75 kg (165 lb)	359 cm (11 ft 9 in)	352 cm (11 ft 7 in)	(China) Henan
7	Li Bohan	5 May 1994	1.99 m (6 ft 6 in)	72 kg (159 lb)	340 cm (11 ft 2 in)	330 cm (10 ft 10 in)	(China) Shandong
8	Xia Runtao	18 October 1995	1.91 m (6 ft 3 in)	85 kg (187 lb)	345 cm (11 ft 4 in)	340 cm (11 ft 2 in)	(China) Hebei
9	Miao Ruantong	21 May 1995	2.00 m (6 ft 7 in)	85 kg (187 lb)	365 cm (12 ft 0 in)	355 cm (11 ft 8 in)	(China) Hebei
10	Chen Jiajie	17 September 1995	1.70 m (5 ft 7 in)	70 kg (150 lb)	325 cm (10 ft 8 in)	310 cm (10 ft 2 in)	(China) Guangdong
12	Rao Shuhan	23 December 1996	2.05 m (6 ft 9 in)	85 kg (187 lb)	340 cm (11 ft 2 in)	330 cm (10 ft 10 in)	(China) Fujian
13	Mao Tianyi (C)	2 June 1993	2.00 m (6 ft 7 in)	84 kg (185 lb)	350 cm (11 ft 6 in)	333 cm (10 ft 11 in)	(China) Army
15	Ji Daoshuai	7 February 1992	1.95 m (6 ft 5 in)	85 kg (187 lb)	355 cm (11 ft 8 in)	335 cm (11 ft 0 in)	(China) Shandong
17	Ke Junhuang	28 June 1994	1.83 m (6 ft 0 in)	70 kg (150 lb)	330 cm (10 ft 10 in)	320 cm (10 ft 6 in)	(China) Fujian
18	Liu Xiangdong	23 February 1993	1.97 m (6 ft 6 in)	85 kg (187 lb)	340 cm (11 ft 2 in)	330 cm (10 ft 10 in)	(China) Jiangsu
19	Tang Chuanhang	4 October 1995	2.00 m (6 ft 7 in)	81 kg (179 lb)	347 cm (11 ft 5 in)	330 cm (10 ft 10 in)	(China) Army

=== Kazakhstan ===
The following is the Kazakhstani roster in the 2016 AVC Cup for Men.

- Head coach: Igor Nikolchenko

No.	Name	Date of birth	2016 club
1	Roman Fartov	2 December 1992	(Kazakhstan) Pavlodar
2	Anton Kuznetsov	25 September 1989	(Kazakhstan) Almaty
3	Dmitry Vovnenko	17 April 1987	(Kazakhstan) Pavlodar
4	Alexandr Stolnikov (C)	17 July 1988	(Kazakhstan) TNK-Kazchrome
7	Vassiliy Donets	10 July 1988	(Kazakhstan) Almaty
8	Kanat Gabdulin	4 March 1985	(Kazakhstan) Almaty
9	Vitaliy Mironenko	18 May 1995	(Kazakhstan) Pavlodar
10	Maxim Michshenko	10 September 1990	(Kazakhstan) Almaty
11	Damir Akimov	22 September 1991	(Kazakhstan) Almaty
12	Nodirkhan Kadirkhanov	6 September 1991	(Kazakhstan) Almaty
14	Sergey Kostiv	25 January 1997	(Kazakhstan) Essil
16	Mirlan Badashev	5 August 1989	(Kazakhstan) Almaty
18	Vitaliy Vorivodin	31 July 1990	(Kazakhstan) Almaty
19	Maxim Mamedov	19 July 1987	(Kazakhstan) TNK-Kazchrome

=== Chinese Taipei ===
The following is the Taiwanese roster in the 2016 AVC Cup for Men.

- Head coach: Chen Ke-chou

No.	Name	Date of birth	2016 club
2	Liu Hong-jie	10 November 1993	Chinese Taipei
4	Tai Ju-chien	14 November 1988	Chinese Taipei
5	Tung Li-yi	10 October 1994	Chinese Taipei
7	Liu Hung-min	10 November 1993	Chinese Taipei
8	Chang Liang-hao	7 July 1994	Chinese Taipei
9	Chiang Tien-yu	7 February 1988	Chinese Taipei
10	Wu Tsung-hsuan	9 July 1994	Chinese Taipei
11	Huang Chien-feng	3 December 1990	Chinese Taipei
12	Hsu Mei-chung	16 October 1991	Chinese Taipei
14	Wang Ming-chun	30 July 1988	Chinese Taipei
17	Huang Pei-hung	17 September 1990	Chinese Taipei
19	Chen Chien-chen (C)	20 November 1989	Chinese Taipei

== Pool B ==
=== Japan ===
The following is the Japanese roster in the 2016 AVC Cup for Men.

- Head coach: Shingo Sakai

No.	Name	Date of birth	Height	Weight	Spike	Block	2016 club
1	Tsubasa Hisahara (C)	18 March 1995	1.88 m (6 ft 2 in)	77 kg (170 lb)	337 cm (11 ft 1 in)	320 cm (10 ft 6 in)	(Japan) Tokai University
2	Keisuke Sakai	25 August 1996	1.86 m (6 ft 1 in)	70 kg (150 lb)	325 cm (10 ft 8 in)	305 cm (10 ft 0 in)	(Japan) University of Tsukuba
3	Shohei Yamaguchi	21 July 1994	1.74 m (5 ft 9 in)	66 kg (146 lb)	317 cm (10 ft 5 in)	305 cm (10 ft 0 in)	(Japan) Waseda University
4	Yuki Suzuki	29 May 1997	2.01 m (6 ft 7 in)	80 kg (180 lb)	343 cm (11 ft 3 in)	315 cm (10 ft 4 in)	(Japan) Tokai University
5	Yasunari Kodama	24 July 1994	1.95 m (6 ft 5 in)	90 kg (200 lb)	340 cm (11 ft 2 in)	320 cm (10 ft 6 in)	(Japan) University of Tsukuba
6	Hisanori Kato	7 April 1994	1.94 m (6 ft 4 in)	85 kg (187 lb)	345 cm (11 ft 4 in)	325 cm (10 ft 8 in)	(Japan) Waseda University
7	Tomohiro Yamamoto	5 November 1994	1.71 m (5 ft 7 in)	60 kg (130 lb)	290 cm (9 ft 6 in)	280 cm (9 ft 2 in)	(Japan) Nippon Sport Science University
10	Yuki Koike	4 April 1995	1.91 m (6 ft 3 in)	86 kg (190 lb)	331 cm (10 ft 10 in)	316 cm (10 ft 4 in)	(Japan) University of Tsukuba
11	Yūki Ishikawa	11 December 1995	1.91 m (6 ft 3 in)	74 kg (163 lb)	345 cm (11 ft 4 in)	330 cm (10 ft 10 in)	(Japan) Chuo University
12	Yuhi Kamiya	20 November 1995	1.91 m (6 ft 3 in)	75 kg (165 lb)	340 cm (11 ft 2 in)	325 cm (10 ft 8 in)	(Japan) Tokai University
15	Taishi Onodera	27 February 1996	2.01 m (6 ft 7 in)	97 kg (214 lb)	340 cm (11 ft 2 in)	320 cm (10 ft 6 in)	(Japan) Tokai University
16	Issei Otake	3 December 1995	2.02 m (6 ft 8 in)	100 kg (220 lb)	340 cm (11 ft 2 in)	330 cm (10 ft 10 in)	(Japan) Chuo University
17	Yuki Higuchi	27 April 1996	1.91 m (6 ft 3 in)	74 kg (163 lb)	337 cm (11 ft 1 in)	315 cm (10 ft 4 in)	(Japan) University of Tsukuba
18	Kenta Takanashi	25 March 1997	1.90 m (6 ft 3 in)	77 kg (170 lb)	333 cm (10 ft 11 in)	312 cm (10 ft 3 in)	(Japan) Nippon Sport Science University

=== Iran ===
The following is the Iranian roster in the 2016 AVC Cup for Men.

- Head coach: Nasser Shahnazi

No.	Name	Date of birth	Height	Weight	Spike	Block	2016 club
2	Amin Esmaeilnejad	17 December 1996	2.03 m (6 ft 8 in)	95 kg (209 lb)	340 cm (11 ft 2 in)	335 cm (11 ft 0 in)	Iran
3	Saman Faezi	23 August 1991	2.05 m (6 ft 9 in)	98 kg (216 lb)	340 cm (11 ft 2 in)	335 cm (11 ft 0 in)	Iran
5	Mohammad Fallah	3 March 1993	2.01 m (6 ft 7 in)	99 kg (218 lb)	340 cm (11 ft 2 in)	355 cm (11 ft 8 in)	Iran
6	Ali Shafiei	21 September 1991	1.98 m (6 ft 6 in)	90 kg (200 lb)	335 cm (11 ft 0 in)	335 cm (11 ft 0 in)	Iran
8	Babak Amiri	23 September 1992	1.96 m (6 ft 5 in)	92 kg (203 lb)	336 cm (11 ft 0 in)	330 cm (10 ft 10 in)	Iran
9	Masoud Gholami	2 April 1990	2.01 m (6 ft 7 in)	100 kg (220 lb)	335 cm (11 ft 0 in)	335 cm (11 ft 0 in)	Iran
10	Alireza Mobasheri	10 June 1986	1.90 m (6 ft 3 in)	88 kg (194 lb)	345 cm (11 ft 4 in)	320 cm (10 ft 6 in)	Iran
11	Rahman Davoudi	18 February 1988	1.96 m (6 ft 5 in)	90 kg (200 lb)	330 cm (10 ft 10 in)	330 cm (10 ft 10 in)	Iran
13	Alireza Behboudi (C)	10 March 1979	1.95 m (6 ft 5 in)	92 kg (203 lb)	330 cm (10 ft 10 in)	330 cm (10 ft 10 in)	Iran
15	Mohammad Reza Moazzen	20 September 1991	1.80 m (5 ft 11 in)	70 kg (150 lb)	0 cm (0 in)	0 cm (0 in)	Iran
16	Mostafa Heidari	14 December 1991	1.78 m (5 ft 10 in)	70 kg (150 lb)	0 cm (0 in)	0 cm (0 in)	Iran
17	Reza Ghara	31 July 1991	2.00 m (6 ft 7 in)	95 kg (209 lb)	345 cm (11 ft 4 in)	335 cm (11 ft 0 in)	Iran
18	Mohammad Taher Vadi	10 October 1989	1.93 m (6 ft 4 in)	85 kg (187 lb)	330 cm (10 ft 10 in)	325 cm (10 ft 8 in)	Iran
19	Salim Cheperli	19 December 1996	2.00 m (6 ft 7 in)	93 kg (205 lb)	246 cm (8 ft 1 in)	240 cm (7 ft 10 in)	Iran

=== Australia ===
The following is the Australian roster in the 2016 AVC Cup for Men.

Head Coach: Roberto Santilli

No.	Name	Date of birth	Height	Weight	Spike	Block	2016 club
3	Elliott Viles	1 May 1997	1.93 m (6 ft 4 in)	73 kg (161 lb)	360 cm (11 ft 10 in)	340 cm (11 ft 2 in)	(Australia) VA AIS Centre of Excellence
12	Lewis Kehl	5 March 1999	2.05 m (6 ft 9 in)	80 kg (180 lb)	343 cm (11 ft 3 in)	330 cm (10 ft 10 in)	(Australia) VA AIS Centre of Excellence
14	Simon Hone	24 April 1993	1.99 m (6 ft 6 in)	96 kg (212 lb)	344 cm (11 ft 3 in)	337 cm (11 ft 1 in)	(Australia) VA AIS Centre of Excellence
15	James Takken	25 June 2000	1.93 m (6 ft 4 in)	78 kg (172 lb)	342 cm (11 ft 3 in)	337 cm (11 ft 1 in)	(Australia) VA AIS Centre of Excellence
16	Max Senica	19 August 1999	1.90 m (6 ft 3 in)	77 kg (170 lb)	339 cm (11 ft 1 in)	326 cm (10 ft 8 in)	(Australia) VA AIS Centre of Excellence
17	Jordan Richards	25 September 1993	1.97 m (6 ft 6 in)	83 kg (183 lb)	358 cm (11 ft 9 in)	345 cm (11 ft 4 in)	(Australia) TV Schonenwerd
18	Malachi Murch	4 January 1995	1.93 m (6 ft 4 in)	80 kg (180 lb)	342 cm (11 ft 3 in)	331 cm (10 ft 10 in)	(Australia) VA AIS Centre of Excellence
21	Arshdeep Dosanjh	30 July 1996	2.04 m (6 ft 8 in)	87 kg (192 lb)	248 cm (8 ft 2 in)	339 cm (11 ft 1 in)	(Australia) Team Lakkapaa
22	Trent O'Dea	11 May 1994	2.03 m (6 ft 8 in)	100 kg (220 lb)	354 cm (11 ft 7 in)	342 cm (11 ft 3 in)	(Australia) Team Lakkapaa
23	Mitchell Tulley	15 October 1996	2.05 m (6 ft 9 in)	92 kg (203 lb)	254 cm (8 ft 4 in)	243 cm (8 ft 0 in)	(Australia) VA AIS Centre of Excellence
24	Thomas Hodges (C)	4 July 1994	1.97 m (6 ft 6 in)	95 kg (209 lb)	350 cm (11 ft 6 in)	338 cm (11 ft 1 in)	(Australia) UC Irvine
25	Jordan Colotti	6 May 1996	1.88 m (6 ft 2 in)	76 kg (168 lb)	328 cm (10 ft 9 in)	319 cm (10 ft 6 in)	(Australia) VA AIS Centre of Excellence

=== South Korea ===
The following is the Korean roster in the 2016 AVC Cup for Men.

- Head coach: Kim Nam-sung

No.	Name	Date of birth	2016 club
3	Lee Sang-uk	8 July 1995	(South Korea) Sungkyunkwan University
4	Cha Ji-hwan	9 May 1996	(South Korea) Inha University
5	Son Ju-hyeong	29 July 1994	(South Korea) Kyunghee University
6	Lee Seung-won (C)	11 April 1993	(South Korea) Hyundai Capital Skywalkers
8	Han Sung-jeong	25 July 1996	(South Korea) Hongik University
10	Kim In-hyeok	14 July 1995	(South Korea) Gyeongnam National University of Science and Technology
11	Jo Jae-sung	1 August 1995	(South Korea) Kyunghee University
12	Hwang Kyung-min	10 April 1996	(South Korea) Kyonggi University
13	Hwang Taek-eui	12 November 1996	(South Korea) Sungkyunkwan University
15	Im Dong-hyeok	9 March 1999	(South Korea) Jecheon Industrial High School
18	Jung Jun-heuk	6 July 1993	(South Korea) Sungkyunkwan University
19	Kim Jae-hwi	6 September 1993	(South Korea) Hyundai Capital Skywalkers
