= 2005 FIVB Volleyball Men's World Grand Champions Cup squads =

This article shows all participating team squads at the 2005 FIVB Volleyball Men's World Grand Champions Cup.

== Brazil ==
The following is the Brazil roster in the 2005 FIVB Volleyball Men's World Grand Champions Cup.

#	Name	Date of Birth	Height	Weight	Spike	Block	Club
2	Marcelo Elgarten	9 November 1974	183 cm (6 ft 0 in)	78 kg (172 lb)	321 cm (126 in)	308 cm (121 in)	Panathinaikos Athens
4	André Heller	17 December 1975	199 cm (6 ft 6 in)	93 kg (205 lb)	339 cm (133 in)	321 cm (126 in)	Trentino Volley
7	Gilberto Godoy Filho	23 December 1976	192 cm (6 ft 4 in)	85 kg (187 lb)	325 cm (128 in)	312 cm (123 in)	Piemonte Volley
8	Murilo Endres	3 May 1981	190 cm (6 ft 3 in)	76 kg (168 lb)	343 cm (135 in)	319 cm (126 in)	Volley Callipo
9	André Nascimento	4 March 1979	195 cm (6 ft 5 in)	95 kg (209 lb)	340 cm (130 in)	320 cm (130 in)	Trentino Volley
10	Sérgio Dutra Santos	15 October 1975	184 cm (6 ft 0 in)	78 kg (172 lb)	325 cm (128 in)	310 cm (120 in)	Volley Piacenza
11	Anderson Rodrigues	21 May 1974	190 cm (6 ft 3 in)	95 kg (209 lb)	330 cm (130 in)	321 cm (126 in)	Piemonte Volley
12	Samuel Fuchs	4 March 1984	200 cm (6 ft 7 in)	89 kg (196 lb)	342 cm (135 in)	316 cm (124 in)	Minas Tênis Clube
13	Gustavo Endres	23 August 1975	203 cm (6 ft 8 in)	98 kg (216 lb)	337 cm (133 in)	325 cm (128 in)	Volley Treviso
14	Rodrigo Santana	17 April 1979	205 cm (6 ft 9 in)	85 kg (187 lb)	350 cm (140 in)	328 cm (129 in)	Lube Volley
16	Wesley Ribeiro	24 April 1979	190 cm (6 ft 3 in)	82 kg (181 lb)	335 cm (132 in)	319 cm (126 in)	E.C. Pinheiros
17	Ricardo Garcia	19 November 1975	191 cm (6 ft 3 in)	89 kg (196 lb)	337 cm (133 in)	320 cm (130 in)	Modena Volley

== China ==
The following is the China roster in the 2005 FIVB Volleyball Men's World Grand Champions Cup.

#	Name	Date of Birth	Height	Weight	Spike	Block	Club
4	Zhi Yuan	29 September 1981	95 cm (3 ft 1 in)	194 kg (428 lb)	348 cm (11 ft 5 in)	334 cm (10 ft 11 in)	Liaoning
5	Peng Guo	1 July 1982	84 cm (2 ft 9 in)	200 kg (440 lb)	360 cm (11 ft 10 in)	337 cm (11 ft 1 in)	Army
7	Miao Tang	4 May 1982	85 cm (2 ft 9 in)	204 kg (450 lb)	355 cm (11 ft 8 in)	345 cm (11 ft 4 in)	Shanghai
9	Jiong He	16 February 1977	76 cm (2 ft 6 in)	188 kg (414 lb)	342 cm (11 ft 3 in)	332 cm (10 ft 11 in)	Shanghai
10	Chun Li	1 April 1982	82 cm (2 ft 8 in)	190 kg (420 lb)	348 cm (11 ft 5 in)	332 cm (10 ft 11 in)	Army
12	Qiong Shen	5 September 1981	84 cm (2 ft 9 in)	198 kg (437 lb)	359 cm (11 ft 9 in)	349 cm (11 ft 5 in)	Shanghai
13	Yingchao Fang	3 August 1982	79 cm (2 ft 7 in)	198 kg (437 lb)	360 cm (11 ft 10 in)	350 cm (11 ft 6 in)	Shanghai
15	Hui Chu	11 February 1981	70 cm (2 ft 4 in)	187 kg (412 lb)	355 cm (11 ft 8 in)	323 cm (10 ft 7 in)	Beijing
17	Shengsheng Sui	30 May 1980	75 cm (2 ft 6 in)	192 kg (423 lb)	345 cm (11 ft 4 in)	334 cm (10 ft 11 in)	Liaoning
18	Dawei Yu	21 June 1984	90 cm (2 ft 11 in)	199 kg (439 lb)	345 cm (11 ft 4 in)	335 cm (11 ft 0 in)	Shandong

== Japan ==
The following is the Japan roster in the 2005 FIVB Volleyball Men's World Grand Champions Cup.

#	Name	Date of Birth	Height	Weight	Spike	Block	Club
5	Hiroyuki Kai	17 July 1978	89 cm (2 ft 11 in)	189 kg (417 lb)	330 cm (10 ft 10 in)	320 cm (10 ft 6 in)	Toyoda Gosei Trefuerza
6	Kazuma Kishimoto	27 July 1979	74 cm (2 ft 5 in)	195 kg (430 lb)	341 cm (11 ft 2 in)	326 cm (10 ft 8 in)	Panasonic Panthers
8	Masaji Ogino	8 January 1970	98 cm (3 ft 3 in)	197 kg (434 lb)	340 cm (11 ft 2 in)	320 cm (10 ft 6 in)	Suntory Sunbirds
10	Katsuyuki Minami	30 September 1970	83 cm (2 ft 9 in)	200 kg (440 lb)	345 cm (11 ft 4 in)	330 cm (10 ft 10 in)	Asahi Kasei
12	Kota Yamamura	20 October 1980	95 cm (3 ft 1 in)	205 kg (452 lb)	350 cm (11 ft 6 in)	335 cm (11 ft 0 in)	Suntory Sunbirds
13	Rio Matsunaga	9 October 1981	80 cm (2 ft 7 in)	190 kg (420 lb)	345 cm (11 ft 4 in)	315 cm (10 ft 4 in)	Panasonic Panthers
14	Kyohei Shibata	24 June 1981	81 cm (2 ft 8 in)	190 kg (420 lb)	355 cm (11 ft 8 in)	320 cm (10 ft 6 in)	Toray Arrows
15	Katsutoshi Tsumagari	2 November 1975	78 cm (2 ft 7 in)	183 kg (403 lb)	320 cm (10 ft 6 in)	305 cm (10 ft 0 in)	Suntory Sunbirds
17	Yu Koshikawa	30 June 1984	87 cm (2 ft 10 in)	189 kg (417 lb)	340 cm (11 ft 2 in)	320 cm (10 ft 6 in)	JT Thunders
18	Kosuke Tomonaga	22 July 1980	83 cm (2 ft 9 in)	184 kg (406 lb)	320 cm (10 ft 6 in)	310 cm (10 ft 2 in)	Sakai Blazers

== Egypt ==
The following is the Egypt roster in the 2005 FIVB Volleyball Men's World Grand Champions Cup.

#	Name	Date of Birth	Height	Weight	Spike	Block	Club
1	Hamdy Awad	14 April 1972	105 cm (3 ft 5 in)	202 kg (445 lb)	346 cm (11 ft 4 in)	327 cm (10 ft 9 in)	AHLY
2	Abdallah Bekhit	10 October 1983	72 cm (2 ft 4 in)	198 kg (437 lb)	352 cm (11 ft 7 in)	331 cm (10 ft 10 in)	AHLY
4	Ahmed Abdelhay	19 August 1984	87 cm (2 ft 10 in)	197 kg (434 lb)	342 cm (11 ft 3 in)	316 cm (10 ft 4 in)	ARMY CLUB
5	Ossama Bekheit	12 January 1977	72 cm (2 ft 4 in)	192 kg (423 lb)	335 cm (11 ft 0 in)	326 cm (10 ft 8 in)	AHLY
6	Wael Alaydy	8 December 1971	78 cm (2 ft 7 in)	178 kg (392 lb)	320 cm (10 ft 6 in)	300 cm (9 ft 10 in)	ZAMALEK
8	Saleh Youssef	25 July 1982	91 cm (3 ft 0 in)	194 kg (428 lb)	345 cm (11 ft 4 in)	332 cm (10 ft 11 in)	Zamalek
9	Mohamed El Mahdy	2 September 1978	96 cm (3 ft 2 in)	196 kg (432 lb)	340 cm (11 ft 2 in)	335 cm (11 ft 0 in)	AHLY
10	Mahmoud Elkoumy	19 October 1983	80 cm (2 ft 7 in)	196 kg (432 lb)	330 cm (10 ft 10 in)	326 cm (10 ft 8 in)	AHLY
11	Mohamed Elnafrawy	9 June 1983	92 cm (3 ft 0 in)	200 kg (440 lb)	335 cm (11 ft 0 in)	320 cm (10 ft 6 in)	AHLY
13	Mohamed Badawy	11 January 1986	97 cm (3 ft 2 in)	197 kg (434 lb)	351 cm (11 ft 6 in)	343 cm (11 ft 3 in)	ZAMALEK
14	Mohamed El Daabousi	1 March 1987	107 cm (3 ft 6 in)	202 kg (445 lb)	348 cm (11 ft 5 in)	342 cm (11 ft 3 in)	ZAMALEK
18	Hossameldin Gomaa	15 February 1984	92 cm (3 ft 0 in)	199 kg (439 lb)	344 cm (11 ft 3 in)	324 cm (10 ft 8 in)	AHLY

== Italy ==
The following is the Italy roster in the 2005 FIVB Volleyball Men's World Grand Champions Cup.

#	Name	Date of Birth	Height	Weight	Spike	Block	Club
1	Luigi Mastrangelo	17 August 1975	90 cm (2 ft 11 in)	202 kg (445 lb)	368 cm (12 ft 1 in)	336 cm (11 ft 0 in)	Bre banca Lannuti Cuneo
3	Giacomo Sintini	16 January 1979	85 cm (2 ft 9 in)	196 kg (432 lb)	320 cm (10 ft 6 in)	305 cm (10 ft 0 in)	Trentino Volley
5	Valerio Vermiglio	1 March 1976	85 cm (2 ft 9 in)	193 kg (425 lb)	342 cm (11 ft 3 in)	320 cm (10 ft 6 in)	ZENIT Kazan
7	Alessandro Paparoni	17 August 1981	75 cm (2 ft 6 in)	191 kg (421 lb)	340 cm (11 ft 2 in)	314 cm (10 ft 4 in)	Lube Banca Marche
8	Alberto Cisolla	10 October 1977	86 cm (2 ft 10 in)	197 kg (434 lb)	367 cm (12 ft 0 in)	345 cm (11 ft 4 in)	Sisley
10	Luca Tencati	16 March 1979	97 cm (3 ft 2 in)	200 kg (440 lb)	350 cm (11 ft 6 in)	330 cm (10 ft 10 in)	Cimone
12	Mirko Corsano	28 October 1973	87 cm (2 ft 10 in)	190 kg (420 lb)	342 cm (11 ft 3 in)	303 cm (9 ft 11 in)	Lube Banca Marche
14	Alessandro Fei	29 November 1978	90 cm (2 ft 11 in)	204 kg (450 lb)	358 cm (11 ft 9 in)	336 cm (11 ft 0 in)	Copra Elior Piacenza
16	Michal Lasko	11 March 1981	104 cm (3 ft 5 in)	202 kg (445 lb)	348 cm (11 ft 5 in)	337 cm (11 ft 1 in)	Jastrzebski Wegel
18	Matej Cernic	13 September 1978	80 cm (2 ft 7 in)	192 kg (423 lb)	354 cm (11 ft 7 in)	335 cm (11 ft 0 in)	Assecco Resovia

== United States ==
The following is the United States roster in the 2005 FIVB Volleyball Men's World Grand Champions Cup.

#	Name	Date of Birth	Height	Weight	Spike	Block	Club
4	Christopher Tamas	27 January 1981	95 cm (3 ft 1 in)	195 kg (430 lb)	351 cm (11 ft 6 in)	332 cm (10 ft 11 in)	Reyal Voley Guadalajara
5	Richard Lambourne	6 May 1975	90 cm (2 ft 11 in)	190 kg (420 lb)	324 cm (10 ft 8 in)	312 cm (10 ft 3 in)	USA Men's Volleyball Team
6	Phillip Eatherton	2 January 1974	101 cm (3 ft 4 in)	206 kg (454 lb)	356 cm (11 ft 8 in)	335 cm (11 ft 0 in)	AZS Czestochowa
8	William Reid Priddy	1 October 1977	89 cm (2 ft 11 in)	194 kg (428 lb)	353 cm (11 ft 7 in)	330 cm (10 ft 10 in)	USA Men's Volleyball Team
9	Ryan Millar	22 January 1978	98 cm (3 ft 3 in)	204 kg (450 lb)	354 cm (11 ft 7 in)	326 cm (10 ft 8 in)	Lokomotiv Nobosibirsk
10	Riley Salmon	2 July 1976	89 cm (2 ft 11 in)	198 kg (437 lb)	345 cm (11 ft 4 in)	331 cm (10 ft 10 in)	Corozal Plataneros
12	Thomas Hoff	9 June 1973	94 cm (3 ft 1 in)	198 kg (437 lb)	353 cm (11 ft 7 in)	333 cm (10 ft 11 in)	USA Men's Volleyball Team
13	Clayton Stanley	20 January 1978	104 cm (3 ft 5 in)	205 kg (452 lb)	357 cm (11 ft 9 in)	332 cm (10 ft 11 in)	Ural UFA
16	David Mckienzie	5 July 1979	95 cm (3 ft 1 in)	193 kg (425 lb)	358 cm (11 ft 9 in)	340 cm (11 ft 2 in)	Kuwait Sporting Club
