= Volleyball at the 2006 Asian Games – Men's tournament =

Men at the 2006 Asian Games
- Venue: Al-Rayyan Indoor Hall
- Date: 26 November – 14 December 2006
- Competitors: 227 from 19 nations

Medalists
gold medal	South Korea
silver medal	China
bronze medal	Saudi Arabia

The 2006 Men's Asian Games Volleyball Tournament was the 13th edition of the event, organized by the Asian governing body, the AVC in conjunction with the OCA. It was held in Doha, Qatar from November 26 to December 14, 2006.

21 teams registered for the competition, Indonesia and Turkmenistan withdrew after the draw. Palestine also withdrew few days before the competition, but its results still counted.

== Squads ==
Bahrain	China	Chinese Taipei	Hong Kong
Fadhel Abbas; Ebrahim Nesaif; Hasan Dhahi; Emad Ali; Fuad Abdulwahed; Mahmood Hasan; Hasan Abdulrazaq; Sadeq Al-Mohsen; Jasim Al-Nabhan; Yunes Abdulkarim; Merza Abdulla; Ayman Haroona	Cui Xiaodong; Yuan Zhi; Guo Peng; Wang Haichuan; Tang Miao; Cui Jianjun; Li Chun; Yu Dawei; Shen Qiong; Jiang Fudong; Ren Qi; Sui Shengsheng	Chiang Tien-yu; Wang Ming-chun; Kan Ping-tsung; Hung Jung-chung; Lin Hsien-chen; Chen Yu-sheng; Chou Tsung-hao; Chien Wei-lun; Teng Cheng-wei; Huang Feng-sheng; Chang Shan-yuan; Chiu Te-chuan	Tse Kwok Kei; Eric Cheng; Lee Ka Ming; Jacky Kwong; Chau Po Hong; Ko Yiu Hung; Alan Chau; Man Ka Ho; Ma Sai Pun; Hui Pui Tak; Hui Po Lam; Yu Hing Lung
India	Iran	Japan	Kazakhstan
Yejju Subba Rao; Mandeep Singh; Siva Rajan; M. N. Vikram; Guttikonda Pradeep; K. J. Kapil Dev; Tom Joseph; Jitendra Singh; Raveendra Rajeev; Sanjay Kumar; Balwinder Singh; P. S. Srikanth	Amir Hossein Monazzami; Mohammad Shariati; Amir Hosseini; Davoud Moghbeli; Peyman Akbari; Mohammad Mansouri; Farhad Zarif; Alireza Nadi; Behnam Mahmoudi; Mohammad Torkashvand; Mohammad Soleimani; Mohammad Mohammadkazem	Nobuharu Saito; Shinya Chiba; Kenji Onoue; Ryuji Naohiro; Takahiro Yamamoto; Masaji Ogino; Kota Yamamura; Yuta Abe; Katsutoshi Tsumagari; Yusuke Ishijima; Yu Koshikawa; Kosuke Tomonaga	Yevgeniy Senatorov; Anton Yudin; Yevgeniy Andreyev; Dmitriy Gorbatkov; Sergey Trikoz; Marat Imangaliyev; Alexey Stepanov; Vladimir Derevyanko; Denis Zhukov; Anton Rubtsov; Svyatoslav Miklashevich; Kirill Konovalov
Kuwait	Lebanon	Macau	Maldives
Abdullah Jasem; Mousa Baharoh; Yousef Al-Qallaf; Sultan Khalaf; Amer Al-Salim; Jaber Qasem; Hussain Al-Shatti; Abdulrahman Al-Otaibi; Yousef Al-Buloushi; Abdulaziz Dashti; Faisal Al-Ajmi; Rashed Al-Rashoud	Alain Saade; Rony Daou; Chady Bou-Farhat; Marwan Hosri; Nader Fares; Pierre Fares; Elie El-Nar; Adam El-Kass; Firas El-Helou; Joseph Nohra; Elias Abi Chedid; Jean Abi Chedid	Lei Un Pio; Sérgio Zeferino; Too Wai Kei; Too Chuen Ki; Leong Hong Lek; Ngai Kam Hung; Lo Tak Wai; Leong Ka Ho; Choi Wai Kit; Lai Sai Tik; Cheong Ka Chon; Lei Weng Kei	Ismail Rifau; Mohamed Ranesh; Ishan Mohamed; Hussain Saeed; Mohamed Sajid; Mohamed Nihad; Ahmed Adheel; Ahmed Abdul Kareem; Ahmed Ali; Junaid Abdulla; Ashfag Adam; Sodiq Moosa
Mongolia	Palestine	Qatar	Saudi Arabia
Renchingiin Khangai; Renchingiin Tamir; Batsaikhany Möngöndöl; Yambasürengiin Enkhmagnai; Gankhuyagiin Batmönkh; Erdenebilegiin Batkhüü; Bayarbaataryn Gankhuyag; Enkhbaataryn Batbayar; Dembereliin Tserenbat; Gankhuyagiin Iderjargalan; Erdenebilegiin Sainbileg; Boldyn Tümenbat	Iyad Abu Al-Qumsan; Salim Abujaser; Ahmed Attaalah; Ramy Abu Hizima; Hany Hassuna; Abdallah Matar; Binyameen Taha; Khaled Al-Arqan; Mahmoud Maleeha; Raid Matar; Nassar Al-Bayik	Jumah Faraj; Mubarak Eid Al-Abdulla; Sulaiman Saeed; Mohammed Al-Beshri; Ismaeel Al-Sheeb; Ali Ishaq Bairami; Mohammed Amer; Nabeel Al-Safadi; Ali Hamid Yagoub; Mohammed Abuwatfa; Ibrahim Mohammed; Saeed Juma Al-Hitmi	Ahmed Al-Bakhit; Naif Al-Buhassoun; Yahya Hanash; Ibrahim Al-Harbi; Abdullah Al-Bahli; Sharif Al-Khalifa; Khalil Hajji; Thamer Al-Dossari; Khalid Ozaibi; Ismail Al-Khaibari; Masfer Al-Bishi; Yasser Al-Makawni
South Korea	Thailand	United Arab Emirates	
Shin Jin-sik; Kwon Young-min; Moon Sung-min; Yeo Oh-hyun; Song Byung-il; Lee Sun-kyu; Who In-jung; Yun Bong-woo; Lee Kyung-soo; Kim Yo-han; Ha Kyoung-min; Chang Byung-chul	Waroot Wisedsing; Wanchai Tabwises; Ronnarong Jarupeng; Annop Auttakornsiripho; Kittikun Sriutthawong; Supachai Sriphum; Pongsakorn Nimawan; Yuttana Kiewpekar; Sarayut Yutthayong; Songserm Prasertnu; Supachai Jitjumroon; Ratchapoom Samthong	Khalid Ahmed Hamza; Hani Hassan Al-Saayari; Saif Rashed Al-Ameri; Saleh Ibrahim Mahboob; Badr Ahmed Al-Mannaei; Walid Ahmed Al-Asli; Hassan Majed Belal; Mubarak Juma Khdoom; Mohamed Abdulla Fairooz; Saeed Obaid Bakhit; Rashed Ayoob Mohamed; Hassan Abbas Ibrahim	

== Results ==
All times are Arabia Standard Time (UTC+03:00)

Legend

- WO — Won by walkover

=== Qualification ===
==== Pool A ====
Pos	Team	Pld	W	L	Pts	SPW	SPL	SPR	SW	SL	SR	Qualification
1	Bahrain	2	2	0	4	171	137	1.248	6	1	6.000	Preliminary
2	Lebanon	2	1	1	3	188	164	1.146	4	4	1.000	Preliminary
3	Mongolia	2	0	2	2	115	173	0.665	1	6	0.167	

Source: Results

Date	Time		Score		Set 1	Set 2	Set 3	Set 4	Set 5	Total
26 Nov	12:00	Lebanon	3–1	Mongolia	25–16	23–25	25–11	25–16		98–68
27 Nov	18:00	Bahrain	3–1	Lebanon	25–23	25–22	21–25	25–20		96–90
28 Nov	18:00	Mongolia	0–3	Bahrain	16–25	15–25	16–25			47–75

==== Pool B ====
Pos	Team	Pld	W	L	Pts	SPW	SPL	SPR	SW	SL	SR	Qualification
1	Saudi Arabia	1	1	0	2	75	52	1.442	3	0	MAX	Preliminary
2	Macau	1	0	1	1	52	75	0.693	0	3	0.000	Preliminary

Source: Results

Date	Time		Score		Set 1	Set 2	Set 3	Set 4	Set 5	Total
26 Nov	14:00	Saudi Arabia	3–0	Macau	25–18	25–20	25–14			75–52

==== Pool C ====
Pos	Team	Pld	W	L	Pts	SPW	SPL	SPR	SW	SL	SR	Qualification
1	Chinese Taipei	2	2	0	4	175	80	2.188	6	1	6.000	Preliminary
2	Kuwait	2	1	1	3	155	161	0.963	4	3	1.333	Preliminary
3	Maldives	2	0	2	1	61	150	0.407	0	6	0.000	

Source: Results

Date	Time		Score		Set 1	Set 2	Set 3	Set 4	Set 5	Total
26 Nov	18:00	Kuwait	3–0	Maldives	25–22	25–17	25–22			75–61
27 Nov	12:00	Chinese Taipei	3–1	Kuwait	25–17	25–18	25–27	25–18		100–80
28 Nov	12:00	Maldives	0–3	Chinese Taipei (WO)	0–25	0–25	0–25			0–75

==== Pool D ====
Pos	Team	Pld	W	L	Pts	SPW	SPL	SPR	SW	SL	SR	Qualification
1	United Arab Emirates	2	2	0	4	153	70	2.186	6	0	MAX	Preliminary
2	Hong Kong	2	1	1	3	145	78	1.859	3	3	1.000	Preliminary
3	Palestine	2	0	2	0	0	150	0.000	0	6	0.000	

Source: Results

Date	Time		Score		Set 1	Set 2	Set 3	Set 4	Set 5	Total
26 Nov	20:00	(WO) Hong Kong	3–0	Palestine	25–0	25–0	25–0			75–0
27 Nov	14:00	United Arab Emirates	3–0	Hong Kong	28–26	25–22	25–22			78–70
28 Nov	14:00	Palestine	0–3	United Arab Emirates (WO)	0–25	0–25	0–25			0–75

=== Preliminary ===
==== Pool A ====
Pos	Team	Pld	W	L	Pts	SPW	SPL	SPR	SW	SL	SR	Qualification
1	Saudi Arabia	4	4	0	8	362	285	1.270	12	3	4.000	Quarterfinals
2	India	4	3	1	7	330	272	1.213	10	3	3.333	
3	Kuwait	4	1	3	5	338	352	0.960	7	9	0.778	
4	Lebanon	4	1	3	5	323	371	0.871	4	11	0.364	
5	United Arab Emirates	4	1	3	5	241	314	0.768	3	10	0.300	

Source: Results

Date	Time		Score		Set 1	Set 2	Set 3	Set 4	Set 5	Total
02 Dec	14:00	Lebanon	1–3	United Arab Emirates	25–18	23–25	18–25	23–25		89–93
02 Dec	18:00	Saudi Arabia	3–2	Kuwait	26–28	25–14	25–20	23–25	15–11	114–98
03 Dec	18:00	United Arab Emirates	0–3	Saudi Arabia	18–25	16–25	16–25			50–75
03 Dec	20:00	India	3–0	Lebanon	25–18	39–37	25–23			89–78
04 Dec	20:00	Saudi Arabia	3–1	India	25–21	25–22	23–25	25–23		98–91
05 Dec	14:00	Kuwait	3–0	United Arab Emirates	25–11	25–23	25–19			75–53
07 Dec	12:00	India	3–0	Kuwait	25–17	25–16	25–18			75–51
07 Dec	14:00	Lebanon	0–3	Saudi Arabia	15–25	16–25	15–25			46–75
09 Dec	12:00	Kuwait	2–3	Lebanon	27–29	25–22	25–18	24–26	13–15	114–110
09 Dec	14:00	United Arab Emirates	0–3	India	12–25	14–25	19–25			45–75

==== Pool B ====
Pos	Team	Pld	W	L	Pts	SPW	SPL	SPR	SW	SL	SR	Qualification
1	Bahrain	4	4	0	8	352	300	1.173	12	3	4.000	Quarterfinals
2	Chinese Taipei	4	3	1	7	330	249	1.325	11	3	3.667	
3	Thailand	4	2	2	6	288	269	1.071	7	6	1.167	
4	Hong Kong	4	1	3	5	220	285	0.772	3	9	0.333	
5	Macau	4	0	4	4	213	300	0.710	0	12	0.000	

Source: Results

Date	Time		Score		Set 1	Set 2	Set 3	Set 4	Set 5	Total
02 Dec	20:00	Bahrain	3–0	Hong Kong	25–11	25–15	25–19			75–45
03 Dec	14:00	Macau	0–3	Chinese Taipei	12–25	23–25	13–25			48–75
04 Dec	14:00	Hong Kong	3–0	Macau	25–23	25–18	25–19			75–60
04 Dec	18:00	Thailand	1–3	Bahrain	25–23	27–29	20–25	17–25		89–102
05 Dec	18:00	Macau	0–3	Thailand	16–25	17–25	11–25			44–75
05 Dec	20:00	Chinese Taipei	3–0	Hong Kong	25–15	25–18	25–19			75–52
07 Dec	18:00	Thailand	0–3	Chinese Taipei	15–25	13–25	21–25			49–75
07 Dec	20:00	Bahrain	3–0	Macau	25–17	25–22	25–22			75–61
09 Dec	18:00	Chinese Taipei	2–3	Bahrain	25–18	23–25	25–17	19–25	13–15	105–100
09 Dec	20:00	Hong Kong	0–3	Thailand	17–25	20–25	11–25			48–75

=== Final round ===
Quarterfinals
11 December
Japan	0
Saudi Arabia	3
11 December
China	3
Kazakhstan	1
11 December
Qatar	3
Bahrain	0
11 December
South Korea	3
Iran	1

Semifinals
13 December
Saudi Arabia	2
China	3
13 December
Qatar	1
South Korea	3

Gold medal match
14 December
China	1
South Korea	3
Bronze medal match
14 December
Saudi Arabia	3
Qatar	2

Pos 5–8
13 December
Japan	3
Kazakhstan	0
13 December
Bahrain	1
Iran	3

Pos 5–6
14 December
Japan	3
Iran	2
Pos 7–8
14 December
Kazakhstan	3
Bahrain	1

==== Quarterfinals ====
Date	Time		Score		Set 1	Set 2	Set 3	Set 4	Set 5	Total
11 Dec	12:00	China	3–1	Kazakhstan	25–21	25–20	24–26	25–20		99–87
11 Dec	14:00	South Korea	3–1	Iran	25–23	23–25	25–15	25–18		98–81
11 Dec	18:00	Japan	0–3	Saudi Arabia	20–25	25–27	21–25			66–77
11 Dec	20:00	Qatar	3–0	Bahrain	25–23	25–16	25–18			75–57

==== Pos 5–8 ====
Date	Time		Score		Set 1	Set 2	Set 3	Set 4	Set 5	Total
13 Dec	12:00	Japan	3–0	Kazakhstan	25–14	25–23	25–23			75–60
13 Dec	18:00	Bahrain	1–3	Iran	19–25	25–23	23–25	20–25		87–98

==== Semifinals ====
Date	Time		Score		Set 1	Set 2	Set 3	Set 4	Set 5	Total
13 Dec	14:00	Saudi Arabia	2–3	China	20–25	11–25	25–23	25–22	13–15	94–110
13 Dec	20:00	Qatar	1–3	South Korea	27–25	21–25	22–25	16–25		86–100

==== Pos 7–8 ====
Date	Time		Score		Set 1	Set 2	Set 3	Set 4	Set 5	Total
14 Dec	12:00	Kazakhstan	3–1	Bahrain	25–21	23–25	25–21	25–18		98–85

==== Pos 5–6 ====
Date	Time		Score		Set 1	Set 2	Set 3	Set 4	Set 5	Total
14 Dec	14:00	Japan	3–2	Iran	25–23	23–25	25–27	25–22	15–9	113–106

==== Bronze medal match ====
Date	Time		Score		Set 1	Set 2	Set 3	Set 4	Set 5	Total
14 Dec	18:00	Saudi Arabia	3–2	Qatar	25–20	16–25	25–21	17–25	15–11	98–102

==== Gold medal match ====
Date	Time		Score		Set 1	Set 2	Set 3	Set 4	Set 5	Total
14 Dec	20:00	China	1–3	South Korea	18–25	25–22	18–25	16–25		77–97

== Final standing ==
Rank	Team	Pld	W	L
1st place, gold medalist(s)	South Korea	3	3	0
2nd place, silver medalist(s)	China	3	2	1
3rd place, bronze medalist(s)	Saudi Arabia	8	7	1
4	Qatar	3	1	2
5	Japan	3	2	1
6	Iran	3	1	2
7	Kazakhstan	3	1	2
8	Bahrain	9	6	3
9	Chinese Taipei	6	5	1
9	India	4	3	1
11	Kuwait	6	2	4
11	Thailand	4	2	2
13	Hong Kong	6	2	4
13	Lebanon	6	2	4
15	Macau	5	0	5
15	United Arab Emirates	6	3	3
17	Maldives	2	0	2
17	Mongolia	2	0	2
17	Palestine	2	0	2
