= 2012 AVC Cup for Men =

International indoor volleyball tournament

2012 Asian Men's Volleyball Cup

Tournament details
- Host country: Vietnam
- City: Vĩnh Phúc
- Dates: 1–7 September
- Teams: 8 (from 1 confederation)
- Venue: 1 (in 1 host city)

Final positions
- Champions: China (1st title)
- Runners-up: Iran
- Third place: Japan
- Fourth place: India

Tournament awards
- MVP: (China) Zhan Guojun

The 2012 Asian Men's Volleyball Cup, so-called 2012 AVC Cup for Men was the third edition of the Asian Cup, played by top eight teams of the 2011 Asian Championship. The tournament was held at Vinh Yen Gymnasium, Vĩnh Phúc, Vietnam from 1 to 7 September 2012.

== Pools composition ==
The teams are seeded based on their final ranking at the 2011 Asian Men's Volleyball Championship.

Pool A	Pool B
Vietnam (Host); South Korea (3rd); Japan; ~~Pakistan~~ *	Iran (1st); China (2nd); Australia; India

* Pakistan withdrew and replaced by Myanmar.

== Venue ==
All matches
Vĩnh Yên, Vietnam
Vĩnh Yên Gymnasium
Capacity: Unknown

== Preliminary round ==
=== Pool A ===
Pos	Team	Pld	W	L	Pts	SW	SL	SR	SPW	SPL	SPR	Qualification
1	Japan	3	3	0	9	9	0	MAX	225	179	1.257	Quarterfinals
2	South Korea	3	2	1	6	6	4	1.500	246	233	1.056	Quarterfinals
3	Vietnam	3	1	2	3	3	6	0.500	204	204	1.000	Quarterfinals
4	Myanmar	3	0	3	0	1	9	0.111	191	250	0.764	Quarterfinals

Date	Time		Score		Set 1	Set 2	Set 3	Set 4	Set 5	Total	Report
01 Sep	19:30	Myanmar	0–3	Vietnam	15–25	18–25	15–25			48–75	Report
01 Sep	21:00	South Korea	0–3	Japan	20–25	22–25	23–25			65–75	Report
02 Sep	18:00	Myanmar	1–3	South Korea	27–25	23–25	20–25	21–25		91–100	Report
02 Sep	20:00	Vietnam	0–3	Japan	23–25	19–25	20–25			62–75	Report
03 Sep	18:00	South Korea	3–0	Vietnam	25–21	25–17	31–29			81–67	Report
03 Sep	20:00	Japan	3–0	Myanmar	25–18	25–19	25–15			75–52	Report

=== Pool B ===
Pos	Team	Pld	W	L	Pts	SW	SL	SR	SPW	SPL	SPR	Qualification
1	Iran	3	3	0	8	9	4	2.250	313	279	1.122	Quarterfinals
2	China	3	2	1	7	8	4	2.000	276	247	1.117	Quarterfinals
3	India	3	1	2	3	5	6	0.833	251	266	0.944	Quarterfinals
4	Australia	3	0	3	0	1	9	0.111	203	251	0.809	Quarterfinals

Date	Time		Score		Set 1	Set 2	Set 3	Set 4	Set 5	Total	Report
01 Sep	14:00	Iran	3–2	China	25–21	22–25	22–25	25–19	15–11	109–101	Report
01 Sep	16:00	India	3–0	Australia	25–18	25–22	25–23			75–63	Report
02 Sep	14:00	Iran	3–1	India	26–24	27–29	27–25	25–22		105–100	Report
02 Sep	16:00	China	3–0	Australia	27–25	25–15	25–22			77–62	Report
03 Sep	14:00	India	1–3	China	17–25	25–23	17–25	17–25		76–98	Report
03 Sep	16:00	Australia	1–3	Iran	18–25	26–24	18–25	16–25		78–99	Report

== Final round ==
Quarterfinals
5 September
Iran	3
Myanmar	0
5 September
South Korea	2
India	3
5 September
Japan	3
Australia	0
5 September
China	3
Vietnam	0

Semifinals
6 September
Iran	3
India	0
6 September
Japan	0
China	3

Final
7 September
Iran	1
China	3
3rd place
7 September
India	1
Japan	3

5th–8th places
6 September
Myanmar	0
South Korea	3
6 September
Australia	1
Vietnam	3

5th place
7 September
South Korea	3
Vietnam	0
7th place
7 September
Myanmar	0
Australia	3

=== Quarterfinals ===
Date	Time		Score		Set 1	Set 2	Set 3	Set 4	Set 5	Total	Report
05 Sep	14:00	South Korea	2–3	India	25–27	25–14	20–25	25–23	15–17	110–106	
05 Sep	16:00	Japan	3–0	Australia	25–17	30–28	25–20			80–65	
05 Sep	18:00	Iran	3–0	Myanmar	25–17	25–9	25–12			75–38	
05 Sep	20:00	China	3–0	Vietnam	25–17	25–7	25–9			75–33	

=== 5th–8th semifinals ===
Date	Time		Score		Set 1	Set 2	Set 3	Set 4	Set 5	Total	Report
06 Sep	14:00	Myanmar	0–3	South Korea	19–25	12–25	13–25			44–75	Report
06 Sep	16:00	Australia	1–3	Vietnam	23–25	25–21	21–25	21–25		90–96	Report

=== Semifinals ===
Date	Time		Score		Set 1	Set 2	Set 3	Set 4	Set 5	Total	Report
06 Sep	18:00	Japan	0–3	China	20–25	22–25	22–25			64–75	Report
06 Sep	20:00	Iran	3–0	India	25–23	25–13	25–23			75–59	Report

=== 7th place ===
Date	Time		Score		Set 1	Set 2	Set 3	Set 4	Set 5	Total	Report
07 Sep	14:00	Myanmar	0–3	Australia	22–25	21–25	17–25			60–75	

=== 5th place ===
Date	Time		Score		Set 1	Set 2	Set 3	Set 4	Set 5	Total	Report
07 Sep	16:00	South Korea	3–0	Vietnam	25–22	25–18	25–19			75–59	

=== 3rd place ===
Date	Time		Score		Set 1	Set 2	Set 3	Set 4	Set 5	Total	Report
07 Sep	18:00	India	1–3	Japan	25–16	18–25	20–25	21–25		84–91	

=== Final ===
Date	Time		Score		Set 1	Set 2	Set 3	Set 4	Set 5	Total	Report
07 Sep	20:00	Iran	1–3	China	18–25	14–25	25–13	29–31		86–94	

== Final standing ==
Rank	Team
1st place, gold medalist(s)	China
2nd place, silver medalist(s)	Iran
3rd place, bronze medalist(s)	Japan
4	India
5	South Korea
6	Vietnam
7	Australia
8	Myanmar

2012 Asian Men's Cup champions

China
1st title

Team Roster

Zhan Guojun, Dai Qingyao, Zhang Chen, Li Rui, Liang Chunlong, Zhong Weijun, Cui Jianjun, Geng Xin, Wang Chen, Ji Daoshuai, Li Runming, Kong Fanwei

Head Coach: Xie Guochen

== Awards ==
- MVP: (China) Zhan Guojun
- Best scorer: (India) Gurinder Singh
- Best spiker: (China) Zhong Weijun
- Best blocker: (Iran) Alireza Jadidi
- Best server: (Iran) Mohammad Taher Vadi
- Best setter: (Japan) Hideomi Fukatsu
- Best libero: (China) Kong Fanwei
