= 2017 FIVB Volleyball Men's Club World Championship squads =

This article shows the rosters of all participating teams at the 2017 FIVB Volleyball Men's Club World Championship in Poland.

== Pool A ==
=== ZAKSA Kędzierzyn-Koźle ===
The following is the roster of the Polish club ZAKSA Kędzierzyn-Koźle in the 2017 FIVB Volleyball Men's Club World Championship.

- Head coach: (Italy) Andrea Gardini

No.	Name	Date of birth	Height	Weight	Spike	Block
1	(Poland) Paweł Zatorski	21 June 1990	1.84 m (6 ft 0 in)	73 kg (161 lb)	328 cm (129 in)	304 cm (120 in)
3	(Poland) Rafał Szymura	29 September 1995	1.96 m (6 ft 5 in)	93 kg (205 lb)	340 cm (130 in)	310 cm (120 in)
4	(Poland) Krzysztof Rejno	22 February 1993	2.03 m (6 ft 8 in)	83 kg (183 lb)	351 cm (138 in)	327 cm (129 in)
5	(Italy) Marco Falaschi	18 September 1987	1.88 m (6 ft 2 in)	86 kg (190 lb)	340 cm (130 in)	318 cm (125 in)
6	(France) Benjamin Toniutti (C)	30 October 1989	1.83 m (6 ft 0 in)	73 kg (161 lb)	320 cm (130 in)	300 cm (120 in)
7	(Poland) Rafał Buszek	28 April 1987	1.94 m (6 ft 4 in)	81 kg (179 lb)	345 cm (136 in)	327 cm (129 in)
8	(Poland) Sławomir Jungiewicz	21 June 1989	1.96 m (6 ft 5 in)	86 kg (190 lb)	355 cm (140 in)	330 cm (130 in)
9	(Poland) Łukasz Wiśniewski	3 February 1989	1.98 m (6 ft 6 in)	96 kg (212 lb)	345 cm (136 in)	323 cm (127 in)
10	(Poland) Mateusz Bieniek	5 April 1994	2.10 m (6 ft 11 in)	98 kg (216 lb)	351 cm (138 in)	326 cm (128 in)
11	(Puerto Rico) Maurice Torres	6 July 1991	2.01 m (6 ft 7 in)	100 kg (220 lb)	305 cm (120 in)	299 cm (118 in)
12	(Poland) Krzysztof Zapłacki	8 August 1993	1.96 m (6 ft 5 in)	84 kg (185 lb)	351 cm (138 in)	0 cm (0 in)
13	(Poland) Kamil Semeniuk	16 July 1996	1.91 m (6 ft 3 in)	82 kg (181 lb)	350 cm (140 in)	335 cm (132 in)
15	(Belgium) Sam Deroo	29 April 1992	2.03 m (6 ft 8 in)	105 kg (231 lb)	355 cm (140 in)	335 cm (132 in)
17	(Poland) Aleksander Maziarz	22 April 1995	2.03 m (6 ft 8 in)	0 kg (0 lb)	347 cm (137 in)	330 cm (130 in)
18	(Poland) Korneliusz Banach	25 January 1994	1.80 m (5 ft 11 in)	75 kg (165 lb)	320 cm (130 in)	305 cm (120 in)

=== Cucine Lube Civitanova ===
The following is the roster of the Italian club Cucine Lube Civitanova in the 2017 FIVB Volleyball Men's Club World Championship.

- Head coach: (Italy) Giampaolo Medei

No.	Name	Date of birth	Height	Weight	Spike	Block
1	(Bulgaria) Tsvetan Sokolov	31 December 1989	2.06 m (6 ft 9 in)	100 kg (220 lb)	370 cm (150 in)	350 cm (140 in)
2	(Italy) Davide Candellaro	7 June 1989	2.00 m (6 ft 7 in)	88 kg (194 lb)	340 cm (130 in)	320 cm (130 in)
3	(United States) Taylor Sander	17 March 1992	1.96 m (6 ft 5 in)	80 kg (180 lb)	345 cm (136 in)	320 cm (130 in)
4	(Italy) Andrea Marchisio	6 November 1990	1.82 m (6 ft 0 in)	86 kg (190 lb)	315 cm (124 in)	305 cm (120 in)
5	(Italy) Osmany Juantorena	12 August 1985	2.00 m (6 ft 7 in)	85 kg (187 lb)	370 cm (150 in)	340 cm (130 in)
6	(Italy) Alberto Casadei	15 September 1984	1.99 m (6 ft 6 in)	82 kg (181 lb)	337 cm (133 in)	320 cm (130 in)
7	(Serbia) Dragan Stanković (C)	18 October 1985	2.05 m (6 ft 9 in)	94 kg (207 lb)	355 cm (140 in)	330 cm (130 in)
9	(Italy) Jiří Kovář	10 April 1989	2.02 m (6 ft 8 in)	95 kg (209 lb)	353 cm (139 in)	330 cm (130 in)
10	(France) Jenia Grebennikov	13 August 1990	1.88 m (6 ft 2 in)	85 kg (187 lb)	345 cm (136 in)	330 cm (130 in)
11	(United States) Micah Christenson	8 May 1993	1.98 m (6 ft 6 in)	88 kg (194 lb)	349 cm (137 in)	340 cm (130 in)
12	(Italy) Enrico Cester	16 March 1988	2.02 m (6 ft 8 in)	93 kg (205 lb)	336 cm (132 in)	321 cm (126 in)
14	(Italy) Sebastiano Milan	6 April 1995	2.04 m (6 ft 8 in)	85 kg (187 lb)	355 cm (140 in)	258 cm (102 in)
15	(Croatia) Tsimafei Zhukouski	18 December 1989	1.94 m (6 ft 4 in)	78 kg (172 lb)	340 cm (130 in)	330 cm (130 in)

=== Sada Cruzeiro Vôlei ===
The following is the roster of the Brazilian club Sada Cruzeiro Vôlei in the 2017 FIVB Volleyball Men's Club World Championship.

- Head coach: (Argentina) Marcelo Méndez

No.	Name	Date of birth	Height	Weight	Spike	Block
1	(Brazil) Pablo Ventura	29 April 1998	1.94 m (6 ft 4 in)	92 kg (203 lb)	336 cm (132 in)	315 cm (124 in)
2	(Brazil) Rodrigo Telles	3 March 1990	2.00 m (6 ft 7 in)	88 kg (194 lb)	330 cm (130 in)	310 cm (120 in)
3	(Brazil) Éder Levy Kock	4 July 1993	2.07 m (6 ft 9 in)	99 kg (218 lb)	335 cm (132 in)	315 cm (124 in)
5	(Argentina) Nicolás Uriarte	21 March 1990	1.92 m (6 ft 4 in)	87 kg (192 lb)	342 cm (135 in)	322 cm (127 in)
6	(Brazil) Robert Araújo	10 March 1996	2.03 m (6 ft 8 in)	97 kg (214 lb)	359 cm (141 in)	325 cm (128 in)
7	(Brazil) Lucas Batista Silva	28 September 1999	1.74 m (5 ft 9 in)	73 kg (161 lb)	300 cm (120 in)	290 cm (110 in)
8	(Brazil) Evandro Guerra	27 December 1981	2.07 m (6 ft 9 in)	106 kg (234 lb)	359 cm (141 in)	332 cm (131 in)
9	(Brazil) Yoandy Leal	31 August 1988	2.02 m (6 ft 8 in)	107 kg (236 lb)	361 cm (142 in)	348 cm (137 in)
10	(Cuba) Robertlandy Simón	11 June 1987	2.08 m (6 ft 10 in)	114 kg (251 lb)	358 cm (141 in)	326 cm (128 in)
11	(Brazil) Rodrigo Leão	5 June 1996	1.97 m (6 ft 6 in)	85 kg (187 lb)	331 cm (130 in)	316 cm (124 in)
12	(Brazil) Isac Santos	13 December 1990	2.08 m (6 ft 10 in)	99 kg (218 lb)	339 cm (133 in)	306 cm (120 in)
14	(Brazil) Fernando Kreling	13 January 1996	1.85 m (6 ft 1 in)	85 kg (187 lb)	319 cm (126 in)	301 cm (119 in)
17	(Brazil) Sérgio Nogueira	25 August 1978	1.84 m (6 ft 0 in)	79 kg (174 lb)	322 cm (127 in)	319 cm (126 in)
18	(Brazil) Filipe Ferraz (C)	1 March 1980	1.94 m (6 ft 4 in)	90 kg (200 lb)	335 cm (132 in)	305 cm (120 in)

=== Sarmayeh Bank Tehran ===
The following is the roster of the Iranian club Sarmayeh Bank Tehran in the 2017 FIVB Volleyball Men's Club World Championship.

- Head coach: (Iran) Mostafa Karkhaneh

No.	Name	Date of birth	Height	Weight	Spike	Block
1	(Iran) Shahram Mahmoudi	20 July 1988	1.98 m (6 ft 6 in)	95 kg (209 lb)	347 cm (137 in)	332 cm (131 in)
4	(Iran) Mohammad Daliri	1 February 1995	1.87 m (6 ft 2 in)	77 kg (170 lb)	320 cm (130 in)	306 cm (120 in)
5	(Iran) Farhad Ghaemi	28 August 1989	1.97 m (6 ft 6 in)	73 kg (161 lb)	355 cm (140 in)	335 cm (132 in)
6	(Iran) Mohammad Mousavi	22 August 1987	2.03 m (6 ft 8 in)	86 kg (190 lb)	362 cm (143 in)	344 cm (135 in)
7	(Iran) Ghasem Karkhaneh	22 August 1994	1.95 m (6 ft 5 in)	80 kg (180 lb)	338 cm (133 in)	335 cm (132 in)
9	(Iran) Adel Gholami	9 February 1986	1.95 m (6 ft 5 in)	88 kg (194 lb)	341 cm (134 in)	330 cm (130 in)
10	(Iran) Alireza Mobasheri	10 June 1988	1.90 m (6 ft 3 in)	90 kg (200 lb)	345 cm (136 in)	320 cm (130 in)
12	(Iran) Mojtaba Mirzajanpour	7 October 1991	2.05 m (6 ft 9 in)	88 kg (194 lb)	355 cm (140 in)	348 cm (137 in)
13	(Iran) Mehdi Mahdavi (C)	13 February 1984	1.90 m (6 ft 3 in)	82 kg (181 lb)	330 cm (130 in)	315 cm (124 in)
15	(Poland) Łukasz Żygadło	2 August 1979	2.00 m (6 ft 7 in)	89 kg (196 lb)	337 cm (133 in)	325 cm (128 in)
16	(Iran) Ali Shafiei	21 September 1991	1.90 m (6 ft 3 in)	80 kg (180 lb)	348 cm (137 in)	345 cm (136 in)
17	(Iran) Reza Ghara	31 July 1991	2.00 m (6 ft 7 in)	87 kg (192 lb)	351 cm (138 in)	331 cm (130 in)
19	(Iran) Mehdi Marandi	12 May 1986	1.72 m (5 ft 8 in)	69 kg (152 lb)	295 cm (116 in)	280 cm (110 in)

== Pool B ==
=== PGE Skra Bełchatów ===
The following is the roster of the Polish club PGE Skra Bełchatów in the 2017 FIVB Volleyball Men's Club World Championship.

- Head coach: (Italy) Roberto Piazza

No.	Name	Date of birth	Height	Weight	Spike	Block
1	(Serbia) Srećko Lisinac	17 May 1992	2.05 m (6 ft 9 in)	90 kg (200 lb)	355 cm (140 in)	342 cm (135 in)
2	(Poland) Mariusz Wlazły (C)	4 August 1983	1.94 m (6 ft 4 in)	80 kg (180 lb)	360 cm (140 in)	329 cm (130 in)
5	(Poland) Marcin Janusz	31 July 1994	1.95 m (6 ft 5 in)	85 kg (187 lb)	330 cm (130 in)	316 cm (124 in)
6	(Poland) Karol Kłos	8 August 1989	2.01 m (6 ft 7 in)	87 kg (192 lb)	357 cm (141 in)	326 cm (128 in)
7	(Poland) Bartosz Bednorz	25 July 1994	2.01 m (6 ft 7 in)	84 kg (185 lb)	350 cm (140 in)	315 cm (124 in)
8	(Serbia) Milan Katić	22 October 1993	2.02 m (6 ft 8 in)	99 kg (218 lb)	345 cm (136 in)	331 cm (130 in)
9	(Poland) Patryk Czarnowski	1 November 1985	2.02 m (6 ft 8 in)	95 kg (209 lb)	363 cm (143 in)	335 cm (132 in)
11	(Iran) Milad Ebadipour	17 October 1993	1.96 m (6 ft 5 in)	78 kg (172 lb)	350 cm (140 in)	310 cm (120 in)
13	(Poland) Szymon Romać	1 October 1992	1.96 m (6 ft 5 in)	89 kg (196 lb)	336 cm (132 in)	309 cm (122 in)
14	(Serbia) Aleksandar Nedeljković	27 October 1997	2.05 m (6 ft 9 in)	96 kg (212 lb)	338 cm (133 in)	318 cm (125 in)
15	(Poland) Grzegorz Łomacz	1 October 1987	1.87 m (6 ft 2 in)	80 kg (180 lb)	335 cm (132 in)	315 cm (124 in)
16	(Poland) Kacper Piechocki	17 December 1995	1.84 m (6 ft 0 in)	74 kg (163 lb)	316 cm (124 in)	305 cm (120 in)
17	(Bulgaria) Nikolay Penchev	22 May 1992	1.97 m (6 ft 6 in)	87 kg (192 lb)	341 cm (134 in)	335 cm (132 in)
18	(Poland) Robert Milczarek	28 November 1983	1.88 m (6 ft 2 in)	0 kg (0 lb)	335 cm (132 in)	312 cm (123 in)

=== Zenit Kazan ===
The following is the roster of the Russian club Zenit Kazan in the 2017 FIVB Volleyball Men's Club World Championship.

- Head coach: (Russia) Vladimir Alekno

No.	Name	Date of birth	Height	Weight	Spike	Block
1	(United States) Matt Anderson	18 April 1987	2.02 m (6 ft 8 in)	100 kg (220 lb)	360 cm (140 in)	332 cm (131 in)
4	(Russia) Artem Volvich	22 January 1990	2.08 m (6 ft 10 in)	96 kg (212 lb)	350 cm (140 in)	330 cm (130 in)
5	(Russia) Loran Alekno	18 September 1996	1.96 m (6 ft 5 in)	90 kg (200 lb)	330 cm (130 in)	320 cm (130 in)
6	(Russia) Igor Yudin	17 June 1987	2.00 m (6 ft 7 in)	85 kg (187 lb)	362 cm (143 in)	352 cm (139 in)
7	(Russia) Maxim Panteleymonenko	1 September 1981	2.04 m (6 ft 8 in)	102 kg (225 lb)	362 cm (143 in)	339 cm (133 in)
8	(Russia) Nikita Alekseev	15 July 1992	2.06 m (6 ft 9 in)	102 kg (225 lb)	340 cm (130 in)	330 cm (130 in)
9	(Poland) Wilfredo León	31 July 1993	2.02 m (6 ft 8 in)	96 kg (212 lb)	350 cm (140 in)	346 cm (136 in)
10	(Russia) Aleksei Kononov	9 April 1997	2.05 m (6 ft 9 in)	93 kg (205 lb)	350 cm (140 in)	340 cm (130 in)
11	(Russia) Valentin Krotkov	1 September 1991	1.95 m (6 ft 5 in)	84 kg (185 lb)	340 cm (130 in)	330 cm (130 in)
12	(Russia) Aleksandr Butko (C)	18 March 1986	1.98 m (6 ft 6 in)	97 kg (214 lb)	339 cm (133 in)	327 cm (129 in)
13	(Russia) Alexey Samoylenko	23 June 1985	2.07 m (6 ft 9 in)	98 kg (216 lb)	360 cm (140 in)	330 cm (130 in)
14	(Russia) Alexander Gutsalyuk	15 January 1988	2.05 m (6 ft 9 in)	105 kg (231 lb)	362 cm (143 in)	345 cm (136 in)
16	(Russia) Aleksey Verbov	31 January 1982	1.86 m (6 ft 1 in)	79 kg (174 lb)	250 cm (98 in)	250 cm (98 in)
18	(Russia) Maxim Mikhaylov	19 March 1988	2.02 m (6 ft 8 in)	103 kg (227 lb)	345 cm (136 in)	330 cm (130 in)

=== Personal Bolívar ===
The following is the roster of the Argentine club Personal Bolívar in the 2017 FIVB Volleyball Men's Club World Championship.

- Head coach: (Argentina) Javier Weber

No.	Name	Date of birth	Height	Weight	Spike	Block
1	(Argentina) Gabriel Arroyo	3 March 1977	1.94 m (6 ft 4 in)	95 kg (209 lb)	352 cm (139 in)	327 cm (129 in)
2	(Argentina) Maximiliano Gauna	20 April 1989	1.97 m (6 ft 6 in)	93 kg (205 lb)	338 cm (133 in)	320 cm (130 in)
3	(Argentina) Leonardo Patti (C)	6 July 1978	1.88 m (6 ft 2 in)	95 kg (209 lb)	340 cm (130 in)	320 cm (130 in)
4	(Argentina) Edgardo Lioca	22 December 1990	1.93 m (6 ft 4 in)	79 kg (174 lb)	312 cm (123 in)	300 cm (120 in)
5	(Argentina) Nahuel Codesal	12 June 2000	1.84 m (6 ft 0 in)	66 kg (146 lb)	305 cm (120 in)	293 cm (115 in)
6	(Bulgaria) Rozalin Penchev	11 December 1994	1.97 m (6 ft 6 in)	79 kg (174 lb)	337 cm (133 in)	327 cm (129 in)
7	(Brazil) Théo Lopes	31 August 1983	1.99 m (6 ft 6 in)	80 kg (180 lb)	345 cm (136 in)	324 cm (128 in)
9	(Argentina) Daniel Eduardo Galván	8 February 1988	0 m (0 in)	0 kg (0 lb)	0 cm (0 in)	0 cm (0 in)
10	(Serbia) Miloš Nikić	31 March 1986	1.94 m (6 ft 4 in)	79 kg (174 lb)	350 cm (140 in)	330 cm (130 in)
13	(Argentina) Guillermo García	21 September 1983	1.93 m (6 ft 4 in)	92 kg (203 lb)	352 cm (139 in)	340 cm (130 in)
14	(Argentina) Pablo Crer	12 June 1989	2.02 m (6 ft 8 in)	85 kg (187 lb)	357 cm (141 in)	337 cm (133 in)
16	(Argentina) Alexis González	21 July 1981	1.84 m (6 ft 0 in)	85 kg (187 lb)	327 cm (129 in)	310 cm (120 in)
17	(Argentina) Germán Galdón	4 March 1989	1.93 m (6 ft 4 in)	103 kg (227 lb)	320 cm (130 in)	302 cm (119 in)
20	(Argentina) Martín Hernández	23 March 1985	2.02 m (6 ft 8 in)	80 kg (180 lb)	351 cm (138 in)	330 cm (130 in)

=== Shanghai Golden Age ===
The following is the roster of the Chinese club Shanghai Golden Age in the 2017 FIVB Volleyball Men's Club World Championship.

- Head coach: (China) Shen Qiong

No.	Name	Date of birth	Height	Weight	Spike	Block
1	(China) Gu Jiafeng	27 September 1996	2.03 m (6 ft 8 in)	87 kg (192 lb)	355 cm (140 in)	345 cm (136 in)
2	(China) Liu Meng	11 February 1995	1.95 m (6 ft 5 in)	80 kg (180 lb)	340 cm (130 in)	330 cm (130 in)
4	(China) Zhang Chen (C)	28 June 1985	2.00 m (6 ft 7 in)	85 kg (187 lb)	355 cm (140 in)	344 cm (135 in)
5	(China) Rao Shuhan	23 December 1996	2.05 m (6 ft 9 in)	99 kg (218 lb)	360 cm (140 in)	350 cm (140 in)
7	(Argentina) Facundo Conte	25 August 1989	1.97 m (6 ft 6 in)	88 kg (194 lb)	354 cm (139 in)	334 cm (131 in)
8	(China) Tong Jiahua	13 December 1992	1.80 m (5 ft 11 in)	76 kg (168 lb)	330 cm (130 in)	320 cm (130 in)
9	(China) Zhan Guojun	16 December 1988	1.97 m (6 ft 6 in)	85 kg (187 lb)	350 cm (140 in)	340 cm (130 in)
10	(China) Zhong Weijun	20 April 1989	2.00 m (6 ft 7 in)	95 kg (209 lb)	355 cm (140 in)	340 cm (130 in)
11	(China) Jiang Chuan	9 August 1994	2.05 m (6 ft 9 in)	91 kg (201 lb)	365 cm (144 in)	345 cm (136 in)
12	(China) Zhang Zhejia	31 August 1995	2.11 m (6 ft 11 in)	92 kg (203 lb)	365 cm (144 in)	355 cm (140 in)
15	(France) Julien Lyneel	15 April 1990	1.92 m (6 ft 4 in)	87 kg (192 lb)	345 cm (136 in)	325 cm (128 in)
16	(China) Ren Qi	24 February 1984	1.74 m (5 ft 9 in)	70 kg (150 lb)	322 cm (127 in)	312 cm (123 in)
17	(China) Zhang Binglong	11 September 1994	1.97 m (6 ft 6 in)	99 kg (218 lb)	355 cm (140 in)	345 cm (136 in)
18	(China) Wang Jingyi	7 February 1998	2.02 m (6 ft 8 in)	87 kg (192 lb)	360 cm (140 in)	350 cm (140 in)
