= Ding Hui =

Ding Hui may refer to:

- Ding Hui (general) (died 910/11), Chinese general
- Ding Hui (volleyball) (born 1989), Chinese volleyball player of South African descent
