= Liu Changcheng =

Liu Changcheng is the name of:

- Liu Changcheng (skier) (born 1961), Chinese alpine skier
- Liu Changcheng (volleyball) (1964–2026), Chinese volleyball player
