= Samuel Fuchs =

Brazilian volleyball player (born 1984)

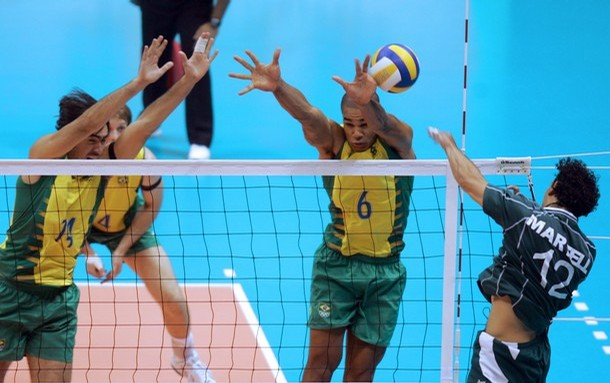

Personal information
- Born: 4 March 1984 (age 42); Curitiba, Brazil
- Height: 200 cm (6 ft 7 in)
- Weight: 95 kg (209 lb)

Volleyball information
- Position: Outside spiker

Career
Years	Teams
2001–2007	Minas Tênis Clube
2007–2008	Belogorie Belgorod
2008–2009	Ulbra/Canoas
2009–2011	Sada Cruzeiro
2011–2013	Minas Tênis Clube
2014–2015	Minas Tênis Clube
2015–2016	Voleisul/Paquetá Esportes
2016–2017	Minas Tênis Clube

National team
2005–2008	Brazil
Honours
Men's volleyball
Representing Brazil
Olympic Games
Silver medal – second place	2008 Beijing	Team
World Championship
Gold medal – first place	2006 Japan	Team
World Cup
Gold medal – first place	2007 Japan	Team
World Grand Champions Cup
Gold medal – first place	2005 Japan	Team
World League
Gold medal – first place	2005 Belgrade
Gold medal – first place	2006 Moscow
Gold medal – first place	2007 Katowice
Pan American Games
Gold medal – first place	2007 Rio de Janeiro	Team

Samuel Fuchs (born 4 March 1984) is a Brazilian volleyball player who won a silver medal at the 2008 Summer Olympics.

He was born in Curitiba.
