= Moon Sung-min =

South Korean volleyball player (born 1986)

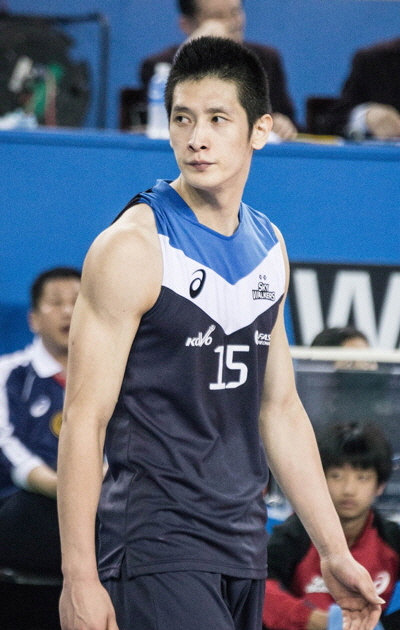

Personal information
- Born: 14 September 1986 (age 40); Busan, South Korea
- Height: 1.98 m (6 ft 6 in)
- Education: Kyonggi University

Volleyball information
- Position: Opposite spiker
- Current club: (South Korea) Cheonan Hyundai Capital Skywalkers
- Number: 15

Career
Years	Teams
2008–2009; 2009–2010; 2010–2025	(Germany) VfB Friedrichshafen (Turkey) Halkbank Ankara (South Korea) Hyundai Capital Skywalkers

National team
2006–2019	South Korea
Honours
Men's volleyball
Representing South Korea
Asian Games
Gold medal – first place	2006 Doha	Team
Silver medal – second place	2018 Jakarta-Palembang	Team
Bronze medal – third place	2010 Guangzhou	Team
Asian Championship
Bronze medal – third place	2007 Jakarta
Bronze medal – third place	2017 Gresik
Asian Cup
Silver medal – second place	2008 Nakhon Ratchasima
Asian Junior Championship
Gold medal – first place	2004 Doha

- Moon Sung-min
- Hangul: 문성민
- Hanja: 文聖民
- RR: Mun Seongmin
- MR: Mun Sŏngmin

Moon Sung-min (Korean: 문성민; born September 14, 1986) is a male volleyball player from South Korea. He currently plays as an opposite spiker for the Cheonan Hyundai Capital Skywalkers in the V-League.

He signed with German club VfB Friedrichshafen in 2008.
