= Jiao Shuai =

Chinese volleyball player (born 1984)

Personal information
- Nationality: Chinese
- Born: 28 January 1984 (age 42)
- Height: 194 cm (6 ft 4 in)
- Weight: 75 kg (165 lb)
- Spike: 350 cm (138 in)
- Block: 341 cm (134 in)

Coaching information
- Current team: Henan women's VC
Previous teams coached
Years	Teams
2017 - present	Henan Volleyball

Volleyball information
- Position: Setter

Career
Years	Teams
2005 - 2017	Henan men's VC

National team
2008 - 2016	China
- Last updated: December 2017

Jiao Shuai (焦帥, born 28 January 1984 in Zhengzhou, Henan) is a retired male Chinese volleyball player. He was part of the bronze medal-winning team at the 2006-2007 National League.

He competed for Team China at the 2008 Summer Olympics in Beijing.

He is the head coach of Henan Women's Volleyball Club now.
