= Li Runming =

Chinese volleyball player (born 1990)

Personal information
- Nationality: Chinese
- Born: 1 March 1990 (age 36)
- Height: 1.98 m (6 ft 6 in)
- Weight: 90 kg (198 lb)
- Spike: 350 cm (138 in)
- Block: 326 cm (128 in)

Volleyball information
- Position: Setter
- Current club: Beijing
- Number: 6

Career
Years	Teams
2007 - 2018; 2018 - present	Shandong; Beijing

National team
2009 - present	China

Li Runming (born 1 March 1990) is a Chinese volleyball player. He was part of the China men's national volleyball team at the 2014 FIVB Volleyball Men's World Championship in Poland. He played for Shandong.

== Clubs ==
- 2019 GFC Ajaccio
- 2007 / 2018 Shandong
- Beijing (2014 Asian Club Championship, 2018 loaned starting in the semifinal matches, 2018–present)
