= Geng Xin =

Chinese volleyball player (born 1989)

Personal information
- Nationality: Chinese
- Born: 15 November 1989 (age 36)
- Height: 2.08 m (6 ft 10 in)
- Weight: 80 kg (176 lb)
- Spike: 348 cm (137 in)
- Block: 338 cm (133 in)

Volleyball information
- Current club: Panasonic Panthers
- Number: 26

Career
Years	Teams
2009 - 2021; 2021 – 2022; 2022 – 2023	Shandong; Tianjin Bohai Bank; Panasonic Panthers

National team
2011 - present	China

Geng Xin (born 15 November 1989) is a Chinese male volleyball player. He was part of the China men's national volleyball team at the 2014 FIVB Volleyball Men's World Championship in Poland. At club level, he plays for Panasonic Panthers.

== Clubs ==
- Shandong (2014)
