= Bian Hongmin =

Chinese volleyball player (born 1989)

Personal information
- Full name: Bian Hongmin
- Nationality: Chinese
- Born: September 22, 1989 (age 37); Hangzhou, Zhejiang, People's Republic of China

Bian Hongmin (Chinese: 边洪敏; pinyin: Biān Hóngmǐn; born September 22, 1989, in Hangzhou, Zhejiang) is a male Chinese volleyball player. He was part of the silver medal-winning team at the 2007 U19 World Youth Championship.

He competed for Team China at the 2008 Summer Olympics in Beijing, China.
