= Ding Hui (volleyball) =

Chinese volleyball player (born 1989)

Personal information
- Nationality: Chinese
- Born: 24 June 1989 (age 37); Hangzhou, China
- Height: 185 cm (6 ft 1 in)
- Weight: 80 kg (176 lb)
- Spike: 330 cm (130 in)
- Block: 320 cm (126 in)

Career
Years	Teams
2009 – 2013	Zhejiang
2017 – 2018	Beijing
2018 – present	Shanghai

National team
2009 – 2010	China

Ding Hui (Chinese: 丁慧; pinyin: Dīng Huì, born 24 June 1989) is a Chinese professional volleyball player for Shanghai Men's Volleyball Club. Born in Hangzhou to a South African father, in 2009, he became the first Chinese athlete of African descent to make a Chinese national sports team.

== Life ==
Ding Hui was born on 24 June 1989 to a Chinese single mother in Hangzhou. He only spoke Mandarin Chinese and did not know his father beyond phone calls. As a young child, Ding's mother says he was shy and reluctant to leave the house due to his mixed race appearance. At age ten, he gained confidence after starting volleyball and gathered success in local leagues before joining the State Youth Volleyball Team in 2004. Ding's first significant attention came after competing with the Chinese team at the 2007 World Youth Championships and taking an unexpected second place finish. This put him on the radar of Zhou Jianan, China's national coach for the 2008 Olympic team, who ultimately decided Ding was too young. Ding is "also a great singer and dancer and he brings more passion to the game than the other players," said Wang Hebing, the head coach of the regional Zhejiang volleyball team.

Ding Hui was selected for China's national team in 2009, and attracted significant attention in China as the first Black player on any national team. Media emphasized his "thick lips and big white teeth" and nicknamed him "Little Black" (Xiao Hei), writing that "because he's a 'black kid', one might mistake him for a foreigner". Ding previously stated that he was not a foreign player. The national volleyball coach Zhou Jianan was inundated with calls and inquiries about Ding's heritage, which the coach dismissed with irritation. On the team, Ding became known as an exceptional Libero. He was a favorite among players for his energy and joking personality. He additionally continued to play with his local team, the Zhejiang men's volleyball team.

Though expected to be a key athlete for China in the 2012 London Olympics, he did not ultimately make the team. In fall 2012, Ding decided to study abroad at Irvine Valley College in Southern California. Ding greatly enjoyed the U.S., saying he could consider the past and had improved discipline. "Being abroad, I was more solitary and calmer," he later said in Mandarin. Meanwhile, the Zhejiang men's volleyball team played disastrously without him, and dropped from top in the league to risking relegation. Hours after his final exam in California, Ding was flying to China to help his team. With him playing they successfully avoided getting relegated, but Ding nonetheless felt devastated to have left his teammates to struggle and suffer injuries. "I can't describe the feeling, I feel really sad" he said in Mandarin

He began to play volleyball at Warner University in Florida in 2014, and won an All-American award all years he was on the team. When asked how he felt in 2015, when won a National Defense Award as well, Ding simply responded, "I'm just thankful".
