= Cao Ping =

Chinese volleyball player (1958–2025)

Personal information
- Nationality: Chinese
- Born: 22 April 1958
- Died: 24 October 2025 (aged 67)

Sport
- Sport: Volleyball

Cao Ping (22 April 1958 – 24 October 2025) was a Chinese volleyball player. He competed in the men's tournament at the 1984 Summer Olympics.
