= Shi Hairong =

Chinese volleyball player (born 1977)

Shi Hairong (施海荣) (born 1977-03-27 in Nantong, Jiangsu) is a male Chinese volleyball player. He was part of the gold medal winning team at the 2001 National Games.

He competed for Team China at the 2008 Summer Olympics in Beijing.
