= Chu Hui (volleyball) =

Chinese volleyball player (born 1981)

Personal information
- Full name: 初辉
- Nationality: Chinese
- Born: 11 February 1981 (age 45)
- Height: 187 cm (6 ft 2 in)
- Weight: 70 kg (154 lb)
- Spike: 355 cm (140 in)
- Block: 323 cm (127 in)

Volleyball information
- Number: 15

Career
Years	Teams
2001 - 2009; 2012 - 2018	Liaoning, China; Beijing, China

National team
2001 - 2016	China

Chu Hui (born 11 February 1981) is a Chinese male volleyball player. He was part of the China men's national volleyball team at the 2002 FIVB Volleyball Men's World Championship in Argentina.

== Clubs ==
- Liaoning, China (2001 - 2009)
- Retired and as an assistant coach of Shandong women's club (2009 - 2012)
- Beijing, China (2012 - 2018)
- Retired and as an assistant coach of Beijing women's coach (2018–present)
