= Zhou Jianan =

Chinese volleyball player (born 1964)

Zhuo Jianan
Personal information
- Nationality: Chinese
- Born: 17 April 1964 (age 62)
- Height: 190 cm (6 ft 3 in)

Volleyball information

Career
- Years: Team
- 1994: Sichuan

National team
- Years: Team
- 1994: China

Zhou Jian'an (Chinese: 周建安; pinyin: Zhōu Jiàn'ān) is a Chinese former volleyball player and current volleyball coach. Zhou has been the head coach of the China men's national volleyball team since 2006.
