= Maxim Mamedov =

Kazakhstani volleyball player (born 1987)

Personal information
- Nationality: Kazakhstani
- Born: 19 July 1987 (age 39)
- Height: 200 cm (6 ft 7 in)
- Weight: 88 kg (194 lb)
- Spike: 340 cm (134 in)
- Block: 320 cm (126 in)

Volleyball information
- Number: 19 (national team)

Career
Years	Teams
2015	Tnk Kazchrome

National team
2014-	Kazakhstan

Maxim Mamedov (born 19 July 1987) is a Kazakhstani male volleyball player. He is part of the Kazakhstan men's national volleyball team. On club level he plays for Tnk Kazchrome.
