= Sergey Kostiv =

Kazakhstani volleyball player (born 1987)

Personal information
- Nationality: Kazakhstani
- Born: 25 January 1987 (age 39)
- Height: 201 cm (6 ft 7 in)
- Weight: 99 kg (218 lb)
- Spike: 350 cm (138 in)
- Block: 335 cm (132 in)

Volleyball information
- Number: 14 (national team)

Career
Years	Teams
2015	Essil Vc

National team
2015	Kazakhstan

Sergey Kostiv (born 25 January 1987) is a Kazakhstani male volleyball player. He is part of the Kazakhstan men's national volleyball team. On club level he plays for Essil Vc.
