= Zhong Weijun =

Chinese volleyball player (born 1989)

Personal information
- Full name: Zhong Weijun
- Born: April 20, 1989 Yantai, China
- Height: 2.00 m (6 ft 7 in)
- Weight: 95 kg (209 lb)

Volleyball information
- Position: Outside hitter
- Current club: Bayi
- Number: 7

National team
- Years: Team
- 2007–: China
Honours
Men's volleyball
Representing China
Asian Championship
Bronze medal – third place	2013 United Arab Emirates	Team

Zhong Weijun (Chinese: 仲为君;, born 20 April 1989) is a member and Captain of the China men's national volleyball team. On club level he plays for Bayi.

== National team ==
=== Senior team ===
- 2008 Asian Cup – Bronze medal
- 2010 Asian Cup – Silver medal
- 2011 Asian Championship – Silver medal
- 2012 Asian Cup – Gold medal
- 2013 Asian Championship – Bronze medal
