= Song Jinwei =

Chinese volleyball player (born 1959)

Personal information
- Nationality: Chinese
- Born: 14 April 1959 (age 66)

Sport
- Sport: Volleyball

Song Jinwei (born 14 April 1959) is a Chinese volleyball player. He competed in the men's tournament at the 1984 Summer Olympics.
