= Yu Koshikawa =

Japanese volleyball player (born 1984)

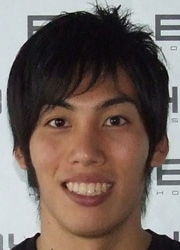

Personal information
- Full name: Yu Koshikawa
- Nickname: Yu
- Born: June 30, 1984 (age 42) Kanazawa, Ishikawa, Japan
- Height: 1.90 m (6 ft 3 in)
- Weight: 86 kg (190 lb)
- Spike: 347 cm (137 in)
- Block: 330 cm (130 in)

Volleyball information
- Position: Outside hitter / Wing spiker
- Current club: Voreas Hokkaido
- Number: 7

National team
- Years: Team
- 2002–2016: Japan
Medal record
Men's volleyball
Representing Japan
Asian Games
Silver medal – second place	2014 Incheon	Team
Asian Championship
Gold medal – first place	2009 Manila	Team
Silver medal – second place	2007 Jakarta	Team

Yu Koshikawa (越川 優, Koshikawa Yū; born June 30, 1984) is a Japanese volleyball player who plays for Voreas Hokkaido in V.League Division 2.

In July 2009, Suntory Sunbirds announced that Koshikawa would move to Pallavolo Padova next season.

In July 2012, Suntory Sunbirds announced Koshikawa would join the club in the next season.

== Club ==
Club	Country	Year
Nagano Prefecture, Okaya Technical High School	Japan	–
Suntory Sunbirds	Japan	2003–2009
Pallavolo Padova	Italy	2009-2012
Suntory Sunbirds	Japan	2012–2013
JT Thunders	Japan	2014–2017
Voreas Hokkaido	Japan	2020–present

== Awards ==
=== Individuals ===
- 2003-04 Men's V.Premier League – "New Face Award "
- 2005 Asian Championship "Best Scorer"
- 2005-06 Men's V.Premier League – "Best Server" and "Best 6"
- 2006-2007 Men's V.Premier League – "MVP"
- 2005 Asian Championship "Best Server"
- 2008-09 Men's V.Premier League – "Best Server"
- 2009 59th Kurowashiki Tournament – "Best 6"
- 2012-13 Men's V.Premier League – "Best Server"
- 2013-14 Men's V.Premier League – "Best Server" and "Best 6"
- 2014 63rd Kurowashi Tournament – "Best Server" and "Best6"

=== Team ===
- 2003-04 V.League – Champion, with Suntory Sunbirds
- 2004-05 V.League – 5th place, with Suntory Sunbirds
- 2005-06 V.League – Runner-Up, with Suntory Sunbirds
- 2006-07 V.Premier League – Champion, with Suntory Sunbirds
- 2007-08 V.Premier League – 3rd place, with Suntory Sunbirds
- 2007 Asian Club Championship – 5th place, with Suntory Sunbirds
- 2008-09 V.Premier League – 4th place, with Suntory Sunbirds
- 2008 Asian Club Championship – 3rd place, with Suntory Sunbirds
- 2009–10 Men's Volleyball Serie A2 – 5th place, with Pallavolo Padova
- 2010–11 Men's Volleyball Serie A2 – Runner-Up, with Pallavolo Padova
- 2011–12 Men's Volleyball Serie A1 – 13th place, with Pallavolo Padova
- 2012-2013 V.Premier League – 6th place, with Suntory Sunbirds
- 2013-2014 V.Premier League – Runner-Up, with Suntory Sunbirds
- 2014 Kurowashiki All Japan Volleyball Championship – 3rd place, with JT Thunders

== National team ==
=== Senior team ===
- 2004 World League – 10th place
- 2005 World League – 10th place
- 2005 World Grand Champions Cup – 4th place
- 2005 Asian Championship – Gold Medal
- 2006 World League – 13th place
- 2006 World Championships – 8th place
- 2006 Asian Games – 5th place
- 2007 World League – 13th place
- 2007 World Cup – 9th place
- 2007 Asian Championship – Silver medal
- 2008 World League – 6th place
- 2008 Summer Olympics – 11th place
- 2010 World Championships – 13th place
- 2011 World League – 15th place
- 2011 Asian Championship – 5th place
- 2013 World League – 18th place
- 2013 World Grand Champions Cup – 6th place
- 2013 Asian Championship – 4th place
- 2014 World League – 19th place
- 2014 Asian Games – Silver medal
