= Li Yuanbo =

Chinese volleyball player (born 1995)

Personal information
- Nationality: Chinese
- Born: 27 September 1995 (age 31)
- Height: 196 cm (6 ft 5 in)
- Weight: 80 kg (176 lb)
- Spike: 345 cm (136 in)
- Block: 335 cm (132 in)

Career
| Years | Teams |
|---|---|
| 2013 - present 2018; 2019 | Henan; Bayi (loaned); Beijing |

National team
| 2015 - present | China |

Li Yuanbo (born 27 September 1995) is a Chinese male volleyball player. He is part of the China men's national volleyball team. On club level he plays for Henan.
