= Roman Fartov =

Kazakhstani volleyball player (born 1992)

Personal information
- Nationality: Kazakhstani
- Born: 2 December 1992 (age 33)
- Height: 184 cm (6 ft 0 in)
- Weight: 83 kg (183 lb)
- Spike: 325 cm (128 in)
- Block: 315 cm (124 in)

Volleyball information
- Number: 1 (national team)

Career
Years	Teams
2015	Pavlodar Vc

National team
2015	Kazakhstan

Roman Fartov (born 2 December 1992) is a Kazakhstani male volleyball player. He is part of the Kazakhstan men's national volleyball team. On club level he plays for Pavlodar Vc.
