= Mao Tianyi =

Chinese volleyball player (born 1993)

Personal information
- Nationality: Chinese
- Born: 2 June 1993 (age 33); Jilin City, Jilin Province
- Height: 200 cm (6 ft 7 in)
- Weight: 84 kg (185 lb)
- Spike: 350 cm (138 in)
- Block: 333 cm (131 in)

Volleyball information
- Position: Setter
- Current club: Bayi Volleyball Club
- Number: 3

Career
Years	Teams
2007 - 2014; 2015 - present	Guangdong; Bayi

National team
2014 - present	China
Honours
Men's volleyball
Representing China
FIVB Challenger Cup
Gold medal – first place	2024 Linyi
Asian Cup
Silver medal – second place	2016 Nakhon Pathom
- Last updated: February 16, 2018

Mao Tianyi (born 2 June 1993) is a Chinese male volleyball player. He is part of the China men's national volleyball team. On club level he plays for Bayi.
