= Yang Liqun =

Chinese volleyball player (born 1962)

Personal information
- Nationality: Chinese
- Born: 26 December 1962 (age 62)

Sport
- Sport: Volleyball

Yang Liqun (born 26 December 1962) is a Chinese volleyball player. He competed in the men's tournament at the 1984 Summer Olympics.
