= Zuo Yue =

Chinese volleyball player (born 1963)

Personal information
- Nationality: Chinese
- Born: 20 April 1963 (age 62)

Sport
- Sport: Volleyball

Zuo Yue (born 20 April 1963) is a Chinese volleyball player. He competed in the men's tournament at the 1984 Summer Olympics.
