= Liu Xiangdong =

Chinese volleyball player (born 1993)

Personal information
- Nationality: Chinese
- Born: 23 February 1993 (age 33)
- Height: 198 cm (6 ft 6 in)
- Weight: 93 kg (205 lb)
- Spike: 340 cm (134 in)
- Block: 330 cm (130 in)

Career
Years	Teams
2013 - present 2018	Jiangsu; Sichuan (loaned)

National team
2015 - 2016	China

Liu Xiangdong (born 23 February 1993) is a Chinese male volleyball player. He is part of the China men's national volleyball team. On club level he plays for Jiangsu.
