= Ke Junhuang =

Chinese volleyball player (born 1994)

Personal information
- Nationality: Chinese
- Born: 28 June 1994 (age 32)
- Height: 183 cm (6 ft 0 in)
- Weight: 72 kg (159 lb)
- Spike: 330 cm (130 in)
- Block: 320 cm (126 in)

Volleyball information
- Position: Libero
- Current club: Fujian
- Number: 14

Career
Years	Teams
2013 - present	Fujian

National team
2015 - present	China

Ke Junhuang (born 28 June 1994) is a Chinese volleyball player. He is part of the China men's national volleyball team. On club level he plays for Fujian.
