= Tong Jiahua =

Chinese volleyball player (born 1992)

Personal information
- Nationality: Chinese
- Born: 13 December 1992 (age 33)
- Height: 180 cm (5 ft 11 in)
- Weight: 76 kg (168 lb)
- Spike: 317 cm (125 in)
- Block: 305 cm (120 in)

Volleyball information
- Position: Libero
- Current club: Shanghai Golden Age
- Number: 16

Career
- Years: Team
- 2012 - present: Shanghai

National team
- Years: Team
- 2012, 2015 - present: China

Tong Jiahua (born 13 December 1992) is a Chinese male volleyball player. He is part of the China men's national volleyball team. On club level he plays for Shanghai Golden Age.
