= Dai Qingyao =

Chinese volleyball player (born 1991)

Personal information
- Nationality: Chinese
- Born: 26 September 1991 (age 35)
- Height: 205 cm (6 ft 9 in)
- Weight: 100 kg (220 lb)
- Spike: 350 cm (138 in)
- Block: 340 cm (134 in)

Career
Years	Teams
2008 - present	Shanghai

National team
2009, 2013 - present	China
Honours
Asian Games
Silver medal – second place	2022 Hangzhou	Team

Dai Qingyao (born 26 September 1991) is a Chinese male volleyball player. He is part of the China men's national volleyball team. On club level he plays for Shanghai.
