= Ji Daoshuai =

Chinese volleyball player (born 1992)

Personal information
- Nationality: Chinese
- Born: 7 February 1992 (age 34)
- Height: 1.95 m (6 ft 5 in)
- Weight: 82 kg (181 lb)
- Spike: 355 cm (140 in)
- Block: 335 cm (132 in)

Volleyball information
- Position: Outside hitter
- Current club: Suntory Sunbirds
- Number: 10 (NT) 6 (Club)

Career
Years	Teams
2009 - 2019; 2019 - present	Shandong; Suntory Sunbirds

National team
2012 - present	China

Ji Daoshuai (born 7 February 1992) is a Chinese male volleyball player. He was part of the China men's national volleyball team at the 2014 FIVB Volleyball Men's World Championship in Poland. He plays for Suntory Sunbirds now.

== Clubs ==
- Shandong (2009 - 2019)
- Suntory Sunbirds (2019–present)
