= Fang Yingchao =

Chinese volleyball player (born 1982)

Personal information
- Nationality: Chinese
- Born: 3 August 1982 (age 44); Shanghai
- Hometown: Shanghai
- Height: 198 cm (6 ft 6 in)
- Weight: 79 kg (174 lb)
- Spike: 360 cm (142 in)
- Block: 350 cm (138 in)

Volleyball information
- Position: Outside hitter / Opposite

Career
| Years | Teams |
|---|---|
| 2001 - 2017 | Shanghai Volleyball Club |

National team
| 2005; 2007 - 2008; 2014 | China |

Fang, Yingchao (simplified Chinese: 方颖超; traditional Chinese: 方穎超; born 3 August 1982 in Shanghai) is a male Chinese volleyball player. He was part of the gold medal-winning team at the 2005 National League.

He competed for Team China at the 2008 Summer Olympics in Beijing.
