= Zhan Guojun =

Chinese volleyball player (born 1988)

Personal information
- Nationality: Chinese
- Born: 16 December 1988 (age 37) Shanghai, China
- Height: 197 cm (6 ft 6 in)
- Weight: 91 kg (201 lb)
- Spike: 335 cm (132 in)
- Block: 330 cm (130 in)

Volleyball information
- Position: Setter
- Current club: Shanghai Golden Age
- Number: 9 (national team)

Career
- Years: Team
- 2009 - present: Shanghai

National team
- Years: Team
- 2011 - 2012 2017 - present: China

Zhan Guojun (born 16 December 1988) is a Chinese male volleyball player. He is part of the China men's national volleyball team. On club level he plays for Shanghai Golden Age.
