= Ren Qi =

Chinese volleyball player (born 1984)

Personal information
- Nationality: Chinese
- Born: 24 April 1984 (age 42); Shanghai
- Hometown: Shanghai
- Height: 174 cm (5 ft 9 in)
- Weight: 70 kg (154 lb)
- Spike: 322 cm (127 in)
- Block: 312 cm (123 in)

Volleyball information
- Position: Libero
- Current club: Shanghai Volleyball Club
- Number: 16

Career
Years	Teams
2004 - 2019	Shanghai Volleyball Club

National team
2006 - 2018	China
- Last updated: 28 September 2019

Ren Qi (born 1984-02-24 in Shanghai) is a former male Chinese volleyball player. He was part of the silver medal-winning team at the 2006 Asian Games.

He competed for Team China at the 2008 Summer Olympics in Beijing.
