= Jiang Fudong =

Chinese volleyball player (born 1983)

Jiang Fudong (born January 10, 1983, in Qingdao) is a Chinese volleyball player. He was part of the silver medal-winning team at the 2006 Asian Games.

He competed for Team China at the 2008 Summer Olympics in Beijing.
