= Zhang Chen (volleyball) =

Chinese volleyball player (born 1985)

Personal information
- Nationality: Chinese
- Born: 28 June 1985 (age 41)
- Height: 200 cm (6 ft 7 in)
- Weight: 89 kg (196 lb)
- Spike: 356 cm (140 in)
- Block: 340 cm (134 in)

Volleyball information
- Position: outside hitter
- Current club: Jiangsu Volleyball Club
- Number: 6

Career
- Years: Team
- 2001 - present: Jiangsu

National team
- Years: Team
- 2005, 2010 - 2018: China

Zhang Chen (born 28 June 1985) is a Chinese volleyball player. He is part of the China men's national volleyball team. On club level he plays for Jiangsu.

Zhang Changning is his younger half-sister. They have different biological mothers.
