= Liu Changcheng (volleyball) =

Chinese volleyball player and coach (1964–2026)

Liu Changcheng (Chinese: 刘长城; 3 May 1964 – 12 October 2026) was a Chinese volleyball player. He competed in the 1984 Summer Olympics. Liu later immigrated to Germany, and played for the German clubs Moerser SC (1989–1993) and Post Telekom Berlin (1993–1995). Liu later worked as a coach in Germany.

He died on 12 October 2026, at the age of 62.

== Weblinks ==
- "Liu Changcheng Bio, Stats, and Results". Sports Reference. Archived from the original on 18 April 2020.
