= Yuan Zhi =

Chinese volleyball player (born 1981)

Personal information
- Nationality: Chinese
- Born: 29 September 1981 (age 45)
- Height: 194 cm (6 ft 4 in)
- Weight: 95 kg (209 lb)
- Spike: 348 cm (137 in)
- Block: 334 cm (131 in)

Coaching information
- Current team: China women's team (assistant coach)
- Previous teams coached
- Years: Teams
- 2015–2016 2017–: China men's team (assistant coach); China women's team (assistant coach)

Volleyball information

Career
- Years: Team
- 1999 - 2017: Liaoning

National team
- Years: Team
- 2001 - 2016: China

Yuan Zhi (born 29 September 1981 in Shenyang, Liaoning) is a Chinese male volleyball player. He is part of the China men's national volleyball team and won the silver medal at the 2006 Asian Games. He competed for Team China at the 2008 Summer Olympics in Beijing. On club level he plays for Liaoning.
