= Yu Dawei =

Chinese volleyball player (born 1984)

Yu Dawei (Chinese: 于大伟, born 1984-06-21 in Qingdao, Shandong) is a male Chinese volleyball player. He was part of the silver medal winning team at the 2006 Asian Games.

He competed for Team China at the 2008 Summer Olympics in Beijing. He retired from professional clubs and from the national team in June 2012. His last appearance was the 2012 Olympics qualification.
