= Cui Jianjun =

Chinese volleyball player (born 1985)

Personal information
- Full name: Cui Jianjun
- Nationality: Chinese
- Born: August 1, 1985 (age 41); Kaifeng, Henan, People's Republic of China

Cui Jianjun (born 1985-08-01 in Kaifeng, Henan) is a male Chinese volleyball player. He was part of the silver medal winning team at the 2006 Asian Games.

He competed for Team China at the 2008 Summer Olympics in Beijing.
