= Sui Shengsheng =

Chinese volleyball player (born 1980)

Sui Shengsheng (born May 30, 1980, in Anshan) is a Chinese volleyball player. He was part of the silver medal-winning team at the 2006 Asian Games.

He competed for Team China at the 2008 Summer Olympics in Beijing.
