= Shen Qiong =

Chinese volleyball player and coach

Personal information
- Nationality: Chinese
- Born: 5 September 1981 (age 45)
- Home town: Shanghai
- Height: 198 cm (6 ft 6 in)
- Weight: 82 kg (181 lb)
- Spike: 358 cm (141 in)
- Block: 348 cm (137 in)

Coaching information
- Current team: Shanghai Volleyball Club
- Previous teams coached
- Years: Teams
- 2014– 2017 2018 2019–: Shanghai Volleyball Club; China men's team (assistant); China men's team (Team B); China men's team (assistant)

Volleyball information

Career
- Years: Team
- 1999 - 2013: Shanghai Volleyball Club

National team
- Years: Team
- 2001 - 2012: China

Chinese name
- Simplified Chinese: 沈琼
- Traditional Chinese: 沈瓊
- Hanyu Pinyin: Shěn Qióng

Shen Qiong (born September 5, 1981 in Shanghai) is a former male Chinese volleyball player. He was part of the silver medal winning team at the 2006 Asian Games.

He competed for Team China at the 2008 Summer Olympics in Beijing.

He is the head coach of Shanghai Volleyball Club since 2014.
