= Guo Peng =

Chinese volleyball player (born 1982)

Guo Peng (born July 1, 1982, in Taiyuan, Shanxi) is a male Chinese volleyball player. He was part of the silver medal-winning team at the 2006 Asian Games.

He competed for Team China at the 2008 Summer Olympics in Beijing.
