= Shandong Volleyball (men's volleyball) =

Volleyball team

Shandong 山东排球
- Founded: 1956
- Captain: Meng Liu

Shandong Volleyball is a men's volleyball team from Laiwu founded in 1956.

As of 2023, their ranking was 438th in the "Top Men's Volleyball Teams" and 4th in the Chinese Volleyball League.
