= 2022 FIVB Men's Volleyball World Championship statistics =

The final tournament was held in Poland and Slovenia from 26 August to 11 September 2022.

Italy claimed their fourth title, defeating the reigning world champions Poland and Brazil won the third place match, defeating Slovenia in four sets.

== Preliminary round ==
- The top two teams in each pool and the top four of the third placed teams will qualify for the final round.

Qualified for the Final round

=== Combined ranking ===
Pos	Pool	Team	Pld	W	L	Pts	SW	SL	SR	SPW	SPL	SPR	Rank
1	E	Italy	3	3	0	9	9	0	MAX	239	166	1.440	First in each of the pools
2	A	Serbia	3	3	0	9	9	0	MAX	233	187	1.246	First in each of the pools
3	C	Poland	3	3	0	9	9	1	9.000	248	188	1.319	First in each of the pools
4	B	Brazil	3	3	0	8	9	2	4.500	271	222	1.221	First in each of the pools
5	D	France	3	3	0	8	9	2	4.500	273	242	1.128	First in each of the pools
6	F	Netherlands	3	3	0	8	9	3	3.000	286	250	1.144	First in each of the pools
7	D	Slovenia	3	2	1	7	8	3	2.667	260	237	1.097	Second in each of the pools
8	C	United States	3	2	1	6	7	3	2.333	237	215	1.102	Second in each of the pools
9	E	Turkey	3	2	1	6	6	3	2.000	210	186	1.129	Second in each of the pools
10	A	Ukraine	3	2	1	6	6	4	1.500	241	213	1.131	Second in each of the pools
11	B	Japan	3	2	1	6	6	4	1.500	226	205	1.102	Second in each of the pools
12	F	Iran	3	2	1	5	7	6	1.167	313	302	1.036	Second in each of the pools
13	F	Argentina	3	1	2	4	7	8	0.875	351	347	1.012	Third in each of the pools
14	B	Cuba	3	1	2	4	6	7	0.857	281	302	0.930	Third in each of the pools
15	D	Germany	3	1	2	3	3	6	0.500	207	215	0.963	Third in each of the pools
16	A	Tunisia	3	1	2	3	3	6	0.500	189	210	0.900	Third in each of the pools
17	E	Canada	3	1	2	3	3	6	0.500	206	231	0.892	Third in each of the pools
18	C	Mexico	3	1	2	2	3	8	0.375	211	259	0.815	Third in each of the pools
19	F	Egypt	3	0	3	1	3	9	0.333	239	290	0.824	Fourth in each of the pools
20	C	Bulgaria	3	0	3	1	2	9	0.222	228	262	0.870	Fourth in each of the pools
21	B	Qatar	3	0	3	0	1	9	0.111	199	248	0.802	Fourth in each of the pools
22	A	Puerto Rico	3	0	3	0	1	9	0.111	197	250	0.788	Fourth in each of the pools
23	D	Cameroon	3	0	3	0	0	9	0.000	184	230	0.800	Fourth in each of the pools
24	E	China	3	0	3	0	0	9	0.000	153	225	0.680	Fourth in each of the pools

Source: WCH 2022 standings

== Tournament statistics ==
=== Attendance ===
- Matches played : 52
- Attendance (preliminary round) (played 36) : 86,520 (2,403 per match)
- Attendance (final round) (played 16) : 108,092 (6,776 per match)
- Total attendance on tournament : 194,612 (3,743 per match)
- Arena Stožice total attendance (played 30) : 71,038 (2,368 per match)
- Arena Spodek, Katowice, Poland total attendance (played 16) : 83,413 (5,213 per match)
- Arena Gliwice, Gliwice, Poland total attendance (played 6) : 40,161 (6,694 per match)
- Most attendance : 12,258 - Poland v. United States, Gliwice, Gliwice on 8 September 2022.
- Fewest attendance : 90 - Turkey v. China, Arena Stožice, Ljubljana on 27 August 2022.

=== Matches ===
- Most matches wins : 7 - Italy
- Fewest matches wins : 0 - Egypt, Bulgaria, Qatar, Puerto Rico, Cameroon, China
- Most matches lost : 3 - Egypt, Bulgaria, Qatar, Puerto Rico, Cameroon, China
- Fewest matches lost : 0 - Italy
- Most points played in match : 254 - Argentina vs. Iran 2 : 3 (124/130)
- Fewest points played in match : 113 - Italy vs. China 3 : 0 (75/38)
- Longest match played (duration) : 159 min. - Argentina vs. Iran (2h,39m)
- Shortest match played (duration) : 59 min. - Italy vs. China (0h,59m)

=== Sets ===
- Total sets (preliminary round) : 126 (3.5 per match)
- Total sets (final round) : 64 (4.0 per match)
- Total sets scored : 190 (3.65 per match)
- Most sets played : 27 - Poland, Brazil
- Most sets wins : 21 - Italy
- Fewest sets wins : 0 - Cameroon, China
- Most sets lost : 11 - Argentina, Slovenia
- Fewest sets lost : 4 - Italy
- Highest set ratio : 5.250 - Italy (21/4)
- Lowest set ratio : 0.000 - Cameroon, China (0/9)

=== Points ===
- Total points (preliminary round) : 5,682 (158 per match)
- Total points (final round) : 2,834 (177 per match)
- Total points scored : 8,516 (164 per match)
- Most points wins : 641 - Brazil
- Fewest points wins : 153 - China
- Most points lost : 584 - Slovenia
- Fewest points lost : 225 - China
- Highest points ratio : 1.228 - Italy (620/508)
- Lowest points ratio : 0.680 - China (153/225)

== Squads ==
=== Coaches ===
- Oldest coach: Antonio Giacobbe Tunisia – 75 years at the start of the tournament.
- Youngest coach: Michał Winiarski Germany – 38 years at the start of the tournament.

=== Players ===
- Appearance record: Luciano De Cecco Argentina and Marko Podraščanin Serbia participated in the World Championship for the fifth time.
- Oldest player: At 38 years and 61 days, Mitja Gasparini Slovenia is the oldest player ever to be nominated for a 2022 FIVB Men's Volleyball World Championship finals.
- Youngest player: At 17 years and 343 days Mahdi Ben Tahar Tunisia is the youngest player ever to be nominated for a 2022 FIVB Men's Volleyball World Championship finals.
- Tallest player: At 2.15 m (7 ft 0.65 in), Yvan Arthur Kody Bitjaa Cameroon is the tallest player ever to be nominated for a 2022 FIVB Men's Volleyball World Championship finals.
- Shortest player: At 1.70 m (5 ft 7 in), José Roberto Mendoza Perdomo Mexico is the shortest player ever to be nominated for a 2022 FIVB Men's Volleyball World Championship finals.

=== Multiple World Championships ===
Name	(Japan) 2006	(Italy) 2010	(Poland) 2014	(Italy) (Bulgaria) 2018	(Poland) (Slovenia) 2022	Total
(Argentina) Luciano De Cecco	✔					5
(Serbia) Marko Podraščanin	✔					5
(Argentina) Facundo Conte		✔				4
(Brazil) Bruno Rezende		✔				4
(Brazil) Lucas Saatkamp		✔				4
(Bulgaria) Svetoslav Gotsev		✔				4
(Cameroon) Sem Dolegombai		✔				4
(France) Earvin N'Gapeth		✔				4
(Serbia) Nemanja Petrić		✔				4
(Tunisia) Ahmed Kadhi		✔				4
(Tunisia) Hamza Nagga		✔				4
(Argentina) Martín Ramos			✔			3
(Brazil) Wallace de Souza			✔			3
(Bulgaria) Georgi Seganov			✔			3
(Bulgaria) Todor Skrimov			✔			3
(Cameroon) Joseph Kofane Boyomo			✔			3
(Cameroon) Yvan Arthur Kody Bitjaa			✔			3
(Canada) Nicholas Hoag			✔			3
(Canada) Steven Marshall			✔			3
(Cuba) Robertlandy Simón	✔				✔	3
(Cuba) Liván Osoria			✔			3
(Egypt) Hossam Abdalla			✔			3
(France) Benjamin Toniutti			✔			3
(France) Jenia Grebennikov			✔			3
(France) Kévin Tillie			✔			3
(France) Nicolas Le Goff			✔			3
(Iran) Milad Ebadipour			✔			3
(Italy) Simone Anzani			✔			3
(Poland) Grzegorz Łomacz		✔		✔		3
(Poland) Bartosz Kurek		✔		✔		3
(Poland) Paweł Zatorski			✔			3
(Puerto Rico) Dennis Del Valle			✔			3
(Serbia) Aleksandar Atanasijević			✔			3
(Serbia) Marko Ivović			✔			3
(Serbia) Srećko Lisinac			✔			3
(Serbia) Uroš Kovačević			✔			3
(Tunisia) Elyes Karamosli			✔			3
(Tunisia) Mohamed Ali Ben Othmen Miladi			✔			3
(United States) David Smith			✔			3
(United States) Matt Anderson			✔			3
(United States) Micah Christenson			✔			3
(Argentina) Agustín Loser				✔		2
(Argentina) Bruno Lima				✔		2
(Brazil) Thales Hoss				✔		2
(Cameroon) Didier Sali Hilé				✔		2
(Canada) Arthur Szwarc				✔		2
(Canada) Lucas Van Berkel				✔		2
(Canada) Ryan Sclater				✔		2
(Canada) Stephen Maar				✔		2
(China) Miao Ruantong				✔		2
(China) Yu Yaochen				✔		2
(China) Zhang Binglong				✔		2
(China) Zhang Jingyin				✔		2
(Cuba) Adrián Goide				✔		2
(Cuba) Javier Concepción				✔		2
(Cuba) Jesús Herrera				✔		2
(Cuba) Liván Taboada				✔		2
(Cuba) Miguel Gutiérrez				✔		2
(Cuba) Miguel Ángel López				✔		2
(Cuba) Osniel Melgarejo				✔		2
(Cuba) Yonder García				✔		2
(Egypt) Abdelrahman Seoudy				✔		2
(Egypt) Ahmed Shafik				✔		2
(Egypt) Mohamed Masoud				✔		2
(France) Antoine Brizard				✔		2
(France) Barthélémy Chinenyeze				✔		2
(France) Jean Patry				✔		2
(Iran) Amir Hossein Toukhteh				✔		2
(Iran) Mohammad Javad Manavinejad				✔		2
(Iran) Mohammad Reza Hazratpour				✔		2
(Iran) Mohammad Taher Vadi				✔		2
(Iran) Morteza Sharifi				✔		2
(Iran) Saber Kazemi				✔		2
(Italy) Simone Giannelli				✔		2
(Japan) Akihiro Yamauchi				✔		2
(Japan) Masahiro Sekita				✔		2
(Japan) Yuji Nishida				✔		2
(Japan) Yūki Ishikawa				✔		2
(Netherlands) Wessel Keemink				✔		2
(Netherlands) Maarten van Garderen				✔		2
(Netherlands) Thijs ter Horst				✔		2
(Netherlands) Gijs Jorna				✔		2
(Netherlands) Nimir Abdel-Aziz				✔		2
(Netherlands) Wouter ter Maat				✔		2
(Netherlands) Michaël Parkinson				✔		2
(Poland) Aleksander Śliwka				✔		2
(Poland) Bartosz Kwolek				✔		2
(Poland) Jakub Kochanowski				✔		2
(Poland) Mateusz Bieniek				✔		2
(Puerto Rico) Pedro Nieves				✔		2
(Puerto Rico) Jonathan Rodríguez				✔		2
(Slovenia) Alen Pajenk				✔		2
(Slovenia) Dejan Vinčić				✔		2
(Slovenia) Gregor Ropret				✔		2
(Slovenia) Jan Klobučar				✔		2
(Slovenia) Jan Kozamernik				✔		2
(Slovenia) Jani Kovačič				✔		2
(Slovenia) Klemen Čebulj				✔		2
(Slovenia) Mitja Gasparini				✔		2
(Slovenia) Sašo Štalekar				✔		2
(Slovenia) Tine Urnaut				✔		2
(Slovenia) Tonček Štern				✔		2
(Tunisia) Ali Bongui				✔		2
(United States) Aaron Russell				✔		2
(United States) Erik Shoji				✔		2
(United States) Jeffrey Jendryk				✔		2
(United States) Taylor Averill				✔		2

== Final standing ==
Pos	Team	Pld	W	L	Pts	SW	SL	SR	SPW	SPL	SPR	Qualification or relegation
1st place, gold medalist(s)	Italy	7	7	0	20	21	4	5.250	620	508	1.220	Champions
2nd place, silver medalist(s)	Poland	7	6	1	16	19	8	2.375	626	547	1.144	Runners-up
3rd place, bronze medalist(s)	Brazil	7	6	1	18	20	7	2.857	641	556	1.153	Third place
4	Slovenia	7	4	3	13	15	11	1.364	593	584	1.015	Fourth place
5	France	5	4	1	11	14	7	2.000	491	461	1.065	Eliminated in quarterfinals
6	United States	5	3	2	9	12	8	1.500	450	425	1.059	Eliminated in quarterfinals
7	Ukraine	5	3	2	9	10	7	1.429	407	360	1.131	Eliminated in quarterfinals
8	Argentina	5	2	3	7	11	11	1.000	510	512	0.996	Eliminated in quarterfinals
9	Serbia	4	3	1	9	9	3	3.000	300	262	1.145	Eliminated in round of 16
10	Netherlands	4	3	1	8	9	6	1.500	339	325	1.043	Eliminated in round of 16
11	Turkey	4	2	2	7	8	6	1.333	310	292	1.062	Eliminated in round of 16
12	Japan	4	2	2	7	8	7	1.143	333	317	1.050	Eliminated in round of 16
13	Iran	4	2	2	5	7	9	0.778	375	377	0.995	Eliminated in round of 16
14	Cuba	4	1	3	4	7	10	0.700	369	399	0.925	Eliminated in round of 16
15	Germany	4	1	3	3	4	9	0.444	291	311	0.936	Eliminated in round of 16
16	Tunisia	4	1	3	3	3	9	0.333	244	285	0.856	Eliminated in round of 16
17	Canada	3	1	2	3	3	6	0.500	206	231	0.892	Eliminated in preliminary round
18	Mexico	3	1	2	2	3	8	0.375	211	259	0.815	Eliminated in preliminary round
19	Egypt	3	0	3	1	3	9	0.333	239	290	0.824	Eliminated in preliminary round
20	Bulgaria	3	0	3	1	2	9	0.222	228	262	0.870	Eliminated in preliminary round
21	Qatar	3	0	3	0	1	9	0.111	199	248	0.802	Eliminated in preliminary round
22	Puerto Rico	3	0	3	0	1	9	0.111	197	250	0.788	Eliminated in preliminary round
23	Cameroon	3	0	3	0	0	9	0.000	184	230	0.800	Eliminated in preliminary round
24	China	3	0	3	0	0	9	0.000	153	225	0.680	Eliminated in preliminary round

Source: WCH 2022 final standings

== Statistics leaders ==
Statistics leaders correct as of final round.

Best Scorers
	Player	Spikes	Blocks	Serves	Total
1	(Brazil) Yoandy Leal	107	8	10	125
2	(Slovenia) Klemen Čebulj	95	13	6	114
3	(Italy) Daniele Lavia	91	10	2	103
4	(Poland) Bartosz Kurek	85	7	8	100
5	(Brazil) Wallace de Souza	85	9	3	97

Best Spikers
	Player	Spikes	Faults	Shots	%	Total
1	(Brazil) Yoandy Leal	107	24	72	52.61	203
2	(Slovenia) Klemen Čebulj	95	26	90	45.02	211
3	(Italy) Daniele Lavia	91	22	59	52.91	172
4	(Brazil) Wallace de Souza	85	31	57	49.13	173
5	(Poland) Bartosz Kurek	85	30	54	50.30	169

Best Blockers
	Player	Blocks	Faults	Rebounds	Avg	Total
1	(Argentina) Agustín Loser	17	30	2	3.40	49
2	(Brazil) Lucas Saatkamp	16	30	4	2.29	50
3	(Brazil) Flávio Gualberto	16	28	4	2.29	48
4	(Poland) Mateusz Bieniek	16	31	13	2.29	60
5	(Slovenia) Jan Kozamernik	15	29	8	2.14	52

Best Servers
	Player	Aces	Faults	Hits	Avg	Total
1	(Ukraine) Oleh Plotnytskyi	18	16	48	3.60	82
2	(Netherlands) Nimir Abdel-Aziz	12	27	35	3.00	74
3	(Poland) Mateusz Bieniek	11	16	78	1.57	105
4	(Brazil) Yoandy Leal	10	20	61	1.43	91
5	(Poland) Kamil Semeniuk	10	22	68	1.43	100

Best Setters
	Player	Running	Faults	Still	Avg	Total
1	(Italy) Simone Giannelli	139	3	376	19.86	518
2	(Argentina) Luciano De Cecco	131	3	314	26.20	448
3	(France) Antoine Brizard	107	3	286	21.40	396
4	(Poland) Marcin Janusz	94	3	428	13.43	525
5	(Germany) Lukas Kampa	87	0	187	21.75	274

Best Diggers
	Player	Digs	Faults	Receptions	Avg	Total
1	(Brazil) Thales Hoss	59	12	7	8.43	78
2	(Poland) Paweł Zatorski	52	15	6	7.43	73
3	(Italy) Fabio Balaso	48	19	11	6.68	78
4	(Slovenia) Jani Kovačič	39	17	5	5.57	61
5	(Argentina) Santiago Danani	30	10	4	6.00	44

Best Receivers
	Player	Excellents	Faults	Serve	%	Total
1	(Argentina) Santiago Danani	39	11	90	27.86	140
2	(France) Earvin N'Gapeth	35	1	74	31.82	110
3	(Netherlands) Robbert Andringa	34	3	49	39.53	86
4	(Argentina) Facundo Conte	34	3	81	28.81	118
5	(Brazil) Thales Hoss	33	6	87	26.19	126

== Awards ==
- Most valuable player

Simone Giannelli (ITA)

- Best setter

Simone Giannelli (ITA)

- Best outside spikers

Yoandy Leal (BRA)
Kamil Semeniuk (POL)

- Best opposite spiker

Bartosz Kurek (POL)

- Best middle blockers

Mateusz Bieniek (POL)
Gianluca Galassi (ITA)

- Best libero

Fabio Balaso (ITA)

== See also ==
- 2018 FIVB Men's Volleyball World Championship statistics
- FIVB Men's Volleyball Nations League statistics
- FIVB Volleyball Women's Nations League statistics
- Volleyball records and statistics
- Major achievements in volleyball by nation
- List of indoor volleyball world medalists
