= 2022 FIVB Men's Volleyball World Championship squads =

This article shows the 14-player roster of all participating teams at the 2022 FIVB Men's Volleyball World Championship.

== Pool A ==
=== Ukraine ===
The following is Ukraine‘s roster for the 2022 FIVB Men's Volleyball World Championship.

Head coach: (Latvia) Uģis Krastiņš

- 1 Timofii Poluian OH
- 2 Maksym Drozd MB
- 4 Oleh Shevchenko OH
- 5 Oleh Plotnytskyi OH
- 7 Horden Brova L
- 9 Volodymyr Ostapenko MB
- 10 Yurii Semeniuk MB
- 12 Denys Fomin OH
- 13 Vasyl Tupchii OP
- 14 Illia Kovalov OH
- 15 Vitalii Shchytkov S
- 19 Dmytro Kanaiev L
- 21 Yevhenii Kisiliuk OH
- 22 Yurii Synytsia S

=== Serbia ===
The following is Serbia‘s roster for the 2022 FIVB Men's Volleyball World Championship.

Head coach: (Montenegro) Igor Kolaković

- 2 Uroš Kovačević OH
- 4 Nemanja Petrić OH
- 5 Milan Katić L
- 6 Nikola Peković L
- 7 Petar Krsmanović MB
- 8 Marko Ivović OH
- 9 Nikola Jovović S
- 12 Pavle Perić OH
- 14 Aleksandar Atanasijević OP
- 15 Nemanja Mašulović MB
- 18 Marko Podraščanin MB
- 20 Srećko Lisinac MB
- 21 Vuk Todorović S
- 33 Dušan Petković OP

=== Tunisia ===
The following is Tunisia's roster for the 2022 FIVB Men's Volleyball World Championship.

Head coach: (Italy) Antonio Giacobbe

- 2 Ahmed Kadhi MB
- 3 Khaled Ben Slimene S
- 6 Mohamed Ali Ben Othmen Miladi OH
- 7 Elyes Karamosli OH
- 8 Yassine Abdelhedi OH
- 9 Omar Agrebi MB
- 10 Hamza Nagga OP
- 12 Rami Bennour S
- 13 Selim Mbareki MB
- 16 Mehdi Ben Tahar MB
- 18 Ali Bongui OP
- 19 Aymen Bouguerra OH
- 20 Saddem Hmissi L
- 21 Taieb Korbosli L

=== Puerto Rico ===
The following is Puerto Rico's roster for the 2022 FIVB Men's Volleyball World Championship.

Head coach: (Puerto Rico) Ossie Antonetti

- 2 Klistan Lawrence MB
- 3 Omar Hoyos OH
- 4 Dennis Del Valle L
- 5 Pedro Nieves MB
- 6 Gregory Torres Cruzado OP
- 7 Arturo Iglesias S
- 8 Kevin López OH
- 9 Pedro Molina OH
- 12 Arnel Cabrera L
- 13 Roque Nido S
- 14 Pelegrín Vargas OH
- 15 Jonathan Rodríguez MB
- 17 Ismael Alomar MB
- 18 Antonio Elias MB

== Pool B ==
=== Brazil ===
The following is Brazil's roster for the 2022 FIVB Men's Volleyball World Championship.

Head coach: (Brazil) Renan Dal Zotto

- 1 Bruno Rezende S
- 6 Adriano Cavalcante OH
- 8 Wallace de Souza OP
- 9 Yoandy Leal OH
- 11 Rodrigo Leão OH
- 14 Fernando Kreling S
- 15 Maique Nascimento L
- 16 Lucas Saatkamp MB
- 17 Thales Hoss L
- 18 Ricardo Lucarelli OH
- 19 Leandro Santos MB
- 21 Felipe Roque OP
- 23 Flávio Gualberto MB
- 28 Darlan Souza OP

=== Japan ===
The following is Japan's roster for the 2022 FIVB Men's Volleyball World Championship.

Head coach: (France) Philippe Blain

- 1 Yuji Nishida OP
- 2 Taishi Onodera MB
- 5 Tatsunori Otsuka OH
- 6 Akihiro Yamauchi MB
- 7 Kenta Takanashi OH
- 8 Masahiro Sekita S
- 9 Masaki Oya S
- 12 Ran Takahashi OH
- 13 Tomohiro Ogawa L
- 14 Yuki Ishikawa OH
- 16 Kento Miyaura OP
- 20 Tomohiro Yamamoto L
- 23 Shunichiro Sato MB
- 26 Go Murayama MB

=== Cuba ===
The following is Cuba's roster for the 2022 FIVB Men's Volleyball World Championship.

Head coach: (Cuba) Nicolas Vives

- 2 Osniel Melgarejo OH
- 4 Michael Sánchez OP
- 5 Javier Concepción MB
- 7 Yonder García L
- 9 Liván Osoria MB
- 10 Miguel Gutiérrez OP
- 11 Liván Taboada S
- 12 Jesús Herrera OP
- 13 Robertlandy Simón MB
- 14 Adrián Goide S
- 18 Miguel Ángel López OH
- 22 José Miguel Gutiérrez OH
- 23 Marlon Yant OH
- 24 Alain Gourguet L

=== Qatar ===
The following is Qatar's roster for the 2022 FIVB Men's Volleyball World Championship.

Head coach: (Argentina) Camilo Andres Soto

- 1 Youssef Oughlaf OP
- 3 Ahmed Mahmoud Assam L
- 4 Renan Ribeiro OH
- 5 Sulaiman Saad L
- 6 Bojan Djukic OH
- 7 Belal Nabel Abunabot MB
- 9 Miloš Stevanović S
- 10 Nadir Ababacar Sadikh OH
- 11 Nikola Vasić OH
- 12 Mubarak Dahi OP
- 14 Abdullah Hassanein S
- 16 Ibrahim Ibrahim MB
- 17 Gamal Ahmed Noaman MB
- 21 Abdulwahid Wagihalla Osman MB

== Pool C ==
=== Poland ===
The following is Poland's roster for the 2022 FIVB Men's Volleyball World Championship.

Head coach: (Serbia) Nikola Grbić

- 3 Jakub Popiwczak L
- 5 Łukasz Kaczmarek OP
- 6 Bartosz Kurek OP
- 7 Karol Kłos MB
- 12 Grzegorz Łomacz S
- 14 Aleksander Śliwka OH
- 15 Jakub Kochanowski MB
- 16 Kamil Semeniuk OH
- 17 Paweł Zatorski L
- 18 Bartosz Kwolek OH
- 19 Marcin Janusz S
- 20 Mateusz Bieniek MB
- 21 Tomasz Fornal OH
- 72 Mateusz Poręba MB

=== United States ===
The following is United States' roster for the 2022 FIVB Men's Volleyball World Championship.

Head coach: (United States) John Speraw

- 1 Matt Anderson OP
- 2 Aaron Russell OH
- 4 Jeffrey Jendryk MB
- 5 Kyle Ensing OP
- 8 Torey DeFalco OH
- 11 Micah Christenson S
- 15 Kyle Russell OP
- 16 Joshua Tuaniga S
- 18 Garrett Muagututia OH
- 19 Taylor Averill MB
- 20 David Smith MB
- 21 Mason Briggs L
- 22 Erik Shoji L
- 23 Cody Kessel OH

=== Mexico ===
The following is Mexico's roster for the 2022 FIVB Men's Volleyball World Championship.

Head coach: (Mexico) Jorge Azair

- 1 José Mendoza Perdomo L
- 3 Hiram Bravo Moreno L
- 4 Raynel Ferrán Romero OH
- 6 Josué López Ríos OH
- 7 Diego González Castañeda OP
- 8 Edgar Mendoza Burgueño S
- 9 Axel Téllez Rodríguez MB
- 12 Mauro Fuentes Rascón OH
- 14 Jonathan Martínez García MB
- 15 Christian Aranda S
- 16 Miguel Chávez Pasos MB
- 18 Yasutaka Sanay Heredia OH
- 20 Luis Hernández Baca OP
- 21 Brandon López Ríos MB

=== Bulgaria ===
The following is Bulgaria's roster for the 2022 FIVB Men's Volleyball World Championship.

Head coach: (Bulgaria) Nikolay Jeliazkov

- 1 Denis Karyagin OP
- 2 Stefan Chavdarov MB
- 3 Nikolay Kolev MB
- 4 Martin Atanasov OH
- 5 Svetoslav Gotsev MB
- 7 Dobromir Dimitrov S
- 8 Todor Skrimov OH
- 9 Georgi Seganov S
- 11 Aleks Grozdanov MB
- 14 Asparuh Asparuhov OH
- 16 Vladislav Ivanov L
- 18 Svetoslav Ivanov OH
- 19 Tsvetan Sokolov OP
- 23 Aleksandar Nikolov OH

== Pool D ==
=== France ===
The following is France's roster for the 2022 FIVB Men's Volleyball World Championship.

Head coach: (Italy) Andrea Giani

- 1 Barthélémy Chinenyeze MB
- 2 Jenia Grebennikov L
- 4 Jean Patry OP
- 6 Benjamin Toniutti S
- 7 Kévin Tillie OH
- 9 Earvin N'Gapeth OH
- 11 Antoine Brizard S
- 12 Stéphen Boyer OP
- 14 Nicolas Le Goff MB
- 15 Médéric Henry MB
- 17 Trévor Clévenot OH
- 19 Yacine Louati OH
- 20 Benjamin Diez L
- 25 Quentin Jouffroy MB

=== Slovenia ===
The following is Slovenia's roster for the 2022 FIVB Men's Volleyball World Championship.

Head coach: (Romania) Gheorghe Crețu

- 1 Tonček Štern OP
- 2 Alen Pajenk MB
- 4 Jan Kozamernik MB
- 6 Mitja Gasparini OP
- 9 Dejan Vinčić S
- 10 Sašo Štalekar MB
- 11 Danijel Koncilja MB
- 12 Jan Klobučar L
- 13 Jani Kovačič L
- 14 Žiga Štern OH
- 16 Gregor Ropret S
- 17 Tine Urnaut OH
- 18 Klemen Čebulj OH
- 19 Rok Možič OH

=== Germany ===
The following is Germany's roster for the 2022 FIVB Men's Volleyball World Championship.

Head coach: (Poland) Michał Winiarski

- 1 Christian Fromm OH
- 3 Ruben Schott OH
- 5 Moritz Reichert OH
- 7 David Sossenheimer L
- 10 Julian Zenger L
- 11 Lukas Kampa S
- 14 Moritz Karlitzek OH
- 17 Jan Zimmermann S
- 18 Florian Krage MB
- 20 Linus Weber OP
- 21 Tobias Krick MB
- 22 Tobias Brand OH
- 25 Lukas Maase MB
- 45 Jakob Günthör MB

=== Cameroon ===
The following is Cameroon's roster for the 2022 FIVB Men's Volleyball World Championship.

Head coach: (Cameroon) Guy-Roger Nanga

- 1 Elie Badawe Djakode OP
- 2 Ahmed Awal S
- 3 Arnaud Amabaya S
- 5 Joseph Kofane Boyomo MB
- 6 Sem Dolegombai MB
- 8 Christophe Mandeng Adjessa MB
- 9 Cedric Bitouna OH
- 10 Didier Sali Hile OH
- 11 Jeremie Deffo Sobwen OH
- 12 Kevin Bassoko L
- 14 Yaoussi Kavogo OH
- 15 Yvan Kody Bitjaa OP
- 18 Nelson Djam L
- 20 Christian Voukeng Mbativou MB

== Pool E ==
=== Italy ===
The following is Italy's roster for the 2022 FIVB Men's Volleyball World Championship.

Head coach: (Italy) Ferdinando De Giorgi

- 1 Giulio Pinali OP
- 3 Francesco Recine OH
- 5 Alessandro Michieletto OH
- 6 Simone Giannelli S
- 7 Fabio Balaso L
- 8 Riccardo Sbertoli S
- 12 Mattia Bottolo OH
- 14 Gianluca Galassi MB
- 15 Daniele Lavia OH
- 16 Yuri Romanò OP
- 17 Simone Anzani MB
- 19 Roberto Russo MB
- 24 Leonardo Scanferla L
- 30 Leandro Mosca MB

=== Canada ===
The following is Canada's roster for the 2022 FIVB Men's Volleyball World Championship.

Head coach: (Canada) Ben Josephson

- 3 Derek Epp S
- 4 Nicholas Hoag OH
- 5 Eric Loeppky OH
- 7 Stephen Timothy Maar OH
- 8 Brett Walsh S
- 10 Ryan Sclater OP
- 11 Pearson Eshenko MB
- 12 Lucas Van Berkel MB
- 17 Ryley Barnes OH
- 19 Brodie Hofer OH
- 20 Arthur Szwarc OP
- 21 Jackson Howe MB
- 22 Steven Marshall L
- 24 Mathias Elser L

=== Turkey ===
The following is Turkey's roster for the 2022 FIVB Men's Volleyball World Championship.

Head coach: (Turkey) Nedim Özbey

- 3 Metin Toy OP
- 5 Baturalp Burak Güngör OH
- 6 Arda Bostan S
- 8 Burutay Subaşı OH
- 9 Mirza Lagumdzija OP
- 10 Arslan Ekşi S
- 12 Adis Lagumdzija OP
- 14 Faik Samet Güneş MB
- 19 Berkay Bayraktar L
- 24 Ahmet Tümer MB
- 25 Kaan Gürbüz OP
- 53 Volkan Döne L
- 66 Doğukan Ulu MB
- 77 Bedirhan Bülbül MB

=== China ===
The following is China's roster for the 2022 FIVB Men's Volleyball World Championship.

Head coach: (China) Wu Sheng

- 1 Dai Qingyao OH
- 4 Yang Yiming L
- 5 Zhang Binglong OH
- 6 Yu Yuantai OH
- 7 Yu Yaochen S
- 8 Yang Tianyuan L
- 9 Li Yongzhen MB
- 10 Liu Meng S
- 12 Zhang Zhejia MB
- 15 Peng Shikun MB
- 19 Zhang Guanhua OP
- 21 Miao Ruantong MB
- 22 Zhang Jingyin OH
- 27 Wang Bin OH

== Pool F ==
=== Argentina ===
The following is Argentina's roster for the 2022 FIVB Men's Volleyball World Championship.

Head coach: (Argentina) Marcelo Méndez

- 1 Matías Sánchez S
- 3 Jan Martínez Franchi L
- 4 Joaquín Gallego MB
- 7 Facundo Conte OH
- 8 Agustín Loser MB
- 9 Santiago Danani L
- 12 Bruno Lima OP
- 13 Ezequiel Palacios OH
- 15 Luciano De Cecco S
- 16 Luciano Palonsky OH
- 17 Luciano Vicentín OH
- 18 Martín Ramos MB
- 22 Nicolás Zerba MB
- 25 Pablo Koukartsev OP

=== Iran ===
The following is Iran's roster for the 2022 FIVB Men's Volleyball World Championship.

Head coach: (Iran) Behrouz Ataei

- 1 Mahdi Jelveh MB
- 2 Milad Ebadipour OH
- 5 Amir Hossein Toukhteh MB
- 7 Shahrooz Homayonfarmanesh OH
- 8 Mohammad Reza Hazratpour L
- 9 Mohammadreza Moazzen L
- 11 Saber Kazemi OP
- 12 Amirhossein Esfandiar OH
- 14 Mohammad Javad Manavinejad OH
- 15 Aliasghar Mojarad MB
- 17 Amin Esmaeilnejad OP
- 18 Mohammad Taher Vadi S
- 24 Javad Karimisouchelmaei S
- 49 Morteza Sharifi OH

=== Netherlands ===
The following is Netherlands's roster for the 2022 FIVB Men's Volleyball World Championship.

Head coach: (Italy) Roberto Piazza

- 2 Wessel Keemink S
- 3 Maarten van Garderen OH
- 4 Thijs ter Horst OH
- 5 Luuc van der Ent MB
- 7 Gijs Jorna OH
- 8 Fabian Plak MB
- 12 Bennie Tuinstra OH
- 13 Mats Bleeker L
- 14 Nimir Abdel-Aziz OP
- 16 Wouter ter Maat OP
- 17 Michaël Parkinson MB
- 18 Robbert Andringa L
- 19 Freek de Weijer S
- 22 Twan Wiltenburg MB

=== Egypt ===
The following is Egypt's roster for the 2022 FIVB Men's Volleyball World Championship.

Head coach: (Egypt) Hassan Elhossary

- 1 Ahmed El Sayed S
- 5 Abdelrahman Seoudy MB
- 6 Mohamed Hassan L
- 8 Abdelrahman Elhossiny Eissa OH
- 10 Mohamed Masoud MB
- 11 Mohamed Noureldin L
- 12 Hossam Abdalla S
- 13 Mohamed Khater MB
- 15 Ahmed Elkotb OP
- 17 Reda Haikal OP
- 18 Ahmed Shafik OH
- 22 Mohamed Moustafa Issa OH
- 23 Ahmed Omar OH
- 25 Mohamed Magdi Ali MB

== See also ==
- 2022 FIVB Volleyball Women's World Championship squads
