= 2019 Men's NORCECA Volleyball Championship =

International volleyball competition held in Canada, Winnipeg in the year 2019

2019 Men's NORCECA Championship

Tournament details
- Host country: Canada
- City: Winnipeg
- Dates: 2–7 September
- Teams: 7 (from 1 confederation)
- Venue: 1 (in 1 host city)

Final positions
- Champions: Cuba (16th title)
- Runners-up: United States
- Third place: Canada
- Fourth place: Mexico

Tournament awards
- MVP: (Cuba) Miguel Ángel López
- Best Setter: (Puerto Rico) Luis Garcìa
- Best OH: (United States) Torey Defalco (Canada) Stephen Maar
- Best MB: (Cuba) Roamy Alonso (United States) Jeffrey Jendryk
- Best OPP: (Puerto Rico) Maurice Torres
- Best Libero: (United States) Kyle Dagostino

Tournament statistics
- Matches played: 17
- Best scorer: (Dominican Republic) Henry Tapia (107 points)
- Best server: (Cuba) Osniel Melgarejo (0.80 Avg)
- Best digger: (United States) Kyle Dagostino (1.00 Avg)
- Best receiver: (Mexico) Jesús Rangel (53.09%)

The 2019 Men's NORCECA Volleyball Championship was the 26th edition of the tournament, and was held in Winnipeg, Canada from 2 to 7 September 2019. Top four teams which had not yet qualified to the 2020 Summer Olympics or the 2020 North American Olympic Qualification Tournament qualified for the 2020 North American Olympic Qualification Tournament.

== Qualification ==
The hosts Canada and the top seven ranked teams from the NORCECA Ranking as of 1 January 2019 qualified for the tournament. But, Suriname replaced Trinidad and Tobago, who withdrew from the tournament. And, Suriname withdrew just before the beginning of the tournament. Rankings are shown in brackets except the hosts who ranked 2nd.

- Canada (Hosts)
- United States (1)
- Cuba (3)
- Puerto Rico (4)
- Mexico (5)
- Dominican Republic (6)
- Guatemala (7)
- ~~Trinidad and Tobago (8)~~
- ~~Suriname (13)~~

== Pools composition ==
Teams were seeded following the serpentine system according to their NORCECA Ranking as of 1 January 2019. NORCECA reserved the right to seed the hosts as head of pool A regardless of the NORCECA Ranking.

Pool A	Pool B
Canada	United States
Puerto Rico	Cuba
Mexico	Dominican Republic
	Guatemala

== Venue ==
- Duckworth Centre, Winnipeg, Canada

== Pool standing procedure ==
1. Number of matches won
2. Match points
3. Points ratio
4. Sets ratio
5. Result of the last match between the tied teams

Match won 3–0: 5 match points for the winner, 0 match points for the loser
Match won 3–1: 4 match points for the winner, 1 match point for the loser
Match won 3–2: 3 match points for the winner, 2 match points for the loser

== Preliminary round ==
- All times are Central Daylight Time (UTC−05:00).

=== Pool A ===
Pos	Team	Pld	W	L	Pts	SPW	SPL	SPR	SW	SL	SR	Qualification
1	Canada	2	2	0	10	150	101	1.485	6	0	MAX	Semifinals
2	Mexico	2	1	1	5	120	141	0.851	3	3	1.000	Quarterfinals
3	Puerto Rico	2	0	2	0	125	153	0.817	0	6	0.000	Quarterfinals

Date	Time		Score		Set 1	Set 2	Set 3	Set 4	Set 5	Total	Report
2 Sep	15:07	Mexico	3–0	Puerto Rico	28–26	25–18	25–22			78–66	P2 P3
3 Sep	20:00	Canada	3–0	Mexico	25–10	25–17	25–15			75–42	P2 P3
4 Sep	20:00	Canada	3–0	Puerto Rico	25–20	25–18	25–21			75–59	P2 P3

=== Pool B ===
Pos	Team	Pld	W	L	Pts	SPW	SPL	SPR	SW	SL	SR	Qualification
1	United States	3	3	0	15	226	172	1.314	9	0	MAX	Semifinals
2	Cuba	3	2	1	10	222	189	1.175	6	3	2.000	Quarterfinals
3	Dominican Republic	3	1	2	4	201	241	0.834	3	7	0.429	Quarterfinals
4	Guatemala	3	0	3	1	220	267	0.824	1	9	0.111	6th place match

Date	Time		Score		Set 1	Set 2	Set 3	Set 4	Set 5	Total	Report
2 Sep	13:00	Guatemala	0–3	Cuba	13–25	35–37	14–25			62–87	P2 P3
2 Sep	18:00	United States	3–0	Dominican Republic	25–14	25–17	25–14			75–45	P2 P3
3 Sep	15:00	Guatemala	0–3	United States	22–25	21–25	24–26			67–76	P2 P3
3 Sep	18:00	Cuba	3–0	Dominican Republic	25–20	25–17	25–15			75–52	P2 P3
4 Sep	15:00	Dominican Republic	3–1	Guatemala	29–27	25–19	25–27	25–18		104–91	P2 P3
4 Sep	18:00	United States	3–0	Cuba	25–17	25–21	25–22			75–60	P2 P3

== Final round ==
- All times are Central Daylight Time (UTC−05:00).

Quarterfinals
5 September
Cuba	3
Puerto Rico	0
5 September
Mexico	3
Dominican Republic	1

Semifinals
6 September
Canada	1
Cuba	3
6 September
United States	3
Mexico	0

Final
7 September
Cuba	3
United States	1
3rd place match
7 September
Canada	3
Mexico	0

6th place match
7 September
Dominican Republic	3
Guatemala	1

5th place match
6 September
Dominican Republic	2
Puerto Rico	3

=== Quarterfinals ===
Date	Time		Score		Set 1	Set 2	Set 3	Set 4	Set 5	Total	Report
5 Sep	18:00	Mexico	3–1	Dominican Republic	25–19	25–21	17–25	25–17		92–82	P2 P3
5 Sep	20:30	Cuba	3–0	Puerto Rico	25–21	25–22	28–26			78–69	P2 P3

=== 5th place match ===
Date	Time		Score		Set 1	Set 2	Set 3	Set 4	Set 5	Total	Report
6 Sep	15:00	Dominican Republic	2–3	Puerto Rico	25–23	14–25	25–21	23–25	6–15	93–109	P2 P3

=== Semifinals ===
Date	Time		Score		Set 1	Set 2	Set 3	Set 4	Set 5	Total	Report
6 Sep	18:00	Canada	1–3	Cuba	25–17	22–25	22–25	19–25		88–92	P2 P3
6 Sep	20:31	United States	3–0	Mexico	25–18	25–16	25–23			75–57	P2 P3

=== 6th place match ===
Date	Time		Score		Set 1	Set 2	Set 3	Set 4	Set 5	Total	Report
7 Sep	11:00	Dominican Republic	3–1	Guatemala	28–30	25–13	28–26	25–19		106–88	P2 P3

=== 3rd place match ===
Date	Time		Score		Set 1	Set 2	Set 3	Set 4	Set 5	Total	Report
7 Sep	14:00	Canada	3–0	Mexico	25–14	25–18	25–12			75–44	P2 P3

=== Final ===
Date	Time		Score		Set 1	Set 2	Set 3	Set 4	Set 5	Total	Report
7 Sep	16:00	Cuba	3–1	United States	25–18	21–25	25–20	25–20		96–83	P2 P3

== Final standing ==
Rank	Team
1st place, gold medalist(s)	Cuba
2nd place, silver medalist(s)	United States
3rd place, bronze medalist(s)	Canada
4	Mexico
5	Puerto Rico
6	Dominican Republic
7	Guatemala

Qualified for the 2020 North American Olympic Qualifier
Already qualified for the 2020 North American Olympic Qualifier via the 2019 Champions Cup
Already qualified for the 2020 Summer Olympics via the 2019 Intercontinental Olympic Qualifier

2019 Men's NORCECA champions

Cuba
16th title

9–man roster
Masso, Melgarejo, Yant, Concepción, García, Simón, Goide, Alonso (c), López
Head coach
Muñoz

== Awards ==
- Most valuable player
  (Cuba) Miguel Ángel López
- Best scorer
  (Dominican Republic) Henry Tapia
- Best server
  (Cuba) Osniel Melgarejo
- Best digger
  (United States) Kyle Dagostino
- Best receiver
  (Mexico) Jesús Rangel
- Best setter
  (Puerto Rico) Luis Garcìa
- Best outside spikers
  (United States) Torey DeFalco
  (Canada) Stephen Maar
- Best middle blockers
  (Cuba) Roamy Alonso
  (United States) Jeffrey Jendryk
- Best opposite spiker
  (Puerto Rico) Maurice Torres
- Best libero
  (United States) Kyle Dagostino

== See also ==
- 2019 Women's NORCECA Volleyball Championship
