= Volleyball at the 2020 Summer Olympics – Men's qualification =

2020 Volleyball at the Summer Olympics – Men's qualification
- Dates: 9 August 2019 – 12 January 2020
- Teams: 42 (from 5 confederations)

The qualification for the 2020 men's Olympic volleyball tournament allocated twelve teams quota spots: the hosts, the winners in each of the six pools of Intercontinental Qualifying Tournament, and five continental Olympic qualification tournament winners. Teams already qualified for the event are not eligible to play in the following qualification tournaments. The 2020 Summer Olympics were postponed to 2021 due to the COVID-19 pandemic.

== Qualification summary ==
Event		Dates	Venue(s)	Quota	Qualifier(s)
Host nation		—N/a		1	Japan
Intercontinental Qualifier	Pool A	9–11 August 2019	(Bulgaria) Varna	1	Brazil
Intercontinental Qualifier	Pool B	9–11 August 2019	(Netherlands) Rotterdam	1	United States
Intercontinental Qualifier	Pool C	9–11 August 2019	(Italy) Bari	1	Italy
Intercontinental Qualifier	Pool D	9–11 August 2019	(Poland) Gdańsk–Sopot	1	Poland
Intercontinental Qualifier	Pool E	9–11 August 2019	(Russia) Saint Petersburg	1	(Russia) ROC
Intercontinental Qualifier	Pool F	9–11 August 2019	(China) Ningbo	1	Argentina
European Qualifier		5–10 January 2020	(Germany) Berlin	1	France
Asian Qualifier		7–12 January 2020	(China) Jiangmen	1	Iran
African Qualifier		7–11 January 2020	(Egypt) Cairo	1	Tunisia
South American Qualifier		10–12 January 2020	(Chile) Mostazal	1	Venezuela
North American Qualifier		10–12 January 2020	(Canada) Vancouver	1	Canada
Total				12	

== Timeline ==
Confederation	Tournament		Date	Venue	Teams
FIVB (Intercontinental)	Intercontinental Olympic Qualifier	Pool A	9–11 August 2019	(Bulgaria) Varna	4
FIVB (Intercontinental)	Intercontinental Olympic Qualifier	Pool B	9–11 August 2019	(Netherlands) Rotterdam	4
FIVB (Intercontinental)	Intercontinental Olympic Qualifier	Pool C	9–11 August 2019	(Italy) Bari	4
FIVB (Intercontinental)	Intercontinental Olympic Qualifier	Pool D	9–11 August 2019	(Poland) Gdańsk–Sopot	4
FIVB (Intercontinental)	Intercontinental Olympic Qualifier	Pool E	9–11 August 2019	(Russia) Saint Petersburg	4
FIVB (Intercontinental)	Intercontinental Olympic Qualifier	Pool F	9–11 August 2019	(China) Ningbo	4
CAVB (Africa)	African Olympic Qualifier		7–11 January 2020	(Egypt) Cairo	5
AVC (Asia and Oceania)	Asian Championship Western Asia Qualifier		17–21 July 2019	(Oman) Muscat	3
AVC (Asia and Oceania)	Asian Championship		13–21 September 2019	(Iran) Tehran	15+1
AVC (Asia and Oceania)	Asian Olympic Qualifier		7–12 January 2020	(China) Jiangmen	8
CEV (Europe)	European Olympic Qualifier		5–10 January 2020	(Germany) Berlin	8
NORCECA (North America)	NORCECA Champions Cup		22–24 August 2019	(United States) Colorado Springs	4
NORCECA (North America)	NORCECA Championship		2–7 September 2019	(Canada) Winnipeg	5+1+1
NORCECA (North America)	North American Olympic Qualifier		10–12 January 2020	(Canada) Vancouver	4
CSV (South America)	South American Championship		10–14 September 2019	(Chile) Mostazal	6+2
CSV (South America)	South American Olympic Qualifier		10–12 January 2020	(Chile) Mostazal	4

== Pool standing procedure ==
For all qualification tournaments except North American qualification tournament

1. Total number of victories (matches won, matches lost)
2. In the event of a tie, the following first tiebreaker will apply: The teams will be ranked by the most points gained per match as follows:
  - Match won 3–0 or 3–1: 3 points for the winner, 0 points for the loser
  - Match won 3–2: 2 points for the winner, 1 point for the loser
  - Match forfeited: 3 points for the winner, 0 points (0–25, 0–25, 0–25) for the loser
3. If teams are still tied after examining the number of victories and points gained, then the FIVB will examine the results in order to break the tie in the following order:
  - Sets quotient: if two or more teams are tied on the number of points gained, they will be ranked by the quotient resulting from the division of the number of all sets won by the number of all sets lost.
  - Points quotient: if the tie persists based on the sets quotient, the teams will be ranked by the quotient resulting from the division of all points scored by the total of points lost during all sets.
  - If the tie persists based on the points quotient, the tie will be broken based on the team that won the match of the Round Robin Phase between the tied teams. When the tie in points quotient is between three or more teams, these teams ranked taking into consideration only the matches involving the teams in question.

For North American qualification tournament only

1. Total number of victories (matches won, matches lost)
2. In the event of a tie, the following first tiebreaker will apply: The teams will be ranked by the most points gained per match as follows:
  - Match won 3–0: 5 points for the winner, 0 points for the loser
  - Match won 3–1: 4 points for the winner, 1 point for the loser
  - Match won 3–2: 3 points for the winner, 2 point for the loser
  - Match forfeited: 5 points for the winner, 0 points (0–25, 0–25, 0–25) for the loser
3. If teams are still tied after examining the number of victories and points gained, then the NORCECA will examine the results in order to break the tie in the following order:
  - Points quotient: if two or more teams are tied on the number of points gained, they will be ranked by the quotient resulting from the division of all points scored by the total of points lost during all sets.
  - Sets quotient: if the tie persists based on the points quotient, the teams will be ranked by the quotient resulting from the division of the number of all sets won by the number of all sets lost.
  - If the tie persists based on the sets quotient, the tie will be broken based on the team that won the match of the Round Robin Phase between the tied teams. When the tie in sets quotient is between three or more teams, these teams ranked taking into consideration only the matches involving the teams in question.

== Host country ==
FIVB reserved a berth for the 2020 Summer Olympics host country to participate in the tournament.

- Japan

== Intercontinental Olympic Qualification Tournaments ==
- The winners in each pool qualified for the 2020 Summer Olympics.

=== Qualification round ===
Twenty-four teams qualified for the competition as the top twenty-four teams of FIVB World Ranking on 1 October 2018 (except Japan who qualified as hosts for the 2020 Summer Olympics.).

Qualified for the 2019 Intercontinental Olympic Qualifier
Already qualified as hosts for the 2020 Summer Olympics

Seeding	Team	WC 2015	OG 2016	WL 2017	WCH 2018	Total
1	Brazil	80	100	45	90	315
2	United States	100	80	40	80	300
3	Italy	90	90	24	62	266
4	Poland	80	50	32	100	262
5	Russia	70	70	38	56	234
6	Canada	30	50	42	45	167
7	Argentina	50	50	28	33	161
8	Iran	25	50	26	36	137
9	France	0	30	50	50	130
10	Serbia	0	2	38	70	110
–	Japan	40	2	20	30	92
11	Belgium	0	1	34	45	80
12	Egypt	5	30	10	30	75
13	Bulgaria	0	2	30	40	72
14	Netherlands	0	0	18	50	68
15	Australia	5	3	19	36	63
16	Slovenia	0	0	22	40	62
17	Cuba	0	20	0	30	50
18	Finland	0	1	13	33	47
19	China	0	2	17	25	44
20	Mexico	0	20	6	14	40
21	Tunisia	5	3	5	25	38
22	Cameroon	0	2	0	30	32
23	South Korea	0	0	16	12	28
23	Puerto Rico	0	3	0	25	28

=== Qualified teams ===
Teams were seeded following the serpentine system according to their FIVB World Ranking as of 1 October 2018. Rankings are shown in brackets.

Pool A	Pool B	Pool C	Pool D	Pool E	Pool F
**Brazil** (1)	**United States** (2)	**Italy** (3) **(H)**	**Poland** (4) **(H)**	**Russia** (5) **(H)**	Canada (6)
Egypt (13)	Belgium (12)	Serbia (10)	France (9)	Iran (8)	**Argentina** (7)
Bulgaria (14) **(H)**	Netherlands (15) **(H)**	Australia (16)	Slovenia (17)	Cuba (18)	Finland (19)
Puerto Rico (25)	South Korea (24)	Cameroon (23)	Tunisia (22)	Mexico (21)	China (20) **(H)**

Notes

- Teams in **bold** qualified for the 2020 Summer Olympics.
- (H): Qualification group hosts

=== Final round ===
==== Means of qualification ====
Qualified for the 2020 Summer Olympics

==== Pool A ====
Pos	Team	Pld	Pts
1	Brazil (Q)	3	8
2	Bulgaria (H)	3	7
3	Egypt	3	3
4	Puerto Rico	3	0

Source: FIVB
(H) Host; (Q) Qualified for the phase indicated

==== Pool B ====
Pos	Team	Pld	Pts
1	United States (Q)	3	9
2	Netherlands (H)	3	5
3	Belgium	3	3
4	South Korea	3	1

Source: FIVB
(H) Host; (Q) Qualified for the phase indicated

==== Pool C ====
Pos	Team	Pld	Pts
1	Italy (H, Q)	3	8
2	Serbia	3	6
3	Australia	3	4
4	Cameroon	3	0

Source: FIVB
(H) Host; (Q) Qualified for the phase indicated

==== Pool D ====
Pos	Team	Pld	Pts
1	Poland (H, Q)	3	9
2	France	3	6
3	Slovenia	3	3
4	Tunisia	3	0

Source: FIVB
(H) Host; (Q) Qualified for the phase indicated

==== Pool E ====
Pos	Team	Pld	Pts
1	Russia (H, Q)	3	9
2	Iran	3	5
3	Cuba	3	4
4	Mexico	3	0

Source: FIVB
(H) Host; (Q) Qualified for the phase indicated

==== Pool F ====
Pos	Team	Pld	Pts
1	Argentina (Q)	3	8
2	Canada	3	5
3	China (H)	3	5
4	Finland	3	0

Source: FIVB
(H) Host; (Q) Qualified for the phase indicated

== Continental Olympic Qualification Tournaments ==
=== Africa ===
- The winners in final round qualified for the 2020 Summer Olympics.

==== Qualified teams ====
of the 53 CAVB and IOC member associations, a total of 5 CAVB member national teams entered the qualifying stage. But, Ghana were disqualified for not arriving in Cairo until just before the beginning of the tournament. All of Ghana's matches were forfeited and Ghana were ranked in last place in the final standing.

Final round

Round robin
Algeria
Cameroon
Egypt **(H)**
Ghana **(D)**
Tunisia

==== Final round ====
Of the 4 qualified teams, only winners of this round qualified for the 2020 Summer Olympics.

===== Means of qualification =====
Qualified for the 2020 Summer Olympics

===== Round robin =====
Pos	Team	Pld	Pts
1	Tunisia (Q)	3	9
2	Egypt (H)	3	6
3	Algeria	3	3
4	Cameroon	3	0
5	Ghana (D)	0	0

Source: FIVB
(D) Disqualified; (H) Host; (Q) Qualified for the phase indicated

=== Asia and Oceania ===
- The winners in final round qualified for the 2020 Summer Olympics.

==== Qualified teams ====
Of the 61 AVC and IOC member associations, a total of 18 AVC member national teams entered the qualifying stage

Zonal qualification round

Pool WZ
Iraq
**Kuwait**
**Oman** **(H)**

Inter-zonal qualification round

Pool A	Pool B
**Iran** **(H)**	Japan
**Australia**	**Chinese Taipei**
**Qatar**	Thailand
Sri Lanka	Hong Kong
Pool C	Pool D
**Kazakhstan**	**South Korea**
**China**	Indonesia
Oman	Kuwait
**India**	~~Pakistan~~

Final round

Pool A	Pool B
Iran	Australia
Chinese Taipei	South Korea
China **(H)**	India
Kazakhstan	Qatar

Notes

- Teams in **bold** qualified for the next phase and final tournament.
- (H): Qualification group hosts
- Kazakhstan replaced Pakistan who withdrew from the final round.

==== Zonal qualification round ====
Of the 3 western zone teams, top two teams qualified to the next round.

===== Means of qualification =====
Qualified for the 2019 Asian Championship

===== Western Asia =====
Pos	Team	Pld	Pts
1	Kuwait (Q)	2	6
2	Oman (H, Q)	2	3
3	Iraq	2	0

Source: AVC
(H) Host; (Q) Qualified for the phase indicated

==== Inter-zonal qualification round ====
Of the 16 qualified teams, the top eight teams (excluding Japan) qualified for the next round.

===== Means of qualification =====
Qualified for the 2020 Asian Olympic Qualifier
Qualified for the 2020 Asian Olympic Qualifier playoffs
Already qualified as hosts for the 2020 Summer Olympics

===== Pool A =====
Pos	Team	Pld	Pts
1	Australia (Q)	3	8
2	Iran (H, Q)	3	6
3	Qatar	3	4
4	Sri Lanka	3	0

Source: AVC
(H) Host; (Q) Qualified for the phase indicated

===== Pool B =====
Pos	Team	Pld	Pts
1	Japan	3	9
2	Chinese Taipei (Q)	3	6
3	Thailand	3	3
4	Hong Kong	3	0

Source: AVC
(Q) Qualified for the phase indicated

===== Pool C =====
Pos	Team	Pld	Pts
1	China (Q)	3	9
2	India (Q)	3	5
3	Kazakhstan	3	4
4	Oman	3	0

Source: AVC
(Q) Qualified for the phase indicated

===== Pool D =====
Pos	Team	Pld	Pts
1	South Korea (Q)	3	9
2	Pakistan (Q)	3	5
3	Indonesia	3	4
4	Kuwait	3	0

Source: AVC
(Q) Qualified for the phase indicated

===== Pool G =====
Pos	Team	Pld	Pts
1	Qatar	3	6
2	Kazakhstan	3	6
3	Sri Lanka	3	6
4	Oman	3	0

Source: AVC

===== Pool H =====
Pos	Team	Pld	Pts
1	Thailand	3	8
2	Indonesia	3	7
3	Hong Kong	3	3
4	Kuwait	3	0

Source: AVC

===== 9th–12th places round =====
9th–12th semifinals
19 September
**Qatar**	**3**
Indonesia	0
19 September
Thailand	2
**Kazakhstan**	**3**

9th place match
20 September
**Qatar (Q)**	**3**
Kazakhstan **(Q)**	1
11th place match
20 September
Indonesia	2
**Thailand**	**3**

- Note: Kazakhstan replaced Pakistan, who withdrew from the final round.

==== Final round ====
Of the 8 qualified teams, only the winners of this round qualified for the 2020 Summer Olympics.

===== Means of qualification =====
Qualified for the 2020 Asian Olympic Qualifier semifinals

===== Pool A =====
Pos	Team	Pld	Pts
1	Iran	3	9
2	China (H)	3	5
3	Chinese Taipei	3	4
4	Kazakhstan	3	0

Source: FIVB
(H) Host

===== Pool B =====
Pos	Team	Pld	Pts
1	Qatar	3	7
2	South Korea	3	6
3	Australia	3	5
4	India	3	0

Source: FIVB

===== Final four =====
Semifinals
11 January
Qatar	1
**China**	**3**
11 January
**Iran**	**3**
South Korea	2

Final
12 January
China	0
**Iran (Q)**	**3**

=== Europe ===
- The winners in final round qualified for the 2020 Summer Olympics.

==== Qualification round ====
The hosts Germany and the top seven ranked teams from the CEV European Ranking as of 30 September 2019 which had not yet qualified to the 2020 Summer Olympics competed in the 2020 European Olympic Qualification Tournament.

Qualified for the 2020 European Olympic Qualifier
Already qualified for the 2020 Summer Olympics via the 2019 Intercontinental Olympic Qualifier

Seeding	Team	ECH 2019	ECH 2017	WCH 2018	WL 2017	Total
1	Serbia	100	96	48	48	292
–	Russia	92	100	44	46	282
–	Poland	96	82	50	42	270
2	France	94	84	42	50	270
–	Italy	90	92	46	38	266
3	Belgium	84	94	38	44	260
4	Slovenia	98	86	36	36	256
5	Bulgaria	80	90	36	40	246
6	Netherlands	82	74	42	34	232
H	Germany	86	98	28	18	230
7	Czech Republic	76	88	20	30	214

==== Final round ====
Of the 8 qualified teams, only the winners of this round qualified for the 2020 Summer Olympics.

===== Means of qualification =====
Qualified for the 2020 European Olympic Qualifier semifinals

===== Pool A =====
Pos	Team	Pld	Pts
1	Slovenia	3	8
2	Germany (H)	3	7
3	Belgium	3	2
4	Czech Republic	3	1

Source: FIVB
(H) Host

===== Pool B =====
Pos	Team	Pld	Pts
1	Bulgaria	3	7
2	France	3	5
3	Serbia	3	4
4	Netherlands	3	2

Source: FIVB

===== Final four =====
Semifinals
9 January
Slovenia	2
**France**	**3**
9 January
Bulgaria	1
**Germany**	**3**

Final
10 January
**France (Q)**	**3**
Germany	0

=== North America ===
- The winners in final round qualified for the 2020 Summer Olympics.

==== Qualified teams ====
Of the 35 NORCECA and IOC member associations, a total of 7 NORCECA member national teams entered the qualifying stage

Qualification round – NORCECA Champions Cup

Round robin
United States **(H)**
Canada
**Cuba**
Puerto Rico

Qualification round – NORCECA Championship

Pool A	Pool B
**Canada** **(H)**	United States
**Mexico**	Cuba
**Puerto Rico**	Dominican Republic
	Guatemala

Final round

Round robin
Canada **(H)**
Cuba
Mexico
Puerto Rico

Notes

- Teams in **bold** qualified for the next phase and final tournament.
- (H): Qualification group hosts

==== Qualification round ====
The 2019 NORCECA Champions Cup champions and the top three teams from the 2019 NORCECA Championship which had not yet qualified to the 2020 Summer Olympics competed in the 2020 North American Olympic Qualification Tournament.

===== Means of qualification =====
Qualified for the 2020 North American Olympic Qualifier
Qualified for the 2020 North American Olympic Qualifier playoffs
Already qualified for the 2020 Summer Olympics via the 2019 Intercontinental Olympic Qualifier

===== NORCECA Champions Cup – Round robin =====
Pos	Team	Pld	Pts
1	Cuba **(Q)**	3	12
2	United States **(H)**	3	7
3	Canada	3	6
4	Puerto Rico	3	5

Source: NORCECA
**(H)** Host; **(Q)** Qualified to the phase indicated.

===== NORCECA Championship – Pool A =====
Pos	Team	Pld	Pts
1	Canada **(H, Q)**	2	10
2	Mexico	2	5
3	Puerto Rico	2	0

Source: NORCECA
**(H)** Host; **(Q)** Qualified to the phase indicated.

===== NORCECA Championship – Pool B =====
Pos	Team	Pld	Pts
1	United States	3	15
2	Cuba	3	10
3	Dominican Republic	3	4
4	Guatemala	3	1

Source: NORCECA
**(Q)** Qualified to the phase indicated.

===== NORCECA Championship – Final round =====
Quarterfinals
5 September
**Cuba**	**3**
Puerto Rico	0
5 September
**Mexico (Q)**	**3**
Dominican Republic	1

Semifinals
6 September
Canada	1
**Cuba**	**3**
6 September
**United States**	**3**
Mexico	0

Final
7 September
**Cuba**	**3**
United States	1
3rd place match
7 September
**Canada**	**3**
Mexico	0

5th place match
6 September
Dominican Republic	2
**Puerto Rico (Q)**	**3**

==== Final round ====
Of the 4 qualified teams, only winners of this round qualified for the 2020 Summer Olympics.

===== Means of qualification =====
Qualified for the 2020 Summer Olympics

===== Round robin =====
Pos	Team	Pld	Pts
1	Canada **(H, Q)**	3	13
2	Cuba	3	11
3	Mexico	3	5
4	Puerto Rico	3	1

Source: FIVB
(H) Host; (Q) Qualified to the phase indicated.

=== South America ===
- The winners in final round qualified for the 2020 Summer Olympics.

==== Qualified teams ====
Of the 11 CSV and IOC member associations, a total of 8 CSV member national teams entered the qualifying stage

Qualification round

Pool A	Pool B
Brazil	**Chile** **(H)**
Argentina	**Venezuela**
**Colombia**	**Peru**
Ecuador	Bolivia

Final round

Round robin
Chile **(H)**
Venezuela
Peru
Colombia

Notes

- Teams in **bold** qualified for the next phase and final tournament.
- (H): Qualification group hosts

==== Qualification round ====
The top four teams from the 2019 South American Championship which had not yet qualified to the 2020 Summer Olympics competed in the 2020 South American Olympic Qualification Tournament.

===== Means of qualification =====
Qualified for the 2020 South American Olympic Qualifier
Qualified for the 2020 South American Olympic Qualifier playoffs
Already qualified for the 2020 Summer Olympics via the 2019 Intercontinental Olympic Qualifier

===== Pool A =====
Pos	Team	Pld	Pts
1	Brazil	3	9
2	Argentina	3	6
3	Colombia	3	3
4	Ecuador	3	0

Source: CSV

===== Pool B =====
Pos	Team	Pld	Pts
1	Venezuela (Q)	3	7
2	Chile (Q)	3	6
3	Peru	3	5
4	Bolivia	3	0

Source: CSV
(Q) Qualified for the phase indicated

===== 5th–8th places round =====
5th–8th semifinals
13 September
**Peru (Q)**	**3**
Ecuador	0
13 September
**Colombia (Q)**	**3**
Bolivia	0

5th place match
14 September
**Peru**	**3**
Colombia	2
7th place match
14 September
**Ecuador**	**3**
Bolivia	1

==== Final round ====
Of the 4 qualified teams, only winners of this round qualified for the 2020 Summer Olympics.

===== Means of qualification =====
Qualified for the 2020 Summer Olympics

===== Round robin =====
Pos	Team	Pld	Pts
1	Venezuela (Q)	3	7
2	Chile (H)	3	6
3	Colombia	3	5
4	Peru	3	0

Source: FIVB
(H) Host; (Q) Qualified for the phase indicated
