= 2019 Men's NORCECA Volleyball Champions Cup =

2019 Men's NORCECA Champions Cup
Tournament details
- Host country: United States
- City: Colorado Springs
- Dates: 22–24 August
- Teams: 4 (from 1 confederation)
- Venue: 1 (in 1 host city)

Final positions
- Champions: Cuba (1st title)
- Runners-up: United States
- Third place: Canada
- Fourth place: Puerto Rico

Tournament awards
- MVP: (Cuba) Robertlandy Simón
- Best Setter: (Cuba) Adrián Goide
- Best OH: (United States) Cody Kessel (Cuba) Osniel Melgarejo
- Best MB: (Cuba) Robertlandy Simón (United States) Patrick Gasman
- Best OPP: (Canada) Blake Scheerhoorn
- Best Libero: (Canada) Jeremy Davies

Tournament statistics
- Matches played: 6
- Best scorer: (Canada) Blake Scheerhoorn (52 points)
- Best server: (Cuba) Jesús Herrera (0.83 Avg)
- Best digger: (Canada) Jeremy Davies (3.33 Avg)
- Best receiver: (Cuba) Yonder García (53.85%)

The 2019 Men's NORCECA Volleyball Champions Cup was the second edition of the tournament, and was held in Colorado Springs, United States from 22 to 24 August 2019. The champions which had not yet qualified to the 2020 Summer Olympics qualified for the 2020 North American Olympic Qualification Tournament.

== Qualification ==
The hosts United States and the top three ranked teams from the NORCECA Ranking as of 1 January 2019 qualified for the tournament. Rankings are shown in brackets except the hosts who ranked 1st.

- United States (Hosts)
- Canada (2)
- Cuba (3)
- Puerto Rico (4)

== Venue ==
- OTC Sports Center I, Colorado Springs, United States

== Pool standing procedure ==
1. Number of matches won
2. Match points
3. Points ratio
4. Sets ratio
5. Result of the last match between the tied teams

Match won 3–0: 5 match points for the winner, 0 match points for the loser
Match won 3–1: 4 match points for the winner, 1 match point for the loser
Match won 3–2: 3 match points for the winner, 2 match points for the loser

== Round robin ==
- All times are Mountain Daylight Time (UTC−06:00).

Pos	Team	Pld	W	L	Pts	SPW	SPL	SPR	SW	SL	SR
1	Cuba	3	3	0	12	283	245	1.155	9	3	3.000
2	United States	3	1	2	7	255	247	1.032	5	6	0.833
3	Canada	3	1	2	6	267	281	0.950	5	7	0.714
4	Puerto Rico	3	1	2	5	187	219	0.854	3	6	0.500

Date	Time		Score		Set 1	Set 2	Set 3	Set 4	Set 5	Total	Report
22 Aug	13:00	Cuba	3–2	Canada	25–19	19–25	25–17	22–25	15–11	106–97	P2 P3
22 Aug	20:56	United States	3–0	Puerto Rico	25–13	25–16	25–15			75–44	P2 P3
23 Aug	13:00	Canada	0–3	Puerto Rico	19–25	24–26	21–25			64–76	P2 P3
23 Aug	19:22	United States	1–3	Cuba	19–25	23–25	25–22	14–25		81–97	P2 P3
24 Aug	13:00	Puerto Rico	0–3	Cuba	28–30	17–25	22–25			67–80	P2 P3
24 Aug	19:50	United States	1–3	Canada	26–28	20–25	29–27	24–26		99–106	P2 P3

== Final standing ==
Rank	Team	Qualification
1st place, gold medalist(s)	Cuba	Qualified for the 2020 North American Olympic Qualifier
2nd place, silver medalist(s)	United States	Already qualified for the 2020 Summer Olympics via the 2019 Intercontinental Olympic Qualifier
3rd place, bronze medalist(s)	Canada	
4	Puerto Rico	

2019 NORCECA Men's Champions Cup champions

Cuba
1st title

12–man roster
Melgarejo, Yant, Concepción, García, Osoria (c), Taboada, Herrera, Simón, Goide, León, Alonso, López
Head coach
Vives

== Awards ==
- Most valuable player
  (Cuba) Robertlandy Simón
- Best scorer
  (Canada) Blake Scheerhoorn
- Best server
  (Cuba) Jesús Herrera
- Best digger
  (Canada) Jeremy Davies
- Best receiver
  (Cuba) Yonder García
- Best setter
  (Cuba) Adrián Goide
- Best outside spikers
  (United States) Cody Kessel
  (Cuba) Osniel Melgarejo
- Best middle blockers
  (Cuba) Robertlandy Simón
  (United States) Patrick Gasman
- Best opposite spiker
  (Canada) Blake Scheerhoorn
- Best libero
  (Canada) Jeremy Davies

== See also ==
- 2019 Women's NORCECA Volleyball Champions Cup
