= Volleyball at the 2020 Summer Olympics – Men's North American qualification =

2020 Men's North American Olympic Qualification Tournament
Tournament details
- Host country: Canada
- City: Vancouver
- Dates: 10–12 January
- Teams: 4 (from 1 confederation)
- Venue: 1 (in 1 host city)

Final positions
- Champions: Canada (1st title)
- Runners-up: Cuba
- Third place: Puerto Rico
- Fourth place: Mexico

Tournament awards
- MVP: (Canada) Blair Bann
- Best Setter: (Canada) Jay Blankenau
- Best OH: (Canada) Stephen Maar (Canada) John Gordon Perrin
- Best MB: (Canada) Arthur Szwarc (Cuba) Liván Osoria
- Best OPP: (Puerto Rico) Maurice Torres
- Best Libero: (Puerto Rico) Arnel Cabrera

Tournament statistics
- Matches played: 6
- Best scorer: (Canada) Stephen Maar (44 points)
- Best server: (Cuba) Miguel Ángel López (0.67 Avg)
- Best digger: (Mexico) Jesús Rangel (1.20 Avg)
- Best receiver: (Canada) Blair Bann (63.41%)

The North American Qualification Tournament for the 2020 Men's Olympic Volleyball Tournament was a volleyball tournament for men's national teams held in Vancouver, Canada from 10 to 12 January 2020. Four teams played in the tournament and the winners Canada qualified for the 2020 Summer Olympics.

== Qualification ==
The 2019 NORCECA Champions Cup champions which had not yet qualified to the 2020 Summer Olympics and the top three teams from the 2019 NORCECA Championship which had not yet qualified to the 2020 Summer Olympics or the tournament qualified for the tournament. Final standings of the 2019 NORCECA Champions Cup or 2019 NORCECA Championship are shown in brackets.

- Cuba (2019 NORCECA Champions Cup Champions)
- Canada (2019 NORCECA Championship 3rd place)
- Mexico (2019 NORCECA Championship 4th place)
- Puerto Rico (2019 NORCECA Championship 5th place)

== Venue ==
All matches
Vancouver, Canada
Pacific Coliseum
Capacity: 16,281
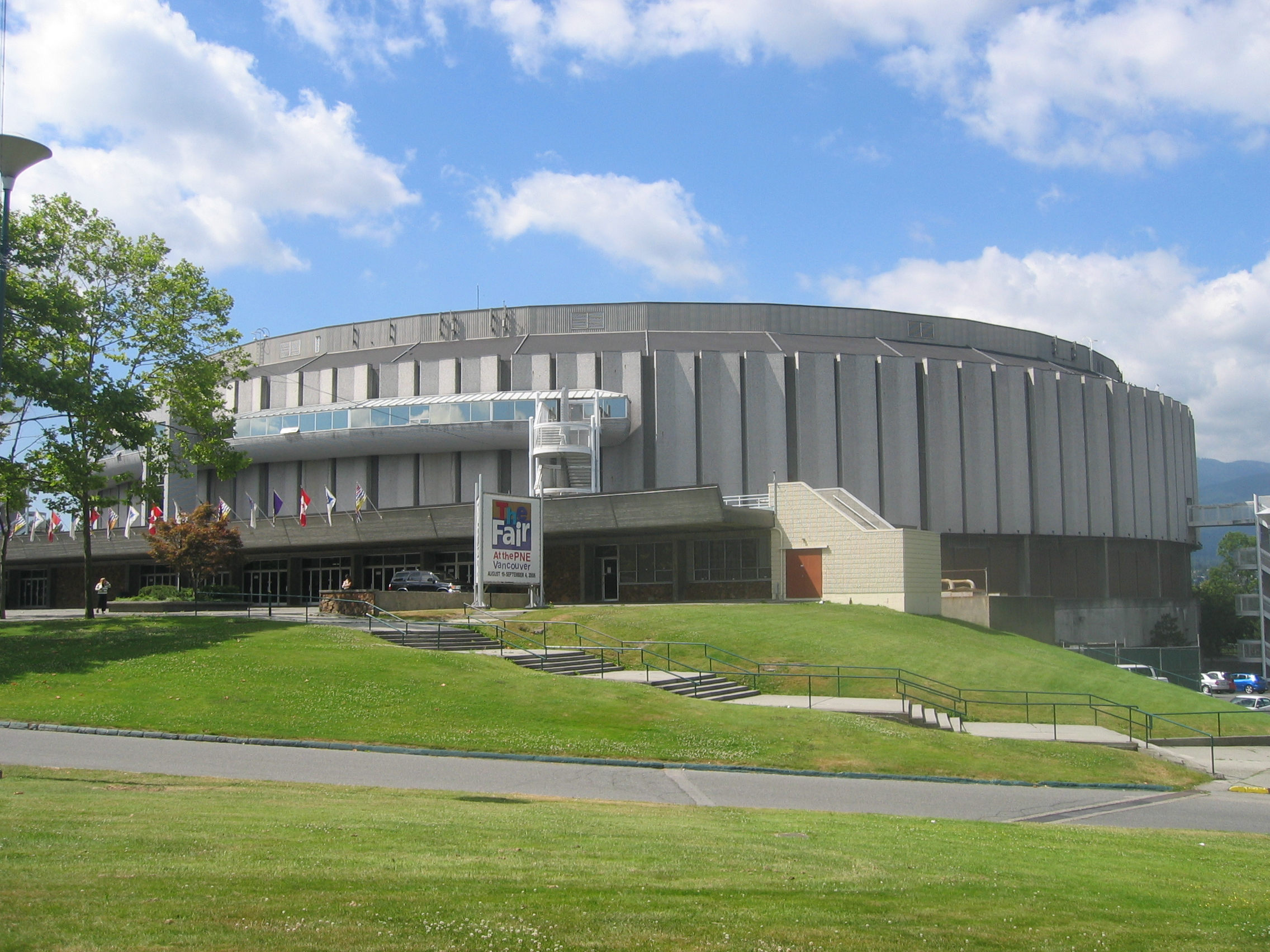

== Pool standing procedure ==
1. Number of matches won
2. Match points
3. Points ratio
4. Sets ratio
5. Result of the last match between the tied teams

Match won 3–0: 5 match points for the winner, 0 match points for the loser
Match won 3–1: 4 match points for the winner, 1 match point for the loser
Match won 3–2: 3 match points for the winner, 2 match points for the loser

== Round robin ==
- All times are Pacific Standard Time (UTC−08:00).

Pos	Team	Pld	W	L	Pts	SPW	SPL	SPR	SW	SL	SR
1	Canada	3	3	0	13	259	190	1.363	9	2	4.500
2	Cuba	3	2	1	11	268	249	1.076	8	4	2.000
3	Puerto Rico	3	1	2	5	178	220	0.809	3	6	0.500
4	Mexico	3	0	3	1	206	252	0.817	1	9	0.111

Date	Time		Score		Set 1	Set 2	Set 3	Set 4	Set 5	Total	Report
10 Jan	18:30	Canada	3–0	Mexico	25–16	25–14	25–17			75–47	P2 P3
10 Jan	20:45	Cuba	3–0	Puerto Rico	25–18	25–14	25–19			75–51	P2 P3
11 Jan	15:30	Puerto Rico	3–0	Mexico	26–24	25–23	25–23			76–70	P2 P3
11 Jan	18:05	Canada	3–2	Cuba	22–25	22–25	25–12	25–21	15–9	109–92	P2 P3
12 Jan	14:00	Cuba	3–1	Mexico	26–28	25–20	25–20	25–21		101–89	P2 P3
12 Jan	16:45	Canada	3–0	Puerto Rico	25–21	25–15	25–15			75–51	P2 P3

== Final standing ==
Rank	Team
1	Canada
2	Cuba
3	Puerto Rico
4	Mexico

Qualified for the 2020 Summer Olympics

== Qualifying team for Summer Olympics ==
Team	Qualified on	Previous appearances in Summer Olympics (Note: Bold indicates champions for that year. Italic indicates hosts for that year.)
Canada	12 January 2020	4 (1976, 1984, 1992, 2016)

== Awards ==
- **Most valuable player**
  (Canada) Blair Bann
- **Best scorer**
  (Canada) Stephen Maar
- **Best server**
  (Cuba) Miguel Ángel López
- **Best digger**
  (Mexico) Jesús Rangel
- **Best receiver**
  (Canada) Blair Bann
- **Best setter**
  (Canada) Jay Blankenau
- **Best outside spikers**
  (Canada) Stephen Maar
  (Canada) John Gordon Perrin
- **Best middle blockers**
  (Canada) Arthur Szwarc
  (Cuba) Liván Osoria
- **Best opposite spiker**
  (Puerto Rico) Maurice Torres
- **Best libero**
  (Puerto Rico) Arnel Cabrera

== See also ==
- Volleyball at the 2020 Summer Olympics – Women's North American qualification
