= 2018 FIVB Men's Volleyball World Championship statistics =

International volleyball sporting competition

The final tournament was held in Italy and Bulgaria from 9 to 30 September 2018.

Poland defended their world title, defeating the reigning Olympic champions Brazil in straight sets at a repeat of the 2014 final. United States won the 3rd place match, defeating Serbia in four sets.

== Tournament statistics ==
=== Attendance ===
- Matches played : 94
- Attendance (first round) (played 60) : 190,213 (3,170 per match)
- Attendance (second round) (played 24) : 90,124 (3,755 per match)
- Attendance (third round) (played 6) : 61,361 (10,227 per match)
- Attendance (final round) (played 4) : 47,331 (11,833 per match)
- Total attendance on tournament : 389,029 (4,139 per match)
- Most attendance : 12,875 - Russia v. Italy, Forum di Assago, Milan on 22 September 2018.
- Fewest attendance : 230 - Cuba v. Puerto Rico, Palace of Culture and Sports, Varna on 17 September 2018.

=== Matches ===
- Most matches wins : 10 - Brazil, United States
- Fewest matches wins : 0 - Puerto Rico, China, Tunisia, Dominican Republic
- Most matches lost : 5 - Puerto Rico, China, Tunisia, Dominican Republic
- Fewest matches lost : 2 - Brazil, United States, Italy
- Most points played in match : 230 - Japan vs. Argentina 3 : 2 (116/114)
- Fewest points played in match : 116 - Puerto Rico vs. Poland 0 : 3 (41/75)
- Longest match played (duration) : 149 min. - Puerto Rico vs. Finland (2h,29m)
- Shortest match played (duration) : 72 min. - United States vs. Tunisia (1h,12m)

=== Sets ===
- Total sets (first round) : 226 (3.77 per match)
- Total sets (second round) : 91 (3.79 per match)
- Total sets (third round) : 22 (3.67 per match)
- Total sets (final round) : 15 (3.75 per match)
- Total sets scored : 353 (3.76 per match)
- Most sets played : 46 - Poland
- Most sets wins : 32 - Poland, United States
- Fewest sets wins : 1 - Dominican Republic
- Most sets lost : 21 - Serbia, Finland
- Fewest sets lost : 11 - Italy, Japan
- Highest set ratio : 2.462 - United States (32/13)
- Lowest set ratio : 0.067 - Dominican Republic (1/15)

=== Points ===
- Total points (first round) : 9,882 (165 per match)
- Total points (second round) : 3,979 (166 per match)
- Total points (third round) : 967 (161 per match)
- Total points (final round) : 694 (174 per match)
- Total points scored : 15,522 (165 per match)
- Most points wins : 1,068 - Poland
- Fewest points wins : 267 - Dominican Republic
- Most points lost : 991 - Serbia
- Fewest points lost : 398 - Cameroon, Dominican Republic
- Highest points ratio : 1.141 - Poland (1068/936)
- Lowest points ratio : 0.671 - Dominican Republic (267/398)

== Squads ==
=== Coaches ===
- Oldest coach: Antonio Giacobbe Tunisia - 71 years and 212 days in the first game against Brazil.
- Youngest coach: Tuomas Sammelvuo Finland - 42 years and 206 days in the first game against Bulgaria.
- Teams with foreign coaches: 7 teams are trained by foreign coaches, including two teams (Dominican Republic and Iran) of coaches whose home countries (Venezuela and Montenegro) did not qualify for the 2018 FIVB Men's Volleyball World Championship.

=== Players ===
- Appearance record: Luciano De Cecco Argentina, Nathan Roberts, Paul Carroll Australia, Teodor Salparov Bulgaria, Ahmed Abdelhay Egypt and Marko Podraščanin Serbia participated in the World Championship for the fourth time.
- Oldest player: At 39 years and 130 days, Jean Patrice Ndaki Mboulet Cameroon is the oldest player ever to be nominated for a 2018 FIVB Men's Volleyball World Championship finals.
- Youngest player: Marlon Yang Cuba is the youngest player at the age of 17 years and 111 days.
- Tallest player: At 2.18 m (7 ft 2 in), Dmitry Muserskiy Russia is the tallest player ever to be nominated for a 2018 FIVB Men's Volleyball World Championship finals.
- Shortest player: At 1.70 m (5 ft 7 in), Taichiro Koga Japan is the shortest player ever to be nominated for a 2018 FIVB Men's Volleyball World Championship finals.
- 21 teams nominated at least one player from the domestic league, Cameroon, Bulgaria, Japan and Puerto Rico nominated at least one player who is free agent, but only China, Cuba, Dominican Republic, Egypt, Italy, Japan, Puerto Rico and Russia exclusively fielded players of its own domestic league. By contrast, Australia, Canada and Netherlands nominated only players from foreign leagues.
- The most players (51) are active in clubs based in Italy, the majority of them in the SuperLega. In total 15 of the 24 team squads have players who play in England.
- From the leagues of countries that did not qualify for the World Cup, the Germany Bundesliga have the strongest representation with 12 players.

== Multiple World Championships ==
Name	(Japan) 2006	(Italy) 2010	(Poland) 2014	(Italy) / (Bulgaria) 2018	Total
(Argentina) Luciano De Cecco	✔				4
(Australia) Nathan Roberts	✔				4
(Australia) Paul Carroll	✔				4
(Bulgaria) Teodor Salparov	✔				4
(Egypt) Ahmed Abdelhay	✔				4
(Serbia) Marko Podraščanin	✔				4
(Argentina) Facundo Conte		✔			3
(Argentina) Pablo Crer		✔			3
(Australia) Travis Passier		✔			3
(Brazil) Bruno Rezende		✔			3
(Brazil) Lucas Saatkamp		✔			3
(Bulgaria) Nikolay Penchev		✔			3
(Bulgaria) Svetoslav Gotsev		✔			3
(Bulgaria) Viktor Yosifov		✔			3
(Cameroon) Alain Fossi Kamto		✔			3
(Cameroon) Jean Patrice Ndaki Mboulet		✔			3
(Cameroon) Nathan Wounembaina		✔			3
(Cameroon) Sem Dolegombai		✔			3
(Canada) John Gordon Perrin		✔			3
(France) Earvin N'Gapeth		✔			3
(France) Kévin Le Roux		✔			3
(Iran) Mohammad Mousavi		✔			3
(Iran) Saeid Marouf		✔			3
(Italy) Ivan Zaytsev		✔			3
(Egypt) Abdallah Abdalsalam	✔			✔	3
(Egypt) Mohamed Badawy		✔			3
(Egypt) Rashad Atia		✔			3
(Poland) Michał Kubiak		✔			3
(Poland) Piotr Nowakowski		✔			3
(Puerto Rico) Ángel Pérez	✔			✔	3
(Russia) Aleksey Verbov	✔			✔	3
(Russia) Dmitry Muserskiy	✔			✔	3
(Russia) Sergey Grankin		✔			3
(Russia) Yury Berezhko	✔			✔	3
(Serbia) Nemanja Petrić		✔			3
(Serbia) Nikola Rosić		✔			3
(Tunisia) Ahmed Kadhi		✔			3
(Tunisia) Amen Allah Hmissi	✔			✔	3
(Tunisia) Anouer Taouerghi		✔			3
(Tunisia) Hamza Nagga		✔			3
(Tunisia) Nabil Miladi		✔			3
(United States) Maxwell Holt		✔			3
(Argentina) Alexis González		✔		✔	2
(Argentina) José Luis González			✔		2
(Argentina) Martín Ramos			✔		2
(Argentina) Sebastián Solé			✔		2
(Australia) Harrison Peacock			✔		2
(Australia) Luke Perry			✔		2
(Australia) Luke Smith			✔		2
(Australia) Nehemiah Mote			✔		2
(Belgium) Bram Van Den Dries			✔		2
(Belgium) Hendrik Tuerlinckx			✔		2
(Belgium) Kevin Klinkenberg			✔		2
(Belgium) Lowie Stuer			✔		2
(Belgium) Matthias Valkiers			✔		2
(Belgium) Pieter Coolman			✔		2
(Belgium) Sam Deroo			✔		2
(Belgium) Simon Van De Voorde			✔		2
(Brazil) Éder Carbonera			✔		2
(Brazil) Luiz Felipe Fonteles			✔		2
(Brazil) Maurício Souza			✔		2
(Brazil) Wallace de Souza			✔		2
(Bulgaria) Georgi Seganov			✔		2
(Bulgaria) Miroslav Gradinarov			✔		2
(Bulgaria) Nikolay Nikolov		✔		✔	2
(Bulgaria) Teodor Todorov			✔		2
(Bulgaria) Todor Skrimov			✔		2
(Bulgaria) Valentin Bratoev		✔		✔	2
(Cameroon) Ahmed Awal Mbutngam			✔		2
(Cameroon) David Feughouo		✔		✔	2
(Cameroon) Hervé Kofane Boyomo			✔		2
(Cameroon) Jean Pierre Ndongo		✔		✔	2
(Cameroon) Yvan Bitjaa			✔		2
(Canada) Graham Vigrass			✔		2
(Canada) Nicholas Hoag			✔		2
(Canada) Steven Marshall			✔		2
(Canada) TJ Sanders			✔		2
(China) Chen Longhai			✔		2
(China) Ji Daoshuai			✔		2
(China) Zhang Chen		✔		✔	2
(Cuba) Liván Osoria			✔		2
(Egypt) Abou Abd Elahim			✔		2
(Egypt) Hossam Abdalla			✔		2
(Egypt) Mohamed Thakil			✔		2
(Finland) Eemi Tervaportti			✔		2
(Finland) Lauri Kerminen			✔		2
(Finland) Tommi Siirilä			✔		2
(Finland) Mikko Esko			✔		2
(Finland) Urpo Sivula			✔		2
(France) Benjamin Toniutti			✔		2
(France) Jenia Grebennikov			✔		2
(France) Jonas Aguenier			✔		2
(France) Kévin Tillie			✔		2
(France) Nicolas Le Goff			✔		2
(Iran) Milad Ebadipour			✔		2
(Iran) Amir Ghafour			✔		2
(Iran) Farhad Ghaemi			✔		2
(Iran) Saman Faezi			✔		2
(Italy) Filippo Lanza			✔		2
(Italy) Michele Baranowicz			✔		2
(Italy) Salvatore Rossini			✔		2
(Italy) Simone Anzani			✔		2
(Japan) Tatsuya Fukuzawa		✔		✔	2
(Poland) Dawid Konarski			✔		2
(Poland) Fabian Drzyzga			✔		2
(Poland) Grzegorz Łomacz		✔		✔	2
(Poland) Bartosz Kurek		✔		✔	2
(Poland) Paweł Zatorski			✔		2
(Puerto Rico) Dennis Del Valle			✔		2
(Puerto Rico) Edgardo Goás			✔		2
(Puerto Rico) Ezequiel Cruz			✔		2
(Puerto Rico) Maurice Torres			✔		2
(Russia) Artem Volvich			✔		2
(Russia) Maxim Mikhaylov		✔		✔	2
(Serbia) Aleksandar Atanasijević			✔		2
(Serbia) Marko Ivović			✔		2
(Serbia) Neven Majstorović			✔		2
(Serbia) Srećko Lisinac			✔		2
(Serbia) Uroš Kovačević			✔		2
(Tunisia) Elyes Karamosli			✔		2
(Tunisia) Mohamed Ali Ben Othmen Miladi			✔		2
(United States) David Smith			✔		2
(United States) Kawika Shoji			✔		2
(United States) Matt Anderson			✔		2
(United States) Micah Christenson			✔		2
(United States) Taylor Sander			✔		2

== Final standing ==
Pos	Team	Pld	W	L	Pts	SW	SL	SR	SPW	SPL	SPR	Qualification or relegation
1st place, gold medalist(s)	Poland	12	9	3	28	32	14	2.286	1068	936	1.141	Champions
2nd place, silver medalist(s)	Brazil	12	10	2	27	31	13	2.385	1024	925	1.107	Runners up
3rd place, bronze medalist(s)	United States	12	10	2	29	32	13	2.462	1044	927	1.126	Third place
4	Serbia	12	7	5	20	24	21	1.143	1012	991	1.021	Fourth place
5	Italy	10	8	2	24	26	11	2.364	841	742	1.133	Eliminated in third round
6	Russia	10	6	4	19	23	14	1.643	850	759	1.120	Eliminated in third round
7	France	8	5	3	18	21	12	1.750	765	688	1.112	Eliminated in second round
8	Netherlands	8	5	3	14	16	15	1.067	692	661	1.047	Eliminated in second round
9	Canada	8	5	3	13	18	14	1.286	712	694	1.026	Eliminated in second round
10	Belgium	8	4	4	14	16	14	1.143	667	657	1.015	Eliminated in second round
11	Bulgaria	8	4	4	13	16	12	1.333	625	617	1.013	Eliminated in second round
12	Slovenia	8	4	4	13	17	16	1.063	722	716	1.008	Eliminated in second round
13	Iran	8	4	4	12	14	16	0.875	674	664	1.015	Eliminated in second round
14	Australia	8	3	5	9	12	19	0.632	665	701	0.949	Eliminated in second round
15	Argentina	8	3	5	8	14	19	0.737	725	751	0.965	Eliminated in second round
16	Finland	8	2	6	6	10	21	0.476	638	719	0.887	Eliminated in second round
17	Japan	5	2	3	5	8	11	0.727	414	427	0.970	Eliminated in first round
18	Cuba	5	1	4	3	6	13	0.462	392	436	0.899	Eliminated in first round
19	Cameroon	5	1	4	3	4	12	0.333	334	398	0.839	Eliminated in first round
20	Egypt	5	1	4	3	4	13	0.308	368	426	0.864	Eliminated in first round
21	Puerto Rico	5	0	5	1	3	15	0.200	331	435	0.761	Eliminated in first round
22	China	5	0	5	0	3	15	0.200	375	440	0.852	Eliminated in first round
23	Tunisia	5	0	5	0	2	15	0.133	317	414	0.766	Eliminated in first round
24	Dominican Republic	5	0	5	0	1	15	0.067	267	398	0.671	Eliminated in first round

Source: WCH 2018 final standings

== Statistics leaders ==
The statistics of each group follows the vis reports P2 and P3. The statistics include 6 volleyball skills; serve, reception, set, spike, block, and dig. The table below shows the top 5 ranked players in each skill plus top scorers at the completion of the tournament. Only players whose teams advanced to the final round are taken in consideration.

Best Scorers
	Player	Spikes	Blocks	Serves	Total
1	(Poland) Bartosz Kurek	133	22	16	171
2	(United States) Matt Anderson	138	9	16	163
3	(Brazil) Wallace de Souza	145	6	6	157
4	(United States) Aaron Russell	135	10	8	153
5	(Brazil) Douglas Souza	129	10	11	150

Best Spikers
	Player	Spikes	Faults	Shots	Total	%
1	(Brazil) Douglas Souza	129	28	71	228	56.58
2	(United States) Matthew Anderson	138	47	59	244	56.56
3	(United States) Taylor Sander	107	34	49	190	56.32
4	(Serbia) Uroš Kovačević	104	31	59	194	53.61
5	(Brazil) Wallace de Souza	145	43	83	271	53.51

Best Blockers
	Player	Blocks	Faults	Rebounds	Total	Avg
1	(Poland) Bartosz Kurek	22	16	22	60	0.48
2	(Poland) Michał Kubiak	21	17	15	53	0.46
3	(Poland) Piotr Nowakowski	19	15	46	80	0.41
4	(Serbia) Srećko Lisinac	18	37	39	94	0.40
5	(United States) Maxwell Holt	17	37	42	96	0.38

Best Servers
	Player	Aces	Faults	Hits	Total	Avg
1	(Serbia) Marko Ivović	16	33	90	139	0.36
2	(United States) Matt Anderson	16	37	99	152	0.36
3	(Poland) Bartosz Kurek	16	35	59	110	0.35
4	(United States) Taylor Sander	15	41	90	146	0.33
5	(United States) Maxwell Holt	15	28	63	106	0.33

Best Setters
	Player	Running	Faults	Still	Total	Avg
1	(United States) Micah Christenson	293	8	473	774	6.51
2	(Serbia) Nikola Jovović	239	4	563	806	5.31
3	(Brazil) Bruno Rezende	190	2	422	614	4.32
4	(Brazil) William Arjona	156	1	189	246	1.27
5	(Poland) Fabian Drzyzga	52	3	588	643	1.12

Best Diggers
	Player	Digs	Faults	Receptions	Total	Avg
1	(United States) Erik Shoji	74	5	33	112	1.64
2	(Poland) Paweł Zatorski	69	10	42	121	1.50
3	(Brazil) Thales Hoss	60	7	26	93	1.36
4	(United States) Micah Christenson	48	5	25	78	1.07
5	(Brazil) Bruno Rezende	46	7	22	75	1.05

Best Receivers
	Player	Excellents	Faults	Serve	Total	%
1	(United States) Taylor Sander	82	10	115	207	34.78
2	(Poland) Paweł Zatorski	81	11	127	219	31.96
3	(Brazil) Douglas Souza	96	19	167	292	27.30
4	(Serbia) Marko Ivović	78	18	146	242	24.79
5	(Poland) Michał Kubiak	73	18	133	224	24.55

== Awards ==
- Most valuable player
  (Poland) Bartosz Kurek
- Best setter
  (United States) Micah Christenson
- Best outside spikers
  (Poland) Michał Kubiak
  (Brazil) Douglas Souza
- Best middle blockers
  (Brazil) Lucas Saatkamp
  (Poland) Piotr Nowakowski
- Best opposite spiker
  (United States) Matt Anderson
- Best libero
  (Poland) Paweł Zatorski

== See also ==
- FIVB Men's Volleyball Nations League statistics
- FIVB Volleyball Women's Nations League statistics
- Volleyball records and statistics
- Major achievements in volleyball by nation
- List of indoor volleyball world medalists
