= 2014–15 V-League (South Korea) =

V League
- Season: 2014–15
- Dates: 18 October 2014 – 1 April 2015

The 2014–15 V-League season was the 11th season of the V-League, the highest professional volleyball league in South Korea. The season started on 18 October 2014 and finished on 1 April 2015. Daejeon Samsung Bluefangs were the defending champions in the men's league and Pyeongtaek GS Caltex KIXX the defending female champions.

== Teams ==
=== Men's clubs ===
Location of teams in V-League Men's Clubs

Team	Location	Stadium	Capacity
Ansan OK Savings Bank Rush & Cash	Ansan	Sangnoksu Gymnasium	2,700
Cheonan Hyundai Capital Skywalkers	Cheonan	Yu Gwan-sun Gymnasium	5,482
Daejeon Samsung Bluefangs	Daejeon	Chungmu Gymnasium	5,000
Gumi LIG Greaters	Gumi	Park Jeong-hee Gymnasium	6,277
Incheon Korean Air Jumbos	Incheon	Gyeyang Gymnasium	5,000 Incheon Korean Air Jumbos
Asan Woori Card Hansae	Asan	Yi Sun-sin Icerink Gymnasium	3,303 Asan Woori Bank Wibee
Suwon KEPCO Vixtorm	Suwon	Suwon Gymnasium	4,317

=== Women's clubs ===
Location of teams in V-League Women's Clubs

Team	Location	Stadium	Capacity
Daejeon KGC	Daejeon	Chungmu Gymnasium	5,000
Seongnam Korea Expressway Hi-pass	Seongnam	Seongnam Gymnasium	5,711 Seongnam Sports Complex
Pyeongtaek GS Caltex KIXX	Pyeongtaek	Leechung Cultural Sports Centre Gymnasium	1,757 이충문화체육센터 실내체육관
Hwaseong IBK Altos	Hwaseong	Hwaseong Gymnasium	5,152 Hwaseong IBK Altos
Incheon Heungkuk Life Pink Spiders	Incheon	Gyeyang Gymnasium	5,000 Incheon Korean Air Jumbos
Suwon Hyundai Hillstate	Suwon	Suwon Gymnasium	4,317

== Season standing procedure ==
1. Match points
2. Number of matches won
3. Sets ratio
4. Points ratio
5. Result of the last match between the tied teams

Match won 3–0 or 3–1: 3 match points for the winner, 0 match points for the loser
Match won 3–2: 2 match points for the winner, 1 match point for the loser

== Regular season ==
=== League table (Male) ===
Pos	Team	Pld	W	L	Pts	SR	SPR	Qualification
1	Daejeon Samsung Bluefangs	36	29	7	84	2.310	1.097	Finals
2	Ansan Rush & Cash	36	25	11	71	1.527	1.060	Semifinals
3	Suwon KEPCO Vixtorm	36	23	13	65	1.311	1.040	Semifinals
4	Incheon Korean Air Jumbos	36	18	18	55	0.986	0.984	
5	Cheonan Hyundai Skywalkers	36	15	21	52	0.904	0.995	
6	Gumi LIG Greaters	36	13	23	36	0.698	0.966	
7	Asan Woori Card Hansae	36	3	33	15	0.330	0.874	

=== League table (Female) ===
Pos	Team	Pld	W	L	Pts	SR	SPR	Qualification
1	Seongnam Korea Expressway Hi-pass	30	20	10	59	1.511	1.062	Finals
2	Hwaseong IBK Altos	30	20	10	56	1.447	1.089	Semifinals
3	Suwon Hyundai Hillstate	30	19	11	56	1.438	1.062	Semifinals
4	Incheon Heungkuk Life Pink Spiders	30	15	15	45	1.018	0.985	
5	Pyeongtaek GS Caltex KIXX	30	8	22	28	0.592	0.941	
6	Daejeon KGC	30	8	22	26	0.521	0.879	

== Play-offs ==
=== Bracket (Male) ===
Semifinals
1	Daejeon Samsung Bluefangs
2	Ansan Rush & Cash	3	3
3	Suwon KEPCO Vixtorm	2	2

Finals
1	Daejeon Samsung Bluefangs	0	0	1
2	Ansan Rush & Cash	3	3	3

=== Bracket (Female) ===
Semifinals
1	Seongnam Korea Expressway Hi-pass
2	Hwaseong IBK Altos	3	3
3	Suwon Hyundai Hillstate	1	1

Finals
1	Seongnam Korea Expressway Hi-pass	0	1	0
2	Hwaseong IBK Altos	3	3	3

== Top Scorers ==
=== Men's ===
Rank	Player	Club	Points
1	(Cuba) Leonardo Leyva	Daejeon Samsung Bluefangs	1282
2	(Cuba) Robertlandy Simon	Ansan OK Savings Bank Rush & Cash	1043
3	(Australia) Thomas Edgar	Gumi LIG Greaters	1034
4	(Cuba) Michael Sánchez	Incheon Korean Air Jumbos	1026
5	(Greece) Mitar Tzourits	Suwon KEPCO Vixtorm	953
6	(South Korea) Mun Seong-min	Cheonan Hyundai Capital Skywalkers	640
7	(France) Kevin Le Roux	Cheonan Hyundai Capital Skywalkers	572
8	(South Korea) Jeon Gwang-in	Suwon KEPCO Vixtorm	539
9	(South Korea) Kim Yo-han	Gumi LIG Greaters	474
10	(South Korea) Song Myeong-geun	Ansan OK Savings Bank Rush & Cash	442

=== Women's ===
Rank	Player	Club	Points
1	(Azerbaijan) Polina Rahimova	Suwon Hyundai Hillstate	982
2	(Brazil) Joyce Gomes da Silva	Daejeon KGC	925
3	(United States) Nicole Fawcett	Seongnam Korea Expressway Hi-pass	896
4	(United States) Rachel Rourke	Incheon Heungkuk Life Pink Spiders	789
5	(United States) Destinee Hooker	Hwaseong IBK Altos	760
6	(South Korea) Kim Hee-jin	Hwaseong IBK Altos	450
7	(Canada) Sarah Pavan	Pyeongtaek GS Caltex KIXX	424
8	(United States) Hayley Jordan Ackerman	Pyeongtaek GS Caltex KIXX	398
9	(South Korea) Park Jeong-ah	Hwaseong IBK Altos	391
10	(South Korea) Lee Jae-yeong	Incheon Heungkuk Life Pink Spiders	374

== Player of the Round ==
=== Men's ===
Round	Player	Club
1	(Hungary) Robertlandy Simon	Ansan OK Savings Bank Rush & Cash
2	(Cuba) Leonardo Leyva	Daejeon Samsung Bluefangs
3	(Hungary) Robertlandy Simon	Ansan OK Savings Bank Rush & Cash
4	(South Korea) Jeon Gwang-in	Suwon KEPCO Vixtorm
5	(South Korea) Jeon Gwang-in	Suwon KEPCO Vixtorm
6	(South Korea) Yu Gwang-wu	Daejeon Samsung Bluefangs

=== Women's ===
Round	Player	Club
1	(Azerbaijan) Polina Rahimova	Suwon Hyundai Hillstate
2	(Azerbaijan) Polina Rahimova	Suwon Hyundai Hillstate
3	(United States) Destinee Hooker	Hwaseong IBK Altos
4	(South Korea) Mun Jeong-won	Seongnam Korea Expressway Hi-pass
5	(United States) Nicole Fawcett	Seongnam Korea Expressway Hi-pass
6	(South Korea) Lee Jae-yeong	Incheon Heungkuk Life Pink Spiders

== Final standing ==
=== Men's League ===
Rank	Team
1st place, gold medalist(s)	Ansan Rush & Cash
2nd place, silver medalist(s)	Daejeon Samsung Bluefangs
3rd place, bronze medalist(s)	Suwon KEPCO Vixtorm
4	Incheon Korean Air Jumbos
5	Cheonan Hyundai Capital Skywalkers
6	Uijeongbu KB Insurance Stars
7	Seoul Woori Card Hansae

=== Women's League ===
Rank	Team
1st place, gold medalist(s)	Hwaseong IBK Altos
2nd place, silver medalist(s)	Seongnam Korea Expressway Hi-pass
3rd place, bronze medalist(s)	Suwon Hyundai Hillstate
4	Incheon Heungkuk Life Pink Spiders
5	Pyeongtaek GS Caltex KIXX
6	Daejeon KGC
