= Volleyball at the 2019 Pan American Games =

- Volleyball pictogram
- Venue: Sports Centre VRDC
- Dates: August 2–11, 2019
- No. of events: 2 (1 men, 1 women)
- Competitors: 192

Volleyball competitions at the 2019 Pan American Games in Lima, Peru are scheduled to be held from August 2 to 11. The venue for the competition is the Sports Centre VRDC located at the Villa Deportiva Regional del Callao cluster. The venue will also host the taekwondo competitions. A total of eight men's and eight women's teams (each consisting up to 12 athletes) competed in each tournament. This means a total of 192 athletes are scheduled to compete.

== Qualification ==
A total of eight men's teams and eight women's team qualified to compete at the games in each tournament. The host nation (Peru) received automatic qualification in both tournaments. All other teams qualified through various tournaments. The North and South American qualification tournaments were held with teams competing (and not qualifying) at the respective Pan American Cups, plus any possible invited teams. The last slot could also be awarded to a team.

=== Men ===
| Event | Dates | Location | Vacancies | Qualified |
|---|---|---|---|---|
| Host Nation | —N/a | —N/a | 1 | Peru |
| 2018 Men's Pan-American Volleyball Cup | 28 August–2 September | (Mexico) Córdoba | 5 | Argentina; Brazil; Cuba; Puerto Rico; Mexico |
| 2019 Men's Pan-American Volleyball Cup | 16–21 June | (Mexico) Colima City | 2 | United States; Chile |
| Total | | | 8 | |

=== Women ===
| Event | Dates | Location | Vacancies | Qualified |
|---|---|---|---|---|
| Host Nation | —N/a | —N/a | 1 | Peru |
| 2018 Women's Pan-American Volleyball Cup | 8–14 July | (Dominican Republic) Santo Domingo | 5 | United States; Dominican Republic; Canada; Brazil; Colombia |
| North American Qualification Tournament | 4–6 January 2019 | (Puerto Rico) San Juan | 1 | Puerto Rico |
| FIVB World Rankings | - | - | 1 | Argentina |
| Total | | | 8 | |

== Participating nations ==
Eleven countries qualified volleyball teams. The numbers of participants qualified are in parentheses.

- Argentina (24)
- Brazil (24)
- Canada (12)
- Chile (12)
- Colombia (12)
- Cuba (12)
- Dominican Republic (12)
- Mexico (12)
- Peru (24)
- Puerto Rico (24)
- United States (24)

== Medalists ==
| Event | Gold | Silver | Bronze |
|---|---|---|---|
| Men's tournament | Argentina; Manuel Balague; Nicolás Bruno; Gastón Fernández; Joaquín Gallego; Matías Giraudo; Facundo Imhoff; German Johansen; Jan Martínez; Franco Massimino; Luciano Palonsky; Matías Sánchez; Lisandro Zanotti | Cuba; Roamy Alonso; Javier Concepción; Yonder García; Adrián Goide; Jesús Herrera; Yohan León; Miguel López; José Massó; Osniel Mergarejo; Liván Osoria; Liván Taboada; Marlon Yant | Brazil; Aboubacar Neto; Carlos Eduardo Barreto; Cledenílson Batista; Éder Carbonera; Eduardo Sobrinho; Felipe Roque; Henrique Honorato; Lucas Lóh; Matheus Santos; Rodrigo Leão; Rogério Filho; Thiago Veloso |
| Women's tournament | Dominican Republic; Cándida Arias; Brenda Castillo; Bethania de la Cruz; Camil Domínguez; Lisvel Eve; Gaila González; Niverka Marte; Brayelin Martínez; Jineiry Martínez; Yonkaira Peña; Prisilla Rivera; Annerys Vargas | Colombia; Valerín Carabali; Amanda Coneo; Camila Gómez; María Margarita Martínez; María Alejandra Marin; Darlevis Mosquera; Ana Karina Olaya; Verónica Pasos; Melissa Rangel; Dayana Segóvia; Juliana Toro; Angie Velásquez | Argentina; Tanya Acosta; Daniela Bulaich; Antonela Fortuna; Lucía Fresco; Valentina Galiano; Candelaria Herrera; Julieta Lazcano; Victoria Mayer; Agnes Michel; Paula Nizetich; Tatiana Rizzo; Elina Rodríguez |

== See also ==
- Volleyball at the 2020 Summer Olympics
