= Felipe Roque (volleyball) =

Brazilian volleyball player (born 1997)

Personal information
- Full name: Felipe Moreira Roque
- Nationality: (Brazil) Brazilian
- Born: 19 May 1997 (age 29); Juiz de Fora, MG, Brazil
- Height: 2.12 m (6 ft 11 in)
- Weight: 118 kg (260 lb)
- Spike: 362 cm (143 in)
- Block: 347 cm (137 in)

Volleyball information
- Position: Opposite
- Current club: (Brazil) Vôlei Taubaté
- Number: 19

Career
Years	Teams
2017–2020; 2020–2022; 2023 <jp> 2025-	(Brazil) Minas Tênis Clube (Brazil) Vôlei Taubaté (Brazil) Vôlei São José

National team
2019–	Brazil
Honours
Men's volleyball
Representing Brazil
FIVB World Championship
Bronze medal – third place	2022 Poland/Slovenia	Team
FIVB World Cup
Gold medal – first place	2019 Japan
Gold medal – first place	Santiago 2023	Voleibol nos Jogos Pan-Americanos de 2023Equipe
Bronze medal – third place	2019 Lima
CSV South American Championship
Gold medal – first place	2019 Chile
Silver medal – second place	2023 Recife

Felipe Moreira Roque (born 19 May 1997) is a Brazilian volleyball player. He used to be a member of the Brazil men's national volleyball team. On club level, he plays as an outside hitter for Japanese club Hiroshima Thunders.

== Sporting achievements ==
=== Clubs ===
- National championships
  - 2020/2021 Brazilian Championship, with Vôlei Taubaté

=== Youth national team ===
- 2016 CSV U21 South American Championship
- 2017 U21 Pan American Cup
