= 2007 Volleyball America's Cup =

The sixth edition of the annual Volleyball America's Cup was played by six countries from North, Central and South America from August 15 to August 19, 2007, in Manaus, Brazil.

== Main Round ==
=== Group A ===
	Team	Points	G	W	L	PW	PL	Ratio	SW	SL	Ratio
1.	United States	4	2	2	0	170	135	1.259	6	1	6.000
2.	Argentina	3	2	1	1	168	193	0.870	3	5	0.600
3.	Canada	2	2	0	2	200	210	0.952	3	6	0.500

- Wednesday August 15

United States	3 – 1	Canada	25-18 20-25 25-16 25-23

- Thursday August 16

United States	3 – 0	Argentina	25-20 25-14 25-19

- Friday August 17

Argentina	3 – 2	Canada	23-25 25-23 36-34 16-25 15-11

=== Group B ===
	Team	Points	G	W	L	PW	PL	Ratio	SW	SL	Ratio
1.	Brazil	4	2	2	0	150	109	1.376	6	0	MAX
2.	Cuba	3	2	1	1	139	126	1.103	3	3	1.000
3.	Dominican R.	2	2	0	2	96	150	0.640	0	6	0.000

- Wednesday August 15

Brazil	3 – 0	Dominican R.	25-17 25-08 25-20

- Thursday August 16

Brazil	3 – 0	Cuba	25-23 25-22 25-19

- Friday August 17

Cuba	3 – 0	Dominican R.	25-15 25-20 25-16

== Final round ==
Semi-finals
2007-08-18 – Manaus, Brazil
Brazil	3
Argentina	0
2007-08-18 – Manaus, Brazil
United States	3
Cuba	0

Final
2007-08-19 – Manaus, Brazil
Brazil	2
United States	3
3rd place
2007-08-19 – Manaus, Brazil
Argentina	1
Cuba	3

=== Semi-finals ===
- Saturday 2007-08-18

Brazil	3 – 0	Argentina	25-13 25-18 25-16
United States	3 – 0	Cuba	25-23 25-15 25-20

=== Finals ===
- Saturday 2007-08-18 — Fifth Place Match

Canada	3 – 1	Dominican R.	19-25 26-24 25-16 25-20

- Sunday 2007-08-19 — Bronze Medal Match

Cuba	3 – 1	Argentina	25-23 28-30 25-17 25-22

- Sunday 2007-08-19 — Gold Medal Match

Brazil	2 – 3	United States	16-25 23-25 25-19 25-21 17-19

== Final ranking ==
Place	Team
1.	United States
2.	Brazil
3.	Cuba
4.	Argentina
5.	Canada
6.	Dominican Republic

2007 America's Cup champions

United States
Second title

== Awards ==
- Most valuable player
  - Roberlandy Simon (CUB)

- Best spiker
  - Roberlandy Simon (CUB)

- Best server
  - Lucas Saatkamp (BRA)

- Best blocker
  - Roberlandy Simon (CUB)
- Best scorer
  - Lucas Chávez (ARG)

- Best digger
  - Chris Wolfenden (CAN)

- Best setter
  - Bruno Rezende (BRA)

- Best receiver
  - William Priddy (USA)
