= Liván Taboada =

Cuban volleyball player (born 1998)

Personal information
- Nationality: Cuban
- Born: 4 October 1998 (age 28)
- Height: 1.91 m (6 ft 3 in)
- Weight: 75 kg (165 lb)
- Spike: 343 cm (135 in)
- Block: 327 cm (129 in)

Volleyball information
- Position: Setter
- Current club: (Switzerland) Schönenwerd
- Number: 11 (national team)

Career
| Years | Teams |
|---|---|
| 2017–2021; 2021–2023; 2023–2024; 2024–2026; 2026; 2026– | (Cuba) La Habana (Romania) Știința Explorări Baia Mare (Romania) SCM Zalău (Indonesia) Surabaya BIN Samator (Indonesia) Jakarta Garuda (Switzerland) Schönenwerd |

National team
| 2018–present | Cuba |
Medal record
Men's volleyball
Representing Cuba
Pan American Games
| Silver medal – second place | 2019 Lima | Team |

Liván Taboada Diaz (born 4 October 1998) is a Cuban volleyball player, a member of the club Schönenwerd.

== Sporting achievements ==
=== National team ===
Men's Junior Pan-American Cup:

- 2017

FIVB Men's U21 World Championship:

- 2017

FIVB Men's U23 World Championship:

- 2017

Pan American Cup:

- 2019, 2022
- 2018

Men's U23 Pan-American Cup:

- 2018

Pan American Games:

- 2019
