= Jean Patrice Ndaki Mboulet =

Cameroonian volleyball player (born 1979)

Jean Patrice Ndaki Mboulet (born May 5, 1979) is a Cameroonian volleyball player. He stands 2.01 metres (6 ft 7 in), and plays striker. Mboulet has a total of 240 caps for Cameroon. His younger brother, Yves Marcel Ndaki Mboulet, is also a volleyball player.

== Biography ==
In 2000, he was named MVP of the Cameroon League while playing for Port Douala. In 2002, he moved to France, where he played for four clubs. During the 2002–03 season, he played for AS Fréjus; from 2003 to 2005, he played for Montpellier UC, then joined AS Cannes, with whom he reached the French Cup final in 2006. During the 2006–07 season, he represented Saint-Brieuc Côtes-d'Armor Volley-Ball (Pro A). In 2007, he joined the Japanese club Sakai Blazers. In 2008, he received the V-League Best Player award, and in 2009, he was selected for the sixth season.
