= 2022 Men's Pan-American Volleyball Cup =

15th edition of the annual men's volleyball tournament

Tournament details
- Host country: Canada
- Dates: 9–14 August
- Teams: 8
- Venue: 1 (in 1 host city)

Final positions
- Champions: Cuba (4th title)
- Runners-up: Canada
- Third place: United States
- Fourth place: Chile

Tournament awards
- MVP: (Cuba) Osniel Melgarejo

The 2022 Men's Pan-American Volleyball Cup was the 15th edition of the annual men's volleyball tournament. It was held in Gatineau, Quebec, Canada, from 9 August to 14 August. Eight teams competed in the tournament.

== Competing nations ==
Group A	Group B
Chile; Cuba; Dominican Republic; United States	Brazil; Canada; Mexico; Puerto Rico

== Competition format ==
The competition format for the Pan-American Volleyball Cup divides the eight participating teams in two groups of four teams each.

The best team from Group A and Group B will advance to the semifinals, the second and third teams from Group B will play the quarterfinals against the second and third teams from Pool A. The remaining teams will play for the 5th to 8th placement matches.

=== Pool standing procedure ===
Match won 3–0: 5 points for the winner, 0 point for the loser
Match won 3–1: 4 points for the winner, 1 points for the loser
Match won 3–2: 3 points for the winner, 2 points for the loser
In case of tie, the teams were classified according to the following criteria:
points ratio and sets ratio

== Preliminary round ==
- All times are Eastern Daylight Time (UTC−04:00).

=== Group A ===
Pos	Team	Pld	W	L	Pts	SPW	SPL	SPR	SW	SL	SR	Qualification
1	Cuba	3	3	0	15	228	186	1.226	9	0	MAX	Semifinals
2	United States	3	2	1	10	210	197	1.066	6	3	2.000	Play-offs
3	Chile	3	1	2	4	212	238	0.891	3	7	0.429	Play-offs
4	Dominican Republic	3	0	3	1	217	246	0.882	1	9	0.111	5th–8th classification

Date	Time		Score		Set 1	Set 2	Set 3	Set 4	Set 5	Total	Report
9 Aug	11:30	Dominican Republic	0–3	United States	23–25	23–25	23–25			69–75	P2 P3
9 Aug	17:00	Chile	0–3	Cuba	17–25	20–25	26–28			63–78	P2 P3
10 Aug	11:30	Cuba	3–0	Dominican Republic	25–21	25–21	25–21			75–63	P2 P3
10 Aug	17:00	United States	3–0	Chile	25–22	25–17	25–14			75–53	P2 P3
11 Aug	11:30	Chile	3–1	Dominican Republic	21–25	25–22	25–23	25–15		96–85	P2 P3
11 Aug	17:00	United States	0–3	Cuba	21–25	20–25	19–25			60–75	P2 P3

=== Group B ===
Pos	Team	Pld	W	L	Pts	SPW	SPL	SPR	SW	SL	SR	Qualification
1	Canada	3	2	1	10	288	250	1.152	8	5	1.600	Semifinals
2	Mexico	3	2	1	9	291	297	0.980	8	6	1.333	Play-offs
3	Puerto Rico	3	2	1	7	260	260	1.000	6	6	1.000	Play-offs
4	Brazil	3	0	3	4	268	300	0.893	4	9	0.444	5th–8th classification

Date	Time		Score		Set 1	Set 2	Set 3	Set 4	Set 5	Total	Report
9 Aug	14:00	Brazil	1–3	Puerto Rico	21–25	18–25	25–21	25–27		89–98	P2 P3
9 Aug	19:30	Canada	2–3	Mexico	25–23	25–13	21–25	23–25	11–15	105–101	P2 P3
10 Aug	14:00	Brazil	1–3	Mexico	25–19	20–25	18–25	19–25		82–94	P2 P3
10 Aug	19:30	Canada	3–0	Puerto Rico	25–17	25–17	25–18			75–52	P2 P3
11 Aug	14:00	Mexico	2–3	Puerto Rico	14–25	15–25	25–21	25–20	17–19	96–110	P2 P3
11 Aug	19:30	Canada	3–2	Brazil	22–25	25–20	21–25	25–20	15–7	108–97	P2 P3

== Final round ==
- All times are Eastern Daylight Time (UTC−04:00).

Play-offs
12 August – Gatineau
Mexico	2
Chile	3
12 August – Gatineau
United States	3
Puerto Rico	0

Semifinals
13 August – Gatineau
Cuba	3
Chile	0
13 August – Gatineau
Canada	3
United States	2

Final
14 August – Gatineau
Cuba	3
Canada	0
3rd place match
14 August – Gatineau
Chile	1
United States	3

5th–8th classification
13 August – Gatineau
Brazil	0
Puerto Rico	3
13 August – Gatineau
Dominican Republic	1
Mexico	3

5th place match
14 August – Gatineau
Puerto Rico	3
Mexico	1
7th place match
14 August – Gatineau
Brazil	2
Dominican Republic	3

=== Play-offs ===
Date	Time		Score		Set 1	Set 2	Set 3	Set 4	Set 5	Total	Report
12 Aug	17:00	Mexico	2–3	Chile	25–17	17–25	21–25	26–24	14–16	103–107	P2 P3
12 Aug	19:30	United States	3–0	Puerto Rico	25–17	29–27	26–24			80–68	P2 P3

=== 5th–8th classification ===
Date	Time		Score		Set 1	Set 2	Set 3	Set 4	Set 5	Total	Report
13 Aug	11:30	Brazil	0–3	Puerto Rico	23–25	22–25	19–25			64–75	P2 P3
13 Aug	14:00	Dominican Republic	1–3	Mexico	14–25	29–27	18–25	15–25		76–102	P2 P3

=== Semifinals ===
Date	Time		Score		Set 1	Set 2	Set 3	Set 4	Set 5	Total	Report
13 Aug	17:00	Cuba	3–0	Chile	25–16	25–20	25–21			75–57	P2 P3
13 Aug	19:30	Canada	3–2	United States	22–25	21–25	29–27	25–23	15–12	112–112	P2 P3

=== 7th place match ===
Date	Time		Score		Set 1	Set 2	Set 3	Set 4	Set 5	Total	Report
14 Aug	9:00	Brazil	2–3	Dominican Republic	23–25	25–22	17–25	25–18	10–15	100–105	P2 P3

=== 5th place match ===
Date	Time		Score		Set 1	Set 2	Set 3	Set 4	Set 5	Total	Report
14 Aug	11:30	Puerto Rico	3–1	Mexico	26–24	25–27	25–23	25–19		101–93	P2 P3

=== 3rd place match ===
Date	Time		Score		Set 1	Set 2	Set 3	Set 4	Set 5	Total	Report
14 Aug	14:30	Chile	1–3	United States	16–25	15–25	25–22	21–25		77–97	P2 P3

=== Final ===
Date	Time		Score		Set 1	Set 2	Set 3	Set 4	Set 5	Total	Report
14 Aug	17:00	Cuba	3–0	Canada	25–17	25–17	25–23			75–57	P2 P3

== Final standing ==
Rank	Team
1st place, gold medalist(s)	Cuba
2nd place, silver medalist(s)	Canada
3rd place, bronze medalist(s)	United States
4	Chile
5	Puerto Rico
6	Mexico
7	Dominican Republic
8	Brazil

2022 Men's Pan-American Cup champions

Cuba
4th title

14–man roster
Miguel Ángel López (c), Jaime Herrera, Osniel Melgarejo, Julio Cárdenas, Michael Sánchez, Javier Concepción, Yonder García, Liván Osoria, Miguel Gutiérrez, Lyvan Taboada, Robertlandy Simón, Adrián Goide, Roamy Alonso, Marlon Yant
Head coach
Nicolás Vives

== Awards ==
- Most valuable player
  Osniel Melgarejo (CUB)
- Best scorer
  Vicente Parraguirre (CHI)
- Best outside hitters
  Osniel Melgarejo (CUB)
  Vicente Parraguirre (CHI)
- Best middle blockers
  Nyerovwome Omene (USA)
  Thiery Nascimento (BRA)
- Best setter
  Luke Herr (CAN)
- Best Opposite
  Jaime Herrera (CUB)
- Best libero
  Yonder García (CUB)
- Best digger
  Mason Briggs (USA)
- Best receiver
  Yonder García (CUB)
- Best server
  Miguel Ángel López (CUB)

== See also ==
- 2022 Women's Pan-American Volleyball Cup
