= Jan Klobučar =

Slovenian volleyball player (born 1992)

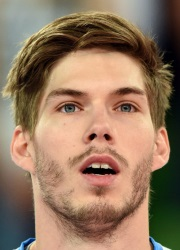
- Klobučar in 2019

Personal information
- Nationality: Slovenian
- Born: 11 December 1992 (age 33); Celje, Slovenia
- Height: 1.95 m (6 ft 5 in)
- Weight: 89 kg (196 lb)
- Spike: 345 cm (136 in)
- Block: 329 cm (130 in)

Volleyball information
- Position: Right side hitter
- Current club: Virtus Volley Fano

Career
Years	Teams
–2010; 2010–2011; 2011–2015; 2015–2017; 2017–2018; 2018–2019; 2019–2020; 2020–2024; 2024–	Šoštanj; Fram; ACH Volley; United Volleys Rhein-Main; MKS Będzin; Gas Sales Piacenza; Narbonne Volley; Calcit Volley; Virtus Volley Fano

National team
2012–	Slovenia
Honours
Men's volleyball
Representing Slovenia
European Championship
Silver medal – second place	2015 Bulgaria/Italy
Silver medal – second place	2019 France/Slovenia/Belgium/Netherlands
Silver medal – second place	2021 Poland/Czech Republic/Estonia/Finland
European League
Gold medal – first place	2015 Poland

Jan Klobučar (born 11 December 1992) is a Slovenian male volleyball player. He is a member of the Slovenia national team. At club level, he played for United Volleys Rhein-Main in Germany from 2015 to 2017.

== Honours ==
=== National team ===
- 2015 (gold) Men's European Volleyball League
- 2015 (silver) Men's European Volleyball Championship
- 2019 (silver) Men's European Volleyball Championship
- 2021 (silver) Men's European Volleyball Championship
