= Michael Sánchez =

Cuban volleyball player (born 1986)

Personal information
- Full name: Michael Sánchez Bozhulev
- Nationality: Cuban / Russian
- Born: 5 June 1986 (age 40); Poltava, Soviet Union
- Height: 2.06 m (6 ft 9 in)
- Weight: 100 kg (220 lb)
- Spike: 365 cm (144 in)
- Block: 340 cm (130 in)

Volleyball information
- Position: Opposite Spiker
- Current club: (Brazil) Minas Tênis Clube
- Number: 11

Career
Years	Teams
2009; 2011–2012; 2012–2013; 2013–	Al-Rayyan Sports Club (Russia) Lokomotiv Novosibirsk (Russia) Fakel Novy Urengoy (South Korea) Korean Air Jumbos

National team
2006–2009	Cuba
Honours
Representing Cuba
Men's volleyball
Pan American Cup
Gold medal – first place	2022 Gatineau
Pan American Games
Bronze medal – third place	2007 Rio de Janeiro	Team

Michael Sánchez Bozhulev (born 5 June 1986) is a Cuban Ukrainian volleyball player who plays for the Cuban men's national volleyball team. He is a member of the national squad that claimed the bronze medal at the 2007 Pan American Games in Rio de Janeiro, Brazil. He also won the silver medal with Al Rayyan in the 2014 World club championship. After the 2007 Pan American Games in Rio de Janeiro he had a major injury, but he recuperated and continued his career.
