= Jesús Rangel =

Mexican volleyball player (born 1980)

Personal information
- Nationality: Mexican
- Born: 20 September 1980 (age 46)
- Height: 1.93 m (6 ft 4 in)
- Weight: 82 kg (181 lb)
- Spike: 337 cm (133 in)
- Block: 330 cm (130 in)

Volleyball information
- Number: 5

Career
Years	Teams
2014	(Mexico) Halcones

National team
2014	Mexico

Jesús Rangel (born 20 September 1980) is a Mexican male volleyball player. He was part of the Mexico men's national volleyball team at the 2014 FIVB Volleyball Men's World Championship in Poland. He currently plays for Tigres UANL.

== Clubs ==
- CV Zaragoza (2008–2010)
- Palma Voley (2010–2011)
- Tigres UANL (2013–2014)
- Halcones (2014–2016)
- Unicaja Costa de Almería (2017–2018)
- Tigres UANL (2018–2020)
