= Robertlandy Simón =

Cuban volley player

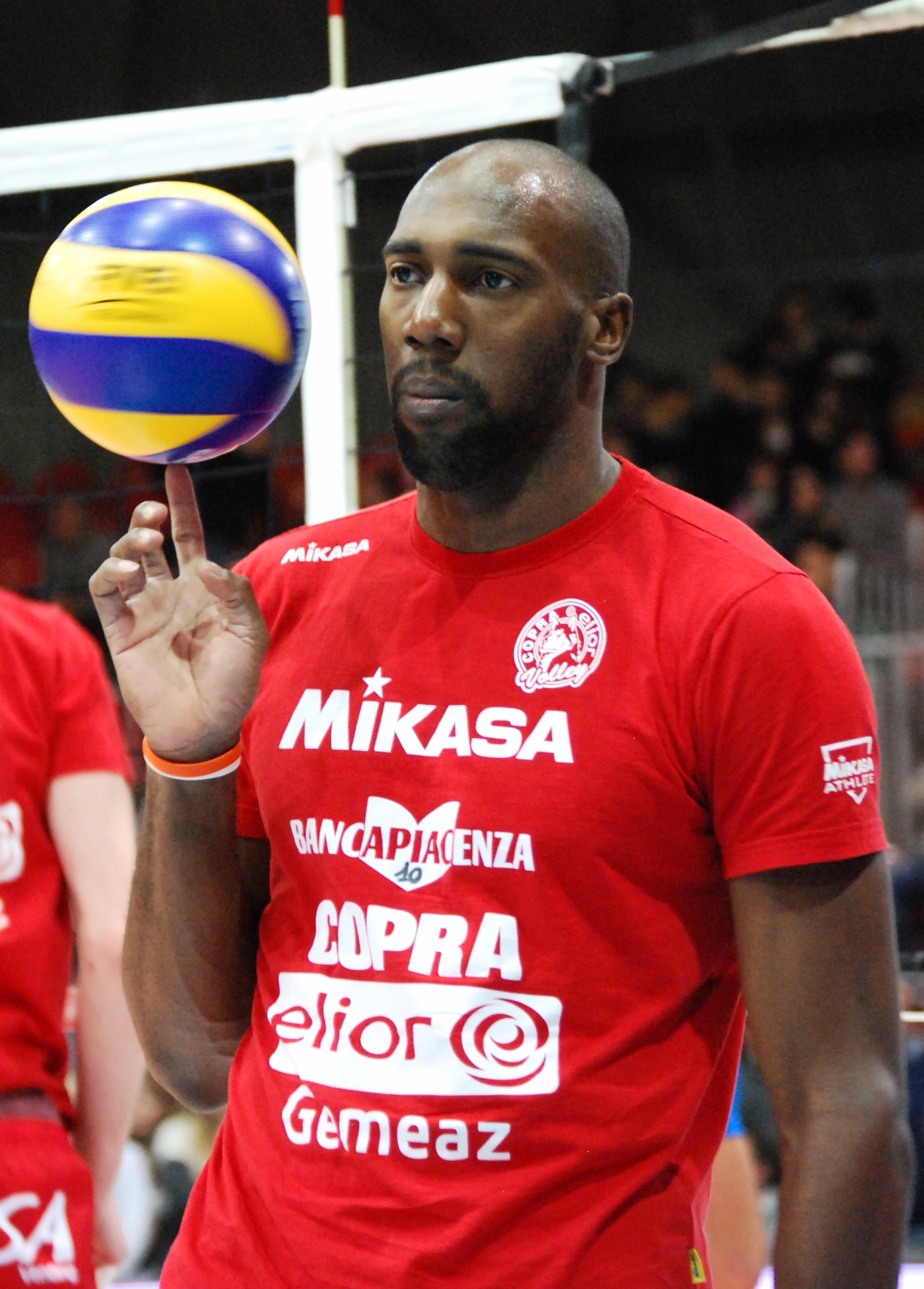

Personal information
- Full name: Robertlandy Simón Aties
- Born: June 11, 1987 (age 39); Guantánamo, Cuba
- Height: 2.08 m (6 ft 10 in)
- Weight: 114 kg (251 lb)
- Spike: 389 cm (153 in)
- Block: 362 cm (143 in)

Volleyball information
- Position: Middle blocker
- Current club: Jakarta Bhayangkara Presisi
- Number: 13

Career
| Years | Teams |
|---|---|
| 2005–2010; 2012–2014; 2014–2015; 2014–2016; 2016–2018; 2018–2022; 2022–2026; 2026– | Ciudad Habana; Copra Elior Piacenza; Al-Rayyan; OK Savings Bank / OKman; Sada Cruzeiro; Cucine Lube Civitanova; Gas Sales Bluenergy Piacenza; Jakarta Bhayangkara Presisi |

National team
| 2005–2010; 2019– | Cuba |
Honours
Representing Cuba
Men's volleyball
World Championship
| Silver medal – second place | 2010 Italy |
World League
| Bronze medal – third place | 2005 Belgrade |
Pan-American Cup
| Gold medal – first place | 2022 Gatineau |
NORCECA Championship
| Gold medal – first place | 2009 Bayamón |
| Gold medal – first place | 2019 Winnipeg |
| Bronze medal – third place | 2007 Anaheim |
- Last updated: 16 May 2026

Robertlandy Simón Aties (born 11 June 1987) is a Cuban volleyball player who is a member of the Cuban national volleyball team. He played with the Cuban national team from 2005 to 2010, and rejoined the team in 2019. He currently plays for the Indonesian club Jakarta Bhayangkara Presisi. He has won the 2009 NORCECA Championship, was a silver medalist of the 2010 World Championship, and twice was a South Korean V-League Champion (2015, 2016).

== Career ==
Simón debuted in the national team aged 17. He was the Cuban national team captain for five years. In 2009, he won individual awards at 2009 World Grand Champions Cup. In 2010, Cuba, including Simón, made it to the finale of 2010 World Championship and lost to Brazil. He was selected as the Best Blocker of the tournament.

Simón was champion of the Italian Cup 2013/14 and of the Challenge Cup 2012/13 with Piacenza. He was among the best middle blockers in the world when he left Cuba in 2010 right after the 2010 World Championship, to pursue his dreams and make a decent living overseas. Simon helped Al Rayyan to win the 2014 Club World Championship. He was the most expensive player in the South Korean League from 2014 to 2016. Simon joined Brazilian club Sada Cruzeiro in 2016. In May 2026, Simón officially joined Indonesian club Jakarta Bhayangkara Presisi to compete in the Men's AVC Champions League 2026 held in Pontianak.

== Spike height ==
Simón touched 384 cm and, according to his coach, has reached a record of 389 cm. This happened during the athletic test for the Piacenza team at Serie A1.

== Sporting achievements ==
=== Clubs ===
==== CEV Champions League ====
- 2018/2019 – with Cucine Lube Civitanova

==== CEV Challenge Cup ====
- 2012/2013 – with Copra Elior Piacenza

==== FIVB Club World Championship ====
- Belo Horizonte 2014 – with Al Rayyan
- Betim 2016 – with Sada Cruzeiro
- Poland 2017 – with Sada Cruzeiro
- Poland 2018 – with Cucine Lube Civitanova
- Betim 2019 – with Cucine Lube Civitanova
- Betim 2021 – with Cucine Lube Civitanova

==== South American Club Championship ====
- Montes Claros 2017 – with Sada Cruzeiro
- Montes Claros 2018 – with Sada Cruzeiro

==== National championships ====
- 2005/2006 Cuban Championship
- 2008/2009 Cuban Championship
- 2009/2010 Cuban Championship
- 2013/2014 Italian Cup, with Copra Elior Piacenza
- 2014/2015 South Korean Championship, with Ansan OK Savings Bank
- 2015/2016 South Korean Championship, with Ansan OK Savings Bank
- 2016/2017 Brazilian Superliga, with Sada Cruzeiro
- 2017/2018 Brazilian Superliga, with Sada Cruzeiro
- 2018/2019 Italian Championship, with Cucine Lube Civitanova
- 2019/2020 Italian Cup, with Cucine Lube Civitanova
- 2020/2021 Italian Cup, with Cucine Lube Civitanova
- 2022/2023 Italian Cup, with Gas Sales Bluenergy Piacenza

=== National team ===
- 2005 U21 World Championship
- 2005 FIVB World League
- 2005 America's Cup
- 2006 Central American and Caribbean Games
- 2007 NORCECA Championship
- 2007 Pan American Games
- 2007 America's Cup
- 2008 America's Cup
- 2009 NORCECA Championship
- 2009 FIVB World Grand Champions Cup
- 2010 FIVB World Championship
- 2019 NORCECA Champions Cup
- 2019 NORCECA Championship

=== Individually ===
- 2007 Pan American Games – Best Blocker
- 2007 America's Cup – Best Spiker
- 2007 America's Cup – Best Blocker
- 2008 America's Cup – Best Spiker
- 2008 America's Cup – Best Scorer
- 2009 FIVB World League – Best Spiker
- 2009 FIVB World League – Best Blocker
- 2009 NORCECA Championship – Best Blocker
- 2009 FIVB World Grand Champions Cup – Best Blocker
- 2009 FIVB World Grand Champions Cup – Best Server
- 2009 FIVB World Grand Champions Cup – Most Valuable Player
- 2010 FIVB World Championship – Best Blocker
- 2014 FIVB Club World Championship – Best Middle Blocker
- 2015 South Korean Championship – Best 7
- 2015 Korea-Japan Top Match – Most Valuable Player
- 2016 South Korean Championship – Finals Most Valuable Player
- 2017 FIVB Club World Championship – Best Middle Blocker
- 2018 FIVB Club World Championship – Best Middle Blocker
- 2019 NORCECA Champions Cup – Best Middle Blocker
- 2019 NORCECA Champions Cup – Most Valuable Player
- 2019 FIVB Club World Championship – Best Middle Blocker
- 2021 Italian Volleyball Cup – Most Valuable Player

Awards
| Preceded by (Brazil) Gustavo Endres | Best Blocker of Pan American Games; 2007 | Succeeded by (Argentina) Sebastian Sole |
| Preceded by (Argentina) Santiago Darraidou | Best Blocker of America's Cup; 2007 | Succeeded by (Brazil) Éder Carbonera |
| Preceded by (United States) Riley Salmon | Best Spiker of America's Cup; 2007; 2008 | Succeeded by – |
| Preceded by (Argentina) Lucas Chávez | Best Scorer of America's Cup; 2008 | Succeeded by – |
| Preceded by (Brazil) Dante Amaral | Best Spiker of FIVB World League; 2009 | Succeeded by (Russia) Maxim Mikhaylov |
| Preceded by (Serbia) Marko Podraščanin | Best Blocker of FIVB World League; 2009 | Succeeded by (Russia) Dmitriy Muserskiy |
| Preceded by (Canada) Murray Grapentine | Best Blocker of NORCECA Championship; 2009 | Succeeded by (United States) David Lee |
| Preceded by (United States) Ryan Millar | Best Blocker of FIVB World Grand Champions Cup; 2009 | Succeeded by (United States) Maxwell Holt (Italy) Emanuele Birarelli |
| Preceded by (Egypt) Abdalla Ahmed | Best Server of FIVB World Grand Champions Cup; 2009 | Succeeded by – |
| Preceded by (Brazil) André Nascimento | Most Valuable Player of FIVB World Grand Champions Cup; 2009 | Succeeded by (Russia) Dmitriy Muserskiy |
| Preceded by (Russia) Aleksey Kuleshov | Best Blocker of FIVB World Championship; 2010 | Succeeded by (Poland) Karol Kłos (Germany) Marcus Böhme |
| Preceded by (Italy) Emanuele Birarelli (Italy) Matteo Burgsthaler - (Argentina) Pablo Crer (Russia) Artem Volvich | Best Middle Blocker of FIVB Club World Championship; 2014 ex aequo (Brazil) José Santos Júnior; 2017 ex aequo (Russia) Alexey Samoylenko | Succeeded by (Bulgaria) Nikolay Nikolov (Russia) Alexander Gutsalyuk - TBD |
