= Stephen Maar =

Canadian volleyball player (born 1994)

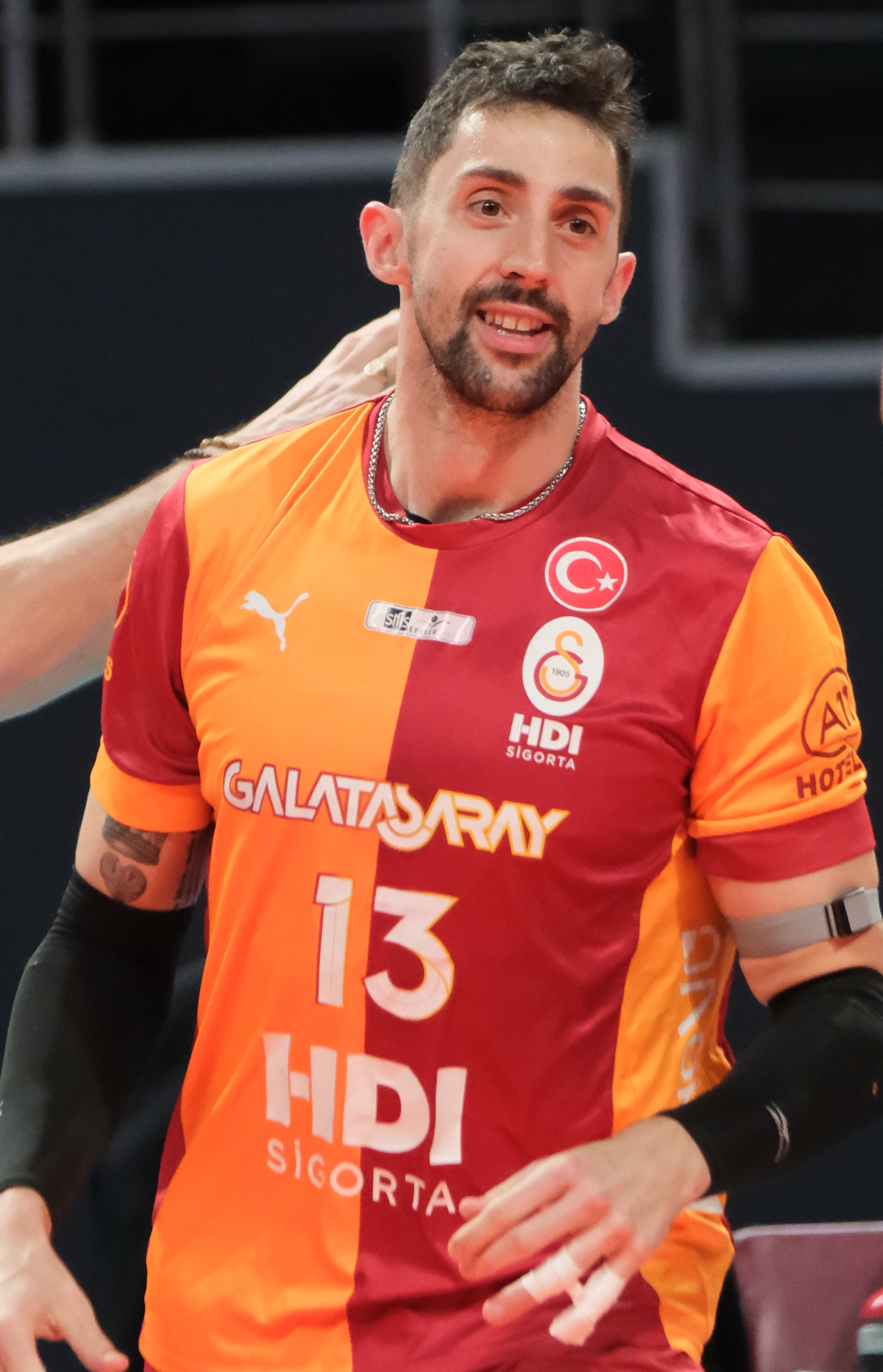

Personal information
- Full name: Stephen Timothy Maar
- Born: 6 December 1994 (age 31); Aurora, Ontario, Canada
- Height: 2.02 m (6 ft 8 in)
- Weight: 103 kg (227 lb)
- Spike: 360 cm (142 in)
- Block: 345 cm (136 in)
- Education: McMaster University

Volleyball information
- Position: Outside hitter
- Current club: Galatasaray
- Number: 13

Career
Years	Teams
2012–2016; 2016–2017; 2017–2018; 2018–2019; 2019–2020; 2020–2021; 2021–2022; 2022–2024; 2024–2025; 2025–	McMaster Marauders; Pallavolo Padova; Verona Volley; Power Volley Milano; Dynamo Moscow; Power Volley Milano; Top Volley Latina; Vero Volley Monza; Gas Sales Piacenza; Galatasaray

National team
2015–2024	Canada
Honours
Men's volleyball
Representing Canada
FIVB World League
Bronze medal – third place	2017 Curitiba
NORCECA Championship
Silver medal – second place	2023 Charleston
Bronze medal – third place	2017 Colorado Springs
Bronze medal – third place	2019 Winnipeg
Pan American Cup
Bronze medal – third place	2016 Mexico City
- Last updated: 2024-07-29

Stephen Timothy Maar (born 6 December 1994) is a Canadian professional volleyball player who plays as an outside hitter for Galatasaray.

== Career ==
=== Club team ===
He signed a 2–year contract with Galatasaray HDI Sigorta on July 25, 2025.

=== National team ===
Maar played for the Canada national team since 2015 to 2024. In June 2021, Maar was named to Canada's 2020 Olympic team.

== Honours ==
=== College ===
- Domestic
  - 2012–13 CIS Championship, with McMaster Marauders
  - 2013–14 CIS Championship, with McMaster Marauders
  - 2014–15 CIS Championship, with McMaster Marauders
  - 2015–16 CIS Championship, with McMaster Marauders

=== Club ===
- Continental
  - 2020–21 CEV Challenge Cup, with Powervolley Milano
  - 2023–24 CEV Challenge Cup, with Vero Volley Monza
- Domestic
  - 2019–20 Russian Cup, with Dynamo Moscow
  - 2023–24 Italian League, with Vero Volley Monza
  - 2023–24 Italian Cup, with Vero Volley Monza

=== Individual awards ===
- 2015: Pan American Cup – Best spiker
- 2015: Pan American Cup – Best outside spiker
- 2017: NORCECA Championship – Best outside spiker
- 2019: NORCECA Championship – Best outside spiker
- 2023: NORCECA Championship – Best outside spiker
