= Javier Concepción =

Cuban volleyball player (born 1997)

Personal information
- Full name: Javier Octavio Concepción Rojas
- Nationality: (Cuba) Cuban
- Born: 27 December 1997 (age 28); Havana, Cuba
- Height: 2.00 m (6 ft 7 in)
- Weight: 84 kg (185 lb)
- Spike: 356 cm (140 in)

Volleyball information
- Position: Middle blocker
- Current club: Iran Shahdab Yazd
- Number: 5

Career
Years	Teams
2015–2019; 2019–2020; 2020–2021; 2021–2024; 2024; 2024–2025	La Habana; Obras de San Juan; AZS Olsztyn; Stade Poitevin Poitiers; ASK Nizhny Novgorod; Shahdab Yazd

National team
Cuba
Honours
Men's volleyball
Representing Cuba
FIVB Challenger Cup
Gold medal – first place	2022 Seoul
Silver medal – second place	2019 Ljubljana
Pan American Games
Silver medal – second place	2019 Lima
Pan American Cup
Gold medal – first place	2016 Mexico City
Gold medal – first place	2019 Colima City
Gold medal – first place	2022 Gatineau
Bronze medal – third place	2017 Gatineau
Bronze medal – third place	2018 Córdoba
NORCECA Championship
Gold medal – first place	2019 Canada
Silver medal – second place	2015 Mexico

Javier Octavio Concepción Rojas (born 27 December 1997) is a Cuban volleyball player. He is part of the Cuban national team. He participated at the Olympic Games Rio 2016. At the professional club level, he plays for Stade Poitevin Poitiers.

== Clubs ==
Club history
Club	Season(s)	Position
Shahdab Yazd	2024/25	Middle-blocker
ASK Nizhny Novgorod	2024	Middle-blocker
Alterna Stade Poitevin	2021/22 – 2023/24	Middle-blocker
Indykpol AZS Olsztyn	2020/21	Middle-blocker
Obras San Juan Voley	2019/20	Middle-blocker
Leones de La Habana	2015/16 – 2018/19	Middle-blocker

== Sporting achievements ==
=== Youth national team ===
- 2017 U21 Pan American Cup
- 2017 FIVB U21 World Championship
- 2018 U23 Pan American Cup

=== Individual awards ===
- 2017: U21 Pan American Cup – Best Middle Blocker
