= Adrián Goide =

Cuban volleyball player (born 1998)

Personal information
- Full name: Adrián Eduardo Goide Arredondo
- Nationality: Cuban
- Born: 26 June 1998 (age 28)
- Height: 192 cm (6 ft 4 in)
- Weight: 80 kg (176 lb)
- Spike: 344 cm (135 in)
- Block: 340 cm (134 in)

Volleyball information
- Number: 21 (national team)

Career
Teams
	Sancti Spiritus

National team
Cuba
Honours
Representing Cuba
Pan-American Cup
Gold medal – first place	2022 Gatineau
Pan American Games
Silver medal – second place	2019 Lima	Team

Adrián Eduardo Goide Arredondo (Note: In this Spanish name, the first or paternal surname is Goide and the second or maternal family name is Arredondo.) (born 26 June 1998) is a Cuban volleyball player. He is part of the Cuba men's national volleyball team and played in the 2016 Summer Olympics. On club level he plays for Brasília Vôlei.
