= Osniel Melgarejo =

Cuban volleyball player (born 1997)

Personal information
- Full name: Osniel Lazaro Melgarejo Hernández
- Nationality: Cuban
- Born: 18 December 1997 (age 28)
- Height: 197 cm (6 ft 6 in)
- Weight: 83 kg (183 lb)
- Spike: 363 cm (143 in)
- Block: 345 cm (136 in)

Volleyball information
- Position: Outside hitter
- Current club: (Russia) Dynamo-LO
- Number: 2

Career
Years	Teams
2015–2016	(Cuba) Sancti Spiritus
2016–2017	(Greece) Panathinaikos
2017–2018	(Argentina) UNTREF Vóley
2018–2019	(Argentina) Obras San Juan
2019–2020	(Argentina) Bolivar Volley
2020–2022	(France) Chaumont VB 52
2022–2024	(Italy) Allianz Milano
2024–present	(Russia) Dynamo-LO

National team
2016–2019	Cuba U23
2015–	Cuba
Honours
Men's volleyball
Representing Cuba
Pan-American Volleyball Cup
Gold medal – first place	2016 Mexico
Gold medal – first place	2019 Mexico
Gold medal – first place	2022 Gatineau
Bronze medal – third place	2017 Canada
Bronze medal – third place	2018 Mexico
NORCECA Championship
Silver medal – second place	2015 Mexico
U23 Pan-American Volleyball Cup
Silver medal – second place	2016 Mexico
U21 NORCECA Championship
Silver medal – second place	2016 Canada
U21 Pan-American Cup
Silver medal – second place	2017 Canada
U23 Pan-American Cup
Silver medal – second place	2016 Mexico
U21 World Championship
Silver medal – second place	2017 Czech Republic
U23 World Championship
Bronze medal – third place	2017 Egypt

Osniel Lazaro Melgarejo Hernández (born 18 December 1997) is a Cuban male volleyball player. He is part of the Cuba men's national volleyball team. On club level he plays for Dynamo-LO.

== Career ==
His career started in the provincial club of Sancti Spiritus in Cuba, participating in amateur tournaments. In 2015 he received his first call from the Cuban national team, winning the silver medal at the North American championship, while a year later he won the gold medal at the Pan-American Cup and the silver one on the same tournament with the U23 team. He also competed in the 2016 Summer Olympics in Rio de Janeiro.

For the 2016-17 season he received permission from the Cuban government to play abroad, thus signing with Panathinaikos of Greece.

== Sporting achievements ==
=== National team ===
- 2016 Pan-American Volleyball Cup
- 2015 NORCECA Volleyball Championship
- 2016 U23 Pan-American Volleyball Cup
