= Yonder García =

Cuban volleyball player (born 1993)

Personal information
- Full name: Yonder Román García Álvarez
- Nationality: Cuban
- Born: 26 February 1993 (age 33)
- Height: 183 cm (6 ft 0 in)
- Weight: 78 kg (172 lb)
- Spike: 325 cm (128 in)
- Block: 320 cm (126 in)

Volleyball information
- Number: 7 (national team)

Career
- Years: Team
- 2015-2021 2021-: Ciudad Habana; Al-Ahly SC

National team
- Years: Team
- 2015-: Cuba
Honours
Representing Cuba
Pan-American Cup
Gold medal – first place	2022 Gatineau
Pan American Games
Silver medal – second place	2019 Lima	Team

Yonder Román García Álvarez (born 26 February 1993) is a Cuban volleyball player. He is part of the Cuba men's national volleyball team. On club level he plays for Angeles from CDMX.
