= Liván Osoria =

Cuban volleyball player (born 1994)

Personal information
- Full name: Liván Osoria Rodriguez
- Nationality: Cuban
- Born: 5 February 1994 (age 32)
- Height: 2.01 m (6 ft 7 in)
- Weight: 96 kg (212 lb)
- Spike: 345 cm (136 in)
- Block: 325 cm (128 in)

Volleyball information
- Current club: Cambrai-Volley
- Number: TBA

Career
| Years | Teams |
|---|---|
| 2014–2015; 2015–2016; 2017–2018; 2018–2020; 2020– | Santiago de Cuba (Argentina) Obras UDAP Vólley (Argentina) Untref Volley (Argentina) Ciudad Volley (France) Cambrai-Volley |

National team
| 2011– | Cuba |
Honours
Representing Cuba
Pan-American Cup
| Gold medal – first place | 2022 Gatineau |
Pan American Games
| Silver medal – second place | 2019 Lima | Team |

Liván Osoria Rodriguez (born 5 February 1994) is a Cuban male volleyball player. He was part of the Cuba men's national volleyball team at the 2014 FIVB Volleyball Men's World Championship in Poland.

== Clubs ==
- Santiago de Cuba (2014)
