= Giba =

Brazilian volleyball player

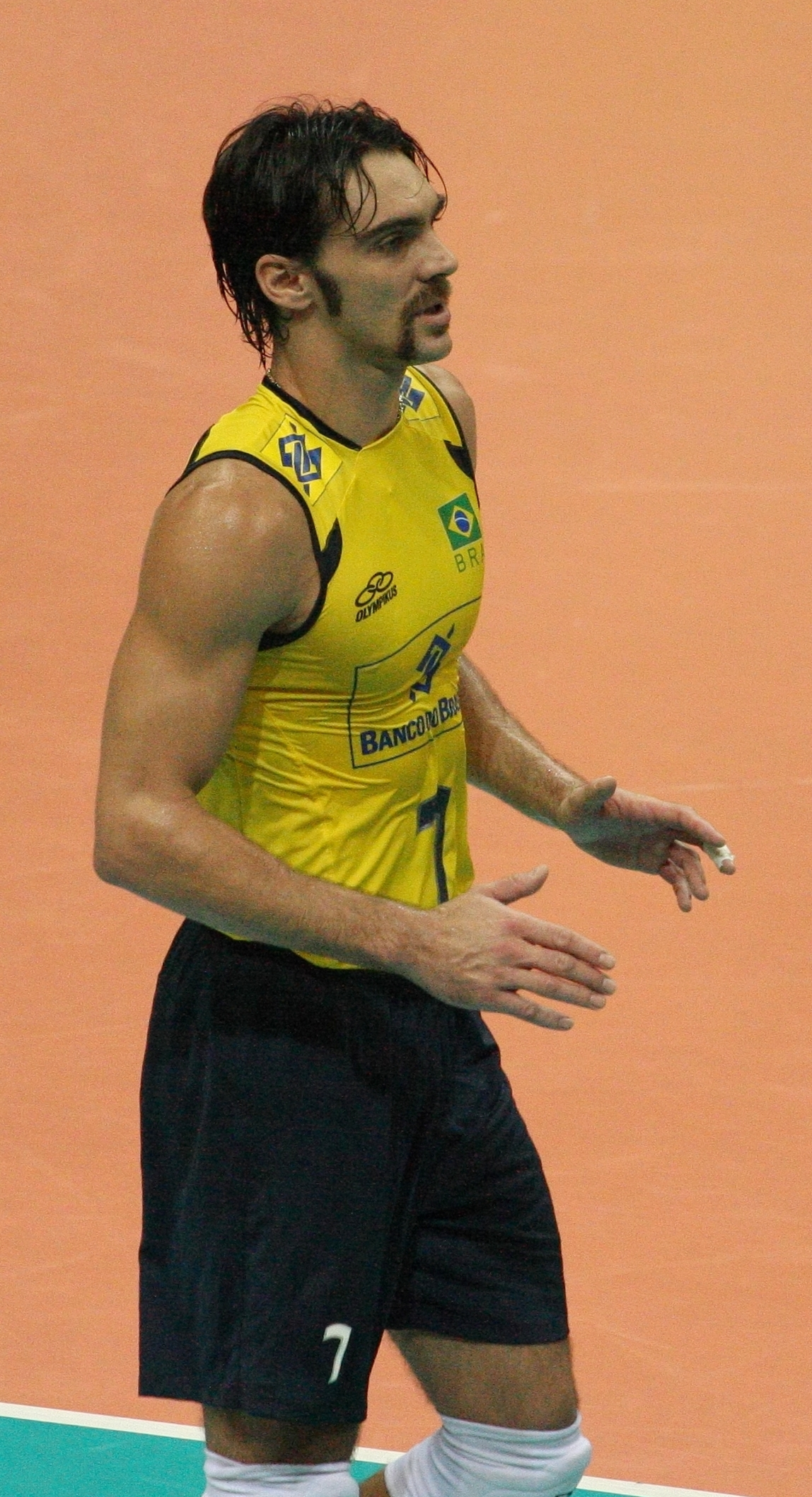
- Giba at the 2011 World League Final

Personal information
- Full name: Gilberto Amauri de Godoy Filho
- Born: 23 December 1976 (age 49); Londrina, Paraná, Brazil
- Height: 1.92 m (6 ft 4 in)
- Weight: 91 kg (201 lb)
- Spike: 325 cm (128 in)
- Block: 312 cm (123 in)

Volleyball information
- Position: Outside hitter
- Current club: Retired

Career
Years	Teams
1996–1997	Chapecó São Caetano
1997–1998	Olympikus São Caetano
1998–1999	Report Nipomed
1999–2001	Minas Tênis Clube
2001–2003	Ferrara
2003–2007	Bre Banca Lannutti Cuneo
2007–2009	Iskra Odintsovo
2009–2012	Pinheiros
2012–2013	Personal Bolívar
2013	Funvic Taubaté
2013–2014	Al-Nasr Dubai
2018–2019	IBB Polonia London

National team
1995–2012	Brazil
Honours
Men's volleyball
Representing Brazil
Event	1st	2nd	3rd
Olympic Games	1	2	0
World Championship	3	0	0
World Grand Champions Cup	3	0	0
World Cup	2	0	2
World League	8	2	2
South American Championship	9	0	0
Pan American Games	1	1	1
America's Cup	3	4	0
Total	30	9	5
Olympic Games
Gold medal – first place	2004 Athens	
Silver medal – second place	2008 Beijing	
Silver medal – second place	2012 London	
World Championship
Gold medal – first place	2002 Argentina	
Gold medal – first place	2006 Japan	
Gold medal – first place	2010 Italy	
World Cup
Gold medal – first place	2003 Japan	
Gold medal – first place	2007 Japan	
Bronze medal – third place	2011 Japan	
World Grand Champions Cup
Gold medal – first place	1997 Japan	
Gold medal – first place	2005 Japan	
Gold medal – first place	2009 Japan	
World League
Gold medal – first place	2001 Katowice	
Gold medal – first place	2003 Madrid	
Gold medal – first place	2004 Rome	
Gold medal – first place	2005 Belgrade	
Gold medal – first place	2006 Moscow	
Gold medal – first place	2007 Katowice	
Gold medal – first place	2009 Belgrade	
Gold medal – first place	2010 Córdoba	
Silver medal – second place	2002 Belo Horizonte	
Silver medal – second place	2011 Gdańsk	
Bronze medal – third place	1999 Mar del Plata	
Pan American Games
Gold medal – first place	2007 Rio de Janeiro	
Silver medal – second place	1999 Winnipeg	
Bronze medal – third place	2003 Santo Domingo	
South American Championship
Gold medal – first place	1995 Brazil	
Gold medal – first place	1997 Venezuela	
Gold medal – first place	1999 Argentina	
Gold medal – first place	2001 Colombia	
Gold medal – first place	2003 Brazil	
Gold medal – first place	2005 Brazil	
Gold medal – first place	2007 Chile	
Gold medal – first place	2009 Colombia	
- Last updated: 24 August 2016

Gilberto Amauri de Godoy Filho (Brazilian Portuguese: [ʒiwˈbɛʁtu amawˈɾi dʒi ɡoˈdɔj ˈfiʎu]; born 23 December 1976), known as Giba (pronounced [ˈʒibɐ]), is a Brazilian former professional volleyball player who played as an outside hitter. For much of the 2000s, he was widely regarded as one of the best volleyball players in the world. During his professional career he played in Brazil, Italy, Russia, Argentina and briefly in the United Arab Emirates. He is mostly remembered for his successes with the national team.

With the Brazilian National Team he won a total of 8 South American Championships, 3 America's Cups, 8 World League titles, 3 World Grand Champions Cups, three World Championships (2002, 2006, 2010), a gold medal at the 2004 Summer Olympics and two silver medals at the 2008 and 2012 Summer Olympics, where he was the team's captain.

During summer 2014, Giba retired from professional volleyball at the age of 37. He was inducted into the International Volleyball Hall of Fame in 2018.

== Club career ==
Giba debuted in his country for clubs such as Curitibano, Cocamar, Chapecó, São Caetano, Nipomed, Olympikus and Minas. He later moved to Italy, acquired by Yahoo! Ferrara, playing the Italian Top Division (Serie A1). After two years with that team, he signed a contract with Noicom BreBanca Cuneo (2003). In 2006 he won the Italian Cup, and was named the Most Valuable Player of the competition. In the summer 2007 he left Italy to play with Iskra Odintsovo. After playing 2 years in Russia in 2009 Giba moved back to Brazil and played for Pinheiros where in the first season with the club he won a bronze medal of the Brazilian Superliga. Over the last years of his career he also played for Club Ciudad de Bolívar in Argentina and briefly for Al-Nasr Dubai in the United Arab Emirates it is last club.

== International career ==
=== 1995–2001 ===
Giba debuted for the Brazilian National Team at the age of 18 in 1995 and in that year already he won his first major title which was the South American Championship. As the result Brazil qualified to the World Grand Champions Cup in 1997 as the continental champion and eventually won the tournament. In the subsequent years Brazil came up short in both the 1998 World Championship in Japan, where they lost a 5-set semifinal against the two-time defending champions Italy and in 2000 Sydney Olympics where after winning their group without losing a match, Brazilian team was upset in the quarterfinals losing 1:3 to Argentina. In 2001 Giba won his first World League title, while Brazil beat 8-time winners Italy in the final.

=== 2002–2007 ===
The following years are described as the Golden Era of Brazilian volleyball where Giba was a leader of a team, coached by Bernardo Rezende, which featured such players as Dante, André, Gustavo, André Heller, Ricardo Garcia and Sérgio Santos. After losing the 2002 World League final to Russia in Belo Horizonte, the team won all of the next 11 major international competitions, including: 5 World League titles, 2 World Championships, 2 World Cups, the World Grand Champions Cup and the Olympic gold medal.

At the 2002 World Championship in Argentina, Brazil took revenge on both Italy (beating 3-time defending champions 3–2 in the quarterfinals) and Russia (winning in a dramatic five-set final). It was the first World Championships title for the Brazilian National Team in history. In 2003 led by Giba the Brazilian team won the first of five consecutive World League titles, beating Serbia and Montenegro in the final (31–29 in the fifth-set tie-break).

At the 2004 Summer Olympic Games in Athens, Giba was at his best helping Brazilian National Team to win its second gold medal in history and being voted the tournament's Most Valuable Player. On 29 August 2004, in front of 10,000 fans at the Peace and Friendship Stadium in Piraeus, the Brazilians overcame Italy 3:1 in the gold medal match. His tremendous form continued during the next couple of seasons when in addition to winning titles, Giba was also awarded the MVP trophies for his performance at the 2006 World League, the 2006 World Championship and the 2007 World Cup. In that period he was considered by many to be the best volleyball player in the world. In 2006 he was given Prêmio Brasil Olímpico as the best Brazilian athlete of the year.

=== 2008–2012 ===
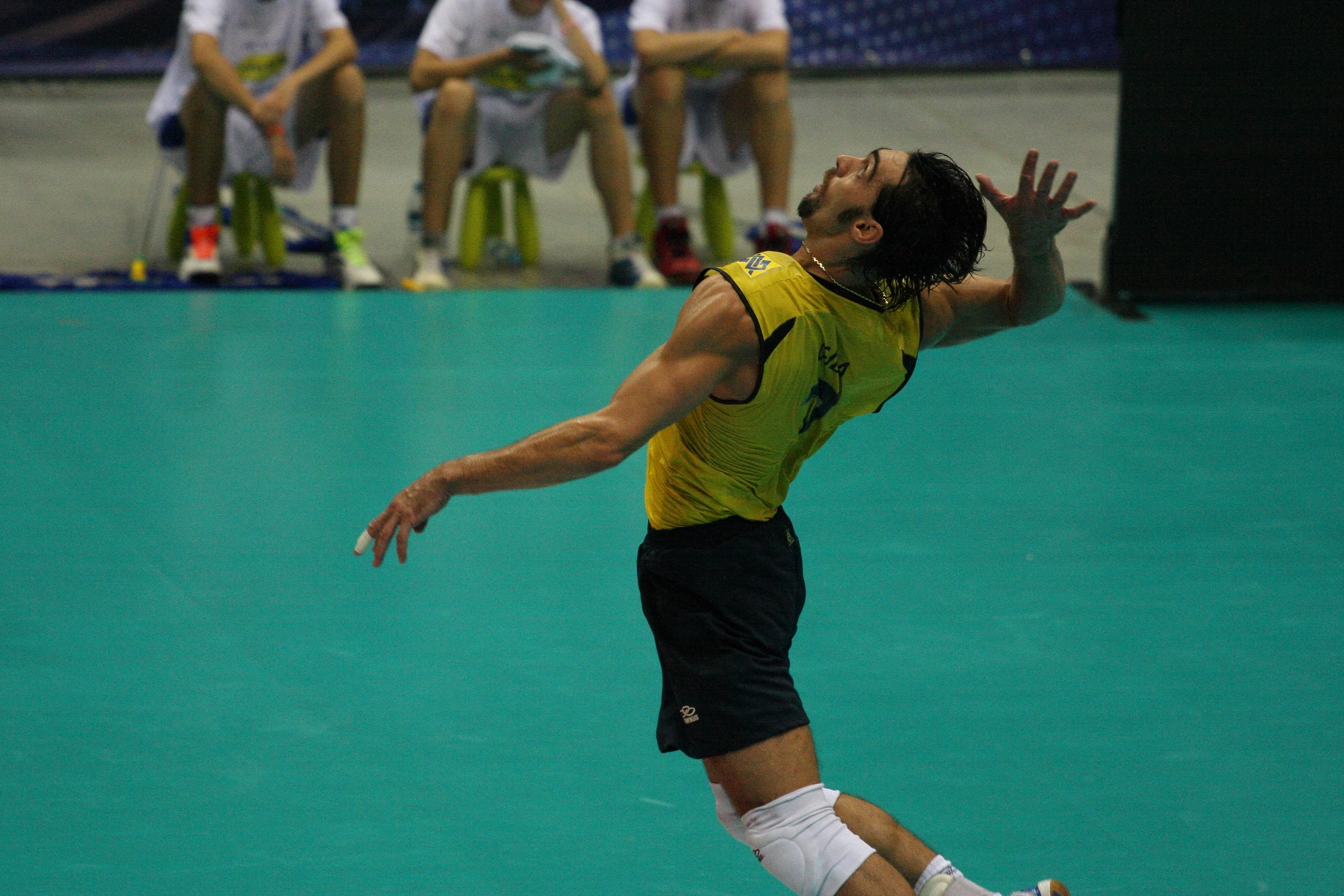
Giba in semi-final of the World League 2011

In 2008 with 32 year old Giba still in the starting lineup Brazil began to lose its aura of invincibility. The first upset came in the final tournament of the World League held in Rio de Janeiro. Playing in front of the home crowd Brazil was expected to win sixth title in row. In the semifinal however they were shocked by the United States losing the match 0:3. Later on that year Brazilian Team was able to reach the final of the Beijing Olympics, but failed to defend their gold medal as they again they lost to the US, this time in four sets.

The following year Giba was included in a rebuilt squad which bounced back from the disappointing losses and regained the World League title. In the final played in Belgrade, Brazil faced Serbia and more than 22,000 of its supporters and won in a close five-setter. In 2010 Giba lost his spot in the starting lineup, as Rezende preferred to use younger Dante and Murilo as starting spikers. Giba however remained the team's captain and was still an important part of the national team, winning his eight World League title and the third World Championship in the tournament held in Italy.

In 2011, with Dante injured, Giba returned to the starting lineup and was close to add another World League title to his collection. He came up short however, as the Brazilian Team lost a close five-set final to Russia. At the 2012 London Olympics, with Giba again used mostly as a reserve captain, Brazil reached the gold medal match again. Leading 2:0 and having a commanding advantage in the third set in the final against Russia, Giba was brought on court for his international farewell. However Brazil failed to convert on a couple of match points in the third set and were eventually beaten in five sets, so Giba and his teammates settled for the silver medal again. After the Olympics, he retired from the Brazilian national team.

== Style of play ==
Giba is not very tall for a volleyball player but he made up his height limitation with his physical skills and jumping abilities. In his playing days he was considered a good wing spiker. Giba was appreciated for his play but he also had desire, appeal and drive which fans appreciated. He was named a captain of the national team because of his leadership skills. He was recognized for his personality which helped to motivate the Brazilian team to play its best. In the 2000s Giba was a big part of Brazil's success.

== Personal life ==
Giba was born in Londrina, but raised in Curitiba. He works with children fighting leukemia. He was diagnosed with this disease when he was six months old.

In 2003–2012 he was married to the Romanian-Brazilian former international volleyball player, Cristina Pîrv. They have 2 children together, a daughter Nicoll (born 2004) and a son Patrick (born 2009). In November 2012, Cristina filed for divorce. In 2013 he started dating with Maria Luiza Dautt. Giba is fluent in three languages; Portuguese, English and Italian.

=== Commercial ===
Giba has been involved in commercial campaigns of such brands as Vogue Italia, Nissan, Technos and Olympikus.

=== Social ===
Giba has been supporting orphans and children suffering from cancer. He is active in the campaign against prostate cancer. Giba and his ex-wife Cristina Pirv, who was also a volleyball player, entered the campaign of the Institute Art of Living Well, against breast cancer. Giba has also celebrated Olympic day with 600 children from social projects in Rio de Janeiro. He is a president of the FIVB Athletes’ Commission. He is also active in social responsibility projects.

=== Media ===
The Brazilian Olympic Committee produced a documentary under the title of Heróis Olímpicos for Giba. His autobiographic book titled Giba Neles! has been translated into two languages Polish and Italian.

== Management ==
Giba in 2016 selected as President of the FIVB Athletes Commission. The commission is made up of 10 athletes from nine different countries representing both volleyball and beach volleyball and will be officially launched at the Volleyball House in Rio during the 2016 Olympic Games in the presence of the IOC and the IOC Athletes' Commission.

== Sporting achievements ==
=== Clubs ===
==== CEV Champions League ====
- 2008/2009 – with Iskra Odintsovo

==== National Championships ====
- 1999/2000 Brazilian Championship, with Minas Tênis Clube
- 2000/2001 Brazilian Championship, with Minas Tênis Clube
- 2005/2006 Italian Cup, with Bre Banca Lannutti Cuneo
- 2007/2008 Russian Championship, with Iskra Odintsovo
- 2008/2009 Russian Championship, with Iskra Odintsovo
- 2009/2010 Brazilian Championship, with Pinheiros

=== National team ===
- 1993 FIVB U19 World Championship
- 1995 FIVB U21 World Championship
- 1995 South American Championship
- 1997 South American Championship
- 1997 FIVB World Grand Champions Cup
- 1998 America's Cup
- 1999 South American Championship
- 1999 America's Cup
- 2001 FIVB World League
- 2001 South American Championship
- 2001 America's Cup
- 2002 FIVB World League
- 2002 FIVB World Championship
- 2003 FIVB World League
- 2003 South American Championship
- 2003 FIVB World Cup
- 2004 FIVB World League
- 2004 Olympic Games
- 2005 FIVB World League
- 2005 South American Championship
- 2005 FIVB World Grand Champions Cup
- 2006 FIVB World League
- 2006 FIVB World Championship
- 2007 FIVB World League
- 2007 Pan American Games
- 2007 South American Championship
- 2007 FIVB World Cup
- 2008 Olympic Games
- 2009 FIVB World League
- 2009 South American Championship
- 2009 FIVB World Grand Champions Cup
- 2010 FIVB World League
- 2010 FIVB World Championship
- 2011 FIVB World League
- 2011 FIVB World Cup
- 2012 Olympic Games

=== Individually ===
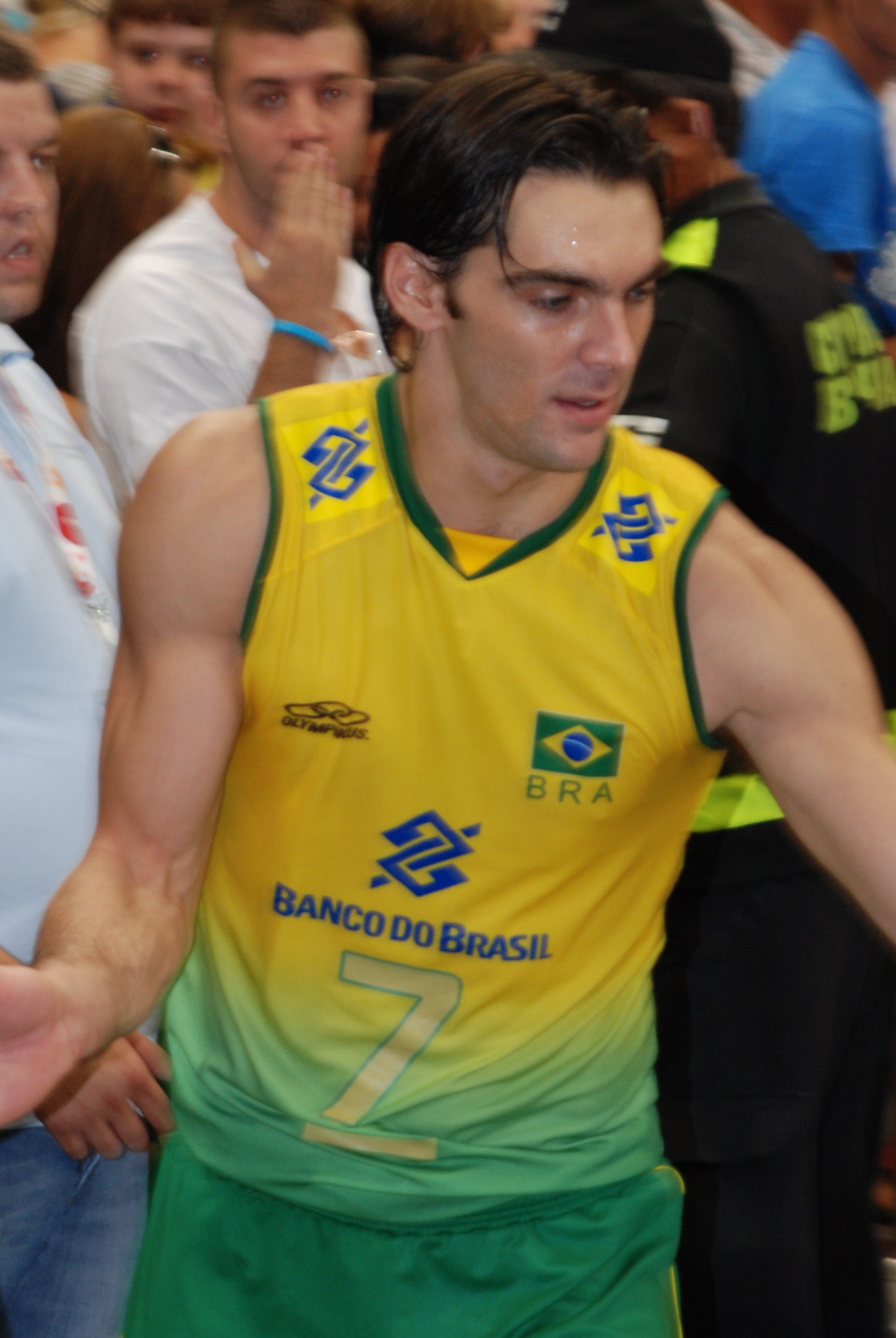
Giba in 2009

- 1993 FIVB U19 World Championship – Most Valuable Player
- 1995 FIVB U21 World Championship – Most Valuable Player
- 2004 Olympic Games – Most Valuable Player
- 2006 FIVB World League – Most Valuable Player
- 2006 FIVB World Championship – Most Valuable Player
- 2006 Prêmio Brasil Olímpico – Best athlete of the Year
- 2007 Pan American Games – Most Valuable Player
- 2007 South American Championship – Most Valuable Player
- 2007 FIVB World Cup – Most Valuable Player
- 2008 FIVB World League – Best Server
- 2009 South American Championship – Best Spiker
- 2010 Famous Magazine – Best Volleyball Player of the last Decade
- 2011 State of Parana – Medal for promotion of Sports
- 2011 Sky Sports – The most famous Volleyball player in the World
- 2015 Fox Sports – Best men's Volleyball player of all Time
- 2016 RCI Brasil – Best Sports Active
- 2018 Inducted into the International Volleyball Hall of Fame

Awards
Preceded by (Netherlands) Bas van de Goor	Most Valuable Player of Olympic Games; Athens 2004	Succeeded by (United States) Clayton Stanley
Preceded by (Serbia and Montenegro) Ivan Miljković	Most Valuable Player of FIVB World League; 2006	Succeeded by (Brazil) Ricardo Garcia
Preceded by (Argentina) Marcos Milinkovic	Most Valuable Player of FIVB World Championship; 2006	Succeeded by (Brazil) Murilo Endres
Preceded by ?	Most Valuable Player of South American Championship; 2007	Succeeded by (Brazil) Murilo Endres
Preceded by (Japan) Takahiro Yamamoto	Most Valuable Player of FIVB World Cup; 2007	Succeeded by (Russia) Maxim Mikhaylov
Preceded by (Venezuela) Ernardo Gómez	Most Valuable Player of Pan American Games; 2007	Succeeded by (Cuba) Wilfredo Leon
Preceded by (Russia) Semyon Poltavskiy	Best Server of FIVB World League; 2008	Succeeded by (Cuba) Wilfredo Leon
Preceded by (Brazil) Rodrigão	Best Spiker of South American Championship; 2009	Succeeded by (Brazil) Dante Amaral
