= Jan Martínez Franchi =

Argentine volleyball player (born 1998)

Personal information
- Born: 28 January 1998 (age 28); Buenos Aires, Argentina
- Hometown: Vicente López, Argentina
- Height: 1.90 m (6 ft 3 in)
- Weight: 85 kg (187 lb)
- Spike: 330 cm (130 in)
- Block: 310 cm (122 in)

Volleyball information
- Position: Outside hitter / Libero
- Current club: Tourcoing LM

Career
| Years | Teams |
|---|---|
| 2015–2018; 2018–2019; 2019–2020; 2020–2022; 2022–2024; 2024– | Ciudad Vóley; Bolívar Vóley; SESC RJ; Greenyard Maaseik; Trefl Gdańsk; Tourcoing LM |

National team
| Argentina |
Honours
Men's volleyball
Representing Argentina
Pan American Games
| Gold medal – first place | 2019 Lima |
Pan American Cup
| Gold medal – first place | 2018 Córdoba |
| Silver medal – second place | 2016 Mexico City |
CSV South American Championship
| Gold medal – first place | 2023 Recife |
| Silver medal – second place | 2019 Chile |

Jan Martínez Franchi (Italian: [ˈfraŋki]; born 28 January 1998) is an Argentine professional volleyball player who plays as an outside hitter for Tourcoing LM and the Argentina national team.

== Honours ==
=== Club ===
- Domestic
  - 2017–18 Argentine Cup, with Ciudad Vóley
  - 2018–19 Argentine Championship, with Bolívar Vóley
  - 2020–21 Belgian Championship, with Greenyard Maaseik
  - 2024–25 French Cup, with Tourcoing LM

=== Youth national team ===
- 2015 FIVB U19 World Championship
- 2016 CSV U21 South American Championship
- 2016 U23 Pan American Cup
- 2017 FIVB U23 World Championship

=== Individual awards ===
- 2015: FIVB U19 World Championship – Best outside spiker
- 2016: CSV U21 South American Championship – Most valuable player
