= Volleyball at the 2019 Pan American Games – Men's tournament =

Volleyball – Men's tournament at the 2019 Pan American Games
- Venue: Callao Sports Center
- Dates: 31 July – 4 August 2019
- Competitors: 96 from 8 nations

The men's tournament of volleyball at the 2019 Pan American Games in Lima, Peru took place from 31 July to 4 August 2019. All games were held at the Callao Sports Center. The defending champions were Argentina.

== Qualification ==
A total of eight men's teams qualified to compete at the games. Peru automatically qualified as hosts and five other teams qualified based on their final rank (top five) at the 2018 Men's Pan-American Volleyball Cup regardless of their continental confederation, NORCECA or CSV. The last two berths (one for NORCECA and one for CSV) should have been awarded in qualification tournaments by each confederation or assigned directly, however, qualification tournaments were not held and each confederation assigned its berth directly.

=== Qualified teams ===
Means of qualification	Teams qualified	Appearance	Previous best performance
Automatically qualified as hosts	Peru	1st	Debut
2018 Men's Pan-American Volleyball Cup (28 August–2 September 2018)	Argentina	12th	Gold medal (1995, 2015)
2018 Men's Pan-American Volleyball Cup (28 August–2 September 2018)	Brazil	17th	Gold medal (1963, 1983, 2007, 2011)
2018 Men's Pan-American Volleyball Cup (28 August–2 September 2018)	Cuba	16th	Gold medal (1971, 1975, 1979, 1991, 1999)
2018 Men's Pan-American Volleyball Cup (28 August–2 September 2018)	Puerto Rico	12th	Fourth Place (2015)
2018 Men's Pan-American Volleyball Cup (28 August–2 September 2018)	Mexico	11th	Silver medal (1955)
Last berth defined by NORCECA	United States	17th	Gold medal (1955, 1959, 1967, 1987)
Last berth defined by CSV	Chile	3rd	Fourth place (1963)

== Results ==
=== Preliminary round ===
==== Group A ====
Pos	Team	Pld	W	L	Pts	SW	SL	SR	SPW	SPL	SPR	Qualification
1	Argentina	3	3	0	15	9	0	MAX	231	183	1.262	Semifinals
2	Cuba	3	2	1	9	6	4	1.500	245	214	1.145	Semifinals
3	Puerto Rico	3	1	2	5	4	7	0.571	228	245	0.931	5th–6th place match
4	Peru (H)	3	0	3	1	1	9	0.111	187	249	0.751	7th–8th place match

Source: Lima 2019
(H) Host

31 July 2019; 12:30	Peru	1–3	Puerto Rico	Callao Sports Center; Referees: José Alejandro Muñoz (CHI), Ricardo Borroto Iglesias (CUB)
31 July 2019; 12:30	(14–25, 20–25, 25–21, 11–25); P2 P3			Callao Sports Center; Referees: José Alejandro Muñoz (CHI), Ricardo Borroto Iglesias (CUB)

31 July 2019; 14:30	Cuba	0–3	Argentina	Callao Sports Center; Referees: Walter Vera (PER), Paulo Luis Beal (BRA)
31 July 2019; 14:30	(26–28, 22–25, 22–25); P2 P3			Callao Sports Center; Referees: Walter Vera (PER), Paulo Luis Beal (BRA)

1 August 2019; 12:30	Peru	0–3	Argentina	Callao Sports Center; Referees: Randy Sánchez (MEX), David Reyes (PUR)
1 August 2019; 12:30	(16–25, 25–27, 24–26); P2 P3			Callao Sports Center; Referees: Randy Sánchez (MEX), David Reyes (PUR)

1 August 2019; 14:30	Cuba	3–1	Puerto Rico	Callao Sports Center; Referees: Luis Paulo Beal (BRA), Brian Hemelgarn (USA)
1 August 2019; 14:30	(25–18, 25–19, 25–27, 25–20); P2 P3			Callao Sports Center; Referees: Luis Paulo Beal (BRA), Brian Hemelgarn (USA)

2 August 2019; 12:30	Argentina	3–0	Puerto Rico	Callao Sports Center; Referees: Alejandro Muñoz )CHI), Paulo Luis Beal (BRA)
2 August 2019; 12:30	(25–18, 25–12, 25–18); P2 P3			Callao Sports Center; Referees: Alejandro Muñoz )CHI), Paulo Luis Beal (BRA)

2 August 2019; 14:30	Peru	0–3	Cuba	Callao Sports Center; Referees: David Reyes (PUR), Brian Hemelgarn (USA)
2 August 2019; 14:30	(15–25, 18–25, 19–25); P2 P3			Callao Sports Center; Referees: David Reyes (PUR), Brian Hemelgarn (USA)

==== Group B ====
Pos	Team	Pld	W	L	Pts	SW	SL	SR	SPW	SPL	SPR	Qualification
1	Brazil	3	3	0	11	9	4	2.250	303	260	1.165	Semifinals
2	Chile	3	2	1	9	7	5	1.400	263	266	0.989	Semifinals
3	United States	3	1	2	8	6	6	1.000	252	270	0.933	5th–6th place match
4	Mexico	3	0	3	2	2	9	0.222	246	268	0.918	7th–8th place match

Source: Lima 2019

31 July 2019; 18:30	United States	1–3	Chile	Callao Sports Center; Referees: David Reyes (PUR), Nicolás Casado (ARG)
31 July 2019; 18:30	(17–25, 17–25, 25–17, 22–25); P2 P3			Callao Sports Center; Referees: David Reyes (PUR), Nicolás Casado (ARG)

31 July 2019; 20:30	Brazil	3–1	Mexico	Callao Sports Center; Referees: Brian Hemelgarn (USA), Josmer Perez (DOM)
31 July 2019; 20:30	(25–23, 25–19, 22–25, 25–22); P2 P3			Callao Sports Center; Referees: Brian Hemelgarn (USA), Josmer Perez (DOM)

1 August 2019; 18:30	United States	3–0	Mexico	Callao Sports Center; Referees: Nicolás Casado (ARG), Josmer Perez (DOM)
1 August 2019; 18:30	(26–24, 25–22, 25–23); P2 P3			Callao Sports Center; Referees: Nicolás Casado (ARG), Josmer Perez (DOM)

1 August 2019; 20:30	Brazil	3–1	Chile	Callao Sports Center; Referees: Ricardo Borroto (CUB), Walter Vera (PER)
1 August 2019; 20:30	(25–18, 22–25, 25–16, 25–17); P2 P3			Callao Sports Center; Referees: Ricardo Borroto (CUB), Walter Vera (PER)

2 August 2019; 18:30	Mexico	1–3	Chile	Callao Sports Center; Referees: Walter Vera (PER), Nicolas Casado (ARG)
2 August 2019; 18:30	(25–20, 21–25, 22–25, 20–25); P2 P3			Callao Sports Center; Referees: Walter Vera (PER), Nicolas Casado (ARG)

2 August 2019; 20:30	United States	2–3	Brazil	Callao Sports Center; Referees: Josmer Perez (DOM), Randy Sánchez (MEX)
2 August 2019; 20:30	(25–23, 25–21, 17–25, 19–25, 9–15); P2 P3			Callao Sports Center; Referees: Josmer Perez (DOM), Randy Sánchez (MEX)

=== Placement 5th–8th ===
7th place
3 August
Peru	1
Mexico	3

5th place
3 August
Puerto Rico	3
United States	2

==== 7th–8th place match ====
3 August 2019; 12:30	Peru	1–3	Mexico	Callao Sports Center; Referees: Ricardo Borroto (PUR), Nicolás Casado (ARG)
3 August 2019; 12:30	(25–27, 24–26, 27–25, 13–25); P2 P3			Callao Sports Center; Referees: Ricardo Borroto (PUR), Nicolás Casado (ARG)

==== 5th–6th place match ====
3 August 2019; 14:30	Puerto Rico	3–2	United States	Callao Sports Center; Referees: Randy Sánchez (MEX), Alejandro Muñoz (CHI)
3 August 2019; 14:30	(22–25, 25–21, 25–22, 20–25, 15–8); P2 P3			Callao Sports Center; Referees: Randy Sánchez (MEX), Alejandro Muñoz (CHI)

=== Placement 1st–4th ===
Semifinals
Brazil	0
Cuba	3
Argentina	3
Chile	1

Gold medal match
Cuba	0
Argentina	3
Bronze medal match
Brazil	3
Chile	0

==== Semifinals ====
3 August 2019; 18:30	Brazil	0–3	Cuba	Callao Sports Center; Referees: Walter Vera (PER), Brian Hemelgarn (USA)
3 August 2019; 18:30	(16–25, 22–25, 21–25); P2 P3			Callao Sports Center; Referees: Walter Vera (PER), Brian Hemelgarn (USA)

3 August 2019; 20:30	Argentina	3–1	Chile	Callao Sports Center; Referees: David Reyes (PUR), Josmer Perez (DOM)
3 August 2019; 20:30	(25–21, 23–25, 28–26, 25–17); P2 P3			Callao Sports Center; Referees: David Reyes (PUR), Josmer Perez (DOM)

==== Bronze medal match ====
4 August 2019; 18:00	Brazil	3–0	Chile	Callao Sports Center; Referees: Josmer Perez (DOM), Nicolás Casado (ARG)
4 August 2019; 18:00	(25–12, 25–19, 25–21); P2 P3			Callao Sports Center; Referees: Josmer Perez (DOM), Nicolás Casado (ARG)

==== Gold medal match ====
4 August 2018; 21:00	Cuba	0–3	Argentina	Callao Sports Center; Referees: Walter Vera (PER), Paulo Luis Beal (BRA)
4 August 2018; 21:00	(20–25, 17–25, 20–25); P2 P3			Callao Sports Center; Referees: Walter Vera (PER), Paulo Luis Beal (BRA)

== Final standings ==
Rank	Team
1st place, gold medalist(s)	Argentina
2nd place, silver medalist(s)	Cuba
3rd place, bronze medalist(s)	Brazil
4	Chile
5	Puerto Rico
6	United States
7	Mexico
8	Peru

== Awards ==
- Most valuable player
  - Nicolás Bruno (ARG)
- Best setter
  - Matías Sánchez (ARG)
- Best outside hitters
  - Vicente Parraguirre (CHI)
  - Carlos Eduardo Silva (BRA)
- Best middle blockers
  - Roamy Alonso (CUB)
  - Liván Osoria (CUB)
- Best opposite
  - Maurice Torres (PUR)
- Best libero
  - Sebastian Castillo (CHI)

== Medalists ==
Event	Gold	Silver	Bronze
Men's tournament	Argentina; Manuel Balague; Nicolás Bruno; Gastón Fernández; Joaquín Gallego; Matías Giraudo; Facundo Imhoff; German Johansen; Jan Martínez; Franco Massimino; Luciano Palonsky; Matías Sánchez; Lisandro Zanotti	Cuba; Roamy Alonso; Javier Concepción; Yonder García; Adrián Goide; Jesús Herrera; Yohan León; Miguel López; José Massó; Osniel Mergarejo; Liván Osoria; Lyvan Taboada; Marlon Yant	Brazil; Aboubacar Neto; Carlos Silva; Cledenílson Batista; Éder Carbonera; Eduardo Sobrinho; Felipe Roque; Henrique Honorato; Lucas Lóh; Matheus Santos; Rodrigo Leão; Rogério Filho; Thiago Veloso
