= 2016 Men's Pan-American Volleyball Cup =

Tournament details
- Host country: Mexico
- Dates: 21–26 May
- Teams: 10
- Venue: 1 (in 1 host city)

Final positions
- Champions: Cuba (2nd title)

Tournament awards
- MVP: (Cuba) Abrahan Alfonso Gavilán

The 2016 Men's Pan-American Volleyball Cup was the eleventh edition of the annual men's volleyball tournament. It was held in Mexico City, Mexico from 21 to 26 May 2016 and played by ten countries.

== Pools composition ==
Pool A	Pool B	Pool C
Chile	Canada	Argentina
Dominican Republic	Costa Rica	Colombia
United States	Cuba	Honduras
		Mexico

== Venue ==
- Gimnasio Olímpico Juan de la Barrera, Mexico City

== Pool standing procedure ==
1. Number of matches won
2. Match points
3. Points ratio
4. Sets ratio
5. Result of the last match between the tied teams

Match won 3–0: 5 match points for the winner, 0 match points for the loser
Match won 3–1: 4 match points for the winner, 1 match point for the loser
Match won 3–2: 3 match points for the winner, 2 match points for the loser

== Preliminary round ==
- All times are Central Daylight Time (UTC−06:00).

=== Pool A ===
Pos	Team	Pld	W	L	Pts	SPW	SPL	SPR	SW	SL	SR	Qualification
1	United States	2	2	0	8	193	167	1.156	6	2	3.000	Quarterfinals
2	Dominican Republic	2	1	1	5	182	193	0.943	4	4	1.000	Quarterfinals
3	Chile	2	0	2	2	171	186	0.919	2	6	0.333	7th–10th classifications

Date	Time		Score		Set 1	Set 2	Set 3	Set 4	Set 5	Total	Report
21 May	14:00	United States	3–1	Chile	25–17	17–25	25–15	25–22		92–79	P2 P3
22 May	14:00	Chile	1–3	Dominican Republic	20–25	25–18	24–26	23–25		92–94	P2 P3
23 May	16:00	Dominican Republic	1–3	United States	20–25	23–25	28–26	17–25		88–101	P2 P3

=== Pool B ===
Pos	Team	Pld	W	L	Pts	SPW	SPL	SPR	SW	SL	SR	Qualification
1	Cuba	2	2	0	8	183	146	1.253	6	2	3.000	Semifinals
2	Canada	2	1	1	7	176	147	1.197	5	3	1.667	Quarterfinals
3	Costa Rica	2	0	2	0	84	150	0.560	0	6	0.000	7th–10th classifications

Date	Time		Score		Set 1	Set 2	Set 3	Set 4	Set 5	Total	Report
21 May	18:00	Costa Rica	0–3	Canada	15–25	13–25	11–25			39–75	P2 P3
22 May	14:00	Cuba	3–0	Costa Rica	25–11	25–16	25–18			75–45	P2 P3
23 May	18:00	Canada	2–3	Cuba	25–20	17–25	21–25	25–23	13–15	101–108	P2 P3

=== Pool C ===
Pos	Team	Pld	W	L	Pts	SPW	SPL	SPR	SW	SL	SR	Qualification
1	Argentina	3	3	0	14	251	192	1.307	9	1	9.000	Semifinals
2	Mexico	3	2	1	9	284	270	1.052	7	5	1.400	Quarterfinals
3	Colombia	3	1	2	7	248	258	0.961	5	6	0.833	7th–10th classifications
4	Honduras	3	0	3	0	162	225	0.720	0	9	0.000	7th–10th classifications

Date	Time		Score		Set 1	Set 2	Set 3	Set 4	Set 5	Total	Report
21 May	16:00	Argentina	3–0	Colombia	25–16	25–20	25–22			75–58	P2 P3
21 May	20:00	Mexico	3–0	Honduras	25–17	25–15	25–22			75–54	P2 P3
22 May	16:00	Honduras	0–3	Argentina	10–25	19–25	16–25			45–75	P2 P3
22 May	20:00	Mexico	3–2	Colombia	32–30	25–20	25–27	23–25	15–13	120–115	P2 P3
23 May	14:00	Colombia	3–0	Honduras	25–22	25–20	25–21			75–63	P2 P3
23 May	20:00	Mexico	1–3	Argentina	18–25	21–25	28–26	22–25		89–101	P2 P3

== Final round ==
- All times are Central Daylight Time (UTC−06:00).

=== Championship bracket ===
Quarterfinals
A1	United States	1
B2	Canada	3
C2	Mexico	3
A2	Dominican Republic	0

Semifinals
C1	Argentina	3
B2	Canada	1
B1	Cuba	3
C2	Mexico	1
5th place
A1	United States	3
A2	Dominican Republic	0

Final
C1	Argentina	2
B1	Cuba	3
3rd place
B2	Canada	3
C2	Mexico	0

=== 7th–10th places bracket ===
Classification 7–10
C3	Colombia	3
C4	Honduras	0
A3	Chile	3
B3	Costa Rica	0

7th place
C3	Colombia	0
A3	Chile	3
9th place
C4	Honduras	2
B3	Costa Rica	3

==== Classification 7th–10th ====
Date	Time		Score		Set 1	Set 2	Set 3	Set 4	Set 5	Total	Report
24 May	14:00	Colombia	3–0	Honduras	25–23	25–21	25–21			75–65	P2 P3
24 May	16:00	Chile	3–0	Costa Rica	25–15	25–18	25–23			75–56	P2 P3

==== Quarterfinals ====
Date	Time		Score		Set 1	Set 2	Set 3	Set 4	Set 5	Total	Report
24 May	18:00	United States	1–3	Canada	24–26	28–26	19–25	29–31		100–108	P2 P3
24 May	20:00	Mexico	3–0	Dominican Republic	25–22	25–19	28–26			78–67	P2 P3

==== 9th place match ====
Date	Time		Score		Set 1	Set 2	Set 3	Set 4	Set 5	Total	Report
25 May	14:00	Honduras	2–3	Costa Rica	21–25	27–25	25–20	26–28	11–15	110–113	P2 P3

==== 7th place match ====
Date	Time		Score		Set 1	Set 2	Set 3	Set 4	Set 5	Total	Report
25 May	16:00	Colombia	0–3	Chile	19–25	19–25	22–25			60–75	P2 P3

==== Semifinals ====
Date	Time		Score		Set 1	Set 2	Set 3	Set 4	Set 5	Total	Report
25 May	18:00	Argentina	3–1	Canada	34–32	24–26	25–22	25–22		108–102	P2 P3
25 May	20:00	Cuba	3–1	Mexico	25–21	26–28	25–14	25–18		101–81	P2 P3

==== 5th place match ====
Date	Time		Score		Set 1	Set 2	Set 3	Set 4	Set 5	Total	Report
26 May	16:00	Dominican Republic	0–3	United States	22–25	15–25	14–25			51–75	P2 P3

==== 3rd place match ====
Date	Time		Score		Set 1	Set 2	Set 3	Set 4	Set 5	Total	Report
26 May	18:00	Mexico	0–3	Canada	20–25	20–25	27–29			67–79	P2 P3

==== Final ====
Date	Time		Score		Set 1	Set 2	Set 3	Set 4	Set 5	Total	Report
26 May	20:00	Cuba	3–2	Argentina	30–32	20–25	25–23	25–18	19–17	119–115	P2 P3

== Final standing ==
Rank	Team
1st place, gold medalist(s)	Cuba
2nd place, silver medalist(s)	Argentina
3rd place, bronze medalist(s)	Canada
4	Mexico
5	United States
6	Dominican Republic
7	Chile
8	Colombia
9	Costa Rica
10	Honduras

2016 Men's Pan-American Cup
champions

Cuba
Second title

12–man roster
Calvo, Rendón, García, Osoria, Ferrer, Alfonso Gavilán, Rivera, Albo, Sosa, Concepción, Goide, Melgarejo
Head coach
Sánchez

== Individual awards ==
- Most valuable player
  (Cuba) Abrahan Alfonso Gavilán
- Best setter
  (Argentina) Matías Sánchez
- Best Outside Hitters
  (Mexico) Jorge Barajas
  (Chile) Vicente Parraguirre
- Best Middle Blockers
  (Argentina) Fabián Flores
  (Cuba) Luis Sosa
- Best Opposite
  (Dominican Republic) Henry Tapia
- Best scorer
  (Mexico) Jorge Barajas
- Best server
  (United States) Gregory Petty
- Best libero
  (Argentina) Santiago Danani
- Best digger
  (Argentina) Santiago Danani
- Best receiver
  (Argentina) Santiago Danani
