= Ezequiel Palacios =

Argentine volleyball player (born 1992)

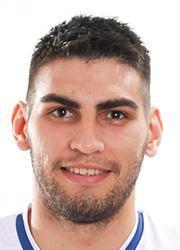
- Palacios in 2019

Personal information
- Full name: Ezequiel Alberto Palacios
- Nickname: Pala
- Born: 2 October 1992 (age 34); San Martín, Argentina
- Height: 1.98 m (6 ft 6 in)
- Weight: 90 kg (198 lb)
- Spike: 352 cm (139 in)
- Block: 330 cm (130 in)

Volleyball information
- Position: Outside hitter
- Current club: Montpellier Volley
- Number: 13

Career
| Years | Teams |
|---|---|
| 2009–2016; 2016–2017; 2017–2018; 2018–2020; 2020– | La Unión de Formosa; AZS Olsztyn; Ciudad Vóley; Top Volley Latina; Montpellier Volley |

National team
| Argentina |
Honours
Men's volleyball
Representing Argentina
Olympic Games
| Bronze medal – third place | 2020 Tokyo |
Pan American Games
| Gold medal – first place | 2015 Toronto |
Pan American Cup
| Gold medal – first place | 2018 Córdoba |
| Bronze medal – third place | 2013 Mexico City |
| Bronze medal – third place | 2014 Tijuana |
CSV South American Championship
| Gold medal – first place | 2023 Recife |
| Silver medal – second place | 2013 Cabo Frio |
| Silver medal – second place | 2019 Chile |
| Silver medal – second place | 2021 Brasília |

Ezequiel Alberto Palacios (born 2 October 1992) is an Argentine professional volleyball player who plays as an outside hitter for Montpellier Volley and the Argentina national team.

== Honours ==
=== Club ===
- Domestic
  - 2017–18 Argentine Cup, with Ciudad Vóley
  - 2021–22 French Championship, with Montpellier Volley

=== Individual awards ===
- 2018: Pan American Cup – Most valuable player
- 2018: Pan American Cup – Best outside hitter
