= Santiago Danani =

Argentine volleyball player (born 1995)

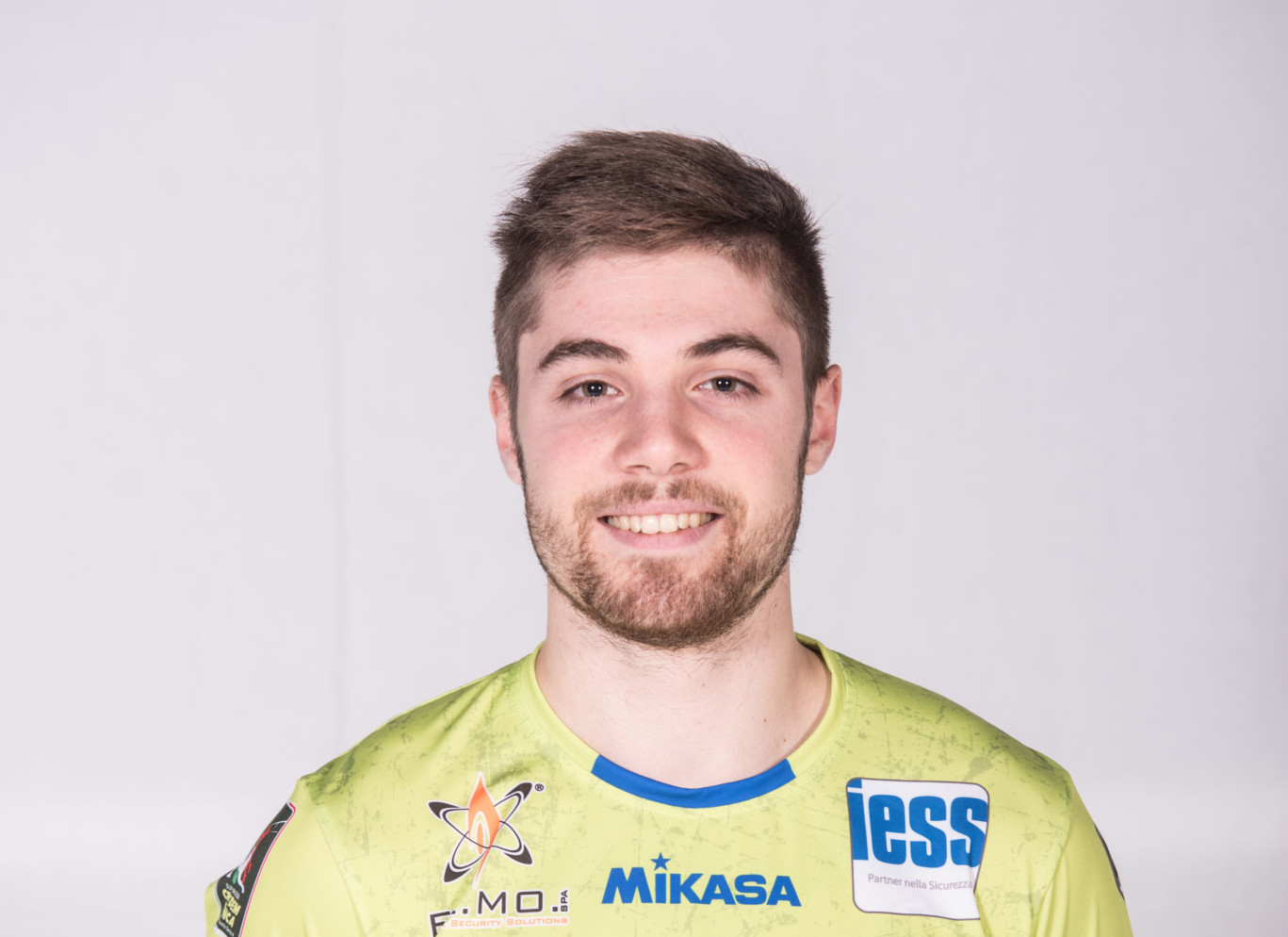
- Danani in 2019

Personal information
- Full name: Santiago Nicolás Danani La Fuente
- Born: 12 December 1995 (age 30); Buenos Aires, Argentina
- Height: 1.76 m (5 ft 9 in)
- Weight: 78 kg (172 lb)

Volleyball information
- Position: Libero
- Current club: Zenit Kazan

Career
Years	Teams
2014–2016; 2016–2017; 2017–2018; 2018–2021; 2021–2022; 2022–2023; 2023–2025; 2025–	Club de Amigos; Obras de San Juan; River Plate; Kioene Padova; Berlin Recycling Volleys; Warta Zawiercie; Fakel Novy Urengoy; Zenit Kazan

National team
2016–	Argentina
Honours
Men's volleyball
Representing Argentina
Olympic Games
Bronze medal – third place	2020 Tokyo
Pan American Cup
Gold medal – first place	2017 Gatineau
Gold medal – first place	2018 Córdoba
Silver medal – second place	2016 Mexico City
CSV South American Championship
Gold medal – first place	2023 Recife
Silver medal – second place	2019 Chile
Silver medal – second place	2021 Brasília

Santiago Nicolás Danani La Fuente (born 12 December 1995) is an Argentine professional volleyball player who plays as a libero for Zenit Kazan and the Argentina national team. Danani won a bronze medal at the Olympic Games Tokyo 2020.

== Honours ==
=== Club ===
- Domestic
  - 2021–22 German SuperCup, with Berlin Recycling Volleys
  - 2021–22 German Championship, with Berlin Recycling Volleys

=== Youth national team ===
- 2015 FIVB U21 World Championship
- 2016 U23 Pan American Cup
- 2016 CSV U23 South American Championship
- 2017 FIVB U23 World Championship

=== Individual awards ===
- 2015: FIVB U21 World Championship – Best libero
- 2016: Pan American Cup – Best digger
- 2016: Pan American Cup – Best libero
- 2016: Pan American Cup – Best receiver
- 2016: CSV U23 South American Championship – Best libero
- 2019: CSV South American Championship – Best libero
- 2021: CSV South American Championship – Best libero
