= Mario Rivera =

Mario Rivera may refer to:

- Mario Orozco Rivera (1930–1998), Mexican muralist and painter
- Mario Rivera (football manager) (born 1977), Spanish football manager
- Mario Rivera (musician) (1939–2007), Dominican Republic musician, composer and arranger
- Mario Rivera (volleyball) (born 1982), Cuban volleyball player
- Mario Rivera Martino, (1924–2017), Puerto Rican journalist
