= 2000 Volleyball America's Cup =

The 2000 Volleyball America's Cup was the third edition of the annual men's volleyball tournament, played by six countries from North-, Central- and South America. The tournament was held from August 11 to August 20, 2000, in São Bernardo, Brazil.

== Main Round ==
	Team	Points	G	W	L	PW	PL	Ratio	SW	SL	Ratio
1.	Brazil	10	5	5	0				15	1	15.000
2.	Cuba	8	5	3	2				11	7	1.571
3.	Argentina	8	5	3	2				10	8	1.250
4.	United States	7	5	2	3				10	10	1.000
5.	Canada	7	5	2	3				6	12	0.500
6.	Venezuela	5	5	0	5				1	15	0.066

- Friday 2000-08-11

United States	3 – 0	Venezuela	25-23 25-20 25-20
Brazil	3 – 0	Canada	25-16 26-24 25-22

- Saturday 2000-08-12

Argentina	3 – 0	Venezuela	25-14 25-21 30-28
Brazil	3 – 0	Cuba	25-16 26-24 25-22

- Sunday 2000-08-13

Cuba	3 – 1	United States	25-22 22-25 33-31 25-20
Argentina	3 – 0	Canada	25-19 25-18 25-19

- Monday 2000-08-14

Canada	3 – 1	Venezuela	25-21 22-25 28-26 25-23
Brazil	3 – 0	Argentina	25-21 25-17 25-20

- Tuesday 2000-08-15

Cuba	3 – 0	Canada	25-18 25-18 25-15
Brazil	3 – 1	United States	25-23 17-25 25-23 25-23

- Wednesday 2000-08-16

Cuba	3 – 0	Venezuela	25-19 25-18 25-16
United States	3 – 1	Argentina	25-18 18-25 25-17 25-14

- Thursday 2000-08-17

Canada	3 – 2	United States	25-21 17-25 18-25 25-18 16-14
Brazil	3 – 0	Venezuela	25-23 25-22 25-16
Argentina	3 – 2	Cuba	25-23 21-25 25-19 24-26 15-08

== Final round ==
Semi-finals
2000-08-19 – São Bernardo
Brazil	3
United States	1
2000-08-19 – São Bernardo
Cuba	3
Argentina	1

Final
2000-08-20 – São Bernardo
Brazil	1
Cuba	3
3rd place
2000-08-20 – São Bernardo
United States	3
Argentina	2

=== Semi-finals ===
- Saturday 2000-08-19

Brazil	3 – 1	United States	25-23 23-25 25-20 26-24
Cuba	3 – 1	Argentina	25-22 25-19 23-25 25-21

=== Finals ===
- Sunday 2000-08-20 — Bronze Medal Match

United States	3 – 2	Argentina	22-25 25-15 18-25 25-23 15-10

- Sunday 2000-08-20 — Gold Medal Match

Brazil	1 – 3	Cuba	22-25 25-21 29-31 22-25

== Final ranking ==
Place	Team
1.	Cuba
2.	Brazil
3.	United States
4.	Argentina
5.	Canada
6.	Venezuela

2000 Men's America's Cup winners

Cuba
First title

== Awards ==
- Best spiker
  - Ángel Dennis (CUB)
- Best receiver
  - Erik Sullivan (USA)
- Best blocker
  - Douglas Chiarotti (BRA)
- Best digger
  - Gilmar Teixeira (BRA)
- Best server
  - Ángel Dennis (CUB)
- Best setter
  - Lloy Ball (USA)
