= 2008 Volleyball America's Cup =

The 2008 Volleyball America's Cup was the seventh edition of the annual men's volleyball tournament, played by six countries from North, Central and South America. The tournament was held from September 24 to September 28, 2008 in Cuiabá, Brazil.

== Competing nations ==
Pool A	Pool B
Brazil; Mexico; Venezuela	Argentina; Cuba; United States

== First round ==
=== Pool A ===
Rk	Team	Points	Won	Lost	PW	PL	Ratio	SW	SL	Ratio
1	Brazil	4	2	0	150	109	1.376	6	0	MAX
2	Venezuela	3	1	1	130	132	0.985	3	3	1.000
3	Mexico	2	0	2	111	150	0.740	0	6	0.000

September 24, 2008

Mexico	0–3	Brazil	18-25, 16-25, 20-25

September 25, 2008

Brazil	3–0	Venezuela	25-20, 25-19, 25-16

September 26, 2008

Venezuela	3–0	Mexico	25-20, 25-17, 25-20

=== Pool B ===
Rk	Team	Points	Won	Lost	PW	PL	Ratio	SW	SL	Ratio
1	Cuba	4	2	0	188	155	1.213	6	2	3.000
2	Argentina	3	1	1	153	171	0.895	3	5	0.600
3	United States	2	0	2	196	211	0.929	4	6	0.667

September 24, 2008

Cuba	3–2	United States	25-19, 25-27, 23-25, 25-21, 15-8

September 25, 2008

United States	2–3	Argentina	17-25, 25-16, 16-25, 25-17, 13-15

September 26, 2008

Argentina	0–3	Cuba	21-25, 16-25, 18-25

== Final round ==
Semifinals
2008-09-27
Brazil	3
Argentina	0
2008-09-27
Venezuela	2
Cuba	3

Final
2008-09-28
Brazil	2
Cuba	3
3rd place
2008-09-28
Argentina	0
Venezuela	3

September 27, 2008

5th place	Mexico	0–3	United States	23-25, 19-25, 15-25
Semifinal	Brazil	3–0	Argentina	25-17, 25-22, 29-27
Semifinal	Venezuela	2–3	Cuba	25-21, 16-25, 25-21, 19-25, 15-17

September 28, 2008

3rd Place	Argentina	0–3	Venezuela	19-25, 16-25, 16-25
Final	Brazil	2–3	Cuba	24-26, 25-19, 25-27, 25-16, 9-15

== Final standings ==
Place	Team
1st place, gold medalist(s)	Cuba
2nd place, silver medalist(s)	Brazil
3rd place, bronze medalist(s)	Venezuela
4	Argentina
5	United States
6	Mexico

2008 America's Cup champions

Cuba
Second title

== Awards ==
- Best scorer
  - (Cuba) Roberlandy Simon
- Best spiker
  - (Cuba) Roberlandy Simon
- Best blocker
  - (Brazil) Éder Carbonera
- Best server
  - (United States) Evan Patak
- Best setter
  - (Brazil) Bruno Rezende
- Best receiver
  - (Brazil) Sérgio Dutra Santos
- Best digger
  - (Argentina) Martín Meana
- Best libero
  - (Brazil) Sérgio Dutra Santos
