= Miguel Ángel López (volleyball) =

Cuban volleyball player (born 1997)

Personal information
- Full name: Miguel Ángel López Castro
- Nickname: Miki, Africa, ML18, Black Panther, The Flying Cuban, El Corcho López
- Nationality: (Cuba) Cuban
- Born: 25 March 1997 (age 29); Cienfuegos, Cuba
- Height: 1.89 m (6 ft 2 in)
- Weight: 90 kg (198 lb)
- Spike: 363 cm (143 in)
- Block: 345 cm (136 in)

Volleyball information
- Position: Outside hitter
- Current club: Panasonic Panthers
- Number: 18

Career
Years	Teams
2015–2017; 2017–2019; 2019–2020; 2020–	Cienfuegos; Gigantes del Sur; UPCN Vóley Club; Sada Cruzeiro

National team
2016–	Cuba
Honours
Men's volleyball
Representing Cuba
FIVB Challenger Cup
Gold medal – first place	2022 Seoul
Silver medal – second place	2019 Ljubljana
Pan American Games
Silver medal – second place	2019 Lima
Pan American Cup
Gold medal – first place	2019 Colima City
Gold medal – first place	2022 Gatineau
Bronze medal – third place	2017 Gatineau
Bronze medal – third place	2018 Córdoba
NORCECA Championship
Gold medal – first place	2019 Winnipeg

Miguel Ángel López Castro (born 25 March 1997) is a Cuban volleyball player who plays as an outside hitter for SV League club Osaka Bluteon and the Cuban national team, which he captains.

He was a participant at the Olympic Games Rio 2016.

== Early life ==
Lopez Castro was born in Cienfuegos Province, Cuba, as the youngest of three children of Elcida Juana Castro and Miguel Angel Lopez Martinez. His interest in volleyball began at the age of seven, when he saw footage of former Cuban star Joel Despaigne and his jumping ability.

By the age of 18, he was selected among other young players to the national volleyball centre "Escuela National de Voleibol" in Havana, as one of the top prospects in the country.

== Sporting achievements ==
=== Clubs ===
- FIVB Club World Championship
  - Betim 2021 – with Sada Cruzeiro
  - Betim 2022 – with Sada Cruzeiro
- CSV South American Club Championship
  - Contagem 2020 – with UPCN Vóley Club
  - Contagem 2022 – with Sada Cruzeiro
- AVC Champions League
  - 2025 – with Osaka Bluteon
- National championships
  - 2019/2020 Argentine Cup, with UPCN Vóley Club
  - 2020/2021 Brazilian Cup, with Sada Cruzeiro
  - 2021/2022 Brazilian SuperCup, with Sada Cruzeiro
  - 2021/2022 Brazilian Championship, with Sada Cruzeiro

=== Youth national team ===
- 2016 U23 Pan American Cup
- 2017 U21 Pan American Cup
- 2017 FIVB U21 World Championship
- 2017 FIVB U23 World Championship
- 2018 U23 Pan American Cup

=== Individual awards ===
- 2016: U23 Pan American Cup – Best outside hitter
- 2016: U23 Pan American Cup – Best server
- 2017: U21 Pan American Cup – Best outside hitter
- 2017: Pan American Cup – Best outside hitter
- 2018: Pan American Cup – Best outside hitter
- 2018: U23 Pan American Cup – Best outside hitter
- 2019: Pan American Cup – Most valuable player
- 2019: NORCECA Championship – Most valuable player
- 2020: CSV South American Club Championship – Best outside hitter
- 2021: FIVB Club World Championship – Best outside hitter
- 2021: FIVB Club World Championship – Most valuable player
- 2022: CSV South American Club Championship – Most valuable player
- 2022: Brazilian Championship – Best outside hitter
- 2022: Brazilian Championship – Most valuable player
- 2025: AVC Champions League – Best outside hitter
