= Matías Sánchez (volleyball) =

Argentine volleyball player (born 1996)

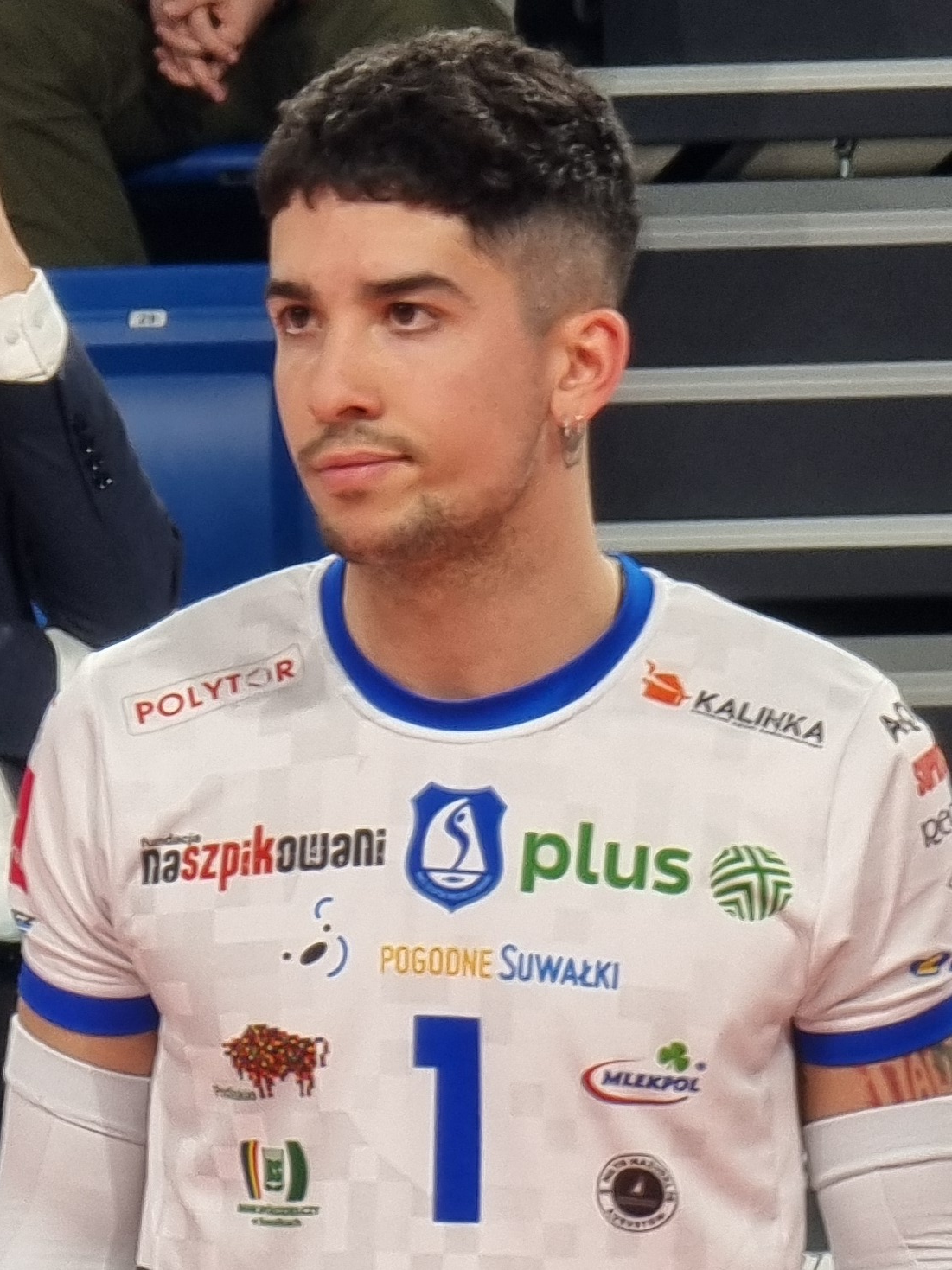
- Sánchez in 2024

Personal information
- Full name: Matías Sánchez Pages
- Born: 20 September 1996 (age 30); San Juan, Argentina
- Height: 1.73 m (5 ft 8 in)
- Weight: 64 kg (141 lb)
- Spike: 304 cm (120 in)
- Block: 282 cm (111 in)

Volleyball information
- Position: Setter
- Current club: Montpellier Volley

Career
Years	Teams
2014–2015; 2015–2019; 2019–2020; 2020–2022; 2022–2025; 2025–	Bolívar Vóley; Obras de San Juan; SESC RJ; Tourcoing LM; Ślepsk Suwałki; Montpellier Volley

National team
Argentina
Honours
Men's volleyball
Representing Argentina
Olympic Games
Bronze medal – third place	2020 Tokyo
Pan American Games
Gold medal – first place	2019 Lima
Pan American Cup
Gold medal – first place	2018 Córdoba
Silver medal – second place	2016 Mexico City
Silver medal – second place	2019 Colima City
CSV South American Championship
Gold medal – first place	2023 Recife
Silver medal – second place	2019 Chile

Matías Sánchez Pages (born 20 September 1996) is an Argentine professional volleyball player who plays as a setter for Montpellier Volley and the Argentina national team. Sánchez won a bronze medal at the Olympic Games Tokyo 2020.

== Honours ==
=== Club ===
- Domestic
  - 2014–15 Argentine Cup, with Bolívar Vóley
  - 2018–19 Argentine Cup, with Obras de San Juan

=== Youth national team ===
- 2012 CSV U19 South American Championship
- 2015 FIVB U21 World Championship
- 2016 U23 Pan American Cup
- 2017 FIVB U23 World Championship

=== Individual awards ===
- 2013: FIVB U19 World Championship – Best setter
- 2015: FIVB U21 World Championship – Best setter
- 2016: Pan American Cup – Best setter
- 2016: U23 Pan American Cup – Best setter
- 2017: FIVB U23 World Championship – Best setter
- 2018: Pan American Cup – Best setter
- 2019: Pan American Games – Best setter
- 2019: CSV South American Championship – Best setter
