= Luciano Palonsky =

Argentine volleyball player (born 1999)

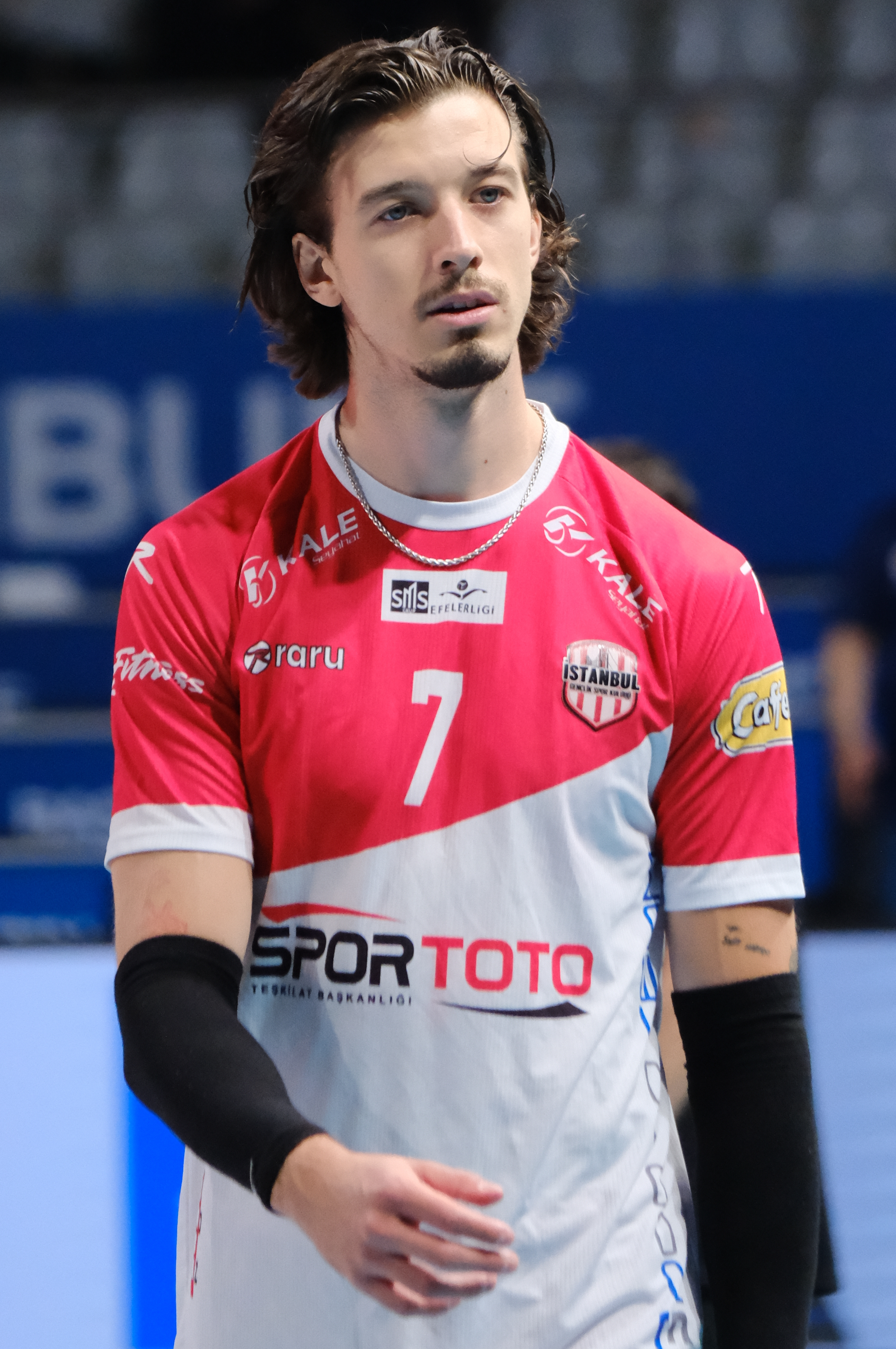
- Luciano Palonsky in 2026

Personal information
- Born: 8 July 1999 (age 27); Buenos Aires, Argentina
- Height: 1.98 m (6 ft 6 in)
- Weight: 85 kg (187 lb)
- Spike: 355 cm (140 in)
- Block: 328 cm (129 in)

Volleyball information
- Position: Outside hitter
- Current club: Osaka Blazers Sakai

Career
Years	Teams
2017–2020; 2020–2021; 2021; 2021–2023; 2023–2024; 2024; 2024–	Ciudad Vóley; Tourcoing LM; Gioiella Prisma Taranto; Tours VB; Barkom-Kazhany Lviv; Tours VB; Osaka Blazers Sakai

National team
Argentina
Honours
Men's volleyball
Representing Argentina
Pan American Games
Gold medal – first place	2019 Lima
Pan American Cup
Gold medal – first place	2018 Córdoba
Silver medal – second place	2019 Colima City
CSV South American Championship
Silver medal – second place	2019 Chile

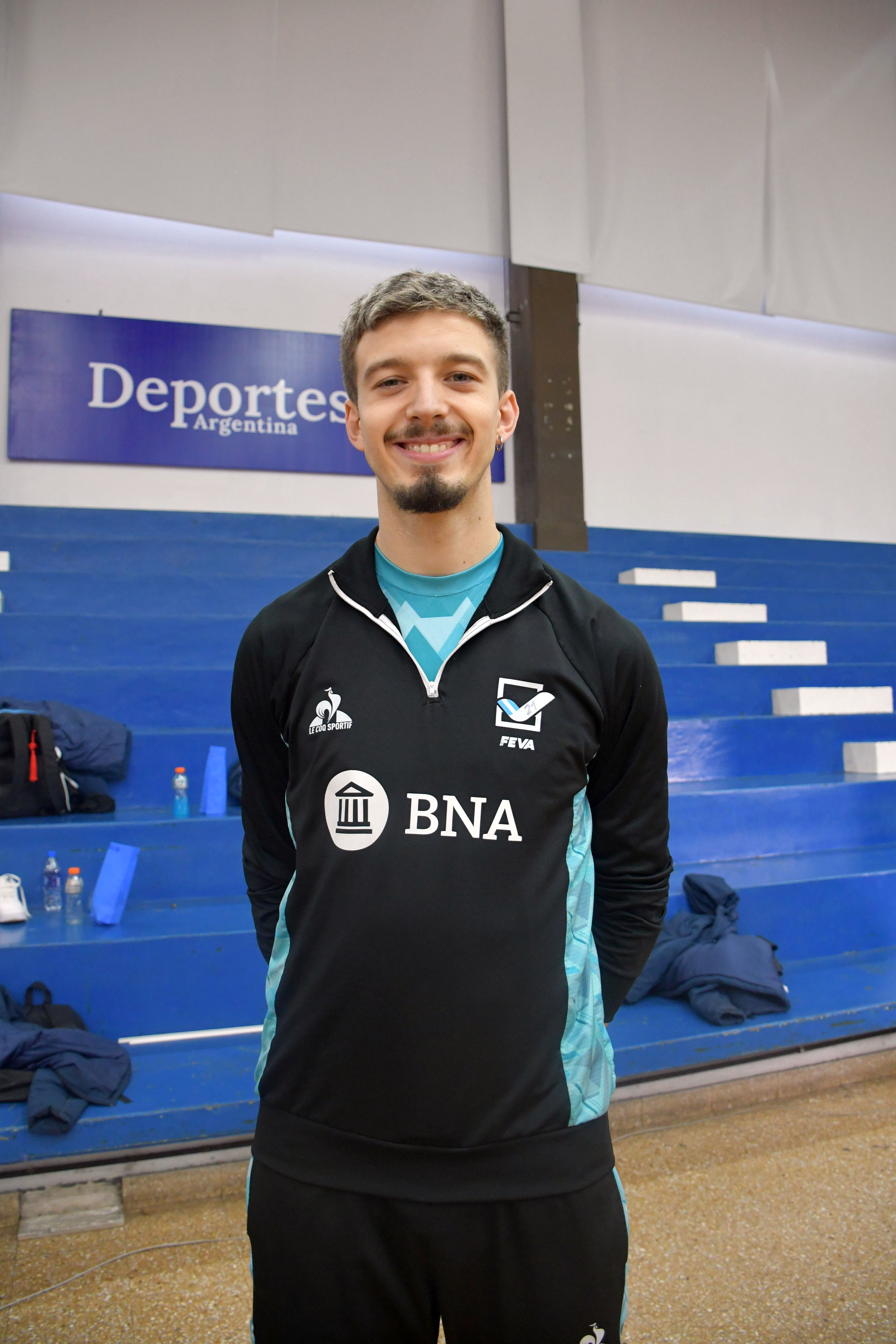

Luciano Palonsky (born 8 July 1999) is an Argentine professional volleyball player who plays as an outside hitter for Osaka Blazers Sakai and the Argentina national team.

== Honours ==
=== Club ===
- CEV Cup
  - 2021–22 – with Tours VB
- Domestic
  - 2017–18 Argentine Cup, with Ciudad Vóley
  - 2022–23 French Cup, with Tours VB
  - 2022–23 French Championship, with Tours VB

=== Youth national team ===
- 2016 CSV U19 South American Championship

=== Individual awards ===
- 2016: CSV U19 South American Championship – Best outside spiker
