= 1998 Volleyball America's Cup =

The 1998 Volleyball America's Cup was the first edition of the annual men's volleyball tournament, played by six countries from North-, Central- and South America. The tournament was held from October 1 to October 11, 1998, in Catamarca, Tucumán, Salta, and Mar del Plata, Argentina.

== Main Round ==
	Team	Points	G	W	L	PW	PL	Ratio	SW	SL	Ratio
1.	Brazil	10	5	5	0	376	333	1.129	15	4	3.750
2.	Cuba	8	5	3	2	400	367	1.089	11	8	1.375
3.	Argentina	8	5	3	2	457	433	1.055	11	9	1.222
4.	United States	7	5	2	3	379	401	0.945	8	9	0.888
5.	Venezuela	7	5	2	3	430	450	0.955	8	12	0.666
6.	Canada	5	5	0	5	355	427	0.831	2	15	0.133

Venue: Catamarca

- Thursday October 1

Cuba	3 – 0	United States	25-16 25-23 25-19
Brazil	3 – 0	Canada	25-18 28-26 25-19
Argentina	3 – 2	Venezuela	25-23 24-26 25-17 25-27 15-12

- Friday October 2

Venezuela	3 – 2	United States	21-25 27-25 22-25 25-15 15-09
Brazil	3 – 2	Cuba	25-21 26-28 22-25 27-25 16-14
Argentina	3 – 1	Canada	23-25 25-19 25-20 25-20

Venue: Tucumán

- Sunday October 4

Brazil	3 – 0	United States	32-30 25-16 25-22
Venezuela	3 – 1	Canada	25-18 25-22 22-25 25-22

- Monday October 5

Brazil	3 – 0	Venezuela	25-18 25-16 25-21
Argentina	3 – 0	Cuba	25-23 25-18 25-21

Venue: Salta

- Wednesday October 7

Cuba	3 – 0	Canada	25-16 25-18 25-21
United States	3 – 0	Argentina	25-22 25-23 25-23

- Thursday October 8

Cuba	3 – 0	Venezuela	25-20 25-20 25-23
United States	3 – 0	Canada	27-25 27-25 25-16
Brazil	3 – 2	Argentina	25-23 25-16 21-25 21-25 15-13

== Final round ==
Semi-finals
1998-10-10 – Mar del Plata
Argentina	3
Cuba	2
1998-10-10 – Mar del Plata
Brazil	3
United States	2

Final
1998-10-11 – Mar del Plata
Argentina	2
Brazil	3
3rd place
1998-10-11 – Mar del Plata
Cuba	3
United States	2

=== Semi-finals ===
Venue: Mar del Plata

- Saturday October 10

Argentina	3 – 2	Cuba	20-25 23-25 25-19 25-23 15-10
Brazil	3 – 2	United States	20-25 25-23 25-15 23-25 15-11

=== Finals ===
Venue: Mar del Plata

- Sunday October 11 — Bronze Medal Match

Cuba	3 – 2	United States	25-21 21-25 24-26 25-23 15-12

- Sunday October 11 — Gold Medal Match

Argentina	2 – 3	Brazil	19-25 25-21 25-22 22-25 25-27

== Final ranking ==
Place	Team
1.	Brazil
2.	Argentina
3.	Cuba
4.	United States
5.	Venezuela
6.	Canada

1998 Men's America's Cup winners

Brazil
First title
