= 2016 Men's U23 Pan-American Volleyball Cup =

Tournament details
- Host country: Mexico
- Dates: September 5 – 10, 2016
- Teams: 9
- Venue: 1 (in Guanajuato City host cities)

Final positions
- Champions: Argentina (1st title)

Tournament awards
- MVP: Germán Johansen (ARG)

The 2016 Men's U23 Pan-American Volleyball Cup was the third edition of the bi-annual men's volleyball tournament, played by nine countries from September 5–10, 2016 in Guanajuato City, Mexico.

== Competing nations ==
Group A	Group B	Group C
Colombia; Guatemala; Mexico	Cuba; Dominican Republic; Trinidad and Tobago	Argentina; Chile; Saint Lucia

== Preliminary round ==
- All times are in Central Standard Time (UTC−06:00)

=== Group A ===
Pos	Team	Pld	W	L	Pts	SPW	SPL	SPR	SW	SL	SR	Qualification
1	Colombia	2	2	0	9	172	134	1.284	6	1	6.000	Quarterfinals
2	Mexico	2	1	1	5	175	184	0.951	4	4	1.000	Quarterfinals
3	Guatemala	2	0	2	1	142	171	0.830	1	6	0.167	

Date	Time		Score		Set 1	Set 2	Set 3	Set 4	Set 5	Total	Report
5 Sep	18:00	Mexico	3–1	Guatemala	21–25	25–21	25–23	25–18		96–87	P2 P3
6 Sep	18:00	Colombia	3–0	Guatemala	25–14	25–20	25–21			75–55	P2 P3
7 Sep	20:00	Mexico	1–3	Colombia	25–22	20–25	19–25	15–25		79–97	P2 P3

=== Group B ===
Pos	Team	Pld	W	L	Pts	SPW	SPL	SPR	SW	SL	SR	Qualification
1	Cuba	2	2	0	10	150	84	1.786	6	0	MAX	Semifinals
2	Dominican Republic	2	1	1	5	126	126	1.000	3	3	1.000	Quarterfinals
3	Trinidad and Tobago	2	0	2	0	84	150	0.560	0	6	0.000	

Date	Time		Score		Set 1	Set 2	Set 3	Set 4	Set 5	Total	Report
5 Sep	20:00	Trinidad and Tobago	0–3	Dominican Republic	16–25	20–25	15–25			51–75	P2 P3
6 Sep	16:00	Cuba	3–0	Trinidad and Tobago	25–11	25–15	25–7			75–33	P2 P3
7 Sep	18:00	Dominican Republic	0–3	Cuba	15–25	17–25	19–25			51–75	P2 P3

=== Group C ===
Pos	Team	Pld	W	L	Pts	SPW	SPL	SPR	SW	SL	SR	Qualification
1	Argentina	2	2	0	10	150	87	1.724	6	0	MAX	Semifinals
2	Chile	2	1	1	5	130	98	1.327	3	3	1.000	Quarterfinals
3	Saint Lucia	2	0	2	0	55	150	0.367	0	6	0.000	

Date	Time		Score		Set 1	Set 2	Set 3	Set 4	Set 5	Total	Report
5 Sep	15:00	Saint Lucia	0–3	Argentina	14–25	10–25	8–25			32–75	P2 P3
6 Sep	20:00	Chile	3–0	Saint Lucia	25–9	25–6	25–8			75–23	P2 P3
7 Sep	16:00	Argentina	3–0	Chile	25–18	25–18	25–19			75–55	P2 P3

== Final round ==
=== Championship bracket ===
Quarterfinals
A1	Colombia	3
B2	Dominican Republic	1
C2	Chile	3
A2	Mexico	0

Semifinals
C1	Argentina	3
A1	Colombia	0
B1	Cuba	3
C2	Chile	0

Finals
C1	Argentina	3
B1	Cuba	1
Third place
A1	Colombia	0
C2	Chile	3

=== Classification 9 ===
Date	Time		Score		Set 1	Set 2	Set 3	Set 4	Set 5	Total	Report
8 Sep	16:00	Trinidad and Tobago	3–0	Saint Lucia	25–16	25–17	25–18			75–51	P2 P3

=== Quarterfinals ===
Date	Time		Score		Set 1	Set 2	Set 3	Set 4	Set 5	Total	Report
8 Sep	18:00	Colombia	3–1	Dominican Republic	25–22	25–22	18–25	25–17		93–86	P2 P3
8 Sep	20:00	Chile	3–0	Mexico	25–20	25–19	25–18			75–57	P2 P3

=== Semifinals ===
Date	Time		Score		Set 1	Set 2	Set 3	Set 4	Set 5	Total	Report
9 Sep	18:00	Argentina	3–0	Colombia	25–19	25–18	25–18			75–55	P2 P3
9 Sep	20:00	Cuba	3–0	Chile	25–21	25–14	25–22			75–57	P2 P3

=== Seventh place match ===
Date	Time		Score		Set 1	Set 2	Set 3	Set 4	Set 5	Total	Report
9 Sep	16:00	Guatemala	3–0	Trinidad and Tobago	25–18	25–20	25–20			75–58	P2 P3

=== Fifth place match ===
Date	Time		Score		Set 1	Set 2	Set 3	Set 4	Set 5	Total	Report
10 Sep	16:00	Mexico	3–2	Dominican Republic	37–35	25–19	23–25	21–25	15–12	121–116	P2 P3

=== Bronze medal match ===
Date	Time		Score		Set 1	Set 2	Set 3	Set 4	Set 5	Total	Report
10 Sep	18:00	Colombia	0–3	Chile	20–25	16–25	23–25			59–75	P2 P3

=== Final ===
Date	Time		Score		Set 1	Set 2	Set 3	Set 4	Set 5	Total	Report
10 Sep	20:00	Argentina	3–1	Cuba	25–19	21–25	25–19	25–20		96–83	P2 P3

== Final standing ==
Rank	Team
1st place, gold medalist(s)	Argentina
2nd place, silver medalist(s)	Cuba
3rd place, bronze medalist(s)	Chile
4	Colombia
5	Mexico
6	Dominican Republic
7	Guatemala
8	Trinidad and Tobago
9	Saint Lucia

Qualified for FIVB U23 World Championship

2016 Men's U23 Pan-American Cup champions

Argentina
1st title

== Individual awards ==
- Most valuable player
  - Germán Johansen (ARG)
- Best scorer
  - José Rubio (MEX)
- Best setter
  - Matías Sánchez (ARG)
- Best Opposite
  - Osniel Rendón (CUB)
- Best Outside Hitters
  - Miguel Ángel López (CUB)
  - Nicolás Lazo (ARG)
- Best Middle Blockers
  - Gastón Fernández (ARG)
  - Christian Arce (MEX)
- Best server
  - Miguel Ángel López (CUB)
- Best digger
  - Luis Santacruz (GUA)
- Best receiver
  - Jeyson Morelos (COL)
- Best libero
  - Luis Santacruz (GUA)
