= Volleyball America's Cup =

Sporting tournament

The America's Cup was a continental cup in men's volleyball for North and South American nations organized by CSV and NORCECA with the first edition in 1998 and the last in 2008.

Seventeen years after the last edition the tournament returned in 2025 as a new men's format with the CSV's approval and gaining a women's edition. In its new format the competition is based on points in a round-robin format and expected to take place annually.

== Results ==
America's Cup
Year	Host	Champions	Runners-up	3rd place
1998; Details	Mar del Plata, Argentina	Brazil	Argentina	Cuba
1999; Details	Tampa, United States	Brazil	United States	Argentina
2000; Details	São Bernardo, Brazil	Cuba	Brazil	United States
2001; Details	Buenos Aires, Argentina	Brazil	Cuba	Argentina
2005; Details	São Leopoldo, Brazil	United States	Brazil	Cuba
2007; Details	Manaus, Brazil	United States	Brazil	Cuba
2008; Details	Cuiabá, Brazil	Cuba	Brazil	Venezuela

=== Medal table ===
Rank	Nation	Gold	Silver	Bronze	Total
1	Brazil	3	4	0	7
2	Cuba	2	1	3	6
3	United States	2	1	1	4
4	Argentina	0	1	2	3
5	Venezuela	0	0	1	1
Totals (5 entries)		7	7	7	21

== Details ==
Team	(Argentina); 1998	(United States); 1999	(Brazil); 2000	(Argentina); 2001	(Brazil); 2005	(Brazil); 2007	(Brazil); 2008	Total
Argentina	2nd	3rd	4th	3rd	4th	4th	4th	7
Brazil	1st	1st	2nd	1st	2nd	2nd	2nd	7
Canada	6th	5th	5th	6th	5th	5th	-	6
Cuba	3rd	4th	1st	2nd	3rd	3rd	1st	7
Dominican Republic	-	-	-	-	-	6th	-	1
Mexico	-	-	-	-	-	-	6th	1
United States	4th	2nd	3rd	4th	1st	1st	5th	7
Venezuela	5th	6th	6th	5th	6th	-	3rd	6

== See also ==
- Copa América (men's volleyball)
- Copa América (women's volleyball)
