= 2018 Men's Pan-American Volleyball Cup =

Tournament details
- Host country: Mexico
- Dates: 28 August–2 September
- Teams: 12
- Venue: 1 (in 1 host city)

Final positions
- Champions: Argentina (2nd title)

Tournament awards
- MVP: (Argentina) Ezequiel Palacios

The 2018 Men's Pan-American Volleyball Cup was the 13th edition of the annual men's volleyball tournament. It was held in Córdoba, Veracruz, Mexico from 28 August to 2 September. Twelve teams competed and the top five ranked teams at the end of the tournament will be qualified to the 2019 Pan American Games in Lima, Peru.

Argentina won the second straight title after defeating Brazil 3–2 in the final. Ezequiel Palacios was awarded the Most Valuable Player.

== Pools composition ==
Pool A	Pool B	Pool C
Chile	Brazil	Argentina
Cuba	Canada	Peru
Guatemala	Colombia	Puerto Rico
Mexico	Dominican Republic	United States

== Pool standing procedure ==
1. Number of matches won
2. Match points
3. Points ratio
4. Sets ratio
5. Result of the last match between the tied teams

Match won 3–0: 5 match points for the winner, 0 match points for the loser
Match won 3–1: 4 match points for the winner, 1 match point for the loser
Match won 3–2: 3 match points for the winner, 2 match points for the loser

== Preliminary round ==
- All times are Central Daylight Time (UTC−06:00).

=== Group A ===
Pos	Team	Pld	W	L	Pts	SPW	SPL	SPR	SW	SL	SR	Qualification
1	Cuba	3	3	0	12	276	226	1.221	9	3	3.000	Quarterfinals
2	Mexico	3	2	1	12	248	233	1.064	8	3	2.667	Quarterfinals
3	Chile	3	1	2	6	221	220	1.005	4	6	0.667	7th–10th classification
4	Guatemala	3	0	3	0	163	229	0.712	0	9	0.000	

Date	Time		Score		Set 1	Set 2	Set 3	Set 4	Set 5	Total	Report
28 Aug	13:00	Chile	1–3	Cuba	22–25	25–17	19–25	21–25		87–92	P2 P3
28 Aug	21:00	Mexico	3–0	Guatemala	25–18	25–20	29–27			79–65	P2 P3
29 Aug	11:00	Cuba	3–0	Guatemala	25–16	25–13	25–16			75–45	P2 P3
29 Aug	21:00	Mexico	3–0	Chile	25–22	25–18	25–19			75–59	P2 P3
30 Aug	13:00	Guatemala	0–3	Chile	18–25	18–25	17–25			53–75	P2 P3
30 Aug	21:00	Mexico	2–3	Cuba	25–20	16–25	25–21	12–25	16–18	94–109	P2 P3

=== Group B ===
Pos	Team	Pld	W	L	Pts	SPW	SPL	SPR	SW	SL	SR	Qualification
1	Brazil	3	3	0	15	227	166	1.367	9	0	MAX	Semifinals
2	Canada	3	2	1	9	231	219	1.055	6	4	1.500	Quarterfinals
3	Dominican Republic	3	1	2	5	188	222	0.847	3	6	0.500	7th–10th classification
4	Colombia	3	0	3	1	220	253	0.870	1	9	0.111	7th–10th classification

Date	Time		Score		Set 1	Set 2	Set 3	Set 4	Set 5	Total	Report
28 Aug	15:00	Brazil	3–0	Dominican Republic	25–21	25–19	25–14			75–54	P2 P3
28 Aug	17:00	Canada	3–1	Colombia	25–19	23–25	25–22	25–22		98–88	P2 P3
29 Aug	13:00	Colombia	0–3	Brazil	25–27	17–25	12–25			54–77	P2 P3
29 Aug	17:00	Dominican Republic	0–3	Canada	20–25	20–25	16–25			56–75	P2 P3
30 Aug	15:00	Colombia	0–3	Dominican Republic	23–25	24–26	25–27			72–78	P2 P3
30 Aug	17:00	Brazil	3–0	Canada	25–20	25–15	25–23			75–58	P2 P3

=== Group C ===
Pos	Team	Pld	W	L	Pts	SPW	SPL	SPR	SW	SL	SR	Qualification
1	Argentina	3	3	0	14	253	201	1.259	9	1	9.000	Semifinals
2	Puerto Rico	3	2	1	10	261	244	1.070	7	4	1.750	Quarterfinals
3	United States	3	1	2	6	215	232	0.927	4	6	0.667	7th–10th classification
4	Peru	3	0	3	0	174	226	0.770	0	9	0.000	

Date	Time		Score		Set 1	Set 2	Set 3	Set 4	Set 5	Total	Report
28 Aug	11:00	United States	3–0	Peru	25–21	25–14	26–24			76–59	P2 P3
28 Aug	19:00	Argentina	3–1	Puerto Rico	20–25	25–15	33–31	25–17		103–88	P2 P3
29 Aug	15:00	Peru	0–3	Argentina	20–25	22–25	15–25			57–75	P2 P3
29 Aug	19:00	Puerto Rico	3–1	United States	23–25	25–18	25–19	25–21		98–83	P2 P3
30 Aug	11:00	Peru	0–3	Puerto Rico	17–25	20–25	21–25			58–75	P2 P3
30 Aug	19:00	United States	0–3	Argentina	19–25	21–25	16–25			56–75	P2 P3

== Final round ==
=== Championship bracket ===
Quarterfinals
A2	Mexico	1
C2	Puerto Rico	3
A1	Cuba	3
B2	Canada	0

Semifinals
B1	Brazil	3
C2	Puerto Rico	1
C1	Argentina	3
A1	Cuba	1
5th place
A2	Mexico	3
B2	Canada	1

Final
B1	Brazil	2
C1	Argentina	3
3rd place
C2	Puerto Rico	1
A1	Cuba	3

=== 7th–10th places bracket ===
Classification 7–10
A3	Chile	3
B4	Colombia	0
B3	Dominican Republic	0
C3	United States	3

7th place
A3	Chile	1
C3	United States	3
9th place
B4	Colombia	3
B3	Dominican Republic	0

==== 11th place match ====
Date	Time		Score		Set 1	Set 2	Set 3	Set 4	Set 5	Total	Report
31 Aug	13:00	Peru	1–3	Guatemala	16–25	25–23	23–25	19–25		83–98	P2 P3

==== Classification 7th–10th ====
Date	Time		Score		Set 1	Set 2	Set 3	Set 4	Set 5	Total	Report
31 Aug	15:00	Chile	3–0	Colombia	25–14	25–19	25–16			75–49	P2 P3
31 Aug	17:00	Dominican Republic	0–3	United States	23–25	17–25	26–28			66–78	P2 P3

==== Quarterfinals ====
Date	Time		Score		Set 1	Set 2	Set 3	Set 4	Set 5	Total	Report
31 Aug	19:00	Cuba	3–0	Canada	25–15	25–23	25–23			75–61	P2 P3
31 Aug	21:00	Mexico	1–3	Puerto Rico	20–25	16–25	25–18	22–25		83–93	P2 P3

==== 9th place match ====
Date	Time		Score		Set 1	Set 2	Set 3	Set 4	Set 5	Total	Report
1 Sep	15:00	Colombia	3–0	Dominican Republic	25–23	25–23	27–25			77–71	P2 P3

==== 7th place match ====
Date	Time		Score		Set 1	Set 2	Set 3	Set 4	Set 5	Total	Report
1 Sep	17:00	Chile	1–3	United States	24–26	18–25	29–27	22–25		93–103	P2 P3

==== Semifinals ====
Date	Time		Score		Set 1	Set 2	Set 3	Set 4	Set 5	Total	Report
1 Sep	19:00	Argentina	3–1	Cuba	21–25	25–18	25–19	25–20		96–82	P2 P3
1 Sep	21:00	Brazil	3–1	Puerto Rico	25–27	25–14	25–20	33–31		108–92	P2 P3

==== 5th place match ====
Date	Time		Score		Set 1	Set 2	Set 3	Set 4	Set 5	Total	Report
2 Sep	15:00	Mexico	3–1	Canada	25–18	25–20	20–25	25–17		95–80	P2 P3

==== 3rd place match ====
Date	Time		Score		Set 1	Set 2	Set 3	Set 4	Set 5	Total	Report
2 Sep	17:00	Cuba	3–1	Puerto Rico	20–25	25–9	25–18	25–17		95–69	P2 P3

==== Final ====
Date	Time		Score		Set 1	Set 2	Set 3	Set 4	Set 5	Total	Report
2 Sep	19:00	Argentina	3–2	Brazil	25–27	25–17	25–22	25–27	15–10	115–103	P2 P3

== Final standing ==
Rank	Team
1st place, gold medalist(s)	Argentina
2nd place, silver medalist(s)	Brazil
3rd place, bronze medalist(s)	Cuba
4	Puerto Rico
5	Mexico
6	Canada
7	United States
8	Chile
9	Colombia
10	Dominican Republic
11	Guatemala
12	Peru

Qualified for the 2019 Pan American Games
Qualified for the 2019 Pan American Games as a host

2018 Men's Pan-American Cup

Argentina
2nd title

14-man roster
Matías Sánchez, Liam Ernesto Arreche, Jan Martínez Franchi, Alejandro Toro, Gaspar Bitar, Luciano Palonsky, Nicolás Bruno (c),
Gastón Fernández, Joaquín Gallego, Ezequiel Palacios, Nicolás Zerba, Germán Johansen, Santiago Danani, Franco Massimino
Head coach
Alejandro Grossi

== Individual awards ==
- Most valuable player
  (Argentina) Ezequiel Palacios
- Best setter
  (Argentina) Matías Sánchez
- Best Outside Hitters
  (Argentina) Ezequiel Palacios
  (Cuba) Miguel Ángel López
- Best Middle Blockers
  (Brazil) Flávio Gualberto
  (Cuba) Roamy Alonso
- Best Opposite
  (Brazil) Alan Souza
- Best scorer
  (Brazil) Alan Souza
- Best server
  (United States) David Wieczorek
- Best libero
  (Cuba) Yonder García
- Best digger
  (Cuba) Yonder García
- Best receiver
  (Cuba) Yonder García
