= Abrahan Alfonso Gavilán =

Cuban volleyball player (born 1995)

Personal information
- Nationality: Cuban
- Born: 23 February 1995 (age 31); Havana, Cuba
- Height: 1.97 m (6 ft 6 in)
- Weight: 72 kg (159 lb)
- Spike: 343 cm (135 in)
- Block: 320 cm (126 in)

Volleyball information
- Position: Outside hitter
- Number: 12 (national team)

Career
Years	Teams
2014	La Habana

National team
2013–2016	Cuba

Abrahan Alfonso Gavilán (born 23 February 1995) is a Cuban male volleyball player. He was part of the Cuba men's national volleyball team at the 2014 FIVB World Championship in Poland. He played for La Habana.

Gavilán was born on February 23, 1995, in Havana. He was part of the national team for five years, ending in 2016. In 2018, he resumed his career in Turkey for four years. Afterwards, he went to play in Italy in the A2 series where he was champion of the A2 Italian Cup and champion of the A2 Supercup. He now plays in Kuwait.

He did not play in Rio Olympics in 2016 for being one of the six players of the Cuban national volleyball team that were remanded into custody suspected of committing aggravated rape in July 2016 in Tampere, Finland. In September 2016 he was sentenced to five years behind bars.

== Awards ==
- Italian Supercup A2 MVP — 2024

== Clubs ==
- La Habana (2014)
- Sorgun Belediye Sport Turquia (2018–21)
- Afyon Belediye Sport (2020–21)
- Kiziltepe Sport (2021–22)
- Atlantide Pallavolo Brescia Italia (2022–24)
