= 2001 Volleyball America's Cup =

The 2001 Volleyball America's Cup was the fourth edition of the annual men's volleyball tournament, played by six countries from North-, Central- and South America. The tournament was held from September 28 to October 7, 2001, in Buenos Aires, Argentina.

== Main round ==
	Team	Points	G	W	L	PW	PL	Ratio	SW	SL	Ratio
1.	Cuba	10	5	5	0	461	393	1.173	15	4	3.750
2.	Brazil	9	5	4	1	443	353	1.255	14	4	3.500
3.	United States	7	5	2	3	403	404	0.997	8	10	0.800
4.	Argentina	7	5	2	3	351	376	0.933	7	9	0.777
5.	Venezuela	6	5	1	4	354	409	0.865	5	12	0.416
6.	Canada	6	5	1	4	312	389	0.802	3	13	0.230

- Friday September 28

Cuba	3 – 1	United States	16-25 25-21 25-14 27-25
Argentina	3 – 0	Canada	25-20 25-15 25-16

- Saturday September 29

Brazil	3 – 0	Venezuela	25-20 25-15 25-16
Cuba	3 – 0	Argentina	25-22 25-21 25-18

- Sunday September 30

Brazil	3 – 0	Canada	25-17 25-14 25-13
United States	3 – 1	Argentina	23-25 25-23 25-21 25-15

- Monday October 1

Cuba	3 – 2	Brazil	25-27 25-22 21-25 25-23 25-23
Venezuela	3 – 0	United States	25-20 25-21 27-25

- Tuesday October 2

Cuba	3 – 0	Canada	25-15 25-16 25-22
Argentina	3 – 0	Venezuela	25-23 25-22 25-16

- Wednesday October 3

Canada	3 – 1	Venezuela	25-21 21-25 25-20 25-23
Brazil	3 – 1	United States	22-25 25-16 25-14 26-24

- Thursday October 4

United States	3 – 0	Canada	25-18 25-17 25-17
Cuba	3 – 1	Venezuela	25-17 25-15 22-25 25-19
Brazil	3 – 0	Argentina	25-20 25-19 25-19

== Final round ==
Semi-finals
2001-10-06 – Buenos Aires
Brazil	3
United States	0
2001-10-06 – Buenos Aires
Cuba	3
Argentina	2

Final
2001-10-07 – Buenos Aires
Brazil	3
Cuba	0
3rd place
2001-10-07 – Buenos Aires
United States	2
Argentina	3

=== Semi-finals ===
- Saturday 2001-10-06

Brazil	3 – 0	United States	25-22 25-20 25-18
Cuba	3 – 2	Argentina	25-17 18-25 19-25 25-14 15-13

=== Finals ===
- Sunday 2001-10-07 — Bronze-medal match

United States	2 – 3	Argentina	20-25 22-25 25-22 25-23 10-15

- Sunday 2001-10-07 — Gold-medal match

Brazil	3 – 0	Cuba	25-20 25-19 25-23

== Final ranking ==
Place	Team
1.	Brazil
2.	Cuba
3.	Argentina
4.	United States
5.	Venezuela
6.	Canada

2001 Men's America's Cup winners

Brazil
Third title

== Awards ==
- Most valuable player
  - Angel Dennis (CUB)
- Best spiker
  - Marcos Milinkovic (ARG)
- Best receiver
  - Nalbert Bitencourt (BRA)
- Best blocker
  - Pavel Pimienta (CUB)
- Best digger
  - Sérgio Dutra Santos (BRA)
- Best server
  - Gustavo Endres (BRA)
- Best setter
  - Alain Roca (CUB)
