= 1999 Volleyball America's Cup =

The 1999 Volleyball America's Cup was the second edition of the annual men's volleyball tournament, played by six countries from North-, Central- and South America. The tournament was held from October 14 to October 23, 1999, in St. Petersburg and Tampa, Florida (United States).

== Main Round ==
	Team	Points	G	W	L	PW	PL	Ratio	SW	SL	Ratio
1.	Brazil	10	5	5	0				15	0	MAX
2.	United States	9	5	4	1				12	5	2.400
3.	Cuba	8	5	3	2				10	9	1.111
4.	Argentina	7	5	2	3				8	11	0.727
5.	Canada	6	5	1	4				5	12	0.416
6.	Venezuela	5	5	0	5				2	15	0.133

Venue: Tampa, Florida

- Thursday 1999-10-14

Brazil	3 – 0	Canada	25-23 29-27 25-19
United States	3 – 0	Venezuela	25-23 26-24 25-20

- Friday 1999-10-15

Brazil	3 – 0	Cuba	25-20 25-12 28-26
Argentina	3 – 2	Venezuela	25-23 19-25 21-25 26-24 15-13

- Saturday 1999-10-16

Argentina	3 – 0	Canada	32-30 25-16 25-19
United States	3 – 1	Cuba	25-17 25-21 23-25 25-15

Venue: St. Petersburg, Florida

- Sunday 1999-10-17

Brazil	3 – 0	Argentina	25-22 25-17 25-14
Canada	3 – 0	Venezuela	25-19 25-19 25-18

- Monday 1999-10-18

Cuba	3 – 1	Canada	24-26 25-21 25-18 25-15
Brazil	3 – 0	United States	25-13 25-22 25-20

- Tuesday 1999-10-19

Cuba	3 – 0	Venezuela	25-20 25-22 25-17
United States	3 – 0	Argentina	26-24 25-13 25-20

- Thursday 1999-10-21

Brazil	3 – 0	Venezuela	25-20 25-15 27-25
Cuba	3 – 2	Argentina	19-25 25-22 25-20 21-25 21-19
United States	3 – 1	Canada	125-20 25-12 29-31 25-18

== Final round ==
Semi-finals
1999-10-22 – Tampa, Florida
Brazil	3
Argentina	0
1999-10-22 – Tampa, Florida
United States	3
Cuba	0

Final
1999-10-23 – Tampa, Florida
Brazil	3
United States	1
3rd place
1999-10-23 – Tampa, Florida
Argentina	3
Cuba	0

=== Semi-finals ===
Venue: Tampa, Florida

- Friday 1999-10-22

Brazil	3 – 0	Argentina	25-22 25-21 25-13
United States	3 – 0	Cuba	25-19 25-23 25-16

=== Finals ===
Venue: Tampa, Florida

- Saturday 1999-10-23 — Bronze Medal Match

Argentina	3 – 0	Cuba	25-16 25-21 25-19

- Saturday 1999-10-23 — Gold Medal Match

Brazil	3 – 1	United States	24-26 25-20 25-23 25-13

== Final ranking ==
Place	Team
1.	Brazil
2.	United States
3.	Argentina
4.	Cuba
5.	Canada
6.	Venezuela

1999 Men's America's Cup winners

Brazil
Second title
