= Mario Rivera (volleyball) =

Cuban volleyball player

Personal information
- Full name: Mario Luis Rivera Sánchez
- Born: 26 October 1982 (age 44); Pinar del Río, Cuba
- Height: 1.80 m (5 ft 11 in)
- Weight: 92 kg (203 lb)
- Spike: 343 cm (135 in)
- Block: 323 cm (127 in)

Volleyball information
- Position: Outside hitter
- Number: 19 (national team)

Career
Years	Teams
2014	Pinar del Rio

National team
2014–2016	Cuba

Mario Luis Rivera Sánchez (born 26 October 1982) is a Cuban male volleyball player. He was part of the Cuba men's national volleyball team at the 2016 Summer Olympics in Rio de Janeiro. On club level he played for Pinar del Rio.
