= Argentina men's national volleyball team =

Argentina
- Nickname(s): La Selección (The Selection)
- Association: Argentine Volleyball Federation (FeVA)
- Confederation: CSV
- Head coach: Horacio Dileo
- FIVB ranking: 14 (3 August 2026)

Uniforms
Home	Away

Summer Olympics
- Appearances: 9 (First in 1984)
- Best result: (1988, 2020)

World Championship
- Appearances: 13 (First in 1960)
- Best result: (1982)

World Cup
- Appearances: 7 (First in 1985)
- Best result: 5th (1985, 2015, 2019)

South American Championship
- Appearances: 32 (First in 1951)
- Best result: (1964, 2023)
- feva.org.ar/masculina
Honours
Event	1st	2nd	3rd
Olympic Games	0	0	2
World Championship	0	0	1
Pan American Games	3	1	3
Pan-American Cup	2	5	2
America's Cup	0	1	2
South American Games	5	0	0
South American Championship	2	19	8
Copa Sudamericana	1	1	0
Universiade	0	0	1
Total	13	27	19
Olympics Games
Bronze medal – third place	1988 Seoul	Team
Bronze medal – third place	2020 Tokyo	Team
World Championship
Bronze medal – third place	1982 Argentina	Team
Pan American Games
Gold medal – first place	1995 Mar del Plata	Team
Gold medal – first place	2015 Toronto	Team
Gold medal – first place	2019 Lima	Team
Silver medal – second place	2023 Santiago	Team
Bronze medal – third place	1963 São Paulo	Team
Bronze medal – third place	1983 Caracas	Team
Bronze medal – third place	1991 Havana	Team
Bronze medal – third place	2011 Guadalajara	Team
Pan-American Cup
Gold medal – first place	2017 Gatineau	
Gold medal – first place	2018 Córdoba	
Silver medal – second place	2010 San Juan	
Silver medal – second place	2012 Santo Domingo	
Silver medal – second place	2015 Reno	
Silver medal – second place	2016 Mexico City	
Silver medal – second place	2019 Colima City	
Bronze medal – third place	2013 Mexico City	
Bronze medal – third place	2014 Tijuana	
America's Cup
Silver medal – second place	1998 Mar del Plata	
Bronze medal – third place	1999 Tampa	
Bronze medal – third place	2001 Buenos Aires	
South American Games
Gold medal – first place	1978 La Paz	Team
Gold medal – first place	1982 Rosario	Team
Gold medal – first place	2010 Medellín	Team
Gold medal – first place	2014 Santiago	Team
Gold medal – first place	2018 Cochabamba	Team
South American Championship
Gold medal – first place	1964 Buenos Aires	
Gold medal – first place	2023 Recife	
Silver medal – second place	1962 Santiago	
Silver medal – second place	1973 Bucaramanga	
Silver medal – second place	1981 Santiago	
Silver medal – second place	1983 São Paulo	
Silver medal – second place	1987 Montevideo	
Silver medal – second place	1989 Curitiba	
Silver medal – second place	1991 Osasco	
Silver medal – second place	1993 Córdoba	
Silver medal – second place	1995 Porto Alegre	
Silver medal – second place	1999 Córdoba	
Silver medal – second place	2001 Cali	
Silver medal – second place	2005 Lages	
Silver medal – second place	2007 Santiago / Viña del Mar	
Silver medal – second place	2009 Bogotá	
Silver medal – second place	2011 Cuiabá	
Silver medal – second place	2013 Cabo Frio	
Silver medal – second place	2015 Maceió	
Silver medal – second place	2019 Santiago	
Silver medal – second place	2021 Brasília	
Bronze medal – third place	1961 Lima	
Bronze medal – third place	1971 Montevideo	
Bronze medal – third place	1975 Asunción	
Bronze medal – third place	1977 Chiclayo / Lima / Trujillo	
Bronze medal – third place	1985 Caracas	
Bronze medal – third place	1997 Caracas	
Bronze medal – third place	2003 Rio de Janeiro	
Bronze medal – third place	2017 Santiago / Temuco	
Copa Sudamericana
Gold medal – first place	2026 Cochabamba	
Silver medal – second place	2025 Betim	
Universiade
Bronze medal – third place	2015 Gwangju	Team

The Argentina national volleyball team represents Argentina in international men's volleyball and is controlled by the Argentine Volleyball Federation (Federación del Voleibol Argentino in Spanish, and abbreviated "FeVA").

The Argentina team made their international debut at the South American Championship in Rio de Janeiro in 1951, claiming fourth place. They competed in their first World Championship 1960 in the same city, where they finished 11th. The team's best achievements are the bronze medal at the 1982 World Championship, the bronze medal at the 1988 Summer Olympics and two gold medals at the 1995 and 2015 Pan American Games. Throughout the 1990s it was usually ranked among the first ten.

In recent years, though without achieving any medal, the team finished 4th at the 2000 and 5th at the 2004, 2012 and 2016 Summer Olympics. However, they achieved another milestone of achievement when they won another Bronze medal at the Volleyball at the 2020 Summer Olympics

At continental level, overshadowed by volleyball power Brazil, Argentina won two gold medals at the South American Men's Volleyball Championships (in 1964 and 2023), nineteen silvers and eight bronzes. Volleyball was introduced in Argentina by the YMCA - Youth Christian Association in 1912. The Argentine Volleyball Federation was created in 1932, sharing the same management as Basketball. The number of fans slowly started to grow as a result of its broadcasting.

== Competition record ==
=== Olympics Games ===
Champions Runners up Third place Fourth place

Olympics Games record
Year	Round	Position	GP	MW	ML	SW	SL	Squad
(Japan) 1964	Did not qualify							
(Mexico) 1968	Did not qualify							
(West Germany) 1972	Did not qualify							
(Canada) 1976	Did not qualify							
(Soviet Union) 1980	Did not qualify							
(United States) 1984	Group stage	6th	6	2	4	11	13	Squad
(South Korea) 1988	Semifinals	3rd	7	4	3	14	12	Squad
(Spain) 1992	Did not qualify							
(United States) 1996	Quarterfinals	8th	8	3	5	13	18	Squad
(Australia) 2000	Semifinals	4th	8	3	5	11	18	Squad
(Greece) 2004	Quarterfinals	5th	6	3	3	14	12	Squad
(China) 2008	Did not qualify							
(United Kingdom) 2012	Quarterfinals	5th	6	3	3	10	10	Squad
(Brazil) 2016	Quarterfinals	5th	6	4	2	13	7	Squad
(Japan) 2020	Semifinals	3rd	8	5	3	18	17	Squad
(France) 2024	Preliminary round	11th	3	0	3	1	9	Squad
(United States) 2028	To be determined							
(Australia) 2032	To be determined							
Total	0 Title	9/18	58	27	31	105	116	—

=== World Championship ===
Champions Runners up Third place Fourth place

World Championship record
Year	Round	Position	GP	MW	ML	SW	SL	Squad
(Czechoslovakia) 1949	Did not compete							
(Soviet Union) 1952	Did not compete							
(France) 1956	Did not compete							
(Brazil) 1960	11th–14th places	11th	5	3	2	9	11	Squad
(Soviet Union) 1962	Did not enter							
(Czechoslovakia) 1966	Did not qualify							
(Bulgaria) 1970	Did not qualify							
(Mexico) 1974	Did not qualify							
(Italy) 1978	21st place match	22nd	10	1	9	7	28	Squad
(Argentina) 1982	Semifinals	3rd	9	7	2	22	13	Squad
(France) 1986	7th place match	7th	8	4	4	15	14	Squad
(Brazil) 1990	5th place match	6th	7	5	2	17	8	Squad
(Greece) 1994	First round	14th	3	0	3	3	9	Squad
(Japan) 1998	11th place match	11th	12	5	7	22	23	Squad
(Argentina) 2002	5th place match	6th	9	7	2	24	13	Squad
(Japan) 2006	Second round	13th	12	3	9	18	32	Squad
(Italy) 2010	9th place match	9th	9	6	3	20	14	Squad
(Poland) 2014	Second round	11th	12	6	6	21	21	Squad
(Italy) (Bulgaria) 2018	Second round	15th	8	3	5	14	19	Squad
(Poland) (Slovenia) 2022	Quarterfinals	8th	5	2	3	11	11	Squad
(Philippines) 2025	Round of 16	9th	4	3	1	9	8	Squad
(Poland) 2027	Future event							
(Qatar) 2029	Future event							
Total	0 Title	14/21	113	55	58	212	224	—

=== World Cup ===
Champions Runners up Third place Fourth place

World Cup record
Year	Round	Position	GP	MW	ML	SW	SL	Squad
(Poland) 1965	Did not compete							
(East Germany) 1969	Did not compete							
(Japan) 1977	Did not compete							
(Japan) 1981	Did not compete							
(Japan) 1985	Round robin	5th	7	3	4	12	14	Squad
(Japan) 1989	Did not qualify							
(Japan) 1991	Did not qualify							
(Japan) 1995	Round robin	7th	11	5	6	17	20	Squad
(Japan) 1999	Round robin	9th	11	4	7	18	23	Squad
(Japan) 2003	Did not qualify							
(Japan) 2007	Round robin	7th	11	5	6	15	23	Squad
(Japan) 2011	Round robin	7th	11	5	6	21	21	Squad
(Japan) 2015	Round robin	5th	11	7	4	26	16	Squad
(Japan) 2019	Round robin	5th	11	6	5	24	20	Squad
(Japan) 2023	Did not enter							
Total	0 Title	7/15	73	35	38	133	137	—

=== World League ===
Champions Runners up Third place Fourth place

World League record (Defunct)
Year	Round	Position	GP	MW	ML	SW	SL	Squad
(Japan) 1990	Did not compete							
(Italy) 1991	Did not compete							
(Italy) 1992	Did not compete							
(Brazil) 1993	Did not compete							
(Italy) 1994	Did not compete							
(Brazil) 1995	Did not compete							
(Netherlands) 1996	Intercontinental Round	7th	12	4	8	22	26	Squad
(Russia) 1997	Intercontinental Round	8th	12	4	8	20	25	Squad
(Italy) 1998	Intercontinental Round	9th	12	5	7	22	25	Squad
(Argentina) 1999	Final Round	6th	14	4	10	23	32	Squad
(Netherlands) 2000	Intercontinental Round	8th	12	4	8	23	28	Squad
(Poland) 2001	Intercontinental Round	13th	12	2	10	16	32	Squad
(Brazil) 2002	Intercontinental Round	9th	12	4	8	19	26	Squad
(Spain) 2003	Did not compete							
(Italy) 2004	Did not compete							
(Serbia and Montenegro) 2005	Intercontinental Round	10th	12	3	9	18	32	Squad
(Russia) 2006	Intercontinental Round	7th	12	7	5	22	21	Squad
(Poland) 2007	Intercontinental Round	13th	12	0	12	9	36	Squad
(Brazil) 2008	Did not compete							
(Serbia) 2009	Final Round	5th	14	7	7	30	31	Squad
(Argentina) 2010	Final Round	5th	14	0	14	15	42	Squad
(Poland) 2011	Semifinals	4th	17	11	6	37	25	Squad
(Poland) 2012	Intercontinental Round	10th	12	6	6	22	23	Squad
(Argentina) 2013	Final Round	6th	12	1	11	13	34	Squad
(Italy) 2014	Intercontinental Round	13th	12	8	4	29	16	Squad
(Brazil) 2015	Intercontinental Round	11th	12	7	5	26	21	Squad
(Poland) 2016	Intercontinental Round	10th	9	3	6	16	20	Squad
(Brazil) 2017	Intercontinental Round	10th	9	3	6	15	22	Squad
Total	19/28	4th Place	233	83	150	397	517	—

=== Nations League ===
Nations League record
Year	Round	Position	GP	MW	ML	SW	SL	Squad
(France) 2018	Preliminary round	14th	15	4	11	23	34	Squad
(United States) 2019	Preliminary round	7th	15	8	7	33	26	Squad
(Italy) 2021	Preliminary round	9th	15	7	8	23	29	Squad
(Italy) 2022	Preliminary round	9th	12	5	7	24	26	Squad
(Poland) 2023	Quarterfinals	5th	13	9	4	32	21	Squad
(Poland) 2024	Quarterfinals	8th	13	6	7	25	27	Squad
(China) 2025	Preliminary round	13th	12	6	6	24	26	Squad
(China) 2026	Preliminary round	16th	12	3	9	18	31	Squad
(N/A) 2027	qualified							
Total	0 Title	9/9	107	48	59	202	220	—

=== World Grand Champions Cup ===
Champions Runners up Third place Fourth place

World Grand Champions record (Defunct)
Year	Round	Position	GP	MW	ML	SW	SL	Squad
(Japan) 1993	Did not compete							
(Japan) 1997	Did not compete							
(Japan) 2001	Round Robin	6th place	5	0	5	4	15	Squad
(Japan) 2005	Did not compete							
(Japan) 2009	Did not compete							
(Japan) 2013	Did not compete							
(Japan) 2017	Did not compete							
Total	0 Title	1/7	5	0	5	4	15	—

=== Pan American Games ===
Champions Runners up Third place Fourth place

Pan American Games record
Year	Round	Position	GP	MW	ML	SW	SL	Squad
(Mexico) 1955	Did not participate							
(United States) 1959	Did not participate							
(Brazil) 1963	Final Round	3rd	8	5	3	15	12	
(Canada) 1967	Group 7-9	7th	5	2	3	7	10	
(Colombia) 1971	Final Round	6th	8	2	6	7	21	
(Mexico) 1975	Did not participate							
(Puerto Rico) 1979	Did not participate							
(Venezuela) 1983	Semifinals	3rd	7	3	4	13	13	
(United States) 1987	Semifinals	4th	7	3	4	12	13	
(Cuba) 1991	Semifinals	3rd	7	3	4	12	14	
(Argentina) 1995	Final	1st	4	4	0	12	2	
(Canada) 1999	Semifinals	4th	5	3	2	11	7	
(Dominican Republic) 2003	Did not participate							
(Brazil) 2007	Consolation round	6th	5	1	4	4	14	Squad
(Mexico) 2011	Semifinals	3rd	5	4	1	15	14	Squad
(Canada) 2015	Final	1st	6	5	1	15	7	Squad
(Peru) 2019	Final	1st	5	5	0	15	1	Squad
(Chile) 2023	Final	2nd	5	4	1	12	5	Squad
Total	3 Titles	13/18	77	44	33	150	133	—

=== Pan-American Cup ===
Champions Runners up Third place Fourth place

Pan-American Cup record
Year	Round	Position	GP	MW	ML	SW	SL	Squad
(Mexico) 2006	Did not compete							
(Dominican Republic) 2007	Did not compete							
(Canada) 2008	Did not compete							
(Mexico) 2009	Did not compete							
(Puerto Rico) 2010	Final	2nd	4	3	1	9	5	Squad
(Canada) 2011	Quarterfinals	7th	4	2	2	7	6	Squad
(Dominican Republic) 2012	Final	2nd	5	4	1	12	10	Squad
(Mexico) 2013	Semifinals	3rd	5	3	2	10	9	Squad
(Mexico) 2014	Semifinals	3rd	4	3	1	11	7	Squad
(United States) 2015	Final	2nd	5	4	1	13	6	Squad
(Mexico) 2016	Final	2nd	5	4	1	14	5	Squad
(Canada) 2017	Final	1st	5	5	0	15	1	Squad
(Mexico) 2018	Final	1st	5	5	0	15	4	Squad
(Mexico) 2019	Final	2nd	5	3	2	13	7	Squad
(Dominican Republic) 2021	Did not compete							
(Canada) 2022	Did not compete							
(Mexico) 2023	Did not compete							
(Dominican Republic) 2024	Did not compete							
Total	2 Titles	10/18	47	36	11	119	60	—

=== South American Championship ===
Champions Runners up Third place Fourth place

South American Championship record
Year	Round	Position	GP	MW	ML	SW	SL	Squad
(Brazil) 1951	Round robin	4th	3	0	3	1	9	—
(Uruguay) 1956	Did not compete							
(Brazil) 1958	Round robin	4th	4	1	3	6	9	—
(Peru) 1961	Round robin	3rd	4	2	2	9	6	—
(Chile) 1962	Round robin	2nd	6	4	2	12	6	—
(Argentina) 1964	Round robin	1st	4	4	0	12	1	—
(Brazil) 1967	Did not compete							
(Venezuela) 1969	Round robin	5th	7	3	4	11	12	—
(Uruguay) 1971	Round robin	3rd	7	5	2	17	8	—
(Colombia) 1973	Round robin	2nd	4	3	1	9	6	—
(Paraguay) 1975	Round robin	3rd	7	5	2	15	7	—
(Peru) 1977	Round robin	3rd	6	3	3	9	9	—
(Argentina) 1979	Group 5-7	5th	4	2	2	10	8	—
(Chile) 1981	Round robin	2nd	5	4	1	14	3	—
(Brazil) 1983	Final round	2nd	4	3	1	9	3	—
(Venezuela) 1985	Round robin	3rd	5	3	2	9	6	—
(Uruguay) 1987	Round robin	2nd	6	5	1	15	4	—
(Brazil) 1989	Round robin	2nd	6	5	1	17	3	—
(Brazil) 1991	Final	2nd	4	2	2	7	6	—
(Argentina) 1993	Final	2nd	6	4	2	14	5	—
(Brazil) 1995	Final	2nd	4	2	2	8	6	—
(Venezuela) 1997	Final round	3rd	6	4	2	12	6	—
(Argentina) 1999	Final	2nd	4	2	2	7	8	—
(Colombia) 2001	Final round	2nd	3	2	1	6	3	—
(Brazil) 2003	Round robin	3rd	4	2	2	7	6	—
(Brazil) 2005	Round robin	2nd	5	4	1	12	4	—
(Chile) 2007	Final	2nd	5	4	1	12	7	—
(Colombia) 2009	Round robin	2nd	6	5	1	16	4	—
(Brazil) 2011	Round robin	2nd	6	5	1	16	3	—
(Brazil) 2013	Round robin	2nd	4	3	1	11	3	—
(Brazil) 2015	Final	2nd	5	4	1	12	5	—
(Chile) 2017	Semifinals	3rd	5	4	1	14	4	—
(Chile) 2019	Final	2nd	5	3	2	12	6	—
(Brazil) 2021	Round robin	2nd	4	3	1	10	4	—
(Brazil) 2023	Round robin	1st	4	4	0	12	1	—
(Brazil) 2026	Qualified							
Total	2 Titles	33/35	162	109	53	363	181	—

=== Copa Sudamericana ===
Champions Runners up Third place

Copa Sudamericana record
Year	Round	Position	GP	MW	ML	SW	SL	Squad
(Brazil) 2025	Round robin	2nd	4	3	1	9	5	Squad (Note: Argentina played with their "U23" team.)
(Bolivia) 2026	Final	1st	5	5	0	15	5	Squad (Note: Argentina played with their youth and reserve team.)
Total	1 Title	2/2	9	8	1	24	10	—

=== America's Cup ===
Champions Runners up Third place Fourth place

America's Cup record
Year	Round	Position	GP	MW	ML	SW	SL	Squad
(Argentina) 1998	Final	2nd	7	4	3	16	14	Squad
(United States) 1999	Semifinals	3rd	7	3	4	11	14	Squad
(Brazil) 2000	Semifinals	4th	7	3	4	13	14	Squad
(Argentina) 2001	Semifinals	3rd	7	3	4	12	14	Squad
(Brazil) 2005	Semifinals	4th	4	1	3	5	10	Squad
(Brazil) 2007	Semifinals	4th	4	1	3	4	11	Squad
(Brazil) 2008	Semifinals	4th	4	1	3	3	11	Squad
Total	0 Title	7/7	40	16	24	64	88	—

=== South American Games ===
Champions Runners up Third place Fourth place

South American Games record
Year	Round	Position	GP	MW	ML	SW	SL	Squad
(Bolivia) 1978	Round Robin	1st						
(Argentina) 1982	Round Robin	1st						
(Colombia) 2010	Final	1st	5	5	0	15	1	Squad
(Chile) 2014	Final	1st	3	3	0	9	0	Squad
(Bolivia) 2018	Final	1st	5	5	0	15	2	Squad
Total	5 Titles	5/5	13	13	0	39	3	—

=== FIVB Olympic Qualification Tournament ===
Champions Runners up Third place Fourth place

Year	Result	Pld	W	L	SW	SL	PW	PL
(China) 2019	Group F Champion	3	3	0	9	4	298	282
(China) 2023	Group C Third Place	7	5	2	17	10	627	607
Total	1 Title	10	8	2	26	14	925	889

== Team ==
=== Current squad ===
Roster for the 2024 Summer Olympics.

The roster was announced on 3 July 2024.

Head coach: Marcelo Méndez

- 1 Matías Sánchez S
- 3 Jan Martínez Franchi OH
- 7 Facundo Conte OH
- 8 Agustín Loser MB
- 9 Santiago Danani L
- 12 Bruno Lima OP
- 15 Luciano De Cecco (c) S
- 16 Pablo Kukartsev OP
- 17 Luciano Vicentín OH
- 18 Martín Ramos MB
- 21 Luciano Palonsky OH
- 22 Nicolás Zerba MB

=== Notable players ===
- (Argentina) Marcos Milinkovic
- (Argentina) Waldo Kantor
- (Argentina) Javier Weber
- (Argentina) Daniel Castellani
- (Argentina) Hugo Conte
- (Argentina) Raúl Quiroga
- (Argentina) Jon Uriarte
- (Argentina) Luciano De Cecco

== Gallery ==
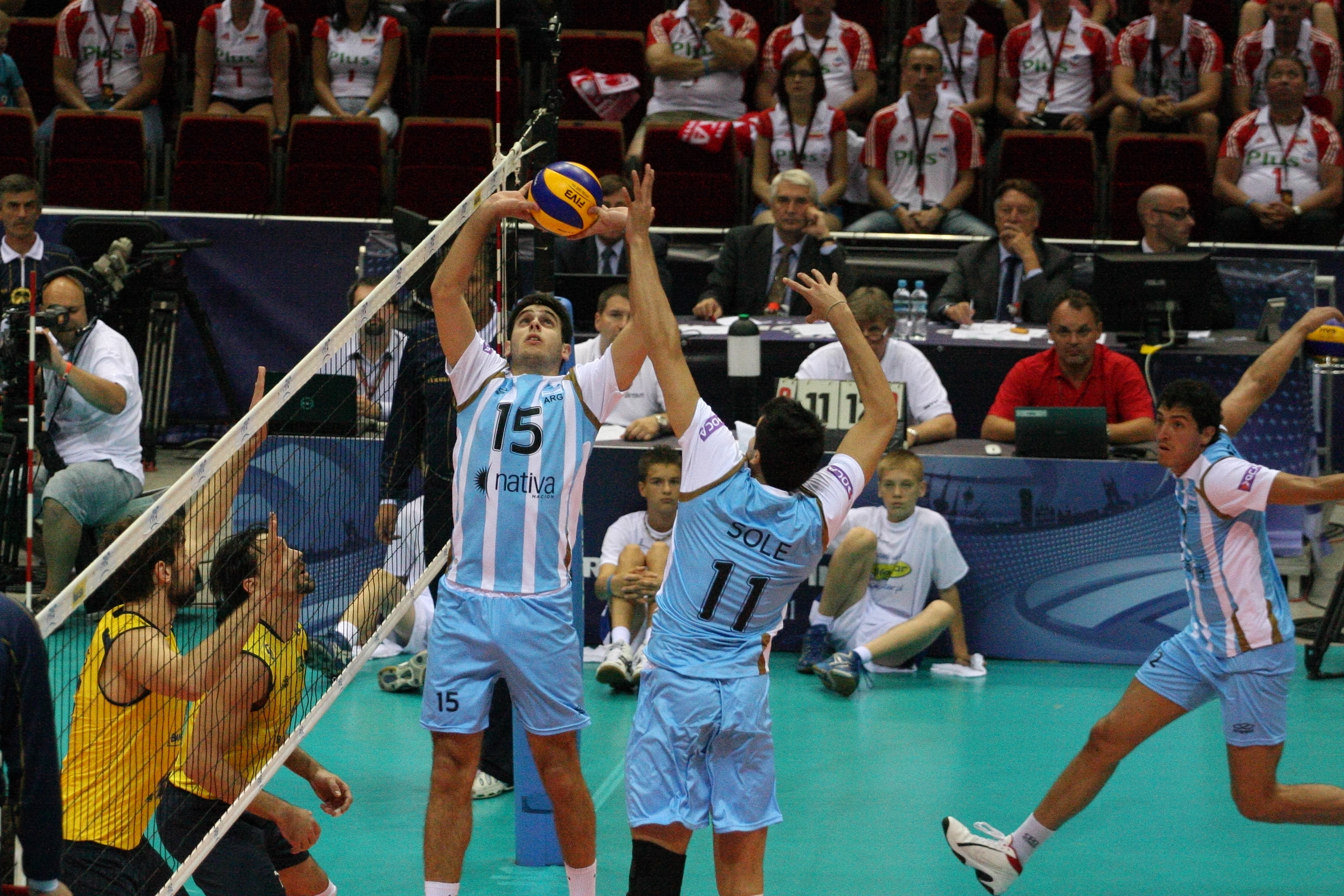
Argentina against Brazil, 2011 World League semifinals

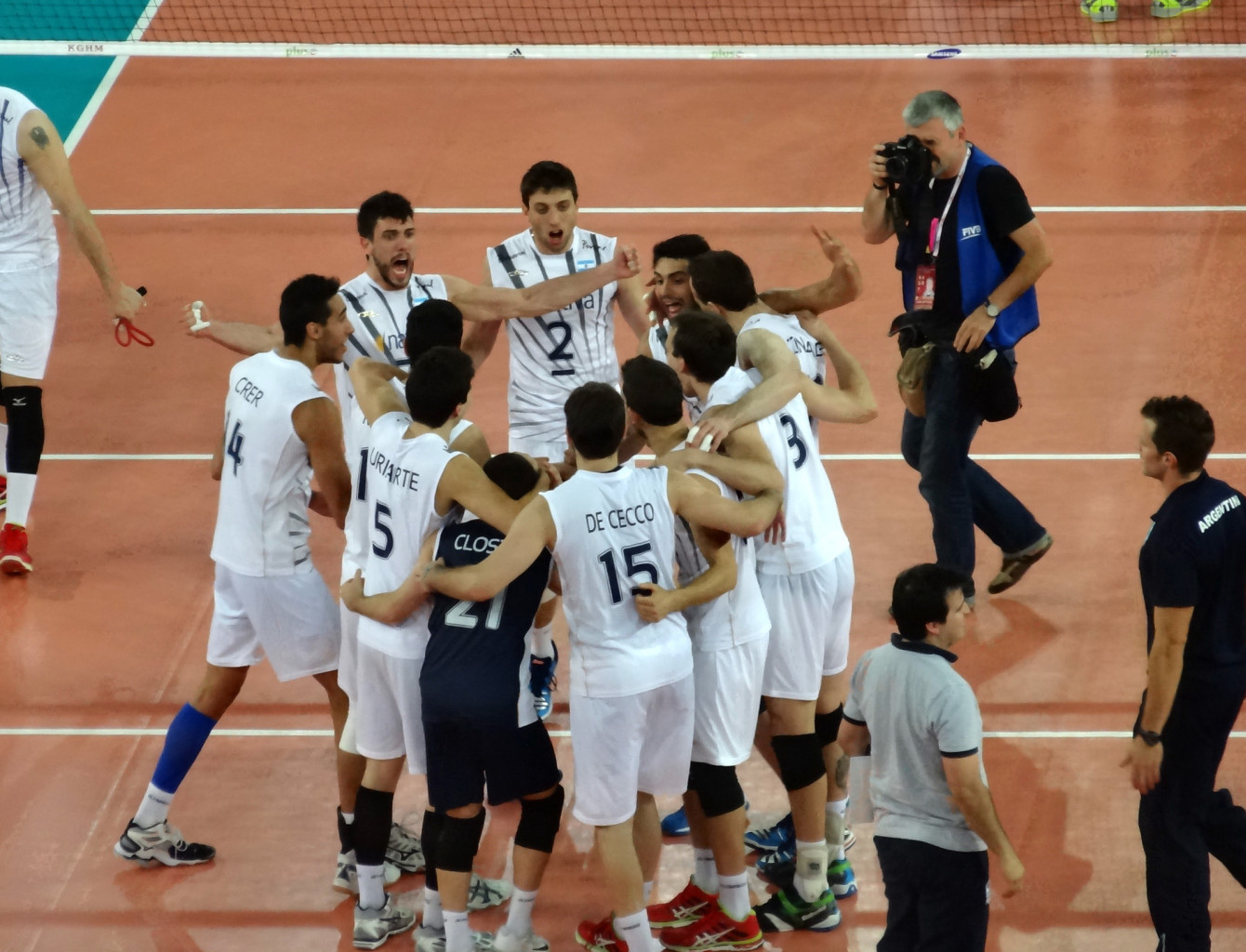
Argentina against USA at the 2014 World Championship

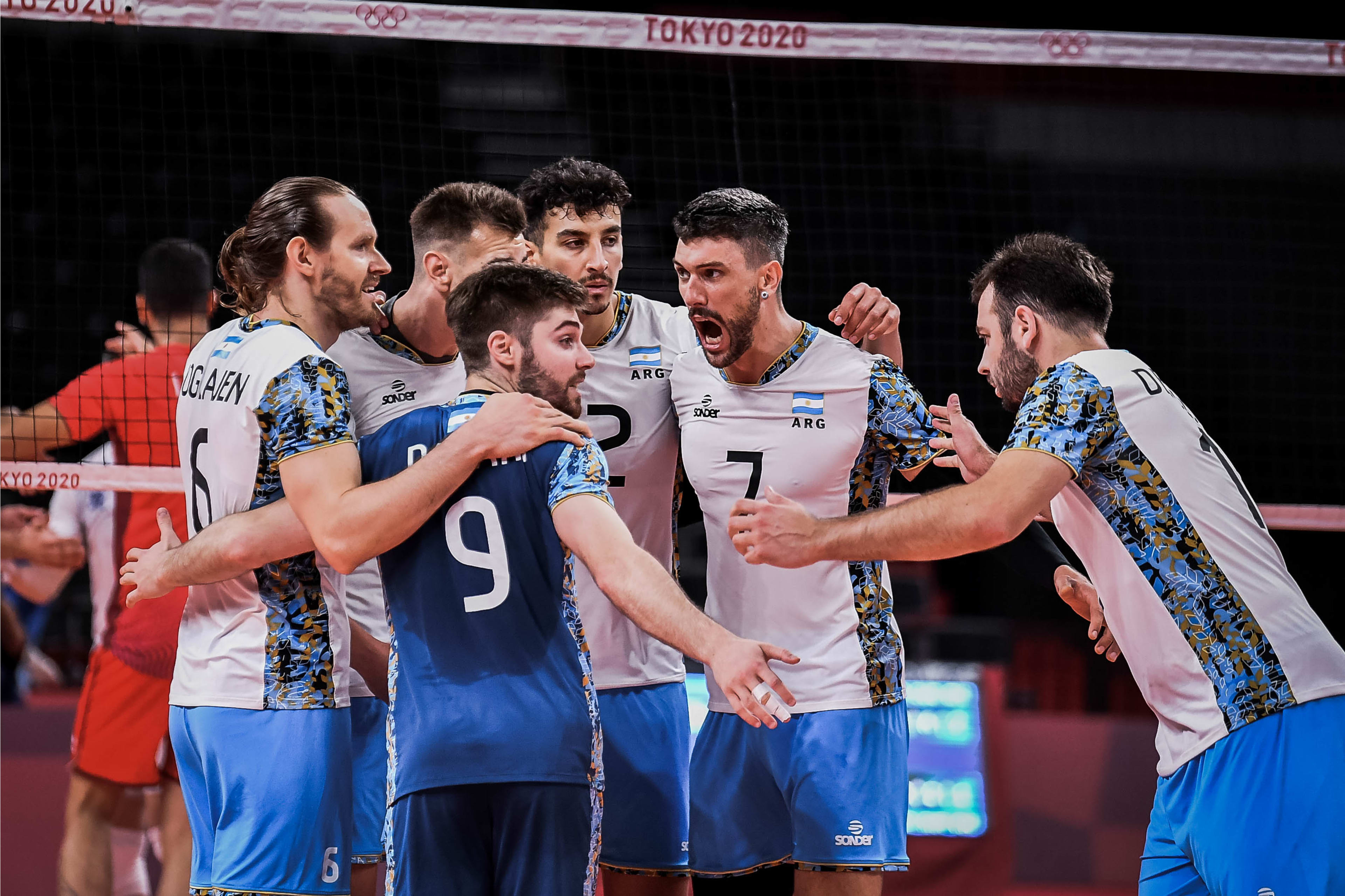
Argentina against France at the 2020 Summer Olympics

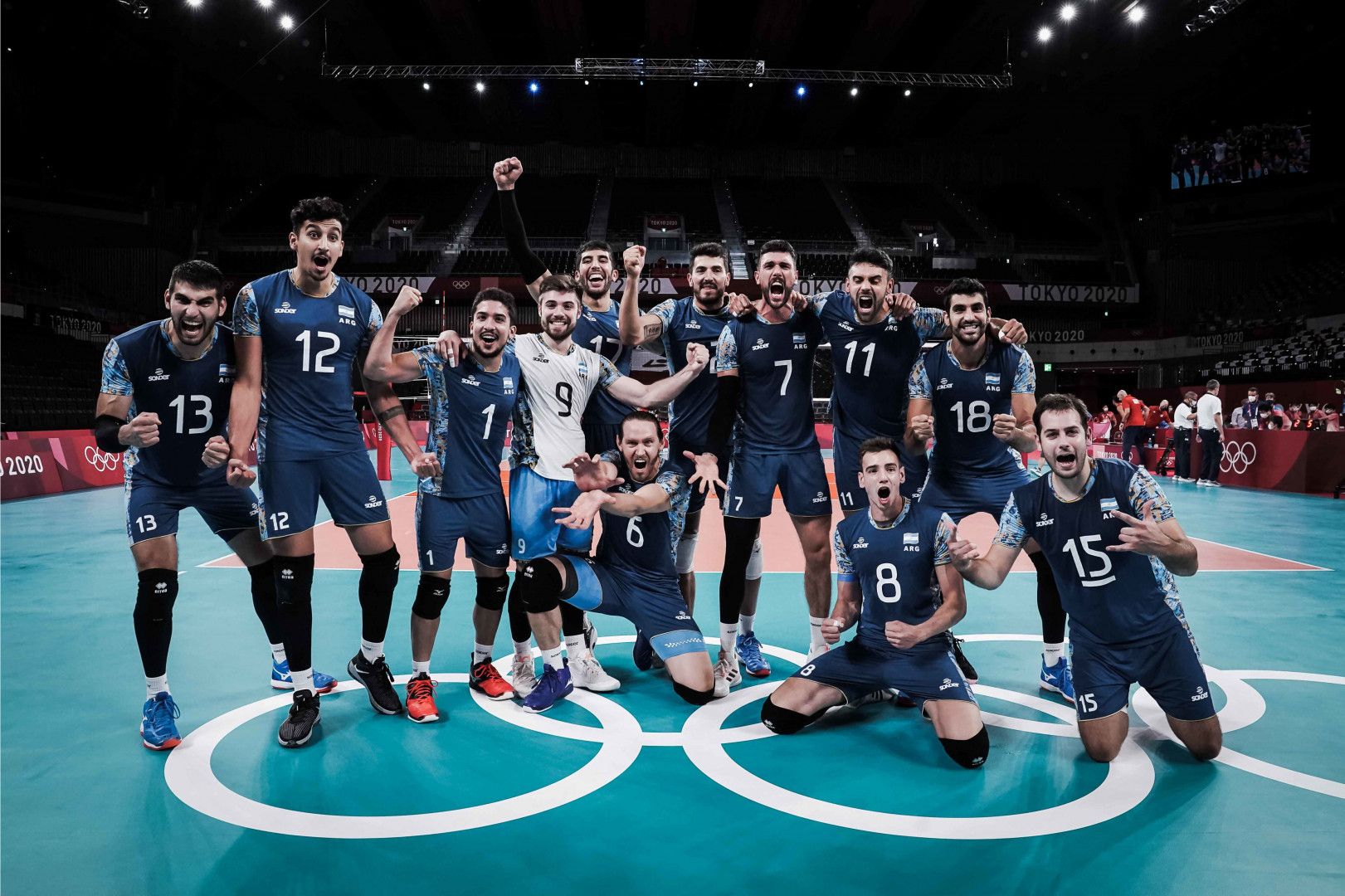
Team Argentina at the 2020 Summer Olympics

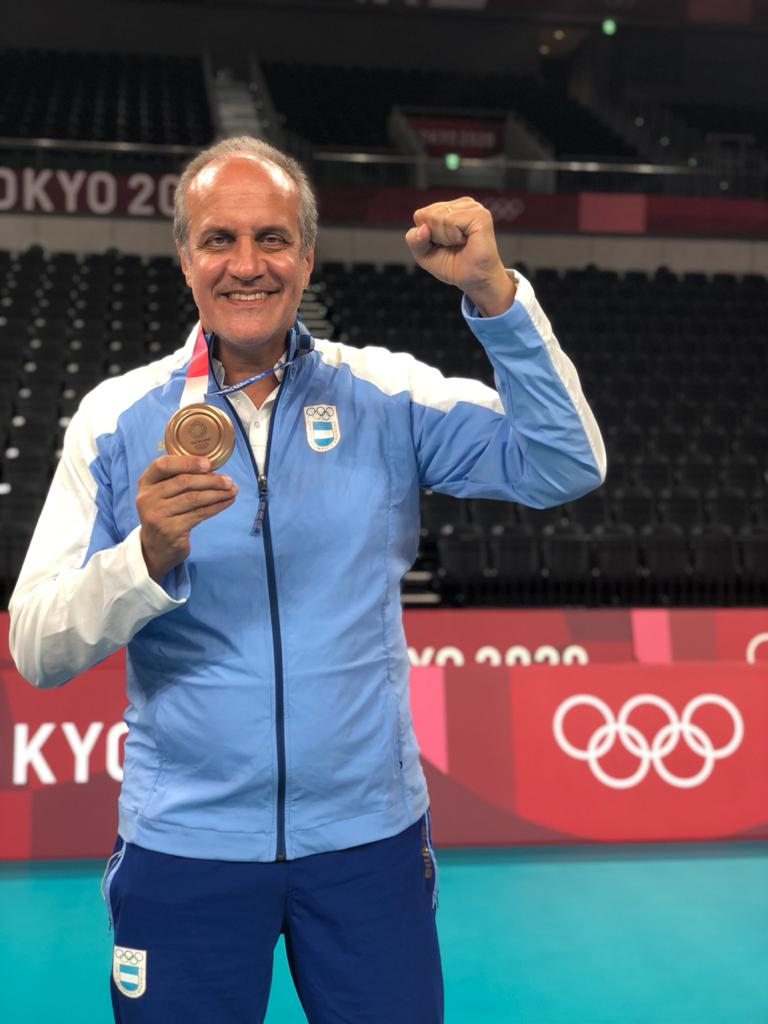
Head Coach Marcelo Méndez with bronze medal at the 2020 Summer Olympics

== Kit providers ==
The table below shows the history of kit providers for the Argentina national volleyball team.

Period	Kit provider
2000–2006	Topper
2008–2021	Olympikus; Sonder
2022–	Le Coq Sportif

=== Sponsorship ===
Main sponsors:

- Banco de la Nación Argentina
- Sonder

Other sponsors:

- Pensma
- Sodimac
- Arnet
- Enardo
- Gatorade

== See also ==
- Argentina women's national volleyball team
- Argentina men's national under-23 volleyball team
- Argentina men's national under-21 volleyball team
- Argentina men's national under-19 volleyball team
