= 2005 Volleyball America's Cup squads =

This article shows all participating team squads at the 2005 Volleyball America's Cup, between August 3 and August 7 in the town of São Leopoldo, Rio Grande do Sul, Brazil.

== Argentina ==
- Head coach: Fabián Armoa

#	Name	Date of birth	Height	Weight	Spike	Block
3	Gustavo Porporatto	07.05.1981	199	91	353	323
7	Ignacio Bernasconi	19.09.1985	195	80	330	310
8	Hernan Ferraro	13.05.1968	170	74	300	300
10	Alejandro Spajic	07.05.1976	204	95	360	340
12	Alexis González	21.07.1981	182	70	321	300
13	Santiago Darraidou	24.11.1980	194	95	345	335
14	Javier Filardi	07.02.1980	191	90	345	315
15	Leonardo Patti	06.07.1978	188	88	340	320
18	Gaston Giani	26.04.1979	194	86	345	330

== Brazil ==
- Head coach: Bernardo Rezende

#	Name	Date of birth	Height	Weight	Spike	Block
2	Marcelinho	09.11.1974	183	78	321	308
4	André Heller	17.12.1975	199	93	339	321
7	Gilberto Godoy Filho	23.12.1976	192	85	325	312
8	Murilo Endres	03.05.1981	190	76	343	319
9	André Nascimento	04.03.1979	195	95	340	320
10	Sérgio Dutra Santos	15.10.1975	184	78	325	310
11	Anderson Rodrigues	21.05.1974	190	95	330	321
12	Samuel Fuchs	04.03.1984	200	89	342	316
13	Gustavo Endres	23.08.1975	203	98	337	325
14	Rodrigo Santana	17.04.1979	205	85	350	328
17	Ricardo Garcia	19.11.1975	191	89	337	320
18	Dante Amaral	30.09.1980	201	86	345	327

== Canada ==
- Head coach: Stelio de Rocco

#	Name	Date of birth	Height	Weight	Spike	Block
3	Michael Munday	14.10.1990	193	84	345	325
4	Pascal Cardinal	24.05.1979	198	93	354	322
5	Lucas Snider	06.08.1977	183	93	334	319
7	Dallas Soonias	25.04.1984	200	91	356	323
8	Scott Koskie	14.12.1971	190	85	330	312
9	Paul Duerden	22.10.1974	195	96	358	320
10	Brett Youngberg	15.09.1979	204	97	357	333
12	Chris Wolfenden	22.06.1977	194	88	298	282
11	Steve Brinkman	12.01.1978	202	92	352	320
14	Murray Grapentine	24.08.1977	202	98	359	327
15	Fred Winters	25.09.1982	198	85	359	327

== Cuba ==
- Head coach: Roberto García

#	Name	Date of birth	Height	Weight	Spike	Block
1	Raidel Poey	20.02.1982	198	82	360	340
2	Tomás Aldazabal	30.05.1976	193	83	360	340
5	Osmany Juantorena	12.08.1985	190	78	350	330
7	Osmany Camejo	18.02.1983	202	90	350	330
8	Pavel Pimienta	03.08.1976	204	96	365	340
12	Henry Bell Cisnero	27.07.1983	188	84	358	328
13	Robertlandy Simón	11.06.1987	206	91	358	326
14	Raydel Corrales	15.02.1982	201	94	355	325
15	Oriol Camejo	22.07.1986	207	94	354	326
16	Sirianis Méndez	14.03.1983	193	81	350	320
17	Odelvis Dominico	06.05.1977	205	87	360	356
18	Yoandri Díaz	04.01.1985	196	89	358	328

== United States ==
- Head coach: Hugh McCutcheon

#	Name	Date of birth	Height	Weight	Spike	Block
1	David Lee	08.03.1982	203	105	350	325
2	Kyle Robinson
3	James Polster	08.02.1979	198	100	352	333
5	Richard Lambourne	06.05.1975	190	90	324	312
6	Phillip Eatherton	02.01.1974	206	101	356	335
7	Donald Suxho
9	Chris Seiffert
10	Riley Salmon	02.07.1976	197	89	345	331
11	Pieter Olree
12	Thomas Hoff	09.06.1973	198	94	353	333
15	Curt Toppel
16	David McKienzie	05.07.1979	193	95	358	340

== Venezuela ==
- Head coach: Argimiro Méndez

#	Name	Date of birth	Height	Weight	Spike	Block
2	Deivi Yustiz	15.06.1985	198	76	354	345
3	Andy Rojas	02.10.1977	197	95	315	318
4	Gustavo Valderrama	31.07.1977	192	80	323	323
5	Rodman Valera	20.04.1982	188	82	337	332
6	Carlos Luna	25.01.1981	194	85	339	331
7	Luis Díaz	20.08.1983	204	92	349	342
8	Andrés Manzanillo	01.08.1977	197	80	334	334
11	Ernardo Gómez	30.07.1982	195	90	355	350
12	Carlos Tejeda	29.07.1980	198	90	340	315
13	Iván Márquez	04.10.1981	205	85	339	333
17	Juan Carlos Blanco	27.07.1981	195	83	341	336
18	Fredy Cedeño	10.09.1981	205	95	353	348
