= Volleyball at the 2007 Pan American Games – Men's team rosters =

This article show all participating men's team squads at the 2007 Pan American Games, played by eight countries held in Rio de Janeiro, Brazil.

== Argentina ==
- Head coach: Jon Uriarte

| # | Name | Date of birth | Weight | Height | Spike | Block |
|---|---|---|---|---|---|---|
| 1 | Marcos Milinkovic (c) | 22.12.1971 | 99 | 205 | 355 | 338 |
| 2 | Gustavo Scholtis | 16.12.1982 | 85 | 206 | 349 | 332 |
| 3 | Diego Stepanenko | 25.02.1985 | 90 | 204 | 349 | 337 |
| 4 | Luciano De Cecco | 02.06.1988 | 84 | 194 | 333 | 315 |
| 7 | Ignacio Bernasconi | 19.09.1985 | 75 | 195 | 335 | 323 |
| 8 | Leandro Concina | 04.11.1984 | 94 | 195 | 345 | 325 |
| 9 | Lucas Chávez | 03.04.1982 | 88 | 200 | 348 | 328 |
| 10 | Rodrigo Aschemacher | 06.03.1989 | 91 | 202 | 343 | 327 |
| 11 | Franco Giachetta | 28.03.1987 | 93 | 202 | 342 | 323 |
| 12 | Martín Meana | 26.04.1982 | 83 | 188 | 347 | 320 |
| 14 | Lucas Ocampo | 20.03.1986 | 100 | 196 | 335 | 318 |
| 18 | Gastón Giani | 26.04.1979 | 86 | 194 | 345 | 330 |

== Brazil ==
- Head coach: Bernardo Rezende

| # | Name | Date of birth | Weight | Height | Spike | Block |
|---|---|---|---|---|---|---|
| 1 | Bruno Rezende | 02.07.1986 | 76 | 190 | 323 | 302 |
| 2 | Marcelo Elgarten |
| 4 | Andre Heller |
| 6 | Samuel Fuchs | 04.03.1984 | 89 | 200 | 342 | 316 |
| 7 | Gilberto Godoy (c) |
| 8 | Murilo Endres | 03.05.1981 | 76 | 190 | 343 | 319 |
| 9 | Andre Nascimento |
| 10 | Sérgio Dutra Santos |
| 11 | Anderson Rodrigues |
| 13 | Gustavo Endres |
| 14 | Rodrigo Santana |
| 18 | Dante Amaral |

== Canada ==
- Head coach: Glenn Hoag

| # | Name | Date of birth | Weight | Height | Spike | Block |
|---|---|---|---|---|---|---|
| 2 | Christian Bernier | 20.11.1981 | 91 | 192 | 341 | 318 |
| 3 | Daniel Lewis | 03.04.1976 | 92 | 193 | 349 | 325 |
| 5 | Michael Munday | 14.11.1980 | 91 | 205 | 305 | 286 |
| 6 | Jeremy Wilcox | 22.02.1979 | 82 | 188 | 353 | 314 |
| 7 | Dallas Soonias | 25.04.1984 | 91 | 200 | 356 | 323 |
| 9 | Paul Duerden | 22.10.1974 | 98 | 196 | 358 | 320 |
| 10 | Brett Youngberg | 15.09.1979 | 97 | 204 | 357 | 333 |
| 12 | Chris Wolfenden | 22.06.1977 | 89 | 194 | 341 | 321 |
| 14 | Murray Grapentine (c) | 24.08.1977 | 98 | 202 | 359 | 334 |
| 15 | Frederic Winters | 25.09.1982 | 95 | 198 | 359 | 327 |
| 16 | Leo Carroll | 06.07.1983 | 106 | 204 | 354 | 326 |
| 18 | Nicholas Cundy | 14.09.1983 | 83 | 194 | 350 | 325 |

== Cuba ==
- Head coach: Orlando Samuel

| # | Name | Date of birth | Weight | Height | Spike | Block |
|---|---|---|---|---|---|---|
| 3 | Jorge Sánchez Salgado | 23.03.1985 | 81 | 197 | 345 | 313 |
| 6 | Tornakeibel Gutiérrez | 06.05.1987 | 80 | 178 | 305 | 295 |
| 8 | Pavel Pimienta (c) | 02.08.1975 | 96 | 204 | 365 | 340 |
| 9 | Michael Sánchez | 05.06.1986 | 91 | 206 | 358 | 328 |
| 10 | Rolando Jurquin | 07.06.1987 | 86 | 200 | 341 | 328 |
| 12 | Pedro Iznaga | 11.08.1986 | 87 | 195 | 340 | 333 |
| 13 | Robertlandy Simón | 11.06.1987 | 91 | 206 | 358 | 326 |
| 14 | Raydel Hierrezuelo | 14.07.1987 | 87 | 196 | 340 | 335 |
| 15 | Oriol Camejo | 22.07.1986 | 94 | 207 | 354 | 326 |
| 16 | Raydel Corrales | 15.02.1982 | 94 | 201 | 355 | 325 |
| 17 | Odelvis Dominico | 06.05.1977 | 87 | 205 | 360 | 356 |
| 18 | Yoandri Díaz | 04.01.1985 | 89 | 196 | 358 | 328 |

== Mexico ==
- Head coach: Jorge Azair

| # | Name | Date of birth | Weight | Height | Spike | Block |
|---|---|---|---|---|---|---|
| 1 | Mario Becerra | 18.05.1978 | 86 | 192 | 330 | 320 |
| 3 | David Alva |
| 4 | Gustavo Meyer |
| 5 | Pedro Rangel |
| 6 | Irving Bricio |
| 7 | Iván Contreras | 29.01.1974 | 87 | 198 | 345 | 335 |
| 8 | Ignacio Ramírez |
| 11 | Juan García (c) |
| 12 | José Luis Martell |
| 14 | Tomás Aguilera | 15.11.1988 | 85 | 202 | 336 | 328 |
| 17 | Raymundo Valdez |
| 18 | Fabián Leal | 30.04.1985 | 78 | 186 | 331 | 325 |

== Puerto Rico ==
- Head coach: Luis Ruiz

| # | Name | Date of birth | Weight | Height | Spike | Block |
|---|---|---|---|---|---|---|
| 1 | José Rivera | 02.07.1977 | 85 | 192 | 325 | 320 |
| 2 | Gregory Berrios | 24.01.1979 | 83 | 182 | 305 | 299 |
| 4 | Víctor Rivera | 30.08.1976 | 88 | 195 | 345 | 329 |
| 6 | Ángel Pérez | 20.05.1982 | 86 | 190 | 325 | 318 |
| 8 | Iván Pérez |
| 9 | Luis Rodríguez | 13.07.1969 | 89 | 202 | 340 | 333 |
| 10 | Víctor Bird | 16.03.1982 | 90 | 195 | 335 | 328 |
| 11 | Roberto Muñoz | 11.06.1980 | 92 | 194 | 333 | 326 |
| 12 | Héctor Soto (c) | 20.06.1978 | 85 | 197 | 340 | 332 |
| 13 | Alexis Matias | 21.07.1974 | 88 | 195 | 335 | 325 |
| 14 | Fernando Morales | 04.02.1982 | 68 | 186 | 299 | 292 |
| 16 | Enrique Escalante | 06.08.1984 | 88 | 195 | 330 | 324 |

== United States ==
- Head coach: Hugh McCutcheon

| # | Name | Date of birth | Weight | Height | Spike | Block |
|---|---|---|---|---|---|---|
| 1 | David Lee | 08.03.1982 | 105 | 203 | 350 | 325 |
| 2 | Sean Rooney | 13.11.1982 | 100 | 206 | 354 | 336 |
| 3 | James Polster (c) | 08.02.1979 | 100 | 198 | 352 | 333 |
| 4 | Brandon Taliaferro | 28.09.1977 | 113 | 175 |
| 5 | Richard Lambourne | 06.05.1975 | 90 | 190 | 324 | 312 |
| 9 | Andrew Hein | 01.07.1984 | 105 | 208 |
| 11 | Brook Billings | 30.04.1980 | 95 | 196 | 351 | 331 |
| 12 | Olree Pieter |
| 14 | Kevin Hansen | 19.03.1982 | 93 | 196 | 349 | 330 |
| 16 | David McKienzie | 05.07.1979 | 95 | 193 |
| 17 | Delano Thomas | 26.01.1983 | 95 | 202 | 368 | 340 |
| 18 | Nils Nielsen |

== Venezuela ==
- Head coach: Ricardo Navajas

| # | Name | Date of birth | Height | Weight | Spike | Block |
|---|---|---|---|---|---|---|
| 1 | Pedro Siso |
| 2 | Deivi Yustiz |
| 5 | Rodman Valera | 20.04.1982 | 188 | 82 | 337 | 332 |
| 6 | Carlos Luna | 25.01.1981 | 194 | 85 | 339 | 331 |
| 7 | Luis Díaz | 20.08.1983 | 204 | 92 | 349 | 342 |
| 11 | Ernardo Gómez | 30.07.1982 | 195 | 85 | 355 | 350 |
| 12 | Carlos Tejeda | 28.07.1980 | 198 | 90 | 340 | 315 |
| 13 | Iván Márquez | 04.10.1981 | 205 | 85 | 339 | 333 |
| 14 | Thomas Ereu (c) | 25.10.1979 | 193 | 85 | 338 | 330 |
| 16 | Jorge Silva |
| 17 | Juan Carlos Blanco | 27.07.1981 | 195 | 83 | 341 | 336 |
| 18 | Fredy Cedeño | 10.09.1981 | 202 | 90 | 353 | 348 |

== See also ==
- Volleyball at the 2007 Pan American Games – Women's team rosters
