= Peru men's national volleyball team =

National sports team

Peru
- Association: Peruvian Volleyball Federation (FPV)
- Confederation: CSV
- Head coach: Albert Maduro
- FIVB ranking: 105 ▲15 (1 October 2026)

Uniforms
Home	Away

World Championship
- Appearances: 1 (First in 1960)
- Best result: 14th (1960)

South American Championship
- Appearances: 21 (First in 1951)
- Best result: (1951)
- fpv.org.pe (in Spanish)
Honours
South American Championship
Bronze medal – third place	1951 Rio de Janeiro	Team

The Peru men's national volleyball team is the national team of Peru. The squad won the bronze medal at the inaugural 1951 South American Championship in Rio de Janeiro, Brazil. Peru women is one of the dominant forces in the continent, however the dominant forces in men's volleyball on the South American continent are Brazil and Argentina.

== Competition record ==
=== World Championship ===
- (Brazil) 1960 — 14th place

=== South American Championship ===
- 1951 — (bronze) Bronze Medal
- 1956 — 4th place
- 1958 — did not compete
- 1961 — 4th place
- 1962 — 7th place
- 1964 — did not compete
- 1967 — did not compete
- 1969 — did not compete
- 1971 — 6th place
- 1973 — did not compete
- 1975 — did not compete
- 1977 — 4th place
- 1979 — 6th place
- 1981 — did not compete
- 1983 — did not compete
- 1985 — 6th place
- 1987 — 7th place
- 1989 — 4th place
- 1991 — 4th place
- 1993 — did not compete
- 1995 — 6th place
- 1997 — 4th place
- 1999 — 8th place
- 2001 — did not compete
- 2003 — did not compete
- 2005 — did not compete
- 2007 — 8th place
- 2009 — 6th place
- 2011 — did not compete
- 2013 — did not compete
- 2015 — 7th place
- 2017 — 7th place
- 2019 — 5th place
- 2021 — 5th place
- 2023 — 5th place

=== Copa América ===
- (Brazil) 2025 — 5th place
