= Volleyball at the 2005 Bolivarian Games – Men's team rosters =

This article shows all participating men's volleyball squads at the 2005 Bolivarian Games, held from August 13 to 18, 2005 in Pereira, Colombia.

== Bolivia ==
- Head Coach: Raúl David García

#	Name	Date of birth	Weight	Height	Spike	Block
2	Rodrigo Zelada	02.01.1988	68	185
3	Carlos Julio Languidey	20.09.1986	90	189
5	Rolando Ismael	30.10.1986	82	193
6	René Fernando Barrientos	30.12.1973	75	171
7	Cristian Rodolfo Lazarte	03.06.1984	73	182
8	Dorian Ovidio Guachalla (c)	20.07.1977	81	186
9	Armin Zubieta	05.07.1985	73	182
10	Iván Franco Meruvia	25.12.1985	75	191
11	Edson Pérez	01.08.1980	69	180
12	Daniel Calvo	17.07.1980	83	185

== Colombia ==
- Head Coach: José A. Rojas

#	Name	Date of birth	Weight	Height	Spike	Block
1	Nelson Jeferson Romero	21.09.1983	100	196
2	Emerson Isajar Díaz	28.12.1982	83	195
5	Sergio Gaitán Bolaños	01.09.1984	92	196
6	Jorge González Obregón	22.05.1982	96	197
7	Liberman Agamez Urango	15.02.1985	95	207
8	Carlos Pinillo Quintero	21.08.1979	86	193
9	Alexander Moreno Quejada	23.04.1981	90	201
10	Roberto Alejandro Olarte (c)	29.04.1981	82	184
11	Johan Estrada Campillo	20.11.1981	92	200
12	Jaime Andrés Viafara	18.03.1981	98	202
13	Fredison Mosquera	10.09.1981	100	199
15	Jorge Orlando Olarte	14.03.1979	105	197

== Ecuador ==
- Head Coach:

#	Name	Date of birth	Weight	Height	Spike	Block
3	Mario Yáñez	06.06.1982	82	191
4	Roberto Vilela	21.02.1985	68	182
5	Luis Sánchez	21.04.1985	82	175
6	Israel Vera	16.06.1979	80	185
7	Juan Carlos Pinzón	04.03.1981	78	183
8	Víctor Weir (c)	19.02.1975	87	186
9	Manuel Macías	09.10.1985	75	174
10	Miguel Valencia	23.10.1985	76	184
11	Richard Santos	21.02.1986	67	196
12	Daniel Maldonado	10.07.1987	78	183

== Venezuela ==
- Head coach: Argemiro Méndez

#	Name	Date of birth	Height	Weight	Spike	Block
2	Deivi Yustiz	15.06.1985	198	76	354	345
3	Andy Rojas	02.10.1977	197	95	315	318
4	Gustavo Valderrama	31.07.1977	192	80	323	323
5	Rodman Valera	20.04.1982	188	82	337	332
6	Carlos Luna	25.01.1981	194	85	339	331
7	Luis Díaz	20.08.1983	204	92	349	342
8	Andrés Manzanillo	01.08.1977	197	80	334	334
11	Ernardo Gómez (c)	30.07.1982	195	90	355	350
12	Carlos Tejeda	29.07.1980	198	90	340	315
13	Iván Márquez	04.10.1981	205	85	339	333
14	Juan Carlos Blanco	27.07.1981	195	83	341	336
18	Fredy Cedeño	10.09.1981	205	95	353	348
