= Daniel Castellani =

Argentine volleyball player (1961–2026)

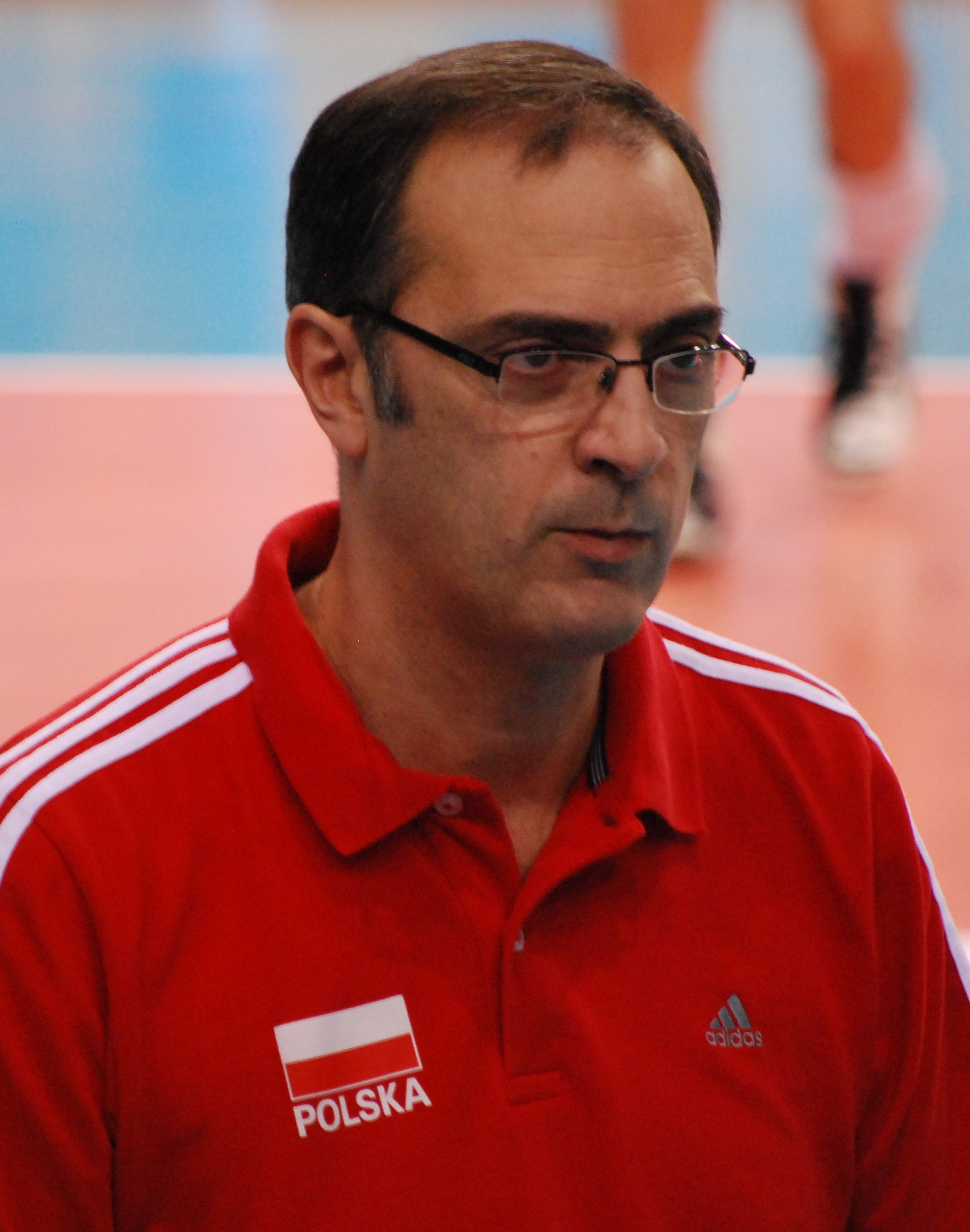
- Castellani in 2010

Personal information
- Full name: Daniel Jorge Castellani
- Born: 21 March 1961; La Lucila, Buenos Aires Province, Argentina
- Died: 25 June 2026 (aged 65)
- Height: 1.95 m (6 ft 5 in)

Coaching information
Previous teams coached
Years	Teams
1993–1999; 2001–2002; 2002–2006; 2006–2009; 2009–2010; 2011–2012; 2011–2012; 2012–2013; 2013–2015; 2015; 2016–2017; 2017–2019; 2020–2021; 2021–2023; 2022–2024; 2023–2024	Argentina; Telephonica Volley Gioia; Bolívar Voley; Skra Bełchatów; Poland; Finland; Fenerbahçe; ZAKSA Kędzierzyn-Koźle; Fenerbahçe; Sir Safety Perugia; Noliko Maaseik; Vôlei Taubaté; AZS Olsztyn; Fenerbahçe; Argentina (W); Olympiacos

Volleyball information
- Position: Outside hitter

Career
Years	Teams
1976–1982; 1982–1983; 1983–1984; 1984–1985; 1985–1986; 1986–1987; 1987–1988; 1988–1991; 1991–1993	Obras Sanitarias; Minas Tênis Clube; Pallavolo Chieti; Bradesco Atlântica; Pallavolo Falconara; VB San Nicolás; Zinella Volley; Pallavolo Padova; Volley Prato

National team
1976–1988	Argentina
Honours
Men's volleyball
Representing Argentina
Olympic Games
Bronze medal – third place	1988 Seoul
FIVB World Championship
Bronze medal – third place	1982 Argentina
Pan American Games
Bronze medal – third place	1983 Caracas
CSV South American Championship
Silver medal – second place	1981 Chile
Silver medal – second place	1983 Brazil
Silver medal – second place	1987 Uruguay
Bronze medal – third place	1979 Argentina
Head coach Argentina
CSV South American Championship
Silver medal – second place	1993 Argentina
Silver medal – second place	1995 Brazil
Silver medal – second place	1999 Argentina
Bronze medal – third place	1997 Venezuela
Head coach Poland
CEV European Championship
Gold medal – first place	2009 Turkey

Daniel Jorge Castellani (Italian: [kastelˈlaːni]; 21 March 1961 – 25 June 2026) was an Argentine professional volleyball coach and player. He was a member of the Argentina national team from 1976 to 1988, and a bronze medallist at the Olympic Games Seoul 1988 and the 1982 World Championship.

== Background ==
Castellani was born in Buenos Aires on 21 March 1961. He was married to Silvina Pozzo. They had two children – a daughter named Ariana and a son Iván, who was also a volleyball player, playing as an opposite spiker in the Argentina national team.

Castellani died on 25 June 2026, at the age of 65.

== Career ==
=== As a coach ===
Castellani was a head coach of Skra Bełchatów in 2006–2009. In 2009, he took charge of the Polish national team, and in September 2009 led the team to the European Champions title. On 14 September 2009, he was awarded the Knight's Cross of Polonia Restituta. The Order was conferred on the following day by the Prime Minister of Poland, Donald Tusk. He was dismissed before the end of his contract after an unsatisfactory result at the 2010 World Championship held in Italy.

In 2012, he was appointed new head coach of the PlusLiga team, ZAKSA Kędzierzyn-Koźle.

In May 2015, he started his work in Sir Safety Perugia.

In May 2017, after one season spent in Noliko Maaseik, he moved to Funvic Taubaté. Castellani was dismissed from his post in 2019, and replaced by Renan Dal Zotto.

For the 2023–24 season, Castellani was appointed new head coach of Olympiacos.

== Honours ==
=== As a player ===
- CEV Cup
  - 1987–88 – with Camst Bologna
- CEV Challenge Cup
  - 1985–86 – with Kutiba Falconara
  - 1988–89 – with Petrarca Padova
- Youth national team
  - 1980 CSV U21 South American Championship

=== As a coach ===
- CEV Challenge Cup
  - 2013–14 – with Fenerbahçe
- Domestic
  - 2002–03 Argentine Championship, with Bolívar Voley
  - 2003–04 Argentine Championship, with Bolívar Voley
  - 2006–07 Polish Cup, with BOT Skra Bełchatów
  - 2006–07 Polish Championship, with BOT Skra Bełchatów
  - 2007–08 Polish Cup, with PGE Skra Bełchatów
  - 2007–08 Polish Championship, with PGE Skra Bełchatów
  - 2008–09 Polish Cup, with PGE Skra Bełchatów
  - 2008–09 Polish Championship, with PGE Skra Bełchatów
  - 2011–12 Turkish SuperCup, with Fenerbahçe
  - 2011–12 Turkish Cup, with Fenerbahçe
  - 2010–11 Turkish Championship, with Fenerbahçe
  - 2011–12 Turkish Championship, with Fenerbahçe
  - 2012–13 Polish Cup, with ZAKSA Kędzierzyn-Koźle
  - 2016–17 Belgian SuperCup, with Noliko Maaseik
  - 2023–24 Greek Cup, with Olympiacos
  - 2023–24 Greek Championship, with Olympiacos

=== State awards ===
- 2009: Officer's Cross of Polonia Restituta

Sporting positions
Preceded by (Argentina) Raúl Lozano	Head coach of Poland; 2009–2010	Succeeded by (Italy) Andrea Anastasi
