= Giovane Gávio =

Brazilian volleyball player and coach

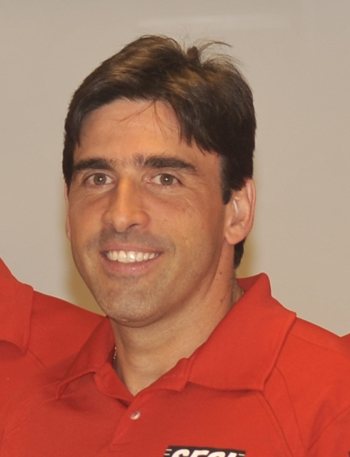

Personal information
- Full name: Giovane Farinazzo Gavio
- Born: 7 September 1970 (age 56); Juiz de Fora, Brazil
- Height: 1.96 m (6 ft 5 in)
- Weight: 86 kg (190 lb)
- Spike: 340 cm (134 in)
- Block: 322 cm (127 in)

Volleyball information
- Position: Outside hitter
- Number: 3

National team
1989–2004	Brazil
Honours
Men's volleyball
Representing Brazil
Event	1st	2nd	3rd
Olympic Games	2	0	0
World Championship	1	0	0
World Cup	1	0	1
World Grand Champions Cup	1	2	0
World League	4	2	4
Pan American Games	0	2	1
South American Championship	8	0	0
Total	17	6	6
Olympic Games
Gold medal – first place	1992 Barcelona	Team
Gold medal – first place	2004 Athens	Team
World Championship
Gold medal – first place	2002 Argentina	Team
World Cup
Gold medal – first place	2003 Japan	Team
Bronze medal – third place	1995 Japan	Team
World Grand Champions Cup
Gold medal – first place	1997 Japan	Team
Silver medal – second place	1993 Japan	Team
Silver medal – second place	2001 Japan	Team
World League
Gold medal – first place	1993 São Paulo	
Gold medal – first place	2001 Katowice	
Gold medal – first place	2003 Madrid	
Gold medal – first place	2004 Rome	Team
Silver medal – second place	1995 Rio de Janeiro	
Silver medal – second place	2002 Belo Horizonte	
Bronze medal – third place	1990 Osaka	
Bronze medal – third place	1994 Milan	
Bronze medal – third place	1999 Mar del Plata	
Bronze medal – third place	2000 Rotterdam	
Pan American Games
Silver medal – second place	1991 Havana	Team
Silver medal – second place	1999 Winnipeg	Team
Bronze medal – third place	2003 Santo Domingo	Team
South American Championship
Gold medal – first place	1989 Brazil	
Gold medal – first place	1991 Brazil	
Gold medal – first place	1993 Argentina	
Gold medal – first place	1995 Brazil	
Gold medal – first place	1997 Venezuela	
Gold medal – first place	1999 Argentina	
Gold medal – first place	2001 Colombia	
Gold medal – first place	2003 Brazil	

Giovane Farinazzo Gavio (born 7 September 1970), known as Giovane, is a Brazilian retired volleyball coach and former player who was a member of the Brazil men's national volleyball team that won the gold medal at the 1992 Summer Olympics in Barcelona by defeating the Netherlands (3-0) in the final.

Playing as an outside hitter, Gavio competed in three consecutive Summer Olympics, starting in 1992. Later on he started a career in beach volleyball. He is the only Brazilian player (and second overall, after Javier Weber) to win the Superliga both as player and coach. After retiring from coaching national and club teams, Gavio became a sports executive, businessman and corporate speaker, and is the founder of the Instituto Giovane Gávio.

In 2021, Gavio was inducted into the International Volleyball Hall of Fame.

== Coaching career ==
Gavio retired as a player in 2005 and began coaching in 2009 at SESI São Paulo, where he won two São Paulo Cups (2009 and 2010), two São Paulo state championships (2009 and 2012), and the Superliga title in the 2010–11 season. He subsequently coached SESC-RJ from 2016 to 2020, winning the Rio de Janeiro state championship in 2016 and the Superliga B title in 2017. He also served as head coach of the Brazilian under-21 (2016; 2019–2021) and under-23 (2017–2018) national teams, winning the 2022 South American Under-21 Championship.

== Sports management ==
In July 2022, Gavio launched a project to revive professional men's volleyball in Joinville, Santa Catarina, becoming president of the Associação de Vôlei Norte Catarinense, known as Joinville Vôlei. The club reached Superliga B in its first season and was promoted to Superliga A for 2023–24. Under his presidency, the club also runs Novos Ventos, a social project using mini-volleyball to reach children and teenagers aged 8 to 15 from public schools in Joinville, launched in February 2024 and expanded to Itapoá in 2025.

Gavio is also the founder of the Instituto Giovane Gávio, a non-profit organisation established in April 2000 that uses sport as a tool for education and social inclusion; he is no longer its executive president, a role held by another leader since 2024. The institute supports the Vôlei do Futuro project, with free volleyball classes for children in Rio de Janeiro and Vitória, and, in Brasília, the Vôlei BSB TEC project, which combines a men's youth team with professional and technology training.

== Speaking career ==
Since retiring as an athlete, Gavio has worked as a corporate speaker, addressing themes such as leadership, purpose, daily excellence, innovation, growth mindset, business management and discipline, drawing on his sports career; his talks are often framed around the twelve years between his Olympic gold medals in Barcelona 1992 and Athens 2004. He is also a certified coach through the Sociedade Brasileira de Coaching. He is one of the athletes featured in the documentary film Ouro, Suor e Lágrimas (2015), directed by Helena Sroulevich, about the most successful decade of Brazilian volleyball (2001–2012).

== Individual awards ==
- 1989 FIVB World Cup "Best Blocker"
- 1993 FIVB World League "Most Valuable Player"
- 2003 FIVB World Cup "Best Spiker"
