= Bernard Rajzman =

Brazilian volleyball player

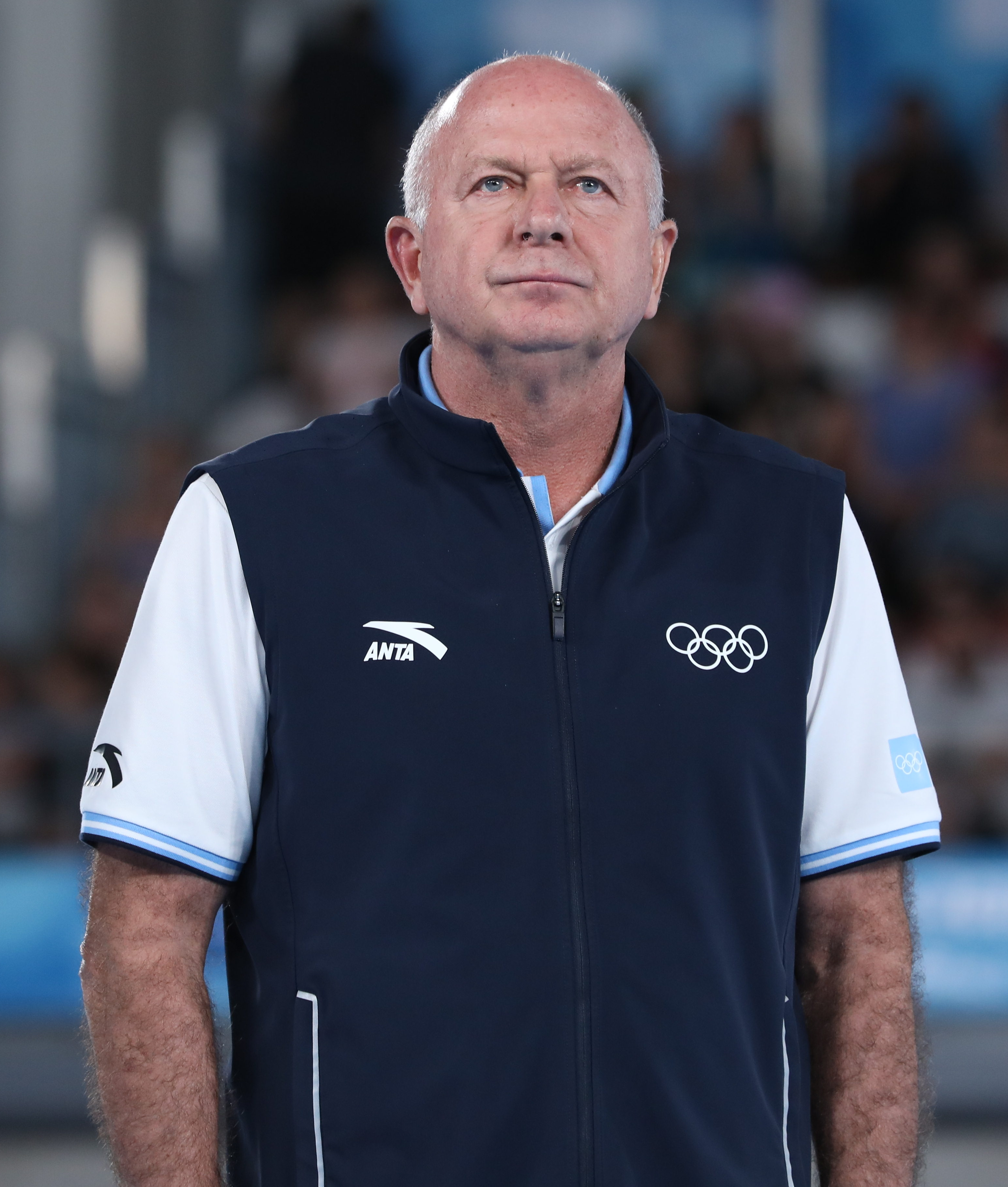

Personal information
- Born: 25 April 1957 (age 69); Rio de Janeiro, Brazil
- Height: 1.87 m (6 ft 2 in)

Volleyball information
- Position: Outside hitter
- Number: 6 (1976); 12 (1980–1984)

National team
1973–1987	Brazil
Honours
Men's volleyball
Representing Brazil
Olympic Games
Silver medal – second place	1984 Los Angeles	Team
World Championship
Silver medal – second place	1982 Argentina
FIVB World Cup
Bronze medal – third place	1981 Japan
Pan American Games
Gold medal – first place	1983 Caracas	Team
Silver medal – second place	1975 Mexico City	Team
Silver medal – second place	1979 Caguas	Team
Bronze medal – third place	1987 Indianapolis	Team
CSV South American Championship
Gold medal – first place	1973 Bucaramanga
Gold medal – first place	1975 Asunción
Gold medal – first place	1977 Lima
Gold medal – first place	1981 Santiago
Gold medal – first place	1983 São Paulo
Gold medal – first place	1987 Montevideo

Bernard Rajzman (born 25 April 1957) is a Brazilian former volleyball player and three-time Olympian. He was born in Rio de Janeiro. He was enshrined in the International Volleyball Hall of Fame in 2005. Nowadays, Bernard is a member of the International Olympic Committee (IOC).

Rajzman began his sports career at the age of 11, playing basketball for Fluminense, but traded the sport for volleyball because he was too short. At the age of 17, he joined the Brazilian men's national volleyball team, for which he played in three consecutive Olympics beginning in 1976, winning a silver medal in 1984. He also won seven South American Championships, one gold medal at the 1983 Pan American Games, a silver medal at the 1982 FIVB World Championship, and a bronze medal at the 1981 FIVB World Cup.

Rajzman developed the "Star Trek" serve, adapted from the beach volleyball, in which the ball is hit from below with enough force that it sails dozens of feet over the court.

== Personal life ==
Rajzman is the president of Brazil's National Commission of Athletes, and a state congressman.

Rajzman became an IOC member at the 125th IOC Session in Buenos Aires in September 2013.

He is the father of professional surfer Phil Rajzman.

== See also ==
- List of select Jewish volleyball players
