= Nalbert Bitencourt =

Brazilian volleyball player (born 1974)

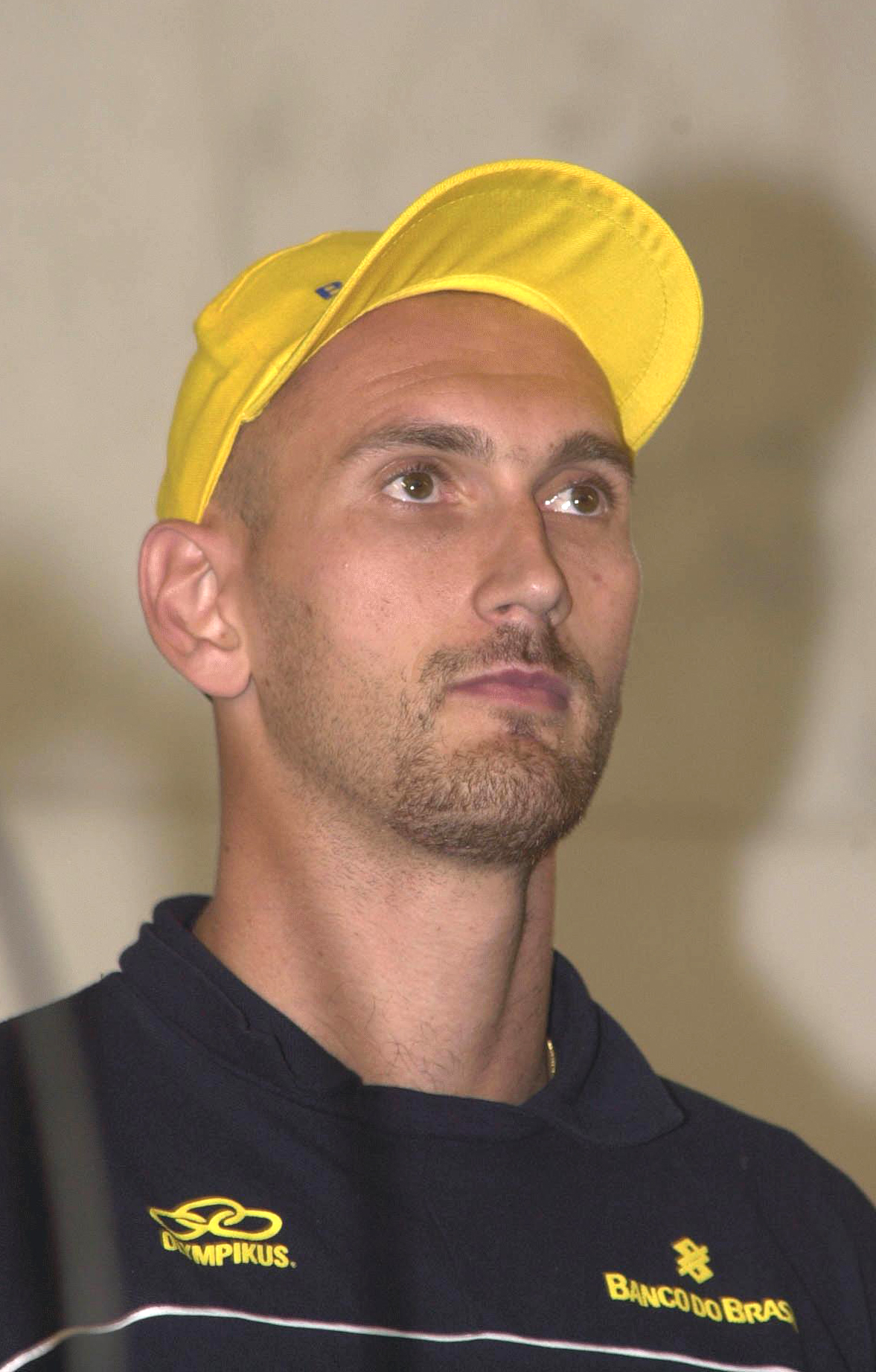

Personal information
- Full name: Nalbert Tavares Bitencourt
- Born: 9 March 1974 (age 52); Rio de Janeiro, Brazil
- Height: 1.96 m (6 ft 5 in)
- Weight: 91 kg (201 lb)

Volleyball information
- Position: Outside spiker
- Current club: Retired

Career
Years	Teams
1988–1990	(Brazil) Tijuca Tênis Clube
1990–1991	(Brazil) Flamengo Vôlei
1992–1994	(Brazil) Minas Tênis Clube
1994–1997	(Brazil) EC Banespa
1997–1999	(Brazil) Olimpikus
1999–2002	(Italy) Lube Volley
2002–2004	(Japan) Panasonic Panthers
2002–2004	(Italy) Lube Volley
2004–2005	(Brazil) Minas Tênis Clube
2006–2007	(Italy) Modena Volley
2007–2008	(Brazil) Minas Tênis Clube

National team
1995–2007	Brazil
Honours
Men's volleyball
Representing Brazil
Event	1st	2nd	3rd
Olympic Games	1	0	0
World Championship	1	0	0
World Cup	1	0	0
World Grand Champions Cup	1	1	0
World League	3	1	0
Pan American Games	0	0	1
South American Championship	4	0	0
Total	11	2	1
Olympic Games
Gold medal – first place	2004 Athens	Team
World Championship
Gold medal – first place	2002 Argentina	Team
World Cup
Gold medal – first place	2003 Japan	Team
World Grand Champions Cup
Gold medal – first place	1997 Japan	Team
Silver medal – second place	2001 Japan	Team
World League
Gold medal – first place	2001 Katowice	Team
Gold medal – first place	2003 Madrid	Team
Gold medal – first place	2007 Katowice	Team
Silver medal – second place	2002 Belo Horizonte	Team
Pan American Games
Bronze medal – third place	2003 Santo Domingo	Team
South American Championship
Gold medal – first place	1995 Brazil	
Gold medal – first place	1997 Venezuela	
Gold medal – first place	2001 Colombia	
Gold medal – first place	2003 Brazil	

Nalbert Tavares Bitencourt (born March 9, 1974), known as Nalbert, is a Brazilian former professional volleyball player.

He was born in Rio de Janeiro.

Nalbert is 195 cm (77 in) and played as passer-attacker. With Brazil national team he won two World Leagues (2003 and 2004), one World Cup (2003), a World (2002) and one Olympic gold medal.

== Sporting achievements ==
=== National team ===
- 1995 South American Championship
- 1997 South American Championship
- 1997 World Grand Champions Cup
- 2001 FIVB World League
- 2001 South American Championship
- 2001 World Grand Champions Cup
- 2002 FIVB World League
- 2002 FIVB World Championship
- 2003 FIVB World League
- 2003 Pan American Games
- 2003 South American Championship
- 2003 FIVB World Cup
- 2004 Olympic Games
- 2007 FIVB World League

=== Individual ===
- 1999 World Grand Champions Cup – Most Valuable Player
- 1997 World Grand Champions Cup – Best Scorer
- 1998–99 Brazilian Superliga – Most Valuable Player
- 2003 Pan American Games – Best Digger

Awards
Preceded by Robert Scheidt	Brazilian Sportsmen of the Year; 2002	Succeeded by Fernando Meligeni
