= 1962 Men's South American Volleyball Championship =

The 1962 Men's South American Volleyball Championship, the 5th tournament, took place in 1962 in Santiago (Chile).

== Final positions ==
Place	Team
	Brazil
	Argentina
	Venezuela
4	Paraguay
5	Chile
6	Uruguay
7	Peru
