= Marcos Milinkovic =

Argentine volleyball player

Personal information
- Full name: Marcos Antonio Milinkovic
- Born: 22 December 1971 (age 54); Villa Ballester, Argentina
- Hometown: Villa Ballester, Argentina
- Height: 2.05 m (6 ft 9 in)
- Weight: 99 kg (218 lb)
- Spike: 355 cm (140 in)
- Block: 338 cm (133 in)

Volleyball information
- Position: Wing spiker
- Number: 1

National team
1991–2007	Argentina
Honours
Men's volleyball
Representing Argentina
Pan American Games
Gold medal – first place	1995 Mar del Plata	Team
Bronze medal – third place	1991 Havana	Team
CSV South American Championship
Silver medal – second place	1991 Osasco
Silver medal – second place	1993 Córdoba
Silver medal – second place	1995 Porto Alegre
Silver medal – second place	1999 Córdoba
Bronze medal – third place	1997 Caracas

Marcos Antonio Milinkovic (born 22 December 1971) is an Argentine coach and former volleyball player. While playing for the Argentine men's national volleyball team, Milinkovic won a bronze medal at the 1991 Pan American Games in Havana and a gold medal at the 1995 Pan American Games in Mar del Plata.

Milinkovic started playing the sport at age 17, a relatively late age. Milinkovic is of Croatian descent.

Milinkovic received the Platinum Konex Award in 2010 as the best volleyball player of the last decade in Argentina.

== Clubs ==
- Sportivo Ballester (1988–1990)
- Obras Sanitarias de Buenos Aires (1990–1992)
- Tomei Livorno (1992–1993)
- Uliveto Tomei Livorno (1993–1994)
- Cocamar Paranà (1995–1996)
- Chapecoense Santa Catarina (1996–1997)
- Olimpikus Rio de Janeiro (1997–1999)
- Sisley Treviso (1999–2000)
- Asystel Milano (2000–2003)
- Unisul Florianopolis (2003–2004)
- Olympiacos S.C. (2004–2005)
- Cimed Florianopolis (2006–2007)
- Unión de formosa (2008–2010)
- Buenos Aires Unidos (2010–2013)
- C.D Voleibol San Pedro (2020–2021)

== Awards ==
=== National team ===
==== Individuals ====
- 2000 Summer Olympics "Best Scorer"
- 2002 FIVB World Championship "Most Valuable Player"
- 2002 FIVB World Championship "Best Scorer"

==== Team ====
- 1991 Pan American Games — Bronze Medal
- 1995 Pan American Games — Gold Medal

=== Clubs ===
==== Individuals ====
- 2005 Top Teams Cup — MVP

==== Team ====
- 1999–00 CEV Champions League — Champion, with Sisley Treviso
- 2000 Coppa Italia — Champion, with Livorno
- 2005 CEV Top Teams Cup — Champion, with Olympiacos

Awards
Preceded by (Spain) Rafael Pascual	2002 FIVB World Championship; Men's Most Valuable Player; 2002	Succeeded by (Brazil) Gilberto Godoy Filho
Preceded by (Spain) Rafael Pascual	2002 FIVB World Championship; Men's Best Scorer; 2002	Succeeded by (Puerto Rico) Héctor Soto
