= Renan Dal Zotto =

Brazilian volleyball player and coach

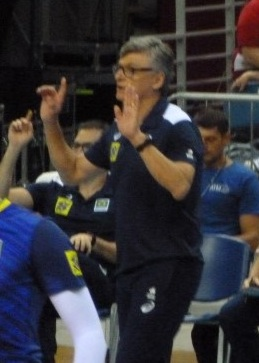
- Dal Zotto in 2019

Personal information
- Full name: Renan Dal Zotto
- Born: 19 July 1960 (age 66); São Leopoldo, Rio Grande do Sul, Brazil
- Height: 1.90 m (6 ft 3 in)

Coaching information
- Current team: Funvic Taubaté

Volleyball information
- Position: Outside hitter
- Number: 6

National team
1979–1989	Brazil
2016–2023	Brazil (head coach)
Honours
Men's volleyball (player)
Representing Brazil
Olympic Games
Silver medal – second place	1984 Los Angeles	Team
World Championship
Silver medal – second place	1982 Argentina
FIVB World Cup
Bronze medal – third place	1981 Japan
Pan American Games
Gold medal – first place	1983 Caracas	Team
Silver medal – second place	1979 Caguas	Team
Bronze medal – third place	1987 Indianapolis	Team
CSV South American Championship
Gold medal – first place	1979 Rosario
Gold medal – first place	1981 Santiago
Gold medal – first place	1983 São Paulo
Gold medal – first place	1985 Caracas

Renan Dal Zotto (born 19 July 1960), more commonly known as Renan, is a Brazilian former volleyball player who competed in three Summer Olympics and former head coach of the Brazilian men's national volleyball team. He was born in São Leopoldo, Rio Grande do Sul. In 1980, he was part of the Brazilian team that finished fifth in the Olympic tournament. He played five matches.

Four years later, Renan won the silver medal with the Brazilian team in the 1984 Olympic tournament. He played all six matches. At the 1988 Games, he was a member of the Brazilian team that finished fourth in the 1988 Olympic tournament. He played all seven matches.

In 2015, Renan was inducted into the International Volleyball Hall of Fame.

== Coaching ==
As coach, Renan worked mostly with clubs in Brazil, plus a season in Italy, all in the 1990s and 2000s.

In 2017, he was appointed as the new head coach of the Brazil men's team, replacing Bernardo Rezende who was in office during the last sixteen years.

Renan was also disciplined by the FIVB when cameras clearly showed him intentionally rolling a ball on court mid rally. This was during an important 5th set in 2018 vs Russia. In his statement, he failed to apologize for the incident or admit fault.
