= 1960 FIVB Men's Volleyball World Championship =

1960 FIVB World Championship
Tournament details
- Host country: Brazil
- Dates: 28 October – 11 November
- Teams: 14
- Venues: 5 (in 5 host cities)
- Officially opened by: Juscelino Kubitschek

Final positions
- Champions: Soviet Union (3rd title)

The 1960 FIVB Men's World Championship was the fourth edition of the tournament, organised by the world's governing body, the FIVB. It was held from 28 October to 11 November 1960 in Brazil.

== Teams ==
Pool A

- Brazil (Host)
- ~~India~~ (withdrew)
- Uruguay
- Venezuela

Pool B

- Japan
- Paraguay
- Soviet Union

Pool C

- Argentina
- Czechoslovakia
- Hungary

Pool D

- Peru
- Poland
- Romania

Pool E

- ~~Dominican Republic~~ (withdrew)
- ~~Mexico~~ (withdrew)
- France
- United States

== Results ==
=== First round ===
==== Pool A ====
Pos	Team	Pld	W	L	Pts	SW	SL	SR	SPW	SPL	SPR	Qualification
1	Brazil	2	2	0	4	6	0	MAX	90	37	2.432	Final places
2	Venezuela	2	1	1	3	3	4	0.750	70	95	0.737	Final places
3	Uruguay	2	0	2	2	1	6	0.167	71	99	0.717	11th–14th places

Location: Santo André

Date		Score		Set 1	Set 2	Set 3	Set 4	Set 5	Total
30 Oct	Venezuela	3–1	Uruguay	9–15	15–11	15–13	15–11		54–50

Location: Santos

Date		Score		Set 1	Set 2	Set 3	Set 4	Set 5	Total
30 Oct	Brazil	3–0	Uruguay	15–7	15–5	15–9			45–21
31 Oct	Brazil	3–0	Venezuela	15–6	15–4	15–6			45–16

==== Pool B ====
Pos	Team	Pld	W	L	Pts	SW	SL	SR	SPW	SPL	SPR	Qualification
1	Soviet Union	2	2	0	4	6	0	MAX	90	35	2.571	Final places
2	Japan	2	1	1	3	3	4	0.750	80	80	1.000	Final places
3	Paraguay	2	0	2	2	1	6	0.167	46	101	0.455	11th–14th places

Location: Santos

Date		Score		Set 1	Set 2	Set 3	Set 4	Set 5	Total
29 Oct	Soviet Union	3–0	Paraguay	15–2	15–7	15–2			45–11

Location: Santo André

Date		Score		Set 1	Set 2	Set 3	Set 4	Set 5	Total
30 Oct	Japan	3–1	Paraguay	15–7	15–12	11–15	15–1		56–35

Location: São Paulo

Date		Score		Set 1	Set 2	Set 3	Set 4	Set 5	Total
31 Oct	Soviet Union	3–0	Japan	15–8	15–9	15–7			45–24

==== Pool C ====
Location: São Paulo

Pos	Team	Pld	W	L	Pts	SW	SL	SR	SPW	SPL	SPR	Qualification
1	Czechoslovakia	2	2	0	4	6	1	6.000	100	64	1.563	Final places
2	Hungary	2	1	1	3	4	3	1.333	88	68	1.294	Final places
3	Argentina	2	0	2	2	0	6	0.000	34	90	0.378	11th–14th places

Date		Score		Set 1	Set 2	Set 3	Set 4	Set 5	Total
29 Oct	Czechoslovakia	3–0	Argentina	15–7	15–8	15–6			45–21
30 Oct	Hungary	3–0	Argentina	15–1	15–9	15–3			45–13
31 Oct	Czechoslovakia	3–1	Hungary	15–9	10–15	15–13	15–6		55–43

==== Pool D ====
Location: Belo Horizonte

Pos	Team	Pld	W	L	Pts	SW	SL	SR	SPW	SPL	SPR	Qualification
1	Romania	2	2	0	4	6	1	6.000	101	45	2.244	Final places
2	Poland	2	1	1	3	4	3	1.333	89	65	1.369	Final places
3	Peru	2	0	2	2	0	6	0.000	10	90	0.111	11th–14th places

Date		Score		Set 1	Set 2	Set 3	Set 4	Set 5	Total
29 Oct	Romania	3–0	Peru	15–0	15–0	15–1			45–1
30 Oct	Poland	3–0	Peru	15–3	15–1	15–5			45–9
31 Oct	Romania	3–1	Poland	15–11	15–9	11–15	15–9		56–44

==== Pool E ====
Location: Belo Horizonte

Pos	Team	Pld	W	L	Pts	SW	SL	SR	SPW	SPL	SPR	Qualification
1	United States	1	1	0	2	3	2	1.500	71	49	1.449	Final places
2	France	1	0	1	1	2	3	0.667	49	71	0.690	Final places

Date		Score		Set 1	Set 2	Set 3	Set 4	Set 5	Total
30 Oct	United States	3–2	France	15–10	13–15	13–15	15–0	15–9	71–49

=== Final round ===
The results and the points of the matches between the same teams that were already played during the first round are taken into account for the final round.

==== 11th–14th places ====
Pos	Team	Pld	W	L	Pts	SW	SL	SR	SPW	SPL	SPR
11	Argentina	3	3	0	6	9	5	1.800	190	171	1.111
12	Paraguay	3	2	1	5	8	4	2.000	165	134	1.231
13	Uruguay	3	1	2	4	6	6	1.000	150	144	1.042
14	Peru	3	0	3	3	1	9	0.111	89	145	0.614

Location: Volta Redonda

Date		Score		Set 1	Set 2	Set 3	Set 4	Set 5	Total
6 Nov	Argentina	3–2	Uruguay	7–15	15–9	15–13	14–16	15–10	66–63
6 Nov	Paraguay	3–0	Peru	15–8	15–5	15–10			45–23
8 Nov	Uruguay	3–0	Peru	15–8	15–3	15–10			45–21
8 Nov	Argentina	3–2	Paraguay	9–15	17–15	13–15	15–10	15–8	69–63
9 Nov	Paraguay	3–1	Uruguay	15–10	12–15	15–9	15–8		57–42

Location: Resende

Date		Score		Set 1	Set 2	Set 3	Set 4	Set 5	Total
9 Nov	Argentina	3–1	Peru	15–6	15–12	10–15	15–12		55–45

==== Final places ====
Pos	Team	Pld	W	L	Pts	SW	SL	SR	SPW	SPL	SPR
1	Soviet Union	9	9	0	18	27	5	5.400	463	324	1.429
2	Czechoslovakia	9	8	1	17	24	7	3.429	435	311	1.399
3	Romania	9	7	2	16	24	10	2.400	472	351	1.345
4	Poland	9	6	3	15	21	14	1.500	460	409	1.125
5	Brazil	9	4	5	13	18	17	1.059	458	423	1.083
6	Hungary	9	4	5	13	18	17	1.059	408	430	0.949
7	United States	9	4	5	13	16	20	0.800	427	435	0.982
8	Japan	9	2	7	11	8	21	0.381	330	378	0.873
9	France	9	1	8	10	6	24	0.250	289	433	0.667
10	Venezuela	9	0	9	9	0	27	0.000	159	407	0.391

Location: Rio de Janeiro

Date		Score		Set 1	Set 2	Set 3	Set 4	Set 5	Total
3 Nov	Soviet Union	3–0	United States	15–7	15–13	16–14			46–34

Location: Niterói

Date		Score		Set 1	Set 2	Set 3	Set 4	Set 5	Total
4 Nov	Hungary	3–0	Venezuela	15–7	15–4	15–8			45–19
4 Nov	Romania	3–0	Japan	15–9	15–7	15–13			45–29
4 Nov	Brazil	3–0	France	15–10	15–6	15–9			45–25

Location: Rio de Janeiro

Date		Score		Set 1	Set 2	Set 3	Set 4	Set 5	Total
4 Nov	Czechoslovakia	3–1	Poland	13–15	15–10	15–10	15–13		58–48

Location: Niterói

Date		Score		Set 1	Set 2	Set 3	Set 4	Set 5	Total
5 Nov	Soviet Union	3–0	Venezuela	15–4	15–11	15–2			45–17
5 Nov	Poland	3–1	Hungary	15–12	15–3	9–15	15–10		54–40
5 Nov	Czechoslovakia	3–0	Japan	15–13	15–11	15–9			45–33

Location: Rio de Janeiro

Date		Score		Set 1	Set 2	Set 3	Set 4	Set 5	Total
5 Nov	Romania	3–1	Brazil	10–15	15–11	15–13	15–9		55–48

Location: Niterói

Date		Score		Set 1	Set 2	Set 3	Set 4	Set 5	Total
6 Nov	Poland	3–1	Japan	15–5	11–15	15–8	15–9		56–37
6 Nov	Romania	3–1	United States	9–15	15–6	15–5	15–6		54–32
6 Nov	Soviet Union	3–1	Hungary	15–10	10–15	15–13	15–7		55–45

Location: Rio de Janeiro

Date		Score		Set 1	Set 2	Set 3	Set 4	Set 5	Total
6 Nov	Czechoslovakia	3–0	Brazil	15–13	15–8	15–6			45–27
6 Nov	France	3–0	Venezuela	15–13	15–4	17–15			47–32

Location: Niterói

Date		Score		Set 1	Set 2	Set 3	Set 4	Set 5	Total
7 Nov	Hungary	3–0	France	15–9	15–8	15–7			45–24
7 Nov	Romania	3–0	Venezuela	15–11	15–1	15–4			45–16
7 Nov	Czechoslovakia	3–0	United States	15–9	15–8	15–9			45–26

Location: Rio de Janeiro

Date		Score		Set 1	Set 2	Set 3	Set 4	Set 5	Total
7 Nov	Brazil	3–0	Japan	15–10	15–8	16–14			46–32
7 Nov	Soviet Union	3–1	Poland	7–15	15–4	15–8	15–11		52–38

Location: Niterói

Date		Score		Set 1	Set 2	Set 3	Set 4	Set 5	Total
9 Nov	Soviet Union	3–1	France	15–11	14–16	15–2	15–8		59–37
9 Nov	Poland	3–2	Brazil	15–8	19–21	15–13	11–15	15–11	75–68
9 Nov	Czechoslovakia	3–0	Venezuela	15–6	15–2	15–0			45–8

Location: Rio de Janeiro

Date		Score		Set 1	Set 2	Set 3	Set 4	Set 5	Total
9 Nov	United States	3–1	Japan	12–15	15–12	15–10	15–12		57–49
9 Nov	Romania	3–1	Hungary	13–15	15–5	15–6	15–6		58–32

Location: Niterói

Date		Score		Set 1	Set 2	Set 3	Set 4	Set 5	Total
10 Nov	Japan	3–0	Venezuela	15–3	15–4	15–3			45–10
10 Nov	Poland	3–0	France	15–13	15–13	15–9			45–35

Location: Rio de Janeiro

Date		Score		Set 1	Set 2	Set 3	Set 4	Set 5	Total
10 Nov	United States	3–2	Brazil	8–15	15–12	15–6	4–15	15–9	57–57
10 Nov	Soviet Union	3–1	Romania	15–13	16–14	10–15	15–11		56–53

Location: Niterói

Date		Score		Set 1	Set 2	Set 3	Set 4	Set 5	Total
11 Nov	Romania	3–0	France	15–5	15–9	15–9			45–23
11 Nov	Poland	3–1	United States	15–12	10–15	15–10	15–10		55–47

Location: Rio de Janeiro

Date		Score		Set 1	Set 2	Set 3	Set 4	Set 5	Total
11 Nov	Hungary	3–0	Japan	15–12	15–13	15–10			45–35
11 Nov	Soviet Union	3–0	Czechoslovakia	15–12	15–10	15–4			45–26

Location: Niterói

Date		Score		Set 1	Set 2	Set 3	Set 4	Set 5	Total
12 Nov	Czechoslovakia	3–0	France	15–8	15–8	15–4			45–20

Location: Rio de Janeiro

Date		Score		Set 1	Set 2	Set 3	Set 4	Set 5	Total
12 Nov	United States	3–0	Venezuela	15–8	15–6	15–11			45–25
12 Nov	Brazil	3–2	Hungary	15–8	14–16	13–15	15–11	15–8	72–58

Location: Niterói

Date		Score		Set 1	Set 2	Set 3	Set 4	Set 5	Total
13 Nov	Japan	3–0	France	16–14	15–6	15–9			46–29
13 Nov	Poland	3–0	Venezuela	15–2	15–10	15–4			45–16

Location: Rio de Janeiro

Date		Score		Set 1	Set 2	Set 3	Set 4	Set 5	Total
13 Nov	Hungary	3–2	United States	15–11	3–15	7–15	15–4	15–13	55–58
14 Nov	Soviet Union	3–1	Brazil	15–9	13–15	17–15	15–11		60–50
14 Nov	Czechoslovakia	3–2	Romania	15–6	11–15	15–12	15–17	15–11	71–61

== Final standing ==
Rank	Team
1st place, gold medalist(s)	Soviet Union
2nd place, silver medalist(s)	Czechoslovakia
3rd place, bronze medalist(s)	Romania
4	Poland
5	Brazil
6	Hungary
7	United States
8	Japan
9	France
10	Venezuela
11	Argentina
12	Paraguay
13	Uruguay
14	Peru

1960 Men's World champions

Soviet Union
3rd title
