= 1975 Men's South American Volleyball Championship =

The 1975 Men's South American Volleyball Championship, the 11th tournament, took place in 1975 in Asunción (Paraguay).

== Final positions ==
Place	Team
	Brazil
	Venezuela
	Argentina
4	Uruguay
5	Paraguay
6	Chile
7	Colombia
8	Peru

Source: Todor66.com
