= Andy Rojas =

Andy Rojas may refer to:

- Andy Rojas (volleyball) (born 1977), Venezuelan volleyball player
- Andy Rojas (footballer) (born 2005), Costa Rican footballer
