= Valderrama =

Valderrama may refer to:

== People ==
- Valderrama (surname)

== Places ==
- Valderrama, Antique, a municipality in the Philippines

== Other uses ==
- Valderrama Golf Club in Spain.
- Balderrama, the name of a zamba by Castilla and Leguizamón, which appears, interpreted by Mercedes Sosa, in the soundtrack of the second part of the Che film.
