= 2007 Men's South American Volleyball Championship =

The 2007 Men's South American Volleyball Championship was the 27th edition of the event, organised by South America's governing volleyball body, the Confederación Sudamericana de Voleibol (CSV). It was hosted in Viña del Mar (Polideportivo Sausalito) and Santiago, Chile (Estadio Víctor Jara) from September 5 to September 9, 2007. The winner (Brazil) and the runner-up (Argentina) qualified for the 2007 FIVB Men's World Cup in Japan, later that year.

== Teams ==
Group A – Viña del Mar

- Brazil
- Colombia
- Uruguay
- Venezuela

Group B – Santiago de Chile

- Argentina
- Chile (Hosts)
- Paraguay
- Peru

== Preliminary round ==
=== Group A ===
	Team	Points	G	W	L	PW	PL	Ratio	SW	SL	Ratio
1.	Brazil	6	3	3	0	226	154	1.468	9	0	MAX
2.	Venezuela	5	3	2	1	213	185	1.151	6	3	2.000
3.	Colombia	4	3	1	2	185	193	0.959	3	6	0.500
4.	Uruguay	3	3	0	3	133	225	0.591	0	9	0.000

- Wednesday 2007-09-05

Venezuela	3–0	Colombia	(25-14 25-23 25-20)
Brazil	3–0	Uruguay	(25-20 25-17 25-15)

- Thursday 2007-09-06

Venezuela	3–0	Uruguay	(25-20 25-17 25-15)
Brazil	3–0	Colombia	(25-15 25-19 25-19)

- Friday 2007-09-07

Brazil	3–0	Venezuela	(25-21 25-18 26-24)
Colombia	3–0	Uruguay	(25-12 25-21 25-10)

=== Group B ===
	Team	Points	G	W	L	PW	PL	Ratio	SW	SL	Ratio
1.	Argentina	6	3	3	0	258	188	1.372	9	2	4.500
2.	Chile (H)	5	3	2	1	226	206	1.097	6	4	1.500
3.	Paraguay	4	3	1	2	272	285	0.954	6	7	0.857
4.	Peru	3	3	0	3	173	250	0.692	1	9	0.111

- Wednesday 2007-09-05

Argentina	3–2	Paraguay	(23-25 25-14 20-25 25-18 15-6)
Chile	3–0	Peru	(25-18 25-13 25-16)

- Thursday 2007-09-06

Argentina	3–0	Peru	(25-17 25-16 25-16)
Chile	3–1	Paraguay	(25-13 26-24 24-26 25-21)

- Friday 2007-09-07

Paraguay	3–1	Peru	(25-20 25-12 25-27 25-18)
Argentina	3–0	Chile	(25-15 25-16 25-20)

== Final round ==
Semi-finals
2007-09-08 – Santiago de Chile
Brazil	3
Chile	0
2007-09-08 – Santiago de Chile
Argentina	3
Venezuela	2

Final
2007-09-09 – Santiago de Chile
Brazil	3
Argentina	0
3rd place
2007-09-09 – Santiago de Chile
Chile	1
Venezuela	3

- Saturday 2007-09-08

Brazil	3–0	Chile	(25-16 25-22 25-17)
Argentina	3–2	Venezuela	(21-25 25-21 25-23 22-25 15-13)

- Sunday 2007-09-09

Chile	1–3	Venezuela	(23-25 25-17 20-25 20-25)
Brazil	3–0	Argentina	(25-15 25-17 39-37)

5-8th place
2007-09-08 – Viña del Mar
Paraguay	3
Uruguay	0
2007-09-08 – Viña del Mar
Colombia	3
Peru	1

5th place
2007-09-09 – Viña del Mar
Paraguay	3
Colombia	1
7th place
2007-09-09 – Viña del Mar
Uruguay	3
Peru	2

- Saturday 2007-09-08

Paraguay	3–0	Uruguay	(25-23 25-21 25-21)
Colombia	3–1	Peru	(25-17 25-17 22-25 25-21)

- Sunday 2007-09-09

Uruguay	3–2	Peru	(25-22 25-22 16-25 19-25 17-15)
Paraguay	3–1	Colombia	(23-25 25-18 25-22 25-21)

== Final ranking ==
Rank	Team
1st place, gold medalist(s)	Brazil
2nd place, silver medalist(s)	Argentina
3rd place, bronze medalist(s)	Venezuela
4.	Chile
5.	Paraguay
6.	Colombia
7.	Uruguay
8.	Peru

2007 Men's South American champions

Brazil
26th title
