= Régulo Briceño =

Venezuelan volleyball player (born 1989)

Personal information
- Full name: Regulo Alberto Briceno
- Nationality: Venezuelan
- Born: 13 February 1989 (age 37)
- Height: 1.75 m (5 ft 9 in)
- Weight: 85 kg (187 lb)
- Spike: 332 cm (131 in)
- Block: 327 cm (129 in)

Career
Years	Teams
2010-2014	Aragua VC

National team
2010-2014	Venezuela

Régulo Alberto Briceño (born 13 February 1989) is a Venezuelan male volleyball player. He was part of the Venezuela men's national volleyball team at the 2010 FIVB Volleyball Men's World Championship in Italy and at the 2014 FIVB Volleyball Men's World Championship in Poland. He played with Aragua VC.

== Clubs ==
- (Venezuela) Aragua VC (2010–2014)
