= Máximo Montoya =

Venezuelan volleyball player (born 1989)

Personal information
- Full name: Maximo Antonio Montoya Martine
- Nationality: Venezuelan
- Born: 26 June 1989 (age 37)
- Height: 1.98 m (6 ft 6 in)
- Weight: 86 kg (190 lb)
- Spike: 347 cm (137 in)
- Block: 343 cm (135 in)

Career
Years	Teams
2014	Apure

National team
2014	Venezuela

Máximo Antonio Montoya Martine (born 26 June 1989) is a Venezuelan male volleyball player. He was part of the Venezuela men's national volleyball team at the 2014 FIVB Volleyball Men's World Championship in Poland. He played for Apure.

== Clubs ==
- (Venezuela) Apure (2014)
