= Jhonlen Barreto =

Venezuelan volleyball player (born 1987)

Personal information
- Full name: Jhonlen Cruz Barreto Peña
- Nationality: Venezuelan
- Born: 14 May 1987 (age 39); San felix Estado Bolívar.
- Hometown: Bolívar.
- Height: 1.89 m (6 ft 2 in)
- Weight: 87 kg (192 lb)
- Spike: 3 50 cm
- Block: 3.35 m (132 in)ts

Volleyball information
- Position: Receptor punta.
- Number: 17

National team
2015– actualidad.	Venezuela

Jhonlen Cruz Barreto Peña (born 14 May 1987) is a Venezuelan male volleyball player. He is part of the Venezuela men's national volleyball team.
