= 1964 Men's South American Volleyball Championship =

The 1964 Men's South American Volleyball Championship, the 6th tournament, took place from 30 March to 8 April 1964 in Buenos Aires, Argentina.

The VI South American Men's Volleyball Championship of 1964 was held in Buenos Aires city, Argentina, between the end of March and the beginning of April 1964. The champion was Argentina, for the first time in history.

With five teams competing, since Brazil did not attend due to political conflicts, Argentina won the last match against Venezuela 3-2 (13-15, 15-8, 15-6, 13-15 and 15-10) and stayed with the title.

The podium was completed by Venezuela and Uruguay; fourth Paraguay and fifth Ecuador.

Argentina was coached by Cesar Gallardo and had these players:

Julio Sorrequieta

Jose Luis Arlandini

Carlos Cortez

Federico Diaz

Raul Florentino

Osvaldo Intrieri

Angel Logiudice

Raul Massai

Leopoldo "Chulo" Olmo

Rafael Raffaele

Roberto Ramos

Fernando Sorrentino

== Notes ==
Brazil did not compete in 1964 due to political turmoil in the country.

== Final positions ==
Place	Team
	Argentina
	Venezuela
	Uruguay
4	Paraguay
5	Ecuador
