= 2001 FIVB Volleyball World League =

International sport competition

2001 World League
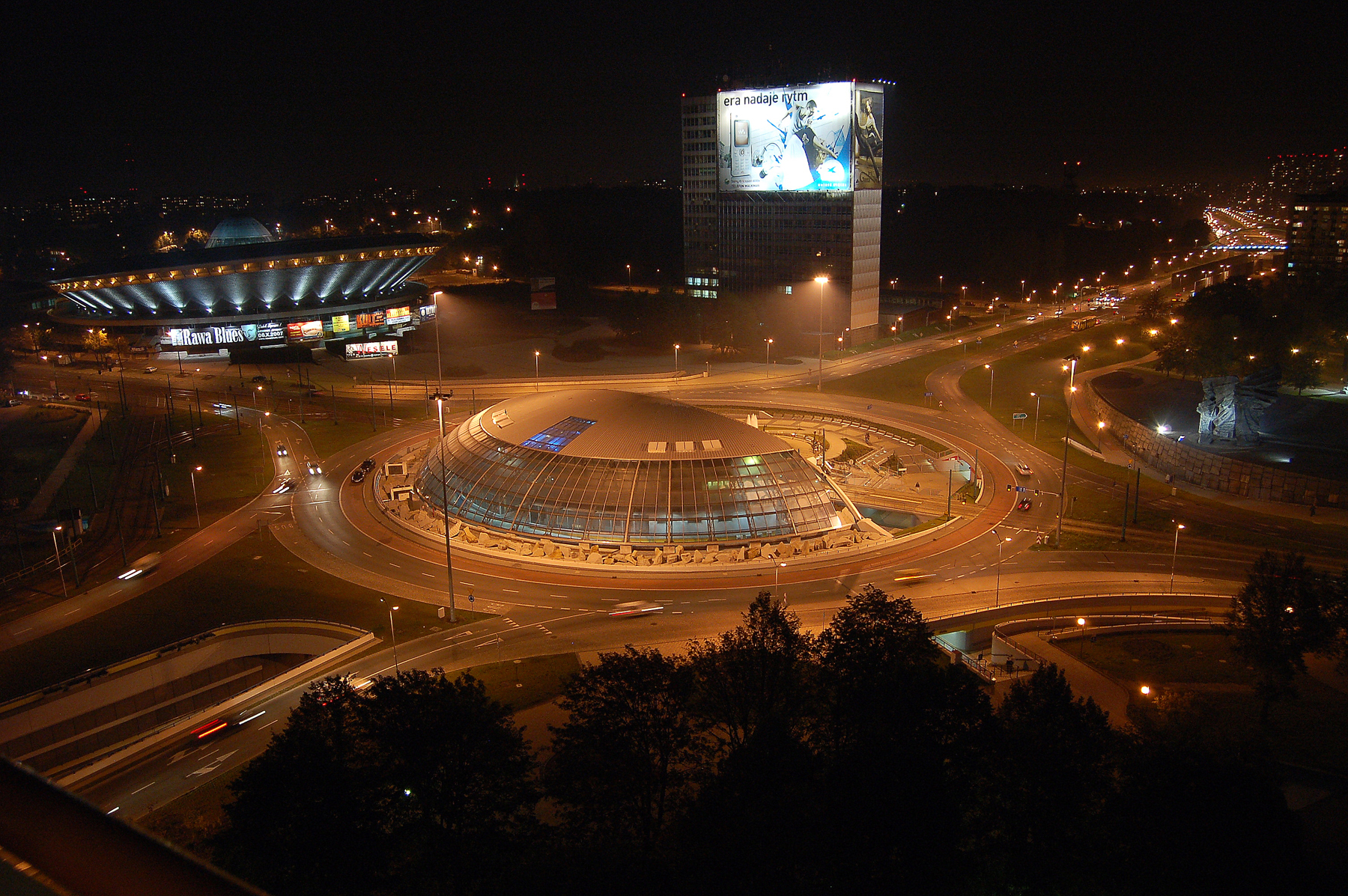
- Spodek Host Final

Tournament details
- Host country: Poland (Final)
- Dates: 11 May – 30 June
- Teams: 16

Final positions
- Champions: Brazil (2nd title)

Tournament awards
- MVP: (Serbia and Montenegro) Ivan Miljković

The 2001 FIVB Volleyball World League was the 12th edition of the annual men's international volleyball tournament, played by 16 countries from 11 May to 30 June 2001. The Final Round was held in Katowice, Poland.

== Pools composition ==
Pool A	Pool B	Pool C	Pool D
Italy; France; Spain; Argentina	Poland; Greece; Russia; Venezuela	Yugoslavia; Japan; Cuba; Portugal	Brazil; United States; Netherlands; Germany

== Intercontinental round ==
=== Pool A ===
Pos	Team	Pld	W	L	Pts	SW	SL	SR	SPW	SPL	SPR	Qualification
1	Italy	12	9	3	21	30	15	2.000	1059	972	1.090	Final round
2	France	12	8	4	20	27	21	1.286	1117	1074	1.040	Final round
3	Spain	12	5	7	17	23	28	0.821	1109	1148	0.966	
4	Argentina	12	2	10	14	16	32	0.500	1067	1158	0.921	

Date		Score		Set 1	Set 2	Set 3	Set 4	Set 5	Total
11 May	Italy	3–0	Argentina	25–18	25–19	25–18			75–55
11 May	Spain	0–3	France	16–25	20–25	20–25			56–75
13 May	Spain	2–3	France	22–25	25–20	19–25	25–23	11–15	102–108
13 May	Italy	3–0	Argentina	25–14	25–22	25–21			75–57
18 May	Spain	3–0	Italy	25–23	25–17	26–24			76–64
18 May	France	3–1	Argentina	21–25	27–25	25–19	25–20		98–89
19 May	France	1–3	Argentina	25–27	25–23	22–25	22–25		94–100
20 May	Spain	2–3	Italy	29–27	24–26	17–25	25–23	10–15	105–116
25 May	Argentina	1–3	France	22–25	26–24	28–30	22–25		98–104
25 May	Italy	3–2	Spain	25–22	27–25	17–25	23–25	15–11	107–108
26 May	Argentina	3–1	France	25–20	20–25	25–22	26–24		96–91
27 May	Italy	3–0	Spain	25–15	25–20	25–20			75–55
1 Jun	Italy	1–3	France	30–28	20–25	20–25	19–25		89–103
2 Jun	Argentina	1–3	Spain	19–25	23–25	25–21	22–25		89–96
3 Jun	Argentina	2–3	Spain	23–25	21–25	25–22	28–26	12–15	109–113
3 Jun	Italy	3–0	France	25–20	25–22	25–18			75–60
8 Jun	France	3–1	Spain	29–27	25–22	19–25	25–22		98–96
9 Jun	Argentina	0–3	Italy	25–27	29–31	14–25			68–83
9 Jun	France	3–1	Spain	25–20	23–25	25–17	25–17		98–79
10 Jun	Argentina	1–3	Italy	24–26	32–30	21–25	20–25		97–106
15 Jun	Spain	3–2	Argentina	25–18	22–25	25–21	28–30	15–12	115–106
15 Jun	France	1–3	Italy	21–25	25–19	20–25	19–25		85–94
16 Jun	France	3–2	Italy	25–20	19–25	19–25	25–21	15–9	103–100
17 Jun	Spain	3–2	Argentina	25–21	25–20	22–25	21–25	15–12	108–103

=== Pool B ===
Pos	Team	Pld	W	L	Pts	SW	SL	SR	SPW	SPL	SPR	Qualification
1	Russia	12	8	4	20	28	14	2.000	1009	861	1.172	Final round
2	Poland (Note: Qualified as hosts) (H)	12	7	5	19	25	22	1.136	1073	1062	1.010	Final round
3	Greece	12	6	6	18	24	25	0.960	1123	1119	1.004	
4	Venezuela	12	3	9	15	16	32	0.500	978	1141	0.857	

(H) Host
Notes:

Date		Score		Set 1	Set 2	Set 3	Set 4	Set 5	Total
11 May	Russia	3–0	Venezuela	25–20	25–13	25–19			75–52
11 May	Poland	3–0	Greece	25–21	25–22	25–21			75–64
12 May	Russia	3–0	Venezuela	25–17	25–18	25–21			75–56
12 May	Poland	2–3	Greece	25–23	26–28	22–25	27–25	15–17	115–118
18 May	Poland	1–3	Venezuela	19–25	25–15	24–26	24–26		92–92
18 May	Greece	3–1	Russia	25–18	27–25	22–25	25–20		99–88
19 May	Poland	3–0	Venezuela	25–20	25–19	25–22			75–61
19 May	Greece	3–0	Russia	25–23	26–24	25–21			76–68
25 May	Poland	1–3	Russia	33–31	23–25	21–25	23–25		100–106
25 May	Venezuela	1–3	Greece	19–25	17–25	25–20	19–25		80–95
26 May	Poland	0–3	Russia	23–25	22–25	19–25			64–75
27 May	Venezuela	2–3	Greece	18–25	26–24	26–24	21–25	8–15	99–113
1 Jun	Russia	1–3	Greece	22–25	23–25	25–21	23–25		93–96
1 Jun	Venezuela	2–3	Poland	20–25	20–25	25–22	25–23	12–15	102–110
2 Jun	Russia	3–1	Greece	25–18	25–21	22–25	25–13		97–77
3 Jun	Venezuela	2–3	Poland	23–25	20–25	25–23	32–30	14–16	114–119
8 Jun	Venezuela	0–3	Russia	14–25	21–25	13–25			48–75
8 Jun	Greece	0–3	Poland	18–25	19–25	19–25			56–75
9 Jun	Greece	1–3	Poland	21–25	25–21	22–25	24–26		92–97
10 Jun	Venezuela	0–3	Russia	11–25	18–25	13–25			42–75
15 Jun	Russia	3–0	Poland	25–19	25–14	25–19			75–52
15 Jun	Greece	2–3	Venezuela	31–29	25–19	23–25	32–34	12–15	123–122
16 Jun	Russia	2–3	Poland	25–11	20–25	25–22	23–25	14–16	107–99
16 Jun	Greece	2–3	Venezuela	23–25	23–25	25–20	25–20	18–20	114–110

=== Pool C ===
Pos	Team	Pld	W	L	Pts	SW	SL	SR	SPW	SPL	SPR	Qualification
1	Cuba	12	10	2	22	32	10	3.200	1028	897	1.146	Final round
2	Yugoslavia	12	10	2	22	31	11	2.818	1026	863	1.189	Final round
3	Japan	12	3	9	15	15	28	0.536	941	1022	0.921	
4	Portugal	12	1	11	13	5	34	0.147	761	974	0.781	

Date		Score		Set 1	Set 2	Set 3	Set 4	Set 5	Total
11 May	Cuba	3–0	Portugal	25–15	25–21	25–23			75–59
12 May	Japan	0–3	Yugoslavia	17–25	22–25	24–26			63–76
12 May	Cuba	3–0	Portugal	25–20	25–16	25–18			75–54
13 May	Japan	1–3	Yugoslavia	27–25	19–25	23–25	16–25		85–100
18 May	Cuba	3–0	Japan	25–20	25–21	25–14			75–55
19 May	Portugal	0–3	Yugoslavia	21–25	14–25	25–27			60–77
19 May	Cuba	3–1	Japan	25–17	25–17	24–26	25–23		99–83
20 May	Portugal	0–3	Yugoslavia	14–25	15–25	16–25			45–75
25 May	Cuba	3–1	Yugoslavia	25–20	25–23	33–35	25–23		108–101
26 May	Portugal	0–3	Japan	16–25	23–25	20–25			59–75
26 May	Cuba	3–0	Yugoslavia	25–21	26–24	25–19			76–64
27 May	Portugal	3–1	Japan	26–24	21–25	29–27	25–23		101–99
1 Jun	Yugoslavia	3–0	Portugal	25–11	25–21	25–15			75–47
2 Jun	Japan	0–3	Cuba	19–25	15–25	23–25			57–75
3 Jun	Japan	1–3	Cuba	25–22	25–27	24–26	13–25		87–100
3 Jun	Yugoslavia	3–0	Portugal	25–15	25–12	25–18			75–45
8 Jun	Yugoslavia	3–2	Japan	25–18	25–18	27–29	23–25	15–10	115–100
9 Jun	Portugal	1–3	Cuba	25–18	17–25	18–25	25–27		85–95
10 Jun	Portugal	0–3	Cuba	25–27	17–25	17–25			59–77
10 Jun	Yugoslavia	3–0	Japan	25–23	25–16	25–22			75–61
15 Jun	Yugoslavia	3–1	Cuba	25–16	21–25	25–20	25–22		96–83
16 Jun	Japan	3–1	Portugal	27–25	26–24	23–25	25–20		101–94
16 Jun	Yugoslavia	3–1	Cuba	22–25	25–20	25–22	25–23		97–90
17 Jun	Japan	3–0	Portugal	25–23	25–18	25–12			75–53

=== Pool D ===
Pos	Team	Pld	W	L	Pts	SW	SL	SR	SPW	SPL	SPR	Qualification
1	Brazil	12	11	1	23	35	11	3.182	1086	894	1.215	Final round
2	Netherlands	12	7	5	19	28	22	1.273	1115	1106	1.008	Final round
3	United States	12	6	6	18	20	25	0.800	996	1048	0.950	
4	Germany	12	0	12	12	11	36	0.306	985	1134	0.869	

Date		Score		Set 1	Set 2	Set 3	Set 4	Set 5	Total
11 May	Netherlands	2–3	Brazil	16–25	25–22	25–22	14–25	12–15	92–109
12 May	Germany	1–3	United States	34–36	26–28	25–20	21–25		106–109
13 May	Germany	0–3	United States	23–25	22–25	10–25			55–75
13 May	Netherlands	1–3	Brazil	21–25	25–22	17–25	20–25		83–97
19 May	United States	3–2	Netherlands	25–21	23–25	20–25	26–24	24–22	118–117
19 May	Germany	1–3	Brazil	21–25	14–25	25–22	22–25		82–97
20 May	Germany	1–3	Brazil	14–25	25–19	23–25	24–26		86–95
20 May	United States	1–3	Netherlands	23–25	25–19	22–25	20–25		90–94
25 May	Netherlands	3–1	Germany	25–15	16–25	25–22	25–21		91–83
26 May	United States	0–3	Brazil	22–25	12–25	15–25			49–75
27 May	Netherlands	3–2	Germany	25–22	25–16	20–25	26–28	15–10	111–101
27 May	United States	3–2	Brazil	13–25	20–25	27–25	25–22	15–13	100–110
2 Jun	Brazil	3–0	United States	25–19	25–11	25–19			75–49
2 Jun	Germany	1–3	Netherlands	19–25	25–16	23–25	21–25		88–91
3 Jun	Brazil	3–0	United States	25–22	25–23	25–23			75–68
3 Jun	Germany	1–3	Netherlands	17–25	25–23	21–25	28–30		91–103
9 Jun	Brazil	3–0	Netherlands	25–20	25–18	25–23			75–61
9 Jun	United States	3–2	Germany	25–20	25–23	23–25	22–25	15–12	110–105
10 Jun	Brazil	3–2	Netherlands	21–25	25–16	25–21	22–25	15–10	108–97
10 Jun	United States	3–0	Germany	32–30	25–15	25–16			82–61
15 Jun	Netherlands	3–1	United States	25–23	25–18	21–25	25–19		96–85
16 Jun	Brazil	3–0	Germany	25–18	26–24	25–21			76–63
17 Jun	Brazil	3–1	Germany	25–7	25–19	19–25	25–13		94–64
17 Jun	Netherlands	3–0	United States	25–17	29–27	25–17			79–61

== Final round ==
- Venue: Spodek, Katowice, Poland

=== Pool play ===
==== Pool E ====
Pos	Team	Pld	W	L	Pts	SW	SL	SR	SPW	SPL	SPR	Qualification
1	Brazil	3	3	0	6	9	3	3.000	293	245	1.196	Semifinals
2	Yugoslavia	3	1	2	4	6	6	1.000	273	270	1.011	Semifinals
3	France	3	1	2	4	6	8	0.750	304	321	0.947	
4	Poland	3	1	2	4	4	8	0.500	252	286	0.881	

Date		Score		Set 1	Set 2	Set 3	Set 4	Set 5	Total
25 Jun	Yugoslavia	2–3	France	25–18	31–33	26–28	25–21	11–15	118–115
25 Jun	Poland	1–3	Brazil	26–24	15–25	26–28	18–25		85–102
26 Jun	Poland	3–2	France	21–25	25–22	19–25	26–24	15–13	106–109
26 Jun	Yugoslavia	1–3	Brazil	25–19	15–25	19–25	21–25		80–94
27 Jun	Poland	0–3	Yugoslavia	22–25	22–25	17–25			61–75
27 Jun	Brazil	3–1	France	25–20	25–13	22–25	25–22		97–80

==== Pool F ====
Pos	Team	Pld	W	L	Pts	SW	SL	SR	SPW	SPL	SPR	Qualification
1	Italy	3	2	1	5	8	4	2.000	285	252	1.131	Semifinals
2	Russia	3	2	1	5	8	6	1.333	312	308	1.013	Semifinals
3	Cuba	3	2	1	5	6	6	1.000	270	275	0.982	
4	Netherlands	3	0	3	3	3	9	0.333	255	287	0.889	

Date		Score		Set 1	Set 2	Set 3	Set 4	Set 5	Total
25 Jun	Netherlands	1–3	Cuba	20–25	18–25	26–24	25–27		89–101
25 Jun	Italy	2–3	Russia	26–24	26–28	24–26	25–18	13–15	114–111
26 Jun	Italy	3–1	Netherlands	21–25	25–16	25–21	25–19		96–81
26 Jun	Russia	2–3	Cuba	27–29	25–18	21–25	25–22	13–15	111–109
27 Jun	Russia	3–1	Netherlands	25–23	25–19	15–25	25–18		90–85
27 Jun	Cuba	0–3	Italy	21–25	17–25	22–25			60–75

=== Final four ===
Semifinals
29 June
Yugoslavia	2
Italy	3
29 June
Brazil	3
Russia	2

Final
30 June
Italy	0
Brazil	3
3rd place match
30 June
Yugoslavia	0
Russia	3

==== Semifinals ====
Date		Score		Set 1	Set 2	Set 3	Set 4	Set 5	Total
29 Jun	Yugoslavia	2–3	Italy	25–22	25–19	22–25	22–25	12–15	106–106
29 Jun	Brazil	3–2	Russia	25–19	25–19	24–26	23–25	20–18	117–107

==== 3rd place match ====
Date		Score		Set 1	Set 2	Set 3	Set 4	Set 5	Total
30 Jun	Yugoslavia	0–3	Russia	20–25	20–25	23–25			63–75

==== Final ====
Date		Score		Set 1	Set 2	Set 3	Set 4	Set 5	Total
30 Jun	Italy	0–3	Brazil	15–25	22–25	19–25			56–75

== Final standing ==
Rank	Team
1st place, gold medalist(s)	Brazil
2nd place, silver medalist(s)	Italy
3rd place, bronze medalist(s)	Russia
4	Yugoslavia
5	Cuba
5	France
7	Netherlands
7	Poland
9	Greece
9	Japan
9	Spain
9	United States
13	Argentina
13	Germany
13	Portugal
13	Venezuela

2001 World League champions

Brazil
2nd title

Team Roster
Giovane Gávio, André Heller, Henrique Randow, Mauricio Lima, Gilberto Godoy Filho, André Nascimento, Sérgio Dutra Santos, Anderson Rodrigues, Nalbert Bitencourt, Gustavo Endres, Ricardo Garcia, Dante Amaral
Head coach
Bernardo Rezende

== Awards ==
- Best scorer
  - (Federal Republic of Yugoslavia) Ivan Miljković
- Best spiker
  - (Brazil) André Nascimento
- Best blocker
  - (Brazil) Gustavo Endres
- Best server
  - (Italy) Luigi Mastrangelo
