= Ronald Méndez =

Venezuelan volleyball player (born 1982)

Personal information
- Full name: Ronald Jose Méndez Garcia
- Born: 26 October 1982 (age 44); Ciudad Bolívar, Bolívar, Venezuela
- Height: 203 cm (6 ft 8 in)
- Weight: 84 kg (185 lb)
- Spike: 357 cm (141 in)
- Block: 352 cm (139 in)

Career
Years	Teams
2009	Bolivar

National team
2002–2009	Venezuela
Honours
Men's volleyball
Representing Venezuela
Pan American Games
Gold medal – first place	2003 Santo Domingo	Team

Ronald Jose Méndez Garcia (born October 26, 1982) is a volleyball player from Venezuela, who won the gold medal with the men's national team at the 2003 Pan American Games in Santo Domingo, Dominican Republic. In the final Méndez' team defeated Cuba 3–0 (25–23, 25–18, 25–20).

He was born in Ciudad Bolívar, Bolívar, Venezuela.
