= Venezuela men's national volleyball team =

National sports team

Venezuela
- Association: Federación Venezolana de Voleibol (FVV)
- Confederation: CSV
- Head coach: Ronald Sarti
- FIVB ranking: 56 ▼8 (1 October 2026)

Uniforms
Home	Away

Summer Olympics
- Appearances: 2 (First in 2008)
- Best result: 9th (2008)

World Championship
- Appearances: 11 (First in 1960)
- Best result: 10th (1960)

World Cup
- Appearances: 2 (First in 2003)
- Best result: 8th (2003)

South American Championship
- Appearances: 27 (First in 1962)
- Best result: (1964, 1967, 1969, 1975, 1977, 1979, 1985, 1997, 2003, 2017)
- www.fvvoficial.com.ve
Honours
Pan American Games
Gold medal – first place	2003 Santo Domingo	Team
South American Championship
Silver medal – second place	1964 Buenos Aires	Team
Silver medal – second place	1967 Santos	Team
Silver medal – second place	1969 Caracas	Team
Silver medal – second place	1975 Asunción	Team
Silver medal – second place	1977 Lima	Team
Silver medal – second place	1979 Rosario	Team
Silver medal – second place	1985 Caracas	Team
Silver medal – second place	1997 Caracas	Team
Silver medal – second place	2003 Rio de Janeiro	Team
Silver medal – second place	2017 Santiago/Temuco	Team
Bronze medal – third place	1962 Santos	Team
Bronze medal – third place	1973 Bucaramanga	Team
Bronze medal – third place	1987 Montevideo	Team
Bronze medal – third place	1989 Curitiba	Team
Bronze medal – third place	1991 São Paulo	Team
Bronze medal – third place	1995 Porte Alegre	Team
Bronze medal – third place	1999 Córdoba	Team
Bronze medal – third place	2001 Cali	Team
Bronze medal – third place	2005 Lages	Team
Bronze medal – third place	2007 Santiago	Team
Copa América
Bronze medal – third place	2025 Betim	Team
Central American and Caribbean Games
Bronze medal – third place	2006 Cartagena	Team

The Venezuela men's national volleyball team represents Venezuela in international volleyball competitions and friendly matches. In 1962 the squad claimed its first international medal (a bronze) at the South American Championship.

The biggest success for Venezuela came in 2003, when the team won the Pan American Games.

== Competition record ==
=== Olympic Games ===
Champions Runners-up 3rd place 4th place

Olympic Games record									Qualification record				
Year	Round	Position	GP	MW	ML	SW	SL	Squad	GP	MW	ML	SW	SL
(Japan) 1964	Did not qualify								1963 Pan American Games				
(Mexico) 1968	Did not qualify								1967 Pan American Games				
(West Germany) 1972	Did not qualify								1971 South American Championship				
(Canada) 1976	Did not qualify								Qualified but withdrew				
(Soviet Union) 1980	Did not qualify								1979 South American Championship				
(United States) 1984	Did not qualify								1983 South American Championship				
(South Korea) 1988	Did not qualify								5	0	5	1	15
(Spain) 1992	Did not qualify								Did not enter				
(United States) 1996	Did not qualify								6	2	4	9	12
(Australia) 2000	Did not qualify								3	1	2	4	6
(Greece) 2004	Did not qualify								6	4	2	12	9
(China) 2008	Preliminary round	9th place	5	1	4	8	12	Squad	4	4	0	12	1
(United Kingdom) 2012	Did not qualify								10	3	7	10	22
(Brazil) 2016	Did not qualify								10	2	8	14	27
(Japan) 2020	Preliminary round	12th place	5	0	5	1	15	Squad	3	2	1	8	4
(France) 2024	Did not qualify								Did not qualify				
(United States) 2028	To be determined								To be determined				
(Australia) 2032	To be determined								To be determined				
Total	0 Title	2/18	10	1	9	9	27	—	47	18	29	70	96

=== World Championship ===
- 2002 — 17th place
- 2006 — 17th place
- 2010 — 19th place
- 2014 — 17th place

=== World League ===
- 1990 to 2000 — did not compete
- 2001 — 13th place
- 2002 — 13th place
- 2003 — 13th place
- 2004 — did not compete
- 2005 — 7th place
- 2006 — did not compete
- 2007 — did not compete
- 2008 — 13th place
- 2009 — 16th place
- 2010 to 2014 — did not compete
- 2015 — 30th place
- 2016 — 30th place
- 2017 — 34th place

=== South American Championship ===
- (Chile) 1962 — (bronze) 3rd place
- (Argentina) 1964 — (silver) Runners up
- (Brazil) 1967 — (silver) Runners up
- (Venezuela) 1969 — (silver) Runners up
- (Colombia) 1973 — (bronze) 3rd place
- (Paraguay) 1975 — (silver) Runners up
- (Peru) 1977 — (silver) Runners up
- (Argentina) 1979 — (silver) Runners up
- (Chile) 1981 — 4th place
- (Brazil) 1983 — 4th place
- (Venezuela) 1985 — (silver) Runners up
- (Uruguay) 1987 — (bronze) 3rd place
- (Brazil) 1989 — (bronze) 3rd place
- (Brazil) 1991 — (bronze) 3rd place
- (Argentina) 1993 — 4th place
- (Brazil) 1995 — (bronze) 3rd place
- (Venezuela) 1997 — (silver) Runners up
- (Argentina) 1999 — (bronze) 3rd place
- (Colombia) 2001 — (bronze) 3rd place
- (Brazil) 2003 — (silver) Runners up
- (Brazil) 2005 — (bronze) 3rd place
- (Chile) 2007 — (bronze) 3rd place
- (Colombia) 2009 — (bronze) 3rd place
- (Brazil) 2011 — (bronze) 3rd place
- (Brazil) 2015 — 4th place
- (Chile) 2017 — (silver) Runners up
- (Chile) 2019 — 4th place

=== Copa América ===
- (Brazil) 2025 — (bronze) 3rd place

=== America Cup ===
- 1998 — 5th place
- 1999 — 6th place
- 2000 — 6th place
- 2001 — 5th place
- 2005 — 6th place
- 2007 — did not compete
- 2008 — (bronze) Bronze

=== Bolivarian Games ===
- 1938 — 1st place
- 1965 — 1st place
- 1973 — 1st place
- 1977 — 1st place
- 1985 — 2nd place
- 2001 — 1st place
- 2005 — 1st place
- 2009 — 1st place
- 2013 — 2nd place

=== Pan-American Games ===
- 1971 — 4th place
- 1995 — 4th place
- 2003 — (gold) Gold
- 2007 — 4th place

=== Pan-American Cup ===
- 2010 — 9th place
- 2011 — 6th place
- 2012 — 7th place
- 2014 — 5th place
- 2025 — (gold) Gold

== Current squad ==
The following is the Venezuelan roster in the 2017 World League.

Head coach: Ronald Sarti

No.	Name	Date of birth	Height	Weight	Spike	Block	2016–17 club
1	Régulo Briceño	13 February 1989	1.75 m (5 ft 9 in)	85 kg (187 lb)	332 cm (131 in)	327 cm (129 in)	(Venezuela) Aragua
2	Jhonlen Barreto	14 May 1987	1.85 m (6 ft 1 in)	80 kg (180 lb)	330 cm (130 in)	325 cm (128 in)	
3	Fernando González	30 June 1989	1.94 m (6 ft 4 in)	84 kg (185 lb)	333 cm (131 in)	328 cm (129 in)	(Argentina) Chubut
4	Héctor Mata	27 January 1991	1.79 m (5 ft 10 in)	77 kg (170 lb)	310 cm (120 in)	304 cm (120 in)	(Venezuela) Deportivo Anzoátegui
5	Emerson Rodríguez	2 February 1993	2.04 m (6 ft 8 in)	96 kg (212 lb)	320 cm (130 in)	318 cm (125 in)	(Venezuela) Distrito Capital
6	Carlos Julio Paez	9 November 1991	1.92 m (6 ft 4 in)	82 kg (181 lb)	342 cm (135 in)	337 cm (133 in)	(Venezuela) Industriales de Valencia
7	Edson Valencia	2 December 1987	1.95 m (6 ft 5 in)	92 kg (203 lb)	330 cm (130 in)	325 cm (128 in)	(Venezuela) Huracanes de Bolívar
8	Héctor Salerno	18 June 1991	1.96 m (6 ft 5 in)	76 kg (168 lb)	358 cm (141 in)	351 cm (138 in)	(Venezuela) Aragua
9	José Carrasco (C)	20 May 1989	1.95 m (6 ft 5 in)	89 kg (196 lb)	345 cm (136 in)	347 cm (137 in)	(Venezuela) Yaracuy
11	José Verdi	6 February 1990	1.96 m (6 ft 5 in)	84 kg (185 lb)	350 cm (140 in)	344 cm (135 in)	(Venezuela) Deportivo Anzoátegui
12	Leonard Colina	24 September 1982	0 m (0 in)	0 kg (0 lb)	0 cm (0 in)	0 cm (0 in)	
13	Iván Fernández	6 February 1994	0 m (0 in)	0 kg (0 lb)	0 cm (0 in)	0 cm (0 in)	
14	Máximo Montoya	26 June 1989	1.98 m (6 ft 6 in)	86 kg (190 lb)	347 cm (137 in)	343 cm (135 in)	(Venezuela) Apure
15	Luis Arias	17 January 1989	1.96 m (6 ft 5 in)	87 kg (192 lb)	339 cm (133 in)	333 cm (131 in)	(Venezuela) Asquimo dos Hermanas
16	Roberth Abreu	5 May 1996	2.00 m (6 ft 7 in)	89 kg (196 lb)	340 cm (130 in)	333 cm (131 in)	(Venezuela) Yaracuy
17	Ronald Fayola	20 June 1995	1.98 m (6 ft 6 in)	88 kg (194 lb)	340 cm (130 in)	335 cm (132 in)	(Venezuela) Huracanes de Bolívar
18	Jonathan Quijada	25 September 1995	2.03 m (6 ft 8 in)	82 kg (181 lb)	346 cm (136 in)	341 cm (134 in)	(Venezuela) Aragua
19	Willner Rivas	2 April 1995	1.94 m (6 ft 4 in)	81 kg (179 lb)	339 cm (133 in)	336 cm (132 in)	(Venezuela) Distrito Capital
20	Juan Manuel Vásquez	27 January 1993	1.96 m (6 ft 5 in)	85 kg (187 lb)	355 cm (140 in)	350 cm (140 in)	(Qatar) Al-Shamal
21	Henry José Rojas	5 November 1992	0 m (0 in)	0 kg (0 lb)	0 cm (0 in)	0 cm (0 in)	
22	Armando Velásquez	18 September 1988	0 m (0 in)	0 kg (0 lb)	0 cm (0 in)	0 cm (0 in)	

== Former squads ==
- 2002 FIVB World League — 13th place (tied)
  Jorge Reyes, Manuel Blanco, Andy Rojas, Gustavo Valderrama, Rodman Valera, Carlos Luna, Luis Díaz, Andrés Manzanillo, Héctor Guzmán, Ernardo Gómez (c), José Torres, Ronald Méndez, Thomas Ereu, Iván Márquez, Jorge Silva, Juan Carlos Blanco, and Fredy Cedeño. Head coach: José David Suárez.
- 2002 World Championship — 17th place (tied)
  Carlos Tejeda, Andy Rojas, Gustavo Valderrama, Rodman Valera, Carlos Luna, Luis Díaz, Andrés Manzanillo, Héctor Guzmán, Ronald Méndez, Ernardo Gómez (c), Thomas Ereu, and Fredy Cedeño. Head coach: José David Suárez.
- 2003 FIVB World League — 13th place (tied)
  Héctor Ubina, Luis E. Orta, Andy Rojas, Gustavo Valderrama, Rodman Valera, Carlos Luna, Luis Díaz, Andrés Manzanillo, Héctor Guzmán, Ronald Méndez, Ernardo Gómez (c), Carlos Tejeda, Daniel Mata, Thomas Ereu, Iván Márquez, Jorge Silva, Juan Carlos Blanco, and Fredy Cedeño. Head coach: José David Suarez.
- 2003 Pan American Games — Gold Medal
  Juan Carlos Blanco, Luis Díaz, Thomas Ereu, Ernardo Gómez (c), Carlos Luna, Andrés Manzanillo, Iván Márquez, Ronald Méndez, Andy Rojas, Carlos Tejeda, Gustavo Valderrama, and Rodman Valera.
- 2003 FIVB World Cup — 8th place
  Juan Carlos Blanco, Fredy Cedeño, Luis Díaz, Luis E. Orta, Ernardo Gómez (c), Carlos Luna, Andrés Manzanillo, Iván Márquez, Ronald Méndez, Luis E. Orta, Gustavo Valderrama, and Rodman Valera. Head coach: Miguel Cambero.
- 2005 America's Cup — 6th place
  Deivi Yustiz, Andy Rojas, Gustavo Valderrama, Rodman Valera, Carlos Luna, Luis Díaz, Andrés Manzanillo, Ernardo Gómez, Carlos Tejeda, Iván Márquez, Juan Carlos Blanco, and Fredy Cedeño. Head coach: Argimiro Méndez.
- 2006 World Championship — 17th place (tied)
  Ismel Ramos, Joel Silva, Carlos Luna, Luis Díaz, Renzo Sánchez, Ernardo Gómez, Carlos Tejeda, Iván Márquez, Thomas Ereu, Francisco Soteldo, Juan Carlos Blanco, and Fredy Cedeño. Head coach: Eliseo Ramos.
