= Fernando González (volleyball) =

Venezuelan volleyball player (born 1989)

Personal information
- Nationality: Venezuelan
- Born: 30 June 1989 (age 37)
- Height: 1.94 m (6 ft 4 in)
- Weight: 84 kg (185 lb)
- Spike: 333 cm (131 in)
- Block: 328 cm (129 in)

Volleyball information
- Number: 3

Career
Years	Teams
2014-2015	Chubut Voley

National team
2014-2015	Venezuela
Honours
Representing Venezuela
South American Championship
Silver medal – second place	2017 Santiago/Temuco

Fernando González (born 30 June 1989) is a Venezuelan male volleyball player. He was part of the Venezuela men's national volleyball team at the 2014 FIVB Volleyball Men's World Championship in Poland. He played with Chubut Voley.

== Clubs ==
- (Argentina) Chubut Voley (2014)
