= 1977 Men's South American Volleyball Championship =

The 1977 Men's South American Volleyball Championship, the 12th tournament, took place in 1977 in Lima (Peru).

== Final positions ==
Place	Team
	Brazil
	Venezuela
	Argentina
4	Peru
5	Paraguay
6	Bolivia
7	Ecuador
