= Valderrama (surname) =

Valderrama is a Spanish surname. Notable people with the surname include:

- Andrea Valderrama, American politician
- Carlos Valderrama (footballer), Colombian football player
- Carlos Valderrama (baseball), Venezuelan baseball player
- Gustavo Valderrama (born 1977), Venezuelan volleyball player
- Juan Valderrama, Spanish singer
- Wilmer Valderrama, American actor
- Eugeni Valderrama (born 1994), Spanish football player
