= Paraguayan Volleyball Federation =

Sports governing body in Paraguay

- Sport: Volleyball
- Jurisdiction: Paraguay
- Abbreviation: FPV
- Founded: 1943; 83 years ago
- Affiliation: FIVB; CSV
- Headquarters: Asunción, Paraguay
- President: Bruno Zubizarreta
- (Paraguay)

The Paraguayan Volleyball Federation (Spanish: Federación Paraguaya de Voleibol (FPV)), founded on January 31, 1943, is the body which governs the sport of volleyball in Paraguay. It is registered in the International Volleyball Federation and the South American Volleyball Confederation. It is the entity in charge of organizing indoor volleyball and beach volleyball in the country, integrating sports clubs, athletes, referees and coaches.

== Sports specialties ==
- Indoor volleyball
- Beach volleyball

== See also ==
- Paraguay men's national volleyball team
- Paraguay women's national volleyball team
