= Gustavo Endres =

Brazilian volleyball player (born 1975)

Personal information
- Full name: Gustavo Endres
- Born: 23 August 1975 (age 51); Passo Fundo, Brazil
- Height: 2.03 m (6 ft 8 in)
- Weight: 98 kg (216 lb)
- Spike: 337 cm (133 in)
- Block: 325 cm (128 in)

Coaching information
- Current team: APAV Canoas

Volleyball information
- Position: Middle blocker
- Current team: Retired

Career
Years	Teams
1996–2001	EC Banespa
2001–2003	4Torri Ferrara
2003–2004	Andreoli Latina
2004–2009	Sisley Treviso
2009–2011	EC Pinheiros
2011–2012	Floripa Esporte Clube
2012–2015	APAV Canoas

National team
1997–2011	Brazil
Honours
Men's volleyball
Representing Brazil
Event	1st	2nd	3rd
Olympic Games	1	1	0
World Championship	2	0	0
World Cup	2	0	1
World Grand Champions Cup	2	1	0
World League	6	1	2
Pan American Games	2	0	1
South American Championship	2	0	0
Total	17	3	3
Olympic Games
Gold medal – first place	2004 Athens	
Silver medal – second place	2008 Beijing	
World Championship
Gold medal – first place	2002 Argentina	
Gold medal – first place	2006 Japan	
World Cup
Gold medal – first place	2003 Japan	
Gold medal – first place	2007 Japan	
Bronze medal – third place	2011 Japan	
World Grand Champions Cup
Gold medal – first place	1997 Japan	
Gold medal – first place	2005 Japan	
Silver medal – second place	2001 Japan	
World League
Gold medal – first place	2001 Katowice	
Gold medal – first place	2004 Rome	
Gold medal – first place	2005 Belgrade	
Gold medal – first place	2006 Moscow	
Gold medal – first place	2007 Katowice	
Silver medal – second place	2002 Belo Horizonte	
Bronze medal – third place	1999 Mar del Plata	
Bronze medal – third place	2000 Rotterdam	
Pan American Games
Gold medal – first place	2007 Rio de Janeiro	
Gold medal – first place	2011 Guadalajara	
Bronze medal – third place	2003 Santo Domingo	
South American Championship
Gold medal – first place	2005 Lages	
Gold medal – first place	2007 Santiago	
- Last updated: 9 January 2016

Gustavo Endres (born 23 August 1975) is a Brazilian former volleyball player who was a member of the Brazilian national volleyball team from 1997 to 2008. He was a gold medalist in the 2004 Olympics, a silver medalist of the 2008 Olympics, World Champion (2002, 2006), and a multimedalist of the World League, South American Championship, World Cup, and the Grand Champions Cup. Endres was selected as the best blocker in the World Championship 2002 and 2008 Olympic Games.

== Career ==
=== National team ===
Endres won Olympic gold medal in the 2004 Olympics. Endres was a middle blocker and won the World Championships twice (2002 and 2006), and the World League five times (2001, 2004, 2005, 2006 and 2007). Endres retired from the national team after winning the silver medal in the 2008 Olympics.

== Personal life ==
Endres was born in Passo Fundo, Rio Grande do Sul, Brazil. His younger brother Murilo is also a volleyball player. He is married to Rachel and they have two sons, Enzo and Eric, who also play volleyball. He is the brother-in-law of the Brazilian volleyball player Jaqueline Carvalho.

== Awards ==
=== Individuals ===
- 2001 FIVB World League "Best Blocker"
- 2001 America Cup "Best Server"
- 2002 FIVB World Championship "Best Blocker"
- 2003 Pan American Games "Best Blocker"
- 2006 CEV Champions League "Best Blocker"
- 2006 Italian League "Best Blocker"
- 2007 FIVB World League "Best Blocker"
- 2008 Olympic Games "Best Blocker"
