= Thomas Ereu =

Venezuelan volleyball player (born 1979)

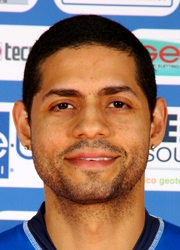
- Thomas Ereu (Legavolley 2011

Personal information
- Born: October 25, 1979 (age 47); Acarigua, Venezuela
- Height: 1.93 m (6 ft 4 in)
- Weight: 86 kg (190 lb)
- Spike: 340 cm (134 in)
- Block: 335 cm (132 in)

Volleyball information
- Current club: CAI Teruel

Career
Years	Teams
2002–03; 2003–05; 2005–07; 2009; 2010; 2010–11; 2011–12; 2012–13; 2013–	Tenerife Sur; PTV Málaga; Salento d'Amare Taviano; Aran Cucine Abruzzo; Iraklis Thessaloniki; Energy Resources Carilo; Carige Genova; Vikingos de Miranda; CAI Teruel
Honours
Men's volleyball
Representing Venezuela
Pan American Games
Gold medal – first place	2003 Santo Domingo	Team

Thomas Ereú (born October 25, 1979, in Acarigua) is a volleyball player from Venezuela, who won the gold medal with the men's national team at the 2003 Pan American Games in Santo Domingo, Dominican Republic. In the final Ereu's team defeated Cuba 3–0 (25–23, 25–18, 25–20).
