= 1969 Men's South American Volleyball Championship =

The 1969 Men's South American Volleyball Championship, the 8th tournament, took place in 1969 in Caracas (Venezuela).

== Final positions ==
Place	Team
	Brazil
	Venezuela
	Uruguay
4	Chile
5	Argentina
6	Colombia
7	Ecuador
8	Guyana
