= 2005 Men's South American Volleyball Championship =

The 2005 Men's South American Volleyball Championship was the 26th edition of the event, organised by South America's governing volleyball body, the Confederación Sudamericana de Voleibol (CSV). It was hosted in Ginasio Jones Minosso in Lages, Brazil from September 14 to September 18, 2005.

This event featured six teams competing in a round-robin format, where each team played against every other team in the tournament. At the end of the round-robin format, the team with the highest number of points won the championship.

== Competing nations ==
The following national teams participated:

- Argentina
- Brazil (Hosts)
- Chile
- Colombia
- Paraguay
- Venezuela

== Pool standing procedure ==
1. Number of matches won
2. Number of matches lost
3. Match points
4. Won Sets
5. Lost Sets

Match won 3–0 or 3–1: 3 match points for the winner, 0 match points for the loser
Match won 3–2: 2 match points for the winner, 1 match point for the loser

== Preliminary round robin ==
- Wednesday 2005-09-14

Venezuela	3–2	Paraguay	(25-20 23-25 25-19 24-26 17-15)
Argentina	3–0	Chile	(25-16 25-23 25-22)
Brazil	3–0	Colombia	(25-17 25-19 25-14)

- Thursday 2005-09-15

Argentina	3–0	Colombia	(25-22 25-21 25-15)
Venezuela	3–0	Chile	(25-22 25-19 25-16)
Brazil	3–0	Paraguay	(25-16 25-12 25-17)

- Friday 2005-09-16

Colombia	2–3	Venezuela	(26-24 24-26 25-18 22-25 13-15)
Chile	3–2	Paraguay	(17-25 19-25 25-16 25-19 15-13)
Brazil	3–0	Argentina	(25-12 25-22 25-22)

- Saturday 2005-09-17

Colombia	3–1	Paraguay	(25-19 25- 9 13-25 26-24)
Brazil	3–0	Chile	(25- 9 25-18 25-17)
Argentina	3–1	Venezuela	(27-25 26-24 25-27 25-22)

- Sunday 2005-09-18

Colombia	3–2	Chile	(25-16 20-25 25-23 20-25 15-13)
Argentina	3–0	Paraguay	(25-18 25-23 25-21)
Brazil	3–1	Venezuela	(25-20 25-15 23-25 25-14)

== Final ranking ==
Rank	Team
1st place, gold medalist(s)	Brazil
2nd place, silver medalist(s)	Argentina
3rd place, bronze medalist(s)	Venezuela
4.	Colombia
5.	Chile
6.	Paraguay

2005 Men's South American champions

Brazil
25th title
