= 1958 Men's South American Volleyball Championship =

The 1958 Men's South American Volleyball Championship, was the 3rd edition of South American Men's Volleyball Championship, took place in 1958 in Porto Alegre (Brazil).

== Final positions ==
Place	Team
	Brazil
	Paraguay
	Uruguay
4	Argentina
5	Chile

Source: Todor66.com
