= Andrés Manzanillo =

Venezuelan volleyball player (born 1977)

Personal information
- Born: August 1, 1977 (age 49)
Honours
Men's volleyball
Representing Venezuela
Pan American Games
Gold medal – first place	2003 Santo Domingo	Team

Andrés Manzanillo (born August 1, 1977) is a volleyball player from Venezuela, who won the gold medal with the men's national team at the 2003 Pan American Games in Santo Domingo, Dominican Republic. In the final Manzanillo's team defeated Cuba 3-0 (25-23, 25–18, 25–20).

He won with his team the gold medal at the 2005 Bolivarian Games.

== Awards ==
=== National team ===
- 2005 Bolivarian Games, - Gold Medal
