= Carlos Tejeda =

Venezuelan volleyball player (born 1980)

Personal information
- Full name: Carlos Arturo Tejeda Rivera
- Born: 29 July 1980 (age 46); Distrito Capital, Caracas, Venezuela
- Height: 198 cm (6 ft 6 in)
- Weight: 98 kg (216 lb)
- Spike: 365 cm (144 in)
- Block: 348 cm (137 in)

Career
| Years | Teams |
|---|---|
| 2000–2001 | Obras Sanitarias |
| 2001–2002 | Obras Sanitarias |
| 2003–2004 | Intempo Abanilla |
| 2006–2007 | Reima Crema |
| 2007 | AEK Athens |
| 2008 | Al Arabic |
| 2008–2009 | Maliye Millipiango |
| 2009–2010 | LIG |
| 2010–2011 | Al Rayan |
| 2011–2012 | Havash Gombad |
| 2013 | Najama |
| 2014–2015 | Zahra |
| 2016 | Obras UDAP San Juan |
| 2017 | Linares |
| 2017–2018 | Jordan |
| 2018–2019 | Jordan |

National team
| 2000–2010 | Venezuela |
Honours
Men's volleyball
Representing Venezuela
Pan American Games
| Gold medal – first place | 2003 Santo Domingo | Team --> |

Carlos Arturo Tejeda Rivera (born July 29, 1980) is a volleyball player from Venezuela, who won the gold medal with the men's national team at the 2003 Pan American Games in Santo Domingo, Dominican Republic playing as a wing-spiker. In the final his team defeated Cuba 3-0 (25-23, 25–18, 25-20).

He won with his team the gold medal at the 2005 Bolivarian Games.

He was born in Distrito Capita, Caracas, Venezuela.

== Awards ==
=== National team ===
- Junior World Championship 1999 Thailand 4 Places

==== Senior team ====
- American Cup Brazil 2000 5 Places
- Olympic Qualifiers Portugal 2000 3 Places
- World League 2002 Italy Poland Russia Venezuela
- 2005 Bolivarian Games, - Gold Medal
- World Championship 2002 Argentina 9 Places
- Center American and Caribbeans Games El Salvador 2002 3 Places
- World League Greece Poland Russia Venezuela 2003
- Pan Americans Games Dominican Republic 2003 Gold Medal
- Olympic Qualifiers Portugal 2004 4 Places
- American Cup Brazil 2005 5 Places
- World League Brazil Japan Portugal Venezuela 2005
- 2005 Bolivarian Games, - Gold Medal
- World Championship Japan 2006
- Pan Americans Games Brazil 2007 4 Places
- Olympic Qualifiers Argentina 2008 1 Places
- Olympic Games Beijing China 2008 9 Places
- Center American and Caribbeans Games Puerto Rico 2010 2 Places
- World Championship Italy 2010 12 Places

=== Foreign Leagues ===
- Obras Sanitarias San Juan Argentina 2000 - 2001
- Obras Sanitarias San Juan Argentina 2001 - 2002
- Intempo Abanilla Spain 2003 - 2004
- Unicaja Almeria Spain 2005 - 2006
- Champions League Unicaja Almeria Spain Greece Belgium Netherlands Austria 2006
- Reima Crema Italy 2006 - 2007
- AEK Athens Greece 2007
- Al Arabic Qatar 2008
- Maliye Millipiango Turkey 2008 - 2009
- LIG South Korea 2009 - 2010
- Al Rayan Qatar 2010 - 2011
- Havash Gombad Iran 2011 - 2012
- Najama Bahrain 2013
- Zahra Lebanon 2014 - 2015
- Obras UDAP San Juan Argentina 2016
- Linares Chile 2017
- Wady Musa Jordan 2017 - 2018
- Wady Musa Jordan 2018 - 2019
