= 1979 Men's South American Volleyball Championship =

The 1979 Men's South American Volleyball Championship, the 13th tournament, took place in 1979 in Rosario (Argentina).

== Final positions ==
Place	Team
	Brazil
	Venezuela
	Paraguay
4	Chile
5	Argentina
6	Peru
7	Uruguay

Source: Todor66.com
