= José David Suárez =

Cuban volleyball player (1953–2019)

Personal information
- Full name: José David Suárez Pérez
- Born: 26 June 1953; Cienfuegos, Cuba
- Died: 23 May 2019 (aged 65)
- Height: 1.86 m (6 ft 1 in)

Volleyball information
- Number: 12

National team
1978-1980	Cuba
Honours
Men's volleyball
Representing Cuba
World Championship
Bronze medal – third place	1978 Italy
Central American and Caribbean Games
Gold medal – first place	1978 Medellín	Team

José David Suárez (26 June 1953 – 23 May 2019) was a Cuban volleyball player. He competed in the men's tournament at the 1980 Summer Olympics. He also won a bronze medal with the Cuban team at the 1978 FIVB World Championship.
