= 1985 Men's South American Volleyball Championship =

Season of the South American Men's Volleyball Championship

The 1985 Men's South American Volleyball Championship, the 16th such championship, took place in 1985 in Caracas (Venezuela).

== Final positions ==
Place	Team
	Brazil
	Venezuela
	Argentina
4	Uruguay

Source: Todor66.com
