= LIG =

LIG may refer to:

- LIG Defense & Aerospace, South Korean aerospace manufacturer and arms manufacturer
- Laboratoire d'Informatique de Grenoble, French computer science research laboratory
- IATA airport code of Limoges–Bellegarde Airport
- DS100 code of Ilsenburg station
