= Brett Youngberg =

Canadian volleyball player (born 1979)

Brett Youngberg (born September 15, 1979 in White Rock, British Columbia) is a male volleyball player from Canada, who competed for the Men's National Team as a middle/centre hitter. He was a member of the national squad who ended up in seventh place at the 2007 Pan American Games in Rio de Janeiro.
