= Juan Carlos Blanco (volleyball) =

Venezuelan volleyball player (born 1981)

Personal information
- Born: July 27, 1981 (age 45); Guatire, Venezuela
Honours
Men's volleyball
Representing Venezuela
Pan American Games
Gold medal – first place	2003 Santo Domingo	Team

Juan Carlos Blanco (born July 27, 1981) is a volleyball setter from Venezuela, who won the gold medal with the men's national team at the 2003 Pan American Games in Santo Domingo, Dominican Republic. In the final his team defeated Cuba 3–0 (25–23, 25–18, 25–20).

He won with his team the gold medal at the 2005 Bolivarian Games.

== Awards ==
=== National team ===
==== Senior team ====
- 2005 Bolivarian Games, - Gold Medal
