= Gustavo Valderrama =

Venezuelan volleyball player (born 1977)

Gustavo

Personal information
- Full name: Gustavo Enrique Valderrama Rivas
- Nickname: Valderrama
- Nationality: Venezolana - Española
- Born: July 31, 1977 (age 49); Zulia State, Venezuela
Honours
Men's volleyball
Representing Venezuela
Pan American Games
Gold medal – first place	2003 Santo Domingo	Team

Gustavo Valderrama (born July 31, 1977, in Zulia State) is a volleyball player from Venezuela, who won the gold medal with the men's national team at the 2003 Pan American Games in Santo Domingo, Dominican Republic. In the final Valderrama's team defeated Cuba 3-0 (25-23, 25–18, 25–20). Valderrama was named best digger and receiver at the 2004 Olympic Qualifying Tournament in Porto, Portugal, where Venezuela ended up in second place behind Poland.

He won with his team the gold medal at the 2005 Bolivarian Games.

== Awards ==
=== National team ===
==== Senior team ====
- 2005 Bolivarian Games – Gold Medal
