= 1987 Men's South American Volleyball Championship =

The 1987 Men's South American Volleyball Championship brought together national volleyball teams from South America. It was organized by the South American Volleyball Confederation (CSV).

== Final positions ==
Place	Team
	Brazil
	Argentina
	Venezuela
4	Paraguay
