= 1997 Men's South American Volleyball Championship =

The 1997 Men's South American Volleyball Championship, took place in 1997 in Caracas (Venezuela).

== Final positions ==
Place	Team
	Brazil
	Venezuela
	Argentina
4	Peru
5	Colombia
6	Chile
7	Paraguay
8	Ecuador
9	Uruguay
10	Guyana
