= Iván Márquez (volleyball) =

Venezuelan volleyball player (born 1981)

Personal information
- Full name: Iván Ilitch Márquez Sánchez
- Born: October 4, 1981 (age 45); Caracas, Venezuela
- Hometown: Caracas
- Height: 2.05 m (6 ft 9 in)
- Weight: 88 kg (194 lb)
- Spike: 372 cm (146 in)
- Block: 367 cm (144 in)

Volleyball information
- Position: Outside hitter
- Current club: PAOK
- Number: 13

Career
Years	Teams
2002–2003; 2003–2004; 2004–2007; 2007–2009; 2009–2010; 2010; 2010–2011; 2011; 2011–2012; 2012–2013; 2013–2014; 2014–2015; 2015–2016; 2016–2017; 2017–2018; 2018–	(Argentina) Bolívar Signia (Spain) Pórtol-Son Amar (Belgium) Knack Roeselare (Greece) Olympiacos (Italy) Tonno Vibo Valentia (France) Tourcoing (Italy) Pallavolo Pineto (Venezuela) Caracas (Argentina) Resistencia (Argentina) Buenos Aires Unidos (Venezuela) Miranda (Brazil) Maringa (Romania) Arcada Galati (Argentina) Deportivo Moron (Portugal) Sporting CP (Greece) PAOK

National team
2001–2015	Venezuela
Honours
Men's volleyball
Representing Venezuela
Pan American Games
Gold medal – first place	2003 Santo Domingo	Team
- Last updated: January 2018

Iván Márquez (born October 4, 1981, in Caracas) is a Venezuelan professional and olympic volleyball player. His position on the field is middle blocker. He currently plays in the Greek Volley League for PAOK Thessaloniki. He also currently coaches for a league called Miami Volleyball Academy in Miami, Florida

== Career ==
He played for the Greek team Olympiacos SC, and for the national team of Venezuela.

Before going to Olympiacos, Márquez was playing for Knack Randstad Roeselare in Belgium. Márquez is known for his very hard serve and spike through the middle, hence his nickname Bomba.

Márquez only started playing volleyball at a late age, as he was denied permission by his country to play basketball in the United States of America.

Márquez is the first son of Iván Márquez Sr. and the only child of Kais Sánchez. He is married to Gabriela Torrealba de Marquez since 28 October 2006 and has two children.

He won with his team the gold medal at the 2005 Bolivarian Games. Rebeca Perez is his favorite club player

Played the 2006 Fivb World Championship in Japan where his national team occupied the 17th position. After that his biggest desire of going to the Olympic Games in Beijing 2008 came true when Venezuela beat in his final qualification game Argentina by 3-1 and accomplish the most expected dream of his career.

A year later, Marquez moved to the Italian league and signed with Vibo Valentia Tonno Callipo. Following his start, he was selected to participate in the All-Star Game, where his team defeated the Italian National Team 3–1.

After passing quickly for the French league he returned to Italy where he defends the club of Pineto, but due to injury he has to take an intervention to repair his quadriceps tendon. He returned to the court a few months later to assist one more time to the Panamerican Games in Guadalajara, Mexico (2011) and yet come back to play another season in the Argentinian League with the Club Sarmiento Santana Textiles in Resistencia.

In 2017, he signed a contract with Sporting CP with whom he won the Portuguese Championship. He was signed to PAOK V.C. for the season 2018-2019

== Awards ==
=== Individuals ===
- 2010 Central American and Caribbean Games "Best server"
- 2011-2012 Argentinian League "Best spiker"

=== National team ===
- 2005 Bolivarian Games, - Gold Medal

=== Clubs ===
- 2003 Argentine League – Champion, with Bolívar Signia
- 2005 Belgium League – Champion, with Knack Roeselaere
- 2005 Belgium Cup – Champion, with Knack Roeselaere
- 2006 Belgium League – Champion, with Knack Roeselaere
- 2006 Belgium Cup – Champion, with Knack Roeselaere
- 2007 Belgium League – Champion, with Knack Roeselaere
- 2009 Greek League – Champion, with Olympiakos Piraeus
- 2009 Greek Cup – Champion, with Olympiakos Piraeus
- 2018 Portuguese Volleyball First Division - Champion, with Sporting CP
