= Rodman Valera =

Venezuelan volleyball player (born 1982)

Personal information
- Full name: Rodman José Valera Capon
- Born: April 20, 1982 (age 44); Caracas, Venezuela
Honours
Men's volleyball
Representing Venezuela
Pan American Games
Gold medal – first place	2003 Santo Domingo	Team

Rodman José Valera Capon (born April 20, 1982 in Caracas) is a volleyball player from Venezuela. He won the gold medal with the men's national team at the 2003 Pan American Games in Santo Domingo, Dominican Republic. In the final Valera's team defeated Cuba 3-0 (25-23, 25–18, 25-20).

He won with his team the gold medal at the 2005 Bolivarian Games.

== Awards ==
=== National team ===
==== Senior team ====
- 2005 Bolivarian Games, - Gold Medal
