= Luis Díaz (volleyball) =

Venezuelan volleyball player (born 1983)

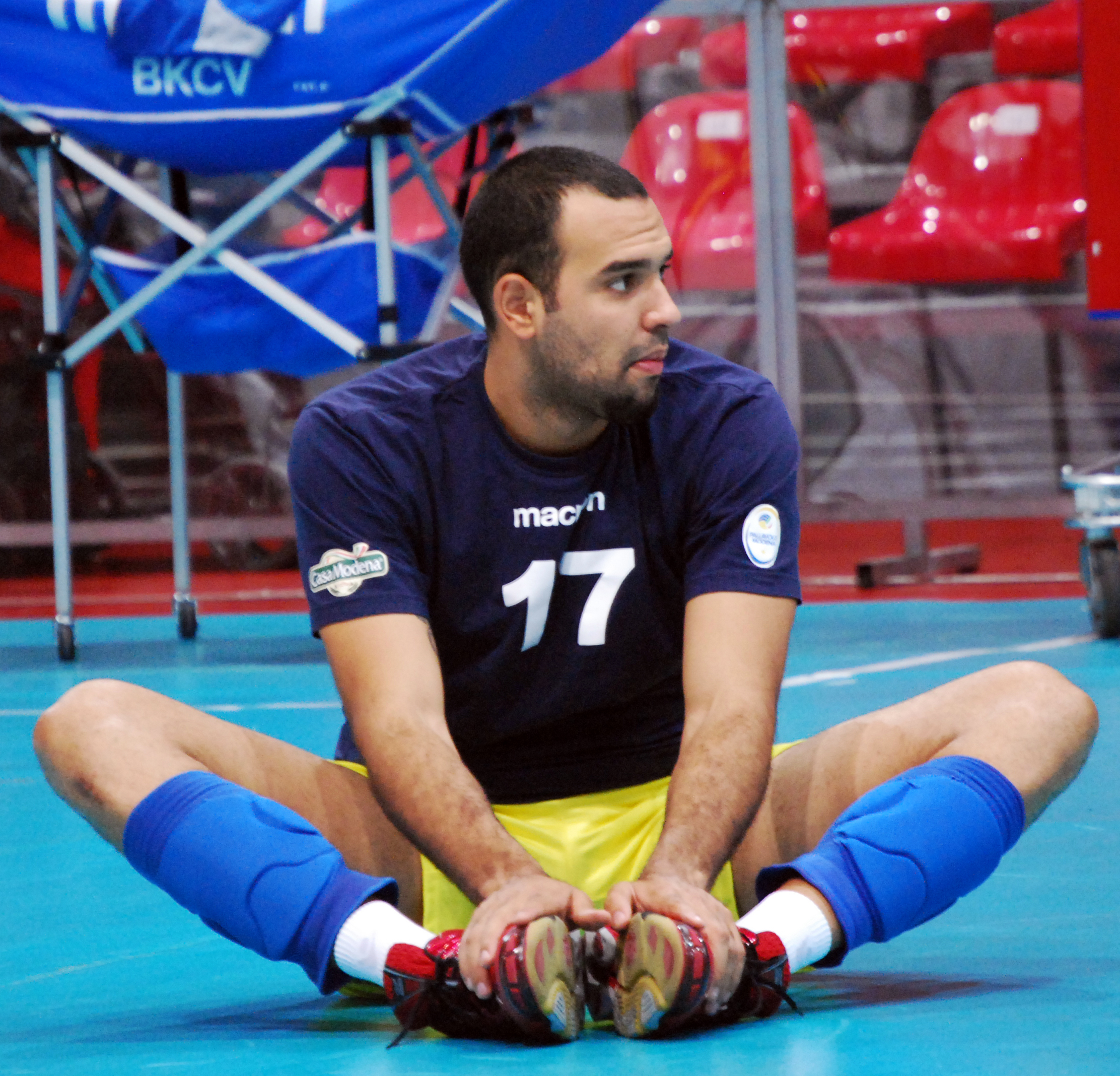
- Díazñ in 2010

Personal information
- Full name: Luis Augusto Díaz Mayorca
- Born: August 20, 1983 (age 43); Maracay, Aragua, Venezuela
Honours
Men's volleyball
Representing Venezuela
Pan American Games
| Gold medal – first place | 2003 Santo Domingo | Team |

Luis Augusto Díaz Mayorca (born August 20, 1983) is a volleyball player from Venezuela, who won the gold medal with the men's national team at the 2003 Pan American Games in Santo Domingo, Dominican Republic. In the final his team defeated Cuba 3–0 (25–23, 25–18, 25–20).

He won with his team the gold medal at the 2005 Bolivarian Games.

He was born in Maracay, Aragua, Venezuela.

== Awards ==
=== National team ===
- 2005 Bolivarian Games, - Gold Medal
