= 1981 Men's South American Volleyball Championship =

The 14th Men's South American Volleyball Championship was held in Santiago, Chile, in 1981.

== Final positions ==
Place	Team
	Brazil
	Argentina
	Chile
4	Venezuela
5	Uruguay
6	Paraguay

Source: Todor66.com
