= Michael Munday (volleyball) =

Canadian volleyball player (born 1980)

Michael ("Mike") Munday (born October 14, 1980, in Winnipeg) is a male volleyball player from Canada, who competed for the Men's National Team as a setter. He was a member of the national squad who ended up in seventh place at the 2007 Pan American Games in Rio de Janeiro.
