= 2003 Men's South American Volleyball Championship =

The 2003 Men's South American Volleyball Championship was the 25th edition of the event, organised by South America's governing volleyball body, the Confederación Sudamericana de Voleibol (CSV). It was hosted in Rio de Janeiro, Brazil from September 2 to September 6, 2003.

This event featured five teams competing in a round-robin format, where each team played against every other team in the tournament. At the end of the round-robin format, the team with the highest number of points won the championship. The winners (Brazil) and runners-up (Venezuela) qualified for the 2003 FIVB Volleyball Men's World Cup in Japan.

== Competing nations ==
The following national teams participated:

- Argentina
- Brazil (Hosts)
- Chile
- Paraguay
- Venezuela

== Pool standing procedure ==
1. Number of matches won
2. Number of matches lost
3. Match points
4. Won Sets
5. Lost Sets

Match won 3–0 or 3–1: 3 match points for the winner, 0 match points for the loser
Match won 3–2: 2 match points for the winner, 1 match point for the loser

== Preliminary round robin ==
- Tuesday 2003-09-02

Venezuela	3–1	Argentina	(19-25 25-20 25-19 25-19)
Brazil	3–0	Chile	(25-15 25-11 25-13)

- Wednesday 2003-09-03

Venezuela	3–0	Chile	(25-17 25-20 25-15)
Brazil	3–0	Paraguay	(25-9 25-9 25-13)

- Thursday 2003-09-04

Chile	3–0	Paraguay	(25-20 25-18 25-23)
Brazil	3–0	Argentina	(25-20 25-15 25-19)

- Friday 2003-09-05

Argentina	3–0	Chile	(25-17 25-17 25-14)
Venezuela	3–0	Paraguay	(25-5 25-18 25-14)

- Saturday 2003-09-06

Argentina	3–0	Paraguay	(25-17 25-13 25-21)
Venezuela	0–3	Brazil	(22-25 24-26 22-25)

== Final ranking ==
Rank	Team
1st place, gold medalist(s)	Brazil
2nd place, silver medalist(s)	Venezuela
3rd place, bronze medalist(s)	Argentina
4.	Chile
5.	Paraguay

2003 Men's South American champions

Brazil
24th title
