= 1973 Men's South American Volleyball Championship =

The 1973 Men's South American Volleyball Championship, the 10th tournament, took place in 1973 in Bucaramanga (Colombia).

== Final positions ==
Place	Team
	Brazil
	Argentina
	Venezuela
4	Chile
5	Colombia
