= 2001 Men's South American Volleyball Championship =

The 2001 Men's South American Volleyball Championship was the 24th edition of the event, organised by South America's governing volleyball body, the Confederación Sudamericana de Voleibol (CSV). It was hosted in Cali, Colombia from September 6 to September 8, 2001.

== Preliminary round robin ==
- Thursday 2001-09-06

Brazil	3–0	Venezuela	(25-14 25-18 25-15)
Argentina	3–0	Colombia	(25-21 25-21 25-21)

- Friday 2001-09-07

Argentina	3–0	Venezuela	(25-17 25-20 25-17)
Brazil	3–0	Colombia	(25-15 25-12 25-16)

- Saturday 2001-09-08

Brazil	3–0	Argentina	(25-21 25-19 25-16)
Venezuela	3–0	Colombia	(25-23 25-23 25-21)

=== Final standings ===
	Team	Points	G	W	L	PW	PL	Ratio	SW	SL	Ratio
1.	Brazil	6	3	3	0	225	146	1.541	9	0	MAX
2.	Argentina	5	3	2	1	206	192	1.073	6	3	2.000
3.	Venezuela	4	3	1	2	176	217	0.811	3	6	0.500
4.	Colombia	3	3	0	3	173	225	0.769	0	9	0.000

== Final ranking ==
Place	Team
1.	Brazil
2.	Argentina
3.	Venezuela
4.	Colombia

2001 Men's South American champions

Brazil
23rd title
