= Andy Rojas (volleyball) =

Venezuelan volleyball player (born 1977)

Personal information
- Full name: Andy Agustin Rojas Guevara
- Born: 2 October 1977 (age 49); Caracas, Venezuela
- Height: 1.97 m (6 ft 6 in)
- Weight: 95 kg (209 lb)
- Spike: 315 cm (124 in)
- Block: 318 cm (125 in)

Career
Years	Teams
2000-01; 2008–2009	(Greece) Olympiacos S.C. (Ukraine) Lokomotyv Kharkiv

National team
Venezuela
Honours
Men's volleyball
Representing Venezuela
Pan American Games
Gold medal – first place	2003 Santo Domingo	Team

Andy Agustin Rojas Guevara (born 2 October 1977) is a Venezuelan retired male volleyball player. He was part of the Venezuela men's national volleyball team. He competed with the national team at the 2008 Summer Olympics in Beijing, China. He played for Olympiacos in 2000–2001. He was born in Caracas, Venezuela.

== Clubs ==
- (Greece) Olympiacos S.C. (2000–01)

== See also ==
- Venezuela at the 2008 Summer Olympics
