= 1999 Men's South American Volleyball Championship =

The 1999 Men's South American Volleyball Championship was the 23rd edition of the event, organised by South America's governing volleyball body, the Confederación Sudamericana de Voleibol (CSV). The final round was hosted in Córdoba, Argentina from September 7 to September 11, 1999. Brazil and hosts Argentina were automatically qualified, Venezuela and Uruguay each won their preliminary round.

== Overview ==
- Edition: 23rd
- Organizer: Confederación Sudamericana de Voleibol (CSV)
- Location: Córdoba, Argentina
- Dates: September 7 to September 11, 1999

== Teams and Qualification ==
- Automatically Qualified:
  - Brazil
  - Argentina (Hosts)
- Preliminary Round Winners:
  - Venezuela
  - Uruguay

== Preliminary round robin ==
- Thursday 1999-09-07

Argentina	3–0	Uruguay	(25-19 25-9 25-14)
Brazil	3–1	Venezuela	(27-25 20-25 25-12 27-25)

- Friday 1999-09-08

Brazil	3–0	Uruguay	(25-11 25-12 25-6)
Argentina	3–2	Venezuela	(20-25 25-19 27-25 21-25 15-8)

- Saturday 1999-09-09

Venezuela	3–0	Uruguay	(25-18 25-16 25-22)
Argentina	0–3	Brazil	(18-25 22-25 27-29)

=== Final standings ===
	Team	Points	G	W	L	PW	PL	R atio	SW	SL	Ratio
1.	Brazil	6	3	3	0	253	183	1.383	9	1	9.000
2.	Argentina	5	3	2	1	250	223	1.121	6	5	1.200
3.	Venezuela	4	3	1	2	264	263	1.004	6	6	1.000
4.	Uruguay	3	3	0	3	127	225	0.564	0	9	0.000

== Finals ==
- Sunday 1999-09-11

Venezuela	3–0	Uruguay	(25-18 25-21 25-17)
Brazil	3–1	Argentina	(25-16 25-17 22-25 25-17)

== Final ranking ==
Place	Team
1.	Brazil
2.	Argentina
3.	Venezuela
4.	Uruguay

1999 Men's South American champions

Brazil
22nd title

== Individual awards ==
=== References ===
- Results
