= Carlos Luna (volleyball) =

Venezuelan volleyball player (born 1981)

Personal information
- Born: 25 January 1981 (age 44); La Villa del Rosario, Zulia, Venezuela

Sport
- Sport: Volleyball

Carlos Luna (born 25 January 1981) is a Venezuelan former volleyball player. He competed in the men's tournament at the 2008 Summer Olympics.
