= Freddy Cedeño =

Venezuelan volleyball player (born 1981)

Personal information
- Born: 10 September 1981 (age 44) Caracas, Venezuela

Sport
- Sport: Volleyball

Freddy Cedeño (born 10 September 1981) is a Venezuelan volleyball player. He competed in the men's tournament at the 2008 Summer Olympics.
