= 1995 Men's South American Volleyball Championship =

The 1995 Men's South American Volleyball Championship took place in 1995 in Porto Alegre, Brazil.

== Final positions ==
Place	Team
	Brazil
	Argentina
	Venezuela
4	Chile

Source: Todor66.com
