= Volleyball at the 2005 Bolivarian Games =

2005 Bolivarian Games
Tournament details
- Host country: Colombia
- Dates: August 13 to 18, 2005
- Teams: 8 (4 men, 4 women)
- Venue: Mayor Coliseum (in Pereira host cities)

The volleyball (Spanish:Voleibol) tournaments for the 2005 Bolivarian Games was held from August 13 to 18, 2005 at the Mayor Coliseum in Pereira, Colombia.

== Participating teams ==
Men

Bolivia
Colombia
Ecuador
Venezuela

Women

Colombia
Ecuador
Peru
Venezuela

== Medal table ==
Key:

* Host nation (Colombia)

Rank	Nation	Gold	Silver	Bronze	Total
1	Venezuela (VEN)	1	1	0	2
2	Peru (PER)	1	0	0	1
3	Colombia (COL)*	0	1	1	2
4	Bolivia (BOL)	0	0	1	1
Totals (4 entries)		2	2	2	6

=== Medalists ===
Event	Gold	Silver	Bronze
Men	Venezuela	Colombia	Bolivia
Women	Peru	Venezuela	Colombia
