= Uruguay men's national volleyball team =

National sports team

Uruguay
- Association: Federación Uruguaya de Voleibol
- Confederation: CSV
- Head coach: Martín Alonso
- FIVB ranking: NR (1 October 2026)

Uniforms
Home	Away
- www.uruvoley.com.uy (in Spanish)
Honours
South American Championship
Silver medal – second place	1951	Rio de Janeiro
Silver medal – second place	1956	Montevideo
Silver medal – second place	1971	Montevideo
Bronze medal – third place	1958	Porto Alegre
Bronze medal – third place	1964	Buenos Aires
Bronze medal – third place	1969	Caracas

The Uruguay men's national volleyball team represents Uruguay in international volleyball competitions and friendly matches. In the 1950s the squad twice won a silver medal (1951 and 1956) at the South American Championship. The dominant forces in men's volleyball on the South American continent are Brazil and Argentina.
