= Paraguay men's national volleyball team =

National sports team

Paraguay
- Association: Federación Paraguaya de Voleibol
- Confederation: CSV
- Head coach: Marcos Pavía
- FIVB ranking: NR (1 October 2026)

Uniforms
Home	Away
Honours
South American Championship
Bronze medal – third place	1979	Rosario
Silver medal – second place	1958	Porto Alegre
Bronze medal – third place	1956	Montevideo

The Paraguay men's national volleyball team represents Paraguay in international volleyball competitions. In the 1950s the squad twice won a medal (silver and bronze) at the South American Championship, and won another bronze medal in 1979 in Rosario, Argentina.

== Tournament Records ==
=== FIVB World Championship ===
- 1960 - 12th place

=== Pan American Games ===
- 2031 - Qualified as host

=== South American Volleyball Championship ===
- 1958 - 2nd place

== See also ==
- Paraguay women's national volleyball team
