= Volleyball at the 1968 Summer Olympics – Men's team rosters =

Olympic volleyball rosters

The following teams and players took part in the men's volleyball tournament at the 1968 Summer Olympics, in Mexico City.

== Belgium ==
The following volleyball players represented Belgium:

- Benno Saelens
- Bernard Vaillant
- Berto Poosen
- Fernand Walder
- Hugo Huybrechts
- Jozef Mol
- Leo Dierckx
- Paul Mestdagh
- Roger Maes
- Roger Vandergoten
- Ronald Vandewal
- Willem Bossaerts

== Brazil ==
The following volleyball players represented Brazil:

- Antônio Carlos Moreno
- Feitosa
- Décio de Azevedo
- Gerson Schuch
- João Jens
- Jorge de Souza
- José da Costa
- Marco Antônio Volpi
- Mário Dunlop
- Paulo Peterle
- Sérgio Pinheiro
- Victor Borges

== Bulgaria ==
The following volleyball players represented Bulgaria:

- Aleksandar Aleksandrov
- Aleksandar Trenev
- Angel Koritarov
- Dimitar Karov
- Dimitar Zlatanov
- Dinko Atanasov
- Gramen Prinov
- Kiril Slavov
- Milcho Milev
- Petar Krachmarov
- Stoyan Stoyanov
- Zdravko Simeonov

== Czechoslovakia ==
The following volleyball players represented Czechoslovakia:

- Bohumil Golian
- Antonín Procházka
- Petr Kop
- Jiří Svoboda
- Josef Musil
- Lubomír Zajíček
- Josef Smolka
- Vladimír Petlák
- František Sokol
- Zdeněk Groessl
- Pavel Schenk
- Drahomír Koudelka

== East Germany ==
The following volleyball players represented East Germany:

- Arnold Schulz
- Eckehard Pietzsch
- Eckhard Tielscher
- Horst Peter
- Jürgen Freiwald
- Jürgen Kessel
- Manfred Heine
- Rainer Tscharke
- Rudi Schumann
- Siegfried Schneider
- Walter Toussaint
- Wolfgang Webner

== Japan ==
The following volleyball players represented Japan:

- Masayuki Minami
- Katsutoshi Nekoda
- Mamoru Shiragami
- Isao Koizumi
- Kenji Kimura
- Yasuaki Mitsumori
- Jungo Morita
- Tadayoshi Yokota
- Seiji Oko
- Tetsuo Sato
- Kenji Shimaoka

== Mexico ==
The following volleyball players represented Mexico:

- Antonio Barbet
- Carlos Aguirre
- Carlos Barron
- César Osuna
- Eduardo Jiménez
- Eduardo Sixtos
- Francisco González
- Jesús Loya
- Joël Calva
- Juan Manuel Durán
- Leopoldo Reyna
- Luis Martell

== Poland ==
The following volleyball players represented Poland:

- Aleksander Skiba
- Edward Skorek
- Hubert Wagner
- Jerzy Szymczyk
- Romuald Paszkiewicz
- Stanisław Gościniak
- Stanisław Zduńczyk
- Tadeusz Siwek
- Wojciech Rutkowski
- Zbigniew Jasiukiewicz
- Zbigniew Zarzycki
- Zdzisław Ambroziak

== Soviet Union ==
The following volleyball players represented the Soviet Union:

- Eduard Sibiryakov
- Yuriy Poiarkov
- Georgy Mondzolevsky
- Valery Kravchenko
- Volodymyr Bieliaiev
- Yevhen Lapynskiy
- Ivans Bugajenkovs
- Oļegs Antropovs
- Vasilijus Matuševas
- Viktor Mykhalchuk
- Borys Tereshchuk
- Volodymyr Ivanov

== United States ==
The following volleyball players represented the United States:

- John Alstrom
- Mike Bright
- Wink Davenport
- Smitty Duke
- Tom Haine
- John Henn
- Butch May
- Danny Patterson
- Larry Rundle
- Jon Stanley
- Rudy Suwara
- Pete Velasco
