= Brazil men's national volleyball team =

Men's national volleyball team representing Brazil

Brazil
- Nickname(s): Canarinhos; Galactic; Best of All Times
- Association: Confederação Brasileira de Voleibol (CBV)
- Confederation: CSV
- Head coach: Bernardo Rezende
- FIVB ranking: 6 ▲1 (1 October 2026)

Uniforms
Home	Away	Third

Summer Olympics
- Appearances: 16 (First in 1964)
- Best result: (1992, 2004, 2016)

World Championship
- Appearances: 17 (First in 1956)
- Best result: (2002, 2006, 2010)

World Cup
- Appearances: 12 (First in 1969)
- Best result: (2003, 2007, 2019)
- www.cbv.com.br (in Portuguese)
Honours
Event	1st	2nd	3rd
Olympic Games	3	3	0
World Championship	3	3	1
World Cup	3	0	3
World Grand Champions Cup	5	2	0
World League	9	7	4
Nations League	1	0	1
Pan American Games	5	7	5
Pan-American Cup	3	2	0
South American Championship	34	1	0
Other competitions	4	4	0
Total	70	29	14
Medal record
Olympic Games
Gold medal – first place	1992 Barcelona	Team
Gold medal – first place	2004 Athens	Team
Gold medal – first place	2016 Rio de Janeiro	Team
Silver medal – second place	1984 Los Angeles	Team
Silver medal – second place	2008 Beijing	Team
Silver medal – second place	2012 London	Team
World Championship
Gold medal – first place	2002 Argentina	Team
Gold medal – first place	2006 Japan	Team
Gold medal – first place	2010 Italy	Team
Silver medal – second place	1982 Argentina	Team
Silver medal – second place	2014 Poland	Team
Silver medal – second place	2018 Italy/Bulgaria	Team
Bronze medal – third place	2022 Poland/Slovenia	Team
World Cup
Gold medal – first place	2003 Japan	
Gold medal – first place	2007 Japan	
Gold medal – first place	2019 Japan	
Bronze medal – third place	1981 Japan	
Bronze medal – third place	1995 Japan	
Bronze medal – third place	2011 Japan	
World Grand Champions Cup
Gold medal – first place	1997 Japan	
Gold medal – first place	2005 Japan	
Gold medal – first place	2009 Japan	
Gold medal – first place	2013 Japan	
Gold medal – first place	2017 Japan	
Silver medal – second place	1993 Japan	
Silver medal – second place	2001 Japan	
World League
Gold medal – first place	1993 São Paulo	
Gold medal – first place	2001 Katowice	
Gold medal – first place	2003 Madrid	
Gold medal – first place	2004 Rome	
Gold medal – first place	2005 Belgrade	
Gold medal – first place	2006 Moscow	
Gold medal – first place	2007 Katowice	
Gold medal – first place	2009 Belgrade	
Gold medal – first place	2010 Córdoba	
Silver medal – second place	1995 Rio de Janeiro	
Silver medal – second place	2002 Belo Horizonte	
Silver medal – second place	2011 Gdansk	
Silver medal – second place	2013 Mar del Plata	
Silver medal – second place	2014 Florence	
Silver medal – second place	2016 Kraków	
Silver medal – second place	2017 Curitiba	
Bronze medal – third place	1990 Osaka	
Bronze medal – third place	1994 Milan	
Bronze medal – third place	1999 Mar del Plata	
Bronze medal – third place	2000 Rotterdam	
Nations League
Gold medal – first place	2021 Rimini	
Bronze medal – third place	2025 Ningbo	
Pan American Games
Gold medal – first place	1963 São Paulo	Team
Gold medal – first place	1983 Caracas	Team
Gold medal – first place	2007 Rio de Janeiro	Team
Gold medal – first place	2011 Guadalajara	Team
Gold medal – first place	2023 Santiago	Team
Silver medal – second place	1959 Chicago	Team
Silver medal – second place	1967 Winnipeg	Team
Silver medal – second place	1975 Mexico City	Team
Silver medal – second place	1979 San Juan	Team
Silver medal – second place	1991 Havana	Team
Silver medal – second place	1999 Winnipeg	Team
Silver medal – second place	2015 Toronto	Team
Bronze medal – third place	1955 Mexico City	Team
Bronze medal – third place	1971 Cali	Team
Bronze medal – third place	1987 Indianapolis	Team
Bronze medal – third place	2003 Santo Domingo	Team
Bronze medal – third place	2019 Lima	Team
Pan-American Cup
Gold medal – first place	2011 Gatineau	
Gold medal – first place	2013 Mexico City	
Gold medal – first place	2015 Reno	
Silver medal – second place	2018 Córdoba	
Silver medal – second place	2023 Guadalajara	
South American Championship
Gold medal – first place	1951 Rio de Janeiro	
Gold medal – first place	1956 Montevideo	
Gold medal – first place	1958 Porto Alegre	
Gold medal – first place	1961 Lima	
Gold medal – first place	1962 Santiago	
Gold medal – first place	1967 Santos	
Gold medal – first place	1969 Caracas	
Gold medal – first place	1971 Montevideo	
Gold medal – first place	1973 Bucaramanga	
Gold medal – first place	1975 Asuncíon	
Gold medal – first place	1977 Lima	
Gold medal – first place	1979 Rosario	
Gold medal – first place	1981 Santiago	
Gold medal – first place	1983 São Paulo	
Gold medal – first place	1985 Caracas	
Gold medal – first place	1987 Montevideo	
Gold medal – first place	1989 Curitiba	
Gold medal – first place	1991 Osasco	
Gold medal – first place	1993 Córdoba	
Gold medal – first place	1995 Porto Alegre	
Gold medal – first place	1997 Caracas	
Gold medal – first place	1999 Córdoba	
Gold medal – first place	2001 Cali	
Gold medal – first place	2003 Rio de Janeiro	
Gold medal – first place	2005 Lages	
Gold medal – first place	2007 Santiago	
Gold medal – first place	2009 Bogotá	
Gold medal – first place	2011 Cuiabá	
Gold medal – first place	2013 Cabo Frio	
Gold medal – first place	2015 Maceió	
Gold medal – first place	2017 Santiago	
Gold medal – first place	2019 Santiago	
Gold medal – first place	2021 Brasília	
Gold medal – first place	2026 Rio de Janeiro	
Silver medal – second place	2023 Recife	
America's Cup
Gold medal – first place	1998 Argentina	
Gold medal – first place	1999 United States	
Gold medal – first place	2001 Argentina	
Silver medal – second place	2000 Brazil	
Silver medal – second place	2005 Brazil	
Silver medal – second place	2007 Brazil	
Silver medal – second place	2008 Brazil	
Copa Sudamericana
Gold medal – first place	2025 Betim	
Silver medal – second place	2026 Cochabamba	

The Brazil men's national volleyball team is governed by the Confederação Brasileira de Voleibol (Brazilian Volleyball Confederation) and takes part in international volleyball competitions. Brazil has won three gold medals at the Olympic Games, has won the World Championship three times, and the World League nine times.

With a tally total of 69 titles, Brazil is the national volleyball team that has won the most titles overall in the main FIVB sanctioned competitions, and also the national team that has won the most international titles outside their regional competition. The team has a winning record against every other nation recognized by the FIVB and is sometimes referred to as volleyball's "Dream Team" in reference to its remarkable winning streak period under coach Bernardo Rezende. Currently Brazil is ranked third in the FIVB World Rankings.

== Performance history ==
=== 2000 until now ===
After the sixth place in the Sydney Olympic Games, the Brazilian men's national team underwent some important changes ahead of the 2001 season. Mr. Bernardo Rezende, nicknamed Bernardinho, who had spent six years coaching the women's national team, was chosen to be the head coach of the Brazilian men's national team. In the first season with Bernardinho, the team conquered three gold medals (World League, America's Cup and South American Championship) and one silver medal (World Grand Champions Cup). In 2002, Brazil finished second in the World League after losing the title at home idc in the match against Russia. But in that same season, they conquered the World Championship for the first time ever.

The beginning of the 2003 season was very special for the World Champions. In an exciting final match against Serbia and Montenegro, Brazil won the World League gold medal for the third time, beating its opponent 3–2 in Madrid. After that, the team was defeated by Venezuela in the semifinal of the Pan American Games in Santo Domingo (Dominican Republic) and ended up with the bronze in the competition. However, the Brazilian squad beat Venezuela by 3–0 in the South American Championship final only one month later. That year ended with Brazil conquering the last title it had not won yet: the World Cup, in Japan.

In 2004, Bernardinho led the Brazilian team to a fourth title of the World League. In August, the Brazilian men's team won the second Olympic gold medal of its history, which happened in Athens in 2004 (the first one was conquered in Barcelona in 1992). In the final, Brazil beat Italy 3–1.

In the 2005 season, the Olympic Champion won four medals. In the final match against Serbia and Montenegro, Brazil won another gold medal in the World League, beating its opponent 3–1. After that, the team became second in the America's Cup, defeated by the United States in the final. Then in the South American Championship, Brazil conquered its 25th title, winning all matches and losing just one set. To end this great season, Bernardo Rezende's team secured the gold medal in the World Grand Champions Cup in Japan. During the year 2006, the Brazilian team won a sixth title in the World League and a second title in the World Championship. This team was considered by some commentators to the best and most consistent men's volleyball team of all time.

== Medals ==
Event	Gold	Silver	Bronze	Total
Olympic Games	3	3	0	6
World Championship	3	3	1	7
World Cup	3	0	3	6
World Grand Champions Cup	5	2	0	7
World League	9	7	4	20
Nations League	1	0	1	2
Pan American Games	5	7	5	17
Pan-American Cup	3	2	0	5
South American Championship	33	1	0	34
South American Cup	1	0	0	1
America's Cup	3	4	0	7
Total	69	29	14	112

== Tournament record ==
=== Olympic Games ===
Champions Runners up Third place Fourth place

Olympic Games record
Year	Round	Position	GP	MW	ML	SW	SL	Squad
(Japan) 1964	Round Robin	7th	9	3	6	13	23	Squad
(Mexico) 1968	Round Robin	9th	9	1	8	8	25	Squad
(Germany) 1972	Preliminary Round	8th	7	2	5	9	19	Squad
(Canada) 1976	Preliminary Round	7th	5	2	3	8	11	Squad
(Soviet Union) 1980	Preliminary Round	5th	6	4	2	15	10	Squad
(United States) 1984	Final	2nd	6	4	2	13	8	Squad
(South Korea) 1988	Semifinals	4th	7	4	3	16	13	Squad
(Spain) 1992	Final	1st	8	8	0	24	3	Squad
(United States) 1996	Quarterfinals	5th	8	5	3	18	10	Squad
(Australia) 2000	Quarterfinals	6th	8	6	2	19	9	Squad
(Greece) 2004	Final	1st	8	7	1	22	8	Squad
(China) 2008	Final	2nd	8	6	2	20	8	Squad
(United Kingdom) 2012	Final	2nd	8	6	2	21	8	Squad
(Brazil) 2016	Final	1st	8	6	2	20	10	Squad
(Japan) 2020	Semifinals	4th	8	5	3	18	14	Squad
(France) 2024	Quarterfinals	8th	4	1	3	7	9	Squad
(United States) 2028	Future event							
(Australia) 2032	Future event							
Total	16/18	3 Titles	117	70	47	251	188	—

=== World Championship ===
Champions Runners up Third place Fourth place

World Championship record
Year	Round	Position	GP	MW	ML	SW	SL	Squad
(Czechoslovakia) 1949	Did not compete							
(Soviet Union) 1952	Did not compete							
(France) 1956	Group Round	11th	11	10	1	31	6	Squad
(Brazil) 1960	Final Group	5th	10	5	5	15	17	Squad
(Soviet Union) 1962	Final Group	10th	11	2	9	14	27	Squad
(Czechoslovakia) 1966	Group Round	13th	10	4	6	17	18	Squad
(Bulgaria) 1970	Group Round	12th	11	6	5	23	20	Squad
(Mexico) 1974	7th–12th places	9th	11	5	6	18	18	Squad
(Italy) 1978	5th–8th places	6th	9	5	4	21	15	Squad
(Argentina) 1982	Final	2nd	9	6	3	19	10	Squad
(France) 1986	Semifinals	4th	8	6	2	18	9	Squad
(Brazil) 1990	Semifinals	4th	7	4	3	16	11	Squad
(Greece) 1994	Quarterfinals	5th	7	5	2	19	8	Squad
(Japan) 1998	Semifinals	4th	12	10	2	33	9	Squad
(Argentina) 2002	Final	1st	9	8	1	26	8	Squad
(Japan) 2006	Final	1st	11	10	1	31	6	Squad
(Italy) 2010	Final	1st	9	7	2	23	10	Squad
(Poland) 2014	Final	2nd	13	11	2	36	12	Squad
(Italy) (Bulgaria) 2018	Final	2nd	12	10	2	31	13	Squad
(Poland) (Slovenia) 2022	Semifinals	3rd	7	6	1	20	7	Squad
(Philippines) 2025	Preliminary round	17th	3	2	1	6	4	Squad
(Poland) 2027	Future event							
(Qatar) 2029	Future event							
Total	19/23	3 Titles	180	122	58	417	228	—

=== World Cup ===
Champions Runners up Third place Fourth place

World Cup record
Year	Round	Position	GP	MW	ML	SW	SL	Squad
(East Germany) 1969	Round Robin	6th	7	3	4	10	16	Squad
(Japan) 1977	5th–8th semifinals	8th	8	3	5	13	17	Squad
(Japan) 1981	Round Robin	3rd	7	5	2	16	11	Squad
(Japan) 1985	Round Robin	4th	7	4	3	16	11	Squad
(Japan) 1989	Round Robin	5th	7	3	4	13	14	Squad
(Japan) 1991	Round Robin	6th	8	4	4	16	15	Squad
(Japan) 1995	Round Robin	3rd	11	9	2	29	7	Squad
(Japan) 1999	Round Robin	5th	11	7	4	27	15	Squad
(Japan) 2003	Round Robin	1st	11	11	0	33	4	Squad
(Japan) 2007	Round Robin	1st	11	10	1	30	4	Squad
(Japan) 2011	Round Robin	3rd	11	8	3	29	14	Squad
(Japan) 2019	Round Robin	1st	11	11	0	33	5	Squad
Total	12/14	3 Titles	110	78	32	265	133	—

=== World Grand Champions Cup ===
Champions Runners up Third place Fourth place

World Grand Champions record
Year	Round	Position	GP	MW	ML	SW	SL	Squad
(Japan) 1993	Round Robin	Runners up	5	4	1	14	6	Squad
(Japan) 1997	Round Robin	Champions	5	5	0	15	3	Squad
(Japan) 2001	Round Robin	Runners up	5	4	1	14	4	Squad
(Japan) 2005	Round Robin	Champions	5	5	0	15	6	Squad
(Japan) 2009	Round Robin	Champions	5	5	0	15	3	Squad
(Japan) 2013	Round Robin	Champions	5	4	1	14	6	Squad
(Japan) 2017	Round Robin	Champions	5	4	1	14	5	Squad
Total	7/7	5 Titles	35	31	4	101	33	—

=== World League ===
Champions Runners up Third place Fourth place

World League record
Year	Round	Position	GP	MW	ML	SW	SL	Squad
(Japan) 1990	Semifinals	3rd	14	10	4	32	24	Squad
(Italy) 1991	Intercontinental Round	5th	16	8	8	32	32	Squad
(Italy) 1992	Final Round	5th	16	10	6	35	26	Squad
(Brazil) 1993	Final	1st	22	17	5	58	18	Squad
(Italy) 1994	Semifinals	3rd	16	15	1	47	8	Squad
(Brazil) 1995	Final	2nd	17	10	7	38	28	Squad
(Netherlands) 1996	Final Round	5th	16	11	5	39	22	Squad
(Russia) 1997	Final Round	5th	16	12	4	37	18	Squad
(Italy) 1998	Playoff Round	5th	15	10	5	34	17	Squad
(Argentina) 1999	Semifinals	3rd	16	13	3	43	20	Squad
(Netherlands) 2000	Semifinals	3rd	18	11	7	39	27	Squad
(Poland) 2001	Final	1st	17	16	1	50	16	Squad
(Brazil) 2002	Final	2nd	17	13	4	44	20	Squad
(Spain) 2003	Final	1st	17	15	2	47	18	Squad
(Italy) 2004	Final	1st	15	15	0	45	8	Squad
(Serbia and Montenegro) 2005	Final	1st	15	14	1	42	12	Squad
(Russia) 2006	Final	1st	17	16	1	48	15	Squad
(Poland) 2007	Final	1st	16	15	1	47	11	Squad
(Brazil) 2008	Semifinals	4th	16	12	4	41	20	Squad
(Serbia) 2009	Final	1st	16	15	1	47	9	Squad
(Argentina) 2010	Final	1st	16	15	1	45	22	Squad
(Poland) 2011	Final	2nd	17	13	4	43	19	Squad
(Poland) 2012	Final Round	6th	14	8	6	33	23	Squad
(Argentina) 2013	Final	2nd	14	11	3	36	18	Squad
(Italy) 2014	Final	2nd	16	8	8	31	31	Squad
(Brazil) 2015	Final Round	5th	14	10	4	37	20	Squad
(Poland) 2016	Final	2nd	13	11	2	34	14	Squad
(Brazil) 2017	Final	2nd	13	9	4	33	21	Squad
Total	28/28	9 Titles	445	343	102	1137	537	—

=== Nations League ===
Champions Runners up Third place Fourth place

Nations League record
Year	Round	Position	GP	MW	ML	SW	SL	PW	PL	Squad
(France) 2018	Semifinals	4th	19	11	8	39	30	1585	1538	Squad
(United States) 2019	Semifinals	4th	19	15	4	51	26	1781	1609	Squad
(Italy) 2021	Final	1st	17	15	2	45	13	1432	1237	Squad
(Italy) 2022	Quarterfinals	6th	13	8	5	27	17	1047	976	Squad
(Poland) 2023	Quarterfinals	6th	13	8	5	30	21	1173	1109	Squad
(Poland) 2024	Quarterfinals	7th	13	6	7	28	27	1240	1199	Squad
(China) 2025	Semifinals	3rd	15	13	2	41	16	1363	1250	Squad
(China) 2026	Preliminary round	10th	12	7	5	23	21	1017	985	Squad
(N/A) 2027	qualified									
Total	9/9	1 Title	121	83	38	284	171	10638	9903	—

=== Pan American Games ===
Champions Runners up Third place Fourth place

Pan American Games record
Year	Round	Position	GP	MW	ML	SW	SL	Squad
(Mexico) 1955	Round Robin	Bronze	5	3	2	9	4	
(United States) 1959	Final Round	Silver	6	4	2	15	9	
(Brazil) 1963	Final Round	Gold	8	8	0	24	1	
(Canada) 1967	Final Round	Silver	7	6	1	20	5	
(Colombia) 1971	Final Round	Bronze	8	7	1	21	3	
(Mexico) 1975	Round Robin	Silver	7	6	1	18	9	
(Puerto Rico) 1979	Round Robin	Silver	7	5	2	16	8	
(Venezuela) 1983	Final	Gold	7	6	1	20	5	
(United States) 1987	Semifinals	Bronze	7	4	3	16	12	
(Cuba) 1991	Final	Silver	7	5	2	16	7	
(Argentina) 1995	Group Round	7th Place	3	1	2	3	6	
(Canada) 1999	Final	Silver	5	4	1	14	6	
(Dominican Republic) 2003	Semifinals	Bronze	5	4	1	14	3	
(Brazil) 2007	Final	Gold	5	5	0	15	0	Squad
(Mexico) 2011	Final	Gold	5	5	0	15	3	Squad
(Canada) 2015	Final	Silver	5	3	2	13	6	Squad
(Peru) 2019	Semifinals	Bronze	5	4	1	12	7	Squad
(Chile) 2023	Final	Gold	5	5	0	15	2	Squad
(Peru) 2027	Future event							
Total	17/17	5 Titles	107	85	22	276	96	—

=== Pan-American Cup ===
Champions Runners up Third place Fourth place

Pan-American Cup record
Year	Round	Position	GP	MW	ML	SW	SL	Squad
(Puerto Rico) 2010	Semifinals	4th Place	4	2	2	7	9	Squad
(Canada) 2011	Final	Champions	4	4	0	14	1	Squad
(Dominican Republic) 2012	Semifinals	4th Place	6	3	3	14	10	Squad
(Mexico) 2013	Final	Champions	4	4	0	12	0	Squad
(United States) 2015	Final	Champions	5	5	0	15	1	Squad
(Canada) 2017	Did not compete							
(Mexico) 2018	Final	Runners-Up	5	4	1	14	4	Squad
(Canada) 2022	7th place match	8th	5	0	5	6	15	Squad
(Mexico) 2023	Final	Runners-Up	4	3	1	10	3	Squad
Total	8/17	3 Titles	37	25	12	92	43	—

=== South American Championship ===
1st 2nd 3rd

South American Championship record
Years	Rounds	Positions	GP	MW	ML	SW	SL	Squad
(Brazil) 1951	Round Robin	1st	3	3	0	9	0	—
(Uruguay) 1956	Round Robin	1st	4	4	0	12	2	—
(Brazil) 1958	Round Robin	1st	4	4	0	12	0	—
(Peru) 1961	Round Robin	1st	4	4	0	12	1	—
(Chile) 1962	Round Robin	1st	6	6	0	18	0	—
(Argentina) 1964	Did not compete							
(Brazil) 1967	Round Robin	1st	4	4	0	12	0	—
(Venezuela) 1969	Round Robin	1st	7	7	0	21	1	—
(Uruguay) 1971	Round Robin	1st	7	7	0	21	0	—
(Colombia) 1973	Round Robin	1st	4	4	0	12	0	—
(Paraguay) 1975	Round Robin	1st	7	7	0	21	0	—
(Peru) 1977	Round Robin	1st	6	6	0	18	0	—
(Argentina) 1979	Final Round	1st	4	4	0	12	0	—
(Chile) 1981	Round Robin	1st	5	5	0	15	2	—
(Brazil) 1983	Final Round	1st	5	5	0	15	0	—
(Venezuela) 1985	Round Robin	1st	5	5	0	15	0	—
(Uruguay) 1987	Round Robin	1st	6	6	0	18	0	—
(Brazil) 1989	Round Robin	1st	6	6	0	18	2	—
(Brazil) 1991	Final	1st	4	4	0	12	1	—
(Argentina) 1993	Final	1st	6	6	0	18	2	—
(Brazil) 1995	Final	1st	4	4	0	12	2	—
(Venezuela) 1997	Final	1st	4	4	0	12	0	—
(Argentina) 1999	Final	1st	4	4	0	12	2	—
(Colombia) 2001	Final Round	1st	3	3	0	9	0	—
(Brazil) 2003	Round Robin	1st	4	4	0	12	0	—
(Brazil) 2005	Round Robin	1st	5	5	0	15	1	—
(Chile) 2007	Final	1st	5	5	0	15	0	—
(Colombia) 2009	Round Robin	1st	6	6	0	18	2	—
(Brazil) 2011	Round Robin	1st	6	6	0	18	1	—
(Brazil) 2013	Round Robin	1st	4	4	0	12	2	—
(Brazil) 2015	Final	1st	5	5	0	15	1	—
(Chile) 2017	Final	1st	5	5	0	15	0	—
(Chile) 2019	Final	1st	5	5	0	15	3	—
(Brazil) 2021	Round Robin	1st	4	4	0	12	1	—
(Brazil) 2023	Round Robin	2nd	4	3	1	9	3	—
(Brazil) 2026	Round Robin	1st	5	5	0	15	0	—
Total	34/35	34 Titles	180	179	1	507	29	—

=== Copa Sudamericana ===
Champions Runners up 3rd place

Copa Sudamericana record
Year	Round	Position	GP	MW	ML	SW	SL	Squad
(Brazil) 2025	Round robin	1st	4	4	0	12	0	Squad (Note: Brazil played with their "U23" team.)
(Bolivia) 2026	Final	2nd	5	4	1	14	6	Squad (Note: Brazil played with their B team.)
Total	1 Title	2/2	9	8	1	26	6	—

=== America's Cup ===
Champions Runners up Third place Fourth place

America's Cup record
Year	Round	Position	GP	MW	ML	SW	SL	Squad
(Argentina) 1998	Final	Champions	7	7	0	21	8	Squad
(United States) 1999	Final	Champions	7	7	0	21	1	Squad
(Brazil) 2000	Final	Runners-Up	7	6	1	19	5	Squad
(Argentina) 2001	Final	Champions	7	6	1	20	4	Squad
(Brazil) 2005	Final	Runners-Up	4	3	1	11	4	Squad
(Brazil) 2007	Final	Runners-Up	4	3	1	11	3	Squad
(Brazil) 2008	Final	Runners-Up	4	3	1	11	3	Squad
Total	7/7	3 Titles	40	35	5	114	28	—

=== FIVB Olympic Qualification Tournament ===
Champions Runners up Third place Fourth place

Year	Result	Pld	W	L	SW	SL	PW	PL
(Bulgaria) 2019	Group A Champion	3	3	0	9	2	264	213
(Brazil) 2023	Group A Runner-up	7	6	1	19	10	672	616
Total	1 Title	10	9	1	28	12	936	829

=== South American Olympic Qualification Tournament ===
Champions Runners up Third place Fourth place

Year	Result	Pld	W	L	SW	SL	PW	PL
(Brazil) 2000	Round Robin Champion	3	3	0	9	2	276	219
Total	1 Title	3	3	0	9	2	276	219

=== South American World Championship Qualification Tournament ===
Champions Runners up Third place Fourth place

Year	Result	Pld	W	L	SW	SL	PW	PL
(Argentina) (Brazil) 1997	Double Round Robin Champion	6	6	0	18	3	302	157
(Brazil) 2001	Round Robin Champion	2	2	0	6	0	150	88
Total	2 Titles	8	8	0	24	3	452	245

== Team ==
=== Current squad ===
Roster for the 2024 Summer Olympics.

The roster was announced on 7 July 2024.

Head coach: Bernardo Rezende

- 1 Bruno Rezende (c) S
- 2 Lukas Bergmann OH
- 6 Adriano Xavier OH
- 9 Yoandy Leal OH
- 12 Isac Santos MB
- 14 Fernando Kreling S
- 16 Lucas Saatkamp MB
- 17 Thales Hoss L
- 18 Ricardo Lucarelli OH
- 21 Alan Souza OP
- 23 Flávio Gualberto MB
- 28 Darlan Souza OP

=== Coaches history ===
- (Brazil) Bebeto de Freitas (1984–1988)
- (Brazil) José Roberto Guimarães (1991–1996)
- (Brazil) Radamés Lattari (1997–2001)
- (Brazil) Bernardo Rezende (2001–2016)
- (Brazil) Renan Dal Zotto (2017–2023)
- (Brazil) Carlos Schwanke (2021 interim)
- (Brazil) Bernardo Rezende (2023–)

== Gallery ==
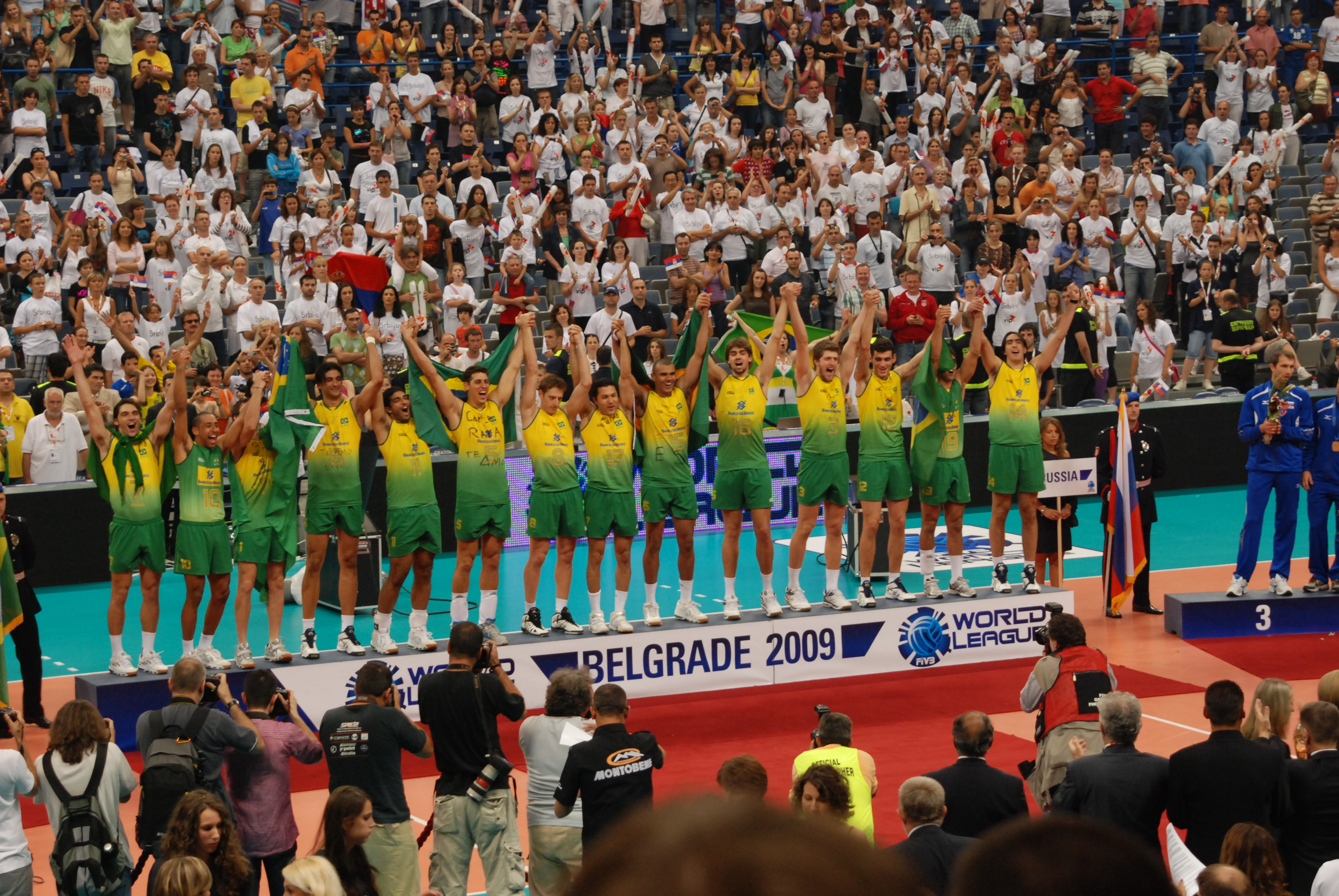
Brazil − winner of the 2009 World League

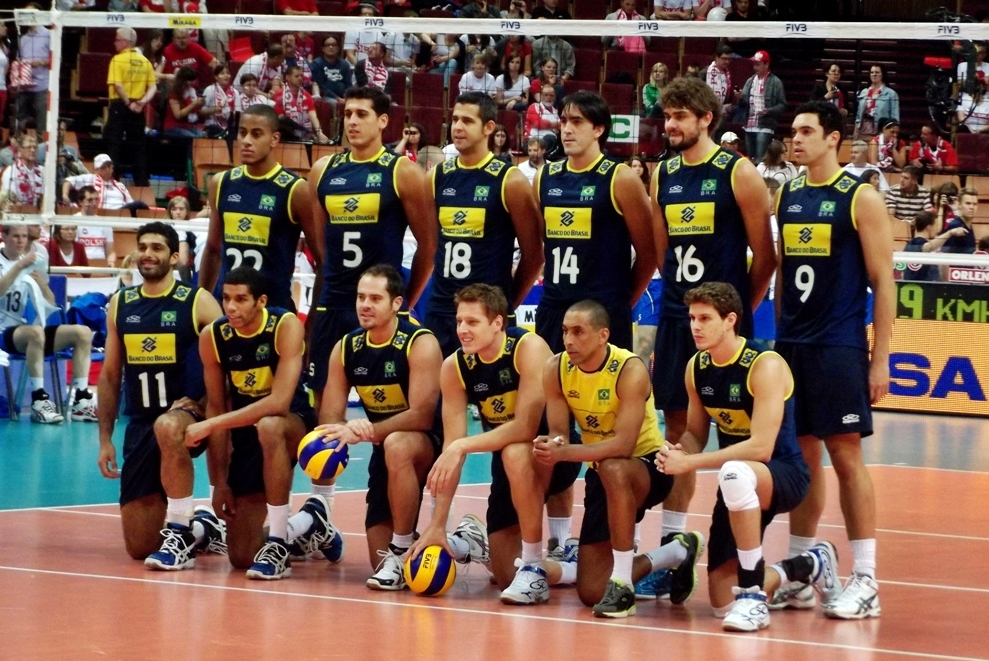
Brazil team in 2012

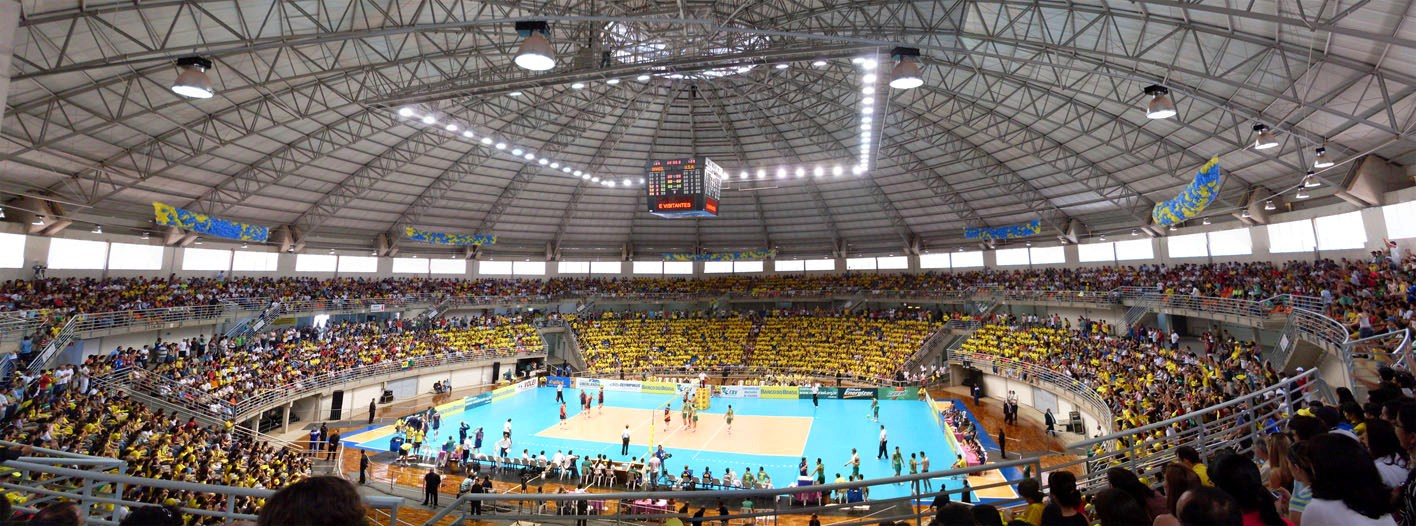
Ginásio Municipal Tancredo Neves Arena

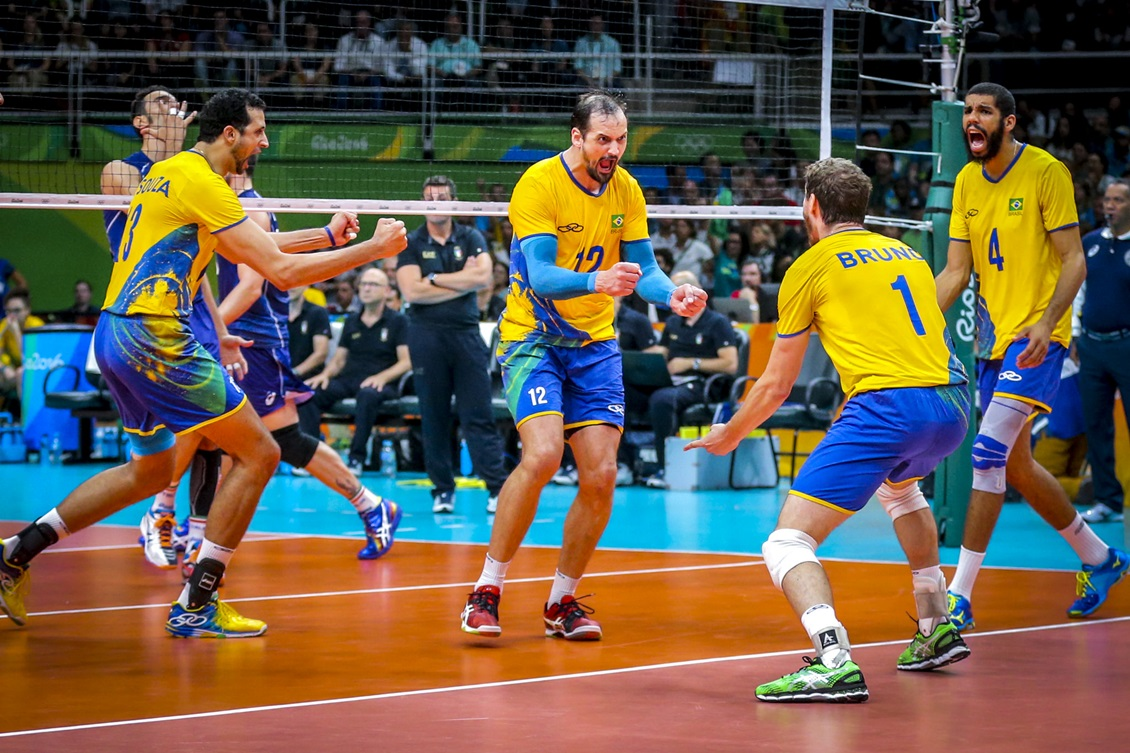
Brazil winning title of 2016 Olympic Champion

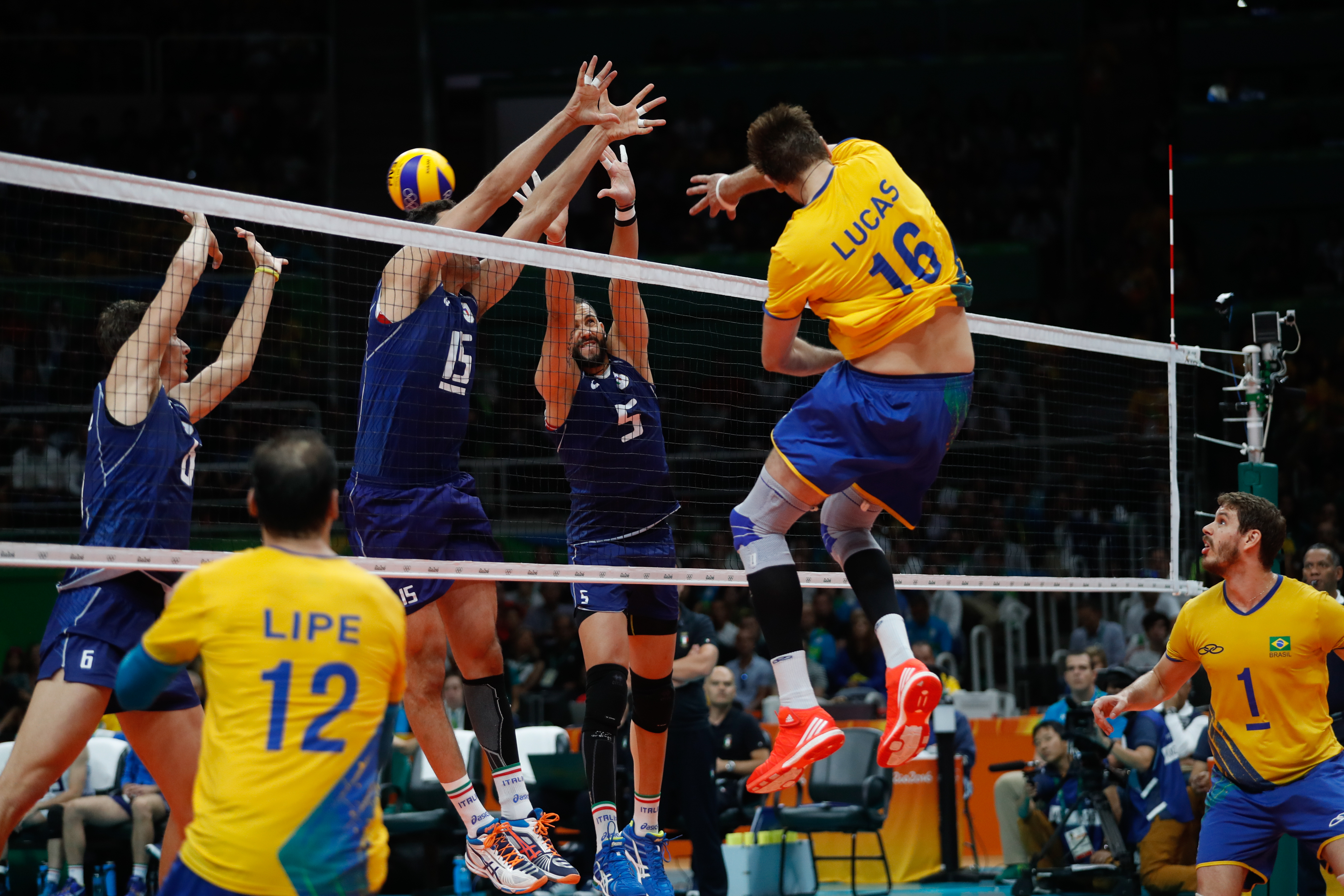
Brazil winning title of 2016 Olympic Champion

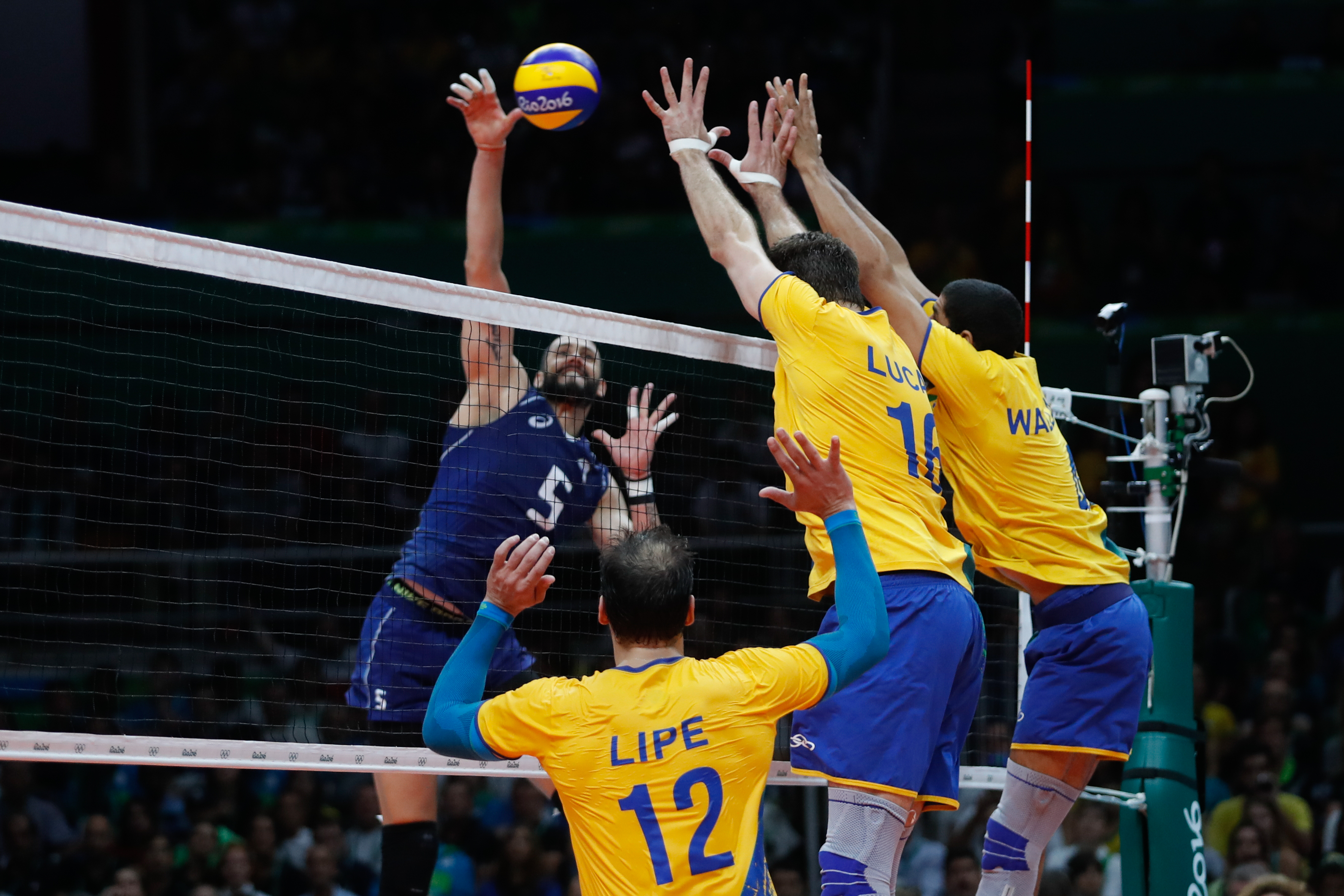
Brazil winning title of 2016 Olympic Champion

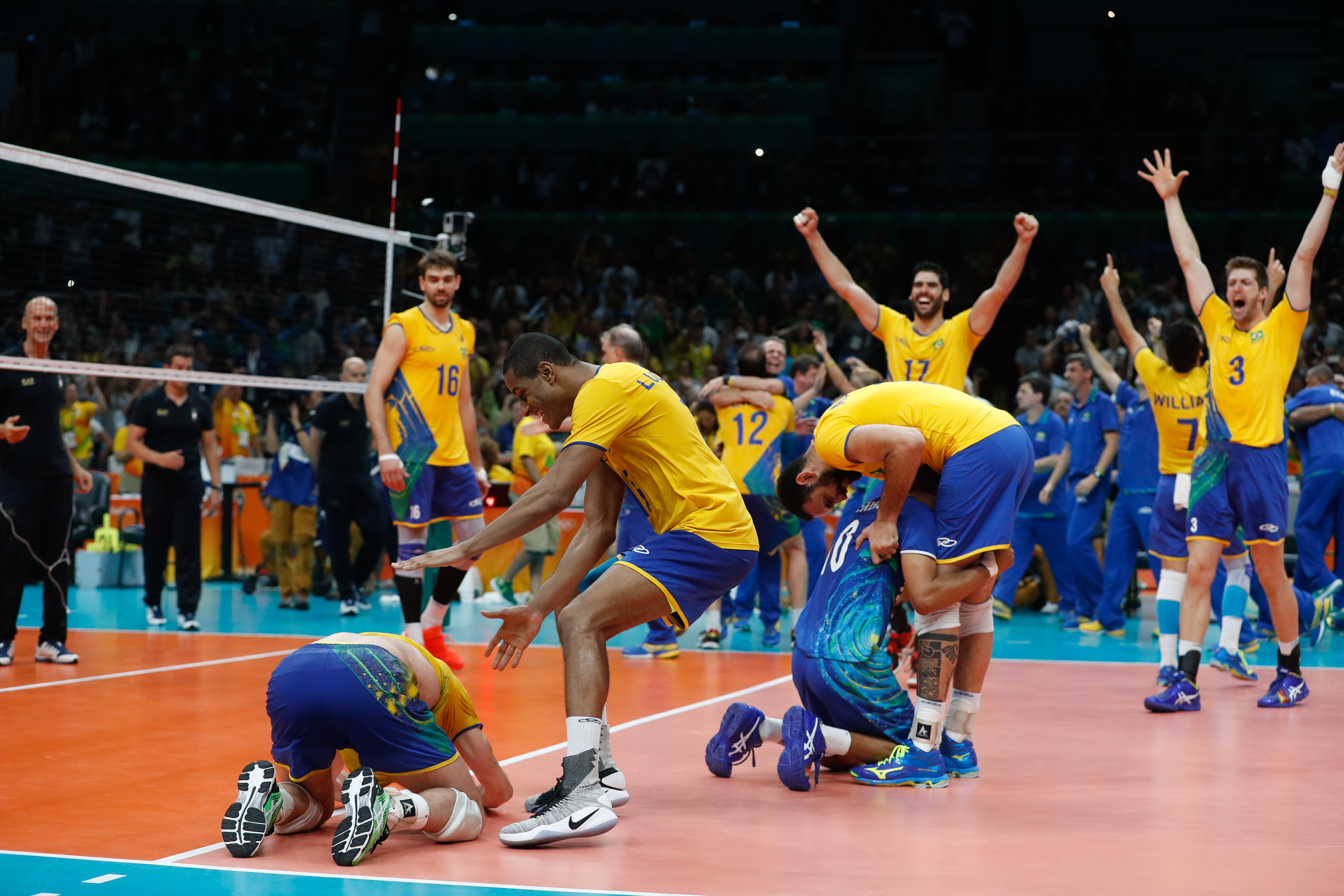
Brazil winning title of 2016 Olympic Champion

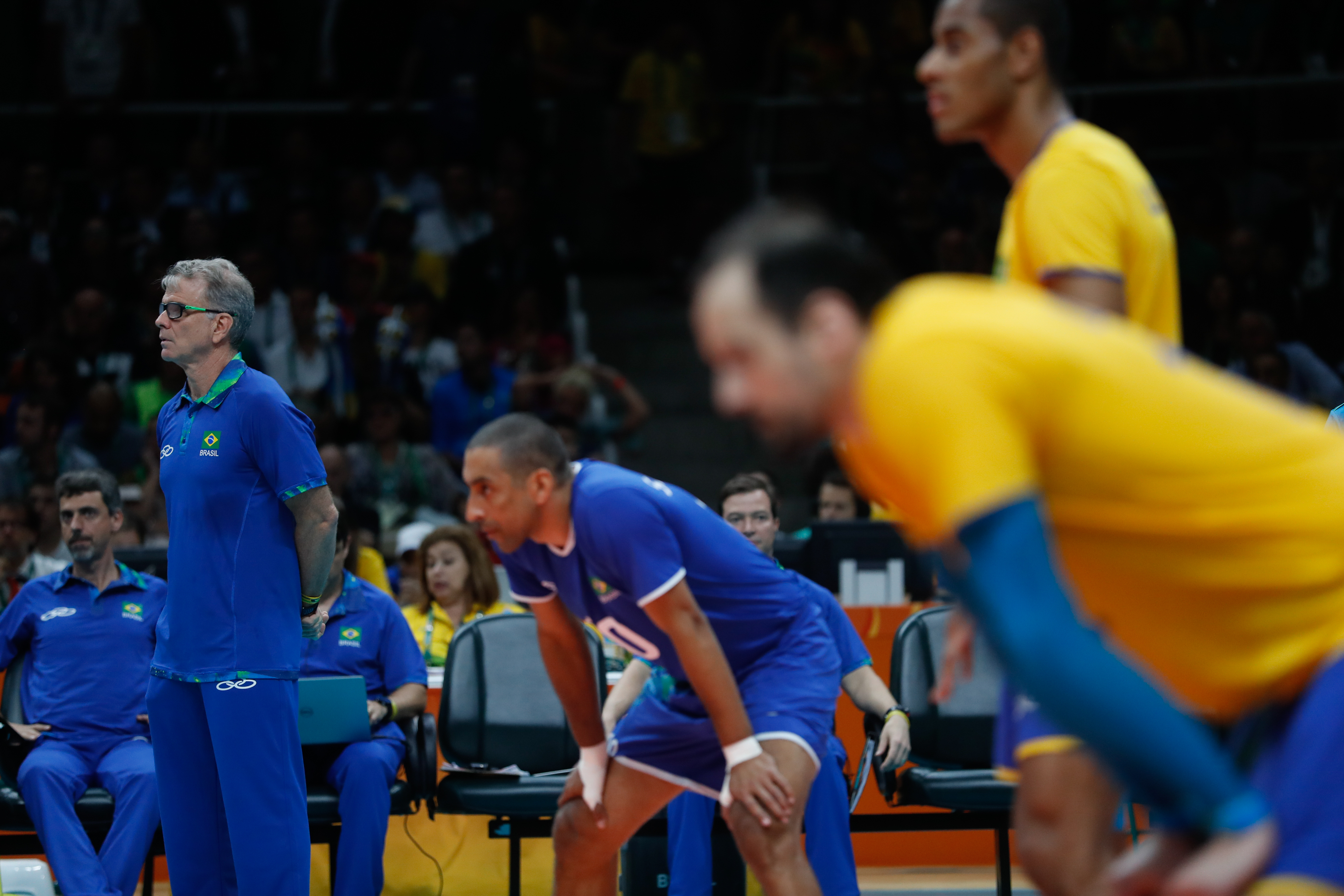
Brazil winning title of 2016 Olympic Champion

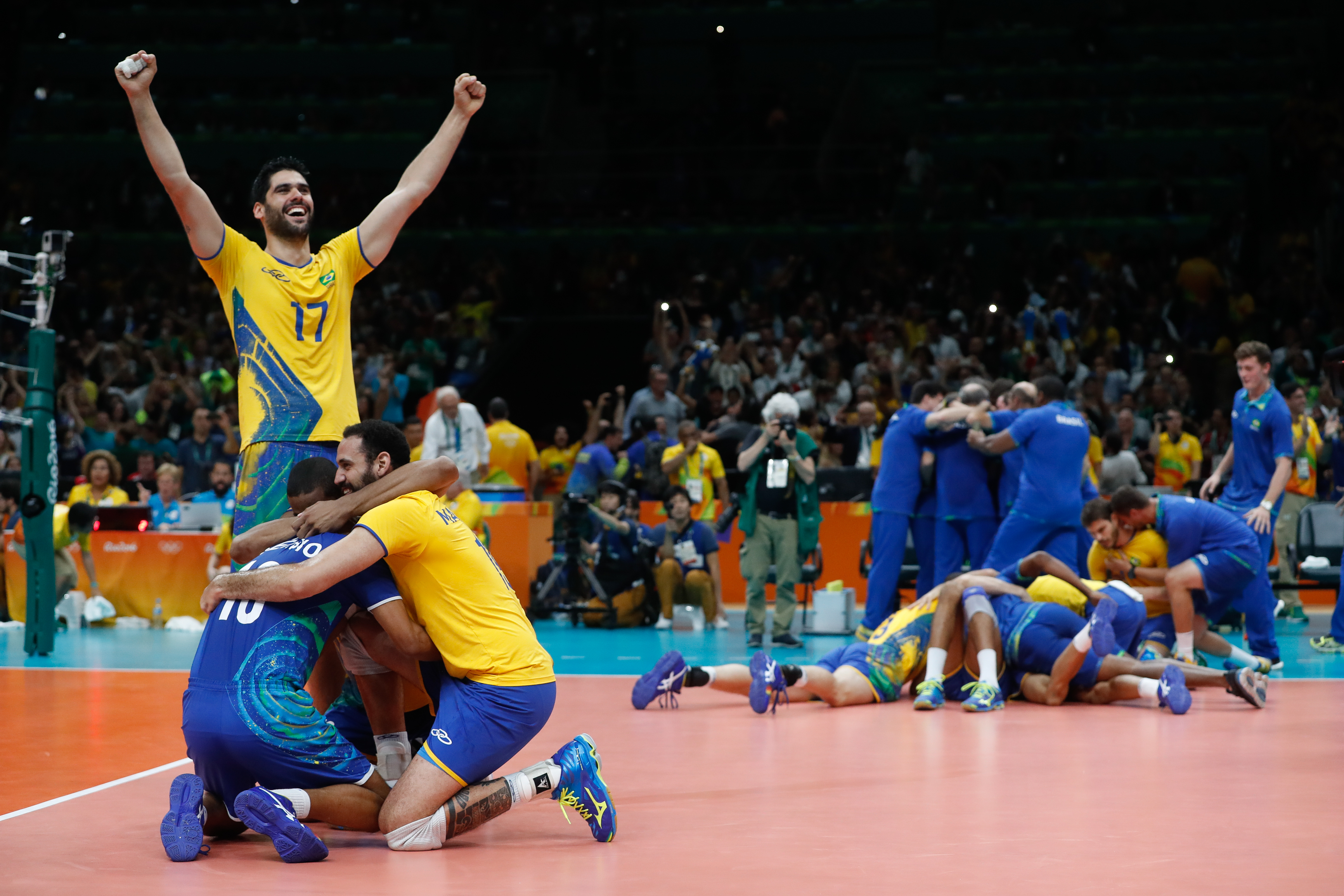
Brazil winning title of 2016 Olympic Champion

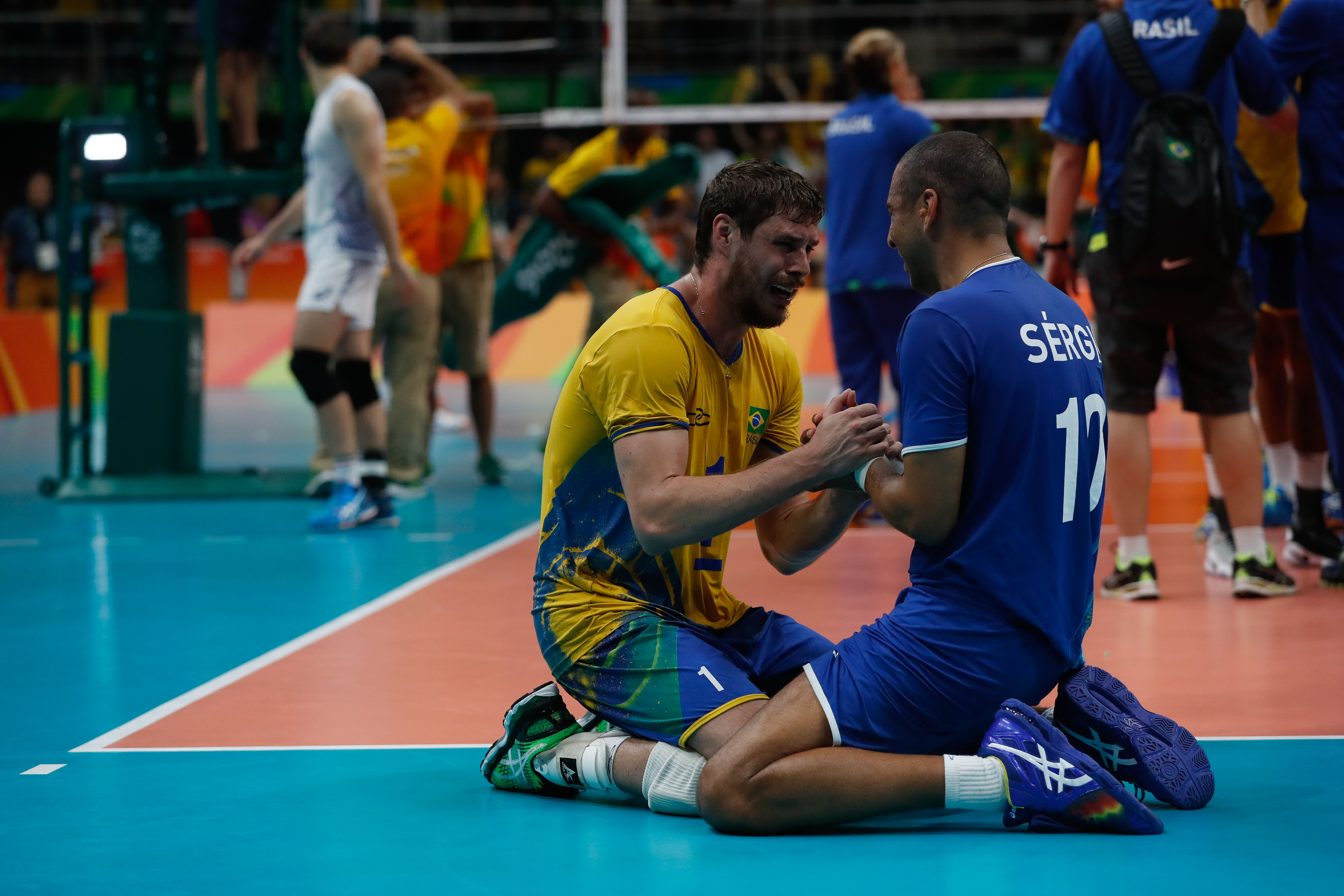
Brazil winning title of 2016 Olympic Champion

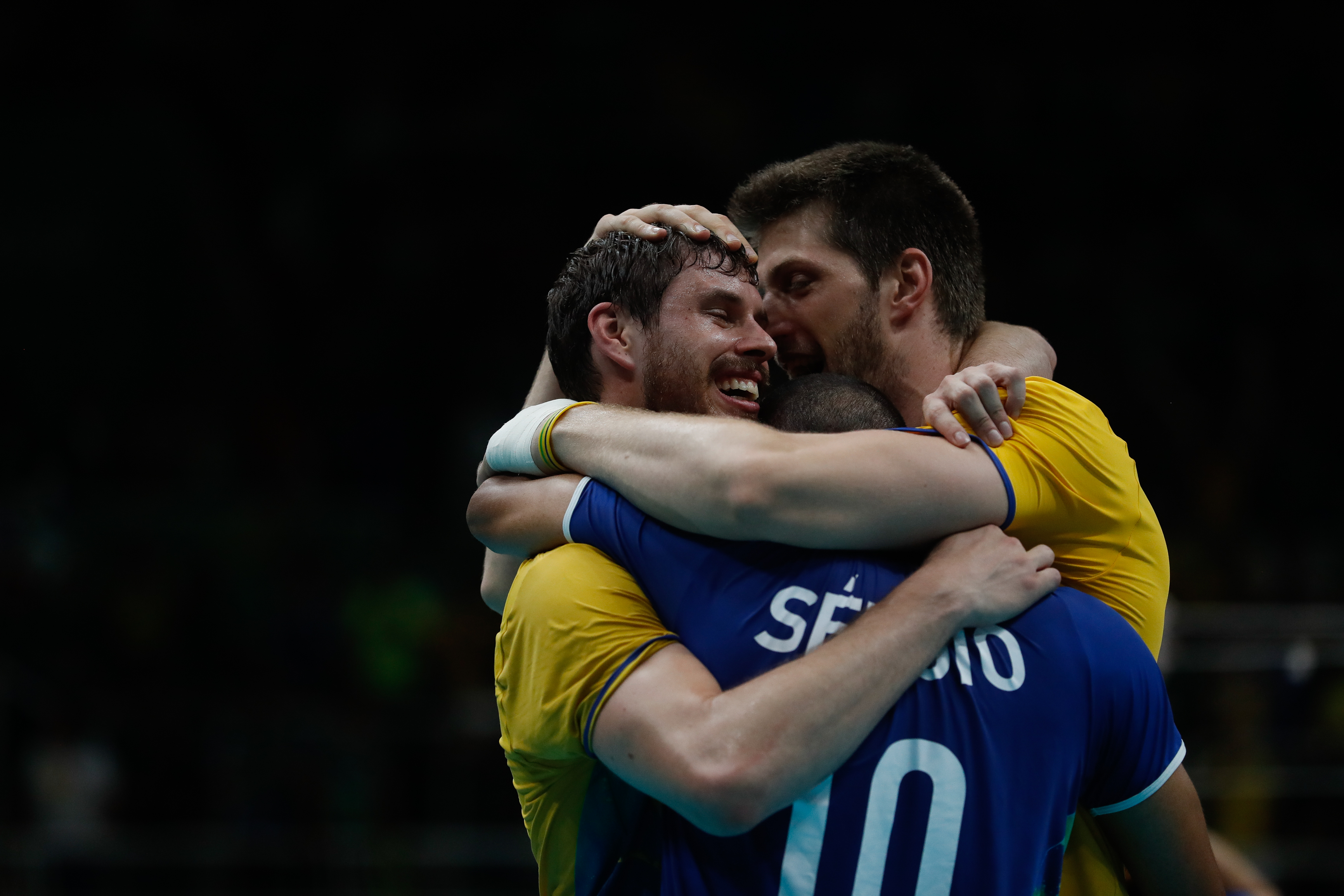
Brazil winning title of 2016 Olympic Champion

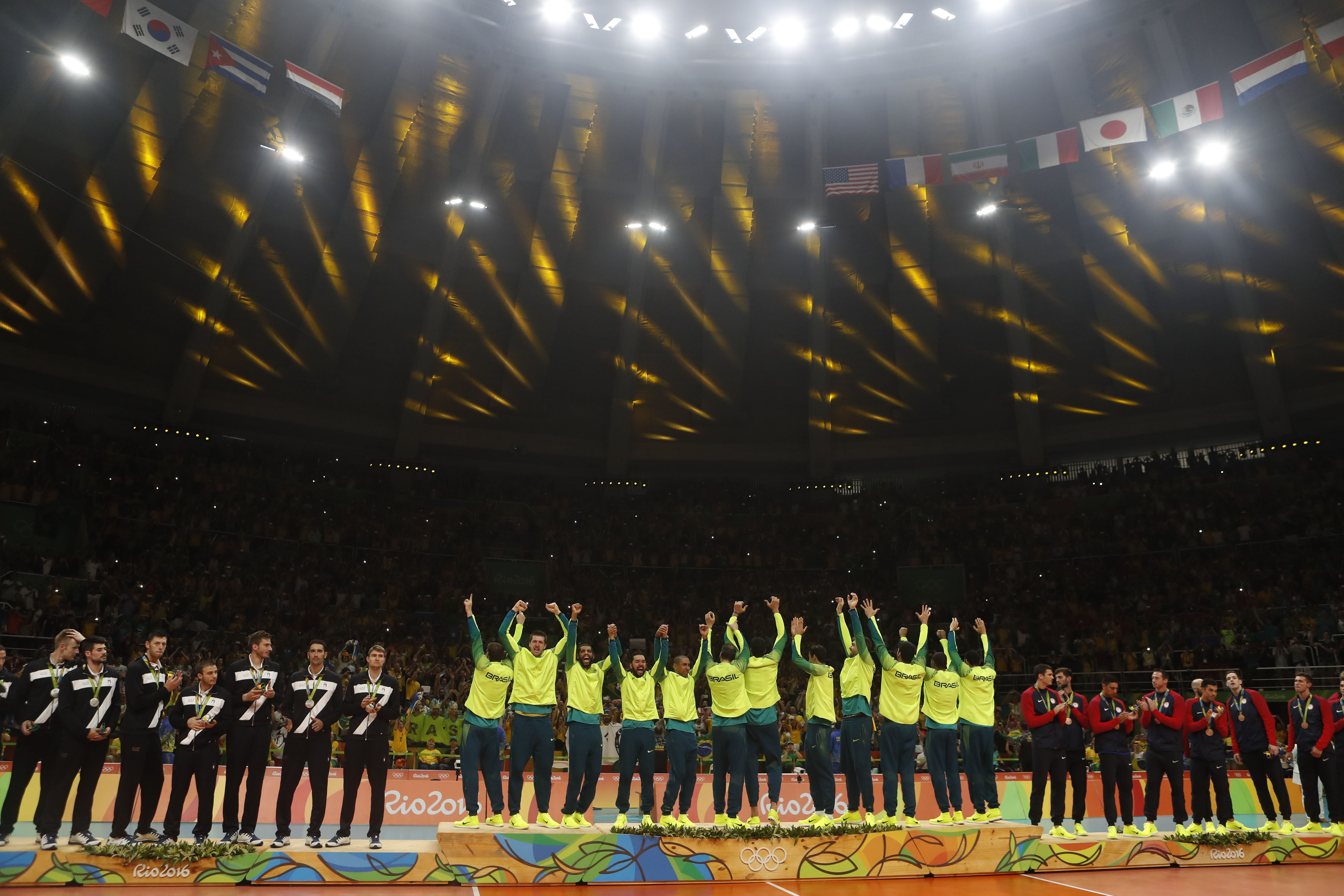
Medal ceremony - 2016 Olympic Champions

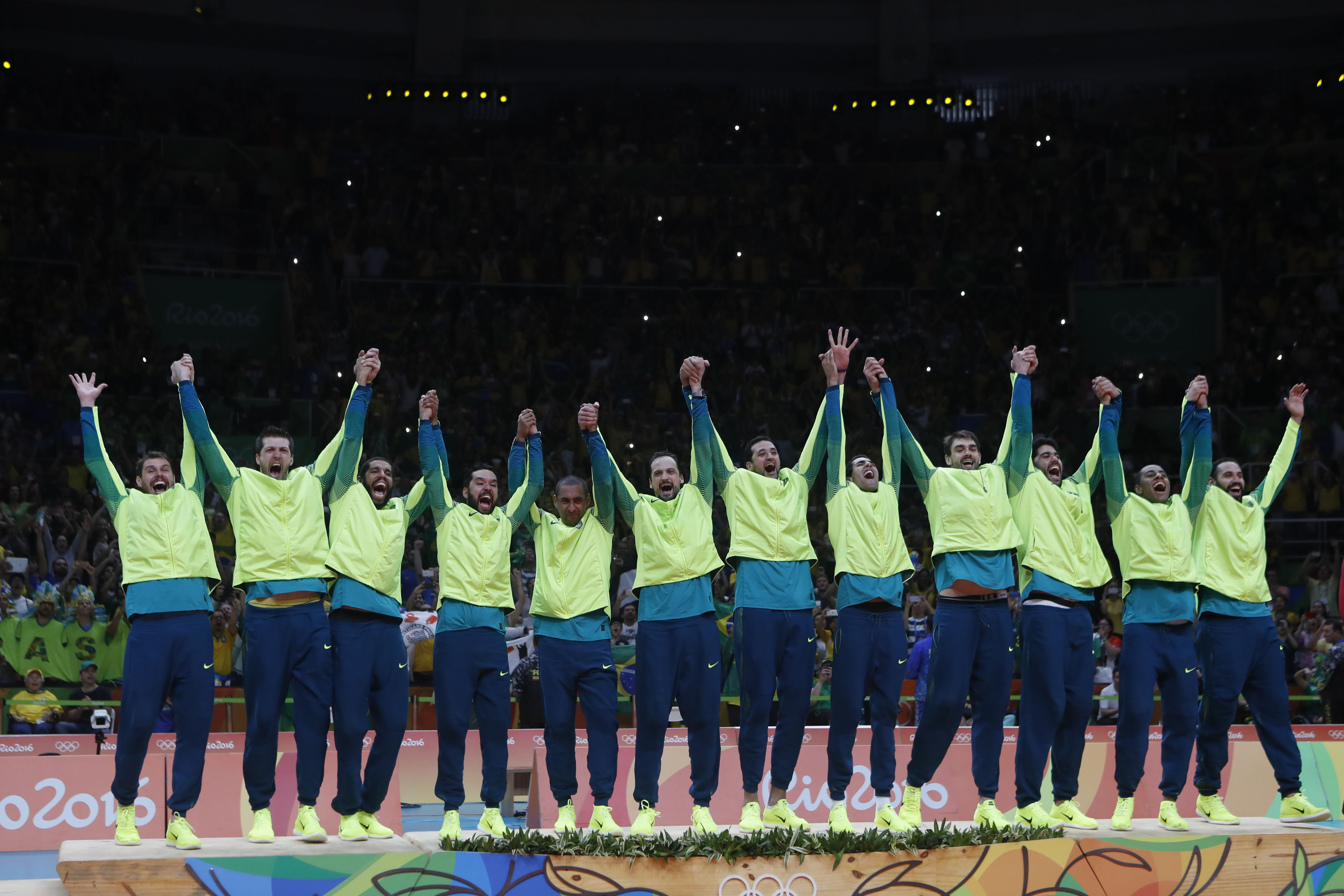
Medal ceremony - 2016 Olympic Champions

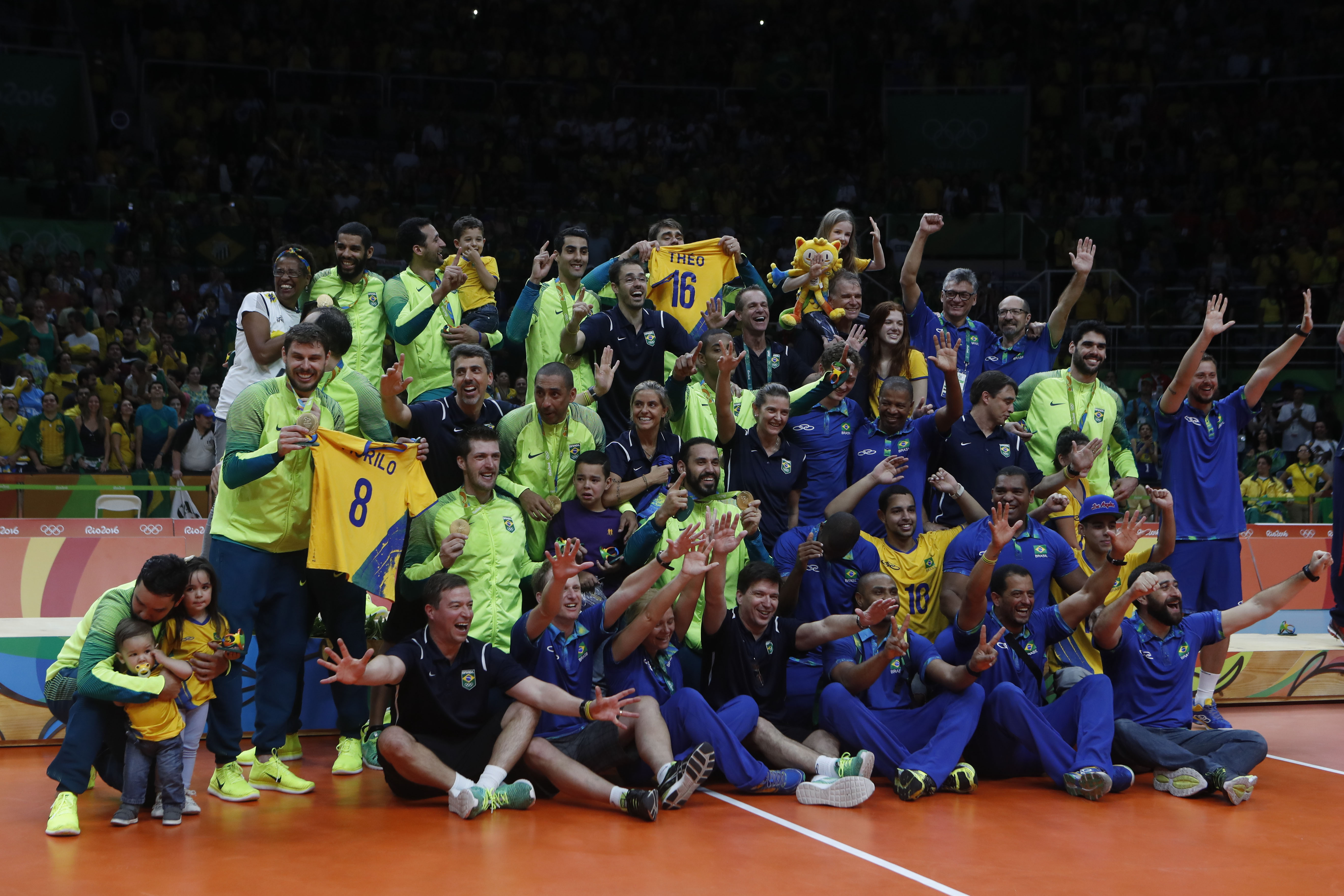
Medal ceremony - 2016 Olympic Champions

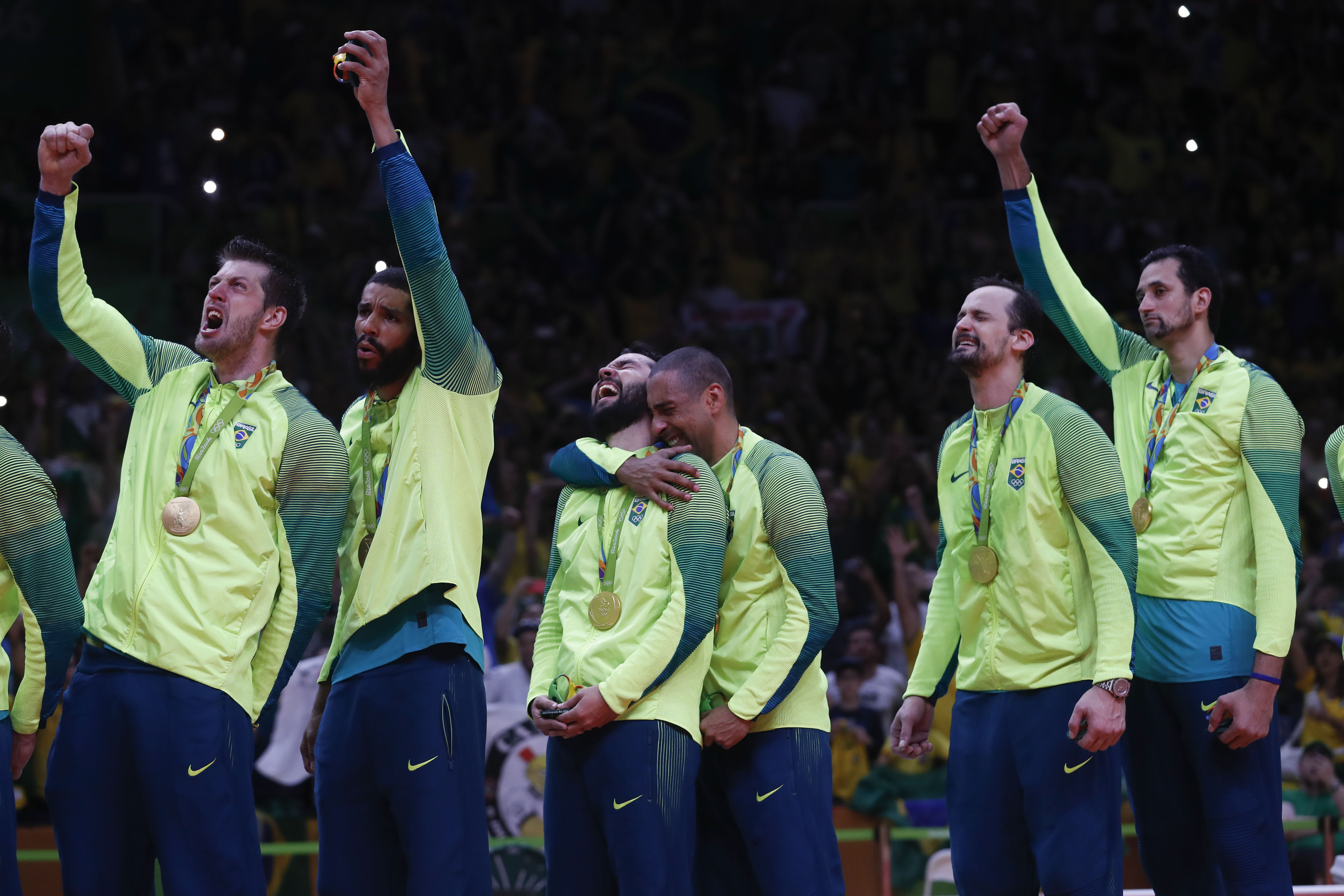
Medal ceremony - 2016 Olympic Champions

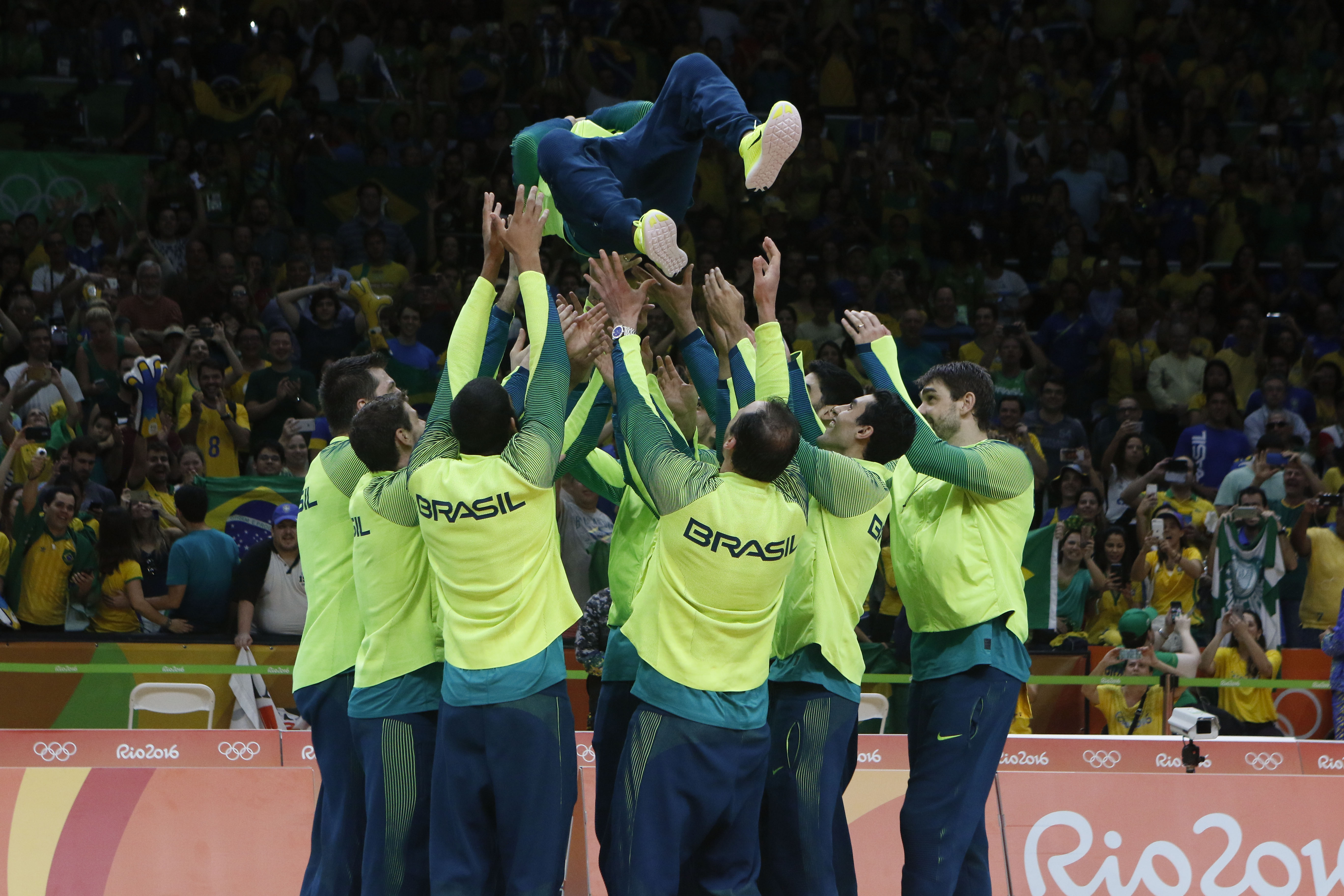
Medal ceremony - 2016 Olympic Champions

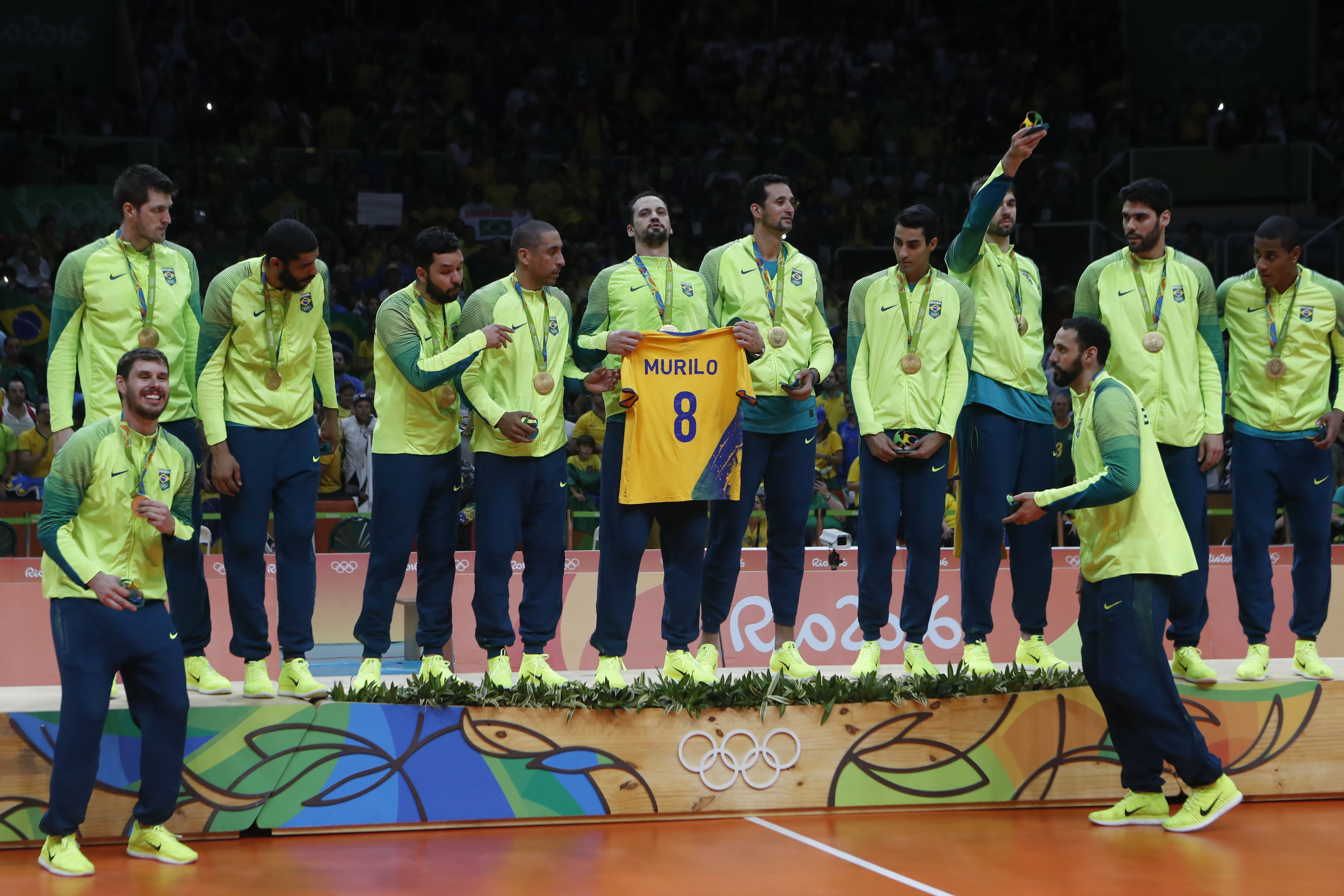
Medal ceremony - 2016 Olympic Champions

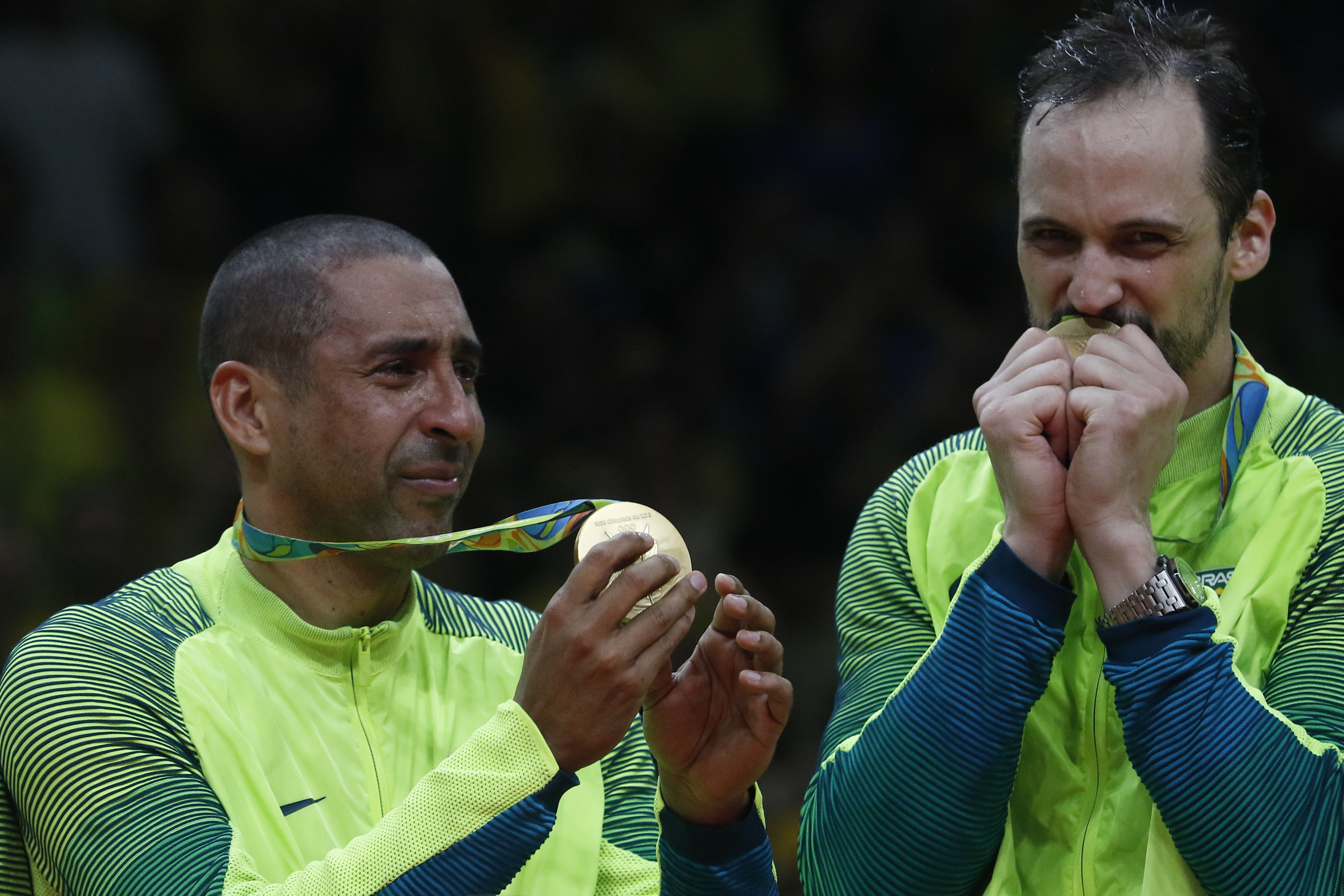
Medal ceremony - 2016 Olympic Champions

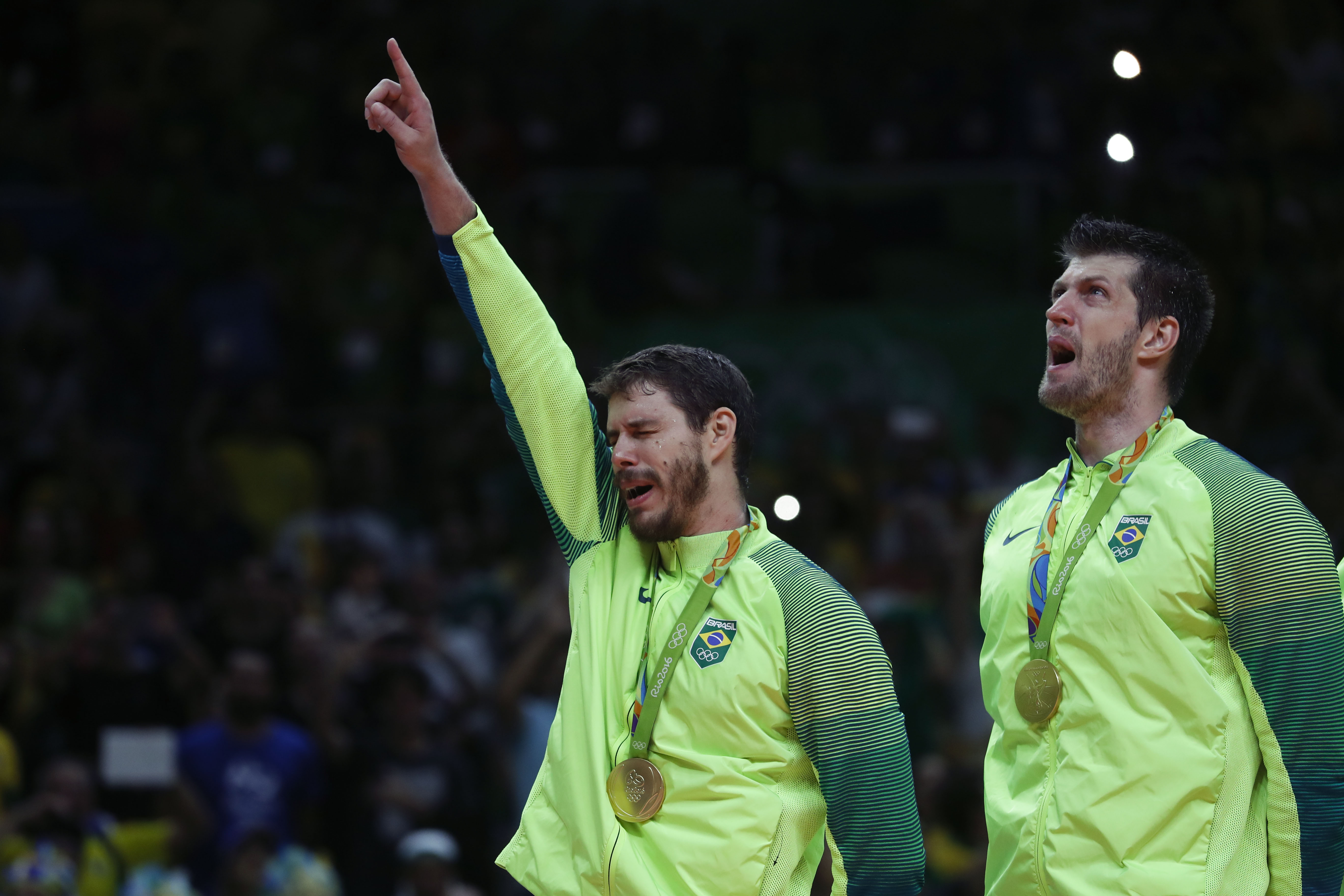
Medal ceremony - 2016 Olympic Champions

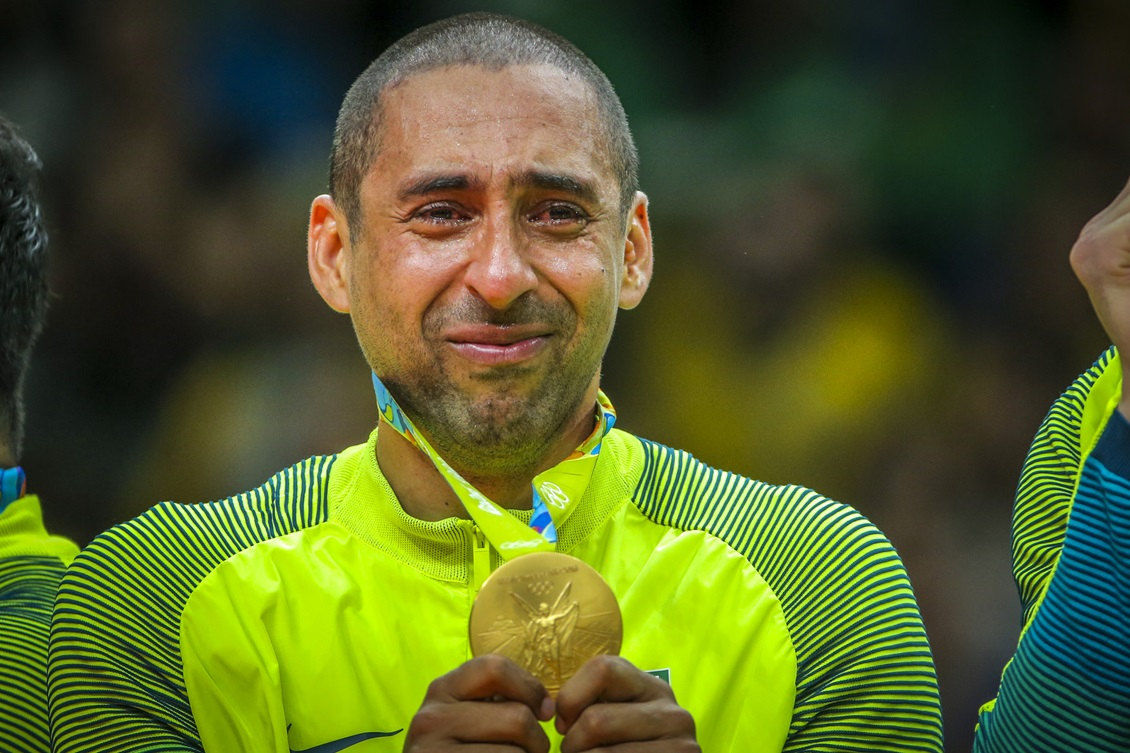
Medal ceremony - 2016 Olympic Champions

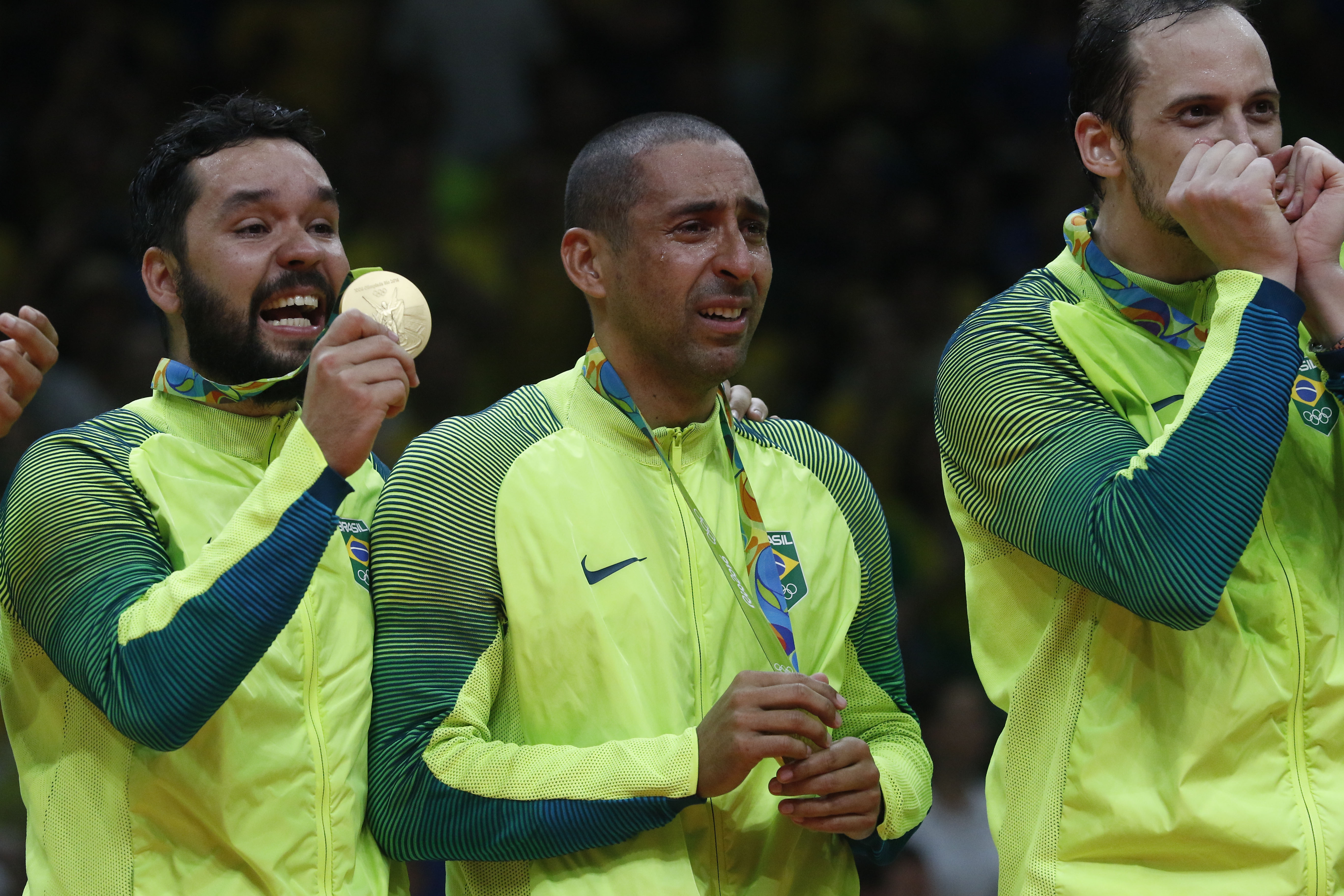
Medal ceremony - 2016 Olympic Champions

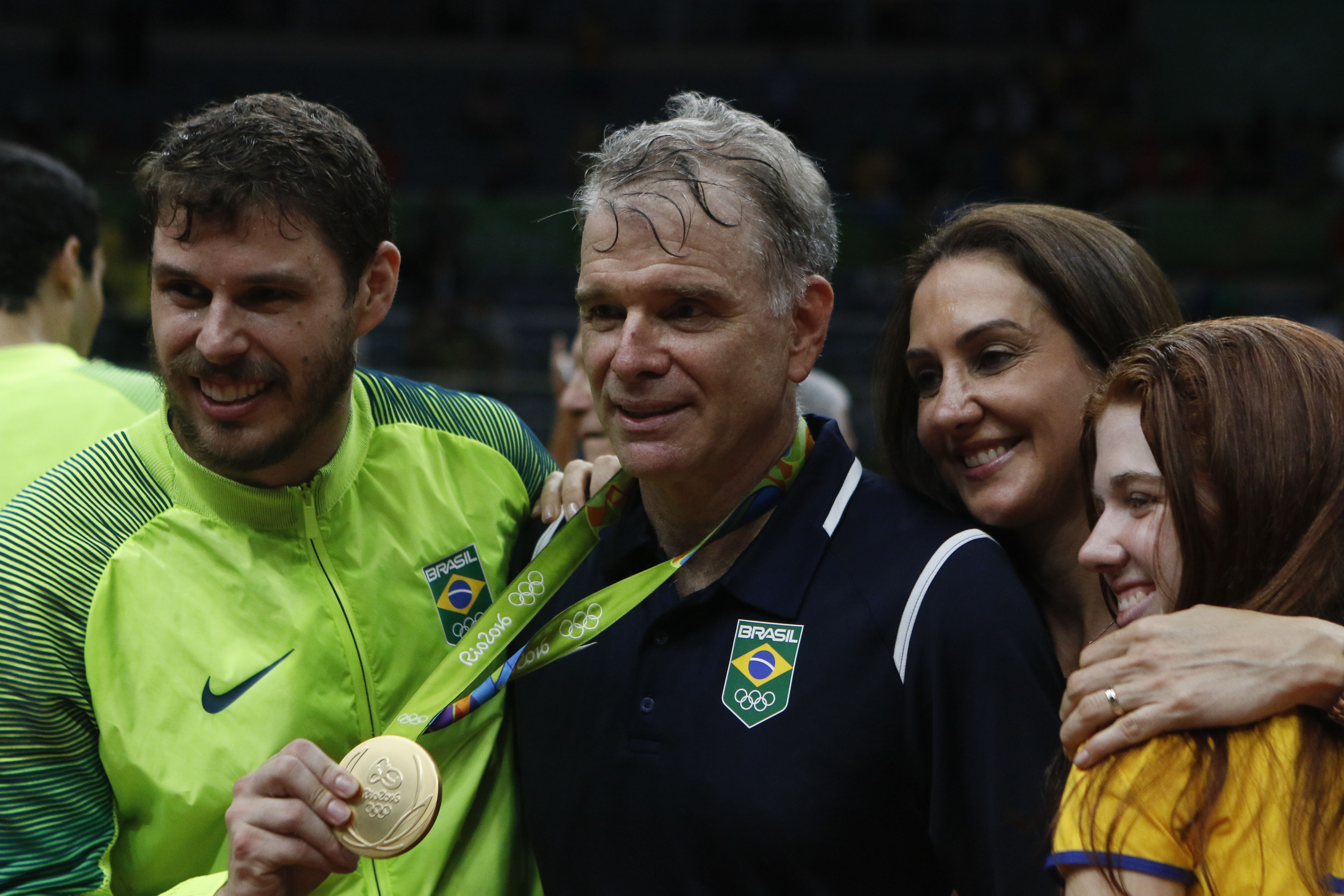
Medal ceremony - 2016 Olympic Champions

== Fans ==
=== Records ===
Incidentally, the Maracanã Stadium holds the all-time volleyball attendance record when 95,000 turned out to watch Brazil beat the USSR in an open-air friendly game in 1983.

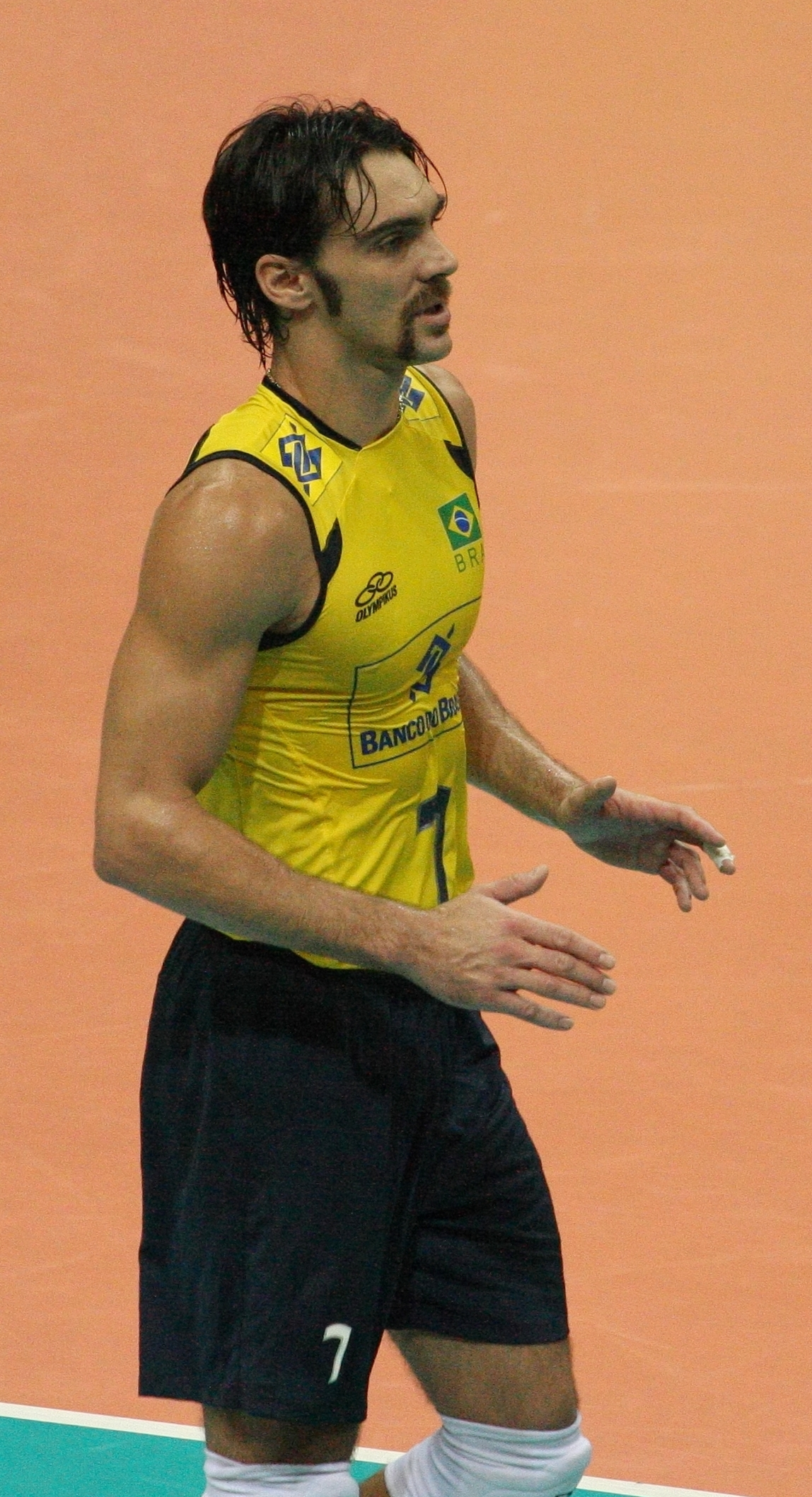
Giba Player 1995–2012

== Stadium ==
Ginásio do Maracanãzinho and Ginásio Municipal Tancredo Neves are Brazil's national team training and hosting venues.

== Kit providers ==
The table below shows the history of kit providers for the Brazil national volleyball team.

Period	Kit provider
2000–2016	Olympikus
2017–2022	Asics
2023–	Body Work

=== Sponsorship ===
Primary sponsors include: main sponsors like Banco do Brasil, Nivea, other sponsors: Globoesporte, Gatorade, Gol Transportes Aereos, Delta Air Lines, Mikasa, Ernst & Young and Asics.

== Media ==
Brazil's matches and friendlies are currently televised by SporTV and Globo.

== See also ==
- Brazil women's national volleyball team
- Brazil men's national under-23 volleyball team
- Brazil men's national under-21 volleyball team
- Brazil men's national under-19 volleyball team
