= Ya budu =

2009 single by 5sta Family feat. 23:45

Single by 5sta Family, 23:45
- Language: Russian
- Released: July 16, 2009
- Genre: Pop; R&B
- Length: 3:03

"Ya budu" (Russian: «Я буду») is a song written by Russian singer Olga Zasulsky, producer Oleg Mironov and members of the group 23:45, Grigory Bogachev and Georgy Yukhanov. It was released as single by 5sta Family and 23:45.

The song charted highly in Russia, becoming one of the most successful songs of 2009. The members of "5ivesta Family" themselves credited the song's success to the "skillful" musical production and the memorable ending chorus." They also praised the "painstaking" work of their producer, Oleg Mironov.

== Release ==
According to Russkoye Radio, the presentation of the single was created in order to refute rumors that the song was performed by Kristina Orbakaitė.

== Commercial success ==
By the end of 2009, the single went platinum (as a ringtone) in Russia with sales of 200 thousand copies.

== Awards ==
Year	Award	Category	Result
2009	ZD Awards	Breakthrough of the year	Nominated
2010	God of Ether 2010	Radio hit duet	Won
2010	Muz-TV	Best song	Nominated
2010	Muz-TV	Breakthrough of the year	Nominated
2010	Muz-TV	Best duet	Nominated
2010	Golden Gramophone 2010	Golden Gramophone statute	Won
