= Alexander Alexandrov =

Alexander Alexandrov or Aleksandr Aleksandrov may refer to:

== Sports ==
- Aleksandar Aleksandrov (footballer, born 1975), known as Alex, Bulgarian footballer
- Aleksandar Aleksandrov (footballer, born April 1986), Bulgarian footballer
- Aleksandar Aleksandrov (footballer, born July 1986), Bulgarian footballer
- Aleksandar Aleksandrov (footballer, born 1994), Bulgarian footballer
- Aleksandar Aleksandrov (rower) (born 1990), Azerbaijani rower
- Aleksandar Aleksandrov (boxer) (born 1984), Bulgarian Olympic boxer
- Alexander Alexandrov (gymnastics coach) (born 1950), Russian gymnastics coach
- Aleksandar Aleksandrov (volleyball) (born 1944), Bulgarian Olympic volleyball player

== Others ==
- Aleksandr Aleksandrov (mathematician) (1912–1999), Russian mathematician and physicist
- Alexander Andreevich Alexandrov (born Nadezhda Durova; 1783–1866), Russian military officer and writer
- Aleksandr Pavlovich Aleksandrov (born 1943), Russian cosmonaut
- Aleksandr Panayotov Aleksandrov (born 1951), Bulgarian cosmonaut
- Alexander Vasilyevich Alexandrov (1883–1946), Russian composer
