= Jorge de Souza =

Jorge de Souza can refer to:

- Jorge de Souza (footballer)
- Jorge de Souza (volleyball)
