= Stoyan Stoyanov (disambiguation) =

Stoyan Stoyanov (1913–1997) was a Bulgarian fighter ace of World War II.

Stoyan Stoyanov may also refer to:

- Stoyan Stoyanov (gymnast) (born 1931), Bulgarian Olympic gymnast
- Stoyan Stoyanov (rower) (born 1956), Bulgarian Olympic rower
- Stoyan Stoyanov (volleyball) (born 1947), Bulgarian Olympic volleyball player
- Stoyan Stoyanov (wrestler) (born 1968), Bulgarian Olympic wrestler
