= Huybrechts =

Huybrechts is a surname.

Notable people with the name include:

== Sport ==
- Hugo Huybrechts (born 1945), Belgian volleyball player
- Kim Huybrechts (born 1985), Belgian darts player
- Léon Huybrechts (1876–1956), Belgian sailor
- Louis Huybrechts (1875–deceased), Belgian sailor
- Maria Huybrechts (1930–2023), Belgian swimmer
- Ronny Huybrechts (born 1965), Belgian darts player

== Other ==
- Albert Huybrechts (1899–1938), Belgian composer
- Daniel Huybrechts (born 1966), German mathematician
