= Volleyball at the 2023 Pan American Games – Men's volleyball team squads =

== Argentina ==
The following 12 players were named in the Argentina squad, which was announced on 29 October 2023.

No.	Pos.	Player	Date of birth (age)	Club
		Demian Gonzalez		(Brazil) Vôlei Renata
		Bruno Lima		(Brazil) Vôlei Renata
		Agustín Gallardo		(Argentina) Mutual Policia de Formosa
		Facundo Conte		(Argentina) Ciudad Vóley
		Gustavo Maciel		(Argentina) Ciudad Vóley
		Nicolás Lazo		(Argentina) Ciudad Vóley
		Marcos Richards		(Argentina) Mutual Policia de Formosa
		Tobias Scarpa		(Argentina) Mutual Policia de Formosa
		Ezequiel Vazquez		(Argentina) Monteros
		Sergio Soria		(Switzerland) Lausanne UC
		Mauro Zelayeta		(Spain) CV Teruel
		Mauro Balagué		(Switzerland) Lausanne UC

== Brazil ==
The following 12 players were named in the Brazil squad, which was announced on 29 October 2023.

No.	Pos.	Player	Date of birth (age)	Club
		Judson Nunes		(Brazil) Suzano Vôlei
		Otávio Pinto		(Brazil) Sada Cruzeiro
		Matheus Gonçalves		(Brazil) Farma Conde Vôlei São José
		Adriano Cavalcante		(Brazil) Vôlei Renata
		Thiery Nascimento		(Brazil) SESI Bauru
		Henrique Honorato		(Brazil) Itambé Minas
		Thiago Veloso		(Brazil) SESI Bauru
		Maicon França		(Brazil) Uberlândia Vôlei/Araguari
		Maique Nascimento		(Brazil) Itambé Minas
		Darlan Souza		(Brazil) SESI Bauru
		Felipe Roque		(Brazil) Farma Conde Vôlei São José
		Lukas Bergmann		(Brazil) SESI Bauru

== Chile ==
The following 12 players were named in the Chile squad, which was announced on 29 October 2023.

No.	Pos.	Player	Date of birth (age)	Club
		Esteban Villarreal		(Spain) CD Cisneros Alter
		Vicente Ibarra		(United States) Purdue Fort Wayne Mastodons
		Gabriel Araya		(Greece) AS Kerkis
		Tomás Parraguirre		(Spain) Arona Tenerife Sur
		Vicente Parraguirre		(Argentina) Ciudad Vóley
		Tomás Gago		(United States) Purdue Fort Wayne Mastodons
		Sebastián Albornoz		(Spain) Arona Tenerife Sur
		Dusan Bonacic		(Argentina) Ciudad Vóley
		Vicente Mardones		(United States) Limestone Saints
		Matias Jadue		(Argentina) Deportes La Rioja
		Vicente Valenzuela		(Chile) Club St. Thomas Morus
		Jaime Bravo		(Chile) Full Volley

== Colombia ==
The following 12 players were named in the Colombia squad, which was announced on 29 October 2023.

No.	Pos.	Player	Date of birth (age)	Club
		Jharold Caicedo		(Portugal) SC Caldas
		Juan Estupiñan		(Finland) Tuto Volley
		Gustavo Larrahondo		(Israel) Hapoel Menashe-Hadera
		Daniel Aponza		(Slovenia) Calcit Volley
		Santiago Ruiz		(Colombia) Seleccion Antioquia
		Andrés Piza		(Cyprus) Enosis Neon Paralimni
		Juan Camilo Ambuila		
		Jhon Cuello		(Spain) CV Sayre Bulcan Arte
		Leandro Mejía		(Switzerland) Volley Näfels
		Rossvuelt Ríos		(Colombia) Valle Cali
		Jorge Mesa		(Colombia) Seleccion Antioquia

== Cuba ==
The following 12 players were named in the Cuba squad, which was announced on 29 October 2023.

No.	Pos.	Player	Date of birth (age)	Club
		José Massó		(Germany) VfB Friedrichshafen
		Christian Thondike		(Turkey) Rams Global Cizre Belediyespor
		Yusniel Martí		(Cuba) Pinar del Rio
		Yonder Garcia		(Egypt) Al Ahly
		Alejandro González		(Czech Republic) VK České Budějovice
		Miguel Gutierrez		(Italy) Prisma Volley
		Liván Taboada		(Romania) VM Zalău
		Jakdiel Contreras		(Cuba) Mayabeque
		Miguel Angel Lopez		(Brazil) Sada Cruzeiro
		Alain Gorguet		Santiago de Cuba
		Adrian Chirino		(Cuba) Camaguey
		Thiago Suarez		(Romania) VM Zalău

== Dominican Republic ==
The following 12 players were named in the Dominican Republic squad, which was announced on 29 October 2023.

No.	Pos.	Player	Date of birth (age)	Club
		Juan José de Jesus		(Dominican Republic) Club Mauricio Baéz
		Hector Alexis Cruz		(Libya) Al-Nasr
		Luther Rosário		(Dominican Republic) Guerreros Volleyball
		Moises Ortiz		(Dominican Republic) Club Mauricio Baéz
		Francisco Arredondo		
		Adrian Figueroa		
		Rafael Burgos		Puerto Rico Pythons
		Henry López		(Dominican Republic) Los Santos de San Lazaro
		Henry Tapia		
		Enger Mieses		(Dominican Republic) Guerreros Volleyball
		Ezequiel Toribio		(Dominican Republic) Club Bameso
		Wilfrido Hernández		(Romania) SCM Craiova

== Mexico ==
The following 12 players were named in the Mexico squad, which was announced on 29 October 2023.

No.	Pos.	Player	Date of birth (age)	Club
		Mauro Fuentes		(Israel) MS Eilabun
		Miguel Angel Garcia		
		Angel Ivan Dominguez		(Mexico) Seleccion de Nuevo León
		Luis Hernández Baca		(Greece) AOP Kifisiás
		Jorge Ariel Hernández		(Mexico) Baja California
		Josué López Ríos		(France) Narbonne Volley
		Hiram Bravo		(Mexico) Mezcaleros Voleibol
		Victor Manuel Parra		(Mexico) Mezcaleros Voleibol
		Yasutaka Sanay		(Mexico) Mezcaleros Voleibol
		Edgar Mendoza		(Mexico) Nayarit Voleibol
		Axel Tellez		(Spain) CV Teruel
		Brandon Lopez		(Mexico) Mezcaleros Voleibol

== Puerto Rico ==
The following 12 players were named in the Puerto Rico squad, which was announced on 29 October 2023.

No.	Pos.	Player	Date of birth (age)	Club
		Arnel Cabrera		(Puerto Rico) Mets de Guaynabo
		Arnaldo Torres		(Puerto Rico) Plataneros de Corozal
		Kevin López		(Puerto Rico) Changos de Naranjito
		Ismael Alomar		(Puerto Rico) Caribes de San Sebastián
		Janluar Figueroa		(United States) Saint Francis High School
		Jamal Carballo		(United States) Fairleigh Dickinson Knights
		Howard García		(Puerto Rico) Cafeteros de Yauco
		Antonio Feliciano Bengoa		(United States) NJIT Highlanders
		Omar Hoyos		(United States) George Mason Patriots
		Jonathan Rodríguez		(Puerto Rico) Changos de Naranjito
		Kevin Rodríguez		(Finland) Savo Volley
		Pelegrín Vargas		(Puerto Rico) Caribes de San Sebastián
