= Dirickx =

Dirickx is a Belgian surname. Notable people with the surname include:

- Henri Dirickx (1927–2018), Belgian international footballer
- Frauke Dirickx (born 1980), Belgian volleyball player

== See also ==
- Dierckx
