= Eduardo Jiménez =

Eduardo Jiménez may refer to:

- Eduardo Jiménez de Aréchaga, Uruguayan jurist
- Eduardo Jiménez (baseball), Venezuelan baseball pitcher
- Eduardo Jiménez (volleyball), Mexican volleyball player
- Eduardo Jiménez (sport shooter), Spanish sports shooter
