= Euxoa excogita =

Scientific classification
- Domain: Eukaryota
- Kingdom: Animalia
- Phylum: Arthropoda
- Class: Insecta
- Order: Lepidoptera
- Superfamily: Noctuoidea
- Family: Noctuidae
- Genus: Euxoa
- Species: E. excogita

Binomial name
- Euxoa excogita (Smith, 1900)

Synonyms
- Carneades excogita Smith, 1900

Species of moth

Euxoa excogita is a moth of the family Noctuidae. It is found from British Columbia, south to California. It has also been recorded from Colorado.

Euxoa excogita was formerly considered a subspecies of Euxoa brunneigera.
