= Loya =

Surname

Loya is a surname. It may refer to:

- Brijgopal Harkishan Loya (1966–2014), Indian judge
- Consuelo Argüelles Loya (born 1977), Mexican politician
- Craig Loya (born 1977), American bishop
- Dionisio Loya Plancarte (born 1955), Mexican drug lord
- E. Javier Loya (born 1969), Mexican-American businessman
- Jesús Loya (born 1946), Mexican volleyball player
- Joe Loya (born 1961), American writer and bank robber
- Mariana Loya (born 1979), American beauty queen
- Oscar Loya (born 1979), American singer and actor
- Raul Loya (1938–2015), American labor activist

== See also ==
- Euxoa loya, a moth
- Fred Loya Insurance, American car insurance company
- Loya jirga, type of assembly in Afghanistan
- Loya Paktia, a region of Afghanistan
