= Dierickx =

Dierickx is a Dutch patronymic surname most common in Belgium and based on a short form of Diederik. People with this surname include:

- André Dierickx (born 1946), Belgian cyclist
- Henri Dierickx, Belgian sport wrestler
- Ludo Dierickx (1929–2009), Belgian politician and academic
- Marc Dierickx (born 1954), Belgian cyclist
- Matijs Dierickx (born 1991), Belgian badminton player
- Mike Dierickx (born 1973), Belgian DJ
- Wine Dierickx (born 1978), Belgian actress

== See also ==
- Volcxken Diericx (fl.1570–1600), Flemish printmaker and publisher
- Dierckx, surname of the same origin
