= Dierckx =

Dierckx or Dierkx is a Dutch patronymic surname based on a short form of Diederik. It is most common in the Belgian province of Antwerp. People with this surname include:

- Leo Dierckx (born 1943), Belgian volleyball player
- Kaatje Dierkx (1866–1900), Dutch canonized nun and missionary in China known as Marie-Adolphine
- Octave Dierckx (1882–1955), Belgian liberal and politician
- Pieter Franciscus Dierckx (1871–1950), Belgian impressionist painter
- Tuur Dierckx (born 1995), Belgian football striker

== See also ==
- Léon Dierx (1838–1912), French poet
- Dierickx, surname of the same origin
