= Fernand Walder =

Belgian volleyball player (born 1946)

Personal information
- Nationality: Belgian
- Born: 5 April 1946 (age 78); Leuven, Belgium

Sport
- Sport: Volleyball

Fernand Walder (born 5 April 1946) is a Belgian volleyball player. He competed in the men's tournament at the 1968 Summer Olympics.
