= Aleksandar Trenev =

Bulgarian volleyball player (born 1945)

Personal information
- Nationality: Bulgarian
- Born: 19 November 1945 (age 79); Sofia, Bulgaria

Sport
- Sport: Volleyball

Aleksandar Trenev (Bulgarian: Александър Тренев; born 19 November 1945) is a Bulgarian volleyball player. He competed at the 1968 Summer Olympics and the 1972 Summer Olympics.
