= Sérgio Pinheiro =

Brazilian volleyball player (born 1944)

Personal information
- Born: 11 June 1944 (age 80); Rio de Janeiro, Brazil

Sport
- Sport: Volleyball

Sérgio Pinheiro (born 11 June 1944) is a Brazilian volleyball player. He competed in the men's tournament at the 1968 Summer Olympics.
