= César Osuna =

Mexican volleyball player (born 1948)

Personal information
- Born: 11 December 1948 (age 76); Tecate, Mexico

Sport
- Sport: Volleyball

César Osuna (born 11 December 1948) is a Mexican volleyball player. He competed in the men's tournament at the 1968 Summer Olympics.
