= Milcho Milev =

Bulgarian volleyball player (born 1941)

Personal information
- Nationality: Bulgarian
- Born: 11 September 1941 (age 83); Haskovo, Bulgaria

Sport
- Sport: Volleyball

Milcho Milev (Bulgarian: Милчо Милев, born 11 September 1941) is a Bulgarian volleyball player. He competed in the men's tournament at the 1968 Summer Olympics.
