= Dinko Atanasov =

Bulgarian volleyball player

Personal information
- Nationality: Bulgarian
- Born: 18 September 1938 (age 86); Sliven, Bulgaria

Sport
- Sport: Volleyball

Dinko Atanasov (Bulgarian: Динко Атанасов, born 18 September 1938) is a Bulgarian volleyball player. He competed in the men's tournament at the 1968 Summer Olympics.
