= Willem Bossaerts =

Belgian volleyball player (born 1941)

Personal information
- Nationality: Belgian
- Born: 13 January 1941 (age 84); Merksem, Belgium

Sport
- Sport: Volleyball

Willem Bossaerts (born 13 January 1941) is a Belgian volleyball player. He competed in the men's tournament at the 1968 Summer Olympics.
