= Tadeusz Siwek =

Polish volleyball player (1935–1997)

Personal information
- Nationality: Polish
- Born: 9 October 1935; Chorzów, Poland
- Died: May 1997; Katowice, Poland

Sport
- Sport: Volleyball

Tadeusz Siwek (9 October 1935 – May 1997) was a Polish volleyball player. He competed in the men's tournament at the 1968 Summer Olympics.
