= Leopoldo Reyna =

Mexican volleyball player (born 1947)

Personal information
- Born: 20 December 1947 (age 77); Mexico City, Mexico

Sport
- Sport: Volleyball

Leopoldo Reyna (born 20 December 1947) is a Mexican volleyball player. He competed in the men's tournament at the 1968 Summer Olympics.
