= Carlos Barron =

Mexican volleyball player (born 1942)

Personal information
- Born: 15 January 1942 (age 83); Cuernavaca, Mexico

Sport
- Sport: Volleyball

Carlos Barron (born 15 January 1942) is a Mexican volleyball player. He competed in the men's tournament at the 1968 Summer Olympics.
