= Eduardo Sixtos =

Mexican volleyball player

Personal information
- Born: 28 August 1939 (age 85); Irapuato, Mexico

Sport
- Sport: Volleyball

Eduardo Sixtos (born 28 August 1939) is a Mexican volleyball player. He competed in the men's tournament at the 1968 Summer Olympics.
