= Jozef Mol =

Belgian volleyball player (born 1950)

Personal information
- Nationality: Belgian
- Born: 22 October 1950 (age 74); Antwerp, Belgium

Sport
- Sport: Volleyball

Jozef Mol (born 22 October 1950) is a Belgian volleyball player. He competed in the men's tournament at the 1968 Summer Olympics.
