= Antonio Barbet =

Mexican volleyball player (born 1946)

Personal information
- Born: 10 May 1946 (age 78); Mexico City, Mexico

Sport
- Sport: Volleyball

Antonio Barbet (born 10 May 1946) is a Mexican volleyball player. He competed in the men's tournament at the 1968 Summer Olympics.
