= Joël Calva =

Mexican volleyball player (born 1943)

Personal information
- Born: 31 July 1943 (age 81); Mexico City, Mexico

Sport
- Sport: Volleyball

Joël Calva (born 31 July 1943) is a Mexican volleyball player. He competed in the men's tournament at the 1968 Summer Olympics.
