= Gramen Prinov =

Bulgarian volleyball player (born 1944)

Personal information
- Nationality: Bulgarian
- Born: 8 April 1944 (age 80); Kozloduy, Bulgaria

Sport
- Sport: Volleyball

Gramen Prinov (Bulgarian: Грамен Принов, born 8 April 1944) is a Bulgarian volleyball player. He competed in the men's tournament at the 1968 Summer Olympics.
