= Jorge de Souza (volleyball) =

Brazilian volleyball player (born 1945)

Personal information
- Born: 17 April 1945 Rio de Janeiro, Brazil
- Died: 1988 (aged 42–43)

Sport
- Sport: Volleyball

Jorge de Souza (17 April 1945 – 1988) was a Brazilian volleyball player. He competed in the men's tournament at the 1968 Summer Olympics.

== Career ==
Souza competed in the 1968 Summer Olympics in Mexico City, representing the Brazilian men’s national volleyball team. He took part in both preliminary and final-round matches. Continuing his international career, he won a bronze medal with the Brazilian national team at the 1971 Pan American Games.
