= Euxoa brunneigera =

Scientific classification
- Kingdom: Animalia
- Phylum: Arthropoda
- Class: Insecta
- Order: Lepidoptera
- Superfamily: Noctuoidea
- Family: Noctuidae
- Genus: Euxoa
- Species: E. brunneigera

Binomial name
- Euxoa brunneigera (Grote, 1876)

Synonyms
- Euxoa loya (Smith, 1900); Carneades loya Smith, 1900; Noctua monteclara Smith, 1906; Euxoa obsucra Hill, 1924

Species of moth

Euxoa brunneigera is a moth of the family Noctuidae. It is found in western North America from British Columbia, south to California. The wingspan is about 30 mm and it varies from grey to brown.
