= Lukas Bergmann =

Brazilian volleyball player (born 2004)

Personal information
- Full name: Lukas Felipe Bergmann
- Nationality: Brazilian
- Born: 25 March 2004 (age 22)
- Height: 204 cm (6 ft 8 in)
Honours
Men's volleyball
Representing Brazil
FIVB Nations League
Bronze medal – third place	2025 Ningbo

Lukas Felipe Bergmann (born 25 March 2004) is a Brazilian volleyball player. He represented Brazil at the 2024 Summer Olympics. He is the brother of Brazil women's national volleyball team player Júlia Bergmann.
