= Jesús Loya =

Mexican volleyball player (born 1946)

Personal information
- Born: 28 August 1946 (age 78); Chihuahua, Mexico

Sport
- Sport: Volleyball

Jesús Loya (born 28 August 1946) is a Mexican volleyball player. He competed in the men's tournament at the 1968 Summer Olympics.
