= Eduardo Jiménez (volleyball) =

Mexican volleyball player (born 1947)

Personal information
- Born: 11 April 1947 (age 77); Mexico City, Mexico

Sport
- Sport: Volleyball

Eduardo Jiménez (born 11 April 1947) is a Mexican volleyball player. He competed in the men's tournament at the 1968 Summer Olympics.
