= Aleksandar Aleksandrov (volleyball) =

Bulgarian volleyball player (born 1944)

Personal information
- Nationality: Bulgarian
- Born: 15 February 1944 (age 81); Lukovit, Bulgaria

Sport
- Sport: Volleyball

Aleksandar Aleksandrov (Bulgarian: Александър Александров; born 15 February 1944) is a Bulgarian volleyball player. He competed in the men's tournament at the 1968 Summer Olympics.
