= Stoyan Stoyanov (volleyball) =

Bulgarian volleyball player (born 1947)

Personal information
- Nationality: Bulgarian
- Born: 20 March 1947 (age 78); Losen, Bulgaria

Sport
- Sport: Volleyball

Stoyan Stoyanov (Bulgarian: Стоян Стоянов, born 20 March 1947) is a Bulgarian volleyball player. He competed in the men's tournament at the 1968 Summer Olympics.
