= Hugo Huybrechts =

Belgian volleyball player (born 1945)

Personal information
- Nationality: Belgian
- Born: 21 January 1945 (age 80); Zepperen, Belgium

Sport
- Sport: Volleyball

Hugo Huybrechts (born 21 January 1945) is a Belgian volleyball player. He competed in the men's tournament at the 1968 Summer Olympics.
