= Leo Dierckx =

Belgian volleyball player (born 1943)

Personal information
- Nationality: Belgian
- Born: 28 March 1943 (age 81); Leuven, Belgium

Sport
- Sport: Volleyball

Leo Dierckx (born 28 March 1943) is a Belgian volleyball player. He competed in the men's tournament at the 1968 Summer Olympics.
