= 2024 Men's Pan-American Volleyball Cup =

Tournament details
- Host country: Dominican Republic
- City: Santo Domingo
- Dates: 14–21 July
- Teams: 10 (from 2 confederations)
- Venue: 1 (in 1 host city)

Final positions
- Champions: Canada (2nd title)
- Runners-up: United States
- Third place: Puerto Rico
- Fourth place: Cuba

Tournament awards
- MVP: Jesse Elser (CAN)

Tournament statistics
- Matches played: 31

The 2024 Men's Pan-American Volleyball Cup, officially named 2024 NORCECA XVII Panamerican Men Cup, was the 17th edition of the Men's Pan-American Volleyball Cup, the annual volleyball tournament organized by the Pan-American Volleyball Union (UPV) that brings together the NORCECA and Confederación Sudamericana de Voleibol (CSV) men's national teams. It was held in Santo Domingo, Dominican Republic from 14 to 21 July 2024.

Canada were the defending champions.

== Participating teams ==
A maximum of 10 national teams could qualify for the tournament based on their respective continental ranking plus the points earned during their participation in the 2023 Pan-American Cup, as follows: the host nation, the top 5 teams in the NORCECA Continental Ranking as of 1 January 2024 and the top 4 teams in the CSV Continental Ranking that confirmed their participation. Eventually, there were 7 NORCECA teams and 3 CSV teams that confirmed their participation, with Guatemala entering the tournament after the declination of the eligible teams from CSV needed to complete the line of 10 teams.

The following were the teams eligible to participate in the tournament (teams that confirmed their participation marked in bold and confederation ranking, if given, shown in brackets):

NORCECA (North, Central America and Caribbean Volleyball Confederation)

- **United States** (1)
- **Canada** (2, holders)
- **Cuba** (3)
- **Mexico** (4)
- **Puerto Rico** (5)
- **Dominican Republic** (6, hosts)
- **Guatemala** (7, not originally considered eligible)

CSV (South American Volleyball Confederation)

- ~~Brazil~~
- ~~Argentina~~
- **Chile**
- **Colombia**
- ~~Venezuela~~
- **Peru**

=== Squads ===
Each national team had to register a squad with a minimum of 12 and a maximum of 14 players.

== Competition format ==
In the Pan-American Cups the competition format depends on the number of participating teams. With 10 teams, two groups of five teams each were formed. The pool standing procedure was as follows:

1. Number of matches won;
2. Match points;
  - Match won 3–0: 3 match points for the winner, 0 match points for the loser
  - Match won 3–1: 3 match points for the winner, 0 match points for the loser
  - Match won 3–2: 2 match points for the winner, 1 match point for the loser
3. Points ratio;
4. Sets ratio;
5. If the tie continues between two teams: result of the last match between the tied teams;
6. If the tie continues between three or more teams: a new classification would be made taking into consideration only the matches between involved teams.

The winner of each group advanced directly to the semi-finals, while the runners-up and the third placed teams advanced to the quarter-finals.

=== Groups composition ===
Teams were distributed into two groups of five teams. As hosts, Dominican Republic had the right to choose the group in which to be placed and were assigned to the head of its group (Group B). The remaining teams were distributed into the groups according to their position in the NORCECA and CSV Continental Rankings (as of 1 January 2024) and taking into account the points earned in the 2023 Pan-American Cup, following the serpentine system and starting with the highest-ranked NORCECA team as head of the remaining group (Group A)

Group A	Group B
United States	Dominican Republic
Canada	Colombia
Chile	Cuba
Mexico	Peru
Puerto Rico	Guatemala

Dominican Republic also had the right to choose their first match in the preliminary round and propose the times and order of all matches.

== Preliminary round ==
All match times are local times, DOT (UTC−4), as listed by NORCECA.

=== Group A ===
Pos	Team	Pld	W	L	Pts	SW	SL	SR	SPW	SPL	SPR	Qualification
1	Canada	4	4	0	11	12	2	6.000	335	286	1.171	Semi-finals
2	United States	4	3	1	10	11	5	2.200	381	331	1.151	Quarter-finals
3	Puerto Rico	4	1	3	4	7	9	0.778	327	331	0.988	Quarter-finals
4	Chile	4	1	3	4	5	10	0.500	319	348	0.917	7th–10th semi-finals
5	Mexico	4	1	3	2	4	11	0.364	290	356	0.815	7th–10th semi-finals

Source: NORCECA

Date	Time		Score		Set 1	Set 2	Set 3	Set 4	Set 5	Total	Report
14 Jul	13:00	Chile	2–3	Mexico	22–25	23–25	25–19	25–15	13–15	108–99	P2 P3
14 Jul	17:00	United States	3–1	Puerto Rico	25–21	25–18	29–31	25–18		104–88	P2 P3
15 Jul	13:00	Canada	3–0	Puerto Rico	25–22	25–21	25–23			75–66	P2 P3
15 Jul	17:00	United States	3–1	Mexico	25–19	23–25	25–20	25–18		98–82	P2 P3
16 Jul	13:00	Chile	3–1	Puerto Rico	27–25	28–26	17–25	25–22		97–98	P2 P3
16 Jul	17:00	United States	2–3	Canada	25–19	20–25	27–25	23–25	9–15	104–109	P2 P3
17 Jul	13:00	Mexico	0–3	Canada	15–25	19–25	20–25			54–75	P2 P3
17 Jul	17:00	United States	3–0	Chile	25–23	25–14	25–15			75–52	P2 P3
18 Jul	13:00	Mexico	0–3	Puerto Rico	17–25	22–25	16–25			55–75	P2 P3
18 Jul	17:00	Canada	3–0	Chile	25–19	25–19	26–24			76–62	P2 P3

=== Group B ===
Pos	Team	Pld	W	L	Pts	SW	SL	SR	SPW	SPL	SPR	Qualification
1	Cuba	4	4	0	12	12	2	6.000	339	270	1.256	Semi-finals
2	Colombia	4	3	1	9	9	5	1.800	341	306	1.114	Quarter-finals
3	Dominican Republic (H)	3	2	1	6	7	4	1.750	355	349	1.017	Quarter-finals
4	Peru	4	1	3	3	6	9	0.667	317	353	0.898	7th–10th semi-finals
5	Guatemala	4	0	4	0	0	12	0.000	226	300	0.753	7th–10th semi-finals

Source: NORCECA
(H) Host

Date	Time		Score		Set 1	Set 2	Set 3	Set 4	Set 5	Total	Report
14 Jul	15:00	Colombia	3–0	Guatemala	25–18	25–16	25–16			75–50	P2 P3
14 Jul	19:00	Dominican Republic	3–1	Peru	25–16	28–30	25–18	25–17		103–81	P2 P3
15 Jul	15:00	Cuba	3–0	Colombia	25–18	25–23	25–21			75–62	P2 P3
15 Jul	19:00	Peru	3–0	Guatemala	25–18	25–22	25–22			75–62	P2 P3
16 Jul	15:00	Cuba	3–1	Peru	16–25	25–17	25–17	25–19		91–78	P2 P3
16 Jul	19:00	Dominican Republic	3–0	Guatemala	25–22	25–19	25–22			75–63	P2 P3
17 Jul	15:00	Guatemala	0–3	Cuba	11–25	20–25	20–25			51–75	P2 P3
17 Jul	19:00	Dominican Republic	1–3	Colombia	18–25	26–28	27–25	27–29		98–107	P2 P3
18 Jul	15:00	Colombia	3–1	Peru	25–20	22–25	25–22	25–16		97–83	P2 P3
18 Jul	19:00	Dominican Republic	1–3	Cuba	18–25	25–23	23–25	13–25		79–98	P2 P3

== Final round ==
All match times are local times, DOT (UTC−4), as listed by NORCECA.

=== 7th–10th places ===
7th–10th semi-finals
19 July
4A	Chile	3
5B	Guatemala	0
19 July
4B	Peru	0
5A	Mexico	3

7th place match
20 July
Chile	3
Mexico	0
9th place match
20 July
Guatemala	1
Peru	3

==== 7th–10th semi-finals ====
Date	Time		Score		Set 1	Set 2	Set 3	Set 4	Set 5	Total	Report
19 Jul	13:00	Chile	3–0	Guatemala	25–16	25–20	25–22			75–58	P2 P3
19 Jul	15:00	Peru	0–3	Mexico	15–25	25–27	20–25			60–77	P2 P3

==== 9th place match ====
Date	Time		Score		Set 1	Set 2	Set 3	Set 4	Set 5	Total	Report
20 Jul	13:00	Guatemala	1–3	Peru	19–25	15–25	25–20	23–25		82–95	P2 P3

==== 7th place match ====
Date	Time		Score		Set 1	Set 2	Set 3	Set 4	Set 5	Total	Report
20 Jul	15:00	Chile	3–0	Mexico	25–22	25–20	25–18			75–60	P2 P3

=== 1st–6th places ===
Quarter-finals
19 July
2A	United States	3
3B	Dominican Republic	0
19 July
2B	Colombia	0
3A	Puerto Rico	3

Semi-finals
20 July
1B	Cuba	2
2A	United States	3
20 July
1A	Canada	3
3A	Puerto Rico	1
5th place match
21 July
Colombia	0
Dominican Republic	3

Final
21 July
United States	1
Canada	3
3rd place match
21 July
Cuba	1
Puerto Rico	3

==== Quarter-finals ====
Date	Time		Score		Set 1	Set 2	Set 3	Set 4	Set 5	Total	Report
19 Jul	17:00	Colombia	0–3	Puerto Rico	24–26	13–25	20–25			57–76	P2 P3
19 Jul	19:00	United States	3–0	Dominican Republic	25–21	25–21	25–20			75–62	P2 P3

==== Semi-finals ====
Date	Time		Score		Set 1	Set 2	Set 3	Set 4	Set 5	Total	Report
20 Jul	17:00	Cuba	2–3	United States	15–25	25–23	23–25	26–24	11–15	100–112	P2 P3
20 Jul	19:00	Canada	3–1	Puerto Rico	25–16	25–22	23–25	25–21		98–84	P2 P3

==== 5th place match ====
Date	Time		Score		Set 1	Set 2	Set 3	Set 4	Set 5	Total	Report
21 Jul	13:00	Colombia	0–3	Dominican Republic	22–25	19–25	24–26			65–76	P2 P3

==== 3rd place match ====
Date	Time		Score		Set 1	Set 2	Set 3	Set 4	Set 5	Total	Report
21 Jul	15:00	Cuba	1–3	Puerto Rico	26–28	17–25	25–16	22–25		90–94	P2 P3

==== Final ====
Date	Time		Score		Set 1	Set 2	Set 3	Set 4	Set 5	Total	Report
21 Jul	17:00	United States	1–3	Canada	24–26	24–26	28–26	19–25		95–103	P2 P3

== See also ==
- 2024 Women's Pan-American Volleyball Cup
