= Volleyball at the 2023 Pan American Games =

- Volleyball pictogram
- Venue: Arena Parque O'Higgins
- Start date: October 21, 2023
- End date: November 4, 2023
- No. of events: 2 (1 men, 1 women)
- Competitors: 192 from 8 nations

Volleyball competitions at the 2023 Pan American Games in Santiago, Chile are scheduled to be held from October 21 to November 4. The venue for the competition is the Arena Parque O'Higgins.

Each tournament will feature eight men's teams and eight women's teams, each with a maximum of 12 athletes. This indicates that 192 athletes will compete in total.

== Qualification ==
A total of eight men's teams and eight women's team will qualify to compete at the games in each tournament. The host nation (Chile) received automatic qualification in both tournaments. All other teams qualified through various tournaments.

=== Summary ===
Nation	Men's	Women's	Athletes
Argentina	Yes	Yes	24
Brazil	Yes	Yes	24
Chile	Yes	Yes	24
Colombia	Yes	Yes	24
Cuba	Yes	Yes	24
Dominican Republic	Yes	Yes	24
Mexico	Yes	Yes	24
Puerto Rico	Yes	Yes	24
Total: 8 NOCs	8	8	192

=== Men ===
Event	Dates	Location	Quota(s)	Qualified
Host nation	—N/a	—N/a	1	Chile
2021 Pan-American Cup	3–9 September	(Dominican Republic) Santo Domingo	1	Mexico
2021 Junior Pan American Games	26–30 November	(Colombia) Cali	2	Brazil; Dominican Republic
2022 Pan-American Cup	9–14 August	(Canada) Gatineau	1	Cuba
CSV Qualifying Tournament	20–24 September	(Chile) Santiago	2	Argentina; Colombia
2023 Pan-American Cup	13–21 August	(Mexico) Guadalajara	1	~~Canada~~; Puerto Rico
Total			8	

=== Women ===
Event	Dates	Location	Quota(s)	Qualified
Host nation	—N/a	—N/a	1	Chile
2021 Pan-American Cup	13–19 September	(Dominican Republic) Santo Domingo	1	Dominican Republic
2021 Junior Pan American Games	1–5 December	(Colombia) Cali	2	Brazil; Mexico
CSV Qualifying Tournament	7–11 August	(Argentina) San Juan	2	Argentina; Colombia
2023 Pan-American Cup	4–14 August	Puerto Rico	2	~~United States~~; Puerto Rico
Wildcard	–	–	1	Cuba
Total			8	

== Participating nations ==
Eight NOC's qualified teams. The numbers of participants qualified are in parentheses.

- Argentina (24)
- Brazil (24)
- Chile (24)
- Colombia (24)
- Cuba (24)
- Dominican Republic (24)
- Mexico (24)
- Puerto Rico (24)

== Medal summary ==
=== Medalists ===
Event	Gold	Silver	Bronze
Men's tournament	Brazil; Lukas Bergmann; Adriano Xavier; Maicon França; Matheus Gonçalves; Henrique Honorato; Maique Nascimento; Thiery Nascimento; Judson Nunes; Otávio Pinto; Felipe Roque; Darlan Souza; Thiago Veloso	Argentina; Mauro Balagué; Facundo Conte; Agustín Gallardo; Demian Gonzalez; Nicolás Lazo; Bruno Lima; Gustavo Maciel; Marcos Richards; Tobias Scarpa; Sergio Soria; Ezequiel Vazquez; Mauro Zelayeta	Colombia; Juan Camilo Ambuila; Daniel Aponza; Jharold Caicedo; Jhon Cuello; Juan Estupiñan; Gustavo Larrahondo; Leandro Mejía; Jorge Mesa; Andrés Piza; Rossvuelt Ríos; Santiago Ruiz
Women's tournament	Dominican Republic; Cándida Arias; Brenda Castillo; Bethania de la Cruz; Lisvel Elisa Eve; Gaila González; Niverka Marte; Brayelin Martínez; Jineiry Martínez; Larysmer Martínez; Yonkaira Peña; Vielka Peralta; Yokaty Pérez	Brazil; Naiane Rios; Maiara Basso; Larissa Besen; Tália Costa; Lorena Viezel; Carolina Leite; Tainara Santos; Sabrina Machado; Aline Segato; Luzia Nezzo; Laís Vasques; Helena Wenk	Mexico; Grecia Castro; Angela Muñoz; Karina Flores; Joseline Landeros; Arleth Márquez; Ivone Martínez; Karen Rivera; María Rodríguez; Daniela Siller; Aime Topete; Jocelyn Urías; María Celeste Vela

== See also ==
- Volleyball at the 2024 Summer Olympics
