= 2026 Men's Pan-American Volleyball Cup =

Volleyball tournament

Tournament details
- Host country: Mexico
- Dates: 9–16 August
- Teams: 10
- Venue: 1 (in 1 host city)

Final positions
- Champions: United States (6th title)
- Runners-up: Puerto Rico
- Third place: Canada
- Fourth place: Mexico

Tournament awards
- MVP: (United States) Patrick Rogers

The 2026 Men's Pan-American Volleyball Cup was the 19th edition of the annual men's volleyball tournament. It was held at the Poliforum 2 de la Universidad Autónoma del Estado de Morelos in Cuernavaca, Mexico from 9 to 16 August 2026.

The United States won their sixth title, after defeating Puerto Rico by 3–1 in the final. Canada defeated hosts Mexico to claim its second consecutive bronze medal. Patrick Rogers of the United States won the most valuable player.

== Pool composition ==
Pool A	Pool B
Canada; Costa Rica; Puerto Rico; Trinidad and Tobago; United States	Cuba; Curaçao; Dominican Republic; Guatemala; Mexico

== Preliminary round ==
All match times are local times, Central Zone (UTC−6).

=== Group A ===
Pos	Team	Pld	W	L	Pts	SW	SL	SR	SPW	SPL	SPR	Qualification
1	Canada	4	4	0	18	12	2	6.000	351	276	1.272	Semifinals
2	United States	4	3	1	15	9	3	3.000	296	244	1.213	Quarterfinals
3	Puerto Rico	4	2	2	11	7	6	1.167	289	290	0.997	Quarterfinals
4	Costa Rica	4	1	3	6	4	9	0.444	273	303	0.901	7th–10th semi-finals
5	Trinidad and Tobago	4	0	4	0	0	12	0.000	204	300	0.680	7th–10th semi-finals

Source: NORCECA

Date	Time		Score		Set 1	Set 2	Set 3	Set 4	Set 5	Total	Report
9 Aug	14:00	Canada	3–0	Trinidad and Tobago	25–20	25–13	25–19			75–52	P2 P3
9 Aug	16:00	United States	3–0	Costa Rica	25–15	26–24	25–14			76–53	P2 P3
10 Aug	14:00	Trinidad and Tobago	0–3	Costa Rica	21–25	19–25	15–25			55–75	P2 P3
10 Aug	16:00	Canada	3–1	Puerto Rico	20–25	25–21	25–19	25–11		95–76	P2 P3
11 Aug	14:00	Costa Rica	1–3	Canada	18–25	15–25	25–22	21–25		79–97	P2 P3
11 Aug	16:00	United States	3–0	Puerto Rico	25–21	26–24	25–18			76–63	P2 P3
12 Aug	14:00	United States	3–0	Trinidad and Tobago	25–13	25–17	25–14			75–44	P2 P3
12 Aug	16:00	Puerto Rico	3–0	Costa Rica	25–22	25–21	25–23			75–66	P2 P3
13 Aug	14:00	Puerto Rico	3–0	Trinidad and Tobago	25–14	25–21	25–18			75–53	P2 P3
13 Aug	18:00	United States	0–3	Canada	19–25	18–25	32–34			69–84	P2 P3

=== Group B ===
Pos	Team	Pld	W	L	Pts	SW	SL	SR	SPW	SPL	SPR	Qualification
1	Mexico (H)	4	3	1	15	10	4	2.500	343	293	1.171	Semifinals
2	Cuba	4	3	1	14	11	6	1.833	398	361	1.102	Quarterfinals
3	Dominican Republic	4	2	2	11	9	8	1.125	374	385	0.971	Quarterfinals
4	Guatemala	4	2	2	9	8	9	0.889	381	388	0.982	7th–10th semi-finals
5	Curaçao	4	0	4	1	1	12	0.083	258	327	0.789	7th–10th semi-finals

Source: NORCECA
(H) Host

Date	Time		Score		Set 1	Set 2	Set 3	Set 4	Set 5	Total	Report
9 Aug	18:00	Cuba	2–3	Dominican Republic	20–25	26–24	25–15	23–25	9–15	103–104	P2 P3
9 Aug	20:00	Mexico	3–0	Curaçao	25–22	25–17	25–14			75–53	P2 P3
10 Aug	18:00	Cuba	3–0	Curaçao	25–18	25–16	25–19			75–53	P2 P3
10 Aug	20:00	Mexico	3–0	Guatemala	25–15	25–21	25–22			75–58	P2 P3
11 Aug	18:00	Guatemala	3–1	Curaçao	23–25	25–23	25–19	25–17		98–84	P2 P3
11 Aug	20:00	Mexico	3–1	Dominican Republic	24–26	25–14	25–17	25–22		99–79	P2 P3
12 Aug	18:00	Dominican Republic	3–0	Curaçao	25–18	25–23	29–27			79–68	P2 P3
12 Aug	20:00	Cuba	3–2	Guatemala	25–23	20–25	28–30	25–15	19–17	117–110	P2 P3
13 Aug	16:00	Dominican Republic	2–3	Guatemala	26–24	21–25	25–21	28–30	12–15	112–115	P2 P3
13 Aug	20:00	Mexico	1–3	Cuba	18–25	28–30	25–23	23–25		94–103	P2 P3

== Final round ==
All match times are local times, Central Zone (UTC−6).

=== 7th–10th places ===
7th–10th semifinals
14 August
4A	Costa Rica	3
5B	Curaçao	1
14 August
4B	Guatemala	3
5A	Trinidad and Tobago	0

7th place match
15 August
4A	Costa Rica	1
4B	Guatemala	3
9th place match
15 August
5B	Curaçao	3
5A	Trinidad and Tobago	2

==== 7th–10th semi-finals ====
Date	Time		Score		Set 1	Set 2	Set 3	Set 4	Set 5	Total	Report
14 Aug	14:00	Costa Rica	3–1	Curaçao	23–25	25–13	25–13	25–17		98–68	P2 P3
14 Aug	16:00	Guatemala	3–0	Trinidad and Tobago	25–21	25–21	27–25			77–67	P2 P3

==== 9th place match ====
Date	Time		Score		Set 1	Set 2	Set 3	Set 4	Set 5	Total	Report
15 Aug	14:00	Curaçao	3–2	Trinidad and Tobago	25–20	20–25	25–19	19–25	15–12	104–101	P2 P3

==== 7th place match ====
Date	Time		Score		Set 1	Set 2	Set 3	Set 4	Set 5	Total	Report
15 Aug	16:00	Costa Rica	1–3	Guatemala	24–26	25–23	20–25	22–25		91–99	P2 P3

=== 1st–6th places ===
Quarterfinals
14 August
2B	Cuba	1
3A	Puerto Rico	3
14 August
2A	United States	3
3B	Dominican Republic	1

Semifinals
15 August
1A	Canada	1
3A	Puerto Rico	3
15 August
1B	Mexico	0
2A	United States	3
5th place match
16 August
3B	Dominican Republic	3
2B	Cuba	2

Final
16 August
3A	Puerto Rico	1
2A	United States	3
3rd place match
16 August
1A	Canada	3
1B	Mexico	1

==== Quarterfinals ====
Date	Time		Score		Set 1	Set 2	Set 3	Set 4	Set 5	Total	Report
14 Aug	18:00	United States	3–1	Dominican Republic	23–25	25–20	25–16	25–13		98–74	P2 P3
14 Aug	20:00	Cuba	1–3	Puerto Rico	25–18	26–28	26–28	19–25		96–99	P2 P3

==== Semifinals ====
Date	Time		Score		Set 1	Set 2	Set 3	Set 4	Set 5	Total	Report
15 Aug	18:00	Canada	1–3	Puerto Rico	18–25	23–25	25–17	20–25		86–92	P2 P3
15 Aug	20:00	Mexico	0–3	United States	16–25	20–25	16–25			52–75	P2 P3

==== 5th place match ====
Date	Time		Score		Set 1	Set 2	Set 3	Set 4	Set 5	Total	Report
16 Aug	13:30	Dominican Republic	3–2	Cuba	23–25	25–22	25–21	26–28	18–16	117–112	P2 P3

==== 3rd place match ====
Date	Time		Score		Set 1	Set 2	Set 3	Set 4	Set 5	Total	Report
16 Aug	15:30	Canada	3–1	Mexico	28–26	25–18	20–25	25–23		98–92	P2 P3

==== Final ====
Date	Time		Score		Set 1	Set 2	Set 3	Set 4	Set 5	Total	Report
16 Aug	17:30	Puerto Rico	1–3	United States	25–22	16–25	23–25	19–25		83–97	P2 P3

== Final standing ==
Rank	Team
1st place, gold medalist(s)	United States
2nd place, silver medalist(s)	Puerto Rico
3rd place, bronze medalist(s)	Canada
4	Mexico
5	Dominican Republic
6	Cuba
7	Guatemala
8	Costa Rica
9	Curaçao
10	Trinidad and Tobago

2026 Men's Pan-American Cup champions

United States
6th title

== Individual awards ==
- Most valuable player
  Patrick Rogers (USA)
- Best setter
  Michael Wright (USA)
- Best spikers
  Franky Hernández (MEX)
  Patrick Rogers (USA)
- Best blockers
  Parker Tomkinson (USA)
  Jeremy Venega (CRC)
- Best opposite
  Daniel Martínez (CUB)
- Best scorer
  Daniel Martínez (CUB)
- Best server
  Franky Hernández (MEX)
- Best libero
  Darian Picklyk (CAN)
- Best digger
  Darian Picklyk (CAN)
- Best receiver
  Pedro Molina (PUR)

== See also ==
- 2026 Women's Pan-American Volleyball Cup
