= 2026 Men's NORCECA Final Six =

Tournament details
- Host country: Puerto Rico
- Dates: 21–30 August 2026
- Teams: 6
- Venue: (in Ponce host cities)

Final positions
- Champions: United States (4th title)
- Runners-up: Canada
- Third place: Mexico

Tournament awards
- MVP: Tread Rosenthal (USA)

The 2026 Men's NORCECA Final Six was the sixth edition of the annual men's volleyball tournament. Six teams participated in this edition held in Ponce.

The United States won their fourth consecutive and overall titles, after defeated Canada 3–0 in the final. Tread Rosenthal of the United States won the Most Valuable Player award.

== Round robin ==
Pos	Team	Pld	W	L	Pts	SW	SL	SR	SPW	SPL	SPR	Qualification
1	United States	5	5	0	19	15	6	2.500	489	433	1.129	Semifinals
2	Canada	5	3	2	19	13	6	2.167	430	380	1.132	Semifinals
3	Mexico	5	3	2	14	10	8	1.250	417	427	0.977	Semifinals
4	Puerto Rico	5	3	2	12	11	11	1.000	485	482	1.006	Semifinals
5	Dominican Republic	5	1	4	8	6	12	0.500	399	418	0.955	
6	Guatemala	5	0	5	3	3	15	0.200	351	431	0.814	

Date	Time		Score		Set 1	Set 2	Set 3	Set 4	Set 5	Total	Report
23 August	16:00	United States	3–1	Mexico	32–30	25–19	22–25	25–20		104–94	
23 August	18:00	Guatemala	0–3	Canada	14–25	23–25	21–25			58–75	
23 August	20:00	Puerto Rico	3–1	Dominican Republic	25–22	23–25	25–23	25–22		98–92	
24 August	16:00	United States	3–0	Guatemala	25–19	25–13	25–16			75–48	
24 August	18:00	Mexico	3–0	Dominican Republic	25–22	25–17	32–30			82–69	
24 August	20:00	Puerto Rico	3–2	Canada	25–22	23–25	25–23	18–25	15–9	106–104	
25 August	16:00	Guatemala	0–3	Dominican Republic	20–25	17–25	17–25			54–75	
25 August	18:00	United States	3–2	Canada	17–25	22–25	25–21	25–19	15–11	104–101	
25 August	20:00	Puerto Rico	1–3	Mexico	25–17	17–25	21–25	22–25		85–92	
26 August	16:00	United States	3–2	Dominican Republic	21–25	25–21	25–16	23–25	15–11	109–98	
26 August	18:00	Canada	3–0	Mexico	25–13	25–17	25–17			75–47	
26 August	20:00	Puerto Rico	3–2	Guatemala	20–25	25–22	25–18	19–25	15–7	104–97	
27 August	16:00	Canada	3–0	Dominican Republic	25–23	25–20	25–22			75–65	
27 August	18:00	Guatemala	1–3	Mexico	29–27	22–25	23–25	20–25		94–102	
27 August	20:00	Puerto Rico	1–3	United States	23–25	25–22	23–25	21–25		92–97	

== Bracket ==
Semifinals
Canada	3
Mexico	0
United States	3
Puerto Rico	0

Final
Canada	0
United States	3
Third place
Mexico	3
Puerto Rico	2

== Semifinals ==
Date	Time		Score		Set 1	Set 2	Set 3	Set 4	Set 5	Total	Report
28 August	18:00	Canada	3–0	Mexico	25–22	25–19	25–22			75–63	
28 August	20:00	United States	3–0	Puerto Rico	25–21	25–23	25–23			75–67	

== Fifth place match ==
Date	Time		Score		Set 1	Set 2	Set 3	Set 4	Set 5	Total	Report
29 August	16:00	Dominican Republic	3–0	Guatemala	25–23	25–20	25–18			75–61	

== Third place match ==
Date	Time		Score		Set 1	Set 2	Set 3	Set 4	Set 5	Total	Report
29 August	18:00	Mexico	3–2	Puerto Rico	25–21	25–18	21–25	24–26	15–12	110–102	

== Final ==
Date	Time		Score		Set 1	Set 2	Set 3	Set 4	Set 5	Total	Report
29 August	20:00	Canada	0–3	United States	15–25	18–25	21–25			54–75	

== Final standing ==
Rank	Team
1st place, gold medalist(s)	United States
2nd place, silver medalist(s)	Canada
3rd place, bronze medalist(s)	Mexico
4	Puerto Rico
5	Dominican Republic
6	Guatemala

== Individual awards ==
- Most valuable player
  - Tread Rosenthal (USA)
- Best scorer
  - Klistan Lawrence (PUR)
- Best setter
  - Adolfo Rivas (GUA)
- Best Opposite
  - Andy Leonardo Blanco (GUA)
- Best spikers
  - Sean Kelly (USA)
  - Pelegrin Vargas (PUR)
- Best blockers
  - Paker Tomkinson (USA)
  - Moises Ortiz (DOM)
- Best libero
  - Darian Picklyk (CAN)
- Best server
  - Hector Cruz (DOM)
- Best receiver
  - Troy Gooch (USA)
- Best digger
  - Josue Gonzalez (GUA)
