= Ángel Matías =

Puerto Rican volleyball player (born 1976)

Personal information
- Born: July 30, 1976 (age 49)
Medal record
Men's volleyball
Representing Puerto Rico
Pan-American Cup
Silver medal – second place	2007 Santo Domingo	Team

Ángel Matías (born July 30, 1976) is a volleyball player from Puerto Rico, who was a member of the Men's National Team that ended up in second place at the 2007 Pan-American Cup in Santo Domingo, Dominican Republic. There he was named Best Defender of the tournament.

== Individual awards ==
- 2007 Pan-American Cup "Best Defender"
