= 2007 Men's Pan-American Volleyball Cup =

The 2007 Men's Pan-American Volleyball Cup was the second edition of the annual men's volleyball tournament, played by seven teams from North American countries from June 1 to June 9, 2007 in Santo Domingo, Dominican Republic. The event served as a qualifier for the 2008 America's Cup in Brazil. The winner of each pool automatically advanced to the semi-finals and the teams placed in second and third met in crossed matches in the quarterfinals round. Mexico win the event.

== Competing nations ==
Group A	Group B
Canada; Mexico; Puerto Rico	Cuba; Dominican Republic; Panama; Trinidad and Tobago

== Preliminary round ==
=== Group A ===
	Team	Points	G	W	L	PW	PL	Ratio	SW	SL	Ratio
1.	Puerto Rico	4	2	2	0	196	178	1.101	6	2	3.000
2.	Mexico	3	2	1	1	199	210	0.947	4	5	0.800
3.	Canada	2	2	0	2	194	201	0.965	3	6	0.500

- Sunday June 3

Canada	1 – 3	Puerto Rico	17–25 25–17 17–25 26–28

- Monday June 4

Mexico	3 – 2	Canada	19–25 25–23 21–25 25–22 16–14

- Tuesday June 5

Puerto Rico	3 – 1	Mexico	25–23 25–27 26–24 25–19

=== Group B ===
	Team	Points	G	W	L	PW	PL	Ratio	SW	SL	Ratio
1.	Cuba	6	3	3	0	253	205	1.234	9	1	9.000
2.	Dominican R.	5	3	2	1	252	220	1.145	6	4	1.500
3.	Panama	4	3	1	2	215	242	0.888	4	6	0.666
4.	Trinidad & T.	3	3	0	3	215	268	0.802	1	9	0.111

- Sunday June 3

Cuba	3 – 0	Panama	25–14 25–21 25–18
Trinidad & T.	0 – 3	Dominican R.	25–27 13–25 23–25

- Monday June 4

Trinidad & T.	1 – 3	Cuba	25–23 15–25 19–25 28–30
Dominican R.	3 – 1	Panama	25–27 25–20 25–22 25–15

- Tuesday June 5

Panama	3 – 0	Trinidad & T.	27–25 25–18 26–24
Cuba	3 – 0	Dominican R.	25–23 25–22 25–20

== Final round ==
Semi-finals
2007-06-07 – Santo Domingo
Cuba	1
Mexico	3
2007-06-07 – Santo Domingo
Puerto Rico	3
Canada	1

Final
2007-06-08 – Santo Domingo
Mexico	3
Puerto Rico	1
3rd place
2007-06-08 – Santo Domingo
Cuba	3
Canada	1

=== Quarterfinals ===
- Wednesday June 6, 2007

Mexico	3 – 0	Panama	25–14 26–24 25–16
Dominican R.	0 – 3	Canada	23–25 15–25 23–25

=== Classification ===
- Thursday June 7, 2007 — Fifth Place Match

Panama	0 – 3	Dominican R.	16–25 22–25 23–25

- Thursday June 7, 2007 — Sixth Place Match

Trinidad & T.	3 – 0	Panama	25–20 26–24 25–17

=== Semi-finals ===
- Thursday June 7, 2007

Cuba	1 – 3	Mexico	21–25 25–20 21–25 22–25
Puerto Rico	3 – 1	Canada	22–25 25–19 27–25 25–20

=== Finals ===
- Friday June 8, 2007 — Bronze Medal Match

Cuba	3 – 1	Canada	25–21 25–27 25–21 25–19

- Friday June 8, 2007 — Gold Medal Match

Mexico	3 – 1	Puerto Rico	26–24 25–22 21–25 25–20

== Final ranking ==
Place	Team
1.	Mexico
2.	Puerto Rico
3.	Cuba
4.	Canada
5.	Dominican Republic
6.	Trinidad and Tobago
7.	Panama

2007 Men's Pan-American Cup winners

Mexico
First title

  - Mexico, Puerto Rico and Cuba qualified for the 2008 America's Cup

== Awards ==
- Most valuable player
  - (Mexico) José Martell
- Best spiker
  - (Cuba) Yadier Sánchez
- Best scorer
  - (Cuba) Yadier Sánchez
- Best defender
  - (Puerto Rico) Ángel Matías
- Best setter
  - (Puerto Rico) Fernando Morales
- Best server
  - (Canada) Mark Dodds
- Best libero
  - (Dominican Republic) Amaury Martínez
- Best blocker
  - (Cuba) Raidel González
