= Elvis Contreras =

Dominican Republic volleyball player

Personal information
- Full name: Elvis Dalsires Contreras de los Santos
- Nationality: Dominican
- Born: 20 July 1979 (age 47); Tamayo
- Hometown: Santo Domingo
- Height: 1.90 m (6 ft 3 in)
- Weight: 77 kg (170 lb)
- Spike: 365 cm (144 in)
- Block: 355 cm (140 in)

Volleyball information
- Position: Wing spiker
- Current club: Al Arabi Kuwait

National team
1998-2014	Dominican Republic
Honours
Men's volleyball
Representing the Dominican Republic
Pan American Cup
Silver medal – second place	2006 Mexicali	Team
Bronze medal – third place	2008 Winnipeg	Team
Bronze medal – third place	2009 Chiapas	Team
Bronze medal – third place	2012 Santo Domingo	Team
Central American and Caribbean Games
Gold medal – first place	2014 Veracruz	Team
- Last updated: 26 October 2023

Elvis Dalsires Contreras de los Santos (born 20 July 1979, in Tamayo), also known as Elvis Contreras, is a male volleyball player from the Dominican Republic, who won the silver medal with the Dominican Republic men's national volleyball team at the 2006 Pan-American Cup in Mexicali, Mexico.

== Career ==
Contreras won the Best Spiker award at the 2001 NORCECA Championship, and Best Scorer at the 2005 version.

At the 2007 NORCECA Championship, Contreras was awarded Best Receiver, and his national team finished in 5th place.

Contreras won the Dominican Republic "2007 Volleyball Player of the Year".

In mid-June 2012, the Poland club Zaksa Kędzierzyn-Koźle announced his joining for the 2012–13 season.

Contreras won the bronze medal in the 2012 Men's Pan-American Volleyball Cup playing with his national team, and also won the Best Receiver and Best Server awards.

Contreras led the Technocrats to the title of the 2013 Caribbean Volleyball League, also winning the Most Valuable Player, Best Scorer, Best Spiker, and Best Server awards in the Trinidad and Tobago-based tournament. He then joined the Brazilian club Funvic Taubaté.

In August 2014, Contreras announced that he would retire from the national team after the 2014 Central American and Caribbean Games. At these games, the Dominican Republic won the gold medal for the first time, and Contreras was awarded the Most Valuable Player, Best Outside Spiker, and Best Scorer.

== Clubs ==
- (Dominican Republic) Bameso (1997–2000)
- (Dominican Republic) Los Prados (2000–2003)
- (Spain) 7 Islas Compaktuna (2002–2003)
- (Italy) Armet Bassano del Grappa (2003–2004)
- (Germany) VfB Friedrichshafen (2004–2006)
- (Puerto Rico) Leones de Ponce (2006)
- (Brazil) Sada Betim (2006–2007)
- (Italy) Tonno Callipo Vibo Valentia (2007–2010)
- (Dominican Republic) Bahoruco (2010)
- (Dominican Republic) San José de Las Matas (2010)
- (Russia) Dinamo Krasnodar (2011–2012)
- (Poland) Zaksa Kędzierzyn-Koźle (2012)
- (Russia) Iskra Odintsovo (2013)
- (Trinidad and Tobago) Technocrats (2013)
- (Dominican Republic) La Romana (2013)
- (Brazil) Funvic/Taubaté (2013–2014)
- (Bahrain) Alhi Club (2014–2015)
- (Kuwait) Kazma sporting club (2019–2023)

=== Individuals ===
- 2001 NORCECA Championship "Best spiker"
- 2005 NORCECA Championship "Best scorer"
- 2006 Pan-American Cup "Most valuable player"
- 2006 Pan-American Cup "Best scorer"
- 2006 Dominican Republic Volleyball "Player of the Year"
- 2007 NORCECA Championship "Best receiver"
- 2008 Pan-American Cup "Best scorer"
- 2012 Pan-American Cup "Best server"
- 2012 Pan-American Cup "Best receiver"
- 2013 Caribbean League "Most valuable player"
- 2014 Arabian Champion "Most valuable player"
- 2014 Dominican Republic Volleyball "Player of the Year"
- 2014 Central American and Caribbean Games "Most valuable player"
- 2014 Central American and Caribbean Games "Best outside spiker"
- 2014 Central American and Caribbean Games "Best scorer"

=== Clubs ===
- 2005 German Cup - Champion, with VfB Friedrichshafen
- 2005 German Championship - Champion, with VfB Friedrichshafen
- 2006 German Championship - Champion, with VfB Friedrichshafen
- 2006 German Cup - Champion, with VfB Friedrichshafen
- 2008 Italian A2 Championship - Champion, with Tonno Callipo Vibo Valentia
- 2010 Dominican Republic Volleyball League - Runner-Up, with Bahoruco
- 2013 Caribbean League - Champion, with Technocrats
- 2014 Arabian Champion Cup - Champion, with Alhi Club Bahrain
- 2015 Bahrain Championship - Champion, with Alhi Club Bahrain
