= Yadier Sánchez =

Cuban volleyball player (born 1987)

Personal information
- Full name: Yadier Sánchez Sierra
- Born: January 8, 1987 (age 39)
Medal record
Men's volleyball
Representing Cuba
America's Cup
Bronze medal – third place	2007 Manaus	Team competition
NORCECA Championship
Bronze medal – third place	2007 Anaheim	Team competition

Yadier Sánchez Sierra (born January 8, 1987) is a volleyball player from Cuba, who plays in different positions. He twice won a bronze medal with the Men's National Team in 2007.

== Individual awards ==
- 2007 Pan-American Cup "Best Spiker"
- 2007 Pan-American Cup "Best Scorer"
