= 2019 Men's Pan-American Volleyball Cup =

Tournament details
- Host country: Mexico
- City: Colima City
- Dates: 16–21 June
- Teams: 12
- Venue: 1 (in 1 host city)

Final positions
- Champions: Cuba (3rd title)
- Runners-up: Argentina
- Third place: Mexico
- Fourth place: Chile

Tournament awards
- MVP: (Cuba) Miguel Ángel López

The 2019 Men's Pan-American Volleyball Cup was the 14th edition of the annual men's volleyball tournament. It was held in Colima City, Colima, Mexico from 16 to 21 June. Twelve teams will compete in the tournament.

Cuba won the title after defeating the two-time defending champions Argentina in the final by 3–2. Miguel Ángel López was awarded the Most Valuable Player.

== Pools composition ==
| Pool A | Pool B | Pool C |
|---|---|---|
| Argentina | Mexico | Chile |
| Canada | Peru | Dominican Republic |
| Cuba | Puerto Rico | Guatemala |
| Suriname | Trinidad and Tobago | United States |

== Venue ==
- Auditorio Multifuncional de Colima, Colima City, Mexico

== Pool standing procedure ==
1. Number of matches won
2. Match points
3. Points ratio
4. Sets ratio
5. Result of the last match between the tied teams

Match won 3–0: 5 match points for the winner, 0 match points for the loser
Match won 3–1: 4 match points for the winner, 1 match point for the loser
Match won 3–2: 3 match points for the winner, 2 match points for the loser

== Preliminary round ==
- All times are Central Daylight Time (UTC−05:00).

=== Pool A ===
| Pos | Team | Pld | W | L | Pts | SPW | SPL | SPR | SW | SL | SR | Qualification |
|---|---|---|---|---|---|---|---|---|---|---|---|---|
| 1 | Cuba | 3 | 3 | 0 | 13 | 261 | 207 | 1.261 | 9 | 2 | 4.500 | Semifinals |
| 2 | Argentina | 3 | 2 | 1 | 12 | 263 | 212 | 1.241 | 8 | 3 | 2.667 | Quarterfinals |
| 3 | Canada | 3 | 1 | 2 | 5 | 193 | 199 | 0.970 | 3 | 6 | 0.500 | 7th–10th classification |
| 4 | Suriname | 3 | 0 | 3 | 0 | 126 | 225 | 0.560 | 0 | 9 | 0.000 | |

| Date | Time | | Score | | Set 1 | Set 2 | Set 3 | Set 4 | Set 5 | Total | Report |
|---|---|---|---|---|---|---|---|---|---|---|---|
| 16 Jun | 13:00 | Canada | 3–0 | Suriname | 25–14 | 25–19 | 25–16 | | | 75–49 | P2 P3 |
| 16 Jun | 18:00 | Argentina | 2–3 | Cuba | 30–32 | 20–25 | 25–22 | 25–17 | 13–15 | 113–111 | P2 P3 |
| 17 Jun | 13:00 | Suriname | 0–3 | Argentina | 10–25 | 19–25 | 12–25 | | | 41–75 | P2 P3 |
| 17 Jun | 18:00 | Cuba | 3–0 | Canada | 25–19 | 25–20 | 25–19 | | | 75–58 | P2 P3 |
| 18 Jun | 9:00 | Suriname | 0–3 | Cuba | 11–25 | 15–25 | 10–25 | | | 36–75 | P2 P3 |
| 18 Jun | 18:00 | Canada | 0–3 | Argentina | 17–25 | 22–25 | 21–25 | | | 60–75 | P2 P3 |

=== Pool B ===
| Pos | Team | Pld | W | L | Pts | SPW | SPL | SPR | SW | SL | SR | Qualification |
|---|---|---|---|---|---|---|---|---|---|---|---|---|
| 1 | Mexico | 3 | 3 | 0 | 14 | 249 | 213 | 1.169 | 9 | 1 | 9.000 | Semifinals |
| 2 | Puerto Rico | 3 | 2 | 1 | 7 | 280 | 259 | 1.081 | 6 | 6 | 1.000 | Quarterfinals |
| 3 | Peru | 3 | 1 | 2 | 8 | 275 | 275 | 1.000 | 6 | 6 | 1.000 | 7th–10th classification |
| 4 | Trinidad and Tobago | 3 | 0 | 3 | 1 | 191 | 248 | 0.770 | 1 | 9 | 0.111 | |

| Date | Time | | Score | | Set 1 | Set 2 | Set 3 | Set 4 | Set 5 | Total | Report |
|---|---|---|---|---|---|---|---|---|---|---|---|
| 16 Jun | 9:00 | Peru | 2–3 | Puerto Rico | 25–23 | 26–24 | 28–30 | 19–25 | 14–16 | 112–118 | P2 P3 |
| 16 Jun | 20:00 | Mexico | 3–0 | Trinidad and Tobago | 25–19 | 25–20 | 25–22 | | | 75–61 | P2 P3 |
| 17 Jun | 9:00 | Trinidad and Tobago | 1–3 | Puerto Rico | 25–23 | 14–25 | 18–25 | 15–25 | | 72–98 | P2 P3 |
| 17 Jun | 20:00 | Mexico | 3–1 | Peru | 25–15 | 28–26 | 21–25 | 25–22 | | 99–88 | P2 P3 |
| 18 Jun | 13:00 | Peru | 3–0 | Trinidad and Tobago | 25–22 | 25–14 | 25–22 | | | 75–58 | P2 P3 |
| 18 Jun | 20:00 | Mexico | 3–0 | Puerto Rico | 25–23 | 25–23 | 25–18 | | | 75–64 | P2 P3 |

=== Pool C ===
| Pos | Team | Pld | W | L | Pts | SPW | SPL | SPR | SW | SL | SR | Qualification |
|---|---|---|---|---|---|---|---|---|---|---|---|---|
| 1 | Chile | 3 | 3 | 0 | 13 | 264 | 214 | 1.234 | 9 | 2 | 4.500 | Quarterfinals |
| 2 | United States | 3 | 2 | 1 | 11 | 238 | 197 | 1.208 | 7 | 3 | 2.333 | Quarterfinals |
| 3 | Dominican Republic | 3 | 1 | 2 | 4 | 263 | 286 | 0.920 | 4 | 8 | 0.500 | 7th–10th classification |
| 4 | Guatemala | 3 | 0 | 3 | 2 | 202 | 270 | 0.748 | 2 | 9 | 0.222 | 7th–10th classification |

| Date | Time | | Score | | Set 1 | Set 2 | Set 3 | Set 4 | Set 5 | Total | Report |
|---|---|---|---|---|---|---|---|---|---|---|---|
| 16 Jun | 11:00 | Guatemala | 0–3 | United States | 10–25 | 17–25 | 17–25 | | | 44–75 | P2 P3 |
| 16 Jun | 16:00 | Chile | 3–1 | Dominican Republic | 25–18 | 20–25 | 25–20 | 25–21 | | 95–84 | P2 P3 |
| 17 Jun | 11:00 | Dominican Republic | 3–2 | Guatemala | 36–38 | 25–21 | 25–19 | 19–25 | 15–13 | 120–116 | P2 P3 |
| 17 Jun | 16:00 | United States | 1–3 | Chile | 22–25 | 25–19 | 22–25 | 19–25 | | 88–94 | P2 P3 |
| 18 Jun | 11:00 | Guatemala | 0–3 | Chile | 14–25 | 17–25 | 11–25 | | | 42–75 | P2 P3 |
| 18 Jun | 16:00 | Dominican Republic | 0–3 | United States | 20–25 | 19–25 | 20–25 | | | 59–75 | P2 P3 |

== Final round ==
=== Championship bracket ===
Quarterfinals
C1 | Chile | 3
B2 | Puerto Rico | 0
A2 | Argentina | 3
C2 | United States | 0

Semifinals
A1 | Cuba | 3
C1 | Chile | 0
B1 | Mexico | 1
A2 | Argentina | 3
5th place
B2 | Puerto Rico | 0
C2 | United States | 3

Final
A1 | Cuba | 3
A2 | Argentina | 2
3rd place
C1 | Chile | 0
B1 | Mexico | 3

=== 7th–10th places bracket ===
Classification 7–10
B3 | Peru | 3
C4 | Guatemala | 0
C3 | Dominican Republic | 0
A3 | Canada | 3

7th place
B3 | Peru | 2
A3 | Canada | 3
9th place
C4 | Guatemala | 0
C3 | Dominican Republic | 3

==== 11th place match ====
| Date | Time | | Score | | Set 1 | Set 2 | Set 3 | Set 4 | Set 5 | Total | Report |
|---|---|---|---|---|---|---|---|---|---|---|---|
| 19 Jun | 11:00 | Trinidad and Tobago | 3–0 | Suriname | 25–12 | 25–21 | 25–16 | | | 75–49 | P2 P3 |

==== Classification 7th–10th ====
| Date | Time | | Score | | Set 1 | Set 2 | Set 3 | Set 4 | Set 5 | Total | Report |
|---|---|---|---|---|---|---|---|---|---|---|---|
| 19 Jun | 13:00 | Peru | 3–0 | Guatemala | 25–22 | 25–22 | 25–21 | | | 75–65 | P2 P3 |
| 19 Jun | 16:00 | Dominican Republic | 0–3 | Canada | 14–25 | 22–25 | 14–25 | | | 50–75 | P2 P3 |

==== Quarterfinals ====
| Date | Time | | Score | | Set 1 | Set 2 | Set 3 | Set 4 | Set 5 | Total | Report |
|---|---|---|---|---|---|---|---|---|---|---|---|
| 19 Jun | 18:00 | Argentina | 3–0 | United States | 25–23 | 25–22 | 25–22 | | | 75–67 | P2 P3 |
| 19 Jun | 20:00 | Chile | 3–0 | Puerto Rico | 25–19 | 25–22 | 25–21 | | | 75–62 | P2 P3 |

==== 9th place match ====
| Date | Time | | Score | | Set 1 | Set 2 | Set 3 | Set 4 | Set 5 | Total | Report |
|---|---|---|---|---|---|---|---|---|---|---|---|
| 20 Jun | 13:00 | Guatemala | 0–3 | Dominican Republic | 20–25 | 25–27 | 19–25 | | | 64–77 | P2 P3 |

==== 7th place match ====
| Date | Time | | Score | | Set 1 | Set 2 | Set 3 | Set 4 | Set 5 | Total | Report |
|---|---|---|---|---|---|---|---|---|---|---|---|
| 20 Jun | 16:00 | Peru | 2–3 | Canada | 23–25 | 20–25 | 25–21 | 25–21 | 15–17 | 108–109 | P2 P3 |

==== Semifinals ====
| Date | Time | | Score | | Set 1 | Set 2 | Set 3 | Set 4 | Set 5 | Total | Report |
|---|---|---|---|---|---|---|---|---|---|---|---|
| 20 Jun | 18:00 | Cuba | 3–0 | Chile | 25–20 | 31–29 | 25–20 | | | 81–69 | P2 P3 |
| 20 Jun | 20:00 | Mexico | 1–3 | Argentina | 17–25 | 12–25 | 27–25 | 22–25 | | 78–100 | P2 P3 |

==== 5th place match ====
| Date | Time | | Score | | Set 1 | Set 2 | Set 3 | Set 4 | Set 5 | Total | Report |
|---|---|---|---|---|---|---|---|---|---|---|---|
| 21 Jun | 15:00 | United States | 3–0 | Puerto Rico | 25–17 | 25–23 | 25–18 | | | 75–58 | P2 P3 |

==== 3rd place match ====
| Date | Time | | Score | | Set 1 | Set 2 | Set 3 | Set 4 | Set 5 | Total | Report |
|---|---|---|---|---|---|---|---|---|---|---|---|
| 21 Jun | 17:00 | Chile | 0–3 | Mexico | 17–25 | 20–25 | 24–26 | | | 61–76 | P2 P3 |

==== Final ====
| Date | Time | | Score | | Set 1 | Set 2 | Set 3 | Set 4 | Set 5 | Total | Report |
|---|---|---|---|---|---|---|---|---|---|---|---|
| 21 Jun | 20:00 | Cuba | 3–2 | Argentina | 19–25 | 25–21 | 25–20 | 21–25 | 15–9 | 105–100 | P2 P3 |

== Final standing ==
| Rank | Team |
|---|---|
| 1st place, gold medalist(s) | Cuba |
| 2nd place, silver medalist(s) | Argentina |
| 3rd place, bronze medalist(s) | Mexico |
| 4 | Chile |
| 5 | United States |
| 6 | Puerto Rico |
| 7 | Canada |
| 8 | Peru |
| 9 | Dominican Republic |
| 10 | Guatemala |
| 11 | Trinidad and Tobago |
| 12 | Suriname |

| Qualified for the 2019 Challenger Cup |

2019 Men's Pan-American Cup champions

Cuba
3rd title

12–man roster
Marlon Yang, Miguel Ángel López, Osniel Melgarejo, José Masso, Javier Concepción, Yonder García, Liván Osoria (c), Lyvan Taboada, Jesús Herrera, Adrián Goide, Yohan León, Roamy Alonso
Head coach
Nicolás Vives

== Individual awards ==
- Most valuable player
  (Cuba) Miguel Ángel López
- Best setter
  (Mexico) Pedro Rangel
- Best outside hitters
  (Peru) Álvaro Hidalgo
  (Argentina) Nicolás Bruno
- Best middle blockers
  (Peru) Daniel Urueña
  (Cuba) Roamy Alonso
- Best Opposite
  (Peru) Eduardo Romay
- Best scorer
  (Peru) Eduardo Romay
- Best server
  (Peru) Eduardo Romay
- Best libero
  (Puerto Rico) Arnel Cabrera
- Best digger
  (United States) Kyle Dagostino
- Best receiver
  (Mexico) Jorge Barajas
