= 2023 Men's Pan-American Volleyball Cup =

16th edition of the annual men's volleyball tournament

Tournament details
- Host country: (Mexico) México
- Dates: 15–20 August 2023
- Teams: 10
- Venue: 1 (in 1 host city)

Final positions
- Champions: Canada (1st title)
- Runners-up: Brazil
- Third place: Chile
- Fourth place: Mexico

Tournament awards
- MVP: (Canada) Isaac Heslinga

Tournament statistics
- Matches played: 23
- Attendance: 25,425 (1,105 per match)

The 2023 Men's Pan-American Volleyball Cup was the 16th edition of the annual men's volleyball tournament. It was held in Guadalajara, Jalisco, Mexico, from 15 August to 20 August 2023. Ten teams competing in the tournament.

Canada won their first gold medal after defeating Brazil by 3–1. Chile defeated the hosts Mexico to claim the bronze medal. Isaac Heslinga of Canada was the most valuable player.

== Competing nations ==
Group A	Group B	Group C
United States; Puerto Rico; Chile	Brazil; Dominican Republic; Canada	Cuba; Colombia; Mexico; Peru

== Competition format ==
The competition format for the Pan-American Volleyball Cup divides the ten participating teams in three groups, one with three teams and one of four teams. The two best group winners will advance to the semifinals while the third group winner and the second-place teams from each group will advance to the quarterfinals. The remaining teams will play in the 7th to 10th place classification matches.

=== Pool standing procedure ===
In case of two or more teams finishing equal on wins, the teams will be classified according to the following criteria:

1. Points
- Match won 3–0: 5 points for the winning team, 0 points for the losing team
- Match won 3–1: 4 points for the winning team, 1 point for the losing team
- Match won 3–2: 3 points for the winning team, 2 points for the losing team
2. Setpoint ratio
3. Set ratio
4. Result of head-to-head matchup(s)

== Preliminary round ==
- All times are Central Standard Time (UTC−06:00).

=== Group A ===
Pos	Team	Pld	W	L	Pts	SPW	SPL	SPR	SW	SL	SR	Qualification
1	United States	2	2	0	9	172	132	1.303	6	1	6.000	Quarterfinals
2	Chile	2	1	1	6	147	145	1.014	4	3	1.333	Quarterfinals
3	Puerto Rico	2	0	2	0	109	151	0.722	0	6	0.000	7th–10th classification

Source: NORCECA
Rules for classification: 1) points; 2) setpoint ratio; 3) set ratio; 4) head-to-head result.

Date	Time		Score		Set 1	Set 2	Set 3	Set 4	Set 5	Total	Report
15 Aug	14:00	United States	3–0	Puerto Rico	26–24	25–13	25–23			76–60	P2 P3
16 Aug	14:00	Chile	1–3	United States	14–25	25–21	12–25	21–25		72–96	P2 P3
17 Aug	14:00	Puerto Rico	0–3	Chile	14–25	16–25	19–25			49–75	P2 P3

=== Group B ===
Pos	Team	Pld	W	L	Pts	SPW	SPL	SPR	SW	SL	SR	Qualification
1	Brazil	2	2	0	10	150	108	1.389	6	0	MAX	Semifinals
2	Canada	2	1	1	4	149	151	0.987	3	4	0.750	Quarterfinals
3	Dominican Republic	2	0	2	1	127	167	0.760	1	6	0.167	7th–10th classification

Source: NORCECA
Rules for classification: 1) points; 2) setpoint ratio; 3) set ratio; 4) head-to-head result.

Date	Time		Score		Set 1	Set 2	Set 3	Set 4	Set 5	Total	Report
15 Aug	16:00	Brazil	3–0	Dominican Republic	25–17	25–17	25–17			75–51	P2 P3
16 Aug	16:00	Canada	0–3	Brazil	16–25	20–25	21–25			57–75	P2 P3
17 Aug	16:00	Dominican Republic	1–3	Canada	14–25	25–17	21–25	16–25		76–92	P2 P3

=== Group C ===
Pos	Team	Pld	W	L	Pts	SPW	SPL	SPR	SW	SL	SR	Qualification
1	Mexico (H)	3	3	0	12	289	247	1.170	9	3	3.000	Semifinals
2	Colombia	3	2	1	10	218	199	1.095	6	3	2.000	Quarterfinals
3	Peru	3	1	2	7	234	255	0.918	5	6	0.833	7th–10th classification
4	Cuba	3	0	3	1	207	247	0.838	1	9	0.111	7th–10th classification

Source: NORCECA
Rules for classification: 1) points; 2) setpoint ratio; 3) set ratio; 4) head-to-head result.
(H) Host

Date	Time		Score		Set 1	Set 2	Set 3	Set 4	Set 5	Total	Report
15 Aug	18:00	Cuba	0–3	Colombia	24–26	17–25	20–25			61–76	P2 P3
15 Aug	20:00	Mexico	3–2	Peru	23–25	25–10	25–19	30–32	15–10	118–96	P2 P3
16 Aug	18:00	Peru	3–0	Cuba	25–20	25–19	25–19			75–58	P2 P3
16 Aug	20:00	Colombia	0–3	Mexico	22–25	19–25	22–25			63–75	P2 P3
17 Aug	18:00	Colombia	3–0	Peru	25–23	29–27	25–13			79–63	P2 P3
17 Aug	20:00	Mexico	3–1	Cuba	21–25	25–23	25–19	25–21		96–88	P2 P3

=== Ranking of group winners ===
The two best group winners will advance to the semifinals while the third group winner will advance to the quarterfinals.

Pos	Team	Pld	W	L	Pts	SW	SL	SR	SPW	SPL	SPR	Qualification
1	Mexico (H)	3	3	0	12	9	3	3.000	289	247	1.170	Semifinals
2	Brazil	2	2	0	10	6	0	MAX	150	108	1.389	Semifinals
3	United States	2	2	0	9	6	1	6.000	172	132	1.303	Quarterfinals

Source: NORCECA
Rules for classification: 1) points; 2) setpoint ratio; 3) set ratio.
(H) Host

== Final round ==
- All times are Central Standard Time (UTC−06:00).

Quarterfinals
18 August – Guadalajara
Colombia	2
Chile	3
18 August – Guadalajara
United States	0
Canada	3

Semifinals
19 August – Guadalajara
Brazil	3
Chile	0
19 August – Guadalajara
Mexico	1
Canada	3

Final
20 August – Guadalajara
Brazil	1
Canada	3
3rd place match
20 August – Guadalajara
Chile	3
Mexico	0

5th place match
20 August – Guadalajara
Colombia	0
United States	3

7th–10th classification
18 August – Guadalajara
Peru	3
Puerto Rico	2
18 August – Guadalajara
Dominican Republic	0
Cuba	3

7th place match
19 August – Guadalajara
Peru	3
Cuba	2
9th place match
19 August – Guadalajara
Puerto Rico	3
Dominican Republic	1

=== 7th–10th classification ===
Date	Time		Score		Set 1	Set 2	Set 3	Set 4	Set 5	Total	Report
18 Aug	14:00	Peru	3–2	Puerto Rico	22–25	25–22	31–29	17–25	15–11	110–112	P2 P3
18 Aug	16:00	Dominican Republic	0–3	Cuba	24–26	23–25	22–25			69–76	P2 P3

==== 9th place match ====
Date	Time		Score		Set 1	Set 2	Set 3	Set 4	Set 5	Total	Report
19 Aug	14:00	Puerto Rico	3–1	Dominican Republic	28–26	25–20	20–25	25–19		98–90	P2 P3

==== 7th place match ====
Date	Time		Score		Set 1	Set 2	Set 3	Set 4	Set 5	Total	Report
19 Aug	16:00	Peru	3–2	Cuba	25–18	17–25	25–20	16–25	15–12	98–100	P2 P3

=== Quarterfinals ===
Date	Time		Score		Set 1	Set 2	Set 3	Set 4	Set 5	Total	Report
18 Aug	18:00	Colombia	2–3	Chile	23–25	25–15	25–17	25–27	16–18	114–102	P2 P3
18 Aug	20:00	United States	0–3	Canada	20–25	20–25	25–27			65–77	P2 P3

==== 5th place match ====
Date	Time		Score		Set 1	Set 2	Set 3	Set 4	Set 5	Total	Report
20 Aug	14:00	Colombia	0–3	United States	18–25	20–25	15–25			53–75	P2 P3

=== Semifinals ===
Date	Time		Score		Set 1	Set 2	Set 3	Set 4	Set 5	Total	Report
19 Aug	18:00	Brazil	3–0	Chile	25–23	25–20	25–21			75–64	P2 P3
19 Aug	20:00	Mexico	1–3	Canada	19–25	25–23	22–25	18–25		84–98	P2 P3

==== 3rd place match ====
Date	Time		Score		Set 1	Set 2	Set 3	Set 4	Set 5	Total	Report
20 Aug	16:00	Chile	3–0	Mexico	25–22	27–25	25–22			77–69	P2 P3

=== Final ===
Date	Time		Score		Set 1	Set 2	Set 3	Set 4	Set 5	Total	Report
20 Aug	18:00	Brazil	1–3	Canada	24–26	25–20	23–25	22–25		94–96	P2 P3

== Final standing ==
Rank	Team
1st place, gold medalist(s)	Canada
2nd place, silver medalist(s)	Brazil
3rd place, bronze medalist(s)	Chile
4	Mexico
5	United States
6	Colombia
7	Peru
8	Cuba
9	Puerto Rico
10	Dominican Republic

2023 Men's Pan-American Cup champions

Canada
1st title

14–man roster
Byron Keturakis, Logan House, Jonathan Portelance, Jordan Canham, Jackson Howe, Matthew Neaves, Jesse Elser, Isaac Heslinga, Fynn McCarthy, Liam Kristjanson, James Vincett, Evan Falardeau, Zachary Hollands and Darian Picklyk
Head coach
Daniel Lewis

== Awards ==
- Most valuable player
  Isaac Heslinga (CAN)
- Best setter
  Matheus Gonçalves (BRA)
- Best outside hitters
  Wilfrido Hernández (DOM)
  José Miguel Gutiérrez (CUB)
- Best middle blockers
  Daniel Urueña (PER)
  Axel Téllez (MEX)
- Best opposite
  Darlan Souza (BRA)
- Best scorer
  Vicente Parraguirre (CHI)
- Best server
  Darlan Souza (BRA)
- Best libero
  Hiram Bravo Moreno (MEX)
- Best digger
  Hiram Bravo Moreno (MEX)
- Best receiver
  Alain Gorguet (CUB)

== See also ==
- 2023 Women's Pan-American Volleyball Cup
