= José Mendoza Perdomo =

Mexican volleyball player (born 1993)

Personal information
- Full name: José Roberto Mendoza Perdomo
- Nationality: Mexican
- Born: 31 May 1993 (age 33)
- Height: 170 cm (5 ft 7 in)
- Weight: 71 kg (157 lb)
- Spike: 290 cm (114 in)
- Block: 265 cm (104 in)

Volleyball information
- Number: 6 (national team)

Career
Years	Teams
2014	Imss

National team
2014–	Mexico

José Roberto Mendoza Perdomo (born 31 May 1993) is a Mexican male volleyball player. He is part of the Mexico men's national volleyball team. On club level he plays for the Virtus Guanajuato.
