= 2015 Men's Pan-American Volleyball Cup =

Tournament details
- Host country: United States
- Dates: 12–17 August
- Teams: 8
- Venue: 1 (in 1 host city)

Final positions
- Champions: Brazil (3rd title)

Tournament awards
- MVP: (Brazil) Alan Souza

The 2015 Men's Pan-American Volleyball Cup was the tenth edition of the annual men's volleyball tournament. It was held in Reno, Nevada, United States from 12 to 17 August 2015 and played by eight countries.

== Pools composition ==
Pool A	Pool B
Brazil	Argentina
Canada	Mexico
Dominican Republic	United States
Puerto Rico	Venezuela

== Venue ==
- Reno Events Center, Reno, Nevada

== Pool standing procedure ==
1. Numbers of matches won
2. Match points
3. Points ratio
4. Sets ratio
5. Result of the last match between the tied teams

Match won 3–0: 5 match points for the winner, 0 match points for the loser
Match won 3–1: 4 match points for the winner, 1 match point for the loser
Match won 3–2: 3 match points for the winner, 2 match points for the loser

== Preliminary round ==
- All times are Pacific Daylight Time (UTC−07:00).

=== Pool A ===
Pos	Team	Pld	W	L	Pts	SW	SL	SR	SPW	SPL	SPR	Qualification
1	Brazil	3	3	0	15	9	0	MAX	225	179	1.257	Semifinals
2	Canada	3	2	1	8	6	5	1.200	243	241	1.008	Quarterfinals
3	Dominican Republic	3	1	2	7	5	6	0.833	243	247	0.984	Quarterfinals
4	Puerto Rico	3	0	3	0	0	9	0.000	181	225	0.804	5th–8th classifications

Date	Time		Score		Set 1	Set 2	Set 3	Set 4	Set 5	Total	Report
12 Aug	15:26	Brazil	3–0	Dominican Republic	25–19	25–21	25–22			75–62	P2 P3
12 Aug	17:27	Canada	3–0	Puerto Rico	25–20	25–21	25–19			75–60	P2 P3
13 Aug	13:00	Canada	3–2	Dominican Republic	25–18	25–21	27–29	17–25	15–13	109–106	P2 P3
13 Aug	17:50	Puerto Rico	0–3	Brazil	22–25	22–25	14–25			58–75	P2 P3
14 Aug	13:04	Dominican Republic	3–0	Puerto Rico	25–22	25–22	25–19			75–63	P2 P3
14 Aug	17:15	Brazil	3–0	Canada	25–17	25–19	25–23			75–59	P2 P3

=== Pool B ===
Pos	Team	Pld	W	L	Pts	SW	SL	SR	SPW	SPL	SPR	Qualification
1	Argentina	3	3	0	13	9	2	4.500	269	237	1.135	Semifinals
2	Venezuela	3	2	1	8	6	5	1.200	255	239	1.067	Quarterfinals
3	United States	3	1	2	7	5	6	0.833	261	269	0.970	Quarterfinals
4	Mexico	3	0	3	2	2	9	0.222	232	272	0.853	5th–8th classifications

Date	Time		Score		Set 1	Set 2	Set 3	Set 4	Set 5	Total	Report
12 Aug	13:06	Argentina	3–1	Mexico	25–22	25–18	20–25	25–15		95–80	P2 P3
12 Aug	19:29	United States	1–3	Venezuela	25–20	21–25	23–25	18–25		87–95	P2 P3
13 Aug	15:53	Venezuela	0–3	Argentina	23–25	21–25	21–25			65–75	P2 P3
13 Aug	19:45	United States	3–0	Mexico	30–28	25–22	27–25			82–75	P2 P3
14 Aug	15:04	Mexico	1–3	Venezuela	15–25	25–20	20–25	17–25		77–95	P2 P3
14 Aug	19:10	United States	1–3	Argentina	21–25	22–25	26–24	23–25		92–99	P2 P3

== Final round ==
- All times are Pacific Daylight Time (UTC−07:00).

=== Championship bracket ===
Quarterfinals
A2	Canada	3
B3	United States	2
B2	Venezuela	3
A3	Dominican Republic	0

Semifinals
B1	Argentina	3
A2	Canada	1
A1	Brazil	3
B2	Venezuela	0

Final
B1	Argentina	1
A1	Brazil	3
Third place
A2	Canada	2
B2	Venezuela	3

=== 5th–8th places bracket ===
Classification 5–8
B4	Mexico	3
A3	Dominican Republic	0
A4	Puerto Rico	2
B3	United States	3

Classification 5–6
B4	Mexico	3
B3	United States	0
Classification 7–8
A3	Dominican Republic	2
A4	Puerto Rico	3

==== Quarterfinals ====
Date	Time		Score		Set 1	Set 2	Set 3	Set 4	Set 5	Total	Report
15 Aug	17:00	Venezuela	3–0	Dominican Republic	25–23	25–17	25–20			75–60	P2 P3
15 Aug	19:00	Canada	3–2	United States	27–29	25–18	25–21	20–25	19–17	116–110	P2 P3

==== Classification 5th–8th ====
Date	Time		Score		Set 1	Set 2	Set 3	Set 4	Set 5	Total	Report
16 Aug	13:00	Mexico	3–0	Dominican Republic	25–16	25–19	25–23			75–58	P2 P3
16 Aug	15:00	Puerto Rico	2–3	United States	21–25	15–25	25–22	30–28	9–15	100–115	P2 P3

==== Semifinals ====
Date	Time		Score		Set 1	Set 2	Set 3	Set 4	Set 5	Total	Report
16 Aug	17:43	Argentina	3–1	Canada	25–19	25–22	23–25	25–21		98–87	P2 P3
16 Aug	20:11	Brazil	3–0	Venezuela	28–26	25–18	25–20			78–64	P2 P3

==== 7th place match ====
Date	Time		Score		Set 1	Set 2	Set 3	Set 4	Set 5	Total	Report
17 Aug	13:00	Dominican Republic	2–3	Puerto Rico	25–17	25–22	17–25	23–25	11–15	101–104	P2 P3

==== 5th place match ====
Date	Time		Score		Set 1	Set 2	Set 3	Set 4	Set 5	Total	Report
17 Aug	15:40	Mexico	3–0	United States	25–23	25–20	25–23			75–66	P2 P3

==== 3rd place match ====
Date	Time		Score		Set 1	Set 2	Set 3	Set 4	Set 5	Total	Report
17 Aug	17:29	Canada	2–3	Venezuela	22–25	25–18	23–25	25–17	17–19	112–104	P2 P3

==== Final ====
Date	Time		Score		Set 1	Set 2	Set 3	Set 4	Set 5	Total	Report
17 Aug	20:08	Argentina	1–3	Brazil	25–22	33–35	17–25	21–25		96–107	P2 P3

== Final standing ==
Rank	Team
1st place, gold medalist(s)	Brazil
2nd place, silver medalist(s)	Argentina
3rd place, bronze medalist(s)	Venezuela
4	Canada
5	Mexico
6	United States
7	Puerto Rico
8	Dominican Republic

2015 Men's Pan-American Cup
champions

Brazil
Third title

12–man roster
Alan, Wagner, Éder Koch, Rogério, Leandro, Carlos Eduardo, Fernando, Batagim, João, Flávio, Thiago, Douglas
Head coach
Rubinho

== Awards ==
=== Best players ===
- Most valuable player
  (Brazil) Alan Souza
- Best scorer
  (Dominican Republic) Luis David Adames
- Best spiker
  (Canada) Stephen Maar
- Best blocker
  (Brazil) Flávio Gualberto
- Best server
  (Canada) Casey Schouten
- Best setter
  (Argentina) Demián González
- Best receiver
  (Brazil) Rogério Carvalho Filho
- Best digger
  (Argentina) Facundo Santuacci
- Best libero
  (Mexico) Jesús Rangel

=== All–star team ===
- Best setter
  (Argentina) Demián González
- Best outside spikers
  (Canada) Stephen Maar
  (Venezuela) Willner Rivas
- Best middle blockers
  (Brazil) Flávio Gualberto
  (Dominican Republic) Mario Frías
- Best opposite spiker
  (Canada) Casey Schouten
- Best libero
  (Mexico) Jesús Rangel
