= 2008 Men's Pan-American Volleyball Cup =

Volleyball tournament

The 2008 Pan-American Volleyball Cup was the third edition of the annual men's volleyball tournament, played by seven countries from June 2 to June 7, 2008, in Winnipeg, Manitoba, Canada. The winner of each pool automatically advanced to the semi-finals and the teams placed in second and third met in crossed matches in the quarterfinals round.

== Competing nations ==
Group A	Group B
United States; Mexico; Costa Rica	Canada; Dominican Republic; Puerto Rico; Trinidad and Tobago

== Preliminary round ==
=== Group A ===
Rk	Team	Points	W	L	SW	SL	Ratio
1	United States	4	2	0	6	0	MAX
2	Mexico	3	1	1	3	3	0.500
3	Costa Rica	2	0	2	0	6	0.000

June 2, 2008

Costa Rica	0–3	United States	15–25, 18–25, 17–25

June 3, 2008

United States	3–0	Mexico	25–20, 25–11, 25–16

June 4, 2008

Costa Rica	0–3	Mexico	19–25, 27–29, 17–25

=== Group B ===
Rk	Team	Points	W	L	SW	SL	Ratio
1	Canada	6	3	0	9	0	MAX
2	Dominican Republic	5	2	1	6	4	0.600
3	Puerto Rico	4	1	2	4	8	0.333
4	Trinidad and Tobago	3	0	3	2	9	0.182

June 2, 2008

Puerto Rico	1–3	Dominican Republic	20–25, 19–25, 25–22, 21–25
Canada	3–0	Trinidad and Tobago	25–12, 25–13, 25–13

June 3, 2008

Canada	3–0	Puerto Rico	25–14, 25–15, 25–13
Dominican Republic	3–0	Trinidad and Tobago	25–17, 25–22, 27–25

June 4, 2008

Puerto Rico	3–2	Trinidad and Tobago	20–25, 25–21, 22–25, 25–14, 15–13
Canada	3–0	Dominican Republic	25–19, 25–20, 25–22

== Final round ==
Semi-finals
2008-06-06 – Winnipeg, Manitoba
United States	3
Dominican Republic	1
2008-06-06 – Winnipeg, Manitoba
Canada	3
Mexico	1

Final
2008-06-07 – Winnipeg, Manitoba
United States	3
Canada	1
3rd place
2008-06-07 – Winnipeg, Manitoba
Dominican Republic	3
Mexico	2

=== Quarterfinals ===
- Thursday June 5, 2008

Mexico	3–0	Puerto Rico	25–22, 25–22, 25–19
Dominican Republic	3–0	Costa Rica	25–21, 28–26, 25–15

=== Classification 5–6 ===
- Friday June 6, 2008

Puerto Rico	1–3	Costa Rica	23–25, 22–25, 25–20, 23–25

=== Semifinals ===
- Friday June 6, 2008

United States	3–1	Dominican Republic	25–22, 32–30, 22–25, 25–23
Canada	3–1	Mexico	18–25, 25–22, 25–12, 25–18

=== Classification 6–7 ===
- Saturday June 7, 2008

Trinidad and Tobago	3–1	Puerto Rico	25–23, 18–25, 25–22, 25–23

=== Championship Round ===
- Saturday June 7, 2008

Dominican Republic	3–2	Mexico	23–25, 25–21, 23–25, 25–18, 15–12
United States	3–1	Canada	25–22, 27–29, 25–22, 25–22

== Final ranking ==
Place	Team
1.	United States
2.	Canada
3.	Dominican Republic
4.	Mexico
5.	Costa Rica
6.	Trinidad and Tobago
7.	Puerto Rico

2008 Men's Pan-American Cup winners

United States
Second title

== Individual awards ==
- Most valuable player
  - Evan Patak (USA)
- Best scorer
  - Elvis Contreras (DOM)
- Best spiker
  - Gavin Schmitt (CAN)
- Best blocker
  - Tomás Aguilera (MEX)
- Best server
  - Evan Patak (USA)
- Best digger
  - Alvaro Cascante (CRC)
- Best setter
  - Pedro Rangel (MEX)
