= Evan Patak =

American volleyball player (born 1984)

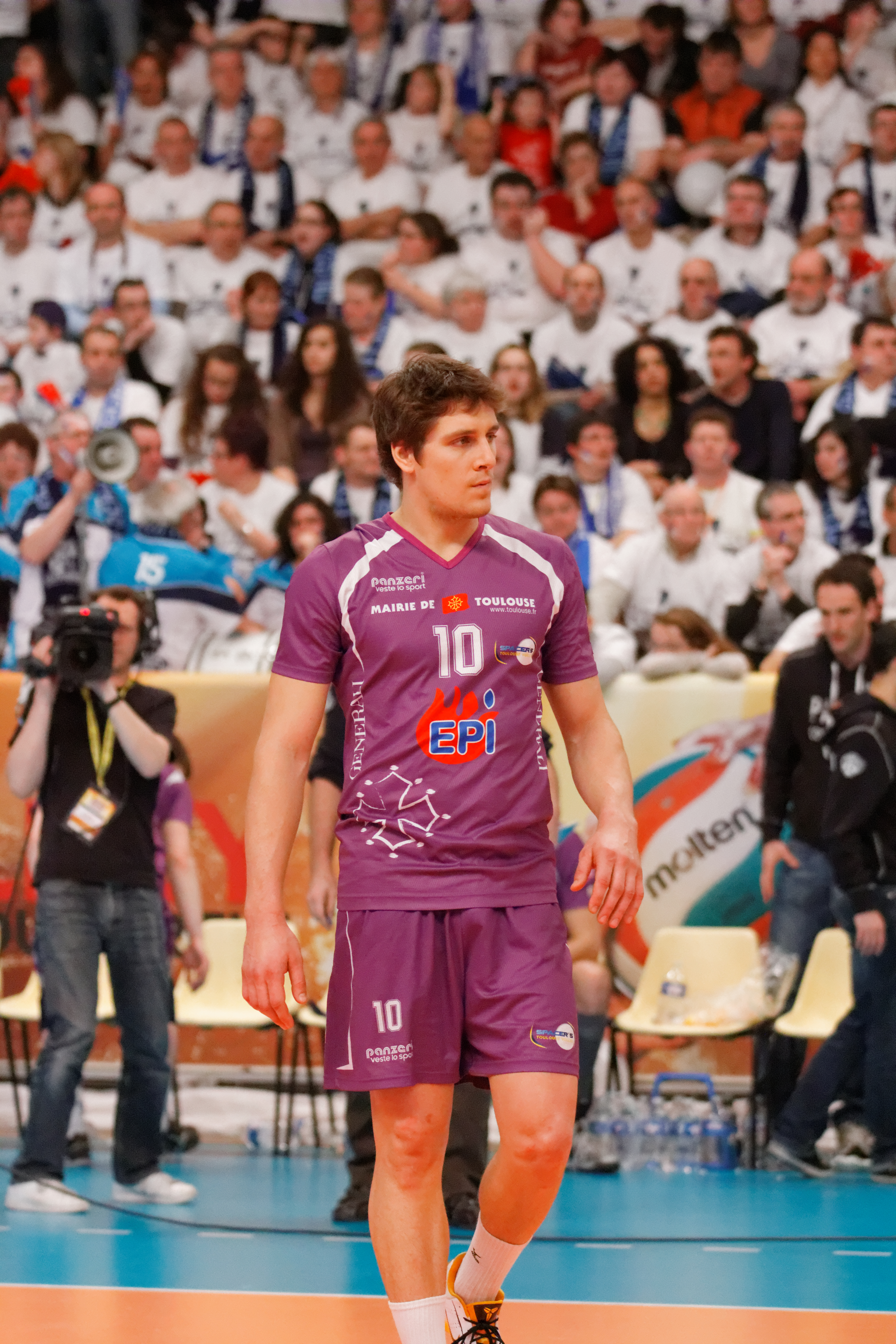
- Patak with Spacer's de Toulouse in 2013

Personal information
- Full name: Evan Hoburg Patak
- Born: June 23, 1984 (age 42); Santa Maria, California, U.S.
- Hometown: Pleasanton, California, U.S.
- Height: 6 ft 8 in (2.03 m)
- Weight: 249 lb (113 kg)
- Spike: 143 in (363 cm)
- Block: 130 in (330 cm)
- Education: UC Santa Barbara Gauchos

Volleyball information
- Position: Opposite

Career
Years	Teams
1998–2002; 2003–2007; 2007; 2007–2008; 2008; 2008–2009; 2009; 2009–2010; 2010–2011; 2011–2012; 2012; 2013	Foothill High School; UC Santa Barbara Gauchos; Playeros de San Juan; Aris Volleyball Club; Indios de Mayagüez aon hotVolleys; P.A.O.K. Thessaloniki V.C. Halkbank Ankara; Incheon Korean Air Jumbos; Umbria Volley; Plataneros de Corozal; Spacer's de Toulouse

National team
2008–	United States
Medal record
Men's volleyball
Representing the United States
World University Games
Bronze medal – third place	2003 Daegu	Team competition
Bronze medal – third place	2007 Bangkok	Team competition
NORCECA Men's Volleyball Championship
Silver medal – second place	2009 Bayamón	Team competition
Silver medal – second place	2011 Mayagüez	Team competition
Pan-American Cup
Gold medal – first place	2008 Winnipeg	Team competition
- Last updated: September 25, 2014

Evan Hoburg Patak (born June 23, 1984) is an American volleyball player who is a member of the United States men's national volleyball team.

== Early life and education ==
Patak grew up in Pleasanton, California and attended Foothill High School where he played for the school's volleyball team. He was named to the First Team All-East Bay Athletic League three times, earning the title Most Valuable Player in his senior year. He also played club volleyball for Diablo Valley Volleyball Club.

Following graduation, Patak enrolled at the University of California, Santa Barbara and played for the UC Santa Barbara Gauchos. After redshirting in 2003, he played 4 seasons with the Gauchos. He was named the 2004 AVCA Newcomer of the Year and a three-time All-American. He also led the nation in kills in 2005.

== Career ==
Patak joined the professional ranks right out of college in 2007 and joined Puerto Rican-based club Playeros de San Juan in the Liga de Voleibol Superior Masculino. His stay was brief, leaving them for Aris Volleyball Club in the Greek A1 Ethniki before the end of the year. Patak returned to the Puerto Rican LVSM in 2008. According to then-manager Jorge de Jesús, he nearly rejoined his old Playeros de San Juan team, now rebranded as Mets de Guaynabo, but ultimately joined Indios de Mayagüez. Due to the 2008 Summer Olympics and his contract with the U.S. National Team, Patak joined Indios de Mayagüez after their season had started.

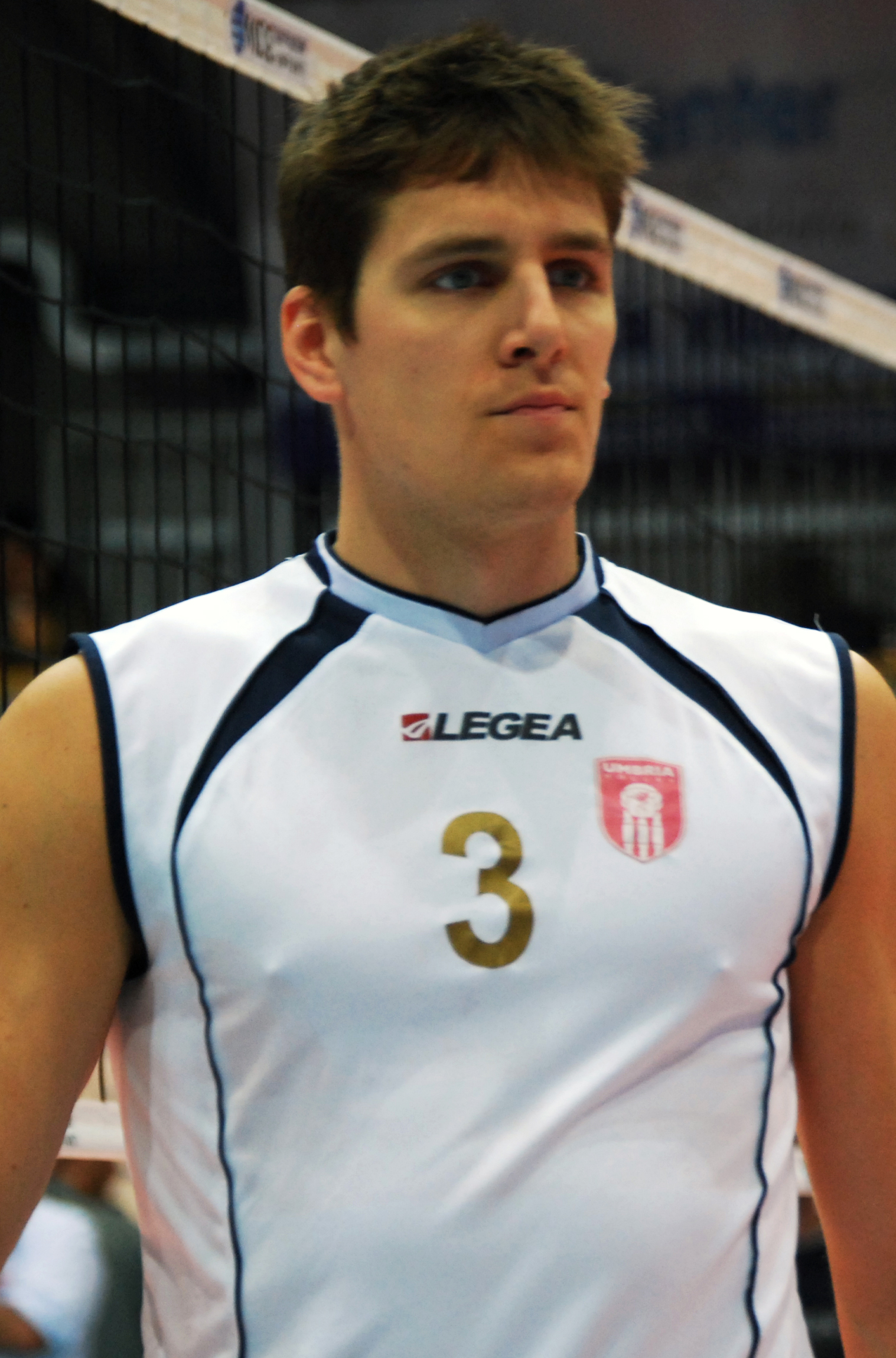
Patak with Umbria Volley in 2012

The offseason saw another move as Patak joined Austrian-based aon hotVolleys in the Fall of 2008. He played with the team until January 9, 2009 when his contract was mutually terminated due to the club's financial constraints. He returned to the Greek A1 Ethniki that same month after signing with P.A.O.K. Thessaloniki V.C. He joined Turkish club Halkbank Ankara of the Turkish Men's Volleyball League in Summer of 2009. He stayed with the club through early May 2010.

After Greece, Patak joined the South Korean V-League club Incheon Korean Air Jumbos. They ended with the best regular season record in the V-League for the 2010–2011 season but lost in the championship playoffs finals. He returned to Europe to play for Italian club Umbria Volley of the Italian Volleyball League in December 2011.

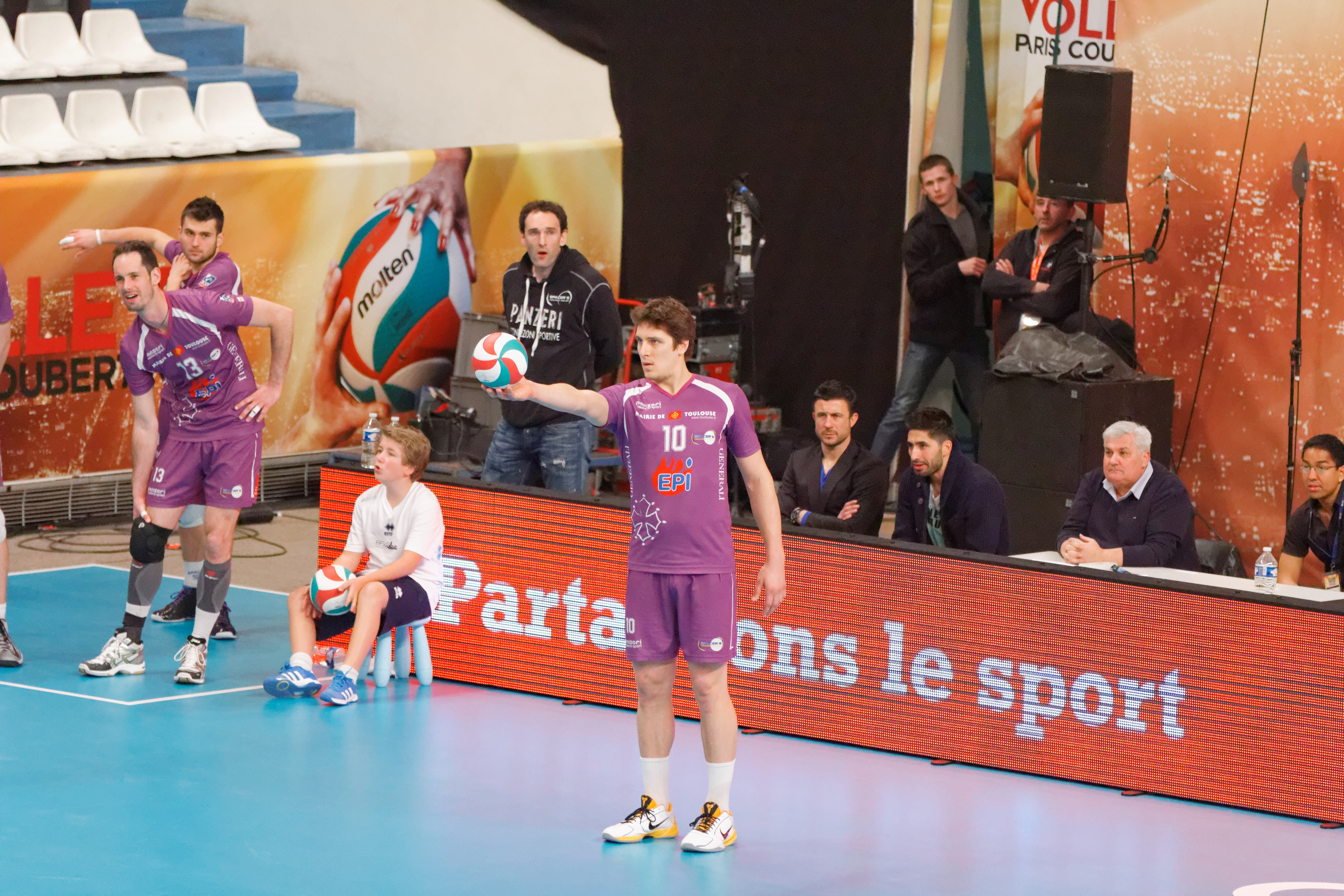
Patak preparing to serve with Spacer's de Toulouse in 2013

Patak landed in Puerto Rico for the third time in October 2012. He signed for Plataneros de Corozal after Dallas Soonais was lost to a shoulder injury. After a semi-finals loss that ended Plataneros de Corozal's season, Patak joined Spacer's de Toulouse in January 2013. He proved to be a huge catalyst to turn Spacer's season around, making a run in the Coupe de France but ultimately coming in second best. Despite his play, he was not brought back for a second season.

=== International ===
Patak has been a member of the full United States men's national volleyball team since 2008. He was initially a member of the U.S. delegation for the World University Games in 2003 and 2007 earning a bronze medal in both trips. Patak was on track to also participate in the 2005 Games but did not participate due to injury. He also joined for a six-city tour against Japan.

After leaving UC Santa Barbara, Patak's first action with the senior men's national team was in the 2008 NORCECA Continental Olympic Qualifying Preliminary Matches, 2008 Four Nations Tournament, 2008 Men's Pan-American Volleyball Cup, 2008 FIVB Volleyball World League, and 2008 Volleyball America's Cup. Despite being named to the 2008 Summer Games preliminary roster, Patak missed being named to the final roster and was subsequently named an alternate. U.S. assistant coach Rick McLaughlin tipped Patak as having the potential to peak in 2012 for the London Games.

He was a mainstay for the United States moving forward, appearing in several major competitions including the 2009 Men's NORCECA Volleyball Championship, 2010 FIVB Volleyball Men's World Championship qualification (NORCECA), 2009 FIVB Volleyball World League, 2010 FIVB Volleyball World League, 2011 FIVB Volleyball Men's World Cup, 2011 Pan American Games, 2011 Men's NORCECA Volleyball Championship, 2011 FIVB Volleyball World League, and 2012 FIVB Volleyball World League.

Despite being regularly featured, Patak was named an alternative to the 2012 London Summer Olympics and again named an alternate.

He was named to the 2013 FIVB Volleyball World League preliminary roster but did not have any court time.
