= Gavin Schmitt =

Canadian volleyball player

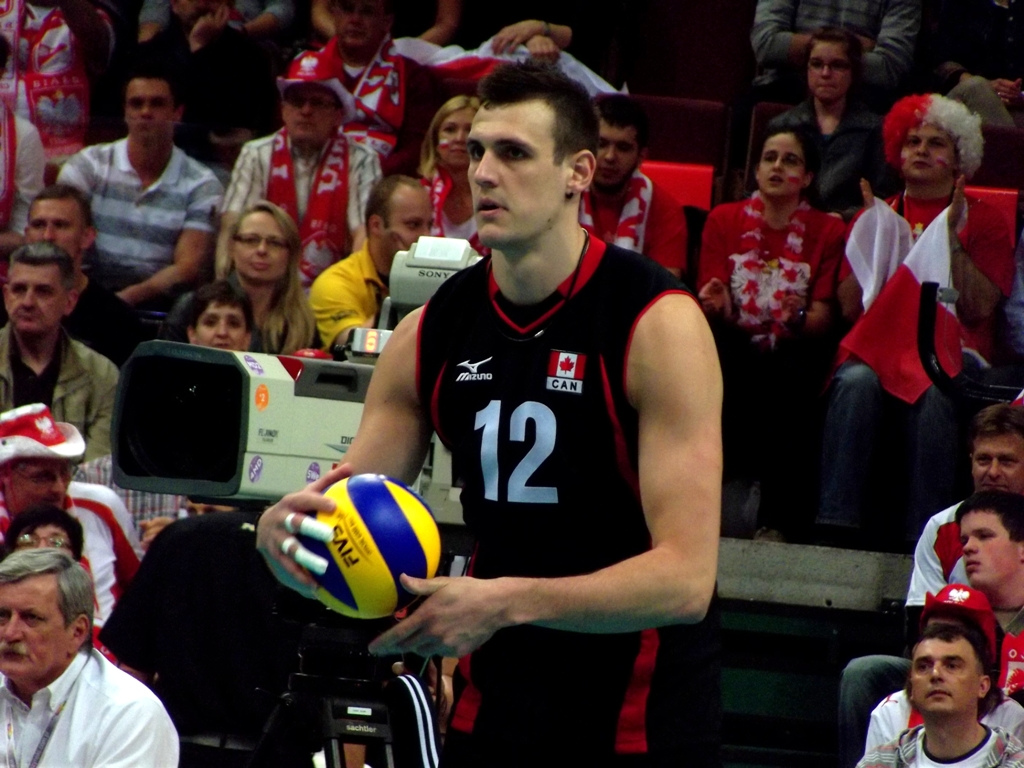

Personal information
- Full name: Gavin Charles Schmitt
- Nationality: (Canada) Canadian
- Born: January 27, 1986 (age 40); Grande Prairie, Alberta, Canada
- Hometown: Saskatoon, Saskatchewan
- Height: 2.08 m (6 ft 10 in)
- Education: University of Saskatchewan; Red Deer College

Volleyball information
- Position: Opposite

Career
Years	Teams
2004–2005; 2006–2007; 2007–2008; 2008–2009; 2009–2012; 2012–2013; 2013–2015; 2015–2016; 2016–2017; 2017–2018; 2018–2019; 2019–2020; 2020	Saskatchewan Huskies; Red Deer College; Ethnikos Alexandroupolis; Arago de Sète; Daejeon Samsung Bluefangs; Iskra Odintsovo; Arkas Izmir; Funvic Taubaté; Asseco Resovia Rzeszów; Toray Arrows; Olympiacos Piraeus; Suwon KEPCO Vixtorm

National team
2007–2018	Canada
Honours
Men's Volleyball
Representing Canada
NORCECA Championship
Silver medal – second place	2013 Canada
Bronze medal – third place	2011 Puerto Rico

Gavin Charles Schmitt (born 27 January 1986) is a former Canadian volleyball player, who started playing volleyball in Saskatoon for the Saskatchewan Huskies volleyball club and eventually went on to win the silver medal with the Canada men's national volleyball team at the 2013 NORCECA Volleyball Championship in Langley, Canada.

== Career ==
From 2009 to 2012, Schmitt played for the Daejeon Samsung Bluefangs in South Korea's V-League, where he led the team to three consecutive titles winning the MVP awards in the 2009–10 and 2011–12 seasons.

Schmitt led the national team in scoring in six of the seven matches he played for Canada at the 2014 World Championship in Poland, where Canada finished seventh for its best result ever in the championship that has been held 18 times since 1949.

In July 2016, he was named to Canada's 2016 Olympic team.

== Sporting achievements ==
- CSV South American Club Championship
  - Brazil 2016 – with Funvic Taubaté
- National championships
  - 2009/2010 KOVO Cup, with Daejeon Samsung
  - 2009/2010 V-League Championship, with Daejeon Samsung
  - 2010/2011 V-League Championship, with Daejeon Samsung
  - 2011/2012 V-League Championship, with Daejeon Samsung
  - 2014/2015 Turkish Championship, with Arkas Izmir
  - 2018/2019 Greek Championship, with Olympiacos Piraeus
  - 2018/2019 Greek Cup, with Olympiacos Piraeus
- National team
  - 2008 Pan American Cup
  - 2009 Pan American Cup
  - 2011 Pan American Cup
  - 2011 NORCECA Championship
  - 2013 NORCECA Championship
  - 2015 Pan American Games

=== Individually ===
- 2008: Pan American Cup – Best opposite
- 2009: Pan American Cup – Best scorer
- 2010: V-League Championship – Most valuable player
- 2010: V-League Championship – Best scorer
- 2010: V-League Championship – Best opposite
- 2010: V-League Championship – Best server
- 2011: V-League Championship – Best scorer
- 2011: Pan American Cup – Best opposite
- 2011: Pan American Cup – Best scorer
- 2012: V-League Championship – Most valuable player
- 2012: V-League Championship – Best scorer
- 2012: V-League Championship – Best opposite
- 2015: Turkish Championship – Most valuable player
- 2015: Turkish Championship – Best scorer
- 2015: Turkish Championship – Best opposite
- 2015: Turkish Championship – Best server
- 2015: Pan American Games – Best scorer, Best Server
- 2016: 1st World Olympic Qualification Tournament – Best opposite spiker
- 2019 Greek Championship – Best opposite

=== Records ===
- 2011/2012: 58 points in one match in – V-League
