= Men's Pan-American Volleyball Cup =

Men's volleyball tournament organized by NORCECA

- Current season, competition or edition: 2026 Men's Pan-American Volleyball Cup
- Sport: Volleyball
- Founded: 2006; 20 years ago
- First season: 2006
- Continents: NORCECA
- Most recent champions: United States (6th title)
- Most titles: United States (6 titles)

The Men's Pan-American Volleyball Cup is a men's volleyball tournament organized by NORCECA. Initially, only NORCECA teams participated, but CSV teams have been invited since 2010. The event served as a qualifier for World League and the America's Cup. Now, the event serves as an America qualifier for the Pan American Games classification. The women have their own equivalent of the tournament, the Women's Pan-American Cup.

== Results ==
Pan-American Cup
| Year | Host | Champion | Runner-up | 3rd place |
|---|---|---|---|---|
| 2006; Details | Mexicali & Tijuana, Mexico | United States | Dominican Republic | Canada |
| 2007; Details | Santo Domingo, Dominican Republic | Mexico | Puerto Rico | Cuba |
| 2008; Details | Winnipeg, Canada | United States | Canada | Dominican Republic |
| 2009; Details | Chiapas, Mexico | United States | Canada | Dominican Republic |
| 2010; Details | San Juan, Puerto Rico | United States | Argentina | Puerto Rico |
| 2011; Details | Gatineau, Canada | Brazil | United States | Canada |
| 2012; Details | Santo Domingo, Dominican Republic | United States | Argentina | Dominican Republic |
| 2013; Details | Mexico City, Mexico | Brazil | Mexico | Argentina |
| 2014; Details | Tijuana, Mexico | Cuba | United States | Argentina |
| 2015; Details | Reno, Nevada, United States | Brazil | Argentina | Venezuela |
| 2016; Details | Mexico City, Mexico | Cuba | Argentina | Canada |
| 2017; Details | Gatineau, Canada | Argentina | Puerto Rico | Cuba |
| 2018; Details | Córdoba, Mexico | Argentina | Brazil | Cuba |
| 2019; Details | Colima City, Mexico | Cuba | Argentina | Mexico |
| 2020 | Cancelled due to COVID-19 pandemic | | | |
| 2021; Exceptional edition | Santo Domingo, Dominican Republic | Mexico | Canada | United States |
| 2022; Details | Gatineau, Canada | Cuba | Canada | United States |
| 2023; Details | Guadalajara, Mexico | Canada | Brazil | Chile |
| 2024; Details | Santo Domingo, Dominican Republic | Canada | United States | Puerto Rico |
| 2025; Details | León, Mexico | Venezuela | Mexico | Canada |
| 2026; Details | Cuernavaca, Mexico | United States | Puerto Rico | Canada |

== Medal table ==
| Rank | Nation | Gold | Silver | Bronze | Total |
|---|---|---|---|---|---|
| 1 | United States | 6 | 3 | 1 | 10 |
| 2 | Cuba | 4 | 0 | 3 | 7 |
| 3 | Brazil | 3 | 2 | 0 | 5 |
| 4 | Argentina | 2 | 5 | 2 | 9 |
| 5 | Canada | 2 | 3 | 5 | 10 |
| 6 | Mexico | 1 | 2 | 1 | 4 |
| 7 | Venezuela | 1 | 0 | 1 | 2 |
| 8 | Puerto Rico | 0 | 3 | 2 | 5 |
| 9 | Dominican Republic | 0 | 1 | 3 | 4 |
| 10 | Chile | 0 | 0 | 1 | 1 |
| Totals (10 entries) | | 19 | 19 | 19 | 57 |

== Participating nations ==
| Nation | (Mexico) 2006 | (Dominican Republic) 2007 | (Canada) 2008 | (Mexico) 2009 | (Puerto Rico) 2010 | (Canada) 2011 | (Dominican Republic) 2012 | (Mexico) 2013 | (Mexico) 2014 | (United States) 2015 | (Mexico) 2016 | (Canada) 2017 | (Mexico) 2018 | (Mexico) 2019 | (Dominican Republic) 2021* | (Canada) 2022 | (Mexico) 2023 | (Dominican Republic) 2024 | (Mexico) 2025 | (Mexico) 2026 | Years |
|---|---|---|---|---|---|---|---|---|---|---|---|---|---|---|---|---|---|---|---|---|---|
| Antigua and Barbuda | – | – | – | – | – | – | – | – | – | – | – | – | – | – | – | – | – | – | 12th | – | 1 |
| Argentina | – | – | – | – | 2nd | 7th | 2nd | 3rd | 3rd | 2nd | 2nd | 1st | 1st | 2nd | – | – | – | – | – | – | 10 |
| Bahamas | – | – | – | – | – | 9th | – | – | – | – | – | – | – | – | – | – | – | – | – | – | 1 |
| Brazil | – | – | – | – | 4th | 1st | 4th | 1st | – | 1st | – | – | 2nd | – | – | 8th | 2nd | – | – | – | 8 |
| Canada | 3rd | 4th | 2nd | 2nd | 5th | 3rd | 6th | – | 7th | 4th | 3rd | 4th | 6th | 7th | 2nd | 2nd | 1st | 1st | 3rd | 3rd | 19 |
| Chile | – | – | – | – | – | – | – | – | – | – | 7th | – | 8th | 4th | – | 4th | 3rd | 7th | 5th | – | 7 |
| Colombia | – | – | – | – | 8th | – | – | – | 9th | – | 8th | – | 9th | – | – | – | 6th | 6th | 4th | – | 7 |
| Costa Rica | – | – | 5th | – | – | – | – | – | – | – | 9th | – | – | – | – | – | – | – | – | 8th | 3 |
| Cuba | 5th | 3rd | – | – | – | – | – | – | 1st | – | 1st | 3rd | 3rd | 1st | – | 1st | 8th | 4th | 7th | 6th | 12 |
| Curaçao | – | – | – | – | – | – | – | – | – | – | – | – | – | – | – | – | – | – | – | 9th | 1 |
| Dominican Republic | 2nd | 5th | 3rd | 3rd | 6th | 8th | 3rd | 6th | 8th | 8th | 6th | 6th | 10th | 9th | 4th | 7th | 10th | 5th | 9th | 5th | 20 |
| Guatemala | – | – | – | 6th | – | – | – | – | – | – | – | – | 11th | 10th | – | – | – | 10th | 11th | 7th | 6 |
| Honduras | – | – | – | – | – | – | – | – | – | – | 10th | – | – | – | – | – | – | – | – | – | 1 |
| Mexico | 4th | 1st | 4th | 5th | 7th | 5th | 5th | 2nd | 6th | 5th | 4th | 8th | 5th | 3rd | 1st | 6th | 4th | 8th | 2nd | 4th | 20 |
| Panama | 7th | 7th | – | 7th | – | 10th | – | – | – | – | – | – | – | – | – | – | – | – | – | – | 4 |
| Peru | – | – | – | – | – | – | – | – | – | – | – | – | 12th | 8th | – | – | 7th | 9th | – | – | 4 |
| Puerto Rico | – | 2nd | 7th | 4th | 3rd | 4th | – | 4th | 4th | 7th | – | 2nd | 4th | 6th | 5th | 5th | 9th | 3rd | 8th | 2nd | 17 |
| Suriname | – | – | – | – | – | – | – | – | – | – | – | – | – | 12th | 6th | – | – | – | 10th | – | 3 |
| Trinidad and Tobago | 6th | 6th | 6th | – | – | – | 8th | 7th | – | – | – | – | – | 11th | – | – | – | – | – | 10th | 7 |
| United States | 1st | – | 1st | 1st | 1st | 2nd | 1st | 5th | 2nd | 6th | 5th | 5th | 7th | 5th | 3rd | 3rd | 5th | 2nd | 6th | 1st | 19 |
| Venezuela | – | – | – | – | 9th | 6th | 7th | – | 5th | 3rd | – | 7th | – | – | – | – | – | – | 1st | – | 7 |
| Total | 7 | 7 | 7 | 7 | 9 | 10 | 8 | 7 | 9 | 8 | 10 | 8 | 12 | 12 | 6 | 8 | 10 | 10 | 12 | 10 | – |

* = exceptional edition

== MVP by edition ==
- 2006 – (Dominican Republic) Elvis Contreras
- 2007 – (Mexico) José Martell
- 2008 – (United States) Evan Patak
- 2009 – (United States) Dean Bittner
- 2010 – (United States) Jayson Jablonsky
- 2011 – (Brazil) Paulo Victor Silva
- 2012 – (United States) Taylor Sander
- 2013 – (Brazil) Ricardo Lucarelli
- 2014 – (Cuba) Rolando Cepeda
- 2015 – (Brazil) Alan Souza
- 2016 – (Cuba) Abrahan Alfonso Gavilán
- 2017 – (Argentina) Martín Ramos
- 2018 – (Argentina) Ezequiel Palacios
- 2019 – (Cuba) Miguel Ángel López
- 2021 – (Mexico) Diego González
- 2022 – (Cuba) Osniel Melgarejo
- 2023 – (Canada) Isaac Heslinga
- 2024 – (Canada) Jesse Elser
- 2025 – (Venezuela) Willner Rivas
- 2026 – (United States) Patrick Rogers

== See also ==
- Men's Junior Pan-American Volleyball Cup
- Boys' Youth Pan-American Volleyball Cup
