= 2006 Men's Pan-American Volleyball Cup =

Men's volleyball tournament

The 2006 Men's Pan-American Volleyball Cup was the first edition of the annual men's volleyball tournament, played by seven countries from June 3 to June 12, 2006 in Tijuana and Mexicali, Mexico. The event served as a qualifier for the 2007 America's Cup in Brazil, where the top three teams will join the teams from Argentina and Brazil. The winner of each pool automatically advanced to the semi-finals and the teams placed in second and third met in crossed matches in the quarterfinals round.

== Competing nations ==
Group A — Mexicali	Group B — Tijuana
Canada; Dominican Republic; Mexico; Trinidad and Tobago	Cuba; Panama; United States

== Preliminary round ==
=== Group A ===
- Monday June 5

Canada	3 – 1	Dominican R.	23–25 25–19 25–18 25–18
Mexico	3 – 0	Trinidad & T.	26–24 25–20 25–14

- Tuesday June 6

Dominican R.	3 – 0	Trinidad & T.	26–24 25–16 25–20
Canada	2 – 3	Mexico	21–25 21–25 25–19 25–14 19–21

- Wednesday June 7

Canada	3 – 0	Trinidad & T.	25–17 25–9 25–19
Mexico	3 – 2	Dominican R.	23–25 25–21 17–25 25–21 15–12

=== Group B ===
- Monday June 5

United States	3 – 0	Panama	25–11 25–9 25-08

- Tuesday June 6

Panama	0 – 3	Cuba	10–25 16–25 16–25

- Wednesday June 7

Cuba	2 – 3	United States	25–20 18–25 23–25 25–21 09-15

== Final round ==
Semi-finals
2006-06-10 – Mexicali, Mexico
Mexico	0
Dominican Republic	3
2006-06-10 – Mexicali, Mexico
United States	3
Canada	0

Final
2006-06-11 – Mexicali, Mexico
Dominican Republic	1
United States	3
3rd place
2006-06-11 – Mexicali, Mexico
Mexico	0
Canada	3

=== Quarterfinals ===
- Friday June 9, 2006

Canada	3 – 0	Panama	25–14 25–15 25–19
Cuba	1 – 3	Dominican R.	23–25 26–28 25–21 20–25

=== Semi-finals ===
- Saturday June 10, 2006

Mexico	0 – 3	Dominican R.	24–26 20–25 23–25
United States	3 – 0	Canada	25–23 26–24 25–19

=== Finals ===
- Sunday June 11, 2006 — Seventh Place Match

Trinidad & T.	3 – 1	Panama	25–23 25–17 23–25 25–17

- Saturday June 10, 2006 — Fifth Place Match

Panama	0 – 3	Cuba	17–25 11–25 17–25

- Sunday June 11, 2006 — Bronze Medal Match

Mexico	0 – 3	Canada	22–25 18–25 22–25

- Sunday June 11, 2006 — Gold Medal Match

Dominican R.	1 – 3	United States	25–17 20–25 17–25 23–25

== Final ranking ==
Place	Team
1.	United States
2.	Dominican Republic
3.	Canada
4.	Mexico
5.	Cuba
6.	Trinidad and Tobago
7.	Panama

2006 Men's Pan-American Cup winners

United States
First title

  - United States, Dominican Republic and Canada qualified for the 2007 Volleyball America's Cup

== Awards ==
- Most valuable player
  - (Dominican Republic) Elvis Contreras
- Best spiker
  - (Mexico) José Martell
- Best scorer
  - (Dominican Republic) Elvis Contreras
- Best defender
  - (United States) Richard Lambourne
- Best setter
  - (Dominican Republic) Cristian Cruz
- Best server
  - (Cuba) Rolando Junquin
- Best libero
  - (Dominican Republic) Carlos Velásquez
- Best blocker
  - (Canada) Murray Grapentine
