= 2021 Men's Pan-American Volleyball Cup =

Tournament details
- Host country: Dominican Republic
- Dates: 3–9 September
- Teams: 6
- Venue: 1 (in 1 host city)

Final positions
- Champions: Mexico (2nd title)
- Runners-up: Canada
- Third place: United States
- Fourth place: Dominican Republic

Tournament awards
- MVP: (Mexico) Diego González

The 2021 Men's Pan-American Volleyball Cup was an exceptional edition of the annual men's volleyball tournament, played by six countries from 3 to 9 September in Santo Domingo, Dominican Republic.

Mexico won the title after defeating Canada in the final by 3–0. Diego González was awarded the Most Valuable Player.

== Competing nations ==
Teams

Canada
Dominican Republic
Mexico
Puerto Rico
Suriname
United States

== Competition format ==
The competition format for the 2011 Pan-American Volleyball Cup consists of two phases, the first is a round robin round between all six competing nations. The top four teams advanced to the semifinals.

=== Pool standing procedure ===
Match won 3–0: 5 points for the winner, 0 point for the loser; Match won 3–1: 4 points for the winner, 1 points for the loser; Match won 3–2: 3 points for the winner, 2 points for the loser; The first criterion is the number of matches won, second criterion is points gained by the team. In case of tie, the teams were classified according to the following criteria: points ratio and sets ratio.

== Results ==
- All times are Atlantic Time Zone (UTC−04:00).

Pos	Team	Pld	W	L	Pts	SPW	SPL	SPR	SW	SL	SR	Qualification
1	United States	5	4	1	20	439	381	1.152	14	5	2.800	Semifinals
2	Canada	5	4	1	19	481	421	1.143	14	6	2.333	Semifinals
3	Dominican Republic	5	3	2	15	473	446	1.061	12	9	1.333	Semifinals
4	Mexico	5	3	2	14	413	372	1.110	10	8	1.250	Semifinals
5	Puerto Rico	5	1	4	6	412	429	0.960	5	13	0.385	Fifth place match
6	Suriname	5	0	5	1	232	401	0.579	1	15	0.067	Fifth place match

Date	Time		Score		Set 1	Set 2	Set 3	Set 4	Set 5	Total	Report
3 Sep	15:00	Suriname	0–3	Canada	7–25	28–30	20–25			55–80	P2 P3
3 Sep	17:00	United States	3–0	Mexico	25–17	29–27	25–20			79–64	P2 P3
3 Sep	19:00	Dominican Republic	3–1	Puerto Rico	31–29	31–33	27–25	27–25		116–112	P2 P3
4 Sep	15:00	Mexico	1–3	Canada	25–27	23–25	25–21	21–25		94–98	P2 P3
4 Sep	17:00	United States	3–0	Puerto Rico	25–17	25–23	26–24			76–64	P2 P3
4 Sep	19:00	Dominican Republic	3–0	Suriname	25–14	25–7	25–14			75–35	P2 P3
5 Sep	15:00	Suriname	0–3	Mexico	12–25	10–25	17–25			39–75	P2 P3
5 Sep	17:00	Puerto Rico	1–3	Canada	19–25	25–23	20–25	19–25		83–98	P2 P3
5 Sep	19:00	Dominican Republic	3–2	United States	25–23	25–18	22–25	17–25	15–8	104–99	P2 P3
6 Sep	15:00	United States	3–0	Suriname	25–14	25–11	25–14			75–39	P2 P3
6 Sep	17:00	Mexico	3–0	Puerto Rico	25–16	25–23	25–18			75–57	P2 P3
6 Sep	19:00	Dominican Republic	1–3	Canada	25–20	23–25	15–25	16–25		79–95	P2 P3
7 Sep	15:00	Puerto Rico	3–1	Suriname	25–14	21–25	25–15	25–10		96–64	P2 P3
7 Sep	17:00	Canada	2–3	United States	25–21	18–25	29–31	25–18	13–15	110–110	P2 P3
7 Sep	19:00	Dominican Republic	2–3	Mexico	18–25	25–21	25–19	18–25	13–15	99–105	P2 P3

== Final round ==
Semifinals
Canada	3
Dominican Republic	0
United States	0
Mexico	3

Final
Canada	0
Mexico	3
Third place
Dominican Republic	1
United States	3

=== Semifinals ===
Date	Time		Score		Set 1	Set 2	Set 3	Set 4	Set 5	Total	Report
8 Sep	17:00	United States	0–3	Mexico	22–25	27–29	20–25			69–79	P2 P3
8 Sep	19:00	Canada	3–0	Dominican Republic	25–22	25–22	25–20			75–64	P2 P3

=== Fifth place match ===
Date	Time		Score		Set 1	Set 2	Set 3	Set 4	Set 5	Total	Report
8 Sep	15:00	Puerto Rico	3–1	Suriname	25–16	20–25	28–26	27–25		100–92	P2 P3

=== Third place match ===
Date	Time		Score		Set 1	Set 2	Set 3	Set 4	Set 5	Total	Report
9 Sep	17:00	Dominican Republic	1–3	United States	22–25	25–19	23–25	15–25		85–94	P2 P3

=== Final ===
Date	Time		Score		Set 1	Set 2	Set 3	Set 4	Set 5	Total	Report
9 Sep	19:00	Canada	0–3	Mexico	17–25	24–26	20–25			61–76	P2 P3

== Final standing ==
Rank	Team
1st place, gold medalist(s)	Mexico
2nd place, silver medalist(s)	Canada
3rd place, bronze medalist(s)	United States
4	Dominican Republic
5	Puerto Rico
6	Suriname

2021 Men's Pan-American Cup champions

Mexico
2nd title

== Individual awards ==
- Most valuable player
  Diego González (MEX)
- Best scorer
  Henry Tapia (DOM)
- Best outside hitters
  Brodie Hofer (CAN)
  Jesse Elser (CAN)
- Best middle blockers
  Jackson Howe (CAN)
  Merrit McHenry (USA)
- Best setter
  Derek Epp (CAN)
- Best Opposite
  Henry Tapia (DOM)
- Best libero
  José Pacheco (PUR)
- Best digger
  José Pacheco (PUR)
- Best receiver
  Colton Loewen (CAN)
- Best server
  Henry Tapia (DOM)
