= 2009 Men's Pan-American Volleyball Cup =

- 2009 Men's Pan-American Cup Logo

Tournament details
- Host country: Mexico
- Dates: June 15 to 20 2009
- Teams: 7
- Venue: Polyforum Chiapas (in Chiapas host cities)

Final positions
- Champions: United States (3rd title)

Tournament awards
- MVP: (United States) Dean Bittner

The 2009 Pan-American Volleyball Cup was the fourth edition of the annual men's volleyball tournament, played by seven countries from June 15 to June 20, 2009, in Chiapas, Mexico. The winner of each pool automatically advanced to the semi-finals and the teams placed in second and third met in crossed matches in the quarterfinals round.

== Competing nations ==
Group A	Group B
United States; Dominican Republic; Canada	Puerto Rico; Panama; Mexico; Guatemala

== Preliminary round ==
=== Group A ===
Rk	Team	Points	W	L	SW	SL	Ratio
1	United States	4	2	0	6	2	3.000
2	Canada	3	1	1	5	4	1.250
3	Dominican Republic	2	0	2	1	6	0.167

June 15, 2009

Dominican Republic	1–3	Canada	25–15, 21–25, 20–25, 18–25

June 16, 2009

United States	3–0	Dominican Republic	31–29, 25–19, 25–20

June 17, 2009

Canada	2–3	United States	22–25, 25–22, 21–25, 26–25, 13–15

=== Group B ===
Rk	Team	Points	W	L	SW	SL	Ratio
1	Puerto Rico	6	3	0	9	0	MAX
2	Mexico	5	2	1	6	3	2.000
3	Guatemala	4	1	2	3	6	0.333
4	Panama	3	0	3	0	9	0.000

June 15, 2009

Puerto Rico	3–0	Panama	25–17, 25–14, 25–22
Mexico	3–0	Guatemala	25–16, 25–23, 25–17

June 16, 2009

Panama	0–3	Guatemala	22–25, 22–25, 18–25
Mexico	0–3	Puerto Rico	31–33, 23–25, 21–25

June 17, 2009

Guatemala	0–3	Puerto Rico	14–25 17–25 18–25
Mexico	3–0	Panama	25–13, 25–18, 26–24

== Final round ==
Semi-finals
2008-06-19 – Chiapas
United States	3
Dominican Republic	0
2008-06-19 – Chiapas
Puerto Rico	1
Canada	3

Final
2008-06-20 – Chiapas
United States	3
Canada	2
3rd place
2008-06-20 – Chiapas
Dominican Republic	3
Puerto Rico	2

=== Quarterfinals ===
- Thursday June 18, 2009

Canada	3–0	Guatemala	25–14, 25–16, 25–19
Mexico	0–3	Dominican Republic	21–25, 19–25, 23–25

=== Classification 5–6 ===
- Friday June 19, 2009

Guatemala	1–3	Mexico	18–25, 19–25, 25–17, 15–25

=== Semifinals ===
- Friday June 19, 2009

United States	3–0	Dominican Republic	25–21, 25–23, 25–14
Puerto Rico	1–3	Canada	18–25 27–25 20–25 24–26

=== Classification 6–7 ===
- Saturday June 7, 2008

Panama	2–3	Guatemala	25–21, 16–25, 25–23, 17–25, 9–15

=== Championship Round ===
- Saturday June 20, 2009

Dominican Republic	3–2	Puerto Rico	25–20, 20–25, 25–20, 21–25, 15–10
United States	3–2	Canada	32–30, 16–25, 24–26, 25–17, 15–12

== Final ranking ==
Place	Team
1.	United States
2.	Canada
3.	Dominican Republic
4.	Puerto Rico
5.	Mexico
6.	Guatemala
7.	Panama

2009 Men's Pan-American Cup winners

United States
Third title

== Individual awards ==
- Most valuable player
  - Dean Bittner (USA)
- Best scorer
  - Gavin Schmitt (CAN)
- Best spiker
  - Juan Figueroa (PUR)
- Best blocker
  - Adam Simac (CAN)
- Best server
  - Iván Pérez (PUR)
- Best digger
  - Mario Becerra (MEX)
- Best setter
  - Fernando Morales (PUR)
- Best receiver
  - Luis Maclao (PAN)
- Best libero
  - Mario Becerra (MEX)
- Rising Star
  - Jeyson Nery Flores (GUA)
