= Puerto Rico men's national volleyball team =

Puerto Rico in international volleyball

Puerto Rico
- Association: Puerto Rican Volleyball Federation
- Confederation: NORCECA
- Head coach: Ossie Antonetti
- FIVB ranking: 26 ▼4 (1 October 2026)

Uniforms
Home	Away

World Championship
- Appearances: 6 (First in 1974)
- Best result: 12th (2006)

World Cup
- Appearances: 1 (First in 2007)
- Best result: 6th (2007)

NORCECA Championship
- Appearances: 24 (First in 1969)
- Best result: (gold) (2021)
- www.yosoyvoli.com (in Spanish)

Puerto Rico men's national volleyball team
Medal record

NORCECA Championship
Gold medal – first place	2021 Durango City	Team
Silver medal – second place	2007 Anaheim	Team
Bronze medal – third place	2009 Bayamón	Team
Bronze medal – third place	2015 Córdoba	Team

Pan-American Cup
Silver medal – second place	2007 Santo Domingo	Team
Silver medal – second place	2017 Gatineau	Team
Silver medal – second place	2026 Cuernavaca	Team
Bronze medal – third place	2010 San Juan	Team

Central American and Caribbean Games
Gold medal – first place	1938 Panama City	Team
Gold medal – first place	2002 San Salvador	Team
Gold medal – first place	2006 Cartagena	Team
Gold medal – first place	2010 Mayaguez	Team
Gold medal – first place	2018 Barranquilla	Team
Silver medal – second place	1935 San Salvador	Team
Silver medal – second place	1946 Barranquilla	Team
Silver medal – second place	1954 Mexico City	Team
Silver medal – second place	1993 Ponce	Team
Silver medal – second place	2014 Veracruz	Team
Bronze medal – third place	1950 Guatemala City	Team
Bronze medal – third place	1959 Caracas	Team
Bronze medal – third place	1986 San Salvador	Team

The Puerto Rico men's national volleyball team represents Puerto Rico in international volleyball competitions and friendly matches. In 2007 the squad won the silver medal at the NORCECA Volleyball Championship after defeating Cuba in the semi-finals. With that performance Puerto Rico for the first time qualified for the Volleyball World Cup, later that year in Japan.

== Results ==
=== World Championship ===
- 1974 – 23rd place
- 2006 – 12th place
- 2010 – 13th place
- 2014 – 21st place
- 2018 – 21st place
- 2022 – 22nd place

=== World Cup ===
- 2007 – 6th place

=== World League ===
- 2011 – 16th place
- 2014 – 27th place
- 2015 – 28th place
- 2016 – 36th place

=== NORCECA Championship ===
- 1969 – 6th place
- 1971 – 4th place
- 1973 – 4th place
- 1975 – Did not participate
- 1977 – 4th place
- 1979 – Did not participate
- 1981 – 5th place
- 1983 – 5th place
- 1985 – 6th place
- 1987 – 6th place
- 1989 – 4th place
- 1991 – 5th place
- 1993 – 4th place
- 1995 – 4th place
- 1997 – 5th place
- 1999 – 5th place
- 2001 – 5th place
- 2003 – 5th place
- 2005 – 5th place
- 2007 – (silver) Runners-up
- 2009 – (bronze) 3rd place
- 2011 – 4th place
- 2013 – 4th place
- 2015 – (bronze) 3rd place
- 2017 – Did not participate
- 2019 – 5th place
- 2021 – (gold) Champions
- 2023 – 6th place
- 2026 – 6th place

=== Pan American Games ===
- 1955 – Did not participate
- 1959 – 8th place
- 1963 – Did not participate
- 1967 – 8th place
- 1971 – 11th place
- 1975 – Did not participate
- 1979 – 6th place
- 1983 – 7th place
- 1987 – Did not participate
- 1991 – 5th place
- 1995 – 6th place
- 1999 – Did not participate
- 2003 – 7th place
- 2007 – 5th place
- 2011 – 7th place
- 2015 – 4th place
- 2019 – 5th place
- 2023 – 8th place

=== Pan-American Cup ===
- 2006 – Did not participate
- 2007 – (silver) Silver medal
- 2008 – 7th place
- 2009 – 4th place
- 2010 – (bronze) Bronze medal
- 2011 – 4th place
- 2012 – Did not participate
- 2013 – 4th place
- 2014 – 4th place
- 2015 – 7th place
- 2016 – Did not participate
- 2017 – (silver) Silver medal
- 2018 – 4th place
- 2019 – 6th place
- 2021 – 5th place
- 2022 – 5th place
- 2023 – 9th place
- 2024 – (bronze) Bronze medal
- 2025 – 8th
- 2026 – (silver) Silver medal

== Current squad ==
The following is the Puerto Rican roster for the 2022 FIVB Volleyball Men's World Championship.

- Head coach: (Puerto Rico) Ossie Antonetti

No.	Name	Date of birth	Height	Weight	Spike	Block	2022–23 club
2	Klistan Lawrence	January 7, 2003	1.96 m (6 ft 5 in)	75 kg (165 lb)	297 cm (117 in)	275 cm (108 in)	(Puerto Rico) National Team
3	Omar Hoyos	December 20, 2001	1.96 m (6 ft 5 in)	75 kg (165 lb)	297 cm (117 in)	275 cm (108 in)	(Puerto Rico) National Team
4	Dennis Del Valle	January 27, 1989	1.75 m (5 ft 9 in)	58 kg (128 lb)	300 cm (120 in)	290 cm (110 in)	(Puerto Rico) Guaynabo
5	Pedro Nieves	June 29, 1993	1.98 m (6 ft 6 in)	92 kg (203 lb)	312 cm (123 in)	305 cm (120 in)	(Puerto Rico) National Team
6	Gregory Torres Cruzado	November 30, 2003	1.91 m (6 ft 3 in)	70 kg (150 lb)	338 cm (133 in)	314 cm (124 in)	(Puerto Rico) National Team
7	Arturo Iglesias	November 22, 1995	1.97 m (6 ft 6 in)	88 kg (194 lb)	246 cm (97 in)	243 cm (96 in)	(Puerto Rico) National Team
8	Kevin Lopez	April 24, 1995	1.98 m (6 ft 6 in)	81 kg (179 lb)	245 cm (96 in)	238 cm (94 in)	(Puerto Rico) National Team
9	Pedro Molina	April 7, 1999	1.92 m (6 ft 4 in)	81 kg (179 lb)	246 cm (97 in)	239 cm (94 in)	(Puerto Rico) National Team
12	Arnel Cabrera	October 11, 1994	1.89 m (6 ft 2 in)	79 kg (174 lb)	245 cm (96 in)	239 cm (94 in)	(Puerto Rico) National Team
13	Roque Nido	December 8, 1999	1.86 m (6 ft 1 in)	83 kg (183 lb)	248 cm (98 in)	242 cm (95 in)	(Puerto Rico) National Team
14	Pelegrín Vargas	July 31, 1998	1.93 m (6 ft 4 in)	87 kg (192 lb)	242 cm (95 in)	236 cm (93 in)	(Puerto Rico) National Team
15	Jonathan Rodríguez	September 16, 1997	1.93 m (6 ft 4 in)	82 kg (181 lb)	238 cm (94 in)	238 cm (94 in)	(Puerto Rico) National Team
17	Ismael Alomar	June 28, 1996	1.89 m (6 ft 2 in)	82 kg (181 lb)	267 cm (105 in)	262 cm (103 in)	(Puerto Rico) National Team
18	Antonio Elias	September 15, 2000	1.93 m (6 ft 4 in)	81 kg (179 lb)	256 cm (101 in)	252 cm (99 in)	(Puerto Rico) National Team
