= Darlan Souza =

Brazilian volleyball player (born 2002)

Personal information
- Full name: Darlan Ferreira Souza
- Born: 24 June 2002 (age 24) Rio de Janeiro, Brazil
- Height: 1.92 m (6 ft 4 in)

Volleyball information
- Position: Opposite
- Number: 28 (national team)

National team
- Years: Team
- 2022–present: Brazil
Honours
Men's volleyball
Representing Brazil
World Championship
Bronze medal – third place	2022 Poland/Slovenia	Team
FIVB Nations League
Bronze medal – third place	2025 Ningbo
Pan American Games
Gold medal – first place	2023 Santiago	Team

Darlan Ferreira Souza (Note: This name uses Portuguese naming customs: the first or maternal family name is Ferreira and the second or paternal family name is Souza.) (born 24 June 2002) is a Brazilian volleyball player who plays for the Brazilian men's national volleyball team. He represented Brazil at the 2022 FIVB World Championship, where he won a bronze medal. He has emerged as a top playmaker and leader of the Brazilian team.

== Clubs ==
Years	Club
2017–2018	(Brazil) Fluminense FC
2018–	(Brazil) Sesi-Bauru
