= Time in the Dominican Republic =

Time in Dominican Republic
- Time zone: Atlantic Standard Time
- Initials: AST
- UTC offset: UTC−4

Daylight saving time
- DST not observed

tz database
- America/Santo_Domingo

The Dominican Republic observes Atlantic Standard Time (UTC−4) year-round. Daylight saving time was used in the past.

== History ==
At midday April 1, 1933, Rafael Trujillo ordered a decree that established a national time zone for the Dominican Republic, which was set to five hours behind Greenwich Mean Time (GMT). Prior to that, time in the Dominican Republic was governed by Santo Domingo Mean Time, which was 4 hours and 40 minutes behind GMT.

On October 27, 1974, the Dominican Republic moved from Eastern Standard Time to Atlantic Standard Time.

On October 29, 2000, under Hipólito Mejía, the Dominican Republic moved to Eastern Standard Time, but on December 3 that same year, due to sustained confusion from the public, the Dominican Republic returned to Atlantic Standard Time.

== IANA time zone database ==
In the IANA time zone database, Dominican Republic is given one zone in the file zone.tab—America/Santo_Domingo. "DO" refers to the country's ISO 3166-1 alpha-2 country code. Data for Dominican Republic directly from zone.tab of the IANA time zone database; columns marked with * are the columns from zone.tab itself:

c.c.*	coordinates*	TZ*	Comments	UTC offset	DST
DO	+1828−06954	America/Santo_Domingo		−04:00	−04:00
