= 2007 Men's NORCECA Volleyball Championship =

2023 Men's NORCECA Championship

Tournament details
- Host country: United States
- City: Anaheim
- Dates: 16–21 September 2007
- Teams: 8
- Venue: 1 (in 1 host city)

Final positions
- Champions: United States (7th title)
- Runners-up: Puerto Rico
- Third place: Cuba
- Fourth place: Canada

Tournament awards
- MVP: (United States) Lloy Ball
- Best Setter: (United States) Lloy Ball
- Best OH: (Puerto Rico) Victor Rivera
- Best MB: (Canada) Murray Grapentine
- Best Libero: (Dominican Republic) Amaury Martínez

Tournament statistics
- Matches played: 21
- Attendance: 16,700 (795 per match)
- Best scorer: (Puerto Rico) Héctor Soto
- Best server: (United States) Clay Stanley
- Best digger: (Canada) Chris Wolfenden
- Best receiver: (Dominican Republic) Elvis Contreras

The 2007 Men's NORCECA Volleyball Championship was the 20th edition of the Men's Continental Volleyball Tournament, played by eight countries from September 16 to September 21, 2007, in the Anaheim Convention Center in Anaheim, United States.

== Competing nations ==
| Group A | Group B |
|---|---|
| Barbados; Mexico; Puerto Rico; United States | Canada; Cuba; Dominican Republic; Trinidad and Tobago |

== Preliminary round ==
=== Group A ===
| | Team | Points | G | W | L | PW | PL | Ratio | SW | SL | Ratio |
|---|---|---|---|---|---|---|---|---|---|---|---|
| 1. | United States | 6 | 3 | 3 | 0 | 227 | 164 | 1.384 | 9 | 0 | MAX |
| 2. | Puerto Rico | 5 | 3 | 2 | 1 | 212 | 153 | 1.385 | 6 | 3 | 2.000 |
| 3. | Mexico | 4 | 3 | 1 | 2 | 192 | 229 | 0.838 | 3 | 7 | 0.428 |
| 4. | Barbados | 3 | 3 | 0 | 3 | 158 | 243 | 0.650 | 1 | 9 | 0.111 |

- Sunday September 16

| Puerto Rico | 3 – 0 | Barbados | 25-16 25-17 25–16 |
| United States | 3 – 0 | Mexico | 25-11 25-15 25–20 |

- Monday September 17

| Puerto Rico | 3 – 0 | Mexico | 25-15 25-18 25–20 |
| United States | 3 – 0 | Barbados | 25-13 25-13 25–04 |

- Tuesday September 18

| Mexico | 3 – 1 | Barbados | 25-14 25-18 18-25 25–22 |
| United States | 3 – 0 | Puerto Rico | 25-19 27-25 25–18 |

=== Group B ===
| | Team | Points | G | W | L | PW | PL | Ratio | SW | SL | Ratio |
|---|---|---|---|---|---|---|---|---|---|---|---|
| 1. | Cuba | 6 | 3 | 3 | 0 | 247 | 190 | 1.300 | 9 | 1 | 9.000 |
| 2. | Canada | 5 | 3 | 2 | 1 | 238 | 192 | 1.239 | 7 | 3 | 2.333 |
| 3. | Dominican R. | 4 | 3 | 1 | 2 | 186 | 201 | 0.925 | 3 | 6 | 0.500 |
| 4. | Trinidad & T. | 3 | 3 | 0 | 3 | 137 | 225 | 0.608 | 0 | 9 | 0.000 |

- Sunday September 16

| Cuba | 3 – 0 | Trinidad & T. | 25-13 25-16 25–19 |
| Canada | 3 – 0 | Dominican R. | 25-21 25-23 25–20 |

- Monday September 17

| Canada | 3 – 0 | Trinidad & T. | 25-14 25-14 25–10 |
| Cuba | 3 – 0 | Dominican R. | 25-13 25-17 25–17 |

- Tuesday September 18

| Dominican R. | 3 – 0 | Trinidad & T. | 25-15 25-20 25–16 |
| Cuba | 3 – 1 | Canada | 25-22 22-25 25-23 25–18 |

== Final round ==
Semi-finals
2007-09-20 – Anaheim, California
Puerto Rico | 3
Cuba | 2
2007-09-20 – Anaheim, California
United States | 3
Canada | 1

Final
2007-09-21 – Anaheim, California
Puerto Rico | 1
United States | 3
3rd place
2007-09-21 – Anaheim, California
Cuba | 3
Canada | 0

=== Quarter-finals ===
- Wednesday 2007-09-19

| Puerto Rico | 3 – 0 | Dominican R. | 25-18 25-19 25–15 |
| Canada | 3 – 0 | Mexico | 25-19 25-17 25–21 |

=== Semi-finals ===
- Thursday 2007-09-20 — 5th/8th place

| Dominican R. | 3 – 1 | Trinidad & T. | 21-25 25-14 25-21 25–19 |
| Mexico | 2 – 3 | Barbados | 25-23 22-25 19-25 25-18 15–17 |

- Thursday 2007-09-20 — 1st/4th place

| Puerto Rico | 3 – 2 | Cuba | 26-24 11-25 22-25 26-24 15–11 |
| United States | 3 – 1 | Canada | 32-30 19-25 25-19 26–24 |

=== Finals ===
- Friday 2007-09-21 — Seventh Place Match

| Trinidad & T. | 0 – 3 | Mexico | 22-25 16-25 25–27 |

- Friday 2007-09-21 — Fifth Place Match

| Dominican R. | 3 – 0 | Barbados | 25-13 25-18 25–16 |

- Friday 2007-09-21 — Bronze Medal Match

| Cuba | 3 – 0 | Canada | 38-36 25-21 25–22 |

- Friday 2007-09-21 — Gold Medal Match

| Puerto Rico | 1 – 3 | United States | 20-25 25-23 22-25 23–25 |

== Final ranking ==
| Place | Team |
|---|---|
| 1. | United States |
| 2. | Puerto Rico |
| 3. | Cuba |
| 4. | Canada |
| 5. | Dominican Republic |
| 6. | Barbados |
| 7. | Mexico |
| 8. | Trinidad and Tobago |

2007 Men's NORCECA winners

United States
Seventh title

  - USA and Puerto Rico qualified for the 2007 FIVB Men's World Cup

== Awards ==
- Most valuable player
  - (United States) Lloy Ball
- Best scorer
  - (Puerto Rico) Héctor Soto
- Best spiker
  - (Puerto Rico) Victor Rivera
- Best blocker
  - (Canada) Murray Grapentine
- Best server
  - (United States) Clay Stanley
- Best digger
  - (Canada) Chris Wolfenden
- Best setter
  - (United States) Lloy Ball
- Best receiver
  - (Dominican Republic) Elvis Contreras
- Best libero
  - (Dominican Republic) Amaury Martínez
- Best Coach ("Jim E. Coleman Award")
  - (United States) Hugh McCutcheon
