= José Martell =

Mexican volleyball player (born 1976)

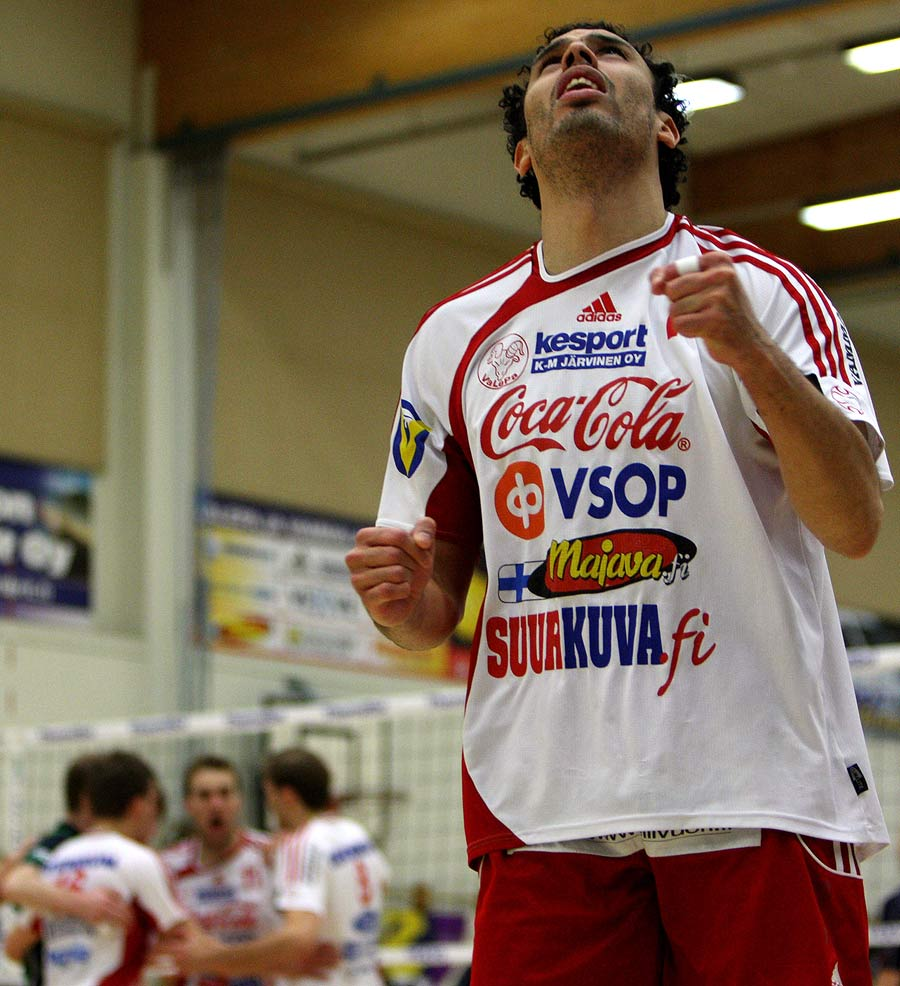
- Jose Luis Martell in Finland league game season 2008

Personal information
- Full name: José Luis Martell Macias
- Nationality: Mexican
- Born: 21 October 1976 (age 50)
- Hometown: Mexico City
- Height: 195 m (639 ft 9 in)
- Weight: 85 kg (187 lb)
- Spike: 350 cm (138 in)
- Block: 340 cm (134 in)

Volleyball information
- Number: 12

Career
Years	Teams
2012	IMSS VALLE DE MEXICO

National team
2010	Mexico

José Luis Martell (born 21 October 1976) is a retired Mexican male volleyball player. He was part of the Mexico men's national volleyball team at the 2010 FIVB Volleyball Men's World Championship in Italy. He played for IMSS VALLE DE MEXICO until 2012 where he then retired.

== Clubs ==
- IMSS Valle De Mexico (2010-2012)
- VaLePa Sastamala Tampere (2008-2009)
- Pamesa Teruel Voleibol (2006-2007)
- Arona Tenerife Sur (2002-2006)
