= Trinidad and Tobago men's national volleyball team =

National sports team

Trinidad and Tobago
- Association: Trinidad & Tobago Volleyball Federation
- Confederation: NORCECA
- Head coach: Sean Morrison

Uniforms
Home	Away
- www.ttvf.org

The Trinidad and Tobago men's national volleyball team represents Trinidad and Tobago in international volleyball competitions and friendly matches.

== Results ==
=== Pan-American Cup ===
- 2006 — 6th place
- 2007 — 6th place
- 2008 — 6th place
- 2012 — 8th place

=== NORCECA Championship ===
- 1985 — 9th place
- 2007 — 8th place
- 2011 — 6th place

== Squad 2008 ==
- Head Coach: Augusto Sabbatini

#	Name	Date of Birth	Height	Weight	Spike	Block
1	Jessel Davis
2	Kevin Nimrod
4	Nolan Tash
6	Vaughn Martin
7	Mark Daly (captain)
8	Saleem Ali
9	Christian Francois
10	Kevin Alleyne
11	Sean Morrison
14	Marc-Anthony Honoré
16	Russel Peña
17	Hollis Charles

== See also ==
- Trinidad and Tobago women's national volleyball team
