= Dominican Republic men's national volleyball team =

National sports team

Dominican Republic
- Association: Federación Dominicana de Voleibol
- Confederation: NORCECA
- Head coach: Jacinto Campechano
- FIVB ranking: 46 (3 August 2026)

Uniforms
Home	Away

World Championship
- Appearances: 2 (First in 1974)
- Best result: 22nd (1974)

NORCECA Championship
- Appearances: 17 (First in 1973)
- Best result: (silver) (2017)
- www.fedovoli.org (in Spanish)
Honours
NORCECA Championship
Silver medal – second place	2017 Colorado Springs	Team
Pan-American Cup
Silver medal – second place	2006 Mexicali	Team
Bronze medal – third place	2008 Winnipeg	Team
Bronze medal – third place	2009 Chiapas	Team
Bronze medal – third place	2012 Santo Domingo	Team
Central American and Caribbean Games
Silver medal – second place	1962 Kingston	Team
Silver medal – second place	1986 Santiago	Team
Bronze medal – third place	1974 Santo Domingo	Team

The Dominican Republic men's national volleyball team represents the Dominican Republic in international volleyball competitions. In the 1950s the squad twice ended up in fourth place at the Pan American Games (1955 and 1959). The dominant forces in men's volleyball in North and Central America are Cuba and the United States.

== Results ==
=== World Championship ===
- (Mexico) 1974 – 22nd place
- (Italy) (Bulgaria) 2018 – 24th place

=== Challenger Cup ===
- (Qatar) 2023 – 6th place

=== NORCECA Championship ===
- 1969 – Did not enter
- 1971 – Did not enter
- 1973 – 6th place
- 1975 – Did not enter
- 1977 – 7th place
- 1979 – 4th place
- 1981 – 6th place
- 1983 – Did not enter
- 1985 – 4th place
- 1987 – 4th place
- 1989 – 6th place
- 1991 – 5th place
- 1993 – Did not enter
- 1995 – 6th place
- 1997 – 7th place
- 1999 – Did not enter
- 2001 – 4th place
- 2003 – Did not enter
- 2005 – 4th place
- 2007 – 5th place
- 2009 – 6th place
- 2011 – Did not enter
- 2013 – 6th place
- 2015 – Did not enter
- 2017 – (silver) Silver medal
- 2019 – 6th place
- 2021 – 6th place
- 2023 – 4th place
- 2026 – 4th place

=== Pan-American Cup ===
- 2006 – (silver) Silver medal
- 2007 – 5th place
- 2008 – (bronze) Bronze medal
- 2009 – (bronze) Bronze medal
- 2010 – 6th place
- 2011 – 8th place
- 2012 – (bronze) Bronze medal
- 2013 – 6th place
- 2014 – 8th place
- 2015 – 8th place
- 2016 – 6th place
- 2017 – 6th place
- 2018 – 10th place
- 2019 – 9th place
- 2021 – 4th place
- 2022 – 7th place

=== America Cup ===
- 2007 – 6th place

== Squads ==
=== 2007 NORCECA Championship ===
- Head Coach: Jacinto Campechano

#	Name	Date of Birth	Weight	Height	Spike	Block
3	Elvis Contreras (c)	16.05.1984	75	185	345	320
4	José Castro	12.01.1981	82	188	336	326
5	Hilariun Monción	21.10.1979	70	182	314	290
6	Juan Tejada	29.08.1981	96	187	320	308
7	Eduardo Concepción	01.11.1983	90	196	330	320
8	Jorge Luis Galva	24.09.1988	97	196	335	321
9	Amaury Martínez	13.02.1973	90	192	325	320
11	José Miguel Cáceres	24.12.1981	96	210	361	340
12	Franklin González	27.07.1985	70	185	318	272
13	Juan Eury Almonte	19.08.1978	96	196	350	330
14	Yhonastan Fabian	18.03.1984	80	180	315	290
16	Víctor Batista	02.10.1979	90	199	350	340
