= Mexico men's national volleyball team =

National volleyball team

Mexico
- Association: Federación Mexicana de Voleibol (FMVB)
- Confederation: NORCECA
- Head coach: Jorge Azair
- FIVB ranking: 24 ▲13 (1 October 2026)

Uniforms
Home	Away

Summer Olympics
- Appearances: 2 (First in 1968)
- Best result: 10th (1968)

World Championship
- Appearances: 6 (First in 1974)
- Best result: 10th (1974)

World Cup
- Appearances: 2 (First in 1977)
- Best result: 9th (1977)

NORCECA Championship
- Appearances: 20 (First in 1969)
- Best result: (silver) (1969, 1975, 1977)
- fmvb.org

Mexico men's national volleyball team
Medal record

Pan American Games
Silver medal – second place	1955 Mexico City	Team
Bronze medal – third place	1959 Chicago	Team
Bronze medal – third place	1975 Mexico City	Team

NORCECA Championship
Silver medal – second place	1969 Mexico City	
Silver medal – second place	1975 Los Angeles	
Silver medal – second place	1977 Santo Domingo	
Bronze medal – third place	1971 Havana	
Bronze medal – third place	1979 Havana	
Bronze medal – third place	2021 Durango City	

Pan-American Cup
Gold medal – first place	2007 Santo Domingo	
Gold medal – first place	2021 Santo Domingo	
Silver medal – second place	2013 Mexico City	
Bronze medal – third place	2019 Colima City	

The Mexico men's national volleyball team represents Mexico in international volleyball competitions. In the 1950s the squad twice won a medal (silver and bronze) at the Pan American Games. The dominant forces in men's volleyball in North and Central America are Cuba and the United States.

== Results ==
=== Olympic Games ===
- 1968 – 10th place
- 2016 – 11th place

=== World Championship ===
- 1974 – 10th place
- 1978 – 12th place
- 1982 – 18th place
- 2010 – 13th place
- 2014 – 17th place
- 2022 – 18th place

=== Challenger Cup ===
- 2024 – 8th place

=== World League ===
- 2014 – 25th place
- 2015 – 30th place
- 2016 – 34th place
- 2017 – 28th place

=== NORCECA Championship ===
- 1969 – Silver medal
- 1971 – Bronze medal
- 1975 – Silver medal
- 1977 – Silver medal
- 1979 – Bronze medal
- 2001 – 6th place
- 2003 – 4th place
- 2005 – 6th place
- 2007 – 7th place
- 2011 – 5th place
- 2013 – 5th place
- 2015 – 4th place
- 2017 – 4th place
- 2019 – 4th place
- 2021 – Bronze medal
- 2023 – 5th place
- 2026 – 5th place

=== Pan American Games ===
- 1955 – 3rd place
- 1959 – 3rd place
- 1963 – did not compete
- 1967 – 4th place
- 1971 – 5th place
- 1975 – 3rd place
- 1979 – 4th place
- 1983 – did not compete
- 1987 – did not compete
- 1991 – did not compete
- 1995 – did not compete
- 1999 – did not compete
- 2003 – did not compete
- 2007 – 8th place
- 2011 – 4th place
- 2015 – 7th place
- 2019 – 7th place

=== Pan-American Cup ===
- 2006 – 4th place
- 2007 – (gold) Gold medal
- 2008 – 4th place
- 2009 – 5th place
- 2010 – 7th place
- 2011 – 5th place
- 2012 – 5th place
- 2013 – (silver) Silver medal
- 2014 – 6th place
- 2015 – 5th place
- 2016 – 4th place
- 2017 – 8th place
- 2018 – 5th place
- 2019 – (bronze) Bronze medal
- 2021 – (gold) Gold medal
- 2022 – 6th place

== Current squad ==
The following is the Mexican roster in the 2022 World Championship.

Head coach: (Mexico) Jorge Azair

No.	Name	Date of birth	Height	Weight	Spike	Block	2022–23 club
1	José Mendoza Perdomo	31 May 1993	1.70 m (5 ft 7 in)	71 kg (157 lb)	290 cm (110 in)	265 cm (104 in)	(Mexico) Tapatíos de Jalisco
3	Hiram Bravo Moreno	19 December 1999	1.73 m (5 ft 8 in)	75 kg (165 lb)	234 cm (92 in)	226 cm (89 in)	(Mexico) Tigres UANL
4	Raynel Ferrán Romero	31 October 2001	1.90 m (6 ft 3 in)	95 kg (209 lb)	330 cm (130 in)	315 cm (124 in)	(Mexico) Nuevo Leon
6	Josué López Ríos	21 July 2002	1.97 m (6 ft 6 in)	91 kg (201 lb)	360 cm (140 in)	330 cm (130 in)	(Portugal) Sporting CP
7	Diego González Castañeda	15 February 2000	2.01 m (6 ft 7 in)	85 kg (187 lb)	365 cm (144 in)	350 cm (140 in)	(Mexico) Tigres UANL
8	Edgar Mendoza Burgueño	8 January 1999	1.97 m (6 ft 6 in)	94 kg (207 lb)	338 cm (133 in)	326 cm (128 in)	(Mexico) Nayarit
9	Axel Téllez Rodríguez	8 October 1999	2.03 m (6 ft 8 in)	99 kg (218 lb)	350 cm (140 in)	345 cm (136 in)	(Spain) Pamesa Voleibol Teruel
12	Mauro Fuentes Rascón	13 October 1997	1.85 m (6 ft 1 in)	92 kg (203 lb)	300 cm (120 in)	290 cm (110 in)	(Spain) FC Barcelona Voleibol
14	Jonathan Martínez García	30 September 1991	1.97 m (6 ft 6 in)	100 kg (220 lb)	342 cm (135 in)	320 cm (130 in)	(Mexico) UACH
15	Christian Aranda (C)	9 April 1997	1.90 m (6 ft 3 in)	65 kg (143 lb)	322 cm (127 in)	288 cm (113 in)	(Portugal) Vitória S.C.
16	Miguel Chávez	31 March 1997	2.02 m (6 ft 8 in)	73 kg (161 lb)	335 cm (132 in)	293 cm (115 in)	(Mexico) Universidad de Sonora
18	Yasutaka Sanay Heredia	2 May 2001	1.86 m (6 ft 1 in)	85 kg (187 lb)	345 cm (136 in)	315 cm (124 in)	(Mexico) Baja California
20	Luis Hernández Baca	4 January 2001	2.00 m (6 ft 7 in)	92 kg (203 lb)	357 cm (141 in)	327 cm (129 in)	(Mexico) Tapatíos de Jalisco
21	Brandon López Ríos	30 August 1996	1.97 m (6 ft 6 in)	101 kg (223 lb)	350 cm (140 in)	325 cm (128 in)	(Mexico) Nuevo Leon
