= 2012 FIVB Volleyball World League squads =

Below there are the squads from the participating teams of the 2012 FIVB Volleyball World League.

- C indicates the Captain of the team.
- L indicates the Libero of the team.

== Argentina ==
#NR	NAME	BIRTHDATE
1	Gabriel Arroyo	3 March 1977 (age 49)
2	Ivan Castellani	19 January 1991 (age 35)
3	Martín Blanco Costa	16 December 1985 (age 40)
4	Lucas Ocampo	20 March 1986 (age 39)
5	Nicolás Uriarte	21 March 1990 (age 35)
6	Cristian Poglajen	14 July 1989 (age 36)
7	Facundo Conte	25 August 1989 (age 36)
8	Mariano Giustiniano	4 April 1986 (age 39)
9	Rodrigo Quiroga (C)	23 March 1987 (age 38)
10	Nicolas Bruno	24 February 1989 (age 37)
11	Sebastián Sole	12 June 1991 (age 34)
12	Federico Pereyra	19 June 1988 (age 37)
13	Federico Martina	2 November 1992 (age 33)
14	Pablo Crer	12 June 1989 (age 36)
15	Luciano De Cecco	2 June 1988 (age 37)
16	Alexis González (L)	21 July 1981 (age 44)
17	Mariano Cavanna	2 July 1988 (age 37)
18	Franco López (L)	4 February 1989 (age 37)
19	Maximiliano Gauna	29 April 1989 (age 36)
20	Guillermo García	21 September 1983 (age 42)
21	Pablo Bengolea	8 May 1986 (age 39)
22	Facundo Santucci	6 March 1987 (age 39)
23	Guido Romanutti	19 September 1987 (age 38)
24	Demián González	21 February 1983 (age 43)
25	Gustavo Scholtis	16 December 1982 (age 43)
Coach	Javier Weber	6 January 1966 (age 60)

== Brazil ==
#NR	NAME	BIRTHDATE
1	Bruno Rezende (C)	2 July 1986 (age 39)
2	William Arjona	31 July 1979 (age 46)
3	Éder Carbonera	19 October 1983 (age 42)
4	Wallace de Souza	26 June 1987 (age 38)
5	Sidnei dos Santos	9 July 1982 (age 43)
6	Leandro Vissotto Neves	30 April 1983 (age 42)
7	Gilberto Godoy Filho	23 December 1976 (age 49)
8	Murilo Endres	3 May 1981 (age 44)
9	Théo Lopes	31 August 1983 (age 42)
10	Sérgio Dutra Santos (L)	15 October 1975 (age 50)
11	Thiago Soares Alves	26 July 1986 (age 39)
12	Marlon Yared	27 July 1977 (age 48)
13	Gustavo Endres	23 August 1975 (age 50)
14	Rodrigo Santana	17 April 1979 (age 46)
15	João Paulo Bravo	7 January 1979 (age 47)
16	Lucas Saatkamp	6 March 1986 (age 40)
17	Ricardo Garcia	19 November 1975 (age 50)
18	Dante Amaral	30 September 1980 (age 45)
19	Mário Pedreira Júnior (L)	3 May 1982 (age 43)
20	Raphael Vieira de Oliveira	14 June 1979 (age 46)
21	Fabrício Dias	12 January 1979 (age 47)
22	Ricardo Lucarelli	14 February 1992 (age 34)
23	Henrique Randow	5 April 1978 (age 47)
24	Renan Buiatti	10 January 1990 (age 36)
25	Maurício Silva	4 February 1989 (age 37)
Coach	Bernardo Rezende	28 March 1959 (age 66)

== Bulgaria ==
#NR	NAME	BIRTHDATE
1	Georgi Bratoev	21 October 1987 (age 38)
2	Hristo Tsvetanov	29 March 1978 (age 47)
3	Andrey Zhekov	12 March 1980 (age 45)
4	Vladislav Ivanov (L)	14 March 1987 (age 38)
5	Svetoslav Gotsev	31 August 1990 (age 35)
6	Matey Kaziyski	23 September 1984 (age 41)
7	Martin Bozhilov (L)	11 April 1988 (age 37)
8	Boyan Yordanov	12 March 1983 (age 42)
9	Dobromir Dimitrov	7 July 1991 (age 34)
10	Valentin Bratoev	21 October 1987 (age 38)
11	Vladimir Nikolov (C)	3 October 1977 (age 48)
12	Viktor Yosifov	16 October 1985 (age 40)
13	Teodor Salparov (L)	16 August 1982 (age 43)
14	Teodor Todorov	1 September 1989 (age 36)
15	Todor Aleksiev	21 April 1983 (age 42)
16	Kostadin Gadzhanov	18 March 1986 (age 39)
17	Nikolay Penchev	22 May 1992 (age 33)
18	Nikolay Nikolov	29 July 1986 (age 39)
19	Tsvetan Sokolov	31 December 1989 (age 36)
20	Danail Milushev	3 February 1984 (age 42)
21	Todor Skrimov	9 January 1990 (age 36)
22	Teodor Bogdanov	29 January 1986 (age 40)
23	Borislav Georgiev	12 May 1992 (age 33)
24	Metodi Ananiev	17 February 1986 (age 40)
25	Simeon Aleksandrov	18 February 1988 (age 38)
Coach	Radostin Stoychev	25 September 1969 (age 56)

== Canada ==
#NR	NAME	BIRTHDATE
1	Louis-Pierre Mainville	3 April 1986 (age 39)
2	Nicholas Cundy	14 September 1983 (age 42)
3	Daniel Lewis (L)	3 April 1976 (age 49)
4	Joshua Howatson	7 October 1984 (age 41)
5	Brock Davidiuk	24 April 1983 (age 42)
6	Justin Duff	10 May 1988 (age 37)
7	Dallas Soonias	25 April 1984 (age 41)
8	Adam Simac	9 August 1983 (age 42)
9	Dustin Schneider	27 February 1985 (age 41)
10	Toontje Van Lankvelt	1 July 1984 (age 41)
11	Steve Brinkman	12 January 1978 (age 48)
12	Gavin Schmitt	27 January 1986 (age 40)
13	Olivier Faucher	14 September 1984 (age 41)
14	Adam Kaminski	27 May 1984 (age 41)
15	Frederic Winters (C)	21 April 1983 (age 42)
16	Stephen Gotch	18 October 1985 (age 40)
17	Alexandre Gaumont Casias	26 November 1984 (age 41)
18	John Gordon Perrin	17 August 1989 (age 36)
19	Blair Bann (L)	26 February 1988 (age 38)
20	Ciaran McGovern	5 June 1989 (age 36)
21	Spencer Leiske	3 May 1988 (age 37)
22	Max Burt	25 July 1988 (age 37)
23	Jacob Kilpatrick	17 December 1988 (age 37)
24	Sander Ratsep	24 April 1988 (age 37)
25	Graham Vigrass	17 June 1989 (age 36)
Coach	Glenn Hoag

== Cuba ==
#NR	NAME	BIRTHDATE
1	Wilfredo León Venero (C)	31 July 1993 (age 32)
2	Lian Sem Estrada Jova	12 December 1982 (age 43)
3	Gustavo Leyva Álvarez (L)	14 December 1985 (age 40)
4	Yassel Perdomo Naranjo	23 March 1993 (age 32)
5	Leandro Macías Infante	13 February 1990 (age 36)
6	Keibir Gutiérrez Torna (L)	6 May 1987 (age 38)
7	Osmany Roberto Camejo Durruthy	18 February 1983 (age 43)
8	Rolando Cepeda Abreu	13 March 1989 (age 36)
9	Yonder Roman Garcia Alvarez (L)	26 February 1993 (age 33)
10	Danger Jorber Quintana Guerra	19 May 1994 (age 31)
11	Lazaro Raydel Fundora Travieso	13 February 1994 (age 32)
12	Henry Bell Cisnero	27 July 1982 (age 43)
13	David Fiel Rodriguez	28 August 1993 (age 32)
14	Yordan Bisset Astengo	21 October 1994 (age 31)
15	Dariel Albo Miranda	11 February 1992 (age 34)
16	Isbel Mesa Sandobal	2 June 1989 (age 36)
17	Osmani Uriarte Mestre	4 June 1995 (age 30)
18	Yoandri Díaz	4 January 1985 (age 41)
19	Fernando Hernández Ramos	11 September 1989 (age 36)
20	Inover Romero Valdes	14 January 1995 (age 31)
21	Raydel Hierrezuelo	14 July 1987 (age 38)
22	Denny de Jesus Hernandez Martinez	24 February 1994 (age 32)
23	Livan Osoria Rodriguez	5 February 1994 (age 32)
24	Nelson Loyola Lavin	7 May 1993 (age 32)
25	Alfonso Alexis Lamadrid	3 February 1993 (age 33)
Coach	Samuels Blackwood	31 December 1946 (age 79)

== Finland ==
#NR	NAME	BIRTHDATE
1	Sauli Sinkkonen	14 September 1989 (age 36)
2	Eemi Tervaportti	26 July 1989 (age 36)
3	Mikko Esko	3 September 1978 (age 47)
4	Tommi Roininen (L)	1 February 1984 (age 42)
5	Antti Siltala	14 March 1984 (age 41)
6	Tuomas Sammelvuo (C)	16 February 1976 (age 50)
7	Matti Hietanen	3 January 1983 (age 43)
8	Jari Tuominen	11 September 1986 (age 39)
9	Jouni Palokangas	23 November 1986 (age 39)
10	Urpo Sivula	15 March 1988 (age 37)
11	Jesse Mäntylä (L)	24 March 1987 (age 38)
12	Olli Kunnari	2 February 1982 (age 44)
13	Mikko Oivanen	26 May 1986 (age 39)
14	Konstantin Shumov	15 February 1985 (age 41)
15	Matti Oivanen	26 May 1986 (age 39)
16	Olli-Pekka Ojansivu	31 December 1987 (age 38)
17	Toni Kankaanpää	18 March 1984 (age 41)
18	Jukka Lehtonen	22 February 1982 (age 44)
19	Pasi Hyvärinen (L)	22 November 1987 (age 38)
20	Lauri Kerminen (L)	18 January 1993 (age 33)
21	Tommi Siirilä	5 August 1993 (age 32)
22	Petteri Penttinen	21 August 1985 (age 40)
23	Antti Esko	30 July 1982 (age 43)
24	Elviss Krastins	15 September 1994 (age 31)
25	Aleksi Kaatrasalo	24 May 1990 (age 35)
Coach	Daniel Castellani	21 March 1961 (age 64)

== France ==
#NR	NAME	BIRTHDATE
1	José Trèfle	16 January 1980 (age 46)
2	Jenia Grebennikov	13 August 1990 (age 35)
3	Gérald Hardy-Dessources (L)	9 February 1983 (age 43)
4	Antonin Rouzier	18 August 1986 (age 39)
5	Romain Vadeleux	12 February 1983 (age 43)
6	Benjamin Toniutti	30 October 1989 (age 36)
7	Nicolas Marechal	4 March 1987 (age 39)
8	Marien Moreau	25 October 1983 (age 42)
9	Guillaume Samica	28 September 1981 (age 44)
10	Jean-Philippe Sol	1 January 1986 (age 40)
11	Julien Lyneel	15 April 1990 (age 35)
12	Earvin N'Gapeth	12 February 1991 (age 35)
13	Pierre Pujol (C)	13 July 1984 (age 41)
14	Toafa Takaniko	29 May 1985 (age 40)
15	Samuele Tuia	24 July 1986 (age 39)
16	Kevin Tillie	2 November 1990 (age 35)
17	Horacio d'Almeida	11 June 1988 (age 37)
18	Jean-François Exiga (L)	9 March 1982 (age 43)
19	Baptiste Geiler	12 March 1987 (age 38)
20	Kevin Le Roux	11 May 1989 (age 36)
21	Yannick Bazin	18 June 1983 (age 42)
22	Edouard Rowlandson	20 July 1988 (age 37)
23	Marc Zopie	31 May 1987 (age 38)
24	Ludovic Castard	18 January 1983 (age 43)
25	Xavier Kapfer	7 November 1981 (age 44)
Coach	Philippe Blain	20 May 1960 (age 65)

== Germany ==
#NR	NAME	BIRTHDATE
1	Marcus Popp	23 September 1981 (age 44)
2	Markus Steuerwald (L)	7 March 1989 (age 37)
3	Sebastian Schwarz	2 October 1985 (age 40)
4	Simon Tischer	24 April 1982 (age 43)
5	Björn Andrae (C)	14 May 1981 (age 44)
6	Denys Kaliberda	24 June 1990 (age 35)
7	Stefan Hübner	13 June 1975 (age 50)
8	Marcus Böhme	25 August 1985 (age 40)
9	György Grozer	27 November 1984 (age 41)
10	Jochen Schöps	8 October 1983 (age 42)
11	Lukas Kampa	29 November 1986 (age 39)
12	Ferdinand Tille (L)	8 December 1988 (age 37)
13	Christian Dünnes	16 June 1984 (age 41)
14	Robert Kromm	9 March 1984 (age 41)
15	Max Günthör	9 August 1985 (age 40)
16	Felix Fischer	27 February 1983 (age 43)
17	Patrick Steuerwald	3 March 1986 (age 40)
18	Lukas Bauer	26 February 1989 (age 37)
19	Sebastian Prüsener	26 May 1982 (age 43)
20	Ricardo Galandi	18 May 1989 (age 36)
21	Björn Höhne	27 March 1991 (age 34)
22	Philipp Jankowski	15 October 1991 (age 34)
23	Christian Fromm	15 August 1990 (age 35)
24	Sebastian Krause	16 October 1989 (age 36)
25	Simon Hirsch	3 April 1992 (age 33)
Coach	Raúl Lozano	3 September 1956 (age 69)

== Italy ==
#NR	NAME	BIRTHDATE
1	Luigi Mastrangelo	17 August 1975 (age 50)
2	Jiri Kovar	10 April 1989 (age 36)
3	Simone Parodi	16 June 1986 (age 39)
4	Andrea Bari (L)	5 March 1980 (age 46)
5	Giorgio De Togni	7 July 1985 (age 40)
6	Samuele Papi	20 May 1973 (age 52)
7	Michal Lasko	11 March 1981 (age 44)
8	Gabriele Maruotti	25 March 1988 (age 37)
9	Ivan Zaytsev	2 October 1988 (age 37)
10	Dante Boninfante	7 March 1977 (age 49)
11	Cristian Savani (C)	22 February 1982 (age 44)
12	Simone Buti	19 September 1983 (age 42)
13	Dragan Travica	28 August 1986 (age 39)
14	Alessandro Fei	29 November 1978 (age 47)
15	Emanuele Birarelli	8 February 1981 (age 45)
16	Michele Baranowicz	5 August 1989 (age 36)
17	Andrea Giovi (L)	19 August 1983 (age 42)
18	Giulio Sabbi	10 August 1989 (age 36)
19	Marco Falaschi	18 September 1987 (age 38)
20	Stefano Patriarca	23 July 1987 (age 38)
21	Enrico Cester	16 March 1988 (age 37)
22	Francesco De Marchi	17 June 1986 (age 39)
23	Filippo Lanza	3 March 1991 (age 35)
24	Salvatore Rossini	13 July 1986 (age 39)
25	Luca Vettori	26 April 1991 (age 34)
Coach	Mauro Berruto	8 May 1969 (age 56)

== Japan ==
#NR	NAME	BIRTHDATE
1	Daisuke Sakai	22 October 1981 (age 44)
2	Yuta Abe	8 August 1981 (age 44)
3	Takeshi Nagano (L)	11 July 1985 (age 40)
4	Yusuke Matsuta	31 October 1982 (age 43)
5	Daisuke Usami (C)	29 March 1979 (age 46)
6	Yoshifumi Suzuki	31 March 1983 (age 42)
7	Takahiro Yamamoto	12 July 1978 (age 47)
8	Yuya Ageba	30 September 1983 (age 42)
9	Takaaki Tomimatsu	20 July 1984 (age 41)
10	Osamu Tanabe (L)	10 April 1979 (age 46)
11	Yoshihiko Matsumoto	7 January 1981 (age 45)
12	Kota Yamamura	20 October 1980 (age 45)
13	Kunihiro Shimizu	11 August 1986 (age 39)
14	Tatsuya Fukuzawa	1 July 1986 (age 39)
15	Daisuke Yako	7 October 1988 (age 37)
16	Yusuke Ishijima	9 January 1984 (age 42)
17	Yu Koshikawa	30 June 1984 (age 41)
18	Yuta Yoneyama	29 August 1984 (age 41)
19	Akira Koshiya	12 June 1979 (age 46)
20	Ayumu Shinoda	14 December 1979 (age 46)
21	Shigeru Kondoh	23 November 1982 (age 43)
22	Naoya Suga	17 May 1985 (age 40)
23	Yuji Suzuki	7 June 1986 (age 39)
24	Yuhei Tsukazaki	11 July 1986 (age 39)
25	Dai Tezuka	18 November 1988 (age 37)
Coach	Tatsuya Ueta	25 July 1964 (age 61)

== Poland ==
#NR	NAME	BIRTHDATE
1	Piotr Nowakowski	18 December 1987 (age 38)
2	Michal Winiarski	28 September 1983 (age 42)
3	Wojciech Ferens	5 April 1991 (age 34)
4	Grzegorz Kosok	2 March 1986 (age 40)
5	Pawel Zagumny	18 October 1977 (age 48)
6	Bartosz Kurek	29 August 1988 (age 37)
7	Jakub Jarosz	10 February 1987 (age 39)
8	Bartosz Krzysiek	19 February 1990 (age 36)
9	Zbigniew Bartman	4 May 1987 (age 38)
10	Lukasz Wisniewski	3 February 1989 (age 37)
11	Fabian Drzyzga	3 January 1990 (age 36)
12	Paweł Woicki	19 June 1983 (age 42)
13	Michał Kubiak	18 July 1988 (age 37)
14	Michał Ruciak	22 August 1983 (age 42)
15	Łukasz Żygadło	2 August 1979 (age 46)
16	Krzysztof Ignaczak	15 May 1978 (age 47)
17	Paweł Zatorski	21 June 1990 (age 35)
18	Marcin Możdżonek (C)	9 February 1985 (age 41)
19	Grzegorz Lomacz	1 October 1987 (age 38)
20	Mateusz Mika	21 January 1991 (age 35)
21	Wojciech Zalinski	8 January 1988 (age 38)
22	Andrzej Wrona	27 December 1988 (age 37)
23	Karol Kłos	8 August 1989 (age 36)
24	Damian Wojtaszek	7 September 1988 (age 37)
25	Dawid Konarski	31 August 1988 (age 37)
Coach	Andrea Anastasi	10 August 1960 (age 65)

== Portugal ==
#NR	NAME	BIRTHDATE
1	Marcel Gil	8 May 1990 (age 35)
2	Carlos Teixeira	11 March 1976 (age 49)
3	Manuel Silva	28 December 1973 (age 52)
4	João Malveiro	8 December 1979 (age 46)
5	Marco Ferreira	4 October 1987 (age 38)
6	Alexandre Ferreira	13 November 1991 (age 34)
7	Ivo Casas	21 September 1992 (age 33)
8	Tiago Violas	27 March 1989 (age 36)
9	Nuno Pinheiro	31 December 1984 (age 41)
10	Filipe Pinto	26 February 1991 (age 35)
11	Carlos Fidalgo	16 May 1987 (age 38)
12	João José	7 June 1978 (age 47)
13	Valdir Sequeira	22 November 1981 (age 44)
14	Flávio Cruz	28 August 1982 (age 43)
15	Rui Santos	24 March 1984 (age 41)
16	Hugo Gaspar	2 September 1982 (age 43)
17	Miguel Rodrigues	2 November 1986 (age 39)
18	André Lopes (C)	12 September 1982 (age 43)
19	Rui Moreira	7 December 1985 (age 40)
20	Nuno Silva	3 February 1993 (age 33)
21	José Gomes	21 October 1994 (age 31)
22	Pedro Figueiredo	9 August 1986 (age 39)
23	Carlos Liborio	7 July 1990 (age 35)
24	João Coelho (L)	24 June 1981 (age 44)
25	Nuno Pereira	20 January 1989 (age 37)
Coach	Flavio Gulinelli

== Russia ==
#NR	NAME	BIRTHDATE
1	Alexander Abrosimov	August 25, 1983 (age 42)
2	Denis Biriukov	December 8, 1988 (age 37)
3	Nikolay Apalikov	August 26, 1982 (age 43)
4	Taras Khtey	May 22, 1982 (age 43)
5	Sergey Grankin	January 21, 1985 (age 41)
6	Evgeny Sivozhelez	August 6, 1986 (age 39)
7	Sergey Makarov	March 28, 1980 (age 45)
8	Sergey Tetyukhin	September 23, 1975 (age 50)
9	Aleksandr Sokolov	March 1, 1982 (age 44)
10	Yury Berezhko	January 27, 1984 (age 42)
11	Konstantin Ushakov	March 24, 1970 (age 55)
12	Alexander Butko	March 18, 1986 (age 39)
13	Dmitriy Muserskiy	October 29, 1988 (age 37)
14	Dmitry Shcherbinin	September 10, 1989 (age 36)
15	Dmitriy Ilinykh	January 31, 1987 (age 39)
16	Pavel Kruglov	September 17, 1985 (age 40)
17	Maxim Mikhaylov	March 19, 1988 (age 37)
18	Alexander Volkov	February 14, 1985 (age 41)
19	Alexey Rodichev	March 24, 1988 (age 37)
20	Alexey Obmochaev	May 22, 1989 (age 36)
21	Pavel Abramov	April 23, 1979 (age 46)
22	Alexey Kazakov	March 18, 1976 (age 49)
23	Alexey Verbov	January 31, 1982 (age 44)
24	Pavel Moroz	February 26, 1987 (age 39)
25	Igor Kobzar	April 13, 1991 (age 34)

== Serbia ==
#NR	NAME	BIRTHDATE
1	Nikola Kovacevic	February 14, 1983 (age 43)
2	Uros Kovacevic	May 6, 1993 (age 32)
3	Milos Vemic	March 8, 1987 (age 38)
4	Bojan Janic	March 11, 1982 (age 43)
5	Vlado Petkovic	January 6, 1983 (age 43)
6	Milos Terzic	June 13, 1987 (age 38)
7	Dragan Stankovic	October 18, 1985 (age 40)
8	Filip Vujic	October 17, 1989 (age 36)
9	Nikola Jovovic	February 13, 1992 (age 34)
10	Milos Nikic	March 31, 1986 (age 39)
11	Mihajlo Mitic	September 17, 1990 (age 35)
12	Milan Rasic	February 2, 1985 (age 41)
13	Tomislav Dokic	February 27, 1986 (age 40)
14	Aleksandar Atanasijevic	September 4, 1991 (age 34)
15	Sasa Starovic	October 19, 1988 (age 37)
16	Aleksa Brdjovic	July 29, 1993 (age 32)
17	Borislav Petrovic	January 6, 1988 (age 38)
18	Marko Podrascanin	August 29, 1987 (age 38)
19	Nikola Rosic	August 5, 1984 (age 41)
20	Srecko Lisinac	May 17, 1992 (age 33)
21	Nemanja Petric	July 28, 1987 (age 38)
22	Dejan Radic	November 6, 1984 (age 41)
23	Nikola Mijailovic	August 8, 1989 (age 36)
24	Marko Ivovic	December 22, 1990 (age 35)
25	Milija Mrdak	October 26, 1991 (age 34)

== South Korea ==
#NR	NAME	BIRTHDATE
1	Jeon Kwang-In	September 18, 1991 (age 34)
2	Han Sun-Soo	December 16, 1985 (age 40)
3	Kwon Young-Min	July 5, 1980 (age 45)
4	Moon Sung-Min	September 14, 1986 (age 39)
5	Yeo Oh-Hyun	September 2, 1978 (age 47)
6	Choi Tae-Woong	April 9, 1976 (age 49)
7	Lee Sun-Kyu	March 14, 1981 (age 44)
8	Kim Hak-Min	September 4, 1983 (age 42)
9	Kwak Seung-Suk	March 23, 1988 (age 37)
10	Yun Bong-Woo	January 20, 1982 (age 44)
11	Park Chul-Woo	July 25, 1985 (age 40)
12	Bu Yong-Chan	November 30, 1989 (age 36)
13	Choi Hong-Suk	June 26, 1988 (age 37)
14	Kim Yo-han	August 16, 1985 (age 40)
15	Ha Hyun-Yong	May 9, 1982 (age 43)
16	Kim Jeong-Hwan	March 23, 1988 (age 37)
17	Ha Kyoung-Min	July 27, 1982 (age 43)
18	Shin Yung-Suk	October 4, 1986 (age 39)
19	Lee Kang-Joo	June 30, 1983 (age 42)
20	Im Dong-Kyu	June 11, 1983 (age 42)
21	Song Myung-Geun	March 12, 1993 (age 32)
22	Lee Kyung-Soo	April 27, 1979 (age 46)
23	Jin Sang-Houn	April 22, 1986 (age 39)
24	Choi Min-Ho	April 28, 1988 (age 37)
25	Lee Kang-Won	May 5, 1990 (age 35)

== United States ==
#NR	NAME	BIRTHDATE
1	Matthew Anderson	April 18, 1987 (age 38)
2	Sean Rooney	November 13, 1982 (age 43)
3	Evan Patak	June 23, 1984 (age 41)
4	David Lee	March 8, 1982 (age 43)
5	Richard Lambourne	May 6, 1975 (age 50)
6	Paul Lotman	November 3, 1985 (age 40)
7	Donald Suxho	February 21, 1976 (age 50)
8	William Reid Priddy	October 1, 1977 (age 48)
9	Ryan Millar	January 22, 1978 (age 48)
10	Riley Salmon	July 2, 1976 (age 49)
11	Brian Thornton	April 22, 1985 (age 40)
12	Russell Holmes	July 1, 1982 (age 43)
13	Clayton Stanley	January 20, 1978 (age 48)
14	Kevin Hansen	March 19, 1982 (age 43)
15	Gabriel Gardner	March 18, 1976 (age 49)
16	Jayson Jablonsky	July 23, 1985 (age 40)
17	Maxwell Holt	March 12, 1987 (age 38)
18	Scott Touzinsky	April 22, 1982 (age 43)
19	Robert Tarr	January 9, 1984 (age 42)
20	David Smith	May 15, 1985 (age 40)
21	David Mckienzie	July 5, 1979 (age 46)
22	Taylor Sander	March 17, 1992 (age 33)
23	Jeffrey Menzel	October 31, 1988 (age 37)
24	Kawika Shoji	November 11, 1987 (age 38)
25	Jonathan Winder	January 4, 1986 (age 40)
