= 2011 FIVB Volleyball World League squads =

Below there are the squads from the participating teams of the 2011 FIVB Volleyball World League.

- C indicates the Captain of the team.
- L indicates the Libero of the team.

== Argentina ==
#NR	NAME	BIRTHDATE
1	Gabriel Arroyo	3 March 1977 (age 49)
2	Federico Martina	2 November 1992 (age 33)
3	Pablo Guzmán	6 April 1988 (age 37)
4	Lucas Ocampo	20 March 1986 (age 39)
5	Nicolás Uriarte	21 March 1990 (age 35)
6	Gustavo Scholtis	16 December 1982 (age 43)
7	Facundo Conte	25 August 1989 (age 36)
8	Demián González	21 February 1983 (age 43)
9	Rodrigo Quiroga (C)	23 March 1987 (age 38)
10	Diego Bonini	24 August 1978 (age 47)
11	Sebastián Sole	12 June 1991 (age 34)
12	Federico Pereyra	19 June 1988 (age 37)
13	Cristian Poglajen	14 July 1989 (age 36)
14	Pablo Crer	12 June 1989 (age 36)
15	Luciano De Cecco	2 June 1988 (age 37)
16	Alexis González (L)	21 July 1981 (age 44)
17	Mariano Giustiniano	4 April 1986 (age 39)
18	Franco López (L)	4 February 1989 (age 37)
19	Maximiliano Gauna	29 April 1989 (age 36)
20	Pablo Bengolea	8 May 1986 (age 39)
Coach	Javier Weber	6 January 1966 (age 60)

== Brazil ==
#NR	NAME	BIRTHDATE
1	Bruno Rezende	2 July 1986 (age 39)
2	Wallace Martins	22 March 1983 (age 42)
3	Eder Carbonera	19 October 1983 (age 42)
4	William Arjona	31 July 1979 (age 46)
5	Sidnei dos Santos	9 July 1982 (age 43)
6	Leandro Vissotto Neves	30 April 1983 (age 42)
7	Gilberto Godoy Filho (C)	23 December 1976 (age 49)
8	Murilo Endres	3 May 1981 (age 44)
9	Théo Lopes	31 August 1983 (age 42)
10	Sérgio Santos	15 October 1975 (age 50)
11	Thiago Soares Alves	26 July 1986 (age 39)
12	João Paulo Tavares	30 March 1983 (age 42)
13	Gustavo Endres	23 August 1975 (age 50)
14	Rodrigo Santana	17 April 1979 (age 46)
15	João Paulo Bravo	7 January 1979 (age 47)
16	Lucas Saatkamp	6 March 1986 (age 40)
17	Marlon Yared	27 July 1977 (age 48)
18	Dante Amaral	30 September 1980 (age 45)
19	Mário Pedreira Júnior	3 May 1982 (age 43)
20	Raphael Vieira de Oliveira	14 June 1979 (age 46)
Coach	Bernardo Rezende	28 March 1959 (age 66)

== Bulgaria ==
#NR	NAME	BIRTHDATE
1	Georgi Bratoev	21 October 1987 (age 38)
2	Hristo Tsvetanov	29 March 1978 (age 47)
3	Andrey Zhekov	12 March 1980 (age 45)
4	Vladislav Ivanov (L)	14 March 1987 (age 38)
5	Svetoslav Gotsev	31 August 1990 (age 35)
6	Matey Kaziyski	23 September 1984 (age 41)
7	Konstantin Mitev	27 October 1984 (age 41)
8	Boyan Yordanov	12 March 1983 (age 42)
9	Metodi Ananiev	17 February 1986 (age 40)
10	Valentin Bratoev	21 October 1987 (age 38)
11	Vladimir Nikolov (C)	3 October 1977 (age 48)
12	Viktor Yosifov	16 October 1985 (age 40)
13	Martin Bozhilov	11 April 1988 (age 37)
14	Teodor Todorov	1 September 1989 (age 36)
15	Todor Aleksiev	21 April 1983 (age 42)
16	Kostadin Gadzhanov	18 March 1986 (age 39)
17	Nikolay Penchev	22 May 1992 (age 33)
18	Miroslav Gradinarov	10 February 1985 (age 41)
19	Tsvetan Sokolov	31 December 1989 (age 36)
20	Danail Milushev	3 February 1984 (age 42)
Coach	Radostin Stoychev	25 September 1969 (age 56)

== Cuba ==
#NR	NAME	BIRTHDATE
1	Wilfredo León Venero (C)	31 July 1993 (age 32)
2	Lian Sem Estrada Jova	12 December 1982 (age 43)
3	Gustavo Leyva Álvarez	14 December 1985 (age 40)
4	Yassel Perdomo	23 March 1993 (age 32)
5	Leandro Macías Infante	13 February 1990 (age 36)
6	Keibir Gutiérrez (L)	6 May 1987 (age 38)
7	Osmany Roberto Camejo Durruthy	18 February 1983 (age 43)
8	Rolando Cepeda Abreu	13 March 1989 (age 36)
9	Livan Osoria Rodríguez	17 February 1986 (age 40)
10	Denny de Jesús Hernández Martínez	24 February 1994 (age 32)
11	Lázaro Fundora	13 February 1994 (age 32)
12	Henry Bell Cisnero	27 July 1982 (age 43)
13	Robertlandy Simón	11 June 1987 (age 38)
14	Raydel Hierrezuelo	14 July 1987 (age 38)
15	Dariel Albo	11 February 1992 (age 34)
16	Isbel Mesa Sandobal	2 June 1989 (age 36)
17	Yosnier Guillen Gato (L)	20 October 1988 (age 37)
18	Yoandri Díaz	4 January 1985 (age 41)
19	Fernando Hernández Ramos	11 September 1989 (age 36)
Coach	Samuels Blackwood	31 December 1946 (age 79)

== Finland ==
#NR	NAME	BIRTHDATE
1	Sauli Sinkkonen	14 September 1989 (age 36)
2	Eemi Tervaportti	26 July 1989 (age 36)
3	Mikko Esko	3 September 1978 (age 47)
4	Tommi Roininen	1 February 1984 (age 42)
5	Antti Siltala	14 March 1984 (age 41)
6	Tuomas Sammelvuo (C)	16 February 1976 (age 50)
7	Matti Hietanen	3 January 1983 (age 43)
8	Jari Tuominen	11 September 1986 (age 39)
9	Tuomas Tihinen	26 December 1979 (age 46)
10	Urpo Sivula	15 March 1988 (age 37)
11	Henri Tuomi	14 December 1982 (age 43)
12	Olli Kunnari	2 February 1982 (age 44)
13	Mikko Oivanen	26 May 1986 (age 39)
14	Konstantin Shumov	15 February 1985 (age 41)
15	Matti Oivanen	26 May 1986 (age 39)
16	Joni Mikkonen	13 June 1986 (age 39)
17	Jani Sippola	4 May 1990 (age 35)
18	Jukka Lehtonen	22 February 1982 (age 44)
19	Pasi Hyvärinen	22 November 1987 (age 38)
20	Jarmo Korhonen	25 July 1986 (age 39)
Coach	Daniel Castellani	21 March 1961 (age 64)

== France ==
#NR	NAME	BIRTHDATE
1	Xavier Kapfer	7 November 1981 (age 44)
2	Jenia Grebennikov	13 August 1990 (age 35)
3	Gérald Hardy-Dessources	9 February 1983 (age 43)
4	Antonin Rouzier	18 August 1986 (age 39)
5	Romain Vadeleux	12 February 1983 (age 43)
6	Benjamin Toniutti	30 October 1989 (age 36)
7	Nicolas Marechal	4 March 1987 (age 39)
8	Marien Moreau	25 October 1983 (age 42)
9	Guillaume Samica (C)	28 September 1981 (age 44)
10	Jean-Philippe Sol	1 January 1986 (age 40)
11	Julien Lyneel	15 April 1990 (age 35)
12	Marc Zopie	31 May 1987 (age 38)
13	Pierre Pujol	13 July 1984 (age 41)
14	Toafa Takaniko	29 May 1985 (age 40)
15	Samuele Tuia	24 July 1986 (age 39)
16	Guillaume Quesque	29 April 1989 (age 36)
17	Franck Lafitte	8 March 1989 (age 36)
18	Jean-François Exiga	9 March 1982 (age 43)
19	Baptiste Geiler	12 March 1987 (age 38)
20	Mory Sidibe	17 June 1987 (age 38)
Coach	Philippe Blain	20 May 1960 (age 65)

== Germany ==
#NR	NAME	BIRTHDATE
1	Marcus Popp	23 September 1981 (age 44)
2	Markus Steuerwald	7 March 1989 (age 37)
3	Sebastian Schwarz	2 October 1985 (age 40)
4	Simon Tischer	24 April 1982 (age 43)
5	Björn Andrae	14 May 1981 (age 44)
6	Denys Kaliberda	24 June 1990 (age 35)
7	Jaromir Zachrich	14 April 1985 (age 40)
8	Marcus Böhme	25 August 1985 (age 40)
9	Stefan Hübner	13 June 1975 (age 50)
10	Jochen Schöps	8 October 1983 (age 42)
11	Lukas Kampa	29 November 1986 (age 39)
12	Ferdinand Tille (L)	8 December 1988 (age 37)
13	Christian Dünnes	16 June 1984 (age 41)
14	Robert Kromm (C)	9 March 1984 (age 41)
15	Max Günthör	9 August 1985 (age 40)
16	Christian Fromm	15 August 1990 (age 35)
17	Patrick Steuerwald	3 March 1986 (age 40)
18	Falko Steinke	26 March 1985 (age 40)
19	Tim Broshog	2 December 1987 (age 38)
20	Ricardo Galandi	18 May 1989 (age 36)
Coach	Raúl Lozano	3 September 1956 (age 69)

== Italy ==
#NR	NAME	BIRTHDATE
1	Enrico Cester	16 March 1988 (age 37)
2	Jiri Kovar	10 April 1989 (age 36)
3	Massimo Colaci	21 February 1985 (age 41)
4	Andrea Bari (L)	5 March 1980 (age 46)
5	Giorgio De Togni	7 July 1985 (age 40)
6	Rocco Barone	14 December 1987 (age 38)
7	Michal Lasko	11 March 1981 (age 44)
8	Gabriele Maruotti	25 March 1988 (age 37)
9	Ivan Zaytsev	2 October 1988 (age 37)
10	Marco Falaschi	18 September 1987 (age 38)
11	Cristian Savani (C)	22 February 1982 (age 44)
12	Simone Buti	19 September 1983 (age 42)
13	Dragan Travica	28 August 1986 (age 39)
14	Stefano Patriarca	23 July 1987 (age 38)
15	Emanuele Birarelli	8 February 1981 (age 45)
16	Michele Baranowicz	5 August 1989 (age 36)
17	Dore Della Lunga	25 July 1984 (age 41)
18	Giulio Sabbi	10 August 1989 (age 36)
19	Daniele De Pandis (L)	30 June 1984 (age 41)
20	Mattia Rosso	28 May 1985 (age 40)
Coach	Mauro Berruto	8 May 1969 (age 56)

== Japan ==
#NR	NAME	BIRTHDATE
1	Daisuke Sakai (L)	22 October 1981 (age 44)
2	Yuta Abe	8 August 1981 (age 44)
3	Takeshi Nagano (L)	11 July 1985 (age 40)
4	Yusuke Matsuta	31 October 1982 (age 43)
5	Daisuke Usami (C)	29 March 1979 (age 46)
6	Yoshifumi Suzuki	31 March 1983 (age 42)
7	Takahiro Yamamoto	12 July 1978 (age 47)
8	Yuya Ageba	30 September 1983 (age 42)
9	Takaaki Tomimatsu	20 July 1984 (age 41)
10	Osamu Tanabe (L)	10 April 1979 (age 46)
11	Naoya Suga	17 May 1985 (age 40)
12	Kota Yamamura	20 October 1980 (age 45)
13	Kunihiro Shimizu	11 August 1986 (age 39)
14	Tatsuya Fukuzawa	1 July 1986 (age 39)
15	Tatsuya Yoneyama	23 September 1986 (age 39)
16	Yusuke Ishijima	9 January 1984 (age 42)
17	Yu Koshikawa	30 June 1984 (age 41)
18	Yuta Yoneyama	29 August 1984 (age 41)
19	Shogo Okamoto	30 March 1987 (age 38)
20	Takashi Dekita	13 August 1991 (age 34)
Coach	Tatsuya Ueta	25 July 1964 (age 61)

== Poland ==
#NR	NAME	BIRTHDATE
1	Piotr Nowakowski	18 December 1987 (age 38)
2	Paweł Zatorski	21 June 1990 (age 35)
3	Piotr Gruszka (C)	8 March 1977 (age 48)
4	Grzegorz Kosok	2 March 1986 (age 40)
5	Karol Kłos	8 August 1989 (age 36)
6	Bartosz Kurek	29 August 1988 (age 37)
7	Jakub Jarosz	10 February 1987 (age 39)
8	Bartosz Janeczek	12 July 1987 (age 38)
9	Zbigniew Bartman	4 May 1987 (age 38)
10	Marcel Gromadowski	19 December 1985 (age 40)
11	Fabian Drzyzga	3 January 1990 (age 36)
12	Paweł Woicki	19 June 1983 (age 42)
13	Michał Kubiak	18 July 1988 (age 37)
14	Michał Ruciak	22 August 1983 (age 42)
15	Łukasz Żygadło	2 August 1979 (age 46)
16	Krzysztof Ignaczak	15 May 1978 (age 47)
17	Michał Bąkiewicz	22 March 1981 (age 44)
18	Marcin Możdżonek	9 February 1985 (age 41)
19	Mateusz Mika	21 January 1991 (age 35)
20	Piotr Hain	26 February 1991 (age 35)
Coach	Andrea Anastasi	10 August 1960 (age 65)

== Portugal ==
#NR	NAME	BIRTHDATE
1	Marcel Gil	8 May 1990 (age 35)
2	Carlos Teixeira	11 March 1976 (age 49)
3	Manuel Silva	28 December 1973 (age 52)
4	João Malveiro	8 December 1979 (age 46)
5	Marco Ferreira	4 October 1987 (age 38)
6	Alexandre Ferreira	13 November 1991 (age 34)
7	Ivo Casas	21 September 1992 (age 33)
8	Tiago Violas	27 March 1989 (age 36)
9	Carlos Fidalgo	16 May 1987 (age 38)
10	Filipe Pinto	26 February 1991 (age 35)
11	Frederico Siqueira	5 April 1983 (age 42)
12	João José (C)	7 June 1978 (age 47)
13	Valdir Sequeira	22 November 1981 (age 44)
14	Flávio Cruz	28 August 1982 (age 43)
15	Rui Santos	24 March 1984 (age 41)
16	Hugo Gaspar	2 September 1982 (age 43)
17	João Fidalgo	2 November 1986 (age 39)
18	André Lopes	12 September 1982 (age 43)
19	José Monteiro	21 October 1991 (age 34)
20	João Simões	11 June 1986 (age 39)
Coach	Juan Díaz

== Puerto Rico ==
#NR	NAME	BIRTHDATE
1	José Rivera	2 July 1977 (age 48)
2	Gregory Berrios	24 January 1979 (age 47)
3	Juan Figueroa	3 June 1986 (age 39)
4	Víctor Rivera	30 August 1976 (age 49)
5	Roberto Muñiz	11 June 1980 (age 45)
6	Ángel Pérez	20 May 1982 (age 43)
7	Enrique Escalante	6 August 1984 (age 41)
8	Daniel Erazo	16 August 1987 (age 38)
9	Edgardo Goas	27 January 1989 (age 37)
10	Jorge Antonio López	6 February 1992 (age 34)
11	Steven Morales	7 April 1992 (age 33)
12	Héctor Soto (C)	20 June 1978 (age 47)
13	Jean Carlos Ortiz	23 February 1988 (age 38)
14	Fernando Morales	4 February 1982 (age 44)
15	Ezequiel Cruz Lozada	15 July 1986 (age 39)
16	Sequiel Sánchez	24 March 1990 (age 35)
17	Ramón Burgos	15 January 1993 (age 33)
18	Cristian Rivera	8 August 1993 (age 32)
19	Joel Rivera	11 June 1981 (age 44)
20	Dennis Del Valle	26 January 1989 (age 37)
Coach	Carlos Cardona

== Russia ==
#NR	NAME	BIRTHDATE
1	Dmitriy Ilinykh	31 January 1987 (age 39)
2	Semyon Poltavskiy	8 February 1981 (age 45)
3	Nikolay Apalikov	26 August 1982 (age 43)
4	Taras Khtey (C)	22 May 1982 (age 43)
5	Sergey Grankin	21 January 1985 (age 41)
6	Nikolay Pavlov	22 May 1982 (age 43)
7	Sergey Makarov	28 March 1980 (age 45)
8	Denis Biriukov	8 December 1988 (age 37)
9	Alexander Sokolov (L)	1 March 1982 (age 44)
10	Yury Berezhko	27 January 1984 (age 42)
11	Dmitry Krasikov	8 February 1987 (age 39)
12	Alexander Butko	18 March 1986 (age 39)
13	Dmitriy Muserskiy	29 October 1988 (age 37)
14	Dmitry Shcherbinin	10 September 1989 (age 36)
15	Alexey Spiridonov	26 June 1988 (age 37)
16	Alexander Gutsalyuk	15 January 1988 (age 38)
17	Maxim Mikhaylov	19 March 1988 (age 37)
18	Alexander Volkov	14 February 1985 (age 41)
19	Valery Komarov	21 March 1980 (age 45)
20	Hachatur Stepanyan (L)	21 March 1985 (age 40)
Coach	Vladimir Alekno	31 December 1966 (age 59)

== Serbia ==
#NR	NAME	BIRTHDATE
1	Nikola Kovačević	14 February 1983 (age 43)
2	Uroš Kovačević	6 May 1993 (age 32)
3	Miloš Vemić	8 March 1987 (age 38)
4	Bojan Janić (C)	11 March 1982 (age 43)
5	Vlado Petković	6 January 1983 (age 43)
6	Miloš Terzić	13 June 1987 (age 38)
7	Dragan Stanković	18 October 1985 (age 40)
8	Marko Samardžić (L)	22 February 1983 (age 43)
9	Konstantin Čupković	2 January 1987 (age 39)
10	Miloš Nikić	31 March 1986 (age 39)
11	Mihajlo Mitić	17 September 1990 (age 35)
12	Milan Rašić	2 February 1985 (age 41)
13	Tomislav Dokić	27 February 1986 (age 40)
14	Aleksandar Atanasijević	4 September 1991 (age 34)
15	Saša Starović	19 October 1988 (age 37)
16	Veljko Petković	23 January 1977 (age 49)
17	Borislav Petrović	6 January 1988 (age 38)
18	Marko Podraščanin	29 August 1987 (age 38)
19	Nikola Rosić (L)	5 August 1984 (age 41)
20	Nemanja Radović	26 December 1990 (age 35)
Coach	Igor Kolaković	4 June 1965 (age 60)

== South Korea ==
#NR	NAME	BIRTHDATE
1	Song Byung-Il	3 April 1983 (age 42)
2	Han Sun-Soo	16 December 1985 (age 40)
3	Kwon Young-Min (C)	5 July 1980 (age 45)
4	Jeon Kwang-In	18 September 1991 (age 34)
5	Yeo Oh-Hyun (L)	2 September 1978 (age 47)
6	Lee Kyung-Soo	27 April 1979 (age 46)
7	Lee Sun-Kyu	14 March 1981 (age 44)
8	Kim Hak-Min	4 September 1983 (age 42)
9	Kwak Seung-Suk	23 March 1988 (age 37)
10	Yun Bong-Woo	20 January 1982 (age 44)
11	Park Chul-Woo	25 July 1985 (age 40)
12	Kim Jeong-Hwan	23 March 1988 (age 37)
13	Choi Hong-Suk	26 June 1988 (age 37)
14	Kim Yo-han	16 August 1985 (age 40)
15	Ha Hyun-Yong	9 May 1982 (age 43)
16	Park Jun-Bum	12 June 1988 (age 37)
17	Ha Kyoung-Min	27 July 1982 (age 43)
18	Shin Yung-Suk	4 October 1986 (age 39)
19	Lee Kang-Joo	30 June 1983 (age 42)
20	Kim Eun-Seop	15 June 1989 (age 36)
Coach	Park Ki-Won

== United States ==
#NR	NAME	BIRTHDATE
1	Matthew Anderson	18 April 1987 (age 38)
2	Sean Rooney	13 November 1982 (age 43)
3	Evan Patak	23 June 1984 (age 41)
4	David Lee	8 March 1982 (age 43)
5	Richard Lambourne	6 May 1975 (age 50)
6	Paul Lotman	3 November 1985 (age 40)
7	Donald Suxho	21 February 1976 (age 50)
8	William Priddy (C)	1 October 1977 (age 48)
9	Ryan Millar	22 January 1978 (age 48)
10	Brian Thornton	22 April 1985 (age 40)
11	Jonathan Winder	4 January 1986 (age 40)
12	Russell Holmes	1 July 1982 (age 43)
13	Clayton Stanley	20 January 1978 (age 48)
14	Kevin Hansen	19 March 1982 (age 43)
15	Gabriel Gardner	18 March 1976 (age 49)
16	Jayson Jablonsky	23 July 1985 (age 40)
17	Maxwell Holt	12 March 1987 (age 38)
18	Scott Touzinsky	22 April 1982 (age 43)
19	Robert Tarr	9 January 1984 (age 42)
20	David Smith	15 May 1985 (age 40)
Coach	Alan Knipe
