= Volleyball at the 2011 Pan American Games =

- Venue: Pan American Volleyball Stadium (indoor); Pan American Beach Volleyball Stadium (beach)
- Dates: October 15 – October 29
- Competitors: 256 from 20 nations

Volleyball competitions at the 2011 Pan American Games in Guadalajara were held from October 15 to October 29 at the Pan American Volleyball Stadium (indoor) and the Pan American Beach Volleyball Stadium (beach) in Puerto Vallarta. Each indoor team was made up of twelve athletes while each beach volleyball team consisted of one pair.

== Medal summary ==
=== Medal table ===
* Host nation (Mexico)

Rank	Nation	Gold	Silver	Bronze	Total
1	Brazil	4	0	0	4
2	Cuba	0	2	0	2
3	Mexico*	0	1	0	1
3	Venezuela	0	1	0	1
5	Argentina	0	0	2	2
6	Puerto Rico	0	0	1	1
6	United States	0	0	1	1
Totals (7 entries)		4	4	4	12

=== Events ===
Event	Gold	Silver	Bronze
Men's indoor	Brazil; Thiago Alves; Maurício Borges Silva; Éder Carbonera; Mario Pedreira Junior; Maurício Souza; Wallace de Souza; Gustavo Endres; Luiz Felipe Fonteles; Wallace Martins; Murilo Radke; Bruno Rezende; Renato Russomanno	Cuba; Dariel Albo; Henry Bell Cisnero; Rolando Cepeda; Yoandry Díaz; Yulián Durán; Yosnier Guillen; Keibel Gutiérrez; Fernando Hernández; Raydel Hierrezuelo; Wilfredo León; Isbel Mesa; Yassel Perdomo	Argentina; Nicolás Bruno; Iván Castellani; Maximiliano Cavanna; Pablo Crer; Maximiliano Gauna; Mariano Giustiniano; Franco López; Federico Pereyra; Gonzalo Quiroga; Sebastián Solé; Alejandro Toro; Nicolás Uriarte
Women's indoor	Brazil; Fabiana Claudino; Juciely Cristina Barreto; Dani Lins; Paula Pequeno; Thaísa Menezes; Marianne Steinbrecher; Jaqueline Carvalho; Tandara Caixeta; Sheilla Castro; Fabiana de Oliveira; Fernanda Garay; Fabíola de Souza	Cuba; Emily Borrell; Kenia Carcaces; Liannes Castañeda; Ana Cleger; Rosanna Giel; Daymara Lescay; Yoana Palacios; Alena Rojas; Wilma Salas; Yanelis Santos; Yusidey Silié; Gyselle Silva	United States; Keao Burdine; Angela Forsett; Cynthia Barboza; Alexandra Klineman; Regan Hood; Cassidy Lichtman; Lauren Gibbemeyer; Jessica Jones; Carli Lloyd; Courtney Thompson; Kayla Banwarth; Tamari Miyashiro
Men's beach	Alison Cerutti and Emanuel Rego; Brazil	Igor Hernández and Farid Mussa; Venezuela	Santiago Etchgaray and Pablo Suárez; Argentina
Women's beach	Larissa França and Juliana Silva; Brazil	Bibiana Candelas and Mayra García; Mexico	Yarleen Santiago and Yamileska Yantín; Puerto Rico

== Men ==
The following nations qualified for the men's tournament:

NORCECA	CSV	Automatic qualifiers
Cuba; United States; Puerto Rico; Canada	Brazil; Argentina; Venezuela	Mexico

== Women ==
The following nations qualified for the women's tournament:

NORCECA	CSV	Automatic qualifiers
Cuba; United States; Puerto Rico; Canada; Dominican Republic	Brazil; Peru	Mexico

== Indoor Schedule ==
The competition will be spread out across fifteen days, with the women competing first, followed by the men.

Preliminary round	Quarterfinals	Semifinals	M	Event finals

October	15th Sat	16th Sun	17th Mon	18th Tue	19th Wed	20th Thu	21st Fri	22nd Sat	23rd Sun	24th Mon	25th Tue	26th Wed	27th Thu	28th Fri	29th Sat	Gold medals
Men															M	1
Women						M										1

== Beach schedule ==
All times are Central Daylight Time (UTC-5).

Day	Date	Start	Finish	Event	Phase
Day 3	Sunday October 16, 2011	9:00	18:00	Women's tournament	Preliminaries
Day 4	Monday October 17, 2011	9:00	18:00	Women's tournament	Preliminaries
Day 4	Monday October 17, 2011	9:00	18:00	Men's tournament	Preliminaries
Day 5	Tuesday October 18, 2011	9:00	18:00	Women's tournament	Preliminaries
Day 5	Tuesday October 18, 2011	9:00	18:00	Men's tournament	Preliminaries
Day 6	Wednesday October 19, 2011	9:00	18:00	Women's tournament	Quarterfinals
Day 6	Wednesday October 19, 2011	9:00	18:00	Men's tournament	Preliminaries
Day 7	Thursday October 20, 2011	9:00	15:00	Women's tournament	Semifinals
Day 7	Thursday October 20, 2011	9:00	15:00	Men's tournament	Quarterfinals
Day 8	Friday October 21, 2011	10:00	16:00	Women's tournament	Gold/Bronze medal matches
Day 8	Friday October 21, 2011	10:00	16:00	Men's tournament	Semifinals
Day 9	Saturday October 22, 2011	11:00	15:00	Men's tournament	Gold/Bronze medal matches

== See also ==
- 2011 Pan American Games
