= 2011 Men's NORCECA Volleyball Championship =

2011 Men's NORCECA Championship

Tournament details
- Host country: Puerto Rico
- Dates: 29 August – 3 September
- Teams: 8
- Venue: 1 (in 1 host city)

Final positions
- Champions: Cuba (15th title)

Tournament awards
- MVP: (Cuba) Keibel Gutiérrez

The 2011 Men's NORCECA Volleyball Championship was the 22nd edition of the Men's Continental Volleyball Tournament, played from 29 August to 3 September 2011 in the Palacio de Recreación y Deportes in Mayaguez, Puerto Rico. The winner qualified for the 2011 FIVB Men's World Cup, held in November in Japan.

== Teams ==
Pool A	Pool B
Puerto Rico; Canada; Mexico; Saint Lucia	United States; Cuba; Costa Rica; Trinidad and Tobago

== Pool standing procedure ==
1. Number of matches won
2. Match points
3. Points ratio
4. Sets ratio
5. Result of the last match between the tied teams

Match won 3–0: 5 match points for the winner, 0 match point for the loser
Match won 3–1: 4 match points for the winner, 1 match points for the loser
Match won 3–2: 3 match points for the winner, 2 match points for the loser

== Preliminary round ==
- All times are Atlantic Standard Time (UTC−04:00).

=== Pool A ===
Pos	Team	Pld	W	L	Pts	SPW	SPL	SPR	SW	SL	SR	Qualification
1	Canada	3	3	0	14	250	192	1.302	9	1	9.000	Semifinals
2	Puerto Rico	3	2	1	10	206	175	1.177	6	3	2.000	Quarterfinals
3	Mexico	3	1	2	6	229	229	1.000	4	6	0.667	Quarterfinals
4	Saint Lucia	3	0	3	0	136	225	0.604	0	9	0.000	

Date	Time		Score		Set 1	Set 2	Set 3	Set 4	Set 5	Total	Report
29 Aug	17:02	Canada	3–1	Mexico	25–21	23–25	27–25	25–22		100–93	P2 P3
29 Aug	20:45	Puerto Rico	3–0	Saint Lucia	25–11	25–17	25–11			75–39	P2 P3
30 Aug	14:00	Saint Lucia	0–3	Canada	18–25	14–25	13–25			45–75	P2 P3
30 Aug	20:15	Mexico	0–3	Puerto Rico	25–27	19–25	17–25			61–77	P2 P3
31 Aug	16:00	Saint Lucia	0–3	Mexico	16–25	14–25	22–25			52–75	P2 P3
31 Aug	20:18	Puerto Rico	0–3	Canada	17–25	20–25	17–25			54–75	P2 P3

=== Pool B ===
Pos	Team	Pld	W	L	Pts	SPW	SPL	SPR	SW	SL	SR	Qualification
1	United States	3	3	0	14	249	160	1.556	9	1	9.000	Semifinals
2	Cuba	3	2	1	11	239	185	1.292	7	3	2.333	Quarterfinals
3	Trinidad and Tobago	3	1	2	5	155	217	0.714	3	6	0.500	Quarterfinals
4	Costa Rica	3	0	3	0	148	229	0.646	0	9	0.000	

Date	Time		Score		Set 1	Set 2	Set 3	Set 4	Set 5	Total	Report
29 Aug	13:03	United States	3–0	Trinidad and Tobago	25–15	25–7	25–12			75–34	P2 P3
29 Aug	15:03	Cuba	3–0	Costa Rica	25–16	25–13	25–15			75–44	P2 P3
30 Aug	16:00	Trinidad and Tobago	0–3	Cuba	14–25	15–25	13–25			42–75	P2 P3
30 Aug	18:00	Costa Rica	0–3	United States	16–25	12–25	9–25			37–75	P2 P3
31 Aug	14:00	Trinidad and Tobago	3–0	Costa Rica	26–24	25–17	28–26			79–67	P2 P3
31 Aug	18:00	United States	3–1	Cuba	24–26	25–23	25–23	25–17		99–89	P2 P3

== Final round ==
- All times are Atlantic Standard Time (UTC−04:00).

=== Championship bracket ===
Quarterfinals
1 September
Cuba	3
Mexico	0
1 September
Puerto Rico	3
Trinidad and Tobago	0

Semifinals
2 September
Canada	2
Cuba	3
2 September
United States	3
Puerto Rico	0

Final
3 September
Cuba	3
United States	2
3rd place
3 September
Canada	3
Puerto Rico	0

=== 5th–8th places bracket ===
5th–8th semifinals
2 September
Saint Lucia	0
Trinidad and Tobago	3
2 September
Costa Rica	2
Mexico	3

5th place
3 September
Trinidad and Tobago	0
Mexico	3
7th place
3 September
Saint Lucia	0
Costa Rica	3

=== Quarterfinals ===
Date	Time		Score		Set 1	Set 2	Set 3	Set 4	Set 5	Total	Report
01 Sep	18:00	Cuba	3–0	Mexico	25–10	25–23	25–14			75–47	P2 P3
01 Sep	20:15	Puerto Rico	3–0	Trinidad and Tobago	25–17	25–15	25–19			75–51	P2 P3

=== 5th–8th semifinals ===
Date	Time		Score		Set 1	Set 2	Set 3	Set 4	Set 5	Total	Report
02 Sep	14:00	Saint Lucia	0–3	Trinidad and Tobago	20–25	21–25	17–25			58–75	P2 P3
02 Sep	16:00	Costa Rica	2–3	Mexico	25–23	25–22	12–25	15–25	11–15	88–110	P2 P3

=== Semifinals ===
Date	Time		Score		Set 1	Set 2	Set 3	Set 4	Set 5	Total	Report
02 Sep	18:25	Canada	2–3	Cuba	25–23	17–25	26–24	17–25	9–15	94–112	P2 P3
02 Sep	21:03	United States	3–0	Puerto Rico	25–14	25–16	26–24			76–54	P2 P3

=== 7th place ===
Date	Time		Score		Set 1	Set 2	Set 3	Set 4	Set 5	Total	Report
03 Sep	14:00	Saint Lucia	0–3	Costa Rica	23–25	10–25	18–25			51–75	P2 P3

=== 5th place ===
Date	Time		Score		Set 1	Set 2	Set 3	Set 4	Set 5	Total	Report
03 Sep	16:00	Trinidad and Tobago	0–3	Mexico	20–25	12–25	21–25			53–75	P2 P3

=== 3rd place ===
Date	Time		Score		Set 1	Set 2	Set 3	Set 4	Set 5	Total	Report
03 Sep	18:00	Canada	3–0	Puerto Rico	25–20	25–23	25–14			75–57	P2 P3

=== Final ===
Date	Time		Score		Set 1	Set 2	Set 3	Set 4	Set 5	Total	Report
03 Sep	20:00	Cuba	3–2	United States	25–23	29–27	25–27	19–25	15–8	113–110	P2 P3

== Final standing ==
Rank	Team
1st place, gold medalist(s)	Cuba
2nd place, silver medalist(s)	United States
3rd place, bronze medalist(s)	Canada
4	Puerto Rico
5	Mexico
6	Trinidad and Tobago
7	Costa Rica
8	Saint Lucia

2011 Men's NORCECA champions

Cuba
15th title

== Awards ==
- MVP: (Cuba) Keibel Gutiérrez
- Best scorer: (Cuba) Wilfredo León
- Best spiker: (Cuba) Wilfredo León
- Best blocker: (United States) David Lee
- Best server: (Cuba) Fernando Hernández
- Best digger: (Cuba) Keibel Gutiérrez
- Best setter: (Canada) Dustin Schneider
- Best receiver: (Cuba) Keibel Gutiérrez
- Best libero: (Cuba) Keibel Gutiérrez
- Jim Coleman Award: (Cuba) Orlando Samuels
