= Volleyball at the 2011 Pan American Games – Men's tournament =

Volleyball – Men's tournament at the 2011 Pan American Games
- Venue: Pan American Volleyball Complex
- Dates: October 24 – October 29
- Competitors: 96 from 8 nations

Medalists
Gold medal	Brazil
Silver medal	Cuba
Bronze medal	Argentina

The men's tournament of volleyball at the 2011 Pan American Games in Guadalajara, Mexico will begin on October 24 and end on October 29. All games will be held at the Pan American Volleyball Complex. The defending champions are Brazil.

== Teams ==
=== Qualification ===
The following nations qualified for the men's tournament:

Event	Date	Location	Vacancies	Qualified
Host Nation	–	–	1	Mexico
FIVB + 2010 Men's Pan-American Volleyball Cup rankings	January 1, 2011	–	7	Brazil; Cuba; United States; Argentina; Venezuela; Puerto Rico; Canada
TOTAL			8	

=== Squads ===
At the start of tournament, all eight participating countries had 12 players on their rosters. Final squads for the tournament are due on September 14, 2011, a month before the start of 2011 Pan American Games.

- Argentina
- Brazil
- Canada
- Cuba
- Mexico
- Puerto Rico
- United States
- Venezuela

== Preliminary round ==
All times are local Central Daylight Time (UTC-5)

=== Group A ===
Pos	Team	Pld	W	L	Pts	SPW	SPL	SPR	SW	SL	SR	Qualification
1	Cuba	3	3	0	13	257	224	1.147	9	2	4.500	Semifinals
2	Argentina	3	2	1	8	331	331	1.000	8	7	1.143	Quarterfinals
3	Mexico	3	1	2	6	271	278	0.975	5	7	0.714	Quarterfinals
4	Venezuela	3	0	3	3	266	292	0.911	3	9	0.333	

Date		Score		Set 1	Set 2	Set 3	Set 4	Set 5	Total	Report
Oct 24	Cuba	3–2	Argentina	25–22	18–25	24–26	25–18	15–13	107–104	Report
Oct 24	Venezuela	1–3	Mexico	23–25	20–25	28–26	21–25		92–101	Report
Oct 25	Cuba	3–0	Venezuela	25–20	25–21	25–17			75–58	Report
Oct 25	Argentina	3–2	Mexico	25–23	25–23	25–27	21–25	15–10	111–108	Report
Oct 26	Argentina	3–2	Venezuela	25–23	21–25	29–27	23–25	18–16	116–116	Report
Oct 26	Cuba	3–0	Mexico	25–18	25–21	25–23			75–62	Report

=== Group B ===
Pos	Team	Pld	W	L	Pts	SPW	SPL	SPR	SW	SL	SR	Qualification
1	Brazil	3	3	0	14	243	171	1.421	9	1	9.000	Semifinals
2	Puerto Rico	3	1	2	7	227	244	0.930	5	6	0.833	Quarterfinals
3	United States	3	1	2	6	313	324	0.966	6	8	0.750	Quarterfinals
4	Canada	3	1	2	3	238	282	0.844	3	8	0.375	

Date		Score		Set 1	Set 2	Set 3	Set 4	Set 5	Total	Report
Oct 24	United States	3–2	Puerto Rico	22–25	25–19	20–25	25–16	15–13	107–98	Report
Oct 24	Brazil	3–0	Canada	25–17	25–13	25–13			75–43	Report
Oct 25	Brazil	3–0	Puerto Rico	25–22	25–14	25–18			75–54	Report
Oct 25	United States	2–3	Canada	25–21	23–25	39–37	33–35	12–15	132–133	Report
Oct 26	Puerto Rico	3–0	Canada	25–22	25–17	25–23			75–62	Report
Oct 26	Brazil	3–1	United States	18–25	25–17	25–14	25–18		93–74	Report

== Elimination round ==
=== Championship bracket ===
Quarterfinals
A2	Argentina	3
B3	United States	2
B2	Puerto Rico	2
A3	Mexico	3

Semifinals
B1	Brazil	3
A2	Argentina	1
A1	Cuba	3
A3	Mexico	2

Final
B1	Brazil	3
A1	Cuba	1
Third place
A2	Argentina	3
A3	Mexico	2

=== 5th–8th places bracket ===
Classification 5/8
Puerto Rico	1
Canada	3
United States	3
Venezuela	2

5th Place Match
United States	3
Canada	2
7th Place Match
Venezuela	2
Puerto Rico	3

=== Quarterfinals ===
Date		Score		Set 1	Set 2	Set 3	Set 4	Set 5	Total	Report
Oct 27	Argentina	3–2	United States	25–17	19–25	25–18	17–25	15–11	101–96	Report
Oct 27	Puerto Rico	2–3	Mexico	26–24	25–16	26–28	21–25	9–15	107–108	Report

=== Fifth to eighth place classification ===
Date		Score		Set 1	Set 2	Set 3	Set 4	Set 5	Total	Report
Oct 28	Canada	3–1	Puerto Rico	25–20	19–25	25–19	25–20		94–84	Report
Oct 28	United States	3–2	Venezuela	21–25	25–17	21–25	25–18	15–13	107–98	Report

=== Seventh place match ===
Date		Score		Set 1	Set 2	Set 3	Set 4	Set 5	Total	Report
Oct 29	Venezuela	2–3	Puerto Rico	23–25	19–25	25–19	25–21	8–15	100–105	Report

=== Fifth place match ===
Date		Score		Set 1	Set 2	Set 3	Set 4	Set 5	Total	Report
Oct 29	United States	3–2	Canada	22–25	25–15	25–19	21–25	19–17	112–101	Report

=== Semifinals ===
Date		Score		Set 1	Set 2	Set 3	Set 4	Set 5	Total	Report
Oct 28	Cuba	3–2	Mexico	25–21	25–27	28–30	25–15	17–15	120–108	Report
Oct 28	Brazil	3–1	Argentina	26–28	27–25	25–22	25–15		103–90	Report

=== Bronze medal match ===
Date		Score		Set 1	Set 2	Set 3	Set 4	Set 5	Total	Report
Oct 29	Argentina	3–2	Mexico	25–18	22–25	20–25	25–22	15–13	107–104	Report

=== Gold medal match ===
Date		Score		Set 1	Set 2	Set 3	Set 4	Set 5	Total	Report
Oct 29	Brazil	3–1	Cuba	25–11	24–26	25–18	25–19		99–74	Report

2011 Men's Pan American Games

Brazil
4th title

== Final standings ==
Rank	Team
1st place, gold medalist(s)	Brazil
2nd place, silver medalist(s)	Cuba
3rd place, bronze medalist(s)	Argentina
4	Mexico
5	United States
6	Canada
7	Puerto Rico
8	Venezuela

== Awards ==
- MVP: Wilfredo Leon (CUB)
- Best scorer:Ivan Contreras (MEX)
- Best spiker: Wallace de Souza (BRA)
- Best blocker:Sebastian Sole (ARG)
- Best server: Fernando Hernandez Ramos (CUB)
- Best digger: Blair Bann (CAN)
- Best setter: Bruno Rezende (BRA)
- Best receiver: Mario Da Silva (BRA)
- Best libero:Hector Mata (VEN)

== Medalists ==
Event	Gold	Silver	Bronze
Men's tournament	Brazil; Thiago Alves; Maurício Borges Silva; Éder Carbonera; Mario Pedreira Junior; Maurício Souza; Wallace de Souza; Gustavo Endres; Luiz Felipe Fonteles; Wallace Martins; Murilo Radke; Bruno Rezende; Renato Russomanno	Cuba; Dariel Albo; Henry Bell Cisnero; Rolando Cepeda; Yoandri Díaz; Yulián Durán; Yosnier Guillen; Keibel Gutiérrez; Fernando Hernández; Raydel Hierrezuelo; Wilfredo León; Isbel Mesa; Yassel Perdomo	Argentina; Nicolás Bruno; Iván Castellani; Maximiliano Cavanna; Pablo Crer; Maximiliano Gauna; Mariano Giustiniano; Franco López; Federico Pereyra; Gonzalo Quiroga; Sebastián Solé; Alejandro Toro; Nicolás Uriarte
