= Facundo Santucci =

Argentine volleyball player (born 1987)

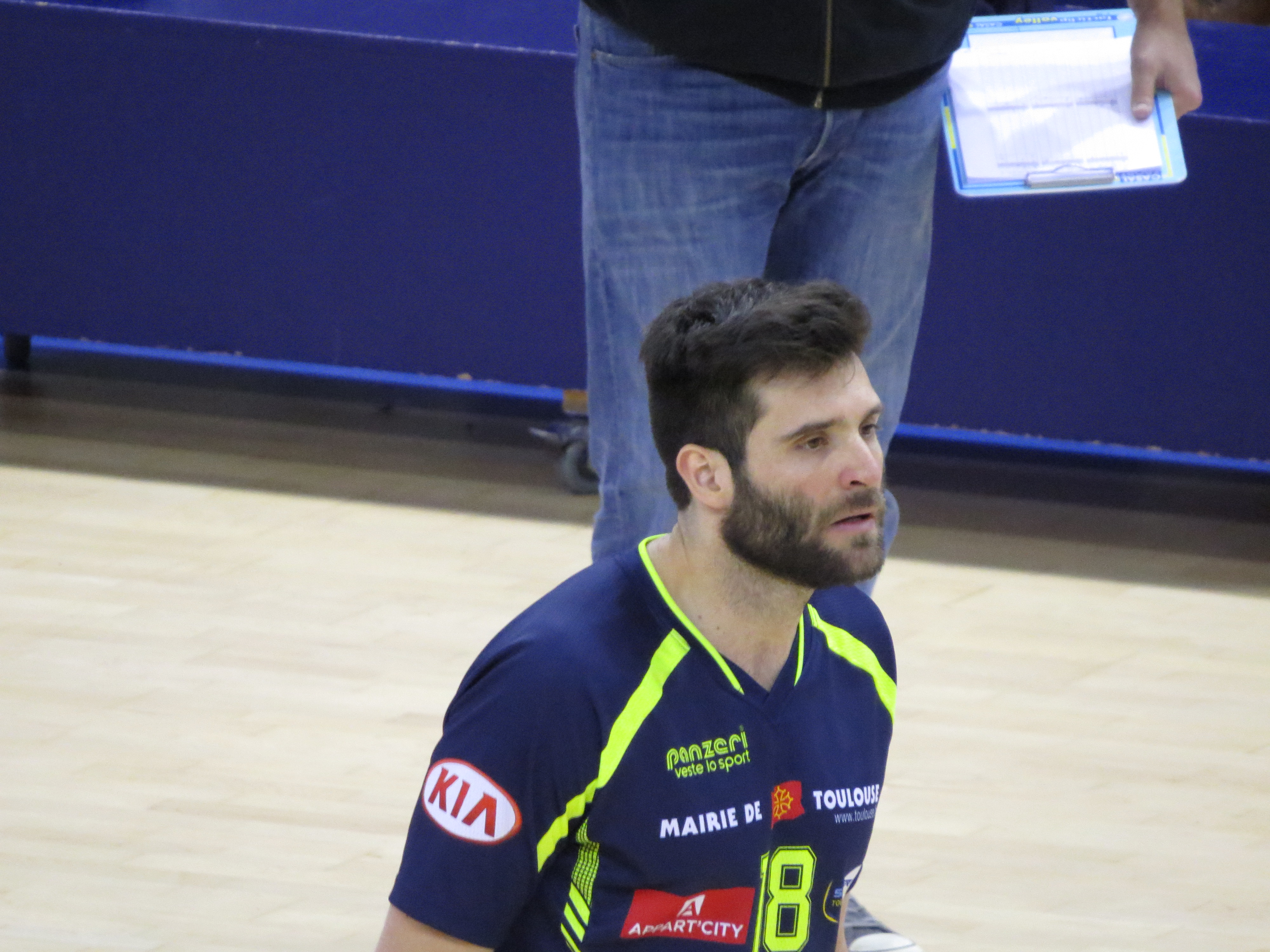

Personal information
- Nationality: Argentine
- Born: 6 March 1987 (age 39)
- Height: 186 cm (6 ft 1 in)
- Weight: 86 kg (190 lb)
- Spike: 326 cm (128 in)
- Block: 296 cm (117 in)

Volleyball information
- Number: 24 (national team)

Career
| Years | Teams |
|---|---|
| 2015 | Toulouse Club |

National team
| 2015 | Argentina |
Honours
South American Championship
| Silver medal – second place | 2015 Maceió |

Facundo Santucci (born 6 March 1987) is an Argentine male volleyball player. He is part of the Argentina men's national volleyball team. At club level he plays for Toulouse Club.

Awards
| Preceded by (Brazil) Mario da Silva Pedreira Junior | Best Libero of South American Championship; 2015 | Succeeded by TBD |
