= Steven Morales =

Puerto Rican volleyball player (born 1992)

Personal information
- Nationality: Puerto Rican
- Born: April 7, 1992 (age 34)
- Hometown: Mayagüez, Puerto Rico
- Height: 195 cm (6 ft 5 in)
- Weight: 82 kg (181 lb)
- Spike: 346 cm (136 in)
- Block: 317 cm (125 in)

Volleyball information
- Current club: (Libya) Alittihad Misurata SC

Career
Years	Teams
2010; 2011–2012; 2013; 2014; 2015–2016; 2016; 2016–	(Puerto Rico) Plataneros de Corozal (Puerto Rico) Mets de Guaynabo (Puerto Rico) Caribes de San Sebastián (Puerto Rico) Patriotas de Lares (Puerto Rico) Plataneros de Corozal (Czech Republic) Odonela Voda (Libya) Alittihad Misurata SC

National team
2011–	Puerto Rico
- Last updated: December 22, 2016

Steven Morales (born April 7, 1992) is a Puerto Rican male volleyball player who currently plays for Libyan club Alittihad Misurata SC. He is a member of the Puerto Rico men's national volleyball team since 2011.
