= Pablo Guzmán (volleyball, born 1988) =

Argentine volleyball player (born 1988)

Pablo Guzman

Personal information
- Nationality: Argentine
- Born: 6 April 1988 (age 38)
- Height: 193 cm (6 ft 4 in)
- Weight: 94 kg (207 lb)
- Spike: 350 cm (138 in)
- Block: 335 cm (132 in)

Volleyball information
- Number: 20 (national team)

Career
Years	Teams
2015	Lomas Volley

National team
2015	Argentina

Pablo Guzman (born 6 April 1988) is an Argentine male volleyball player. He is part of the Argentina men's national volleyball team. At club level he plays for Lomas Volley.
