= Ciaran McGovern =

Canadian volleyball player (born 1989)

Personal information
- Nationality: Canadian
- Born: 5 June 1989 (age 37)
- Height: 181 cm (5 ft 11 in)
- Weight: 80 kg (176 lb)
- Spike: 336 cm (132 in)
- Block: 312 cm (123 in)

Volleyball information
- Number: 20 (national team)

Career
Years	Teams
2013-2015	Swd Powervolleys Duren

National team
2011-2015	Canada

Ciaran McGovern (born 5 June 1989) is a Canadian former male volleyball player. He was part of the Canada men's national volleyball team. On club level he played for Swd Powervolleys Duren.
