= Fernando Hernández (volleyball) =

Cuban volleyball player (born 1989)

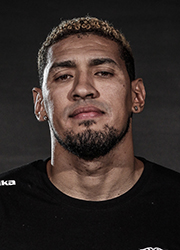

Personal information
- Full name: Fernando Hernández Ramos
- Nickname: Tiger
- Nationality: Cuban
- Born: 11 September 1989 (age 37)
- Height: 1.96 m (6 ft 5 in)
- Weight: 82 kg (181 lb)
- Spike: 358 cm (141 in)
- Block: 339 cm (133 in)

Volleyball information
- Position: Opposite
- Current club: (Greece) PAOK Thessaloniki

Career
Years	Teams
2008–2013; 2013–2015; 2015–2016; 2016–2017; 2017–2018; 2018–2019; 2019–2020; 2020–2022; 2022–2024; 2024–2025; 2025–	(Cuba) La Habana (Japan) JTEKT Stings (Italy) Exprivia Molfetta (Italy) LPR Piacenza (Turkey) Halkbank Ankara (Italy) Emma Villas Volley (Italy) Kioene Padova (Turkey) Halkbank Ankara (Greece) Panathinaikos; Kuwait Club (Greece) PAOK Thessaloniki

National team
2009–2012	Cuba
Honours
Men's volleyball
Representing Cuba
FIVB World Championship
Silver medal – second place	2010 Italy
FIVB World Grand Champions Cup
Silver medal – second place	2009 Japan
Pan American Games
Silver medal – second place	2011 Guadalajara
NORCECA Championship
Gold medal – first place	2009 Puerto Rico
Gold medal – first place	2011 Puerto Rico

Fernando Hernández Ramos (born 11 September 1989) is a Cuban volleyball player. He is a member of the Cuban men's national volleyball team and Greek club team PAOK Thessaloniki. He helped the Cuban team win the silver medal at the 2010 World Championship held in Italy.

== Sporting achievements ==
=== Clubs ===
- CEV Challenge Cup
  - 2021/2022 – with Halkbank Ankara (runner-up)
- National championships
  - 2017/2018 Turkish Cup, with Halkbank Ankara
  - 2017/2018 Turkish Championship, with Halkbank Ankara
  - 2022 Greek Super Cup, with Panathinaikos Athens

=== Youth national team ===
- 2008 NORCECA U21 Championship
- 2009 FIVB U21 World Championship

=== Individual awards ===
- 2008: NORCECA U21 Championship – Best server
- 2011: NORCECA Championship – Best server
- 2011: Pan American Games – Best Server
- 2011: FIVB World Cup – Best scorer
- 2016: Italian Championship – Best server
- 2017: Italian Cup – Best scorer
- 2020: Turkish Championship – Best opposite
- 2021: Turkish Cup – Best opposite
- 2022: Hellenic Super Cup – Most valuable player
- 2024: Hellenic Championship – Best scorer
