= Horacio d'Almeida =

French volleyball player (born 1988)

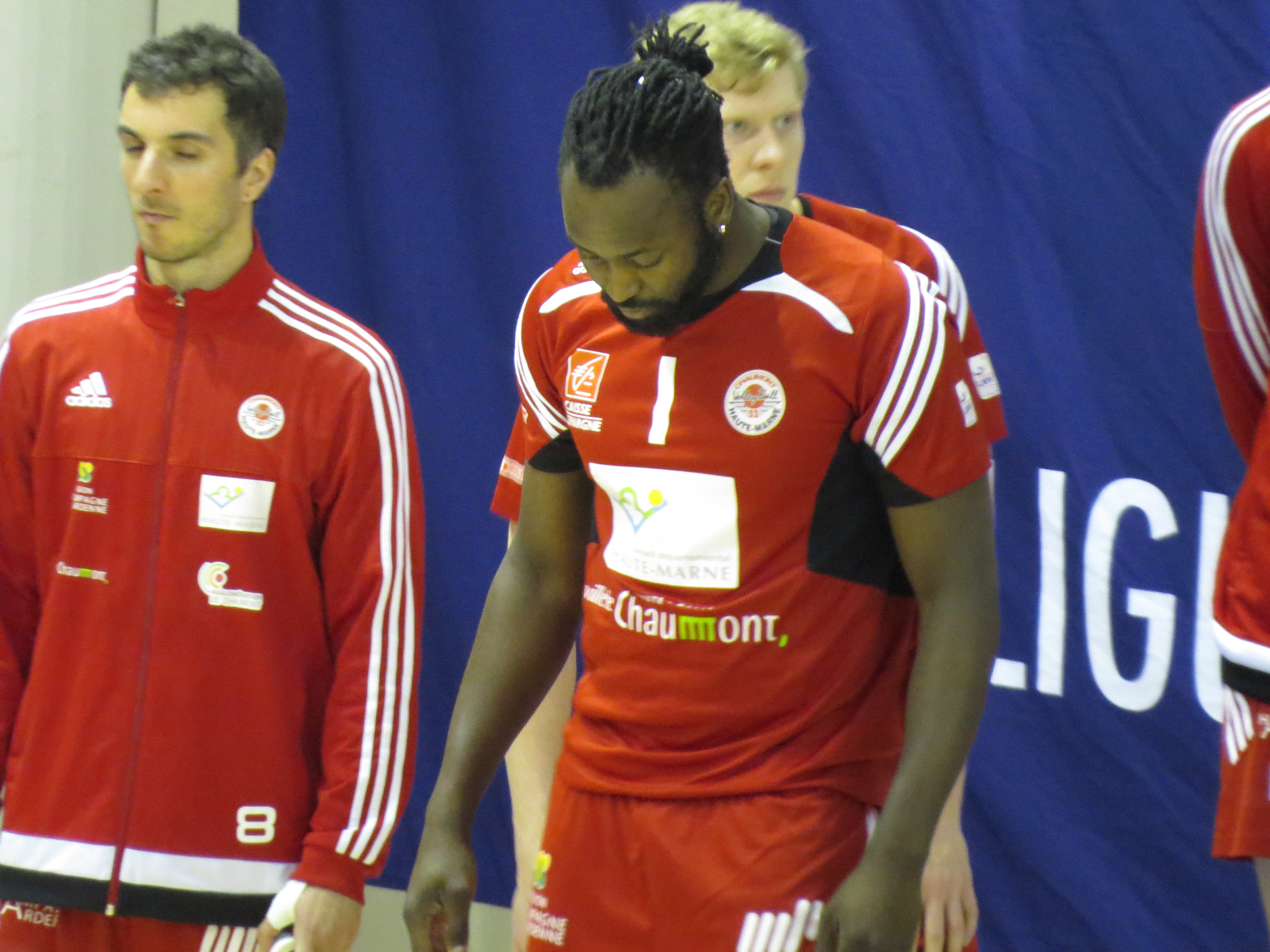

Personal information
- Nationality: French
- Born: 11 June 1988 (age 38)
- Height: 200 cm (6 ft 7 in)
- Weight: 100 kg (220 lb)
- Spike: 355 cm (140 in)
- Block: 330 cm (130 in)

Volleyball information
- Number: 17 (national team)

National team
| 2012 | France |
Honours
Representing France
Men's volleyball
World League
| Bronze medal – third place | 2016 Kraków |

Horacio d'Almeida (born 11 June 1988) is a French male volleyball player. He was part of the France men's national volleyball team.
