= José Monteiro (volleyball) =

Portuguese volleyball player (born 1991)

Personal information
- Nationality: Portuguese
- Born: 21 October 1991 (age 35)
- Height: 180 cm (5 ft 11 in)
- Weight: 70 kg (154 lb)
- Spike: 301 cm (119 in)
- Block: 290 cm (114 in)

Volleyball information
- Number: 22 (national team)

Career
Years	Teams
2015	CA Madalena

National team
2011-	Portugal

José Monteiro (born 21 October 1991) is a Portuguese male volleyball player. He is part of the Portugal men's national volleyball team. On club level he plays for Sporting CP.
