= Max Burt =

Canadian volleyball player (born 1988)

Personal information
- Born: 25 July 1988 (age 38); Gander, Newfoundland and Labrador, Canada
- Height: 207 cm (6 ft 9 in)
- Weight: 101 kg (223 lb)
- Spike: 350 cm (138 in)
- Block: 327 cm (129 in)
- Education: Dalhousie University

Volleyball information
- Position: Middle Blocker
- Current club: (France) ASUL Lyon
- Number: 14 (national team)

Career
Years	Teams
2009–2011; 2012–2013; 2013–2014; 2014–2016; 2016–	(Canada) Dalhousie University (Indonesia) Bank Sumsei Babel (Czech Republic) Pribram VB (France) Nantes Rezé Métropole (France) ASUL Lyon

National team
2012–	Canada

Max Burt (born 25 July 1988) is a Canadian male volleyball player. He is part of the Canada men's national volleyball team. On club level he plays for Nantes Rezé Métropole Volley.
