= Nicolás Bruno =

Argentine volleyball player (born 1989)

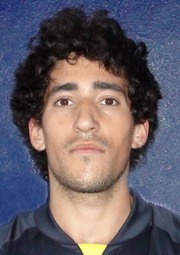
- Bruno in 2013

Personal information
- Nationality: Argentine
- Born: 24 February 1989 (age 37)
- Height: 1.88 m (6 ft 2 in)
- Weight: 84 kg (185 lb)
- Spike: 340 cm (130 in)
- Block: 320 cm (130 in)

Volleyball information
- Number: 30

Career
Years	Teams
2012	(Argentina) Buenos Aires Unidos

National team
2012	Argentina
Honours
Men's volleyball
Representing Argentina
Pan American Games
Gold medal – first place	2019 Lima	Team
Bronze medal – third place	2011 Guadalajara	Team
Pan-American Cup
Gold medal – first place	2017 Gatineau

Nicolás Bruno (born 24 February 1989 in Avellaneda) is an Argentine male volleyball player. He was part of the Argentina men's national volleyball team. Bruno competed with the national team at the 2012 Summer Olympics in London, Great Britain and at the 2016 Olympics in Rio, Brazil. He currently plays for Halkbank Ankara.

== Clubs ==
- (Argentina) Buenos Aires Unidos (2012)

== Individually ==
- 2019 Pan American Games - Most Valuable Player

== See also ==
- Argentina at the 2012 Summer Olympics
