= 2009 Men's NORCECA Volleyball Championship =

Edition of the Men's Continental Volleyball Tournament

2009 Men’s NORCECA Championship

Tournament details
- Host country: Puerto Rico
- Dates: 12–17 October
- Teams: 7
- Venue: 1 (in 1 host city)

Final positions
- Champions: Cuba (14th title)

Tournament awards
- MVP: (Cuba) Wilfredo León

The 2009 Men's NORCECA Volleyball Championship was the 21st edition of the Men's Continental Volleyball Tournament, played from October 12 to October 17 at the Coliseo Rubén Rodríguez in Bayamón, Puerto Rico. The winner qualified for the 2009 FIVB Men's World Grand Champions Cup in Japan.

== Teams ==
| Pool A | Pool B |
|---|---|
| Puerto Rico; Cuba; Dominican Republic; Barbados | United States; Canada; Mexico; Panama |

== Preliminary round ==
=== Pool A ===
| Pos | Team | Pld | W | L | Pts | SW | SL | SR | SPW | SPL | SPR | Qualification |
|---|---|---|---|---|---|---|---|---|---|---|---|---|
| 1 | Cuba | 3 | 3 | 0 | 6 | 9 | 0 | MAX | 225 | 146 | 1.541 | Semifinals |
| 2 | Puerto Rico | 3 | 2 | 1 | 5 | 6 | 3 | 2.000 | 213 | 175 | 1.217 | Quarterfinals |
| 3 | Dominican Republic | 3 | 1 | 2 | 4 | 3 | 6 | 0.500 | 178 | 201 | 0.886 | Quarterfinals |
| 4 | Barbados | 3 | 0 | 3 | 3 | 0 | 9 | 0.000 | 131 | 225 | 0.582 | |

| Date | | Score | | Set 1 | Set 2 | Set 3 | Set 4 | Set 5 | Total |
|---|---|---|---|---|---|---|---|---|---|
| Oct 12 | Cuba | 3–0 | Dominican Republic | 25–17 | 25–15 | 25–14 | | | 75–46 |
| Oct 12 | Puerto Rico | 3–0 | Barbados | 25–9 | 25–16 | 25–18 | | | 75–43 |
| Oct 13 | Barbados | 0–3 | Cuba | 10–25 | 11–25 | 16–25 | | | 37–75 |
| Oct 13 | Dominican Republic | 0–3 | Puerto Rico | 18–25 | 20–25 | 19–25 | | | 57–75 |
| Oct 14 | Dominican Republic | 3–0 | Barbados | 25–18 | 25–18 | 25–15 | | | 75–51 |
| Oct 14 | Puerto Rico | 0–3 | Cuba | 21–25 | 22–25 | 20–25 | | | 63–75 |

=== Pool B ===
| Pos | Team | Pld | W | L | Pts | SW | SL | SR | SPW | SPL | SPR | Qualification |
|---|---|---|---|---|---|---|---|---|---|---|---|---|
| 1 | United States | 3 | 3 | 0 | 6 | 9 | 1 | 9.000 | 249 | 178 | 1.399 | Semifinals |
| 2 | Canada | 3 | 2 | 1 | 5 | 7 | 4 | 1.750 | 257 | 228 | 1.127 | Quarterfinals |
| 3 | Mexico | 3 | 1 | 2 | 4 | 4 | 6 | 0.667 | 209 | 229 | 0.913 | Quarterfinals |
| 4 | Panama | 3 | 0 | 3 | 3 | 0 | 9 | 0.000 | 145 | 225 | 0.644 | |

| Date | | Score | | Set 1 | Set 2 | Set 3 | Set 4 | Set 5 | Total |
|---|---|---|---|---|---|---|---|---|---|
| Oct 12 | United States | 3–0 | Mexico | 25–15 | 28–26 | 25–16 | | | 78–57 |
| Oct 12 | Canada | 3–0 | Panama | 25–13 | 25–23 | 25–19 | | | 75–55 |
| Oct 13 | Mexico | 1–3 | Canada | 25–21 | 16–25 | 24–26 | 12–25 | | 77–97 |
| Oct 13 | Panama | 0–3 | United States | 13–25 | 15–25 | 8–25 | | | 36–75 |
| Oct 14 | Mexico | 3–0 | Panama | 25–19 | 25–14 | 25–21 | | | 75–54 |
| Oct 14 | United States | 3–1 | Canada | 21–25 | 25–17 | 25–22 | 25–21 | | 96–85 |

== Final round ==
=== Championship bracket ===
Quarterfinals
October 15 – Bayamón
Canada | 3
Dominican Republic | 2
October 15 – Bayamón
Puerto Rico | 3
Mexico | 0

Semifinals
October 16 – Bayamón
Cuba | 3
Canada | 0
October 16 – Bayamón
United States | 3
Puerto Rico | 0

Final
October 17 – Bayamón
Cuba | 3
United States | 1
3rd place
October 17 – Bayamón
Canada | 2
Puerto Rico | 3

=== 5th–8th places bracket ===
5th–8th places
October 16 – Bayamón
Barbados | 1
Mexico | 3
October 16 – Bayamón
Panama | 0
Dominican Republic | 3

5th place
October 17 – Bayamón
Mexico | 3
Dominican Republic | 2
7th place
October 17 – Bayamón
Barbados | 3
Panama | 1

=== Quarterfinals ===
| Date | | Score | | Set 1 | Set 2 | Set 3 | Set 4 | Set 5 | Total |
|---|---|---|---|---|---|---|---|---|---|
| Oct 15 | Canada | 3–2 | Dominican Republic | 21–25 | 25–22 | 21–25 | 25–23 | 15–13 | 107–108 |
| Oct 15 | Puerto Rico | 3–0 | Mexico | 25–15 | 25–17 | 25–20 | | | 75–52 |

=== 5th–8th places ===
| Date | | Score | | Set 1 | Set 2 | Set 3 | Set 4 | Set 5 | Total |
|---|---|---|---|---|---|---|---|---|---|
| Oct 16 | Barbados | 1–3 | Mexico | 25–21 | 18–25 | 19–25 | 27–29 | | 89–100 |
| Oct 16 | Panama | 0–3 | Dominican Republic | 19–25 | 18–25 | 22–25 | | | 59–75 |

=== Semifinals ===
| Date | | Score | | Set 1 | Set 2 | Set 3 | Set 4 | Set 5 | Total |
|---|---|---|---|---|---|---|---|---|---|
| Oct 16 | Cuba | 3–0 | Canada | 25–22 | 25–16 | 25–21 | | | 75–59 |
| Oct 16 | United States | 3–0 | Puerto Rico | 25–16 | 25–23 | 25–22 | | | 75–61 |

=== 7th place ===
| Date | | Score | | Set 1 | Set 2 | Set 3 | Set 4 | Set 5 | Total |
|---|---|---|---|---|---|---|---|---|---|
| Oct 17 | Barbados | 3–1 | Panama | 20–25 | 25–16 | 25–19 | 25–15 | | 95–75 |

=== 5th place ===
| Date | | Score | | Set 1 | Set 2 | Set 3 | Set 4 | Set 5 | Total |
|---|---|---|---|---|---|---|---|---|---|
| Oct 17 | Mexico | 3–2 | Dominican Republic | 25–19 | 18–25 | 21–25 | 25–20 | 15–13 | 104–102 |

=== 3rd place ===
| Date | | Score | | Set 1 | Set 2 | Set 3 | Set 4 | Set 5 | Total |
|---|---|---|---|---|---|---|---|---|---|
| Oct 17 | Canada | 2–3 | Puerto Rico | 16–25 | 26–24 | 20–25 | 25–22 | 9–15 | 96–111 |

=== Final ===
| Date | | Score | | Set 1 | Set 2 | Set 3 | Set 4 | Set 5 | Total |
|---|---|---|---|---|---|---|---|---|---|
| Oct 17 | Cuba | 3–1 | United States | 25–21 | 22–25 | 25–21 | 25–22 | | 97–89 |

== Final standing ==
| Rank | Team |
|---|---|
| 1st place, gold medalist(s) | Cuba |
| 2nd place, silver medalist(s) | United States |
| 3rd place, bronze medalist(s) | Puerto Rico |
| 4 | Canada |
| 5 | Mexico |
| 6 | Dominican Republic |
| 7 | Barbados |
| 8 | Panama |

2009 Men's NORCECA champions

Cuba
14th title

== Awards ==
- MVP: (Cuba) Wilfredo León
- Best scorer: (Dominican Republic) José Miguel Cáceres
- Best spiker: (Cuba) Wilfredo León
- Best blocker: (Cuba) Robertlandy Simón
- Best server: (United States) Evan Patak
- Best digger: (Puerto Rico) Gregory Berrios
- Best setter: (Cuba) Raydel Hierrezuelo
- Best receiver: (Puerto Rico) Gregory Berrios
- Best libero: (Puerto Rico) Gregory Berrios
- Rising Star: (Cuba) Wilfredo León
- Jim Coleman Award: (Cuba) Orlando Samuels
