= Leandro Macías =

Cuban volleyball player (born 1990)

Personal information
- Full name: Leandro Macías Infante
- Nationality: Cuban
- Born: 13 February 1990 (age 36)
- Height: 1.92 m (6 ft 4 in)
- Weight: 70 kg (154 lb)
- Spike: 325 cm (128 in)
- Block: 318 cm (125 in)

Volleyball information
- Number: 5

Career
Years	Teams
2014	Santiago de Cuba

National team
2014	Cuba
Honours
U21 World Championship
Silver medal – second place	2009 India

Leandro Macías Infante (born 13 February 1990) is a Cuban male volleyball player. He was part of the Cuba men's national volleyball team at the 2014 FIVB Volleyball Men's World Championship in Poland. He played for Santiago de Cuba.

== Clubs ==
- Santiago de Cuba (2014)
