= Marcus Popp =

German volleyball player (born 1981)

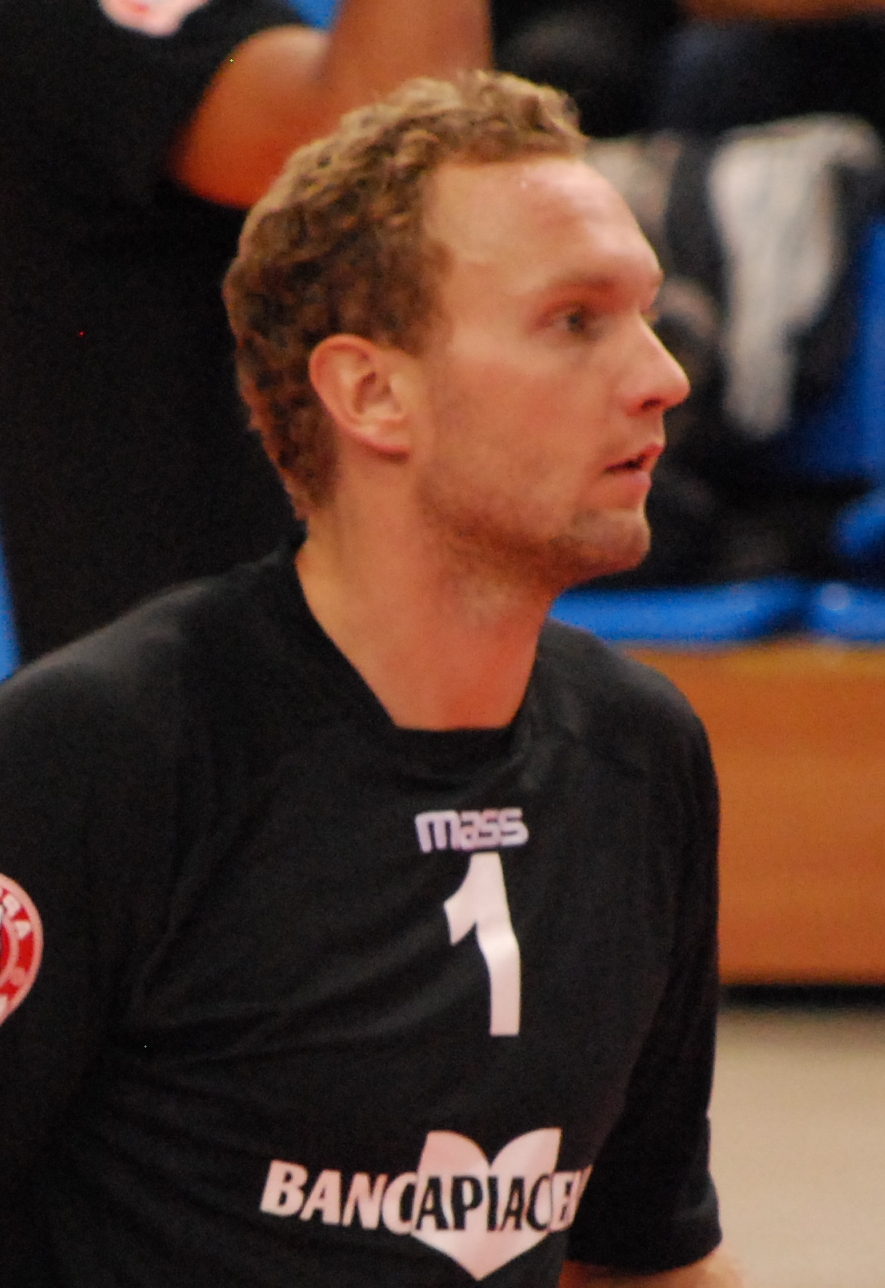

Personal information
- Born: 23 September 1981 (age 45); Flöha, East Germany
- Height: 1.92 m (6 ft 3 1/2 in)
- Weight: 83 kg (183 lb)

Volleyball information
- Current club: Copra Piacenza

National team
2005-	Germany

Marcus Popp (born 23 September 1981 in Flöha) is a German volleyball player.
