= Kim Hak-min =

South Korean volleyball player (born 1983)

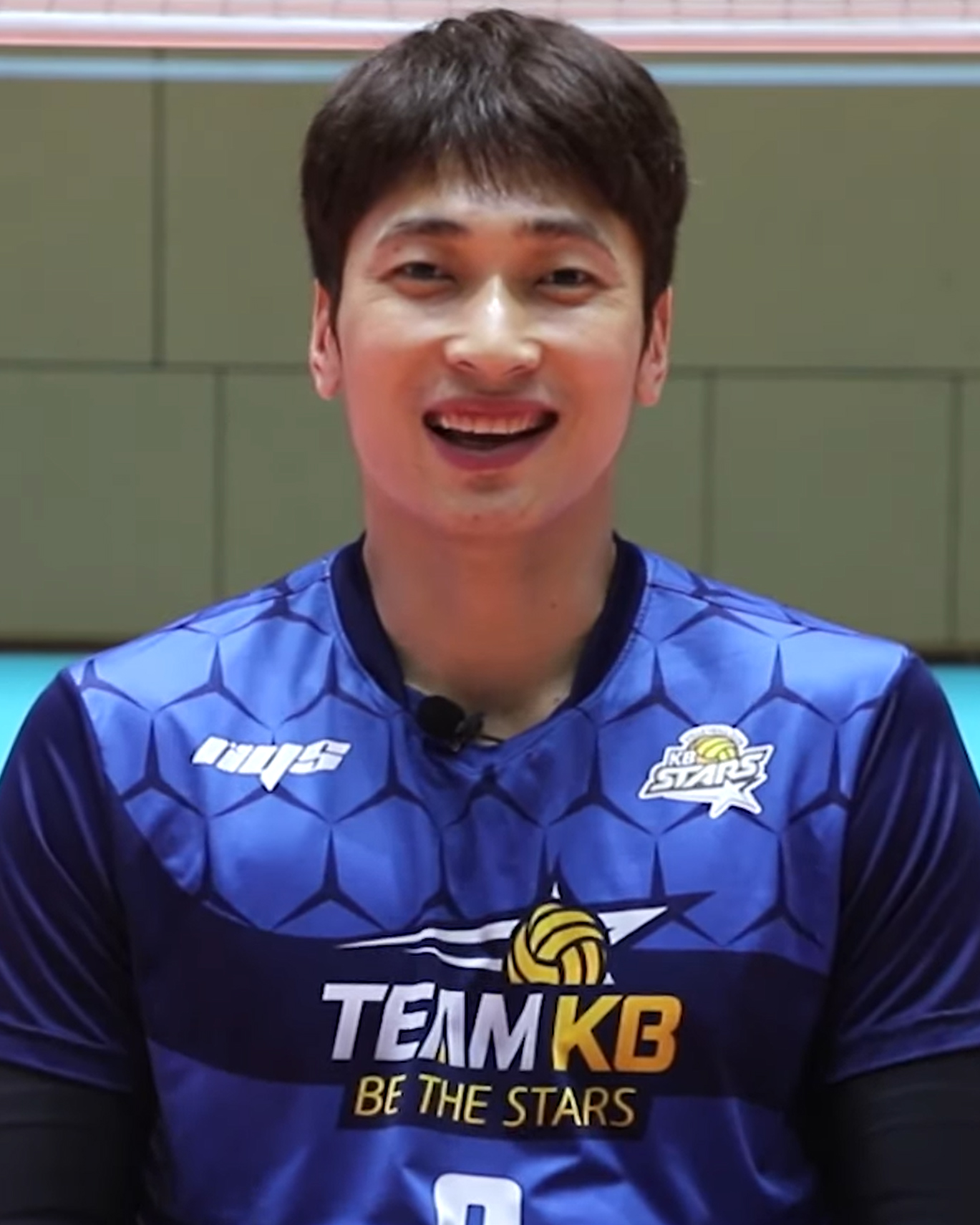
- Kim in 2019

Personal information
- Nationality: South Korean
- Born: 4 September 1983 (age 43); Suwon, South Korea
- Height: 193 cm (6 ft 4 in)
- Weight: 81 kg (179 lb)
- Spike: 327 cm (129 in)
- Block: 319 cm (126 in)
- Education: Kyung Hee University

Volleyball information
- Position: Outside hitter
- Current club: KB Insurance Stars
- Number: 8

Career
Years	Teams
2006–2019; 2019–	Korean Air Jumbos; KB Insurance Stars

National team
2006–2016	South Korea
Honours
Asian Games
Bronze medal – third place	2010 Guangzhou
- Last updated: 9 February 2018

Kim Hak-min (Korean: 김학민; born 4 September 1983) is a South Korean male volleyball player. He currently plays for the Uijeongbu KB Insurance Stars.
