= Stefano Patriarca =

Italian volleyball player

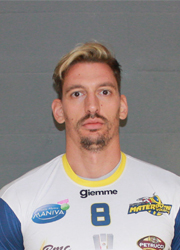

Personal information
- Nationality: Italian
- Born: July 23, 1987 (age 39); Agnone
- Height: 6 ft 9 in (2.07 m)
- Weight: 229 lb (104 kg)
- Spike: 136 in (345 cm)
- Block: 128 in (324 cm)

Volleyball information
- Position: Middle blocker
- Current club: (Italy) BCC Castellana Grotte

Career
Years	Teams
2005-2007; 2007-2008; 2008-2010; 2010-2011; 2011-2012; 2012-2013; 2013-2014; 2014-2015; 2015-2016; 2016-2017; 2017-2020; 2020-	(Italy) Lube Banca Marche Macerata (Italy) Codyeco Santa Croce (Italy) Samgas Crema (Italy) BCC-NEP Castellana Grotte (Italy) Marmi Lanza Verona (Italy) Andreoli Latina (Italy) Cucine Lube Banca Marche Macerata (Italy) Revivre Milano (Italy) LPR Piacenza (Italy) Emma Villas Siena (Italy) Materdominivolley.it Castellana Grotte (Italy) BCC Castellana Grotte

Stefano Patriarca (born July 23, 1987) is an Italian volleyball player, playing in position middle blocker. Since the 2020/2021 season, he has played for BCC Castellana Grotte.

== Sporting achievements ==
=== Clubs ===
CEV Challenge Cup:

- 2006

Italian Championship:

- 2006, 2014

Italian SuperCup:

- 2006

CEV Cup:

- 2013

=== National team ===
Boys' U19 World Championship:

- 2005
