= Toafa Takaniko =

French volleyball player (born 1985)

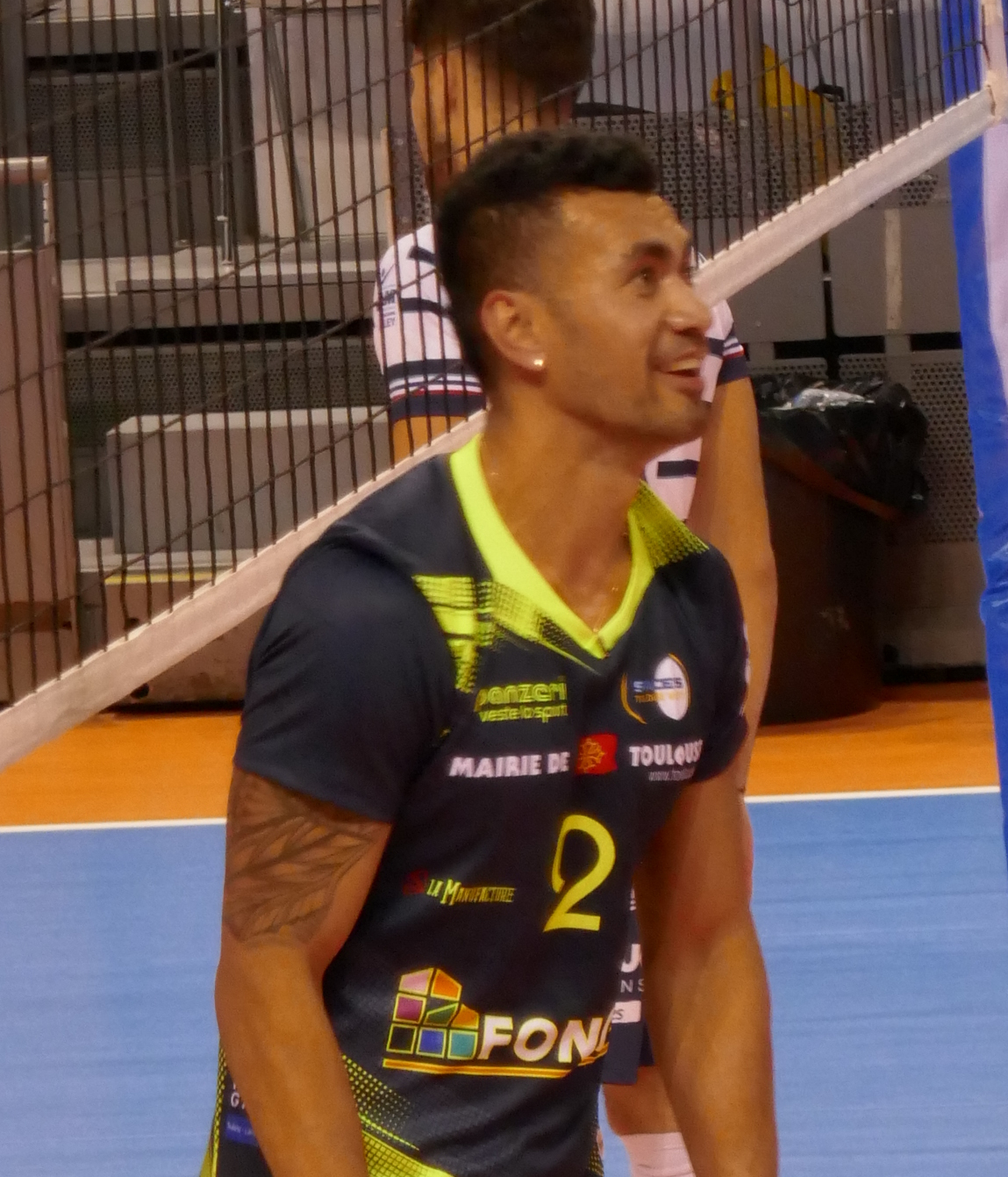
- Takaniko in 2019

Personal information
- Nationality: French
- Born: 29 May 1985 (age 41) Futuna, France
- Height: 1.92 m (6 ft 4 in)
- Weight: 88 kg (194 lb)
- Spike: 340 cm (134 in)
- Block: 330 cm (130 in)

Volleyball information
- Position: Setter
- Current club: GFC Ajaccio VB
- Number: 2

Career
- Years: Team
- 2005–2007 2007–2008 2008–2010 2010–2012 2012–2013 2013–2015 2015–: AS Cannes Volley-Ball; Asnieres Volley 92; Spacer's de Toulouse; AS Cannes Volley-Ball; Nantes Rezé Métropole; Arago de Sète; GFC Ajaccio VB

National team
- Years: Team
- –: France
Honours
Men's volleyball
Representing France
European Championship
Silver medal – second place	2009 Turkey
Mediterranean Games
Bronze medal – third place	2013 Turkey
- Updated on 1 January 2018

Toafa Takaniko (born 29 May 1985) is a French male volleyball player. He is part of the France men's national volleyball team. On club level he plays for Arago de Sète.
