= Lazaro Fundora =

Cuban volleyball player (born 1994)

Lázaro Raydel Fundora Travieso

Personal information
- Nationality: Cuban
- Born: 13 February 1994 (age 32)
- Height: 195 cm (6 ft 5 in)
- Weight: 90 kg (198 lb)
- Spike: 344 cm (135 in)
- Block: 317 cm (125 in)

Volleyball information
- Current club: Vojvodina

Career
Years	Teams
2015-2017; 2017-2018; 2018-	La Habana; Malatya Buyuksehir Belediyesi; Vojvodina

National team
2014-	Cuba
Honours
U19 World Championship
Bronze medal – third place	2011 Argentina

Lázaro Raydel Fundora Travieso (born 13 February 1994) is a Cuban male volleyball player who plays for Serbian team Vojvodina. He is part of the Cuba men's national volleyball team.
