= Baptiste Geiler =

French volleyball player (born 1987)

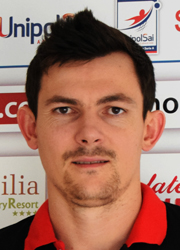
- Geiler in 2016

Personal information
- Nickname: Batou
- Nationality: French
- Born: 12 March 1987 (age 39); Montpellier, France
- Height: 1.98 m (6 ft 6 in)
- Weight: 83 kg (183 lb)
- Spike: 335 cm (132 in)
- Block: 313 cm (123 in)

Volleyball information
- Position: Outside hitter
- Current club: Stade Poitevin Poitiers
- Number: 4

Career
Years	Teams
2004–2007; 2007–2009; 2009–2013; 2013–2016; 2016–2017; 2017; 2017–	CVNB; Montpellier UC; Arago de Sète; VfB Friedrichshafen; Tonno Callipo Vibo Valentia; El Jaish SC; Stade Poitevin Poitiers

National team
2009–	France
Honours
Men's volleyball
Representing France
European Championship
Silver medal – second place	2009 Turkey
Mediterranean Games
Bronze medal – third place	2013 Turkey
- Last updated: 2 January 2018

Baptiste Geiler (born 12 March 1987) is a former French male volleyball player. He was part of the France men's national volleyball team. On club level he played for Friedrichshafen.
