= Pasi Hyvärinen =

Finnish volleyball player (born 1987)

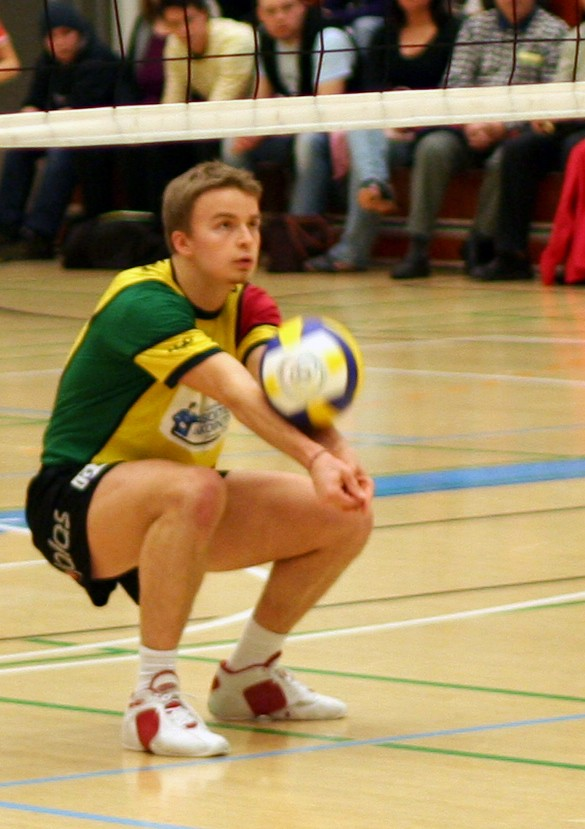

Personal information
- Full name: Pasi Hyvärinen
- Born: 22 November 1987 (age 38) Varkaus, Finland
- Height: 1.84 m (6 ft 0 in)

Volleyball information
- Position: libero
- Current club: GFCO Ajaccio

Career
- Years: Team
- 2005–2007: Keski-Savon Pateri
- 2007–2009: Muuramen Lentopallo
- 2011: Kyyjärven Kyky

National team
- Years: Team
- 3 years: Finland

Pasi Hyvärinen (born 22 November 1987) is a volleyball player from Finland. He has played for Muuramen Lentopallo and Keski-Savon Pateri in the Finnish Championship league. For Season 2010–2011 he joined the GFCO Ajaccio team in French Ligue A. Hyvärinen is a member of Finland men's national volleyball team.

== Career ==
Hyvärinen started his career in Varkaus. When he was Sixteen years old, he moved to Kuortane and attended to a high school specialised to sports. That year he also started to train with Finnish national juniors. He only lived and played in Kuortane for one year, before moving back to Varkaus where he started to play in Keski-Savon Pateri. Hyvärinen played two seasons for Pateri. After these two seasons he signed a contract with Muuramen Lentopallo. He play for Muurle in seasons 2008–2010.

After season 2010 Hyvärinen said that he does not want anymore play in Muurle, because he did not like the clubs acting. Many fans were afraid of that Hyvärinen ends his career and it was close. Hyvärinen started play badminton and he joined in the few tournaments. Likely he got contract from France and played great season in France league.

Season 2011–12 Hyvärinen did not get a contract to foreign team. He did not play in open season but after many months he made contract in 1. division team Kyyjärven Kyky which is playing the second highest level in Finnish league. Hyvärinen plays as wing spiker in KyKy.

== National team ==
Hyvärinen plays also for Finland national team. His rise to the national team was a sum of many things. Team Finlands coach Mauro Berruto did not invite him to the camp of the National team in Kuortane. When national team was training in Kuortane, Hyvärinen was also in there because he was in search for sport director school in Kuortane. Hyvärinen heard that the national team was training there, so he decide to call coach Berruto and asked from him is it was possible to start training with the team. Berruto accepted the proposition and Hyvärinen came to trainings. After the first time he attended in the team training, Berruto was really excited about his natural talent. He wanted him to the team full-time, and that was how his National career started.

Hyvärinen's first appearance in a Finnish national team was against Bulgaria World League 2008. He was the best player of the game. After that media was highly excited about him and praised Hyvärinen to be a sensation. Pasi played for the team last six World League games, and Finland won four from those. He had the best reception in the whole World League.

== Beach volley ==
Pasi Hyvärinen has also played actively beach volley for many years. His best result in beach volley is U-19 European Championships 5th place. His other achievements are 9th place in U-21 European Championships and 9th place in U-23 European Championships. In those competitions Hyvärinen was a few years younger than most other players. He has also won silver and bronze in Finnish Championships respectively in 2007 and 2006.

== Achievements ==
=== Personal ===
- Best reception in World League 2008
- Finland national team
- Finland juniors Champion 2007, 2008

=== Beach volley ===
- U-19 European Championships 5. place
- U-21 European Championships 9. place
- U-23 European Championships 9. place
- Finland Pro-Tour silver 2006
- Finland Pro-Tour bronze 2007

== Teams ==
- 2005–2007 Keski-Savon Pateri
- 2007–2010 Muuramen Lentopallo
- 2010–2011 GFCO Ajaccio
