= Federico Martina =

Argentine volleyball player (born 1992)

Personal information
- Nationality: Argentine
- Born: 2 November 1992 (age 33)
- Height: 202 cm (6 ft 8 in)
- Weight: 92 kg (203 lb)
- Spike: 350 cm (138 in)
- Block: 320 cm (126 in)

Volleyball information
- Number: 12 (national team)

Career
Years	Teams
2015	Ciudad de Buenos Aires

National team
2015	Argentina

Federico Martina (born 2 November 1992) is an Argentine male volleyball player. He is part of the Argentina men's national volleyball team. At club level he plays for Ciudad de Buenos Aires.
