= Iván Castellani =

Argentine volleyball player (born 1991)

Personal information
- Full name: Iván Castellani
- Nationality: Italian; Argentine
- Born: January 19, 1991 (age 35); Padua, Italy
- Hometown: Buenos Aires, Argentina
- Height: 1.96 m (6 ft 5 in)
- Weight: 82 kg (181 lb)

Volleyball information
- Position: Outside hitter/Opposite
- Current club: (Italy) Pallavolo Molfetta

Career
Years	Teams
2009–2010; 2010–2012; 2012–2013; 2013–2013; 2014–	(Argentina) UPCN San Juan (Argentina) Club Ciudad de Bolívar (Argentina) PSM Vóley (France) Montpellier UC (Italy) Pallavolo Molfetta

National team
2010–	Argentina
Honours
Representing Argentina
Men's Volleyball
Pan American Games
Bronze medal – third place	2011 Mexico
- Last updated: 26 May 2015

Iván Castellani (born 19 January 1991) is an Argentine volleyball player. A member of the Argentina men's national volleyball team, he was a participant at the 2012 Summer Olympics in London.

== Career ==
He played for Montpellier UC for only a few months because he was unhappy with the coaching staff. In January 2014, he moved to the Italian team Pallavolo Molfetta.

== Sporting achievements ==
=== National team ===
- 2010 Pan-American Cup
- 2011 Pan American Games
