= Denny Hernández =

Cuban volleyball player (born 1994)

Personal information
- Full name: Denny de Jesús Hernández Martínez
- Nationality: Cuban
- Born: 24 February 1994 (age 32)
- Height: 190 cm (6 ft 3 in)
- Weight: 85 kg (187 lb)
- Spike: 344 cm (135 in)
- Block: 321 cm (126 in)

Career
Years	Teams
2015	Pinar Del Rio

National team
2011-	Cuba

Denny de Jesús Hernández Martínez (born 24 February 1994) is a Cuban male volleyball player. He is part of the Cuba men's national volleyball team. On club level he plays for Pinar Del Rio.
