= Wallace Martins =

Brazilian volleyball player (born 1983)

Personal information
- Full name: Wallace Jansen de Souza Martins
- Nationality: Brazilian
- Born: 22 March 1983 (age 43)
- Height: 204 cm (6 ft 8 in)
- Weight: 100 kg (220 lb)
- Spike: 344 cm (135 in)
- Block: 318 cm (125 in)

Volleyball information
- Position: outside hitter
- Number: 18

Career
- Years: Team
- 2011: SESI-SP

National team
- Years: Team
- 2011: Brazil
Honours
Men's volleyball
Representing Brazil
Pan American Games
Gold medal – first place	2011 Guadalajara	Team
South American Championship
Gold medal – first place	2011 Cuiabá	Team

Wallace Jansen de Souza Martins (born 22 March 1983) is a Brazilian male volleyball player. With his club SESI-SP he competed at the 2011 FIVB Volleyball Men's Club World Championship.
