= Christian Dünnes =

German volleyball player (born 1984)

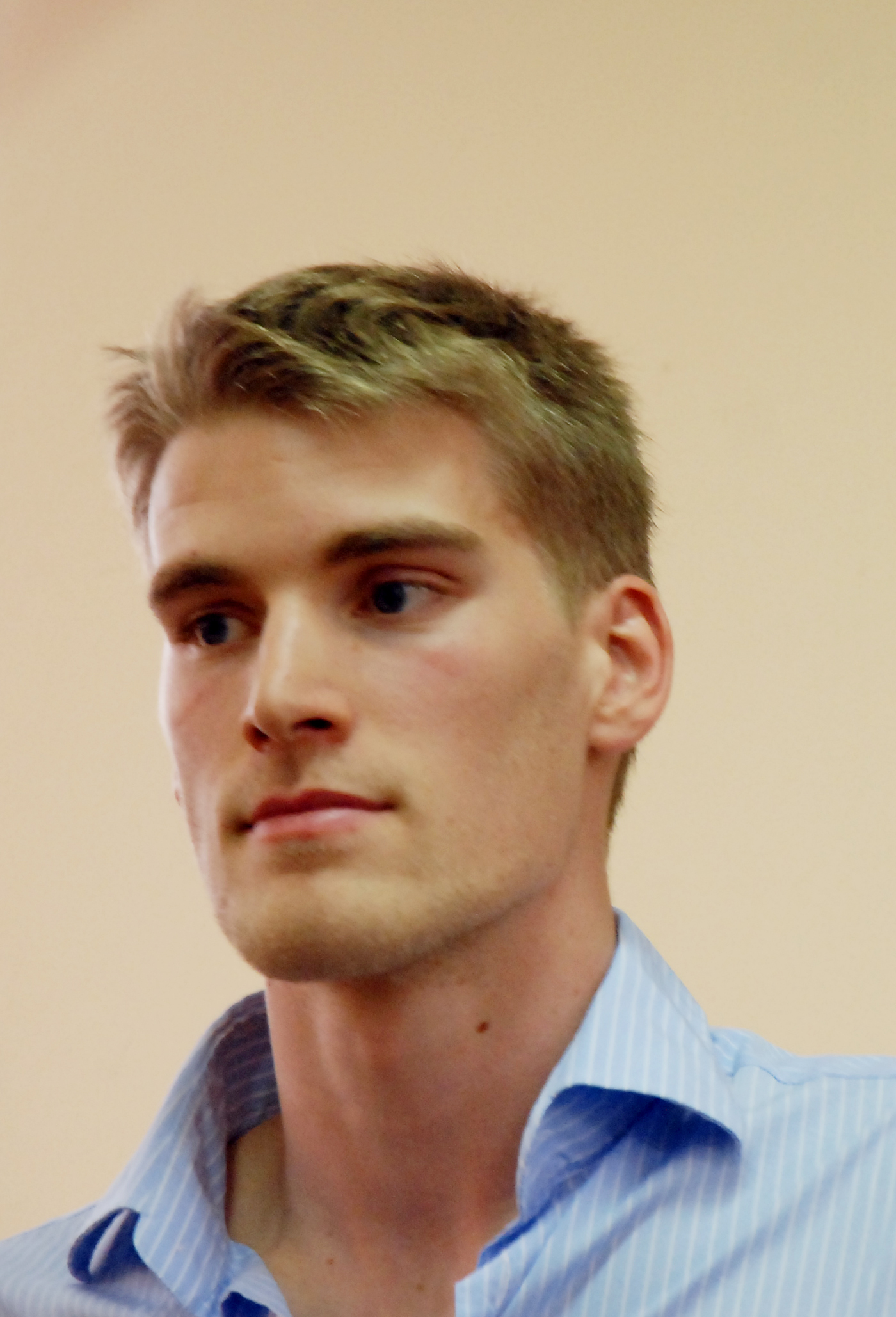

Personal information
- Born: 16 June 1984 (age 42); Siegen, West Germany
- Height: 2.10 m (6 ft 11 in)
- Weight: 105 kg (231 lb)

National team
2006–2016	Germany

Christian Dünnes (born 16 June 1984) is a German former volleyball player, who represented Germany at the 2012 Summer Olympics.
