= Mário da Silva Pedreira Júnior =

Brazilian volleyball player (born 1982)

Mario da Silva Pedreira
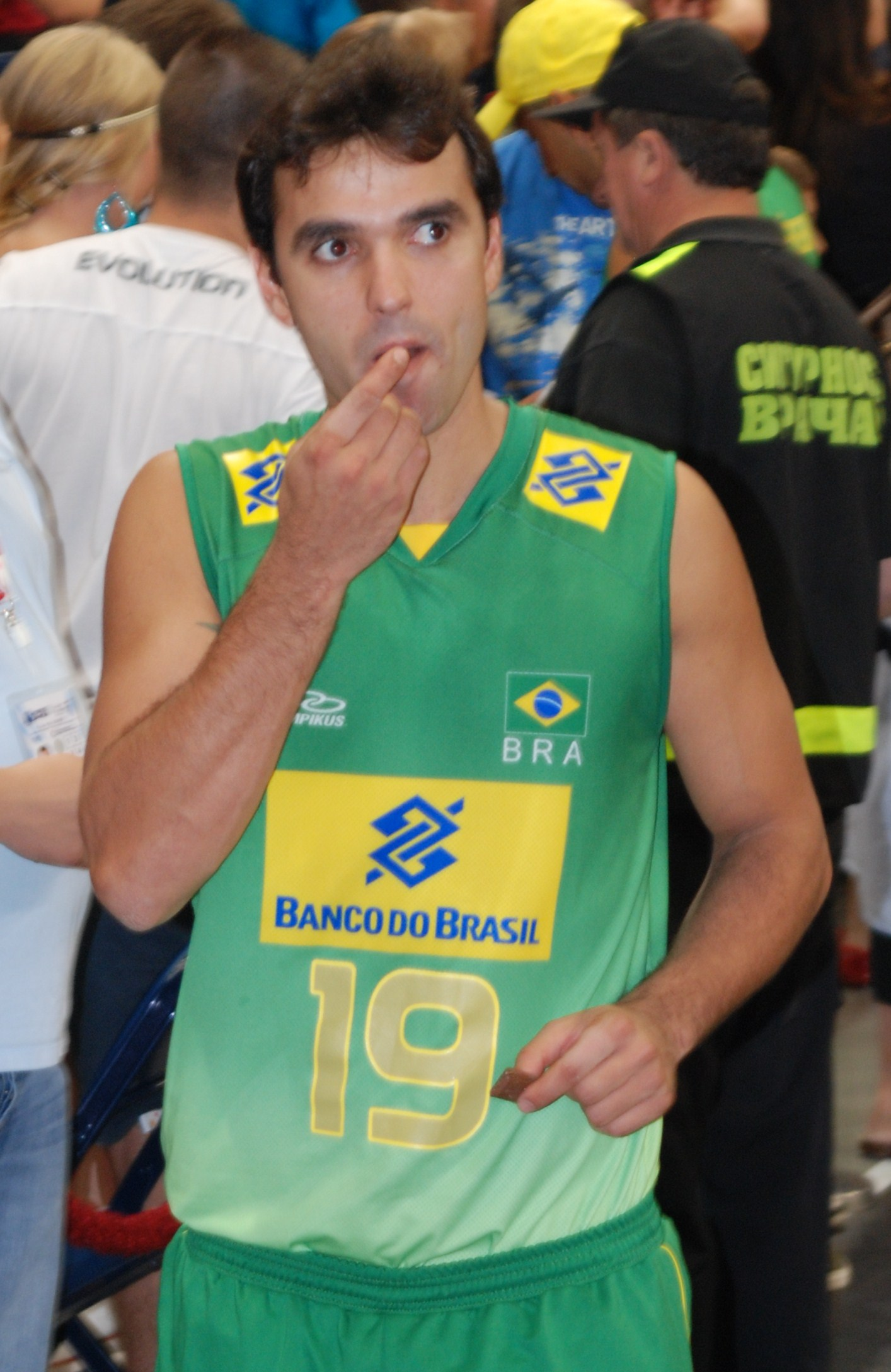

Personal information
- Full name: Mario da Silva Pedreira Junior
- Nickname: Mario Junior
- Born: 3 May 1982 (age 44); Rio de Janeiro, Brazil
- Height: 1.92 m (6 ft 4 in)
- Weight: 91 kg (201 lb)
- Spike: 330 cm (130 in)
- Block: 321 cm (126 in)

Volleyball information
- Position: Libero

Career
Years	Teams
2002–2002	Unincor/Três Corações
2002–2003	Club Vigo Voleibol
2003–2004	Tarragona SPSP
2004–2005	Tenerife Sur Voleibol
2005–2006	Ulbra/Canoas
2006–2007	EC Unisul
2007–2010	Cimed Florianópolis
2010–2012	Vôlei Futuro
2012–2014	RJX
2014–2015	Volley Piacenza
2015–2016	São José Vôlei
2016–2017	Funvic Taubaté
2017–2018	Botafogo
2018–2019	Maringá Vôlei

National team
2009–2015	Brazil
Honours
Men's volleyball
Representing Brazil
World Championship
Gold medal – first place	2010 Italy	Team
Silver medal – second place	2014 Poland	Team
World Grand Champions Cup
Gold medal – first place	2013 Japan	Team
World League
Gold medal – first place	2009 Belgrade	Team
Gold medal – first place	2010 Córdoba	Team
Silver medal – second place	2011 Gdańsk	Team
Silver medal – second place	2013 Mar del Plata	Team
Silver medal – second place	2014 Florence	Team
Pan American Games
Gold medal – first place	2011 Guadalajara	Team
South American Championship
Gold medal – first place	2013 Cabo Frio

Mario da Silva Pedreira Junior (born 3 May 1982) is a Brazilian male volleyball player. He was part of the Brazil men's national volleyball team at the 2010 FIVB Volleyball Men's World Championship in Italy. He played for Volley Piacenza. Mario in World League 2010 and Word League 2013 won Best Libero Award.

== Clubs ==
- Volley Piacenza (2010)

== Sporting achievements ==
=== Individuals ===
- 2010 FIVB World League – "Best Libero"
- 2011 Pan American Games – "Best Receiver"
- 2013 FIVB World League – "Best Libero"
- 2013 South American Championship – "Best Libero"
