= Raydel Hierrezuelo =

Cuban volleyball player (born 1987)

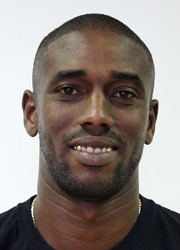
- Raydel Hierrezuelo – Cuban volleyball player, 2016

Personal information
- Born: 14 July 1987 (age 39); Havana, Cuba
- Height: 1.96 m (6 ft 5 in)
- Weight: 87 kg (192 lb)
- Spike: 340 cm (134 in)
- Block: 335 cm (132 in)

Volleyball information
- Position: Setter

Career
| Years | Teams |
|---|---|
| 2011–2013; 2013–2014; 2014–2016; 2016–2017; 2017–2018; 2018–2019; 2019–2020; 2020–2021; 2021–2023; 2023–2024 | (Cuba) La Habana (Indonesia) Surabaya BIN Samator (Italy) Exprivia Molfetta (Italy) Volley Piacenza (Turkey) Halkbank Ankara (Argentina) Bolívar Voley (Turkey) Ziraat Bankası Ankara (Italy) Gas Sales Piacenza (Greece) Foinikas Syros (Greece) Panathinaikos |
Honours
Men's volleyball
Representing Cuba
FIVB World Championship
| Silver medal – second place | 2010 Italy | Team |
World Grand Champions Cup
| Silver medal – second place | 2009 Japan | Team |
America's Cup
| Gold medal – first place | 2008 Cuiaba | Team |
| Bronze medal – third place | 2007 Manaus | Team |
NORCECA Championship
| Gold medal – first place | 2009 Bayamòn | Team |
| Bronze medal – third place | 2007 Anaheim | Team |
Pan American Games
| Silver medal – second place | 2011 Guadalajara | Team |
| Bronze medal – third place | 2007 Rio de Janeiro | Team |

Raydel Hierrezuelo Aguirre (born 14 July 1987, in Havana) is a volleyball player from Cuba.

Hierrezuelo won a silver medal with the Cuban men's national volleyball team at the 2010 FIVB World Championship. With the national team, he has appeared in four World League tournaments (2007–2010). In 2009, he received the award of the best player of the championship.
