= Henry Bell Cisnero =

Cuban volleyball player (born 1982)

Henry Bell

Personal information
- Full name: Henry Bell Cisnero
- Born: July 27, 1982 (age 44); Cuba
- Height: 1.88 m (6 ft 2 in)
- Weight: 84 kg (185 lb)
- Spike: 358 cm (141 in)
- Block: 328 cm (129 in)

Volleyball information
- Position: Spiker
- Current club: Hapoel Menashe Emek Hefer
- Number: 12

Career
Years	Teams
2013-present 2022-	Galatasaray; Hyderabad Black Hawks
Honours
Men's volleyball
Representing Cuba
Pan American Games
Silver medal – second place	2011 Guadalajara	Team

Henry Bell Cisnero (Spanish: Yenry Bell Cisnero; born July 27, 1982, in Cuba) is a Cuban volleyball player. He is 188 cm and plays as spiker. He plays for Maccabi Tel Aviv He was part of the Cuba men's national volleyball team at the 2010 FIVB Volleyball Men's World Championship in Italy. He played for Santiago de Cuba in 2010.
