= Maximiliano Gauna =

Argentine volleyball player (born 1989)

Personal information
- Nationality: Argentine
- Born: 20 April 1989 (age 37)
- Height: 197 cm (6 ft 6 in)
- Weight: 93 kg (205 lb)
- Spike: 338 cm (133 in)
- Block: 320 cm (126 in)

Volleyball information
- Number: 19 (national team)

Career
Years	Teams
2015	Friedrichshafen Club

National team
2015	Argentina
Honours
Men's volleyball
Representing Argentina
Pan American Games
Bronze medal – third place	2011 Guadalajara	Team
Gold medal – first place	2015 Toronto	Team

Maximiliano Gauna (born 20 April 1989) is an Argentine volleyball player. He is part of the Argentina men's national volleyball team. At club level he plays for Friedrichshafen Club.
