= Wilfredo León =

Polish volleyball player (born 1993)

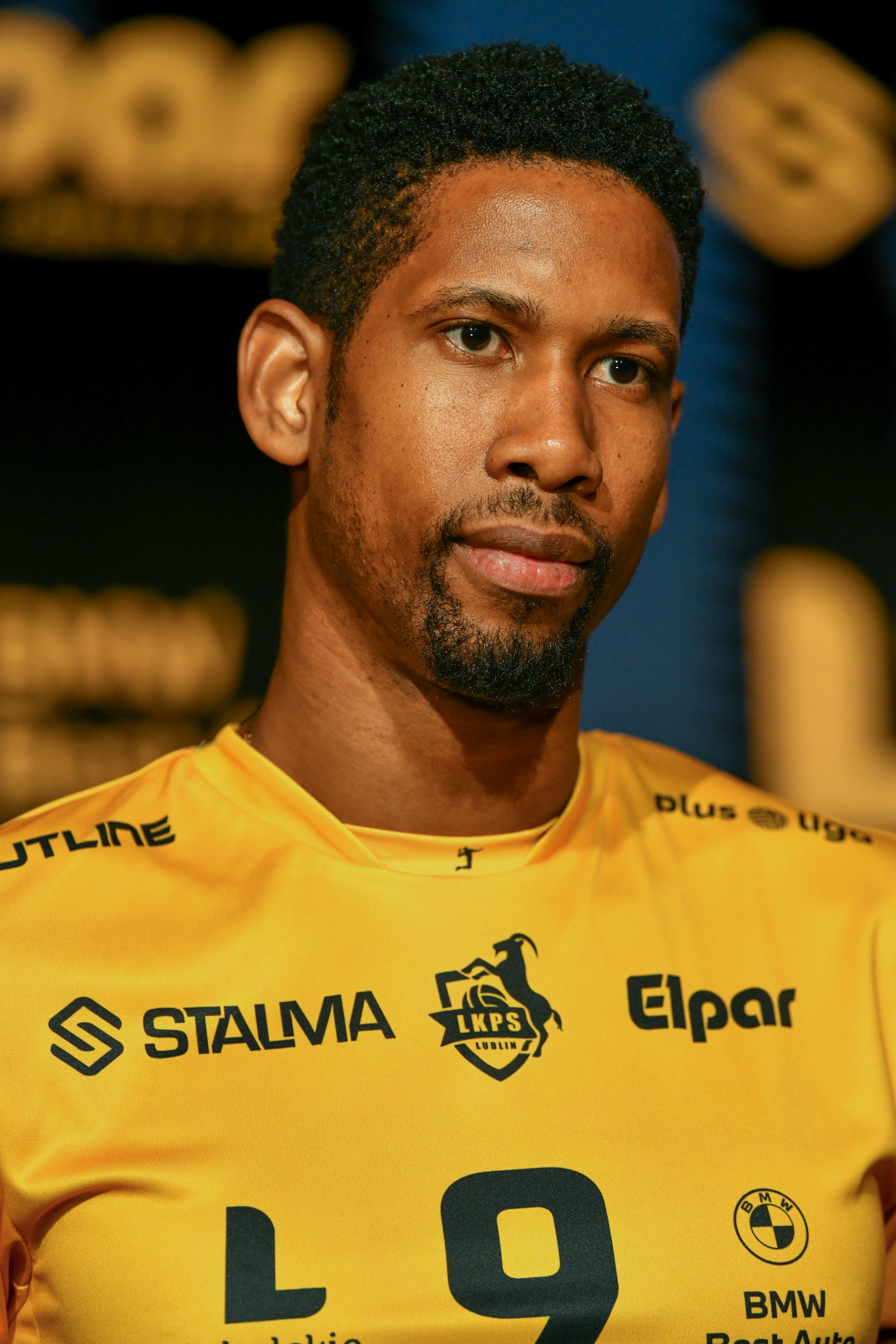
- León in 2024 with LKPS Lublin

Personal information
- Full name: Wilfredo León Venero
- Nickname: Leo
- Nationality: Cuban, Polish
- Born: 31 July 1993 (age 33) Santiago de Cuba
- Height: 2.01 m (6 ft 7 in)
- Weight: 96 kg (212 lb)
- Spike: 385 cm (152 in)
- Block: 346 cm (136 in)

Volleyball information
- Position: Outside hitter
- Current team: LUK Lublin
- Number: 9

Career
- Years: Team
- 2005–2010: Capitalinos
- 2010–2013: Orientales de Santiago
- 2014–2018: Zenit Kazan
- 2015: Al Rayyan
- 2016: Al Rayyan
- 2018–2024: Sir Safety Perugia
- 2024–: LUK Lublin

National team
- Years: Team
- 2007–2012: Cuba
- 2019–: Poland
Honours
Men's volleyball
Representing Cuba
FIVB World Championship
Silver medal – second place	2010 Italy
FIVB World Grand Champions Cup
Silver medal – second place	2009 Japan
FIVB World League
Bronze medal – third place	2012 Sofia
Pan American Games
Silver medal – second place	2011 Guadalajara
NORCECA Championship
Gold medal – first place	2009 Puerto Rico
Gold medal – first place	2011 Puerto Rico
Representing Poland
Olympic Games
Silver medal – second place	2024 Paris	Team
FIVB World Championship
Bronze medal – third place	2025 Philippines
FIVB World Cup
Silver medal – second place	2019 Japan
FIVB Nations League
Gold medal – first place	2023 Gdańsk
Gold medal – first place	2025 Ningbo
Gold medal – first place	2026 Ningbo
Silver medal – second place	2021 Rimini
Bronze medal – third place	2024 Łódź
CEV European Championship
Gold medal – first place	2023 Italy/Bulgaria/North Macedonia/Israel
Gold medal – first place	2026 Bulgaria/Finland/Italy/Romania
Bronze medal – third place	2019 Belgium/France/Netherlands/Slovenia
Bronze medal – third place	2021 Poland/Czechia/Estonia/Finland

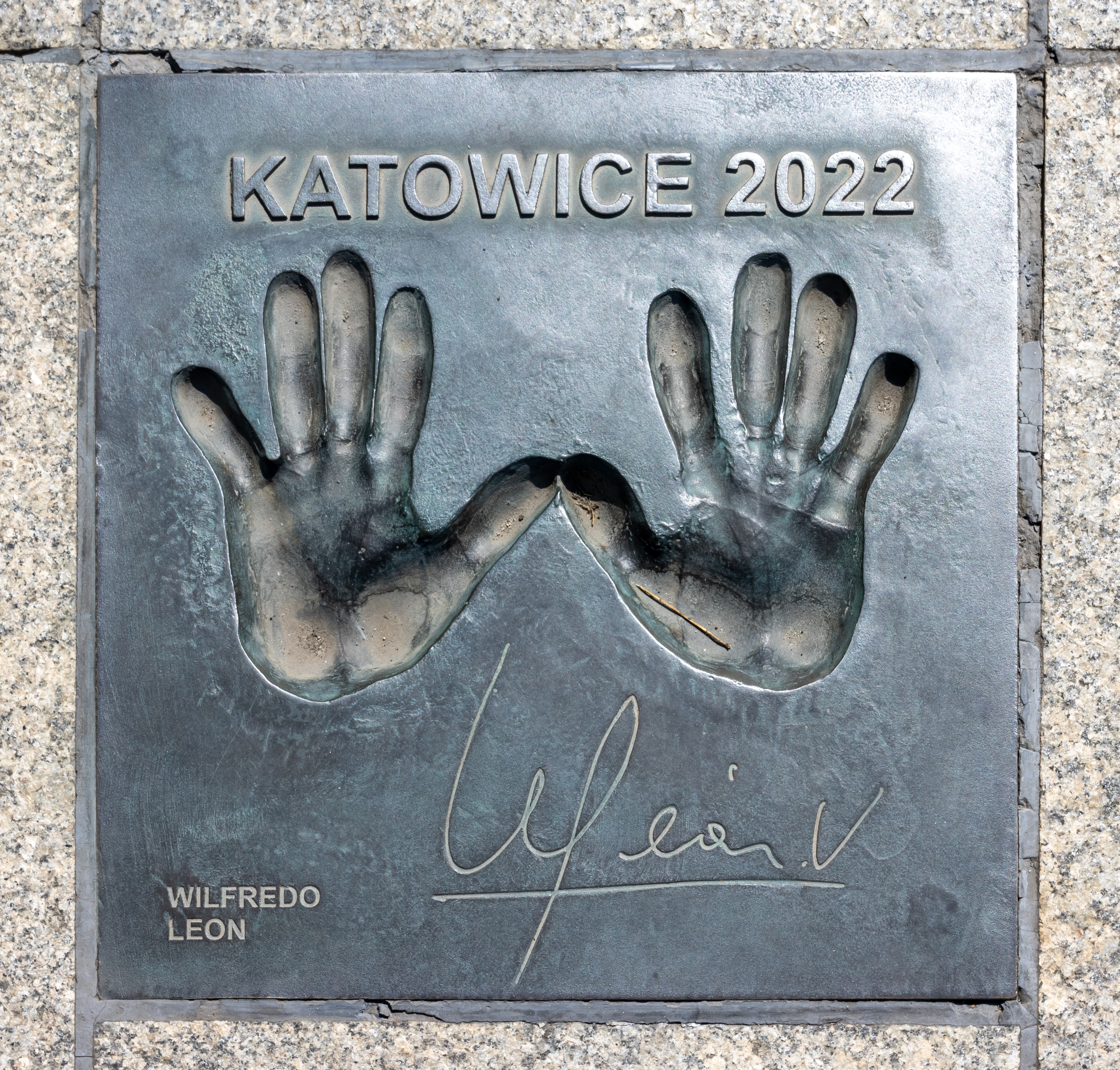
Hand prints and signature at the Avenue of Volleyball Stars, Katowice

Wilfredo León Venero (born 31 July 1993) is a professional volleyball player who plays as an outside hitter for the Polish PlusLiga club Bogdanka LUK Lublin and the Poland national team. He was born in Cuba, and was a member of his country of birth's national team from 2007 to 2012.

Considered by many as one of a kind, he led Cuba to the silver medal at the 2010 World Championship held in Italy, alongside Yoandy Leal and Robertlandy Simon. He is considered one of the leaders of the "Generation of Miracle" of Cuban volleyball by many experts.

== Personal life ==
León was born in Santiago de Cuba, Cuba on 31 July 1993. He is the son of Wilfredo León Hechavarría and Alina Venero Boza (former volleyball player). He studied at Escuela Nacional del Voleibol Cubano. León lived in Poland for a while with his Polish girlfriend. On 24 June 2016, he married Małgorzata (born Gronkowska). They have three children: two daughters, born in May 2017 and June 2023, and a son, born in November 2019.

== Career ==
León started to play when he was seven. His first coach was his mother, Alina. León debuted in the Cuban national team on 24 May 2008, in Düsseldorf, aged 14 years and 10 months. He won the title of Best Receiver at World League 2009. On 31 July 2009, he won a silver medal in the World U21 Championship (after losing the final against Brazil). In 2009, the Cuban national team, with Leon, won the title of NORCECA Champion (and three individual awards), and repeated this success in 2011. After losing the final against Brazil, Cuba won a silver medal at the 2010 World Championship. He was the youngest captain of the national team (he was 17). In 2012, he won the bronze medal at the World League.

In 2013, León left Cuba to play in a club outside of his homeland, losing the possibility of playing for the Cuban national team. He joined Russian club Zenit Kazan in 2014, where he won multiple CEV Champions League titles, national leagues, and cups. He also played part-time with Qatar club Al Rayyan in 2015 and 2016. In September 2018, León joined Italian team SIR Safety Perugia.

On 14 July 2015, León received Polish citizenship, and four years later he became fully eligible to play for the Poland national team.

On 10 August 2024, he won a silver medal at the 2024 Summer Olympic Games held in Paris.

== Honours ==
=== Club ===
- CEV Champions League
  - 2014–15 – with Zenit Kazan
  - 2015–16 – with Zenit Kazan
  - 2016–17 – with Zenit Kazan
  - 2017–18 – with Zenit Kazan
- FIVB Club World Championship
  - Poland 2017 – with Zenit Kazan
  - Betim 2022 – with Sir Safety Perugia
  - Bangalore 2023 – with Sir Safety Perugia
- CEV Challenge Cup
  - 2024–25 – with Bogdanka LUK Lublin
- Domestic
  - 2008–09 Cuban Championship, with Capitalinos
  - 2009–10 Cuban Championship, with Capitalinos
  - 2010–11 Cuban Championship, with Orientales de Santiago
  - 2014–15 Russian Cup, with Zenit Kazan
  - 2014–15 Russian Championship, with Zenit Kazan
  - 2015–16 Russian SuperCup, with Zenit Kazan
  - 2015–16 Russian Cup, with Zenit Kazan
  - 2015–16 Russian Championship, with Zenit Kazan
  - 2016–17 Russian SuperCup, with Zenit Kazan
  - 2016–17 Russian Cup, with Zenit Kazan
  - 2016–17 Russian Championship, with Zenit Kazan
  - 2017–18 Russian SuperCup, with Zenit Kazan
  - 2017–18 Russian Cup, with Zenit Kazan
  - 2017–18 Russian Championship, with Zenit Kazan
  - 2018–19 Italian Cup, with Sir Safety Perugia
  - 2019–20 Italian SuperCup, with Sir Safety Perugia
  - 2020–21 Italian SuperCup, with Sir Safety Perugia
  - 2021–22 Italian Cup, with Sir Safety Perugia
  - 2022–23 Italian SuperCup, with Sir Safety Perugia
  - 2023–24 Italian SuperCup, with Sir Safety Perugia
  - 2023–24 Italian Cup, with Sir Safety Perugia
  - 2023–24 Italian Championship, with Sir Safety Perugia
  - 2024–25 Polish Championship, with Bogdanka LUK Lublin
  - 2025–26 Polish SuperCup, with Bogdanka LUK Lublin
  - 2025–26 Polish Cup, with Bogdanka LUK Lublin
  - 2026–27 Polish SuperCup, with Bogdanka LUK Lublin

=== Individual awards ===
- 2009: FIVB World League – Best server
- 2009: NORCECA Championship – Best spiker
- 2009: NORCECA Championship – Most valuable player
- 2011: Pan American Games – Most valuable player
- 2011: NORCECA Championship – Best spiker
- 2011: NORCECA Championship – Best scorer
- 2015: CEV Champions League – Best outside spiker
- 2015: CEV Champions League – Most valuable player
- 2015: FIVB Club World Championship – Best outside spiker
- 2016: CEV Champions League – Best outside spiker
- 2016: CEV Champions League – Most valuable player
- 2016: FIVB Club World Championship – Best outside spiker
- 2017: CEV Champions League – Best outside spiker
- 2017: FIVB Club World Championship – Best outside spiker
- 2018: CEV Champions League – Best outside spiker
- 2019: CEV European Championship – Best outside spiker
- 2022: FIVB Club World Championship – Best outside spiker
- 2023: CEV European Championship – Most valuable player
- 2025: FIVB Nations League – Best outside spiker
- 2025: Polish SuperCup – Most valuable player
- 2026: Polish Cup – Best outside hitter
- 2026: CEV European Championship – Best outside hitter
- 2026: CEV European Championship – Most valuable player

=== State awards ===
- 2024: Knight's Cross of Polonia Restituta

=== Record ===
- 138 km/h serve speed

Awards
Preceded by (Brazil) Gilberto Godoy Filho	Best Server of FIVB World League; 2009	Succeeded by (Cuba) Yoandry Leal
Preceded by (Italy) Osmany Juantorena (Japan) Yūki Ishikawa	Best Outside Spiker of FIVB World Cup; 2019 ex aequo (Japan) Yūki Ishikawa	Succeeded by Incumbent
Preceded by (Russia) Dmitry Volkov (Germany) Denys Kaliberda	Best Outside Spiker; CEV European Championship; 2019 ex aequo (Serbia) Uroš Kovačević	Succeeded by (Italy) Alessandro Michieletto (Italy) Daniele Lavia
Preceded by –	Best Outside Spiker of CEV Champions League; 2014/2015 ex aequo (Argentina) Facundo Conte; 2015/2016 ex aequo (Slovenia) Tine Urnaut; 2016/2017 ex aequo (Italy) Ivan Zaytsev; 2017/2018 ex aequo (Italy) Osmany Juantorena	Succeeded by (Slovenia) Tine Urnaut (Cuba) Wilfredo León
Preceded by (Russia) Sergey Tetyukhin	Most Valuable Player of CEV Champions League; 2014/2015; 2015/2016	Succeeded by (Russia) Maxim Mikhaylov
Preceded by (Russia) Sergey Tetyukhin (Bulgaria) Matey Kaziyski	Best Outside Spiker of FIVB Club World Championship; 2015 ex aequo (Bulgaria) Todor Aleksiev; 2016 ex aequo (Cuba) Yoandry Leal; 2017 ex aequo (Brazil) Yoandry Leal	Succeeded by (Cuba) Yoandy Leal (Cuba) Wilfredo León
