= Keibel Gutiérrez =

Cuban volleyball player (born 1987)

Keibel Gutierrez Torna

Personal information
- Nationality: Cuban
- Born: 6 May 1987 (age 39)
- Height: 178 cm (5 ft 10 in)
- Weight: 80 kg (176 lb)
- Spike: 305 cm (120 in)
- Block: 295 cm (116 in)

Volleyball information
- Number: 6 (national team)

National team
2008-2012	Cuba
Honours
Men's volleyball
Representing Cuba
Pan American Games
Silver medal – second place	2011 Guadalajara	Team

Keibel Gutiérrez Torna (born May 6, 1987) is a volleyball player from Cuba, who plays as a libero for the Men's National Team. He won the award for "Best Receiver" at the first 2008 Olympic Qualification Tournament in Düsseldorf, where Cuba ended up in second place and missed qualification for the 2008 Summer Olympics in Beijing, P.R. China.

== Honours ==
- 2008 Olympic Qualification Tournament — 2nd place (did not qualify)
