= Yoandri Díaz =

Cuban volleyball player (born 1985)

Personal information
- Born: January 4, 1985 (age 41)
Medal record
Men's volleyball
Representing Cuba
Pan American Games
Bronze medal – third place	2007 Rio de Janeiro	Team
America's Cup
Bronze medal – third place	2005 São Leopoldo	Team

Yoandri Díaz Carmenate (born January 4, 1985) is a volleyball player from Cuba, who plays in different positions. He was a member of the Men's National Team that claimed the bronze medal at the 2005 America's Cup in São Leopoldo.
