= Dariel Albo =

Cuban volleyball player (born 1992)

Personal information
- Full name: Dariel Albo Miranda
- Nationality: Cuban
- Born: 17 January 1992 (age 34)
- Height: 201 cm (6 ft 7 in)
- Weight: 82 kg (181 lb)
- Spike: 343 cm (135 in)
- Block: 316 cm (124 in)

Volleyball information
- Position: Opposite
- Current club: Panathinaikos

Career
Years	Teams
2015–2016	La Habana
2016	Panathinaikos
2017-2018	UNTreF Vóley
2018-2019	Zahra Lebanon
2019	PAOK

National team
2015 –	Cuba

Dariel Albo Miranda (born 17 January 1992) is a Cuban male volleyball player. He is part of the Cuba men's national volleyball team. He didn't play in Rio Olympics in 2016 for being one of the six players of the Cuban national volleyball team that were remanded into custody suspected of committing aggravated rape in July 2016 in Tampere, Finland. In September 2016, he was the only one acquitted.

== Awards ==
=== National team ===
- 2016 Pan-American Volleyball Cup - Gold Medal
