= 2007 Volleyball America's Cup squads =

This article shows all participating team squads at the 2007 Volleyball America's Cup, held from August 15 to August 19, 2007, in Manaus, Brazil.

== Argentina ==
- Head coach: Jon Uriarte

#	Name	Date of birth	Weight	Height	Spike	Block
2	Gustavo Scholtis (c)	16.12.1982	85	206	349	332
3	Diego Stepanenko	25.02.1985	90	204	349	337
4	Luciano de Cecco	02.06.1988	84	194	333	315
6	Santiago Orduna	31.08.1983	72	184	333	324
7	Tomás Layus	26.06.1987	89	207	333	318
8	Leandro Concina	04.11.1984	94	195	345	325
9	Lucas Chávez	03.04.1982	88	200	348	328
11	Franco Giachetta
14	Facundo Santucci	06.03.1987	86	186	320	305
15	Rodrigo Quiroga	23.03.1987	84	194	345	327
16	Martín Hernández	23.03.1985	80	202	351	330
18	Gastón Giani	26.04.1979	194	86	345	330

== Brazil ==
- Head Coach: Bernardo Rezende

#	Name	Date of birth	Weight	Height	Spike	Block
1	Bruno Rezende	02.07.1986	76	190	323	302
2	Luiz Felipe Fonteles
3	Eder Carbonera
4	Alan Domingos	15.02.1980	75	189	354	323
6	Samuel Fuchs	04.03.1984	89	200	342	316
7	Thiago Alves
8	Murilo Endres (c)	03.05.1981	76	190	343	319
12	Evandro Guerra
14	Riad Ribeiro
15	Roberto Minuzzi
16	Lucas Saatkamp	06.03.1986	101	209	340	321
17	Rafael Redwitz

== Canada ==
- Head Coach: Glenn Hoag

#	Name	Date of birth	Weight	Height	Spike	Block
2	Bernier Christian	20.11.1981	91	192	341	318
6	Jeremy Wilcox	22.02.1979	82	188	353	314
7	Dallas Soonias	25.04.1984	91	200	356	323
8	Scott Koskie	14.12.1971	85	190	330	312
9	Paul Duerden	22.10.1974	96	195	358	320
11	Steve Brinkman	12.01.1978	92	202	352	320
12	Chris Wolfenden	22.06.1977	89	194	341	321
14	Murray Grapentine (c)	24.08.1977	98	202	359	334
15	Fred Winters	25.09.1982	95	198	359	327
16	Leo Carroll	06.07.1983	106	204	354	326
17	Alexandre Gaumont Casias
18	Nicholas Cundy

== Cuba ==
- Head Coach: Pedro Valdes

#	Name	Date of birth	Weight	Height	Spike	Block
3	Jorge Sánchez Salgado	23.03.1985	81	197	345	313
4	Yoandry Leal	31.08.1988	84	201	261	348
7	Darien Ferrer	31.10.1983	84	204	362	346
10	Rolando Jurquin	07.06.1987	86	200	341	328
11	Yadier Sánchez	08.01.1987	83	200	341	328
12	Pedro Iznaga	11.08.1986	87	195	340	333
13	Robertlandy Simón	11.06.1987	91	206	358	326
14	Raydel Hierrezuelo	14.07.1987	87	196	340	335
15	Oriol Camejo	22.07.1986	94	207	354	326
16	Raydel Corrales	15.02.1982	94	201	355	325
17	Odelvis Dominico (c)	06.05.1977	87	205	360	356
18	Yoandri Díaz	04.01.1985	89	196	358	328

== Dominican Republic ==
- Head Coach: Jacinto Campechano

#	Name	Date of birth	Weight	Height	Spike	Block
2	Felipe Henriquez Díaz	16.09.1977	77	183	330	310
3	Elvis Contreras (c)	16.05.1984	75	185	345	320
5	Hilariun Monción	21.10.1979	70	182	314	290
7	Eduardo Concepción	01.11.1983	90	196	330	320
8	Jorge Luis Galva	24.09.1988	97	196	335	321
9	Amaury Martínez	13.02.1973	90	192	325	320
10	Francisco Abreu	26.04.1982	92	183	331	315
11	José Miguel Cáceres	24.12.1981	96	210	361	340
12	Franklin González	27.07.1985	70	185	318	272
13	Juan Eury Almonte	19.08.1978	96	196	350	330
14	Yhonastan Fabian	18.03.1984	80	180	315	290
15	Juan Tejada	29.08.1981	96	187	320	308

== United States ==
- Head Coach: Hugh McCutcheon

#	Name	Date of birth	Weight	Height	Spike	Block
1	Lloy Ball	17.02.1972	95	203	351	316
2	Sean Rooney	13.11.1982	100	206	354	336
3	James Polster	08.02.1979	100	198	352	333
5	Richard Lambourne	06.05.1975	90	190	324	312
6	Phillip Eatherton	02.01.1974	101	206	356	335
8	William Priddy	01.10.1977	89	196	353	330
9	Ryan Millar	22.01.1978	98	204	354	326
10	Riley Salmon	02.07.1976	89	197	345	331
11	Brook Billings	30.04.1980	95	196	351	331
12	Thomas Hoff (c)	09.06.1973	94	198	353	333
13	Clayton Stanley	20.01.1978	104	205	357	332
14	Kevin Hansen	19.03.1982	93	196	349	330
