= 2007 Men's NORCECA Volleyball Championship squads =

This article shows all participating team squads at the 2007 Men's NORCECA Volleyball Championship, held from September 16 to September 21, 2007, in the Anaheim Convention Center in Anaheim, United States.

== Barbados ==
- Head Coach: Ludger Niles

#	Name	Date of birth	Weight	Height	Spike	Block
1	Dwight Carter	23.07.1986	86	185	305	300
2	Jamal Nedd	19.02.1982	87	195	325	315
5	Elwyn Oxley (c)	11.02.1987	85	185	320	315
6	Renier Grace	26.10.1978	90	195	325	315
8	Romel Agard	28.11.1985	88	200	330	320
9	Daran Gill	02.01.1985	86	195	325	320
11	Adrian Price	01.03.1982	85	187	320	315
12	Justin Bennett	04.04.1989	86	190	320	315
13	Alain London	14.10.1987	86	190	320	315
14	Shawn Simpson	08.03.1984	88	197	325	320
17	Dale Addison	22.02.1976	90	187	325	320
18	Damien Danzell	12.03.1985	86	190	320	315

== Canada ==
- Head Coach: Glenn Hoag

#	Name	Date of birth	Weight	Height	Spike	Block
1	Louis-Pierre Mainville	03.04.1986	95	200	340	324
2	Christian Bernier	20.11.1981	91	192	341	318
3	Daniel Lewis	03.04.1976	92	193	349	325
5	Michael Munday	14.11.1980	91	205	305	286
6	Jeremy Wilcox	22.02.1979	82	188	353	314
7	Dallas Soonias	25.04.1984	91	200	356	323
11	Steve Brinkman	12.01.1978	92	202	352	320
12	Chris Wolfenden	22.06.1977	89	194	341	321
14	Murray Grapentine (c)	24.08.1977	98	202	359	334
15	Frédéric Winters	25.09.1982	95	198	359	327
16	Leo Carroll	06.07.1983	106	204	354	326
18	Gavin Schmitt	27.01.1986	106	204	362	339

== Cuba ==
- Head Coach: Samuels Blackwood

#	Name	Date of birth	Weight	Height	Spike	Block
3	Jorge Sánchez Salgado	23.03.1985	81	197	345	313
6	Tornakeibel Gutiérrez	06.05.1987	80	178	305	295
8	Pavel Pimienta (c)	02.08.1975	96	204	365	340
10	Rolando Jurquin	07.06.1987	86	200	341	328
11	Yadier Sánchez	08.01.1987	83	200	341	328
12	Pedro Iznaga	11.08.1986	87	195	340	333
13	Robertlandy Simón	11.06.1987	91	206	358	326
14	Raydel Hierrezuelo	14.07.1987	87	196	340	335
15	Oreol Camejo	22.07.1986	94	207	354	326
16	Raydel Corrales	15.02.1982	94	201	355	325
17	Odelvis Dominico	06.05.1977	87	205	360	356
18	Yoandri Díaz	04.01.1985	89	196	358	328

== Dominican Republic ==
- Head Coach: Jacinto Campechano

#	Name	Date of birth	Weight	Height	Spike	Block
3	Elvis Contreras (c)	16.05.1984	75	185	345	320
4	José Alberto Castro	12.01.1981	82	188	336	326
5	Hilariun Monción	21.10.1979	70	182	314	290
6	Juan Tejada	29.08.1981	96	187	320	308
7	Eduardo Concepción	01.11.1983	90	196	330	320
8	Jorge Luis Galva	24.09.1988	97	196	335	321
9	Amaury Martínez	13.02.1973	90	192	325	320
11	José Miguel Cáceres	24.12.1981	96	210	361	340
12	Franklin González	27.07.1985	70	185	318	272
13	Juan Eury Almonte	19.08.1978	96	196	350	330
14	Yhonastan Fabian	18.03.1984	80	180	315	290
16	Víctor Batista	02.10.1979	90	199	350	340

== Mexico ==
- Head Coach: Jorge Azair

#	Name	Date of birth	Weight	Height	Spike	Block
1	Mario Becerra (c)	18.05.1978	86	192	330	320
2	Jorge Barajas	07.05.1991	70	184	313	306
3	Francisco Enriquez	17.10.1989	95	199	325	318
4	Edgar Herrera	22.01.1988	90	195	335	327
6	Daniel Noriega	23.08.1989	78	187	335	320
9	Martín Petris	23.07.1990	80	195	337	322
13	Raymundo Torres	30.11.1989	73	177	310	307
14	Tomás Aguilera	15.11.1988	85	202	336	328
15	Gilberto Ruiz	03.05.1989	83	193	328	320
18	Fabián Leal	30.04.1985	78	186	331	325

== Puerto Rico ==
- Head Coach: Carlos Cardona

#	Name	Date of birth	Weight	Height	Spike	Block
1	José Rivera	02.07.1977	85	192	325	320
2	Gregory Berrios	24.01.1979	83	182	305	299
4	Víctor Rivera	30.08.1976	88	195	345	329
6	Ángel Pérez	20.05.1982	86	190	325	318
9	Luis Rodríguez	13.07.1969	89	202	340	333
10	Víctor Bird	16.03.1982	90	195	335	328
11	Roberto Muñoz	11.06.1980	92	194	333	326
12	Héctor Soto (c)	20.06.1978	85	197	340	332
13	Alexis Matias	21.07.1974	88	195	335	325
14	Fernando Morales	04.02.1982	68	186	299	292
16	Enrique Escalante	06.08.1984	88	195	330	324
19	Leonardo Aquino	09.11.1984	82	188	298	291

== Trinidad and Tobago ==
- Head Coach: Gideon Dickson

#	Name	Date of birth	Weight	Height	Spike	Block
1	Jessel Davis	15.11.1982	76	196	365	345
2	Kevin Nimrod	13.02.1985	82	196	359	349
4	Nolan Tash (c)	14.02.1977	92	191	310	345
6	Vaughn Martin	02.07.1975	82	178	338	323
8	Saleem Ali	01.04.1979	84	193	340	325
9	Christian Francois	02.10.1985	77	191	355	340
10	Kelvin Alleyne	04.04.1979	75	185	352	337
11	Sean Morrison	10.04.1983	73	191	356	341
13	Kevin Amarali	01.10.1981	66	191	342	327
14	Marc-Anthony Honoré	12.06.1989	82	204	367	352
16	Russell Peña	05.06.1985	101	196	360	345
17	Hollis Charles	10.01.1986	89	193	364	349

== United States ==
- Head Coach: Hugh McCutcheon

#	Name	Date of birth	Weight	Height	Spike	Block
1	Lloy Ball	17.02.1972	95	203	351	316
3	James Polster	08.02.1979	100	198	352	333
5	Richard Lambourne	06.05.1975	90	190	324	312
7	David Lee	08.03.1982	105	203	350	325
8	William Priddy	01.10.1977	89	196	353	330
9	Ryan Millar	22.01.1978	98	204	354	326
10	Riley Salmon	02.07.1976	89	197	345	331
12	Thomas Hoff (c)	09.06.1973	94	198	353	333
13	Clayton Stanley	20.01.1978	104	205	357	332
14	Kevin Hansen	19.03.1982	93	196	349	330
15	Gabriel Gardner	18.03.1976	103	209	353	335
18	Scott Touzinsky	22.04.1982	86	198	350	331
