= 2007 Men's Pan-American Volleyball Cup squads =

This article shows all participating team squads at the 2007 Men's Pan-American Volleyball Cup, held from June 1 to June 9, 2007 in Santo Domingo, Dominican Republic.

== Canada ==
- Head Coach: Chris Green

#	Name	Date of birth	Height	Weight	Spike	Block
4	Kris Brand
5	Toontje Van Lankvelt
6	Brock Davidiuck (c)
7	Dallas Soonias
8	Josh Klassen
9	Jeff Weiler
10	Oliver Faucher
12	Leo Carroll
13	Mark Dodds
14	Adam Kaminski
15	Jonathan Marcoux
17	Alexandre Gaumont

== Cuba ==
- Head Coach: Juan Carlos Gala

#	Name	Date of birth	Height	Weight	Spike	Block
3	Darien Ferrer
4	Yadier Sánchez Sierra (c)
5	Osmany Camejo Durruthy
7	Pedro López Fernández
10	Raidel Delgado González
11	Yosvany González Nicolás
12	Yoandry Leal Hidalgo
13	David De la Torre Morell
14	Yosnier Guillén Gato
17	Raidel González Toirac

== Dominican Republic ==
- Head Coach: Juan Carlos Perdomo

#	Name	Date of birth	Height	Weight	Spike	Block
2	Felipe Henríquez Díaz	16.09.1977	77	183	330	310
3	Elvis Contreras	16.05.1984	75	185	345	320
5	Hilariun Monción	21.10.1979	70	182	314	290
7	Eduardo Concepción	01.11.1983	92	195	346	316
8	Jorge Luis Galva	24.09.1988	97	196	335	321
9	Amaury Martínez	13.02.1973	90	192	325	320
10	Francisco Abreu López	26.04.1982	92	183	331	315
11	José Miguel Cáceres	24.12.1981	96	210	361	340
12	José Castro	12.01.1981	87	185	336	312
13	Juan Eury Almonte (c)	19.08.1978	96	196	350	330
14	Juan Antonio Pozo	30.01.1979	109	190	320	320
15	César Canario	10.10.1985	66	185	347	315

== Mexico ==
- Head Coach: Carlos Novoa

#	Name	Date of birth	Height	Weight	Spike	Block
1	Mario Becerra
2	Jesús González
3	David Alba
4	Gustavo Meyer
5	Pedro Rangel
6	Irving Bricio
8	Ignacio Ramírez
11	Juan García (c)
12	José Martell
14	Tomás Aguilera
17	Raymundo Valdez
18	Fabián Leal

== Panama ==
- Head Coach: José Remon

#	Name	Date of birth	Height	Weight	Spike	Block
1	Domingo Ávila
4	José Cunnighman
6	Carlos Zúñiga
7	Horacio Angulo
8	Francisco De Toma
9	Grabriel Calderón
11	Eduardo Guerra (c)
12	Carlos Vega
13	Víctor Herazo
14	Edward Díaz
15	Otto Penzo
16	Luis Maclao

== Puerto Rico ==
- Head Coach: Jorge Pérez Vento

#	Name	Date of birth	Height	Weight	Spike	Block
2	Gregory Berrios
5	Carlos Ramírez
7	Ángel Matías
10	Víctor Bird
11	Roberto Muñiz
12	David Menéndez
13	Alexis Matias (c)
14	Fernando Morales
15	Juan Figueroa
16	Enrique Escalante
18	José Núñez

== Trinidad and Tobago ==
- Head Coach: Gideon Dickson

#	Name	Date of birth	Height	Weight	Spike	Block
1	Jessel Davis
2	Kevin Nimroo
4	Nolan Tash (c)
6	Vaughn Martin
8	Saleem Ali
10	Kevin Alleyne
11	Sean Morrison
13	Kevin Amarali
14	Marc-Anthony Honoré
15	Adrian Paul
16	Russel Peña
17	Ryan Mahadeo
