= 2001 Men's NORCECA Volleyball Championship squads =

This article shows all participating team squads at the 2001 Men's NORCECA Volleyball Championship, held from September 21 to September 29, 2001 in Bridgetown, Barbados.

== Barbados ==
- Head Coach: Ludger Niles

#	Name	Date of birth	Weight	Height	Spike	Block
1	Paul Nicholls	20.04.1981	61	178	318	305
2	Jamal Nedd	19.02.1982	87	195	325	315
3	Fabian Cox	09.01.1980	81	180	335	315
4	Rodney Mayers	10.02.1976	84	178	318	305
6	Renier Grace	26.10.1978	85	195	325	315
9	Andy Jordan	15.03.1966	88	195	335	320
10	Gregory Burke	05.11.1973	87	195	335	320
11	Henderson Dottin	09.11.1980	81	196	335	330
13	Adrian Price	01.03.1982	77	185	325	315
16	Cedric Proverbs	27.10.1971	87	193	330	320
17	Dale Addison	22.02.1976	90	187	325	320

== Canada ==
- Head Coach: Stelio DeRocco

#	Name	Date of birth	Weight	Height	Spike	Block
1	Douglas Bruce	07.05.1974	94	197	348	318
2	Sébastien Ruette	22.06.1977	90	200	356	324
3	Daniel Lewis	03.04.1976	92	193	349	325
4	Chris Bildfell	02.03.1977	93	198	354	322
5	Andrew Zurawsky	09.04.1974	93	200	344	315
8	Scott Koskie	31.12.1971	85	190	330	312
11	Steve Brinkman	12.01.1978	92	202	352	320
12	Chris Wolfenden	22.06.1977	89	194	341	321
13	Éric Lebreton	08.07.1976	93	193	356	322
14	Murray Grapentine	24.08.1977	98	202	359	334
16	Terence Martin	01.11.1976	190	202	365	338
18	Ian Taylor	03.10.1977	95	195	344	315

== Cuba ==
- Head Coach: Gilberto Herrera Delgado

#	Name	Date of birth	Weight	Height	Spike	Block
1	Leonel Marhall	25.09.1979	86	198	365	350
2	Ihosvany Chambers	26.03.1972	85	184	335	320
3	Rodolfo Sánchez	27.04.1969	92	198	345	335
5	Jorge Luis Hernández	20.08.1978	87	199	359	347
7	Ángel Dennis	13.06.1977	87	193	358	335
8	Pavel Pimienta (c)	02.08.1975	96	204	365	340
9	Raúl Diago	01.08.1967	84	192	350	335
10	Tomás Aldazabal	30.05.1976	83	193	360	340
12	Yosnier Guillen Gato	11.08.1986	87	195	340	333
13	Alain Roca	07.09.1976	90	198	350	340
14	Ihosvany Hernández	08.02.1972	95	206	368	350
17	Odelvis Dominico	06.05.1977	87	205	360	356

== Dominican Republic ==
- Head Coach: Beato Miguel Cruz

#	Name	Date of birth	Weight	Height	Spike	Block
2	Felipe Henríquez Díaz	16.09.1977	77	183	330	310
3	Elvis Contreras	16.05.1984	75	185	345	320
4	Cristian Cruz (c)	30.08.1974	100	180	270	280
5	Luis Méndez	30.10.1971	88	195	330	340
6	Elvis Pascual	25.11.1984	72	190	335	325
7	Eduardo Concepción	01.11.1983	90	196	330	320
9	Amaury Martínez	13.02.1973	90	192	325	320
10	Francisco Valdez	07.03.1982	84	197	335	335
12	Juan Antonio Pozo	30.01.1979	109	190	320	320
13	Juan Eury Almonte	19.08.1978	96	196	350	330
14	Jairo Cuevas	16.05.1983	81	185	330	315
15	Robin Bautista	20.02.1983	75	195	340	340
16	Germán García	03.04.1985	79	187	350	335

== Mexico ==
- Head Coach: Marco Heredia

#	Name	Date of birth	Weight	Height	Spike	Block
1	Mario Becerra (c)	18.05.1978	86	192	330	320
2	Erik Rojo	18.02.1985	78	184	325	316
4	Carlos Ayala	04.11.1978	71	186	343	335
5	Jesús Rangel	20.09.1980	81	190	350	340
7	José Martell	21.10.1976	85	194	350	340
8	Pedro Flores	26.03.1980	107	200	333	322
9	Ignacio Ramírez	17.09.1976	85	183	325	314
10	Israel Villalpando	18.04.1984	80	192	328	320
11	Juan García	13.10.1976	120	203	340	321
12	Alejandro Ramírez	26.08.1983	88	197	330	315
13	Carlos Arias	12.06.1981	92	197	340	332
15	Roberto Márquez	15.11.1981	74	187	333	323

== United States ==
- Head Coach: Douglas Beal

#	Name	Date of birth	Weight	Height	Spike	Block
1	Richard Lambourne	06.05.1975	90	190	324	312
2	Kyle Robinson	04.07.1974	90	196	344	327
3	Richard Taliaferro	28.09.1977	100	196	342	325
4	Philip Eatherton	02.01.1974	101	206	356	336
5	Erik Sullivan	09.08.1972	86	193	340	320
6	Colin McMillan	10.06.1977	100	210	352	337
7	Donald Suxho	21.02.1976	98	196	353	330
8	William Priddy	01.10.1977	89	196	353	330
9	Scott Wong	01.11.1978	95	196	348	332
10	Riley Salmon	02.07.1976	89	197	345	331
11	Michael Rupp	08.06.1977	98	196	341	327
12	Thomas Hoff (c)	09.06.1973	94	198	353	333
13	Clayton Stanley	20.01.1978	104	205	357	332
14	Kevin Barnett	14.05.1974	94	198	353	340
15	Keith Barnett	17.05.1978	91	190	326	316
16	William Rafter	02.06.1977	93	194	330	321
17	Scott Bunker	27.04.1976	95	193	326	314
18	Adam Naeve	18.02.1978	98	211	353	338
