= Jason Haldane =

Canadian volleyball player (born 1971)

Personal information
- Nationality: Canadian
- Born: 23 July 1971 (age 55); Terrace, British Columbia, Canada
- Hometown: Terrace, British Columbia
- Height: 2.03 m (6 ft 8 in)
- Weight: 102 kg (225 lb)
- Spike: 355 cm (11 ft 8 in)
- Block: 325 cm (10 ft 8 in)
- Education: Grande Prairie Regional College

Volleyball information
- Position: Middle blocker

Career
Years	Teams
1990–1992; 1994–1996; 1996–1998; 1998–2000; 2000–2002; 2002; 2002–2003; 2003–2005; 2005–2006; 2006–2008; 2008–2009; 2009–2010; 2010–2011; 2011–2012	GPRC Wolves; VC Helios; Montpellier Volley; AS Cannes; Paris Volley; Prisma Volley; Olympiacos; AS Cannes; Tours VB; Lokomotiv Ekaterinburg; Yoga Forlì; Acqua Paradiso Monza; Çankaya Belediyesi; CSKA Sofia

National team
1992–2004; 2009–2012	Canada; Great Britain
Honours
Men's volleyball
Representing Canada
NORCECA Championship
Bronze medal – third place	1997 San Juan
Bronze medal – third place	1999 Monterrey

Jason Haldane (born 23 July 1971) is a Canadian former professional volleyball player. He played for the Canada men's national volleyball team between 1992 and 2004, representing Canada at the 1994, 1998, and 2002 FIVB World Championships. In 2009, he switched to the Great Britain men's national volleyball team, competing in the 2012 Summer Olympics for Great Britain.

== Personal life ==
Haldane's father was born in Great Britain, so Haldane held a British passport while playing in Europe.

== Career ==
Haldane played volleyball at Grande Prairie Regional College from 1990 to 1992.
