= 2026 Men's NORCECA Volleyball Championship squads =

National team squads for 2026 NORCECA Championship

This article shows the rosters of all participating teams at the 2026 Men's NORCECA Volleyball Championship in Moncton, New Brunswick, Canada.

== Canada ==
The following is the Canada squad.

Head coach: (Canada) Daniel Lewis

| No. | Name | Pos. | Date of birth | Height | Spike | Block | 2025–26 club |
|---|---|---|---|---|---|---|---|
| 2 | Luke Herr | S | 18 Jul 1994 | 1.92 m (6 ft 4 in) | 325 cm (10 ft 8 in) | 307 cm (10 ft 1 in) | (Greece) AONS Milon |
| 6 | Danny Demyanenko | MB | 13 Jul 1994 | 1.96 m (6 ft 5 in) | 355 cm (11 ft 8 in) | 325 cm (10 ft 8 in) | (Poland) Asseco Resovia Rzeszow |
| 7 | Stephen Maar | OH | 6 Dec 1994 | 2.01 m (6 ft 7 in) | 358 cm (11 ft 9 in) | 329 cm (10 ft 10 in) | (Turkey) Galatasaray |
| 9 | Max Elgert | S | 31 Aug 1998 | 1.91 m (6 ft 3 in) | 343 cm (11 ft 3 in) | 320 cm (10 ft 6 in) | (Poland) Jastrzębie Barkom |
| 11 | Xander Ketrzynski | OP | 27 Jan 2000 | 2.08 m (6 ft 10 in) | 360 cm (11 ft 10 in) | 330 cm (10 ft 10 in) | (South Korea) Incheon Korean Air Jumbos |
| 13 | Sharone Vernon-Evans | OP | 28 Aug 1998 | 2.06 m (6 ft 9 in) | 382 cm (12 ft 6 in) | 347 cm (11 ft 5 in) | (South Korea) Suwon KEPCO Vixtorm |
| 15 | Jackson Young | OH | 29 Jul 2001 | 1.95 m (6 ft 5 in) | 356 cm (11 ft 8 in) | 323 cm (10 ft 7 in) | (Turkey) Altekma |
| 16 | Daenan Gyimah | MB | 16 Jan 1998 | 2.00 m (6 ft 7 in) | 380 cm (12 ft 6 in) | 347 cm (11 ft 5 in) | (Poland) Bogdanka LUK Lublin |
| 17 | Jackson Howe | MB | 16 Jun 1998 | 1.98 m (6 ft 6 in) | 366 cm (12 ft 0 in) | 335 cm (11 ft 0 in) | (Italy) Cucine Lube Civitanova |
| 33 | Fynnian Lionel McCarthy | OP | 4 Dec 1999 | 2.00 m (6 ft 7 in) | 362 cm (11 ft 11 in) | 321 cm (10 ft 6 in) | (Japan) Osaka Blueteon |
| 80 | Eric Loeppky C | OH | 1 Aug 1998 | 1.97 m (6 ft 6 in) | 355 cm (11 ft 8 in) | 325 cm (10 ft 8 in) | (Italy) Cucine Lube Civitanova |
| 87 | Zachary Hollands | L | 24 Nov 1999 | 1.82 m (6 ft 0 in) | 344 cm (11 ft 3 in) | 314 cm (10 ft 4 in) | (France) Alterna Stade Poitevin |
| 97 | Landon Currie | L | 16 Oct 1999 | 1.74 m (5 ft 9 in) | 310 cm (10 ft 2 in) | 225 cm (7 ft 5 in) | (Canada) University of Alberta |
| 99 | Skyler Varga | OH | 6 Mar 2003 | 2.00 m (6 ft 7 in) | 358 cm (11 ft 9 in) | 330 cm (10 ft 10 in) | (Japan) Toray Arrows Shizuoka |

== Cuba ==
The following is the Cuba squad.

Head coach: Jesús Cruz

| No. | Name | Pos. | Date of birth | Height | Spike | Block | 2025–26 club |
|---|---|---|---|---|---|---|---|
| 2 | Osniel Melgarejo | OH | 18 Dec 1997 | 1.96 m (6 ft 5 in) | 353 cm (11 ft 7 in) | 327 cm (10 ft 9 in) | (Cuba) Santic Spiritus |
| 7 | Yonder Garcia | L | 26 Feb 1993 | 1.75 m (5 ft 9 in) | 325 cm (10 ft 8 in) | 310 cm (10 ft 2 in) | (Cuba) Ciudad Habana |
| 9 | Alejandro Gonzalez | OP | 12 Mar 2003 | 2.07 m (6 ft 9 in) | 367 cm (12 ft 0 in) | 338 cm (11 ft 1 in) | (Cuba) Matanzas |
| 12 | Lazaro Arrechea | L | 16 Mar 2000 | 1.90 m (6 ft 3 in) | 335 cm (11 ft 0 in) | 320 cm (10 ft 6 in) | (Cuba) Cienfuegos |
| 13 | Robertlandy Simon | MB | 11 Jun 1987 | 2.08 m (6 ft 10 in) | 368 cm (12 ft 1 in) | 346 cm (11 ft 4 in) | (Italy) Cucine Lube Civitanova |
| 15 | David Fiel | MB | 28 Aug 1993 | 2.05 m (6 ft 9 in) | 374 cm (12 ft 3 in) | 369 cm (12 ft 1 in) | (Poland) Skra Bełchatów |
| 16 | Yusniel Gonzalez | OH | 23 Jul 2004 | 1.98 m (6 ft 6 in) | 358 cm (11 ft 9 in) | 325 cm (10 ft 8 in) | (Cuba) Pinar del Rio |
| 18 | Miguel Angel Lopez C | OH | 25 Mar 1997 | 1.89 m (6 ft 2 in) | 345 cm (11 ft 4 in) | 320 cm (10 ft 6 in) | (Japan) Osaka Bluteon |
| 20 | Thiago Suarez | MB | 15 Sep 2004 | 1.94 m (6 ft 4 in) | 345 cm (11 ft 4 in) | 343 cm (11 ft 3 in) | (Cuba) Pinar del Rio |
| 23 | Marlon Yant | OH | 23 May 2001 | 2.02 m (6 ft 8 in) | 345 cm (11 ft 4 in) | 320 cm (10 ft 6 in) | (Cuba) Villa Clara |
| 24 | Ronaldo Flaquet | S | 30 Jan 2007 | 1.93 m (6 ft 4 in) | 345 cm (11 ft 4 in) | 338 cm (11 ft 1 in) | (Cuba) Maranzas |
| 28 | Christian Thondike Mejías | S | 28 May 2001 | 1.90 m (6 ft 3 in) | 360 cm (11 ft 10 in) | 335 cm (11 ft 0 in) | (Cuba) Leones de La Habana |
| 30 | Daniel Martinez | OP | 10 Sep 2005 | 2.15 m (7 ft 1 in) | 368 cm (12 ft 1 in) | 365 cm (12 ft 0 in) | (Cuba) Matanzas |
| 99 | Alexis Wilson Velazquez | MB | 23 Oct 2003 | 2.02 m (6 ft 8 in) | 369 cm (12 ft 1 in) | 340 cm (11 ft 2 in) | (Cuba) Leones de La Habana |

== Curaçao ==
The following is the Curaçao squad.

Head coach: (Netherlands) Henrich Daal

| No. | Name | Pos. | Date of birth | Height | Spike | Block | 2025–26 club |
|---|---|---|---|---|---|---|---|
| 1 | Raynold Marchena | S | 18 Jan 1994 | 1.87 m (6 ft 2 in) | 305 cm (10 ft 0 in) | 300 cm (9 ft 10 in) | (Curaçao) Watakeli |
| 2 | Alexis Molina | OP | 15 Jul 1997 | 1.87 m (6 ft 2 in) | 330 cm (10 ft 10 in) | 325 cm (10 ft 8 in) | (Netherlands) VV Amsterdam |
| 3 | Sharif Gabriel | MB | 18 Apr 1995 | 1.92 m (6 ft 4 in) | 335 cm (11 ft 0 in) | 330 cm (10 ft 10 in) | (Netherlands) Inter Rijswijk |
| 4 | Ernaldo Mota | L | 8 Mar 1993 | 1.72 m (5 ft 8 in) | 305 cm (10 ft 0 in) | 300 cm (9 ft 10 in) | (Curaçao) Watakeli |
| 5 | Timothy van Henneigen | OH | 10 Jan 2006 | 1.82 m (6 ft 0 in) | 330 cm (10 ft 10 in) | 325 cm (10 ft 8 in) | (Curaçao) Stakamahakchi |
| 6 | Siriviano Clemencia | OP | 17 Dec 1990 | 1.92 m (6 ft 4 in) | 325 cm (10 ft 8 in) | 320 cm (10 ft 6 in) | (Curaçao) Watakeli |
| 7 | Giandro Tokaay | S | 25 Mar 1990 | 1.82 m (6 ft 0 in) | 315 cm (10 ft 4 in) | 310 cm (10 ft 2 in) | (Curaçao) Warwaru |
| 8 | Shuruendy Valeriano | OH | 26 Feb 1998 | 1.83 m (6 ft 0 in) | 325 cm (10 ft 8 in) | 320 cm (10 ft 6 in) | (Netherlands) Inter Rijswijk |
| 9 | Marlison Kleinmoedig | OP | 20 Jun 1997 | 1.92 m (6 ft 4 in) | 335 cm (11 ft 0 in) | 330 cm (10 ft 10 in) | (Netherlands) PDK Huizen |
| 10 | Derwin Colina | OH | 27 Jan 1991 | 1.90 m (6 ft 3 in) | 330 cm (10 ft 10 in) | 320 cm (10 ft 6 in) | (Netherlands) PDK Huizen |
| 11 | Raygid Isenia C | MB | 26 Nov 1991 | 1.80 m (5 ft 11 in) | 255 cm (8 ft 4 in) | 250 cm (8 ft 2 in) | (Netherlands) Sliedrecht Sport |
| 12 | Ludrich Inocente | MB | 13 Sep 1996 | 2.03 m (6 ft 8 in) | 335 cm (11 ft 0 in) | 330 cm (10 ft 10 in) | (Netherlands) Sliedrecht Sport |
| 13 | Ninomar Fairbairn | MB | 22 Jul 1991 | 1.87 m (6 ft 2 in) | 320 cm (10 ft 6 in) | 315 cm (10 ft 4 in) | (Netherlands) Sliedrecht Sport |
| 15 | Dimanche Elsevijf | OH | 7 Aug 2006 | 1.77 m (5 ft 10 in) | 315 cm (10 ft 4 in) | 310 cm (10 ft 2 in) | (Curaçao) Watakeli |

== Dominican Republic ==
The following is the Dominican Republic squad.

Head coach: (Dominican Republic) José Mason Torres

| No. | Name | Pos. | Date of birth | Height | Spike | Block | 2025–26 club |
|---|---|---|---|---|---|---|---|
| 2 | Luis David Renoso | OH | 4 Sep 2000 | 1.88 m (6 ft 2 in) | 330 cm (10 ft 10 in) | 320 cm (10 ft 6 in) | (Dominican Republic) Baní |
| 5 | Enger Mieses | L | 1 Dec 1995 | 1.71 m (5 ft 7 in) | 240 cm (7 ft 10 in) | | (Dominican Republic) Santo Domingo Men |
| 6 | Adrián Figueroa Lantigua | OP | 17 Sep 2003 | 1.95 m (6 ft 5 in) | 325 cm (10 ft 8 in) | 315 cm (10 ft 4 in) | (Dominican Republic) Moca |
| 7 | Cristofer Andujar | OH | 9 Dec 1994 | 1.80 m (5 ft 11 in) | 345 cm (11 ft 4 in) | 335 cm (11 ft 0 in) | (Dominican Republic) Voleibol Moca |
| 8 | Edward Rojas | OH | 14 Nov 2002 | 1.92 m (6 ft 4 in) | 320 cm (10 ft 6 in) | 310 cm (10 ft 2 in) | (Dominican Republic) Santiago de los Caballeros |
| 09 | Bismal Almonte | OH | 9 Apr 1999 | 1.83 m (6 ft 0 in) | 338 cm (11 ft 1 in) | 336 cm (11 ft 0 in) | (Dominican Republic) Monte Plata |
| 12 | Eliecer Alexander Ortiz | S | 27 Nov 2003 | 1.65 m (5 ft 5 in) | 230 cm (7 ft 7 in) | 220 cm (7 ft 3 in) | (Dominican Republic) Moca |
| 14 | Luke Ramirez | S | 12 Jun 2003 | 1.82 m (6 ft 0 in) | 325 cm (10 ft 8 in) | 305 cm (10 ft 0 in) | (Dominican Republic) Distrito Nacional |
| 15 | Luther Rosario Adames | MB | 5 Apr 2003 | 2.00 m (6 ft 7 in) | 335 cm (11 ft 0 in) | 315 cm (10 ft 4 in) | (Dominican Republic) Santo Dominigo Men |
| 18 | Moises Ortiz | MB | 3 Dec 2003 | 2.04 m (6 ft 8 in) | 360 cm (11 ft 10 in) | 350 cm (11 ft 6 in) | (Dominican Republic) Club Mauricio Baez |
| 19 | Héctor Alexis Cruz C | OH | 12 Jun 1997 | 1.87 m (6 ft 2 in) | 340 cm (11 ft 2 in) | 330 cm (10 ft 10 in) | (Dominican Republic) Yamasa |
| 21 | Ronny Molina | OH | 13 Jan 2004 | 1.90 m (6 ft 3 in) | 320 cm (10 ft 6 in) | 310 cm (10 ft 2 in) | (Dominican Republic) Santiago de los Caballeros |

== Guatemala ==
The following is the Guatemala squad.

Head coach: (Cuba) Reider Lucas

| No. | Name | Pos. | Date of birth | Height | Spike | Block | 2025–26 club |
|---|---|---|---|---|---|---|---|
| 2 | Carlos Lopez C | OH | 13 Jul 1997 | 1.82 m (6 ft 0 in) | 320 cm (10 ft 6 in) | 305 cm (10 ft 0 in) | (Guatemala) MYC |
| 3 | Adolfo Rivas | S | 3 May 2005 | 1.87 m (6 ft 2 in) | 310 cm (10 ft 2 in) | 290 cm (9 ft 6 in) | (Guatemala) MYC |
| 6 | José Samayoa | MB | 12 May 2006 | 1.86 m (6 ft 1 in) | 322 cm (10 ft 7 in) | 308 cm (10 ft 1 in) | (Guatemala) Maquinza |
| 8 | Juan Zuñiga | S | 4 Aug 2010 | 1.84 m (6 ft 0 in) | 307 cm (10 ft 1 in) | 297 cm (9 ft 9 in) | (Guatemala) Jutiapa |
| 9 | Daniel Delgado | L | 13 May 2004 | 1.78 m (5 ft 10 in) | 307 cm (10 ft 1 in) | 293 cm (9 ft 7 in) | (Guatemala) Maquinza |
| 10 | Jerry Duran | OH | 26 Sep 2004 | 1.78 m (5 ft 10 in) | 316 cm (10 ft 4 in) | 306 cm (10 ft 0 in) | (Guatemala) MYC |
| 11 | Andy Leonardo | OP | 27 Oct 1989 | 1.93 m (6 ft 4 in) | 340 cm (11 ft 2 in) | 320 cm (10 ft 6 in) | (Guatemala) MYC |
| 12 | Christian Alvarez | MB | 10 Aug 2007 | 1.90 m (6 ft 3 in) | 333 cm (10 ft 11 in) | 310 cm (10 ft 2 in) | (Guatemala) Maquinza |
| 15 | Jason Hernández | MB | 19 Jan 2002 | 1.94 m (6 ft 4 in) | 315 cm (10 ft 4 in) | 300 cm (9 ft 10 in) | (Guatemala) Bad Boys |
| 17 | Byron Izaguirre | L | 28 Sep 2009 | 1.78 m (5 ft 10 in) | 300 cm (9 ft 10 in) | 285 cm (9 ft 4 in) | (Guatemala) Bad Boys |
| 19 | Jose Carrillo | OP | 18 Jan 2001 | 1.80 m (5 ft 11 in) | 320 cm (10 ft 6 in) | 305 cm (10 ft 0 in) | (Guatemala) Big Bang |
| 21 | Adolfo Hernández | MB | 27 Jan 2004 | 1.89 m (6 ft 2 in) | 320 cm (10 ft 6 in) | 300 cm (9 ft 10 in) | (Guatemala) MYC |

== Mexico ==
The following is the Mexico squad.

Head coach: (Brazil) Carlos Schwanke

| No. | Name | Pos. | Date of birth | Height | Spike | Block | 2025–26 club |
|---|---|---|---|---|---|---|---|
| 1 | Gianluca Righetto | OH | 4 Sep 2002 | 1.92 m (6 ft 4 in) | 340 cm (11 ft 2 in) | 320 cm (10 ft 6 in) | (Mexico) Quintana Roo |
| 3 | Hiram Bravo Moreno | L | 19 Dec 1999 | 1.73 m (5 ft 8 in) | 234 cm (7 ft 8 in) | 226 cm (7 ft 5 in) | (Mexico) Mezcaleros |
| 5 | Victor Parra Valenzuela | MB | 3 Sep 1999 | 2.02 m (6 ft 8 in) | 348 cm (11 ft 5 in) | 325 cm (10 ft 8 in) | (Mexico) Mezcaleros |
| 6 | Josué López Ríos C | OH | 21 Jul 2002 | 1.97 m (6 ft 6 in) | 360 cm (11 ft 10 in) | 330 cm (10 ft 10 in) | (Portugal) Sporting CP |
| 7 | Diego González | OP | 15 Feb 2000 | 2.03 m (6 ft 8 in) | 365 cm (12 ft 0 in) | 350 cm (11 ft 6 in) | (Mexico) Nuevo León |
| 8 | Edgar Alejandro Mendoza Burgueño | S | 8 Jan 1999 | 1.97 m (6 ft 6 in) | 338 cm (11 ft 1 in) | 326 cm (10 ft 8 in) | (Mexico) Nayarit Voleibol |
| 9 | Axel Tellez | MB | 8 Oct 1999 | 2.03 m (6 ft 8 in) | 350 cm (11 ft 6 in) | 345 cm (11 ft 4 in) | (Mexico) Teruel |
| 11 | Brandon López Ríos | MB | 30 Aug 1996 | 1.97 m (6 ft 6 in) | 350 cm (11 ft 6 in) | 325 cm (10 ft 8 in) | (Mexico) Mezcaleros |
| 12 | Mauro Fuentes | OH | 13 Oct 1997 | 1.92 m (6 ft 4 in) | 300 cm (9 ft 10 in) | 290 cm (9 ft 6 in) | (Mexico) Guanajuato |
| 13 | Juan Garcia | MB | 24 Jun 2003 | 2.06 m (6 ft 9 in) | 360 cm (11 ft 10 in) | 350 cm (11 ft 6 in) | (Mexico) Neuvo Leon |
| 15 | Daniel Cravioto | MB | 11 Aug 2006 | 2.02 m (6 ft 8 in) | 300 cm (9 ft 10 in) | 270 cm (8 ft 10 in) | Mexico |
| 17 | Jesús Izaguirre Rodriguez | L | 7 Mar 1997 | 1.65 m (5 ft 5 in) | 300 cm (9 ft 10 in) | 280 cm (9 ft 2 in) | (Mexico) Mezcaleros |
| 47 | Franky Hernández Milantony | OH | 4 Mar 2002 | 1.94 m (6 ft 4 in) | 322 cm (10 ft 7 in) | 318 cm (10 ft 5 in) | (Mexico) Sinaloa |
| 96 | Miguel Garcia | S | 6 Dec 2001 | 1.90 m (6 ft 3 in) | 320 cm (10 ft 6 in) | 300 cm (9 ft 10 in) | (Mexico) Tigres |

== Puerto Rico ==
The following is the Puerto Rico squad.

Head coach: (Puerto Rico) Alberto Torres

| No. | Name | Pos. | Date of birth | Height | Spike | Block | 2025–26 club |
|---|---|---|---|---|---|---|---|
| 2 | Klistan Lawrence | OH | 7 Jan 2003 | 1.96 m (6 ft 5 in) | 297 cm (9 ft 9 in) | 275 cm (9 ft 0 in) | (Puerto Rico) National Team |
| 3 | Jair Santiago | OP | 24 Aug 1995 | 2.09 m (6 ft 10 in) | 310 cm (10 ft 2 in) | 302 cm (9 ft 11 in) | (Puerto Rico) National Team |
| 4 | Dennis Del Valle | L | 27 Jan 1989 | 1.75 m (5 ft 9 in) | 300 cm (9 ft 10 in) | 290 cm (9 ft 6 in) | (Puerto Rico) National Team |
| 5 | Daniel Henwood | S | 29 Dec 2005 | 1.83 m (6 ft 0 in) | 330 cm (10 ft 10 in) | 305 cm (10 ft 0 in) | (Puerto Rico) National Team |
| 9 | Pedro Molina | OH | 7 Apr 1999 | 2.01 m (6 ft 7 in) | 246 cm (8 ft 1 in) | 239 cm (7 ft 10 in) | (Puerto Rico) National Team |
| 10 | Gregory Torres | OP | 30 Nov 2003 | 1.91 m (6 ft 3 in) | 338 cm (11 ft 1 in) | 314 cm (10 ft 4 in) | (Puerto Rico) National Team |
| 14 | Pelegrin Vargas | OH | 31 Jul 1998 | 1.93 m (6 ft 4 in) | 242 cm (7 ft 11 in) | 236 cm (7 ft 9 in) | (Puerto Rico) National Team |
| 15 | Jonathan Rodriguez | MB | 16 Sep 1997 | 2.00 m (6 ft 7 in) | 304 cm (10 ft 0 in) | 285 cm (9 ft 4 in) | (Puerto Rico) National Team |
| 17 | Ismael Alomar | MB | 28 Jun 1996 | 1.89 m (6 ft 2 in) | 267 cm (8 ft 9 in) | 262 cm (8 ft 7 in) | (Puerto Rico) National Team |
| 24 | Amel Cabrera C | L | 11 Apr 2005 | 1.89 m (6 ft 2 in) | 245 cm (8 ft 0 in) | 239 cm (7 ft 10 in) | (Puerto Rico) National Team |
| 25 | Slava Eliel David | MB | 11 Apr 2005 | 1.97 m (6 ft 6 in) | 325 cm (10 ft 8 in) | 308 cm (10 ft 1 in) | (Puerto Rico) National Team |
| 44 | Janluar Figueroa Torrens | MB | 30 Mar 2006 | 1.96 m (6 ft 5 in) | 335 cm (11 ft 0 in) | 325 cm (10 ft 8 in) | (Puerto Rico) National Team |
| 55 | Kevin Rodríguez | S | 12 Aug 1994 | 1.94 m (6 ft 4 in) | 328 cm (10 ft 9 in) | 302 cm (9 ft 11 in) | (Puerto Rico) Mets de Guaynabo |

== United States ==
The following is the United States squad.

Head coach: (United States) Karch Kiraly

| No. | Name | Pos. | Date of birth | Height | Spike | Block | 2025–26 club |
|---|---|---|---|---|---|---|---|
| 1 | Matthew Anderson | OP | 18 Apr 1987 | 2.02 m (6 ft 8 in) | 360 cm (11 ft 10 in) | 332 cm (10 ft 11 in) | (Japan) Nippon Steel Sakai Blazers |
| 3 | Mason Briggs | L | 21 Jan 2001 | 1.82 m (6 ft 0 in) | 320 cm (10 ft 6 in) | 300 cm (9 ft 10 in) | (France) Nice Volley-Ball |
| 4 | Jeffrey Jendryk | MB | 15 Sep 1995 | 2.08 m (6 ft 10 in) | 353 cm (11 ft 7 in) | 345 cm (11 ft 4 in) | (Greece) P.A.O.K. V.C. |
| 7 | Jacob Pasteur | OH | 5 Jun 2002 | 1.93 m (6 ft 4 in) | 360 cm (11 ft 10 in) | 340 cm (11 ft 2 in) | (France) Chaumont Volley-Ball 52 |
| 8 | Patrick Rogers | OH | 15 Jul 2004 | 2.01 m (6 ft 7 in) | 353 cm (11 ft 7 in) | 325 cm (10 ft 8 in) | (United States) Ball State University |
| 11 | Michael Marshman | MB | 27 Jul 1994 | 2.01 m (6 ft 7 in) | 354 cm (11 ft 7 in) | 334 cm (10 ft 11 in) | (France) Tours VB |
| 14 | Micah Maʻa | S | 16 Apr 1997 | 1.92 m (6 ft 4 in) | 333 cm (10 ft 11 in) | 318 cm (10 ft 5 in) | (Turkey) Halkbank |
| 15 | Andrew Rowan | S | 29 Jul 2003 | 2.01 m (6 ft 7 in) | 356 cm (11 ft 8 in) | 345 cm (11 ft 4 in) | (United States) UCLA |
| 17 | Jake Hanes | OP | 3 May 1998 | 2.10 m (6 ft 11 in) | 361 cm (11 ft 10 in) | 341 cm (11 ft 2 in) | (Poland) BBTS Bielsko-Biała |
| 18 | Cole Hartke | OP | 20 Apr 2006 | 2.11 m (6 ft 11 in) | 378 cm (12 ft 5 in) | 368 cm (12 ft 1 in) | (United States) Pepperdine University |
| 22 | Erik Shoji | L | 24 Aug 1989 | 1.84 m (6 ft 0 in) | 330 cm (10 ft 10 in) | 321 cm (10 ft 6 in) | (Poland) ZAKSA Kędzierzyn-Koźle |
| 24 | Merrick McHenry | MB | 17 Oct 2000 | 2.00 m (6 ft 7 in) | 351 cm (11 ft 6 in) | 335 cm (11 ft 0 in) | (France) Nice Volley-Ball |
| 26 | Matthew Knigge | MB | 2 Jun 1996 | 2.01 m (6 ft 7 in) | 362 cm (11 ft 11 in) | 342 cm (11 ft 3 in) | (Germany) Berlin Recycling Volleys |
| 29 | Jordan Ewert | OH | 18 Mar 1997 | 1.95 m (6 ft 5 in) | 345 cm (11 ft 4 in) | 325 cm (10 ft 8 in) | (Turkey) Altekma |

== See also ==
- 2026 Women's NORCECA Volleyball Championship squads
