= Clement Lemieux =

Canadian volleyball coach (born 1961)

Personal information
- Born: 1961 (age 64–65)
- Hometown: Laval, Quebec Canada
- Education: Cégep Limoilou

Coaching information
Previous teams coached
Years	Teams
1983–1985; 1985–1992; 1992–1996; 1999–2002	Cégep Limoilou; Université Laval; Canada; Université de Sherbrooke
Honours
Men's volleyball
Head coach Canada
NORCECA Championship
Bronze medal – third place	1993 New Orleans
Bronze medal – third place	1995 Edmonton
- Last updated: 5 July 2025

Clement Lemieux is a Canadian former volleyball coach. He coached the Canada men's national volleyball team at the 1994 FIVB World Championship. He was inducted into the Québec Volleyball Hall of Fame in 2014.

== Career ==
=== Player ===
Lemieux played volleyball as a youth with Volleyball Club Citadelles de Québec and in college at Cégep Limoilou. Lemieux stopped playing volleyball due to injuries and turned to coaching.

=== Coach ===
Lemieux began his coaching career at Cégep Limoilou in 1983. Under his leadership, Lemieux coached the team to back-to-back CCAA national championships while also winning the 1985 CCAA Coaching Excellence Award.

Next, Lemieux was appointed head coach at the university level for the Université Laval Rouge et Or men's volleyball team. In 1990 Lemieux led the Rouge et Or to their first CIAU National Championship - Gino Brousseau, who played for Lemieux at Limoilou as well as Laval, was the Championship MVP. For the 1990-91 and 1991-92 seasons, Lemieux was named the CIAU coach of the year. In 1992, Laval won their second CIAU national championship with Lemieux, beating the Calgary Dinosaurs in the final.

Following his success at Laval, Lemieux was appointed head coach of the Canada men's national volleyball team in 1992. He coached the national team at the 1994 FIVB World Championship, as well as the 1993 and 1995 NORCECA Championships.

In 1999, Lemieux joined the Université de Sherbrooke men's volleyball team, replacing outgoing coach Glenn Hoag. He coached there until 2002.

== Honours ==
=== Club ===
- 1984–85 CCAA Championship, with Cégep Limoilou
- 1985–86 CCAA Championship, with Cégep Limoilou
- 1989–90 CIAU Championship, with Laval Rouge et Or
- 1991–92 CIAU Championship, with Laval Rouge et Or

=== Individual awards ===
- 1984–85 CCAA Coach of the Year
- 1990–91 CIAU Coach of the Year
- 1991–92 CIAU Coach of the Year

Sporting positions
Preceded by (Canada) Brian Watson	Head coach of Canada; 1992–1996	Succeeded by (Canada) Garth Pischke
