= 2021 Men's NORCECA Volleyball Championship squads =

National team squads for 2023 NORCECA Championship

This article shows the rosters of all teams that participated at the 2021 Men's NORCECA Volleyball Championship in Durango City, Mexico.

== Canada ==
The following is the Canada squad.

Head coach: Larry McKay

No.	Name	Pos.	Date of birth	Height	Weight	Spike	Block	2020–21 club
3	Jesse Elser	OH	27 May 1999	2.03 m (6 ft 8 in)	86 kg (190 lb)	342 cm (135 in)	315 cm (124 in)	(Canada) Trinity Western Spartans
5	Jackson Howe	MB	16 June 1998	1.92 m (6 ft 4 in)	91 kg (201 lb)	366 cm (144 in)	334 cm (131 in)	(Canada) Trinity Western Spartans
6	Jordan Pereira	L	8 March 1998	1.83 m (6 ft 0 in)	72 kg (159 lb)	323 cm (127 in)	297 cm (117 in)	(Canada) McMaster Marauders
7	Pearson Eshenko	MB	16 October 1997	2.04 m (6 ft 8 in)	96 kg (212 lb)	360 cm (140 in)	336 cm (132 in)	(Germany) Helios Grizzlys
8	Justin Lui	L	8 May 2000	1.78 m (5 ft 10 in)	68 kg (150 lb)	304 cm (120 in)	283 cm (111 in)	(United States) Stanford Cardinal
10	Brodie Hofer	OH	27 April 2000	1.99 m (6 ft 6 in)	92 kg (203 lb)	351 cm (138 in)	320 cm (130 in)	(Canada) Trinity Western Spartans
11	Xander Ketrzynski	OP	27 January 2000	2.08 m (6 ft 10 in)	100 kg (220 lb)	359 cm (141 in)	330 cm (130 in)	(Qatar) Al Sadd
12	Jackson Bere	MB	7 February 2000	1.99 m (6 ft 6 in)	99 kg (218 lb)	351 cm (138 in)	322 cm (127 in)	Team Canada
13	Fynn McCarthy	MB	4 December 1999	2.00 m (6 ft 7 in)	89 kg (196 lb)	362 cm (143 in)	321 cm (126 in)	Team Canada
14	Eric Loeppky	OH	1 August 1998	1.97 m (6 ft 6 in)	89 kg (196 lb)	348 cm (137 in)	325 cm (128 in)	(Italy) Consar Ravenna
17	Brandon Koppers	OH	9 September 1995	2.00 m (6 ft 7 in)	90 kg (198 lb)	345 cm (136 in)	331 cm (130 in)	(Italy) Consar Ravenna
21	Brett Walsh C	S	19 February 1994	1.95 m (6 ft 5 in)	84 kg (185 lb)	332 cm (131 in)	313 cm (123 in)	(Turkey) Halkbank Ankara
23	Danny Demyanenko	MB	13 July 1994	1.94 m (6 ft 4 in)	101 kg (223 lb)	357 cm (141 in)	325 cm (128 in)	(France) Montpellier HSC
24	Mathias Elser	S	3 June 2001	1.98 m (6 ft 6 in)	76 kg (168 lb)	340 cm (130 in)	312 cm (123 in)	(Canada) Trinity Western Spartans

== Cuba ==
The following is the Cuba squad.

Head coach: Yosvani Muñoz Perez

No.	Name	Pos.	Date of birth	Height	Weight	Spike	Block
1	José Massó	MB	2 December 1997	1.99 m (6 ft 6 in)	79 kg (174 lb)	349 cm (137 in)	347 cm (137 in)
2	Alexei Ramírez	L	21 June 2001	1.94 m (6 ft 4 in)	76 kg (168 lb)	340 cm (130 in)	336 cm (132 in)
3	Julio Cesar Cardenas	OH	4 September 2000	1.90 m (6 ft 3 in)	72 kg (159 lb)	345 cm (136 in)	320 cm (130 in)
7	Yonder Garcia	L	26 February 1993	1.83 m (6 ft 0 in)	78 kg (172 lb)	325 cm (128 in)	320 cm (130 in)
10	Miguel Gutierrez	OP	21 February 1997	1.97 m (6 ft 6 in)	86 kg (190 lb)	340 cm (130 in)	355 cm (140 in)
11	Liván Taboada	S	4 October 1998	1.91 m (6 ft 3 in)	75 kg (165 lb)	343 cm (135 in)	327 cm (129 in)
12	Jesus Herrera	OP	4 April 1995	1.94 m (6 ft 4 in)	85 kg (187 lb)	340 cm (130 in)	336 cm (132 in)
13	Carlos Yoandrys Charles	OP	4 October 2000	1.91 m (6 ft 3 in)	75 kg (165 lb)	345 cm (136 in)	338 cm (133 in)
14	Adrián Goide	S	26 June 1998	1.91 m (6 ft 3 in)	80 kg (176 lb)	344 cm (135 in)	340 cm (130 in)
15	Alejandro Rodriguez Fuentes	OP	20 January 2002	1.96 m (6 ft 5 in)	98 kg (216 lb)	342 cm (135 in)	354 cm (139 in)
16	Yohan Armando Leon	OH	24 January 1995	2.00 m (6 ft 7 in)	98 kg (216 lb)	345 cm (136 in)	340 cm (130 in)
18	Miguel Ángel López C	OH	25 March 1997	1.89 m (6 ft 2 in)	75 kg (165 lb)	345 cm (136 in)	320 cm (130 in)
19	Endriel Alberto Pedroso	MB	5 April 2002	2.09 m (6 ft 10 in)	110 kg (243 lb)	342 cm (135 in)	345 cm (136 in)
25	Tomas Alejandro Lescay	OP	6 July 2000	1.95 m (6 ft 5 in)	90 kg (198 lb)	356 cm (140 in)	342 cm (135 in)

== Dominican Republic ==
The following is the Dominican Republic squad.

Head coach: Jose Mañon

No.	Name	Pos.	Date of birth	Height	Weight	Spike	Block
1	Henry Tapia C	OP	1 March 1992	1.98 m (6 ft 6 in)	88 kg (194 lb)	345 cm (136 in)	335 cm (132 in)
2	Luis David Reinoso	OH	4 September 2000	1.88 m (6 ft 2 in)	68 kg (150 lb)	330 cm (130 in)	320 cm (130 in)
3	Bismal Rafael Almonte	OP	9 April 1999	1.83 m (6 ft 0 in)	73 kg (161 lb)	338 cm (133 in)	336 cm (132 in)
4	Wilfrido Hernández	OH	8 December 1990	1.95 m (6 ft 5 in)	89 kg (196 lb)	360 cm (140 in)	350 cm (140 in)
5	Erik Florian	L	20 August 2001	1.84 m (6 ft 0 in)	70 kg (154 lb)	230 cm (91 in)	227 cm (89 in)
6	Dawilin Ramill Mendez	MB	6 January 2002	1.95 m (6 ft 5 in)	76 kg (168 lb)	255 cm (100 in)	252 cm (99 in)
7	Bryan Turbides Pepén	L	29 September 2001	1.77 m (5 ft 10 in)	58 kg (128 lb)	228 cm (90 in)	225 cm (89 in)
8	Henry López	OH	9 December 1994	1.85 m (6 ft 1 in)	71 kg (157 lb)	245 cm (96 in)	235 cm (93 in)
9	Jhoan Jesus Capellan	S	6 April 2001	1.75 m (5 ft 9 in)	54 kg (119 lb)	230 cm (91 in)	225 cm (89 in)
11	Juan José De Jesús Hernández	S	14 November 1994	1.91 m (6 ft 3 in)	79 kg (174 lb)	249 cm (98 in)	239 cm (94 in)
13	Jonathan Mercedes	OH	18 August 1989	1.87 m (6 ft 2 in)	85 kg (187 lb)	345 cm (136 in)	318 cm (125 in)
14	Felix Miguel Romero	MB	2 May 1995	1.91 m (6 ft 3 in)	72 kg (159 lb)	352 cm (139 in)	250 cm (98 in)
18	Richi Paulino	MB	2 December 1996	2.06 m (6 ft 9 in)	87 kg (192 lb)	350 cm (140 in)	330 cm (130 in)
19	Hector Alexis Cruz	OH	12 June 1997	1.87 m (6 ft 2 in)	83 kg (183 lb)	340 cm (130 in)	330 cm (130 in)

== Guatemala ==
The following is the Guatemala squad.

Head coach: (Cuba) William Fernandez Pizat

No.	Name	Pos.	Date of birth	Height	Weight	Spike	Block
2	Carlos Fernando Lopez Santiago C	OH	13 July 1997	1.83 m (6 ft 0 in)	88 kg (194 lb)	315 cm (124 in)	295 cm (116 in)
4	Axel Enrique Menendez Burgos	OH	29 June 1993	1.77 m (5 ft 10 in)	70 kg (154 lb)	320 cm (130 in)	310 cm (120 in)
7	Adan Andree Ruano Poron	S	10 March 1998	1.75 m (5 ft 9 in)	80 kg (176 lb)	308 cm (121 in)	290 cm (110 in)
8	Luis Fernando Santa Cruz Molina	L	18 November 1998	1.76 m (5 ft 9 in)	68 kg (150 lb)	300 cm (120 in)	285 cm (112 in)
10	Leonel Antonio Aragon Lopez	MB	20 October 1995	2.00 m (6 ft 7 in)	90 kg (198 lb)	325 cm (128 in)	305 cm (120 in)
11	Mario Salomon Gonzalez Alvarez	MB	2 December 2001	1.84 m (6 ft 0 in)	81 kg (179 lb)	315 cm (124 in)	296 cm (117 in)
12	Tirso Ivan Pineda Lopez	OH	22 September 1984	1.73 m (5 ft 8 in)	78 kg (172 lb)	300 cm (120 in)	285 cm (112 in)
15	Jason Omar Hernández de León	MB	19 January 2002	1.94 m (6 ft 4 in)	92 kg (203 lb)	335 cm (132 in)	312 cm (123 in)
17	Gerardo Antonio Gonzalez Paz	OH	13 July 1994	1.82 m (6 ft 0 in)	75 kg (165 lb)	310 cm (120 in)	300 cm (120 in)
19	Jose Rodrigo Carrillo Valiente	OP	18 January 2001	1.82 m (6 ft 0 in)	81 kg (179 lb)	335 cm (132 in)	315 cm (124 in)
21	Jose Andres Salas Fagiani	MB	4 March 2002	1.91 m (6 ft 3 in)	89 kg (196 lb)	315 cm (124 in)	295 cm (116 in)

== Mexico ==
The following is the Mexico squad.

Head coach: Jorge Miguel Azair Lopez

No.	Name	Pos.	Date of birth	Height	Weight	Spike	Block
2	Jorge Ariel Hernandez Cabrera	OH	14 August 2003	1.98 m (6 ft 6 in)	80 kg (176 lb)	336 cm (132 in)	328 cm (129 in)
3	Ridl Garay	OP	9 June 1997	1.94 m (6 ft 4 in)	74 kg (163 lb)	326 cm (128 in)	299 cm (118 in)
5	Victor Manuel Parra Valenzuela	MB	3 September 1999	2.00 m (6 ft 7 in)	87 kg (192 lb)	330 cm (130 in)	300 cm (120 in)
7	Diego Gonzalez Castaneda	OP	15 February 2000	1.97 m (6 ft 6 in)	75 kg (165 lb)	333 cm (131 in)	322 cm (127 in)
8	Mauro Isaac Fuentes Rascon	OH	13 October 1997	1.85 m (6 ft 1 in)	92 kg (203 lb)	300 cm (120 in)	290 cm (110 in)
9	Axel Manuel Tellez Rodriguez	MB	8 October 1999	1.99 m (6 ft 6 in)	100 kg (220 lb)	328 cm (129 in)	306 cm (120 in)
10	Pedro Rangel C	S	16 September 1988	1.92 m (6 ft 4 in)	85 kg (187 lb)	340 cm (130 in)	324 cm (128 in)
13	Alan Gabriel Martinez	L	21 January 1995	1.87 m (6 ft 2 in)	79 kg (174 lb)	318 cm (125 in)	289 cm (114 in)
14	Gabriel Cruz Mendoza	MB	23 May 1996	1.96 m (6 ft 5 in)	90 kg (198 lb)	300 cm (120 in)	250 cm (98 in)
15	Christian Aranda	S	9 April 1997	1.90 m (6 ft 3 in)	65 kg (143 lb)	322 cm (127 in)	288 cm (113 in)
16	Miguel Antonio Chávez Pasos	MB	13 May 1996	2.02 m (6 ft 8 in)	73 kg (161 lb)	335 cm (132 in)	293 cm (115 in)
20	José Mendoza Perdomo	L	31 May 1993	1.70 m (5 ft 7 in)	71 kg (157 lb)	290 cm (110 in)	265 cm (104 in)
23	Josue De Jesus Lopez Rios	OH	21 July 2002	1.95 m (6 ft 5 in)	83 kg (183 lb)	312 cm (123 in)	328 cm (129 in)
25	Francisco Eduardo Olvera Sanchez	OH	24 September 1995	1.85 m (6 ft 1 in)	80 kg (176 lb)	290 cm (110 in)	275 cm (108 in)

== Puerto Rico ==
The following is the Puerto Rico squad.

Head coach: Oswald Irwin Antonetti Cameron

No.	Name	Pos.	Date of birth	Height	Weight	Spike	Block
1	Gabriel García Fernández	OP	8 January 1999	1.98 m (6 ft 6 in)	92 kg (203 lb)	242 cm (95 in)	237 cm (93 in)
4	Dennis Del Valle	L	27 January 1989	1.75 m (5 ft 9 in)	58 kg (128 lb)	300 cm (120 in)	290 cm (110 in)
5	Pedro Nieves	MB	29 June 1993	1.98 m (6 ft 6 in)	92 kg (203 lb)	312 cm (123 in)	305 cm (120 in)
7	Arturo Iglesias C	S	22 November 1995	1.97 m (6 ft 6 in)	88 kg (194 lb)	246 cm (97 in)	243 cm (96 in)
9	Pedro Molina	OH	7 April 1999	1.92 m (6 ft 4 in)	81 kg (179 lb)	246 cm (97 in)	239 cm (94 in)
10	Adrian Iglesias Pastrana	OH	14 February 1998	1.89 m (6 ft 2 in)	78 kg (172 lb)	262 cm (103 in)	257 cm (101 in)
13	Roque Nido Alvarez	S	8 December 1999	1.86 m (6 ft 1 in)	83 kg (183 lb)	248 cm (98 in)	242 cm (95 in)
14	Pelegrin Vargas	OH	31 July 1998	1.93 m (6 ft 4 in)	87 kg (192 lb)	242 cm (95 in)	236 cm (93 in)
15	Jonathan Rodriguez	MB	16 September 1997	1.93 m (6 ft 4 in)	82 kg (181 lb)	243 cm (96 in)	238 cm (94 in)
17	Kevin Lopez	OH	24 April 1995	1.98 m (6 ft 6 in)	81 kg (179 lb)	245 cm (96 in)	238 cm (94 in)
18	Ismael Alomar	MB	28 June 1996	1.89 m (6 ft 2 in)	82 kg (181 lb)	267 cm (105 in)	262 cm (103 in)
25	Jair Santiago	OP	24 August 1995	2.05 m (6 ft 9 in)	86 kg (190 lb)	310 cm (120 in)	302 cm (119 in)

== Trinidad and Tobago ==
The following is the Trinidad and Tobago squad.

Head coach: Gideon Dickson

No.	Name	Pos.	Date of birth	Height	Weight	Spike	Block
2	Darnell David	OH	7 December 1991	1.80 m (5 ft 11 in)	73 kg (161 lb)	355 cm (140 in)	345 cm (136 in)
4	Newton Grant	OH	31 May 1995	1.84 m (6 ft 0 in)	77 kg (170 lb)	356 cm (140 in)	346 cm (136 in)
5	Akim Bushe	MB	28 April 1992	1.96 m (6 ft 5 in)	84 kg (185 lb)	360 cm (140 in)	365 cm (144 in)
6	Adriel Roberts	MB	2 November 1997	1.96 m (6 ft 5 in)	77 kg (170 lb)	332 cm (131 in)	325 cm (128 in)
8	Kameron Donald	S	2 November 1998	1.88 m (6 ft 2 in)	76 kg (168 lb)	358 cm (141 in)	346 cm (136 in)
9	Joel Theodore	OP	12 June 1995	1.95 m (6 ft 5 in)	90 kg (198 lb)	368 cm (145 in)	358 cm (141 in)
11	Ryan Stewart C	OP	6 August 1990	1.94 m (6 ft 4 in)	91 kg (201 lb)	371 cm (146 in)	356 cm (140 in)
13	Daynte Stewart	OH	12 October 2000	1.76 m (5 ft 9 in)	66 kg (146 lb)	237 cm (93 in)	226 cm (89 in)
18	Brandon Legall	L	8 July 1993	1.80 m (5 ft 11 in)	79 kg (174 lb)	359 cm (141 in)	347 cm (137 in)
19	Enrique Harry	OP	24 August 1996	1.94 m (6 ft 4 in)	85 kg (187 lb)	368 cm (145 in)	353 cm (139 in)

== United States ==
The following is the United States squad.

Head coach: Andy Read

No.	Name	Pos.	Date of birth	Height	Weight	Spike	Block	2020–21 club
3	Spencer Olivier	OH	5 January 1999	1.98 m (6 ft 6 in)	78 kg (172 lb)	355 cm (140 in)	317 cm (125 in)	(United States) Long Beach State
5	Camden Gianni	OH	12 November 1999	1.96 m (6 ft 5 in)	93 kg (205 lb)	351 cm (138 in)	333 cm (131 in)	(United States) Grand Canyon University
6	Samuel Kobrine	S	26 May 1998	1.91 m (6 ft 3 in)	86 kg (190 lb)	323 cm (127 in)	310 cm (120 in)	(United States) USC
7	William Rottman	OH	29 June 2001	1.98 m (6 ft 6 in)	80 kg (176 lb)	340 cm (130 in)	320 cm (130 in)	(United States) Stanford University
8	Tyler Mitchem	MB	24 May 1998	2.08 m (6 ft 10 in)	102 kg (225 lb)	353 cm (139 in)	340 cm (130 in)	(United States) Lewis University
9	Jake Hanes	OP	3 May 1998	2.08 m (6 ft 10 in)	102 kg (225 lb)	366 cm (144 in)	353 cm (139 in)	(France) Arago de Sète
12	Brett Wildman	OH	6 March 2000	1.96 m (6 ft 5 in)	88 kg (194 lb)	351 cm (138 in)	335 cm (132 in)	(United States) Penn State University
13	Merrick McHenry	MB	17 October 2000	2.00 m (6 ft 7 in)	75 kg (165 lb)	351 cm (138 in)	335 cm (132 in)	(United States) UCLA
15	Jalen Penrose	OP	9 December 1994	2.07 m (6 ft 9 in)	85 kg (187 lb)	365 cm (144 in)	347 cm (137 in)	(Germany) TSV Herrsching
16	Joshua Tuaniga C	S	18 March 1997	1.91 m (6 ft 3 in)	102 kg (225 lb)	320 cm (130 in)	307 cm (121 in)	(Poland) MKS Ślepsk Suwałki
19	Keenan Sanders	MB	10 August 1998	1.98 m (6 ft 6 in)	89 kg (196 lb)	359 cm (141 in)	345 cm (136 in)	(United States) UC Santa Barbara
20	Austin Wilmot	MB	15 March 1998	2.08 m (6 ft 10 in)	115 kg (254 lb)	349 cm (137 in)	337 cm (133 in)	(United States) Pepperdine University
24	Kyle Dagostino	L	18 May 1995	1.75 m (5 ft 9 in)	75 kg (165 lb)	312 cm (123 in)	307 cm (121 in)	(Slovenia) ACH Volley
25	Mason Briggs	L	21 January 2001	1.83 m (6 ft 0 in)	70 kg (154 lb)	319 cm (126 in)	301 cm (119 in)	(United States) Long Beach State

== See also ==
- 2021 Women's NORCECA Volleyball Championship squads
