= Paul Duerden =

Canadian volleyball player (born 1974)

Personal information
- Full name: Paul Charles Duerden
- Born: 22 October 1974 (age 52); London, Ontario, Canada
- Hometown: London, Ontario
- Height: 1.95 m (6 ft 5 in)
- Weight: 100 kg (220 lb)
- Spike: 358 cm (11 ft 9 in)
- Block: 320 cm (10 ft 6 in)

Volleyball information
- Position: Outside hitter

Career
Years	Teams
1996–1997; 1997–1998; 1998–1999; 1999–2002; 2002–2003; 2003–2006; 2006–2010	SV Fellbach; Knack Roeselare; Stade Poitevin; Paris Volley; Volley Lupi Santa Croce; Stade Poitevin; Arkas Spor

National team
1993–2008	Canada
Honours
Men's volleyball
Representing Canada
NORCECA Championship
Silver medal – second place	2003 Culiacan
Bronze medal – third place	1997 San Juan
Bronze medal – third place	1999 Monterrey
Bronze medal – third place	2005 Winnipeg
Pan American Games
Bronze medal – third place	1999 Winnipeg

Paul Charles Duerden (born October 22, 1974) is a Canadian former professional volleyball player. He played for the Canada men's national volleyball team between 1993 and 2008, representing Canada at the 1994, 1998, 2002, and 2006 FIVB World Championships.

== Career ==
=== Club ===
Duerden played professionally in Europe from 1996 to 2010, playing for clubs in Germany, Belgium, France, Italy, and Turkey.

He won the 2008–09 GM Capital Challenge Cup playing with Arkas Spor Izmir and was awarded "Most Valuable Player".

=== National team ===
Duerden joined the Canada men's national volleyball team at the age of 18. He was inducted into the Volleyball Canada Hall of Fame in 2018.

== Honours ==
=== Club ===
- Continental
  - 1997–98 CEV Challenge Cup, with Knack Roeselare
  - 1999–00 CEV Cup, with Paris Volley
  - 2000–01 CEV Champions League, with Paris Volley
  - 2000–01 European Supercup, with Paris Volley
  - 2008–09 CEV Challenge Cup, with Arkas Spor
- Domestic
  - 1997–98 Belgian League, with Knack Roeselare
  - 1998–99 French League, with Stade Poitevin
  - 1999–00 French League, with Paris Volley
  - 1999–00 French Cup, with Paris Volley
  - 2000–01 French League, with Paris Volley
  - 2000–01 French Cup, with Paris Volley
  - 2001–02 French League, with Paris Volley
  - 2004–05 French Cup, with Stade Poitevin
  - 2005–06 French Cup, with Stade Poitevin
  - 2006–07 Turkish League, with Arkas Spor
  - 2007–08 Turkish League, with Arkas Spor
  - 2007–08 Turkish Cup, with Arkas Spor
  - 2008–09 Turkish League, with Arkas Spor
  - 2008–09 Turkish Cup, with Arkas Spor
  - 2009–10 Turkish Supercup, with Arkas Spor

=== Individual awards ===
- 1999–00 CEV Cup – Best blocker
- 1999–00 CEV Cup – Most valuable player
- 2000–01 European Supercup - Most valuable player
- 2000–01 CEV Champions League - Best server
- 2006–07 Turkish League - Best scorer
- 2008–09 CEV Challenge Cup - Most valuable player
