= Iznaga =

Iznaga is a surname. Notable people with the surname include:

- Arián Iznaga, Cuban Paralympian athlete
- Pedro Iznaga (born 1986), Cuban volleyball player

== See also ==
- Trinidad, Cuba
