= Pischke =

Pischke is a surname. Notable people with the surname include:

- Garth Pischke (born 1955), Canadian volleyball coach
- Taylor Pischke (born 1993), Canadian volleyball player
- Tom Pischke (born 1982), American politician
