= Leo Carroll =

Leo Carroll may refer to:

- Leo Carroll (American football) (born 1944), former American football defensive end
- Leo Carroll (volleyball) (born 1983), volleyball player from Canada
- Leo G. Carroll (1886–1972), English actor
