= Garth Pischke =

Canadian volleyball coach

Personal information
- Full name: Garth Pischke
- Born: August 12, 1955 (age 71); Winnipeg, Manitoba, Canada
- Hometown: Winnipeg, Manitoba
- Height: 1.94 m (6 ft 4 in)
- Weight: 84 kg (185 lb)
- Spike: 364 cm (143 in)
- Block: 351 cm (138 in)
- Education: University of Winnipeg; University of Manitoba

Coaching information
- Current team: Retired
Previous teams coached
Years	Teams
1978–1997; 1996–2000; 2000-2020	Manitoba Bisons; Canada Men's Volleyball; Manitoba Bisons

Volleyball information
- Position: Attacker
- Number: 5

National team
1973–1984	Canada
Honours
Representing Canada
Men's Volleyball
NORCECA Championship
Silver medal – second place	1997 Caguas
Bronze medal – third place	1999 Monterrey
Pan American Games
Bronze medal – third place	1999 Winnipeg
- Last updated: April 2, 2020

Garth Pischke (born August 12, 1955) is a Canadian volleyball coach. He is a former head coach of the University of Manitoba men's volleyball team.

== Playing career ==
Pischke played for the University of Winnipeg and University of Manitoba in his university career, winning the CIS championship three times. After university, Garth played professionally in the International Volleyball Association for both El Paso and Denver, where he was both rookie of the year and MVP. On the international level, Garth Pischke represented Team Canada at two Olympic games. He played for both the youth and junior national teams, and was named to the 1976 Olympic Men's Volleyball team in his grade 12 year.

== Coaching career ==
Pischke began his coaching career with the University of Manitoba Bisons in 1978, when he was just 23 years old. He coached them for 38 years, retiring at the end of the 2019-20 season. During Pischke's 38 years as the Bison men's volleyball head coach, the Bisons qualified for the U SPORTS National Championships 28 times, including a streak of 14 straight years winning a medal at the Championship as well as a streak of 19 straight seasons of qualifying for the National Championship. With Pischke at the helm, the Manitoba Bisons collected nine U SPORTS gold medals, nine U SPORTS silver medals, five U SPORTS bronze medal, two fourth place finishes, and two fifth place finishes and 1 no result due to COVID-19, in 28 appearances at the U SPORTS National Championships.In addition, Pischke has been selected as U SPORTS Coach of the Year a record six times (1981–82, 1983–84, 1987–88, 1989–90, 1994–95, 2016–17).

Pischke reached the milestone plateau of his 1,000th coaching victory with the Bisons on November 9, 2003 with a victory over the Trinity Western Spartans during the 2003-04 season. He captured 1,100 win when Manitoba defeated Laval 3-2 (23-25, 25-20, 25-22, 19-25, 15-7) on January 6, 2007 at Excalibur Volleyball Classic tournament title held at York University. Another milestone was achieved in the 2011-12 season as he captured his 1,200th victory when the Bisons defeated the No. 1 ranked Trinity Western Spartans by a 3-1 (25-21, 25-19, 25-17) score on January 27, 2012 at the Investors Group Athletic Centre.

The Winnipeg native reached a phenomenal milestone in the 2014-15 season. Pischke captured his 1,240th victory during league action win a 3-0 win (25-17, 25-17, 25-18) over the University of Regina on Oct. 18, 2014. At that point, he surpassed the old mark set by UCLA legendary coach Al Scates to establish the new North American all-time coaching match win record for men's volleyball.

On January 14, 2017 at home against UBC, Pischke reached the milestone plateau with his 1,300 overall match win when the Bisons won 3-1 (25-23, 27-29, 25-16, 25-23).

At the completion of the 2019-20 U SPORTS Men's Volleyball season, Pischke finished with an overall coaching match record at 1,361-419 (76.5% winning percentage). This is the most overall coaching wins by a U SPORTS head coach in history.

On the international level, Pischke coached the Canadian men's national team from 1996 to 2000. During that period the team rose from the 21st ranked team in the world to the 10th ranked team in the world.

Pischke's background with volleyball did not start with coaching. His volleyball career began as an elite middle blocker where he has won many National Championships as a player. These include three Canadian Under-20 Championships, three U SPORTS Championships, five Volleyball Canada Open Championships, and three USVBA Open Championships. Pischke was a member of the Canadian Olympic Team at the 1976 Montreal Olympics and the 1984 Los Angeles Olympics. He also played professional volleyball in the United States (El Paso and Denver) in the International Volleyball Association (IVA), where he was named League Rookie in 1978 and League MVP in 1979.

Individually, he has been named to 12 All-Star Teams at Canadian National Championships where he received six MVP awards. Pischke was named All-American at eight USVBA Championships and awarded an MVP award. He has won 30 National Championships including the 1991 Canadian Beach Doubles Championship.

Pischke was inducted into the Manitoba Sports Hall of Fame as an athlete in 1989, again in 2012 in the team category as a coach, and again in 2016 in the team category as a player, the Canadian Olympic Hall of Fame in 1999, the Canadian Volleyball Hall of Fame in 2000 as an athlete, and again in 2019 in the team category, the Manitoba High Schools Athletic Association Hall of Fame in 2009; honored with the Royal Canadian Legion Sports Foundation C.A.P. award, and his greatest accomplishment was being named MANITOBA'S AMATEUR ATHLETE OF THE 20th CENTURY in the fall of 2000. In 2000, True North Volleyball Magazine named Pischke as "Canada's Best Male Volleyball Player" of all time.

He joins the company of Canadian athletes and builders who have, over the course of their career, distinguished themselves in Olympic and Pan American competition or contributed to the growth and development of the Olympic movement.

== Personal life ==
Pischke is married to the former Cindy Shepherd, a three time U SPORTS National Champion at the University of Saskatchewan and Junior National Team player. The couple have been married for 38 years (1985). They have two children, Dane and Taylor. Dane holds a Business Degree from the I.H. Asper School of Business at the University of Manitoba and has successfully completed his CPA designation. He currently works full-time with the R.M. of East St. Paul as the Chief Financial Officer. Dane was a member of the University of Manitoba Bisons for five years. He was named a first team All-Canadian in both of his final two seasons. Taylor completed her undergraduate degree at the University of Manitoba and her Masters in Business Administration Degree at George Washington University in Washington, D.C. She was also on the Canadian Beach National Team and represented Canada on the FIVB World Beach Volleyball Tour.

== See also ==
- Canada men's national volleyball team
