= Justin Lui =

Canadian volleyball player (born 2000)

Personal information
- Nationality: (Canada) Canadian
- Born: 8 May 2000 (age 26) Markham, Ontario, Canada
- Education: Stanford University
- Height: 1.78 m (5 ft 10 in)
- Weight: 77 kg (170 lb)
- Spike: 318 cm (125 in)
- Block: 303 cm (119 in)

Volleyball information
- Position: Libero

Career
- Years: Team
- 2018–2023 2023–2024 2024–2026: Stanford Cardinal; Vantaa Ducks; VK Dukla Liberec

National team
- Years: Team
- 2018–2019 2021–2026: Canada U21; Canada
Honours
Men's volleyball
Representing Canada
NORCECA Championship
Silver medal – second place	2021 Durango City
Silver medal – second place	2023 Charleston

Justin Lui (born 8 May 2000) is a Canadian retired volleyball player. He was a member of the Canada men's national volleyball team and a participant in 2024 Summer Olympics. Lui announced his retirement in October 2026.

== Career ==
=== Club ===
Lui competed for the Stanford University men's volleyball team while in university, from 2018 to 2023. In 2020, he trained with the Volleyball Canada National Excellence Program in Gatineau.

He signed for Finnish professional volleyball club Vantaa Ducks in 2023, playing with them for the 2023-2024 season. In 2024, he signed for Czech club VK Dukla Liberec.

=== National team ===
Lui has competed for Canada at the FIVB Men's Volleyball Nations League during the 2022, 2023 and 2024 seasons. In July 2024, Lui was named to Canada's 2024 Olympic team.

== Personal life ==
In 2020, Lui came out as gay by writing an email to his university volleyball team. Upon his retirement, he was involved with coaching youth volleyball and studying psychology at Toronto Metropolitan University.
