= Canada men's national volleyball team =

Men's national volleyball team representing Canada

Canada
- Nickname(s): Maple Volley
- Association: Volleyball Canada
- Confederation: NORCECA
- Head coach: Daniel Lewis
- FIVB ranking: 18 (3 August 2026)

Uniforms
Home	Away	Third

Summer Olympics
- Appearances: 6 (First in 1976)
- Best result: 4th (1984)

World Championship
- Appearances: 12 (First in 1974)
- Best result: 7th (2014)

World Cup
- Appearances: 5 (First in 1977)
- Best result: 7th (2003, 2015)

NORCECA Championship
- Appearances: 28 (First in 1969)
- Best result: (2015)
- Volleyball.ca
Honours
World League
Bronze medal – third place	2017 Curitiba
NORCECA Championship
Gold medal – first place	2015 Córdoba
Silver medal – second place	1979 Havana
Silver medal – second place	1983 Indianapolis
Silver medal – second place	1989 San Juan
Silver medal – second place	2003 Culiacán
Silver medal – second place	2013 Langley
Silver medal – second place	2021 Durango City
Silver medal – second place	2023 Charleston
Bronze medal – third place	1973 Tijuana
Bronze medal – third place	1977 Santo Domingo
Bronze medal – third place	1981 Mexico City
Bronze medal – third place	1985 Santiago
Bronze medal – third place	1987 Havana
Bronze medal – third place	1991 Regina
Bronze medal – third place	1993 New Orleans
Bronze medal – third place	1995 Edmonton
Bronze medal – third place	1997 Caguas
Bronze medal – third place	1999 Monterrey
Bronze medal – third place	2001 Bridgetown
Bronze medal – third place	2005 Winnipeg
Bronze medal – third place	2011 Mayaguez
Bronze medal – third place	2017 Colorado Springs
Bronze medal – third place	2019 Winnipeg
Pan American Games
Bronze medal – third place	1979 San Juan	Team
Bronze medal – third place	1999 Winnipeg	Team
Bronze medal – third place	2015 Toronto	Team
Pan-American Cup
Gold medal – first place	2023 Guadalajara
Gold medal – first place	2024 Santo Domingo
Silver medal – second place	2008 Winnipeg
Silver medal – second place	2009 Chiapas
Silver medal – second place	2021 Santo Domingo
Silver medal – second place	2022 Gatineau
Bronze medal – third place	2006 Mexicali
Bronze medal – third place	2011 Gatineau
Bronze medal – third place	2016 Mexico City
Bronze medal – third place	2025 León
Bronze medal – third place	2026 Cuernavaca

The Canada men's national volleyball team represents Canada in international volleyball competitions. They are overseen by Volleyball Canada, the governing body for volleyball in Canada.

The team placed fourth place at the 1984 Olympic Games in Los Angeles and three bronze medals at the Pan American Games in 1979, 1999 and 2015. They have participated in four Olympic Games, including most recently a fifth-place finish at Rio 2016, after returning to the Games following a quarter-century absence. Canada hosted the 2015 Pan American Games in Toronto where they beat Puerto Rico for the bronze medal. Canada competed at the FIVB Volleyball Men's World Cup in 2015 for the first time in 12 years, finishing seventh. They last appeared in 2003, also finishing seventh. They finished joint-seventh at the 2014 FIVB Men's Volleyball World Championship.

== History ==
=== Early years ===
In 1953, the Canadian Volleyball Association (CVA) was formed, joining FIVB the same year. That year, the first national volleyball championship was held as well. Canada's first appearance at a major international competition was at the 1959 Pan American Games, held in Chicago. Canada finished 6th in the tournament, after finishing 3rd in their group and failing to advance to the final group. In 1968, Canada joined NORCECA, two years after it was formed. They competed in their first NORCECA championship in 1969, finishing 4th.

=== 1970s ===
In 1973, at their second NORCECA championship, Canada won the bronze medal. A year later, they competed at their first FIVB World Championships, in Mexico. Canada finished last in their group in the first round, losing all three matches in straight sets. In the classification round, they finished 3rd, finishing below both Tunisia and the United States. In the final classification round, Canada finished 2nd in the group, placing them 20th overall in the tournament.

Canada qualified for their first-ever Olympic tournament in 1976 as hosts. They finished bottom of their group in the group stage, losing in straight sets in every match, and ending up in 9th place overall. The next year, Canada appointed Ken Maeda as the head coach, and in the team's first competition under him, they won bronze at the 1977 NORCECA Championship. In 1978, Canada finished 20th out of 24 teams at the World Championships. At the 1979 Pan American games, Canada won bronze, winning five matches while losing two in the tournament.

=== 1980s ===
At the 1981 NORCECA championship, Canada finished 3rd, beating Mexico in the bronze medal match. The next year, Canada competed in their 3rd FIVB World Championship, held in Argentina. They finished top of their group in the first round, ahead of East Germany and Italy on their set ratio. In the second group round, Canada finished 5th in their group, knocking them out of medal contention and ranking them 11th place in the tournament. The following year at the 1983 NORCECA Championships, they won the silver medal, finishing below the United States.

In 1984, Canada competed at the Olympic Games for the second time in their history. They finished top of their group ahead of Italy and Japan on their set ratio in the group stage, advancing them to their first Olympic semi-final appearance. They met the United States in the semis, losing in straight sets, sending them to the bronze medal match where they lost to Italy again. Their 4th place finish at the tournament stands as their highest ever Olympic finish.

Canada finished 3rd at the NORCECA Championship in 1985 and 1987, and finished 2nd at the 1989 NORCECA Championship while failing to qualify for the 1986 FIVB World Championships.

=== 1990s ===
Canada competed at the 1990 FIVB World Championships in Brazil, finishing 3rd in their group in the group stage. In the round of 16, Canada lost to France in four sets, sending them to the classification bracket, where they lost in five sets to both Czechoslovakia and Japan. Canada finished the tournament in 12th place. The next year, Canada competed in the FIVB World League for the first time. They finished bottom of their group with 18 points over 16 games and finished the tournament in last place. That same year, Canada hosted the NORCECA Championship for the first time, with the tournament taking place in Regina. Canada finished 3rd in the tournament, and qualified for the 1992 Summer Olympics in Barcelona. At the Olympics, they finished 5th in their group, failing to make it to the quarterfinals and finishing the tournament in last place.

In 1993, Canada finished in 3rd place at the NORCECA Championship, beating Puerto Rico in the bronze medal match. At the 1994 FIVB World Championships, Canada lost out in the round of 16 after finishing 3rd in their group, finishing the tournament tied for 9th place. At both the 1995 and 1997 NORCECA Championships, Canada finished with bronze, beating Puerto Rico and Mexico in both respective bronze medal matches. At the 1998 FIVB World Championship, Canada began the tournament finishing 3rd in their group in the first round. In the second group round, Canada finished 5th in their group, failing to make it to the semi-finals. Canada finished the tournament in 12th place, losing to Ukraine and Argentina in the classification matches.

Canada returned to World League in 1999 for the first time since 1992, finishing in 8th place. At the NORCECA Championship, Canada finished with bronze, beating Mexico in the bronze medal match in five sets. Canada also won bronze in the 1999 Pan American Games in Winnipeg, beating Argentina in their final match.

=== 2000s ===
In the 2000 World League season, Canada finished in 11th place. The next year, at the 2001 NORCECA Championship, they finished with bronze, beating Dominicana in their final match. At the 2002 FIVB World Championship, Canada finished 3rd in the first group stage but did not advance to the second group round. They finished 17th overall in the tournament. In 2003, Canada finished with a silver medal at the NORCECA Championship, losing to the United States in the final, and in 2005 they finished with a bronze medal in the same tournament. In 2006, Canada competed in the FIVB World Championship held in Japan. They began the tournament finishing 3rd in their group, advancing past the preliminaries to the main round. There, they placed 6th in their group, knocking them out of medal contention. In the classification matches, Canada lost to the United States in 5 sets but beat Puerto Rico in 4 sets to place 11th overall in the competition. The following year, Canada placed 13th in World League, after finishing bottom of their group with two wins in 12 matches. In the 2007 and 2009 editions of the NORCECA Championship, Canada were held off of the podium for the first time since 1975, finishing in 4th place both years.

=== 2010–2016 ===
At the 2010 FIVB World Championship, Canada finished tied for 19th, losing out in the first group round. The following year Canada competed in World League again, placing 12th overall. The same year, Canada won bronze at the NORCECA Championship, beating Puerto Rico in the deciding match. Canada finished 5th overall in the 2013 World League season, and later that year Canada finished with silver in the NORCECA Championship, losing to the United States in the final.

In 2014, Canada competed in the FIVB World Championship in Poland. Canada opened the tournament with a loss in straight sets to Russia before beating Bulgaria in five sets. Canada then went on to beat the remaining teams in the group all in straight sets to claim the second-ranked spot in the group, advancing to the second round. Canada started the second round off well, beating Cuba in 5 sets before defeating Finland in three straight. However, following two straight-set losses to Brazil and Germany, Canada finished fourth in the group and did not advance to the third round. Canada's finished the world championship in 7th place, a record for the national team.

In 2015, Canada hosted the Pan American Games. At the tournament, Canada finished top of their group, advancing to the semifinals. There they faced Argentina, and lost in four sets, sending Canada to the bronze medal match to face Puerto Rico. They were successful and defeated them in four sets, winning Canada's 3rd Pan-American bronze medal.

In the 2016 World League season, Canada finished top of Group 2, advancing to the Final Round. In the Final Round, they beat Turkey in the semifinals in three sets, and defeated Portugal in the final in three straight. This win qualified Canada for Group 1 in the 2017 World League for the first time. Following the successful World League campaign, Canada competed in the Olympic Qualifiers. Canada began the tournament with two five-set losses to Poland and Iran, before beating Australia in five sets. Canada then went on to beat Venezuela before falling to France in straight sets. They then closed out the tournament with back-to-back wins over Japan and China, in four and five sets respectively. This was good enough for a 4th place finish in the tournament, qualifying Canada for their first Olympics in 24 years.

At the 2016 Summer Olympics, Canada started out strongly, beating USA in three straight sets. However, they failed to defeat the host Brazil, falling to them in four sets, while following that match up with a straight-set loss to France in their 3rd group match. In their 4th match, Canada defeated Mexico in four sets, setting up a must-win final group stage match against Italy. Canada beat Italy in four sets, led by Gavin Schmitt's match-high 23 points. This result placed Canada 2nd in their group and set up a quarterfinal matchup against Russia. However, they were unable to advance past the Russians, losing in three straight sets. Canada finished the tournament in 5th place, their highest Olympic finish since 1984.

=== 2017–present ===
Following Glenn Hoag's retirement as head coach, Stephane Antiga was hired as Hoag's successor. At the 2017 World League, Canada played with a much younger team than was on display at the Olympics the previous year. With the retirements of many leaders within the squad, Antiga looked to younger talent such as Ryley Barnes and Sharone Vernon-Evans to step up and contribute. Canada began their 2017 World League with a strong first week, beating both Belgium and the reigning Olympic Bronze medalists USA in five sets, while losing to Serbia. In week two, Canada won three points against Bulgaria, while losing their other two matches in four sets. In the final week, Canada beat Belgium and Italy, gaining 5 out of a possible 9 points for the week, which was enough for them to finish in 5th place and qualify for the final round.

Canada lost their first match of the final round to the host Brazilians, before defeating the Russians in straight sets, sending Canada to the semi-finals. There they met France and lost in four sets. In the bronze medal match, Canada faced USA, and after losing the first set Canada went on to win three straight and claim their first-ever World League medal. At the conclusion of the tournament, both Graham Vigrass and Blair Bann were selected as tournament all-stars.

== Competition record ==
=== Olympic Games ===
Champions Second place Third place Fourth place

Olympics Games record
Year	Round	Position	GP	MW	ML	SW	SL	Squad
(Japan) 1964	did not qualify							
(Mexico) 1968	did not qualify							
(West Germany) 1972	did not qualify							
(Canada) 1976	Preliminary round	9th	4	0	4	0	12	Squad
(Soviet Union) 1980	did not participate due to US-led boycott							
(United States) 1984	Semifinals	4th	6	3	3	10	9	Squad
(South Korea) 1988	did not qualify							
(Spain) 1992	9th–10th places	10th	6	1	5	11	15	Squad
(United States) 1996	did not qualify							
(Australia) 2000	did not qualify							
(Greece) 2004	did not qualify							
(China) 2008	did not qualify							
(United Kingdom) 2012	did not qualify							
(Brazil) 2016	Quarterfinals	5th	6	3	3	10	10	Squad
(Japan) 2020	Quarterfinals	8th	6	2	4	9	12	Squad
(France) 2024	Preliminary round	10th	3	0	3	3	9	Squad
(United States) 2028	to be determined							
(Australia) 2032	to be determined							
Total	0 Titles	6/16	31	9	22	43	77	—

=== World Championship ===
Champions Second place Third place Fourth place

World Championship record
Year	Round	Position	GP	MW	ML	SW	SL	Squad
(Czechoslovakia) 1949	did not participate							
(Soviet Union) 1952	did not participate							
(France) 1956	did not participate							
(Brazil) 1960	did not participate							
(Soviet Union) 1962	did not participate							
(Czechoslovakia) 1966	did not qualify							
(Bulgaria) 1970	did not qualify							
(Mexico) 1974	19th–24th places	20th	10	5	5	18	20	
(Italy) 1978	17th–20th places	20th	9	3	6	12	18	
(Argentina) 1982	9th–12th places	11th	9	4	5	16	18	
(France) 1986	did not qualify							
(Brazil) 1990	9th–12th places	12th	6	1	5	3	16	Squad
(Greece) 1994	Final Round	9th	4	1	3	5	9	Squad
(Japan) 1998	9th–12th places	12th	12	4	8	15	28	Squad
(Argentina) 2002	First Round	17th	3	1	2	4	7	Squad
(Japan) 2006	9th–12th places	11th	11	5	6	18	24	Squad
(Italy) 2010	First Round	19th	3	1	2	3	7	Squad
(Poland) 2014	Second Round	7th	9	6	3	18	13	Squad
(Italy) (Bulgaria) 2018	Second Round	9th	8	5	3	18	14	Squad
(Poland) (Slovenia) 2022	Preliminary Round	17th	3	1	2	3	6	Squad
(Philippines) 2025	Round of 16	14th	4	2	2	7	7	Squad
(Poland) 2027	Qualified							
(Qatar) 2029	Future events							
Total	0 Titles	13/23	87	37	50	133	180	—

=== World Cup ===
Champions Second place Third place Fourth place

World Cup record
Year	Round	Position	GP	MW	ML	SW	SL	Squad
(Poland) 1965	did not participate							
(East Germany) 1969	did not participate							
(Japan) 1977	Final Group	12th	5	0	5	3	15	
(Japan) 1981	did not participate							
(Japan) 1985	did not participate							
(Japan) 1989	did not participate							
(Japan) 1991	did not participate							
(Japan) 1995	Round Robin	9th	11	3	8	11	27	
(Japan) 1999	Round Robin	8th	11	5	6	17	24	
(Japan) 2003	Round Robin	7th	11	5	6	18	23	Squad
(Japan) 2007	did not participate							
(Japan) 2011	did not participate							
(Japan) 2015	Round Robin	7th	11	5	6	18	22	Squad
(Japan) 2019	Round Robin	9th	11	4	7	19	28	Squad
Total	0 Titles	6/14	60	22	38	86	139	—

=== World League ===
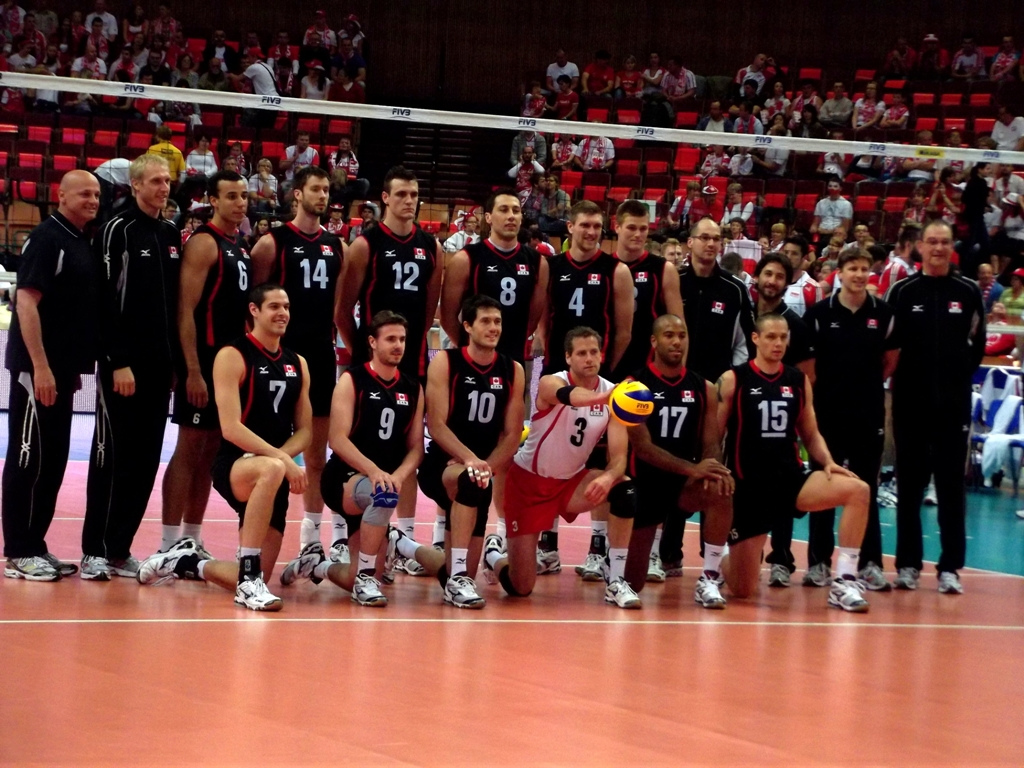
Canadian team at 2012 World League

Champions Second place Third place Fourth place

World League record
Year	Round	Position	GP	MW	ML	SW	SL	Squad
(Japan) 1990	Did not participate							
(Italy) 1991	Intercontinental round	10th	16	2	14	17	45	
(Italy) 1992	Intercontinental round	7th	12	6	6	22	24	
(Brazil) 1993	Did not participate							
(Italy) 1994	Did not participate							
(Brazil) 1995	Did not participate							
(Netherlands) 1996	Did not participate							
(Russia) 1997	Did not participate							
(Italy) 1998	Did not participate							
(Argentina) 1999	Intercontinental round	8th	12	5	7	19	25	
(Netherlands) 2000	Intercontinental round	11th	12	3	9	15	32	
(Poland) 2001	Did not participate							
(Brazil) 2002	Did not participate							
(Spain) 2003	Did not participate							
(Italy) 2004	Did not participate							
(Serbia and Montenegro) 2005	Did not participate							
(Russia) 2006	Did not participate							
(Poland) 2007	Intercontinental round	13th	12	2	10	10	32	Squad
(Brazil) 2008	Did not participate							
(Serbia) 2009	Did not participate							
(Argentina) 2010	Did not participate							
(Poland) 2011	Did not participate							
(Bulgaria) 2012	Intercontinental round	12th	12	3	9	15	30	Squad
(Argentina) 2013	Intercontinental round	5th	12	9	3	29	16	Squad
(Italy) 2014	Intercontinental round	13th	12	6	6	25	23	Squad
(Brazil) 2015	Intercontinental round	15th	12	6	6	29	21	Squad
(Poland) 2016	Group 2 final round	13th	11	10	1	32	7	Squad
(Brazil) 2017	Semifinals	3rd	13	7	6	26	27	Squad
Total	0 Titles	11/28	136	59	77	239	282	—

=== Nations League ===
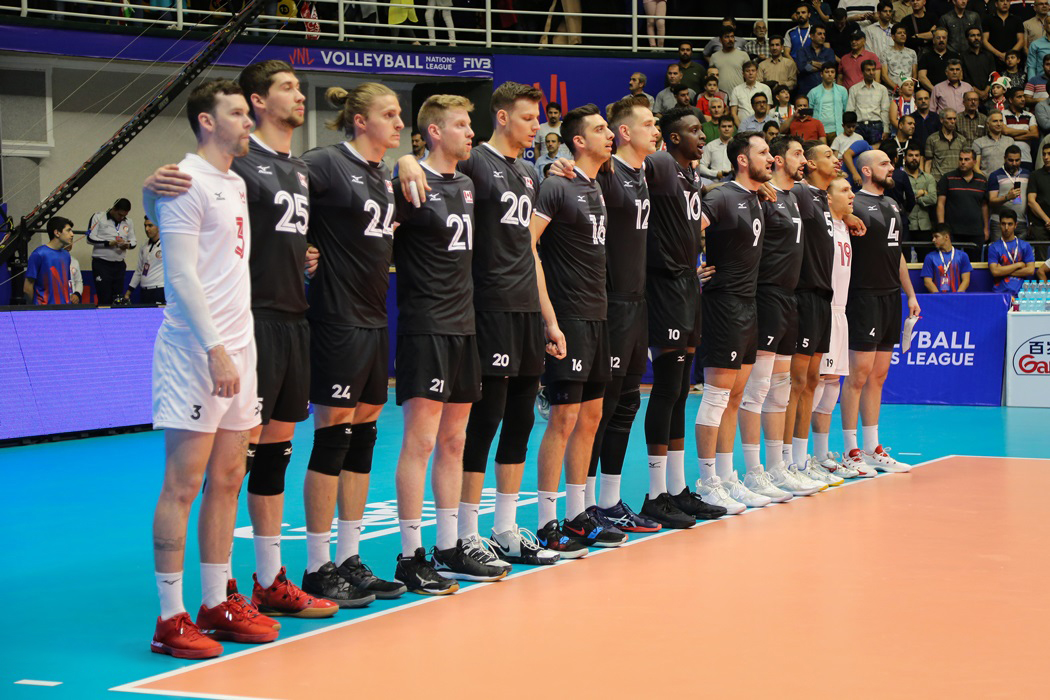
Canadian team at 2019 FIVB Nations League

Nations League record
Year	Round	Position	GP	MW	ML	SW	SL	Squad
(France) 2018	Preliminary round	7th	15	8	7	29	24	Squad
(United States) 2019	Preliminary round	9th	15	8	7	29	29	Squad
(Italy) 2021	Preliminary round	8th	15	7	8	27	26	Squad
(Italy) 2022	Preliminary round	15th	12	2	10	10	33	Squad
(Poland) 2023	Preliminary round	12th	12	3	9	15	31	Squad
(Poland) 2024	Quarterfinals	6th	13	8	5	29	22	Squad
(China) 2025	Preliminary round	14th	12	5	7	23	24	Squad
(China) 2026	Preliminary round	18th	12	1	11	19	34	Squad
(N/A) 2027	Did not qualify							
Total	0 Titles	8/9	106	42	64	181	223	—

=== NORCECA Championship ===
Champions Second place Third place Fourth place

NORCECA Championship record
Year	Round	Position	GP	MW	ML	SW	SL	Squad
(Guatemala) 1969	Semifinals	4th	5	3	2	9	9	
(Cuba) 1971	Did not participate							
(Mexico) 1973	Semifinals	3rd	5	3	2	9	9	
(United States) 1975	Semifinals	4th	4	1	3	3	10	
(Dominican Republic) 1977	Semifinals	3rd	6	5	1	16	6	
(Cuba) 1979	Round robin	2nd	6	4	2	14	8	
(Mexico) 1981	Semifinals	3rd	6	4	2	14	7	
(United States) 1983	Final	2nd	5	4	1	12	5	
(Dominican Republic) 1985	Semifinals	3rd	7	5	2			
(Cuba) 1987	Semifinals	3rd	7	5	2	16	6	
(Puerto Rico) 1989	Final	2nd	7	6	1	18	5	
(Canada) 1991	Round robin	3rd	8					
(United States) 1993	Semifinals	3rd	3	2	1	6	3	
(Canada) 1995	Semifinals	3rd	5	3	2	12	6	
(Puerto Rico) 1997	Semifinals	3rd	5	4	1	13	5	
(Mexico) 1999	Semifinals	3rd	5	4	1	14	7	
(Barbados) 2001	Semifinals	3rd	6	3	3	13	10	Squad
(Mexico) 2003	Final	2nd	4	3	1	10	6	Squad
(Canada) 2005	Semifinals	3rd	6	3	3	11	9	Squad
(United States) 2007	Semifinals	4th	6	3	3	11	9	Squad
(Puerto Rico) 2009	Semifinals	4th	6	3	3	12	12	Squad
(Puerto Rico) 2011	Semifinals	3rd	5	4	1	14	4	Squad
(Canada) 2013	Final	2nd	4	3	1	9	3	Squad
(Mexico) 2015	Final	1st	4	4	0	12	3	Squad
(United States) 2017	Semifinals	3rd	4	3	1	9	4	Squad
(Canada) 2019	Semifinals	3rd	5	4	1	13	3	Squad
(Mexico) 2021	Final	2nd	7	4	3	9	11	Squad
(United States) 2023	Final	2nd	5	4	1	9	5	Squad
(Canada) 2026	Final	2nd	5	4	1	14	3	Squad
Total	1 Title	28/29	151	97	46	299	169	—

=== Pan American Games ===
- 1955 Mexico City — did not participate
- (United States) 1959 Chicago — 6th place
- (Brazil) 1963 São Paulo — 8th place
- (Canada) 1967 Winnipeg — 6th place
- (Colombia) 1971 Cali — 9th place
- 1975 Mexico City — 6th place
- (Puerto Rico) 1979 San Juan — Bronze medal
- (Venezuela) 1983 Caracas — 5th place
- (United States) 1987 Indianapolis — 5th place
- (Cuba) 1991 Havana — 6th place
- (Argentina) 1995 Mar del Plata — 5th place
- (Canada) 1999 Winnipeg — Bronze medal
- (Dominican Republic) 2003 Santo Domingo — 5th place
- (Brazil) 2007 Rio de Janeiro — 7th place
  Bernier, Carroll, Cundy, Duerden, Grapentine, Daniel Lewis, Munday, Soonias, Wilcox, Winters, Wolfenden, Youngberg. Head Coach: Hoag
- (Mexico) 2011 Guadalajara — 6th place
  Bann, Burt, Halpenny, Kilpatrick, Leiske, Mainville, Miller, Nault, Parkinson, Ratsep, Santoni. Head Coach: Vincent Pichette
- (Canada) 2015 Toronto — Bronze medal
  Hoag, Lewis, Marshall, Perrin, Sanders, Schmitt, Schneider, Simac, Van Lankvelt, Verhoeff, Vigrass, Winters. Head Coach: Hoag

=== Pan-American Cup ===
- (Mexico) 2006 Mexicali & Tijuana — Bronze medal
- (Dominican Republic) 2007 Santo Domingo — 4th place
- (Canada) 2008 Winnipeg — Silver medal
- (Mexico) 2009 Chiapas — Silver medal
- (Puerto Rico) 2010 San Juan — 5th place
- (Canada) 2011 Gatineau — Bronze medal
- (Dominican Republic) 2012 Santo Domingo — 6th place
- 2013 Mexico City — did not participate
- (Mexico) 2014 Tijuana — 7th place
- (United States) 2015 Reno — 4th place
- 2016 Mexico City — Bronze medal
- (Canada) 2017 Gatineau — 4th place
- (Mexico) 2018 Córdoba — 6th place
- (Mexico) 2019 Colima City — 7th place
- (Dominican Republic) 2021 Santo Domingo — Silver medal
- (Canada) 2022 Gatineau — Silver medal
- (Mexico) 2023 Guadalajara — Gold medal
- (Dominican Republic) 2024 Santo Domingo — Gold medal
- (Mexico) 2025 León — Bronze medal
- (Mexico) 2026 Cuernavaca — Bronze medal

=== America's Cup ===
- (Argentina) 1998 Mar del Plata — 6th place
- (United States) 1999 Tampa — 5th place
- (Brazil) 2000 São Bernardo — 5th place
- (Argentina) 2001 Buenos Aires — 6th place
- (Brazil) 2005 São Leopoldo — 5th place
- (Brazil) 2007 Manaus — 5th place
- (Brazil) 2008 Cuiabá — did not participate

== Team ==
=== Current roster ===
The following is Canada's roster for the 2025 FIVB Men's Volleyball World Championship.

Head coach: (Canada) Daniel Lewis

- 1 Daenan Gyimah MB
- 2 Luke Herr S
- 3 Jesse Elser OH
- 4 Nicholas Hoag OH
- 7 Jackson Howe MB
- 9 Max Elgert S
- 11 Xander Ketrzynski OP
- 13 Sharone Vernon-Evans OP
- 15 Jackson Young OH
- 16 Jordan Schnitzer MB
- 18 Justin Lui L
- 22 Isaac Heslinga OH
- 33 Fynn McCarthy MB
- 97 Landon Currie L

=== Coaching staff ===
Name	Position
(Canada) Daniel Lewis	Head coach
(Brazil) João Paulo Bravo	Assistant coach
(Canada) Jason Haldane	Assistant coach
(Canada) Schad Richea	Athletic Therapist
(Canada) Michael Cook	Strength Coach
(Canada) Kyle Paquette	Mental Performance Coach
(Canada) Julien Boucher	General manager

=== Coach history ===
Name	From	To
(United States) Bill Neville	1972	1977
(Japan) Ken Maeda	1977	1984
(Canada) Paul Brasson	1984	1985
(Canada) Brian Watson	1985	1992
(Canada) Clement Lemieux	1992	1996
(Canada) Garth Pischke	1996	2000
(Canada) Stelio DeRocco	2001	2006
(Canada) Glenn Hoag	2006	2016
(France) Stephane Antiga	2017	2018
(Canada) Glenn Hoag	2018	2021
(Canada) Ben Josephson	2021	2022
(Finland) Tuomas Sammelvuo	2022	2024
(Canada) Daniel Lewis	2025	

== Kit provider ==
The table below shows the history of kit providers for the Canada national volleyball team.

Period	Kit provider
2000–	Mizuno

=== Sponsorship ===
Primary sponsors include: main sponsors like Inter Pipeline other sponsors: Lululemon Athletica, Wilson Sporting Goods and UNIGLOBE Travel International.

== See also ==
- Canada men's junior national volleyball team
- Canada women's national volleyball team
