= Jorge Sánchez Salgado =

Cuban volleyball player (born 1985)

Personal information
- Born: March 23, 1985 (age 41)
Medal record
Men's volleyball
Representing Cuba
Pan American Games
Bronze medal – third place	2007 Rio de Janeiro	Team
America's Cup
Bronze medal – third place	2007 Manaus	Team
NORCECA Championship
Bronze medal – third place	2007 Anaheim	Team

Jorge Luis Sánchez Salgado (born March 23, 1985) is a male volleyball player from Cuba, who played as a libero for the Men's National Team. He was a member of the national squad that claimed the bronze medal at the 2007 Pan American Games in Rio de Janeiro, Brazil.
