= César Canario =

Argentine footballer (born 1987)

Personal information
- Full name: César Alexis Canario
- Date of birth: 18 August 1987 (age 39)
- Place of birth: Santa Fe, Argentina
- Height: 1.84 m (6 ft 0 in)
- Position: Forward

Youth career
- Colón de Santa Fe

Senior career*
Years	Team	Apps	(Gls)
2004–2011	Colón de Santa Fe		
2009	→ 2 de Mayo (loan)	14	(4)
2009–2010	→ Sportivo Italiano (loan)	11	(1)
2011	Leotar	3	(0)
2011	Huracán de Tres Arroyos	4	(1)
2012	Espoli	9	(1)
2012	Deportivo Laferrere	10	(1)
2013	Huracan de Comodoro Rivadavia	11	(7)
2013	Boca Rio Gallegos	8	(3)
2014	Racing de Olavarría	8	(3)
- * Club domestic league appearances and goals

César Alexis Canario (born 18 August 1987) is an Argentinian footballer.

Born in Santa Fe, Argentina, he started playing with the local club Club Atlético Colón in 2004. Colón sent him on loan to Paraguayan Primera División side Club 2 de Mayo in 2009. Next, he moved to Sportivo Italiano, a club which had just been promoted to the Primera B Nacional league. After returning to CA Colon and playing with their reserves team, in January 2011 he signed with Bosnian Premier League side FK Leotar. In summer 2011 he left Leotar and returned to Argentina, to play with Huracán de Tres Arroyos., and, after 6 months, he will move abroad again, this time to Ecuador to join Espoli.

== External sources ==
- alexiscanario.blogspot.pt
- César Canario at BDFA (in Spanish)
