= Xander Ketrzynski =

Canadian volleyball player (born 2000)

Personal information
- Nationality: (Canada) Canadian
- Born: January 27, 2000 (age 26) Toronto, Ontario, Canada
- Education: Toronto Metropolitan University
- Height: 2.07 m (6 ft 9 in)
- Weight: 100 kg (220 lb)
- Spike: 370 cm (146 in)
- Block: 335 cm (132 in)

Volleyball information
- Position: Opposite
- Current club: Incheon Korean Air Jumbos

Career
- Years: Team
- 2018–2020 2020–2021 2021 2021–2022 2022–2025 2025–2026 2026–: Ryerson Rams; Al Sadd; Ribnica Kraljevo; SK Aich/Dob; SVG Lüneburg; AS Cannes; Incheon Korean Air Jumbos

National team
- Years: Team
- 2018–2019 2021–: Canada U21; Canada
Honours
Men's volleyball
Representing Canada
NORCECA Championship
Silver medal – second place	2021 Durango City

Xander Ketrzynski (born January 27, 2000) is a Canadian volleyball player. He is a member of the Canada men's national volleyball team and a participant in 2024 Summer Olympics.

== Career ==
In 2020, Ketrzynski signed a contract to play in Qatar. Ketrzynski competed for the Canadian team as part of the 2024 FIVB Men's Volleyball Nations League. In July 2024, Ketrzynski was named to Canada's 2024 Olympic team.

== Personal life ==
Xander Ketryznski along with his two brothers attended York Mills Collegiate Institute in Toronto, Canada.

For post secondary education, Ketrzynski attended Toronto Metropolitan University.
