= 2005 Men's NORCECA Volleyball Championship squads =

This article shows all participating team squads at the 2005 Men's NORCECA Volleyball Championship, held from September 8 to September 16, 2005 in the MTS Centre in Winnipeg, Manitoba, (Canada).

== Dominican Republic ==
- Head Coach: Julio Frías

#	Name	Date of Birth	Weight	Height	Spike	Block
1	Carlos Manuel Velásquez	08.12.1985	68	170
2	Felipe Henriquez Díaz	16.09.1977	77	183	330	310
3	Elvis Contreras	16.05.1984	75	185	345	320
4	Cristian Cruz (c)	30.08.1974	100	180	270	280
6	Elvis Pascual	25.11.1984	72	190	335	325
9	Amaury Martínez	13.02.1973	90	192	325	320
10	Francisco Abreu	26.04.1982	92	183	331	315
11	José Miguel Cáceres	24.12.1981	96	210	361	340
13	Juan Eury Almonte	19.08.1978	96	196	350	330
16	Víctor Batista	02.10.1979	90	199	350	340
	Miguel Merán
	Nelvin Polanco

== United States ==
- Head coach: Hugh McCutcheon

#	Name	Date of Birth	Height	Weight	Spike	Block
2	Pieter Olree
3	James Polster	08.02.1979	198	100	352	333
4	Chris Tamas
5	Richard Lambourne	06.05.1975	190	90	324	312
6	Phillip Eatherton	02.01.1974	206	101	356	335
7	Donald Suxho
9	Ryan Millar
10	Riley Salmon	02.07.1976	197	89	345	331
11	Brook Billings
12	Thomas Hoff	09.06.1973	198	94	353	333
13	Clayton Stanley
16	David McKienzie	05.07.1979	193	95	358	340
