= Daniel Delgado =

Panamanian politician (died 2021)

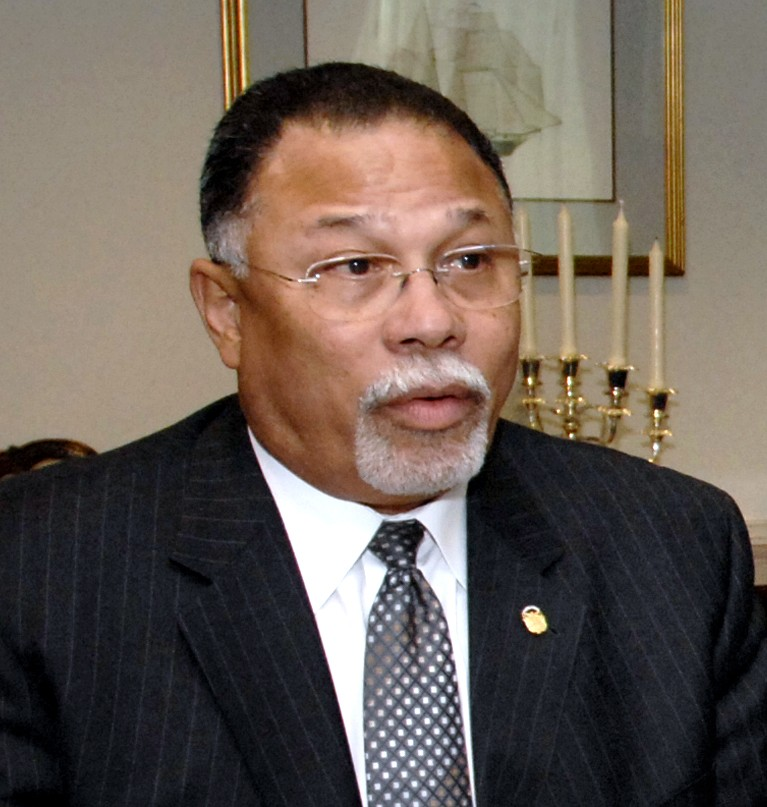
Delgado at the Pentagon in 2008

Daniel Delgado Diamante (1947/1948 – 30 July 2021) was a Panamanian politician, who served as Minister of Justice from 31 August 2007 until October 2008, after he was promoted from Chief of Customs.

He was previously a lieutenant colonel in the Panama Defense Forces and part of the military dictatorship of Manuel Noriega, but was decommissioned when the PDF was dissolved following the United States invasion in 1989.

In July 2008, Delgado announced the government would deny a U.S. military base in Panama, citing the nations' prior history.

He was accused in October 2008 of killing Corporal Andrés García on 8 February 1970, for refusing to follow an order given by Delgado.

The Second Superior Court of Justice filed the file after declaring the criminal action in the proceeding to Delgado for García's death, which occurred on 8 February 1970, in the community of Panamá Viejo, in the capital, informed the judicial organ. In the ruling dated 8 July 2015, it is established that the criminal action in this case in effect prescribed on 20 December 2001, twelve years after the end of the military regime (1968-1989).

Delgado died on 30 July 2021 at the age of 73.
