= Christian Bernier =

Canadian volleyball player (born 1981)

Christian Bernier (born November 20, 1981, in Sudbury, Ontario) is a male volleyball player from Canada, who competed for the Men's National Team. He was a member of the national squad who ended up in seventh place at the 2007 Pan American Games in Rio de Janeiro, Brazil.
