= Alexandre Gaumont Casias =

Canadian volleyball player (born 1984)

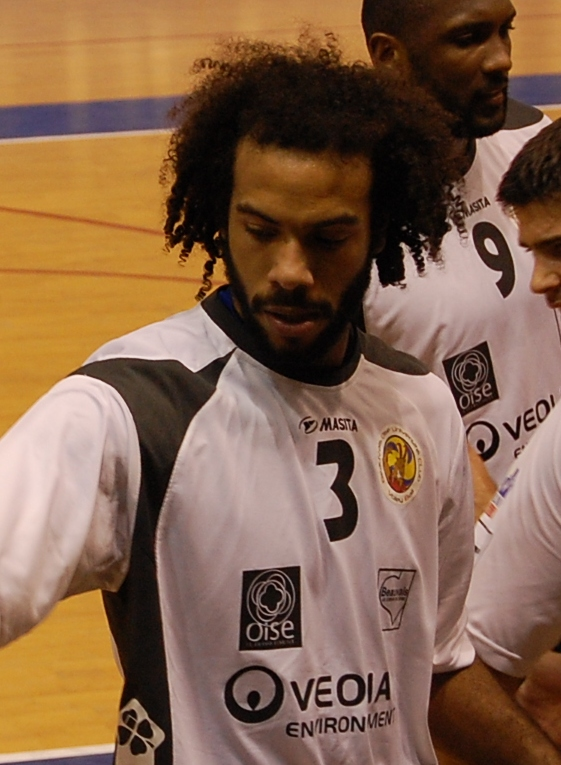
- Alexandre Gaumont Casias

Personal information
- Full name: Alexandre Gaumont Casias
- Born: November 26, 1984 (age 41); Marieville, Quebec, Canada
- Height: 1.95 m (6 ft 5 in)
- Weight: 95 kg (209 lb)
- Spike: 360 cm (140 in)
- Block: 325 cm (128 in)
- Education: Cégep de Sherbrooke; University of Alberta

Volleyball information
- Position: Outside hitter

Career
Years	Teams
2003–2004; 2004–2006; 2007–2008; 2008–2009; 2009–2010; 2010–2011; 2011–2012	Cégep de Sherbrooke; Alberta Golden Bears; P.A.O.K. Rennes Volley 35; Tours VB; Beauvais Oise UC; Tourcoing Lille VB

National team
2004–2012	Canada
- Last updated: 19 July 2017

Alexandre Gaumont Casias (born 26 November 1984) is a former Canadian male volleyball player. He was a member of the Canada men's national volleyball team, and spent most of his career in the French Pro A.
