= Jeremy Wilcox =

Canadian volleyball player (born 1979)

Jeremy Wilcox (born February 22, 1979, in Calgary) is a male volleyball player from Canada, who competed for the Men's National Team as a setter. He was a member of the national squad that finished in seventh place at the 2007 Pan American Games in Rio de Janeiro.
