= Dallas Soonias =

Canadian volleyball player (born 1984)

Personal information
- Full name: Dallas Randolph Soonias
- Born: April 25, 1984 (age 42); Saskatoon, Saskatchewan, Canada
- Height: 2.00 m (6 ft 7 in)
- Weight: 91 kg (201 lb)
- Spike: 356 cm (140 in)
- Block: 323 cm (127 in)
- Education: Red Deer College; University of Alberta

Volleyball information
- Position: Opposite

Career
Years	Teams
2004–2005; 2006–2007; 2007–2008; 2008; 2008–2009; 2009–2011; 2011–2012; 2012–2013; 2013–2014; 2014–2015; 2015–2016	Alberta Pandas; Jadar Radom; Arago de Sète; Yaroslavich Yaroslavl; Montpellier Volley; CV Almería; Hyundai Capital; Plataneros de Corozal; Fujian Volleyball; Al Arabi; Pallavolo Impavida Ortona

National team
2004–2016	Canada
Honours
Men's volleyball
Representing Canada
NORCECA Championship
Silver medal – second place	2013 Langley
Bronze medal – third place	2011 Mayaguez
Pan American Games
Bronze medal – third place	2015 Toronto
- Last updated: 2024-08-01

Dallas Soonias (born April 25, 1984) is a male volleyball player from Canada, who competed for the Men's National Team as a right side hitter. He was a member of the national squad who won bronze at the 2015 Pan American Games in Toronto, Ontario, Canada. He received the Indspire Award in the sports category in 2021.

== Personal life ==
Soonias is considered both Cree and Ojibwe. Along with his mother, he is registered at the Cape Croker First Nations reserve, whereas his father is Red Pheasant First Nation.

Dallas is married to volleyball player, Jaimie Thibeault.

They are both role models for Neechie Gear, a clothing brand which gives a 5% profit to give children the opportunity to participate in sports. The title of the company refers to a Cree greeting, which is warm and friendly.

Through Indigenous communities, he connects to youth to relate to them in a positive light, both through the court and through story telling. Volleyball on the Move Clinic is an example of this, where he worked through the program in various elementary schools in Whitehorse, Yukon in partnership with Volleyball Yukon.

Dallas has had experience assisted coaching at the University of Alberta for the men's volleyball team. He was awarded the Indspire Award in the sports category in 2021.

He appeared in the 2024 edition of Canada Reads, advocating for Jessica Johns's novel Bad Cree.
