= Stelio DeRocco =

Canadian volleyball player (born 1960)

Personal information
- Nickname: The Rock, Italian Stallion, CoCo
- Nationality: Canadian
- Born: 13 April 1960 (age 66); Mali Losiny, Croatia
- Hometown: Winnipeg, Manitoba, Canada
- Height: 6 ft 7 in (201 cm)

Volleyball information
- Position: Left Side Power

Stelio DeRocco (born 13 April 1960) is a former Canadian volleyball player and coach. He was the coach of the Australia men's national volleyball team at the 2000 Summer Olympics in Sydney, Australia, where the team finished 8th. In 2004, he signed a contract with the Canadian national team until 2006.

De Rocco was a member of the Canadian national team in 1977-80 and 1985–86.

== See also ==
- Australia at the 2000 Summer Olympics
- PlusLiga
