= Pedro Iznaga =

Cuban volleyball player (born 1986)

Personal information
- Born: August 11, 1986 (age 39)
Medal record
Men's volleyball
Representing Cuba
Pan American Games
Bronze medal – third place	2007 Rio de Janeiro	Team
America's Cup
Bronze medal – third place	2007 Manaus	Team
NORCECA Championship
Bronze medal – third place	2007 Anaheim	Team

Pedro Iznaga Ortíz (born August 11, 1986) is a male indoor volleyball player from Cuba, who played for the Men's National Team. He was a member of the national squad that claimed the bronze medal at the 2007 Pan American Games in Rio de Janeiro, Brazil.
