= Ignacio Ramírez (volleyball) =

Mexican volleyball player (born 1976)

Personal information
- Nationality: Mexican
- Born: 17 September 1976 (age 50)
- Height: 183 cm (6 ft 0 in)
- Weight: 85 kg (187 lb)
- Spike: 325 cm (128 in)
- Block: 314 cm (124 in)

Volleyball information
- Number: 9 (national team)

Career
Years	Teams
2001; 2014	Nayarit; Cocoteros

National team
2001-2014	Mexico

Ignacio Ramírez (born 17 September 1976) is a former Mexican male volleyball player. He was part of the Mexico men's national volleyball team. On club level he played for Nayarit and Cocoteros.
