= Darien Ferrer =

Cuban volleyball player (born 1982)

Personal information
- Full name: Darien Ferrer Delis
- Born: 31 October 1982 (age 43); Santiago de Cuba, Cuba
- Height: 204 cm (6 ft 8 in)
- Weight: 84 kg (185 lb)
- Spike: 362 cm (143 in)
- Block: 346 cm (136 in)

Career
Years	Teams
2009	Santiago de Cuba

National team
2009	Cuba
Medal record
Men's volleyball
Representing Cuba
Pan-American Cup
Bronze medal – third place	2007 Santo Domingo	Team
America's Cup
Bronze medal – third place	2007 Manaus	Team

Darien Ferrer Delis (Note: In this Spanish name, the first or paternal surname is Ferrer and the second or maternal family name is Delis.) (also spelled Darienn, born 31 October 1982) is a volleyball player from Cuba, who plays as a middle-blocker for the men's national team. He ended up in second place at the first 2008 Olympic Qualification Tournament in Düsseldorf, where Cuba missed qualification for the 2008 Summer Olympics in Beijing, PR China. On club level he played for Santiago de Cuba.

== Honours ==
- 2007 America's Cup — 3rd place
- 2008 Olympic Qualification Tournament — 2nd place (did not qualify)
