= Christopher Wolfenden =

Canadian volleyball player (born 1977)

Chris Wolfenden

Personal information
- Full name: Christopher Wolfenden
- Born: 22 June 1977 (age 49); London, Ontario
- Hometown: Peterborough, Ontario
- Height: 195 cm (6 ft 5 in)
- Weight: 89 kg (196 lb)
- Spike: 343 cm (135 in)
- Block: 322 cm (127 in)
- Education: Dalhousie

Volleyball information
- Number: 12

Career
Years	Teams
2001-2008	Landstede Zwolle, Netherlands; Tiroler Wasserkraft, Austria; Maoam Mendig, Germany; Bayer Wuppertal, Germany; Alexandroupolis, Greece; PAOK, Greece

National team
2001-2008	Canada

Christopher Wolfenden (born 22 June 1977) is a Canadian retired volleyball player. He was part of the Canada men's national volleyball team at the 2002 and 2006 FIVB Volleyball Men's World Championships, 2003 World Cup, 2005 Americas Cup, 2007 World League, 2003 and 2007 Pan American Games.

== Clubs ==
- Landstede Zwolle, Netherlands (2002)
- Tiroler Wasserkraft, Innsbruck, Austria (2003)
- Tiroler Wasserkraft, Innsbruck, Austria (2004)
- Maoam Mendig, Germany (2005)
- Bayer Wuppertal, Germany (2006)
- Alexandroupolis, Greece (2007)
- PAOK, Thessaloniki, Greece (2008)
