= Odelvis Dominico =

Cuban volleyball player (born 1977)

Personal information
- Full name: Odelvis Dominico Speek
- Born: May 6, 1977 (age 49)
Honours
Men's volleyball
Representing Cuba
Pan American Games
Silver medal – second place	2003 San Domingo	Team
Bronze medal – third place	2007 Rio de Janeiro	Team

Odelvis Dominico Speek (born May 6, 1977) is a male volleyball player from Cuba, who plays as a middle-blocker for the Men's National Team. He became Best Blocker at the first 2008 Olympic Qualification Tournament in Düsseldorf, where Cuba ended up in second place and missed qualification for the 2008 Summer Olympics in Beijing, PR China.

== Honours ==
- 2003 Pan American Games — 2nd place
- 2005 America's Cup — 3rd place
- 2007 NORCECA Championship — 3rd place
- 2007 America's Cup — 3rd place
- 2008 Olympic Qualification Tournament — 2nd place (did not qualify)
