= 1999 Men's NORCECA Volleyball Championship =

1999 Men's NORCECA Championship
Tournament details
- Host country: Mexico
- Dates: 7–12 September
- Teams: 8
- Venue: 1 (in 1 host city)

Final positions
- Champions: United States (4th title)

The 1999 Men's NORCECA Volleyball Championship was the 16th edition of the tournament, played from 7 to 12 September in Monterrey, Mexico. The top 2 teams qualified for the 1999 FIVB World Cup.

== Competing nations ==
The following national teams have qualified:

Pool A	Pool B
Canada	Cuba
Mexico	United States
Puerto Rico	Barbados
Guatemala	Jamaica

== Pool standing procedure ==
1. Number of matches won
2. Match points
3. Points ratio
4. Sets ratio
5. Result of the last match between the tied teams

Match won 3–0: 5 match points for the winner, 0 match points for the loser
Match won 3–1: 4 match points for the winner, 1 match point for the loser
Match won 3–2: 3 match points for the winner, 2 match points for the loser

== Preliminary round ==
=== Pool A ===
Pos	Team	Pld	W	L	Pts	SPW	SPL	SPR	SW	SL	SR	Qualification
1	Canada	3	3	0	13	260	215	1.209	9	2	4.500	Semifinals
2	Mexico	3	2	1	12	249	218	1.142	8	3	2.667	Quarterfinals
3	Puerto Rico	3	1	2	5	209	209	1.000	3	6	0.500	Quarterfinals
4	Guatemala	3	0	3	0	149	229	0.651	0	9	0.000	7th–8th classification

Date	Time		Score		Set 1	Set 2	Set 3	Set 4	Set 5	Total	Report
7 Sep	17:00	Canada	3–0	Puerto Rico	25–21	25–22	29–27			79–70	
7 Sep	19:00	Mexico	3–0	Guatemala	25–14	25–21	25–13			75–48	
8 Sep	15:00	Puerto Rico	3–0	Guatemala	25–15	25–18	25–22			75–55	
8 Sep	19:00	Canada	3–2	Mexico	20–25	25–20	25–22	21–25	15–7	106–99	
9 Sep	17:00	Canada	3–0	Guatemala	25–13	25–21	25–12			75–46	
9 Sep	19:00	Mexico	3–0	Puerto Rico	25–22	25–21	25–21			75–64	

=== Pool B ===
Pos	Team	Pld	W	L	Pts	SPW	SPL	SPR	SW	SL	SR	Qualification
1	Cuba	3	3	0	14	248	142	1.746	9	1	9.000	Semifinals
2	United States	3	2	1	11	227	167	1.359	7	3	2.333	Quarterfinals
3	Barbados	3	1	2	5	142	213	0.667	3	6	0.500	Quarterfinals
4	Jamaica	3	0	3	0	130	225	0.578	0	9	0.000	7th–8th classification

Date	Time		Score		Set 1	Set 2	Set 3	Set 4	Set 5	Total	Report
7 Sep	11:00	United States	3–0	Barbados	25–7	25–15	25–15			75–37	
7 Sep	15:00	Cuba	3–0	Jamaica	25–12	25–13	25–10			75–35	
8 Sep	11:00	Barbados	3–0	Jamaica	25–22	25–22	25–19			75–63	
8 Sep	17:00	Cuba	3–1	United States	25–10	23–25	25–23	25–19		98–77	
9 Sep	11:00	United States	3–0	Jamaica	25–9	25–10	25–13			75–32	
9 Sep	15:00	Cuba	3–0	Barbados	25–16	25–10	25–14			75–40	

== Final round ==
Quarterfinals
10 September
United States	3
Puerto Rico	1
10 September
Mexico	3
Barbados	0

Semifinals
11 September
Canada	2
United States	3
11 September
Cuba	3
Mexico	0

Final
12 September
United States	3
Cuba	1
3rd place
12 September
Canada	3
Mexico	2

=== 7th place match ===
Date	Time		Score		Set 1	Set 2	Set 3	Set 4	Set 5	Total	Report
10 Sep	15:00	Guatemala	3–0	Jamaica	25–11	25–11	25–20			75–42	

=== Quarterfinals ===
Date	Time		Score		Set 1	Set 2	Set 3	Set 4	Set 5	Total	Report
10 Sep	17:00	United States	3–1	Puerto Rico	25–22	28–30	25–19	25–20		103–91	
10 Sep	19:00	Mexico	3–0	Barbados	25–17	25–17	25–22			75–56	

=== 5th place match ===
Date	Time		Score		Set 1	Set 2	Set 3	Set 4	Set 5	Total	Report
11 Sep	15:00	Puerto Rico	3–0	Barbados							

=== Semifinals ===
Date	Time		Score		Set 1	Set 2	Set 3	Set 4	Set 5	Total	Report
11 Sep	17:00	United States	3–1	Canada	25–23	25–27	25–21	25–23		100–94	
11 Sep	19:00	Cuba	3–0	Mexico	25–21	25–22	29–27			79–70	

=== Bronze medal match ===
Date	Time		Score		Set 1	Set 2	Set 3	Set 4	Set 5	Total	Report
12 Sep	13:00	Canada	3–2	Mexico	25–18	24–26	25–20	23–25	15–9	112–98	

=== Final ===
Date	Time		Score		Set 1	Set 2	Set 3	Set 4	Set 5	Total	Report
12 Sep	15:00	United States	3–1	Cuba	25–16	25–22	23–25	25–19		98–82	

== Final standing ==
Rank	Team
1st place, gold medalist(s)	United States
2nd place, silver medalist(s)	Cuba
3rd place, bronze medalist(s)	Canada
4	Mexico
5	Puerto Rico
6	Barbados
7	Guatemala
8	Jamaica

Qualified for the 1999 FIVB World Cup

1999 Men's NORCECA champions

United States
4th title
