= 1997 Men's NORCECA Volleyball Championship =

1997 Men's NORCECA Championship
Tournament details
- Host country: Puerto Rico
- Dates: 12–18 September
- Teams: 8
- Venue: 1 (in 1 host city)

Final positions
- Champions: Cuba (12th title)

The 1997 Men's NORCECA Volleyball Championship was the 15th edition of the tournament, played from 12 to 18 September in San Juan, Puerto Rico. The top team qualified for the 1999 World Grand Champions Cup.

== Competing nations ==
The following national teams have qualified:

| Pool A | Pool B |
|---|---|
| Cuba | Canada |
| United States | Mexico |
| Barbados | Puerto Rico |
| Dominican Republic | Guatemala |

== Pool standing procedure ==
1. Number of matches won
2. Match points
3. Points ratio
4. Sets ratio
5. Result of the last match between the tied teams

Match won 3–0: 5 match points for the winner, 0 match points for the loser
Match won 3–1: 4 match points for the winner, 1 match point for the loser
Match won 3–2: 3 match points for the winner, 2 match points for the loser

== Preliminary round ==
=== Pool A ===
| Pos | Team | Pld | W | L | Pts | SPW | SPL | SPR | SW | SL | SR | Qualification |
|---|---|---|---|---|---|---|---|---|---|---|---|---|
| 1 | Cuba | 3 | 3 | 0 | 15 | 135 | 38 | 3.553 | 9 | 0 | MAX | Semifinals |
| 2 | United States | 3 | 2 | 1 | 10 | 117 | 68 | 1.721 | 6 | 3 | 2.000 | Quarterfinals |
| 3 | Barbados | 3 | 1 | 2 | 5 | 55 | 90 | 0.611 | 3 | 6 | 0.500 | Quarterfinals |
| 4 | Dominican Republic | 3 | 0 | 3 | 0 | 24 | 135 | 0.178 | 0 | 9 | 0.000 | 7th–8th classification |

| Date | Time | | Score | | Set 1 | Set 2 | Set 3 | Set 4 | Set 5 | Total | Report |
|---|---|---|---|---|---|---|---|---|---|---|---|
| 12 Sep | | Cuba | 3–0 | Dominican Republic | 15–2 | 15–5 | 15–1 | | | 45–8 | |
| 12 Sep | | United States | 3–0 | Barbados | 15–1 | 15–5 | 15–1 | | | 45–7 | |
| 13 Sep | | Cuba | 3–0 | Barbados | 15–3 | 15–0 | 15–0 | | | 45–3 | |
| 13 Sep | | United States | 3–0 | Dominican Republic | 15–6 | 15–6 | 15–4 | | | 45–16 | |
| 14 Sep | | Barbados | 3–0 | Dominican Republic | | | | | | | |
| 14 Sep | | Cuba | 3–0 | United States | 15–6 | 15–10 | 15–11 | | | 45–27 | |

=== Pool B ===
| Pos | Team | Pld | W | L | Pts | SPW | SPL | SPR | SW | SL | SR | Qualification |
|---|---|---|---|---|---|---|---|---|---|---|---|---|
| 1 | Canada | 3 | 3 | 0 | 14 | 141 | 74 | 1.905 | 9 | 1 | 9.000 | Semifinals |
| 2 | Mexico | 3 | 2 | 1 | 10 | 108 | 63 | 1.714 | 6 | 3 | 2.000 | Quarterfinals |
| 3 | Puerto Rico | 3 | 1 | 2 | 6 | 91 | 113 | 0.805 | 4 | 6 | 0.667 | Quarterfinals |
| 4 | Guatemala | 3 | 0 | 3 | 0 | 42 | 135 | 0.311 | 0 | 9 | 0.000 | 7th–8th classification |

| Date | Time | | Score | | Set 1 | Set 2 | Set 3 | Set 4 | Set 5 | Total | Report |
|---|---|---|---|---|---|---|---|---|---|---|---|
| 12 Sep | | Canada | 3–0 | Mexico | 15–10 | 15–3 | 15–5 | | | 45–18 | |
| 12 Sep | | Puerto Rico | 3–0 | Guatemala | 15–5 | 15–5 | 15–7 | | | 45–17 | |
| 13 Sep | | Mexico | 3–0 | Guatemala | 15–1 | 15–10 | 15–7 | | | 45–18 | |
| 13 Sep | | Canada | 3–1 | Puerto Rico | 6–15 | 15–10 | 15–11 | 15–10 | | 51–46 | |
| 14 Sep | | Canada | 3–0 | Guatemala | 15–3 | 15–7 | 15–0 | | | 45–10 | |
| 14 Sep | | Mexico | 3–0 | Puerto Rico | | | | | | | |

== Final round ==
Quarterfinals
16 September
Mexico | 3
Barbados | 0
16 September
United States | 3
Puerto Rico | 0

Semifinals
17 September
Cuba | 3
Mexico | 0
17 September
Canada | 1
United States | 3

Final
18 September
Cuba | 3
United States | 0
3rd place
18 September
Mexico | 1
Canada | 3

=== 7th place match ===
| Date | Time | | Score | | Set 1 | Set 2 | Set 3 | Set 4 | Set 5 | Total | Report |
|---|---|---|---|---|---|---|---|---|---|---|---|
| 16 Sep | | Dominican Republic | 3–0 | Guatemala | 17–15 | 15–3 | 15–5 | | | 47–23 | |

=== Quarterfinals ===
| Date | Time | | Score | | Set 1 | Set 2 | Set 3 | Set 4 | Set 5 | Total | Report |
|---|---|---|---|---|---|---|---|---|---|---|---|
| 16 Sep | | Mexico | 3–0 | Barbados | 15–12 | 15–8 | 15–8 | | | 45–28 | |
| 16 Sep | | United States | 3–0 | Puerto Rico | 15–12 | 15–11 | 15–12 | | | 45–35 | |

=== 5th place match ===
| Date | Time | | Score | | Set 1 | Set 2 | Set 3 | Set 4 | Set 5 | Total | Report |
|---|---|---|---|---|---|---|---|---|---|---|---|
| 17 Sep | | Puerto Rico | 3–0 | Barbados | | | | | | | |

=== Semifinals ===
| Date | Time | | Score | | Set 1 | Set 2 | Set 3 | Set 4 | Set 5 | Total | Report |
|---|---|---|---|---|---|---|---|---|---|---|---|
| 17 Sep | | Cuba | 3–0 | Mexico | 15–1 | 15–4 | 15–8 | | | 45–13 | |
| 17 Sep | | United States | 3–1 | Canada | 15–10 | 15–13 | 12–15 | 15–13 | | 57–51 | |

=== Bronze medal match ===
| Date | Time | | Score | | Set 1 | Set 2 | Set 3 | Set 4 | Set 5 | Total | Report |
|---|---|---|---|---|---|---|---|---|---|---|---|
| 18 Sep | | Canada | 3–1 | Mexico | 15–9 | 15–8 | 13–15 | 15–9 | | 58–41 | |

=== Final ===
| Date | Time | | Score | | Set 1 | Set 2 | Set 3 | Set 4 | Set 5 | Total | Report |
|---|---|---|---|---|---|---|---|---|---|---|---|
| 18 Sep | | Cuba | 3–0 | United States | 15–11 | 15–11 | 15–4 | | | 45–26 | |

== Final standing ==
| Rank | Team |
|---|---|
| 1st place, gold medalist(s) | Cuba |
| 2nd place, silver medalist(s) | United States |
| 3rd place, bronze medalist(s) | Canada |
| 4 | Mexico |
| 5 | Puerto Rico |
| 6 | Barbados |
| 7 | Dominican Republic |
| 8 | Guatemala |

| Qualified for the 1999 World Grand Champions Cup |

1997 Men's NORCECA champions

Cuba
12th title
