= Leo Carroll (volleyball) =

Canadian volleyball player (born 1983)

Leo Carroll (born July 6, 1983 in Edmonton, Alberta) is a male volleyball player from Canada, who competed for the Men's National Team as a middle-blocker at the Youth, Junior, National B, and National A level. He was a member of the national squad who finished in seventh place at the 2007 Pan American Games in Rio de Janeiro, Brazil.

He was the Assistant Coach with the University of British Columbia Men's Volleyball Team from 2008-2010, and he currently studies Medicine at the University College Cork, Cork, Ireland. In 2010 and 2011, he won back to back championships at the Irish Volleyball Intervarsities with the University College Cork team as a player/coach. The 2011 squad went on to win the 2011-2012 UK Volleyball Intervarsity Championship, and was awarded Best Team for the 2011-2012 season at the University College Cork by the Department of Athletics.
