= Men's NORCECA Volleyball Continental Championship =

North American continental men's volleyball tournament

- Most recent season or competition: 2026 Men's NORCECA Volleyball Championship
- Sport: Volleyball
- Founded: 1969; 57 years ago
- First season: 1969
- No. of teams: 8 (finals)
- Continent: North America, Central America and the Caribbean (NORCECA)
- Most recent champions: United States (11th title)
- Most titles: Cuba (16 titles)

The NORCECA Men's Volleyball Championship is the official competition for senior men's national volleyball teams of North America, Central America and the Caribbean, organized by the North, Central America and Caribbean Volleyball Confederation (NORCECA). Since its introduction in 1969 the tournaments have occurred every two years. The competition has been dominated by Cuba and United States, who have won together 27 of the 29 editions of the tournament.

== Results summary ==
Year	Host	Final			3rd place match			Teams
Year	Host	Champions	Score	Runners-up	3rd place	Score	4th place	Teams
1969; Details	Mexico City	Cuba	3–1	Mexico	United States	3–0	Canada	8
1971; Details	(Cuba); Havana	Cuba	Round-robin	United States	Mexico	Round-robin	Puerto Rico	5
1973; Details	(Mexico); Tijuana	United States	3–0	Cuba	Canada	3–1	Puerto Rico	7
1975; Details	(United States); Los Angeles	Cuba	Round-robin	Mexico	United States	Round-robin	Canada	5
1977; Details	(Dominican Republic); Santo Domingo	Cuba	3–0	Mexico	Canada	3–1	Puerto Rico	9
1979; Details	(Cuba); Havana	Cuba	Round-robin	Canada	Mexico	Round-robin	Dominican Republic	7
1981; Details	Mexico City	Cuba	3–2	United States	Canada	3–1	Mexico	10
1983; Details	(United States); Indianapolis	United States	Round-robin	Canada	Cuba	Round-robin	Mexico	6
1985; Details	(Dominican Republic); Santiago de los Caballeros	United States	3–1	Cuba	Canada	3–?	Dominican Republic	11
1987; Details	(Cuba); Havana	Cuba	3–2	United States	Canada	3–?	Dominican Republic	10
1989; Details	(Puerto Rico); San Juan	Cuba	3–0	Canada	United States	3–0	Puerto Rico	12
1991; Details	(Canada); Regina	Cuba	3–2	United States	Canada	3–?	Mexico	9
1993; Details	(United States); New Orleans	Cuba	3–1	United States	Canada	3–0	Puerto Rico	6
1995; Details	(Canada); Edmonton	Cuba	3–0	United States	Canada	3–0	Puerto Rico	7
1997; Details	(Puerto Rico); Caguas / San Juan	Cuba	3–0	United States	Canada	3–1	Mexico	8
1999; Details	(Mexico); Monterrey	United States	3–1	Cuba	Canada	3–2	Mexico	8
2001; Details	(Barbados); Bridgetown	Cuba	3–0	United States	Canada	3–0	Dominican Republic	7
2003; Details	(Mexico); Culiacán	United States	3–1	Canada	Cuba	3–0	Mexico	7
2005; Details	(Canada); Winnipeg	United States	3–1	Cuba	Canada	3–0	Dominican Republic	8
2007; Details	(United States); Anaheim	United States	3–1	Puerto Rico	Cuba	3–0	Canada	8
2009; Details	(Puerto Rico); Bayamón	Cuba	3–1	United States	Puerto Rico	3–2	Canada	8
2011; Details	(Puerto Rico); Mayagüez	Cuba	3–2	United States	Canada	3–0	Puerto Rico	8
2013; Details	(Canada); Langley	United States	3–0	Canada	Cuba	3–2	Puerto Rico	9
2015; Details	(Mexico); Córdoba	Canada	3–1	Cuba	Puerto Rico	3–0	Mexico	7
2017; Details	(United States); Colorado Springs	United States	3–0	Dominican Republic	Canada	3–1	Mexico	10
2019; Details	(Canada); Winnipeg	Cuba	3–1	United States	Canada	3–0	Mexico	7
2021; Details	(Mexico); Durango City	Puerto Rico	3–0	Canada	Mexico	3–1	Cuba	8
2023; Details	(United States); Charleston	United States	3–0	Canada	Cuba	3–0	Dominican Republic	7
2026; Details	(Canada); Moncton	United States	3–2	Canada	Cuba	3–0	Dominican Republic	8

== Medal table ==
Rank	Nation	Gold	Silver	Bronze	Total
1	Cuba	16	5	6	27
2	United States	11	11	3	25
3	Canada	1	8	15	24
4	Puerto Rico	1	1	2	4
5	Mexico	0	3	3	6
6	Dominican Republic	0	1	0	1
Totals (6 entries)		29	29	29	87

== Most valuable player by edition ==
- 1969 – 1999 – Unknown
- 2001 – (Cuba) Ángel Dennis
- 2003 – (United States) Clay Stanley
- 2005 – (Cuba) Raidel Poey
- 2007 – (United States) Lloy Ball
- 2009 – (Cuba) Wilfredo León
- 2011 – (Cuba) Keibel Gutiérrez
- 2013 – (United States) Matt Anderson
- 2015 – (Canada) Nicholas Hoag
- 2017 – (United States) Micah Christenson
- 2019 – (Cuba) Miguel Ángel López
- 2021 – (Puerto Rico) Arturo Iglesias
- 2023 – (United States) Micah Christenson
- 2026 – (United States) Erik Shoji

== See also ==
- NORCECA Women's Volleyball Championship
- Men's Junior NORCECA Volleyball Championship
- Boys' Youth NORCECA Volleyball Championship
- Volleyball at the Pan American Games
- Men's Pan-American Volleyball Cup
- Volleyball at the Central American and Caribbean Games
