= 2010 Men's Pan-American Volleyball Cup squads =

This article shows all participating team squads at the 2010 Men's Pan-American Volleyball Cup, held from May 22 to May 30, 2010 in San Juan, Puerto Rico.

== Argentina ==
- Head Coach: Alejandro Grossi

#	Name	Date of Birth	Height	Weight	Spike	Block
1	Mariano Giustiniano
2	Iván Castellani
4	Martín Ramos
7	Bruno Vinti
8	Demian González (c)
10	Juan Finoli
12	Federico Pereyra
13	Federico Franetovich
14	Pablo Crer
15	Andres Ribone
16	Cristian Poglajen
17	Franco López

== Brazil ==
- Head Coach: Roberley Leonaldo

#	Name	Date of Birth	Height	Weight	Spike	Block
1	Thiago Gelinsk
2	Rogeiro Nogueira
3	Mauricio Souza
9	Gustavo Bonatto
11	Bruno Araujo
12	Tiago Wesz
14	Renan Buiati
15	Mauricio Silva (c)
16	Carlos Faccin
17	Kaio Rocha
18	Leandro Greca
19	Isac Santos

== Canada ==
- Head Coach: Glenn Hoag

#	Name	Date of Birth	Height	Weight	Spike	Block
1	Louis-Pierre Mainville (c)
2	Nicholas Cundy
3	Daniel Lewis
7	Dallas Soonias
8	Adam Simac
9	Dustin Schneider
10	Toontje Van Lankvelt
12	Gavin Schmitt
13	Olivier Faucher
14	Adam Kaminski
15	Fred Winters
16	Steve Gotch

== Colombia ==
- Head Coach: Horacio Dileo

#	Name	Date of Birth	Height	Weight	Spike	Block
1	Ronald Jiménez
3	Adonis Herrera
4	Julián Vinazco
7	Humberto Machacón
9	Alexander Moreno (c)
10	Jefferson Perlaza
11	Juan Ambuila
12	Carlos Mosquera
14	Faver Rivas
15	Arnulfo Velásquez
17	Carlos Alomia
18	Daniel Vanegas

== Dominican Republic ==
- Head Coach: Jacinto Campechano

#	Name	Date of Birth	Height	Weight	Spike	Block
1	Elnis Palomino	2.07.1986	85	185	374	322
2	Luis De La Cruz
4	Franklin González
6	Pedro Luis García
7	Eduardo Concepción
10	Francisco Abreu López
11	José Miguel Cáceres	24.12.1981	96	210	361	340
12	Tolinson Aquino
13	Enmanuel Lara
15	Johan López Santos
16	Víctor Batista (c)	02.10.1979	90	199	350	340
17	Juan Carlos Cabrera

== Mexico ==
- Head Coach: Jorge Azair

#	Name	Date of Birth	Height	Weight	Spike	Block
1	Mario Becerra
2	Edgar Herrera
3	Héctor Burgos
5	Jesús Rangel
6	Samuel Cordova
7	Iván Contreras (c)
9	Jorge Quiñones
10	Pedro Rangel
12	Daniel Vargas
14	Tomás Aguilera
15	Leonardo Manzo
16	Jorge Barajas

== Puerto Rico ==
- Head Coach: Carlos Cardona

#	Name	Date of Birth	Height	Weight	Spike	Block
1	José Rivera	02.07.1977	85	192	325	320
2	Gregory Berrios	24.01.1979	83	182	305	299
3	Juan Figueroa	03.06.1986	88	189	299	292
4	Víctor Rivera	30.08.1976	88	195	345	329
5	Roberto Muñoz
6	Ángel Pérez	20.05.1982	86	190	325	318
7	Enrique Escalante	06.08.1984	88	195	330	324
10	Iván Pérez	13.02.1985	86	190	305	298
12	Héctor Soto (c)	20.06.1978	85	197	340	332
13	Alexis Matias	21.07.1974	88	195	335	325
14	Fernando Morales	04.02.1982	68	186	299	292
18	Edwin Aquino

== United States ==
- Head Coach: Richard Mclaughlin

#	Name	Date of Birth	Height	Weight	Spike	Block
1	Dustin Watten
2	Robert Tarr
3	Matthew Mckinney
5	Brian Thornton
6	Dean Bittner II
7	Max Lipsitz
10	David Smith
11	Tyler Hildebrand (c)
12	Carson Clark
13	Theodore Brunner
16	Jayson Jablonsky
19	Andrew McGuire

== Venezuela ==
- Head Coach: Iván Nieto

#	Name	Date of Birth	Height	Weight	Spike	Block
1	Emerson Rodríguez
2	Pedro Brito
4	Héctor Mata
5	Alejandro Sanoja
6	Carlos Páez (c)
8	Daniel Arteaga
9	Kervin Pinerua
10	Luis Auvert
11	Jhoser Contreras
14	Carlos Antonio
15	Henderson Espinoza
18	José Martínez
