= 2009 Men's NORCECA Volleyball Championship squads =

This article shows all participating team squads at the 2009 Men's NORCECA Volleyball Championship, held from October 12 to October 17 at the Coliseo Rubén Rodríguez in Bayamón, Puerto Rico.

== Canada ==
№	Name	Date of birth	Weight	2009 club
coach	Glenn Hoag	6 December 1958		Arkas Izmir
2	Nicholas Cundy	14 September 1983	194 cm (6 ft 4 in)	AS Cannes
3	Daniel Lewis	3 April 1976	190 cm (6 ft 3 in)	ACH Volley
4	Joshua Howatson	7 October 1984	199 cm (6 ft 6 in)	Maliye Milli Piyango
6	Justin Duff	10 May 1988	202 cm (6 ft 8 in)	hotVolleys Vienna
8	Adam Simac	9 August 1983	203 cm (6 ft 8 in)	ACH Volley
9	Dustin Schneider	30 May 1991	182 cm (6 ft 0 in)	S.L. Benfica
10	Toontje van Lankvelt	1 July 1984	197 cm (6 ft 6 in)	VC Asse-Lennik
11	Steve Brinkman	12 January 1978	202 cm (6 ft 8 in)	FC Tokyo
12	Gavin Schmitt	27 January 1986	204 cm (6 ft 8 in)	Samsung Bluefangs
15	Frederic Winters	25 September 1982	195 cm (6 ft 5 in)	VfB Friedrichshafen
17	Alexandre Gaumont	26 November 1984	195 cm (6 ft 5 in)	Beauvais Oise UC
18	John Perrin	17 August 1989	200 cm (6 ft 7 in)	Canada

== Cuba ==
№	Name	Date of birth	Weight	2009 club
coach	Orlando Samuels			
1	Wilfredo León	31 July 1993	201 cm (6 ft 7 in)	Orientales de Santiago
3	Gustavo Leyva	14 December 1985	180 cm (5 ft 11 in)	Capitalinos de Havana
4	Yassel Perdomo	23 March 1993	201 cm (6 ft 7 in)	Centrales
5	Leandro Macias	13 February 1990	192 cm (6 ft 4 in)	Orientales de Santiago
6	Keibel Gutiérrez	6 May 1987	178 cm (5 ft 10 in)	Orientales de Santiago
7	Osmany Camejo	18 February 1983	202 cm (6 ft 8 in)	Orientales de Santiago
10	Denny Hernandez	24 February 1994	190 cm (6 ft 3 in)	Pinar del Río
12	Henry Bell	27 July 1982	188 cm (6 ft 2 in)	Orientales de Santiago
14	Raidel Hierrezuelo	14 July 1987	196 cm (6 ft 5 in)	Capitalinos de Havana
16	Isbel Mesa	2 June 1989	204 cm (6 ft 8 in)	Orientales de Santiago
18	Yoandry Díaz	4 January 1985	196 cm (6 ft 5 in)	Orientales de Santiago
20	Fernando Hernández	11 September 1989	196 cm (6 ft 5 in)	Orientales de Santiago

== Mexico ==
№	Name	Date of birth	Weight	2009 club
coach	Jorge Azair			
2	Edgar Herrera	22 January 1988	194 cm (6 ft 4 in)	Chihuahua
6	Samuel Cordova	13 March 1989	190 cm (6 ft 3 in)	Sonora
7	Iván Contreras	29 January 1974	198 cm (6 ft 6 in)	Vt Roeselare
8	Ignacio Ramírez	19 September 1976	185 cm (6 ft 1 in)	Nayarit
11	Ismael Guerrero	15 March 1988	204 cm (6 ft 8 in)	Sinaloa
12	Daniel Vargas	1 September 1986	199 cm (6 ft 6 in)	UNAM
13	Marco Macías	12 February 1985	193 cm (6 ft 4 in)	Distrito Federal
14	Tomas Aguilera	15 November 1988	202 cm (6 ft 8 in)	CE Dos Hermanas
16	Jorge Barajas	7 May 1991	188 cm (6 ft 2 in)	Colima
17	Jorge Quiñones	13 November 1981	186 cm (6 ft 1 in)	Guanajuato
19	David Medina	12 April 1986		Chihuahua

== Puerto Rico ==
№	Name	Date of birth	Weight	2009 club
coach	Carlos Cardona			
1	José Rivera	2 July 1977	192 cm (6 ft 4 in)	Callipo Vibo Valentia
2	Gregory Berríos	24 January 1979	182 cm (6 ft 0 in)	GFCO Ajaccio
3	Juan Figueroa	3 June 1986	189 cm (6 ft 2 in)	Plataneros Corozal
4	Víctor Rivera	30 August 1976	195 cm (6 ft 5 in)	SPVB Poitiers
6	Roberto Muñiz	11 June 1980	196 cm (6 ft 5 in)	Leones de Ponce
7	Enrique Escalante	6 August 1984	195 cm (6 ft 5 in)	Paris Volley
9	Edgardo Goás	27 January 1989	193 cm (6 ft 4 in)	Penn State Univ.
13	Jean Carlos Ortíz	23 February 1988	193 cm (6 ft 4 in)	Indios de Mayagüez
14	Fernando Morales	4 February 1982	186 cm (6 ft 1 in)	Plataneros Corozal
15	Ezequiel Cruz	15 July 1986	191 cm (6 ft 3 in)	Plataneros Corozal
16	Sequiel Sánchez	24 March 1990	191 cm (6 ft 3 in)	Porto Rico
17	Pedro Sierra	21 July 1989	196 cm (6 ft 5 in)	

== United States ==
№	Name	Date of birth	Weight	2009 club
coach	Alan Knipe			
1	Matthew Anderson	18 April 1987	204 cm (6 ft 8 in)	Callipo Vibo Valentia
2	Sean Rooney	13 November 1982	206 cm (6 ft 9 in)	Gabeca Monza
3	Evan Patak	23 June 1984	201 cm (6 ft 7 in)	Korean Air Jumbos
4	David Lee	8 March 1982	203 cm (6 ft 8 in)	VK Kuzbass
5	Richard Lambourne	6 May 1975	190 cm (6 ft 3 in)	Fart Kielce
6	Paul Lotman	3 November 1985	200 cm (6 ft 7 in)	Blu Volley Verona
9	Ryan Millar	22 January 1978	204 cm (6 ft 8 in)	Resovia Rzeszów
13	Clayton Stanley	20 January 1978	205 cm (6 ft 9 in)	VK Ural Ufa
14	Kevin Hansen	19 March 1982	196 cm (6 ft 5 in)	Fakel Novyj Urengoj
15	Brian Thornton	22 April 1985	190 cm (6 ft 3 in)	Chaumont VB
16	Jayson Jablonsky	23 July 1985	198 cm (6 ft 6 in)	Olympiakos
17	Maxwell Holt	12 March 1987	205 cm (6 ft 9 in)	Pallavolo Piacenza
