= Changos de Naranjito =

Puerto Rican professional volleyball team

- Full name: Changos de Naranjito
- Founded: 1958
- Ground: Coliseum Gelito Ortega “El Nido”, Naranjito, Puerto Rico
- Owner: (Puerto Rico) Alexis Aponte
- League: LVSM

Uniforms
Home	Away

The Changos de Naranjito are a professional volleyball team based in Naranjito, Puerto Rico. The team is the most successful franchise in any sport in Puerto Rican sports history.

Known for their large fan base and record 24 national men's volleyball championships, the Changos de Naranjito are the winningest sports franchise in Puerto Rico. Their main rival is the Plataneros de Corozal. This rivalry has been labeled as "El Duelo de la Montana", because of their historical battles throughout the years and geographical proximity. They held a battle for the ages in the 2004 LVSM men's volleyball finals with the Changos defeating Corozal in a 7th game held at the Ruben Rodriguez Coliseum in Bayamón, Puerto Rico.

The team colors are: orange, white and black.

Chairman / Owner is Alexis Aponte

== Club history ==
The history of volleyball in Naranjito goes back to 1915.

In 1911, Reverend Howard T. Jason arrived in Naranjito to preach for the Presbyterian Church, finding resistance in this devoutly Catholic town. In 1915, two North American professors known as Mr. Esbaugh and Mr. Foster arrived in town and brought volleyball to Naranjito, attracting the town's youth. Reverend Jason took the opportunity to approach and share with the town's youth as well, helping the professors teach the game's rules, subsequently making friendships.

Reverend Jason remained in Naranjito until 1920, during which time he moved to the neighboring town of Corozal. Having now a good knowledge of the sport, he utilized the same technique of teaching the sport to young kids in order to get acceptance in town. Whenever he had the chance, Rev. Jason would create tournaments between teams both in Naranjito and in Corozal, which fueled a rivalry between both towns that lives to this day.

In 1938, Naranjito finally had a professional volleyball team, joining the North and South association as a professional team in 1940. Naranjito won five championships during this period.

In 1958, Naranjito joined the Puerto Rican Volleyball Federation.

== Club Record ==
Since 2004, Los Changos have the Guinness World Record in volleyball for the Most Championships in the world with 24 between 1958 and 2021.

== Club Results ==
The record of the Changos include in 66 seasons: 24 Championships, 12 Runners-up, 49 Semi finals, 6 consecutive championships 1988-1993, 5 consecutive championships 1995-1998, 2003–2007, 13 consecutive finals 1995-2007. In all seasons (1958-2024) the team reached 36 finals, won 24 championships and finished runners-up 12 times.

=== Championships ===
1958, 1959, 1967, 1969, 1970, 1985, 1986, 1988, 1989, 1990, 1991, 1992, 1993, 1995, 1996, 1997, 1998, 2001, 2003, 2004, 2005, 2006, 2007, 2021

=== Runner-up ===
1960, 1968, 1971, 1978, 1979, 1984, 1987, 1999, 2000, 2002, 2022, 2023

=== Semi Final's ===
1958, 1959, 1960, 1961, 1963, 1964, 1965, 1966, 1967, 1968, 1969, 1970, 1971, 1972, 1974, 1975, 1978, 1979, 1982, 1984, 1985, 1986, 1987, 1988, 1989, 1990, 1991, 1992, 1993, 1994, 1995, 1996, 1997, 1998, 1999, 2000, 2001, 2002, 2003, 2004, 2005, 2006, 2007, 2018, 2019, 2021, 2022, 2023, 2024

=== Individual awards ===
LVSM Most Valuable Player

- Ángel “Chomo” Rivera – 2021
- Luis "Feñito" Rodríguez – 1999
- Enrique "Papolito" López – 1991, 1993
- Hiram Padilla – 1992
- José L. Díaz – 1990
- Joey Rivera – 1985, 1986

LVSM Rookie of the Year

- Víctor "Vitito" Rivera – 1994
- Omar Rivera – 2007

LVSM Best Setter

- Juanmi Ruiz – 2023
- Juanmi Ruiz – 2022
- Esteban Rodríguez – 1999
- Enrique "Papolito" López – 1992
- Megan "Hazel" Mc Glone-- 1968

LVSM Best Blocker

- Hiram Padilla – 1991, 1989
- Willie de Jesús – 1990, 1994
- Victor Ruiz – 2010

LVSM Defensive Player of the Year

- Edwin Fernandez – 1986, 1987, 1989, 1990, 1991

LVSM Final Most Valuable Player

- Jackson Rivera - 2021
- Steve Klosterman - 2007
- Víctor "Vitito" Rivera – 1997, 2001, 2003, 2006
- Ángel Pérez – 2005
- Víctor "Chiqui" Bird – 2004
- José L. Díaz – 1998

Executive of the Year

- Ángel L. Colón – 2005

== Coliseum ==
The team always plays their home games at the Gelito Ortega Coliseum, “ El Nido” in Naranjito, which is located about 40 minutes from the Capital San Juan. The Coliseum has a capacity for 3,000 spectators.

== Staff ==
- (Puerto Rico) Alexis Aponte – Owner
- (Puerto Rico) Jamille Torres – Head Coach
- (Puerto Rico) Luis “Feñito” Rodríguez – Assistant Coach
- (Puerto Rico) Félix Román - Statistics
- (Puerto Rico) Geovanny Marrero – Physical Therapist
- (Puerto Rico) Fabián Amaya – Trainer
- (Puerto Rico) Pedro Rodríguez – Encargado de la Propiedad

== 2012-2013 TEAM ==
Note: Flags indicate national team as defined under FIFA eligibility rules; some limited exceptions apply. Players may hold more than one non-FIFA nationality.

No.	Pos.	Nation	Player
1		PUR	Victor Ruiz
2		CAN	Spencer Leiske
3		PUR	Edwin Santiago
12		PUR	Juan C. "Agujita" Rivera
19		CUB	Jorge Mencias
6		PUR	Carlos Morales
4		PUR	Juan Carlos Rodriguez
7		PUR	Sequiel Sanchez

No.	Pos.	Nation	Player
10		PUR	Jose Velez
15		PUR	Eliezer Oyola
9		CUB	Yunieski Ramirez
11		PUR	Arnel Cabrera
8		PUR	Luis Candelario
5		PUR	Milton Marrero
16		PUR	Noah Marrero
—		PUR	

== 2010-2011 TEAM ==
Note: Flags indicate national team as defined under FIFA eligibility rules; some limited exceptions apply. Players may hold more than one non-FIFA nationality.

No.	Pos.	Nation	Player
1		PUR	Sequiel Sanchez
2		PUR	Noah Marrero
3		USA	Mathew Propper
12		PUR	Juan C. "Agujita" Rivera
5		CUB	Jorge Mencias
6		PUR	Rafael Negron
7		PUR	Juan Carlos Rodriguez

No.	Pos.	Nation	Player
11		PUR	Jose Velez
13		PUR	Víctor Ruiz
14		USA	Matt Werle
15		PUR	Rafael Melendez
18		PUR	Omar Rivera
8		PUR	Gustavo Girau
—		PUR	

== 2009-2010 TEAM ==
Note: Flags indicate national team as defined under FIFA eligibility rules; some limited exceptions apply. Players may hold more than one non-FIFA nationality.

No.	Pos.	Nation	Player
1		PUR	Ángel Rivera
2		PUR	David León
3		USA	Andrew Hein
12		PUR	Juan C. "Agujita" Rivera
5		PUR	Joerel Morales
6		PUR	Juanmi Ruiz
7		PUR	Samuel Torres

No.	Pos.	Nation	Player
11		PUR	Eric Haddock
13		PUR	Víctor Ruiz
14		CRO	Mauro Miletic
15		PUR	Ángel Ruiz
18		PUR	Omar Rivera
—		PUR	
—		PUR	

== 2008 LVSM Division 1 season ==
This season was dedicated by the team for a local team-association "Los Batatas". Note: Flags indicate national team as defined under FIFA eligibility rules; some limited exceptions apply. Players may hold more than one non-FIFA nationality.

No.	Pos.	Nation	Player
5		PUR	Víctor "Chiqui" Bird
18		PUR	Omar Rivera
13		USA	Russell Holmes
12		PUR	Juan C. "Agujita" Rivera
11		PUR	Erick Haddock
15		PUR	Jorge Alifonso
10		PUR	Pablito Guzmán

No.	Pos.	Nation	Player
7		PUR	Milton Marrero
8		PUR	Miguel "Cundo" Rodríguez
3		USA	Tyler Hildebrand
16		CUB	Sirianis Méndez
14		PUR	Pedrito Rivera
2		PUR	José Bujosa
17		PUR	Ryan Underwood

=== 2007 LVSM Division 1 season ===
This season was dedicated by the team for the Modesto Nieves Family. Note: Flags indicate national team as defined under FIFA eligibility rules; some limited exceptions apply. Players may hold more than one non-FIFA nationality.

No.	Pos.	Nation	Player
2		USA	Tyler Hildebrand
18		PUR	Omar Rivera
14		USA	Steve Klosterman: Final MVP
12		PUR	Juan C. "Agujita" Rivera
11		PUR	Erick Haddock
13		USA	Robert Tarr
3		PUR	Emanuel Batista

No.	Pos.	Nation	Player
9		PUR	Luis "Feñito" Rodríguez
7		PUR	Dariel Rolón
16		PUR	Orlando Ortega
6		PUR	Eduardo Quiñones
10		PUR	Javier Feliciano
8		PUR	Jason Rodríguez
15		PUR	Ryan Underwood

=== 2006 LVSM Division 1 season ===
This season was dedicated by the team for the boxer Félix "Tito" Trinidad. Note: Flags indicate national team as defined under FIFA eligibility rules; some limited exceptions apply. Players may hold more than one non-FIFA nationality.

No.	Pos.	Nation	Player
1		PUR	Ángel Pérez
16		CAN	Terrence Martin
9		PUR	Luis "Feñito" Rodríguez
4		PUR	Víctor "Vitito" Rivera: Final MVP
11		PUR	Erick Haddock
8		USA	Matthew Denmark
5		PUR	Víctor "Chiqui" Bird
7		PUR	Dariel Rolón

No.	Pos.	Nation	Player
12		PUR	Elvyn Martínez
2		PUR	Joel A. Rivera
10		PUR	José José Delgado
3		PUR	Dennis Santiago
15		PUR	Ryan Underwood
6		PUR	Raymond Ocasio
—		PUR	Félix Campos

=== 2005 LVSM Division 1 season ===
This season was dedicated by the team in the memory of Roberto Walker Clemente. Note: Flags indicate national team as defined under FIFA eligibility rules; some limited exceptions apply. Players may hold more than one non-FIFA nationality.

No.	Pos.	Nation	Player
1		PUR	Ángel Pérez: Final MVP
16		CAN	Terrence Martin
9		PUR	Luis "Feñito" Rodríguez
4		PUR	Víctor "Vitito" Rivera
3		PUR	Ossie Antonetti
7		CUB	Maikel Cardona
5		PUR	Víctor "Chiqui" Bird

No.	Pos.	Nation	Player
6		PUR	Gregory Berrios
11		PUR	Erick Haddock
12		PUR	Elvyn Martínez
14		PUR	Dariel Rolón
10		PUR	Abdel Otero
2		PUR	Héctor Lebrón

=== 2004 LVSM Division 1 season ===
Note: Flags indicate national team as defined under FIFA eligibility rules; some limited exceptions apply. Players may hold more than one non-FIFA nationality.

No.	Pos.	Nation	Player
1		PUR	Ángel Pérez
9		PUR	Luis "Feñito" Rodríguez
4		PUR	Víctor "Vitito" Rivera
3		PUR	Ossie Antonetti
7		CUB	Maikel Cardona
5		PUR	Víctor "Chiqui" Bird: Final MVP
8		USA	Matthew Denmark

No.	Pos.	Nation	Player
6		PUR	Gregory Berrios
11		PUR	Erick Haddock
12		PUR	Juan C. "Agujita" Rivera
2		PUR	Esteban Rodríguez
10		PUR	Abdel Otero
13		PUR	Alexander Pérez

=== 2003 LVSM Division 1 season ===
This season was dedicated by the team in the memory of Maralisa Colón Berríos. Note: Flags indicate national team as defined under FIFA eligibility rules; some limited exceptions apply. Players may hold more than one non-FIFA nationality.

No.	Pos.	Nation	Player
1		PUR	Ángel Pérez
9		PUR	Luis "Feñito" Rodríguez
4		PUR	Víctor "Vitito" Rivera: Final MVP
3		PUR	Ossie Antonetti
7		CAN	Jason Haldane
5		PUR	Víctor "Chiqui" Bird
8		PUR	Enrique "Papolito" López

No.	Pos.	Nation	Player
6		PUR	Gregory Berrios
11		PUR	Erick Haddock
12		PUR	Joel A. Rivera
2		PUR	Willie de Jesús
—		PUR	Jorgito Otero
10		PUR	Abdel Otero
15		PUR	Héctor “Tito” Núñez

== Coaches ==
Name	Nat	Managerial Tenure
David Alemán	(Puerto Rico)	1998–2000
Hiram Padilla	(Puerto Rico)	2001–2002
Enrique Ruiz	(Puerto Rico)	2003–2004
David Alemán	(Puerto Rico)	2005–2007
José L. Díaz	(Puerto Rico)	2007–2008
Rigo Guilloty	(Puerto Rico)	2009–2009
Enrique López	(Puerto Rico)	2009–2011
Luis Enrique "Quique" Ruiz	(Puerto Rico)	2012
Jamille Torres	(Puerto Rico)	2017–Present
