= Liga de Voleibol Superior Masculino =

Men's professional volleyball league in Puerto Rico

Liga de Voleibol Superior Masculino (LVSM)
- Current season, competition or edition: 2026 Liga de Voleibol Superior Masculino
- Sport: Volleyball
- Founded: 1958
- CEO: Jaime Vázquez
- No. of teams: 6
- Country: Puerto Rico
- Continent: North America
- Most recent champion: Cafeteros de Yauco
- Most titles: Changos de Naranjito (24 titles)
- Level on pyramid: 1
- Website: fedpurvoli.com

The Liga de Voleibol Superior Masculino (LVSM) is a men's professional volleyball league in Puerto Rico. The competitions are organized by the Puerto Rican Volleyball Federation (Federación Puertorriqueña de Voleibol, FPV).

== History ==
Volleyball arrived in Puerto Rico following the arrival of Americans to the island, through the Young Men’s Christian Association (YMCA). It spread throughout the island thanks to American teachers. The sport gradually became part of Puerto Rican culture, eventually becoming one of the most popular.

The Federación Puertorriqueña de Voleibol (FPV) established a professional men's volleyball league. In its first season, held in 1958, 10 teams participated: Santurce, Hato Rey, Army, Aguada, Ciales, Guayama, Ponce, Yauco, Naranjito, and Río Piedras. Naranjito was crowned champion after defeating Río Piedras in the finals.

== Teams ==
=== Current teams ===
Current location of the teams competing in the 2026 season

Team		Home city	Notes
ADJ	Gigantes de Adjuntas	Adjuntas	
CAR	Gigantes de Carolina	Carolina	Formerly known as Nuevos Gigantes de Carolina
COR	Plataneros de Corozal	Corozal	
LAR	Patriotas de Lares	Lares	Formerly known as Lares Septiembre 23; different from Patriotas de San Juan and Leñeros de Lares
NAR	Changos de Naranjito	Naranjito	
YAU	Cafeteros de Yauco	Yauco	Current champion; different from Indios de Yauco

=== Inactive teams ===
Team	Home city	Notes
Mets de Guaynabo	Guaynabo	
Caribes de San Sebastián	San Sebastián	Current runner-up

=== Former teams ===
Team	Home city	Notes
Atenienses de Manatí	Manatí	
Atléticos de San Germán	San Germán	
Bravos de Cidra	Cidra	
Brujos de Guayama	Guayama	
Bucaneros de Arroyo	Arroyo	
Caciques de Jayuya	Jayuya	Different from Caciques de Mayagüez
Cangrejeros de Santurce	San Juan	
Capitanes de Arecibo	Arecibo	
Cardenales de Río Piedras	San Juan	
Cariduros de Fajardo	Fajardo	
Cocoteros de Isla Verde	Carolina	
Corsarios de Cabo Rojo	Cabo Rojo	
Criollos de Caguas	Caguas	
Delfines de Trujillo Alto	Trujillo Alto	Formerly known as Round Hill
Guayacanes de Guayanilla	Guayanilla	
Indios de Mayagüez	Mayagüez	Formerly kown as Caciques de Mayagüez; different from Indios de Yauco and Caciques de Jayuya
Indios de Yauco	Yauco	Different from Indios de Mayagüez and Cafeteros de Yauco
Joscos de Toa Alta	Toa Alta	
Leñeros de Lares	Lares	Different from Patriotas de Lares
Leones de Ponce	Ponce	
Llaneros de Toa Baja	Toa Baja	
Maratonistas de Coamo	Coamo	
Montañeses de Utuado	Utuado	
Mulos de Juncos	Juncos	Also known as Mulos del Valenciano
Patriotas de San Juan	San Juan	Formerly known as Playeros de San Juan; different from Patriotas de Lares
Petateros de Sabana Grande	Sabana Grande	
Potros de Santa Isabel	Santa Isabel	
Rebeldes de Moca	Moca	Formerly known as Vampiros de Moca
Samaritanos de San Lorenzo	San Lorenzo	
Tigres de Ensenada	Guánica	
Toritos de Cayey	Cayey	
Vaqueros de Bayamón	Bayamón	
Voleitrotters de Caparra	Bayamón–Guaynabo	

== League champions ==
Year	Champion	Runner-up	MVP
1958	Changos de Naranjito	Cardenales de Río Piedras	
1959	Changos de Naranjito	Cafeteros de Yauco	
1960	Brujos de Guayama	Cafeteros de Yauco	
1961	Cafeteros de Yauco	Leones de Ponce	
1962	Cafeteros de Yauco	Leones de Ponce	
1963	Leones de Ponce	Cafeteros de Yauco	
1964	Leones de Ponce	Cafeteros de Yauco	
1965	Leones de Ponce	Cafeteros de Yauco	
1966	Cafeteros de Yauco	Brujos de Guayama	
1967	Changos de Naranjito	Leones de Ponce	
1968	Cafeteros de Yauco	Changos de Naranjito	
1969	Changos de Naranjito	Cafeteros de Yauco	
1970	Changos de Naranjito	Cafeteros de Yauco	
1971	Cafeteros de Yauco	Changos de Naranjito	
1972	Final series between Cafeteros de Yauco and Changos de Naranjito was suspended (2–1)		
1973	Gigantes de Adjuntas	Cafeteros de Yauco	
1974	Season suspended		
1975	Final series between Cafeteros de Yauco and Gigantes de Adjuntas was suspended (3–3)		
1976	Mets de Guaynabo	Plataneros de Corozal	
1977	Plataneros de Corozal	Mets de Guaynabo	
1978	Plataneros de Corozal	Changos de Naranjito	
1979	Plataneros de Corozal	Changos de Naranjito	
1980	Plataneros de Corozal	Patriotas de Lares	
1981	Patriotas de Lares	Plataneros de Corozal	
1982	Plataneros de Corozal	Patriotas de Lares	
1983	Patriotas de Lares	Plataneros de Corozal	
1984	Plataneros de Corozal	Changos de Naranjito	
1985	Changos de Naranjito	Plataneros de Corozal	
1986	Changos de Naranjito	Plataneros de Corozal	
1987	Plataneros de Corozal	Changos de Naranjito	
1988	Changos de Naranjito	Caribes de San Sebastián	
1989	Changos de Naranjito	Caribes de San Sebastián	
1990	Changos de Naranjito	Plataneros de Corozal	
1991	Changos de Naranjito	Plataneros de Corozal	
1992	Changos de Naranjito	Plataneros de Corozal	
1993	Changos de Naranjito	Plataneros de Corozal	
1994	Leones de Ponce	Plataneros de Corozal	
1995	Changos de Naranjito	Playeros de San Juan	
1996	Changos de Naranjito	Cafeteros de Yauco	
1997	Changos de Naranjito	Patriotas de Lares	(Puerto Rico) Víctor Rivera
1998	Changos de Naranjito	Rebeldes de Moca	(Puerto Rico) José Díaz
1999	Caribes de San Sebastián	Changos de Naranjito	
2000	Rebeldes de Moca	Changos de Naranjito	
2001	Changos de Naranjito	Caribes de San Sebastián	(Puerto Rico) Luis "Feñito" Rodríguez
2002	Patriotas de Lares	Changos de Naranjito	(Venezuela) José Matheus
2003	Changos de Naranjito	Playeros de San Juan	(Puerto Rico) Víctor Rivera
2004	Changos de Naranjito	Plataneros de Corozal	(Mexico) Iván Contreras
2005	Changos de Naranjito	Caribes de San Sebastián	(Puerto Rico) Brook Billings
2006	Changos de Naranjito	Gigantes de Adjuntas	(Brazil) Fabricio Dias
2007	Changos de Naranjito	Caribes de San Sebastián	(United States) Jeff Ptak
2008	Plataneros de Corozal	Patriotas de Lares	(United States) David McKienzie
2009–10	Plataneros de Corozal	Mets de Guaynabo	(United States) Casey Patterson
2010	Nuevos Gigantes de Carolina	Plataneros de Corozal	(Puerto Rico) José Rivera
2011–12	Cariduros de Fajardo	Patriotas de Lares	(Cuba) Leonardo Leyva
2012–13	Capitanes de Arecibo	Mets de Guaynabo	(Puerto Rico) Luis "Feñito" Rodríguez
2013–14	Mets de Guaynabo	Capitanes de Arecibo	(Puerto Rico) Pablo Guzmán
2014	Capitanes de Arecibo	Mets de Guaynabo	(Puerto Rico) David Menéndez
2015	Mets de Guaynabo	Gigantes de Carolina	(Puerto Rico) Juan Vázquez
2016–17	Mets de Guaynabo	Caribes de San Sebastián	(Puerto Rico) Ángel Pérez
2017	Season suspended because of Hurricane Maria		
2018	Mets de Guaynabo	Gigantes de Adjuntas	(Puerto Rico) Maurice Torres
2019	Mets de Guaynabo	Indios de Mayagüez	(Cuba) Inovel Romero
2020	Season suspended because of COVID-19 pandemic		
2021	Changos de Naranjito	Caribes de San Sebastián	(Puerto Rico) Jackson Rivera
2022	Mets de Guaynabo	Changos de Naranjito	(Puerto Rico) Kevin Rodríguez
2023	Caribes de San Sebastián	Changos de Naranjito	(Puerto Rico) Pelegrín Vargas
2024	Caribes de San Sebastián	Mets de Guaynabo	(Puerto Rico) Pablo Guzmán
2025	Cafeteros de Yauco	Caribes de San Sebastián	(Puerto Rico) Kevin Rodríguez

=== Section B ===
Year	Champion	Runner-up	MVP
1986	Leñeros de Lares	Leones de Ponce	
1987	Criollos de Caguas	Leones de Ponce	
1988	Leones de Ponce	Patriotas de Lares	
1989	Cafeteros de Yauco	Playeros de San Juan	
1990	Patriotas de Lares	Corsarios de Cabo Rojo	
1991	Vampiros de Moca	Gigantes de Adjuntas	

== Performances ==
=== Performance by club ===
Club	Winners	Runners-up	Winning years	Runner-up years
Changos de Naranjito	24	11	1958, 1959, 1967, 1969, 1970, 1985, 1986, 1988, 1989, 1990, 1991, 1992, 1993, 1995, 1996, 1997, 1998, 2001, 2003, 2004, 2005, 2006, 2007, 2021	1968, 1971, 1978, 1979, 1984, 1987, 1999, 2000, 2002, 2022, 2023
Plataneros de Corozal	9	12	1977, 1978, 1979, 1980, 1982, 1984, 1987, 2008, 2009–10	1976, 1981, 1983, 1985, 1986, 1990, 1991, 1992, 1993, 1994, 2004, 2010
Cafeteros de Yauco	7	9	1961, 1962, 1966, 1968, 1971, 1989, (Note: Championship won in section B.) 2025	1959, 1960, 1963, 1964, 1965, 1969, 1970, 1973, 1996
Mets de Guaynabo	7	5	1976, 2013–14, 2015, 2016–17, 2018, 2019, 2022	1977, 2009–10, 2012–13, 2014, 2024
Leones de Ponce	5	5	1963, 1964, 1965, 1988, 1994	1961, 1962, 1967, 1986, (Note: Runner-up position achieved in section B.) 1987
Patriotas de Lares	4	6	1981, 1983, 1990, 2002	1980, 1982, 1988, 1997, 2008, 2011–12
Caribes de San Sebastián	3	8	1999, 2023, 2024	1988, 1989, 2001, 2005, 2007, 2016–17, 2021, 2025
Rebeldes de Moca	2	1	1991, 2000	1998
Capitanes de Arecibo	2	1	2012–13, 2014	2013–14
Gigantes de Adjuntas	1	3	1973	1991, 2006, 2018
Brujos de Guayama	1	1	1960	1966
Gigantes de Carolina	1	1	2010	2015
Leñeros de Lares	1	–	1986	–
Criollos de Caguas	1	–	1987	–
Cariduros de Fajardo	1	–	2011–12	–
Patriotas de San Juan	–	3	–	1989, 1995, 2003
Cardenales de Río Piedras	–	1	–	1958
Corsarios de Cabo Rojo	–	1	–	1990

=== Performance by municipality ===
Municipality	Winners	Runners-up
Naranjito	24	11
Corozal	9	12
Yauco	7	9
Guaynabo	7	5
Lares	5	6
Ponce	5	5
San Sebastián	3	8
Moca	2	1
Arecibo	2	1
Adjuntas	1	3
Guayama	1	1
Carolina	1	1
Caguas	1	–
Fajardo	1	–
San Juan	–	4
Cabo Rojo	–	1
