= 2013 Final Four =

2013 Final Four may refer to:

- 2013 NCAA Men's Division I Basketball Tournament
- 2013 NCAA Women's Division I Basketball Tournament
- 2013 Final Four Men's Volleyball Cup
