= Steve Klosterman =

American volleyball coach and former player

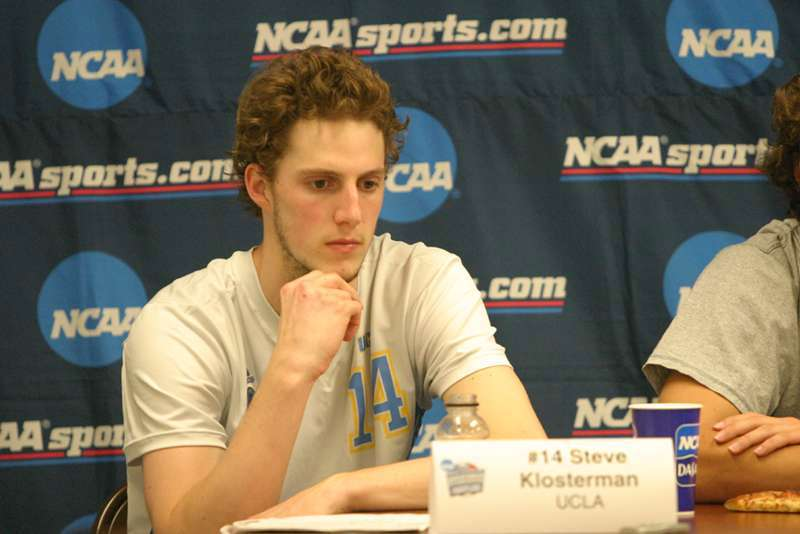
- Klosterman at an NCAA press conference, 2007

Personal information
- Born: Steven Robert Klosterman c. 1984 (age 41–42)
- Hometown: Long Beach, California
- Height: 6 ft 7 in (201 cm)
- Education: University of California, Los Angeles

Coaching information
- Current team: Hofstra Pride Women's Volleyball

Volleyball information
- Position: Opposite hitter

Career
Years	Teams
2007-2008	Naranjito Changos
2008—?	Los Patriotas de Lares
?	Police United
2011	Spacer's Toulouse Volley
2012—?	Nuevos Gigantes de Carolina
2014	SKV Havířov

Steve Klosterman (born c. 1984) is an American college volleyball coach and former player. After a successful career as part of the UCLA Bruins, he spent nearly a decade playing internationally. Klosterman then returned to the United States to start his coaching career. He joined Hofstra University's women's volleyball coaching team in 2019 and was promoted to assistant coach in 2024.

While an opposite at UCLA, he broke multiple all-time institutional records, several of which he still held in 2025: most single season points (553.5, 2007); single-match consecutive kills (31, 2007); career kills (1,513); total attacks (3,262); kills per set (4.29, 2007; 4.12, 2006); total attacks (1,016, 2006; 994, 2007); and total points (1,757).

== Playing career ==
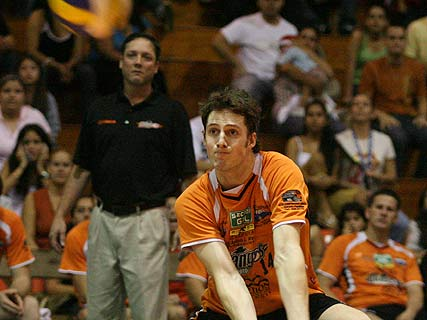
Klosterman in a playoff match, 2007

A Long Beach native, Klosterman attended St. John Bosco High School, where he was one of two sophomores named to the All-Southern Section team, before transferring to Marina High School following the school year. In addition to volleyball, he also played football and basketball. He was a six-time varsity letterman; a three-time all-league player; and was voted Sunset League MVP as a senior. He was also a three-time Junior Olympic gold medalist and two-time MVP. He was one of three high school students invited to try out for the FISU World University Games in 2003 but had to return home after sustaining a concussion. The Los Angeles Times described him as the No. 1 "high school prospect in the nation" during his junior year.

Klosterman started at University of California, Los Angeles in 2003, majoring in history. He received an MPSF Honorable Mention in 2004 during his freshman year, but was forced to sit out during his sophomore year due to a torn labrum, for which he received surgery in June 2005. In the 2006 season, he was part of the team that defeated Penn State at the NCAA Championship finals and was subsequently chosen as Most Outstanding Player after scoring 32 points and hitting .379 in just two matches. He was also named a second-team All-American and received another MPSF honorable mention. At this time, he was tied at the #19 rank nationally at 4.12 kills per game and recorded his collegiate career high of 32 points and 30 kills in a single game against the College of Southern Nevada. Entering his senior year, he was ranked ninth on the all-time UCLA career kills list at 1,041. For the 2007 season, he was again made an All-American.

Klosterman was also a member of the USA Youth National Team, the Junior National Team, and the World University Games training team. In 2009, he was a member of the USAV training team.

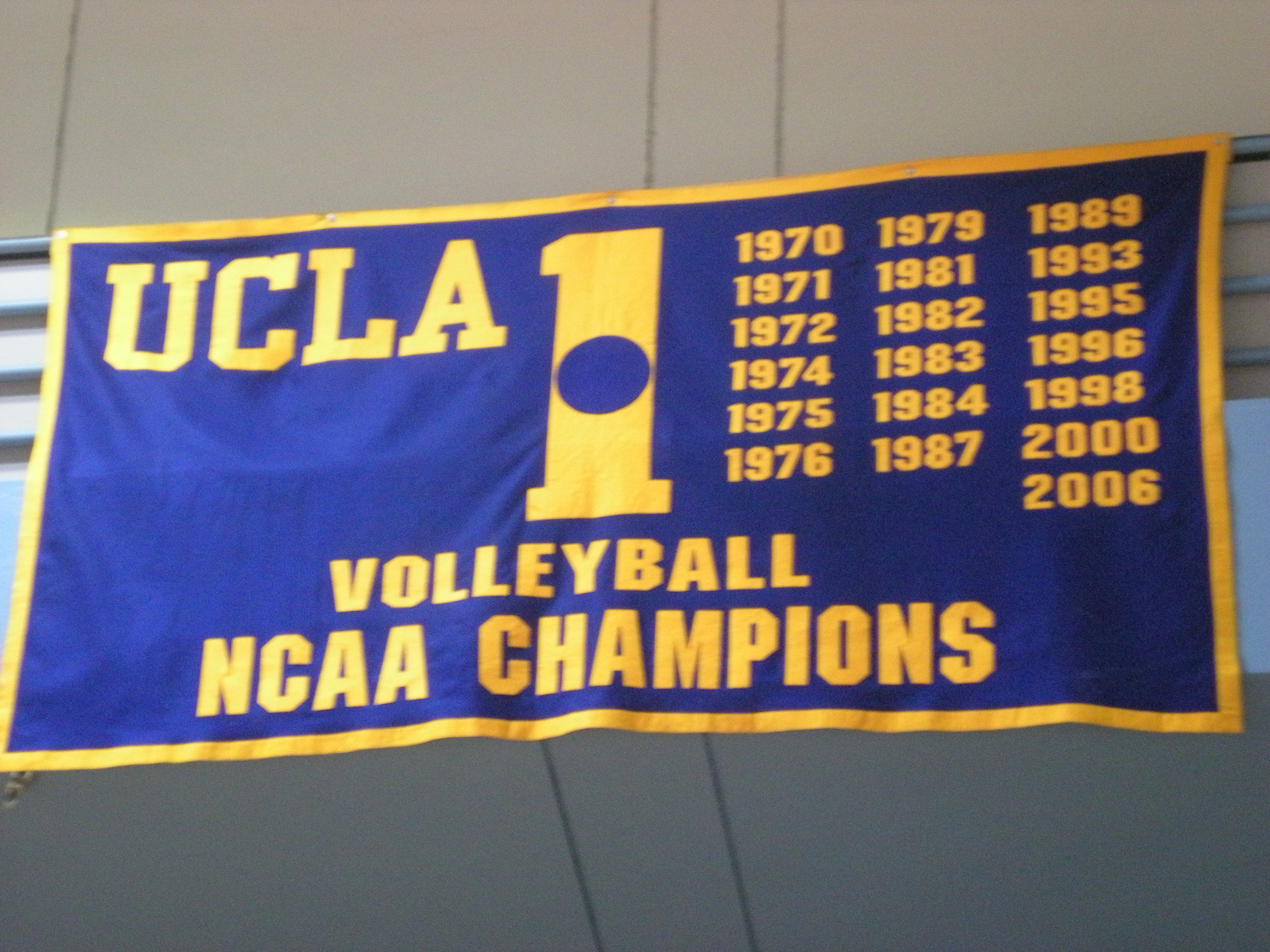
Championship banner hanging in Pauley Pavilion

As of 2025, Klosterman still held the following all-time UCLA records: single season points (553.5, 2007); single-match consecutive kills (31, 2007); career kills (1,513); total attacks (3,262); kills per set (4.29, 2007; 4.12, 2006); total attacks (1,016, 2006; 994, 2007); and total points (1,757). Additionally, he is second and third for single season kills (472, 2007; 466, 2006); fourth for career kills (1,513); fifth for total aces (79) and block solos (39); sixth for career kills per game (3.84); and seventh for total blocks (292). He also had 76 career double-digit kill matches.

=== International ===
Following graduation from UCLA in 2007, Klosterman played volleyball internationally for eight years in Puerto Rico, France, Finland, UAE, Egypt, Qatar, Vietnam, and the Czech Republic. For the 2007–2008 season, he joined the LVSM team Naranjito Changos and was named 2008 MVP in the championships. He then played for Los Patriotas de Lares. After spending some time in Dubai, he joined Police United in Doha. He arrived in Toulouse in February 2011 and joined Spacer's Toulouse Volley. He helped revive the team and they avoided being demoted from Ligue A to Ligue B. By 2012, he had returned to Puerto Rico and was playing for Nuevos Gigantes de Carolina. He spent some time in Vietnam before his former Spacer's teammate, Tomáš Jambor, invited him to join SKV Havířov in the Czech Republic in 2014.

== Coaching career ==
In 2008, Klosterman was volunteer assistant coach for the UCLA men's volleyball and was responsible for the scout team. He spent more than ten years working with the Huntington Beach Volleyball Club as both head and assistant coach, coaching rising talent including TJ DeFalco. He joined Orangewood Academy as coach in 2017, then served as volunteer assistant coach for the women's volleyball team at Loyola University Chicago. He joined Hofstra University's women's volleyball coaching team in fall 2019 and was promoted to assistant coach in June 2024. Other coaching activities include working as men's camp coach at Loyola in summer 2018 and serving as lead technical coach and trainer for Chicago Bounce Volleyball.
