= Carlos Páez =

Carlos Páez may refer to:

- Carlos Páez Vilaró (1923–2014), Uruguayan artist
- Carlos Páez Rodríguez, his son, one of the sixteen survivors of Uruguayan Air Force Flight 571
- Carlos Páez (footballer) (born 1998), footballer from Colombia
- Carlos Páez (volleyball) (born 1991), Venezuelan volleyball player in 2010 Men's Pan-American Volleyball Cup squads
