= 2013 Men's NORCECA Volleyball Final Four Cup =

2013 Final Four Men's Volleyball Cup
Tournament details
- Host country: Mexico
- Dates: November 6–9, 2013
- Teams: 4
- Venue: 1 (in Monterrey host cities)

Final positions
- Champions: Mexico (1st title)

Tournament awards
- MVP: Tomás Aguilera (MEX)

The 2013 Final Four Men's Volleyball Cup was the first edition of the annual men's volleyball tournament, played by four countries from November 6–9, 2013 in Monterrey, Mexico. Mexico won the event with the Dominican Republic in second place and Canada won the bronze over the fourth place, Venezuela. The Mexican Tomás Aguilera was awarded Most Valuable Player.

== Competing nations ==
Group A —

Canada
Mexico
Dominican Republic
Venezuela

== Round robin ==
| Pos | Team | Pld | W | L | Pts | SPW | SPL | SPR | SW | SL | SR |
|---|---|---|---|---|---|---|---|---|---|---|---|
| 1 | Mexico | 3 | 3 | 0 | 14 | 249 | 197 | 1.264 | 9 | 1 | 9.000 |
| 2 | Dominican Republic | 3 | 2 | 1 | 10 | 239 | 257 | 0.930 | 7 | 4 | 1.750 |
| 3 | Canada | 3 | 1 | 2 | 5 | 200 | 212 | 0.943 | 3 | 6 | 0.500 |
| 4 | Venezuela | 3 | 0 | 3 | 1 | 219 | 241 | 0.909 | 1 | 9 | 0.111 |

| Date | Time | | Score | | Set 1 | Set 2 | Set 3 | Set 4 | Set 5 | Total | Report |
|---|---|---|---|---|---|---|---|---|---|---|---|
| 6 Nov | 17:00 | Venezuela | 0–3 | Canada | 20–25 | 22–25 | 18–25 | | | 60–75 | P2 P3 |
| 6 Nov | 19:00 | Mexico | 3–1 | Dominican Republic | 25–18 | 25–17 | 21–25 | 25–14 | | 96–74 | P2 P3 |
| 7 Nov | 17:00 | Canada | 0–3 | Dominican Republic | 22-25 | 22-25 | 21-25 | | | 65–0 | P2 P3 |
| 7 Nov | 19:00 | Mexico | 3–0 | Venezuela | 25-22 | 25-17 | 26-24 | | | 76–0 | P2 P3 |
| 8 Nov | 17:00 | Dominican Republic | 3–1 | Venezuela | 25-23 | 12-25 | 25-22 | 28-26 | | 90–0 | P2 P3 |
| 8 Nov | 19:00 | Mexico | 3–0 | Canada | 25-16 | 25-19 | 27-25 | | | 77–0 | P2 P3 |

== Final ==
| Date | Time | | Score | | Set 1 | Set 2 | Set 3 | Set 4 | Set 5 | Total | Report |
|---|---|---|---|---|---|---|---|---|---|---|---|
| 9 Nov | 14:00 | Canada | 0-3 | Venezuela | 22-25 | 19-25 | 19-25 | | | 60–0 | P2 P3 |
| 9 Nov | 16:00 | Mexico | 3–0 | Dominican Republic | 25-17 | 25–23 | 25–17 | | | 75–40 | P2 P3 |

== Final standing ==
| Rank | Team |
|---|---|
| Gold medal | Mexico |
| Silver medal | Dominican Republic |
| Bronze medal | Venezuela |
| 4 | Canada |

2013 Men's Final Four Cup champions

Mexico
First title

12–man Roster
Jesús Valdez, Gonzalo Ruiz, Jesús Rangel, José Mendoza Perdomo, Édgar Herrera, Pedro Rangel, Jorge Barajas, Guerson Acosta, Samuel Córdova, Tomás Aguilera, Néstor Orellana, Iván Márquez
Head coach
Jorge Azair

== Awards ==
- Most valuable player
  (Mexico) Tomás Aguilera
- Best scorer
  (Dominican Republic) Henry Tapia
- Best spiker
  (Mexico) Jesús Valdez
- Best blocker
  (Mexico) Samuel Cordón
- Best server
  (Dominican Republic) Elnis Palomino
- Best setter
  (Mexico) Pedro Rangel
- Best libero
  (Canada) Marshall Douglas
- Best receiver
  (Venezuela) Héctor Salerno
- Best libero
  (Dominican Republic) Edwin Peguero
