= Kevin Rivers (beach volleyball) =

Trinidad and Tobago beach volleyball player

Personal information
- Nationality: Trinidad and Tobago

Beach volleyball information

Current teammate
Years	Teammate
2009	Christian Francois

Kevin Rivers is a male beach volleyball and volleyball player from Trinidad and Tobago.

He played in the men's competition at the NORCECA Beach Volleyball Circuit 2009 playing with Christian Francois

He won the 2008 National Beach Volleyball Championship playing with Christian Francois. The previous year he had won the silver medal playing with the same partner. They also won the bronze medal at the Sizzlin Sand Beach Volleyball Tour 2008 in Antigua

Playing Indoor volleyball, he participated in the 2006 Central American and Caribbean Games and Pan-American Cup 2008 with his National team.

== Clubs ==
- (Trinidad and Tobago) West Side Stars (2009)

== Awards ==
=== Individuals ===
- 2007 Trinidad and Tobago A Division National League "Best Libero"
- 2007 Trinidad and Tobago A Division National League "Best Digger"

=== National team ===
- Trinidad and Tobago Beach Volleyball Championship 2008 Gold Medal
- Trinidad and Tobago Beach Volleyball Championship 2007 Silver Medal
- Sizzlin Sand Beach Volleyball Tour 2008 Antigua Bronze Medal
