= Fernando Morales (volleyball) =

Puerto Rican volleyball player (born 1982)

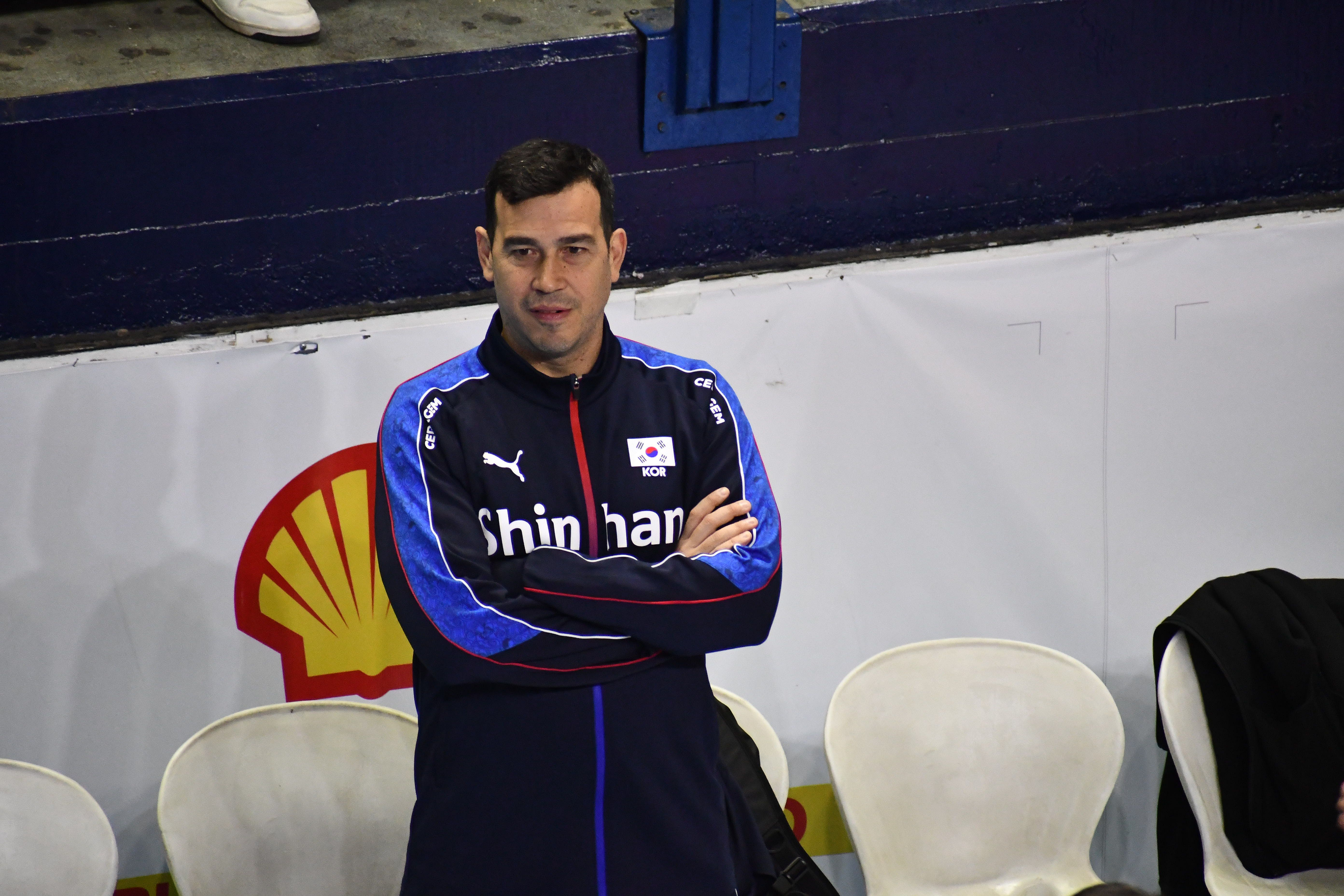
- Morales in 2024

Personal information
- Full name: Fernando Javier Morales López
- Nationality: Puerto Rico
- Born: February 4, 1982 (age 44); San Juan, Puerto Rico
- Hometown: San Juan, Puerto Rico
- Height: 1.94 m (6 ft 4 in)
- Weight: 93 kg (205 lb)

Volleyball information
- Position: Setter

National team
2001–2014	Puerto Rico
Medal record
Men's volleyball
Representing Puerto Rico
Pan-American Cup
Silver medal – second place	2007 Santo Domingo	Team
Bronze medal – third place	2010 San Juan	Team
- Last updated: June 2025

Fernando Javier Morales López (born February 4, 1982) is a Puerto Rican former volleyball player and currently coach of South Korea women's national volleyball team.

He was a member of the men's national team that ended in second place at the 2007 Pan-American Cup in Santo Domingo, Dominican Republic. There he was named Best Setter of the tournament, the same title he won in the 2009 edition of the same event. He won with his team the bronze medal at the 2010 Pan-American Cup. He is the son of Puerto Rican basketball legend Mario "Quijote" Morales and volleyball player María López, and the nephew of the basketball player Federico López.

== Clubs ==
- (Puerto Rico) Playeros de San Juan (2000)
- (Puerto Rico) Caribes San Sebastian (2001–2002)
- (Puerto Rico) Criollos de Caguas (2003–2005)
- (Spain) Probisa Málaga (2004–2005)
- (Puerto Rico) Patriotas de Lares (2006)
- (Austria) HYPO VBK Klagenfurt (2005–2006)
- (Austria) Hypo Tirol Innsbruck (2006–2007)
- (France) GFCO Ajaccio (2007–2008)
- (Puerto Rico) Plataneros de Corozal (2008)
- (Austria) Aon hotVolleys Vienna (2008–2009)
- (Puerto Rico) Plataneros de Corozal (2009–2010)
- (Cyprus) AEK Karavas (2010–2011)
- (Cyprus) AEK Karavas (2011–2012)
- (Puerto Rico) Plataneros de Corozal (2012)
- (Russia) Enisey Krasnoyarsk (2013–2014)

== Awards ==
=== Individuals ===
- 2007 Pan-American Cup "Best Setter"
- 2008, 2009, 2010 Puerto Rican league "Best Setter"
- 2008, 2010 Puerto Rican League "Best Server"
- 2008 Puerto Rican League "MVP"
- 2009 Pan-American Cup "Best Setter"

=== Clubs ===
- 2008, 2009–2010 Liga de Voleibol Superior Masculino – with Plataneros de Corozal
