= Serviço Social da Indústria-SP (men's volleyball) =

Brazilian men's volleyball team

SESI São Paulo
- Full name: Serviço Social da Indústria São Paulo
- Short name: SESI
- Founded: 2009
- Ground: Ginásio Marcello de Castro Leite, São Paulo
- Chairman: Paulo Skaf
- League: Brazilian Superliga
- 2018–19: 2nd
- Website: Club home page

Uniforms
Home	Away

SESI São Paulo, a.k.a. SESI-SP, is a Brazilian professional volleyball team based in Bauru, Brazil. They compete in the Brazilian Superliga and were the 2010–11 national league champions and 2011 South American champions.

== Team ==
Team roster – season 2019/2020

No.	Name	Date of birth	Position
1	(Brazil) Alan Souza	March 21, 1994 (age 32)	opposite
2	(Brazil) Matheus Goncalves	April 1, 1997 (age 29)	setter
3	(Brazil) Alan Maciel	May 15, 2000 (age 26)	outside hitter
4	(Brazil) Victor Cardoso	March 22, 1999 (age 27)	outside hitter
5	(Brazil) Lucas Loh	January 18, 1991 (age 35)	outside hitter
7	(Brazil) William Arjona (c)	July 31, 1979 (age 46)	setter
8	(Brazil) Murilo Endres	May 3, 1981 (age 45)	libero
9	(Brazil) Sidnei Santos	March 21, 1994 (age 32)	middle blocker
10	(Brazil) Daniel Pinho	June 5, 1998 (age 28)	opposite
11	(Brazil) Alan Patrick Araújo	January 3, 1995 (age 31)	outside hitter
13	(Brazil) Lucas Barreto	June 24, 1997 (age 28)	middle blocker
14	(Brazil) Gustavo de Brito	March 22, 1999 (age 27)	middle blocker
15	(Brazil) Douglas Pureza	November 16, 1996 (age 29)	libero
16	(Brazil) Eder Carbonera	October 19, 1983 (age 42)	middle blocker
17	(Brazil) Eric Endres	March 3, 2000 (age 26)	outside hitter
19	(Brazil) Paulo Carraro	August 26, 1999 (age 26)	middle blocker
20	(Brazil) Fábio Rodrigues	July 26, 1995 (age 30)	outside hitter

Team roster - season 2018/2019
SESI São Paulo
No.	Name	Date of birth	Position
1	(Brazil) Alan Souza	March 21, 1994 (age 32)	opposite
2	(Brazil) Evandro Batista	August 22, 1981 (age 44)	setter
3	(Brazil) Alan Maciel	May 15, 2000 (age 26)	outside hitter
4	(Brazil) Lucas Bermudez	January 9, 1999 (age 27)	setter
5	(Brazil) Lucas Loh	January 18, 1991 (age 35)	outside hitter
6	(Brazil) Alan Patrick Araújo	January 3, 1995 (age 31)	outside hitter
7	(Brazil) William Arjona (c)	July 31, 1979 (age 46)	setter
8	(Brazil) Murilo Endres	May 3, 1981 (age 45)	libero
9	(Brazil) Renato dos Santos	January 5, 1983 (age 43)	outside hitter
11	(Brazil) Gabriel Bertolini	August 20, 1997 (age 28)	middle blocker
12	(Brazil) Luiz Felipe Fonteles	June 19, 1984 (age 41)	outside hitter
13	(Brazil) Lucas Barreto	June 24, 1997 (age 28)	middle blocker
14	(Brazil) Gustavo de Brito	March 22, 1999 (age 27)	middle blocker
15	(Brazil) Douglas Pureza	November 16, 1996 (age 29)	libero
16	(Brazil) Eder Carbonera	October 19, 1983 (age 42)	middle blocker
17	(Brazil) Gustavo Bonatto	January 2, 1986 (age 40)	middle blocker
18	(Brazil) Franco Paese	March 1, 1990 (age 36)	opposite
19	(Brazil) Gustavo Siqueira	October 6, 1999 (age 26)	outside hitter
20	(Brazil) Felipe Cundiev	February 26, 1999 (age 27)	libero

Team roster - season 2017/2018
SESI São Paulo
No.	Name	Date of birth	Position
1	(Brazil) Alan Souza	March 21, 1994 (age 32)	opposite
2	(Brazil) Evandro Batista	August 22, 1981 (age 44)	setter
4	(Brazil) Bernardo Westermann	March 13, 1998 (age 28)	setter
5	(Brazil) Leandro dos Santos	January 13, 1993 (age 33)	middle blocker
7	(Brazil) William Arjona	July 31, 1979 (age 46)	setter
8	(Brazil) Murilo Endres (C)	May 3, 1981 (age 45)	outside hitter
9	(Brazil) Renato dos Santos	January 5, 1983 (age 43)	outside hitter
11	(Brazil) Gabriel Bertolini	August 20, 1997 (age 28)	middle blocker
12	(Brazil) Luiz Felipe Fonteles	June 19, 1984 (age 41)	outside hitter
13	(Brazil) Gabriel Vaccari	December 25, 1996 (age 29)	outside hitter
14	(Brazil) Douglas Souza	August 20, 1995 (age 30)	outside hitter
15	(Brazil) Douglas Pureza	November 16, 1996 (age 29)	libero
16	(Brazil) Lucas Saatkamp	March 6, 1986 (age 40)	middle blocker
17	(Brazil) Gustavo Bonatto	January 2, 1986 (age 40)	middle blocker
18	(Brazil) Franco Paese	March 1, 1990 (age 36)	opposite
20	(Brazil) Silmar de Almeida	October 6, 1986 (age 39)	outside hitter
Head coach: Roberley Leonaldo; Assistant: Giuliano Rubas

Team roster - season 2016/2017
SESI São Paulo
No.	Name	Date of birth	Position
1	(Brazil) Bruno Rezende	July 2, 1986 (age 39)	setter
2	(Brazil) Rodrigo Leitzke	January 3, 1998 (age 28)	middle blocker
3	(Brazil) Rafael Martins de Almeida	May 6, 1976 (age 50)	setter
4	(Brazil) Bernardo Westermann	March 13, 1998 (age 28)	setter
5	(Brazil) Leandro dos Santos	January 13, 1993 (age 33)	middle blocker
6	(Brazil) Alan Patrick Araujo	January 3, 1995 (age 31)	opposite
7	(Brazil) Théo Lopes	August 13, 1983 (age 42)	opposite
8	(Brazil) Murilo Endres (C)	May 3, 1981 (age 45)	outside hitter
9	(Brazil) Sidão	July 9, 1982 (age 43)	middle blocker
10	(Brazil) Sérgio Santos	October 15, 1975 (age 50)	libero
12	(Brazil) Douglas Souza	August 20, 1995 (age 30)	outside hitter
13	(Brazil) Gabriel Vaccari	December 25, 1996 (age 29)	outside hitter
14	(Brazil) Johan Marengoni	January 10, 1995 (age 31)	middle blocker
15	(Brazil) Douglas Pureza	November 16, 1996 (age 29)	libero
16	(Brazil) Lucas Saatkamp	March 6, 1986 (age 40)	middle blocker
20	(Brazil) Fábio Rodrigues	July 26, 1995 (age 30)	outside hitter
Head coach: Marcos Pacheco; Assistant: Gerson Amorin

== Honors ==
- Brazilian Superliga
  (x2) 2010–11, 2023-24
  (x4) 2013–14, 2014–15, 2017–18, 2018–19
- Brazilian Super Cup
  (x1) 2018
- Paulista Championship
  (x4) 2009, 2011, 2012, 2013
- South American Championship
  (x1) 2011

== See also ==
- Serviço Social da Indústria-SP (women's volleyball) - Women's team
