= José Luís Purcell Rodríguez =

Puerto Rican judge and athletic booster

José Luís "Wiso" Purcell Rodríguez, (December 1, 1914, Bayamón, Puerto Rico – February 6, 1996, San Juan, Puerto Rico) A former judge in the Superior Court of Puerto Rico, founded the Puerto Rico Volleyball Federation.

He was one of the founders and first president of the Puerto Rican Volleyball Federation. He was president of the Volleyball Federation from 1958 to 1962. He was a member of the 1966 Central American and Caribbean Games organizing committee. He was a member and president of Phi Sigma Alpha fraternity.

== Legacy ==
In 1986 he was inducted to the "Directorio Inmortale" of the Puerto Rican Sports Hall of Fame.
