= 2011 FIVB Volleyball World League qualification =

The 2011 FIVB Volleyball World League qualification was a qualification tournament to determine the final two spots for the 2011 World League. It was held from 6 to 29 August 2010.

== Teams ==
Team	Qualified as
Second Round
China	15th place of the 2010 FIVB Volleyball World League
South Korea	16th place of the 2010 FIVB Volleyball World League
First Round
Tunisia	African Challenger (No. 22 in the World Ranking)
Japan	Asian Challenger (No. 11 in the World Ranking)
Puerto Rico	American Challenger (No. 15 in the World Ranking)
Portugal	European Challenger (No. 42 in the World Ranking)

== Pool standing procedure ==
1. Match points
2. Number of matches won
3. Points ratio
4. Sets ratio
5. Result of the last match between the tied teams

Match won 3–0 or 3–1: 3 match points for the winner, 0 match points for the loser
Match won 3–2: 2 match points for the winner, 1 match point for the loser

== First round ==
- All times are local.

=== Leg 1 ===
Pos	Team	Pld	W	L	Pts	SPW	SPL	SPR	SW	SL	SR
1	Puerto Rico	2	2	0	6	190	167	1.138	6	2	3.000
2	Portugal	2	0	2	0	167	190	0.879	2	6	0.333

Date	Time		Score		Set 1	Set 2	Set 3	Set 4	Set 5	Total	Report
06 Aug	20:10	Puerto Rico	3–1	Portugal	20–25	25–18	25–22	25–22		95–87	P2 P3
07 Aug	20:10	Puerto Rico	3–1	Portugal	20–25	25–15	25–18	25–22		95–80	P2 P3

=== Leg 2 ===
Pos	Team	Pld	W	L	Pts	SPW	SPL	SPR	SW	SL	SR
1	Japan	2	2	0	6	150	108	1.389	6	0	MAX
2	Tunisia	2	0	2	0	108	150	0.720	0	6	0.000

Date	Time		Score		Set 1	Set 2	Set 3	Set 4	Set 5	Total	Report
17 Aug	18:07	Japan	3–0	Tunisia	25–20	25–13	25–21			75–54	P2 P3
18 Aug	18:07	Japan	3–0	Tunisia	25–17	25–16	25–21			75–54	P2 P3

== Second round ==
- All times are local.

=== Leg 1 ===
Pos	Team	Pld	W	L	Pts	SPW	SPL	SPR	SW	SL	SR
1	South Korea	2	2	0	6	198	187	1.059	6	2	3.000
2	Japan	2	0	2	0	187	198	0.944	2	6	0.333

Date	Time		Score		Set 1	Set 2	Set 3	Set 4	Set 5	Total	Report
24 Aug	18:07	Japan	1–3	South Korea	20–25	25–20	27–29	21–25		93–99	P2 P3
25 Aug	18:07	Japan	1–3	South Korea	25–23	23–25	24–26	22–25		94–99	P2 P3

=== Leg 2 ===
Pos	Team	Pld	W	L	Pts	SPW	SPL	SPR	SW	SL	SR
1	Puerto Rico	2	2	0	6	199	182	1.093	6	2	3.000
2	China	2	0	2	0	182	199	0.915	2	6	0.333

Date	Time		Score		Set 1	Set 2	Set 3	Set 4	Set 5	Total	Report
28 Aug	20:10	Puerto Rico	3–1	China	22–25	25–21	25–21	25–23		97–90	P2 P3
29 Aug	20:10	Puerto Rico	3–1	China	25–19	30–28	22–25	25–20		102–92	P2 P3
