= Enrique Escalante =

Puerto Rican volleyball player (born 1984)

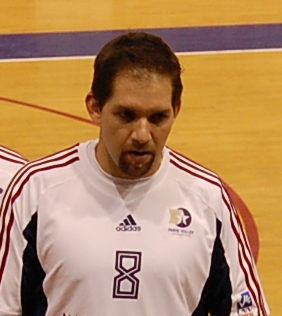

Personal information
- Born: August 6, 1984 (age 41)
Medal record
Men's volleyball
Representing Puerto Rico
NORCECA Championship
Silver medal – second place	2007 Anaheim	Team
Pan-American Cup
Silver medal – second place	2007 Santo Domingo	Team
Bronze medal – third place	2010 San Juan	Team

Enrique Escalante (born August 6, 1984) is a volleyball player from Puerto Rico, who was a member of the Men's National Team that ended up in sixth place at the 2007 FIVB Men's World Cup in Japan. In the same year the middle-blocker won the silver medal at the NORCECA Championship in Anaheim. He won with his team the bronze medal at the 2010 Pan-American Cup.

== Clubs ==
- (Puerto Rico) Plataneros de Corozal (2006–2010)
- (Puerto Rico) Patriotas de Lares (2010–2014)
- (Puerto Rico) Mets de Guaynabo (2015-2022)
- (Puerto Rico) Changos de Naranjito (2022–Present)
