= Sean Morrison (beach volleyball) =

Trinidad and Tobago beach volleyball player

Personal information
- Full name: Sean Miguel Morrison
- Nickname: Sean
- Nationality: Trinidad and Tobago
- Born: October 4, 1983 (age 43) San Fernando, Trinidad and Tobago
- Home town: San Fernando, Trinidad and Tobago
- Height: 193 cm (6 ft 4 in)
- Weight: 77 kg (170 lb)
Beach volleyball information
Years	Teammate	Tours (points)
–	2003; 2007	Nolan Tash; Christian Francois; Mark Daly

Sean Miguel Morrison (born October 4, 1983 in San Fernando) is a male beach volleyball and volleyball player from Trinidad and Tobago. He played in the men's competition at the NORCECA Beach Volleyball Circuit 2007 in Guatemala City, partnering with Christian Francois and finishing in 12th place.

Partnering Nolan Tash, he played in the 2003 Pan American Games beach volleyball competitions, finishing in 13th position.

In Indoor volleyball, he participated in the Pan-American Cup 2006 and 2008 with his National team.

== Clubs ==
- (Trinidad and Tobago) Rockets (1998–2000)
- (Trinidad and Tobago) Glamorgans (2000–2007)
- (Trinidad and Tobago) Technocrats(2000–present)

== Awards ==
=== Beach & Indoor ===
- Trinidad and Tobago Beach Volleyball Championship 2003, 2006, 2007, Gold Medal
- player of the year 2001 and 2004
- won a total of 10 National Championships with Glamorgan & Technocrats, won MVP, best spiker, best blocker, best receiver each year.
- Won 3 consecutive pro league with Technocrats
- Coached at 2014 Youth Olympics China
