= Gustavo Bonatto =

Brazilian volleyball player (born 1986)

Gustavo Guazzelli Bonatto

Personal information
- Nationality: Brazilian
- Born: 2 January 1986 (age 40)
- Height: 215 cm (7 ft 1 in)
- Weight: 113 kg (249 lb)
- Spike: 340 cm (134 in)
- Block: 320 cm (126 in)

Volleyball information
- Current club: Olympiacos Piraeus
- Number: 8

Career
Years	Teams
2003–2007; 2007–2009; 2009–2010; 2010–2015; 2015–2016; 2016–2017; 2017–2019; 2019–2020; 2020–2021; 2021–2022; 2002–Jan. 2023; Jan. 2023–2024	(Brazil) UCS Sogipa (Brazil) Unisul (Brazil) SESI São Paulo (Brazil) Renata (Brazil) SESI São Paulo (Argentina) UPCN (Brazil) SESI São Paulo (Brazil) Sesc Rio (Brazil) Minas (Belgium) Greenyard VC Maaseik (Brazil) Joinvile Volei (Greece) Olympiacos Piraeus

National team
2010–2014	Brazil
Honours
Men's volleyball
Representing Brazil
America's Cup
Silver medal – second place	2008 Cuiabá
World University Games
Bronze medal – third place	2011 Shenzhen
FIVB World League
Silver medal – second place	2014 Florence

Gustavo Guazzelli Bonatto, also known as Gustavão, (born 2 January 1986) is a Brazilian male volleyball player. He was part of the Brazil men's national volleyball team from 2010 to 2014, with whom he won a silver medal in the 2014 FIVB Volleyball World League. On club level, he currently plays for Greek powerhouse Olympiacos Piraeus, being an integral part of the Olympiacos team that won the 2022–23 CEV Challenge Cup.

== Career ==
=== National team ===
Gustavo Bonato had a remarkable career with the Brazil national volleyball team. In 2008 he participated with the representative group in the last ever edition of the America's Cup, in which he won the Silver medal. In the 2010 Pan-American Cup edition, in which Brazil took the 4th place, he was named best blocker. He was a key member of the Brazilian National Team at the 2011 Summer Universiade in Shenzhen, China, in which the "cariocas" won the Bronze medal. He was also a key player in Brazil's 4th place finish at the 2012 Pan-American Cup. However, his greatest success with his country's national team was the silver medal in the 2014 World League, where he recorded his last appearance with the Brazilian National Team in a major competition.

== Honours ==
=== National team ===
- 2008 America's Cup
- 2011 2011 Summer Universiade
- 2014 FIVB World League

=== Clubs ===
- CEV Challenge Cup
  - 2022/2023 – with Olympiacos Piraeus
- South American Championship
  - 2016 – with UPCN
- National Championships
  - 2003/2004 Liga Nacional with UCS Sogipa
  - 2007/2008 Catarinense Championship with Unisul
  - 2009/2010 Paulista Championship with SESI São Paulo
  - 2016/2017 Argentine Super Cup with UPCN
  - 2018/2019 Brazilian Super Cup with SESI São Paulo
  - 2019/2020 Carioca Championship with Sesc Rio
  - 2022/2023 Greek Championship, with Olympiacos Piraeus
  - 2023/2024 Hellenic Cup: 2024 with Olympiacos Piraeus
  - 2023/2024 Greek Championship, with Olympiacos Piraeus

=== Individually ===
- 2009 Brazilian Championship – Best Blocker
- 2010 Pan-American Cup – Best Blocker
- 2012 Brazilian Championship – Best Blocker
- 2014 Brazilian Championship – Best Blocker
- 2017 Argentine Championship – Best Middle Blocker
- 2022 CEV Champions League – Best Middle Blocker
