= Plataneros de Corozal =

Puerto Rican male volleyball team

- Founded: 1970
- Ground: Carmen Zoraida Figueroa, Corozal, Puerto Rico (Capacity: 5,000)
- Chairman: (Puerto Rico) Javier Diaz
- Manager: (Puerto Rico) Francisco Díaz
- League: Liga de Voleibol Superior Masculino

Plataneros de Corozal is a professional volleyball team based in Corozal, Puerto Rico. They play in the Puerto Rican Liga de Voleibol Superior Masculino (LVSM), where they are the second team with most championships with nine, only trailing the world-record holders Changos de Naranjito (24). The success achieved by the Plataneros and their counterpart, the Pinkin de Corozal of the Liga de Voleibol Superior Femenino (LVSF), during the 1970s and 1980s earned the municipality the nickname of "La Capital del Voleibol" (lit. "The Capital of Volleyball").

== History ==
=== Early years ===
The team's name was based on a nickname for the municipality, "El Pueblo de los Plataneros", which makes reference to its historic agricultural economy and in particular to its widespread plantain crops. The Plataneros began their participation by forming a roster comprised by players developed locally at Corozal, with their first team taking several seasons to acquire experience while playing in the youth leagues. They were owned by Manuel Nevárez Díaz and coached by Abraham Ramírez. These included a core of players including Julio Figueroa, Tomás Martínez, Aníbal Rivera, Jesús Rivera, Patricio Morales, Rubén Martínez, Vitín Morales, Tomás Colón, Alex Díaz, Jimmy Morales, Jesús Sánchez, Tito Rodríguez, José L. Ojeda, Iván Santiago, Jesús Sierra, William Domínguez and Julio Rivera.

By 1975, the Plataneros were competing against Primera División teams. Corozal's first participation in a quarterfinals took place in 1976, when they defeated the Changos de Naranjito in three games. In the semifinals, the Plataneros defeated the Cafeteros de Yauco in four games. The Mets de Guaynabo defeated Corozal in five games, with the decisive one being held at a neutral court in Caguas. The Plataneros began the 1976–77 season in a winning streak, reaching the finals for the second consecutive season. Once again paired against Guaynabo, this time Corozal won a decisive sixth game before a sold-out crowd at home to earn their first league championship. Now owned by Víctor Vázquez and coached by Agustin Flores, they advanced to the finals again in 1978–79, being paired with the Changos de Naranjito in what became known as La Serie de la Montaña, due to both teams hailing from neighboring municipalities. The Plataneros won the series in six games as part of a series that sold well.

Following the acquisition of the franchise by Jesús Rivera and the contracting of Francisco Ochoa as coach, the Plataneros began the 1979 season on a 7-0 winning streak that placed them on top of the overall rankings and the leadership of Section A. Corozal received the visit of the runner-up Changos before a sold-out crowd, defeating them en route to extend their streak to 16–0. Both teams faced off in a rematch a month later, with the Changos now boasting a record of 13-2 while Corozal who continued undefeated, won this game as well. The Plataneros defeated the Cafeteros de Yauco in three sets (15–9, 15-13 and 15–11) to tie the league's record for most consecutive wins with 21. However, the team's bid to break the mark concluded when the Patriotas de Lares defeated them in five sets (11–15, 15–10, 15–13, 15-12 and 15–7).

Still on top of both the league and their section, the Plataneros recovered by defeating Bayamón in three sets (15–10, 15-10 and 15–13) and finished the regular season with a record of 26–1. Corozal interrupted the season to play an exhibition series against the pre-selection of the Puerto Rico women's national team. Advancing to the final series, the Plataneros won the first over the Changos in four sets (15–9, 15–9, 6-15 and 15–4). In a decisive fifth game, Corozal defeated Naranjito in four sets (17–5, 10–15, 15-10 and 15–12). This win tied them with Yauco and Ponce as the teams with most league titles.

=== Perennial champions ===
The Plataneros opened the 1980 season on another winning streak, gathering eleven consecutive victories. Like the previous season, their first loss came in three sets (15–7, 15-12 and 15–13) against the Patriotas. Corozal opened their postseason participation with a three win loss to the Caciques de Jayuya. The Plataneros responded by winning the second game in three sets and clinched the series with a four-set win. Corozal defeated Ponce in three (15–9, 15-10 and 15–6) and four sets (15–2, 14–16, 15-6 and 15–9) to take a lead in the semifinals. Despite sweeping the Leones, Lares was favored to win the title and there were concerns that the team was aging. The Plataneros opened the final by winning the first two games over the Patriotas. Corozal defeated Lares in four sets (6–15, 15–11, 15-12 and 15–10) to win their fourth straight championship, a league record at the moment. The Plataneros were recognized as the "Team of the Decade".

Coached by Paco Ochoa the Plataneros opened the 1981 season by receiving the visit of the Guayacanes de Guayanilla, defeating them in three sets (15–1, 15-11 and 15–6), starting another extended undefeated streak defeating Trujillo Alto (15–5, 15–13, 13-15 and 15–5) to climb to the top of the rankings. After improving their record to 5–0, Corozal defeated the Patriotas who entered the game as the other undefeated team in the league, in five sets. The Plataneros defeated the Bucaneros de Arroyo (15–10, 15–7, 9-15 and 15–12) and Caguas (10–15, 15–8, 15-4 and 15–6) to widen their lead. The Plataneros defeated Yauco to reach eleven consecutive games. The continued this streak by defeating Ponce in five sets (15–11, 15–13, 8–15, 10-15 and 15–0) for their 15th victory. Led by Víctor Morales with 11 points, the Plataneros defeated the Patriotas in four sets (15–11, 15–3, 14-16 and 15–12) to clinch the first place on the standings.

By defeating Arroyo, Caguas and Naranjito, Corozal won its 20th game, marking its 30th consecutive victory including the previous season. The team closed the season by defeating the Cafeteros (11–15, 15–8, 15–5, 13-15 and 15–6) and Leones (15–12, 15-3 and 15–3) to finish a perfect season and establish a new league record. Corozal was paired against the Criollos in the quarterfinals, opening with a three-set win (15–2, 15-2 and 15–7), repeating the performance in the second (15–13, 15-11 and 15–12) and third (15–10, 15-9 and 15–10) games to sweep the series. In the semifinals, the team defeated the Cafeteros de Yauco in three sets (15–10, 15-5 and 15–6), the second in four sets and won the third to advance. The Patriotas snapped the winning streak by winning in four sets (15–4, 6–15, 10-15 and 15–8). Corozal responded by tying the series in three sets (15–13, 15-9 and 15–9) and took the lead in four sets (18–16, 15–12, 15-8 and 15–2). Lares defended their home court in five sets (6–15, 15–11, 15–13, 11-15 and 15–13) to tie the series. Corozal retook the series lead with five set (15–2, 15–7, 9-15 and 15–9) win, but Lares tied the series again (4–15, 15–13, 16–14, 9-15 and 15–6) at Coliseo Pancho Gelpí in Arecibo. The Patriotas won the decisive game held at Coliseo Pachín Vicens at Ponce in five sets (15–12, 8–15, 15–12, 6-15 and 15–7).

Julio Figueroa acquired the franchise, serving as both owner and player, with Alex Díaz as coach. Corozal opened the 1982 season on a five-game winning streak, defeating the Cafeteros in four sets (14–16, 15–8, 16-14 and 16–14) to place second behind the 8-0 Patriotas. The Plataneros suffered a single loss in their next ten games, raising their record to 14–1 with a three set victory over Trujillo Alto. Prior to defeating Arroyo in four sets (15–8, 15–8, 8-15 and 15–3), Díaz presented his resignation as coach due to personal reasons. Figueroa approached Raful Rodríguez and Manuel Torres as possible replacements, with the former being favored. After advancing to the quarterfinals, Corozal defeated the Leñeros de Lares in four sets (16–18, 15–7, 15-10 and 15–9) to open the series. The Plataneros advanced to the semifinals and were paired with the Cafeteros. The team won a decisive game in four sets (15–8, 3–15, 15-10 and 15–12).

The Plataneros opened the finals with a three set (15–10, 15-10 and 15–8) loss, but responded by defeating the Patriotas in thee sets (16–14, 15-5 and 15–4) snapping their opponent's 35-game winning streak. The team won the next two games to gain a 3-1 advance over the Patriotas, who were widely regarded as the favorites to repeat the title. The Plataneros won their fourth straight game in three sets to secure the series and the title. During the offseason, the franchise was acquired by José R. Marrero and Jesús Rivera was named coach. The team's roster retained veterans Julio Figueroa, Tomás Martínez, Aníbal Rivera, Víctor Morales, Jorge González and Patricio Morales, but also included youth players Coabita Colón, Rafael Rivera and Ángel Rodríguez and international player Eduardo Cole. Julio Figueroa was selected Best Offensive Player and Tomás Martínez the Most Valuable Player.

Now owned by José Marrero, entering the season as the favorites to repeat the title and coached by Jesús Rivera, Corozal opened the 1983 season with a three set (15–5, 15-12 and 15–5) win over Caguas, also receiving their championship trophy from league president Germán Vázquez. The team entered another winning streak, gathering a record of 8-0 and the fanbase responded with their support. The Patriotas were able to defeat the Plataneros at home. However, Corozal won a rematch in three sets (15–8, 15-9 and 15–11) at Lares. Led by Tomás Martinez with 13 points, the Plataneros then defeated the Gigantes de Adjuntas in three sets (15–8, 15-7 and 15–9) prior to the All-Star Game, which they also hosted. Tomás Martínez and Caobita Colón were selected to play for Sección Metropolitana, while Jesús Rivera coached the section's team. Finishing on top of the rankings, Corozal began the offseason by dominating Serie D and advancing. However, prior to the final Marrero and Patriotas owner Ricardo Méndez Bryan threatened to boycott the final due to economic differences over television rights, forcing Tournament Director Amaury Rodríguez to postpone the beginning and prompting League President Vázquez to warn them that they would both be suspended for 1–3 years if the behavior continued. However, the delay allowed the Patriotas to recover spiker Rigoberto Guilloty, who was sick and scheduled to lose several games before the development. Once the matter was settled, Lares took a two-game lead over Corozal, winning both in five sets en route to a series win.

=== Perfect regular season record ===
The Plataneros opened the 1984 season with a record of 10-1 and after defeating the Leones in four sets (12–15, 15–6, 15-9 and 15–9) led by 14 points by Tomás Martínez, they approached the top-ranked Patriotas (12–1). With 15 points by Julio Figueroa the team secured a win over Trujillo Alto in five sets (7–15, 15–7, 15–7, 13-15 and 15–11), capturing the first place. Advancing to the post season without losing a single home game, the Plataneros defeated the Delfines in three sets (15–7, 15-6 and 15–12) to open the quarterfinal. Corozal won the second game in three sets (15–10, 15-6 and 15–9) and won a decisive game to advance. The Plataneros defeated the Guayacanes in three sets (15–4, 15-7 and 15–6) to begin the semifinal. The team won the second game in three sets (15–6, 15-8 and 15–10) and a decisive match (15–12, 15-13 and 15–11) to advance. Corozal won the first game of the series in five sets (16–14, 15–11, 7–15, 8-15 and 15–7) and the second in four sets (15–5, 15–6, 13-15 and 15–5). The Plataneros defeated the Changos in five sets (15–12, 11–15, 15–17, 15-2 and 17–15) before a sold-out crowd at Naranjito to win their sixth championship.

Corozal opened the 1985 season with wins over Yauco, Lares, Trujillo Alto and Caguas, only losing a set against the latter, to gather a record of 8-0 that led Section B and the league. The team lost its first game against Naranjito in five sets, but recovered with two wins. The team still faced some difficulties in games that they won, including a five set (16–14, 12–15, 6–15, 15-9 and 15–10) win over Guayanilla, and suffered a second loss to place their record at 15–2. Despite this, the Plataneros remained in the second place and on top of their section. Still relying on the offensive of Julio Figueroa, Corozal defeated San Juan in three sets and Ensenada in five sets, but their performance was considered subpar by owner Jorge Rosado who fired coach Ernesto Vázquez. Jesús Rivera was contracted as the new coach. The Plataneros defeated the Caribes de San Sebastián in four sets (15–7, 15–5, 5-15 and 15–1) to remain alone in the second place of the league. Corozal increased their record to 19–2, before losing a second game to Naranjito in five sets (10–15, 14–16, 15–13, 15-10 and 5–15). Corozal recovered with wins in three-sets (15–11, 15-8 and 15–3) over Mayagüez and four-sets (15–2, 11–15, 15-9 and 15–9) over Guaynabo. The Plataneros lost twice in their next games, placing their record at 24–4 to close the regular season.

In the semifinals, San Sebastián defeated them in four sets. The Plataneros responded with wins in four sets (14–16, 15–13, 15-12 and 15–12), three sets (15–3, 15-12 and 15–11) and four sets (15–9, 15–5, 9-15 and 15–4) to take the lead. Corozal eliminated San Sebastián (15–3, 17-15 and 15–12) to defend their title. Corozal lost César Muñiz prior to the final and the Changos won the first game of the series in three sets. The Plataneros tied the series (15–11, 12–15, 15–11, 14-16 and 15–12) and took a lead (15–2, 3–15, 15–8, 14-16 and 15–10) by winning consecutive five set games. The Changos responded by winning the fourth and fifth games in three sets and five sets . Facing elimination, Corozal won in five sets (15–8, 9–15, 8–15, 15-10 and 5–15) to tie the series before a sold-out crowd at the home court. The decisive game was held at the Mets Pavilion at Guaynabo, with the Changos winning in three sets (15–13, 15-12 and 15–6), in the process matching the Plataneros for most league titles won. Julio Figueroa was named the Best Settler for the year.

=== Juan Rosado and coach instability ===
During the offseason, Julio Figueroa considered an offer from an unidentified team, before opting to remain at Corozal. However, Jaime Isern of Guyanabo and Abraham Rivera of Naranjito approached Juan L. Coabita Colón and gave him money up front. The player ultimately signed two contracts, one with the Plataneros and another with the Mets. Rosado granted him a release and agreed to pay the sums back, but the situation was eventually brought before the league at a hearing where the player was suspended for a year. Unsatisfied, the team owner pursued legal action and threatened the league with an injunction to delay the start of the tournament. The Volleyball Federation responded that his only way to appeal the suspension was before the Board of Directors, due to it being based on a violation of the league's rule book. Meanwhile, Jesús Rivera returned as coach and René Silva and Modesto González were added to the roster. The appeal filed by Rosado fell though, despite Colón intent to return with the team, and the one-year suspension was upheld.

The Plataneros opened the 1986 season, which was dedicated to one of their fans Isidro Febus, by defeating Yauco in three sets (15–4, 15-3 and 15–7). The team scored a four-set win (13–15, 15–5, 15-2 and 15–8) over the Leñeros de Lares before losing their first match of the season to the Changos (15–8, 11–15, 7–15, 15-5 and 15–9). Corozal continued having difficulties and despite defeating Trujillo Alto in five sets (15–6, 13–15, 11–15, 15-11 and 15–6), lost two consecutive games to Guayanilla and San Sebastián. The Plataneros incorporated Alex Torres to the roster and defeated the Mets in five sets (15–6, 13–15, 15–11, 11-15 and 15–6). Despite their performance, the team led Section A in points scored during the early season with 411. Corozal then entered a winning streak defeating the Caribes in four sets (15–13, 15–5, 11-15 and 17–15), the Leñeros in three sets (15–11, 15-8 and 15–6) and the Delfines in four sets (15–9, 11–15, 15-7 and 15–7). Naranjito stopped it by defeating Corozal in five sets (12–5, 10–15, 15–12, 15-11 and 15–10). The Plataneros recovered with a win over the Cafeteros in four sets (15–5, 11–15, 15-13 and 15–7), but then lost to the Guayacanes in five sets (16–14, 9–15, 15–10, 12-15 and 15–5).

The team defeated Lares in three sets (15–6, 15-11 and 15–9), San Sebastián in four sets (15–6, 6–15, 15-5 and 15–7), Trujillo Alto in three sets (15–8, 15-12 and 15–8) and Guaynabo in five sets (10–15, 15–5, 12–15, 15-9 and 15–8). During the final stage of the tournament, Rosado announced that he would not return as franchise owner. The Plataneros then defeated the Changos in four sets (15–8, 15–13, 5-15 and 15–12) to give them their first loss in twenty games. The team's winning streak continued over Lares (15–6, 16-14 and 15–12), but was stopped by the Mets (13–15, 15–8, 7–15, 15-12 and 12–15). The team lost a rematch against the Changos in three sets (15–5, 15-5 and 15–11). The Plataneros defeated the Cafeteros (15–3, 15-10 and 15–5), the Caribes (15–13, 15-13 and 15–9), Guayanilla (15–7, 19-17 and 15–7) and Trujillo Alto (15–10, 15-3 and 15–12). The team defeated Guayanilla in four sets (15–10, 9–15, 15-4 and 15–3) to clinch the second place of Section A. In the quarterfinals, the Plataneros defeated Ensenada in three sets (15–6, 18-16 and 15–12) and four sets (15–5, 13–5, 15-10 and 15–11).

During the offseason, the team contracted Manuel Torres as coach and players Víctor Aponte, Fernando de Armas, Sammy Rivera Céspedes and Edgar Ríos. Corozal opened the 1988 season by defeating Caguas in five sets (9–15, 15–6, 15–9, 15-17 and 15–8). The team won its next matches over the Patateros (15–6, 11–15, 15-7 and 15–9), the Joscos de Toa Alta (15–8, 15–3, 2-15 and 15–3) and the Caribes (16–14, 15-11 and 15–12). Corozal suffered its first loss of the season to Naranjito in five sets (15–8, 15–11, 5–15, 6-15 and 17–15) and their second in a rematch with Sábana Grande (15–4, 15–13, 11–15, 12-15 and 13–15). They recovered with wins over San Sebastián (15–13, 14–16, 15-9 and 15–13), Toa Alta (16–14, 15-10 and 16–14) and Caguas (15–9, 12–15, 15-8 and 15–12).

The Plataneros won rematches against the Caribes in four sets (15–13, 5–15, 15-9 and 15–5), the Joscos in three sets (15–0, 15-7 and 25–13) and the Changos in four sets (12–15, 15–4, 15-12 and 15–7). The team then defeated the Vampiros de Moca twice (15–9, 15-0 and 15–6; 6–15, 15–12, 15-13 and 16–14) and the Petateros (15–6, 15-5 and 15–12). Jesús Rivera returned as coach, while Torres left to coach the Caribes, but his use of the players caused some tension. By defeating Naranjito in five sets (16–14, 6–15, 6–15, 15-13 and 15–12), both teams shared the top spot of Section A. The Plataneros took a brief detour from the LVS to face Rutgers University’s Scarlet Knights men's team in an exhibition.

Prior to the All-Star Game, Naranjito was able to climb to the first place due to having more victories overall. The Plataneros took a brief detour from the LVS to face Rutgers University’s Scarlet Knights men's team in an exhibition. Resuming the season, Corozal defeated Toa Alta in three sets (15–8, 15-11 and 15–4), Caguas in four sets (15–9, 9–15, 15-8 and 15–7) and San Sebastián (15–10, 11–15, 10-15 and 15–13) to reach 20 victories for the season. The Plataneros lost to the Changos (17–15, 10–15, 11–15, 15-10 and 15–4) in a bid for the first place. Corozal recovered with wins over Moca in four sets (15–6, 16–14, 12-15 and 15–9) and Sábana Grande in three sets (15–8, 15-7 and 15–12). One final bid for the top spot favored the Changos in three sets (15–3, 15-5 and 15–13), leading to Rivera resigning as coach. Rosado contracted Humberto Rodríguez to coach the team. The Plataneros closed the season by defeating the Joscos in four sets (15–10, 15–11, 7-15 and 15–11) and losing to the Vampiros in three sets (15–3, 15-4 and 20–18) and Caribes in five sets (6–15, 16-14 and 16–14).

After receiving a quarter final bye, Corozal defeated San Sebastián in three sets (15–11, 15-11 and 15–3) to open the semifinal. The team won the second (15–12, 12–15, 12–15, 15-3 and 15–8) and third games (14–16, 8–15, 15–12, 15-11 and 15–6), both in five sets. The Caribes won their first game in four sets (15–9, 15–12, 16-18 and 15–8) to stay alive and the next two to tie the series. In a decisive game, Corozal was eliminated by San Sebastián in five sets (15–11, 4–15, 15–11, 12-15 and 15–9). The Changos ultimately won their first game championship and broke the tie for most titles that it held along Corozal. Julio Figueroa was selected Best Settler and Jorge Colón Best Defense.

During the offseason, Rosado contacted Humberto Rodríguez to work as coach but he declined and Rafael Olazagasti, Roberto Rivera and Francisco Ochoa were considered instead. In free agency, Tomás Martínez left the for Caguas. Ultimately, Rodríguez signed on as coach prior to the start of the season. The Plataneros and Changos played an exhibition to raise funds for Academia Santo Tomás de Aquino, which was won by Naranjito in four sets (15–2, 15–6, 11-15 and 15–11). While Figueroa, Sammy Rivera, Iván Muñiz, David Donate and Félix Reyes returned and Guillermo Silva, Fernando de Armas, Ángel Peña, Victor Morales and Juan Colón were incorporated to the roster, the Plataneros were not seen as the favorites.

Corozal opened the 1989 season by defeating Lares in three sets (15–5, 15-8 and 15–0). The Plataneros defeated the Leones in three sets (15–12, 15-7 and 15–10) to ascend to the second position. The team's first loss of the season was to Naranjito in three sets (15–11, 15-7 and 15–8), which was followed by consecutive defeats to Caguas (15–13, 3–15, 5–15, 15-13 and 16–14) and San Sebastián (15–6, 16–14, 8-15 and 15–11). Corozal stopped their losing streak at three games by defeating Moca (16–14, 15-13 and 15–11). The Plataneros earned wins over the Patriotas (15–11, 15-13 and 15–11) and the Leones (10–15, 15–9, 15-12 and 15–7), but lost to the Changos (6–15, 1-15 and 11–15) to put their record at .500 for the season. Corozal won rematches against Caguas (15–5, 10–15, 15-9 and 15–8), Moca (15–8, 10–15, 15-12 and 15–13), San Sebastián (15–11, 15–8, 1-15 and 15–8) and Ponce (15–8, 15–8, 16-17 and 15–4) to climb to the third place in the rankings.

The Plataneros continued this streak over the Criollos (15–6, 16-14 and 15–4), but were once again stopped by the Changos (15–11, 10–15, 11-15 and 8–15). They suffered consecutive losses to the Vampiros (13–15, 12-15 and 8–15) and Caribes (12–15, 15–9, 13-15 and 13–15). The team recovered with a win over the Patriotas (11–15, 15–12, 12-15 and 6–15), but lost to the Changos again (14–16, 13–15, 15-8 and 8–15).

The Plataneros earned consecutive wins over the Leones (15–7, 15-9 and 15–12) and the Criollos (15–8, 15-10 and 15–7). The team then lost to the Caribes in three sets (12–15, 9-15 and 7–15) and defeated the Vampiros in five sets (10–15, 16–14, 8–15, 15-10 and 15–13). The team opened the postseason Section A round robin series by losing to Moca in four sets (15–9, 14–15, 12-15 and 9–15).

The arrival of Silva was among the changes made in anticipation of a deep postseason run, but Corozal lost to Naranjito twice (3–15, 9-15 and 13–15; 8–15, 6–15, 16-14 and 12–15) and San Sebastián (7–15, 12–15, 15-11 and 9–15). The Plataneros won its first gme of the round robin over the Vampiros in four sets (15–9, 13–15, 15-6 and 15–8) and followed this with a victory over the Caribes (11–15, 15–11, 15–11, 10-15 and 15–12). By defeating Moca again (15–11, 15–17, 15-9 and 15–12), Corozal tied in the second place of the series.

After suffering losses to San Sebastián (15–22, 13–15, 15–6, 11-15 and 15–17) and Naranjito (15–13, 15–7, 5–15, 9-15 and 13–15) the team faced elimination. Corozal stayed alive with wins over Moca (8–15, 15–12, 15–9, 13-15 and 15–6) and San Sebastián (15–8, 1–15, 15-13 and 15–5), but finished its participation with a loss to Naranjito (12–15, 15–12, 14-16 and 12–15).

=== Figueroa retires, rise of Ramón Hernández ===
During the offseason, Julio Rivera announced that he was considering his retirement, but returned for another year. In October 1989, Rosado stated that Federico López, already an established international basket player who within months would win the Best Point Guard Award at the 1990 FIBA World Cup, was in negotiations to play volleyball with the Plataneros. Iván Muñiz's contract was loaned by the team to the Changos, while Naranjito allowed Enrique López's contract to remain loaned to Corozal. During the preseason, the team participated in El Chango, an exhibition tournament. Ramón Hernández, Tomás Martínez, Osvaldo Batista and Alberto Lanza were added to the roster, with Robert Rivera as coach. Several games where Corozal was supposed to play to open the season were suspended due to Rosado refusing to honor a sponsorship agreement between the league and Food & Spirits corporation due to having its own sponsor for the team's uniforms. The controversy grew to include the president of the Puerto Rico Olympic Committee (COPUR), Germán Rieckehoff, who critiqued it as an example of the money taking precedence over the sport. In response, the volleyball federation named a committee, which led to Foods & Spirits agreeing to pay for the team's uniforms for more money that the other sponsor. Finally debuting, the Plataneros defeated Yauco in three sets (15–13, 15-9 and 15–8).

David Donate did not play due to differences with Rosado and was released. Corozal defeated San Sebastíán in four sets (15–9, 1–15, 15-11 and 15–12) and suffered their first loss to Moca in five sets (15–13, 10–15, 15–7, 10-15 and 16–17). The Plataneros gathered victories over the Criollos (13–15, 15–10, 15–17, 15-5 and 15–11) and the Leones (10–15, 15–6, 11–15, 15-13 and 15–13) to climb to the second position. This winning streak was stopped by the Changos (15–7, 11–15, 15-9 and 15–12) and a loss to the Caribes (15–17, 10–15, 15-10 and 11–15) saw them fall to the third place. The team recovered with a win over the Vampiros (15–7, 15–17, 15-12 and 15–13), but lost their next game to the Criollos (15–8, 5–15, 15–12, 12-15 and 16–17) . The Plataneros defeated the Leones (15–8, 15-7 and 15–11), but continued their inconsistent season with a loss to the Changos (5–15, 15–12, 15–12, 9-15 and 11–15). Corozal won its next game against Yauco (15–1, 16-14 and 15–8) and contracted Manuel Velilla as their coach, winning in his return over Caguas (15–7, 16-14 and 15–8). The team won its tenth game of the season over Ponce (16–14, 15-11 and 15–11). After defeating the Vampiros (15–6, 14–16, 15-8 and 15–11) the Plataneros lost to the Criollos (15–7, 11–15, 14–16, 15-10 and 12–15). For the All-Star Game, the team was represented by Julio Figueroa, Víctor Aponte and Enrique López.

As the season resumed, the Plataneros lost to the Changos in three sets (7–15, 12-15 and 14–16) and the Caribes in four sets (12–15, 7–15, 15-6 and 13–15). Corozal defeated Ponce (15–5, 15-7 and 15–10), but lost to San Sebastián again (14–16, 6-15 and 13–15). To close the season, the team lost to the Changos in five sets (8–15, 9–15, 15–9, 15-12 and 14–16) and defeated the Cafeteros in three sets (17–16, 15-9 and 15–0). Paired with the Caribes to open the semifinal round robin, the Plataneros opened with a win in four sets (10–15, 15–12, 17-15 and 15–10). San Sebastián was able to hit back in four sets (7–15, 15–13, 8-15 and 7–15) . Corozal continued with wins over Caguas (16–14, 15–2, 13-15 and 15–10) and San Sebastián (15–12, 15–7, 8-15 and 15–5). The Plataneros lost to the Changos in four sets (10–15, 15–13, 13-15 and 4–15), defeated the Criollos (15–8, 14–16, 15-9 and 15–4), lost the Caribes (11–15, 12-15 and 13–15) and defeated the Criollos (9–15, 15–10, 15–13, 11-15 and 15–6). The Plataneros bested the Changos, undefeated in the round robin up to this game, in four sets (5–15, 15–10, 15-8 and 15–8). The team closed the series with a loss to San Sebastián (12–15, 13-15 and 2–15), which prompted the replacement of Velilla by Robert Rivera, and consecutive wins over Caguas (15–10, 17-15 and 15–6) and Naranjito (15–13, 15-12 and 15–13). The Plataneros opened the final by besting the Changos in five sets (8–15, 15–11, 10–15, 15-12 and 15–11) and four sets (15–7, 14–16, 15-12 and 17–16). However, Naranjito won two consecutive games to tie the series and the third to take the lead. The Plataneros lost another to the Changos in four sets (16–14, 7–15, 6-15 and 4–15) to finish the season. During the offseason, Rosado tried to acquire José López on a full contract, but Naranjito opposed.

== Season 2013-2014 ==
Note: Flags indicate national team as defined under FIFA eligibility rules; some limited exceptions apply. Players may hold more than one non-FIFA nationality.

No.	Pos.	Nation	Player
—		PUR	Ramón "Monchito" Hernandez (head coach)
1		PUR	Ezequiel Cruz
2		PUR	Josue Nuñez
3		PUR	Omar Rivera
4		PUR	Juan Vazquez
5		PUR	Pedro Cabrera
6		PUR	Juan Caballero
7		PUR	Fernando Morales other=captain

No.	Pos.	Nation	Player
8		PUR	
9		PUR	
10		PUR	
11		PUR	

== Achievements ==
National competitions

- Liga de Voleibol Superior Masculino (9)

- Winner: 1977, 1980, 1981, 1982, 1984, 1987, 2008, 2009
- 2nd place: 1976, 1981, 1983, 1985, 1986, 1990, 1991, 1992, 1993, 1994, 2004, 2010

International competitions

- FIVB Volleyball Men's Club World Championship

- 5th place: 1992, 2009
