= Christian Francois =

Volleyball player from Trinidad and Tobago

Personal information
- Nationality: Trinidad and Tobago
- Born: October 2, 1985 (age 41)
- Weight: 64 kg (141 lb)

Beach volleyball information

Current teammate
Years	Teammate
2009	Kevin Rivers

Previous teammates
Years	Teammate	Tours (points)
2007	Sean Morrison	5

Cristian Francois (born October 2, 1985) is a male beach volleyball and volleyball player from Trinidad and Tobago.

He played in the men's competition at the NORCECA Beach Volleyball Circuit 2007 in Guatemala City, partnering with Sean Morrison and during the 2009 season playing with Kevin Rivers

He won the 2008 National Beach Volleyball Championship playing with Kevin Rivers and the bronze medal at the Sizzlin Sand Beach Volleyball Tour 2008 in Antigua .

In Indoor volleyball, he participated in the 2006 Central American and Caribbean Games and Pan-American Cup 2008 with his National team.

== Awards ==
=== Individuals ===
- 2007 Trinidad and Tobago A Division National League "Best Scorer"

=== Beach ===
- Trinidad and Tobago Beach Volleyball Championship 2008 Gold Medal
- Trinidad and Tobago Beach Volleyball Championship 2007 Silver Medal
- Sizzlin Sand Beach Volleyball Tour 2008 Antigua Bronze Medal
