= Gonzalo Ruiz (volleyball) =

Mexican volleyball player (born 1988)

Personal information
- Full name: Gonzalo Ruiz De La Cruz
- Nationality: Mexican
- Born: 28 April 1988 (age 38)
- Height: 186 cm (6 ft 1 in)
- Weight: 87 kg (192 lb)
- Spike: 345 cm (136 in)
- Block: 325 cm (128 in)

Volleyball information
- Number: 25 (national team)

Career
Years	Teams
2015	IMSS ATN

National team
2015	Mexico

Gonzalo Ruiz De La Cruz (born 28 April 1988) is a Mexican male volleyball player. He is part of the Mexico men's national volleyball team. On club level he plays for IMSS ATN.
