= Ronald Jiménez =

Colombian volleyball player (born 1990)

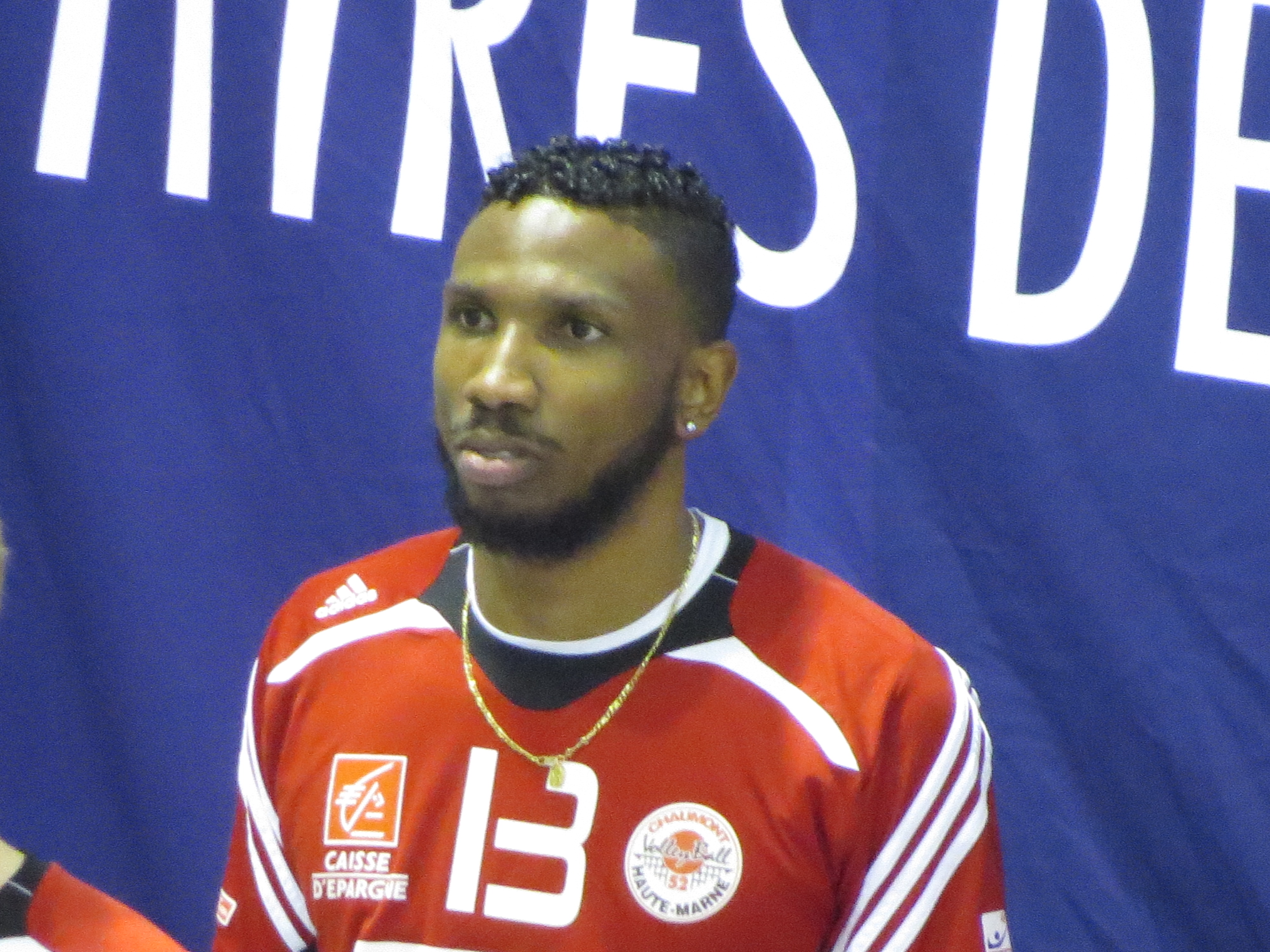

Personal information
- Full name: Ronald Andres Jiménez Zamora
- Nationality: Colombian
- Born: 9 January 1990 (age 36); Cali, Colombia
- Height: 2.00 m (6 ft 7 in)
- Weight: 90 kg (198 lb)
- Spike: 375 cm (148 in)
- Block: 340 cm (134 in)

Volleyball information
- Position: Opposite
- Current club: AS Cannes
- Number: 13

Career
Years	Teams
2010–2011; 2011–2012; 2012–2014; 2014–2015; 2015–2016; 2016–2020; 2020–2021; 2021; 2021–present	Raision Loimu; Olympiacos; Hypo Tirol Innsbruck; Saint Nazaire VB; Chaumont VB 52; Tourcoing LM; Cuprum Lubin; Hyundai Capital Skywalkers; AS Cannes

National team
2010–	Colombia
Honours
Men's volleyball
Representing Colombia
CSV South American Championship
Bronze medal – third place	2015 Maceió

Ronald Andres Jiménez Zamora (born 9 January 1990) is a Colombian professional volleyball player who plays for AS Cannes and the Colombia national team.

== Honours ==
=== Club ===
- 2013–14 Austrian Cup, with Hypo Tirol Innsbruck
- 2013–14 Austrian Championship, with Hypo Tirol Innsbruck
- 2017–18 French Cup, with Tourcoing LM

=== Individual awards ===
- 2015: CSV South American Championship – Best outside spiker
