= Marco Macías =

Mexican volleyball player (born 1985)

Marco Macias

Personal information
- Full name: Marco Antonio Macias Vargas
- Nationality: Mexican
- Born: 12 February 1985 (age 41)
- Height: 193 cm (6 ft 4 in)
- Weight: 86 kg (190 lb)
- Spike: 344 cm (135 in)
- Block: 330 cm (130 in)

Volleyball information
- Number: 3 (national team)

Career
Years	Teams
2014	A.J.Fonte do Bastardo

National team
2014	Mexico

Marco Antonio Macias Vargas (born 12 February 1985) is a former Mexican male volleyball player. He was part of the Mexico men's national volleyball team. On club level he played for A.J.Fonte do Bastardo.
