= Federico Franetovich =

Argentine volleyball player (born 1991)

Personal information
- Nationality: Argentine
- Born: 13 October 1991 (age 35)
- Hometown: Chovet, Santa Fe
- Height: 200 cm (6 ft 7 in)
- Weight: 90 kg (198 lb)
- Spike: 342 cm (135 in)
- Block: 318 cm (125 in)

Volleyball information
- Number: 13 (national team)

Career
Years	Teams
2014-2015	UNTREF

National team
2014-2015	Argentina

Federico Franetovich (born 13 October 1991) is an Argentine male volleyball player. He is part of the Argentina men's national volleyball team. At club level he plays for UNTREF.
