= Puerto Rican Volleyball Federation =

Governing body of volleyball in Puerto Rico

- Sport: Volleyball
- Abbreviation: FPV
- Founded: 1958
- Affiliation: International Volleyball Federation (FIVB)
- Regional affiliation: North, Central America and Caribbean Volleyball Confederation (NORCECA)
- Headquarters: San Juan, Puerto Rico
- President: Dr. César Trabanco

Official website
- www.fedpurvoli.com
- (Puerto Rico)

The Puerto Rican Volleyball Federation (Spanish: Federación Puertoriqueña de Voleibol) is a non-profit organization that serves as the national governing body of volleyball in Puerto Rico. The national federation is recognized by the Fédération Internationale de Volleyball (FIVB) and the Puerto Rican Olympic Committee

== Presidents ==
	Presidents	Years
1	José L. Purcell	1958–1962
2	Enrique Vela	1962–1966
3	Sergio Cobián	1966–1969
4	José Nicolás Palmer	1969–1972
5	Roger Mendoza	1972 -1973
6	Juan Barlucea	1973–1975
7	Libertario Pérez	1976–1978
8	Juan Germán Vázquez	1978–1986
9	Luis R. Mendoza	1986–1994
10	Carlos J. Beltrán Svelti	1994–2009
11	Nelson Pérez	2009–2016
12	César Trabanco	2016–present

== Tournaments ==
- Liga de Voleibol Superior Femenino (LVSF)
- Liga de Voleibol Superior Masculino (LVSM)
- Circuito de Voleibol Playero Profesional (CVP PRO)
