= Alexis Matías =

Puerto Rican volleyball player (born 1974)

Personal information
- Born: July 21, 1974 (age 51)
Medal record
Men's volleyball
Representing Puerto Rico
NORCECA Championship
Silver medal – second place	2007 Anaheim	Team
Pan-American Cup
Silver medal – second place	2007 Santo Domingo	Team
Bronze medal – third place	2010 San Juan	Team

Alexis Matias (born July 21, 1974) is a volleyball player from Puerto Rico, who was a member of the Men's National Team that ended up in sixth place at the 2007 FIVB Men's World Cup in Japan. In the same year the allrounder won the silver medal at the NORCECA Championship in Anaheim. He won with his team the Bronze medal at the 2010 Pan-American Cup.
