= Nolan Tash =

Trinidadian beach volleyball player (born 1977)

Personal information
- Nationality: Trinidad and Tobago
- Born: January 14, 1977 (age 49)
- Height: 193 cm (6 ft 4 in)
- Weight: 92 kg (203 lb)

Beach volleyball information
Teammate
Sean Morrison

Nolan Tash (born January 14, 1977) is a male beach volleyball and volleyball player from Trinidad and Tobago.

== Sports career ==
Partnering with Sean Morrison, he played in the 2003 Pan American Games beach volleyball competitions, finishing in 13th position.

He won the 2007 National Beach Volleyball Championship playing with Sean Morrison.

In Indoor volleyball, he participated in the 2006 Central American and Caribbean Games, Pan-American Cup 2006 and 2008 with his National team.

== Clubs ==
- (Trinidad and Tobago) Big SEPOS (1991–2009)

== Awards ==
=== Individuals ===
- 2010 Central American and Caribbean Games "Best Scorer"

=== Beach ===
- Trinidad and Tobago Beach Volleyball Championship 2007 Gold Medal
- Trinidad and Tobago Beach Volleyball Championship 2008 Silver Medal
