= Víctor Bird =

Puerto Rican volleyball player (born 1982)

Personal information
- Born: March 16, 1982 (age 44)
Medal record
Men's volleyball
Representing Puerto Rico
NORCECA Championship
Silver medal – second place	2007 Anaheim	Team
Pan-American Cup
Silver medal – second place	2007 Santo Domingo	Team

Víctor Bird (born March 16, 1982) is a volleyball player from Puerto Rico, who was a member of the Men's National Team that ended up in sixth place at the 2007 FIVB Men's World Cup in Japan. In the same year the allrounder won the silver medal at the NORCECA Championship in Anaheim.

He is currently playing in Israel for the Maccabi Ranana team. In the season 2009 / 2010 Bird is playing for the Team Moerser SC in the first German league.
