= Iván Contreras =

Mexican volleyball player

Personal information
- Full name: Gerardo Iván Contreras Gámez
- Nationality: Mexico
- Born: January 29, 1974 (age 52); Tampico, Mexico
- Height: 1.98 m (6 ft 6 in)
- Weight: 96 kg (212 lb)
- Spike: 345 cm (136 in)
- Block: 335 cm (132 in)

Volleyball information
- Position: Opposite/Wing Spiker
- Current club: (Puerto Rico) Leones de Ponce
- Number: 7

Career
Teams
	5

National team
Mexico
- Last updated: November 2011

Gerardo Iván Contreras Gámez (born January 29, 1974, in Tampico) is a former Mexican professional volleyball player. His position on the field is outside hitter. Contreras has been voted player of the year in 2005, 2007 and 2008 in Belgium. Contreras is also captain of Knack Roeselare.

Contreras attended Penn State University where he won an NCAA National Championship as a freshman and was named the AVCA National Player of the Year in 1997.

Among Contreras' former teams are Osnabrück in Germany, MTV Näfels in Switzerland, Knack Roeselare in Belgium and Ziraat Bankası Ankara in Turkey.

In 2004, he won the MVP award from the Liga de Voleibol Superior Masculino, playing with Gigantes de Adjuntas. He played for this team from 2002 to 2006.

Before playing volleyball, Contreras was practicing athletics, especially hurdling, high jump and long jump. Contreras had also tried karate and tennis, but he was tired of individual sports and started to play volleyball, which he preferred over basketball.

On May 27, 2008, Contreras revealed that he will sign a lucrative one-year deal with Ziraat Bankası Ankara. He returned to Roeselare after one season.

In recognition of his performance during the 2009, he won the "Luchador Olmeca" award in January, 2010.

== Clubs ==
- (United States) Penn State Nittany Lions men's volleyball
- (Switzerland) MTV Näfels (1997–2000)
- (Puerto Rico) Gigantes de Adjuntas (2000)
- (Belgium) Knack Roeselare (2000–2008)
- (Puerto Rico) Gigantes de Adjuntas (2002–2006)
- (Turkey) Ziraat Bankası Ankara (2008–2009)
- (Belgium) Knack Roeselare (2009–2011)
- (Puerto Rico) Leones de Ponce (2011)

== Individual awards ==
- 1994 "NCAA AVCA Second Team All American"
- 1995 "NCAA AVCA First Team All American"
- 1996 "NCAA AVCA First Team All American"
- 1997 "NCAA AVCA First Team All American and Player of the Year"
- 1998 "Voted Runner up Player of the Year in Switzerland"
- 1999 "Player of the Year in Switzerland"
- 2000 "Player of the Year in Switzerland"
- 2001 "Top Teams Cup Champion"
- 2004 Liga de Voleibol Superior Masculino "MVP"
- 2004–2005 "European Champions League Best Scorer"
- 2004–2005 "Player of the Year in Belgium"
- 2006–2007 "Player of the Year in Belgium"
- 2007–2008 "European Champions League Best Scorer and Best Attacker"
- 2007–2008 "Player of the Year in Belgium"
- 2008 "Best Scorer Olympic Qualifier, Caguas P.R."
- 2009 "MVP in World Championships Qualifier, Guadalajara Mexico"
- 2010 Luchador Olmeca
- 2011 "Best Scorer Panamerican Games, Guadalajara, Mexico"

18
