= Jorge Quiñones (volleyball) =

Mexican volleyball player (born 1981)

Personal information
- Nationality: Mexican
- Born: 13 November 1981 (age 44)
- Height: 1.86 m (6 ft 1 in)
- Weight: 80 kg (176 lb)
- Spike: 330 cm (130 in)
- Block: 325 cm (128 in)

Volleyball information
- Number: 7

Career
| Years | Teams |
|---|---|
| 2014 | (Mexico) Guanajuato |

National team
| 2014 | Mexico |

Jorge Quiñones (born 13 November 1981) is a Mexican male volleyball player. He was part of the Mexico men's national volleyball team at the 2014 FIVB Volleyball Men's World Championship in Poland. He played for Guanajuato.

== Clubs ==
- Guanajuato (2014)
