= Jackson Rivera =

Puerto Rican volleyball player (born 1987)

Personal information
- Full name: Jackson Rivera Fernández
- Nationality: Puerto Rico
- Born: 19 August 1987 (age 39); Aguadilla, Puerto Rico
- Height: 1.86 m (6 ft 1 in)
- Weight: 66 kg (146 lb)
- Spike: 360 cm (142 in)
- Block: 350 cm (138 in)

Volleyball information
- Current club: Changos de Naranjito
- Number: 16

Career
Years	Teams
2014; 2017–	(Puerto Rico) Mets de Guaynabo (Bahrain) Al-Muharraq

National team
2014–	Puerto Rico
- Last updated: 21 April 2018

Jackson Rivera Fernández (born 19 August 1987) is a Puerto Rican male volleyball player. He was part of the Puerto Rico men's national volleyball team at the 2014 FIVB Volleyball Men's World Championship in Poland.

== Clubs ==
- Mets de Guaynabo (2014)
