= Luis Rodríguez (volleyball) =

Puerto Rican volleyball player (born 1969)

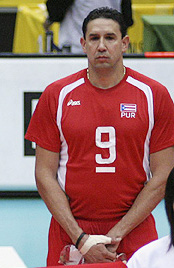
- Rodríguez in 2006

Personal information
- Born: July 13, 1969 (age 56)
Medal record
Men's volleyball
Representing Puerto Rico
NORCECA Championship
Silver medal – second place	2007 Anaheim	Team competition

Luis Rodríguez (Feñito) (born July 13, 1969) is a volleyball player from Puerto Rico, who was a member of the Men's National Team that ended up in sixth place at the 2007 FIVB Men's World Cup in Japan. In the same year the middle-blocker claimed the silver medal at the NORCECA Championship in Anaheim.
