= Gregory Berríos =

Puerto Rican volleyball player (born 1979)

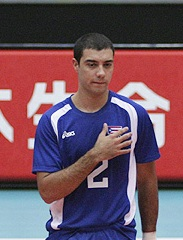
- Gregory Berríos at the 2006 FIVB Volleyball Men's World Championship in Japan

Personal information
- Full name: Gregory J. Berríos Torres
- Nickname: Grego
- Nationality: Puerto Rico
- Born: January 24, 1979 (age 47); San Juan, Puerto Rico
- Hometown: San Juan, Puerto Rico
- Height: 1.82 m (6 ft 0 in)
- Weight: 100 kg (220 lb)
- Spike: 305 cm (120 in)
- Block: 299 cm (118 in)

Volleyball information
- Position: Libero
- Current club: (France) Nice Volley-Ball
- Number: 2

Career
Years	Teams
1999-2001; 2002-2005; 2004-2005; 2005-2006; 2006-2009; 2006-2007; 2007-2008; 2008-2009; 2009-2011; 2012-2013; 2013-2014; 2014-2015	(Puerto Rico) Playeros de San Juan (Puerto Rico) Changos de Naranjito (Spain) Málaga (Spain) J'Hayber Elche (Puerto Rico) Patriotas de Lares (Spain) Unicaja Almería (France) Paris Volley (Latvia) Cesu Alus 'Cesis' (Puerto Rico) Mets de Guaynabo (Puerto Rico) Capitanes de Arecibo (France) Nice Volley-Ball (France) Nice Volley-Ball

National team
2002 - 2013	(Puerto Rico) PUR
Honours
Representing Puerto Rico
Men's volleyball
Central American and Caribbean Games
Gold medal – first place	XIX 2002 El Salvador	Team
Gold medal – first place	XX 2006 Cartagena, Colombia	Team
NORCECA Championship
Silver medal – second place	2007 Anaheim	Team
Bronze medal – third place	2009 Bayamón PR	Team
Pan-American Cup
Silver medal – second place	2007 Santo Domingo	Team
Bronze medal – third place	2010 San Juan	Team
- Last updated: June 2014

Gregory Berríos (born January 24, 1979) is a volleyball player from Puerto Rico, who was a member of the Men's National Team that ended up in sixth place at the 2007 FIVB Men's World Cup in Japan. Playing as a libero he was named Best Receiver at the 2003 NORCECA Championship and Best Digger, Best Receiver and Best Libero at the 2009 NORCECA Championship. He won with his team the Bronze medal and the Best Libero and Best Receiver individual awards at the 2010 Pan-American Cup.

== Personal life ==
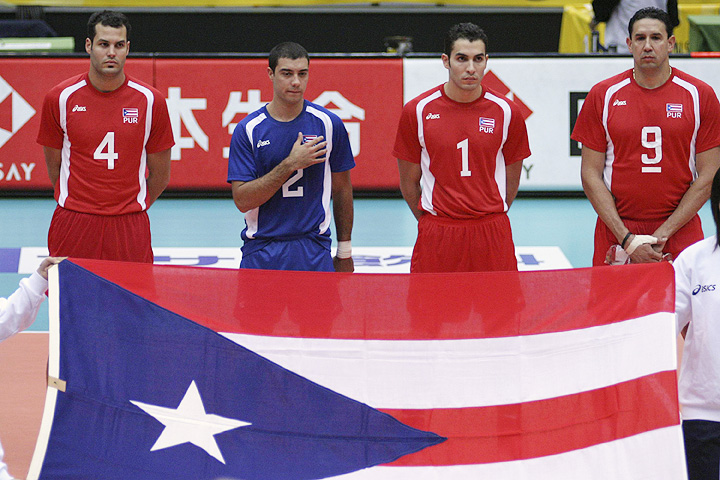
Gregory Berríos (in blue) with members of the Puerto Rico National volleyball team at the 2006 FIVB Volleyball Men's World Championship Games in Japan

Berríos was born in San Juan, Puerto Rico to Gregorio Berríos and Ivette Torres. Berrios has three brothers, (Héctor Berríos, Aksel Berríos and Christopher Berríos). Berríos is a graduate of Academia Santa Teresita in Santurce, Puerto Rico and did play volleyball in high school.

== College ==
Berríos attended the University of Puerto Rico, Rio Piedras Campus where he majored in Visual Arts. He was a freshman in 1998, played outside hitter for the college team until 2001 winning their LAI Volleyball Championship against University of the Sacred Heart (Puerto Rico).

== Clubs ==
- (Puerto Rico) Playeros de San Juan (1999–2001)
- (Puerto Rico) Changos de Naranjito (2002–2005)
- (Spain) Málaga España (2004–2005)
- (Spain) J'Hayber Elche (2005–2006)
- (Puerto Rico) Patriotas de Lares (2006–2009)
- (Spain) CV Almería (2006–2007)
- (France) Paris Volley (2007–2008)
- (Latvia) Cesu Alus 'Cesis' (2008–2009)
- (Puerto Rico) Mets de Guaynabo (2009–2011)
- (Puerto Rico) Capitanes de Arecibo (2012–2014)
- (France) Nice Volley-Ball (2013–2014)

== International ==
=== Recent international competition ===
- 2010
  - V Panamerican Cup (Bronze Medal)
- 2009
  - NORCECA Continental Championship (Bronze Medal)
- 2008
  - NORCECA Continental Olympic Qualifying Championship (Silver Medal)
- 2007
  - FIVB World Cup JAPAN (6th place)
  - Pan American Games (6th place)
  - NORCECA Continental Championship (Silver Medal)
- 2006
  - FIVB World Championships JAPAN (12th place)
  - XX Central American and Caribbean Games (Gold Medal)
- 2005
  - FIVB World Championships Qualification (Silver Medal)
- 2003
  - NORCECA Continental Championship (5th place)
- 2002
  - XIX Central American and Caribbean Games (Gold Medal)

== Awards ==
=== Individuals ===
- 2003 NORCECA Championship "Best Receiver"
- 2005 FIVB World Championships 2006 Qualification Tournament "Best Digger"
- 2005 FIVB World Championships 2006 Qualification Tournament "Best Libero"
- 2006 FIVB World Championships 2006 "2nd Best Digger"
- 2007 FIVB World Cup 2007 "3rd Best Digger"
- 2007 Pan-American Games "Best Defender"
- 2008 Olympics Games Qualification Tournament "Best Digger"
- 2009 NORCECA FIVB World Championship Qualification Tournament "Best Libero"
- 2009 NORCECA FIVB World Championship Qualification Tournament "Best Receiver"
- 2009 NORCECA Championship "Best Digger"
- 2009 NORCECA Championship "Best Receiver"
- 2009 NORCECA Championship "Best Libero"
- 2010 Pan-American Cup "Best Libero"
- 2010 Pan-American Cup "Best Receiver"
- 2011 Puerto Rico Volleyball League "Best Libero"
- 2012 Summer Olympics Qualification Tournament "Best Libero"
