= José Rivera (volleyball) =

Puerto Rican volleyball player (born 1977)

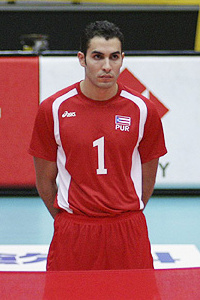
- Rivera in 2006

Personal information
- Born: 2 July 1977 (age 48)
Medal record
Men's volleyball
Representing Puerto Rico
NORCECA Championship
Silver medal – second place	2007 Anaheim	Team
Pan-American Cup
Bronze medal – third place	2010 San Juan	Team

José Rivera (born July 2, 1977) is a volleyball player from Puerto Rico.

He was a member of the Men's National Team that ended up in sixth place at the 2007 FIVB Men's World Cup in Japan. In the same year the wing-spiker won the silver medal at the NORCECA Championship in Anaheim. He won with his team the Bronze medal at the 2010 Pan-American Cup.
