= Ángel Pérez (volleyball) =

Puerto Rican volleyball player (born 1982)

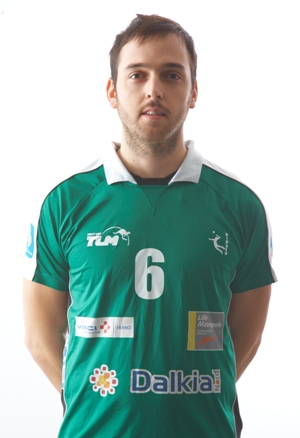

Personal information
- Born: May 28, 1982 (age 44) Río Piedras, Puerto Rico
Medal record
Men's volleyball
Representing Puerto Rico
NORCECA Championship
Silver medal – second place	2007 Anaheim	Team
Pan-American Cup
Bronze medal – third place	2010 San Juan	Team

Ángel Pérez (born May 20, 1982) is a Puerto Rican volleyball coach and former player who is the current head coach of the Columbus Fury. He was a member of the Men's National Team that ended up in sixth place at the 2007 FIVB Men's World Cup in Japan. In the same year the setter claimed the silver medal at the NORCECA Championship in Anaheim. He won with his team the bronze medal at the 2010 Pan-American Cup.
