= Tomás Aguilera =

Mexican volleyball player (born 1988)

Tomás Aguilera Robles
Personal information
- Born: 15 November 1988 (age 37) Chihuahua, Mexico
- Height: 2.02 m (6 ft 8 in)
- Weight: 95 kg (209 lb)
- Spike: 350 cm (138 in)
- Block: 340 cm (134 in)

Volleyball information
- Number: 14

Career
- Years: Team
- 2014: (Mexico) Chihuahua

National team
- Years: Team
- 2014: Mexico

Tomás Aguilera (born 15 November 1988) is a Mexican male volleyball player. He was part of the Mexico men's national volleyball team at the 2014 FIVB Volleyball Men's World Championship in Poland. He played for Chihuahua.

== Clubs ==
- Chihuahua (2014)
