= Víctor Rivera (volleyball) =

Puerto Rican volleyball player (born 1976)

Medal record

Men's volleyball

Representing Puerto Rico

NORCECA Championship
Silver medal – second place	2007 Anaheim	Team

Pan-American Cup
Bronze medal – third place	2010 San Juan	Team

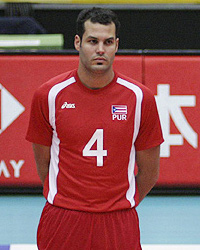
Victor Rivera at Japan in 2006

Víctor Rivera (born August 30, 1976) is a volleyball player from Puerto Rico, who was a member of the Men's National Team that ended up in sixth place at the 2007 FIVB Men's World Cup in Japan. In the same year the wing-spiker was named Best Spiker at the NORCECA Championship in Anaheim. He won with his team the Bronze medal and the Best Scorer individual award at the 2010 Pan-American Cup.

== Awards ==
=== Individuals ===
- 2010 Pan-American Cup "Best Scorer"
- 2007 NORCECA Championship "Best Spiker"
