= 2010 Men's Pan-American Volleyball Cup =

Tournament details
- Host country: Puerto Rico
- Dates: May 22 – 30, 2010
- Teams: 9
- Venue: Roberto Clemente Coliseum (in San Juan host cities)

Final positions
- Champions: United States (4th title)

Tournament awards
- MVP: (United States) Jayson Jablonsky

The 2010 Pan-American Volleyball Cup was the fifth edition of the annual men's volleyball tournament, played by nine countries over May 22–30, 2010, in San Juan, Puerto Rico. The event served as a qualifier for the 2011 FIVB World League Qualification.

== Teams ==
Pool A	Pool B	Pool C
Brazil; Colombia; Canada	Puerto Rico; Mexico; United States	Dominican Republic; Argentina; Venezuela

== Preliminary round ==
=== Pool A ===
Pos	Team	Pld	W	L	Pts	SW	SL	SR	SPW	SPL	SPR	Qualification
1	Brazil	2	2	0	4	6	3	2.000	200	181	1.105	Semifinals
2	Canada	2	1	1	3	5	3	1.667	179	157	1.140	Quarterfinals
3	Colombia	2	0	2	2	1	6	0.167	136	177	0.768	

Date	Time		Score		Set 1	Set 2	Set 3	Set 4	Set 5	Total	Report
24 May	16:00	Brazil	3–1	Colombia	25–17	25–14	24–26	25–23		99–80	P2 P3
25 May	19:02	Canada	2–3	Brazil	25–16	25–20	20–25	23–25	8–15	101–101	P2 P3
26 May	16:00	Colombia	0–3	Canada	26–28	16–25	14–25			56–78	P2 P3

=== Pool B ===
Pos	Team	Pld	W	L	Pts	SW	SL	SR	SPW	SPL	SPR	Qualification
1	United States	2	2	0	4	6	3	2.000	204	188	1.085	Quarterfinals
2	Puerto Rico	2	1	1	3	4	4	1.000	181	180	1.006	Quarterfinals
3	Mexico	2	0	2	2	3	6	0.500	189	206	0.917	

Date	Time		Score		Set 1	Set 2	Set 3	Set 4	Set 5	Total	Report
24 May	22:18	Puerto Rico	3–1	Mexico	25–20	21–25	25–23	25–18		96–86	P2 P3
25 May	22:09	Mexico	2–3	United States	25–19	23–25	18–25	28–26	9–15	103–110	P2 P3
26 May	21:05	United States	3–1	Puerto Rico	19–25	25–19	25–18	25–23		94–85	P2 P3

=== Pool C ===
Pos	Team	Pld	W	L	Pts	SW	SL	SR	SPW	SPL	SPR	Qualification
1	Argentina	2	2	0	4	6	0	MAX	151	119	1.269	Semifinals
2	Dominican Republic	2	1	1	3	3	3	1.000	140	130	1.077	Quarterfinals
3	Venezuela	2	0	2	2	0	6	0.000	108	150	0.720	

Date	Time		Score		Set 1	Set 2	Set 3	Set 4	Set 5	Total	Report
24 May	19:00	Dominican Republic	0–3	Argentina	19–25	24–26	22–25			65–76	P2 P3
25 May	16:00	Argentina	3–0	Venezuela	25–13	25–19	25–22			75–54	P2 P3
26 May	19:00	Venezuela	0–3	Dominican Republic	18–25	17–25	19–25			54–75	P2 P3

== Final round ==
=== Championship bracket ===
First round
27 May – San Juan
United States	3
Dominican Republic	0
27 May – San Juan
Canada	2
Puerto Rico	3

Semifinals
28 May – San Juan
United States	3
Brazil	0
28 May – San Juan
Puerto Rico	2
Argentina	3
Fifth place
29 May – San Juan
Dominican Republic	0
Canada	3

Final
29 May – San Juan
United States	3
Argentina	0
Third place
29 May – San Juan
Brazil	1
Puerto Rico	3

=== 7th–9th places bracket ===
9th place match			7th place match
			1	Mexico	3
2	Venezuela	2		Colombia	1
3	Colombia	3

=== 7th–9th places ===
Date	Time		Score		Set 1	Set 2	Set 3	Set 4	Set 5	Total	Report
27 May	16:00	Venezuela	2–3	Colombia	22–25	25–19	25–21	21–25	15–17	108–107	P2 P3

=== Quarterfinals ===
Date	Time		Score		Set 1	Set 2	Set 3	Set 4	Set 5	Total	Report
27 May	19:04	United States	3–0	Dominican Republic	25–14	25–18	25–18			75–50	P2 P3
27 May	21:32	Canada	2–3	Puerto Rico	23–25	25–17	22–25	30–28	14–16	114–111	P2 P3

=== Semifinals ===
Date	Time		Score		Set 1	Set 2	Set 3	Set 4	Set 5	Total	Report
28 May	18:40	United States	3–0	Brazil	26–24	26–24	25–18			77–66	P2 P3
28 May	20:56	Puerto Rico	2–3	Argentina	29–27	25–23	20–25	22–25	10–15	106–115	P2 P3

=== 7th place ===
Date	Time		Score		Set 1	Set 2	Set 3	Set 4	Set 5	Total	Report
28 May	16:02	Mexico	3–1	Colombia	25–19	23–25	25–15	25–20		98–79	P2 P3

=== 5th place ===
Date	Time		Score		Set 1	Set 2	Set 3	Set 4	Set 5	Total	Report
29 May	16:00	Dominican Republic	0–3	Canada	15–25	26–28	10–25			51–78	P2 P3

=== 3rd place ===
Date	Time		Score		Set 1	Set 2	Set 3	Set 4	Set 5	Total	Report
29 May	18:30	Brazil	1–3	Puerto Rico	18–25	17–25	25–16	17–25		77–91	P2 P3

=== Final ===
Date	Time		Score		Set 1	Set 2	Set 3	Set 4	Set 5	Total	Report
29 May	21:10	United States	3–0	Argentina	25–23	25–21	30–28			80–72	P2 P3

== Final standing ==
Rank	Team
1st place, gold medalist(s)	United States
2nd place, silver medalist(s)	Argentina
3rd place, bronze medalist(s)	Puerto Rico
4	Brazil
5	Canada
6	Dominican Republic
7	Mexico
8	Colombia
9	Venezuela

2010 Men's Pan-American Cup champions

United States
4th title

- Puerto Rico qualified for the 2011 FIVB World League qualification.

== Awards ==
- MVP: (United States) Jayson Jablonsky
- Best scorer: (Puerto Rico) Victor Rivera
- Best spiker: (United States) Jayson Jablonsky
- Best blocker: (Brazil) Gustavo Bonatto
- Best server: (Argentina) Mariano Giustiniano
- Best digger: (Mexico) Mario Becerra
- Best setter: (Mexico) Pedro Rangel
- Best receiver: (Puerto Rico) Gregory Berrios
- Best libero: (Puerto Rico) Gregory Berrios
- Rising Star: (Venezuela) Henderson Espinoza
