= 2013 FIVB Volleyball World League squads =

Below there are the squads from the participating teams of the 2013 FIVB Volleyball World League.

Players' age as of 31 May 2013: the tournament's opening day.

== Argentina ==
#	Name	Birthdate
1	Pablo Koukartsev	25 March 1993 (aged 20)
2	Ivan Castellani	19 January 1991 (aged 22)
3	Demián González	21 February 1983 (aged 30)
4	Martin Ramos	26 August 1991 (aged 21)
5	Nicolás Uriarte	21 March 1990 (aged 23)
6	Cristian Poglajen	14 July 1989 (aged 23)
7	Facundo Conte	25 August 1989 (aged 23)
8	Frederico Franetovich	13 October 1991 (aged 21)
9	Rodrigo Quiroga	23 March 1987 (aged 26)
10	Nicolas Bruno	24 February 1989 (aged 24)
11	Sebastián Sole	12 June 1991 (aged 21)
12	Federico Pereyra	19 June 1988 (aged 24)
13	TTomás Ruiz	16 April 1992 (aged 21)
14	Pablo Crer	12 June 1989 (aged 23)
15	Luciano De Cecco	2 June 1988 (aged 24)
16	Alexis González	21 July 1981 (aged 31)
17	Bruno Romanutti	5 July 1989 (aged 23)
18	Facundo Santucci	6 March 1987 (aged 26)
19	Maximiliano Gauna	29 April 1989 (aged 24)
20	Pablo Bengolea	8 May 1986 (aged 27)
21	Juan Ignacio Finoli	5 November 1991 (aged 21)
22	Guillermo García	21 September 1983 (aged 29)
Coach	Javier Weber	6 January 1966 (aged 47)

== Brazil ==
#	Name	Birthdate
1	Bruno Rezende (C)	2 July 1986 (aged 26)
2	Isac Santos	13 December 1990 (aged 22)
3	Éder Carbonera	19 October 1983 (aged 29)
4	Wallace Souza	26 June 1987 (aged 25)
5	Sidnei Santos	9 July 1982 (aged 30)
6	Leandro Vissotto	30 April 1983 (aged 30)
7	William Arjona	31 July 1979 (aged 33)
8	Ricardo Lucarelli	14 February 1992 (aged 21)
9	Théo Lopes	31 August 1983 (aged 29)
10	Alan Domingos	15 February 1980 (aged 33)
11	Thiago Alves	26 July 1986 (aged 26)
12	Luiz Fonteles	19 June 1984 (aged 28)
13	Maurício Souza	29 September 1988 (aged 24)
14	Renan Buiatti	10 January 1990 (aged 23)
15	João Paulo Bravo	7 January 1979 (aged 34)
16	Lucas Saatkamp	6 March 1986 (aged 27)
17	Murilo Radke	31 January 1989 (aged 24)
18	Dante Amaral	30 September 1980 (aged 32)
19	Mário Pedreira	3 May 1982 (aged 31)
20	Raphael Oliveira	14 June 1979 (aged 33)
21	Ary Nóbrega	10 July 1991 (aged 21)
22	Maurício Borges Silva	4 February 1989 (aged 24)
Coach	Bernardo Rezende	28 March 1959 (aged 54)

== Bulgaria ==
#	Name	Birthdate
1	Georgi Bratoev	21 October 1987 (aged 25)
2	Borislav Apostolov	7 December 1990 (aged 22)
3	Stoyan Samunev	15 April 1983 (aged 30)
4	Martin Bozhilov	11 April 1988 (aged 25)
5	Svetoslav Gotsev	31 August 1990 (aged 22)
6	Danail Milushev	3 February 1984 (aged 29)
7	Stanislav Petkov	31 December 1987 (aged 25)
8	Todor Skrimov	9 January 1990 (aged 23)
9	Dobromir Dimitrov	7 July 1991 (aged 21)
10	Valentin Bratoev	21 October 1987 (aged 25)
11	Georgi Seganov	10 June 1993 (aged 19)
12	Viktor Yosifov	16 October 1985 (aged 27)
13	Teodor Salparov (L)	16 August 1982 (aged 30)
14	Todor Valchev	18 January 1989 (aged 24)
15	Todor Aleksiev (C)	21 April 1983 (aged 30)
16	Miroslav Gradinarov	10 February 1985 (aged 28)
17	Nikolay Penchev	22 May 1992 (aged 21)
18	Nikolay Uchikov	13 April 1986 (aged 27)
19	Tsvetan Sokolov	31 December 1989 (aged 23)
20	Rozalin Penchev	11 December 1994 (aged 18)
21	Krasimir Georgiev	13 February 1995 (aged 18)
22	Ivan Stanev	29 January 1986 (aged 27)
Coach	Camillo Placi

== Canada ==
#	Name	Birthdate
1	Louis-Pierre Mainville	3 April 1986 (aged 27)
2	Nicholas Hoag	19 August 1992 (aged 20)
3	Daniel Lewis (L)	3 April 1976 (aged 37)
4	Joshua Howatson	7 October 1984 (aged 28)
5	Rudy Verhoeff	24 June 1989 (aged 23)
6	Justin Duff	10 May 1988 (aged 25)
7	Dallas Soonias	25 April 1984 (aged 29)
8	Adam Simac	9 August 1983 (aged 29)
9	Dustin Schneider	27 February 1985 (aged 28)
10	Toontje Van Lankvelt	1 July 1984 (aged 28)
11	Steve Brinkman	12 January 1978 (aged 35)
12	Gavin Schmitt	27 January 1986 (aged 27)
13	Olivier Faucher	14 September 1984 (aged 28)
14	Adam Kaminski	27 May 1984 (aged 29)
15	Frederic Winters (C)	21 April 1983 (aged 30)
16	Stephen Gotch	18 October 1985 (aged 27)
17	Graham Vigrass	17 June 1989 (aged 23)
18	John Gordon Perrin	17 August 1989 (aged 23)
19	Blair Bann (L)	26 February 1988 (aged 25)
20	Ciaran McGovern	5 June 1989 (aged 23)
21	Jason DeRocco	19 September 1989 (aged 23)
22	Christopher Hoag	3 September 1989 (aged 23)
Coach	Glenn Hoag

== Cuba ==
#	Name	Birthdate
1	Wilfredo León Venero	31 July 1993 (aged 19)
2	Lian Sem Estrada Jova (C)	12 December 1982 (aged 30)
3	Gustavo Leyva Álvarez (L)	14 December 1985 (aged 27)
4	Javier Ernesto Jimenez Scull	16 November 1989 (aged 23)
5	Leandro Macías Infante	13 February 1990 (aged 23)
6	Keibel Gutiérrez Torna (L)	6 May 1987 (aged 26)
7	Osmani Uriarte Mestre	4 June 1995 (aged 17)
8	Rolando Cepeda Abreu	13 March 1989 (aged 24)
9	Livan Osoria Rodriguez	5 February 1994 (aged 19)
10	Danger Jorber Quintana Guerra	19 May 1994 (aged 19)
11	Lazaro Raydel Fundora Travieso	13 February 1994 (aged 19)
12	Abrahan Alfonso Gavilan	23 February 1995 (aged 18)
13	David Fiel Rodriguez	28 August 1993 (aged 19)
14	Yordan Bisset Astengo	21 October 1994 (aged 18)
15	Dariel Albo Miranda	11 February 1992 (aged 21)
16	Isbel Mesa Sandobal	2 June 1989 (aged 23)
17	Alfonso Alexis Lamadrid	3 February 1993 (aged 20)
18	Yoandri Díaz	4 January 1985 (aged 28)
19	Extensa Marin Barbaro David	20 June 1996 (aged 16)
20	Dayron Arias Romero	5 February 1994 (aged 19)
21	Jorge Felix Caraballo Castillo	14 July 1987 (aged 25)
22	Yohan Armando Leon Napoles	24 January 1995 (aged 18)
Coach	Samuels Blackwood	31 December 1946 (aged 66)

== Finland ==
#	Name	Birthdate
1	Juha Aho	14 February 1981 (aged 32)
2	Eemi Tervaportti	26 July 1989 (aged 23)
3	Mikko Esko	3 September 1978 (aged 34)
4	Lauri Kerminen (L)	18 January 1993 (aged 20)
5	Antti Siltala (C)	14 March 1984 (aged 29)
6	Niklas Seppänen	30 June 1993 (aged 19)
7	Matti Hietanen	3 January 1983 (aged 30)
8	Elviss Krastins	15 September 1994 (aged 18)
9	Tommi Siirilä	5 August 1993 (aged 19)
10	Urpo Sivula	15 March 1988 (aged 25)
11	Juho Rajala	24 March 1987 (aged 26)
12	Olli Kunnari	2 February 1982 (aged 31)
13	Mikko Oivanen	26 May 1986 (aged 27)
14	Konstantin Shumov	15 February 1985 (aged 28)
15	Matti Oivanen	26 May 1986 (aged 27)
16	Olli-Pekka Ojansivu	31 December 1987 (aged 25)
17	Antti Esko	30 July 1982 (aged 30)
18	Jukka Lehtonen	22 February 1982 (aged 31)
19	Joni Mikkonen	13 June 1986 (aged 26)
20	Aleksi Kaatrasalo	24 May 1990 (aged 23)
21	Jouni Palokangas	23 November 1986 (aged 26)
22	Ville Juntura	26 March 1985 (aged 28)
Coach	Tuomas Sammelvuo	16 February 1976 (aged 37)

== France ==
#	Name	Birthdate
1	José Trèfle	16 January 1980 (aged 33)
2	Jenia Grebennikov	13 August 1990 (aged 22)
3	Gérald Hardy-Dessources (L)	9 February 1983 (aged 30)
4	Antonin Rouzier	18 August 1986 (aged 26)
5	Rafael Redwitz	12 August 1980 (aged 32)
6	Benjamin Toniutti (C)	30 October 1989 (aged 23)
7	Nicolas Marechal	4 March 1987 (aged 26)
8	Marien Moreau	25 October 1983 (aged 29)
9	Baptiste Geiler	12 March 1987 (aged 26)
10	Jean-Philippe Sol	1 January 1986 (aged 27)
11	Julien Lyneel	15 April 1990 (aged 23)
12	Earvin N'Gapeth	12 February 1991 (aged 22)
13	Pierre Pujol	13 July 1984 (aged 28)
14	Nicolas Le Goff	15 February 1992 (aged 21)
15	Samuele Tuia	24 July 1986 (aged 26)
16	Kevin Tillie	2 November 1990 (aged 22)
17	Franck Lafitte	8 March 1989 (aged 24)
18	Jean-François Exiga (L)	9 March 1982 (aged 31)
19	Guillaume Quesque	29 April 1989 (aged 24)
20	Kevin Le Roux	11 May 1989 (aged 24)
21	Mory Sidibe	17 June 1987 (aged 25)
22	Toafa Takaniko	29 May 1985 (aged 28)
Coach	Laurent Tillie

== Germany ==
#	Name	Birthdate
1	Christian Fromm	15 August 1990 (aged 22)
2	Markus Steuerwald (L)	7 March 1989 (aged 24)
3	Jan-Philipp Marks	3 April 1992 (aged 21)
4	Merten Krüger	8 November 1990 (aged 22)
5	Dirk Westphal	31 January 1986 (aged 27)
6	Denys Kaliberda	24 June 1990 (aged 22)
7	Sebastian Krause	16 October 1989 (aged 23)
8	Marcus Böhme	25 August 1985 (aged 27)
9	Björn Höhne	27 March 1991 (aged 22)
10	Jochen Schöps (C)	8 October 1983 (aged 29)
11	Lukas Kampa	29 November 1986 (aged 26)
12	Ferdinand Tille (L)	8 December 1988 (aged 24)
13	Simon Hirsch	3 April 1992 (aged 21)
14	Tom Strohbach	27 May 1992 (aged 21)
15	Tim Broshog	2 December 1987 (aged 25)
16	Felix Fischer	27 February 1983 (aged 30)
17	Patrick Steuerwald	3 March 1986 (aged 27)
18	Georg Klein	22 August 1991 (aged 21)
19	Paul Sprung	5 March 1991 (aged 22)
20	Philipp Collin	28 October 1990 (aged 22)
21	Felix Isaak	2 September 1989 (aged 23)
22	Sebastian Kühner	15 March 1987 (aged 26)
Coach	Vital Heynen

== Iran ==
#	Name	Birthdate
1	Shahram Mahmoudi	20 July 1988 (aged 24)
2	Adel Gholami	9 February 1986 (aged 27)
3	Saman Faezi	23 August 1991 (aged 21)
4	Saeid Marouf (C)	20 October 1985 (aged 27)
5	Farhad Ghaemi	28 August 1989 (aged 23)
6	Mohammad Mousavi	22 August 1987 (aged 25)
7	Hamzeh Zarini	18 October 1985 (aged 27)
8	Farhad Zarif	3 March 1983 (aged 30)
9	Mojtaba Yousefi	13 April 1988 (aged 25)
10	Amir Ghafour	6 June 1991 (aged 21)
11	Rahman Davoudi	18 February 1988 (aged 25)
12	Pouria Fayyazi	12 January 1993 (aged 20)
13	Mehdi Mahdavi	13 February 1984 (aged 29)
14	Arash Keshavarzi	16 February 1987 (aged 26)
15	Reza Ghara	31 July 1991 (aged 21)
16	Armin Tashakkori	8 December 1986 (aged 26)
17	Alireza Jadidi	11 February 1989 (aged 24)
18	Mohammad Taher Vadi	10 October 1989 (aged 23)
19	Arash Kamalvand	11 May 1989 (aged 24)
20	Alireza Mobasheri	10 June 1988 (aged 24)
21	Masoud Gholami	2 April 1990 (aged 23)
22	Nasser Rahimi	27 June 1991 (aged 21)
Coach	Julio Velasco	9 February 1952 (aged 61)

== Italy ==
#	Name	Birthdate
1	Thomas Beretta	18 April 1990 (aged 23)
2	Jiri Kovar	10 April 1989 (aged 24)
3	Simone Parodi	16 June 1986 (aged 26)
4	Luca Vettori	26 April 1991 (aged 22)
5	Giorgio De Togni	7 July 1985 (aged 27)
6	Ludovico Dolfo	30 June 1989 (aged 23)
7	Enrico Cester	16 March 1988 (aged 25)
8	Gabriele Maruotti	25 March 1988 (aged 25)
9	Ivan Zaytsev	2 October 1988 (aged 24)
10	Filippo Lanza	3 March 1991 (aged 22)
11	Cristian Savani (C)	22 February 1982 (aged 31)
12	Daniele Mazzone	4 June 1992 (aged 20)
13	Dragan Travica	28 August 1986 (aged 26)
14	Matteo Piano	24 October 1990 (aged 22)
15	Emanuele Birarelli	8 February 1981 (aged 32)
16	Michele Baranowicz	5 August 1989 (aged 23)
17	Andrea Giovi (L)	19 August 1983 (aged 29)
18	Giulio Sabbi	10 August 1989 (aged 23)
19	Marco Falaschi	18 September 1987 (aged 25)
20	Salvatore Rossini	13 July 1986 (aged 26)
21	Michele Fedrizzi	16 March 1988 (aged 25)
22	Davide Saitta	17 June 1986 (aged 26)
Coach	Mauro Berruto	8 May 1969 (aged 44)

== Japan ==
#	Name	Birthdate
1	Yuji Suzuki	7 June 1986 (aged 26)
2	Yuhei Tsukazaki	11 July 1986 (aged 26)
3	Takeshi Nagano (L)	11 July 1985 (aged 27)
4	Shigeru Kondoh	23 November 1982 (aged 30)
5	Shun Imamura	20 July 1987 (aged 25)
6	Yoshifumi Suzuki	31 March 1983 (aged 30)
7	Masashi Kuriyama	14 July 1988 (aged 24)
8	Kazuyoshi Yokota	1 May 1986 (aged 27)
9	Takaaki Tomimatsu	20 July 1984 (aged 28)
10	Dai Tezuka	18 November 1988 (aged 24)
11	Yoshihiko Matsumoto	7 January 1981 (aged 32)
12	Kota Yamamura (C)	20 October 1980 (aged 32)
13	Ken Takahashi	22 December 1988 (aged 24)
14	Tatsuya Fukuzawa	1 July 1986 (aged 26)
15	Daisuke Yako	7 October 1988 (aged 24)
16	Yusuke Ishijima	9 January 1984 (aged 29)
17	Yu Koshikawa	30 June 1984 (aged 28)
18	Yuta Yoneyama	29 August 1984 (aged 28)
19	Shunsuke Chijiki	6 September 1989 (aged 23)
20	Yuta Matsuoka	6 November 1989 (aged 23)
21	Takashi Dekita	13 August 1991 (aged 21)
22	Issei Maeda	22 September 1991 (aged 21)
Coach	Gary Sato

== Netherlands ==
#	Name	Birthdate
1	Nimir Abdel-Aziz	5 February 1992 (aged 21)
2	Nico Freriks	22 December 1981 (aged 31)
3	Daan van Haarlem	15 March 1989 (aged 24)
4	Thijs Ter Horst	18 September 1981 (aged 31)
5	Jelte Maan	19 March 1986 (aged 27)
6	Humphrey Krolis	13 July 1984 (aged 28)
7	Gijs Jorna	30 May 1989 (aged 24)
8	Bas van Bemmelen	18 August 1989 (aged 23)
9	Ewoud Gommans	17 November 1990 (aged 22)
10	Jeroen Rauwerdink	13 September 1985 (aged 27)
11	Sjoerd Hoogendoorn	17 February 1991 (aged 22)
12	Wytze Kooistra	3 June 1982 (aged 30)
13	Maarten van Garderen	24 January 1990 (aged 23)
14	Niels Klapwijk	19 September 1985 (aged 27)
15	Thomas Koelewijn	18 December 1985 (aged 27)
16	Robin Overbeeke	21 March 1989 (aged 24)
17	Johannes Cornelius Bontje (C)	12 May 1981 (aged 32)
18	Robbert Andringa	28 April 1990 (aged 23)
19	Michael Parkinson	23 November 1991 (aged 21)
20	Dick Kooy	3 December 1987 (aged 25)
21	Kay van Dijk	25 June 1984 (aged 28)
22	Dirk-Jan van Gendt	18 July 1974 (aged 38)
Coach	Edwin Benne

== Poland ==
#	Name	Birthdate
1	Piotr Nowakowski	18 December 1987 (aged 25)
2	Michał Winiarski	28 September 1983 (aged 29)
3	Dawid Konarski	31 August 1988 (aged 24)
4	Grzegorz Kosok	2 March 1986 (aged 27)
5	Wojciech Włodarczyk	28 October 1990 (aged 22)
6	Bartosz Kurek	29 August 1988 (aged 24)
7	Jakub Jarosz	10 February 1987 (aged 26)
8	Andrzej Wrona	27 December 1988 (aged 24)
9	Zbigniew Bartman	4 May 1987 (aged 26)
10	Łukasz Wiśniewski	3 February 1989 (aged 24)
11	Fabian Drzyzga	3 January 1990 (aged 23)
12	Paweł Woicki	19 June 1983 (aged 29)
13	Michał Kubiak	18 July 1988 (aged 24)
14	Michał Ruciak	22 August 1983 (aged 29)
15	Łukasz Żygadło	2 August 1979 (aged 33)
16	Krzysztof Ignaczak (L)	15 May 1978 (aged 35)
17	Paweł Zatorski (L)	21 June 1990 (aged 22)
18	Marcin Możdżonek (C)	9 February 1985 (aged 28)
19	Wojciech Ferens	5 April 1991 (aged 22)
20	Grzegorz Łomacz	21 January 1991 (aged 22)
21	Damian Wojtaszek	7 September 1988 (aged 24)
22	Krzysztof Wierzbowski	18 July 1988 (aged 24)
Coach	Andrea Anastasi	10 August 1960 (aged 52)

== Portugal ==
#	Name	Birthdate
1	Marcel Gil	8 May 1990 (aged 23)
2	Ubirajara Pereira	25 August 1970 (aged 42)
3	Carlos Liborio	7 July 1990 (aged 22)
4	João Coelho (L)	24 June 1981 (aged 31)
5	Marco Ferreira	4 October 1987 (aged 25)
6	Alexandre Ferreira	13 November 1991 (aged 21)
7	Ivo Casas	21 September 1992 (aged 20)
8	Tiago Violas	27 March 1989 (aged 24)
9	Nuno Pinheiro	31 December 1984 (aged 28)
10	Filipe Pinto	26 February 1991 (aged 22)
11	Carlos Fidalgo	16 May 1987 (aged 26)
12	João José (C)	7 June 1978 (aged 34)
13	Valdir Sequeira	22 November 1981 (aged 31)
14	Idner Martins	19 December 1978 (aged 34)
15	Rui Santos	24 March 1984 (aged 29)
16	José Gomes	21 October 1994 (aged 18)
17	Miguel Rodrigues	2 November 1986 (aged 26)
18	André Lopes	12 September 1982 (aged 30)
19	Ricardo Silva	30 August 1990 (aged 22)
20	João Magalhães	13 June 1988 (aged 24)
21	José Monteiro	21 October 1991 (aged 21)
22	Eurico Peixoto	13 May 1981 (aged 32)
Coach	Flavio Gulinelli

== Russia ==
#	Name	Birthdate
1	Sergey Antipkin	28 March 1986 (aged 27)
2	Sergey Makarov	28 March 1980 (aged 33)
3	Nikolay Apalikov	26 August 1982 (aged 30)
4	Taras Khtey (C)	22 May 1982 (aged 31)
5	Sergey Grankin	21 January 1985 (aged 28)
6	Evgeny Sivozhelez	6 August 1986 (aged 26)
7	Nikolay Pavlov	22 May 1982 (aged 31)
8	Alexey Rodichev	24 March 1988 (aged 25)
9	Alexey Spiridonov	26 June 1988 (aged 24)
10	Yury Berezhko	27 January 1984 (aged 29)
11	Andrey Ashchev	10 May 1983 (aged 30)
12	Alexander Butko	18 March 1986 (aged 27)
13	Dmitriy Muserskiy	29 October 1988 (aged 24)
14	Artem Volvich	22 January 1990 (aged 23)
15	Dmitriy Ilinykh	31 January 1987 (aged 26)
16	Aleksey Verbov	31 January 1982 (aged 31)
17	Maxim Mikhaylov	19 March 1988 (aged 25)
18	Alexander Volkov	14 February 1985 (aged 28)
19	Maxim Zhigalov	26 July 1989 (aged 23)
20	Artem Ermakov	6 March 1982 (aged 31)
21	Ilia Zhilin	10 May 1985 (aged 28)
22	Valentin Golubev	3 May 1992 (aged 21)
Coach	Andrey Voronkov

== Serbia ==
#	Name	Birthdate
1	Nikola Kovačević	14 February 1983 (aged 30)
2	Uroš Kovačević	6 May 1993 (aged 20)
3	Marko Ivović	22 December 1990 (aged 22)
4	Nemanja Radović	26 December 1990 (aged 22)
5	Vlado Petković	6 January 1983 (aged 30)
6	Filip Stoilović	11 October 1992 (aged 20)
7	Dragan Stanković (C)	18 October 1985 (aged 27)
8	Filip Vujić	17 October 1989 (aged 23)
9	Nikola Jovović	13 February 1992 (aged 21)
10	Miloš Nikić	31 March 1986 (aged 27)
11	Mihajlo Mitić	17 September 1990 (aged 22)
12	Milan Rašić	2 February 1985 (aged 28)
13	Dušan Petković	27 January 1992 (aged 21)
14	Aleksandar Atanasijević	4 September 1991 (aged 21)
15	Saša Starović	19 October 1988 (aged 24)
16	Aleksa Brdjović	29 July 1993 (aged 19)
17	Nikola Mijailović	8 August 1989 (aged 23)
18	Marko Podraščanin	29 August 1987 (aged 25)
19	Nikola Rosić	5 August 1984 (aged 28)
20	Srećko Lisinać	17 May 1992 (aged 21)
21	Nemanja Petrić	28 July 1987 (aged 25)
22	Milija Mrdak	26 October 1991 (aged 21)
Coach	Igor Kolaković

== South Korea ==
#	Name	Birthdate
1	Jeon Kwang-In	18 September 1991 (aged 21)
2	Han Sun-Soo	16 December 1985 (aged 27)
3	Kwon Young-Min	5 July 1980 (aged 32)
4	Moon Sung-Min	14 September 1986 (aged 26)
5	Yeo Oh-Hyun	2 September 1978 (aged 34)
6	Lee Min-Gyu	3 December 1992 (aged 20)
7	Lee Sun-Kyu (C)	14 March 1981 (aged 32)
8	Ji Tae-Hwan	5 June 1986 (aged 26)
9	Kwak Seung-Suk	23 March 1988 (aged 25)
10	Yoo Yoon-Sik	2 February 1989 (aged 24)
11	Park Chul-Woo	25 July 1985 (aged 27)
12	Choi Min-ho	28 April 1988 (aged 25)
13	Bu Yong-Chan	30 November 1989 (aged 23)
14	Seo Jae-Duck	21 July 1989 (aged 23)
15	Park Sang-Ha	4 April 1986 (aged 27)
16	Kim Jeong-Hwan	23 March 1988 (aged 25)
17	Ha Kyoung-Min	27 July 1982 (aged 30)
18	Shin Yung-Suk	4 October 1986 (aged 26)
19	Lee Kang-Joo	30 June 1983 (aged 29)
20	Kim Gwang-Guk	13 August 1987 (aged 25)
21	Song Myung-Geun	12 March 1993 (aged 20)
22	Lee Kang-won	5 May 1990 (aged 23)
Coach	Park Ki-Won

== United States ==
#	Name	Birthdate
1	Matthew Anderson	18 April 1987 (aged 26)
2	Jeffrey Menzel	31 October 1988 (aged 24)
3	Evan Patak	23 June 1984 (aged 28)
4	David Lee	8 March 1982 (aged 31)
5	Richard Lambourne	6 May 1975 (aged 38)
6	Paul Lotman	3 November 1985 (aged 27)
7	Kawika Shoji	11 November 1987 (aged 25)
8	Kyle Caldwell	15 March 1990 (aged 23)
9	Murphy Troy	31 May 1989 (aged 24)
10	Antonio Ciarelli	13 April 1990 (aged 23)
11	Brian Thornton	22 April 1985 (aged 28)
12	Russell Holmes	1 July 1982 (aged 30)
13	Matthew Rawson	29 October 1986 (aged 26)
14	Ryan Ammerman	30 December 1985 (aged 27)
15	Carson Clark	20 January 1989 (aged 24)
16	Jayson Jablonsky	23 July 1985 (aged 27)
17	Maxwell Holt	12 March 1987 (aged 26)
18	Garrett Muagututia	26 February 1988 (aged 25)
19	Alfredo Reft	15 December 1982 (aged 30)
20	David Smith	15 May 1985 (aged 28)
21	Bradley Lawson	2 August 1989 (aged 23)
22	Erik Shoji (L)	24 August 1989 (aged 23)
Coach	John Speraw
