= Volleyball at the 2015 European Games – Men's team rosters =

This article shows the rosters of all participating teams at the 2015 European Games – Men's tournament in Azerbaijan.

== Azerbaijan ==
No.	Name	Date of birth	2015 club
Coach	Bülent Karslıoğlu		
1	Vugar Bayramov	21 January 1992	(Azerbaijan) Azerneft Baku
2	Tural Hasanli	25 May 1993	(Azerbaijan) Azerneft Baku
3	Javid Suleymanov	26 February 1989	(Azerbaijan) Azerneft Baku
5	Vadim Kutukov	17 December 1986	(Azerbaijan) Azerneft Baku
6	Elmin Alishanov	5 October 1990	(Azerbaijan) VK Masalli
7	Emil Abdullayev	3 January 1983	(Azerbaijan) Azerneft Baku
8	Yevgeniy Kovalenko	12 February 1982	(Azerbaijan) Azerneft Baku
9	Pərviz Səmədov	28 January 1986	(Azerbaijan) Azerneft Baku
10	Dmitriy Obodnikov	30 August 1987	(Azerbaijan) Azerneft Baku
11	Asif Əliyev	27 July 1989	(Azerbaijan) Neftçi Baku
12	Farid Jalalov	4 February 1987	(Azerbaijan) Azerneft Baku
13	Aleksey Chervyakov	13 February 1984	(Azerbaijan) Azerneft Baku
14	Rasul Ibragimov	1 February 1988	(Azerbaijan) Univer VK
19	Kanan Allahverdiyev	15 September 1990	(Azerbaijan) Azerneft Baku

== Belgium ==
No.	Name	Date of birth	2015 club
Coach	Kris Tanghe	6 January 1973	
1	Lou Kindt	25 May 1997	(Belgium) VBS Vilvoorde
2	François Lecat	19 April 1993	(Belgium) Noliko Maaseik
3	Berre Peters	22 May 2000	
4	Robbe Vandeweyer	6 July 1995	(Belgium) Brabo Antwerpen
5	Yves Kruyner	10 May 1990	(Belgium) Argex Duvel Puurs
7	Simon Peeters	28 April 1997	
9	Dries Heyrman	30 January 1991	(Belgium) VC Asse-Lennik
10	Niels Huysegoms	11 April 1993	(Belgium) Haasrode Lovanio
17	Tomas Rousseaux	31 March 1994	(Belgium) VT Roeselare
19	Jolan Cox	12 July 1991	(Belgium) Volley Club Menen
20	Lowie Stuer	24 October 1995	(Belgium) Brabo Antwerpen
21	Sander Depovere	8 January 1995	(Belgium) Brabo Antwerpen
22	Arno Van De Velde	30 December 1995	(Belgium) VT Roeselare

== Bulgaria ==
The following is the Bulgarian roster in the 2015 European Games.

Head coach: Nikolay Jeliazkov

No.	Name	Date of birth	Height	Weight	Spike	Block	2015 club
1	Georgi Bratoev	21 October 1987	2.03 m (6 ft 8 in)	96 kg (212 lb)	340 cm (130 in)	325 cm (128 in)	(Ukraine) Lokomotyv Kharkiv
3	Rozalin Penchev	11 December 1994	1.97 m (6 ft 6 in)	79 kg (174 lb)	338 cm (133 in)	325 cm (128 in)	(Poland) Effector Kielce
4	Martin Bozhilov	11 April 1988	1.90 m (6 ft 3 in)	82 kg (181 lb)	320 cm (130 in)	305 cm (120 in)	(Bulgaria) Marek Union-Ivkoni
5	Svetoslav Gotsev	31 August 1990	2.02 m (6 ft 8 in)	93 kg (205 lb)	345 cm (136 in)	335 cm (132 in)	(Italy) Volley Milano
6	Velizar Chernokozhev	23 April 1995	2.08 m (6 ft 10 in)	98 kg (216 lb)	340 cm (130 in)	330 cm (130 in)	(Bulgaria) Levski Volley
7	Branimir Grozdanov	21 May 1994	1.98 m (6 ft 6 in)	88 kg (194 lb)	338 cm (133 in)	327 cm (129 in)	(Belgium) Noliko Maaseik
9	Dobromir Dimitrov	7 July 1991	1.98 m (6 ft 6 in)	84 kg (185 lb)	340 cm (130 in)	330 cm (130 in)	(Romania) CSM București
10	Valentin Bratoev	21 October 1987	2.03 m (6 ft 8 in)	92 kg (203 lb)	347 cm (137 in)	338 cm (133 in)	(France) GFC Ajaccio
12	Jani Jeliazkov	15 September 1992	2.07 m (6 ft 9 in)	91 kg (201 lb)	345 cm (136 in)	335 cm (132 in)	(Italy) Ravenna
15	Todor Aleksiev (C)	21 April 1983	2.04 m (6 ft 8 in)	105 kg (231 lb)	355 cm (140 in)	340 cm (130 in)	(Russia) Gazprom-Ugra Surgut
18	Nikolay Nikolov	29 July 1986	2.09 m (6 ft 10 in)	97 kg (214 lb)	350 cm (140 in)	332 cm (131 in)	(Iran) Shahrdari Urmia
20	Borislav Apostolov	7 December 1990	2.08 m (6 ft 10 in)	102 kg (225 lb)	350 cm (140 in)	340 cm (130 in)	(Bulgaria) Marek Union-Ivkoni
21	Ventsislav Ragin	8 April 1992	2.00 m (6 ft 7 in)	91 kg (201 lb)	340 cm (130 in)	330 cm (130 in)	(Bulgaria) Dobrudja Dobrich
22	Petar Karakashev	11 February 1991	1.85 m (6 ft 1 in)	75 kg (165 lb)	325 cm (128 in)	315 cm (124 in)	(Bulgaria) Pirin Razlog

== Finland ==
Head coach: (Finland) Lauri Hakala

#	Name	Date of birth	Height	Weight	Spike	Block	Club
1	Akseli Lankinen	31 August 1997	1.93 m (6 ft 4 in)	75 kg (165 lb)	330 cm (130 in)	315 cm (124 in)	(Finland) Kuortaneen Lentopallo
2	Petteri Penttinen	21 August 1985	1.85 m (6 ft 1 in)	85 kg (187 lb)	325 cm (128 in)	315 cm (124 in)	(Finland) LEKA Volley
3	Tuomas Koppanen	4 October 1993	1.97 m (6 ft 6 in)	85 kg (187 lb)	346 cm (136 in)	324 cm (128 in)	(Finland) Hurrikaani Loimaa
4	Aleksi Mutka	23 March 1995	1.82 m (6 ft 0 in)	68 kg (150 lb)	315 cm (124 in)	300 cm (120 in)	(Finland) Tampereen Isku-Volley
5	Toni Kankaanpää (C)	18 March 1984	1.94 m (6 ft 4 in)	90 kg (200 lb)	342 cm (135 in)	318 cm (125 in)	(Finland) Korson Veto
6	Lauri Jylhä	2 August 1996	1.94 m (6 ft 4 in)	82 kg (181 lb)	348 cm (137 in)	325 cm (128 in)	(Finland) Kokkolan Tiikerit
7	Ossi Rumpunen	18 April 1989	1.88 m (6 ft 2 in)	87 kg (192 lb)	337 cm (133 in)	315 cm (124 in)	(Finland) Raision Loimu
9	Antti Leppälä	8 May 1992	1.95 m (6 ft 5 in)	94 kg (207 lb)	344 cm (135 in)	320 cm (130 in)	(Finland) Kokkolan Tiikerit
10	Antti Vallin	5 April 1994	2.06 m (6 ft 9 in)	103 kg (227 lb)	354 cm (139 in)	328 cm (129 in)	(Finland) Korson Veto
11	Markus Kaurto	31 August 1993	1.95 m (6 ft 5 in)	88 kg (194 lb)	345 cm (136 in)	322 cm (127 in)	(Finland) Perungan Pojat
12	Joni Savimäki	28 January 1991	1.91 m (6 ft 3 in)	90 kg (200 lb)	345 cm (136 in)	325 cm (128 in)	(Finland) Pohjois-Karjalan Liiga-Riento
14	Karl Külaots	28 December 1993	1.97 m (6 ft 6 in)	84 kg (185 lb)	345 cm (136 in)	320 cm (130 in)	(Finland) Korson Veto

== France ==
No.	Name	Date of birth	2015 club
Coach	Marc Francastel	9 April 1963	(France) CNVB
1	Quentin Jouffroy	5 July 1993	(France) ASUL Lione
2	Nicolas Gardien	12 June 1989	(France) Tours Volley-Ball
3	Jonas Aguenier	28 April 1992	(France) AS Cannes
4	Toafa Takaniko	29 May 1985	(France) Tours Volley-Ball
5	Philippe Tuitoga	18 December 1990	(France) Spacer's Tolosa
6	Baptiste Geiler	12 March 1987	(Germany) VfB Friedrichshafen
7	Faipule Kolokilagi	22 September 1994	(France) Chaumont VB
8	Jhon Wendt	15 January 1994	(France) Narbona Volley
9	Guillaume Quesque	29 April 1989	(France) Jastrzębski Węgiel
10	Trévor Clévenot	28 June 1994	(France) Spacer's Tolosa
11	Raphaël Corre	21 November 1989	(France) Nizza VB
13	Steve Peironet	20 May 1985	(France) Beauvais Oise UC
14	Nicolas Rossard	23 May 1990	(France) Arago de Sète
15	Yacine Louati	4 March 1992	(Belgium) Volley Club Menen

== Germany ==
The following is the German roster in the 2015 European Games.

Head coach: Vital Heynen

No.	Name	Date of birth	Height	Weight	Spike	Block	2015 club
1	Christian Fromm	15 August 1990	2.04 m (6 ft 8 in)	107 kg (236 lb)	345 cm (136 in)	324 cm (128 in)	(Italy) Sir Safety Perugia
5	Sebastian Kühner	15 March 1987	2.03 m (6 ft 8 in)	95 kg (209 lb)	341 cm (134 in)	332 cm (131 in)	(Germany) SCC Berlin
6	Denys Kaliberda	24 June 1990	1.93 m (6 ft 4 in)	95 kg (209 lb)	343 cm (135 in)	314 cm (124 in)	(Poland) Jastrzębski Węgiel
8	Marcus Böhme	25 August 1985	2.11 m (6 ft 11 in)	115 kg (254 lb)	360 cm (140 in)	330 cm (130 in)	(Turkey) Fenerbahçe
10	Jochen Schöps (C)	8 October 1983	2.00 m (6 ft 7 in)	102 kg (225 lb)	360 cm (140 in)	335 cm (132 in)	(Poland) Asseco Resovia Rzeszów
11	Lukas Kampa	29 November 1986	1.96 m (6 ft 5 in)	90 kg (200 lb)	335 cm (132 in)	320 cm (130 in)	(Poland) Cerrad Czarni Radom
12	Ferdinand Tille	8 December 1988	1.85 m (6 ft 1 in)	76 kg (168 lb)	338 cm (133 in)	316 cm (124 in)	(Poland) PGE Skra Bełchatów
14	Tom Strohbach	27 May 1992	1.96 m (6 ft 5 in)	87 kg (192 lb)	338 cm (133 in)	329 cm (130 in)	(Germany) SCC Berlin
15	Tim Broshog	2 December 1987	2.05 m (6 ft 9 in)	112 kg (247 lb)	340 cm (130 in)	332 cm (131 in)	(Belgium) Noliko Maaseik
17	Jan Zimmermann	12 February 1993	1.90 m (6 ft 3 in)	82 kg (181 lb)	340 cm (130 in)	312 cm (123 in)	(Germany) VfB Friedrichshafen
18	Michael Andrei	6 August 1985	2.10 m (6 ft 11 in)	101 kg (223 lb)	345 cm (136 in)	340 cm (130 in)	(Belgium) Topvolley Antwerpen
18	Björn Höhne	27 March 1991	1.92 m (6 ft 4 in)	92 kg (203 lb)	345 cm (136 in)	330 cm (130 in)	(Belgium) Noliko Maaseik
20	Matthias Pompe	15 February 1984	1.98 m (6 ft 6 in)	94 kg (207 lb)	345 cm (136 in)	325 cm (128 in)	(Germany) SWD Powervolleys Düren
22	Falko Steinke	26 March 1985	2.05 m (6 ft 9 in)	95 kg (209 lb)	360 cm (140 in)	345 cm (136 in)	(Germany) SVG Lüneburg

== Italy ==
No.	Name	Date of birth	2015 club
Coach	Michele Totire	12 February 1976	(Italy) Club Italia
1	Thomas Beretta	18 April 1990	(Italy) Sir Safety Perugia
2	Gabriele Nelli	4 December 1993	(Italy) Trentino Volley
3	Nicola Pesaresi	11 February 1991	(Italy) Blu Volley Verona
5	Marco Falaschi	18 September 1987	(Italy) Trefl Danzica
6	Luca Spirito	30 October 1997	(Italy) Pallavolo Molfetta
7	Alessandro Preti	7 August 1992	(Italy) Power Volley Milano
8	Giacomo Raffaelli	7 February 1995	(Italy) Club Italia
9	Jacopo Massari	2 June 1988	(Italy) Pallavolo Piacenza
10	Tiziano Mazzone	22 July 1995	(Italy) Trentino Volley
11	Andrea Galliani	6 January 1988	(Italy) Volley Milano
12	Fabio Ricci	11 July 1994	(Italy) PRC Ravenna
13	Elia Bossi	15 August 1994	(Italy) Pallavolo Molfetta

== Poland ==
The following is the Polish roster in the 2015 European Games.

Head coach: Andrzej Kowal

No.	Name	Date of birth	Height	Weight	Spike	Block	2015 club
1	Dawid Dryja	21 July 1992	2.01 m (6 ft 7 in)	96 kg (212 lb)	340 cm (130 in)	320 cm (130 in)	(Poland) Asseco Resovia Rzeszów
2	Jan Nowakowski	17 May 1994	2.02 m (6 ft 8 in)	100 kg (220 lb)	352 cm (139 in)	335 cm (132 in)	(Poland) Transfer Bydgoszcz
3	Michał Kędzierski	9 August 1994	1.95 m (6 ft 5 in)	87 kg (192 lb)	330 cm (130 in)	310 cm (120 in)	(Poland) Cerrad Czarni Radom
4	Grzegorz Kosok	2 March 1986	2.05 m (6 ft 9 in)	95 kg (209 lb)	360 cm (140 in)	330 cm (130 in)	(Poland) Jastrzębski Węgiel
5	Wojciech Ferens	5 April 1991	1.94 m (6 ft 4 in)	95 kg (209 lb)	351 cm (138 in)	320 cm (130 in)	(Poland) BBTS Bielsko-Biała
6	Dawid Konarski	31 August 1989	1.98 m (6 ft 6 in)	101 kg (223 lb)	355 cm (140 in)	330 cm (130 in)	(Poland) Asseco Resovia Rzeszów
9	Adam Kowalski	16 September 1994	1.80 m (5 ft 11 in)	73 kg (161 lb)	325 cm (128 in)	300 cm (120 in)	(Poland) Cerrad Czarni Radom
10	Szymon Romać	1 October 1992	1.96 m (6 ft 5 in)	95 kg (209 lb)	350 cm (140 in)	330 cm (130 in)	(Poland) MKS Cuprum Lubin
11	Aleksander Śliwka	24 May 1995	1.96 m (6 ft 5 in)	87 kg (192 lb)	341 cm (134 in)	325 cm (128 in)	(Poland) AZS Politechnika Warszawska
12	Paweł Woicki (C)	29 June 1983	1.83 m (6 ft 0 in)	82 kg (181 lb)	315 cm (124 in)	305 cm (120 in)	(Poland) Transfer Bydgoszcz
13	Adrian Buchowski	30 September 1991	1.94 m (6 ft 4 in)	90 kg (200 lb)	345 cm (136 in)	325 cm (128 in)	(Poland) Effector Kielce
16	Bartłomiej Grzechnik	8 February 1993	2.00 m (6 ft 7 in)	92 kg (203 lb)	345 cm (136 in)	320 cm (130 in)	(Poland) Cerrad Czarni Radom
17	Artur Szalpuk	20 March 1995	2.02 m (6 ft 8 in)	92 kg (203 lb)	348 cm (137 in)	325 cm (128 in)	(Poland) AZS Politechnika Warszawska
18	Damian Wojtaszek	7 September 1988	1.80 m (5 ft 11 in)	80 kg (180 lb)	315 cm (124 in)	305 cm (120 in)	(Poland) Jastrzębski Węgiel

== Russia ==
The following is the Russian roster in the 2015 European Games.

Head coach: Sergey Shlyapnikov

No.	Name	Date of birth	Height	Weight	Spike	Block	2015 club
2	Ilia Vlasov	3 August 1995	2.10 m (6 ft 11 in)	100 kg (220 lb)	370 cm (150 in)	360 cm (140 in)	(Russia) Fakel Novy Urengoy
3	Dmitry Kovalyov (C)	15 March 1991	1.98 m (6 ft 6 in)	84 kg (185 lb)	350 cm (140 in)	340 cm (130 in)	(Russia) Gubernia
4	Ivan Demakov	6 January 1993	2.09 m (6 ft 10 in)	100 kg (220 lb)	360 cm (140 in)	350 cm (140 in)	(Russia) Zenit-Kazan
9	Igor Kobzar	13 April 1991	1.96 m (6 ft 5 in)	82 kg (181 lb)	350 cm (140 in)	340 cm (130 in)	(Russia) Zenit-Kazan
10	Aleksandr Markin	28 July 1990	1.97 m (6 ft 6 in)	86 kg (190 lb)	340 cm (130 in)	350 cm (140 in)	(Russia) Dynamo Moscow
11	Igor Filippov	19 March 1991	2.08 m (6 ft 10 in)	100 kg (220 lb)	350 cm (140 in)	340 cm (130 in)	(Russia) Dynamo Moscow
12	Aleksey Kabeshov	22 June 1991	1.86 m (6 ft 1 in)	80 kg (180 lb)	330 cm (130 in)	320 cm (130 in)	(Russia) Gazprom-Ugra Surgut
14	Alexander Kimerov	11 September 1996	2.12 m (6 ft 11 in)	105 kg (231 lb)	370 cm (150 in)	360 cm (140 in)	(Russia) Dynamo Moscow
15	Dmitry Volkov	25 May 1995	2.00 m (6 ft 7 in)	86 kg (190 lb)	360 cm (140 in)	350 cm (140 in)	(Russia) Fakel Novy Urengoy
16	Viktor Poletaev	27 July 1995	1.97 m (6 ft 6 in)	87 kg (192 lb)	370 cm (150 in)	350 cm (140 in)	(Russia) Zenit-Kazan
17	Maksim Zhigalov	26 July 1989	2.03 m (6 ft 8 in)	88 kg (194 lb)	360 cm (140 in)	350 cm (140 in)	(Russia) Belogorie
18	Egor Kliuka	15 June 1995	2.04 m (6 ft 8 in)	100 kg (220 lb)	360 cm (140 in)	350 cm (140 in)	(Russia) Fakel Novy Urengoy
19	Sergey Nikitin	6 April 1993	1.96 m (6 ft 5 in)	83 kg (183 lb)	350 cm (140 in)	340 cm (130 in)	(Russia) Prikamye Perm
21	Roman Bragin	17 April 1987	1.87 m (6 ft 2 in)	87 kg (192 lb)	330 cm (130 in)	320 cm (130 in)	(Russia) Belogorie

== Serbia ==
No.	Name	Date of birth	2015 club
Coach	Siniša Reljić	23 February 1970	
1	Goran Škundrić	23 November 1987	(Serbia) Ribnica Kraljevo
2	Maksim Buculjević	20 September 1991	(Serbia) OK Crvena Zvezda
4	Lazar Koprivica	8 November 1991	(Serbia) OK Crvena Zvezda
6	Filip Stoilović	11 October 1992	(Serbia) OK Crvena Zvezda
7	Dušan Lopar	8 February 1991	(Serbia) OK Partizan
10	Konstantin Čupković	2 January 1987	(Poland) Łuczniczka Bydgoszcz
11	Mihajlo Mitić	17 September 1990	(France) Chaumont Volley-Ball 52
12	Milan Rašić	2 February 1985	(France) AS Cannes
13	Dušan Petković	27 January 1992	(France) AS Cannes
16	Dražen Luburić	2 October 1993	(Serbia) OK Vojvodina
18	Milorad Kapur	5 March 1991	(Serbia) OK Novi Pazar
19	Marko Nikolić	22 June 1991	(Serbia) OK Partizan
21	Petar Krsmanović	1 June 1990	(Montenegro) Budvanska Rivijera Budva
22	Dejan Radić	6 November 1984	(France) AS Cannes

== Slovakia ==
No.	Name	Date of birth	2015 club
Coach	Miroslav Palgut	16 May 1965	
1	Ľuboš Macko	7 June 1989	(Slovakia) VK Prešov
2	Tomáš Kriško	19 December 1988	(Czech Republic) Dukla Liberec
3	Radoslav Presinsky	14 January 1989	(Slovakia) VK Prievidza
6	Daniel Končál	16 September 1982	(France) Asnières Volley
7	Boris Kempa	25 May 1991	(Kazakhstan) VC Pavlodar
9	Peter Mlynarčík	29 November 1991	(Slovakia) VKC Humenné
10	Marcel Lux	27 July 1994	(Slovakia) VK Prešov
11	Martin Vydarený	26 July 1994	(Slovakia) VO TJ Spartak Myjava
13	Štefan Chrtianský	14 August 1989	(Austria) Tirol Innsbruck
15	Juraj Zaťko	5 June 1987	(Poland) AZS UWM Olsztyn
17	Tomáš Halanda	25 April 1992	(Slovakia) VK Prievidza
19	Michal Hruška	13 March 1987	(Austria) SK Aich/Dob
20	Peter Ondrovič	28 March 1995	(Slovakia) COP Volley Trenčín

== Turkey ==
No.	Name	Date of birth	2015 club
Coach	Alper Hamurcu	25 November 1983	(Turkey) Eczacıbaşı Istanbul
1	Caner Pekşen	9 June 1987	(Turkey) İstanbul BB
3	Ahmet Toçoğlu	13 March 1980	(Turkey) İstanbul BB
6	Burak Mert	23 October 1990	(Turkey) İstanbul BB
7	Vahit Savaş	7 March 1995	(Turkey) Ziraat Bankası S.K.
8	Burutay Subaşı	15 July 1990	(Turkey) Halkbank Ankara
9	Ediz Fırıncıoğlu	20 November 1993	(Turkey) Fenerbahçe SK
10	Selçuk Keskin	15 January 1982	(Turkey) Galatasaray SK
11	İbrahim Emet	15 January 1986	(Turkey) Galatasaray SK
12	İzzet Ünver	1 January 1992	(Turkey) Fenerbahçe SK
14	Abdullah Çam	30 March 1997	(Turkey) Halkbank Ankara
16	Ufuk Minici	20 January 1991	(Turkey) Arkas Izmir
17	Ahmet Karataş	31 March 1991	(Turkey) Beşiktaş JK
19	Yiğit Gülmezoğlu	28 December 1995	(Turkey) Arkas Izmir
22	Mustafa Koç	23 February 1992	(Turkey) Arkas Izmir
