= Bulgaria at the European Games =

- IOC code: BUL
- NOC: Bulgarian Olympic Committee
- Website: www.bgolympic.org
- Medals: Gold 7 Silver 15 Bronze 18 Total 40

European Games appearances (overview)
- 2015; 2019; 2023; 2027

Bulgaria participated at the inaugural edition of the European Games in 2015.

== Medal tables ==
=== Medals by Games ===
Games	Athletes	Gold	Silver	Bronze	Total	Rank
(Azerbaijan) 2015 Baku	127	1	4	5	10	26
(Belarus) 2019 Minsk	86	3	7	8	18	16
(Poland) 2023 Kraków-Małopolska	113	3	4	5	12	23
(Turkey) 2027 Istanbul	Future event					
Total		7	15	18	40	25

=== Medals by sports ===
Sport	Gold	Silver	Bronze	Total
Boxing	3	2	2	7
Badminton	2	0	1	3
Sambo	1	1	2	4
Karate	1	1	0	2
Gymnastics	0	4	2	6
Wrestling	0	2	5	7
Shooting	0	2	3	5
Kickboxing	0	1	2	3
Judo	0	1	0	1
Volleyball	0	1	0	1
Taekwondo	0	0	1	1
Totals (11 entries)	7	15	18	40

== List of medallists ==
Medal	Name(s)	Games	Sport	Event
Gold	Gabriela Stoeva; Stefani Stoeva	(Azerbaijan) 2015 Baku	Badminton	Women's doubles
Silver	Elitsa Yankova	(Azerbaijan) 2015 Baku	Wrestling	Women's freestyle 48 kg
Silver	Antoaneta Boneva	(Azerbaijan) 2015 Baku	Shooting	Women's 25 metre pistol
Silver	Kalina Stefanova	(Azerbaijan) 2015 Baku	Sambo	Women's 60 kg
Silver	Men's national volleyball team: Georgi Bratoev Rozalin Penchev Martin Bozhilov Svetoslav Gotsev Velizar Chernokozhev Branimir Grozdanov Dobromir Dimitrov Valentin Bratoev Jani Jeliazkov Todor Aleksiev (captain) Nikolay Nikolov Borislav Apostolov Ventsislav Ragin Petar Karakashev	(Azerbaijan) 2015 Baku	Volleyball	Men's tournament
Bronze	Daniel Aleksandrov	(Azerbaijan) 2015 Baku	Wrestling	Men's Greco-Roman 80 kg
Bronze	Evelina Nikolova	(Azerbaijan) 2015 Baku	Wrestling	Women's freestyle 55 kg
Bronze	Taybe Yusein	(Azerbaijan) 2015 Baku	Wrestling	Women's freestyle 60 kg
Bronze	Magdalena Varbanova	(Azerbaijan) 2015 Baku	Sambo	Women's 52 kg
Bronze	Petya Nedelcheva	(Azerbaijan) 2015 Baku	Badminton	Women's singles

== See also ==
- Bulgaria at the Olympics
