= Bulgaria at the 2015 European Games =

- IOC code: BUL
- NOC: Bulgarian Olympic Committee
- Website: www.bgolympic.org

in Baku, Azerbaijan 12 – 28 June 2015
- Competitors: 127 in 19 sports
- Flag bearer: Maria Grozdeva
- Medals Ranked 27th: Gold 1 Silver 4 Bronze 5 Total 10

European Games appearances (overview)
- 2015; 2019; 2023; 2027

Bulgaria competed at the 2015 European Games, in Baku, Azerbaijan from 12 to 28 June 2015.

== Medalists ==
Medal	Name	Sport	Event	Date
Gold	Gabriela Stoeva; Stefani Stoeva	Badminton	Women's doubles	27 June
Silver	Elitsa Yankova	Wrestling	Women's freestyle 48 kg	15 June
Silver	Antoaneta Boneva	Shooting	Women's 25 metre pistol	20 June
Silver	Kalina Stefanova	Sambo	Women's 60 kg	22 June
Silver	Georgi Bratoev; Rozalin Penchev; Martin Bozhilov; Svetoslav Gotsev; Velizar Chernokozhev; Branimir Grozdanov; Dobromir Dimitrov; Valentin Bratoev; Jani Jeliazkov; Todor Aleksiev (captain); Nikolay Nikolov; Borislav Apostolov; Ventsislav Ragin; Petar Karakashev	Volleyball	Men's tournament	28 June
Bronze	Daniel Aleksandrov	Wrestling	Men's Greco-Roman 80 kg	13 June
Bronze	Evelina Nikolova	Wrestling	Women's freestyle 55 kg	15 June
Bronze	Taybe Yusein	Wrestling	Women's freestyle 60 kg	15 June
Bronze	Magdalena Varbanova	Sambo	Women's 52 kg	22 June
Bronze	Petya Nedelcheva	Badminton	Women's singles	27 June

== Archery ==
Athlete	Event	Ranking round		Round of 64	Round of 32	Round of 16	Quarterfinals	Semifinals	Final / BM	
Athlete	Event	Score	Seed	Opposition Score	Opposition Score	Opposition Score	Opposition Score	Opposition Score	Opposition Score	Rank
Yavor Hristov	Men's individual	651	35	Nesemann (GER); W 6–2	van den Berg (NED); L 3–7	Did not advance				17
Dobromira Danailova	Women's individual	626	36	Martin (ESP); L 4–6	Did not advance					33
Dobromira Danailova; Yavor Hristov	Mixed team	1277	17	—		Did not advance				18

== Badminton ==
- Men's singles – Blagovest Kisyov
- Women's singles – Linda Zechiri; Petya Nedelcheva (bronze)
- Men's doubles – Liliyan Mihailov and Mihail Mihailov
- Women's doubles – Stefani Stoeva and Gabriela Stoeva (gold)

== Boxing ==
- Men's 49 kg – Tinko Banabakov
- Men's 52 kg – Danail Asenov
- Men's 56 kg – Stefan Ivanov
- Men's 60 kg – Elian Dimitrov
- Men's 64 kg – Ayrin Ismetov
- Men's 69 kg – Simeon Chamov
- Men's 81 kg – Radoslav Panteleev
- Men's 91 kg – Kristian Dimitrov
- Men's +91 kg – Petar Belberov
- Women's 51 kg – Stoika Petrova
- Women's 54 kg – Stanimira Petrova
- Women's 60 kg – Denica Eliseeva

== Canoe sprint ==
- Men's K1 200m – Miroslav Kirchev
- Men's K1 1000m – Miroslav Kirchev
- Women's K1 500m – Berenike Faldum
- Women's K1 5000m – Berenike Faldum
- Men's K2 200m – Galin Georgiev, Nikolai Milev

== Cycling ==
- Men's road race – Nikolai Mihaylov, Stefan Hristov

== Diving ==
- Men's 1 metre springboard – Dimitar Isaev, Bogomil Koynashki
- Men's 3 metre springboard – Dimitar Isaev, Bogomil Koynashki
- Men's 5, 7.5, 10 metre platform – Dimitar Isaev
- Men's 3 metre synchronized springboard – Dimitar Isaev, Bogomil Koynashki

== Fencing ==
- Men's Épée – Deyan Dobrev
- Men's Sabre – Atanas Arnaudov

== Gymnastics ==
=== Acrobatic ===
- Mixed pairs – Aleks Jekov, Elena Velikova

=== Artistic ===
- Women's – Ralica Mileva, Albena Zlatkova, Valentina Rashkova
- Men's – Aleksandar Batinkov, Martin Angelov, Jordan Aleksandrov

=== Rhythmic ===
Bulgaria has qualified one athlete after the performance at the 2013 Rhythmic Gymnastics European Championships.

- Individual – Maria Mateva, Nevyana Vladinova
- Groups – Mihaela Maevska, Reneta Kamberova, Cvetelina Naidenova, Cvetelina Stoyanova, Hristiana Todorova

=== Trampoline ===
Bulgaria qualified two athletes based on the results at the 2014 European Trampoline Championships.

- Women's individual – Valeria Jordanova, Simona Ivanova
- Women's synchronized – Valeria Jordanova, Simona Ivanova

== Judo ==
- Men's 60 kg – Yanislav Gerchev
- Men's 81 kg – Ivailo Ivanov
- Women's 57 kg – Ivelina Ilieva

== Karate ==
- Women's 68 kg – Borislava Ganeva

== Sambo ==
- Men's 57 kg – Borislav Yanakov
- Men's 74 kg – Martin Ivanov
- Women's 52 kg – Magdalena Varbanova
- Women's 60 kg – Kalina Stefanova
- Women's 64 kg – Vanya Ivanova
- Women's 68 kg – Gabriela Gigova

== Shooting ==
- Men's 10 metre air pistol – Samuil Donkov
- Men's 50 metre pistol – Samuil Donkov
- Men's 50 metre rifle three positions – Anton Rizov
- Men's rifle prone – Anton Rizov
- Women's 10 metre air pistol – Maria Grozdeva, Antoaneta Boneva
- Women's 25 metre pistol – Maria Grozdeva, Antoaneta Boneva
- Mixed air 50 metre pistol – Samuil Donkov, Antoaneta Boneva

== Swimming ==
- Men's 50 metre breaststroke – Matyu Cenkov
- Men's 100 metre breaststroke – Matyu Cenkov
- Men's 200 metre breaststroke – Matyu Cenkov
- Men's 200 metre individual medley – Kaloyan Nikolov
- Men's 400 metre individual medley – Kaloyan Nikolov
- Women's 50 metre freestyle – Diana Petkova
- Women's 100 metre freestyle – Diana Petkova
- Women's 50 metre backstroke – Boyana Tomova
- Women's 100 metre backstroke – Diana Petkova, Boyana Tomova
- Women's 200 metre backstroke – Boyana Tomova
- Women's 200 metre individual medley – Diana Petkova

== Synchronised swimming ==
- Duet – Mihaela Peeva, Maria Kirkova

== Table tennis ==
Women's singles – Anelia Karova

== Taekwondo ==
- Men's 68 kg – Vladimir Dalakliev
- Men's 80 kg – Teodor Georgiev

== Triathlon ==
- Men's triathlon – Emil Stoinev
- Women's triathlon – Hrista Stoineva

== Volleyball ==
=== Indoor ===
- Men's – Georgi Bratoev, Rozalin Penchev, Martin Bojilov, Svetoslav Gocev, Danail Milushev, Branimir Grozdanov, Dobromir Dimitrov, Valentin Bratoev, Jani Jelyazkov, Todor Aleksiev, Nikolai Nikolov, Borislav Apostolov, Vencislav Ragin, Petar Karakashiev
- Women's – Diana Nenova, Nasya Dimitrova, Lora Kitipova, Dobryana Rabadjieva, Gabriela Koeva, Gergana Dimitrova, Hristina Ruseva, Miroslava Paskova, Silvana Chausheva, Maria Filipova, Jana Todorova, Elica Vasileva, Mira Todorova, Emiliq Nikolova

=== Beach ===
Women's – Irena Mishonova, Svetla Angelova

== Wrestling ==
=== Men's events ===
==== Freestyle ====
- 57 kg – Vladimir Dubov
- 61 kg – Radoslav Velikov
- 65 kg – Borislav Novachkov
- 70 kg – Miroslav Kirov
- 74 kg – Kiril Terziev
- 86 kg – Georgi Sredkov
- 97 kg – Dragomir Stoichev
- 125 kg – Dimitar Kumchev

==== Greco-Roman ====
- 59 kg – Aleksandar Kostadinov
- 66 kg – Konstantin Stas
- 71 kg – Svilen Kostadinov
- 75 kg – Yavor Yanakiev
- 80 kg – Daniel Aleksandrov
- 85 kg – Nikolai Bairyakov
- 98 kg – Vladislav Metodiev
- 130 kg – Miloslav Metodiev

=== Women's events ===
==== Freestyle ====
- 48 kg – Elica Yankova
- 53 kg – Pepa Dimitrova
- 55 kg – Evelina Nikolova
- 58 kg – Mimi Hristova
- 60 kg – Taibe Yusein
- 63 kg – Elina Vaseva
- 69 kg – Djanan Manolova
- 75 kg – Stanka Zlateva
