= Volleyball at the 2015 European Games =

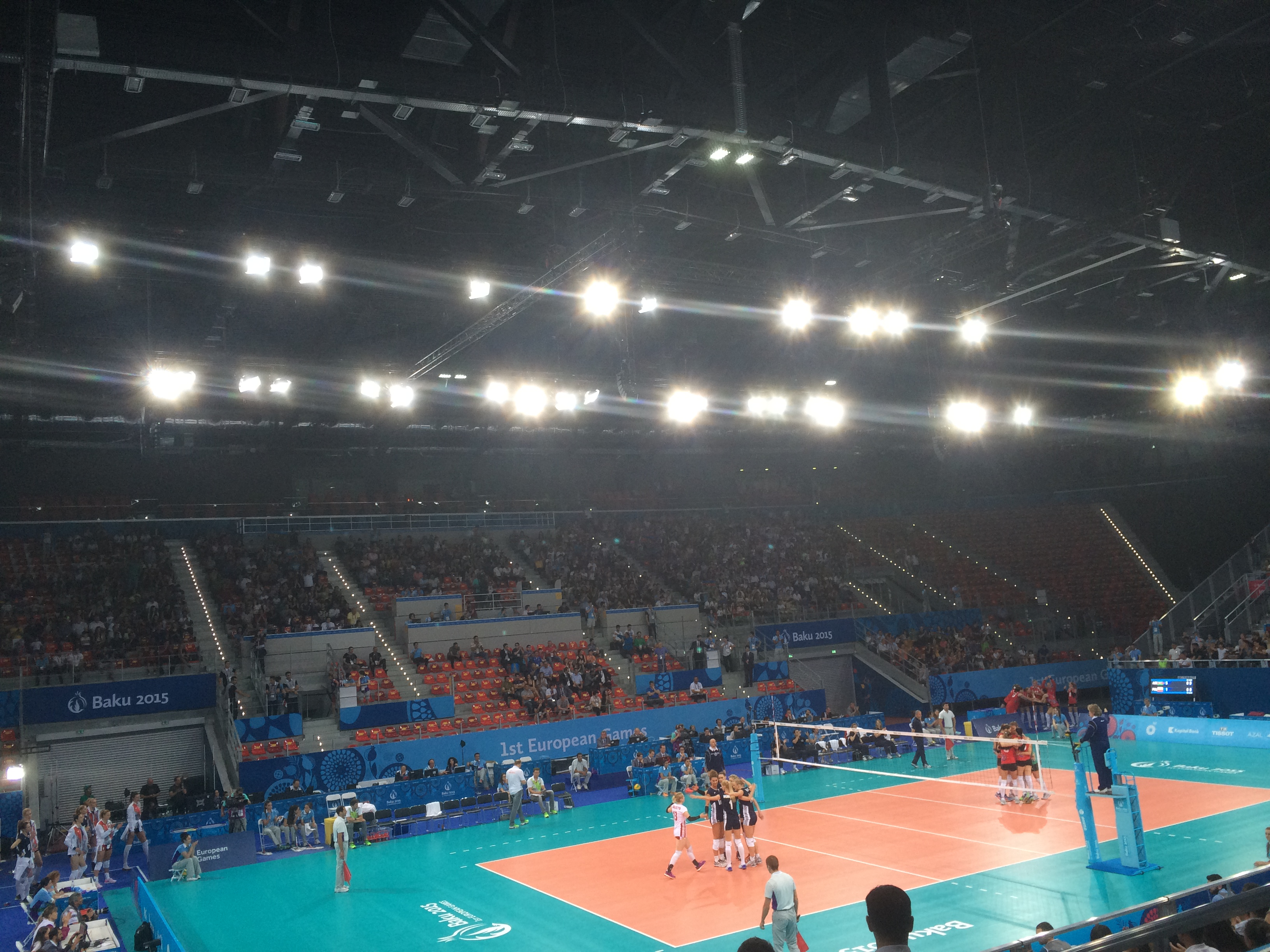
- Volleyball match between Azerbaijan and Poland during European Games
- Venue: Baku Crystal Hall
- Dates: 13–28 June 2015
- Competitors: 464

The volleyball tournaments at the 2015 European Games in Baku were played between 13 and 28 June. 12 teams participated in the two indoor tournaments, while 32 pairs took part in each of the beach volleyball events.

== Qualification ==
=== Indoor volleyball ===
Each event will accept twelve entered teams. Qualification for indoor volleyball for the 2015 European Games is based on European rankings. Those rankings shall be taken on 1 January 2015, and based on the CEV Entry Ranking/Euro league participations. As hosts, Azerbaijan shall be entitled to entry in both indoor events, and nations will be restricted to single team of 14 players in each event.

=== Beach volleyball ===
Each event will accept 32 entered teams. Qualification for beach volleyball will be based on the CEV Beach Volleyball Ranking on 1 January 2015. The top 30 teams in the rankings will be invited to enter, subject to a maximum entry of two teams per nation, while two team places will be reserved in each event for hosts Azerbaijan.

== 2016 Summer Olympics Qualification ==
FIVB has awarded Beach Volleyball the same ranking points as the continental tour masters which will be used for Rio 2016 Olympic Qualification purposes.

== Timetable ==
First version of the competition schedule.

| OC | Opening ceremony | ● | Event competitions | 1 | Event finals | CC | Closing ceremony |

| June | 12th Fri | 13th Sat | 14th Sun | 15th Mon | 16th Tue | 17th Wed | 18th Thu | 19th Fri | 20th Sat | 21st Sun | 22nd Mon | 23rd Tue | 24th Wed | 25th Thu | 26th Fri | 27th Sat | 28th Sun | Events |
|---|---|---|---|---|---|---|---|---|---|---|---|---|---|---|---|---|---|---|
| Volleyball | OC | ● | ● | ● | ● | ● | ● | ● | 1 | 1 | ● | ● | ● | ● | ● | 1 | 1 | 4 |

== Medal summary ==
| Event | Gold | Silver | Bronze |
|---|---|---|---|
| Men's indoor | Germany (GER); Christian Fromm; Sebastian Kühner; Denis Kaliberda; Marcus Böhme; Jochen Schöps (captain); Lukas Kampa; Ferdinand Tille; Tom Strohbach; Tim Broshog; Jan Zimmermann; Michael Andrei; Björn Höhne; Matthias Pompe; Falko Steinke | Bulgaria (BUL); Georgi Bratoev; Rozalin Penchev; Martin Bozhilov; Svetoslav Gotsev; Velizar Chernokozhev; Branimir Grozdanov; Dobromir Dimitrov; Valentin Bratoev; Jani Jeliazkov; Todor Aleksiev (captain); Nikolay Nikolov; Borislav Apostolov; Ventsislav Ragin; Petar Karakashev | Russia (RUS); Ilia Vlasov; Dmitry Kovalev (captain); Ivan Demakov; Igor Kobzar; Alexander Markin; Igor Filippov; Alexey Kabeshov; Alexander Kimerov; Dmitrii Volkov; Victor Poletaev; Maksim Zhigalov; Egor Kliuka; Sergey Nikitin; Roman Bragin |
| Women's indoor | Turkey (TUR); Çağla Akın; Kübra Akman; Seda Aslanyürek; Naz Aydemir; Dicle Nur Babat; Büşra Cansu; Merve Dalbeler; Meliha İsmailoğlu; Aslı Kalaç; Gizem Güreşen Karadayı; Güldeniz Önal Paşalıoğlu (C); Neriman Özsoy; Polen Uslupehlivan; Gözde Yılmaz | Poland (POL); Anna Werblińska; Maja Tokarska; Izabela Bełcik (captain); Agnieszka Kąkolewska; Agnieszka Bednarek-Kasza; Anna Miros; Katarzyna Zaroślińska; Agata Sawicka; Daria Paszek; Sylwia Pycia; Agata Durajczyk; Joanna Wołosz; Natalia Kurnikowska; Katarzyna Skowrońska-Dolata | Serbia (SRB); Maja Savić; Marta Drpa; Bojana Živković; Mina Popović; Tijana Malešević; Brižitka Molnar; Brankica Mihajlović; Jelena Nikolić (captain); Ana Bjelica; Jovana Stevanović; Milena Rašić; Silvija Popović; Slađana Mirković; Bianka Buša |
| Men's beach | Latvia (LAT); Mārtiņš Pļaviņš; Haralds Regža | Russia (RUS); Yaroslav Koshkarev; Dmitri Barsuk | Czech Republic (CZE); Přemysl Kubala; Jan Hadrava |
| Women's beach | Switzerland (SUI); Nicole Eiholzer; Nina Betschart | Austria (AUT); Lena Plesiutschnig; Katharina Schützenhöfer | Lithuania (LTU); Ieva Dumbauskaitė; Monika Povilaitytė |
