= Volleyball at the 2015 European Games – Men's tournament =

2015 European Games
Tournament details
- Host country: Azerbaijan
- Dates: 14 June – 28 June
- Teams: 12
- Venue: 1 (in 1 host city)

Final positions
- Champions: Germany (1st title)

The men's tournament in volleyball at the 2015 European Games in Baku, Azerbaijan was the 1st edition of the event in a European Games. It was held at Baku Crystal Hall from 14 June to 28 June 2015.

== Qualification ==
Means of qualification	Vacancies	Qualified
Host nation	1	Azerbaijan
CEV European Ranking (as of 1 January 2015)	9	Russia; Italy; Serbia; Poland; Bulgaria; Germany; France; Finland; Belgium
CEV European League Ranking List (2011–2014)	2	Slovakia; Turkey
Total	12	

== Pools composition ==
Teams were seeded following the Serpentine system according to their European ranking as of January 1, 2015.

Twelve qualified nations were drawn into two groups, each consisting of six teams. After a robin-round, the four highest-placed teams in each group advanced to a knock-out round to decide the medals.

Pool A	Pool B
Azerbaijan (Host)	Russia (1)
Serbia (3)	Italy (2)
Poland (4)	Bulgaria (5)
France (7)	Germany (6)
Finland (8)	Belgium (9)
Turkey (13)	Slovakia (10)

== Pool standing procedure ==
1. Numbers of matches won
2. Match points
3. Sets ratio
4. Points ratio
5. Result of the last match between the tied teams

Match won 3–0 or 3–1: 3 match points for the winner, 0 match points for the loser
Match won 3–2: 2 match points for the winner, 1 match point for the loser

== Preliminary round ==
- All times are Azerbaijan Summer Time (UTC+05:00).

=== Pool A ===
Pos	Team	Pld	W	L	Pts	SW	SL	SR	SPW	SPL	SPR	Qualification
1	Poland	5	5	0	12	15	6	2.500	464	401	1.157	Quarterfinals
2	France	5	4	1	12	14	5	2.800	431	381	1.131	Quarterfinals
3	Turkey	5	3	2	9	11	9	1.222	449	414	1.085	Quarterfinals
4	Serbia	5	2	3	8	11	9	1.222	430	419	1.026	Quarterfinals
5	Finland	5	1	4	2	3	14	0.214	334	403	0.829	
6	Azerbaijan	5	0	5	2	4	15	0.267	356	446	0.798	

Date	Time		Score		Set 1	Set 2	Set 3	Set 4	Set 5	Total	Report
14 Jun	11:00	Serbia	1–3	Turkey	15–25	25–21	20–25	18–25		78–96	Report
14 Jun	16:30	Azerbaijan	2–3	Finland	25–22	25–21	18–25	18–25	13–15	99–108	Report
14 Jun	22:00	Poland	3–2	France	25–27	25–20	25–20	10–25	15–10	100–102	Report
16 Jun	11:00	Finland	0–3	France	24–26	23–25	23–25			70–76	Report
16 Jun	14:30	Turkey	2–3	Poland	20–25	19–25	30–28	25–22	13–15	107–115	Report
16 Jun	22:00	Azerbaijan	0–3	Serbia	22–25	18–25	19–25			59–75	Report
18 Jun	14:30	Finland	0–3	Turkey	14–25	16–25	13–25			43–75	Report
18 Jun	16:30	Azerbaijan	0–3	France	17–25	16–25	18–25			51–75	Report
18 Jun	22:00	Serbia	2–3	Poland	25–13	25–21	15–25	23–25	9–15	97–99	Report
20 Jun	09:00	France	3–0	Turkey	25–23	25–19	25–16			75–58	Report
20 Jun	14:30	Serbia	3–0	Finland	25–16	28–26	25–20			78–62	Report
20 Jun	20:00	Poland	3–0	Azerbaijan	25–14	25–13	25–17			75–44	Report
22 Jun	09:00	Poland	3–0	Finland	25–21	25–20	25–10			75–51	Report
22 Jun	16:30	France	3–2	Serbia	21–25	17–25	25–23	25–18	15–11	103–102	Report
22 Jun	20:00	Turkey	3–2	Azerbaijan	25–18	25–17	22–25	21–25	20–18	113–103	Report

=== Pool B ===
Pos	Team	Pld	W	L	Pts	SW	SL	SR	SPW	SPL	SPR	Qualification
1	Germany	5	4	1	12	13	3	4.333	391	330	1.185	Quarterfinals
2	Russia	5	4	1	12	13	5	2.600	438	384	1.141	Quarterfinals
3	Bulgaria	5	4	1	11	12	7	1.714	445	406	1.096	Quarterfinals
4	Slovakia	5	2	3	6	7	11	0.636	378	427	0.885	Quarterfinals
5	Belgium	5	1	4	3	6	14	0.429	391	461	0.848	
6	Italy	5	0	5	1	4	15	0.267	421	456	0.923	

Date	Time		Score		Set 1	Set 2	Set 3	Set 4	Set 5	Total	Report
14 Jun	09:00	Slovakia	3–1	Italy	25–23	25–22	22–25	25–21		97–91	Report
14 Jun	14:30	Belgium	2–3	Bulgaria	16–25	25–23	20–25	25–23	11–15	97–111	Report
14 Jun	20:00	Germany	1–3	Russia	20–25	25–20	23–25	21–25		89–95	Report
16 Jun	09:00	Russia	3–0	Belgium	25–18	25–18	25–23			75–59	Report
16 Jun	16:30	Germany	3–0	Slovakia	25–15	25–18	25–23			75–56	Report
16 Jun	20:00	Bulgaria	3–1	Italy	25–21	22–25	34–32	25–19		106–97	Report
18 Jun	09:00	Bulgaria	0–3	Germany	20–25	18–25	22–25			60–75	Report
18 Jun	11:00	Russia	3–1	Slovakia	24–26	25–17	25–18	25–20		99–81	Report
18 Jun	20:00	Italy	2–3	Belgium	24–26	25–16	19–25	25–12	13–15	106–94	Report
20 Jun	11:00	Slovakia	3–1	Belgium	25–22	19–25	25–21	25–19		94–87	Report
20 Jun	16:30	Russia	1–3	Bulgaria	22–25	25–18	23–25	17–25		87–93	Report
20 Jun	22:00	Germany	3–0	Italy	25–18	25–22	27–25			77–65	Report
22 Jun	11:00	Belgium	0–3	Germany	22–25	11–25	21–25			54–75	Report
22 Jun	14:30	Bulgaria	3–0	Slovakia	25–14	25–17	25–19			75–50	Report
22 Jun	22:00	Italy	0–3	Russia	17–25	15–25	30–32			62–82	Report

== Final round ==
- All times are Azerbaijan Summer Time (UTC+05:00).

The teams who rank 1st in each pool played against the teams who rank 4th in the other pool. The 2nd place teams in pool A played against the 2nd or 3rd place teams in the pool B, determined by drawing of lots. The remaining teams played each other.

Quarterfinals
24 June
Poland	3
Slovakia	0
24 June
Turkey	1
Bulgaria	3
24 June
France	0
Russia	3
24 June
Serbia	0
Germany	3

Semifinals
26 June
Poland	2
Bulgaria	3
26 June
Russia	1
Germany	3

Final
28 June
Bulgaria	1
Germany	3
3rd place
28 June
Poland	1
Russia	3

=== Quarterfinals ===
Date	Time		Score		Set 1	Set 2	Set 3	Set 4	Set 5	Total	Report
24 Jun	13:00	Poland	3–0	Slovakia	25–16	25–23	25–19			75–58	Report
24 Jun	15:00	Turkey	1–3	Bulgaria	26–24	19–25	17–25	20–25		82–99	Report
24 Jun	19:00	Serbia	0–3	Germany	24–26	24–26	17–25			65–77	Report
24 Jun	21:00	France	0–3	Russia	23–25	23–25	22–25			68–75	Report

=== Semifinals ===
Date	Time		Score		Set 1	Set 2	Set 3	Set 4	Set 5	Total	Report
26 Jun	17:00	Poland	2–3	Bulgaria	14–25	25–19	22–25	25–23	13–15	99–107	Report
26 Jun	19:30	Russia	1–3	Germany	17–25	25–18	18–25	18–25		78–93	Report

=== Third Place ===
Date	Time		Score		Set 1	Set 2	Set 3	Set 4	Set 5	Total	Report
28 Jun	10:30	Poland	1–3	Russia	24–26	25–23	23–25	23–25		95–99	Report

=== Final ===
Date	Time		Score		Set 1	Set 2	Set 3	Set 4	Set 5	Total	Report
28 Jun	13:00	Bulgaria	1–3	Germany	16–25	18–25	31–29	21–25		86–104	Report

== Final standings ==
Rank	Team
1st place, gold medalist(s)	Germany
2nd place, silver medalist(s)	Bulgaria
3rd place, bronze medalist(s)	Russia
4	Poland
5	France
5	Serbia
5	Slovakia
5	Turkey
9	Belgium
9	Finland
11	Azerbaijan
11	Italy

2015 Men's European Games champions

Germany
1st title

== Medalists ==
Gold	Silver	Bronze
Germany (GER) Christian Fromm; Sebastian Kühner; Denis Kaliberda; Marcus Böhme; Jochen Schöps (captain); Lukas Kampa; Ferdinand Tille; Tom Strohbach; Tim Broshog; Jan Zimmermann; Michael Andrei; Björn Höhne; Matthias Pompe; Falko Steinke	Bulgaria (BUL) Georgi Bratoev; Rozalin Penchev; Martin Bozhilov; Svetoslav Gotsev; Velizar Chernokozhev; Branimir Grozdanov; Dobromir Dimitrov; Valentin Bratoev; Jani Jeliazkov; Todor Aleksiev (captain); Nikolay Nikolov; Borislav Apostolov; Ventsislav Ragin; Petar Karakashev	Russia (RUS) Ilia Vlasov; Dmitry Kovalev (captain); Ivan Demakov; Igor Kobzar; Alexander Markin; Igor Filippov; Alexey Kabeshov; Alexander Kimerov; Dmitrii Volkov; Viktor Poletaev; Maksim Zhigalov; Egor Kliuka; Sergey Nikitin; Roman Bragin

== See also ==
- Volleyball at the 2015 European Games – Women's tournament
