= Chono Penchev =

Bulgarian volleyball player (born 1994)

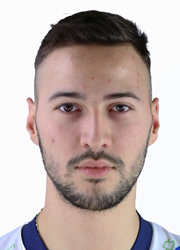
- Penchev in 2017

Personal information
- Full name: Chono Penchev
- Nationality: Bulgarian
- Born: 11 December 1994 (age 31); Plovdiv, Bulgaria
- Height: 2.00 m (6 ft 7 in)
- Weight: 89 kg (196 lb)
- Spike: 350 cm (140 in)
- Block: 330 cm (130 in)

Volleyball information
- Position: Setter
- Current club: Enosis Neon Paralimni
- Number: 16

Career
Years	Teams
2011–2012; 2012–2013; 2015; 2015–2017; 2017–	Victoria Volley; Razlog Pirin Balkanstroy; VK ČEZ Karlovarsko → Iraklis Thessaloniki → Azimut Modena
- Last updated: 23 Nov 2017

Chono Penchev (Bulgarian: Чоно Пенчев) (born 11 December 1994) is a Bulgarian volleyball player, and most recently played for Enosis Neon Paralimni in Cyprus.

== Personal life ==
Penchev was born in Plovdiv. He has two older brothers, Chavdar (born 1987), Nikolay (born 1992) and identical twin brother Rozalin, all of them are professional volleyball players.

== Career ==
In 2016 he was loaned by PGE Skra Bełchatów to Greek club Iraklis Thessaloniki. On November 21, 2017, he was loaned once again, this time to Italian club Azimut Modena.
