= Ji Tae-hwan =

South Korean volleyball player (born 1986)

Ji Tae-Hwan
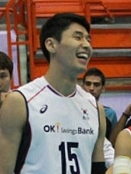
- Ji Tae-hwan with the Korea national team in 2015

Personal information
- Nationality: South Korean
- Born: 5 June 1986 (age 40)
- Height: 200 cm (6 ft 7 in)
- Weight: 89 kg (196 lb)
- Spike: 330 cm (130 in)
- Block: 315 cm (124 in)
- Education: Hanyang University

Volleyball information
- Position: Middle blocker
- Current club: Daejeon Samsung Fire Bluefangs
- Number: 15 (club); 20 (national team)

Career
Years	Teams
2010–	Daejeon Samsung Fire Bluefangs

National team
2015	South Korea

Ji Tae-Hwan (born 5 June 1986) is a South Korean male volleyball player. He is part of the South Korea men's national volleyball team. On club level he plays for Daejeon Samsung Fire Bluefangs.
