= Yoo Yoon-sik =

South Korean volleyball player (born 1989)

Yoo Yoon-Sik
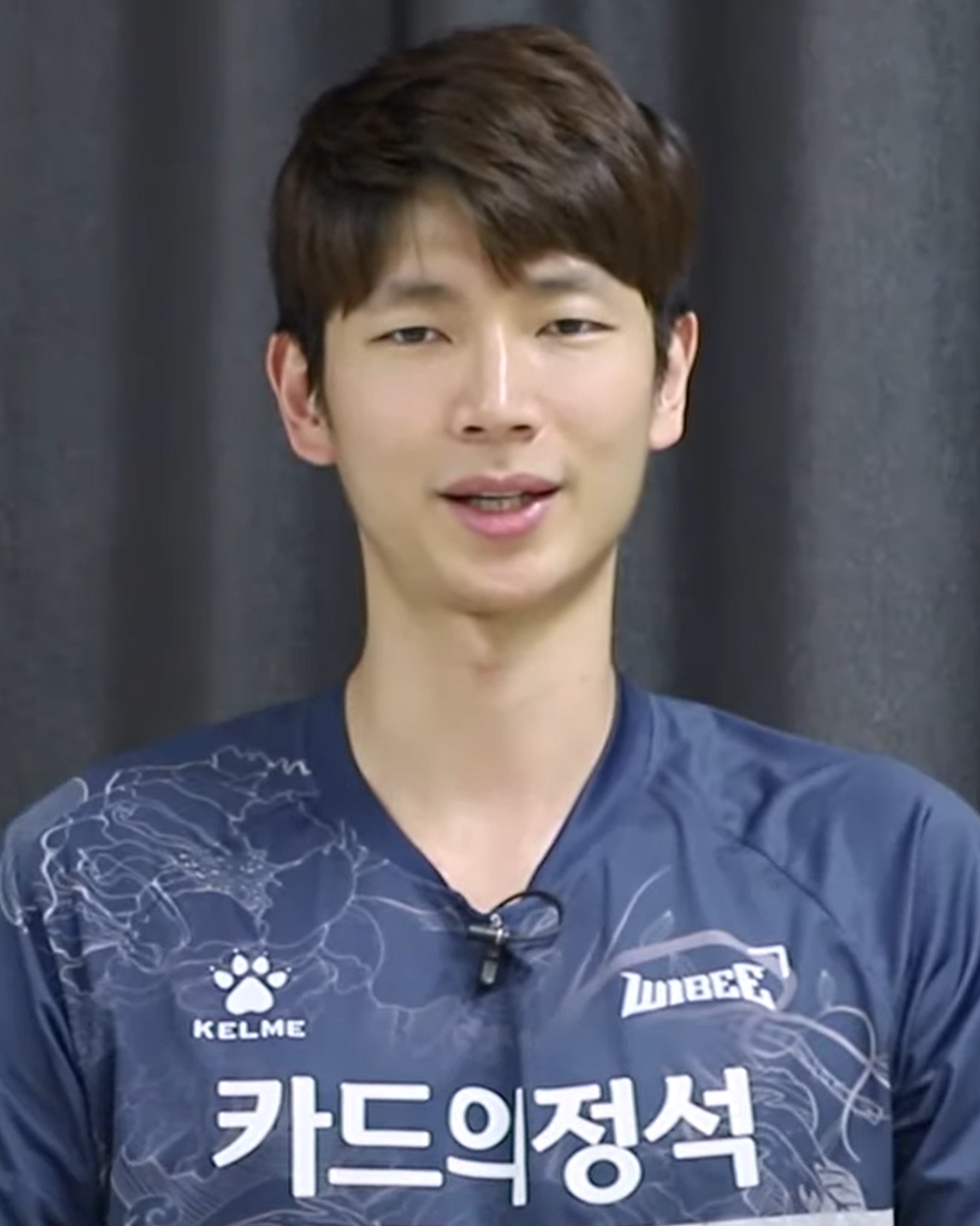
- Yoo in 2020

Personal information
- Full name: Yoo Yoon-Sik
- Nationality: South Korean
- Born: 2 May 1989 (age 37) Seongnam, Gyeonggi Province, South Korea
- Education: Hanyang University
- Height: 196 cm (6 ft 5 in)
- Weight: 75 kg (165 lb)
- Spike: 310 cm (122 in)
- Block: 300 cm (118 in)

Volleyball information
- Position: Outside hitter
- Current club: Seoul Woori Card Wibee
- Number: 8

Career
- Years: Team
- 2011 - 2014 2014 - 2020 2020 - current: Korean Air Jumbos; Samsung Fire Bluefangs; Seoul Woori Card Wibee

National team
- Years: Team
- 2017: South Korea

Yoo Yoon-Sik (Korean: 류윤식; born 2 May 1989) is a South Korean volleyball player. He competed at the 2017 FIVB World League as part of the South Korea men's national volleyball team. On club level he plays for the Seoul Woori Card Wibee.
