= Nikolay Penchev =

Bulgarian volleyball player (born 1992)

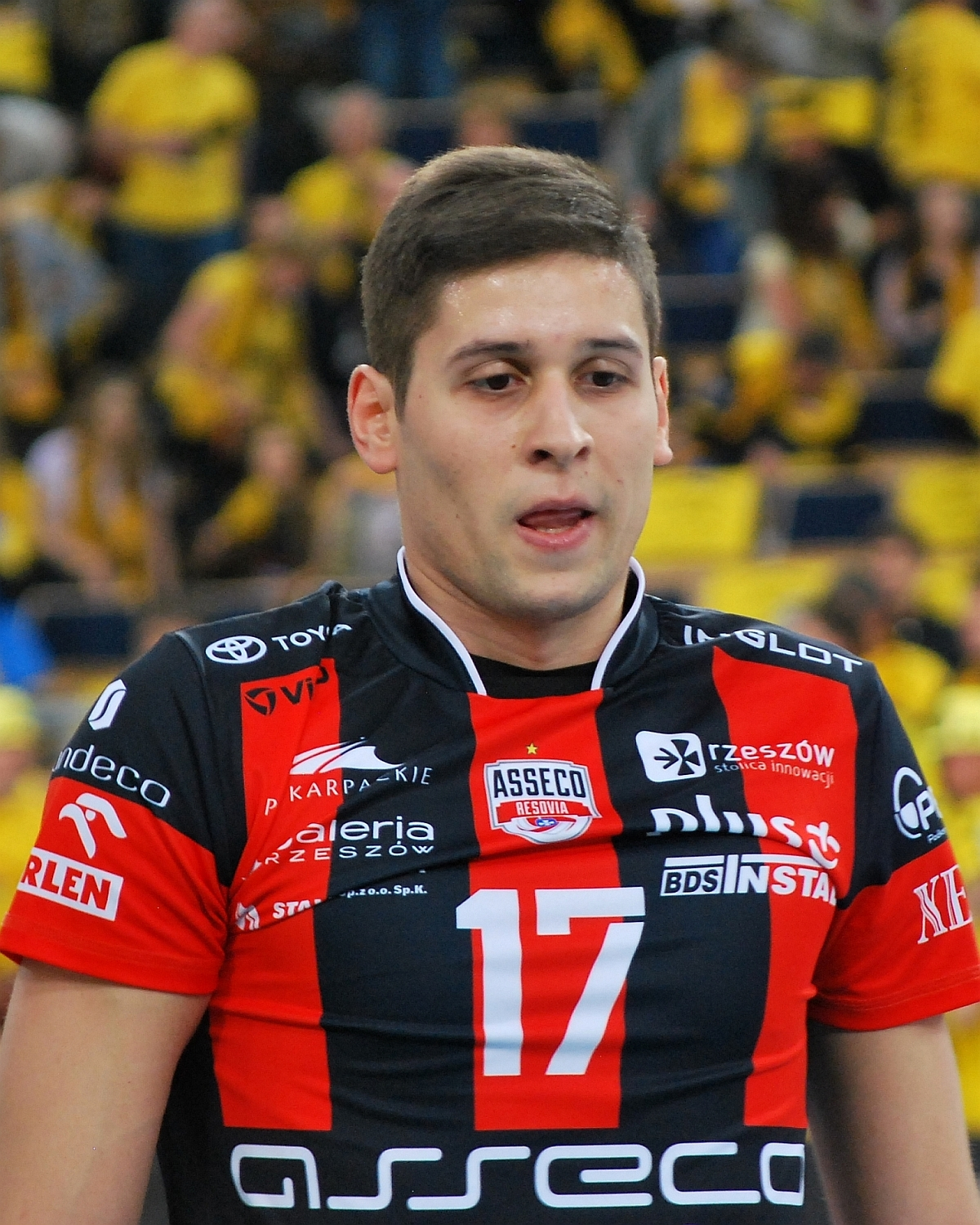

Personal information
- Nationality: Bulgarian
- Born: 22 May 1992 (age 34); Plovdiv, Bulgaria
- Height: 1.96 m (6 ft 5 in)
- Weight: 90 kg (198 lb)
- Spike: 341 cm (134 in)

Volleyball information
- Position: Outside hitter

Career
Years	Teams
2010–2011; 2011–2012; 2012–2013; 2013–2016; 2016–2018; 2018; 2018–2019; 2019–2020; 2020–2021; 2021–2022; 2022; 2022–2023; 2023–2024	Razlog Pirin Balkanstroy; Copra Elior Piacenza; Effector Kielce; Asseco Resovia; Skra Bełchatów; Stocznia Szczecin; Onico Warsaw; Warta Zawiercie; Cuprum Lubin; Stal Nysa; AS Cannes; Epicentr-Podolyany; Fenerbahçe Grundig

National team
2010–	Bulgaria

Nikolay Penchev (Bulgarian: Николай Пенчев; born 22 May 1992) is a Bulgarian professional volleyball player, a former member of the Bulgaria national team, and a participant at the Olympic Games London 2012.

== Personal life ==
Nikolay Penchev was born in Plovdiv, Bulgaria. His father is a former volleyball player. He has three brothers – older Chavdar (born 1987) and younger twin brothers, Chono and Rozalin (born 11 December 1994), who are also volleyball players. Chono is a setter, Rozalin plays as opposite or outside hitter.

== Career ==
=== Clubs ===
Penchev spent the 2012/2013 season in Effector Kielce. In 2013, he moved to Asseco Resovia and signed a two–year contract. In his first season in the new club, he won the Polish SuperCup and a silver medal of the Polish Championship after losing to PGE Skra Bełchatów in the final matches. In April 2015, alongside Asseco Resovia, he won the Polish Championship. In April 2015, he signed a new one–year contract with Resovia.

In May 2016, Penchev signed a one–year contract with another Polish team, PGE Skra Bełchatów.

== Honours ==
=== Clubs ===
- CEV Champions League
  - 2014/2015 – with Asseco Resovia
- National championships
  - 2013/2014 Polish SuperCup, with Asseco Resovia
  - 2014/2015 Polish Championship, with Asseco Resovia
  - 2017/2018 Polish SuperCup, with PGE Skra Bełchatów
  - 2017/2018 Polish Championship, with PGE Skra Bełchatów
  - 2022 Ukraine Cup, with VC Epicentr-Podolyany

=== Youth national team ===
- 2010 CEV U20 European Championship

=== Individual awards ===
- 2010: CEV U20 European Championship – Best Receiver
