= Georg Klein (volleyball) =

German volleyball player (born 1991)

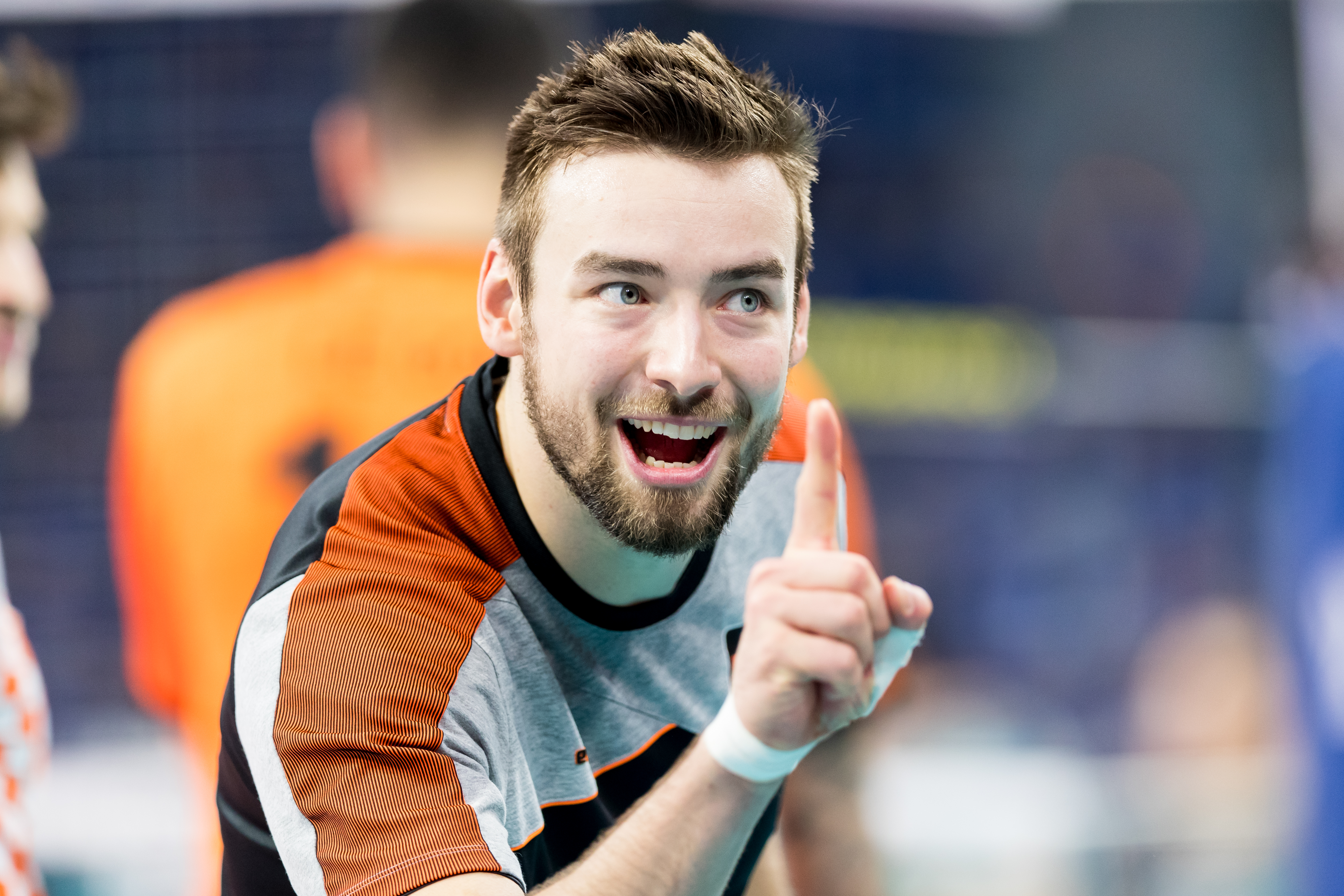
- 2020

Personal information
- Nationality: German
- Born: 22 August 1991 (age 35)
- Height: 201 cm (6 ft 7 in)
- Weight: 94 kg (207 lb)
- Spike: 348 cm (137 in)
- Block: 335 cm (132 in)

Volleyball information
- Number: 22 (national team)

Career
| Years | Teams |
|---|---|
| 2014 | SWD powervolleys Düren |

National team
| 2014 | Germany |

Georg Klein (born 22 August 1991) is a former German male volleyball player. He was part of the Germany men's national volleyball team. On club level he played for SWD powervolleys Düren.
