= Stanislav Petkov =

Bulgarian volleyball player (born 1987)

Personal information
- Nationality: Bulgarian
- Born: 31 December 1987 (age 38)
- Height: 202 cm (6 ft 8 in)
- Weight: 104 kg (229 lb)
- Spike: 355 cm (140 in)
- Block: 345 cm (136 in)

Volleyball information
- Number: 2 (national team)

Career
Years	Teams
2015	Tomis

National team
2015	Bulgaria

Stanislav Petkov (Bulgarian: Станислав Петков; born 31 December 1987) is a male Bulgarian volleyball player. He is part of the Bulgaria men's national volleyball team. On the club level he plays for Tomis.
