= Tom Strohbach =

German volleyball player (born 1992)

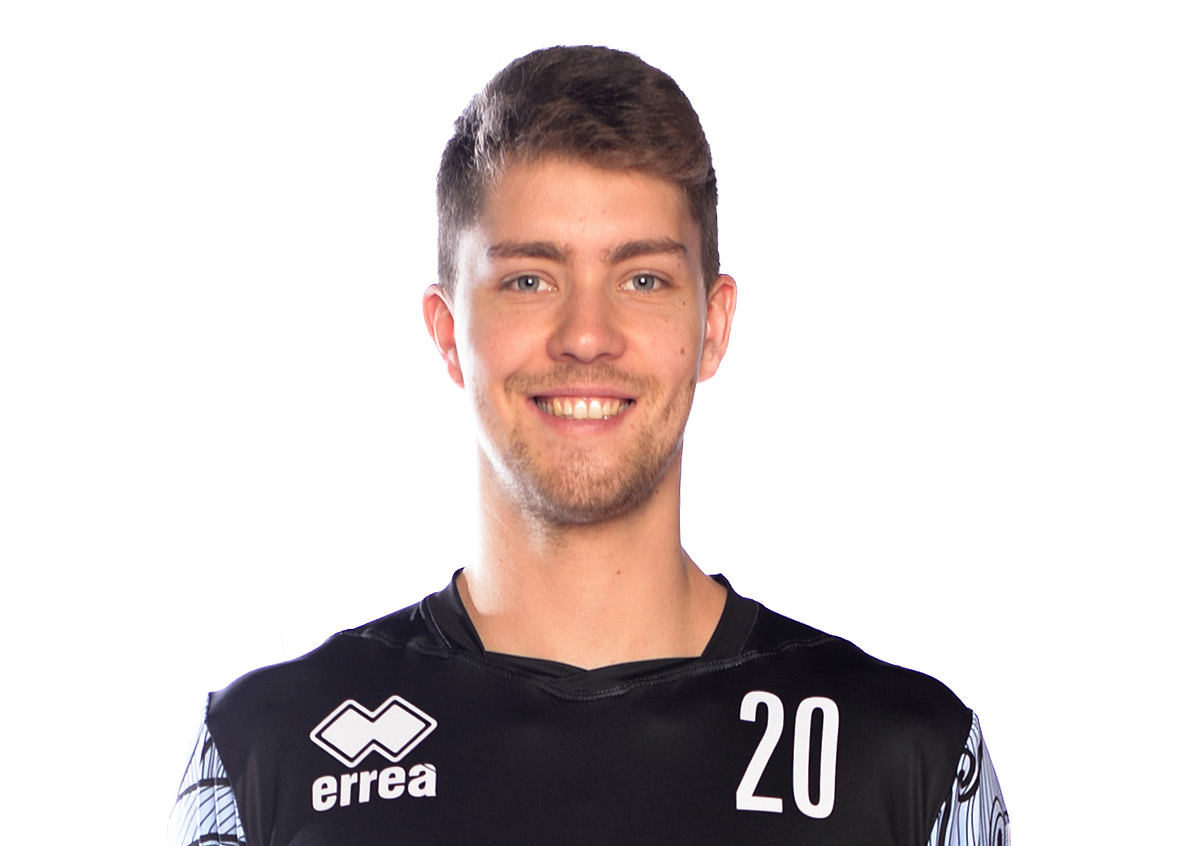
- Strohbach in 2019

Personal information
- Nationality: German
- Born: 27 May 1992 (age 34)
- Height: 199 cm (6 ft 6 in)
- Weight: 83 kg (183 lb)
- Spike: 338 cm (133 in)
- Block: 329 cm (130 in)

Volleyball information
- Number: 14 (national team)

Career
- Years: Team
- –2011 2011–2014 2014–2016 2016–2018 seit 2018: Schweriner SC; VC Olympia Berlin; Generali Haching; TV Rottenburg; TSV Herrsching; Volley Callipo

National team
- Years: Team
- 2013–2017: Germany
Medal record
Men's volleyball
Representing Germany
European Games
Gold medal – first place	2015 Baku	Team

Tom Strohbach (born 27 May 1992) is a former German male volleyball player. He was part of the Germany men's national volleyball team winning the gold medal at the 2015 European Games in Baku. On club level he played for Generali Unterhaching.
