= Guillaume Quesque =

French volleyball player (born 1989)

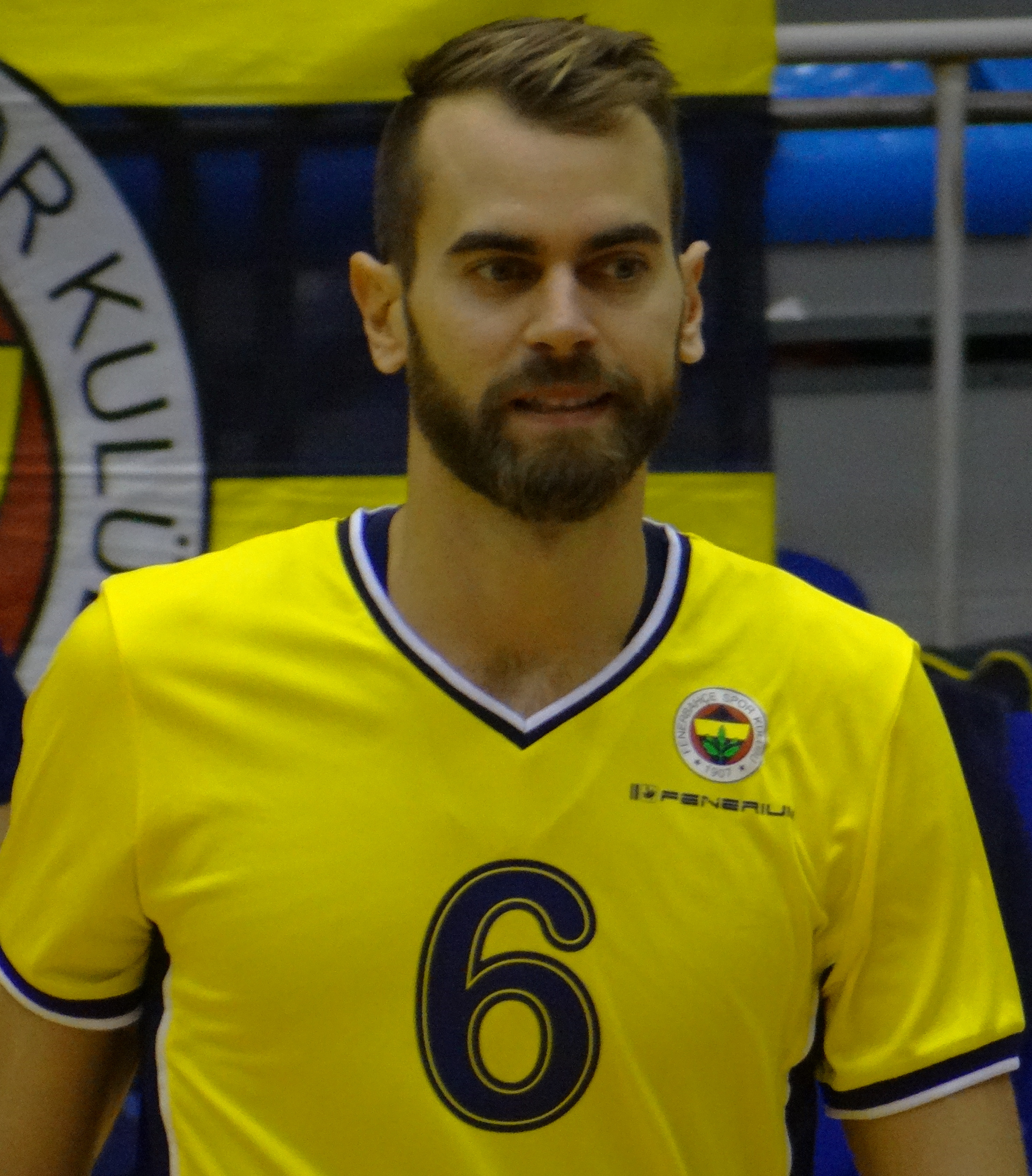

Personal information
- Nationality: French
- Born: 29 April 1989 (age 37); Paris, France
- Height: 2.03 m (6 ft 8 in)
- Weight: 92 kg (203 lb)
- Spike: 345 cm (136 in)
- Block: 325 cm (128 in)

Volleyball information
- Position: Outside hitter
- Current club: Fenerbahçe Istanbul
- Number: 6

Career
Years	Teams
2001–2002; 2002–2005; 2005–2008; 2008–2010; 2010–2012; 2012–2014; 2014; 2014; 2014–2015; 2015–	Levallois SC; Asnières Volley 92; CNVB; Tours VB; Montpellier UC; Casa Modena; Yaroslacich Yaroslavl; Volley Milano; Jastrzębski Węgiel; Fenerbahçe Istanbul

National team
2011–	France
Honours
Men's volleyball
Representing France
World League
Gold medal – first place	2017 Curitiba
- Last updated: 26 January 2018

Guillaume Quesque (born 29 April 1989) is a French volleyball player, a member of France men's national volleyball team and Turkish club Fenerbahçe Istanbul, a gold medalist of the 2017 World League, French Champion (2010).

== Career ==
=== Clubs ===
His professional career began in Tours VB in 2008. On 4 December 2014 he terminated the contract with the Italian club and became a free player. On 19 December 2014 he signed a contract with Polish club Jastrzębski Węgiel.

== Sporting achievements ==
=== Clubs ===
==== National championships ====
- 2008/2009 French Cup, with Tours VB
- 2009/2010 French Cup, with Tours VB
- 2009/2010 French Championship, with Tours VB
- 2016/2017 Turkish Cup, with Fenerbahçe

=== National team ===
- 2007 CEV U19 European Championship
- 2007 FIVB U19 World Championship
- 2008 CEV U21 European Championship
- 2017 FIVB World League

=== Individually ===
- 2007 CEV U19 European Championship - Most Valuable Player
