= Michael Andrei =

Romanian-born German volleyball player

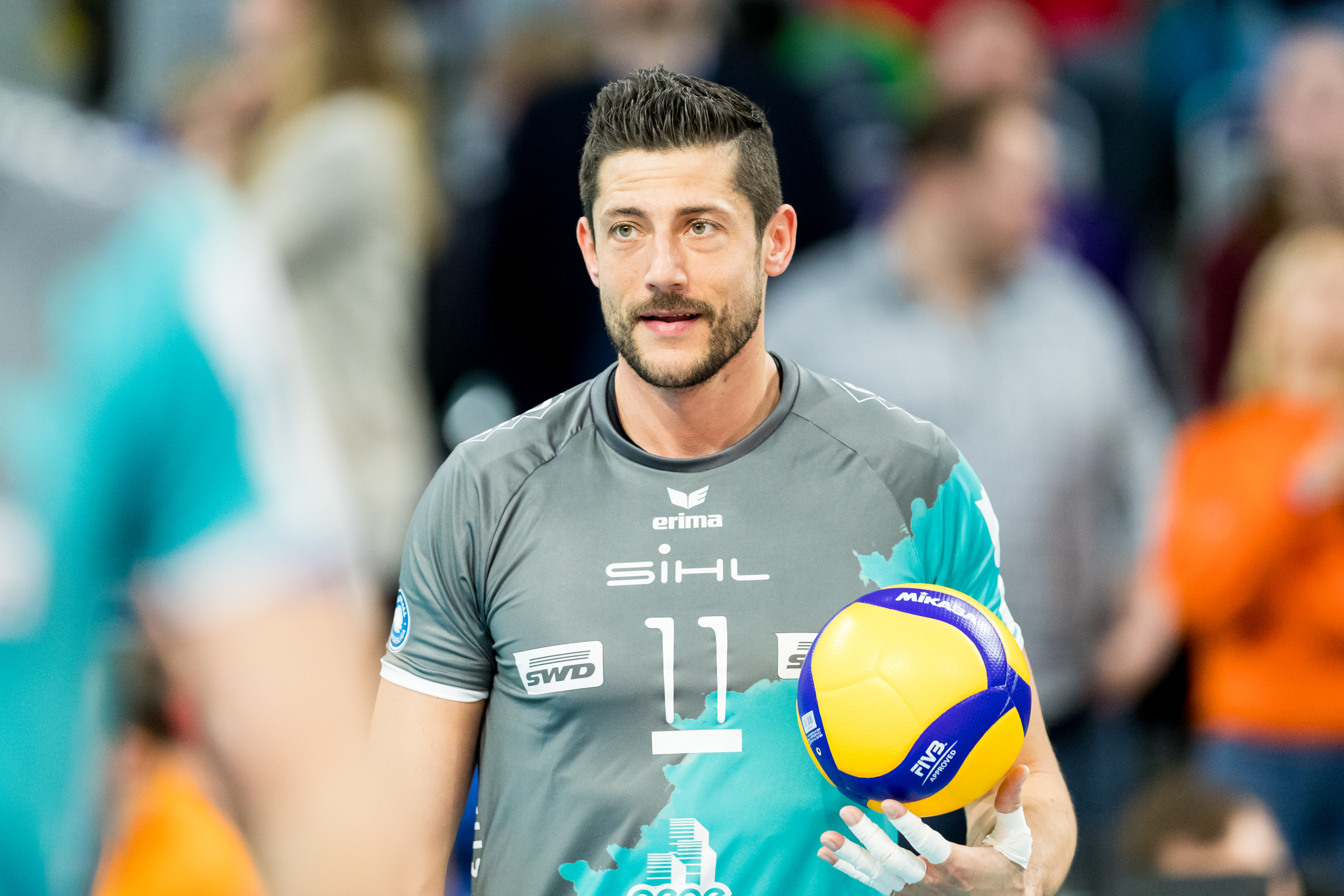
- Andrei in February 2020

Personal information
- Born: August 6, 1985 (age 41); Constanța, Romania
- Height: 2.10 m (6 ft 11 in)
- Weight: 98 kg (216 lb)
- Spike: 345 cm (136 in)
- Block: 340 cm (134 in)

Volleyball information
- Position: Middle blocker

Career
Years	Teams
–2006; 2006–2009; 2009–2011; 2011–2012; 2012–2014; 2014–2015; 2015–2016; 2016–2025	VC Strassen; SWD Powervolleys Düren; TSV Giesen Hildesheim; VC Gotha; Saint-Nazaire VBA; Topvolley Antwerpen; GFC Ajaccio; SWD Powervolleys Düren

National team
2013–	Germany
Honours
Men's volleyball
Representing Germany
World Championship
Bronze medal – third place	2014 Poland
European Championship
Silver medal – second place	2017 Poland
European Games
Gold medal – first place	2015 Baku	Team

Michael Andrei (born 6 August 1985) is a Romanian-born German volleyball player, who is a member of the German national team. He won the bronze medal at the 2014 World Championship.

== Sporting achievements ==
=== National team ===
- 2014 FIVB World Championship
- 2015 European Games
- 2017 European Championship
