= Sebastian Kühner =

German volleyball player (born 1987)

Personal information
- Born: 15 March 1987 (age 39); Berlin, Germany
- Height: 2.03 m (6 ft 8 in)
- Weight: 91 kg (201 lb)
- Spike: 341 cm (134 in)
- Block: 332 cm (131 in)

Volleyball information
- Position: Setter
- Current team: SCC Berlin

National team
Germany
Honours
Representing Germany
Men's volleyball
World Championship
Bronze medal – third place	2014 Poland
European Games
Gold medal – first place	2015 Baku
- Last updated: 28 June 2015

Sebastian Kühner (born 15 March 1987) is a German volleyball player, who is a member of the German national team and SCC Berlin. He won the bronze medal at the 2014 World Championship.

== Sporting achievements ==
=== National team ===
- 2014 FIVB World Championship
- 2015 European Games
