= Tim Broshog =

German volleyball player (born 1987)

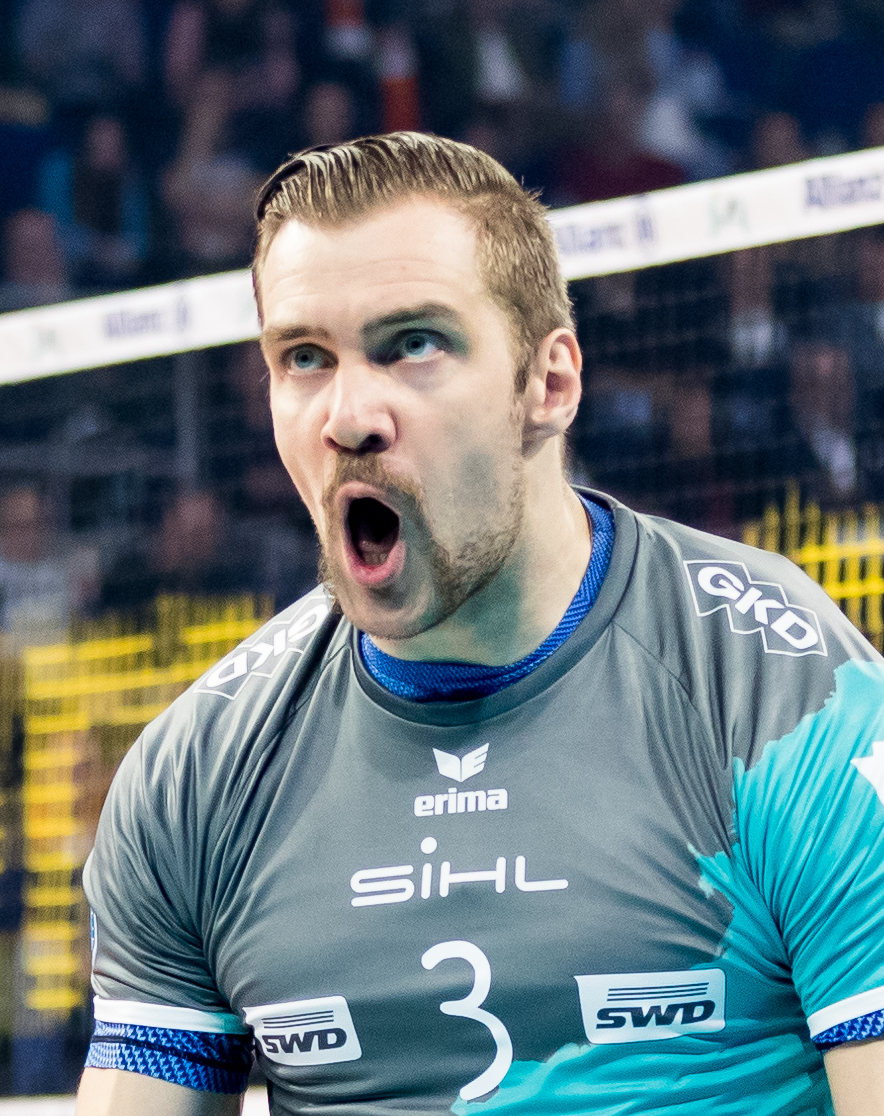

Personal information
- Born: December 2, 1987 (age 38) Berlin, Germany
- Height: 2.05 m (6 ft 9 in)
- Weight: 112 kg (247 lb)
- Spike: 340 cm (130 in)
- Block: 332 cm (131 in)

Volleyball information
- Position: Middle blocker
- Current team: (Belgium) Noliko Maaseik

National team
- Years: Team
- –: Germany
Honours
Representing Germany
Men's volleyball
World Championship
Bronze medal – third place	2014 Poland
European Games
Gold medal – first place	2015 Baku
- Updated on 28 June 2015

Tim Broshog (born 2 December 1987) is a German volleyball player, who is a member of the German national team and Noliko Maaseik. He won the bronze medal at the 2014 World Championship.

== Sporting achievements ==
=== National team ===
- 2014 FIVB World Championship
- 2015 European Games
