= Branimir Grozdanov =

Bulgarian volleyball player (born 1994)

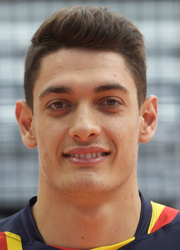

Personal information
- Nationality: Bulgarian
- Born: 21 May 1994 (age 32)
- Height: 198 cm (6 ft 6 in)
- Weight: 88 kg (194 lb)
- Spike: 362 cm (143 in)
- Block: 350 cm (138 in)

Volleyball information
- Current club: (Turkey) Develi Belediyespor
- Number: 11 (national team)

Career
Years	Teams
2022–2023	Develi Belediyespor

National team
2014	Bulgaria
Medal record
Men's volleyball
Representing Bulgaria
European Games
Silver medal – second place	2015 Baku	Team competition

Branimir Grozdanov (Bulgarian: Бранимир Грозданов; born 21 May 1994) is a Bulgarian male volleyball player. He was part of the Bulgaria men's national volleyball team that won the silver medal at the 2015 European Games in Baku. He has played for Develi Belediyespor.
