= Christian Fromm =

German volleyball player (born 1990)

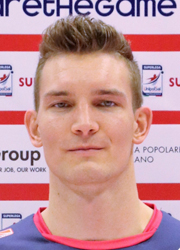

Personal information
- Born: 15 August 1990 (age 36); Berlin, Germany
- Height: 2.04 m (6 ft 8 in)
- Weight: 99 kg (218 lb)
- Spike: 345 cm (136 in)
- Block: 324 cm (128 in)

Volleyball information
- Position: Outside hitter
- Current club: Olympiacos SF Piraeus
- Number: 1

Career
Years	Teams
2009–2011; 2011–2012; 2012–2014; 2014–2016; 2016–2017; 2017–2018; 2018–2020; 2020–2021; 2021; 2021–2022; 2022; 2022–2023; 2023–2024; 2024–2025; 2025–	VfB Friedrichshafen; SWD Powervolleys Düren; Pallavolo Città di Castello; Sir Safety Perugia; Gi Group Monza; Arkas İzmir; Jastrzębski Węgiel; Olympiacos Piraeus; AS Cannes; Volley Callipo; Al Arabi Doha; Foinikas Syros; Rapid București; Dinamo București; Olympiacos Piraeus

National team
2013–	Germany
Honours
Men's volleyball
Representing Germany
FIVB World Championship
Bronze medal – third place	2014 Poland
CEV European Championship
Silver medal – second place	2017 Poland
European Games
Gold medal – first place	2015 Baku

Christian Fromm (born 15 August 1990) is a German professional volleyball player who plays as an outside hitter for Olympiacos Piraeus and the Germany national team.

== Personal life ==
On 24 June 2017, Fromm married Maren Brinker.

== Honours ==
=== Club ===
- National championships
  - 2009–10 German Championship, with VfB Friedrichshafen
  - 2010–11 German Championship with VfB Friedrichshafen
  - 2015–16 Italian Championship, with Umbria Volley Perugia
  - 2017–18 Turkish Championship, with Arkas Spor İzmir
  - 2018–19 Polish Championship, with Jastrzębski Węgiel
  - 2020–21 Hellenic Championship, with Olympiacos Piraeus
  - 2023–24 Romanian Championship, with Rapid București
  - 2024–25 Romanian Championship, with Dinamo București
- National cups
  - 2010–11 German Cup, with VfB Friedrichshafen
  - 2018–19 Polish Cup, with Jastrzębski Węgiel
  - 2023–24 Romanian Cup, with Rapid București
  - 2025–26 Hellenic League Cup, with Olympiacos Piraeus
  - 2025–26 2025 Hellenic Super Cup, with Olympiacos Piraeus

=== National team ===
- 2014 FIVB World Championship
- 2015 European Games
- 2017 CEV European Championship

=== Individual awards ===
- 2024: Romanian Championship – Dream Team
- 2025: Romanian Championship – Dream Team
