= Björn Höhne =

German volleyball player (born 1991)

Personal information
- Nickname: Björni
- Born: 27 March 1991 (age 35); Berlin, Germany
- Height: 1.93 m (6 ft 4 in)
- Weight: 94 kg (207 lb)
- Spike: 345 cm (136 in)
- Block: 330 cm (130 in)

Volleyball information
- Current team: (Belgium) Noliko Maaseik
- Number: 10

National team
Germany
Honours
Representing Germany
Men's volleyball
European Games
Gold medal – first place	2015 Baku
- Last updated: 28 June 2015

Björn Höhne (born 27 March 1991) is a German volleyball player who is the member of the German national team and currently plays for Belgian volleyball team Noliko Maaseik.

== Career ==
Höhne began his volleyball career at Berliner TSC. Later he joined the VC Olympia and was appointed to the German junior national team. He led the under-21 team as a captain for FIVB Volleyball Men's U21 World Championship 2011 in Brazil, where it reached the 10th place. Subsequently, the external attacker was from the Bundesliga Berlin Recycling Volleys, where he became a champion in 2012–13 season. In 2013 Björn Höhne had his first six appearances in the senior team and he finished in 6th place at the 2013 Men's European Volleyball Championship in Denmark and Poland. He had then moved on to Premier League rivals TV Bühl. In 2014 he joined the Belgian volleyball team Noliko Maaseik.

== Sporting achievements ==
=== National team ===
- 2015 European Games
