= Borislav Apostolov =

Bulgarian volleyball player (born 1990)

Personal information
- Nationality: Bulgarian
- Born: 7 December 1990 (age 35)
- Height: 208 cm (6 ft 10 in)
- Weight: 97 kg (214 lb)
- Spike: 350 cm (138 in)
- Block: 335 cm (132 in)

Volleyball information
- Number: 25 (national team)

Career
Years	Teams
2015	Marek Union Ivkoni

National team
2015	Bulgaria
Medal record
Men's volleyball
Representing Bulgaria
European Games
Silver medal – second place	2015 Baku	Team competition

Borislav Apostolov (Bulgarian: Борислав Апостолов) (born 7 December 1990) is a Bulgarian male volleyball player. He is part of the Bulgaria men's national volleyball team winning the silver medal at the 2015 European Games in Baku. On club level he currently plays for Marek Union Ivkoni.
