= Dobromir Dimitrov =

Bulgarian volleyball player (born 1991)

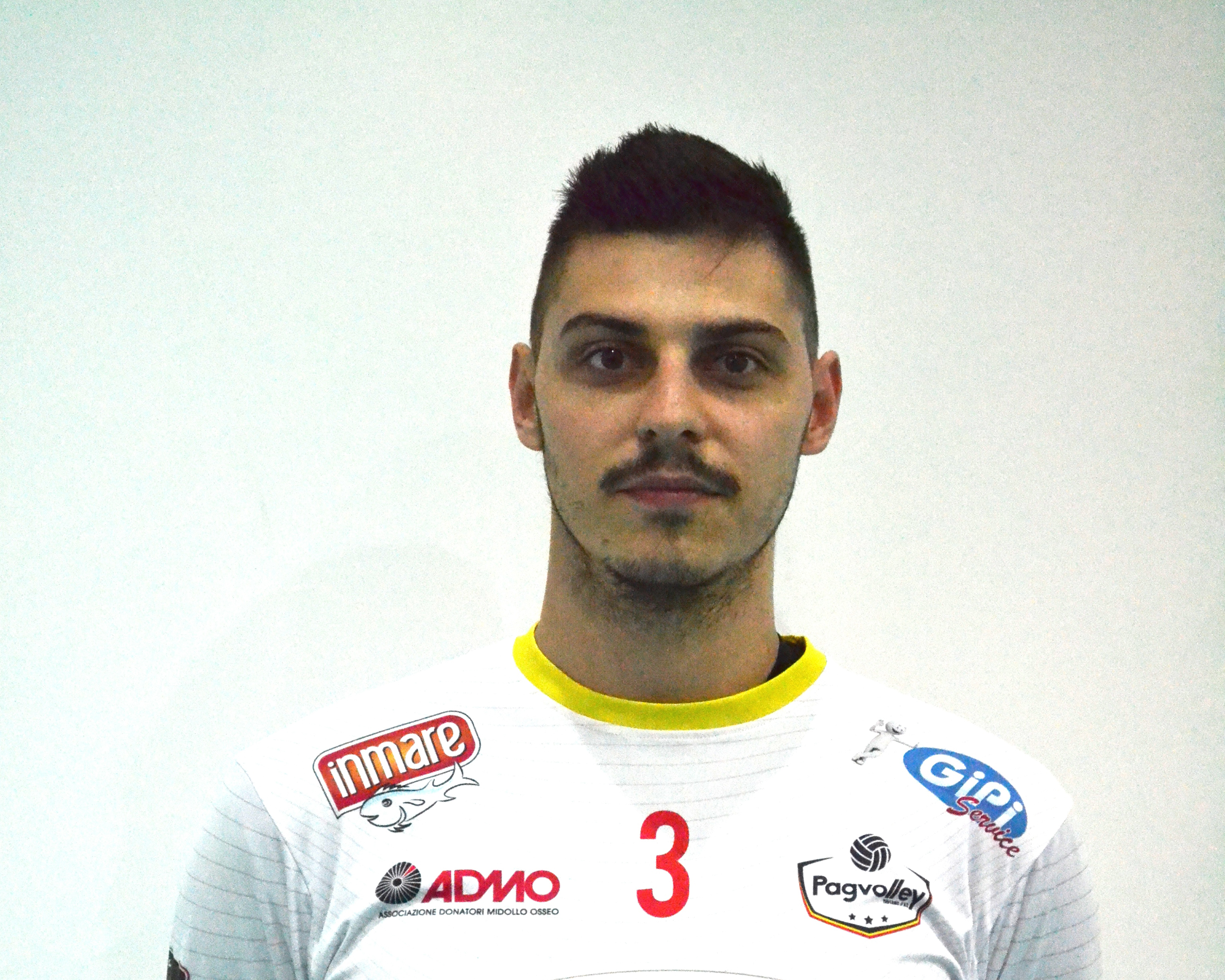
- Dimitrov in 2019

Personal information
- Nationality: (Bulgaria) Bulgarian
- Born: 7 July 1991 (age 35); Pazardzhik, Bulgaria
- Height: 1.96 m (6 ft 5 in)
- Weight: 81 kg (179 lb)
- Spike: 342 cm (135 in)
- Block: 322 cm (127 in)

Volleyball information
- Position: Setter
- Current club: (Iran) Arman Ardakan
- Number: 9

Career
Years	Teams
2007-2011; 2012-2013; 2014-2014; 2015-2016; 2016-	(Bulgaria) Pirin Balkanstroy (Bulgaria) CVC Gabrovo (Romania) CSM Bucuresti (Italy) Sir Safety Perugia (Iran) Arman Ardakan

National team
2012-	Bulgaria
Medal record
Men's volleyball
Representing Bulgaria
European Games
Silver medal – second place	2015 Baku	Team competition

Dobromir Dimitrov (Bulgarian: Добромир Димитров; born 7 July 1991) is a former Bulgarian male volleyball player. He was part of the Bulgaria men's national volleyball team. He competed with the national team at the 2012 Summer Olympics in London, Great Britain. He played now in Club Arman Ardakan. In the summer of 2018 he married former Miss Bulgaria Nansi Karaboycheva.

== See also ==
- Bulgaria at the 2012 Summer Olympics
