= Georgi Bratoev =

Bulgarian volleyball player (born 1987)

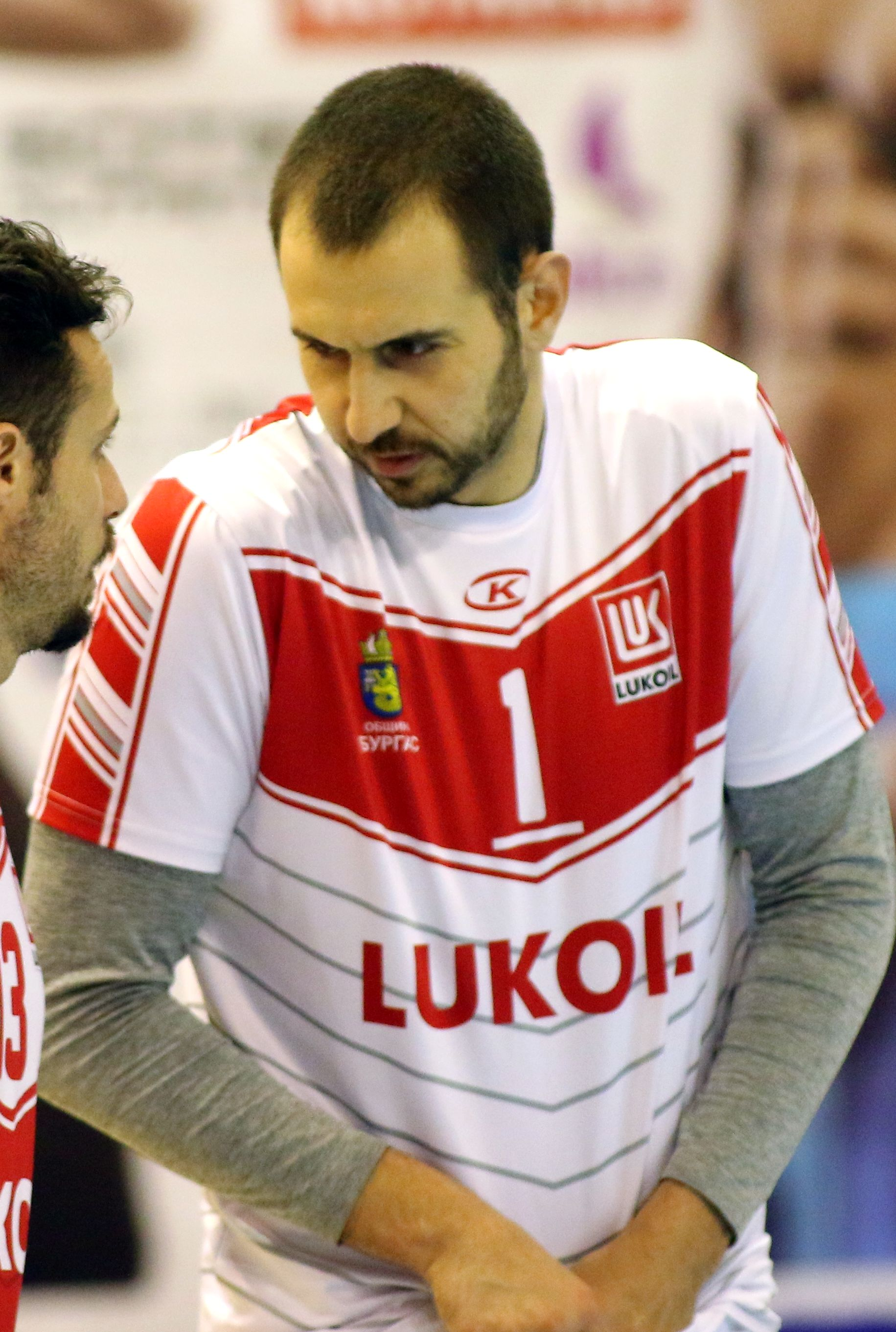
- Bratoev in 2018

Personal information
- Full name: Georgi Sashkov Bratoev
- Nationality: Bulgarian
- Born: 21 October 1987 (age 39); Sofia, Bulgaria
- Height: 2.03 m (6 ft 8 in)
- Weight: 96 kg (212 lb)
- Spike: 340 cm (134 in)
- Block: 325 cm (128 in)

Volleyball information
- Position: Setter
- Current club: Deya Volley Burgas
- Number: 7

Career
Years	Teams
1999-2004; 2004-2010; 2010–2011; 2011–2012; 2012; 2012–2013; 2013; 2013–2014; 2013–2015; 2015–2016; 2016; 2017–2025; 2025–	Slavia Sofia; Levski Sofia; VC Tyumen; Levski Sofia → Al Rayyan (loan); Levski Sofia; Samotlor Nizhnevartovsk; VC Lokomotyv Kharkiv; Slavia Sofia; Trentino Volley; Espadon Szczecin; Neftochimic 2010; Deya Volley Burgas

National team
2007–2023	Bulgaria
Honours
Representing Bulgaria
Men's volleyball
European Championship
Bronze medal – third place	2009 Turkey
European Games
Silver medal – second place	2015 Baku	Team
- Last updated: 14 May 2026

Georgi Sashkov Bratoev (Bulgarian: Георги Сашков Братоев, born 21 October 1987) is a Bulgarian volleyball player, a member of Bulgaria men's national volleyball team, and a bronze medalist of the 2009 European Championship.

== Personal life ==
Bratoev has a twin brother, Valentin, who is also a volleyball player (outside hitter).

== Career ==
In 2016, Bratoev signed a one-year contract with Polish club Espadon Szczecin.

== Sporting achievements ==
=== Clubs ===
==== CEV Champions League ====
- 2015/2016 - with Trentino Diatec

=== National team ===
- 2009 CEV European Championship

=== Individual ===
- 2012 FIVB Volleyball World League - Best Setter
- 2012 Olympic Games London - Best Setter
