= Nikolay Nikolov (volleyball) =

Bulgarian volleyball player

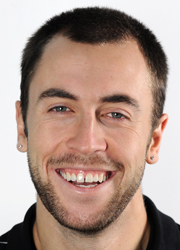
- Nikolov in 2011

Personal information
- Nationality: Bulgarian
- Born: 29 July 1986 (age 40); Karnobat, Bulgaria
- Height: 2.06 m (6 ft 9 in)
- Weight: 97 kg (214 lb)
- Spike: 350 cm (138 in)
- Block: 332 cm (131 in)

Volleyball information
- Position: Middle blocker
- Current club: Belogorie Belgorod
- Number: 7

Career
| Years | Teams |
|---|---|
| 2006–2009; 2009–2010; 2010–2012; 2012–2014; 2014–2015; 2015–2016; 2016–2017; 2017; 2017–2018; 2018–2019 | Lukoil Neftohimik; VC CSKA Sofia; Vibo Valentia; Matin Varamin; Shahrdari Urmia; Paykan Tehran; VC Yenisey Krasnoyarsk; Lukoil Neftohimik; Belogorie Belgorod; Sporting Clube de Portugal |

National team
| 2007–2019 | Bulgaria |
Honours
Men's volleyball
Representing Bulgaria
World Cup
| Bronze medal – third place | 2007 Japan |
European Championship
| Bronze medal – third place | 2009 Turkey |
European Games
| Silver medal – second place | 2015 Baku | Team |
- Last updated: 20 December 2017

Nikolay Nikolov (Bulgarian: Николай Николов; born 29 July 1986) is a Bulgarian volleyball player.

== Career ==
He started his career in 2006 in Lukoil (Burgas). In 2009, he moved to CSKA (Sofia). In 2010 he signed contract with Volley Callipo (Italy). His contract ended in 2012. In 2013–2014, he played in Iran's Matin (Varamin). In 2014, he competed for Shahrdari (Urmia), and from 2015 he moved to Paykan (Tehran).

== Awards ==
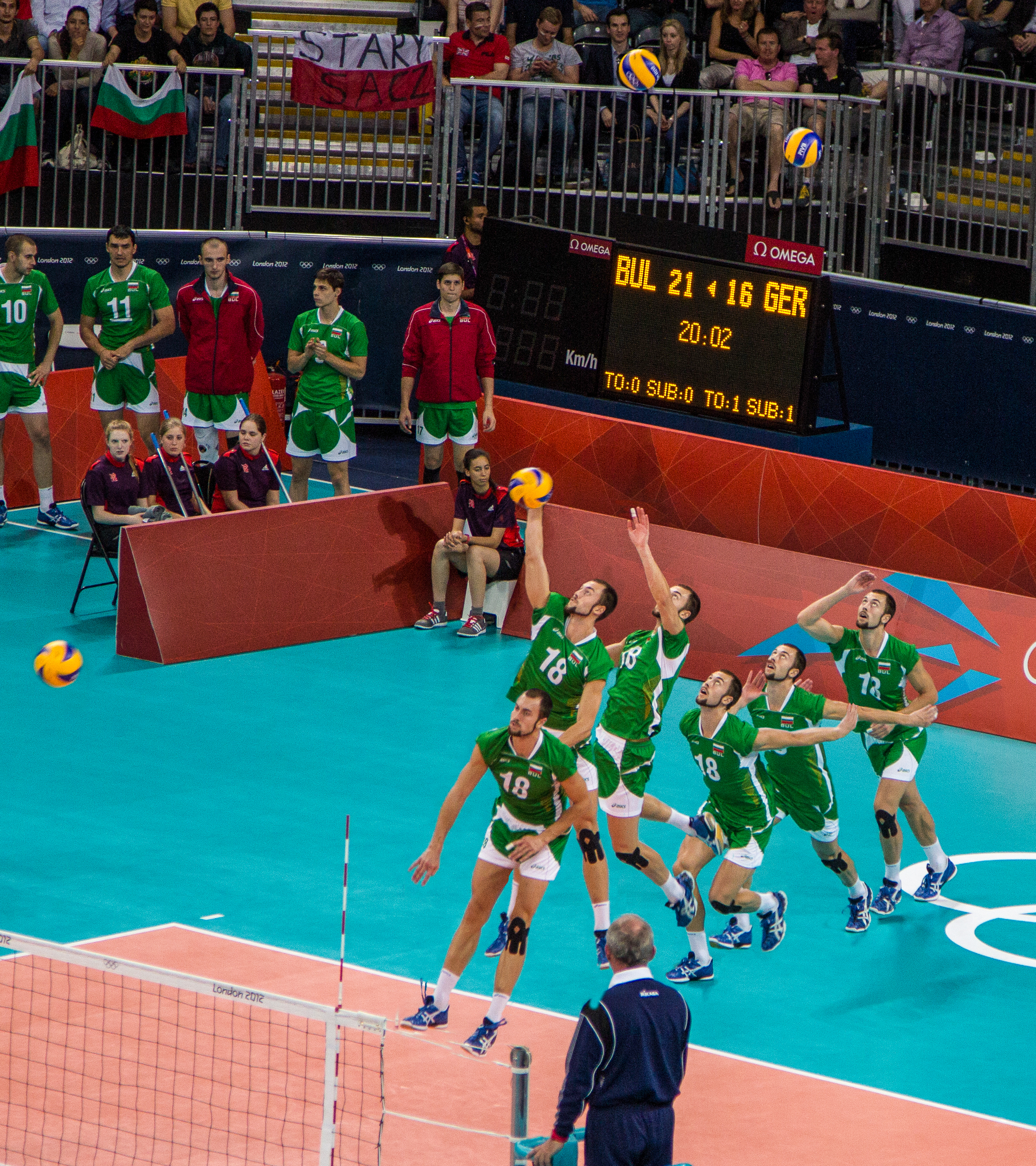
Nikolov serve at the 2012 Olympics.

=== Individual ===
- 2015 FIVB Club World Championship – Best Middle Blocker
