= Martin Bozhilov =

Bulgarian volleyball player (born 1988)

Personal information
- Nationality: Bulgarian
- Born: 11 April 1988 (age 38)
- Height: 1.90 m (6 ft 3 in)
- Weight: 82 kg (181 lb)
- Spike: 320 cm (126 in)
- Block: 305 cm (120 in)

Volleyball information
- Current club: CSKA Sofia
- Number: 13

Career
Years	Teams
2010-2016; 2016-2019; 2019-2023; 2023-present	(Bulgaria) Marek Union Ivkoni (Bulgaria) CSKA Sofia (Bulgaria) Montana (Bulgaria) CSKA Sofia

National team
2014-present	Bulgaria
Medal record
Men's volleyball
Representing Bulgaria
European Games
Silver medal – second place	2015 Baku	Team competition

Martin Bozhilov (Bulgarian: Мартин Божилов) (born 11 April 1988) is a Bulgarian male volleyball player. He was part of the Bulgaria men's national volleyball team at the 2014 FIVB Volleyball Men's World Championship in Poland. He plays for CSKA Sofia.

== Clubs ==
- Marek Union Ivkoni (2010–2016)
- CSKA Sofia (2016–2019)
- Montana (2019–2023)
- CSKA Sofia (2023-still)
