= Rozalin Penchev =

Bulgarian volleyball player (born 1994)

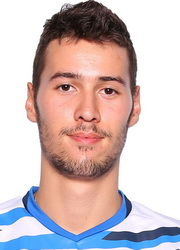
- Penchev in 2016

Personal information
- Born: 11 December 1994 (age 31); Plovdiv, Bulgaria
- Height: 202 cm (6 ft 8 in)
- Weight: 90 kg (198 lb)
- Spike: 363 cm (143 in)
- Block: 335 cm (132 in)

Volleyball information
- Position: Outside hitter
- Current club: Sesc Rio
- Number: 16

Career
Years	Teams
2014–2015; 2015–2016; 2016–2017; 2017	Effector Kielce; Tokat Belediye Plevnespor → Top Volley Latina (loan); Personal Bolívar

National team
2015–2020	Bulgaria
Honours
Men's volleyball
Representing Bulgaria
European Games
Silver medal – second place	2015 Baku	Team
- Last updated: 23 November 2017

Rozalin Penchev (born 11 December 1994) is a Bulgarian volleyball player, and a Brazilian club Sesc RJ member.

== Personal life ==
Penchev was born in Plovdiv. He has two older brothers, Chavdar (born 1987), Nikolay (born 1992) and identical twin brother Chono, all of them are professional volleyball players.

== Career ==
In 2014 he started his professional career in the Polish club Effector Kielce, but it was a weak season for the team and Effector took 12th place in PlusLiga. With Bulgaria national team he achieved silver medal in 2015 European Games. Then he moved to Turkish team, where he has played one season and the team took 10th place in the league. In 2016 PGE Skra Bełchatów loaned him to Italian club Top Volley Latina. In 2017 he moved to Personal Bolívar, in the Liga Argentina de Voleibol.

== Sporting achievements ==
=== National team ===
- 2015 European Games
