= Velizar Chernokozhev =

Bulgarian volleyball player (born 1995)

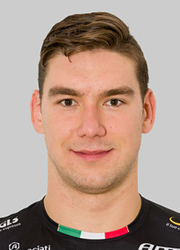

Personal information
- Nationality: Bulgarian
- Born: 23 April 1995 (age 31) Tryavna
- Height: 2.15 m (7 ft 1 in)
- Weight: 105 kg (231 lb)
- Spike: 365 cm (144 in)
- Block: 340 cm (134 in)

Volleyball information
- Position: Opposite
- Current club: Beroe
- Number: 6

National team
- Years: Team
- Bulgaria
Honours
Men's volleyball
Representing Bulgaria
European Games
| Silver medal – second place | 2015 Baku | Team |
- Updated on 30 December 2017

Velizar Chernokozhev (Bulgarian: Велизар Чернокожев; born 23 April 1995) is a Bulgarian volleyball player for Beroe and the Bulgarian national team.

He participated at the 2017 Men's European Volleyball Championship. He won a silver medal with Sir Safety Conad Perugia from the 2017, CEV Volleyball Champions League. In 2016, he played for the Bulgarian team Dobrudja 07 and became champion in serie A, Bulgaria Superleague CAMI-M. At the age of 21, in 2016, he was captain of the 'B' Bulgaria men's national team for the European League, where the team finished 4th. He participated in the first European Olympic Games in Baku in 2015 and won silver medal with the Bulgaria men's national team. In 2014 he won the Cup of Bulgaria with Levski Volley and was vice champion in the Bulgarian Superleague.
