= Valentin Bratoev =

Bulgarian volleyball player and beach volleyball player

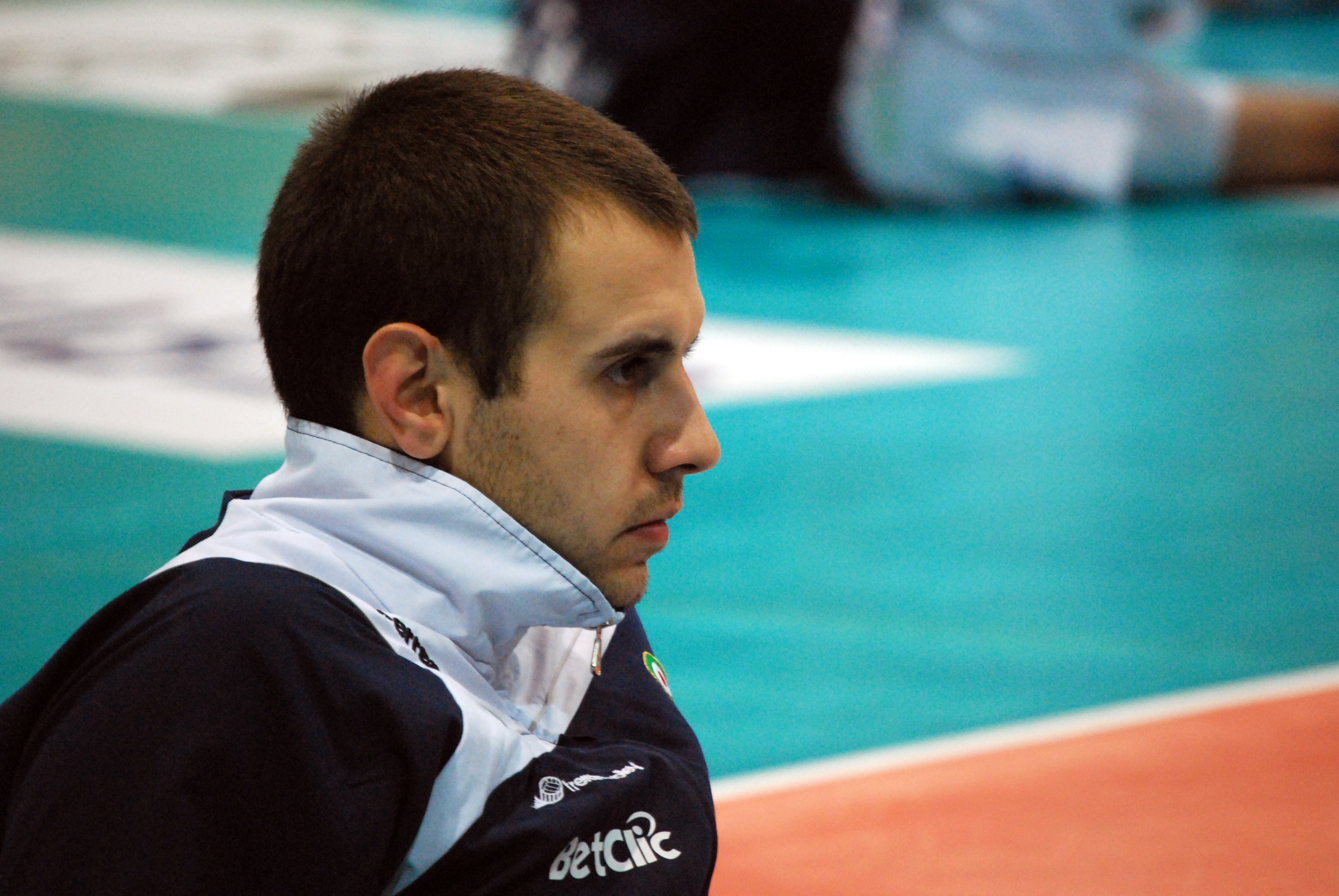

Personal information
- Nationality: Bulgaria
- Born: October 21, 1987 (age 39) Sofia, Bulgaria
- Height: 2.02 m (6 ft 8 in)
- Weight: 92 kg (203 lb)
- Spike: 347 cm (137 in)
- Block: 337 cm (133 in)

Volleyball information

National team
- Years: Team
- 2009-: Bulgaria
Medal record
Men's volleyball
Representing Bulgaria
European Games
Silver medal – second place	2015 Baku	Team competition

Valentin Bratoev (Bulgarian: Валентин Братоев; October 21, 1987 in Sofia) is a Bulgarian volleyball player a member of Bulgaria men's national volleyball team and Bulgarian volleyball club Deya Burgas. Bratoev won bronze medals with the national team in the 2009 Men's European Volleyball Championship and won 2010–11 CEV Champions League with Trentino. His twin brother Georgi Bratoev also plays volleyball for Bulgaria.

== Club ==
- (Bulgaria) Slavia Sofia (2002–2007)
- (Bulgaria) Levski Sofia (2007–2009)
- (Italy) Pallavolo Massa (2009–2010)
- (Italy) Trentino (2010–2011)
- (Italy) Callipo Vibo Valentia (2011–2011)
- (Italy) Argos Sora (2011–2012)
- (Qatar) Al-Rayyan (2012–2013)
- (Bulgaria) Levski Sofia (2012–2013)
- (Germany) Friedrichshafen (2013–2014)
- (France) GFC Ajaccio (2014–2015)
- (Iran) Shahrdari Tabriz (2015–2016)
- (Bulgaria) CSKA Sofia (2016–2017)
- (Bulgaria) Neftochimic 2010 (2017–2018)
- (Japan) JTEKT Stings (2018–2019)
- Al Arabi Qatar (2019–2020)
