= Svetoslav Gotsev =

Bulgarian volleyball player (born 1990)

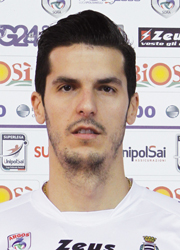
- Gotsev in 2016

Personal information
- Nationality: Bulgarian
- Born: 31 August 1990 (age 36); Breznik, Bulgaria
- Height: 2.05 m (6 ft 9 in)
- Weight: 97 kg (214 lb)
- Spike: 358 cm (141 in)
- Block: 335 cm (132 in)

Volleyball information
- Position: Middle blocker
- Current club: Levski Volley
- Number: 1

Career
Years	Teams
2009–2012; 2012–2013; 2013–2014; 2014–2015; 2015–2016; 2016–2017; 2017–2018; 2019-2020; 2026	Pirin Razlog; BluVolley Verona; VfB Friedrichshafen; Volley Milano; Shahrdari Tabriz; Dobrudja 07; Argos Volley Sora; Tours Volley; Dynamo LO-Saint Petersburg; Ural Ufa; Paris Volley; Levski Sofia

National team
2010–	Bulgaria
Honours
Men's volleyball
Representing Bulgaria
European Games
Silver medal – second place	2015 Baku	Team
- Last updated: 30 December 2017

Svetoslav Gotsev (Bulgarian: Светослав Гоцев, born 31 August 1990 in Breznik, Bulgaria) is a Bulgarian male volleyball player.

He was a member of the Bulgaria men's national volleyball team at the 2014 FIVB Volleyball Men's World Championship in Poland. He played for Dobrudja 07.
