= List of 2015 European Games medal winners =

The 2015 European Games were held in Baku, Azerbaijan, from 12 June 2015 to 28 June 2015. 5,898 athletes participated in 253 events in 20 sports.

== Archery ==
Event	Gold	Silver	Bronze
Men's Individual	Miguel Alvariño (ESP)	Sjef van den Berg (NED)	Anton Prilepov (BLR)
Men's Team	Ukraine; Heorhiy Ivanytskyy; Markiyan Ivashko; Viktor Ruban	Spain; Miguel Alvariño; Juan Ignacio Rodríguez; Antonio Fernández	Netherlands; Rick van der Ven; Sjef van den Berg; Mitch Dielemans
Women's Individual	Karina Winter (GER)	Maja Jager (DEN)	Alicia Marín (ESP)
Women's Team	Italy; Natalia Valeeva; Guendalina Sartori; Elena Tonetta	Belarus; Hanna Marusava; Ekaterina Timofeyeva; Alena Tolkach	Ukraine; Lidiia Sichenikova; Veronika Marchenko; Anastasia Pavlova
Mixed Team	Italy; Natalia Valeeva; Mauro Nespoli	Georgia; Khatuna Narimanidze; Lasha Pkhakadze	Ukraine; Lidiia Sichenikova; Heorhiy Ivanytskyy

== Athletics ==
Event	Gold	Silver	Bronze
Mixed team	Austria (AUT); Anita Baielr; Ekemini Bassey; Dominik Distelberger; Elisabeth Eberl; Michaela Egger; Nikolaus Franzmair; Markus Fuchs; Mario Gebhard; Benjamin Grill; Kira Grunberg; Christoph Haslauer; Stefanie Huber; Ina Huemer; Dominik Hufnagl; Thomas Kain; Matthias Kaserer; Julio Kellerer; Paul Kilbertus; Viola Kleiser; Josip Kopic; Anita Baielr; Sarah Lagger; Nina Luyer; Pamela Manzerdorfen; Gunther Matzinger; Gerhard Mayer; Verena Menapace; Elisabeth Niedereder; Valentin Pfeil; Verena Preiner; Brenton Rowe; Roman Schmied; Anita Baielr; Carina Schrempf; Beate Schrott; Julia Schwarzinger; Benjamin Siart; Julia Siart; Dominik Sedliaczek; Christian Smetana; Christian Steinhammer; Alexandra Toth; Andreas Vojta; Susanne Walli; Veronika Watzek; Thomas Weisshaindlinger; Jennifer Wenth; Eva-Maria Wimberger	Slovakia (SVK); Katarína Belová; Tomáš Benko; Katarína Berešová; Alexandra Bezeková; Andrej Bician; Jakub Bottlík; Matúš Bubeník; Tomáš Celko; Denis Danáč; Paula Habovštiaková; Andrea Holleyová; Martina Hrašnová; Anna Hrvolová; Alexander Jablokov; Zuzana Karaffová; Martin Koch; Lenka Kršáková; Martin Kučera; Veronika Lašová; Marcel Lomnický; Ľubomíra Maníková; Jakub Matúš; Lucia Mokrašová; Matúš Olej; Dušan Páleník; Jozef Pelikán; Michaela Pešková; Lukáš Prevalinec; Iveta Putálová; Jozef Repčík; Silvia Šalgovičová; Marek Šefránek; Lucia Slaničková; Patrícia Slosárová; Alexandra Šťuková; Ivona Tomanová; Roman Turčáni; Jozef Urban; Dana Velďáková; Jana Velďáková; Tomáš Veszelka; Juraj Vitko; Ján Volko; Monika Weigertová; Adam Zavacký; Pavol Ženčár; Patrik Ženúch; Ján Zmoray	Israel (ISR); Haimro Alame; Tomer Almogy; Girmaw Amare; Maya Aviezer; Noa Barlia; Etamar Bhastekar; Amit Cohen; Hai Cohen; Aviv Dayan; Olga Dogadgo; Margaryta Dorozhon; Alan Ferber; Muket Fetene; Dikla Goldenthal; Amir Hamidulin; Omri Harush; Hanna Knyazyeva-Minenko; Dmitry Kroytor; Shanie Landen; Olga Lenskiy; Itamar Levi; Danna Levin; Alexandra Lokshin; Dariya Lokshin; Anastasya Muchkayev; Noam Neeman; Imri Persiado; Margareta Pogorelov; Donald Sanford; Maor Seged; Maayan Furman-Shahaf; Itay Shamir; Azaunt Taka; Maor Tiyouri; Gilron Tsabkevich; Diana Vaisman; Kristina Vanyushev; Tom Yakubov; Evgenia Zabolotni; Victor Zagynayko; Efat Zelikovich

== Badminton ==
Event	Gold	Silver	Bronze
Men's singles	Pablo Abian (ESP)	Emil Holst (DEN)	Dieter Domke (GER)
Men's singles	Pablo Abian (ESP)	Emil Holst (DEN)	Kęstutis Navickas (LTU)
Men's doubles	Denmark; Mathias Boe; Carsten Mogensen	Russia; Ivan Sozonov; Vladimir Ivanov	Germany; Andreas Heinz; Raphael Beck
Men's doubles	Denmark; Mathias Boe; Carsten Mogensen	Russia; Ivan Sozonov; Vladimir Ivanov	Ireland; Sam Magee; Joshua Magee
Women's singles	Line Kjærsfeldt (DEN)	Lianne Tan (BEL)	Clara Azurmendi (ESP)
Women's singles	Line Kjærsfeldt (DEN)	Lianne Tan (BEL)	Petya Nedelcheva (BUL)
Women's doubles	Bulgaria; Stefani Stoeva; Gabriela Stoeva	Russia; Ekaterina Bolotova; Evgeniya Kosetskaya	Turkey; Özge Bayrak; Neslihan Yiğit
Women's doubles	Bulgaria; Stefani Stoeva; Gabriela Stoeva	Russia; Ekaterina Bolotova; Evgeniya Kosetskaya	Denmark; Lena Grebak; Maria Helsbøl
Mixed doubles	Denmark; Niclas Nøhr; Sara Thygesen	France; Gaëtan Mittelheisser; Audrey Fontaine	Ireland; Sam Magee; Chloe Magee
Mixed doubles	Denmark; Niclas Nøhr; Sara Thygesen	France; Gaëtan Mittelheisser; Audrey Fontaine	Germany; Raphael Beck; Kira Kattenbeck

== Basketball (3x3) ==
Event	Gold	Silver	Bronze
Men's	Russia	Spain	Serbia
Women's	Russia	Ukraine	Spain

== Beach soccer ==
Event	Gold	Silver	Bronze
Men's tournament	Russia	Italy	Portugal

== Boxing ==
=== Men's ===
Event	Gold	Silver	Bronze
49 kg	Bator Sagaluev; Russia	Brendan Irvine; Ireland	Muhammed Unlu; Turkey
49 kg	Bator Sagaluev; Russia	Brendan Irvine; Ireland	Dmytro Zamotayev; Ukraine
52 kg	Elvin Mamishzada; Azerbaijan	Vincenzo Picardi; Italy	Hamza Touba; Germany
52 kg	Elvin Mamishzada; Azerbaijan	Vincenzo Picardi; Italy	Viliam Tanko; Slovakia
56 kg	Bakhtovar Nazirov; Russia	Dzmitry Asanau; Belarus	Tayfur Aliyev; Azerbaijan
56 kg	Bakhtovar Nazirov; Russia	Dzmitry Asanau; Belarus	Qair Ashfaq; Great Britain
60 kg	Albert Selimov; Azerbaijan	Sofiane Oumiha; France	Seán McComb; Ireland
60 kg	Albert Selimov; Azerbaijan	Sofiane Oumiha; France	Mateusz Polski; Poland
64 kg	Collazo Sotomayor; Azerbaijan	Vincenzo Mangiacapre; Italy	Viktor Petrov; Ukraine
64 kg	Collazo Sotomayor; Azerbaijan	Vincenzo Mangiacapre; Italy	Kastriot Sopa; Germany
69 kg	Parviz Baghirov; Azerbaijan	Alexander Besputin; Russia	Josh Kelly; Great Britain
69 kg	Parviz Baghirov; Azerbaijan	Alexander Besputin; Russia	Yaroslav Samofalov; Ukraine
75 kg	Michael O'Reilly; Ireland	Xaybula Musalov; Azerbaijan	Maxim Koptyakov; Russia
75 kg	Michael O'Reilly; Ireland	Xaybula Musalov; Azerbaijan	Zoltán Harcsa; Hungary
81 kg	Teymur Mammadov; Azerbaijan	Valentino Manfredonia; Italy	Pavel Silyagin; Russia
81 kg	Teymur Mammadov; Azerbaijan	Valentino Manfredonia; Italy	Oleksandr Khyzhniak; Ukraine
91 kg	Abdulkadir Abdullayev; Azerbaijan	Gevorg Manukian; Ukraine	Sadam Magomedov; Russia
91 kg	Abdulkadir Abdullayev; Azerbaijan	Gevorg Manukian; Ukraine	Josip Bepo Filipi; Croatia
+91 kg	Joseph Joyce; Great Britain	Gasan Gimbatov; Russia	Tony Yoka; France
+91 kg	Joseph Joyce; Great Britain	Gasan Gimbatov; Russia	Mahammadrasul Majidov; Azerbaijan

=== Women's ===
Event	Gold	Silver	Bronze
51 kg	Nicola Adams; Great Britain	Sandra Drabik; Poland	Elif Coşkun; Turkey
51 kg	Nicola Adams; Great Britain	Sandra Drabik; Poland	Saiana Sagataeva; Russia
54 kg	Elena Saveleva; Russia	Marzia Davide; Italy	Anna Alimardanova; Azerbaijan
54 kg	Elena Saveleva; Russia	Marzia Davide; Italy	Azize Nimani; Germany
60 kg	Katie Taylor; Ireland	Estelle Mossely; France	Yana Alekseevna; Azerbaijan
60 kg	Katie Taylor; Ireland	Estelle Mossely; France	Tasheena Bugar; Germany
64 kg	Anastasiia Beliakova; Russia	Valentina Alberti; Italy	Sandy Ryan; Great Britain
64 kg	Anastasiia Beliakova; Russia	Valentina Alberti; Italy	Aneta Rygielska; Poland
75 kg	Nouchka Fontijn; Netherlands	Anna Laurell Nash; Sweden	Sarah Scheurich; Germany
75 kg	Nouchka Fontijn; Netherlands	Anna Laurell Nash; Sweden	Lidia Fidura; Poland

== Canoe sprint ==
=== Men ===
Event	Gold	Silver	Bronze
Men's C1 200m	Henrikas Žustautas; Lithuania	Valentin Demyanenko; Azerbaijan	Martin Fuksa; Czech Republic
Men's C1 1000m	Sebastian Brendel; Germany	Martin Fuksa; Czech Republic	Attila Vajda; Hungary
Men's C2 1000m	Andrei Bahdanovich; Aliaksandr Bahdanovich; Belarus	Alexey Korovashkov; Ilya Pervukhin; Russia	Peter Kretschmer; Michael Mueller; Germany
Men's K1 200m^{1}	Petter Menning; Sweden	Ed McKeever; Great Britain	Aleksejs Rumjancevs; Latvia Marko Dragosavljević; Serbia
Men's K1 1000m	Max Hoff; Germany	Fernando Pimenta; Portugal	Rene Holten Poulsen; Denmark
Men's K1 5000m	Max Hoff; Germany	Fernando Pimenta; Portugal	Cyrille Carré; France
Men's K2 200m	Nebojša Grujić; Marko Novaković; Serbia	Ronald Rauhe; Tom Liebscher; Germany	Sándor Tótka; Péter Molnár; Hungary
Men's K2 1000m	Zoltán Kammerer; Tamás Szalai; Hungary	Max Rendschmidt; Marcus Gross; Germany	Vitaliy Bialko; Raman Piatrushenka; Belarus
Men's K4 1000m	Zoltán Kammerer; Dávid Tóth; Tamás Kulifai; Dániel Pauman; Hungary	Alexandr Sergeev; Vasily Pogreban; Anton Ryakhov; Vladislav Blintcov; Russia	Pavel Miadzvedzeu; Aleh Yurenia; Vitaliy Bialko; Raman Piatrushenka; Belarus

Notes

1. Miklós Dudás of Hungary originally won the gold medal, but were later disqualified due to doping violations.

=== Women ===
Event	Gold	Silver	Bronze
Women's K1 200m	Marta Walczykiewicz; Poland	Natalia Podolskaya; Russia	Danuta Kozák; Hungary
Women's K1 500m	Danuta Kozák; Hungary	Yvonne Schuring; Austria	Ewelina Wojnarowska; Poland
Women's K1 5000m	Maryna Litvinchuk; Belarus	Lani Belcher; Great Britain	Renáta Csay; Hungary
Women's K2 200m	Marharyta Makhneva and Maryna Litvinchuk; Belarus	Nikolina Moldovan and Olivera Moldovan; Serbia	Mariya Povkh and Anastasiia Todorova; Ukraine
Women's K2 500m	Milica Starović; Dalma Ružičić-Benedek; Serbia	Roxana Borha; Elena Meroniac; Romania	Anna Kárász; Ninetta Vad; Hungary
Women's K4 1000m	Gabriella Szabó; Anna Kárász; Danuta Kozák; Ninetta Vad; Hungary	Franziska Weber; Verena Hantl; Conny Wassmuth; Tina Dietze; Germany	Karolina Naja; Ewelina Wojnarowska; Edyta Dzieniszewska-Kierkla; Beata Mikołajczyk; Poland

== Cycling ==
=== Road cycling ===
Event	Gold	Silver	Bronze
Men's road race	(Spain) Luis León Sánchez (ESP)	(Ukraine) Andriy Hryvko (UKR)	(Czech Republic) Petr Vakoc (CZE)
Women's road race	(Belarus) Alena Amialiusik (BLR)	(Poland) Katarzyna Niewiadoma (POL)	(Netherlands) Anna van der Breggen (NED)
Men's time trial	(Belarus) Vasil Kiryienka (BLR)	(Netherlands) Stef Clement (NED)	(Spain) Luis León Sánchez (ESP)
Women's time trial	(Netherlands) Ellen van Dijk (NED)	(Ukraine) Hanna Solovey (UKR)	(Netherlands) Annemiek van Vleuten (NED)

=== Mountain biking ===
Event	Gold	Silver	Bronze
Men's cross-country	(Switzerland) Nino Schurter (SUI)	(Switzerland) Lukas Flückiger (SUI)	(Switzerland) Fabian Giger (SUI)
Women's cross-country	(Switzerland) Jolanda Neff (SUI)	(Switzerland) Kathrin Stirnemann (SUI)	(Poland) Maja Włoszczowska (POL)

=== BMX ===
Event	Gold	Silver	Bronze
Men's BMX	(France) Joris Daudet (FRA)	(Netherlands) Twan van Gendt (NED)	(Switzerland) David Graf (SUI)
Women's BMX	(Denmark) Simone Christensen (DEN)	(France) Magalie Pottier (FRA)	(Czech Republic) Aneta Hladikova (CZE)

== Diving ==
=== Men ===
Event	Gold	Silver	Bronze
1 metre springboard	Nikita Shleikher (RUS)	Ilia Molchanov (RUS)	James Heatly (GBR)
3 metre springboard	James Heatly (GBR)	Ruslan Adriano Cristofori (ITA)	Ilia Molchanov (RUS)
3 metre synchronized springboard	Russia; Ilia Molchanov; Nikita Nikolaev	Great Britain; James Heatly; Ross Haslam	Germany; Frithjof Seidel; Nico Herzog
Platform	Matty Lee (GBR)	Nikita Shleikher (RUS)	Alexis Jandard (FRA)

=== Women ===
Event	Gold	Silver	Bronze
1 metre springboard	Maria Polykova (RUS)	Louisa Stawczynski (GER)	Diana Shelestyuk (UKR)
3 metre springboard	Katherine Torrance (GBR)	Ekaterina Nekrasova (RUS)	Saskia Oettinghaus (GER)
3 metre synchronized springboard	Louisa Stawczynski (GER); Saskia Oettinghaus (GER)	Maria Polykova (RUS); Elena Chernykh (RUS)	Diana Shelestyuk (UKR); Marharyta Dzhusova (UKR)
Platform	Lois Toulson (GBR)	Anna Chuinyshena (RUS)	Elena Wassen (GER)

== Fencing ==
=== Men's ===
Event	Gold	Silver	Bronze
Individual épée	Ivan Trevejo; France	Sergey Khodos; Russia	Daniel Jerent; France; Bartosz Piasecki; Norway
Team épée	France; Yannick Borel; Ronan Gustin; Daniel Jerent; Ivan Trevejo	Russia; Sergey Bida; Anton Glebko; Dmitriy Gusev; Sergey Khodos	Italy; Gabriele Bino; Gabriele Cimini; Marco Fichera; Andrea Santarelli
Individual foil	Alessio Foconi; Italy	Timur Arslanov; Russia	Jean-Paul Tony-Hélissey; France; Francesco Ingargiola; Italy
Team foil	Great Britain; Richard Kruse; Marcus Mepstead; Benjamin Peggs; Alex Tofalides	Italy; Alessio Foconi; Francesco Ingargiola; Lorenzo Nista; Damiano Rosatelli	Russia; Timur Arslanov; Aleksey Khovanskiy; Timur Safin; Dmitry Zherebchenko
Individual sabre	Andriy Yagodka; Ukraine	Tiberiu Dolniceanu; Romania	Luigi Miracco; Italy; Alberto Pellegrini; Italy
Team sabre	Italy; Luigi Miracco; Massimiliano Murolo; Alberto Pellegrini; Giovanni Repetti	Romania; Alin Badea; Mădălin Bucur; Tiberiu Dolniceanu; Iulian Teodosiu	Germany; Richard Hübers; Björn Hübner; Maximilian Kindler; Robin Schrödter

=== Women's ===
Event	Gold	Silver	Bronze
Individual épée	Ana Maria Brânză; Romania	Yana Zvereva; Russia	Simona Gherman; Romania; Erika Kirpu; Estonia
Team épée	Romania; Ana Maria Brânză; Simona Gherman; Simona Pop; Amalia Tătăran	Estonia; Julia Beljajeva; Irina Embrich; Erika Kirpu; Katrina Lehis	Italy; Camilla Batini; Brenda Briasco; Giulia Rizzi; Alberta Santuccio
Individual foil	Alice Volpi; Italy	Yana Alborova; Russia	Adelina Zagidullina; Russia; Valentina Cipriani; Italy
Team foil	Russia; Yana Alborova; Anastasia Ivanova; Diana Yakovlevna; Adelina Zagidullina	France; Gaëlle Gebet; Julie Huin; Chloé Jubenot; Jéromine Mpah Njanga	Italy; Chiara Cini; Valentina Cipriani; Carolina Erba; Alice Volpi
Individual sabre	Angelika Wątor; Poland	Sevil Bunyatova; Azerbaijan	Sevinc Bunyatova; Azerbaijan; Margaux Rifkiss; France
Team sabre	Ukraine; Olha Kharlan; Alina Komashchuk; Olena Kravatska; Olha Zhovnir	Italy; Sofia Ciaraglia; Martina Criscio; Rebecca Gargano; Caterina Navarria	Russia; Viktoriya Kovaleva; Yana Obvintseva; Mariya Ridel; Tatiana Sukhova

== Gymnastics ==
=== Acrobatic ===
==== Women's groups ====
Event	Gold	Silver	Bronze
All-around	Belgium; Kaat Dumarey; Julie Van Gelder; Ineke Van Schoor	Russia; Valeriia Belkina; Yulia Nikitina; Zhanna Parkhometc	Belarus; Katsiaryna Barysevich; Veranika Nabokina; Karina Sandovich
Balance	Belgium; Kaat Dumarey; Julie Van Gelder; Ineke Van Schoor	Russia; Valeriia Belkina; Yulia Nikitina; Zhanna Parkhometc	Belarus; Katsiaryna Barysevich; Veranika Nabokina; Karina Sandovich
Dynamic	Belgium; Kaat Dumarey; Julie Van Gelder; Ineke Van Schoor	Russia; Valeriia Belkina; Yulia Nikitina; Zhanna Parkhometc	Belarus; Katsiaryna Barysevich; Veranika Nabokina; Karina Sandovich

==== Mixed pairs ====
Event	Gold	Silver	Bronze
All-around	Russia; Marina Chernova; Georgy Pataraya	Belgium; Yana Vastavel; Solano Cassamajor	United Kingdom; Hannah Baughn; Ryan Bartlett
Balance	Russia; Marina Chernova; Georgy Pataraya	Belgium; Yana Vastavel; Solano Cassamajor	United Kingdom; Hannah Baughn; Ryan Bartlett
Dynamic	Russia; Marina Chernova; Georgy Pataraya	Belgium; Yana Vastavel; Solano Cassamajor	United Kingdom; Hannah Baughn; Ryan Bartlett

=== Aerobic ===
Event	Gold	Silver	Bronze
Mixed pairs	Spain; Sara Moreno; Vicente Lli	Italy; Michela Castoldi; Davide Donati	Russia; Dukhik Dzhanazian; Denis Soloev
Mixed groups	Hungary; Panna Szöllősi; Dóra Lendvay; Dóra Hegyi; Balázs Farkas; Dániel Bali	Romania; Lavinia Panaete; Bianca Gorgovan; Dacian Barna; Daniel Bocser; Lucian Savulescu	Spain; Belen Guillemot; Aranzazu Martínez; Sara Moreno; Vicente Lli; Pedro Moreno

=== Artistic gymnastics ===
==== Men's events ====
Event	Gold	Silver	Bronze
Team all-around	Russia; David Belyavskiy; Nikita Ignatyev; Nikolai Kuksenkov	Ukraine; Ihor Radivilov; Oleg Verniaiev; Mykyta Yermak	Azerbaijan; Petro Pakhnyuk; Oleh Stepko; Eldar Safarov
Individual all-around	Oleg Verniaiev (UKR)	Oleh Stepko (AZE)	Nikita Ignatyev (RUS)
Floor exercise	Rayderley Zapata (ESP)	Fabian Hambüchen (GER)	David Belyavskiy (RUS)
Horizontal bar	Fabian Hambüchen (GER)	Vlasios Maras (GRE)	Nikita Ignatyev (RUS)
Pommel horse	Sašo Bertoncelj (SLO)	Oleh Stepko (AZE)	Brinn Bevan (GBR)
Rings exercise	Eleftherios Petrounias (GRE)	Nikita Ignatyev (RUS)	İbrahim Çolak (TUR)
Vault	Oleg Verniaiev (UKR)	Casimir Schmidt (NED)	Oleh Stepko (AZE)
Parallel bars	Oleh Stepko (AZE)	David Belyavskiy (RUS)	Marius Berbecar (ROU)

==== Women's events ====
Event	Gold	Silver	Bronze
Team all-around	Russia; Aliya Mustafina; Viktoria Komova; Seda Tutkhalyan	Germany; Elisabeth Seitz; Sophie Scheder; Leah Griesser	Netherlands; Céline van Gerner; Lieke Wevers; Lisa Top
Individual all-around	Aliya Mustafina (RUS)	Giulia Steingruber (SUI)	Lieke Wevers (NED)
Vault	Giulia Steingruber (SUI)	Seda Tutkhalyan (RUS)	Lisa Top (NED)
Uneven bars	Aliya Mustafina (RUS)	Sophie Scheder (GER)	Andreea Iridon (ROU)
Balance beam	Lieke Wevers (NED)	Andreea Iridon (ROU)	Giulia Steingruber (SUI)
Floor	Giulia Steingruber (SUI)	Aliya Mustafina (RUS)	Lieke Wevers (NED)

=== Rhythmic gymnastics ===
==== Individual ====
Event	Gold	Silver	Bronze
All-around	Yana Kudryavtseva (RUS)	Margarita Mamun (RUS)	Melitina Staniouta (BLR)
Hoop	Margarita Mamun (RUS)	Melitina Staniouta (BLR)	Neta Rivkin (ISR)
Ball	Yana Kudryavtseva (RUS)	Ganna Rizatdinova (UKR)	Melitina Staniouta (BLR)
Clubs	Yana Kudryavtseva (RUS)	Ganna Rizatdinova (UKR)	Melitina Staniouta (BLR)
Ribbon	Yana Kudryavtseva (RUS)	Marina Durunda (AZE)	Salomé Pazhava (GEO)

==== Group ====
Event	Gold	Silver	Bronze
All-around	Russia; Diana Borisova; Daria Kleshcheva; Anastasiia Maksimova; Anastasiia Tatareva; Maria Tolkacheva; Sofya Skomorokh	Israel; Yuval Filo; Alona Koshevatskiy; Ekaterrina Levina; Karina Lykhvar; Ida Mayrin	Belarus; Ksenya Cheldishkina; Maria Kadobina; Aliaksandra Narkevich; Valeriya Pischelina; Arina Tsitsilina; Hanna Dudzenkova
Ribbons	Russia; Diana Borisova; Anastasiia Maksimova; Anastasiia Tatareva; Maria Tolkacheva; Sofya Skomorokh	Ukraine; Olena Dmytrash; Yevgeniya Gomon; Oleksandra Gridasova; Valeriia Gudym; Anastasiya Voznyak	Israel; Yuval Filo; Alona Koshevatskiy; Ekaterrina Levina; Karina Lykhvar; Ida Mayrin
Clubs and hoops	Belarus; Ksenya Cheldishkina; Maria Kadobina; Valeriya Pischelina; Arina Tsitsilina; Hanna Dudzenkova	Israel; Yuval Filo; Alona Koshevatskiy; Ekaterrina Levina; Karina Lykhvar; Ida Mayrin	Ukraine; Olena Dmytrash; Yevgeniya Gomon; Oleksandra Gridasova; Valeriia Gudym; Anastasiya Voznyak

=== Trampoline ===
Event	Gold	Silver	Bronze
Men's individual	Dmitry Ushakov (RUS)	Uladzislau Hancharou (BLR)	Ilya Grishunin (AZE)
Men's synchronized	Russia; Dmitry Ushakov; Mikhail Melnik	Belarus; Uladzislau Hancharou; Mikalai Kazak	Germany; Martin Gromowski; Kyrylo Sonn
Women's individual	Yana Pavlova (RUS)	Katherine Driscoll (GBR)	Hanna Harchonak (BLR)
Women's synchronized	Russia; Yana Pavlova; Anna Kornetskaya	France; Marine Jurbert; Joëlle Vallez	Portugal; Beatriz Martins; Ana Rente

== Judo ==
=== Men's events ===
Event	Gold	Silver	Bronze
60 kg	Beslan Mudranov; Russia	Orkhan Safarov; Azerbaijan	Ludovic Chammartin; Switzerland
60 kg	Beslan Mudranov; Russia	Orkhan Safarov; Azerbaijan	Amiran Papinashvili; Georgia
66 kg	Kamal Khan-Magomedov; Russia	Loïc Korval; France	Mikhail Pulyaev; Russia
66 kg	Kamal Khan-Magomedov; Russia	Loïc Korval; France	Sebastian Seidl; Germany
73 kg	Sagi Muki; Israel	Nugzar Tatalashvili; Georgia	Rok Drakšič; Slovenia
73 kg	Sagi Muki; Israel	Nugzar Tatalashvili; Georgia	Dirk van Tichelt; Belgium
81 kg	Avtandili Tchrikishvili; Georgia	Ivan Nifontov; Russia	Alexander Wierczeczak; Germany
81 kg	Avtandili Tchrikishvili; Georgia	Ivan Nifontov; Russia	Loïc Pietri; France
90 kg	Kirill Denisov; Russia	Varlam Liparteliani; Georgia	Ilias Iliadis; Greece
90 kg	Kirill Denisov; Russia	Varlam Liparteliani; Georgia	Guillaume Elmont; Netherlands
100 kg	Henk Grol; Netherlands	Lukáš Krpálek; Czech Republic	Toma Nikiforov; Belgium
100 kg	Henk Grol; Netherlands	Lukáš Krpálek; Czech Republic	Cyrille Maret; France
+100 kg	Adam Okruashvili; Georgia	Or Sasson; Israel	Renat Saidov; Russia
+100 kg	Adam Okruashvili; Georgia	Or Sasson; Israel	Iakiv Khammo; Ukraine
Team	France; Pierre Duprat; Alexandre Iddir; Loic Korval; David Larose; Cyrille Maret; Loic Pietri; Florent Urani	Georgia; Beka Gviniashvili; Varlam Liparteliani; Ushangi Margiani; Levani Matiashvili; Adam Okruashvili; Amiran Papinashvili; Lasha Shavdatuashvili; Nugzar Tatalashvili; Avtandili Tchrikishvili	Russia; Kirill Denisov; Denis Iartcev; Kamal Khan-Magomedov; Alan Khubetsov; Ivan Nifontov; Mikhail Pulyaev; Renat Saidov; Kirill Voprosov
Team	France; Pierre Duprat; Alexandre Iddir; Loic Korval; David Larose; Cyrille Maret; Loic Pietri; Florent Urani	Georgia; Beka Gviniashvili; Varlam Liparteliani; Ushangi Margiani; Levani Matiashvili; Adam Okruashvili; Amiran Papinashvili; Lasha Shavdatuashvili; Nugzar Tatalashvili; Avtandili Tchrikishvili	Ukraine; Serhiy Drebot; Vitalii Dudchyk; Oleksandr Gordiienko; Iakiv Khammo; Artem Khomula; Quedjau Nhabali; Vadym Synyavsky; Georgii Zantaraia
Visually impaired +90 kg	Ilham Zakiyev; Azerbaijan	Oleksandr Pominov; Ukraine	Aleksandr Parasiuk; Russia
Visually impaired +90 kg	Ilham Zakiyev; Azerbaijan	Oleksandr Pominov; Ukraine	Zakir Mislimov; Azerbaijan

=== Women's events ===
Event	Gold	Silver	Bronze
48 kg	Charline van Snick; Belgium	Ebru Sahin; Turkey	Éva Csernoviczki; Hungary
48 kg	Charline van Snick; Belgium	Ebru Sahin; Turkey	Irina Dolgova; Russia
52 kg<	Andreea Chițu; Romania	Annabelle Euranie; France	Mareen Kräh; Germany
52 kg<	Andreea Chițu; Romania	Annabelle Euranie; France	Natalia Kuziutina; Russia
57 kg	Telma Monteiro; Portugal	Hedvig Karakas; Hungary	Nora Gjakova; Kosovo
57 kg	Telma Monteiro; Portugal	Hedvig Karakas; Hungary	Miryam Roper; Germany
63 kg	Martyna Trajdos; Germany	Tina Trstenjak; Slovenia	Yarden Gerbi; Israel
63 kg	Martyna Trajdos; Germany	Tina Trstenjak; Slovenia	Clarisse Agbegnenou; France
70 kg	Kim Polling; Netherlands	Laura Vargas Koch; Germany	Bernadette Graf; Austria
70 kg	Kim Polling; Netherlands	Laura Vargas Koch; Germany	Szaundra Diedrich; Germany
78 kg	Marhinde Verkerk; Netherlands	Luise Malzahn; Germany	Anamari Velenšek; Slovenia
78 kg	Marhinde Verkerk; Netherlands	Luise Malzahn; Germany	Guusje Steenhuis; Netherlands
+78 kg	Emilie Andeol; France	Jasmin Külbs; Germany	Belkıs Zehra Kaya; Turkey
+78 kg	Emilie Andeol; France	Jasmin Külbs; Germany	Svitlana Yaromka; Ukraine
Team	France; Clarisse Agbegnenou; Emilie Andeol; Laetitia Blot; Gévrise Émane; Annabelle Euranie; Marie Eve Gahie; Madeleine Malonga; Automne Pavia	Germany; Szaundra Diedrich; Franziska Konitz; Mareen Kraeh; Luise Malzahn; Miryam Roper; Martyna Trajdos; Laura Vargas Koch; Viola Waechter	Italy; Giulia Cantoni; Assunta Galeone; Odette Giuffrida; Edwige Gwend; Elisa Marchio; Valentina Moscatt; Giulia Quintavalle
Team	France; Clarisse Agbegnenou; Emilie Andeol; Laetitia Blot; Gévrise Émane; Annabelle Euranie; Marie Eve Gahie; Madeleine Malonga; Automne Pavia	Germany; Szaundra Diedrich; Franziska Konitz; Mareen Kraeh; Luise Malzahn; Miryam Roper; Martyna Trajdos; Laura Vargas Koch; Viola Waechter	Slovenia; Klara Apotekar; Vlora Bedeti; Nina Milošević; Petra Nareks; Anka Pogacnik; Tina Trstenjak; Anamari Velenšek; Kristina Vrsic
Visually impaired 57 kg	Inna Cherniak; Ukraine	Sabina Abdullayeva; Azerbaijan	Nataliya Nikolaychyk; Ukraine
Visually impaired 57 kg	Inna Cherniak; Ukraine	Sabina Abdullayeva; Azerbaijan	Romona Brussig; Germany

== Karate ==
=== Men ===
Event	Gold	Silver	Bronze
Kata	Damián Quintero; Spain	Mattia Busato; Italy	Mehmet Yakan; Turkey
60 kg	Firdovsi Farzaliyev; Azerbaijan	Luca Maresca; Italy	Emil Pavlov; Macedonia
67 kg	Burak Uygur; Turkey	Steven Da Costa; France	Niyazi Aliyev; Azerbaijan
75 kg	Rafael Aghayev; Azerbaijan	Luigi Busà; Italy	Erman Eltemur; Turkey
84 kg	Aykhan Mamayev; Azerbaijan	Michail Georgos Tzanos; Greece	Uğur Aktaş; Turkey
84+ kg	Enes Erkan; Turkey	Jonathan Horne; Germany	Martin Nestorovski; Macedonia

=== Women ===
Event	Gold	Silver	Bronze
Kata	Sandra Sánchez; Spain	Sandy Scordo; France	Dilara Bozan; Turkey
50 kg	Serap Özçelik; Turkey	Bettina Plank; Austria	Alexandra Recchia; France
55 kg	Emily Thouy; France	Jelena Kovačević; Croatia	Ilaha Gasimova; Azerbaijan
61 kg	Lucie Ignace; France	Merve Çoban; Turkey	Ana Lenard; Croatia
68 kg	Irina Zaretska; Azerbaijan	Alisa Theresa Buchinger; Austria	Marina Raković; Montenegro
68+ kg	Maša Martinović; Croatia	Meltem Hocaoğlu; Turkey	Ivanna Zaytseva; Russia

== Sambo ==
=== Men's events ===
Event	Gold	Silver	Bronze
57 kg	Aymergen Atkunov; Russia	Islam Gasumov; Azerbaijan	Uladzislau Burdz; Belarus
57 kg	Aymergen Atkunov; Russia	Islam Gasumov; Azerbaijan	Vakhtangi Chidrashvili; Georgia
74 kg	Stsiapan Papou; Belarus	Amil Gasimov; Azerbaijan	Kakha Mamulashvili; Georgia
74 kg	Stsiapan Papou; Belarus	Amil Gasimov; Azerbaijan	Azamat Sidakov; Russia
90 kg	Alsim Chernoskulov; Russia	Andrei Kazusionak; Belarus	Davit Karbelashvili; Georgia
90 kg	Alsim Chernoskulov; Russia	Andrei Kazusionak; Belarus	Radvila Matukas; Lithuania
+100 kg	Artem Osipenko; Russia	Vasif Safarbayov; Azerbaijan	Yury Rybak; Belarus
+100 kg	Artem Osipenko; Russia	Vasif Safarbayov; Azerbaijan	Razmik Tonoyan; Ukraine

=== Women's events ===
Event	Gold	Silver	Bronze
52 kg	Anna Kharitonova; Russia	Nazakat Khalilova; Azerbaijan	Magdalena Varbanova; Bulgaria
52 kg	Anna Kharitonova; Russia	Nazakat Khalilova; Azerbaijan	Ruta Aksionova; Lithuania
60 kg	Yana Kostenko; Russia	Kalina Stefanova; Bulgaria	Katsiaryna Prakapenka; Belarus
60 kg	Yana Kostenko; Russia	Kalina Stefanova; Bulgaria	Daniela Hondiu; Romania
64 kg	Tatsiana Matsko; Belarus	Olena Sayko; Ukraine	Anna Shcherbakova; Russia
64 kg	Tatsiana Matsko; Belarus	Olena Sayko; Ukraine	Sarah Loko; France
-68 kg	Ivana Jandrić; Serbia	Volha Namazava; Belarus	Celine Conde; France
-68 kg	Ivana Jandrić; Serbia	Volha Namazava; Belarus	Olga Zakhartsova; Russia

== Shooting ==
=== Men's events ===
Event	Gold	Silver	Bronze
10 metre air pistol	Damir Mikec; Serbia	João Costa; Portugal	Juraj Tužinský; Slovakia
25 metre rapid fire pistol	Christian Reitz; Germany	Alexei Klimov; Russia	Oliver Geis; Germany
50 metre pistol	Damir Mikec; Serbia	Pavol Kopp; Slovakia	Yusuf Dikeç; Turkey
10 metre air rifle	Vitali Bubnovich; Belarus	Niccolò Campriani; Italy	Sergey Richter; Israel
50 metre rifle prone	Henri Junghänel; Germany	Marco de Nicolo; Italy	Sergei Martynov; Belarus
50 metre rifle three positions	Valérian Sauveplane; France	Petar Gorsa; Croatia	Vitali Bubnovich; Belarus
Skeet	Valerio Luchini; Italy	Stefan Nilsson; Sweden	Marko Kemppainen; Finland
Trap	Alexey Alipov; Russia	Erik Varga; Slovakia	Giovanni Pellielo; Italy
Double trap	Vitaly Fokeev; Russia	Richárd Bognár; Hungary	Antonino Barillà; Italy

=== Women's events ===
Event	Gold	Silver	Bronze
10 metre air pistol	Zorana Arunović; Serbia	Sonia Franquet; Spain	Viktoria Chaika; Belarus
25 metre pistol	Heidi Diethelm Gerber; Switzerland	Antoaneta Boneva; Bulgaria	Monika Karsch; Germany
10 metre air rifle	Andrea Arsović; Serbia	Sarah Hornung; Switzerland	Barbara Engleder; Germany
50 metre rifle three positions	Petra Zublasing; Italy	Laurence Brize; France	Olivia Hofmann; Austria
Skeet	Amber Hill; Great Britain	Diana Bacosi; Italy	Chiara Cainero; Italy
Trap	Fátima Gálvez; Spain	Arianna Perilli; San Marino	Elena Tkach; Russia

=== Mixed events ===
Event	Gold	Silver	Bronze
10 metre air pistol	Germany (GER); Christian Reitz; Monika Karsch	Greece (GRE); Konstantinos Malgarinos; Anna Korakaki	Russia (RUS); Vladimir Gontcharov; Ekaterina Korshunova
10 meter air rifle	Italy (ITA); Niccolò Campriani; Petra Zublasing	Denmark (DEN); Steffen Olsen; Stine Nielsen	Russia (RUS); Sergey Kruglov; Daria Vdovina
Skeet	Italy (ITA); Valerio Luchini; Diana Bacosi	Cyprus (CYP); Georgios Achilleos; Andri Eleftheriou	France (FRA); Anthony Terras; Lucie Anastassiou
Trap	Slovakia (SVK); Erik Varga; Zuzana Štefečeková	Russia (RUS); Alexey Alipov; Elena Tkach	San Marino (SMR); Manuel Mancini; Alessandra Perilli

== Swimming ==
=== Men's events ===
Event	Gold		Silver		Bronze	
50 m freestyle	Ziv Kalontorov; Israel	22.16	Giovanni Izzo; Italy	22.51	Aleksei Brianskii; Russia	22.69
100 m freestyle	Duncan Scott; Great Britain	49.43	Alessandro Miressi; Italy	50.03	Vladislav Kozlov; Russia	50.11
200 m freestyle	Duncan Scott; Great Britain	1:48.55	Cameron Kurle; Great Britain	1:48.92	Elisei Stepanov; Russia	1:49.64
400 m freestyle	Paul Hentschel; Germany	3:52.43	Dimitrios Dimitriou; Greece	3:52.57	Ernest Maksumov; Russia	3:52.65
800 m freestyle	Nicolas D'Oriano; France	7:59.87	Marcus Rodriguez Mesa; Spain	8:01.73	Henning Muehlleitner; Germany	8:04.33
1500 m freestyle	Nicolas D'Oriano; France	15:13.31	Ernest Maksumov; Russia	15:13.90	Marc Hinawi; Israel	15:25.63
50 m backstroke	Filipp Shopin; Russia	25.40	Marek Ulrich; Germany	25.44	Andrii Khlopsov; Ukraine	25.71
100 m backstroke	Luke Greenbank; Great Britain	54.76	Filipp Shopin; Russia	54.81	Marek Ulrich; Germany	55.35
200 m backstroke	Luke Greenbank; Great Britain	1:56.89 WJR	Mikita Tsymyh; Belarus	1:59.46	Roman Larin; Russia	1:59.60
50 m breaststroke	Andrius Sidlaukas; Lithuania	27.81	Nikola Obravac; Croatia	27.89	Tobias Bjerg; Denmark	28.04
100 m breaststroke	Anton Chupkov; Russia	1:00.65 WJR	Andrius Sidlaukas; Lithuania	1:01.42	Charlie Attwood; Great Britain	1:01.71
200 m breaststroke	Anton Chupkov; Russia	2:10.85	Kirill Mordashev; Russia	2:12.94	Luke Davies; Great Britain	2:13.45
50 m butterfly	Andrii Khloptsov; Ukraine	23.92	Paweł Sendyk; Poland	23.97	Daniil Pakhomov; Russia	24.02
100 m butterfly	Daniil Pakhomov; Russia	52.72	Alberto Lozano Mateos; Spain	52.78	Daniil Antipov; Russia	53.36
200 m butterfly	Daniil Pakhomov; Russia	1:57.04	Gianco Carini; Italy	1:57.46	Matthias Marsau; France	1:58.96
200 m individual medley	Steffan Sebastian; Austria	2:01.39	Jarvis Parkinson; Great Britain	2:01.94	Martyn Walton; Great Britain	2:02.24
400 m individual medley	Nikolay Sokolov; Russia	4:19.44	Igor Balyberdin; Russia	4:20.80	Karol Zbutowicz; Poland	4:22.22
4 × 100 m freestyle relay	Great Britain; Duncan Scott; Martyn Walton; Daniel Speers; Cameron Kurle	3:19.38	Italy; Alessandro Miressi; Giovanni Izzo; Ivano Vendrame; Alessandro Bori	3:20.19	Russia; Vladislav Kozlov; Aleksei Brianskii; Elisei Stepanov; Igor Shadrin	3:20.22
4 × 200 m freestyle relay	Russia; Aleksandr Prokofev; Nikolay Snegirev; Ernest Maksumov; Elisei Stepanov	7:16.08	Great Britain; Duncan Scott; Martyn Walton; Kyle Chisholm; Cameron Kurle	7:19.36	Germany; Paul Hentschel; Henning Muehlleitner; Konstantin Walter; Moritz Brandt	7:20.77
4 × 100 m medley relay	Russia; Filipp Shopin; Anton Chupkov; Daniil Pakhomov; Vladislav Kozlov	3:36.38 WJR	Great Britain; Luke Greenbank; Charlie Attwood; Duncan Scott; Martyn Walton	3:39.01	Poland; Jakub Daniel Skierka; Jacek Janusz Arentewicz; Michał Chudy; Paweł Sendyk	3:39.31

=== Women's events ===
Event	Gold		Silver		Bronze	
50 m freestyle	Mariia Kameneva; Russia	25.23	Marrit Steenbergen; Netherlands	25.27	Julie Jensen; Denmark	25.41
100 m freestyle	Marrit Steenbergen; Netherlands	53.97	Arina Openysheva; Russia	54.45	Mariia Kameneva; Russia	55.19
200 m freestyle	Arina Openysheva; Russia	1:58.22	Marrit Steenbergen; Netherlands	1:58.99	Leonie Kullmann; Germany	1:59.77
400 m freestyle	Arina Openysheva; Russia	4:08.91	Leonie Kullmann; Germany	4:12.16	Anastasiia Kirpichnikova; Russia	4:13.13
800 m freestyle	Holly Hibbott; Great Britain	8:39.02	Anastasiia Kirpichnikova; Russia	8:39.73	Marina Castro Atalaya; Spain	8:45.51
1500 m freestyle	Sveva Schiazzano; Italy	16:40.17	Janka Juhász; Hungary	16:40.39	Marina Castro Atalaya; Spain	16:46.16
50 m backstroke	Caroline Pilhatsch; Austria	28.60	Pauline Mahieu; France	28.70	Mariia Kameneva; Russia	28.77
100 m backstroke	Polina Egorova; Russia	1:01.19	Mariia Kameneva; Russia	1:01.23	Pauline Mahieu; France	1:01.34
200 m backstroke	Polina Egorova; Russia	2:11.23	Maxime Wolters; Germany	2:11.38	Maryna Kolesynkova; Ukraine	2:11.91
50 m breaststroke	Maria Astashkina; Russia	31.58	Laura Kelsch; Germany	31.87	Nolwenn Herve; France	32.08
100 m breaststroke	Maria Astashkina; Russia	1:07.71	Giuila Verona; Italy	1:08.61	Daria Chikunova; Russia	1:09.02
200 m breaststroke	Maria Astashkina; Russia	2:23.06 WJR	Giuila Verona; Italy	2:25.91	Layla Black; Great Britain	2:27.61
50 m butterfly	Polina Egorova; Russia	26.82	Caroline Pilhatsch; Austria	27.18	Julie Jensen; Denmark	27.19
100 m butterfly	Polina Egorova; Russia	59.36	Amelia Clynes; Great Britain	1:00.22	Ilketra Varvara Lebl; Greece; Laura Stephens (GBR)	1:00.54
200 m butterfly	Julia Mrozinski; Germany	2:11.19	Elisa Scrapa Vidal; Italy	2:12.27	Boglárka Bonecz; Hungary	2:12.42
200 m individual medley	Maxime Wolters; Germany	2:13.37	Ilaria Cusinato; Italy	2:13.78	Abbie Wood; Great Britain	2:14.49
400 m individual medley	Abbie Wood; Great Britain	4:41.97	Ilaria Cusinato; Italy	4:44.01	Anja Crevar; Serbia	4:45.84; NR
4 × 100 m freestyle relay	Russia; Arina Openysheva; Vasilissa Buinaia; Olesia Cherniatina; Mariia Kameneva	3:43.63	Netherlands; Pien Schravesande; Frederique Janssen; Laura van Engelen; Marrit Steenbergen	3:44.10	Great Britain; Darcy Deakin; Madeleine Crompton; Hannah Featherstone; Georgia Coates	3:45.80
4 × 200 m freestyle relay	Russia; Anastasiia Kirpichnikova; Arina Openysheva; Olesia Cherniatina; Irina Krivonogova	8:03.45	Netherlands; Laura van Engelen; Frederique Janssen; Marieke Tienstra; Marrit Steenbergen	8:04.65	Great Britain; Hannah Featherstone; Darcy Deakin; Holly Hibbott; Georgia Coates	8:04.84
4 × 100 m medley relay	Russia; Mariia Kameneva; Maria Astashkina; Polina Egorova; Arina Openysheva	4:03.22 WJR	Netherlands; Iris Tjonk; Tes Schouten; Josein Wijkhuis; Marrit Steenbergen	4:07.99	Great Britain; Rebecca Sherwin; Layla Black; Amelia Clynes; Georgia Coates	4:09.10

=== Mixed events ===
Event	Gold		Silver		Bronze	
4 × 100 m freestyle relay	Russia; Vladislav Kozlov; Elisei Stepanov; Mariia Kameneva; Arina Openysheva	3:30.30	Great Britain; Duncan Scott; Martyn Walton; Darcy Deakin; Georgia Coates	3:32.65	Germany; Alexander Lohmar; Leonie Kullmann; Katrin Gottwald; Konstantin Walter	3:33.74
4 × 100 m medley relay	Russia; Mariia Kameneva; Anton Chupkov; Daniil Pakhomov; Arina Openysheva	3:49.53	Great Britain; Luke Greenbank; Charlie Attwood; Amelia Cyles; Georgia Coates	3:52.03	Germany; Maxine Wolters; Leo Schmidt; Johannes Tesch; Katrin Gottwald	3:54.27

== Synchronised swimming ==
Event	Gold	Silver	Bronze
Solo	Russia (RUS); Anisiya Neborako	Spain (ESP); Berta Ferreras Sanz	Austria (AUT); Anna-Maria Alexandri
Duet	Russia (RUS); Valeriya Filenkova; Daria Kulagina	Austria (AUT); Anna-Maria Alexandri; Eirini-Marina Alexandri	Ukraine (UKR); Yana Nariezhna; Yelyzaveta Yakhno
Team	Russia (RUS); Valeria Filenkova; Mayya Gurbanberdieva; Veronika Kalinina; Daria Kulagina; Anna Larkina; Anisiya Neborako; Mariia Nemchinova; Maria Salmina; Anastasia Arkhipovskaia; Elizaveta Ovchinnikova	Spain (ESP)Julia Echeberria Esquivel; Berta Ferreras Sanz; Helena Jauma Lluch; Carmen Juarez Campos; Emilia Luboslavova Boneva; Raquel Estefania; Itziar Sanchez; Irene Toledano Carmelo; Sara Saldana Lopez; Lidia Vigara Rodrigo	Ukraine (UKR); Valeriia Aprieleva; Valeriya Berezhna; Veronika Gryshko; Yana Nariezhna; Alina Shynkarenko; Kateryna Tkachova; Yelyzaveta Yakhno; Anna Yesipova
Free combination	Russia (RUS); Valeria Filenkova; Mayya Gurbanberdieva; Veronika Kalinina; Daria Kulagina; Anna Larkina; Anisiya Neborako; Mariia Nemchinova; Maria Salmina; Anastasia Arkhipovskaia; Elizaveta Ovchinnikova	Spain (ESP); Julia Echeberria Esquivel; Berta Ferreras Sanz; Helena Jauma Lluch; Carmen Juarez Campos; Emilia Luboslavova Boneva; Raquel Estefania; Itziar Sanchez; Irene Toledano Carmelo; Sara Saldana Lopez; Lidia Vigara Rodrigo	Ukraine (UKR); Valeriia Aprieleva; Valeriya Berezhna; Veronika Gryshko; Yana Nariezhna; Alina Shynkarenko; Kateryna Tkachova; Yelyzaveta Yakhno; Anna Yesipova

== Table tennis ==
Event	Gold	Silver	Bronze
Men's singles	(Germany) Dimitrij Ovtcharov (GER)	(Belarus) Vladimir Samsonov (BLR)	(Ukraine) Lei Kou (UKR)
Men's team	Portugal; João Geraldo; Tiago Apolonia; Marcos Freitas	France; Adrien Mattenet; Simon Gauzy; Emmanuel Lebesson	Austria; Robert Gardos; Stefan Fegerl; Daniel Habesohn
Women's singles	(Netherlands) Li Jiao (NED)	(Netherlands) Li Jie (NED)	(Turkey) Melek Hu (TUR)
Women's team	Germany; Han Ying; Petrissa Solja; Shan Xiaona	Netherlands; Li Jie; Li Jiao; Britt Eerland	Czech Republic; Hana Matelová; Renáta Štrbíková; Iveta Vacenovská

== Taekwondo ==
=== Men ===
Event	Gold	Silver	Bronze
58 kg	Rui Bragança; Portugal	Jesús Tortosa; Spain	Si Mohamed Ketbi; Belgium
58 kg	Rui Bragança; Portugal	Jesús Tortosa; Spain	Levent Tuncat; Germany
68 kg	Aykhan Taghizade; Azerbaijan	Karol Robak; Poland	Joel González; Spain
68 kg	Aykhan Taghizade; Azerbaijan	Karol Robak; Poland	Aleksey Denisenko; Russia
80 kg	Milad Beigi; Azerbaijan	Albert Gaun; Russia	Lutalo Muhammad; Great Britain
80 kg	Milad Beigi; Azerbaijan	Albert Gaun; Russia	Júlio Ferreira; Portugal
+80 kg	Radik Isayev (AZE)	Vladislav Larin (RUS)	Vedran Golec (CRO)
+80 kg	Radik Isayev (AZE)	Vladislav Larin (RUS)	Daniel Ros Gomez (ESP)

=== Women ===
Event	Gold	Silver	Bronze
49 kg	Charlie Maddock; Great Britain	Tijana Bogdanović; Serbia	Patimat Abakarova; Azerbaijan
49 kg	Charlie Maddock; Great Britain	Tijana Bogdanović; Serbia	Lucija Zaninović; Croatia
57 kg	Jade Jones; Great Britain	Ana Zaninović; Croatia	Nikita Glasnović; Sweden
57 kg	Jade Jones; Great Britain	Ana Zaninović; Croatia	Eva Calvo; Spain
67 kg	Anastasia Baryshnikova; Russia	Farida Azizova; Azerbaijan	Elin Johansson; Sweden
67 kg	Anastasia Baryshnikova; Russia	Farida Azizova; Azerbaijan	Nur Tatar; Turkey
+67 kg	Gwladys Epangue (FRA)	Milica Mandić (SRB)	Iva Radoš (CRO)
+67 kg	Gwladys Epangue (FRA)	Milica Mandić (SRB)	Olga Ivanova (RUS)

== Triathlon ==
Event	Gold	Silver	Bronze
Men's	(United Kingdom) Gordon Benson (GBR)	(Portugal) João Silva (POR)	(Azerbaijan) Rostyslav Pevtsov (AZE)
Women's	(Switzerland) Nicola Spirig (SUI)	(Netherlands) Rachel Klamer (NED)	(Sweden) Lisa Nordén (SWE)

== Volleyball ==
Event	Gold	Silver	Bronze
Men's indoor	Germany; Christian Fromm; Sebastian Kühner; Denys Kaliberda; Marcus Böhme; Jochen Schöps (captain); Lukas Kampa; Ferdinand Tille; Tom Strohbach; Tim Broshog; Jan Zimmermann; Michael Andrei; Björn Höhne; Matthias Pompe; Falko Steinke	Bulgaria; Georgi Bratoev; Rozalin Penchev; Martin Bozhilov; Svetoslav Gotsev; Velizar Chernokozhev; Branimir Grozdanov; Dobromir Dimitrov; Valentin Bratoev; Jani Jeliazkov; Todor Aleksiev (captain); Nikolay Nikolov; Borislav Apostolov; Ventsislav Ragin; Petar Karakashev	Russia; Ilia Vlasov; Dmitry Kovalev (captain); Ivan Demakov; Igor Kobzar; Alexander Markin; Igor Filippov; Alexey Kabeshov; Alexander Kimerov; Dmitrii Volkov; Victor Poletaev; Maksim Zhigalov; Egor Kliuka; Sergey Nikitin; Roman Bragin
Women's indoor	Turkey; Çağla Akın; Kübra Akman; Seda Aslanyürek; Naz Aydemir; Dicle Nur Babat; Büşra Cansu; Merve Dalbeler; Meliha İsmailoğlu; Aslı Kalaç; Gizem Güreşen Karadayı; Güldeniz Önal Paşalıoğlu (C); Neriman Özsoy; Polen Uslupehlivan; Gözde Yılmaz	Poland; Anna Werblińska; Maja Tokarska; Izabela Bełcik (C); Agnieszka Kąkolewska; Agnieszka Bednarek-Kasza; Anna Miros; Katarzyna Zaroślińska; Agata Sawicka; Daria Paszek; Sylwia Pycia; Agata Durajczyk; Joanna Wołosz; Natalia Kurnikowska; Katarzyna Skowrońska-Dolata	Serbia; Maja Savić; Marta Drpa; Bojana Živković; Mina Popović; Tijana Malešević; Brižitka Molnar; Brankica Mihajlović; Jelena Nikolić (C); Ana Bjelica; Jovana Stevanović; Milena Rašić; Silvija Popović; Slađana Mirković; Bianka Buša
Men's beach	Latvia; Martins Plavins; Haralds Regza	Russia; Yaroslav Koshkarev; Dmitry Barsouk	Czech Republic; Premysl Kubala; Jan Hadrava
Women's beach	Switzerland; Nicole Eiholzer; Nina Betschart	Austria; Lena Maria Plesiutschnig; Katharina Schutzenhofer	Lithuania; Ieva Dumbauskaite; Monika Povilaityte

== Water polo ==
Event	Gold	Silver	Bronze
Men's	Serbia	Spain	Greece
Women's	Russia	Spain	Greece

== Wrestling ==
=== Men's freestyle ===
Event	Gold	Silver	Bronze
57 kg	Viktor Lebedev; Russia	Marcel Ewald; Germany	Alexandru Chirtoaca; Moldova
57 kg	Viktor Lebedev; Russia	Marcel Ewald; Germany	Sezar Akgül; Turkey
61 kg	Aleksandr Bogomoev; Russia	Beka Lomtadze; Georgia	Haji Aliyev; Azerbaijan
61 kg	Aleksandr Bogomoev; Russia	Beka Lomtadze; Georgia	Vasyl Shuptar; Ukraine
65 kg	Toghrul Asgarov; Azerbaijan	Frank Chamizo; Italy	Mustafa Kaya; Turkey
65 kg	Toghrul Asgarov; Azerbaijan	Frank Chamizo; Italy	Ilyas Bekbulatov; Russia
70 kg	Magomedrasul Gazimagomedov; Russia	Magomedmurad Gadzhiev; Poland	Yakup Gör; Turkey
70 kg	Magomedrasul Gazimagomedov; Russia	Magomedmurad Gadzhiev; Poland	Ruslan Dibirgadjiyev; Azerbaijan
74 kg	Aniuar Geduev; Russia	Soner Demirtaş; Turkey	Jabrayil Hasanov; Azerbaijan
74 kg	Aniuar Geduev; Russia	Soner Demirtaş; Turkey	Jumber Kvelashvili; Georgia
86 kg	Abdulrashid Sadulaev; Russia	Piotr Ianulov; Moldova	Radosław Marcinkiewicz; Poland
86 kg	Abdulrashid Sadulaev; Russia	Piotr Ianulov; Moldova	Sandro Aminashvili; Georgia
97 kg	Khetag Gazyumov; Azerbaijan	Elizbar Odikadze; Georgia	Valeriy Andriytsev; Ukraine
97 kg	Khetag Gazyumov; Azerbaijan	Elizbar Odikadze; Georgia	Abdusalam Gadisov; Russia
125 kg	Taha Akgül; Turkey	Aleksei Shemarov; Belarus	Geno Petriashvili; Georgia
125 kg	Taha Akgül; Turkey	Aleksei Shemarov; Belarus	Jamaladdin Magomedov; Azerbaijan

=== Men's Greco-Roman ===
Event	Gold	Silver	Bronze
59 kg	Stepan Maryanyan; Russia	Soslan Daurov; Belarus	Elman Mukhtarov; Azerbaijan
59 kg	Stepan Maryanyan; Russia	Soslan Daurov; Belarus	Tarik Belmadani; France
66 kg	Artem Surkov; Russia	Migran Arutyunyan; Armenia	Hasan Aliyev; Azerbaijan
66 kg	Artem Surkov; Russia	Migran Arutyunyan; Armenia	Istvan Levai; Slovakia
71 kg	Rasul Chunayev; Azerbaijan	Bálint Korpási; Hungary	Dominik Etlinger; Croatia
71 kg	Rasul Chunayev; Azerbaijan	Bálint Korpási; Hungary	Frank Stäbler; Germany
75 kg	Elvin Mursaliyev; Azerbaijan	Viktor Nemeš; Serbia	Chingiz Labazanov; Russia
75 kg	Elvin Mursaliyev; Azerbaijan	Viktor Nemeš; Serbia	Dmytro Pyshkov; Ukraine
80 kg	Evgeny Saleev; Russia	Rafig Huseynov; Azerbaijan	Daniel Aleksandrov; Bulgaria
80 kg	Evgeny Saleev; Russia	Rafig Huseynov; Azerbaijan	Viktar Sasunouski; Belarus
85 kg	Davit Chakvetadze; Russia	Zhan Beleniuk; Ukraine	Metehan Basar; Turkey
85 kg	Davit Chakvetadze; Russia	Zhan Beleniuk; Ukraine	Ramsin Azizsir; Germany
98 kg	Islam Magomedov; Russia	Dmytro Timchenko; Ukraine	Melonin Noumonvi; France
98 kg	Islam Magomedov; Russia	Dmytro Timchenko; Ukraine	Cenk İldem; Turkey
130 kg	Rıza Kayaalp; Turkey	Sabah Shariati; Azerbaijan	Heiki Nabi; Estonia
130 kg	Rıza Kayaalp; Turkey	Sabah Shariati; Azerbaijan	Ioseb Chugoshvili; Belarus

=== Women's freestyle ===
Event	Gold	Silver	Bronze
48 kg	Mariya Stadnyk; Azerbaijan	Elitsa Yankova; Bulgaria	Iwona Matkowska; Poland
48 kg	Mariya Stadnyk; Azerbaijan	Elitsa Yankova; Bulgaria	Valentina Islamova; Russia
53 kg	Anzhela Dorogan; Azerbaijan	Roksana Zasina; Poland	Merve Kenger; Turkey
53 kg	Anzhela Dorogan; Azerbaijan	Roksana Zasina; Poland	Nadzeya Shushko; Belarus
55 kg	Sofia Mattsson; Sweden	Katarzyna Krawczyk; Poland	Evelina Nikolova; Bulgaria
55 kg	Sofia Mattsson; Sweden	Katarzyna Krawczyk; Poland	Nataliya Synyshyn; Azerbaijan
58 kg	Emese Barka; Hungary	Tetyana Lavrenchuk; Ukraine	Elif Jale Yesilirmak; Turkey
58 kg	Emese Barka; Hungary	Tetyana Lavrenchuk; Ukraine	Grace Bullen; Norway
60 kg	Marianna Sastin; Hungary	Svetlana Lipatova; Russia	Veranika Ivanova; Belarus
60 kg	Marianna Sastin; Hungary	Svetlana Lipatova; Russia	Taybe Yusein; Bulgaria
63 kg	Valeriia Lazinskaia; Russia	Yuliya Tkach; Ukraine	Anastasija Grigorjeva; Latvia
63 kg	Valeriia Lazinskaia; Russia	Yuliya Tkach; Ukraine	Maryia Mamashuk; Belarus
69 kg	Alina Stadnik; Ukraine	Ilana Kratysh; Israel	Natalia Vorobieva; Russia
69 kg	Alina Stadnik; Ukraine	Ilana Kratysh; Israel	Aline Focken; Germany
75 kg	Vasilisa Marzaliuk; Belarus	Ekaterina Bukina; Russia	Maider Unda; Spain
75 kg	Vasilisa Marzaliuk; Belarus	Ekaterina Bukina; Russia	Svetlana Saenko; Moldova
