= Belgium at the European Games =

- IOC code: BEL
- NOC: Belgian Olympic and Interfederal Committee
- Website: teambelgium.be
- Medals: Gold 10 Silver 10 Bronze 10 Total 30

European Games appearances (overview)
- 2015; 2019; 2023; 2027

Belgium participated at the inaugural edition of the European Games in 2015.

== Medal tables ==
=== Medals by Games ===
Games	Athletes	Gold	Silver	Bronze	Total	Rank
(Azerbaijan) 2015 Baku	117	4	4	3	11	15
(Belarus) 2019 Minsk	56	4	1	1	6	14
(Poland) 2023 Kraków	140	2	5	6	13	28
(Turkey) 2027 Istanbul	Future event					
Total		10	10	10	30	20

=== Medals by sports ===
Sport	Gold	Silver	Bronze	Total
Gymnastics	6	4	0	10
Judo	2	0	3	5
Muaythai	1	1	1	3
Taekwondo	1	0	1	2
Athletics	0	2	1	3
Boxing	0	1	1	2
3x3 basketball	0	1	0	1
Badminton	0	1	0	1
Fencing	0	0	1	1
Karate	0	0	1	1
Triathlon	0	0	1	1
Totals (11 entries)	10	10	10	30

== List of medallists ==
Medal	Name(s)	Games	Sport	Event
Gold	Kaat Dumarey; Julie Van Gelder; Ineke Van Schoor	(Azerbaijan) 2015 Baku	Gymnastics	Women's acrobatics groups all-around
Gold	Kaat Dumarey; Julie Van Gelder; Ineke Van Schoor	(Azerbaijan) 2015 Baku	Gymnastics	Women's acrobatics groups balance
Gold	Kaat Dumarey; Julie Van Gelder; Ineke Van Schoor	(Azerbaijan) 2015 Baku	Gymnastics	Women's acrobatics groups dynamic
Gold	Charline Van Snick	(Azerbaijan) 2015 Baku	Judo	Women's 48 kg
Gold	Talia De Troyer; Britt Vanderdonckt; Charlotte Van Royen	(Belarus) 2019 Minsk	Gymnastics	Women's acrobatics groups dynamic
Gold	Talia De Troyer; Britt Vanderdonckt; Charlotte Van Royen	(Belarus) 2019 Minsk	Gymnastics	Women's acrobatics groups all-around
Gold	Nina Derwael	(Belarus) 2019 Minsk	Gymnastics	Women's balance beam
Gold	Matthias Casse	(Belarus) 2019 Minsk	Judo	Men's 81 kg
Gold	Gianny De Leu	(Poland) 2023 Kraków	Muaythai	Men's 60 kg
Gold	Sarah Chaâri	(Poland) 2023 Kraków	Taekwondo	Women's 62 kg
Silver	Solano Cassamajor; Yana Vastavel	(Azerbaijan) 2015 Baku	Gymnastics	Mixed acrobatics pairs all-around
Silver	Solano Cassamajor; Yana Vastavel	(Azerbaijan) 2015 Baku	Gymnastics	Mixed acrobatics pairs balance
Silver	Solano Cassamajor; Yana Vastavel	(Azerbaijan) 2015 Baku	Gymnastics	Mixed acrobatics pairs dynamic
Silver	Lianne Tan	(Azerbaijan) 2015 Baku	Badminton	Women's singles
Silver	Talia De Troyer; Britt Vanderdonckt; Charlotte Van Royen	(Belarus) 2019 Minsk	Gymnastics	Women's acrobatics groups balance
Silver	Bryan De Valck; Caspar Augustijnen; Denis Donkor; Thibaut Vervoort	(Poland) 2023 Kraków	3x3 basketball	Men's tournament
Bronze	Si Mohamed Ketbi	(Azerbaijan) 2015 Baku	Taekwondo	Men's 58 kg
Bronze	Dirk Van Tichelt	(Azerbaijan) 2015 Baku	Judo	Men's 73 kg
Bronze	Toma Nikiforov	(Azerbaijan) 2015 Baku	Judo	Men's 100 kg
Bronze	Jorre Verstraeten	(Belarus) 2019 Minsk	Judo	Men's 60 kg

== See also ==
- Belgium at the Olympics
