= Belgium at the 2015 European Games =

- IOC code: BEL
- NOC: Belgian Olympic and Interfederal Committee
- Website: teambelgium.be

in Baku, Azerbaijan 12 – 28 June 2015
- Competitors: 117 in 14 sports
- Flag bearers: Lionel Cox (opening); Lianne Tan (closing)
- Medals Ranked 15th: Gold 4 Silver 4 Bronze 3 Total 11

European Games appearances (overview)
- 2015; 2019; 2023; 2027

Belgium competed at the 2015 European Games, in Baku, Azerbaijan from 12 to 28 June 2015.

== Medalists ==
Medal	Name	Sport	Event	Date
Gold	Kaat Dumarey; Julie Van Gelder; Ineke Van Schoor	Gymnastics	Women's acrobatics groups all-around	19 June
Gold	Kaat Dumarey; Julie Van Gelder; Ineke Van Schoor	Gymnastics	Women's acrobatics groups balance	21 June
Gold	Kaat Dumarey; Julie Van Gelder; Ineke Van Schoor	Gymnastics	Women's acrobatics groups dynamic	21 June
Gold	Charline Van Snick	Judo	Women's 48 kg	25 June
Silver	Solano Cassamajor; Yana Vastavel	Gymnastics	Mixed acrobatics pairs all-around	19 June
Silver	Solano Cassamajor; Yana Vastavel	Gymnastics	Mixed acrobatics pairs balance	21 June
Silver	Solano Cassamajor; Yana Vastavel	Gymnastics	Mixed acrobatics pairs dynamic	21 June
Silver	Lianne Tan	Badminton	Women's singles	28 June
Bronze	Si Mohamed Ketbi	Taekwondo	Men's 58 kg	16 June
Bronze	Dirk Van Tichelt	Judo	Men's 73 kg	26 June
Bronze	Toma Nikiforov	Judo	Men's 100 kg	27 June

== Archery ==
Athlete	Event	Ranking round		Round of 64	Round of 32	Round of 16	Quarterfinals	Semifinals	Final / BM	
Athlete	Event	Score	Seed	Opposition Score	Opposition Score	Opposition Score	Opposition Score	Opposition Score	Opposition Score	Rank
Robin Ramaekers	Men's individual	661	21	Bozlar (TUR); W 4–6	Alvarino Garcia (ESP); L 6–0	Did not advance				17

== Badminton ==
Men

Athlete	Event	Group Stage				Elimination	Quarterfinal	Semifinal	Final / BM	
Athlete	Event	Opposition Score	Opposition Score	Opposition Score	Rank	Opposition Score	Opposition Score	Opposition Score	Opposition Score	Rank
Yuhan Tan	Men's singles	Krausz (Hungary); W 0–2	Evans (Republic of Ireland); L 2–0	Charalambidis (Greece); W 0–2	2	Rogalski (Poland); W 2–0	Navickas (Lithuania); L 0–2	Did not advance		
Matijs Dierickx; Freek Golinski	Men's doubles	L Mihaylov; M Mihaylov (Bulgaria); W 0–2	Natarov; Pochtarev (Ukraine); W 0–2	Bochat; Pietryja (Poland); W 2–0	1	—	J. Magee; S. Magee (Republic of Ireland); L 2–1	Did not advance		

Women

Athlete	Event	Group Stage				Elimination	Quarterfinal	Semifinal	Final / BM	
Athlete	Event	Opposition Score	Opposition Score	Opposition Score	Rank	Opposition Score	Opposition Score	Opposition Score	Opposition Score	Rank
Lianne Tan	Women's singles	Sefere (Latvia); W 0–2	Tolmoff (Estonia); W 1–2	Magee (Republic of Ireland); L 2–1	2	Gavnholt (Czech Republic); W 0–2	Lansac (France); W 1–2	Azurmendi (Spain); W 1–2	Kjærsfeldt (Denmark); L 2–1	2nd place, silver medalist(s)
Steffi Annys; Flore Vandenhoucke	Women's doubles	Pope; Sefere (Latvia); W 0–2	G Stoeva; S Stoeva (Bulgaria); L 2–0	Voytsekh; Zharka (Ukraine); W 0–2	2	—	Grebak; Helsbøl (Denmark); L 1–2	Did not advance		

Mixed

Athlete	Event	Group Stage				Quarterfinal	Semifinal	Final / BM	
Athlete	Event	Opposition Score	Opposition Score	Opposition Score	Rank	Opposition Score	Opposition Score	Opposition Score	Rank
Steffi Annys; Floris Oleffe	Mixed doubles	Bukart; Schaller (Switzerland); L 2–1	Vislova; Durkin (Russia); L 2–0	Wojtkowska; Pietryja (Poland); L 0–2	4	Did not advance			

== Basketball ==
Men

Athlete	Event	Group Stage				1/8 final	Quarterfinal	Semifinal	Final / BM	
Athlete	Event	Opposition Score	Opposition Score	Opposition Score	Rank	Opposition Score	Opposition Score	Opposition Score	Opposition Score	Rank
Nick Celis; Anthony Chada; Domien Loubry; Thierry Mariën	Men's 3x3	(Russia); L 21–12	(Turkey); W 20–21	(Spain); L 20–13	3	(Greece); L 21–12	Did not advance			

Women

Athlete	Event	Group Stage				1/8 final	Quarterfinal	Semifinal	Final / BM	
Athlete	Event	Opposition Score	Opposition Score	Opposition Score	Rank	Opposition Score	Opposition Score	Opposition Score	Opposition Score	Rank
Hind Ben Abdelkader; Sara Leemans; Anne-Sophie Strubbe; Ann Wauters	Women's 3x3	(Turkey); W 9–19	(Czech Republic); L 19–15	(Ukraine); L 12–17	3	(Slovenia); L 14–11	Did not advance			

== Boxing ==
Men

Athlete	Event	Round of 32	Round of 16	Quarterfinals	Semifinals	Final	
Athlete	Event	Opposition Result	Opposition Result	Opposition Result	Opposition Result	Opposition Result	Rank
Dodji Kodjo Ayigah	56 kg	Tanko (Slovakia); L 3–0 WP	Did not advance				
Anas Messaoudi	69 kg	Belous (Moldova); L 2–1 WP	Did not advance				

== Canoe Sprint ==
Men

Athlete	Event	Heats		Semifinals		Final	
Athlete	Event	Time	Rank	Time	Rank	Time	Rank
Jonathan Delombaerde	K1 200 m	35.891	4 Q	34.997	2 FA	36.850	9
Laurens Pannecoucke	K1 1000 m	3:35.673	4 Q	3:29.689	5 FB	3:36.092	12
Laurens Pannecoucke	K1 5000 m	—				21:29.569	8

Women

Athlete	Event	Heats		Semifinals		Final	
Athlete	Event	Time	Rank	Time	Rank	Time	Rank
Lize Broeckx	K1 500 m	1:55.326	4 Q	1:53.113	8 FB	2:08.829	13
Lize Broeckx	K1 5000 m	—				23:30.600	6

== Cycling ==
=== Road ===
Men

Athlete	Event	Time	Rank
Tiesj Benoot	Road race	DNF	
Tom Boonen	Road race	5:27:29	6
Bart De Clercq	Road race	5:33:56	43
Jens Keukeleire	Road race	5:28:26	19
Stijn Vandenbergh	Road race	DNF	
Maarten Wynants	Road race	DNF	

Women

Athlete	Event	Time	Rank
Ann-Sophie Duyck	Road race	3:34:09	48
Ann-Sophie Duyck	Time trial	34:05.21	7
Jessie Daams	Road race	3:25:53	16
Sofie De Vuyst	Road race	3:25:53	12
Kelly Druyts	Road race	3:34:09	43
Kaat Hannes	Road race	3:34:09	51

=== Mountain biking ===
Athlete	Event	Time	Rank
Jeff Luyten	Men's cross country	DNF	
Sven Nys	Men's cross country	1:52.31	23

=== BMX ===
Men

Athlete	Event	Qualifying Time Trial		Time Trial Super Final		Motos		Semifinal		Final	
Athlete	Event	Result	Rank	Result	Rank	Points	Rank	Result	Rank	Result	Rank
Ghinio Van De Weyer	Men's BMX	35.556	24	Did not advance		18	6	Did not advance			

Women

Athlete	Event	Qualifying Time Trial		Time Trial Super Final		Motos		Final	
Athlete	Event	Result	Rank	Result	Rank	Points	Rank	Result	Rank
Jone Vangoidsenhoven	Women's BMX	Did not start							
Elke Vanhoof	Women's BMX	37.274	1	26.628	1	7	3	51.360	7

== Fencing ==
Men

Athlete	Event	Group Stage						Round of 32	Round of 16	Quarterfinal	Semifinal	Final / BM	
Athlete	Event	Opposition Score	Opposition Score	Opposition Score	Opposition Score	Opposition Score	Rank	Opposition Score	Opposition Score	Opposition Score	Opposition Score	Opposition Score	Rank
Seppe Van Holsbeke	Individual sabre	Bucur (Romania); W 3–5	Motorin (Russia); W 0–5	Singer (Hungary); L 5–4	Repetti (Italy); W 4–5	Yagodka (Ukraine); W 3–5	1	Willau (Austria); W 8–15	Casares (Spain); L 15–14	Did not advance			

Women

Athlete	Event	Group Stage						Round of 32	Round of 16	Quarterfinal	Semifinal	Final / BM	
Athlete	Event	Opposition Score	Opposition Score	Opposition Score	Opposition Score	Opposition Score	Rank	Opposition Score	Opposition Score	Opposition Score	Opposition Score	Opposition Score	Rank
Delphine Groslambert	Individual foil	Volpi (Italy); L 5–1	Schmitz (Germany); W 1–5	Karamete (Turkey); L 5–1	Gebet (France); W 2–5	Dajcic (Croatia); W 2–5	3	Erba (Italy); L 15–4	Did not advance				
Alexandra Gevaert	Individual sabre	Pascu (Romania); L 5–2	Zhovnir (Ukraine); L 5–2	Kovaleva (Russia); L 5–1	Itzkowitz (United Kingdom); L 5–2	Bunyatova (Azerbaijan); L 5–3	6	Did not advance					

== Gymnastics ==
=== Acrobatic ===
Team

Athlete	Event	Qualification				Final			
Athlete	Event	Discipline		Total	Rank	Discipline		Total	Rank
Athlete	Event	B	D	Total	Rank	B	D	Total	Rank
Kaat Dumarey	Women's group all-around								
Julie Van Gelder	Women's group all-around								
Ineke Van Schoor	Women's group all-around								
Total	Women's group all-around								
Solano Cassamajor	Mixed pair all-around								
Yana Vastavel	Mixed pair all-around								
Total	Mixed pair all-around								

=== Artistic ===
Men
Team

Athlete	Event	Qualification								Final							
Athlete	Event	Apparatus						Total	Rank	Apparatus						Total	Rank
Athlete	Event	F	PH	R	V	PB	HB	Total	Rank	F	PH	R	V	PB	HB	Total	Rank
Gilles Gentges	Team																
Luka Van Den Keybus	Team																
Jimmy Verbaeys	Team																
Total	Team	27.499	25.433	26.433	27.332	27.766	28.266	162.729	18	Did not advance							

Women
Team

Athlete	Event	Qualification						Final					
Athlete	Event	Apparatus				Total	Rank	Apparatus				Total	Rank
Athlete	Event	F	V	UB	BB	Total	Rank	F	V	UB	BB	Total	Rank
Gaelle Mys	Team												
Cindy Vandenhole	Team												
Lisa Verschueren	Team												
Total	Team												

=== Trampoline ===
Belgium qualified one athlete based on the results at the 2014 European Trampoline Championships.

Athlete	Event	Qualification		Final	
Athlete	Event	Score	Rank	Score	Rank
Ben Van Overberghe	Men's individual	92.755	18	Did not advance	

== Judo ==
Men

Athlete	Event	Round of 64	Round of 32	Round of 16	Quarterfinals	Semifinals	Repechage	Final / BM	
Athlete	Event	Opposition Result	Opposition Result	Opposition Result	Opposition Result	Opposition Result	Opposition Result	Opposition Result	Rank
Senne Wyns	Men's −60 kg	DNS							
Jasper Lefevere	Men's −66 kg	—	Lazea (ROM); W 000s1–000	Seidl (GER); L 100–000	Did not advance				
Kenneth Van Gansbeke	Men's −66 kg	—	Oates (GBR); L 001–000	Did not advance					
Sami Chouchi	Men's −73 kg	Shoka (BLR); L 010–000	Did not advance						
Dirk Van Tichelt	Men's −73 kg	Bye	Szwarnowiecki (POL); W 000–100	Uematsu (ESP); W 000s1–000	Gusic (ALB); W 000–100	Tatalashvili (GEO); L 010–000	—	Elmont (NED); W 000–010	3rd place, bronze medalist(s)
Joachim Bottieau	Men's −81 kg	Ivanov (BUL); L 100–000	Did not advance						
Toma Nikiforov	Men's −100 kg	—	Cirjenics (HUN); W 000–100	Di Guida (ITA); W 000–100	Krpalek (CZE); L 000–000s1	—	Frey (GER); W 001–100	Fonseca (POR); W 100–000	3rd place, bronze medalist(s)
Benjamin Harmegnies	Men's +100 kg	—	Khammo (UKR); L 010–000	Did not advance					

Women

Athlete	Event	Round of 32	Round of 16	Quarterfinals	Semifinals	Repechage	Final / BM	
Athlete	Event	Opposition Result	Opposition Result	Opposition Result	Opposition Result	Opposition Result	Opposition Result	Rank
Charline Van Snick	Women's −48 kg	Bye	Aliyeva (AZE); W 000–100	Lokmanhekim (TUR); W 000–101	Dolgova (RUS); W 000–100	—	Sahin (TUR); W 000–001	1st place, gold medalist(s)
Ilse Heylen	Women's −52 kg	Guiffrida (ITA); L 000–000s1	Did not advance					
Lola Mansour	Women's −70 kg	Odzelashvili (GEO); W 000–101	Klys (POL); L 101–000	Did not advance				
Roxane Taeymans	Women's −70 kg	Mirzazada (AZE); W 000–101	Polling (NED); L 100–000	Did not advance				
Sofie De Saedelaere	Women's −78 kg	Bye	Steenhuis (NED); L 101–000	Did not advance				

== Karate ==
Athlete	Event	Elimination pool			Semifinals	Final / BM	
Athlete	Event	Opposition Score	Opposition Score	Opposition Score	Opposition Score	Opposition Score	Rank
Nele De Vos	Women's 61 kg	Colomar Costa (ESP); W 0–1	Ignace (FRA); L 2–0	Ristić (SLO); L 7–0	Did not advance		

== Shooting ==
Men

Athlete	Event	Qualification		Final	
Athlete	Event	Points	Rank	Points	Rank
Lionel Cox	50 m rifle prone	613,5	19	Did not advance	

Women

Athlete	Event	Qualification		Final	
Athlete	Event	Points	Rank	Points	Rank
Manon Hamblenne	10 m air pistol	366	30	Did not advance	
Manon Hamblenne	25 m air pistol				
Stephanie Vercrusse	10 m air rifle	403.7	37	Did not advance	
Stephanie Vercrusse	50 m rifle 3 positions	568	29	Did not advance	

== Swimming ==
Men

Athlete	Events	Heat		Semifinal		Final	
Athlete	Events	Time	Rank	Time	Rank	Time	Rank
Alexis Borisavljevic	100 m freestyle	51.29	5 Q	51.15	7	Did not advance	
Alexis Borisavljevic	200 m freestyle	1:52.55	6	Did not advance			
Valentin Borisavljevic	100 m freestyle	51.64	5	Did not advance			
Valentin Borisavljevic	200 m freestyle	1:51.83	2 q	1.52.90	6	Did not advance	
Basten Caerts	100 m breaststroke	1:02.68	3 Q	1:02.34	2 Q	1:02.28	6
Basten Caerts	200 m breaststroke	2:15.47	2 Q	2:13.76	4 Q	2:14.68	6
Thomas Dal	200 m individual medley	2:08.72	9	Did not advance			
Thomas Dal	400 m individual medley	4:25.67	9	—		Did not advance	
Thomas Thijs	100 m freestyle	51.34	7	Did not advance			
Thomas Thijs	200 m freestyle	1:51.96	4 q	1:54.29	8	Did not advance	
Alexander Trap	200 m freestyle	1:54.36	9	Did not advance			
Alexander Trap	400 m freestyle	4:02.09	8	—		Did not advance	
Dries Vangoetshoven	100 m freestyle	52.06	7	Did not advance			
Dries Vangoetshoven	50 m butterfly	24.70	8 Q	24.73	7	Did not advance	
Dries Vangoetshoven	100 m butterfly	55.09	4 q	54.28	5 q	54.16	8
Logan Vanhuys	200 m butterfly	2:10.71	10	Did not advance			
Logan Vanhuys	400 m individual medley	4:39.56	9	—		Did not advance	
Logan Vanhuys	400 m freestyle	4:01.03	7	—		Did not advance	
Logan Vanhuys	800 m freestyle	8:21.91	7	—		Did not advance	
Alexis Borisavljevic; Valentine Borisavljevic; Thomas Thijs; Dries Vangoetsenhoven	4×100 m freestyle relay	3:24.71	3 Q	—		3:24.18	7
Alexis Borisavljevic; Valentine Borisavljevic; Thomas Thijs; Alexander Trap	4×200 m freestyle relay	7:29.91	q	—		7:26.95	6

Women

Athlete	Events	Heat		Semifinal		Final	
Athlete	Events	Time	Rank	Time	Rank	Time	Rank
Lotte Goris	200 m individual medley	2:19.67	4 Q	2:19.67	5	Did not advance	
Lotte Goris	400 m individual medley	4:54.30	3 Q	—		4:54.48	7
Lotte Goris	100 m freestyle	57.58	5 Q	56.38	2 Q	57.12	6
Lise Michels	100 m breaststroke	1:12.09	6 q	1:12.30	7	Did not advance	
Lise Michels	200 m breaststroke	2:34.99	5 q	2:35.25	4	Did not advance	

== Table tennis ==
Men

Athlete	Event	Round 1	Round 2	Last 16	Quarterfinals	Semifinals	Final / BM	
Athlete	Event	Opposition Result	Opposition Result	Opposition Result	Opposition Result	Opposition Result	Opposition Result	Rank
Cédric Nuytinck	Singles	Kreanga (GRE); L 4–3	Did not advance					
Jean-Michel Saive	Singles	Skachkov (RUS); W 1–4	Karlsson (SWE); L 4–1	Did not advance				

Women

Athlete	Event	Round 1	Round 2	Last 16	Quarterfinals	Semifinals	Final / BM	
Athlete	Event	Opposition Result	Opposition Result	Opposition Result	Opposition Result	Opposition Result	Opposition Result	Rank
Lisa Lung	Singles	Ni (NED); L 4–0	Did not advance					

== Taekwondo ==
Men

Athlete	Event	Preliminaries	Quarterfinals	Semifinals	Final / BM	
Athlete	Event	Opposition Result	Opposition Result	Opposition Result	Opposition Result	Rank
Si Mohamed Ketbi	58 kg	Rodzik (POL); W 6–18 PTG	Cater (GBR); W 3–13 PTF	Braganca (POR); L 11–4 PTF	Mammadov (AZE); W 4–5 GDP	3rd place, bronze medalist(s)
Jaouad Achab	68 kg	Treviso (ITA); L 13–10 PTF	Did not advance			

Women

Athlete	Event	Preliminaries	Quarterfinals	Semifinals	Repechage	Final	
Athlete	Event	Opposition Result	Opposition Result	Opposition Result	Opposition Result	Opposition Result	Rank
Indra Craen	49 kg	Bogdanovic (SRB); L 5–9 PTF	Did not advance		Zaninovic (CRO); L 7–3 PTF	Did not advance	

== Triathlon ==
Men

Athlete	Event	Swim (1.5 km)	Trans 1	Bike (40 km)	Trans 2	Run (10 km)	Total Time	Rank
Peter Denteneer	Men's Triathlon	19:36	0:43	57:34	0:23	35:29	1:53:45	30

Women

Athlete	Event	Swim (1.5 km)	Trans 1	Bike (40 km)	Trans 2	Run (10 km)	Total Time	Rank
Charlotte Deldaele	Women's Triathlon	20:43	0:48	1:06:21	0:32	39:27	2:07:42	24
Sofie Hooghe	Women's Triathlon	21:52	0:53	1:05:10	0:31	39:00	2:07:26	22
Claire Michel	Women's Triathlon	21:51	0:48	1:05:21	0:29	35:41	2:04:10	8

== Volleyball ==
Both the men's team and women's team have qualified.

=== Men's tournament ===
Group play

Pool B
Russia
Italy
Bulgaria
Germany
Belgium
Slovakia

=== Women's tournament ===
Group play

Pool A
Azerbaijan
Italy
Turkey
Poland
Belgium
Romania
