= Cycling at the 2015 European Games – Women's BMX =

Women's BMX at the 2015 European Games
- Venue: BMX Velopark
- Date: 26, 28 June
- Competitors: 14 from 11 nations
- Winning time: 37.074

Medalists
gold medal	Simone Christensen	Denmark
silver medal	Magalie Pottier	France
bronze medal	Aneta Hladíková	Czech Republic

The women's BMX event at the 2015 European Games in Baku took place on 26 and 28 June.

== Schedule ==
All times are Azerbaijan Summer Time (UTC+5).

Date	Time	Round
26 June 2015	14:30	Qualifying time trial
26 June 2015	15:25	Time trial Superfinal
26 June 2015	17:00	Motos
28 June 2015	15:55	Final

== Results ==
=== Time trials ===
Rank	Name	Qualifying		Superfinal	
Rank	Name	Time	Rank	Time	Rank
1	Elke Vanhoof (BEL)	37.274	1	36.628	1
2	Simone Christensen (DEN)	37.634	3	37.212	2
3	Romana Labounková (CZE)	37.699	4	37.523	3
4	Aneta Hladíková (CZE)	37.352	2	37.572	4
5	Magalie Pottier (FRA)	37.711	5	37.720	5
6	Sandie Thibaut (FRA)	38.209	7	39.577	6
7	Sandra Aleksejeva (LAT)	38.219	8	40.910	7
8	Natalia Suvorova (RUS)	38.147	6	56.873	8
9	Merle van Benthem (NED)	38.301	9	Did not advance	
10	Nadja Pries (GER)	38.758	10	Did not advance	
11	Laura Smulders (NED)	38.962	11	Did not advance	
12	Vilma Rimšaitė (LTU)	40.497	12	Did not advance	
13	Ketlin Tekkel (EST)	49.300	13	Did not advance	
14	Eirini Mavraki (GRE)	52.169	14	Did not advance	
	Jone Vangoidsenhoven (BEL)	Did not start			

=== Motos ===
==== Heat 1 ====
Rank	Name	1st run	2nd run	3rd run	Total	Notes
1	Magalie Pottier (FRA)	37.464 (1)	37.421 (2)	37.759 (2)	5	Q
2	Merle van Benthem (NED)	37.593 (2)	37.390 (1)	38.672 (3)	6	Q
3	Elke Vanhoof (BEL)	37.698 (3)	37.820 (3)	36.949 (1)	7	Q
4	Aneta Hladíková (CZE)	38.507 (4)	37.976 (4)	38.797 (4)	12	Q
5	Natalia Suvorova (RUS)	41.174 (6)	38.946 (5)	39.777 (5)	16	
6	Vilma Rimšaitė (LTU)	40.041 (5)	40.947 (6)	41.378 (6)	17	
7	Ketlin Tekkel (EST)	47.921 (7)	47.330 (7)	47.832 (7)	21	

==== Heat 2 ====
Rank	Name	1st run	2nd run	3rd run	Total	Notes
1	Laura Smulders (NED)	38.336 (1)	38.151 (2)	38.326 (1)	4	Q
2	Simone Christensen (DEN)	38.758 (4)	38.058 (1)	38.508 (2)	7	Q
3	Romana Labounková (CZE)	38.513 (2)	38.602 (3)	40.647 (4)	9	Q
4	Sandra Aleksejeva (LAT)	38.726 (3)	39.044 (4)	51.229 (5)	12	Q
5	Sandie Thibaut (FRA)	39.406 (6)	41.157 (5)	38.615 (3)	14	
6	Eirini Mavraki (GRE)	1:07.142 (7)	57.467 (6)	56.492 (6)	19	
7	Nadja Pries (GER)	39.300 (5)	DNF (7)	DNS (9)	21	

=== Final ===
Rank	Name	Time
1st place, gold medalist(s)	Simone Christensen (DEN)	37.074
2nd place, silver medalist(s)	Magalie Pottier (FRA)	37.287
3rd place, bronze medalist(s)	Aneta Hladíková (CZE)	37.891
4	Merle van Benthem (NED)	38.370
5	Laura Smulders (NED)	43.176
6	Sandra Aleksejeva (LAT)	49.069
7	Elke Vanhoof (BEL)	51.360
8	Romana Labounková (CZE)	1:23.187
