= Badminton at the 2015 European Games – Women's singles =

Badminton's women's singles at the 2015 European Games
- Venue: Baku Sports Hall
- Dates: 22–28 June
- Competitors: 32 from 28 nations

Medalists
gold medal	Line Kjærsfeldt	Denmark
silver medal	Lianne Tan	Belgium
bronze medal	Clara Azurmendi	Spain
bronze medal	Petya Nedelcheva	Bulgaria

The badminton women's singles tournament at the 2015 European Games took place from 22 to 28 June.

== Competition format ==
The singles tournaments will be played with 32 participants, initially playing in eight groups of four, before the top two from each group qualify for a 16-player knock-out stage.

=== Schedule ===
All times are in AZST (UTC+05).

Start time	Session
22 June 9:00	Group stage, matchday 1
23 June 9:00	Group stage, matchday 2
24 June 9:00	Group stage, matchday 3
25 June 10:00	Round of 16
26 June 10:00	Quarter-finals
27 June 10:00	Semi-finals
28 June 13:00	Final

== Seeds ==
Seeds for all badminton events at the inaugural European Games were announced on 29 May.

1. Linda Zetchiri (BUL)
2. Line Kjærsfeldt (DEN)
3. Petya Nedelcheva (BUL)
4. Neslihan Yiğit (TUR)
5. Anna Thea Madsen (DEN)
6. Chloe Magee (IRL)
7. Jeanine Cicognini (ITA)
8. Natalia Perminova (RUS)

== Results ==
The group stage draws were held on 2 June.

=== Group stage ===
==== Group A ====
Pos	Team	Pld	W	L	GF	GA	GD	Qualification
1	Linda Zechiri (BUL) [1]	3	3	0	6	0	+6	Qualification to knock-out stage
2	Marija Ulitina (UKR)	3	2	1	4	2	+2	Qualification to knock-out stage
3	Laura Sárosi (HUN)	3	1	2	2	5	−3	
4	Weronika Grudzina (POL)	3	0	3	1	6	−5	

Source: Baku 2015

==== Group B ====
Pos	Team	Pld	W	L	GF	GA	GD	Qualification
1	Line Kjærsfeldt (DEN) [2]	3	3	0	6	0	+6	Qualification to knock-out stage
2	Clara Azurmendi (ESP)	3	2	1	4	2	+2	Qualification to knock-out stage
3	Sónia Gonçalves (POR)	3	1	2	2	4	−2	
4	Milica Simić (SRB)	3	0	3	0	6	−6	

Source: Baku 2015

==== Group C ====
Pos	Team	Pld	W	L	GF	GA	GD	Qualification
1	Petya Nedelcheva (BUL) [3]	3	3	0	6	0	+6	Qualification to knock-out stage
2	Delphine Lansac (FRA)	3	2	1	4	3	+1	Qualification to knock-out stage
3	Fabienne Deprez (GER)	3	1	2	3	4	−1	
4	Nicole Ankli (SUI) w/o	0	0	0	0	0	0	

Source: Baku 2015

==== Group D ====
Pos	Team	Pld	W	L	GF	GA	GD	Qualification
1	Neslihan Yiğit (TUR) [4]	3	3	0	6	1	+5	Qualification to knock-out stage
2	Ksenia Polikarpova (RUS)	3	2	1	5	2	+3	Qualification to knock-out stage
3	Dorotea Sutara (CRO)	3	1	2	2	4	−2	
4	Ioanna Karkantzia (GRE)	3	0	3	0	6	−6	

Source: Baku 2015

==== Group E ====
Pos	Team	Pld	W	L	GF	GA	GD	Qualification
1	Anna Thea Madsen (DEN) [5]	3	3	0	6	0	+6	Qualification to knock-out stage
2	Airi Mikkela (FIN)	3	2	1	4	2	+2	Qualification to knock-out stage
3	Sara Högnadóttir (ISL)	3	1	2	2	4	−2	
4	Fiorella Sadowski (MLT)	3	0	3	0	6	−6	

Source: Baku 2015

==== Group F ====
Pos	Team	Pld	W	L	GF	GA	GD	Qualification
1	Kati Tolmoff (EST)	3	2	1	5	2	+3	Qualification to knock-out stage
2	Lianne Tan (BEL)	3	2	1	5	3	+2	Qualification to knock-out stage
3	Chloe Magee (IRL) [6]	3	2	1	4	3	+1	
4	Kristīne Šefere (LAT)	3	0	3	0	6	−6	

Source: Baku 2015

==== Group G ====
Pos	Team	Pld	W	L	GF	GA	GD	Qualification
1	Jeanine Cicognini (ITA) [7]	3	3	0	6	0	+6	Qualification to knock-out stage
2	Kristína Gavnholt (CZE)	3	2	1	4	2	+2	Qualification to knock-out stage
3	Jana Čižnárová (SVK)	3	1	2	2	5	−3	
4	Kaja Stanković (SLO)	3	0	3	1	6	−5	

Source: Baku 2015

==== Group H ====
Pos	Team	Pld	W	L	GF	GA	GD	Qualification
1	Natalia Perminova (RUS) [8]	3	3	0	6	0	+6	Qualification to knock-out stage
2	Alesia Zaitsava (BLR)	3	2	1	4	2	+2	Qualification to knock-out stage
3	Akvilė Stapušaitytė (LTU)	3	1	2	2	4	−2	
4	Sonia Olariu (ROU) w/o	0	0	0	0	0	0	

Source: Baku 2015

=== Knock-out stage ===
Round of 16
1	L Zechiri (BUL)	21	21
A Mikkela (FIN)	19	10
8	N Perminova (RUS)	18	14
C Azurmendi (ESP)	21	21
4	N Yiğit (TUR)	21	10	11
D Lansac (FRA)	8	21	21
K Gavnholt (CZE)	16	18
L Tan (BEL)	21	21
K Polikarpova (RUS)	19	21	21
K Tolmoff (EST)	21	15	19
A Zaitsava (BLR)	13	21	12
3	P Nedelcheva (BUL)	21	13	21
M Ulitina (UKR)	11	19
5	A T Madsen (DEN)	21	21
7	J Cicognini (ITA)	10	23
2	L Kjærsfeldt (DEN)	21	25

Quarter-finals
1	L Zechiri (BUL)	21	17	17
C Azurmendi (ESP)	19	21	21
D Lansac (FRA)	21	16	15
L Tan (BEL)	16	21	21
K Polikarpova (RUS)	21	11	13
3	P Nedelcheva (BUL)	13	21	21
5	A T Madsen (DEN)	9	14
2	L Kjærsfeldt (DEN)	21	21

Semi-finals
C Azurmendi (ESP)	21	19	13
L Tan (BEL)	16	21	21
3	P Nedelcheva (BUL)	18	14
2	L Kjærsfeldt (DEN)	21	21

Final
L Tan (BEL)	21	19	9
2	L Kjærsfeldt (DEN)	18	21	21
