= Clara Azurmendi =

Spanish badminton player (born 1998)

Personal information
- Born: Clara Azurmendi Moreno; 4 May 1998 (age 28) San Sebastián, Spain
- Height: 1.83 m (6 ft 0 in)
- Weight: 68 kg (150 lb)

Sport
- Country: Spain
- Sport: Badminton
- Handedness: Right
- Coached by: Fernando Rivas; Anders Thomsen

Women's singles & doubles
- Highest ranking: WS: 34 (22 November 2022); WD: 38 with Beatriz Corrales (24 January 2023)
- Current ranking: WS: 83; WD: 335 with Lucía Rodríguez (9 June 2026)
- BWF profile
Medal record
Women's badminton
Representing Spain
European Games
Bronze medal – third place	2015 Baku	Women's singles
European Women's Team Championships
Silver medal – second place	2024 Łódź	Women's team
Bronze medal – third place	2016 Kazan	Women's team
Bronze medal – third place	2018 Kazan	Women's team
European Junior Championships
Gold medal – first place	2015 Lubin	Mixed team

Clara Azurmendi Moreno (Note: In this Spanish name, the first or paternal surname is Azurmendi and the second or maternal family name is Moreno.) (born 4 May 1998) is a Spanish badminton player. She won the bronze medal at the Baku 2015 European Games in the women's singles event. She won her first international title at the 2016 Bulgarian International tournament. Azurmendi competed at the 2020 Tokyo Olympics.

== Achievements ==
=== European Games ===
Women's singles
Year	Venue	Opponent	Score	Result
2015	Baku Sports Hall; Baku, Azerbaijan	(Belgium) Lianne Tan	21–16, 19–21, 13–21	Bronze

=== BWF International Challenge/Series (7 titles, 7 runners-up) ===
Women's singles
Year	Tournament	Opponent	Score	Result
2016	Bulgarian International	(Denmark) Julie Dawal Jakobsen	26–24, 21–11	(gold) Winner
2016	Italian International	(Switzerland) Sabrina Jaquet	20–22, 14–21	(silver) Runner-up
2016	Turkey International	(Turkey) Cemre Fere	21–14, 16–21, 12–21	(silver) Runner-up
2017	Romanian International	(Denmark) Anne Hald Jensen	Walkover	(gold) Winner
2018	Welsh International	(Netherlands) Gayle Mahulette	12–21, 21–6, 21–12	(gold) Winner
2019	Dutch International	(Denmark) Line Christophersen	19–21, 14–21	(silver) Runner-up
2019	Slovenian International	(Denmark) Sofie Holmboe Dahl	14–21, 21–17, 21–18	(gold) Winner
2019	Welsh International	(Germany) Fabienne Deprez	21–14, 21–16	(gold) Winner
2021	Austrian Open	(France) Yaëlle Hoyaux	21–6, 21–14	(gold) Winner
2021	Mexican International	(Spain) Beatriz Corrales	18–21, 17–21	(silver) Runner-up
2022	Peru Challenge	(Japan) Kaoru Sugiyama	13–15 retired	(silver) Runner-up
2024	Mexican International	(United States) Ishika Jaiswal	21–14, 19–21, 19–21	(silver) Runner-up

Women's doubles
Year	Tournament	Partner	Opponent	Score	Result
2021	Mexican International	(Spain) Beatriz Corrales	(Spain) Lucía Rodríguez (Spain) Ania Setién	23–21, 12–21, 22–20	(gold) Winner
2022	Canadian International	(Spain) Beatriz Corrales	(United States) Annie Xu (United States) Kerry Xu	21–15, 15–21, 14–21	(silver) Runner-up

BWF International Challenge tournament
BWF International Series tournament
BWF Future Series tournament
