= Gymnastics at the 2015 European Games =

- Venue: National Gymnastics Arena
- Dates: 15–21 June 2015
- Competitors: 425 from 37 nations

Gymnastics competitions at the 2015 European Games were held in the National Gymnastics Arena, Baku between 15–21 June 2015.

In all, five different gymnastics disciplines were contested. In addition to the existing Olympic programme, additional events were held in both the rhythmic gymnastics and trampolining disciplines. In addition, events in two non-Olympic disciplines, aerobic gymnastics and acrobatic gymnastics were included.

== Qualification ==
A total of 425 athletes qualified for the gymnastics competitions. Qualification was based on the results from the World or European Championships in each discipline.

== Medal summary ==
=== Acrobatic ===
==== Women's groups ====
Event	Gold	Silver	Bronze
All-around	Belgium; Kaat Dumarey; Julie Van Gelder; Ineke Van Schoor	Russia; Valeriia Belkina; Yulia Nikitina; Zhanna Parkhometc	Belarus; Katsiaryna Barysevich; Veranika Nabokina; Karina Sandovich
Balance	Belgium; Kaat Dumarey; Julie Van Gelder; Ineke Van Schoor	Russia; Valeriia Belkina; Yulia Nikitina; Zhanna Parkhometc	Belarus; Katsiaryna Barysevich; Veranika Nabokina; Karina Sandovich
Dynamic	Belgium; Kaat Dumarey; Julie Van Gelder; Ineke Van Schoor	Russia; Valeriia Belkina; Yulia Nikitina; Zhanna Parkhometc	Belarus; Katsiaryna Barysevich; Veranika Nabokina; Karina Sandovich

==== Mixed pairs ====
Event	Gold	Silver	Bronze
All-around	Russia; Marina Chernova; Georgy Pataraya	Belgium; Yana Vastavel; Solano Cassamajor	Great Britain; Hannah Baughn; Ryan Bartlett
Balance	Russia; Marina Chernova; Georgy Pataraya	Belgium; Yana Vastavel; Solano Cassamajor	Great Britain; Hannah Baughn; Ryan Bartlett
Dynamic	Russia; Marina Chernova; Georgy Pataraya	Belgium; Yana Vastavel; Solano Cassamajor	Great Britain; Hannah Baughn; Ryan Bartlett

=== Aerobic ===
Event	Gold	Silver	Bronze
Mixed pairs	Spain; Sara Moreno; Vicente Lli	Italy; Michela Castoldi; Davide Donati	Russia; Dukhik Dzhanazian; Denis Soloev
Mixed groups	Hungary; Panna Szöllősi; Dóra Lendvay; Dóra Hegyi; Balázs Farkas; Dániel Bali	Romania; Lavinia Panaete; Bianca Gorgovan; Dacian Barna; Daniel Bocser; Lucian Săvulescu	Spain; Belén Guillemot; Aránzazu Martínez; Sara Moreno; Vicente Lli; Pedro Moreno

=== Artistic gymnastics ===
==== Men's events ====
Event	Gold	Silver	Bronze
Team all-around	Russia; David Belyavskiy; Nikita Ignatyev; Nikolai Kuksenkov	Ukraine; Igor Radivilov; Oleg Verniaiev; Mykyta Yermak	Azerbaijan; Petro Pakhnyuk; Oleg Stepko; Eldar Safarov
Individual all-around	Oleg Verniaiev; Ukraine	Oleg Stepko; Azerbaijan	Nikita Ignatyev; Russia
Floor exercise	Rayderley Zapata; Spain	Fabian Hambüchen; Germany	David Belyavskiy; Russia
Pommel horse	Sašo Bertoncelj; Slovenia	Oleg Stepko; Azerbaijan	Brinn Bevan; Great Britain
Rings	Eleftherios Petrounias; Greece	Nikita Ignatyev; Russia	İbrahim Çolak; Turkey
Vault	Oleg Verniaiev; Ukraine	Casimir Schmidt; Netherlands	Oleg Stepko; Azerbaijan
Parallel bars	Oleg Stepko; Azerbaijan	David Belyavskiy; Russia	Marius Berbecar; Romania
Horizontal bar	Fabian Hambüchen; Germany	Vlasios Maras; Greece	Nikita Ignatyev; Russia

==== Women's events ====
Event	Gold	Silver	Bronze
Team all-around	Russia; Aliya Mustafina; Viktoria Komova; Seda Tutkhalyan	Germany; Elisabeth Seitz; Sophie Scheder; Leah Grießer	Netherlands; Céline van Gerner; Lieke Wevers; Lisa Top
Individual all-around	Aliya Mustafina; Russia	Giulia Steingruber; Switzerland	Lieke Wevers; Netherlands
Vault	Giulia Steingruber; Switzerland	Seda Tutkhalyan; Russia	Lisa Top; Netherlands
Uneven bars	Aliya Mustafina; Russia	Sophie Scheder; Germany	Andreea Iridon; Romania
Balance beam	Lieke Wevers; Netherlands	Andreea Iridon; Romania	Giulia Steingruber; Switzerland
Floor exercise	Giulia Steingruber; Switzerland	Aliya Mustafina; Russia	Lieke Wevers; Netherlands

=== Rhythmic gymnastics ===
==== Individual ====
Event	Gold	Silver	Bronze
All-around	Yana Kudryavtseva; Russia	Margarita Mamun; Russia	Melitina Staniouta; Belarus
Ball	Yana Kudryavtseva; Russia	Ganna Rizatdinova; Ukraine	Melitina Staniouta; Belarus
Clubs	Yana Kudryavtseva; Russia	Ganna Rizatdinova; Ukraine	Melitina Staniouta; Belarus
Hoop	Margarita Mamun; Russia	Melitina Staniouta; Belarus	Neta Rivkin; Israel
Ribbon	Yana Kudryavtseva; Russia	Marina Durunda; Azerbaijan	Salome Pazhava; Georgia

==== Group ====
Event	Gold	Silver	Bronze
All-around	Russia; Diana Borisova; Daria Kleshcheva; Anastasia Maksimova; Anastasiia Tatareva; Maria Tolkacheva; Sofya Skomorokh	Israel; Yuval Filo; Alona Koshevatskiy; Ekaterina Levina; Karina Lykhvar; Ida Mayrin	Belarus; Ksenya Cheldishkina; Maria Kadobina; Aliaksandra Narkevich; Valeriya Pischelina; Arina Tsitsilina; Hanna Dudzenkova
5 Ribbons	Russia; Diana Borisova; Anastasia Maksimova; Anastasiia Tatareva; Maria Tolkacheva; Sofya Skomorokh	Ukraine; Olena Dmytrash; Yevgeniya Gomon; Oleksandra Gridasova; Valeriia Gudym; Anastasiya Voznyak	Israel; Yuval Filo; Alona Koshevatskiy; Ekaterina Levina; Karina Lykhvar; Ida Mayrin
6 Clubs and 2 Hoops	Belarus; Ksenya Cheldishkina; Maria Kadobina; Valeriya Pischelina; Arina Tsitsilina; Hanna Dudzenkova	Israel; Yuval Filo; Alona Koshevatskiy; Ekaterina Levina; Karina Lykhvar; Ida Mayrin	Ukraine; Olena Dmytrash; Yevgeniya Gomon; Oleksandra Gridasova; Valeriia Gudym; Anastasiya Voznyak

=== Trampoline ===
Event	Gold	Silver	Bronze
Men's individual	Dmitry Ushakov; Russia	Uladzislau Hancharou; Belarus	Ilya Grishunin; Azerbaijan
Men's synchronized	Russia; Dmitry Ushakov; Mikhail Melnik	Belarus; Uladzislau Hancharou; Mikalai Kazak	Germany; Martin Gromowski; Kyrylo Sonn
Women's individual	Yana Pavlova; Russia	Katherine Driscoll; Great Britain	Hanna Harchonak; Belarus
Women's synchronized	Russia; Yana Pavlova; Anna Kornetskaya	France; Marine Jurbert; Joëlle Vallez	Portugal; Beatriz Martins; Ana Rente

== Medal table ==
* Host nation (Azerbaijan)

Rank	Nation	Gold	Silver	Bronze	Total
1	Russia	18	8	4	30
2	Belgium	3	3	0	6
3	Ukraine	2	4	1	7
4	Switzerland	2	1	1	4
5	Spain	2	0	1	3
6	Belarus	1	3	8	12
7	Azerbaijan*	1	3	3	7
8	Germany	1	3	1	5
9	Netherlands	1	1	4	6
10	Greece	1	1	0	2
11	Hungary	1	0	0	1
11	Slovenia	1	0	0	1
13	Israel	0	2	2	4
13	Romania	0	2	2	4
15	Great Britain	0	1	4	5
16	France	0	1	0	1
16	Italy	0	1	0	1
18	Georgia	0	0	1	1
18	Portugal	0	0	1	1
18	Turkey	0	0	1	1
Totals (20 entries)		34	34	34	102
