= Solano Cassamajor =

Belgian acrobatic gymnast (born 1995)

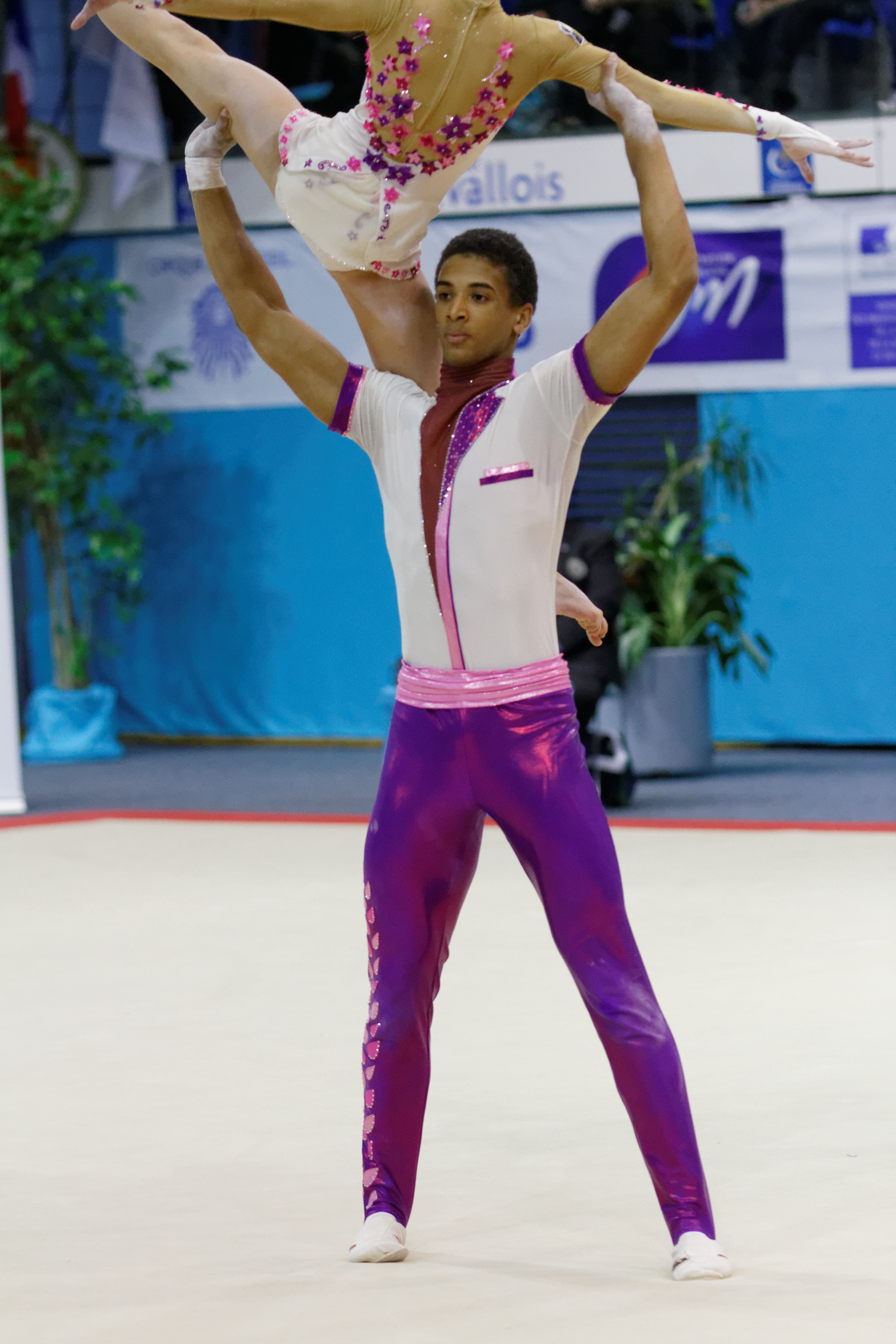
- Solano Cassamajor and his partner Yana Vastavel at the 2014 Acrobatic Gymnastics World Championships

Personal information
- Born: 21 November 1995 (age 30)

Gymnastics career
- Discipline: Acrobatic gymnastics
- Country represented: Belgium
- Club: Ambitious Pro Gymnastics, Topsportcentrum Gent
- Head coaches: Sergey Tretyakov, Stanislav Kosakovsky, Irina Shadrina
Medal record
Acrobatic gymnastics
Representing Belgium
European Games
| Silver medal – second place | 2015 Baku | Mixed pair all-around |
| Silver medal – second place | 2015 Baku | Mixed pair balance |
| Silver medal – second place | 2015 Baku | Mixed pair dynamic |

Solano Cassamajor (born 21 November 1995) is a Belgian male acrobatic gymnast. Along with his partner, Yana Vastavel, he finished 4th in the 2014 Acrobatic Gymnastics World Championships.
