= Ineke Van Schoor =

Belgian acrobatic gymnast

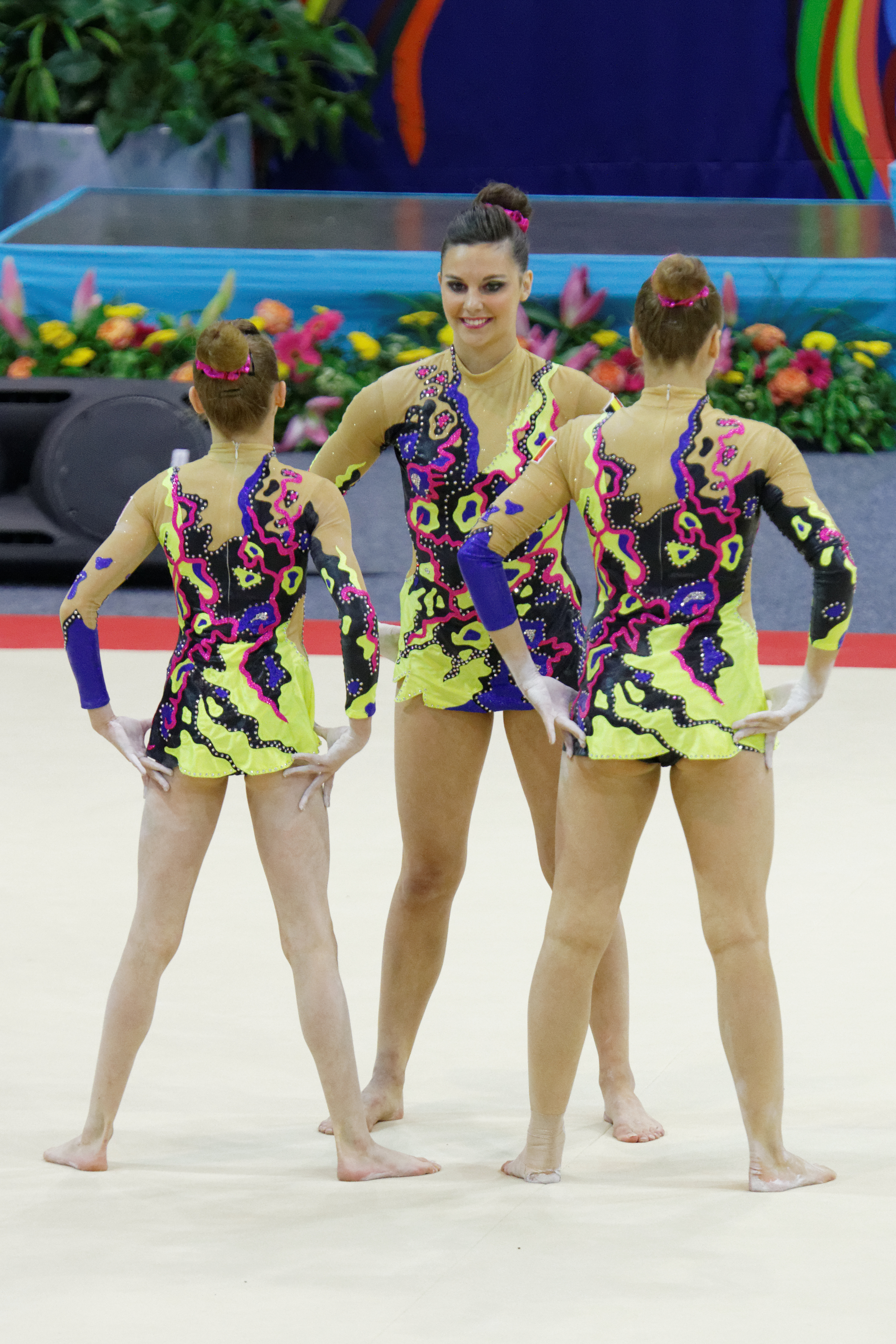
- (L.t.r.) Kaat Dumarey, Ineke Van Schoor and Julie Van Gelder at the 2014 Acrobatic Gymnastics World Championships

Personal information
- Full name: Ineke Van Schoor
- Born: 6 November 1995 (age 30)

Gymnastics career
- Discipline: Acrobatic gymnastics
- Country represented: Belgium
- Club: Topsportcentrum Gent, Ambitious Pro Gymnastics
- Head coaches: Slavik Kosakovsky, Sergey Tretjakov
- Choreographer: Irina Sadrina
Medal record
Women's acrobatic gymnastics
Representing Belgium
World Championships
Bronze medal – third place	2014 Levallois-Perret	Group All-Around
European Games
Gold medal – first place	2015 Baku	Group All-Around
Gold medal – first place	2015 Baku	Group Balance
Gold medal – first place	2015 Baku	Group Dynamic

Ineke Van Schoor (born 6 November 1995) is a Belgian female acrobatic gymnast. With partners Julie Van Gelder and Kaat Dumarey, Van Schoor achieved bronze in the 2014 Acrobatic Gymnastics World Championships.

In June 2015, she participated in the 2015 European Games along with partners Julie van Gelder and Kaat Dumarey. They won the gold medal in the all-around event, with a score of 86.480. In addition, they posted the highest score on their balance and dynamic routines, with a 28.700 and a 28.450, respectively.
