= Kaat Dumarey =

Belgian acrobatic gymnast

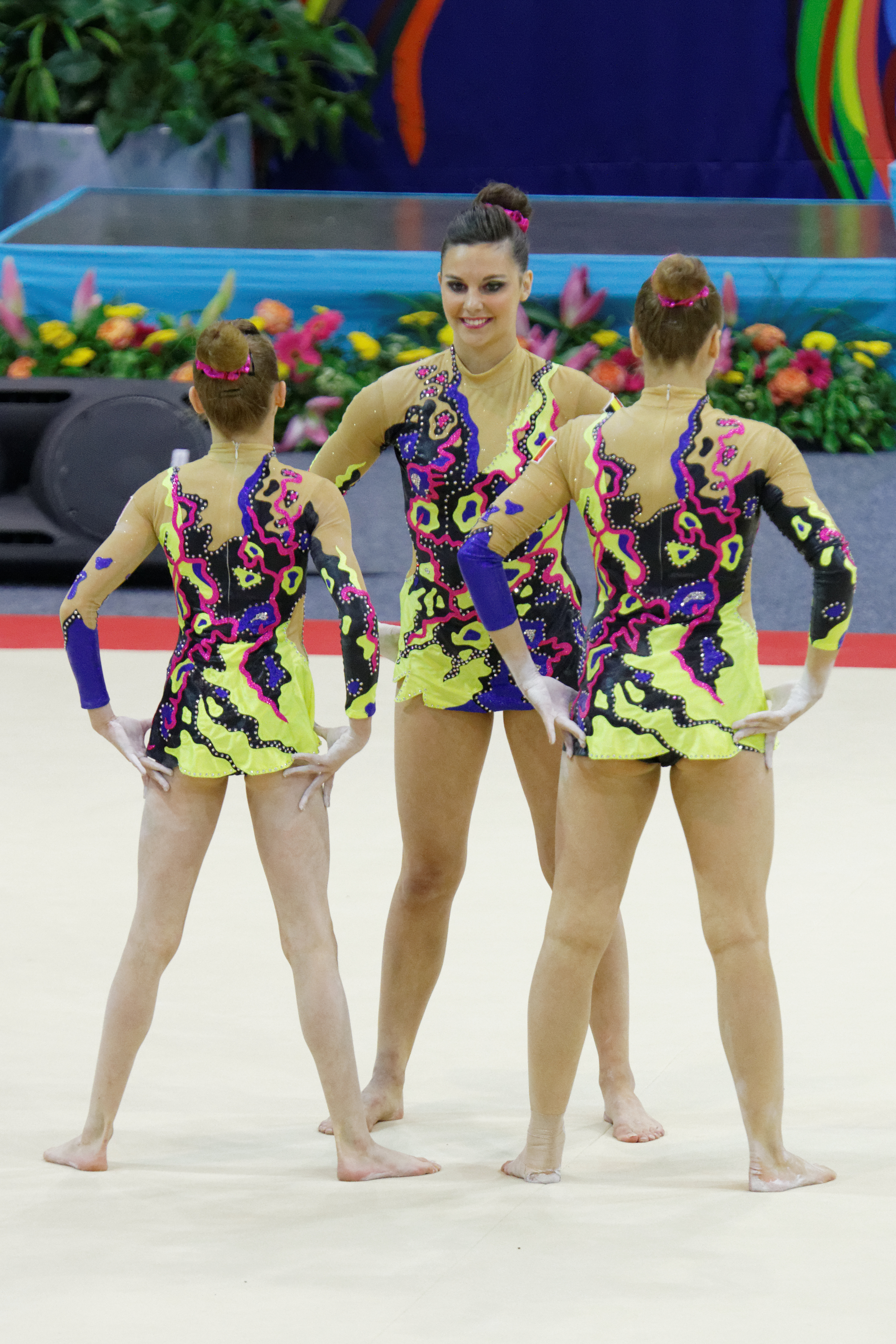
- Kaat Dumarey (left), Ineke Van Schoor and Julie Van Gelder at the 2014 Acrobatic Gymnastics World Championships

Personal information
- Born: 8 September 1999 (age 26) Roeselare, Belgium

Gymnastics career
- Discipline: Acrobatic gymnastics
- Country represented: Belgium
- Club: WIK Oostende, Topsportcentrum Gent
- Head coaches: Slavik Kosakovsky, Sergey Tretjakov
- Choreographer: Irina Sadrina
Medal record
Women's acrobatic gymnastics
Representing Belgium
World Championships
Bronze medal – third place	2014 Levallois-Perret	Group All-Around
European Games
Gold medal – first place	2015 Baku	Group All-Around
Gold medal – first place	2015 Baku	Group Balance
Gold medal – first place	2015 Baku	Group Dynamic

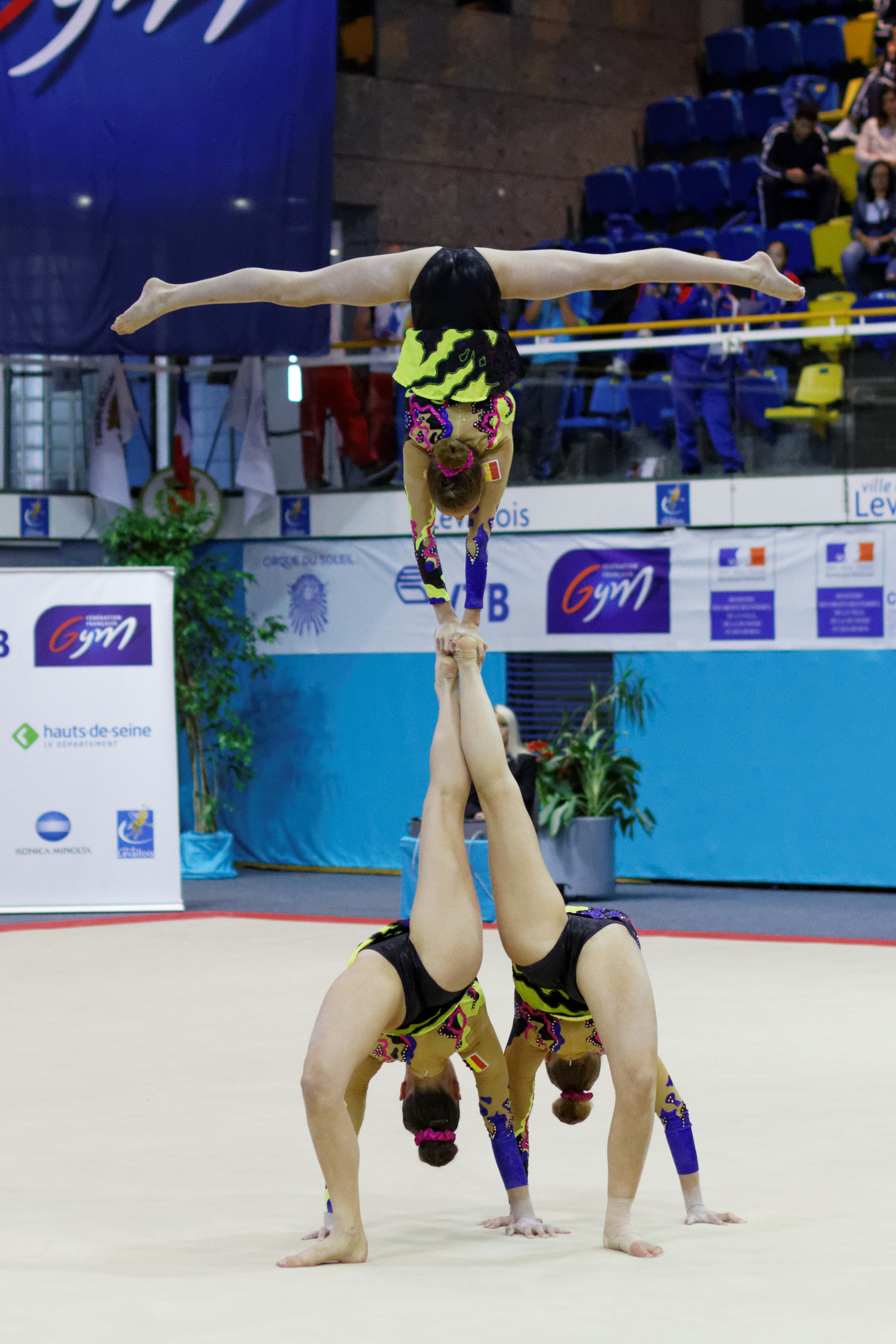
Kaat Dumarey (top), Ineke Van Schoor and Julie Van Gelder at the 2014 Acrobatic Gymnastics World Championships.

Kaat Dumarey (born 8 September 1999) is a Belgian female acrobatic gymnast. With partners Ineke Van Schoor and Julie Van Gelder, Dumarey achieved bronze in the 2014 Acrobatic Gymnastics World Championships.

In June 2015 she participated at the 2015 European Games along with partners Julie van Gelder and Ineke van Schoor. They won the gold medal in the all-around event, with a score of 86.480. They also posted the highest score on their balance and dynamic routines, with a 28.700 and a 28.450, respectively.
