= Julie Van Gelder =

Belgian acrobatic gymnast

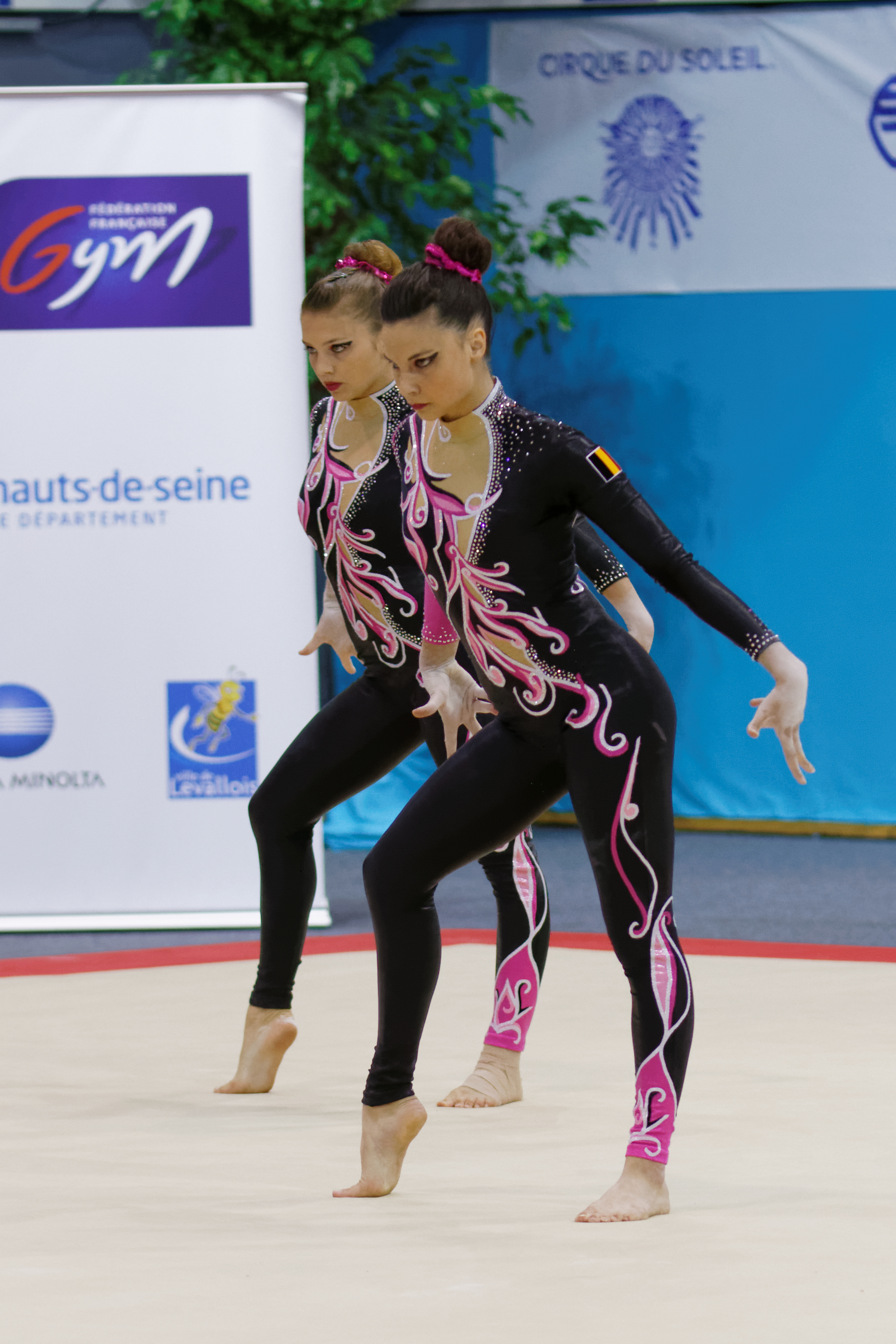
- Full name: Julie Van Gelder
- Born: 17 September 1993 (age 32)

Gymnastics career
- Discipline: Acrobatic gymnastics
- Country represented: Belgium (Yes)
- Club: Topsportcentrum Ghent
- Head coaches: Slavik Kosakovsky, Sergey Tretjakov
- Choreographer: Irina Sadrina
Medal record
Women's acrobatic gymnastics
Representing Belgium
World Championships
Bronze medal – third place	2014 Levallois-Perret	Group
European Games
Gold medal – first place	2015 Baku	Group All-Around
Gold medal – first place	2015 Baku	Group Balance
Gold medal – first place	2015 Baku	Group Dynamic

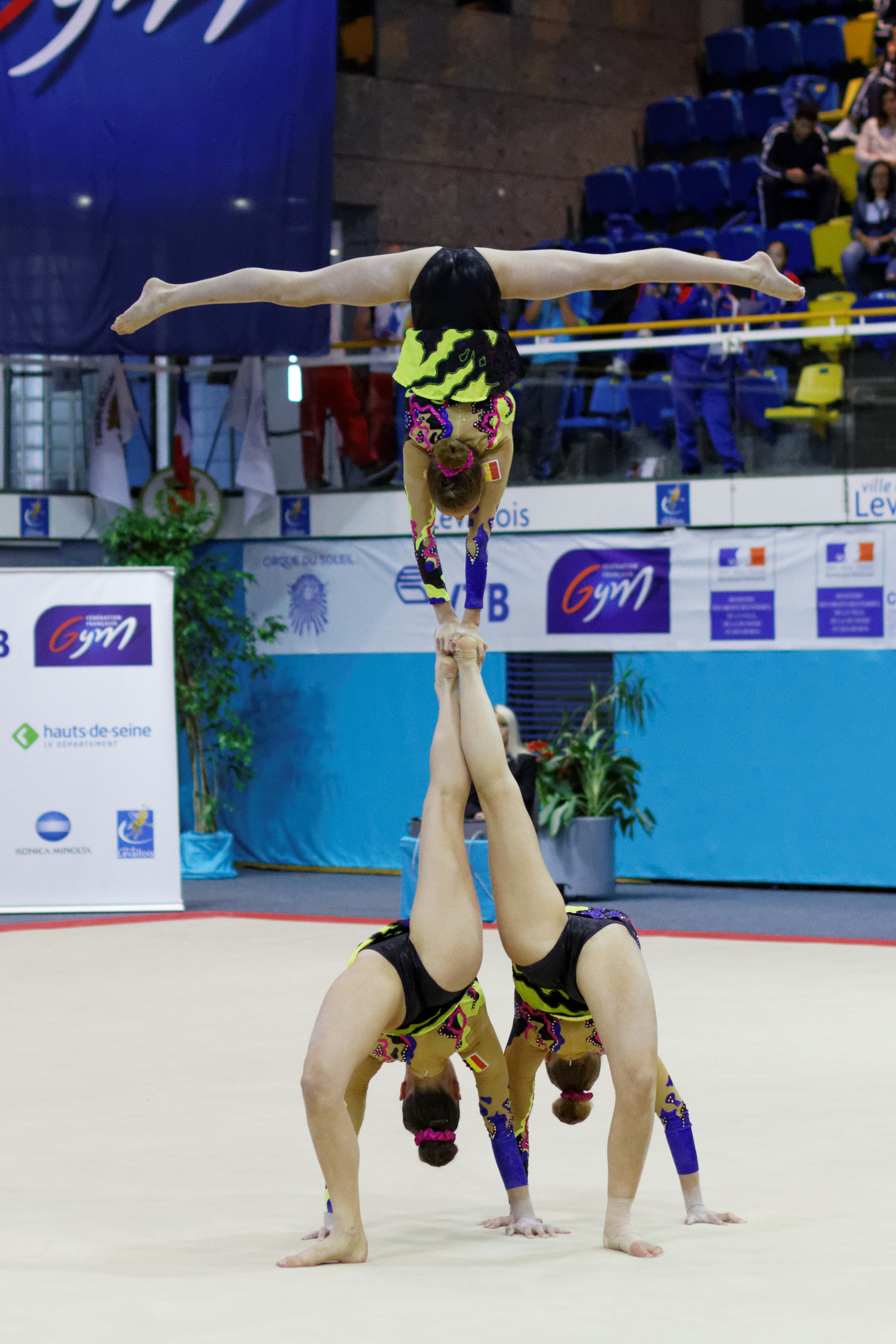
Julie Van Gelder, Kaat Dumarey and Ineke Van Schoor at the 2014 Acrobatic Gymnastics World Championships.

Julie Van Gelder (born 17 September 1993) is a Belgian female acrobatic gymnast. With partners Ineke Van Schoor and Kaat Dumarey, Van Gelder achieved bronze in the 2014 Acrobatic Gymnastics World Championships.

In June 2015, she participated in the first European Games along with partners Ineke van Schoor and Kaat Dumarey, and won the gold medal in the all-around event, with a score of 86.480. They also posted the highest score on their balance and dynamic routines, with a 28.700 and a 28.450, respectively.
