= Yana Vastavel =

Belgian acrobatic gymnast

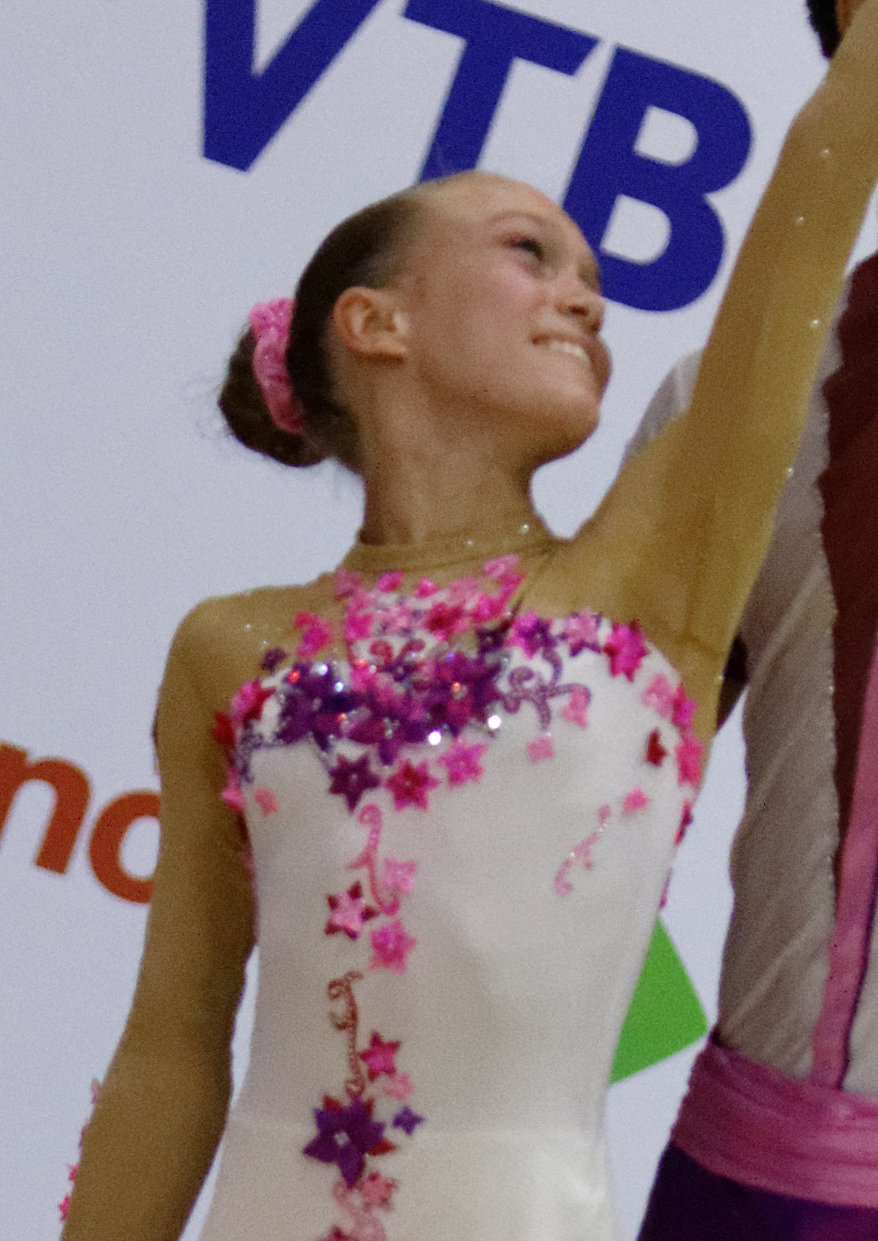
- Yana Vastavel, at the 2014 Acrobatic Gymnastics World Championships

Personal information
- Born: 22 October 1999 (age 26) Mechelen, Belgium

Gymnastics career
- Discipline: Acrobatic gymnastics
- Country represented: Belgium
- Club: Ambitious Pro Gymnastics, Topsportcentrum Gent
- Head coaches: Sergey Tretyakov, Stanislav Kosakovsky, Irina Shadrina
Medal record
Acrobatic gymnastics
Representing Belgium
European Games
Silver medal – second place	2015 Baku	Mixed pair all-around
Silver medal – second place	2015 Baku	Mixed pair balance
Silver medal – second place	2015 Baku	Mixed pair dynamic

Yana Vastavel (born 22 October 1999) is a Belgian female acrobatic gymnast. Along with her partner, Solano Cassamajor, she finished 4th in the 2014 Acrobatic Gymnastics World Championships.
