= Lianne Tan =

Belgian badminton player (born 1990)

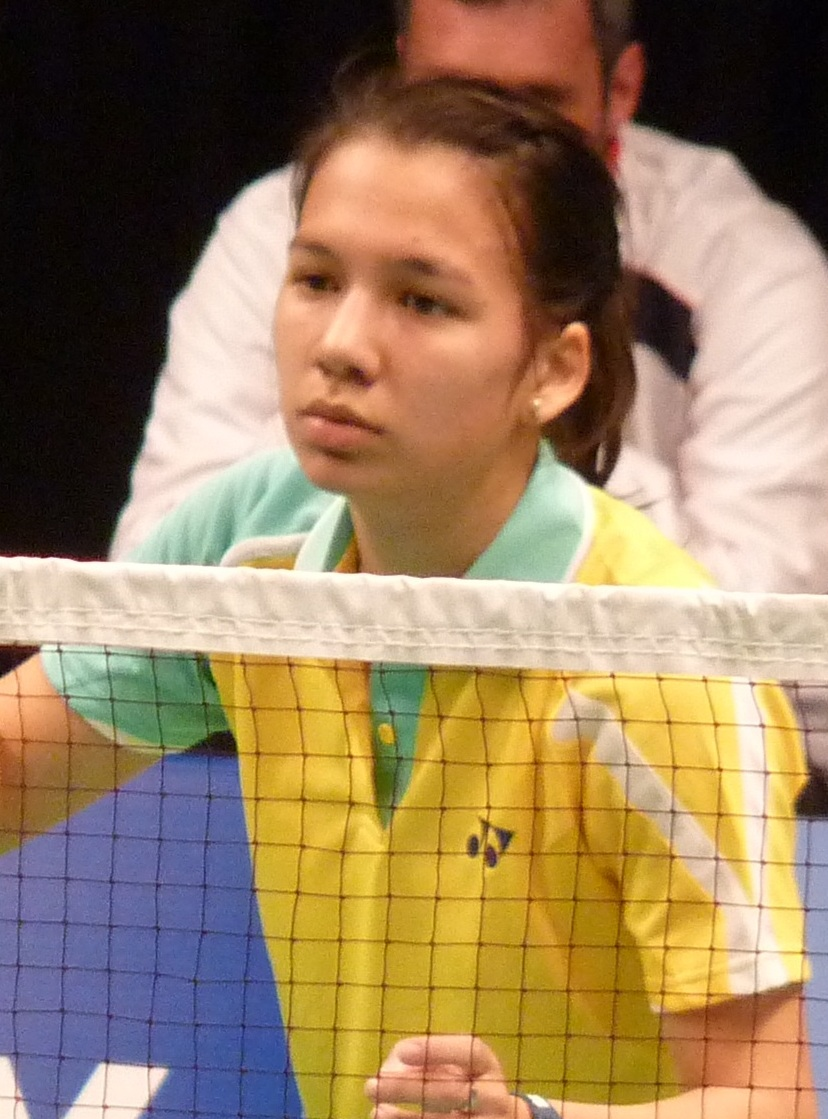
- Tan in 2013

Personal information
- Born: 20 November 1990 (age 35) Bilzen, Belgium
- Height: 1.63 m (5 ft 4 in)
- Weight: 54 kg (119 lb)

Sport
- Country: Belgium
- Sport: Badminton
- Handedness: Right

Women's singles
- Career record: 250 wins, 238 losses
- Highest ranking: 34 (27 September 2022)
- BWF profile
Medal record
Women's badminton
Representing Belgium
European Games
Silver medal – second place	2015 Baku	Women's singles
European Junior Championships
Bronze medal – third place	2009 Milan	Girls' singles

Lianne Tan (born 20 November 1990) is a Belgian badminton player. She competed for Belgium at the 2012 London, 2016 Rio, 2020 Tokyo, and 2024 Paris Olympics. She was selected to participate in the 2012 Summer Olympics, together with her brother Yuhan. In 2015, she won the silver medal in the European Games in Baku, Azerbaijan.

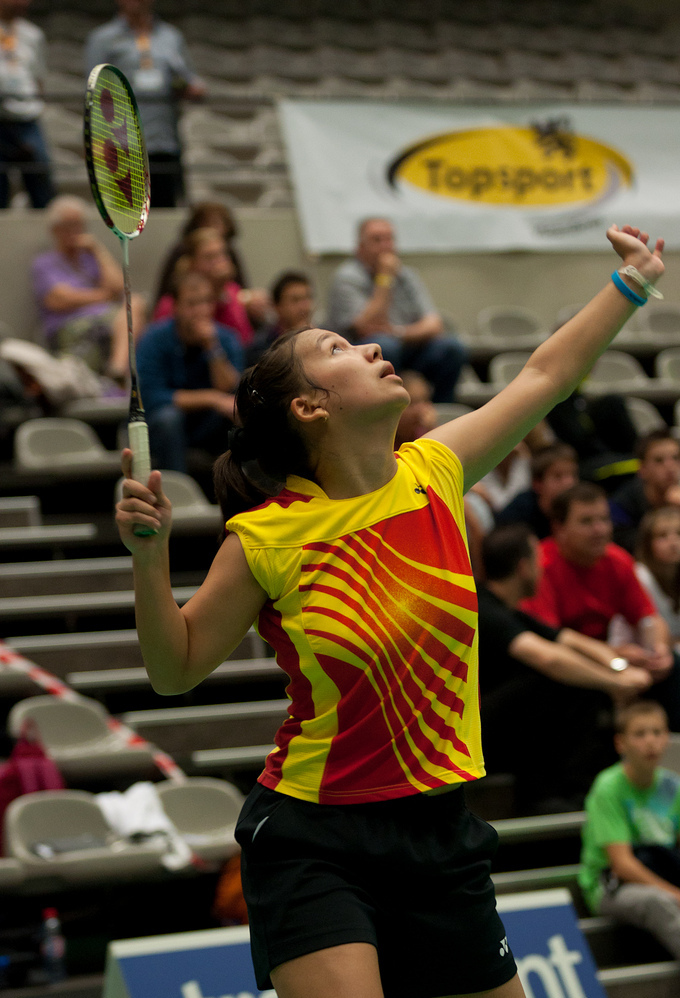
Lianne Tan in 2011

== Personal life ==
Tan's father, Hank Tan, is Indonesian Chinese, while her mother, Maria Meyers, is Belgian (Flemish), and a native of Bilzen. Her parents met when her father came to Belgium to study dentistry.

== Achievements ==
=== European Games ===
Women's singles
Year	Venue	Opponent	Score	Result
2015	Baku Sports Hall; Baku, Azerbaijan	(Denmark) Line Kjærsfeldt	21–18, 19–21, 9–21	Silver

=== European Junior Championships ===
Girls' singles
Year	Venue	Opponent	Score	Result
2009	Federal Technical Centre - Palabadminton; Milan, Italy	(Spain) Carolina Marín	21–18, 13–21, 8–21	Bronze

=== BWF International Challenge/Series (9 titles, 7 runners-up) ===
Women's singles
Year	Tournament	Opponent	Score	Result
2008	Slovenian International	(Bulgaria) Linda Zetchiri	15–21, 15–21	(silver) Runner-up
2009	Slovenian International	(Slovenia) Maja Tvrdy	10–21, 16–21	(silver) Runner-up
2009	Spanish Open	(India) Sayali Gokhale	9–21, 18–21	(silver) Runner-up
2010	Slovenian International	(Slovenia) Maja Tvrdy	21–16, 21–16	(gold) Winner
2011	Cyprus International	(Russia) Tatjana Bibik	13–21, 21–18, 18–11 retired	(gold) Winner
2014	Morocco International	(Mauritius) Kate Foo Kune	7–11, 11–9, 11–9, 11–8	(gold) Winner
2015	Romanian International	(England) Chloe Birch	11–7, 11–7, 12–10	(gold) Winner
2015	Dutch International	(Netherlands) Soraya de Visch Eijbergen	21–17, 21–18	(gold) Winner
2015	Kazakhstan International	(Russia) Evgeniya Kosetskaya	17–21, 10–21	(silver) Runner-up
2015	Morocco International	(Finland) Nanna Vainio	15–21, 24–22, 21–8	(gold) Winner
2016	Estonian International	(Ukraine) Marija Ulitina	21–19, 21–14	(gold) Winner
2016	Tahiti International	(Japan) Moe Araki	17–21, 12–21	(silver) Runner-up
2018	Suriname International	(Peru) Daniela Macías	21–10, 21–6	(gold) Winner
2019	Brazil International	(Bulgaria) Linda Zetchiri	17–21, 21–12, 13–4 retired	(gold) Winner
2019	Azerbaijan International	(Thailand) Phittayaporn Chaiwan	15–21, 16–21	(silver) Runner-up
2022	Welsh International	(Germany) Yvonne Li	17–21, 12–21	(silver) Runner-up

BWF International Challenge tournament
BWF International Series tournament
BWF Future Series tournament
