= 2016 FIVB Volleyball Men's Club World Championship squads =

This article shows all participating team squads at the 2016 FIVB Volleyball Men's Club World Championship, held from 18 to 23 October 2016 in Betim, Brazil.

== Pool A ==
=== Sada Cruzeiro ===
The following is the roster of the Brazilian club Sada Cruzeiro in the 2016 FIVB Volleyball Men's Club World Championship.

Head coach: (Argentina) Marcelo Mendez

| No. | Name | Date of birth | Height | Weight | Spike | Block |
|---|---|---|---|---|---|---|
| -1 | (Brazil) Felipi Johann Ramme | 23 May 1997 | 1.99 m (6 ft 6 in) | 80 kg (180 lb) | 335 cm (132 in) | 315 cm (124 in) |
| 1 | (Brazil) Alan Souza | 21 March 1994 | 2.02 m (6 ft 8 in) | 98 kg (216 lb) | 336 cm (132 in) | 320 cm (130 in) |
| 2 | (Brazil) Cristiano Torelli Mello Tavares | 19 October 1996 | 1.92 m (6 ft 4 in) | 80 kg (180 lb) | 320 cm (130 in) | 300 cm (120 in) |
| 3 | (Brazil) Éder Levy Kock | 7 April 1993 | 2.07 m (6 ft 9 in) | 99 kg (218 lb) | 335 cm (132 in) | 315 cm (124 in) |
| 4 | (Brazil) Leonardo Ferreira Do Nascimento | 16 March 1995 | 1.99 m (6 ft 6 in) | 87 kg (192 lb) | 338 cm (133 in) | 316 cm (124 in) |
| 5 | (Brazil) Vanderson Malta | 30 April 1995 | 1.76 m (5 ft 9 in) | 80 kg (180 lb) | 306 cm (120 in) | 257 cm (101 in) |
| 6 | (Brazil) Robert Araujo | 10 March 1996 | 2.03 m (6 ft 8 in) | 97 kg (214 lb) | 359 cm (141 in) | 325 cm (128 in) |
| 7 | (Brazil) William Arjona (C) | 31 July 1979 | 1.86 m (6 ft 1 in) | 78 kg (172 lb) | 300 cm (120 in) | 295 cm (116 in) |
| 8 | (Brazil) Evandro Guerra | 27 December 1981 | 2.07 m (6 ft 9 in) | 106 kg (234 lb) | 359 cm (141 in) | 332 cm (131 in) |
| 9 | (Brazil) Yoandry Leal | 31 August 1988 | 2.02 m (6 ft 8 in) | 107 kg (236 lb) | 361 cm (142 in) | 348 cm (137 in) |
| 10 | (Cuba) Robertlandy Simón | 11 June 1987 | 2.08 m (6 ft 10 in) | 114 kg (251 lb) | 358 cm (141 in) | 326 cm (128 in) |
| 11 | (Brazil) Rodrigo Leão | 5 June 1996 | 1.97 m (6 ft 6 in) | 85 kg (187 lb) | 331 cm (130 in) | 316 cm (124 in) |
| 12 | (Brazil) Isac Santos | 13 December 1990 | 2.08 m (6 ft 10 in) | 99 kg (218 lb) | 339 cm (133 in) | 306 cm (120 in) |
| 14 | (Brazil) Fernando Kreling | 13 January 1996 | 1.85 m (6 ft 1 in) | 85 kg (187 lb) | 319 cm (126 in) | 301 cm (119 in) |
| 16 | (Brazil) Pedro Luiz Da Silva Santos | 25 February 1994 | 2.04 m (6 ft 8 in) | 99 kg (218 lb) | 345 cm (136 in) | 326 cm (128 in) |
| 17 | (Brazil) Sérgio Nogueira | 25 August 1978 | 1.84 m (6 ft 0 in) | 79 kg (174 lb) | 322 cm (127 in) | 319 cm (126 in) |
| 18 | (Brazil) Filipe Ferraz | 1 March 1980 | 1.94 m (6 ft 4 in) | 90 kg (200 lb) | 335 cm (132 in) | 305 cm (120 in) |
| 19 | (Brazil) Renan Zanatta Buiatti | 10 January 1990 | 2.17 m (7 ft 1 in) | 95 kg (209 lb) | 330 cm (130 in) | 314 cm (124 in) |
| 20 | (Brazil) Pablo Natan Ventura | 29 April 1998 | 1.94 m (6 ft 4 in) | 92 kg (203 lb) | 336 cm (132 in) | 315 cm (124 in) |

=== Taichung Bank ===
The following is the roster of the Taiwanese club Taichung Bank in the 2016 FIVB Volleyball Men's Club World Championship.

Head coach: (Chinese Taipei) Ke-Chou Cheng

| No. | Name | Date of birth | Height | Weight | Spike | Block |
|---|---|---|---|---|---|---|
| 2 | (Chinese Taipei) Hong-Jie Liu | 10 November 1993 | 1.89 m (6 ft 2 in) | 80 kg (180 lb) | 327 cm (129 in) | 320 cm (130 in) |
| 4 | (Chinese Taipei) Ju-Chien Tai | 14 November 1988 | 1.81 m (5 ft 11 in) | 77 kg (170 lb) | 320 cm (130 in) | 310 cm (120 in) |
| 5 | (Chinese Taipei) Li-Yi Tung | 10 October 1994 | 1.65 m (5 ft 5 in) | 62 kg (137 lb) | 280 cm (110 in) | 270 cm (110 in) |
| 7 | (Chinese Taipei) Hung-Min Liu | 10 November 1993 | 1.91 m (6 ft 3 in) | 85 kg (187 lb) | 325 cm (128 in) | 315 cm (124 in) |
| 8 | (Chinese Taipei) Liang-Hao Chang | 7 July 1994 | 1.94 m (6 ft 4 in) | 86 kg (190 lb) | 320 cm (130 in) | 310 cm (120 in) |
| 9 | (Chinese Taipei) Tien-Yu Chiang | 7 February 1988 | 1.96 m (6 ft 5 in) | 95 kg (209 lb) | 335 cm (132 in) | 325 cm (128 in) |
| 10 | (Chinese Taipei) Tsung-Hsuan Wu | 9 July 1994 | 1.85 m (6 ft 1 in) | 75 kg (165 lb) | 325 cm (128 in) | 300 cm (120 in) |
| 11 | (Chinese Taipei) Chien-Feng Huang | 31 December 1990 | 1.95 m (6 ft 5 in) | 82 kg (181 lb) | 345 cm (136 in) | 332 cm (131 in) |
| 12 | (Chinese Taipei) Mei-Chung Hsu | 16 October 1991 | 1.88 m (6 ft 2 in) | 90 kg (200 lb) | 333 cm (131 in) | 300 cm (120 in) |
| 14 | (Chinese Taipei) Ming-Chun Wang | 30 July 1988 | 1.95 m (6 ft 5 in) | 90 kg (200 lb) | 323 cm (127 in) | 313 cm (123 in) |
| 17 | (Chinese Taipei) Pei-Hung Huang | 17 September 1990 | 1.88 m (6 ft 2 in) | 74 kg (163 lb) | 325 cm (128 in) | 321 cm (126 in) |
| 19 | (Chinese Taipei) Chien-Chen Chen (C) | 20 November 1989 | 1.88 m (6 ft 2 in) | 87 kg (192 lb) | 338 cm (133 in) | 325 cm (128 in) |

=== Tala'ea El-Gaish ===
The following is the roster of the Egyptian club Tala'ea El-Gaish in the 2016 FIVB Volleyball Men's Club World Championship.

Head coach: (Egypt) Sherif H. El Shemerly

| No. | Name | Date of birth | Height | Weight | Spike | Block |
|---|---|---|---|---|---|---|
| 1 | (Egypt) Ahmed El Sayed | 14 January 1991 | 1.84 m (6 ft 0 in) | 84 kg (185 lb) | 325 cm (128 in) | 312 cm (123 in) |
| 2 | (Egypt) Abdalsalam Abdallah | 10 October 1983 | 1.98 m (6 ft 6 in) | 82 kg (181 lb) | 336 cm (132 in) | 320 cm (130 in) |
| 4 | (Egypt) Ahmed Abdelhay | 19 August 1984 | 1.97 m (6 ft 6 in) | 87 kg (192 lb) | 342 cm (135 in) | 316 cm (124 in) |
| 5 | (Egypt) Ibrahim Sayed Abouhamoud | 1 January 1985 | 1.78 m (5 ft 10 in) | 60 kg (130 lb) | 293 cm (115 in) | 285 cm (112 in) |
| 6 | (Egypt) Mamdouh Abdelrehim | 5 August 1989 | 2.07 m (6 ft 9 in) | 90 kg (200 lb) | 338 cm (133 in) | 325 cm (128 in) |
| 7 | (Egypt) Mahmoud Abd El Kader | 12 May 1985 | 1.95 m (6 ft 5 in) | 94 kg (207 lb) | 342 cm (135 in) | 316 cm (124 in) |
| 8 | (Egypt) Mohamed Thakil | 12 July 1986 | 1.84 m (6 ft 0 in) | 71 kg (157 lb) | 326 cm (128 in) | 315 cm (124 in) |
| 9 | (Egypt) Rashad Atia (C) | 2 September 1986 | 2.01 m (6 ft 7 in) | 91 kg (201 lb) | 348 cm (137 in) | 342 cm (135 in) |
| 10 | (Cuba) Yosvany Hernandez Carbonell | 23 June 1991 | 2.00 m (6 ft 7 in) | 90 kg (200 lb) | 360 cm (140 in) | 338 cm (133 in) |
| 11 | (Egypt) Mohamed Elnafrawy | 9 June 1983 | 2.00 m (6 ft 7 in) | 92 kg (203 lb) | 335 cm (132 in) | 320 cm (130 in) |
| 14 | (Egypt) Omar Hassan | 4 April 1991 | 1.91 m (6 ft 3 in) | 104 kg (229 lb) | 333 cm (131 in) | 324 cm (128 in) |
| 15 | (Egypt) Islam Abdelkader | 9 February 1994 | 1.94 m (6 ft 4 in) | 85 kg (187 lb) | 319 cm (126 in) | 310 cm (120 in) |
| 20 | (Republic of the Congo) Ngampourou Ilouoni | 19 March 1989 | 2.05 m (6 ft 9 in) | 90 kg (200 lb) | 338 cm (133 in) | 312 cm (123 in) |
| 22 | (Egypt) Ahmed Abdelaal | 8 June 1989 | 1.88 m (6 ft 2 in) | 89 kg (196 lb) | 325 cm (128 in) | 312 cm (123 in) |

=== Zenit Kazan ===
The following is the roster of the Russian club Zenit Kazan in the 2016 FIVB Volleyball Men's Club World Championship.

Head coach: (Russia) Vladimir Alekno

| No. | Name | Date of birth | Height | Weight | Spike | Block |
|---|---|---|---|---|---|---|
| 1 | (United States) Matthew Anderson | 18 April 1987 | 2.02 m (6 ft 8 in) | 100 kg (220 lb) | 360 cm (140 in) | 332 cm (131 in) |
| 4 | (Russia) Ivan Demakov | 6 January 1993 | 2.09 m (6 ft 10 in) | 101 kg (223 lb) | 350 cm (140 in) | 330 cm (130 in) |
| 6 | (Russia) Evgeny Sivozhelez | 6 August 1986 | 1.96 m (6 ft 5 in) | 90 kg (200 lb) | 330 cm (130 in) | 320 cm (130 in) |
| 7 | (Bulgaria) Teodor Salparov | 16 August 1982 | 1.87 m (6 ft 2 in) | 77 kg (170 lb) | 320 cm (130 in) | 305 cm (120 in) |
| 9 | (Poland) Wilfredo León | 31 July 1993 | 2.02 m (6 ft 8 in) | 96 kg (212 lb) | 350 cm (140 in) | 346 cm (136 in) |
| 10 | (Russia) Artem Volvich | 22 January 1990 | 2.08 m (6 ft 10 in) | 96 kg (212 lb) | 350 cm (140 in) | 330 cm (130 in) |
| 11 | (Russia) Andrey Ashchev (C) | 10 May 1983 | 2.02 m (6 ft 8 in) | 105 kg (231 lb) | 350 cm (140 in) | 338 cm (133 in) |
| 12 | (Russia) Aleksandr Butko | 18 March 1986 | 1.98 m (6 ft 6 in) | 97 kg (214 lb) | 339 cm (133 in) | 327 cm (129 in) |
| 13 | (Russia) Igor Kobzar | 13 April 1991 | 1.98 m (6 ft 6 in) | 86 kg (190 lb) | 337 cm (133 in) | 315 cm (124 in) |
| 14 | (Russia) Alexander Gutsalyuk | 15 January 1988 | 2.05 m (6 ft 9 in) | 105 kg (231 lb) | 362 cm (143 in) | 345 cm (136 in) |
| 15 | (Russia) Denis Zemchenok | 11 August 1987 | 2.03 m (6 ft 8 in) | 93 kg (205 lb) | 350 cm (140 in) | 333 cm (131 in) |
| 16 | (Russia) Aleksey Verbov | 31 January 1982 | 1.86 m (6 ft 1 in) | 79 kg (174 lb) | 315 cm (124 in) | 310 cm (120 in) |
| 18 | (Russia) Maxim Mikhaylov | 19 March 1988 | 2.02 m (6 ft 8 in) | 103 kg (227 lb) | 350 cm (140 in) | 335 cm (132 in) |
| 19 | (Russia) Vladimir Melnik | 21 July 1980 | 2.00 m (6 ft 7 in) | 95 kg (209 lb) | 347 cm (137 in) | 338 cm (133 in) |

== Pool B ==
=== Personal Bolívar ===
The following is the roster of the Argentinian club Personal Bolívar in the 2016 FIVB Volleyball Men's Club World Championship.

Head coach: (Argentina) Javier Weber

| No. | Name | Date of birth | Height | Weight | Spike | Block |
|---|---|---|---|---|---|---|
| 2 | (Argentina) Maximiliano Gauna | 20 April 1989 | 1.97 m (6 ft 6 in) | 93 kg (205 lb) | 338 cm (133 in) | 320 cm (130 in) |
| 3 | (Argentina) Leonardo Patti (C) | 6 July 1978 | 1.88 m (6 ft 2 in) | 88 kg (194 lb) | 340 cm (130 in) | 320 cm (130 in) |
| 4 | (Argentina) Lucas Ocampo | 20 March 1986 | 1.96 m (6 ft 5 in) | 100 kg (220 lb) | 335 cm (132 in) | 318 cm (125 in) |
| 5 | (Argentina) Nahuel Codesal | 12 June 2000 | 1.84 m (6 ft 0 in) | 66 kg (146 lb) | 305 cm (120 in) | 293 cm (115 in) |
| 6 | (Australia) Thomas Edgar | 21 June 1989 | 2.12 m (6 ft 11 in) | 106 kg (234 lb) | 357 cm (141 in) | 341 cm (134 in) |
| 7 | (Argentina) Maximiliano Chirivino | 11 December 1989 | 1.78 m (5 ft 10 in) | 84 kg (185 lb) | 305 cm (120 in) | 288 cm (113 in) |
| 8 | (Denmark) Axel Jacobsen | 10 July 1984 | 1.96 m (6 ft 5 in) | 85 kg (187 lb) | 340 cm (130 in) | 328 cm (129 in) |
| 9 | (Argentina) Federico Franetovich | 13 October 1991 | 2.00 m (6 ft 7 in) | 90 kg (200 lb) | 342 cm (135 in) | 318 cm (125 in) |
| 10 | (Argentina) Nicolás Giraudo Escurra | 3 August 1994 | 2.01 m (6 ft 7 in) | 92 kg (203 lb) | 340 cm (130 in) | 321 cm (126 in) |
| 11 | (Spain) Pablo Sergio Koukartsev | 25 March 1993 | 2.03 m (6 ft 8 in) | 105 kg (231 lb) | 342 cm (135 in) | 322 cm (127 in) |
| 14 | (Argentina) Pablo Crer | 12 June 1989 | 2.05 m (6 ft 9 in) | 78 kg (172 lb) | 350 cm (140 in) | 330 cm (130 in) |
| 15 | (Bulgaria) Todor Aleksiev | 21 April 1983 | 2.04 m (6 ft 8 in) | 105 kg (231 lb) | 355 cm (140 in) | 340 cm (130 in) |
| 16 | (Argentina) Alexis González | 21 July 1981 | 1.84 m (6 ft 0 in) | 83 kg (183 lb) | 321 cm (126 in) | 310 cm (120 in) |
| 20 | (Brazil) Silmar Antonio De Almeida | 6 October 1986 | 2.00 m (6 ft 7 in) | 89 kg (196 lb) | 336 cm (132 in) | 315 cm (124 in) |

=== UPCN San Juan ===
The following is the roster of the Argentinian club UPCN San Juan in the 2016 FIVB Volleyball Men's Club World Championship.

Head coach: (Argentina) Fabian Armoa

| No. | Name | Date of birth | Height | Weight | Spike | Block |
|---|---|---|---|---|---|---|
| 1 | (Argentina) Pablo Guzmán | 6 April 1988 | 1.93 m (6 ft 4 in) | 94 kg (207 lb) | 350 cm (140 in) | 335 cm (132 in) |
| 2 | (Argentina) Gustavo Scholtis | 16 December 1982 | 2.06 m (6 ft 9 in) | 87 kg (192 lb) | 358 cm (141 in) | 338 cm (133 in) |
| 3 | (Argentina) Francisco Lloveras | 19 November 1991 | 2.02 m (6 ft 8 in) | 92 kg (203 lb) | 340 cm (130 in) | 315 cm (124 in) |
| 4 | (Argentina) Sebastián Garrocq | 27 November 1979 | 1.70 m (5 ft 7 in) | 63 kg (139 lb) | 320 cm (130 in) | 302 cm (119 in) |
| 5 | (Italy) Valerio Vermiglio | 1 March 1976 | 1.93 m (6 ft 4 in) | 85 kg (187 lb) | 342 cm (135 in) | 320 cm (130 in) |
| 6 | (Argentina) Mariano Vildosola | 30 January 1991 | 1.90 m (6 ft 3 in) | 85 kg (187 lb) | 330 cm (130 in) | 320 cm (130 in) |
| 7 | (Bulgaria) Nikolay Uchikov | 13 April 1986 | 2.07 m (6 ft 9 in) | 110 kg (240 lb) | 355 cm (140 in) | 330 cm (130 in) |
| 8 | (Brazil) Gustavo Guazzelli Bonatto | 2 January 1986 | 2.15 m (7 ft 1 in) | 102 kg (225 lb) | 350 cm (140 in) | 340 cm (130 in) |
| 9 | (Argentina) Sebastian Brajkovic | 10 February 1982 | 1.95 m (6 ft 5 in) | 100 kg (220 lb) | 310 cm (120 in) | 300 cm (120 in) |
| 10 | (Argentina) Nicolás Lazo | 16 April 1995 | 1.92 m (6 ft 4 in) | 90 kg (200 lb) | 339 cm (133 in) | 317 cm (125 in) |
| 13 | (Argentina) Santiago Alvarez | 27 April 1988 | 2.05 m (6 ft 9 in) | 87 kg (192 lb) | 338 cm (133 in) | 323 cm (127 in) |
| 14 | (Argentina) Javier Filardi (C) | 7 February 1980 | 1.90 m (6 ft 3 in) | 89 kg (196 lb) | 340 cm (130 in) | 318 cm (125 in) |
| 17 | (Argentina) Matias Salvo | 25 January 1991 | 1.82 m (6 ft 0 in) | 75 kg (165 lb) | 342 cm (135 in) | 312 cm (123 in) |
| 18 | (Argentina) Martín Ramos | 26 August 1991 | 1.97 m (6 ft 6 in) | 95 kg (209 lb) | 340 cm (130 in) | 315 cm (124 in) |

=== Trentino Diatec ===
The following is the roster of the Italian club Trentino Diatec in the 2016 FIVB Volleyball Men's Club World Championship.

Head coach: (Italy) Angelo Lorenzetti

| No. | Name | Date of birth | Height | Weight | Spike | Block |
|---|---|---|---|---|---|---|
| 2 | (Italy) Gabriele Nelli | 4 December 1993 | 2.10 m (6 ft 11 in) | 100 kg (220 lb) | 355 cm (140 in) | 320 cm (130 in) |
| 3 | (Italy) Matteo Burgsthaler | 18 February 1981 | 1.98 m (6 ft 6 in) | 96 kg (212 lb) | 350 cm (140 in) | 320 cm (130 in) |
| 4 | (Italy) Oleg Antonov | 28 July 1988 | 1.98 m (6 ft 6 in) | 86 kg (190 lb) | 346 cm (136 in) | 320 cm (130 in) |
| 5 | (Italy) Tiziano Mazzone | 22 July 1995 | 1.98 m (6 ft 6 in) | 95 kg (209 lb) | 350 cm (140 in) | 315 cm (124 in) |
| 6 | (Italy) Alessandro Blasi | 22 March 1992 | 1.92 m (6 ft 4 in) | 80 kg (180 lb) | 330 cm (130 in) | 320 cm (130 in) |
| 8 | (Italy) Matteo Chiappa | 6 July 1993 | 1.90 m (6 ft 3 in) | 85 kg (187 lb) | 345 cm (136 in) | 320 cm (130 in) |
| 9 | (Italy) Simone Giannelli | 9 August 1996 | 1.98 m (6 ft 6 in) | 92 kg (203 lb) | 350 cm (140 in) | 330 cm (130 in) |
| 10 | (Italy) Filippo Lanza (C) | 3 March 1991 | 1.98 m (6 ft 6 in) | 98 kg (216 lb) | 350 cm (140 in) | 330 cm (130 in) |
| 11 | (Argentina) Sebastián Solé | 12 June 1991 | 2.02 m (6 ft 8 in) | 88 kg (194 lb) | 350 cm (140 in) | 328 cm (129 in) |
| 12 | (Belgium) Simon Van De Voorde | 19 December 1989 | 2.08 m (6 ft 10 in) | 100 kg (220 lb) | 355 cm (140 in) | 320 cm (130 in) |
| 13 | (Italy) Massimo Colaci | 21 February 1985 | 1.88 m (6 ft 2 in) | 73 kg (161 lb) | 310 cm (120 in) | 290 cm (110 in) |
| 14 | (Czech Republic) Jan Štokr | 16 January 1983 | 2.05 m (6 ft 9 in) | 112 kg (247 lb) | 368 cm (145 in) | 341 cm (134 in) |
| 17 | (Slovenia) Tine Urnaut | 3 September 1988 | 2.00 m (6 ft 7 in) | 90 kg (200 lb) | 360 cm (140 in) | 343 cm (135 in) |
| 18 | (Italy) Daniele Mazzone | 4 June 1992 | 2.11 m (6 ft 11 in) | 88 kg (194 lb) | 315 cm (124 in) | 309 cm (122 in) |

=== Minas Tênis Clube ===
The following is the roster of the Brazilian club Minas Tênis Clube in the 2016 FIVB Volleyball Men's Club World Championship.

Head coach: (Brazil) Nery Tambeiro

| No. | Name | Date of birth | Height | Weight | Spike | Block |
|---|---|---|---|---|---|---|
| 1 | (Brazil) Maique Nascimento | 16 July 1997 | 1.82 m (6 ft 0 in) | 76 kg (168 lb) | 310 cm (120 in) | 255 cm (100 in) |
| 2 | (Brazil) Eduardo Sobrinho | 19 January 1996 | 1.88 m (6 ft 2 in) | 76 kg (168 lb) | 330 cm (130 in) | 310 cm (120 in) |
| 5 | (Brazil) Tiago Wesz | 12 February 1989 | 2.03 m (6 ft 8 in) | 98 kg (216 lb) | 334 cm (131 in) | 320 cm (130 in) |
| 6 | (Brazil) Bruno Felicio De Jesus | 4 April 1988 | 2.03 m (6 ft 8 in) | 92 kg (203 lb) | 345 cm (136 in) | 309 cm (122 in) |
| 7 | (Brazil) Thiago Gelinski | 24 June 1987 | 1.92 m (6 ft 4 in) | 101 kg (223 lb) | 322 cm (127 in) | 286 cm (113 in) |
| 8 | (Brazil) Willian Cesar Coelho Rabel | 28 February 1995 | 1.86 m (6 ft 1 in) | 84 kg (185 lb) | 333 cm (131 in) | 298 cm (117 in) |
| 9 | (Brazil) Samuel Fuchs | 4 March 1984 | 2.00 m (6 ft 7 in) | 89 kg (196 lb) | 342 cm (135 in) | 316 cm (124 in) |
| 10 | (Brazil) Thiago Vanole Nogueira Silva | 7 December 1994 | 1.88 m (6 ft 2 in) | 80 kg (180 lb) | 340 cm (130 in) | 302 cm (119 in) |
| 13 | (Brazil) Flavio Gualberto (C) | 22 April 1993 | 1.99 m (6 ft 6 in) | 84 kg (185 lb) | 356 cm (140 in) | 329 cm (130 in) |
| 14 | (Cuba) Yordan Bisset Astengo | 21 December 1994 | 2.00 m (6 ft 7 in) | 98 kg (216 lb) | 360 cm (140 in) | 330 cm (130 in) |
| 16 | (Brazil) Gabriel Franco | 27 April 1995 | 1.96 m (6 ft 5 in) | 88 kg (194 lb) | 335 cm (132 in) | 312 cm (123 in) |
| 17 | (Brazil) Petrus Silva | 5 May 1987 | 2.03 m (6 ft 8 in) | 77 kg (170 lb) | 339 cm (133 in) | 307 cm (121 in) |
| 20 | (Brazil) Aboubacar Dramé Neto | 16 February 1994 | 2.02 m (6 ft 8 in) | 85 kg (187 lb) | 348 cm (137 in) | 326 cm (128 in) |
