= Alex Díaz =

Alex Díaz may refer to:

- Alex Díaz (footballer, born 1989), Colombian football defender
- Alex Díaz (footballer, born 1999), Argentine football midfielder
- Alex Díaz de la Portilla (born 1964), Cuban-American politician
- Alex Diaz (outfielder) (born 1968), American baseball player

== See also ==
- Alexis Diaz (disambiguation)
