= 2019 COTIF Tournament =

2019 L'Alcúdia International Football Tournament
Tournament details
- Host country: Spain
- Dates: 29 July 2019 – 20 August 2019
- Teams: 5 (from 4 confederations)
- Venue: 1 (in 1 host city)

Final positions
- Champions: Spain (3rd title)
- Runners-up: Russia

Tournament statistics
- Matches played: 11
- Goals scored: 37 (3.36 per match)

The 2019 L'Alcúdia International Football Tournament was a football competition which took place in July and August 2019. The 2019 edition was the fourth to feature only international youth teams. Previous editions had contained a mix of national selections and club selections.

== Teams ==
The participating national teams are:

- Argentina
- Bahrain
- Mauritania
- Russia
- Spain

== Group stage ==
Pos	Team	Pld	W	D	L	GF	GA	GD	Pts	Qualification
1	Russia	4	3	0	1	11	3	+8	9	Semi-finals
2	Spain (H)	4	3	0	1	8	1	+7	9	Semi-finals
3	Argentina	4	3	0	1	10	4	+6	9	
4	Bahrain	4	1	0	3	3	12	−9	3	
5	Mauritania	4	0	0	4	1	13	−12	0	

(H) Hosts
29 July 2019
22:00 CEST

Bahrain	2–0	Mauritania
	Report

Estadi Municipal Els Arcs, Alcúdia
30 July 2019
22:00 CEST

Spain	2–0	Russia
	Report

Estadi Municipal Els Arcs, Alcúdia
31 July 2019
22:00 CEST

Mauritania	1–4	Argentina
Yahya 62'	Report	Solari 24'; Miljevic 40+2'; Cortes 43'; Navarro 85'

Estadi Municipal Els Arcs, Alcúdia
1 August 2019
22:30 CEST

Russia	5–1	Bahrain
Kortsov 23'; Suleymanov 37', 41'; Sadulaev 38'; Sevikyan 80'	Report	Al-Romaihi 10'

Estadi Municipal Els Arcs, Alcúdia
2 August 2019
22:30 CEST

Argentina	1–0	Spain
Miljevic 85'	Report

Estadi Municipal Els Arcs, Alcúdia
3 August 2019
22:30 CEST

Russia	3–0	Mauritania
Suleymanov 9'; Kortsov 40+1'; Maradishvili 42'	Report

Estadi Municipal Els Arcs, Alcúdia
4 August 2019
22:30 CEST

Bahrain	0–2	Spain
	Report	Tenas 26'; Collado 34'

Estadi Municipal Els Arcs, Alcúdia
5 August 2019
22:30 CEST

Argentina	0–3	Russia
	Report	Sevikyan 2', 6'; Litvinov 59'

Estadi Municipal Els Arcs, Alcúdia
6 August 2019
20:30 CEST

Spain	4–0	Mauritania
Alberto 16'; Latasa 17'; González 24'	Report

Estadi Municipal Els Arcs, Alcúdia
6 August 2019
22:30 CEST

Bahrain	0–5	Argentina
	Report

Estadi Municipal Els Arcs, Alcúdia

== Final ==
6 August 2019
22:00 CEST

Russia	0–4	Spain
		Teguia 26'; Gonzalez Bayon 31'; Baena 51'; Latasa 79'

Estadi Municipal Els Arcs, Alcúdia
