= Yadrian Escobar Silva =

Cuban volleyball player

Personal information
- Nationality: Cuban
- Born: July 12, 1988 (age 38)
- Height: 2.01 m (6 ft 7 in)
- Weight: 169 kg (373 lb)
- Spike: 364 cm (143 in)
- Block: 340 cm (134 in)

Volleyball information
- Position: Opposite
- Current club: (Brazil) Minas tênis Clube
- Number: 3

Career
- Years: Team
- 2014-2016 2015 2016-2018 2018-2019 2019-: (Brazil) Minas Tênis Clube (Qatar) Al Arabi Doha (Japan) Suntory Sunbirds (Argentina) Bolívar Vóley (Turkey) Ziraat Bankası Ankara

Yadrian Escobar Silva (born July 12, 1988) is a Cuban volleyball player, a member of the club Ziraat Bankası Ankara.

== Sporting achievements ==
=== Clubs ===
Qatar Cup:

- 2015

Argentina Championship:

- 2019

=== Individual ===
- 2014–15 Brazilian Superliga – Best Scorer
- 2015–16 Brazilian Superliga – Best Scorer
