= Club Ciudad de Bolívar =

Argentine sports club

Ciudad de Bolívar
- Full name: Club Ciudad de Bolívar
- Nicknames: Águilas; Celestes; Cele
- Founded: October 23, 2002; 23 years ago
- Ground: Estadio Municipal Eva Perón, San Carlos de Bolívar, Buenos Aires Province, Argentina
- Capacity: 4,000
- President: (Argentina) Sebastián García
- Manager: (Argentina) Maximiliano Cavallotti
- Coach: (Argentina) Diego Funes
- League: Primera Nacional
- 2025: Torneo Federal A Group A, 1st of 8th (promoted to Primera Nacional)
Home colours	Away colours

Club Ciudad de Bolívar, also known as Ciudad de Bolívar or Ciudad Bolívar, is an Argentine sports club based in San Carlos de Bolívar, Buenos Aires Province. The club, Founded on October 23, 2002, by the initiative of the renowned TV presenter and producer, sports leader and businessman Marcelo Tinelli, as a volleyball team. Since 2019, its main activity has been football. The club also offers amateur activities such as field hockey, swimming, kangoo jump, aerobic gymnastics, taekwondo, beach volleyball, and volleyball, and yoga.

It was founded in 2002 by the initiative of the renowned TV presenter and producer, sports leader and businessman Marcelo Tinelli; and in its first season in the Liga Argentina de Voleibol it became champion by beating Rojas Scholem in the final.

The volleyball team is one of the most successful clubs in Liga A1 with eight titles, winning the last one in 2019. It also won the South American Club Championship in 2010, which allowed it to play in the Club World Championship in Doha against the best teams in the world, where it finished in fourth place. It also won the first edition of the Copa Libertadores de Voleibol in 2018–2019, defeating the Brazilian team SESC Rio in the final, the Copa ACLAV five times, and on one occasion the Torneo Súper 8.

The football team currently plays in Primera Nacional, the second division of the Argentine football league system, after promoting in 2025. Bolívar plays its home games at the Estadio Municipal Eva Perón, inaugurated on October 12, 1947, with capacity for 4,000 spectators.

== History ==
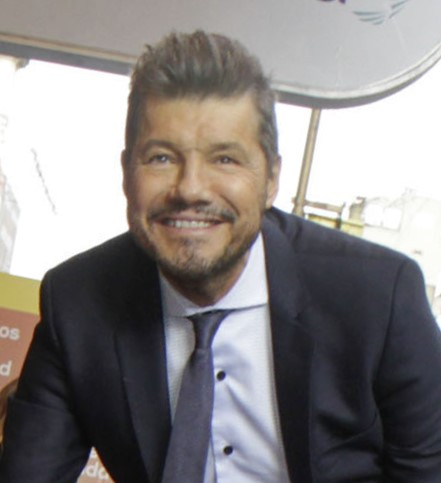
TV host and entrepreneur Marcelo Tinelli promoted the creation of the club

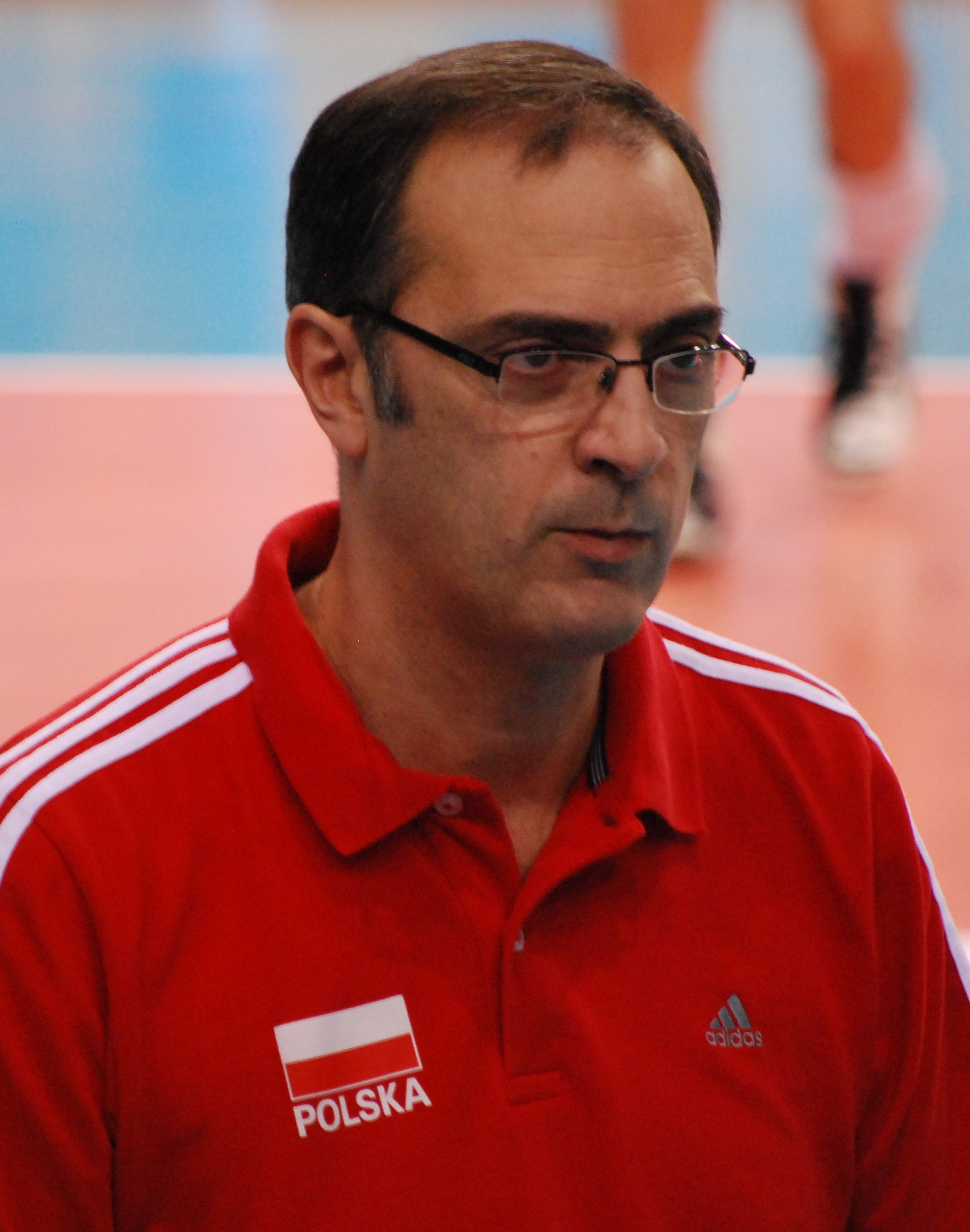
Daniel Castellani was the first coach of Bolívar

The club was founded on October 23, 2002, subsequent to that year's FIVB Men's World Championship held in Argentina. The club's foundation was initiative of TV host and entrepreneur Marcelo Tinelli (who was born in San Carlos de Bolívar).

Tinelli called former national team captain Daniel Castellani to the project, his vision was long-term: a unique club in South America, the development of youth divisions, the training of talent from across the country, and, of course, sporting success. "We came to stay," was the phrase he chose to explain his vision to the public.

=== Bolívar Signia (2002-2004) ===
The first professional team was formed in 17 days, and prominent figures in Argentine volleyball were presented wearing the light blue and white jersey that emulated the historic kit of the Bolívar football team. Castellani led the group, which included Sebastián Firpo, Guillermo Quaini, Sebastián Jabif, Eduardo Rodríguez, Mariano Baracetti, and the foreign players Pezão (Brazil), Iván Márquez (Venezuela), and Gabriel Gardner (USA). In their first season in the Argentine Volleyball A1 League, they began with an initial loss to Azul Vóley in their debut match, followed by an important victory in the memorable 2002-03 League final series against Rojas Scholem, where they were crowned champions after defeating them in the sixth match.

The next challenge was to achieve what no one had yet accomplished: a second consecutive championship. With that goal in mind, the team added Alejandro Spajic, Leonardo Patti, Guillermo García, and Marcelo Román, among others. Throughout the tournament, it became clear that the final would feature the "Eagles" and the tucumans team, Swiss Medical Monteros. In a memorable final, Bolívar Signia claimed their second championship title.

=== Orígenes Bolívar (2004-2006) ===
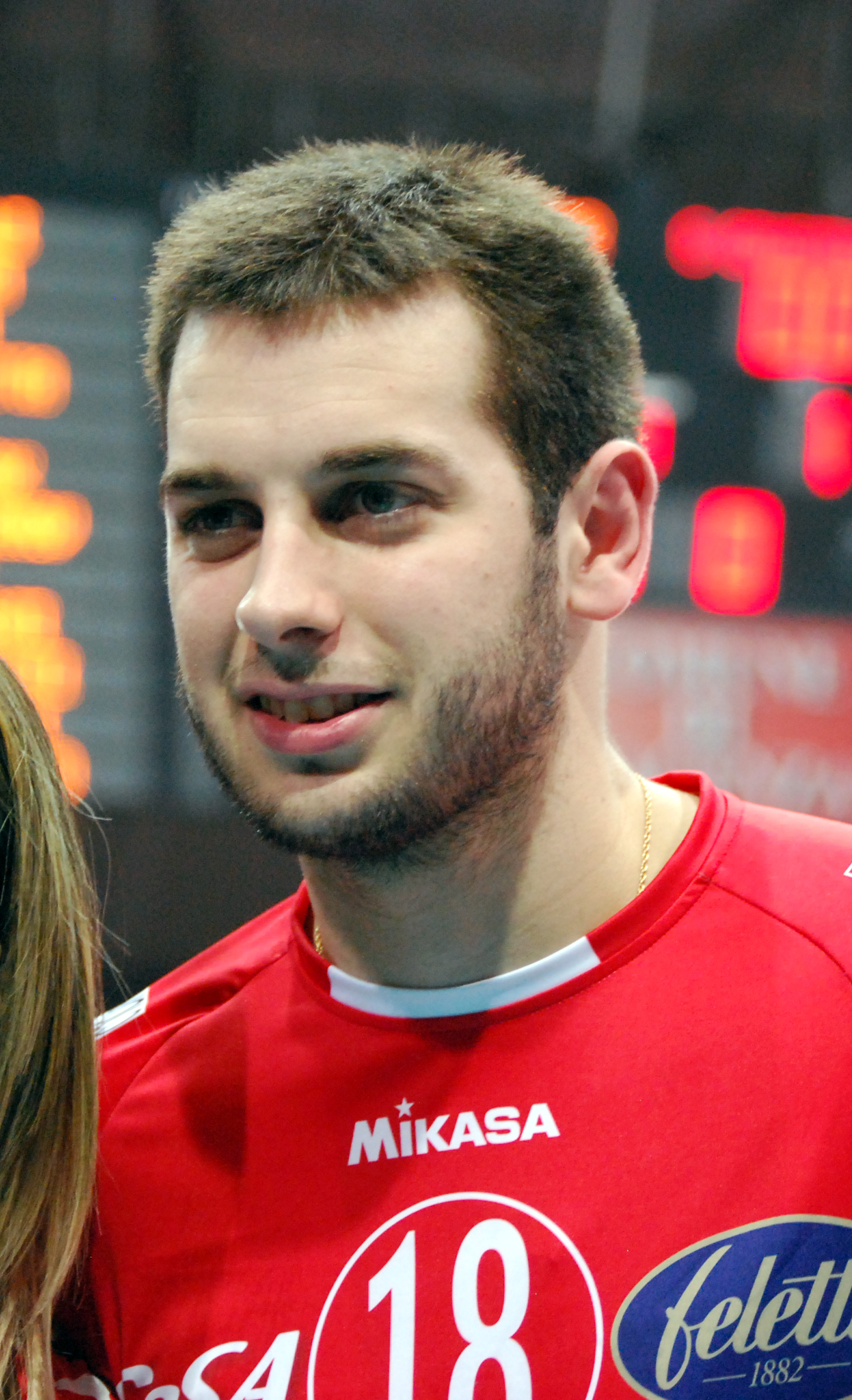
Luciano De Cecco made his debut in Bolívar in the 2005–06 season

Castellani and his team went in search of their third title in the following edition: for this purpose, they brought in Czech player Dalibor Polak, Venezuelan player Ronald Méndez, and Brazilian player Badá. The latter would become, over the years, one of the great idols of the "celeste" fans. A series of injuries prevented Bolívar from retaining the title, although they reached the final in 2004/05 against Swiss Medical Monteros.

A major overhaul was underway for the 2005–06 season. The team's leaders departed, and a younger squad was formed, led by Badá, Santiago Darraidou, Pablo Peralta, Guillermo García, and Gabriel Arroyo. Additionally, players recruited through the ambitious Talent Development Program made their debut: Luciano De Cecco, Diego Stepanenko, and Juan Pablo Alanis. The season's performance was somewhat inconsistent, but Orígenes Bolívar reached the podium after falling in the semifinals to Club de Amigos, the eventual champions. Simultaneously, Bolívar began participating in international tournaments without achieving resounding results, but with the conviction of gaining experience for the future.

=== DirecTV Bolívar (2006-2008) ===
In July 2006, a new era began with the arrival of Javier Weber. With a highly personal approach, the former setter implemented a different work style aimed at achieving international success (winning a tournament in Brazil) while also striving to conquer every tournament they entered in Argentina. The additions of Pablo Meana, William, and Wallace, the return of Alejandro Spajić, and the arrival of Javier Filardi strengthened the squad, creating an unbeatable team. With this core group, "DirecTV Bolívar" won the 2006 ACLAV Cup; two international trophies and the Argentine Volleyball A1 League, all without a single loss.

=== Drean Bolívar (2008–2012) ===
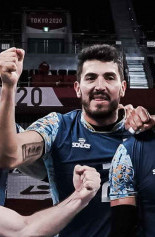
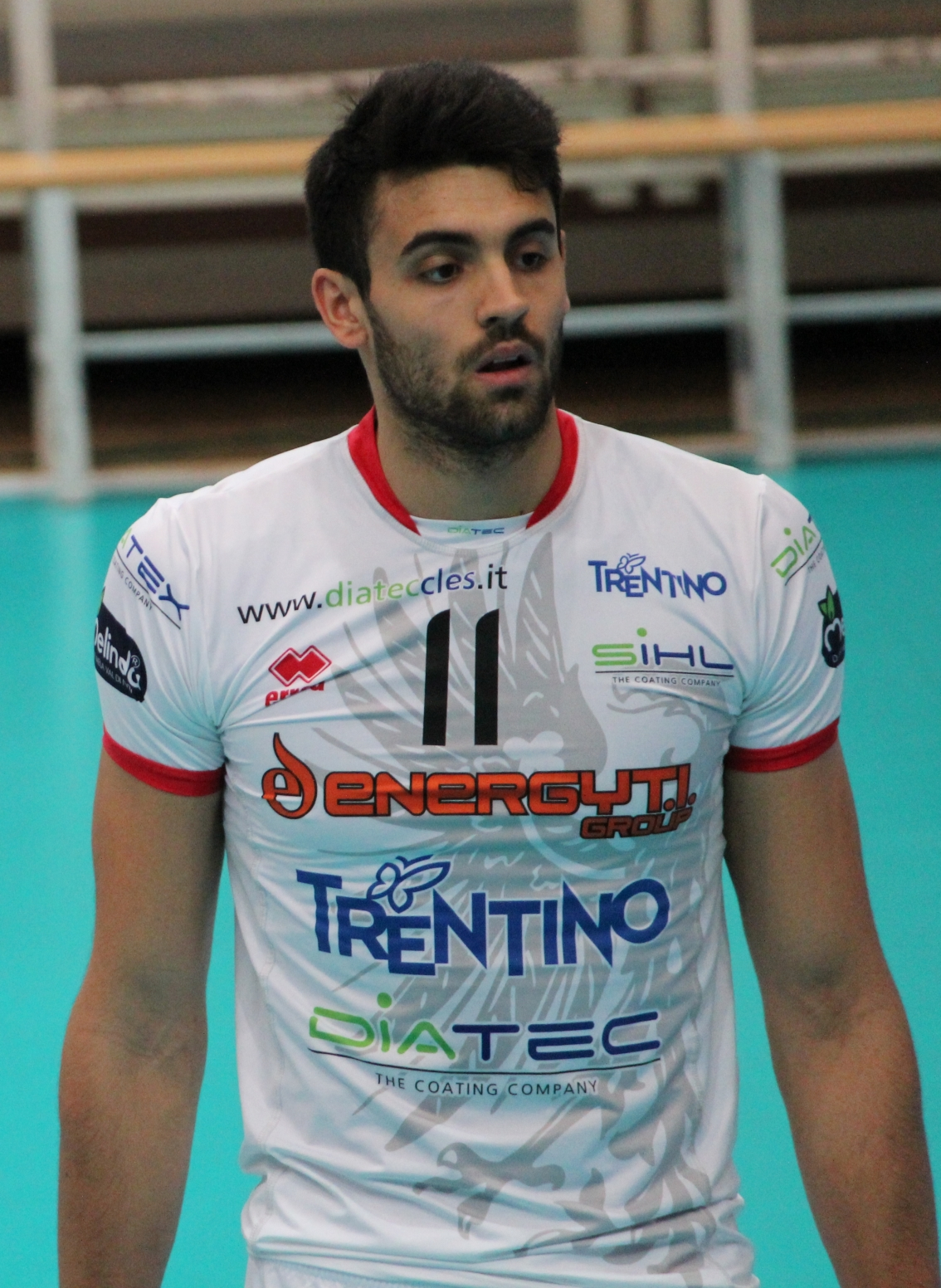
Federico Pereyra (left) and Sebastián Solé, players of Drean Bolívar

Under their new name, "Drean Bolívar", Weber and his team embarked on a successful tour of Europe, winning two cups; they then became champions of the 2007 Mercosur Cup, retaining the ACLAV Cup twice, in 2008 I and 2008 II, They also won the second edition of the Copa Ciudad de Bolívar, defeating Cimed Florianópolis of Brazil 3–2, and the Argentine Volleyball A1 League, becoming three-time consecutive champions. They also won the first edition of the Super 8, a tournament played in two locations, Monte Hermoso and Buenos Aires, where they defeated Mendoza Vóley in the final.

In 2009–10, "Drean Bolívar" confirmed its national leadership by winning the Argentine Volleyball A1 League for the fourth consecutive time, the ACLAV Cup and two international tournaments: the World Challenge Cup, 2009 and the Copa Ciudad de Bolívar, closing a successful cycle that remained in the history of volleyball in Argentina.

In the 2010/11 season, they could not repeat their success in the Argentine Volleyball A1 League (finishing as runners-up) or in the ACLAV Cup or the Super 8 (also finishing as runners-up), a quintet made up of young players from the national team (Luciano de Cecco, Federico Pereyra, Ocampo, Sebastián Solé, and Iván Castellani) secured the only spot for the continent's most prestigious tournament: the Club World Championship. After a victory in the South American Championship final against the powerful Cimed Florianópolis of Brazil, Bolívar defeated Dynamo Moscow, the European runners-up, in the tournament held in Doha, Qatar, and qualified for the semifinals. Their fourth-place finish set a precedent: the best performance by a national team in a Club World Championship.

In 2011–12, the franchise retained its two key players (Arroyo and Filardi) and signed a Brazilian setter and opposite hitter, a formula that had yielded positive results between 2006 and 2010: Thiago Gelinski and Evandro Guerra. In addition, they welcomed Serbian player Jekic, the experienced Gastón Giani, Rodrigo Villalba, and two stars of the Argentine National Team: Pablo Crer and Franco López. Alongside Solé and talented youth prospects, Bolívar was aiming to reclaim the national title in the increasingly competitive Argentine Volleyball A1 League, where they finished in 3rd place, and in the ACLAV Cup, where they were runners-up.

=== Personal Bolívar (2012–2018) ===
In the 2012–13 season, "Personal Bolívar" finished 3rd in the Argentine Volleyball A1 League and became champions for the first time in the third edition of the Master Cup. They were also champions of the Super 4, a tournament held at the "Néstor Kirchner Stadium" in Miramar, Buenos Aires Province. of the World Challenge Cup, held in Mar del Plata. and of the International Top Four, held in Ijuí, Brazil.

In the 2013–14 season, they finished 7th in the Argentine Volleyball A1 League and were runners-up in the Master Cup.

In the 2014–15 season, they won the fourth edition of the Copa Ciudad de Bolívar, and the Top Four International "Copa Almirante Brown". They were also runners-up in the Pre-South American "Copa Ciudad de Bolívar" and the Argentine Volleyball A1 League. They also won the ACLAV Cup.

For the 2015–16 season, he was runner-up in the fifth edition of the Copa Ciudad de Bolívar. He won the pre-South American Championship; "Copa Ciudad de Bolívar". South American Championship, which was held in Taubaté, Brazil, where he finished in 4th place. He was also champion of the Master Cup, runner-up of the Argentine Volleyball A1 League, and of the ACLAV Cup.

In the 2016–17 season, Bolívar was champion of the Argentine Volleyball A1 League, where he was crowned champion for the seventh time. He finished 3rd in the Master Cup, and 4th in the ACLAV Cup. The club also won the sixth edition of the Copa Ciudad de Bolívar, where they won 3–0 against SESC-RJ, from Brazil. He also won the Pre-South American; "Copa Ciudad de Bolívar". He was also runner-up in the South American Championship, in Montes Claros, Brazil, and finished 4th in the Club World Championship, held in Betim, Belo Horizonte, Brazil.

For the 2017–18 season, after a preparatory tour in Brazil, they finished as runners-up in the seventh edition of the Copa Ciudad de Bolívar, placed 4th in the Copa Ciudad de Morón; "Desafío Sudamericano" and finished 2nd in the Argentine Volleyball A1 League. They reached the semifinals of the Master Cup, and 3rd in the ACLAV Cup. They also finished 4th in the South American Championship in Montes Claros, Brazil, and in the Club World Championship, held in Poland, they finished in 7th place.

=== Bolívar Vóley (2018–2020) ===
Bolívar Vóley finished as runner-up in the eighth edition of the Copa Ciudad de Bolívar, where they lost 3–2 against SESC-RJ, from Brazil. They also became champions of the 1st Edition of the Copa Libertadores de Voleibol; 2018–19, after beating SESC-RJ 3–0 with sets of 25–23, 25-18 and 29–27. and were champions of the Argentine Volleyball A1 League; 2018/19, where they reached their eighth title.

In 2019–20, they finished as champions of the Supercup ACLAV, where they defeated Obras SJ 3–2. They also finished 3rd in the ACLAV Cup, runners-up in the 2020 Copa Libertadores de Voleibol, and 4th in the South American Championship in Contagem, Brazil. They were champions of the International Top Four held in Cochabamba, Bolivia. In the Argentine Volleyball A1 League, after scoring 51 points in the regular season and reaching the semifinals in the playoffs, ACLAV decided to end the season, leaving the tournament vacant, due to the coronavirus outbreak.

After 13 seasons, 6 league titles, 1 South American Championship, and 1 Copa Libertadores, Javier Weber said goodbye to the "Eagles."

After 18 years, for the 2020–21 season of the Argentine Volleyball League (ACLAV), Bolívar announced that it would not participate in the Argentine Volleyball A1 League.

Bolívar Vóley currently competes at an amateur level in the Olavarría Volleyball League, the Liga del Centro Bonaerense, and the Liga provincial Bonaerense de Voleibol. In 2021, they won the Torneo provincial de Clubes de Voleibol, while in 2022 they were crowned champions of the Torneo de Primera de la Liga Olavarriense. In May 2022, the first Copa Ciudad de Bolívar was held, where Bolívar Vóley finished third. In 2024, he won the Silver Cup at the closing of the Liga del Centro Bonaerense.

=== Entering into football (2019–present) ===
Bolívar decided to venture into football in 2019 and joined the "Liga Deportiva de San Carlos de Bolívar" to play in the regional competition. In 2020, they joined the "Liga de Pehuajó", and were invited to play in the 2020 Torneo Regional Federal Amateur by the Federal Council, the AFA division that administers provincial competitions. Bolívar achieved promotion to the Torneo Federal A, the third division of Argentine football, after defeating Independiente de Neuquén 3–0 in Carmen de Patagones.

That same year it began competing in football by affiliating with the Pehuajó League and participating in the Torneo Regional Federal Amateur 2020. In 2021, after defeating Independiente de Neuquén 3–0, it was promoted to the Torneo Federal A, the third division for teams indirectly affiliated with the AFA. On October 5, 2022, the "celestial eels" qualified for the Copa Argentina 2023, a football competition that brings together the 64 best teams in the country, for the first time in its history.

The first national competition contested by Club Bolívar was the 2023 Copa Argentina, where the team lost to Independiente 3–0. That same year the club reached the semi-final playoffs for promotion to Primera Nacional, where they were eliminated by Douglas Haig 2-1.

For the 2024 season, the club hired Héctor Storti as club manager. Where the club had its second participation in the Copa Argentina in the 2024 edition, the team lost to Banfield 6-0. That same year the club reached the semi-final playoffs for promotion to the Primera Nacional, where they were eliminated by Sarmiento la Banda 1-0.

For the 2025 season, Maximiliano Cavallotti and Martín Palisi were in charge of Bolívar's football department. Maximiliano Cavallotti, who played for "El Cele" until the 2024 season, has retired from playing and will be Ciudad's General Manager. Meanwhile, Palisi, a former Ciudad player in the 2022 season and most recently with Deportivo Español, had also retired from football and joined Bolívar as sporting secretary.

In June 2025, the squad managed by Cristian Piarrou celebrated winning the title awarded by the Unión Deportiva Regional, the Torneo Interligas.

In 2025 the team made their third appearance in Copa Argentina, when they lost to River Plate 2–0.

On October 19, 2025, they played the final of the Torneo Federal A against Atlético de Rafaela, defeating them after a scoreless draw during the ninety minutes and taking the lead in the penalty shootout by 5–4. Thus, they achieved promotion to the Primera Nacional for the first time in their history, where they will compete in the tournament during the year 2026.

On February 13, 2026, Bolívar made their historic debut in Primera Nacional in a 1–1 draw vs Godoy Cruz. Guillermo Sánchez was in charge of scoring the first goal in the history of Celestes in the Primera Nacional. In their return to the remodeled Eva Perón stadium, Bolívar drew 1–1 vs Los Andes on February 22, 2026. Brian Duarte was in charge of scoring the first goal in the history of Bolívar as a home team in Primera Nacional.

In 2026 the team made their fourth appearance in Copa Argentina again facing River Plate and being defeated 1–0 at Estadio Único de Villa Mercedes, San Luis.

== Infrastructure ==
=== Estadio Municipal Eva Perón ===
The municipal stadium (named in honor of Eva Perón, former first lady of Argentina), located at the entrance to Las Acollaradas Municipal Park, has a capacity for 4,000 spectators.

In May 2018, the Municipality of Bolívar, through the Directorate of Sports, carried out an important work, which consisted of the placement of the artificial irrigation of the playing field.

In August 2022, the current president of the Argentine Football Association and as president of the AFA Liga Profesional de Fútbol, Claudio Tapia, visited the club and the stadium. In the same month, Bolívar unveiled the improvements made to the stadium. These included renovations to the locker rooms and benches, upgrades to the main stand with the installation of over 400 seats for spectators, and renovations to the restrooms. Additionally, several sections of the stadium were painted, and the broadcast booths were refurbished to improve conditions for both local and visiting media.

In June 2025, Club Bolívar modernized the stadium's lighting system by installing 24 LED lights, a project that allowed it to play matches at night.

In February 2026 Club Bolívar renovated Eva Perón stadium to modernize its facilities for the Primera Nacional. It now features a covered grandstand, a new press area, and a VIP box section.

=== Estadio República de Venezuela ===
The Republic of Venezuela Stadium is located at the intersection of Venezuela and Centenario avenues and has a capacity for 3500 spectators.

In 2015 the stadium was renovated to expand its capacity.

=== Complejo José Domeño ===
The 'José Domeño' sports complex (named in honor of Marcelo's maternal grandfather), inaugurated on October 20, 2007, is one of the most important in the country. The club boasts a swimming pool, volleyball court, beach volleyball court, football pitch, locker rooms, restrooms, a gym, dormitories, a relaxation room, a conference room, hot tubs, a sauna, and a massage room.

On November 12, 2016, the Club celebrated the inauguration of its new synthetic turf hockey field. This project offers the club and the city of San Carlos de Bolívar a space unlike any other in the region. Measuring exactly 91.40 meters long and 55.00 meters wide, it will be used primarily for matches played by the Las Indias Hockey women's team in the Central League. In addition to the synthetic turf field, the project also included the construction of team benches, a perimeter fence, and a scorer's table.

The municipality (San Carlos de Bolívar) was in charge of leveling the property, a concrete perimeter (curb and gutter) that was required for the placement of the grass, the lighting and the perimeter fence.

In 2025, "El Cele" made progress in the construction of its new football field at El Domeño. The sports institution initiated a project that is committed to the development of football. The new football pitch will be located within El Domeño and represents a significant improvement in the club's infrastructure.

With the aim of concentrating most of the professional team's activity in one location, improving functionality, efficiency, and fostering a sense of belonging on a daily basis, the Club decided to move forward with the project of creating a space for the development of football.

It will be a 90 x 60 meter synthetic pitch, located next to the swimming pool and the hockey field.

Work is progressing rapidly on the project, which is expected to be completed by February 2025. This will provide the professional team with a training pitch, locker rooms, dormitories for team gatherings, a dining hall, a gym, and a physiotherapy room, all within the club.

There is also a plan for the team that competes in the Torneo Interligas and the Liga Deportiva de Bolívar to play its home games at the Domeño, freeing up the Estadio Municipal Eva Perón for the Primera B Nacional. This is a positive initiative that reflects the club's desire for growth, not only in terms of its football program but also its institutional development.

The club possesses top-quality fields for hockey and volleyball, as well as a gym and other facilities.

== Football ==
=== Current squad ===
As of 29 June 2026, source: Note: Flags indicate national team as defined under FIFA eligibility rules; some limited exceptions apply. Players may hold more than one non-FIFA nationality.

No.	Pos.	Nation	Player
2	DF	ARG	Elías Martínez
3	DF	ARG	Nicolás Ihitz
4	DF	ARG	Agustín Paredes
5	MF	ARG	Thiago Rodriguez
6	DF	ARG	Federico Peralta
7	FW	ARG	Guillermo Sánchez
8	MF	ARG	Brian Quintana
9	FW	ARG	Jonathan Maciel
11	MF	ARG	Maximiliano Gutiérrez
12	GK	ARG	Jorge Ruiz
13	DF	ARG	Jonathan Chacón
14	DF	ARG	Tobías Fernández
15	MF	ARG	Tomás Guiacobini (on loan from Sarmiento (J))
16	DF	ARG	Áxel Carrión
17	MF	ARG	Alex Díaz

No.	Pos.	Nation	Player
18	MF	ARG	Facundo Mucignat
19	FW	ARG	Brian Duarte
20	FW	ARG	Lautaro Villegas
21	FW	ARG	Francisco Ilarregui (on loan from Argentinos Juniors)
22	MF	ARG	Marcos Sotelo
23	GK	ARG	Agustín Rufinetti
24	GK	ARG	Enzo Álvarez
25	MF	ARG	Nahuel Yeri (captain)
26	DF	ARG	Joel Ledesma
27	MF	ARG	Elías Romero
28	FW	ARG	Agustín Díaz
29	FW	ARG	Tomás Rambert (on loan from Independiente)
33	DF	ARG	Ezequiel Navarro
35	MF	ARG	Arnaldo González
37	FW	ARG	Khalil Caraballo

=== Out on loan ===
Note: Flags indicate national team as defined under FIFA eligibility rules; some limited exceptions apply. Players may hold more than one non-FIFA nationality.

No.	Pos.	Nation	Player
—	GK	ARG	Gonzalo Laborda (at Racing de Córdoba until 31 December 2026)
—	FW	ARG	Camilo García (at Maderense until 31 December 2026)

=== Individual records ===
==== Most appearances ====
- Updated June 29, 2026.

No.	Player	Pos.	Tenure	Match.
1	(Argentina) Nahuel Yeri	MF	2022–present	119
2	(Argentina) Ignacio Lucero	DF	2022–25	103
3	(Argentina) Maximiliano Cavallotti	GK	2022–24	102
4	(Argentina) Brian Duarte	FW	2022–23, 2025–present	92
5	(Argentina) Alfredo Troncoso	FW	2020–21, 2022–24	89

- Includes all competitions

==== Top scorers ====
- Updated June 29, 2026.

No.	Player	Pos.	Tenure	Goals
1	(Argentina) Alfredo Troncoso	FW	2020–21, 2022–24	36
2	(Argentina) Luciano Vázquez	FW	2021, 2022–2024	18
3	(Argentina) Nahuel Yeri	MF	2022–present	14
4	(Argentina) Khalil Caraballo	FW	2025–present	14
5	(Argentina) Gonzalo Urquijo	FW	2023–2024	13

- Includes all competitions

=== Current coaching staff ===
Position	Staff
Head coach	(Argentina) Diego Funes
Assistant coach	(Argentina) César González
Fitness coach	(Argentina) Emmanuel Battistessa
Fitness coach	(Argentina) Sebastián Cuello
Goalkeeping coach	(Argentina) Guillermo Vazquez
Goalkeeping coach	(Argentina) Ezequiel Rocca
Kinesiologist	(Argentina) Marcelo Cabrera
Kinesiologist	(Argentina) Tirso Pato
Professional football manager	(Argentina) Maximiliano Cavallotti
Professional football manager	(Argentina) Pedro Galván
Sports Secretary	(Argentina) Martín Palisi

Last updated: 7 February 2026

=== Managers ===
In italics the interim managers on the team.

- (Argentina) Mauricio Peralta (2019–22)
- (Argentina) Hernán Darío Ortiz (2022–23)
- (Argentina) Cristian Piarrou (2023)
- (Argentina) Manuel Fernández (2023)
- (Argentina) Cristian Piarrou (2023)
- (Argentina) Diego Funes (2023–24)
- (Argentina) Hernán Darío Ortiz (2024)
- (Argentina) Cristian Piarrou (2024)
- (Argentina) Diego Funes (2025–present)

=== Presidents ===
- List of presidents in the history of football
- (Argentina) Franco González (2021–22)
- (Argentina) Juan Pablo Tello (2023–24)
- (Argentina) Sebastián García (2025–present)

== Volleyball ==
Volleyball had official participation from 2002/03 until 2019/20.

=== Names ===
==== Historical names for sponsorship reasons in volleyball. ====
- Bolívar Signia (2002–2004)
- Orígenes Bolívar (2004–2006)
- DirecTV Bolívar (2006–2008)
- Drean Bolívar (2008−2012)
- Personal Bólivar (2012–2018)
- Bolívar Vóley (2018–2020)

=== Players ===
==== The following names are important, outstanding, historic players who played volleyball. ====
- (Argentina) Sebastián Firpo
- (Argentina) Guillermo Quaini
- (Argentina) Sebastián Jabif
- (Argentina) Eduardo Rodríguez
- (Argentina) Mariano Baracetti
- (Argentina) Alejandro Spajic
- (Argentina) Leonardo Patti
- (Argentina) Guillermo García
- (Argentina) Marcelo Román
- (Argentina) Santiago Darraidou
- (Argentina) Pablo Peralta
- (Argentina) Gabriel Arroyo
- (Argentina) Luciano de Cecco
- (Argentina) Diego Stepanenko
- (Argentina) Juan Pablo Alanís
- (Argentina) Pablo Meana
- (Argentina) Javier Filardi
- (Argentina) Agustín Loser
- (Argentina) Nicolás Uriarte
- (Argentina) Alexis González
- (Argentina) Facundo Imhoff
- (Argentina) Sebastián Solé
- (Argentina) Pablo Crer
- (Argentina) Agustín Ramonda
- (Argentina) Lucas Ocampo
- (Argentina) Federico Pereyra
- (Argentina) Matí Sánchez
- (Argentina) Ignacio Bernasconi
- (Argentina) Bruno Lima
- (Argentina) Joaquín Gallego
- (Argentina) Nicolás Bruno
- (Argentina) Martín Hernández
- (Argentina) Maximiliano Gauna
- (Argentina) Demián González
- (Argentina) Jan Martínez
- (Argentina) Maximiliano Chirivino
- (Argentina) Pablo Kukartsev
- (Argentina) Brian Melgarejo
- (Argentina) Franco Medina
- (Argentina) Iván Castellani
- (Argentina) Gastón Giani
- (Argentina) Maximiliano Cavanna
- (Argentina) Rodrigo Villalba
- (Argentina) Edgardo Lioca
- (Argentina) Luciano Roitero
- (Brazil) Badá
- (Brazil) Pezão
- (Brazil) William
- (Brazil) Wallace
- (Brazil) "Junior" Souza
- (Brazil) Giba
- (Brazil) Raphael Thiago Oliveira
- (Brazil) Théo Lopes
- (Brazil) Lucas Madalóz
- (Brazil) Tuba
- (Brazil) Thiago Gelinski
- (Brazil) Tiago Barth
- (Brazil) Pía
- (Brazil) Evandro Guerra
- (Brazil) Gustavo Folle Weber
- (Venezuela) Ronald Méndez
- (Venezuela) Iván Márquez
- (Cuba) Osniel Melgarejo
- (Cuba) Yadrian Escobar
- (Cuba) Raydel Hierrezuelo
- (Cuba) Yadier Sánchez
- (Cuba) Jesús Herrera
- (Cuba) Yohan León
- (Cuba) Ángel Dennis
- (Cuba) Michael Sánchez Bozhulev
- (United States) Gabriel Gardner
- (United States) Donald Suxho
- (United States) Mike Diehl
- (Serbia) Vladimir Jekić
- (Serbia) Miloš Nikić
- (Bulgaria) Rozalin Penchev
- (Bulgaria) Todor Aleksiev
- (Czech Republic) Dalibor Polak
- (Denmark) Axel Jacobsen
- (Belgium) Frank Depestele
- (Montenegro) Miloš Ćulafić
- (France) Julien Lyneel
- (Italy) Franco Giachetta
- (Australia) Thomas Edgar

=== Managers ===
==== The following names are the coaches who have worked in volleyball. ====
- (Argentina) Daniel Castellani (2002–2006)
- (Argentina) Rodrigo Martínez Granados (2013–2014)
- (Argentina) Javier Weber (2006–2013) - (2014–2020)

=== Presidents ===
==== The following names are the presidents who have served in Volleyball. ====
- (Argentina) Marcela Esnaola (2014–2019)

== Titles ==
=== Volleyball ===
==== Official tournaments ====
National tournaments (17)

- Liga Argentina A1 (8): 2002–03, 2003–04, 2006–07, 2007–08, 2008–09, 2009–10, 2016–17, 2018–19
  - Runner-up (5): (2004–05, 2010–11, 2014–15, 2015-16 y 2017–18)
- Copa Argentina (5): 2006, 2007, 2008, 2009, 2014
  - Runner-up (2): (2011-12 y 2015–16)
- Copa Máster (2): 2012, 2015
  - Runner-up (1): (2013)
- Supercopa ACLAV (1): 2019–20
- Torneo Súper 8 (1): 2008–09
  - Runner-up (1): (2010–11)

International tournaments

- South American Volleyball Club Championship (1): 2010
  - Runner-up (1): 2017
- Copa Libertadores (1): 2018-19

==== Friendly tournaments ====
- Copa Internacional Ciudad Bolívar (5): 2006, 2008, 2009, 2014, 2016
  - Runner-up: 2015, 2017, 2018
- Copa Grand prix San Ludgero (Brazil) (1): 2006
- Copa 75º Aniversario Federación Metropolitana (1): 2007
- Supercopa MERCOSUR (1) : 2007
  - Runner-up: 2006
- Copa Internacional Courmayeur (Italy) (1): 2007
- Copa Ciudad de Manacor (Spain) (1): 2007
- Copa World Challenge Club Volleyball (3) : 2008, 2009, 2012
  - Runner-up: (2011)
- Top Four Internacional; "Copa Banco Provincia", Tortuguitas (1): 2009
- Top Four Internacional (Brazil) (1): 2012
- Top Four, Miramar : (2012)
- Top Four Internacional de Almirante Brown (1): 2014
- Top Four Pre-Sudamericano; "Copa Ciudad de Bolívar" (2) : 2016, 2017
  - Runner-up: (2015)
- Top Four Internacional (Bolivia) (1): 2019

=== Football ===
- Torneo Regional Federal Amateur (1): 2020–21
- Liga Deportiva de Bolívar (1): 2022
- Torneo Interligas (1): 2025
- Torneo Federal A (1): 2025
