= Estadio Ruca Che =

Ruca Che Stadium
- Estadio Ruca Che

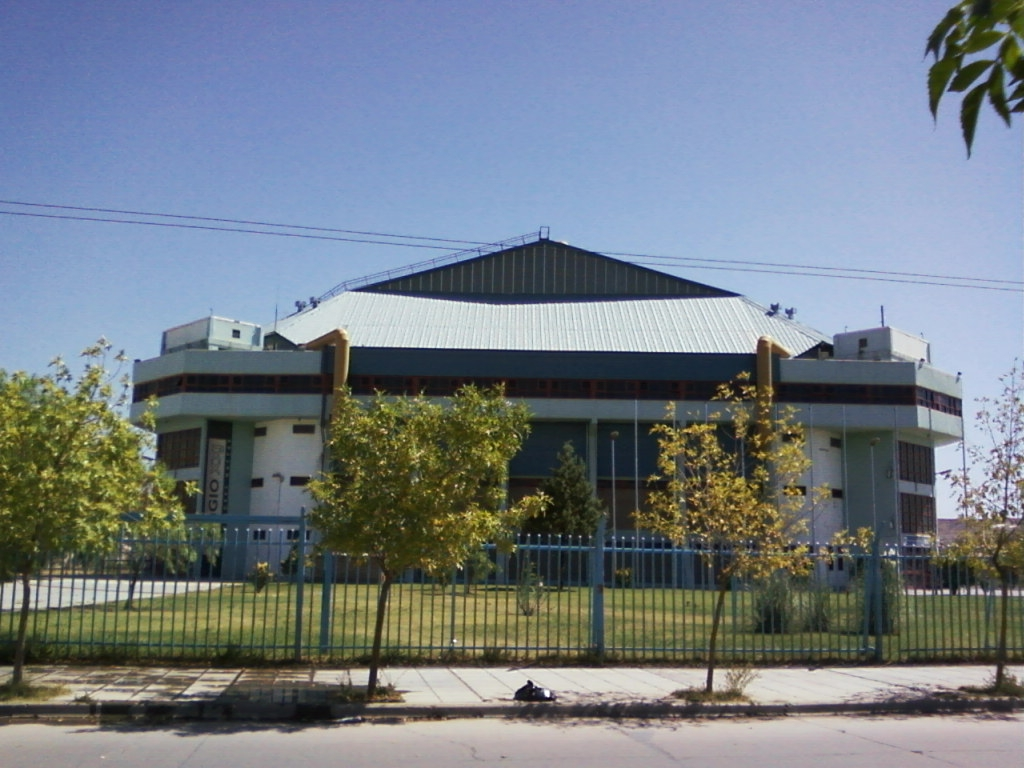
- The stadium in 2009
- Interactive map of Ruca Che Stadium
- Location: Neuquén, Argentina
- Coordinates: 38.94661°S 68.11390°W
- Capacity: 8,000
- Surface: 2.500 m2

Construction
- Opened: 21 August 1995; 31 years ago
- Cost: 6 million USD
- Architect: AIASA

Tenants
- Independiente (N) basketball Gigantes del Sur

Estadio Ruca Che is an indoor arena and multi-purpose stadium in the city of Neuquén, capital of the homonymous province and largest city in the Argentine Patagonia. It was built in 1995 to host the Americas Basketball Championship.

The name of this sport venue is in the mapuche language: the word Ruka means house while Che means people. Therefore, this is the House of the People.

Two teams make use of the stadium regularly. Gigantes del Sur plays its home matches for the Serie A1, the top level of the Argentine men's volleyball league system, while Independiente de Neuquén plays some of their home matches for the Torneo Federal de Básquetbol, the third level of the Argentine basketball league system, after the Liga Nacional de Básquet and the Torneo Nacional de Ascenso.

It also has an auxiliary gym, outdoor basketball courts and volleyball facilities, and parking lot for 150 vehicles.

== Sporting events ==
- 1995 Americas Basketball Championship
- 2001 Americas Basketball Championship

== Concerts ==
Some of the artists that have played at this stadium are Alejandro Lerner, Attaque 77, Bersuit Vergarabat, Catupecu Machu, Charly García, Chayanne, Diego Torres, Divididos, Europe, Joan Manuel Serrat, Jorge Rojas, La Ley, La Renga, Los Piojos, La Mona Jiménez, León Gieco, Luis Eduardo Aute, Los Nocheros, Maná, Mercedes Sosa, Víctor Heredia, Marco Antonio Solís, Ismael Serrano, Soledad Pastorutti, The Wailers, Manu Chao, Gustavo Cerati, Celia Cruz, Ricardo Montaner, José Luis Perales, Marcos Witt, Danilo Montero, Violetta, Roxette, Les Luthiers, No Te Va Gustar, Ricky Martin and Calle 13.

Preceded by San Juan, Puerto Rico	FIBA Americas Championship; Final Venue; 1995	Succeeded by Montevideo, Uruguay
Preceded by Roberto Clemente Coliseum; San Juan, Puerto Rico	FIBA Americas Championship; Final Venue; 2001	Succeeded by Roberto Clemente Coliseum; San Juan, Puerto Rico
