= San Carlos de Bolívar =

Town in Buenos Aires Province, Argentina

- Town
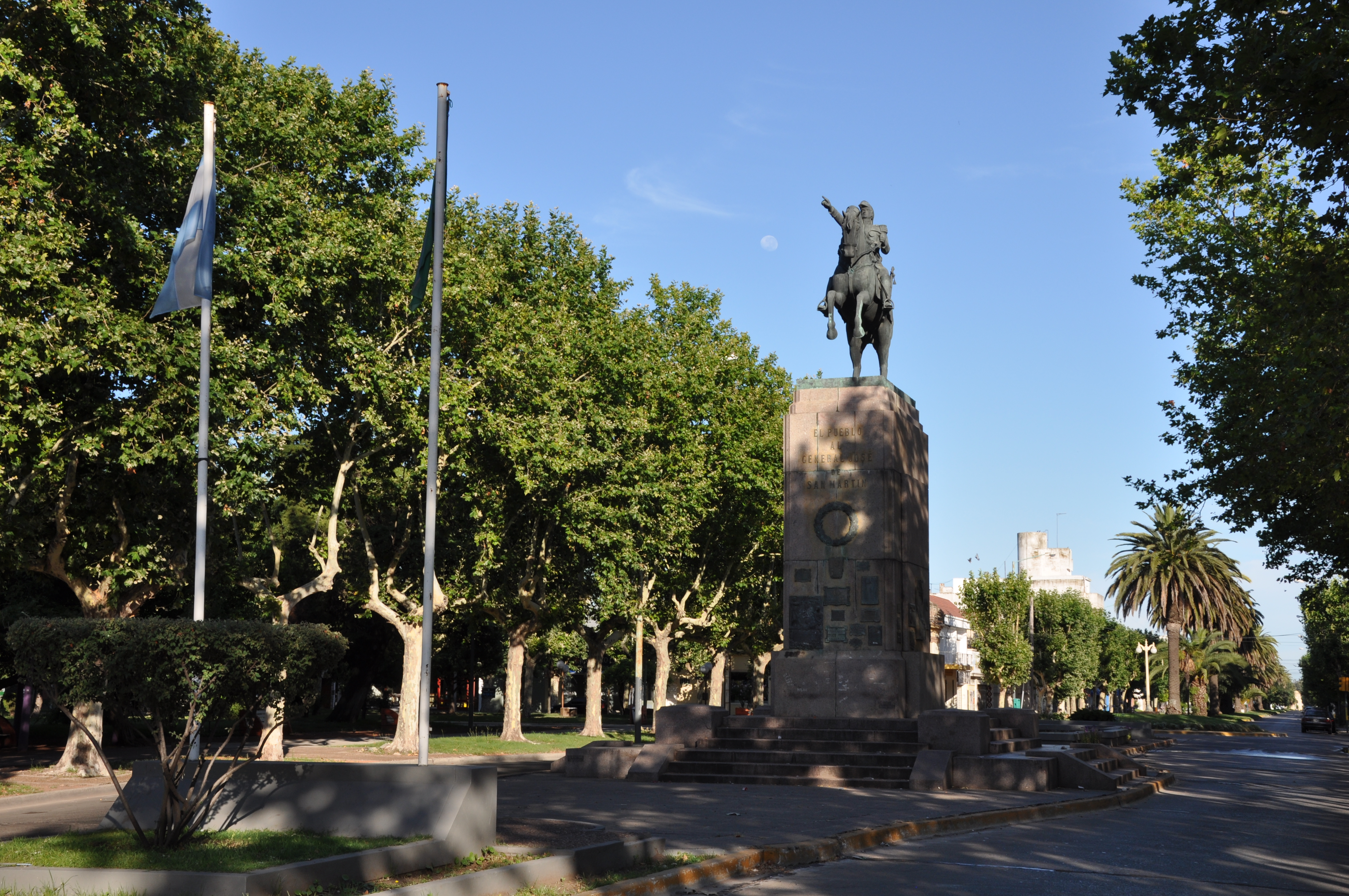

- Location in Argentina
- Coordinates: 36°15′S 61°06′W
- Country: Argentina
- Province: Buenos Aires
- Partido: Bolívar
- Founded: 2 March 1878
- Elevation: 102 m (335 ft)

Population (2010 census [INDEC])
  - Total: 26,242
- CPA Base: B 6550
- Area code: +54 2314
- Climate: Cfa

San Carlos de Bolívar (or simply Bolívar) is a town in Buenos Aires Province, Argentina. It is the administrative centre for Bolívar Partido.

The Instituto Nacional de Tecnología Agropecuaria has a campus in Bolívar.

San Carlos de Bolívar is the hometown of the Club Ciudad de Bolívar, the most successful team of the Argentine volleyball league.

== Climate ==
Climate data for San Carlos de Bolívar (1991–2020, extremes 1961–present)
Month	Jan	Feb	Mar	Apr	May	Jun	Jul	Aug	Sep	Oct	Nov	Dec	Year
Record high °C (°F)	41.6 (106.9)	39.1 (102.4)	37.3 (99.1)	36.6 (97.9)	30.5 (86.9)	26.1 (79.0)	28.6 (83.5)	35.4 (95.7)	32.1 (89.8)	38.5 (101.3)	36.5 (97.7)	42.4 (108.3)	42.4 (108.3)
Mean daily maximum °C (°F)	29.6 (85.3)	28.3 (82.9)	26.1 (79.0)	22.0 (71.6)	17.8 (64.0)	14.6 (58.3)	13.8 (56.8)	16.6 (61.9)	18.8 (65.8)	21.7 (71.1)	25.3 (77.5)	28.6 (83.5)	21.9 (71.4)
Daily mean °C (°F)	22.3 (72.1)	21.0 (69.8)	18.8 (65.8)	14.8 (58.6)	11.4 (52.5)	8.3 (46.9)	7.3 (45.1)	9.4 (48.9)	11.8 (53.2)	15.2 (59.4)	18.4 (65.1)	21.2 (70.2)	15.0 (59.0)
Mean daily minimum °C (°F)	15.0 (59.0)	14.1 (57.4)	12.3 (54.1)	9.2 (48.6)	6.2 (43.2)	3.1 (37.6)	2.0 (35.6)	3.6 (38.5)	5.6 (42.1)	8.9 (48.0)	11.4 (52.5)	13.7 (56.7)	8.8 (47.8)
Record low °C (°F)	3.9 (39.0)	2.9 (37.2)	0.2 (32.4)	−3.5 (25.7)	−6.2 (20.8)	−8.5 (16.7)	−9.1 (15.6)	−8.7 (16.3)	−6.2 (20.8)	−3.0 (26.6)	−0.8 (30.6)	2.6 (36.7)	−9.1 (15.6)
Average precipitation mm (inches)	113.8 (4.48)	106.0 (4.17)	133.0 (5.24)	106.7 (4.20)	58.7 (2.31)	37.8 (1.49)	35.4 (1.39)	41.2 (1.62)	68.2 (2.69)	118.9 (4.68)	94.8 (3.73)	103.6 (4.08)	1,018.1 (40.08)
Average precipitation days (≥ 0.1 mm)	8.3	7.0	7.6	8.1	6.3	4.9	5.3	4.4	6.0	9.5	8.4	8.2	83.9
Average snowy days	0.0	0.0	0.0	0.0	0.1	0.0	0.1	0.0	0.0	0.0	0.0	0.0	0.1
Average relative humidity (%)	68.5	73.8	77.2	78.5	81.8	81.2	79.8	75.0	72.9	73.7	69.0	66.0	74.8
Mean monthly sunshine hours	300.7	248.6	238.7	186.0	161.2	138.0	148.8	186.0	198.0	223.2	270.0	300.7	2,599.9
Mean daily sunshine hours	9.7	8.8	7.7	6.2	5.2	4.6	4.8	6.0	6.6	7.2	9.0	9.7	7.1
Percentage possible sunshine	67.3	65.3	61.7	49.9	52.4	43.7	50.1	57.6	53.3	54.2	62.6	63.5	56.8
Source: Servicio Meteorológico Nacional (percent sun 1991–2000)
