= Rodrigo Villalba =

Argentine volleyball player (born 1985)

Personal information
- Nationality: Argentine
- Born: 8 April 1985 (age 41)
- Height: 190 cm (6 ft 3 in)
- Weight: 88 kg (194 lb)
- Spike: 350 cm (138 in)
- Block: 335 cm (132 in)

Volleyball information
- Number: 25 (national team)

Career
Years	Teams
2015	Gigantes del Sur

National team
2015	Argentina

Rodrigo Villalba (born 8 April 1985) is an Argentine male volleyball player. He is part of the Argentina men's national volleyball team. At club level he plays for Gigantes del Sur.
