= Urdampilleta =

- Town
- Location within Buenos Aires Province
- Coordinates: 36°25′49″S 61°25′18″W
- Country: Argentina
- Province: Buenos Aires
- Partidos: Bolívar
- Elevation: 116 m (381 ft)

Population (2001 Census)
  - Total: 2,524
- Time zone: UTC−3 (ART)
- CPA Base: B 6553
- Climate: Dfc

Urdampilleta is a town located in the Bolívar Partido in the province of Buenos Aires, Argentina.

== History ==
In 1876, a fort was ordered to be constructed in what would become the town. A railway station was inaugurated in 1904, which would mark the beginning of a settlement in the area. A request was placed for Urdampilleta to be incorporated as a town in 1922.

== Population ==
According to INDEC, which collects population data for the country, the town had a population of 2,524 people as of the 2001 census.
