= Cristian Piarrou =

Argentine footballer

Personal information
- Full name: Cristian Daniel Piarrou
- Date of birth: May 19, 1988 (age 38)
- Place of birth: La Plata, Argentina
- Height: 1.69 m (5 ft 7 in)
- Position: Right back

Youth career
- Gimnasia LP

Senior career*
Years	Team	Apps	(Gls)
2007–2015	Gimnasia LP	62	(1)
2009	→ Quilmes (loan)	0	(0)
2013–2014	→ Villa San Carlos (loan)	18	(0)
2015–2016	San Martín Tucumán	22	(0)
2016–2018	Sarmiento Resistencia	40	(0)
2020–2022	Ciudad Bolívar	16	(0)
- * Club domestic league appearances and goals as of 15:10, 8 January 2026 (UTC)

Cristian Daniel Piarrou (born 19 May 1988), is an Argentine exfootball defender he played as a right-back. He currently manages the Ciudad Bolívar reserve team, which competes in the local league, Liga Deportiva de Bolívar, and the Torneo Interligas de Fútbol in Argentina.

== Career ==
Piarrou began his playing career in 2007 with Gimnasia y Esgrima de La Plata. He made his league debut on 25 February 2007 in a 2–0 home win against Gimnasia y Esgrima de Jujuy.

In 2009 after making 32 first team appearances for Gimnasia, Piarrou dropped down a division to join Quilmes of Primera B Nacional.

He retired from professional football in February 2022, his last team was Ciudad Bólivar.
