= 2015 FIVB Volleyball Men's Club World Championship =

2015 Men's Club World Championship
Tournament details
- Host country: Brazil
- Dates: 27–31 October
- Teams: 6 (from 5 confederations)
- Venue: 1 (in 1 host city)

Final positions
- Champions: (Brazil) Sada Cruzeiro (2nd title)

Tournament awards
- MVP: (Cuba) Yoandy Leal (SDC)

Tournament statistics
- Matches played: 10
- Attendance: 25,420 (2,542 per match)

The 2015 FIVB Volleyball Men's Club World Championship was the 11th edition of the event. It was held in Betim, Brazil from 27 to 31 October 2015.

== Qualification ==
Team (Confederation)	Qualified as
(Brazil) Sada Cruzeiro (CSV)	Hosts
(Egypt) Al-Ahly (CAVB)	2015 African Champions
(Iran) Paykan Tehran (AVC)*	2015 AVC Representatives
(Russia) Zenit Kazan (CEV)	2015 European Champions
(Puerto Rico) Capitanes de Arecibo (NORCECA)	2015 NORCECA Representatives
(Argentina) UPCN San Juan (CSV)	2015 South American Champions

* Paykan Tehran replaced Matin Varamin (2014 Asian Champions), who withdrew from the tournament.

== Pools composition ==
Pool A	Pool B
(Brazil) Sada Cruzeiro	(Argentina) UPCN San Juan
(Russia) Zenit Kazan	(Iran) Paykan Tehran
(Puerto Rico) Capitanes de Arecibo	(Egypt) Al-Ahly

== Venue ==
All matches
Betim, Brazil
Ginásio Poliesportivo Divino Braga
Capacity: 6,000
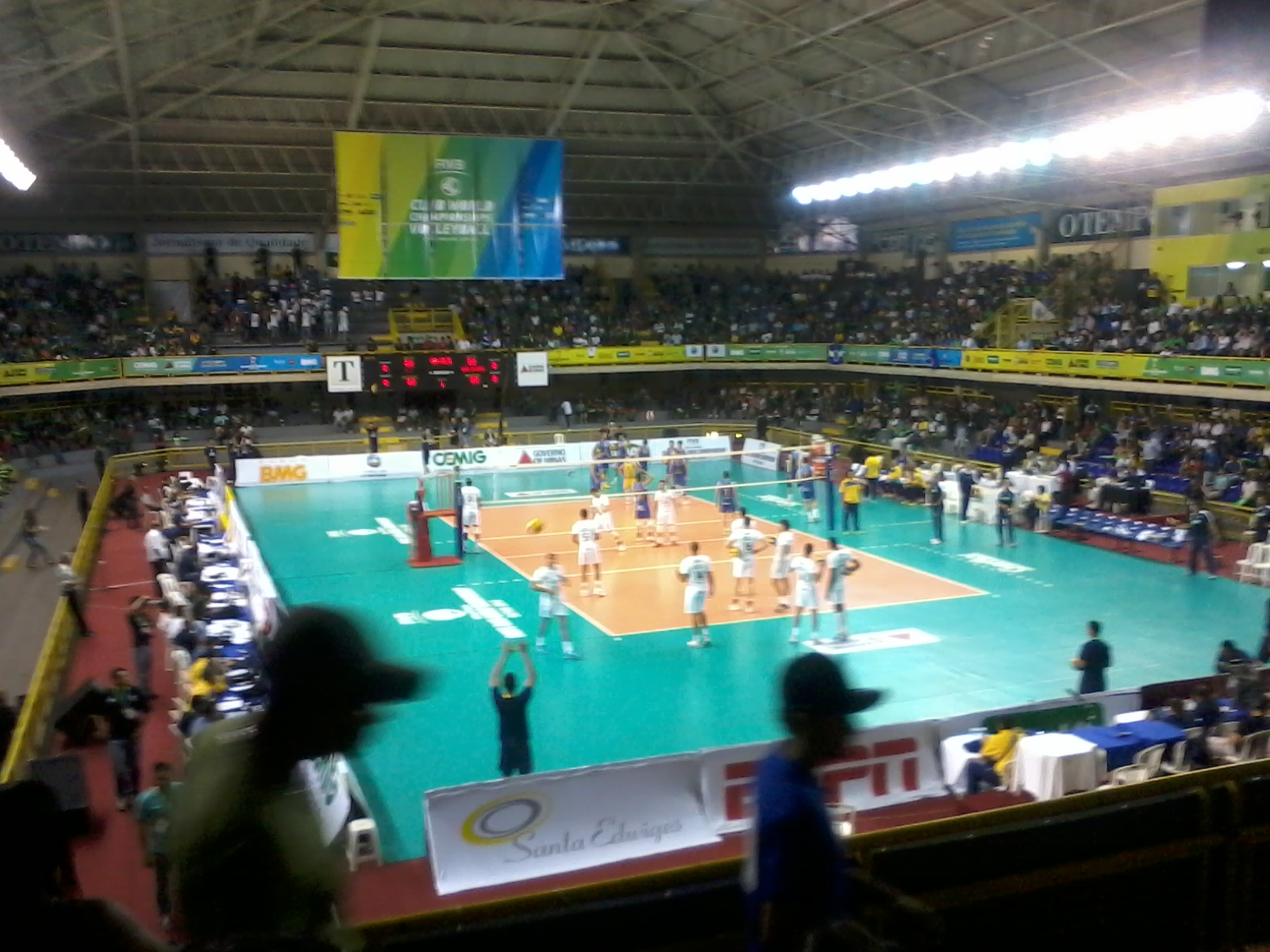

== Pool standing procedure ==
1. Number of matches won
2. Match points
3. Sets ratio
4. Points ratio
5. Result of the last match between the tied teams

Match won 3–0 or 3–1: 3 match points for the winner, 0 match points for the loser
Match won 3–2: 2 match points for the winner, 1 match point for the loser

== Preliminary round ==
- All times are Brasília Summer Time (UTC−02:00).

=== Pool A ===
Pos	Team	Pld	W	L	Pts	SW	SL	SR	SPW	SPL	SPR	Qualification
1	(Russia) Zenit Kazan	2	2	0	6	6	1	6.000	169	138	1.225	Semifinals
2	(Brazil) Sada Cruzeiro	2	1	1	3	4	3	1.333	158	145	1.090	Semifinals
3	(Puerto Rico) Capitanes de Arecibo	2	0	2	0	0	6	0.000	106	150	0.707	

Date	Time		Score		Set 1	Set 2	Set 3	Set 4	Set 5	Total	Report
27 Oct	20:10	Sada Cruzeiro (Brazil)	3–0	(Puerto Rico) Capitanes de Arecibo	25–13	25–18	25–20			75–51	P2 P3
28 Oct	20:10	Sada Cruzeiro (Brazil)	1–3	(Russia) Zenit Kazan	20–25	18–25	25–19	20–25		83–94	P2 P3
29 Oct	17:10	Zenit Kazan (Russia)	3–0	(Puerto Rico) Capitanes de Arecibo	25–19	25–20	25–16			75–55	P2 P3

=== Pool B ===
Pos	Team	Pld	W	L	Pts	SW	SL	SR	SPW	SPL	SPR	Qualification
1	(Iran) Paykan Tehran	2	2	0	6	6	0	MAX	150	120	1.250	Semifinals
2	(Argentina) UPCN San Juan	2	1	1	3	3	3	1.000	141	135	1.044	Semifinals
3	(Egypt) Al-Ahly	2	0	2	0	0	6	0.000	114	150	0.760	

Date	Time		Score		Set 1	Set 2	Set 3	Set 4	Set 5	Total	Report
27 Oct	17:10	Paykan Tehran (Iran)	3–0	(Egypt) Al-Ahly	25–19	25–20	25–15			75–54	P2 P3
28 Oct	17:30	UPCN San Juan (Argentina)	3–0	(Egypt) Al-Ahly	25–23	25–16	25–21			75–60	P2 P3
29 Oct	20:10	UPCN San Juan (Argentina)	0–3	(Iran) Paykan Tehran	22–25	22–25	22–25			66–75	P2 P3

== Final round ==
- All times are Brasília Summer Time (UTC−02:00).

Semifinals
30 October
(Iran) Paykan	0
(Brazil) Sada	3
30 October
(Russia) Kazan	3
(Argentina) UPCN	0

Final
31 October
(Brazil) Sada	3
(Russia) Kazan	1
3rd place match
31 October
(Iran) Paykan	2
(Argentina) UPCN	3

=== Semifinals ===
Date	Time		Score		Set 1	Set 2	Set 3	Set 4	Set 5	Total	Report
30 Oct	17:30	Zenit Kazan (Russia)	3–0	(Argentina) UPCN San Juan	25–23	25–21	25–20			75–64	P2 P3
30 Oct	20:00	Paykan Tehran (Iran)	0–3	(Brazil) Sada Cruzeiro	19–25	17–25	17–25			53–75	P2 P3

=== 3rd place match ===
Date	Time		Score		Set 1	Set 2	Set 3	Set 4	Set 5	Total	Report
31 Oct	11:40	Paykan Tehran (Iran)	2–3	(Argentina) UPCN San Juan	25–21	25–22	20–25	23–25	14–16	107–109	P2 P3

=== Final ===
Date	Time		Score		Set 1	Set 2	Set 3	Set 4	Set 5	Total	Report
31 Oct	15:00	Sada Cruzeiro (Brazil)	3–1	(Russia) Zenit Kazan	25–20	21–25	27–25	25–21		98–91	P2 P3

== Final standing ==
Rank	Team
1st place, gold medalist(s)	(Brazil) Sada Cruzeiro
2nd place, silver medalist(s)	(Russia) Zenit Kazan
3rd place, bronze medalist(s)	(Argentina) UPCN San Juan
4	(Iran) Paykan Tehran
5	(Egypt) Al-Ahly
5	(Puerto Rico) Capitanes de Arecibo

2015 Men's Club World Champions

2nd title

14–man roster
Alan Souza, Éder Levi Kock, Vanderson Malta, William Arjona (c), Wallace de Souza, Yoandy Leal, Rodrigo Leão, Isac Santos, Fernando Kreling, Fred Winters, Éder Carbonera, Sérgio Nogueira, Filipe Ferraz, Carlos Eduardo Silva
Head coach
Marcelo Méndez

== Awards ==
- Most valuable player
  (Cuba) Yoandy Leal (Sada Cruzeiro)
- Best setter
  (Brazil) William Arjona (Sada Cruzeiro)
- Best outside spikers
  (Cuba) Wilfredo León (Zenit Kazan)
  (Bulgaria) Todor Aleksiev (UPCN San Juan)
- Best middle blockers
  (Bulgaria) Nikolay Nikolov (Paykan Tehran)
  (Russia) Alexander Gutsalyuk (Zenit Kazan)
- Best opposite spiker
  (Russia) Maxim Mikhaylov (Zenit Kazan)
- Best libero
  (Brazil) Sérgio Nogueira (Sada Cruzeiro)
