= Todor Aleksiev =

Bulgarian volleyball player

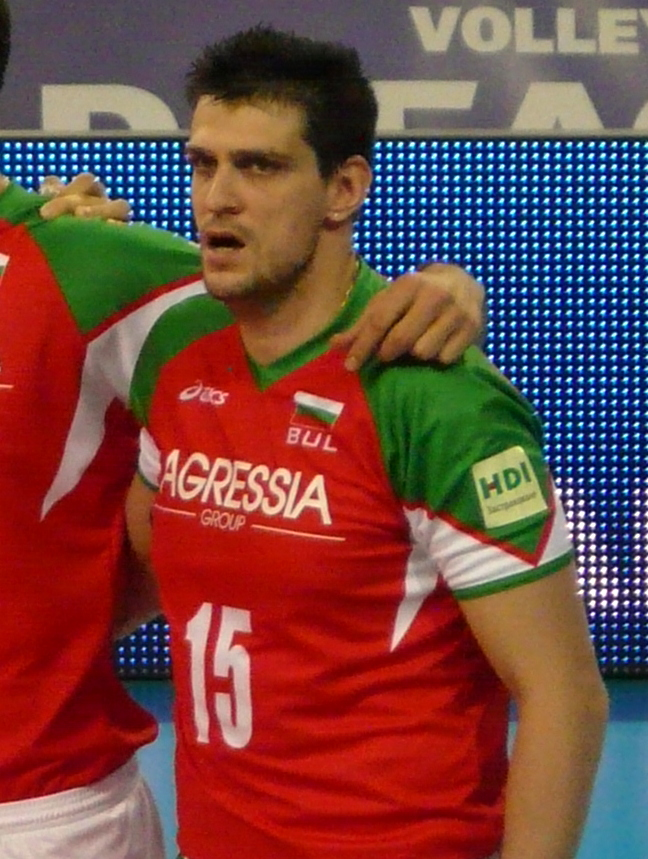

Personal information
- Nationality: Bulgarian
- Born: 21 April 1983 (age 43) Plovdiv, Bulgaria
- Height: 2.04 m (6 ft 8 in)
- Weight: 105 kg (231 lb)
- Spike: 355 cm (140 in)
- Block: 340 cm (134 in)

Volleyball information
- Position: Sports director
- Current club: Hebar Pazardzhik

Career
- Years: Team
- 2000–2004 2004–2006 2006–2007 2007–2008 2008–2009 2009–2010 2010–2011 2011 2011–2015 2015–2016 2016–2017 2017–2018 2018 2018–2019 2019–2023: Lokomotiv Рlovdiv; Levski Sofia; Ural Ufa; Volley Corigliano; Halkbank Ankara; Lokomotiv Yekaterinburg; Büyükşehir Belediyesi; Acqua Paradiso Monza; Gazprom-Ugra Surgut; UPCN San Juan; Personal Bolivar; Olympiacos Piraeus; Sporting Lisbon; Olympiacos Piraeus; Hebar Pazardzhik

National team
- Years: Team
- 2006–2017: Bulgaria
Honours
Men's volleyball
Representing Bulgaria
World Championship
| Bronze medal – third place | 2006 Japan |
World Cup
| Bronze medal – third place | 2007 Japan |
European Championship
| Bronze medal – third place | 2009 Turkey |
European Games
| Silver medal – second place | 2015 Baku | Team |
- Updated on 30 December 2017

Todor Aleksiev (Bulgarian: Тодор Алексиев; born 21 April 1983) is a Bulgarian former volleyball player who wore the No. 15 shirt in the national team which he had driven to major success in a number of competitions.

Aleksiev won bronze medals with the national team in the 2006 FIVB Volleyball Men's World Championship, 2007 FIVB Men's World Cup and 2009 Men's European Volleyball Championship. He won the "Best scorer" and the "Best receiver" award at the 2012 FIVB World League.

At club level, he plays in Bulgarian Volleyball League for Hebar Pazardzhik.

== Sporting achievements ==
=== National team ===
- 2012: 4th place at Summer Olympics, Men's indoor volleyball tournament (London)
- 2008: 5th place at Summer Olympics, Men's indoor volleyball tournament (Beijing)
- 2006 Men's World Championship (Japan)
- 2009 Men's European Championship (İzmir-Istanbul, Turkey)
- 2007 Men's World Cup (Japan)
- 2015 2015 European Games, Men's indoor volleyball tournament (Baku)
- 2003 2003 FIVB Volleyball Men's U21 World Championship (Iran)

=== Clubs ===
==== International competitions ====
- 2015 Men's Club World Championship, with UPCN San Juan
- 2017 Men's South American Club Championship, with Personal Bolivar
- 2016 Men's South American Club Championship, with UPCN San Juan
- 2018 Men's CEV Challenge Cup, with Olympiacos Piraeus

==== National championships ====
- 2004/2005 Bulgarian Championship, with Levski Sofia
- 2005/2006 Bulgarian Championship, with Levski Sofia
- 2015/2016 Argentinian Championship, with UPCN San Juan
- 2016/2017 Argentinian Championship, with Personal Bolivar
- 2017/2018 Greek Championship, with Olympiacos Piraeus
- 2018/2019 Greek Championship, with Olympiacos Piraeus

==== National trophies ====
- 2005/2006 Bulgarian Cup, with Levski Sofia
- 2017/2018 Greek League Cup, with Olympiacos Piraeus
- 2018/2019 Greek League Cup, with Olympiacos Piraeus

=== Individuals ===
- 2012 World League "Best receiver"
- 2012 World League "Best scorer"
- 2015 Club World Championship "Best outside spiker"
- 2017/18 Greek Volley League MVP
