= Martín Palisi =

Argentine footballer

Personal information
- Full name: Martín Palisi
- Date of birth: 19 January 1988 (age 38)
- Place of birth: Buenos Aires, Argentina
- Height: 1.70 m (5 ft 7 in)
- Position: Midfielder

Senior career*
Years	Team	Apps	(Gls)
2009–2015	Atlanta	154	(2)
2016	Almirante Brown	17	(1)
2016	Cúcuta Deportivo	10	(0)
2017–2018	Alvarado	20	(1)
2018–2019	Santamarina	2	(0)
2019	Ferro Carril Oeste	8	(0)
2020–2022	Comunicaciones	9	(0)
2022	Ciudad Bolívar	23	(0)
2023	Ituzaingó	1	(0)
2024	Deportivo Español		
- * Club domestic league appearances and goals as of 15:22, 8 January 2026 (UTC)

Martín Palisi (born 19 January 1988) is an Argentine professional exfootballer who played as midfielder. He is currently in charge of the Football Department of Ciudad Bolívar in the Primera B Nacional of Argentina.

== Career ==
Palisi made the move into senior football with Atlanta in 2009. After forty-seven appearances in his first two seasons in Primera B Metropolitana, he made his bow in Primera B Nacional on 16 October 2011 during a 0–4 win away to Gimnasia y Esgrima; in a season which ended with relegation back to tier three. He took his overall match tally to one hundred and fifty-eight for Atlanta in the following four campaigns. Palisi joined Almirante Brown in January 2016 for a seven-month stint, before departing for Colombia after signing for Cúcuta Deportivo. Ten appearances followed, with his last game coming against Valledupar on 10 October.

On 27 July 2017, Palisi joined Alvarado of Torneo Federal A. His debut arrived on 17 September versus Deportivo Roca, prior to the midfielder netting his first goal for the club during a win over Rivadavia in October. Palisi moved up to Primera B Nacional with Santamarina in June 2018.

== Career statistics ==
As of 26 December 2018.

Club statistics
Club	Season	League			Cup (Note: Includes the Copa Argentina and Copa Colombia)		League Cup		Continental		Other		Total	
Club	Season	Division	Apps	Goals	Apps	Goals	Apps	Goals	Apps	Goals	Apps	Goals	Apps	Goals
Atlanta	2011–12	Primera B Nacional	4	0	2	0	—		—		0	0	6	0
Atlanta	2012–13	Primera B Metropolitana	35	1	0	0	—		—		1 (Note: One appearance in the 2012–13 Primera B Metropolitana play-offs)	0	36	1
Atlanta	2013–14	Primera B Metropolitana	21	0	1	0	—		—		2 (Note: Two appearances in the 2013–14 Primera B Metropolitana play-offs)	0	24	0
Atlanta	2014	Primera B Metropolitana	11	0	0	0	—		—		0	0	11	0
Atlanta	2015	Primera B Metropolitana	36	1	3	0	—		—		1 (Note: One appearance in the 2015 Primera B Metropolitana play-offs)	0	40	1
Atlanta	Total		107	2	6	0	—		—		4	0	117	2
Almirante Brown	2016	Primera B Metropolitana	17	1	0	0	—		—		0	0	17	1
Cúcuta Deportivo	2016	Categoría Primera B	10	0	2	0	—		—		0	0	12	0
Alvarado	2017–18	Torneo Federal A	20	1	3	0	—		—		6 (Note: Six appearances in the 2017–18 Torneo Federal A play-offs)	0	29	1
Santamarina	2018–19	Primera B Nacional	2	0	0	0	—		—		0	0	2	0
Career total			156	4	11	0	—		—		10	0	177	4

== Honours ==
Atlanta

- Primera B Metropolitana: 2010–11
