= Gigantes del Sur =

Argentine volleyball club

- Nicknames: Los "Dinos"
- Sport: Volleyball
- Founded: November 2003
- League: Liga Argentina de Voleibol – Serie A1
- Based in: Neuquén, Argentina
- Arena: Estadio Ruca Che
- Head coach: Alejandro Grossi
- Website: www.gigantesdelsur.com.ar

Uniforms
- Uniform Uniform

Gigantes del Sur is a volleyball team in Neuquén, Argentina. Founded in November 2003, its home stadium is Ruca Che Stadium, Central Park Gym and currently Picún Leufú. It is a member of Liga Argentina de Voleibol – Serie A1, Argentina's top-level men's volleyball league.

== History ==
=== Creation, A2 Series and promotion (2002-2005) ===
The team was made primarily as the result of the 2002 world championships organized in Argentina. In the same year, the Neuquén province started a program called «Development Plan of Provincial volleyball». This plan resulted in the creation of the team in November 2003 and the team began to participate in national tournaments that same year.

The 2003-04 A2 League was organized by FeVA and had eight teams in its final phase, among them, the Boca Juniors and Independiente de Dolores, teams that arrived to the semifinals. The Independiente de Dolores were eliminated by the Giants, and the Giants faced Saint Lorenzo of Buenos Aires in the final game. The first two games were played in the Ruca Che Stadium, where the home team won the first game, but after losing the second game, they were at a disadvantage, and finally, the porteño (Buenos Aires) team moved up after winning two games as the home team. After finishing as runners-up, the Giants had the chance to move up based on a play-off game facing another A1 League, which were the Obras San Juan, a team that won the series and stayed in the standings.

After being the runners-up, the Giants faced their second season, the 2004-05 season, in the A2 league as the favored team to move up. The team got stronger with Diego Spinelli, Dick Montalbán, Juan Pablo Hatrick, Leonardo Figueiredo, Javier Sánchez and Javier Dantas. The "Dinos" finished second in the regular season, after the Boca Juniors, and so they had an advantage in the majority of the play-offs. In the semifinals, the team faced Instituto Carlos Pellegrini, of Tucumán, and in the final faced the Boca Juniors. From their position in the regular season, the team had adisadvantage in the pairings and so they were the visiting team. After winning the fourth game in The Bombonerita, they were promoted to the A1 League.

The promoted team was made up of Juan Pablo Hatrick, Diego Spinelli, Matías Macor, Martín Furesi, Javier Dantas, Román Aguilar, Leonardo Figueiredo, Dick Montalbán, Sebastián Ruiz, Ignacio Maffei, Alexandro Moreno, Emanuel Espinosa, Francisco Sánchez, Sebastián Espiño, Marcos Galdón and Matías Properzi. The trainer was Alejandro Grossi, the assistant was Ariel Giménez and the physical trainer was Mariano Dellavalle.

=== A1 Series, highest division (2005-2006) ===
The first season of the "Dinos" in the highest national division was 2005-06, with a team made up partly of local players of the Centenarian Sportive Association, and reinforced with players like Joelson Barbosa, Matías Macor, Alejandro Grossi and the repatriated Camilo Soto, among others like Javier Dantas. The trainer continued being Alejandro Grossi.

The season began with the Copa ACLAV 2005, where the Giants played in the Ruca Che Stadium the Club de Amigos and Origines Bolívar. In their first game in the highest division they lost in five sets to the Club de Amigos. The following week they played Alianza de Jesús María and the Club Social Morteros, and in the last week before the play-offs, they played against Vélez Sarsfield and Misiones Vóley. The Giants ended the regular season with three wins and three losses, and tied with Club Social Morteros in the following stage, which was played entirely in Rosario. After beating the Cordoban team 3 to 0, they were eliminated by Misiones Vóley in the Argentinian north 3 to 1, and this finished their first participation in the Copa ACLAV.

Later, in the league's regular season, the Giants had ten wins and twelve losses, which put them in ninth place, and saved them from falling in the rankings, but they were unable to enter the play-offs.

=== Runners-up and international participation (2006-2007) ===
The team's second season in the highest division was better than the previous one: the team finished second in the league's regular season with seventeen wins and five losses, which gave them the home team advantage in all the brackets, except that it put them against the first place team DirecTV Bolívar, who were undefeated. After winning, first to La Union de Formosa and later to the Boca Juniors, both played in four games, they faced the undefeated DirecTV Bolívar in the final, who had played twenty-eight games without losing. In the final it was logical that the team from Buenos Aires won in four games against the Patagonian team.

Being the runners-up qualified the team for the Copa Mercosur of 2007, which occurred in October 2007 in Port Iguazú, Misiones, and DirecTV Bolívar was there as well. The Patagonian team was made up players from the B Zone together with La Union de Formosa and the Brazilian teams Caxias do Sul and Barao Blumenau. After winning the game and the corresponding semifinal, they faced DirecTV Bolívar in the final, where the Giants took second place again.

=== Transitional seasons (2007-2014) ===
In their third season in the highest division, the Giants started as one of the main teams to dethrone DirecTV Bolívar, with the foundation of the team made up of Martín Hernández, Leo Patti, Camilo Soto, and Javier Sánchez as some of the outstanding players. During the regular season the team had seventeen wins and five losses, which placed them third in the league. After winning against Belgrano of Córdoba in five games by the quarter-finals, the Giants were eliminated by Chubut Volley in the semifinals playing as the home team in the Gymnasium Central Park, in Neuquén.

The foundation of the team was the same from 3 seasons ago, with Camilo Soto as the guard, Martín Hernández as the opposite, Matias Macor and Javier "Monkey" Sánchez as the centers, and the captain and symbol of the team Leonardo Patti as the receiver- striker. Gonzalo Campaña (líbero/defensive specialist) and Rodrigo Villalba (striker-receiver), that completed the six-man team, changed teams and Sebastián Garrocq and Estevan Cabrera Aranda took their places. Completing the team were Valentín Rolandelli, Emmanuel Espinoza, Mauro Velazques, Javier Santos, Javier Dantas and Héctor "Tito" Vergara. The trainer continued to be Alejandro Grossi.

The foundation of the team was the same from 3 seasons ago, with Camilo Soto as the guard, Martín Hernández as the opposite, Matias Macor and Javier "Monkey" Sánchez as the centers, and the captain and symbol of the team Leonardo Patti as the receiver- striker. Gonzalo Campaña (líbero/defensive specialist) and Rodrigo Villalba (striker-receiver), that completed the six-man team, changed teams and Sebastián Garrocq and Estevan Cabrera Aranda took their places. Completing the team were Valentín Rolandelli, Emmanuel Espinoza, Mauro Velazques, Javier Santos, Javier Dantas and Héctor "Tito" Vergara. The trainer continued to be Alejandro Grossi.

This time around, the team changed their hometown to Picún Leufú, to the "Jorge Aguila" stadium. The regular season began with a clash against Chubut Volley, something that has already become a Patagonian classic. In addition, the team based in Trelew became the runners-up in the past league, whereas the "Dinos" were runners-up of the Copa ACLAV. After a win as the visiting team, the team lost to Drean Bolívar and later to La Union de Formosa, but afterwards had three consecutive wins and a later defeat, showing the irregularity of the team. In spite of this, they finished fourth in the regular season with fourteen wins and six losses, and tied in the play-offs with Chubut Volley, a replay of the classic. Chubut counted on their experienced players, like Jeronimo Bidegain, Nico López, Francisco Russo and Pinha. The two starting teams played in Picún Leufú, playing live throughout the country: the neuqinos lost the first game 3-2, and won the second game with the same score. In Chubut they also tied 1-1 (a win by proclamation) and the fifth game was contested in Picún, and leaned in favor of the Giants, again by 3-2. After winning against the Chubutense team in five games, they lost to Drean Bolívar, a team that later would become champion, in the semifinals and after four games. In the 2010-11 season the team readied themselves to fight to stay in the division with their captain, Camilo Soto, as their guide. Javier Dantas, a reference point on and off the court, and several young neuquinos players stood out to Franco Retamozo, the head of the lower selections in the Neuquén province, who once had a career in the River Plate of Buenos Aires. The team was made up of a majority of young born players in the heart of the Neuquén Voley project. The team met their goal of not dropping to the next division, but they did not qualify for the playoffs. With 6 wins and 16 losses, they finished ninth, with a small difference of moving down four points.

In the 2011-12 season, the team had the same goal, which was to avoid dropping down to the next division. With the same number of wins as in the previous season, the Giants finished tenth, with only a one-point advantage over Lechuzas of Villa María. In the following season the team stopped dropping down in the division, and went back to play in the playoff series. They finished the regular season as the last qualifying team, in eighth place, with 9 wins and 18 losses. Therefore, they had to face the leading team, the Buenos Aires Unidos for the quarter-finals. The game ended in a predictable way, with the orange team winning the three games 3-0, 3-1 and 3-1.

The 2013-14 league placed the team in a low position again, and as the last qualifying team, they faced the best team of the season and were eliminated in three games. In the following season the team improved, placing in sixth but without moving on to the quarter-finals.

=== Present situation ===
The team began the 2015-16 season participating in the Copa ACLAV, where they were eliminated in the first phase, by Obras de San Juan and UPCN Vóley in a triangular game played in those teams' stadiums. Later, in the regular season, after having facing other rivals in at least one game, the team made the qualifiers in an erratic tournament. After defeating Pilar Vóley and La Union de Formosa, the Giants were proclaimed the champions.

Later in the season, after not playing for the title in the quarter-finals to Personal Bolívar, they fought for the Argentinian Cup. They went to the second phase of the Cup, where they were the home team in a triangular game together with Ciudad Vóley and Alliance Jesús María. They were the first of the group to win two matches and qualified for the final against UNTreF Vóley, a team that in the regular season were underneath of the "Dinos", and thus the fight for Cup would be decided in the Ruca Che. On March 26 they played in the final until the fifth set, and where the visiting team were proclaimed the champions.

== Stadiums ==
=== Ruca Che Stadium ===
The team has used the Ruca Che Stadium for its seasons in the A1 League several times. Among the main games played there, the final of the A1 League in the 2006-07 season stands out, where the Giants were the runners-up.

== Facts about the team ==
In national tournaments

Seasons in first division: 11 (2005-06 - actuality)

- Best position in the league: runners-up (2006-07)
- Worst position in the league: 10.° (2011-12)
- Seasons in second division: 2 (2004-04 and 2004-05)
  - Best position in the league: Champions (2004-05)
  - Worst position in the league: Runners-up (2003-04)
- Participation in Copa ACLAV: all (2005-06 - current)
  - Best position: runners-up (2008)
    In international tournaments Copar Mercosur
    1 (2007)
    - Best position: runners-up

== Team and Leadership ==
=== Leadership ===
- Trainer: Camilo Soto.ARG
- Assistant: Narciso Hipólito Chandía.ARG
- Assistant: Valentín Rolandelli.ARG
- Manager: Rodrigo Guerrero.ARG

== Players ==
=== Members of the A2 Team ===
- Martín Furesi
- Matías Macor (líbero)
- Javier Dantas
- Diego Spinelli, captain of the promotion

=== Runners-up Team 2006-07 ===
- Camilo Soto
- Enrique Laneri Nievas
- Javier Soldi
- Martín Hernández
- Leonardo Patti
- Javier Sánchez
- Gonzalo Campaign
- Martín Mohr
- Juan Pablo Hatrick

=== List of wins ===
Champion A2 League 2004-05
