= Pablo Peralta =

Argentine volleyball player (born 1979)

Personal information
- Nationality: Argentine
- Born: 9 December 1979 (age 46)
- Height: 2.04 m (6 ft 8 in)
- Weight: 100 kg (220 lb)
- Spike: 350 cm (140 in)
- Block: 330 cm (130 in)

Volleyball information
- Number: 12

Career
- Years: Team
- 2004: (Spain) Tenerife

National team
- Years: Team
- 2004: Argentina

Pablo Peralta (born 9 December 1979) is an Argentine male volleyball player. His position is Middle Blocker. He was part of the Argentina men's national volleyball team. He competed with the national team at the 2004 Summer Olympics in Athens, Greece. He played with Tenerife in 2004.

== Clubs ==
- (Argentina) Rojas Scholem (2001/2002)
- (Spain) Tenerife (2004)
- (Argentina) Club Ciudad de Bolívar (2006/2007)
- (Argentina) UPCN Vóley Club (2007/2008)
- (Italy) Isernia Volley (2008/2009)
- (Argentina) Puerto San Martin Voley (2013/2014)
- (Argentina) Club Rosario (2017-Current)

== See also ==
- Argentina at the 2004 Summer Olympics
