= William Arjona =

Brazilian volleyball player

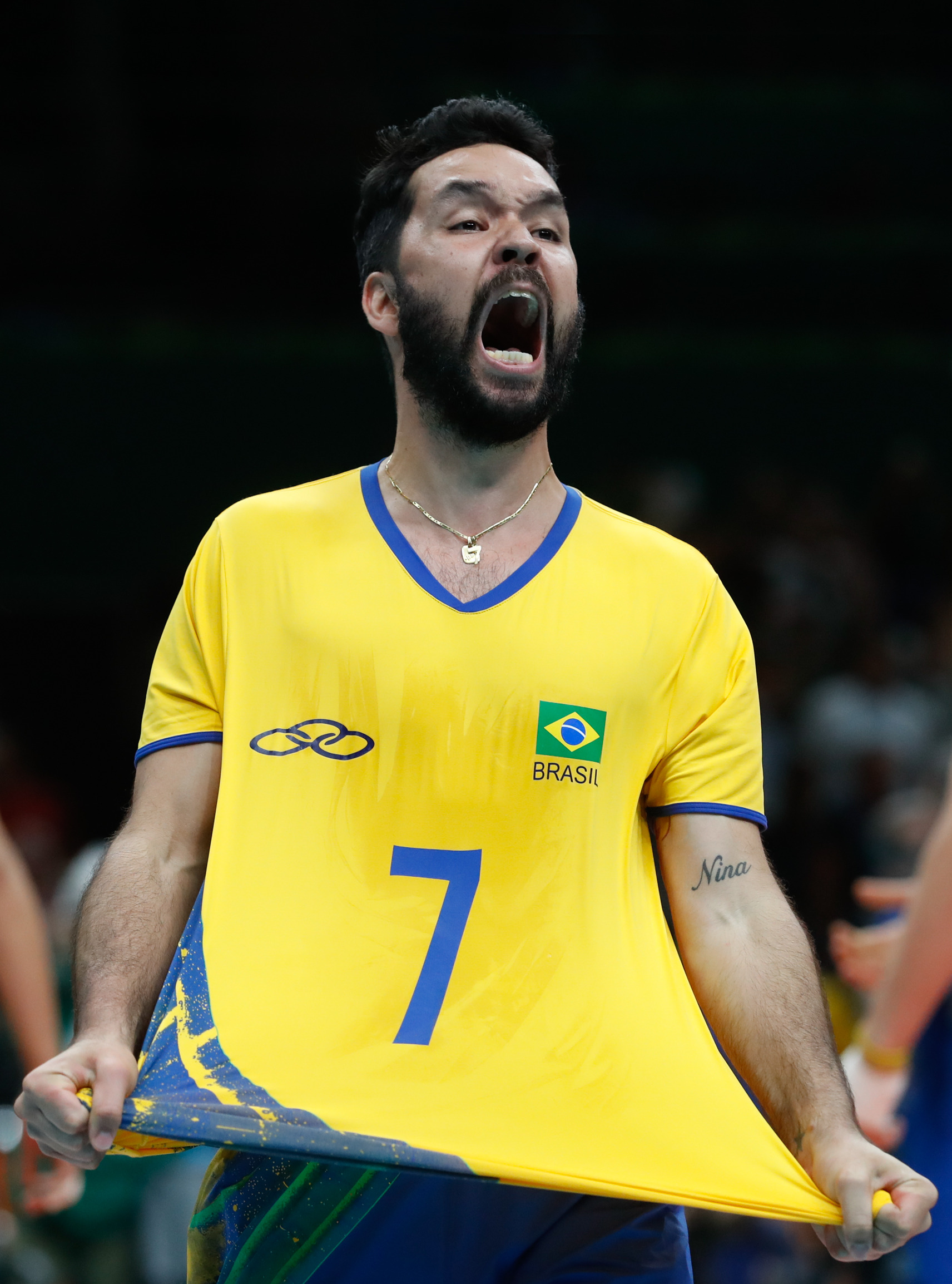
- Arjona at the 2016 Olympics

Personal information
- Full name: William Peixoto Arjona
- Nickname: El Mago
- Born: 31 July 1979 (age 47) São Paulo, Brazil
- Height: 1.86 m (6 ft 1 in)
- Weight: 78 kg (172 lb)
- Spike: 300 cm (118 in)
- Block: 295 cm (116 in)

Volleyball information
- Position: Setter

Career
- Years: Team
- 1996–1997: ECUS/Suzano
- 1997–2000: Três Corações
- 2000–2001: Vasco da Gama/Três Corações
- 2001–2002: ECUS/Suzano
- 2002–2004: Intelbrás/São José
- 2004–2005: Bento Vôlei
- 2005–2006: On Line/São Leopoldo
- 2006–2010: Drean Bolívar
- 2010–2017: Sada Cruzeiro
- 2017–2020: SESI São Paulo
- 2020–2023: Minas

National team
- Years: Team
- 2013–2018: Brazil
Honours
Men's volleyball
Representing Brazil
Olympic Games
Gold medal – first place	2016 Rio de Janeiro	Team
World Championship
Silver medal – second place	2018 Italy-Bulgaria	Team
World League
Silver medal – second place	2013 Mar del Plata	Team
Silver medal – second place	2016 Kraków	Team
South American Championship
Gold medal – first place	2013 Cabo Frio
- Updated on 6 October 2019

William Arjona (born 31 July 1979) is a Brazilian former volleyball player, member of Brazil men's national volleyball team that won the 2016 Olympic gold medal in Rio de Janeiro.

Arjona was called up for the senior national team for the first time in 2003. He played four years in Bolívar, where he conquered the national championship four times and was chosen as the best player in the country. He came back in Brazil in 2010 to play for Sada Cruzeiro, where he won the 2012 Superliga as the best setter in the competition. In 2013, he was called and took part in Brazil World League silver medal campaign and won the gold medal in the South American Championship.

== Sporting achievements ==
=== Clubs ===
==== FIVB Club World Championship ====
- 2012 – with Sada Cruzeiro
- 2013 – with Sada Cruzeiro
- 2015 – with Sada Cruzeiro
- 2016 – with Sada Cruzeiro

==== South American Club Championship ====
- 2010 – with Drean Bolívar
- 2012 – with Sada Cruzeiro
- 2014 – with Sada Cruzeiro
- 2015 – with Sada Cruzeiro
- 2016 – with Sada Cruzeiro
- 2017 – with Sada Cruzeiro

==== National Championship ====
- 1996/1997 Brazilian Superliga, with ECUS/Suzano
- 2006/2007 Argentinian Liga, with Drean Bolívar
- 2007/2008 Argentinian Liga, with Drean Bolívar
- 2008/2009 Argentinian Liga, with Drean Bolívar
- 2009/2010 Argentinian Liga, with Drean Bolívar
- 2011/2012 Brazilian Superliga, with Sada Cruzeiro
- 2013/2014 Brazilian Superliga, with Sada Cruzeiro
- 2014/2015 Brazilian Superliga, with Sada Cruzeiro
- 2015/2016 Brazilian Superliga, with Sada Cruzeiro
- 2016/2017 Brazilian Superliga, with Sada Cruzeiro

=== National team ===
- 2013 FIVB World League
- 2013 South American Championship
- 2016 FIVB World League
- 2016 Olympic Games
- 2018 FIVB World Championship

=== Individual ===
- 1997 FIVB U19 World Championship – Best Setter
- 1998 U21 South American Championship – Best Setter
- 2004/05 Brazilian Superliga – Best Setter
- 2006/07 Liga Argentina – Most Valuable Player
- 2006/07 Liga Argentina – Best Setter
- 2007/08 Liga Argentina – Most Valuable Player
- 2007/08 Liga Argentina – Best Setter
- 2008/09 Liga Argentina – Best Setter
- 2009/10 Liga Argentina – Best Setter
- 2010/11 Brazilian Superliga – Best Setter
- 2011/12 Brazilian Superliga - Best Setter
- 2012 South American Club Championship - Best Setter
- 2012/13 Brazilian Superliga - Best Setter
- 2012 FIVB Club World Championship - Best Setter
- 2013 FIVB Club World Championship - Best Setter
- 2013/14 Brazilian Superliga - Best Setter
- 2014/15 Brazilian Superliga - Best Setter
- 2015 FIVB Club World Championship - Best Setter
- 2015/16 Brazilian Superliga - Best Setter
- 2016 South American Club Championship - Best Setter
- 2016 FIVB Club World Championship - Most Valuable Player
- 2017 South American Club Championship - Best Setter
- 2016/17 Brazilian Superliga - Best Setter
- 2017/18 Brazilian Superliga – Best Setter
- 2018/19 Brazilian Superliga – Best Setter

Awards
Preceded by (Brazil) Raphael Oliveira	Best Setter of FIVB Club World Championship; 2012; 2013; 2015	Succeeded by (Italy) Simone Giannelli
Preceded by (Cuba) Yoandry Leal	Most Valuable Player of FIVB Club World Championship; 2016	Succeeded by (Italy) Osmany Juantorena
