= Maximiliano Cavallotti =

Argentine professional footballer

Personal information
- Full name: Maximiliano Cavallotti
- Date of birth: 15 November 1984 (age 41)
- Place of birth: Santa Teresa, Argentina
- Height: 1.87 m (6 ft 1 1/2 in)
- Position: Goalkeeper

Youth career
- Newell's Old Boys

Senior career*
Years	Team	Apps	(Gls)
2007–2017	Gimnasia y Esgrima	127	(2)
2017–2018	Argentinos Juniors	2	(0)
2018–2020	Central Córdoba	10	(0)
2021	Ayacucho FC	13	(0)
2022-2024	Club Ciudad de Bolívar	99	(0)
- * Club domestic league appearances and goals as of 15:20, 8 January 2026 (UTC)

Maximiliano Cavallotti (born 15 November 1984) is an Argentine retired professional goalkeeper. He is currently in charge of the Football Department of Ciudad Bolívar in the Primera B Nacional of Argentina.

== Career ==
Cavallotti spent time in the youth academy of Newell's Old Boys up until 2007, prior to joining Argentine Primera División team Gimnasia y Esgrima in the same year. He made his professional debut for Gimnasia in the 2009–10 season and went on to play over one hundred times in ten years for the club. During his time with Gimnasia, Cavallotti scored two goals. The first came in March 2015 as he scored a 91st-minute consolation in a 2–3 defeat to Atlético Paraná, before converting a penalty three months later in a 3–2 win over Chacarita Juniors. In August 2017, Cavallotti left Gimnasia and joined Primera División side Argentinos Juniors.

He made his top-flight debut on 9 September against Patronato. Central Córdoba of Primera B Nacional signed Cavallotti in July 2018.

== Career statistics ==
As of 8 September 2018.

Club statistics
Club	Season	League			Cup (Note: Includes the Copa Argentina)		League Cup		Continental		Other		Total	
Club	Season	Division	Apps	Goals	Apps	Goals	Apps	Goals	Apps	Goals	Apps	Goals	Apps	Goals
Gimnasia y Esgrima	2007–08	Primera División	0	0	0	0	—		—		0	0	0	0
Gimnasia y Esgrima	2008–09	Primera División	0	0	0	0	—		—		0	0	0	0
Gimnasia y Esgrima	2009–10	Primera B Nacional	1	0	0	0	—		—		0	0	1	0
Gimnasia y Esgrima	2010–11	Primera B Nacional	0	0	0	0	—		—		0	0	0	0
Gimnasia y Esgrima	2011–12	Primera B Nacional	21	0	1	0	—		—		0	0	22	0
Gimnasia y Esgrima	2012–13	Primera B Nacional	0	0	0	0	—		—		0	0	0	0
Gimnasia y Esgrima	2013–14	Primera B Nacional	3	0	1	0	—		—		0	0	4	0
Gimnasia y Esgrima	2014	Primera B Nacional	3	0	0	0	—		—		0	0	3	0
Gimnasia y Esgrima	2015	Primera B Nacional	30	2	1	0	—		—		0	0	31	2
Gimnasia y Esgrima	2016	Primera B Nacional	18	0	1	0	—		—		0	0	19	0
Gimnasia y Esgrima	2016–17	Primera B Nacional	44	0	0	0	—		—		0	0	44	0
Gimnasia y Esgrima	Total		120	2	4	0	—		—		0	0	124	2
Argentinos Juniors	2017–18	Primera División	2	0	0	0	—		—		0	0	2	0
Central Córdoba	2018–19	Primera B Nacional	0	0	0	0	—		—		0	0	0	0
Career total			122	2	4	0	—		—		0	0	126	2
