= Bolívar Partido =

Bolívar Partido de Bolívar
- Department
- Location of Bolívar Partido in Buenos Aires Province
- Coordinates: 36°14′S 61°07′W
- Country: Argentina
- Established: March 2, 1938
- Seat: San Carlos de Bolívar

Government
  - Intendant: Marcos Pisano (PJ)

Area
  - Total: 5,027 km^{2} (1,941 sq mi)

Population
  - Total: 32,442
  - Density: 6.454/km^{2} (16.71/sq mi)
- Demonym: bolivarense
- Postal Code: B6550
- IFAM: BUE015
- Area Code: 02314
- Website: bolivar.gob.ar

Bolívar Partido is a partido (second level administrative subdivision) located in central Buenos Aires Province, Argentina.

The partido has 5,027 km² (1,941 sq mi) and a population of 32,442 (2001 census [INDEC]), and its capital is San Carlos de Bolívar.

== Settlements ==
- San Carlos de Bolívar
- Hale
- Juan F. Ibarra
- Mariano Unzué
- Paula (Est. La Paula)
- Pirovano
- Villa Lynch Pueyrredón
- Vallimanca
- Urdampilleta
- Santander, origen España
