= Nahuel Yeri =

Argentine footballer

Personal information
- Full name: Nahuel Mariano Yeri
- Date of birth: 12 September 1991 (age 35)
- Place of birth: Mar del Plata, Argentina
- Height: 1.74 m (5 ft 8 1/2 in)
- Position: Midfielder

Team information
- Current team: Ciudad de Bolívar

Youth career
- 2006–2010: Banfield

Senior career*
| Years | Team | Apps | (Gls) |
| 2010–2016 | Banfield | 103 | (5) |
| 2011–2012 | → Deportivo Merlo (loan) | 30 | (0) |
| 2016–2022 | Aldosivi | 73 | (2) |
| 2022– | Ciudad de Bolívar | 104 | (14) |
- * Club domestic league appearances and goals as of 16:50, 25 April 2026 (UTC)

Nahuel Mariano Yeri (born 12 September 1991) is an Argentine professional footballer who plays as a midfielder for Ciudad de Bolívar in the Primera Nacional of Argentina.

== Career ==
Yeri's senior career began in 2010 with Primera División side Banfield. On 7 February, in the 2009–10 season, Yeri made his Banfield debut in a 2–1 defeat against Chacarita Juniors. Three months later he made his second appearance for Banfield, versus Huracán. In 2010–11, the following season, he again made two appearances. For 2011–12, Yeri didn't make an appearance for Banfield as he was loaned out to Primera B Nacional club Deportivo Merlo. Twenty-seven appearances followed before he returned to Banfield, who were relegated to the division Yeri had just played in.

In Argentina's second tier, Yeri made sixteen appearances and scored three goals, but it wasn't enough as Banfield missed out on promotion by eight points. Yeri featured heavily in the following season, 2013–14, as he made thirty-six appearances in Banfield's promotion-winning campaign as they won the Primera B Nacional title. One goal in forty-one games came in the next three seasons for Yeri in the top-flight before he left Banfield as he joined fellow Primera División team Aldosivi in 2016. His first match for the club came on 30 August versus Colón. He played seventeen times in his debut season as Aldosivi suffered relegation.

For the 2022 season, he became a player for Ciudad Bolívar, where he arrived after playing in Aldosivi.

== Career statistics ==
As of 21 May 2018.

Club statistics
| Club | Season | League | | | Cup (Note: Includes the Copa Argentina) | | League Cup | | Continental (Note: Includes the Copa Libertadores and Copa Sudamericana) | | Other | | Total | |
| Club | Season | Division | Apps | Goals | Apps | Goals | Apps | Goals | Apps | Goals | Apps | Goals | Apps | Goals |
|---|---|---|---|---|---|---|---|---|---|---|---|---|---|---|
| Banfield | 2009–10 | Primera División | 2 | 0 | 0 | 0 | — | | 0 | 0 | 0 | 0 | 2 | 0 |
| Banfield | 2010–11 | Primera División | 2 | 0 | 0 | 0 | — | | 0 | 0 | 0 | 0 | 2 | 0 |
| Banfield | 2011–12 | Primera División | 0 | 0 | 0 | 0 | — | | — | | 0 | 0 | 0 | 0 |
| Banfield | 2012–13 | Primera B Nacional | 16 | 3 | 3 | 0 | — | | — | | 0 | 0 | 19 | 3 |
| Banfield | 2013–14 | Primera B Nacional | 36 | 1 | 2 | 0 | — | | — | | 0 | 0 | 38 | 1 |
| Banfield | 2014 | Primera División | 12 | 1 | 1 | 0 | — | | — | | 0 | 0 | 13 | 1 |
| Banfield | 2015 | Primera División | 23 | 0 | 0 | 0 | — | | — | | 0 | 0 | 23 | 0 |
| Banfield | 2016 | Primera División | 6 | 0 | 0 | 0 | — | | — | | 0 | 0 | 6 | 0 |
| Banfield | Total | | 97 | 5 | 6 | 0 | — | | 0 | 0 | 0 | 0 | 103 | 5 |
| Deportivo Merlo (loan) | 2011–12 | Primera B Nacional | 27 | 0 | 3 | 0 | — | | — | | 0 | 0 | 30 | 0 |
| Aldosivi | 2016–17 | Primera División | 17 | 0 | 1 | 0 | — | | — | | 0 | 0 | 18 | 0 |
| Aldosivi | 2017–18 | Primera B Nacional | 20 | 2 | 1 | 0 | — | | — | | 1 (Note: One appearance in 2017–18 Primera B Nacional play-offs) | 0 | 22 | 2 |
| Aldosivi | Total | | 37 | 2 | 2 | 0 | — | | — | | 1 | 0 | 40 | 2 |
| Career total | | | 161 | 7 | 11 | 0 | — | | 0 | 0 | 1 | 0 | 173 | 7 |

== Honours ==
Banfield

- Primera B Nacional: 2013–14

Aldosivi

- Primera B Nacional: 2017–18

Ciudad Bolívar

- Torneo Federal A : 2025
