= Leonardo Patti =

Argentine volleyball player (born 1978)

Personal information
- Nationality: Argentine
- Born: 6 July 1978 (age 48)
- Height: 1.88 m (6 ft 2 in)
- Weight: 88 kg (194 lb)
- Spike: 340 cm (130 in)
- Block: 320 cm (130 in)

Volleyball information
- Number: 3

Career
Years	Teams
2004	(Argentina) Club Ciudad de Bolívar

National team
2004	Argentina

Leonardo Patti (born 6 July 1978) is a former Argentine male volleyball player. He was part of the Argentina men's national volleyball team. He competed with the national team at the 2004 Summer Olympics in Athens, Greece. He played with Club Ciudad de Bolívar in 2004.

== Clubs ==
- (Argentina) Club Ciudad de Bolívar (2004)

== See also ==
- Argentina at the 2004 Summer Olympics
