= Alexis Diaz =

Alexis Díaz may refer to:

- Alexis Díaz (boxer) (born 1987), Venezuelan minimumweight boxer
- Alex Diaz (outfielder) (born 1968), American former baseball player
- Alexis Díaz (baseball) (born 1996), Puerto Rican professional baseball pitcher

== See also ==
- Alex Díaz (disambiguation)
- Alexis Díaz de Villegas, actor in Juan of the Dead
- Alexis Dias, Portuguese guitarist from the band Fingertips
