= Gabriel Arroyo =

Argentine volleyball player (born 1977)

Personal information
- Born: 3 March 1977 (age 48) Buenos Aires, Argentina

Sport
- Sport: Volleyball

Gabriel Arroyo (born 3 March 1977) is an Argentine volleyball player. He competed in the men's tournament at the 2012 Summer Olympics.
