= Pablo Meana =

Argentine volleyball player (born 1975)

Pablo Meana (born June 10, 1975, in Necochea) is a male volleyball player from Argentina, who played as a libero. He ended up in sixth place with the Men's National Team at the 2002 FIVB Men's World Championship, where he was named Best Receiver of the tournament. Meana is a two-time Olympian (2000 and 2004) for his native country.

== Awards ==
=== Individuals ===
- 2002 FIVB World Championship "Best Receiver"
