= Ezequiel Navarro =

Argentine footballer

Personal information
- Full name: Santiago Ezequiel Navarro
- Date of birth: 6 July 2001 (age 25)
- Place of birth: Ciudad Evita, Argentina
- Height: 1.76 m (5 ft 9 in)
- Position: Centre-back

Team information
- Current team: Club Ciudad de Bolívar

Youth career
- Huracán

Senior career*
Years	Team	Apps	(Gls)
2020–2024	Huracán	8	(0)
2022–2023	→ Temperley (loan)	15	(1)
2024–2025	→ Germinal (loan)	28	(1)
2025–	Club Ciudad de Bolívar	28	(1)
- * Club domestic league appearances and goals as of 16:07, 06 January 2026 (UTC)

Santiago Ezequiel Navarro (born 6 July 2001) is an Argentine professional footballer who plays as a centre-back for Club Ciudad de Bolívar in the Primera Nacional of Argentina.

== Club career ==
On 24 July 2019, Navarro signed his first professional contract with Huracán. Navarro made his professional debut with Huracán in a 2-0 Argentine Primera División loss to Aldosivi on 15 February 2020. On 2 June 2022, Navarro joined Temperley on loan until the end of 2023.

For the 2025 season, he became a player for Ciudad Bolívar, where he arrived after playing the last year in Germinal.

== Honours ==
Ciudad Bolívar

- Torneo Federal A : 2025
