= Alex Díaz (footballer, born 1999) =

Argentine footballer

Personal information
- Full name: Alex Rubén Díaz Borda
- Date of birth: 14 July 1999 (age 27)
- Place of birth: Neuquén, Argentina
- Height: 1.79 m (5 ft 10 in)
- Position: Midfielder

Team information
- Current team: Ciudad de Bolívar

Youth career
- Centenario

Senior career*
Years	Team	Apps	(Gls)
2017	Atlético Pacífico	16	(5)
2018	Centenario	–	(–)
2018–2019	Sol de Mayo	17	(1)
2019	Deportes Iquique	0	(0)
2020–2021	San Luis	15	(1)
2022	Deportes Limache	1	(0)
2022	Sol de Mayo	19	(1)
2023–2024	Cipolletti	51	(6)
2025	Unión San Felipe	3	(0)
2025–	Ciudad de Bolívar	22	(3)
- * Club domestic league appearances and goals as of 16:45, 25 April 2026 (UTC)

Alex Rubén Díaz Borda (born 14 July 1999) is an Argentine professional footballer who plays as a midfielder for Ciudad de Bolívar.

== Club career ==
Born in Neuquén, Argentina, Díaz was trained at Centenario and started his career with Atlético Pacífico in 2017.

After a stint with Sol de Mayo in 2018–19, Díaz moved to Chile and signed with Deportes Iquique in June 2019. Next, he played for San Luis de Quillota and Deportes Limache in that country.

Back to Argentina, Díaz rejoined Sol de Mayo in June 2022. The next two years, he played for Cipolletti.

In December 2024, Díaz returned to Chile and joined Unión San Felipe. In the second half of 2025, he returned to Argentina with Ciudad de Bolívar.

== Personal life ==
Díaz is of Chilean descent.

Díaz is nicknamed Pope.
