= Alexis González (volleyball) =

Argentine volleyball player (born 1981)

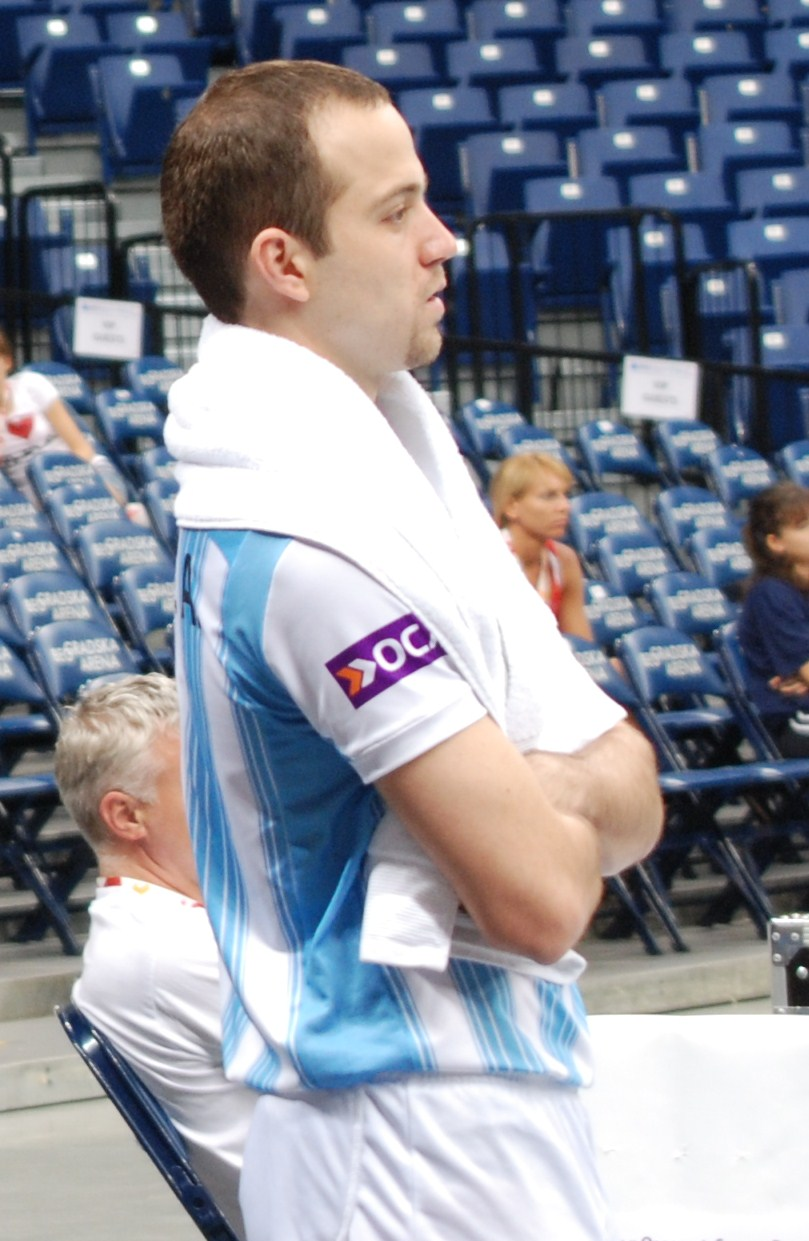

Personal information
- Full name: Alexis Rubén González
- Born: 21 July 1981 (age 45); Buenos Aires, Argentina
- Height: 1.84 m (6 ft 0 in)
- Weight: 83 kg (183 lb)
- Spike: 321 cm (126 in)
- Block: 300 cm (118 in)

Volleyball information
- Position: Libero
- Number: 16

Career
Years	Teams
2012	(Argentina) Club Ciudad de Bolívar

National team
2012	Argentina

Alexis Rubén González (born 21 July 1981) is an Argentine male volleyball player. He was part of the Argentina men's national volleyball team. He competed with the national team at the 2012 Summer Olympics in London, Great Britain. He played with Club Ciudad de Bolívar in 2012.

== Clubs ==
- (Argentina) Club Ciudad de Bolívar (2012)

== See also ==
- Argentina at the 2012 Summer Olympics
