= Maximiliano Chirivino =

Argentine volleyball player (born 1989)

Personal information
- Nationality: Argentine
- Born: 12 November 1989 (age 36); Los Polvorines, Provincia de Buenos Aires
- Height: 178 cm (5 ft 10 in)
- Weight: 77 kg (170 lb)
- Spike: 305 cm (120 in)
- Block: 288 cm (113 in)

Volleyball information
- Position: Setter
- Current club: River Plate
- Number: 7

Career
Years	Teams
2015-2017; 2017-	Club Ciudad de Bolívar; Lomas Vóley

National team
2015	Argentina

Maximiliano Chirivino (born 11 December 1989) is an Argentine male volleyball player. He is part of the Argentina men's national volleyball team. As of 2017, at club level he plays for Lomas Vóley.
