= Liga de Voleibol Argentina =

Argentine men's professional volleyball division

- Sport: Volleyball
- Founded: 1996
- First season: 1996–97
- No. of teams: 10
- Country: Argentina
- Most recent champions: Ciudad Vóley (3rd title) (2024–25)
- Most titles: UPCN Vóley Club (9 titles)
- Broadcaster: Fox Sports
- Related competitions: Copa ACLAV; Supercopa ACLAV
- Website: aclav.com

The Liga de Voleibol Argentina (in English: Argentine Volleyball League), officially known as Liga de Voleibol Argentina - Río Uruguay Seguros (LVA-RUS) for sponsorship reasons, is the top level of the Argentine men's professional volleyball league system. It is organized by the Asociación de Clubes Liga Argentina de Voleibol (abbreviated to ACLAV). The LVA has promotion and relegation with the Liga Nacional FeVA, the league immediately below.

The league was founded in 1996 under the name Liga Argentina de Clubes (in English: Argentine League of Clubs), and was organized by the Federación Argentina de Voleibol (Argentine Volleyball Federation). 12 teams participated in the first season of the league (the 1996–97), 7 from Buenos Aires (Vélez Sársfield, River Plate, Club de Amigos, Boca Juniors, G.E.B.A., Club Italiano, and Náutico Hacoaj) and 5 from the rest of the country (Mendoza de Regatas, Obras de San Juan, Unión Casildense, Luz y Fuerza de Necochea, and Peñarol de Mar del Plata). Peñarol won the first season, defeating Boca Juniors in the final. However, the club's players were unable to secure their unpaid salaries until 8 years later, when they did so through the judicial process.

Overall, Club Ciudad de Bolívar has been the most successful team. Bolívar joined the Liga Argentina de Voleibol for the 2002–03 season, supported by Argentine TV host and entrepreneur Marcelo Tinelli. Since then, the team has won 6 titles, including a run of four consecutive wins.

== Current teams ==
The following clubs are playing the current 2025–26 season:

Club	City	Province
Boca Juniors	Buenos Aires	Buenos Aires City
Club Ciudad	Buenos Aires	Buenos Aires Province
Defensores de Banfield	Banfield	Buenos Aires Province
Monteros Vóley	Monteros	Tucumán
River Plate	Buenos Aires	Buenos Aires City
San Lorenzo de Almagro	Buenos Aires	Buenos Aires City
Tucumán de Gimnasia	San Miguel	Tucumán
Vélez Sarsfield	Buenos Aires	Buenos Aires City
Waiwen Vóley Club	Comodoro Rivadavia	Chubut
UPCN Vóley Club	San Juan	San Juan

== Champions ==
Season	Champion	Runner-up
1996–97	Peñarol (MdP)	Boca Juniors
1997–98	Luz y Fuerza (N)	Ferro Carril Oeste
1998–99	River Plate	Club de Amigos
1999–00	Náutico Hacoaj	Olympikus (A)
2000–01	Olympikus (A)	Club de Amigos
2001–02	Rojas Scholem	U.B.A.
2002–03	Bolívar Signia	Rojas Scholem
2003–04	Bolívar Signia	Swiss Medical Monteros
2004–05	Swiss Medical Monteros	Orígenes Bolívar
2005–06	Club de Amigos	Rosario Sonder
2006–07	DirecTV Bolívar	Gigantes del Sur
2007–08	DirecTV Bolívar	Huracán Chubut Volley
2008–09	Drean Bolívar	La Unión de Formosa
2009–10	Drean Bolívar	UPCN Vóley Club
2010–11	UPCN Vóley Club	Drean Bolívar
2011–12	UPCN Vóley Club	Boca Río Uruguay Seguros
2012–13	UPCN Vóley Club	Buenos Aires Unidos
2013–14	UPCN Vóley Club	Lomas Vóley
2014–15	UPCN Vóley Club	Personal Bolívar
2015–16	UPCN San Juan Vóley	Personal Bolívar
2016–17	Personal Bolívar	UPCN San Juan Vóley
2017–18	UPCN San Juan Vóley	Personal Bolívar
2018–19	Personal Bolívar	Club Obras Sanitarias
2020–21	UPCN San Juan Vóley	Ciudad Vóley
2021–22	UPCN San Juan Vóley	Ciudad Vóley
2022–23	Ciudad Vóley	UPCN San Juan Vóley
2023–24	Ciudad Vóley	Policial Voley
2024–25	Ciudad Vóley	CEF 5
