= Danail Milušev =

Bulgarian volleyball player (born 1984)

Danail Milushev
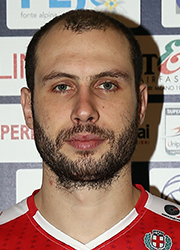

Personal information
- Nationality: Bulgarian
- Born: 3 February 1984 (age 42)
- Height: 2.00 m (6 ft 7 in)
- Weight: 102 kg (225 lb)
- Spike: 360 cm (142 in)
- Block: 340 cm (134 in)

Coaching information
Previous teams coached
| Years | Teams |
|---|---|
| 2021–2022; 2022–2024; 2024–2025 | Hebar Pazardzhik (assistant manager); Dobrudzha Dobrich; Cherno More BASK |

Volleyball information
- Number: 6

Career
| Years | Teams |
|---|---|
| 2002–2005; 2005–2006; 2006–2007; 2007–2008; 2008–2009; 2009–2010; 2010–2012; 2012–2013; 2013–2014; 2014–2015; 2015–2016; 2016–2017; 2017–2018; 2018–2021 | Neftochimic Burgas; Acanto Mantova; AS Cannes; Tours; Halkbank; Incheon Korean Air Jumbos; Castellana Grotte; Argos Volley; Spacer's Tolouse; Tokyo; Revivre Milano; Espadon Szczecin; Geosat Geovertical Lagonegro; Dunav Ruse |

National team
| 2006-2014 | Bulgaria |

Danail Milušev (Bulgarian: Данаил Милушев; born 3 February 1984) is a Bulgarian male volleyball player. He was part of the Bulgaria men's national volleyball team at the 2014 FIVB Volleyball Men's World Championship in Poland. He played for Power Volley Milano.

== Clubs ==
- 2002-2005 Neftohimik Burgas
- 2005-2006 Pallavolo Mantova
- 2006-2007 AS Cannes
- 2007-2008 Tours Volley-Ball
- 2008-2009 Halkbank Ankara
- 2009-2010 Korean Air Jumbos
- 2010-2012 NMV Castellana
- 2012-2013 Argos Sora
- 2013-2014 Spacer's Tolosa
- 2014-2015 FC Tokyo
- 2015- Power Volley Milano
