= Viktor Yosifov =

Bułgaria volleyball player (born 1985)

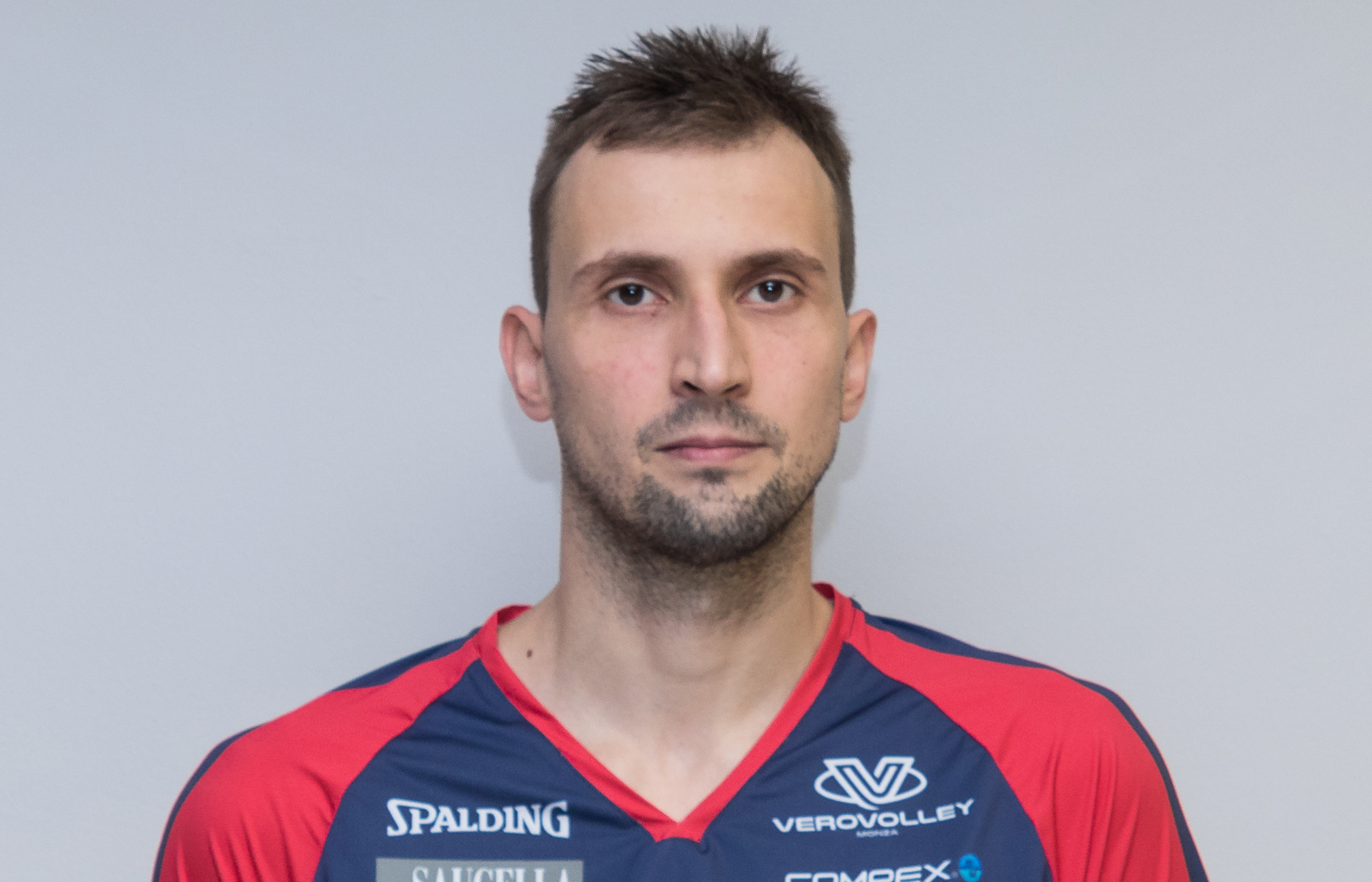

Personal information
- Nationality: (Bulgaria) Bulgarian
- Born: 16 October 1985 (age 41) Omurtag, Bulgaria
- Height: 2.05 m (6 ft 9 in)
- Weight: 97 kg (214 lb)
- Spike: 364 cm (143 in)
- Block: 345 cm (136 in)

Volleyball information
- Position: Middle blocker

Career
- Years: Team
- 2006–2009 2009–2011 2011–2012 2012–2013 2013–2014 2014–2015 2015–2016 2016–2018 2018–2020 2020–2021 2021–2023 2023–2025: (Bulgaria) Cherno More BASK (Italy) M. Roma Volley (Italy) Modena Volley (Italy) New Mater Volley (Germany) VfB Friedrichshafen (Russia) Guberniya Nizhniy Novgorod (Italy) Top Volley Latina (Italy) Volley Piacenza (Italy) Volley Milano (Poland) Czarni Radom (Bulgaria) Hebar Pazardzhik (Bulgaria) Cherno More BASK

National team
- Years: Team
- 2009–2020: Bulgaria
Honours
Men's volleyball
Representing Bulgaria
CEV European Championship
Bronze medal – third place	2009 Turkey	Team

Viktor Yosifov (Bulgarian: Виктор Йосифов) (born 16 October 1985) is a Bulgarian volleyball player. He is a former member of the Bulgaria men's national volleyball team. Yosifov is a bronze medallist of the 2009 European Championship.

== Sporting achievements ==
=== Clubs ===
- CEV Challenge Cup
  - 2018/2019 – with Vero Volley Monza
- National championships
  - 2013/2014 German Cup, with VfB Friedrichshafen
  - 2013/2014 German Championship, with VfB Friedrichshafen

=== Individual awards ===
- 2009: CEV European Championship – Best Blocker
- 2013: Italian Championship – Best Blocker
- 2015: CEV European Championship – Best Middle Blocker
- 2016: Italian Championship – Best Blocker
- 2018: Italian Championship – Best Blocker
- 2020: CEV Olympic Qualification – Best Middle Blocker

Awards
Preceded by First Award	Best Middle Blocker of CEV European Championship; 2015 ex aequo (Bulgaria) Teodor Todorov	Succeeded by (Serbia) Srećko Lisinac (Germany) Marcus Böhme
