= Boris Nachev =

Bulgarian volleyball player

Personal information
- Full name: Boris Biserov Nachev
- Nationality: Bulgarian
- Born: 22 April 2004 (age 22); Varna, Bulgaria
- Height: 202 cm (6 ft 8 in)
- Weight: 85 kg (187 lb)
- Spike: 350 cm (138 in)
- Block: 335 cm (132 in)

Volleyball information
- Position: Middle blocker
- Current club: Pallavolo Padova
- Number: 8

Career
Years	Teams
2020–2025; 2025–	Cherno More BASK; Pallavolo Padova

National team
2020–2022; 2022; 2024–	Bulgaria U19; Bulgaria U21; Bulgaria
Honours
Men's volleyball
Representing Bulgaria
FIVB World Championship
Silver medal – second place	2025 Philippines

Boris Biserov Nachev (Bulgarian: Борис Бисеров Начев; born 22 April 2004) is a Bulgarian professional volleyball player who plays as a middle blocker for Pallavolo Padova and the Bulgaria national team.

== Club career ==
Boris Nachev started his volleyball club career at hometown club Cherno More BASK. He played there for 5 years from 2020. Nachev won the best middle blocker for the 2024–25 Bulgarian League season. On 15 June 2025, Nachev was officially announced as a new signing of the Italian club Pallavolo Padova. On 11 December 2025, Nachev won 'Best athlete of SC Cherno More'.

== National team career ==
Boris Nachev was a part of Bulgaria's 2025 World Championsip silver medal.

== Honuors ==
=== Team ===
Club

- 2021–22 NVL Top League
- 2021–22 Bulgarian Top League Cup

National team

- 2021 World Championship U19
- 2022 European Youth Olympic Festival U19
- 2022 European Championships U21
- 2025 World Championship

=== Individual ===
- 2024–25 Bulgarian League–Best middle blocker
- 2025 JSC Cherno More–Best athlete
