= Teodor Salparov =

Bulgarian volleyball player

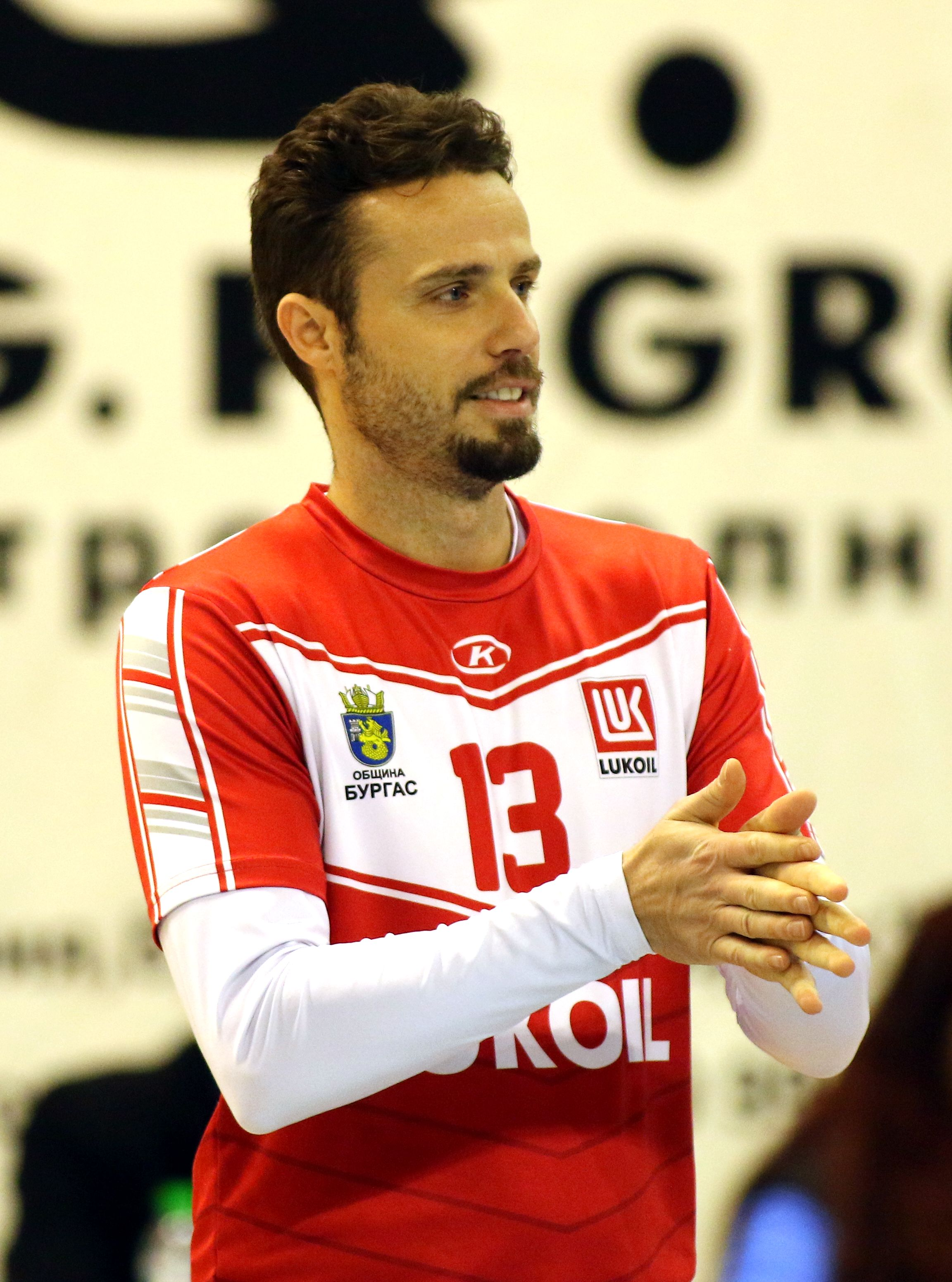
- Salparov in 2018

Personal information
- Nationality: Bulgarian
- Born: 16 August 1982 (age 44); Gabrovo, Bulgaria
- Height: 1.87 m (6 ft 2 in)
- Weight: 77 kg (170 lb)
- Spike: 320 cm (126 in)
- Block: 305 cm (120 in)

Volleyball information
- Position: Libero
- Current club: VC Hebar Pazardzhik
- Number: 13

Career
Years	Teams
2003–2004; 2004–2005; 2005–2006; 2006–2007; 2007–2009; 2009–2010; 2010–2012; 2012–2013; 2013–2014; 2014–2017; 2017–2019; 2019–2020; 2020–2022; 2022–	CSKA Sofia; Luch Moscow; Gazprom-Ugra Surgut; Dynamo Moscow; CSKA Sofia; Dynamo Moscow; CSKA Sofia; Galatasaray Istanbul; ASUL Lyon; Zenit Kazan; Neftochimic Burgas; Gazprom-Ugra Surgut; Neftochimic Burgas; Hebar Pazardzhik

National team
1999–2023	Bulgaria
Honours
Men's volleyball
Representing Bulgaria
World Championship
Bronze medal – third place	2006 Japan
World Cup
Bronze medal – third place	2007 Japan
European Championship
Bronze medal – third place	2009 Turkey
- Last updated: 24 October 2016

Teodor Salparov (Bulgarian: Теодор Салпаров born 16 August 1982) is a Bulgarian volleyball player, a member of the Bulgaria men's national volleyball team and the Bulgarian club VC Hebar Pazardzhik. He was a participant in the Olympic Games (Beijing 2008, London 2012), and was a bronze medalist in the 2006 World Championship, 2007 World Cup and 2009 European Championship.

== Career ==
=== Clubs ===
In 2014 went to Russian Zenit Kazan. In March 2015 he achieved gold medal of 2014–15 CEV Champions League with Russian club. In 2017 Salparov signed for Bulgarian Neftochimic. His teammates in Bulgaria national team Georgi Bratoev and Valentin Bratoev signed for the Burgas team the same year. With the Bulgarian team, Salparov became 2 time national champion.

=== National team ===
On September 4, 2009 Bulgarian national team, including Salparov, won the bronze medal at the European Championship 2009. They beat Italy in 3rd place match 3–0.

== Sporting achievements ==
=== Clubs ===
==== FIVB Club World Championship ====
- 2015 - with Zenit Kazan
- 2016 - with Zenit Kazan

==== CEV Champions League ====
- 2006/2007 - with Dynamo Moscow
- 2009/2010 - with Dynamo Moscow
- 2014/2015 - with Zenit Kazan
- 2015/2016 - with Zenit Kazan
- 2016/2017 - with Zenit Kazan

==== National championships ====
- 2006/2007 Russian Cup, with Dynamo Moscow
- 2006/2007 Russian Championship, with Dynamo Moscow
- 2007/2008 Bulgarian Championship, with CSKA Sofia
- 2008/2009 Bulgarian Championship, with CSKA Sofia
- 2009/2010 Russian Championship, with Dynamo Moscow
- 2014/2015 Russian Cup, with Zenit Kazan
- 2015/2016 Russian Championship, with Zenit Kazan
- 2016/2017 Russian Championship, with Zenit Kazan
- 2017/2018 Bulgarian Championship, with Neftochimic Burgas
- 2018/2019 Bulgarian Championship, with Neftochimic Burgas

=== National team ===
- 2006 FIVB World Championship
- 2007 FIVB World Cup
- 2009 CEV European Championship

==== Individual ====
- 2010 Memorial of Hubert Jerzy Wagner - Best Libero
- 2012 Olympic Games London - Best Digger
- 2015 CEV Champions League - Best Libero

Awards
Preceded by (Poland) Damian Wojtaszek	Best Libero of CEV Champions League; 2014/2015	Succeeded by (France) Jenia Grebennikov
