= Denis Karyagin =

Bulgarian volleyball player (born 2002)

Personal information
- Born: 28 September 2002 (age 24); Burgas, Bulgaria
- Height: 2.04 m (6 ft 8 in)
- Weight: 84 kg (185 lb)
- Spike: 340 cm (134 in)
- Block: 325 cm (128 in)

Volleyball information
- Position: Outside hitter
- Current club: Fenerbahçe
- Number: 18

Career
Years	Teams
2018–2021; 2021–2022; 2022–2023; 2023–2024; 2024; 2024–	Neftochimic Burgas; Vero Volley Monza; ZAKSA Kędzierzyn-Koźle; Spacer's de Toulouse; Lokomotiv Novosibirsk; Fenerbahçe

National team
2021–	Bulgaria

Denis Karyagin (Bulgarian: Денис Карягин; born 28 September 2002) is a Bulgarian professional volleyball player who plays as an outside hitter for Fenerbahçe and the Bulgaria national team.

== Honours ==
=== Club ===
- CEV Champions League
  - 2022–23 with ZAKSA Kędzierzyn-Koźle
- CEV Cup
  - 2021–22 – with Vero Volley Monza
- Domestic
  - 2018–19 Bulgarian SuperCup, with Neftochimic Burgas
  - 2018–19 Bulgarian Championship, with Neftochimic Burgas
  - 2020–21 Bulgarian SuperCup, with Neftochimic Burgas
  - 2020–21 Bulgarian Cup, with Neftochimic Burgas
  - 2022–23 Polish Cup, with ZAKSA Kędzierzyn-Koźle
  - 2024–25 Turkish Cup, with Fenerbahçe
