= Bulgarian Women's Volleyball League =

Sporting competition

- Current season, competition or edition: 2021–22 Women's Bulgarian Volleyball League
- Sport: Volleyball
- Founded: 1942
- First season: 1942
- Administrator: БФВ
- No. of teams: 8 (2021–22)
- Country: Bulgaria
- Continent: Europe
- Most recent champion: Maritsa Plovdiv (11th title)
- Most titles: Levski Sofia (28 titles)
- Level on pyramid: 1
- Domestic cups: Bulgarian Cup; Bulgarian Super Cup
- International cups: CEV Champions League; CEV Cup; CEV Challenge Cup
- Website: http://www.volleyball.bg/

The Bulgarian Women's Volleyball League in (Bulgarian Национална волейболна лига жени) is the most important Bulgarian women's volleyball competition organized by the Bulgarian Volleyball Federation (Българска Федерация Волейбол, БФВ), it was created in 1942.

== History ==
The Bulgaria National Women' s Volleyball League is organized by the Bulgarian Volleyball Federation. It has been held annually since its inception in 1942 and has changed its name over the years. The teams of CSKA, Levski, Maritsa (Plovdiv) have a traditional strong presence and performance. The national champion of Bulgaria with 2nd and third place represents the country in the European club volleyball competitions.

== List of Champions ==
Years	Champions
1942	AS 23 Sofia
1943	AS 23 Sofia
1944	Championship Cancelled
1945	Slavia Sofia
1946	Chavdar Sofia
1947	Chavdar Sofia
1948	Spartak Sofia
1949	Rudnichar Pernik
1950	Torpedo Karlovo
1951	Torpedo Karlovo
1952	Akademik Sofia
1953	Dimitrovo Pernik
1954	Akademik Sofia
1955	Udarnik Sofia
1956	VC Minyor Pernik
1957	Slavia Sofia
1958	Slavia Sofia
1959	Levski Sofia
1960	VC Minyor Pernik
1961	Slavia Sofia
1962	Levski Sofia
1963	Levski Sofia
1964	Levski Sofia
1965	Levski Sofia
1966	Levski Sofia
1967	Levski Sofia
1968	Akademik Sofia
1969	Akademik Sofia

Years	Champions
1970	Levski-Spartak Sofia
1971	Levski-Spartak Sofia
1972	Levski-Spartak Sofia
1973	Levski-Spartak Sofia
1974	Levski-Spartak Sofia
1975	Levski-Spartak Sofia
1976	Levski-Spartak Sofia
1977	Levski-Spartak Sofia
1978	CSKA Sofia
1979	CSKA Sofia
1980	Levski-Spartak Sofia
1981	Levski-Spartak Sofia
1982	CSKA Sofia
1983	CSKA Sofia
1984	Levski-Spartak Sofia
1985	CSKA Sofia
1986	CSKA Sofia
1987	CSKA Sofia
1988	CSKA Sofia
1989	CSKA Sofia
1990	Levski-Spartak Sofia
1991	CSKA Sofia
1992	CSKA Sofia
1993	CSKA Sofia
1994	Akademik Sofia
1995	CSKA Sofia
1996	Levski Sofia
1997	Levski Sofia

Years	Champions
1998	Levski Sofia
1999	Levski Sofia
2000	CSKA Sofia
2001	Levski Sofia
2002	Levski Sofia
2003	Levski Sofia
2004	CSKA Sofia
2005	CSKA Sofia
2006	Energy Varna
2007	CSKA Sofia
2008	CSKA Sofia
2009	Levski Sofia
2010	CSKA Sofia
2011	CSKA Sofia
2012	CSKA Sofia
2013	CSKA Sofia
2014	Levski Sofia
2015	Maritsa Plovdiv
2016	Maritsa Plovdiv
2017	Maritsa Plovdiv
2018	Maritsa Plovdiv
2019	Maritsa Plovdiv
2020	Maritsa Plovdiv
2021	Maritsa Plovdiv
2022	Maritsa Plovdiv
2023	Maritsa Plovdiv
2024	Maritsa Plovdiv
2025	Maritsa Plovdiv

== Table by club ==
rk	Club	Titles #	City	Years won
1	Levski Sofia	28	Sofia	1959, (1962—1967), (1970—1977), (1980—1981), 1984, 1990, (1996—1999), (2001—2003), 2009, 2014
2	CSKA Sofia	24	Sofia	(1978—1979), (1982—1983), (1985—1989), (1991—1993), 1995, 2000, (2004—2005), (2007—2008), (2010—2013)
3	Maritsa Plovdiv	11	Plovdiv	(2015—2025)
4	Slavia Sofia	5	Sofia	1945, 1955, (1957—1958), 1961
=	Akademik Sofia	5	Sofia	1952, 1954, (1968—1969), 1994
6	Minyor Pernik	4	Pernik	1949, 1953, 1956, 1960
7	AS 23 Sofia	2	Sofia	(1942—1943)
=	Chavdar Sofia	2	Sofia	(1946—1947)
=	Torpedo Karlovo	2	Karlovo	(1950—1951)
9	Spartak Sofia	1	Sofia	1948
=	Energy Varna	1	Varna	2006

== See also ==
- Bulgarian Men's Volleyball League
