= Bulgarian Women's Volleyball Cup =

Volleyball in Bulgaria

- Sport: Volleyball
- Founded: 1954
- Administrator: БФБ
- Country: Bulgaria
- Continent: Europe
- Most recent champion: VK Maritsa (7th titles)
- Most titles: Levski Sofia (27 titles)
- Website: http://www.volleyball.bg/

The Bulgarian Women's Volleyball Cup is a Bulgarian women's volleyball cup competition held every year. It is organized by the Bulgarian Volleyball Federation (Българска Федерация Волейбол БФБ). It was established in 1954.

== Competition Format ==
The competition follows an autumn–spring format and consists of a preliminary stage and a knockout phase. The winners of the semi-finals advance to the final, where they compete for the Cup.

In the 2025/26 Cup final, Maritza defeated Levski 3–0.

== Winners list ==
Years	Winners	Score	Runners-up
1954	VK Slavia Sofia		
1955	VK Minyor Pernik		VK Slavia Sofia
1956	VK Slavia Sofia		Lokomotiv Sofia
1957	VK Slavia Sofia		
1958 : Competition Not Disputed
1959	Levski Sofia		
1960	Levski Sofia		
1961	Levski Sofia		
1962–1965 : Competition Not Disputed
1966	Levski Sofia		
1967	Levski Sofia		
1968	Akademik Sofia		
1969	CSKA Sofia		
1970	Levski Sofia		
1971	VK Slavia Sofia		
1972	Levski Sofia		
1973	Levski Sofia		
1974	Levski Sofia		VK Slavia Sofia
1975	VK Minyor Pernik		
1976	CSKA Sofia		
1977	VK Slavia Sofia		
1978	Levski Sofia		
1979	CSKA Sofia		
1980	Levski Sofia		
1981	CSKA Sofia		
1982	CSKA Sofia		
1983	CSKA Sofia		
1984	Dunav Ruse		
1985	CSKA Sofia		
1986	CSKA Sofia		
1987	Levski Sofia		
1988	CSKA Sofia		
1989	CSKA Sofia		
1990	Levski Sofia		
1991	Levski Sofia		
1992	Levski Sofia		Lokomotiv Sofia
1993	CSKA Sofia		
1994	Levski Sofia		
1995	CSKA Sofia		VK Slavia Sofia
1996	CSKA Sofia		
1997	Levski Sofia		
1998	Levski Sofia		VK Slavia Sofia
1999	Levski Sofia		
2000	CSKA Sofia		
2001	Levski Sofia		
2002	Levski Siconco Sofia	3–2 (?)	CSKA Sofia
2003	Levski Siconco Sofia	3–1 (?)	CSKA Sofia
2004	CSKA Sofia	3–1 (15–25, 25–21, 25–16, 25–15)	Levski Siconco Sofia
2005	Levski Siconco Sofia	3–2 (25–23, 22–25, 25–16, 21–25, 15–10)	CSKA Sofia
2006	Levski Siconco Sofia	3–0 (25–13, 25–20, 25–17)	CSKA Sofia
2007	VK Slavia Sofia		
2008	CSKA Sofia	3–0 (25–23, 25–12, 26–24)	Levski Siconco Sofia
2009	Levski Siconco Sofia	3–2 (17–25, 27–25, 25–15, 18–25, 22–20)	CSKA Sofia
2010	CSKA Sofia	3–0 (25–19, 25–17, 25–15)	Levski Siconco Sofia
2011	CSKA Sofia	3–0 (25–20, 26–24, 25–12)	VK Maritsa Plovdiv
2012	VK Maritsa Plovdiv	3–0 (25–18, 25–20, 25–14)	Levski Sofia
2013	CSKA Sofia	3–2 (17–25, 18–25, 25–19, 28–26, 15–13)	Kazanlak Volley
2014	Levski Sofia	3–2 (31–33, 19–25, 25–12, 25–20, 15–12)	CSKA Sofia
2015	VK Maritsa Plovdiv	3–2 (25–21, 16–25, 25–20, 25–27, 15–12)	Levski Sofia
2016	Levski Sofia	3–1 (25–9, 22–25, 25–23, 25–17)	VK Maritsa Plovdiv
2017	VK Maritsa Plovdiv	3–0 (25–15, 25–18, 25–12)	VK Slavia Sofia
2018	VK Maritsa Plovdiv	3–1 (23–25, 25–16, 26–24, 25–20)	Levski Sofia
2019	VK Maritsa Plovdiv	3–0 (25–15, 25–13, 25–7)	SKV Beroe
2020 : Competition Stopped Cause of COVID-19
2021	VK Maritsa Plovdiv	3–0 (25–11, 25–13, 25–15)	CSKA Sofia
2022			

== Honours by club ==
Rk.	Club	Titles	City	Years
1	Levski Sofia	27	Sofia	(1959–1961), (1966–1967), 1970, (1972–1974), 1978, 1980, 1987, (1990–1992),1994, (1997–1999), (2001–2003), (2005–2006), 2009, 2014, 2016
2	CSKA Sofia	19	Sofia	1969, 1976, 1979, (1981–1983), (1985–1986), (1988–1989), 1993, (1995–1996), 2000, 2004, 2008, (2010–2011), 2013
3	Maritsa Plovdiv	8	Plovdiv	2012, 2015, (2017–2023)
4	Slavia Sofia	6	Sofia	1954, (1956–1957), 1971, 1977, 2007
5	Minyor Pernik	2	Pernik	1955, 1975
6	Akademik Sofia	1	Sofia	1968
=	Dunav Ruse	1	Ruse	1984
