= Hristo Borisov Hall =

- Зала „Христо Борисов“
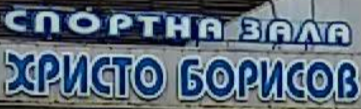
- Interactive map of Hristo Borisov Hall
- Address: 9 Nikola Vaptsarov Street; 9000 Varna, Bulgaria
- Coordinates: 43°12′52″N 27°55′57″E
- Owner: Varna Municipality
- Capacity: 1,000

Construction
- Built: 1990
- Opened: 1991

Tenants
- BC Cherno More Ticha (basketball); VC Cherno More BASK (volleyball)

Hristo Borisov Hall (Bulgarian: Зала „Христо Борисов“) is a multi-purpose indoor sports arena located in Varna, Bulgaria. It is primarily used for basketball, volleyball but sometimes it is used for other local sporting events. Opened in 1991, it has a seating capacity of 1,000. It was formerly called Cherno More Hall. The venue was named after the lengendary basketball player for Cherno More Ticha Hristo Borisov after his death in 2005.

== History ==
The hall was constructed between 1990 and 1991, during a period when Varna needed additional indoor sports infrastructure to support its rapidly developing athletic clubs. It officially opened in 1991, functioning as part of the broader municipal sports facilities of the city. With a capacity of approximately 1,000 seats, the arena was designed primarily for basketball and volleyball but has hosted a wide range of athletic and community events throughout its existence. Originally known under Cherno More Hall the hall was officially renamed in honor of the legendary baskteballer Hristo Borisov following his passing in 2005. Borisov was a distinguished athlete for the Varna basketball club and a member of the Bulgarian national team. To commemorate his legacy, a bas-relief made by sculptor Kiril Yanev was installed in front of the building, and the hall became a symbolic home for the city's basketball tradition.

== Tenants ==
=== Basketball ===
For basketball the hall is primarily used for hosting the Cherno More Ticha's home games in the National Basketball League and in the Bulgarian Cup. In addition to official league fixtures, the hall hosts the pre-season tournament Black Sea games. The tournament is played before the new basketball season. The venue is also regularly used by the club's youth and reserve teams, who train and compete there throughout the year. This makes the hall a central development ground for new talent within the Cherno More organization.

=== Volleyball ===
For volleyball the hall is used for hosting Cherno More BASK's home games in the Bulgarian Volleyball League and in the Bulgarian Cup.
