= Lyubomir Ganev =

Bulgarian volleyball player (born 1965)

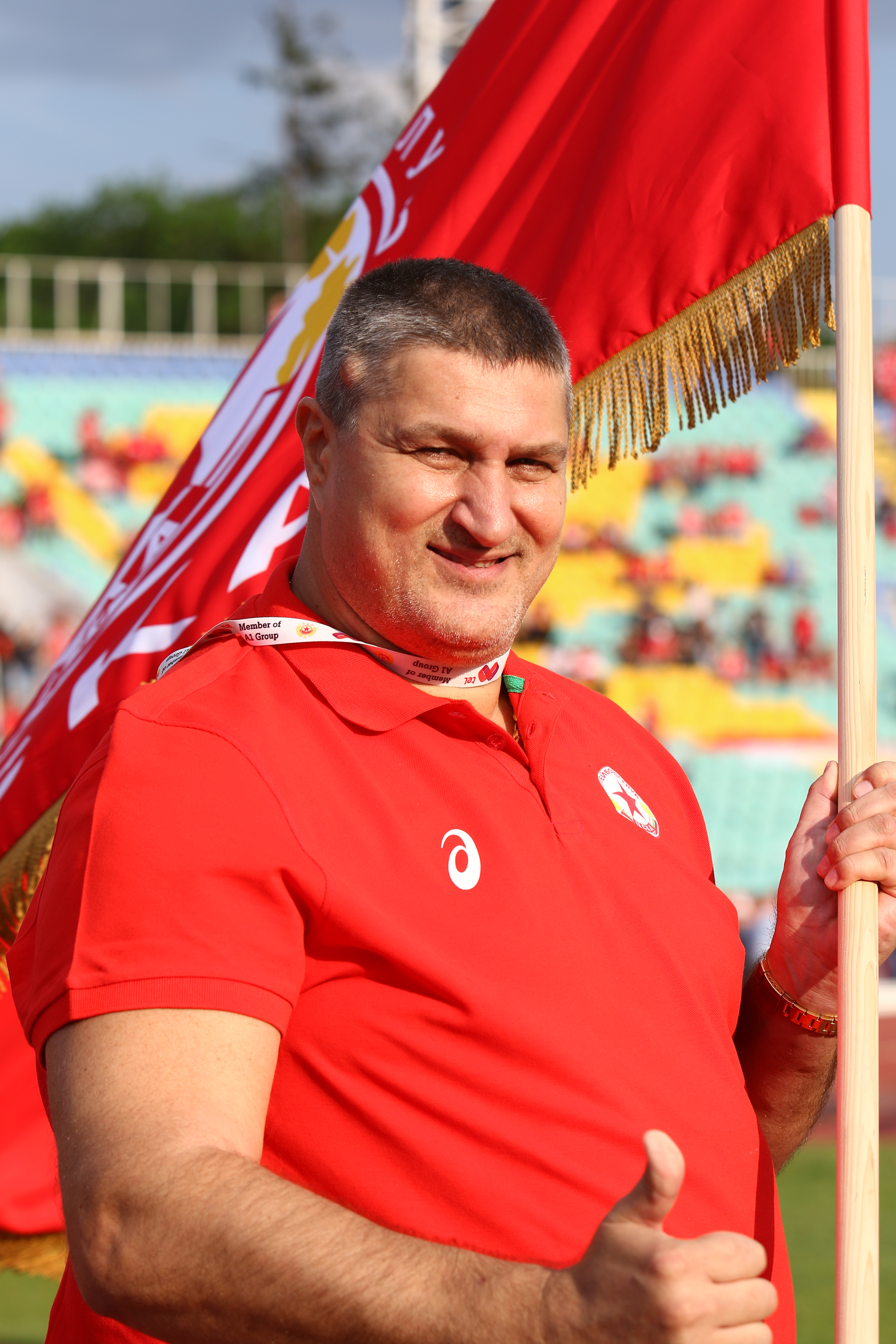

Personal information
- Full name: Lyubomir Eftimov Ganev
- Nickname: Lubo
- Nationality: Bulgarian
- Born: 6 October 1965 (age 61) Ruse, Bulgaria
- Height: 210 cm (6 ft 11 in)
- Weight: 170 kg (375 lb)

Volleyball information

National team
- Years: Team
- 1985–1998: Bulgaria

Lyubomir Eftimov Ganev (Bulgarian: Любомир Ефтимов Ганев; born 6 October 1965 in Ruse), a.k.a. Lyubo Ganev or Lubo, is a Bulgarian former volleyball player and the President of the Bulgarian Volleyball Federation since 2020.

Lyubo Ganev was born in Ruse, where he started his career. He played with CSKA Sofia for seven years and was five times a champion of the Bulgarian Volleyball League with the team. From 1991 to 1997, Ganev played for several Italian teams, including Alpitour Cuneo, Agrigento, Spoleto and Fano, before finishing his career at Greek side Aris VC in 1998.

He was a key member of Bulgaria's national team from 1985 until 1998. He is 210 cm tall. He competed at the 1988 Summer Olympics and 1996 Summer Olympics.

In 2018, Ganev published a book called "The World from Above". The book was written with Bulgarian sports journalists Todor Shabanski and Vladimir Pamukov, and photo-journalist Bonchuk Andonov.
