= Gianlorenzo Blengini =

Italian volleyball coach (born 1971)

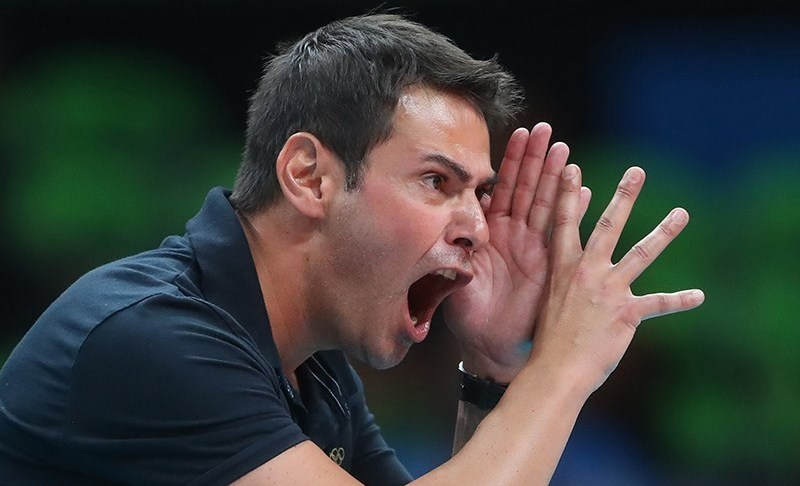
- Blengini in 2016

Personal information
- Nickname: Chicco
- Nationality: Italian
- Born: 29 December 1971 (age 54); Turin, Italy
- Height: 182 cm (6 ft 0 in)

Coaching information
- Current team: Bulgaria
Previous teams coached
Years	Teams
2000–2001; 2001–2004; 2004–2006; 2006–2009; 2009–2011; 2011–2014; 2014–2015; 2014–2015; 2015–2017; 2015–2021; 2021–2024; 2024–	Torino (assistant); Piacenza (assistant); Modena (assistant); Gabeca (assistant); Lupi Santa Croce; Callipo; Top Volley Latina; Italy (assistant); Volley Lube; Italy; Volley Lube; Bulgaria
Honours
Men's volleyball
Head coach Italy
Olympic Games
Silver medal – second place	2016 Brazil
Mediterranean Games
Gold medal – first place	2018 Spain
Universiade
Gold medal – first place	2019 Italy
CEV European Championship
Bronze medal – third place	2015 Bulgaria/Italy
FIVB World Cup
Silver medal – second place	2015 Japan
FIVB World Grand Champions Cup
Silver medal – second place	2015 Japan
Head coach Bulgaria
FIVB World Championship
Silver medal – second place	2025 Philippines

Gianlorenzo Blengini (born 29 December 1971) is an Italian volleyball coach. He is currently in charge of the Bulgaria men's national team. Blengini was promoted from the role of assistant coach in the Italian team after working under former coach, Mauro Berruto.

With the Italian national team, Blengini won a silver medal at the World Cup in 2015, a bronze medal at the European Championship, and a silver medal at the 2016 Summer Olympics in Rio de Janeiro.

== Bulgaria men's national volleyball team ==
Blengini was appointed as head coach of the Bulgarian national team in May 2024. In an interview, the President of the Bulgarian Volleyball Federation, Lyubomir Ganev, stated that Blengini had shared his observations on the Bulgarian team, specifically the young players who were training with Volley Lube, based on an agreement between the Italian team and Levski Volley. Ganev reported that Blengini had expressed his interest to coach the team after recognizing the "great potential" of the youngsters.

== Tournaments ==
=== National teams tournaments ===
The Olympics (Men) 2016

- (1) Silver

European Championships (Men) 2021

- (1) Gold

Grand Champions Cup (Men) 2017

- (1) Gold

Mediterranean Games (Men) 2018

- (1) Gold

FISU World University Games (Men) 2019

- (1) Gold

=== Clubs tournaments ===
Champions League (Men)

- (3) Bronze 2023/24, 2016/17, 2015/16

Club World Championship (Men)

- (1) Silver 2021/22

Italian Serie A1 (Men)

- (3) Gold 2021/22, 2020/21, 2016/17
- (2) Silver 2022/23, 2003/04
- (2) Bronze 2015/16, 2005/06

Challenge Cup (Men)

- (1) Silver 2003/04

Italian Cup (Men)

- (2) Gold 2020/21, 2016/17
- (2) Bronze 2015/16, 2012/13

Italian Serie A2 (Men)

- (1) Gold 2001/02
- (1) Bronze 2010/11

Italian Supercup (Men)

- (3) Silver 2023/24, 2022/23, 2020/21
- (2) Bronze 2021/22, 2016/17

Italian Cup A2 (Men)

- (3) Gold 2010/11, 2001/02, 2000/01
