= Bulgarian Volleyball Federation =

Governing body of volleyball in Bulgaria

- Sport: Volleyball; Beach volleyball
- Jurisdiction: Bulgaria
- Abbreviation: BVF
- Founded: 1947
- Affiliation: FIVB
- Regional affiliation: CEV; Balkan Volleyball Association
- Headquarters: Sofia
- Location: Bulgaria
- President: Lubomir Ganev

Official website
- www.bvf.bg
- (Bulgaria)

Bulgarian Volleyball Federation (Bulgarian: Българска Федерация по Волейбол, Bŭlgarska Federatsiya po Voleĭbol) is the governing body of volleyball and beach volleyball in Bulgaria. Formed in 1947, it is based in Sofia. The BVF is a member of the International Volleyball Federation (FIVB) and the European Volleyball Confederation (CEV).

== Volleyball ==
=== National League ===
Men's leagues

- Bulgarian Volleyball League (12 teams)
- Bulgaria Men's Volleyball First League (24 teams in two groups)
- Bulgaria Men's Volleyball Second League (54 teams in four groups)
- Bulgaria Men's Regional Volleybal League (125 teams in thirty five groups)

Men's cups

- Bulgaria Men's Volleyball Cup
- Men's Super Cup

Women's leagues

- Acıbadem Women's Volleyball League (14 teams)

Bulgaria Women's Volleyball First League (24 teams in two groups)

- Bulgaria Women's Volleyball Second League (155 teams in sixteen groups)
- Bulgaria Women's Regional Volleybal League (219 teams in sixty four groups)

Women's cups

- Teledünya Women's Volleyball Cup
- Women's Super Cup

The teams of the national club competition, the SuperLeague are:

- CSKA Sofia
- Neftochimic 2010
- Levski Volley
- VC Pirin Razlog
- VC Marek Union-Ivkoni
- Cherno More BASK
- Arda
- Montana Volley
- Botev Lukovit
- Victoria Volley
- VC Gabrovo
- VC Slavia Sofia

The "Vissha Liga" teams are:

- VC Dunav Ruse
- Teteven Volley
- VC Dobrudzha 07 Dobrich
- Hyster Volley LTU
- VC UNWE Sofia
- VC Septemvri Pro Cinema
- VC Minyor Pernik
- VC Rodopa Smolyan
- Izgrev Volley Yablanitsa

== See also ==
- Bulgaria men's team
- Bulgaria men's U19 team
- Bulgaria men's U21 team
- Bulgaria men's U23 team
- Bulgaria women's team
- Bulgaria women's U18 team
- Bulgaria women's U20 team
- Bulgaria women's U23 team
