= VC Marek Union-Ivkoni =

Bulgarian volleyball team

- Founded: 1996
- Ground: Hall Dupnitsa (European competitions); Hall Dupnitsa (Domestic competitions) (Capacity: 1,505)
- League: Bulgarian Volleyball Super League; CEV Champions League

VC Marek Union-Ivkoni is a professional men's volleyball team, based in Dupnitsa. VC Marek Union-Ivkoni plays in the Bulgarian League, Bulgarian Cup and the European Champions League.

== Honors ==
- Champions 4 times:
  - 2012, 2013, 2014, 2015
- Cup winners 1 times:
  - 2013
