= Neftochimic 2010 =

Neftochimic 2010 Burgas
- Full name: Volleyball Club "Neftochimic 2010" Burgas
- Short name: Neftochimic
- Founded: September 2006
- Ground: Mladost, Sport Hall; Burgas, Bulgaria (Capacity: 1,200)
- Chairman: Ognyan Tomov
- Manager: Nikolay Jeliazkov
- Captain: Georgi Bratoev
- League: Bulgarian Volleyball Super League
- 2022/2023: 1st

Uniforms
Home	Away

Neftochimic 2010 (Bulgarian: Нефтохимик 2010), until 2006 known as Lukoil Neftochimic (Bulgarian: Лукойл Нефтохимик), is a professional men's volleyball team based in Burgas, Bulgaria. It plays in the Super League (four-time champion).

== History ==
The founding of the club is like a volleyball section at FTU Neftochimic. During this period, there were no major successes in the club. With the purchase of the club by Lukoil, the team became part of the Bulgarian volleyball elite. During this period the club's name was Lukoil Neftochimic. In 2006, the first big success of the team was, when the team made a golden double, winning their first title and the Cup of Bulgaria. In the September 2011 year, the name of the club was changed to Neftochimic 2010. The second title was won in the season 2016-17, defeating the Montana Volley in the final match and the third title was won in 2017-18 when Neftochimic defeated the final games against CSKA. In 2017 - 2018 the team was filled with a world class players such as the Bratoevi brothers (Georgi Bratoev and Valentin Bratoev) and Teodor Salparov. In this season the team won the championship, the Cup of Bulgaria and the Super Cup.

In April 2018, Neftochimic recorded a historic golden treble, which is the best achievement of the club since it was founded. In the beginning of 2019 the team achieved its best result in Europe. The team from Burgas play 1/4 finals in the second-highest European tournament CEV Cup, where they were defeated by Olympiakos after a 3-1 victory in Burgas, a loss of 0-3 in Athens and a lost golden game.

== Achievements ==
- 6 times Champion in Bulgarian Super League (2006/07, 2016/17, 2017/18, 2018/2019 2019/2020, 2022/2023)
- 6 times Vice-Champion in Bulgarian Volleyball Super League (2004/05, 2005/06, 2009/10, 2015/16, 2020/2021, 2021/2022)
- 5 time bronze medalist in Bulgarian Volleyball Super League (2003/04, 2007/08, 2008/09, 2010/11 and 2011/12)
- 5 times Winner of Bulgarian Volleyball Cup (2007, 2008, 2016, 2018, 2020)
- 3 times Winner of Bulgarian Volleyball Super Cup (2016, 2017, and 2018)
- 1-time winner of „Team of the year“ award in Burgas (2018 г.)
- 1 time Winner of „Team of the month“ award in Bulgaria (2018 г.)

== Players ==
Updated on March 25, 2019

Setters
7	(Bulgaria) Georgi Bratoev
10	(Bulgaria) Lubomir Agontsev

Middle blockers
3	(Bulgaria) Stoyan Samunev
18	(Bulgaria) Teodor Todorov
9	(Bulgaria) Ilia Petkov
19	(Bulgaria) Nikolay Kartev

Wing spikers
17	(Bulgaria) Georgi Petrov
5	(Slovenia) Alen Djordjevic
2	(Bulgaria) Denis Karyagin
7	(Bulgaria) Andrey Nikolov

Attackers
15	(Bulgaria) Nikolay Uchikov
14	(Bulgaria) Peter Hristov

Libero
13	(Bulgaria) Симеон Добрев
8	(Bulgaria) Ивайло Лалов

== Hall of Fame ==
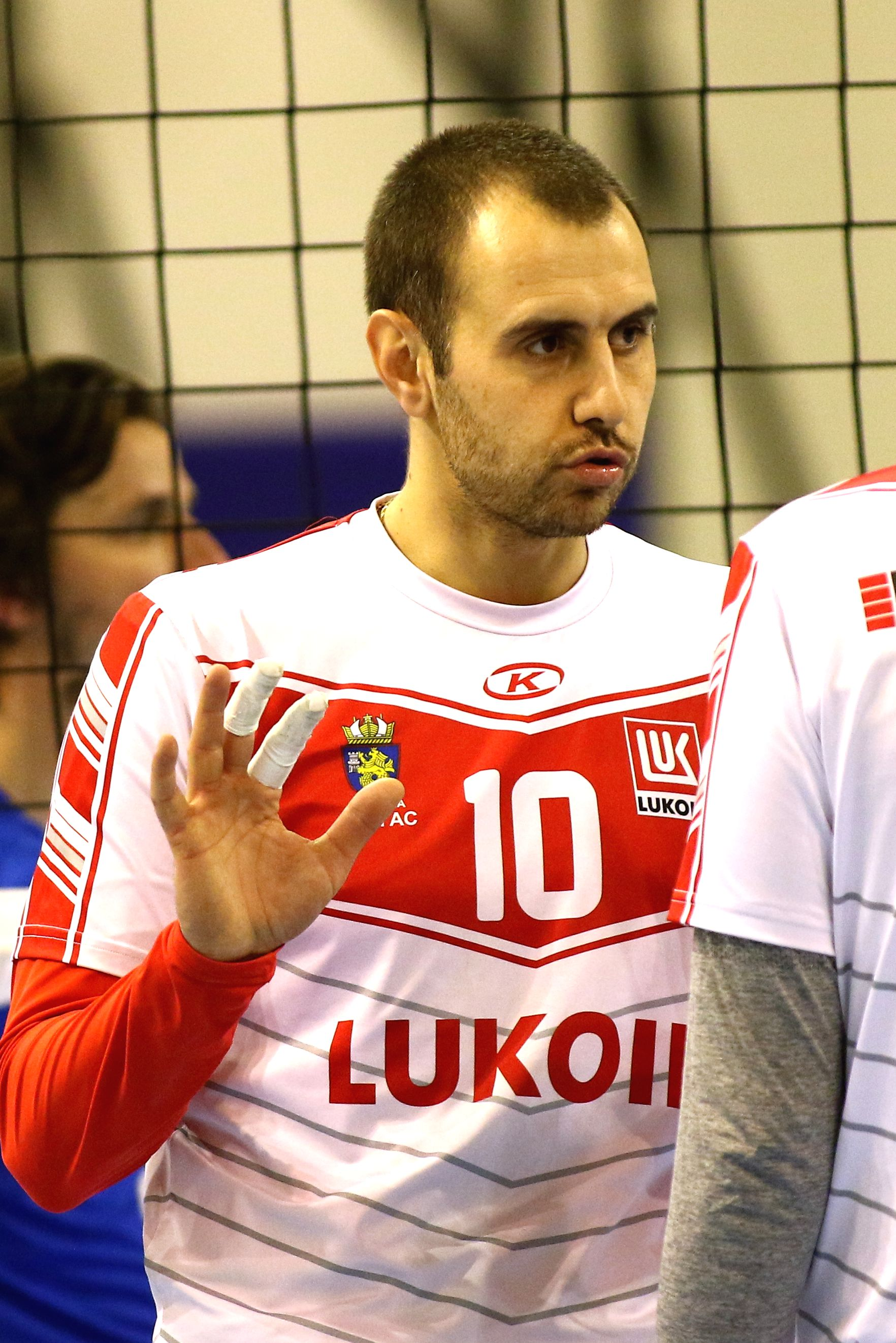
Valentin Bratoev was a Neftochimic player in 2018.

Emblematic volleyball players played for Neftochimic 2010:

- Valentin Bratoev – Player in Bulgaria men's national volleyball team; Bronze medalist of the European Championship in 2009; Vice Champion of the First European Games in 2015;
- Georgi Bratoev – Player in Bulgaria men's national volleyball team; Bronze medalist of the European Championship in 2009; Best settler of the 2012 World League finals in Sofia; Best settler at the Olympic games in London 2012; Vice Champion of the First European Games in 2015;
- Nikolay Uchikov – Player in Bulgaria men's national volleyball team; Series A2 top performer in season 2011/2012; World Club Champion with Trentino Volleyball 2012
- Alen Djordjevic – Player in Slovenia men's national volleyball team;
- Teodor Salparov – Pleyer in Bulgaria men's national volleyball team; Winner of the Cup and the Super Cup of Russia with Dynamo in 2007; Bronze medalist from the 2006 World Volleyball Championship; Bronze medalist from the World Cup in Japan in 2007 Bronze medalist from the European in Turkey in 2009; Silver and bronze medalist of the Champions League with Dinamo; Gold Medal of the Champions League with Zenit (Kazan) in 2015, 2016, 2017
- Teodor Todorov – Pleyer in Bulgaria men's national volleyball team;

== Managers and Coaches ==
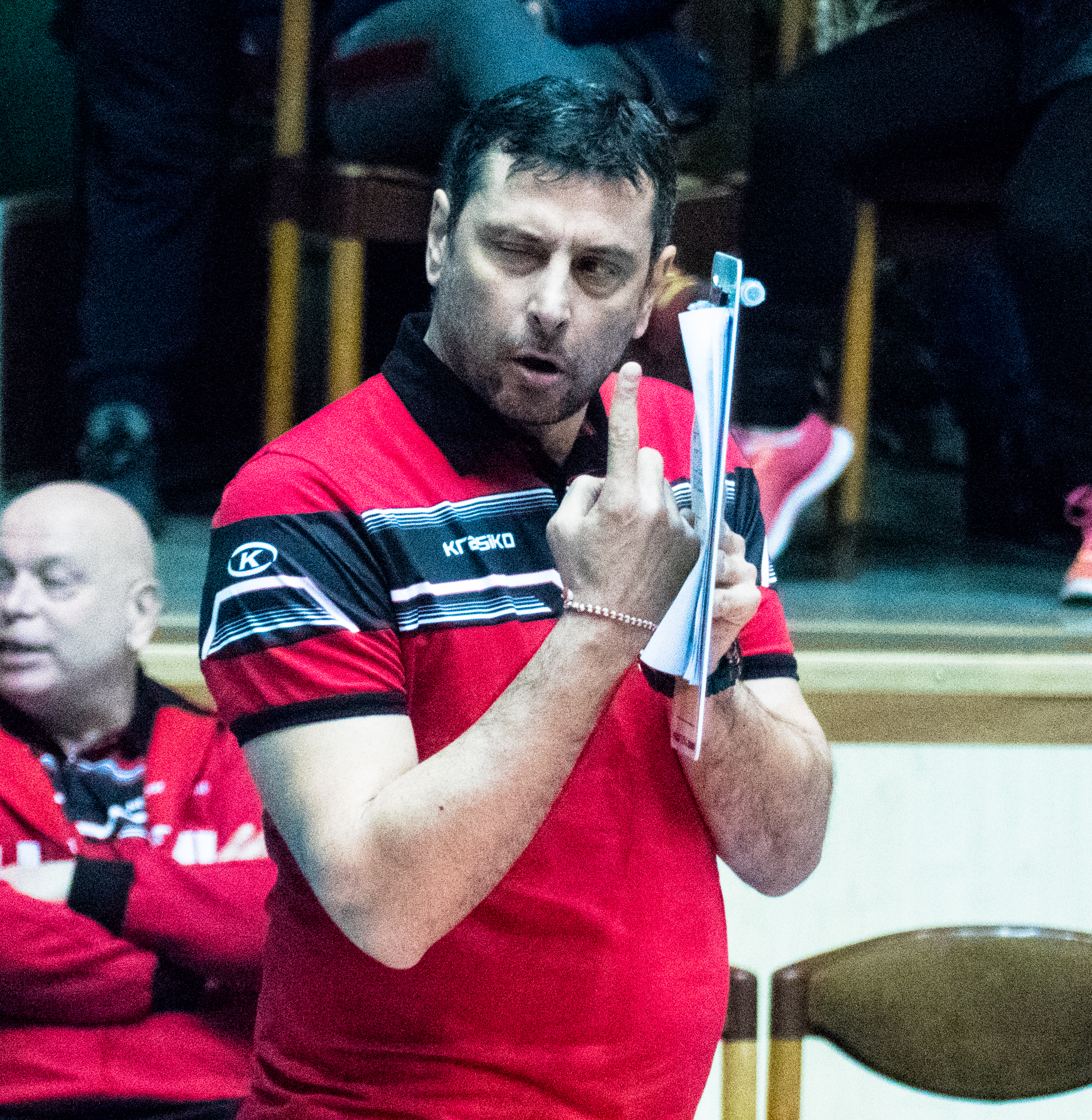
Nikolay Jeliazkov is a coach since 2019.

=== Directors ===
- Alexander Vezenkov – Director of Lukoil Sports Bulgaria
- (Bulgaria) Ognyan Tomov – Chairman
- (Bulgaria) Teodor Salparov – Sport Director

=== Coaches ===
- (Bulgaria) Nikolay Jeliazkov – coach
- (Bulgaria) Tedy Dremizov – coach (assistant)
