= Bulgarian Volleyball League =

Sports league in Bulgaria

- Current season, competition or edition: 2024–25 Bulgarian Volleyball League
- Sport: Volleyball
- Founded: 1945
- First season: 1945
- Administrator: BVF
- No. of teams: 12
- Country: Bulgaria
- Continent: Europe
- Most recent champion: Levski Sofia (16) (2023–24)
- Most titles: CSKA Sofia (29)
- Broadcaster: Nova Broadcasting Group / Max Sport
- Level on pyramid: 1
- Relegation to: 2nd League
- Domestic cups: Bulgarian Cup; Bulgarian Super Cup
- International cups: CEV Champions League; CEV Cup; CEV Challenge Cup

Bulgarian Men's Volleyball League is a men's volleyball competition organized by the Bulgarian Volleyball Federation (БФВ) that was created in 1945.

== Title holders ==
Years	Champions	Runners-up	Third place
1945	Levski-Lozenetz, Sofia	Ticha-Vladislav'45	
1946	Chavdar Sofia (1)		
1947	Chavdar Pazardzhik (1)		
1948	Septemvri pri CDV		
1949	CDNA Sofia		
1950	Spartak Sofia		
1951	Spartak Sofia	Slavia Sofia	
1952	Udarnik Sofia		
1953	Udarnik Sofia		
1954	VC Minyor Pernik		Slavia Sofia
1955	VC Minyor Pernik		Slavia Sofia
1956	Udarnik Sofia (3)		
1957	CDNA Sofia	Slavia Sofia	
1958	CDNA Sofia		
1959	Levski Sofia		
1960	VC Minyor Pernik		
1961	VC Minyor Pernik		
1962	CDNA Sofia		
1963	VC Minyor Pernik		
1964	VC Minyor Pernik		
1965	VC Minyor Pernik (7)		
1966	Akademik Sofia (1)		
1967	Spartak Sofia (3)		
1968	CSKA Sofia		
1969	CSKA Sofia		
1970	CSKA Sofia	Slavia Sofia	
1971	CSKA Sofia		Slavia Sofia
1972	CSKA Sofia		Slavia Sofia
1973	CSKA Sofia	Slavia Sofia	
1974	Slavia Sofia		
1975	Slavia Sofia		
1976	CSKA Sofia	Slavia Sofia	
1977	CSKA Sofia	Slavia Sofia	
1978	CSKA Sofia		Slavia Sofia
1979	Slavia Sofia	CSKA Sofia	Levski-Spartak Sofia
1980	Levski-Spartak Sofia		
1981	CSKA Sofia		
1982	CSKA Sofia		
1983	CSKA Sofia		Slavia Sofia
1984	CSKA Sofia		
1985	Levski-Spartak Sofia		Slavia Sofia
1986	CSKA Sofia	Slavia Sofia	
1987	CSKA Sofia		Slavia Sofia
1988	CSKA Sofia		Slavia Sofia
1989	CSKA Sofia		
1990	CSKA Sofia		Slavia Sofia
1991	Georesurs Buhovo (1)		
1992	Levski Sofia		
1993	CSKA Sofia		
1994	CSKA Sofia		Slavia Sofia
1995	CSKA Sofia	Slavia Sofia	
1996	Slavia Sofia (5)		
1997	Levski Sofia		
1998	Slavia Sofia		Cherno More BASK
1999	Levski Sofia	Slavia Sofia	
2000	Levski Sofia		
2001	Levski Sofia		Cherno More BASK
2002	Levski Sofia		
2003	Levski Sofia		
2004	Levski Sofia		
2005	Levski Sofia		Slavia Sofia
2006	Levski Sofia		
2007	Volley Neftohimik	Levski Sofia	Marek Dupnitsa; Pirin Blagoevgrad
2008	CSKA Sofia	Volley Neftohimik	Levski Sofia; Marek Dupnitsa
2009	Levski Sofia (15)	CSKA Sofia	Volley Neftohimik
2010	CSKA Sofia	Volley Neftohimik	Levski Sofia
2011	CSKA Sofia (29)	Pirin Razlog	Volley Neftohimik
2012	Marek Dupnitsa	Pirin Razlog	CSKA Sofia
2013	Marek Dupnitsa	KVK Gabrovo	Levski Sofia
2014	Marek Dupnitsa	KVK Gabrovo	Levski Sofia
2014 / 15	Marek Dupnitsa (4)	Volley Dobrudzha	Volley Montana
2015 / 16	Volley Dobrudzha (1)	Volley Neftohimik	Volley Montana
2016 / 17	Volley Neftohimik	CSKA Sofia	Volley Montana
2017 / 18	Volley Neftohimik	Volley Montana	CSKA Sofia
2018 / 19	Volley Neftohimik	Hebar Pazardzhik	CSKA Sofia
2019 / 20	Volley Neftohimik (5)	Hebar Pazardzhik	Volley Dobrudzha
2020 / 21	Hebar Pazardzhik	Volley Neftohimik	Levski Sofia
2021 / 22	Hebar Pazardzhik (2)	Volley Neftohimik	Montana
2022 / 23	Volley Neftohimik (6)	Hebar Pazardzhik	
2023 / 24	Levski Sofia (16)	CSKA Sofia	
2024 / 25	Levski Sofia (17)	Lokomotiv Plovdiv	
2025 / 26	Levski Sofia (18)	Volley Neftohimik	

== Titles by club ==
Club	Winners	Winning years
CSKA Sofia	29	1948, 1949, 1957, 1958, 1962, 1968, 1969, 1970, 1971, 1972, 1973, 1976, 1977, 1978, 1981, 1982, 1983, 1984, 1986, 1987, 1988, 1989, 1990, 1993, 1994, 1995, 2008, 2010, 2011
Levski Sofia	18	1945, 1959, 1980, 1985, 1992, 1997, 1999, 2000, 2001, 2002, 2003, 2004, 2005, 2006, 2009, 2024, 2025, 2026
Minyor Pernik	7	1954, 1955, 1960, 1961, 1963, 1964, 1965
Neftochimic	6	2007, 2017, 2018, 2019, 2020, 2023
Slavia Sofia	5	1974, 1975, 1979, 1996, 1998
Marek Dupnitsa	4	2012, 2013, 2014, 2015
Spartak Sofia	3	1950, 1951, 1967
Udarnik Sofia	3	1952, 1953, 1956
Hebar Pazardzhik	2	2021, 2022
Chavdar Sofia	1	1946
Chavdar Pazardzhik	1	1947
Akademik Sofia	1	1966
Georesurs Buhovo	1	1991
Dobrudzha	1	2016

== See also ==
- Bulgarian Women's Volleyball League
