= VC Minyor Pernik =

VC Minyor Pernik is a Bulgarian volleyball club, section of the multi-sports club Minyor Pernik, based in Pernik.

== History ==
The club founded in 1919.

The golden era of the club was from the mid 50s to mid 60s where Minyor Pernik won seven championships and two cups in domestic competitions and also the 1964-65 season was finalist of the CEV European Champions Cup.

== Honours ==
men's team

Bulgarian League

- Winners (7): 1954, 1955, 1960, 1961, 1963, 1964, 1965

Bulgarian Cup

- Winners (3): 1954, 1955, 1975

CEV Champions League

- Runners-up (1): 1964-65

women's team

Bulgarian League

- Winners (4): 1949, 1953, 1956, 1960

Bulgarian Cup

- Winners (2): 1955, 1975
