= VC CSKA Sofia =

Professional volleyball team based in Sofia, Bulgaria

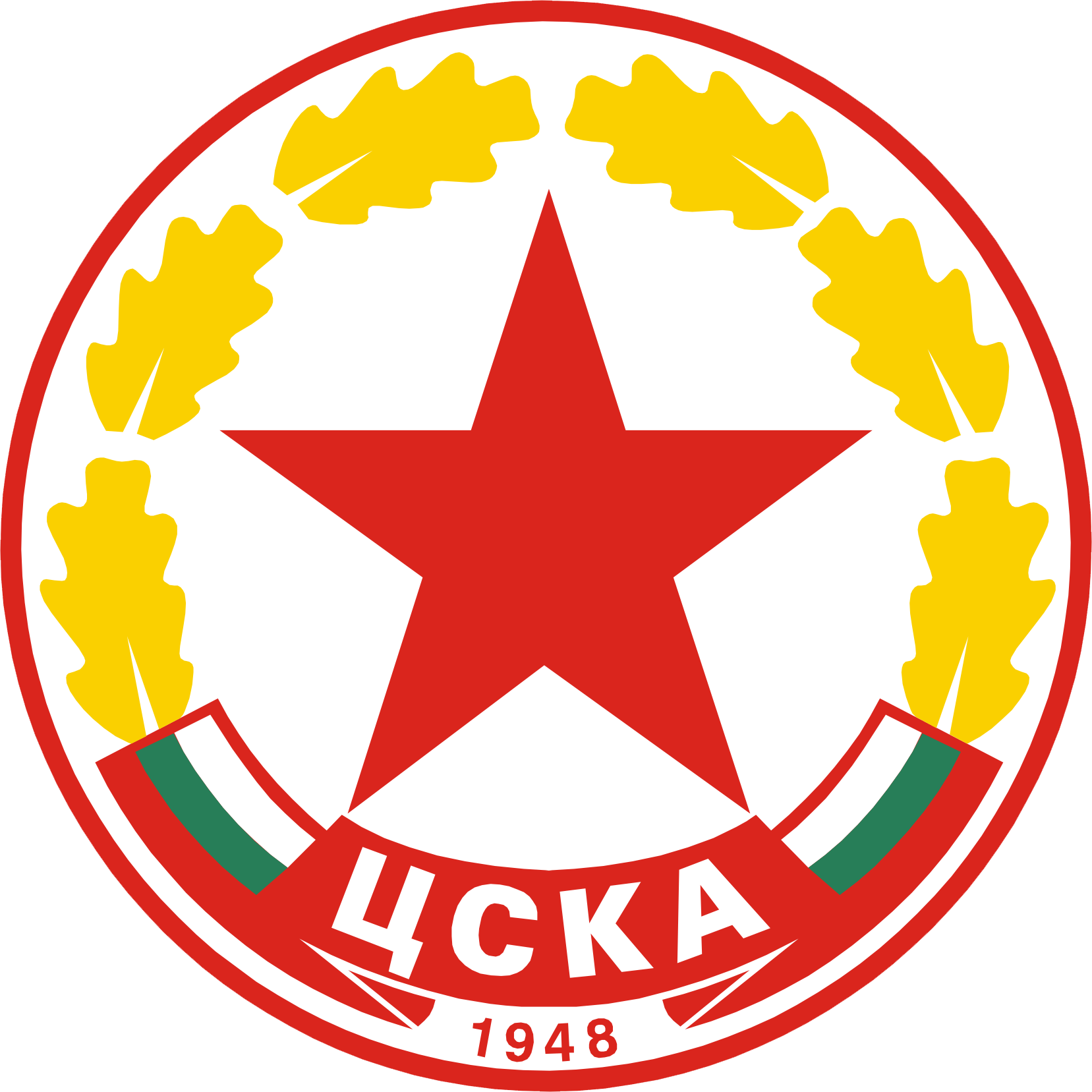
- Full name: Volleyball club "CSKA Sofia"
- Short name: CSKA Sofia
- Nickname: "The Army Men" "The Reds"
- Founded: 5 May 1948
- Ground: Vasil Simov Hall (Capacity: 1000)
- Chairman: Alexandar Popov
- Manager: Alexandar Popov
- League: Bulgarian Volleyball Super League
- 2025/26: 4th
- Website: Club home page

Uniforms
Home	Away

VC CSKA Sofia is a professional volleyball team based in Sofia, Bulgaria, competing in the Bulgarian Volleyball League.

On 5 May 1948 establishing a sports club "September at CDV" which incorporates seven club sports, including volleyball. His successor is consistent volleyball teams CDNV, CDNA, CSKA "Cherveno zname", CSKA "Septemvriysko zname" CSKA and again that in the period 1948 – 2022 г. won 29 titles in men and 22 for women and 19 cups Bulgaria in men and 19 in women. Abbreviation Club "CSKA" means "Central Sports Club of the Army".

In the year of his championship winning team and laid the foundations of volleyball VC CSKA, Kostadin Shopov (player-coach of the team), Dragomir Stoyanov, Dimitar Dimitrov, Dimitar Elenkov, Konstantin Totev, Ivan Ivanov, Dimitar Dimitrov, Peter Shishkov, Alexander Velev Milko Karaivanov (then coach of the male and female trimmings).

For several decades CSKA established itself as a brand name for professional success in the field of volleyball, known both nationally and globally.

CSKA's men's volleyball team won the European Cup in 1969 and 1976. The 1969 title title was the first European club championship won by a Bulgarian men's team in a team sport. The achievement contributed to the growing popularity of volleyball in Bulgaria and coincided with the development of the sport nationally. The following year, Bulgaria hosted the 1970 FIVB Volleyball Men's World Championship, where the Bulgarian national team finished as runners up. Dimitar Zlatanov was named the tournament's best player.

European awards for women in the period 1979 – 1984 years. (1979 Cup, 1984 Cup Winners' Cup in 1982) raised the prestige of the women's division in the club and start a serious domination of the domestic championship, CSKA in the 1980s. Among other successes CSKA during 1978 – 1980, were the prelude and the European Cup of Bulgaria from the European Championships in Sofia during 1981.

Over the years, the club has contributed to several generations of volleyball players that have become well known in Bulgarian volleyball. These include E. Zlatanov (won eight titles), Ivan Ivanov, D. Karov, Ivan Seferinov, Ivan Nikolov (won eight league titles as a player and five championships as head coach of CSKA Sofia), Borislav Kiossev (won most titles – 9), Lyubo Ganev, N. Ivanov, V. Todorov, Aleksandar Popov, K. Todorov and many others. Other people with the red team include: M. Mineva, M. Stoeva, R. Kaisheva, E. Shahanova, T. Bozhurina, V. Stoyanova, V. Nikolova, P. Natova, E. Pashova, M. Kyoseva, C. Haralampieva, Desislava Nikodimova and Elitsa Nikodimova, A. Zetova, N. Marinova, V. Borisova and others.

This was a major milestone to the development of VC CSKA by coaching staffs. The coaches had promoted the VC to other people, leading to the growth of CSKA. Family Shahanova, Dimitar Dimitrov, Milko Karaivanov, Vasil Simov, Ivan Nikolov, Dimitar Karov, Maria Mineva, Verka Nikolova, Stefan Hristov, Alexandar Popov, Atanas Petrov, Katia Marashlieva had been introduced to the club this way. Shahanova created a generation Stoeva, Stoyanova, Kaisheva. Vasil Simov it further developed, laying the groundwork for the development of a new group of players like Pashova, Haralampieva, Desislava Nikodimova, Mila Kyoseva, Boneva and others. For men, he found and built major Bulgarian volleyball players such as: Ivan Nikolov, Borislav Kyosev, Stefan Sokolov, Stefan Petrov, Stoyan Gunchev, Petko Petkov and others. Ivan Nikolov had also coached consecutive school talent from CSKA – Elitsa Nikodimova, Antonina Zetova, Yulia Ivanova, Neli Marinova, Valya Ivanova, Larisa Simeonova, Petia Popov.

== Honours ==
Men

- NVL 29 times (record):
  - 1948, 1949, 1957, 1958, 1962, 1968, 1969, 1970, 1971, 1972, 1973, 1976, 1977, 1978, 1981, 1982, 1983, 1984, 1986, 1987, 1988, 1989, 1990, 1993, 1994, 1995, 2008, 2010, 2011
- Bulgarian Cup 19 times (record):
  - 1967, 1969, 1970, 1973, 1979, 1981, 1982, 1984, 1985, 1986, 1988, 1990, 1991, 1992, 1993, 2002, 2009, 2010, 2011
- CEV Champions League Winners:
  - 1969
- CEV Champions League "Final Four" Participant:
  - 1963 (1/2 final), 1971 (1/2 final)
  - 1977 (3-rd), 1985 (3-rd)
  - 1987 (4-th), 1988 (4-th), 1990 (4-th)
- Cup Winner's Cup Winners:
  - 1976
- Cup Winner's Cup "Final Four" Participant:
  - 1986 (3-rd)
  - 1981 (4-th)
- CEV Cup "Final Four" Participant:
  - 2011 (1/2 final)

Women

- NVL 22 times:
  - 1978, 1979, 1982, 1983, 1985, 1986, 1987, 1988, 1989, 1991, 1992, 1993, 1995, 2000, 2004, 2005, 2007, 2008, 2010, 2011, 2012, 2013
- Bulgarian Cup 19 times:
  - 1969, 1976, 1979, 1981, 1982, 1983, 1985, 1986, 1988, 1989, 1993, 1995, 1996, 2000, 2004, 2008, 2010, 2011, 2013
- CEV Champions League Winners:
  - 1979, 1984
- CEV Champions League "Final Four" Participant:
  - 1988 (4-th), 1989 (4-th)
- Cup Winner's Cup Winners:
  - 1982
- Cup Winner's Cup "Final Four" Participant:
  - 1973 (2-nd), 1976 (2-nd), 1991 (2-nd)
  - 1981 (3-rd)
  - 1977 (4-th)
- BVA Cup
- 2026 (2-nd)

== VC CSKA in Europe – Total statistics ==
Competition	S	P	W	L	Best ranking
CEV Men's Champions League	22	127	58	69	(1969)
Men's CEV Cup	12	50	28	22	(1976)
CEV Men's Challenge Cup	8	23	8	15	Eighth-finals (2025)
CEV Women's Champions League	11	55	29	26	(1979,1984)
Women's CEV Cup	6	33	24	9	(1982)
CEV Women's Challenge Cup	4	16	8	8	Eighth-finals (1995)
Men's	38	200	94	106	5 European trophies
Women's	21	104	61	43	5 European trophies
Total	59	304	155	149	5 European trophies

== VC CSKA Sofia in European Volleyball ==
CEV European Champions Cup / CEV Champions League
Season	Round	Club	Home	Away	Aggregate
1962-63	Eighth-finals	(East Germany) Rotation Leipzig	3-0	2-3	5-3
1962-63	Quarter-finals	(Hungary) Dosza Ujpest	3-2	2-3	5-5 (129-117)
1962-63	Semi-finals	(Soviet Union) CSKA Moscow	2-3	0-3	2-6
1968-69	Eighth-finals	(Albania) Dinamo Tirana	3-0	3-1	6-1
1968-69	Quarter-finals	(Poland) AZS AWF Warszawa	3-0	1-3	4-3
1968-69	Semi-finals	(East Germany) SC Leipzig	3-1	3-1	6-2
1968-69	Final	(Romania) Steaua Bucuresti	3-0	3-2	6-2
1970-71	Eighth-finals	(Hungary) Czepel Budapest	3-0	0-3	3-3 (78-63)
1970-71	Quarter-finals	(Soviet Union) CSKA Moscow	3-1	1-3	4-4 (102-97)
1970-71	Semi-finals	(Czech Republic) Zetor Zbrojovka Brno	3-1	1-3	4-4 (87-102)
1971-72	Eighth-finals	(Finland) Ruolainen Kanastus	3-0	3-0	6-0
1971-72	Group stage (A)	(Belgium) Rebels Liers	1-3		4th place
1971-72	Group stage (A)	(Albania) Dinamo Tirana	2-3		4th place
1971-72	Group stage (A)	(Netherlands) AMVJ Deltalloyd Amsterdam	1-3		4th place
1972-73	Preliminary round	(Socialist Federal Republic of Yugoslavia) GIK Banat Zrenjanin	3-1	3-1	6-2
1972-73	Eighth-finals	(Hungary) Dosza Ujpest	3-0	0-3	3-3 (74-75)
1973-74	Preliminary round	(Greece) Panathinakos Athens	3-0	-	3-0
1973-74	Eighth-finals	(Czech Republic) Dukla Liberec	3-0	1-3	4-3
1973-74	Group stage (A)	(Soviet Union) CSKA Moscow	0-3		3rd place
1973-74	Group stage (A)	(East Germany) SC Leipzig	1-3		3rd place
1973-74	Group stage (A)	(Italy) Ruini Firenze	3-0		3rd place
1976-77	Eighth-finals	(France) VGA Saint Maure	3-1	3-2	6-3
1976-77	Quarter-finals	(Poland) AZS Olstyn	3-0	2-3	5-3
1976-77	Final Four	(Socialist Federal Republic of Yugoslavia) Vardar Skopje	3-2		3rd place
1976-77	Final Four	(Romania) Dinamo București	0-3		3rd place
1976-77	Final Four	(Soviet Union) CSKA Moscow	0-3		3rd place
1978-79	Preliminary round	(Greece) Olympiakos Piraeus	3-0	1-3	4-3
1978-79	Eighth-finals	(Italy) Paoletti Catania	3-0	0-3	3-3 (68-67)
1978-79	Quarter-finals	(Czech Republic) Cervena Hviezda Bratislava	0-3	0-3	0-6
1981-82	Eighth-finals	(Romania) Dinamo București	3-0	0-3	3-3 (69-76)
1983-84	Eighth-finals	(Italy) Santal Parma	3-1	1-3	4-4 (97-98)
1984-85	Preliminary round	(Albania) Dinamo Tirana	3-0	3-0	6-0
1984-85	Eighth-finals	(England) Capital City Spikers	3-0	3-0	6-0
1984-85	Quarter-finals	(Finland) Loimu 79 Turku	3-0	3-0	6-0
1984-85	Final Four	(Czech Republic) Rudá Hvězda Praha	3-0		3rd place
1984-85	Final Four	(Socialist Federal Republic of Yugoslavia) Mladost Zagrzeb	1-3		3rd place
1984-85	Final Four	(Italy) Santal Parma	2-3		3rd place
1986-87	Preliminary round	(Portugal) FC Porto	3-0	3-0	6-0
1986-87	Eighth-finals	(Socialist Federal Republic of Yugoslavia) Mladost Zagrzeb	3-0	2-3	5-3
1986-87	Quarter-finals	(Czech Republic) Rudá Hvězda Praha	3-0	1-3	4-3
1986-87	Final Four	(Italy) Panini Modena	2-3		4th place
1986-87	Final Four	(Netherlands) Brother Martinus Amstelveen	1-3		4th place
1986-87	Final Four	(Soviet Union) CSKA Moscow	0-3		4th place
1987-88	Eighth-finals	(Czech Republic) Aero Odolena Voda	3-0	2-3	5-3
1987-88	Quarter-finals	(Switzerland) VBC Leysin	3-0	3-1	6-1
1987-88	Final Four	(Soviet Union) CSKA Moscow	Preliminary round		0-3
1987-88	Final Four	(Italy) Panini Modena	Semi-finals		2-3
1987-88	Final Four	(Netherlands) Brother Martinus Amstelveen	Third place play-off		0-3/ 4th place
1988-89	Eighth-finals	(Norway) Ulriken Bergen	3-0	3-2	6-2
1988-89	Group stage (B)	(Greece) Olympiakos Piraeus	3-0	0-3	4th place
1988-89	Group stage (B)	(Socialist Federal Republic of Yugoslavia) Vojvodina Novi Sad	3-1	0-3	4th place
1988-89	Group stage (B)	(Soviet Union) CSKA Moscow	2-3	0-3	4th place
1989-90	Eighth-finals	(Greece) Olympiakos Piraeus	3-1	3-2	6-3
1989-90	Group stage (B)	(Czech Republic) Rudá Hvězda Praha	3-1	3-1	2nd place
1989-90	Group stage (B)	(Socialist Federal Republic of Yugoslavia) Vojvodina Novi Sad	3-1	0-3	2nd place
1989-90	Group stage (B)	(Spain) CV Palma	3-2	2-3	2nd place
1989-90	Semi-finals	(Italy) Philips Modena	0-3		
1989-90	Third place play-off	(Spain) CV Palma	2-3		
1990-91	Second round	(Germany) Bayer Leverkusen	2-3	0-3	2-6
1993-94	First round	(Russia) Avtomobilist Saint Petersburg	0-3	0-3	0-6
1994-95	First round	(Latvia) Vildoga Muranija Riga	1-3	0-3	1-6
2008–09	Main Phase, Group A	(Greece) Iraklis Thessaloniki	0-3	0-3	4th place
2008–09	Main Phase, Group A	(Turkey) Fenerbahçe İstanbul	1-3	2-3	4th place
2008–09	Main Phase, Group A	(Poland) AZS Częstochowa	1-3	0-3	4th place
2009–10	League round, Group B	(Russia) Zenit Kazan	3-1	1-3	2nd place
2009–10	League round, Group B	(France) Tours VB	3-2	0-3	2nd place
2009–10	League round, Group B	(Spain) Unicaja Almeria	3-2	0-3	2nd place
2009–10	Playoffs 12	(Poland) Asseco Resovia	1-3	0-3	1-6
2010–11	League round, Group A	(Germany) Generali Unterhaching	3-2	0-3	3rd place
2010–11	League round, Group A	(France) AS Cannes	3-2	2-3	3rd place
2010–11	League round, Group A	(Russia) Zenit Kazan	3-2	0-3	3rd place
2011–12	League round, Group A	(Turkey) Arkas Izmir	0-3	1-3	4th place
2011–12	League round, Group A	(Greece) Iraklis Thessaloniki	0-3	1-3	4th place
2011–12	League round, Group A	(Belgium) Noliko Maaseik	2-3	1-3	4th place

CEV Cup Winners' Cup / CEV Top Teams Cup / CEV Cup
Season	Round	Club	Home	Away	Aggregate
1975-76	Eighth-finals	(West Germany) SS Fortuna Bonn	3-0	3-1	6-1
1975-76	Group stage (B)	(Turkey) Sigorta Ankara	3-0		1st place
1975-76	Group stage (B)	Racing Club de France	3-0		1st place
1975-76	Group stage (B)	(Netherlands) Bouwlust Orawi	3-0		1st place
1975-76	Final Four	(Czech Republic) Cervena Hviezda Bratislava	3-1		1st place
1975-76	Final Four	(Italy) Klippan Torino	3-1		1st place
1975-76	Final Four	(Netherlands) Bouwlust Orawi	3-0		1st place
1980-81	Preliminary round	(Spain) Vallhermoso	3-0	-	3-0
1980-81	Eighth-finals	(Italy) Panini Modena	3-0	2-3	5-3
1980-81	Quarter-finals	(Belgium) Ibis Courtrai	3-0	3-0	6-0
1980-81	Final Four	(Romania) Steaua Bucuresti	0-3		4th place
1980-81	Final Four	(Czech Republic) Cervena Hviezda Bratislava	0-3		4th place
1980-81	Final Four	(Russia) Avtomobilist Saint Petersburg	0-3		4th place
1985-86	Eighth-finals	(Finland) NMKY Pieksamaen	3-0	3-2	6-2
1985-86	Quarter-finals	(West Germany) Bayer Leverkusen	3-0	3-0	6-0
1985-86	Final Four	(Italy) Panini Modena	3-1		3rd place
1985-86	Final Four	(Romania) Steaua Bucuresti	2-3		3rd place
1985-86	Final Four	(Soviet Union) Dinamo Moscow	0-3		3rd place
1991-92	Eighth-finals	(Greece) Panathinakos Athens	3-0	0-3	3-3 (74-81)
1992-93	Second round	(Romania) Elcond Zalau	3-0	0-3	3-3 (73-65)
1992-93	Eighth-finals	(Italy) Mediolanum Gonzaga Milano	0-3	2-3	2-6
2000-01	Group stage, group D	(Russia) Izumrud Ekaterinburg	3-0	0-3	2nd place
2000-01	Group stage, group D	(Switzerland) TV Amriswil	3-0	3-1	2nd place
2000-01	Group stage, group D	(Croatia) Mladost Zagreb	3-2	2-3	2nd place
2001-02	Preliminary round	(Romania) Dinamo Bucuresti	2-3	0-3	2-6
2002-03	Group stage, Group 6	(Latvia) Ozolnieki Poliurs	3-0		2nd place
2002-03	Group stage, Group 6	(Bosnia and Herzegovina) Napredak Odzak	3-0		2nd place
2002-03	Group stage, Group 6	(North Macedonia) Rabotnicki Fersped Skopje	1-3		2nd place
2010–11	Challenge phase	(Turkey) Ziraat Bankası Ankara	3-2	0-3 (19-17)	3-5 (19-17)
2010–11	Semi-finals	(Poland) ZAKSA Kędzierzyn-Koźle	3-0	0-3 (12-15)	3-3 (12-15)
2012–13	1/16 Finals	(Italy) Andreoli Latina	0-3	1-3	1-6
2016–17	1/16 Finals	(Switzerland) Volley Amriswil	3-1	1-3 (8-15)	4-4 (8-15)
2017–18	1/16 Finals	(Russia) Belogorie Belgorod	0-3	0-3	0-6

CEV Challenge Cup (CEV Cup)
Season	Round	Club	Home	Away	Aggregate
2001-02	Preliminary round	(Israel) Maccabi Tel Aviv	3-1	3-0	6-1
2001-02	Group stage, Group 8	(Turkey) Erdemirspor	2-3		2nd place
2001-02	Group stage, Group 8	(Denmark) Holte IF	3-0		2nd place
2001-02	Group stage, Group 8	(Bosnia and Herzegovina) OK Sinpos Sarajevo	3-0		2nd place
2002-03	Group stage, Group 9	(Netherlands) Alcom Capelle	3-2		4th place
2002-03	Group stage, Group 9	(Russia) Iskra Odintsovo	0-3		4th place
2002-03	Group stage, Group 9	(Poland) Hefra Gwardia Wrocław	0-3		4th place
2006-07	Group stage, Group 9	(Serbia) Crvena Zvezda	3-1		3rd place
2006-07	Group stage, Group 9	(Turkey) İstanbul Büyükşehir	0-3		3rd place
2006-07	Group stage, Group 9	(Poland) PZU AZS Olstyn	1-3		3rd place
2012–13	1/16 Finals	(Czech Republic) Dukla Liberec	0-3	0-3	0-6
2014–15	Second round	(Belarus) Stroitel Minsk	1-3	0-3	1-6
2018–19	1/16 Finals	(Belgium) Volley Haasrode Leuven	1-3	0-3	0-6
2024-25	1/16 Finals	(Ukraine) Epicentr-Podoliany	1-3 (17-15)	3-1	3-3 (17-15)
2024-25	Eighth-finals	(Belgium) Decospan VT Menen	2-3	2-3	2-4
2026-27	First round	(Ukraine) Epicentr-Podoliany	3-1	2-3	1-1 (16-14)
2026-27	1/16 Finals	(Bulgaria) Lokomotiv Plovdiv			

== Women's VC CSKA Sofia in European Volleyball ==
CEV Champions Cup / CEV Champions League
Season	Round	Club	Home	Away	Aggregate
1978-79	Preliminary round	(Portugal) Leixões Porto	3-0	3-0	6-0
1978-79	Eighth-finals	(Sweden) Sollentuna Stockholm	3-0	3-0	6-0
1978-79	Quarter-finals	(Poland) Czarni Słupsk	3-1	3-1	6-2
1978-79	Final Four	(Hungary) NIM SE Budapest	3-0		1st place
1978-79	Final Four	(East Germany) SC Dynamo Berlin	1-3		1st place
1978-79	Final Four	(Czech Republic) Slávia Bratislava	3-0		1st place
1983-84	Eighth-finals	(Netherlands) DVC Dokkum	3-0	3-1	6-1
1983-84	Quarter-finals	(Austria) Tirol Innsbruck	3-0	3-0	6-0
1983-84	Final Four	(Italy) Olimpia Ravenna	3-0		1st place
1983-84	Final Four	(Turkey) Eczacıbaşı	3-1		1st place
1983-84	Final Four	(West Germany) SV Lohhof	3-0		1st place
1984-85	Eighth-finals	(Belgium) Dilbeek-Itterbeek	3-1	3-2	6-3
1984-85	Quarter-finals	(Soviet Union) ADK Alma-Ata	0-3	1-3	1-6
1985-86	Eighth-finals	(Italy) Olimpia Ravenna	2-3	1-3	3-6
1986-87	Preliminary round	(Slovenia) Paloma Branik Maribor	3-0	3-1	6-1
1986-87	Eighth-finals	(Sweden) Sollentuna Stockholm	-	3-1	3-1
1986-87	Quarter-finals	(East Germany) SC Dynamo Berlin	0-3	0-3	0-6
1987-88	Eighth-finals	(Socialist Federal Republic of Yugoslavia) Mladost Monter Zagreb	3-0	3-0	6-0
1987-88	Quarter-finals	(West Germany) Bayern Lohhof	3-0	0-3	3-3 (66-64)
1987-88	Final Four	(Italy) Olimpia Ravenna	Preliminary round		0-3
1987-88	Final Four	(Soviet Union) Uralochka Sverdlovsk	Semi-finals		0-3
1987-88	Final Four	(East Germany) SC Dynamo Berlin	Third place play-off		0-3/ 4th place
1888-89	Eighth-finals	(West Germany) Bayern Lohhof	3-0	1-3	4-3
1888-89	Quarter-finals	(Netherlands) Sneek Avero OS	3-0	1-3	4-3
1888-89	Final Four	(Italy) Teodora Olimpia Ravenna	Preliminary round		2-3
1888-89	Final Four	(Soviet Union) Uralochka Sverdlovsk	Semi-finals		0-3
1888-89	Final Four	(East Germany) SC Dynamo Berlin	Third place play-off		1-3/ 4th place
1889-90	Eighth-finals	(Czechoslovakia) Slavia UK Bratislava	3-0	1-3	4-3
1889-90	Quarter-finals	(France) Racing CF Paris	2-3	1-3	3-6
1991-92	Eighth-finals	(Italy) Olimpia Teodora Ravenna	0-3	0-3	0-6
1992-93	Second round	(Greece) Panathinaikos Athens	3-1	3-2	6-3
1992-93	Eighth-finals	(Italy) Parmalat Matera	0-3	0-3	0-6
1993-94	First round	(Turkey) Gunes Sigorta Istanbul	3-0	1-3	4-3
1993-94	Second round	(Netherlands) Bonduelle Vught	2-3	0-3	2-6

CEV Cup Winners' Cup / CEV Cup
Season	Round	Club	Home	Away	Aggregate
1972-73	Quarter-finals	(Italy) La Tore Reggio Emilia	3-0	3-0	6-0
1972-73	Final Four	(Poland) Wisla Krakow	3-0		2nd place
1972-73	Final Four	(Soviet Union) CSKA Moscow	0-3		2nd place
1972-73	Final Four	(Romania) Penicilina Iasi	3-0		2nd place
1975-76	Quarter-finals	(Austria) Innsbrucker AC	-	-	-
1975-76	Final Four	(Czechoslovakia) Slavia Bratislava	0-3		2nd place
1975-76	Final Four	(West Germany) US Medico Munster	3-0		2nd place
1975-76	Final Four	(France) ASU Lyon	3-0		2nd place
1976-77	Eighth-finals	(Hungary) Vasas Budapest	3-1	-	3-1
1976-77	Quarter-finals	(Austria) Rapid Wien	3-0	3-1	6-1
1976-77	Final Four	(Soviet Union) Iskra Voroshilovgrad	0-3		4th place
1976-77	Final Four	(East Germany) SC Dynamo Berlin	1-3		4th place
1976-77	Final Four	(Hungary) Ujpesti Dozsa	2-3		4th place
1980-81	Eighth-finals	(East Germany) SC Dynamo Berlin	3-0	3-2	6-2
1980-81	Quarter-finals	(Hungary) Ujpesti Dozsa	-	-	-
1980-81	Final Four	(Italy) Olimpia Teodora Ravenna	3-0		3rd place
1980-81	Final Four	(Hungary) Vasas Izzo Budapest	0-3		3rd place
1980-81	Final Four	(Soviet Union) Spartak Leningrad	1-3		3rd place
1981-82	Eighth-finals	(Italy) Reggio Emilia	3-0	3-1	6-1
1981-82	Quarter-finals	(Switzerland) Uni Lausanne	3-0	3-0	6-0
1981-82	Final Four	(Czechoslovakia) Slavia Bratislava	3-2		1st place
1981-82	Final Four	(Netherlands) Starlift Voorberg	3-1		1st place
1981-82	Final Four	(Soviet Union) Dynamo Moscow	3-1		1st place
1990-91	Eighth-finals	(Austria) Wüstenrot Salzburg	3-1	3-1	6-2
1990-91	Quarter-finals	(Italy) Volley Modena	3-0	1-3	4-3
1990-91	Final Four	(Germany) Bayern Lohhof	Preliminary round		3-1
1990-91	Final Four	(Soviet Union) TTU Leningrad	Semi-finals		3-2
1990-91	Final Four	(Soviet Union) ADK Alma-Ata	Final		2-3

CEV Challenge Cup (CEV Cup)
Season	Round	Club	Home	Away	Aggregate
1994-95	First round	(Slovenia) Avtohit Bled	3-0	3-0	6-0
1994-95	Second round	(Soviet Union) Spartak Omsk	3-0	3-1	6-1
1994-95	Eighth-finals	(Soviet Union) Orbita Zaporozhye	0-3	2-3	2-6
2008-09	First round	(Finland) Konecranes Hämeenlinna	3-1	3-1	6-2
2008-09	Second round	(Belarus) Kommunalnik Mogilev	2-3	1-3	3-6
2010-11	Second round	(Cyprus) Trb da Noi AEL Limassol	3-0	3-2	6-2
2010-11	1/16 Finals	(Czech Republic) Kralovo Pole Brno	2-3	0-3	2-6
2024-25	First round	(Greece) Panathinaikos Athens	1-3	0-3	0-6

BVA Cup
Season	Round	Club	Result	Aggregate
2026	Round-robin stage	(Greece) Olympiakos Piraeus	0-3	2nd place
2026	Round-robin stage	(North Macedonia) Nakovski Volley Strumica	3-1	2nd place
2026	Round-robin stage	(Kosovo) Drita Gjilan	3-1	2nd place

== Season by season ==
Men's
Season	Division	Pos	Cup	SC	European competitions
1948	NVL	1st	-	-	-
1949	NVL	1st	-	-	-
1950	NVL	3rd	-	-	-
1951	NVL	5th	-	-	-
1952	NVL	5th	-	-	-
1953	NVL	4th	-	-	-
1954	NVL	2nd	-	-	-
1955	NVL	2nd	4th	-	-
1956	NVL	3rd		-	-
1957	NVL	1st		-	-
1958	NVL	1st	-	-	-
1959	NVL	4th		-	-
1960	NVL	4th		-	-
1960/61	NVL	3rd		-	-
1961/62	NVL	1st	-	-	-
1962/63	NVL	5th	-	-	European Cup - Semi-finals
1963/64	NVL	2nd	-	-	-
1964/65	NVL	5th	-	-	-
1965/66	NVL	4th		-	-
1966/67	NVL	2nd	W	-	-
1967/68	NVL	1st		-	-
1968/69	NVL	1st	W	-	European Cup - Champions
1969/70	NVL	1st	W	-	-
1970/71	NVL	1st		-	European Cup - Semi-finals
1971/72	NVL	1st		-	European Cup - Group stage
1972/73	NVL	1st	W	-	European Cup - Eighth-finals
1973/74	NVL	2nd		-	European Cup - Group stage
1974/75	NVL	2nd		-	-
1975/76	NVL	1st		-	Cup Winners' Cup - Champions
1976/77	NVL	1st		-	European Cup - Final Four, 3rd place
1977/78	NVL	1st	2nd	-	-
1978/79	NVL	2nd	W	-	European Cup - Quarter-finals
1979/80	NVL	3rd	2nd	-	-
1980/81	NVL	1st	W	-	Cup Winners' Cup - Final Four, 4th place
1981/82	NVL	1st	W	-	European Cup - Eighth-finals
1982/83	NVL	1st		-	-
1983/84	NVL	1st	W	-	European Cup - Group stage
1984/85	NVL	2nd	W	-	European Cup - Final Four, 3rd place
1985/86	NVL	1st	W	-	Cup Winners' Cup - Final Four, 3rd place
1986/87	NVL	1st	2nd	-	European Cup - Final Four, 4th place
1987/88	NVL	1st	W	-	European Cup - Final Four, 4th place
1988/89	NVL	1st		-	European Cup - Group stage
1989/90	NVL	1st	W	-	European Cup - Semi-finals, 4th place
1990/91	NVL	2nd	W	-	European Cup - Second round
1991/92	NVL	2nd	W	-	Cup Winners' Cup - Eighth-finals
1992/93	NVL	1st	W	-	Cup Winners' Cup - Eighth-finals
1993/94	NVL	1st		-	European Cup - First round
1994/95	NVL	1st		-	European Cup - First round
1995/96	NVL	2nd		-	-
1996/97	NVL	3rd		-	-
1997/98	NVL			-	-
1998/99	NVL	3rd		-	-
1999/00	NVL	2nd	F	-	-
2000/01	NVL	2nd	F	-	CEV Top Teams Cup - Group stage
2001/02	NVL	2nd	W	-	CEV Top Teams Cup - Preliminary round
2001/02	NVL	2nd	W	-	CEV Cup (Challenge) - Group stage
2002/03	NVL	4th	SF	-	CEV Top Teams Cup - Group stage
2002/03	NVL	4th	SF	-	CEV Cup (Challenge) - Group stage
2003/04	NVL	4th		-	-
2004/05	NVL			-	-
2005/06	NVL			-	-
2006/07	NVL			-	CEV Cup (Challenge) - Group stage
2007/08	NVL	1st	F	-	-
2008/09	NVL	2nd	W	-	Champions League - League round
2009/10	NVL	1st	W	-	Champions League - Playoffs 12
2010/11	NVL	1st	W	-	Champions League - League round
2010/11	NVL	1st	W	-	CEV Cup - Semi-final
2011/12	NVL	4th	SF	-	Champions League - League round
2012/13	NVL	6th	F	-	CEV Cup - 1/16 Final
2012/13	NVL	6th	F	-	Challenge Cup - 1/16 Final
2013/14	NVL	5th	QF	-	-
2014/15	NVL	4th	PR	-	Challenge Cup - Second round
2015/16	NVL	7th	PR	-	-
2016/17	NVL	2nd	SF	-	CEV Cup - 1/16 Final
2017/18	NVL	3rd	QF	-	CEV Cup - 1/16 Final
2018/19	NVL	3rd	QF	-	Challenge Cup - 1/16 Final
2019/20	NVL	8th	1/8	-	-
2020/21	NVL	7th	QF	-	-
2021/22	NVL	7th	QF	-	-
2022/23	NVL	5th	QF	-	-
2023/24	NVL	2nd	SF	-	-
2024/25	NVL	6th	QF	SF	Challenge Cup - Eighth-finals
2025/26	NVL	4th	SF	-	-
2026/27	NVL			SF	Challenge Cup -

Women's
Season	Division	Pos	Cup	European competitions
1948	NVL	4th	-	-
1949	NVL	DNQ	-	-
1950	NVL	5th	-	-
1951	NVL	4th	-	-
1952	NVL	5th	-	-
1953	NVL		-	-
1954	NVL		4th	-
1963/64	NVL	5th	-	-
1964/65	NVL	5th	-	-
1965/66	NVL	4th		-
1966/67	NVL	5th		-
1967/68	NVL	3rd		-
1968/69	NVL	3rd	W	-
1969/70	NVL	4th		-
1970/71	NVL	4th		-
1971/72	NVL	4th	2nd	-
1972/73	NVL	2nd	2nd	Cup Winners' Cup - Final Four, 2nd place
1973/74	NVL	3rd		-
1974/75	NVL	2nd		-
1975/76	NVL	3rd	W	Cup Winners' Cup - Final Four, 2nd place
1976/77	NVL	2nd		Cup Winners' Cup - Final Four, 4th place
1977/78	NVL	1st		-
1978/79	NVL	1st	W	European Cup - Champions
1979/80	NVL	2nd	2nd	-
1980/81	NVL	2nd	W	Cup Winners' Cup - Final Four, 3rd place
1981/82	NVL	1st	W	Cup Winners' Cup - Champions
1982/83	NVL	1st	W	-
1983/84	NVL	3rd	6th	European Cup - Champions
1984/85	NVL	1st	W	European Cup - Quarter-finals
1985/86	NVL	1st	W	European Cup - Eighth-finals
1986/87	NVL	1st		European Cup - Quarter-finals
1987/88	NVL	1st	W	European Cup - Final Four, 4th place
1988/89	NVL	1st	W	European Cup - Final Four, 4th place
1989/90	NVL	2nd		European Cup - Quarter-finals
1990/91	NVL	1st		Cup Winners' Cup - Final
1991/92	NVL	1st		European Cup - Eighth-finals
1992/93	NVL	1st	W	European Cup - Eighth-finals
1993/94	NVL	3rd		European Cup - Second round
1994/95	NVL	1st	W	CEV Cup (Challenge) - Eighth-finals
1995/96	NVL	2nd	W	-
1996/97	NVL	3rd		-
1997/98	NVL	3rd		-
1998/99	NVL	2nd		-
1999/00	NVL	1st	W	-
2000/01	NVL	2nd	3rd	-
2001/02	NVL	2nd	F	-
2002/03	NVL	2nd	F	-
2003/04	NVL	1st	W	-
2004/05	NVL	1st	F	-
2005/06	NVL	3rd	F	-
2006/07	NVL	1st	SF	-
2007/08	NVL	1st	W	-
2008/09	NVL	3rd	F	Challenge Cup - Second round
2009/10	NVL	1st	W	-
2010/11	NVL	1st	W	Challenge Cup - 1/16 Final
2011/12	NVL	1st	SF	-
2012/13	NVL	1st	W	-
2013/14	NVL	2nd	F	-
2014/15	NVL	3rd	SF	-
2015/16	NVL	4th	SF	-
2016/17	NVL	3rd	SF	-
2017/18	NVL	3rd	SF	-
2018/19	NVL	5th	SF	-
2019/20	NVL	3rd	QF	-
2020/21	NVL	3rd	F	-
2021/22	NVL	2nd	SF	-
2022/23	NVL	2nd	F	-
2023/24	NVL	2nd	F	-
2024/25	NVL	3rd	QF	Challenge Cup - First round
2025/26	NVL	3rd	SF	-
2026/27	NVL			BVA Cup - 2nd place

== Team (Men's) ==
Team roster – season 2023/2024

No.	Name	Date of birth	Position
1	(Bulgaria) Stoyko Nenchev	November 25, 1984 (age 41)	Middle blocker
2	(Bulgaria) Aleksandar Simeonov	6 January 1986 (age 40)	Wing Spiker
3	(Bulgaria) Ivan Cholev	February 29, 1996 (age 30)	Opposite
4	(Bulgaria) Hristiyan Velikov	June 20, 2003 (age 23)	Wing Spiker
5	(Bulgaria) Delcho Raev	May 11, 1990 (age 36)	Setter
6	(Bulgaria) Valentin Peychev	January 27, 2000 (age 26)	Libero
7	(Bulgaria) Lyubomir Zlatkov	May 22, 2006 (age 20)	Wing Spiker
8	(Bulgaria) Vladimir Stankov	August 9, 1996 (age 30)	Setter
9	(Bulgaria) Ivaylo Stefanov	July 19, 1973 (age 53)	Wing Spiker
10	(Bulgaria) Todor Kostov	March 6, 1996 (age 30)	Middle blocker
11	(Bulgaria) Ivan Kolev	January 2, 1987 (age 39)	Wing Spiker
12	(Serbia) Strahinja Brzakovic	April 28, 1998 (age 28)	Opposite
13	(Bulgaria) Martin Bozhilov	April 11, 1988 (age 38)	Libero
14	(Croatia) Ivan Mihalj	23 November 1990 (age 35)	Middle Blocker
15	(Bulgaria) Krasimir Mitev	July 20, 2003 (age 23)	Middle blocker
16	(Bulgaria) Todor Valchev	January 18, 1989 (age 37)	Wing Spiker
17	(Cuba) Jorge Garcia	March 31, 1991 (age 35)	Wing Spiker
18	(Bulgaria) Kristiyan Andreev	April 23, 2006 (age 20)	Wing Spiker
19	(Bulgaria) Simeon Aleksandrov	18 February 1988 (age 38)	Wing Spiker
21	(Bulgaria) Evan Georgiev	16 July 2008 (age 18)	Middle Blocker
Head coach: (Bulgaria) Alexandar Popov; Assistant: (Bulgaria) Ivaylo Stefanov

Team roster - season 2022/2023
No.	Name	Date of birth	Position
1	(Bulgaria) Metodi Ananiev	17 February 1986	Wing Spiker
2	(Bulgaria) Aleksandar Simeonov	6 January 1986	Wing Spiker
3	(Bulgaria) Ivan Cholev	29 February 1996	Opposite
4	(Bulgaria) Hristiyan Velikov	20 June 2003	Wing Spiker
5	(Bulgaria) Delcho Raev	11 May 1990	Setter
6	(Bulgaria) Valentin Peychev	27 January 2000	Libero
7	(Bulgaria) Andrey Hristov	27 March 2001	Middle Blocker
8	(Bulgaria) Vladimir Stankov	9 August 1996	Setter
9	(Bulgaria) Ivaylo Stefanov	19 July 1973	Wing Spiker
10	(Bulgaria) Todor Kostov	6 March 1996	Middle Blocker
11	(Bulgaria) Ivan Kolev	2 January 1987	Wing Spiker
12	(Bulgaria) Dobromir Ivanov	11 February 1988	Libero
13	(Bulgaria) Dimitar Dimitrov	11 December 2000	Opposite
14	(Croatia) Ivan Mihalj	23 November 1990	Middle Blocker
16	(Bulgaria) Viktor Kadikov	21 October 2004	Middle Blocker
19	(Bulgaria) Simeon Aleksandrov	18 February 1988	Wing Spiker
Head coach: (Bulgaria) Alexandar Popov; Assistant: (Bulgaria) Ivaylo Stefanov

== Team (Women's) ==
Team roster – season 2023/2024

No.	Name	Date of birth	Position
1	(Bulgaria) Emileta Racheva	26 November 1998 (age 27)	Wing Spiker
2	(Bulgaria) Aleksandra Kostadinova	1 July 2003 (age 23)	Wing Spiker
3	(Bulgaria) Boyana Boyanova	13 December 2006 (age 19)	Setter
4	(Bulgaria) Monika Todorova	23 March 2002 (age 24)	Setter
5	(Bulgaria) Rayna Stoycheva	3 June 2005 (age 21)	Middle Blocker
7	(Bulgaria) Kaya Nikolova	28 October 2006 (age 20)	Middle Blocker
8	(Bulgaria) Dimana Ivanova	1 December 2007 (age 18)	Setter
9	(Bulgaria) Aleksandra Peycheva	28 January 2006 (age 20)	Wing Spiker
10	(Bulgaria) Aleksandra Saykova	22 July 2003 (age 23)	Middle Blocker
11	(Bulgaria) Ivana Efremova	12 February 2004 (age 22)	Middle Blocker
12	(Bulgaria) Viktoriya Dimitrova	12 July 2005 (age 21)	Opposite
13	(Bulgaria) Mariya Zlatanova	16 November 2006 (age 20)	Wing Spiker
14	(Bulgaria) Ivaila Evlogieva	16 April 2004 (age 22)	Libero
15	(Estonia) Melissa Varlõgina	19 April 1999 (age 27)	Setter
18	(Bulgaria) Eva Kamenska	2 September 2006 (age 20)	Middle Blocker
19	(Bulgaria) Raya Evlogieva	15 September 2006 (age 20)	Opposite
21	(Bulgaria) Viktoriya Ninova	9 November 2007 (age 19)	Libero
Head coach: (Bulgaria) Yulia Ivanova-Mincheva; Assistant: (Bulgaria) Antonina Zetova

Team roster - season 2022/2023
No.	Name	Date of birth	Position
1	(Bulgaria) Raina Stoicheva	3 June 2005	Middle Blocker
2	(Bulgaria) Aleksandra Kostadinova	1 July 2003	Wing Spiker
3	(Bulgaria) Patrisiya Choleva	8 March 1991	Wing Spiker
4	(Bulgaria) Monika Todorova	23 March 2002	Setter
5	(Bulgaria) Dariya Ivanova	2 April 2003	Wing Spiker
6	(Bulgaria) Radoslava Ivanova	28 September 2006	Middle Blocker
7	(Bulgaria) Kaya Nikolova	28 October 2006	Middle Blocker
8	(Bulgaria) Dimana Ivanova	1 December 2007	Setter
9	(Bulgaria) Aleksandra Peycheva	28 January 2006	Wing Spiker
10	(Bulgaria) Aleksandra Saykova	22 July 2003	Middle Blocker
11	(Bulgaria) Ivana Efremova	12 February 2004	Middle Blocker
12	(Bulgaria) Viktoriya Dimitrova	12 July 2005	Opposite
13	(Bulgaria) Mariya Zlatanova	16 November 2006	Wing Spiker
14	(Bulgaria) Ivaila Evlogieva	16 April 2004	Libero
15	(Bulgaria) Yoanna Atanasova	24 July 2003	Wing Spiker
15	(Bulgaria) Mariya Buchkova	22 July 2004	Wing Spiker
17	(Bulgaria) Sasha Ilcheva	18 May 2004	Setter
19	(Bulgaria) Raya Evlogieva	15 September 2006	Opposite
21	(Bulgaria) Viktoriya Ninova	9 November 2007	Libero
Head coach: (Bulgaria) Yulia Ivanova-Mincheva; Assistant: (Bulgaria) Antonina Zetova
