= VC Cherno More =

Cherno More BASK
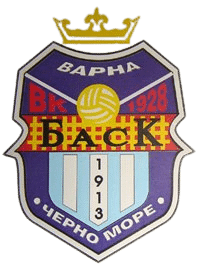
- Full name: VC Cherno More BASK
- Nickname: The Sailors (Моряците)
- Founded: 1996; 30 years ago (1928; 98 years ago)
- Ground: Hristo Borisov (Capacity: 1,000)
- Owner: Krasimir Iliev
- Manager: Viktor Yosifov
- League: NVL
- Website: Club home page

VC Cherno More BASK (Bulgarian: ВК Черно море БАСК) is a professional Bulgarian volleyball team based in Varna. The team is playing in the Bulgarian Volleyball League. Founded in 1996, the team plays its home games at the Hristo Borsiov Hall.

== Honours ==
Bulgarian Volleyball League

- Runners-up (1): (1946)
- Third Place (2): (1998, 2001)

Bulgarian Cup

- Third Place (1): (2006)
