= Bulgaria men's national volleyball team =

Men's national volleyball team representing Bulgaria

Bulgaria
- Nickname(s): Лъвовете (The Lions)
- Association: Bulgarian Volleyball Federation (BVF)
- Confederation: CEV
- Head coach: Gianlorenzo Blengini
- FIVB ranking: 9 (1 October 2026)

Uniforms
Home	Away	Third

Summer Olympics
- Appearances: 8 (First in 1964)
- Best result: (1980)

World Championship
- Appearances: 20 (First in 1949)
- Best result: (1970, 2025)

World Cup
- Appearances: 4 (First in 1965)
- Best result: (2007)

European Championship
- Appearances: 28 (First in 1950)
- Best result: (1951)
- www.bvf.bg (in Bulgarian)
Honours
Event	1st	2nd	3rd
Olympic Games	0	1	0
World Championship	0	2	4
World Cup	0	0	1
European Championship	0	1	4
European Games	0	1	0
Total	0	5	9
Medal record
Olympic Games
Silver medal – second place	1980 Moscow	Team
World Championship
Silver medal – second place	1970 Bulgaria	Team
Silver medal – second place	2025 Philippines	Team
Bronze medal – third place	1949 Czechoslovakia	Team
Bronze medal – third place	1952 Soviet Union	Team
Bronze medal – third place	1986 France	Team
Bronze medal – third place	2006 Japan	Team
World Cup
Bronze medal – third place	2007 Japan	Team
European Championship
Silver medal – second place	1951 France	
Bronze medal – third place	1955 Romania	
Bronze medal – third place	1981 Bulgaria	
Bronze medal – third place	1983 East Germany	
Bronze medal – third place	2009 Turkey	Team
European Games
Silver medal – second place	2015 Baku	Team

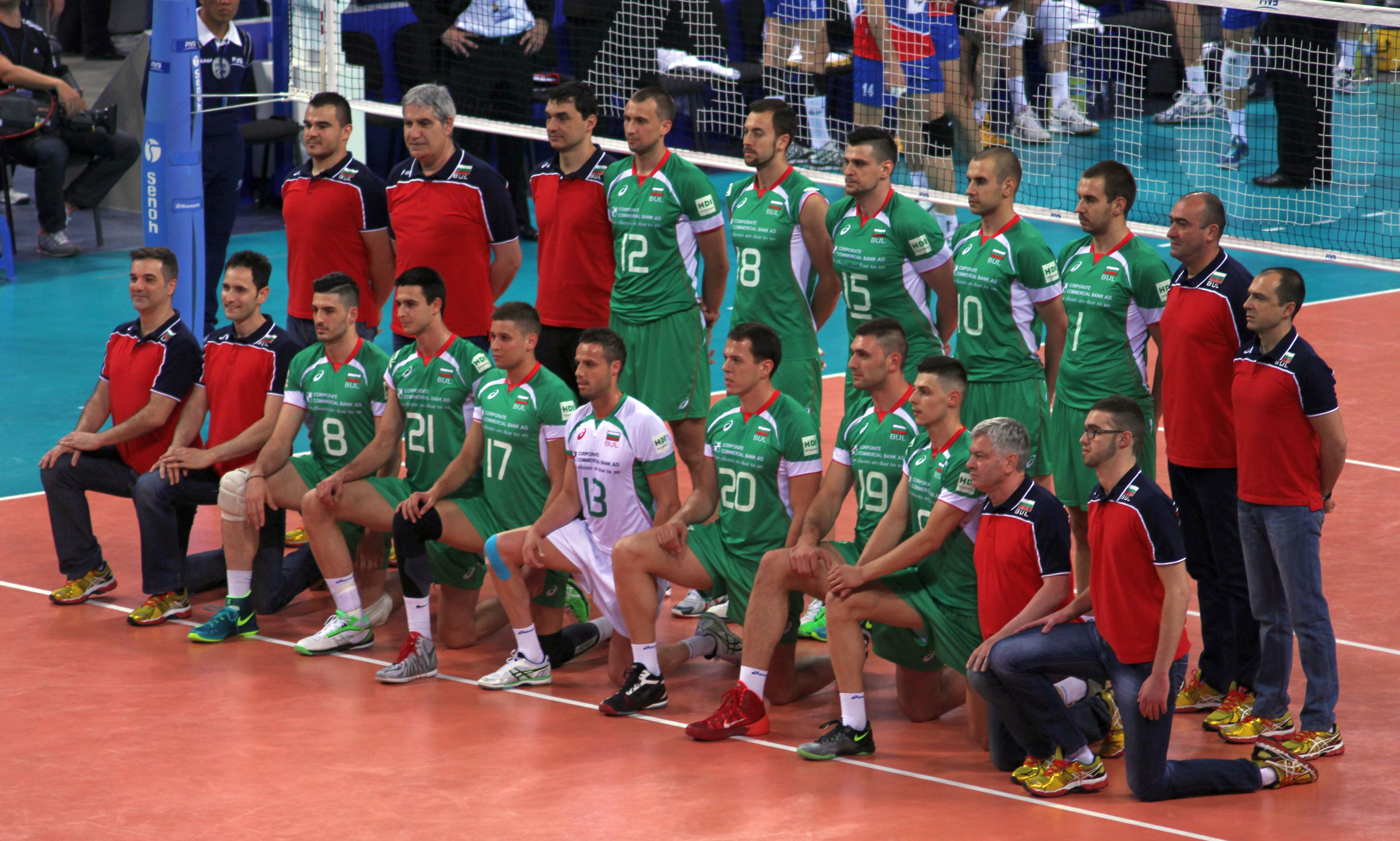
The Bulgaria National Team in 2014

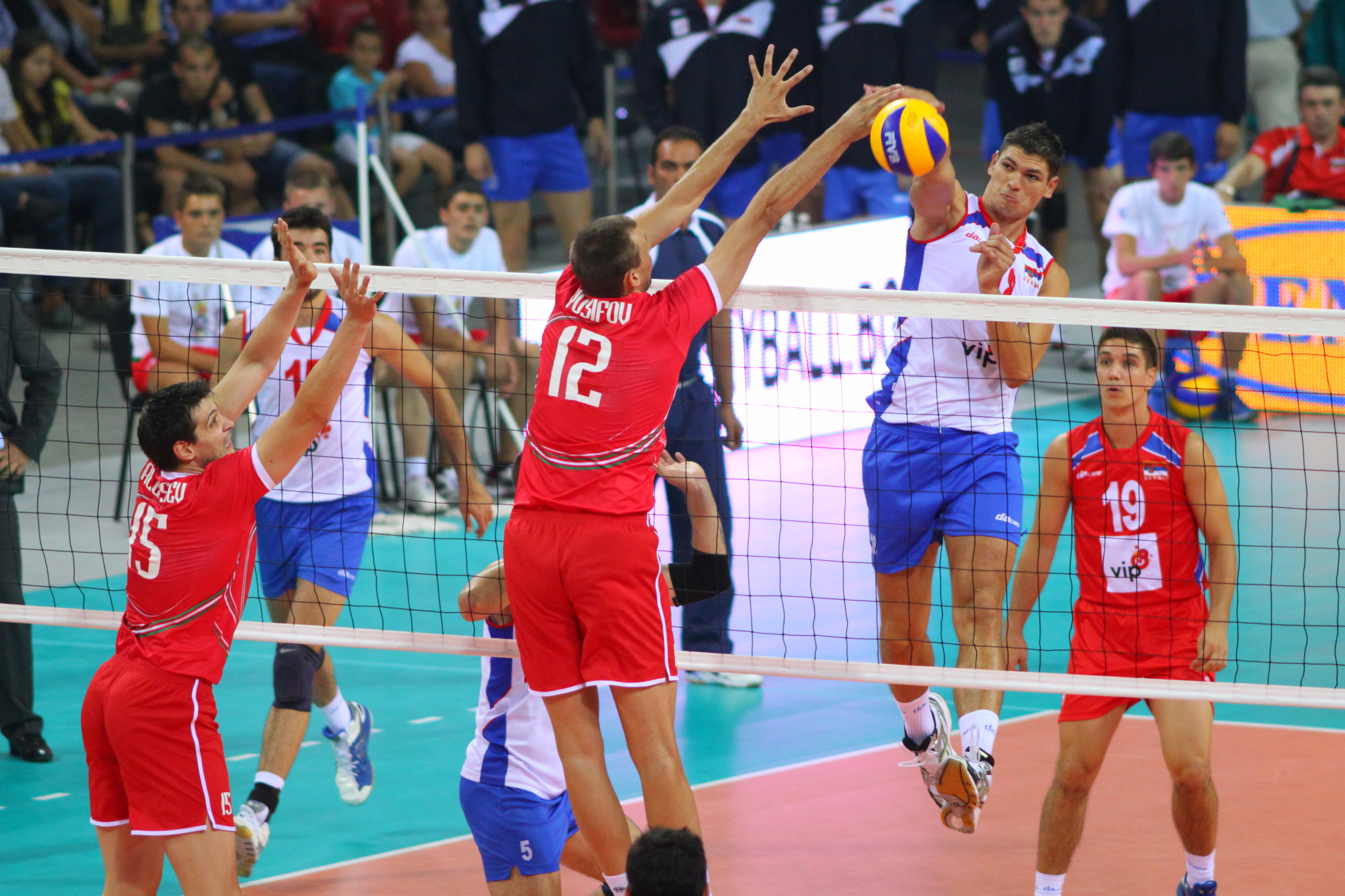
Bulgaria Defeating Powerful Rivals Serbia in 2011

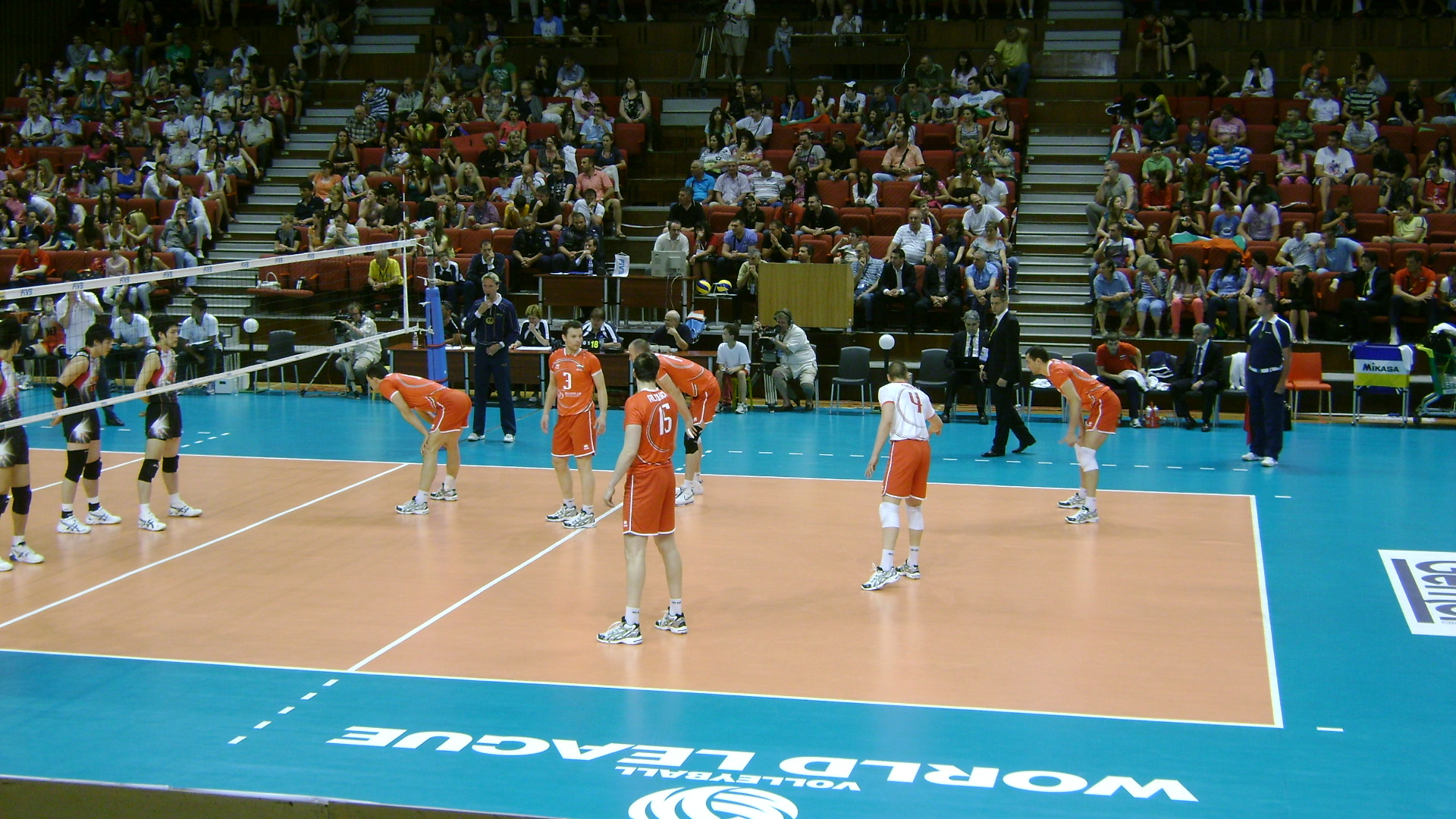
The Bulgaria National Team at the 2011 FIVB World League Defeating Asian Giants Japan

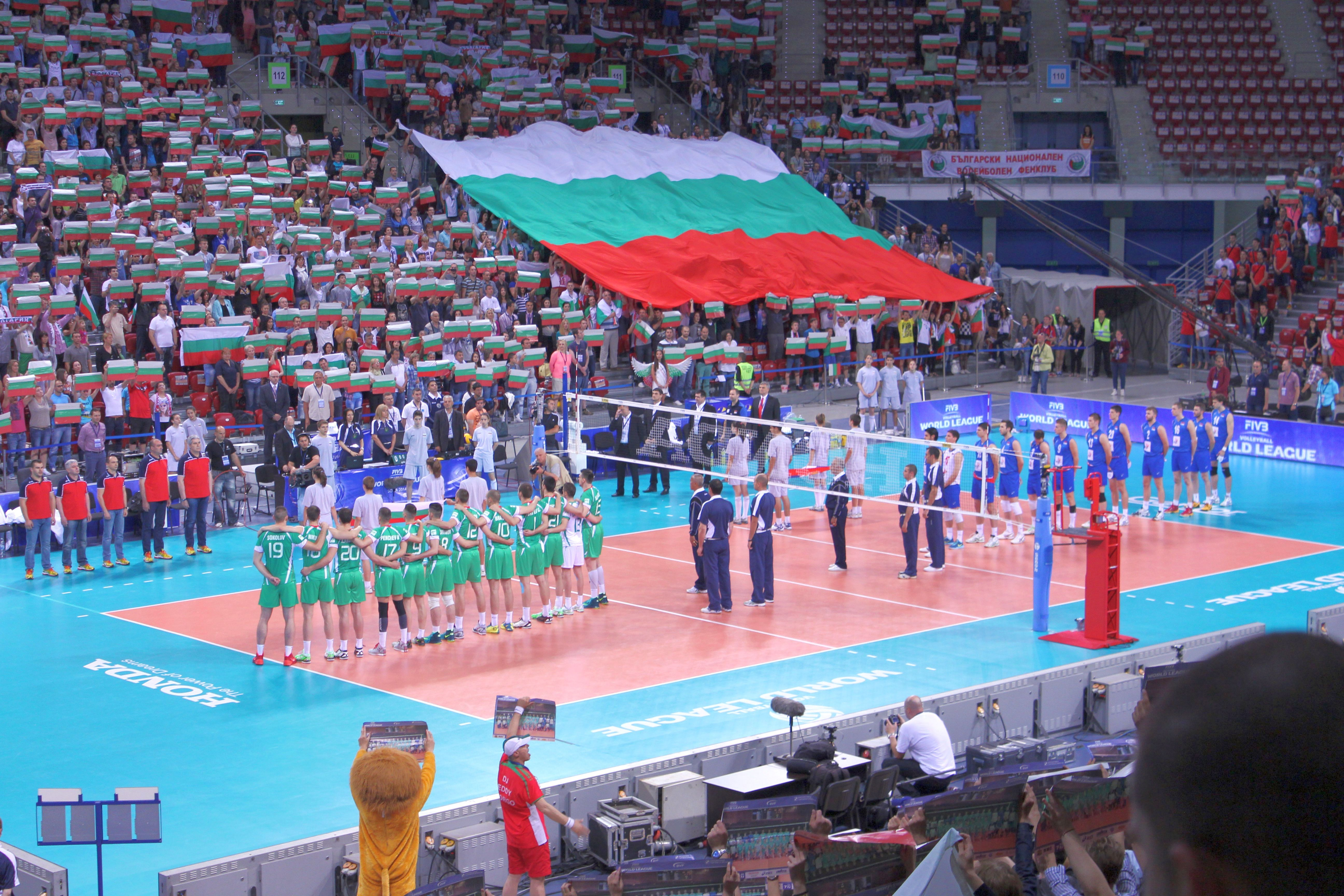
Bulgaria and Serbia Match in 2014

The Bulgaria men's national volleyball team represents the country in international competitions and friendly matches. The national team is controlled by the Bulgarian Volleyball Federation, the governing body for volleyball in Bulgaria.

== History ==
The team's achievements include winning the Balkan Championships in 1980, Runners-Up (1970, 2025), and Third Place (1949, 1952, 1986, 2006) at the World Championship. At the European Championships, Bulgaria has one Runners-Up (1951) and four Third Place (1955, 1981, 1983, 2009) finishes. Bulgaria has also achieved Runners-Up at the 1980 Summer Olympic Games in Moscow. The team has one third place at the World Cup (2007) and five Semi-Final appearances in the World League (1994, 2004, 2006, 2012, 2013). The team's most significant recent results include earning a silver medal at the 2025 World Championship, Third Place at the 2006 World Championship, the 2007 World Cup and 2009 European Championship as well as achieving Runners-Up at the first European Games in 2015.

Bulgaria first took part in the World League in 1994. During the debut season in the tournament, the team went all the way to the semi-finals, led by players like Lubo Ganev, Dimo Tonev, and Martin Stoev. In the next four editions, Bulgaria took part but did not manage to surpass its prior performance by reaching fifth in 1995, eight in 1996, sixth in 1997, and seventh in 1998. Under the guidance of Milorad Kijac, the new wave of players, including Teodor Salparov, Danial Mihaylov, etc., mixed well with the more experienced Evgeni Ivanov, Plamen Konstantinov, Nikolay Ivanov, Vladimir Nikolov, Hristo Tsvetanov to result in the fifth-place rank in 2003. The next year, once again under Kijac, the team played some impressive games and succeeded in tying its best performance of reaching the Semi-Finals. The team included more players from the Under-21 team that the previous year won a medal at the World Championships, such as Matey Kaziyski and Milushev. In 2005 with a new coach, Martin Stoev, the team finished in fifth place, followed by another tied best-ever performance of reaching the Semi-Finals in 2006, and another fifth place in 2007. In 2011, Bulgaria qualified for the first time in the Final Round after four years, and they finished in fifth place. The 2012 Final Round was held in the newly opened Armeets Arena in Sofia, and the host reached the Semi-Finals once again.

== Competition record ==
=== Olympic Games ===
Champions Runners up Third place Fourth place

Olympic Games record
Year	Round	Position	GP	MW	ML	SW	SL	SPW	SPL	Squad
(Japan) 1964	Round robin	5th	9	5	4	20	16	464	429	Squad
(Mexico) 1968	Round robin	6th	9	4	5	16	17	379	385	Squad
(West Germany) 1972	Semifinals	4th	7	4	3	15	14	386	347	Squad
(Canada) 1976	Did not qualify									
(Soviet Union) 1980	Final	2nd	6	4	2	13	8	263	241	Squad
(United States) 1984	Withdrew									
(South Korea) 1988	Final round	6th	7	3	4	10	12	259	270	Squad
(Spain) 1992	Did not qualify									
(United States) 1996	Semifinals	7th	8	4	4	15	16	379	396	Squad
(Australia) 2000	Did not qualify									
(Greece) 2004	Did not qualify									
(China) 2008	Quarterfinals	5th	6	3	3	11	12	527	535	Squad
(United Kingdom) 2012	Semifinals	4th	8	5	3	18	10	653	636	Squad
(Brazil) 2016	Did not qualify									
(Japan) 2020	Did not qualify									
(France) 2024	Did not qualify									
Total	0 Titles	8/16	60	32	28	118	105	3,310	3,239	—

=== World Championship ===
Champions Runners up Third place Fourth place As host

World Championship record
Year	Round	Position	GP	MW	ML	SW	SL	SPW	SPL	Squad
(Czechoslovakia) 1949	Final round	3rd	7	5	2	15	10	293	277	—
(Soviet Union) 1952	Final round	3rd	8	5	3	18	12	407	337	—
(France) 1956	Final round	5th	10	6	4	24	16	538	440	—
(Brazil) 1960	Did not qualify									
(Soviet Union) 1962	Final round	4th	11	8	3	27	19	624	545	—
(Czechoslovakia) 1966	Final round	7th	10	5	5	19	18	470	407	—
(Bulgaria) 1970	Final round	2nd	11	10	1	32	7	547	384	—
(Mexico) 1974	Final round	7th	11	8	3	27	13	562	402	—
(Italy) 1978	Final round	10th	9	5	4	17	17	410	394	—
(Argentina) 1982	Final round	5th	9	6	3	21	14	447	393	—
(France) 1986	Final round	3rd	8	6	2	19	7	346	283	Squad
(Brazil) 1990	Final round	5th	7	3	4	12	16	327	370	Squad
(Greece) 1994	Final round	9th	4	2	2	7	7	164	180	Squad
(Japan) 1998	Final round	7th	12	7	5	23	23	570	594	Squad
(Argentina) 2002	Second round	13th	6	2	4	13	13	588	584	Squad
(Japan) 2006	Final round	3rd	11	9	2	29	14	1,008	937	Squad
(Italy) 2010	Final round	7th	9	5	4	21	13	809	789	Squad
(Poland) 2014	First round	13th	9	3	6	14	20	718	765	Squad
(Italy) (Bulgaria) 2018	Second round	11th	8	4	4	16	12	625	617	Squad
(Poland) (Slovenia) 2022	First round	20th	3	0	3	2	9	228	262	Squad
(Philippines) 2025	Final	2nd	7	6	1	19	8	622	544	Squad
Total	0 Titles	20/21	170	105	65	375	268	10,303	9,504	—

=== World Cup ===
Champions Runners up Third place Fourth place

World Cup record
Year	Round	Position	GP	MW	ML	SW	SL	SPW	SPL	Squad
(Poland) 1965	Final round	9th	6	2	4	11	13	296	292	—
(East Germany) 1969	Final round	4th	6	3	3	12	9	268	229	—
(Japan) 1977	Final round	6th	8	3	5	12	17	311	341	—
(Japan) 1981	Did not qualify									
(Japan) 1985	Did not qualify									
(Japan) 1989	Did not qualify									
(Japan) 1991	Did not qualify									
(Japan) 1995	Did not qualify									
(Japan) 1999	Did not qualify									
(Japan) 2003	Did not qualify									
(Japan) 2007	Fourth round	3rd	11	9	2	29	13	988	881	Squad
(Japan) 2011	Did not qualify									
(Japan) 2015	Did not qualify									
(Japan) 2019	Did not qualify									
Total	0 Titles	4/14	31	17	14	64	52	1,863	1,743	—

=== European Championship ===
Champions Runners up Third place Fourth place As host

European Championship record
Year	Round	Position	GP	MW	ML	SW	SL	SPW	SPL	Squad
(Italy) 1948	Did not qualify									
(Bulgaria) 1950	Round robin	4th	5	2	3	10	10	258	269	—
(France) 1951	Final round	Runners-up	8	6	2	20	9	383	256	—
(Romania) 1955	Final round	Third place	9	5	4	20	16	446	425	—
(Czechoslovakia) 1958	Final round	4th	11	6	5	26	18	571	475	—
(Romania) 1963	Final round	4th	10	7	3	25	12	477	355	—
(Turkey) 1967	Final round	9th	10	7	3	26	11	500	387	—
(Italy) 1971	Final round	7th	8	7	1	23	5	380	254	—
(Socialist Federal Republic of Yugoslavia) 1975	Final round	5th	7	3	4	12	13	310	321	—
(Finland) 1977	Final round	5th	7	4	3	14	9	304	287	—
(France) 1979	Final round	10th	7	2	5	11	19	376	397	—
(Bulgaria) 1981	Final round	Third place	7	4	3	15	13	337	355	—
(East Germany) 1983	Final round	Third place	7	4	3	16	10	338	286	—
(Netherlands) 1985	Final round	5th	7	3	4	12	16	300	358	—
(Belgium) 1987	Final round	11th	7	3	4	12	13	306	302	—
(Sweden) 1989	Final round	6th	7	4	3	16	11	350	298	—
(Germany) 1991	Final round	5th	7	4	3	16	11	364	335	—
(Finland) 1993	Final round	5th	7	4	3	15	13	350	329	—
(Greece) 1995	Final round	4th	7	4	3	12	11	269	282	—
(Netherlands) 1997	Group stage	9th–10th	5	2	3	8	12	219	263	—
(Austria) 1999	Final round	7th	5	2	3	7	9	348	361	—
(Czech Republic) 2001	Final round	6th	7	4	3	16	13	645	643	Squad
(Germany) 2003	Preliminary round	9th	5	2	3	7	11	320	416	—
(Italy) (Serbia and Montenegro) 2005	Did not qualify									
(Russia) 2007	Second round	8th	6	4	2	12	11	519	500	Squad
(Turkey) 2009	Semifinals	Third place	8	6	2	18	10	663	614	Squad
(Austria) (Czech Republic) 2011	Quarterfinals	6th	5	3	2	12	8	466	457	Squad
(Denmark) (Poland) 2013	Semifinals	4th	7	3	4	13	16	667	679	Squad
(Bulgaria) (Italy) 2015	Semifinals	4th	6	4	2	15	10	553	542	Squad
(Poland) 2017	Quarterfinals	6th	5	3	2	9	7	385	349	Squad
(France) (Slovenia) (Belgium) (Netherlands) 2019	Round of 16	11th	6	3	3	11	10	473	494	Squad
(Poland) (Czech Republic) (Estonia) (Finland) 2021	Round of 16	11th	6	3	3	11	12	495	498	Squad
(Italy) (Bulgaria) (North Macedonia) (Israel) 2023	Round of 16	15th	6	2	4	8	14	494	533	Squad
(Bulgaria) (Finland) (Italy) (Romania) 2026	Round of 16	9th	6	4	2	15	9	558	515	Squad
Total	0 Titles	31/33	221	124	97	448	363	12,866	12,320	—

=== World League ===
Champions Runners up Third place Fourth place As host

World League record
Year	Round	Position	GP	MW	ML	SW	SL	SPW	SPL	Squad
(Japan) 1990	Did not qualify									
(Italy) 1991	Did not qualify									
(Italy) 1992	Did not qualify									
(Brazil) 1993	Did not qualify									
(Italy) 1994	Semifinals	4th	16	9	7	32	24	697	653	—
(Brazil) 1995	Final round	5th	16	11	5	34	25	799	730	—
(Netherlands) 1996	Intercontinental	8th	12	4	8	17	25	476	516	—
(Russia) 1997	Final round	6th	16	9	7	35	28	793	740	—
(Italy) 1998	Playoff round	7th	14	10	4	31	21	639	599	—
(Argentina) 1999	Did not qualify									
(Netherlands) 2000	Did not qualify									
(Poland) 2001	Did not qualify									
(Brazil) 2002	Did not qualify									
(Spain) 2003	Final round	5th	15	9	6	36	28	1,443	1,386	—
(Italy) 2004	Semifinals	4th	14	9	5	31	19	1,164	1,100	Squad
(Serbia and Montenegro) 2005	Intercontinental	5th	12	6	6	27	22	1,112	1,067	Squad
(Russia) 2006	Semifinals	4th	17	13	4	42	14	1,340	1,182	Squad
(Poland) 2007	Final round	5th	14	9	5	31	20	1,185	1,109	Squad
(Brazil) 2008	Intercontinental	7th	12	8	4	29	21	1,122	1,105	Squad
(Serbia) 2009	Intercontinental	10th	12	5	7	20	26	1,048	1,084	Squad
(Argentina) 2010	Intercontinental	7th	12	8	4	30	13	1,029	956	Squad
(Poland) 2011	Final round	5th	15	8	7	32	28	1,298	1,287	Squad
(Bulgaria) 2012	Semifinals	4th	16	9	7	33	31	1,411	1,403	Squad
(Argentina) 2013	Semifinals	4th	14	8	6	30	25	1,220	1,251	Squad
(Italy) 2014	Intercontinental	8th	12	1	11	10	35	895	1,059	Squad
(Brazil) 2015	Final round	10th	14	9	5	30	25	1,222	1,226	Squad
(Poland) 2016	Intercontinental	11th	9	1	8	8	26	706	810	Squad
(Brazil) 2017	Intercontinental	9th	9	4	5	16	22	819	861	Squad
Total	0 Titles	20/28	271	150	121	554	478	20,418	20,124	—

=== Nations League ===
Nations League record
Year	Round	Position	GP	MW	ML	SW	SL	SPW	SPL	Squad
(France) 2018	Preliminary	11th	15	6	9	26	34	1,288	1,351	Squad
(United States) 2019	Preliminary	12th	15	5	10	21	38	1,268	1,372	Squad
(Italy) 2020	Cancelled due to COVID-19 pandemic									
(Italy) 2021	Preliminary	15th	15	2	13	11	41	1,037	1,238	Squad
(Italy) 2022	Preliminary	14th	12	2	10	16	31	990	1,087	Squad
(Poland) 2023	Preliminary	15th	12	2	10	13	32	957	1,045	Squad
(Poland) 2024	Preliminary	14th	12	3	9	12	31	900	1,033	Squad
(China) 2025	Preliminary	11th	12	6	6	22	23	993	1,033	Squad
(China) 2026	Preliminary	9th	12	7	5	24	23	1,063	1,039	Squad
Total	0 Titles	8/8	105	33	72	145	253	8,496	9,198	—

=== European Games ===
Champions Runners up Third place Fourth place

European Games record
Year	Round	Position	GP	MW	ML	SW	SL	SPW	SPL	Squad
(Azerbaijan) 2015	Finals	2nd	8	6	2	19	13	737	693	Squad

=== European League ===
Champions Runners up Third place Fourth place As host

European League record
Year	Round	Position	GP	MW	ML	SW	SL	SPW	SPL	Squad
(Czech Republic) 2004	Did not participate									
(Russia) 2005	Did not participate									
(Turkey) 2006	Did not participate									
(Portugal) 2007	Did not participate									
(Turkey) 2008	Did not participate									
(Portugal) 2009	Did not participate									
(Spain) 2010	Did not participate									
(Slovenia) 2011	Did not participate									
(Turkey) 2012	Did not participate									
(Turkey) 2013	Did not participate									
(European Union) 2014	Did not participate									
(Poland) 2015	Did not participate									
(Bulgaria) 2016	Semifinals	4th	8	4	4	16	15	721	660	—
(Denmark) 2017	Did not participate									
(Czech Republic) 2018	Did not participate									
(Estonia) 2019	Did not participate									
(European Union) 2020	Cancelled due to the COVID-19 pandemic									
(Belgium) 2021	Did not participate									
(Croatia) 2022	Did not participate									
(Croatia) 2023	Did not participate									
(Croatia) 2024	Did not participate									
(Czech Republic) 2025	Did not participate									
(European Union) 2026	Did not participate									
Total	0 Titles	1/22	8	4	4	16	15	721	660	—

== Team ==
=== Current squad ===
The following players made the final roster for the 2025 FIVB Men's Volleyball World Championship.

Head coach: (Italy) Gianlorenzo Blengini

Captain: Aleks Grozdanov

No.	Name	Date of birth	Height	Weight	Spike	Block	2025–26 club
1	Simeon Nikolov	24 November 2006	2.09 m (6 ft 10 in)	–	–	–	(Italy) Cucine Lube Civitanova
3	Iliya Petkov	10 October 1996	2.02 m (6 ft 8 in)	–	–	–	(Italy) Yuasa Battery Grottazzolina
4	Martin Atanasov	27 September 1996	1.99 m (6 ft 6 in)	–	–	–	(Italy) Vero Volley Monza
5	Boris Nachev	22 April 2004	2.02 m (6 ft 8 in)	–	–	–	(Italy) Pallavolo Padova
8	Asparuh Asparuhov	28 July 2000	2.00 m (6 ft 7 in)	–	–	–	(Poland) Ślepsk Suwałki
11	Aleks Grozdanov	28 March 1998	2.08 m (6 ft 10 in)	–	–	–	(Poland) LUK Lublin
12	Georgi Tatarov	10 May 2003	2.00 m (6 ft 7 in)	–	–	–	(Italy) Yuasa Battery Grottazzolina
15	Rusi Zhelev	21 December 2001	2.00 m (6 ft 7 in)	–	–	–	(Italy) Pallavolo Macerata
18	Venislav Antov	6 April 2004	1.95 m (6 ft 5 in)	–	–	–	(France) Tourcoing Lille
20	Stoil Palev	21 May 2003	1.88 m (6 ft 2 in)	–	–	–	(Bulgaria) Levski Sofia
21	Dimitar Dobrev	17 July 2008	1.90 m (6 ft 3 in)	–	–	–	(Bulgaria) Levski Sofia
22	Damyan Kolev	11 January 2002	1.77 m (5 ft 10 in)	–	–	–	(Bulgaria) Levski Sofia
23	Aleksandar Nikolov	30 November 2003	2.07 m (6 ft 9 in)	–	–	–	(Italy) Cucine Lube Civitanova
29	Preslav Petkov	28 October 2003	2.08 m (6 ft 10 in)	–	–	–	(Italy) Folgore Massa

=== Head coaches ===
- (Bulgaria) 1949–1950 – Valentin Ankov
- (Bulgaria) 1951–1952 – Dimitar Elenkov
- (Bulgaria) 1952–1955 – Georgi Krastev
- (Bulgaria) 1957–1958 – Dimitar Elenkov
- (Bulgaria) 1964–1971 – Dimitar Gigov
- (Bulgaria) 1971–1972 – Todor Simov
- (Bulgaria) 1979–1980 – Todor Piperkov
- (Bulgaria) 1980–1982 – Tsvetan Pavlov
- (Bulgaria) 1982–1983 – Vasil Simov
- (Bulgaria) 1984–1986 – Bogdan Kyuchukov
- (Bulgaria) 1991–1992 – Georgi Vasilev
- (Bulgaria) 1992–1994 – Stoyan Stoev
- (Bulgaria) 1994–1994 – Brunko Iliev
- (Bulgaria) 1994–1996 – Bogdan Kyuchukov
- (Bulgaria) 1996–1997 – Stefan Sokolov
- (Bulgaria) 1998–1999 – Georgi Vasilev
- (Bulgaria) 1999–2000 – Brunko Iliev
- (Bulgaria) 2000–2002 – Hristo Iliev
- (Bulgaria) 2002–2003 – Assen Galabinov
- (Serbia) 2003–2004 – Milorad Kijac
- (Bulgaria) 2004–2005 – Brunko Iliev
- (Bulgaria) 2005–2008 – Martin Stoev
- (Italy) 2009–2010 – Silvano Prandi
- (Bulgaria) 2010–2012 – Radostin Stoychev
- (Bulgaria) 2012–2012 – Nayden Naydenov
- (Italy) 2012–2014 – Camillo Placì
- (Bulgaria) 2014–2019 – Plamen Konstantinov
- (Italy) 2019–2022 – Silvano Prandi
- (Bulgaria) 2022–2023 – Nikolay Jeliazkov
- (Bulgaria) 2023 - Plamen Konstantinov
- (Italy) 2024–present – Gianlorenzo Blengini

== Kit providers ==
The table below shows the history of kit providers for the Bulgaria national volleyball team.

Period	Kit provider
2002–2019	Asics
2019–2025	Erreà
2025–	Zeus

=== Sponsorship ===
The main sponsor of the national team is the Bulgarian betting company efbet, while Mikasa and Lidl are secondary sponsors.

== See also ==
- Bulgaria men's U19 team
- Bulgaria men's U21 team
- Bulgaria men's U23 team
- Bulgaria women's team
