= International Volleyball Hall of Fame =

Coordinates: 42°12′20.6″N 72°36′21.5″W

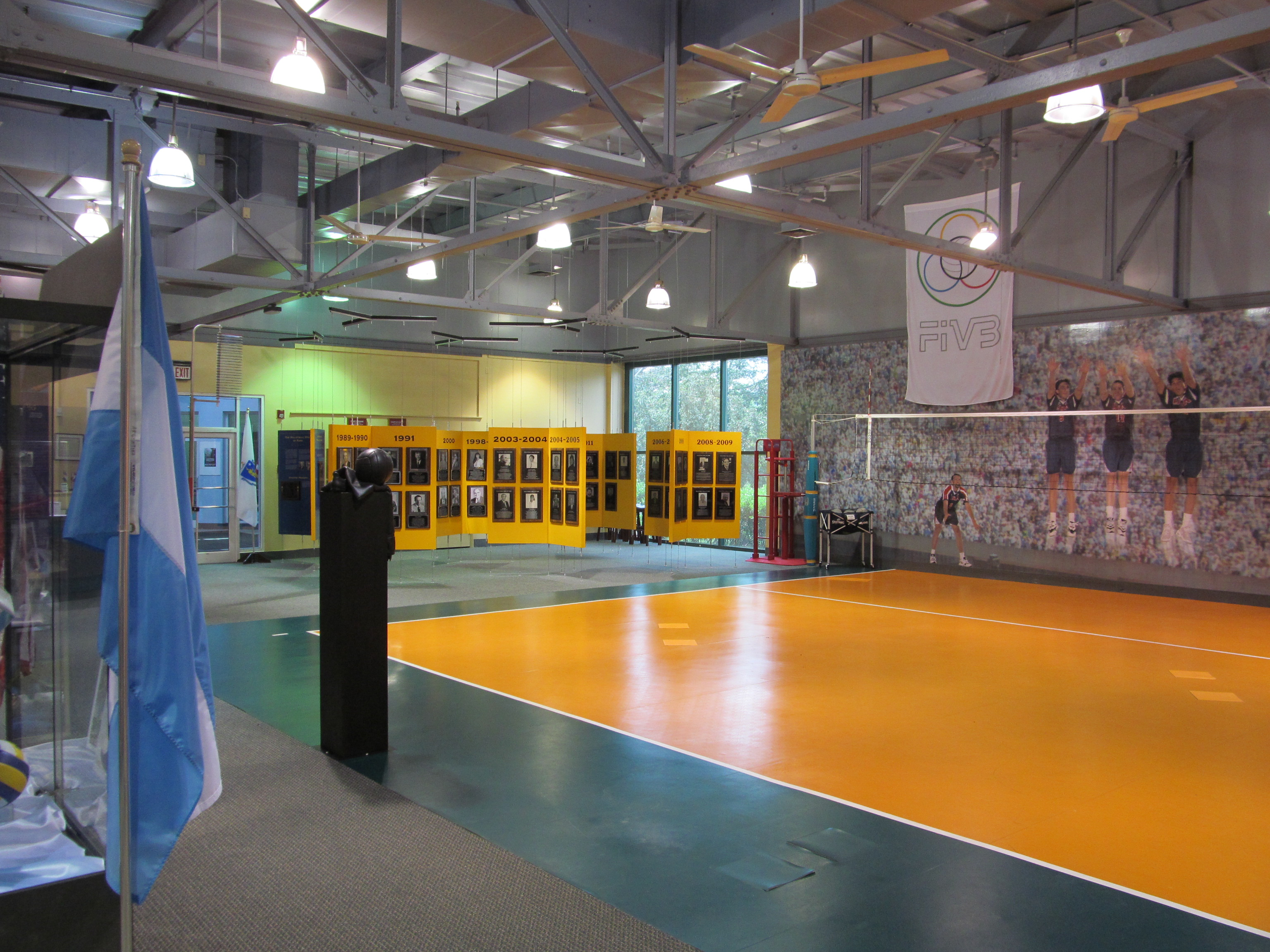
- An exhibit on various inductees at the Hall of Fame, 2012
- Established: 1978
- Location: Holyoke, Massachusetts
- Type: Professional sports hall of fame
- Director: George Mulry (2011– )
- Website: Official website

The International Volleyball Hall of Fame (IVHF) was founded to honor extraordinary players, coaches, officials, and leaders who have made significant contributions to the game of volleyball. The Hall of Fame is located in Holyoke, Massachusetts, where volleyball was invented in 1895 by William G. Morgan at the local YMCA.

== History ==
In 1971, the Greater Holyoke Chamber of Commerce established a committee to campaign for the founding of the Volleyball Hall of Fame in Holyoke, Massachusetts.

By 1977, the city of Holyoke installed signs declaring the location as the "Home of the Volleyball Hall of Fame". However, the advertised attraction was merely a small display case of memorabilia that alternated between being hosted by the Chamber of Commerce and Wistariahurst Museum. In 1978, the committee incorporated as Holyoke Volleyball Hall of Fame, Inc., a nonprofit corporation established for the purpose of planning, promoting, establishing and maintaining a living memorial to the sport of volleyball. The name of the corporation was changed to the International Volleyball Hall of Fame by resolution of the Board of Directors on July 17, 2014.

A small exhibit dedicated to the history of volleyball and the hall of fame's inductees opened in a 1,600 square feet (150 m^{2}) section of the renovated Skinner Mill Warehouse on June 6, 1987 - a building built in 1949 to store silk fabric produced by the famous Skinner Mill in Holyoke. The mill itself was destroyed by fire in 1980.

In 1998, the exhibit was expanded and moved to a permanent 5,000 square feet (460 m^{2}) location in the Skinner Mill Warehouse in downtown Holyoke's Heritage State Park sharing the building with the Holyoke Children's Museum.

The IVHF museum now features exhibits honoring each year's inductees, a replica of a full-size volleyball court, sport timelines, photos, and unique and meaningful memorabilia of the sport along with an interactive video kiosk, a special inductee display area, and a gift shop.

In 1985, William G. Morgan (inventor of volleyball) was posthumously inducted into the hall as its first member. As of 2026, a total of 194 men and women from 29 countries around the world have been inducted into the International Volleyball Hall of Fame.

== Inductees by category ==
The following tables, pre-sorted chronologically, enumerate all of the inductees to the Volleyball Hall of Fame through 2026.

=== Male volleyball players (73 people) ===
==== 1988–1999 (13 people) ====
Year	Name	Born	Nationality	Category (position)	Major achievements	ref.
1988	Eugene Selznick	March 19, 1930	United States	Indoor / Beach	Indoor player: FIVB World Championship: 1956 – 6th, 1960 – 7th.	
1989	Michael O'Hara	September 15, 1932	United States	Indoor / Beach	Indoor player: Olympic Games: 1964 – 9th. FIVB World Championship: 1960 – 7th.	
1991	Rolf Engen	August 5, 1929	United States	Indoor	Indoor player: FIVB World Championship: 1956 – 6th.	
1991	Thomas Haine	January 6, 1933	United States	Indoor	Indoor player: Olympic Games: 1968 – 7th (Captain).	
1992	Ron Von Hagen	November 26, 1938	United States	Beach		
1992	Jon Stanley	July 6, 1943	United States	Indoor (outside hitter)	Indoor player: Olympic Games: 1968 – 7th.	
1993	Mike Bright	November 3, 1937	United States	Indoor	Indoor player: Olympic Games: 1964 – 9th, 1968 – 7th. FIVB World Championship: 1960 – 7th.	
1994	Larry Rundle	November 18, 1944	United States	Indoor / Beach	Indoor player: Olympic Games: 1968 – 7th.	
1997	Pedro Velasco	April 6, 1937	United States	Indoor	Indoor player: Olympic Games: 1964 – 9th (Captain), 1968 – 7th.	
1998	Craig Buck	August 24, 1958	United States	Indoor (middle blocker)	Indoor player: Olympic Games: 1984 – (gold) st, 1988 – (gold) st. FIVB World Championship: 1986 – (gold) st. FIVB World Cup: 1985 – (gold) st.	
1998	Dusty Dvorak	July 29, 1958	United States	Indoor (setter)	Indoor player: Olympic Games: 1984 – (gold) st. FIVB World Championship: 1986 – (gold) st. FIVB World Cup: 1985 – (gold) st.	
1998	Steve Timmons	November 29, 1958	United States	Indoor	Indoor player: Olympic Games: 1984 – (gold) st, 1988 – (gold) st, 1992 – (bronze) rd. FIVB World Championship: 1986 – (gold) st. FIVB World Cup: 1985 – (gold) st. Most Valuable Player of the 1984 Olympic tournament.	
1999	James G. Wortham	January 5, 1910	United States	Indoor		

==== 2000–2009 (22 people) ====
Year	Name	Born	Nationality	Category (position)	Major achievements	ref.
2000	Yuri Chesnokov	January 22, 1933	Soviet Union; Russia	Indoor	Indoor player: Olympic Games: 1964 – (gold) st. FIVB World Championship: 1960 – (gold) st, 1962 – (gold) st. Head coach of the Soviet Union men's national team (1971–1976): Olympic Games: 1972 – (bronze) rd, 1976 – (silver) nd. FIVB World Championship: 1974 – (silver) nd. He was a former FIVB Vice President (1976–1978, 1980–1992, 1996–1998).	
2000	Harold Wendt	May 4, 1915	United States	Indoor		
2001	Karch Kiraly	November 3, 1960	United States	Indoor (outside hitter) / Beach	Indoor player: Olympic Games: 1984 – (gold) st, 1988 – (gold) st (Captain). FIVB World Championship: 1986 – (gold) st. FIVB World Cup: 1985 – (gold) st. Beach player: Olympic Games: 1996 – (gold) st. Most Valuable Player of the 1988 Olympic tournament. Head coach of the United States women's national team (2012–present): Olympic Games: 2016 – (bronze) rd. FIVB World Championship: 2014 – (gold) st. FIVB World Cup: 2015 – (bronze) rd. He is the first and only player (man or woman) to have won Olympic gold medals in both the indoor and beach volleyball categories. He is the first and only male (indoor or beach) volleyball player to have won three Olympic gold medals. He is one of the few persons to have won FIVB World Championship gold medals as a player and as a head coach.	
2002	Tomasz Wójtowicz	September 22, 1953	Poland	Indoor (middle blocker)	Indoor player: Olympic Games: 1976 – (gold) st, 1980 – 4th. FIVB World Championship: 1974 – (gold) st, 1982 – 6th.	
2003	Jungo Morita	August 9, 1947	Japan	Indoor (middle blocker)	Indoor player: Olympic Games: 1968 – (silver) nd, 1972 – (gold) st. FIVB World Championship: 1966 – 5th, 1970 – (bronze) rd. FIVB World Cup: 1969 – (silver) nd, 1977 – (silver) nd.	
2003	Sinjin Smith	May 7, 1957	United States	Beach	Beach player: Olympic Games: 1996 – 5th.	
2004	Josef Musil	July 3, 1932	Czechoslovakia; Czech Republic	Indoor (setter)	Indoor player: Olympic Games: 1964 – (silver) nd, 1968 – (bronze) rd. FIVB World Championship: 1952 – (silver) nd, 1956 – (gold) st, 1960 – (silver) nd, 1962 – (silver) nd, 1966 – (gold) st.	
2004	Seiji Oko	February 15, 1948	Japan	Indoor	Indoor player: Olympic Games: 1968 – (silver) nd, 1972 – (gold) st, 1976 – 4th. FIVB World Championship: 1970 – (bronze) rd. FIVB World Cup: 1969 – (silver) nd. Head coach of the Japan men's national team (1984, 1992): Olympic Games: 1984 – 7th, 1992 – 6th.	
2005	Stanisław Gościniak	February 18, 1944	Poland	Indoor (setter)	Indoor player: Olympic Games: 1968 – 5th, 1972 – 9th. FIVB World Championship: 1970 – 5th, 1974 – (gold) st. Head coach of the Poland men's national team (1986–1987, 2003–2004): Olympic Games: 2004 – 5th. FIVB World Championship: 1986 – 9th.	
2005	Ron Lang	February 5, 1937	United States	Indoor / Beach	Indoor player: Olympic Games: 1964 – 9th.	
2005	Bernard Rajzman	April 25, 1957	Brazil	Indoor	Indoor player: Olympic Games: 1984 – (silver) nd. FIVB World Championship: 1982 – (silver) nd. FIVB World Cup: 1981 – (bronze) rd.	
2005	Konstantin Reva	April 10, 1921	Soviet Union; Russia	Indoor	Indoor player: FIVB World Championship: 1949 – (gold) st, 1952 – (gold) st, 1956 – (bronze) rd.	
2006	Bernie Holtzman	N/A	United States	Beach		
2006	Edward Skorek	June 13, 1943	Poland	Indoor	Indoor player: Olympic Games: 1968 – 5th, 1972 – 9th, 1976 – (gold) st (Captain). FIVB World Championship: 1966 – 6th, 1970 – 5th, 1974 – (gold) st (Captain). FIVB World Cup: 1965 – (silver) nd.	
2007	Bob Ctvrtlik	July 8, 1963	United States	Indoor (outside hitter)	Indoor player: Olympic Games: 1988 – (gold) st, 1992 – (bronze) rd (Captain), 1996 – 9th. FIVB World Championship: 1986 – (gold) st.	
2007	Andrea Gardini	October 1, 1965	Italy	Indoor (middle blocker)	Indoor player: Olympic Games: 1996 – (silver) nd, 2000 – (bronze) rd. FIVB World Championship: 1990 – (gold) st, 1994 – (gold) st, 1998 – (gold) st. FIVB World Cup: 1989 – (silver) nd, 1995 – (gold) st.	
2007	Dimitar Zlatanov	November 9, 1948	Bulgaria	Indoor	Indoor player: Olympic Games: 1972 – 4th, 1980 – (silver) nd. FIVB World Championship: 1970 – (silver) nd.	
2008	Andrea Giani	April 22, 1970	Italy	Indoor (middle blocker)	Indoor player: Olympic Games: 1988 – 9th, 1992 – 5th, 1996 – (silver) nd, 2000 – (bronze) rd, 2004 – (silver) nd. FIVB World Championship: 1990 – (gold) st, 1994 – (gold) st, 1998 – (gold) st. FIVB World Cup: 1995 – (gold) st, 1999 – (bronze) rd, 2003 – (silver) nd. Most Valuable Player of the 1995 FIVB World Cup. Head coach of the Slovenia men's national team (2015–2017). Head coach of the Germany men's national team (2017–present). He is a rare five-time Olympian as a player.	
2008	Yuri Poyarkov	February 10, 1937	Soviet Union; Ukraine	Indoor	Indoor player (representing Soviet Union): Olympic Games: 1964 – (gold) st, 1968 – (gold) st, 1972 – (bronze) rd. FIVB World Championship: 1960 – (gold) st, 1962 – (gold) st. FIVB World Cup: 1965 – (gold) st.	
2008	Randy Stoklos	December 13, 1960	United States	Beach		
2009	Ivan Bugajenkov	February 18, 1938	Soviet Union; Latvia	Indoor	Indoor player (representing Soviet Union): Olympic Games: 1964 – (gold) st, 1968 – (gold) st. FIVB World Championship: 1960 – (gold) st, 1962 – (gold) st. FIVB World Cup: 1965 – (gold) st. Head coach of the Iran men's national team (1993).	
2009	Siegfried Schneider	November 12, 1939	East Germany; Germany	Indoor	Indoor player: Olympic Games: 1968 – 4th, 1972 – (silver) nd. FIVB World Championship: 1970 – (gold) st. FIVB World Cup: 1969 – (gold) st.	

==== 2010–2019 (22 persons) ====
Year	Name	Born	Nationality	Category (position)	Major achievements	ref.
2010	Aleksandr Savin	July 1, 1957	Soviet Union; Russia	Indoor	Indoor player: Olympic Games: 1976 – (silver) nd, 1980 – (gold) st. FIVB World Championship: 1974 – (silver) nd, 1978 – (gold) st. FIVB World Cup: 1977 – (gold) st.	
2011	Lorenzo Bernardi	August 11, 1968	Italy	Indoor (outside hitter)	Indoor player: Olympic Games: 1988 – 9th, 1992 – 5th, 1996 – (silver) nd. FIVB World Championship: 1990 – (gold) st, 1994 – (gold) st. FIVB World Cup: 1989 – (silver) nd, 1995 – (gold) st. Most Valuable Player of the 1994 FIVB World Championship.	
2011	Hugo Conte	April 14, 1963	Argentina	Indoor	Indoor player: Olympic Games: 1984 – 6th, 1988 – (bronze) rd, 2000 – 4th. FIVB World Championship: 1982 – (bronze) rd, 1986 – 7th. FIVB World Cup: 1985 – 5th.	
2011	Vladimir Grbić	December 14, 1970	Yugoslavia; Serbia and Montenegro; Serbia	Indoor (outside hitter)	Indoor player: Olympic Games: 1996 – (bronze) rd, 2000 – (gold) st, 2004 – 5th. FIVB World Championship: 1998 – (silver) nd. FIVB World Cup: 2003 – (bronze) rd. He and his younger brother Nikola Grbić are the first brothers to both be inducted into the International Volleyball Hall of Fame.	
2012	Peter Blangé	December 9, 1964	Netherlands	Indoor (setter)	Indoor player: Olympic Games: 1988 – 5th, 1992 – (silver) nd, 1996 – (gold) st (Captain), 2000 – 5th. FIVB World Championship: 1994 – (silver) nd. FIVB World Cup: 1995 – (silver) nd. Head coach of the Netherlands men's national team (2006–2011).	
2012	Mike Dodd	August 20, 1957	United States	Beach	Beach player: Olympic Games: 1996 – (silver) nd.	
2012	Maurício Lima	November 27, 1968	Brazil	Indoor (setter)	Indoor player: Olympic Games: 1988 – 4th, 1992 – (gold) st, 1996 – 5th, 2000 – 6th, 2004 – (gold) st. FIVB World Championship: 1990 – 4th, 1994 – 5th, 1998 – 4th, 2002 – (gold) st. FIVB World Cup: 2003 – (gold) st. He is a rare five-time Olympian as a player.	
2012	Georgy Mondzolevski	January 26, 1934	Soviet Union; Russia	Indoor (setter)	Indoor player: Olympic Games: 1964 – (gold) st, 1968 – (gold) st. FIVB World Championship: 1956 – (bronze) rd, 1960 – (gold) st, 1962 – (gold) st.	
2012	Jeff Stork	July 8, 1960	United States	Indoor (setter)	Indoor player: Olympic Games: 1988 – (gold) st, 1992 – (bronze) rd, 1996 – 9th. FIVB World Championship: 1986 – (gold) st. FIVB World Cup: 1985 – (gold) st.	
2013	Vyacheslav Zaytsev	November 12, 1952	Soviet Union; Russia	Indoor (setter)	Indoor player: Olympic Games: 1976 – (silver) nd, 1980 – (gold) st, 1988 – (silver) nd. FIVB World Championship: 1974 – (silver) nd, 1978 – (gold) st, 1982 – (gold) st, 1986 – (silver) nd. FIVB World Cup: 1977 – (gold) st (Captain), 1981 – (gold) st, 1985 – (silver) nd. Head coach of the Russia men's national team (1996–1997).	
2014	Nalbert Bitencourt	March 9, 1974	Brazil	Indoor (outside hitter)	Indoor player: Olympic Games: 2004 – (gold) st (Captain). FIVB World Championship: 1998 – 4th (Captain), 2002 – (gold) st. FIVB World Cup: 2003 – (gold) st (Captain). He is the first indoor volleyball player in the world to be a youth, junior and senior world champion.	
2015	Lloy Ball	February 17, 1972	United States	Indoor (setter)	Indoor player: Olympic Games: 1996 – 9th, 2000 – 11th (Captain), 2004 – 4th (Captain), 2008 – (gold) st. FIVB World Championship: 1994 – (bronze) rd, 1998 – 9th, 2002 – 9th. FIVB World Cup: 1999 – 4th, 2003 – 4th (Captain), 2007 – 4th.	
2015	Renan Dal Zotto	July 19, 1960	Brazil	Indoor (outside hitter)	Indoor player: Olympic Games: 1980 – 5th, 1984 – (silver) nd, 1988 – 4th. FIVB World Championship: 1982 – (silver) nd, 1986 – 4th. FIVB World Cup: 1977 – 8th, 1981 – (bronze) rd, 1985 – 4th. Head coach of the Brazil men's national team (2017–present): FIVB World Championship: 2018 – (silver) nd.	
2016	Nikola Grbić	September 6, 1973	Yugoslavia; Serbia and Montenegro; Serbia	Indoor (setter)	Indoor player: Olympic Games: 1996 – (bronze) rd, 2000 – (gold) st (Captain), 2004 – 5th (Captain), 2008 – 5th (Captain). FIVB World Championship: 1998 – (silver) nd, 2002 – 4th (Captain), 2006 – 4th (Captain), 2010 – (bronze) rd (Captain). FIVB World Cup: 2003 – (bronze) rd (Captain). Head coach of the Serbia men's national team (2015–present): FIVB World Championship: 2018 – 4th. He and his elder brother Vladimir Grbić are the first brothers to both be inducted into the International Volleyball Hall of Fame.	
2016	Emanuel Rego	April 15, 1973	Brazil	Beach	Beach player: Olympic Games: 1996 – 9th, 2000 – 9th, 2004 – (gold) st, 2008 – (bronze) rd, 2012 – (silver) nd. FIVB World Championships: 1997 – 5th, 1999 – (gold) st, 2001 – 5th, 2003 – (gold) st, 2005 – 17th, 2007 – 4th, 2009 – 5th, 2011 – (gold) st. He is the first male beach volleyball player to have competed consecutively in five Olympic Games.	
2017	José Loiola	March 28, 1970	Brazil	Beach	Beach player: Olympic Games: 1996 – 9th, 2000 – 9th. FIVB World Championships: 1997 – 5th, 1999 – (gold) st, 2001 – (silver) nd.	
2017	Ronald Zwerver	June 6, 1967	Netherlands	Indoor	Indoor player: Olympic Games: 1988 – 5th, 1992 – (silver) nd, 1996 – (gold) st. FIVB World Championship: 1990 – 7th, 1994 – (silver) nd. FIVB World Cup: 1995 – (silver) nd.	
2018	Gilberto (Giba) Godoy Filho	December 23, 1976	Brazil	Indoor (outside hitter)	Indoor player: Olympic Games: 2000 – 6th, 2004 – (gold) st, 2008 – (silver) nd, 2012 – (silver) nd (Captain). FIVB World Championship: 1998 – 4th, 2002 – (gold) st, 2006 – (gold) st, 2010 – (gold) st (Captain). FIVB World Cup: 1995 – (bronze) rd, 1999 – 5th, 2003 – (gold) st, 2007 – (gold) st (Captain), 2011 – (bronze) rd. Most Valuable Player of the 2004 Olympic tournament, the 2006 FIVB World Championship, and the 2007 FIVB World Cup. He is the first and only male indoor volleyball player to have been named Most Valuable Player of the Olympic tournament, the FIVB World Championship and the FIVB World Cup.	
2018	Bas van de Goor	September 4, 1971	Netherlands	Indoor (middle blocker)	Indoor player: Olympic Games: 1996 – (gold) st, 2000 – 5th. FIVB World Championship: 1994 – (silver) nd, 1998 – 6th. FIVB World Cup: 1995 – (silver) nd. Most Valuable Player of the 1996 Olympic tournament and the 2000 Olympic tournament.	
2019	Boris Gyuderov	February 12, 1927	Bulgaria	Indoor	Indoor player: FIVB World Championship: 1949 – (bronze) rd, 1952 – (bronze) rd.	
2019	Zé Marco de Melo	March 19, 1971	Brazil	Beach	Beach Player: Olympic Games: 2000 – (silver) nd.	
2019	Josef Tesař	March 11, 1927	Czechoslovakia; Czech Republic	Indoor	Indoor player: FIVB World Championship: 1956 – (gold) st, 1949 – (silver) nd, 1952 – (silver) nd.	

==== 2020–2029 (16 persons) ====
Year	Name	Born	Nationality	Category (position)	Major achievements	ref.
2021	Giovane Gávio	September 7, 1970	Brazil	Indoor	Indoor player: Olympic Games: 1992 – (gold) st, 2004 – (gold) st. FIVB World Championship: 2002 – (gold) st.	
2021	Todd Rogers	September 30, 1973	United States	Beach	Beach Player: Olympic Games: 2008 – (gold) st. FIVB World Championship: 2007 – (gold) st.	
2021	Ricardo Santos	January 6, 1975	Brazil	Beach	Beach Player: Olympic Games: 2000 – (silver) nd, 2004 – (gold) st, 2008 – (bronze) rd.	
2021	Sérgio Santos	October 15, 1975	Brazil	Indoor	Indoor player: Olympic Games: 2004 – (gold) st, 2008 – (silver) nd, 2012 – (silver) nd, 2016 – (gold) st. FIVB World Championship: 2002 – (gold) st, 2006 – (gold) st. First libero to be named Most Valuable Player in the history of the FIVB World League.	
2021	Clay Stanley	January 20, 1978	United States	Indoor	Indoor player: Olympic Games: 2008 – (gold) st.	
2021	Sergey Tetyukhin	September 23, 1975	Soviet Union; Russia	Indoor	Indoor player: Olympic Games: 2000 – (silver) nd, 2004 – (bronze) rd, 2008 – (bronze) rd, 2012 – (gold) st. FIVB World Championship: 2002 – (silver) nd. FIVB World Cup: 1999 – (gold) st, 2007 – (silver) nd, 2011 – (gold) st.	
2022	Samuele Papi	May 20, 1973	Italy	Indoor	Indoor player: Olympic Games: 1996 – (silver) nd, 2000 – (bronze) rd, 2004 – (silver) nd, 2012 – (bronze) rd. FIVB World Championship: 1994 – (gold) st, 1998 – (gold) st.	
2023	Phil Dalhausser	January 26, 1980	United States	Beach	Beach Player: Olympic Games: 2008 – (gold) st.	
2023	Katsutoshi Nekoda	February 1, 1944	Japan	Indoor	Indoor player: Olympic Games: 1964 – (bronze) rd, 1968 – (silver) nd, 1972 – (gold) st.	
2024	Tim Hovland	February 23, 1959	United States	Beach		
2024	Andrea Zorzi	July 29, 1965	Italy	Indoor	Indoor player: Olympic Games: 1996 – (silver) nd. FIVB World Championship: 1990 – (gold) st, 1994 – (gold) st.	
2025	Kent Steffes	June 23, 1968	United States	Beach	Beach Player: Olympic Games: 1996 – (gold) st. FIVB World Championship: 1997 – (bronze) rd.	
2025	Dimitar Karov	November 27, 1943	Bulgaria	Indoor	Indoor player: FIVB World Championship: 1970 – (silver) nd.	
2025	Ivan Miljković	September 13, 1979	Serbia	Indoor	Indoor player: Olympic Games: 2000 – (gold) st. FIVB World Championship: 1998 – (silver) nd.	
2026	Alison Cerutti	December 7, 1985	Brazil	Beach	Beach Player: Olympic Games: 2016 – (gold) st, 2012 – (silver) nd. FIVB World Championship: 2011 – (gold) st, 2015 – (gold) st, 2009 – (silver) nd.	
2026	Joël Despaigne	July 2, 1966	Cuba	Indoor	Indoor player: FIVB World Championship: 1990 – (silver) nd. FIVB World Cup: 1989 – (gold) st, 1991 – (silver) nd	

=== Female volleyball players (54 persons) ===
==== 1988–1999 (8 persons) ====
Year	Name	Born	Nationality	Category (position)	Major achievements	ref.
1988	Flo Hyman	July 31, 1954	United States	Indoor	Indoor player: Olympic Games: 1984 – (silver) nd. FIVB World Championship: 1978 – 5th, 1982 – (bronze) rd. FIVB World Cup: 1977 – 7th, 1981 – 4th.	
1988	Jane Ward	April 30, 1932	United States	Indoor (outside hitter)	Indoor player: Olympic Games: 1964 – 5th, 1968 – 8th. FIVB World Championship: 1956 – 9th, 1960 – 6th.	
1989	Kathy Gregory	1945	United States	Indoor / Beach		
1990	Mary Jo Peppler	October 17, 1944	United States	Indoor	Indoor player: Olympic Games: 1964 – 5th. FIVB World Championship: 1970 – 11th.	
1994	Patty Dowdell	1955	United States	Indoor		
1995	Debbie Green	June 25, 1958	United States	Indoor (setter)	Indoor player: Olympic Games: 1984 – (silver) nd. FIVB World Championship: 1982 – (bronze) rd.	
1996	Patricia Bright	December 27, 1940	United States	Indoor (setter)	Indoor player: Olympic Games: 1964 – 5th, 1968 – 8th.	
1998	Paula Weishoff	May 1, 1962	United States	Indoor	Indoor player: Olympic Games: 1984 – (silver) nd, 1992 – (bronze) rd, 1996 – 7th. FIVB World Championship: 1982 – (bronze) rd, 1986 – 10th. FIVB World Cup: 1991 – 4th. Most Valuable Player of the 1992 Olympic tournament.	

==== 2000–2009 (14 persons) ====
Year	Name	Born	Nationality	Category (position)	Major achievements	ref.
2000	Inna Ryskal	June 15, 1944	Soviet Union; Azerbaijan	Indoor	Indoor player: Olympic Games: 1964 – (silver) nd, 1968 – (gold) st, 1972 – (gold) st, 1976 – (silver) nd. FIVB World Championship: 1962 – (silver) nd, 1970 – (gold) st, 1974 – (silver) nd. FIVB World Cup: 1973 – (gold) st.	
2000	Takako Shirai	July 18, 1952	Japan	Indoor	Indoor player: Olympic Games: 1972 – (silver) nd, 1976 – (gold) st. FIVB World Championship: 1974 – (gold) st. FIVB World Cup: 1977 – (gold) st.	
2001	Jean Gaertner	November 1, 1938	United States	Indoor	Indoor player: Olympic Games: 1964 – 5th. FIVB World Championship: 1960 – 6th. She is the first female athlete to compete in two Olympiads in two non-related sports: high jump (1960) and volleyball (1964).	
2001	Regla Torres	February 12, 1975	Cuba	Indoor (middle blocker)	Indoor player: Olympic Games: 1992 – (gold) st, 1996 – (gold) st, 2000 – (gold) st. FIVB World Championship: 1994 – (gold) st, 1998 – (gold) st. FIVB World Cup: 1991 – (gold) st, 1995 – (gold) st. Most Valuable Player of the 1994 FIVB World Championship and the 1998 FIVB World Championship.	
2002	"Jenny" Lang Ping	December 10, 1960	China	Indoor (outside hitter)	Indoor player: Olympic Games: 1984 – (gold) st. FIVB World Championship: 1982 – (gold) st, 1990 – (silver) nd. FIVB World Cup: 1981 – (gold) st, 1985 – (gold) st. Most Valuable Player of the 1984 Olympic tournament, the 1982 FIVB World Championship, and the 1985 FIVB World Cup. Head coach of the China women's national team (1995–1998, 2013–present): Olympic Games: 1996 – (silver) nd, 2016 – (gold) st. FIVB World Championship: 1998 – (silver) nd, 2014 – (silver) nd, 2018 – (bronze) rd. FIVB World Cup: 1995 – (bronze) rd, 2015 – (gold) st. Head coach of the United States women's national team (2005–2008): Olympic Games: 2008 – (silver) nd. FIVB World Championship: 2006 – 9th. FIVB World Cup: 2007 – (bronze) rd. She is the first and only female indoor volleyball player to have been named Most Valuable Player of the Olympic tournament, the FIVB World Championship and the FIVB World Cup. She is the first and only person (man or woman) to have won gold at the Olympics (and FIVB World Cup) both as a player and as a head coach.	
2004	Karolyn Kirby	June 30, 1961	United States	Beach	Beach player: FIVB World Championships: 1997 – (bronze) rd.	
2004	Mireya Luis	February 25, 1967	Cuba	Indoor (outside hitter)	Indoor player: Olympic Games: 1992 – (gold) st, 1996 – (gold) st, 2000 – (gold) st. FIVB World Championship: 1986 – (silver) nd, 1990 – 4th, 1994 – (gold) st, 1998 – (gold) st. FIVB World Cup: 1989 – (gold) st, 1991 – (gold) st, 1995 – (gold) st. Most Valuable Player of the 1989 FIVB World Cup and the 1995 FIVB World Cup.	
2005	Cecilia Tait	May 2, 1962	Peru	Indoor	Indoor player: Olympic Games: 1980 – 6th, 1984 – 4th, 1988 – (silver) nd. FIVB World Championship: 1982 – (silver) nd, 1986 – (bronze) rd. Most Valuable Player of the 1988 Olympic tournament.	
2006	Jacqueline "Jackie" Silva	February 13, 1962	Brazil	Indoor / Beach	Indoor player: Olympic Games: 1980 – 7th, 1984 – 7th. Beach player: Olympic Games: 1996 – (gold) st. FIVB World Championships: 1997 – (gold) st.	
2006	Nina Smoleeva	March 28, 1948	Soviet Union; Russia	Indoor	Indoor player: Olympic Games: 1968 – (gold) st, 1972 – (gold) st, 1976 – (silver) nd. FIVB World Championship: 1970 – (gold) st, 1978 – (bronze) rd. FIVB World Cup: 1973 – (gold) st.	
2007	Kerri Pottharst	June 25, 1965	Australia	Beach	Beach player: Olympic Games: 1996 – (bronze) rd, 2000 – (gold) st, 2004 – 9th. FIVB World Championships: 1997 – 9th, 1999 – 7th, 2001 – 9th.	
2008	Masae Kasai	July 14, 1933	Japan	Indoor	Indoor player: Olympic Games: 1964 – (gold) st. FIVB World Championship: 1960 – (silver) nd, 1962 – (gold) st.	
2009	Holly McPeak	May 15, 1969	United States	Beach	Beach player: Olympic Games: 1996 – 5th, 2000 – 5th, 2004 – (bronze) rd. FIVB World Championships: 1997 – (silver) nd, 2003 – 5th, 2005 – 33rd.	
2009	Ana Moser	August 14, 1968	Brazil	Indoor (outside hitter)	Indoor player: Olympic Games: 1988 – 6th, 1992 – 4th, 1996 – (bronze) rd. FIVB World Championship: 1990 – 7th, 1994 – (silver) nd, 1998 – 4th. FIVB World Cup: 1995 – (silver) nd, 1999 – (bronze) rd.	

==== 2010–2019 (18 persons) ====
Year	Name	Born	Nationality	Category (position)	Major achievements	ref.
2010	Shelda Bede	January 1, 1973	Brazil	Beach	Beach player: Olympic Games: 2000 – (silver) nd, 2004 – (silver) nd. FIVB World Championships: 1997 – (bronze) rd, 1999 – (gold) st, 2001 – (gold) st, 2003 – (silver) nd, 2005 – 5th, 2009 – 4th.	
2010	Adriana Behar	February 14, 1969	Brazil	Beach	Beach player: Olympic Games: 2000 – (silver) nd, 2004 – (silver) nd. FIVB World Championships: 1997 – (bronze) rd, 1999 – (gold) st, 2001 – (gold) st, 2003 – (silver) nd, 2005 – 5th.	
2010	Gabriela Pérez del Solar	July 10, 1968	Peru	Indoor (middle blocker)	Indoor player: Olympic Games: 1984 – 4th, 1988 – (silver) nd. FIVB World Championship: 1986 – (bronze) rd, 1990 – 6th. FIVB World Cup: 1985 – 5th, 1989 – 5th, 1991 – 5th.	
2011	Magaly Carvajal	December 18, 1968	Cuba	Indoor (middle blocker)	Indoor player: Olympic Games: 1992 – (gold) st, 1996 – (gold) st. FIVB World Championship: 1990 – 4th, 1994 – (gold) st. FIVB World Cup: 1989 – (gold) st, 1991 – (gold) st, 1995 – (gold) st.	
2011	Rita Crockett	November 6, 1957	United States	Indoor	Indoor player: Olympic Games: 1984 – (silver) nd. FIVB World Championship: 1982 – (bronze) rd. FIVB World Cup: 1981 – 4th.	
2012	Lyudmila Buldakova	May 25, 1938	Soviet Union; Russia	Indoor	Indoor player: Olympic Games: 1964 – (silver) nd, 1968 – (gold) st (Captain), 1972 – (gold) st (Captain). FIVB World Championship: 1956 – (gold) st, 1960 – (gold) st, 1962 – (silver) nd, 1970 – (gold) st.	
2013	Natalie Cook	January 19, 1975	Australia	Beach	Beach player: Olympic Games: 1996 – (bronze) rd, 2000 – (gold) st, 2004 – 4th, 2008 – 5th, 2012 – 19th. FIVB World Championships: 1997 – 9th, 1999 – 9th, 2001 – 9th, 2003 – (bronze) rd, 2005 – 25th, 2007 – 9th, 2011 – 33rd. She is the first female beach volleyball player to have competed consecutively in five Olympic Games.	
2013	Caren Kemner	April 16, 1965	United States	Indoor (outside hitter)	Indoor player: Olympic Games: 1988 – 7th, 1992 – (bronze) rd, 1996 – 7th. FIVB World Championship: 1990 – (bronze) rd. FIVB World Cup: 1991 FIVB World Cup – 4th, 1995 – 7th. Most Valuable Player of the 1991 FIVB World Cup.	
2014	Tara Cross-Battle	September 16, 1968	United States	Indoor (outside hitter)	Indoor player: Olympic Games: 1992 – (bronze) rd, 1996 – 7th, 2000 – 4th, 2004 – 5th. FIVB World Championship: 1990 – (bronze) rd, 1994 – 6th, 2002 – (silver) nd. FIVB World Cup: 1991 – 4th, 1995 – 7th, 2003 – (bronze) rd.	
2014	Sandra Pires	June 16, 1973	Brazil	Beach	Beach player: Olympic Games: 1996 – (gold) st, 2000 – (bronze) rd, 2004 – 5th. FIVB World Championships: 1997 – (gold) st, 1999 – 4th, 2001 – (silver) nd, 2003 – 5th, 2005 – 17th.	
2014	Rosa Salikhova	September 24, 1944	Soviet Union; Russia	Indoor	Indoor player: Olympic Games: 1968 – (gold) st, 1972 – (gold) st. FIVB World Championship: 1970 – (gold) st, 1974 – (silver) nd. FIVB World Cup: 1973 – (gold) st.	
2015	Hélia Souza Pinto (Fofão)	March 10, 1970	Brazil	Indoor (setter)	Indoor player: Olympic Games: 1992 – 4th, 1996 – (bronze) rd, 2000 – (bronze) rd, 2004 – 4th, 2008 – (gold) st. FIVB World Championship: 1994 – (silver) nd, 1998 – 4th, 2006 – (silver) nd. FIVB World Cup: 1995 – (silver) nd, 1999 – (bronze) rd, 2003 – (silver) nd, 2007 – (silver) nd. She is a rare five-time Olympian as a player.	
2016	Misty May-Treanor	July 30, 1977	United States	Beach	Beach player: Olympic Games: 2000 – 5th, 2004 – (gold) st, 2008 – (gold) st, 2012 – (gold) st. FIVB World Championships: 2001 – 9th, 2003 – (gold) st, 2005 – (gold) st, 2007 – (gold) st, 2011 – (silver) nd. She and teammate Kerri Walsh Jennings are the first two beach volleyball players to have consecutively won three Olympic games.	
2016	Danielle Scott-Arruda	October 1, 1972	United States	Indoor (middle blocker)	Indoor player: Olympic Games: 1996 – 7th, 2000 – 4th, 2004 – 5th, 2008 – (silver) nd, 2012 – (silver) nd. FIVB World Championship: 1994 – 6th, 1998 – 13th, 2002 – (silver) nd. FIVB World Cup: 1999 – 9th, 2003 – (bronze) rd, 2007 – (bronze) rd, 2011 – (silver) nd. She is a rare five-time Olympian as a player.	
2017	Irina Kirillova	May 15, 1965	Soviet Union; Croatia	Indoor (setter)	Indoor player (representing Soviet Union): Olympic Games: 1988 – (gold) st. FIVB World Championship: 1990 – (gold) st. Indoor player (representing Croatia): FIVB World Cup: 1995 – 4th. Most Valuable Player of the 1990 FIVB World Championship. Head coach of the Croatia women's national team (2011).	
2018	Evgeniya Artamonova Estes	July 17, 1975	Soviet Union; Russia	Indoor	Indoor player: Olympic Games: 1992 – (silver) nd, 1996 – 4th, 2000 – (silver) nd, 2004 – (silver) nd, 2008 – 5th, 2012 – 5th. FIVB World Championship: 1994 – (bronze) rd, 1998 – (bronze) rd, 2002 – (bronze) rd. FIVB World Cup: 1991 – (bronze) rd, 1999 – (silver) nd. She is the first and only female indoor volleyball player to have competed consecutively in six Olympic Games.	
2019	Mirka Francia	December 18, 1968	Cuba	Indoor (middle blocker)	Indoor player: Olympic Games: 1996 – (gold) st, 2000 – (gold) st. FIVB World Championship: 1994 – (gold) st, 1998 – (gold) st. FIVB World Cup: 1999 – (gold) st.	
2019	Valentina Ogiyenko	May 26, 1965	Soviet Union; Russia	Indoor	Indoor player (representing Soviet Union): Olympic Games: 1988 – (gold) st. FIVB World Championship: 1990 – (gold) st.	

==== 2020–2029 (14 persons) ====
Year	Name	Born	Nationality	Category (position)	Major achievements	ref.
2021	Taismary Agüero	March 5, 1977	Cuba; Italy	Indoor	Indoor player: Olympic Games: 1996 – (gold) st, 2000 – (gold) st. FIVB World Championship: 1998 – (gold) st.	
2021	Logan Tom	May 25, 1981	United States	Indoor	Indoor player: Olympic Games: 2008 – (silver) nd, 2012 – (silver) nd. FIVB World Championship: 2002 – (silver) nd.	
2022	Fernanda Venturini	October 24, 1970	Brazil	Indoor	Indoor player: Olympic Games: 1996 – (bronze) rd. FIVB World Championship: 1994 – (silver) nd.	
2022	Kerri Walsh Jennings	August 16, 1978	United States	Beach	Beach player: Olympic Games: 2004 – (gold) st, 2008 – (gold) st, 2012 – (gold) st, 2016 – (bronze) rd.	
2023	Larissa França	April 14, 1982	Brazil	Beach	Beach player: Olympic Games: 2012 – (bronze) rd. FIVB World Championships: 2011 – (gold) st, 2005 – (silver) nd, 2009 – (silver) nd, 2007 – (bronze) rd, 2017 – (bronze) rd.	
2023	Yumilka Ruiz	May 8, 1978	Cuba	Indoor	Indoor player: Olympic Games: 1996 – (gold) st, 2000 – (gold) st, 2004 – (bronze) rd.	
2024	Regla Bell	July 6, 1970	Cuba	Indoor	Indoor player: Olympic Games: 1992 – (gold) st, 1996 – (gold) st, 2000 – (gold) st. FIVB World Championship: 1994 – (gold) st, 1998 – (gold) st.	
2024	Ana Paula Henkel	February 13, 1972	Brazil	Beach	Indoor player: Olympic Games: 1996 – (bronze) rd. FIVB World Championship: 1994 – (silver) nd.	
2025	Laura Ludwig	January 13, 1986	Germany	Beach	Beach player: Olympic Games: 2016 – (gold) st. FIVB World Championships: 2017 – (gold) st.	
2025	Francesca Piccinini	January 10, 1979	Italy	Indoor	Indoor player: FIVB World Championship: 2002 – (gold) st.	
2025	Rosa García Rivas	May 21, 1964	Peru	Indoor	Indoor player: Olympic Games: 1988 – (silver) nd. FIVB World Championship: 1982 – (silver) nd, 1986 – (bronze) rd.	
2026	April Ross	June 20, 1982	United States	Beach	Beach player: Olympic Games: 2020 – (gold) st, 2012 – (silver) nd, 2016 – (bronze) rd. FIVB World Championships: 2009 – (gold) st, 2017 – (silver) nd, 2019 – (silver) nd.	
2026	Fabiana Alvim	March 7, 1980	Brazil	Indoor	Indoor player: Olympic Games: 2008 – (gold) st, 2012 – (gold) st. FIVB World Championship: 2006 – (silver) nd, 2010 – (silver) nd.	
2026	Yekaterina Gamova	October 17, 1980	Russia	Indoor	Indoor player: Olympic Games: 2000 – (silver) nd, 2004 – (silver) nd. FIVB World Championship: 2006 – (gold) st, 2010 – (gold) st, 2002 – (bronze) rd.	

=== Paravolley (4 persons) ===
==== 2020–2029 (4 persons) ====
Year	Name	Born	Nationality	Major achievements	Ref.
2022	Pieter Joon	February 4, 1942	Netherlands	Father of Sitting Volleyball.	
2024	Hadi Rezaei	December 10, 1960	Iran	Sitting volleyball player: Paralympics: 1988 – (gold) st, 1992 – (gold) st, 1996 – (gold) st. Head coach of the Iran men's national sitting volleyball team: Paralympics: 2000 – (gold) st, 2004 – (silver) nd, 2008 – (gold) st, 2012 – (silver) nd, 2016 – (gold) st, 2020 – (gold) st, 2024 – (gold) st.	
2025	Barry Couzner	June 9, 1947	Australia	President of World ParaVolley 2014–2023.	
2026	Denis Le Breuilly	September 15, 1946	Jersey	Sport director of World ParaVolley 2010–2018.	

=== Volleyball coaches (31 persons) ===
==== 1988–1999 (10 persons) ====
Year	Name	Born	Nationality	Major achievements	Ref.
1988	Harry Wilson	October 28, 1908	United States	Head coach of the United States men's national team: Olympic Games: 1964 – 9th. FIVB World Championship: 1956 – 6th.	
1989	Douglas Beal	March 4, 1947	United States	Head coach of the United States men's national team (1977–1984, 1997–2005): Olympic Games: 1984 – (gold) st, 2000 – 11th, 2004 – 4th. FIVB World Championship: 1978 – 19th, 1982 – 13th, 1998 – 9th, 2002 – 9th. FIVB World Cup: 1999 – 4th, 2003 – 4th.	
1990	Col. Edward DeGroot	December 17, 1906	United States		
1992	Dr. James Coleman	October 22, 1931	United States	Head coach of the United States men's national team (1965–1970, 1979–1980, 1990): Olympic Games: 1968 – 7th. FIVB World Championship: 1966 – 11th, 1970 – 18th, 1990 – 13th.	
1993	Al Scates	June 9, 1939	United States		
1994	Marv Dunphy	1948	United States	Head coach of the United States men's national team (1985–1988): Olympic Games: 1988 – (gold) st. FIVB World Championship: 1986 – (gold) st. FIVB World Cup: 1985 – (gold) st.	
1995	Arie Selinger	April 5, 1937	Israel; United States	Indoor player (representing Israel): FIVB World Championship: 1956 – 16th. Head coach of the Israel women's national team (1967). Head coach of the United States women's national team (1975–1984): Olympic Games: 1984 – (silver) nd. FIVB World Championship: 1978 – 5th, 1982 – (bronze) rd. FIVB World Cup: 1977 – 7th, 1981 – 4th. Head coach of the Netherlands men's national team: Olympic Games: 1992 – (silver) nd. He is one of few head coaches to lead national teams to win Olympic medals with both genders.	
1996	Donald Shondell	January 1, 1929	United States		
1997	Andy Banachowski	August 1945	United States		
1998	Yasutaka Matsudaira	January 22, 1930	Japan	Head coach of the Japan men's national team: Olympic Games: 1964 – (bronze) rd, 1968 – (silver) nd, 1972 – (gold) st. He was a former FIVB Vice President (1994–1996).	

==== 2000–2009 (8 persons) ====
Year	Name	Born	Nationality	Major achievements	Ref.
2000	Hirofumi Daimatsu	December 2, 1921	Japan	Head coach of the Japan women's national team: Olympic Games: 1964 – (gold) st. FIVB World Championship: 1960 – (silver) nd, 1962 – (gold) st.	
2002	Viacheslav Platonov	February 21, 1939	Soviet Union; Russia	Head coach of the Soviet Union men's national team (1977–1985, 1990–1992, 1995–1997): Olympic Games: 1980 – (gold) st. FIVB World Championship: 1978 – (gold) st, 1982 – (gold) st, 1990 – (bronze) rd. FIVB World Cup: 1977 – (gold) st, 1981 – (gold) st, 1985 – (silver) nd, 1991 – (gold) st. Head coach of the Finland men's national team (1992–1994). Head coach of the Russia men's national team (1995–1997): Olympic Games: 1996 – 4th.	
2003	Givi Akhvlediani	July 17, 1918	Soviet Union; Russia	Indoor player: FIVB World Championship: 1952 – (gold) st. Head coach of the Soviet Union men's national team: FIVB World Championship: 1960 – (gold) st, 1962 – (gold) st. Head coach of the Soviet Union women's national team: Olympic Games: 1968 – (gold) st, 1972 – (gold) st. FIVB World Championship: 1970 – (gold) st. FIVB World Cup: 1973 – (gold) st. He is one of the few persons to have won FIVB World Championship gold medals as a player and as a head coach.	
2003	Julio Velasco	February 9, 1952	Argentina; Italy	Head coach of the Italy men's national team (1989–1996): Olympic Games: 1992 – 5th, 1996 – (silver) nd. FIVB World Championship: 1990 – (gold) st, 1994 – (gold) st. FIVB World Cup: 1989 – (silver) nd, 1995 – (gold) st. Head coach of the Italy women's national team (1996–1997, 2024–): Olympic Games: 2024 – (gold) st. Head coach of the Czech Republic men's national team (2001–2002): FIVB World Championship: 2002 – 13th. Head coach of the Spain men's national team (2008–2010): FIVB World Championship: 2010 – 12th. Head coach of the Iran men's national team (2011–2014): FIVB World Cup: 2011 – 9th. Head coach of the Argentina men's national team (2014–2018): Olympic Games: 2016 – 5th. FIVB World Championship: 2014 – 11th, 2018 – 15th. FIVB World Cup: 2015 – 5th.	
2005	Eugenio George	March 29, 1933	Cuba	Head coach of the Cuba women's national team: Olympic Games: 1976 – 5th, 1980 – 5th, 1992 – (gold) st, 1996 – (gold) st, 2000 – (gold) st. FIVB World Championship: 1978 – (gold) st, 1994 – (gold) st, 1998 – (gold) st. FIVB World Cup: 1989 – (gold) st, 1991 – (gold) st, 1995 – (gold) st, 1999 – (gold) st. He is the first head coach to lead national teams to win three Olympic gold medals.	
2006	Shigeo Yamada	October 26, 1931	Japan	Head coach of the Japan women's national team: Olympic Games: 1968 – (silver) nd, 1972 – (bronze) rd, 1976 – (gold) st, 1984 – (bronze) rd, 1988 – 4th. FIVB World Championship: 1974 – (gold) st. FIVB World Cup: 1977 – (gold) st.	
2007	Yuan Weimin	July 8, 1939	China	Head coach of the China women's national team (1976–1984): Olympic Games: 1984 – (gold) st. FIVB World Championship: 1978 – 6th, 1982 – (gold) st. FIVB World Cup: 1977 – 4th, 1981 – (gold) st.	
2009	Nikolay Karpol	May 1, 1938	Soviet Union; Russia	Head coach of the Soviet Union women's national team: Olympic Games: 1980 – (gold) st, 1988 – (gold) st. FIVB World Championship: 1990 – (gold) st. FIVB World Cup: 1989 – (silver) nd, 1991 – (bronze) rd. Head coach of the CIS women's national team: Olympic Games: 1992 – (silver) nd. Head coach of the Russia women's national team: Olympic Games: 1996 – 4th, 2000 – (silver) nd, 2004 – (silver) nd. FIVB World Championship: 1994 – (silver) nd, 1998 – (silver) nd, 2002 – (silver) nd. FIVB World Cup: 1999 – (silver) nd. He is the first head coach to lead national teams to win five Olympic medals.	

==== 2010–2019 (8 persons) ====
Year	Name	Born	Nationality	Major achievements	Ref.
2010	Gabriella Kotsis	May 31, 1928	Hungary	Indoor player: FIVB World Championship: 1952 – 6th. Head coach of the Hungary women's national team: Olympic Games: 1972 – 5th, 1976 – 4th, 1980 – 4th. She is the first female head coach to lead national teams to three Olympics.	
2010	Hubert Wagner	March 4, 1941	Poland	Indoor player: Olympic Games: 1968 – 5th (Captain). FIVB World Championship: 1966 – 6th, 1970 – 5th. FIVB World Cup: 1969 – 8th. Head coach of the Poland men's national team (1973–1976, 1983–1985, 1996–1998): Olympic Games: 1976 – (gold) st. FIVB World Championship: 1974 – (gold) st. Head coach of the Poland women's national team (1978–1979): FIVB World Championship: 1978 – 11th.	
2014	Joop Alberda	October 25, 1951	Netherlands	Head coach of the Netherlands men's national team (1994–1996): Olympic Games: 1996 – (gold) st. FIVB World Championship: 1994 – (silver) nd. FIVB World Cup: 1995 – (silver) nd.	
2015	Bebeto de Freitas	January 15, 1950	Brazil	Indoor player: Olympic Games: 1972 – 8th, 1976 – 7th. Head coach of the Brazil men's national team (1980–1984, 1987–1990): Olympic Games: 1984 – (silver) nd, 1988 – 4th. FIVB World Championship: 1982 – (silver) nd, 1990 – 4th. FIVB World Cup: 1981 – (bronze) rd, 1989 – 5th. Head coach of the Italy men's national team (1996–1999): FIVB World Championship: 1998 – (gold) st.	
2016	Park Man-bok	August 30, 1936	South Korea	Head coach of the South Korea women's national team (1973): FIVB World Cup: 1973 – (bronze) rd. Head coach of the Peru women's national team (1974–1992, 1999–2001): Olympic Games: 1976 – 7th, 1980 – 6th, 1984 – 4th, 1988 – (silver) nd, 2000 – 11th. FIVB World Championship: 1974 – 8th, 1978 – 10th, 1982 – (silver) nd, 1986 – (bronze) rd, 1990 – 6th. FIVB World Cup: 1985 – 5th, 1989 – 5th, 1991 – 5th, 1999 – 10th.	
2017	Anders Kristiansson	April 7, 1949	Sweden	Head coach of the Sweden men's national team: Olympic Games: 1988 – 7th. FIVB World Championship: 1990 – 10th, 1994 – 16th.	
2018	Hugh McCutcheon	October 13, 1969	New Zealand	Head coach of the United States men's national team (2005–2008): Olympic Games: 2008 – (gold) st. FIVB World Championship: 2006 – 10th. FIVB World Cup: 2007 – 4th. Head coach of the United States women's national team (2008–2012): Olympic Games: 2012 – (silver) nd. FIVB World Championship: 2010 – 4th. FIVB World Cup: 2011 – (silver) nd. He is one of few head coaches to lead national teams to win Olympic medals with both genders.	
2019	Vasil Simov	January 12, 1934	Bulgaria	Indoor player: 1970 – (silver) rd. Head coach of the Bulgaria women's national team: Olympic Games: 1980 – (silver) rd.	

==== 2020–2029 (5 persons) ====
Year	Name	Born	Nationality	Major achievements	Ref.
2022	Bernardo "Bernardinho" Rezende	August 25, 1959	Brazil	Indoor player: Olympic Games: 1984 – (silver) nd. FIVB World Championship: 1982 – (silver) nd. Head coach of the Brazil women's national team: Olympic Games: 1996 – (bronze) rd, 2000 – (bronze) rd. FIVB World Championship: 1994 – (silver) nd. Head coach of the Brazil men's national team: Olympic Games: 2004 – (gold) st, 2008 – (silver) nd, 2012 – (silver) nd, 2016 – (gold) st. FIVB World Championship: 2002 – (gold) st, 2006 – (gold) st, 2010 – (gold) st. He is the first and only head coach to lead national teams to win six Olympic medals. He's one of few head coaches to lead national teams to win Olympic medals with both genders. Leading teams to win more than 30 major volleyball titles, and with 48 medals won in total, he is considered the most successful team sport coach of all time.	
2023	Silvano Prandi	November 13, 1947	Italy	Head coach of the Italy men's national team: Olympic Games: 1984 – (bronze) rd. Head coach of the Bulgaria men's national team.	
2024	Jose Roberto Guimarães (Zé Roberto)	July 31, 1954	Brazil	Head coach of the Brazil men's national team: Olympic Games: 1992 – (gold) st. Head coach of the Brazil women's national team: Olympic Games: 2008 – (gold) st, 2012 – (gold) st, 2020 – (silver) nd, 2024 – (bronze) rd. FIVB World Championship: 2006 – (silver) nd, 2010 – (silver) nd, 2014 – (bronze) rd, 2022 – (silver) nd. He is among the few head coaches to lead national teams to win five Olympic medals. He's one of few head coaches to lead national teams to win Olympic medals with both genders.	
2025	Jürgen Wagner		Germany	Head coach of the Germany men's beach volleyball team (Brink/Reckermann): Olympic Games: 2012 – (gold) st. Head coach of the Germany women's beach volleyball team (Ludwig/Walkenhorst): Olympic Games: 2016 – (gold) st.	
2026	Laurent Tillie	December 1, 1963	France	Head coach of the France men's national team: Olympic Games: 2020 – (gold) st.	

=== Volleyball leaders and officials (32 persons) ===
==== 1985–1999 (14 persons) ====
Year	Name	Born	Nationality	Major achievements	Ref.
1985	William G. Morgan	January 23, 1870	United States	He is the inventor of volleyball, and the inaugural member of the Volleyball Hall of Fame.	
1986	Dr. Harold T. Friermood	September 14, 1902	United States	He is the man who brought volleyball to the Olympics. Beginning in 1944, he was a tireless advocate of getting volleyball into the Olympic Games. He was a former FIVB Vice President (1951–1960). He is the second member of the Volleyball Hall of Fame.	
1988	Leonard Gibson	July 24, 1903	United States		
1989	Glen Davies	May 21, 1925	United States	He served as a model of excellence within the world of volleyball refereeing. He was the only official to be assigned to the first four Olympic Games, including two gold medal competitions.	
1990	Alton Fish	May 13, 1916	United States		
1991	Dr. George J. Fisher	April 2, 1871	United States		
1991	Catalino Ignacio	November 25, 1919	United States		
1992	Merton H. Kennedy	April 10, 1908	United States		
1994	John Koch	March 16, 1911	United States		
1995	Robert L. Lindsay	May 3, 1914	United States		
1995	C.L. (Bobb) Miller	November 10, 1921	United States		
1997	Albert Monaco Jr.	July 2, 1938	United States		
1998	William Baird	September 21, 1925	United States		
1999	Wilbur H. Peck	April 9, 1930	United States		

==== 2000–2019 (9 persons) ====
Year	Name	Born	Nationality	Major achievements	Ref.
2006	Endre Holvay	November 4, 1918	Hungary	He was a former FIVB Vice President (1959–1961, 1970–1972).	
2007	Carlos Arthur Nuzman	March 17, 1942	Brazil	Indoor player: Olympic Games: 1964 – 7th. FIVB World Championship: 1962 – 10th, 1966 – 13th.	
2008	Sinan Erdem	May 9, 1927	Turkey		
2008	Vladimir Savvine	October 25, 1919	Soviet Union; Russia	Indoor player: FIVB World Championship: 1949 – (gold) st.	
2009	Paul Libaud	1905	France	He was one of the founders of the Fédération Internationale de Volleyball (FIVB), representing France at the inaugural FIVB organizational meeting in April 1947. He was the 1st President of the FIVB (1947–1984). He succeeded in getting Olympic recognition for the sport of volleyball, with the inclusion of both men and women’s volleyball at the 1964 Summer Olympics.	
2011	František Stibitz	April 15, 1917	Czechoslovakia; Czech Republic	He was one of the founders of the Fédération Internationale de Volleyball (FIVB), representing Czechoslovakia at the inaugural FIVB organizational meeting in April 1947.	
2014	Miloslav Ejem	November 5, 1935	Czechoslovakia; Czech Republic		
2017	Wei Jizhong	November 12, 1936	China	He was the 3rd President of the FIVB (2008–2012).	
2018	Hiroshi Toyoda	October 14, 1933	Japan		

==== 2020–2029 (9 persons) ====
Year	Name	Born	Nationality	Major achievements	Ref.
2021	André Meyer	March 10, 1944	Luxembourg		
2022	Peter Murphy	1947	Netherlands		
2023	Shanrit Wongprasert	December 16, 1943	Thailand		
2024	Sue Lemaire		United States		
2024	Giuseppe Panini	November 9, 1925	Italy		
2024	Juan Ángel Pereyra		Argentina		
2025	Guillermo "Willy" Paredes		Argentina		
2026	Ary Graça	April 23, 1943	Brazil	He was the 4th President of the FIVB (2012–2024).	
2026	Takashi Shimoyama	January 2, 1949	Japan	Referee in three Olympic Games (1992, 1996 and 2000).	

== Inductees by country ==
The following table enumerates all of the inductees to the Volleyball Hall of Fame through 2026.

Nation	Number	Male player	Female player	Coach	Leader and official
United States	70	1988: Eugene Selznick - 1989: Michael O'Hara - 1991: Rolf Engen, Thomas Haine - 1992: Ron Von Hagen, Jon Stanley - 1993: Mike Bright - 1994: Larry Rundle - 1997: Pedro Velasco - 1998: Craig Buck, Dusty Dvorak, Steve Timmons - 1999: James G. Wortham - 2000: Harold Wendt - 2001: Karch Kiraly - 2003: Sinjin Smith - 2005: Ron Lang - 2006: Bernie Holtzman - 2007: Bob Ctvrtlik - 2008: Randy Stoklos - 2012: Mike Dodd, Jeff Stork - 2015: Lloy Ball - 2021: Todd Rogers, Clay Stanley - 2023: Phil Dalhausser - 2024: Tim Hovland - 2025: Kent Steffes	1988: Flo Hyman, Jane Ward - 1989: Kathy Gregory - 1990: Mary Jo Peppler - 1994: Patty Dowdell - 1995: Debbie Green - 1996: Patricia Bright - 1998: Paula Weishoff - 2001: Jean Gaertner - 2004: Karolyn Kirby - 2009: Holly McPeak - 2011: Rita Crockett - 2013: Caren Kemner - 2014: Tara Cross-Battle - 2016: Misty May-Treanor, Danielle Scott-Arruda - 2021: Logan Tom - 2022: Kerri Walsh Jennings - 2026: April Ross	1988: Harry Wilson - 1989: Douglas Beal - 1990: Col. Edward DeGroot - 1992: Dr. James Coleman - 1993: Al Scates - 1994: Marv Dunphy - 1996: Donald Shondell - 1997: Andy Banachowski	1985: William G. Morgan - 1986: Dr. Harold T. Friermood - 1988: Leonard Gibson - 1989: Glen Davies - 1990: Alton Fish - 1991: Dr. George J. Fisher, Catalino Ignacio - 1992: Merton H. Kennedy - 1994: John Koch - 1995: Robert L. Lindsay, C.L. (Bobb) Miller - 1997: Albert Monaco Jr. - 1998: William Baird - 1999: Wilbur H. Peck - 2024: Sue Lemaire
Brazil	27	2005: Bernard Rajzman - 2012: Mauricio Lima - 2014: Nalbert Bitencourt - 2015: Renan Dal Zotto - 2016: Emanuel Rego - 2017: José Loiola - 2018: Gilberto (Giba) Godoy Filho - 2019: Zé Marco de Melo - 2021: Giovane Gávio, Ricardo Santos, Sérgio Santos - 2026: Alison Cerutti	2006: Jacqueline "Jackie" Silva - 2009: Ana Moser - 2010: Shelda Bede, Adriana Behar - 2014: Sandra Pires - 2015: Hélia Souza Pinto (Fofão) - 2022: Fernanda Venturini - 2023: Larissa França - 2024: Ana Paula Henkel - 2026: Fabiana Alvim	2015: Bebeto de Freitas - 2022: Bernardo Rezende - 2024: Jose Roberto Guimarães	2007: Carlos Arthur Nuzman - 2026: Ary Graça
Russia	18	2000: Yuri Chesnokov - 2005: Konstantin Reva - 2010: Aleksandr Savin - 2012: Georgy Mondzolevski - 2013: Vyacheslav Zaytsev - 2021: Sergey Tetyukhin	2000: Inna Ryskal - 2006: Nina Smoleeva - 2012: Lyudmila Buldakova - 2014: Rosa Salikhova - 2017: Irina Kirillova - 2018: Evgeniya Artamonova Estes - 2019: Valentina Ogiyenko - 2026: Yekaterina Gamova	2002: Viacheslav Platonov - 2003: Givi Akhvlediani - 2009: Nikolay Karpol	2008: Vladimir Savvine
Japan	10	2003: Jungo Morita - 2004: Seiji Oko - 2023: Katsutoshi Nekoda	2000: Takako Shirai - 2008: Masae Kasai	1998: Yasutaka Matsudaira - 2000: Hirofumi Daimatsu - 2006: Shigeo Yamada	2018: Hiroshi Toyoda - 2026: Takashi Shimoyama
Cuba	9	2026: Joël Despaigne	2001: Regla Torres - 2004: Mireya Luis - 2011: Magaly Carvajal - 2019: Mirka Francia - 2021: Taismary Agüero - 2023: Yumilka Ruiz - 2024: Regla Bell	2005: Eugenio George	
Italy	9	2007: Andrea Gardini - 2008: Andrea Giani - 2011: Lorenzo Bernardi - 2022: Samuele Papi - 2024: Andrea Zorzi	2025: Francesca Piccinini	2003: Julio Velasco - 2023: Silvano Prandi	2024: Giuseppe Panini
Netherlands	6	2012: Peter Blangé - 2017: Ronald Zwerver - 2018: Bas van de Goor		2014: Joop Alberda	2022: Pieter Joon, Peter Murphy
Bulgaria	4	2007: Dimitar Zlatanov - 2019: Boris Gyuderov - 2025: Dimitar Karov		2019: Vasil Simov	
Czech Republic	4	2004: Josef Musil - 2019: Josef Tesar			2011: Dr. Frantisek Stibitz - 2014: Miloslav Ejem
Poland	4	2002: Tomasz Wójtowicz - 2005: Stanisław Gościniak - 2006: Edward Skorek		2010: Hubert Wagner	
Argentina	3	2011: Hugo Conte			2024: Juan Ángel Pereyra - 2025: Guillermo "Willy" Paredes
Australia	3		2007: Kerri Pottharst - 2013: Natalie Cook		2025: Barry Couzner
China	3		2002: "Jenny" Lang Ping	2007: Yuan Weimin	2017: Wei Jizhong
Germany	3	2009: Siegfried Schneider	2025: Laura Ludwig	2025: Jürgen Wagner	
Peru	3		2005: Cecilia Tait - 2010: Gabriela Pérez del Solar - 2025: Rosa García Rivas		
Serbia	3	2011: Vladimir Grbić - 2016: Nikola Grbić - 2025: Ivan Miljković			
France	2			2026: Laurent Tillie	2009: Paul Libaud
Hungary	2			2010: Gabriella Kotsis	2006: Endre Holvay
Iran	1			2024: Hadi Rezaei	
Israel	1				1995: Arie Selinger
Jersey	1				2026: Denis Le Breuilly
Latvia	1	2009: Ivan Bugajenkov			
Luxembourg	1				2021: André Meyer
New Zealand	1			2018: Hugh McCutcheon	
South Korea	1			2016: Park Man Bok	
Sweden	1			2017: Anders Kristiansson	
Thailand	1				2023: Shanrit Wongprasert
Turkey	1				2008: Sinan Erdem
Ukraine	1	2008: Yuri Poyarkov			

== See also ==
- Major achievements in volleyball by nation
- Fédération Internationale de Volleyball
