= Volleyball at the 1963 Pan American Games =

This page presents the results of the men's and women's volleyball tournament during the 1963 Pan American Games, which was held from April 24 to May 3, 1963, in São Paulo, Brazil.

== Men's indoor tournament ==
=== Final ranking ===
Place	Team
1.	Brazil: Carlos Eduardo Albano Feitosa; Décio Viotti de Azevedo; Fábio Starling de Carvalho; Giuseppe Mezzasalma; Newdon Emanuel de Victor; Roque Midlej Maron; João Cláudio França; Josias de Oliveira Ramalho; Luiz Roberto Lima de Moraes; Marco Antônio Volpi; Pedro Barbosa de Andrade; Victor Mário Barcellos Borges; Coach: Sami Mehlinsky
2.	United States: Mike Bright; Harlan Cohen; Michael O'Hara; Peter Colbert; Charles Nelson; Walter Schiller; Barry Brown; Haine; Milton Friedman; Pedro Velasco; Darwin; Willem Van der Meer
3.	Argentina: Ramos; Florentino; Soraequlilla; Giudice; Arlandine; Rafael; Abajo
4.	Venezuela: Rodriguez; Molero; Vina; Medina; Molina; Marques; Borges; Ledi; Planchart; Prada; Landaetta
5.	Chile: Grisanti; Goya; Hugo; H. Grizanti; Gomes; Blanco; Del Vale; Gaston; Sanchez; Goya
6.	Uruguay: Farcilli; Martinez; Morales; Urrutia; Petrocelli; Carlos Farcilli; Leoni; Salsberry
7.	Mexico: Arroyo; Contreras; Vasques; Raycona; Beltran; Nava; Dominguez; Alarcon; Meyer
8.	Canada: Zups; McLanghlin; Richken; Aldma; Tiffins; Lejas

1963 Pan American Games winners

Brazil
First title

== Women's indoor tournament ==
=== Final ranking ===
Place	Team
1.	Brazil: Elda Maria da Silva Pimenta; Eunice Rondino; Joana Mary Freire de Carvalho e Silva; Corina Von Lasperg; Leila Fernandes Peixoto; Lia Savignia de Freitas; Marina Conceição Celistre; Marlene Djinishian; Norma Rosa Vaz; Tânia Lobo Fagundes; Vera Trezoitko; Zilda Ulbrich (Coca)
2.	United States: Jane Russell; Patti Lucas-Bright; Jean Gaertner; Jayne Herwig; Jeanette Hobbs; Johnette Latreille; Lou Sara Clark-McWilliams; Beverly Miller; Linda Murphy; Nancy Owen; Mary Perry; Bonnie Pride; Jane Ward; Coach: Gene Selznick
3.	Mexico: M. Lerna; Graziela; Isabel; Guadalupe; Hortensia; Rosa Maria; Virginia; Alicia; Georgina

1963 Pan American Games winners

Brazil
Second title
