= Charles Nelson (volleyball) =

American volleyball player (born 1933)

Medal record

Men's volleyball

Representing the United States

Pan American Games
Gold medal – first place	1959 Chicago	Team
Silver medal – second place	1963 São Paulo	Team

Charles Tomlinson Nelson (born April 14, 1933 in Topeka, Kansas) is an American former volleyball player who competed in the 1964 Summer Olympics in Tokyo, Japan.
