= Harlan Cohen =

American volleyball coach (1934–2020)

Personal information
- Born: November 6, 1934; Los Angeles, California, U.S.
- Died: March 19, 2020 (aged 85)

Coaching information
Previous teams coached
Years	Teams
1967–1968; 1975–1976; 1986–1991	Women's national team Pepperdine; UCLA
Medal record
Men's volleyball
Representing the United States
Pan American Games
Silver medal – second place	1963 São Paulo	Team

Harlan Cohen (November 6, 1934 – March 19, 2020) was an American volleyball coach who led both the United States men's and women's national teams during the mid-1960s.

As a player, Cohen was a member of Team USA's volleyball team at the 1965 Maccabiah Games in Israel, along with Gene Selznick, who had played on world championship teams.

Cohen coached the men in 1966. He coached the women to a gold medal at the 1967 Pan American Games and a silver medal at the 1967 World Championships in Tokyo. He was head coach of the USA women's team for the 1968 Summer Olympics in Mexico City.

Cohen coached at Santa Monica College alongside Burt DeGroot from 1961 to 1972. Their teams won seven USA Volleyball (USVBA) college championships. He later was the head coach at Pepperdine University from 1975 to 1976 where his team won the USVBA championship in 1975.

== Recognition ==
- In 1990 he was inducted into the Southern California Jewish Sports Hall of Fame.
- Cohen received the George J. Fisher Leader in Volleyball Award from USA Volleyball in 1999.
- In 2000, he was awarded an All-Time Great Volleyball Coach Award from USA Volleyball.

== Sources ==
- Ronberg, Gary (June 5, 1967). "Playing It The Japanese Way". Sports Illustrated. 26 (23): 30–32.
- Press Release (March 28, 2003). "USA Volleyball announces 75th Anniversary All-Era Coaches". USA Volleyball. Archived from the original on March 16, 2009.
- Biography at the Southern California Jewish Sports Hall of Fame
