= Rita Crockett =

American volleyball player

Personal information
- Full name: Rita Louise Crockett (-Buck)
- Nickname: The Rocket
- Born: Rita Louise Crockett; November 2, 1957 (age 68); San Antonio, Texas, U.S.
- Height: 5 ft 9 in (1.75 m)
- Weight: 141 lb (64 kg)

Volleyball information
- Position: Outside hitter
- Number: 3

National team
1978–1984	United States
Medal record
Event	1st	2nd	3rd
Olympic Games	0	1	0
Pan American Games	0	1	0
World Championship	0	0	1
Total	0	2	1
Women's volleyball
Representing United States
Olympic Games
Silver medal – second place	1984 Los Angeles	Team
World Championship
Bronze medal – third place	1982 Peru	{{{2}}}
Pan American Games
Silver medal – second place	1983 Caracas	Team

Rita Louise Crockett (born November 2, 1957) is an American former volleyball player who played for the United States women's national volleyball team. Crockett was a silver medalist at the 1984 Summer Olympics in Los Angeles. She also won a bronze medal at the 1982 FIVB World Championship in Peru and a silver medal at the 1983 Pan American Games in Caracas.

Though Crockett is only 5 ft 9 in (1.75 m), she was able to dunk a basketball on a 10' rim. This exceptional vertical jump gave her a competitive advantage against taller players on the volleyball court, and it was why she was given the nickname "The Rocket".

In 2011, Crockett was inducted into the International Volleyball Hall of Fame.

== College ==
Crockett played college volleyball with the Houston Cougars, and was an AIAW All-American in 1977.

Crockett was inducted into the University of Houston Athletics Hall of Honor in 2008.

== Club volleyball ==
Internationally, Crockett played in Japan, Switzerland, and Italy over 16 years. She was a teammate of fellow Olympian Flo Hyman with Daiei in the Japanese V.League, and led her team to a championship title in 1986. In 1991, she was MVP of the Italian Women's Volleyball League with Matera, and helped Rome win the European Club Championship in 1993.

== Beach volleyball ==
Between 1989 and 1994, Crockett played professional beach volleyball, winning $90,000 in prizes. In 1989, she won the World Beach Volleyball Championship of the Women's Professional Volleyball Association with Jackie Silva as her partner. She was selected as the AVP Sportswoman of the Year in 1993 and 1994.

== Coaching ==
Crockett was the executive director, president, and head coach of the North Florida Volleyball Association, and is now the head coach of indoor and beach volleyball at Florida International University.

Crockett is known professionally by her married name, Rita Buck-Crockett.

== Awards ==
- AIAW All-American — 1977
- FIVB World Championship bronze medal — 1982
- Pan American Games silver medal — 1983
- Olympic silver medal — 1984
- Japan V. League Champion — 1986
- World Beach Volleyball Champion — 1989
- Italian Women's Volleyball League MVP — 1991
- European Club Champion — 1993
- Two-time AVP Sportswoman of the Year — 1993, 1994
- University of Houston Athletics Hall of Honor — 2008
- International Volleyball Hall of Fame — 2011
