= Rolf Engen =

American sports person and businessman

Rolf Julius Engen (August 5, 1929 – July 31, 2018) was an American businessman, inventor, basketball player, volleyball player, coach, and entrepreneur in the American fine wine market.

Initially recruited by UCLA coach John Wooden to play basketball on scholarship in 1950, Engen later transitioned to volleyball. A founding member of UCLA's men's volleyball team, Engen was twice selected as first-team All-American, won two National Collegiate Championships, was a nine-time USA Volleyball National Open Champion, a 10-time All-American (consecutively 1953–1962), and 1960 USA Volleyball's Most Valuable Player. Engen won the USA Volleyball All-Time Great Player Award in 1966, was inducted into the Southern California Indoor Volleyball Hall of Fame in 2017, was inducted into the Volleyball Hall of Fame in 1991, and he served as Commissioner of Volleyball at the 1984 Los Angeles Olympic Games.

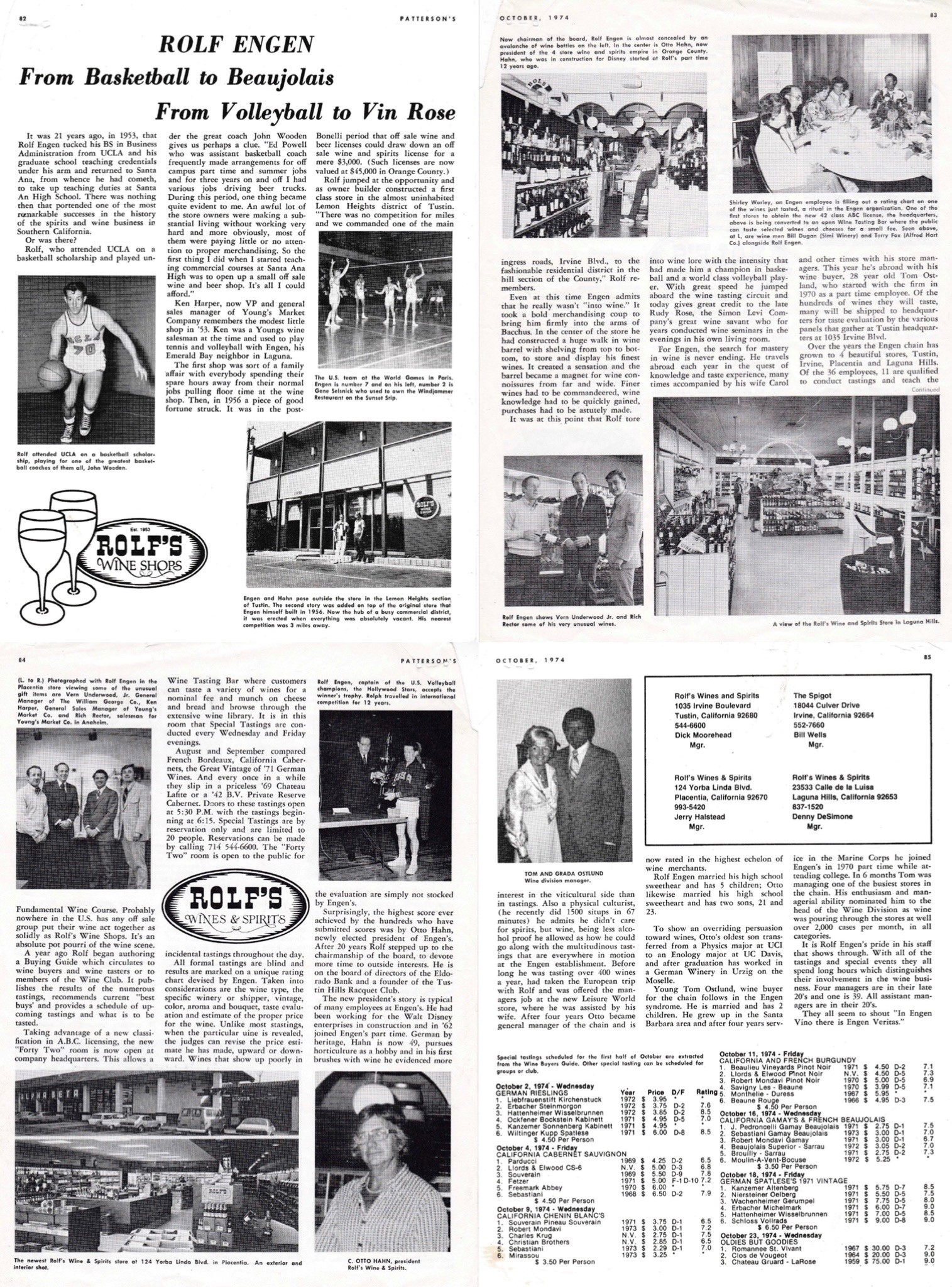
"Rolf Engen From Basketball to Beaujolais, From Volleyball to Vin Rose," Oct 1974; A Patterson's Guide October 1974 issue featuring Rolf Engen's business evolution in Orange County, California

== Early life and playing career ==
Rolf Engen was born in Minneapolis, Minnesota; he later moved with his family to Santa Ana, California, where he attended Santa Ana Elementary School. Engen began playing volleyball at the Santa Ana YMCA as a teenager in 1947. He was an All-Army setter while stationed with the U.S. Army at Fort Lewis south of Tacoma, Washington.

Engen attended Santa Ana College (SAC) from 1947 through 1950, setting an Eastern Conference record of 18.8 points per game while being named First-Team All-Conference. After graduating from SAC with a degree in business, he was offered a scholarship to UCLA, and in 1950 was recruited to the basketball program by John Wooden. An automobile accident was the cause of his transitional change from basketball to volleyball. He served as both player and coach for the 1953 and 1954 volleyball teams at UCLA, led the Bruins to two consecutive USVBA national championships, and was named First-Team All-Conference both years.

Engen joined the Hollywood YMCA team with other former Bruins and played on eight USVBA Open Championship Teams, was named All-American 10 times (consecutively 1953–1962), and was the 1960 US Open MVP. Engen won gold medals at the 1955 and 1959 Pan-American Games (in Mexico City and Chicago respectively) and was a member of the fifth-place team at the World Games in Paris in 1960. Engen later achieved the National Open Gold in 1964 and in 1966 was named U.S. Volleyball Association All-Time Great Player.

Engen later began to coach. Beginning in the 1970s, he became a coach at Laguna Beach High School (winning two CIF championships and coaching Dusty Dvorak), formed the Laguna Beach Volleyball Club, and coached the boys' team to two silver and three gold medals at the AAU Junior Olympics from 1975 to 1979

In 1984, Engen was appointed Commissioner for Volleyball for the Los Angeles 1984 Summer Olympics, during which the US Team won its first gold medal. Engen was inducted into the International Volleyball Hall of Fame in 1991 and was thereafter named to the 1953–78 All-Era team for the years. Engen was also later inducted into the Southern California Indoor Volleyball Hall of Fame in 2017.

Engen also played tennis, which he referred to as “the sport of a lifetime.”

== Business career ==
Engen founded Rolf's Wine & Spirits (originally incorporated as Rolf's Grocery via Rolf Engen Inc.) in 1953 in the citriculture hub of Tustin, California following a five-year period of teaching at Santa Ana High School. Rolf's was the first wine and spirits store in Orange County, California as well as one of the first to be founded in California.

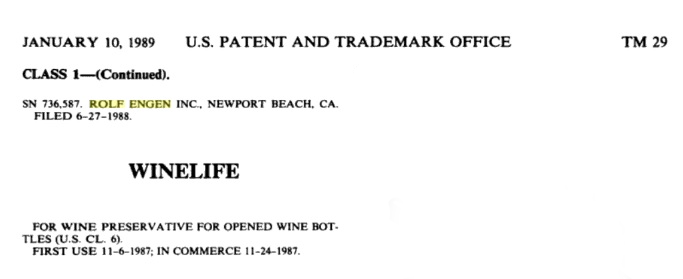
An image of Rolf Engen's 1989 Winelife patent, United States Patent and Trademark Office

His wine business expanded to Newport Beach, Placentia, Laguna Hills, Orange, and Irvine. He traveled in Europe in the 1960s, and was among the first importers of European wines to Orange County.

He began to develop other wine businesses later in life, filing patents for wine tools, dispensers, preservatives, and services.

Engen was a director and vice chairman of the board of El Dorado Bank in Tustin. El Dorado Bank was acquired by Commerce Security in 1996.

In 2018, Wine Business Monthly called him "the face of wine for southern California for 6 decades." Later in life, Engen sold his retail business, now a division of Santa Ana-based Spectrum Wine, now located in the greater South Coast Metro shopping and business district.

== Death ==
Engen died on July 31, 2018, in Laguna Beach, California.
