= CollegeWeekLive =

CollegeWeekLive is a free, online college fair which features approximately one hundred and fifty colleges and universities worldwide. These virtual college fairs offer a convenient way for students, parents, and educators to interact with college admissions counselors. On average, CollegeWeekLive experiences over 1 million visitors each year. CollegeWeekLive hosts online admissions events throughout the year where CollegeWeekLive website visitors can watch video presentations which feature admissions experts, and participate in live video and text chats. CollegeWeekLive has monthly and event scholarships.

== Features ==
Each CollegeWeekLive fair includes keynote presentations, information on student financial aid, college admission trends and live interactive question and answer discussions with admission representations. Participants can also video chat with students currently enrolled in selected colleges who offer their options and perspective on their schools and college life.

CollegeWeekLive has partnered with the College Board and Federal Student Aid, an office of the U.S. Department of Education, AVID, and the United States Department of State and Univision to deliver information to parents and students on the college application process as well as scholarship and financial aid tools to assist students and parents.

== High School Connect ==
High School Connect is an invitation tool which high school educators can use to schedule time for their students to chat live with college admissions counselors from any of the participating colleges. High School Connect is free and CollegeWeekLive offers free phone support for educators.

== Events ==
CollegeWeekLive hosts virtual events year round. These include monthly college fairs, topical events such as Study Abroad Day, International Day, STEM/Health Sciences Day, or Transfer Day and events which feature a specific college.

== Speakers ==
Each virtual event features video chat and keynote speakers. Recent speakers have included Harlan Cohen, author of "The Naked Roommate", Lynn O'Shaughnessy, blogger for CBS MoneyWatch, Dr. Gary Gruber, author of "The Gruber Guide" and Elizabeth Scott, About.com writer and life coach.

== History ==
The first CollegeWeekLive online college fair was in November 2007. The company expanded the number and type of college admissions events offered each subsequent year. Each online college fair has featured 20–60 hours of live presentations from admissions experts. CollegeWeekLive makes this content available to audiences on demand if they are unable to attend the live show.

In October 2012 the company announced the CollegeWeekLive Advisor Center, an online resource designed for high school guidance counselors that features lesson plans and videos tailored to aiding students in the college search process.

In January 2013 the company expanded its executive team.

In April 2013 the company released the College Chat mobile application to the Google Play store, to lukewarm reviews, and an average rating of 2.9 stars out of 5.

In fall 2013, CollegeWeekLive becomes an approved credit provider through the National Board for Certified Counselors. Counselors can now earn free credit contact hours toward their national certification on CollegeWeekLive for watching videos live or on demand.

In January 2014, CollegeWeekLive updated their website from a flash-based environment to an HTML5 environment.

September 2014, the Advisor center is replaced by High School Connect.

== Press ==
CollegeWeekLive has been featured in the media including ABC News, The Washington Post, Fox 25 News, the San Francisco Chronicle, Business Week, USA Today and The New York Times.
