= Boris Gyuderov =

Bulgarian volleyball player

Personal information
- Nationality: Bulgarian
- Born: 12 February 1927; Pernik, Bulgaria
- Died: 23 May 2001 (aged 74)
- Height: 189 cm (6 ft 2 in)

Coaching information
Previous teams coached
Years	Teams
1952–1960; 1954–1967; 1964; 1969–1970	Minyor Pernik (women); Minyor Pernik; Bulgaria (assistant); Levski Sofia

Volleyball information
- Number: 8

Career
Years	Teams
1946–1967	Minyor Pernik
Honours
Men's volleyball
Representing Bulgaria
World Championship
Bronze medal – third place	1949 Czechoslovakia
Bronze medal – third place	1952 Soviet Union
European Championship
Silver medal – second place	1951 Paris
Bronze medal – third place	1955 Bucharest

Boris Gyuderov (Bulgarian: Борис Гюдеров, 12 February 1927 – 23 May 2001) was a Bulgarian volleyball player. He competed in the men's tournament at the 1964 Summer Olympics. He also was part of the Bulgarian team in three World Championships and five European Championships. He was the captain of the Bulgarian team for 15 years. In 2019, he was posthumously inducted to the International Volleyball Hall of Fame.
