= Dimitar Karov =

Bulgarian volleyball player

Personal information
- Full name: Dimitar Lyukov Karov
- Born: 27 November 1943 (age 82); Sofia, Bulgaria
- Height: 173 cm (5 ft 8 in)

Volleyball information
- Position: Setter
- Number: 8

Career
Years	Teams
1958 – 1961	(Bulgaria) Septemvri Sofia
1961 – 1972	(Bulgaria) CSKA
1972 – 1975	(Italy) CUS Torino

National team
1963–1978	Bulgaria
Honours
Men's volleyball
Representing Bulgaria
World Championship
Silver medal – second place	1970 Bulgaria	{{{2}}}

Dimitar Karov (Bulgarian: Димитър Каров; born 27 November 1943) is a Bulgarian former volleyball player and three-time Olympian. Karov competed with the Bulgarian men's national volleyball team at the 1964 Summer Olympics in Tokyo, the 1968 Summer Olympics in Mexico City, and the 1972 Summer Olympics in Munich as a setter. He helped Bulgaria win the silver medal at the 1970 FIVB World Championship in Bulgaria.

Despite his relatively short stature at 173 cm (5 ft 8 in), Karov was able to compete at the highest levels due in part to his 105 cm (41-inch) vertical jump.

Karov won the prestigious CEV Lifetime Achievement Award in 2019.

In 2025, he was inducted into the International Volleyball Hall of Fame.

== Club volleyball ==
Karov helped the Bulgarian club team CSKA to five championship titles as a player and two as a coach. He also won the Trofeo Gazzetta (MVP) in the Italian League in 1974, 1975, and 1976 while playing for CUS Torino.
