= Gabriella Kotsis =

Hungarian indoor volleyball coach (1928–2023)

Gabriella Kotsis (31 May 1928 – 17 August 2023) was a Hungarian indoor volleyball coach. Along with Lang Ping, she was one of only two women volleyball coaches to lead teams at multiple Olympics. Kotsis coached Hungary at the 1972 Olympic Games in Munich, the 1976 Olympic Games in Montreal and the 1980 Olympic Games in Moscow. In 2010, Kotsis was named into the Volleyball Hall of Fame.

== Career ==
Kotsis was born in Budapest, Hungary on 31 May 1928. As a youth, she competed in indoor volleyball at the 1950 European Championship and the first women's FIVB World Championship in 1952 in Moscow, leading Hungary to a sixth-place finish. Following her retirement from playing, Kotsis coached Hungary at the 1972 Summer Olympics, the 1976 Summer Olympics, and the 1980 Summer Olympics, becoming the only female to lead teams to three Olympics. Likewise, she is one of only two women volleyball coaches to lead teams at multiple Olympics, along with Lang Ping. In recognition of her efforts, Kotsis was inducted into the Volleyball Hall of Fame in 2010.

Kotsis died in Budapest on 17 August 2023, at the age of 95.
