= Linda Murphy (volleyball) =

American volleyball player (born 1943)

Personal information
- Full name: Linda Kathleen Murphy
- Born: September 3, 1943 (age 83); Glendale, California, U.S.
- Height: 188 cm (6 ft 2 in)
Medal record
Women's volleyball
Representing the United States
Pan American Games
Silver medal – second place	1963 São Paulo	Team
Gold medal – first place	1967 Winnipeg	Team

Linda Kathleen Murphy (born September 3, 1943) is an American former volleyball player. She played for the United States national team at the 1963 Pan American Games, the 1964 Summer Olympics, and the 1967 Pan American Games. She was born in Glendale, California.
