= Emanuel Newdon =

Brazilian volleyball player

Personal information
- Full name: Emanuel de Victor Newdon
- Born: 25 December 1937 (age 88); Recife, Brazil
- Height: 1.92 m (6 ft 4 in)

Volleyball information
- Number: 4

National team
1962–1964	Brazil
Honours
Men's volleyball
Representing Brazil
Pan American Games
Gold medal – first place	1963 São Paulo	Team

Emanuel de Victor Newdon (born 25 December 1937) is a Brazilian former volleyball player who competed in the 1964 Summer Olympics in Tokyo.
