= Pedro Velasco =

American volleyball player (1937–2023)

Personal information
- Full name: Pedro Velasco, Jr.
- Nickname: Pete
- Born: April 6, 1937; Honolulu, Hawaii
- Died: March 21, 2023 (aged 85); Pāhoa, Hawaii
- Height: 178 cm (5 ft 10 in)
- Education: Church College

Volleyball information
- Position: Setter
- Number: 2 (national team)

National team
1963–1968	United States
Honours
Men's volleyball
Representing the United States
Pan American Games
Gold medal – first place	1967 Winnipeg	Team
Silver medal – second place	1963 São Paulo	Team

Pedro "Pete" Velasco Jr. (April 6, 1937 – March 21, 2023) was an American volleyball player who competed with the United States national volleyball team as captain in the 1964 Summer Olympics in Tokyo, and also competed with the national team in the 1968 Summer Olympics in Mexico City. He won a silver medal at the 1963 Pan American Games and a gold medal at the 1967 Pan American Games. He was a setter.

Velasco was inducted into the International Volleyball Hall of Fame in 1997.

== Personal life and death ==
Velasco was born in Honolulu, Hawaii, on April 6, 1937. He died at his home in Pāhoa, Hawaii on March 21, 2023, at the age of 85.
