= Kathy Gregory =

American retired volleyball coach (born 1945)

Kathy Gregory (born 1945) is an American retired volleyball coach. Upon her retirement as the University of California, Santa Barbara's only women's volleyball head coach, after 38 seasons she amassed 882 wins, the fifth most in NCAA Division I history. As a player, Gregory represented the United States at the 1970 World Games and the 1971 Pan American Games and she was also the captain of the professional San Diego Breakers. In 1989, Gregory was inducted into the Volleyball Hall of Fame.

== Early life ==
Gregory was born and raised in California, alongside two older brothers. Her brother Bill coached her in beach volleyball and encouraged her to enter a mixed open tournament at the age of 14 in 1959. Gregory continued to compete in indoor volleyball while attending Immaculate Heart High School in Los Angeles and California State University, Los Angeles (Cal State LA).

== Career ==
=== Professional ===
From 1968 to 1984, Gregory primarily played volleyball in recreational matches. Gregory competed with the San Diego Breakers while working as a physical education and sociology teacher at Marymount High School in Westwood. During the 1975–76 season, she was named captain of the Breakers and was later traded to Santa Barbara for Ken Peterson. Beyond competing with the Breakers, Gregory won top honors as Women's Beach Tournament Player of the Year in 1976, 1977, 1978, 1981, and 1983, earning the nickname "Queen of the Beach." She also was named Player of the Year in 1974 and 1979 and earned two gold medals at USA Volleyball Nationals and represented the United States at the 1970 World Games and the 1971 Pan American Games.

As part of the Association of Volleyball Professionals, Gregory primarily played with Janice Harrer from 1984 to 1986. From 1987 to 1990, she played for the Women's Professional Volleyball Association. For her playing career, Gregory was named into the Volleyball Hall of Fame in 1989. From USA Volleyball, Gregory was selected as an All-Time Great Women's Player in 1984. For beach volleyball, Gregory was selected by USA Volleyball as a Women's Beach All-Era Player in 2004 and an All-Time Great Female Beach Volleyball Player in 2015.

=== Coaching ===
In 1974, Gregory began coaching women's volleyball at the University of California, Santa Barbara, three years after the passage of Title IX. As women's sports were still underfunded, her team played in a "110 degrees" gym, she had to set up her own nets, and she nearly quit after also being unable to acquire assistant coaches or scholarships for student-athletes. In spite of this, she led the team to numerous NCAA appearances, including the Elite 8 and Sweet 16. Gregory was presented with the 1981 ‘Salute to Women’ award for her dedication to women's sports growth and was selected for the USVBA ‘All-Time Great Player’ award. In 1996, Gregory broke two volleyball records as a player; she became the senior-most player in the nation to earn her AAA beach rating and earned her 16th USA Volleyball All-American award. During USA Volleyball's Diamond Jubilee celebration, Kathy was named to the All-Era Team for the period of 1949 to 1977.

From 1990 to 2009, Gregory was named co-coach of the year one time and coach of the year six times while in the Big West Conference with Santa Barbara as their women's volleyball coach. In 1993, the American Volleyball Coaches Association selected Gregory as coach of the year for Division I teams. In recognition of her accomplishments, Gregory was named 2010 Women's Sport Coach of the Year and honored as a "Legend of the `Dome" prior to a game against Long Beach State. During the game, she led her team to an upset as they earned their fourth straight win for a 9–6 overall record. At the conclusion of the season, Gregory was also recognized as the year's Professional Women's Association's Unsung Heroines.

Gregory concluded her tenure as UC Santa Barbara's first women's volleyball coach in 2013, ending with 882 wins as the fifth-most in NCAA Division I history. In 2014, USA Volleyball gave Gregory the Donald S. Shondell All-Time Great Coach award. During her retirement, she was inducted into the UC Santa Barbara Intercollegiate Athletics Hall of Fame and Southern California Indoor Volleyball Hall of Fame.
