= Patty Dowdell =

American volleyball player and coach

Patty Dowdell (born 1954 or 1955) was a retired volleyball player who primarily was on the United States women's national volleyball team from 1974 to 1980. With the national team, Dowdell and the United States finished in seventh at the 1977 FIVB Volleyball Women's World Cup and fifth at the 1978 FIVB Volleyball Women's World Championship. After playing at the 1979 Pan American Games, Dowdell was part of the American volleyball team that boycotted the 1980 Summer Olympics. She resumed playing on the national team in the early 1980s and did not play any games at the 1984 Summer Olympics. Outside of the national team, Dowdell played for the Dallas Belles and Chicago Breeze in the Major League Volleyball during the late 1980s.

For her coaching career, Dowdell coached the basketball, softball and volleyball teams for the DePauw Tigers between 1984 and 1989. With DePauw, Dowdell had a combined total of 92 wins and 135 losses in all three sports. After working as an assistant coach for the University of Iowa in the 1990s, Dowdell was the head coach of the Texas Woman's Pioneers volleyball team from 1996 to 2002. With Texas, Dowdell had 91 wins and 154 losses. Dowdell was inducted into both the International Volleyball Hall of Fame and NAIA Hall of Fame in 1994. She was also a torchbearer at the 1996 Summer Olympics.

== Early life and education ==
In the mid-1950s, Dowdell was born in Houston, Texas. Growing up, Dowdell became a volleyball player during high school in 1968. After high school, Dowdell became a varsity volleyball player at Southwest Texas College in 1973. That year, Dowdell appeared at the 1973 Summer Universiade. For her post-secondary education in the 1980s, Patty studied biology in Texas Lutheran College and physical education in DePauw University until 1987.

== Career ==
=== Playing career ===
Between 1974 and 1980, Dowdell played on the United States women's national volleyball team and was promoted to captain in 1976. During this time period, Dowdell and the United States team won the 1979 U.S. Volleyball Association National Championships. At world events, Dowdell captained the American team that was seventh at the 1977 FIVB Volleyball Women's World Cup. The following year, Dowdell was part of the American team that placed fifth at the 1978 FIVB Volleyball Women's World Championship. In international competitions, Dowdell injured her back while competing at the 1979 Pan American Games. At the 1979 Games, the American volleyball team finished in fourth place. Following the Pan American Games, Dowdell had therapy for her injured back and returned to competition in October 1979.

Dowdell was part of the United States volleyball team roster that earned a spot at the 1980 Summer Olympics. She did not compete at the event after the United States boycotted the 1980 Olympics. For the end of the year, Dowdell continued to play on the American team before joining the West Germany volleyball team in October 1980. She remained with the West German team until December 1980. While at Texas Lutheran, Dowdell and her team made it to the final of the 1981 Association for Intercollegiate Athletics for Women Division II Championship in volleyball. She also became an athlete and basketball player while completing her studies at Texas Lutheran in the early 1980s.

In 1983, Dowdell resumed her volleyball tenure with the American women's team and participated at the Women's NORCECA Volleyball Championship. The following year, Dowdell did not play at the 1984 Summer Olympics after being named a member of the American volleyball team to the Olympics. After moving from DePauw to Major League Volleyball in 1987, Dowdell played two years each with the Dallas Belles and Chicago Breeze. During the 1990s, Dowdell was on the winning team at multiple Open Championships held by U.S. Volleyball.

=== Coaching career ===
During the mid to late 1980s, Dowdell was a coach for various sports teams in DePauw University. With the DePauw Tigers, Dowdell had 16 wins and 43 losses as the coach of their women's basketball team from 1984 to 1987. During this time period, Dowdell coached the softball team to 16 wins and 38 losses as DePauw's softball coach from 1985 to 1986. As the women's volleyball coach for the Tigers between 1987 and 1989, Dowdell had 60 wins and 54 losses.

In 1990, Dowdell left DePauw to become an assistant coach in volleyball for the University of Iowa. She remained in Iowa until she was hired by Texas Woman's University as a head coach in late 1995. From 1996 to 2002, Dowdell coached the Texas Woman's Pioneers volleyball team. With the Pioneers, had 91 wins and 154 losses.

== Awards and honors ==
During her playing career, Dowdell was the 1973 Rookie of the Year for the United States Volleyball Association. As a Most Valuable Player, Dowdell was given this honor at the 1978 National Championships and the 1994 Open Championships. In 1989, Dowdell was named an All Time Great Player by USA Volleyball. For the 1996 Summer Olympics, Dowdell was one of the torchbearers in Houston. For hall of fames, Dowdell became a member of the Texas Lutheran College Athletic Hall of Fame in 1994. That year, she was also inducted into the International Volleyball Hall of Fame and NAIA Hall of Fame. As part of the 1980 Olympic team, Dowdell was inducted into the Colorado Springs Sports Hall of Fame in 2010.
