= Tom Haine =

American volleyball player (1933–1994)

Medal record

Men's volleyball

Representing the United States

Pan American Games
Gold medal – first place	1967 Winnipeg	Team

Thomas Allen Haine (January 6, 1933 – September 10, 1994) was an American volleyball player who competed in the 1968 Summer Olympics. He was born in Minot, North Dakota and died in Honolulu, Hawaii. In 1991, Haine was inducted into the Volleyball Hall of Fame.
