= Nikolay Karpol =

Russian women's volleyball coach (born 1938)

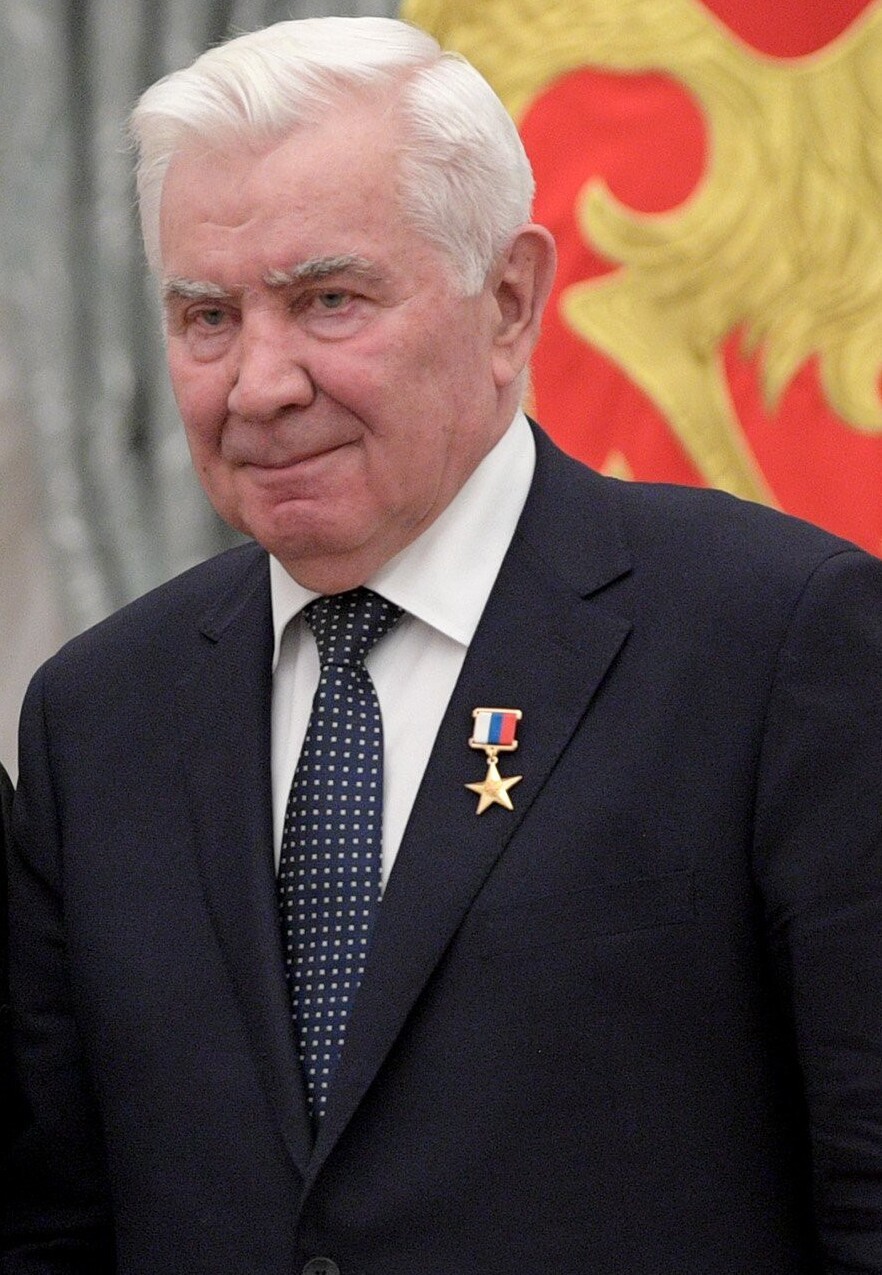
- Nikolay Karpol at the Kremlin in 2018

Personal information
- Full name: Nikolay Vasilyevich Karpol
- Nickname: The Howling Bear
- Born: 1 May 1938 (age 88); Bereznica, Polesie Voivodeship, Second Polish Republic

Coaching information
Previous teams coached
Years	Teams
1969–present	VC Uralochka-NTMK Yekaterinburg

Nikolay Vasiliyevich Karpol (Russian: Николай Васильевич Карполь; born 1 May 1938) is a Russian women's volleyball coach and a longstanding coach of the Soviet national team (then the Commonwealth of Independent States team of 1992 following the collapse of the USSR) and later the Russia women's national volleyball team. Known as The Howling Bear, Karpol was a regular at the Olympic Games, with his teams usually earning a last call on the Olympic podium, winning gold medals in 1980 and 1988 and taking the silver medals in 1992, 2000, and 2004, for a total of five Olympic medals. In 2020, he set a new world record by coaching Uralochka for 51 years.

Karpol coached the Soviet women to the gold medal at the 1990 Goodwill Games in Seattle and the Russian women to the gold medal at the 1994 Goodwill Games in Saint Petersburg.

In 2009, Karpol was inducted into the International Volleyball Hall of Fame.

== Coaching and Administrative Awards ==
=== Summer Olympic Games ===
- 1980 Moscow – Gold medal (with (Soviet Union) URS)
- 1988 Seoul – Gold medal (with (Soviet Union) URS)
- 1992 Barcelona – Silver medal (with EUN)
- 2000 Sydney – Silver medal (with (Russia) RUS)
- 2004 Athens – Silver medal (with (Russia) RUS)

=== FIVB World Championships ===
- 1990 – Gold medal (with (Soviet Union) URS)
- 1994 – (with (Russia) RUS)
- 1998 – (with (Russia) RUS)
- 2002 – (with (Russia) RUS)

=== European Championships ===
- 1977 - Gold medal (with (Soviet Union) URS)
- 1979 - Gold medal (with (Soviet Union) URS)
- 1981 - Silver medal (with (Soviet Union) URS)
- 1983 - Silver medal (with (Soviet Union) URS)
- 1985 - Gold medal (with (Soviet Union) URS)
- 1987 - Silver medal (with (Soviet Union) URS)
- 1989 - Gold medal (with (Soviet Union) URS)
- 1991 - Gold medal (with (Soviet Union) URS)
- 1993 - Gold medal (with (Russia) RUS)
- 1995 - Bronze medal (with (Russia) RUS)
- 1997 - Gold medal (with (Russia) RUS)
- 1999 - Gold medal (with (Russia) RUS)
- 2001 - Gold medal (with (Russia) RUS)
- 2005 - Bronze medal (with (Russia) RUS)
- 2007 - Bronze medal (with (Russia) RUS)

=== World Grand Champions Cup ===
- 1993 – Third Place (with (Russia) RUS)
- 1997 – Champion (with (Russia) RUS)
- 2001 – Runner-Up (with (Russia) RUS)

=== Grand-prix ===
- 1993 - Bronze medal (with (Russia) RUS)
- 1996 - Bronze medal (with (Russia) RUS)
- 1997 - Gold medal (with (Russia) RUS)
- 1998 - Silver medal (with (Russia) RUS)
- 1999 - Gold medal (with (Russia) RUS)
- 2000 - Silver medal (with (Russia) RUS)
- 2002 - Gold medal (with (Russia) RUS)
- 2001 - Bronze medal (with (Russia) RUS)
- 2003 - Silver medal (with (Russia) RUS)

=== CEV Champions League ===
- 1981 - Champion (with (Russian Soviet Federative Socialist Republic) Uralochka Sverdlovsk)
- 1982 - Champion (with (Russian Soviet Federative Socialist Republic) Uralochka Sverdlovsk)
- 1983 - Champion (with (Russian Soviet Federative Socialist Republic) Uralochka Sverdlovsk)
- 1987 - Champion (with (Russian Soviet Federative Socialist Republic) Uralochka Sverdlovsk)
- 1988 - Runner-Up (with (Russian Soviet Federative Socialist Republic) Uralochka Sverdlovsk)
- 1989 - Champion (with (Russian Soviet Federative Socialist Republic) Uralochka Sverdlovsk)
- 1990 - Champion (with (Russian Soviet Federative Socialist Republic) Uralochka Sverdlovsk)
- 1991 - Runner-Up (with (Russian Soviet Federative Socialist Republic) Uralochka Sverdlovsk)
- 1992 - Third Place (with (Russia) Uralochka Yekaterinburg)
- 1993 - Third Place (with (Russia) Uralochka Yekaterinburg)
- 1994 - Champion (with (Russia) Uralochka Yekaterinburg)
- 1995 - Champion (with (Russia) Uralochka Yekaterinburg)
- 1996 - Runner-Up (with (Russia) Uralochka Yekaterinburg)
- 1997 - Runner-Up (with (Russia) Uralochka Yekaterinburg)
- 2000 - Runner-Up (with (Russia) Uralochka Yekaterinburg)
- 2001 - Third Place (with (Russia) Uralochka Yekaterinburg)
- 2003 - Runner-Up (with (Russia) Uralochka Yekaterinburg)

Croatian journalist and publicist Tomislav Birtic published a book "Karpol: Lunatics - That's What I Need".

== Honours and awards ==
- Order of Merit for the Fatherland, 3rd class
- Honoured Worker of Physical Culture, Russia
- Order of Friendship
- Order of the Red Banner of Labour
- Order of Friendship of Peoples
- Honorary Citizen of the Sverdlovsk Oblast
