= Nancy Owen =

American volleyball player (born 1943)

Personal information
- Full name: Nancy Lee Owen
- Born: May 2, 1943 (age 83); Cleveland, Ohio, U.S.
- Height: 174 cm (5 ft 9 in)
Medal record
Women's volleyball
Representing the United States
Pan American Games
Gold medal – first place	1967 Winnipeg	Team
Silver medal – second place	1963 São Paulo	Team

Nancy Lee Owen (born May 2, 1943) is an American former volleyball player. She played for the United States national team at the 1963 Pan American Games, the 1964 Summer Olympics, the 1967 Pan American Games, and the 1968 Summer Olympics. She was born in Cleveland, Ohio and first became interested in volleyball after her physical education teacher introduced her to the sport.

== Personal life ==
Owen grew up in southern California, where she received training in volleyball. Her training was the main driving force behind the move and her family was supportive of her training.

After retiring Owen began working as a national speaker and representative for the sport of volleyball. Owen currently lives in Nampa, Idaho with her husband.

== College coaching career ==
After competing in the Olympics Owen began working as a coach for the California State University volleyball team. During her time as coach she led the team to several wins and in 1986 led the team to win the West Coast Conference Championship. The team also earned the first NCAA tournament in West Coast Conference history in 1986 and during that same year Owen was named the WCC Coach of the Year.
