= Jane Ward (volleyball) =

American volleyball player (1928–2024)

Personal information
- Full name: Jane Lois Ward
- Born: April 30, 1928; Buffalo, New York, U.S.
- Died: November 24, 2024 (aged 96); Carlsbad, California, U.S.
- Height: 170 cm (5 ft 7 in)
Medal record
Women's volleyball
Representing the United States
Pan American Games
Gold medal – first place	1967 Winnipeg	Team
Silver medal – second place	1959 Chicago	Team
Silver medal – second place	1963 São Paulo	Team

Jane Lois Ward (April 30, 1928 – November 24, 2024) was an American volleyball player and coach. She played for the United States national team at the 1955 Pan American Games, the 1956 FIVB Women's Volleyball World Championship, the 1959 Pan American Games, the 1960 FIVB Women's Volleyball World Championship, the 1963 Pan American Games, the 1964 Summer Olympics, the 1967 Pan American Games, and the 1968 Summer Olympics.

== Early life and education ==
Ward was born in Buffalo, New York on April 30, 1928. She attended the University of Buffalo, where she majored in physical education, played hockey, and was a star player on semi-pro softball and basketball teams.

== Playing career ==
In the early 1950s, Ward moved to Southern California, where beginning in 1954, she played as an outside hitter and setter in the United States Volleyball Association (USVBA), primarily for the Long Beach Ahern Shamrocks. She was a dominant player in the league until her retirement in 1968; her teams won 13 national championships, she was All-American each year, and she was USVBA MVP five times.

Internationally, Ward played on the United States women's volleyball team at the World Championships in 1956 (the US's first appearance, winning silver) and 1960; at the 1955 Pan American Games (winning silver), the 1959 Pan American Games (winning silver), the 1963 Pan American Games (winning silver), and the 1967 Pan American Games (winning gold); and at the 1964 Summer Olympics (the inaugural year for the sport) and the 1968 Summer Olympics.

== Coaching career ==
After retiring as a player in 1968, Ward coached women's volleyball for 20 years. In 1968, she joined the coaching staff at Cabrillo College in Aptos, California. She was head coach from 1969 to 1978; her team won the California state title in 1978. From 1974 to 1979, she was also the first women's volleyball head coach at San Jose State University, where the team placed 7th nationally in 1978 and she was conference coach of the year in 1974.

== Death ==
Ward died in Carlsbad, California, on November 24, 2024, at the age of 96.

== Honors ==
- USVBA All-Time Great Players Award, 1969
- International Volleyball Hall of Fame, 1988
- USA Volleyball National Team Award, 2009
- University of Buffalo Athletic Hall of Fame, 1989
- Cabrillo College Hall of Fame, 2019

== Publications ==
- with Allen E. Scates. Volleyball. Allyn and Bacon series in basic concepts of physical activity. [1969]. 2nd ed. Boston: Allyn and Bacon, 1975. ISBN 9780205048175.
