= João Cláudio França =

Brazilian volleyball player (born 1943)

João França

Personal information
- Full name: João Cláudio França
- Born: 1 January 1943 (age 83); Belo Horizonte, Brazil
- Height: 1.85 m (6 ft 1 in)

Volleyball information
- Number: 1

National team
1963–1964	Brazil
Honours
Men's volleyball
Representing Brazil
Pan American Games
Gold medal – first place	1963 São Paulo	Team

João Cláudio França (born 1 January 1943) is a Brazilian former volleyball player who competed in the 1964 Summer Olympics in Tokyo.
