= Online college fair =

Event for prospective college students

An online college fair, or virtual college fair, is an online event hosted by colleges in the US, where colleges jointly provide information to prospective students. An online college fair operates according to several of the usual conventions of a “brick and mortar” college recruitment fair: there are event halls, schools have booths that prospective students or parents can visit to exchange information, and there are speaker sessions by various admissions and education experts. The entire fair is contained online, and therefore an online college fair can also have many of the characteristics of a virtual world.

== History ==
The first such online college fair was organized by the National Association for College Admission Counseling (NACAC) and held on October 9, 2001. Approximately 200 institutions participated; the number of participating students is unknown. This first online college fair was widely considered a failure, as the number of students trying to log on overloaded the system. NACAC, which planned to conduct online college fairs regularly, discontinued the program after the initial event.

Gradschools.com hosted an online college fair in conjunction with a live fair. This event also ran into technical difficulties; namely firewall problems and recruiters that were not prepared to use the online chat features. In November 2002, the Big Apple College Fair also had an online college fair in conjunction with a live fair.

In October 2007, BusinessWeek, which produces annual rankings of United States business school Master of Business Administration (MBA) programs, held MBA Expo 2007 for prospective students with the tagline “Find the B-School that fits you best.” CollegeWeekLive entered the market on November 13, 2007. CollegeWeekLive grew 67% in 2012.

On March 23 and 24, 2011, CollegeWeekLive conducted the largest online college fair up until that date, with over 60,000 event attendees. Univision Media, in collaboration with CollegeWeekLive, held a virtual college fair in 2012, with several presentations in Spanish. CappexConnect launched in 2013. Part of the Cappex group of websites, CappexConnect hosts online college fairs and online open houses. On September 10, 2013, and October 9, 2013, CappexConnect hosted a fall fair series that included over 15,000 student attendees visiting online booths from over 90 colleges and universities.
