= Michael O'Hara (volleyball) =

American volleyball player (1932–2018)

Medal record

Men's volleyball

Representing the United States

Pan American Games
Gold medal – first place	1959 Chicago	Team
Silver medal – second place	1963 São Paulo	Team

Michael Futch O'Hara (September 15, 1932 – February 1, 2018) was an American volleyball player who competed in the 1964 Summer Olympics. He was born in Waco, Texas.
