= Barry Brown (volleyball) =

American volleyball player (1934–2022)

Medal record

Men's volleyball

Representing the United States

Pan American Games
Silver medal – second place	1963 São Paulo	Team

Barry Ross Brown (October 10, 1934 – December 20, 2022) was an American volleyball player who competed in the 1964 Summer Olympics.

Brown died on December 20, 2022, in Reno, Nevada.
