= Mary Perry =

American volleyball player

Personal information
- Full name: Mary Margaret Perry
- Born: January 3, 1943; Burbank, California, U.S.
- Died: June 3, 2012 (aged 69); Medford, Oregon, U.S.
- Height: 173 cm (5 ft 8 in)
Medal record
Women's volleyball
Representing the United States
Pan American Games
Silver medal – second place	1963 São Paulo	Team
Gold medal – first place	1967 Winnipeg	Team

Mary Margaret Perry (January 3, 1943 – June 3, 2012) was an American volleyball player. She competed at the 1964 and the 1968 Summer Olympics. She died at home of the rare disease, multiple system atrophy.

== Early life ==
Perry was born in Burbank, California, in 1943. Her passion for volleyball began when she enrolled in Pierce Junior College and grew after she formed the South California volleyball team, the Renegades.

== Olympics ==
In 1963, Perry was chosen for the US Women's Volleyball Team to compete at the Pan American Games in São Paulo, Brazil. The team won the gold medal. At the top of her sport throughout the 1960s, she went on to participate in two Olympiads in 1964 in Tokyo and the 1968 Olympics in Mexico City.

== Life after the Olympics ==
After graduating from Cal State Northridge with a bachelor's degree in physical education in 1971, Perry taught and coached in Honolulu and at Cal State Hayward, where she earned her master's degrees in P.E. and Education.

Perry moved to Ashland, Oregon in 1986 and assisted coaching women's volleyball at Southern Oregon State College (now Southern Oregon University). She received her third master's degree in psychology from S.O.S.C. and coached senior citizens in fitness through Elderhostel. She produced the acclaimed fitness video, "Early Morning Stretch" and worked with geriatric patients through Jackson County Mental Health until her retirement in 2002.

== Awards ==
In 1984, Perry was inducted into the Cal State Northridge Athletics Hall of Fame. In 2009, she was awarded the Flo Hyman All-Time Great Player Award and was inducted into the U.S. Volleyball Hall of Fame.

== Death ==
Perry died at home of the rare disease, multiple system atrophy. At first she was diagnosed as having Parkinson's disease but that was later defined as Multiple System Atrophy, a.k.a. Parkinson plus syndrome.
