= Josias Ramalho =

Brazilian volleyball player (1937–1988)

Personal information
- Full name: Josias de Oliveira Ramalho
- Born: 29 August 1937; Juiz de Fora, Minas Gerais, Brazil
- Died: 1988 (aged 50–51)
- Height: 1.82 m (6 ft 0 in)

Volleyball information
- Number: 8

National team
1956–1964	Brazil
Medal record
Men's volleyball
Representing Brazil
Pan American Games
Gold medal – first place	1963 São Paulo	Team

Josias de Oliveira Ramalho (29 August 1937 – 1988) was a Brazilian former volleyball player who competed in the 1964 Summer Olympics in Tokyo.
