= William G. Morgan =

Inventor of the volleyball (1870–1942)

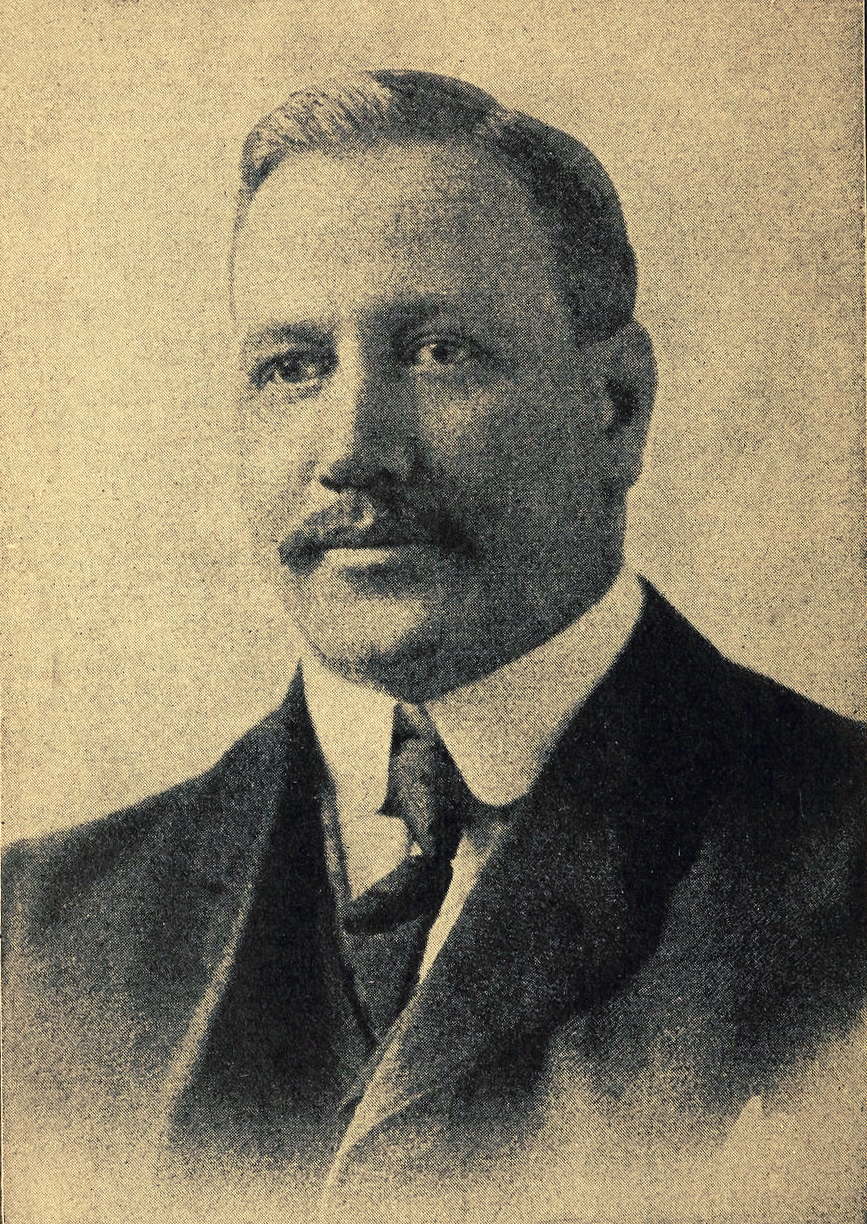
- Born: William George Morgan; January 23, 1870; Lockport, New York, U.S.
- Died: December 27, 1942 (aged 72); Lockport, New York, U.S.
- Education: Springfield College
- Occupation: Educator
- Known for: Inventor of volleyball
- Spouse: Mary King Caldwell (divorced)

William George Morgan (January 23, 1870 – December 27, 1942) was an American sports educator and the inventor of volleyball, originally called "Mintonette", a name derived from the game of badminton which he later agreed to change to better reflect the nature of the sport. He was born in Lockport, New York, U.S.

He met James Naismith, inventor of basketball, while Morgan was studying at Springfield College in 1892. Like Naismith, Morgan pursued a career in Physical Education at the YMCA. Influenced by Naismith and basketball, in 1895, in Holyoke, Massachusetts, Morgan invented "Mintonette" a less vigorous team sport more suitable for older members of the YMCA but one that still required athletic skill. Later Alfred S. Halstead watched it being played and renamed it "Volleyball".

In 1985, he was inducted into the Volleyball Hall of Fame as the inaugural member.

== Early life ==
William George Morgan graduated from high school at Northfield Mount Hermon School and moved on to attend the YMCA International Training School (Later renamed Springfield College) in Massachusetts with James Naismith, the inventor of basketball. Both Morgan and Naismith pursued careers in Physical Education at the YMCA (Young Men’s Christian Association). Auburn, Maine, at the YMCA, was where Morgan spent one year working prior to graduating from Springfield College. During the summer of 1895, Morgan moved to Holyoke, Massachusetts, where he continued to work for the YMCA, becoming the Director of Physical Education. With Morgan being the Director, it allowed him to devise workout plans and teach sports in depth to the young male adults.

== Creating the sport ==
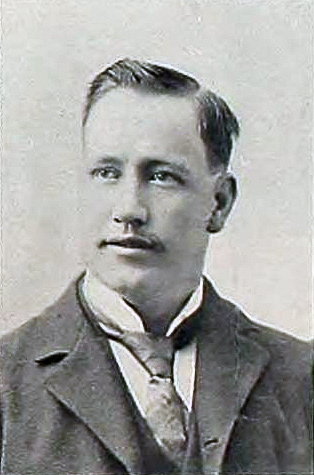
Portrait of William G. Morgan as Director of Physical Education

As he worked as the Director of Physical Education at the YMCA in Holyoke, he noticed the game of basketball was not meant for everyone to play. The weaker young men, non-athletic adults, and the older adults were unable to keep up with running up and down the court, along with the amount of contact they would occasionally run into. Morgan then had to think of a game in which everyone would have an equal amount of participation but also had similar objectives to basketball. He wanted to create a game which everyone could play, no matter their age or physical ability.

Between trying to run classes at the YMCA and creating a new sport suitable for all, Morgan decided it was best that he use ideas from various sports such as handball, tennis, and badminton, and his own knowledge from sports training methods and experience, to create this new sport. He decided that the game would involve a six-foot, six-inch net in the middle dividing the 2 separate playing areas, and that it would be played on a 30 ft. × 60 ft. court, so that it could be played in gyms anywhere across the nation.

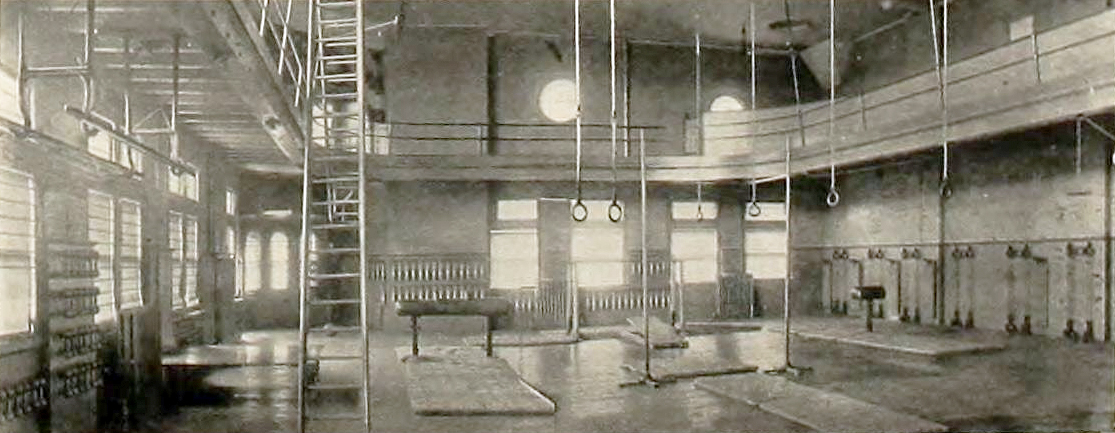
The YMCA gymnasium where Morgan developed volleyball, in Holyoke

After creating some ground rules, William Morgan had to experiment with his game. First, he had to decide which ball to use. A basketball was too heavy while the basketball bladder was too light. After testing all of the balls he had available, he had come to the conclusion that his best option was to ask A.G. Spalding & Bros. to make him a ball. A young A.G. Spalding & Bros. equipment designer and master marine cloth tailor, Dale Callaghan, developed and produced the first prototype volleyball. Morgan was very pleased with Spalding & Bros. work. They created Morgan the perfect ball for his sport, which was covered in leather, with the circumference of 25–27 inches. The ball was also the perfect weight for Morgan's sport. The ball weighed 9–12 ounces. This new ball that had been made for Morgan's sport was the perfect finishing touch to the basics of the sport. The last thing that had to be done by Morgan was to create a name. Morgan came up with "Mintonette" as the new name for his game. The game was called "Mintonette" at first because it was similar to badminton.

== Introducing the sport ==
The first time Morgan revealed his sport to the other Directors of Physical was at the YMCA located in Springfield, in 1896. He presented his new, creative idea to Dr. Luther Halsey Gulick (director of the professional physical education training school) and the rest of the YMCA Directors of Physical Education. Dr. Gulick was so impressed that he asked Morgan to present his sport at the school's new stadium.

In preparation for his big debut, Morgan created 2 teams of 5 men, who would help in demonstrating “Mintonette” in front of the conference delegates in the East Gymnasium at Springfield College.

In December of 1895, William Morgan presented his new sport to the world. When Morgan was explaining the game before the demonstration, he named a few key guidelines in the game of "Mintonette" such as that the game was created so that it could be played in open air and in gyms as well as the objective of the game was to keep the ball in action as it goes from one side of the high net, to the other.

One of the conference delegates, Professor Alfred T. Halsted, loved the game of Mintonette, but he felt like something was just not right. Professor Halsted suggested that the name of the game should be Volleyball, since the main point of the game was to “volley” the ball to a player or over the net. Morgan agreed with Halsted's idea and since then the original game of "Mintonette" has been referred to as Volleyball.

Morgan continued to tweak the rules of the game until July 1896, where his sport was added into the first official handbook of the North American YMCA Athletic League.

== Aftermath ==
On July 7, 1896, the first game of volleyball was played at Springfield College.

- In 1900, Spalding started to produce a special ball, which was designed specifically for the sport – A volleyball.
- In 1920, new rules were instigated which included the three hits per side and the back row attack rules.
- In 1964, at the Summer Olympic Games in Tokyo, Volleyball was introduced to the Olympics.

== Later life ==
William Morgan left his job at the YMCA in 1897 to start a new career with General Electric and Westinghouse. He stayed in touch with Springfield College and stated that he was "content in the knowledge that the game brought a richer life to millions of people throughout the world."

Morgan died on December 27, 1942, in Lockport, New York where he was born.

== Credits ==
In 1995, The Morgan Trophy Award was created. The Award is presented annually to the most outstanding male and female collegiate volleyball player in the US. An elementary school in Holyoke, William Morgan School, bears his name.
