= Craig Buck =

American volleyball player (born 1958)

Personal information
- Born: Craig Werner Buck; August 24, 1958 (age 68); Los Angeles, California, U.S.
- Height: 6 ft 9 in (206 cm)
- Education: Pepperdine University

Volleyball information
- Position: Middle blocker
- Number: 7

National team
1981–1990	United States
Medal record
Men's volleyball
Representing the United States
Olympic Games
Gold medal – first place	1984 Los Angeles	Team
Gold medal – first place	1988 Seoul	Team
World Championship
Gold medal – first place	1986 France	Team
FIVB World Cup
Gold medal – first place	1985 Japan
Pan American Games
Gold medal – first place	1987 Indianapolis	Team

Craig Werner Buck (born August 24, 1958) is an American former volleyball player and two-time Olympic gold medalist. He was a member of the United States national team that won the gold medal at the 1984 Summer Olympics in Los Angeles and the 1988 Summer Olympics in Seoul.

Buck also helped the United States to gold medals at the 1985 FIVB World Cup and the 1986 FIVB World Championship, which, following the 1984 Olympic gold, constituted a "triple crown".

Buck is widely regarded as one of the best middle blockers of all time. He was also a very effective hitter. In 1990, the United States Olympic Committee selected him as their volleyball player of the year.

Buck was inducted into the International Volleyball Hall of Fame in 1998.

== High school ==
Buck played volleyball at William Howard Taft Charter High School in Woodland Hills, Los Angeles, where he was selected as an All-City player in 1975 and 1976.

== College ==
Buck was an All-American at Pepperdine University in 1980 and 1981 while playing under coach Marv Dunphy.

In 1985, Buck was inducted into the Pepperdine Hall of Fame.

== Awards ==
- Two-time All-American — 1980, 1981
- Two-time Olympic gold medal — 1984, 1988
- FIVB World Cup gold medal — 1985
- FIVB World Championship gold medal — 1986
- Pepperdine Hall of Fame — 1985
- Pan American Games gold medal — 1987
- USOC volleyball player of the year — 1990
- International Volleyball Hall of Fame — 1998

== See also ==
- USA Volleyball
