= Stanisław Gościniak =

Polish volleyball player and coach

Personal information
- Full name: Stanisław Kazimierz Gościniak
- Born: 18 July 1944 (age 82); Poznań, Poland

Coaching information
Previous teams coached
Years	Teams
1977–1992; 1986–1987; 1993–1998; 2000–2001; 2002–2003; 2003–2004	AZS Częstochowa; Poland; AZS Częstochowa; AZS Częstochowa; AZS Częstochowa; Poland

Volleyball information
- Position: Setter

Career
Years	Teams
1964–1968; 1968–1975	Gwardia Wrocław; Resovia

National team
1965–1974	Poland (218)
Honours
Men's volleyball
Representing Poland
FIVB World Championship
Gold medal – first place	1974 Mexico
CEV European Championship
Bronze medal – third place	1967 Turkey

Stanisław Kazimierz Gościniak (born 18 July 1944) is a Polish former volleyball player and coach, a member of the Poland national team from 1965 to 1974, and the 1974 World Champion. He was a participant in the 1968 and 1972 Summer Olympics. Gościniak was inducted into the Volleyball Hall of Fame in 2005.

== Honours ==
=== As a player ===
- CEV European Champions Cup
  - 1972–73 – with Resovia
- Domestic
  - 1970–71 Polish Championship, with Resovia
  - 1971–72 Polish Championship, with Resovia
  - 1973–74 Polish Championship, with Resovia
  - 1974–75 Polish Cup, with Resovia
  - 1974–75 Polish Championship, with Resovia

=== As a coach ===
- Domestic
  - 1989–90 Polish Championship, with AZS Częstochowa
  - 1993–94 Polish Championship, with AZS Częstochowa
  - 1994–95 Polish Championship, with AZS Częstochowa
  - 1995–96 Polish SuperCup, with AZS Częstochowa
  - 1996–97 Polish Championship, with AZS Częstochowa
  - 1997–98 Polish Cup, with AZS Częstochowa

=== Individual awards ===
- 1974: FIVB World Championship – Most valuable player

=== State awards ===
- 1995: Gold Cross of Merit
- 2012: Officer's Cross of Polonia Restituta

Sporting positions
Preceded by (Poland) Hubert Wagner	Head coach of Poland; 1986–1987	Succeeded by (Poland) Leszek Milewski
Preceded by (Poland) Waldemar Wspaniały	Head coach of Poland; 2003–2004	Succeeded by (Argentina) Raúl Lozano
