= Ron Lang =

American volleyball player

Ron Lang (born 5 February 1937) is an American former volleyball player who competed in the 1964 Summer Olympics.
