= Larry Rundle =

American volleyball player (born 1944)

Medal record

Men's volleyball

Representing the United States

Pan American Games
Gold medal – first place	1967 Winnipeg	Team

Lawrence Dean "Larry" Rundle (born November 18, 1944) is an American former volleyball player who competed in the 1968 Summer Olympics. He was born in Detroit, Michigan.
