= Dusty Dvorak =

American volleyball player (born 1958)

Personal information
- Nickname: Dusty
- Born: Douglas Scott Dvorak; July 29, 1958 (age 68); San Diego, California, U.S.
- Height: 188 cm (6 ft 2 in)
- Education: University of Southern California

Volleyball information
- Position: Setter
- Number: 1

National team
1981–1986	United States
Medal record
Men's volleyball
Representing the United States
Olympic Games
Gold medal – first place	1984 Los Angeles	Indoor
World Championship
Gold medal – first place	1986 France	Indoor
FIVB World Cup
Gold medal – first place	1985 Japan
Goodwill Games
Silver medal – second place	1986 Moscow

Douglas Scott "Dusty" Dvorak (born July 29, 1958) is an American former volleyball player. He was a member of the United States national volleyball team that won the gold medal at the 1984 Summer Olympics in Los Angeles. He is regarded as one of the greatest setters of all time.

Dvorak helped the United States national team win the gold medal at the 1985 FIVB World Cup in Japan, where he was selected as the best setter. He also helped the United States to the gold medal at the 1986 FIVB World Championship in France. Along with the 1984 Olympic gold, this set of victories earned his team the "triple crown".

Dvorak was inducted into the International Volleyball Hall of Fame in 1998.

== High school ==
Dvorak played volleyball at Laguna Beach High School, where he was named the Southern Section player of the year in 1976.

== College ==
Dvorak played volleyball at the University of Southern California (USC), helping the Trojans win NCAA Championships in 1977 and 1980. In 1980, he was selected as the Most Outstanding Player of the NCAA Championship tournament. He was an All-American all four years at USC.

== Beach volleyball ==
Between 1978 and 1988, Dvorak would occasionally play professional beach volleyball, and once partnered with legendary beach volleyball player Sinjin Smith.

== Awards ==
- Four-time All-American
- Two-time NCAA Champion — 1977, 1980
- NCAA Championship Most Outstanding Player — 1980
- Olympic gold medal — 1984
- FIVB World Cup gold medal — 1985
- FIVB World Cup best setter — 1985
- Goodwill Games silver medal — 1986
- FIVB World Championship gold medal — 1986
- International Volleyball Hall of Fame — 1998
