= Mike Bright (volleyball) =

American volleyball player (1937–2017)

Medal record

Men's volleyball

Representing the United States

Pan American Games
Silver medal – second place	1963 São Paulo	Team

David Michael Bright (November 3, 1937 – September 22, 2017) was an American volleyball player who competed in the 1964 Summer Olympics and the 1968 Summer Olympics. He was born in Grants Pass, Oregon.
