= George J. Fisher =

American physician

George John Fisher
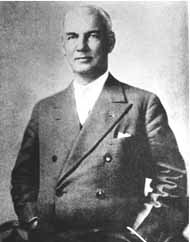
- Born: 2 April 1871; Cincinnati, Ohio
- Died: 1960 (aged 88–89); New York, New York
- Known for: Volleyball, Boy Scouting

- Awards and honors
- 1926, Silver Buffalo Award
- 1946, Leader in Volleyball Award; United States Volleyball Association
- 1951, Morgan Plaque, Springfield College; United States Volleyball Association
- Alpha Phi Omega honorary brother
- 1991, Inducted into the Volleyball Hall of Fame

George J. Fisher (2 April 1871 – 1960) was a physician and leader in the fields of youth development and physical fitness in the United States during the early twentieth century. He was a noted advocate for advancing the sport of volleyball. He conducted early experiments on the effects of smoking which found that it increases blood pressure and heart rate.

== Volleyball and the YMCA ==
Fisher was president of the international YMCA's Physical Directors Society from 1904 to 1919. Fisher is best remembered for making volleyball a part of the program in military training camps, both in the United States and abroad while serving as Secretary of the YMCA War Work Office

With the beginning of World War I, volleyball spread worldwide. Fisher included volleyball in the recreation and education program for American armed forces as early as 1914 and American soldiers fighting in World War I played volleyball on the beaches of Normandy and Brittany. In 1919 Fisher made volleyball a part of the program in military training camps, both in the United States and abroad. He was the editor of the Volleyball Rules Guide for the Army and Navy.

== Boy Scouts of America ==
Fisher served as deputy Chief Scout Executive of the Boy Scouts of America from 1919 to 1943, and as National Commissioner from 1943 until his death in 1960.

== United States Volleyball Association ==
Fisher was the founder and first president (1928–1952) of the United States Volleyball Association. He also served as the first editor of the Volleyball Guide from 1917 to 1947. The Leader in Volleyball Award was renamed to the George J. Fisher Leader in Volleyball Award in his honor.

== Selected publications ==
- The Physical Effects of Smoking. New York: Association Press. 1917.
