= Flo Hyman =

American volleyball player (1954–1986)

Flora Hyman

Personal information
- Full name: Flora Jean Hyman
- Nickname: Flora "Flo" Hyman
- Born: July 31, 1954; Los Angeles, California, U.S.
- Died: January 24, 1986 (aged 31); Matsue, Japan
- Height: 6 ft 5 in (196 cm)
- Education: University of Houston

Volleyball information
- Position: Outside hitter
- Number: 7 for the national team; 31 for Houston

National team
1974–1985	United States
Medal record
Women's volleyball
Representing the United States
Olympic Games
Silver medal – second place	1984 Los Angeles	Team
World Championship
Bronze medal – third place	1982 Peru	Team
Pan American Games
Silver medal – second place	1983 Caracas	Team

Flora Jean Hyman (July 31, 1954 – January 24, 1986) was an American volleyball player. She was an Olympic silver medalist and played professional volleyball in Japan.

Hyman was the most popular volleyball player in the world due to her talent and charisma. For her achievements and pioneering role, she was inducted into the International Volleyball Hall of Fame in 1988.

== Early life and education ==
Hyman was the second of eight children born to George W. Hyman and Warrene Hyman (née Farrington). Her parents were both tall. Her mother was 5'11" and her father 6'2". She had two brothers and five sisters but was the tallest of them all, the next tallest after Flo being her father's height. As a child, Hyman was self-conscious about her rapid growth and the fact that she towered over her peers. In 1983, she recalled "When they were three foot tall, I was four foot tall. When they were four foot tall, I was five". Her nickname at school was "Jolly green giant", but her family and friends persuaded her to be proud of her height and to use it to her advantage. Flo's final adult height was just over 6 ft 5 in (1.96 m). In January 1979, in an interview, Hyman said that she found the stares and questions about her height that she got from strangers irritating, but she had learned to live with it.

When Hyman was 12, and standing 6 ft 2 in (1.88 m) tall, she began playing beach volleyball, usually with her sister Suzanne as a partner. In 1970, at the age of 16, Hyman started playing volleyball professionally. By the time Flo was a senior in high school, she had developed a lethal spike.

Hyman graduated from Morningside High School in Inglewood, California, and then attended El Camino College for one year before transferring to the University of Houston as that school's first female scholarship athlete. She spent three years there and led the Houston Cougars to two top-five national finishes, but did not complete her final year, instead focusing her attention on her volleyball career. Hyman said she would graduate once her volleyball career was over and that "You can go to school when you're 60. You're only young once, and you can only do this once".

While at Houston, Hyman was the first person to win the Broderick Award (Honda Sports Award) as the nation's best female collegiate volleyball player in 1977.

== Contribution to volleyball ==
"I had to learn to be honest with myself. I had to recognize my pain threshold. When I hit the floor, I have to realize it's not as if I broke a bone. Pushing yourself over the barrier is a habit. I know I can do it and try something else crazy. If you want to win the war, you've got to pay the price."

Hyman left Houston to play for the national team, based in Colorado. When Flo joined, the squad was sorely in need of leadership. Operating without a coach, it had a host of talented players with no one at the helm to guide them.

In 1975, the U.S. team floundered through qualifying rounds for the 1976 Olympics and failed to make it. In 1977, the team finished fifth at the World Championships. Hyman and her teammates looked forward to qualifying for and playing in the 1980 Olympics, but their dreams were curtailed when the United States boycotted the Moscow games.

Hyman played in the 1981 World Cup and the 1982 World Championship, when the US won the bronze medal. Hyman's powerful spike was referred to as the "Flying Clutchman". At the 1984 Olympics, Hyman, by now both the tallest and oldest member of the team, led the US to the silver medal, beaten by China in the final. The United States had defeated them earlier in the tournament.

== Death ==
After the Olympics, Hyman moved to Japan to play volleyball professionally, joining the Daiei women's squad in the Japan Volleyball League. She was so popular in Japan that she began a modeling and acting career there and was constantly in demand. She intended to return to the United States permanently in the summer of 1986, but never got the chance to do so. On January 24, 1986, Hyman collapsed while sitting on the sidelines after being substituted out in a game against Hitachi in Matsue. She told her team to keep fighting, then moments later slid to the floor. She was pronounced dead at 9:36 that evening.

At first, the cause of Hyman's death was stated to be a heart attack. Not fully accepting this finding, her family requested that an autopsy be performed in Culver City, California. The autopsy, which was held on January 30, dismissed the possibility of a heart attack. It was determined she had undiagnosed Marfan syndrome, which had caused a fatal aortic dissection. Apart from her height, nearsightedness, very long arms and large hands, she showed few other physical symptoms. The pathologist who performed the autopsy, Dr. Victor Rosen, said that Hyman physically had been in superb condition except for a dime-sized weak spot in her aorta. That small spot, less than an inch above her heart, had been there since her birth, and the artery had burst at that point as she sat on the sideline in Matsue. There was a blood clot around the tear, indicating that an earlier rip in the same spot had already begun to heal when the fatal second rupture occurred.

Doctors later discovered Hyman's brother Michael had an enlarged aorta, though he was clear of Marfan syndrome, and he underwent an open heart surgery afterwards. Experts believed Hyman was lucky to have survived as long as she did, playing a physically demanding sport such as volleyball.

Hyman was buried at Inglewood Park Cemetery, Inglewood, California, on January 31, 1986. Over 500 people attended the funeral service.

== Achievements ==
- AIAW National Player of the Year — 1976
- First winner of Honda Sports Award (formerly Broderick Award) in volleyball — 1977
- Three-time All-American
- World Cup top six players — 1981
- World Cup "best hitter" — 1981
- World Championship bronze medal — 1982
- Olympics silver medal — 1984
- The Flo Hyman Memorial Award is named in her honor.
- Flo Hyman appeared in a film entitled Order of the Black Eagle, in which she portrayed a knife-wielding mercenary named Spike. — 1985
- International Volleyball Hall of Fame — 1988
- University of Houston Athletics Hall of Honor — 1998
- Sports Illustrated greatest woman athletes of the century #69 — November 29, 1999
- The National Girls and Women in Sports Day (NGWSD) is celebrated throughout the US to remember and honor Flo Hyman. It was created and is supported by Girls Incorporated, Girl Scouts of the USA, the National Association for Girls and Women in Sport, the Women's Sports Foundation and the YWCA of the U.S.A.
- Team USA Hall of Fame — July 12, 2025
