= Eugene Selznick =

American volleyball player and coach (1930-2012)

Personal information
- Full name: Eugene Bleecher Selznick
- Born: March 19, 1930; Los Angeles, California, U.S.
- Died: June 10, 2012 (aged 82)
- Height: 6 ft 2 in (188 cm)
Medal record
Men's volleyball
Representing the United States
Pan American Games
Gold medal – first place	1959 Chicago	Team

Eugene Bleecher Selznick (March 19, 1930 – June 10, 2012) was an American volleyball player and coach. He played on world championship and Pan American Games championship teams. He was also inducted into the Southern California Jewish Sports Hall of Fame and the International Jewish Sports Hall of Fame.

== Early life ==
Selznick, who was Jewish, was born in Los Angeles, California. He also lived in Canoga Park, California. Selznick attended Manual Arts High School in Los Angeles. He was a physical education major in college, and first began to play volleyball in 1949.

== Volleyball career ==
Volleyball teams that Selznick played on won seven U.S. Open Volleyball Championships in 1951–53, 1956, 1960, 1965, and 1966, as well as seven runner-up titles. He was the USA Volleyball (USVBA) MVP in 1959, 1960, and 1962.

He was captain of the United States men's national volleyball team from 1953 to 1967. His teams won the 1960 and 1966 FIVB Volleyball Men's World Championships.

Selznick's teams also won gold medals at the Pan-American Games in 1955 and 1959. He was a member of the U.S. volleyball team at the Maccabiah Games in 1957, 1961, and 1973.

He was an early supporter of California beach volleyball, and was designated the "First King of Beach Volleyball". Selznick played with Ev Keller to win the 1950 California Beach Men's Open. He later played with partner Don McMahon. He won every Laguna Beach Open from 1955 to 1961.

Selznick introduced Wilt Chamberlain to volleyball, and took him on a national tour in the 1970s.

== Coaching career ==
Selznick coached the US women's volleyball team, which won the gold medal at the 1963 Pan American Games and the 1964 Olympic Games. He also coached women's teams that won six USVBA titles (1959–61, and 1963–65).

Selznick coached Olympic athletes Carl Henkel, Misty May, Holly McPeak, and Sinjin Smith.

== Honors ==
Selznick was named to the All America first team 10 times, beginning in 1951. He won the 1956 international competition All-Star team MVP honor of "Mr. All-World".

The FIVB named Selznick as one of the top American players of the 20th century. The U.S. Volleyball Hall of Fame honored him as the "All-Time Great Male Player". In 1995, Volleyball magazine called him the "Karch Kiraly of his era."

Selznick was elected to the Volleyball Hall of Fame in 1988. In 1990, he was inducted into the Southern California Jewish Sports Hall of Fame. He was inducted into the International Jewish Sports Hall of Fame in 2002.

== See also ==
- List of select Jewish volleyball players
