= Patti Bright =

American volleyball player (1940–2004)

Personal information
- Nationality: American
- Born: December 27, 1940; Chicago, Illinois, U.S.
- Died: December 8, 2004 (aged 63); Westwood, California, United States

Sport
- Sport: Volleyball

Patti Lucas Bright (December 27, 1940 – September 8, 2004) was an American volleyball player. She competed at the 1964 Summer Olympics and the 1968 Summer Olympics.
