= Volleyball at the 1959 Pan American Games =

Volleyball at the I959 Pan American Games
- Venue: Proviso High School

This page presents the results of the men's and women's volleyball tournament during the 1959 Pan American Games, which was held from August 28 to September 6, 1959 in Chicago, United States.

== Men's indoor tournament ==
=== Final ranking ===
| Place | Team |
|---|---|
| 1. | United States |
| 2. | Brazil: Urbano Brochado Santiago; Átila Gonçalves Martins; Décio Viotti de Azevedo; Roque Midlej Maron; Joao Carlos Quaresma; Sérgio Boris Barcellos Borges; Luiz Eduardo Pons; Álvaro Caira; Alexandre Eduardo P. Studart; Arlindo Lopes Correa; Joel Ramalho Jr.; José Silvério Ayres Lage; Coach: Sami Mehlinsky |
| 3. | Mexico: Takashia Matsumara; Jose Alcala; Rodolfo Rogel; Jesus Medina; Ramon Campos |
| 4. | Dominican Republic: Freddy Quezada; Carlos Morales; Rafael Justo Gonzalez; Antonio Martinez; Ulises Lewis; Andres Graciano; Ruben Lulo; Rolando Miranda; Mariano Crispin; Martin Moya; Tomas Bdet; Ernesto Marchena |
| 5. | Venezuela |
| 6. | Canada |
| 7. | Puerto Rico |
| 8. | Cuba |
| 9. | Haiti |

1959 Pan American Games winners

United States
Second title

== Women's indoor tournament ==
=== Final ranking ===
| Place | Team |
|---|---|
| 1. | Brazil: Martha Miraglia; Vera Trezoitko; Lílian Gilda Poetzcher; Norma Rosa Vaz; Lúcia Mendes de Moraes; Marina Conceição Celistre; Ingeborg Crause; Hilda Lassen; Lia Savignia de Freitas; Maria Alice Ricciardi; Iriana Silveira Sá Carvalho; Rosa Maria Teixeira Bastos |
| 2. | United States: Edith Conrad; Joanne Dennehy; Jean Gaertner; Lois Haraughty; Jayne Herwig; Beverly LaShaum; Vi McAllister; Lila Shanley; Juanita Shaw; Verna Stevenson; Jane Ward; Peely Willson; Coach: Manny Saenz |
| 3. | Peru |
| 4. | Puerto Rico |

1959 Pan American Games winners

Brazil
First title
