= Jean Gaertner =

American high jumper

Personal information
- Nationality: American
- Born: November 1, 1938 (age 87)

Sport
- Sport: Athletics
- Event: High jump

Jean Gaertner (born November 1, 1938) is an American athlete. She competed in the women's high jump at the 1960 Summer Olympics. She also competed in the volleyball tournament at the 1964 Summer Olympics.
