= 2008 Volleyball America's Cup squads =

This article shows all participating team squads at the 2008 Volleyball America's Cup, held from September 24 to September 28 in Cuiabá, Brazil.

== United States ==
- Head coach: Ron Larsen

#	Name	Date of birth	Weight	Height	Spike	Block
1	Matt Anderson	18.04.1987	000	000	000	000
3	Nils Nielsen	23.11.1981	000	000	000	000
5	Richard Lambourne	06.05.1975	90	190	324	312
6	Phillip Eatherton	02.01.1974	101	206	356	335
7	Jayson Jablonsky	23.10.1985	00	000	000	000
9	Jonathan Winder	04.01.1986	00	000	000	000
11	Brook Billings	30.04.1980	95	196	351	331
12	Andrew Hein	01.07.1984	00	000	000	000
16	Brandon Taliaferro	28.09.1977	00	000	000	000
17	Delano Thomas	26.01.1983	95	202	368	340
18	Scott Touzinsky	04.1982	00	000	000	000
