= Paul Sunderland =

American professional sportscaster and volleyball player

Personal information
- Full name: Paul Benedict Sunderland
- Nickname: Sundy
- Born: March 29, 1952 (age 74) Sherman Oaks, California, U.S.
- Home town: Sherman Oaks, California, U.S.
- Education: University of Oregon; Loyola Marymount University
- Height: 6 ft 5 in (1.96 m)
- Weight: 205 lb (93 kg)

Volleyball information
- Position: Outside hitter
- Number: 4

National team
- Years: Team
- 1976–1984: United States
Medal record
Men's volleyball
Representing the United States
Olympic Games
Gold medal – first place	1984 Los Angeles	Team
NORCECA Championship
Silver medal – second place	1981 Mexico City
Gold medal – first place	1983 Indianapolis

Paul Benedict Sunderland (born March 29, 1952) is an American professional sportscaster who resides in Los Angeles, California. He worked as the indoor volleyball play-by-play announcer for NBC Olympics’ coverage of the 2016 Summer Olympics, and has worked for the NBC Sports Group covering the Olympics since the 1992 Summer Olympics. He is a former collegiate basketball and volleyball player, and played on the United States national volleyball team that won a gold medal at the 1984 Summer Olympics.

== Early life and athletic career ==
Sunderland grew up in Sherman Oaks, in the San Fernando Valley region of Los Angeles, California. He attended Notre Dame High School, graduating in 1970. Sunderland played basketball and football at Notre Dame, and was a San Fernando Valley League All-League selection as both a wide receiver in football and as a forward in basketball. He started playing volleyball on the beach during his high school years, and states he had an immediate love for the game. He was recruited to the University of Oregon on a basketball scholarship. Between his freshman and sophomore college seasons, he began playing a great deal of beach volleyball, and he joined the University of Oregon's USVBA club team during his sophomore year. Sunderland states he set a goal to play on the United States national volleyball team. Following his sophomore year, he transferred to Loyola Marymount so he could play basketball and volleyball. Sunderland developed into one of Loyola's top volleyball players, earning All-America honors.

Sunderland was invited to try out for the United States national team in 1975, and he made the cut for the developmental squad. Sunderland moved up to the "A" squad, after the United States team failed to qualify for the 1976 Summer Olympics. He won U.S. Player of the Year awards in 1977, 1979 and 1982, at the USVBA national tournament. The United States failed to qualify for the 1980 Summer Olympics, held in Moscow, of the Soviet Union. The United States boycotted the games, making the failure to qualify a moot point. It was clear that the teams that the United States put together following the USVBA nationals were no longer adequate in order to compete on the international level.

The program hired former player Doug Beal as a full-time coach of the United States men's national team in 1977. He became the driving force for establishing a full-time, year-round volleyball training center. The facility was created in Dayton, Ohio, in 1978. California was the then-hotbed of volleyball talent, and many of the nation's top players would not relocate to Dayton in order to participate on the national team. The training center and the national team program were moved to San Diego, California, in 1981. Sunderland was now a veteran, and he had developed into a solid all-around player. He was joined on the national team in San Diego by a collection of the top collegiate talent from the California area, including Karch Kiraly, Dusty Dvorak, Steve Timmons, Craig Buck, Steven Salmons, Pat Powers and Doug Partie. The United States squad was among the world's elite teams by 1983. The turnaround culminated with the gold medal at the 1984 Summer Olympics in Los Angeles. Sunderland set winning an Olympic gold medal as a lifetime goal. Teammate Kiraly, said: "It is something that he really wanted, and it was really neat to see that one of the oldest guys on the team was also the most excited."

== Broadcasting career ==
Following the completion of his playing career, Sunderland pursued a career in broadcasting. Sunderland's athletic career formed the base for a broadcast career, initially working as a volleyball commentator. He was paired with former teammate Chris Marlowe. Sunderland's hiring was a morale boost to Marlowe, who had been doing broadcast work for a number of years, usually paired with personnel with little or no volleyball experience. Said Marlowe, "Early on I was working with broadcasters who may not have known a volleyball from a pineapple. When Paul moved into the color spot – that really clicked. We were old friends, played together on the national team for years, and our chemistry was fantastic." Sunderland's first assignment was in 1985 working with Marlowe at the NCAA Men's Volleyball West Regional match between San Diego State and Pepperdine. Said Marlowe: "I can ask Paul anything on the air, at any time, and he always has an answer."

From the color commentator spot, Sunderland moved on to do play-by-play, and extended into basketball and other sports. He soon took on work with the Clippers and Dodgers for Fox Sports Net. Starting in 1993, Sunderland covered Pac-10 basketball for ESPN. He subsequently was hired by NBC to cover a number of sports, including the NBA, WNBA and a variety of Olympic sports. Sunderland later served as an anchor on the Fox Sports Network.

In 1993, Sunderland began doing pre-game hosting for the Lakers. In 1995, Sunderland was working for Prime, NBC and ESPN. In the 2001–2002 season, the Lakers' long time play-by-play announcer, Chick Hearn, had to take time away while he recovered from heart surgery, and then more time was needed when he was injured in a fall and suffered a broken hip. Sunderland filled in for Chick Hearn for 56 games during the 2001–02 season. When Hearn died that year, in November 2002, he was announced as the new play-by-play announcer for the Los Angeles Lakers. He was only the second announcer ever hired by the team. He announced for the Lakers through 2005. Since 2005, Sunderland has worked as an announcer for NBC and Universal Sports, covering the Pac-12 in the sports of basketball, volleyball, track and field and tennis.

Sunderland served as the indoor volleyball play-by-play announcer for NBC Olympics’ coverage at the 2016 Summer Olympics, teaming with Kevin Barnett as analyst. He has worked doing the NBC Sports Group's summer Olympics coverage since the 1992 Games in Barcelona. Sunderland currently serves as a play-by-play announcer for both volleyball and men's basketball on ESPN.

== Awards ==
Sunderland earned All-America honors while at Loyola Marymount in 1975. He won USVBA Player of the Year awards at the national "Open" tournament in 1977, 1979 and 1982. In 1986 he was inducted into the USVBA Hall of Fame in Wichita, Kansas. That same year he was also inducted into the Loyola Marymount Hall of Fame.

Sunderland has twice won the Emmy Award for his play-by-play announcing with the Los Angeles Lakers.

== Personal life ==
Sunderland lives in Southern California with his wife, Maud-Ann. He met his wife at the 1977 World University Games in Bulgaria. Maud-Ann Tesch was a two-time national fencing champion from Sweden. She and Sunderland were married in Sweden in 1978. They have two children.
