= Men's NORCECA Final Six =

Indoor volleyball competition for men's national teams

- Current season, competition or edition: 2026 Men's NORCECA Final Six
- Sport: Volleyball
- Founded: 2021; 5 years ago
- First season: 2021
- No. of teams: 6
- Continents: NORCECA
- Most recent champions: United States (4th title)
- Most titles: United States (4 titles)

The Men's NORCECA Final Six is an international volleyball competition in NORCECA. It is organized by the sport's continental governing body, the North, Central America and Caribbean Volleyball Confederation (NORCECA), and is contested by the senior men's national teams of its member nations. It is part of the qualification system for the Men’s Pan American Cup and will award FIVB World Ranking points.

== Results ==
Year	Host	Champion	Runner-up	3rd place
2021; Details	(Dominican Republic); Santo Domingo	Mexico	Canada	United States
2022; Details	(Mexico); Tepic	Cuba	Canada	United States
2023; Details	(Canada); Edmonton	United States	Canada	Mexico
2024; Details	(Canada); Gatineau	United States	Canada	Mexico
2025; Details	(Puerto Rico); Ponce	United States	Puerto Rico	Dominican Republic
2026; Details	(Puerto Rico); Ponce	United States	Canada	Mexico

== Medal table ==
Rank	Nation	Gold	Silver	Bronze	Total
1	United States	4	0	2	6
2	Mexico	1	0	3	4
3	Cuba	1	0	0	1
4	Canada	0	5	0	5
5	Puerto Rico	0	1	0	1
6	Dominican Republic	0	0	1	1
Totals (6 entries)		6	6	6	18
