= James Polster =

American volleyball player (born 1979)

Jim Polster

Personal information
- Full name: James Andrew Polster
- Born: February 8, 1979 (age 47); St. Paul, Minnesota, U.S.
- Height: 6 ft 6 in (198 cm)
- Weight: 220 lb (100 kg)
- Spike: 139 in (352 cm)
- Block: 131 in (333 cm)

Volleyball information
- Number: 17

Career
Years	Teams
2002	Long Beach State 49ers

National team
2001–2007	United States
Medal record
Men's volleyball
Representing the United States
FIVB World League
Bronze medal – third place	2007 Katowice	Team
America's Cup
Gold medal – first place	2005 São Leopoldo	Team
Gold medal – first place	2007 Manaus	Team
Pan American Games
Silver medal – second place	2007 Rio de Janeiro	Team
Pan-American Cup
Gold medal – first place	2006 Tijuana/Mexicali	Team
NORCECA Championship
Gold medal – first place	2003 Culiacán	Team
Gold medal – first place	2005 Winnipeg	Team

James Andrew "Jim" Polster (born February 8, 1979) is a volleyball player from the United States, who played as an outside hitter for the Men's National Team. He competed at the 2002 FIVB Volleyball Men's World Championship in Japan. He played for Long Beach State University.

== Career ==
=== Coaching career ===
Since 2013, Polster has been an assistant coach for the Pacific Tigers women's volleyball team.

== Honors ==
- 2001 Summer Universiade — 1st place
- 2002 World Championship — 9th place (tied)
- 2003 World Cup — 4th place
- 2003 Pan American Games — 4th place
- 2003 NORCECA Championship — 1st place
- 2005 America's Cup — 1st place
- 2005 NORCECA Championship — 1st place
- 2005 World Grand Champions Cup — 2nd place
- 2006 World League — 10th place (tied)
- 2006 World Championship — 10th place
- 2006 Pan-American Cup — 1st place
- 2007 World Cup — 4th place
- 2007 America's Cup — 1st place
- 2007 Pan American Games — 2nd place
- 2007 World League — 3rd place
