= Vaafuti Tavana =

American volleyball player (born 1987)

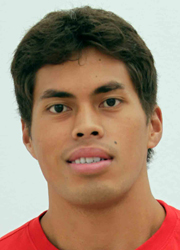
- Futi Tavana (Legavolley 2012)

Personal information
- Nationality: American
- Born: September 25, 1987 (age 39)
- Height: 6 ft 7 in (200 cm)
- Weight: 243 lb (110 kg)
- Spike: 142 in (360 cm)
- Block: 134 in (340 cm)

Volleyball information
- Number: 13 (national team)

Career
- Years: Team
- 2015: Jakarta BNI 46

National team
- Years: Team
- 2015: United States

Vaafuti Tavana (born September 25, 1987) is an American male volleyball player. He is part of the United States men's national volleyball team. On club level he plays for Jakarta BNI 46.
