= Taylor Averill =

American volleyball player (born 1992)

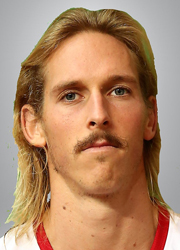
- Averill in 2018

Personal information
- Full name: Taylor Constantine Averill
- Born: March 5, 1992 (age 34); Portland, Oregon, U.S.
- Height: 6 ft 7 in (2.01 m)
- Weight: 207 lb (94 kg)
- Spike: 140 in (356 cm)
- Block: 132 in (335 cm)
- Education: University of California, Irvine; University of Hawaiʻi

Volleyball information
- Position: Middle blocker
- Current club: Toray Arrows

Career
Years	Teams
2012–2015; 2015–2017; 2017–2018; 2018–2019; 2020–2021; 2021–2023; 2023–2024; 2024–2025; 2025–	Hawaii Rainbow Warriors; Pallavolo Padova; Revivre Milano; Chaumont VB 52; AS Cannes; AZS Olsztyn; Projekt Warsaw; Vero Volley Monza; Toray Arrows

National team
2014–	United States
Medal record
Men's volleyball
Representing United States
Olympic Games
Bronze medal – third place	2024 Paris	Team
FIVB World Championship
Bronze medal – third place	2018 Italy/Bulgaria
FIVB World Cup
Gold medal – first place	2023 Japan
FIVB Nations League
Silver medal – second place	2023 Gdańsk
Silver medal – second place	2026 Ningbo
Pan American Cup
Silver medal – second place	2014 Tijuana
NORCECA Championship
Gold medal – first place	2023 Charleston

Taylor Constantine Averill (/ˈeɪvərəl/ AY-vər-əl; born March 5, 1992) is an American professional volleyball player who plays as a middle blocker for Toray Arrows and the U.S. national team.

== Personal life ==
Averill was born in Portland, Oregon on March 5, 1992. His family relocated to San Jose, CA where Averill graduated from Branham High School in 2010. Taylor’s father, Mark Averill, is a musician and Executive Pastor of Worship at Westgate Church. Mark and Taylor would perform “Piano Man Monday” taking request during their live sessions. Taylor’s mom, Lisa Averill, is the congregation pastor at Westgate Church. He has one brother, Grant Averill, who is a musician, producer, songwriter and instrumentalist in Los Angeles, CA.

His off-court interests include photography and his podcast entitled "Tallest Podcast on Earth."

== Career ==
He has played professionally in Italy, France and Poland. Averill won the French League Championship with AS Cannes in 2021 and was named Best Middle Blocker.

He was part of the U.S Men's Olympic team that participated in the 2024 Paris Olympic Games, winning a bronze medal.

== Honors ==
=== Club ===
- CEV Challenge Cup
  - 2023–24 – with Projekt Warsaw
- Domestic
  - 2020–21 French Championship, with AS Cannes

=== Individual awards ===
- 2021: French Championship – Best middle blocker
- 2024: Olympic Games – Best middle blocker
