= United States men's national volleyball team =

Men's national volleyball team representing the U.S.

United States
- Association: USA Volleyball
- Confederation: NORCECA
- Head coach: Karch Kiraly
- FIVB ranking: 4 ▲1 (1 October 2026)

Uniforms
Home	Away	Third

Summer Olympics
- Appearances: 13 (First in 1964)
- Best result: (1984, 1988, 2008)

World Championship
- Appearances: 18 (First in 1956)
- Best result: (1986)

World Cup
- Appearances: 12 (First in 1977)
- Best result: (1985, 2015, 2023)
- www.usavolleyball.org
Honours
Olympic Games
Gold medal – first place	1984 Los Angeles	Team
Gold medal – first place	1988 Seoul	Team
Gold medal – first place	2008 Beijing	Team
Bronze medal – third place	1992 Barcelona	Team
Bronze medal – third place	2016 Rio de Janeiro	Team
Bronze medal – third place	2024 Paris	Team
FIVB World Championship
Gold medal – first place	1986 France
Bronze medal – third place	1994 Greece
Bronze medal – third place	2018 Italy/Bulgaria
World Cup
Gold medal – first place	1985 Japan
Gold medal – first place	2015 Japan
Gold medal – first place	2023 Japan
Bronze medal – third place	1991 Japan
Bronze medal – third place	2019 Japan
World Grand Champions Cup
Silver medal – second place	2005 Japan
FIVB World League
Gold medal – first place	2008 Rio de Janeiro
Gold medal – first place	2014 Florence
Silver medal – second place	2012 Sofia
Bronze medal – third place	1992 Genoa
Bronze medal – third place	2007 Katowice
Bronze medal – third place	2015 Rio de Janeiro
FIVB Nations League
Silver medal – second place	2019 Chicago
Silver medal – second place	2022 Bologna
Silver medal – second place	2023 Gdańsk
Silver medal – second place	2026 Ningbo
Bronze medal – third place	2018 Lille
Pan American Games
Gold medal – first place	1955 Mexico	Team
Gold medal – first place	1959 Chicago	Team
Gold medal – first place	1967 Winnipeg	Team
Gold medal – first place	1987 Indianapolis	Team
Silver medal – second place	1963 São Paulo	Team
Silver medal – second place	1971 Cali	Team
Silver medal – second place	1995 Mar del Plata	Team
Silver medal – second place	2007 Rio de Janeiro	Team
Pan-American Cup
Gold medal – first place	2006 Mexicali
Gold medal – first place	2008 Winnipeg
Gold medal – first place	2009 Chiapas
Gold medal – first place	2010 San Juan
Gold medal – first place	2012 Santo Domingo
Gold medal – first place	2026 Cuernavaca
Silver medal – second place	2011 Gatineau
Silver medal – second place	2014 Tijuana
Silver medal – second place	2024 Santo Domingo
Bronze medal – third place	2021 Santo Domingo
Bronze medal – third place	2022 Gatineau
NORCECA Championship
Gold medal – first place	1973 Tijuana
Gold medal – first place	1983 Indianapolis
Gold medal – first place	1985 Santiago de los Caballeros
Gold medal – first place	1999 Monterrey
Gold medal – first place	2003 Culiacán
Gold medal – first place	2005 Winnipeg
Gold medal – first place	2007 Anaheim
Gold medal – first place	2013 Langley
Gold medal – first place	2017 Colorado Springs
Gold medal – first place	2023 Charleston
Gold medal – first place	2026 Moncton
Silver medal – second place	1971 Havana
Silver medal – second place	1981 Mexico City
Silver medal – second place	1987 Havana
Silver medal – second place	1991 Regina
Silver medal – second place	1993 New Orleans
Silver medal – second place	1995 Edmonton
Silver medal – second place	1997 Caguas / San Juan
Silver medal – second place	2001 Bridgetown
Silver medal – second place	2009 Bayamón
Silver medal – second place	2011 Mayagüez
Silver medal – second place	2019 Winnipeg
Bronze medal – third place	1969 Mexico City
Bronze medal – third place	1975 Los Angeles
Bronze medal – third place	1989 San Juan
NORCECA Final Six
Gold medal – first place	2023 Edmonton
Gold medal – first place	2024 Gatineau
Gold medal – first place	2025 Ponce
Gold medal – first place	2026 Ponce
Bronze medal – third place	2021 Santo Domingo
Bronze medal – third place	2022 Tepic
America Cup
Gold medal – first place	2005 São Leopoldo
Gold medal – first place	2007 Manaus
Silver medal – second place	1999 Tampa
Bronze medal – third place	2000 São Bernardo
Goodwill Games
Silver medal – second place	1986 Moscow

The United States men's national volleyball team represents the country in international competitions and friendly matches. The team is governed by USA Volleyball, and it has won six Olympic medals, three of them gold.

== History ==
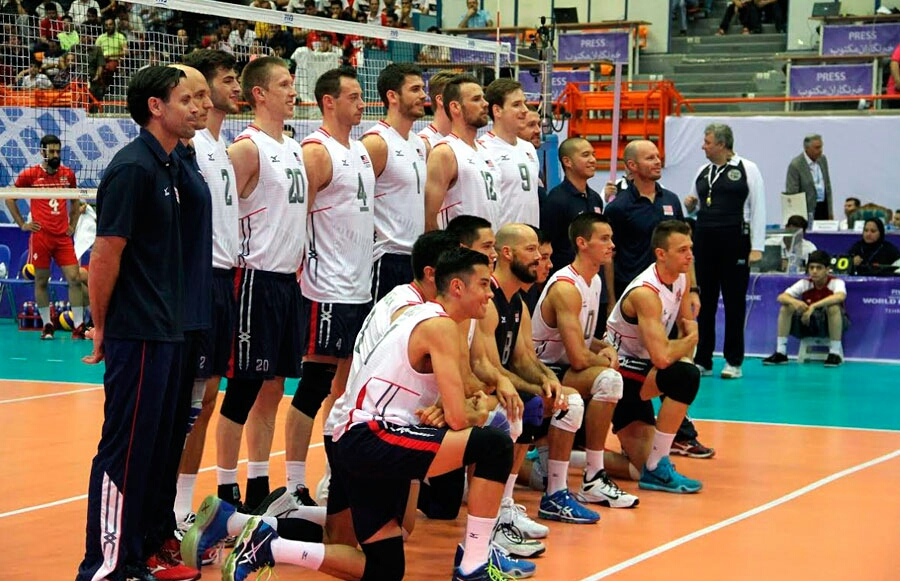
United States national volleyball team in World League 2015

As the birthplace of volleyball, the United States founded the first association to regulate the sport. The United States Volleyball Association was formed in 1927, and was the founding member of FIVB in 1947.

However, by the time of volleyball's international growth in the 1940s, the U.S. was no longer a major power. They competed in the inaugural volleyball Olympic tournament in 1964. The U.S. returned to the elite in the 1980s, winning the FIVB World Championship in 1986 in Paris, as well as four golds at the Pan American Games and eight at the NORCECA Championships. Of the nine times that the U.S. have competed at the World Cup, they have finished fourth five times, most recently in 2007. They won the event in 1985, and last time out in 2011 they finished in sixth place, eight points away from the medal positions. The team was a bronze medalist at the World Championships in 1994. Four years prior, in Italy, they finished sixth. Of the 14 times the United States have qualified for this competition, they have finished in the top 10 on eight occasions.

The U.S. won the World Cup in 1985 and the World Championship in 1986. The U.S. team clinched its first Olympic gold medal in 20 years when they defeated Brazil 3–1 to take gold at Beijing 2008. The team failed to defend their title in 2012, losing 3–0 to Italy in the quarterfinals for an equal-fifth finish. The U.S. won the 2015 World Cup title, where they got the first Rio 2016 Olympic qualification ticket. In September 2015 U.S. national team took part in 2015 World Cup. American players won 10 of 11 matches (the same result as Poland and Italy) and lost only to Poland (1–3). On September 23, 2015 they played their last game at the World Cup and defeated Argentina (3–1). The U.S. won the World Cup on a points tie-breaker and qualified for the 2016 Summer Olympics. It was their second victory in World Cup tournament (previous in 1985).

In the 2018 FIVB Volleyball Men's Nations League, the inaugural edition replacing the World League, the U.S. national team defeated the reigning Olympic champions and 9-time World League winners Brazil in straight sets for the bronze medal.

== Tournament record ==
=== Olympic Games ===
Year	Position	Squad
1964 Tokyo	9th place	Bright, Brown, Erickson, Murray, Hill, Griebenow, Hammer, Highland, Lang, Nelson, O'Hara, Ernie Suwara, Taylor and Velasco. Head Coach: Wilson
1968 Mexico	7th place	Alstrom, Bright, Davenport, Duke, Haine, Henn, May, Patterson, Rundle, Stanley, Suwara and Velasco. Head Coach: Coleman
1984 Los Angeles	Gold medal	Berzins, Buck, Duwelius, Dvorak, Kiraly, Marlowe, Powers, Salmons, Saunders, Sunderland, Timmons and Waldie. Head Coach: Beal.
1988 Seoul	Gold medal	Buck, Ctvrtlik, Fortune, Kiraly, Luyties, Partie, Root, Sato, Saunders, Stork, Tanner and Timmons. Head Coach: Dunphy
1992 Barcelona	Bronze medal	Becker, Briceno, Ctvrtlik, Fortune, Greenbaum, Hilliard, Ivie, Partie, Samuelson, Sato, Stork and Timmons. Head Coach: Sturm
1996 Atlanta	9th place	Ball, Ctvrtlik, Fortune, Hyden, Ivie, Lambert, Landry, Nygaard, Sorensen, Stork, Watts and Winslow. Head Coach: Sturm
2000 Sydney	11th place	Ball, Barnett, Hoff, Hyden, Lambert, Landry, McCaw, Millar, Nygaard, Roumain, Sullivan and Witt. Head Coach: Beal
2004 Athens	4th place	Ball (C), Barnett, Billings, Eatherton, Gardner, Hoff, Millar, Priddy, Salmon, Stanley, Sullivan and Suxho. Head Coach: Beal
2008 Beijing	Gold medal	Ball, Gardner, Hansen, Hoff (C), Lambourne, Lee, Millar, Priddy, Rooney, Salmon, Stanley and Touzinsky. Head Coach: McCutcheon
2012 London	5th place	Anderson, Holmes, Lambourne, Lee, Lotman, McKienzie, Priddy, Rooney, Smith, Stanley (C), Suxho and Thornton. Head Coach: Knipe
2016 Rio de Janeiro	Bronze medal	Anderson, Russell, Sander, Lee (C), K. Shoji, Priddy, Troy, Jaeschke, Christenson, Holt, Smith and E. Shoji. Head Coach: Speraw
2020 Tokyo	10th place	Anderson, Sander, Ensing, Stahl, K. Shoji (C), DeFalco, Christenson, Holt, Jaeschke, Muagututia, Smith, E. Shoji. Head Coach: Speraw
2024 Paris	Bronze medal	Anderson, Russell, Jendryk, DeFalco, Christenson, Holt, Maʻa, Jaeschke, Muagututia, Averill, Smith, E. Shoji. Head Coach: Speraw
Total	3 Titles	

=== FIVB World Championship ===
Year	Position	Squad
1956 France	6th place	—N/a
1960 Brazil	7th place	—N/a
1966 Czechoslovakia	11th place	—N/a
1970 Bulgaria	18th place	—N/a
1974 Mexico	14th place	—N/a
1978 Italy	19th place	—N/a
1982 Argentina	13th place	—N/a
1986 France	Gold medal	Dvorak, Saunders, Salmons, Ctvrtlik, Partie, Timmons, Buck, Stork, Sato, Powers, Kiraly. Head Coach: Dunphy
1990 Brazil	13th place	—N/a
1994 Greece	Bronze medal	—N/a
1998 Japan	9th place	—N/a
2002 Argentina	9th place	Ball, Seiffert, McKienzie, Sullivan, Bunker, Priddy, Millar, Salmon, Billings, Stanley, Polster, Naeve. Head coach: Beal
2006 Japan	10th place	Polster, Lambourne, Eatherton, Suxho, Priddy, Millar, Salmon, Hoff, Stanley, Gardner, McKienzie, Taliaferro. Head coach: McCutcheon
2010 Italy	6th place	Anderson, Rooney, Lee, Lambourne, Lotman, Winder, Priddy, Stanley, Hansen, Holmes, Clark, Holt. Head coach: Knipe
2014 Poland	7th place	Anderson, Sander, Lee, Lotman, K. Shoji, Ciarelli, Christenson, Clark, Holt, Reft, Smith, E. Shoji. Head coach: Speraw
2018 Italy/Bulgaria	Bronze medal	Anderson, Russell, Sander, Jendryk, Mcdonnell, K. Shoji, Patch, Christenson, Langlois, Holt, Averill, Smith, Watten, E. Shoji. Head coach: Speraw
2022 Poland/Slovenia	6th place	Anderson, A. Russell, Jendryk, Ensing, DeFalco, Christenson, K. Russell, Tuaniga, Muagututia, Averill, Smith, Briggs, Shoji, Kessel. Head coach: Speraw
2025 Philippines	5th place	Jendryk, Ensing, Pasteur, Garcia, Dagostino, Christenson, Maʻa, Robinson, Averill, Shoji, McHenry, Champlin, Knigge, Ewert, Marshman. Head coach: Kiraly
2027 Poland	Qualified	TBD
Total	1 Title	

=== FIVB World Cup ===
Year	Position	Squad
1977	10th place	—N/a
1985	Gold medal	—N/a
1989	4th place	—N/a
1991	Bronze medal	—N/a
1995	4th place	—N/a
1999	4th place	—N/a
2003	4th place	Ball, Sullivan, Suxho, Priddy, Millar, Salmon, Billings, Hoff, Stanley, Gardner, Polster, Naeve. Head coach: Beal
2007	4th place	Ball, Rooney, Polster, Lee, Lambourne, Priddy, Millar, Salmon, Hoff, Stanley, Hansen, Gardner. Head coach: McCutcheon
2011	6th place	Anderson, Rooney, Patak, Lee, Lotman, Priddy, Salmon, Holmes, Hansen, Thornton, Holt. Head coach: Knipe
2015	Gold medal	Anderson, Russell, Sander, Lee (C), Lotman, K. Shoji, Troy, Christenson, Holmes, Jablonsky, Holt, Smith, Watten, E. Shoji. Head Coach: Speraw
2019	Bronze medal	Anderson, Russell, Jendryk, Stahl, DeFalco, Saeta, Christenson (C), Holt, Patch, Maʻa, Tuaniga, Muagututia, Smith, E. Shoji. Head Coach: Speraw
2023; Japan World Cup	Gold medal	Anderson, Russell, Jendryk, Ensing, DeFalco, Dagostino, Christenson (C), Holt, Maʻa, Jaeschke, Muguatutia, Averill, Smith, E. Shoji. Head Coach: Speraw
Total	3 Titles	

=== FIVB World Grand Champions Cup ===
Year	Position	Squad
1993 Japan	5th place	—N/a
2005 Japan	Silver medal	Eatherton, Polster, Lambourne, Hoff, McKienzie, Millar, Priddy, Salmon, Stanley, Suxho, Tamas, Olree. Head Coach: McCutcheon
2013 Japan	5th place	Anderson, Rooney, Lee, K. Shoji, Priddy, Troy, Christenson, Tavana, Menzel, Clark, Holt, E. Shoji. Head coach: Speraw
2017 Japan	4th place	Anderson, Russell, Sander, Jendryk, K. Shoji, Jaeschke, Christenson, Patch, Clark, Holt, Averill, Smith, Watten, E. Shoji. Head coach: Speraw
Total	0 Title	

=== FIVB Volleyball World League ===
Year	Position	Squad
1990 Osaka	7th place	—N/a
1991 Milan	6th place	—N/a
1992 Genoa	Bronze medal	—N/a
1993 São Paulo	9th place	—N/a
1994 Milan	12th place	—N/a
1995 Rio de Janeiro	10th place	—N/a
2000 Rotterdam	6th place	—N/a
2001 Katowice	9th place	—N/a
2006 Moscow	T-10th place	—N/a
2007 Katowice	Bronze medal	Polster, Taliaferro, Lambourne, Lee, Priddy, Millar, Salmon, Hoff, Stanley, Hansen, Gardner. Head Coach: McCutcheon
2008 Rio de Janeiro	Gold medal	Ball, Rooney, Lambourne, Priddy, Millar, Salmon, Hoff, Stanley, Hansen, Gardner, Lee, Touzinsky. Head Coach: McCutcheon
2009 Belgrade	6th place	Rooney, Patak, Lee, Lambourne, Lotman, Suxho, Hein, Smith, Hoff (C), Stanley, Hansen, Jablonsky, Touzinsky, Reft. Head Coach: Knipe
2010 Córdoba	8th place	Anderson, Rooney, Patak, Lee, Lotman, Priddy, Hildebrand, Stanley, Hansen, Holmes, Holt, Reft. Head Coach: Knipe
2011 Gdańsk	7th place	Anderson, Rooney, Patak, Lee (C), Lambourne, Lotman, Thornton, Holmes, Stanley, Hansen, Holt, Touzinsky. Head Coach: Knipe
2012 Sofia	Silver medal	Anderson, Rooney, Lee, Lambourne, Lotman, Suxho, Priddy, Thornton, Holmes, Stanley (C), Smith, McKienzie. Head Coach: Knipe
2013 Mar del Plata	12th place	Anderson (C), Lee, Lambourne, Lotman, K. Shoji, Caldwell, Troy, Clark, Jablonsky, Holt, Smith, E. Shoji. Head Coach: Speraw
2014 Florence	Gold medal	Anderson, Rooney (C), Sander, Lee, Lotman, K. Shoji, Christenson, Holmes, Clark, Holt, Muagututia, E. Shoji. Head Coach: Speraw
2015 Rio de Janeiro	Bronze medal	Anderson, Russell, Sander, Lee (C), Lotman, K. Shoji, Priddy, Troy, Jaeschke, Christenson, Holmes, Holt, Smith, Watten, E. Shoji. Head Coach: Speraw
2016 Kraków	5th place	Anderson, Russell, Sander, Lee (C), K. Shoji, Priddy, Troy, Jaeschke, Christenson, Holt, Smith, E. Shoji. Head Coach: Speraw
2017 Curitiba	4th place	Sander, Jendryk, K. Shoji (C), Jaeschke, Christenson, Mcdonnell, Patch, Clark, DeFalco, Muagututia, Averill, Smith, Watten, E. Shoji. Head Coach: Speraw
Total	2 Titles	

=== FIVB Volleyball Nations League ===
Year	Position	Squad
2018	Bronze medal	Anderson, Russell, Sander, Jendryk, Shaw, Stahl, K. Shoji, DeFalco, McDonnell, Christenson, Holt, Patch, Sander, Jaeschke, Langlois, Averill, Smith (C), Watten, E. Shoji, Seif, Ensing. Head coach: Speraw
2019	Silver medal	Anderson, Russell, Sander (C), Jendryk, Shaw, Stahl, K. Shoji, DeFalco, McDonnell, Christenson, Holt, Patch, Sander, Jaeschke, Langlois, Averill, Smith, Watten, E. Shoji, Muagututia, Ensing. Head coach: Speraw
2021	7th place	Anderson, Sander (C), Jendryk, Ensing, Stahl, K. Shoji, DeFalco, Hanes, Christenson, Holt, Patch, Sander, Tuaniga, Jaeschke, Muagututia, Averill, Smith, Watten, E. Shoji. Head coach: Speraw
2022	Silver medal	Smith (C), Jendryk, Ensing, Stahl, DeFalco, A. Russell, Christenson, K. Russell, Dagostino, Kessel, Tuaniga, Mitchem, Muagututia, Shoji. Head coach: Speraw
2023	Silver medal	Anderson, A. Russell, Jendryk, DeFalco, Hanes, Dagostino, Christenson (C), Holt, Ma'a, Jaeschke, Muagututia, Averill, Smith, Shoji. Head coach: Speraw
2024	12th place	Anderson, Jendryk, Ensing, DeFalco, Hanes, Dagostino, Christenson (C), Holt, Ma'a, Muagututia, Averill, Shoji, Smith, Kessel, Ewert. Head coach: Speraw
2025	12th place	Briggs, Jendryk, Ensing, Isaacson, Garcia, Ma’a, Dagostino, Hobus, Rowan, Robinson, Shoji (C), Gasman, Flexen, McHenry, Champlin, Knigge, Ewert, Marshman. Head coach: Kiraly
2026	Silver medal	Anderson, Briggs, Jendryk, Robinson, DeFalco, Christenson, Averill, Ma'a, Rowan, Hanes, Hartke, Champlin, Shoji, McHenry, Knigge. Head coach: Kiraly
Total	0 Title	

=== Pan American Games ===
Year	Position	Squad
1955	Gold medal	—N/a
1959	Gold medal	—N/a
1963	Silver medal	—N/a
1967	Gold medal	—N/a
1971	Silver medal	—N/a
1987	Gold medal	—N/a
1995	Silver medal	—N/a
1999	7th place	—N/a
2007	Silver medal	—N/a
2011	5th place	—N/a
2015	6th place	—N/a
2019	6th place	—N/a
2023	Did not participate	—N/a
Total	4 Titles	

=== Pan American Cup ===
Year	Position	Squad
2006	Gold medal	—N/a
2008	Gold medal	Anderson, Patak, Tarr, Proper, Meerstein, Jablonsky, Winder, Hildebrand, Hein, Scheftic, Lotman, Reft. Head coach: Knipe
2009	Gold medal	Vance, Bittner, McKinney, Kneubuhl, Hildebrand, Tarr, Meerstein, Nielsen, Thornton, Holt, Zahn, Watten. Head coach: McLaughlin
2010	Gold medal	Watten, Tarr, McKinney, Thornton, Bittner, Lipsitz, Smith, Hildebrand, Clark, Brunner, Jablonsky, McGuire. Head coach: McLaughlin
2011	Silver medal	Menzel, Muagututia, Troy, Winder, Hein, Meehan, Shoji, Smith, Tarr, Price, Jablonsky, Watten. Head coach: Mayforth
2012	Gold medal	Davis, Rawson, Clark, Muagututia, Troy, DuFault, McDonnell, Ciarelli, Ammerman, Watten, Sander, Shoji. Head coach: Patchell
2013	5th place	Olbright, Taylor, Owens, Sunder, Brinkley, McDonnell, Price, Ammerman, Sangrey, Ratajczak, Lavaja, Sander. Head coach: Patchell
2014	Silver medal	Rowe, Crabb, Mcllvaine, Brinkley, Kevorken, Page, Averill, Dejno, La Cavera, Nally, Boldog, Olson. Head coach: Sullivan
2015	6th place	Kessel, Jendryk, Benesh, Brinkley, Langlois, Mcllvaine, Nally
2016	5th place	Langlois, Petty, Sander, Taylor, Tuaniga, Hutz, Johnson, Clark, Jendryk, Averill, DeFalco, Brinkley. Head coach: Larsen
2017	5th place	Jarman, Stahl, Jendryk, Greene, Sander, Langlois, Arnitz, Ensing, Seif, Wieczorek, Stadick, Saeta, Tuileta, Enriques. Head coach: Neilson
2018	7th place	—N/a
2019	5th place	—N/a
2021	Bronze medal	Holdaway, Kauling, Gillis, Pasteur, Mitchem, Lietzke, Sani, McHenry, Champlin, Wetter, Sloane, McCauley, Palma, Dagostino. Head coach: Read
2022	Bronze medal	Jenness, Shaw, Pasteur, Hanes, Sani, Gasman, Isaacson, Omene, Ezeonu, Worsley, Briggs, McCauley, Wildman, McHenry. Head coach: Read
2023	5th place	—N/a
2024	Silver medal	Robinson, Garcia, McHenry, Isaacson, Pasteur, Flexen, Gasman, Briggs, McIntosh, Wildman, Champlin, Marshman, Slight, Wetter. Head coach: Read
2026	Gold medal	Cryst, Wade, Wright, Reilly, Pasteur, Rogers, Foley, Diallo, Hobus, Thorne, Gooch, Tomkinson, Rosenthal, Kelly. Head coach: Read
Total	6 Titles	

=== NORCECA Championship ===
Year	Position	Squad
1969	Bronze medal	—N/a
1971	Silver medal	—N/a
1973	Gold medal	—N/a
1975	Bronze medal	—N/a
1977	5th place	—N/a
1979	5th place	—N/a
1981	Silver medal	—N/a
1983	Gold medal	—N/a
1985	Gold medal	—N/a
1987	Silver medal	—N/a
1989	Bronze medal	—N/a
1991	Silver medal	—N/a
1993	Silver medal	—N/a
1995	Silver medal	—N/a
1997	Silver medal	—N/a
1999	Gold medal	—N/a
2001	Silver medal	—N/a
2003	Gold medal	—N/a
2005	Gold medal	Olree, Polster, Tamas, Lambourne, Eatherton, Suxho, Millar, Salmon, Billings, Hoff, Stanley, McKienzie. Head Coach: McCutcheon
2007	Gold medal	Ball, Polster, Lambourne, Lee, Hoff, Millar, Priddy, Salmon, Stanley, Hansen, Gardner, Touzinsky. Head Coach: McCutcheon
2009	Silver medal	Anderson, Rooney, Patak, Lee, Lambourne, Lotman, Millar, Stanley, Hansen, Thorton, Jablonsky, Holt. Head coach: Knipe
2011	Silver medal	Anderson, Rooney, Patak, Lee, Lambourne, Lotman, Millar, Stanley (C), Hansen, Thorton, Jablonsky, Holt. Head coach: Knipe
2013	Gold medal	Anderson, Rooney (C), Caldwell, Lee, Priddy, Troy, Christenson, Menzel, Clark, Holt, Tavana, E. Shoji. Head coach: Speraw
2015	Did not participate	—N/a
2017	Gold medal	Anderson, Russell, Sander, Stahl, K. Shoji, Jaeschke, Christenson (C), McDonnell, Patch, Clark, Holt, Smith, Watten, E. Shoji. Head coach: Speraw
2019	Silver medal	Jendryk, Ensing, Stahl, DeFalco, J. Worsley, Carmody, Maʻa (C), B. Sander, Kessel, Wieczorek, Huhmann, G. Worsley, Dagostino, K. Russell. Head Coach: Hawks
2021	5th place	—N/a
2023	Gold medal	—N/a
2026	Gold medal	Anderson, Briggs, Jendryk, Pasteur, Rogers, Marshman, Maʻa, Rowan, Hanes, Hartke, E. Shoji, McHenry, Knigge, Ewert. Head Coach: Karch Kiraly
Total	11 Titles	

=== NORCECA Final Six ===
Year	Position	Squad
2021	Bronze medal	
2022	Bronze medal	
2023	Gold medal	
2024	Gold medal	
2025	Gold medal	
2026	Gold medal	Cryst, Wade, Wright, Reilly, Pasteur, Rogers, Foley, Diallo, Hobus, Thorne, Gooch, Tomkinson, Rosenthal, Kelly. Head coach: Priddy
Total	4 Titles	

=== Volleyball America's Cup ===
Year	Position	Squad
1998	14th place	—N/a
1999	Silver medal	—N/a
2000	Bronze medal	—N/a
2001	4th place	—N/a
2005	Gold medal	Lee, Robinson, Polster, Lambourne, Eatherton, Suxho, Seiffert, Salmon, Olree, Hoff, Toppel, McKienzie. Head coach: McCutcheon
2007	Gold medal	Ball, Billings, Eatherton, Hansen, Hoff, Lambourne, Millar, Polster, Priddy, Rooney, Salmon, Stanley. Head Coach: McCutcheon
2008	5th place	Anderson, Nielson, Eatherton, Lambourne, Jablonsky, Winder, Billings, Hein, Taliaferro, Thomas, Touzinsky. Head Coach: Larsen
Total	2 Titles	

=== Goodwill Games ===
Year	Position	Squad
1986	Silver medal	Ctvrtlik, Dvorak, Kiraly, Luyties, Miller, Partie, Powers, Salmons, Saunders, Tanner, Stork, Timmons
1990	4th place	—N/a
Total	0 Title	

== Team ==
=== Current squad ===
The American roster for the 2026 Nations League was announced on July 27, 2026.

Head coach: Karch Kiraly

No.	Name	Date of birth	Position	Height	2026 club
1	Matt Anderson	April 18, 1987	Outside hitter	6 ft 10 in (2.08 m)	(Japan) Nippon Steel Sakai Blazers
3	Mason Briggs	January 21, 2001	Libero	6 ft 0 in (1.82 m)	(France) Nice Volley-Ball
4	Jeffrey Jendryk	September 15, 1995	Middle blocker	6 ft 9 in (2.05 m)	(Greece) PAOK Thessaloniki
6	Cooper Robinson	August 8, 2002	Outside hitter	6 ft 8 in (2.02 m)	(Italy) You Energy Volley
8	TJ DeFalco	April 10, 1997	Outside hitter	6 ft 6 in (1.98 m)	(Japan) JTEKT Stings
11	Micah Christenson	May 8, 1993	Setter	6 ft 6 in (1.98 m)	(Italy) Rana Verona
13	Taylor Averill	March 5, 1992	Middle blocker	6 ft 7 in (2.01 m)	(Japan) Toray Arrows Shizuoka
14	Micah Maʻa	April 16, 1997	Setter	6 ft 4 in (1.92 m)	(Russia) Fakel Novy Urengoy
15	Andrew Rowan	July 29, 2003	Setter	6 ft 7 in (2.01 m)	(Italy) Vero Volley Monza
17	Jake Hanes	May 3, 1998	Opposite Spiker	6 ft 11 in (2.10 m)	(Greece) Olympiacos
18	Cole Hartke	April 20, 2006	Opposite Spiker	6 ft 11 in (2.11 m)	(United States) Pepperdine University
20	Ethan Champlin	November 29, 2001	Outside hitter	6 ft 3 in (1.91 m)	(Italy) Cuneo Volley
22	Erik Shoji	August 24, 1989	Libero	6 ft 0 in (1.82 m)	(Germany) Berlin Recycling Volleys
24	Merrick McHenry	October 17, 2000	Middle blocker	6 ft 7 in (2.00 m)	(Italy) Gas Sales Bluenergy Piacenza
26	Matthew Knigge	June 2, 1996	Middle blocker	6 ft 7 in (2.01 m)	(Poland) GKS Katowice

== Kit providers ==
The table below shows the history of kit providers for the United States national volleyball team.

Period	Kit provider
2000–2017	Nike; Mizuno
2017–2022	Adidas
2022–present	Mizuno

=== Sponsorship ===
Primary sponsors include: main sponsors like Liberty Mutual, Mizuno Corporation and Commerce Bancorp, other sponsors: Molten Corporation, Almond Breeze, Arirweave, National Car, CoSport, Oppiaperformance, Alamo and Muscleaidtape.

== See also ==
- United States women's national volleyball team
- United States national beach volleyball team
