= Bob Ctvrtlik =

American volleyball player (born 1963)

Personal information
- Full name: Robert Jan Ctvrtlik
- Born: July 8, 1963 (age 63); Long Beach, California, U.S.
- Height: 6 ft 4 in (193 cm)
- Education: Pepperdine University

Volleyball information
- Position: Outside hitter
- Number: 4

National team
1985–1996	United States
Medal record
Men's volleyball
Representing the United States
Olympic Games
Gold medal – first place	1988 Seoul	Indoor
Bronze medal – third place	1992 Barcelona	Indoor
World Championship
Gold medal – first place	1986 France	Indoor
Bronze medal – third place	1994 Greece	Indoor
FIVB World Cup
Gold medal – first place	1985 Japan
Bronze medal – third place	1991 Japan
Goodwill Games
Silver medal – second place	1986 Moscow
Pan American Games
Gold medal – first place	1987 Indianapolis	Indoor
Silver medal – second place	1995 Mar del Plata	Indoor

Robert Jan "Bob" Ctvrtlik (/stəˈvɜːrtlɪk/; born July 8, 1963) is a retired American volleyball player who is a three-time Olympian, Olympic gold medalist, and a former member of the International Olympic Committee. He is a 1985 graduate of Pepperdine University.

In 2007, Ctvrtlik was inducted into the International Volleyball Hall of Fame.

== Early life ==
Bob Ctvrtlik was born in Long Beach, California to Margaret and Josef Ctvrtlik. He attended Long Beach Wilson High School in Long Beach.

== Playing career ==
=== College ===
In 1982, Ctvrtlik became a member of the Long Beach City College Vikings volleyball team. He won the state championship and was selected as the MVP of the championship tournament.

In 1983, Ctvrtlik played for Long Beach State and was an All-American. He then transferred to Pepperdine to play his final collegiate year under the leadership and guidance of coaching legend Marv Dunphy, winning the 1985 NCAA title and being selected as the MVP of the tournament.

In 2009, Ctvrtlik was inducted into the Pepperdine Hall of Fame.

=== National team ===
After a successful college volleyball career, Ctvrtlik joined the United States national team. He won gold medals at the 1985 FIVB World Cup in Japan and the 1986 FIVB World Championship in France. In the 1988 Olympics in Seoul, Ctvrtlik earned a gold medal by helping to defeat the Soviet Union in the finals. In the 1992 Olympics in Barcelona, he became one of the national players who shaved their heads in protest of alleged officiating misconduct. The United States defeated Cuba in the consolation match to take home the bronze medal.

After the Barcelona games, Ctvrtlik went to Europe to play in the Italian Club League for Brescia along with fellow Olympian Scott Fortune. He returned to the national team in preparation for the 1996 Summer Olympics in Atlanta, winning a bronze medal at the 1994 FIVB World Championship in Greece. Ctvrtlik was selected as the Best Player in the World by the International Volleyball Federation in 1995, but the national team would fail to win a medal in the 1996 Olympics in Atlanta. He was regarded as one of the best serve receivers in the world.

=== Beach volleyball ===
Ctvrtlik was a beach volleyball player on the professional four-man circuit. He attained the "AAA" beach rating while playing on the two-man circuit.

== After volleyball ==
In 1996, Ctvrtlik was elected to the International Olympic Committee (IOC) Athlete's Commission, and then re-elected for an eight-year term at the 2000 Summer Olympics. He was appointed to the IOC in 1999. He was a founding board member of the World Anti-Doping Agency (WADA), and served on the IOC Reform Committee.

== Personal life ==
Ctvrtlik's business concerns include real estate rehabilitation projects as president of Green Street Properties, LLC in Huntington Beach, California, and import-exports, via his company, the Ciram Corporation.

Ctvrtlik and his wife Cosette have three sons: Josef (Joe), Erik, and Matthew. Joe played volleyball for Stanford University, Erik played at Vanderbilt University and Matthew played volleyball for Harvard.

Cvrtlik's father, Josef, a native of Czechoslovakia's Moravian region, was a graduate of Charles University in Prague and knew eight languages. He was imprisoned for three months during the German occupation for refusing to serve as a translator. Josef left his country in 1948 by taking a train from Prague to Bratislava, and then skiing to Austria with three friends. After 18 months in West Germany and five years in New Zealand working as a wool buyer, he moved to California in 1955 and worked as a professor at California State University, Long Beach (Long Beach State) before his death in 1983 from colon cancer.
