= Kyle Russell (volleyball) =

American volleyball player (born 1993)

Personal information
- Full name: Kyle Elton Russell
- Born: August 25, 1993 (age 33); Sacramento, California, U.S.
- Hometown: Loomis, California, U.S.
- Height: 6 ft 9 in (2.05 m)
- Weight: 216 lb (98 kg)
- Spike: 141 in (358 cm)
- Block: 135 in (343 cm)
- Education: UC Irvine

Volleyball information
- Position: Opposite
- Current club: (Greece) AO Milon Neas Smyrnis
- Number: 15

Career
Years	Teams
2016–2017; 2017–2019; 2019–2020; 2020–2021; 2021-2022; 2022; 2025-	(Poland) MKS Bedzin (Germany) Berlin Recycling Volleys (France) AS Cannes (South Korea) Suwon KEPCO Vixtorm (South Korea) Daejeon Samsung Bluefangs (France) Arago de Sète (South Korea) Incheon KAL Jumbos

National team
2018–	United States
Medal record
Men's volleyball
Representing United States
FIVB Nations League
Silver medal – second place	2022 Bologna
NORCECA Championship
Silver medal – second place	2019 Winnipeg

Kyle Elton Russell (born August 25, 1993) is an American volleyball player who has played in Europe and South Korea.

He competed for 4 years on the University of California Irvine men's volleyball team.

He currently plays for Incheon Korean Air Jumbos in the South Korean V-League League.
