= Dave Saunders (volleyball) =

American volleyball player (born 1960)

Personal information
- Full name: David Patrick Saunders
- Born: October 19, 1960 (age 66); Seattle, Washington, U.S.
- Height: 190 cm (6 ft 3 in)
- Education: University of California, Los Angeles

Volleyball information
- Position: Outside hitter
- Number: 2

National team
1983–1988	United States
Medal record
Men's volleyball
Representing the United States
Olympic Games
Gold medal – first place	1984 Los Angeles	Team
Gold medal – first place	1988 Seoul	Team
World Championship
Gold medal – first place	1986 France	Team
FIVB World Cup
Gold medal – first place	1985 Japan
Goodwill Games
Silver medal – second place	1986 Moscow
Pan American Games
Gold medal – first place	1987 Indianapolis	Team

David Patrick Saunders (born October 19, 1960) is an American former volleyball player and two-time Olympian. He was a member of the United States national volleyball team that won the gold medal at the 1984 Summer Olympics in Los Angeles, and was named one of the outstanding players of the tournament. Four years later, when Seoul hosted the 1988 Summer Olympics, he once again won a gold medal.

Saunders also helped the United States national team to gold medals at the 1985 FIVB World Cup, 1986 FIVB World Championship, and 1987 Pan American Games. He also won a silver medal at the 1986 Goodwill Games.

== College ==
Saunders played for the UCLA Bruins and won NCAA Championships in 1979, 1981, and 1982. He was a first-team All-American in 1982.

Saunders was inducted into the UCLA Hall of Fame in 2022.

== Awards ==
- Three-time NCAA Champion — 1979, 1981, 1982
- First-team All-American — 1982
- Two-time Olympic gold medal — 1984, 1988
- FIVB World Cup gold medal — 1985
- Goodwill Games silver medal — 1986
- FIVB World Championship gold medal — 1986
- Pan American Games gold medal — 1987
- UCLA Hall of Fame — 2022

== See also ==
- USA Volleyball
