= Kyle Ensing =

American volleyball player (born 1997)

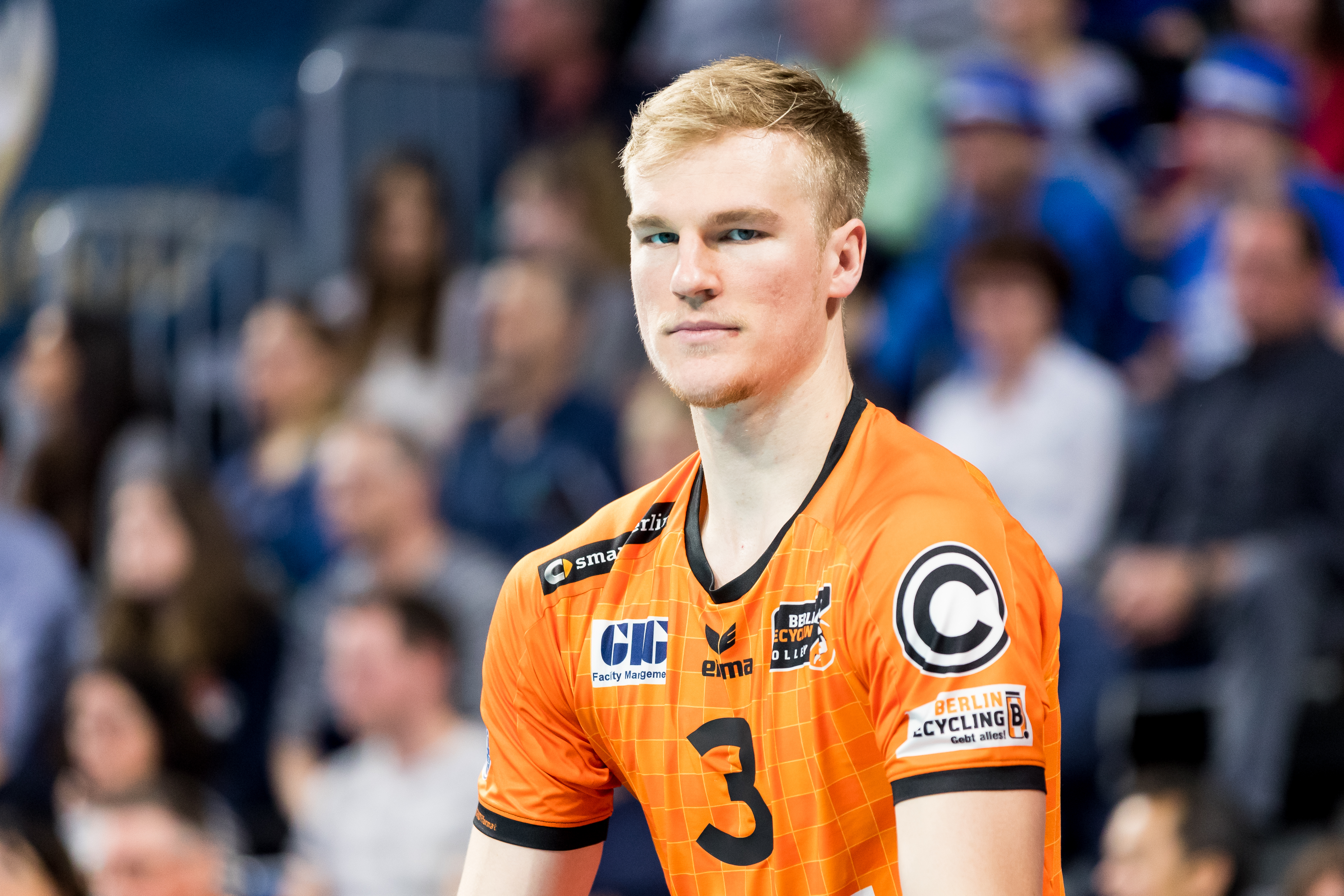
- Ensing in 2020

Personal information
- Full name: Kyle Wayne Ensing
- Born: March 6, 1997 (age 29); Santa Clarita, California, U.S.
- Height: 6 ft 7 in (2.01 m)
- Weight: 220 lb (100 kg)
- Spike: 144 in (366 cm)
- Block: 139 in (353 cm)
- Education: CSULB

Volleyball information
- Position: Opposite

Career
Years	Teams
2016–2019	Long Beach State
2019–2020	Berlin Recycling Volleys
2020–2022	Maccabi Tel Aviv
2022–2024	SNVBA
2024–2026	Warta Zawiercie

National team
2018–	United States
Medal record
FIVB World Cup
Gold medal – first place	2023 Japan
FIVB Nations League
Silver medal – second place	2022 Bologna
Bronze medal – third place	2018 Lille
NORCECA Championship
Silver medal – second place	2019 Winnipeg

Kyle Wayne Ensing (born March 6, 1997) is an American professional volleyball player who plays as an opposite hitter for the U.S. national team.

== Personal life ==
Ensing is from Santa Clarita, California and attended high school at Valencia High School. He primarily played basketball and football in his youth and discovered interest in volleyball in high school. For his performance on the volleyball team, he was named the 2014 All Santa Clarita Valley Player of the Year as well as the Daily News All-Area Player of the Year.

His brother, Eric, also played volleyball at Long Beach State.

== Career ==
=== Long Beach State ===
Ensing played volleyball for Long Beach State, where he made the final four all four years, winning NCAA titles in 2018 and 2019. While there, he played alongside fellow members of the U.S. national team, TJ DeFalco and Joshua Tuaniga.

=== National team ===
Ensing has participated in four major tournaments with the U.S. men's national team: 2018, 2019 and 2021 Nations League and 2019 NORCECA Championship. In June 2021, he was named to the 12-player 2020 Summer Olympics roster.

== Honors ==
=== Club ===
- CEV Champions League
  - 2024–25 – with Aluron CMC Warta Zawiercie
  - 2025–26 – with Aluron CMC Warta Zawiercie
- Domestic
  - 2019–20 German SuperCup, with Berlin Recycling Volleys
  - 2019–20 German Cup, with Berlin Recycling Volleys
  - 2020–21 Israeli Championship, with Maccabi Tel Aviv
  - 2021–22 Israeli Cup, with Maccabi Tel Aviv
  - 2021–22 Israeli Championship, with Maccabi Tel Aviv
  - 2023–24 French Championship, with SNVBA
  - 2024–25 Polish SuperCup, with Aluron CMC Warta Zawiercie
  - 2025–26 Polish Championship, with Aluron CMC Warta Zawiercie

=== Individual awards ===
- 2017: AVCA Second-Team All-American
- 2018: AVCA First-Team All-American
- 2018: All-Big West First-Team
- 2018: NCAA National Championship – All- tournament team
- 2019: All-Big West First-Team (Player of the Year)
- 2019: AVCA First-Team All-American
