= Brenden Sander =

American volleyball player (born 1995)

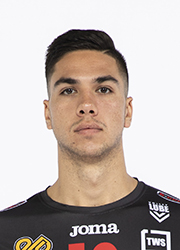

Personal information
- Full name: Brenden Lee Sander
- Nationality: (United States) American
- Born: December 22, 1995 (age 30); Huntington Beach, California, U.S.
- Height: 6 ft 5 in (1.95 m)
- Spike: 140 in (360 cm)
- Education: Brigham Young University

Volleyball information
- Position: Outside hitter

Career
Years	Teams
2015–2018; 2018–2019; 2019–2021; 2021–2022; 2023	(United States) Brigham Young University (Italy) Volley Lube (Poland) Czarni Radom; Qatar S.C. (Greece) Panathinaikos

National team
2018–2022	United States
Medal record
Men's volleyball
Representing United States
NORCECA Championship
Silver medal – second place	2019 Canada

Brenden Lee Sander (born December 22, 1995) is an American volleyball player. He is a former member of the United States men's national volleyball team.

His older brother Taylor Sander is also a volleyball player, who was a member United States men's national volleyball team.

== Sporting achievements ==
=== College ===
- National championships
  - 2016 NCAA national championship
  - 2017 NCAA national championship

=== Clubs ===
- FIVB Club World Championship
  - Poland 2018 – with Cucine Lube Civitanova

=== Youth national team ===
- 2014 U21 NORCECA Championship
- 2015 U21 Pan American Cup

== Personal life ==
In 2022, Sander married former women's national team player Paige Tapp.
