= 1985 FIVB Volleyball Men's World Cup =

Volley-ball competition

1985 Men's World Cup
Tournament details
- Host country: Japan
- Dates: 22 November – 1 December
- Teams: 8
- Venues: 4 (in 4 host cities)

Final positions
- Champions: United States (1st title)
- Runners-up: Soviet Union
- Third place: Czechoslovakia
- Fourth place: Brazil

Tournament awards
- MVP: (United States) Karch Kiraly

The 1985 FIVB Men's World Cup was held from 22 November to 1 December 1985 in Japan. The World Cup brought together eight teams. The matches were played in Round Robin. Each team played each other (a total of 7 matches per team).

== Qualification ==
Means of qualification	Date	Host	Vacancies	Qualified
Host country	—	―	1	Japan
Volleyball at the 1984 Summer Olympics	29 Jul – 11 Aug 1984	(United States) Los Angeles	1	United States
1982 FIVB Volleyball Men's World Championship	1–15 October 1982	Argentina	1	Soviet Union
1985 Men's European Volleyball Championship	29 Sep – 4 Oct 1985	Netherlands	1	Czechoslovakia
1985 Men's NORCECA Volleyball Championship	27 Sep – 6 Oct 1985	(Dominican Republic) Santiago de los Caballeros	1	~~Cuba~~; Argentina*
1985 Men's South American Volleyball Championship	24 Jul – 1 Aug 1985	(Venezuela) Caracas	1	Brazil
Asian Qualifier		Hong Kong	1	South Korea
1983 Men's African Volleyball Championship	7–14 December 1983	(Egypt) Port Said	1	Egypt
Total			8	

* Cuba replaced by Argentina.

== Results ==
Pos	Team	Pld	W	L	Pts	SW	SL	SR	SPW	SPL	SPR
1	United States	7	7	0	14	21	4	5.250	369	243	1.519
2	Soviet Union	7	5	2	12	18	8	2.250	347	251	1.382
3	Czechoslovakia	7	5	2	12	16	11	1.455	0	0	—
4	Brazil	7	4	3	11	16	11	1.455	0	0	—
5	Argentina	7	3	4	10	12	14	0.857	313	324	0.966
6	Japan	7	2	5	9	9	15	0.600	253	288	0.878
7	South Korea	7	2	5	9	8	17	0.471	250	328	0.762
8	Egypt	7	0	7	7	1	21	0.048	149	327	0.456

Location: Osaka

Date		Score		Set 1	Set 2	Set 3	Set 4	Set 5	Total
22 Nov	Czechoslovakia	3–1	Egypt	12–15	15–11	15–8	15–3		57–37
22 Nov	Soviet Union	3–0	South Korea	15–4	15–7	15–3			45–14
22 Nov	United States	3–0	Brazil	15–6	15–11	15–13			45–30
22 Nov	Japan	3–0	Argentina	15–5	15–13	15–6			45–24
23 Nov	United States	3–2	Soviet Union	11–15	19–17	15–9	9–15	15–12	69–68
23 Nov	Argentina	3–0	Egypt	15–4	15–7	15–6			45–17
23 Nov	Brazil	3–0	South Korea	15–8	15–5	15–8			45–21
23 Nov	Czechoslovakia	3–0	Japan	15–10	15–9	15–6			45–25
24 Nov	Argentina	3–1	Czechoslovakia	15–9	15–12	12–15	15–7		57–43
24 Nov	United States	3–0	South Korea	15–13	15–3	15–1			45–17
24 Nov	Soviet Union	3–2	Brazil	15–7	15–13	4–15	5–15	15–9	54–59
24 Nov	Japan	3–0	Egypt	15–5	15–3	15–6			45–14

Location: Nagoya

Date		Score		Set 1	Set 2	Set 3	Set 4	Set 5	Total
26 Nov	Soviet Union	3–0	Egypt	15–6	15–4	15–6			45–16
26 Nov	United States	3–2	Argentina	15–7	13–15	15-17	17–15	15–13	75–67

Location: Hiroshima

Date		Score		Set 1	Set 2	Set 3	Set 4	Set 5	Total
26 Nov	Czechoslovakia	3–1	South Korea	15–8	12–15	15–9	17–15		59–47
26 Nov	Brazil	3–1	Japan	2–15	15–7	15–8	17–15		49–45
27 Nov	Czechoslovakia	3–2	Brazil	?–?	?–?	?–?	?–?	?–?	?–?
27 Nov	South Korea	3–2	Japan	15–8	15–9	12–15	9–15	15–10	66–57

Location: Nagoya

Date		Score		Set 1	Set 2	Set 3	Set 4	Set 5	Total
27 Nov	Soviet Union	3–0	Argentina	15–3	15–7	15–11			45–21
27 Nov	United States	3–0	Egypt	15–11	15–8	15–0			45–19

Location: Tokyo

Date		Score		Set 1	Set 2	Set 3	Set 4	Set 5	Total
30 Nov	United States	3–0	Japan	15–10	15–5	15–2			45–17
30 Nov	Czechoslovakia	3–1	Soviet Union	17–15	15–9	6–15	15–6		53–45
30 Nov	Brazil	3–1	Argentina	14–16	15–8	15–8	15–12		59–44
30 Nov	South Korea	3–0	Egypt	15–4	15–7	15–11			45–22
01 Dec	United States	3–0	Czechoslovakia	15–11	15–5	15–9			45–25
01 Dec	Argentina	3–1	South Korea	15–3	10–15	15–12	15–10		55–40
01 Dec	Brazil	3–0	Egypt	15–6	15–8	15–10			45–24
01 Dec	Soviet Union	3–0	Japan	15–7	15–7	15–5			45–19

== Final standing ==
Rank	Team
1st place, gold medalist(s)	United States
2nd place, silver medalist(s)	Soviet Union
3rd place, bronze medalist(s)	Czechoslovakia
4	Brazil
5	Argentina
6	Japan
7	South Korea
8	Egypt

1985 Men's World Cup champions

United States
1st title

Team roster
Karch Kiraly, Craig Buck, Dusty Dvorak, Aldis Berzins, Patrick Powers, Steven Salmons, Dave Saunders, Steve Timmons, Jeffrey Stork, Douglas Partie, Robert Ctvrtlik
Head coach
Gary Sato

== Awards ==
- Most valuable player
  (United States) Karch Kiraly
- Best spiker
  (Brazil) Renan Dal Zotto
- Best blocker
  (Czechoslovakia) Stefan Christianski
- Best setter
  (United States) Dusty Dvorak
- Best defender
  (United States) Aldis Berzins
- Best on the pitch
  (Soviet Union) Yaroslav Antonov
