= Brian Thornton =

American volleyball player and coach (born 1985)

Personal information
- Full name: Brian Charles Thornton
- Born: April 22, 1985 (age 41); Huntington Beach, California, U.S.
- Height: 6 ft 3 in (1.90 m)
- Weight: 194 lb (88 kg)
- Spike: 129 in (327 cm)
- Block: 124 in (314 cm)
- Education: University of California, Irvine

Volleyball information
- Position: Setter
- Number: 10

Career
Years	Teams
2009–2010; 2010–2011; 2011–2012	(United States) Irvine UC (Spain) Club Voleibol Zaragoza (France) Chaumont VB (Poland) Jastrzębski Węgiel

National team
2009–	United States
Medal record
Men's volleyball
Representing United States
World League
Silver medal – second place	2012 Sofia
NORCECA Championships
Silver medal – second place	2011 Puerto Rico
- Last updated: May 29, 2015

Brian Charles Thornton (born April 22, 1985) is an American former volleyball player and current associate head coach of the Oklahoma Sooners volleyball team. He played for the 2007 NCAA national champions, the University of California, Irvine. He played for the United States national team and appeared in the 2012 Summer Olympics.

== Career ==
=== College ===
Thornton played volleyball for UC Irvine from 2004 to 2007. In 2004, he played 16 games, averaging 9.31 set assists. The following season, he averaged 12.57 set assists and had 1,320. Thornton then had 1,548 set assists in 2006. His 13.70 average led the nation. He also made the All-American second team.

In 2007, Thornton helped UC Irvine win the NCAA Division I men's volleyball national championship. He averaged 13.27 set assists, and he made the All-American second team and the NCAA All-Tournament team. Thornton's 1,645 assists that season was a new school record. His 4,662 career set assists was also a school record.

=== International ===
Thornton joined the U.S. national team in 2009. He helped the team win gold medals at the 2009 and 2010 Pan American Cups.

In 2011, Thornton played in the FIVB World League, NORCECA Men's Continental Championship, and FIVB World Cup. He averaged 5.19 assists per set, and his 514 assists was the most of any U.S. setter that year. At the 2012 Summer Olympics, Thornton had two points.

Thornton played professionally in France in 2010-11.

== Personal ==
Thornton was born in Huntington Beach, California, on April 22, 1985. He attended San Clemente High School. Thornton is 6 feet, 3 inches tall and weighs 187 pounds. He has two younger siblings.
