= Dustin Watten =

American volleyball player (born 1986)

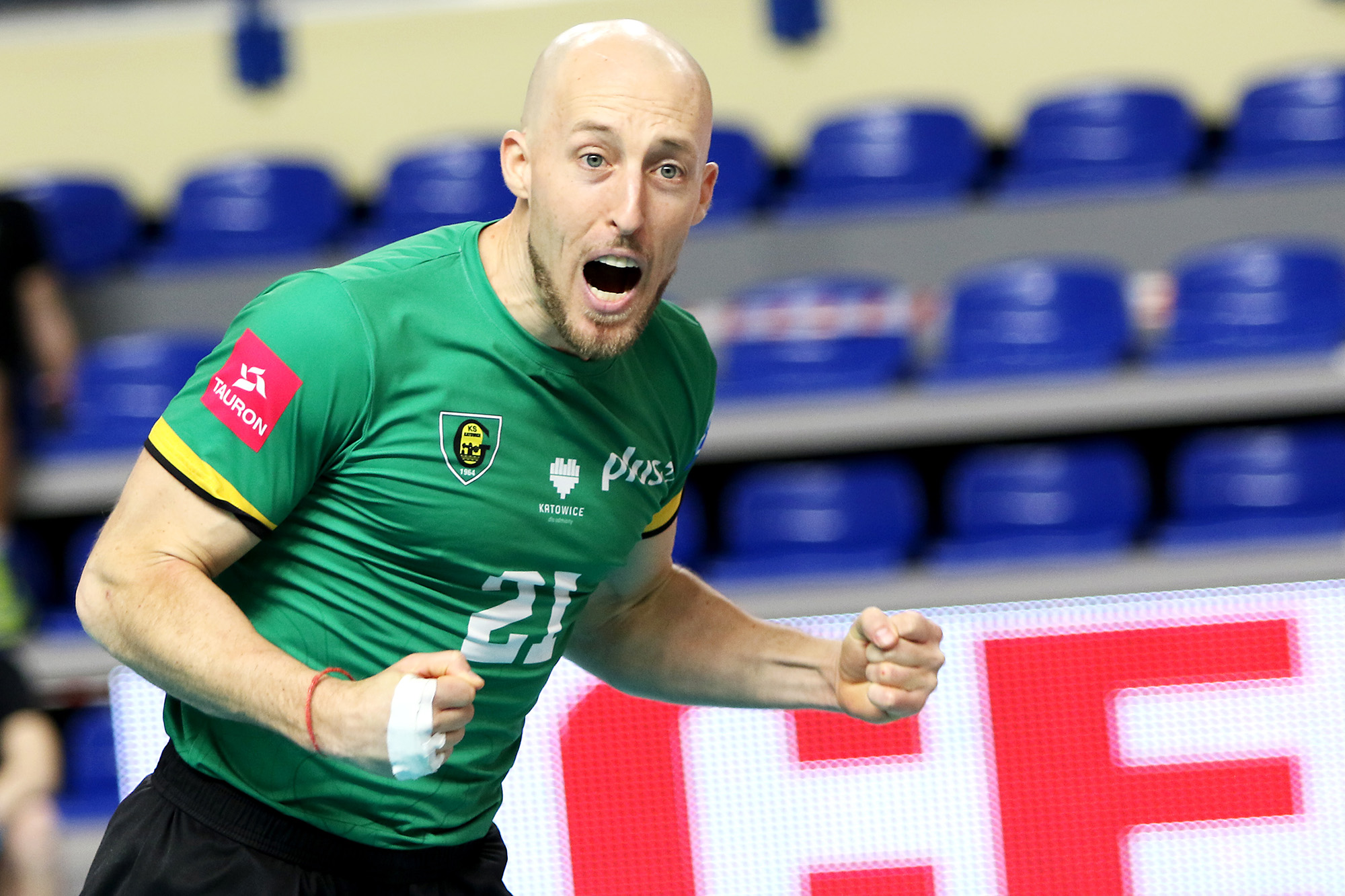
- Watten as GKS Katowice player

Personal information
- Full name: Dustin Joseph Watten
- Born: October 27, 1986 (age 40); Long Beach, California, U.S.
- Height: 6 ft 0 in (1.83 m)
- Weight: 180 lb (80 kg)
- Education: California State University, Long Beach

Volleyball information
- Position: Libero

Career
| Years | Teams |
|---|---|
| 2005–2009; 2010–2012; 2012–2013; 2013–2014; 2014–2015; 2015–2016; 2016–2018; 2018–2019; 2019–2021; 2021–2023 | Long Beach State Beach; Raision Loimu; AS Orange Nassau; VBCE Maringá; GFC Ajaccio VB; Maxéville Nancy VB; Czarni Radom; Berlin Recycling Volleys; GKS Katowice; LUK Lublin |

National team
| 2014–2021 | United States |
Medal record
Men's volleyball
Representing United States
FIVB World Championship
| Bronze medal – third place | 2018 Italy/Bulgaria |
FIVB World Cup
| Gold medal – first place | 2015 Japan |
FIVB World League
| Bronze medal – third place | 2015 Rio de Janeiro |
FIVB Nations League
| Bronze medal – third place | 2018 Lille |
Pan American Cup
| Gold medal – first place | 2010 San Juan |
| Gold medal – first place | 2012 Santo Domingo |
| Silver medal – second place | 2011 Gatineau |
NORCECA Championship
| Gold medal – first place | 2017 Colorado Springs |

Dustin Joseph Watten (born October 27, 1986) is an American former professional volleyball player. As a member of the U.S. national team, he won the 2015 World Cup and the 2018 World Championship bronze medal.

== Personal life ==
Watten is the son of Kim and Jeff Watten, and he has two brothers: Chris and Cody. In 2004, he graduated from Woodrow Wilson Classical High School in Long Beach. In 2009, he graduated from California State University, Long Beach.

== Honors ==
=== Club ===
- Domestic
  - 2018–19 German Championship, with Berlin Recycling Volleys

=== Individual awards ===
- 2012: Pan American Cup – Best digger
