= Ryan Ammerman =

American volleyball player (born 1985)

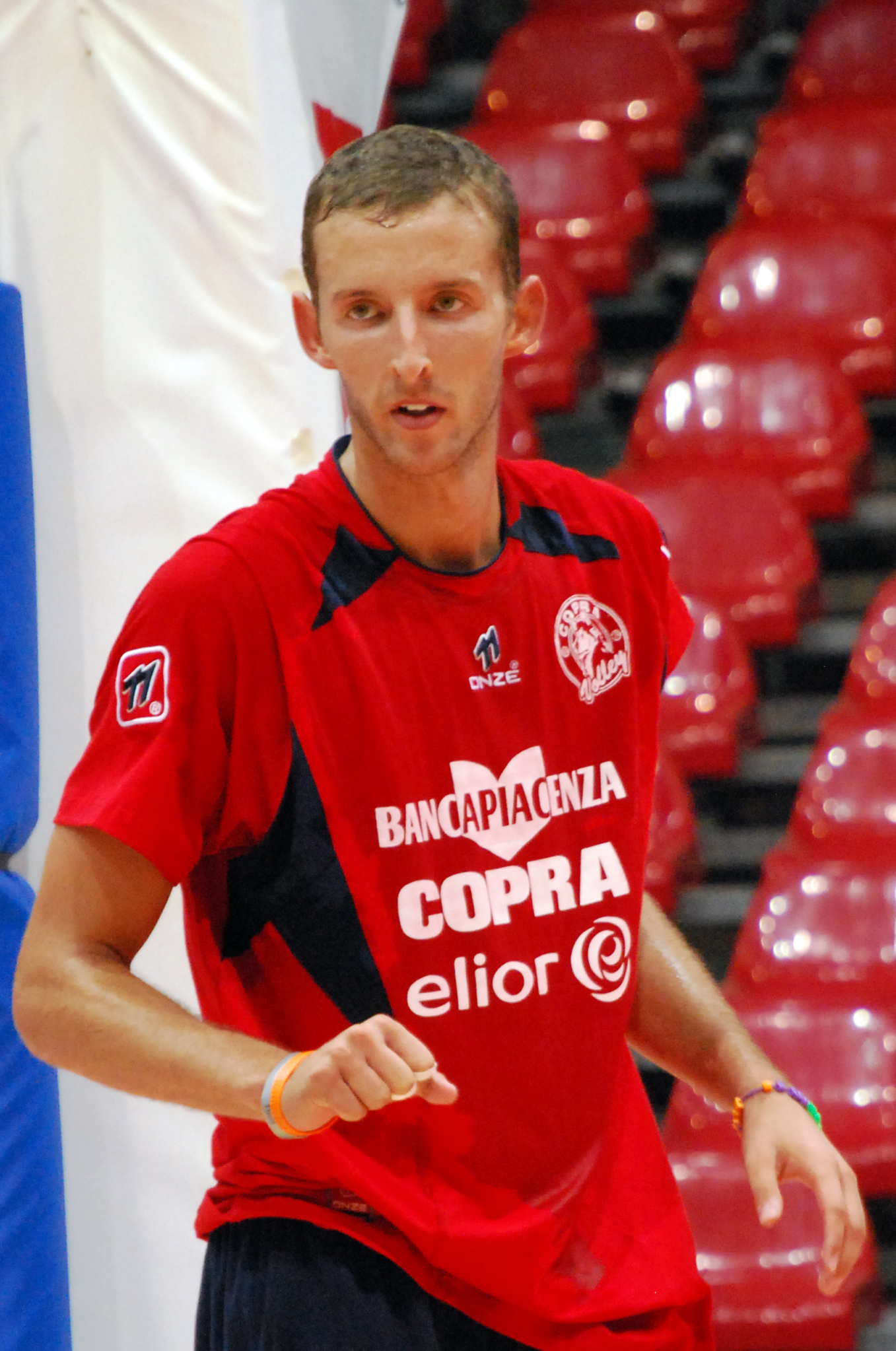

Personal information
- Nationality: American
- Born: December 30, 1985 (age 40)
- Height: 6 ft 9 in (205 cm)
- Weight: 198 lb (90 kg)
- Spike: 134 in (340 cm)
- Block: 130 in (330 cm)

Volleyball information
- Number: 5 (national team)

National team
2009-	United States

Ryan Ammerman (born December 30, 1985) is an American male volleyball player. He is part of the United States men's national volleyball team.
