= Alfredo Reft =

American volleyball player (born 1982)

Alfee Reft
Current position
- Title: Head coach
- Team: LOVB San Francisco

Biographical details
- Born: December 15, 1982 (age 43); Oxnard, California, U.S.
- Education: Hawaii

Playing career
- 2003: UCSB
- 2004–2006: Hawaii

Coaching career (HC unless noted)
- 2010–2012: Minnesota (assistant)
- 2016–2018: (United States) U.S. men & U.S. women (volunteer assistant)
- 2018–2019: Illinois (assistant)
- 2020–2022: San Diego (associate HC)
- 2023–2025: UCLA
- 2026–present: LOVB San Francisco

Alfredo "Alfee" Reft (born December 15, 1982) is an American volleyball coach and former player.

== Career ==
=== Playing career ===
Reft transferred to Hawaii from UC Santa Barbara. He played as a libero and was named an AVCA First-Team All-American as well as Asics/Volleyball Magazine Defensive Player of the Year in 2005 after totaling 272 digs. He set a Hawaii single-season record with 2.67 digs per set. He also earned AVCA Second-Team All-America honors in 2006 following his senior season.

Reft was part of the United States men's national volleyball team at the 2014 FIVB Volleyball Men's World Championship in Poland. He played for Dinamo Moscow.

=== Coaching career ===
Reft has serves as an assistant coach at various universities (Minnesota, Illinois, and San Diego). At San Diego, he helped the Toreros reach their first ever NCAA Final Four appearance in school history in 2022.

He was named head coach for UCLA Bruins women's volleyball team on December 19, 2022. Following his third season in 2025, he stepped down from the team, and was later named head coach for the professional team LOVB San Francisco.

== Head coaching record ==
Record table
Season	Team	Overall	Conference	Standing	Postseason
UCLA (Pac-12) (2023–2024)
2023	UCLA	18–12	10–10	6th	
UCLA (Big Ten) (2024–2025)
2024	UCLA	14–15	8–12	T–10th	
2025	UCLA	19–13	12–8	T–6th	NCAA Second Round
UCLA:		51–40 (.560)	30–30 (.500)		
Total:		51–40 (.560)			
