= Riley Salmon =

American volleyball player

Personal information
- Nationality: American
- Born: July 2, 1976 (age 50); Amarillo, Texas, U.S.
- Height: 6 ft 6 in (198 cm)
- Education: Pierce College

Volleyball information
- Position: Outside hitter
- Number: 10

National team
United States
Medal record
Men's volleyball
Representing the United States
Olympic Games
Gold medal – first place	2008 Beijing	Team competition
FIVB World League
Gold medal – first place	2008 Rio	Team competition
Bronze medal – third place	2007 Katowice	Team competition
NORCECA Championship
Gold medal – first place	2003 Culiacan	Team competition
Gold medal – first place	2005 Winnipeg	Team competition
Gold medal – first place	2007 Anaheim	Team competition
Silver medal – second place	2001 Bridgetown	Team competition
America's Cup
Gold medal – first place	2005 São Leopoldo	Team competition
Gold medal – first place	2007 Manaus	Team competition

Riley Salmon (born July 2, 1976) is an American volleyball player. He graduated from Clear Creek High School in League City, Texas, and played two years of varsity volleyball at Pierce College from 1994–96, before joining the men's national team in May 2001 as an outside hitter. He competed at the 2004 Olympics and the 2008 Olympics. At the 2008 Olympics, he helped Team USA win the gold medal.

In July 2009, it was announced that Salmon faced a four-month suspension by the FIVB for violating anti-doping policy rules. Salmon was taking Avapro, a medication approved by the FIVB for hypertension, however the drug's replacement Avalide contained a banned substance, hydrochlorothiazide. The FIVB stated that it was not intentional doping. The suspension period began on May 27, 2009.

In September 2009, it was announced that Salmon would play for Vivo/Minas, a big Brazilian team from Belo Horizonte - Minas Gerais. He will play beside two Brazilian players who were also at the Olympics in 2008: André Heller and André Nascimento.

Salmon is currently the head coach for the Concordia Irvine Eagles.
