= Kevin Barnett (volleyball) =

American volleyball player

Personal information
- Full name: Kevin Rees Barnett
- Born: May 14, 1974 (age 52) Naperville, Illinois, U.S.
- Education: Pepperdine University
- Height: 198 cm (6 ft 6 in)
- Weight: 209 lb (95 kg)

Volleyball information
- Position: Outside hitter
- Number: 14

National team
- Years: Team
- 2000–2004: United States

Kevin Rees Barnett (born May 14, 1974) is an American former volleyball player. He played for the United States national team at the 2000 and 2004 Summer Olympics.

== Television ==
Barnett worked as a broadcaster for the Pac-12 Networks and FOX Sports West in Los Angeles, as well as teaming with Paul Sunderland for indoor volleyball during the Olympics. He is currently announcing Athletes Unlimited volleyball matches with Salima Rockwell on ESPNU.
