= Mitchell Stahl =

American volleyball player (born 1994)

Personal information
- Nationality: American
- Born: August 31, 1994 (age 32); Chambersburg, Pennsylvania, U.S.
- Height: 6 ft 8 in (2.03 m)
- Weight: 220 lb (100 kg)
- Spike: 140 in (360 cm)
- Block: 135 in (344 cm)
- Education: University of California

Volleyball information
- Position: Middle blocker
- Current club: Tianjin Food Group
- Number: 7

Career
| Years | Teams |
|---|---|
| 2014–2017; 2017–2018; 2018–2019; 2019–2020; 2020–2021; 2021–2022; 2022–2023 | UCLA Bruins; Paris Volley; Tours VB; Chaumont VB 52; Greenyard Maaseik; Stal Nysa; Tianjin Food Group |

National team
| United States |
Medal record
Men's volleyball
Representing United States
FIVB World Cup
| Bronze medal – third place | 2019 Japan |
FIVB Nations League
| Silver medal – second place | 2022 Bologna |
NORCECA Championship
| Gold medal – first place | 2017 Colorado Springs |
| Silver medal – second place | 2019 Winnipeg |

Mitchell Stahl (born August 31, 1994) is an American professional volleyball player, a member of the U.S. national team, and a participant at the Olympic Games Tokyo 2020.

== Honors ==
=== Clubs ===
- National championships
  - 2018/2019 French Championship, with Tours VB
  - 2018/2019 French Cup, with Tours VB

=== Individual awards ===
- 2017: Pan American Cup – Best Middle Blocker
