= Steven Salmons =

American volleyball player

Steve Salmons

Personal information
- Born: Steven Edward Salmons; July 3, 1958 (age 68); Saint Joseph, Missouri, U.S.
- Height: 6 ft 4 in (1.93 m)
- Education: University of California, Los Angeles

Volleyball information
- Position: Middle blocker
- Number: 3 (national team); 29 (UCLA)

National team
1978–1986	United States
Medal record
Men's volleyball
Representing the United States
Olympic Games
Gold medal – first place	1984 Los Angeles	Team
World Championship
Gold medal – first place	1986 Paris
FIVB World Cup
Gold medal – first place	1985 Japan
Goodwill Games
Silver medal – second place	1986 Moscow
NORCECA Championship
Gold medal – first place	1983 Indianapolis

Steven Edward "Steve" Salmons (born July 3, 1958) is an American former volleyball player. He helped the United States men's national volleyball team win the gold medal at the 1984 Summer Olympics in Los Angeles. He also helped the national team win gold medals at the 1985 FIVB World Cup and the 1986 FIVB World Championship, thus achieving the "triple crown".

== College ==
Salmons was a four-year starter on the UCLA volleyball team (1977–‘79, ‘81) as a middle blocker. While at UCLA, Salmons was a teammate of legendary beach volleyball player Sinjin Smith.

Salmons was named the 1979 NCAA Player of the Year, leading the Bruins to the National Championship with a 31–0 record - the first undefeated team in NCAA history.

In 1979, Salmons suffered a severe back injury while representing the United States at the Pan Am Games, yet was able to return to play for the Bruins at the end of the 1981 season, helping spark a five-game victory over the Tim Hovland and Steve Timmons led USC Trojans to earn another NCAA title. He was named to the NCAA All-Tournament team (his third time '78,'79,'81) along with MVP Karch Kiraly and Steve Gulnac. In addition to earning the 1979 NCAA Player of the Year, Salmons was named All-American in 1978 and 1979.

In 2000, Salmons was inducted into the UCLA Hall of Fame. On March 30, 2001, UCLA retired his jersey (No. 29) in pre-match ceremonies.

== Personal life ==
Salmons currently resides in San Diego and owns the real estate company Commercial Properties Service (CPS). He and his wife Cathy have three children: William (Reece) Salmons, Taylor Salmons, and Alexis Salmons. His son Reece was a setter for UCLA.
