= Jeff Stork =

American volleyball player

Personal information
- Born: Jeffrey Malcolm Stork; July 8, 1960 (age 66); Longview, Washington, U.S.
- Height: 6 ft 3 in (191 cm)
- Education: Pepperdine University

Volleyball information
- Position: Setter
- Number: 10

National team
1985–1996	United States
Medal record
Men's volleyball
Representing the United States
Olympic Games
Gold medal – first place	1988 Seoul	Team
Bronze medal – third place	1992 Barcelona	Team
World Championship
Gold medal – first place	1986 France	Team
FIVB World Cup
Gold medal – first place	1985 Japan
Bronze medal – third place	1991 Japan
Goodwill Games
Silver medal – second place	1986 Moscow
Pan American Games
Gold medal – first place	1987 Indianapolis	Team

Jeffrey Malcolm Stork (born July 8, 1960) is a former American volleyball player and coach. He is also a three-time Olympian. He was a member of the United States national teams that won the gold medal in the 1988 Summer Olympics and the bronze medal in the 1992 Summer Olympics, and also competed in the 1996 Summer Olympics. He is regarded as one of the best setters of all time, and was known to play well under pressure.

In 2012, Stork was inducted into the International Volleyball Hall of Fame.

== College ==
Stork played college volleyball for Pepperdine and helped his team reach the finals in 1983 and 1984. He made the All-Tournament Team in both of those seasons. He was an All-American in all three seasons he played at Pepperdine.

In 2008, Stork was inducted into the Pepperdine Hall of Fame.

== National team ==
After college, Stork joined the national team, and he helped them win the "triple crown" of the 1985 FIVB World Cup in Japan, the 1986 FIVB World Championship in France, and the 1988 Olympics in Seoul. In addition, he helped the United States to the gold medal in the 1987 Pan American Games in Indianapolis. He won a bronze medal at the 1992 Olympics in Barcelona and also participated in the 1996 Olympics in Atlanta.

== Italian Volleyball League ==
In 1990, Stork played in the Italian Volleyball League and helped his team Maxicono win the championship. He was also named the MVP of the Italian League in 1993 with Mediolanum Gonzaga.

== Coaching ==
Stork was the coach of the women's volleyball team at Cal State Northridge. He retired in 2020 after coaching for 18 years, with a record of 239 wins and 282 losses.

== Awards ==
- Three-time All-American — 1982, 1983, 1984
- All-Tournament Team — 1983, 1984
- FIVB World Cup gold medal — 1985
- FIVB World Championship gold medal — 1986
- Pan American Games gold medal — 1987
- Olympic gold medal — 1988
- Italian Volleyball League Champion — 1990
- Olympic bronze medal — 1992
- Italian Volleyball League MVP — 1993
- Pepperdine Hall of Fame — 2008
- International Volleyball Hall of Fame — 2012
