= Sean Rooney (volleyball) =

American volleyball player

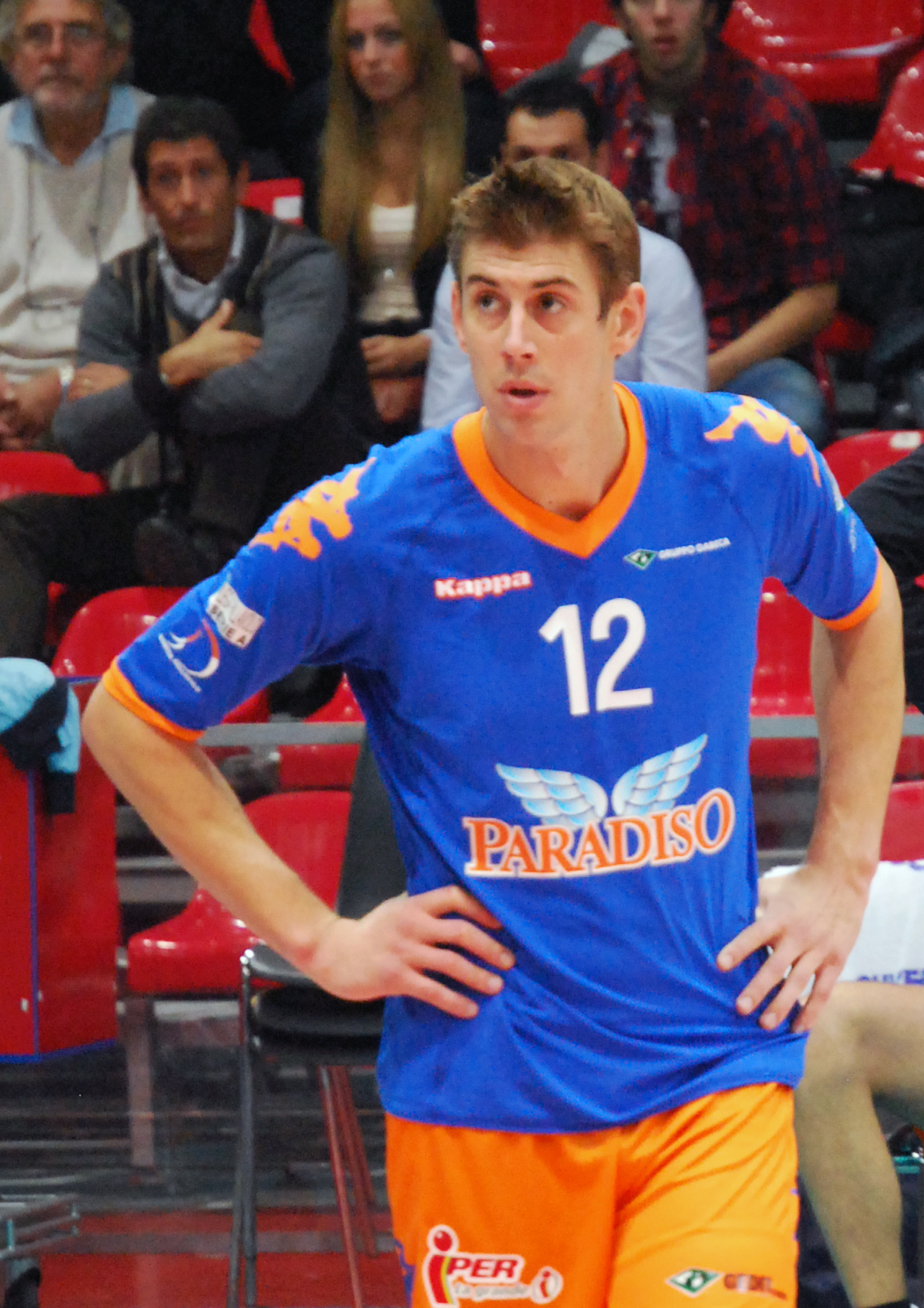

Personal information
- Full name: Sean Michael Rooney
- Nationality: American
- Born: November 13, 1982 (age 43); Wheaton, Illinois, United States
- Height: 6 ft 9 in (2.06 m)
- Weight: 220 lb (100 kg)
- Spike: 139 in (354 cm)
- Block: 132 in (336 cm)
- Education: Pepperdine University

Volleyball information
- Position: Outside hitter
- Number: 2 (national team)

National team
2007–2014	United States
Medal record
Men's volleyball
Representing the United States
Olympic Games
Gold medal – first place	2008 Beijing	Team
World League
Gold medal – first place	2008 Rio	Team
Gold medal – first place	2014 Florence	Team
Silver medal – second place	2012 Sofia	Team
Bronze medal – third place	2007 Katowice	Team
Pan American Games
Silver medal – second place	2007 Rio	Team
- Last updated: December 28, 2014

Sean Michael Rooney (born November 13, 1982) is an American former volleyball player who played on the United States national team. Rooney was a gold medalist at the 2008 Olympics in Beijing and FIVB World League (2008, 2014). He also competed in the 2012 Olympics in London.

== Early life ==
Rooney was born in Wheaton, Illinois. He attended Wheaton Warrenville South High School and was named the 2001 Illinois State Co-Player of the Year (Greg Pochopien – Carl Sandburg High School), and led the team to the state championship. In addition to volleyball, he also played golf, soccer and basketball.

== College ==
Rooney attended Pepperdine in Malibu, California, where he graduated in 2005 with a degree in business administration.

During his NCAA career, he was a four-time American Volleyball Coaches Association (AVCA) All-American. By the end of his career, he ranked second nationally among NCAA Division I-II players in points per game, as he had 6.35 in 2005. He was named the 2005 Division I-II National Player of the Year.

In 2005, he led Pepperdine to the NCAA Men's Volleyball Championship, as they defeated UCLA on the Bruins' home floor in five sets. It was the first time in 35 years UCLA lost at home during the NCAA tournament. Rooney was named the Most Valuable Player of the Final Four.

== Professional ==
During the winters of 2006 and 2007, Rooney played for the Cheonan Hyundai Capital Skywalkers in the South Korean League, where he garnered Most Valuable Player awards after leading the team to two consecutive Korean League titles.

In the 2007–08 season, he played for Dinamo-Yantar in Kaliningrad, Russia.

In the 2008–09 season, Rooney played with Fakel Novy Urengoy volleyball club based in Russia.

=== AVP ===
Rooney briefly joined the AVP beach volleyball tour, where he played in 2005 and 2006. His highest placing was fifth, which he achieved three times.

== National team ==
=== International ===
In 2008, Rooney was named "best spiker" of the NORCECA Continental Olympic Qualifying tournament on January 6–11 in Caguas, Puerto Rico. He finished the tournament with 46 points on 43 kills and three blocks. The U.S. men won the tournament and qualified for the 2008 Olympic Games.

In 2007, Rooney was named the Most Valuable Player of the U.S. men's match against Egypt at the FIVB World Cup. Rooney scored 18 points on 15 kills, two blocks and one ace as the United States won in straight sets.

=== Olympics ===
Rooney made his Olympic debut at the 2008 Summer Olympics, helping Team USA to a gold medal. He also was on the 2012 Olympic team that reached the quarterfinals.
