= William Price (volleyball) =

American volleyball player (born 1987)

Personal information
- Nationality: American
- Born: October 7, 1987 (age 39)
- Height: 6 ft 5 in (196 cm)
- Weight: 207 lb (94 kg)
- Spike: 146 in (370 cm)
- Block: 142 in (360 cm)

Volleyball information
- Number: 23 (national team)

Career
- Years: Team
- 2015: Beijing Baic Motor

National team
- Years: Team
- 2015: United States

William Price (born October 7, 1987) is an American male volleyball player. He was part of the United States men's national volleyball team. On club level he played for Beijing Baic Motor Men's Volleyball Team.
