= 2005 Volleyball America's Cup =

The 2005 Copa América of Volleyball was the fifth edition of the Men's Volleyball Tournament, the America Cup of Volleyball, and it was played between August 3 and August 7 in the town of São Leopoldo, Rio Grande do Sul, Brazil. All matches were played in the Celso Morbach Gimnasium, in São Leopoldo.

The competition is not one of the main events in the FIVB international calendar, but it is perceived by the participating countries as an important test for their national teams. Those with a younger group were using the event to provide international experience to their players.

The format adopted was very simple. Six teams, divided in two groups of three, played for the berths in the semifinals. That being the case, only the last team of each group failed to qualify, the remaining four advancing to the semifinals in the following system: winner of Group A versus second place of Group B and winner of Group B versus second place of Group A. The winners of the semifinal matches would play for the title, whereas the losers played for the third place. If two or more teams were to have the same number of victories in the first round, the team with more sets won would take precedence, if the tie persisted, then the set average (sets won minus sets lost) would decide the final standing.

== First round ==
All times are in the Brazilian official time, which is three hours behind UTC (UTC−3 / GMT−3).

=== Group A ===
Team	M	W	L	SW	SL	SA
Brazil	2	2	0	6	0	6
Argentina	2	1	1	3	4	-1
Venezuela	2	0	2	1	6	-5

August 3, 20:30
Brazil	3 - 0	Argentina
25 /21 25 /23 25 /19
August 4, 20:30
Brazil	3 - 0	Venezuela
25 /21 31 /29 25 /19
August 5, 18:30
Argentina	3 - 1	Venezuela
25 /23 20 /25 25 /22 25 /23

=== Group B ===
Team	M	W	L	SW	SL	SA
United States	2	1	1	5	3	2
Cuba	2	1	1	3	3	0
Canada	2	1	1	3	5	-2

August 3, 18:30
Canada	3 - 2	United States
24/26 25 /17 25 /22 22/25 15 /13
August 4, 18:30
United States	3 - 0	Cuba
25 /17 27 /25 27 /25
August 5, 20:30
Cuba	3 - 0	Canada
25 /23 25 /17 25 /22

== Final round ==
=== Semi finals ===
- August 6

Brazil	3 – 0	Cuba	14:00; Match time: 1h08
25 /20 25 /21 25 /11
United States	3 – 2	Argentina	16:00
25 /22 21 /25 25 /22 23 /25 15 /10

=== Third place match ===
- August 7

Cuba	3 – 0	Argentina	12:30; Match time: 1h07
28 /26 25 /20 25 /17

=== Final ===
- August 7

United States	3 – 2	Brazil	10:00; Match time: 1h57
26 /24 26 /24 21 /25 20 /25 15 /11

== Final ranking ==
1. United States
2. Brazil
3. Cuba
4. Argentina
5. Canada
6. Venezuela

2005 Men's America's Cup winners

United States
First title

== Awards ==
- Most valuable player: Dante Amaral (BRA)
- Best spiker: Riley Salmon (USA)
- Best receiver: Leonardo Patti (ARG)
- Best attacker: Dante Amaral (BRA)
- Best setter: Ricardo Garcia (BRA)
- Best blocker: Santiago Darraidou (ARG)
- Best libero: Richard Lambourne (USA)
