= 2024 Men's NORCECA Final Six =

Tournament details
- Host country: Canada
- Dates: 18–26 August 2024
- Teams: 6
- Venue: (in Gatineau host cities)

Final positions
- Champions: United States (2nd title)
- Runners-up: Canada
- Third place: Mexico

Tournament awards
- MVP: Nicholas Slight (USA)

The 2024 Men's NORCECA Final Six was the fourth edition of the annual men's volleyball tournament. Six teams participated in this edition held in Gatineau.

The United States won their second consecutive titles, after defeated Canada 3–1 in the final. Nicholas Slight of the United States won the Most Valuable Player award.

== Round robin ==
Pos	Team	Pld	W	L	Pts	SW	SL	SR	SPW	SPL	SPR	Qualification
1	Canada	5	4	1	21	13	3	4.333	401	359	1.117	Final
2	United States	5	4	1	17	12	6	2.000	428	380	1.126	Final
3	Mexico	5	3	2	17	12	7	1.714	438	408	1.074	Third place match
4	Puerto Rico	5	2	3	8	6	11	0.545	371	400	0.928	Third place match
5	Dominican Republic	5	1	4	7	5	12	0.417	379	414	0.915	
6	Cuba	5	1	4	5	3	12	0.250	319	375	0.851	

Date	Time		Score		Set 1	Set 2	Set 3	Set 4	Set 5	Total	Report
20 August	14:30	Cuba	0–3	Mexico	22–25	9–25	21–25			52–75	P2 P3
20 August	16:30	United States	3–1	Dominican Republic	28–26	22–25	25–19	25–16		100–86	P2 P3
20 August	19:00	Canada	3–0	Puerto Rico	25–19	25–21	25–19			75–59	P2 P3
21 August	14:30	United States	3–2	Mexico	26–24	23–25	19–25	25–13	15–11	108–98	P2 P3
21 August	16:30	Cuba	3–0	Puerto Rico	25–23	26–24	25–20			76–67	P2 P3
21 August	19:00	Canada	3–0	Dominican Republic	32–30	25–19	27–25			84–74	P2 P3
22 August	14:30	United States	3–0	Puerto Rico	25–15	25–21	25–23			75–59	P2 P3
22 August	16:30	Dominican Republic	0–3	Mexico	18–25	21–25	21–25			60–75	P2 P3
22 August	19:00	Canada	3–0	Cuba	25–23	25–20	25–21			75–64	P2 P3
23 August	14:30	Mexico	1–3	Puerto Rico	25–18	26–28	19–25	20–25		90–96	P2 P3
23 August	16:30	Dominican Republic	3–0	Cuba	25–20	25–23	25–22			75–65	P2 P3
23 August	19:00	Canada	3–0	United States	25–21	25–23	25–18			75–62	P2 P3
24 August	14:30	Puerto Rico	3–1	Dominican Republic	25–17	25–22	15–25	25–20		90–84	P2 P3
24 August	16:30	United States	3–0	Cuba	33–31	25–14	25–17			83–62	P2 P3
24 August	19:00	Canada	1–3	Mexico	21–25	23–25	27–25	21–25		92–100	P2 P3

== Bracket ==
Final
Canada	1
United States	3
Third place
Mexico	3
Puerto Rico	2

== Fifth place match ==
Date	Time		Score		Set 1	Set 2	Set 3	Set 4	Set 5	Total	Report
25 August	12:00	Dominican Republic	1–3	Cuba	19–25	36–34	24–26	21–25		100–110	P2 P3

== Third place match ==
Date	Time		Score		Set 1	Set 2	Set 3	Set 4	Set 5	Total	Report
25 August	14:30	Mexico	3–2	Puerto Rico	21–25	25–17	25–18	23–25	15–11	109–96	P2 P3

== Final ==
Date	Time		Score		Set 1	Set 2	Set 3	Set 4	Set 5	Total	Report
25 August	17:00	Canada	1–3	United States	19–25	25–17	20–25	22–25		86–92	P2 P3

== Final standing ==
Rank	Team
1st place, gold medalist(s)	United States
2nd place, silver medalist(s)	Canada
3rd place, bronze medalist(s)	Mexico
4	Puerto Rico
5	Cuba
6	Dominican Republic

== Individual awards ==
- Most valuable player
  - Nicholas Slight (USA)
- Best scorer
  - Jose Figueroa (DOM)
- Best setter
  - Mason Greves (CAN)
- Best Opposite
  - Jose Figueroa (DOM)
- Best spikers
  - Franky Adrian Hernandez (MEX)
  - Hector Cruz (DOM)
- Best blockers
  - Trent Cherewaty (CAN)
  - DiAeris McRaven (USA)
- Best libero
  - Dennis Del Valle (PUR)
- Best server
  - Cooper Robinson (USA)
- Best receiver
  - Mason Briggs (USA)
- Best digger
  - Hiram Bravo (MEX)
