= Phil Eatherton =

American volleyball player

Personal information
- Full name: Phillip Daniel Eatherton
- Nationality: American
- Born: January 2, 1974 (age 52); Kirkwood, Missouri, U.S
- Height: 6 ft 9 in (2.06 m)
- Education: Ball State University

Volleyball information
- Position: Middle blocker

National team
United States

Phillip Daniel Eatherton (born January 2, 1974) is an American former volleyball player. He played for the United States national team at the 2004 Summer Olympics. He also played for Ball State University.

== Career ==
=== College ===
Eatherton attended Ball State and played on the school's volleyball team from 1994 to 1997. In 1995, he helped the team finish third in the NCAA Championships and was named to the All-Midwest Intercollegiate Volleyball Association second team. In 1997, Eatherton set a Ball State record with a .443 hitting percentage. He helped the Cardinals win the MIVA championship and was named to the All-MIVA first team.

Eatherton set school records in career total blocks (575), block assists (477), and second in career hitting percentage (.422). In 2008, he was inducted into the Ball State Athletic Hall of Fame.

=== International ===
Eatherton joined the U.S. national team in 1997. He played in the 1998 World Championships, 1999 Pan American Games, and 2000 World League. At the 2004 Summer Olympics, he helped the U.S. finish fourth. Eatherton received the Sagamore of the Wabash Award from Indiana's governor in recognition of the contributions he made to the state.

Eatherton played on the U.S. teams that won a silver medal at the 2005 FIVB World Grand Champions Cup, the gold medal at the 2006 Pan American Cup, the bronze medal at the 2007 FIVB World League, and the gold medal at the 2008 FIVB World League. He was an alternate for the team at the 2008 Summer Olympics.

== Personal ==
Eatherton was born in Glencoe, Missouri, on January 2, 1974. He is 6 feet, 9 inches tall.

Eatherton has two brothers and two sisters. He once was a contestant on The Price Is Right, making it all the way to the "Showcase Showdown".
