= Héctor Cruz =

Héctor Cruz may refer to:

- Héctor Cruz (actor), in telenovelas such as Clase 406
- Héctor Cruz (baseball) (born 1953), former outfielder/third baseman in Major League Baseball
- Héctor Cruz (footballer) (born 1991), Peruvian soccer player who plays for Los Caimanes
