= Patrick Powers (volleyball) =

American volleyball player

Pat Powers

Personal information
- Nickname: "PP"
- Born: Patrick Robert Powers; February 13, 1958 (age 68); Los Angeles, California, U.S.
- Height: 6 ft 6 in (198 cm)
- Education: University of Southern California

Volleyball information
- Position: Outside hitter
- Number: 13

National team
1979–1986	United States
Medal record
Men's volleyball
Representing the United States
Olympic Games
Gold medal – first place	1984 Los Angeles	Indoor
World Championship
Gold medal – first place	1986 France	Indoor
FIVB World Cup
Gold medal – first place	1985 Japan
Goodwill Games
Silver medal – second place	1986 Moscow

Patrick Robert Powers (born February 13, 1958) is an American former volleyball player. He was a member of the United States men's national volleyball team that won the gold medal at the 1984 Summer Olympics in Los Angeles. He also won gold medals at the 1985 FIVB World Cup in Japan and the 1986 FIVB World Championship in France, and a silver medal at the 1986 Goodwill Games in Moscow.

== College ==
Powers, who prepped at Santa Monica High School, transferred to the University of Southern California after helping Santa Monica College win the 1977 state J.C. title. He lettered three years at USC (1978–80), as the Trojans won the 1980 NCAA title and were runners-up in 1979. He was a two-time All-American first teamer and NCAA All-Tournament team member (1979–80).

== Beach volleyball ==
Powers played beach volleyball from 1979 to 1996, and won 12 tournaments and $548,000 in prizes.

== Awards ==
- 1978 - Pac-Rim Championship
- 1980 - NCAA Champion
- 1984 - Olympic gold medal
- 1985 - FIVB World Cup gold medal
- 1986 - Goodwill Games silver medal
- 1986 - FIVB World Championship gold medal
- 1987 - World Beach Volleyball Championship

== See also ==
- USA Volleyball
