= Jayson Jablonsky =

American volleyball player (born 1985)

Personal information
- Nationality: American
- Born: July 23, 1985 (age 41); Orange, California, U.S.
- Height: 6 ft 6 in (1.98 m)
- Weight: 201 lb (91 kg)
- Spike: 136 in (345 cm)
- Block: 132 in (335 cm)
- Education: UC Irvine

Volleyball information
- Number: 16 (national team)

Career
Years	Teams
2004–2007; 2007; 2008; 2008–2009; 2009; 2010–2011; 2011–2012; 2012–2013; 2013; 2013–2014; 2014–2015; 2016; 2016–2017; 2017	(United States) UC Irvine (Puerto Rico) Playeros San Juan (Greece) AEK Athens (Italy) Zinella Bologna (Puerto Rico) Leones de Ponce (Greece) Olympiacos (France) Tourcoing (Slovenia) ACH Volley (Saudi Arabia) Al Ahli (France) Tours VB (China) Fujian (Greece) P.A.O.K. (Puerto Rico) Indios de Mayagüez (Bahrain) Al-Muharraq

National team
2008–2015	United States

Jayson Jablonsky (born July 23, 1985) is an American volleyball player. He is part of the United States national volleyball team.
