= 2025 Men's NORCECA Final Six =

Tournament details
- Host country: Puerto Rico
- Dates: 4–13 October 2025
- Teams: 6
- Venue: (in Ponce host cities)

Final positions
- Champions: United States (3rd title)
- Runners-up: Puerto Rico
- Third place: Dominican Republic

Tournament awards
- MVP: Patrick Rogers (USA)

The 2025 Men's NORCECA Final Six was the fifth edition of the annual men's volleyball tournament. Six teams participated in this edition held in Ponce.

The United States won their third consecutive and overall titles, after defeated Puerto Rico 3–0 in the final. Patrick Rogers of the United States won the Most Valuable Player award.

== Round robin ==
Pos	Team	Pld	W	L	Pts	SW	SL	SR	SPW	SPL	SPR	Qualification
1	Puerto Rico	5	4	1	19	14	6	2.333	455	375	1.213	Semifinals
2	United States	5	4	1	18	14	7	2.000	484	412	1.175	Semifinals
3	Mexico	5	4	1	18	13	6	2.167	439	386	1.137	Semifinals
4	Dominican Republic	5	2	3	14	10	9	1.111	425	415	1.024	Semifinals
5	Canada	5	1	4	6	4	12	0.333	320	371	0.863	
6	Suriname	5	0	5	0	0	15	0.000	211	375	0.563	

Date	Time		Score		Set 1	Set 2	Set 3	Set 4	Set 5	Total	Report
6 October	16:00	Suriname	0–3	Canada	13–25	18–25	16–25			47–75	
6 October	18:00	United States	2–3	Mexico	25–22	25–21	19–25	22–25	11–15	102–108	
6 October	20:00	Puerto Rico	3–2	Dominican Republic	25–22	25–19	19–25	26–28	15–7	110–101	
7 October	16:00	United States	3–1	Canada	25–18	25–10	23–25	25–18		98–71	
7 October	18:00	Dominican Republic	3–0	Suriname	25–4	25–17	25–11			75–32	
7 October	20:00	Puerto Rico	3–1	Mexico	25–20	18–25	25–16	25–19		93–80	
8 October	16:00	United States	3–1	Dominican Republic	22–25	30–28	25–17	25–20		102–90	
8 October	18:00	Canada	0–3	Mexico	18–25	19–25	19–25			56–75	
8 October	20:00	Puerto Rico	3–0	Suriname	25–16	25–13	25–9			75–38	
9 October	16:00	Dominican Republic	1–3	Mexico	15–25	28–26	21–25	18–25		82–101	
9 October	18:00	United States	3–0	Suriname	25–1	25–17	25–11			75–29	
9 October	20:00	Puerto Rico	3–0	Canada	25–15	25–17	25–16			75–48	
10 October	17:00	Suriname	0–3	Mexico	21–25	14–25	18–25			53–75	
10 October	19:00	Canada	0–3	Dominican Republic	23–25	24–26	23–25			70–76	
10 October	21:00	Puerto Rico	2–3	United States	25–19	23–25	18–25	25–23	11–15	102–107	

== Bracket ==
Semifinals
United States	3
Mexico	2
Puerto Rico	3
Dominican Republic	2

Final
United States	3
Puerto Rico	0
Third place
Mexico	0
Dominican Republic	3

== Semifinals ==
Date	Time		Score		Set 1	Set 2	Set 3	Set 4	Set 5	Total	Report
11 October	18:00	United States	3–2	Mexico	22–25	25–22	19–25	25–23	15–13	106–108	
11 October	20:00	Puerto Rico	3–2	Dominican Republic	25–27	32–30	31–33	25–22	15–11	128–123	

== Fifth place match ==
Date	Time		Score		Set 1	Set 2	Set 3	Set 4	Set 5	Total	Report
12 October	15:00	Canada	3–0	Suriname	25–19	25–18	25–15			75–52	

== Third place match ==
Date	Time		Score		Set 1	Set 2	Set 3	Set 4	Set 5	Total	Report
12 October	17:00	Mexico	0–3	Dominican Republic	23–25	21–25	22–25			66–75	

== Final ==
Date	Time		Score		Set 1	Set 2	Set 3	Set 4	Set 5	Total	Report
12 October	19:00	United States	3–0	Puerto Rico	27–25	25–20	25–21			77–66	

== Final standing ==
Rank	Team
1st place, gold medalist(s)	United States
2nd place, silver medalist(s)	Puerto Rico
3rd place, bronze medalist(s)	Dominican Republic
4	Mexico
5	Canada
6	Suriname

== Individual awards ==
- Most valuable player
  - Patrick Rogers (USA)
- Best scorer
  - Jose Adrian Garcia (DOM)
- Best setter
  - Howard Garcia (PUR)
- Best Opposite
  - Jose Adrian Garcia (DOM)
- Best spikers
  - Luis David Reinoso (DOM)
  - Pelegrin Vargas (PUR)
- Best blockers
  - Gyles Black (SUR)
  - Moises Ortiz (DOM)
- Best libero
  - Enger Mieses (DOM)
- Best server
  - Kyler Wade (USA)
- Best receiver
  - Arnel Cabrera (PUR)
- Best digger
  - Enger Mieses (DOM)
