= Scott Touzinsky =

American volleyball player (born 1982)

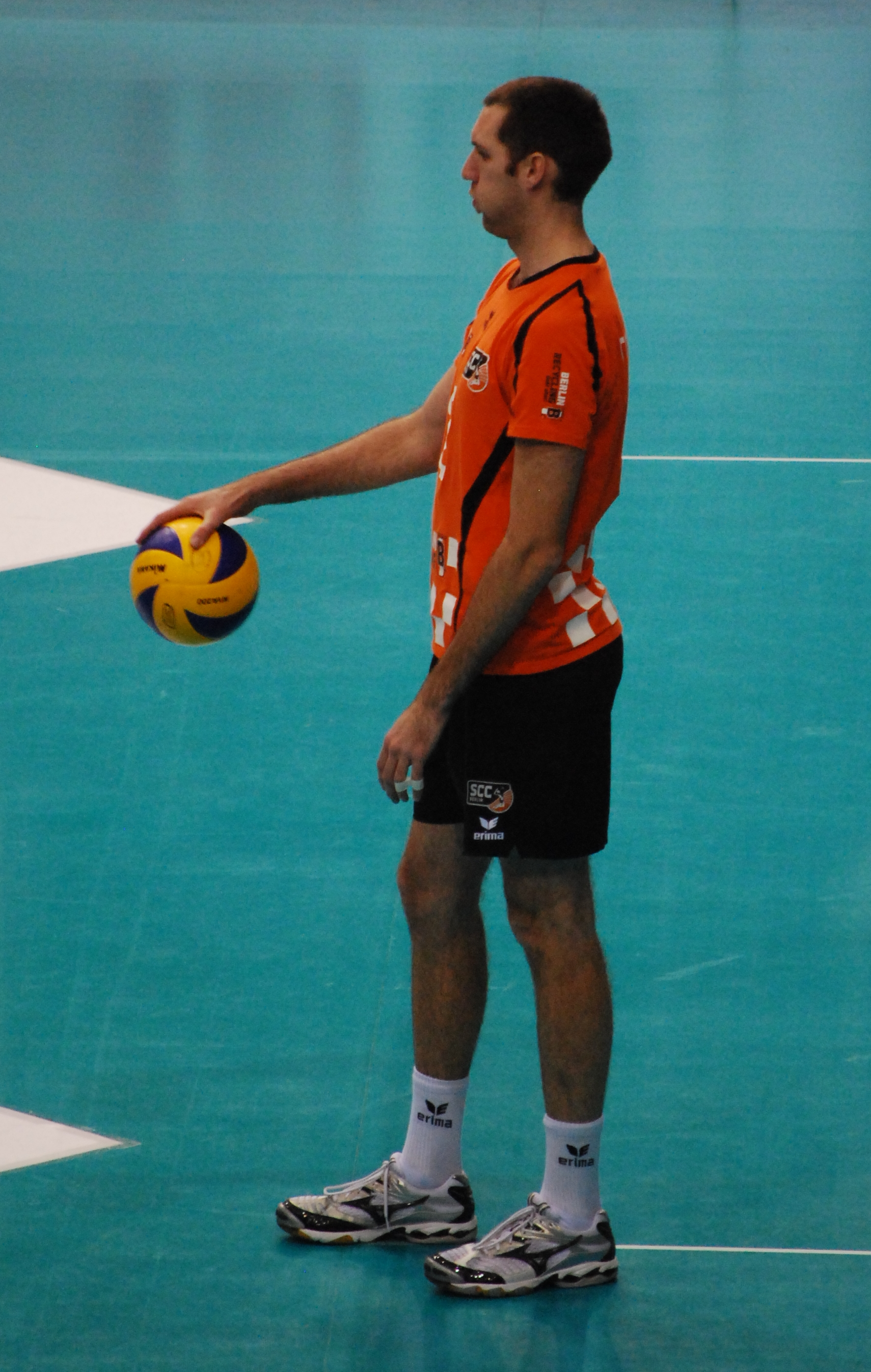

Personal information
- Full name: Scott Joseph Touzinsky
- Born: April 22, 1982 (age 44); St. Louis, Missouri, U.S.
- Height: 6 ft 6 in (1.98 m)
- Education: California State University, Long Beach

Volleyball information
- Position: Outside hitter

National team
2007-2017	United States
Medal record
Men's volleyball
Representing the United States
Olympic Games
Gold medal – first place	2008 Beijing	Team competition

Scott Joseph Touzinsky (born April 22, 1982) is an American volleyball player and coach. He was a member of the U.S. national team 2007–2018. With the national team, Touzinsky played in the 2008 Beijing Olympics and won a gold medal.

== Personal life ==
Touzinsky was born in St. Louis to Charles and Anne Touzinsky, who are of Polish origin. He attended St. John Vianney High School in Kirkwood, Missouri, where he graduated in 2000. In 2006, Touzinsky married Angelique Vogel, a promotional spokesmodel.

== College career ==
Touzinsky attended Long Beach State and finished his career as the single-season ace leader. In 2004, his senior season, he was an AVCA First Team All-American and became the all-time ace leader for Long Beach State. In January 2004, he became just the third player in NCAA Division I-II to score 40 or more kills in an all rally-scoring match when he posted 40 versus BYU. He led the 49'ers to the 2004 NCAA Men's Volleyball Championship match, where they finished as runners-up to BYU. In addition, he was the 2001 MPSF Freshman of the Year and was a Second Team All-American in 2003.

== Professional career ==
In 2004, he tore his anterior cruciate ligament and was told he might never play volleyball at a professional level again. After six months, he returned to volleyball and was playing with a professional team in Belgium. In January 2017, he announced his retirement from professional volleyball.

== College coaching ==
Touzinsky was a Long Beach State assistant coach.

=== Suspension ===
He was suspended by USA Volleyball in July 2018 because of a pending investigation by the United States Center for SafeSport. Since the NCAA does not fall under SafeSport jurisdiction, Touzinsky was not prohibited from coaching in college. The complaint against Touzinsky related to when Touzinsky was a player on the U.S. National Team. Touzinsky left the program in April 2019 after it was revealed he was sanctioned by SafeSport following an investigation into allegations of sexual misconduct.

== International competitions ==
- 2008
  - Olympic Games (gold medal)
  - FIVB World League (gold medal)
  - NORCECA Continental Olympic Qualifying Championship (gold medal)
- 2007
  - NORCECA Continental Championship (gold medal)
- 2003
  - World University Games (bronze medal)
