= 2023 Men's NORCECA Pan American Cup Final Six =

Tournament details
- Host country: Canada
- Dates: 17–25 September 2023
- Teams: 6
- Venue: (in Edmonton host cities)

Final positions
- Champions: United States (1st title)
- Runners-up: Canada
- Third place: Mexico

Tournament awards
- MVP: Patrick Gasman (USA)

The 2023 Men's NORCECA Pan American Cup Final Six was the third edition of the annual men's volleyball tournament. Six teams participated in this edition held in Edmonton.

The United States won their first title, after defeated Canada 3–0 in the final. Patrick Gasman of the United States won the Most Valuable Player award.

== Round robin ==
Pos	Team	Pld	W	L	Pts	SW	SL	SR	SPW	SPL	SPR	Qualification
1	United States	5	5	0	24	15	1	15.000	397	275	1.444	Final
2	Canada	5	3	2	15	12	9	1.333	473	454	1.042	Final
3	Mexico	5	3	2	12	10	10	1.000	449	425	1.056	Third place match
4	Cuba	5	2	3	12	9	10	0.900	401	440	0.911	Third place match
5	Puerto Rico	5	2	3	9	8	12	0.667	413	466	0.886	
6	Dominican Republic	5	0	5	3	3	15	0.200	354	427	0.829	

Date	Time		Score		Set 1	Set 2	Set 3	Set 4	Set 5	Total	Report
19 September	14:00	Cuba	2–3	Mexico	26–24	25–22	18–25	17–25	8–15	94–111	P2 P3
19 September	16:30	United States	3–0	Dominican Republic	25–17	25–9	25–19			75–45	P2 P3
19 September	19:00	Canada	3–1	Puerto Rico	25–15	25–20	23–25	25–20		98–80	P2 P3
20 September	14:00	United States	3–0	Mexico	25–19	25–17	25–19			75–55	P2 P3
20 September	16:30	Cuba	3–1	Puerto Rico	25–22	19–25	26–24	25–18		95–89	P2 P3
20 September	19:00	Canada	3–1	Dominican Republic	21–25	25–20	25–16	25–22		96–83	P2 P3
21 September	14:00	United States	3–0	Puerto Rico	25–17	25–17	25–11			75–45	P2 P3
21 September	16:30	Dominican Republic	0–3	Mexico	14–25	25–27	17–25			56–77	P2 P3
21 September	19:00	Canada	3–1	Cuba	25–22	25–20	23–25	25–16		98–83	P2 P3
22 September	14:00	Mexico	1–3	Puerto Rico	25–17	23–25	26–28	21–25		95–95	P2 P3
22 September	16:30	Dominican Republic	0–3	Cuba	22–25	23–25	22–25			67–75	P2 P3
22 September	19:00	Canada	1–3	United States	25–22	14–25	20–25	17–25		76–97	P2 P3
23 September	14:00	Puerto Rico	3–2	Dominican Republic	25–23	22–25	25–16	16–25	16–14	104–103	P2 P3
23 September	16:30	United States	3–0	Cuba	25–21	25–20	25–13			75–54	P2 P3
23 September	19:00	Canada	2–3	Mexico	20–25	26–28	25–20	25–23	9–15	105–111	P2 P3

== Bracket ==
Final
United States	3
Canada	0
Third place
Mexico	3
Cuba	0

== Fifth place match ==
Date	Time		Score		Set 1	Set 2	Set 3	Set 4	Set 5	Total	Report
24 September	11:30	Puerto Rico	3–2	Dominican Republic	19–25	15–25	25–23	25–17	16–14	100–104	P2 P3

== Third place match ==
Date	Time		Score		Set 1	Set 2	Set 3	Set 4	Set 5	Total	Report
24 September	14:00	Mexico	3–0	Cuba	26–24	25–17	25–18			76–59	P2 P3

== Final ==
Date	Time		Score		Set 1	Set 2	Set 3	Set 4	Set 5	Total	Report
24 September	16:30	United States	3–0	Canada	25–21	25–14	25–16			75–51	P2 P3

== Final standing ==
Rank	Team
1st place, gold medalist(s)	United States
2nd place, silver medalist(s)	Canada
3rd place, bronze medalist(s)	Mexico
4	Cuba
5	Puerto Rico
6	Dominican Republic

== Individual awards ==
- Most valuable player
  - Patrick Gasman (USA)
- Best scorer
  - Klistan Lawrence (PUR)
- Best setter
  - Andrew Rowan (USA)
- Best Opposite
  - Alejandro Miguel González (CUB)
- Best spikers
  - Jordan Ewart (USA)
  - Ethan Champlin (USA)
- Best blockers
  - Patrick Gasman (USA)
  - Moises Ortiz (DOM)
- Best libero
  - Joniel Albaladejo (PUR)
- Best server
  - Jordan Ewart (USA)
- Best receiver
  - Luis Ricardo (CUB)
- Best defense
  - Luis Ricardo (CUB)
