= Douglas Partie =

American volleyball player (born 1961)

Doug Partie

Personal information
- Born: Robert Douglas Partie; October 21, 1961 (age 65); Santa Barbara, California, U.S.
- Height: 198 cm (6 ft 6 in)
- Education: University of California, Los Angeles

Volleyball information
- Position: Middle blocker
- Number: 5 (1988); 15 (1992)

National team
1985–1992	United States
Medal record
Men's volleyball
Representing the United States
Olympic Games
Gold medal – first place	1988 Seoul	Team
Bronze medal – third place	1992 Barcelona	Team
World Championship
Gold medal – first place	1986 France	Team
FIVB World Cup
Gold medal – first place	1985 Japan
Bronze medal – third place	1991 Japan
Goodwill Games
Silver medal – second place	1986 Moscow
Pan American Games
Gold medal – first place	1987 Indianapolis	Team

Robert Douglas "Doug" Partie (born October 21, 1961) is an American former volleyball player who was a member of the United States men's national volleyball team that won the gold medal at the 1988 Summer Olympics in Seoul. Four years later in the 1992 Summer Olympics in Barcelona, he won the bronze medal with the national team.

Partie helped the United States win the 1985 FIVB World Cup, the 1986 FIVB World Championship, and the 1987 Pan American Games.

== College ==
Partie played volleyball at UCLA and was a three-time All-American. He helped the Bruins win four straight NCAA Championships from 1981 to 1984. He was selected to the NCAA Championship All-Tournament Team in 1982, 1983, and 1984.

Partie was inducted into the UCLA Hall of Fame in 1997.

== Awards ==
- Three-time All-American
- Four-time NCAA Champion — 1981–1984
- Three-time All-Tournament Team — 1982, 1983, 1984
- FIVB World Cup gold medal — 1985
- Goodwill Games silver medal — 1986
- FIVB World Championship gold medal — 1986
- Pan American Games gold medal — 1987
- Olympic gold medal — 1988
- FIVB World Cup bronze medal — 1991
- Olympic bronze medal — 1992
- UCLA Hall of Fame — 1997
