= Brook Billings =

American volleyball player (born 1980)

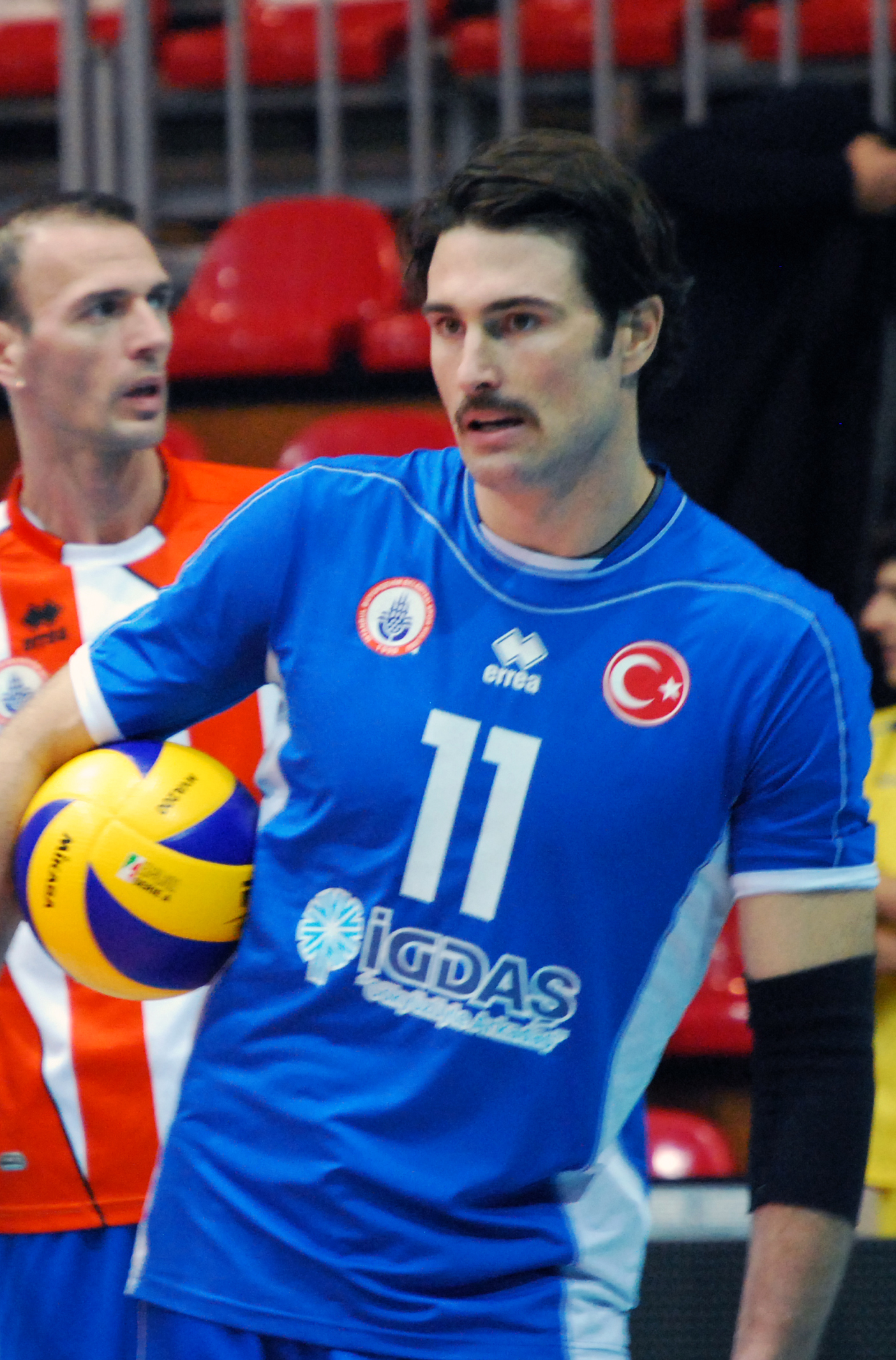

Personal information
- Nationality: American
- Born: April 30, 1980 (age 46); Santa Barbara, California, U.S.
- Height: 6 ft 5 in (1.96 m)
- Education: University of Southern California

Volleyball information
- Position: Opposite hitter
Medal record
Men's volleyball
Representing the United States
FIVB World League
Gold medal – first place	2008 Rio de Janeiro	Team
Bronze medal – third place	2007 Katowice	Team
America's Cup
Gold medal – first place	2007 Manaus	Team
Pan American Games
Silver medal – second place	2007 Rio de Janeiro	Team
NORCECA Championship
Gold medal – first place	2003 Culiacan	Team
Gold medal – first place	2005 Winnipeg	Team
Pan-American Cup
Gold medal – first place	2006 Tijuana/Mexicali	Team

Brook Michael Billings (born April 30, 1980) is an American indoor volleyball player who plays as an opposite hitter for the U.S. National Team. He joined the team in May 2002.

== College highlights ==
=== 2002 ===
Billings earned All-Mountain Pacific Sports Federation (MPSF) honorable mention. He led the team in kills (386) and in kills per game (4,39).

=== 2001 ===
Billings earned Asics/Volleyball All-American and All-MPSF honorable mentions. Led USC in kills (390) and blocks (68) and was second in digs (118). He finished eighth nationally in kill average at 4,88 (fourth in the MPSF at 5,21). He posted double-figure kills in 20 of his 22 matches, with nine matches of 20-plus kills.

=== 2000 ===
Billings earned Asics/Volleyball All-America first team, AVCA All-America second team and All-MPSF first team honors. He led the team in kills (601) while hitting 0,339. He finished third on the team in digs (160) and had 73 blocks. He ranked fifth nationally in kill average (6.84) and third in the MPSF (6.83). He posted double-figure kills in 24 of his 25 matches, with 18 matches of 20-plus kills and six matches of 30-plus kills (including an MPSF and USC season-high 50 kills at Loyola Marymount, a career best).

=== 1999 ===
Billings started all but two matches at opposite hitter as just a freshman and made an immediate impact. He garnered Asics/Volleyball National Co-Freshman of the Year and MPSF Freshman of the Year honors, as well as being an All-MPSF honorable mention selection. He led the team in kills with 640, the most ever by a USC freshman and the fourth-most by any Trojan ever, while hitting 0,317. Finished sixth nationally in kill average (6.17). He also had 169 digs (second on the team) and 92 blocks (fourth on the team). He posted double-figure kills 26 times, with 17 matches of 20-plus kills and six matches of 30-plus kills.

== International highlights ==
=== 2008 ===
Billings was an alternate for the Olympic Team. Played in two World League pool play matches in Bulgaria and scored four points. He played in the Four Nations' Tournament in Leipzig, Germany and then scored 16 points in an exhibition victory over Germany played in Chemnitz.

=== 2007 ===
Billings had a stellar run at the Pan American Games on August 23–28 in Rio de Janeiro, finishing as the United States' second-leading scorer, and fifth overall, with 61 points on 54 kills, six blocks and one ace. He led the U.S. Men in scoring in their matches against Argentina (12 points), Puerto Rico (14 points) and Cuba (16 points). He played in four World League pool play matches and scored 20 points.

=== 2006 ===
Billings was on the preliminary roster for the World Championships. He scored seven points for the U.S. Men in their opening World League match against Poland. He helped the squad win the inaugural Men's Pan-American Volleyball Cup.

=== 2005 ===
Billings earned a gold medal as Team USA won its second-straight NORCECA Continental Championship with a four-set victory over Cuba on September 15. The USA Men qualified for the FIVB World Grand Champions Cup with the win. He also earned a gold medal in August at the FIVB Volleyball Men's World Championship Qualifying Tournament as the USA Men qualified for the 2006 World Championships.

=== 2004 ===
Billings made his first-ever Olympic appearance in Athens, Greece as the USA Men finished fourth overall. Ranked sixth on the team in total points with 28 on 23 kills and five blocks. Team USA qualified for the 2004 Olympic Games in Athens, Greece by winning the NORCECA Olympic Qualifying Tournament in Caguas, Puerto Rico on January 10. The men posted a perfect record of 6-0 en route to the gold medal, which included a come-from-behind, 3-2 win over Cuba in the championship match. He scored a match-high 17 points on 16 kills and one block in a 3-1 pool-play win over Cuba after replacing starting opposite Clay Stanley.

=== 2003 ===
Billings led Team USA in scoring and ranked third among all scorers with 73 points on 67 kills, five blocks and one service ace at the Pan American Games in the Dominican Republic. The Americans finished fourth (3-2) at the Pan Am Games after losing to Brazil in the bronze medal match. He saw action in just six of 11 matches at the World Cup and played 20 of a possible 37 sets, but still scored 86 points on 73 kills and 13 blocks to finish fourth on the team in total points and tops in points per match at 14,33.

=== 2002 ===
Billings was one of the team's biggest surprises during the 2002 season. Ranked first on the team in total points (266) and total kills (223). He also ranked third in stuff blocks (30), points per set (2,83), and digs (97). He scored a career-high 26 points (24 kills, one block, one ace) in a 3-2 upset of eventual World Champion Brazil on September 30 during pool play. He also scored 21 points (19 kills, one block, one service ace) in a five-set win over Australia on June 30 and 20 points (17 kills, two blocks, one ace) in a 3-2 win over Greece on August 30.

== Major international competition ==
=== 2008 ===
- FIVB World League (gold medal).
- Four Nations' Tournament (gold medal).

=== 2007 ===
- Americas' Cup (gold medal).
- Pan American Games (silver medal).
- FIVB World League (bronze medal).

=== 2006 ===
- FIVB World League.
- Pan American Cup (gold medal).
- Argentina Tour.

=== 2005 ===
- FIVB World Championship Qualifying Tournament (gold medal).
- NORCECA Continental Championships (gold medal).

=== 2004 ===
- NORCECA Olympic Qualifying Tournament (gold medal).
- Japan Tour.
- Houston Series.
- USA Global Challenge (gold medal).
- Serbia and Montenegro Tour (silver medal).
- Olympic Games (fourth place).

=== 2003 ===
- Colorado/Nebraska Tour.
- Canada Tour.
- Pan American Games (fourth place).
- NORCECA Zone Championships (gold medal).
- World Cup (fourth place).

=== 2002 ===
- Dallas Tour.
- Six-Nation Tournament (Italy).
- Louisville Tour.
- Bulgaria Tour.
- Greece Tour.
- Florida Tour.
- World Championships.

== Professional ==
Former teams he has played professionally on:

- (Austria) Hot Volleys Vienna
- (Japan) Osaka Blazers Sakai
- (Poland) AZS Częstochowa
- (Puerto Rico) Caribes de San Sebastián
- (Turkey) Fenerbahçe Istanbul
- (United Arab Emirates) Al-Ahli Club Dubai
- (South Korea) Suwon KEPCO 45
- (Greece) Iraklis Thessaloniki

== Personal life ==
Billings' parents are David Billings and Daphne Von Essen. He also has a sister, Summer Billings and a brother, James Von Essen. He enjoys snowboarding, basketball, electronics, a little bit of golf, surfing and music concerts. One of the most defining moments in his life was being recruited and accepted to USC. Majored in public policy and management at USC. His off-court goals include getting married and having a family. He considers real estate as a possible future profession. His most prized possessions are his family and his friends. One of his fondest childhood memories is spending all day at East Beach in Santa Barbara with his friends. He would like to have seen Sublime in concert. He says "a million dollar car-with wings" is the first thing he would buy if he won the lottery. He chose "mind reading" as the superpower he wants. His pet peeve is "when people drive slow in the far left lane on the freeway." In addition to being freakishly tall, Brook is known to be a good friend, at times, and cannot finish a jigsaw puzzle to save his life.
