= Doug Beal =

American volleyball player and coach (born 1947)

Personal information
- Full name: Douglas Peter Beal
- Born: March 4, 1947 (age 79); Cleveland, Ohio, U.S.
- Hometown: Cleveland, Ohio U.S.
- Education: Bowling Green University; Ohio State University; Springfield College

Coaching information
Previous teams coached
| Years | Teams |
|---|---|
| 1971; 1972–1974; 1977–1984; 1990–1992; 1997–2005 | Bowling Green University; Ohio State University; U.S. Men's National Team; Mediolanum Gonzaga, IVL; U.S. Men's National Team |

Best results
| Years | Location | Result |
|---|---|---|
| 1984; 1991; 1992; 2004; 2004 | 1984 Olympics; FIVB Volleyball Men's Club World Championship; FIVB Volleyball Men's Club World Championship; NORCECA Olympic Qualifying Tournament; 2004 Olympics | Gold; 1st 3rd Gold; 4th |
- Last updated: June 6, 2007

Doug Beal (born March 4, 1947, in Cleveland, Ohio) is an American former volleyball player and coach, a former USA Volleyball CEO, and a member of the International Jewish Sports Hall of Fame.

== Education ==
- Master's degree in Education from Bowling Green University,
- Doctorate degree in Exercise physiology from Ohio State University
- Doctorate in Humanics from Springfield College

== Contributions to the sport of volleyball ==
=== As a player ===
Beal competed on two World Championships teams, and four NORCECA Zone championship teams. The USA National Men's teams did not qualify for the 1972, 1976 or 1980 Olympics. Beal was a five-time All-America player at Ohio State University Buckeyes. In 1969 he was voted Most Valuable Player (MVP) of the Midwestern Intercollegiate Volleyball Association. He was also selected MVP of the 1975 USVBA Open Championships. He played on the U.S. Men's National Team from 1970 to 1976.

=== As a coach ===
==== United States National Team ====
Beal was named head coach of the U.S. Men's National Team in 1977 and became the driving force for establishing a full-time, year-around volleyball training center. The facility was created in Dayton, Ohio, in 1978. The center moved to San Diego, California in 1981 along with the national team program.

With Beal as head coach of the national team, the United States captured its first-ever gold medal in men's volleyball at the 1984 Olympics. Although he stepped down as head coach following his team's 1984 gold medal run, Beal's pioneering offensive and defensive systems continued to impact the U.S. volleyball program, yielding gold medals at the 1985 Volleyball World Cup, the 1986 FIVB Volleyball Men's World Championships, and the 1988 Olympic Games in Seoul. After his resignation, Beal became the organization's National Team Center Director from 1985 to 1987. He remained involved with the organization until 1990 when he moved to Italy to coach a top professional team.

Beal returned to the men's national team in July, 1993 as a special assistant to the Executive Director/CEO. He worked closely with former USAV Executive Director John Carroll, and was responsible for FIVB relations and player development for the USA national teams. He worked in that capacity until he accepted the program's head coaching position for the second time in 1997.

During his second leg as head coach of the national team, he guided the team at the 2000 Olympics in Sydney, Australia. He became the second coach in USA Volleyball history to guide three teams to the Olympics when Team USA qualified for the 2004 Summer Games by winning the NORCECA Olympic Qualifying Tournament in Puerto Rico with a perfect 6-0 record. In the 2004 Summer Games, he guided his squad to a 4-4 record and to a fourth-place finish overall at the 2004 Olympics in Athens, Greece

==== Professional ====
Beal served a two-year stint from 1990 to 1992 as head coach of the Italian Professional League's Mediolanum Gonzaga team in Milan, Italy. MG won the FIVB Volleyball Men's Club World Championship in 1991 and finished third in 1992.

==== College ====
- Bowling Green State University Head coach 1971
- Ohio State University Head coach 1972-1974,

=== As an administrator ===
In 1993, Beal was named executive director of the National Volleyball League, the first professional league organized and operated under the auspices of U.S. Volleyball.

In January 2005, Beal was named Chief Executive Officer of USA Volleyball, the governing body of Volleyball in the United States. In February 2016, Beal announced his retirement as the CEO of the USA volleyball, after serving 11 years in his post. He will retire on January 2, 2017.

== Awards and accolades ==
Doug Beal was inducted into the Volleyball Hall of Fame in 1989 and was USA Volleyball's first recipient of the All-Time Great Coach Award in 1995. He was named a finalist for the Federation Internationale de Volleyball (FIVB) Greatest Coach of the Century. Beal was also recently selected to the USA Volleyball 75th Anniversary All-Era Team as a coach during the Men's 1978-2003 era. He was also inducted into the International Jewish Sports Hall of Fame in 2000.

Other honors include induction to the Ohio State University and Cleveland Halls of Fame.

== Bibliography ==
Beal has written and lectured profusely on the subject of volleyball. His books include:

- Spike, Publisher: Slawson Communications Incorporated 1985 ISBN 0932238300

Beal also contributed on the following:

- Volleyball Coaching Bible (Part 2, Chapter 4: Seeking Excellence in a Program-Going for the Gold) ISBN 0736039678
- Volleyball: The Keys to Excellence, Volleyball Coaching Tips for the 90's, Publisher: Sports Support Syndicate; 2nd edition (February 1991) ISBN 1878602365

== See also ==
- List of notable Jewish volleyball players
