= Richard Lambourne =

American indoor volleyball player

Rich Lambourne
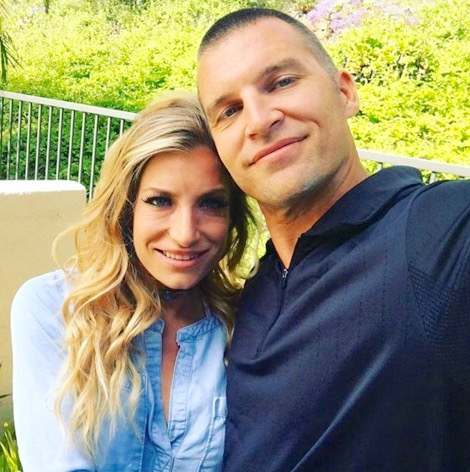

Personal information
- Full name: Richard Edward Lambourne
- Nationality: American
- Born: May 6, 1975 (age 51); Louisville, Kentucky, U.S.
- Height: 6 ft 4 in (1.93 m)
- Spike: 128 in (324 cm)
- Block: 123 in (312 cm)

Volleyball information
- Position: Libero
- Number: 5

National team
| United States |
Medal record
Men's volleyball
Representing the United States
Olympic Games
| Gold medal – first place | 2008 Beijing | Team competition |
Pan American Games
| Silver medal – second place | 2007 Rio de Janeiro | Team competition |
NORCECA Championship
| Gold medal – first place | 2005 Winnipeg | Team competition |
| Silver medal – second place | 2005 Bridgetown | Team competition |

Richard Edward "Rich" Lambourne (born May 6, 1975) is an American indoor volleyball player. He joined the U.S. men's national team in 2000 as the designated libero. He has recently played for Delecta Bydgoszcz. Lambourne made his Olympic debut at the 2008 Olympics, helping Team USA to a gold medal.

== High school and personal life ==
Lambourne was born in Louisville, Kentucky, to Paul and Ann Lambourne. He grew up in Tustin, California, and attended Foothill High School.

Lambourne was badly injured during a bike accident when he was 6. He skinned his shoulder to the bone and mangled the right side of his face. He says of the accident, "I could have been much uglier but due to my loving parents and medical science, I am only mostly unattractive."

He served a mission in Hokkaido, Japan, for the Church of Jesus Christ of Latter-day Saints.

== College ==
Lambourne attended Brigham Young University where he majored in Japanese. He was also recruited by Stanford and Long Beach State.

In 1999, he was the starting outside hitter for the BYU men's volleyball team that won the program's first ever NCAA men's volleyball championship. For the year, he played in 82 games and posted 252 kills, 205 digs, 88 blocks and a .348 hitting percentage.

== Career ==
Lambourne began to play professional volleyball for Lamia, a club from Greece. His next club was Aon hotVolleys Vienna. After that, he went to Noliko Maaseik, then to Polish Mlekpol AZS Olsztyn, then to the Russian Lokomotiv-Belogorie. He represented Polish Delecta Bydgoszcz. As of February 24, 2010 he has been disciplinary released.

== Clubs ==
- AUT Aon hotVolleys Vienna (2001–2003)
- NED Piet Zoomers Apeldoorn (2003–2004)
- GRC Lamia (2004–2005)
- BEL Noliko Maaseik (2005–2006)
- POL AZS Olsztyn (2006–2008)
- RUS Lokomotiv-Belogorie (2008–2009)
- POL Delecta Bydgoszcz (2009–2010)
- POL Fart Kielce (2011–2012)
- Qatar Al Arabi S.C. (2012–2013)

== International competitions ==
Recent international competition

- 2008
  - Olympic Games (gold medal)
  - FIVB World League (gold medal)
  - NORCECA Continental Olympic Qualifying Championship (gold medal)
- 2007
  - FIVB World Cup
  - NORCECA Continental Championship (gold medal)
  - America's Cup (gold medal)
  - FIVB World League (bronze medal)
- 2005
  - NORCECA Continental Championships (gold medal)
  - World Grand Champions Cup (silver medal)

== Individual awards ==
- 2006 Pan-American Cup "Best Defender"
- 2007 FIVB World League "Best Libero"
- 2008 FIVB World League "Best Libero"
