= Steve Timmons =

American former volleyball player (born 1958)

Personal information
- Nickname: Red
- Born: Steve Dennis Timmons; November 29, 1958 (age 67); Newport Beach, California, U.S.
- Height: 6 ft 5 in (1.96 m)
- Education: University of Southern California

Volleyball information
- Position: Outside hitter / Middle blocker
- Number: 6

National team
1983–1989, 1991–1992	United States
Medal record
Men's volleyball
Representing the United States
Olympic Games
Gold medal – first place	1984 Los Angeles	Indoor
Gold medal – first place	1988 Seoul	Indoor
Bronze medal – third place	1992 Barcelona	Indoor
World Championship
Gold medal – first place	1986 France	Indoor
FIVB World Cup
Gold medal – first place	1985 Japan
Bronze medal – third place	1991 Japan
Goodwill Games
Silver medal – second place	1986 Moscow
Pan American Games
Gold medal – first place	1987 Indianapolis	Indoor

Steve Dennis Timmons (born November 29, 1958) is an American former volleyball player who represented the United States at three consecutive Summer Olympics, winning a gold medal in 1984 and 1988, and a bronze medal in 1992. He was named the MVP of the 1984 Olympics by the International Volleyball Federation. He was a pioneer of back row hitting.

Timmons was teammates with Karch Kiraly on the national team at the 1985 FIVB World Cup, the 1986 FIVB World Championship, and the 1987 Pan American Games, winning gold medals in each of these events.

Timmons was inducted into the International Volleyball Hall of Fame in 1998.

== High school ==
Timmons played volleyball and basketball at Newport Harbor High School in Newport Beach, California. He started to play volleyball in his junior year.

== College ==
Timmons attended Orange Coast College (OCC), playing for the Pirates basketball team that won the California Community College Athletic Association (CCCAA) state championship, and the Pirates volleyball team that was runner-up in the state championship.

Timmons then attended the University of Southern California, playing for the Trojans volleyball team that won the 1980 NCAA men's volleyball tournament, and was selected to the All-Tournament Team. He was selected as an All-American in 1980 and 1981.

== Italian Volleyball League ==
Timmons played with Kiraly in the Italian league team Porto Ravenna Volley, known then as "il Messaggero", where they won the Italian Volleyball League division title in 1991 and the CEV Champions League title in 1992.

== Beach volleyball ==
Timmons played professional beach volleyball from 1989 to 1994. He won a tournament in Enoshima, Japan with Kiraly as his partner in 1989.

== Personal life ==
Timmons co-founded and is the former president of Redsand, an action sports clothing and lifestyle brand that he sold to Perry Ellis in 2003.

Timmons was married to basketball executive Jeanie Buss, daughter of Jerry Buss, from 1990 to 1993. From 1997 to 2018, he was married to actress Debbe Dunning (Heidi on Home Improvement), and they have three children together.

== See also ==
- USA Volleyball
