= 2015–16 CEV Challenge Cup =

- League: CEV Challenge Cup
- Sport: Volleyball
- Duration: 24 October 2015 – 3 April 2016

Finals
- Champions: (Italy) Calzedonia Verona
- Runners-up: (Russia) Fakel Novy Urengoy
- Finals MVP: (United States) Taylor Sander (VER)

CEV Challenge Cup seasons
- ← 2014–15 2016–17 →

The 2015–16 CEV Challenge Cup was the 36th edition of the CEV Challenge Cup tournament, the former CEV Cup.

This edition of the CEV Challenge Cup was historic one since a team from Kosovo was invited for the first time to take part in a CEV competition - the Kosovo's champions Drenica R&Rukolli Skenderaj. Italian club Calzedonia Verona beat Russian Fakel Novy Urengoy in the finale. American outside hitter Taylor Sander received individual award for the Most Valuable Player of the tournament.

== Participating teams ==
The number of participants on the basis of ranking list for European Cup Competitions:

| Rank | Country | Number of teams | Teams |
|---|---|---|---|
| 1 | Russia | 1 | Fakel Novy Urengoy |
| 2 | Italy | 1 | Calzedonia Verona |
| 4 | Turkey | 1 | İstanbul BB |
| 5 | Belgium | 1 | Prefaxis Menen |
| 8 | Romania | 1 | C.S. Arcada Galati |
| 9 | Greece | 1 | Ethnikos Alexandroupolis |
| 11 | Austria | 2 | Union Raiffeisen Waldviertel, VCA Amstetten NÖ |
| 12 | Slovenia | 2 | Calcit Volleyball, Panvita Pomgrad |
| 13 | Serbia | 2 | OK Novi Pazar, Spartak Ljig |
| 15 | Switzerland | 2 | Biogas Volley Näfels, Volley Amriswil |
| 19 | Finland | 1 | Raision Loimu |
| 20 | Netherlands | 1 | Orion Doetinchem |
| 22 | Israel | 1 | Hapoel Kfar Saba |
| 23 | Belarus | 1 | Bate-Bgu Borisov |
| 24 | Croatia | 2 | Mladost Zagreb, Mladost Marina Kastela |
| 25 | Cyprus | 2 | Anorthosis Famagusta, Pokka AE Karava |
| 26 | Bosnia and Herzegovina | 1 | Mladost Brcko |
| 27 | Slovakia | 1 | Spartak Myjava |
| 28 | Portugal | 2 | S.L. Benfica, Fonte Bastardo Açores |
| 30 | Norway | 2 | BK Tromsø, Nyborg Bergen |
| 31 | Albania | 1 | Studenti Tirana |
| 32 | Hungary | 1 | Fino Kaposvar |
| 33 | Denmark | 1 | Gentofte Volley |
| 35 | Northern Ireland | 1 | Ballymoney Blaze |
| - | Kosovo | 1 | Drenica R&Rukolli Skenderaj |

== Qualification phase ==
=== 1st round ===
- 1st leg 24 October 2015
- 2nd leg 25 October 2015

| Team 1 | Agg. | Team 2 | 1st leg | 2nd leg |
|---|---|---|---|---|
| Ballymoney Blaze (Northern Ireland) | 0–6 | (Kosovo) Drenica R&Rukolli Skenderaj | 0–3 | 0–3 |

=== 2nd round ===
- 1st leg 4–21 November 2016
- 2nd leg 17–22 November 2016

| Team 1 | Agg. | Team 2 | 1st leg | 2nd leg |
|---|---|---|---|---|
| Pokka AE Karava (Cyprus) | 1–6 | (Hungary) Fino Kaposvar | 1–3 | 0–3 |
| Anorthosis Famagusta (Cyprus) | 1–6 | (Belarus) Legion Obuhovo | 1–3 | 0–3 |
| Førde VBK (Norway) | 1–6 | (Portugal) Fonte Bastardo Açores | 1–3 | 0–3 |
| Spartak Myjava (Slovakia) | 1–6 | (Slovenia) Calcit Volleyball | 1–3 | 0–3 |
| C.S. Arcada Galati (Romania) | 6–3 | (Serbia) OK Novi Pazar | 3–1 | 3–2 |
| Nyborg Bergen (Norway) | 1–6 | (Finland) Loimu Raisio | 0–3 | 1–3 |
| Mladost Marina Kastela (Croatia) | 3–6 | (Belarus) Bate-Bgu Borisov | 2–3 | 1–3 |
| Orion Doetinchem (Netherlands) | 2–6 | (Russia) Fakel Novy Urengoy | 1–3 | 1–3 |
| Mladost Brcko (Bosnia and Herzegovina) | 1–6 | (Turkey) Istanbul BBSK | 1–3 | 0–3 |
| Biogas Volley Näfels (Switzerland) | 1–6 | (Portugal) S.L. Benfica | 0–3 | 1–3 |
| Studenti Tirana (Albania) | 0–6 | (Serbia) Spartak Ljig | 0–3 | 0–3 |
| Panvita Pomgrad (Slovenia) | 3–6 | (Greece) Ethnikos Alexandroupolis | 2–3 | 1–3 |
| VCA Amstetten NÖ (Austria) | 5–4 | (Croatia) Mladost Zagreb | 3–1 | 2–3 |
| Drenica R&Rukolli Skenderaj (Kosovo) | 0–6 | (Israel) Hapoel Kfar Saba | 0–3 | 0–3 |
| BK Tromsø (Norway) | 1–6 | (Denmark) Gentofte Volley | 0–3 | 1–3 |
| Calzedonia Verona (Italy) | 6–1 | (Austria) Union Raiffeisen Waldviertel | 3–0 | 3–1 |

== Main phase ==
In this phase, the 16 teams eliminated from 2015–16 Men's CEV Cup Round of 32 joined the 16 teams from qualification.

=== 16th finals ===
- 1st leg 1–15 December 2016
- 2nd leg 15–17 December 2016

| Team 1 | Agg. | Team 2 | 1st leg | 2nd leg | Golden Set |
|---|---|---|---|---|---|
| Fakel Novy Urengoy (Russia) | 6–1 | (Netherlands) Lycurgus Groningen | 3–1 | 3–0 | |
| Fatra Zlín (Czech Republic) | 6–3 | (Cyprus) Pokka AE Karava | 3–2 | 3–1 | |
| Lokomotyv Kharkiv (Ukraine) | 6–1 | (Switzerland) Volley Amriswil | 3–1 | 3–0 | |
| Calcit Kamnik (Slovenia) | 4–3 | (Netherlands) Draisma Dynamo Apeldoorn | 3–0 | 1–3 | 15–9 |
| C.S. Arcada Galati (Romania) | 5–4 | (Czech Republic) ČEZ Karlovarsko | 3–1 | 2–3 | |
| ASUL Lyon Volley-Ball (France) | 6–1 | (Finland) Loimu Raisio | 3–0 | 3–1 | |
| Fino Kaposvar (Hungary) | 3–4 | (Estonia) Pärnu VK | 3–1 | 0–3 | 7–15 |
| Prefaxis Menen (Belgium) | 5–4 | (Finland) Hurrikaani Loimaa | 3–1 | 2–3 | |
| İstanbul BB (Turkey) | 4–4 | (Belarus) Stroitel Minsk | 3–1 | 1–3 | 15–10 |
| S.L. Benfica (Portugal) | 5–4 | (Belgium) Topvolley Antwerpen | 3–1 | 2–3 | |
| Spartak Ljig (Serbia) | 6–0 | (Poland) Jastrzębski Węgiel | withdrew | withdrew | |
| Ethnikos Alexandroupolis (Greece) | 4–4 | (Slovakia) VK Prievidza | 3–1 | 1–3 | 15–11 |
| VCA Amstetten NÖ (Austria) | 1–6 | (France) Arago de Sète | 0–3 | 1–3 | |
| Hapoel Kfar Saba (Israel) | 3–6 | (Serbia) Crvena Zvezda Beograd | 1–3 | 2–3 | |
| Gentofte Volley (Denmark) | 0–6 | (Turkey) Galatasaray HDI Istanbul | 0–3 | 0–3 | |
| Landstede Zwolle (Netherlands) | 0–6 | (Italy) Calzedonia Verona | 0–3 | 0–3 | |

Notes

1. Jastrzębski Węgiel withdrew from the competition.

=== 8th finals ===
- 1st leg 19–21 January 2016
- 2nd leg 26–28 January 2016

| Team 1 | Agg. | Team 2 | 1st leg | 2nd leg | Golden Set |
|---|---|---|---|---|---|
| Fatra Zlín (Czech Republic) | 1–6 | (Russia) Fakel Novy Urengoy | 0–3 | 1–3 | |
| Lokomotyv Kharkiv (Ukraine) | 3–4 | (Slovenia) Calcit Kamnik | 3–1 | 0–3 | 17–15 |
| C.S. Arcada Galati (Romania) | 3–3 | (France) ASUL Lyon Volley-Ball | 3–0 | 0–3 | 10–15 |
| Pärnu VK (Estonia) | 3–4 | (Belgium) Prefaxis Menen | 3–1 | 0–3 | 10–15 |
| Istanbul BBSK (Turkey) | 3–4 | (Portugal) S.L. Benfica | 3–1 | 0–3 | 13–15 |
| Spartak Ljig (Serbia) | 2–6 | (Greece) Ethnikos Alexandroupolis | 2–3 | 0–3 | |
| Arago de Sète (France) | 3–3 | (Serbia) Crvena Zvezda Beograd | 3–0 | 0–3 | 15–9 |
| Calzedonia Verona (Italy) | 6–2 | (Turkey) Galatasaray HDI Istanbul | 3–1 | 3–1 | |

=== 4th finals ===
- 1st leg 16–17 February 2016
- 2nd leg 18 February – 2 March 2016

| Team 1 | Agg. | Team 2 | 1st leg | 2nd leg |
|---|---|---|---|---|
| Lokomotyv Kharkiv (Ukraine) | 0–6 | (Russia) Fakel Novy Urengoy | 0–3 | 0–3 |
| ASUL Lyon Volley-Ball (France) | 0–6 | (Belgium) Prefaxis Menen | 0–3 | 0–3 |
| S.L. Benfica (Portugal) | 6–3 | (Greece) Ethnikos Alexandroupolis | 3–1 | 3–2 |
| Calzedonia Verona (Italy) | 6–4 | (France) Arago de Sète | 3–2 | 3–2 |

== Final phase ==
=== Semi-finals ===
| Team 1 | Agg. | Team 2 | 1st leg | 2nd leg |
|---|---|---|---|---|
| Fakel Novy Urengoy (Russia) | 6–2 | (Belgium) Prefaxis Menen | 3–0 | 3–2 |
| Calzedonia Verona (Italy) | 5–4 | (Portugal) S.L. Benfica | 2–3 | 3–1 |

==== First leg ====
| Date | Time | | Score | | Set 1 | Set 2 | Set 3 | Set 4 | Set 5 | Total | Report |
|---|---|---|---|---|---|---|---|---|---|---|---|
| 16 Mar | 19:00 | Fakel Novy Urengoy (Russia) | 3–0 | (Belgium) Prefaxis Menen | 25–19 | 25–14 | 25–18 | | | 75–51 | Report |
| 16 Mar | 20:30 | Calzedonia Verona (Italy) | 2–3 | (Portugal) S.L. Benfica | 25–18 | 24–26 | 16–25 | 25–21 | 12–15 | 102–105 | Report |

==== Second leg ====
| Date | Time | | Score | | Set 1 | Set 2 | Set 3 | Set 4 | Set 5 | Total | Report |
|---|---|---|---|---|---|---|---|---|---|---|---|
| 20 Mar | 15:30 | Prefaxis Menen (Belgium) | 2–3 | (Russia) Fakel Novy Urengoy | 20–25 | 23–25 | 25–23 | 25–21 | 5–15 | 98–109 | Report |
| 20 Mar | 15:00 | S.L. Benfica (Portugal) | 1–3 | (Italy) Calzedonia Verona | 15–25 | 25–19 | 17–25 | 14–25 | | 71–94 | Report |

=== Final ===
==== First leg ====
| Date | Time | | Score | | Set 1 | Set 2 | Set 3 | Set 4 | Set 5 | Total | Report |
|---|---|---|---|---|---|---|---|---|---|---|---|
| 30 Mar | 20:30 | Calzedonia Verona (Italy) | 3–2 | (Russia) Fakel Novy Urengoy | 25–18 | 27–25 | 18–25 | 23–25 | 15–13 | 108–106 | Report |

==== Second leg ====
| Date | Time | | Score | | Set 1 | Set 2 | Set 3 | Set 4 | Set 5 | Total | Report |
|---|---|---|---|---|---|---|---|---|---|---|---|
| 3 Apr | 18:00 | Fakel Novy Urengoy (Russia) | 2–3 | (Italy) Calzedonia Verona | 20–25 | 25–18 | 20–25 | 25–21 | 6–15 | 96–104 | Report |

== Final standing ==
| Rank | Team |
|---|---|
| 1st place, gold medalist(s) | (Italy) Calzedonia Verona |
| 2nd place, silver medalist(s) | (Russia) Fakel Novy Urengoy |
| Semifinalists | (Belgium) Prefaxis Menen |
| Semifinalists | (Portugal) S.L. Benfica |

2016 Men's CEV Challenge Cup winner
(Italy)
Calzedonia Verona
1st title

Aidan Zingel, Uroš Kovačević, Nicola Pesaresi, Carmelo Gitto, François Lecat, Luca Spirito, Michele Baranowicz, Saša Starović, Giacomo Bellei, Taylor Sander, Simone Anzani, Bartosz Bućko
Head coach
Andrea Giani
