= Daniele Sottile =

Italian volleyball player (born 1979)

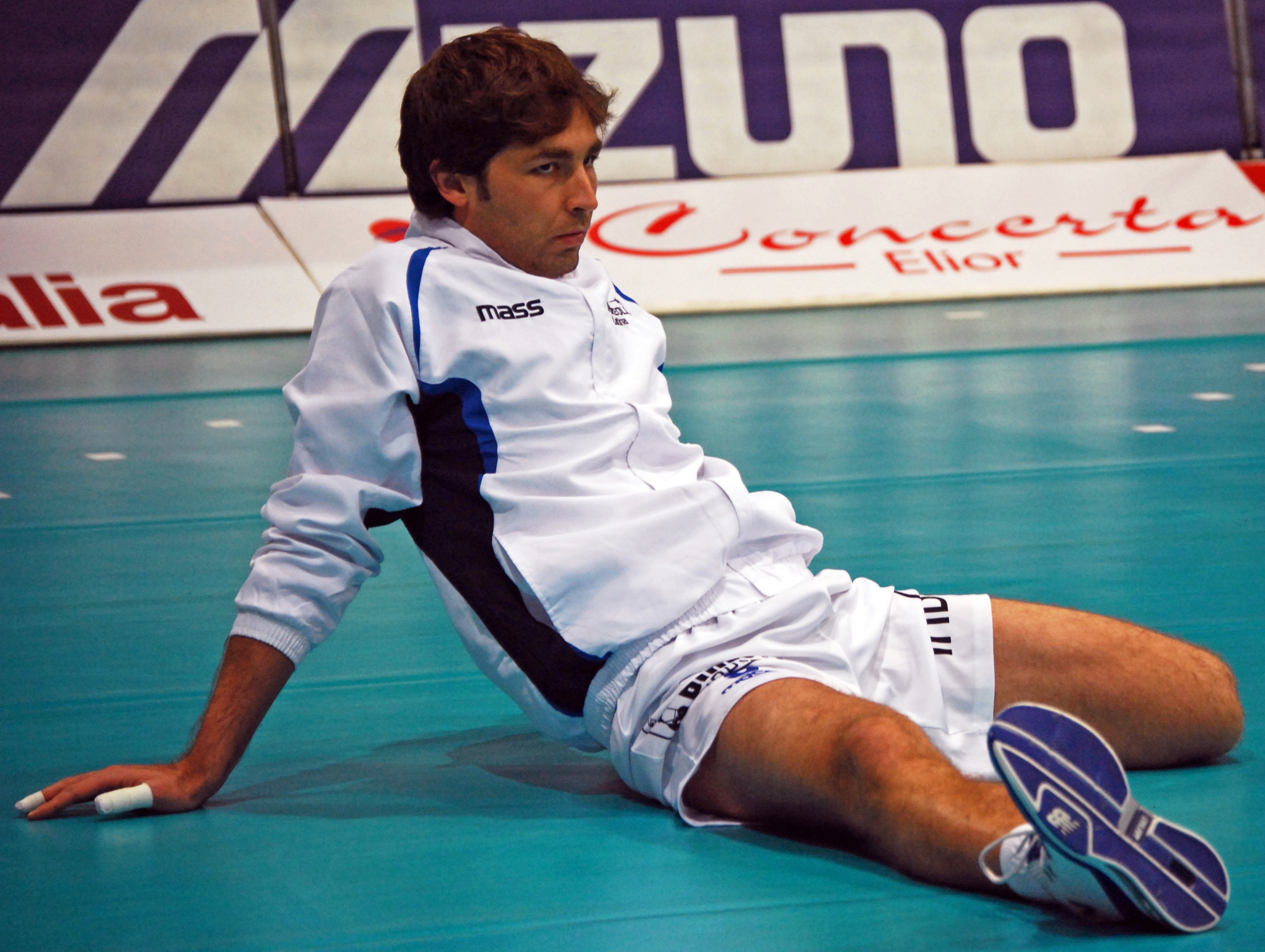

Personal information
- Born: 17 August 1979 (age 47); Milazzo, Italy
- Height: 1.86 m (6 ft 1 in)
- Weight: 73 kg (161 lb)
- Spike: 332 cm (131 in)
- Block: 310 cm (120 in)

Volleyball information
- Position: Setter
- Current club: Top Volley Latina
- Number: 5

Career
Years	Teams
1996–2000; 2000–2001; 2001–2002; 2002–2004; 2004–2006; 2006–2007; 2007–2010; 2010–2015; 2015; 2015–	Piemonte Volley; CUS Torino Pallavolo; Pallavolo Gabeca; Piemonte Volley; Callipo Valentia; Umbria Volley; BluVolley Verona; Andreoli Latina; Power Volley Milano; Top Volley Latina

National team
2011–	Italy
Honours
Men's volleyball
Representing Italy
Olympic Games
Olympic Games
Silver medal – second place	2016 Rio de Janeiro	Team
World Cup
Silver medal – second place	2015 Japan
European Championship
Bronze medal – third place	2015 Bulgaria/Italy
- Last updated: 10 February 2017

Daniele Sottile (born 17 August 1979) is an Italian professional volleyball player and member of the Italy men's national volleyball team and Italian club Top Volley Latina. He is a silver medalist of the 2015 World Cup and bronze medalist of the 2015 European Championship.

== Sporting achievements ==
=== Clubs ===
==== CEV Cup ====
- 1996/1997 – with Piemonte Volley
- 1997/1998 – with Piemonte Volley
- 1998/1999 – with Piemonte Volley
- 1999/2000 – with Piemonte Volley
- 2012/2013 – with Andreoli Latina

==== CEV Challenge Cup ====
- 2014/2015 – with Top Volley Latina

==== FIVB Club World Championship ====
- Brazil 2021 – with Cucine Lube Civitanova

==== National championships ====
- 1996/1997 Italian SuperCup, with Piemonte Volley
- 1998/1999 Italian Cup, with Piemonte Volley
- 1999/2000 Italian SuperCup, with Piemonte Volley
- 2002/2003 Italian SuperCup, with Piemonte Volley
- 2022/2023 Italian Championship, with Cucine Lube Civitanova

=== National team ===
- 1997 FIVB U19 World Championship
- 2015 CEV European Championship
- 2015 FIVB World Cup
- 2016 Olympic Games
