= Bellei =

Bellei is an Italian surname. Notable people with the surname include:

- Aldo Mario Bellei, Italian-American defendant in Rogers v. Bellei
- Gaetano Bellei (1857–1922), Italian painter
- Giacomo Bellei (born 1988), Italian volleyball player
- Mino Bellei (1936–2022), Italian actor
