= Timeline of Lomé =

The following is a timeline of the history of the city of Lomé, Togo.

== Prior to 20th century ==
- 1874 - Lomé founded "by African, British and German traders."
- 1897 - Lomé becomes capital of German colonial Togoland.

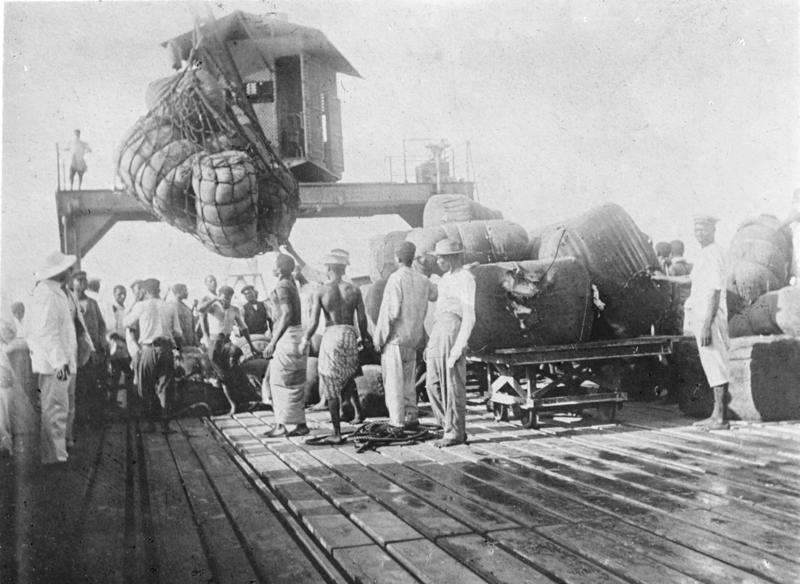
Loading of cotton (1885)

== 20th century ==
- 1902 - Catholic Cathedral built.
- 1904 - Wharf constructed.
- 1905
  - Aného-Lomé railway and Palace of the Governors built.
- 1907
  - Kpalimé-Lomé railway and Protestant church built.
- 1911 - Atakpamé-Lomé railway built.
- 1914 - Lomé "annexed by the British from the Gold Coast."
- 1915 - First Orange Lodge established in Togo, named "Defenders of Lomé".
- 1920 - Lomé becomes capital of colonial French Togoland.
- 1920s - Boulevard Circulaire laid out.
- 1922 - Political "council of notables" formed.
- 1932
  - Municipality established.
  - Étoile Filante du Togo football club formed.
- 1933 - January: "Riot by women" against taxes.
- 1955
  - Lonato building constructed.
  - Catholic Metropolitan Archdiocese of Lomé established.
- 1957 - La Vérité Togolaise newspaper begins publication.
- 1958 - Tokoin becomes part of Lome.
- 1960 - City becomes part of independent Togo.
- 1961 - Dynamic Togolais football club formed.
- 1962
  - Togo-Presse government newspaper begins publication.
  - Population: 80,000.
- 1963 - 13 January: 1963 Togolese coup d'état; Sylvanus Olympio assassinated.
- 1965 - Happy Star Concert Band formed.
- 1968 - Stade Général Eyadema (stadium) opens.
- 1969 - Deep-water harbor built.
- 1970
  - University of Benin founded.
  - Population: 148,156.
- 1975
  - Togo National Museum opens.
  - City hosts signing of the Lomé Convention.
- 1980 - Hotel du 2 Fevrier and West African Development Bank built.
- 1981 - Population: 375,499.
- 1983
  - British School established.
  - The Grand Orange Lodge of Togo is officially established.
- 1985
  - Ecobank headquartered in city.
  - Bombings.
- 1989
  - "Industrial and harbour free zone" established.
  - Dove of Peace statue unveiled in Tokoin.
- 1990 - 5 October: Anti-government demonstrations begin.
- 1991 - April: Crackdown on anti-government demonstrators.
- 1993 - La Dépêche newspaper begins publication.
- 1997
  - Nouvel Echo newspaper begins publication.
  - Al-Furkan Center built.
- 1998 - Bourse Régionale des Valeurs Mobilières (stock exchange) branch established.
- 1999 - July: City hosts signing of the Lomé Peace Accord.
- 2000 - Stade de Kégué (stadium) opens.

== 21st century ==
- 2001 - October: Mayor Amousouvi Akakpo arrested.
- 2005
  - March: Funeral of Gnassingbé Eyadéma.
  - May: Post-election unrest.
- 2007 - Musée international du Golfe de Guinée (museum) founded.
- 2011 - Population: 1,524,000 (urban agglomeration).
- 2012
  - June: Political demonstration.
  - University of Science and Technology of Togo established.
- 2013 - 11 January: Lomé Grand Market fire.
- 2015 - Population: 1,788,600 (estimate, urban agglomeration).

== See also ==
- History of Lomé (in French)
- History of Togo

== Bibliography ==
=== in English ===
- Paul Tiyambe Zeleza; Dickson Eyoh, eds. (2003). "Lome, Togo". Encyclopedia of Twentieth-Century African History. Routledge. ISBN 978-0415234795.
- N. Adovi Goeh-Akue (2005). "Lomé". In Kevin Shillington (ed.). Encyclopedia of African History. Fitzroy Dearborn. ISBN 978-1-135-45670-2.
- Hugues Steve Ndinga-Koumba Binza (2006). "Demographic Profiles of Libreville and Lomé". In S.B. Bekker and Anne Leildé (ed.). Reflections on Identity in Four African Cities. South Africa: African Minds. ISBN 978-1-920051-40-2. (about Cape Town, Johannesburg, Libreville, Lomé)
- Philippe Gervais-Lambony (2011), "Lomé", in Simon Bekker and Goran Therborn (ed.), Capital Cities in Africa: Power and Powerlessness, Dakar: Council for the Development of Social Science Research in Africa, ISBN 978-2-8697-8495-6

=== in French ===
- Gabriel Kwami Nyassogbo (1993). "Comment une capitale devient macrocephale en Afrique subsaharienne: le cas de Lome au Togo". In John Taylor; et al. (eds.). Les capitales: Perspectives internationales (in French). McGill-Queen's University Press. p. 325+. ISBN 978-0-7735-8496-9.
- Yves Marguerat (1994). "La naissance d'une capitale africaine: Lomé". Revue française d'histoire d'outre-mer (in French). 81 – via Persee.fr.
- Philippe Gervais-Lambony and G. Kwami Nyassogbo, ed. (2008). Lomé: Dynamiques d'une ville africaine [Lome: Dynamics of an African city] (in French). Éditions Karthala. ISBN 978-2-8111-4224-7.
- Assogba Guézéré (2013). "Deux roues motorisées et étalement urbain à Lomé, quel lien avec la théorie des 'trois âges' de la ville?" [Motor bikes and urban sprawl in Lomé]. Norois (in French) (226): 41–62. doi:10.4000/norois.4549 – via Revues.org.

=== in German ===
- "Lome". Deutsches Kolonial-Lexikon (in German). 1920.
