= Sylvanus Olympio University Hospital =

University teaching hospital in Lomé, Togo

- Sylvanus Olympio University Hospital

Geography
- Location: 198 Rue de l'Hôpital, Lomé, Togo
- Coordinates: 6.143826°N 1.208654°E

Organisation
- Type: Teaching hospital
- Affiliated university: University of Lomé

Services
- Beds: 1,138 (theoretical capacity)

History
- Founded: 1954; 72 years ago

Links
- Website: https://chuso.tg/

The Sylvanus Olympio University Hospital, commonly known as CHU Sylvanus Olympio or CHU-SO, is a public teaching hospital in Lomé, Togo. It is one of the country's main referral hospitals and provides medical care, teaching and research in cooperation with the Faculty of Health Sciences of the University of Lomé.

== History ==
Construction of the hospital began in the late 1940s. The foundation stone was laid on 19 November 1949, and the hospital opened in 1954. It was initially known as the National Hospital Centre (, CNH).

Following the establishment of a medical school at the former University of Benin, now the University of Lomé, the hospital became a university teaching hospital in 1971. Decree No. 71-184 of 12 October 1971 transformed the National Hospital Centre into the Lomé University Hospital.

On 26 April 2012, the hospital was renamed the Sylvanus Olympio University Hospital after Sylvanus Olympio, the first President of Togo. The change was made under Decree No. 2012-020/PR.

== Activities ==
=== Medical care ===
The hospital provides general and specialised medical and surgical care, outpatient consultations, inpatient treatment and emergency services.

Medical departments include cardiology, internal medicine, endocrinology, nephrology, neurology, pulmonology, rheumatology, and infectious and tropical diseases. Surgical specialties include anesthesiology, general surgery, pediatric surgery, visceral surgery, neurosurgery, ophthalmology, otorhinolaryngology, urology, andrology, traumatology and orthopedic surgery.

The hospital also has departments of obstetrics and gynaecology, pediatrics and neonatal care, as well as diagnostic laboratory and medical imaging services.

=== Teaching ===
As a teaching hospital, CHU-SO participates in the clinical training of medical students and residents in cooperation with the Faculty of Health Sciences of the University of Lomé.

Students undertake clinical placements and specialist training in the hospital's various departments.

=== Research ===
The hospital is also a centre for medical research. Clinical studies, dissertations and other university research projects are conducted in its departments in association with academic staff and students.

== Services and facilities ==
CHU-SO includes medical, surgical, pediatric and obstetric departments, as well as diagnostic and pharmaceutical services.

Its laboratory services include pathological anatomy and cytology, biochemistry, hematology, immunology, histology and embryology, bacteriology, virology and parasitology. The hospital also operates radiology and medical imaging facilities and a hospital pharmacy.

== Modernisation ==
Several projects have been undertaken to renovate and modernise the hospital's infrastructure and medical equipment.

In 2022, the United Nations Development Programme (UNDP) supported the rehabilitation and equipping of the surgical emergency department. The twelve-month project included renovation of the premises, construction of an operating theatre and installation of medical equipment.

The project cost slightly more than 200 million West African CFA francs and increased the surgical emergency department's capacity from 12 to 30 beds.

The hospital also expanded its medical imaging facilities with the installation of a CT scanner.

== Organisation ==
The hospital occupies a site of approximately 10 hectares (25 acres) in the Tokoin district of Lomé.

Its theoretical capacity is 1,138 beds. Figures published in connection with the hospital's management reform reported 830 operational beds and 1,271 employees.

The hospital is a public administrative institution with legal personality and financial autonomy. Its director-general is Yawo Apélété Agbobli.

== See also ==
- Healthcare in Togo
- University of Lomé
