= Verona Volley =

Italian professional volleyball team

Rana Verona
- Full name: Rana Verona Volley
- Founded: 2021
- Ground: PalaSport Verona (Capacity: 5,350)
- Chairman: Stefano Fanini
- Manager: Fabio Soli
- League: Italian Volleyball League
- Website: Club home page

Uniforms
Home	Away

Rana Verona is a professional volleyball team based in Verona, Italy. The club plays in the SuperLega of the Italian Volleyball League.

== History ==
Verona Volley was founded in 2021, after NBV Verona dissolution.

The club's first title sponsor was WithU, giving the name of WithU Verona Volley for the 2022–2023 Season.

Starting from the 2023–2024 season, the club will be called Rana Verona, as the club signed a multi year sponsorship contract with Verona's company Giovanni Rana.

In the 2024-2025 season, the team reaches the Coppa Italia final, losing 2-3 against Perugia, and finishes 4th in the regular season.

== Team ==
Team roster – season 2024/2025

No.	Name	Date of birth	Position
1	(Australia) Aidan Zingel	19 November 1990	middle blocker
2	(Italy) Lorenzo Cortesia	26 September 1999	middle blocker
4	(Czech Republic) Donovan Džavoronok	23 July 1997	outside hitter
6	(Italy) Francesco D'Amico	9 October 1999	libero
12	(Denmark) Mads Jensen	24 April 1999	outside hitter
9	(Mali) Noumory Keita	26 June 2001	outside hitter
3	(United States) Jordan Ewer	18 March 1993	outside hitter
7	(Russia) Konstantin Abaev	7 June 1999	setter
13	(Italy) Luca Spirito	30 October 1993	setter
15	(Italy) Pietro Bonisoli	11 February 2005	libero
17	(Italy) Marco Vitelli	4 April 1996	middle blocker
19	(Slovenia) Rok Možič	17 January 2002	outside hitter
11	(Italy) Francesco Sani	6 July 2002	outside hitter
21	(Italy) Andrea Zanotti	28 October 1997	middle blocker
Head coach: (Italy) Dario Simoni; Assistant: (Italy) Alessandro Marchesan

Team roster – season 2017/2018
No.	Name	Date of birth	Position
1	(Italy) Stefano Mengozzi	May 6, 1985	middle blocker
2	(Argentina) Sebastián Solé	June 12, 1991	middle blocker
3	(Italy) Adriano Paolucci	February 11, 1979	setter
5	(Slovenia) Toncek Stern	November 14, 1995	outside hitter
6	(Italy) Federico Marretta	August 9, 1990	outside hitter
7	(Italy) Emanuele Birarelli	February 8, 1981	middle blocker
8	(Canada) Stephen Maar	December 6, 1994	outside hitter
10	(Italy) Thomas Frigo	May 19, 1997	libero
11	(Bulgaria) Aleks Grozdanov	March 28, 1998	middle blocker
12	(Greece) Mitar Tzourits	April 25, 1989	outside hitter
13	(Italy) Luca Spirito	October 30, 1993	setter
14	(Iran) Mohammadjavad Manavinejad	November 27, 1995	outside hitter
17	(United States) Thomas Jaeschke	September 4, 1993	outside hitter
18	(Italy) Nicola Pesaresi	February 11, 1991	libero
Head coach: Nikola Grbić; Assistant: Giancarlo D'Amico

Team roster – season 2016/2017
Calzedonia Verona
No.	Name	Date of birth	Position
1	(Australia) Aidan Zingel	November 19, 1990	middle blocker
2	(Serbia) Uroš Kovačević	May 6, 1993	outside hitter
3	(Italy) Adriano Paolucci	February 11, 1979	setter
5	(Belgium) François Lecat	April 19, 1993	outside hitter
6	(Portugal) Alexandre Ferreira	November 13, 1991	outside hitter
7	(Italy) Andrea Giovi	August 19, 1983	libero
8	(Italy) Michele Baranowicz	August 5, 1989	setter
9	(United States) Samuel Holt^{1}	June 20, 1993	outside hitter
10	(Italy) Thomas Frigo	May 19, 1997	libero
11	(Italy) Stefano Mengozzi	May 6, 1985	middle blocker
12	(Greece) Mitar Tzourits	April 25, 1989	outside hitter
14	(Slovenia) Toncek Stern	November 14, 1995	outside hitter
17	(Italy) Simone Anzani	February 24, 1992	middle blocker
18	(Italy) Luigi Randazzo^{2}	April 30, 1994	outside hitter
Head coach: Andrea Giani (2016–Dec 2016) Nikola Grbić (Dec 2016–present); Assistant: Matteo De Cecco^{1} Samuel Holt moved to Sieco Service Ortona on November 28, 2016.^{2} Luigi Randazzo joined the club on November 29, 2016.

Team roster – season 2015/2016
Calzedonia Verona
No.	Name	Date of birth	Position
1	(Australia) Aidan Zingel	November 19, 1990	middle blocker
2	(Serbia) Uroš Kovačević	May 6, 1993	outside hitter
3	(Australia) Nicola Pesaresi	February 11, 1991	libero
4	(Italy) Carmelo Gitto	July 3, 1987	middle blocker
5	(Belgium) François Lecat	April 19, 1993	outside hitter
6	(Italy) Luca Spirito	October 30, 1993	setter
7	(Italy) Thomas Frigo	May 19, 1997	libero
8	(Italy) Michele Baranowicz	August 5, 1989	setter
10	(Serbia) Saša Starović	October 19, 1988	opposite
13	(Italy) Giacomo Bellei	February 7, 1988	opposite
15	(United States) Taylor Sander	March 17, 1992	outside hitter
17	(Italy) Simone Anzani	February 24, 1992	middle blocker
18	(Poland) Bartosz Bućko	January 6, 1995	opposite
Head coach: Andrea Giani; Assistant: Matteo De Cecco

== Former names ==
- Calzedonia Verona 2017/2018
- Blu Volley Verona

== Achievements ==
- CEV Challenge Cup
  2016
- Italian Championship Serie A2
  2004
  2008
- Italian Cup Serie A2
  2004, 2008

== Kit manufacturer ==
The table below shows the history of kit providers for the Verona team.

Period	Kit provider
2021–	Macron

=== Sponsorship ===
Primary sponsors include: main sponsors like Calzedonia other sponsors: Petas, UnipolSai, Corsini Cancelleria, AGSM Verona, La Fortezza, Enoteca zero7, STAServizi and 30 different companies.
