= 2008 Summer Olympics closing ceremony flag bearers =

The flag bearers of 204 National Olympic Committees (NOCs) arrived into the main Olympic Stadium, during the closing ceremony of the 2008 Summer Olympics, held in Beijing on 24 August 2008. The flag bearers from each participating country entered the stadium informally in single file, and behind them marched all the athletes without any distinction or grouping by nationality. The blending of all the athletes is a tradition that dates from the 1956 Summer Olympics, after a suggestion by Australian-born British student John Ian Wing, who thought it would be a way of bringing the athletes of the world together as "one nation." The flags of each country were not necessarily carried by the same flag bearer as in the opening ceremony.

== List ==
The following is a list of each country's flag bearer. The list is sorted by the order in which each nation appears in the parade of nations. The names are given in their official designations by the IOC, and the Chinese names follow their official designations by the Beijing Organizing Committee for the Olympic Games.

Order	Nation	Chinese name	Pinyin	Flag bearer	Sport
1	Greece	希腊	Xīlà	Hrysopiyi Devetzi	Athletics
2	Guinea	几内亚	Jīnèiyà	Mariama Dalanda Barry	Taekwondo
3	Guinea-Bissau	几内亚比绍	Jīnèiyà Bǐshào	Alberto Dias	Official
4	Turkey	土耳其	Tǔěrqí	Azize Tanrıkulu	Taekwondo
5	Turkmenistan	土库曼斯坦	Tǔkùmànsītǎn	No flag bearer	
6	Yemen	也门	Yěmén	Mohammed Al-Boual	Official
7	Maldives	马尔代夫	Mǎěrdàifū	Ali Shareef	Athletics
8	Malta	马耳他	Mǎěrtā	Ryan Gambin	Swimming
9	Madagascar	马达加斯加	Mǎdájiāsījiā	Jean de Dieu Soloniaina	Boxing
10	Malaysia	马来西亚	Mǎláixīyà	Elizabeth Jimie	Diving
11	Mali	马里	Mǎlǐ	Daba Modibo Keïta	Taekwondo
12	Malawi	马拉维	Mǎlāwéi	Lucia Chandamale	Athletics
13	Macedonia	前南斯拉夫马其顿共和国	Qián Nánsīlāfū Mǎqídùn Gònghéguó	Atanas Nikolovski	Canoe / Kayak
14	Marshall Islands	马绍尔群岛	Mǎshàoěr Qúndǎo	Anju Jason	Taekwondo
15	Cayman Islands	开曼群岛	Kāimàn Qúndǎo	Shaune Fraser	Swimming
16	Bhutan	不丹	Bùdān	Tashi Peljor	Archery
17	Ecuador	厄瓜多尔	Èguāduōěr	Carlos Góngora	Boxing
18	Eritrea	厄立特里亚	Èlìtélǐyà	Nebiat Habtemariam	Athletics
19	Jamaica	牙买加	Yámǎijiā	Usain Bolt	Athletics
20	Belgium	比利时	Bǐlìshí	Tia Hellebaut	Athletics
21	Vanuatu	瓦努阿图	Wǎnǔātú	Priscila Tommy	Table tennis
22	Israel	以色列	Yǐsèliè	Shahar Tzuberi	Sailing
23	Japan	日本	Rìběn	Kosuke Kitajima	Swimming
24	Chinese Taipei	中华台北	Zhōnghuá Táiběi	Sung Yu-chi	Taekwondo
25	Central African Republic	中非	Zhōngfēi	Aymard Bosse Beranger	Athletics
26	Hong Kong	中国香港	Zhōngguó Xiānggǎng	Law Hiu Fung	Rowing
27	The Gambia	冈比亚	Gāngbǐyà	Badou Jack	Boxing
28	Benin	贝宁	Bèiníng	Fabienne Feraez	Athletics
29	Mauritius	毛里求斯	Máolǐqiúsī	Stéphan Buckland	Athletics
30	Mauritania	毛里塔尼亚	Máolǐtǎníyà	No flag bearer	
31	Denmark	丹麦	Dānmài	Lotte Friis	Swimming
32	Uganda	乌干达	Wūgāndá	Edwin Ekiring	Badminton
33	Ukraine	乌克兰	Wūkèlán	Vasyl Lomachenko	Boxing
34	Uruguay	乌拉圭	Wūlāguī	Alejandro Foglia	Sailing
35	Uzbekistan	乌兹别克斯坦	Wūzībiékèsītǎn	Artur Taymazov	Wrestling
36	Barbados	巴巴多斯	Bābāduōsī	Ryan Brathwaite	Athletics
37	Papua New Guinea	巴布亚新几内亚	Bābùyà Xīn Jǐnèiyà	Dika Toua	Weightlifting
38	Brazil	巴西	Bāxī	Maurren Maggi	Athletics
39	Paraguay	巴拉圭	Bālāguī	Víctor Fatecha	Athletics
40	Bahrain	巴林	Bālín	Ruqaya Al-Ghasra	Athletics
41	Bahamas	巴哈马	Bāhāmǎ	Leevan Sands	Athletics
42	Panama	巴拿马	Bānámǎ	No flag bearer	
43	Pakistan	巴基斯坦	Bājīsītǎn	Zeeshan Ashraf	Field hockey
44	Palestine	巴勒斯坦	Bālèsītǎn	No flag bearer	
45	Cuba	古巴	Gǔbā	Leonel Suárez	Athletics
46	Burkina Faso	布基纳法索	Bùjīnà Fǎsuǒ	Idrissa Sanou	Athletics
47	Burundi	布隆迪	Bùlóngdí	Francine Niyonizigiye	Athletics
48	Timor-Leste	东帝汶	Dōngdìwèn	Mariana Diaz Ximenez	Athletics
49	Qatar	卡塔尔	Kǎtǎěr	Khâleel Al-Jabir	Official
50	Rwanda	卢旺达	Lúwàngdá	Pamela Girimbabazi	Swimming
51	Luxembourg	卢森堡	Lúsēnbǎo	Sascha Palgen	Gymnastics
52	Chad	乍得	Zhàdé	No flag bearer	
53	Belarus	白俄罗斯	Báiéluósī	Andrei Aramnau	Weightlifting
54	India	印度	Yìndù	Vijender Kumar	Boxing
55	Indonesia	印度尼西亚	Yìndùníxīyà	Afait Budiman	Official
56	Lithuania	立陶宛	Lìtáowǎn	Gintarė Volungevičiūtė	Sailing
57	Niger	尼日尔	Nírìěr	Amada Sidiyane	Coach
58	Nigeria	尼日利亚	Nírìlìyà	Bose Kaffo	Table tennis
59	Nicaragua	尼加拉瓜	Níjiālāguā	No flag bearer	
60	Nepal	尼泊尔	Níbóěr	Deepak Bista	Taekwondo
61	Ghana	加纳	Jiānà	Vida Anim	Athletics
62	Canada	加拿大	Jiānádà	Karen Cockburn	Gymnastics
63	Gabon	加蓬	Jiāpéng	Wilfried Bingangoye	Athletics
64	San Marino	圣马力诺	Shèng Mǎlìnuò	Emanuele Nicolini	Swimming
65	Saint Vincent and the Grenadines	圣文森特和格林纳丁斯	Shèng Wénsēntè hé Gélínnàdīngsī	Kineke Alexander	Athletics
66	Saint Lucia	圣卢西亚	Shèng Lúxīyà	Levern Spencer	Athletics
67	São Tomé and Príncipe	圣多美与普林西比	Shèng Duōměi hé Pǔlínxībǐ	NOC assistant	
68	Saint Kitts and Nevis	圣基茨和尼维斯	Shèng Jīcí hé Níwéisī	Virgil Hodge	Athletics
69	Guyana	圭亚那	Guīyànà	Aliann Pompey	Athletics
70	Djibouti	吉布提	Jíbùtí	Moussa Egueh Fardouza	Coach
71	Kyrgyzstan	吉尔吉斯斯坦	Jíěrjísīsītǎn	Bazar Bazarguruev	Wrestling
72	Laos	老撾	Lǎowō	No flag bearer	
73	Armenia	亚美尼亚	Yàměiníyà	Abutun Enokyan	Wrestling
74	Spain	西班牙	Xībānyá	Joan Llaneras	Cycling
75	Bermuda	百慕大	Bǎimùdà	Kiera Aitken	Swimming
76	Liechtenstein	列支敦士登	Lièzhīdūnshìdēng	Oliver Geissmann	Shooting
77	Republic of the Congo	刚果（布）	Gāngguǒ (Bù)	Pamela Mouele-Mboussi	Athletics
78	Democratic Republic of the Congo	刚果（金）	Gāngguǒ (Jīn)	Eric Kibanza	Judo
79	Iraq	伊拉克	Yīlākè	Hussein Jebur	Rowing
80	Iran	伊朗	Yīlǎng	Asghar Rahimi Hosseinieh	Official
81	Guatemala	危地马拉	Wēidìmǎlā	Rita Sanz-Agero	Modern pentathlon
82	Hungary	匈牙利	Xiōngyálì	Attila Vajda	Canoe / Kayak
83	Dominican Republic	多米尼加共和国	Duōmǐníjiā Gònghéguó	Felix Diaz	Boxing
84	Dominica	多米尼克	Duōmǐníkè	Erison Hurtault	Athletics
85	Togo	多哥	Duōgē	Lidi Bessi Kama	Official
86	Iceland	冰岛	Bīngdǎo	Sigfús Sigurðsson	Handball
87	Guam	关岛	Guāndǎo	Maria Dunn	Wrestling
88	Angola	安哥拉	Āngēlā	Filomena Trindade	Handball
89	Antigua and Barbuda	安提瓜和巴布达	Āntíguā hé Bābùdá	Cliff Williams	Official
90	Andorra	安道尔	Āndàoěr	Daniel García González	Judo
91	Tonga	汤加	Tāngjiā	Maamaloa Lolohea	Weightlifting
92	Jordan	约旦	Yuēdàn	Nadin Dawani	Taekwondo
93	Equatorial Guinea	赤道几内亚	Chìdào Jīnèiyà	Emilia Mikue Ondo	Athletics
94	Finland	芬兰	Fēnlán	Tero Pitkämäki	Athletics
95	Croatia	克罗地亚	Kèluódìyà	Tamara Boroš	Table tennis
96	Sudan	苏丹	Sūdān	Abubaker Kaki	Athletics
97	Suriname	苏里南	Sūlǐnán	Jurgen Themen	Athletics
98	Libya	利比亚	Lìbǐyǎ	Mohamed Ben Saleh	Judo
99	Liberia	利比里亚	Lìbǐlǐyà	No flag bearer	
100	Belize	伯利兹	Bólìzī	Tricia Flores	Athletics
101	Cape Verde	佛得角	Fódéjiǎo	Nelson Cruz	Athletics
102	Cook Islands	库克群岛	Kùkè Qúndǎo	Tereapii Tapoki	Athletics
103	Saudi Arabia	沙特	Shātè	Saad Al-Asmari	Athletics (non-participant)
104	Algeria	阿尔及利亚	Āěrjílìyà	Salim Iles	Swimming
105	Albania	阿尔巴尼亚	Āěrbāníyà	Sahit Prizreni	Wrestling
106	United Arab Emirates	阿联酋	Ā Lián Qiú	Omar Alsalfa	Athletics
107	Argentina	阿根廷	Āgēntíng	Juan Esteban Curuchet	Cycling
108	Oman	阿曼	Āmàn	Mansoor Al-Tauqi	Official
109	Aruba	阿鲁巴	Ālǔbā	Jan Roodzant	Swimming
110	Afghanistan	阿富汗	Āfùhàn	Rohullah Nikpai	Taekwondo
111	Azerbaijan	阿塞拜疆	Āsāibàijiāng	Shahin Imranov	Boxing
112	Namibia	纳米比亚	Nàmǐbǐyà	Mannie Heymans	Cycling
113	Tanzania	坦桑尼亚	Tǎnsāngníyà	Fabiano Joseph Naasi	Athletics
114	Latvia	拉脱维亚	Lātuōwéiyà	Maris Strombergs	Cycling
115	Great Britain	英国	Yīngguó	Chris Hoy	Cycling
116	British Virgin Islands	英属维尔京群岛	Yīngshǔ Wéiěrjīng Qúndǎo	Tahesia Harrigan	Athletics
117	Kenya	肯尼亚	Kěnníyà	Wilfred Bungei	Athletics
118	Romania	罗马尼亚	Luōmǎníyà	Georgeta Andrunache	Rowing
119	Palau	帕劳	Pàláo	Amber Yobech	Swimming
120	Tuvalu	图瓦卢	Túwǎlú	Okilani Tinilau	Athletics
121	Venezuela	委内瑞拉	Wěinèiruìlā	Dalia Contreras	Taekwondo
122	Solomon Islands	所罗门群岛	Suǒluōmén Qúndǎo	Pauline Kwalea	Athletics
123	France	法国	Fǎguó	Tony Estanguet	Canoe / Kayak
124	Poland	波兰	Bōlán	Tomasz Majewski	Athletics
125	Puerto Rico	波多黎各	Bōduō Lígè	McWilliams Arroyo	Boxing
126	Bosnia and Herzegovina	波黑	Bōhēi	Amel Mekić	Judo
127	Bangladesh	孟加拉国	Mèngjiālāguó	Beauty Nazmun Nahar	Athletics
128	Bolivia	玻利维亚	Bōlìwéiyà	Fadrique Iglesias	Athletics
129	Norway	挪威	Nuówēi	Gro Hammerseng	Handball
130	South Africa	南非	Nánfēi	Sifiso Nhlapo	Cycling
131	Cambodia	柬埔寨	Jiǎnpǔzhài	Hem Bunting	Athletics
132	Kazakhstan	哈萨克斯坦	Hāsàkèsītǎn	Yerkebulan Shynaliyev	Boxing
133	Kuwait	科威特	Kēwēitè	Mohammad Al Azemi	Athletics
134	Ivory Coast	科特迪瓦	Kētè Díwǎ	Sebastien Konan	Taekwondo
135	Comoros	科摩罗	Kēmóluó	Youssouf Mhadjou	Athletics
136	Bulgaria	保加利亚	Bǎojiālìyà	Matey Kaziyski	Volleyball
137	Russia	俄罗斯	Éluōsī / Éluósī	Andrey Silnov	Athletics
138	Syria	叙利亚	Xùlìyà	Kenan Zaheraldeen	Official
139	United States	美国	Měiguó	Khatuna Lorig	Archery
140	Virgin Islands	美属维尔京群岛	Měishǔ Wéiěrjīng Qúndǎo	John Jackson	Boxing
141	American Samoa	美属萨摩亚	Měishǔ Sàmóyà	Shanahan Sanitoa	Athletics
142	Honduras	洪都拉斯	Hóngdūlāsī	Miguel Ferrera	Taekwondo
143	Zimbabwe	津巴布韦	Jīnbābùwéi	Kirsty Coventry	Swimming
144	Tunisia	突尼斯	Tūnísī	No flag bearer	
145	Thailand	泰国	Tàiguó	Somjit Jongjohor	Boxing
146	Egypt	埃及	Aījí	Amro El Geziry	Modern Pentathlon
147	Ethiopia	埃塞俄比亚	Aīsāiébǐyà	Kenenisa Bekele	Athletics
148	Lesotho	莱索托	Láisuǒtuō	Emanuel Thabiso Nketu	Boxing
149	Mozambique	莫桑比克	Mòsāngbǐkè	Chakyl Camal	Swimming
150	Netherlands	荷兰	Hélán	Maarten van der Weijden	Swimming
151	Netherlands Antilles	荷属安的列斯	Héshǔ Āndelièsī	Churandy Martina	Athletics
152	Grenada	格林纳达	Gélínnàdá	Neisha Bernard-Thomas	Athletics
153	Georgia	格鲁吉亚	Gélǔjíyà	Revazi Mindorashvili	Wrestling
154	Somalia	索马里	Suǒmǎlǐ	Khadija Adan Dahir	Official
155	Colombia	哥伦比亚	Gēlúnbǐyà	Juan Guillermo Urán	Diving
156	Costa Rica	哥斯达黎加	Gēsīdá Líjiā	Allan Segura	Athletics
157	Trinidad and Tobago	特立尼达和多巴哥	Tèlìnídá hé Duōbāgē	Richard Thompson	Athletics
158	Peru	秘鲁	Bìlǔ	Peter López	Taekwondo
159	Ireland	爱尔兰	Aìěrlán	Kenny Egan	Boxing
160	Estonia	爱沙尼亚	Aìshāníyà	Gerd Kanter	Athletics
161	Haiti	海地	Hǎidì	Dodeley Orelus	Official
162	Czech Republic	捷克	Jiékè	Vera Cechlova	Athletics
163	Kiribati	基里巴斯	Jīlǐbāsī	Birimaka Tekanene	Official
164	Philippines	菲律宾	Fēilǜbīn	Miguel Molina	Swimming
165	El Salvador	萨尔瓦多	Sàěrwǎduō	Eva Dimas	Weightlifting
166	Samoa	萨摩亚	Sàmóyà	Aunese Curreen	Athletics
167	Federated States of Micronesia	密克罗尼西亚	Mìkèluóníxīyà	Debra Daniel	Swimming
168	Tajikistan	塔吉克斯坦	Tǎjíkèsītǎn	Yusup Abdusalomov	Wrestling
169	Vietnam	越南	Yuènán	Nguyen Van Hung	Taekwondo
170	Botswana	博茨瓦纳	Bócíwǎnà	Khumiso Ikgopoleng	Boxing
171	Sri Lanka	斯里兰卡	Sīlǐ Lánkǎ	Susanthika Jayasinghe	Athletics
172	Swaziland	斯威士兰	Sīwēishìlán	Luke Hall	Swimming
173	Slovenia	斯洛文尼亚	Sīluòwénníyà	Spela Ponomarenko	Canoe / Kayak
174	Slovakia	斯洛伐克	Sīluòfákè	Michal Riszdorfer	Canoe / Kayak
175	Portugal	葡萄牙	Pútáoyá	Vanessa Fernandes	Triathlon
176	South Korea	韩国	Hánguó	Jang Miran	Weightlifting
177	Fiji	斐济	Fěijì	Carl Probert	Swimming
178	Cameroon	喀麦隆	Kāmàilóng	No flag bearer	
179	Montenegro	黑山	Hēishān	Veljko Uskoković	Water polo
180	North Korea	朝鲜民主主义人民共和国	Cháoxiǎn Mínzhŭ Zhŭyì Rénmín Gònghéguó	Pak Hyon-Suk	Weightlifting
181	Chile	智利	Zhìlì	Soraya Jadué	Rowing
182	Austria	奥地利	Aòdìlì	Ludwig Paischer	Judo
183	Myanmar	缅甸	Miǎndiàn	No flag bearer	
184	Switzerland	瑞士	Ruìshì	Sergei Aschwanden	Judo
185	Sweden	瑞典	Ruìdiǎn	Jorgen Persson	Table tennis
186	Nauru	瑙鲁	Nǎolǔ	Itte Detenamo	Weightlifting
187	Mongolia	蒙古	Mēnggǔ	Badar Uugan Enkhbat	Boxing
188	Singapore	新加坡	Xīnjiāpō	Li Jiawei	Table tennis
189	New Zealand	新西兰	Xīn Xīlán	Caroline Evers-Swindell, Georgina Evers-Swindell	Rowing
190	Italy	意大利	Yìdàlì	Clemente Russo	Boxing
191	Senegal	塞内加尔	Sāinèijiāěr	Bineta Diedhiou	Taekwondo
192	Serbia	塞尔维亚	Sāiěrwéiyà	Saša Starović	Volleyball
193	Seychelles	塞舌尔	Sàishéěr	Tony Lespoir	Canoe / Kayak
194	Sierra Leone	塞拉利昂	Sàilā Lìáng	Michaela Kargbo	Athletics
195	Cyprus	塞浦路斯	Sāipǔlùsī	Andri Eleftheriou	Shooting
196	Mexico	墨西哥	Mòxīgē	Tatiana Ortiz	Diving
197	Lebanon	黎巴嫩	Líbānèn	No flag bearer	
198	Germany	德国	Déguó	Katrin Wagner	Canoe / Kayak
199	Moldova	摩尔多瓦	Móěrduōwǎ	Nicolae Ceban	Wrestling
200	Monaco	摩纳哥	Mónàgē	No flag bearer	
201	Morocco	摩洛哥	Móluògē	No flag bearer	
202	Australia	澳大利亚	Àodàlìyǎ	Stephanie Rice	Swimming
203	Zambia	赞比亚	Zànbǐyà	Rachael Nachula	Athletics
204	China	中国	Zhōngguó	Zhang Ning	Badminton
