= Top Volley Latina =

Professional volleyball team based in Latina, Italy

Top Volley Cisterna
- Full name: Top Volley Cisterna
- Short name: Top Volley
- Founded: 1972
- Ground: Palazzetto dello Sport, Latina (Capacity: 3,000)
- Chairman: Gianrio Falivene
- Manager: (Italy) Fabio Soli
- League: Italian Volleyball League
- Website: Club home page

Uniforms
Home	Away

Top Volley Latina is a professional volleyball team based in Latina, Italy. The club plays in Serie A1 of the Italian Volleyball League.

== Achievements ==
- CEV Cup
  2013
- CEV Challenge Cup
  2014
- Italian Championship Serie A2
  2009

== Team ==
Team roster – season 2022/2023

No.	Name	Date of birth	Position
1	(Australia) Aidan Zingel	November 19, 1990 (age 35)	middle blocker
4	(Argentina) Javier Martinez	February 27, 1995 (age 30)	opposite hitter
5	(Italy) Damiano Catania	March 28, 2001 (age 24)	libero
6	(Germany) Denis Kaliberda	June 24, 1990 (age 35)	outside hitter
7	(Croatia) Marko Sedlaček	July 29, 1996 (age 29)	outside hitter
8	(Italy) Michael Zanni	November 5, 1998 (age 27)	setter
10	(Italy) Andrea Mattei	July 23, 1993 (age 32)	middle blocker
11	(Croatia) Petar Đirlić	May 27, 1997 (age 28)	opposite
13	(Italy) Andrea Rossi	February 14, 1989 (age 36)	middle blocker
15	(Italy) Matteo Staforini	May 25, 2003 (age 22)	libero
17	(Italy) Michele Baranowicz	August 5, 1989 (age 36)	setter
20	(Turkey) Efe Bayram	March 1, 2002 (age 23)	outside hitter
22	(Cuba) José Miguel Gutiérrez	October 27, 2001 (age 24)	outside hitter
Head coach: (Italy) Fabio Soli; Assistant: (Italy) Elio Tommasino; Assistant: (Italy) Roberto Cocconi

Team roster – season 2017/2018
1	(Italy) Louis Caccioppola	July 29, 1998 (age 27)	libero
2	(United States) Erik Shoji	August 24, 1989 (age 36)	libero
4	(Italy) Carmelo Gitto	July 3, 1987 (age 38)	middle blocker
5	(Italy) Daniele Sottile	August 17, 1979 (age 46)	setter
7	(France) Nicolas Le Goff	February 15, 1992 (age 33)	middle blocker
8	(Italy) Carlo De Angelis	January 10, 1996 (age 30)	libero
9	(France) Jordan Corteggiani	May 7, 1991 (age 34)	outside hitter
11	(Italy) Cristian Savani	February 22, 1982 (age 43)	setter
13	(Italy) Andrea Rossi	February 14, 1989 (age 36)	middle blocker
14	(Japan) Yūki Ishikawa	December 11, 1995 (age 30)	outside hitter
15	(Italy) Gabriele Maruotti	March 25, 1988 (age 37)	outside hitter
17	(Chinese Taipei) Pei-Hung Huang	September 17, 1990 (age 35)	setter
18	(Serbia) Saša Starović	October 19, 1988 (age 37)	opposite
Head coach: Vincenzo Di Pinto; Assistant: Marco Franchi

Team roster – season 2016/2017
Top Volley Latina
No.	Name	Date of birth	Position
2	(Belgium) Kevin Klinkenberg	October 4, 1990 (age 35)	opposite
3	(Italy) Alessandro Fei	November 29, 1978 (age 47)	outside hitter
4	(Italy) Carmelo Gitto	July 3, 1987 (age 38)	middle blocker
5	(Italy) Daniele Sottile	August 17, 1979 (age 46)	setter
8	(Italy) Matteo Pistolesi	March 14, 1995 (age 30)	setter
9	(Montenegro) Bojan Strugar	June 30, 1995 (age 30)	outside hitter
10	(Cuba) Danger Quintana	May 19, 1994 (age 31)	middle blocker
11	(Italy) Louis Caccioppola	July 29, 1998 (age 27)	libero
13	(Italy) Andrea Rossi	February 14, 1989 (age 36)	middle blocker
14	(Japan) Yūki Ishikawa	December 11, 1995 (age 30)	outside hitter
15	(Italy) Gabriele Maruotti	March 25, 1988 (age 37)	outside hitter
16	(Bulgaria) Rozalin Penchev	December 11, 1994 (age 31)	outside hitter
18	(Italy) Fabio Fanuli	February 10, 1985 (age 40)	libero
Head coach: Daniele Bagnoli; Assistant: Marco Franchi
