= Serhat Coşkun =

Turkish volleyball player (born 1987)

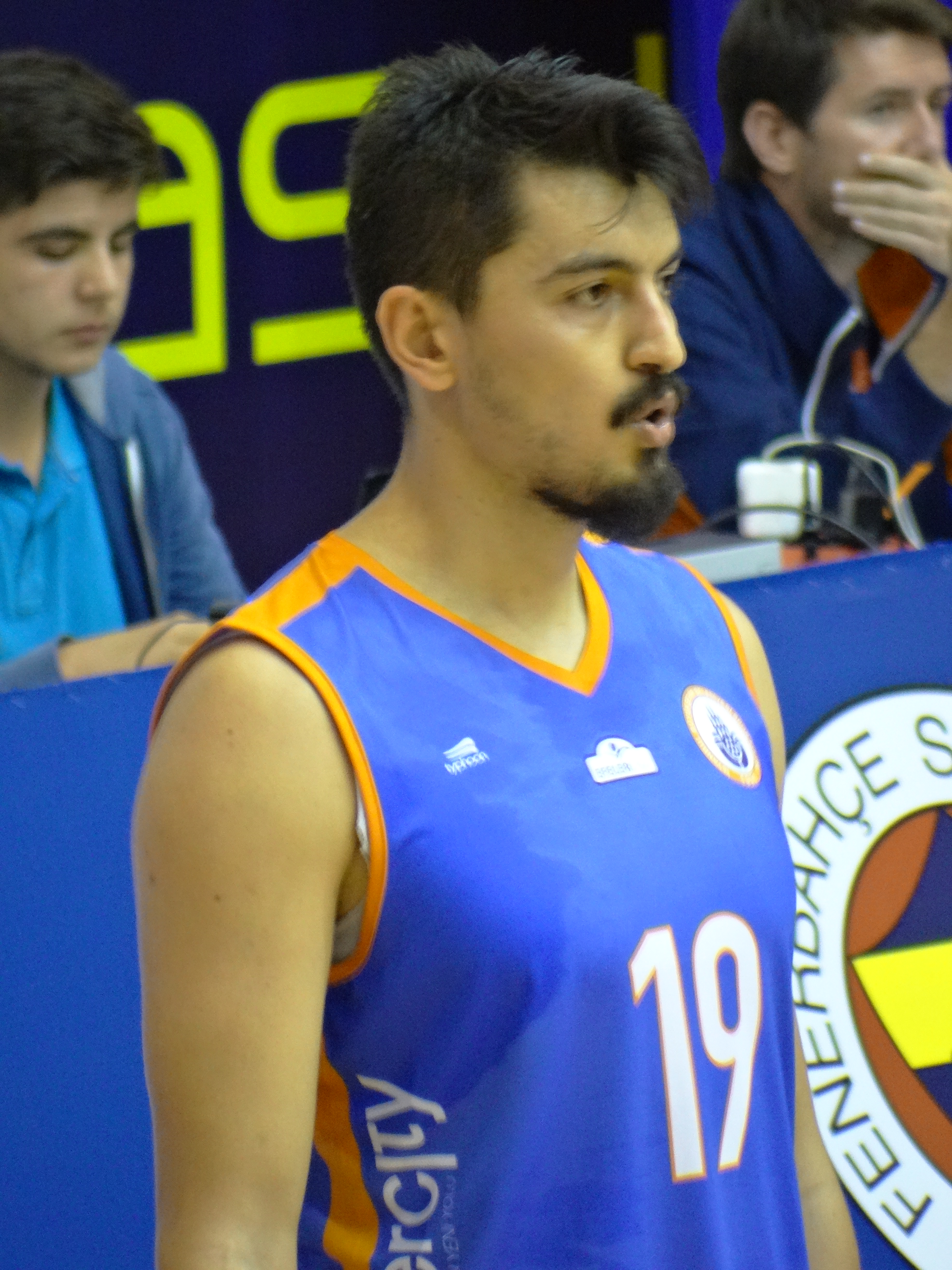
- Serhat Coşkun in 2017

Personal information
- Born: July 18, 1987 (age 39); Yozgat, Turkey
- Height: 1.98 m (6 ft 6 in)
- Weight: 90 kg (200 lb)
- Spike: 370 cm (150 in)
- Block: 360 cm (140 in)

Volleyball information
- Position: Opposite
- Current club: (Turkey) Halkbank Ankara
- Number: 9

Career
| Years | Teams |
|---|---|
| 2009-present | Halkbank Ankara |

National team
| Turkey |

Serhat Coşkun (born July 18, 1987) is a Turkish volleyball player. He plays as opposite for Halkbank Ankara since 2009 and wears number 9. 1.98 m (6 ft 6 in) tall at 90 kg (200 lb), he capped 60 times for the Turkey men's national volleyball team. Coşkun played in the past also for Tokat Belediye Plevne, Arçelik, Bursa Emniyet and Antalya DS.

In 2003, he became international when admitted to the Turkey boy's youth national team.

Serhat Coşkun celebrated his first international champion title with Halkbank Ankara at the Men's CEV Cup 2012–13.

== Awards ==
=== Individuals ===
- 2012 Men's European Volleyball League Best Scorer

=== Clubs ===
- Men's CEV Cup 2012–13 - Champion, with Halkbank Ankara
