= 2013 FIVB Volleyball World League qualification =

The 2013 FIVB Volleyball World League qualification was a qualification tournament to determine the final two spots for the 2013 World League. It was held from 24 August to 9 September 2012.

== Teams ==
Team	Qualified as
Second Round
Japan	15th place of the 2012 FIVB Volleyball World League
Portugal	16th place of the 2012 FIVB Volleyball World League
First Round
Egypt	African Challenger (No. 11 in the World Ranking)
Iran	Asian Challenger (No. 12 in the World Ranking)
Dominican Republic	American Challenger (No. 46 in the World Ranking)
Netherlands	European Challenger (No. 36 in the World Ranking)

== Pool standing procedure ==
1. Match points
2. Number of matches won
3. Sets ratio
4. Points ratio
5. Result of the last match between the tied teams

Match won 3–0 or 3–1: 3 match points for the winner, 0 match points for the loser
Match won 3–2: 2 match points for the winner, 1 match point for the loser

== First round ==
- All times are local.

=== Playoff 1 ===
Pos	Team	Pld	W	L	Pts	SW	SL	SR	SPW	SPL	SPR
1	Netherlands	2	2	0	5	6	2	3.000	195	181	1.077
2	Dominican Republic	2	0	2	1	2	6	0.333	181	195	0.928

Date	Time		Score		Set 1	Set 2	Set 3	Set 4	Set 5	Total	Report
24 Aug	19:30	Netherlands	3–0	Dominican Republic	25–22	25–22	25–21			75–65	P2 P3
25 Aug	19:30	Netherlands	3–2	Dominican Republic	25–27	25–21	24–26	30–28	16–14	120–116	P2 P3

=== Playoff 2 ===
Pos	Team	Pld	W	L	Pts	SW	SL	SR	SPW	SPL	SPR
1	Iran	2	2	0	6	6	1	6.000	186	153	1.216
2	Egypt	2	0	2	0	1	6	0.167	153	186	0.823

Date	Time		Score		Set 1	Set 2	Set 3	Set 4	Set 5	Total	Report
31 Aug	20:00	Egypt	0–3	Iran	31–33	22–25	19–25			72–83	P2 P3
02 Sep	20:00	Egypt	1–3	Iran	12–25	30–28	17–25	22–25		81–103	P2 P3

== Second round ==
- All times are local.

=== Playoff 1 ===
Pos	Team	Pld	W	L	Pts	SW	SL	SR	SPW	SPL	SPR
1	Netherlands	2	2	0	4	6	4	1.500	219	223	0.982
2	Portugal	2	0	2	2	4	6	0.667	223	219	1.018

Date	Time		Score		Set 1	Set 2	Set 3	Set 4	Set 5	Total	Report
01 Sep	17:00	Netherlands	3–2	Portugal	26–24	25–23	24–26	22–25	20–18	117–116	P2 P3
02 Sep	13:00	Netherlands	3–2	Portugal	20–25	25–23	17–25	25–21	15–13	102–107	P2 P3

=== Playoff 2 ===
Pos	Team	Pld	W	L	Pts	SW	SL	SR	SPW	SPL	SPR
1	Iran	2	2	0	6	6	0	MAX	150	110	1.364
2	Japan	2	0	2	0	0	6	0.000	110	150	0.733

Date	Time		Score		Set 1	Set 2	Set 3	Set 4	Set 5	Total	Report
07 Sep	19:00	Iran	3–0	Japan	25–19	25–14	25–23			75–56	P2 P3
09 Sep	19:00	Iran	3–0	Japan	25–16	25–17	25–21			75–54	P2 P3
