= Taylor Sander =

American volleyball player (born 1992)

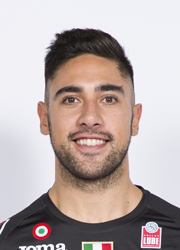

Personal information
- Full name: Taylor Lee Sander
- Nickname: The Sandman; Prince-Ti-Tey
- Born: March 17, 1992 (age 34); Fountain Valley, California, U.S.
- Height: 6 ft 4 in (1.93 m)
- Weight: 180 lb (80 kg)
- Spike: 141 in (358 cm)
- Block: 130 in (330 cm)
- Education: Brigham Young University

Volleyball information
- Position: Outside hitter
- Number: 3

Career
Years
- 2011–2014
- 2014–2016
- 2016–2017
- 2017
- 2017–2018
- 2018–2019
- 2020–2021
- 2024–Present
Teams
- BYU Cougars
- Verona Volley
- Beijing Volleyball
- Al Arabi Doha
- Volley Lube
- Sada Cruzeiro
- Skra Bełchatów
- Bogor LavAni

National team
2012–2021	United States
Medal record
Men's volleyball
Representing United States
Olympic Games
Bronze medal – third place	2016 Rio de Janeiro
FIVB World Championship
Bronze medal – third place	2018 Bulgaria/Italy
FIVB World Cup
Gold medal – first place	2015 Japan
FIVB World League
Gold medal – first place	2014 Florence
Bronze medal – third place	2015 Rio de Janeiro
FIVB Nations League
Silver medal – second place	2019 Chicago
Bronze medal – third place	2018 Lille
Pan American Cup
Gold medal – first place	2012 Santo Domingo
NORCECA Championship
Gold medal – first place	2017 Colorado Springs

Taylor Lee Sander (born March 17, 1992) is an American professional beach volleyball player and indoor volleyball player. As a member of the U.S. national team, he won a bronze medal at the 2016 Summer Olympics and the 2018 World Championship. The 2014 World League and the 2015 World Cup winner.

== Personal life ==
Sander is the son of Steven and Kera Sander. He has an older sister and a younger brother, Brenden, who also plays volleyball and is a current member of Brazilian team Sada Volei Cruzeiro. He graduated from Norco High School in Norco, California. At BYU Taylor majored in Global Studies. His parents are LDS, and he grew up LDS (The Church of Jesus Christ of Latter-day Saints – also known by the nickname Mormons). In July 2015, he married Rachel McQuivey, who represented the BYU Track & Field team as a long jumper and hurdler. In June 2018, Taylor and Rachel welcomed their first child and in November of 2021 they welcomed their second. Taylor and Rachel divorced in July 2021, prior to the birth of their second child.

== Career ==
=== Beach Volleyball ===
In the summer of 2022, Sander started his professional beach volleyball career with Taylor Crabb. The team won the 2022 AVP Phoenix Open - Sept 24 - 25. Then, two months later, on November 13, 2022 Sander and Crabb also won the 2022 AVP Tour Series Huntington Beach Open, having entered the tournament as the #1 seed. They came away with $8,000 in prize winnings.

=== College ===
He was recruited by USC, Long Beach State, UC Irvine, and BYU. At Brigham Young University Sander was a four-time AVCA All-American (three first-team citations, one second-team citation), the 2014 AVCA Player of the Year, 2013 and 2014 MPSF Player of the Year, 2013 and 2014 MPSF Tournament MVP, and four-time All-MPSF First Team. He holds the BYU all-time single-match record for service aces (nine) and career service aces (182). In the rally-scoring era, is No. 1 at BYU in career kills (1,743), career attempts (3,464), career service aces (182), season attempts (1,021 in 2014), season service aces (55 in 2014) and aces in a match (nine).

Regarding his decision to attend BYU he said in January 2012, "Growing up in Huntington Beach (Calif.) I've always been a big BYU fan. I grew up LDS and with my parents being LDS, that was the school we always cheered for and I've always wanted to go to BYU since I was a kid."

=== Club ===
Sander signed a contract with Verona Volley, an Italian Serie A1 team (top level), on June 10, 2014.

=== National team ===
Sander competed with Team USA in the 2014 FIVB World League. 4th ranked U.S. upset 1st ranked Brazil to win the tournament, and Sander was named "best outside spiker" and tournament MVP (which included a $30,000 prize award).

He was on the U.S. men's roster for the 2014 FIVB World Championships in Poland, August 30 – September 21, 2014 and was selected as U.S. Volleyball's Men's Team Rookie of the Year.

He was a member of the U.S. team that competed in the 2015 NORCECA Champions Cup in Detroit, Michigan, May 21–23, 2015. Against Mexico May 21, 2015, Sander had 7 points on 6 spikes and 1 block. The U.S. defeated Mexico 25-15, 25-12, 25-17. The following day Team USA defeated Cuba in four sets, 20-25, 25-17, 25-10, 25-14, guaranteeing a top two finish and a spot in the 2015 FIVB World Cup to be held September 8–23, 2015 in Japan. Sander totaled 15 points on 10 spikes, 3 blocks, and 2 aces. In the championship match, May 23, 2015, the U.S. lost to Canada in five sets, 22-25, 25-19, 25-21, 21-25, 15-17. He again totaled 15 points, this time on 12 spikes and 3 aces.

He is on the U.S. Preliminary Roster for the 2015 FIVB World League. He played in the first World League match against Iran, May 30, 2015, in Los Angeles. He led all scorers with 19 points on 16 kills, two blocks and one ace. During the U.S. broadcast of this match on the NBC Sports Network May 31, 2015, Sander appeared to injure his ankle late in the 3rd set after colliding with a teammate on a block attempt and landing awkwardly. Thomas Jaeschke came in soon afterwards and finished out the set, but Sander returned to play all of the 4th set.

He did not play in the second match against Iran and was not on the roster for the next two matches against Russia. He also was not on the roster for the matches against Poland June 12 and 13, 2015, in Hoffman Estates, Illinois, due to an ankle injury, but did travel and practice with the team. Coach John Speraw mentioned during the press conference following the 2nd match against Poland that he was not sure when Sander would be ready to play again.

He traveled with the team to Iran and was back on the roster for the June 19 and 21 matches played/to be played in Tehran, Iran at the Azadi Stadium. He played the entire 3rd set of the 0-3 (19-25, 27-29, 20-25) loss to Iran June 19, 2015. He scored 5 points on 5 kills from 9 attempts. He also had 1 dig and 4 excellent receptions out of 5 attempts.

== Honors ==
=== Club ===
- CEV Champions League
  - 2017–18 – with Cucine Lube Civitanova
- FIVB Club World Championship
  - Poland 2017 – with Cucine Lube Civitanova
- CSV South American Club Championship
  - Belo Horizonte 2019 – with Sada Cruzeiro
- CEV Challenge Cup
  - 2015–16 – with Calzedonia Verona
- Domestic
  - 2016–17 Qatari Cup, with Al Arabi Doha
  - 2018–19 Brazilian Cup, with Sada Cruzeiro

=== Youth national team ===
- 2008 NORCECA U19 Championship
- 2010 NORCECA U21 Championship

=== Individual awards ===
- 2012: Pan American Cup – Most valuable player
- 2013: NCAA national championship – All-tournament Team
- 2013: Pan American Cup – Best server
- 2014: AVCA National Player of the Year
- 2014: NCAA national championship – All-tournament team
- 2014: FIVB World League – Most valuable player
- 2014: FIVB World League – Best outside hitter
- 2016: CEV Challenge Cup – Most valuable player
- 2018: FIVB Nations League – Best outside hitter
- 2019: CSV South American Club Championship – Most valuable player
