= Hüseyin Koç =

Turkish volleyball player (born 1979)

Personal information
- Born: 30 July 1979 (age 47); Bursa, Turkey
- Height: 1.97 m (6 ft 5 1/2 in)
- Weight: 91 kg (201 lb)
- Spike: 330 cm (130 in)
- Block: 310 cm (120 in)

Volleyball information
- Position: Setter
- Current club: Halkbank Ankara

Career
Years
- 1999-2000
- 2000-05
- 2006-08
- 2008-11
- 2011-12
Teams
- Çankaya Belediyesi
- Ziraat Bankası Ankara
- İstanbul BB
- Arkas Spor
- İstanbul BB

National team
| Turkey |
Honours
Men's Volleyball
Representing Turkey
Universiade
| Gold medal – first place | 2005 İzmir | Team |
Representing Halkbank Ankara
CEV Cup
| Gold medal – first place | 2012-13 Cup | Team |
- Last updated: 5 September 2013

Hüseyin Koç (born 30 July 1979 in Bursa, Turkey) is a Turkish former volleyball player. He is 1.97 m (6 ft 5 1/2 in) tall and played in the setter position. In the 2012–13 season, he was a member of Halkbank Ankara. After playing for Galatasaray, he retired from volleyball. He now runs his own volleyball academy, SAS Voleybol Akademi, in Bursa, Turkey.

== Family life ==
Hüseyin Koç was born on 30 July 1979 in Bursa, Turkey. In his youth years, he played football as a goalkeeper. However, because unsuccessful, he switched over to playing volleyball.

In 2010, he married Dilay Okta, who played eight-year long in Nilüfer Belediyespor Women's Volleyball Team before she retired and returned to her profession as an interior architect. The couple has a son, Mehmet Kuzey, born in 2012.

== Career ==
Koç played for Çankaya Belediyesi, Ziraat Bankası Ankara, Arkas Spor and Istanbul Büyükşehir Belediyespor before he signed for Halkbank Ankara in May 2012.

He was member of the Turkey men's national volleyball team, which became champion at the 2005 Summer Universiade held in İzmir, Turkey. He won the Men's CEV Cup 2012–13 with Halkbank Ankara and was named "Best Setter" of the tournament.

Hüseyin Koç was a member of the Turkey men's national volleyball team.

== Awards ==
=== Individual ===
- Men's CEV Cup 2012–13 "Best Setter"

=== National team ===
- 2005 Summer Universiade - Gold

=== Club ===
- Men's CEV Cup 2012–13 - Champion with Halkbank Ankara
