= Reid Priddy =

American volleyball player

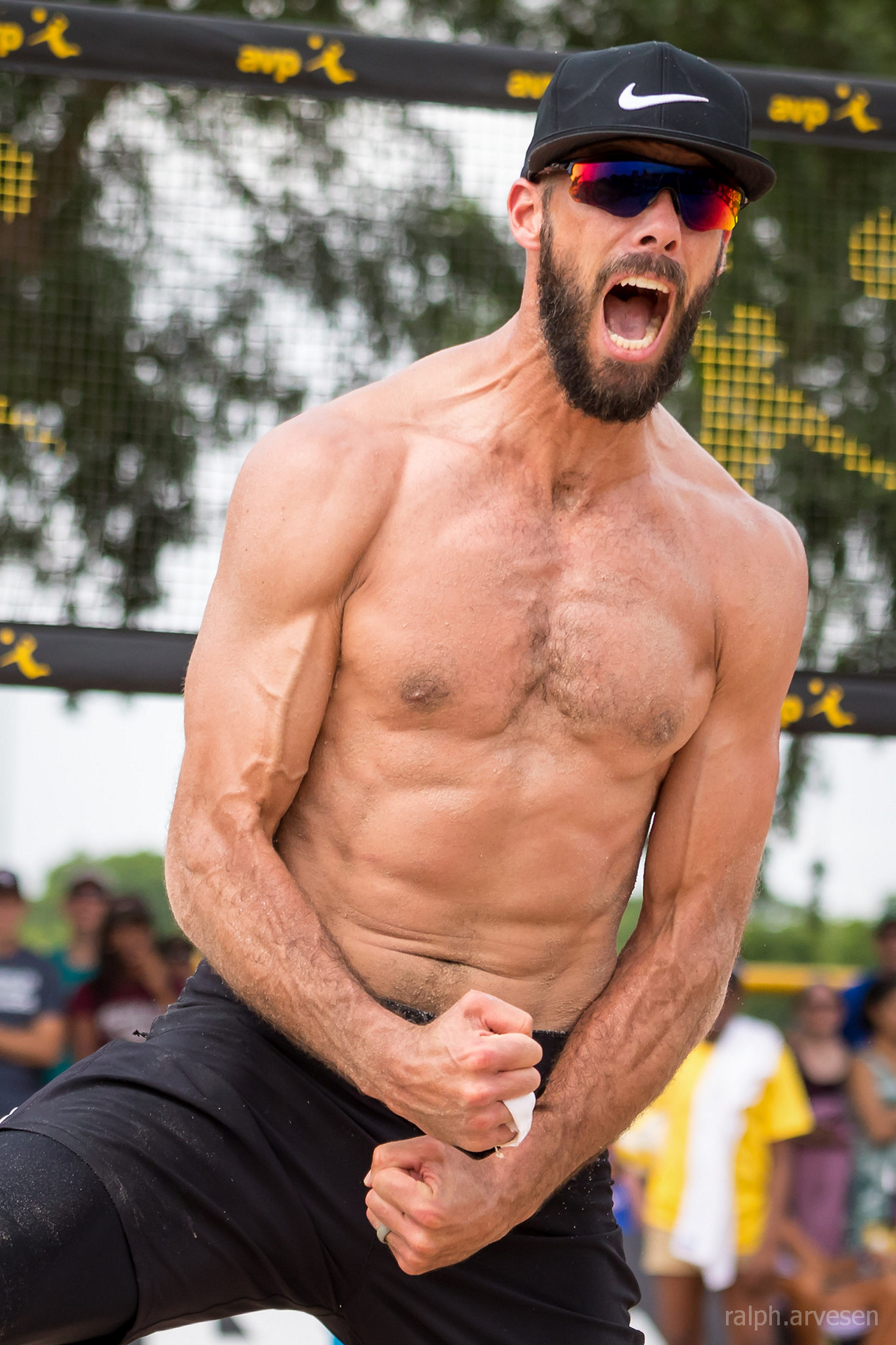
- Priddy at the 2017 AVP Austin Open

Personal information
- Full name: William Reid Priddy
- Nationality: American
- Born: October 1, 1977 (age 49); Richmond, Virginia, U.S.
- Height: 6 ft 4 in (194 cm)
- Weight: 196 lb (89 kg)
- Spike: 139 in (353 cm)
- Block: 130 in (330 cm)
- Education: Loyola Marymount University

Volleyball information
- Position: Outside hitter
- Current club: Volley Lube
- Number: 8

Career
Teams
- Olympiacos
- Halkbank Ankara
- Daejeon Samsung Bluefangs
- Zenit-Kazan
- Volley Lube

National team
1999–2016	United States
Medal record
Men's beach volleyball
Representing the United States
Olympic Games
Gold medal – first place	2008 Beijing	Team
Bronze medal – third place	2016 Rio de Janeiro	Team
World League
Gold medal – first place	2008 Rio de Janeiro
Silver medal – second place	2012 Sofia
Bronze medal – third place	2007 Katowice
World Tour
Silver medal – second place	2019 Kuala Lumpur	Beach

William Reid Priddy (born October 1, 1977), known as Reid Priddy, is an American volleyball player on the United States men's national volleyball team and Italian club Cucine Lube Civitanova. He has also played on the AVP tour from 2000 to 2006.

As of 2009, Priddy has resumed playing on the AVP Tour.

== High school and personal life ==
Priddy was born in Richmond, Virginia to Ken and Sharon Priddy. He started playing volleyball after his family moved from Richmond to Florida, where he tried it in a summer-school P.E. class.

Priddy graduated in 1996 from Mountain Pointe High School in Phoenix, Arizona. His first year of varsity volleyball was in Arizona in 1994. Priddy played the setter position for the Pride and helped lead the team as a junior to the school's first state championship in 1995.

Priddy has been married to Lindsay Pierce since March 10, 2007, and has two children Caden (2010) and Scarlett (2015).

== College ==
Priddy graduated from Loyola Marymount University with a degree in communication studies in 2000. He was also recruited by Cal State Northridge, USC and UC Santa Barbara. He appeared in 18 matches (42 games). Posted 150 kills, 70 digs and 12 service aces as a freshman. He led the Lions with 391 kills and in matches with 10-or-more kills (17) and was second on the team in kills per game (4.83), digs (178) and digs per game (2.20) in 1998. In 1999, he led the team in kills (435), kills per game (5.80) and service aces (35) as a senior

== Career ==
Priddy played with the national team at the Pan American Games in 1999. In 2000, he also debuted playing in Italy, for Volley Forlì. In 2001, Priddy led the team in kills (258) and digs (184), and was second on the team in blocks (41) and tied for third in service aces (14), participating in the Japan Tour, Volleyball World League, World Championship Qualifier, NORCECA Zone Championships, and the Jeep America's Cup. That year he also played for the Vienna Hotvolleys club in Austria.

Priddy rejoined the US team in late July 2002. He led the team in total points (70), kills (60) and blocks (eight) in six matches at the FIVB Volleyball Men's World Championship, and finished the season first on the team in points per game (2.98) and sixth in total points (173), had 92 kills, 66 digs, 21 blocks and 10 service aces. He also participated for the national team in the Bulgaria Tour, Greece Tour, and Florida Tour.

Priddy served as the team captain at the 2003 Pan American Games where the team placed fourth. Although battling an abdominal injury for much of the season, he still finished third on the team in kills (224) and fourth on the squad in service aces (17). He also participated in the Colorado/Nebraska Tour, Canada Tour, NORCECA Zone Championships (gold medal), and the World Cup (fourth place).

Team USA qualified for the 2004 Olympic Games in Athens, Greece, by winning the NORCECA Olympic Qualifying Tournament in Caguas, Puerto Rico. The team finished fourth overall at the Olympics. He also participated in the Japan Tour, Houston Series, USA Global Challenge (gold medal), and the Serbia and Montenegro Tour (silver medal). That year, he moved to Callipo Vibo Valentia club of southern Italy.

In 2005, he made his indoor season debut in Japan at the World Grand Champions Cup as the Team USA claimed the silver medal with a record of 4-1. He played in each of the final four matches (eight out of 13 sets) and scored 27 points on 23 kills, two blocks and two service aces. In 2005–2006 he played at club level in South Korea for Daejeon Samsung Bluefangs. The following year, Priddy led his team in scoring in seven out of 12 World League matches, including 21 points against Serbia & Montenegro, and was one of the World League leaders in scoring and hitting. The U.S. team went undefeated (4-0) at the Inaugural Pan American Cup in June. Priddy obtained the high score in the first (18), third (23) and fifth (16) matches in Argentina. At club level, in 2006–2007 he was hired by Olympiacos Piraeus in Greece, after which he moved to Russia club VC Lokomotiv Novosibirsk, where he remained until 2010.

In 2008, Priddy was part of the team which won the gold medal in the 2008 Summer Olympics defeating Brazil in final. After leaving Lokomotiv, in 2010–2012 Priddy played for Russian club VC Zenit-Kazan and then for Halkbank Ankara in Turkey (2012–2013). He returned to play for European clubs only in January 2016, when he was called to replace injured Simone Parodi by Lube Cucine Civitanova.

At the 2016 Olympics, during the bronze medal game, he came off the bench and helped rally the team to a 3-2 victory.

== AVP Beach Volleyball Tour ==
- 2001: Finished 13th twice, 17th three times, 25th twice, and 33rd once in 8 AVP tournaments.
- 2002:Finished 25th and 57th in 2 AVP tournaments.
- 2005: Finished ninth three times in 10 AVP tournaments.
- 2006: Finished ninth three times in 3 AVP tournaments.
- 2017: Finished third in Manhattan Beach Open [AVP.com]
- 2019: Won Manhattan Beach Open [AVP.com]

== Sporting achievements ==
=== Clubs ===
==== CEV Champions League ====
- 2014/2015 – with Cucine Lube Civitanova

=== Awards ===
Year	Award / Honor
1998	Earned AVCA second-team All-America honors Earned all-MPSF honorable mention accolades.
1999	Earned AVCA second-team All-America honors Garnered second-team all-Mountain Pacific Sports Federation (MPSF)honors.
2000	Earned American Volleyball Coaches Association first-team All-America honors as a senior
2013	Most Valuable Player of the Men's CEV Cup 2012–13 with Halkbank Ankara
