= Lidi Bessi Kama =

Togolese politician

Minister of Sports and Leisure
- Incumbent
- Assumed office 1 October 2020
- President: Faure Gnassingbé
- Prime Minister: Victoire Tomegah Dogbé

Personal details
- Born: 15 March 1979 (age 47) Lomé, Togo
- Education: University of Lomé
- Awards: Knight of the Order of Mono (2011)

Military service
- Allegiance: Togo
- Branch/service: Togolese Armed Forces
- Rank: Physician-commander

Lidi Kedjaka Bessi Kama-Gumedzoe (born 15 March 1979) is a Togolese handball administrator and physician who has served as Minister of Sports and Leisure since 2020. She has also served as a military physician and as a member of several sports governing body medical commissions, chairing those of the Togolese Handball Federation and International Handball Federation.

== Biography ==
Lidi Kedjaka Bessi Kama-Gumedzoe was born on 15 March 1979 in Lomé. She was educated at the Notre Dame des Apôtres College in Lomé, at Lycée de Tokoin (obtaining her baccalaureate in 1996), and at the Lomé Army Health Service School. She then graduated with a doctorate in medicine at the University of Lomé, where she got a specialist degree in pediatrics and child hygiene, before getting a specialist degree in sports medicine at the Université Félix Houphouët-Boigny.

After joining the Togolese National Olympic Committee Medical Commission in 2005, she was part of the 2008 Summer Olympics as Togo's closing ceremony flagbearer and an Olympic physician. After serving as Togo's representative in the Zone II and Zone III Regional Anti-Doping Organization in 2006, she served as president from 2015 to 2017. She has also chaired the Medical Commissions of the Togolese Handball Federation (in 2008) and International Handball Federation. She also joined the African Handball Confederation Medical Commission in 2009.

She is a doctor-commander in the Togolese Armed Forces, and is the country's first female paratrooper doctor. She has worked as a pediatrician at the Sylvanus Olympio University Hospital and as a teacher at the École nationale des auxiliaires médicaux. She was also Deputy Force Medical Officer of the United Nations Multidimensional Integrated Stabilization Mission in Mali from 2017 until 2018. She was a commissioner of the National Human Rights Commission of Togo from April 2019 to 2021.

On 1 October 2020, she became Minister of Sports and Leisure of Togo as part of Victoire Tomegah Dogbé's cabinet; she is the second woman to be Togo's sports minister, the first one being Angèle Bansah. She had assumed the position amidst the fallout from the COVID-19 pandemic in Togo.

She was made Knight of the Order of Mono in 2011.
