= Michele Baranowicz =

Italian–Polish volleyball player (born 1989)

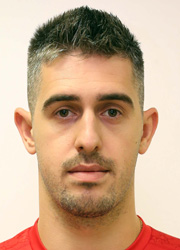

Personal information
- Born: 5 August 1989 (age 37); Mondovì, Italy
- Height: 1.96 m (6 ft 5 in)
- Weight: 93 kg (205 lb)
- Spike: 350 cm (138 in)
- Block: 328 cm (129 in)

Volleyball information
- Position: Setter
- Current club: Cisterna Volley
- Number: 17

Career
Years	Teams
2005–2008; 2008–2010; 2010–2011; 2011–2012; 2012–2013; 2013–2015; 2015–2017; 2017–2018; 2018–2019; 2019–2020; 2020–2021; 2021–2023; 2023; 2023-	Piemonte Volley; Samgas Crema; Asseco Resovia; Piemonte Volley; Modena Volley; Volley Lube; Verona Volley; Volley Piacenza; Halkbank Ankara; Volley Callipo; Gas Sales Piacenza; Top Volley Cisterna; Hebar Pazardzhik; Cisterna Volley

National team
2011–	Italy
Honours
Representing Italy
Men's Volleyball
FIVB World Grand Champions Cup
Bronze medal – third place	2013 Japan
FIVB World League
Bronze medal – third place	2014 Florence

Michele Baranowicz (Polish: Michał Baranowicz) (born 5 August 1989) is an Italian professional volleyball player of Polish descent who plays as setter for Top Volley Cisterna. He was part of the Italy national team in the past.

== Personal life ==
Michele Baranowicz was born as Michał Baranowicz. He is a son of a former Polish volleyball player Wojciech Baranowicz.

== Career ==
=== Club ===
In season 2010/2011 was a player of Asseco Resovia Rzeszów and won bronze medal of Polish Championship. In 2011 moved to Bre Banca Lannutti Cuneo. After one season moved to Casa Modena. He spent in this club one season. Since 2013 has been playing for Lube Banca Macerata. In 2014 won a title of Italian Champion after winning matches against Sir Safety Perugia.

== Honours ==
- CEV Challenge Cup
  - 2015–16 – with Calzedonia Verona
- Domestic
  - 2005–06 Italian Cup, with Bre Banca Lannutti Cuneo
  - 2013–14 Italian Championship, with Cucine Lube Banca Marche Macerata
  - 2014–15 Italian SuperCup, with Cucine Lube Banca Marche Treia
  - 2018–19 Turkish SuperCup, with Halkbank Ankara
