= Danger Quintana =

Cuban volleyball player (born 1994)

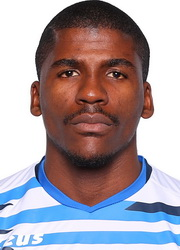

Personal information
- Full name: Danger Jorber Quintana Guerra
- Born: 19 May 1994 (age 32); Cuba
- Height: 200 cm (6 ft 7 in)
- Weight: 95 kg (209 lb)
- Spike: 343 cm (135 in)
- Block: 323 cm (127 in)

Volleyball information
- Position: Middle blocker
- Current club: Minas Tênis Clube
- Number: 2

Career
Years	Teams
2016–2017; 2017-	Ciudad Habana; Top Volley Latina; Minas Tênis Clube

National team
2010–2014	Cuba
Honours
Representing Cuba
Men's volleyball
World League
Bronze medal – third place	2012 Sofia
NORCECA Championship
Bronze medal – third place	2013
- Last updated: 9 February 2017

Danger Jorber Quintana Guerra (born 19 May 1994) is a former Cuban male volleyball player. He was part of the Cuba men's national volleyball team. On club level he played for La Habana.
