= 2012 Men's Pan-American Volleyball Cup =

Tournament details
- Host country: Dominican Republic
- Dates: July 9 – 14
- Teams: 8
- Venue: Palacio del Voleibol (in Santo Domingo host cities)

Final positions
- Champions: United States (5th title)

Tournament awards
- MVP: Taylor Sander (USA)

The 2012 Pan-American Volleyball Cup was the seventh edition of the annual men's volleyball tournament, played by eight countries over July, 2012 in Santo Domingo, Dominican Republic. The event served as a qualifier for the 2013 FIVB Volleyball World League qualification.

The United States won the tournament for the fifth time after beating Argentina 3–0 in the final.

Dominican Republic earned the right to play in the 2013 FIVB Volleyball World League qualification finishing third after United States and Argentina who are already qualified to the 2013 FIVB Volleyball World League

== Competing nations ==
Group A	Group B
Argentina; Canada; Dominican Republic; Trinidad and Tobago	Brazil; Mexico; United States; Venezuela

== Pool standing procedure ==
Match won 3–0: 5 points for the winner, 0 point for the loser
Match won 3–1: 4 points for the winner, 1 points for the loser
Match won 3–2: 3 points for the winner, 2 points for the loser
In case of tie, the teams were classified according to the following criteria:
points ratio and sets ratio

== Preliminary round ==
- Venue: Palacio del Voleibol, Santo Domingo, Dominican Republic
- All times are Atlantic Time Zone (UTC−04:00).

=== Group A ===
Pos	Team	Pld	W	L	Pts	SPW	SPL	SPR	SW	SL	SR	Qualification
1	Argentina	3	3	0	10	311	271	1.148	9	5	1.800	Semifinals
2	Dominican Republic	3	2	1	12	258	226	1.142	8	3	2.667	Quarterfinals
3	Canada	3	1	2	7	238	241	0.988	5	6	0.833	Quarterfinals
4	Trinidad and Tobago	3	0	3	1	185	254	0.728	1	9	0.111	5-8th playoffs

Date	Time		Score		Set 1	Set 2	Set 3	Set 4	Set 5	Total	Report
9 July	13:00	Argentina	3–2	Canada	25–20	17–25	23–25	25–19	16–14	106–103	Report
9 July	19:00	Dominican Republic	3–0	Trinidad and Tobago	25–13	25–19	30–28			80–60	Report
10 July	13:00	Argentina	3–1	Trinidad and Tobago	25–10	25–18	24–26	25–11		99–65	Report
10 July	19:00	Dominican Republic	3–0	Canada	25–23	25–20	25–17			75–60	Report
11 July	15:00	Canada	3–0	Trinidad and Tobago	25–15	25–22	25–23			75–60	Report
11 July	19:00	Dominican Republic	2–3	Argentina	25–21	23–25	17–25	25–20	13–15	103–106	Report

=== Group B ===
Pos	Team	Pld	W	L	Pts	SPW	SPL	SPR	SW	SL	SR	Qualification
1	United States	3	3	0	14	247	180	1.372	9	1	9.000	Semifinals
2	Brazil	3	2	1	11	240	194	1.237	7	3	2.333	Quarterfinals
3	Mexico	3	1	2	5	163	215	0.758	3	6	0.500	Quarterfinals
4	Venezuela	3	0	3	0	164	225	0.729	0	9	0.000	5-8th playoffs

Date	Time		Score		Set 1	Set 2	Set 3	Set 4	Set 5	Total	Report
9 July	15:00	Brazil	3–0	Mexico	25–15	25–15	25–16			75–46	Report
9 July	17:00	United States	3–0	Venezuela	25–17	25–19	25–12			75–48	Report
10 July	15:00	United States	3–0	Mexico	25–8	25–16	25–18			75–42	Report
10 July	17:00	Brazil	3–0	Venezuela	25–20	25–15	25–16			75–51	Report
11 July	13:00	Venezuela	0–3	Mexico	21–25	21–25	23–25			65–75	Report
11 July	17:00	Brazil	1–3	United States	25–22	23–25	20–25	22–25		90–97	Report

== Final round ==
=== Championship bracket ===
Quarterfinals
A2	Dominican Republic	3
B3	Mexico	1
B2	Brazil	3
A3	Canada	1

Semifinals
B1	United States	3
A2	Dominican Republic	2
A1	Argentina	3
B2	Brazil	2

Finals
B1	United States	3
A1	Argentina	0
Third place
A2	Dominican Republic	3
B2	Brazil	2

=== 5th–8th places bracket ===
Classification 5–8
A4	Trinidad and Tobago	0
B3	Mexico	3
B4	Venezuela	0
A3	Canada	3

Classification 5–6
B3	Mexico	3
A3	Canada	2
Classification 7–8
A4	Trinidad and Tobago	2
B4	Venezuela	3

==== Quarterfinals ====
Date	Time		Score		Set 1	Set 2	Set 3	Set 4	Set 5	Total	Report
12 July	17:00	Brazil	3–1	Canada	23–25	25–16	25–18	25–13		98–72	Report
12 July	19:00	Dominican Republic	3–1	Mexico	23–25	25–19	25–21	30–28		103–93	Report

==== Classification 5–8 ====
Date	Time		Score		Set 1	Set 2	Set 3	Set 4	Set 5	Total	Report
13 July	13:00	Trinidad and Tobago	0–3	Mexico	19–25	14–25	14–25			47–75	Report
13 July	15:00	Venezuela	0–3	Canada	18–25	26–28	20–25			64–78	Report

==== Semifinals ====
Date	Time		Score		Set 1	Set 2	Set 3	Set 4	Set 5	Total	Report
13 July	17:00	Argentina	3–2	Brazil	25–20	25–17	25–27	18–25	15–13	108–102	Report
13 July	19:00	United States	3–2	Dominican Republic	25–21	23–25	25–22	25–27	15–12	113–107	Report

==== Classification 7–8 ====
Date	Time		Score		Set 1	Set 2	Set 3	Set 4	Set 5	Total	Report
14 July	13:00	Trinidad and Tobago	2–3	Venezuela	25–27	25–18	20–25	27–25	13–15	110–110	Report

==== Classification 5–6 ====
Date	Time		Score		Set 1	Set 2	Set 3	Set 4	Set 5	Total	Report
14 July	15:00	Mexico	3–2	Canada	25–17	22–25	25–22	18–25	15–13	105–102	Report

==== Classification 3–4 ====
Date	Time		Score		Set 1	Set 2	Set 3	Set 4	Set 5	Total	Report
14 July	17:00	Dominican Republic	3–2	Brazil	28–26	25–23	21–25	24–26	15–11	113–111	Report

==== Final ====
Date	Time		Score		Set 1	Set 2	Set 3	Set 4	Set 5	Total	Report
14 July	20:00	Argentina	0–3	United States	27–29	20–25	11–25			58–79	Report

== Final standing ==
Rank	Team
1st place, gold medalist(s)	United States
2nd place, silver medalist(s)	Argentina
3rd place, bronze medalist(s)	Dominican Republic
4	Brazil
5	Mexico
6	Canada
7	Venezuela
8	Trinidad and Tobago

2012 Men's Pan-American Cup
champions

United States
Fifth title

12–man roster
Davis, Rawson, Clark, Muagututia, Troy, DeFault, McDonnell, Ciarelli, Ammerman, Watten, Sander, Shoji
Head coach
Patchell

- Dominican Republic qualified for the 2013 FIVB Volleyball World League qualification.

== Awards ==
- MVP: (United States) Taylor Sander
- Best scorer: (Dominican Republic) José Miguel Cáceres
- Best spiker: (United States) Antonio Ciarelli
- Best blocker: (Trinidad and Tobago) Marc-Anthony Honoré
- Best server: (Dominican Republic) Elvis Contreras
- Best digger: (United States) Dustin Watten
- Best setter: (Mexico) Pedro Rangel
- Best receiver: (Dominican Republic) Elvis Contreras
- Best libero: (Dominican Republic) Edwin Peguero
