= Adriano Paolucci =

Italian volleyball player (born 1979)

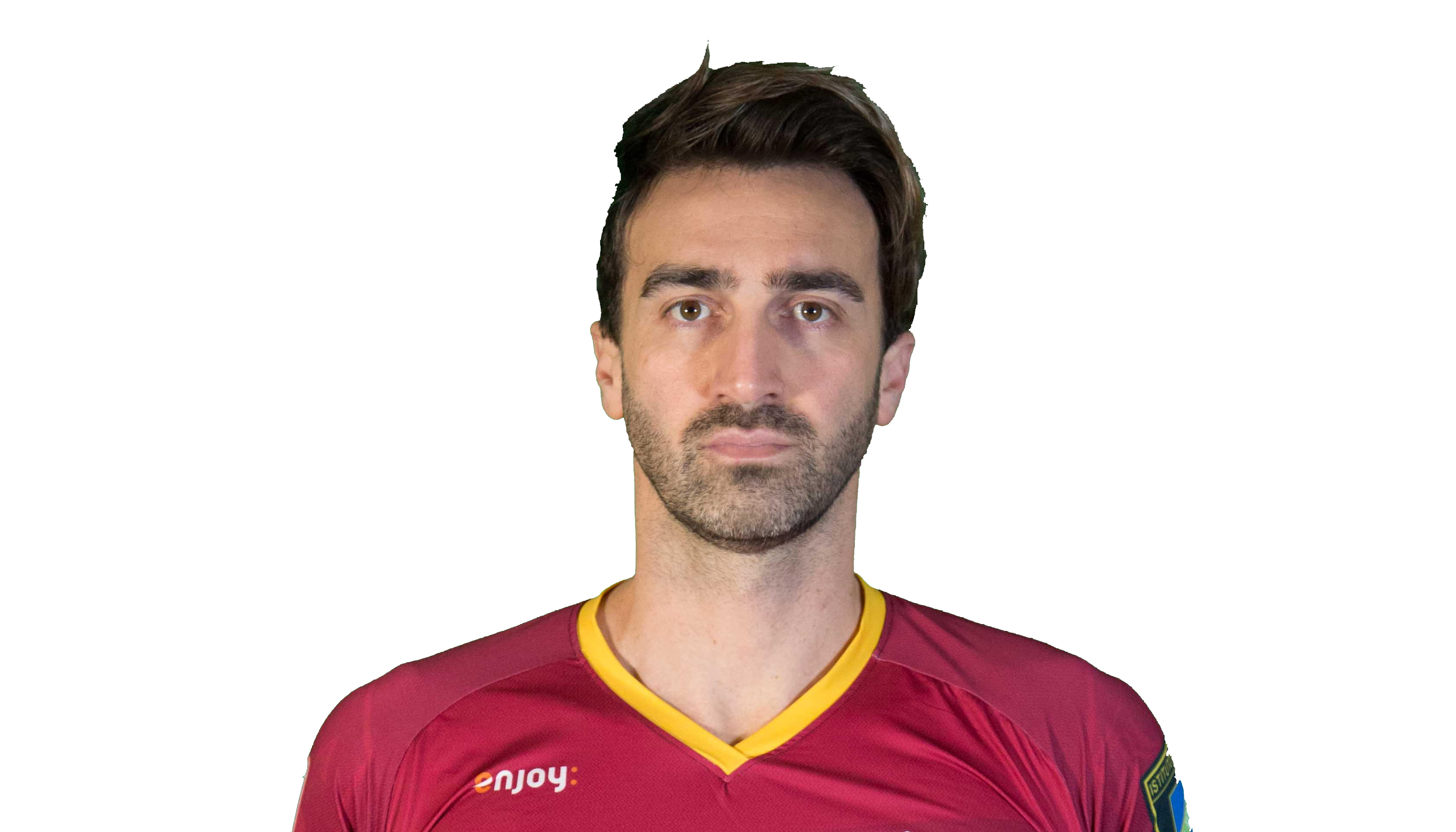

Personal information
- Nationality: Italian
- Born: 11 February 1979 (age 47)
- Height: 190 cm (6 ft 3 in)
- Weight: 84 kg (185 lb)
- Spike: 310 cm (122 in)
- Block: 290 cm (114 in)

Volleyball information
- Number: 5 (national team)

Career
Years	Teams
2015	Sir Safety Umbria Volley

National team
2015	Italy

Adriano Paolucci (born 11 February 1979) is an Italian male volleyball player. He is part of the Italy men's national volleyball team. On club level he plays for Sir Safety Umbria Volley.
