= Aidan Zingel =

Australian volleyball player (born 1990)

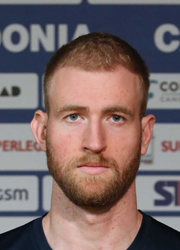

Personal information
- Nationality: Australian
- Born: 19 November 1990 (age 35); Kiama, New South Wales
- Height: 2.07 m (6 ft 9 in)
- Weight: 100 kg (220 lb)
- Spike: 361 cm (142 in)
- Block: 346 cm (136 in)

Volleyball information
- Position: Middle blocker
- Current club: Top Volley Cisterna
- Number: 1

Career
Years	Teams
2009–2010; 2010–2017; 2017–2018; 2018–2019; 2019–2020; 2020–2021; 2021–	(Sweden) Linköping VC (Italy) Calzedonia Verona (Italy) Diatec Trentino (Italy) BCC Castellana Grotte (Italy) Conad Reggio Emilia (Italy) NBV Verona (Italy) Top Volley Cisterna

National team
2009–2016	Australia

Aidan Zingel (born 19 November 1990 in Kiama, New South Wales) is an Australian volleyball player. He competed for Australia at the 2012 Summer Olympics.

Aidan first started playing volleyball in 2005, when he was offered an AIS (Australian Institute of Sport) scholarship at the age of 15. At the end of 2005, he moved to Canberra to train full-time with the Australian Youth and Junior Programs. At the age of 18, he was selected for the Senior National Team. Aidan's first professional contract was in 2009 with Linkoping Volleyball Club, winning the Swedish Championship in that season. The next club he played for was Marmi Lanza Verona in A1, playing there for four years. He participated in the 2010 World Championships, as well as the 2012 Summer Olympics. He was named as “Australian Player of the Year” He played in the BluVolley Verona, from Italy. He was the Captain of the Volleyball Australia Men's Team from 6 September 2013 to 14 May 2015. He is 207 cm tall.
