= Giacomo Bellei =

Italian volleyball player (born 1988)

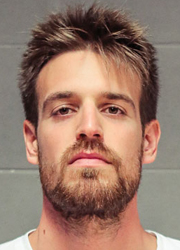

Personal information
- Nationality: Italian
- Born: 7 February 1988 (age 38); Zevio
- Height: 6 ft 8 in (2.02 m)
- Weight: 185 lb (84 kg)
- Spike: 130 in (340 cm)
- Block: 130 in (320 cm)

Volleyball information
- Position: Opposite
- Current club: (Italy) Conad Reggio Emilia
- Number: 3

Career
Years	Teams
2006-2007; 2007-2008; 2008-2009; 2009-2010; 2010-2011; 2011-2012; 2012-2013; 2013-2016; 2016-2017; 2017-2018; 2018-	(Italy) Lube Banca Marche Macerata (Italy) Marmi Lanza Verona (Italy) Acqua Paradiso Gabeca Montichiari (Italy) Pallavolo Chieti (Italy) Volley Forlì (Italy) Casa Modena (Italy) CMC Ravenna (Italy) Calzedonia Verona (Italy) Materdomini Volley Castellana Grotte (Italy) Atlantide Pallavolo Brescia (Italy) Conad Reggio Emilia

Giacomo Bellei (born 7 February 1988) is an Italian volleyball player. Since the 2018/2019 season, he has played for Conad Reggio Emilia.

== Sporting achievements ==
=== Clubs ===
Italian SuperCup:

- 2006

CEV Challenge Cup:

- 2016

=== National team ===
Junior European Championship:

- 2006
