= François Lecat =

Belgian volleyball player (born 1993)

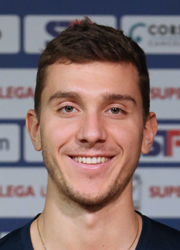
- Lecat in 2017

Personal information
- Nationality: Belgian
- Born: 19 April 1993 (age 33)
- Height: 2.00 m (6 ft 7 in)
- Weight: 96 kg (212 lb)
- Spike: 347 cm (137 in)
- Block: 320 cm (126 in)

Volleyball information
- Position: Right side hitter
- Current club: Narbonne Volley
- Number: 5

Career
Teams
	Noliko Maaseik; BluVolley Verona

National team
2014–	Belgium

François Lecat (born 19 April 1993) is a Belgian male volleyball player. He is part of the Belgium men's national volleyball team. He competed at the 2015 European Games in Baku. On club level, he plays for BluVolley Verona.
