= Saša Starović =

Serbian volleyball player (born 1988)

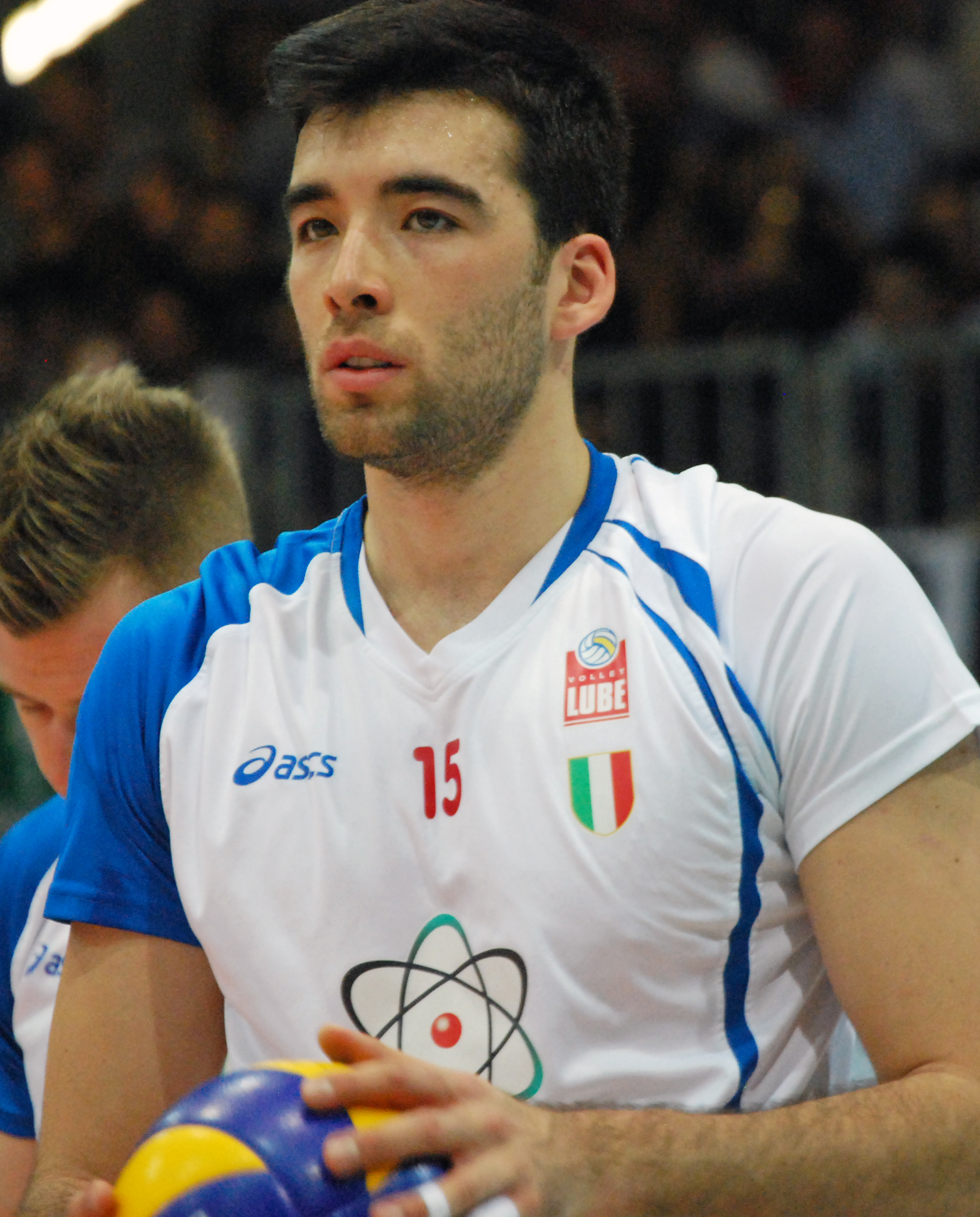

Personal information
- Full name: Saša Starović
- Born: 19 October 1988 (age 38); Trebinje, SR Bosnia-Herzegovina, SFR Yugoslavia
- Height: 2.07 m (6 ft 9 in)
- Weight: 89 kg (196 lb)
- Spike: 335 cm (132 in)
- Block: 321 cm (126 in)

Volleyball information
- Position: Opposite

Career
Years	Teams
2005–2006; 2006–2009; 2009–2010; 2010–2011; 2011–2012; 2012–2014; 2014–2015; 2015–2016; 2016–2017; 2017; 2017–2018; 2018–2019; 2019–2020; 2020–2021	OK Gacko; Budvanska Rivijera Budva; Ural Ufa; Andreoli Latina; Umbria Volley; Lube Banca Macerata; Andreoli Latina; Calzedonia Verona; Revivre Milano; PAOK Thessaloniki; Taiwan Excellence Latina; Yaroslavich Yaroslavl; Panathinaikos; Tourcoing Lille Métropole

National team
2007–2015	Serbia
Honours
Men's volleyball
Representing Serbia
World Championship
Bronze medal – third place	2010 Italy
European Championship
Gold medal – first place	2011 Austria / Czech Republic
Bronze medal – third place	2007 Russia
Bronze medal – third place	2013 Denmark / Poland
World League
Silver medal – second place	2008 Rio de Janeiro
Silver medal – second place	2009 Belgrade
Silver medal – second place	2015 Rio de Janeiro
Bronze medal – third place	2010 Cordoba
- Last updated: 6 October 2017

Saša Starović (Serbian Cyrillic: Саша Старовић; born 19 October 1988) is a Serbian retired volleyball player, a former member of Serbia men's national volleyball team, a participant of the Olympic Games (Beijing 2008, London 2012), European Champion 2011, bronze medalist of World Championship 2010, medalist of the European Championship and the World League.

== Personal life ==
His sister, Sanja Starović is also a volleyball player.

== Career ==
=== National team ===
On 19 July 2015 Serbian national team with him in squad went to the final of World League, but they lost with France 0–3 and achieved silver medal.

== Sporting achievements ==
=== Clubs ===
==== National championships ====
- 2013/2014 Italian Championship, with Lube Banca Macerata
- 2016/2017 Greek Championship, with PAOK Thessaloniki
- 2019/2020 Greek Championship, with Panathinaikos

==== National competitions ====
- 2019/2020 Greek League Cup, with Panathinaikos

==== European championships ====
- 2015/2016 CEV Challenge Cup, with Calzedonia Verona

=== National team ===
- 2007 CEV European Championship
- 2008 FIVB World League
- 2009 FIVB World League
- 2010 FIVB World League
- 2010 FIVB World Championship
- 2011 CEV European Championship
- 2013 CEV European Championship
- 2015 FIVB World League

=== Individually ===
- 2009 Memorial of Hubert Jerzy Wagner - Best Server
- 2011 Serie A1 League - Most Valuable Player

== See also ==
- Summer Olympics national flag bearers
