= 2012–13 CEV Cup =

- League: CEV Cup
- Sport: Volleyball
- Duration: 22 October 2012 – 3 March 2013

Finals
- Champions: (Turkey) Halkbank Ankara
- Runners-up: (Italy) Andreoli Latina
- Finals MVP: (United States) William Reid Priddy (ANK)

CEV Cup seasons
- ← 2011–12 2013–14 →

The 2012–13 CEV Cup was the 41st edition of the European CEV Cup volleyball club tournament.

Turkish club Halkbank Ankara beat Italian Andreoli Latina in the finale. American player William Reid Priddy was Most Valuable Player of the tournament.

== Participating teams ==
Country	Number of teams	Teams
Austria	1	Posojilnica Aich/Dob
Belgium	1 +1	Precura Schelde-Natie Antwerpen, Knack Randstad Roeselare
Bosnia and Herzegovina	1	Kakanj Kakanj
Bulgaria	2	CSKA Sofia, Levski Sofia
Croatia	1	Mladost Marina Kastela
Cyprus	2	Anorthosis Famagusta, Pokka AE Karava
Czech Republic	0 +1	Jihostroj České Budějovice
Estonia	1	Selver Tallinn
Finland	2	VaLePa Sastamala, Isku Tampere
France	2 +1	Rennes Volley 35, AS Cannes, Tours VB
Germany	0 +1	Generali Unterhaching
Greece	2	Aris Thessaloniki, Gas Pamvohaikos Vrahati
Israel	1	Maccabi Tel Aviv
Italy	1	Andreoli Latina
Netherlands	2	Orion Doetinchem, Landstede Zwolle
Poland	2	Jastrzębski Węgiel, Delecta Bydgoszcz
Romania	1	Dinamo București
Russia	1	Iskra Odintsovo
Serbia	1	Vojvodina NS Seme Novi Sad
Slovakia	1	Chemes Humenné
Slovenia	1	Calcit Kamnik
Switzerland	2	Volley Amriswil, Chênois Genève
Turkey	2	Maliye Milli Piyango Ankara, Halkbank Ankara
Ukraine	2	Crimsoda Krasnoperekopsk, Lokomotyv Kharkiv

== Main phase ==
=== 16th Finals ===
The 16 winning teams from the 1/16 Finals competed in the 1/8 Finals playing Home & Away matches. The losers of the 1/16 Final matches qualified for the 3rd round in Challenge Cup.

Team 1	Agg.	Team 2	1st leg	2nd leg	Golden Set
CSKA Sofia (Bulgaria)	1–6	(Italy) Andreoli Latina	0–3	1–3	
Selver Tallinn (Estonia)	3–5	(Finland) VaLePa Sastamala	3–2	0–3	10–15
Calcit Kamnik (Slovenia)	4–4	(Switzerland) Volley Amriswil	3–1	1–3	15–11
Posojilnica Aich/Dob (Austria)	6–2	(Bosnia and Herzegovina) Kakanj Kakanj	3–0	3–2	
Aris Thessaloniki (Greece)	5–3	(Belgium) Precura Schelde-N. Antwerpen	3–0	2–3	13–15
Levski Sofia (Bulgaria)	3–4	(Finland) Isku Tampere	3–1	0–3	5–15
Maliye Milli Piyango Ankara (Turkey)	6–0	(Netherlands) Orion Doetinchem	3–0	3–0	
Jastrzębski Węgiel (Poland)	6–0	(France) Rennes Volley 35	3–0	3–0	
Iskra Odintsovo (Russia)	6–0	(Israel) Maccabi Tel Aviv	3–0	3–0	
Chênois Genève (Switzerland)	1–6	(Ukraine) Crimsoda Krasnoperekopsk	0–3	1–3	
Dinamo București (Romania)	2–6	(Netherlands) Landstede Zwolle	0–3	2–3	
Delecta Bydgoszcz (Poland)	5–3	(Turkey) Halkbank Ankara	3–0	2–3	8–15
Pokka AE Karava (Cyprus)	3–5	(France) AS Cannes	0–3	3–2	
Vojvodina NS Seme Novi Sad (Serbia)	0–6	(Ukraine) Lokomotyv Kharkiv	0–3	0–3	
Mladost Marina Kastela (Croatia)	4–3	(Cyprus) Anorthosis Famagusta	3–0	1–3	13–15
Chemes Humenné (Slovakia)	5–5	(Greece) Gas Pamvohaikos Vrahati	2–3	3–2	9–15

==== First leg ====
Date	Time		Score		Set 1	Set 2	Set 3	Set 4	Set 5	Total	Report
24 Oct	19:00	CSKA Sofia (Bulgaria)	0–3	(Italy) Andreoli Latina	17–25	14–25	21–25			52–75	Report
25 Oct	20:05	Selver Tallinn (Estonia)	3–2	(Finland) VaLePa Sastamala	25–22	21–25	22–25	25–22	15–13	108–107	Report
24 Oct	18:00	Calcit Kamnik (Slovenia)	3–1	(Switzerland) Volley Amriswil	25–14	25–18	23–25	25–21		98–78	Report
24 Oct	19:00	Posojilnica Aich/Dob (Austria)	3–0	(Bosnia and Herzegovina) Kakanj Kakanj	25–17	25–16	25–17			75–50	Report
24 Oct	19:30	Aris Thessaloniki (Greece)	3–0	(Belgium) Precura Schelde-N. Antwerpen	25–17	25–21	25–23			75–61	Report
25 Oct	18:00	Levski Sofia (Bulgaria)	3–1	(Finland) Isku Tampere	25–16	26–24	20–25	25–16		96–81	Report
24 Oct	17:00	Maliye Milli Piyango Ankara (Turkey)	3–0	(Netherlands) Orion Doetinchem	27–25	25–22	25–19			77–66	Report
24 Oct	18:00	Jastrzębski Węgiel (Poland)	3–0	(France) Rennes Volley 35	25–22	25–23	30–28			80–73	Report
23 Oct	19:00	Iskra Odintsovo (Russia)	3–0	(Israel) Maccabi Tel Aviv	25–12	25–16	25–11			75–39	Report
24 Oct	20:00	Chênois Genève (Switzerland)	0–3	(Ukraine) Crimsoda Krasnoperekopsk	18–25	14–25	19–25			51–75	Report
23 Oct	17:00	Dinamo București (Romania)	0–3	(Netherlands) Landstede Zwolle	32–34	24–26	20–25			76–85	Report
24 Oct	18:00	Delecta Bydgoszcz (Poland)	3–0	(Turkey) Halkbank Ankara	25–22	25–22	29–27			79–71	Report
23 Oct	20:00	Pokka AE Karava (Cyprus)	0–3	(France) AS Cannes	23–25	21–25	22–25			66–75	Report
23 Oct	18:30	Vojvodina NS Seme Novi Sad (Serbia)	0–3	(Ukraine) Lokomotyv Kharkiv	13–25	23–25	17–25			53–75	Report
24 Oct	19:00	Mladost Marina Kastela (Croatia)	3–0	(Cyprus) Anorthosis Famagusta	25–22	25–17	25–22			75–61	Report
24 Oct	18:00	Chemes Humenné (Slovakia)	2–3	(Greece) Gas Pamvohaikos Vrahati	25–18	23–25	25–12	22–25	13–15	108–95	Report

==== Second leg ====
Date	Time		Score		Set 1	Set 2	Set 3	Set 4	Set 5	Total	Report
1 Nov	18:00	Andreoli Latina (Italy)	3–1	(Bulgaria) CSKA Sofia	25–16	25–15	23–25	25–21		98–77	Report
1 Nov	18:30	VaLePa Sastamala (Finland)	3–0	(Estonia) Selver Tallinn	25–18	25–17	25–14			75–49	Report
Golden set		VaLePa Sastamala (Finland)	15–10	(Estonia) Selver Tallinn							
1 Nov	19:30	Volley Amriswil (Switzerland)	3–1	(Slovenia) Calcit Kamnik	25–16	25–17	18–25	25–19		93–77	Report
Golden set		Volley Amriswil (Switzerland)	11–15	(Slovenia) Calcit Kamnik							
31 Oct	18:00	Kakanj Kakanj (Bosnia and Herzegovina)	2–3	(Austria) Posojilnica Aich/Dob	21–25	25–20	18–25	28–26	13–15	105–111	Report
31 Oct	20:30	Precura Schelde-N. Antwerpen (Belgium)	3–2	(Greece) Aris Thessaloniki	23–25	25–13	22–25	25–21	23–21	118–105	Report
Golden set		Precura Schelde-N. Antwerpen (Belgium)	15–13	(Greece) Aris Thessaloniki							
31 Oct	18:30	Isku Tampere (Finland)	3–0	(Bulgaria) Levski Sofia	25–15	25–17	25–14			75–46	Report
Golden set		Isku Tampere (Finland)	15–5	(Bulgaria) Levski Sofia							
31 Oct	19:30	Orion Doetinchem (Netherlands)	0–3	(Turkey) Maliye Milli Piyango Ankara	30–32	21–25	18–25			69–82	Report
31 Oct	20:00	Rennes Volley 35 (France)	0–3	(Poland) Jastrzębski Węgiel	15–25	23–25	23–25			61–75	Report
30 Oct	19:30	Maccabi Tel Aviv (Israel)	0–3	(Russia) Iskra Odintsovo	21–25	15–25	21–25			57–75	Report
30 Oct	16:00	Crimsoda Krasnoperekopsk (Ukraine)	3–1	(Switzerland) Chênois Genève	25–18	25–22	20–25	25–23		95–88	Report
31 Oct	20:00	Landstede Zwolle (Netherlands)	3–2	(Romania) Dinamo București	25–23	25–22	26–28	21–25	19–17	116–115	Report
1 Nov	18:00	Halkbank Ankara (Turkey)	3–2	(Poland) Delecta Bydgoszcz	25–21	25–22	21–25	18–25	16–14	105–107	Report
Golden set		Halkbank Ankara (Turkey)	15–8	(Poland) Delecta Bydgoszcz							
31 Oct	20:00	AS Cannes (France)	3–2	(Cyprus) Pokka AE Karava	25–18	25–22	14–25	24–26	15–8	103–99	Report
31 Oct	18:00	Lokomotyv Kharkiv (Ukraine)	3–0	(Serbia) Vojvodina NS Seme Novi Sad	25–21	25–11	25–11			75–43	Report
30 Oct	20:00	Anorthosis Famagusta (Cyprus)	3–1	(Croatia) Mladost Marina Kastela	16–25	25–18	25–16	25–21		91–80	Report
Golden set		Anorthosis Famagusta (Cyprus)	15–13	(Croatia) Mladost Marina Kastela							
27 Oct	19:00	Gas Pamvohaikos Vrahati (Greece)	2–3	(Slovakia) Chemes Humenné	25–23	22–25	31–33	25–20	13–15	116–116	Report
Golden set		Gas Pamvohaikos Vrahati (Greece)	15–9	(Slovakia) Chemes Humenné							

=== 8th Finals ===
Team 1	Agg.	Team 2	1st leg	2nd leg	Golden Set
VaLePa Sastamala (Finland)	3–4	(Italy) Andreoli Latina	3–1	0–3	11–15
Calcit Kamnik (Slovenia)	3–5	(Austria) Posojilnica Aich/Dob	3–2	0–3	9–15
Isku Tampere (Finland)	0–6	(Belgium) Precura Schelde-N. Antwerpen	0–3	0–3	
Maliye Milli Piyango Ankara (Turkey)	4–4	(Poland) Jastrzębski Węgiel	1–3	3–1	15–8
Crimsoda Krasnoperekopsk (Ukraine)	1–6	(Russia) Iskra Odintsovo	0–3	1–3	
Halkbank Ankara (Turkey)	6–0	(Netherlands) Landstede Zwolle	3–0	3–0	
AS Cannes (France)	3–6	(Ukraine) Lokomotyv Kharkiv	2–3	1–3	
Anorthosis Famagusta (Cyprus)	0–6	(Greece) Gas Pamvohaikos Vrahati	0–3	0–3	

==== First leg ====
Date	Time		Score		Set 1	Set 2	Set 3	Set 4	Set 5	Total	Report
14 Nov	18:30	VaLePa Sastamala (Finland)	3–1	(Italy) Andreoli Latina	26–24	25–19	23–25	25–20		99–88	Report
14 Nov	18:00	Calcit Kamnik (Slovenia)	3–2	(Austria) Posojilnica Aich/Dob	25–21	24–26	25–21	20–25	15–11	109–104	Report
15 Nov	18:30	Isku Tampere (Finland)	0–3	(Belgium) Precura Schelde-Natie Antwerpen	20–25	20–25	23–25			63–75	Report
14 Nov	15:00	Maliye Milli Piyango Ankara (Turkey)	1–3	(Poland) Jastrzębski Węgiel	15–25	14–25	26–24	17–25		72–99	Report
13 Nov	16:00	Crimsoda Krasnoperekopsk (Ukraine)	0–3	(Russia) Iskra Odintsovo	18–25	23–25	18–25			59–75	Report
13 Nov	19:00	Halkbank Ankara (Turkey)	3–0	(Netherlands) Landstede Zwolle	25–18	25–23	25–20			75–61	Report
13 Nov	20:00	AS Cannes (France)	2–3	(Ukraine) Lokomotyv Kharkiv	22–25	25–18	27–25	24–26	9–15	107–109	Report
15 Nov	20:00	Anorthosis Famagusta (Cyprus)	0–3	(Greece) Gas Pamvohaikos Vrahati	18–25	25–27	20–25			63–77	Report

==== Second leg ====
Date	Time		Score		Set 1	Set 2	Set 3	Set 4	Set 5	Total	Report
21 Nov	20:30	Andreoli Latina (Italy)	3–0	(Finland) VaLePa Sastamala	25–17	26–24	25–15			76–56	Report
Golden set		Andreoli Latina (Italy)	15–11	(Finland) VaLePa Sastamala							
21 Nov	19:00	Posojilnica Aich/Dob (Austria)	3–0	(Slovenia) Calcit Kamnik	25–18	25–12	25–15			75–45	Report
Golden set		Posojilnica Aich/Dob (Austria)	15–9	(Slovenia) Calcit Kamnik							
20 Nov	20:30	Precura Schelde-Natie Antwerpen (Belgium)	3–0	(Finland) Isku Tampere	25–23	25–11	25–16			75–50	Report
21 Nov	18:00	Jastrzębski Węgiel (Poland)	1–3	(Turkey) Maliye Milli Piyango Ankara	25–15	26–28	21–25	21–25		93–93	Report
Golden set		Jastrzębski Węgiel (Poland)	8–15	(Turkey) Maliye Milli Piyango Ankara							
21 Nov	19:00	Iskra Odintsovo (Russia)	3–1	(Ukraine) Crimsoda Krasnoperekopsk	25–17	22–25	25–10	21–25		93–77	Report
20 Nov	19:30	Landstede Zwolle (Netherlands)	0–3	(Turkey) Halkbank Ankara	17–25	14–25	18–25			49–75	Report
21 Nov	18:00	Lokomotyv Kharkiv (Ukraine)	3–1	(France) AS Cannes	21–25	25–19	25–19	25–21		96–84	Report
21 Nov	19:00	Gas Pamvohaikos Vrahati (Greece)	3–0	(Cyprus) Anorthosis Famagusta	25–22	25–16	25–19			75–57	Report

=== 4th Finals ===
Team 1	Agg.	Team 2	1st leg	2nd leg
Andreoli Latina (Italy)	4–4	(Austria) Posojilnica Aich/Dob	3–1	1–3
Maliye Milli Piyango Ankara (Turkey)	4–4	(Belgium) Precura Schelde-Natie Antwerpen	3–1	1–3
Halkbank Ankara (Turkey)	6–1	(Russia) Iskra Odintsovo	3–1	3–0
Gas Pamvohaikos Vrahati (Greece)	1–6	(Ukraine) Lokomotyv Kharkiv	1–3	0–3

==== First leg ====
Date	Time		Score		Set 1	Set 2	Set 3	Set 4	Set 5	Total	Report
6 Dec	20:30	Andreoli Latina (Italy)	3–1	(Austria) Posojilnica Aich/Dob	25–20	25–27	25–19	25–19		100–85	Report
5 Dec	17:30	Maliye Milli Piyango Ankara (Turkey)	3–1	(Belgium) Precura Schelde-Natie Antwerpen	25–23	22–25	25–16	25–22		97–86	Report
5 Dec	20:00	Halkbank Ankara (Turkey)	3–1	(Russia) Iskra Odintsovo	26–28	25–21	25–20	25–23		101–92	Report
5 Dec	19:00	Gas Pamvohaikos Vrahati (Greece)	1–3	(Ukraine) Lokomotyv Kharkiv	23–25	27–25	17–25	23–25		90–100	Report

==== Second leg ====
Date	Time		Score		Set 1	Set 2	Set 3	Set 4	Set 5	Total	Report
12 Dec	19:00	Posojilnica Aich/Dob (Austria)	1–3	(Italy) Andreoli Latina	25–23	20–25	20–25	13–25		78–98	Report
12 Dec	20:30	Precura Schelde-Natie Antwerpen (Belgium)	3–1	(Turkey) Maliye Milli Piyango Ankara	26–24	25–20	22–25	25–17		98–86	Report
12 Dec	19:00	Iskra Odintsovo (Russia)	0–3	(Turkey) Halkbank Ankara	22–25	22–25	21–25			65–75	Report
12 Dec	18:00	Lokomotyv Kharkiv (Ukraine)	3–0	(Greece) Gas Pamvohaikos Vrahati	25–19	25–17	25–14			75–50	Report

== Challenge phase ==
Team 1	Agg.	Team 2	1st leg	2nd leg	Golden Set
Generali Unterhaching (Germany)	3–3	(Italy) Andreoli Latina	0–3	3–0	11–15
Jihostroj České Budějovice (Czech Republic)	1–6	(Turkey) Maliye Milli Piyango Ankara	1–3	0–3	
Halkbank Ankara (Turkey)	6–0	(Belgium) Knack Randstad Roeselare	3–0	3–0	
Tours VB (France)	4–3	(Ukraine) Lokomotyv Kharkiv	3–0	1–3	6–15

=== First leg ===
Date	Time		Score		Set 1	Set 2	Set 3	Set 4	Set 5	Total	Report
16 Jan	20:00	Generali Unterhaching (Germany)	0–3	(Italy) Andreoli Latina	23–25	18–25	24–26			65–76	Report
17 Jan	18:00	Jihostroj České Budějovice (Czech Republic)	1–3	(Turkey) Maliye Milli Piyango Ankara	25–20	15–25	23–25	25–27		88–97	Report
16 Jan	18:00	Halkbank Ankara (Turkey)	3–0	(Belgium) Knack Randstad Roeselare	25–20	25–21	25–18			75–59	Report
16 Jan	20:00	Tours VB (France)	3–0	(Ukraine) Lokomotyv Kharkiv	25–15	26–24	25–22			76–61	Report

=== Second leg ===
Date	Time		Score		Set 1	Set 2	Set 3	Set 4	Set 5	Total	Report
24 Jan	20:30	Andreoli Latina (Italy)	0–3	(Germany) Generali Unterhaching	24–26	24–26	21–25			69–77	Report
Golden set		Andreoli Latina (Italy)	15–11	(Germany) Generali Unterhaching							
24 Jan	18:00	Maliye Milli Piyango Ankara (Turkey)	3–0	(Czech Republic) Jihostroj České Budějovice	25–22	25–18	25–16			75–56	Report
23 Jan	20:30	Knack Randstad Roeselare (Belgium)	0–3	(Turkey) Halkbank Ankara	18–25	23–25	20–25			61–75	Report
23 Jan	18:00	Lokomotyv Kharkiv (Ukraine)	3–1	(France) Tours VB	25–18	25–16	17–25	30–28		97–87	Report
Golden set		Lokomotyv Kharkiv (Ukraine)	15–6	(France) Tours VB							

== Final phase ==
=== Semi finals ===
Team 1	Agg.	Team 2	1st leg	2nd leg	Golden Set
Maliye Milli Piyango Ankara (Turkey)	3–4	(Italy) Andreoli Latina	3–1	0–3	11–15
Halkbank Ankara (Turkey)	6–0	(Ukraine) Lokomotyv Kharkiv	3–0	3–0	

==== First leg ====
Date	Time		Score		Set 1	Set 2	Set 3	Set 4	Set 5	Total	Report
6 Feb	17:00	Maliye Milli Piyango Ankara (Turkey)	3–1	(Italy) Andreoli Latina	25–19	25–22	21–25	25–18		96–84	Report
6 Feb	19:30	Halkbank Ankara (Turkey)	3–0	(Ukraine) Lokomotyv Kharkiv	25–19	25–21	25–17			75–57	Report

==== Second leg ====
Date	Time		Score		Set 1	Set 2	Set 3	Set 4	Set 5	Total	Report
13 Feb	20:30	Andreoli Latina (Italy)	3–0	(Turkey) Maliye Milli Piyango Ankara	25–17	25–13	25–20			75–50	Report
Golden set		Andreoli Latina (Italy)	15–11	(Turkey) Maliye Milli Piyango Ankara							
13 Feb	18:00	Lokomotyv Kharkiv (Ukraine)	0–3	(Turkey) Halkbank Ankara	21–25	23–25	22–25			66–75	Report

=== Final ===
==== First leg ====
Date	Time		Score		Set 1	Set 2	Set 3	Set 4	Set 5	Total	Report
27 Feb	20:30	Andreoli Latina (Italy)	1–3	(Turkey) Halkbank Ankara	22–25	26–24	21–25	21–25		90–99	Report

==== Second leg ====
Date	Time		Score		Set 1	Set 2	Set 3	Set 4	Set 5	Total	Report
3 Mar	17:00	Halkbank Ankara (Turkey)	3–2	(Italy) Andreoli Latina	21–25	26–24	25–17	22–25	15–11	109–102	Report

== Final standing ==
Rank	Team
1st place, gold medalist(s)	(Turkey) Halkbank Ankara
2nd place, silver medalist(s)	(Italy) Andreoli Latina
Semifinalists	(Ukraine) Lokomotyv Kharkiv
Semifinalists	(Turkey) Maliye Milli Piyango Ankara

2013 CEV Cup winner
(Turkey)
Halkbank Ankara
1st title

Aslan Eksi, Sabit Karaagac, Ahmed Abdelhay, Nuri Şahin, Halil Yucel, Can Ayvazoğlu, William Priddy, Serhat Coşkun, Emre Batur, Hüseyin Koç, Luis Augusto Diaz Mayorca, Resul Tekeli
Head coach
Veselin Vuković
