= Luca Spirito =

Italian volleyball player (born 1993)

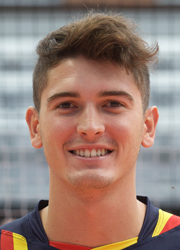

Personal information
- Nationality: Italian
- Born: 30 October 1993 (age 33); Savona, Italy
- Height: 1.99 m (6 ft 6 in)
- Weight: 87 kg (192 lb)
- Spike: 341 cm (134 in)
- Block: 310 cm (122 in)

Volleyball information
- Position: Setter
- Current club: Panathinaikos
- Number: 31

National team
Italy
Honours
Men's volleyball
Representing Italy
Mediterranean Games
Gold medal – first place	2018 Tarragona	Team

Luca Spirito (born 30 October 1993) is an Italian volleyball player for Panathinaikos and the Italian national team.

He participated at the 2017 Men's European Volleyball Championship.
