= Tokoin =

Neighborhood of Lomé, Togo

Coordinates: 6°09′N 1°13′E

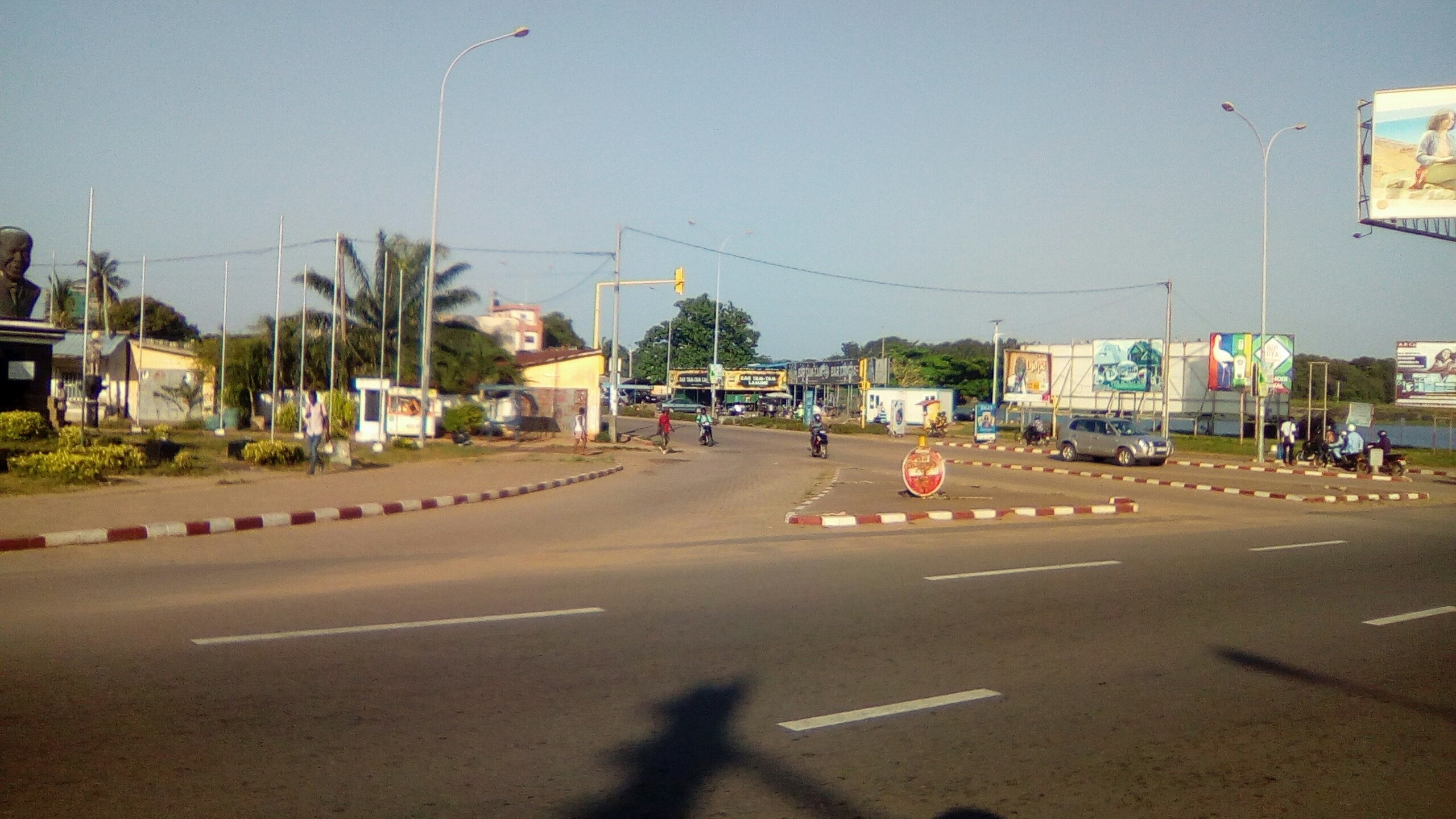
Tokoin, Lomé, Togo

Tokoin is a neighborhood of Lomé, Togo. It contains the Tokoin Teaching Hospital, and Lomé–Tokoin Airport.
