= Thomas Hoff =

American volleyball player

Tom Hoff
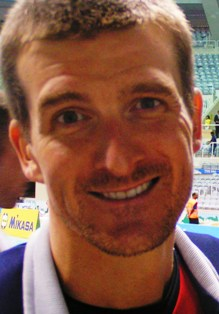

Personal information
- Full name: Thomas John Hoff
- Born: June 9, 1973 (age 53) Chicago, Illinois, U.S.
- Height: 6 ft 8 in (2.03 m)

Volleyball information
- Position: Middle blocker
- Number: 12

Career
- Years: Team
- 1992–1994 1994–1996 1999–2000 2001–2006 2006–2007 2007–2008 2008–2009: (United States) Ohio State Buckeyes (United States) Long Beach State 49ers (Japan) Toray Arrows (Greece) Iraklis Thessaloniki (Russia) Lokomotiv Belgorod (Russia) Fakel Novy Urengoy (Greece) Olympiacos

National team
- Years: Team
- 1996–2009: United States
Medal record
Men's volleyball
Representing the United States
Olympic Games
Gold medal – first place	2008 Beijing	Team competition
NORCECA Championship
Gold medal – first place	2005 Winnipeg	Team competition
Silver medal – second place	2005 Bridgetown	Team competition

Thomas John "Tom" Hoff (born June 9, 1973) is a retired American volleyball player. He was a middle blocker and has been with the U.S. national team from 1996 until 2009. He is a three-time Olympian in volleyball, having played in 2000, 2004, and 2008.

Playing with Iraklis Thessaloniki V.C., Hoff won the silver medal at the 2004–05 CEV Champions League and at the 2005–06 CEV Champions League, and in 2006 was awarded "Best Spiker".

== Personal life ==
Hoff was born in Chicago to Margaret and Richard Hoff. He has an older brother, Rich, and an older sister, Jennifer. He is married to Sandy Mora and has five daughters.

Hoff attended Maine South High School in Park Ridge, Illinois, where he graduated in 1991.

In addition to indoor volleyball, Hoff also played on the Bud Light Pro Beach Volleyball tour.

== Education ==
Hoff earned his Bachelor of Science degree in Mechanical Engineering.

=== Ohio State ===
Hoff spent his first two years at Ohio State University, where he was a two-year starter for the Buckeyes. As a sophomore in 1993, he was a First-Team All-Midwestern Intercollegiate Volleyball Association (MIVA). He guided the Buckeyes to the MIVA conference title and a 28-10 overall record. His 490 kills rank third all-time in Buckeye history. Hoff was also an AVCA Second Team All American.

=== Long Beach State ===
After transferring to Long Beach State in 1994, Hoff sat out due to transfer rules and was redshirted.

In 1995, Hoff was an AVCA First-Team All-American for the 49ers (now known as The Beach) as he notched 751 kills, 176 blocks, and a .357 hitting percentage. He set a national record for most matches with 20 or more kills (25) and 10 or more blocks (nine).

In 1996, Hoff repeated as a First-Team All-American, and helped the team finish 21-6, and 15-4 (second) in the Mountain Pacific Sports Federation, and had season totals of 479 kills, 134 blocks, and a .389 attack percentage. In the Long Beach State men's volleyball record books, Hoff ranked no. 5 in career kills (1,230), no. 2 in kills per game (6.54), no. 4 in hitting percentage (.369), and no. 2 in blocks per game (1.65).

== Clubs ==
- (Greece) Iraklis Thessaloniki V.C. (2001–2003, 2004–2006)
- (Russia) VC Lokomotiv-Belogorie (2006–2007)
- (Russia) Fakel Novy Urengoy (2007–2008)
- (Greece) Olympiacos S.C. (2008–2009)

== Awards ==
=== Individuals ===
- 2024 Long Beach State retired number 9 jersey
- 2005–06 CEV Champions League "Best Spiker"
- 2002 Greek Cup "Most Valuable Player

=== National team ===
==== Senior team ====
- 2008 Summer Olympics, Gold medal
- 2008 FIVB World League, Gold medal
- 2007 America's Cup, Gold medal
- 2005 FIVB World Grand Champions Cup, Silver medal
- 2005 America's Cup, Gold medal

=== Clubs ===
- 2009 Greek Championship - Champion, with Olympiacos S.C.
- 2009 Greek Cup - Champion, with Olympiacos S.C.
- 2004–05 CEV Champions League - Runner-up, with Iraklis Thessaloniki
- 2005–06 CEV Champions League - Runner-up, with Iraklis Thessaloniki
- 2006 Greek Cup - Champion, with Iraklis Thessaloniki
