= Clayton Stanley =

American volleyball player (born 1978)

Clay Stanley
Personal information
- Full name: Clayton Iona Stanley
- Nicknames: Clay, The Bird
- Born: January 20, 1978 (age 48) Honolulu, Hawaii, U.S.
- Education: University of Hawaii
- Height: 6 ft 9 in (2.05 m)
- Weight: 229 lb (104 kg)
- Spike: 141 in (357 cm)
- Block: 127 in (322 cm)

Volleyball information
- Position: Opposite
- Number: 13

Career
- Years: Team
- 1997–2000 2001–2002 2002–2003 2003–2004 2004–2005 2005 2005–2006 2006–2010 2010–2012 2012 2013–2016: Hawaii Rainbow Warriors; P.A.O.K. Thessaloniki; Aris Thessaloniki; Panathinaikos Athens; Iraklis Thessaloniki; Gigantes de Carolina; Iraklis Thessaloniki; Zenit Kazan; Ural Ufa; Lokomotiv Novosibirsk; Suntory Sunbirds

National team
- Years: Team
- 2000–2012: United States
Medal record
Men's volleyball
Representing United States
Olympic Games
Gold medal – first place	2008 Beijing
World Grand Champions Cup
Silver medal – second place	2005 Japan
World League
Gold medal – first place	2008 Rio de Janeiro
Silver medal – second place	2012 Sofia
Bronze medal – third place	2007 Katowice
NORCECA Championship
Gold medal – first place	2003 Mexico
Gold medal – first place	2005 Canada
Gold medal – first place	2007 United States
Silver medal – second place	2001 Barbados
Silver medal – second place	2009 Puerto Rico
Silver medal – second place	2011 Puerto Rico
America's Cup
Gold medal – first place	2007 Manau
- Updated on December 29, 2017

Clayton Iona "Clay" Stanley (born January 20, 1978) is an American former volleyball player, who was a member of United States men's national volleyball team, a participant of the Olympic Games (Athens 2004, Beijing 2008, London 2012), Olympic Champion 2008, NORCECA Champion 2005, and multimedalist of the World League.

In October 2021, he was inducted into the International Volleyball Hall of Fame, along with Logan Tom and Todd Rogers.

== Personal life ==
Stanley was born in Honolulu, Hawaii, to Jon Stanley and Sandra Haine. He has three brothers (Reese Haine, Wil Stanley and Jon Stanley), and two sisters (Taeya Stanley and Natasha Haine). His parents and grandfather Tom Haine were volleyball players. His mother and grandfather represented Canada, father Jon represented United States. Stanley's father played on 1968 Olympic Games and is a member of the Volleyball Hall of Fame. Stanley's step-grandfather, Tom Haine, was also on the 1968 men's Olympic volleyball team. His mother, Sandra Haine, played professionally for the Denver Comets as well as for Canada's national team. With Stanley's first Olympic appearance in Athens, Greece, he and his father became the first father-son Olympians in U.S. volleyball history.

In July 2013, he married Kristin (née Jackson). In March 2014, they announced that they were expecting their first child.

== College ==
Stanley is a graduate of Kaiser High School in Honolulu and did not play volleyball in high school, as the school did not have a boys' team at the time.

Stanley attended the University of Hawaiʻi, where he majored in Spanish. Stanley was a freshman in 1997, but redshirted his sophomore year. He decided to forgo his 2000 senior redshirt year to play professionally.

In 1999, Stanley broke Hawaiʻi's single-match kill record with 50 kills against UCLA. In 2000, he was Third-Team All-Mountain Pacific Sports Federation and ranked in the Top 15 of the nation with a 5.53 kill average. He led the MPSF in aces and tied team record with 54. He finished his career 10th on all-time kill list at Hawaii.

In 2008, Stanley was inducted into the University of Hawaii Sports Circle of Honor.

== International ==
Playing at the 2004 Summer Olympics, Stanley led the team and finished fifth overall in scoring with 110 points on 83 kills, 17 aces and 10 blocks. His 17 aces ranked second among all players in the tournament. At the 2008 Summer Olympics in Beijing, China, Stanley helped Team USA to its first gold medal in 20 years. For his performances during the tournament, he was selected as the MVP, Best Scorer, and Best Server of the Olympics.

With the professional club Iraklis Thessaloniki, he won the silver medal at the 2004–05 CEV Champions League and was awarded "Best Scorer" and "Best Server". The next season he also won the silver medal and was awarded "Best Scorer".

Playing with Dynamo-Tattransgaz he won the 2007–08 Indesit Champions League and also was individually awarded "Most Valuable Player".

Stanley was one of the older members of the 2012 Olympic team that lost in the quarterfinals. Stanley picked up a knee injury in London and never again played in a major tournament for the U.S. In August 2016 he retired from professional career.

== Awards ==
=== Individuals ===
- 2012 FIVB Volleyball World League "Best Server"
- 2010 FIVB World Championship "Best Server"
- 2009-10 CEV Champions League League Round "Best Server"
- 2008 Summer Olympics "Most Valuable Player"
- 2008 Summer Olympics "Best Scorer"
- 2008 Summer Olympics "Best Server"
- 2007 NORCECA Volleyball Championship "Best Server"
- 2007–08 CEV Champions League Final Four "Most Valuable Player"
- 2005 Liga de Voleibol Superior "Dream Team"
- 2005–06 CEV Champions League "Best Scorer"
- 2004–05 CEV Champions League "Best Scorer"
- 2004–05 CEV Champions League "Best Server"
- 2003 NORCECA Volleyball Championship "Most Valuable Player"

=== National team ===
==== Senior team ====
- 2009 FIVB World Grand Champions Cup, Bronze medal
- 2008 Summer Olympics, Gold medal
- 2008 FIVB World League, Gold medal
- 2007 NORCECA Championship, Gold medal
- 2007 America's Cup, Gold medal
- 2007 FIVB World League, Bronze medal
- 2005 NORCECA Championship, Gold medal
- 2005 FIVB World Grand Champions Cup, Silver medal

=== Clubs ===
- 2007–08 CEV Indesit Champions League - Champion, Dynamo-Tattransgaz
- 2005–06 CEV Champions League - Runner-up, with Iraklis Thessaloniki
- 2004–05 CEV Champions League - Runner-up, with Iraklis Thessaloniki
