= Ryan Millar =

American volleyball player

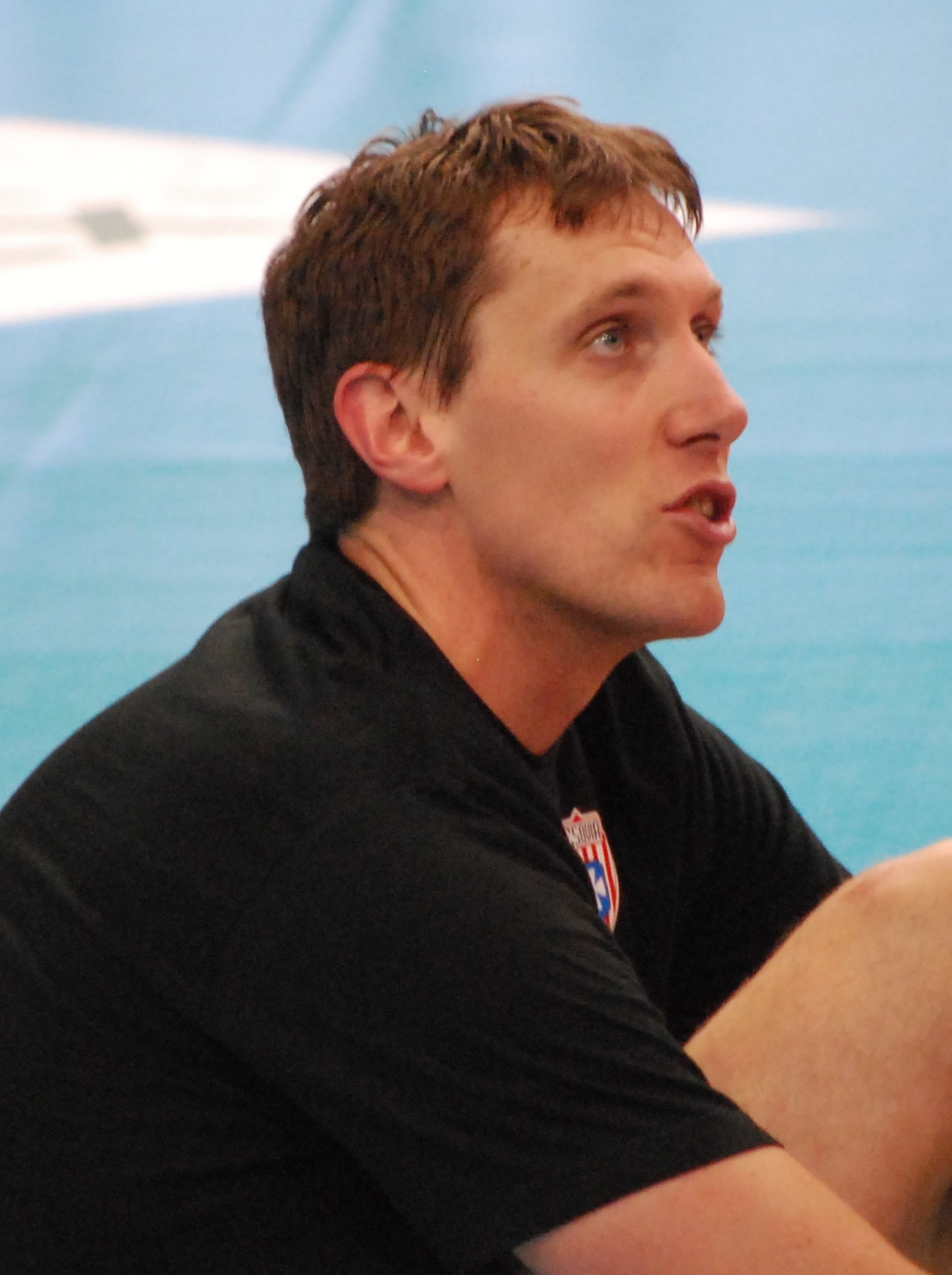

Personal information
- Full name: Ryan Madsen Millar
- Born: January 22, 1978 (age 48); San Dimas, California, U.S.
- Height: 6 ft 8 in (2.04 m)
- Weight: 216 lb (98 kg)
- Spike: 139 in (354 cm)
- Block: 128 in (326 cm)
- Education: Brigham Young University

Volleyball information
- Position: Middle blocker
- Number: 9

Career
Years	Teams
2000–2001; 2001–2005; 2005–2006; 2007–2008; 2008–2010; 2010–2011; 2011–2012	Volley Forlì; Gabeca Montichiari; Itas Diatec Trentino; Sparkling Milano; İstanbul Büyükşehir Belediyesi; Asseco Resovia Rzeszów; Lokomotiv Novosibirsk

National team
1998–2008	United States
Medal record
Men's volleyball
Representing United States
Olympic Games
Gold medal – first place	2008 Beijing	Team
World League
Gold medal – first place	2008 Rio
Bronze medal – third place	2007 Katowice
NORCECA Championship
Gold medal – first place	2003 Culiacan
Gold medal – first place	2005 Winnipeg
Gold medal – first place	2007 Anaheim
America's Cup
Gold medal – first place	2007 Manaus
Silver medal – second place	1999 Tampa
Bronze medal – third place	2000 São Bernardo
Pan American Cup
Gold medal – first place	2006 Mexico
- Last updated: February 21, 2017

Ryan Madsen Millar (born 22 January 1978) is an American former volleyball player. He was a member of United States national volleyball team from 1998 to 2008, and is a three-time Olympian (2000, 2004, 2008). He won a gold medal in the 2008 Olympics in Beijing, and is a three-time NORCECA Champion.

== Personal life ==
Millar was born in San Dimas, California. He graduated from Brigham Young University in 2001.

== Career ==
Millar played volleyball at Brigham Young University in Provo, Utah, from 1996-1999.

In 1996, he was named the Volleyball Magazine National Freshman of the Year and was a Third-Team All-Mountain Pacific Sports Federation (MPSF). In 1999, he was named the MPSF Player of the Year and was a First Team American Volleyball Coaches Association (AVCA) All-American. In 1998, he finished second in the nation in blocks per game (2.02) en route to repeating as a First Team All-American. In 1999, he capped off his successful career by leading BYU to the program's first ever NCAA Men's Volleyball Championship and was once again a First Team All-American as he ranked first in the country in hitting percentage (.498) and blocks per game (2.14)

In July 2006, Millar was named as an assistant coach for the BYU men's volleyball team under Head Coach Tom Peterson. In August 2006, Millar was named co-interim head coach of the BYU men's volleyball team after Peterson's sudden resignation.

He has played at the 2000 Olympics, 2004 Olympics and the 2008 Olympics. In 2000, the U.S. men had a disappointing Olympic tournament, failing to win a single match. At Athens, Millar helped the U.S. men finished fourth overall. During the Olympics, he ranked fourth on the team in scoring with 70 points on 53 kills, and 16 blocks. In 2008, Millar helped Team USA to the gold medal.

In 2024, Millar was hired as the head volleyball coach at Eastern Illinois University in Charleston, Illinois.

== Achievements ==
=== Clubs ===
==== National championships ====
- 2010/2011 Polish Championship, with Asseco Resovia Rzeszów
- 2011/2012 Russian Cup, with Lokomotiv Novosibirsk
- 2011/2012 Russian Championship, with Lokomotiv Novosibirsk

=== Individual ===
- 2005 NORCECA Championship - Best Blocker
- 2005 FIVB World Grand Champions Cup - Best Blocker
- 2007 USA Volleyball - Indoor Player of the Year
