= Lloy Ball =

American volleyball player

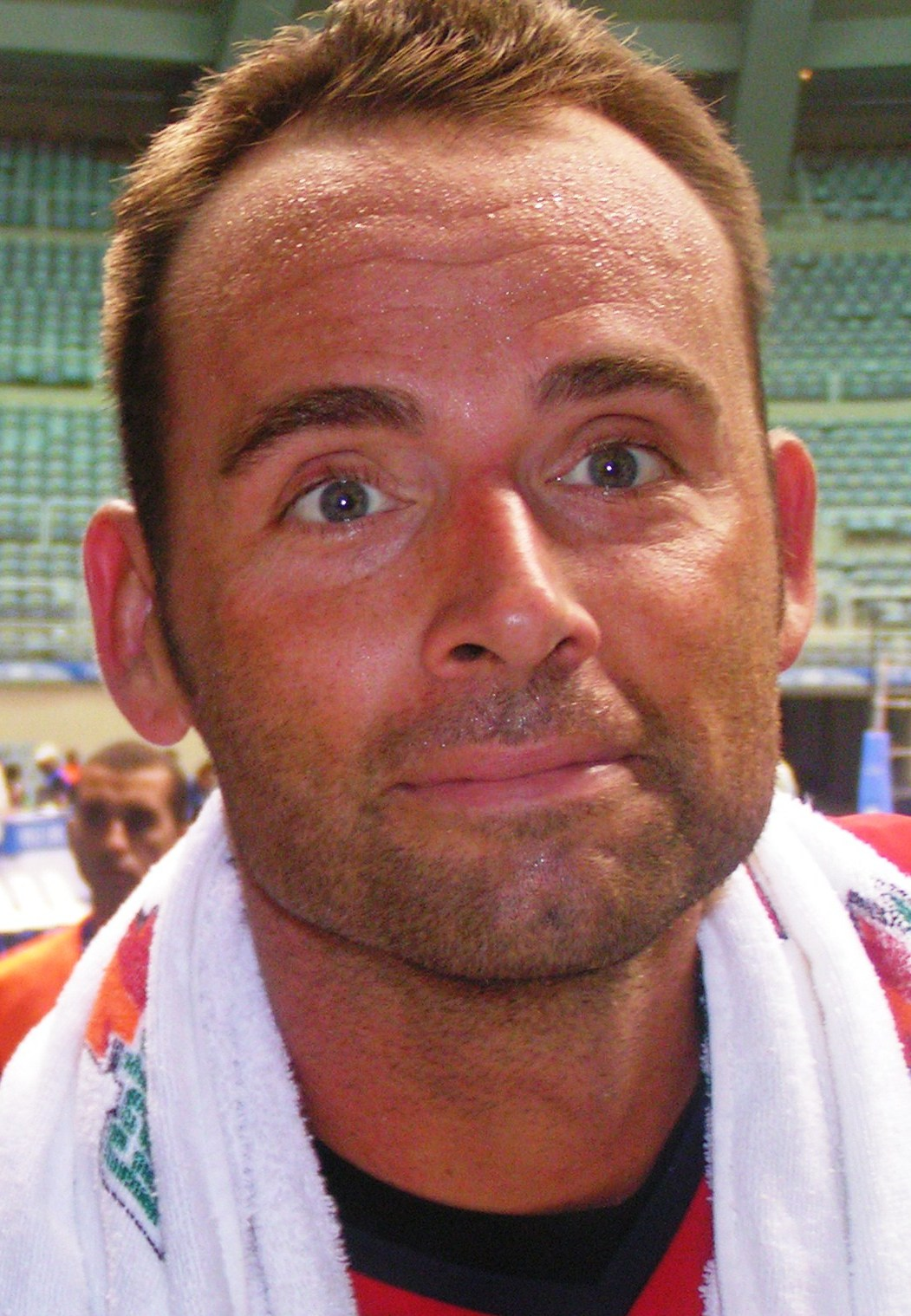
- Ball in 2008

Personal information
- Full name: Lloy James Ball
- Born: February 17, 1972 (age 54); Fort Wayne, Indiana, U.S.
- Hometown: Woodburn, Indiana, U.S.
- Height: 2.03 m (6 ft 8 in)
- Weight: 95 kg (209 lb)
- Education: IPFW

Volleyball information
- Position: Setter
- Number: 1

Career
Years	Teams
1991–1995; 1996–1999; 2000–2004; 2004–2006; 2006–2011; 2011–2012	(United States) Purdue Fort Wayne (Japan) Toray Arrows (Italy) Casa Modena (Greece) Iraklis Thessaloniki (Russia) Zenit Kazan (Russia) Ural Ufa

National team
1993–2008	United States (398)
Medal record
Men's volleyball
Representing United States
Olympic Games
Gold medal – first place	2008 Beijing	Team
World Championship
Bronze medal – third place	1994 Greece	Team
NORCECA Championship
Gold medal – first place	2007 Anaheim
World League
Gold medal – first place	2008 Rio de Janeiro
Pan American Games
Silver medal – second place	1995 Mar del Plata	Team

Lloy James Ball (born February 17, 1972) is an American former volleyball player, who was a member of American national team from 1993 to 2008. Ball is a four-time Olympian, and a gold medalist of Beijing 2008. He is also a gold medalist of the 2007 NORCECA Championship and 2008 World League, silver medalist of the 1995 Pan American Games, bronze medalist of the 1994 FIVB World Championship, and 2015 inductee to the International Volleyball Hall of Fame.

== High school ==
Ball grew up in Woodburn, Indiana, where he attended Woodlan High School. Because Ball grew up in a state that did not sanction varsity competition in boys' volleyball, he only played competitively during the summer. He made his first breakthrough at age 15 by being selected for the 1987 Olympic Festival.

Ball also played basketball. As a junior, Ball's team lost in the sectional finals to a stellar Bishop Dwenger Saint's Basketball team. It was a crushing loss for Ball and was a huge factor in driving him towards his future success. This Dwenger team consisted of stars like TJ Steele, David Lion, John Sullivan, Tim Burns and Brian Finley. Ball was recruited by Bobby Knight to play the game at Indiana University.

== College ==
Ball attended Indiana University – Purdue University Fort Wayne (IPFW) (Note: In 2018, the Indiana University and Purdue University systems dissolved IPFW. Each system established a new Fort Wayne campus at that time. The IPFW athletic program was transferred to the new Purdue University Fort Wayne, and now competes as the Purdue Fort Wayne Mastodons.) from 1991 to 1995, and played volleyball there for his father, Arnie Ball. In his freshman season, he was named Volleyball Magazine National Freshman of the Year as he recorded 1,421 assists to go along with 171 digs, 113 blocks, and 164 kills on the year. In his sophomore season, he was an American Volleyball Coaches Association (AVCA) second-team All-American, and also broke the school record for single season assists (2,047).

In his junior year, he was selected as a second-team All-American and was the Midwestern Intercollegiate Volleyball Association (MIVA) Player of the Year and recorded a career high 106 assists vs. Ball State. He ranked among the top 20 in the nation in hitting percentage and aces per game. In 1994, he was a first-team All-American and repeated as the MIVA Player of the Year. He led IPFW to the NCAA Men's Volleyball Championship semifinals, before suffering a broken hand prior to the match.

In 2007, Ball was inducted into the IPFW Athletics Hall of Fame alongside his father as part of the inaugural class. Following the 2018 dissolution of IPFW and the transfer of its athletic program to the newly created Purdue University Fort Wayne, the institution is now known as the Purdue Fort Wayne Athletics Hall of Fame.

== National team ==
=== International ===
Ball competed at the 1991 (silver) and 1993 World University Games. He was also on the national team that won the silver medal at the 1995 Pan American Games. Ball was selected for the USA national team in May 1994 after concluding a stellar collegiate career at IPFW.

Ball represented the U.S. men's volleyball team at the 2007 FIVB Men's World Cup, helping the team to finish fourth. At the 2008 FIVB World League, Ball led the U.S. men to its first ever World League title, by defeating Serbia in the final. Ball was named the "Best Setter" and Most Valuable Player of the tournament.

=== Olympics ===
Ball made his Olympic debut at the 1996 Atlanta Olympics, where Team USA finished in ninth place tie with South Korea, after having claimed the bronze medal two years earlier at the World Championships. At the 2000 Sydney Olympics, Ball started but the USA had a disappointing tournament, not winning a match and finishing with an 11th place tie with Egypt.

At the 2004 Athens Olympics, Ball led Team USA to the semifinals, where they lost to eventual gold medalist Brazil. They earned their way to the bronze medal match, but were swept by Russia to come down to a fourth-place finish. Despite not getting a medal, it was the best Olympic finish for the men since they won the bronze medal in 1992.

With his selection to the 2008 Olympic squad, Ball became the first male volleyball player from the United States to compete in four Olympics. After leading Team USA past Russia in five sets at the 2008 Beijing Olympics semifinals, Ball led Team USA to the gold medal by defeating the top-ranked Brazilians in four sets. During the tournament, the U.S. never lost a match, going undefeated at 8–0.

=== Snow volleyball ===
In 2018, he was part of the United States men's national snow volleyball team.

== Professional ==
With the professional club Iraklis Thessaloniki, he won two silver medals at the 2004–05 and 2005–06 CEV Champions League. In 2004–05 he was also awarded "Best Setter".

With the professional club VC Zenit Kazan he won a gold medal at the 2007–08 CEV Champions League and a third silver medal at the 2010–11 CEV Champions League, along with a second "Best Setter" award.

In 2019, Ball was one of the founding members of a grass-roots professional level league in the United States called the Volleyball League of America (VLA).

== Personal life ==
When not on the court actively playing the game, Ball operates Team Pineapple, a volleyball clinic that also features his father, Arnie Ball.

Ball currently resides in Angola, Indiana, with his wife, son, and daughter. In March 2023, Ball was arrested and subsequently sentenced to serve roughly six months in home detention for his third conviction on a misdemeanor count of operating while intoxicated.

== Awards ==
=== Individual ===
- 2015 International Volleyball Hall of Fame
- 2010–11 CEV Champions League "Best Setter"
- 2008 FIVB World League "Best Setter"'
- 2008 FIVB World League "Most Valuable Player"'
- 2007 NORCECA Championship "Best Setter"
- 2007 NORCECA Championship "Most Valuable Player"
- Inducted into IPFW Athletics Hall of Fame (2007, the inaugural class)
- 2004–05 CEV Champions League "Best Setter"
- 2003 NORCECA Championship "Best Setter"
- 1999 FIVB World Cup "Best Setter"
