= Vladimir Nikolov (volleyball) =

Bulgarian volleyball player (born 1977)

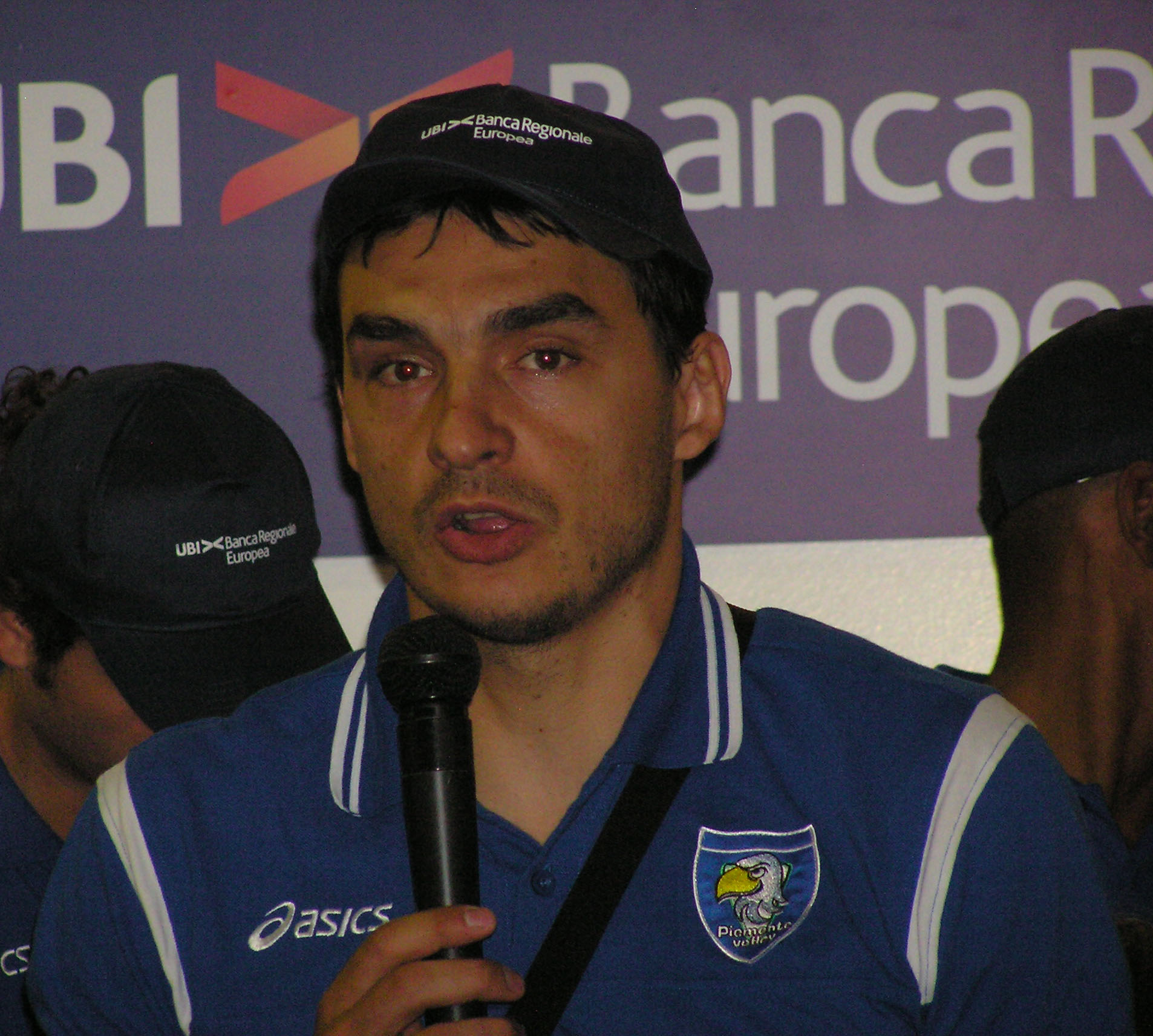

Personal information
- Full name: Vladimir Milchev Nikolov
- Born: 3 October 1977 (age 49) Sofia, Bulgaria
- Height: 2.00 m (6 ft 7 in)
- Weight: 95 kg (209 lb)
- Spike: 345 cm (136 in)
- Block: 325 cm (128 in)

Volleyball information
- Position: Opposite spiker

National team
- Years: Team
- 1997–2016: Bulgaria
Honours
Men's volleyball
Representing Bulgaria
World Championship
Bronze medal – third place	2006 Japan	Team
FIVB World Cup
Bronze medal – third place	2007 Japan	Team competition
European Championships
Bronze medal – third place	2009 Turkey	Team

Vladimir Milchev Nikolov (Bulgarian: Владимир Милчев Николов; born 3 October 1977) is a retired Bulgarian volleyball player, a former member and captain of his country's national team. In 2026, he is elected as a member of parliament in the 52nd National Assembly from the Progressive Bulgaria party.

Vladimir Nikolov played as a wing-spiker and has been part of the Bulgarian national team in all recent championships. At a club level, he has played for Levski Siconco (five Bulgarian titles), Erdemirspor Kdz.Ereğli-Zonguldak (Turkey), Tours VB (CEV Champions League 2005–06, one championship and two Cup titles of France), Toray Arrows, Japan and Trentino Volley (One Italian championship title). With Bre Banca Lannutti Cuneo he won the bronze medal at the 2008–09 CEV Cup and also was individually awarded "Best Blocker".

With the professional club Tours Volley-Ball, he won the 2004–05 CEV Champions League and was awarded "Most Valuable Player".

In 2020, Nikolov was found guilty of an anti-doping rule violation after a reanalysis of his London 2012 Olympic sample detected the banned steroid methyltestosterone, though the case became public only in 2023. He was ordered to return his Olympic diploma and pin, with no changes to his team's results.

== Clubs ==
- (Bulgaria) Levski Volley (1995–2002)
- (Turkey) Erdemirspor (2002–2003)
- (France) Tours Volley-Ball (2003–2006)
- (Japan) Toray Arrows (2006–2007)
- (Italy) Trentino Volley (2007–2008)
- (Italy) Piemonte Volley (2008–2011)
- (Italy) Copra Volley (2011–2012)
- (Turkey) Galatasaray (2012–2013)
- (France) ASUL Lyon (2013–2016)
- (Bulgaria) Levski Volley (2018–2019)

== Awards ==
=== Individual ===
- 2004–05 CEV Champions League "Most Valuable Player"
- 2008-09 CEV Cup "Best Blocker"

=== Clubs ===
- 2004–05 CEV Indesit Champions League - Champion, with Tours VB
