= Luis Sosa (volleyball) =

Cuban volleyball player (born 1995)

Luis Tomas Sosa Sierra

Personal information
- Full name: Luis Tomas Sosa Sierra
- Born: 18 May 1995 (age 31); Havana, Cuba
- Height: 1.96 m (6 ft 5 in)
- Weight: 76 kg (168 lb)
- Spike: 345 cm (136 in)
- Block: 320 cm (126 in)

Volleyball information
- Position: Outside hitter
- Number: 16 (national team)

Career
Years	Teams
2015	La Habana

National team
2015–2016	Cuba

Luis Tomas Sosa Sierra (born 18 May 1995), also known as Luis Sosa, is a Cuban volleyball player. He played for the Cuban men's national volleyball team. On club level he played for La Habana.

== Acquittal by Finnish government ==
Sosa did not play in the Rio Olympics in 2016 for being one of the six players of the Cuban national volleyball team that were remanded into custody suspected of committing aggravated rape in July 2016 in Tampere, Finland. In September 2016, he was sentenced to three years and six months in prison. The Turku Court of Appeal overturned the decision in June 2017 due to lack of compelling evidence in his case, leading to Sosa's release. He was compensated 200,000 euros by the Finnish government for his time spent in prison.
