= Valerio Vermiglio =

Italian volleyball player

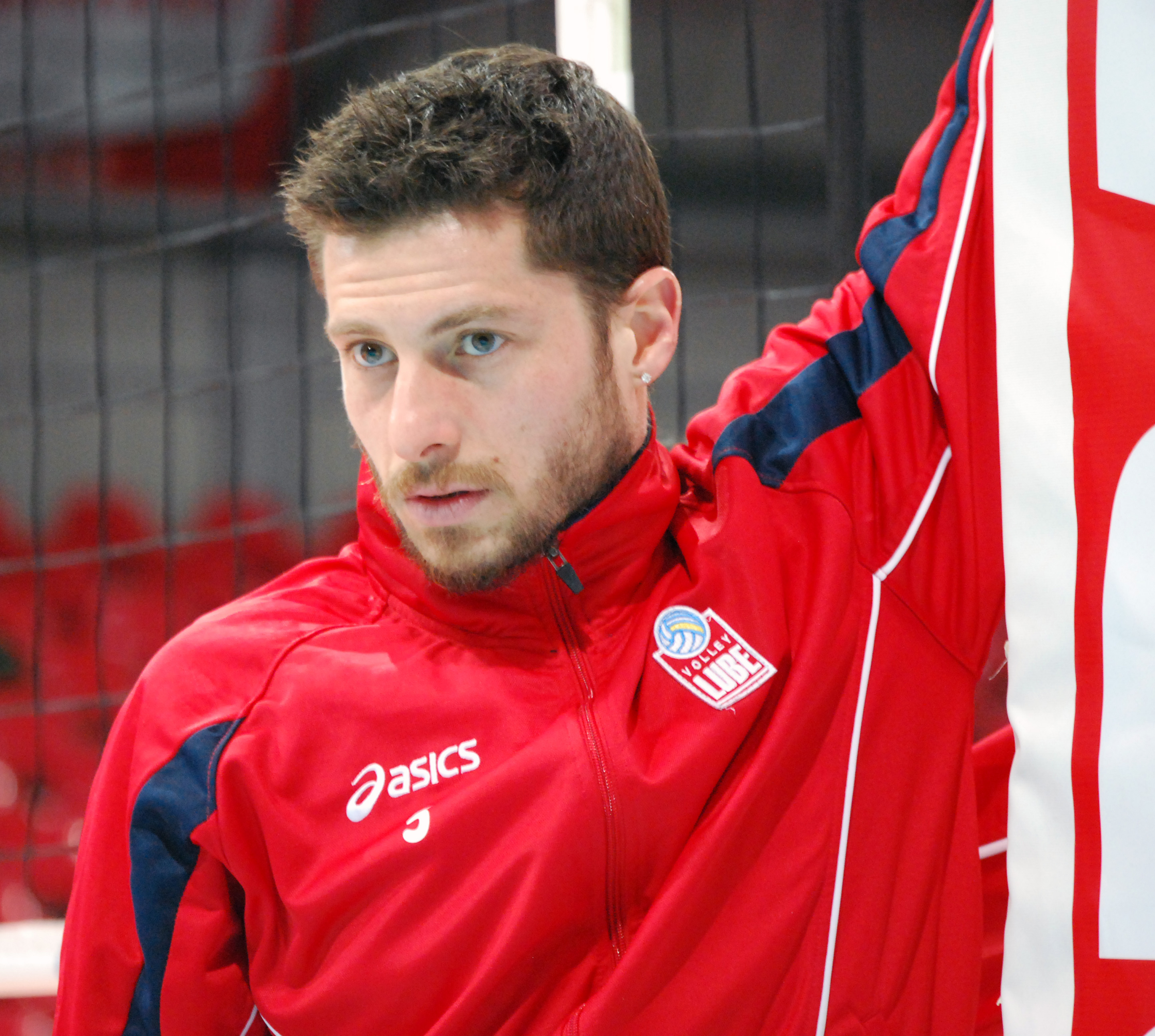

Personal information
- Nationality: Italian
- Born: March 1, 1976 (age 50); Messina, Italy
- Height: 197 cm (6 ft 6 in)

Volleyball information
- Position: Setter
- Number: 5

National team
Italy
Honours
Men's volleyball
Representing Italy
Olympic Games
Silver medal – second place	2004 Athens	Team
World Cup
Silver medal – second place	2003 Japan	Team
European Championship
Gold medal – first place	2003 Berlin	Team
Gold medal – first place	2005 Belgrade & Rome	Team
Silver medal – second place	2001 Ostrava	Team
Summer Universiade
Silver medal – second place	1997 Catania	Team
Bronze medal – third place	1995 Fukuoka	Team

Valerio Vermiglio (born 1 March 1976) is an Italian volleyball player who was a member of the Italian men's national team that won the silver medal at the 2004 Summer Olympics in Athens, Greece.

== Career ==
Vermiglio played with Sisley Treviso and won the 2005–06 CEV Champions League, and he also was awarded "Best Setter".

Vermiglio won the 2011–12 CEV Champions League playing with Zenit Kazan, also winning the "Best Setter" award.

== Clubs ==
- (Italy) Sisley Treviso (2002-2007)
- (Italy) Lube Banca Marche Macerata (2007-2011)
- (Russia) Zenit Kazan (2011-2013)
- (Russia) Fakel Novy Urengoy (2013-2014)
- (Italy) Copra Elior Piacenza (2014-2015)
- (Iran) Shahrdari Urmia (2015)
- (Iran) Paykan Tehran (2015-2016)
- (Argentina) UPCN San Juan (2016-)

== Sporting achievements ==
=== Individuals ===
- 2005–06 CEV Champions League "Best Setter"
- 2011–12 CEV Champions League "Best Setter"

=== Clubs ===
- 2005–06 CEV Champions League - Champion, with Sisley Treviso
- 2011–12 CEV Champions League - Champion, with Zenit Kazan

=== State awards ===
- 2000 Knight's Order of Merit of the Italian Republic
- 2004 Officer's Order of Merit of the Italian Republic
