= Murray Grapentine =

Canadian volleyball player (born 1977)

Personal information
- Born: August 24, 1977 (age 49); Wetaskiwin, Alberta, Canada
- Height: 2.02 m (6 ft 8 in)
- Weight: 92 kg (203 lb)
- Spike: 359 cm (141 in)
- Block: 334 cm (131 in)
- Education: Red Deer College; University of Alberta

Volleyball information
- Position: Middle Blocker

Career
Years	Teams
1995–1996; 1996–1999; 1999–2000; 2000–2002; 2002–2005; 2005–2006; 2006–2007; 2007–2008	Red Deer Kings; Alberta Golden Bears; Rio Duero Soria; Tours VB; Paris Volley; Narbonne Volley; AS Cannes; Volley Lube

National team
1997–2008	Canada
Honours
Men's volleyball
Representing Canada
Pan American Games
Bronze medal – third place	1999 Winnipeg	Team
NORCECA Championship
Silver medal – second place	2003 Culiacan	Team
Bronze medal – third place	2001 Bridgetown	Team
- Last updated: 2024-08-11

Murray Grapentine (born August 24, 1977 in Wetaskiwin, Alberta) is a volleyball player from Canada, who competes for the Men's National Team. Playing as a middle-blocker he was named Best Blocker at the 2003 and the 2007 NORCECA Championship. He played CIAU volleyball for the Alberta Golden Bears where he won a CIAU National Championship team in 1997 and was named the CIAU Men's Volleyball Player of the Year in 1999.

== Individual awards ==
- 2003 NORCECA Championship "Best Blocker"
- 2006 Pan-American Cup "Best Blocker"
- 2007 NORCECA Championship "Best Blocker"
