= Scott Koskie =

Canadian volleyball player (born 1971)

Personal information
- Nationality: Canadian
- Born: December 14, 1971 (age 54); Winnipeg, Manitoba
- Height: 1.90 m (6 ft 3 in)
- Weight: 85 kg (187 lb)
- Education: University of Manitoba

Volleyball information
- Position: Setter
Honours
Men's volleyball
Representing Canada
NORCECA Championship
Bronze medal – third place	2005 Winnipeg	Team
Bronze medal – third place	2001 Bridgetown	Team

Scott Koskie (born December 14, 1971) is a former volleyball player, who played as a setter for the Canada men's national volleyball team. He was an assistant coach for the Canadian Women's national team in Winnipeg, Manitoba. He was named Best Setter at the 2005 NORCECA Championship in Winnipeg, where Team Canada finished in third place.

== Individual awards ==
- 2005 NORCECA Championship "Best Setter"
