= Arnie Ball =

American volleyball coach

Personal information
- Born: November 12, 1944 (age 81); United States
- Hometown: , United States
- Education: Ball State University, 1967–1971

Coaching information
Previous teams coached
Years	Teams
1978–2015; 1978–1988; 1983; 1985; 1987; 1988; 1993; 1993; 1994; 2000	IPFW Mastodons (men); IPFW Mastodons (women); HC, North squad, National Sports Festival; AC, World University Games; HC, Olympic Festival; Director, USVBA Junior Elite Camp; HC, Olympic Festival; HC, World University Games (bronze); HC, Olympic Festival (gold); Scout, U.S. Men's National Team

Best results
Years	Location	Result
1984; 1986; 1987; 1988; 1990; 1991; 1991; 1992; 1992; 1993; 1994; 1994; 1996; 1999; 2006; 2007	GLVA Conference Championship; GLVA Conference Championship; GLVA Conference Championship; GLVA Conference Championship; MIVA Conference Championship; MIVA Conference Championship; NCAA Final Four; MIVA Conference Championship; NCAA Final Four; MIVA Conference Championship; MIVA Conference Championship; NCAA Final Four; NCAA Final Four; MIVA Conference Championship; NCAA Final Four; NCAA Final Four	1st 1st 1st 1st 1st 1st 3rd 1st 4th 1st 1st 4th 3rd 1st 3rd 2nd
- Last updated: December 26, 2016

Armond J. "Arnie" Ball (born November 12, 1944) is an American retired volleyball coach best known for his 35 seasons as head coach of the men's volleyball team at Indiana University – Purdue University Fort Wayne (IPFW), now known as the Purdue Fort Wayne Mastodons. He ended his career in 2015 with a total of 570 wins as coach of the IPFW men, and also won 230 games as head coach of the IPFW women's team in the 1980s.

Ball also runs Team Pineapple, a volleyball clinic that also features his son, Olympic gold medalist Lloy Ball.

== High school coaching career ==
Following a successful player career at Ball State, Coach Ball became a high school gym teacher. One of his first positions was at New Haven High School, a part of the East Allen County Schools system. In 1973, Ball moved to Paul Harding High School when EACS opened this new high school. He began his coaching career as Harding's first head baseball coach, and he also founded the school's volleyball program as a non-sanctioned club sport. He led the Hawks to three Indiana Volleyball Coaches Association Championships. In 1978, Ball began coaching at the collegiate level when he introduced volleyball to IPFW. In 1981, Ball made the full-time move to IPFW, taking the helm of both the men's and women's volleyball programs.

== IPFW ==
During Ball's tenure at IPFW, the Mastodons men's team made a significant impact on a sport traditionally dominated by West Coast schools. His resume includes six trips to the NCAA Final Four, seven MIVA Championships and rosters dotted with All-Conference, All-American and U.S. Olympic team selections.

IPFW's best national finish under Ball came in 2007, as the 'Dons took home a National Runner-Up trophy, falling 3–1 to UC-Irvine in Columbus, Ohio. For the storied season, Ball was named both the AVCA Division I-II National Coach of the Year and Asics/Volleyball Magazine Coach of the Year.

In addition to the Runner-Up season, Ball has led teams to fourth-place finishes in 1992 and 1994 and third-place finishes in 1991, 1996 and 2006. Fifteen players have been named AVCA All-American, six have been honored as the MIVA Player of the Year and two have gone on to play in the Olympics.

At the helm of the women's team, IPFW captured four Great Lakes Valley Conference (GLVC) championships and earned bids in the NCAA Division II Tournament in 1987 and 1988. He wrapped his eight-year women's team tenure with an overall record of 231–102 (.693).

Despite the national and international travels that Ball has enjoyed in the sport, his local focus has always remained a stronghold in the Fort Wayne community. In 2005, Ball was presented with the prestigious Hilliard Gates Achievement Award for his lifetime accomplishments and contributions to the sporting community of Fort Wayne.

Ball's service to IPFW extends beyond the volleyball court sidelines. Ball served as the school's Athletic Director from 1988 to 1995.

== National and international activities ==
During his coaching career, Ball has enjoyed several appointments to US Volleyball coaching staffs:

- In 1983, Ball served as head coach of the North squad at the National Sports Festival in Colorado Springs, Colo.
- In 1985, Ball served as an assistant coach for the World University Games US men's team in Kobe, Japan
- In 1987, 1993 and 1994, Ball took the helm of squads in the Olympic Festival. His 1994 team captured a gold in St. Louis.
- In 1988, Ball was the director of the USVBA Junior Elite Camp in Boulder, Colo.
- In 1993, USA Volleyball appointed Ball as the head coach of the U.S. Team in the World University games. Ball rallied the young team to a 3rd place (bronze) finish after a number of impressive wins, including a five-set victory over France.
- In 2000, Ball had the prestigious honor of serving as a scout for the U.S. National Team, selecting the team for the Olympic Games held in Sydney, Australia.

== Notable achievements ==
- NCAA National Championship Match (2007)
- NCAA Final Four – 3rd place (2006, 1996, 1991)
- NCAA Final Four – 4th place (1994, 1992)

== Awards and honors ==
- Inducted into AVCA Hall of Fame (2012)
- Dick Lugar Health and Fitness Award (2008)
- AVCA Division I-II National Coach of the Year (2007)
- Asics/Volleyball Magazine Coach of the Year (2007)
- Red coat recipient, Mad Anthonys (2007)
- Inducted into Purdue Fort Wayne Athletics Hall of Fame (2006, the inaugural class of the institution then known as the IPFW Athletics Hall of Fame)
- Hillard Gates Achievement Award (2005)

== Coaching record ==
Year	Team	Overall	Conference	Standing	
IPFW Mastodons (men) (MIVA) (1981–2015)
1981	IPFW	14–20			
1982	IPFW	13–12			
1983	IPFW	9–14	1–7	T-4th	
1984	IPFW	21–13	1–5	T-3rd	
1985	IPFW	22–12	2–4	3rd	
1986	IPFW	15–12			
1987	IPFW	15–14			
1988	IPFW	16–16	3–3	3rd	
1989	IPFW	21–9	4–2	2nd	
1990	IPFW	16–15	5–1	1st	
1991	IPFW	19–9	6–0	1st	L NCAA National Semi-Finals Match
1992	IPFW	27–9	6–0	1st	L NCAA National Semi-Finals Match
1993	IPFW	23–7	5–1	T-2nd	
1994	IPFW	20–8	9–1	1st	L NCAA National Semi-Finals Match
1995	IPFW	13–19	8–4	T-3rd	
1996	IPFW	10–15	6–8	T-4th	L NCAA National Semi-Finals Match
1997	IPFW	17–9	13–3	3rd	
1998	IPFW	17–5	7–3	2nd	
1999	IPFW	23–4	12–2	T-1st	
2000	IPFW	21–8	12–2	2nd	
*2001	IPFW	9–15	8–8	6th	
*2002	IPFW	8–16	6–10	T-6th	
*2003	IPFW	15–10	10–6	5th	
2004	IPFW	14–11	12–4	T-2nd	
2005	IPFW	13–17	8–8	5th	
2006	IPFW	23–7	9–3	2nd	L NCAA National Semi-Finals Match
2007	IPFW	23–8	9–3	2nd	L NCAA National Championship Match
2008	IPFW	12–15	5–7	5th	
2009	IPFW	12–15	3–7	5th	
2010	IPFW	12–17	4–8	5th	
2011	IPFW	16–12	5–7	5th	
2012	IPFW	13–15	5–7	T-4th	
2013	IPFW	13–13	5–9	T-6th	
2014	IPFW	21–7	9–5	4th	
2015	IPFW	18–12	8–8	4th	
IPFW men:		570–421	206–146		
IPFW Mastodons (women) (GLVC) (1981–1988)
1981	IPFW	25–19			
1982	IPFW	28–17			
1983	IPFW	33–16			
1984	IPFW	34–14			
1985	IPFW	24–13			
1986	IPFW	30–4			
1987	IPFW	29–7			L NCAA Regional Championship Match
1988	IPFW	27–12			L NCAA Regional Semi-Finals Match
IPFW women:		230–102			
Total:		800–523			
National championship Conference title Conference division title or championship game berth
^{†}Indicates Bowl Coalition, Bowl Alliance, BCS, or CFP / New Years' Six bowl.; ^{#}Rankings from final Coaches Poll.

- – Conference member Lewis had all wins vacated for seasons 2001, 2002, and 2003. The records included above reflect the actual outcome of matches with Lewis for those years. If the vacated matches were reflected as IPFW wins, then the IPFW conference record for those years would be 10–6, 7–9, and 12–4, respectively.
