= Dennis Del Valle =

Puerto Rican male volleyball player (born 1989)

Personal information
- Full name: Dennis Jose Del Valle Villalobos
- Nationality: Puerto Rico
- Born: 27 January 1989 (age 37)
- Height: 1.75 m (5 ft 9 in)
- Weight: 58 kg (128 lb)
- Spike: 300 cm (118 in)
- Block: 290 cm (114 in)

Volleyball information
- Number: 4

Career
Years	Teams
2014	(Puerto Rico) Mets de Guaynabo

National team
2014	Puerto Rico

Dennis Jose Del Valle Villalobos (born 27 January 1989) is a Puerto Rican male volleyball player. He was part of the Puerto Rico men's national volleyball team at the 2014 FIVB Volleyball Men's World Championship in Poland. He played for Mets de Guaynabo.

== Personal life ==
Del Valle came out as gay in May 2020 “in hopes that it will inspire other queer athletes to do the same”.
