= 2008 FIVB Volleyball World League =

International sport competition

2008 World League
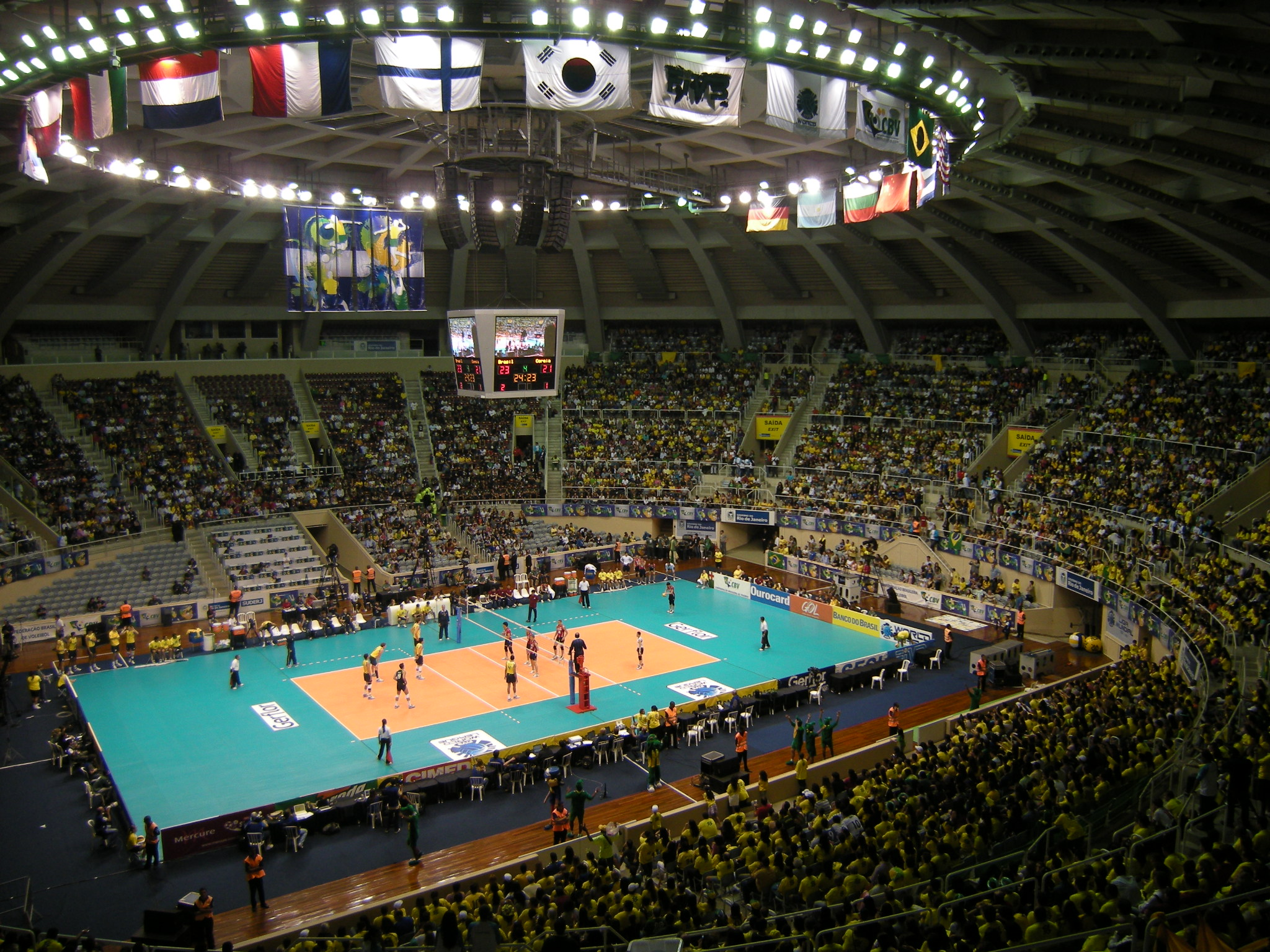
- The final round was held at Maracanãzinho

Tournament details
- Host country: Brazil (Final)
- Dates: 13 June – 27 July
- Teams: 16
- Venues: 41 (in 41 host cities)

Final positions
- Champions: United States (1st title)

Tournament awards
- MVP: (United States) Lloy Ball

The 2008 FIVB Volleyball World League was the 19th edition of the annual men's international volleyball tournament, played by 16 countries from 13 June to 27 July 2008. The Final Round was held in Rio de Janeiro, Brazil.

== Pools composition ==
Pool A	Pool B	Pool C	Pool D
Brazil; France; Serbia; Venezuela	Russia; Cuba; South Korea; Italy	United States; Bulgaria; Spain; Finland	Poland; Japan; China; Egypt

== Intercontinental round ==
- The Final Round hosts Brazil, the winners of each pool and a wild card chosen by the FIVB will qualify for the Final Round. If Brazil are ranked first in Pool A, the team ranked second of Pool A will qualify for the Final Round.

=== Pool A ===
Pos	Team	Pld	W	L	Pts	SW	SL	SR	SPW	SPL	SPR	Qualification
1	Brazil (Note: Qualified as hosts) (H)	12	10	2	22	34	14	2.429	1119	1003	1.116	Final round
2	Serbia	12	7	5	19	29	21	1.381	1108	1078	1.028	Final round
3	France	12	6	6	18	21	25	0.840	1020	1041	0.980	
4	Venezuela	12	1	11	13	10	34	0.294	937	1062	0.882	

(H) Host
Notes:

Date		Score		Set 1	Set 2	Set 3	Set 4	Set 5	Total	Report
14 Jun	Brazil	3–2	Serbia	22–25	25–23	25–18	23–25	15–11	110–102	P2 P3
14 Jun	Venezuela	2–3	France	23–25	25–23	20–25	25–23	11–15	104–111	P2 P3
15 Jun	Brazil	3–2	Serbia	23–25	25–19	24–26	25–23	15–11	112–104	P2 P3
15 Jun	Venezuela	0–3	France	22–25	19–25	25–27			66–77	P2 P3
20 Jun	France	3–2	Brazil	25–22	23–25	25–23	22–25	15–13	110–108	P2 P3
21 Jun	France	0–3	Brazil	29–31	21–25	17–25			67–81	P2 P3
21 Jun	Venezuela	3–1	Serbia	25–20	19–25	25–23	25–22		94–90	P2 P3
22 Jun	Venezuela	0–3	Serbia	21–25	21–25	18–25			60–75	P2 P3
27 Jun	France	3–1	Serbia	17–25	25–20	25–23	25–20		92–88	P2 P3
28 Jun	France	0–3	Serbia	20–25	31–33	19–25			70–83	P2 P3
28 Jun	Venezuela	1–3	Brazil	25–16	22–25	21–25	19–25		87–91	P2 P3
29 Jun	Venezuela	1–3	Brazil	25–23	29–31	13–25	20–25		87–104	P2 P3
4 Jul	Serbia	2–3	Brazil	25–17	25–21	21–25	21–25	8–15	100–103	P2 P3
4 Jul	France	3–1	Venezuela	25–23	25–13	20–25	25–18		95–79	P2 P3
5 Jul	France	3–1	Venezuela	25–20	20–25	25–20	25–22		95–87	P2 P3
6 Jul	Serbia	3–2	Brazil	20–25	18–25	25–23	25–20	15–11	103–104	P2 P3
11 Jul	Serbia	3–0	Venezuela	25–22	25–23	25–16			75–61	P2 P3
12 Jul	Brazil	3–0	France	25–22	25–17	27–25			77–64	P2 P3
13 Jul	Brazil	3–0	France	25–17	25–21	25–19			75–57	P2 P3
13 Jul	Serbia	3–1	Venezuela	18–25	25–20	27–25	25–20		95–90	P2 P3
18 Jul	Brazil	3–0	Venezuela	25–23	25–16	29–27			79–66	P2 P3
18 Jul	Serbia	3–2	France	23–25	18–25	25–21	25–19	15–8	106–98	P2 P3
19 Jul	Brazil	3–0	Venezuela	25–19	25–20	25–17			75–56	P2 P3
19 Jul	Serbia	3–1	France	25–20	25–22	12–25	25–17		87–84	P2 P3

=== Pool B ===
Pos	Team	Pld	W	L	Pts	SW	SL	SR	SPW	SPL	SPR	Qualification
1	Russia	12	10	2	22	33	17	1.941	1173	1110	1.057	Final round
2	Italy	12	8	4	20	30	22	1.364	1220	1177	1.037	
3	Cuba	12	5	7	17	21	27	0.778	1093	1094	0.999	
4	South Korea	12	1	11	13	17	35	0.486	1097	1202	0.913	

Date		Score		Set 1	Set 2	Set 3	Set 4	Set 5	Total	Report
13 Jun	Cuba	3–2	Italy	25–22	31–33	25–20	22–25	17–15	120–115	P2 P3
14 Jun	South Korea	2–3	Russia	29–31	25–16	25–18	23–25	14–16	116–106	P2 P3
14 Jun	Cuba	1–3	Italy	24–26	27–29	26–24	20–25		97–104	P2 P3
15 Jun	South Korea	1–3	Russia	25–22	19–25	22–25	21–25		87–97	P2 P3
20 Jun	Cuba	1–3	Russia	25–21	21–25	20–25	21–25		87–96	P2 P3
21 Jun	South Korea	2–3	Italy	25–23	21–25	25–22	17–25	11–15	99–110	P2 P3
21 Jun	Cuba	0–3	Russia	17–25	21–25	22–25			60–75	P2 P3
22 Jun	South Korea	2–3	Italy	25–23	25–22	15–25	19–25	9–15	93–110	P2 P3
26 Jun	Italy	3–1	Russia	27–25	25–23	24–26	25–21		101–95	P2 P3
27 Jun	Cuba	3–1	South Korea	25–13	23–25	25–22	25–15		98–75	P2 P3
28 Jun	Italy	1–3	Russia	24–26	25–19	22–25	20–25		91–95	P2 P3
28 Jun	Cuba	3–0	South Korea	25–22	25–23	25–19			75–64	P2 P3
4 Jul	Russia	3–1	Cuba	25–21	25–22	22–25	25–22		97–90	P2 P3
4 Jul	Italy	3–1	South Korea	22–25	28–26	25–20	25–23		100–94	P2 P3
5 Jul	Russia	3–1	Cuba	25–17	18–25	25–20	25–20		93–82	P2 P3
5 Jul	Italy	3–1	South Korea	23–25	25–20	25–22	25–22		98–89	P2 P3
11 Jul	Russia	3–1	Italy	25–27	25–21	25–22	25–20		100–90	P2 P3
12 Jul	South Korea	1–3	Cuba	25–21	23–25	18–25	19–25		85–96	P2 P3
12 Jul	Russia	3–2	Italy	25–20	24–26	27–29	25–22	15–12	116–109	P2 P3
13 Jul	South Korea	2–3	Cuba	16–25	25–22	25–22	20–25	12–15	98–109	P2 P3
18 Jul	Russia	3–1	South Korea	22–25	25–23	25–23	26–24		98–95	P2 P3
18 Jul	Italy	3–1	Cuba	21–25	25–23	25–21	25–21		96–90	P2 P3
19 Jul	Russia	2–3	South Korea	25–20	25–17	19–25	23–25	13–15	105–102	P2 P3
20 Jul	Italy	3–1	Cuba	25–20	21–25	25–21	25–23		96–89	P2 P3

=== Pool C ===
Pos	Team	Pld	W	L	Pts	SW	SL	SR	SPW	SPL	SPR	Qualification
1	United States	12	9	3	21	32	15	2.133	1105	982	1.125	Final round
2	Bulgaria	12	8	4	20	29	21	1.381	1122	1105	1.015	
3	Finland	12	4	8	16	19	30	0.633	1057	1129	0.936	
4	Spain	12	3	9	15	17	31	0.548	1030	1098	0.938	

Date		Score		Set 1	Set 2	Set 3	Set 4	Set 5	Total	Report
13 Jun	Finland	1–3	United States	18–25	19–25	25–23	20–25		82–98	P2 P3
14 Jun	Bulgaria	3–0	Spain	33–31	25–19	25–17			83–67	P2 P3
14 Jun	Finland	0–3	United States	20–25	19–25	16–25			55–75	P2 P3
15 Jun	Bulgaria	3–1	Spain	19–25	25–18	25–22	25–13		94–78	P2 P3
20 Jun	United States	3–0	Bulgaria	25–23	25–16	25–16			75–55	P2 P3
21 Jun	Spain	3–2	Finland	21–25	19–25	25–19	25–20	15–10	105–99	P2 P3
21 Jun	United States	2–3	Bulgaria	25–12	16–25	20–25	25–12	13–15	99–89	P2 P3
22 Jun	Spain	3–1	Finland	25–18	26–24	21–25	25–22		97–89	P2 P3
27 Jun	Spain	3–1	Bulgaria	25–16	18–25	25–21	25–16		93–78	P2 P3
27 Jun	United States	3–1	Finland	25–20	21–25	25–17	25–20		96–82	P2 P3
28 Jun	United States	3–1	Finland	25–17	22–25	25–18	25–18		97–78	P2 P3
29 Jun	Spain	2–3	Bulgaria	25–17	27–29	25–15	23–25	10–15	110–101	P2 P3
4 Jul	Finland	0–3	Bulgaria	26–28	28–30	19–25			73–83	P2 P3
4 Jul	Spain	2–3	United States	23–25	22–25	31–29	25–20	16–18	117–117	P2 P3
5 Jul	Finland	3–2	Bulgaria	22–25	17–25	25–22	25–21	17–15	106–108	P2 P3
6 Jul	Spain	0–3	United States	19–25	19–25	23–25			61–75	P2 P3
11 Jul	United States	3–0	Spain	25–19	25–23	27–25			77–67	P2 P3
12 Jul	Bulgaria	2–3	Finland	28–30	25–18	23–25	29–27	15–17	120–117	P2 P3
12 Jul	United States	3–1	Spain	24–26	25–22	25–13	25–18		99–79	P2 P3
13 Jul	Bulgaria	3–1	Finland	26–24	25–19	18–25	25–22		94–90	P2 P3
18 Jul	Bulgaria	3–2	United States	25–22	24–26	25–16	23–25	15–10	112–99	P2 P3
18 Jul	Finland	3–2	Spain	25–21	23–25	23–25	25–23	15–11	111–105	P2 P3
19 Jul	Bulgaria	3–1	United States	25–20	20–25	25–20	35–33		105–98	P2 P3
19 Jul	Finland	3–0	Spain	25–17	25–15	25–19			75–51	P2 P3

=== Pool D ===
Pos	Team	Pld	W	L	Pts	SW	SL	SR	SPW	SPL	SPR	Qualification
1	Poland	12	9	3	21	32	17	1.882	1124	1033	1.088	Final round
2	China	12	6	6	18	24	23	1.043	1058	1067	0.992	
3	Japan (Note: Qualified as wild card)	12	5	7	17	22	28	0.786	1108	1150	0.963	Final round
4	Egypt	12	4	8	16	18	28	0.643	1020	1060	0.962	

Notes:

Date		Score		Set 1	Set 2	Set 3	Set 4	Set 5	Total	Report
13 Jun	Egypt	3–2	Poland	25–19	14–25	22–25	25–22	15–12	101–103	P2 P3
14 Jun	China	2–3	Japan	31–29	22–25	20–25	31–29	9–15	113–123	P2 P3
14 Jun	Egypt	1–3	Poland	20–25	25–13	17–25	21–25		83–88	P2 P3
15 Jun	China	3–2	Japan	22–25	25–16	25–19	22–25	15–12	109–97	P2 P3
20 Jun	Egypt	3–1	Japan	30–32	25–21	25–22	25–21		105–96	P2 P3
21 Jun	China	3–1	Poland	26–24	25–21	22–25	25–18		98–88	P2 P3
21 Jun	Egypt	3–1	Japan	21–25	26–24	25–18	25–21		97–88	P2 P3
22 Jun	China	2–3	Poland	26–24	15–25	25–22	19–25	12–15	97–111	P2 P3
28 Jun	Japan	0–3	Poland	14–25	12–25	22–25			48–75	P2 P3
28 Jun	China	3–1	Egypt	25–22	25–19	20–25	25–23		95–89	P2 P3
29 Jun	Japan	3–2	Poland	29–31	18–25	25–19	25–21	15–11	112–107	P2 P3
29 Jun	China	3–0	Egypt	25–21	26–24	25–19			76–64	P2 P3
4 Jul	Poland	3–1	China	25–20	20–25	25–23	25–23		95–91	P2 P3
5 Jul	Japan	3–2	Egypt	25–19	25–22	27–29	24–26	15–10	116–106	P2 P3
5 Jul	Poland	3–1	China	25–22	19–25	25–21	25–23		94–91	P2 P3
6 Jul	Japan	3–1	Egypt	26–24	20–25	25–20	25–20		96–89	P2 P3
11 Jul	Egypt	0–3	China	18–25	21–25	23–25			62–75	P2 P3
11 Jul	Poland	3–1	Japan	21–25	25–23	25–18	25–18		96–84	P2 P3
12 Jul	Egypt	3–0	China	25–15	25–22	25–17			75–54	P2 P3
12 Jul	Poland	3–1	Japan	25–14	25–23	19–25	25–17		94–79	P2 P3
18 Jul	Poland	3–0	Egypt	25–21	25–21	25–16			75–58	P2 P3
19 Jul	Japan	3–0	China	26–24	25–20	25–13			76–57	P2 P3
19 Jul	Poland	3–1	Egypt	25–20	25–23	23–25	25–23		98–91	P2 P3
20 Jul	Japan	1–3	China	20–25	21–25	29–27	23–25		93–102	P2 P3

== Final round ==
- Venue: Ginásio do Maracanãzinho, Rio de Janeiro, Brazil
- All times are Brasília Time (UTC−03:00).

=== Pool play ===
==== Pool E ====
Pos	Team	Pld	W	L	Pts	SW	SL	SR	SPW	SPL	SPR	Qualification
1	Brazil	2	2	0	4	6	0	MAX	150	110	1.364	Semifinals
2	Russia	2	1	1	3	3	3	1.000	132	131	1.008	Semifinals
3	Japan	2	0	2	2	0	6	0.000	110	151	0.728	

Date	Time		Score		Set 1	Set 2	Set 3	Set 4	Set 5	Total	Report
23 Jul	10:10	Russia	0–3	Brazil	23–25	18–25	15–25			56–75	P2 P3
24 Jul	10:07	Japan	0–3	Russia	14–25	24–26	18–25			56–76	P2 P3
25 Jul	10:07	Brazil	3–0	Japan	25–16	25–23	25–15			75–54	P2 P3

==== Pool F ====
Pos	Team	Pld	W	L	Pts	SW	SL	SR	SPW	SPL	SPR	Qualification
1	Serbia	2	2	0	4	6	0	MAX	150	114	1.316	Semifinals
2	United States	2	1	1	3	3	5	0.600	168	182	0.923	Semifinals
3	Poland	2	0	2	2	2	6	0.333	162	184	0.880	

Date	Time		Score		Set 1	Set 2	Set 3	Set 4	Set 5	Total	Report
23 Jul	13:24	Serbia	3–0	United States	25–23	25–19	25–17			75–59	P2 P3
24 Jul	13:22	United States	3–2	Poland	25–18	23–25	27–25	18–25	16–14	109–107	P2 P3
25 Jul	13:22	Poland	0–3	Serbia	16–25	18–25	21–25			55–75	P2 P3

=== Final four ===
Semifinals
26 July
Serbia	3
Russia	0
26 July
Brazil	0
United States	3

Final
27 July
Serbia	1
United States	3
3rd place match
27 July
Russia	3
Brazil	1

==== Semifinals ====
Date	Time		Score		Set 1	Set 2	Set 3	Set 4	Set 5	Total	Report
26 Jul	10:00	Brazil	0–3	United States	23–25	22–25	25–27			70–77	P2 P3
26 Jul	13:15	Serbia	3–0	Russia	25–19	25–19	25–23			75–61	P2 P3

==== 3rd place match ====
Date	Time		Score		Set 1	Set 2	Set 3	Set 4	Set 5	Total	Report
27 Jul	09:30	Russia	3–1	Brazil	25–23	25–19	23–25	25–19		98–86	P2 P3

==== Final ====
Date	Time		Score		Set 1	Set 2	Set 3	Set 4	Set 5	Total	Report
27 Jul	12:30	Serbia	1–3	United States	24–26	25–23	23–25	22–25		94–99	P2 P3

== Final standing ==
Rank	Team
1st place, gold medalist(s)	United States
2nd place, silver medalist(s)	Serbia
3rd place, bronze medalist(s)	Russia
4	Brazil
5	Poland
6	Japan
7	Bulgaria
7	China
7	Italy
10	Cuba
10	Finland
10	France
13	Egypt
13	South Korea
13	Spain
13	Venezuela

2008 World League champions

United States
1st title

12-man roster for final round
Ball, Rooney, Lee, Lambourne, Priddy, Millar, Salmon, Hoff, Stanley, Hansen, Gardner, Touzinsky
Head coach
McCutcheon

== Awards ==
- Most valuable player
  (United States) Lloy Ball
- Best scorer
  (Serbia) Ivan Miljković
- Best spiker
  (Brazil) Dante Amaral
- Best blocker
  (Serbia) Marko Podraščanin
- Best server
  (Brazil) Gilberto Godoy Filho
- Best setter
  (United States) Lloy Ball
- Best libero
  (United States) Richard Lambourne
