= Raidel Poey =

Cuban volleyball player (born 1982)

Raydel Poey

Personal information
- Full name: Raydel Poey Romero
- Born: 20 February 1982 (age 44)
- Height: 1.98 m (6 ft 6 in)

National team
2001-2007	Cuba
Honours
Men's volleyball
Representing Cuba
World Grand Champions Cup
Gold medal – first place	2001 Japan	Team
America's Cup
Bronze medal – third place	2005 São Leopoldo	Team
NORCECA Championship
Silver medal – second place	2005 Winnipeg	Team

Raydel Poey Romero (born 20 February 1982, in Havana) is a volleyball player from Cuba, who plays in different positions. He was named Most Valuable Player at the 2005 NORCECA Championship in Winnipeg, Manitoba, Canada, where Cuba ended up in second place. Now he plays for Libertas Cantù in Italy.

== Individual awards ==
- 2005 NORCECA Championship "Most Valuable Player"
