= Alejandro Spajić =

Argentine volleyball player

Alejandro Raul Spajić Torres
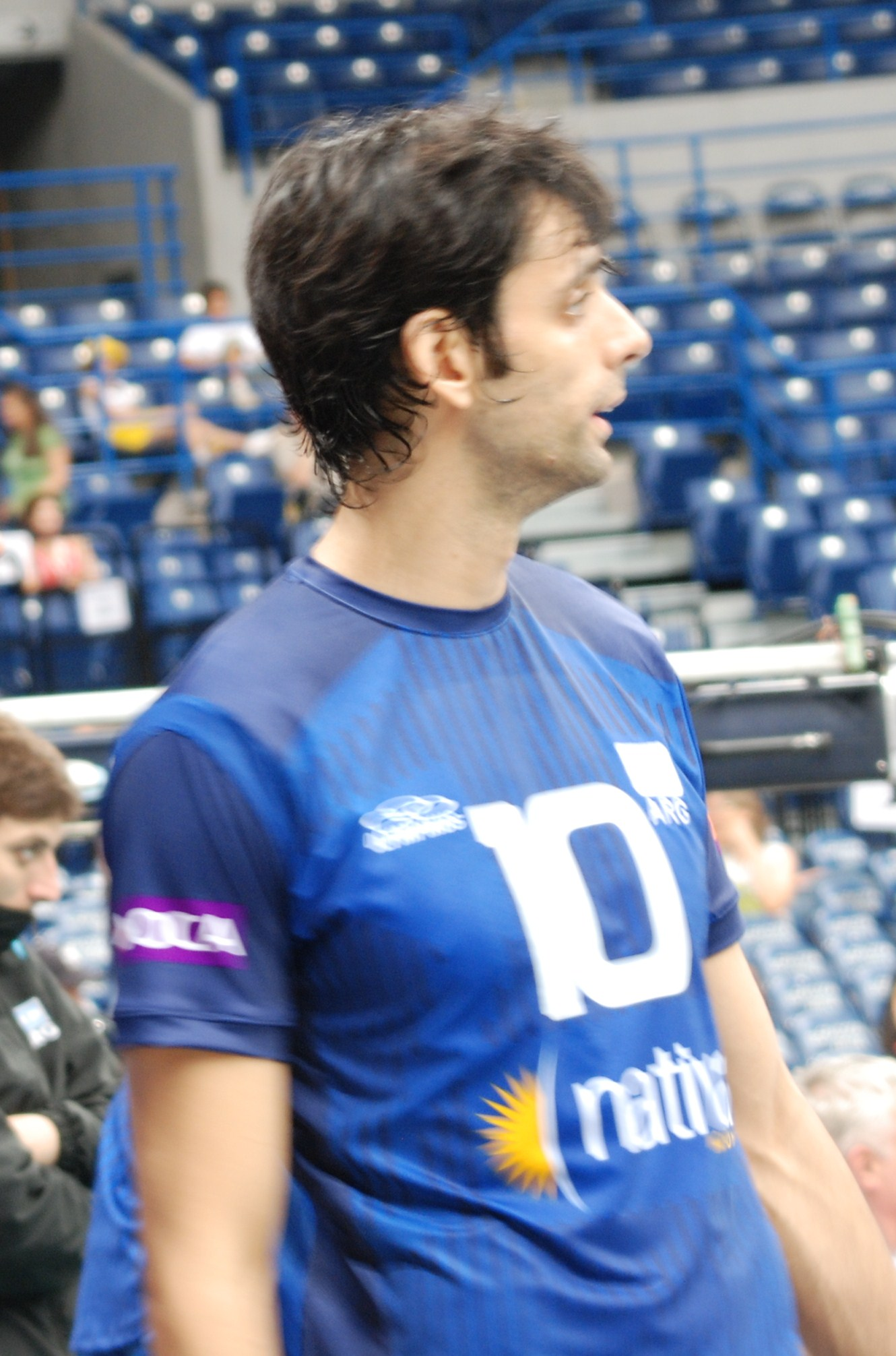

Personal information
- Full name: Alejandro Raúl Spajić Torres
- Nationality: Argentina
- Born: May 7, 1976 (age 50) San Juan, Argentina
- Home town: San Juan, Argentina
- Height: 2.04 m (6 ft 8 in)
- Weight: 95 kg (209 lb)
- Spike: 360 cm (140 in)
- Block: 340 cm (130 in)

Volleyball information
- Position: middle blocker
- Current club: (Argentina) Drean Bolivar

National team
- Years: Team
- 1994-2004: Argentina
- Updated on June 2010

Alejandro Raúl Spajić Torres (born May 7, 1976) is an Argentine volleyball player. Spajić is clearly a volleyball player both for Argentina and his club. His background is somewhat similar to another world-class volleyball player namely Marcos Milinkovic.

Alejandro Spajić's parents are immigrants of Croat origin. With the professional club Lokomotiv Belgorod, he won the bronze medal at the 2004–05 CEV Champions League and was awarded "Best Spiker".

== Clubs ==
- (Argentina) Obras San Juan (1993–2000)
- (France) Stade Poitevin Volley-Ball Poitiers (2000–2002)
- (Argentina) Obras San Juan (2002–2003)
- (Argentina) Bolívar Buenos Aires (2003–2004)
- (Russia) Lokomotiv Belgorod (2004–2006)
- (Argentina) Drean Bolívar (2009–2010)
- (Argentina) Union de Formosa (2011-actualidad)

== Awards ==
=== Individuals ===
- 2004–05 CEV Champions League "Best Spiker"

=== Clubs ===
- 1995 Argentine Championship – Champion, with Obras San Juan
- 2001 Argentine Cup – Champion, with Obras San Juan
- 2003 Argentine Championship – Champion, with Obras San Juan
- 2004–05 CEV Champions League – Bronze Medal, with Lokomotiv Belgorod
- 2005 Russian Championship – Champion, with Lokomotiv Belgorod
- 2006 Russian Cup – Champion, with Lokomotiv Belgorod
