= Jon Stanley =

American volleyball player (born 1943)

Medal record

Men's volleyball

Representing the United States

Pan American Games
Gold medal – first place	1967 Winnipeg	Team

Jon C. Stanley (born July 6, 1943, in the Bronx, New York) was an American former volleyball player who competed in the 1968 Summer Olympics.
