= 2004–05 CEV Champions League =

- League: CEV Champions League
- Sport: Volleyball
- Duration: 3 November 2004 – 27 March 2005
- Number of teams: 20

Finals
- Venue: (Greece) Thessaloniki
- Champions: (France) Tours VB
- Finals MVP: (Bulgaria) Vladimir Nikolov

CEV Champions League seasons
- ← 2003–04 2005–06 →

The 2004–05 CEV Champions League was the 46th edition of the highest level European volleyball club competition organised by the European Volleyball Confederation.

== League round ==
=== Pool A ===
Pos	Team	Pld	W	L	Pts	SW	SL	SR	SPW	SPL	SPR	Qualification
1	(Greece) Iraklis Thessaloniki (Note: Qualified as hosts) (H)	8	7	1	15	22	7	3.143	717	625	1.147	Final Four
2	(Russia) Lokomotiv Belgorod	8	5	3	13	19	2	9.500	713	692	1.030	Playoffs
3	(Germany) VfB Friedrichshafen	8	4	4	12	14	15	0.933	686	674	1.018	Playoffs
4	(Belgium) Noliko Maaseik	8	4	4	12	14	15	0.933	675	669	1.009	Playoffs
5	(Poland) Płomień Sosnowiec	8	0	8	8	8	4	2.000	558	689	0.810	

(H) Host

=== Pool B ===
Pos	Team	Pld	W	L	Pts	SW	SL	SR	SPW	SPL	SPR	Qualification
1	(Greece) Panathinaikos Athens	8	6	2	14	21	13	1.615	790	755	1.046	Playoffs
2	(Poland) Jastrzębski Węgiel	8	5	3	13	17	11	1.545	670	610	1.098	Playoffs
3	(Austria) Hotvolleys Vienna	8	5	3	13	17	17	1.000	740	762	0.971	Playoffs
4	(Bulgaria) Levski Siconco Sofia	8	3	5	11	12	17	0.706	620	662	0.937	
5	(Serbia and Montenegro) Vojvodina Novolin Novi Sad	8	1	7	9	12	21	0.571	743	765	0.971	

=== Pool C ===
Pos	Team	Pld	W	L	Pts	SW	SL	SR	SPW	SPL	SPR	Qualification
1	(France) Tours VB	8	7	1	15	22	7	3.143	695	619	1.123	Playoffs
2	(Italy) Sisley Treviso	8	6	2	14	20	10	2.000	705	645	1.093	Playoffs
3	(Germany) SCC Berlin	8	4	4	12	14	19	0.737	687	737	0.932	Playoffs
4	(Spain) Unicaja Almería	8	3	5	11	13	16	0.813	667	677	0.985	
5	(Austria) Hypo Tirol Innsbruck	8	0	8	8	7	24	0.292	655	731	0.896	

=== Pool D ===
Pos	Team	Pld	W	L	Pts	SW	SL	SR	SPW	SPL	SPR	Qualification
1	(Russia) Dynamo Moscow	8	7	1	15	22	7	3.143	699	618	1.131	Playoffs
2	(France) Paris Volley	8	5	3	13	17	14	1.214	687	705	0.974	Playoffs
3	(Italy) Copra Volley Piacenza	8	3	5	11	15	15	1.000	674	636	1.060	Playoffs
4	(Belgium) Knack Roeselare	8	3	5	11	11	15	0.733	696	740	0.941	
5	(Ukraine) Lokomotiv Kharkiv	8	2	6	10	8	20	0.400	607	664	0.914	

== Playoffs ==
=== Playoff 12 ===
Team 1	Agg.	Team 2	1st leg	2nd leg	Setpoints
Dynamo Moscow (Russia)	3–5	(Russia) Lokomotiv Belgorod	0–3	3–2	
Hotvolleys Vienna (Austria)	2–6	(Italy) Sisley Treviso	1–3	1–3	
Jastrzębski Węgiel (Poland)	1–6	(Belgium) Noliko Maaseik	0–3	1–3	
VfB Friedrichshafen (Germany)	4–4	(Greece) Panathinaikos Athens	3–1	1–3	193–185
Tours VB (France)	5–4	(Italy) Copra Volley Piacenza	3–1	2–3	
SCC Berlin (Germany)	3–6	(France) Paris Volley	1–3	2–3	

==== First leg ====
Date	Time		Score		Set 1	Set 2	Set 3	Set 4	Set 5	Total
9 Feb	19:00	Dynamo Moscow (Russia)	0–3	(Russia) Lokomotiv Belgorod	20–25	23–25	21–25			64–75
9 Feb	20:15	Hotvolleys Vienna (Austria)	1–3	(Italy) Sisley Treviso	16–25	25–23	17–25	20–25		78–98
9 Feb	18:00	Jastrzębski Węgiel (Poland)	0–3	(Belgium) Noliko Maaseik	21–25	21–25	19–25			61–75
9 Feb	20:15	VfB Friedrichshafen (Germany)	3–1	(Greece) Panathinaikos Athens	27–25	25–20	23–25	25–20		100–90
8 Feb	20:30	Tours VB (France)	3–1	(Italy) Copra Volley Piacenza	21–25	25–21	25–21	25–22		96–89
9 Feb	19:00	SCC Berlin (Germany)	1–3	(France) Paris Volley	25–22	21–25	22–25	22–25		90–97

==== Second leg ====
Date	Time		Score		Set 1	Set 2	Set 3	Set 4	Set 5	Total
15 Feb	18:00	Lokomotiv Belgorod (Russia)	2–3	(Russia) Dynamo Moscow	25–16	25–15	21–25	24–26	11–15	106–97
15 Feb	20:30	Sisley Treviso (Italy)	3–1	(Austria) Hotvolleys Vienna	25–23	25–23	22–25	25–22		97–93
15 Feb	20:30	Noliko Maaseik (Belgium)	3–1	(Poland) Jastrzębski Węgiel	25–20	22–25	25–20	25–18		97–83
16 Feb	18:00	Panathinaikos Athens (Greece)	3–1	(Germany) VfB Friedrichshafen	25–22	20–25	25–23	25–23		95–93
16 Feb	20:30	Copra Volley Piacenza (Italy)	3–2	(France) Tours VB	31–29	25–27	25–21	18–25	15–9	114–111
16 Feb	20:30	Paris Volley (France)	3–2	(Germany) SCC Berlin	20–25	25–22	25–23	23–25	16–14	109–109

=== Playoff 6 ===
Team 1	Agg.	Team 2	1st leg	2nd leg	Setpoints
Lokomotiv Belgorod (Russia)	6–2	(Italy) Sisley Treviso	3–0	3–2	
Noliko Maaseik (Belgium)	5–5	(Germany) VfB Friedrichshafen	2–3	3–2	212–213
Tours VB (France)	4–3	(France) Paris Volley	1–3	3–0	

==== First leg ====
Date	Time		Score		Set 1	Set 2	Set 3	Set 4	Set 5	Total
3 Mar	18:00	Lokomotiv Belgorod (Russia)	3–0	(Italy) Sisley Treviso	25–20	25–11	25–17			75–48
2 Mar	20:30	Noliko Maaseik (Belgium)	2–3	(Germany) VfB Friedrichshafen	23–25	18–25	25–21	25–22	10–15	101–108
1 Mar	20:30	Tours VB (France)	1–3	(France) Paris Volley	18–25	22–25	25–14	18–25		83–89

==== Second leg ====
Date	Time		Score		Set 1	Set 2	Set 3	Set 4	Set 5	Total
10 Mar	20:30	Sisley Treviso (Italy)	2–3	(Russia) Lokomotiv Belgorod	25–23	25–27	25–20	22–25	10–15	107–110
8 Mar	20:15	VfB Friedrichshafen (Germany)	2–3	(Belgium) Noliko Maaseik	25–23	20–25	22–25	25–23	13–15	105–111
9 Mar	19:00	Paris Volley (France)	0–3	(France) Tours VB	17–25	18–25	21–25			56–75

== Final Four ==
- Organizer: (Greece) Iraklis Thessaloniki
- Place: Thessaloniki
- All times on 26 March are Eastern European Time (UTC+02:00) and all times on 27 March are Eastern European Summer Time (UTC+03:00).

Semifinals
26 March
(Germany) VfB Friedrichshafen	0
(France) Tours VB	3
26 March
(Greece) Iraklis Thessaloniki	3
(Russia) Lokomotiv Belgorod	2

Final
27 March
(France) Tours VB	3
(Greece) Iraklis Thessaloniki	1
3rd place match
27 March
(Germany) VfB Friedrichshafen	0
(Russia) Lokomotiv Belgorod	3

=== Semifinals ===
Date	Time		Score		Set 1	Set 2	Set 3	Set 4	Set 5	Total
26 Mar	16:00	VfB Friedrichshafen (Germany)	0–3	(France) Tours VB	18–25	21–25	19–25			58–75
26 Mar	20:15	Iraklis Thessaloniki (Greece)	3–2	(Russia) Lokomotiv Belgorod	22–25	25–23	18–25	25–19	15–13	105–105

=== 3rd place match ===
Date	Time		Score		Set 1	Set 2	Set 3	Set 4	Set 5	Total
27 Mar	16:00	VfB Friedrichshafen (Germany)	0–3	(Russia) Lokomotiv Belgorod	19–25	18–25	22–25			59–75

=== Final ===
Date	Time		Score		Set 1	Set 2	Set 3	Set 4	Set 5	Total
27 Mar	19:00	Tours VB (France)	3–1	(Greece) Iraklis Thessaloniki	21–25	31–29	25–17	25–23		102–94

== Final standings ==
Rank	Team
1st place, gold medalist(s)	(France) Tours VB
2nd place, silver medalist(s)	(Greece) Iraklis Thessaloniki
3rd place, bronze medalist(s)	(Russia) Lokomotiv Belgorod
4	(Germany) VfB Friedrichshafen

2004–05 CEV Champions League winners
(France)
Tours VB
1st title

== Awards ==
- Most valuable player
  (Bulgaria) Vladimir Nikolov (Tours VB)
- Best scorer
  (United States) Clayton Stanley (Iraklis Thessaloniki)
- Best spiker
  (Argentina) Alejandro Spajić (Lokomotiv Belgorod)
- Best server
  (United States) Clayton Stanley (Iraklis Thessaloniki)
- Best blocker
  (Brazil) Alexandre Sloboda (Tours VB)
- Best receiver
  (Greece) Theodoros Baev (Iraklis Thessaloniki)
- Best libero
  (France) Hubert Henno (Tours VB)
- Best setter
  (United States) Lloy Ball (Iraklis Thessaloniki)
