= 2003 Men's NORCECA Volleyball Championship =

The 2003 Men's NORCECA Volleyball Championship was the 18th edition of the Men's Continental Volleyball Tournament, played by eight countries from September 25 to September 30, 2003, in Culiacan, Sinaloa (Mexico).

== Competing nations ==
Group A	Group B
Canada; Cuba; Honduras; Puerto Rico	Guatemala; Mexico; Panama; United States

== Preliminary round ==
=== Group A ===
	Team	Points	G	W	L	PW	PL	Ratio	SW	SL	Ratio
1.	Canada	4	2	2	0	192	173	1.109	6	2	3.000
2.	Cuba	3	2	1	1	191	190	1.005	5	4	1.250
3.	Puerto Rico	2	2	0	2	157	177	0.890	1	6	0.166
4.	~~Honduras~~	—	—	—	—	—	—	—	—	—	—

  - Honduras eventually did not play at the NORCECA Championship.
- Thursday 2003-09-25

Cuba	3 – 1	Puerto Rico	25-17 25-20 15-25 25-23

- Friday 2003-09-26

Canada	3 – 0	Puerto Rico	37-35 25-18 25-19

- Saturday 2003-09-27

Canada	3 – 2	Cuba	25-20 23-25 26-24 16-25 15- 7

=== Group B ===
	Team	Points	G	W	L	PW	PL	Ratio	SW	SL	Ratio
1.	United States	6	3	3	0	229	152	1.510	9	0	MAX
2.	Mexico	5	3	2	1	216	176	1.230	6	3	2.000
3.	Panama	4	3	1	2	161	199	0.810	3	6	0.500
4.	Guatemala	3	3	0	3	146	225	0.810	0	9	0.650

- Thursday 2003-09-25

United States	3 – 0	Panama	25-12 25-11 25-14
Mexico	3 – 0	Guatemala	25-20 25-10 25-18

- Friday 2003-09-26

United States	3 – 0	Guatemala	25-15 25-21 25-13
Mexico	3 – 0	Panama	25-15 25-18 25-16

- Saturday 2003-09-27

Panama	3 – 0	Guatemala	25-18 25-11 25-20
Mexico	0 – 3	United States	17-25 22-25 27-29

== Final round ==
Semi-finals
2003-09-29 – Culiacan, Sinaloa
Canada	3
Mexico	1
2003-09-29 – Culiacan, Sinaloa
United States	3
Cuba	1

Final
2003-09-30 – Culiacan, Sinaloa
Canada	1
United States	3
3rd place
2003-09-30 – Culiacan, Sinaloa
Mexico	0
Cuba	3

=== Quarterfinals ===
- Sunday 2003-09-28

Cuba	3 – 1	Panama	25-15 22-25 25-19 25- 8
Mexico	3 – 2	Puerto Rico	25-20 23-25 25-22 23-25 15-13

=== Semi-finals ===
  - Semi-finals

Canada	3 – 1	Mexico	25 -9 25-19 24-26 25-19
United States	3 – 1	Cuba	25-20 25-22 26-28 25-20

=== Finals ===
- Monday 2003-09-29 — Fifth Place Match

Puerto Rico	3 – 0	Panama	25-20 25-22 25-22

- Tuesday 2003-09-30 — Bronze Medal Match

Cuba	3 – 0	Mexico	25-18 25-19 25-16

- Tuesday 2003-09-30 — Gold Medal Match

Canada	1 – 3	United States	25-20 18-25 22-25 21-25

== Final ranking ==
Place	Team
1.	United States
2.	Canada
3.	Cuba
4.	Mexico
5.	Puerto Rico
6.	Panama
7.	Guatemala
8.	Honduras

2003 Men's NORCECA winners

United States
Fifth title

  - United States and Canada qualified for the 2003 FIVB Men's World Cup

== Individual awards ==
- Most valuable player
  - Clayton Stanley (USA)
- Best blocker
  - Murray Grapentine (CAN)
- Best setter
  - Lloy Ball (USA)
- Best Opposite
  - Raydel Contreras (CUB)
- Best server
  - Osmany Juantorena (CUB)
- Best libero
  - Lucas Zinder (CAN)
- Best digger
  - Javier Brito (CUB)
- Best receiver
  - Gregory Berrios (PUR)
