= 2005–06 CEV Champions League =

- League: CEV Champions League
- Sport: Volleyball
- Duration: 18 October 2005 – 26 March 2006
- Number of teams: 20

Finals
- Venue: (Italy) Treviso
- Champions: (Italy) Sisley Treviso
- Finals MVP: (Italy) Alessandro Fei

CEV Champions League seasons
- ← 2004–05 2006–07 →

The 2005–06 CEV Champions League was the 47th edition of the highest level European volleyball club competition organised by the European Volleyball Confederation.

== League round ==
=== Pool A ===
Pos	Team	Pld	W	L	Pts	SW	SL	SR	SPW	SPL	SPR	Qualification
1	(Greece) Iraklis Thessaloniki	8	6	2	14	22	10	2.200	752	664	1.133	Playoffs
2	(Belgium) Knack Randstad Roeselare	8	6	2	14	20	14	1.429	786	770	1.021	Playoffs
3	(Netherlands) Ortec Rotterdam Nesselande	8	4	4	12	17	14	1.214	704	689	1.022	Playoffs
4	(Austria) Hypo Tirol Innsbruck	8	2	6	10	11	20	0.550	699	716	0.976	
5	(Spain) Unicaja Almería	8	2	6	10	11	20	0.550	585	657	0.890	

=== Pool B ===
Pos	Team	Pld	W	L	Pts	SW	SL	SR	SPW	SPL	SPR	Qualification
1	(Russia) Dynamo Moscow	8	7	1	15	23	9	2.556	752	673	1.117	Playoffs
2	(France) Tours VB	8	5	3	13	19	15	1.267	810	761	1.064	Playoffs
3	(Germany) VfB Friedrichshafen	8	4	4	12	17	14	1.214	715	694	1.030	Playoffs
4	(Greece) Olympiacos Piraeus	8	3	5	11	13	18	0.722	673	723	0.931	
5	(Czech Republic) volleyball.cz Kladno	8	1	7	9	5	21	0.238	543	642	0.846	

=== Pool C ===
Pos	Team	Pld	W	L	Pts	SW	SL	SR	SPW	SPL	SPR	Qualification
1	(Italy) Sisley Treviso (Note: Qualified as hosts) (H)	8	6	2	14	21	14	1.500	903	752	1.201	Final Four
2	(Belgium) Noliko Maaseik	8	4	4	12	18	16	1.125	762	732	1.041	Playoffs
3	(France) AS Cannes	8	4	4	12	19	19	1.000	829	839	0.988	Playoffs
4	(Austria) Hotvolleys Vienna	8	3	5	11	14	20	0.700	744	772	0.964	Playoffs
5	(Germany) evivo Düren	8	3	5	11	16	19	0.842	783	826	0.948	

(H) Host

=== Pool D ===
Pos	Team	Pld	W	L	Pts	SW	SL	SR	SPW	SPL	SPR	Qualification
1	(Italy) EMU RPA Perugia	8	7	1	15	21	7	3.000	685	606	1.130	Playoffs
2	(Russia) Lokomotiv Belgorod	8	6	2	14	20	10	2.000	723	666	1.086	Playoffs
3	(Poland) BOT Skra Bełchatow	8	5	3	13	19	13	1.462	758	719	1.054	Playoffs
4	(Serbia and Montenegro) Budućnost Podgorička Banka	8	1	7	9	9	21	0.429	626	703	0.890	
5	(Bulgaria) Levski Siconco Sofia	8	1	7	9	6	23	0.261	583	681	0.856	

== Playoffs ==
=== Playoff 12 ===
Team 1	Agg.	Team 2	1st leg	2nd leg
Dynamo Moscow (Russia)	6–0	(Netherlands) Ortec Rotterdam Nesselande	3–0	3–0
Knack Randstad Roeselare (Belgium)	3–5	(France) Tours VB	3–2	0–3
Lokomotiv Belgorod (Russia)	5–3	(Germany) VfB Friedrichshafen	3–0	2–3
AS Cannes (France)	3–4	(Italy) EMU RPA Perugia	3–1	0–3
Iraklis Thessaloniki (Greece)	6–1	(Austria) Hotvolleys Vienna	3–0	3–1
BOT Skra Bełchatów (Poland)	6–3	(Belgium) Noliko Maaseik	3–1	3–2

==== First leg ====
Date	Time		Score		Set 1	Set 2	Set 3	Set 4	Set 5	Total
8 Feb	19:00	Dynamo Moscow (Russia)	3–0	(Netherlands) Ortec Rotterdam Nesselande	25–20	25–19	27–25			77–64
8 Feb	20:30	Knack Randstad Roeselare (Belgium)	3–2	(France) Tours VB	28–26	17–25	18–25	25–21	15–13	103–110
8 Feb	19:00	Lokomotiv Belgorod (Russia)	3–0	(Germany) VfB Friedrichshafen	25–16	25–17	25–21			75–54
7 Feb	20:30	AS Cannes (France)	3–1	(Italy) EMU RPA Perugia	28–26	25–20	24–26	25–23		102–95
8 Feb	20:30	Iraklis Thessaloniki (Greece)	3–0	(Austria) Hotvolleys Vienna	25–17	25–18	25–15			75–50
8 Feb	18:00	BOT Skra Bełchatów (Poland)	3–1	(Belgium) Noliko Maaseik	25–16	25–19	24–26	25–22		99–83

==== Second leg ====
Date	Time		Score		Set 1	Set 2	Set 3	Set 4	Set 5	Total
14 Feb	20:00	Ortec Rotterdam Nesselande (Netherlands)	0–3	(Russia) Dynamo Moscow	19–25	13–25	23–25			55–75
16 Feb	20:30	Tours VB (France)	3–0	(Belgium) Knack Randstad Roeselare	28–26	25–18	25–14			78–58
16 Feb	20:30	VfB Friedrichshafen (Germany)	3–2	(Russia) Lokomotiv Belgorod	25–22	29–31	23–25	25–22	15–8	117–108
15 Feb	20:30	EMU RPA Perugia (Italy)	3–2	(France) AS Cannes	25–14	25–15	25–16			75–45
16 Feb	20:15	Hotvolleys Vienna (Austria)	1–3	(Greece) Iraklis Thessaloniki	25–20	27–29	21–25	24–26		97–100
15 Feb	20:30	Noliko Maaseik (Belgium)	2–3	(Poland) BOT Skra Bełchatów	21–25	25–23	20–25	25–22	13–15	104–110

=== Playoff 6 ===
Team 1	Agg.	Team 2	1st leg	2nd leg
Dynamo Moscow (Russia)	6–2	(France) Tours VB	3–0	3–2
Lokomotiv Belgorod (Russia)	6–1	(Italy) EMU RPA Perugia	3–0	3–1
Iraklis Thessaloniki (Greece)	6–2	(Poland) BOT Skra Bełchatów	3–0	3–2

==== First leg ====
Date	Time		Score		Set 1	Set 2	Set 3	Set 4	Set 5	Total
28 Feb	19:00	Dynamo Moscow (Russia)	3–0	(France) Tours VB	25–22	25–17	27–25			77–64
2 Mar	19:00	Lokomotiv Belgorod (Russia)	3–0	(Italy) EMU RPA Perugia	25–16	25–17	25–18			75–51
1 Mar	20:30	Iraklis Thessaloniki (Greece)	3–0	(Poland) BOT Skra Bełchatów	25–22	25–19	25–17			75–58

==== Second leg ====
Date	Time		Score		Set 1	Set 2	Set 3	Set 4	Set 5	Total
8 Mar	20:30	Tours VB (France)	2–3	(Russia) Dynamo Moscow	25–23	18–25	21–25	25–18	13–15	102–106
9 Mar	20:30	EMU RPA Perugia (Italy)	1–3	(Russia) Lokomotiv Belgorod	25–22	24–26	19–25	23–25		91–98
8 Mar	18:00	BOT Skra Bełchatów (Poland)	2–3	(Greece) Iraklis Thessaloniki	25–22	26–24	22–25	22–25	10–15	105–111

== Final Four ==
- Organizer: (Italy) Sisley Treviso
- Place: Treviso
- All times on 25 March are Central European Time (UTC+01:00) and all times on 26 March are Central European Summer Time (UTC+02:00).

Semifinals
25 March
(Italy) Sisley Treviso	3
(Russia) Dynamo Moscow	0
25 March
(Russia) Lokomotiv Belgorod	2
(Greece) Iraklis Thessaloniki	3

Final
26 March
(Italy) Sisley Treviso	3
(Greece) Iraklis Thessaloniki	1
3rd place match
26 March
(Russia) Dynamo Moscow	1
(Russia) Lokomotiv Belgorod	3

=== Semifinals ===
Date	Time		Score		Set 1	Set 2	Set 3	Set 4	Set 5	Total
25 Mar	17:00	Sisley Treviso (Italy)	3–0	(Russia) Dynamo Moscow	25–20	25–14	25–21			75–55
25 Mar	19:30	Lokomotiv Belgorod (Russia)	2–3	(Greece) Iraklis Thessaloniki	24–26	25–23	25–22	23–25	13–15	110–111

=== 3rd place match ===
Date	Time		Score		Set 1	Set 2	Set 3	Set 4	Set 5	Total
26 Mar	14:30	Dynamo Moscow (Russia)	1–3	(Russia) Lokomotiv Belgorod	19–25	25–21	20–25	20–25		84–96

=== Final ===
Date	Time		Score		Set 1	Set 2	Set 3	Set 4	Set 5	Total
26 Mar	17:30	Sisley Treviso (Italy)	3–1	(Greece) Iraklis Thessaloniki	25–23	23–25	25–23	26–24		99–95

== Final standings ==
Rank	Team
1st place, gold medalist(s)	(Italy) Sisley Treviso
2nd place, silver medalist(s)	(Greece) Iraklis Thessaloniki
3rd place, bronze medalist(s)	(Russia) Lokomotiv Belgorod
4	(Russia) Dynamo Moscow

2005–06 CEV Champions League winners
(Italy)
Sisley Treviso
4th title

== Awards ==
- Most valuable player
  (Italy) Alessandro Fei (Sisley Treviso)
- Best scorer
  (United States) Clayton Stanley (Iraklis Thessaloniki)
- Best spiker
  (United States) Thomas Hoff (Iraklis Thessaloniki)
- Best server
  (Italy) Alessandro Fei (Sisley Treviso)
- Best blocker
  (Brazil) Gustavo Endres (Sisley Treviso)
- Best libero
  (Russia) Aleksey Verbov (Lokomotiv Belgorod)
- Best setter
  (Italy) Valerio Vermiglio (Sisley Treviso)
