= 2005 Men's NORCECA Volleyball Championship =

The 2005 Men's NORCECA Volleyball Championship was the 19th edition of the Men's Continental Volleyball Tournament, played by eight countries in the NORCECA zone, which encompasses North America, Central America and the Caribbean, from September 8 to September 16, 2005, in the MTS Centre in Winnipeg, Manitoba (Canada).

== Competing nations ==
Pool A	Pool B
Barbados; Mexico; Puerto Rico; United States	Canada; Cuba; Dominican Republic; Panama

== Preliminary round ==
=== Group A ===
	Team	Points	G	W	L	PW	PL	Ratio	SW	SL	Ratio
1.	United States	6	3	3	0				9	0	MAX
2.	Puerto Rico	5	3	2	1				6	4	1.500
3.	Mexico	4	3	1	2				4	6	0.666
4.	Barbados	3	3	0	3				0	9	0.000

- Saturday September 10

Puerto Rico	3 – 0	Barbados	25-20 25-23 25-18
United States	3 – 0	Mexico	25-15 25-14 25-12

- Sunday September 11

Puerto Rico	3 – 1	Mexico	27-25 26-24 18-25 25-23
United States	3 – 0	Barbados	25-11 25-12 25-08

- Monday September 12

United States	3 – 0	Puerto Rico	25-16 25-16 25-18
Mexico	3 – 0	Barbados	25-17 25-21 25-18

=== Group B ===
	Team	Points	G	W	L	PW	PL	Ratio	SW	SL	Ratio
1.	Cuba	6	3	3	0				9	2	4.500
2.	Dominican R.	5	3	2	1				8	5	1.600
3.	Canada	4	3	1	2				5	6	0.833
4.	Panama	3	3	0	3				0	9	0.000

- Saturday September 10

Cuba	3 – 2	Dominican R.	25-18 18-25 25-20 17-25 15-10
Canada	3 – 0	Panama	25-12 25-22 25-18

- Sunday September 11

Dominican R.	3 – 2	Canada	19-25 25-19 29-31 26-24 19-17
Cuba	3 – 0	Panama	25-16 25-15 25-10

- Monday September 12

Dominican R.	3 – 0	Panama	25-13 25-17 25-09
Cuba	3 – 0	Canada	25-22 25-23 25-18

== Final round ==
Semi-finals
2005-09-14 – Winnipeg, Manitoba
United States	3
Dominican Republic	0
2005-09-14 – Winnipeg, Manitoba
Cuba	3
Canada	0

Final
2005-09-15 – Winnipeg, Manitoba
United States	3
Cuba	1
3rd place
2005-09-15 – Winnipeg, Manitoba
Dominican Republic	0
Canada	3

=== Quarter-finals ===
- Tuesday 2005-09-13

Dominican R.	3 – 1	Mexico	25-22 21-25 28-26 25-23
Canada	3 – 0	Puerto Rico	25-15 25-20 25-14

=== Semi-finals ===
- Wednesday 2005-09-14

United States	3 – 0	Dominican R.	25-13 25-17 25-15
Cuba	3 – 0	Canada	25-20 25-20 25-22

=== Finals ===
- Thursday 2005-09-15 — Bronze Medal Match

Dominican R.	0 – 3	Canada	22-25 19-25 13-25

- Thursday 2005-09-15 — Gold Medal Match

United States	3 – 1	Cuba	25-22 25-27 25-23 25-22

== Final ranking ==
Place	Team
1.	United States
2.	Cuba
3.	Canada
4.	Dominican Republic
5.	Puerto Rico
6.	Mexico
7.	Panama
8.	Barbados

2005 Men's NORCECA winners

United States
Sixth title

  - United States qualified for the 2005 Men's Volleyball Grand Champions Cup

== Awards ==
- Most valuable player
  - Raidel Poey (CUB)
- Best scorer
  - Elvis Contreras (DOM)
- Best spiker
  - José Miguel Cáceres (DOM)
- Best defender
  - Amaury Martínez (DOM)
- Best blocker
  - Ryan Millar (USA)
- Best server
  - Donald Suxho (USA)
- Best setter
  - Scott Koskie (CAN)
- Best receiver
  - Domingo Avila (PAN)
- Best libero
  - Amaury Martínez (DOM)
