= Pro Volleyball League =

Indian professional volleyball league

- Most recent season or competition: 2019 Pro Volleyball League
- Sport: Volleyball
- First season: 2019
- Replaced by: Prime Volleyball League
- CEO: Joy Bhattacharjya
- Administrator: Volleyball Federation of India; Head Digital Works Pvt. Ltd. Baseline Ventures
- No. of teams: 6
- Country: India
- Venues: Rajiv Gandhi Indoor Stadium; Jawaharlal Nehru Indoor Stadium
- Most recent champion: Chennai Spartans
- Broadcaster: Sony Pictures Networks India
- Website: provolleyball.in

Pro Volleyball League (PVL) was a professional men's indoor volleyball league in India. The inaugural season took place in February 2019. The league was an initiative between the Volleyball Federation of India, Head Digital Works Pvt. Ltd. and Baseline Ventures. The inaugural season of the league was won by the Chennai Spartans. In June 2022, the league was rebranded as Prime Volleyball League.

== Structure ==
The Pro Volleyball League encompassed six franchises, representing cities across India. All teams filed tenders with Baseline Ventures, listing the two cities they would be interested in bidding for. The teams were officially announced at a press conference in Mumbai.

== Teams ==
Locations of Pro Volleyball League teams

City	Team name	International players	Team owner
Ahmedabad	Ahmedabad Defenders	Novica Bjelica and Victor Sysoev	Bonhomie Sports Event Management Limited
Kozhikode	Calicut Heroes	Paul Lotman and Iluoni Ngampourou	Beacon Sports
Chennai	Chennai Spartans	Rudy Verhoeff and Ruslans Sorokins	Chennai Spartans Sports Private Limited
Hyderabad	Black Hawks Hyderabad	Carson Clark and Alexander Bader	Agile Entertainment Private Limited
Kochi	Kochi Blue Spikers	David Lee and Andrej Patuc	Thomas Muthoot
Mumbai	U Mumba Volley	Tomislav Coskovic and Nicholas Del Bianco	U Sports

== Format ==
Each team will have 12 players with a maximum of two reserve players. All teams have a salary purse of ₹75 lakhs from which they pick their team via an auction and player draft. Players are divided into five categories – International Icons, Indian Icons, Sr. Indian Internationals, Nationals, and U-21 players. The International Icon players are picked through a draft process while the Indian players are chosen via an auction. Ranjit Singh of Punjab emerged as the top pick in Season 1. Ahmedabad Defenders shelled out ₹13 lakhs for him at the auction.

There were a total of 18 matches in Season 1. Each team plays against each other in a round-robin format with the top 4 teams moving into the Semi-Finals. In Season 1, matches were held in Kochi at the Rajiv Gandhi Indoor Stadium and in Chennai at the Jawaharlal Nehru Stadium.

== Season 1 ==
The first season started on 2 February 2019 and concluded on 22 February 2019.

=== Fixtures ===
Date	Venue	Phase	Fixture	Winner	Result	Man of the match
02-Feb-19	Rajiv Gandhi Stadium, Kochi	Matchday 1 - Round Robin	Kochi Blue Spikers Vs U Mumba Volley	Kochi	4-1	Mohan Ukkrapandian
03-Feb-19	Rajiv Gandhi Stadium, Kochi	Matchday 2 - Round Robin	Calicut Heroes Vs Chennai Spartans	Calicut	4-1	Ajith Lal C
04-Feb-19	Rajiv Gandhi Stadium, Kochi	Matchday 3 - Round Robin	Ahmedabad Defenders Vs Blackhawks Hyderabad	Hyderabad	2-3	Carson Clark
05-Feb-19	Rajiv Gandhi Stadium, Kochi	Matchday 4 - Round Robin	Calicut Heroes Vs U Mumba Volley	Calicut	3-2	Saqlain Tariq
06-Feb-19	Rajiv Gandhi Stadium, Kochi	Matchday 5 - Round Robin	Kochi Blue Spikers Vs Ahmedabad Defenders	Kochi	3-2	Mohan Ukkrapandian
07-Feb-19	Rajiv Gandhi Stadium, Kochi	Matchday 6 - Round Robin	Chennai Spartans Vs Blackhawks Hyderabad	Chennai	4-1	Naveen Raja Jacob
08-Feb-19	Rajiv Gandhi Stadium, Kochi	Matchday 7 - Round Robin	Kochi Blue Spikers Vs Blackhawks Hyderabad	Kochi	3-2	David Lee
09-Feb-19	Rajiv Gandhi Stadium, Kochi	Matchday 8 - Round Robin	Kochi Blue Spikers Vs Calicut Heroes	Calicut	0-5	Paul Lotman
10-Feb-19	Rajiv Gandhi Stadium, Kochi	Matchday 9 - Round Robin	Calicut Heroes Vs Blackhawks Hyderabad	Calicut	3-2	Kamlesh Khatik
11-Feb-19	Rajiv Gandhi Stadium, Kochi	Matchday 10 - Round Robin	Kochi Blue Spikers Vs Chennai Spartans	Kochi	3-2	David Lee
12-Feb-19	Rajiv Gandhi Stadium, Kochi	Matchday 11 - Round Robin	U Mumba Volley Vs Blackhawks Hyderabad	Hyderabad	2-3	Carson Clark
13-Feb-19	Rajiv Gandhi Stadium, Kochi	Matchday 12 - Round Robin	Calicut Heroes Vs Ahmedabad Defenders	Calicut	4-1	Paul Lotman
16-Feb-19	Nehru Indoor Stadium, Chennai	Matchday 13 - Round Robin	Chennai Spartans Vs U Mumba Volley	Mumbai	2-3	Deepesh Sinha
17-Feb-19	Nehru Indoor Stadium, Chennai	Matchday 14 - Round Robin	Chennai Spartans Vs Ahmedabad Defenders	Chennai	4-1	Rudy Verhoeff
18-Feb-19	Nehru Indoor Stadium, Chennai	Matchday 15 - Round Robin	U Mumba Volley Vs Ahmedabad Defenders	Mumbai	4-1	Vinit Kumar
19-Feb-19	Nehru Indoor Stadium, Chennai	Matchday 16 - Semi Final 1	Calicut Heroes Vs U Mumba Volley	Calicut	3-0	Jerome Vinith
20-Feb-19	Nehru Indoor Stadium, Chennai	Matchday 17 - Semi Final 2	Kochi Blue Spikers Vs Chennai Spartans	Chennai	2-3	Ruslans Sorokin
22-Feb-19	Nehru Indoor Stadium, Chennai	Matchday 18 - Final	Calicut Heroes Vs Chennai Spartans	Chennai	0-3	Naveen Raja Jacob

== See also ==
- Prime Volleyball League
- Indian Volley League
