= 2019 Pro Volleyball League =

- League: Pro Volleyball League
- Sport: Men's volleyball
- Duration: February 2, 2019 – February 22, 2019
- Teams: 6

Regular season
- Season MVP: Ajith Lal C (Calicut Heroes)
- Top scorer: Rudy Verhoeff (Chennai Spartans)

Finals
- Champions: Chennai Spartans
- Runners-up: Calicut Heroes
- Finals MVP: Naveen Raja Jacob (Chennai Spartans)

Pro Volleyball League seasons
- 2022 Prime Volleyball League

2019 Pro Volleyball League is the inaugural season of the Indian Indoor Volleyball League known as Pro Volleyball League organized under the supervision of Volleyball Federation of India in association with Baseline Ventures.This season was composed of six teams. The league is approved by FIVB. The inaugural season was won by Chennai Spartans.

== Teams ==
City	Team Name	International Players	Team Owner
Ahmedabad	Ahmedabad Defenders	Novica Bjelica and Victor Sysoev	Bonhomie Sports Event Management Limited
Calicut	Calicut Heroes	Paul Lotman and Iluoni Ngampourou	Beacon Sports
Chennai	Chennai Spartans	Rudy Verhoeff and Ruslans Sorokins	Chennai Spartans Sports Private Limited
Hyderabad	Black Hawks Hyderabad	Carson Clark and Alexander Bader	Agile Entertainment Private Limited
Kochi	Kochi Blue Spikers	David Lee and Andrej Patuc	Thomas Muthoot
Mumbai	U Mumba Volley	Tomislav Coskovic and Nicholas Del Bianco	U Sports

== Regular season ==
Pos	Team	Pld	W	L	Pts	SW	SL	SR	SPW	SPL	SPR	Qualification
1	Calicut Heroes	5	5	0	11	19	6	3.167	358	288	1.243	Play–offs
2	Kochi Blue Spikers	5	4	1	8	13	12	1.083	326	324	1.006	Play–offs
3	Chennai Spartans	5	2	3	4	13	12	1.083	325	322	1.009	Play–offs
4	U Mumba Volley	5	2	3	4	12	13	0.923	320	323	0.991	Play–offs
5	Black Hawks Hyderabad	5	2	3	4	11	14	0.786	319	339	0.941	
6	Ahmedabad Defenders	5	0	5	0	7	18	0.389	300	352	0.852	

=== Results ===
Date	Time		Score		Set 1	Set 2	Set 3	Set 4	Set 5	Total	Report
2 Feb	19:00	Kochi Blue Spikers	4–1	U Mumba Volley	15–11	15–13	15–8	15–10	5–15	65–57	
3 Feb	19:00	Calicut Heroes	4–1	Chennai Spartans	15–8	15–8	13–15	15–11	15–11	73–53	
4 Feb	19:00	Black Hawks Hyderabad	3–2	Ahmedabad Defenders	15–11	13–15	15–11	14–15	15–9	72–61	
5 Feb	19:00	Calicut Heroes	3–2	U Mumba Volley	15–10	12–15	15–13	14–15	15–9	71–62	
6 Feb	19:00	Kochi Blue Spikers	3–2	Ahmedabad Defenders	10–15	15–11	11–15	15–12	15–12	66–65	
7 Feb	19:00	Chennai Spartans	4–1	Black Hawks Hyderabad	15–12	15–12	15–11	15–10	13–15	73–60	
8 Feb	19:00	Kochi Blue Spikers	3–2	Black Hawks Hyderabad	12–15	15–11	15–12	15–10	14–15	71–63	
9 Feb	19:00	Calicut Heroes	5–0	Kochi Blue Spikers	15–11	15–9	15–14	15–13	15–10	75–57	
10 Feb	19:00	Calicut Heroes	3–2	Black Hawks Hyderabad	15–11	15–11	15–7	12–15	11–15	68–59	
11 Feb	19:00	Kochi Blue Spikers	3–2	Chennai Spartans	12–15	10–15	15–11	15–13	15–10	67–64	
12 Feb	19:00	Black Hawks Hyderabad	3–2	U Mumba Volley	13–15	15–11	7–15	15–14	15–11	65–66	
13 Feb	19:00	Calicut Heroes	4–1	Ahmedabad Defenders	15–14	11–15	15–11	15–9	15–8	71–57	
16 Feb	19:00	Chennai Spartans	2–3	U Mumba Volley	14–15	8–15	10–15	15–10	15–10	62–65	
17 Feb	19:00	Chennai Spartans	4–1	Ahmedabad Defenders	15–6	13–15	15–13	15–11	15–12	73–57	
18 Feb	19:00	U Mumba Volley	4–1	Ahmedabad Defenders	10–15	15–12	15–13	15–12	15–8	70–60	

== Play–offs ==
=== Semifinals ===
Top four teams of Regular season are qualified to two different semifinal pairs.

==== Semifinal 1 ====
Date	Time		Score		Set 1	Set 2	Set 3	Set 4	Set 5	Total	Report
19 Feb	19:00	Calicut Heroes	3–0	U Mumba Volley	15–12	15–9	16–14	–	–	46–35	

==== Semifinal 2 ====
Date	Time		Score		Set 1	Set 2	Set 3	Set 4	Set 5	Total	Report
20 Feb	19:00	Kochi Blue Spikers	2–3	Chennai Spartans	14–16	15–9	15–10	8–15	13–15	65–65	

==== Final ====
Date	Time		Score		Set 1	Set 2	Set 3	Set 4	Set 5	Total	Report
22 Feb	19:00	Calicut Heroes	0–3	Chennai Spartans	11–15	12–15	14–16	–	–	37–46	

== Final standing ==
Rank	Team
1st place, gold medalist(s)	Chennai Spartans
2nd place, silver medalist(s)	Calicut Heroes
3rd place, bronze medalist(s)	Kochi Blue Spikers
4	U Mumba Volley
5	Black Hawks Hyderabad
6	Ahmedabad Defenders

- Qualified for Asian Men's Club Volleyball Championship

2019 Champions

Maiden title

Team Roster
Rudy Verhoeff, Naveen Raja Jacob, Vibin M George, Piraisoodan, Ruslans Sorokins, Shelton Moses(c), Akhin G. S., Shikar Singh, Ashwin Raj, K. J. Kapil Dev, V. Hariharan, Prabhakaran
Head coach
M. H. Kumara
