= 2023 Prime Volleyball League =

- League: Prime Volleyball League
- Sport: Men's volleyball
- Duration: 4 February – 5 March 2023
- Teams: 8
- TV partner(s): Sony Sports; Volleyball World

Finals
- Champions: Ahmedabad Defenders (1st title)
- Runners-up: Bengaluru Torpedoes
- Finals MVP: Guru Prasanth (Hyderabad Black Hawks)

Prime Volleyball League seasons
- 2022 2024

2023 Prime Volleyball League (also known as PVL 2023 or RuPay PVL 2023) was the second season of the Prime Volleyball League, a franchise based Indian indoor volleyball league, organized by Baseline Ventures.

The Prime Volleyball League 2023 winner will qualify for the FIVB Volleyball Men’s Club World Championship 2023 to be held in India from December 6 to 10.

== Format ==
Eight teams are contesting in the second season. There are a total of 31 matches with each team plays against each other in a single round-robin format with the top 4 teams moving into the play-offs.

== Venue ==
Bengaluru’s Koramangala Indoor Stadium scheduled to host the first 10 matches till February 12. The venue for the next 10 matches scheduled to be held at GMC Balayogi Indoor Stadium in Hyderabad. The final leg of PVL 2023, including the semi-finals and final, scheduled to be held at Regional Sports Centre in Kochi.

== League standings ==
Win by 5-0 margin: 3 Points

Win by any other margin: 2 Points

Loss: 0 Points

If the teams are level on points, the number of sets won will be taken into consideration. The top four teams at the end of the league stage will move into the semifinals.

Pos	Team	Pld	W	L	Pts	SW	SL	SR	SPW	SPL	SPR	Qualification
1	Kolkata Thunderbolts	7	6	1	12	23	12	1.917	480	422	1.137	Qualified for play-offs
2	Ahmedabad Defenders	7	5	2	11	22	13	1.692	476	443	1.074	Qualified for play-offs
3	Calicut Heroes	7	4	3	8	20	15	1.333	459	466	0.985	Qualified for play-offs
4	Bengaluru Torpedoes	7	4	3	8	19	16	1.188	460	463	0.994	Qualified for play-offs
5	Hyderabad Black Hawks	7	4	3	8	15	20	0.750	448	461	0.972	
6	Mumbai Meteors	7	2	5	5	15	20	0.750	450	464	0.970	
7	Kochi Blue Spikers	7	2	5	4	16	19	0.842	451	458	0.985	
8	Chennai Blitz	7	1	6	2	10	25	0.400	427	474	0.901	

== League stage ==
Date	Time		Score		Set 1	Set 2	Set 3	Set 4	Set 5	Total	Report
4 Feb	19:00	Bengaluru Torpedoes	2–3	Kolkata Thunderbolts	11–15	11–15	14–15	15–10	15–14	66–69	1
5 Feb	19:00	Mumbai Meteors	1–4	Calicut Heroes	15–10	9–15	8–15	14–15	11–15	57–70	2
6 Feb	19:00	Ahmedabad Defenders	2–3	Hyderabad Black Hawks	15–13	9–15	14–15	11–15	15–10	64–68	3
7 Feb	19:00	Kochi Blue Spikers	2–3	Chennai Blitz	9–15	15–11	10–15	15–8	9–15	58–64	4
8 Feb	19:00	Kolkata Thunderbolts	4–1	Hyderabad Black Hawks	15–13	15–7	15–9	15–12	8–15	68–56	5
9 Feb	19:00	Ahmedabad Defenders	3–2	Bengaluru Torpedoes	14–15	15–10	14–15	15–10	15–10	73–60	6
10 Feb	19:00	Chennai Blitz	0–5	Mumbai Meteors	14–15	6–15	11–15	12–15	9–15	52–75	7
11 Feb	19:00	Calicut Heroes	4–1	Hyderabad Black Hawks	15–14	15–12	15–11	4–15	15–14	64–66	8
12 Feb	19:00	Mumbai Meteors	1–4	Bengaluru Torpedoes	10–15	15–12	13–15	9–15	9–15	56–72	9
12 Feb	21:30	Kolkata Thunderbolts	4–1	Kochi Blue Spikers	15–9	15–11	15–14	15–11	12–15	72–60	10
15 Feb	19:00	Hyderabad Black Hawks	3–2	Kochi Blue Spikers	15–13	10–15	15–13	15–6	13–15	68–62	11
16 Feb	19:00	Bengaluru Torpedoes	3–2	Chennai Blitz	15–11	8–15	15–10	15–13	10–15	63–64	12
16 Feb	21:30	Kolkata Thunderbolts	2–3	Calicut Heroes	14–15	15–7	11–15	15–13	13–15	68–65	13
17 Feb	19:00	Ahmedabad Defenders	4–1	Mumbai Meteors	14–15	15–12	15–14	15–13	15–14	74–68	14
17 Feb	21:30	Bengaluru Torpedoes	3–2	Kochi Blue Spikers	15–14	15–11	7–15	15–12	14–15	66–67	15
18 Feb	19:00	Hyderabad Black Hawks	3–2	Chennai Blitz	10–15	15–14	15–9	12–15	15–11	67–64	16
19 Feb	19:00	Ahmedabad Defenders	5–0	Chennai Blitz	15–11	15–13	15–10	15–9	15–12	75–55	17
20 Feb	19:00	Kolkata Thunderbolts	3–2	Mumbai Meteors	12–15	15–6	12–15	15–11	15–11	69–58	18
20 Feb	21:30	Ahmedabad Defenders	3–2	Calicut Heroes	15–13	13–15	15–13	13–15	15–11	71–67	19
21 Feb	19:00	Hyderabad Black Hawks	3–2	Bengaluru Torpedoes	15–13	14–15	9–15	15–10	15–12	68–65	20
24 Feb	19:00	Calicut Heroes	3–2	Chennai Blitz	13–15	15–8	15–14	15–13	8–15	66–65	21
25 Feb	19:00	Kochi Blue Spikers	3–2	Calicut Heroes	15–13	14–15	12–15	15–7	15–11	71–61	22
26 Feb	19:00	Kochi Blue Spikers	2–3	Ahmedabad Defenders	5–15	15–11	15–9	12–15	14–15	61–65	23
26 Feb	21:30	Hyderabad Black Hawks	1–4	Mumbai Meteors	15–14	9–15	12–15	11–15	8–15	55–74	24
27 Feb	19:00	Kolkata Thunderbolts	4–1	Chennai Blitz	15–12	15–9	15–14	15–13	10–15	70–63	25
28 Feb	19:00	Bengaluru Torpedoes	3–2	Calicut Heroes	15–11	15–11	13–15	10–15	15–14	68–66	26
01 Mar	19:00	Mumbai Meteors	1–4	Kochi Blue Spikers	14–15	11–15	12–15	15–12	10–15	62–72	27
02 Mar	19:00	Kolkata Thunderbolts	3–2	Ahmedabad Defenders	15–7	15–4	15–13	8–15	11–15	64–54	28

== Play-offs ==
=== Semifinals ===
Top four teams of League stage are qualified to two different semifinal pairs.

==== Semifinal 1 ====
Date	Time		Score		Set 1	Set 2	Set 3	Set 4	Set 5	Total	Report
3 March	19:00	Kolkata Thunderbolts	1–3	Bengaluru Torpedoes	10–15	15–10	13–15	10–15		48–55	29

==== Semifinal 2 ====
Date	Time		Score		Set 1	Set 2	Set 3	Set 4	Set 5	Total	Report
4 March	19:00	Ahmedabad Defenders	3–1	Calicut Heroes	17–15	9–15	17–15	15–11		58–56	30

=== Finals ===
Date	Time		Score		Set 1	Set 2	Set 3	Set 4	Set 5	Total	Report
05 March	19:00	Bengaluru Torpedoes	2–3	Ahmedabad Defenders	7–15	10–15	20–18	15–13	10–15	62–76	31

== Final standings ==
Rank	Team
1st place, gold medalist(s)	Ahmedabad Defenders
2nd place, silver medalist(s)	Bengaluru Torpedoes
3rd place, bronze medalist(s)	Calicut Heroes
3rd place, bronze medalist(s)	Kolkata Thunderbolts
5	Hyderabad Black Hawks
6	Mumbai Meteors
7	Kochi Blue Spikers
8	Chennai Blitz

2023 Champions

Maiden title

Team Roster
Andrew James, Angamuthu Ramaswamy (c), Harsh Chaudhary, Aswath Pandiyaraj, Muthusamy Appavu, T Srikanth, Danial Moatazedi, LM Manoj, Muhammad Iqbal TN, Parth Patel, Nandhagopal Subramaniam, Ragul T, S Santhosh, Shon John
Head coach
Dakshinamoorthy S

== Awards ==
Player	Team	Award
Angamuthu Ramaswamy	Ahmedabad Defenders	Player of the Final Match
Dakshinamoorthy S	Ahmedabad Defenders	Coach of the Season
Mohan Ukkrapandian	Calicut Heroes	Setter of the Season
R Ramanathan	Chennai Blitz	Libero of the Season
Guru Prasanth	Hyderabad Black Hawks	Spiker of the Season
Jose Antonio Sandoval	Calicut Heroes	Blocker of the Season
Ibin Jose	Bengaluru Torpedoes	Emerging Player of the Season
Guru Prasanth	Hyderabad Black Hawks	Most Valuable Player
