= Telugu Black Hawks =

Indian volleyball team

- Founded: 2018; 8 years ago as Black Hawks Hyderabad
- Owner: GlobalArena6 Sports LLP, Vijay Devarakonda
- Head coach: Zoran Kedacic
- Captain: Ranjit Singh
- League: Prime Volleyball League
- 2022 2023 2024: 3rd place 5th place 9th place

Uniforms
Home	Away

Telugu Black Hawks (formerly Black Hawks Hyderabad and Hyderabad Black Hawks) are a professional men's volleyball team from Hyderabad, Telangana that play in the Prime Volleyball League in India. The club is currently owned by GlobalArena6 Sports LLP alongside co-owner, Vijay Deverakonda. The team has competed in three seasons of the Prime Volleyball League, recording their best season in the 2022 edition, finishing as joint-third place winners alongside the Calicut Heroes. Apart from competing in India's most competitive volleyball franchise league, the ownership has constantly stated their commitment to developing volleyball at the grassroots level in India.

== Franchise History ==
=== Franchise Ownership ===
The franchise was initially founded and owned by Agile Entertainment Pvt Ltd but later GlobalArena6 Sports LLP took over the reins in 2021 alongside Vijay Deverakonda.

A majority of the shares are currently held by the Kankanala Sports Group alongside co-owners Shyam Sundar Reddy and Deepak G. Reddy who are minority partners in the Hyderabad franchise.

The Kankanala Sports Group also owns INDE Racing, Telugu Talons, Bengaluru Raptors and Whizzy, a delivery logistics company.

=== Franchise Name ===
The franchise was initially named Black Hawks Hyderabad in 2018 and was owned by Agile Entertainment Pvt Ltd. The name was later changed to Hyderabad Black Hawks following a change of ownership that took place in 2021. The team has retained the name since then. Ahead of 2026 season the team rebranded to Telugu Black Hawks

=== Franchise Participation ===
Prior to the change in ownership the Black Hawks Hyderabad participated in the only season of the dissolved Pro Volleyball League in 2019. Ever since the change in ownership, the Hyderabad Black Hawks have participated in three seasons of the Prime Volleyball League, first featuring in 2022 recording their best-ever finish during that season.

=== Franchise Anthem ===
The Hyderabad Black Hawks' team anthem was officially given the title "Hawk Attack", composed by Karthik Kodakandla and was sung by Rahul Sipligunj and Mangli. The lyrics were written by Giridhar and drums and percussion were provided by Sivamani. The anthem gained popularity upon its release and has been continued to be used by the Hyderabad Black Hawks since its release.

== Season History ==
=== Prime Volleyball League, 2022 ===
The inaugural edition of the Prime Volleyball League saw the participation of seven teams and was held at the Gachibowli Stadium in Hyderabad. The Hyderabad Black Hawks got off to a flying start, winning their first league game, 4-1, against the Kochi Blue Spikers. They then went on to win two more games over the course of the season, powering them to a spot in the semi-final.

The Hyderabad Black Hawks and the Calicut Heroes finished with 7 points each in the group stage, with the latter claiming third place as a result of a higher set difference. The Hyderabad based franchise went down against the Ahmedabad Defenders in the semi-final and were declared joint-third place winners alongside the Calicut Heroes.

Guru Prasanth recorded 69 points during the season, and won the Emerging Player of the Year Award. John Joseph was awarded the Blocker of the Season Award; he recorded 17 blocks at a success rate of 40%.

Match Results
Date		Score		Set 1	Set 2	Set 3	Set 4	Set 5	Total Points
League Stage
5 Feb	Hyderabad Black Hawks	4–1	Kochi Blue Spikers	15–12	15–11	15–11	15–10	13–15	73–59
10 Feb	Ahmedabad Defenders	4–1	Hyderabad Black Hawks	15–13	15–10	15–12	15–8	9–15	69–58
11 Feb	Bengaluru Torpedoes	3–2	Hyderabad Black Hawks	15–12	14–15	15–12	11–15	15–13	70–67
13 Feb	Hyderabad Black Hawks	5–0	Chennai Blitz	15–14	15–11	15–14	15–7	15–13	75–59
15 Feb	Kolkata Thunderbolts	2–3	Hyderabad Black Hawks	8–15	15–13	9–15	12–15	15–8	59–66
21 Feb	Calicut Heroes	5–0	Hyderabad Black Hawks	15–14	15–10	15–14	15–14	15–9	75–61
Semi-Final
24 Feb	Ahmedabad Defenders	3–1	Hyderabad Black Hawks	15–13	15–12	9–15	15–12	-	54–52

Final Standings (PVL 2022)
Position	Team Name	League stage finish
Champions	Kolkata Thunderbolts	2nd
Runners-up	Ahmedabad Defenders	1st
3rd	Calicut Heroes	3rd
3rd	Hyderabad Black Hawks	4th
4th	Bengaluru Torpedoes	5th
5th	Chennai Blitz	6th
6th	Kochi Blue Spikers	7th

=== Prime Volleyball League, 2023 ===
Prior to the start of the second season of the Prime Volleyball League, the Hyderabad Black Hawks hosted an event that came to be known as Hype Night. The event was organized with the intention of bringing fans up close and personal with the players of the Hyderabad Black Hawks. As part of Hype Night's festivities, two teams consisting of players from the Hyderabad Black Hawks played out a volleyball match in total darkness illuminated by UV and neon lighting in front of a packed crowd. The on-court volleyball action was accompanied by music and entertainment, and also featured Telugu actor Vijay Devarakonda.

The second edition of the Prime Volleyball League saw the participation of eight teams and was played across three Indian cities, namely Bengaluru, Hyderabad and Kochi. The Hyderabad Black Hawks got off to a strong start before facing two consecutive defeats. They then managed to turn their form around but were unfortunate not to make the semi-final, as they missed out by the narrowest of margins, failing to secure qualification as a result of a poor set difference of -5.

Guru Prasanth wore the captain's armband for the 2023 season, becoming the first player to score more than 100 points in a single season. He finished the season with a total of 114 points, picking up the MVP awardin the process. The Ahmedabad Defenders went on to become the champions.

Match Results
Date		Score		Set 1	Set 2	Set 3	Set 4	Set 5	Total
League Stage
6 Feb	Ahmedabad Defenders	2–3	Hyderabad Black Hawks	15–13	9–15	14–15	11–15	15–10	64–68
8 Feb	Kolkata Thunderbolts	4–1	Hyderabad Black Hawks	15–13	15–7	15–9	15–12	8–15	68–56
11 Feb	Calicut Heroes	4–1	Hyderabad Black Hawks	15–14	15–12	15–11	4–15	15–14	64–66
15 Feb	Hyderabad Black Hawks	3–2	Kochi Blue Spikers	15–13	10–15	15–13	15–6	13–15	68–62
18 Feb	Hyderabad Black Hawks	3–2	Chennai Blitz	10–15	15–14	15–9	12–15	15–11	67–64
21 Feb	Hyderabad Black Hawks	3–2	Bengaluru Torpedoes	15–13	14–15	9–15	15–10	15–12	68–65
26 Feb	Hyderabad Black Hawks	1–4	Mumbai Meteors	15–14	9–15	12–15	11–15	8–15	55–74

Final Standings (PVL 2023)
Position	Team Name	League Stage Finish
Champions	Ahmedabad Defenders	2nd
Runners-up	Bengaluru Torpedoes	4th
3rd	Calicut Heroes	3rd
4th	Kolkata Thunderbolts	1st
5th	Hyderabad Black Hawks	5th
6th	Mumbai Meteors	6th
7th	Kochi Blue Spikers	7th
8th	Chennai Blitz	8th

=== Prime Volleyball League, 2024 ===
Before the start of season three of the Prime Volleyball League, the Hyderabad Black Hawks hosted the VD Black Hawks Open'24, which was a grassroots level volleyball tournament. The tournament was powered by RuPay, with Red Bull serving as the official energy partner. The VD Black Hawks Open'24 was primarily held in Jawaharlal Nehru Technological University, Hyderabad. The tournament was aimed at developing volleyball at the grassroots level in the Telugu speaking states of India, and provided for the tournament winners to get a chance to train with the players of the Hyderabad Black Hawks.

The inaugural season of the VD Black Hawks Open '24 saw the participation of over 3000 players and 300+ teams, and was held across 16 different locations. The final of the tournament was held in Gachibowli Stadium and was played between Ranga Reddy and Nellore. Ranga Reddy was crowned as the winner of the VD Black Hawks Open '24. As part of the VD Black Hawks Open '24, players of the Hyderabad Black Hawks played out an exhibition match among themselves. Vijay Devarakonda presented the tournament winners with the award and also revealed the jersey for the season.

The most recent edition of the Prime Volleyball League saw the participation of nine teams and was held in the Jawaharlal Nehru Indoor Stadium in Chennai. The Hyderabad Black Hawks finished last in the league stage recording just one win against the Mumbai Meteors. The Calicut Heroes won their maiden Prime Volleyball League title.

Match Results
Date		Score		Set 1	Set 2	Set 3	Set 4	Set 5	Total
League Stage
17 Feb	Chennai Blitz	3–0	Hyderabad Black Hawks	16–14	15–11	15–7	-	-	46–32
19 Feb	Mumbai Meteors	2–3	Hyderabad Black Hawks	15–7	15–12	10–15	11–15	18-20	69–49
22 Feb	Ahmedabad Defenders	3–0	Hyderabad Black Hawks	17–15	15–13	15–11	-	-	47–39
26 Feb	Delhi Toofans	3-1	Hyderabad Black Hawks	15–11	13–15	15–9	15–11	-	58–46
29 Feb	Kolkata Thunderbolts	3-1	Hyderabad Black Hawks	15–8	15–8	11–15	20–18	-	61–49
02 Mar	Hyderabad Black Hawks	0-3	Calicut Heroes	13–15	16–18	14–16	-	-	43–49
04 Mar	Hyderabad Black Hawks	0-3	Bengaluru Torpedoes	6–15	11–15	12–15	-	-	29–45
09 Mar	Hyderabad Black Hawks	0-3	Kochi Blue Spikers	12–15	12–15	11–15	-	-	35–45

Final Standings (PVL 2024)
Position	Team Name	League Stage Finish
Champions	Calicut Heroes	1st
Runners-up	Delhi Toofans	2nd
3rd	Ahmedabad Defenders	3rd
4th	Bengaluru Torpedoes	4th
5th	Mumbai Meteors	5th
6th	Chennai Blitz	6th
7th	Kolkata Thunderbolts	7th
8th	Kochi Blue Spikers	8th
9th	Hyderabad Black Hawks	9th

== Overall Season Summary ==
Team	Competition	Year	Finish	Matches Won	Matches Lost
Hyderabad Black Hawks	Prime Volleyball League	2022	3rd	3	3
Hyderabad Black Hawks	Prime Volleyball League	2023	5th	4	3
Hyderabad Black Hawks	Prime Volleyball League	2024	9th	1	7

== Honors ==
=== Prime Volleyball League, 2022 ===
- Emerging player of the year - Guru Prasanth
- Blocker of the Season - John Joseph

=== Prime Volleyball League, 2023 ===
- Most valuable player (MVP) - Guru Prasanth

== Current roster ==
Team roster 2024
No.	Name	Position	Jersey no.
1	(India) Sahil Kumar	Universal	7
2	(India) Lal Sujan MV (VC)	Setter	13
3	(India) Ranjit Singh (C)	Setter	4
4	(India) Deepu Venugopal	Libero	1
5	(India) Naveen Jagadesan	Libero	18
6	(India) Abhilash Chaudhary	Blocker	14
7	(India) John Joseph	Blocker	17
8	(India) Prince	Blocker	10
9	(Serbia) Stefan Kovačević	Blocker	3
10	(India) Ashamatullah	Attacker	5
11	(India) Ashok	Attacker	11
12	(India) Hemanth P	Attacker	2
13	(Venezuela) Iván Fernández	Attacker	8
14	(India) Niyas Abdul Salam	Attacker	9

== Administration and Support Staff ==
Position	Name
Owner	GlobalArena6 Sports LLP
Head coach	(India) Rajesh Kumar
Assistant Coach	(India) Rahul Sangwan
Physio	(India) Dr. Ravi
Strength and Conditioning Coach	(India) Mani
Team Managers	(India) Sanjay Saji, (India) Rathan Kumar
