= Prime Volleyball League =

Indian volleyball league

- Current season, competition or edition: 2026 Prime Volleyball League
- Sport: Volleyball
- Founded: 2021; 5 years ago
- First season: 2022
- CEO: Joy Bhattacharjya
- Administrator: Baseline Ventures
- No. of teams: 10
- Country: India
- Confederation: AVC
- Most recent champion: Bengaluru Torpedoes (1st title) (2025)
- Most titles: Kolkata Thunderbolts; Ahmedabad Defenders; Calicut Heroes; Bengaluru Torpedoes (1 title each)
- Broadcaster: Sony Sports
- Streaming partner: YouTube
- International cup: CAVA Men's Club Championship
- Website: primevolleyballleague.com

Prime Volleyball League is a professional men's indoor volleyball league in India. The inaugural season took place in February 2022. The league is an initiative of Baseline Ventures with no involvement from Volleyball Federation of India and a rechristened version of the Pro Volleyball League which was held in February 2019. Sony Pictures Networks India is the official broadcaster of the league. Bengaluru Torpedoes are the defending champions having defeated the Mumbai Meteors in the 2025 PVL final.

== Background ==
The Volleyball Federation of India (VFI) in association with the Baseline Ventures launched and conducted the inaugural season of a franchise-based indoor volleyball league called Pro Volleyball League in 2019 and Chennai Spartans won the title. Later it was discontinued in the same year after the VFI and Baseline got embroiled in a dispute and the federation terminated the 10-year contract with Baseline alleging breach of trust. In November 2020, a Madras High Court-appointed arbitrator found the termination wrongful and awarded ₹4.5 crore to Baseline as compensation for terminating its contract. In June 2021, Baseline Ventures joined hands with few original franchise owners from Pro Volleyball League to launch a new league called Prime Volleyball League with no involvement from VFI this time. Five of the six teams (Ahmedabad Defenders, Calicut Heroes, Chennai Spartans, Hyderabad Black Hawks and Kochi Blue Spikers) from Pro Volleyball League returned to this league with two new teams (Bengaluru Torpedoes and Kolkata Thunderbolts) were added for the inaugural edition.

On 14 February 2022, VFI announced the launch of Indian Volleyball League, making it the only recognised league by VFI in India.

Volleyball World has signed multiple-year contract with Prime Volleyball League. Prime Volleyball League will broadcast globally through its platform.

In October 2022, the league announced an eighth team called the Mumbai Meteors that is based in Mumbai which played from the 2023 Prime Volleyball League season. They were bought by the PhonePe owners.

In December 2023, the league announced a ninth team called the Delhi Toofans that is based in Delhi which played from the 2024 Prime Volleyball League season. They were bought by the Sanghi Group.

In June 2024, the league announced a tenth team called Goa Guardians that is based in Panaji, Goa which played from the 2025 Prime Volleyball League season. They were bought by the Chekuri Sports Ventures.

== Teams ==
Locations of the Prime Volleyball League teams

The Prime Volleyball League encompassed ten franchises, representing cities across India.

Team name	City	Captain	Head coach	International players	Team owner	Debut	Ref.
Ahmedabad Defenders	Ahmedabad, Gujarat	(India) Muthusamy Appavu	(India) Sajjad Hussain (India) S Dakshinamoorthy	(United States) Ryan Meehan (Argentina) Rodrigo Villalboa	Bonhomie Sports	2022	
Bengaluru Torpedoes	Bengaluru, Karnataka	(India) Ranjit Singh	(India) K R Lakshminarayana	(United States) Kyle Friend (United States) Noah Taitano	Limitless Human Performance	2022	
Calicut Heroes	Kozhikode, Kerala	(India) Jerome Vinith	(India) Kishor Kumar	(United States) David Lee (France) Aaron Koubi	Beacon Sports	2022	
Chennai Blitz	Chennai, Tamil Nadu	(India) Mohan Ukkrapandian	(India) Chander Singh	(Brazil) Bruno Da Silva Amorim (Venezuela) Fernando David Gonzalez	SPP Group	2022	
Delhi Toofans	New Delhi, Delhi	(India) Saqlain Tariq	(India) Manoj Nair	(Puerto Rico) Carlos Berrios (Venezuela) Jesus Chourio	Sanghi Group	2024	
Goa Guardians	Panaji, Goa	(India) Chirag Yadav	(India) Jothish	(United States) Jeffrey Menzel (United States) Nathaniel Dickinson	Chekuri Sports Ventures	2025	
Telugu Black Hawks	Hyderabad, Telangana	(India) Vipul Kumar	(Argentina) Ruben Wolochin	(Cuba) Henry Bell Cisnero (Venezuela) Luis Antonio Arias	GlobalArena6 Sports	2022	
Kochi Blue Spikers	Kochi, Kerala	(India) Karthik	(India) Dr. M. H. Kumara	(United States) Colton Cowell (United States) Cody Caldwell	M Liga Sports	2022	
Mumbai Meteors	Mumbai, Maharashtra	(India) Amit Gulia	(India) Abhijit Bhattacharya	(Cuba) Hiroshi Centelles (United States) Brandon Greenway	Meteor Sports	2023	
Kolkata Thunderbolts	Kolkata, West Bengal	(India) Ashwal Rai	(India) Sunny Joseph	(United States) Matthew August (United States) Ian Woo Satterfield	Kolkata Sports Ventures	2022	

== Format ==
Each team will have 12 players with the provision of a maximum of two reserve players. All teams have a salary purse of ₹75 lakhs from which they can pick their team via an auction and player draft. Each team can pick maximum of two International players for ₹25 to ₹30 lakhs while the Indian players are chosen via an auction from the remaining money. The auction was taken place in Kochi on 14 December 2021. Players were divided into five categories with different base prices set for each category – International, Platinum, Gold, Silver, Bronze and U-21 players.

There are a total of 24 matches with each team playing against each other in a single round-robin format with the top 4 teams moving into the Play-Offs. The first edition was earlier scheduled to be held in Kochi but later moved to Gachibowli Indoor Stadium, Hyderabad due to the COVID-19 pandemic in India.

== Editions and results ==
Season	Final			Final venue	No. of teams	Ref.
Season	Winner	Score	Runner-up	Final venue	No. of teams	Ref.
2022 Details	Kolkata Thunderbolts	3–0	Ahmedabad Defenders	Gachibowli Indoor Stadium, Hyderabad	7	
2023 Details	Ahmedabad Defenders	3–2	Bengaluru Torpedoes	Rajiv Gandhi Stadium, Kochi	8	
2024 Details	Calicut Heroes	3–1	Delhi Toofans	Jawaharlal Nehru Indoor Stadium, Chennai	9	
2025 Details	Bengaluru Torpedoes	3–0	Mumbai Meteors	Gachibowli Indoor Stadium in Hyderabad	10	

== Performance by teams ==
Team	Winners	Runners-up	Playoffs	Years won	Years runner-up	Years Playoffs	No. of seasons played
Ahmedabad Defenders	1	1	4	2023	2022	2022, 2023, 2024, 2025	4
Kolkata Thunderbolts	1	0	2	2022	—	2022, 2023	4
Calicut Heroes	1	0	3	2024	—	2022, 2023, 2024	4
Bengaluru Torpedoes	1	1	3	2025	2023	2023, 2024, 2025	4
Chennai Blitz	0	0	0	—	—	—	4
Telugu Black Hawks	0	0	1	—	—	2022	4
Kochi Blue Spikers	0	0	0	—	—	—	4
Mumbai Meteors	0	1	1	—	2025	2025	3
Delhi Toofans	0	1	1	—	2024	2024	2
Goa Guardians	0	0	1	—	—	2025	1

== Viewership ==
TV viewership increased by a staggering 55%, with a colossal 206 million people tuning in to watch the matches throughout the second season.The PVL also drew equal interest from female audiences with the gender ratio between male and female TV viewers being 58:42.

== See also ==
- Sports in India
- Indian Volley League
- Pro Volleyball League
