= 2014 FIVB Volleyball World League =

International sport competition

2014 World League
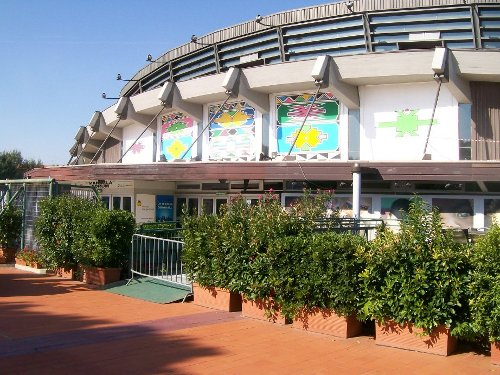
- The Nelson Mandela Forum hosted the final

Tournament details
- Host country: Italy
- City: Florence (Group 1 Final)
- Dates: 23 May – 20 July
- Teams: 28 (from 5 confederations)
- Venues: 66 (in 66 host cities)

Final positions
- Champions: United States (2nd title)
- Runners-up: Brazil
- Third place: Italy
- Fourth place: Iran

Tournament awards
- MVP: (United States) Taylor Sander
- Best Setter: (Iran) Saeid Marouf
- Best OH: (Brazil) Ricardo Lucarelli (United States) Taylor Sander
- Best MB: (United States) David Lee (Brazil) Lucas Saatkamp
- Best OPP: (Brazil) Wallace de Souza
- Best Libero: (Italy) Salvatore Rossini

The 2014 FIVB Volleyball World League was the 25th edition of the annual men's international volleyball tournament, played by 28 countries from 23 May to 20 July 2014. The Group 1 Final Round was held in Florence, Italy.

== Qualification ==
- No qualification tournament.
- All teams of the 2013 edition directly qualified.
- 10 teams were invited by the FIVB.

| Africa | Asia and Oceania | Europe | North America | South America |
|---|---|---|---|---|
| Tunisia | Australia; China; Iran; Japan; South Korea | Belgium; Bulgaria; Czech Republic; Finland; France Germany; Italy; Netherlands; Poland; Portugal Russia; Serbia; Slovakia; Spain; Turkey | Canada; Cuba; Mexico; Puerto Rico; United States | Argentina; Brazil |

== Format ==
- It will be the first time the World League will feature 28 teams, having had 18 teams in 2013 and 16 teams from 2001 to 2003 and 2006–12. The World League featured 8 teams in its inaugural year in 1990, 10 in 1991 and then 12 from 1992 to 2000 and 2004–05.
- During the Intercontinental Round, Pools A to E will play double home and away matches, for a total of 12 matches per team. Pool F & G will feature two stand-alone tournaments per pool involving the four teams in the pool.
- The last ranked team of Group 1 after the Intercontinental Round could be relegated if the winners of the Group 2 Final Round can meet the promotion requirements set by the FIVB.

== Pools composition ==
The pools were announced on 1 December 2013.

| Group 1 | | Group 2 | | | Group 3 | |
| Pool A | Pool B | Pool C | Pool D | Pool E | Pool F | Pool G |
|---|---|---|---|---|---|---|
| Brazil | Russia | Belgium | Argentina | Netherlands | Tunisia | Puerto Rico |
| Italy | United States | Canada | Germany | South Korea | Turkey | China |
| Poland | Bulgaria | Australia | France | Portugal | Cuba | Slovakia |
| Iran | Serbia | Finland | Japan | Czech Republic | Mexico | Spain |

== Pool standing procedure ==
1. Match points
2. Number of matches won
3. Sets ratio
4. Points ratio
5. Result of the last match between the tied teams

Match won 3–0 or 3–1: 3 match points for the winner, 0 match points for the loser
Match won 3–2: 2 match points for the winner, 1 match point for the loser

== Intercontinental round ==
- All times are local.

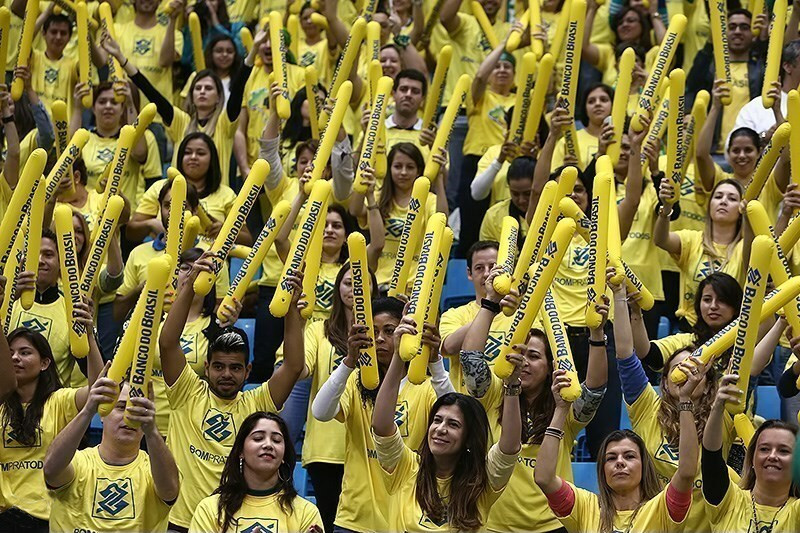
Brazilian fans at match against Iran

=== Group 1 ===
- The Group 1 Final Round hosts Italy, the top two teams from Pool A and B and the winners of the Group 2 Final Round will qualify for the Group 1 Final Round. If Italy finishes as one of the top two teams in Pool A, Pool A will send its top three teams.

==== Pool A ====
| Pos | Team | Pld | W | L | Pts | SW | SL | SR | SPW | SPL | SPR | Qualification |
|---|---|---|---|---|---|---|---|---|---|---|---|---|
| 1 | Italy (Note: Qualified as hosts) (H) | 12 | 6 | 6 | 19 | 24 | 22 | 1.091 | 1031 | 1051 | 0.981 | Group 1 Final round |
| 2 | Iran | 12 | 6 | 6 | 19 | 23 | 22 | 1.045 | 1018 | 986 | 1.032 | Group 1 Final round |
| 3 | Brazil | 12 | 6 | 6 | 17 | 23 | 24 | 0.958 | 1075 | 1057 | 1.017 | Group 1 Final round |
| 4 | Poland | 12 | 6 | 6 | 17 | 21 | 23 | 0.913 | 994 | 1024 | 0.971 | |

(H) Host

===== Week 1 =====
- Venue: Arena Jaraguá, Jaraguá do Sul, Brazil

| Date | Time | | Score | | Set 1 | Set 2 | Set 3 | Set 4 | Set 5 | Total | Report |
|---|---|---|---|---|---|---|---|---|---|---|---|
| 23 May | 14:45 | Brazil | 1–3 | Italy | 19–25 | 25–27 | 25–22 | 21–25 | | 90–99 | P2 P3 |
| 24 May | 10:10 | Brazil | 1–3 | Italy | 17–25 | 26–24 | 23–25 | 20–25 | | 86–99 | P2 P3 |

===== Week 2 =====
- Venue: Ginásio Chico Neto, Maringá, Brazil
- Venue: PalaTrieste, Trieste, Italy
- Venue: PalaOlimpia, Verona, Italy

| Date | Time | | Score | | Set 1 | Set 2 | Set 3 | Set 4 | Set 5 | Total | Report |
|---|---|---|---|---|---|---|---|---|---|---|---|
| 29 May | 14:45 | Brazil | 3–0 | Poland | 25–23 | 29–27 | 25–19 | | | 79–69 | P2 P3 |
| 30 May | 14:45 | Brazil | 0–3 | Poland | 24–26 | 26–28 | 21–25 | | | 71–79 | P2 P3 |
| 30 May | 20:30 | Italy | 3–0 | Iran | 25–19 | 25–22 | 25–23 | | | 75–64 | P2 P3 |
| 1 Jun | 20:00 | Italy | 3–0 | Iran | 27–25 | 25–18 | 25–22 | | | 77–65 | P2 P3 |

===== Week 3 =====
- Venue: Ginásio do Ibirapuera, São Paulo, Brazil
- Venue: PalaFlorio, Bari, Italy
- Venue: Foro Italico Tennis Center Court, Rome, Italy

| Date | Time | | Score | | Set 1 | Set 2 | Set 3 | Set 4 | Set 5 | Total | Report |
|---|---|---|---|---|---|---|---|---|---|---|---|
| 6 Jun | 10:00 | Brazil | 3–2 | Iran | 25–23 | 28–30 | 26–28 | 25–23 | 15–13 | 119–117 | P2 P3 |
| 6 Jun | 20:30 | Italy | 3–1 | Poland | 25–22 | 20–25 | 25–23 | 25–20 | | 95–90 | P2 P3 |
| 7 Jun | 10:00 | Brazil | 0–3 | Iran | 18–25 | 21–25 | 22–25 | | | 61–75 | P2 P3 |
| 8 Jun | 20:00 | Italy | 3–1 | Poland | 25–21 | 25–20 | 15–25 | 25–17 | | 90–83 | P2 P3 |

===== Week 4 =====
- Venue: Azadi Indoor Stadium, Tehran, Iran
- Venue: Spodek, Katowice, Poland
- Venue: Atlas Arena, Łódź, Poland

| Date | Time | | Score | | Set 1 | Set 2 | Set 3 | Set 4 | Set 5 | Total | Report |
|---|---|---|---|---|---|---|---|---|---|---|---|
| 13 Jun | 21:00 | Iran | 3–2 | Brazil | 18–25 | 27–25 | 20–25 | 25–17 | 15–9 | 105–101 | P2 P3 |
| 13 Jun | 19:30 | Poland | 3–2 | Italy | 25–23 | 24–26 | 26–24 | 25–27 | 15–10 | 115–110 | P2 P3 |
| 15 Jun | 21:00 | Iran | 2–3 | Brazil | 19–25 | 16–25 | 25–23 | 25–23 | 10–15 | 95–111 | P2 P3 |
| 15 Jun | 19:30 | Poland | 3–1 | Italy | 25–22 | 25–23 | 23–25 | 25–15 | | 98–85 | P2 P3 |

===== Week 5 =====
- Venue: Azadi Indoor Stadium, Tehran, Iran
- Venue: Kraków Arena, Kraków, Poland
- Venue: Łuczniczka, Bydgoszcz, Poland

| Date | Time | | Score | | Set 1 | Set 2 | Set 3 | Set 4 | Set 5 | Total | Report |
|---|---|---|---|---|---|---|---|---|---|---|---|
| 20 Jun | 18:30 | Iran | 3–0 | Italy | 25–18 | 25–20 | 25–15 | | | 75–53 | P2 P3 |
| 20 Jun | 19:30 | Poland | 3–1 | Brazil | 25–20 | 25–21 | 28–30 | 25–20 | | 103–91 | P2 P3 |
| 22 Jun | 18:30 | Iran | 3–1 | Italy | 25–22 | 25–19 | 19–25 | 25–20 | | 94–86 | P2 P3 |
| 22 Jun | 19:30 | Poland | 0–3 | Brazil | 21–25 | 16–25 | 17–25 | | | 54–75 | P2 P3 |

===== Week 6 =====
- Venue: Azadi Indoor Stadium, Tehran, Iran

| Date | Time | | Score | | Set 1 | Set 2 | Set 3 | Set 4 | Set 5 | Total | Report |
|---|---|---|---|---|---|---|---|---|---|---|---|
| 27 Jun | 21:00 | Iran | 3–1 | Poland | 23–25 | 25–16 | 25–11 | 25–19 | | 98–71 | P2 P3 |
| 29 Jun | 21:00 | Iran | 3–0 | Poland | 25–22 | 25–20 | 25–22 | | | 75–64 | P2 P3 |

===== Week 7 =====
- Venue: Unipol Arena, Casalecchio di Reno, Italy
- Venue: Ergo Arena, Gdańsk, Poland
- Venue: Mediolanum Forum, Assago, Italy

| Date | Time | | Score | | Set 1 | Set 2 | Set 3 | Set 4 | Set 5 | Total | Report |
|---|---|---|---|---|---|---|---|---|---|---|---|
| 3 Jul | 20:00 | Italy | 1–3 | Brazil | 16–25 | 25–21 | 19–25 | 19–25 | | 79–96 | P2 P3 |
| 4 Jul | 20:15 | Poland | 3–1 | Iran | 17–25 | 26–24 | 25–23 | 25–23 | | 93–95 | P2 P3 |
| 5 Jul | 20:15 | Poland | 3–0 | Iran | 25–23 | 25–20 | 25–17 | | | 75–60 | P2 P3 |
| 6 Jul | 17:00 | Italy | 1–3 | Brazil | 25–27 | 25–18 | 17–25 | 16–25 | | 83–95 | P2 P3 |

==== Pool B ====
| Pos | Team | Pld | W | L | Pts | SW | SL | SR | SPW | SPL | SPR | Qualification |
|---|---|---|---|---|---|---|---|---|---|---|---|---|
| 1 | United States | 12 | 9 | 3 | 24 | 29 | 20 | 1.450 | 1114 | 1045 | 1.066 | Group 1 Final round |
| 2 | Russia | 12 | 7 | 5 | 24 | 28 | 16 | 1.750 | 1013 | 950 | 1.066 | Group 1 Final round |
| 3 | Serbia | 12 | 7 | 5 | 20 | 24 | 20 | 1.200 | 997 | 965 | 1.033 | |
| 4 | Bulgaria | 12 | 1 | 11 | 4 | 10 | 35 | 0.286 | 895 | 1059 | 0.845 | Relegated position |

===== Week 1 =====
- Venue: Palace of Culture and Sports, Varna, Bulgaria

| Date | Time | | Score | | Set 1 | Set 2 | Set 3 | Set 4 | Set 5 | Total | Report |
|---|---|---|---|---|---|---|---|---|---|---|---|
| 23 May | 20:30 | Bulgaria | 2–3 | United States | 25–19 | 25–22 | 25–27 | 19–25 | 12–15 | 106–108 | P2 P3 |
| 24 May | 20:00 | Bulgaria | 1–3 | United States | 25–19 | 22–25 | 25–27 | 17–25 | | 89–96 | P2 P3 |

===== Week 2 =====
- Venue: Čair Sports Center, Niš, Serbia

| Date | Time | | Score | | Set 1 | Set 2 | Set 3 | Set 4 | Set 5 | Total | Report |
|---|---|---|---|---|---|---|---|---|---|---|---|
| 30 May | 20:00 | Serbia | 3–2 | Russia | 25–20 | 25–17 | 22–25 | 19–25 | 15–13 | 106–100 | P2 P3 |
| 31 May | 20:00 | Serbia | 3–1 | Russia | 21–25 | 25–16 | 25–18 | 25–20 | | 96–79 | P2 P3 |

===== Week 3 =====
- Venue: Walter Pyramid, Long Beach, United States
- Venue: Arena Armeec, Sofia, Bulgaria

| Date | Time | | Score | | Set 1 | Set 2 | Set 3 | Set 4 | Set 5 | Total | Report |
|---|---|---|---|---|---|---|---|---|---|---|---|
| 6 Jun | 19:07 | United States | 3–2 | Russia | 25–17 | 27–25 | 20–25 | 25–27 | 15–12 | 112–106 | P2 P3 |
| 7 Jun | 20:10 | Bulgaria | 0–3 | Serbia | 26–28 | 18–25 | 13–25 | | | 57–78 | P2 P3 |
| 7 Jun | 19:10 | United States | 3–0 | Russia | 25–19 | 25–23 | 25–17 | | | 75–59 | P2 P3 |
| 8 Jun | 20:10 | Bulgaria | 2–3 | Serbia | 18–25 | 21–25 | 25–20 | 25–22 | 11–15 | 100–107 | P2 P3 |

===== Week 4 =====
- Venue: UIC Pavilion, Chicago, United States
- Venue: Energetik Sports Complex, Surgut, Russia

| Date | Time | | Score | | Set 1 | Set 2 | Set 3 | Set 4 | Set 5 | Total | Report |
|---|---|---|---|---|---|---|---|---|---|---|---|
| 13 Jun | 19:00 | United States | 3–0 | Serbia | 30–28 | 25–20 | 25–16 | | | 80–64 | P2 P3 |
| 14 Jun | 18:00 | Russia | 3–0 | Bulgaria | 25–18 | 25–22 | 25–15 | | | 75–55 | P2 P3 |
| 14 Jun | 19:00 | United States | 3–2 | Serbia | 25–22 | 25–12 | 26–28 | 23–25 | 15–13 | 114–100 | P2 P3 |
| 15 Jun | 18:00 | Russia | 3–0 | Bulgaria | 25–20 | 25–21 | 25–23 | | | 75–64 | P2 P3 |

===== Week 5 =====
- Venue: Energetik Sports Complex, Surgut, Russia
- Venue: Sears Centre, Hoffman Estates, United States

| Date | Time | | Score | | Set 1 | Set 2 | Set 3 | Set 4 | Set 5 | Total | Report |
|---|---|---|---|---|---|---|---|---|---|---|---|
| 20 Jun | 18:00 | Russia | 3–0 | Serbia | 37–35 | 25–15 | 25–16 | | | 87–66 | P2 P3 |
| 20 Jun | 19:00 | United States | 3–1 | Bulgaria | 20–25 | 25–22 | 25–16 | 25–16 | | 95–79 | P2 P3 |
| 21 Jun | 18:00 | Russia | 3–0 | Serbia | 25–19 | 27–25 | 25–20 | | | 77–64 | P2 P3 |
| 21 Jun | 19:00 | United States | 2–3 | Bulgaria | 24–26 | 17–25 | 25–14 | 25–13 | 12–15 | 103–93 | P2 P3 |

===== Week 6 =====
- Venue: Yantarny Sports Complex, Kaliningrad, Russia
- Venue: SPC Vojvodina, Novi Sad, Serbia
- Venue: Čair Sports Center, Niš, Serbia

| Date | Time | | Score | | Set 1 | Set 2 | Set 3 | Set 4 | Set 5 | Total | Report |
|---|---|---|---|---|---|---|---|---|---|---|---|
| 27 Jun | 18:00 | Russia | 2–3 | United States | 18–25 | 19–25 | 27–25 | 25–19 | 19–21 | 108–115 | P2 P3 |
| 27 Jun | 20:00 | Serbia | 3–0 | Bulgaria | 25–21 | 25–18 | 25–19 | | | 75–58 | P2 P3 |
| 28 Jun | 18:00 | Russia | 3–0 | United States | 25–21 | 25–19 | 25–21 | | | 75–61 | P2 P3 |
| 29 Jun | 20:00 | Serbia | 3–0 | Bulgaria | 25–23 | 25–21 | 25–14 | | | 75–58 | P2 P3 |

===== Week 7 =====
- Venue: SPC Vojvodina, Novi Sad, Serbia
- Venue: Arena Armeec, Sofia, Bulgaria
- Venue: Pionir Hall, Belgrade, Serbia

| Date | Time | | Score | | Set 1 | Set 2 | Set 3 | Set 4 | Set 5 | Total | Report |
|---|---|---|---|---|---|---|---|---|---|---|---|
| 4 Jul | 20:00 | Serbia | 3–0 | United States | 25–21 | 25–20 | 25–17 | | | 75–58 | P2 P3 |
| 5 Jul | 20:00 | Bulgaria | 1–3 | Russia | 22–25 | 23–25 | 25–22 | 20–25 | | 90–97 | P2 P3 |
| 6 Jul | 20:00 | Bulgaria | 0–3 | Russia | 14–25 | 17–25 | 15–25 | | | 46–75 | P2 P3 |
| 6 Jul | 20:00 | Serbia | 1–3 | United States | 21–25 | 25–20 | 25–27 | 20–25 | | 91–97 | P2 P3 |

=== Group 2 ===
- The Group 2 Final Round hosts Australia and the winners of Pool C, D and E will qualify for the Group 2 Final Round. If Australia finishes first in Pool C, Pool C will send its top two teams.

==== Pool C ====
| Pos | Team | Pld | W | L | Pts | SW | SL | SR | SPW | SPL | SPR | Qualification |
|---|---|---|---|---|---|---|---|---|---|---|---|---|
| 1 | Belgium | 12 | 7 | 5 | 25 | 29 | 20 | 1.450 | 1119 | 1066 | 1.050 | Group 2 Final round |
| 2 | Canada | 12 | 6 | 6 | 18 | 25 | 23 | 1.087 | 1068 | 1061 | 1.007 | |
| 3 | Finland | 12 | 6 | 6 | 16 | 24 | 27 | 0.889 | 1107 | 1137 | 0.974 | |
| 4 | Australia (Note: Qualified as hosts) (H) | 12 | 5 | 7 | 13 | 21 | 29 | 0.724 | 1112 | 1142 | 0.974 | Group 2 Final round |

(H) Host

===== Week 1 =====
- Venue: Sportcampus Lange Munte, Kortrijk, Belgium
- Venue: Country Hall Ethias Liège, Liège, Belgium

| Date | Time | | Score | | Set 1 | Set 2 | Set 3 | Set 4 | Set 5 | Total | Report |
|---|---|---|---|---|---|---|---|---|---|---|---|
| 23 May | 20:10 | Belgium | 3–0 | Australia | 30–28 | 25–19 | 25–21 | | | 80–68 | P2 P3 |
| 25 May | 16:10 | Belgium | 3–1 | Australia | 23–25 | 26–24 | 25–23 | 25–16 | | 99–88 | P2 P3 |

===== Week 2 =====
- Venue: Stampede Corral, Calgary, Canada

| Date | Time | | Score | | Set 1 | Set 2 | Set 3 | Set 4 | Set 5 | Total | Report |
|---|---|---|---|---|---|---|---|---|---|---|---|
| 31 May | 18:12 | Canada | 3–0 | Finland | 25–21 | 25–19 | 25–20 | | | 75–60 | P2 P3 |
| 1 Jun | 18:10 | Canada | 3–2 | Finland | 19–25 | 25–21 | 25–18 | 23–25 | 15–11 | 107–100 | P2 P3 |

===== Week 3 =====
- Venue: Country Hall Ethias Liège, Liège, Belgium
- Venue: AIS Arena, Canberra, Australia
- Venue: Lotto Arena, Antwerp, Belgium

| Date | Time | | Score | | Set 1 | Set 2 | Set 3 | Set 4 | Set 5 | Total | Report |
|---|---|---|---|---|---|---|---|---|---|---|---|
| 6 Jun | 20:00 | Belgium | 2–3 | Canada | 25–22 | 21–25 | 17–25 | 25–20 | 14–16 | 102–108 | P2 P3 |
| 7 Jun | 19:10 | Australia | 3–2 | Finland | 24–26 | 25–22 | 24–26 | 25–20 | 15–12 | 113–106 | P2 P3 |
| 8 Jun | 16:00 | Australia | 2–3 | Finland | 28–30 | 25–19 | 25–17 | 21–25 | 9–15 | 108–106 | P2 P3 |
| 8 Jun | 16:00 | Belgium | 3–1 | Canada | 33–31 | 25–12 | 21–25 | 25–23 | | 104–91 | P2 P3 |

===== Week 4 =====
- Venue: Doug Mitchell Thunderbird Sports Centre, University Endowment Lands, Greater Vancouver Regional District, Canada
- Venue: Tampere Ice Stadium, Tampere, Finland

| Date | Time | | Score | | Set 1 | Set 2 | Set 3 | Set 4 | Set 5 | Total | Report |
|---|---|---|---|---|---|---|---|---|---|---|---|
| 13 Jun | 19:10 | Canada | 3–0 | Belgium | 25–15 | 25–21 | 25–21 | | | 75–57 | P2 P3 |
| 14 Jun | 16:00 | Finland | 1–3 | Australia | 16–25 | 21–25 | 26–24 | 27–29 | | 90–103 | P2 P3 |
| 14 Jun | 17:10 | Canada | 1–3 | Belgium | 25–22 | 18–25 | 21–25 | 19–25 | | 83–97 | P2 P3 |
| 15 Jun | 16:00 | Finland | 3–1 | Australia | 25–16 | 23–25 | 26–24 | 25–19 | | 99–84 | P2 P3 |

===== Week 5 =====
- Venue: Lotto Arena, Antwerp, Belgium
- Venue: Rexall Place, Edmonton, Canada
- Venue: Sportcampus Lange Munte, Kortrijk, Belgium

| Date | Time | | Score | | Set 1 | Set 2 | Set 3 | Set 4 | Set 5 | Total | Report |
|---|---|---|---|---|---|---|---|---|---|---|---|
| 20 Jun | 20:00 | Belgium | 3–1 | Finland | 25–21 | 25–16 | 22–25 | 25–21 | | 97–83 | P2 P3 |
| 20 Jun | 19:10 | Canada | 2–3 | Australia | 27–25 | 25–20 | 28–30 | 17–25 | 13–15 | 110–115 | P2 P3 |
| 21 Jun | 19:10 | Canada | 3–1 | Australia | 27–25 | 25–19 | 23–25 | 25–18 | | 100–87 | P2 P3 |
| 22 Jun | 16:00 | Belgium | 2–3 | Finland | 16–25 | 20–25 | 27–25 | 25–22 | 10–15 | 98–112 | P2 P3 |

===== Week 6 =====
- Venue: Adelaide Arena, Adelaide, Australia
- Venue: Tampere Ice Stadium, Tampere, Finland

| Date | Time | | Score | | Set 1 | Set 2 | Set 3 | Set 4 | Set 5 | Total | Report |
|---|---|---|---|---|---|---|---|---|---|---|---|
| 27 Jun | 19:30 | Australia | 1–3 | Belgium | 16–25 | 21–25 | 25–18 | 20–25 | | 82–93 | P2 P3 |
| 27 Jun | 18:30 | Finland | 3–0 | Canada | 25–18 | 25–17 | 26–24 | | | 76–59 | P2 P3 |
| 28 Jun | 19:40 | Australia | 0–3 | Belgium | 20–25 | 17–25 | 19–25 | | | 56–75 | P2 P3 |
| 28 Jun | 16:00 | Finland | 0–3 | Canada | 14–25 | 24–26 | 17–25 | | | 55–76 | P2 P3 |

===== Week 7 =====
- Venue: Tampere Ice Stadium, Tampere, Finland
- Venue: Sydney Olympic Park Sports Centre, Sydney, Australia

| Date | Time | | Score | | Set 1 | Set 2 | Set 3 | Set 4 | Set 5 | Total | Report |
|---|---|---|---|---|---|---|---|---|---|---|---|
| 4 Jul | 18:30 | Finland | 3–2 | Belgium | 19–25 | 25–22 | 20–25 | 27–25 | 15–12 | 106–109 | P2 P3 |
| 5 Jul | 19:10 | Australia | 3–2 | Canada | 25–27 | 25–23 | 25–20 | 21–25 | 15–7 | 111–102 | P2 P3 |
| 5 Jul | 16:00 | Finland | 3–2 | Belgium | 23–25 | 29–27 | 22–25 | 25–23 | 15–8 | 114–108 | P2 P3 |
| 6 Jul | 16:10 | Australia | 3–1 | Canada | 22–25 | 25–22 | 25–17 | 25–18 | | 97–82 | P2 P3 |

==== Pool D ====
| Pos | Team | Pld | W | L | Pts | SW | SL | SR | SPW | SPL | SPR | Qualification |
|---|---|---|---|---|---|---|---|---|---|---|---|---|
| 1 | France | 12 | 10 | 2 | 30 | 33 | 11 | 3.000 | 1037 | 913 | 1.136 | Group 2 Final round |
| 2 | Argentina | 12 | 8 | 4 | 25 | 29 | 16 | 1.813 | 1023 | 967 | 1.058 | |
| 3 | Germany | 12 | 5 | 7 | 14 | 18 | 26 | 0.692 | 989 | 990 | 0.999 | |
| 4 | Japan | 12 | 1 | 11 | 3 | 8 | 35 | 0.229 | 868 | 1047 | 0.829 | Relegated position |

===== Week 1 =====
- Venue: Brose Arena, Bamberg, Germany
- Venue: Polideportivo Municipal Gustavo Torito Rodríguez, San Martín, Argentina

| Date | Time | | Score | | Set 1 | Set 2 | Set 3 | Set 4 | Set 5 | Total | Report |
|---|---|---|---|---|---|---|---|---|---|---|---|
| 23 May | 20:10 | Germany | 3–0 | Japan | 28–26 | 25–19 | 25–16 | | | 78–61 | P2 P3 |
| 24 May | 18:11 | Germany | 3–2 | Japan | 25–23 | 25–21 | 27–29 | 23–25 | 15–9 | 115–107 | P2 P3 |
| 24 May | 21:30 | Argentina | 2–3 | France | 25–20 | 20–25 | 25–21 | 22–25 | 12–15 | 104–106 | P2 P3 |
| 25 May | 22:11 | Argentina | 0–3 | France | 24–26 | 18–25 | 22–25 | | | 64–76 | P2 P3 |

===== Week 2 =====
- Venue: Park&Suites Arena, Montpellier, France
- Venue: Polideportivo Delmi, Salta, Argentina

| Date | Time | | Score | | Set 1 | Set 2 | Set 3 | Set 4 | Set 5 | Total | Report |
|---|---|---|---|---|---|---|---|---|---|---|---|
| 31 May | 19:10 | France | 3–0 | Japan | 25–16 | 25–18 | 25–21 | | | 75–55 | P2 P3 |
| 31 May | 20:00 | Argentina | 3–0 | Germany | 25–22 | 25–23 | 25–21 | | | 75–66 | P2 P3 |
| 1 Jun | 17:00 | France | 3–0 | Japan | 25–14 | 25–15 | 25–21 | | | 75–50 | P2 P3 |
| 1 Jun | 22:00 | Argentina | 2–3 | Germany | 25–20 | 25–20 | 20–25 | 16–25 | 13–15 | 99–105 | P2 P3 |

===== Week 3 =====
- Venue: Microestadio de Lomas de Zamora, Lomas de Zamora, Argentina
- Venue: Porsche-Arena, Stuttgart, Germany

| Date | Time | | Score | | Set 1 | Set 2 | Set 3 | Set 4 | Set 5 | Total | Report |
|---|---|---|---|---|---|---|---|---|---|---|---|
| 6 Jun | 20:05 | Argentina | 3–1 | Japan | 20–25 | 26–24 | 25–19 | 25–23 | | 96–91 | P2 P3 |
| 7 Jun | 15:40 | Germany | 0–3 | France | 19–25 | 16–25 | 22–25 | | | 57–75 | P2 P3 |
| 8 Jun | 19:10 | Germany | 1–3 | France | 25–19 | 23–25 | 20–25 | 30–32 | | 98–101 | P2 P3 |
| 8 Jun | 20:02 | Argentina | 3–0 | Japan | 25–22 | 26–24 | 25–15 | | | 76–61 | P2 P3 |

===== Week 4 =====
- Venue: Kindarena, Rouen, France
- Venue: Park Arena Komaki, Komaki, Japan
- Venue: Palais des Sports André Brouat, Toulouse, France

| Date | Time | | Score | | Set 1 | Set 2 | Set 3 | Set 4 | Set 5 | Total | Report |
|---|---|---|---|---|---|---|---|---|---|---|---|
| 13 Jun | 20:00 | France | 1–3 | Germany | 28–26 | 15–25 | 21–25 | 18–25 | | 82–101 | P2 P3 |
| 14 Jun | 14:00 | Japan | 0–3 | Argentina | 21–25 | 20–25 | 15–25 | | | 56–75 | P2 P3 |
| 15 Jun | 13:00 | Japan | 1–3 | Argentina | 21–25 | 19–25 | 25–23 | 17–25 | | 82–98 | P2 P3 |
| 15 Jun | 16:00 | France | 3–0 | Germany | 25–18 | 25–20 | 25–20 | | | 75–58 | P2 P3 |

===== Week 5 =====
- Venue: Max-Schmeling-Halle, Berlin, Germany
- Venue: Shimadzu Arena, Kyoto, Japan

| Date | Time | | Score | | Set 1 | Set 2 | Set 3 | Set 4 | Set 5 | Total | Report |
|---|---|---|---|---|---|---|---|---|---|---|---|
| 20 Jun | 20:00 | Germany | 0–3 | Argentina | 24–26 | 23–25 | 20–25 | | | 67–76 | P2 P3 |
| 21 Jun | 14:00 | Japan | 0–3 | France | 23–25 | 18–25 | 16–25 | | | 57–75 | P2 P3 |
| 21 Jun | 18:00 | Germany | 0–3 | Argentina | 16–25 | 19–25 | 21–25 | | | 56–75 | P2 P3 |
| 22 Jun | 13:00 | Japan | 1–3 | France | 16–25 | 25–19 | 25–27 | 18–25 | | 84–96 | P2 P3 |

===== Week 6 =====
- Venue: Vendéspace, Mouilleron-le-Captif, France
- Venue: Koshigaya City Gymnasium, Koshigaya, Japan
- Venue: Halle Georges Carpentier, Paris, France

| Date | Time | | Score | | Set 1 | Set 2 | Set 3 | Set 4 | Set 5 | Total | Report |
|---|---|---|---|---|---|---|---|---|---|---|---|
| 27 Jun | 20:00 | France | 2–3 | Argentina | 20–25 | 25–19 | 25–17 | 20–25 | 13–15 | 103–101 | P2 P3 |
| 28 Jun | 14:00 | Japan | 0–3 | Germany | 16–25 | 17–25 | 27–29 | | | 60–79 | P2 P3 |
| 29 Jun | 13:00 | Japan | 3–2 | Germany | 25–22 | 25–22 | 14–25 | 23–25 | 17–15 | 104–109 | P2 P3 |
| 29 Jun | 16:00 | France | 3–1 | Argentina | 25–21 | 25–22 | 23–25 | 25–16 | | 98–84 | P2 P3 |

==== Pool E ====
| Pos | Team | Pld | W | L | Pts | SW | SL | SR | SPW | SPL | SPR | Qualification |
|---|---|---|---|---|---|---|---|---|---|---|---|---|
| 1 | Netherlands | 12 | 9 | 3 | 24 | 31 | 19 | 1.632 | 1140 | 1052 | 1.084 | Group 2 Final round |
| 2 | Portugal | 12 | 6 | 6 | 19 | 24 | 23 | 1.043 | 1041 | 1032 | 1.009 | |
| 3 | Czech Republic | 12 | 6 | 6 | 15 | 23 | 27 | 0.852 | 1076 | 1119 | 0.962 | |
| 4 | South Korea | 12 | 3 | 9 | 14 | 20 | 29 | 0.690 | 1086 | 1140 | 0.953 | |

===== Week 2 =====
- Venue: Eindhoven Sports Centre, Eindhoven, Netherlands
- Venue: Pavilhão Desportivo Municipal da Póvoa de Varzim, Póvoa de Varzim, Portugal

| Date | Time | | Score | | Set 1 | Set 2 | Set 3 | Set 4 | Set 5 | Total | Report |
|---|---|---|---|---|---|---|---|---|---|---|---|
| 31 May | 15:10 | Netherlands | 3–0 | South Korea | 25–19 | 28–26 | 25–23 | | | 78–68 | P2 P3 |
| 31 May | 17:00 | Portugal | 3–1 | Czech Republic | 25–23 | 19–25 | 25–18 | 25–20 | | 94–86 | P2 P3 |
| 1 Jun | 15:10 | Netherlands | 1–3 | South Korea | 18–25 | 23–25 | 25–20 | 22–25 | | 88–95 | P2 P3 |
| 1 Jun | 17:00 | Portugal | 0–3 | Czech Republic | 23–25 | 18–25 | 22–25 | | | 63–75 | P2 P3 |

===== Week 3 =====
- Venue: Budvar Arena, České Budějovice, Czech Republic
- Venue: Topsportcentrum Almere, Almere, Netherlands

| Date | Time | | Score | | Set 1 | Set 2 | Set 3 | Set 4 | Set 5 | Total | Report |
|---|---|---|---|---|---|---|---|---|---|---|---|
| 5 Jun | 15:50 | Czech Republic | 3–2 | South Korea | 31–33 | 25–19 | 26–24 | 26–28 | 20–18 | 128–122 | P2 P3 |
| 6 Jun | 15:50 | Czech Republic | 3–2 | South Korea | 25–20 | 23–25 | 19–25 | 25–21 | 15–11 | 107–102 | P2 P3 |
| 7 Jun | 15:10 | Netherlands | 3–2 | Portugal | 25–21 | 25–13 | 19–25 | 18–25 | 16–14 | 103–98 | P2 P3 |
| 8 Jun | 15:10 | Netherlands | 2–3 | Portugal | 22–25 | 25–21 | 23–25 | 25–21 | 10–15 | 105–107 | P2 P3 |

===== Week 4 =====
- Venue: SD Arena, Chomutov, Czech Republic
- Venue: Dongchun Gymnasium, Ulsan, South Korea

| Date | Time | | Score | | Set 1 | Set 2 | Set 3 | Set 4 | Set 5 | Total | Report |
|---|---|---|---|---|---|---|---|---|---|---|---|
| 13 Jun | 15:50 | Czech Republic | 2–3 | Netherlands | 25–19 | 25–13 | 18–25 | 17–25 | 14–16 | 99–98 | P2 P3 |
| 14 Jun | 14:00 | South Korea | 1–3 | Portugal | 21–25 | 18–25 | 25–15 | 20–25 | | 84–90 | P2 P3 |
| 14 Jun | 15:50 | Czech Republic | 1–3 | Netherlands | 21–25 | 15–25 | 26–24 | 13–25 | | 75–99 | P2 P3 |
| 15 Jun | 14:00 | South Korea | 0–3 | Portugal | 20–25 | 23–25 | 18–25 | | | 61–75 | P2 P3 |

===== Week 5 =====
- Venue: Suwon Gymnasium, Suwon, South Korea
- Venue: Centro de Desportos e Congressos de Matosinhos, Matosinhos, Portugal

| Date | Time | | Score | | Set 1 | Set 2 | Set 3 | Set 4 | Set 5 | Total | Report |
|---|---|---|---|---|---|---|---|---|---|---|---|
| 21 Jun | 14:02 | South Korea | 2–3 | Czech Republic | 17–25 | 25–18 | 27–29 | 25–23 | 11–15 | 105–110 | P2 P3 |
| 21 Jun | 15:00 | Portugal | 0–3 | Netherlands | 16–25 | 23–25 | 22–25 | | | 61–75 | P2 P3 |
| 22 Jun | 14:02 | South Korea | 3–0 | Czech Republic | 25–16 | 25–23 | 27–25 | | | 77–64 | P2 P3 |
| 22 Jun | 15:00 | Portugal | 3–1 | Netherlands | 25–20 | 28–26 | 21–25 | 25–18 | | 99–89 | P2 P3 |

===== Week 6 =====
- Venue: Opava Sports Hall, Opava, Czech Republic
- Venue: Chungmu Gymnasium, Daejeon, South Korea

| Date | Time | | Score | | Set 1 | Set 2 | Set 3 | Set 4 | Set 5 | Total | Report |
|---|---|---|---|---|---|---|---|---|---|---|---|
| 27 Jun | 18:00 | Czech Republic | 3–2 | Portugal | 18–25 | 23–25 | 25–23 | 25–23 | 15–11 | 106–107 | P2 P3 |
| 28 Jun | 14:00 | South Korea | 2–3 | Netherlands | 31–29 | 16–25 | 25–23 | 30–32 | 14–16 | 116–125 | P2 P3 |
| 28 Jun | 16:00 | Czech Republic | 3–1 | Portugal | 26–24 | 25–14 | 17–25 | 25–17 | | 93–80 | P2 P3 |
| 29 Jun | 14:00 | South Korea | 2–3 | Netherlands | 21–25 | 27–25 | 25–18 | 19–25 | 9–15 | 101–108 | P2 P3 |

===== Week 7 =====
- Venue: Topsportcentrum Rotterdam, Rotterdam, Netherlands
- Venue: Pavilhão Desportivo Municipal da Póvoa de Varzim, Póvoa de Varzim, Portugal

| Date | Time | | Score | | Set 1 | Set 2 | Set 3 | Set 4 | Set 5 | Total | Report |
|---|---|---|---|---|---|---|---|---|---|---|---|
| 5 Jul | 15:00 | Netherlands | 3–1 | Czech Republic | 25–15 | 22–25 | 25–18 | 25–18 | | 97–76 | P2 P3 |
| 5 Jul | 19:00 | Portugal | 3–0 | South Korea | 25–21 | 25–22 | 25–19 | | | 75–62 | P2 P3 |
| 6 Jul | 15:00 | Netherlands | 3–0 | Czech Republic | 25–20 | 25–16 | 25–21 | | | 75–57 | P2 P3 |
| 6 Jul | 17:00 | Portugal | 1–3 | South Korea | 23–25 | 23–25 | 25–18 | 21–25 | | 92–93 | P2 P3 |

=== Group 3 ===
- The Group 3 Final Round hosts Turkey, the winners of Pool F and G and the best second team among Pool F and G will qualify for the Group 3 Final Round.

==== Pool F ====
| Pos | Team | Pld | W | L | Pts | SW | SL | SR | SPW | SPL | SPR | Qualification |
|---|---|---|---|---|---|---|---|---|---|---|---|---|
| 1 | Cuba | 6 | 5 | 1 | 15 | 16 | 5 | 3.200 | 516 | 480 | 1.075 | Group 3 Final round |
| 2 | Turkey (Note: Qualified as hosts) (H) | 6 | 4 | 2 | 13 | 15 | 9 | 1.667 | 585 | 539 | 1.085 | Group 3 Final round |
| 3 | Mexico | 6 | 2 | 4 | 6 | 8 | 14 | 0.571 | 490 | 519 | 0.944 | |
| 4 | Tunisia | 6 | 1 | 5 | 2 | 6 | 17 | 0.353 | 486 | 539 | 0.902 | |

(H) Host

===== Week 3 =====
- Venue: Palacio de los Deportes Juan Escutia, Mexico City, Mexico

| Date | Time | | Score | | Set 1 | Set 2 | Set 3 | Set 4 | Set 5 | Total | Report |
|---|---|---|---|---|---|---|---|---|---|---|---|
| 6 Jun | 17:00 | Turkey | 1–3 | Cuba | 18–25 | 26–24 | 21–25 | 31–33 | | 96–107 | P2 P3 |
| 6 Jun | 19:51 | Mexico | 3–0 | Tunisia | 25–22 | 25–18 | 25–22 | | | 75–62 | P2 P3 |
| 7 Jun | 15:30 | Tunisia | 1–3 | Cuba | 24–26 | 25–23 | 19–25 | 21–25 | | 89–99 | P2 P3 |
| 7 Jun | 18:00 | Mexico | 3–2 | Turkey | 23–25 | 31–29 | 16–25 | 27–25 | 19–17 | 116–121 | P2 P3 |
| 8 Jun | 14:00 | Turkey | 3–1 | Tunisia | 25–18 | 25–20 | 15–25 | 25–22 | | 90–85 | P2 P3 |
| 8 Jun | 16:30 | Mexico | 0–3 | Cuba | 21–25 | 21–25 | 22–25 | | | 64–75 | P2 P3 |

===== Week 4 =====
- Venue: El Menzah Sports Palace, Tunis, Tunisia

| Date | Time | | Score | | Set 1 | Set 2 | Set 3 | Set 4 | Set 5 | Total | Report |
|---|---|---|---|---|---|---|---|---|---|---|---|
| 13 Jun | 15:00 | Tunisia | 1–3 | Turkey | 25–16 | 17–25 | 18–25 | 19–25 | | 79–91 | P2 P3 |
| 13 Jun | 17:30 | Mexico | 0–3 | Cuba | 23–25 | 16–25 | 20–25 | | | 59–75 | P2 P3 |
| 14 Jun | 15:00 | Tunisia | 0–3 | Cuba | 21–25 | 20–25 | 23–25 | | | 64–75 | P2 P3 |
| 14 Jun | 17:30 | Mexico | 0–3 | Turkey | 22–25 | 18–25 | 27–29 | | | 67–79 | P2 P3 |
| 15 Jun | 15:00 | Turkey | 3–1 | Cuba | 33–35 | 25–14 | 25–17 | 25–19 | | 108–85 | P2 P3 |
| 15 Jun | 17:43 | Tunisia | 3–2 | Mexico | 25–23 | 25–23 | 21–25 | 21–25 | 15–13 | 107–109 | P2 P3 |

==== Pool G ====
| Pos | Team | Pld | W | L | Pts | SW | SL | SR | SPW | SPL | SPR | Qualification |
|---|---|---|---|---|---|---|---|---|---|---|---|---|
| 1 | China | 6 | 5 | 1 | 14 | 15 | 6 | 2.500 | 507 | 464 | 1.093 | Group 3 Final round |
| 2 | Slovakia | 6 | 3 | 3 | 11 | 14 | 11 | 1.273 | 557 | 553 | 1.007 | Group 3 Final round |
| 3 | Spain | 6 | 2 | 4 | 6 | 11 | 16 | 0.688 | 585 | 605 | 0.967 | |
| 4 | Puerto Rico | 6 | 2 | 4 | 5 | 9 | 16 | 0.563 | 541 | 568 | 0.952 | |

===== Week 3 =====
- Venue: Coliseo Guillermo Angulo, Carolina, Puerto Rico

| Date | Time | | Score | | Set 1 | Set 2 | Set 3 | Set 4 | Set 5 | Total | Report |
|---|---|---|---|---|---|---|---|---|---|---|---|
| 6 Jun | 17:14 | Slovakia | 3–1 | Spain | 25–13 | 18–25 | 25–20 | 28–26 | | 96–84 | P2 P3 |
| 6 Jun | 20:13 | Puerto Rico | 0–3 | China | 20–25 | 23–25 | 22–25 | | | 65–75 | P2 P3 |
| 7 Jun | 17:11 | Spain | 0–3 | China | 29–31 | 18–25 | 23–25 | | | 70–81 | P2 P3 |
| 7 Jun | 20:12 | Puerto Rico | 3–2 | Slovakia | 22–25 | 25–21 | 25–19 | 19–25 | 15–10 | 106–100 | P2 P3 |
| 8 Jun | 17:11 | China | 3–1 | Slovakia | 23–25 | 25–20 | 25–22 | 25–18 | | 98–85 | P2 P3 |
| 8 Jun | 20:10 | Puerto Rico | 2–3 | Spain | 24–26 | 25–18 | 20–25 | 25–21 | 17–19 | 111–109 | P2 P3 |

===== Week 4 =====
- Venue: Steel Aréna, Košice, Slovakia

| Date | Time | | Score | | Set 1 | Set 2 | Set 3 | Set 4 | Set 5 | Total | Report |
|---|---|---|---|---|---|---|---|---|---|---|---|
| 13 Jun | 17:30 | Slovakia | 3–1 | Puerto Rico | 25–21 | 25–22 | 24–26 | 25–19 | | 99–88 | P2 P3 |
| 13 Jun | 20:30 | China | 3–2 | Spain | 22–25 | 25–19 | 22–25 | 25–20 | 16–14 | 110–103 | P2 P3 |
| 14 Jun | 15:00 | China | 0–3 | Slovakia | 20–25 | 23–25 | 20–25 | | | 63–75 | P2 P3 |
| 14 Jun | 18:00 | Spain | 2–3 | Puerto Rico | 22–25 | 25–20 | 25–20 | 20–25 | 13–15 | 105–105 | P2 P3 |
| 15 Jun | 15:00 | Spain | 3–2 | Slovakia | 27–29 | 25–21 | 22–25 | 25–17 | 15–10 | 114–102 | P2 P3 |
| 15 Jun | 18:00 | Puerto Rico | 0–3 | China | 28–30 | 18–25 | 20–25 | | | 66–80 | P2 P3 |

== Final round ==
=== Group 3 ===
- Venue: Cengiz Göllü Volleyball Hall, Bursa, Turkey
- All times are Eastern European Summer Time (UTC+03:00).

==== Final four (Week 6) ====
Semifinals
28 June
Turkey | 3
Slovakia | 0
28 June
Cuba | 3
China | 2

Final
29 June
Turkey | 2
Cuba | 3
3rd place match
29 June
China | 3
Slovakia | 1

===== Semifinals =====
| Date | Time | | Score | | Set 1 | Set 2 | Set 3 | Set 4 | Set 5 | Total | Report |
|---|---|---|---|---|---|---|---|---|---|---|---|
| 28 Jun | 14:00 | Cuba | 3–2 | China | 27–25 | 22–25 | 32–34 | 25–22 | 15–13 | 121–119 | P2 P3 |
| 28 Jun | 17:05 | Turkey | 3–0 | Slovakia | 25–22 | 25–21 | 26–24 | | | 76–67 | P2 P3 |

===== 3rd place match =====
| Date | Time | | Score | | Set 1 | Set 2 | Set 3 | Set 4 | Set 5 | Total | Report |
|---|---|---|---|---|---|---|---|---|---|---|---|
| 29 Jun | 14:00 | China | 3–1 | Slovakia | 21–25 | 39–37 | 25–23 | 25–19 | | 110–104 | P2 P3 |

===== Final =====
| Date | Time | | Score | | Set 1 | Set 2 | Set 3 | Set 4 | Set 5 | Total | Report |
|---|---|---|---|---|---|---|---|---|---|---|---|
| 29 Jun | 17:00 | Turkey | 2–3 | Cuba | 26–24 | 19–25 | 25–20 | 21–25 | 14–16 | 105–110 | P2 P3 |

=== Group 2 ===
- Venue: Sydney Olympic Park Sports Centre, Sydney, Australia
- All times are Australian Eastern Standard Time (UTC+10:00).

==== Final four (Week 8) ====
Semifinals
11 July
Belgium | 0
France | 3
11 July
Australia | 3
Netherlands | 0

Final
12 July
France | 2
Australia | 3
3rd place match
12 July
Belgium | 3
Netherlands | 0

===== Semifinals =====
| Date | Time | | Score | | Set 1 | Set 2 | Set 3 | Set 4 | Set 5 | Total | Report |
|---|---|---|---|---|---|---|---|---|---|---|---|
| 11 Jul | 17:40 | Belgium | 0–3 | France | 24–26 | 21–25 | 19–25 | | | 64–76 | P2 P3 |
| 11 Jul | 20:10 | Australia | 3–0 | Netherlands | 25–23 | 25–12 | 27–25 | | | 77–60 | P2 P3 |

===== 3rd place match =====
| Date | Time | | Score | | Set 1 | Set 2 | Set 3 | Set 4 | Set 5 | Total | Report |
|---|---|---|---|---|---|---|---|---|---|---|---|
| 12 Jul | 17:40 | Belgium | 3–0 | Netherlands | 25–17 | 25–22 | 25–21 | | | 75–60 | P2 P3 |

===== Final =====
| Date | Time | | Score | | Set 1 | Set 2 | Set 3 | Set 4 | Set 5 | Total | Report |
|---|---|---|---|---|---|---|---|---|---|---|---|
| 12 Jul | 20:10 | France | 2–3 | Australia | 20–25 | 25–22 | 22–25 | 25–23 | 14–16 | 106–111 | P2 P3 |

=== Group 1 ===
- Venue: Nelson Mandela Forum, Florence, Italy
- All times are Central European Summer Time (UTC+02:00).

==== Pool play (Week 9) ====
===== Pool H =====
| Pos | Team | Pld | W | L | Pts | SW | SL | SR | SPW | SPL | SPR | Qualification |
|---|---|---|---|---|---|---|---|---|---|---|---|---|
| 1 | Italy | 2 | 2 | 0 | 6 | 6 | 0 | MAX | 151 | 124 | 1.218 | Semifinals |
| 2 | United States | 2 | 1 | 1 | 3 | 3 | 4 | 0.750 | 164 | 161 | 1.019 | Semifinals |
| 3 | Australia | 2 | 0 | 2 | 0 | 1 | 6 | 0.167 | 142 | 172 | 0.826 | |

| Date | Time | | Score | | Set 1 | Set 2 | Set 3 | Set 4 | Set 5 | Total | Report |
|---|---|---|---|---|---|---|---|---|---|---|---|
| 16 Jul | 20:45 | Italy | 3–0 | United States | 25–22 | 25–21 | 26–24 | | | 76–67 | P2 P3 |
| 17 Jul | 20:30 | United States | 3–1 | Australia | 22–25 | 25–18 | 25–23 | 25–19 | | 97–85 | P2 P3 |
| 18 Jul | 20:30 | Australia | 0–3 | Italy | 14–25 | 22–25 | 21–25 | | | 57–75 | P2 P3 |

===== Pool I =====
| Pos | Team | Pld | W | L | Pts | SW | SL | SR | SPW | SPL | SPR | Qualification |
|---|---|---|---|---|---|---|---|---|---|---|---|---|
| 1 | Iran | 2 | 1 | 1 | 4 | 5 | 4 | 1.250 | 210 | 209 | 1.005 | Semifinals |
| 2 | Brazil | 2 | 1 | 1 | 3 | 4 | 4 | 1.000 | 189 | 195 | 0.969 | Semifinals |
| 3 | Russia | 2 | 1 | 1 | 2 | 4 | 5 | 0.800 | 212 | 207 | 1.024 | |

| Date | Time | | Score | | Set 1 | Set 2 | Set 3 | Set 4 | Set 5 | Total | Report |
|---|---|---|---|---|---|---|---|---|---|---|---|
| 16 Jul | 17:30 | Iran | 2–3 | Russia | 25–18 | 18–25 | 21–25 | 37–35 | 8–15 | 109–118 | P2 P3 |
| 17 Jul | 17:30 | Russia | 1–3 | Brazil | 24–26 | 25–22 | 23–25 | 22–25 | | 94–98 | P2 P3 |
| 18 Jul | 17:30 | Brazil | 1–3 | Iran | 21–25 | 19–25 | 25–23 | 26–28 | | 91–101 | P2 P3 |

==== Final four (Week 9) ====
Semifinals
19 July
Iran | 0
United States | 3
19 July
Italy | 0
Brazil | 3

Final
20 July
United States | 3
Brazil | 1
3rd place match
20 July
Iran | 0
Italy | 3

===== Semifinals =====
| Date | Time | | Score | | Set 1 | Set 2 | Set 3 | Set 4 | Set 5 | Total | Report |
|---|---|---|---|---|---|---|---|---|---|---|---|
| 19 Jul | 17:30 | Iran | 0–3 | United States | 18–25 | 22–25 | 16–25 | | | 56–75 | P2 P3 |
| 19 Jul | 20:30 | Italy | 0–3 | Brazil | 11–25 | 23–25 | 20–25 | | | 54–75 | P2 P3 |

===== 3rd place match =====
| Date | Time | | Score | | Set 1 | Set 2 | Set 3 | Set 4 | Set 5 | Total | Report |
|---|---|---|---|---|---|---|---|---|---|---|---|
| 20 Jul | 17:30 | Iran | 0–3 | Italy | 22–25 | 18–25 | 22–25 | | | 62–75 | P2 P3 |

===== Final =====
| Date | Time | | Score | | Set 1 | Set 2 | Set 3 | Set 4 | Set 5 | Total | Report |
|---|---|---|---|---|---|---|---|---|---|---|---|
| 20 Jul | 20:30 | United States | 3–1 | Brazil | 31–29 | 21–25 | 25–20 | 25–23 | | 102–97 | P2 P3 |

== Final standing ==
| Rank | Team |
|---|---|
| 1st place, gold medalist(s) | United States |
| 2nd place, silver medalist(s) | Brazil |
| 3rd place, bronze medalist(s) | Italy |
| 4 | Iran |
| 5 | Russia |
| 5 | Australia |
| 7 | Serbia |
| 8 | Bulgaria |
| 8 | Poland |
| 10 | France |
| 11 | Belgium |
| 12 | Netherlands |
| 13 | Argentina |
| 13 | Canada |
| 13 | Portugal |
| 16 | Czech Republic |
| 16 | Finland |
| 16 | Germany |
| 19 | Japan |
| 19 | South Korea |
| 21 | Cuba |
| 22 | Turkey |
| 23 | China |
| 24 | Slovakia |
| 25 | Mexico |
| 25 | Spain |
| 27 | Puerto Rico |
| 27 | Tunisia |

2014 World League champions

United States
2nd title

12-man Roster for Group 1 Final Round
Anderson, Rooney (c), Sander, Lee, Lotman, K. Shoji, Christenson, Holmes, Clark, Holt, Muagututia, E. Shoji
Head coach
Speraw

== Awards ==
- Most valuable player
  (United States) Taylor Sander
- Best setter
  (Iran) Saeid Marouf
- Best outside spikers
  (United States) Taylor Sander
  (Brazil) Ricardo Lucarelli
- Best middle blockers
  (United States) David Lee
  (Brazil) Lucas Saatkamp
- Best opposite spiker
  (Brazil) Wallace de Souza
- Best libero
  (Italy) Salvatore Rossini

== Prize money ==
Prize Money for the Final Standing

Champions – $1,000,000
Runners-up – $500,000
3rd place – $300,000
4th place – $150,000
5th place – $75,000 (2 teams)

Prize Money for the Awards

Most Valuable Player – $30,000
Best Setter – $10,000
Best Outside Spiker – $10,000 (2 players)
Best Middle Blocker – $10,000 (2 players)
Best Opposite Spiker – $10,000
Best Libero – $10,000
