= Ranjit Singh (volleyball) =

Volleyball player

Ranjit Singh is an Indian Volleyball player who participated in the 3rd All India volleyball tournament in 2016. He was also named Most Valuable Player in Boys' U18 volleyball. He plays for Ahmedabad Defenders in the Pro Volleyball League.
