= 2023 FIVB Volleyball Men's Club World Championship =

International volleyball men's club competition

2023 Men's Club World Championship
Tournament details
- Host country: India
- City: Bangalore
- Dates: 6–10 December
- Teams: 6 (from 3 confederations)
- Venue: 1 (in 1 host city)

Final positions
- Champions: (Italy) Sir Sicoma Perugia (2nd title)

Tournament awards
- MVP: (Ukraine) Oleh Plotnytskyi
- Best Setter: (Italy) Simone Giannelli
- Best OH: (Ukraine) Oleh Plotnytskyi; (Brazil) Marcus Vinícius
- Best MB: (Argentina) Sebastián Solé; (Brazil) Renan Michelucci
- Best OPP: (Russia) Dmitry Muserskiy
- Best Libero: (Brazil) Maique Nascimento

Tournament statistics
- Matches played: 10
- Attendance: 11,746 (1,175 per match)

The 2023 FIVB Volleyball Men's Club World Championship was the 18th edition of the competition. It was held in Bangalore, India. The tournament took place from 6 to 10 December 2023.

Sir Sicoma Perugia won their second title after defeating Itambé Minas in straight sets (3–0) in the final. Itambé Minas settle for silver and its also their first medal of the tournament. Suntory Sunbirds claimed bronze after they reverse sweeped Halkbank Spor Kulübü for the 3rd place match. Oleh Plotnytskyi was named the MVP of the tournament.

This were Ahmedabad Defenders, Halkbank Spor Kulübü and Suntory Sunbirds' first appearance at the Club World Championship.

== Qualification ==
Team (Confederation)	Qualified as
(India) Ahmedabad Defenders (AVC)	Hosts
(Brazil) Sada Cruzeiro Vôlei (CSV)	2023 South American champions
(Brazil) Itambé Minas (CSV)	2023 South American runners-up
(Poland) ~~ZAKSA Kędzierzyn-Koźle~~ (Note: ZAKSA Kędzierzyn-Koźle withdrew to participate in the Club World Championship for the third time, citing a hectic schedule in the pre-Olympic season and concerns about the risks of traveling to India while competing. They were replaced by Halkbank Spor Kulübü.) (CEV)	2023 European champions
(Poland) ~~Jastrzębski Węgiel~~ (Note: Jastrzębski Węgiel declined the invitation to participate in the Club World Championship citing health and logistical concerns. They were replaced by Sir Sicoma Perugia.) (CEV)	2023 European runners-up
(Japan) Suntory Sunbirds (AVC)	2023 Asian champions
(Turkey) Halkbank Spor Kulübü(CEV)	Wild card
(Italy) Sir Sicoma Perugia (CEV)	Wild card

== Venue ==
All matches
Bangalore, India
Koramangala Indoor Stadium

== Format ==
=== Preliminary round ===
Six teams are divided into two pools of three teams each in a round-robin match. The top two teams of each pool advance to the semifinals.

=== Final round ===
Semifinals
A1 vs. B2
B1 vs. A2

Finals
Gold match: SFW1 vs. SFW2
Bronze march: SFL1 vs. SFL2

== Pools composition ==
Pool A	Pool B
(India) Ahmedabad Defenders	(Brazil) Sada Cruzeiro Vôlei
(Brazil) Itambé Minas	(Japan) Suntory Sunbirds
(Italy) Sir Sicoma Perugia	(Turkey) Halkbank Spor Kulübü

== Pool standing procedure ==
1. Number of victories
2. Match points
3. Sets ratio
4. Points ratio
5. Result of the last match between the tied teams.

Match won 3–0 or 3–1: 3 match points for the winner and 0 match point for the loser.

Match won 3–2: 2 match points for the winner and 1 match point for the loser.

== Preliminary round ==
- All times are Time in India (UTC+05:30).

=== Pool A ===
Pos	Team	Pld	W	L	Pts	SW	SL	SR	SPW	SPL	SPR	Qualification
1	(Italy) Sir Sicoma Perugia	2	2	0	6	6	0	MAX	151	112	1.348	Semifinals
2	(Brazil) Itambé Minas	2	1	1	3	3	3	1.000	139	140	0.993	Semifinals
3	(India) Ahmedabad Defenders	2	0	2	0	0	6	0.000	112	150	0.747	

Source: Men's Club World Champs 2023 – Standings

Date	Time		Score		Set 1	Set 2	Set 3	Set 4	Set 5	Total	Report
6 Dec	20:30	Ahmedabad Defenders (India)	0–3	(Brazil) Itambé Minas	22–25	23–25	19–25			64–75	P2 Report
7 Dec	20:30	Sir Sicoma Perugia (Italy)	3–0	(Brazil) Itambé Minas	25–18	26–24	25–22			76–64	P2 Report
8 Dec	20:30	Ahmedabad Defenders (India)	0–3	(Italy) Sir Sicoma Perugia	18–25	19–25	11–25			48–75	P2 Report

=== Pool B ===
Pos	Team	Pld	W	L	Pts	SW	SL	SR	SPW	SPL	SPR	Qualification
1	(Japan) Suntory Sunbirds	2	1	1	4	5	3	1.667	192	183	1.049	Semifinals
2	(Turkey) Halkbank Spor Kulübü	2	1	1	3	3	3	1.000	141	143	0.986	Semifinals
3	(Brazil) Sada Cruzeiro Vôlei	2	1	1	2	3	5	0.600	189	196	0.964	

Source: Men's Club World Champs 2023 – Standings

Date	Time		Score		Set 1	Set 2	Set 3	Set 4	Set 5	Total	Report
6 Dec	17:00	Halkbank Spor Kulübü (Turkey)	0–3	(Japan) Suntory Sunbirds	23–25	23–25	16–25			62–75	P2 Report
7 Dec	17:00	Sada Cruzeiro Vôlei (Brazil)	3–2	(Japan) Suntory Sunbirds	25–21	31–29	28–30	22–25	15–12	121–117	P2 Report
8 Dec	17:00	Halkbank Spor Kulübü (Turkey)	3–0	(Brazil) Sada Cruzeiro Vôlei	26–24	25–18	28–26			79–68	P2 Report

== Final round ==
- All times are Time in India (UTC+05:30).

Semifinals
9 December
(Italy) Sir Sicoma Perugia	3
(Turkey) Halkbank Spor Kulübü	0
9 December
(Japan) Suntory Sunbirds	2
(Brazil) Itambé Minas	3

Final
10 December
(Italy) Sir Sicoma Perugia	3
(Brazil) Itambé Minas	0
3rd place match
10 December
(Turkey) Halkbank Spor Kulübü	2
(Japan) Suntory Sunbirds	3

=== Semifinals ===
Date	Time		Score		Set 1	Set 2	Set 3	Set 4	Set 5	Total	Report
9 Dec	17:00	Sir Sicoma Perugia (Italy)	3–0	(Turkey) Halkbank Spor Kulübü	25–14	25–16	31–29			81–59	P2 Report
9 Dec	20:30	Suntory Sunbirds (Japan)	2–3	(Brazil) Itambé Minas	25–22	22–25	30–28	20–25	15–17	112–117	P2 Report

=== 3rd place match ===
Date	Time		Score		Set 1	Set 2	Set 3	Set 4	Set 5	Total	Report
9 Dec	17:00	Halkbank Spor Kulübü (Turkey)	2–3	(Japan) Suntory Sunbirds	25–17	25–23	21–25	19–25	12–15	102–105	P2 Report

=== Final ===
Date	Time		Score		Set 1	Set 2	Set 3	Set 4	Set 5	Total	Report
9 Dec	20:30	Sir Sicoma Perugia (Italy)	3–0	(Brazil) Itambé Minas	25–13	25–21	25–19			75–53	P2 Report

== Final standing ==
Rank	Team
1st place, gold medalist(s)	(Italy) Sir Sicoma Perugia
2nd place, silver medalist(s)	(Brazil) Itambé Minas
3rd place, bronze medalist(s)	(Japan) Suntory Sunbirds
4	(Turkey) Halkbank Spor Kulübü
5	(Brazil) Sada Cruzeiro Vôlei
6	(India) Ahmedabad Defenders

Source: Men's CWC 2023 – Final Standings

2023 Club World champions
(Italy)
Sir Sicoma Perugia
Second title

Team
Davide Candellaro, Tim Held, Simone Giannelli, Jesús Herrera, Alessandro Toscani, Wilfredo León (c), Wassim Ben Tara, Sebastián Solé, Roberto Russo, Massimo Colaci, Flávio Gualberto, Kamil Semeniuk, Oleh Plotnytskyi, Gregor Ropret
Coach
(Italy) Angelo Lorenzetti

== Awards ==
- Most valuable player
  (Ukraine) Oleh Plotnytskyi (Sir Sicoma Perugia)
- Best setter
  (Italy) Simone Giannelli (Sir Sicoma Perugia)
- Best outside spikers
  (Ukraine) Oleh Plotnytskyi (Sir Sicoma Perugia)
  (Brazil) Marcus Vinícius (Itambé Minas)
- Best middle blockers
  (Argentina) Sebastián Solé (Sir Sicoma Perugia)
  (Brazil) Renan Michelucci (Itambé Minas)
- Best opposite spiker
  (Russia) Dmitry Muserskiy (Suntory Sunbirds)
- Best libero
  (Brazil) Maique Nascimento (Itambé Minas)

== See also ==
- 2023 FIVB Volleyball Women's Club World Championship
