= 2022 Prime Volleyball League =

- League: Prime Volleyball League
- Sport: Men's volleyball
- Duration: 5 – 27 February 2022
- Teams: 7

Finals
- Champions: Kolkata Thunderbolts (1st title)
- Runners-up: Ahmedabad Defenders
- Finals MVP: Vinit Kumar (Kolkata Thunderbolts)

Prime Volleyball League seasons
- 2019 Pro Volleyball League 2023

2022 Prime Volleyball League (also known as PVL 2022, or for sponsorship reasons, RuPay PVL 2022) is the inaugural season of the Prime Volleyball League, a franchise based Indian Indoor Volleyball League which is organized by Baseline Ventures. This edition of the league will feature seven teams from Ahmedabad, Bengaluru, Calicut, Chennai, Hyderabad, Kochi and Kolkata and the tournament is scheduled to be held at Gachibowli Indoor Stadium in Hyderabad from 5 to 27 February 2022.

== Format ==
In the inaugural season, seven teams are participating, engaging in a total of 24 matches. Each team competes against every other team in a single round-robin format, leading to the top 4 teams advancing to the playoffs.

== Venue ==
The tournament was earlier scheduled to be held in Kochi but later moved to Hyderabad due to the COVID-19 pandemic in India. All the matches were held at the Gachibowli Indoor Stadium in Hyderabad.

== League standings ==
Pos	Team	Pld	W	L	Pts	SW	SL	SR	SPW	SPL	SPR	Qualification
1	Ahmedabad Defenders	6	5	1	10	18	12	1.500	406	396	1.025	Qualified for play-offs
2	Kolkata Thunderbolts	6	4	2	8	18	12	1.500	402	375	1.072	Qualified for play-offs
3	Calicut Heroes	6	3	3	7	18	12	1.500	409	387	1.057	Qualified for play-offs
4	Hyderabad Black Hawks	6	3	3	7	15	15	1.000	400	391	1.023	Qualified for play-offs
5	Bengaluru Torpedoes	6	3	3	6	13	17	0.765	396	413	0.959	
6	Chennai Blitz	6	2	4	4	11	19	0.579	383	414	0.925	
7	Kochi Blue Spikers	6	1	5	2	12	18	0.667	388	408	0.951	

== League stage ==
Date	Time		Score		Set 1	Set 2	Set 3	Set 4	Set 5	Total	Report
5 Feb	19:00	Hyderabad Black Hawks	4–1	Kochi Blue Spikers	15–12	15–11	15–11	15–10	13–15	73–59	P2
6 Feb	19:00	Chennai Blitz	2–3	Ahmedabad Defenders	13–15	11–15	15–11	13–15	15–11	67–67	P2
7 Feb	19:00	Calicut Heroes	2–3	Kolkata Thunderbolts	13–15	15–12	10–15	15–12	13–15	66–69	P2
8 Feb	19:00	Bengaluru Torpedoes	3–2	Kochi Blue Spikers	14–15	12–15	15–13	15–9	15–14	71–66	P2
9 Feb	19:00	Calicut Heroes	2–3	Ahmedabad Defenders	15–12	11–15	15–10	12–15	11–15	64–67	P2
10 Feb	19:00	Ahmedabad Defenders	4–1	Hyderabad Black Hawks	15–13	15–10	15–12	15–8	9–15	69–58	P2
11 Feb	19:00	Bengaluru Torpedoes	3–2	Hyderabad Black Hawks	15–12	14–15	15–12	11–15	15–13	70–67	P2
11 Feb	21:00	Chennai Blitz	1–4	Kolkata Thunderbolts	15–10	11–15	10–15	12–15	13–15	61–70	P2
12 Feb	19:00	Bengaluru Torpedoes	1–4	Kolkata Thunderbolts	13–15	8–15	15–9	12–15	10–15	58–69	P2
13 Feb	19:00	Hyderabad Black Hawks	5–0	Chennai Blitz	15–14	15–11	15–14	15–7	15–13	75–59	P2
14 Feb	19:00	Calicut Heroes	4–1	Bengaluru Torpedoes	15–12	15–12	15–9	14–15	15–13	74–61	P2
15 Feb	19:00	Kolkata Thunderbolts	2–3	Hyderabad Black Hawks	8–15	15–13	9–15	12–15	15–8	59–66	P2
16 Feb	19:00	Chennai Blitz	2–3	Kochi Blue Spikers	12–15	11–15	15–14	15–12	10–15	63–71	P2
17 Feb	19:00	Chennai Blitz	3–2	Calicut Heroes	15–14	15–9	15–14	10–15	12–15	67–67	P2
17 Feb	21:00	Ahmedabad Defenders	2–3	Bengaluru Torpedoes	14–15	13–15	14–15	15–14	15–13	71–72	P2
18 Feb	19:00	Calicut Heroes	3–2	Kochi Blue Spikers	15–12	15–9	9–15	9–15	15–11	63–62	P2
19 Feb	19:00	Kolkata Thunderbolts	2–3	Ahmedabad Defenders	15–7	10–15	13–15	14–15	15–10	67–62	P2
20 Feb	19:00	Chennai Blitz	3–2	Bengaluru Torpedoes	9–15	15–12	15–13	15–9	12–15	66–64	P2
21 Feb	19:00	Calicut Heroes	5–0	Hyderabad Black Hawks	15–14	15–10	15–14	15–14	15–9	75–61	P2
22 Feb	19:00	Ahmedabad Defenders	3–2	Kochi Blue Spikers	15–14	15–14	11–15	14–15	15–10	70–68	P2
23 Feb	19:00	Kolkata Thunderbolts	3–2	Kochi Blue Spikers	13–15	15–11	15–13	15–8	10–15	68–62	P2

== Play-offs ==
=== Semifinals ===
Top four teams of League stage are qualified to two different semifinal pairs.

==== Semifinal 1 ====
Date	Time		Score		Set 1	Set 2	Set 3	Set 4	Set 5	Total	Report
24 Feb	19:00	Ahmedabad Defenders	3–1	Hyderabad Black Hawks	15–13	15–12	9–15	15–12		54–52	P2

==== Semifinal 2 ====
Date	Time		Score		Set 1	Set 2	Set 3	Set 4	Set 5	Total	Report
25 Feb	19:00	Kolkata Thunderbolts	3–0	Calicut Heroes	16–14	15–10	17–15			48–39	P2

=== Finals ===
==== Final ====
Date	Time		Score		Set 1	Set 2	Set 3	Set 4	Set 5	Total	Report
27 Feb	19:00	Ahmedabad Defenders	0–3	Kolkata Thunderbolts	13–15	10–15	12–15			35–45	P2

== Final standings ==
Rank	Team
1st place, gold medalist(s)	Kolkata Thunderbolts
2nd place, silver medalist(s)	Ahmedabad Defenders
3rd place, bronze medalist(s)	Calicut Heroes
3rd place, bronze medalist(s)	Hyderabad Black Hawks
5	Bengaluru Torpedoes
6	Chennai Blitz
7	Kochi Blue Spikers

2022 Champions

Maiden title

Team Roster
Sujoy Dutta, Anu James, Tharun Gowda K, Mohamed Riyazudeen, Rahul Ramesh K Ashwal Rai (c), Matthew August, Shameemudeen A, Vinit Kumar, Ian Woo Satterfield, Aravindhan S, Janshad U, Hari Prasad B S, Muhammed Eqbal T N
Head coach
Sunny Joseph

== Awards ==
Player	Team	Award
Vinit Kumar	Kolkata Thunderbolts	Player of the Final Match
Shon T John	Ahmedabad Defenders	Fantasy Player of the Season
Angamuthu Ramaswamy	Ahmedabad Defenders	Spiker of the Season
John Joseph E J	Hyderabad Black Hawks	Blocker of the Season
Guru Prasanth SV	Hyderabad Black Hawks	Emerging Player of the Season
Vinit Kumar	Kolkata Thunderbolts	Most Valuable Player
