= David Kisiel =

American volleyball player (born 1997)

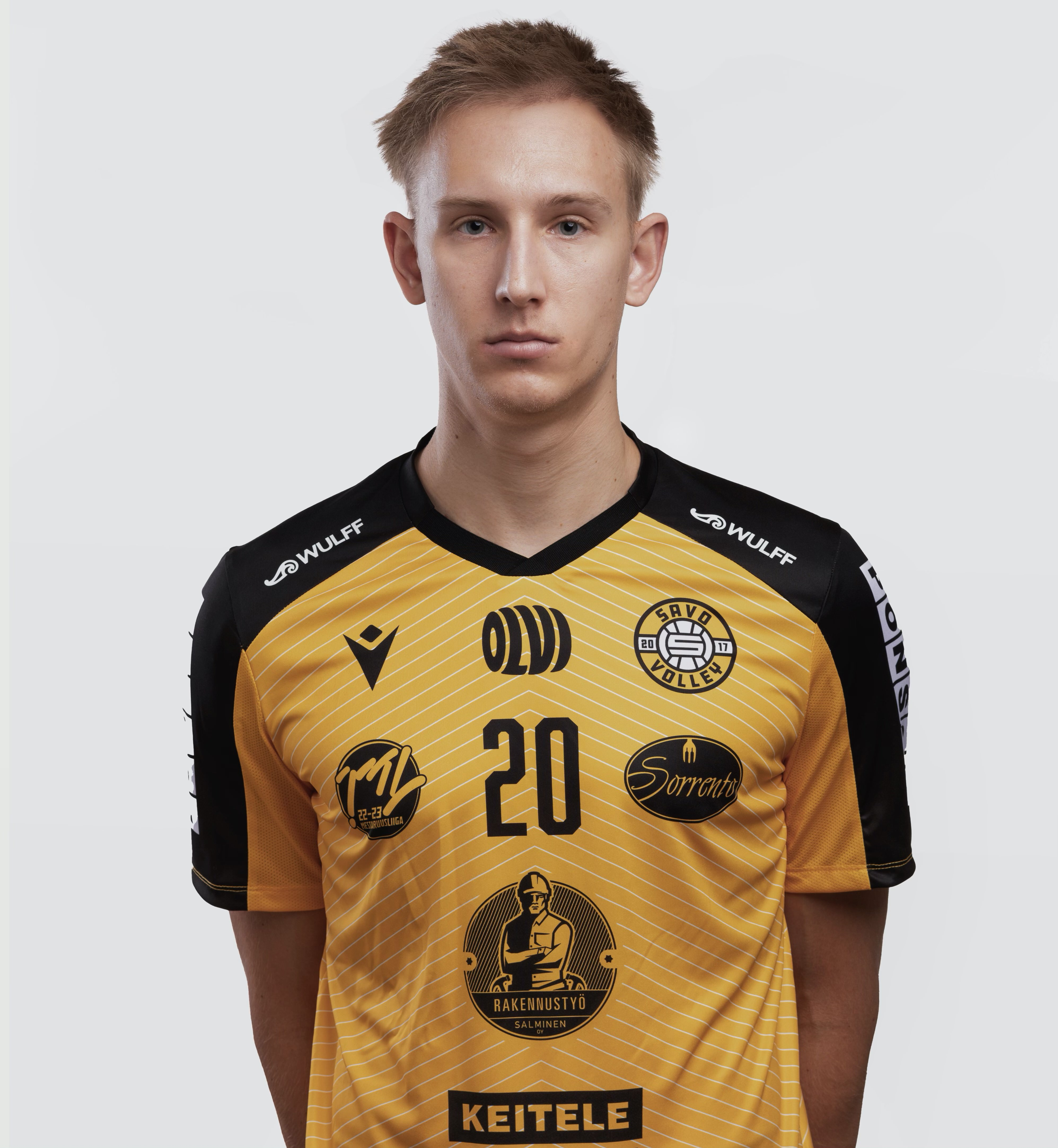

Personal information
- Full name: David Kisiel
- Born: October 4, 1997 (age 29); Glendale, Arizona, US
- Height: 1.96 m (6 ft 5 in)
- Weight: 89 kg (196 lb)
- Spike: 351 cm (138 in)
- Block: 335 cm (132 in)
- Education: Grand Canyon University

Volleyball information
- Position: Opposite/Outside
- Current club: The Begin Volley Ancona
- Number: 1

Career
Years	Teams
2016–2021	(United States) Grand Canyon
2021–2022	(Netherlands) VC Limac
2022–2023	(Finland) Savo Volley
2023–2023	(Azerbaijan) Khari Bulbul Şuşa VC
2024–2024	(India) Kolkata Thunderbolts
2024–	(Italy) The Begin Volley Ancona

David Kisiel (born October 4, 1997) is an American volleyball player who plays as an opposite hitter in the Finland Volleyball League and CEV Champions League. Kisiel started his professional career in 2021 with Dutch club, VC Limac. For the 2022–2023 season, he joined Finnish club, Savo Volley.He currently plays for The Begin Volley Ancona in Italy.

== Personal life ==
Kisiel is from Glendale, Arizona, and attended high school at Ironwood High School. He studied computer science and business while playing volleyball for 5 years at Grand Canyon University

== Career ==
=== Professional clubs ===
- (Netherlands) VC Limac (2021–2022)
- (Finland) Savo Volley (2022–2023)
- (Azerbaijan) Khari Bulbul Şuşa VC (2023-2023)
- (India) Kolkata Thunderbolts (2024-2024)
- (Italy) The Begin Volley Ancona (2024-
