= Paul Lotman =

American volleyball player

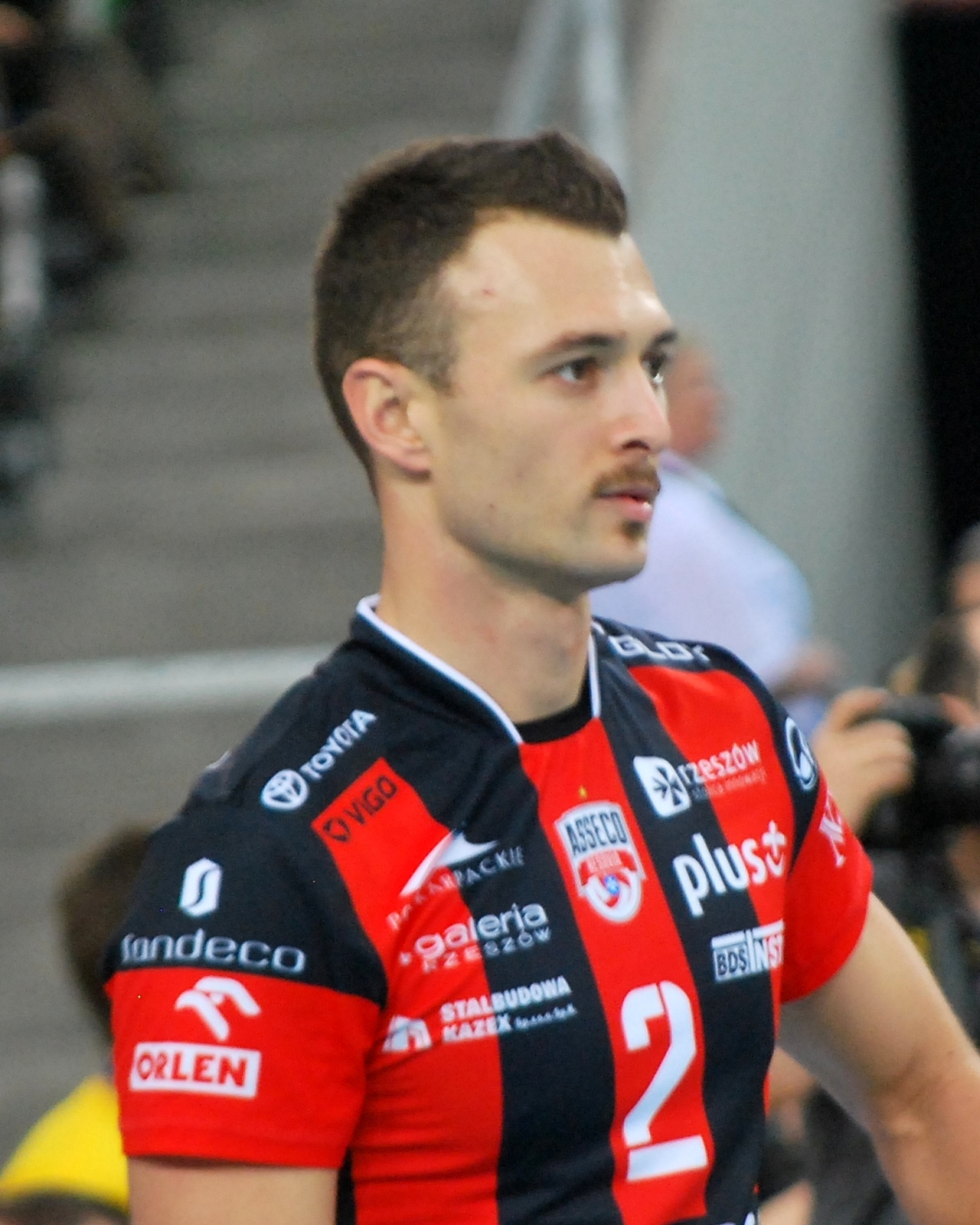

Personal information
- Full name: Paul Michael Lotman
- Born: November 3, 1985 (age 40); Lakewood, California, U.S.
- Height: 6 ft 7 in (2.00 m)
- Education: Long Beach State University

Volleyball information
- Position: Outside hitter

Career
Years	Teams
2004–2008; 2008; 2008–2009; 2009–2010; 2010–2011; 2011–2015; 2015–2016; 2017–2018; 2018–2019	Long Beach State Beach; Plataneros de Corozal; PAOK Thessaloniki; Stade Poitevin Poitiers; Marmi Lanza Verona; Asseco Resovia; Berlin Recycling Volleys; Jakarta BNI Taplus; Calicut Heroes

National team
2008–2022	United States
Medal record
Representing United States
Men's volleyball
FIVB World Cup
Gold medal – first place	2015 Japan
FIVB World League
Gold medal – first place	2014 Florence
Bronze medal – third place	2015 Rio de Janeiro
Pan American Cup
Gold medal – first place	2008 Winnipeg
NORCECA Championship
Gold medal – first place	2013 Canada
Silver medal – second place	2009 Puerto Rico
Silver medal – second place	2011 Puerto Rico
Men's beach volleyball
World Tour
Bronze medal – third place	2022 Dubai

Paul Michael Lotman (born November 3, 1985) is an American former professional volleyball player. He was part of the U.S. national team, and a participant at the Olympic Games London 2012. The 2014 World League and the 2015 World Cup winner.

== Personal life ==
Lotman was born in Lakewood, California. His parents are Kathleen and Albert Lotman (his father died in 2011). He has two older brothers, Mark and Steven, and an older sister Shelley. Lotman attended Los Alamitos High School (1999–2003). He graduated from California State University, Long Beach (better known as Long Beach State) in 2008 with a degree in sociology. In August 2011 he married Jasmine. On December 20, 2016 his wife gave birth to their son Leif Albert Lotman.

== Career ==
=== Club ===
In 2011 he joined the Polish club Asseco Resovia Rzeszów. With the club from Rzeszów he won three titles of Polish Champion (2012, 2013, 2015), Polish SuperCup and the silver medal of CEV Cup 2012. On March 29, 2015 Asseco Resovia Rzeszów, including Lotman, achieved silver medal of the 2014–15 CEV Champions League. He left Asseco Resovia in May 2015. In June 2015 he moved to German team Berlin Recycling Volleys. In 2017 he moved to Indonesian volleyball club Jakarta BNI Taplus for 2017/2018 season.

=== National team ===
Lotman made his Olympic debut with the U.S. national team in 2012 Olympics in London.

=== Coaching ===
In 2019, Lotman began working as a volunteer assistant coach with the UC San Diego Tritons men's volleyball team.

== Honors ==
=== Club ===
- CEV Champions League
  - 2014–15 – with Asseco Resovia
- CEV Cup
  - 2011–12 – with Asseco Resovia
  - 2015–16 – with Berlin Recycling Volleys
- Domestic
  - 2007–08 Puerto Rican Championship, with Plataneros de Corozal
  - 2011–12 Polish Championship, with Asseco Resovia
  - 2012–13 Polish Championship, with Asseco Resovia
  - 2013–14 Polish SuperCup, with Asseco Resovia
  - 2014–15 Polish Championship, with Asseco Resovia
  - 2015–16 German Cup, with Berlin Recycling Volleys
  - 2015–16 German Championship, with Berlin Recycling Volleys

=== Individual awards ===
- 2016: CEV Cup – Most valuable player
