= Novica Bjelica =

Serbian volleyball player (born 1983)

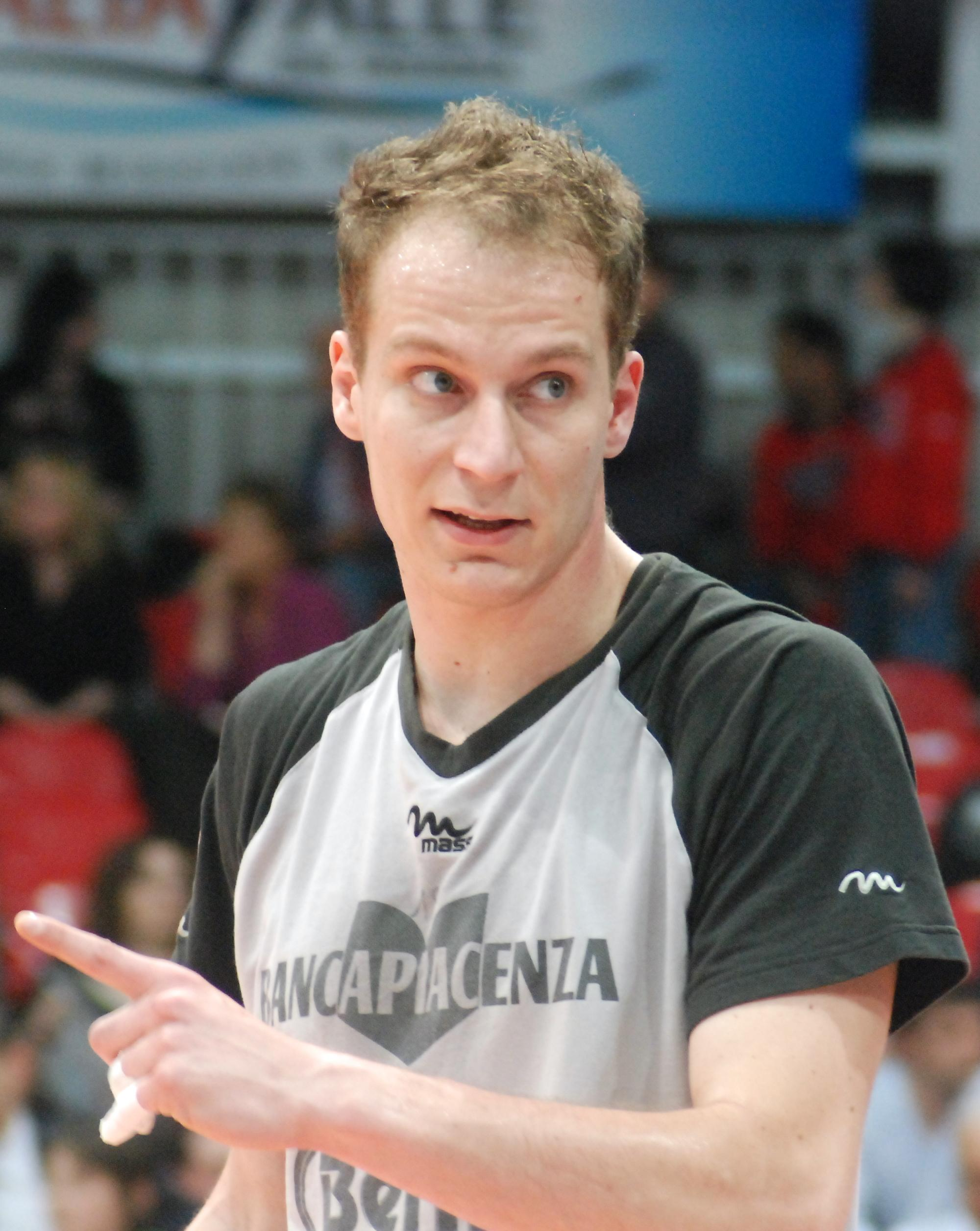

Personal information
- Born: 9 February 1983 (age 43); Pula, SR Croatia, SFR Yugoslavia
- Height: 2.02 m (6 ft 8 in)
- Weight: 86 kg (190 lb)
- Spike: 343 cm (135 in)
- Block: 324 cm (128 in)

Volleyball information
- Position: Middle blocker
- Current club: Partizan Belgrade
- Number: 18

Career
Years	Teams
2000–2003; 2003–2004; 2004–2007; 2007–2010; 2010–2011; 2011–2012; 2012–2013; 2013–2014; 2014–2015; 2015; 2015–2018; 2018–2019; 2020; 2021–2024; 2024–2026; 2026–	Crvena zvezda Belgrade; Budućnost Podgorica; Maggiora Latina; Copra Piacenza; Sisley Treviso; Roma Volley; Fenerbahçe Istanbul; Minas Tênis Clube; Budvanska Rivijera Budva; El Jaish; Stade Poitevin Poitiers; Ahmedabad Defenders; PAOK Thessaloniki; Partizan Belgrade; Jedinstvo Stara Pazova; Partizan Belgrade

National team
Serbia and Montenegro; Serbia
Honours
Men's volleyball
Representing Serbia and Montenegro
European Championship
Bronze medal – third place	2005 Serbia and Montenegro/Italy
World Cup
Bronze medal – third place	2003 Japan
World League
Bronze medal – third place	2004 Rome
Mediterranean Games
Bronze medal – third place	2005 Almería	Team
Representing Serbia
World League
Silver medal – second place	2009 Belgrade
- Last updated: 13 February 2017

Novica Bjelica (Serbian: Новица Бјелица; born 9 February 1983) is a Serbian volleyball player, a member of Serbia men's national volleyball team and French club Stade Poitevin Poitiers, a participant of the 2008 Olympic Games, medalist of European Championship, World Cup and World League, 2009 Italian Champion, 2015 Montenegrin Champion.

== Career ==
He won several medals with the national team in international competitions. Novica represented his country at the 2008 Olympic Games. Serbian team was eliminated in the quarter finals of the Olympic tournament.

He won 2009 Italian Champion title with Copra Nordmeccanica Piacenza. Then he was a player of another Italian teams from Treviso and Rome. Bjelica played season 2012/13 in Turkish Fenerbahçe Istanbul. Season 2013/14 he spent in Brazilian league as Minas Tênis Clube player. Next season he played for Budvanska Rivijera Budva and he achieved title of 2015 Montenegrin Champion. In 2016 after short time in El Jaish, he signed contract with French club Stade Poitevin Poitiers.

== Sporting achievements ==
=== Clubs ===
==== CEV Champions League ====
- 2007/2008 – with Copra Nordmeccanica Piacenza

==== CEV Cup ====
- 2010/2011 – with Sisley Treviso

==== South American Club Championship ====
- Brazil 2014 – with Minas Tênis Clube

==== National championships ====
- 2007/2008 Italian Championship, with Copra Nordmeccanica Piacenza
- 2008/2009 Italian Championship, with Copra Nordmeccanica Piacenza
- 2009/2010 Italian SuperCup 2009, with Copra Nordmeccanica Piacenza
- 2012/2013 Turkish SuperCup 2012, with Fenerbahçe Istanbul
- 2014/2015 Montenegrin Championship, with Budvanska Rivijera Budva
- 2014/2015 Montenegrin Cup, with Budvanska Rivijera Budva
- 2021/2022 Serbian Cup, with Partizan Belgrade
- 2022/2023 Serbian Championship, with Partizan Belgrade
- 2022/2023 Serbian Cup, with Partizan Belgrade
- 2022/2023 Serbian SuperCup 2022, with Partizan Belgrade
- 2023/2024 Serbian Championship, with Partizan Belgrade
- 2023/2024 Serbian SuperCup 2023, with Partizan Belgrade
