= Kolkata Thunderbolts =

Indian volleyball team

- Founded: 2021; 5 years ago
- Owner: Kolkata Sports Ventures
- Chairman: Pawan Kumar Patodia
- Manager: Narayan Alva
- Captain: Ashwal Rai
- League: Prime Volleyball League
- 2022: (gold) Champions

Uniforms
Home	Away

Kolkata Thunderbolts is a men's volleyball team from Kolkata, West Bengal playing in the Prime Volleyball League in India. The team was founded in 2021 and owned by Kolkata Sports Ventures. They won the inaugural, 2022 PVL season by defeating Ahmedabad Defenders 3-0 in the final.

== Honors ==
- Prime Volleyball League

Winners (1): 2022

== Team ==
Team roster 2024
No.	Name	Position
	(Turkey) Onur Cukur	Setter
	(India) Vinayak Rokhade	Setter
	(India) Hari Prasad	Libero
	(India) Arjun Nath	Blocker
	(India) Ashwal Rai	Blocker
	(India) Deepesh Sinha	Blocker
	(India) Praful S	Blocker
	(India) Sudheer Shetty	Blocker
	(India) Amit Chokker	Attacker
	(Poland) David Kisiel	Attacker
	(India) Deepak Kumar	Attacker
	(India) Prabagaran	Attacker
	(India) Rahul K	Attacker
	(India) Rakesh Kumar	Attacker
	(India) Vinit Kumar	Attacker

== Administration and support staff ==
Position	Name
Owner	(India) Kolkata Sports Ventures
Chairman	(India) Pawan Kumar Patodia
Co-Owner	(India) Vinay Kishan
Co-Owner	(India) Vineet Bhandari
Team director	(India) Sumedh Patodia
Head coach	Rahman Mohammadrad
Assistant coach	Davoud Mogbehli
Team manager	(India) Vaibhav Choudhary
Senior manager	(India) Nayan Kumar
Physio	(India) Dr. Utkarsh Kulshreshtha
