= Kochi Blue Spikers =

Indian volleyball team

- Founded: 2018; 8 years ago
- Owner: Thomas Muthoot
- Manager: M. H. Kumara
- Captain: Karthik A.
- League: Prime Volleyball League
- 2022: 7th place

Uniforms
Home	Away

Kochi Blue Spikers, commonly known as KBS, is a men's volleyball team from Kochi, Kerala playing in the Prime Volleyball League in India. The team was founded in 2018 and owned by Muthoot Pappachan Group. The team had participated in the only season of the dissolved Pro Volleyball League in 2019 before it switched to Prime Volleyball League in 2021.

== Honors ==
- Pro Volleyball League

Third Place: 2019

== History ==
=== 2019 season ===
In mid-2018, Volleyball Federation of India along with Baseline Ventures, India invited bids for franchisees based in Indian cities for Pro Volleyball League. The league was given the go-ahead by FIVB. Thomas Muthoot of the Muthoot Pappachan Group won the bid for the Kochi franchisee in the Pro Volleyball League

Blue Spikers picked India international Prabagaran as their icon player for 1.20 million rupees. They also secured the services of India Captain, Mohan Ukkrapandian. USA international David Lee, who has won both the Olympic Gold medal and the World cup was their foreign pick. Lee expressed his thrill to join Kochi and expected that the league will do a world of good to the players and its fans.

Logo used from 2018 to 2022

== Team ==
Team roster 2024
No.	Name	Position
	(India) Jithin Neelathazha	Setter
	(India) Lad Om Vasanth	Setter
	(India) Ayush Pandey	Libero
	(India) Ratheesh C K	Libero
	(India) Abhinav BS	Blocker
	(Brazil) Athos Costa	Blocker
	(India) Digvijay Singh	Blocker
	(India) Sachin K	Blocker
	(India) Aman Kumar	Attacker
	(India) Erin Varghese	Attacker
	(India) George Antony	Attacker
	(Poland) Jan Krol	Attacker
	(India) Jibin Sebastian	Attacker
	(India) Vishal Krishna	Attacker

== Administration and support staff ==
Position	Name
Owner	(India) M Liga Sports
Head coach	(Serbia) Vulicevic Dejan
Assistant coach	(India) Boby Xavier
