= David Lee (volleyball) =

American volleyball player (born 1982)

- Lee in 2015

Personal information
- Full name: David Cameron Lee
- Born: March 8, 1982 (age 44); Alpine, California, U.S.
- Height: 6 ft 8 in (2.03 m)
- Weight: 231 lb (105 kg)
- Spike: 140 in (350 cm)
- Block: 128 in (325 cm)
- Education: Long Beach State

Coaching information
Previous teams coached
| Years | Teams |
|---|---|
| 2025–present | Bogor LavAni (Head coach) |

Volleyball information
- Position: Middle blocker
- Current club: Bogor LavAni

Career
| Years | Teams |
|---|---|
| 2001–2004; 2004; 2004–2005; 2005; 2005–2006; 2006–2008; 2008–2009; 2009–2010; 2010–2011; 2011–2012; 2012; 2012–2013; 2013–2014; 2014–2015; 2016; 2016–2017; 2017–2018; 2018; 2019; 2019–2022 | Long Beach State 49ers Caribes de San Sebastián; Castelo da Maia; Jakarta BNI 46; Rennes Volley 35; Halkbank Ankara; Trenkwalder Modena; Lokomotiv Novosibirsk; VC Dynamo Moscow; VC Kuzbass Kemerovo; Al Rayyan; VC Zenit Kazan; Fudan University Shanghai; Lokomotiv Novosibirsk; PAOK Thessaloniki; Ziraat Bankası Ankara; Orange County Stunners; UPCN Vóley Club; Kochi Blue Spikers; Calicut Heroes |

National team
| 2003–2016 | United States |
Medal record
Olympic Games
| Gold medal – first place | 2008 Beijing | Team |
| Bronze medal – third place | 2016 Rio de Janeiro | Team |
World Cup
| Gold medal – first place | 2015 Japan |
World League
| Gold medal – first place | 2008 Rio de Janeiro |
| Gold medal – first place | 2014 Florence |
| Bronze medal – third place | 2007 Katowice |
| Bronze medal – third place | 2015 Rio de Janeiro |
NORCECA Championship
| Gold medal – first place | 2007 Anaheim |
| Gold medal – first place | 2013 Langley |
| Silver medal – second place | 2009 Bayamón |
| Silver medal – second place | 2011 Mayaguez |
Pan American Games
| Silver medal – second place | 2007 Rio de Janeiro | Team |
NORCECA Champions Cup
| Silver medal – second place | 2015 Detroit |
- Last updated: April 28, 2021

David Cameron Lee (born March 8, 1982) is an American volleyball player, currently working as the head coach for the Indonesian Club, Bogor LavAni. As a member of the United States men's national volleyball team, he is an Olympic Champion at the 2008 Summer Olympics, an Olympic bronze medalist at the 2016 Summer Olympics, and a three-time Olympian (2008, 2012, 2016). He is also a two-time NORCECA Champion (2007, 2013), a gold medalist at the 2015 World Cup, and a gold medalist of the World League (2008, 2014).

== Early life ==
Lee was born in Alpine, California. He attended Granite Hills High School in El Cajon, California, where he graduated in 2000.

== College ==
As a junior at Long Beach State in 2003, he was named to the All-Mountain Pacific Sports Federation (MPSF) second team and led the conference with a .483 hitting percentage. As a senior in 2004, he was named an American Volleyball Coaches Association (AVCA) First Team All-American. He helped Long Beach State to the 2004 NCAA championship match, where they lost to BYU in the longest championship match in NCAA men's volleyball history. Long Beach State held two championship points, but did not convert and lost 3-2, 19–17 in the fifth game.

== International ==
=== Professional ===
Lee has played professionally in Greece, Russia, Italy, France, Puerto Rico, Portugal and Indonesia. He has won national championships in Indonesia and Greece.

For the 2015–16 season, he was playing for P.A.O.K. V.C. in Thessaloniki Greece.

=== U.S. national team ===
Lee joined the U.S. national team in 2005. He became a part-time starter in 2007, splitting time with Tom Hoff and finishing the season second on the team in blocks. Lee was the team's second-leading blocker and third overall at the 2007 World Cup, where the U.S. finished fourth.

==== Olympics ====
Lee made his Olympic debut with the U.S. national team in 2008 in Beijing, China, helping Team USA win the gold medal. He competed at the 2012 Summer Olympics in London and finished in 5th place with the U.S. team. He went on to compete at his third Olympics in 2016 in Rio, and won the bronze medal with his U.S. teammates.

== Awards ==
=== Clubs ===
- 2011–12 CEV Men's Cup – Champion, with Dynamo Moscow
- 2015–16 Greek Volleyball League – Champion, with P.A.O.K. V.C.
- 2017–18 Liga de Voleibol Argentina – Champion, with UPCN Vóley

=== National team ===
==== Senior team ====
- 2005 America's Cup, Gold medal
- 2005 NORCECA Championship, Gold medal
- 2007 FIVB World League, Bronze medal
- 2007 NORCECA Championship, Gold medal
- 2008 FIVB World League, Gold medal
- 2008 Summer Olympics, Gold medal
- 2009 NORCECA Championship, Silver medal
- 2011 NORCECA Championship, Silver medal
- 2013 NORCECA Championship, Gold medal
- 2015 FIVB World League
- 2015 FIVB World Cup
- 2016 Olympic Games

=== Individual ===
- 2011 NORCECA Volleyball Championship "Best Blocker"
- 2014 World League "Best Middle Blocker"

Awards
| Preceded by (Russia) Nikolay Apalikov | Best Blocker of CEV Champions League; 2012/2013 | Succeeded by (Russia) Dmitriy Muserskiy |
| Preceded by (Russia) Dmitriy Muserskiy (Italy) Emanuele Birarelli | Best Middle Blocker of FIVB World League; 2014 ex aequo (Brazil) Lucas Saatkamp | Succeeded by (United States) Maxwell Holt (Serbia) Srećko Lisinac |
