= Chennai Blitz =

Indian volleyball team

- Founded: 2021; 5 years ago
- Owner: SPP Group
- Manager: Sabari Rajan
- Captain: Mohan Ukkrapandian
- League: Prime Volleyball League
- 2022: 6th place

Uniforms
Home	Away

Chennai Blitz is a men's volleyball team from Chennai, Tamil Nadu playing in the Prime Volleyball League in India. The team was founded in 2021 and owned by SPP Group.

== Team ==
Team roster 2024
No.	Name	Position
	(India) Abdul Chisti	Universal
	(India) Dhilip Kumar	Universal
	(India) Jobin Varughese	Universal
	(India) Paras	Universal
	(India) Sameer	Setter
	(India) Surya Nanjil	Setter
	(India) Prabakaran	Libero
	(India) Ramanathan Ramamoorthy	Libero
	(India) Akhin GS	Blocker
	(Colombia) Leandro Jose	Blocker
	(India) Sayanth T	Blocker
	(Brazil) Douglas Bueno	Attacker
	(India) Himanshu Tyagi	Attacker
	(India) Joel Benjamin	Attacker
	(India) Raman Kumar	Attacker

== Administration and support staff ==
Position	Name		
Owner	SPP Group		
Head coach	(India) Dakshinamoorthy	Assistant coach	(India) Kamaraj & (India) Shaik Ismail Jabeebullah
Team Manager	(India) Sabari Rajan		
