= Carson Clark =

American volleyball player (born 1989)

Personal information
- Nationality: American
- Born: January 20, 1989 (age 37)
- Height: 6 ft 9 in (2.05 m)
- Weight: 205 lb (93 kg)
- Spike: 144 in (365 cm)
- Block: 142 in (360 cm)

Volleyball information
- Number: 15

Career
Years	Teams
2012-13; 2013-14; 2014-15; 2019	(France) Montpellier (Poland) Transfer Bydgoszcz (Greece) Olympiacos (India) Black Hawks Hyderabad

National team
2010-2017	United States
Medal record
NORCECA Championship
Gold medal – first place	2013 Canada
Gold medal – first place	2017 United States

Carson Clark (born January 20, 1989) is an American male volleyball player. He was part of the United States men's national volleyball team at the 2014 FIVB Volleyball Men's World Championship in Poland. He won two NCAA National Championships (2009, 2012) while studying for a degree in sociology at UC Irvine. and two golds at the Pan American Cup (2010, 2012) making his international debut in 2010 against the Dominican Republic. He played for Montpellier, Olympiacos, Transfer Bydgoszcz, and Black Hawks Hyderabad.

== Clubs ==
- Montpellier Volley U.C. (2012–13)
- Transfer Bydgoszcz (2013–14)
- Olympiacos (2014–15)
- Black Hawks Hyderabad (2019-)
