= Calicut Heroes =

Indian volleyball team

- Founded: 2018; 7 years ago
- Owner: Beacon Sports
- Head coach: Sunny Joseph
- League: Prime Volleyball League
- 2024: Champions

Uniforms
Home	Away

Calicut Heroes is a men's volleyball team from Kozhikode, Kerala playing in the Prime Volleyball League in India. The team was founded in 2018 and owned by Beacon Sports. The team had participated in the only season of the dissolved Pro Volleyball League in 2019 before it switched to Prime Volleyball League in 2021.

== Honours ==
=== Domestic ===
- Prime Volleyball League
  - Champions: 2024
  - Fourth Place: 2022
- Pro Volleyball League
  - Runners-up: 2019

=== Continental ===
- CAVA Club Volleyball Championship
  - Champions (1): 2024

== History ==
=== 2019 season ===
In mid-2018, Baseline Ventures, India invited bids for franchisees based in Indian cities for Pro Volleyball League. The league was given the go-ahead by Fédération Internationale de Volleyball. Beacon Sports won the bid for the Calicut franchisee in the Pro Volleyball League. The Calicut Heroes team was captained by Jerome Vinith and coached by Sajad Hussain Malik in the Pro Volleyball League.

== Team ==
Team roster 2025
No.	Name	Position
0	(India) Vikas Maan	Blocker
0	(India) Ashok Bishnoi	universal
0	(India) Mohan Ukkrapandian	Setter
0	(India) Santhosh	Attacker
0	(India) Shamsudheen	Blocker
0	(India) Abdul Raheem	Universal
0	(India) Mukesh Kumar	Libero
0	(India) Usama	Attacker
0	(India) Kiran Raj	Attacker
0	(India) Haris	Setter
0	(India) Sivanesan	Blocker
0	(India) Adarsh	Libero
0	(Sri Lanka) Tharusha Chamath Dilshan	Hitter
0	(Benin) Bosco Dete	Hitter

== Administration and support staff ==
Position	Name
Owner	Beacon Sports
Head coach	(India) Sunny Joseph
Assistant coach	(India) Ahamed Faiz
Strength and Conditioning coach	(India) Hemanth

== League results ==
Champion Runner-up

League	Season	Position	Teams	Matches	Win	Lose
Prime Volleyball League
Prime Volleyball League	2019	Runner-up	6	7	6	1
Prime Volleyball League	2022	Fourth	7	7	4	3
Prime Volleyball League	2023	Third	8	8	4	4
Prime Volleyball League	2024	Champions	9	13	9	4
