= Mohan Ukkrapandian =

Indian volleyball player (born 1986)

Ukkrapandian
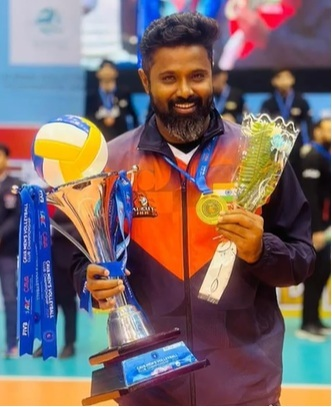

Personal information
- Full name: Mohan Ukkrapandian
- Born: 15 May 1986 (age 40)
- Height: 192 cm (6 ft 4 in)
- Weight: 92 kg (203 lb)
- Spike: 335 cm (132 in)
- Block: 312 cm (123 in)

Volleyball information
- Position: Setter

Career
Years	Teams
2005–Present	(India) Indian Overseas Bank
2005-Present	(India) Tamil Nadu
2021	(India) Chennai Blitz
2022-Present	(India) Calicut Heroes

National team
India

Mohan Ukkrapandian (born 15 May 1986) is an India men's national volleyball team player.

Tamilan Widely considered the Indian setter Mohan Ukkrapandian is an Indian professional volleyball player, One of the finest setter in Asia, represented India in many big stages like Asian Games, South Asian Games, Asia Cup, Asia Club championship Who is currently a member of Indian Men's National volleyball team and Leading the domestic clubs they are

Calicut Heroes in Prime volleyball league

Chennai rockstar in TNVL

also working and leading the Indian Overseas Bank volleyball Team.

== Early life ==
Ukkrapandian was born on 15 May 1986, is from Pudupatti, Tamil Nadu.

== Career ==
He is also a member of Tamil Nadu volleyball team. Because of his national level recognition, he was rewarded with a job in Indian Overseas Bank.
