= Ahmedabad Defenders =

Indian volleyball team

- Founded: 2018; 8 years ago
- Ground: Various
- Owner: Bonhomie Sports
- Head coach: (Serbia) Dragan Mihailovic
- Captain: (India) Muthusamy Appavu
- League: Prime Volleyball League
- 2023: (gold) Champions

Uniforms
Home	Away

Ahmedabad Defenders is a men's volleyball team from Ahmedabad, Gujarat playing in the Prime Volleyball League in India. The team was founded in 2018 and owned by Bonhomie Sports. The team had participated in the only season of the dissolved Pro Volleyball League, before it switched to Prime Volleyball League in 2021.

== Honors ==
=== Domestic ===
- Prime Volleyball League

Winners (1): 2023
Runners-up (1): 2022

== Team ==
Team roster 2024
No.	Name	Position
1	(India) Raunak kuthe	Universal
2	(India) Tamilvanan Srikanth	Libero
3	(India) T. Ragul	Attacker
4	(India) Aswath Pandiyaraj	Setter
6	(Australia) Max Senica	Attacker
7	(India) Shon John	Attacker
9	(India) Santhosh S.	Attacker
10	(India) Nandhagopal Subramaniam	Attacker
11	(India) Parth Patel	Blocker
13	(India) Harsh Chaudhary	Universal
14	(India) L. M. Manoj	Blocker
16	(India) Muthusamy Appavu (C)	Setter
18	(India) T. N. Muhammed Iqbal	Blocker
20	(Belarus) Ilya Burau	Blocker

== Administration and support staff ==
Position	Name
Owner	Bonhomie Sports
Head coach	(Serbia) Dragan Mihailovic
Assistant coach	(India) Sajad Hussain Malik
Team manager	(India) Siddarth Sabapathy

== League results ==
Champion Runner-up

League		Position	Teams	Matches	Win	Lose
Pro Volleyball League	2019	6th	6	5	0	5
Prime Volleyball League
Prime Volleyball League	2022	Runner-up	7	8	6	2
Prime Volleyball League	2023	Champion	8	9	7	2
