= 2017 BWF World Senior Championships – 65+ =

Tournament details
- Dates: 11 September 2017 – 17 September 2017
- Edition: 9
- Level: International
- Nations: 18
- Venue: Rajiv Gandhi Indoor Stadium
- Location: Kochi, India

Champions
- Men's singles: (South Africa) Johan Croukamp
- Women's singles: (England) Betty Bartlett
- Men's doubles: (England) Peter Emptage (England) Graham Holt
- Women's doubles: (England) Betty Bartlett (England) Eileen M. Carley
- Mixed doubles: (Canada) Henry Paynter (Canada) Siew Har Hong

These are the results of 2017 BWF World Senior Championships' 65+ events.

== Men's singles ==
=== Seeds ===
1. (South Africa) Johan Croukamp (champion, gold medal)
2. (Canada) Henry Paynter (final, silver medal)
3. (Denmark) Per Dabelsteen (quarterfinals)
4. (Finland) Carl-Johan Nybergh (semifinals, bronze medal)
5. (England) Peter Emptage (first round)
6. (India) Hubert Miranda (semifinals, bronze medal)
7. (Japan) Hirohisa Toshijima (second round)
8. (Denmark) Christian Hansen (quarterfinals)

=== Finals ===
Semifinals
1	(South Africa) Johan Croukamp	21	21
6	(India) Hubert Miranda	18	15
4	(Finland) Carl-Johan Nybergh	10	21	20
2	(Canada) Henry Paynter	21	17	22

Final
1	(South Africa) Johan Croukamp	21	21
2	(Canada) Henry Paynter	15	11

=== Top half ===
==== Section 1 ====
First Round
1	(South Africa) J Croukamp	21	21
(Russia) A Buzynin	3	7
(France) J-L Gilbert	14	21	11
(Switzerland) W Rahm	21	18	21
5	(England) P Emptage	19	14
(India) S Gupta	21	21
(Germany) C-P Lienig	11	18
(Malaysia) Ong S O	21	21

Second Round
1	(South Africa) J Croukamp	21	21
(Switzerland) W Rahm	5	7
(India) S Gupta	21	21
(Malaysia) Ong S O	12	18

Quarterfinals
1	(South Africa) J Croukamp	21	21
(India) S Gupta	13	14

==== Section 2 ====
First Round
3	(Denmark) P Dabelsteen	21	21
(Canada) W Metcalfe	15	10
(England) G Holt	21	21
(Australia) A Lourdes	19	10
6	(India) H Miranda	21	21
(Japan) N Imai	14	12
(Germany) E Peschel	21	21
(Thailand) C Thongdejsri	14	13

Second Round
3	(Denmark) P Dabelsteen	21	21
(England) G Holt	17	12
6	(India) H Miranda	21	21
(Germany) E Peschel	10	7

Quarterfinals
3	(Denmark) P Dabelsteen	22	14	13
6	(India) H Miranda	20	21	21

=== Bottom half ===
==== Section 3 ====
First Round
(India) P Samadhanam	21	17	21
(Japan) N Nakamura	17	21	12
(Russia) V Orlov	9	7
8	(Denmark) C Hansen	21	21
(England) D Brinsden	13	15
(Germany) H-W Schmitz	21	21
(Uzbekistan) V Ribkin	24	6
4	(Finland) C-J Nybergh	26	21

Second Round
(India) P Samadhanam	21	21	18
8	(Denmark) C Hansen	17	23	21
(Germany) H-W Schmitz	19	14
4	(Finland) C-J Nybergh	21	21

Quarterfinals
8	(Denmark) C Hansen	19	17
4	(Finland) C-J Nybergh	21	21

==== Section 4 ====
First Round
(Sri Lanka) F Mainaky	21	21
(England) A Perera	6	4
(India) Zokima F.	15	7
7	(Japan) H Toshijima	21	21
(Germany) J Biehler	21	21
(Malaysia) I S Abdullah	12	15
(Denmark) H Skydsgaard	8	10
2	(Canada) H Paynter	21	21

Second Round
(Sri Lanka) F Mainaky	22	21
7	(Japan) H Toshijima	20	18
(Germany) J Biehler	14	10
2	(Canada) H Paynter	21	21

Quarterfinals
(Sri Lanka) F Mainaky	12	17
2	(Canada) H Paynter	21	21

== Women's singles ==
=== Seeds ===
1. (Japan) Yuriko Okemoto (semifinals, bronze medal)
2. (Canada) Siew Har Hong (final, silver medal)

=== Group A ===
Rank	Player	Pts	Pld	W	L	SF	SA	PF	PA
1	(Japan) Yuriko Okemoto	1	1	1	0	2	0	42	26
2	(France) Michele Bontemps	0	1	0	1	0	2	26	42
	(India) Mehrunnisa Bhaiji	Retired							

Date		Score		Set 1	Set 2	Set 3
11 Sep; 10:00	Yuriko Okemoto (Japan)	2–0	(France) Michele Bontemps	21–12	21–14	
12 Sep; 12:30	Mehrunnisa Bhaiji (India)	0–2	(France) Michele Bontemps	~~4–21~~	~~1–21~~	
13 Sep; 10:00	Yuriko Okemoto (Japan)	w/o	(India) Mehrunnisa Bhaiji			

=== Group B ===
Rank	Player	Pts	Pld	W	L	SF	SA	PF	PA
1	(Japan) Chizuko Oketani	3	3	3	0	6	1	144	55
2	(England) Marguerite Butt	2	3	2	1	5	2	125	71
3	(Sri Lanka) Rohini Jaywardena	1	3	1	2	2	4	58	95
4	(India) Vidya Sandipani Walhekar	0	3	0	3	0	6	20	126

Date		Score		Set 1	Set 2	Set 3
11 Sep; 10:00	Vidya Sandipani Walhekar (India)	0–2	(England) Marguerite Butt	1–21	3–21	
11 Sep; 10:00	Chizuko Oketani (Japan)	2–0	(Sri Lanka) Rohini Jaywardena	21–3	21–6	
12 Sep; 12:30	Chizuko Oketani (Japan)	2–1	(England) Marguerite Butt	21–9	18–21	21–11
12 Sep; 12:30	Vidya Sandipani Walhekar (India)	0–2	(Sri Lanka) Rohini Jaywardena	5–21	6–21	
13 Sep; 10:00	Chizuko Oketani (Japan)	2–0	(India) Vidya Sandipani Walhekar	21–2	21–3	
13 Sep; 10:00	Marguerite Butt (England)	2–0	(Sri Lanka) Rohini Jaywardena	21–4	21–3	

=== Group C ===
Rank	Player	Pts	Pld	W	L	SF	SA	PF	PA
1	(England) Betty Barlett	3	3	3	0	6	0	126	61
2	(Japan) Hiromi Mitsunaka	2	3	2	1	4	2	108	98
3	(Spain) Dolores Touriño	1	3	1	2	2	5	100	142
4	(India) Minoti Anand	0	3	0	3	1	6	108	141

Date		Score		Set 1	Set 2	Set 3
11 Sep; 10:00	Minoti Anand (India)	0–2	(England) Betty Bartlett	12–21	15–21	
11 Sep; 10:00	Hiromi Mitsunaka (Japan)	2–0	(Spain) Dolores Touriño	23–21	21–10	
12 Sep; 12:30	Hiromi Mitsunaka (Japan)	0–2	(England) Betty Bartlett	16–21	6–21	
12 Sep; 12:30	Minoti Anand (India)	1–2	(Spain) Dolores Touriño	19–21	21–15	16–21
13 Sep; 10:00	Hiromi Mitsunaka (Japan)	2–0	(India) Minoti Anand	21–15	21–10	
13 Sep; 10:00	Betty Bartlett (England)	2–0	(Spain) Dolores Touriño	21–10	21–2	

=== Group D ===
Rank	Player	Pts	Pld	W	L	SF	SA	PF	PA
1	(Canada) Siew Har Hong	3	3	3	0	6	1	144	105
2	(Japan) Yasuko Kataito	2	3	2	1	4	3	133	98
3	(Sweden) Lieselotte Wengberg	1	3	1	2	4	4	137	137
4	(India) Sunita Dsouza	0	3	0	3	0	6	52	126

Date		Score		Set 1	Set 2	Set 3
11 Sep; 10:00	Yasuko Kataito (Japan)	2–0	(India) Sunita Dsouza	21–7	21–4	
11 Sep; 10:00	Siew Har Hong (Canada)	2–1	(Sweden) Lieselotte Wengberg	18–21	21–12	21–17
12 Sep; 12:30	Siew Har Hong (Canada)	2–0	(India) Sunita Dsouza	21–10	21–12	
12 Sep; 12:30	Yasuko Kataito (Japan)	2–1	(Sweden) Liselotte Wengberg	21–12	16–21	21–12
13 Sep; 10:00	Siew Har Hong (Canada)	2–0	(Japan) Yasuko Kataito	21–16	21–17	
13 Sep; 10:00	Sunita Dsouza (India)	0–2	(Sweden) Lieselotte Wengberg	14–21	5–21	

=== Finals ===
Quarterfinals
A1	(Japan) Yuriko Okemoto	21	15	21
B2	(England) Marguerite Butt	17	21	12
C1	(England) Betty Barlett	17	26	21
D2	(Japan) Yasuko Kataito	21	24	13
A2	(France) Michele Bontemps	9	14
B1	(Japan) Chizuko Oketani	21	21
C2	(Japan) Hiromi Mitsunaka	13	13
D1	(Canada) Siew Har Hong	21	21

Semifinals
A1	(Japan) Yuriko Okemoto	11	16
C1	(England) Betty Barlett	21	21
B1	(Japan) Chizuko Oketani	18	17
D1	(Canada) Siew Har Hong	21	21

Final
C1	(England) Betty Barlett	21	21
D1	(Canada) Siew Har Hong	16	15

== Men's doubles ==
=== Seeds ===
1. (Denmark) Per Dabelsteen / Steen Adam Kioerbo (quarterfinals)
2. (England) Peter Emptage / Graham Holt (champions, gold medal)
3. (South Africa) Johan Croukamp / (Finland) Carl-Johan Nybergh (semifinals, bronze medal)
4. (India) Sushil Kumar Patet / Surendra Singh Pundir (semifinals, bronze medal)

=== Finals ===
Semifinals
(Thailand) Somrak Arnamwat (Thailand) Chaiwat Hanthanom	21	21
4	(India) Sushil Kumar Patet (India) Surendra Singh Pundir	14	10
3	(South Africa) Johan Croukamp (Finland) Carl-Johan Nybergh	13	19
2	(England) Peter Emptage (England) Graham Holt	21	21

Final
(Thailand) Somrak Arnamwat (Thailand) Chaiwat Hanthanom	15	14
2	(England) Peter Emptage (England) Graham Holt	21	21

=== Top half ===
==== Section 1 ====
First Round
(Thailand) S Arnamwat (Thailand) C Hanthanom	21	21
(Germany) J Biehler (Germany) E Peschel	10	16

Second Round
1	(Denmark) P Dabelsteen (Denmark) S A Kioerbo	21	21
(India) V Krishnamoorthy (India) P Malagoppa Somashekarappa	16	18
(Malaysia) I S Abdullah (Malaysia) V Menon	4	5
(Thailand) S Arnamwat (Thailand) C Hanthanom	21	21

Quarterfinals
1	(Denmark) P Dabelsteen (Denmark) S A Kioerbo	21	14	14
(Thailand) S Arnamwat (Thailand) C Hanthanom	17	21	21

==== Section 2 ====
First Round
(Thailand) B Jaiyen (Thailand) P Puangsupang	21	18	13
(Japan) N Imai (Japan) N Nakamura	18	21	21

Second Round
4	(India) S K Patet (India) S S Pundir	21	21
(England) D Chapman (Germany) H-W Schmitz	9	19
(Germany) G Roch (Germany) K Schaus	21	22
(Japan) N Imai (Japan) N Nakamura	18	20

Quarterfinals
4	(India) S K Patet (India) S S Pundir	20	21	21
(Germany) G Roch (Germany) K Schaus	22	12	11

=== Bottom half ===
==== Section 3 ====
First Round
(India) R Konduru (India) P Samadhanam	16	14
(Malaysia) Lee P C (Malaysia) Ong S O	21	21
(Thailand) S Chompoonuchprapa (Thailand) C Thongdejsri	21	21
(Germany) P Honnen (Germany) C-P Lienig	16	19

Second Round
(Malaysia) Lee P C (Malaysia) Ong S O	21	21
(France) J-L Gilbert (France) F Thomas	10	13
(Thailand) S Chompoonuchprapa (Thailand) C Thongdejsri	21	8	17
3	(South Africa) J Croukamp (Finland) C-J Nybergh	19	21	21

Quarterfinals
(Malaysia) Lee P C (Malaysia) Ong S O	21	8	16
3	(South Africa) J Croukamp (Finland) C-J Nybergh	12	21	21

==== Section 4 ====
First Round
(India) P M Mohamed Mytheen (India) S.R S P Sironmani	16	21	22
(Denmark) C Hansen (Denmark) H Skydsgaard	21	17	20

Second Round
(India) P M Mohamed Mytheen (India) S.R S P Sironmani	21	22
(Switzerland) W Rahm (Uzbekistan) V Ribkin	15	20
(Thailand) A Dejkraisak (Thailand) A Siwapornpitak	16	11
2	(England) P Emptage (England) G Holt	21	21

Quarterfinals
(India) P M Mohamed Mytheen (India) S.R S P Sironmani	11	8
2	(England) P Emptage (England) G Holt	21	21

== Women's doubles ==
=== Seeds ===
1. (England) Betty Bartlett / Eileen M. Carley (champions, gold medal)
2. (Japan) Sumiko Kaneko / Yuriko Okemoto (final, silver medal)

=== Group A ===
Rank	Player	Pts	Pld	W	L	SF	SA	PF	PA
1	(England) Betty Bartlett (England) Eileen M. Carley	2	3	2	1	5	3	153	123
2	(Japan) Haruko Asakoshi (Japan) Yasuko Kataito	2	3	2	1	5	2	133	116
3	(England) Marguerite Butt (Denmark) Thea Gyldenoehr	1	3	1	2	2	5	107	133
4	(Japan) Hiromi Mitsunaka (Japan) Chizuko Oketani	1	3	1	2	3	5	135	156
5	(India) Minoti Anand (India) Shaila Sardesai	Retired							

Date		Score		Set 1	Set 2	Set 3
11 Sep; 15:00	Haruko Asakoshi (Japan); Yasuko Kataito (Japan)	~~2–0~~	(India) Minoti Anand (India) Shaila Sardesai	~~21–9~~	~~21–6~~	
11 Sep; 15:00	Betty Bartlett (England); Eileen M. Carley (England)	2–0	(England) Marguerite Butt (Denmark) Thea Gyldenoehr	21–10	21–10	
12 Sep; 16:30	Hiromi Mitsunaka (Japan); Chizuko Oketani (Japan)	1–2	(England) Marguerite Butt (Denmark) Thea Gyldenoehr	21–16	14–21	14–21
12 Sep; 19:00	Betty Bartlett (England); Eileen M. Carley (England)	~~2–0~~	(India) Minoti Anand (India) Shaila Sardesai	~~21–10~~	~~21–11~~	
13 Sep; 15:35	Betty Bartlett (England); Eileen M. Carley (England)	1–2	(Japan) Hiromi Mitsunaka (Japan) Chizuko Oketani	15–21	21–11	20–22
13 Sep; 15:35	Haruko Asakoshi (Japan); Yasuko Kataito (Japan)	2–0	(England) Marguerite Butt (Denmark) Thea Gyldenoehr	21–17	21–12	
14 Sep; 17:45	Haruko Asakoshi (Japan); Yasuko Kataito (Japan)	2–0	(Japan) Hiromi Mitsunaka (Japan) Chizuko Oketani	21–19	21–13	
	Minoti Anand (India); Shaila Sardesai (India)	w/o	(England) Marguerite Butt (Denmark) Thra Gyldenoehr			
15 Sep; 17:20	Betty Bartlett (England); Eileen M. Carley (England)	2–1	(Japan) Haruko Asakoshi (Japan) Yasuko Kataito	13–21	21–16	21–12
	Hiromi Mitsunaka (Japan); Chizuko Oketani (Japan)	w/o	(India) Minoti Anand (India) Shaila Sardesai			

=== Group B ===
Rank	Player	Pts	Pld	W	L	SF	SA	PF	PA
1	(Japan) Sumiko Kaneko (Japan) Yuriko Okemoto	4	4	4	0	8	1	185	126
2	(Japan) Fumiko Sakuma (Japan) Masai Suzuki	3	4	3	1	7	2	185	123
3	(Denmark) Gitte Attle Rasmussen (Denmark) Grethe Steenberg	2	4	2	2	4	4	136	135
4	(France) Viviane Bonnay (France) Michele Bontemps	1	4	1	3	2	6	111	155
5	(India) Sunita Dsouza (India) Gowramma Veeralinga	0	4	0	4	0	8	92	170

Date		Score		Set 1	Set 2	Set 3
11 Sep; 17:30	Fumiko Sakuma (Japan); Masai Suzuki (Japan)	2–0	(France) Viviane Bonnay (France) Michele Bontemps	21–6	21–16	
11 Sep; 17:30	Sumiko Kaneko (Japan); Yuriko Okemoto (Japan)	2–0	(Denmark) Gitte Attle Rasmussen (Denmark) Gretthe Steenberg	21–11	21–16	
12 Sep; 16:30	Sunita Dsouza (India); Gowramma Veeralinga (India)	0–2	(Denmark) Gitte Attle Rasmussen (Denmark) Grethe Steenberg	11–21	14–21	
12 Sep; 19:00	Sumiko Kaneko (Japan); Yuriko Okemoto (Japan)	2–0	(France) Viviane Bonnay (France) Michele Bontemps	21–13	21–6	
13 Sep; 15:35	Fumiko Sakuma (Japan); Masai Suzuki (Japan)	2–0	(Denmark) Gitte Attle Rasmussen (Denmark) Grethe Steenberg	21–12	21–13	
13 Sep; 17:55	Sumiko Kaneko (Japan); Yuriko Okemoto (Japan)	2–0	(India) Sunita Dsouza (India) Gowramma Veeralinga	21–11	21–10	
14 Sep; 17:45	Fumiko Sakuma (Japan); Masai Suzuki (Japan)	2–0	(India) Sunita Dsouza (India) Gowramma Veeralinga	21–6	21–11	
14 Sep; 17:45	Viviane Bonnay (France); Michele Bontemps (France)	0–2	(Denmark) Gitte Attle Rasmussen (Denmark) Grethe Steenberg	15–21	11–21	
15 Sep; 17:20	Sumiko Kaneko (Japan); Yuriko Okemoto (Japan)	2–1	(Japan) Fumiko Sakuma (Japan) Masai Suzuki	21–18	16–21	22–20
15 Sep; 17:20	Sunita Dsouza (India); Gowramma Veeralinga (India)	0–2	(France) Viviane Bonnay (France) Michele Bontemps	21–23	8–21	

=== Finals ===
Semifinals
A1	(England) Betty Bartlett (England) Eileen M. Carley	21	21
B2	(Japan) Fumiko Sakuma (Japan) Masai Suzuki	15	15
A2	(Japan) Haruko Asakoshi (Japan) Yasuko Kataito	21	19	21
B1	(Japan) Sumiko Kaneko (Japan) Yuriko Okemoto	12	21	15

Final
A1	(England) Betty Bartlett (England) Eileen M. Carley	21	21
A2	(Japan) Haruko Asakoshi (Japan) Yasuko Kataito	10	16

== Mixed doubles ==
=== Seeds ===
1. (Denmark) Christian Hansen / Gitte Attle Rasmussen (final, silver medal)
2. (England) Peter Emptage / Betty Bartlett (semifinals, bronze medal)

=== Group A ===
Rank	Player	Pts	Pld	W	L	SF	SA	PF	PA
1	(Denmark) Christian Hansen (Denmark) Gitte Attle Rasmussen	2	2	2	0	4	0	84	34
2	(England) Graham Holt (England) Marguerite Butt	1	2	1	1	2	2	65	59
3	(India) Dinesh Patel (India) Mehrunnisa Bhaiji	0	2	0	2	0	4	28	84

Date		Score		Set 1	Set 2	Set 3
11 Sep; 12:30	Christian Hansen (Denmark); Gitte Attle Rasmussen (Denmark)	2–0	(England) Graham Holt (England) Marguerite Butt	21–12	21–11	
12 Sep; 10:00	Dinesh Patel (India); Mehrunnisa Bhaiji (India)	0–2	(England) Graham Holt (England) Marguerite Butt	9–21	8–21	
13 Sep; 12:55	Christian Hansen (Denmark); Gitte Attle Rasmussen (Denmark)	2–0	(India) Dinesh Patel (India) Mehrunnisa Bhaiji	21–7	21–4	

=== Group B ===
Rank	Player	Pts	Pld	W	L	SF	SA	PF	PA
1	(Canada) Henry Paynter (Canada) Siew Har Hong	3	3	3	0	6	1	140	90
2	(Japan) Hirohisa Toshijima (Japan) Yuriko Okemoto	2	3	2	1	4	2	110	96
3	(England) David Chapman (England) Eileen M. Carley	1	3	1	2	3	4	117	119
4	(India) Darayas Surti (India) Sunita Dandekar	0	3	0	3	0	6	64	126

Date		Score		Set 1	Set 2	Set 3
11 Sep; 12:30	David Chapman (England); Eileen M. Carley (England)	0–2	(Japan) Hirohisa Toshijima (Japan) Yuriko Okemoto	15–21	9–21	
11 Sep; 12:30	Darayas Surti (India); Sunita Dandekar (India)	0–2	(Canada) Henry Paynter (Canada) Siew Har Hong	7–21	6–21	
12 Sep; 10:00	Darayas Surti (India); Sunita Dandekar (India)	0–2	(Japan) Jirojisa Toshijima (Japan) Yuriko Okemoto	15–21	15–21	
12 Sep; 10:00	David Chapman (England); Eileen M. Carley (England)	1–2	(Canada) Henry Paynter (Canada) Siew Har Hong	21–14	13–21	17–21
13 Sep; 10:35	Darayas Surti (India); Sunita Dandekar (India)	0–2	(England) David Chapman (England) Eileen M. Carley	6–21	15–21	
13 Sep; 12:55	Hirohisa Toshijima (Japan); Yuriko Okemoto (Japan)	0–2	(Canada) Henry Paynter (Canada) Siew Har Hong	16–21	10–21	

=== Group C ===
Rank	Player	Pts	Pld	W	L	SF	SA	PF	PA
1	(Japan) Noboru Nakamura (Japan) Fusako Araki	3	3	3	0	6	1	147	113
2	(Denmark) Harry Skydsgaard (Denmark) Thra Gyldenoehr	2	3	2	1	4	3	139	135
3	(India) Surendra Singh Pundir (India) Sunita Dsouza	1	3	1	2	4	4	161	157
4	(France) Jean-Louis Gilbert (France) Viviane Bonnay	0	3	0	3	0	6	84	126

Date		Score		Set 1	Set 2	Set 3
11 Sep; 10:30	Noboru Nakamura (Japan); Fusako Araki (Japan)	2–0	(France) Jean-Louis Gilbert (France) Viviane Bonnay	21–12	21–12	
11 Sep; 12:30	Surendra Singh Pudir (India); Sunita Dsouza (India)	1–2	(Denmark) Harry Skydsgaard (Denmark) Thea Gyldenoehr	22–24	22–20	18–21
12 Sep; 10:00	Surendra Singh Pundir (India); Sunita Dsouza (India)	2–0	(France) Jean-Louis Gilbert (France) Viviane Bonnay	21–11	21–18	
12 Sep; 10:00	Noboru Nakamura (Japan); Fusako Araki (Japan)	2–0	(Denmark) Harry Skydsgaard (Denmark) Thea Gyldenoehr	21–17	21–15	
13 Sep; 10:35	Jean-Louis Gilbert (France); Viviane Bonnay (France)	0–2	(Denmark) Harry Skydsgaard (Denmark) Thea Gyldenoehr	16–21	15–21	
13 Sep; 12:55	Surendra Singh Pundir (India); Sunita Dsouza (India)	1–2	(Japan) Noboru Nakamura (Japan) Fusako Araki	23–21	17–21	17–21

=== Group D ===
Rank	Player	Pts	Pld	W	L	SF	SA	PF	PA
1	(England) Peter Emptage (England) Betty Bartlett	3	3	3	0	6	0	126	47
2	(Sri Lanka) Frirs Mainaky (Sri Lanka) Rohini Jaywardena	2	3	2	1	4	2	99	102
3	(Japan) Yoshio Terasaki (Japan) Yasuko Kataito	1	3	1	2	2	4	106	132
4	(India) Shirish Nadkarni (India) Minoti Anand	0	3	0	3	0	6	86	136

Date		Score		Set 1	Set 2	Set 3
11 Sep; 12:30	Shirish Nadkarni (India); Minoti Anand (India)	0–2	(Japan) Yoshio Terasaki (Japan) Yasuko Kataito	21–23	27–29	
11 Sep; 12:30	Peter Emptage (England); Betty Bartlett (England)	2–0	(Sri Lanka) Frirs Mainaky (Sri Lanka) Rohini Jaywardena	21–9	21–6	
12 Sep; 10:00	Peter Emptage (England); Batty Bartlett (England)	2–0	(Japan) Yoshio Terasaki (Japan) Yasuko Kataito	21–11	21–7	
12 Sep; 10:00	Shirish Nadkarni (India); Minoti Anand (India)	0–2	(Sri Lanka) Frirs Mainaky (Sri Lanka) Rohini Jaywardena	15–21	9–21	
13 Sep; 12:55	Peter Emptage (England); Betty Bartlett (England)	2–0	(India) Shirish Nadkarni (India) Minoti Anand	21–9	21–5	
13 Sep; 12:55	Yoshio Terasaki (Japan); Yasuko Kataito (Japan)	0–2	(Sri Lanka) Frirs Mainaky (Sri Lanka) Rohini Jaywardena	19–21	17–21	

=== Finals ===
Quarterfinals
A1	(Denmark) Christian Hansen (Denmark) Gitte Attle Rasmussen	21	21
B2	(Japan) Hirohisa Toshijima (Japan) Yuriko Okemoto	13	16
C1	(Japan) Noboru Nakamura (Japan) Fusako Araki	22	9
D2	(Sri Lanka) Frirs Mainaky (Sri Lanka) Rohini Jaywardena	24	21
A2	(England) Graham Holt (England) Marguerite Butt	21	18	17
B1	(Canada) Henry Paynter (Canada) Siew Har Hong	16	21	21
C2	(Denmark) Harry Skydsgaard (Denmark) Thra Gyldenoehr	15	10
D1	(England) Peter Emptage (England) Betty Bartlett	21	21

Semifinals
A1	(Denmark) Christian Hansen (Denmark) Gitte Attle Rasmussen	23	21	21
D2	(Sri Lanka) Frirs Mainaky (Sri Lanka) Rohini Jaywardena	25	18	16
B1	(Canada) Henry Paynter (Canada) Siew Har Hong	23	22
D1	(England) Peter Emptage (England) Betty Bartlett	21	20

Final
A1	(Denmark) Christian Hansen (Denmark) Gitte Attle Rasmussen	21	19	17
B1	(Canada) Henry Paynter (Canada) Siew Har Hong	18	21	21
