= 2017 BWF World Senior Championships – 55+ =

Tournament details
- Dates: 11 September 2017 – 17 September 2017
- Edition: 8
- Level: International
- Nations: 17
- Venue: Rajiv Gandhi Indoor Stadium
- Location: Kochi, India

Champions
- Men's singles: (Thailand) Pornroj Banditpisut
- Women's singles: (Germany) Heidi Bender
- Men's doubles: (Thailand) Pornroj Banditpisut (Thailand) Nattapol Sanlekanun
- Women's doubles: (Denmark) Birte Bach Steffensen (Germany) Heidi Bender
- Mixed doubles: (Indonesia) Bobby Ertanto (Germany) Heidi Bender

These are the results of 2017 BWF World Senior Championships 55+ events.

== Men's singles ==
=== Seeds ===
1. (Denmark) Per Juul (quarterfinals)
2. (Australia) Loke Poh Wong (semifinals, bronze medal)
3. (Sweden) Bengt Mellquist (quarterfinals)
4. (England) Eric Plane (second round)

=== Finals ===
Semifinals
(Thailand) Pornroj Banditpisut	21	21
(India) Harjit Singh	8	18
(India) Basant Kumar Soni	21	21
2	(Australia) Loke Poh Wong	16	16

Final
(Thailand) Pornroj Banditpisut	21	21
(India) Basant Kumar Soni	10	6

=== Top half ===
==== Section 1 ====
First Round
(England) R Wells	6	9
(Thailand) P Banditpisut	21	21
(France) M Piel	20	7
(Japan) T Owada	22	21
(India) A Raman	w	/	o
(Sri Lanka) L Karunaratne

Second Round
1	(Denmark) P Juul	15	11
(Thailand) P Banditpisut	21	21
(Japan) T Owada	21	21
(India) A Raman	12	13

Quarterfinals
(Thailand) P Banditpisut	21	21
(Japan) T Owada	15	13

==== Section 2 ====
First Round
3	(Sweden) B Mellquist	21	21
(England) G A Joyner	13	13
(France) J-M Edard	21	21
(Malaysia) Gan S H	17	12
(Poland) L Wziatek	13	16
(Germany) F Fiebig	21	21
(Japan) N Matsunari	14	7
(India) H Singh	21	21

Second Round
3	(Sweden) B Mellquist	21	21
(France) J-M Edard	15	14
(Germany) F Fiebig	21	12	9
(India) H Singh	14	21	21

Quarterfinals
3	(Sweden) B Mellquist	9	20
(India) H Singh	21	22

=== Bottom half ===
==== Section 3 ====
First Round
(Thailand) W Traisilpwissarut	21	21
(Russia) Y Skripin	14	17
(Switzerland) R Schläpfer	11	5
(India) B K Soni	21	21
(Germany) H-J Rösch	21	21
(Sweden) T Andersson	14	19
(France) J-L Le Boulc'h	18	18
4	(England) E Plane	21	21

Second Round
(Thailand) W Traisilpwissarut	3	8
(India) B K Soni	21	21
(Germany) H-J Rösch	21	18	21
4	(England) E Plane	19	21	18

Quarterfinals
(India) B K Soni	21	21
(Germany) H-J Rösch	13	18

==== Section 4 ====
First Round
(Japan) T Kamiya	21	21
(Sweden) M Reynolds	15	13
(India) B Bhosale	16	13
(Germany) J Treuke	21	21
(France) P Victorino	18	21	21
(Norway) M Aarhus	21	12	9

Second Round
(Japan) T Kamiya	24	19
(Germany) J Treuke	26	21
(France) P Victorino	11	15
2	(Australia) L P Wong	21	21

Quarterfinals
(Germany) J Treuke	21	7	17
2	(Australia) L P Wong	19	21	21

== Women's singles ==
=== Seeds ===
1. (Germany) Heidi Bender (champion, gold medal)
2. (Japan) Kuniko Yamamoto (semifinals, bronze medal)

=== Group A ===
Rank	Player	Pts	Pld	W	L	SF	SA	PF	PA
1	(Germany) Heidi Bender	2	2	2	0	4	0	84	19
2	(India) Prathibha Nair	1	2	1	1	2	2	56	74
3	(England) Janet B. Williams	0	2	0	2	0	4	37	84

Date		Score		Set 1	Set 2	Set 3
11 Sep; 10:30	Heidi Bender (Germany)	2–0	(England) Janet B. Williams	21–3	21–2	
12 Sep; 10:30	Prathibha Nair (India)	2–0	(England) Janet B. Williams	21–13	21–19	
13 Sep; 10:35	Heidi Bender (Germany)	2–0	(India) Prathibha Nair	21–5	21–9	

=== Group B ===
Rank	Player	Pts	Pld	W	L	SF	SA	PF	PA
1	(England) Sue Sheen	2	3	2	1	5	2	141	114
2	(Russia) Irina Shalmanova	2	3	2	1	4	2	112	100
3	(India) Kanchan Sane	2	3	2	1	4	3	133	121
4	(France) Marie-Laure Walther	0	3	0	3	0	6	75	126

Date		Score		Set 1	Set 2	Set 3
11 Sep; 10:30	Sue Sheen (England)	2–0	(Russia) Irina Shalmanova	21–14	21–14	
11 Sep; 11:00	Kanchan Sane (India)	2–0	(France) Marie-Laure Walther	21–13	21–9	
12 Sep; 10:30	Kanchan Sane (India)	0–2	(Russia) Irina Sahlmanova	18–21	15–21	
12 Sep; 10:30	Sue Sheen (England)	2–0	(France) Marie-Laure Walther	21–11	21–17	
13 Sep; 10:35	Kanchan Sane (India)	2–1	(England) Sue Sheen	21–19	16–21	21–17
13 Sep; 10:35	Irina Shalmanova (Russia)	2–0	(France) Marie-Laure Walther	21–14	21–11	

=== Group C ===
Rank	Player	Pts	Pld	W	L	SF	SA	PF	PA
1	(Russia) Liudmila Postnova	3	3	3	0	6	0	126	85
2	(Switzerland) Liselotte Blumer	2	3	2	1	4	4	147	143
3	(England) Susan C. Tooke	1	3	1	2	3	5	153	157
4	(India) Sukesha Saggi	0	3	0	3	2	6	117	158

Date		Score		Set 1	Set 2	Set 3
11 Sep; 11:00	Susan C. Tooke (England)	0–2	(Russia) Liudmila Postnova	19–21	17–21	
11 Sep; 11:00	Sukesha Saggi (India)	1–2	(Switzerland) Liselotte Blumer	21–12	8–21	17–21
12 Sep; 10:30	Sukesha Saggi (India)	1–2	(Russia) Liudmila Postnova	14–21	7–21	
12 Sep; 10:30	Susan C. Tooke (England)	1–2	(Switzerland) Liselotte Blumer	11–21	23–21	21–23
13 Sep; 11:10	Sukesha Saggi (India)	1–2	(England) Susan C. Tooke	22–20	12–21	16–21
13 Sep; 11:10	Liudmila Postnova (Russia)	2–0	(Switzerland) Liselotte Blumer	21–12	21–16	

=== Group D ===
Rank	Player	Pts	Pld	W	L	SF	SA	PF	PA
1	(India) Manjusha Sudhir Sahasrabudhe	2	2	2	0	4	1	105	85
2	(Japan) Kuniko Yamamoto	1	2	1	1	3	2	98	96
3	(Thailand) Juthatip Banjongsilp	0	2	0	2	0	4	62	84

Date		Score		Set 1	Set 2	Set 3
11 Sep; 11:00	Kuniko Yamamoto (Japan)	2–0	(Thailand) Juthatop Banjongsilp	21–14	21–19	
12 Sep; 10:30	Manjusha Sudhir Sahasrabudhe (India)	2–0	(Thailand) Juthatip Banjongsilp	21–13	21–16	
13 Sep; 10:35	Kuniko Yamamoto (Japan)	1–2	(India) Manjusha Sudhir Sahasrabudhe	21–19	21–23	14–21

=== Finals ===
Quarterfinals
A1	(Germany) Heidi Bender	21	21
B2	(Russia) Irina Shalmanova	14	12
C1	(Russia) Liudmila Postnova	21	17	19
D2	(Japan) Kuniko Yamamoto	14	21	21
A2	(India) Prathibha Nair	7	12
B1	(England) Sue Sheen	21	21
C2	(Switzerland) Liselotte Blumer	12	15
D1	(India) Manjusha Sudhir Sahasrabudhe	21	21

Semifinals
A1	(Germany) Heidi Bender	19	21	21
D2	(Japan) Kuniko Yamamoto	21	13	11
B1	(England) Sue Sheen	w	/	o
D1	(India) Manjusha Sudhir Sahasrabudhe

Final
A1	(Germany) Heidi Bender	21	21
B1	(England) Sue Sheen	8	8

== Men's doubles ==
=== Seeds ===
1. (Denmark) Per Juul / (Sweden) Bengt Mellquist (semifinals, bronze medal)
2. (England) Eric Plane / Roger Taylor (final, silver medal)
3. (Thailand) Bovornovadep Devakula / Chongsak Suvanich (semifinals, bronze medal)
4. (Japan) Toshiyuki Kamiya / Noriaki Matsunari (quarterfinals)

=== Finals ===
Semifinals
1	(Denmark) Per Juul (Sweden) Bengt Mellquist	8	21
(Thailand) Pornroj Banditpisut (Thailand) Nattapol Sanlekanun	21	23
3	(Thailand) Bovornovadep Devakula (Thailand) Chongsak Suvanich	21	18	19
2	(England) Eric Plane (England) Roger Taylor	18	21	21

Final
(Thailand) Pornroj Banditpisut (Thailand) Nattapol Sanlekanun	21	21
2	(England) Eric Plane (England) Roger Taylor	5	17

=== Top half ===
==== Section 1 ====
First Round	Second Round					Quarterfinals
	1	(Denmark) P Juul (Sweden) B Mellquist	23	22	21
		(England) R Leigh (England) M Summers	25	20	10
						1	(Denmark) P Juul (Sweden) B Mellquist	21	21
							(India) B Bhosale (India) S Shanbhag	14	16
	(India) B Bhosale (India) S Shanbhag		w	/	o
	(Sri Lanka) R Feranando (Sri Lanka) L Karunaratne

==== Section 2 ====
First Round
(France) J-M Edard (France) M Piel	6	11
(Thailand) P Banditpisut (Thailand) N Sanlekanun	21	21

Second Round
4	(Japan) T Kamiya (Japan) N Matsunari	22	21
(Sweden) T Andersson (Sweden) M Reynolds	20	8
(India) S Irengbam (India) S Yumkhaibam	11	6
(Thailand) P Banditpisut (Thailand) N Sanlekanun	21	21

Quarterfinals
4	(Japan) T Kamiya (Japan) N Matsunari	9	7
(Thailand) P Banditpisut (Thailand) N Sanlekanun	21	21

=== Bottom half ===
==== Section 3 ====
First Round
(India) S Desai (India) B K Soni	21	21
(France) J-L Le Boulc'h (Germany) H-J Rösch	13	11

Second Round
(India) S Desai (India) B K Soni	21	21
(Switzerland) P Dodd (Switzerland) R Schläpfer	12	14
(Malaysia) Gan S H (England) G A Joyner	21	10	12
3	(Thailand) B Devakula (Thailand) C Suvanich	16	21	21

Quarterfinals
(India) S Desai (India) B K Soni	21	15	9
3	(Thailand) B Devakula (Thailand) C Suvanich	17	21	21

==== Section 4 ====
First Round
(Germany) F Fiebig (Germany) J Treuke	12	14
(India) R Joseph (India) J Moonjappilly Francis	21	21

Second Round
(India) R Joseph (India) J Moonjappilly Francis	19	21	'21
(Denmark) J Dall-Hansen (Denmark) J C. Nielsen	21	9	11
(France) P Devigne (France) P Victorino	15	11
2	(England) E Plane (England) R Taylor	21	21

Quarterfinals
(India) R Joseph (India) J Moonjappilly Francis	16	17
2	(England) E Plane (England) R Taylor	21	21

== Women's doubles ==
=== Seeds ===
1. (Denmark) Birte Bach Steffensen / (Germany) Heidi Bender (champions, gold medal)
2. (Japan) Miyolo Sato / Kuniko Yamamoto (final, silver medal)

=== Group A ===
Rank	Player	Pts	Pld	W	L	SF	SA	PF	PA
1	(Denmark) Birte Bach Steffensen (Germany) Heidi Bender	2	2	2	0	4	0	84	53
2	(India) Manik Paranjpe (India) Kanchan Sane	1	2	1	1	2	2	67	68
3	(France) Romy Mouglalis (France) Marie-Laure Walther	0	2	0	2	0	4	54	84

Date		Score		Set 1	Set 2	Set 3
11 Sep; 13:30	Birte Bach Steffensen (Denmark); Heidi Bender (Germany)	2–0	(France) Romy Mouglalis (France) Marie-Laure Walther	21–13	21–15	
12 Sep; 17:00	Manik Paranjpe (India); Kanchan Sane (India)	2–0	(France) Romy Mouglalis (France) Marie-Laure Walther	21–11	21–15	
13 Sep; 15:00	Birte Bach Steffensen (Denmark); Heidi Bender (Germany)	2–0	(India) Manik Paranjpe (India) Kanchan Sane	21–9	21–16	

=== Group B ===
Rank	Player	Pts	Pld	W	L	SF	SA	PF	PA
1	(England) Sue Sheen (England) Susan C. Tooke	1	1	1	0	2	0	42	11
2	(Russia) Valentina Kolosova (Russia) Liudmila Zdanovich	0	1	0	1	0	2	11	42
	(India) Geetha Johri (India) Taramati Parmar	Retired							

Date		Score		Set 1	Set 2	Set 3
11 Sep; 13:00	Geetha Johri (India); Taramati Parmar (India)	~~1–2~~	(Russia) Valentina Kolosova (Russia) Liudmila Zdanovich	~~14–21~~	~~21–18~~	~~7–21~~
12 Sep; 17:00	Sue Sheen (England); Susan C. Tooke (England)	2–0	(Russia) Valentina Kolosova (Russia) Liudmila Zdanovich	21–6	21–5	
	Geetha Johri (India); Taramati Parmar (India)	w/o	(England) Sue Sheen (England) Susan C. Tooke			

=== Group C ===
Rank	Player	Pts	Pld	W	L	SF	SA	PF	PA
1	(Russia) Liumila Postnova (Russia) Irina Shalmanova	2	2	2	0	4	0	84	49
2	(India) Prathibha Nair (India) Sukesha Saggi	1	2	1	1	2	2	79	73
3	(England) Jackie Addison (England) Anita Harris	0	2	0	2	0	4	43	84

Date		Score		Set 1	Set 2	Set 3
11 Sep; 13:30	Prathibha Nair (India); Sukesha Saggi (India)	0–2	(Russia) Liudmila Postnova (Russia) Irina Shalmanova	19–21	18–21	
12 Sep; 17:00	Jackie Addison (England); Anita Harris (England)	0–2	(Russia) Liudmila Postnova (Russia) Irina Shalmanova	4–21	8–21	
13 Sep; 15:00	Prathibha Nair (India); Sukesha Saggi (India)	2–0	(England) Jackie Addison (England) Anita Harris	21–14	21–17	

=== Group D ===
Rank	Player	Pts	Pld	W	L	SF	SA	PF	PA
1	(Japan) Miyoko Sato (Japan) Kuniko Yamamoto	2	2	2	0	4	0	84	25
2	(India) Sujatha Handattu Subraya (India) Roshan Marol	1	2	1	1	2	2	55	65
3	(France) Chantal Piron (Germany) Christa Sprotte	0	2	0	2	0	4	35	84

Date		Score		Set 1	Set 2	Set 3
11 Sep; 13:30	Miyoko Sato (Japan); Kuniko Yamamoto (Japan)	2–0	(France) Chantal Piron (Germany) Christa Sprotte	21–5	21–7	
12 Sep; 17:00	Sujatha Handattu Subraya (India); Roshan Marol (India)	2–0	(France) Chantal Piron (Germany) Christa Sprotte	21–12	21–11	
13 Sep; 15:00	Miyoko Sato (Japan); Kuniko Yamamoto (Japan)	2–0	(India) Sujatha Handattu Subraya (India) Roshan Marol	21–9	21–4	

=== Finals ===
Quarterfinals
A1	(Denmark) Birte Bach Steffensen (Germany) Heidi Bender	21	21
D2	(India) Sujatha Handattu Subraya (India) Roshan Marol	11	19
B1	(England) Sue Sheen (England) Susan C. Tooke	21	21
C2	(India) Prathibha Nair (India) Sukesha Saggi	12	17
A2	(India) Manik Paranjpe (India) Kanchan Sane	2	11
C1	(Russia) Liumila Postnova (Russia) Irina Shalmanova	21	21
B2	(Russia) Valentina Kolosova (Russia) Liudmila Zdanovich	7	10
D1	(Japan) Miyoko Sato (Japan) Kuniko Yamamoto	21	21

Semifinals
A1	(Denmark) Birte Bach Steffensen (Germany) Heidi Bender	17	21	21
B1	(England) Sue Sheen (England) Susan C. Tooke	21	16	7
C1	(Russia) Liumila Postnova (Russia) Irina Shalmanova	15	17
D1	(Japan) Miyoko Sato (Japan) Kuniko Yamamoto	21	21

Final
A1	(Denmark) Birte Bach Steffensen (Germany) Heidi Bender	21	21
D1	(Japan) Miyoko Sato (Japan) Kuniko Yamamoto	12	15

== Mixed doubles ==
=== Seeds ===
1. (Indonesia) Bobby Ertanto / (Germany) Heidi Bender (champions, gold medal)
2. (Japan) Toshiyuki Kamiya / Kuniko Yamamoto (quarterfinals)
3. (Japan) Noriaki Matusnari / Miyoko Sato (semifinals, bronze medal)
4. (Sweden) Bengt Mellquist / (England) Sue Sheen (semifinals, bronze medal)

=== Finals ===
Semifinals
1	(Indonesia) Bobby Ertanto (Germany) Heidi Bender	21	21
3	(Japan) Noriaki Matsunari (Japan) Miyoko Sato	9	13
4	(Sweden) Bengt Mellquist (England) Sue Sheen	12	23	8
(Thailand) Bovornovadep Devakula (Thailand) Juthatip Banjongsilp	21	21	21

Final
1	(Indonesia) Bobby Ertanto (Germany) Heidi Bender	21	21
(Thailand) Bovornovadep Devakula (Thailand) Juthatip Banjongsilp	15	8

=== Top half ===
==== Section 1 ====
First Round	Second Round				Quarterfinals
	1	(Indonesia) B Ertanto (Germany) H Bender	21	21
		(India) H Singh (India) S Saggi	8	8
					1	(Indonesia) B Ertanto (Germany) H Bender	21	21
						(Germany) F Fiebig (Germany) C Sprotte	6	7
	(Sweden) T Andersson (Russia) L Zdanovich		16	13
	(Germany) F Fiebig (Germany) C Sprotte		21	21

==== Section 2 ====
First Round
(England) J Kindred (England) J Flower	11	8
(Republic of Ireland) G Henderson (England) S C. Tooke	21	21

Second Round
3	(Japan) N Matsunari (Japan) M Sato	17	21	21
(India) R Joseph (India) M Paranjpe	21	16	19
(France) J-M Edard (France) C Piron	6	15
(Republic of Ireland) G Henderson (England) S C. Tooke	21	21

Quarterfinals
3	(Japan) N Matsunari (Japan) M Sato	21	25
(Republic of Ireland) G Henderson (England) S C. Tooke	13	23

=== Bottom half ===
==== Section 3 ====
First Round
(Denmark) J Dall-Hansen (Denmark) B B Steffensen	21	21
(Switzerland) P Dodd (Switzerland) L Blumer	17	12

Second Round
(Denmark) J Dall-Hansen (Denmark) B B Steffensen	21	21
(India) V Saraf (India) M S Sahasrabudhe	14	16
(France) P Victorino (France) H Hay	13	10
(Sweden) B Mellquist (England) S Sheen	21	21

Quarterfinals
(Denmark) J Dall-Hansen (Denmark) B B Steffensen	18	15
(Sweden) B Mellquist (England) S Sheen	21	21

==== Section 4 ====
First Round
(India) A Bhandari (India) P Nair	21	10	11
(Thailand) B Devakula (Thailand) J Banjongsilp	17	21	21

Second Round
(Thailand) B Devakula (Thailand) J Banjongsilp	21	21
(England) M Summers (Russia) I Shalmanova	15	17
(France) M Piel (France) M-L Walther	7	12
2	(Japan) T Kamiya (Japan) K Yamamoto	21	21

Quarterfinals
(Thailand) B Devakula (Thailand) J Banjongsilp	19	21	21
2	(Japan) T Kamiya (Japan) K Yamamoto	21	14	16
