= 2017 BWF World Senior Championships – 50+ =

Tournament details
- Dates: 11 September 2017 – 17 September 2017
- Edition: 9
- Level: International
- Nations: 21
- Venue: Rajiv Gandhi Indoor Stadium
- Location: Kochi, India

Champions
- Men's singles: (Thailand) Karoon Kasayapanan
- Women's singles: (Hong Kong) Zhou Xin
- Men's doubles: (Indonesia) Bobby Ertanto (Malaysia) Ting Wei Ping
- Women's doubles: (England) Betty Blair (England) Debora Miller
- Mixed doubles: (Indonesia) Alexander Tandun (Indonesia) Rosiana Tendean

These are the results of 2017 BWF World Senior Championships' 50+ events.

== Men's singles ==
=== Seeds ===
1. (Thailand) Narong Vanichitsarakul (final, silver medal)
2. (Austria) Peter Moritz (second round)
3. (Sweden) Magnus Nytell (withdrew)
4. (Thailand) Surachai Makkasasithorn (third round)
5. (France) Jean-Jacques Bontemps (quarterfinals)
6. (Germany) Klaus Buschbeck (quarterfinals)
7. (Malaysia) Chang Kim Long (second round)
8. (Thailand) Karoon Kasayapanan (champion, gold medal)

== Results ==
=== Finals ===
Semifinals
1	(Thailand) Narong Vanichitsarakul	16	21	21
(Indonesia) Edi Ismanto	21	18	3
(India) Murli Subramaniam	21	18	16
8	(Thailand) Karoon Kasayapanan	18	21	21

Final
1	(Thailand) Narong Vanichitsarakul	12	15
8	(Thailand) Karoon Kasayapanan	21	21

=== Top half ===
==== Section 1 ====
First Round
(Denmark) E Pedersen	19	14
(India) J Dewangan	21	21
(Sri Lanka) R Feranando	20	11
(France) S Defraye	22	21

Second Round
1	(Thailand) N Vanichitsarakul	21	21
(Japan) F Matsuura	15	17
(Sweden) N Carlson
(India) J Dewangan	w	/	o
6	(Germany) K Buschbeck	21	21
(Malaysia) J Lumak	9	7
(Switzerland) W Stuber	10	15
(France) S Defraye	21	21

Third Round
1	(Thailand) N Vanichitsarakul	21	21
(India) J Dewangan	15	13
6	(Germany) K Buschbeck	21	21
(France) S Defraye	11	11

Quarterfinals
1	(Thailand) N Vanichitsarakul	21	21
6	(Germany) K Buschbeck	19	14

==== Section 2 ====
First Round
(Japan) T Koizumi	17	19
(Uzbekistan) O Savatugin	21	21
(Switzerland) H Mueller	16	15
(Indonesia) E Ismanto	21	21

Second Round
(Sweden) A Persson	8	8
(France) J-C Lempereur	21	21
(Sri Lanka) W Niroshana	21	21
(Uzbekistan) O Savatugin	11	14
7	(Malaysia) Chang K L	21	16	19
(Thailand) M Gumlaitong	17	21	21
(India) R Lakhan	21	17
(Indonesia) E Ismanto	23	21

Third Round
(France) J-C Lempereur	14	21	13
(Sri Lanka) W Niroshana	21	19	21
(Thailand) M Gumlaitong	24	13
(Indonesia) E Ismanto	26	21

Quarterfinals
(Sri Lanka) W Niroshana	15	10
(Indonesia) E Ismanto	21	21

=== Bottom half ===
==== Section 3 ====
First Round
(England) C Babu	8	9
(Germany) U Pawelek	21	21
(Sweden) S Hellström	21	21
(Sri Lanka) A Dodampe Gamage	12	11
(Switzerland) D Cattin	14	14
(Indonesia) A Tandun	21	21

Second Round
(Germany) U Pawelek	19	21	21
(Japan) K Oura	21	15	18
(Sweden) S Hellström	13	19
5	(France) J-J Bontemps	21	21
(Indonesia) A Tandun	10	22
(India) M Subramaniam	21	24
(Malaysia) Loh S C	12	13
4	(Thailand) S Makkasasithorn	21	21

Third Round
(Germany) U Pawelek	21	16	19
5	(France) J-J Bontemps	16	21	21
(India) M Subramaniam	21	18	21
4	(Thailand) S Makkasasithorn	12	21	10

Quarterfinals
5	(France) J-J Bontemps	16	17
(India) M Subramaniam	21	21

==== Section 4 ====
First Round
(Malaysia) Hong H H
(Indonesia) K Tan	w	/	o
(Sri Lanka) A Jayantha	21	21
(Norway) T R Johansen	7	6

Second Round
(Indonesia) K Tan	21	21
(France) L Soria	11	8
(Sweden) P Lindau	5	13
8	(Thailand) K Kasayapanan	21	21
(Sri Lanka) A Jayantha	10	14
(Germany) B Raj	21	21
(India) Laithanzuala	21	21
2	(Austria) P Moritz	14	14

Third Round
(Indonesia) K Tan	15	11
8	(Thailand) K Kasayapanan	21	21
(Germany) B Raj	21	7	12
(India) Laithanzuala	19	21	21

Quarterfinals
8	(Thailand) K Kasayapanan	21	21
(India) Laithanzuala	9	19

== Women's singles ==
=== Seeds ===
1. (England) Betty Blair (semifinals, bronze medal)
2. (Germany) Ye Wang (semifinals, bronze medal)
3. (Switzerland) Bettina Villars (second round)
4. (Hong Kong) Zhou Xin (champion, gold medal)

=== Finals ===
Semifinals
1	(England) Betty Blair	16	21	18
(Germany) Tanja Eberl	21	16	21
4	(Hong Kong) Zhou Xin	w	/	o
2	(Germany) Ye Wang

Final
(Germany) Tanja Eberl	16	21	18
4	(Hong Kong) Zhou Xin	21	18	21

=== Top half ===
==== Section 1 ====
First Round	Second Round					Quarterfinals
	1	(England) B Blair	w	/	o
		(India) A Jhaveri
						1	(England) B Blair	21	21
							(Russia) E Golubeva	17	15
	(Russia) E Golubeva		21	15	26
	(Netherlands) G Kakiay		15	21	24

==== Section 2 ====
First Round	Second Round				Quarterfinals
	3	(Switzerland) B Villars	18	8
		(Germany) T Eberl	21	21
					(Germany) T Eberl	21	21
					(India) U Sangore	9	8
	(South Africa) L Fry		18	12
	(India) U Sangore		21	21

=== Bottom half ===
==== Section 3 ====
First Round
(Russia) E Solodukhina	13	16
(India) S Rajgopalan	21	21

Second Round
(India) S Rajgopalan	21	21
(Norway) B Thyness	14	15
(Germany) M Tusche	9	8
4	(Hong Kong) Zhou X	21	21

Quarterfinals
(India) S Rajgopalan	11	17
4	(Hong Kong) Zhou X	21	21

==== Section 4 ====
First Round	Second Round				Quarterfinals
	(England) D Miler		18	17
	(India) S Sawant		21	21
						(India) S Sawant	20	18
					2	(Germany) Y Wang	22	21
		(Uzbekistan) F Demenskaya	6	12
	2	(Germany) Y Wang	21	21

== Men's doubles ==
=== Seeds ===
1. (Thailand) Surachai Makkasasithorn / Narong Vanichitsarakul (second round)
2. (Sweden) Patrik Bjorkler / (England) Nick Ponting (quarterfinals)
3. (Sweden) Magnus Nytell / Erik Soderberg (quarterfinals)
4. (Indonesia) Karyanto Tan / Alexander Tandun (second round)

=== Finals ===
Semifinals
(Indonesia) Bobby Ertanto (Malaysia) Ting Wei Ping	13	21	21
(India) Bhushan Akut (India) George Thomas	21	10	17
(Republic of Ireland) Graham Handerson (Republic of Ireland) Mark Topping	21	21
(Thailand) Mongkol Gumlaitong (Thailand) Karoon Kasayapana	15	12

Final
(Indonesia) Bobby Ertanto (Malaysia) Ting Wei Ping	21	16	21
(Republic of Ireland) Graham Handerson (Republic of Ireland) Mark Topping	17	21	13

=== Top half ===
==== Section 1 ====
First Round
(Sweden) N Carlson (Sweden) A Persson	7	8
(Indonesia) B Ertanto (Malaysia) Ting W P	21	21
(Switzerland) D Cattin (Switzerland) W Stuber	11	5
(Japan) T Koizumi (Japan) T Owada	21	21

Second Round
1	(Thailand) S Makkasasithorn (Thailand) N Vanichitsarakul	18	21	14
(Indonesia) B Ertanto (Malaysia) Ting W P	21	17	21
(Austria) P Moritz (Uzbekistan) O Savatugin
(Japan) T Koizumi (Japan) T Owada	w	/	o

Quarterfinals
(Indonesia) B Ertanto (Malaysia) Ting W P	21	21
(Japan) T Koizumi (Japan) T Owada	10	17

==== Section 2 ====
First Round
(India) B Akut (India) G Thomas	21	21
(Sweden) S Hellström (England) C Hufflett	8	8
(Sri Lanka) R Feranando (Norway) T R Johansen	8	9
(Sri Lanka) A Dendeng (Sri Lanka) W Niroshana	21	21

Second Round
4	(Indonesia) K Tan (Indonesia) A Tandun	8	15
(India) B Akut (India) G Thomas	21	21
(France) S Defraye (France) L Soria	9	21	9
(Sri Lanka) A Dendeng (Sri Lanka) W Niroshana	21	18	21

Quarterfinals
(India) B Akut (India) G Thomas	21	21
(Sri Lanka) A Dendeng (Sri Lanka) W Niroshana	16	11

=== Bottom half ===
==== Section 3 ====
First Round
(Japan) F Matsuura (Japan) K Oura	21	21
(France) J-C Lempereur (France) B Marimoutou	10	13
(India) R Lakhan (India) V Swaroop	13	21	11
(Indonesia) P Tan (Indonesia) S H Wahono	21	16	21

Second Round
(Japan) F Matsuura (Japan) K Oura	7	21	11
(Republic of Ireland) G Handerson (Republic of Ireland) M Topping	21	19	21
(Indonesia) P Tan (Indonesia) S H Wahono	14	21	13
3	(Sweden) M Nytell (Sweden) E Soderberg	21	17	21

Quarterfinals
(Republic of Ireland) G Handerson (Republic of Ireland) M Topping	14	21	25
3	(Sweden) M Nytell (Sweden) E Soderberg	21	10	23

==== Section 4 ====
First Round
(Germany) K Buschbeck (Germany) U Pawelek	18	21	9
(Thailand) M Gumlaitong (Thailand) K Kasayapana	21	14	21
(India) V S Akula (India) P N N Kona	21	22	18
(Malaysia) Chang K L (Malaysia) Loh S C	11	24	21

Second Round
(Thailand) M Gumlaitong (Thailand) K Kasayapana	21	21
(Sweden) P Lindau (Switzerland) H Mueller	16	14
(Malaysia) Chang K L (Malaysia) Loh S C	11	7
2	(Sweden) P Bjorkler (England) N Ponting	21	21

Quarterfinals
(Thailand) M Gumlaitong (Thailand) K Kasayapana	21	20	21
2	(Sweden) P Bjorkler (England) N Ponting	15	22	18

== Women's doubles ==
=== Seeds ===
1. (England) Betty Blair / Debora Miller (champions, gold medal)
2. (Germany) Ye Wang / (Hong Kong) Zhou Xin (final, silver medal)

=== Group A ===
Rank	Player	Pts	Pld	W	L	SF	SA	PF	PA
1	(England) Betty Blair (England) Debora Miller	1	1	1	0	2	0	42	15
2	(India) Lali Joseph (India) Joseph Tessy	0	1	0	1	0	2	15	42

Date		Score		Set 1	Set 2	Set 3
11 Sep; 12:00	Betty Blair (England); Debora Miller (England)	2–0	(India) Lali Joseph (India) Joseph Tessy	21–8	21–7	

=== Group B ===
Rank	Player	Pts	Pld	W	L	SF	SA	PF	PA
1	(Netherlands) Grace Kakiay (Norway) Berit Thyness	2	2	2	0	4	1	95	73
2	(India) Kavita Dixit (India) Suzanne Venglet	1	2	1	1	3	2	103	84
3	(Uzbekistan) Firdaus Demenskaya (South Africa) Lynne Fry	0	2	0	2	0	4	46	87

Date		Score		Set 1	Set 2	Set 3
11 Sep; 12:00	Kavita Dixit (India); Suzanne Venglet (India)	2–0	(Uzbekistan) Firdus Demenskaya (South Africa) Lynne Fry	24–22	21–9	
12 Sep; 11:30	Grace Kakiay (Hungary); Berit Thyness (Norway)	2–0	(Uzbekistan) Firdus Demenskaya (South Africa) Lynne Fry	21–9	21–6	
13 Sep; 11:10	Kavita Dixit (India); Suzanne Venglet (India)	1–2	(Hungary) Grace Kakiay (Norway) Berit Thyness	21–11	19–21	18–21

=== Group C ===
Rank	Player	Pts	Pld	W	L	SF	SA	PF	PA
1	(England) Diane Durston (Sweden) Anki Gunners	1	1	1	0	2	0	42	31
2	(Germany) Doris Reriche (Germany) Martina Tusche	0	1	0	1	0	2	31	42
	(India) Arpita Jhaveri (India) Surekha Satam	Withdrew							

Date		Score		Set 1	Set 2	Set 3
12 Sep; 11:30	Diane Durston (England); Anki Gunners (Sweden)	2–0	(Germany) Doris Reiche (Germany) Martina Tusche	21–18	21–13	

=== Group D ===
Rank	Player	Pts	Pld	W	L	SF	SA	PF	PA
1	(Germany) Ye Wang (Hong Kong) Zhou Xin	2	2	2	0	4	0	84	53
2	(Russia) Elena Golubeva (Russia) Elena Solodukhina	1	2	1	1	2	2	66	77
3	(India) Manjusha Sudhir Sahasrabudhe (India) Saroj Sawant	0	2	0	2	0	4	64	84

Date		Score		Set 1	Set 2	Set 3
11 Sep; 13:30	Manjusha Sudhir Sahasrabudhe (India); Saroj Sawant (India)	0–2	(Russia) Elena Golubeva (Russia) Elena Solodukhina	19–21	16–21	
12 Sep; 13:30	Ye Wang (Germany); Zhou Xin (Hong Kong)	2–0	(India) Manjusha Sudhir Sahasrabudhe (India) Saroh Sawant	21–10	21–19	
13 Sep; 12:00	Ye Wang (Germany); Zhou Xin (Hong Kong)	2–0	(Russia) Elena Golubeva (Russia) Elena Solodukhina	21–15	21–9	

=== Finals ===
Quarterfinals
A1	(England) Betty Blair (England) Debora Miller	21	21
D2	(Russia) Elena Golubeva (Russia) Elena Solodukhina	11	12
C1	(England) Diane Durston (Sweden) Anki Gunners	16	21	19
B2	(India) Kavita Dixit (India) Suzanne Venglet	21	17	21
C2	(Germany) Doris Reriche (Germany) Martina Tusche	12	13
B1	(Netherlands) Grace Kakiay (Norway) Berit Thyness	21	21
A2	(India) Lali Joseph (India) Joseph Tessy	4	12
D1	(Germany) Ye Wang (Hong Kong) Zhou Xin	21	21

Semifinals
A1	(England) Betty Blair (England) Debora Miller	21	21
B2	(India) Kavita Dixit (India) Suzanne Venglet	12	19
B1	(Netherlands) Grace Kakiay (Norway) Berit Thyness	11	7
D1	(Germany) Ye Wang (Hong Kong) Zhou Xin	21	21

Final
A1	(England) Betty Blair (England) Debora Miller	21	21
D1	(Germany) Ye Wang (Hong Kong) Zhou Xin	15	9

== Mixed doubles ==
=== Seeds ===
1. (Sweden) Magnus Nytell / (Hungary) Grace Kakiay (semifinals, bronze medal)
2. (Sweden) Erik Soderberg / Anki Gunners (semifinals, bronze medal)
3. (Japan) Toru Koizumi / Naoko Saegusa (quarterfinals)
4. (Republic of Ireland) Mark Topping / (England) Debora Miller (final, silver medal)

=== Finals ===
Semifinals
1	(Sweden) Magnus Nytell (Hungary) Grace Kakiay	11	10
4	(Republic of Ireland) Mark Topping (England) Debora Miller	21	21
(Indonesia) Alexander Tandun (Indonesia) Rosiana Tendean	22	21
2	(Sweden) Erik Soderberg (Sweden) Anki Gunners	20	12

Final
4	(Republic of Ireland) Mark Topping (England) Debora Miller	21	12	14
(Indonesia) Alexander Tandun (Indonesia) Rosiana Tendean	19	21	21

=== Top half ===
==== Section 1 ====
First Round
(Sweden) N Carlsson (Russia) L Postnova	21	21
(England) C Hafflett (England) D Durston	18	10
(Germany) B Raj (Germany) J Dudek	21	10	21
(India) V B K R Kalidindi (India) K Dixit	19	21	10

Second Round
1	(Sweden) M Nytell (Hungary) G Kakiay	19	21	21
(Sweden) N Carlsson (Russia) L Postnova	21	12	13
(France) L Soria (France) C Bertrand	21	15	16
(Germany) B Raj (Germany) J Dudek	17	21	21

Quarterfinals
1	(Sweden) M Nytell (Hungary) G Kakiay	21	21
(Germany) B Raj (Germany) J Dudek	10	12

==== Section 2 ====
First Round
(England) G A Joyner (Russia) E Golubeva	21	21
(Germany) H-J Rösch (Germany) M Tusche	11	7
(India) B Akut (India) S Sawant	21	21
(England) L P Loo (England) A Baker	9	7

Second Round
4	(Republic of Ireland) M Topping (England) D Miller	21	21
(England) G A Joyner (Russia) E Golubeva	9	15
(France) S Defraye (France) R Mouglalis	8	11
(India) B Akut (India) S Sawant	21	21

Quarterfinals
4	(Republic of Ireland) M Topping (England) D Miller	21	21
(India) B Akut (India) S Sawant	9	13

=== Bottom half ===
==== Section 3 ====
First Round
(South Africa) j Croukamp (South Africa) L Fry	5	10
(Indonesia) A Tandun (Indonesia) R Rendean	21	21
(Germany) J Treuke (Germany) D Reiche	21	21
(England) R Traviss (England) A Harris	17	17

Second Round
(Indonesia) A Tandun (Indonesia) R Rendean	21	21
(India) A Biniwale (India) S Rajgopalan	13	14
(Germany) J Treuke (Germany) D Reiche	5	10
3	(Japan) T Koizumi (Japan) N Saegusa	21	21

Quarterfinals
(Indonesia) A Tandun (Indonesia) R Rendean	21	21
3	(Japan) T Koizumi (Japan) N Saegusa	10	9

==== Section 4 ====
First Round
(India) M Malleshappa (India) M Padival	24	21
(Sweden) P Lindau (Norway) B Thyness	22	12
(Norway) T R Johansen (Uzbekistan) F Demenskaya	7	7
(Germany) K Buschbeck (Germany) T Eberl	21	21

Second Round
(India) M Malleshappa (India) M Padival	21	21
(France) J-C Lemperpeur (France) S Leverdez	15	11
(Germany) K Buschbeck (Germany) T Eberl	15	14
2	(Sweden) E Soderberg (Sweden) A Gunners	21	21

Quarterfinals
(India) M Malleshappa (India) M Padival	12	14
2	(Sweden) E Soderberg (Sweden) A Gunners	21	21
