= Bobby Ertanto =

Indonesian badminton player (born 1960)

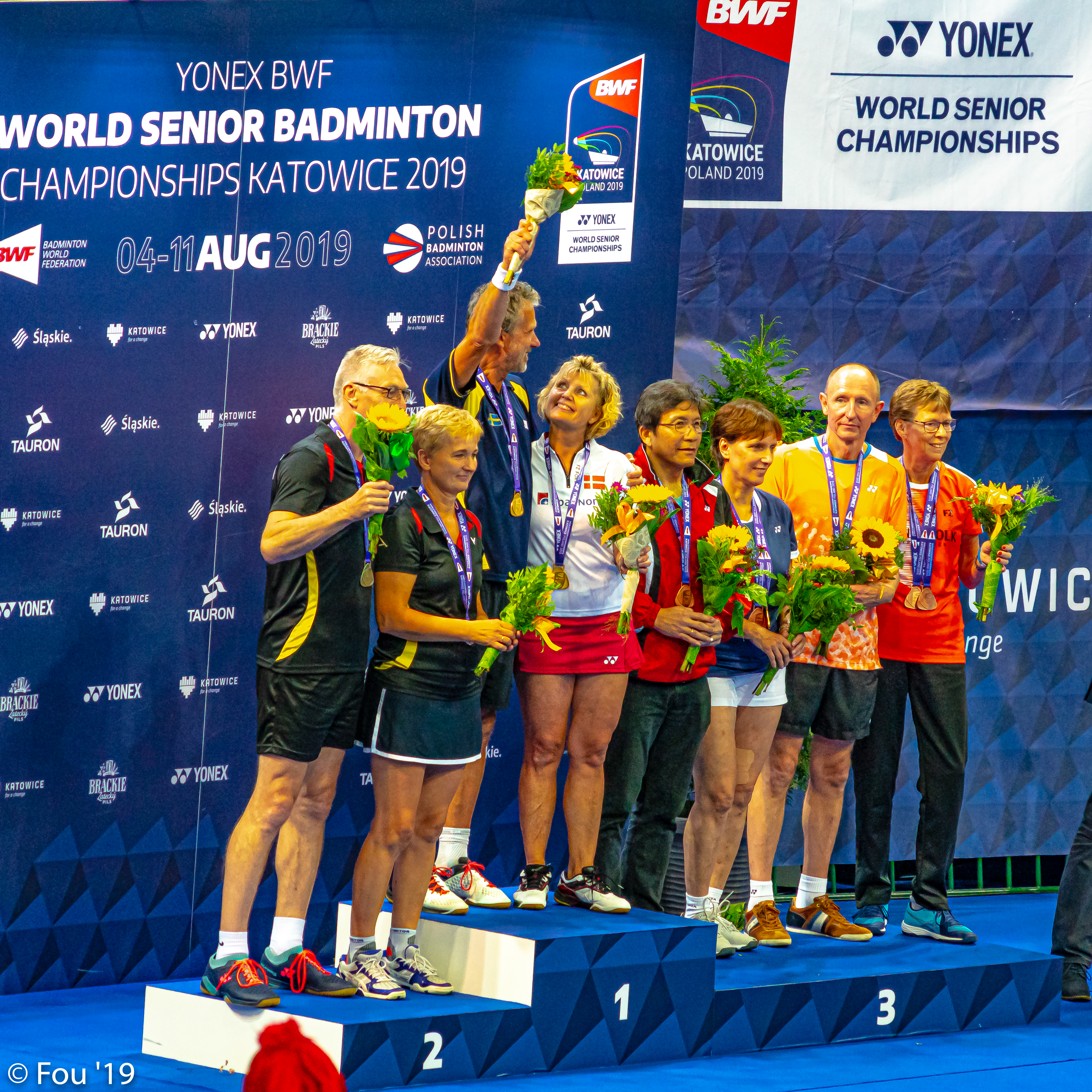

Personal information
- Born: Bobby Ertanto Kurniawan; 2 August 1960 (age 66) Surabaya, East Java, Indonesia

Sport
- Country: Indonesia
- Sport: Badminton
- Handedness: Right
- Coached by: Ong Thio Djian
- Event: Men's doubles

Men's doubles
- BWF profile
Medal record
Men's badminton
Representing Indonesia
World Championships
Bronze medal – third place	1983 Copenhagen	Men's doubles
World Cup
Gold medal – first place	1986 Jakarta	Men's doubles
Silver medal – second place	1983 Kuala Lumpur	Men's doubles
Bronze medal – third place	1985 Jakarta	Men's doubles
World Masters Games
Gold medal – first place	2017 Auckland	Men's doubles 45+
Gold medal – first place	2017 Auckland	Men's doubles 55+
Silver medal – second place	2025 Taipei	Men's doubles 60+
Bronze medal – third place	2009 Sydney	Mixed doubles 40+
World Senior Championships
Gold medal – first place	2017 Kochi	Men's doubles 50+
Gold medal – first place	2017 Kochi	Mixed doubles 55+
Silver medal – second place	2007 Taipei	Men's doubles 45+
Silver medal – second place	2013 Ankara	Men's doubles 50+
Bronze medal – third place	2007 Taipei	Mixed doubles 45+
Bronze medal – third place	2019 Katowice	Mixed doubles 55+
Bronze medal – third place	2025 Pattaya	Men's doubles 60+
Thomas Cup
Silver medal – second place	1986 Jakarta	Men's team
Bronze medal – third place	1988 Kuala Lumpur	Men's team
Asian Games
Bronze medal – third place	1986 Seoul	Men's doubles
Bronze medal – third place	1986 Seoul	Men's team
Asian Championships
Silver medal – second place	1987 Semarang	Men's team
SEA Games
Gold medal – first place	1983 Singapore	Men's doubles
Gold medal – first place	1983 Singapore	Men's team
Gold medal – first place	1987 Jakarta	Men's team
Silver medal – second place	1983 Singapore	Mixed doubles
Bronze medal – third place	1987 Jakarta	Men's doubles
Asian Junior Championships
Gold medal – first place	1976 Hyderabad	Boys' doubles
Southeast Asian Junior Championships
Gold medal – first place	1978 Singapore	Boys' singles
Gold medal – first place	1978 Singapore	Boys' team

Bobby Ertanto (Chinese: 葉忠明, born 2 August 1960) is a retired badminton player from Indonesia who specialized in doubles.

== Career ==
Paired with a variety of fellow countrymen, he shared the Malaysia Open title in 1983, the Thailand Open title in 1985, the Badminton World Cup title in 1986, and the Asian Championships in 1987. He won mixed doubles at the 1986 Malaysia Open with Verawaty Wiharjo. Ertanto earned a bronze medal with Christian Hadinata at the 1983 IBF World Championships in Copenhagen. As a member of Indonesia's 1988 Thomas Cup team, Ertanto and partner Liem Swie King dropped the decisive final match in a narrow loss to Malaysia.

In 2013, he finished as a runner-up at the World Senior Championships in the men's doubles 50 in Turkey, and in 2017, he won double titles in the men's doubles 50 and mixed doubles 55 in Kochi, India.

== Achievements ==
=== World Championships ===
Men's doubles
Year	Venue	Partner	Opponent	Score	Result
1983	Brøndbyhallen, Copenhagen, Denmark	(Indonesia) Christian Hadinata	(Denmark) Steen Fladberg (Denmark) Jesper Helledie	16–18, 11–15	Bronze

=== World Cup ===
Men's doubles
Year	Venue	Partner	Opponent	Score	Result
1983	Stadium Negara, Kuala Lumpur, Malaysia	(Indonesia) Christian Hadinata	(South Korea) Park Joo-bong (South Korea) Kim Moon-soo	6–15, 11–15	Silver
1985	Istora Senayan, Jakarta, Indonesia	(Indonesia) Hadibowo Susanto	(China) Li Yongbo (China) Tian Bingyi	7–15, 12–15	Bronze
1986	Istora Senayan, Jakarta, Indonesia	(Indonesia) Liem Swie King	(Indonesia) Hadibowo Susanto (Indonesia) Rudy Heryanto	15–6, 15–5	Gold

=== World Masters Games ===
Men's doubles
Year	Age	Venue	Partner	Opponent	Score	Result	Ref.
2017	45+	Auckland Badminton Centre; Auckland, New Zealand	(Indonesia) Tri Cahyo Agus Nugroho	(Indonesia) Johan Cahyadi (Indonesia) Lie Chandra	21–19, 21–14	Gold	
2017	55+	Auckland Badminton Centre; Auckland, New Zealand	(Indonesia) Simbarsono Sutanto	(Indonesia) Angga Ang (Indonesia) Ali Winoto	22–20, 21–14	Gold	
2025	60+	Taipei Gymnasium; Taipei, Taiwan	(Indonesia) Effendy Widjaja	(Chinese Taipei) Yang Shih-jeng (Chinese Taipei) Ko Hsin-ming		Silver	

Mixed doubles
Year	Age	Venue	Partner	Opponent	Score	Result	Ref.
2009	40+	Sydney Olympic Park Sports Centre; Sydney, Australia	(Indonesia) Rosiana Tendean	(Pakistan) Mir Ishaq (Pakistan) Batool Kazim	Walkover	Bronze	

=== World Senior Championships ===
Men's doubles
Year	Age	Venue	Partner	Opponent	Score	Result	Ref.
2007	45+	Taipei Gymnasium; Taipei, Taiwan	(Indonesia) Simbarsono Sutanto	(Chinese Taipei) Chang Wen-sung (Chinese Taipei) Huang Cheng-lung		Silver	
2013	50+	Ankara Spor Salunu Stadium; Ankara, Turkey	(Indonesia) Simbarsono Sutanto	(Denmark) Morten Christensen (Denmark) Martin Qvist Olesen	19–21, 18–21	Silver	
2017	50+	Rajiv Gandhi Indoor Stadium; Kochi, India	(Malaysia) Ting Wei Ping	(Republic of Ireland) Graham Henderson (Republic of Ireland) Mark Topping	21–17, 16–21, 21–13	Gold	
2023	60+	Hwasan Indoor Stadium; Jeonju, South Korea	(Indonesia) Effendy Widjaja	(Sweden) Jan-Eric Antonsson (Denmark) Jan Bertram Petersen	21–17, 18–21, 15–21	Bronze	
2025	45+	Eastern National Sports Training Centre; Pattaya, Thailand	(Indonesia) Eddy Hartono	(Thailand) Surachai Makkasasithorn (Thailand) Narong Vanichitsarakul	Walkover	Bronze	

Mixed doubles
Year	Age	Venue	Partner	Opponent	Score	Result	Ref.
2017	55+	Rajiv Gandhi Indoor Stadium; Kochi, India	(Germany) Heidi Bender	(Thailand) Bovornovadep Devakula (Thailand) Juthatip Banjongslip	21–15, 21–8	Gold	
2019	55+	Spodek; Katowice, Poland	(Germany) Heidi Bender	(Sweden) Magnus Nytell (Denmark) Helle Sjørring	20–22, 21–16, 17–21	Bronze	

=== Asian Games ===
Men's doubles
Year	Venue	Partner	Opponent	Score	Result
1986	Olympic Gymnastics Arena, Seoul, South Korea	(Indonesia) Liem Swie King	(China) Li Yongbo (China) Tian Bingyi	6–15, 9–15	Bronze

=== SEA Games ===
Men's doubles
Year	Venue	Partner	Opponent	Score	Result
1983	Singapore Badminton Hall, Singapore	(Indonesia) Christian Hadinata	(Indonesia) Hadibowo Susanto (Indonesia) Liem Swie King	8–15, 15–9, 15–5	Gold
1987	Kuningan Hall, Jakarta, Indonesia	(Indonesia) Rudy Heryanto	(Thailand) Sawei Chanseorasmee (Thailand) Sakrapee Thongsari	13–15, 7–15	Bronze

=== Asian Junior Championships ===
Boys' doubles
Year	Venue	Partner	Opponent	Score	Result	Ref.
1976	Fateh Maidan Indoor Stadium; Hyderabad, India	(Indonesia) Rudy Dendeng	(Thailand) Sarit Pisudchaikul (Thailand) Sawei Chanseorasmee	8–15, 15–11, 15–13	Gold	

=== IBF World Grand Prix (6 titles, 6 runners-up) ===
The World Badminton Grand Prix has been sanctioned by the International Badminton Federation from 1983 to 2006.

Men's doubles
Year	Tournament	Partner	Opponent	Score	Result
1983	Chinese Taipei Open	(Indonesia) Hadibowo Susanto	(Sweden) Thomas Kihlström (Sweden) Stefan Karlsson	15–9, 15–11	(gold) Winner
1983	Malaysia Open	(Indonesia) Christian Hadinata	(South Korea) Park Joo-bong (South Korea) Sung Han-kuk	15–10, 15–5	(gold) Winner
1983	Indonesia Open	(Indonesia) Christian Hadinata	(Indonesia) Rudy Heryanto (Indonesia) Hariamanto Kartono	9–15, 14–18	(silver) Runner-up
1985	Thailand Open	(Indonesia) Rudy Heryanto	(Denmark) Michael Kjeldsen (Denmark) Mark Christiansen	15–9, 15–8	(gold) Winner
1986	Japan Open	(Indonesia) Rudy Heryanto	(Malaysia) Jalani Sidek (Malaysia) Razif Sidek	11–15, 2–15	(silver) Runner-up
1986	Hong Kong Open	(Indonesia) Rudy Heryanto	(Malaysia) Jalani Sidek (Malaysia) Ong Beng Teong	15–7, 15–6	(gold) Winner
1986	Malaysia Open	(Indonesia) Rudy Heryanto	(Malaysia) Jalani Sidek (Malaysia) Razif Sidek	10–15, 15–11, 10–15	(silver) Runner-up
1987	Singapore Open	(Indonesia) Liem Swie King	(Indonesia) Hadibowo Susanto (Indonesia) Rudy Heryanto	15–2, 15–4	(gold) Winner
1987	All England	(Indonesia) Rudy Heryanto	(China) Li Yongbo (China) Tian Bingyi	9–15, 8–15	(silver) Runner-up
1987	Indonesia Open	(Indonesia) Rudy Heryanto	(Indonesia) Liem Swie King (Indonesia) Eddy Hartono	6–15, 8–15	(silver) Runner-up

Mixed doubles
Year	Tournament	Partner	Opponent	Score	Result
1986	Malaysia Open	(Indonesia) Verawaty Fadjrin	(Denmark) Steen Fladberg (England) Gillian Gilks	15–7, 18–15	(gold) Winner
1988	Indonesia Open	(Indonesia) Verawaty Fadjrin	(Indonesia) Eddy Hartono (Indonesia) Erma Sulistianingsih	9–15, 11–15	(silver) Runner-up

=== International tournaments (1 title, 2 runners-up) ===
Men's doubles
Year	Tournament	Partner	Opponent	Score	Result
1980	Chinese Taipei Open	(Indonesia) Hadibowo Susanto	(Denmark) Flemming Delfs (Denmark) Steen Skovgaard	18–13, 15–5	(gold) Winner
1981	Swedish Open	(Indonesia) Hadibowo Susanto	(Sweden) Thomas Kihlström (Sweden) Stefan Karlsson	6–15, 4–15	(silver) Runner-up
1982	Chinese Taipei Open	(Indonesia) Hadibowo Susanto	(England) Martin Dew (England) Mike Tredgett	6–15, 15–11, 11–15	(silver) Runner-up
