= 2019 BWF World Senior Championships – 55+ =

Tournament details
- Dates: 4 August 2019 – 11 August 2019
- Edition: 9
- Level: International
- Competitors: 219 from 36 nations
- Venue: Spodek
- Location: Katowice, Poland

Champions
- Men's singles: (Norway) Geir Olve Storvik
- Women's singles: (Hong Kong) Zhou Xin
- Men's doubles: (Thailand) Chaiwat Chaloempusitarak (Thailand) Mongkol Gumlaitong
- Women's doubles: (Germany) Ilona Kienitz (Germany) Petra Teichmann
- Mixed doubles: (Sweden) Magnus Nytell (Denmark) Helle Sjørring

These are the results of 2019 BWF World Senior Championships' 55+ events.

== Men's singles ==
=== Seeds ===
1. (Thailand) Pornroj Banditpisut (quarterfinals)
2. (Chinese Taipei) Chang Wen-sung (second round)
3. (Norway) Geir Olve Storvik (gold medalist)
4. (Sweden) Magnus Nytell (quarterfinals)
5. (Denmark) Martin Qvist Olesen (bronze medalist)
6. (Chinese Taipei) Chang Ta-ming (quarterfinals)
7. (India) Harjit Singh (withdrew)
8. (Denmark) Henrik Madsen (third round)
9. (Sweden) Nils Carlson (fourth round)
10. (Germany) Michael Huber (fourth round)
11. (Canada) Jack Keith Priestman (bronze medalist)
12. (India) Ram Lakhan (fourth round)
13. (England) Martin Staden (second round)
14. (France) Jean-Jacques Bontemps (third round)
15. (Sweden) Bengt Mellquist (second round)
16. (Germany) Klaus Buschbeck (third round)

=== Finals ===
Quarterfinals
1	(Thailand) Pronroj Banditpisut	7	6
5	(Denmark) Martin Qvist Olesen	21	21
3	(Norway) Geir Olve Storvik	21	22
6	(Chinese Taipei) Chang Ta-ming	12	20
(Russia) Sergey Razuvaykin	15	21	21
4	(Sweden) Magnus Nytell	21	18	13
(Thailand) Surachai Makkasasithorn	21	18	3^{r}
11	(Canada) Jack Keith Priestman	13	21	3

Semifinals
5	(Denmark) Martin Qvist Olesen	13	6
3	(Norway) Geir Olve Storvik	21	21
(Russia) Sergey Razuvaykin	18	21	21
11	(Canada) Jack Keith Priestman	21	16	11

Final
3	(Norway) Geir Olve Storvik	10	21	21
(Russia) Sergey Razuvaykin	21	14	13

=== Top half ===
==== Section 1 ====
First round

Second round
1	(Thailand) P Banditipisut	21	21
(Finland) T Vailahti	17	9
(Sri Lanka) R Feranando	12	9
(India) A Suresh	21	21
10	(Germany) M Huber	21	21
(Czech Republic) J Dohnal	8	11
(Russia) A Ursov	19	21	17
SUB	(England) R Leigh	21	13	21

Third round
1	(Thailand) P Banditipisut	21	21
(India) A Suresh	14	12
10	(Germany) M Huber	21	21
SUB	(England) R Leigh	10	18

Fourth round
1	(Thailand) P Banditipisut	15	21	21
10	(Germany) M Huber	21	16	11

==== Section 2 ====
First round
(Poland) J Murach	19	19
(Belgium) D Hoefkens	21	21

Second round
5	(Denmark) M Q Olesen	21	21
(Lithuania) A Morkūnas	7	13
(Switzerland) W Stuber	21	21
(South Africa) S Overkott-Brown	13	14
9	(Sweden) N Carlson	21	21	21
(France) B Petrinko	13	23	11
(Japan) N Matsunari	17	19
(Belgium) D Hoefkens	21	21

Third round
5	(Denmark) M Q Olesen	21	21
(Switzerland) W Stuber	4	10
9	(Sweden) N Carlson	21	21
(Belgium) D Hoefkens	9	10

Fourth round
5	(Denmark) M Q Olesen	21	21
9	(Sweden) N Carlson	13	18

==== Section 3 ====
First round
(Scotland) R Gladwin	21	21
(Latvia) M Avotiņš	12	7

Second round
3	(Norway) G O Storvik	21	21
(Ukraine) S Chemerynskyi	10	9
(Finland) H Väisänen	21	21
(France) P Noel	6	5
12	(India) R Lakhan	21	21
(Germany) K Großgebauer	10	13
(Czech Republic) J Jebálek	21	23
(Scotland) R Gladwin	16	21

Third round
3	(Norway) G O Storvik	21	21
(Finland) H Väisänen	17	15
12	(India) R Lakhan	21	21
(Czech Republic) J Jebálek	14	9

Fourth round
3	(Norway) G O Storvik	21	21
12	(India) R Lakhan	19	15

==== Section 4 ====
First round
(Switzerland) U Meier	8	10
(Belgium) R Hoefkens	21	21

Second round
6	(Chinese Taipei) Chang T-m	21	21
(Austria) T Aigner	11	5
(Denmark) J K Tolman	21	21
(England) S Taylor	12	9
15	(Sweden) B Mellquist	16	21	22
(Bahrain) H A M Alabbasi	21	7	24
(Thailand) M Gumlaitong	22	21
(Belgium) R Hoefkens	20	17

Third round
6	(Chinese Taipei) Chang T-m	21	21
(Denmark) J K Tolman	15	14
(Bahrain) H A M Alabbasi	11	21	15
(Thailand) M Gumlaitong	21	19	21

Fourth round
6	(Chinese Taipei) Chang T-m	21	21
(Thailand) M Gumlaitong	13	14

=== Bottom half ===
==== Section 5 ====
First round
(India) R N Sarkar	15	14
(Ukraine) M Stuchynskyi	21	21

Second round
(Ukraine) M Stuchynskyi	19	4
(Russia) S Razuvaykin	21	21
(Switzerland) P Kaul	21	21
13	(England) M Staden	15	14
(Germany) U Lehmann	21	21
(Belarus) S Apanasevich	8	7
(Poland) K Myalski	7	12
8	(Denmark) H Madsen	21	21

Third round
(Russia) S Razuvaykin	20	21	21
(Switzerland) P Kaul	22	19	11
(Germany) U Lehmann	21	13	21
8	(Denmark) H Madsen	18	21	18

Fourth round
(Russia) S Razuvaykin	21	21
(Germany) U Lehmann	17	13

==== Section 6 ====
First round
(Spain) F Ruiz	6	5
(Thailand) T Jaruwat	21	21

Second round
(Thailand) T Jaruwat	21	21
(Austria) E Liska	6	18
(Belgium) B van Peer	4	14
14	(France) J-J Bontemps	21	21
(Finland) J Mikkonen	21	22
(Lithuania) Č Ramanauskas	9	20
(Czech Republic) L Kunášek	12	10
4	(Sweden) M Nytell	21	21

Third round
(Thailand) T Jaruwat	21	10	21
14	(France) J-J Bontemps	14	21	14
(Finland) J Mikkonen	17	11
4	(Sweden) M Nytell	21	21

Fourth round
(Thailand) T Jaruwat	19	23	15
4	(Sweden) M Nytell	21	21	21

==== Section 7 ====
First round
(England) P Carr	10	21	22
(Sweden) P Areskär	21	17	24

Second round
(Sweden) P Areskär	5	6
(Thailand) S Makkasasithorn	21	21
(Republic of Ireland) S Thompson	15	15
16	(Germany) K Buschbeck	21	21
(Moldova) A Bojonca	12	15
(Denmark) J B Petersen	21	21
(Netherlands) M Van Daal	w	/	o
7	(India) H Singh

Third round
(Thailand) S Makkasasithorn	22	21
16	(Germany) K Buschbeck	20	12
(Denmark) J B Petersen	21	26
(Netherlands) M Van Daal	6	24

Fourth round
(Thailand) S Makkasasithorn	w	/	o
(Denmark) J B Petersen

==== Section 8 ====
First round

Second round
(Austria) E Gratz	9	14
(Finland) I Salonen	21	21
(Poland) J Marciniak	8	11
11	(Canada) J K Priestman	21	21
(Japan) T Koizumi	21	21
(France) J-M Edard	15	8
(Czech Republic) K Kundera	w	/	o
2	(Chinese Taipei) Chang W-s

Third round
(Finland) I Salonen	16	15
11	(Canada) J K Priestman	21	21
(Japan) T Koizumi	21	21
(Czech Republic) K Kundera	16	11

Fourth round
11	(Canada) J K Priestman	21	21
(Japan) T Koizumi	12	14

== Women's singles ==
=== Seeds ===
1. (Hong Kong) Zhou Xin (gold medalist)
2. (Germany) Ye Wang (third round)
3. (Republic of Ireland) Sian Williams (third round)
4. (India) Manjusha Sudhir Sahasrabudhe (silver medalist)
5. (Netherlands) Jeannette van der Werff (bronze medalist)
6. (Denmark) Lone Hagelskjær Knudsen (quarterfinals)
7. (England) Cathy Jane Bargh (bronze medalist)
8. (Russia) Irina Shalmanova (third round)

=== Finals ===
Semifinals
1	(Hong Kong) Zhou Xin	23	21
7	(England) Cathy Jane Bargh	21	16
4	(India) Manjusha Sudhir Sahasrabudhe	21	21
5	(Netherlands) Jeannette van der Werff	19	14

Final
1	(Hong Kong) Zhou Xin	14	21	21
4	(India) Manjusha Sudhir Sahasrabudhe	21	13	13

=== Top half ===
==== Section 1 ====
First round

Second round
1	(Hong Kong) Zhou X	21	21
(Poland) E Golańska	10	9
(India) S Satam	18	12
(Germany) E Kämmerer	21	21
6	(Denmark) L H Knudsen	21	21
(France) V Ruche	5	5
(Netherlands) M Kleijwegt-Oskam	21	21
(England) L Eyles	17	12

Third round
1	(Hong Kong) Zhou X	21	21
(Germany) E Kämmerer	15	10
6	(Denmark) L H Knudsen	21	21
(Netherlands) M Kleijwegt-Oskam	7	6

Quarterfinals
1	(Hong Kong) Zhou X	21	21
6	(Denmark) L H Knudsen	12	15

==== Section 2 ====
First round

Second round
3	(Republic of Ireland) S Williams	21	21
(Ukraine) M Prysiazhna	16	11
(Germany) I Kienitz	24	19	21
(France) R Glondu	22	21	3
7	(England) C J Bargh	21	21
(India) S Saggi	7	7
(Portugal) M Rodrigues	10	16
(Russia) L Postnova	21	21

Third round
3	(Republic of Ireland) S Williams	17	20
(Germany) I Kienitz	21	22
7	(England) C J Bargh	21	21
(Russia) L Postnova	10	12

Quarterfinals
(Germany) I Kienitz	12	13
7	(England) C J Bargh	21	21

=== Bottom half ===
==== Section 3 ====
First round
(Netherlands) S Kroon	21	21
(England) S C. Tooke	17	16

Second round
(Netherlands) S Kroon	21	21
(Denmark) B P Skjøt	10	18
(Switzerland) S Lüthi Tripet	12	21	13
8	(Russia) I Shalmanova	21	17	21
(Germany) C Winkler	21	21
(France) I Marrie	13	15
(Poland) M Brzeźnicka	6	13
4	(India) M S Sahasrabudhe	21	21

Third round
(Netherlands) S Kroon	21	21
8	(Russia) I Shalmanova	11	17
(Germany) C Winkler	7	17
4	(India) M S Sahasrabudhe	21	21

Quarterfinals
(Netherlands) S Kroon	18	14
4	(India) M S Sahasrabudhe	21	21

==== Section 4 ====
First round

Second round
(Spain) P Pinto
(India) A Jhaveri	w	/	o
(France) A Bachelard	7	4
5	(Netherlands) J van der Werff	21	21
(Scotland) J Smith	21	21
(England) K Mullen	9	17
(Portugal) A Silva	10	17
2	(Germany) Y Wang	21	21

Third round
(India) A Jhaveri	5	10
5	(Netherlands) J van der Werff	21	21
(Scotland) J Smith	22	23
2	(Germany) Y Wang	20	21

Quarterfinals
5	(Netherlands) J van der Werff	21	21
(Scotland) J Smith	15	16

== Men's doubles ==
=== Seeds ===
1. (Thailand) Surachai Makkasasithorn / Nattapol Sanlekanun (bronze medalists)
2. (Thailand) Pornroj Banditpisut / Bovornovadep Devakula (bronze medalists)
3. (Chinese Taipei) Chang Ta-ming / Chang Wen-sung (withdrew)
4. (Denmark) Morten Christensen / Martin Qvist Olesen (quarterfinals)
5. (Japan) Toru Koizumi / Noriaki Matsunari (third round)
6. (Sweden) Nils Carlson / Bengt Mellquist (third round)
7. (Indonesia) Arnold Dendeng / (Sri Lanka) Rohan Feranando (second round)
8. (Denmark) Jan Bertram Petersen / Jesper Kritter Tolman (quarterfinals)

=== Finals ===
Semifinals
1	(Thailand) Surachai Makkasasithorn (Thailand) Nattapol Sanlekanun
(Thailand) Chaiwat Chaloempusitarak (Thailand) Mongkol Gumlaitong	w	/	o
(Denmark) Henrik Madsen (Norway) Geir Olve Storvik	22	21
2	(Thailand) Pornroj Banditpisut (Thailand) Bovornovadep Devakula	20	19

Final
(Thailand) Chaiwat Chaloempusitarak (Thailand) Mongkol Gumlaitong	21	21
(Denmark) Henrik Madsen (Norway) Geir Olve Storvik	19	17

=== Top half ===
==== Section 1 ====
First round
(Estonia) R Kristel (Estonia) A Raig	10	7
(Austria) E Liska (Republic of Ireland) S Thompson	21	21
(Ukraine) S Chemerynskyi (Ukraine) M Stuchynskyi	7	11
(Scotland) R Gladwin (Scotland) S Thomson	21	21
(Moldova) A Bojonca (Moldova) I Lupu	9	17
(England) R Leigh (England) M Summers	21	21
(Germany) M Fischer (Germany) J Tutas	9	11
(Sweden) L Berglind (Sweden) S Enqvist	21	21
(Lithuania) A Petkevičius (Lithuania) Č Ramanauskas	12	12
(India) S R Gujjula (India) V B B Kalidindi	21	21

Second round
1	(Thailand) S Makkasasithorn (Thailand) N Sanlekanun	21	21
(Austria) E Liska (Republic of Ireland) S Thompson	17	11
(Finland) E Koho (Finland) K Norri	16	12
(Scotland) R Gladwin (Scotland) S Thomson	21	21
8	(Denmark) J B Petersen (Denmark) J K Tolman	21	15	21
(England) R Leigh (England) M Summers	13	21	14
(Sweden) L Berglind (Sweden) S Enqvist	w	/	o
(India) S R Gujjula (India) V B B Kalidindi

Third round
1	(Thailand) S Makkasasithorn (Thailand) N Sanlekanun	21	21
(Scotland) R Gladwin (Scotland) S Thomson	9	7
8	(Denmark) J B Petersen (Denmark) J K Tolman	21	19	21
(Sweden) L Berglind (Sweden) S Enqvist	8	21	16

Quarterfinals
1	(Thailand) S Makkasasithorn (Thailand) N Sanlekanun	21	21
8	(Denmark) J B Petersen (Denmark) J K Tolman	11	12

==== Section 2 ====
First round
(England) A A. Alexander (England) K Nethercott	11	19
(Thailand) C Chaloempusitarak (Thailand) M Gumlaitong	21	21
(Belarus) S Apanasevich (Belarus) S Rutkevich	21	21
(Czech Republic) J Horáček (Czech Republic) K Kundera	12	15
(Finland) T Juvonen (Finland) J Tanttu	21	8	21
(Poland) K Latawski (Poland) K Myalski	14	21	19
(Sweden) M Karlsson (Sweden) M Schwarcz	9	9
(Germany) K Buschbeck (Germany) J Schmitz-Foster	21	21
(Switzerland) U Meier (Switzerland) W Stuber	8	12
(France) P Noel (France) M Piel	21	21

Second round
3	(Chinese Taipei) Chang T-m (Chinese Taipei) Chang W-s
(Thailand) C Chaloempusitarak (Thailand) M Gumlaitong	w	/	o
(India) B Chatterjee (India) Y Sanghavi	21	21
(Belarus) S Apanasevich (Belarus) S Rutkevich	9	12
5	(Japan) T Koizumi (Japan) N Matsunari	21	21
(Finland) T Juvonen (Finland) J Tanttu	13	8
(Germany) K Buschbeck (Germany) J Schmitz-Foster	21	21
(France) P Noel (France) M Piel	10	12

Third round
(Thailand) C Chaloempusitarak (Thailand) M Gumlaitong	11	21	21
(India) B Chatterjee (India) Y Sanghavi	21	12	10
5	(Japan) T Koizumi (Japan) N Matsunari	9	21	11
(Germany) K Buschbeck (Germany) J Schmitz-Foster	21	17	21

Quarterfinals
(Thailand) C Chaloempusitarak (Thailand) M Gumlaitong	18	21	21
(Germany) K Buschbeck (Germany) J Schmitz-Foster	21	13	15

=== Bottom half ===
==== Section 3 ====
First round
(Austria) E Gratz (Austria) R Hofmann	10	4
(Denmark) H Madsen (Norway) G O Storvik	21	21
(Belgium) D Hoefkens (Belgium) B van Peer	21	21
(France) P Fraioli (France) P Victorino	18	17
(Ukraine) O Baranow (Ukraine) V Piddubenko	15	14
SUB	(England) P I Richarson (England) M Staden	21	21
(Poland) A Bunio (Poland) J Ociepa	5	13
(Thailand) T Jaruwat (Thailand) W Kijleatvivat	21	21
(Germany) R Horbach (Germany) D Steger	21	21
(India) S Andrews (India) K C.P.	16	13

Second round
(Denmark) H Madsen (Norway) G O Storvik	21	21
(Belgium) D Hoefkens (Belgium) B van Peer	8	10
SUB	(England) P I Richarson (England) M Staden	12	16
6	(Sweden) N Carlson (Sweden) B Mellquist	21	21
(Thailand) T Jaruwat (Thailand) W Kijleatvivat	21	21
(Finland) R Rantanen (Finland) T Vailahti	9	19
(Germany) R Horbach (Germany) D Steger	12	7
4	(Denmark) M Christensen (Denmark) M Q Olesen	21	21

Third round
(Denmark) H Madsen (Norway) G O Storvik	21	19	21
6	(Sweden) N Carlson (Sweden) B Mellquist	10	21	16
(Thailand) T Jaruwat (Thailand) W Kijleatvivat	21	20	23
4	(Denmark) M Christensen (Denmark) M Q Olesen	14	22	25

Quarterfinals
(Denmark) H Madsen (Norway) G O Storvik	21	16	21
4	(Denmark) M Christensen (Denmark) M Q Olesen	18	21	15

==== Section 4 ====
First round
(Sweden) H Möller (Sweden) Å Pettersson	14	11
(England) I Hunter (England) S Taylor	21	21
(Austria) T Aigner (Czech Republic) J Jebálek	21	17	16
(South Korea) Kim Y-g (South Korea) Yoo I-h	18	21	21
(Germany) T Bunn (Germany) M Schneider	21	21
(Denmark) H Damsbo (Denmark) L Duus	16	13
(France) J-M Edard (France) P Jorssen	12	17
(Finland) J Kekki (Finland) J Niemi	21	21
(Poland) D Kraszewski (Poland) J Marcinlak	w	/	o
(India) R Lakhan (India) H Singh

Second round
(England) I Hunter (England) S Taylor	21	21
(South Korea) Kim Y-g (South Korea) Yoo I-h	13	16
(Germany) T Bunn (Germany) M Schneider	21	21
7	(Indonesia) A Dendeng (Sri Lanka) R Feranando	18	12
(Finland) J Kekki (Finland) J Niemi	21	23
(Czech Republic) J Dohanl (Czech Republic) L Kunášek	15	21
(Poland) D Kraszewski (Poland) J Marcinlak	15	11
2	(Thailand) P Banditpisut (Thailand) B Devakula	21	21

Third round
(England) I Hunter (England) S Taylor	12	15
(Germany) T Bunn (Germany) M Schneider	21	21
(Finland) J Kekki (Finland) J Niemi	16	10
2	(Thailand) P Banditpisut (Thailand) B Devakula	21	21

Quarterfinals
(Germany) T Bunn (Germany) M Schneider	17	21	15
2	(Thailand) P Banditpisut (Thailand) B Devakula	21	9	21

== Women's doubles ==
=== Seeds ===
1. (Germany) Ye Wang / (Hong Kong) Zhou Xin (quarterfinals)
2. (Republic of Ireland) Pamela Peard / Sian Williems (bronze medalists)
3. (England) Christine Summers / Tracy Walker (quarterfinals)
4. (Netherlands) Sandra Kroon / Jeannette van der Werff (silver medalists)

=== Finals ===
Semifinals
(Germany) Ilona Kienitz (Germany) Petra Teichmann	21	21
(Japan) Harumi Marui (Japan) Chizuyo Nitabaru	13	17
4	(Netherlands) Sandra Kroon (Netherlands) Jeannette van der Werff	21	19	21
2	(Republic of Ireland) Pamela Peard (Republic of Ireland) Sian Williams	18	21	19

Final
(Germany) Ilona Kienitz (Germany) Petra Teichmann	21	21
4	(Netherlands) Sandra Kroon (Netherlands) Jeannette van der Werff	17	11

=== Top half ===
==== Section 1 ====
First round
(Russia) L Postnova (Russia) I Shalmanova
(India) A Batra (India) P Lalchandani	w	/	o
(Germany) I Kienitz (Germany) P Teichmann	21	21
(England) K Armer (England) L Eyles	13	11
(France) R Glondu (France) I Marrie	19	21	21
(Sweden) K Kristoffersson (Sweden) J Sandström	21	13	16

Second round
1	(Germany) Y Wang (Hong Kong) Zhou X	21	21
(India) A Batra (India) P Lalchandani	4	8
(Germany) I Kienitz (Germany) P Teichmann	21	22
(France) R Glondu (France) I Marrie	4	20

Quarterfinals
1	(Germany) Y Wang (Hong Kong) Zhou X	17	13
(Germany) I Kienitz (Germany) P Teichmann	21	21

==== Section 2 ====
First round
3	(England) C Summers (England) T Walker	21	21
(Poland) M Brzeźnicka (Poland) E Golańska	14	12
(India) A Nagendra (India) S Swaminathan	18	11
(South Africa) L Fry (Germany) A Lang	21	21
(France) G Deplancke (France) A-d Huynh Vernier	13	5
(Denmark) B Bach Steffensen (Denmark) B P Skjøt	21	21
(Japan) H Marui (Japan) C Nitabaru	21	21
(Germany) E Kämmerer (Germany) C Winniger	18	10

Second round
3	(England) C Summers (England) T Walker	21	21
(South Africa) L Fry (Germany) A Lang	16	8
(Denmark) B Bach Steffensen (Denmark) B P Skjøt	12	21
(Japan) H Marui (Japan) C Nitabaru	21	23

Quarterfinals
3	(England) C Summers (England) T Walker	22	24
(Japan) H Marui (Japan) C Nitabaru	24	21

=== Bottom half ===
==== Section 3 ====
First round
(Denmark) L H Knudsen (Denmark) H Sjørring	21	21
(Portugal) M Rodrigues (Portugal) A Silva	13	5
(India) R Singh (India) P Tandon	10	5
(Switzerland) S Lüthi Tripet (Switzerland) L Schelbert	21	21
(France) M Cornier (France) C Piron	18	18
(Germany) H Bunn (Germany) C Winkler	21	21
(England) C J Bargh (England) V Gillard	18	14
4	(Netherlands) S Kroon (Netherlands) J van der Werff	21	21

Second round
(Denmark) L H Knudsen (Denmark) H Sjørring	21	21
(Switzerland) S Lüthi Tripet (Switzerland) L Schelbert	9	8
(Germany) H Bunn (Germany) C Winkler	12	6
4	(Netherlands) S Kroon (Netherlands) J van der Werff	21	21

Quarterfinals
(Denmark) L H Knudsen (Denmark) H Sjørring	16	20
4	(Netherlands) S Kroon (Netherlands) J van der Werff	21	22

==== Section 4 ====
First round
(South Korea) Kim H-j (South Korea) Seo G-j	11	3
(England) S Coulson (England) P Williams	21	21
(Poland) K Cielecka (Poland) I Sobotka	5	13
(India) S Saggi (India) M S Sahasrabudhe	21	21
(Scotland) J Gladwin Greig (Netherlands) M Kleijwegt-Oskam	21	21
(France) A Bachelard (France) V Ruche	13	10

Second round
(England) S Coulson (England) P Williams	21	21
(India) S Saggi (India) M S Sahasrabudhe	18	17
(Scotland) J Gladwin Greig (Netherlands) M Kleijwegt-Oskam	9	15
2	(Republic of Ireland) P Peard (Republic of Ireland) S Williams	21	21

Quarterfinals
(England) S Coulson (England) P Williams	7	13
2	(Republic of Ireland) P Peard (Republic of Ireland) S Williams	21	21

== Mixed doubles ==
=== Seeds ===
1. (Indonesia) Bobby Ertanto / (Germany) Heidi Bender (bronze medalists)
2. (Chinese Taipei) Chang Wen-sung / Tu Hsiu-hsia (withdrew)
3. (Denmark) Jan Bertram Petersen / (Netherlands) Jeannette van der Werff (bronze medalists)
4. (Sweden) Magnus Nytell / (Denmark) Helle Sjørring (gold medalists)
5. (Republic of Ireland) Graham Henderson / Pamela Peard (quarterfinals)
6. (England) Gene Austin Joyner / Launa Eyles (second round)
7. (Scotland) Steven Thomson / Jill Smith (quarterfinals)
8. (India) Ram Lakhan / Manjusha Sudhir Sahasrabudhe (quarterfinals)

=== Finals ===
Semifinals
1	(Indonesia) Bobby Ertanto (Germany) Heidi Bender	20	21	17
4	(Sweden) Magnus Nytell (Denmark) Helle Sjørring	22	16	21
3	(Denmark) Jan Bertram Petersen (Netherlands) Jeannette van der Werff	14	18
(Germany) Jürgen Schmitz-Foster (Germany) Petra Teichmann	21	21

Final
4	(Sweden) Magnus Nytell (Denmark) Helle Sjørring	21	21
(Germany) Jürgen Schmitz-Foster (Germany) Petra Teichmann	14	12

=== Top half ===
==== Section 1 ====
First round
(South Africa) S Overkott-Brown (South Africa) L Fry	8	11
(Thailand) S Choeysoongnern (Thailand) D Bunnag	21	21
(India) H Singh (India) N Pasricha
(Sweden) S Enqvist (Sweden) K Kristoffersson	w	/	o
(Belgium) D Hoefkens (Hong Kong) Zhou X	21	21
(Poland) J Ociepa (Poland) I Sobotka	5	19

Second round
1	(Indonesia) B Ertanto (Germany) H Bender	21	21
(Lithuania) A Morkūnas (Lithuania) R Ambrasienė	13	8
(France) M Piel (France) A-d Huynh Vernier	8	21
(Thailand) S Choeysoongnern (Thailand) D Bunnag	21	23
6	(England) G A Joyner (England) L Eyles	21	14	29
(Sweden) S Enqvist (Sweden) K Kristoffersson	12	21	30
(Austria) E Liska (Portugal) M Rodrigues	14	16
(Belgium) D Hoefkens (Hong Kong) Zhou X	21	21

Third round
1	(Indonesia) B Ertanto (Germany) H Bender	21	21
(Thailand) S Choeysoongnern (Thailand) D Bunnag	10	3
(Sweden) S Enqvist (Sweden) K Kristoffersson	21	12	16
(Belgium) D Hoefkens (Hong Kong) Zhou X	16	21	21

Quarterfinals
1	(Indonesia) B Ertanto (Germany) H Bender	21	21
(Belgium) D Hoefkens (Hong Kong) Zhou X	12	16

==== Section 2 ====
First round
(Spain) F Ruiz (Spain) P Pinto	9	9
(Netherlands) M Van Daal (Switzerland) L Schelbert	21	21
(Finland) J Kekki (Finland) R Tuomela	15	2
(France) P Noel (France) I Marrie	21	21
(England) C Hufflett (England) D Hufflett	25	15
(Japan) T Koizumi (Japan) H Marui	27	21
(India) S R Gujjula (India) K Vijayanand	18	19
(South Korea) Hong S-g (South Korea) Yu G-s	21	21

Second round
4	(Sweden) M Nytell (Denmark) H Sjørring	21	21
(Netherlands) M Van Daal (Switzerland) L Schelbert	14	14
(Germany) K Buschbeck (Germany) I Kienitz	21	15	21
(France) P Noel (France) I Marrie	12	21	14
7	(Scotland) S Thomson (Scotland) J Smith	21	21
(Japan) T Koizumi (Japan) H Marui	19	14
(Russia) S Razuvaykin (Russia) L Postnova	21	21
(South Korea) Hong S-g (South Korea) Yu G-s	7	7

Third round
4	(Sweden) M Nytell (Denmark) H Sjørring	21	21
(Germany) K Buschbeck (Germany) I Kienitz	8	13
7	(Scotland) S Thomson (Scotland) J Smith	21	21
(Russia) S Razuvaykin (Russia) L Postnova	16	7

Quarterfinals
4	(Sweden) M Nytell (Denmark) H Sjørring	21	16	21
7	(Scotland) S Thomson (Scotland) J Smith	15	21	18

=== Bottom half ===
==== Section 3 ====
First round
(Netherlands) R Paap (Netherlands) M Kleijwegt-Oskam	12	21	21
(France) P Combes (France) N Combes	21	14	18
(Scotland) R Gladwin (Netherlands) S Kroon	21	21
(Germany) K Großgebauer (Germany) A Lang	16	19
(South Korea) Kim Y-g (South Korea) Seo G-j	11	20
(Poland) S Wikło (Poland) M Brzeźnicka	21	22
(Sweden) P Areskär (Sweden) J Sandström	11	11
(England) I Hunter (England) L Pearcy	21	21

Second round
(Netherlands) R Paap (Netherlands) M Kleijwegt-Oskam	21	21
(Ukraine) S Chemerynskyi (Ukraine) M Prysiazhna	10	16
(Scotland) R Gladwin (Netherlands) S Kroon	13	21	17
8	(India) R Lakhan (India) M S Sahasrabudhe	21	19	21
(Poland) S Wikło (Poland) M Brzeźnicka	21	21
(Switzerland) U Meier (Switzerland) S Lüthi Tripet	13	7
(England) I Hunter (England) L Pearcy	8	14
3	(Denmark) J B Petersen (Netherlands) J van der Werff	21	21

Third round
(Netherlands) R Paap (Netherlands) M Kleijwegt-Oskam	13	16
8	(India) R Lakhan (India) M S Sahasrabudhe	21	21
(Poland) S Wikło (Poland) M Brzeźnicka	1	8
3	(Denmark) J B Petersen (Netherlands) J van der Werff	21	21

Quarterfinals
8	(India) R Lakhan (India) M S Sahasrabudhe	21	8	16
3	(Denmark) J B Petersen (Netherlands) J van der Werff	18	21	21

==== Section 4 ====
First round
(Denmark) H Damsbo (Denmark) B P Skjøt	14	14
(England) K Nethercott (England) T Walker	21	21
(Thailand) W Kijleatvivat (Thailand) T Phosri	21	21
(France) J-M Edard (France) C Piron	9	11
(Sweden) N Carlson (Russia) I Shalmanova	21	17	21
(India) A George Regis Mary (India) L Joseph	16	21	16

Second round
(England) K Nethercott (England) T Walker	21	21
(Ukraine) O Baranow (Luxembourg) C Kasel	7	7
(Thailand) W Kijleatvivat (Thailand) T Phosri	15	18
5	(Republic of Ireland) G Henderson (Republic of Ireland) P Peard	21	21
(Sweden) N Carlson (Russia) I Shalmanova	21	21
(Japan) N Matsunari (Japan) C Nitabaru	15	8
(Germany) J Schmitz-Foster (Germany) P Teichmann	21	21
SUB	(Chinese Taipei) Chang T-m (Chinese Taipei) Tu H-h	13	16

Third round
(England) K Nethercott (England) T Walker	15	17
5	(Republic of Ireland) G Henderson (Republic of Ireland) P Peard	21	21
(Sweden) N Carlson (Russia) I Shalmanova	20	7
(Germany) J Schmitz-Foster (Germany) P Teichmann	22	21

Quarterfinals
5	(Republic of Ireland) G Henderson (Republic of Ireland) P Peard	11	16
(Germany) J Schmitz-Foster (Germany) P Teichmann	21	21
