= 2017 BWF World Senior Championships =

Tournament details
- Dates: 11 – 17 September
- Edition: 8th
- Level: International
- Competitors: 663 from 39 nations
- Venue: Rajiv Gandhi Indoor Stadium
- Location: Kochi, India

The 2017 BWF World Senior Championships is a badminton tournament which was held from 11 to 17 September at Rajiv Gandhi Indoor Stadium in Kochi, India.

== Players ==
663 players from 39 countries participated this edition of championships.

- Australia (3)
- Austria (6)
- Bahrain (1)
- Bangladesh (8)
- Belgium (3)
- Brunei (3)
- Canada (5)
- Chinese Taipei (2)
- Croatia (1)
- Czech Republic (3)
- Denmark (29)
- England (68)
- Finland (1)
- France (39)
- Germany (39)
- Greece (1)
- Hong Kong (3)
- Hungary (4)
- India (178) (H)
- Indonesia (15)
- Ireland (3)
- Israel (1)
- Japan (48)
- Malaysia (23)
- Nepal (1)
- Norway (9)
- Poland (5)
- Russia (32)
- Scotland (3)
- Singapore (2)
- Slovenia (1)
- South Africa (2)
- South Korea (1)
- Spain (3)
- Sri Lanka (24)
- Sweden (33)
- Switzerland (11)
- Thailand (43)
- Uzbekistan (6)

== Medal summary ==
=== Medal table ===
* Host nation (India)

Rank	Nation	Gold	Silver	Bronze	Total
1	England	10.5	6.5	13.5	30.5
2	Thailand	5	4	5	14
3	Russia	5	1.5	2	8.5
4	Japan	4	6	16	26
5	Germany	4	3.5	5	12.5
6	Denmark	2	2.5	3	7.5
7	India*	1	4	16	21
8	Scotland	1	2.5	0	3.5
9	Canada	1	2	1	4
10	Hong Kong	1	0.5	0	1.5
10	Hungary	1	0.5	0	1.5
12	South Africa	1	0	0.5	1.5
13	Chinese Taipei	1	0	0	1
14	Malaysia	0.5	1	4	5.5
15	Sri Lanka	0	2	1	3
16	Ireland	0	1.5	0	1.5
17	Poland	0	1	1	2
18	Sweden	0	0.5	5	5.5
19	Austria	0	0.5	0	0.5
20	Finland	0	0	1.5	1.5
21	Australia	0	0	1	1
21	France	0	0	1	1
21	Netherlands	0	0	1	1
21	Uzbekistan	0	0	1	1
25	Norway	0	0	0.5	0.5
26	Indonesia	0	0	0	0
Totals (26 entries)		38	40	79	157

=== Medalists ===
Event	Gold	Silver	Bronze
35+
Men's singles	(Russia) Stanislav Pukhov	(Thailand) Naruenart Chuaymak	(Germany) Felix Hoffmann
Men's singles	(Russia) Stanislav Pukhov	(Thailand) Naruenart Chuaymak	(India) Nikhil Kanetkar
Women's singles	(Russia) Olga Arkhangelskaya	(Russia) Maria Koloskova	(Japan) Rie Matsumoto
Women's singles	(Russia) Olga Arkhangelskaya	(Russia) Maria Koloskova	(Japan) Noriko Sanada
Men's doubles	(India) Rupesh Kumar K. T. (India) Sanave Thomas	(India) J. B. S. Vidyadhar (India) Valiyaveetil Diju	(Thailand) Naruenart Chuaymak (Thailand) Thitipong Lapoe
Men's doubles	(India) Rupesh Kumar K. T. (India) Sanave Thomas	(India) J. B. S. Vidyadhar (India) Valiyaveetil Diju	(Japan) Hosemari Fujimoto (Japan) Matsumoto Masayuki
Women's doubles	(Russia) Olga Arkhangelskaya (Russia) Maria Koloskova	(Japan) Rie Matsumoto (Japan) Noriko Sanada	(England) Mhairi Armstrong (England) Suzanne Brewer
Women's doubles	(Russia) Olga Arkhangelskaya (Russia) Maria Koloskova	(Japan) Rie Matsumoto (Japan) Noriko Sanada	(Germany) Miriam Mantell (Germany) Claudia Vogelgsang
Mixed doubles	(Russia) Stanislav Pukhov (Russia) Maria Koloskova	(Germany) Felix Hoffmann (Germany) Claudia Vogelgsang	(India) Abhinand K. Shetty (India) K. Neelima Choudhary
Mixed doubles	(Russia) Stanislav Pukhov (Russia) Maria Koloskova	(Germany) Felix Hoffmann (Germany) Claudia Vogelgsang	(Denmark) Morten Eilby Rasmussen (England) Lynn Swan
40+
Men's singles	(Japan) Hosemari Fujimoto	(India) K. A. Aneesh	(India) Joy T. Antony
Men's singles	(Japan) Hosemari Fujimoto	(India) K. A. Aneesh	(India) C. M. Shashidhar
Women's singles	(Germany) Claudia Vogelgsang	(Sri Lanka) Chandrika de Silva	(Uzbekistan) Yana Katerinich
Women's singles	(Germany) Claudia Vogelgsang	(Sri Lanka) Chandrika de Silva	(England) Rebecca Pantaney
Men's doubles	(Thailand) Phongthep Imkaew (Thailand) Worapoj Somchariya	(Malaysia) Kah Kok Cheong (Malaysia) Lum Chee Meng	(India) Jaseel P. Ismail (India) Jaison Xavier
Men's doubles	(Thailand) Phongthep Imkaew (Thailand) Worapoj Somchariya	(Malaysia) Kah Kok Cheong (Malaysia) Lum Chee Meng	(India) Deepak Amarnath (India) Ajit Wijetilekk
Women's doubles	(England) Louise Culyer (Denmark) Dorte Steenberg	(England) Olga Bryant (Russia) Olga Kuznetsova	(India) Supriya Devgun (India) Nancy Tandon
Women's doubles	(England) Louise Culyer (Denmark) Dorte Steenberg	(England) Olga Bryant (Russia) Olga Kuznetsova	(England) Rebecca Pantaney (England) Lynne Swan
Mixed doubles	(Denmark) Carsten Loesch (Denmark) Dorte Steenberg	(England) Carl Jennings (England) Joanne Muggeridge	(Japan) Hosemari Fujimoto (Japan) Ayumi Takakura
Mixed doubles	(Denmark) Carsten Loesch (Denmark) Dorte Steenberg	(England) Carl Jennings (England) Joanne Muggeridge	(Russia) Vadim Nazarov (Russia) Olga Kuznetsova
45+
Men's singles	(Chinese Taipei) Wu Chang-jun	(Denmark) Carsten Loesch	(Sweden) Ulf Svensson
Men's singles	(Chinese Taipei) Wu Chang-jun	(Denmark) Carsten Loesch	(India) Jaison Xavier
Women's singles	(Hungary) Gondáné Fórián Csilla	(Poland) Dorota Grzejdak	(England) Caroline Hale
Women's singles	(Hungary) Gondáné Fórián Csilla	(Poland) Dorota Grzejdak	(Germany) Marika Wippich
Men's doubles	(Thailand) Chatchai Boonmee (Thailand) Wittaya Panomchai	(India) Srikant Bakshi (India) Navdeep Singh	(Thailand) Teerachai Jaruwat (Thailand) Yodchay Laothoedpong
Men's doubles	(Thailand) Chatchai Boonmee (Thailand) Wittaya Panomchai	(India) Srikant Bakshi (India) Navdeep Singh	(Sweden) Stefan Edvardsson (Sweden) Ulf Svensson
Women's doubles	(England) Tracey Middleton (England) Joanne Muggeridge	(Germany) Tanja Eberl (Germany) Marika Wippich	(Denmark) Hanne Bertelsen (England) Caroline Hale
Women's doubles	(England) Tracey Middleton (England) Joanne Muggeridge	(Germany) Tanja Eberl (Germany) Marika Wippich	(India) Sangeeta Rajgopalan (India) Poonam Tatwawadi
Mixed doubles	(England) Nick Ponting (England) Julie Bradbury	(Sweden) Patrik Bjorkler (Hungary) Gondáné Fórián Csilla	(Thailand) Teerachai Jaruwat (Thailand) Puangthip Kaosamaang
Mixed doubles	(England) Nick Ponting (England) Julie Bradbury	(Sweden) Patrik Bjorkler (Hungary) Gondáné Fórián Csilla	(Sweden) Stefan Edvardsson (Denmark) Hanne Bertelsen
50+
Men's singles	(Thailand) Karoon Kasayapanan	(Thailand) Narong Vanichitsarakul	(Indonesia) Edi Ismanto
Men's singles	(Thailand) Karoon Kasayapanan	(Thailand) Narong Vanichitsarakul	(India) Murli Subramaniam
Women's singles	(Hong Kong) Zhou Xin	(Germany) Tanja Eberi	(England) Betty Blair
Women's singles	(Hong Kong) Zhou Xin	(Germany) Tanja Eberi	(Germany) Ye Wang
Men's doubles	(Indonesia) Bobby Ertanto (Malaysia) Ting Wei Ping	(Republic of Ireland) Graham Henderson (Republic of Ireland) Mark Topping	(India) Bhushan Akut (India) George Thomas
Men's doubles	(Indonesia) Bobby Ertanto (Malaysia) Ting Wei Ping	(Republic of Ireland) Graham Henderson (Republic of Ireland) Mark Topping	(Thailand) Mongokol Gumlaitong (Thailand) Karoon Kasayapanan
Women's doubles	(England) Betty Blair (England) Debora Miller	(Germany) Ye Wang (Hong Kong) Zhou Xin	(India) Kavita Dixit (India) Suzanne Venglet
Women's doubles	(England) Betty Blair (England) Debora Miller	(Germany) Ye Wang (Hong Kong) Zhou Xin	(Netherlands) Grace Kakiay (Norway) Berit Thyness
Mixed doubles	(Indonesia) Alexander Tandun (Indonesia) Rosiana Tendean	(Republic of Ireland) Mark Topping (England) Debora Miller	(Sweden) Erik Soderberg (Sweden) Anki Gunners
Mixed doubles	(Indonesia) Alexander Tandun (Indonesia) Rosiana Tendean	(Republic of Ireland) Mark Topping (England) Debora Miller	(Sweden) Magnus Nytell (Netherlands) Grace Kakiay
55+
Men's singles	(Thailand) Pornroj Banditpisut	(India) Basant Kumar Soni	(India) Harjit Singh
Men's singles	(Thailand) Pornroj Banditpisut	(India) Basant Kumar Soni	(Australia) Loke Poh Wong
Women's singles	(Germany) Heidi Bender	(England) Sue Sheen	(India) Manjusha Sudhir Sahasrabudhe
Women's singles	(Germany) Heidi Bender	(England) Sue Sheen	(Japan) Kuniko Yamamoto
Men's doubles	(Thailand) Pornroj Banditpisut (Thailand) Nattapol Sanlekanun	(England) Eric Plane (England) Roger Taylor	(Thailand) Bovornovadep Devakula (Thailand) Chongsak Suvanich
Men's doubles	(Thailand) Pornroj Banditpisut (Thailand) Nattapol Sanlekanun	(England) Eric Plane (England) Roger Taylor	(Denmark) Per Juul (Sweden) Bengt Meliquist
Women's doubles	(Denmark) Birte Bach Steffensen (Germany) Heidi Bender	(Japan) Miyoko Sato (Japan) Kuniko Yamamoto	(Russia) Liudmila Postnova (Russia) Irina Shalmanova
Women's doubles	(Denmark) Birte Bach Steffensen (Germany) Heidi Bender	(Japan) Miyoko Sato (Japan) Kuniko Yamamoto	(England) Sue Sheen (England) Susan C. Tooke
Mixed doubles	(Indonesia) Bobby Ertanto (Germany) Heidi Bender	(Thailand) Bovornovadep Devakula (Thailand) Juthatop Banjongsilp	(Japan) Noriaki Matsunari (Japan) Miyoko Sato
Mixed doubles	(Indonesia) Bobby Ertanto (Germany) Heidi Bender	(Thailand) Bovornovadep Devakula (Thailand) Juthatop Banjongsilp	(Sweden) Bengt Meliquist (England) Sue Sheen
60+
Men's singles	(Scotland) Dan Travers	(Sri Lanka) Arnold Dendeng	(Malaysia) Chan Wan Seong
Men's singles	(Scotland) Dan Travers	(Sri Lanka) Arnold Dendeng	(Malaysia) Ong Then Lin
Women's singles	(England) Christine M. Crossley	(Scotland) Christine Black	(Japan) Sugako Morita
Women's singles	(England) Christine M. Crossley	(Scotland) Christine Black	(Japan) Sayoko Takebayashi
Men's doubles	(Russia) Sergey Bushuev (Russia) Vladimir Koloskov	(Austria) Tariq Farooq (Denmark) Karsten Meier	(Japan) Tadao Aoyama (Japan) Toshio Kawaguchi
Men's doubles	(Russia) Sergey Bushuev (Russia) Vladimir Koloskov	(Austria) Tariq Farooq (Denmark) Karsten Meier	(England) John Kindred (England) Ian M. Purton
Women's doubles	(Japan) Sugako Morita (Japan) Sayoko Takebayashi	(Scotland) Christine Black (England) Christine M. Crossley	(England) Anna Bowskill (England) Sylvia Penn
Women's doubles	(Japan) Sugako Morita (Japan) Sayoko Takebayashi	(Scotland) Christine Black (England) Christine M. Crossley	(Canada) Siew Har Hong (Canada) Marcia Jackson
Mixed doubles	(England) Ian M. Purton (England) Christine M. Crossley	(Scotland) Dan Travers (Scotland) Christine Black	(Japan) Toshio Kawaguchi (Japan) Sayoko Takebayashi
Mixed doubles	(England) Ian M. Purton (England) Christine M. Crossley	(Scotland) Dan Travers (Scotland) Christine Black	(England) Robin Wells (England) Janet B. Williams
65+
Men's singles	(South Africa) Johan Croukamp	(Canada) Henry Paynter	(India) Hubert Miranda
Men's singles	(South Africa) Johan Croukamp	(Canada) Henry Paynter	(Finland) Carl-Johan Nybergh
Women's singles	(England) Betty Bartlett	(Canada) Siew Har Hong	(Japan) Yuriko Okemoto
Women's singles	(England) Betty Bartlett	(Canada) Siew Har Hong	(Japan) Chizuko Oketani
Men's doubles	(England) Peter Emptage (England) Graham Holt	(Thailand) Somrak Arnamwat (Thailand) Chaiwat Hanthanom	(India) Sushil Kumar Patet (India) Surendra Singh Pundir
Men's doubles	(England) Peter Emptage (England) Graham Holt	(Thailand) Somrak Arnamwat (Thailand) Chaiwat Hanthanom	(South Africa) Johan Croukamp (Finland) Carl-Johan Nybergh
Women's doubles	(England) Betty Bartlett (England) Eileen M. Carley	(Japan) Haruko Asakoshi (Japan) Yasuko Kataito	(Japan) Sumiko Kaneko (Japan) Yuriko Okemoto
Women's doubles	(England) Betty Bartlett (England) Eileen M. Carley	(Japan) Haruko Asakoshi (Japan) Yasuko Kataito	(Japan) Fumiko Sakuma (Japan) Masai Suzuki
Mixed doubles	(Canada) Henry Paynter (Canada) Siew Har Hong	(Denmark) Christian Hansen (Denmark) Gitte Attle Rasmussen	(England) Peter Emptage (England) Betty Bartlett
Mixed doubles	(Canada) Henry Paynter (Canada) Siew Har Hong	(Denmark) Christian Hansen (Denmark) Gitte Attle Rasmussen	(Sri Lanka) Frirs Mainaky (Sri Lanka) Rohini Jaywardena
70+
Men's singles	(England) Jim Garrett	(Japan) Yoshio Terasaki	(Malaysia) Foo Lai Loon
Men's singles	(England) Jim Garrett	(Japan) Yoshio Terasaki	(Poland) Paweł Gasz
Women's singles	(Germany) Elvira Richter	(Japan) Sumiko Kaneko	(France) Viviane Bonnay
Women's singles	(Germany) Elvira Richter	(Japan) Sumiko Kaneko	(Japan) Satoko Nakamura
Men's doubles	(Japan) Akira Hirota (Japan) Shinjiro Matsuda	(England) Jim Garrett (England) Ray Sharp	(Japan) Masaki Furuhashi (Japan) Yoshio Terasaki
Men's doubles	(Japan) Akira Hirota (Japan) Shinjiro Matsuda	(England) Jim Garrett (England) Ray Sharp	(Malaysia) Ching Kon Kong (Malaysia) Loo Ah Hooi
Women's doubles	(Japan) Sumiko Ishikawa (Japan) Satoko Nakamura	(England) Beryl Goodall (England) Mary Jenner	(England) Susan Awcock (England) Victoria Betts
Women's doubles	(Japan) Sumiko Ishikawa (Japan) Satoko Nakamura	(England) Beryl Goodall (England) Mary Jenner	(Germany) Elvira Richter (Germany) Elisabeth Schonfeld
Mixed doubles	(England) Jim Garrett (England) Susan Awcock	(Japan) Masaki Furuhashi (Japan) Sumiko Kaneko	(England) Roger Baldwin (England) Victoria Betts
Mixed doubles	(England) Jim Garrett (England) Susan Awcock	(Japan) Masaki Furuhashi (Japan) Sumiko Kaneko	(Denmark) Knud Danielsen (Denmark) Margrethe Danielsen

=== Players who won multiple medals ===
Rank	Player	1st place, gold medalist(s)	2nd place, silver medalist(s)	3rd place, bronze medalist(s)	Total
1	(Germany) Heidi Bender	3	0	0	3
2	(England) Christine M Crossley	2	1	0	3
2	(England) Jim Garrett	2	1	0	3
2	(Russia) Maria Koloskova	2	1	0	3
6	(England) Betty Bartlett	2	0	1	3
7	(Denmark) Dorte Steenberg	2	0	0	2
7	(Indonesia) Bobby Ertanto	2	0	0	2
7	(Russia) Olga Arkhangelskaya	2	0	0	2
7	(Russia) Stanislav Pukhov	2	0	0	2
7	(Thailand) Pornroj Banditpisut	2	0	0	2
12	(Canada) Siew Har Hong	1	1	1	3
12	(Germany) Claudia Vogelgsang	1	1	1	3
14	(Canada) Henry Paynter	1	1	0	2
14	(Denmark) Carsten Loesch	1	1	0	2
14	(England) Debora Miller	1	1	0	2
14	(England) Joanne Muggeridge	1	1	0	2
14	(Hong Kong) Zhou Xin	1	1	0	2
14	(Hungary) Gondáné Fórián Csilla	1	1	0	2
14	(Scotland) Dan Travers	1	1	0	2
21	(Japan) Sayoko Takebayashi	1	0	2	3
22	(England) Betty Blair	1	0	1	1
22	(England) Ian M Purton	1	0	1	2
22	(England) Peter Emptage	1	0	1	2
22	(England) Susan Awcock	1	0	1	2
22	(Germany) Elvira Richter	1	0	1	2
22	(Japan) Satoko Nakamura	1	0	1	2
22	(Japan) Sugako Morita	1	0	1	2
22	(South Africa) Johan Croukamp	1	0	1	2
22	(Thailand) Karoon Kasayapanan	1	0	1	2
31	(Scotland) Christine Black	0	3	0	3
32	(Japan) Sumiko Kaneko	0	2	1	3
33	(Germany) Tanja Eberl	0	2	0	2
33	(Republic of Ireland) Mark Topping	0	2	0	2
35	(England) Sue Sheen	0	1	2	3
35	(Japan) Hosemari Fujimoto	0	1	2	3
37	(Germany) Felix Hoffmann	0	1	1	2
37	(Germany) Marika Wippich	0	1	1	2
37	(Germany) Ye Wang	0	1	1	2
37	(Japan) Kuniko Yamamoto	0	1	1	2
37	(Japan) Masaki Furuhashi	0	1	1	2
37	(Japan) Miyoko Sato	0	1	1	2
37	(Japan) Noriko Sanada	0	1	1	2
37	(Japan) Rie Matsumoto	0	1	1	2
37	(Japan) Yoshio Terasaki	0	1	1	2
37	(Russia) Olga Kuznetsova	0	1	1	2
37	(Thailand) Bovornovadep Devakula	0	1	1	2
37	(Thailand) Naruenart Chuaymak	0	1	1	2
49	(Denmark) Hanne Bertelsen	0	0	2	2
49	(England) Caroline Hale	0	0	2	2
49	(England) Rebecca Pantaney	0	0	2	2
49	(England) Victoria Betts	0	0	2	2
49	(Finland) Carl-Johan Nybergh	0	0	2	2
49	(India) Jaison Xavier	0	0	2	2
49	(Japan) Toshio Kawaguchi	0	0	2	2
49	(Japan) Yuriko Okemoto	0	0	2	2
49	(Netherlands) Grace Kakiay	0	0	2	2
49	(Sweden) Bengt Meliquist	0	0	2	2
49	(Sweden) Stefan Edvardsson	0	0	2	2
49	(Sweden) Ulf Svensson	0	0	2	2
49	(Thailand) Teerachai Jaruwat	0	0	2	2
