= Rajiv Gandhi Indoor Stadium =

Indoor stadium at Kochi, India

Coordinates: 9°58′6.51″N 76°17′53.81″E

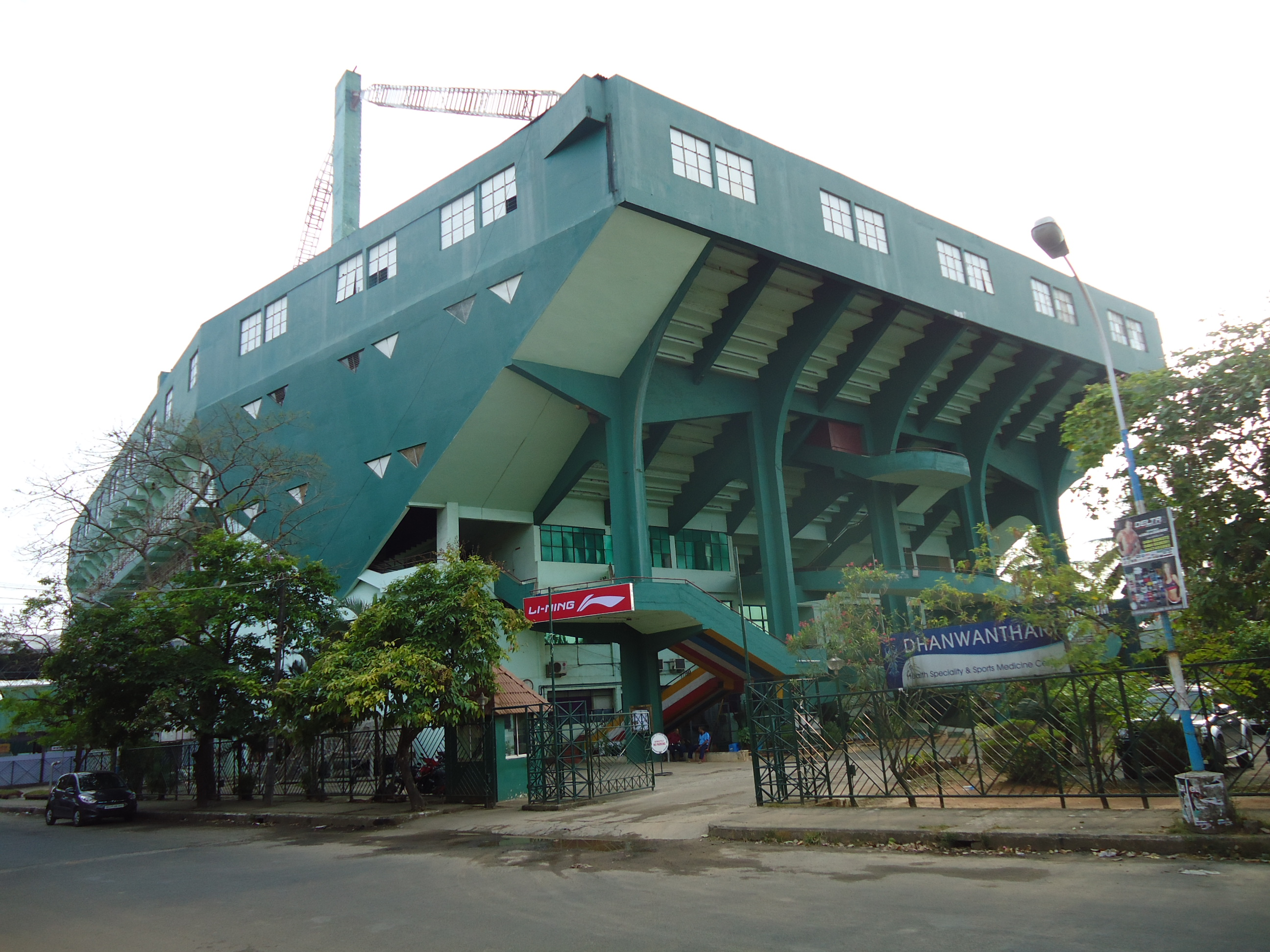
- Interactive map of Rajiv Gandhi Indoor Stadium
- Location: Kadavanthra, Kochi, Kerala
- Owner: Regional Sports Centre
- Operator: Regional Sports Centre
- Capacity: 10,000
- Surface: Maple floor

Construction
- Opened: 1993

Website
- Official website

Regional Sports Centre, also known as Rajiv Gandhi Indoor Stadium, is a multipurpose sports centre in Kadavanthra, Kochi, Kerala, India.

The stadium is situated in 4 acres (16,000 m^{2}) of land, the centre has the facilities for badminton, tennis, basketball, table tennis, swimming, billiards and indoor cricket.

This indoor stadium has a capacity of 10,000 persons and is named after former Indian Prime Minister Rajiv Gandhi.

Indoor tennis complex has four synthetic courts with modern technology. It was inaugurated in 2000 by Padma Bhushan Ramanathan Krishnan.
