= Sports in Karnataka =

Sports in Indian state

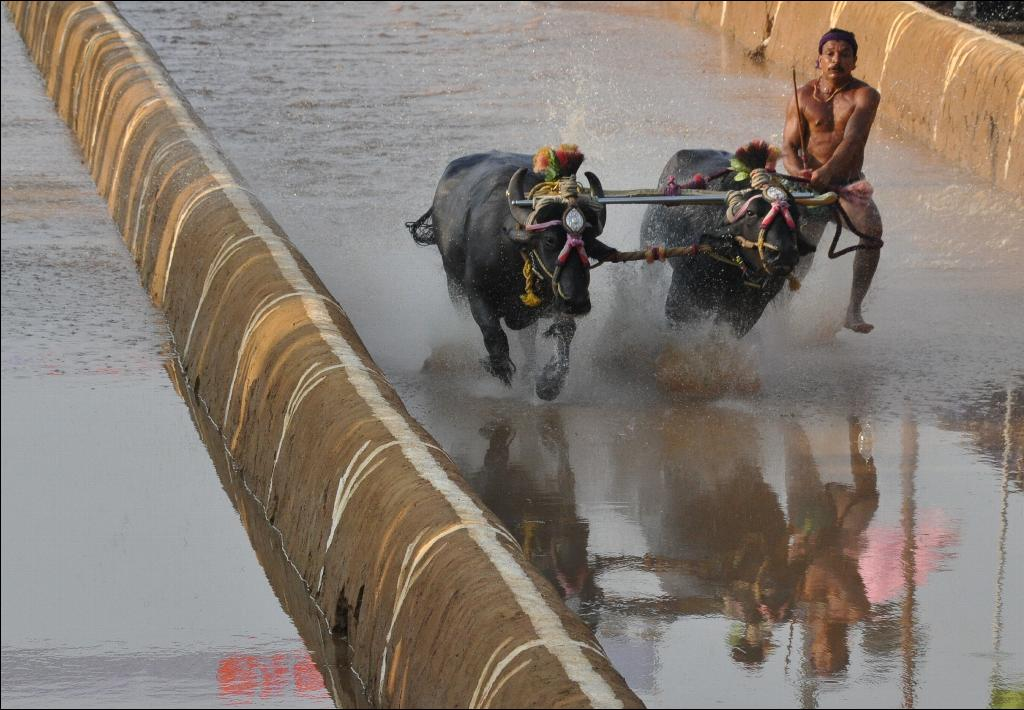
Kambala, a traditional bull-race competition, at Pilikula Nisargadhama

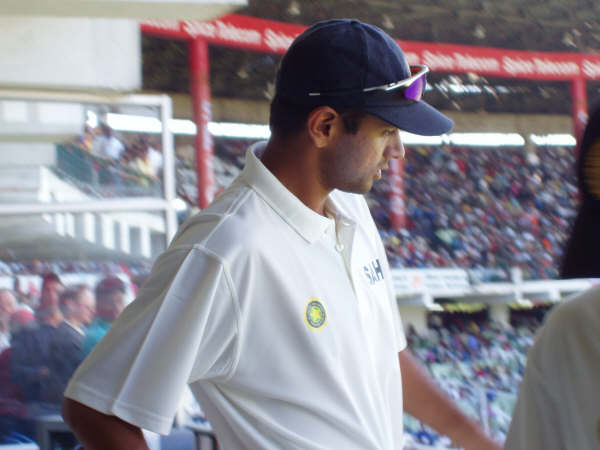
Rahul Dravid, the former captain of the Indian cricket team also represented Karnataka in the Ranji Trophy

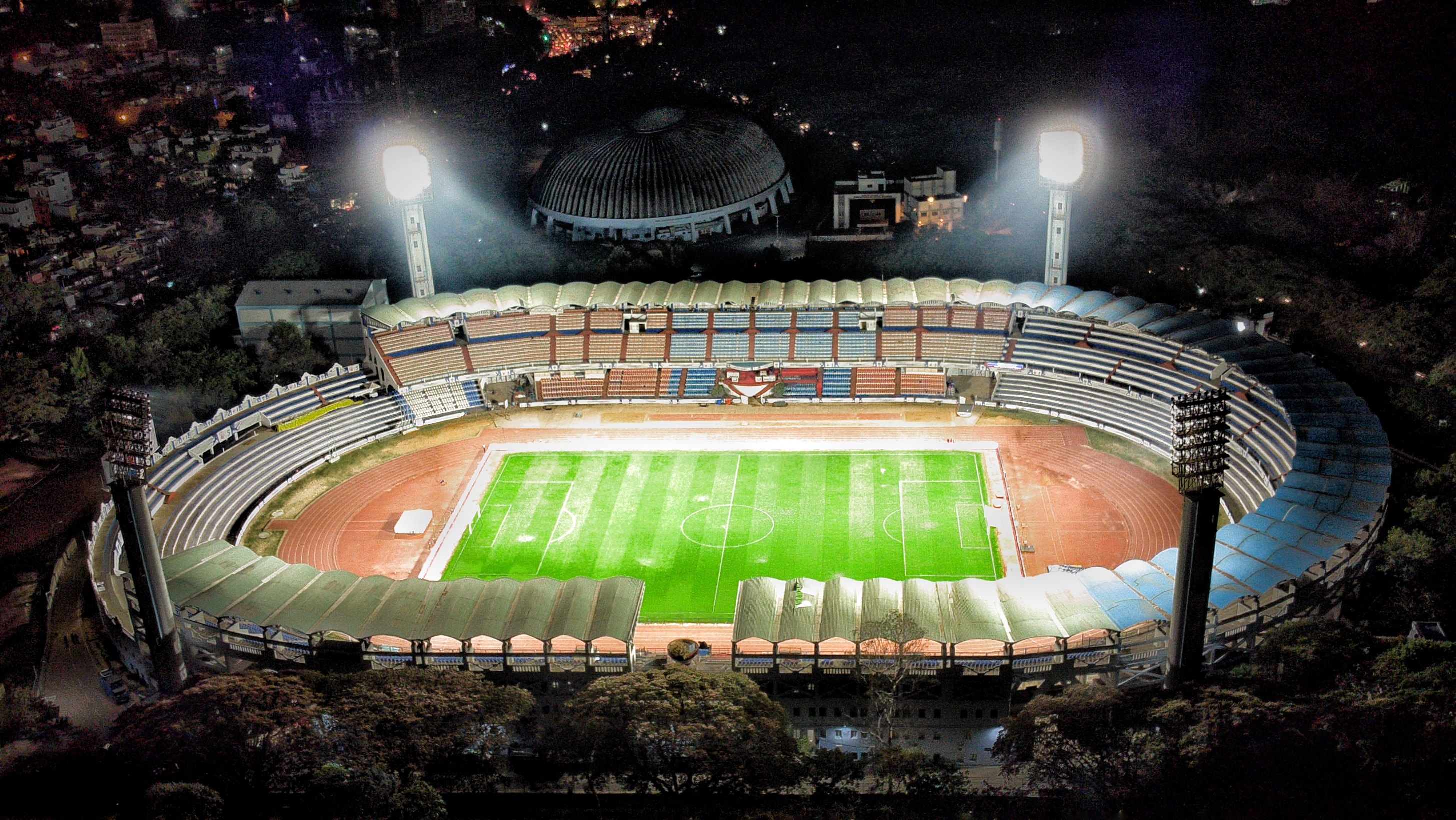
Aerial view of Sree Kanteerava Stadium, which serves as multi-sport venue for the city.

Sports in Karnataka feature a wide variety of traditional as well as modern olympic sports, played across the Indian state of Karnataka. Cricket is by far the most popular sport in the state with International cricket matches attracting a sizeable number of spectators. The sports infrastructure is mainly concentrated in the state's capital city of Bengaluru, which also played co-host to the 4th National Games of India in the year 1997 with Mysuru. The city also hosts Sports Authority of India (SAI), the premier sports institute in India.

Other than cricket, the state has produced national and international athletes and has been a major center for Badminton, Hockey, Football, Chess, Cue sports, Athletics, swimming and indigenous sports such as Hori Habba and Kambala. Karnataka is sometimes referred to as the cradle of Indian swimming thanks to a strong swimming culture and having won multiple gold medals at the National Games.

== History ==
=== Ancient and Medieval Karnataka ===
Sporting culture in Karnataka has a long history dating back to the ancient and medieval periods and was seen as a necessary physical excerise for hunting and military before being evolved into entertainment. Indigenous sports such as Kabaddi and similar sports served as a medium for social connection and community bonding in ancient Karnataka.

Sports also formed an important part of military training under the dynasties such as Western Chalukyas, Hoysalas and Vijayanagara Empire. Inscriptions across Karnataka such as the 982 CE Shravanabelagola inscription of the Rashtrakuta emperor Indra IV mentions India's one of the most extensive text detailing specialised tactics, maneuvers and rules of the game Polo. The Chalukya emperor Satyashraya was titled Kandukacharya (lit. 'Teacher of Polo') in the Morigere inscription. Similarly, Nagadeva, husband of Kannada poetess Attimabbe held the title of Kandukapurandara (lit. 'Lord of Polo').

The Manasollasa authored by the Chalukya King someshwara III has dedicated chapters to state-subsidised sports such as Bhramanshram (lit. 'endurance walking'), Bhrashram (lit. 'Weightlifting') and Malla-Stambha (lit. 'wrestling on wooden pillars'). The very name of Hoysala Kingdom is rooted on physical courage when the mythical boy Sala (also referred as Poysala) famously killed a tiger, saving his Guru Sudatta whilst in a forest. The word Hoy translates to "Strike" in Old Kannada, hence the name 'Hoy-sala'. The stone carvings of Hoysala architecture at Belur and Halebidu depict military archery contests, swordsmanship duels and chariot-racing formats.

During Vijayanagara Empire in the late medieval period, the foreign travelers like Abdul Razzak and Domingo Paes left behind accounts of the empire's sporting culture. Every military division and neighborhood featured heavily patronised Garadi Mane (lit. 'gymnasiums'). Men and Women alike trained under coaches to master Malla-yuddha (lit. 'wrestling') and heavy club swinging. The empire was ahead of its time with female wrestlers, judges and elite female bodyguards trained in hand-to-hand combat.

The Mahanavami Dibba festival (precursor to Mysuru Dasara) hosted national-level sports tournaments such as wrestling, elephant fighting and high-altitude Acrobatics before the royal courts. Alongside elephant fighting, Cockfighting, Ram fighting and Buffalo fighting seem to have been popular.

=== Colonial period ===
in 17th century, the Kingdom of Mysore under Raja Wodeyar I revived the Mahanavami Dibba tradition (Dasara) of the Vijayanagara Empire at Srirangapatna. This annual festival continued to feature sports tournaments. Garadi Mane was also revived and supported the kingdom's infantry forces. Later in the 18th century, the kingdom incorporated recreational sports such as cavalry Equestrianism, sword Fencing and specialised archery.

The stationing of British regiments in Mysore kingdom led to the birth of exclusive gymkhanas. The historic Bangalore Club was founded in 1868, which introduced Squash and Tennis to Karnataka. Chamarajendra Wadiyar X was keen on horse racing and established Mysore Race Club in 1891, to complement the racing tracks laid down by the British military in the Bangalore Cantonment area.

British officers stationed in the hilly region of Kodagu erstwhile Coorg Province, introduceed Field hockey to the local martial community. The Kodavas adopted the game with great interest, and laid the foundations of Hockey culture in Kodagu. The region would produce multiple Olympians who went on to represent Indian national team.

=== Post-independence ===
Following India's independence in 1947, the newly integrated state of Mysore systematically established governance of sports. Operating under the name of Mysore, Karnataka dominated Indian football in 1950s and 60s by winning Santosh Trophy in 1946–47 and 1952–53 and also became the first Indian football side to participate in AFC Champions League Elite erstwhile known as Asian Champion Club Tournament.

In 1969, the Government of Karnataka created Directorate of Youth Services (later reorganised into the Department of Youth Services and Sports) to build public stadiums, provide funding to the rural areas and to scout regional talent. In 1975, Sports Authority of India opened its Netaji Subhash National Institute Of Sports Southern Centre in Bengaluru, with the institute featuring high-altitude facilities that turned the city into a primary national camp for Olympic athletes, track runners, and hockey squads. Prakash Padukone won the coveted All England Open Badminton Championships in 1980 edition, which popularised Badminton in Karnataka.

== Administration ==
The Department of Youth Empowerment and Sports (DYES) is the state government body responsible for development of sports in Karnataka. DYES formulates sports policies, administers state-funded programmes, oversees sports infrastructure projects and coordinates in athlete welfare initiatives. It also organises state-level competitions, distributes financial assistance to athletes and implements schemes aimed at increasing participation in sports among youth, women and rural Karnataka.

Operating under DYES, is the Sports Authority of Karnataka (SAK) that functions as an apex body to regulate, support and promote sports across the state. While SAK is a state-level body, it also actively collaborates with Sports Authority of India'S (SAI) Southern Centre headquartered at Bangalore University. Karnataka Olympic Association (KOA) affiliated under Indian Olympic Association (IOA) is the state-level governing body responsible for promoting the Olympic movement and managing state level multi-sport competitions, it also serves as an umbrella organisation for all the registered state sports federations.

District-level sports in Karnataka are administered through a dual structure consisting of government officials from DYES and local-government bodies such as District panchayats. Every district is led by a deputy director or a District Youth Empowerment and Sports Officer (DYSO) who oversee the maintenance of state-owned district stadiums, state sports hostels, schools and conducts regional talent scouting. While the District panchayats are responsible for funding and building rural stadiums and organise rural sports meets.

=== State Sports Associations ===
Individual sports in Karnataka are governed by affiliated state associations to KOA that operate state teams, conduct state competitions and oversee the sport's development in the state. Unlike Olympic sports administered by KOA, Cricket in Karnataka is administered by Karnataka State Cricket Association (KSCA) and is affiliated with BCCI.

Affiliated sports associations in Karnataka to Karnataka Olympic Association (KOA)
Association	Abbv.	Sport	Website
Karnataka Amateur Archery Association	KAAA	Archery	—N/a
Karnataka Athletic Association	KAA	Track and field	—N/a
Karnataka Badminton Association	KBA	Badminton	—N/a
Karnataka State Basket Ball Association	KSBA	Basketball	karnatakabasketball
Karnataka Amateur Boxing Association	KABA	Boxing	—N/a
Karnataka Amateur Cycling Association	KACA	Cycling	kaca
Karnataka Fencing Association	KFA	Fencing	—N/a
Karnataka State Football Association	KSFA	Association football	ksfa
Gymnast Association of Karnataka	GAK	Gymnastics	—N/a
Karnataka Handball Association	KHA	Handball	karnatakahandballassociation
Hockey Karnataka	HK	Field hockey	—N/a
Karnataka Judo Association	KJA	Judo	—N/a
Karnataka Rajya Amateur Kabaddi Association	KRAKA	Kabaddi	—N/a
Kayaking & Canoeing Association of Karnataka	KCAK	Kayaking and Canoeing	—N/a
Karnataka Amateur Kho-Kho Association	KAKA	Kho kho	—N/a
Karnataka State Lawn Tennis Association	KSLTA	Tennis	kslta
Amateur Netball Association of Karnataka	ANBAK	Netball	anbak
Karnataka State Rifle Association	KSRA	Shooting sports	ksra
Karnataka Swimming Association	KSA	Swimming	karnatakaswimming
Karnataka Table Tennis Association	KTTA	Table tennis	karnatakatt
Karnataka Taekwondo Association	KTA	Taekwondo	karnatakataekwondo
Karnataka State Weightlifters Association	KSWA	Weightlifting	—N/a
Karnataka Wushu Association	KWA	Wushu	karnatakawushu

== Indigenous sports ==
Karnataka has a long history of sporting culture and boasts the presence of many indigenous sports developed since ancient times. These indigenous sports form an integral part of Karnataka's cultural heritage. However, some of the festivals involving animals such as Bull and Elephant face intense scrutiny due to safety hazards. While Cockfighting is seen as Animal abuse and has been made completely illegal across Karnataka and rest of India after Prevention of Cruelty to Animals Act, 1960.

=== Hori Habba ===
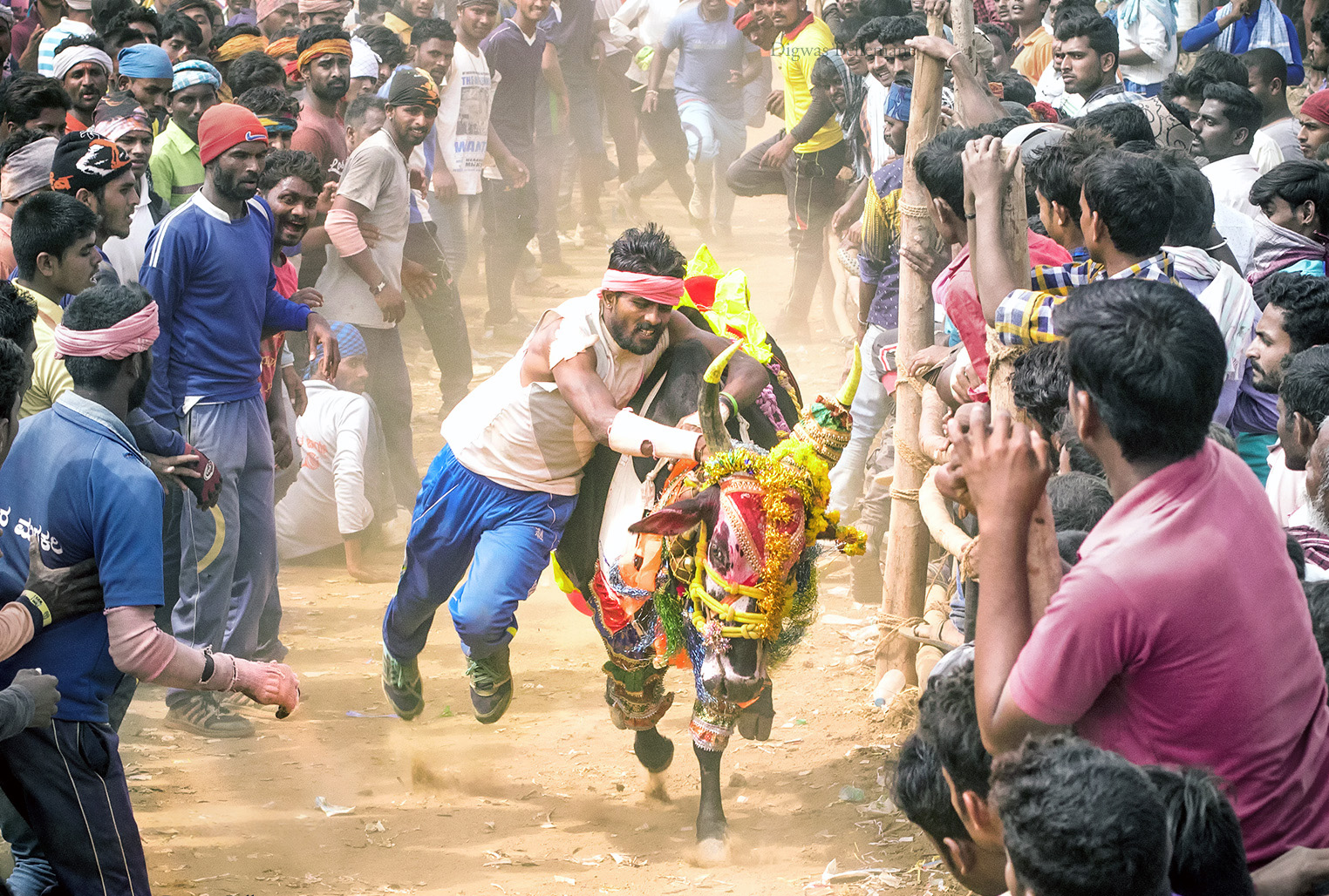
Catcher Byadagi Maantha attempting to snatch copra

Hori Habba (lit. 'Bull Festival') also known as Hatti Habba or Kobbari Hori is a high-energy rural bull-catching and bull-racing festival native to Karnataka. The festival is celebrated during harvest season following Deepawali festival. A highly athletic draught cattle or native bull breeds such as Hallikar are decorated and made to charge down a heavily crowded and narrow village track. The decorated garland is made of Copra (Kobbari), cash and valuable gift items. Youths attempt to chase down the rushing bull to snatch the garland and claim the associated rewards. If the bull crosses the finish line untouched without losing the garland, the bull and its owner are declared as winners.

=== Kambala ===
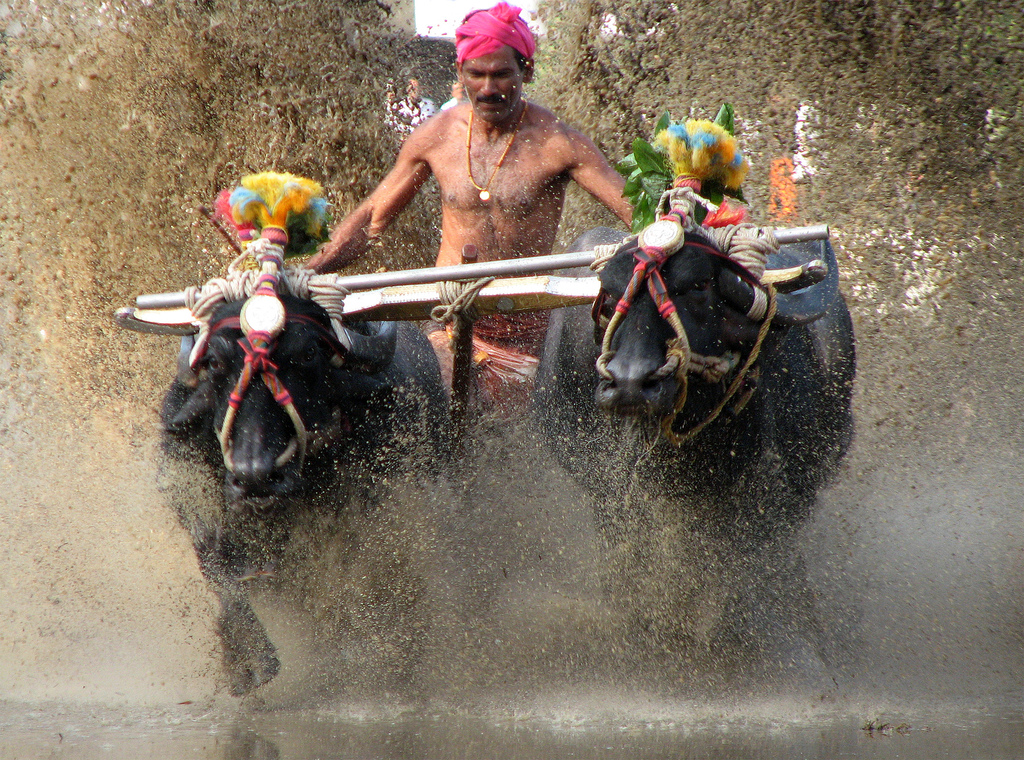
The Kambala race of Kadri is a distinctive feature of Tuluva culture

Kambala are a series of buffalo races contested in flooded paddy fields predominantly in coastal district of Dakshina Kannada. The sport involves pairs of bufalloes racing through waterlogged Paddy fields while guided by a Jockey. Historically organised as a post-harvest festival, modern Kambala competitions attract thousands of spectators. The Kambala of Kadri is a variant of the sport organised within the city's limits. Plikula Kambala is another Kambala event that is organised within the city of Mangaluru.

=== Korikatta ===
While Cockfighting is practiced across rural Karnataka, Korikatta or Kolikatta is a traditional contest involving specially bred roosters and is practiced in parts of coastal Karnataka, specially among the Tulu communities. A Mangaluru suburb is named Kadri Kambla after the cockfighting tradition.

== Popular sports ==
=== Association football ===
Amidst of cricket, which is the most popular sport of Karnataka, football finds its way in the state and attracts a good number of spectators during Indian Super League games of the club, Bengaluru FC. The game is also popular in the districts of Ballari, Mangaluru, Kodagu and Belagavi.

==== State team ====
Karnataka football team is a state team of Karnataka, which participates in Santosh Trophy. They have appeared in the Santosh Trophy finals nine times, and have won the trophy five times. Prior to 1972, the team competed as 'Mysore', and were the first Indian football team to compete in the AFC Champions League Elite erstwhile 'Asian Champion Club Tournament', in its 1969 edition. They were also the first Indian team to score a goal, to win a game, to qualify for knockouts and finish fourth in Asia's premier club competition.

Vinoth Kumar, Xavier Vijay Kumar, N.S. Manju, Kuppuswami Sampath, Shankar Sampingiraj, Karma Tsewang, Sanjeeva Uchil are the notable footballers from karnataka. The Dakshina Kannada District Football Association (DKDFA) annually organizes the Independence Day Cup, which is played on Independence Day at district football grounds adjacent to Nehru Maidan. Schools and colleges from across Dakshina Kannada, Udupi and Kodagu districts participate and the matches are conducted under seven categories for children and young adults in education.

==== Club football ====
Bengaluru FC is by far one of the most successful football Club in not only Karnataka but among entire Indian subcontinent, after having won six titles in short span. In 2016, Bengaluru FC became the first South Asian as well as first Indian club to reach the final of AFC Cup, the second-tier club competition in Asian Football Confederation. The club so far has won 2 I-League titles, 1 Indian Super League title, 2 Federation Cup titles, 1 Super Cup and 1 Durand Cup title.

Before Bengaluru FC, institutional clubs such as HAL SC and ITI participated in Indian club football leagues. Other notable clubs from Bengaluru include FC Bengaluru United, Ozone FC & South United FC, which participate in I-League Second Division. Notable clubs from other districts include FC Mangalore and Kodagu FC which participated in Bangalore Super Division.

==== State league ====
Karnataka does not have a state league but rather a district league in the form of Bangalore Super Division which acts as the professional top-tier league of the state where twenty clubs compete. Hindustan Aeronautics Limited S.C. or simply known as HAL SC is the most successful club. The Super Division is the top-tier league in Karnataka, followed by Bangalore A Division as the second tier, Bangalore B Division as the third tier & finally Bangalore C Division as the fourth tier league.

=== Badminton ===
Prakash Padukone is the most notable badminton player to emerge from Karnataka with his win in the All England Badminton Championships in 1980 being his most famous victory. His other notable achievement is the bronze medal at the World Championships held at Copenhagen in 1983. He has also won the Danish Open, Swedish Open and the Commonwealth Games Gold Medal in the event held in 1978 at Edmonton, Alberta, Canada. He has also been ranked World No. 1 in this sport. He has started a Badminton Academy with the help of the Tatas and this academy has a centre in Bengaluru.

=== Cricket ===
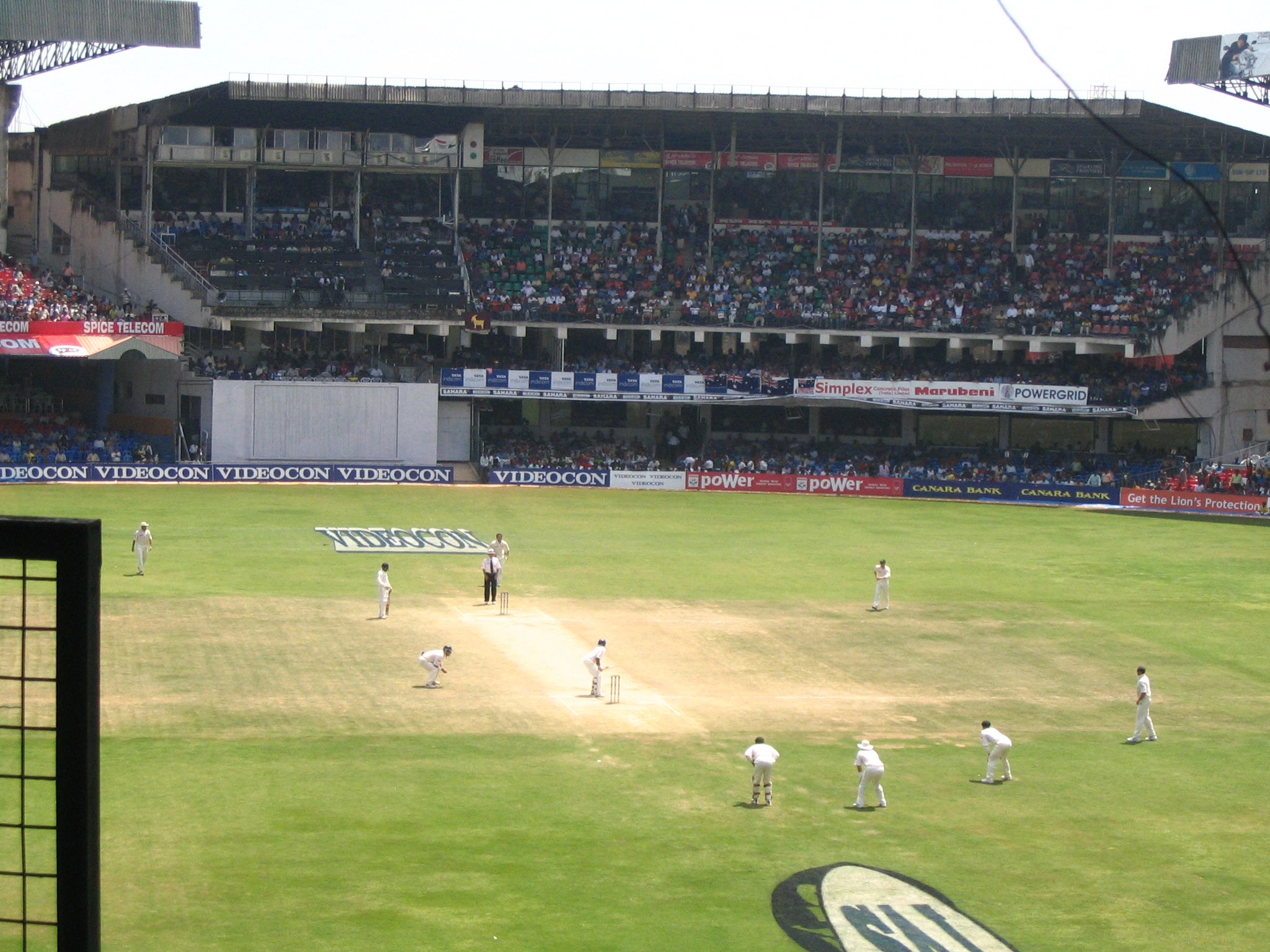
Chinnaswamy Stadium in Bengaluru hosting an International cricket match

Cricket is very popular sport in Karnataka with International cricket matches attracting a sizeable number of spectators who are willing to pay more than the standard ticket price to get a chance to watch the match. Chinnaswamy Stadium located in Bengaluru is the only stadium in Karnataka that has hosted International cricket matches. This stadium also hosts the National Cricket Academy which was started to train youngsters who could represent India in the future. Former Indian captain Anil Kumble holds the record for the most Test wickets among Indian bowlers. Rahul Dravid, the former Indian captain represents Karnataka in the Ranji Trophy. Syed Kirmani and Roger Binny from Karnataka were members of the Indian team that won the Cricket World Cup in the year 1983. Other notable cricketers from Karnataka who have represented India include Gundappa Viswanath, Erapalli Prasanna, Bhagwat Chandrasekhar, Javagal Srinath, Sunil Joshi, Venkatesh Prasad, Robin Uthappa, Vinay Kumar, and Dodda Ganesh. Karnataka have also won the Ranji Trophy six times. In a few International cricket matches held in the 1990s (One Day International and Test match), more than half of the Indian team were made of players from Karnataka. Deepak Chougule from Karnataka holds the junior world record for maximum runs scored in a single day when he scored 400 runs in his debut U-13 match against Goa.

Cricket is also popular in the coastal districts, especially Mangaluru. The Sports Authority of India (SAI) has a sports training centre at the Mangala Stadium and B.R. Ambedkar Cricket Stadium (near NMPT). Mangalore United is a Karnataka Premier League (KPL) franchise owned by Fiza Developers. Mangalore Premier League (MPL) is a cricket tournament organized by Karnataka Regional Cricket Academy.

=== Chess ===
Chess is a popular indoor pastime in Karnataka. Mangaluru is the headquarters of South Kanara District Chess Association (SKDCA), which has hosted two All India Open Chess tournaments.

=== Cue sports ===
Pankaj Advani from Bengaluru, has won three world titles in cue sports by the age of 20 including the IBSF World Snooker Championship in 2003 and the IBSF World Billiards Championship in 2005.

=== Hockey ===
Karnataka, particularly the district of Kodagu have produced numerous hockey players who went on to represent India at the international level. Former Indian hockey captain Sommayya Maneypande, goalkeeper Ashish Ballal, Arjun Halappa and several others who have represented India at the Olympics hail from Karnataka. Hockey finds a special place in the Kodava culture and the Kodava Hockey Festival held in Kodagu every month has been recognised by the Guinness Book of World Records as the largest hockey tournament in the state.

=== Kabaddi ===
Kabaddi originated in the regions of South India. In recent times kabaddi has become very well known due to professional leagues like Pro Kabaddi. Bengaluru Bulls is the team from Bengaluru city playing in Pro Kabaddi. Women like Mamatha Poojary are India's pride.

=== Tennis ===
Bengaluru has played host to the WTA event, the Bangalore Open which was held here in 2006 and 2007. Mahesh Bhupathi, the winner of many Grand Slam doubles titles, is a resident of Bengaluru and has set up a Tennis Academy here with the help of Nike.

=== Others ===
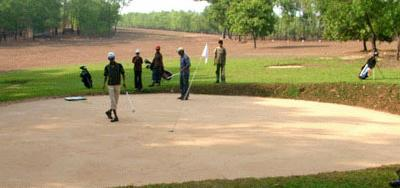
Mangalore Golf Course at Pilikula

Pilikula Nisargadhama, an integrated theme park, has an 18-hole golf course at Vamanjoor. Karnataka has around 340 km (210 mi) of coastline which enables beach sports. Mangaluru's Sasihithlu beach hosted the first edition of the Indian Open of Surfing in 2016. Mantra Surf Club located at nearby Mulki has trained surfers to represent India at the International Surfing Association (ISA) World SUP and Paddleboard Championship held in Fiji. The second edition of the Indian Open of Surfing was also held in Mangalore. International kite festivals are held at Panambur Beach and attract kite enthusiasts from Europe and Australia. A group of kite enthusiasts named Team Mangalore participates in these festivals.

== Events and leagues ==
Karnataka hosts various international, national, state-level and traditional sporting events. M. Chinnaswamy Stadium has notably hosted Cricket World Cup and T20 World Cup while Sree Kanteerava Stadium has hosted National Games and 2023 SAFF Championship. Notably, the 1997 National Games was co-hosted by Bengaluru and Mysuru.

=== Karnataka Kreedakoota ===
Also known as Karnataka State Games, Karnataka Kreedakoota is an initiative by Government of Karnataka to create a platform that serves in scouting and promoting local athletic talent from the grassroots to the national levels. The Games act as a premier Olympic-styled multi-sport festival between the districts, jointly held by DYES and KOA. The inaugural games were held from 16 to 22 January 2026 in the host city of Tumakuru. The state also organises the Mini Karnataka State Games for the younger athletes under the age of fourteen.

=== Men's leagues ===
The following table lists top-tier state-level men's sports leagues held in Karnataka. As of 8 June 2026

Men's sports leagues in Karnataka
League	Sport	Type	Teams	Duration	Operator	Status
Bangalore Football League	Association football	State-level league	18–20	3 months	Bangalore District Football Association (BDFA)	Active (2001–present)
Karnataka Premier League	Cricket	Twenty20 franchise league	7	1 month	KSCA	Defunct (2009–2019)
Maharaja Trophy KSCA T20	Cricket	Twenty20 franchise league	6	1 month	KSCA	Active (2022–present)

=== Women's leagues ===
The following table lists top-tier state-level women's sports leagues held in Karnataka. As of 8 June 2026

Women's sports leagues in Karnataka
League	Sport	Type	Teams	Duration	Operator	Status
Karnataka Women's League	Association football	State-level league	8–10	1–2 months	KSFA	Active (2019–present)
Maharani Trophy KSCA T20	Cricket	Twenty20 franchise league	TBD	1 month	KSCA	Active (2026–present)

== Clubs and franchises ==
The following tables list sports clubs and franchises based in Karnataka, which take part in national top divisional leagues or international leagues.

=== Men's ===
As of 3 June 2026

Karnataka based men's sports clubs and franchises
Team	Sport	League	City/Town	League titles	Status
Bangalore Warhawks	American football	Elite Football League of India	Bengaluru	—N/a	Dissolved (2012)
Bengaluru FC	Association football	Indian Super League	Bengaluru	3 (2013–14, 2015–16, 2018–19)	Active (2013–present)
Bengaluru Raptors	Badminton	Premier Badminton League	Bengaluru	2 (2018–19, 2020)	Active (2013–present)
Bangalore Hi-Fliers	Field hockey	Premier Hockey League	Bengaluru	2 (2006, 2008)	Dissolved (2005–2008)
Karnataka Lions	Field hockey	World Series Hockey	Bengaluru	—N/a	Dissolved (2011)
Bengaluru Bulls	Kabaddi	Pro Kabaddi League	Bengaluru	1 (2018–19)	Active (2014–present)
Bengaluru Bravehearts	Rugby sevens	Rugby Premier League	Bengaluru	—N/a	Active (2025–present)
Bangalore RFC	Rugby union	All India & South Asia Rugby Tournament	Bengaluru	—N/a	Active (1996–present)
Bangalore Raptors	Team tennis	Champions Tennis League	Bengaluru	—N/a	Dissolved (2014)
Royal Challengers Bengaluru	Twenty20 Cricket	Indian Premier League	Bengaluru	2 (2025, 2026)	Active (2008–present)
Bengaluru Torpedoes	Volleyball	Prime Volleyball League	Bengaluru	1 (2025)	Active (2021–present)

=== Women's ===
As of 3 June 2026

Karnataka based women's sports clubs and franchises
Team	Sport	League	City/Town	League titles	Status
Bengaluru FC	Association football	Karnataka Women's League	Bengaluru	—N/a	Active 2021–present)
Kickstart FC	Association football	Indian Women's League	Bengaluru	—N/a	Active 2016–present)
Royal Challengers Bengaluru	Twenty20 Cricket	Women's Premier League	Bengaluru	2 (2024, 2025)	Active 2023–present)

== Sports venues ==
The following table lists sports venues across Karnataka.

Sports venues across Karnataka
Venue	Location	Sport	Capacity	Opened	Picture
Aditya Global Cricket Stadium	Bengaluru North district	Cricket	—N/a	2011	[picture needed]
Ajjarakadu Stadium	Udupi	Track and field	10,000	2014	[picture needed]
Basavanagudi Aquatic Centre	Bengaluru	Swimming	1,200	1986	
Bengaluru Hockey Stadium	Bengaluru	Field hockey	—N/a	Unknown	[picture needed]
Central College Ground	Bengaluru	Cricket	—N/a	1935	[picture needed]
D.R. Bendre Cricket Stadium	Hubballi	Cricket	16,000	2012	
Dr Bhimrao Ambedkar Stadium	Vijayapura	Track and field	—N/a	1969	[picture needed]
Gangotri Glades Stadium	Mysuru	Cricket	15,000	1998	
Gymkhana Grounds	Bengaluru	Multi-sports	—N/a	Unknown	[picture needed]
KSCA Stadium	Belagavi	Cricket	—N/a	2016	[picture needed]
M. Chinnaswamy Stadium	Bengaluru	Cricket	40,000	1972	
Mangala Stadium	Mangaluru	Track and field	8,000	19 March 2013	
Mysore Race Course	Mysuru	Horse racing	—N/a	1920	
Nehru Maidan (Central Maidan)	Mangaluru	Association football	—N/a	3 December 2025	
Nehru Stadium (Hubballi)	Hubballi	Multi-sports	15,000	1958	[picture needed]
Nehru Stadium (Shivamogga)	Shivamogga	Track and field	—N/a	1974	[picture needed]
Nehru Stadium (Tumakuru)	Tumakuru	Track and field	—N/a	Unknown	[picture needed]
Rajinder Singh Institute Ground	Bengaluru	Cricket	—N/a	Unknown	[picture needed]
RN Shetty Stadium	Dharawada	Track and field	20,000	1949	
Sree Kanteerava Stadium	Bengaluru	Track and field	25,810	1946	
Sree Kanteerava Indoor Stadium	Bengaluru	Indoor sports	4,000	1997	
Koramangala Indoor Stadium	Bengaluru	Indoor sports	2,300	1997	[picture needed]
Three Ovals KSCA Stadium (Alur)	Bengaluru	Cricket	—N/a	2011	
U S Mallya Indoor Stadium	Mangaluru	Indoor sports	1,500	2004	[picture needed]

== See also ==
- Jallikattu
- Sport in India
