= Kishore (name) =

Kishore ([kɪʃoːr]) is an Indian name that may refer to:

Given or middle name

- Kishore (actor, born 1974) (born 1974), Indian film actor
- Kishore Bhanushali, Indian actor
- Kishore Biyani, Indian businessman
- Kishore Chandra Deo (born 1947), Indian politician
- Kishore Chauhan (born 1949), Indian criminal
- Kishore DS, Indian film actor
- Kishore Dang (born 1958), Indian film and TV show director
- Kishore Kumar (1929–1987), film playback singer, actor, lyricist, composer, producer, director, and screenwriter
- Kishore Kunal, Indian Sanskrit scholar
- Kishore Mahbubani (born 1948), Singaporean diplomat
- Kishore Namit Kapoor (born 1949), Indian actor, author and film-acting trainer
- Kishore Pawar (c.1926–2013), Indian trade union leader and politician
- Kishore Sahu (1915–1980), Indian actor, film director, screenwriter and producer
- Kishore Te (1978–2015), Indian film editor
- Kishore Upadhyaya, Indian politician
- Ashish Kishore Lele (born 1967), Indian chemical engineer
- Bira Kishore Ray, Chief Justice of Orissa High Court in India
- Chandra Kishore Shrestha, Indian dramatist and social worker
- Deepali Kishore (born 1989), Indian singer
- Dhirendra Kishore Chakravarti (1902–after 1982), geologist and paleontologist
- Ganga Kishore Bhattacharya (died 1831), Indian journalist, teacher and reformer
- Kant Kishore Bhargava, Indian diplomat
- Ladu Kishore Swain, Indian politician.
- Mohan Kishore Namadas, Indian revolutionary and independence fighter in the 1930s
- Naba Kishore Ray (born 1940), Indian theoretical and computational chemist
- Nand Kishore Acharya (born 1945), Indian playwright, poet, and critic
- Nand Kishore Chaudhary (born 1953), Indian social entrepreneur
- Nand Kishore Garg (born 1949), Indian social worker
- Nandikishore Patel (born 1982), Indian-born Ugandan cricketer
- Nand Kishore Yadav, Indian cabinet minister
- Nand Kishore Yadav (SP), Indian politician
- Nanda Kishore, Indian film director and screenwriter
- Nanda Kishore Bal (1875–1928), Indian poet
- Pran Kishore Kaul, Kashmiri stage personality
- Raj Kishore Kesri (died 2011), Indian politician
- Ram Kishore Shukla (1923–2003), Indian politician
- Ravindra Kishore Sinha (born 1951), Indian journalist, politician and social entrepreneur

Surname

- Akhila Kishore, Indian film actress
- Andrew Kishore, Bangladeshi singer
- Gadari Kishore, Indian politician
- Giriraj Kishore (1920–2014), Indian Hindu nationalist
- Joseph Kishore (born 1980), American activist and writer
- Jugal Kishore (disambiguation), several people
- Kaushal Kishore (disambiguation), several people
- Munshi Nawal Kishore (1836—1895), Indian book publisher
- Nand Kishore (cricketer, born 1970), Indian cricketer
- Nanda Kishore, Indian film director and screenwriter
- Ravisrinivasan Sai Kishore (born 1996), Indian cricketer
- S. Kishore (born 1962), Sri Lankan Tamil politician
- Shalinee Kishore (born 1974), American electrical engineer
- Shelly Kishore, Indian film and television actress
- Shriya Kishore (born 1986), Indian beauty queen
- Sneha Kishore (born 1993), Indian cricketer
- Sravanthi Ravi Kishore, Indian film producer
- Tanvi Kishore, Indian Marathi film actress
- Vennela Kishore, Indian Tollywood actor

== See also ==
- Kishore (disambiguation)
- Kishor
