= Phadke =

Phadke is a surname native to the Indian state of Maharashtra. It is found among the Chitpavan Brahmin community.

== Notable people ==
- Arun G. Phadke – electrical engineer, professor at Virginia Tech
- Asha Phadke - Phd, Educator of Sanskrit, Deccan College
- Dattatraya Yeshwant Phadke – scientist at Tata Institute of Fundamental Research, awarded Padma Bhushan
- Kishor Phadke – psychologist
- Mrudula Phadke – Vice Chancellor of the Maharashtra University of Health Sciences
- N S Phadke – Marathi writer
- Raghunath Krishna Phadke (1884–1972) – sculptor
- Sudhir Phadke – singer, music director, writer
- Shridhar Phadke – son of Sudhir Phadke, music director and DGM in Air India
- Vasudev Balwant Phadke (1845–1883) – freedom fighter
- Vinod Phadke – politician and cricket administrator
- Vitthal Laxman Phadke – social worker. awarded Padma Bhushan
- Y D Phadke – historian, writer and activist
