= Vinod =

Vinod (Hindi: विनोद , Marathi: विनोद , Gujarati: વિનોદ) is a male given name used in India and Sri Lanka, meaning "delight", "enjoyment", or "pleasure".

== People ==
- Vinod Agarwal aai doniv , Indian-American businessman and scientist
- Vinod Aggarwal, American economist and political scientist
- Vinod Kumar Alva, Indian actor
- Vinod Bala Arun, Indian academic
- Vinod Kumar Bansal, Indian businessman
- Vinod Kumar Baranwal, Indian judge
- Vinod Bharathan, film director from Copenhagen
- A. Vinod Bharathi, Indian cinematographer
- Vinod Bhatia, Indian Air Force officer
- Vinod Bhatt, Gujarati-language author
- Vinod Bhayana, Indian politician
- Vinod Kumar Binny, Indian politician
- Vinod Kumar Boianapalli, Indian politician
- Vinod Chaubey, Indian Police Service officer
- Vinod Chohan, Tanzanian engineer at CERN
- Vinod Dham, father of the Pentium chip
- Vinod Dua, Indian television presenter and journalist
- Vinod Kumar Duggal, Indian civil servant
- Vinod Goenka, Indian businessman
- Vinod Gupta, former CEO of infoGROUP
- Vinod Johri, Indian astrophysicist
- Vinod Jose, Indian journalist and editor
- Vinod Joshi, Indian poet
- Vinod K. Singh, Indian chemist
- Vinod Kambli, Indian cricketer
- Vinod Khanna, Indian film actor
- Vinod Khosla, co-founder of Sun Microsystems
- Vinod Kinariwala, Indian independence student-activist
- Vinod Kovoor, Indian film actor
- Vinod Krishan, Indian physicist
- Vinod Kulkarni, Indian actor
- Vinod Kumar (disambiguation)
- Vinod Maharaj, Fiji-Indian politician
- Vinod Mehra, Indian film actor
- Vinod Mehta, Indian journalist and editor
- Vinod C. Menon, former Chief of Emergency in UNICEF, India
- Vinod Mishra, Indian politician
- Vinod Nagpal, Indian film and television actor
- Vinod Patel, Fiji-Indian businessman and politician
- Vinod Patney, Indian Air Force officer
- Vinod Phadke, Indian politician
- Vinod Prakash Sharma, Indian scientist
- Vinod Rai, former Comptroller and Auditor General of India
- Vinod Raina, Indian educationist
- Vinod Raj, Kannada film actor
- Vinod Rams, American artist
- Vinod Rathod, Bollywood playback singer
- Vinod Saroj, Indian politician
- Vinod Scaria, Indian scientist and biochemist
- Vinod Sekhar, Malaysian businessman and philanthropist
- Vinod Kumar Shukla, Hindi-language author
- Vinod Kumar Shukla (politician), Indian businessman and politician
- Vinod Singh (actor), Indian television actor
- Vinod Kumar Sonkar, Indian politician
- Vinod Sukumaran, Indian filmmaker
- Vinod Tawde, Indian politician

=== Surname ===
- Mahendra Chand Vinod, Fiji-Indian civil servant
- P. S. Vinod, Indian cinematographer
- Padmanath Bhattacharya Vidya Vinod, Indian historian

=== Stage name ===
- Vinod (composer) (1922–1959), Indian film music director

== Fictional characters ==
- title character of Agent Vinod (1977 film)
- title character of Agent Vinod (2012 film)
- Vinod Chanda, from animated series Pantheon

== See also ==
- Vinoth
- Binod
