= Indiranagar, Mysore =

Town in Karnataka

Indiranagar Ittigegud
- Interactive map of Indiranagar
- Coordinates: 12.301831°N 76.662248°E
- Country: India
- State: Karnataka

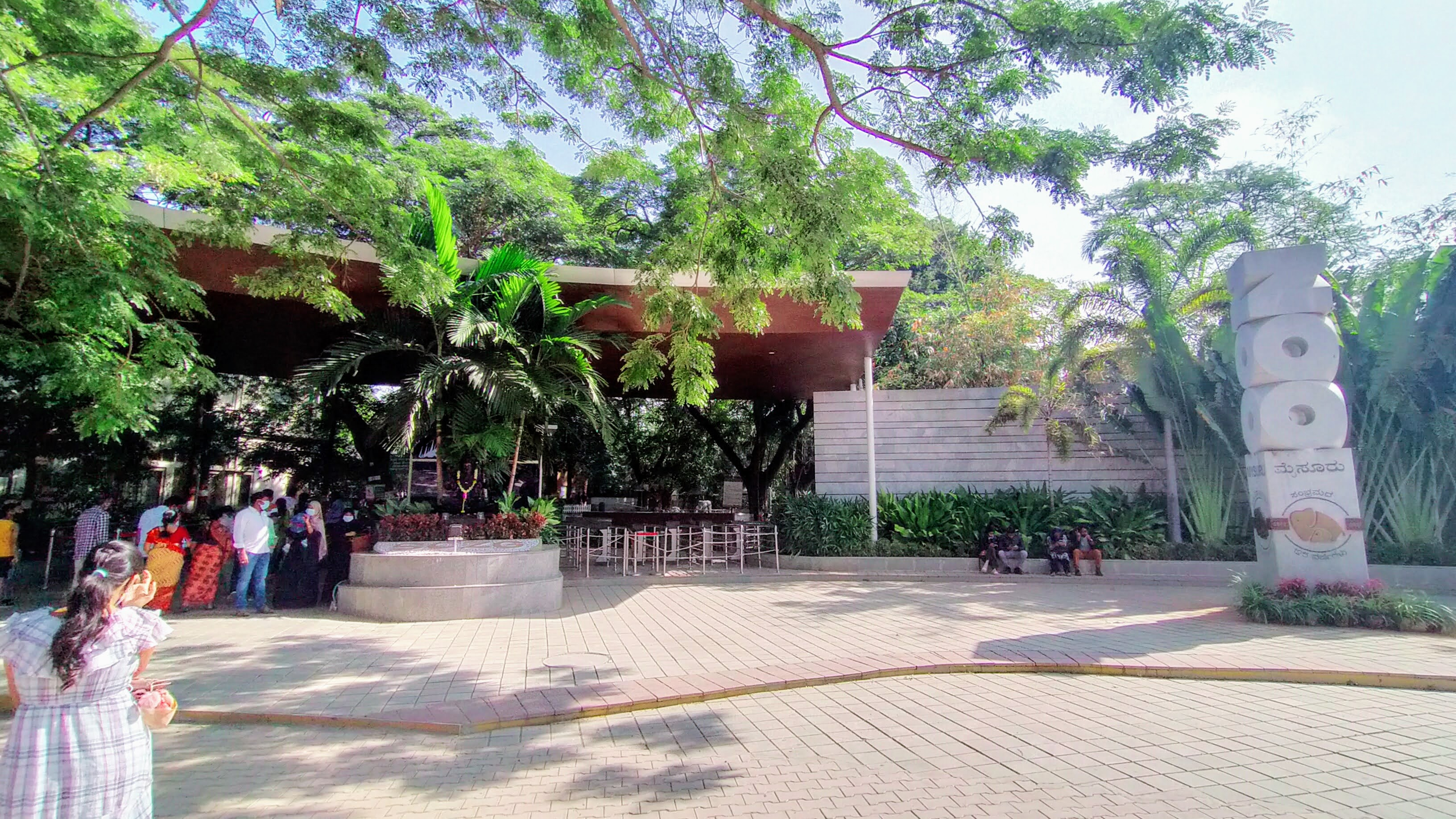
Entrance of Sri Chamarajendra Zoological Gardens

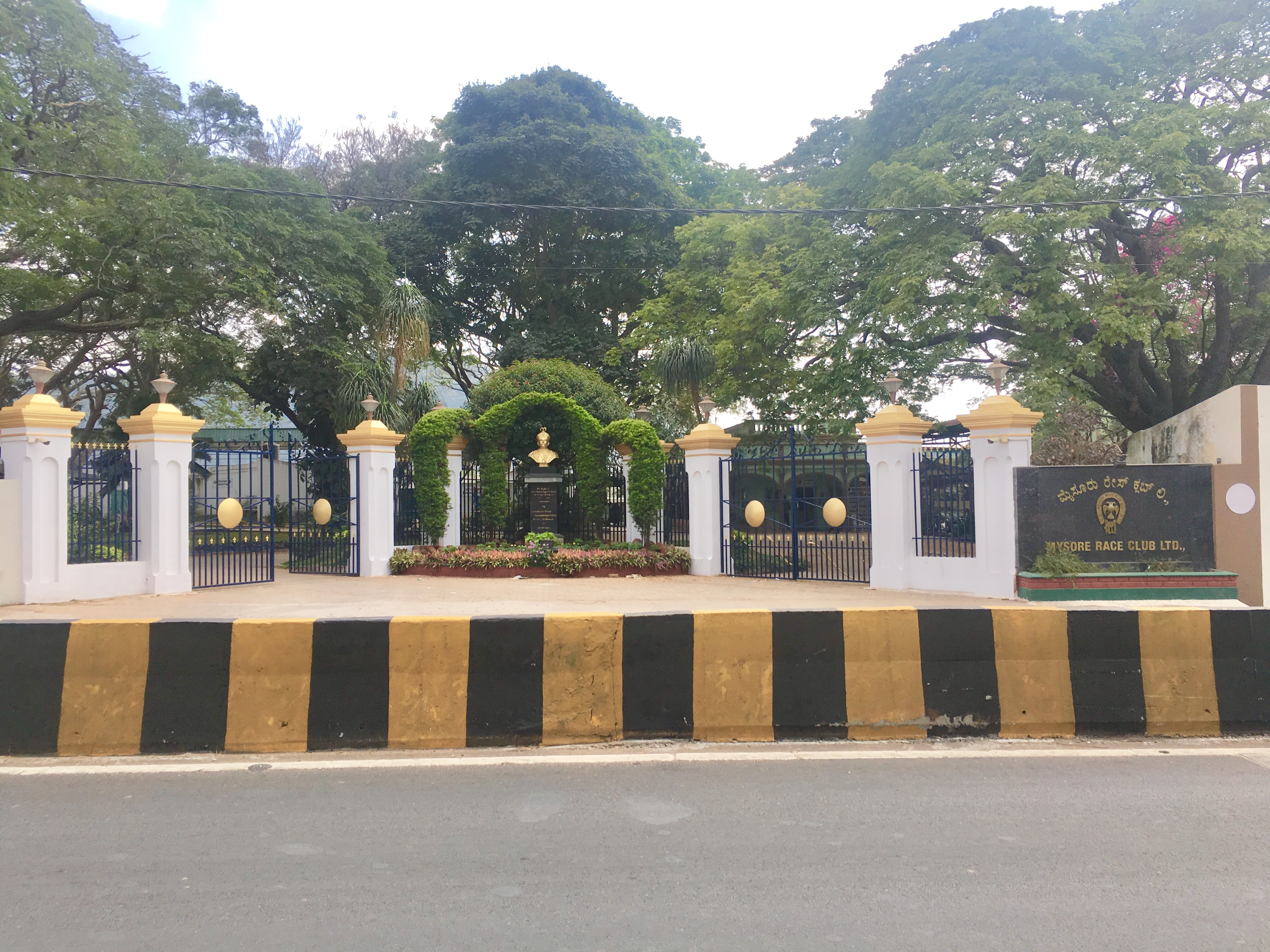
Mysore Race Club

Indiranagar or Ittigegud is a suburb of Mysore City in Karnataka state, India.

== Location and etymology ==
Indiranagar is located South of famous Mysore Palace. Ittigegud, translating brickyard or brickfield in Kannada, which was the place where Bricks were prepared.

== Tourist attractions ==
Indiranagar is home to many popular places. Namely Sri Chamarajendra Zoological Gardens, Mysore Race Course and Mysore Dasara exhibition Grounds at Doddakere maidan.

== Other places ==
Indiranagar is home to many cultural activities and famous Ittigegud Karaga or Mysore Kagara, also known as Sri Chamundeshwari and Sri Maariyamma Karaga Mahotsava is an annual festival celebrated in Indiranagar which is an initiative form Sri Renukadevi Karaga Temple and the Karaga starts from there before getting immersed at Paschimavahini near Srirangapatna. Ittigegud is a happening place due to presence of Mall of Mysore, Lokaranjan Grounds, Lions club, Ittigegud Citizens Welfare Committee.

== Notable people ==
- Dwarakish
- Darshan

== See also ==
- Sri Chamarajendra Zoological Gardens
- Mysore Race Course
- Mysore Dasara Exhibition
