= Vinod Kumar Singh =

Vinod Kumar Singh may refer to:

- Vinod Kumar Singh (Bagodar politician) (born 1976), Indian politician
- Vinod Kumar Singh (Gonda politician) (1964–2021), Indian politician
- Vinod K. Singh (born 1959), Indian chemist

== See also ==
- Vinod Singh (disambiguation)
- Vinod Kumar (disambiguation)
- Binod Kumar Singh (died 2020), Indian politician
