= Kishor =

Kishor (Hindi: किशोर}) is a name mostly used in India and Nepal. It is derived from the Sanskrit word kishora meaning "colt" or a "cub". It translates to "young", "youth" or "adolescence" in English.

== People with the given name ==
- Kishor Gurung, Nepalese guitarist and ethnomusicologist
- Kishor Kadam (born 1967), Marathi poet (known as Saumitra) and actor
- Kishor Shantabai Kale (1970–2007), Marathi writer and social worker from Maharashtra, India
- Kishor Kumar (1929–1987), Indian actor, musician, and filmmaker
- Kishor C. Mehta, American professor of civil engineering at Texas Tech University, specializing in wind engineering
- Kishor Nath, Indian politician
- Kishor Parekh (1930–1982), Indian photojournalist
- Kishor Patel (born 1982), English cricketer (a right-handed batsman)
- Kishor Appa Patil (born 1970), Indian politician
- Kishor Phadke (born 1936), Indian psychologist
- Kishor Satya, Indian actor

== People with the surname ==
- Akshara Kishor (born 2008), Indian actress
- Kamal Kishor (born 1956), Indian politician
- Prashant Kishor (born 1977), Indian political advisor
- Ram Kishor (1918–1994), Indian Hindu leader

== See also ==
- Kishor, ancient Jewish town in the Hebron Hills
- Kishore (disambiguation)
