= 2026 Prime Volleyball League =

- League: Prime Volleyball League
- Sport: Men's volleyball
- Duration: 30 November – December 2026
- Games: 48
- Teams: 10
- TV partner: Sony Sports
- Streaming partner: YouTube

Finals

Prime Volleyball League seasons
- 2025 2027

2026 Prime Volleyball League (also known as PVL 2026 or RuPay PVL 2026) is the fifth season of the Prime Volleyball League, a franchise-based Indian professional men's volleyball league. The season is scheduled to begin on 30 November 2026.

The league is organized by Baseline Ventures and has been recognised by the Fédération Internationale de Volleyball (FIVB) as India's first-division professional volleyball league.

== Background ==
The fifth season of the Prime Volleyball League is scheduled to begin on 30 November 2026. The Season 5 player auction is scheduled to be held in Goa on 17 August 2026. The league consists of ten franchises. The teams are Ahmedabad Defenders, Bengaluru Torpedoes, Calicut Heroes, Chennai Blitz, Delhi Toofans, Goa Guardians, Telugu Black Hawks, Kochi Blue Spikers, Kolkata Thunderbolts and Mumbai Meteors.

The 2026 season is scheduled to feature 48 matches. The league stage will follow a single round-robin format, with the top five teams advancing to the Super 5 stage. The team finishing first in the Super 5 stage will advance directly to the final, while the second- and third-placed teams will play an eliminator for the remaining final berth.

Bengaluru Torpedoes enter the season as defending champions after winning the 2025 Prime Volleyball League title by defeating Mumbai Meteors in the final.
