= 2024 Prime Volleyball League =

- League: Prime Volleyball League
- Sport: Men's volleyball
- Duration: 15 February – 21 March 2024
- Teams: 9
- TV partner(s): Sony Sports; Volleyball World

Finals

Prime Volleyball League seasons
- ← 2023 2025 →

2024 Prime Volleyball League (also known as PVL 2024 or RuPay PVL 2024) is the third season of the Prime Volleyball League, a franchise based Indian indoor volleyball league, organized by Baseline Ventures.

== Format ==
Nine teams are contesting in the third season with the addition of Delhi Toofans. There are a total of 36 matches with each team plays against each other in a single round-robin format with the top 5 teams moving into the Super 5.

== Venue ==
All the matches are held at the Jawaharlal Nehru Stadium in Chennai.

== League standings ==
If the teams are level on points, the number of sets won will be taken into consideration. The top five teams at the end of the league stage will move into the Super-5.

Pos	Team	Pld	W	L	Pts	SW	SL	SR	SPW	SPL	SPR	Qualification
1	Kolkata Thunderbolts	0	0	0	0	0	0	—	0	0	—	Qualified for Super-5
2	Ahmedabad Defenders	0	0	0	0	0	0	—	0	0	—	Qualified for Super-5
3	Calicut Heroes	0	0	0	0	0	0	—	0	0	—	Qualified for Super-5
4	Bengaluru Torpedoes	0	0	0	0	0	0	—	0	0	—	Qualified for Super-5
5	Hyderabad Black Hawks	0	0	0	0	0	0	—	0	0	—	Qualified for Super-5
6	Mumbai Meteors	0	0	0	0	0	0	—	0	0	—	
7	Kochi Blue Spikers	0	0	0	0	0	0	—	0	0	—	
8	Chennai Blitz	0	0	0	0	0	0	—	0	0	—	
9	Delhi Toofans	0	0	0	0	0	0	—	0	0	—	

== League stage ==
Date	Time		Score		Set 1	Set 2	Set 3	Set 4	Set 5	Total	Report
15 Feb	18:30	Ahmedabad Defenders	3–0	Chennai Blitz	15–10	15–11	15–12			45–33	1
15 Feb	20:30	Bengaluru Torpedoes	3–1	Kolkata Thunderbolts	16–14	14–16	15–13	15–10		60–53	2
16 Feb	18:30	Mumbai Meteors	3–2	Delhi Toofans	15–13	17–15	13–15	13–15	17-15	75–58	3
16 Feb	20:30	Kochi Blue Spikers	1–3	Calicut Heroes	8–15	12–15	15–12	12–15		47–57	4
17 Feb	20:30	Chennai Blitz	3–0	Hyderabad Black Hawks	16–14	15–11	15–7			46–32	5
18 Feb	18:30	Ahmedabad Defenders	3–0	Kolkata Thunderbolts	15–13	15–9	15–6			45–28	6
18 Feb	20:30	Bengaluru Torpedoes	0–3	Delhi Toofans	10–15	13–15	20–21			43–51	7
19 Feb	20:30	Mumbai Meteors	2–3	Hyderabad Black Hawks	15–7	15–12	10–15	11–15	18-20	69–49	8
20 Feb	20:30	Chennai Blitz	3–0	Kochi Blue Spikers	15–10	15–12	16–14			46–36	9
21 Feb	20:30	Bengaluru Torpedoes	2–3	Mumbai Meteors	15–8	12–15	10–15	15–11	9-15	61–49	10
22 Feb	18:30	Kolkata Thunderbolts	2–3	Chennai Blitz	16–14	20–21	5–15	19–17	8-15	68–67	11
22 Feb	20:30	Ahmedabad Defenders	3–0	Hyderabad Black Hawks	17–15	15–13	15–11			47–39	8
