= Vinoth =

Vinoth is an Indian given name and surname.

Notable people with the name include:

== Surname ==
- Charles Vinoth, Indian actor
- Gnaruban Vinoth, Sri Lankan footballer
- H. Vinoth, Indian director
- Kalloori Vinoth (born 1988), Indian actor

== Given name ==
- Vinoth Babu, Indian actor
- Vinoth Baskaran (born 1990), Singaporean footballer
- Vinoth Kishan (born 1989), Indian actor
- Vinoth Kumar (born 1994), Indian football player

== See also ==
- Vinod
