= 2012–13 BDFA Super Division =

BDFA Super Division
- Season: 2012–13
- Champions: HAL (7th title)
- Relegated: Postal Department; Students Union; DYSS

The 2012–13 BDFA Super Division was the tenth season of the BDFA Super Division which is the third tier of the Indian football system and the top tier of the Karnataka football system.

At the end of the season it was HAL Sports Club who finished as the champions.

== Teams ==
Club
ADE
ASC
DYSS
HAL
KGF Academy
KSP
MEG
Postal
RWF
South United
Students Union

== Table ==
Pos	Team	Pld	W	D	L	GF	GA	GD	Pts	Qualification or relegation
1	HAL (C)	10	7	2	1	26	9	+17	23	Champions
2	South United	10	6	2	2	27	7	+20	20	
3	ASC	10	5	4	1	16	7	+9	19	
4	MEG	10	5	4	1	14	6	+8	19	
5	KGF Academy	10	4	3	3	17	14	+3	15	
6	ADE	10	3	3	4	14	14	0	12	
7	RWF	10	3	3	4	12	17	−5	12	
8	KSP	10	2	5	3	16	13	+3	11	
9	Postal Department (R)	10	2	5	3	7	10	−3	11	Relegated to A Division
10	Students Union (R)	10	1	3	6	8	27	−19	6	Relegated to A Division
11	DYSS (R)	10	0	0	10	8	41	−33	0	Relegated to A Division

Updated to match(es) played on 17 February 2013. Source: GCSStars
Rules for classification: 1) points; 2) goal difference; 3) number of goals scored.
(C) Champions; (R) Relegated

== Fixtures and Results ==
2 December 2012	Students Union	2 – 1	DYSS	Bangalore Football Stadium, Bangalore
Sunday 15:00 IST	Satish 72'; Dinesh 80'	Report	Santosh 42'

3 December 2012	RWF	1 – 2	ASC	Bangalore Football Stadium, Bangalore
Monday 15:00 IST	Prakash 82'	Report	Sreejith 50'; Singh 74'

4 December 2012	MEG	1 – 1	KSP	Bangalore Football Stadium, Bangalore
Tuesday 15:00 IST	Hmar 66'	Report	Karthick 14'

5 December 2012	KGF Academy	1 – 1	Postal	Bangalore Football Stadium, Bangalore
Wednesday 15:00 IST	Hussain 54'	Report	Joy 13'

6 December 2012	South United	2 – 0	ASC	Bangalore Football Stadium, Bangalore
Thursday 15:00 IST	Vignesh 47'; Murugappan 60'	Report

7 December 2012	DYSS	1 – 7	KSP	Bangalore Football Stadium, Bangalore
Friday 15:00 IST	Prakash 14'	Report	Pradeep 8'; Venkatesh 20'; Arunkumar 31', 57'; Kumar 35', 87'; Karthick 45'

8 December 2012	RWF	1 – 0	Students Union	Bangalore Football Stadium, Bangalore
Saturday 15:00 IST	Babu 7'	Report

9 December 2012	HAL	0 – 2	MEG	Bangalore Football Stadium, Bangalore
Sunday 15:00 IST		Report	Ramu 40'; Brajohn 49'

10 December 2012	ASC	0 – 0	Postal	Bangalore Football Stadium, Bangalore
Monday 15:00 IST		Report

11 December 2012	ADE	3 – 2	KGF Academy	Bangalore Football Stadium, Bangalore
Tuesday 15:00 IST	Sridharan 7'; Santosh 9'; Xavier 23'	Report	Rajesh 40'; T. Singh 59'

12 December 2012	RWF	1 – 1	MEG	Bangalore Football Stadium, Bangalore
Wednesday 15:00 IST	Deepu 50'	Report	Hmar 42'

13 December 2012	HAL	2 – 1	South United	Bangalore Football Stadium, Bangalore
Thursday 15:00 IST	Pappiah 24'; Kumar 63'	Report	Stephen 87'

14 December 2012	ASC	3 – 1	Students Union	Bangalore Football Stadium, Bangalore
Friday 15:00 IST	Arunjeet 24'; Barelly 65'; Sudherkumar 74'	Report	Philip 82'

15 December 2012	MEG	1 – 0	ADE	Bangalore Football Stadium, Bangalore
Saturday 15:00 IST	Ramu 40'	Report

16 December 2012	South United	1 – 1	KGF Academy	Bangalore Football Stadium, Bangalore
Sunday 15:00 IST	Manivannan 11'	Report	Rajesh 5'

17 December 2012	Postal	2 – 1	DYSS	Bangalore Football Stadium, Bangalore
Monday 15:00 IST	Keneth 22'; Venkatesh 30'	Report	Sunil 55'

18 December 2012	ADE	2 – 1	RWF	Bangalore Football Stadium, Bangalore
Tuesday 15:00 IST	Stephen 22'; Xavier 36'	Report	Regin 42'

19 December 2012	HAL	5 – 1	Students Union	Bangalore Football Stadium, Bangalore
Wednesday 15:00 IST	Kumar 25', 45+2', 56'; Emmanuel 28'; Hamza 42'	Report	Babalola 83'

20 December 2012	DYSS	0 – 7	South United	Bangalore Football Stadium, Bangalore
Thursday 15:00 IST		Report	Vignesh 1'; Amoes 12', 22'; Kumar 26'; Stephen 33', 51', 80'

21 December 2012	Postal	0 – 1	RWF	Bangalore Football Stadium, Bangalore
Friday 15:00 IST		Report	Vijay 53'

22 December 2012	Students Union	2 – 2	ADE	Bangalore Football Stadium, Bangalore
Saturday 15:00 IST	Heraland 42'; Mong 90'	Report	Stephen 56'; Xavier

23 December 2012	HAL	4 – 0	KGF Academy	Bangalore Football Stadium, Bangalore
Sunday 15:00 IST	Emmanuel 20', 42'; Kumar 29', 64'	Report

24 December 2012	MEG	0 – 0	Postal	Bangalore Football Stadium, Bangalore
Monday 15:00 IST		Report

25 December 2012	ASC	5 – 0	DYSS	Bangalore Football Stadium, Bangalore
Tuesday 15:00 IST		Report

26 December 2012	South United	1 – 1	RWF	Bangalore Football Stadium, Bangalore
15:00 IST		Report

27 December 2012	HAL	3 – 1	ADE	Bangalore Football Stadium, Bangalore
15:00 IST		Report

28 December 2012	KSP	3–0	Students Union	Bangalore Football Stadium, Bangalore
15:00 IST	Arun Kumar 4'; Vinod Kumar 29'; Karthik M. 34'	Report

29 December 2012	KGF Academy	1–0	MEG	Bangalore Football Stadium, Bangalore
15:00 IST	Ajay 3'	Report

30 December 2012	South United	3–1	Postal Department	Bangalore Football Stadium, Bangalore
15:00 IST	V. R. Murugappan 6'; Do 45+1'; Stephen 71'	Report	Chetan Kumar 27' (pen.)

31 December 2012	KSP	0–2	ASC	Bangalore Football Stadium, Bangalore
15:00 IST		Report	Prakash 36'; A. Saikh 51'
