= Binod =

Given name

- Gender: Male
- Language: Bengali, Odia, Nepali, Bodo

Origin
- Origin: Sanskrit
- Meaning: Happiness
- Region of origin: India, Nepal

Other names
- Alternative spelling: Vinod
- Related names: Vinod
- Popularity: see popular names

Binod is a name in Bengali, Odia, Nepali and Bodo languages, which comes from the Sanskrit for "happiness" or "joy".

Notable people with the name include:

- Binod Bhandari (born 1990), Nepalese cricketer
- Binod Bihari Chowdhury (1911–2013), Bangladeshi revolutionary
- Binod Chaudhary (born 1955), Nepalese businessman
- Binod Das (born 1983), Nepalese cricketer
- Binod Kanungo (1912–1990), Indian writer
- Binod Pradhan (born 1973), Indian cinematographer
- Binod Bhandari (born 1989), Nepalese cricketer
- Benode Behari Mukherjee (1904–1980), Indian artist
