= Lalithadripura =

Suburb of Mysore, Karnataka

Coordinates: 12.276023°N 76.698762°E

Lalithadripura is a suburb of Mysore city in Karnataka state of India.

== Location ==
Lalithadripura is located on the eastern side of Mysore city near the Chamundi Hills. It has a post office and the PIN code is 570027.

== Demographics ==
There are 4124 people in Lalithadripura village according to 2011 census.

== See also ==
- Mysore Race Course
