= Kishore =

Kishore (IPA: [kɪʃoːr]) may refer to:

- Kishore (name), an Indian given name and surname
- Captain Kishore, a 1940 Bollywood film
- K for Kishore, a 2007–2008 Indian television singing contest
- Kishore Bangla, Bengali-language juvenile weekly newspaper
- Gour Kishore Ghosh metro station of the Kolkata Metro
- Dum Dum Kishore Bharati High School in Kolkata, India
- Kishore Bharati Krirangan, a multipurpose stadium in Kolkata, India
- Kishore Bharati Bhagini Nivedita (Co-ed) College in Behala, West Bengal, India
- Kishore Kala Mandir, a private building in Beohari city, India
- Kishore Vaigyanik Protsahan Yojana (English: Young Scientist Incentive Plan), an Indian government scholarship program
- Maharaja Harendra Kishore Public Library in Bettiah, Bihar, India

== See also ==
- Kishor, alternate spelling of the Indian name
