= Vinod Singh =

Vinod Singh may refer to:

- Vinod Singh (actor), Indian television actor
- Vinod Singh (Bagodar politician), Indian politician from Jharkhand
- Vinod Singh (Gonda politician) (1962–2021), Indian politician from Uttar Pradesh
- Vinod Singh (Sultanpur politician) (born 1958), Indian politician from Uttar Pradesh

== See also ==
- Vinod Kumar Singh (disambiguation)
- Vinod Singh Bansal, Indian politician
- Binod Singh, Sikh warrior
