= Jugal Kishore =

Jugal Kishore may refer to:

- Jugal Kishore (physician) (1915–2012), Indian homoeopathic physician
- Jugal Kishore (UP politician) (born 1959), Indian Uttar Pradesh politician
- Jugal Kishore Birla (1883–1967), Indian philanthropist
- Jugal Kishore Choudhury, Indian architect and urban planner
- Jugal Kishore Sharma (born 1962), Indian politician
- Thakur Jugal Kishore Sinha (1908–1980), Indian politician

== See also ==
- Kishore (name)
