= Hansmukh Rathod =

Hansmukh Rathod (born 1953) is an astrologer from Mumbai, India, who was arrested on March 22, 2009, for allegedly raping two girls since they were 12 and 9 years old. He was accompanied by Kishore Chauhan and his wife Anjana Chauhan. During police investigation he offered to compensate for the crimes by getting the younger sister married to his son.

It was alleged that Rathod had abused other girls too. The investigating police had claimed that Rathod was well connected with local politicians and had high-profile clients.

All three accused were acquitted by Thane Sessions Court on Aug 4, 2011, after the prosecution failed to establish rape.

== See also ==
- Fritzl case, a similar incident in Austria
- List of long-term false imprisonment cases
