= Chandra Kishore Shrestha =

Indian dramatist and screenwriter

Chandra Kishore Shrestha (popularly known as C.K. Shrestha) is a well-known dramatist, social worker, social thinker, political analyst, journalist, theater activist, film script writer, lyricist and a community motivator from the Darjeeling hills, India. He belongs to the Indian Gorkha community.

C.K. Shrestha has written and directed numerous plays in the Nepali language, which include Ani Bhaleymungro Runcha, Salaam Relimai, and Aina Ma Herda Ramsailee. He is the group leader of the theater troupe Bhadrey ko Toli Natya Samuha. Ani Bhaley Mungro Runcha is a social satire that was staged for 11 years in different parts of India. He has been the protagonist of 'theater for a social change' and a follower of the 'fourth theatre'. His fourth theatre play Aina Ma Herda Ramsailee was staged more than 500 times in different parts of India.

He has also written a book, the "Gorkhas' Quest for Indian Identity"on the issue of the identity crisis faced by Indian Gorkhas. As a journalist, C.K. Shrestha has edited and published a number of daily newspapers, weeklies, journals and periodicals. His main contributions include Sunchari Samachar (daily), Aba Samvad Patra (daily), Aadhar (monthly), Himali Bela (weekly) and Milekhutti (monthly magazine). He has authored many books including Darjeelingey Bhanu Jayantiko Naknik, Narad Uvanch, Hamro Love Story, Mujhe Rang De Tiranga Chola Mai, Bharatma Gorkha Haruko Rashtriya Chihnari Sankat, Gorkha's Quest for Indian Identity, Banmara, etc.

C.K. Shrestha is a former national working president of the Bharatiya Gorkha Parisangh. He is the founder of Gorkha Bharati Bichar Manch.
