= Naba Kishore Ray =

Indian theoretical and computational chemist

- Born: 5 December 1940; Odisha, India
- Died: 8 May 2013 (aged 72)
- Known for: Studies on structure of molecules
- Awards: 1983 Shanti Swarup Bhatnagar Prize
- Scientific career
- Fields: Theoretical chemistry; Computational chemistry

Naba Kishore Ray (1940- 2013) was an Indian theoretical and computational chemist, known for his studies on structure of molecules. Born on 5 December 1940 in the Indian state of Odisha, he studied molecules using molecular orbital and floating spherical gaussian orbital methods and his work on the nature of electron density and momentum distribution in atoms and molecules as well as molecular reactivitity on surfaces are reported to have widened the understanding of the subjects. The Council of Scientific and Industrial Research, the apex agency of the Government of India for scientific research, awarded him the Shanti Swarup Bhatnagar Prize for Science and Technology, one of the highest Indian science awards, in 1983, for his contributions to chemical sciences.

== See also ==
- Theoretical chemistry
- Computational chemistry
