= Kishor C. Mehta =

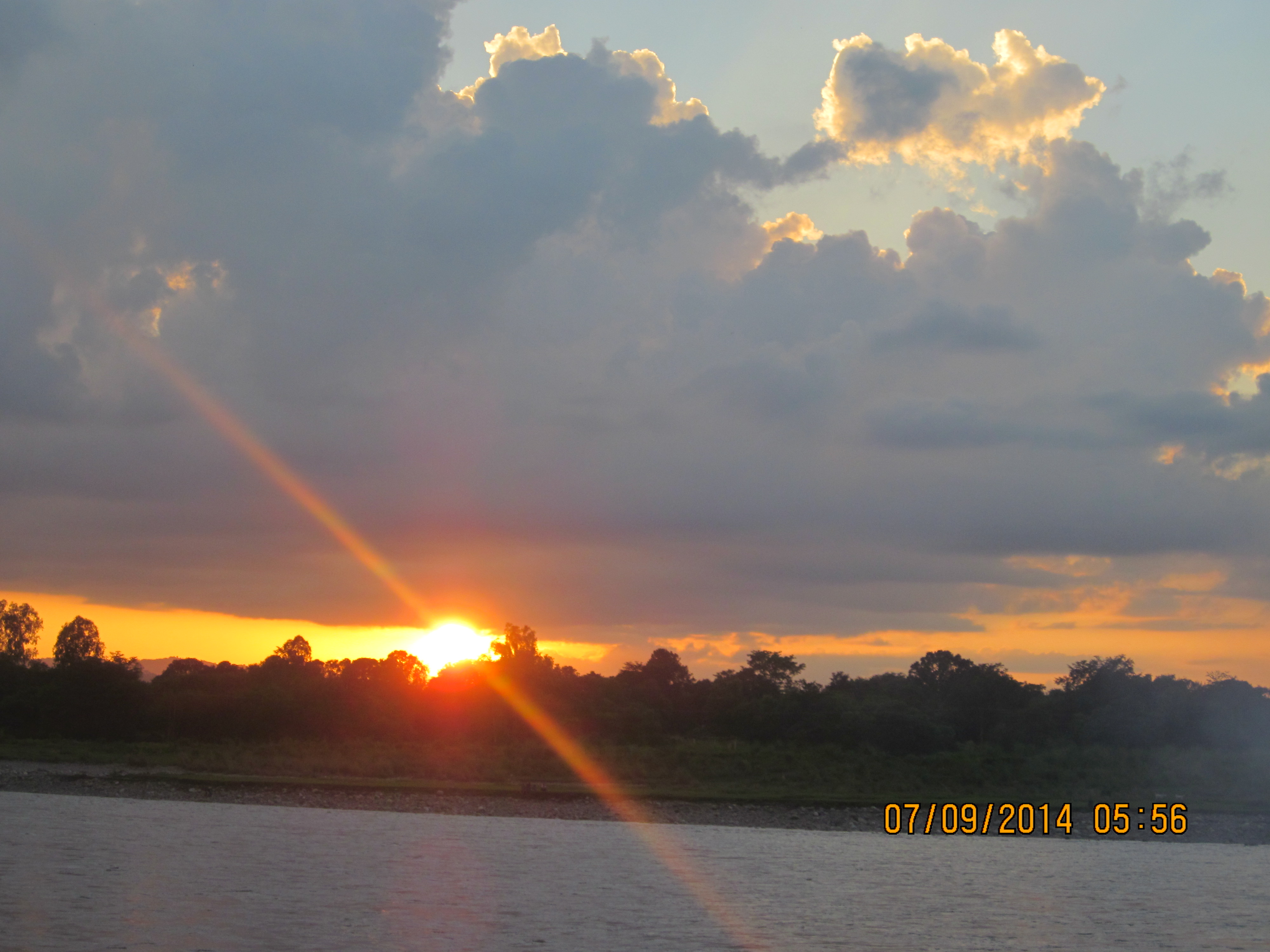
Dr. Kishor C. Mehta

Kishor C. Mehta is recognized worldwide as an authority on wind engineering. He is the first person from the Texas Tech University to be elected as a member of the National Academy of Engineering for his systematic studies of structural damage caused by windstorms and leadership in the development of structural design standards for wind loads. Mehta has chaired the American Society of Civil Engineers' task committee on wind loads and organized the 11th International Conference on Wind Engineering, held at Lubbock, Texas in June, 2003. He is also the past chairman of the National Research Council Committee on Natural Disasters.

Mehta is a P.W. Horn Professor of Civil Engineering at Texas Tech University. He is the founder and the former director of the Wind Science and Engineering Research Center at TTU.
