= Kishore Chauhan =

Kishore Chauhan (born 1949) is a man from Mumbai, India, who was arrested on March 22, 2009, for allegedly sexually abusing his daughters since they were 12 and 9 years old. Also charged were his wife Anjana Chauhan and an astrologer, Hansmukh Rathod. The older victim, aged 21, told police "I want to kill my parents".

It was alleged that Rathod had also abused other girls. The investigating police had claimed that the Rathod was well connected with local politicians and had high-profile clients.

All three accused were acquitted by Thane Sessions Court on Aug 4, 2011 after the prosecution failed to establish rape.

== See also ==
- Fritzl case, a similar incident in Austria
- List of long-term false imprisonment cases
