= Shalinee Kishore =

American electrical engineer

Shalinee Kishore (born 1974) is an American electrical engineer whose research includes wireless networks, network schedulers, and energy management for smart buildings and smart grids. She is Iacocca Chair Professor of Electrical & Computer Engineering and Director of the Institute for Cyber Physical Infrastructure & Energy at the Lehigh University P. C. Rossin College of Engineering and Applied Science.

== Education ==
Kishore studied electrical engineering at Rutgers University, earning bachelor's and master's degrees in 1996 and 1999. She then went to Princeton University, earned a second master's degree in 2001, and completed her Ph.D. in 2003. Her dissertation, Capacity and Coverage in a Two-Tier Cellular CDMA Network, was jointly supervised by Vincent Poor and Stuart Carl Schwartz.

== Recognition ==
Kishore won the Presidential Early Career Award for Scientists and Engineers in 2004, "for conducting innovative research to provide high-quality, all-encompassing wireless access to communication networks".

She won the 2016 Outstanding Service Award of the Women in Communications Engineering (WICE) Standing Committee of the IEEE Communications Society.
