= Kaushal Kishore =

Kaushal Kishore may refer to

- Kaushal Kishore (politician) (born 1960), Lok Sabha member from Mohanlalganj constituency, Uttar Pradesh
- Kaushal Kishore (scientist) (1942–1999), Indian polymer chemist
