= Mrudula Phadke =

Vice Chancellor of Maharashtra University of Health Sciences

Personal details
- Occupation: Academic

Mrudula Phadke was the Vice Chancellor of the Maharashtra University of Health Sciences.
