= Ajjarakadu Mahatma Gandhi District Stadium =

Udupi District Stadium
- District Stadium
- Interactive map of Udupi District Stadium
- Full name: Ajjarakadu Mahatma Gandhi District Stadium
- Location: Udupi, Karnataka
- Coordinates: 13.33206°N 74.74304°E
- Owner: Udupi District Sports Association
- Capacity: 10,000
- Surface: Green

Construction
- Opened: 2014
- Renovated: 2015
- Cost: ₹ 2 crore

Udupi District Stadium or Ajjarakadu Mahatma Gandhi District Stadium is a multi-purposed stadium located in Udupi, Karnataka. The stadium has capacity of 10,000 spectators. The stadium is a venue for cricket & football tournaments, fairs & exhibition. The stadium underwent a major reconstruction which cost 2 crore under Rajiv Gandhi Khel Abhiyan Mission. The stadium contains an 8-lane 400m running synthetic athletic track, a 10-lane 100m sprinting track and a 4-lane synthetic warm-up track. Inside the athletic tracks lies a Football field.
