= Vinod Kumar =

Vinod Kumar may refer to:

- Vinod Kumar Alva (born 1963), Indian actor, known as Vinod Kumar in the Telugu film industry
- Vinod Kumar (athlete) (born 1980), Indian para-athlete
- Vinod Kumar (cricketer) (born 1987), Indian cricketer
- Vinod Kumar (footballer), Indian footballer
- Vinod Kumar (politician), Indian politician
- Vinod Kumar (wrestler) (born 1965), Indian Olympic wrestler
- B. Vinod Kumar (born 1959), Indian politician

== See also ==
- Razaullah Nizamani or Abu Saifullah Khalid (died 2025), also known by the alias Vinode Kumar, a Pakistani LeT militant and leader of PMML
