= 2025 Prime Volleyball League =

- League: Prime Volleyball League
- Sport: Men's volleyball
- Duration: 02 October –26 October 2025
- Games: 38
- Teams: 10
- TV partner: Sony Sports
- Streaming partner: YouTube
- Season MVP: Joel Benjamin

Finals
- Venue: Gachibowli Indoor Stadium, Hyderabad
- Champions: Bengaluru Torpedoes
- Runners-up: Mumbai Meteors
- Finals MVP: Jishnu PV

Prime Volleyball League seasons
- ← 2024 2026 →

2025 Prime Volleyball League (also known as PVL 2025 or RuPay PVL 2025) is the fourth season of the Prime Volleyball League, a franchise based Indian indoor volleyball league, organized by Baseline Ventures.

== Format ==
Ten teams are contesting in the fourth season with the addition of Goa Guardians. There are a total of 45 matches with each team plays against each other in a single round-robin format with the top 5 teams moving into the Super 5.

== Venue ==
Gachibowli Indoor Stadium, Hyderabad will host the entire fourth season of the Prime Volleyball League.

== Club ==
=== Personnel ===
Club	Head coach	Captain	City/State	Main Sponsor
Ahmedabad Defenders		(India) Muthusamy Appavu	Ahmedabad/Gujarat	
Bengaluru Torpedoes	(United States) David Lee	(United States) Mathew West	Bengaluru/Karnataka	
Calicut Heroes	(India) Sunny Joseph	(India) Mohan Ukkrapandian	Kozhikode/Kerala	
Chennai Blitz		(India) Jerome Vinith	Chennai/Tamil Nadu	
Delhi Toofans		(India) Saqlain Tariq	New Delhi/Delhi	
Goa Guardians		(India) Chirag Yadav	Panaji/Goa	
Hyderabad Black Hawks		(Brazil) Paulo Iury Lamounier	Hyderabad/Telangana	
Kochi Blue Spikers	(India) Size Vardhan	(India)	Kochi/Kerala	
Kolkata Thunderbolts		(India)	Kolkata/West Bengal	
Mumbai Meteors		(India)	Mumbai/Maharashtra	

=== Foreign players ===
The total number of foreign players is restricted to Two per club.

Club	Player 1	Player 2
Ahmedabad Defenders	(Mongolia) Battur Batsuuri	(Venezuela) Ronald Martinez
Bengaluru Torpedoes	(United States) Jalen Penrose	(United States) Mathew West
Calicut Heroes	(Benin) Bosco Dete	(Sri Lanka) Tharusha Chamath Dilshan
Chennai Blitz	(Brazil) Luiz Felipe Perotto	(Colombia) Leandro Josh
Delhi Toofans	(Venezuela) Jesús Chourio	(Venezuela) Carlos Berrios
Goa Guardians	(United States) Nathaniel Dickinson	(United States) Jeffrey Menzel
Hyderabad Black Hawks	(Brazil) Paulo Iury Lamounier	(Brazil) Vitor Yudi
Kochi Blue Spikers	(Canada) Byron Keturakis	(Spain) Nicolas Marechal
Kolkata Thunderbolts	(Iran) Matin Takavar	(Colombia) Sebastian Giraldo
Mumbai Meteors	(Norway) Mathias Loftesnes	(Norway) Peter Ostvik

== League standings ==
1. Ten teams split into 2 pools (A&B) 2. Each team plays Seven Matches in the league stage (4 against same pool and 3 against the other pool) 3. After the league stage , top 4 move to knockouts

Pos	Team	Pld	W	L	Pts	SW	SL	SR	SPW	SPL	SPR	Qualification
1	Ahmedabad Defenders	0	0	0	0	0	0	—	0	0	—	Qualified for Super-4
2	Bengaluru Torpedoes	0	0	0	0	0	0	—	0	0	—	Qualified for Super-4
3	Calicut Heroes	0	0	0	0	0	0	—	0	0	—	Qualified for Super-4
4	Chennai Blitz	0	0	0	0	0	0	—	0	0	—	Qualified for Super-4
5	Delhi Toofans	0	0	0	0	0	0	—	0	0	—	
6	Goa Guardians	0	0	0	0	0	0	—	0	0	—	
7	Hyderabad Black Hawks	0	0	0	0	0	0	—	0	0	—	
8	Kochi Blue Spikers	0	0	0	0	0	0	—	0	0	—	
9	Kolkata Thunderbolts	0	0	0	0	0	0	—	0	0	—	
10	Mumbai Meteors	0	0	0	0	0	0	—	0	0	—	
