= Team Mangalore =

Kite designers in Karnataka, India

Team Mangalore is a group of kite enthusiasts from the Indian city of Mangalore in the state of Karnataka. The team is known for making kites of unique designs, which depict the folklore and culture of India.

Team Mangalore is known for the kites with the themes of Indian mythology, legends and ethnic designs, such as Yakshagana, Gajaraj, Garuda, Pushpaka Vimana and others. Team Mangalore is behind many kite designs out of which Kathakali, Flying Lizard, Yakshagana are the famous creations. They have participated in various international kite festivals in countries like Hong Kong, Italy, Korea, France, Thailand, United Kingdom and Sri Lanka.

== Mangalore International Kite festival ==
Team Mangalore often hosts International Kite Festivals in Panambur beach with the support of industrial giants such as ONGC, MRPL etc.

- Kite festival - 2003
- Kite festival - 2004
- ONGC International kite festival - 2005
- International Kite festival - 2012
- ONGC MRPL International kite festival - 2010

== Achievements ==
Team Mangalore Wins the 'Best International Kite' Award in the International Kite Festival held in Cleethorpes UK during June 2007.
