= Mall of Mysore =

Building in India

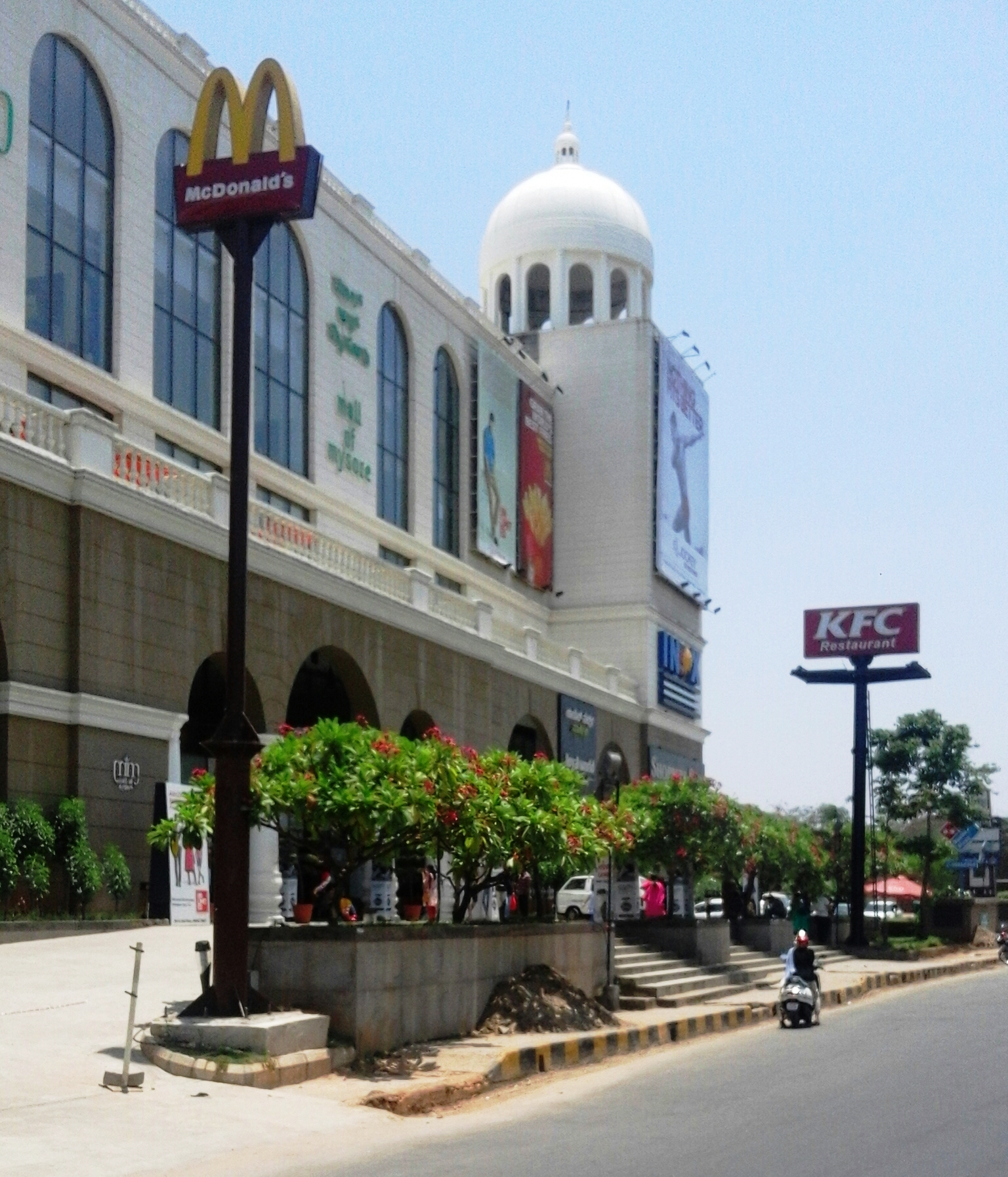
- Location: Mysore, Karnataka, India
- Coordinates: 12.297844°N 76.664631°E
- Address: Indranagar Extn, MG Road
- Opened: 2011
- Developer: DM South India Hospitality Pvt Ltd
- Num. of stores: 83
- Num. of anchor tenants: 4
- Floor area: 262,000 sq ft (24,300 m^{2})
- Floors: 5
- Website: mallofmysore.com

Mall of Mysore is a shopping mall which is one of the largest and the first of its kind in the Indian city of Mysore, Karnataka. It is located next to the Mysore Racecourse, with the Chamundi hills as a backdrop.

== History ==
Mall of Mysore is a first-of-its-kind mall in the heritage city of Mysore, the cultural capital of Karnataka. Keeping in pace with the changing perspectives and lifestyles, it is a state-of-the-art building with distinctive architecture and design featuring blends of traditional elements with modern design. It's adjacent to Radisson Blu Plaza Hotel, Mysore, which is one of the first 5-star hotels in Mysore.

== Location ==
Mall of Mysore is located ideally on the New Airport Road where it is surrounded by high-end residential neighbourhoods, the Racecourse, the Golf Course and the Famous Mysore Zoo. The mall is home to the Radisson Blu hotel with 140 modern rooms and suites.

== Facilities ==
With a shopping area of around 2,62,000 sq. feet, the Mall of Mysore is anchored by Shoppers Stop, Pantaloon, Unlimited, @home, and Reliance Digital It has a four-screen INOX multiplex, a bowling alley & other games under the Smash group.

== Gallery ==
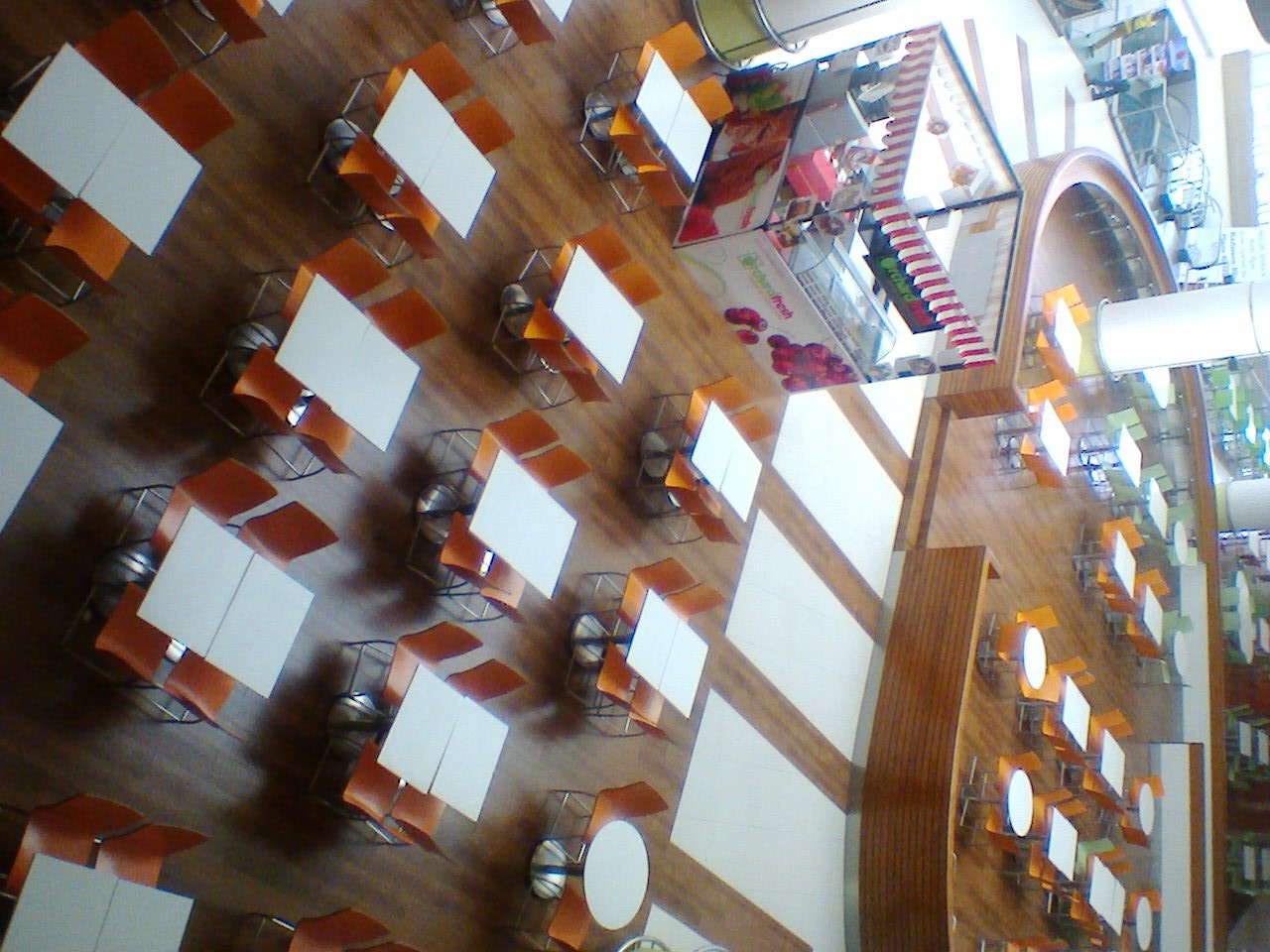
The food court inside the mall

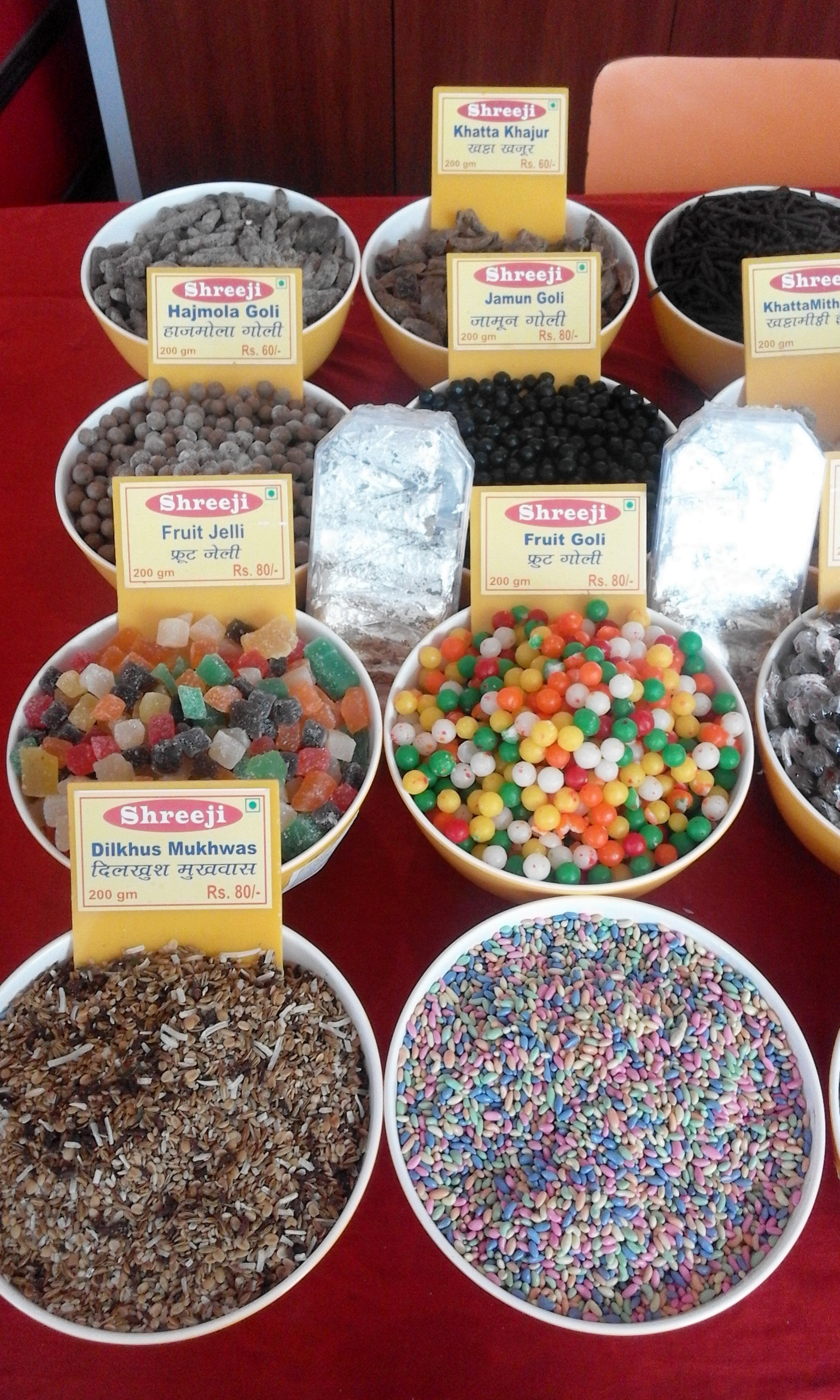
Sweetmeat shop in the mall
