= Kishor Phadke =

Indian psychologist (1936–2022)

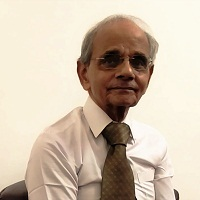
- Born: 20 February 1936; Mumbai, Maharashtra, British Raj
- Died: 31 January 2022 (aged 85); Mumbai, Maharashtra, India
- Education: Pune University
- Known for: Fundamental Contributions to the Development of Rational Emotive Behavior Therapy, Pioneer of Rational Emotive Behavior Therapy in India...
- Awards: Fellow & Supervisor, Albert Ellis Institute, New York City
- Scientific career
- Fields: Psychology, philosophy, psychotherapy

Kishor Moreshwar Phadke (20 February 1936 – 31 January 2022), also known as K. M. Phadke, was an Indian psychologist, and practitioner and trainer in Rational Emotive Behavior Therapy (REBT). He held M.A. degree in psychology from Pune University. He is first Indian psychologist who enjoys the unique distinction of being a fellow and supervisor of the Albert Ellis Institute in New York City. He is best known as a pioneer of REBT in India. Due to his distinguished contributions to REBT, Indian psychologists consigned a unique title to his therapy – Ellis-Phadke therapy. He has authored nine Marathi books, several popular articles and papers and co-authored five English books.

== Background and education ==
Kishor was born during the late British Raj on 20 February 1936 in a Maharashtrian family. The origin of his family can be traced to Haripant Phadke, who was a lieutenant general in the Darbar of Peshwas. His father was a general practitioner (MBBS) in Pune whereas his mother was a housewife. The couple had four children, two of whom have died. His uncle also served as communist leader during the freedom movement. Kishor has completed honours Degree course in philosophy and Masters course in psychology from Pune University in 1959.

== Early career ==
In 1959, Kishor began his career in Ruparel College, Mumbai. He first worked as a demonstrator, then lecturer and finally officiating professor and head of the department. After serving for 5 years in Ruparel College, he joined ATIRA as a junior scientific officer in Human Relations division. Gradually, he got promoted as a senior scientific officer which gave him an opportunity to conduct various industry research projects.

== Correspondence with Albert Ellis ==
Phadke wrote his first letter to Ellis on 29 April 1968 and the correspondence lasted for 36 years. Phadke's correspondence with Ellis is considered to be one of the finest sources for REBT learners. It is of 1351 pages (bounded in four volumes). It consists of Phadke's queries/enquiries about REBT and responses given by Ellis. Phadke had been questioning, challenging and attacking almost every aspect of theory and practice of REBT. Dr. Eliis, perhaps the world's best authority on the subject, also kept sending him various books as well as articles. In 1987, Windy Dryden, a professor of Psychotherapeutic Studies at Goldsmiths, University of London expressed his wish to see this correspondence. He was very much impressed after reading these volumes and also wrote to Phadke saying that he (Phadke) really had an insatiable desire for knowledge and his attention to detail was worthy of an academic. After Ellis' death, these volumes are preserved and cited in Archives of Columbia University.

== REBT: The life goal ==
Phadke had left ATIRA in 1969 and joined Mumbai University as a demonstrator in the Department of Psychology. He left the university in 4 years and joined as faculty at Sir Sorabji Pochkanawala Bankers Training College, Mumbai in 1973. He was aiming to spread REBT throughout India. With this vision, he resigned his teaching post at Banking college in 1981 and established his own training centre. It was named 'Phadke Centre' with the objective of imparting education for life through REBT.

== Phadke Centre ==
Phadke Centre, the first learning center of REBT in India, offered a variety of individual and group programmes founded on the principles and techniques of REBT. He created his own training modules of primary and advanced workshops for professionals as well as two day workshops for non-professionals. Thousands of trainees, more than 200 organizations organized his training programmes for their employees, about 10000 executives from all levels of management. In the contemporary transactional analysis' era, training in REBT was just inconceivable to industry. Being a pioneer, Phadke encountered considerable opposition from the start but using REBT's philosophy, he could develop an elegant model of training programmes for industries. He has delivered professional talks in various business, industrial, educational, research and training organizations.

== Challenges and struggles ==
After getting first introduction to REBT at Gujarat University, Phadke started reading books on wide range of subjects such as psychology, philosophy, literature, language, political science, economics, sociology. These books assisted him to study, investigate and deeply engage with issues and concerns related to human behaviour. During this time, he started correspondence with Dr. Ellis regarding his questions and queries. Ellis also started to send him his books and articles along with the answers. Phadke faced many problems in receiving the posts. Despite that, today he has a collection of Ellis' 76 books and more than 600 articles and research papers. Needless to mention, he has deeply studied and analysed this material. His source of learning REBT was from Ellis' books, some of which contained verbatim records of Ellis' cases. He studied numerous cases of Ellis, drew his own conclusions and compared them to those of Ellis.

== Fellow and supervisor ==
In 1977, Institute for Advanced Study in Rational Psychotherapy, (currently known as Albert Ellis Institute , New York) honored him the status of 'Fellow' and later, in 1989, he was awarded the honour of 'Supervisor'. According to the regulations of the institute of that time, the status of fellow was given to only those aspirants who had a post-doctorate in psychology and had completed two years intensive training programme of the institute. Although Phadke had neither a doctorate nor had he visited the institute, the concerned committee got convinced with significance of his work in India and made Phadke an exception to the criteria. The status of supervisor enabled him to conduct training programmes for professionals.

== Contributions to REBT ==
Absence of efficient communication system between Phadke and his mentor, Dr. Ellis, forced him to rely on his own resources and made him to innovate his own techniques of practicing REBT. This elegant method of learning resulted in new research findings in the theory and practice of REBT. Ellis praised his dedication and mastery over this subject with saying 'I still feel you are the only person in Asia that I consider to be extremely well qualified to practice and preach REBT. He has made original contributions to the theory and practice of REBT, which were greatly acknowledged by Ellis. Some of the contributions to the theory of REBT are as follows:

=== Denotation of 'D' letter ===
In the classical form, the letter 'D' in the A-B-C-D-E theory stands for the therapeutic technique of Disputing the client's irrational beliefs. Phadke expanded the letter 'D' and created modified three-fold denotation- a) Detection b) Disputation c) Discrimination. Ellis has incorporated this denotation in ABC structure of REBT.

=== Enlargement of 'B' letter ===
Phadke demonstrated to Ellis that it is incorrect to classify desires, preferences, demands and commands as Beliefs- rational or irrational. In order to incorporate the human motives in the A-B-C theory, he coined the more comprehensive term for B- Bedrock of Biosocial Forces. In the later years, he reinterpreted letter 'B' more accurately as bipartite belief system. It includes the detection of binary message which the client signals to himself as well as the bipartite belief system, implied in that message.

=== Redefinition of 'C' ===
Phadke gave a special thought to 'C' which was earlier described merely as Consequences. He precisely named it as 'Choice-blocking consequences'. In later years, he further elaborated it by making a distinction between choice freeing consequences leading to healthy emotions and choice blocking consequences leading to unhealthy emotions.

=== Extension of 'E' ===
One of the REBT proponent, Garcia suggested the letter 'E' could stand for a) Empathy b) Emotion and c) Experience. Phadke added yet another meaning to the letter E, namely Enthusiasm.

=== Modification of the Approval Principles ===
After closely observing the behavior of hundreds of people, Phadke arrived at the conclusion that the principle of Approval in REBT has to be supplemented by the Principle of Disapproval which he stated as follows: 'No one should dislike or disapprove of me for whatever I do.' Ellis graciously accepted his suggestion and it was incorporated in his subsequent presentation of masturbatory ideologies. Phadke went further and suggested a two-fold classification of masturbatory ideologies instead of three. 1. What I should get, feel and do. 2. What I should not have to get, feel and do. This classification made the work of detecting the irrational beliefs easy

=== Review of Rationality ===
Phadke pointed out that five criteria of rational behavior proposed in REBT were not sufficiently comprehensive. They seemed to omit a vital aspect of man's behavior towards others. In order to cover that aspect, he suggested an additional criterion- Rational behavior does no needless, definite and deliberate harm to others

=== Emotive-Rational Therapy ===
Phadke proposed that the distinction between Rational Emotive Therapy (RET) and Emotive Rational Therapy (ERT) can generate at least verifiable hypotheses. He further elaborated that the clients' irrational beliefs about himself may be disputed by using ERT whereas the clients' irrational beliefs about others and the world may be disputed effectively by using RET. RET is more effective in disputing the client's inferences whereas ERT is more effective in disputing the client's evaluations

=== New format of teaching REBT ===
Phadke devised 8A format of presenting the basic principles of REBT. A1 to A4 are used for detection of psychopathology and A5 to A8 are used for the treatment. Brief outline of this format is as follows: A1- Assumption A2-Appraisal A3-Agony A4-Astray A5-Articulate A6-Attack A7-Attune A8-Adjust

=== Theory of surplus values ===
This term was devised by Phadke to his intervention strategies to suit the client's background. Usage of this term makes easy for the practitioner to make the clients understand the surplus value they are attaching to some events in their life

=== Others ===
Phadke invented many innovative practices of REBT which are as follows:

1. Effective way of teaching the meaning of awful, horrible or terrible
2. The Devil's Advocate- An exercise in Rational Thinking
3. The involvement Debate
4. Refinement of Rational-Emotive-Imagery
5. Empathic Role Play
6. Role Reversal
7. A Second-Order Cognitive Therapeutic Technique
8. Emotive technique of controlling one's emotions and behaviour

Some of these techniques were used effectively for the advancement of the practice of REBT. This was clearly displayed when psychologists from California acknowledged that the technique of role reversal devised by Phadke was an effective assessment technique to increase awareness of faulty perceptions of reality.

== Later life and death ==
At the age of 71, Phadke decided to retire from all of his professional activities, including the closing of Phadke Centre. Dr. Ellis, in his autobiography – All Out!, has written about the unusual influence of Phadke on him. Ellis says: 'One of the most unusual influences on me and my work has been that of the psychologist Kishor M. Phadke, of Mumbai, India. I would never have figured out some of the finer points of REBT without his detailed questioning, and I want to thank him for that....He has certainly been one of my finest friends and supporters since 1968.'

In 2015, Phadke relocated to Shivaji Park, Mahim, upon his retirement. For a few years, he had been suffering from Parkinson's disease. He died on 31 January 2022, at the age of 85.

== Published works ==
=== Books authored ===
- Joshi, A., & Phadke, K.M. (2018). Rational Emotive Behaviour Therapy Integrated. (1st ed.) New Delhi, India: Sage Publications.
- Phadke, K.M. & Joshi, A. (2018). Albert Ellis Vichardarshan (1st ed.). Mumbai, India: Shabd Publications.
- Phadke, K.M. (2014). Udyojakanche Antarang (3rd reprint). Pune, India: Majestic Prakashan.
- Phadke, K.M. (2009). Alasavar Mat (2nd ed.). Mumbai, India: Tridal Prakashan.
- Phadke, K.M. (2005). Karmacharyansathi Samupadeshan (1st ed.). Mumbai, India: Majestic Prakashan.
- Khear, R., & Phadke, K.M. (2001). The Inner World of Entrepreneurs. Mumbai, India: Pauline Publications.
- Phadke, K.M. (2000). Mnachkshunche Samarthya. (2nd reprint). Mumbai, India: Tridal Prakashan.
- Phadke, K.M. (1999). Adhunik Sanjivani. (2nd ed.). Mumbai, India: Tridal Prakashan.
- Phadke, K.M. & Chulani, V. (1999).The Power of Your Mind's Eye. Mumbai, India: Pauline Publications.
- Phadke, K.M. & Chulani, V. (1999). Conquering Laziness.New Delhi, India: Excel Books.
- Phadke, K.M. & Chulani, V. (1998). Liberation form Addiction. Mumbai, India: Himalaya Publishing House.
- Phadke, K.M. & Khear, R. (1998). Counselling in Industry: A Rational Approach. Mumbai, India: Himalaya Publishing House.
- Phadke, K.M. (1997). Vikretyanche Antarang (1st ed.). Mumbai, India: Tridal Prakashan.
- Phadke, K.M. (1995). Kathin Samaya Yeta. (1st ed.). Mumbai, India: Tridal Prakashan.
- Phadke, K.M. (1995). Vyasanmukti. (1st ed.). Mumbai, India : Tridal Prakashan.
- Phadke, K.M. (1996). Chakram Manashanshi Kase Vagave? (2nd Reprint). Mumbai, India: Tridal Prakashan.

=== Articles authored ===
- Phadke, K.M. (2008). Kame ka Rengaltat? Part III. Vyapari Mitra, (May Issue), pp. 583–585.
- Phadke, K.M. (2008). Kame ka Rengaltat? Part II. Vyapari Mitra, (March Issue), pp. 357–359.
- Phadke, K.M. (2008). Kame ka Rengaltat?. Part I. Vyapari Mitra, (Jan Issue), pp. 103–104.
- Phadke, K.M. (2007). Sukhacha Mulmatra. Weekly Sadhana, (Oct Issue), pp. 18–21.
- Phadke, K.M. (2003). Asahishuteche Durlakshit Parinam. Ajcha Sudharak, (May Issue), pp. 64–69.
- Phadke, K.M. (2003). Vaicharik Nirbharata ani Manasik Arogya. Palakniti, (April Issue), pp. 5–9.
- Phadke, K.M. (2003). Shala: Ek Abhinav Prayog, Part II. Ajcha Sudharak, (March Issue), pp. 463–469.
- Phadke, K.M. (2003). Shala: Ek Abhinav Prayog. Part I Ajcha Sudharak, (February Issue), pp. 430–436.
- Phadke, K.M. (1982). Some Innovations in RET Theory and Practice. Rational Living. 17(2), pp. 25–29.
- Phadke, K.M. (1976). Entrepreneurship Development: A Rational Approach. Handbook of Entrepreneurship. Maharashtra Small Scale Industry's Development Corporation,.
- Phadke, K.M. (1972). Mardhekaranchya Saundaryamimansechi Manasshastriya Bhumika. Satyakatha, (Oct Issue), 18–26.
- Phadke, K.M. (1970). Rational Behaviour Training for the New Banker. Indian Institute of Bankers Journal.,
- Phadke, K.M. (1968). An Exploratory Study of the Personality Profile of Some Indian Scientific Researchers. Indian Academy of Applied Psychology. 5(2), pp. 65–72.
