= Vinod Phadke =

Indian politician and cricket administrator

Vinod Phadke is an Indian politician and cricket administrator for Goa. He is member of the Maharashtrawadi Gomantak Party. He is Goa Cricket Association secretary was arrested for alleged misappropriation of BCCI funds.

He was also team manager of the Indian cricket team when South African cricket team toured to India in 2015–16.
