= Mysore Race Course =

Indian race course

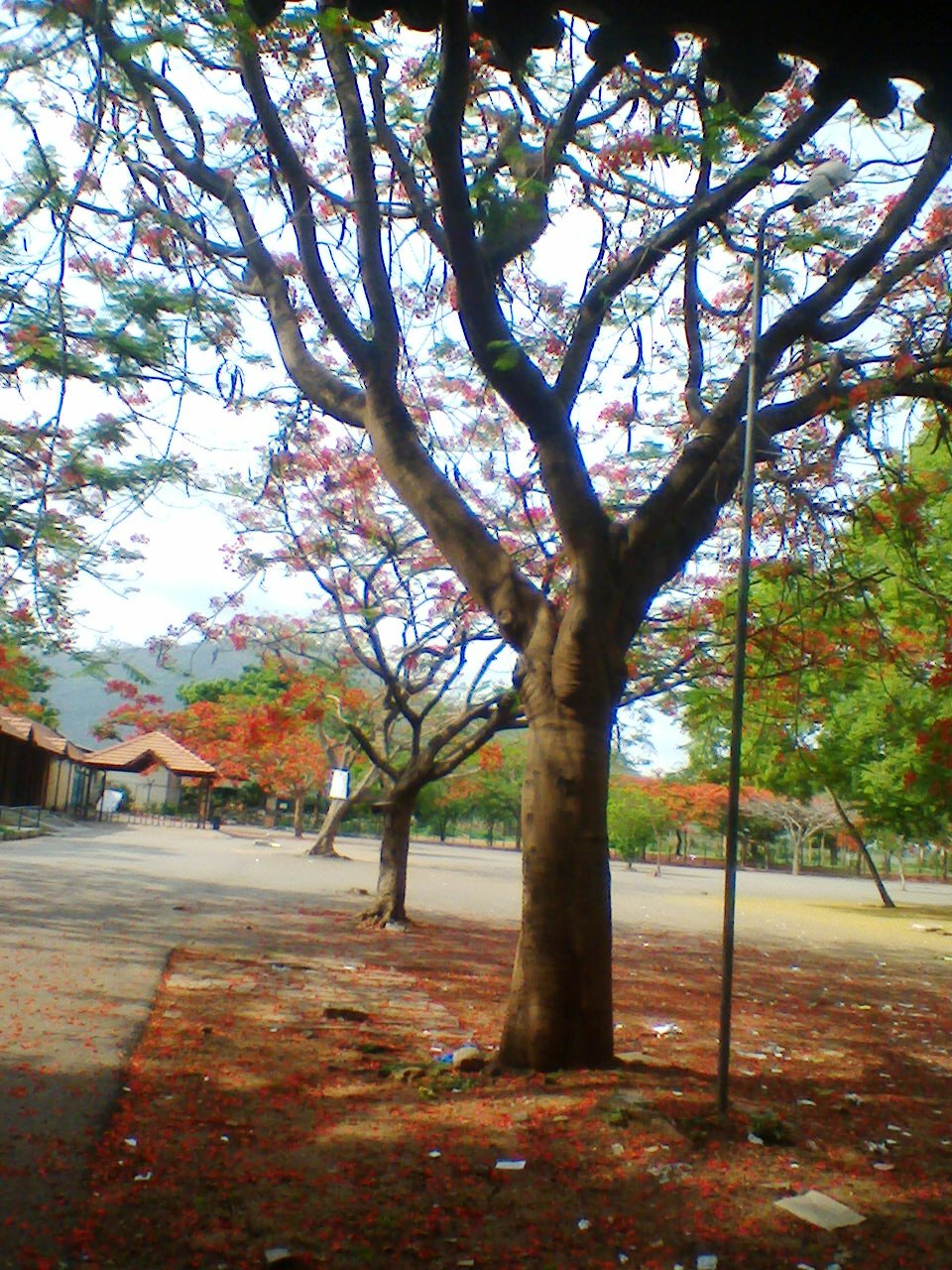
- Mysore Race Course
- Interactive map of Mysore Race Course
- Location: Mysore, India
- Coordinates: 12.29707°N 76.69813°E
- Owned by: Mysore Race Club
- Date opened: 1920

Mysore Race Course is a racing track in Mysore city of Karnataka province, India.

== History ==
Mysore Race Course was started in 1891 by the king of Mysore Chamaraja Wadiyar. The original location of the Race Course was near the present J.C.College. In 1920 a new race course was built on a 152-acre (62 ha) land. The races were affiliated to the Royal Calcutta Turf Club. The Bangalore Race Club was formed in 1951 and started to run the Mysore races also. The present race course was leased from the Karnataka government in the year 1977. The new facility of the race course at the foot of the Chamundi hills was built by Krishnaraja Wadiyar in 1906.

== Facilities ==
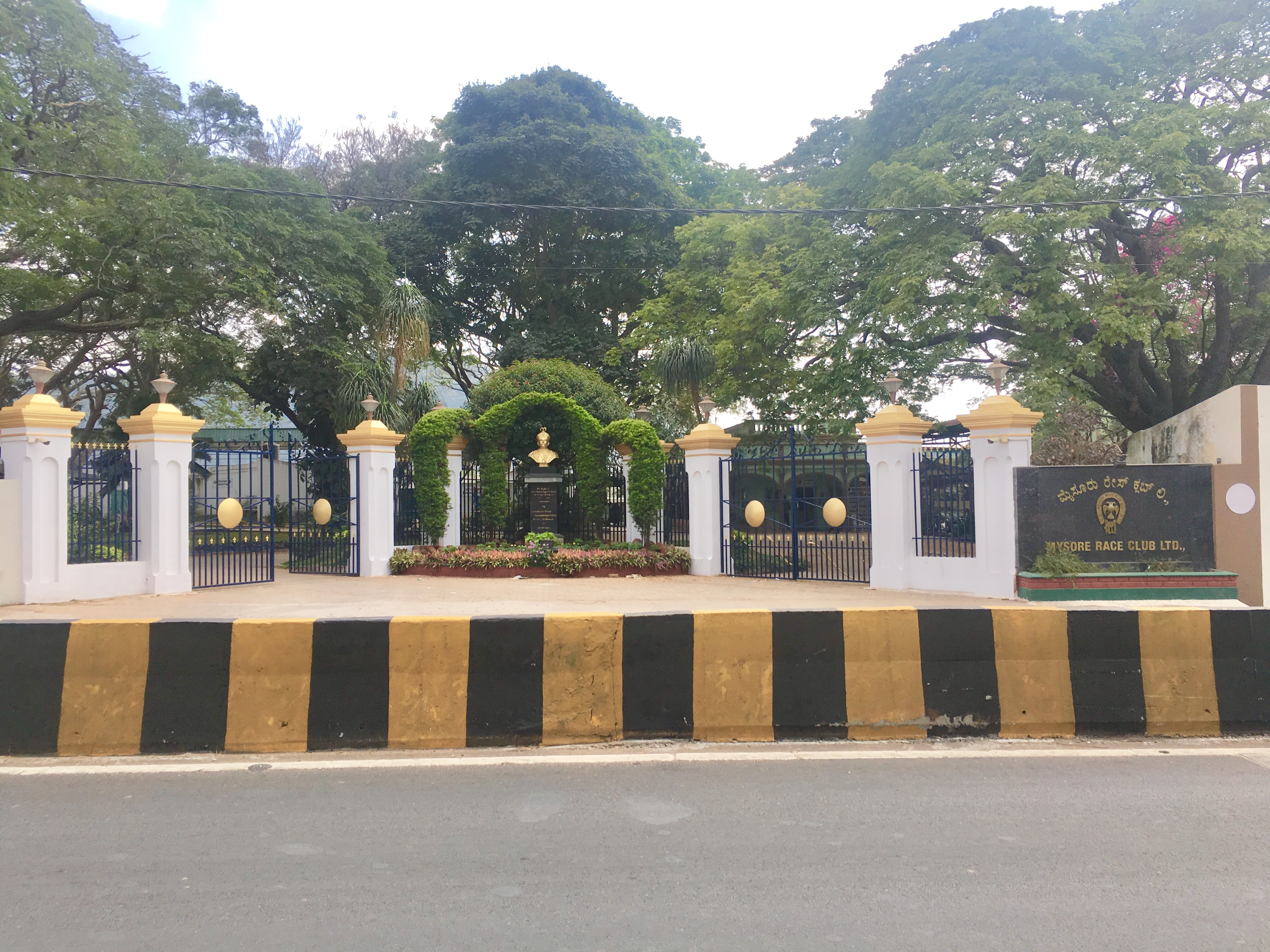
Mysore Race Club

There are 250 members in the Mysore Race Club. The racing track is 2,000 meters long and 30 meters wide. The straight is 500 meters.

== The season ==
The Mysore Derby season is from November to February and again from May to July.

== See also ==
- Lalithadripura

== Image gallery ==
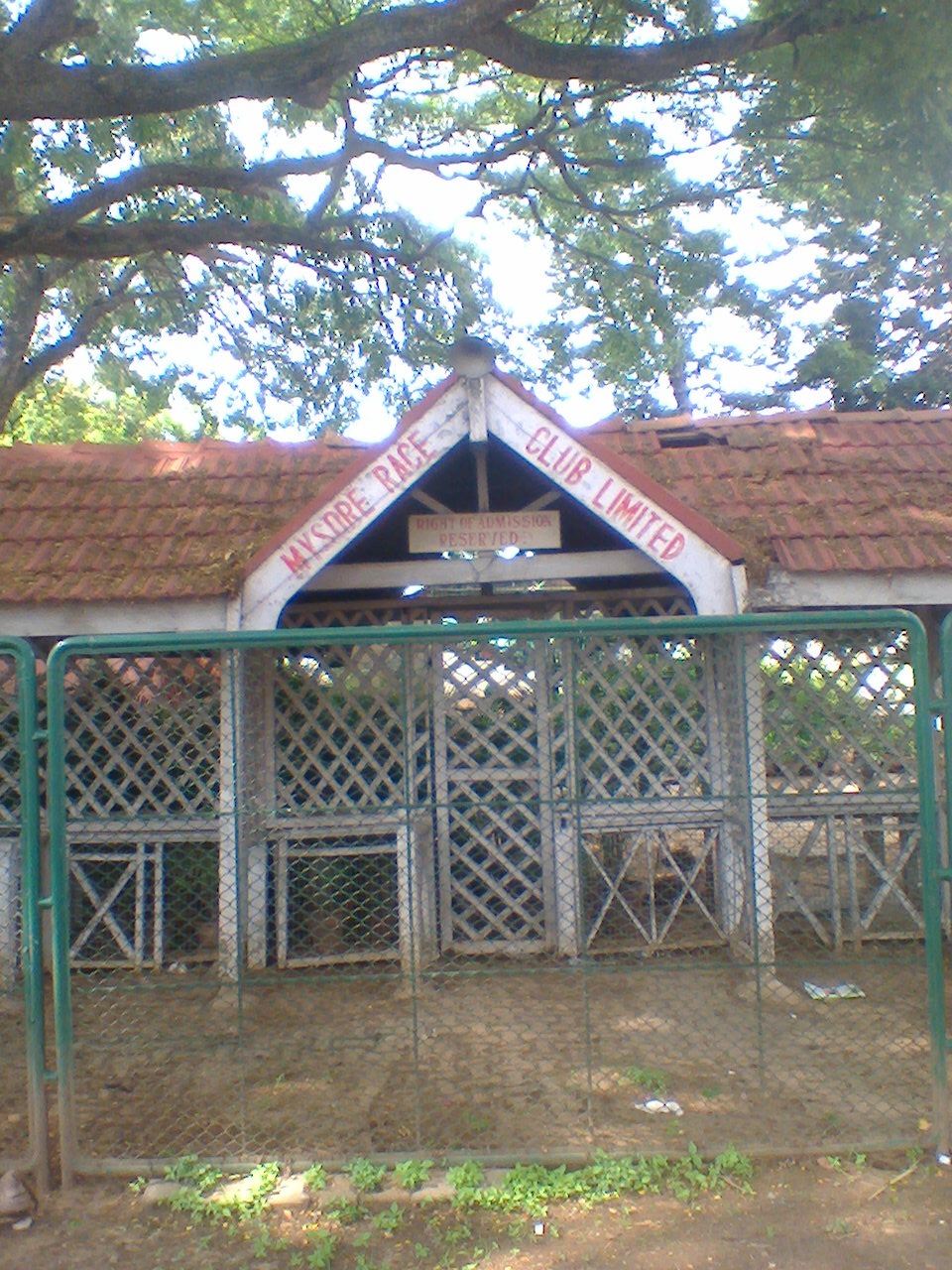
Old Entrance

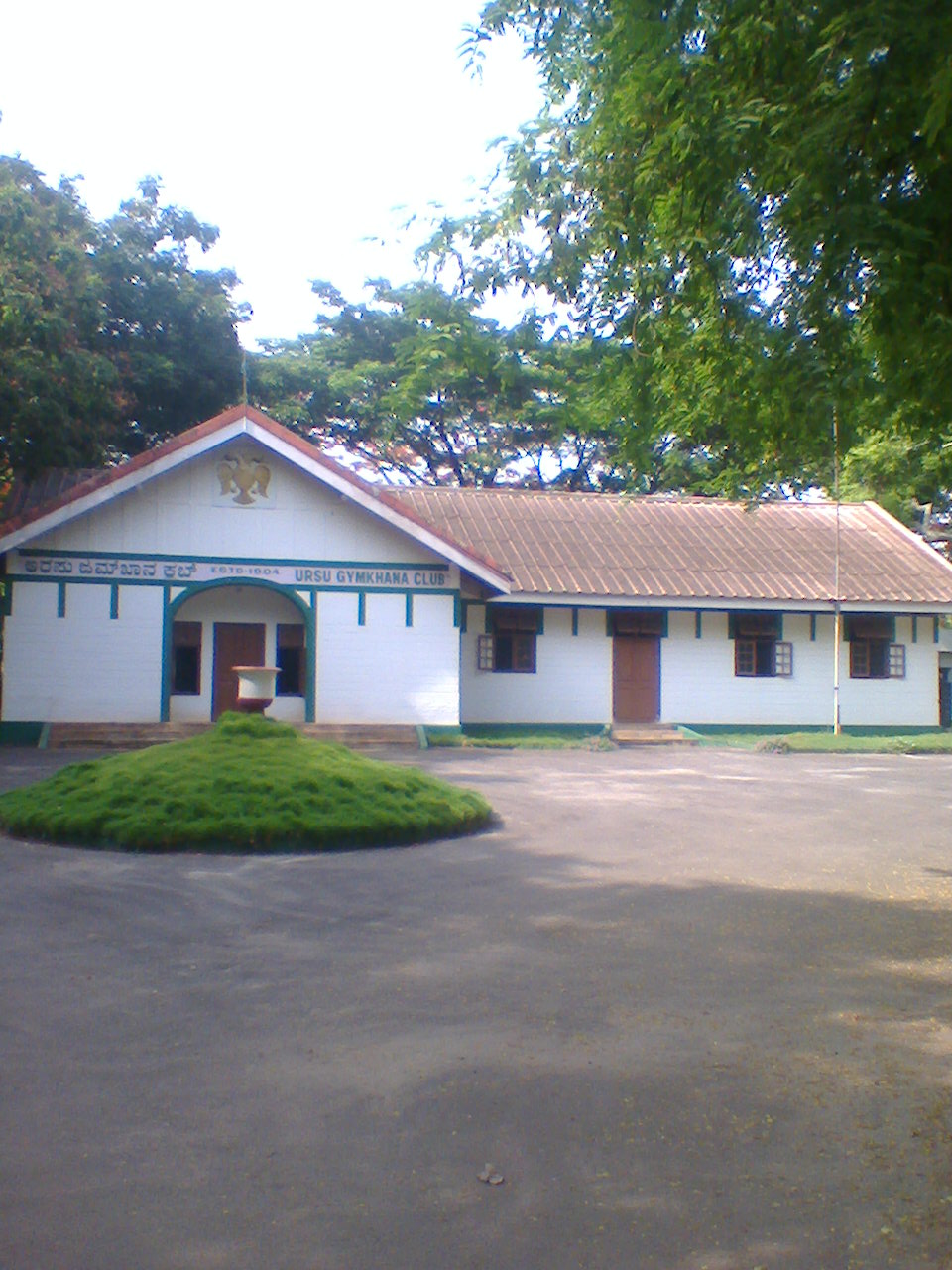
Gymkhana Club
