= Vinoth Kumar =

Indian footballer

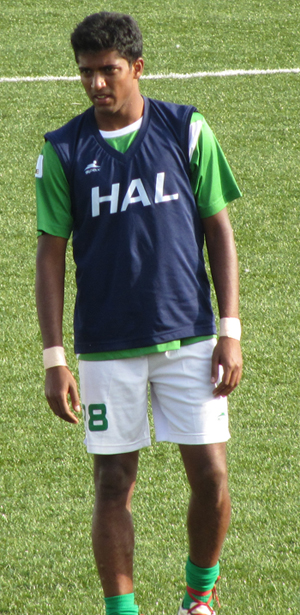

Personal information
- Full name: Vinoth Kumar V
- Date of birth: 14 June 1994 (age 32)
- Place of birth: Karnataka, India
- Position: Midfielder

Youth career
- Rail Wheel Factory

Senior career*
Years	Team	Apps	(Gls)
2011–2013	HAL		
2013	South United		
- Reserve Bank of India
- * Club domestic league appearances and goals

Vinoth Kumar V (born 14 June 1994) is a retired Indian professional footballer who played as a midfielder.

== Club career ==
Born in Karnataka, Vinoth began his career with Rail Wheel Factory and representing his state in the B.C. Roy Trophy, an under-19 state tournament. During the 2010–11 season, Kumar played for Rail Wheel Factory in the Bangalore Super Division. He was then signed to a professional contract by Hindustan Aeronautics Limited for the I-League on 22 August 2011.

On 22 October 2011, Kumar made his professional debut for HAL in their I-League opening round match against Chirag United Kerala. He started the match alongside forward Jagaba Hamza as HAL were defeated 1–0.

HAL were eventually relegated at the end of the season but Kumar stayed with the club in the Bangalore Super Division. Kumar scored his first goal of the season on 13 December 2012 against South United. His goal was the second in a 2–1 victory. He then scored a hat-trick in his next match against Students Union on 19 December 2012 in a 5–1 victory. Kumar then scored his second hat-trick of the season on 11 January 2013 against DYSS Football Academy as part of another 5–1 victory. Kumar would go on to end the season with 10 goals as HAL secured the local league title by defeating South United in the final.

In February 2013, it was announced that Kumar had signed with South United for the I-League 2nd Division campaign. He scored his first goal for the club on 20 March 2013 against Hindustan in a 2–0 victory. He then scored his third goal of the campaign three days later on 23 March against Eagles. South United would go on to win 4–0.

After the season, Kumar eventually joined Reserve Bank of India while also playing for Karnataka in the Santosh Trophy.

== Honours ==
HAL

- Bangalore Super Division: 2012–13
