= Bengaluru Torpedoes =

Indian volleyball team

- Nickname: Purple Storm
- Founded: 2021; 5 years ago
- Owner: Limitless Human Performance
- Head coach: David Lee
- Captain: Matthew West
- League: Prime Volleyball League
- 2025: Champions
- Championships: 1 (2025)

Uniforms
Home	Away

Bengaluru Torpedoes is a men's volleyball team from Bengaluru, Karnataka playing in the Prime Volleyball League in India. The team was founded in 2021 and owned by Limitless Human Performance.

== Team ==
Team roster 2022
No.	Name	Position
23	(Bulgaria) Tsvetalin Tsvetanov	Attacker
7	(India) Sethu T R	Attacker
5	(India) Nisam Mohammed	Attacker
13	(India) Srajan U Shetty	Blocker
20	(India) Mujeeb M C	Blocker
17	(India) Jishnu T V	Blocker
11	(India) Sudheer Shetty	Blocker
18	(Iran) Alireza Abalooch	Universal
4	(India) Ibin Jose	Universal
6	(India) Pankaj Sharma (C)	Attacker
15	(India) Vinayak Rokhade	Setter
10	(India) B Midhun Kumar	Libero
14	(India) Vysakh Renjith	Setter
8	(India) Tharun Gowda	Attacker
8	(India) Ganesh K Gowda	Attacker

== Administration and support staff ==
Position	Name
Owner	Limitless Human Performance
Head coach	(United States) David Lee
Assistant coach	(India) Lijo Jose
Team manager	(India) Sarang Shanthilal
General manager	(India) Rakesh Haridas
