= Dravidian peoples =

South Asian ethnolinguistic group

- Distribution of the Dravidian languages

Total population
- c. 250 million

Languages
- Dravidian languages

Religion
- Predominantly Hinduism, Dravidian folk religion and others: Jainism, Buddhism, Islam, Christianity, Judaism

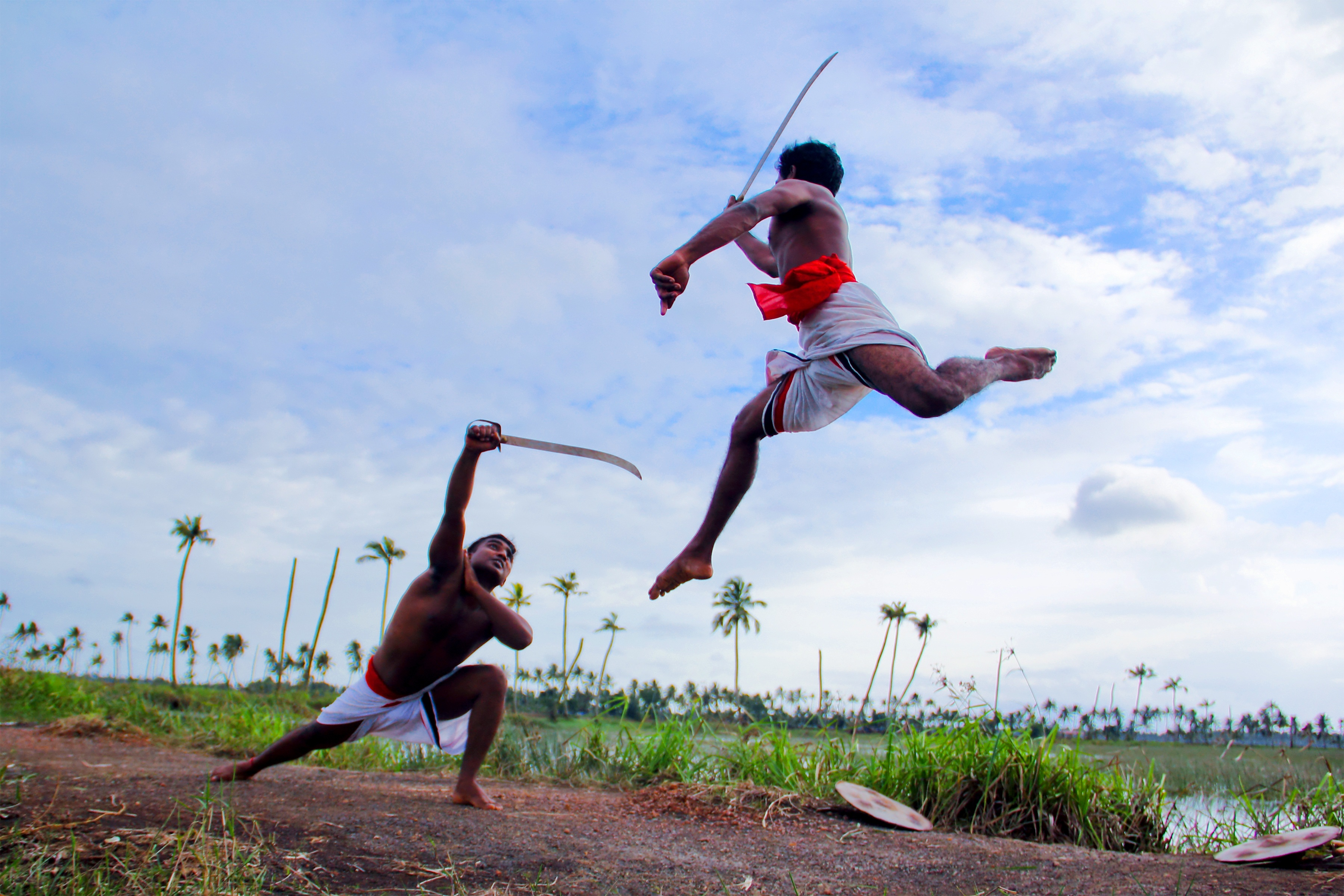
Dravidian men performing the Kerala Dravidian native martial art, Kalaripayattu.

The Dravidian peoples, Dravidian-speakers or Dravidians, are a collection of ethnolinguistic groups native to South Asia who speak Dravidian languages. There are around 250 million native speakers of Dravidian languages. The two largest Dravidian groups are the Telugus (c. 95 million) and Tamils (c. 85 million). The next three largest are the Kannadigas (c. 44 million), Malayalis (c. 40 million), and Gondis (c. 13 million). India's 22 scheduled languages include these four Dravidian languages: Telugu, Tamil, Kannada, and Malayalam. Dravidian speakers form the majority of the population of South India and are native to India, Pakistan, Afghanistan, Bangladesh, the Maldives, Nepal, Bhutan and Sri Lanka. Dravidian peoples are also present in Singapore, Mauritius, Malaysia, France, South Africa, Myanmar, East Africa, the Caribbean, and the United Arab Emirates through migration.

Proto-Dravidian may have been spoken in the Indus civilisation, suggesting a "tentative date of Proto-Dravidian around the early part of the third millennium BCE", after which it branched into various Dravidian languages. South Dravidian I (including pre-Tamil) and South Dravidian II (including pre-Telugu) split around the eleventh century BCE, with the other major branches splitting off at around the same time.

The origins of the Dravidians are a "very complex subject of research and debate". They are regarded as indigenous to the Indian subcontinent, but may have deeper pre-Neolithic roots from Western Asia, specifically from the Iranian plateau. Their origins are often viewed as being connected with the Indus Valley Civilisation, hence people and language spread east and southwards after the demise of the Indus Valley Civilisation in the early second millennium BCE, some propose not long before the arrival of Indo-Aryan speakers, with whom they intensively interacted. Some scholars have argued that the Dravidian languages may have been brought to India by migrations from the Iranian plateau in the fourth or third millennium BCE or even earlier. However, reconstructed proto-Dravidian vocabulary suggests that the family is indigenous to India.

Genetically, the ancient Indus Valley people were composed of a primarily Iranian hunter-gatherers (or farmers) ancestry, with varying degrees of ancestry from a proposed ancient South Asian hunter-gatherer component (termed the AASI). The modern-day Dravidian-speakers are composed primarily of the Indus Valley ancestry with varying levels of extra AASI ancestry depending on the community, as well carrying a small portion of Western Steppe Herder ancestry.

The third century BCE onwards saw the development of many great empires in South India like Pandya, Chola, Chera, Pallava, Satavahana, Chalukya, Kakatiya and Rashtrakuta. Medieval South Indian guilds and trading organisations like the "Ayyavole of Karnataka and Manigramam" played an important role in the Southeast Asia trade, and the cultural Indianisation of the region.

Dravidian visual art is dominated by stylised temple architecture in major centres, and the production of images on stone and bronze sculptures. The sculpture dating from the Chola period has become notable as a symbol of Hinduism. The Sri Ranganathaswamy Temple located in Indian state of Tamil Nadu is often considered as the largest functioning Hindu temple in the world. The temple is built in Dravidian style and occupies an area of 156 acres (631,000 m^{2}).

== Etymology ==
The origin of the Sanskrit word drāviḍa is Tamil. In Prakrit, words such as "Damela", "Dameda", "Dhamila" and "Damila", which later evolved from "Tamila", could have been used to denote an ethnic identity. In the Sanskrit tradition, the word drāviḍa was also used to denote the geographical region of South India. Epigraphic evidence of an ethnic group termed as such is found in ancient India and Sri Lanka where a number of inscriptions have come to light datable from the 2nd century BCE mentioning Damela or Dameda persons. The Hathigumpha inscription of the Kalinga ruler Kharavela refers to a T(ra)mira samghata (Confederacy of Tamil rulers) dated to 150 BCE. It also mentions that the league of Tamil kingdoms had been in existence for 113 years by that time. In Amaravati in present-day Andhra Pradesh there is an inscription referring to a Dhamila-vaniya (Tamil trader) datable to the 3rd century CE. Another inscription of about the same time in Nagarjunakonda seems to refer to a Damila. A third inscription in Kanheri Caves refers to a Dhamila-gharini (Tamil householder). In the Buddhist Jataka story known as Akiti Jataka there is a mention to Damila-rattha (Tamil dynasty).

While the English word Dravidian was first employed by Robert Caldwell in his book of comparative Dravidian grammar based on the usage of the Sanskrit word drāviḍa in the work Tantravārttika by Kumārila Bhaṭṭa, the word drāviḍa in Sanskrit has been historically used to denote geographical regions of southern India as whole. Some theories concern the direction of derivation between tamiḻ and drāviḍa; such linguists as Zvelebil assert that the direction is from tamiḻ to drāviḍa.

== Ethnic groups ==
The largest Dravidian ethnic groups are the Telugus from Andhra Pradesh and Telangana, the Tamilians from Tamil Nadu and Sri Lanka, the Kannadigas from Karnataka, and the Malayalis from Kerala.

Name	Subgroup	Population	Notes
Badagas	South Dravidian	133,500 (2011 census)	Badagas are found in Tamil Nadu.
Brahuis	North Dravidian	700,000 (1996)	Brahuis are mostly found in the Balochistan region of Pakistan, with smaller numbers in southwestern Afghanistan.
Chenchus	South-Central Dravidian	65,000	Chenchus are found in Andhra Pradesh, Telangana, and Odisha.
Irula	South Dravidian	203,382 (2011 census)	Irula are found in Tamil Nadu, Kerala
Giraavarus	South Dravidian (linguistically Indo-Aryan)	0 < 100 (extinct)	Giraavaru people were found in Maldives.
Gondis	Central Dravidian	13 million (approx.)	Gondi belong to the central Dravidian subgroup. They are spread over the states of Madhya Pradesh, Maharashtra, Chhattisgarh, Uttar Pradesh, Telangana, Andhra Pradesh, Bihar and Odisha. A state named Gondwana was proposed to represent them in India.
Khonds	South-Central Dravidian	1,627,486 (2011 census)	Khonds are found in Odisha.
Kannadigas	South Dravidian	43.7 million	Kannadigas are native to Karnataka in India but a considerable population is also found in Maharashtra, Tamil Nadu, Andhra Pradesh, Telangana and Kerala.
Kodavas	South Dravidian	160,000 (approx.)	Kodavas are native to the Kodagu district.
Koyas	Central Dravidian		found in Andhra Pradesh and Odisha
Kurukh	North Dravidian	3.6 million (approx.)	Kurukh are spread over parts of the states of Chhatishgarh, Jharkhand and Odisha.
Kurumbar	South Dravidian	N/A	Kurumbar are found in Tamil Nadu, Karnataka and Andhra Pradesh.
Malayalis	South Dravidian	45 million	Malayalis are native to Kerala and Lakshadweep, but are also found in Puducherry and parts of Tamil Nadu. They are also found in large numbers in Middle East countries, the Americas and Australia.
Paniya	South Dravidian	N/A	Paniya are found in Kerala and Tamil Nadu.
Tamils	South Dravidian	78 million	Tamils are native to Tamil Nadu, Puducherry and northern and eastern Sri Lanka, but are also found in parts of Kerala, Karnataka and Andhra Pradesh, although they have a large diaspora and are also widespread throughout many countries including South Africa, Singapore, the United States of America, Canada, Fiji, Indonesia, Vietnam, Cambodia, Philippines, Mauritius, European countries, Guyana, Suriname, French Guiana and Malaysia, as are the other three major Dravidian languages.
Telugus	Central Dravidian	85.1 million	Telugus are native to Andhra Pradesh, Telangana and Yanam (Puducherry), but are also found in parts of Tamil Nadu, Karnataka, Orissa and Maharashtra. Further, they have a large diaspora and are also widespread throughout many countries including the United States of America, Canada, Australia and European countries. Telugu is the fastest growing language in the United States.
Todas	South Dravidian	2,002 (2011 census)	Todas are found in Tamil Nadu.
Tuluvas	South Dravidian	2 million (approx.)	Tuluvas are found in coastal Karnataka and Northern Kerala (Kasaragodu district) in India. A state named Tulu Nadu was proposed to represent them in India.

== Language ==
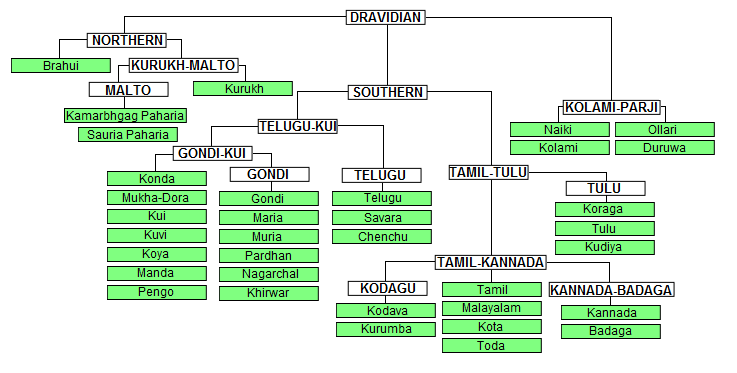
Dravidian language tree

The Dravidian language family is one of the oldest in the world. Six languages are currently recognised by India as Classical languages and four of them are Dravidian languages Tamil, Telugu, Kannada and Malayalam.

The most commonly spoken Dravidian languages are Telugu (తెలుగు), Tamil (தமிழ்), Kannada (ಕನ್ನಡ), Malayalam (മലയാളം), Brahui (براہوئی), Tulu (തുളു), Gondi and Coorg. There are three subgroups within the Dravidian language family: North Dravidian, Central Dravidian, and South Dravidian, matching for the most part the corresponding regions in the Indian subcontinent.

Dravidian grammatical impact on the structure and syntax of Indo-Aryan languages is considered far greater than the Indo-Aryan grammatical impact on Dravidian. Some linguists explain this anomaly by arguing that Middle Indo-Aryan and New Indo-Aryan were built on a Dravidian substratum. There are also hundreds of Dravidian loanwords in Indo-Aryan languages, and vice versa.

According to David McAlpin and his Elamo-Dravidian hypothesis, the Dravidian languages were brought to India by immigration into India from Elam, located in present-day southwestern Iran. In the 1990s, Renfrew and Cavalli-Sforza have also argued that Proto-Dravidian was brought to India by farmers from the Iranian part of the Fertile Crescent, (Note: Derenko: "The spread of these new technologies has been associated with the dispersal of Dravidian and Indo-European languages in southern Asia. It is hypothesized that the proto-Elamo-Dravidian language, most likely originated in the Elam province in southwestern Iran, spread eastwards with the movement of farmers to the Indus Valley and the Indian sub-continent." Derenko refers to: * Renfrew (1987), Archaeology and Language: The Puzzle of Indo-European Origins * Renfrew (1996), Language families and the spread of farming. In: Harris DR, editor, The origins and spread of Agriculture and Pastoralism in Eurasia, pp. 70–92 * Cavalli-Sforza, Menozzi, Piazza (1994), The History and Geography of Human Genes.) but more recently Heggerty and Renfrew noted that "McAlpin's analysis of the language data, and thus his claims, remain far from orthodoxy", adding that Fuller finds no relation of Dravidian language with other languages, and thus assumes it to be native to India. Renfrew and Bahn conclude that several scenarios are compatible with the data, and that "the linguistic jury is still very much out."

As a proto-language, the Proto-Dravidian language is not itself attested in the historical record. Its modern conception is based solely on reconstruction. It is suggested that the language was spoken in the 4th millennium BCE, and started disintegrating into various branches around 3rd millennium BCE. According to Krishnamurti, Proto-Dravidian may have been spoken in the Indus civilisation, suggesting a "tentative date of Proto-Dravidian around the early part of the third millennium." Krishnamurti further states that South Dravidian I (including pre-Tamil) and South Dravidian II (including pre-Telugu) split around the eleventh century BCE, with the other major branches splitting off at around the same time.

== History ==
=== Origins ===
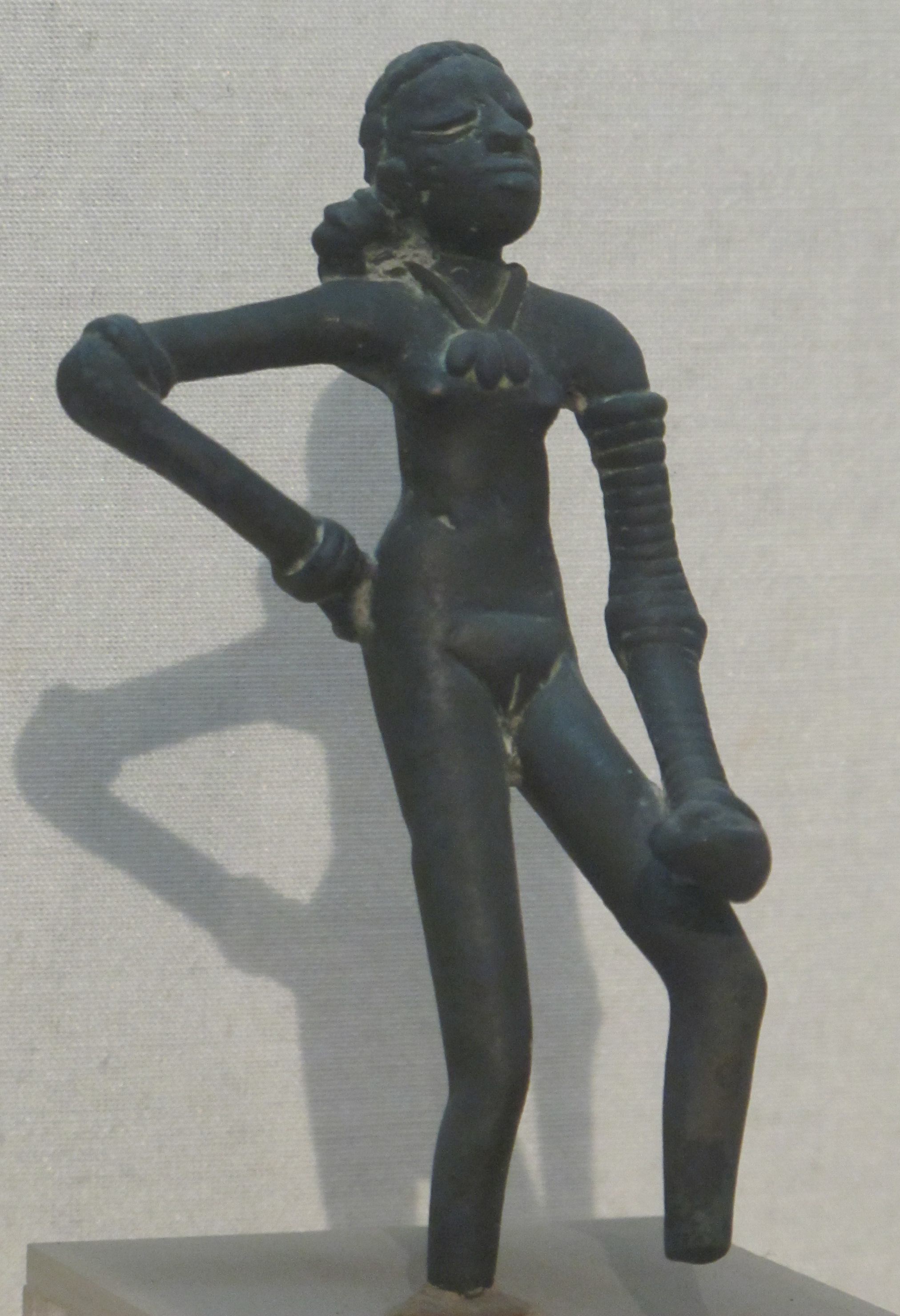
The Dancing Girl, a prehistoric bronze sculpture made in approximately 2500 BCE in the Indus Valley Civilisation city of Mohenjo-daro.

The origins of the Dravidians are a "very complex subject of research and debate". They are regarded as indigenous to the Indian subcontinent, but may have deeper pre-Neolithic roots from Western Asia, specifically from the Iranian plateau. Their origins are often viewed as being connected with the Indus Valley Civilisation, hence people and language spread east and southwards after the demise of the Indus Valley Civilisation in the early second millennium BCE, some propose not long before the arrival of Indo-Aryan speakers, with whom they intensively interacted. Though some scholars have argued that the Dravidian languages may have been brought to India by migrations from the Iranian plateau in the fourth or third millennium BCE or even earlier, reconstructed proto-Dravidian vocabulary suggests that the family is indigenous to India.

Genetically, the ancient Indus Valley people were composed of a primarily Iranian hunter-gatherers (or farmers) ancestry, with varying degrees of ancestry from local hunter-gatherer groups. The modern-day Dravidian-speakers display a similar genetic makeup, but also carry a small portion of Western Steppe Herder ancestry and may also have additional contributions from local hunter-gatherer groups.

Although in modern times speakers of various Dravidian languages have mainly occupied the southern portion of India, Dravidian speakers must have been widespread throughout the Indian subcontinent before the Indo-Aryan migration into the subcontinent. According to Horen Tudu, "many academic researchers have attempted to connect the Dravidians with the remnants of the great Indus Valley civilisation, located in Northwestern India... but [i]t is mere speculation that the Dravidians are the ensuing post–Indus Valley settlement of refugees into South and Central India." The most noteworthy scholar making such claims is Asko Parpola, who did extensive research on the IVC-scripts. The Brahui population of Balochistan in Pakistan has been taken by some as the linguistic equivalent of a relict population, perhaps indicating that Dravidian languages were formerly much more widespread and were supplanted by the incoming Indo-Aryan languages.

Asko Parpola, who regards the Harappans to have been Dravidian, notes that Mehrgarh (7000–2500 BCE), to the west of the Indus River valley, is a precursor of the Indus Valley Civilisation, whose inhabitants migrated into the Indus Valley and became the Indus Valley Civilisation. It is one of the earliest sites with evidence of farming and herding in South Asia. According to Lukacs and Hemphill, while there is a strong continuity between the Neolithic and Chalcolithic (Copper Age) cultures of Mehrgarh, dental evidence shows that the Chalcolithic population did not descend from the Neolithic population of Mehrgarh, which "suggests moderate levels of gene flow". They further noted that "the direct lineal descendants of the Neolithic inhabitants of Mehrgarh are to be found to the south and the east of Mehrgarh, in northwestern India and the western edge of the Deccan plateau", with Neolithic Mehrgarh showing greater affinity with chalocolithic Inamgaon, south of Mehrgarh, than with Chalcolithic Mehrgarh.

==== Indus Valley Civilisation ====
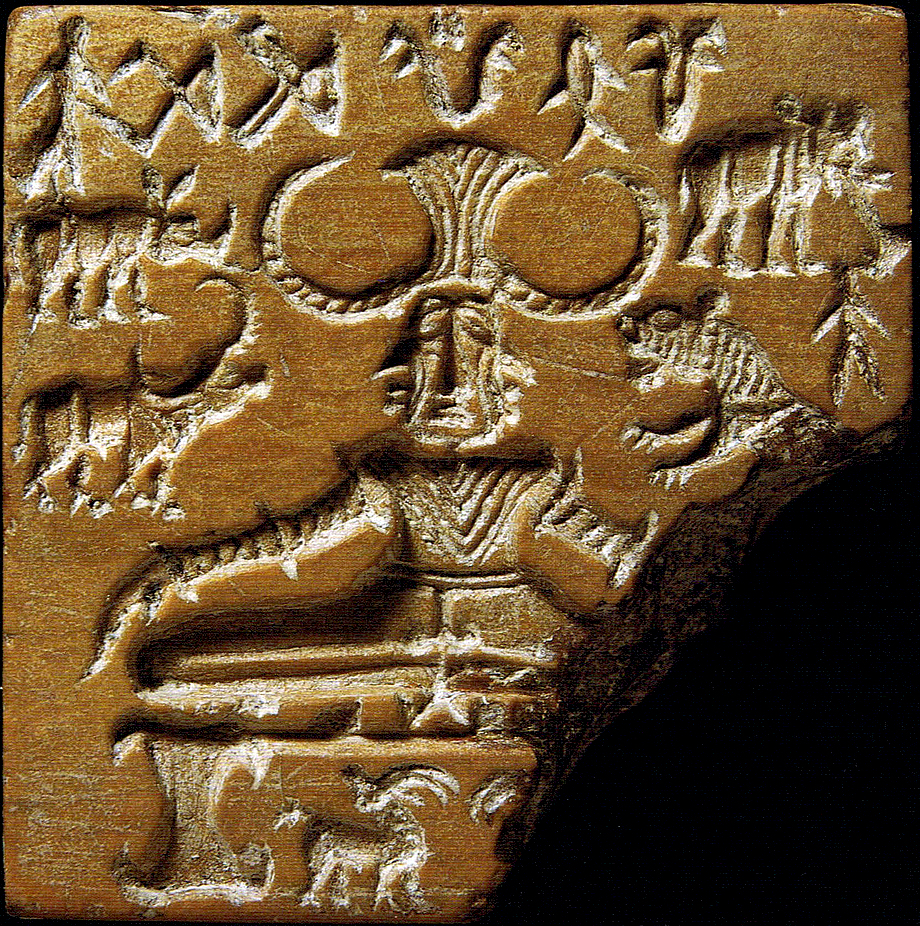
The Pashupati seal from the Indus Valley Civilisation

===== Dravidian identification =====
The Indus Valley Civilisation (2,600–1,900 BCE) located in the northwest of the Indian subcontinent is sometimes identified as having been Dravidian. Already in 1924, when announcing the discovery of the IVC, John Marshall stated that (one of) the language(s) may have been Dravidic. Cultural and linguistic similarities have been cited by researchers Henry Heras, Kamil Zvelebil, Asko Parpola and Iravatham Mahadevan as being strong evidence for a proto-Dravidian origin of the ancient Indus Valley civilisation. The discovery in Tamil Nadu of a late Neolithic (early 2nd millennium BCE, i.e. post-dating Harappan decline) stone celt allegedly marked with Indus signs has been considered by some to be significant for the Dravidian identification.

Yuri Knorozov surmised that the symbols represent a logosyllabic script and suggested, based on computer analysis, an agglutinative Dravidian language as the most likely candidate for the underlying language. Knorozov's suggestion was preceded by the work of Henry Heras, who suggested several readings of signs based on a proto-Dravidian assumption.

Linguist Asko Parpola writes that the Indus script and Harappan language are "most likely to have belonged to the Dravidian family". Parpola led a Finnish team in investigating the inscriptions using computer analysis. Based on a proto-Dravidian assumption, they proposed readings of many signs, some agreeing with the suggested readings of Heras and Knorozov (such as equating the "fish" sign with the Dravidian word for fish, "min") but disagreeing on several other readings. A comprehensive description of Parpola's work until 1994 is given in his book Deciphering the Indus Script.

===== Decline, migration and Dravidianisation =====
Paleoclimatologists believe the fall of the Indus Valley Civilisation and eastward migration during the late Harappan period was due to climate change in the region, with a 200-year long drought being the major factor. The Indus Valley Civilisation seemed to slowly lose their urban cohesion, and their cities were gradually abandoned during the late Harappan period, followed by eastward migrations before the Indo-Aryan migration into the Indian subcontinent.

The process of post-Harappan/Dravidian influences on southern India has tentatively been called "Dravidianization", and is reflected in the post-Harappan mixture of IVC and Ancient Ancestral South Indian people. Yet, according to Krishnamurti, Dravidian languages may have reached south India before Indo-Aryan migrations.

==== Dravidian and Indo-Aryan interactions ====
===== Dravidian substrate =====
The Dravidian language influenced the Indo-Aryan languages. Dravidian languages show extensive lexical (vocabulary) borrowing, but only a few traits of structural (either phonological or grammatical) borrowing from Indo-Aryan, whereas Indo-Aryan shows more structural than lexical borrowings from the Dravidian languages. Many of these features are already present in the oldest known Indo-Aryan language, the language of the Rigveda (c. 1500 BCE), which also includes over a dozen words borrowed from Dravidian. The linguistic evidence for Dravidian impact grows stronger as we move from the Samhitas down through the later Vedic works and into the classical post-Vedic literature. This represents an early religious and cultural fusion (Note: Lockard: "The encounters that resulted from Aryan migration brought together several very different peoples and cultures, reconfiguring Indian society. Over many centuries a fusion of Aryan and Dravidian occurred, a complex process that historians have labeled the Indo-Aryan synthesis." Lockard: "Hinduism can be seen historically as a synthesis of Aryan beliefs with Harappan and other Dravidian traditions that developed over many centuries.") or synthesis between ancient Dravidians and Indo-Aryans.

According to Mallory there are an estimated thirty to forty Dravidian loanwords in Rig Veda. Some of those for which Dravidian etymologies are certain include ಕುಲಾಯ kulāya "nest", ಕುಲ್ಫ kulpha "ankle", ದಂಡ daṇḍa "stick", ಕುಲ kūla "slope", ಬಿಲ bila "hollow", ಖಲ khala "threshing floor". While J. Bloch and M. Witzel believe that the Indo-Aryans moved into an already Dravidian-speaking area after the oldest parts of the Rig Veda were already composed.

According to Thomason and Kaufman, there is strong evidence that Dravidian influenced Indic through "shift", that is, native Dravidian speakers learning and adopting Indic languages. According to Erdosy, the most plausible explanation for the presence of Dravidian structural features in Old Indo-Aryan is that the majority of early Old Indo-Aryan speakers had a Dravidian mother tongue which they gradually abandoned. Erdosy (1995:18) Even though the innovative traits in Indic could be explained by multiple internal explanations, early Dravidian influence is the only explanation that can account for all of the innovations at once. Early Dravidian influence accounts for several of the innovative traits in Indic better than any internal explanation that has been proposed. According to Zvelebil, "several scholars have demonstrated that pre-Indo-Aryan and pre-Dravidian bilingualism in India provided conditions for the far-reaching influence of Dravidian on the Indo-Aryan tongues in the spheres of phonology, syntax and vocabulary."

===== Sanskritisation =====
With the rise of the Kuru kingdom a process of Sanskritization started which influenced all of India, with the populations of the north of the Indian subcontinent predominantly speaking the Indo-Aryan languages.

=== Dravidian kingdoms and empires ===
The third century BCE onwards saw the development of large Dravidian empires like Chola, Pandya, Rashtrakuta, Vijayanagara, Chalukyas Western Chalukya, and kingdoms like Chera, Chutu, Ay, Alupa, Pallava, Hoysala, Western Ganga, Eastern Ganga, Kadamba, Kalabhra, Andhra Ikshvaku, Vishnukundina, Eastern Chalukya, Sena, Kakatiya, Reddy, Mysore, Jaffna, Mysore, Travancore, Venad, Cochin, Cannanore, Calicut and the Nayakas.

=== Medieval trade and influence ===
Medieval Tamil guilds and trading organisations like the Ayyavole and Manigramam played an important role in the southeast Asia trade. Traders and religious leaders travelled to southeast Asia and played an important role in the cultural Indianisation of the region. Locally developed scripts such as Grantha and Pallava script induced the development of many native scripts such as Khmer, Javanese Kawi, Baybayin, and Thai.

Around this time, Dravidians encountered Muslim traders, and the first Tamil Muslims and Sri Lankan Moors appeared.

=== European contact (1500 onward) ===
Portuguese explorers like Vasco de Gama were motivated to expand mainly for the spice markets of Calicut (today called Kozhikode) in modern-day Kerala. This led to the establishment of a series of Portuguese colonies along the western coasts of Karnataka and Kerala, including Mangalore. During this time Portuguese Jesuit priests also arrived and converted a small number of people in modern Kerala, Karnataka and Tamil Nadu to Catholicism, most notably the Paravars.

== Dravidian culture ==
=== Religious belief ===
Ancient Dravidian religion constituted of an animistic and non-Vedic form of religion which may have influenced the Āgamas, Vedic and non-Vedic texts which post-date the Vedic texts. The Agamas are Tamil and Sanskrit scriptures chiefly constituting the methods of temple construction and creation of murti, worship means of deities, philosophical doctrines, meditative practices, attainment of sixfold desires and four kinds of yoga. The worship of village deities, as well as sacred flora and fauna in Hinduism is recognised as a survival of the pre-Vedic Dravidian religion. Hinduism can be regarded as a religious and cultural fusion or synthesis between ancient Dravidians and Indo-Aryans, and other local elements.

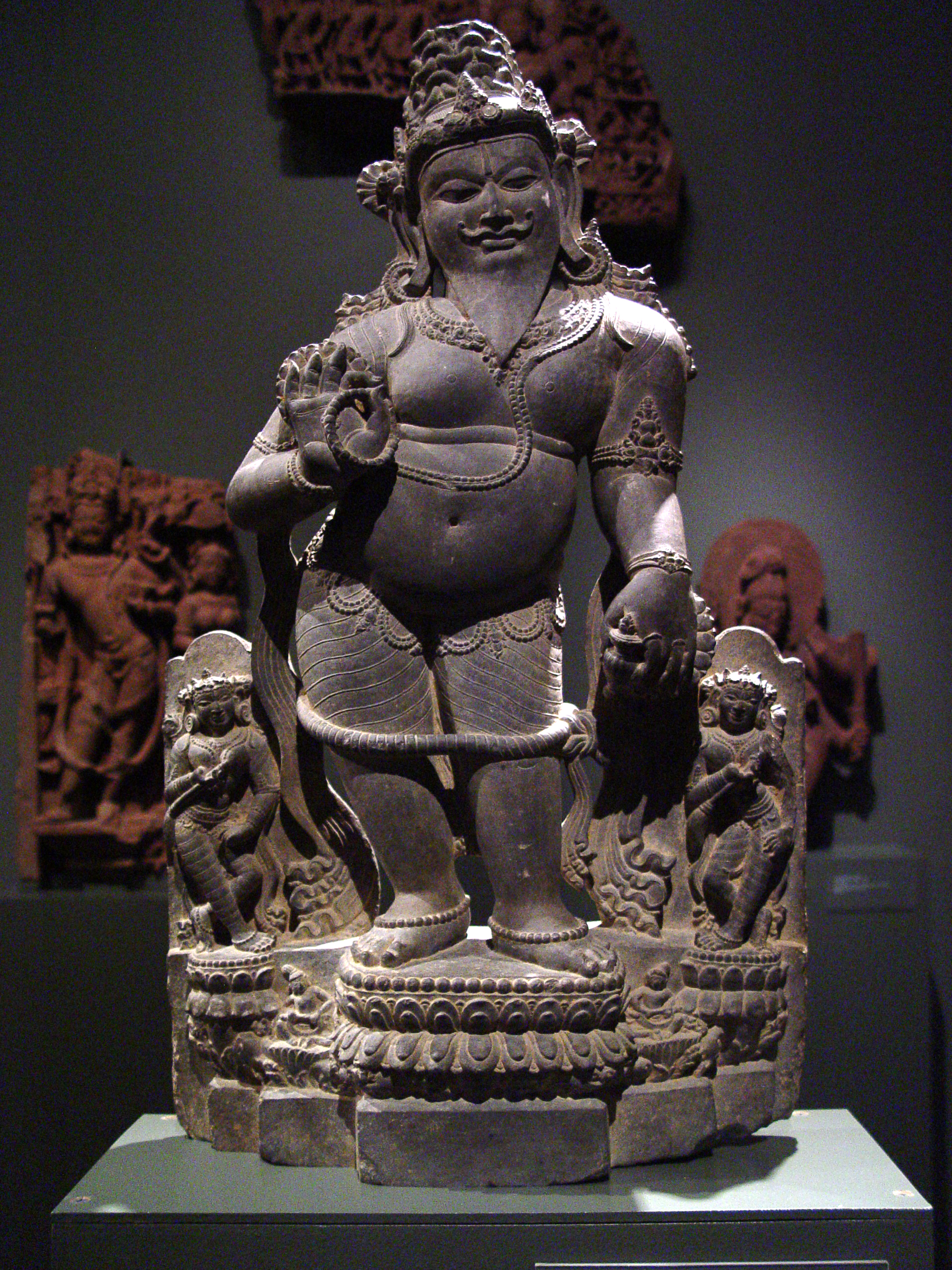
Sage Agastya, father of Tamil literature

Ancient Tamil grammatical works Tolkappiyam, the ten anthologies Pattuppāṭṭu, and the eight anthologies Eṭṭuttokai shed light on early ancient Dravidian religion. Murugan (also known as Seyyon) was glorified as the red god seated on the blue peacock, who is ever young and resplendent, as the favoured god of the Tamils. Sivan was also seen as the supreme God. Early iconography of Murugan and Sivan and their association with native flora and fauna goes back to the Indus Valley Civilisation. The Sangam landscape was classified into five categories, thinais, based on the mood, the season and the land. Tolkappiyam mentions that each of these thinai had an associated deity such as Seyyon in Kurinji (hills), Thirumaal in Mullai (forests), and Kotravai in Marutham (plains), and Wanji-ko in the Neithal (coasts and seas). Other gods mentioned were Mayyon and Vaali, now identified with Krishna and Balarama, who are all major deities in Hinduism today. This represents an early religious and cultural fusion or synthesis between ancient Dravidians and Indo-Aryans, which became more evident over time with sacred iconography, traditions, philosophy, flora and fauna that went on to influence and shape Indian civilisation.

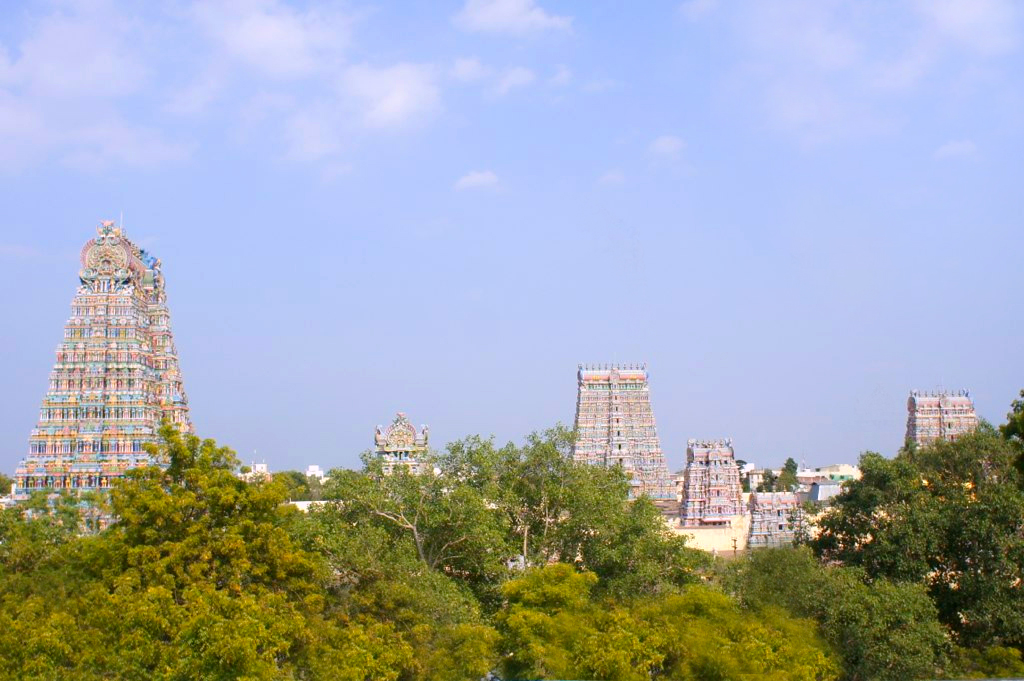
Meenakshi Amman temple, dedicated to Goddess Meenakshi, tutelary deity of Madurai city

Throughout Tamilakam, a king was considered to be divine by nature and possessed religious significance. The king was 'the representative of God on earth' and lived in a "koyil", which means the "residence of a god". The Modern Tamil word for temple is koil (Tamil: கோயில்). Ritual worship was also given to kings. Modern words for god like "kō" (Tamil: கோ "king"), "iṟai" (இறை "emperor") and "āṇḍavar" (ஆண்டவன் "conqueror") now primarily refer to gods. These elements were incorporated later into Hinduism like the legendary marriage of Shiva to Queen Mīnātchi who ruled Madurai or Wanji-ko, a god who later merged into Indra. Tolkappiyar refers to the Three Crowned Kings as the "Three Glorified by Heaven", (Tamil: வாண்புகழ் மூவர், Vāṉpukaḻ Mūvar). In Dravidian-speaking South India, the concept of divine kingship led to the assumption of major roles by state and temple.

The cult of the mother goddess is treated as an indication of a society which venerated femininity. This mother goddess was conceived as a virgin, one who has given birth to all and one, and were typically associated with Shaktism. The temples of the Sangam days, mainly of Madurai, seem to have had priestesses to the deity, which also appears predominantly as a goddess. In the Sangam literature, there is an elaborate description of the rites performed by the Kurava priestess in the shrine Palamutircholai.

Among the early Dravidians, the practice of erecting memorial stones, Natukal and Viragal, had appeared, and it continued for quite a long time after the Sangam age, down to about the 16th century. It was customary for people who sought victory in war to worship these hero stones to bless them with victory.

=== Architecture and visual art ===
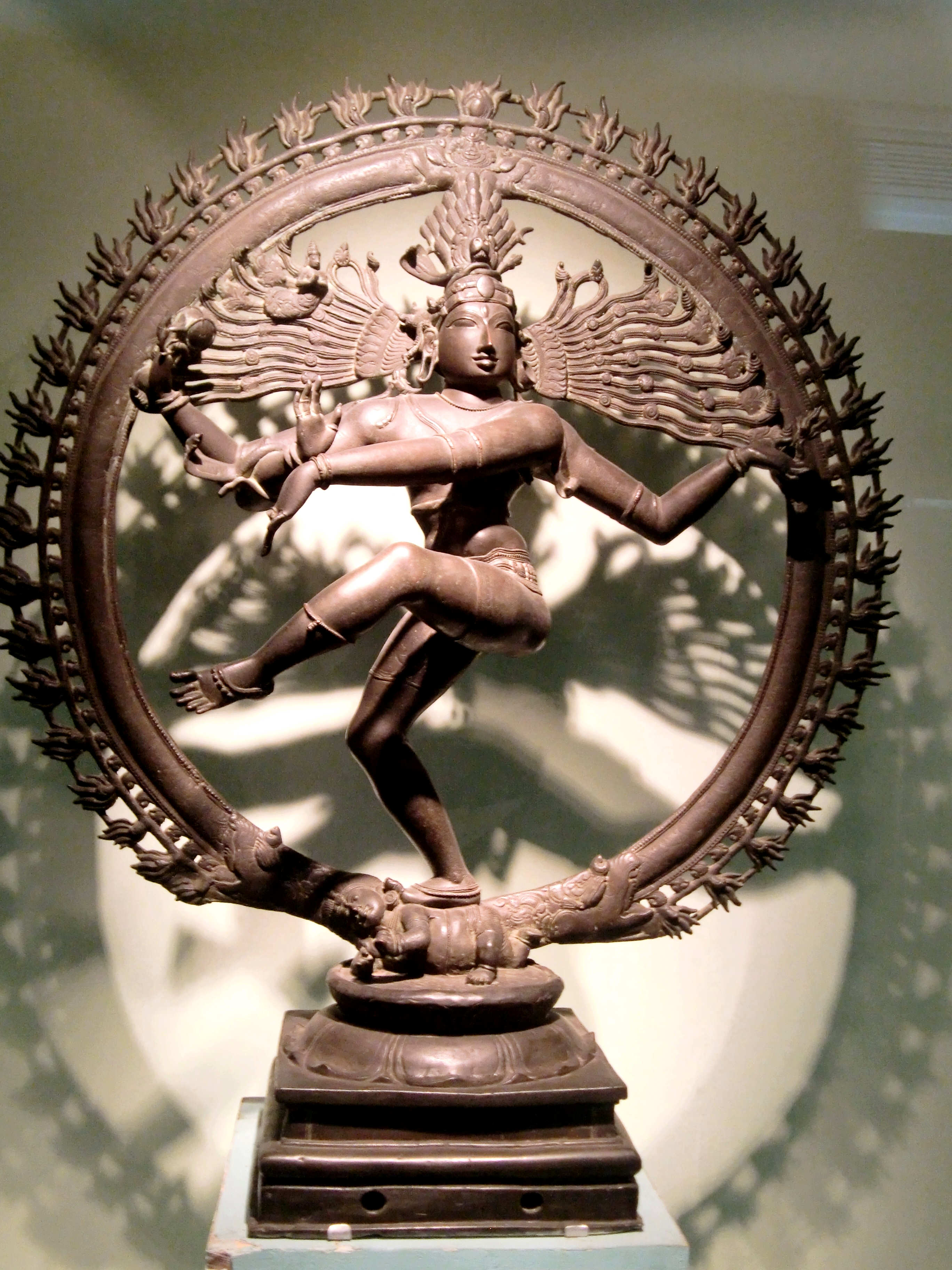
Nataraja, example of Chola Empire bronze has become notable as a symbol of Hinduism.

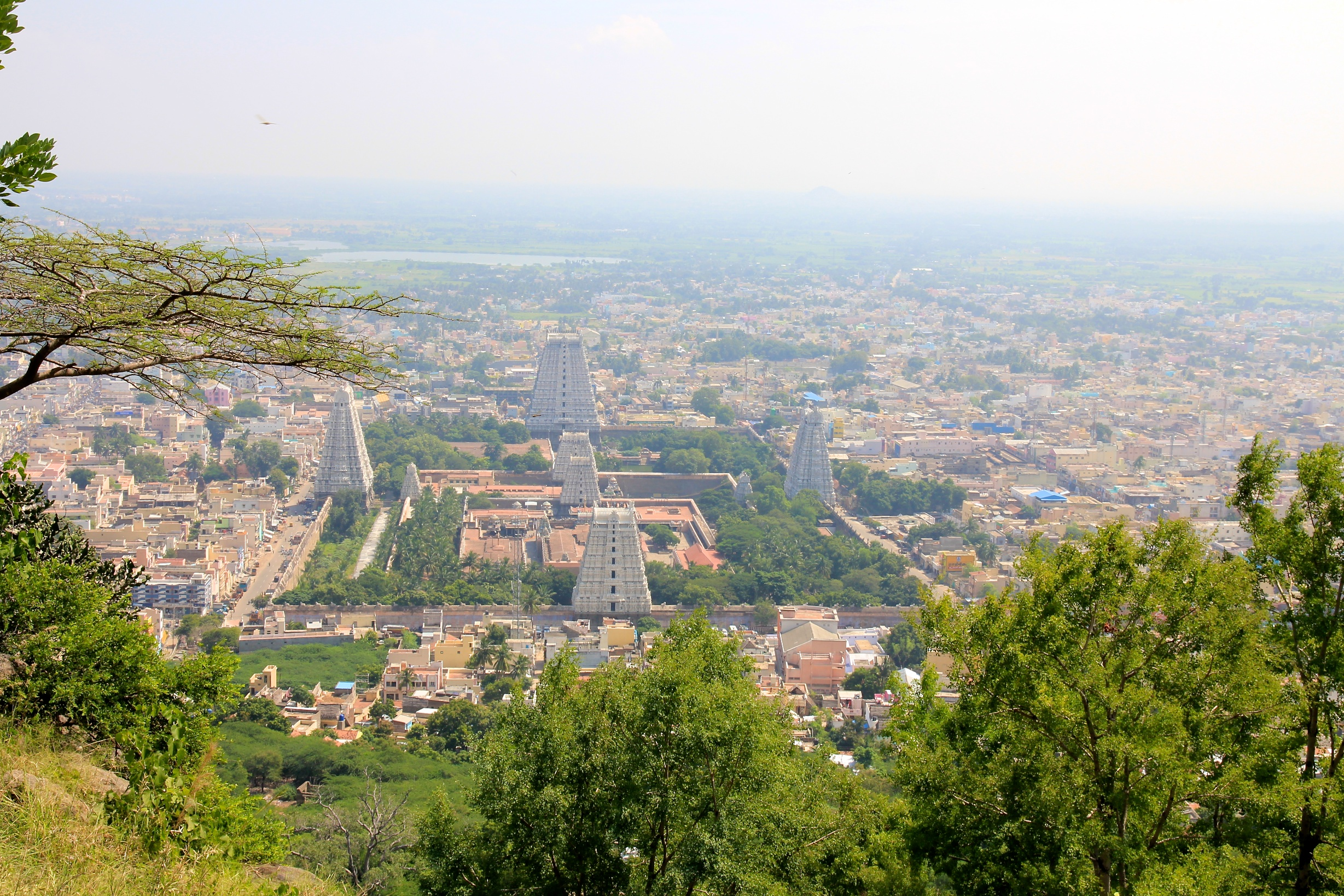
Typical layout of Dravidian temple architecture, 9th century A.D

Mayamata and Manasara shilpa texts estimated to be in circulation by the 5th to 7th century AD, are guidebooks on the Dravidian style of Vastu Shastra design, construction, sculpture and joinery technique. Isanasivagurudeva paddhati is another text from the 9th century describing the art of building in India in south and central India. In north India, Brihat-samhita by Varāhamihira is the widely cited ancient Sanskrit manual from the 6th century describing the design and construction of Nagara-style Hindu temples. Traditional Dravidian architecture and symbolism are also based on Agamas. The Agamas are non-Vedic in origin and have been dated either as post-Vedic texts or as pre-Vedic compositions. The Agamas are a collection of Tamil and Sanskrit scriptures chiefly constituting the methods of temple construction and creation of murti, worship means of deities, philosophical doctrines, meditative practices, attainment of sixfold desires and four kinds of yoga.

Chola-style temples consist almost invariably of the three following parts, arranged in differing manners, but differing in themselves only according to the age in which they were executed:

1. The porches or Mantapas, which always cover and precede the door leading to the cell.
2. Gate-pyramids, Gopuras, which are the principal features in the quadrangular enclosures that surround the more notable temples. Gopuras are very common in Dravidian temples.
3. Pillared halls (Chaultris or Chawadis) are used for many purposes and are the invariable accompaniments of these temples.

Besides these, a south Indian temple usually has a tank called the Kalyani or Pushkarni – to be used for sacred purposes or the convenience of the priests – dwellings for all the grades of the priesthood are attached to it, and other buildings for state or convenience.

=== Theatre, dance and music ===
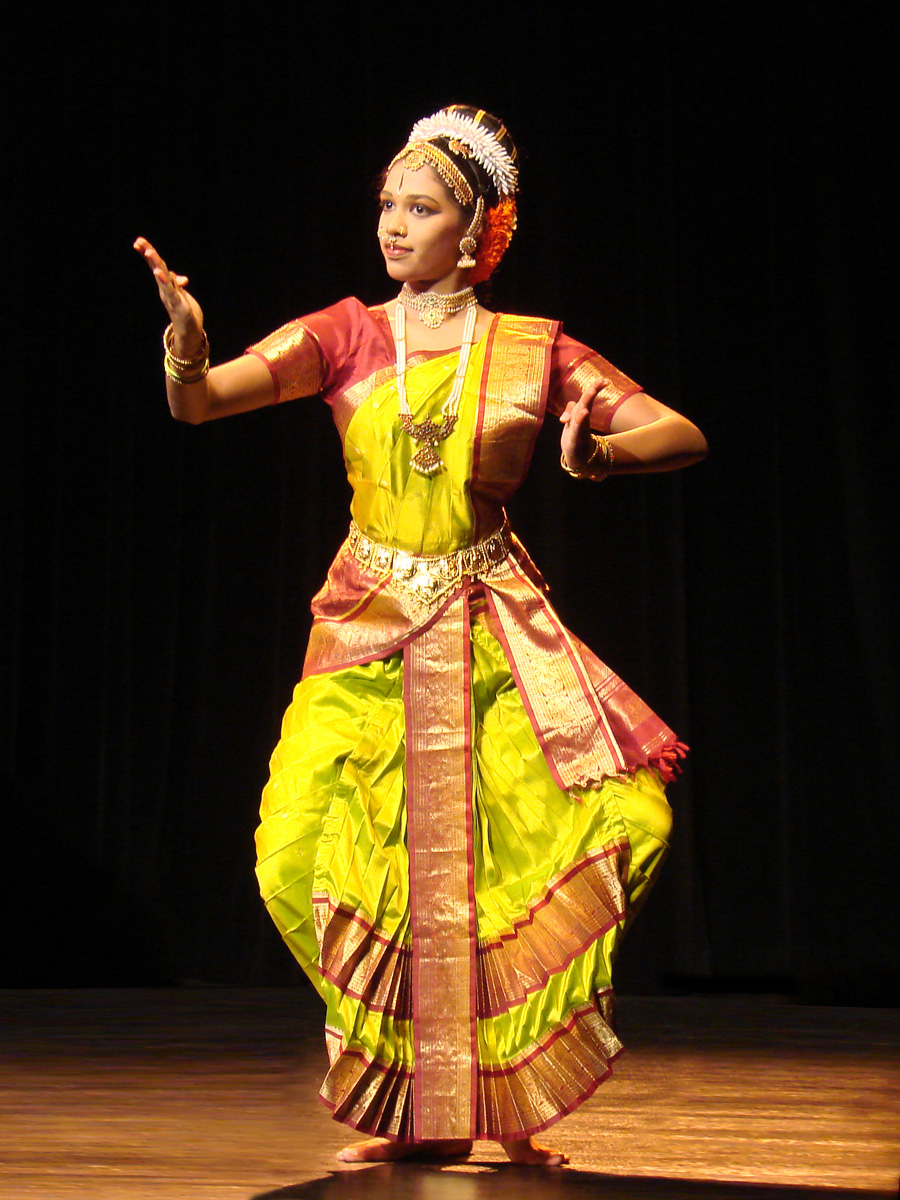
A Kuchipudi dancer.

Literary evidence of traditional form of theatre, dance and music dates back to the 3rd century BCE. Ancient literary works, such as the Cilappatikaram, describe a system of music. The theatrical culture flourished during the early Sangam age. Theatre-dance traditions have a long and varied history whose origins can be traced back almost two millennia to dance-theatre forms like Kotukotti, Kaapaalam and Pandarangam, which are mentioned in an ancient anthology of poems entitled the Kaliththokai. Dance forms such as Bharatanatyam are based on older temple dance forms known as Catir Kacceri, as practised by courtesans and a class of women known as Devadasis.

Carnatic music originated in the Dravidian region. With the growing influence of Persian and Sufi music on Indian music, a clear distinction in style appeared from the 12th century onwards. Many literary works were composed in Carnatic style and it soon spread wide in the Dravidian regions. The most notable Carnatic musician is Purandara Dasa who lived in the court of Krishnadevaraya of the Vijayanagara empire. He formulated the basic structure of Carnatic music and is regarded as the Pitamaha (lit, "father" or the "grandfather") of Carnatic Music. Kanakadasa is another notable Carnatic musician who was Purandaradasa's contemporary.

Each of the major Dravidian languages has its own film industry like Kollywood (Tamil), Tollywood (Telugu), Sandalwood (Kannada), Mollywood (Malayalam). Kollywood and Tollywood produce most films in India.

=== Clothing ===
Dravidian speakers in southern India wear varied traditional costumes depending on their region, largely influenced by local customs and traditions. The most traditional dress for Dravidian men is the lungi, or the more formal dhoti, called veshti in Tamil, panche in Kannada and Telugu, and mundu in Malayalam. The lungi consists of a colourful checked cotton cloth. Many times these lungis are tube-shaped and tied around the waist, and can be easily tied above the knees for more strenuous activities. The lungi is usually everyday dress, used for doing labour while dhoti is used for more formal occasions. Many villagers have only a lungi as their article of clothing. The dhoti is generally white in colour, and occasionally has a border of red, green or gold. Dhotis are usually made out of cotton for more everyday use, but the more expensive silk dhotis are used for special functions like festivals and weddings.

Traditional dress of Dravidian women is typical of most Indian women, that of the sari. This sari consists of a cloth wrapped around the waist and draped over the shoulder. Originally saris were worn bare, but during the Victorian era, women began wearing blouse (called a ravike) along with sari. In fact, until the late 19th century most Kerala women did not wear any upper garments, or were forced to by law, and in many villages, especially in tribal communities, the sari is worn without the blouse. Unlike Indo-Aryan speakers, most Dravidian women do not cover their head with the pallu except in areas of North Karnataka. Due to the complexity of draping the sari, younger girls start with a skirt called a pavada. When they get older, around the age when puberty begins, they transition to a langa voni or half-sari, which is composed of a skirt tied at the waist along with a cloth draped over a blouse. After adulthood girls begin using the sari. There are many different styles of sari draping varying across regions and communities. Examples are the Madisar, specific to Tamil Brahmin Community, and the Mundum Neriyathum.

=== Martial arts and sports ===
In Mahabharata, Bhishma claimed that southerners are skilled with sword-fighting in general and Sahadeva was chosen for the conquest of the southern kingdoms due to his swordsmanship. In South India various types of martial arts are practised like Kalaripayattu and Silambam.

In ancient times there were ankams, public duels to the death, to solve disputes between opposing rulers. Among some communities, young girls received preliminary training up until the onset of puberty. In vadakkan pattukal ballads, at least a few women warriors continued to practice and achieved a high degree of expertise.

Sports like kambala, jallikattu, kabaddi, vallam kali, lambs and tigers, and maramadi remain strong among Dravidian ethnic groups.

== See also ==
General

- Dravidian languages
- Dravidian University (dedicated to research and learning of Dravidian languages)

Culture

- Dance forms of Andhra Pradesh
- Culture of Telangana
- Arts of Kerala
- Dance forms of Tamil Nadu
- Folk arts of Karnataka

Other

- Proto-Indo-Europeans
- Early Indians
- Indo-Aryan peoples
- Indian diaspora

== Sources ==
- Andronov, Mikhail Sergeevich (2003). A Comparative Grammar of the Dravidian Languages. Otto Harrassowitz. ISBN 978-3-447-04455-4.
- Basham, A.L. (1967). The Wonder That was India (3rd ed.). London: Sidgwick & Jackson. OCLC 459272.
- Basu, Analabha; Sarkar-Roya, Neeta; Majumder, Partha P. (9 February 2016), "Genomic reconstruction of the history of extant populations of India reveals five distinct ancestral components and a complex structure", PNAS, 113 (6): 1594–9, Bibcode:2016PNAS..113.1594B, doi:10.1073/pnas.1513197113, PMC 4760789, PMID 26811443
- Cavalli-Sforza, Luigi Luca; Menozzi, Paolo; Piazza, Alberto (1994), The History and Geography of Human Genes, Princeton University Press
- Coningham, Robin; Young, Ruth (2015), The Archaeology of South Asia: From the Indus to Asoka, c.6500 BCE–200 CE, Cambridge University Press
- Derenko, Miroslava (2013), "Complete Mitochondrial DNA Diversity in Iranians", PLOS ONE, 8 (11) e80673, Bibcode:2013PLoSO...880673D, doi:10.1371/journal.pone.0080673, PMC 3828245, PMID 24244704
- Gallego Romero, Irene; et al. (2011), "Herders of Indian and European Cattle Share their Predominant Allele for Lactase Persistence", Molecular Biology and Evolution, 29 (1): 249–60, doi:10.1093/molbev/msr190, PMID 21836184
- Hiltebeitel, Alf (2007) [First published 1987]. "Hinduism". In Kitagawa, Joseph M. (ed.). The Religious Traditions of Asia: Religion, History, and Culture. Routledge. ISBN 978-0-7007-1762-0.
- Heras, Henry (1953). Studies in Proto-Indo-Mediterranean Culture. Bombay: Indian Historical Research Institute. OCLC 2799353.
- Kivisild; et al. (1999), "Deep common ancestry of Indian and western-Eurasian mitochondrial DNA lineages", Current Biology, 9 (22): 1331–1334, Bibcode:1999CBio....9.1331K, doi:10.1016/s0960-9822(00)80057-3, PMID 10574762, S2CID 2821966
- Knorozov, Yuri V. (1965). "Характеристика протоиндийского языка" [Characteristics of Proto-Indian language]. Predvaritel'noe soobshchenie ob issledovanii protoindiyskikh textov Предварительное сообщение об исследовании протоиндийских текстов [A Preliminary Report on the Study of Proto Texts] (in Russian). Moscow: Institute of Ethnography of the USSR.
- Krishnamurti, Bhadriraju (2003). The Dravidian Languages. Cambridge Language Surveys. Cambridge: Cambridge University Press. ISBN 978-0-521-77111-5.
- Larson, Gerald (1995). India's Agony Over Religion. SUNY Press. ISBN 978-0-7914-2411-7.
- Lockard, Craig A. (2007). Societies, Networks, and Transitions. Vol. I. Cengage Learning. ISBN 978-0-618-38612-3.
- Mallory, J. P. (1989). In Search of the Indo-Europeans: Language, Archaeology and Myth. London: Thames and Hudson. ISBN 978-0-500-05052-1.
- Metspalu, Mait; Romero, Irene Gallego; Yunusbayev, Bayazit; Chaubey, Gyaneshwer; Mallick, Chandana Basu; Hudjashov, Georgi; Nelis, Mari; Mägi, Reedik; Metspalu, Ene; Remm, Maido; Pitchappan, Ramasamy; Singh, Lalji; Thangaraj, Kumarasamy; Villems, Richard; Kivisild, Toomas (2011), "Shared and Unique Components of Human Population Structure and Genome-Wide Signals of Positive Selection in South Asia", The American Journal of Human Genetics, 89 (6): 731–744, doi:10.1016/j.ajhg.2011.11.010, ISSN 0002-9297, PMC 3234374, PMID 22152676
- Moorjani, P.; Thangaraj, K.; Patterson, N.; Lipson, M.; Loh, P.R.; Govindaraj, P.; Singh, L. (2013), "Genetic evidence for recent population mixture in India", The American Journal of Human Genetics, 93 (3): 422–438, doi:10.1016/j.ajhg.2013.07.006, PMC 3769933, PMID 23932107
- Narasimhan, Vagheesh M.; Patterson, Nick; Moorjani, Priya; Lazaridis, Iosif; et al. (2019), "The formation of human populations in South and Central Asia", Science, 365 (6457) eaat7487, Bibcode:2019Sci...365t7487N, bioRxiv 10.1101/292581, doi:10.1126/science.aat7487, PMC 6822619
- Narasimhan, Vagheesh M.; Patterson, Nick; Moorjani, Priya; Rohland, Nadin; et al. (6 September 2019). "The Formation of Human Populations in South and Central Asia". Science. 365 (6457) eaat7487. Bibcode:2019Sci...365t7487N. doi:10.1126/science.aat7487. PMC 6822619. PMID 31488661.
- Palanichamy, Malliya Gounder (2015), "West Eurasian mtDNA lineages in India: an insight into the spread of the Dravidian language and the origins of the caste system", Human Genetics, 134 (6): 637–647, doi:10.1007/s00439-015-1547-4, PMID 25832481, S2CID 14202246
- Parpola, Asko (1994). Deciphering the Indus script. New York: Cambridge University Press. ISBN 978-0-521-43079-1.
- Parpola, Asko (2015), The Roots of Hinduism. The Early Arians and the Indus Civilization, Oxford University Press
- Reich, David; Thangaraj, Kumarasamy; Patterson, Nick; Price, Alkes L.; Singh, Lalji (2009), "Reconstructing Indian population history", Nature, 461 (7263): 489–494, Bibcode:2009Natur.461..489R, doi:10.1038/nature08365, ISSN 0028-0836, PMC 2842210, PMID 19779445
- Samuel, Geoffrey (2008). The Origins of Yoga and Tantra: Indic Religions to the Thirteenth Century. Cambridge University Press. ISBN 978-0-521-87351-2.
- Tiwari, Shiv Kumar (2002). Tribal Roots Of Hinduism. Sarup & Sons. ISBN 978-81-7625-299-7.
- Tudu, Horen (2008), "Dravidians", in Carole Elizabeth Boyce Davies (ed.), Encyclopedia of the African Diaspora: Origins, Experiences, and Culture [3 volumes]: Origins, Experiences, and Culture, ABC-CLIO, p. 400, ISBN 978-1-85109-705-0
- Witzel, Michael (1995), "Early Sanskritization: Origin and Development of the Kuru state" (PDF), Electronic Journal of Vedic Studies, 1 (4): 1–26, archived from the original (PDF) on 11 June 2007
- Zimmer, Heinrich (1951). Philosophies of India. Pantheon Books. ISBN 0-691-01758-1.
- Zvelebil, Kamil (1990). Dravidian Linguistics: An Introduction. Pondicherry: Pondicherry Institute of Linguistics and Culture. ISBN 978-81-85452-01-2.
- Erdosy, George (1995). The Indo-Aryans of Ancient South Asia: Language, Material Culture and Ethnicity. Berlin: de Gruyter. ISBN 978-3-11-014447-5.
- Indian Genome Variation Consortium (2008). "Genetic landscape of the people of India: A canvas for disease gene exploration". Journal of Genetics. 87 (1): 3–20. doi:10.1007/s12041-008-0002-x. PMID 18560169. S2CID 21473349.
- Thomason, Sarah Grey; Kaufman, Terrence (1988). Language Contact, Creolization, and Genetic Linguistics. Berkeley: University of California Press. ISBN 978-0-520-05789-0.
