= Haqaiq-e-Hindi =

- Author: Syed Abdul Wahid Bilgrami
- Original title: حقائق ہندی
- Language: Persian
- Subject: Sufi interpretations in Dhrupad, Bishnupad, and others
- Genre: Sufism
- Published: 1566
- Publication date: Hindi (1957) by Saiyid Athar Abbas Rizvi
- Publication place: India

Haqaiq-e-Hindi is a treatise written in 1566 by Meer Syed Abdul Wahid Bilgrami (1509–1608). It was written in Persian with the use of Sufi interpretations used in Dhrupad, Bishnupad and others.

It was taken into Scholarly field by Saiyid Athar Abbas Rizvi, who published it in Hindi in 1957.

== Reviews ==
According to Muzaffar Alam, in this work ‘Abdul Wahid ‘sought to reconcile Vaisnav symbols as well as the terms and ideas used in Hindu devotional songs with orthodox Muslim beliefs’ within the ‘syncretistic religious milieu’ of Awadh qasbas.
