= The Wonder That Was India =

1954 book by Arthur Llewellyn Basham

- First edition
- Author: Arthur Llewellyn Basham
- Language: English
- Subject: History
- Published: 1954 by Sidgwick & Jackson
- Publication place: United Kingdom
- Pages: 572 (third edition, 1977)
- ISBN: 0-330-43909-X

The Wonder That Was India: A Survey of the Culture of the Indian Sub-Continent Before the Coming of the Muslims, is a book on Indian history written by Arthur Llewellyn Basham and first published in 1954. It is a thematic survey of the civilization in the Indian subcontinent from ancient to the establishment of Muslim rule around 1200 CE. The book was written for an "ordinary Western reader who has little knowledge of the subject, but some interest in it". In the book, Basham has attempted to correct the negative stereotypes of India created by authors like James Mill, Thomas Babington Macaulay and Vincent Arthur Smith.

== Contents ==
The book is organized thematically, rather than as a chronological history of India. The outline includes sections on prehistory, history, society, the state, everyday life, religion, the arts, and language and literature.

== Reception ==
Thomas Trautmann considers this book his primary influence which encouraged him to study India. The foreword of the 2005 edition by Picador was written by him. David Dean Shulman has said that the book fascinated him. Scholars have noted it to be one of the most useful collection of information on ancient and classical India that is remarkably well-balanced.

As the book was written in mid-20th century, it reflects the scholarship at time. Several interpretations of the book have been revised in later reprints or contested by later research. However, its broad, humane portrait of early Indian civilization has continued to be valued.

== Sequel ==
A companion volume covering the subsequent period on Indian history from the coming of the Muslims to the British Raj was written by Saiyid Athar Abbas Rizvi, and was published in 1987.

== See also ==
- The Greatness That Was Babylon
