= The Might That Was Assyria =

1984 Assyrian history book by H. W. F. Saggs

- Cover page for The Might That Was Assyria
- Author: H. W. F. Saggs
- Language: English
- Publication date: 1984
- ISBN: 0-283-98961-0

The Might That Was Assyria is a 1984 book by the Assyriologist H. W. F. Saggs, in which the author illustrates the Neo-Assyrian Empire. Saggs spent half of his life studying the ancient Assyrians, before he wrote the book.

== See also ==
- The Greatness That Was Babylon
- Assyriology
