= H. W. F. Saggs =

British assyriologist & academic (1920–2005)

- Born: 2 December 1920
- Died: 31 August 2005 (aged 84); Long Melford
- Resting place: Holy Trinity Churchyard, Long Melford
- Citizenship: British
- Education: School of Oriental and African Studies
- Known for: Nimrud Letters
- Scientific career
- Fields: Assyriology
- Workplaces: University College, Cardiff
- Doctoral advisor: Sidney Smith

Henry William Frederick Saggs (2 December 1920 – 31 August 2005) was an English classicist and orientalist.

== Early life and education ==
Saggs was born in East Anglia on 2 December 1920. He attended Clacton County High School, following which he went to King's College London where he studied theology, graduating in 1942.

Saggs fought in the Second World War with the Fleet Air Arm. He suffered a broken back following an air accident in 1944. His brother, Arthur Roy Saggs, a sergeant in the RAF, died on 4 January 1945 in South Africa on a training flight, aged 20.

In 1946, he married Joan Butterworth. They had four daughters: Susan, Rachel, Deborah and Caroline.

He began his Assyriological studies at the School of Oriental and African Studies, London, under Sidney Smith after the war. In 1952, he joined Max Mallowan's excavation at Nimrud under the aegis of the British School of Archaeology in Iraq.

Saggs was awarded his PhD degree in 1953 for his dissertation titled A study of city administration in Assyria and Babylonia in the period 705 to 539 B.C. He joined SOAS as a lecturer in Akkadian.

== Career ==
Saggs has been described as "one of the outstanding Assyriologists of his generation". His life's work, encouraged by Max Mallowan, was the publication of 243 letters found at the Nimrud archive of cuneiform tablets. These were released as a series of articles in the journal Iraq and the book The Nimrud Letters 1952 (Cuneiform Texts from Nimrud V).

In 1965, Saggs worked at Tell al-Rimah in northern Iraq, and published a business archive of tablets dating from Middle Assyrian.

In 1966, Saggs was invited to take the Chair of Semitic Languages in University College, Cardiff. He served as Professor there from 1966 to 1983. Here he established good relations with Iraq's universities, inviting and training a series of Iraqi Assyriologists who then became influential in their own country. He also expanded Cardiff's specialisations to Ugaritic and Aramaic studies.

Saggs taught at Baghdad University in 1956-57, and later at Mosul University. He published the Anzu tablet of Sherifkhan with his former student Amir Suleiman, who was head of the department of arts at Mosul.

== Later life ==
Following his retirement, Saggs remained active both academically and in his pursuit of Old Testament studies, becoming a lay reader at Roydon, near Harlow. He published works popularising Assyriology and the history of the ancient Near East.

Saggs died on 31 August 2005. Joan died on 28 October 2011. They are both buried at Holy Trinity, Long Melford.

== Honours ==
Saggs was a Fellow of the Society of Antiquaries and of the Royal Asiatic Society.

== Bibliography ==
- The Greatness That Was Babylon (1962)
- Everyday Life in Assyria and Babylonia (1965)
- The Might That Was Assyria (1984)
- Civilisation before Greece and Rome (1989)
- The Babylonians (1995)

Saggs also published 14 papers in Iraq, the journal of the British Institute for the Study of Iraq.

== Other links ==
- cwgc.org/search/casualty_details
