= Kambala =

Annual buffalo race in Karnataka, India

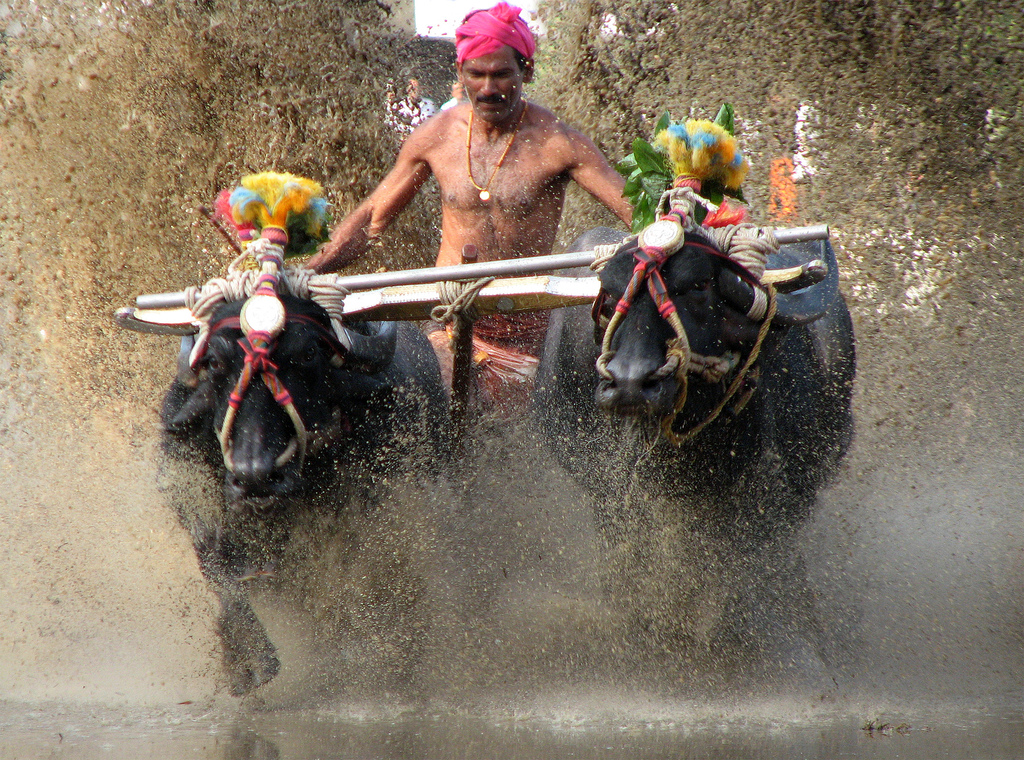
Famed Kambala Race of Kadri, Mangalore

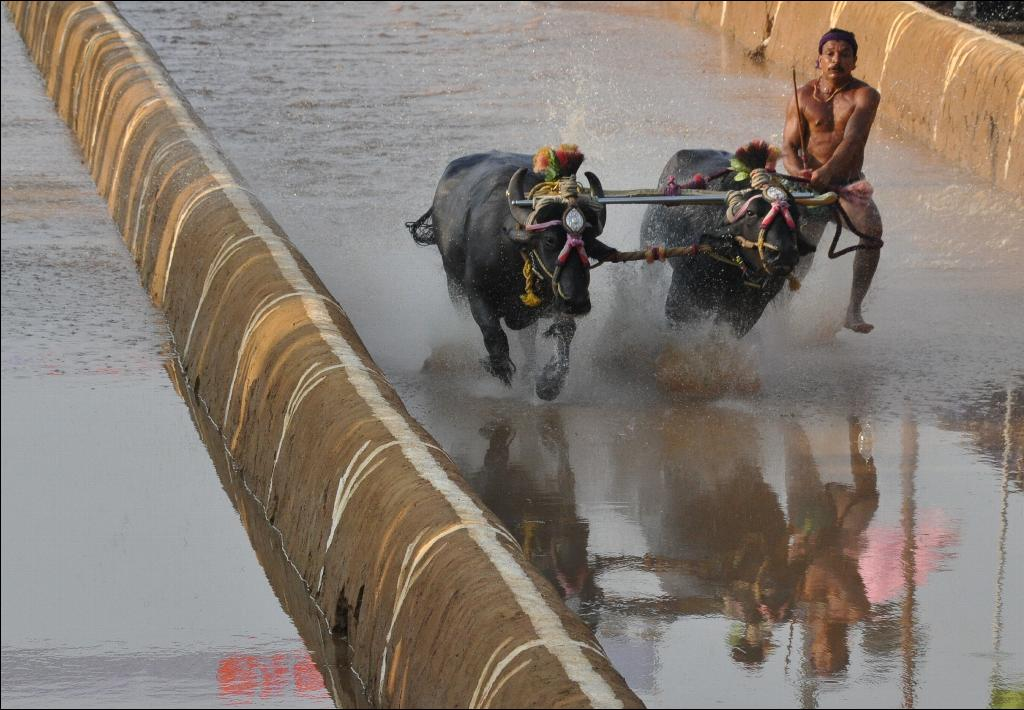
A Kambala Race at Pilikula Nisargadhama

Tulu Folk Song Kambla

The Kambala, Kambla or Kambula is an annual buffalo race held in the southwestern Indian state of Karnataka. It is similar to Maramadi of Kerala. Traditionally, it is sponsored by local Tuluva landlords and households in the coastal districts of Dakshina Kannada, Udupi and Bhatkal of Karnataka and Kasaragod of Kerala, a region collectively known as Tulu Nadu.

The Kambala season generally starts in November and lasts until March. The Kambalas are organised through Kambala samithis (Kambala associations). Over 45 races are held annually in coastal Karnataka.

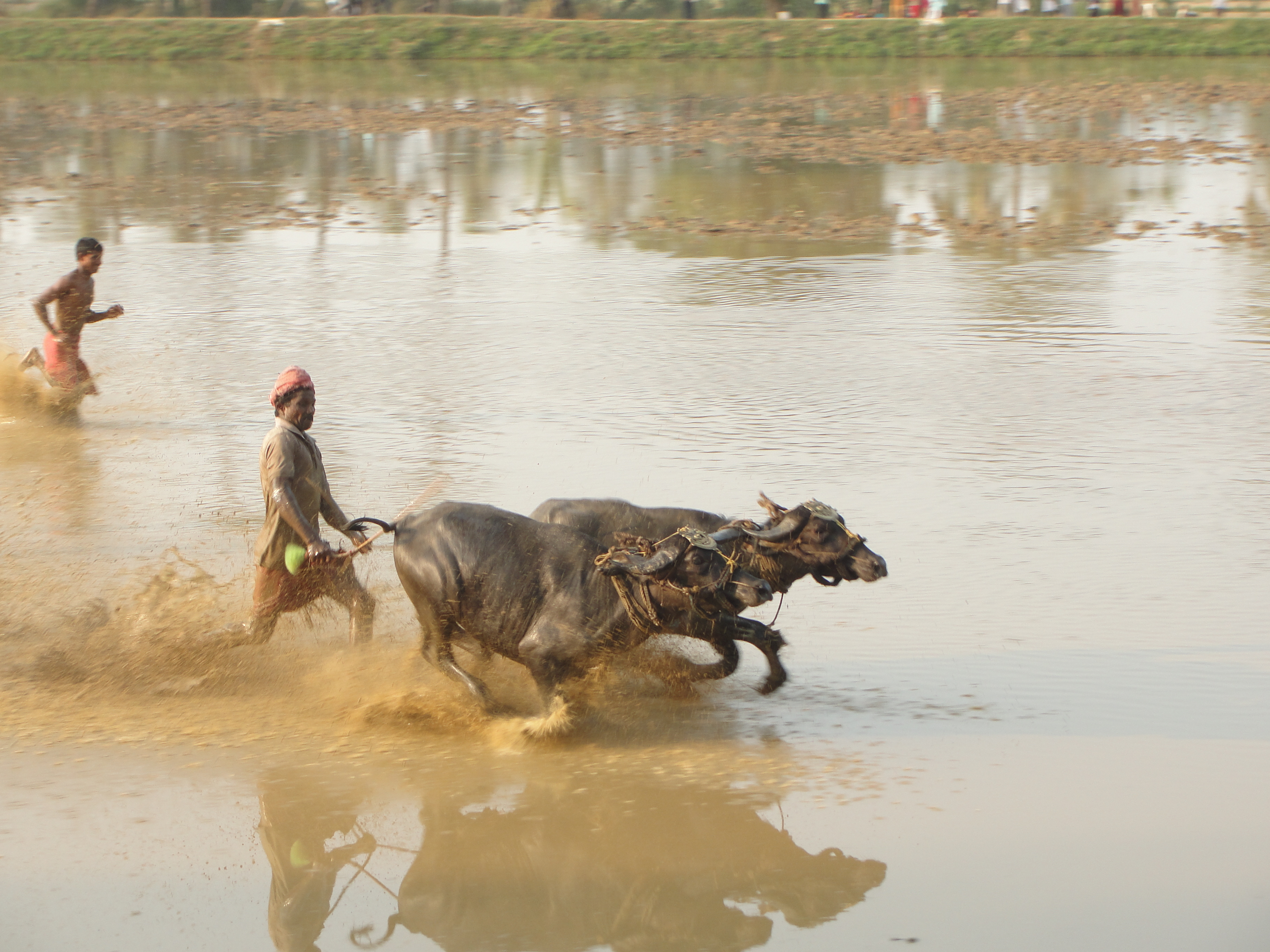
Kambala, race at Vandaru village, Udupi district, India

== Etymology ==
Kambala is derived from 'kampa-kala', where the word 'Kampa' relates to a slushy, muddy field. The Dravidian origin of the word Kampa is kan+pa and 'kala' means field, where it is conducted. Another interpretation of modern Kambala is derived from 'Kamba', a pole used for water spurt during race by buffalo pairs.

== Format ==
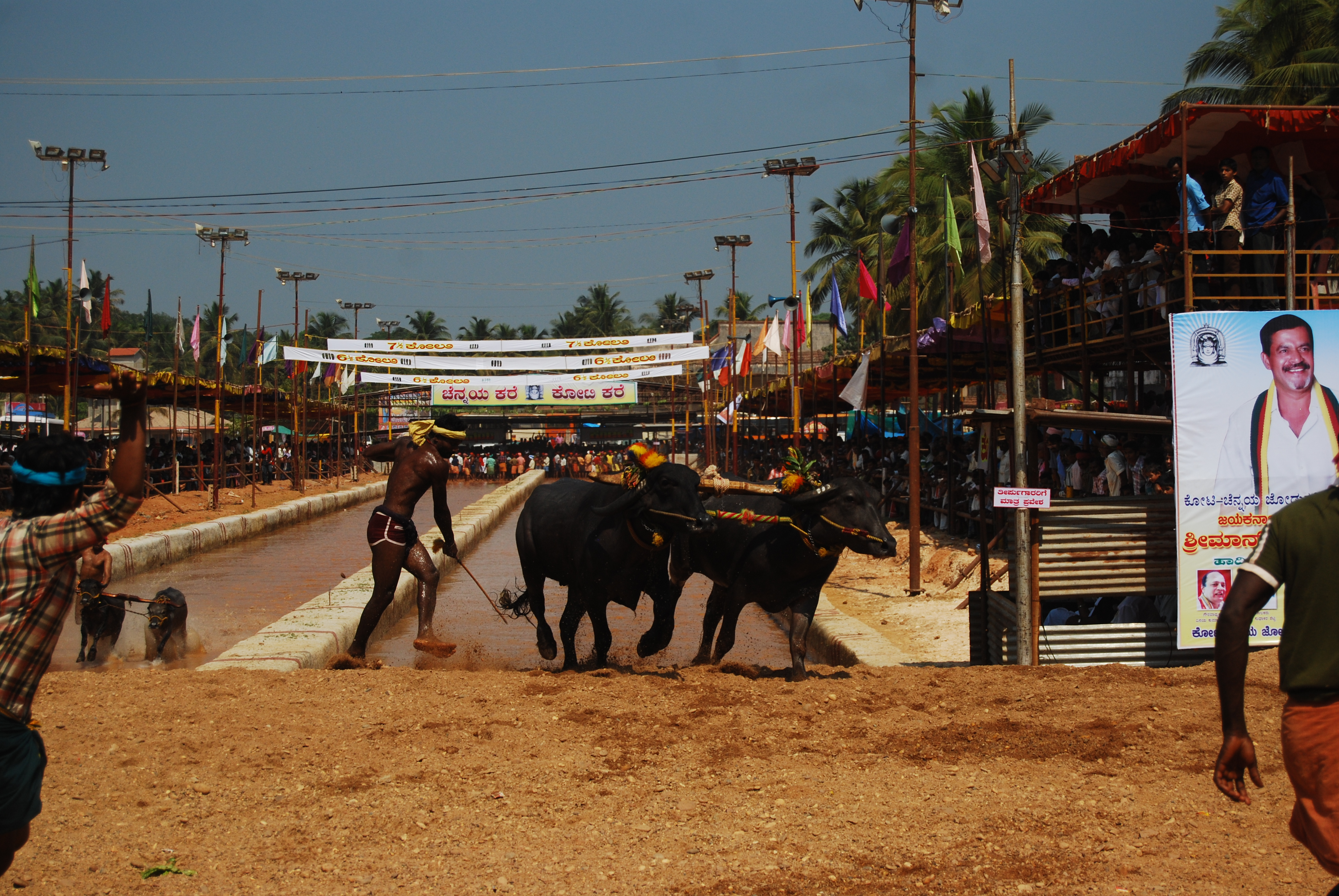
Puttur Koti - Chennayya Kambula

Kambala is a sport. The Kambala racetrack is a slushy paddy field, and the buffaloes are driven by a whip-lashing farmer.

Traditional Kambala was non-competitive, and the pair was run one by one. In modern Kambala, the contest generally takes place between two pairs of buffaloes. In villages such as Vandar (Vandaru) in Udupi and Chordi (Choradi) in Shivamogga, there is also a ritualistic aspect, as farmers race their buffaloes to give thanks to the deities for protecting them from diseases.

Historically, the winning pair of buffaloes was rewarded with coconuts and bananas. Today, owners of the winning beasts win gold and silver coins. Some organising committees award an eight-gram gold coin to the winner. In some competitions, cash prizes are awarded.

Buffalo race at Mulki, Tulu Nadu

=== Decoration of Buffalo ===
The buffaloes are decorated with coloured jhūls and head-pieces made of brass and silver (sometimes bearing the emblems of the sun and moon), and ropes which make a sort of bridle. The special towel used to cover the buffaloes' back is called the paavade (Tulu:ಪಾವಡೆ).

== Natha Pantha ==
The Kambla was influenced by Natha pantha, in earlier days. It starts the day before, with traditional dance of Koraga communities - mostly by men. They perform the entire night with the Panchamakara - madya (Alcohol), māṃsa (Meat), matsya (Fish), mudrā (Gesture), and maithuna (Sexual). The Koragas then perform a ceremony called panikkuluni, the meaning of word sitting under the dew. They sing songs to the accompaniment of their special kind of band dudi, about their special spirit daiva Nīcha, and offer toddy and a rice-pudding boiled in a large earthen pot, which is broken so that the pudding remains as a solid mass. This pudding is called kandēl addyē, or pot pudding.

== Innovations ==
Kambala has become an organised rural sport, with elaborate planning and scheduling to accommodate competitions at different places. A "Kambala Committee" arranges races in several categories describing the outfitting of the buffaloes. Typical categories are:

- Nāyer (ನಾಯೆರ್): The runner has to hold a special plough, it is not an actual plough which is tied to a pair of buffaloes. This type is mostly for the junior buffaloes or entry-level buffaloes. In the competition there are junior and senior rounds in this race.
- Bal (ಹಗ್ಗ: rope), A rope is directly tied to the buffalo pair. And this is for senior buffaloes as the speed is greater here and the participating buffaloes are well experienced. Runner running aside of buffalo holding knots in the rope. This has junior and senior levels.
- Aḍḍa palāyi (ಅಡ್ಡ ಪಲಾಯಿ: cross wooden block), A cross wooden plank is tied to the pair and the runner stands on it while racing. The wooden plank horizontally placed to muddy water, the runner stands on the plank. This is just for the senior category.
- Kaṇe palāyi (ಕಣೆ ಪಲಾಯಿ: round wooden block), a special made round wooden block where the runner stands on it on his single leg. There will special techniques with two holes in the block of wooden, which act like orifice, out of which the water forces out while running. The height of the water forcing out is measured to choose the winner. The more the speed is more the water height is. It would be 6 kolu or 7 Kolu there will a horizontal white cotton flag is installed so the general people judge the winner by eyewitness. Commonly it is called Nishaneg Neer Padune and this is only for senior most category.

Kambala has typically drawn large rural crowds throughout its three hundred year history. A well-organised Kambala can have more than 20,000 spectators in attendance. Spectators also bet on the buffalo.

In some places, night races are arranged under floodlights.

The buffaloes developed for the race are carefully fed and some owners have even built separate swimming pools for competing buffaloes.

== Thonnase Kambala ==
Thonnase Kambala used to be held in the month of December every year at Thonnase, Hebri taluk, Udupi district and it is called Dēvara Sampradayika Kambala as it is associated with Sri Dhoomavathi, Sri Gopalakrishna and Swami Parivara in the village.

== Kadri Kambala ==
Kadri Kambala used to be held at Kadri, Mangalore and it is called Dēvere Kambla (God's Kambala) as it is associated with Sri Manjunatha Temple in that city. This event was patronised by the Alupa kings of Mangalore, 300 years ago. For this reason, Kadri Kambala is also known as Arasu Kambala (King's Kambala).

== Legal status ==
Many have criticised Kambala as cruel to the racing buffaloes, which are driven by whips. Noted animal-rights activist Maneka Gandhi expressed concerns about the ill treatment of buffaloes during the race. While Kambala organizers contend that whips are necessary to elicit maximum speed, government officials advise the riders to be gentle on buffaloes and avoid using whips during the race.

In 2014, based on lawsuits filed by animal welfare organizations, the Supreme Court of India ordered a ban on Kambala. The ban also covered Jallikattu, a sport of hands-on bull taming. A government order lifted the ban on Jallikattu in January 2017, and the public asked for the ban on Kambala to be lifted, too.

The Prevention of Cruelty to Animals (Karnataka Amendment) Ordinance, 2017 re-legalized the Kambala festival in Karnataka. Then-President of India, Pranab Mukherjee, promulgated the new law on 3 July 2017. Litigation continued but was resolved by the passage of the Prevention of Cruelty to Animals (Karnataka Amendment) Bill, 2018, which then-President Ram Nath Kovind approved on 19 February 2018.

However, after the relegalization, it was found that the buffaloes were still being whipped during the race.

== Gallery ==
Buffalo pair entering the track at Mulki

Race in progress

Kambala Race

Mulki Aramane (royal residence associated with the event)

Mulki Aramane

== See also ==
- Pacu jawi, a similar type of race held in Tanah Datar, West Sumatra, Indonesia.
- Sports in Karnataka
- Sport in India
- Hori Habba - Traditional bull-catching event in Karnataka
- Jallikattu - Traditional man-bull fight in Tamil Nadu
- Pola race - Annual bull racing in Maharashtra on Pola festival day
- Flying duck race (pacu itiak) in Payakumbuh, West Sumatra, Indonesia
- Karapan sapi, chariot-style bull racing in Madura, Indonesia
