= Meer Abdul Wahid Bilgrami =

Author and Sufi saint

Hazrat Syed Meer Abdul Wahid Bilgrami

Personal life
- Born: Bilgram Sharif
- Notable work: Haqaiq-e-Hindi

Religious life
- Religion: Islam
- Lineage: Sayyid

Syed Meer Abdul Wahid Bilgrami (1509–1608; also spelt as Mir Abdul Waheed Bilgrami) also known as Shahidi was a Sufi saint of Qadiriyya order and writer of Persian language. He was the author of Haqaiq-e-Hindi, Saba-e-Sanabil, Kalimat-e-Chand, Rush Nama. He was a member of the Sadaat-e-Bilgram and a descendant of Syed Abul Faras bin Syed Abul Farah Wasti al-Zaidi.

== Early life ==
Bilgrami was born to Syed Meer Ibrahim Bilgrami, a disciple of Makhdoom Shah Safi.

== Literary works ==
- Haqaiq-e-Hindi
- Saba-e-Sanabil
- Kalimat-e-Chand
- Deewan Shahidi
- Rush Nama
