= Hori Habba =

Indian rural sport where competitors try to catch items attached to cattle

Hori Habba (ಹೋರಿ ಹಬ್ಬ)
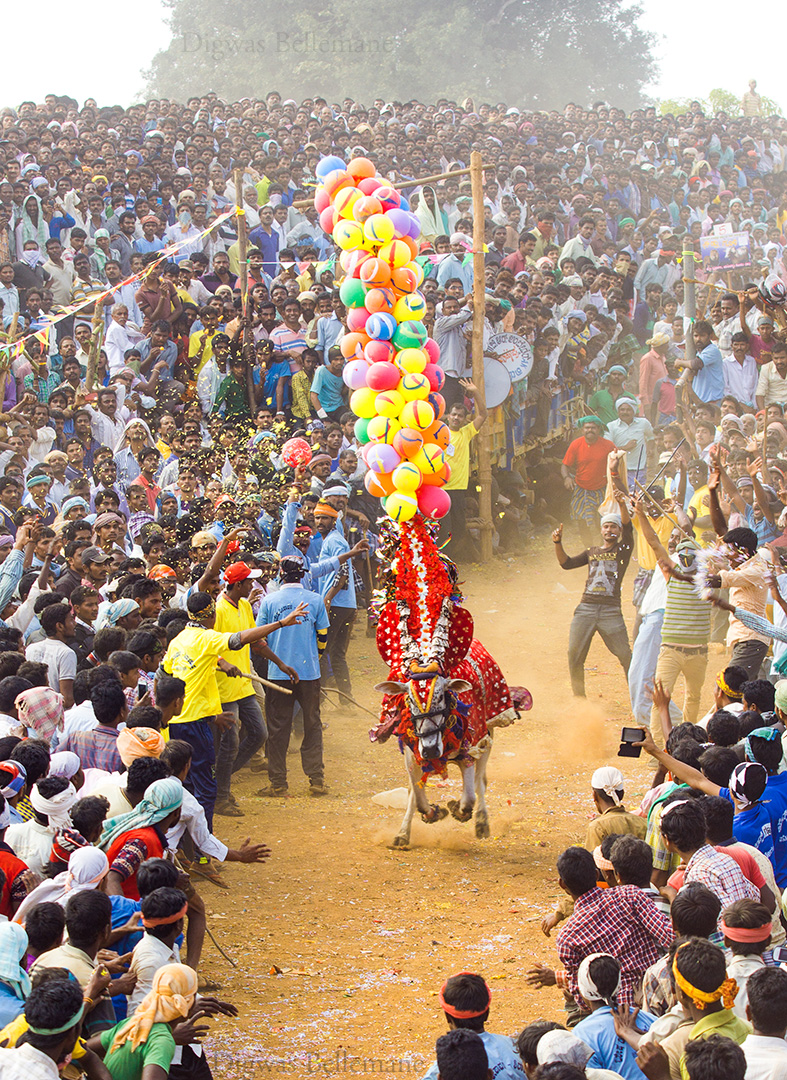
- The Bull "Simhadriya Simha" in action at Hori Habba held at Shiralakoppa in 2016.
- Nicknames: Animals in sport

Characteristics
- Mixed-sex: No
- Type: Traditional sport
- Venue: Open ground

Presence
- Country or region: Karnataka, India
- Olympic: No
- Paralympic: No

Hori Habba, also known as Hatti Habba, Kobbari Hori Competition, is a rural sport in which hundreds of trained and decorated draught cattle and bulls are made to run through huge crowds, Catchers try to subdue the cattle and snatch away prizes such as copra, cash, gift items tied to them. The sport is practiced mainly in Shivamogga, Haveri and Uttara Kannada districts of the Indian state of Karnataka during the Deepavali festival.

Jallikattu is a similar sport practiced in the Indian state of Tamil Nadu.

== Rules ==
Decorated cattle are repeatedly made to run one by one on the predefined track with adequate time interval between any two cattle. For the cattle to win, it shall not loose the copra garland tied around its neck. Cattle with the maximum number of winning runs is awarded. Similarly, catcher who snatches highest copra garlands is awarded.

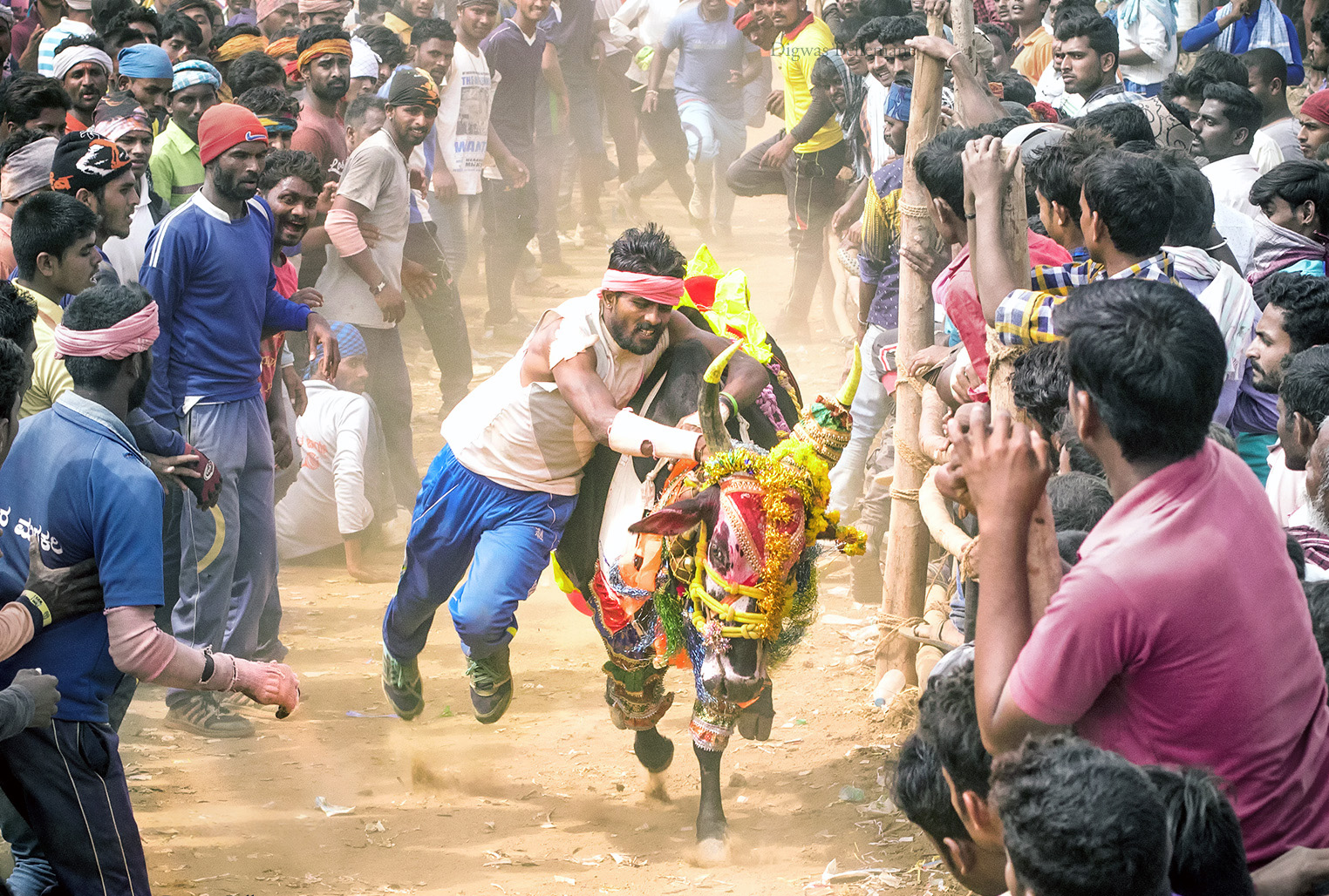
Catcher Byadagi Maantha attempting to snatch copra

== Preparation and Training ==
To begin with, locals form an organising committee. The committee decides on the dates, forms rules and regulations and finalises the awards. Then the information is circulated to the public through handouts, social media (Facebook, WhatsApp) etc. A suitable stretch in and around the village is selected for the run. The stretch is secured on both sides using barricades, tractor trolleys etc. Adequate arrangements are made for the women and kids to sit, watch and cheer the bulls and participants. Adjacent trees, compound walls and terraces too cater as spectator galleries, though many prefers to stand! n Meanwhile, owners of the bulls prepare them well ahead of the season by feeding them with nutritious food. They pamper them, give regular bath to keep them cool. Bulls, no doubt, grow strong and healthy. Owners from nearby areas may even train and familiarise the bulls to the actual track by making it run regularly.

== See also ==
- Jallikattu
- Running of the bulls
- Bull-leaping
