= Saiyid Athar Abbas Rizvi =

Indian Islamic historian (1921–1994)

Saiyid Athar Abbas Rizvi FAHA
- Born: 1921; Jaunpur, Uttar Pradesh, India
- Died: 1994 (aged 72–73)

Academic background
- Education: Aligarh Muslim University; Australian National University

Academic work
- Discipline: History, Sufism, Indian Freedom Movement, Mughal History

Saiyid Athar Abbas Rizvi FAHA (1921–1994) was a modern historian of medieval India, mainly focused on history of Islam in South Asia.

== Education ==
Saiyid Athar Abbas Rizvi obtained his education from Agra University, where he earned his BA (1942), PhD (1949) and D.Litt. (1964).

== Early life ==
Saiyid Athar Abbas Rizvi was born in Jaunpur, Uttar Pradesh, India in 1921 to a family of Shia Muslim Zamindars. He married his wife Nasim Zahra Rizvi, similarly from a Shi'ite family of Zamindars from Tajpur, Ambedkar Nagar District, Uttar Pradesh.

He had 4 children- Parveen, Fazal, Faiz and Abul.

== Academic career ==
He started his career from Aligarh Muslim University. Rizvi was one of the favorite students of Professor Mohammad Habib, and like him, started his academic career by writing on Sufism. He was later appointed as head of the history department, Jammu and Kashmir University, and was also appointed as Secretary of the History of the Freedom Movement by the government of Uttar Pradesh. He worked as a research associate in the School of Oriental and African Studies, University of London between 1962-62 and was fellow in the same institution in the year 1969.

He joined the Department of Asian Civilizations at the Australian National University, Canberra in 1967 at the urging of his University of London colleague Arthur Llewellyn Basham (Professor A. L. Basham), where he worked until 1986.

He was elected a fellow of the Australian Academy of Humanities in 1969. In 1972, he also joined Jawaharlal Nehru University as a visiting faculty.

After retirement Dr. Rizvi continued his research and travel to libraries or giving talks in universities across the world, spending six months of the year as a visiting fellow in what was then ANU's Department of Far Eastern History of the Research School of Pacific Studies, and six months in the field. He died during one such expeditions in the field on 3 September 1994 in Mashhad, Iran.

== Selected works ==
Books Authored

- Fatḥpur-Sīkrī (20 editions published between 1972 and 2002 in English and Hindi).
- A history of Sufism in India in 2 Volumes (14 editions published between 1978 and 2012 in English and Persian).
- Muslim revivalist movements in northern India in the sixteenth and seventeenth centuries (14 editions published between 1965 and 1995 in English).
- Religious and intellectual history of the Muslims in Akbar's reign, with special reference to Abuʼl Fazl, 1556-1605 (8 editions published since 1975 in English).
- The wonder that was India (15 editions published between 1987 and 2005 in English).
- Shāh Walī-Allāh and his times: a study of eighteenth century Islām, politics, and society in India (14 editions published between 1980 and 2004 in English).
- Shah Abd al-Aziz: puritanism, sectarian polemics and Jihad (first published in 1982 in English).
- A socio-intellectual history of the Isnā ʼAsharī Shīʼīs in India (25 editions published since1986 in English and Persian).
- Iran: royalty, religion and revolution (7 editions published since 1980 in English).
- Landmarks of South Asian civilizations: from prehistory to the independence of the subcontinent (4 editions published since 1983 in English).
- Freedom struggle in Uttar Pradesh; source-material by Uttar Pradesh (15 editions published between 1959 and 2011 in English).
