= The Greatness That Was Babylon =

1962 book by H. W. F. Saggs

- Cover of the first edition
- Author: H. W. F. Saggs
- Language: English
- Subjects: Babylonia
- Publisher: Sidgwick & Jackson
- Publication date: 1962
- Publication place: United Kingdom
- Media type: Print (Hardcover and Paperback)
- Pages: 562 (first edition)

The Greatness That Was Babylon (1962; second edition 1988) is a book about Babylonia by the Assyriologist H. W. F. Saggs.

== Summary ==
Saggs, writing for the "general reader", describes the ancient Babylonians before and during the ancient Assyrian Empire. Topics discussed include cuneiform writing.

== Publication history ==
The Greatness That Was Babylon was first published in 1962 by Sidgwick & Jackson. In 1988, the book was reissued in a revised and updated edition. Excavations in Mesopotamia have revealed a large amount of new information relevant to the study of Babylonian civilization, presented here as a revised and rewritten account of the book first published in 1962. The roots of much of western civilization lie in Babylonia the ancient civilization of south Iraq. Alexander the Great recognized the importance of its heritage and planned to make Babylon his world capital. The splendors and supposed wickedness of Babylon lived on in a tradition transmitted through the Bible and classical writers. The author aims here to reconstruct all aspects of this lost culture, presenting the Babylonians as living people - showing their eating and drinking habits, their worship, their relationships and lifestyle and so present an integrated picture.

== Reception ==
The Greatness That Was Babylon received a positive review from the archaeologist Richard David Barnett in The Times Literary Supplement. Barnett commended the book for its "breadth and detail". However, he criticised Saggs's comparisons of the behaviour of the Babylonians with that of the Hebrews as described in the Old Testament. He also believed that Saggs had less mastery of archaeological material than of cuneiform studies.

== See also ==
- The Might That Was Assyria
