= Maramadi =

Cattle race in India

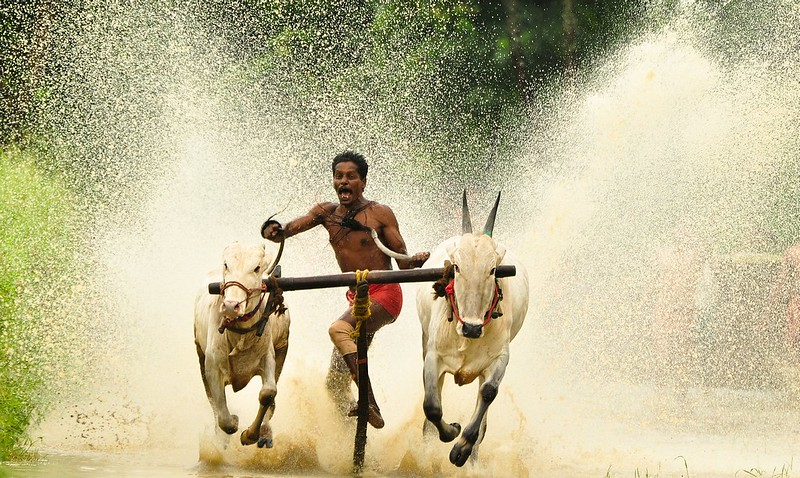
Maramadi dravidian sports

Maramadi is a cattle race conducted in Kerala, India. It is also known as Kalappoottu, or pothottam. The race is a traditional event, usually with bullocks, held after the monsoon but before the cattle are needed for planting.

== Legal status ==
In 2011, the Central Government banned the exhibition and training of bulls, and five other animals, as performing animals under the Prevention of Cruelty to Animals Act, 1960. In 2014, a court ruling held that this ban applied to the Kerala cattle race. In 2015, the Cattle Race Club of India upheld the ruling on appeal to the Kerala High Court.

== Gallery ==
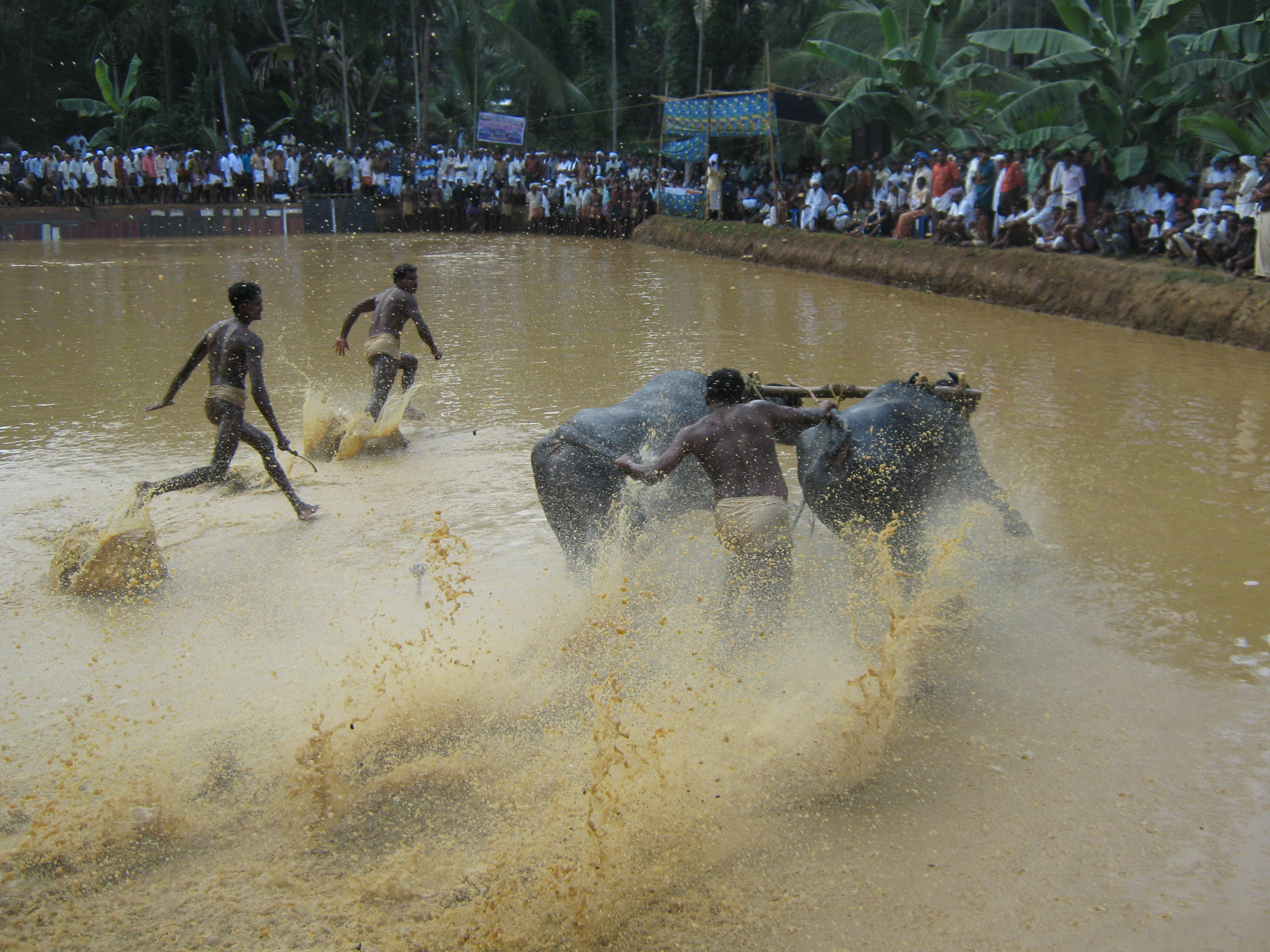
Pothu poottu.

Vellappara

Vellappara

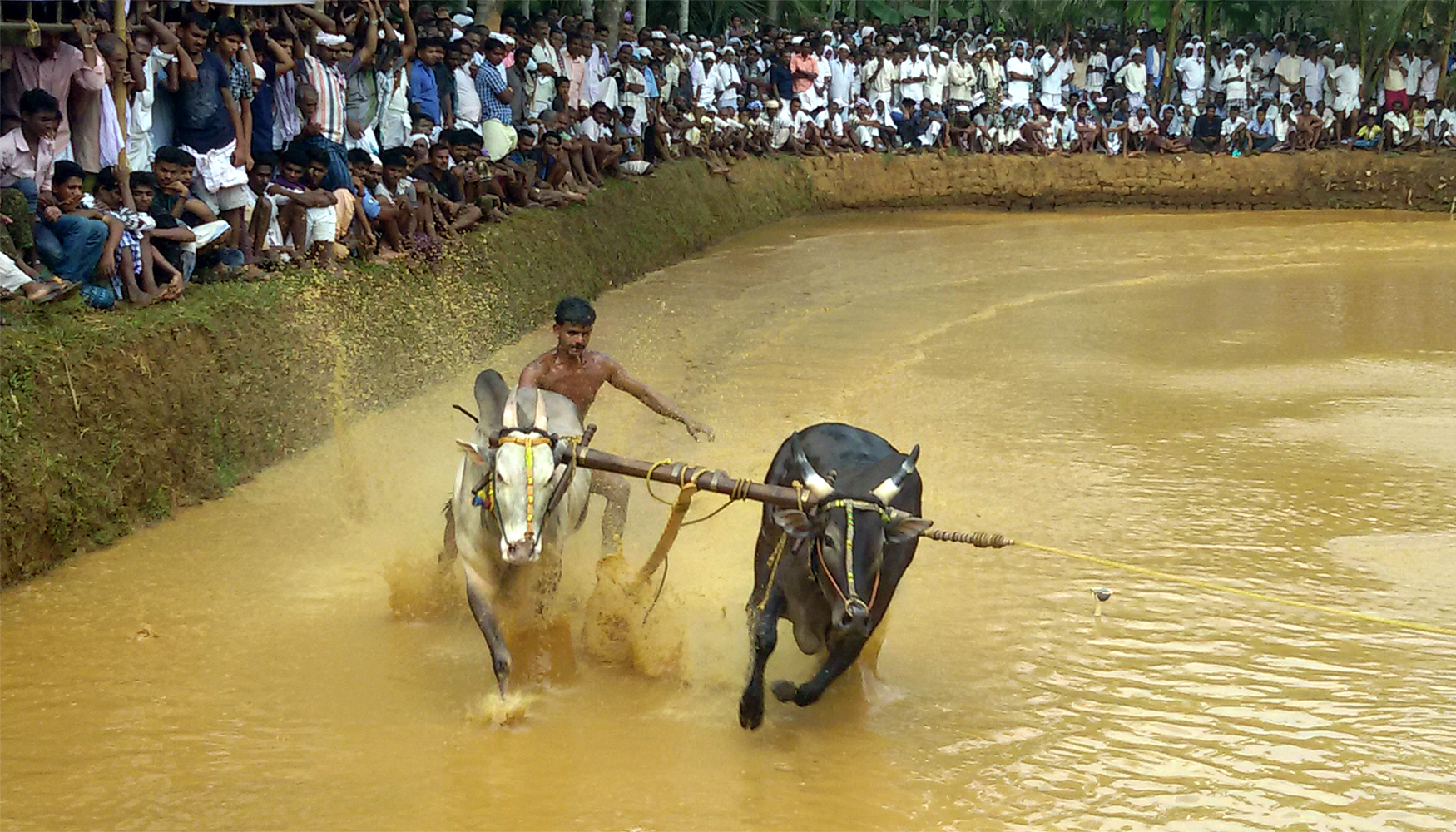
Payyanad

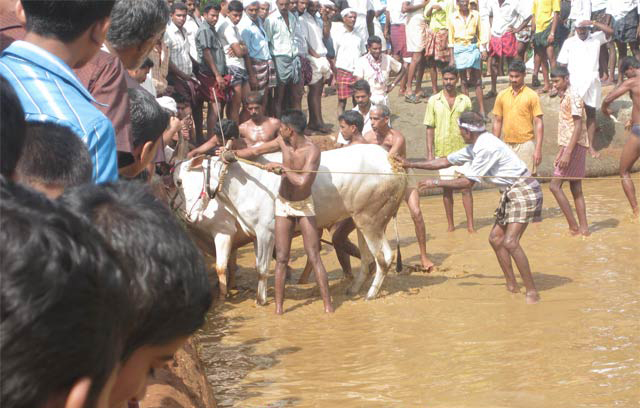
Arimbra, Kondotty

== See also ==
- Kambala
- Malean sampi
