= Arthur Llewellyn Basham =

British historian and Indologist (1914–1986)

Arthur Llewellyn Basham FAHA
- Born: 24 May 1914; Loughton, Essex, England
- Died: 27 January 1986 (aged 71); Calcutta, West Bengal, India
- Education: School of Oriental and African Studies
- Occupations: Historian, Educationalist
- Known for: noted historian and Indologist
- Spouse: Namita Catherine
- Children: 1

Arthur Llewellyn Basham FAHA (24 May 1914 – 27 January 1986) was a British historian, Indologist and author. As a professor at the School of Oriental and African Studies, London in the 1950s and the 1960s, he taught a number of famous historians of India, including professors Nemai Sadhan Bose, Awadh Kishore Narain, Ram Sharan Sharma, Romila Thapar, Bratindra Nath Mukherjee , V. S. Pathak, S.K. Maity and Thomas R. Trautmann and David Lorenzen.

== Early life ==
Arthur Llewellyn Basham was born on 24 May 1914, in Loughton, Essex, the son of Abraham Arthur Edward Basham and Maria Jane Basham née Thompson. Although an only child, he grew up in Essex with his adopted sister, who was in fact his cousin on his father's side. His father had been a journalist who served in the Indian Army at Kasauli, near Simla during World War I, and it was the stories that his father told him about India that first introduced him to the culture of the country to which he would devote his professional career. His mother was also a journalist and short story writer further instilling a love of language and literature. As a child, he was also introduced to music and learnt to play the piano to a high standard, writing a number of his own compositions by the age of sixteen.

Basham developed a keen interest in religion which began with the Christianity he was brought up with and then extended into Hinduism, Buddhism and Islam. He went on to take a BA in Sanskrit from the School of Oriental and African Studies ("SOAS") and then worked in the Civil Defence Department during World War II.

== Career ==
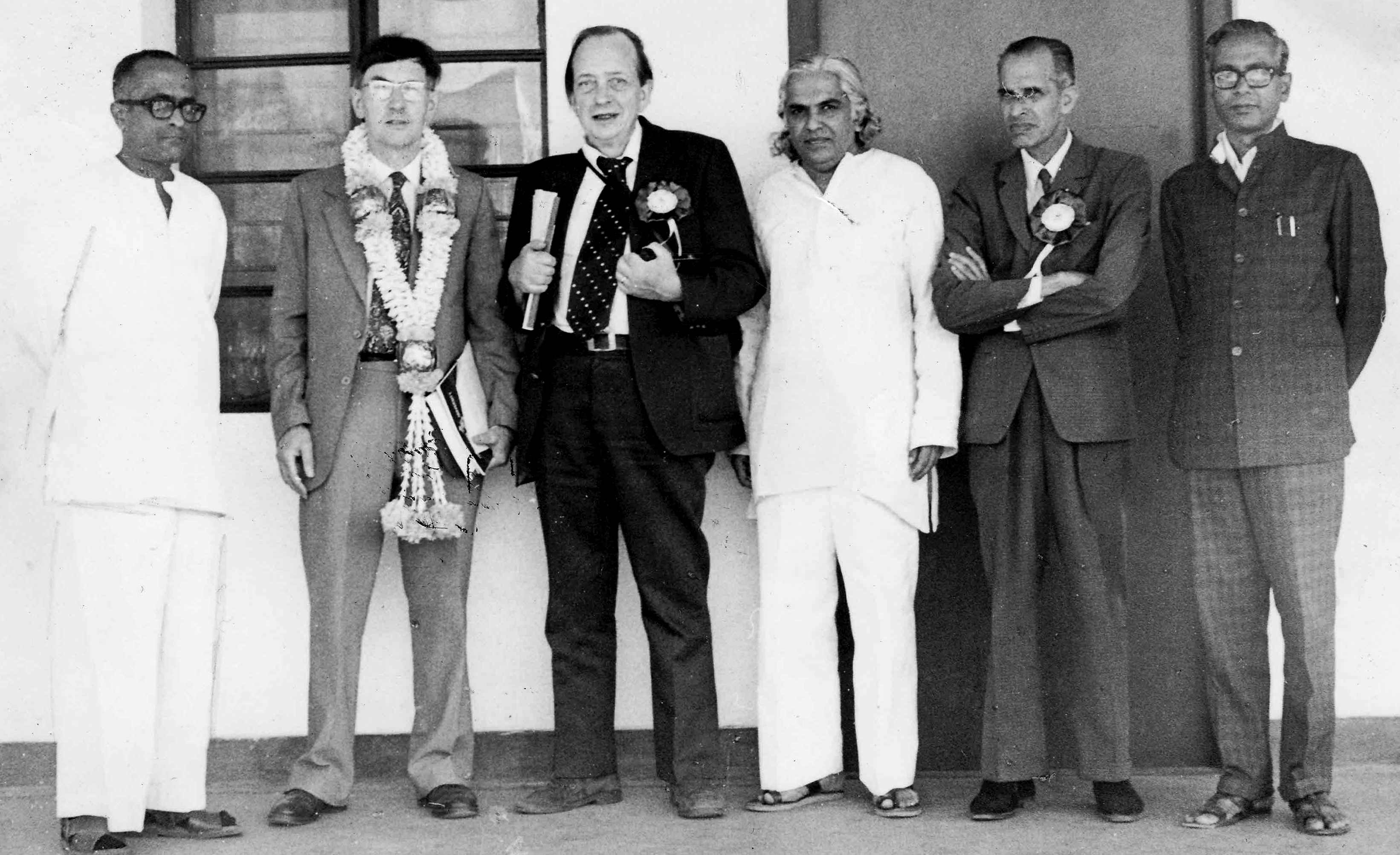
Group Photograph showing T. V. Venkatachala Sastry (first from right) and H. M. Nayak (third from right) with A. L. Basham (third from left) during a meet at University of Mysore.

After the war he returned to SOAS and began researching for a PhD under Professor L.D. Barnett. For his research into the "History and Doctrines of the Ajivikas" he received a scholarship. He became a lecturer in 1948, attained the PhD in 1950, became a Reader in 1954, and in 1958 was promoted to Professorship. When the Head of the Department of History, Professor C. H. Philips, was promoted to the Directorship of SOAS, Professor Basham became the Head of History, a position he kept until 1965 when he joined the Australian National University ("ANU") in Canberra as Head of the History Department and Professor of Oriental (later Asian) Civilizations. He was a Foundation Fellow of the Australian Academy of the Humanities in 1969.

A reminiscence contributed by an unidentified URL in 2014 states :As an undergrad at ANU in the 1970s I well remember attending his Asian Civilizations lectures in the HC Coombs lecture theatre. One morning in 1974 we noticed that an upright piano had been left from a performance the previous evening. Upon arrival for his lecture, Prof Basham calmly strolled over to the piano, sat down and played the most beautiful Chopin for five minutes or so. A standing ovation from his students followed. I can still see him striding across the campus, pipe-in-mouth, forty years later.

After retiring from ANU in 1979, Basham accepted a series of one year visiting professorships with various universities. Basham was one of the first western historians to critically gauge the impact of Swami Vivekananda from a global perspective. His well-known comment about Vivekananda that "in centuries to come, he will be remembered as one of the main moulders of the modern world," is quoted frequently in appreciations and tributes of Vivekananda. Basham was appointed Swami Vivekananda Professor in Oriental Studies at the Asiatic Society of Calcutta in September 1985. He died in Calcutta in India in 1986. An annual public lecture series is given at the ANU in his memory.

== Books ==
Possibly his most popular book is The Wonder That was India (Sidgwick & Jackson, London, 1954) – published seven years after the 1947 Independence of India. Revised editions of the book were released in 1963 and then 1967. Rupa & Co, New Delhi brought out a paperback edition in 1981. Macmillan Publishers Ltd., London, brought out a paperback edition in 1985. By 2001, the paperback version was in its 37th edition. Amazon.com staff review/book description reads "most widely used introduction to Indian civilization. Although first published in 1954, it has remained a classic interpretation." In the book he states that "man can escape from 'Law of Gravity' as well as 'passage of Time' but not from his deeds".

Basham also wrote History and Doctrines of the Ajivikas: A Vanished Indian Religion, which was based on his dissertation advised by L. D. Barnett.

== Works by others ==
Several of his key papers on Hinduism were edited as the book The Origins and Development of Classical Hinduism by Kenneth G. Zysk.

A book about Basham, written by Sachindra Kumar Maity (published 1997, Abhinav Publications, ISBN 81-7017-326-4) is entitled Professor A.L. Basham, My Guruji and Problems and Perspectives of Ancient Indian History and Culture. The book includes 80 of Basham's letters addressed to the author. Thomas R. Trautmann, a professor for history and anthropology at the University of Michigan, dedicated his book Aryans and British India (1997, University of California Press) 'In memory of A. L. Basham, British Sanskritist historian of India, guru, friend'.

== Bibliography ==
Books

- The History and Doctrines of the Ajivikas: a Vanished Indian Religion, London, 1951, ISBN 9788120812048
- The Wonder that was India, London, 1954, ISBN 9780330439091
- Papers on the Date of Kaniṣka, Leiden, 1968, ISBN 9789004001510
- A Cultural History of India (editor), Oxford, 1975, ISBN 978-0195639216

He also revised Vincent Arthur Smith's Oxford History of India with Mortimer Wheeler in 1958.

Papers

- Basham, A. L. (October 1948). "Harṣa of Kashmir and the Iconoclast Ascetics". Bulletin of the School of Oriental and African Studies. 12 (3–4): 140–145. doi:10.1017/S0041977X00083269.
- Basham, A. L. (February 1949). "Recent Work on the Indus Civilization". Bulletin of the School of Oriental and African Studies. 13 (1): 140–145. doi:10.1017/S0041977X00081891.
- Basham, A.L. (1953). "A New Study of the Śaka-Kuṣāṇa Period". Bulletin of the School of Oriental and African Studies. 15 (1): 80–97. doi:10.1017/s0041977x00087279. JSTOR 608886.
- Basham, A.L. (February 1957). "The Succession of the Line of Kaniṣka". Bulletin of the School of Oriental and African Studies. 20: 77–88. doi:10.1017/S0041977X00061693.
- Basham, A. L. (1981) "The Evolution of the Concept of Bodhisattva" in The Bodhisattva Doctrine in Buddhism, Edited by Kawamura, Leslie S., Waterloo, Ont: Published for the Canadian Corporation for Studies in Religion/Corporation canadienne des sciences religieuses by Wilfrid Laurier University Press, 1981. ("Papers presented at the Calgary Buddhism conference, Sept. 18–21, 1978, sponsored by the Religious Studies Dept., Faculty of Humanities, University of Calgary"), ISBN 9780919812123, OCLC 781433516
